= Trash Box =

Compilation album
- Released: 2004
- Recorded: Mid-1960s
- Genre: Garage rock, psychedelic rock
- Label: HIT

Trash Box is a 5-CD box set of mid-1960s garage rock and psychedelic rock recordings, primarily by American bands. This box set is similar to the earlier Pebbles Box (a 5-LP box set) and includes almost all of the same recordings in that box set (and in the same order), along with numerous bonus tracks at the end of each disc. Supposedly, the Trash Box collects the first five volumes of the CDs in the Pebbles series (i.e., those released by AIP Records, not to be confused with the 4 earlier CDs that were issued by ESD Records). However, as is generally true of the CD reissues of these five volumes (though not nearly to the same extent), the tracks differ significantly on all five discs as compared to both the original Pebbles LPs and the later Pebbles CDs in the corresponding volumes; and the surf rock rarities on Pebbles, Volume 4 have been eschewed entirely. Overall, there are 109 tracks in the box set (excluding the introduction and ending cuts) as compared to 101 songs on the individual CDs and 72 tracks in the Pebbles Box.

Although most of the recordings on Trash Box were released at some point on one of the individual Pebbles albums, several of the songs have not appeared elsewhere in the Pebbles series. Inexplicably, one of these songs is the well-known hit "I Fought the Law" by the Bobby Fuller Four (on Disc Four) – which is also included in the Pebbles Box – in place of the much rarer "Wine Wine Wine" by Bobby Fuller that appears on Pebbles, Volume 2. The song "Be Forewarned" on Disc Three was actually recorded in 1972; Macabre is a predecessor band to the early doom metal band, Pentagram. Likewise, the untitled, hidden track at the end of Disc Four, "We're Pretty Sick" by trash rock/garage punk band the Cannibals is a more recent song, dating from 1991. Bandleader Mike Spenser of the Cannibals operates the HIT Records label that released the Trash Box.

== Release data ==
This box set was released (reportedly in 2004) in the United Kingdom on the HIT Records label with a similar catalogue number as the Pebbles Box, #CDBOXX1. Like AIP Records – which released the later albums in the Pebbles series – Ubik Records is one of the record labels that was started by Bomp! Records.

== Similarities and differences with the Pebbles Box ==
Nearly all of the tracks in the Pebbles Box are included on the corresponding disc in the Trash Box, with the bonus selections at the end of each disc. However, there are a few exceptions. On Disc Two, the second recording by the Inmates is "Fakirs and Thieves" rather than "I Can Make it Without You"; both songs are not otherwise available on Pebbles albums. The recordings by GONN and the Dearly Beloved are in reverse order on Disc Three in the Trash Box, as is also true of the songs by the Bethlehem Exit and Edgin Inds on Disc Four. Finally, the song on Disc Five of the Trash Box by the Bitter End is "Find Someone to Love" instead of "If You Want Somebody".

== Differences with the original Pebbles LPs ==
While the Trash Box is supposed to collect the first five albums in the Pebbles series, the recordings in this box set are actually much different from both the original LPs and the original CDs. Specifically, as to the first Pebbles LP, 4 of the 8 tracks on Side 1 and 6 of the 8 tracks on Side 2 of the original LP are included on Disc One in the Trash Box and in the same order (plus "Rich with Nothin'" is on Disc Two). Some of the omissions are true garage rock classics, like "Spazz" and "I'm in Pittsburgh (and it's Raining)"; the other omitted songs are "Going All the Way" (which is also not included on the CD version of the original Pebbles album), "You Treat Me Bad", and the Canadian monster "1-2-5" (although there is another song by the Haunted on Disc Four).

The situation is similar on the Pebbles, Volume 2 LP, where just 4 songs from Side 1 and 3 songs from Side 2 are on Disc Two of this set, with "Green Fuz" moved to the other side of Disc Two and the Electric Prunes radio commercial to Disc Three. The lamented deletions include legendary bands like Zakary Thaks and the Moving Sidewalks (where Billy Gibbons of ZZ Top started out), plus the remarkable track called "Makin' Deals" by the Satans that opened that LP, which has the same general theme and even some of the same lyrics as the later Stones classic, "Sympathy for the Devil". Songs by the Litter and The Squires and both cuts by the Dovers are also left off the Trash Box, along with the bratty "So What!" and (as already noted) "Wine Wine Wine".

Disc Three includes 11 of the songs on the psychedelic grab-bag that is the Pebbles, Volume 3 LP; additionally (as noted below), two of the standout cuts on the album, "I'm Five Years Ahead of My Time" and "Voices Green and Purple" are among the bonus tracks on the Trash Box that are not on the Pebbles Box. There are also several other omissions: "I'm Allergic to Flowers", "Soggy Cereal", "Dom Kellar os Mods", "Like a Dribbling Fram" and the bonus track.

As noted, all of the tracks on Pebbles, Volume 4 have been omitted from the Trash Box. Although many songs appear on other Pebbles albums, none of the recordings on Disc Four appear on the first five LPs in the Pebbles series.

Finally, fully half of the recordings on Pebbles, Volume 5 are not included on Disc Five of the Trash Box: "Go Away", "You Don't Know Me", "Why", "Universal Vagrant", "I Tell No Lies", "You Need Love", "The Way it Used to Be", "I Need Love", and "The Way I Feel".

== Differences with the original Pebbles CDs ==
When AIP Records reissued the first five volumes in the Pebbles series on CD, a few tracks were omitted. While most of these tracks are also among those that are omitted from both the Pebbles Box and the Trash Box, there is a single exception: "Cracking Up" by the Wig was inadvertently left off the CD reissue of Pebbles, Volume 1 – although it is listed on the printed material for the CD – and is included on both of these box sets (on Disc One). Additionally, the two best omitted tracks from the Pebbles, Volume 3 LP are on the Trash Box but not on the Pebbles Box: "I'm Five Years Ahead of My Time" by the Third Bardo is a bonus track on Disc One, and "Voices Green and Purple" by the Bees is a bonus track on Disc Two.

For the most part, however, this section concentrates on the bonus tracks on the CDs as compared to the Trash Box. There are many more bonus tracks on the Trash Box than on the Pebbles CDs: Other than Pebbles, Volume 4 (which is completely omitted from both box sets), there are 19 bonus tracks on the individual Pebbles CDs that are not on the individual Pebbles LPs, as compared to 37 bonus tracks on the Trash Box that are not on the Pebbles Box. Although less than one-half of these 19 tracks are included on the Trash Box, most of those are also on the Pebbles Box. Regarding Pebbles, Volume 1, "Ain't No Friend of Mine" by the Sparkles is a bonus track on Disc Two; while the classic "Blackout of Gretely" by GONN is not included, the band's "Doin' Me In" is on Disc Four of both box sets. Among the bonus tracks on the Pebbles, Volume 2 CD, the second song by the Choir is a bonus track on Disc Four of the Trash Box; "She'll Lie" by Satan & D-Men is on Disc Four of both box sets; and "Crazy Things" by the Quid is on Disc Three of both box sets. Only one of the six bonus tracks on the Pebbles, Volume 3 CD is included in the Trash Box; "Rattle of Life" by Oshun is on Disc Three on both box sets. Finally, one of the Pebbles, Volume 5 CD bonus tracks, "Stop and Listen" by The Shag is on Disc One of both the Pebbles Box and the Trash Box.

== Track listing ==
=== Disc one ===
1. Mike Spenser - "Introduction" (0:48)
2. The Litter – "Action Woman" (2:33)
3. The Preachers – "Who Do You Love?" (2:18)
4. Floyd Dakil Combo – "Dance Franny Dance" (2:08)
5. The Shag – "Stop and Listen" (2:35)
6. The Grains of Sand – "Going Away Baby" (2:11)
7. The Rogues – "The Train Kept A-Rollin'" (2:36)
8. The Sweet Acids – "That Creature" (3:00)
9. The Soup Greens – "Like a Rolling Stone" (2:46)
10. The Wig – "Cracking Up" (2:10)
11. Positively 13 O'Clock – "Psychotic Reaction" (2:02)
12. Kim Fowley – "The Trip" (2:02)
13. Kim Fowley – "Underground Lady" (2:16)
14. The Shadows of Knight – "The Potato Chip Song" (3:30)
15. The Wilde Knights – "Beaver Patrol" (2:21)
16. The Stoics – "Hate" (2:25)
17. The Grodes – "Let's Talk About Girls" (2:40)
18. The Rogues – "Wanted Dead or Alive" (2:29)
19. The Third Bardo – "I'm Five Years Ahead of My Time" (2:13)
20. The Fallen Angels – "Bad Woman" (2:10)
21. The Turfits – "If It's Love You Want" (2:07)
22. Ground Floor People – "Walking on Eggs" (2:17)

=== Disc two ===
1. The Split Ends – "Rich with Nothin'" (2:22)
2. The Sons of Adam – "Feathered Fish" (2:32)
3. The Road – "You Rub Me the Wrong Way" (2:31)
4. The Buddahs – "Lost Innocence" (2:11)
5. The Regiment – "My Soap Won't Float" (2:17)
6. The Inmates – "More Than I Have" (2:33)
7. The Inmates – "Fakirs and Thieves" (2:00)
8. The Little Boy Blues – "I Can Only Give You Everything" (2:34)
9. Phil & the Frantics – "I Must Run" (2:42)
10. The Choir – "It's Cold Outside" (2:51)
11. The Journeymen – "She's Sorry" (2:06)
12. The Wee Four – "Weird" (2:04)
13. William Penn Fyve – "Blow My Mind" (2:12)
14. Randy Alvey & Green Fuz – "Green Fuz" (2:02)
15. The Bees – "Voices Green and Purple" (1:35)
16. Nobody's Children – "Good Times" (2:43)
17. The Sparkles – "Ain't No Friend of Mine" (2:23)
18. The Barbarians – "Hey Little Bird" (2:20)
19. The Spades – "You're Gonna Miss Me" (3:16)
20. The Ground Floor – "It's Alright Now" (2:33)
21. The Brogues – "I Ain't No Miracle Worker" (2:40)

=== Disc three ===
1. Dave Diamond & the Higher Elevation – "The Diamond Mine" (2:15)
2. Teddy & His Patches – "Suzy Creamcheese" (3:10)
3. The Crystal Chandelier – "Suicidal Flowers" (2:24)
4. Naked Truth – "The Wall" (2:31)
5. The Electric Prunes – "Vox Wah Wah Ad" (1:02)
6. The Calico Wall – "Flight Reaction" (2:39)
7. The Hogs – "Loose Lips Sync Ship" (3:05)
8. Macabre – "Be Forewarned" (3:28)
9. The Monocles – "The Spider and the Fly" (2:07)
10. Godfrey – "Let's Take a Trip" (Kim Fowley) (2:15)
11. T.C. Atlantic – "Faces" (2:47)
12. Oshun – "Rattle of Life" (2:16)
13. The Weird Street Carnival – "The Inner Truth" (2:08)
14. The Driving Stupid – "The Reality of (Air) Fried Borsk" (1:51)
15. The Driving Stupid – "Horror Asparagus Stories" (2:36)
16. M.G. & the Escorts – "A Someday Fool" (2:34)
17. The Quests – "Shadows in the Night" (2:34)
18. Pat Farrell & the Believers – "Bad Woman" (2:08)
19. The Electric Company – "Scarey Business" (2:53)
20. The Cavemen – "It's Trash" (2:07)
21. The Teddy Boys – "Mona" (3:00)
22. Calico Wall – "I'm a Living Sickness" (2:36)

=== Disc four ===
1. Dearly Beloved – "Flight 13" (1:49)
2. GONN – "Doin' Me In" (2:48)
3. The Quid – "Crazy Things" (3:01)
4. Satan & the D-Men – "She'll Lie" (3:08)
5. The Haunted – "Vapeur Mauve" (3:36)
6. Phil & the Frantics – "Till You Get What You Want" (2:43)
7. The Grodes – "Cry a Little Longer" (2:04)
8. The Bobby Fuller Four – "I Fought the Law" (2:15)
9. The Groupies – "I'm a Hog for You" (2:53)
10. The Debonaires – "Never Mistaken" (2:30)
11. The Oxford Circle – "Foolish Woman" (2:35)
12. Edgin Inds – "Don't Try to Hide It" (2:28)
13. The Bethlehem Exit – "Blues Concerning My Girl" (2:07)
14. The Spades – "We Sell Soul" (3:17)
15. The Final Solution – "So Long Goodbye" (6:11)
16. The Orange Wedge – "From the Womb to the Tomb" (2:50)
17. The Choir – "I'm Going Home" (2:35)
18. The Mile Ends – "Bottle Up and Go" (2:14)
19. Kit and the Outlaws – "Don't Tread on Me" (2:50)
20. Michael Omansky – "Searching" (2:29)
21. The Id – "The Rake" (2:03)
22. J.D. Blackfoot – "Epitaph for a Head" (2:24)
23. Untitled Hidden Track by The Cannibals – "We're Pretty Sick" (2:18)

=== Disc Five ===
1. The Tree – "No Good Woman" (2:39)
2. The Gentlemen – "It's a Cry'n Shame" (2:33)
3. The Five Canadians – "Writing on the Wall" (2:19)
4. Satori – "Time Machine" (1:39)
5. The Leather Boy – "Shadows" (2:12)
6. William Penn Fyve – "Swami" (2:57)
7. The Fe-Fi-Four Plus 2 – "I Wanna Come Back (from the World of LSD)" (2:19)
8. The Bitter End – "Find Somebody to Love" (3:13)
9. Satyrs – "Yesterday's Hero" (2:36)
10. The State of Mind – "Move" (2:11)
11. Yesterday's Children – "Wanna Be with You" (2:33)
12. Thursday's Children – "You'll Never Be My Girl" (2:10)
13. Thursday's Children – "Air Conditioned Man" (2:14)
14. The Tropics – "I Want More" (2:31)
15. Black and Blues – "Come to Me" (2:46)
16. The Gants – "Smoke Rings" (2:38)
17. Billy McKnight – "You're Doin' Me Wrong" (2:07)
18. The Glass Sun – "Silence of the Morning" (5:09)
19. The Plastic Blues Band – "Gone" (2:11)
20. The Palace Guards – "No Comin' Back" (2:22)
21. The Turfits – "Losin' One" (2:27)
22. The Jury – "Who Dat?" (2:20)
23. Mike Spenser - "Goodbye, So Long!!!!" (0:09)
