= Pebbles Box =

Compilation album
- Released: 1987
- Recorded: Mid-1960s
- Genre: Garage rock, psychedelic rock
- Label: Hit Records/Ubik Records

The Pebbles Box is a 5-LP box set of mid-1960s garage rock and psychedelic rock recordings, primarily by American bands. Several years later, a similar 5-CD box set was released that was called the Trash Box. The Pebbles Box purports to collect the first five volumes of the Pebbles series, although there are fewer songs than on the original LPs: 72 total tracks on the five discs, as compared with 86 on the original LPs. Also, as is generally true of the CD reissues of these five volumes (though not nearly to the same extent), the tracks differ significantly on all five discs as compared to both the original Pebbles LPs and the later Pebbles CDs in the corresponding volumes; and the surf rock rarities on Pebbles, Volume 4 have been eschewed entirely.

Although most of the recordings on the Pebbles Box were released at some point on one of the individual Pebbles albums, several of the songs have not appeared elsewhere in the Pebbles series. Inexplicably, one of these songs is the well-known hit "I Fought the Law (but the Law Won)" by the Bobby Fuller Four (on Disc Four) – which is also included in the Trash Box – in place of the much rarer "Wine Wine Wine" by Bobby Fuller that appears on Pebbles, Volume 2. The song "Be Forewarned" on Disc Three was actually recorded in 1972; Macabre is a predecessor band to the early doom metal band, Pentagram.

== Release data ==
The Pebbles Box was released in the United Kingdom in 1987 by Ubik Records, with a catalogue number of BOXX1. Like AIP Records – which released the later albums in the Pebbles series – Ubik Records is one of the record labels that was started by Bomp! Records.

== Differences with the Trash Box ==
Nearly all of the tracks in the Pebbles Box are included in the Trash Box, with only two exceptions: On Disc Two of the Trash Box, the second recording by The Inmates is "Fakirs and Thieves" rather than "I Can Make it without You"; and on Disc Five, the song by the Bitter End is "Find Someone to Love" instead of "If You Want Somebody".

== Differences with the original Pebbles LPs ==
While the Pebbles Box is supposed to collect the first five albums in the Pebbles series, the recordings in this box set are actually much different from the original LPs. Specifically, as to the first Pebbles album, 4 of the 8 tracks on Side 1 and 6 of the 8 tracks on Side 2 of the original LP are included on Disc One in the Pebbles Box and in the same order (plus "Rich with Nothin'" is on Disc Two). Some of the omissions are true garage rock classics, like "Spazz" and "I'm in Pittsburgh (and it's Raining)"; the other omitted songs are "Going All the Way" (which is also not included on the CD version of the original Pebbles album), the Canadian monster "1-2-5" (although there is another song by the Haunted on Disc Four), and "You Treat Me Bad". Disc One includes a different rendering of "Train Kept A-Rollin'" from the one that appears on the Pebbles, Volume 11 LP, along with a second Kim Fowley song, "Underground Lady" that is not otherwise available among the various Pebbles records. The other songs on Disc One – "Stop & Listen" and "That Creature" – are beloved garage rock recordings that appear in later volumes in the Pebbles series.

The situation is similar on Pebbles, Volume 2, where just 4 songs from Side 1 and 3 songs from Side 2 are on Disc Two of this set, with "Green Fuz" moved to the other side of Disc Two and the Electric Prunes radio commercial to Disc Three. The lamented deletions include legendary bands like Zakary Thaks and the Moving Sidewalks (where Billy Gibbons of ZZ Top started out), plus the remarkable track called "Makin' Deals" by the Satans that opened that LP, which has the same general theme and even some of the same lyrics as the later Stones classic, "Sympathy for the Devil". Songs by the Litter and The Squires and both cuts by the Dovers are also left off the Pebbles Box, along with the bratty "So What!" and (as already noted) "Wine Wine Wine". However, welcome additions include "My Soap Won't Float", "Weird" and two songs by The Inmates; one of these, "More than I Have" is among the real treats on the last few Pebbles LPs, while "I Can Make it without You" is not represented elsewhere on the Pebbles albums. This is also true of "She's Sorry" and a second song by William Penn Fyve, whose "Swami" is on Pebbles, Volume 3 and Disc Five of the Pebbles Box.

Disc Three includes 11 of the songs on the psychedelic grab-bag that is Pebbles, Volume 3, although the omissions include two of the standout cuts on the album, "I'm Five Years Ahead of My Time" and "Voices Green and Purple", plus several others that are not so greatly missed: "I'm Allergic to Flowers", "Soggy Cereal", "Dom Kellar os Mods", "Like a Dribbling Fram" and the bonus track. Only one of the additional songs appears elsewhere in the Pebbles series; "The Inner Truth" is on Pebbles, Volume 22, while "The Wall" and "Be Forewarned" are new to Pebbles. "Horror Asparagus Stories" by The Driving Stupid, listed on the cover and label of the original BFD LP but somehow omitted, appears in this volume.

As noted, all of the tracks on Pebbles, Volume 4 have been omitted from the Pebbles Box. Although many songs appear on other Pebbles albums, none of the recordings on Disc Four appear on the first five LPs in the Pebbles series.

Finally, fully half of the recordings on Pebbles, Volume 5 are not included on Disc Five of the Pebbles Box: "Go Away", "You Don't Know Me", "Why", "Universal Vagrant", "I Tell No Lies", "You Need Love", "The Way it Used to Be", "I Need Love", and "The Way I Feel". Of the tracks on Disc Five that are not on the corresponding LP, the most gratifying is "Shadows", probably the best of the three songs by Milan (also known as the Leather Boy) on the Pebbles, Volume 11 LP and the only one that has not yet been otherwise released on the Pebbles CDs. There are four additional songs on Disc Five that are new to Pebbles: a second song by Thursday's Children, "Time Machine", "If You Want Somebody", and "I Want More".

== Track listing ==
=== Disc one ===
Side 1

1. The Litter: "Action Woman" — rel. 1967
2. The Preachers: "Who Do You Love?" (Ellas McDaniel) — rel. 1965
3. The Floyd Dakil Combo: "Dance Franny Dance" — rel. 1964
4. The Shag: "Stop & Listen"
5. The Grains of Sand: "Going Away Baby" — rel. 1966
6. The Rogues: "Train Kept A Rollin'"
7. The Sweet Acids: "That Creature"

Side 2

1. The Soup Greens: "Like a Rolling Stone" (Bob Dylan) — rel. 1965
2. The Wig: "Crackin' Up" (Rusty Wier) – rel. 1966
3. Positively 13 O'Clock: "Psychotic Reaction" — rel. 1966
4. Kim Fowley: "The Trip" (Kim Fowley) — rel. 1965
5. Kim Fowley: "Underground Lady"
6. The Shadows of Knight: "Potato Chip" — rel. 1967
7. The Wilde Knights: "Beaver Patrol" — rel. 1965

=== Disc two ===
Side 3

1. The Split Ends: "Rich With Nothin'"
2. The Sons of Adam: "Feathered Fish"
3. The Road: "You Rub Me The Wrong Way"
4. The Buddhas: "Lost Innocence"
5. The Regiment: "My Soap Won't Float" (R. Simpson) – rel. 1967
6. The Inmates: "More Than I Have"
7. The Inmates: "I Can Make It Without You"

Side 4

1. The Little Boy Blues: "I Can Only Give You Everything"
2. Phil and the Frantics: "I Must Run"
3. The Choir: "It's Cold Outside"
4. The Journey Men: "She's Sorry"
5. The Wee Four: "Weird"
6. William Penn Fyve: "Blow My Mind"
7. Randy Alvey and Green Fuz: "Green Fuz"

=== Disc three ===
Side 5

1. Dave Diamond & The Higher Elevation: "The Diamond Mine"
2. Teddy and His Patches: "Suzy Creamcheese"
3. The Crystal Chandelier: "Suicidal Flowers"
4. Naked Truth: "The Wall"
5. The Electric Prunes: "Vox Wah Wah Commercial"
6. The Calico Wall: "Flight Reaction"
7. The Hogs: "Loose Lip Sync Ship"

Side 6

1. Macabre: "Be Forewarned"
2. Monocles: "The Spider & The Fly"
3. Godfrey: "Let's Take A Trip" (Kim Fowley)
4. T.C. Atlantic: "Faces"
5. Oshun: "Rattle Of Life"
6. The Weird Street Carnival: "The Inner Truth"
7. The Driving Stupid: "The Reality of (Air) Fried Borsk"
8. The Driving Stupid: "Horror Asparagus Stories"

=== Disc four ===
Side 7

1. GONN: "Doin' Me In"
2. The Dearly Beloved: "Flight Thirteen"
3. The Quid: "Crazy Things"
4. Satan & The D-Men: "She'll Lie"
5. The Haunted: "Vapeur Mauve"
6. Phil & The Frantics: "Till You Get What You Want"
7. The Grodes: "Cry A Little Longer"
8. The Bobby Fuller Four: "I Fought the Law"

Side 8

1. The Groupies: "Hog (I'm A Hog For You Baby)"
2. The Debonaires: "Never Mistaken"
3. Oxford Circle: "Foolish Woman"
4. The Bethlehem Exit: "Blues Concerning My Girl"
5. Edgin Inds: "Don't Try To Hide It"
6. The Spades: "We Sell Soul"
7. The Final Solution: "So Long Goodbye"

=== Disc five ===
Side 9

1. The Tree: "No Good Woman"
2. The Gentlemen: "It's a Cry'n Shame"
3. The Five Canadians: "Writing On The Wall"
4. Satori: "Time Machine"
5. The Leather Boy: "Shadows"
6. William Penn Fyve: "Swami"
7. The Fe-Fi-Four Plus 2: "I Wanna Come Back (From The World Of LSD)"

Side 10

1. The Bitter End: "If You Want Somebody"
2. Satyrs: "Yesterday's Hero"
3. The State Of Mind: "Move"
4. Yesterday's Children: "Wanna Be With You"
5. Thursday's Children: "You'll Never Be My Girl"
6. Thursday's Children: "Air Conditioned Man"
7. The Tropics: "I Want More"
