= Essential Pebbles, Volume 1 =

Compilation album
- Released: 1997
- Recorded: Mid-1960s
- Genre: Garage rock, psychedelic rock
- Label: AIP

chronology
Essential Pebbles, Volume 1 (1997)	Essential Pebbles, Volume 2 (1998)

Essential Pebbles, Volume 1 is the first compilation album in the Essential Pebbles series. Although subtitled Ultimate '66 garage classics!, not all of the recordings on the album were originally released in 1966.

== Release data ==
This album was released on AIP Records in 1997 as #AIP-CD-1058. The first CD collects tracks from the first 10 CDs in the Pebbles series plus Ear-Piercing Punk, while the second CD are "insanely rare bonus tracks" that are previously un-reissued in any form.

== Notes on the tracks ==
As mentioned in the introductory liner notes, the recordings on the first CD serve as "a sort of 'greatest hits' for seasoned listeners" as well as an introduction to the Pebbles series, with the inclusion of well-known garage and psychedelic classics such "Green Fuz", "I Never Loved Her", "She's Not Just Anybody", and "Doin' Me In." Although "many more" volumes are promised in the Pebbles series, in fact AIP Records has closed out the series with the release of the final 2 CDs in 1999 and 2007."

The second CD offers generally more obscure tracks. "Travel Agent Man" by Sound Apparatus might be viewed by some as "take off" on "Secret Agent Man," albeit with veiled drug references. "You Gotta Run," by the Roosters from Los Angeles, is in a more melodic vein. The final cut, "Go Go, Girl," by the Hombres, was released as the B-Side of the single "Let It All Hang Out" in 1967, is attributed to an "unknown artist", and its lyrics' feature a male narrator expressing his frustration about having to "stand in line" to see his girlfriend become a "hip-swingin', fringe-slingin' Watusi go go girl" in the presence of other men.

Small-sized photographs of the cover artwork for eleven Pebbles CDs are provided in the inner sleeve foldout, including a miniature of the cover artwork for the Ear-Piercing Punk compilation. A micro-depiction of the Pebbles, Volume 4 (which focuses exclusively on vocal surf music) and Surfbeat behind the Iron Curtain compilations are also provided, though no surf rock or foreign recordings are included here. None of the tracks on the Pebbles, Volume 9 CD are included either. Unlike most of the AIP compilations, the liner notes are spare and convey little information.

== Track listing ==
=== Disc 1 ===
1. The Preachers: "Who Do You Love?" (Elias B. McDaniel)
2. The Grains of Sand: "Going Away Baby"
3. The JuJus: "You Treat Me Bad"
4. The Haunted: "1-2-5"
5. The Wilde Knights: "Beaver Patrol"
6. The Lyrics: "So What!"
7. The Green Fuz: "Green Fuz"
8. Teddy and His Patches: "Suzy Creamcheese" (Frank Zappa)
9. T.C. Atlantic: "Faces"
10. William Penn Fyve: "Swami"
11. The Tree: "No Good Woman"
12. The Plague: "Go Away"
13. The Gentlemen: "It's a Cry'n Shame"
14. The Omens: "Searching"
15. The Foggy Notions: "Need a Little Lovin'"
16. Dean Carter: "Rebel Woman"
17. The Lost Agency: "One Girl Man"
18. The Trolls: "Every Night & Every Day"
19. The Starfires: "I Never Loved Her"
20. Beckett Quintet: "No Correspondence"
21. The Dovers: "She's Not Just Anybody"
22. The Hysterics: "Won't Get Far (labeled as "Everything's There")"
23. The Good Feelings: "Shattered"
24. The Breakers: "I Ain't Dead Yet"
25. The Uncalled For: "Do Like Me"
26. GONN: "Doin' Me In"
27. The Mile Ends: "Bottle Up and Go"
28. Bohemian Vendetta: "Enough"
29. Keith Kessler: "Don't Crowd Me"

=== Disc 2 ===
1. The Motifs: "Someday"
2. The Shays: "Brainwashed"
3. The Sinners: "Sinnerisme"
4. Missing Lynx: "Hang Around"
5. The Mixed Emotions: "Can't You Stop It Now"
6. Thunderbolts: "Heart So Cold"
7. Strangers: "What a Life"
8. Roosters: "You Gotta Run"
9. Peter & Wolves: "Hey Mama"
10. Peter & Wolves: "I Can Only Give You Everything"
11. Sound Apparatus: "Travel Agent Man"
12. The Shades: "Down the Road Apiece"
13. Dynamic Nutones: "Sick & Tired"
14. Dry Grins: "You're Through"
15. Hustlers: "Sky Is Black"
16. Other Half: "Girl with the Long Black Hair"
17. Thorns: "I'm in Love"
18. Malibus: "I've Gotta Go"
19. Malibus: "I Want You to Know"
20. Creations: "I Want You"
21. [Unknown Artist]: "I Just Don't Know"
22. [Unknown Artist]: "Fed Up"
23. The Banshees: "I've Had It"
24. Roy / Bristols: "It's Your Fault"
25. Terry Dee / Roadrunners: "Some Other Guy"
26. The Hombres: "Go Girl, Go"
