= Pebbles, Volume 6 (1994 album) =

Compilation album
- Released: 1994
- Recorded: Mid-1960s
- Genre: Garage rock; psychedelic rock
- Length: 52:35
- Label: AIP

chronology
Pebbles, Volume 5 (1992)	Pebbles, Volume 6 (1994)	Pebbles, Volume 7 (1994)

Pebbles, Volume 6: Chicago Pt. 1, also known as Chicago 1, is a compilation album featuring American garage and psychedelic rock musical artists from the 1960s that were associated with the Chicago music scene. It is a compact disc installment of the Pebbles series, and was released on AIP Records in 1994 (see 1994 in music).

Included on the album are compositions recorded by lesser-known groups, grant an exception for the Buckinghams, associated with Chicago's burgeoning garage rock scene. Musical highlights included the opening track, "Searching", by the Omens, which was later covered by the Pandoras and Gravedigger V. The fuzz-toned raver, "I Want Her Back", by the Todds combine a raw intensity of garage rock with folk rock. Haymarket Riot's psychedelic-tinged "Trip on Out" advocated for the hippie lifestyle. Several personalized cover versions present on the album notably include a rendition of the psychedelic pop group the Lemon Drops' "I Live in the Springtime" by Buzzsaw, the Delights' recording of the Kingsmen's "Long Green", and a drastically demented version of "Jailhouse Rock" by Dean Carter.

Much of the material compiled on Pebbles, Volume 6: Chicago Pt. 1 is also available on the 1983 album Highs in the Mid-Sixties, Volume 4. The cover track listing does not correctly correlate with the sequence on the CD itself as the Huns' "Winning Ticket" is actually the third song; "Come with Me" by the Boyz and "Run Around" by the Cavedwellers are not featured on the CD; and the final track is a radio station promo. The following album in the Pebbles series, Pebbles, Volume 7: Chicago Pt. 2 also focuses on Chicago artists.

== Track listing ==
1. The Omens: "Searching"; Rel. 1966
2. The Furniture: "I Love It Baby"; Rel. 1967
3. Huns: "Winning Ticket"; Rel. 1966
4. Buzzsaw : "I Live in the Springtime"; Rel. 1970
5. The Todds: "I Want Her Back"; Rel. 1967
6. The Group, Inc.: "Like a Woman"; Rel. 1966
7. The Pattens: "Say Ma, Ma"
8. Haymarket Riot: "Trip on Out"; Rel. 1968
9. The Delights: "Long Green"; Rel. 1965
10. The Untamed: "Someday Baby"; Rel. 1966
11. Dalek/Engam: The Blackstones: "Never Feel The Pain"; Rel. 1965
12. Dean Carter: "Rebel Woman"; Rel. 1967
13. Shady Daze: "I'll Make You Pay"; Rel. 1967
14. The Little Boy Blues: "You Don't Love Me"; Rel. 1967
15. Nobody's Children: "Girl, I Need You"; Rel. 1967
16. The Buckinghams: "I've Been Wrong"; Rel. 1966
17. Last Knight: "Shadow of Fear"; Rel. 1968
18. The End: "Memorandum"; Rel. 1966
19. Dean Carter: "Jailhouse Rock"; Rel. 1967
20. The Foggy Notions: "Need a Little Lovin'"; Rel. 1966
21. Haymarket Riot: "Something Else"; Rel. 1968
22. The Warner Brothers: "Please Mr. Sullivan"; Rel. 1965
