= Pebbles, Volume 3 =

Compilation album
- Released: 1979; 1992 (CD)
- Recorded: Mid-1960s
- Genres: Psychedelic rock; garage rock
- Labels: BFD; AIP

chronology
Pebbles, Volume 2 (1979)	Pebbles, Volume 3 (1979)	Pebbles, Volume 4 (1979)

Pebbles, Volume 3, subtitled The Acid Gallery, is a compilation album featuring American underground psychedelic rock musical artists from the 1960s. It is the third installment of the Pebbles series and was released on BFD Records in 1979 (see 1979 in music). The album is marked for containing among the most unusual recordings of psychedelic music.

== Background ==
Compiling the most bizarre examples of psychedelia, The Acid Gallery opens with Higher Elevation's "The Diamond Mine", showcasing the nonsensical ramblings performed by lead vocalist Dave Diamond. The Jefferson Handkerchief's novelty song, "I'm Allergic to Flowers", mocks the flower children by lyrically telling the story of an individual who cannot become a hippie as a consequence of allergies. The narrative concept continues with "Flight Reaction" by Calico Wall, which describes the acid-drenched glimpse into the mind of a passenger concerned with crashing before takeoff in an airplane. A Frank Zappa-inspired instrumental on "Loose Lip Sync Ship" highlights a track supposedly recorded by the Chocolate Watchband under the moniker the Hogs. Side one concludes with the Driving Stupid's comedic number "The Reality of (Air) Fried Borsk", a tune music historian Richie Unterberger describes "Some listeners would subscribe to the 'it's-so-stupid-it's-brilliant' school; many would find the single unbearably amateurish and dumb. But of such things reputations are made, if only cult ones".

Opening the second side is the Third Bardo's "I'm Five Years Ahead of My Time", a cult favorite that was later highlighted on Nuggets: Original Artyfacts from the First Psychedelic Era, 1965-1968 in 1998 along with the subsequent track, "Voices Green and Purple", recorded by the Bees. Among the majority of the remaining songs, there is a pattern of remakes of compositions by more successful musical acts. Godfrey's "Let's Take a Trip" is based on Kim Fowley's "The Trip", the Monocles' "Spider and the Fly" is a revisioning of 1950s surf rock, and Race Marbles' "Like a Dribbling Fram"—which reached the top ten on the Canadian charts in January 1966—is a spoof of Bob Dylan's "Like a Rolling Stone".

1992 CD cover

The original LP listed "Horror Asparagus Stories" by the Driving Stupid between tracks seven and eight of the second side; yet, the song is not included on the album itself. Additionally, "Prana" is designated as a "bonus track" on the track listing. When AIP Records reissued The Acid Gallery in 1992 on compact disc, the missing Driving Stupid song was included along with an altered track listing and five bonus songs. Through "Spider and the Fly" and "Let's Take a Trip" are sequenced as the twelfth and thirteenth tracks respectively, the order is actually reversed on the album. All the material on The Acid Gallery also appears on Pebbles Box and Trash Box.

== Track listing ==
=== Side one ===
1. Dave Diamond & the Higher Elevation: "Diamond Mine"
2. Teddy and His Patches: "Suzy Creamcheese"
3. Crystal Chandelier: "Suicidal Flowers"
4. William Penn V: "Swami"
5. Jefferson Handkerchief: "I'm Allergic to Flowers"
6. [Bonus Track] Unfolding: Prana (excerpt)
7. The Calico Wall: "Flight Reaction"
8. The Hogs: "Loose Lip Sync Ship"
9. The Driving Stupid: "The Reality of (Air) Fried Borsk"

=== Side two ===
1. The Third Bardo: "I'm Five Years Ahead of My Time"
2. The Bees: "Voices Green and Purple"
3. The Monocles: "Spider and the Fly"
4. Godfrey: "Let's Take a Trip" (Kim Fowley)"
5. T.C. Atlantic: "Faces"
6. Mike Condello: "Soggy Cereal"
7. The Lea Riders Group: "Dom Kallar Oss Mods"
8. The Driving Stupid: "Horror Asparagus Stories"
9. Race Marbles: "Like a Dribbling Fram"

On this LP, "Flight Reaction," "Loose Lip Sync Ship" and "The Reality of (Air) Fried Borsk" have a delay echo added to them; also, "Loose Lip Sync Ship" has a stuck needle in the groove about halfway through. These problems were corrected on the CD version.

=== 1992 CD reissue ===
1. Dave Diamond & the Higher Elevation: "The Diamond Mine"
2. Teddy and His Patches: "Suzy Creamcheese"
3. Crystal Chandelier: "Suicidal Flowers"
4. William Penn V: "Swami"
5. Jefferson Handkerchief: "I'm Allergic to Flowers"
6. The Calico Wall: "Flight Reaction"
7. The Hogs: "Loose Lip Sync Ship"
8. The Driving Stupid: "The Reality of (Air) Fried Borsk"
9. The Driving Stupid: "Horror Asparagus Stories"
10. The Third Bardo: "I'm Five Years Ahead of My Time"
11. The Bees: "Voices Green and Purple"
12. The Monocles: "Spider and the Fly"
13. Godfrey: "Let's Take a Trip" (Kim Fowley)"
14. T. C. Atlantic: "Faces"
15. The Lea Riders Group: "Dom Kallar Oss Mods"
16. Race Marbles: "Like a Dribbling Fram"
17. The Painted Faces: "Anxious Color"
18. Adjeef the Poet: "Ieek, I'm a Freak"
19. Adjeef the Poet: "Squafrech Lemon Comes Back"
20. Beautiful Daze: "City Jungle, Part 1"
21. Catfish Knight: "Deathwise"
22. Oshun: "Rattle of Life"

== Release history ==
=== LP ===
BFD Records (#BFD-5020) — 1979

AIP Records – several reissues

=== CD ===
AIP Records (#AIP-CD-5020) — 1992
