= Essential Pebbles, Volume 2 =

Compilation album
- Released: 1998
- Recorded: Mid-1960s
- Genres: Garage rock, psychedelic rock
- Label: AIP

chronology
Essential Pebbles, Volume 1 (1997)	Essential Pebbles, Volume 2 (1998)	Essential Pebbles, Volume 3 (2000)

Essential Pebbles, Volume 2 is a compilation album in the Essential Pebbles series. Although subtitled Still More Ultimate '66 garage classics!, not all of the recordings on the album were originally released in 1966.

== Release data ==
This album was released on AIP Records in 1998 as #AIP-CD-1060. The cover drawing is a colored version of the cover of the Pebbles, Volume 11 LP, the first album in the Pebbles series that was released by AIP Records.

== Notes on the tracks ==
The first CD, subtitled "The Best of the Rest of Pebbles Vinyl LPs" collects previously un-reissued, mostly American recordings from the LPs in the Pebbles series that are making their first appearance on CD; also, the tracks on the second CD have been previously un-reissued in any form.

Perhaps because of complaints from purchasers of the first volume, more information is included in the liner notes in this second volume. For instance, Mike Stax in his 1998 review of Essential Pebbles, Volume 1 in the Ugly Things fanzine, groused: "Unfortunately also, we're left in the dark regarding any info on these groups". The following information about some of the bands was taken from these liner notes. The Rogues is one of at least 3 bands by the name that were recording in Louisiana alone. Evil Enc Group – also known as Evil Encorporated – is the only band on the first CD that has two included songs. Some of the members of Magic Plants are said to have later been in the Left Banke. "More than I Have" is an inventive psychedelic recording that was one of the best tracks on the higher numbered volumes in the Pebbles series and comes from a demo tape supplied by the band. "That Creature" is a bad-taste recording that includes the line "Leave that ugly thing from another planet", courtesy of a band from Georgia.

== Track listing ==
=== Disc 1 ===
1. The Rogues: "How Many Times" – Rel. 1966
2. Neal Ford and the Fanatics: "Shame on You" – Rel. 1967
3. Jelly Bean Bandits: "Generation" – Rel. 1967
4. Sonny Flaherty / Mark V: "Hey Conductor" – Rel. 1967
5. Denims: "I'm Your Man"
6. Evil Enc Group: "Hey You"
7. Ravin' Blue: "It's Not Real"
8. Jaybees: "I'm a Loner"
9. Spirit: "Man Enough for You"
10. Wig Wags: "On My Way Down the Road" – Rel. 1966
11. Four Fifths: "If You Still Want Me"
12. Soul Survivors: "Shakin' with Linda"
13. Magic Plants: "I'm a Nothing" – Rel. 1966
14. Live Wires: "Love"
15. Inmates: "More than I Have" – Rel. 1966
16. Les Sinners: "Nice Try"
17. Cole & the Embers: "Hey Girl"
18. Kama Del Sutra: "She Taught Me Love"
19. Sweet Acids: "That Creature"
20. Evil Enc Group: "The Point Is"
21. Danny's Reasons: "Triangles" – Rel. 1967
22. Baker Street Irregulars: "I'm a Man" (Elias B. McDaniel)
23. Dee & Tee: "Something's Comin'"
24. Yo Yo's: "Crack In My Wall"
25. Original Sinners: "You'll Never Know"
26. Les Lutins: "Laissez-Nous Vivre"

=== Disc 2 ===
1. Purple Haze: "Shades of Blue"
2. Dawn 5: "Mike's Bag"
3. Denny Noie / Catalinas: "It Ain't a Big Thing"
4. Fading Tribesmen: "More Feathers"
5. Lost Souls: "It's Not Fair"
6. Spires of Oxford: "But You're Gone"
7. Vistas: "Don't Know"
8. Chimes: "#38"
9. D. C. Drifters: "Louisiana Blues"
10. Dean Kohler: "Gooseberry Blues"
11. Children: "I Can Feel It"
12. Why Four: "Hard Life"
13. Why Four: "Not Fade Away" (Buddy Holly)
14. Doo & Diddits: "I'm a Man" (Elias B. McDaniel)
15. Night Watch: "The Good's Gone"
16. Night Watch: "Shake"
17. Rick & the Rivals: "Stricken by You"
18. Sinders: "Get Out of My Life"
19. Abstracts: "Always Always"
20. Crying Shame: "Come on Back"
21. Berries: "Baby Won't You Follow Me Down"
22. Outcasts: "I Wanted You"
23. Lunduns: "It's Gonna Be Alright"
24. Ye Court Jesters: "But I Still Love Her"
25. Checkmates: "Eyes on You Baby"
26. Inner Prism: "Bad Seed"
27. Classics 5: "Wine, Wine, Wine"
28. Inn Crowd: "Gotta Find a Girl"
29. Lawson and Four More: "If You Want Me"
