= William Penn Fyve =

William Penn Fyve aka William Penn V
- Also known as: William Penn and His Pals
- Origin: Palo Alto, California
- Genres: Rock, garage, psychedelic rock
- Years active: Mid to late 1960s
- Labels: Thunderbird; Beatrecords.com
- Past members: Ron Cox; Mike Dunn; Neil Holtmann; Dave Lovell; Steve Sweet; Gregg Rolie

William Penn Fyve were a garage rock group from Palo Alto, California who recorded the psychedelic classic "Swami". Their membership included Gregg Rolie and Mickey Hart.

== Background ==
The group started out in late 1964 at the College of San Mateo calling themselves The DiscCounts. The original founding lineup was made up of Ron Cox on drums, Mike Dunn on guitar, Neil Holtmann on vocals, and Steve Sweet on bass. The group had a similar visual style to that of Paul Revere & the Raiders revolutionary attire. With the exposure by Radio KYA, KFRC and KLIV, the group was one of the San Francisco Bay Area's most well-known popular groups at the time and were star attractions in their own shows. They opened for some major national as well as international acts. One long term member was Gregg Rolie who would later be in Santana and Journey. Mickey Hart was also a member of the band at one stage. The one single they released, "Swami" is considered a pop / psychedelic classic. They are also referred to as William Penn and His Pals.

=== Similarly named groups ===
There may be some confusion over similarly named groups from the same era. There was one group around at the same time with a similar name, William Penn & the Quakers who had a few singles including "California Sun" released on Len Stark's Philadelphia based Melron label. It is apparently a different group. There was also another similarly named band, Wm Penn and the Quakers who recorded for Twilight Records and for the Duane Records label from Sunnyvale, California.

== Career ==
In early 1965, with the current line up of Ron Cox, Mike Dunn, Neil Holtmann, and Steve Sweet, they added another member, keyboard player Dave Lovell. A few months after that, there were some changes to their line up and guitarist Mike Shapiro and bassist Steve Leidenthal came on board, replacing Mike Dunn and Steve Sweet. Then they changed their look to the revolutionary style. In 1966 Gregg Rolie came into the group, replacing Dave Lovell. Also that year, they auditioned for Scorpio Records but were unsuccessful in their bid. Neil Holtmann was also fired from the group that year. A song about a guru during a hallucination was written and became the song "Swami". In 1966 or 1967, their single "Swami" / "Blow My Mind" was released on Thunderbird 502.

They broke up around 1967 / 1968 after having an argument with Vern Justus over finances.

Greg Rollie later joined The Santana Blues Band after Carlos Santana caught them at the Longshoremen's Hall in San Francisco and asked him to join the new band he was putting together.

A CD album with early recorded material was released in the 2000s which included an alt-version of "Blow My Mind". It is believed that Mickey Hart plays drums on that version. Two of their songs, "Blow My Mind" and "Swami" are included on the Trash various artists CD compilation.

== Line up ==
=== Version #1 ===
- Ron Cox ... drums
- Mike Dunn ... guitar
- Neil Holtmann ... vocals
- Dave Lovell ... Keyboards
- Steve Sweet ... bass

=== Following versions ===
- Ron Cox ... drums
- Mickey Hart ... drums
- Neil Holtmann ... vocals
- Dave Lovell ... keyboards
- Gregg Rolie ... keyboards, vocals
- Mike Shapiro ... guitar
- Steve Leidenthal ... bass
- Jack Shelton ... guitar

== Discography ==
Compilation appearance
Act	Release	Catalogue	Year	Notes #
William Penn Fyve	"Swami" / "Blow My Mind"	Thunderbird 502	1966	

Album
Act	Release	Catalogue	Year	Notes #
William Penn and His Pals	William Penn and His Pals	Beatrecords.com BEATR 011CD	2009	CD

Compilation appearance
Act	Release	Catalogue	Year	Featured track	Notes #
Various artists	Pebbles Volume 3 "The Acid Gallery"	BFD Records BFD-5020	1979	"Swami"	as William Penn V LP
Various artists	Sounds Of The Sixties San Francisco Part 2	Phantom PLP-1005	1985	"Swami", "Blow My Mind"	as William Penn Fyve; LP
Various artists	Pebbles, Volume 2	ESD Records ESD-80262	1990	"Swami"	as William Penn V CD
Various artists	Great Pebbles; 31 Original '60s Punk & Psych Classics	Bomp MSI 13868	1993	"Swami"	as William Penn Fyve; CD
Various artists	The Essential Pebbles Collection Volume One	AIP Records AIP CD 1058	1998	"Swami"	as William Penn V 2 CD
Various artists	Trash Box: Wild Psychotic Garage Punk!!!	Hit Records CD BOXX 1	2004	"Blow My Mind", "Swami"	as William Penn Fyve
