= The Traits =

American garage rock band

The Traits were an American garage rock band formed in Pelham, New York, in 1967.(Not to be confused with the group with the same name fronted by Roy Head appearing simultaneously). The group's brief career is highlighted by their role as the studio recording band for the novelty song "Nobody Loves the Hulk", released in 1969. At the time of its distribution it was publicized by Marvel Comics, and since then the tune has appeared on compilation albums, covered by other artists, and remains a peculiar artifact among Marvel enthusiasts.

== History ==
The picture sleeve of the "Nobody Loves the Hulk" single.

According to the record producer and songwriter of "Nobody Loves the Hulk", Rosalind Rogoff, the Traits were a popular teenage band composed of students enrolled at Pelham Memorial High School. The group's lineup featured Mike Carrol (lead vocals), Dom Chicherchia (lead guitar), Bob Creaturo (bass guitar), Jim Klieforth (keyboards), and Bobby Williams (drums). Prior to "Nobody Loves the Hulk", the Traits appeared on the Ren Vell Records Presents: Battle of the Bands, Volume 1 compilation album in 1967, recording "High on a Cloud" for the release. In an effort to break into the music industry, Rogoff wrote songs that appealed to the Marvel Comics, which she explained in an interview: "I was a nerd then and still am. I’m not as nerdy as the Big Bang Theory guys are, but I was very much into comics when I was in my twenties".

Rogoff penned the lyrics to "Nobody Loved the Hulk", a novelty song about the origin story of the Marvel hero the Hulk, as well as the B-side anti-war composition "Better Things", while the Traits arranged the instrumentals. The single was published and advertised by Marvel Comics between 1969 and 1970, and 2,000 copies were sold via mail-order. The emerald-green record was covered by a picture sleeve featuring the Hulk and the lead song's lyrics, making it a highly-collectible novelty piece among both obscure garage and comic book collectors.

The Traits' later career is unknown; however, Rogoff ended her brief stint in the music industry to become a technical communicator. Retrospectively, the band's work has appeared on the compilation albums Pebbles, Volume 5, Pebbles, Volume 21, and Glimpses, Volume 4, among several other credits. "Nobody Loves the Hulk" has also been revived, noticeably being referenced in the 1992 installment of Hulk Annual #18, and covered by the Swedish garage band the Maggots in 2006 and the jazz group Tight Meat Duo the following year. The Maggots release of the song also presents cover art strikingly similar to the original 1969 version.

== Discography ==
Note: The Traits song "High on a Cloud" originally appeared on the 1967 compilation album Ren Vell Records Presents: Battle of the Bands, Volume 1.

- "Nobody Loves the Hulk" b/w "Better Things" - Queen City Records (QNS-101), 1969
