= Pebbles, Volume 1 =

Compilation album
- Released: 1978 (LP); 1979 (LP – BFD Records); 1992 (CD)
- Recorded: Mid-1960s
- Genres: Garage rock, psychedelic rock, freakbeat
- Length: 37:56 (LP)
- Labels: Mastercharge, BFD, AIP

chronology
Pebbles, Volume 1 (1978)	Pebbles, Volume 2 (1979)

Professional ratings
Review scores
Source	Rating
AllMusic	4.5/5 stars
Spin Alternative Record Guide	8/10

Pebbles is a compilation of US underground and garage rock single record releases from the mid- to late 1960s. It had a limited original release in 1978 and a more general release in 1979 (where the album was identified simply as Pebbles). It was followed by several subsequent Pebbles compilations and albums (nearly 100 in all). This album is nowadays known as Pebbles, Volume 1 and was originally issued in 1978 as Pebbles, Volume One: Artyfacts from the First Punk Era, an obvious riff on Nuggets: Original Artyfacts from the First Psychedelic Era, a similar, groundbreaking compilation from 1972.

== Release data ==
Original cover

The Pebbles album was originally released as an LP on Mastercharge Records in 1978 as a collaborative effort of several collectors in a limited edition of just 500 copies. The album had no catalogue number and a plain pink-and-black cover sheet; it had the appearance of a bootleg recording. Greg Shaw was probably one of the collectors involved in this album, since the on-line listing of the original liner notes is marked as being "Courtesy of Greg Shaw". The AIP label that he founded released the later volumes in the series. The Mastercharge label appears to have been created only for this release and is apparently not a real record company.

The tracks were taken directly from the original vinyl or cassette dubs, not the master tapes. Many members of the bands included on the album were difficult to find. The scratch heard on the first track, "Action Woman", was so warmly thought of that it continued to be reproduced on subsequent reissues.

The liner notes to Volume 1 are attributed to "Nigel Strange", a suspected alias of Greg Shaw.

The release of this album on BFD in 1979 gained the record and the Pebbles series wide recognition. AIP kept the LP in print for many years.

AIP issued the first volume in the Pebbles series in CD format in 1992. Although the CD has bonus tracks and a colored cover, the two formats are largely the same album and even have similar catalogue numbers. Also, ESD released an earlier edition of Pebbles, Volume 1 on CD in 1989 with almost completely different tracks.

Two box sets of the first five volumes of the Pebbles series have also been released, the Pebbles Box on LP (in 1987) and the Trash Box on CD (in 2004). More recently, the first 10 volumes and the first 5 volumes in the Pebbles series are being marketed together as a package, in a rigid polypropylene envelope with the original Pebbles Box cover.

In 2008, apparently in honor of the 30th anniversary of this landmark compilation album, Bomp began offering a reissue of the first Pebbles album in clear vinyl, complete with a reproduction of the original pink insert. As with the original release, this special reproduction is limited to 500 copies. This edition was made with the BFD masters, so the skip in "Action Woman" is still in place, and "Crackin' Up" by the Wig is missing.

== Omitted tracks on the CD ==
CD cover

Due to a mastering error, the tracks printed on the cover copy for the CD differ somewhat from the tracks actually included on the album. Two songs were listed on the tray card that are not included on the album: "Crackin' Up", by the Wig (which was included on both the original LP as well as the BFD reissue) and "I Need Love" by the Third Booth (which was to have been a bonus track). Also, the Shadows of Knight song is split into two tracks on the CD.

Also, when AIP issued the early volumes of CDs, they omitted some tracks from the corresponding LP for the stated reason that they were already widely available on other anthologies. In this case, another track on the LP is not included on the CD: "Going All the Way", by the Squires.

== Notes on the tracks ==
The music on this first volume sets the tone for the obscure music collected in the Pebbles series. The first cut on the LP includes a skip during the break – on the original record, according to the liner notes – scrambling the line: "You say you love me, girl, but why are you so cold", but otherwise not really affecting the enjoyment of this genuine classic. Despite the fact that the Litter released three albums and is among the most well-known bands on this album, "Action Woman" was almost unavailable without this skip for many years. For instance, the bonus track at the end of the CD is a 1985 cover of this song which also omits the line. (The artist is not given on the CD but is identified on the AIP Records website as Echo & the Bunnymen).

The frantic cover of the Count Five classic by Positively 13 O'Clock is from a one-time studio session that includes members of Mouse and the Traps; it also appears on a retrospective album of this band that was released on Eva Records. The cover of Dylan's "Like a Rolling Stone" is hilariously to the tune of "Louie Louie". "Spazz", by The Elastik Band, became a cult classic due to its inclusion on Volume 1, and was subsequently included on 1998's expanded Nuggets box set.

Songs by well known bands are normally not included on Pebbles albums unless they are curiosities, and the track(s) by the Shadows of Knight – famed for their major hit with Van Morrison's "Gloria" – is no exception. Following a brief clip of "Gloria", the band introduces themselves with corny yet charming answers – sample: "What kind of fans do you prefer?", "I prefer electric fans" – followed by a song that the band wrote "especially for you". "Potato Chip" was originally released only on a five-inch cardboard record (possibly as a promotion for a potato chip company) and is surely the most earnest ode to a snack food ever recorded.

The bonus tracks on the CD include one of the most beloved of all garage rock songs, "Blackout of Gretely" by GONN. Remarkably, the band issued a reunion album 30 years later (in 1995) with all new material.

== Critical reception ==
Gary Mullinax, writing for The Morning News of Wilmington, Delaware, found the album's sound "crude" but "also powerful." Charity Stafford of AllMusic described the CD reissue as "an excellent second step into the garage rock underground."

== Track listing ==
=== LP ===
Side 1:

1. The Litter: "Action Woman", 2:30 — rel. 1967
2. The Preachers: "Who Do You Love" (Ellas McDaniel), 2:11 — rel. 1965
3. The Floyd Dakil Combo: "Dance Franny Dance", 2:10 — rel. 1964
4. The Outcasts: "I'm in Pittsburgh (and it's Raining)", 1:56 — rel. 1966
5. The Squires: "Going All the Way", 2:18, — rel. 1966, vinyl-only track
6. The Grains of Sand: "Going Away Baby", 2:10 — rel. 1966
7. The JuJus: "You Treat Me Bad", 2:18 — rel. 1966
8. The Haunted: "1-2-5", 2:46 — rel. 1966

Side 2:

1. The Soup Greens: "Like a Rolling Stone" (Bob Dylan), 2:40 — rel. 1965
2. The Wig: "Crackin' Up" (Rusty Wier), 2:18 — rel. 1966, Listed on the Cover and Label, but Not Actually on the Album
3. Positively 13 O'Clock: "Psychotic Reaction", 2:00 — rel. 1966
4. Kim Fowley: "The Trip" (Kim Fowley), 2:00 — rel. 1965
5. The Elastik Band: "Spazz", 2:45 — rel. 1967
6. The Split Ends: "Rich with Nothin'" (Knox/Ellassen), 2:15 — rel. 1966
7. The Shadows of Knight: "Potato Chip", 3:23 — rel. 1967
8. The Wilde Knights: "Beaver Patrol", 2:16 — rel. 1965

=== CD ===
1. The Litter: "Action Woman" — rel. 1967
2. The Preachers: "Who Do You Love" (Ellas McDaniel)" — rel. 1965
3. The Floyd Dakil Combo: "Dance Franny Dance" — rel. 1964
4. The Outcasts: "I'm in Pittsburgh (and it's Raining)" — rel. 1966
5. The Grains of Sand: "Going Away Baby" — rel. 1966
6. The JuJus: "You Treat Me Bad" — rel. 1966
7. The Haunted: "1-2-5" — rel. 1966
8. The Soup Greens: "Like a Rolling Stone" (Bob Dylan) — rel. 1965
9. Positively 13 O'Clock: "Psychotic Reaction" — rel. 1966
10. Kim Fowley: "The Trip" (Kim Fowley)" — rel. 1965
11. The Elastik Band: "Spazz" — rel. 1967
12. The Split Ends: "Rich with Nothin'" — rel. 1966
13. The Shadows of Knight: "Radio Spot" — rel. 1967
14. The Shadows of Knight: "Potato Chip" — rel. 1967
15. The Wilde Knights: "Beaver Patrol" — rel. 1965
16. The Sparkles: "Ain't No Friend of Mine" — rel. 1967, CD bonus track
17. GONN: "Blackout of Gretely" — rel. 1966, CD bonus track
18. The Weeds: "It's Your Time" — rel. 1966, CD bonus track
19. Echo & the Bunnymen: "Action Woman" — rel. 1985, CD bonus/surprise track

== Release history ==
=== LP ===
Mastercharge Records (no catalogue number) — 1978

BFD Records (#BFD-5016) — 1979

AIP Records – several reissues

=== CD ===
AIP Records (#AIP-CD-5016) — 1992

== See also ==
- Pebbles series
