= Pebbles, Volume 5 =

Compilation album
- Released: 1980 (LP); 1992 (CD)
- Recorded: Mid-1960s
- Genre: Garage rock, psychedelic rock
- Length: 39:52 (LP)
- Label: BFD; AIP

chronology
Pebbles, Volume 4	Pebbles, Volume 5 (1980)	Pebbles, Volume 6 (1979 album) (1994)

Pebbles, Volume 5 is a compilation album in the Pebbles series that has been issued in both LP and CD formats.

== Release data ==
This album was released on BFD Records in 1980. AIP Records kept the LP in print for many years.

AIP Records issued this volume in CD format in 1992. Although having a somewhat different cover, the two formats are largely the same album and even have similar catalogue numbers.

Two box sets of the first five volumes of the Pebbles series have also been released, the Pebbles Box on LP (in 1987) and the Trash Box on CD (in 2004).

== Omitted tracks on the CD ==
CD cover.

When AIP Records issued the early volumes of CDs, they omitted some tracks from the corresponding LP for the stated reason that they were already widely available on other anthologies. In this case, all of the tracks on the LP are included on the CD and in the same order, although "You Need Love" shows a different band name. Thus, the CD has only 3 bonus tracks.

== Track listing ==
=== LP ===
Side 1:

1. The Tree: "No Good Woman", 2:36" – rel. 1967
2. The Plague: "Go Away", 1:51
3. The Magi: "You Don't Know Me", 2:28
4. The Gentlemen: "It's a Cry'n Shame", 2:30
5. The 5 Canadians: "Writing on the Wall", 2:18
6. The Dirty Wurds: "Why", 2:19
7. The Merry Dragons: "Universal Vagrant", 2:54 – rel. 1966
8. The Fe-Fi-Four Plus 2: "I Wanna Come Back (From the World of LSD)", 2:16

Side 2:

1. The Escapades: "I Tell No Lies", 1:59
2. Danny & the Escorts: "You Need Love", 2:32
3. The Satyrs: "Yesterday's Hero", 2:41
4. Little Phil & the Night Shadows: "The Way it Used to Be", 2:01
5. The State of Mind: "Move", 2:09
6. Yesterday's Children: "Wanna Be with You", 2:27
7. The Time Stoppers: "I Need Love", 2:30
8. Thursday's Children: "You'll Never Be My Girl", 2:03
9. The 12 A.M.: "The Way I Feel", 2:18 – rel. 1967

=== CD ===
1. The Tree: "No Good Woman" — rel. 1967
2. The Plague: "Go Away" — rel. 1966?
3. The Magi: "You Don't Know Me" — rel. 1971?
4. The Gentlemen: "It's a Cryin' Shame" — rel. 1966?
5. The Five Canadians: "Writing on the Wall" — rel. 1966
6. Dirty Wurds: "Why" — rel. 1966
7. The Merry Dragons: "Universal Vagrant" — rel. 1966
8. The Fe-Fi-Four Plus 2: "I Wanna Come Back (From the World of LSD)" — rel. 1967?
9. The Escapades: "I Tell No Lies" — rel. 1966
10. Danny and the Counts: "You Need Love" — rel. 1966
11. The Satyrs: "Yesterday's Hero" — rel. 1967?
12. Little Phil & the Night Shadows: "The Way It Used to Be" — rel. 1966
13. The State of Mind: "Move" — rel. 1967?
14. Yesterday's Children: "Wanna Be with You" — rel. 1966?
15. The Time Stoppers: "I Need Love" — rel. 1967
16. Thursday's Children: "You'll Never Be My Girl" — rel. 1966
17. The 12 A.M.: "The Way I Feel" — rel. 1967
18. The Shags: "Stop & Listen" — rel. 1967
19. The Sound Barrier: "(My) Baby's Gone" — rel. 1966?
20. The Traits: "High on a Cloud" — rel. 1966?

== Release history ==
=== LP ===
BFD Records (#BFD-5022) — 1979

AIP Records – several reissues

=== CD ===
AIP Records (#AIP-CD-5022) — 1992
