= Danny and the Counts =

American garage rock band

- Origin: El Paso, Texas, United States
- Genres: Garage rock; R&B; psychedelic; Chicano rock
- Years active: 1960s
- Labels: Frogdeath, Coronado
- Past members: Danny Parra; Javier Valenzuela; Eric Huereque; Joe Huereque; Joe Martinez; Ken Prichard

Danny and the Counts were an American garage rock band from El Paso, Texas, who were active in the 1960s. They had a local hit with their 1965 R&B-flavored debut single, "For Your Love", but afterward switched their approach to reflect British Invasion influence. In 1966 they released a single on Coronado Records featuring the two songs for which they have become best-known, "You Need Love" and "Ode to the Wind". In the intervening years their work has come to be highly regarded by garage rock enthusiasts.

== History ==
Danny and the Counts were formed in 1964 and came from the Clardy neighborhood on the east side of El Paso, Texas. The group's original lineup consisted of Danny Parra on guitar and lead vocals, Joe Martinez on tambourine and backing vocals, brothers Eric Huereque on bass and vocals and Joe Huereque on drums, as well as the brothers' cousin, Javier Valenzuela on lead guitar and vocals. The band was initially influenced by R&B and had originally intended to include a horn section, but chose instead the format of a small rock combo. Another factor was that they became increasingly influenced by the British Invasion. According to Danny Parra:

Although I was indeed interested in R&B type music back in the day, it was an absolute nightmare to put together and organize a large (8–12) R&B band in El Paso that could ever hope to compete with the likes of The Night Dreamers, The Valiants, The Premiers, etc. which were all fantastic bands in that genre of music in El Paso... My interests and my best friend Eric Huereque started to notice the music trends going on in England via the Beatles and Stones, etc. Not only was their music cool and different but their groups were usually only four or five guys! Much more attainable we thought... so we one summer Eric and I were jamming on guitars and we noticed Eric's little brother Joe drumming in the corner of the room with a couple of yellow lead pencils... and keeping pretty good time at that. We eventually enlisted (after much persuasion) him to try learning some basic beats for our jam sessions. Took a while but we encouraged him.

The band enlisted the Huereque 's cousin, Javier Valenzuela, to play lead guitar. They arranged with local Disc Jockey Steve Crosno at KELP, to record and release two songs on his Frogdeath label, "For Your Love", written by Ed Townsend, which was released as the A-side, backed with "It's All Over". They recorded the songs in live single takes in Steve's home without a drummer. Crosno had initially planned to ply the songs only as a dry run, but decided to put them on vinyl since to help promote the radio station. Crosno was one of El Paso's most popular DJ's at the time. "For Your Love" was released at the same time the Righteous Brothers released their version of the song nationwide and the two records were played back-to-back on KELP. Both records made it up to number ten on KELP's top 20 and both were played on "The Crosno's Hop" show.

Up to now, the group's orientation had been in R&B, which was also Crosno's specialty in promoting, but the band decided to switch its focus towards the British-influenced beat sound, much to the disappointment of Crosno. According to Parra:

...after countless hours of practice (weeks, months, lifetimes it seemed sometimes) and many horrible and worse experimental gigs we started to focus more on the "English sound" and less on R&B. To make a name for ourselves with this new image and music direction was a herculean task in El Paso because we were all Latinos. If you were a band with Latinos it was expected that you played only R&B style music back in those days.

Crosno arranged with Coronado Records to release their next single containing what are now their two best-known songs, in what was a self-funded project. According to Parra, "...the songs were recorded as live single takes in a dumpy downtown El Paso recording studio for the princely sum of $75.00 (included master tape). The fee was for an hour of recording studio time..." The A-side featured raga-tinged "You Need Love". The B-side was an eerie ballad, "Ode to the Wind", that was highlighted by Valensuela and Parra's delicate guitar lines. In both songs Valenzuela used a fuzz-toned electric guitar, creating a sound that some have mistaken for a sitar. Both songs were published by Chiyo Music through BMI. In late 1966, Danny Parra was drafted into the Navy and Ken Prichard joined on guitar. The band continued for several years under different lineups in Parra's absence.

Ken Prichard later joined Brand X. Upon returning from the Navy, Danny Parra moved to California and worked as an electronics engineer. Eric Huereque died in 2003 at the age of 56. In the intervening years, Danny and the Counts' music has come to the attention of garage rock enthusiasts and commentators. Chris Bishop in Garage Hangover states, "Danny and the Counts 'You Need Love' is a signature tune of the mid-60s, with its unforgettable buzzing guitar riff and opening 'Oh, yeah!'". Cosmic Mind at Play ranks "You Need Love" b/w "Ode to the Wind" as a classic garage rock single. According to Danny Parra:

"Ironically, I am astounded and flattered that our music seems to somehow endured through other band's interpretations on their albums and through some compilation albums that you can still buy today that showcased much of the music happening in those days in Texas. There have even been some interesting video efforts (YouTube) made to fit our music".

Danny and the Counts' songs have been included on several garage rock compilations. "You Need Love" is include on Pebbles, Volume 5 (both the LP and CD editions) put out by AIP Records. "You Need Love" and "Ode to the Wind" both appear on Texas Punk from the Sixties, Volume 2. "You Need Love" is included on Sand Surfin': El Paso Rock, Volume 9.

== Membership ==
- Danny Parra (guitar and lead vocals)
- Javier Valenzuela (lead guitar and vocals)
- Eric Huereque (bass and vocals)
- Joe Huereque (drums)
- Joe Martinez (tambourine and vocals)
- Ken Prichard (guitar)

== Discography ==
- "For Your Love" b/w "It's All Over" (Frogdeath 4, 1965)
- "You Need Love" b/w "Ode to the Wind" (Coronado 136, August 1966)

== Bibliography ==
- Markesich, Mike (2012). Teenbeat Mayhem (1st ed.). Branford, Connecticut: Priceless Info Press. ISBN 978-0-985-64825-1.
