= Pebbles, Volume 4 =

Compilation album
- Released: 1979 (LP); 1992 (CD)
- Recorded: Mid-1960s
- Genre: Surf rock
- Label: BFD; AIP

chronology
Pebbles, Volume 3 (1979)	Pebbles, Volume 4 (1979)	Pebbles, Volume 5 (1980)

Pebbles, Volume 4 is a compilation album in the Pebbles series that has been issued in both LP and CD formats. Unlike other volumes in the series – which compile obscure garage rock and psychedelic rock music – Volume 4 collects rare examples of surf rock. The LP is subtitled Summer Means Fun, while the CD is subtitled Surf N Tunes. Another Pebbles, Volume 4 was issued on CD a few years earlier by ESD Records and has completely different tracks.

== Release data ==
This album was released on BFD Records in 1979. AIP Records kept the LP in print for many years.

AIP Records issued this volume in CD format in 1992. Although having a different cover, the two formats are largely the same album and even have similar catalogue numbers.

Although two box sets that purport to be the first five volumes of the Pebbles series have been released – the Pebbles Box on LP (in 1987) and the Trash Box on CD (in 2004) – none of the tracks on Pebbles, Volume 4 are included on either box set.

== Omitted tracks on the CD ==
CD Cover

When AIP Records issued the early volumes of CDs, they omitted some tracks from the corresponding LP for the stated reason that they were already widely available on other anthologies. In this case, only about half of the tracks on the LP were included on the CD; even the opening cut on the LP from which the subtitle is taken – "Summer Means Fun" by Bruce & Terry – was left off; thus, the CD has a different subtitle, "Surf N Tunes". The numerous bonus tracks on the CD include the corresponding "School is a Drag" by Superstocks to go with the curious pro-school song by The Wheel Men.

== Notes on the tracks ==
As on the first two volumes, an odd track from a well-known artist – Jan & Dean in this instance, performing on a commercial for Coca-Cola – is included on the album. Lloyd Thaxton had a widely syndicated pop music television program in the 1960s, The Lloyd Thaxton Show. Dave Edmunds – the only artist represented who is not American – had numerous hit songs in the late 1970s and early 1980s, including 1970's international success, "I Hear You Knocking." The Trashmen are renowned for their 1963 hit "Surfin' Bird" and are a prolific enough band that a 4-CD box set was released several years ago on Sundazed.

== Track listing ==
=== LP ===
Side 1:

1. Bruce & Terry: "Summer Means Fun"
2. The Fantastic Baggys: "Anywhere the Girls Are"
3. The Four Speeds: "R.P.M."
4. Jan & Dean: [Bonus Track]
5. California Suns: "Masked Grandma"
6. The Dantes: "Top down Time"
7. The Pyramids: "Custom Caravan"
8. The Rivieras: "California Sun '65" – rel. 1965
9. The Trashmen: "New Generation"

Side 2:

1. The Survivors: "Pamela Jean"
2. Gary Usher: "Sacramento"
3. Sharon Marie: "Thinkin' 'bout You Baby"
4. The Knights: "Hot Rod High"
5. The Wheel Men: "School Is a Gas” – rel. 1964
6. Lloyd Thaxton: "Image of a Surfer"
7. The City Surfers: "Beach Ball"
8. Dave Edmunds: "London's a Lonely Town" (Dave Edmunds)
9. The Ragamuffins: "The Fun We Had" (Gary Zekley)

=== CD ===
1. California Suns: "Masked Grandma"
2. The Dantes: "Top down Time"
3. The Pyramids: "Custom Caravan"
4. The Rivieras: "California Sun '65" – rel. 1965
5. The Knights: "Hot Rod High"
6. The Wheel Men: "School Is a Gas” – rel. 1964
7. Superstocks: "School is a Drag"
8. Lloyd Thaxton: "Image of a Surfer"
9. The City Surfers: "Beach Ball"
10. Dave Edmunds: "London's a Lonely Town" (Dave Edmunds)
11. The Ragamuffins: "The Fun We Had" (Gary Zekley)
12. Rally Packs: "Move Out Little Mustang"
13. Reveres: "Big 'T'"
14. Readymen: "Shortnin' Bread"
15. Bleach Boys: "Wine, Wine, Wine"
16. Esquires: "Flashin' Red"
17. Del-Vettes: "Ram Charger"
18. Gamblers: "LSD-25"
19. Brian Lord: "The Big Surfer"

== Release history ==
=== LP ===
BFD Records (#BFD-5021) — 1979

AIP Records – several reissues

=== CD ===
AIP Records (#AIP-CD-5021) — 1992
