= The Grodes =

American garage rock band

Background information
- Also known as: The Tongues of Truth, Sand
- Origin: Tucson, Arizona, United States
- Genres: Garage rock, rock and roll, protopunk, pop rock
- Years active: 1965-1968
- Labels: Tri-m, Rally, Impression, Splitsound
- Past members: Manny Freiser; Dale Smith; Rick Cota-Robles; Rick Lust; John Lee White III; Rick Mellinger; Pete Peterson (drums, 1967-68), Keith Craig; Patti McCarron

The Grodes, sometimes known as The Tongues of Truth, were an American garage rock band from Tucson, Arizona, that featured lead singer and songwriter Manny Freiser, and were active between 1965 and 1968. They are best remembered for two Manny Freiser written songs, the original version of “Let’s Talk about Girls" (recorded as The Tongues of Truth, later covered by The Chocolate Watchband) and Cry A Little Longer, recorded by The Grodes, the #46 single on the All-Time Garage Rock singles chart. (Note: The Tongues of Truth WERE The Grodes, renamed The Tongues of Truth ONLY on single, Let's Talk About Girls.)

== History ==
The band was founded in 1965 in Tucson, Arizona. They were led by guitarist, vocalist, and songwriter Manny Freiser. The band's original lineup consisted of Freiser and Dale Smith on guitar, Rick Cota-Robles on bass, Rick Lust on keyboards, John Lee White III on drums. They released their first single, "Uh Huh Girl" on the Tri-M label in August 1965. Later in the year, Rick Mellinger (aka Cable Von Mar) replaced White on drums. They followed it up in December with another Tri-M release, the protopunk "Cry a Little Longer" b/w "She Got What it Takes." Their next single was issued in 1966 on Rally Records, "Love is a Sad Song" b/w "I've Lost My Way." They cut a single on the Current label in October under the name The Tongues of Truth, which featured an A-Side of a song written by Manny Freiser that would later be covered by the Chocolate Watchband, "Let's Talk About Girls," backed with "You Can't Come Back." Freiser also wrote several songs for fellow Tucson band, The Dearly Beloved. Again as The Grodes, the group released the single It's True What They Say (About Love) b/w Have Your Cake (And Eat It Too) on the Impression Label in July, 1967. Give Me Some Time, no B-Side, was released on the Splitsound Label in December 1967. After Patti McCarron joined in Spring of 1968, the group renamed itself Spring Fever, and released the single, Sand, no B-Side, in June, 1968. The band broke up in August, 1968, when Patti McCarron and Manny Freiser became a duet, later recording as Fire & Rain in the 1970s. In 1967, drummer Rick Mellinger departed and was replaced by Pete Peterson. Keith Craig came in on keyboards after Rick Lust left the band. In 1968, the band brought in Patti McCarron on vocals, but broke up shortly thereafter.

In the intervening years the band's work has come to the attention of garage rock collectors and enthusiasts. Many of the songs recorded by both The Grodes are included on the CD compilation Let's Talk About Girls! Music From Tucson 1964-1968. The songs "Let's Talk about Girls" and "Cry a Little Longer" appear on the Trash Box 5-CD compilation, put out by Hit Records, and "Cry a Little Longer" is included on its 5-disc LP counterpart, the Pebbles Box. Both Let's Talk About Girls and Cry A Little Longer have been covered by several artists. Let's Talk About Girls was covered by The Undertones, The Pretty Things, The Hypstrz—and German girl group The Brood (who appropriately renamed it Let's Talk About Boys). Cry A Little longer has been released as video by groups including Imperial State Electric, Yard Trauma and Better Men Than You.

== Members ==
- Manny Freiser aka Fries (songwriter, lead vocalist, rhythm guitar)
- Patti McCarron (lead vocalist, 1968)
- Dale Smith (lead guitar, vocals)
- Rick Cota-Robles aka CR (bass, vocals)
- Rick Lust (keyboards, 1965-1966)
- Keith Craig (keyboards, 1967-1968)
- John Lee White III (drums, 1964-1965)
- Rick Mellinger aka Cable von Marr (drums, 1965-1966)
- Pete Peterson (drums, 1967–68),

== Discography ==
=== Singles ===
- "Uh Huh Girl" b/w "She Got What It Takes" (Tri-M 1001, August 1965)
- "Cry a Little Longer" b/w "She's Got What It Takes" (Tri-M 1002, December 1965)
- "Love Is a Sad Song" b/w "I've Lost My Way" (Rally 5005, 1966)
- "Let's Talk About Girls" b/w "You Can't Come Back" (as the Tongues of Truth) (Current 112, October 1966)
- "(It's True) What They Say About Love" b/w "Have Your Cake" (Impression 114, July 1967)
- "Give Me Some Time" (Splitsound 4, December 1967)
- "Sand" b/w "Give Me Some Time" (as Spring Fever), (Splitsound 8, June 1968)

=== Anthology ===
- Let’s Talk About Girls! Music from Tucson 1964-1968 (Bacchus Archives/Dionysus Records, rel. 1997)
