= The Cannibals (band) =

British rock band

- Also known as: Mike Spenser and The Cannibals
- Origin: London, England
- Genres: Garage punk, garage rock, garage rock revival, punk rock
- Years active: 1976–present
- Labels: Hit Records, Big Cock Records, Homestead Records, GMG, Big Beat Records
- Members: Mike Spenser; Tony Rathskeller; Max Demata; Patrice Picard
- Past members: Peter Revez; Ben Donnely; Peter Gunn; Johnny Johnson; Richard Jones; Tony Oliver; Jay Wiffen
- Website: http://www.myspace.com/thecannibalslondon

The Cannibals are a British garage punk band formed in 1976 by Mike Spenser, formerly of The Count Bishops, after his new band, the Flying Tigers, had split up. They have released seven full-length albums, numerous singles, EP's, split LP's, and appeared on several compilations.

== Line-up ==
=== Current members ===
- Mike Spenser - Vocals, Harmonica
- Patrice Picard - Vox Phantom VI
- Clive Leach - Bass
- Richard Jones - Furry Drums

=== Former members ===
- Ben Donnely (of The Inmates)
- Peter Gunn (of The Inmates)
- Tony Oliver (of The Inmates
- Dino Coccia (Drummer) on "Nothing Takes The Place Of You" & "Crystal Blue"
- Adam Blake (of Treatment)
- Virgil Tracy
- Johnny Walker
- Johnny "Mother" Johnson (of Thee Headcoats)
- Marco Valentino (Drums)
- Mike McCann
- Geff Mead (Bass - Guitar)
- Laury Picard (of Drunk Sincerity)
- Mark Wiffen (of Anti State Control)
- Sebastien Marks
- Dave Heard
- Barry Frost
- John Roland (Thee Headcoats)
- Patrice Llaberia
- Dave Good
- Doug "Kes" Forrester
- Clive Leach (Treatment)
- Richard Jones (drums) (Intestines, TV Slaves, BIRTHMARK)
- Chris Dalley (of Sundial)
- Jeremy Rice
- Mike Berry (The Intellektuals)
- Johnny Buck (The Polecats)
- Chris Dust
- Tim Arrowsmith
- Andy Cooper (The Leeches)
- John Moore (The Jesus and Mary Chain)
- Gary (Drummer, Friend of Dave Heard)
- Ben York-Barber (drummer)
- Tim Powell (RIP) Guitarist on Pills
- Eric Baconstrip (drummer, of King Salami & the Cumberland 3)
- Kamikaze U.T. Vincent (bass, of King Salami & the Cumberland 3)
- Gordon Russell (Dr. Feelgood)
- Steve Lewins (Count Bishops, Solid Senders)
- Kenny Harris (Motor Boys Motor, Screaming Blue Messiahs)
- Tim Brocket (The Commuters)
- Pierre (Bass)
- Fritz (German - Drums)
- Clive (Guitar)
- Oliver Katz-Debarge (Guitar)
- John (Tex Avery)

Eric Baconstrip (King Salami and the Cumberland 3)

- UT Kamakazi (King Samlami and the Cumberland 3)
- Patrice Picard (Guitar)
- Jay Wiffen (R.I.P.) - Guitars
- Peter Revez - Bass
- Max Demata (Bass)
- Gene Crazed (Guitar)
- Paul Hutchinson (Bass)
- Jerry Nolan (New York Dolls, Heartbreakers - one gig Upstairs at Ronnie Scott's with the Cannibals)
- Tony Rathskeller (Drums. Thee Rathskellers - The Psychomotor Pluck - The Fainas - Zero - The Rumble Fish - The Fish Revenge - Trash Experience)
- Mike Spenser (Vocals and mouth organ and some really not terrible guitar)

== Discography ==
=== Albums ===
- ... Bone to Pick (1982)
- Trash for Cash (1985) USA only
- Hot Stuff (1985)
- The Rest of ... The Cannibals (1985)
- Please Do Not Feed ... The Cannibals (1986)
- And the Lord Said ... Let There Be Trash (1991)
- Brunch with ... The Cannibals (2008)

=== Compilation albums ===
- The Brest of ... The Cannibals (1995)
- Brunch With...The Cannibals (2008) CD for Japan Tour
- Trash From Europe (2015)

=== Split albums ===
- Run, Chicken, Run (Volume 1) (with The Surfadelics) (1987)

=== EPs and singles ===
- "Good Guys" (under the name 'Mike Spenser and The Cannibals', No. 64 in John Peel's Record Box), Big Cock (1977)
- "Nadine b/w "You Can't", "Sweet Little 16", Hit, (1978 )
- "Pick 'N' Choose" b/w "I Could See Right through You", Hit (1981)
- Trash Flash! (1982)
- "Led Astray", Hit (1982)
- "The Submarine Song" b/w "Paralytic Confusion", Hit (1984)
- "Christmas Rock 'N' Roll" (1985), Hit
- "Kings of Trash" (under the name 'Five Young Cannibals') (1987)
- "You Drive Me Mental" b/w "Paralytic Confusion", Hit (under the name 'Five Young Cannibals') (1989)

=== Split singles ===
- "Are You Going to Stonehenge" (with Stoned Aid) (1989)
- "Axe the Tax" (with The Voice Of The People) (1990)

=== Various artists compilation albums ===
- The London R & B Sessions (1980)
- These Cats Ain't Nothin' But Trash (with The Milkshakes and The Sting-rays) (1983)
- Twenty Great Hits of The 60's (1984)
- Garage Goodies, Volume 1 (1986)
- Meltdown On Media Burn (1986)
- Garage Kings (& Junkyard Angels) (1988)
- All Night Garage Service (1991)
- The Songs the Cramps Taught Us (1992)
- The Trash Box (2004)
