= Essential Pebbles series =

The Essential Pebbles Collection is a series of compilation albums of obscure garage rock and psychedelic rock recordings that were originally released in the mid-1960s. As the name implies, the series was created by AIP Records as a distillation of the albums in the Pebbles series and the Highs in the Mid-Sixties series that had been released in earlier years. Only two more albums in the Pebbles series have been issued since the Essential Pebbles series was begun.

== Nature of the music ==
The first volume selects tracks from the first 10 CDs in the Pebbles series plus Ear-Piercing Punk, while the second volume collects recordings previously included on the LPs in the Pebbles series and Highs in the Mid-Sixties series that had not yet been reissued on CD. In the first two volumes, a second CD of "insanely rare bonus tracks" is provided in each volume. No information is provided about any of these recordings except that all but 2 are said to be previously un-reissued in any form. The third volume (both CDs) features recordings from continental European bands that had previously been featured in the Continent Lashes Back sub-series within the Pebbles series.

Each of the volumes in the Essential Pebbles series have as many tracks as many box sets: 55 in the first two volumes, and 48 in the third volume.

== Discography ==
- Essential Pebbles, Volume 1; released as #AIP CD 1958 in 1997
- Essential Pebbles, Volume 2; released as #AIP CD 1960 in 1998
- Essential Pebbles, Volume 3; released as #AIP 1964 in 2000

== See also ==
- Pebbles series

== Web Radio ==
- https://web.archive.org/web/20070312010015/http://www.radio60.dyndns.org/
