= The Trip (Kim Fowley song) =

Single by Kim Fowley
- B-side: "Big Sur, Bear Mountain, Ciros, Flip Side, Protest Song"
- Released: June 1965
- Recorded: 1965
- Genre: Psychedelic rock; garage rock
- Length: 2:00
- Label: Corby
- Songwriter: Kim Fowley
- Producer: Kim Fowley

Kim Fowley singles chronology
| "The Trip" (1965) | "Underground Lady" (1965) |

"The Trip" is a song written and recorded by American rock musician Kim Fowley. It first appeared on the A-side of Fowley's debut single as a solo artist, which was released in early 1965 on Corby Records. The song is regarded as one of the earliest examples of psychedelic rock. It would inspire the Doors' "Soul Kitchen".

== Background ==
Writing for AllMusic, writer Mark Deming labeled Kim Fowley as "a man willing to jump onto any passing pop culture bandwagon ever since he first discovered that rock & roll was a great way to make money and get girls (not necessarily in that order) back in the late '50s. But he was just a bit ahead of the curve [...] when he scored a local hit in L.A. with "The Trip". In November 1965, Fowley put out an advertisement in the Los Angeles Free Press promoting the remaining copies of the single.

== Critical reception ==
The song became a regional hit in Los Angeles, and was covered by noted deejay Godfrey in late 1965 and later by the Fire Escape in 1966. Writing for AllMusic, Mark Deming retrospectively reviewed the song, stating, "Fowley's wild spoken word rant" which involved "a ringing endorsement of some sort of behavior your parents would doubtlessly not approve of, though the initials LSD are never actually mentioned (the presence of a number of other three-letter acronyms, however, are on hand to hip off the hipsters). Head Heritage stated, "[Fowley's] narrative winds through a back catalogue of deadpan, brainpan imagery that predates not only The Deep's "Color Dreams" but with the song's arrangement and organ eventually lifted for The Doors' "Soul Kitchen".

Since its initial pressing, the song has appeared most notably on Pebbles, Volume 1 and the 1998 expanded box-set of Nuggets: Original Artyfacts from the First Psychedelic Era, 1965–1968. Godfrey's rendition, retitled "Let's Take a Trip", is featured on Pebbles, Volume 3. The track was also featured on the soundtrack for the 2008 film RocknRolla, directed by Guy Ritchie.
