= The Grains of Sand =

American garage rock band

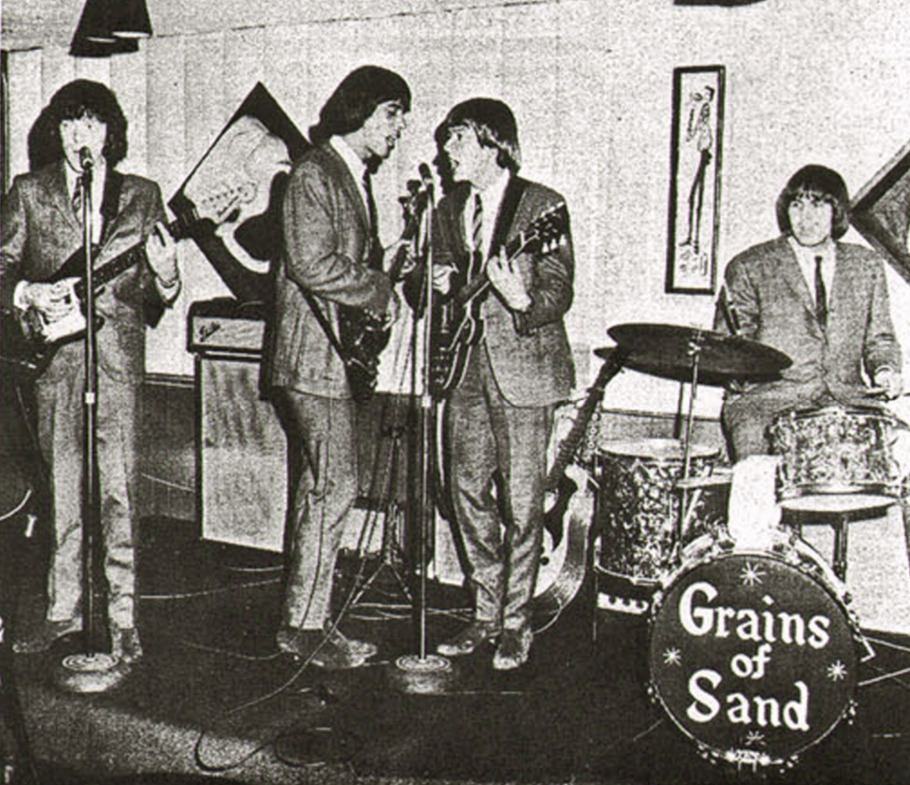

Background information
- Origin: Los Angeles, California, United States
- Genres: Garage rock; R&B; pop rock
- Years active: 1964–1969
- Labels: Valiant; Genesis; Philips
- Past members: Douglas "Red" Mark; Dave Hodgkins; Willie Schnider; Rich Brand; Kent Eaton; Jerry Yearwood; Jim Marshall

The Grains of Sand were an American garage rock band formed in Los Angeles, California in 1965. For a period, the group exerted a promising presence in Los Angeles's music scene, releasing three singles in their recording career, the second of which was produced by Kim Fowley. Much of the band's material found on their first two releases have since been compiled on several compilation albums, including Pebbles, Volume 1, and is cited by critics as classics of the garage rock genre.

== History ==
The Grains of Sand in 1966

Formed in early 1965 by R&B enthusiasts Douglas "Red" Mark and Dave Hodgkins, the first lineup of the Grains of Sand, originally known as the Rockin' Bugs, featured Mark (lead guitar), Hodgkins (rhythm guitar, harmonica), Willie Schnider (drums), and Rich Brand (bass guitar). The band almost immediately began making a name for itself on the Sunset Strip, pertaining to 21-and-up audiences a combination of cover versions of Top 40 hits and self-penned material, mainly written by Hodgkins. In mid-1965, the group began a two-week residency at the Whisky a-Go-Go and extended stays at the Red Velvet club and the Hullabaloo. Group manager Jay Coder signed the band with Valiant Records to a recording contract in early 1966. Around the same time, the Rockin' Bugs agreed to change the group moniker to the Grains of Sand, inspired by a pair of college students studying chemistry while the band members proposed possible alternatives.

The Grains of Sand entered Golden Star Studios in Hollywood to record "That's When Your Happiness Began", a catchy pop tune written by the Addrisi Brothers, along with the fuzz-tinged Hodgkins-original "She Needs Me". Session musician Hal Blaine took part in the recording of "That's When Your Happiness Began", which was released, coupled by "She Needs Me" as its B-side, in February 1966. The regional commercial success that followed resulted in the band acquaint themselves with record producer Kim Fowley. In December 1966, the Grains of Sand's second single was issued on the Genesis record label. A young musician that Fowley struck up a friendship with, and also a future member of the West Coast Pop Art Experimental Band, named Michael Lloyd co-wrote both sides of the release, including the farfisa organ-filled "Going Away Baby".

After signing to Philips Records, Schnider departed and was replaced by Kent Eaton. The band managed to record one more single "Nice Girl" in a mainstream pop style; however, the group was beginning to disband. Mark left to join the sunshine pop band the Sunshine Company in mid-1967, and was subsequently replaced by Jerry Yearwood. The final change that consequently signaled the end of the Grains of Sand was the loss of their creative-force Hodgkins in 1968. Despite attempting to amend the departure by recruiting singer-songwriter Jim Marshall, the band could not develop a chemistry and dissolved in 1969.

Since their disbandment, the Grains of Sand's material has appeared on several compilation albums. "That's When Your Happiness Began" is compiled on Highs in the Mid-Sixties, Volume 1 and What a Way to Die, while its flip side, "She Needs Me", appears on Off the Wall and Pebbles, Volume 8. "Going Away Baby" is featured on Pebbles Box, Pebbles, Volume 4 (ESD), and Essential Pebbles, Volume 1.

== Discography ==
- "That’s When Happiness Began" b/w "She Needs Me" (Valiant, 1966)
- "Goin’ Away Baby" b/w "Golden Apples of the Sun" (Genesis, 1966)
- "Nice Girl" b/w "Drop Down Sometime" (Philips, 1967)
