= The Dearly Beloved (band) =

American garage rock band

Background information
- Origin: Tucson, Arizona, United States
- Genres: Garage rock; psychedelic
- Years active: 1963–1967
- Labels: Columbia, Boyd, Split Sound
- Past members: Terry Lee; Tom Walker; Shep Cooke; Pete Schuyler; Larry Cox; Rick Mellinger; Gerald Livingston

The Dearly Beloved were an American garage rock band from Tucson, Arizona, originally known as the Intruders, who began as an instrumental surf rock combo, but eventually incorporated vocals into their sound after the rise of the British Invasion. After recording their first single as the Intruders, they changed their name to Quinstrels, recording one single under that moniker, but later settling upon the name for which they are best known, the Dearly Beloved. Along with the Grodes, they became one of the top groups in the Tucson area, scoring a #1 hit in there, and were on the cusp of breaking to a wider national audience, even briefly recording with Columbia Records and receiving some airtime on radios stations in other parts of the country, but were unable to maintain the momentum long enough to achieve wider success. Their work is nonetheless highly regarded amongst garage rock and psychedelic enthusiasts.

== History ==
=== Origins ===
The Dearly Beloved formed in 1963 as the Intruders in Tucson, Arizona, which along with an Air Force base, was also a college town, and had a healthy music scene and nightlife. Their original lineup consisted of Terry Lee and Tom Walker on guitars, Shep Cooke on bass, and Pete Schuyler on drums. They started out playing Ventures-inspired instrumental surf numbers, but following the arrival of the Beatles and the British Invasion, they decided to enlist the services of a vocalist and brought in Larry Cox. After winning a Tucson battle of the bands contest, the Intruders were awarded a recording contract with a small label, Gallantry Records, whose recording studio was located in the owners' living room.

Their debut single, "Every Time It's You," b/w Let me Stay appeared on the Gallantry label in 1964. By this time the Intruders, along with the Grodes, had become one of Tucson's two most popular local bands. Other popular bands there were the Lewallen Brothers and the Five of Us. They released two singles in 1965 on manager Dan Peters' Moxie label, "Then I'd Know" with the B-side "My Name," then later the fuzz-laden "Why Me" along with "Now She's Gone" on the flipside, before the prospect of legal action from another band in Detroit also called the Intruders prompted them to switch their name to the Quinstrels. The group issued their next Moxie single as the Quinstrels in 1966, "I've Got a Girl" b/w "Tell Her," which was record at Audio Sound Recorders studio in Phoenix, before changing their name to the Dearly Beloved, at the urging of local disc jockey Dan Gates at KTKT.

=== As the Dearly Beloved ===
Gates also convinced the band to record his own song, "Peep Peep Pop Pop," which he had written a few years prior and which the band proceeded to record at Audio Sound. According to Gates:

They hated the song, and maybe still do, but I managed to convince them that, while it may not be a big hit, it would be an excellent showcase to show the group's abilities. With that settled, we all agreed that we needed a better name for the group. I don't remember how many names were suggested, but none seemed to fit. We started looking through magazines and books. After a while, I was looking at a row of hardback books in a bookcase when I spotted a book entitled, Dearly Beloved. The group wasn't crazy about this name either, but they eventually gave in.

The song issued along with the flip side "Is it Better" on the New Mexico-based Boyd label in July 1966. The label accidentally printed "the Beloved Ones" on the label, but the song became successful, topping Tucson radio play lists throughout the summer of 1966, becoming the best-selling song in Tucson that year, staying at #1 for several weeks on the local charts. Label owner Bobby Boyd approached Columbia Records, who, in a buyout deal, signed them to the prestigious label and re-released "Peep Peep Pop Pop" in September, and it received some airplay nationwide, managing to bubble just under Billobard's Hot 100. Even a year later, on Dick Clark's "Rate a Record" segment of American Bandstand, it was chosen over the Count Five's "Psychotic Reaction". One factor limiting its success was that Columbia did not print enough copies. The Dearly Beloved played numerous gigs in Tucson and Los Angeles, making appearances at venues on Sunset Strip, such as Gazzari's and the Hullaballoo.

Columbia arranged for the group to make an album, so they traveled to Los Angeles to record it, cutting twenty songs over the course of three days. Columbia, disappointed with the result, shelved the project. Only a single, "Wait 'Till Mornin'," written by Tom Walker, saw official release in September 1966. Sensing that Columbia had no interest in promoting them, the band sued the label to be released from their contract, and eventually was let go. In frustration, the band's drummer Pete Schuyler soon resigned, Rick Mellinger switching over from the Grodes to become his replacement.

=== Tragedy and late period ===
In 1967 the band traveled back to Los Angeles to open for the Leaves and on the trip, were approached by representatives from White Whale Records, resulting in a contract offer. Lead Singer Larry Cox's wedding was scheduled to take place the next morning in Tucson. At 3:00 a.m. immediately following the show, the band departed for the drive home, taking turns behind the wheel. During the trip, the designated driver fell asleep and the car crashed in Yuma Arizona, killing Cox instantly on July 3, 1967. His death voided the White Whale contract, as terms dictated that the lineup remain exactly as stipulated. Shortly before the incident, Cox had written "Merry Go Round," which was coincidentally a song about death. The band was able to secure an arrangement with Split Sound Records. In 1967 the band released the unexpectedly prophetic "Merry Go Round," with Jim Perry sitting in on vocals for the deceased for Cox who had taken one final and fateful spin, as the B-side on their next single which featured the psychedelically tinged "Flight 13" on the A-side sung by Terry Lee. "Flight 13" become a regional hit. Bassist Shep Cooke quit shortly after that to join Linda Ronstadt's group, the Stone Poneys. After Cooke's departure the band started to unravel at the seams and eventually broke up.

=== Post-breakup ===
Since the group's demise, Tom Walker and Shep Cooke continued to play music professionally. Walker joined Butterscotch, who later became known as Jon Sorrow and cut a song included on the soundtrack album for the movie Hells Angels '69, and also did work for several months with country act Sunset Limited. Cooke founded the Floating House Band in 1970 with former Stone Poneys Bobby Kimmel. The Floating House Band also included Andrew Gold and Kit Alderson. Shep Cooke also played on albums with Jackson Browne, Linda Ronstadt, Tom Waits, later playing in a local band called the Seekers. Shep Cooke also released four solo albums of his own, including his self-titled album, Shep Cooke, Concert Tour of Mars, Live at McCabe's, and Everyday Hero. He also has played on various artists' records and composed some of the songs on Chuck Wagon and the Wheels' albums, as well as playing in the Floating House Band. You can learn more about Shep Cooke at ShepCooke.com. Pete Schuyler joined the Marines and has worked in electronics. Rick Mellinger became a respiratory therapist, becoming the director of the University of Arizona Medical Center respiratory unit, but stayed active in music playing with several bands. Terry Lee became a successful architect in Tucson. Tom Walker died on Friday July 20, 2007.

In 2005 the group briefly re-united with some of the members from their 1960s roster. The Dearly Beloved's work is highly regarded by garage rock collectors and enthusiasts. Voxx Records released their collected works on a self-titled LP anthology released in 1985, The Dearly Beloved. Their 1967 song "Flight 13" was re-issued on the Pebbles Box LP (Ubik Records) and Trash Box CD (Hit Records). The collected works of the Dearly Beloved and the Grodes were released on the 1997 dual anthology, Let's Talk About Girls: Music From Tucson 1964–1968 put out by Bacchus Archives.

== Personnel ==
=== Circa 1963–1964 ===
- Terry Lee (guitar)
- Tom Walker (guitar)
- Shep Cooke (bass)
- Pete Schuyler (drums)

Del Livingston

=== Circa 1964–1966 ===
- Larry Cox (lead vocals)
- Terry Lee (guitar and vocals)
- Tom Walker (guitar)
- Shep Cooke (bass)
- Pete Schuyler (drums)

=== Circa 1966–1967 ===
- Larry Cox (lead vocals)
- Terry Lee (guitar and vocals)
- Tom Walker (guitar)
- Shep Cooke (bass)
- Rick Mellinger (drums)

=== Circa 1967 ===
- Terry Lee (lead vocals and guitar)
- Tom Walker (guitar)
- Shep Cooke (bass)
- Rick Mellinger (drums)

== Discography ==
=== As the Intruders ===
- "Every Time It's You" b/w "Let Me Stay" (Lee) (Gallantry, 1964) (Galaxy 745–300, 1964)
- "Then I'd Know" b/w "My Name" (Lee) (Moxie 101, April 1965)
- "Why Me" b/w "Now She's Gone" (Lee) (Moxie 104, 1965)

=== As the Quinstrels ===
- "I've Got a Girl" b/w "Tell Her" (Lee) (Moxie 105, 1966)

=== As the Dearly Beloved ===
- "Pee Peep Pop Pop" b/w "It is Better" (Boyd 157, July 1966) (Columbia 43797, September 1966)
- "Wait 'Till the Mornin'" (Walker) b/w "You Ain't Gonna Do What You Did to Him to Me" (Walker)(Columbia 43959, January 1967)
- "Flight 13"(Lee/Lee) b/w "Merry Go Round"(L Cox)(Split Sound, 1967)
