= The Third Bardo =

American psychedelic/garage rock band

- Origin: New York City, New York, United States
- Genres: Psychedelic rock; garage rock
- Years active: 1967
- Label: Roulette
- Past members: Bruce Ginsberg; Damian Kelly died 11/25/20; Richy Seslowe; Ricky Goldklang died 8/14/26; Jeff Monn died 2023

The Third Bardo was an American psychedelic and garage rock band from New York City, New York. Their name is a reference to the book The Tibetan Book of the Dead.

The group existed for a brief time in the late 1960s. In 1967 they released their only single, "I'm Five Years Ahead of My Time", a song co-written by Rusty Evans (a.k.a. Marcus Uzilevsky), a former folk singer and leader of the psychedelic band The Deep, and Vicky Pike, the wife of the record's arranger and producer Teddy Randazzo. "Five Years Ahead of My Time" received some radio exposure until it was pulled for its perceived drug references, and only years later was recognized as a 1960s garage rock classic due to its inclusion in compilations such as the Pebbles garage/psych compilations.

Though short-lived, the band performed in local Manhattan venues, including Arthur's Tavern and Ondine. They also appeared on the Cleveland-based television show Upbeat.

The Third Bardo only had one recording session, which yielded six tracks in all including "Rainbow Life" which was released as the B-side to "I'm Five Years Ahead of My Time". Their Eastern melody and distorted guitar technique made the single distinctive to the rock scene.

The band broke up in 1967, soon after recording, and Jeff Monn began a solo career as Chris Moon. He released an album named The Chris Moon Group in 1970. The Third Bardo reunited for a performance at "Cavestomp" in New York City in 1999. In The New York Times, Jon Pareles wrote, "The band's earnest manifestoes -- about blown minds and the dawn of tomorrow -- arrived complete with buzzing, meandering lead guitar solos that were not ahead of their time, but a vivid memory of it."

== Discography ==
=== 45s ===
- "I'm Five Years Ahead of My Time" b/w "Rainbow Life" (Roulette 4742) 1967

=== Albums ===
- Lose Your Mind (Sundazed SEP 106) 1993
- The Third Bardo (Sundazed SEP 10-160) 2000

== Song list ==
1. "I'm Five Years Ahead of My Time"
2. "Rainbow Life"
3. "Lose Your Mind"
4. "I Can Understand Your Problem"
5. "Dawn of Tomorrow"
