= The Wilde Knights =

American garage rock band

- Origin: Longview, Washington, United States
- Genres: Garage rock
- Years active: 1960s
- Labels: Star-Bright, Modern
- Past members: Rick Dey; Rich Brown; Ray Kennedy; Roger Huycke

The Wilde Knights were an American garage rock band from Longview, Washington, who were active in the 1960s. They emerged from a group known as the Furys and later the Pipers VI, who recorded several frat rock records. After becoming the Wilde Knights, they wrote and recorded two songs in 1965 which were both released as singles that year and are now recognized as garage rock classics, "Beaver Patrol" and "Just Like Me", the latter of which later provided a huge hit for Paul Revere & the Raiders. In the late 1960s they evolved into Genesis (not to be confused with the British progressive rock band), the King Biscuit Entertainers, and American Cheese, and issued records under those various names.

== History ==
The Wilde Knights hailed from Longview, Washington and formed out of a previous group, known at different times as the Furys and Pipers VI, whose last remnants included bassist Rick Dey, who was born in Cromer, Norfolk, England, but whose family moved to the United States in 1956. In 1960s he joined the Pipers when they returned to Longview, Washington after doing a club residency in San Francisco. The Pipers had recorded several frat rock singles, but after their journey to Los Angeles, lost some of their earlier members and proceeded to assemble a new lineup that would eventually settle into Dey on bass, Rich Brown on guitar, Ray Kennedy on organ, Roger Huycke on drums. They changed their name to the Wilde Knights.

In 1965 the Wilde Knights teamed up with producer Paul Johnson to record two singles for his Star-Bright label. The first was "Beaver Patrol" b/w "Tossin' and Turnin". "Beaver Patrol", penned by Rick Dey and Rich Brown, contained sexually suggestive lyrics. Dey and Brown also wrote "Just Like Me", which became the A-side of their next single, also released in 1965, and would be adopted by Paul Revere & the Raiders in their smash hit cover version later that same year, which was credited to Dey and Raiders manager Roger Hart (not to be confused with the famous songwriter of the 1930s and 1940s), rather than Dey and Brown. The Wilde Knights' single, backed with "I Don't Care", got picked up by Los Angeles label, Modern Records. After the Wilde Knights, the lineup evolved into Genesis, the King Biscuit Entertainers, and American Cheese, all of whom released singles in the late 1960s. Dey moved to Los Angeles and played in other groups, but his career was cut short by an nitrous oxide overdose.

The Wilde Knights have become highly regarded amongst garage rock enthusiasts, many of whom regard "Just Like Me" and "Beaver Patrol," which is featured on Pebbles, Volume 1 LP and CD versions, as well as the "Pebbles Box" and Trash Box compilations, as classics in the genre. The Wilde Knights' complete recordings, along with tracks they cut as the Furys, the Piper IV, Genesis, King Biscuit Entertainers, and American Cheese are included on the anthology The Wilde Knights A.K.A. Furys, Pipers IV.

== Membership ==
- Rick Dey (bass)
- Rich Brown (guitar)
- Ray Kennedy (organ)
- Roger Huycke (drums)

== Discography ==
- "Beaver Patrol" b/w "Tossin' and Turnin" (Star Bright 3051, 1965) (Modern 1014, November 1965)
- "Just Like Me" b/w "I Don't Care" (Star Bright 3052, 1965)

== Bibliography ==
- Blecha, Peter (2009). Sonic Boom: The History of Northwest Rock, from "Louie Louie" to "Smells Like Teen Spirit (1st ed.). New York: Backstret Books (a imprint of Hal Leonard Corporation). ISBN 978-0-87930-946-6.
- Markesich, Mike (2012). Teenbeat Mayhem (1st ed.). Branford, Connecticut: Priceless Info Press. ISBN 978-0-985-64825-1.
