= The Fe-Fi-Four Plus 2 =

American garage rock band

Background information
- Origin: Santa Fe, New Mexico, United States
- Genres: Garage rock; psychedelic rock
- Years active: 1966–1968
- Labels: Lance; Odex
- Past members: Victor Roybal; Eddie Roybal; Mike Layden; Joe Abeyta; Ernie Gonzales; Danny Houlihan; Eddie James

The Fe-Fi-Four Plus 2 was an American garage rock band formed in Santa Fe, New Mexico, in 1966. Experimenting with inventive vocal arrangements and fuzz-toned guitar melodies, the group was a forerunner in the musical genre of psychedelic rock. The band released what is commonly agreed by music historians as the first psychedelic single by a native New Mexican group, with their first single "I Wanna Come Back (From the World of LSD)".

== History ==
Formed in 1966, the band was originally known as the Playmates and included Victor Roybal (organ), Eddie Roybal (drums), Mike Layden (lead guitar), Joe Abeyta (rhythm guitar, backing vocals) and Ernie Gonzales (bass guitar). The group soon recruited Danny Houlihan (lead vocals) and replaced Abeyta with Eddie James, who already had experience performing with the Champs. With the addition of two members, the Playmates decided a name change was in order. It was initially suggested by Houlihan to rechristen the group the Fe-Fi-Fo-Fum, the phrase said by the giant in the fairy tale "Jack and the Beanstalk". However, feelings toward the proposal were split and, as a compromise, they agreed on the Fe-Fi-Four Plus 2 (the total number of band members).

The band performed around New Mexico, developing a sizable following and hiring Tommy Bee as their manager in the process. Bee arranged a recording contract with Lance Records, resulting in the Fe-Fi-Four Plus 2 being guided through the recording process with record producer Norman Petty, who had past successes with Buddy Holly and the Fireballs. The group entered Norman Petty Recording Studios in late 1966 to record Houlihan's "I Wanna Come Back (From the World of LSD)", a song about an individual struggling to escape the horrors of a bad LSD trip. With bone-chilling wails and distorted guitar melodies, "I Wanna Come Back" has all the elements of early psychedelic rock. Speaking about the band's hallucinatory sound, Roybal explained why the group was eager to branch out from usual pop music: "We were looking for a new and original sound. Much of what we had been doing [was] performing top 40 sounds which people requested to hear."

In 1967, Lance Records released "I Wanna Come Back" with "Double-Crossin' Girl" on the Fe-Fi-Four Plus 2's first single. It is generally agreed upon by music historians that "I Wanna Come Back" was the first psychedelic song released by a New Mexican band. Original pressings of the record printed the tag line "(From the World of LSD)", until requests by distributors resulted in its removal. This slight alteration did not affect the single's sales, as the release's regional success prompted Polydor Records to issue "I Wanna Come Back" in Europe. In mid-1967, the Fe-Fi-Four Plus 2 recorded a follow-up single, "Mr. Sweet Stuff", not for Lance Records, but rather the small Odex label after Bee had a falling out with supervisors. The Fe-Fi-Four Plus 2 did not receive much advertisement support from Odex, and, as a consequence of the draft decimating the line-up, the group disbanded in 1968.

Since its initial distribution, "I Wanna Come Back" has appeared on numerous compilation albums, such as Pebbles, Volume 5, New Mexico Punk Groups from the Sixties, Pebbles Box, Sixties Archives, Volume 4 and Garage Beat '66 Volume 1: Like What, Me Worry?!.

== Discography ==
- "I Wanna Come Back (From the World of LSD)" b/w "Double Crossin' Girl" - Lance Records (#80-101-8), 1967
- "Pick Up Your Head" b/w "Mr. Sweet Stuff" - Odex Records (#DR-1042), 1967
