= The Dantes =

American garage rock band

- Origin: Worthington, Ohio, United States
- Genres: Garage rock; soul
- Years active: 1964–1969
- Labels: Jamie, Cameo, Main Line
- Past members: Barry Hayden; Dave Workman; Lynn Wehr; Carter Holliday; Joe Hinton

The Dantes were an American garage rock band from Worthington, Ohio, a suburb outside of Columbus, who were active from 1964–1969. They became one of the biggest groups in the Columbus area, scoring a #1 hit locally with their 1966 song "Can't Get Enough of Your Love", which has become highly regarded by garage rock enthusiasts and collectors.

== History ==
The Dantes formed in 1964 in Worthington, a suburb outside of Columbus. The earliest version of the group was founded by Richard Wakefield, but he soon departed, and after several changes in lineup, their roster settled to Barry Hayden on lead vocals, Dave Workman on lead guitar, Lynn Wehr on rhythm guitar, Carter Holliday on bass, and Joe Hinton on drums. Singer Barry Hayden was a charismatic front man, known for his stage moves. They were influenced by British Invasion invasion groups, such as the Rolling Stones, and covered several of the Rolling Stones' songs live and on their records. The Dantes became one of the most popular bands in the Columbus area. The Dantes appeared in several battles of the bands. At a contest held at Northland Shopping Mall, they lost to one of their chief rivals in the local scene the Rebounds, but the Dantes won their next battle of the bands (where they faced off with the Rebounds again) held at Valley Dale. Another popular group in Columbus was the Electras, later the Fifth Order (not to be confused with several other groups called the Electras during the period, such as John Kerry's band or the group from Minnesota).

The group’s managers were disc jockey, Johnny Garber and Chuck Swisher. Their first single was released in March 1966 on Jamie Records, and features its A-Side, "Can’t Get Enough of Your Love", co-written by rhythm guitarist, Lynn Wehr, and arranged by lead guitarist Dave Workman, featuring Byrds' inspired 12-string guitar picking. It was backed with "80–96" on the flip side, a blues-based instrumental that begins similar to "Ain’t Done Wrong", by the Yardbirds. According to Buckeye Beat the band had intended to name the instrumental "8–69", but the record label objected, believing it would be too suggestive. The A-side "Can’t Get Enough of Your Love", became a huge local hit, reaching #1 on local station WCOL's charts. According to Hayden:

We just know we were going to be huge stars, internationally famous, wealthy beyond imagining.

In September 1966, the Dantes released their second single in September 1966, released on Cameo Records, featuring the Mick Jagger & Keith Richards’s "Under my Thumb" b/w Brian Holland, Lamont Dozier and Eddie Holland’s "Can I Get a Witness, also covered by the Rolling Stones. The group’s last single appeared on the Main Line label and was produced by Walt Mansky, coordinated by Jerry Sharell. It features another Jagger & Richard song, "Connection" on the A-side, backed with the pop-flavored "Satisfied", which featured horn, signifing a new direction for the group. The Dantes opened for Jimi Hendrix at the Veterans Memorial Auditorium in Columbus. In the spring of 1968, Dave Workman had left the band and formed Dave Workman’s Blues Group, whose roster was made up of musicians from Columbus. The Dantes continued until playing through 1969. In January 1969, they changed their name to Moonstone. An advertisement appeared in 1969 in the Circleville Herald for a show by Moonstone, playing with the Fifth Order and Thee Young Generation, and another ad was run in April, 1969 mentioning their appearance with the Tree and the Fifth Order. The group disbanded shortly thereafter.

Singer Barry Hayden left the music business, going on to work at a Honda assembly plant in Marysville, Ohio and has for years worked as the director of guided tours at the Ohio Statehouse. In the intervening years, he has become active again in music. The Dantes reunited briefly on several occasions during the 1990s and early 2000s. They played two reunion shows in Columbus in 2008. Hayden now sings the group the Professors, whose repertoire consists of covers of British Invasion hits from the 1960s. Hayden, recognizing that any hopes of fame have long passed, insists, nonetheless, on doing it for fun:

It's the only thing in my life that has ever made sense. It's the one thing I'm good at. It's What I am. You shouldn't put it off—if you wait, if you think you'll get around to it someday, someday may never come.

The Dantes' work has come to the attention of garage rock enthusiasts and collectors. Their song "Can't Get Enough of Your Love" was re-issued on the 2005 compilation Psychedelic States: Ohio In The 60s Vol. 1, put out by Gear Fab Records.

== Membership ==
- Barry Hayden (lead vocals)
- Dave Workman (lead guitar)
- Lynn Wehr (rhythm guitar)
- Carter Holliday (bass)
- Joe Hinton (drums)

== Discography ==
- "Can't Get Enough of Your Love" b/w "80–96" (Jamie 1314, March 1966)
- "Under My Thumb" b/w "Can I Get a Witness" (Cameo 431)
- "Connection" b/w "Satisfied" (Main Line 1366, November 1967)

== Bibliography ==
- Markesich, Mike (2012). Teenbeat Mayhem (1st ed.). Branford, Connecticut: Priceless Info Press. ISBN 978-0-985-64825-1.
