= Floyd Dakil =

American musician (1945–2010)

Floyd Arthur Dakil (June 16, 1945 – April 24, 2010) was an American musician from Texas, best known for his often compiled song "Dance, Franny, Dance". He later went on to play guitar in Louis Prima's band.

== Biography ==
Dakil was born in Childress County, Texas. In 1964 his band won a competition to become the house band at the Pit Club, located at the Bronco Bowl in Oak Cliff, Texas. and soon released their first 45, "Dance, Franny, Dance" b/w "Look What You've Gone and Done" on Jetstar. The record was picked up for national distribution on the Guyden label.

Floyd Dakil went on to record three 45s on the Earth label as the Floyd Dakil Four.

In 1969 Floyd joined Louis Prima's band as guitarist, and remained with him for several years.

In 1975 he released a solo LP Live in which he runs through 42 songs in as many minutes.

In 1991 he contributed several songs to the soundtrack of the film Love Hurts credited to The Floyd Dakil and Larry Randall Band.

He was working in real estate, and teaching guitar lessons at the Grapevine Antique Mall in Grapevine, Texas, but occasionally appeared with reunited members of his original band under the name The Pitmen.

He died in 2010, at the age of 64.

== Discography ==
45s
Jetstar J-103 Floyd Dakil Combo Dance, Franny, Dance/Look What You've Gone And Done 1964
Guyden 2111 Floyd Dakil Combo Dance, Franny, Dance/Look What You've Gone And Done 1965
Earth 402 Floyd Dakil Four Bad Boy/Stoppin' Traffic 1965
Earth 403 Floyd Dakil Four Kitty Kitty/It Takes A Lot To Hurt 1965
Earth 404 Floyd Dakil Four Stronger Than Dirt/You're The Kind Of Girl 1965
Pompeii 45-66687 Floyd Dakil Merry Christmas Baby (I'm Coming Home)/One Girl 1968

Albums
FLOYD DAKIL: ...LIVE (LP)
Sunny Side of the Street / Band Intro / Longfellow Serenade / Lazy River / Everyday People / Yummy Yummy Yummy / Whiskey River / Buddy Holly Medley / Peggy Sue / Oh Boy / It's So Easy / That'll Be the Day / Forty Days / Johnny B. Goode / Mister Bojangles / Watermelon Wine / Let's Have A Party / C'mon Everybody / Cabaret / For Once In My Life / Pickin' And Grinnin' / Wildwood Flower / Steel Guitar Rag / Beverly Hillbillies (Theme) / Rose Of San Antone / Turkey In The Straw / Bonanza (Theme) / High Noon (Theme) / Gunsmoke (Theme) / El Commanchero / Orange Blossom Special / Holiday For Strings / Barnum & Bailey Circus Theme / Barnacle Bill The Sailor / Bye Bye Blues / Bridge On The River Kwai / Twelfth Street Rag / Lady Of Spain / Dixie / Overture By Puccini / Dueling Banjos / Satisfied Mind (ASHLEY ST-101 - recorded live at the Registry Hotel, poss. Dallas, Tx, May 31, 1975)

THE FLOYD DAKIL COMBO: DANCE, FRANNY, DANCE (Best of CD)
Dance, Franny, Dance / Look What You're Gone And Done / Bad Boy / Shiver / Turn To The Night / Kitty Kitty / You're My Kind Of Girl / Here I Am / It Takes A Lot Of Heart / Stoppin' Traffic / Bogged Down In The Bayou (COLLECTIBLES COL-5532 1995)

Several Floyd Dakil songs appear on CD compilations, including the well known Pebbles series.

== Notes ==
Sources
Article on Garage Hangover
IMDB Love Hurts page
Info about recent appearance
Floyd Dakil discography
Floyd Dakil's former business
