= The Bees (American band) =

American l rock band

- Origin: Covina, California, United States
- Genres: Garage rock; psychedelic
- Labels: Liverpool

The Bees was an American garage rock and psychedelic band from Covina, California, that was active in the mid-1960s, and was best known for the 1966 paranoiac anthem "Voices Green and Purple". The song has been mentioned as an innovative example of early protopunk.

The Bees, who recorded "Voices Green and Purple" are not to be confused with another band of the same name who were also active in the Los Angeles area at the time, who recorded on the Mira and Mirwood labels. The group who recorded "Voices Green and Purple" released it as a single on the Liverpool label backed with "Trip to New Orleans" in October, 1966. "Voices Green and Purple" has been cited by rock historian Mike Stax as an influential example of "acid punk". The song begins at a medium tempo, but then speeds up into a fast-paced thrash in the refrains. As Stax describes: "...when the song comes unglued the for the panic-stricken choruses, these guys were in uncharted waters." According to music critic Richie Unterberger, "The psychedelic touch was added not just by the florid and deranged lyrics, but by the choruses, where the tune disappeared, the drums sped up, and the scrawling guitars made ascending shards of noise." The single came wrapped in a paper jacket adorned with the kind of scrawled lettering and defaced imagery suggestive of later "D.I.Y." punk fanzines.

Original copies of the single are extremely rare and are considered some of the most valuable collectibles from the garage era. The song became a favorite of collectors after it was re-issued on Pebbles Vol. 3. It was also included on the Nuggets 4-CD box set many years later. In Mike Markesich's Teenbeat Mayhem, based on the balloting of a panel of noted writers and garage rock experts, the song is rated as a ten out of ten, and in the section listing the 1000 greatest garage rock recordings of all time, it is ranked at #13.

== Discography ==
- "Voices Green and Purple" b/w "Trip to New Orleans" (Liverpool 45-LIV-62225, rel. October, 1966)
