= The Driving Stupid =

American garage rock band

Background information
- Origin: New Jersey, United States
- Genres: Garage rock; psychedelic rock
- Years active: 1966
- Labels: KR
- Past members: Roger Kelley; Richard Ehrenberg; Jeff Hildt; Dwight Harris

The Driving Stupid was an American garage rock band formed in New Jersey in 1966. The group issued one cult favorite single called "Horror Asparagus Stories" that is most known for its absurd lyrics and psychedelic instrumentals. Though short-lived, the band's sole release has been included on numerous compilation albums. Previously unreleased material by the band was also issued in 2002.

== History ==
The group was formed by an assortment of fellow college students from New Jersey in the summer of 1966, including frontman Roger Kelley, Richard Ehrenberg, Jeff Hildt, and Dwight Harris. Coming together for more or less a lark, rather than a serious endeavor, the Driving Stupid was created to propel the members to national prominence with inane lyrical concepts and stage uniforms. Much of the band's musical content was marked by an unproportioned combination of surf rock, jug music, and nonsensical psychedelia, with explanatory vocals that are surprisingly melodious. The Driving Stupid is commonly compared to the West Coast Pop Art Experimental Band for both their unique moniker and unusual sound.

On their way to Los Angeles, the group stopped in Albuquerque to record seven demos and stir up interest from record labels. The Driving Stupid completed their journey to Los Angeles, enticing KR Records to sign the group to release their debut single and record an album's-worth of new material. In September 1966, the band released the novelty song "Horror Asparagus Stories", backed by the equally-nonsensical "The Reality of (Air) Fried Borsk". Music historian Richie Unterberger remarks "Some listeners would subscribe to the "it's-so-stupid-it's-brilliant" school; many would find the single unbearably amateurish and dumb. But of such things reputations are made, if only cult ones". To promote the single, the group toured briefly, however the release was a commercial failure. As a consequence, the Driving Stupid's proposed album project was blocked and, as 1966 concluded, the group disbanded as the members returned to college.

Despite their inability to achieve success in their existence, the band became cult favorites as a result of "The Reality of (Air) Fried Borsk"'s inclusion on Pebbles, Volume 3 in 1979. "Horror Asparagus Stories" appeared on the album's track listing but did not get placed on Pebbles, Volume 3 until its 1992 compact disc reissue. The track has additional appearances on Garage Beat ’66, Volume 4, Sixties Rebellion, Volume 12: Demented, and Acid Dreams, Epitaph. In 2002, Sundazed Music released all of the Driving Stupid's previously unreleased recordings and the tracks from the single on the album, Horror Asparagus Stories.
