= Dave Diamond =

American radio disc jockey (1936–2014)

- Born: Sidney Ivan Davison Jr. August 7, 1936; Howard, South Dakota, United States
- Died: May 5, 2014 (aged 77); Spearfish, South Dakota, US
- Occupations: Radio DJ, academic, author

Sidney Ivan Davison Jr. (August 7, 1936 – May 5, 2014), known professionally as Dave Diamond, was an American radio DJ whose programs in the late 1960s and early 1970s helped popularise many psychedelic and acid rock bands. He was also an academic and author, and in later years taught journalism as a university professor.

== Biography ==
He was born in Howard, South Dakota in 1936, the son of the owners of a local newspaper, the Miner County Pioneer. He attended Howard Public High School, where he was known as Slide Davison and won medals and championships playing basketball, football and golf. He served in the US Army 147th Field Artillery in the Korean War in 1953–54, and studied at Louisiana State University; the University of Southern Mississippi, where he studied journalism and history; and Northwest Missouri State University, where he gained a master's degree in English literature.

He joined radio station KOIL in Omaha, Nebraska in 1960, when he began using the name Dave Diamond. He later moved to radio stations in Knoxville, WIL in St. Louis and KBTR 71 in Denver, where he became one of the few radio reporters to join the Beatles on their 1965 US tour. He was then recruited by Bill Drake to join KHJ in Los Angeles in 1965 for the launch of Boss Radio, moving soon afterwards to KBLA in Burbank, to KFWB in '67, and then in 1968 to KFRC in San Francisco. At KBLA and KFRC, his show "The Diamond Mine", which contained a mixture of psychedelic music and poetry contributed by listeners and by Diamond himself, became one of the first "underground" rock shows and one of the most successful radio programs in California in the late 1960s. He was one of the first DJs to play records by the new wave of psychedelic and heavy rock bands and performers such as The Doors, The Seeds, Love, Linda Ronstadt and Iron Butterfly. He also became a music publisher, responsible for the Strawberry Alarm Clock's 1967 hit "Incense and Peppermints" among others. He recorded spoken word pieces in his own right for various labels including Columbia Records; his piece "The Diamond Mine", credited to Dave Diamond and the Higher Elevation, was included on the LP Pebbles, Volume 3 and several later compilations.

Diamond left KFRC in 1971, moving first to KRLA in Pasadena, and then to KDAY and KIIS in Los Angeles and WSAI in Cincinnati. He returned to Los Angeles in 1977 to work at radio station KFI. He retired from broadcasting in 1982. While living in California, he attended courses at UCLA and the University of Southern California, graduating with a master's in fiction writing, and also gained a PhD in holistic studies from Columbia Pacific University and a degree in religious science from the Institute of Religious Science in Los Angeles. He was a lifelong supporter and member of the Self-Realization Fellowship (SRF) founded by Paramahansa Yogananda.

In the mid-1980s he began teaching at Buena Vista University in Storm Lake, Iowa, before moving to Morningside College in Sioux City, where he chaired the communication department and set up new radio and cable television stations. He later moved to Black Hills State University, where he taught journalism and broadcasting for 17 years and set up another new TV station. He also wrote several books, prize-winning short stories, and plays. His poem Navigating the Migration won the Kansas State Poetry Contest, and his play, The Deals are Going Down, had a successful run in Los Angeles. His last novel, Cool Hand in a Hot Fire, was published in 2004.

He died at his home in Spearfish, South Dakota in May 2014 at the age of 77, from pneumonia.
