= T.C. Atlantic =

1960s American psychedelic/garage rock band

Background information
- Origin: Minneapolis, Minnesota, United States
- Genres: Garage rock; psychedelic rock
- Years active: 1965-1968
- Labels: Aesop's, B-Sharp, Turtle, Candy Floss, Parrot
- Past members: Freddy Freeman; Bob Wells; Joe Kanan; Rod Eaton

T.C. Atlantic was an American garage rock/psychedelic rock band from Minneapolis, Minnesota who were active in the 1960s. They were one of the most popular groups in the Twin Cities, but failed to break nationally. In the intervening years since their breakup, their recordings have attracted the interest of '60s music collectors and enthusiasts, and they are particularly remembered for their 1966 fuzz-tinged song, "Faces", which has been mentioned as one of the earliest garage rock songs to display psychedelic characteristics.

== History ==
The group hailed from Minneapolis, Minnesota, and in the mid to late 1960s, they were one of the biggest groups in the Minneapolis area, recording a six singles and a live LP that were little heard outside of the region. The band's lineup consisted of Freddy Freeman on vocals and keyboards, Bob Wells on guitar, Joe Kanan on bass, and Rod Eaton on drums.

Their first single, "I Love You So Little Girl" was released in 1965 on Aesop's Records. In March 1966 they followed it up with "Mona" b/w "My Babe." Their third record was released in June on Turtle Records and featured the trance-like and psychedelic A-side "Faces," backed with "Baby Please Don't Go." Faces, which featured the sound of a fuzz-toned organ and eastern scales, has been mentioned as one of the earliest garage rock songs to display psychedelic characteristics. In November they cut another record of Turtle, "Shake" b/w "Spanish Harlem." In 1967 the band recorded a live LP for Dove Records, Live at the Bel Rae Ballroom, though consisting of all cover songs, is today highly regarded. In early 1968 they cut a single Candy Floss Records, "I'm So Glad" b/w "20 Years Ago (In Speedy's Kitchen). Their last record came out in May of that year on Parrot Records, "Love is Just" b/w "Faces." The band broke up shortly thereafter.

In the intervening years their work has come to the attention of garage rock and psychedelic music collectors and enthusiasts. The song "Faces," is particularly revered and is sometimes mentioned as one of the finest garage psychedelic songs. It has been included on the Pebbles, Volume 3 compilation. An anthology of the band's work has been assembled by Bacchus Archives, The Best of T.C. Atlantic. Their live album, Recorded Live at the Bel Rae Ballroom, has been re-issued on Eva Records out of France.

== Members ==
- Freddy Freeman (vocals and keyboards)
- Bob Wells (guitar)
- Joe Kanan (bass)
- Rod Eaton (drums)

== Discography ==
=== Singles ===
- "I Love You So Little Girl" b/w "Once Upon a Melody" (Aesop's 5-6044, September 1965)
- "Mona" b/w "My Babe" (B-Sharp 272, March 1966)
- "Faces" b/w "Baby Please Don't Go" (Turtle 1103, June 1966)
- "Shake" b/w "Spanish Harlem" (Turtle 1105, November 1966)
- "I'm So Glad" b/w "20 Years Ago (In Speedy's Kitchen)" (Candy Floss 101, March 1968)
- "Love is Just" b/w "Faces" (Parrot 338, May 1968)

=== Album ===
- Recorded Live at the Bel Rae Ballroom (Dove, 1967)
