= The Little Boy Blues =

American garage rock band

- Origin: Chicago, Illinois, United States
- Genres: Garage rock, rock and roll, protopunk, psychedelic rock
- Years active: 1964-1969
- Labels: IRC, Ronco, Fontana
- Past members: Lowell Shyette; Paul Ostroff; Ray Levin; James Boyce; Billy McColl; Frank Biner; Peter Pollok; Marc Coplon; Bill Mooney

The Little Boy Blues were an American garage rock band from Chicago, Illinois, active in the mid- to late 1960s, who are considered early pioneers in protopunk. They are best known for songs such as "The Great Train Robbery" and their version of Van Morrison's "I Can Only Give You Everything", both of which are considered garage classics. Throughout their tenure, they underwent several personnel changes and in the late 1960s began to evolve their sound into a more sophisticated direction, before disbanding in 1969.

== History ==
The Little Boy Blues formed in 1964. Their original lineup consisted of singer/guitarist Lowell Shyette, lead guitarist Paul Ostroff, bassist Ray Levin, and drummer James Boyce—all students at the University of Illinois at Chicago. Initially, their repertoire consisted primarily of Chicago blues and early rock & roll standards.

The group signed with the local IRC label, but agreed to modify their blues-based sound, in favor of a more commercial Beatles-inspired approach. Later in 1965, they issued the single "Love for a Day," which became a major hit on Chicago radio and would earn the band opening gigs for acts such as The Rolling Stones, The Lovin' Spoonful, and The Association. A second vocalist, Billy McColl was occasionally brought in for live dates, and appeared on their second single, Willie Dixon's "I'm Ready", which marked a return to a more blues-based approach. It was another local hit.

Their next single, the fuzz-drenched "I Can Only Give You Everything," became a local hit and is now regarded as a 1960s garage classic. They gained a weekly residence at the popular nightclub, the Like Young. After an appearance on Dick Clark's television series, Where the Action Is, and with the local success of "I Can Only give You Everything," the Little Boy Blues appeared to be on the cusp of national fame.

But, in September 1966 lead singer and guitarist, Lowell Shyette, was drafted into Army duty, putting a spoke into the wheels of the band's momentum. Frank Biner was tapped to be Shyette's replacement. In 1967, the band left IRC for the Ronko label and issued their fourth single, "The Great Train Robbery," which, like the one before is considered a 1960s punk classic. As psychedelia grew in popularly, the group began to move into a more diverse musical direction, playing at local "be-ins" and headlining at Chicago psychedelic clubs such as the Cheetah and the Electric Playground.

The change in musical direction did not sit well with McColl or Ostroff, both of whom left the band. Guitarist Peter Pollok was hired as a replacement. Around this time, the band signed to a record deal with the Fontana label of Mercury Records, with plans to record a full album of material. But midway through recording both frank Biner and James Boyce quit over creative differences. Marc Coplon on vocals and Bill Mooney on drums were hastily recruited to complete the album, In the Woodland of Weir, which has been criticized for being patchy in quality. The Little Boy Blues continued for about a year before disbanding in 1969.

The group's song "Seed of Love", on the album In the Woodland of Weir (Fontana, 1968) was sampled for the song "Public Service Announcement (Interlude)", produced by Just Blaze on the Grammy-nominated Jay-Z album The Black Album. The Jay-Z song was featured on the soundtrack of the popular video game NBA 2K13.

== Discography ==
=== Singles ===
- "Look at the Sun" b/w "Love for a Day" (IRC, 1965)
- "I'm Ready" (W. Dixon) b/w "Little Boy Blues Blues" (IRC, 1966)
- "I Can Only Give You Everything" (T. Scott) b/w "You Don't Love Me" (E. McDaniel) (IRC, 1966)
- "Great Train Robbery" (J. Miller) b/w "Season of the Witch" (D. Leitch) (Ronko, 1967)
- "It's Only You" b/w "Is Love?" (Fontana, 1968)

=== Studio albums ===
- In the Woodland of Weir (Fontana, 1968)
