= Yesterday's Children =

American psychedelic rock band (1966–1970)

- Origin: Cheshire-Prospect, Connecticut, United States
- Genres: Psychedelic rock; hard rock; acid rock; proto-metal; garage rock
- Years active: 1966–1970
- Label: Parrot
- Past members: Dennis Croce; Richard Croce; Reggie Wright; Ralph Muscatelli; Chuck Maher

Yesterday's Children was an American psychedelic rock band formed in Cheshire-Prospect, Connecticut, outside of New Haven, in 1966. The group's earliest release was "To Be or Not to Be", in 1967. Initially a garage band, they transitioned into a psychedelic proto-heavy metal outfit. They released a self-titled album, which became a cult classic, in 1970, before disbanding that same year.

== Trajectory ==
Formed in 1966, Yesterday's Children featured brothers Dennis (lead vocals) and Richard Croce (rhythm guitar, vocals), along with Reggie Wright (lead guitar), Ralph Muscatelli (drums), and Chuck Maher (bass). The band played aggressive garage rock, while incorporating aspects of psychedelic nuance into their compositions. Later in the year, the group released their debut single, "To Be or Not to Be", on the London Records subsidiary label, Parrot Records, and became a regional success. It is also one of the rarest and sought after releases by avid record collectors. Over the following three years, Yesterday's Children released two more singles.

In 1970, the band recorded their only album, Yesterday's Children, which was released on Map City Records. It exemplified the group's development of a psychedelic proto-heavy metal sound, among the earliest of its kind. The album is marked by Richard Croce's high-pitch screeching wails that prefigured those of AC/DC vocalist Bon Scott, and the fuzz-toned double guitar instrumentals played by Wright and Muscatelli. Despite its innovative qualities, the album was perhaps released too early to be commercially accessible and failed to chart nationally. The group disbanded soon thereafter.

Reinterest in Yesterday's Children resulted in some tracks appearing on the History of Garage Bands in Connecticut compilation album in 1995. In 2004, Akarma Records released a remastered version of Yesterday's Children, resulting in more recognition for the band's psychedelic hard rock music. Music critic Dean McFarlane described the reissue as a "stunning object to behold and an audiophile remaster of this underground classic". Another reflection of the album on the Sputnikmusic website boasts it is a "forgotten gem" and "Vanilla Fudge, Cream and the MC5 are often considered as three of the major influences on the future development of hard rock and metal. This obscure little band from Connecticut show, however, that these glory boys weren't the only ones trying to build upon their blues and psychedelic influences and attempt to deliver something distinctly harder edged".

== Band members ==
- Dennis Croce (lead vocals)
- Richard Croce (rhythm guitar, vocals)
- Reggie Wright (lead guitar)
- Chuck Maher (bass guitar)
- Ralph Muscatelli (drums)

== Discography ==
- "To Be or Not to Be" b/w "Baby I Want You" (Parrot 314, January 1967)
- Yesterday's Children (Map City, August 1970)
1. "Paranoia"
2. "Sad Born Loser"
3. "What of I"
4. "She's Easy"
5. "Sailing"
6. "Providence Bummer"
7. "Evil Woman"
8. "Hunter's Moon"
