= Pebbles (series) =

Compilation album by Various Artists
- Released: 1978–2007
- Recorded: 1965–1968
- Genre: Psychedelic rock; garage rock; freakbeat
- Label: AIP; Mastercharge; BFD; ESD

Professional ratings
Review scores
Source	Rating
AllMusic	4.5/5 stars

Pebbles is an extensive series of compilation albums in both LP and CD formats that have been issued on several record labels, though mostly by AIP. Together with the companion Highs in the Mid-Sixties series, the Pebbles series made available over 800 obscure, mostly American "Original Punk Rock" songs recorded in the mid-1960s — primarily known today as the garage rock and psychedelic rock genres — that were previously known only to a handful of collectors. In 2007, the release of the Pebbles, Volume 11: Northern California CD marked the final album in the Pebbles series (Vol. 12 had been issued in 1999). The following year, Bomp! marked the 30th anniversary of the original Pebbles album with a spartan, limited-edition, clear-vinyl reissue complete with the original pink cover insert.

The Pebbles series played a significant role in the emergence of a "canon" of garage-rock music and artists in the late 1970s and early 1980s.

In his review of the Pebbles series for AllMusic, Richie Unterberger comments: "Though 1972's Nuggets compilation reawakened listeners to the sounds of mid-'60s garage rock, it only focused on the tip of the iceberg. Behind those forgotten hits and semi-hits lurked hundreds, if not thousands, of regional hits and flops from the same era, most even rawer and cruder ... More than any other factor, these compilations [in the Pebbles series] were responsible for the resurgence of interest in garage rock, which remains high among collectors to this day."

Including the Highs in the Mid-Sixties series, Best of Pebbles series, Essential Pebbles series, Planetary Pebbles series, and two box sets, more than 60 compilation albums have been released using the Pebbles name. Following on the heels of the success of the Pebbles series, dozens of other series of garage rock compilation albums have been started, with numerous albums being released each year for several decades.

== Pebbles compared with Nuggets ==
The name "Pebbles" is a derivative of the name of the seminal Nuggets album of similar music, since in almost all cases the recordings compiled on these albums were lesser known regional hits or releases with little or no national exposure. By contrast, several of the bands presented on the original Nuggets compilation had one or more national hit songs, such as the Seeds, Blues Magoos, Electric Prunes, the Standells, Count Five and others. As additional albums were released under both of these names over the years, Nuggets albums tended to feature more familiar bands, while Pebbles albums usually unearthed virtually unknown recording artists or previously unreleased tracks by better known bands. As the Pebbles albums were compiled from record collections, dubbed from discs (not from the master tapes like the Nuggets series), often without the knowledge of the musicians or producers involved, BFD and AIP had a much larger range of music to choose from.

In addition, while the original Nuggets album from 1972 bore the subtitle "Original Artyfacts from the First Psychedelic Era, 1965–1969", the Pebbles series made a different claim through its subtitle: "Original Artyfacts from the First Punk Era". In this way Pebbles explicitly sought to connect the garage style of the 1960s to the then-current (1979) punk movement typified by artists like the Ramones, the Sex Pistols, and others.

== Nature of the music ==
The Pebbles series describes the recordings on their albums as "Original punk rock from the psychedelic 60s!" These recordings were primarily made by the numerous American bands that were formed in the wake of the British Invasion. Essentially referring to the young age and lack of sophistication of the musicians, the term "punk rock" was coined (or at least popularized) by Lenny Kaye, who was involved in compiling the original Nuggets: Original Artyfacts from the First Psychedelic Era, 1965-1968. Some of the recordings of this type were credited to individual musicians, but most were made by young combos and rock bands that were typically composed of teenagers; the term "garage rock" comes from such an archetypal combo's usual rehearsal space: the suburban American family garage. The songs almost invariably come from 45 rpm singles. In many cases, the band would release a routine cover song of a well-known hit as the "A" side of a single and include a more interesting original song as the "B" side that would be more appropriate for inclusion on a compilation album. However, the wild covers by some of the garage rock bands are as renowned as any of the original songs, and numerous cover songs have also been compiled on the Pebbles series.

"Punk rock" is now mainly applied to several waves of bands that formed in the 1970s and later, and many of these bands cite the music on Nuggets and Pebbles albums as major influences. This type of music is now generally identified as the genres of garage rock and psychedelic rock.

== Mastercharge Records ==
The original release of the first Pebbles album was on the Mastercharge label in 1978 and was circulated primarily among a small group of collectors in Australia, where interest in this obscure music seems to have first germinated. Only 500 albums were pressed, sporting a pink pasted-on cover sheet. "Mastercharge Records" was apparently not a real record company and might have been a reference to the financing of the release by a credit card. ("Master Charge" was the name of the credit card company in the 1970s that is now known as MasterCard). One radio playlist posted on the Internet mentioned a "Pebbles, Volume 2" on Mastercharge Records, but this was probably an incorrect reference to the BFD release.

== BFD Records ==
The first 10 LPs in the Pebbles series, including a reissue of the original volume were credited in the name of BFD Records of Kookaburra, Australia. These albums were released in a span of just two years (1979 and 1980) and are regarded by some as the best volumes in the series.

The legitimacy of BFD Records (and the apparently associated company BFD Productions) has long been in question, not least because Kookaburra is actually the name of a bird of Australia, not a city or town. As an example, the back cover of the BFD pressing of Pebbles, Volume 3 includes the following: "Licensed by special arrangement with Mastercharge Records, Dacron Ohio, USA" (Mastercharge being the label under which the first Pebbles volume was originally issued), followed by "® & © 1979 by BFD Records, Kookaburra, Australia 2157. Unauthorized duplication is a violation of applicable laws. All rights reserved." The first licensing notation is clearly fictitious (possibly inspired by the location of the National Lampoon's High School Yearbook parody) – Dacron is an artificial fiber, while the city in Ohio is Akron – and the same might easily be true of the second. Also, the Bomp! website says of its AIP label: "Since 1978, this Bomp-affiliated label has been assembling compilations of punk, psych, beat, garage, and related obscurities." Actually, the first AIP album was the Pebbles, Volume 11 LP, which was released in 1983. Thus, Bomp! seems to be taking tacit responsibility for the entire series.

In any case, whether or not it is a charade, the BFD label has been perpetuated throughout the releases on the Pebbles series. The reissues of the first 10 volumes have no reference to Bomp! or AIP, and the first 10 CDs in the Pebbles series include the same "BFD" catalogue numbers—which are not all consecutively numbered—as the corresponding LPs. Copyright notices referring to BFD continued to be exhibited on almost all of the albums in the Pebbles series well into the 2000s, including both the ESD CD's and the AIP CDs. Also, there are subtle differences in the packaging and programming of the BFD releases as compared to the later releases on AIP. Although the albums in the Pebbles series were produced in such small numbers that tracking down anyone regarding royalties might have been next to impossible, neither Bomp! nor anyone else has evidently been sued for copyright infringement with regard to these releases. Finally, these same charges have been made about other reissue record companies over the years as well, such as Collectables.

== AIP Records ==
Beginning in 1983, Bomp! created the AIP record label in part to issue further volumes in the Pebbles series. In addition to the 10 volumes on the BFD label that were reissued several times over the years, another 18 LPs and 12 CDs have been issued in the Pebbles series under their auspices. Many of the LPs and CDs have basically the same catalogue numbers, and there is significant overlap in the tracks on the first 6 volumes on LP and CD—with the CD release of Volume 6 being shifted to the English Freakbeat series—adding to the confusion. However, the overlap is far from complete; Pebbles, Volume 5 is the sole CD that has all of the songs from the corresponding LP, and only about half of the surf rock tracks from the Pebbles, Volume 4 LP were released on that CD.

When AIP renewed the Pebbles series in 1983, the company was apparently more interested in documenting local music scenes than in scattershot groupings of American garage rock records, so the Highs in the Mid-Sixties series was begun concurrently, with a total of 23 volumes devoted to recordings from specific American cities, states and regions, as compared to the 18 volumes of AIP Pebbles LPs. What's more, 10 of the 18 LPs that AIP issued in the Pebbles series were compilations of recordings from continental Europe in the sub-series The Continent Lashes Back.

According to the Bomp! website, the release of the Pebbles, Volume 11 CD in 2007—actually several years after the release of the Pebbles, Volume 12 CD—represents the last album that will ever be issued in the Pebbles series. More recently, AIP has begun the Essential Pebbles series and Planetary Pebbles series; whether there will be future volumes in these series is uncertain.

To their credit, when AIP began issuing Pebbles albums on CD, the albums included numerous recordings that were not as yet on the LPs. Also, after the release of the first six volumes on CD, all of the tracks on the Pebbles CDs had been previously un-reissued on CD. Even the first two releases in the Essential Pebbles series include a second CD of previously un-reissued music in addition to the distillation from the previous Pebbles albums.

== ESD Records ==
According to the AIP website, ESD Records (also known as East Side Digital) issued 4 volumes of CDs in the Pebbles series in 1989–1990. Though compiled by AIP, the tracks are almost completely different from those in the corresponding volumes of the LPs and CDs described previously (although a sizable number of the tracks on ESD's Pebbles, Volume 2 appear on both the earlier Pebbles, Volume 3 LP and the later CD reissue). Particularly on ESD's Pebbles, Volume 1, many of the tracks are either new to Pebbles or are buried on the higher-numbered volumes in the Pebbles series or Highs in the Mid-Sixties series. The albums had a limited run of only 1,000 each and are now difficult to locate; but, not surprisingly, the ESD and AIP CDs are often confused. One added bonus in the ESD CDs is that the excellent liner notes are written by Nigel Strange (who wrote liner notes for several of the BFD Records albums also).

== Discography ==
=== LPs ===
- Pebbles, Volume 1; #BFD-5016 — (no volume number on the BFD Records LP release; no catalogue number on the initial Mastercharge release)
- Pebbles, Volume 2; #BFD-5019
- Pebbles, Volume 3: The Acid Gallery; #BFD-5020
- Pebbles, Volume 4: Summer Means Fun; #BFD-5021
- Pebbles, Volume 5; #BFD-5022
- Pebbles, Volume 6: The Roots of Mod; #BFD-5023
- Pebbles, Volume 7; #BFD-5024
- Pebbles, Volume 8; #BFD-5025
- Pebbles, Volume 9; #BFD-5026
- Pebbles, Volume 10; #BFD-5027
- Pebbles, Volume 11; #AIP 10001
- Pebbles, Volume 12; #AIP 10002
- Pebbles, Volume 13; #AIP 10013
- Pebbles, Volume 14; #AIP 10016
- Pebbles, Volume 15: The Continent Lashes Back! The Netherlands 1965–1968; #AIP 10018
- Pebbles, Volume 16; #AIP 10023
- Pebbles, Volume 17; #AIP 10032
- Pebbles, Volume 18: The Continent Lashes Back! European Garage Rock Part 2; #AIP 10033
- Pebbles, Volume 19: The Continent Lashes Back! European Garage, Beat, & Psych Rarities Pt 3: Denmark; #AIP 10034
- Pebbles, Volume 20: The Continent Lashes Back! European Garage Rock Part 4: Sweden; #AIP 10035
- Pebbles, Volume 21; #AIP 10036
- Pebbles, Volume 22; #AIP 10037
- Pebbles, Volume 23: The Continent Lashes Back! European Garage, Beat, & Psych Rarities: Holland, Pt. 2; #AIP 10040
- Pebbles, Volume 24: The Continent Lashes Back! European Garage, Beat, & Psych Rarities: Germany; #AIP 10043
- Pebbles, Volume 25: The Continent Lashes Back! European Garage, Beat, & Psych Rarities: Holland Pt. 3; #AIP 10042
- Pebbles, Volume 26: The Continent Lashes Back! European Garage, Beat, & Psych Rarities: Sweden Pt 2; #AIP 10044
- Pebbles, Volume 27: The Continent Lashes Back! European Garage, Beat, & Psych Rarities: Switzerland; #AIP 10045
- Pebbles, Volume 28: The Continent Lashes Back! European Garage, Beat, & Psych Rarities: Sweden Pt 3; #AIP 10046

=== CDs — AIP Records ===
- Pebbles, Volume 1; #AIP-CD-5016
- Pebbles, Volume 2; #AIP-CD-5019
- Pebbles, Volume 3: The Acid Gallery; #AIP-CD-5020
- Pebbles, Volume 4: Surf N Tunes; #AIP-CD-5021
- Pebbles, Volume 5; #AIP-CD-5022
- Pebbles, Volume 6: Chicago 1; #AIP-CD-5023
- Pebbles, Volume 7: Chicago 2; #AIP-CD-5024
- Pebbles, Volume 8: Southern California 1; #AIP-CD-5025
- Pebbles, Volume 9: Southern California 2; #AIP-CD-5026
- Pebbles, Volume 10; #AIP-CD-5027
- Pebbles, Volume 11: Northern California; #AIP-CD-5028
- Pebbles, Volume 12: The World; #AIP-CD-5029

=== CDs — ESD Records ===
- Pebbles, Volume 1; #ESD 80252
- Pebbles, Volume 2; #ESD 80262
- Pebbles, Volume 3; #ESD 80362
- Pebbles, Volume 4; #ESD 80372

=== Box Sets ===
- Pebbles box
- Trash Box

== See also ==
- Highs in the Mid-Sixties series
- Psychedelic States
