= AIP Records =

Record label

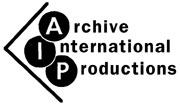
- Parent company: Bomp! Records
- Founded: 1983
- Founder: Greg Shaw
- Distributor(s): Bomp! Records
- Genre: Garage rock, psychedelic rock, rock and roll
- Country of origin: U.S.

AIP Records is a record label that was started by Greg Shaw's Bomp! Records in 1983 to continue the Pebbles series. AIP stands for "Archive International Productions". The first 10 volumes in the Pebbles series had been released in 1979–1980 by BFD Records of Kookaburra, Australia (most likely a fictitious label name and location to avoid copyright infringement lawsuits, with kookaburra being the name of an Australian bird), and have been kept in print by AIP for many years. Including those in the companion Highs in the Mid-Sixties series – which concentrated on American regional music scenes – there are over 50 LPs covering some 800 obscure, mostly American "Original Punk Rock" songs recorded in the mid-1960s – primarily known today as the garage rock and psychedelic rock genres – that were previously known only to a handful of collectors.

Two similar series of LPs featuring British music were released in the ensuing years, the English Freakbeat series and Electric Sugar Cube Flashbacks series. Although LPs are still available from the Bomp! Records website, none are being manufactured any longer; and many are now out of print, including all of the Freakbeat and Flashbacks discs.

AIP Records also issued numerous CDs in the English Freakbeat series and Pebbles series, with the first 6 Pebbles volumes being basically the same as the LPs, with bonus tracks. The 6th Pebbles album was reissued more appropriately as the 6th CD in the English Freakbeat series, since this LP also featured British music. Most of the later Pebbles CDs were taken from particular regions, like the Highs series. In 2007, AIP Records released the Pebbles, Volume 11 CD as the last of the albums in this landmark series.

AIP Records has begun the Essential Pebbles series, the Planetary Pebbles series, and the You Gotta Have Moxie series. With the exception of an album called New Fruit by Sky Saxon, former leader of the Seeds, all of the AIP releases are in one of these series.

== See also ==
- List of record labels
