= Green Crystal Ties, Volume 9: The Great Lost Psychedelic Garage Bands =

Compilation album
- Released: April 7, 1998
- Recorded: 1960s
- Genre: Acid rock; garage rock; Psychedelic rock
- Length: 46:09
- Label: Collectables

chronology
Green Crystal Ties, Volume 8: Stomping Garage Band Legends (1998)	Green Crystal Ties, Volume 9: The Great Lost Psychedelic Garage Bands (1998)	Green Crystal Ties, Volume 10: 60s Garage Band Flashback (1998)

Green Crystal Ties, Volume 9: The Great Lost Psychedelic Garage Bands is a compilation album featuring obscure American psychedelic rock musical artists that recorded in the 1960s. It is the ninth installment of the Green Crystal Ties series and was released on Collectables Records on April 7, 1998. The album is considered one of the series best showings of psychedelic music.

Opening the album is two tracks by the psychedelic pop band the Lemon Drops, including their regional hit, the fuzz-toned "I Live in the Springtime". Offerings from the Los Angeles group the Human Expression include "Readin' Your Will," a statement against illegal drug use, and the more somber "Everynight". A frenzied interpretation of the Yardbirds' "For Your Love", recorded by the Kreegs, is considered among the superior versions of the song released. Other musical highlights include two psychedelic-tinged numbers by the Morning Dew, who incorporate classical instruments into their arrangements. In addition, "Pink Either" and "Psychedelic Moon" by session band the Deep are of some historical value for being among the songs featured on Psychedelic Moods, a hazy set-piece that is arguably the first entirely psychedelic concept album. Two tracks by the Lemon Fog are characterized by melodic harmonies and heavy McCartney-esque basslines.

The album is also praised for its thorough liner notes, revealing information about the bands' previously uniformed histories.

== Track listing ==
1. The Lemon Drops: "It Happens Everyday"
2. The Lemon Drops: "I Live in the Springtime"
3. The Nuchez: "Open Up Your Mind"
4. The Human Expression: "Readin' Your Will"
5. The Human Expression: "Everynight"
6. The Kreeg: "For Your Love"
7. The Kreeg: "I'm Over You"
8. The Morning Dew: "Sycamore Dreamer"
9. The Morning Dew: "Our Last Song"
10. The Outcasts: "Walk on By"
11. The Penthouse 5: "It's All My Own Bizarre Dream"
12. The Deep: "Pink Ether "
13. The Deep: "Psychedelic Moon"
14. The Pagens: "Mystic Cloud"
15. The Lemon Fog: "Summer"
16. The Lemon Fog: "The Living Eye Theme"
17. Smokin' Bananas: "Will You Love Me Tomorrow"
18. Smokin' Bananas: "Wait! Wait!"
