= Green Crystal Ties, Volume 1: Garage Band Rebels =

Compilation album
- Released: April 7, 1998
- Recorded: 1960s
- Genre: Psychedelic rock; garage rock
- Length: 56:43
- Label: Collectables

chronology
| Green Crystal Ties, Volume 1: Garage Band Rebels (1998) | Green Crystal Ties, Volume 2: Best of the 60s Garage Band Scene (1998) |

Green Crystal Ties, Volume 1: Garage Band Rebels is the first installment in the Green Crystal Ties series of psychedelic and garage rock compilations issued by Collectables Records. It was released on April 7, 1998 and focuses on bands from Texas who were active in the 1960s and early 1970s such as the Zakary Thaks, The Bad Seeds, the Liberty Bell from Corpus Christi. Like all of the entries in the series, the highly colorful packaging is designed by Nicole Ruhl Fichera and on this occasion features a photograph of the Zakary Thaks on front. The inner sleeve includes through liner notes written by Steve Kaplan and Matt Wendelken which provide helpful biographical information about the bands and their songs.

The set begins with two songs by the Bad Seeds: "More of the Same," which is followed by their take on Slim Harpo's "I'm a King Bee," previously covered by the Rolling Stones on their self-titled debut. The Illusions do a seething rendition of Van Morrison's "Gloria," originally performed by his band Them, which here is punctuated by angry sounding guitars, pulsating bass, and a defiant vocal. The Illusions respond in a different vein with "Try," which includes the presence of block harmonies. The Outlaws do a Byrds-influenced number, "Worlds Apart." The Liberty Bell follow in kind with the folk-influenced "Something for Me" but then switch gears with the fuzz-drenched psychedelia of "Reality Is the Only Answer," written by Chris Gerniottis, previously of the Zakary Thaks, who also appear on tis set. The Nomads from Houston recorded a version of the Burt Bacarach and Hal David song, "My Little Red Book," which is included here and had supplied Love an early minor hit, which is then followed by the strident protopunk of their own composition, "Situations." Reflecting the progression of time into the early 1970s are the inclusion of two tracks, "Revolution II" and "Help Yourself" by Chris Gerniottis' later band Kubla Kahn, which despite their greater sophistication still manage to retain some redolence of 60s punk. The set closes out with the Zakary Thaks' thumping adrenalin-laced protopunk of "My Door," and "Green Crystal Ties," the latter of which provides the whole series with its name.

== Track listing ==
1. The Bad Seeds: "A Taste of the Same" (Mike Taylor) 2:44
2. The Bad Seeds: "I'm a King Bee" (James Moore) 1:49
3. The Zakary Thaks: "Won't Come Back" (Chris Gerniottis) 2:37
4. The Zakary Thaks: "Face to Face" (Chris Gerniottis) 2:58
5. The Illusions: "Gloria" 2:24
6. The Illusions: "Try" 2:19
7. The Outlaws: "Fun, Fame, and Fortune" 2:11
8. The Outlaws: "Worlds Apart" 2:17
9. The Liberty Bell: "Something for Me" (Al Hunt) 2:41
10. The Liberty Bell: "Reality Is the Only Answer" (Chris Gerniottis) 2:10
11. The Nomads: "My Little Red Book" (Burt Bacharach/Hal David) 2:00
12. The Nomads: "Situations" (Frank Zigal) 2:42
13. Michael: "People See" 2:57
14. Michael: "My Last Day" 1:55
15. Kubla Kahn: "Revolution II" (Chris Gerniottis) 4:34
16. Kubla Kahn: "Help Yourself" (Chris Gerniottis) 3:29
17. The Zakary Thaks: "My Door" 3:42
18. The Zakary Thaks "Green Crystal Ties" 11:14

== Cataloging information ==
1. CD (Collectables COL 0721, 1998)
