= Milan the Leather Boy =

American musician (1941–1971)

- Also known as: Milan; The World of Milan; Milan (The Leather Boy); The Leather Boy
- Born: Milan Radenković; December 15, 1941
- Died: March 14, 1971 (aged 29)
- Genres: Pop music Rock and roll Garage rock Psychedelic rock
- Occupations: Recording artist Songwriter; Producer
- Instruments: Guitar; Vocals
- Years active: 1963-1969

Milan Radenkovich (December 15, 1941 – March 14, 1971), who was always credited mononymously as Milan, was an American record producer, songwriter and recording artist on numerous songs made throughout the 1960s, mostly though not exclusively in the garage rock genre. He released an LP and numerous singles for seven different national record labels and other independent labels (a total of more than 30 songs) under a variety of names, including Milan with His Orchestra, Milan, The World of Milan, Milan (The Leather Boy), and The Leather Boy, and also worked under the name Rick Rodell. As a producer, arranger and/or songwriter, Milan oversaw many other releases by a variety of artists ranging from the pop singer Lou Christie to the psychedelic rock band the Head Shop.

Greg Shaw placed Milan's song "I'm a Leather Boy" as the opening track on two different albums in the Pebbles series: the Pebbles, Volume 10 CD and the earlier Pebbles, Volume 11 LP (which was also the first album to be released on his AIP record label). He has written of Milan as being "a cryptic artist who made a series of high image records offering himself as some leather-clad, bike-riding rebel, but so stylized he might've been imagined by Andy Warhol. . . . The only name to be found on these records is Milan, a name that also shows up as writer/producer on a big pile of records, from the early 60s right thru the end of the decade. . . . But who was he? No further clue has ever emerged. This is one guy whose story really cries out to be told."

In the promotional material for the 2009 retrospective album Hell Bent for Leather, Milan was described in this way: "From his earliest incarnation in the record industry as a Xmas twister, the enigmatic Milan has changed his name and re-invented himself several times: a teen idol with a cute hairdo and a preppy look, a garage gonzo savage, an all dressed-in-black biker stud, a psychedelic screamer in love with satellite sounds, and other characters known or waiting to be discovered. One thing is for sure: Few people can claim so many identities in less than a decade."

== Identity and background ==
Milan was born Milan Radenković, anglicized as Milan Radenkovich, though the surname is rarely if ever shown on records attributed to him. However, he changed his name to Richard (Rick) Rodell while he was still in high school in Florida, and was often known by that name in the recording industry. Milan's father performed as Rasha (or Rascha) Rodell, and was a folk singer and guitarist who performed in the late 1950s at the Eden Roc Hotel in Miami Beach, Florida. Milan's older brother, Petar Radenković, is a former Yugoslavian-Serbian goalkeeper with the football (soccer) team, TSV 1860 München of Munich, who won the German Bundesliga title in 1966 and the German Cup in 1964.

== Album, I Am What I Am ==
Album Cover

After a couple of early singles, Milan released an LP on 20th Century Fox in 1964, named I Am What I Am, along with two associated singles, "I Am What I Am" b/w "Over and Over Again" and later "Runnin' Wild" b/w "Angel's Lullaby". The front cover (pictured) also includes "presenting a bright new star". The album's liner notes describe Milan as "a darkly handsome, six foot, 160 lb. twenty year old" with a "European musical background" and continue: "Milan is popular music . . . he lives it, loves it and understands it and refuses to allow the tendency to copy whatever happens to be in the top ten at the present time to influence his work".

The album is in the style of early 1960s orchestral pop music records, instead of the garage rock and psychedelic rock recordings for which he is better known. However, some of the songs on the album, including "Runnin' Wild" and "Spellbound" have the flavor of his later garage-rock classics.

== Producer, arranger and songwriting credits ==

For the most part, the name "Milan" was used in his many appearances on disc as songwriter, arranger or producer; but there are many exceptions. On his first single, the songwriter of "Santa's Doin' the Twist" and "Swing a Little Harder" is given as "Rick Rodell". On his 1964 album, the songwriter is listed as "M. Rodell", and on the first of the two associated singles, the songwriter is "Milan Rodelle" (with the surname misspelled in that case). "M. Rodell" is also listed as the songwriter and arranger on the Licorice Schtik song "The Kissin' Game".

He also was the producer for both sides of a 1967 single "Bongo Bongo" b/w "Free as a Bird" on MGM – MGM also released some of his own singles – for an obscure girl group called The Chanters. He was also listed as the songwriter of "Bongo Bongo". According to the programmer of the compilation albums Look What I Found, Volume 12 and Look What I Found, Volume 21 – which each included a re-release of one side of this single – "'Bongo Bongo' sounds like [Milan's] 'On the Go'. . . The Chanters have remained a mystery band as I've never seen this 45 on any compilation." A song by the Downtown Collection called "Washington Square" was included on Volume 42 of the same series; Milan was the producer on this record.

In a foray into yet another style of music, Milan wrote and arranged both sides of a single on Capitol for a bubblegum pop band called Ice Cream that was released in 1968.

== Reissues and other sources ==

In 1983, Milan was re-introduced to the world in Pebbles, Volume 11 of the LPs in the Pebbles series. This was actually the first album in the series to be officially released by Bomp! and was the initial LP on their AIP label. This particular compilation album starts off with both sides of a 1967 single by The Leather Boy, "I'm a Leather Boy" and "Shadows", while "You Gotta Have Soul" closes the album. The former cut is an exuberant garage rock track that features actual sounds of motorcycles in the background that even Steppenwolf eschewed, while the latter is a passionate romp that has a similar gritty feel. "Shadows" – a thoughtful meditation on the remains of a failed romance – is a marvelous psychedelic rock masterwork that appears on the Pebbles box sets called Pebbles Box and Trash Box but is not otherwise available in the Pebbles series on CD. However, "On the Go" appears on the Pebbles, Volume 10 CD (this song also reprises the motorcycle sounds from "I'm a Leather Boy").

Greg Shaw expressed hope that an album could be collected of his work some day — which finally occurred in 2009 when Hell Bent for Leather was released — adding that "what he did with Donovan songs has to be heard to be believed!". The latter is a reference to the Leather Boy cover of Donovan's song "Jersey Thursday" on one of the rarest of Milan's singles.

While not reaching the stratospheric level of artists like the Human Expression and the Outcasts (from Texas), the original Milan 45s sell on a regular basis for elevated prices. For instance, between 2004 and 2006, the "I'm a Leather Boy" single sold at auction on eBay for $68, £15 and £27.

== Death ==
Milan died on March 14, 1971, aged 29, in New York, possibly from brain cancer.

== Discography ==
=== Singles ===
==== As a recording artist ====
As Milan with His Orchestra:

- "Santa's Doin' the Twist" b/w "Swing a Little Longer"; Migon (#1962-A/B) – 1962

As Milan:

- "Innocence" b/w "Winter Time"; End (#1123) – 1963
- "I Am What I Am" b/w "Over and Over Again"; 20th Century Fox (#487) – 1964
- "Runnin' Wild" b/w "Angel's Lullaby"; 20th Century Fox (#552) – 1964

As The World of Milan:

- "Cry, Lonely Boy" b/w "Luva-Luva"; ABC-Paramount (#10718) – 1965
- "Follow the Sun" b/w "I'm Cryin' in the Rain"; Brunswick (#55292) – 1966
- "One Track Mind" b/w "Shades of Blue"; Brunswick (#55298) – 1966

As Milan (The Leather Boy):

- "You Gotta Have Soul" b/w "My Prayer"; Flower (#100) – 1967

As The Leather Boy:

- "I'm a Leather Boy" b/w "Shadows"; MGM (#K-13724) – April 1967
- "On the Go" b/w "Soulin'"; MGM (#K-13790) – August 1967
- "Jersey Thursday" b/w "Black Friday"; Parkway (#125) – 1967

==== As a producer, arranger and/or songwriter ====
Lou Christie:

- "How Many Teardrops" b/w "You and I (Have a Right to Cry)"; Roulette #R-4504 – 1963

The American Beetles:

- "Don't Be Unkind" b/w "You Did It To Me"; Roulette (#4550) – 1964

The Chanters:

- "Bongo Bongo" b/w "Free as a Bird"; MGM (#K13750) – 1967

The Unclaimed:

- "Memories of Green Eyes" b/w/ "Jingle Jangle"; Philips (#30430) – 1967

The Licorice Schtik:

- "The Kissin' Game" b/w "Flowers Flowers"; Dot (#17131) – 1968

=== Albums ===
==== Studio albums ====
===== As a recording artist =====
- I Am What I Am; 20th Century Fox (#TFM 3149/#TFS 4149) — 1964

===== As a producer, arranger and/or songwriter =====
- The Head Shop; Epic (#BN 26476) – 1969

==== Retrospective album ====
- Hell Bent for Leather; LS (#LS-001LP) – 2009 (vinyl only)

==== Compilation albums ====
I'm a Leather Boy

1. Pebbles, Volume 11 (LP)
2. Pebbles, Volume 10 (CD)
3. Pebbles, Volume 3 (CD – ESD Release)
4. Mayhem and Psychosis, Volume 1 (LP)
5. Mayhem and Psychosis, Volume 1 (CD)

Shadows

1. Pebbles, Volume 11 (LP)
2. Pebbles Box (LP Box Set)
3. Trash Box (CD Box Set)

You Gotta Have Soul

1. Pebbles, Volume 11 (LP)

On the Go

1. Pebbles, Volume 10 (CD)
2. A Journey to Tyme, Volume 5 (LP)
3. Garagelands, Volume 1 (LP)
4. Garagelands, Volume 1 (CD)
5. Wavy Gravy series

Soulin'

1. A Journey to Tyme, Volume 5 (LP)
2. Garagelands, Volume 1 (LP)
3. Garagelands, Volume 1 (CD)

One Track Mind

1. Winning Sides, Volume 2 (LP)
2. Quagmires, Volume 3 (CD)
