= Green Crystal Ties, Volume 6: Rarities from the Psychedelic Vaults =

Green Crystal Ties, Volume 6: Rarities from the Psychedelic Vault

Compilation album
- Released: April 7, 1998
- Recorded: 1960s
- Genres: Psychedelic rock; acid rock
- Length: 1:01:49
- Label: Collectables

chronology
Green Crystal Ties, Volume 5: Gems from the Garage Band Vaults (1998)	Green Crystal Ties, Volume 6: Rarities from the Psychedelic Vault (1998)	Green Crystal Ties, Volume 7: Mind-Expanding Punk of the 60s (1998)

Green Crystal Ties, Volume 6: Rarities from the Psychedelic Vaults is a compilation album featuring obscure psychedelic rock bands that recorded in the 1960s. It is the sixth installment of the Green Crystal Ties series and was released on Collectables Records on April 7, 1998. Though Volume 6 focuses specifically on psychedelia, the album is commended for featuring a wide-diversity of musical styles intertwined in the genre.

The album opens with the Human Expression, a group who missed a breakthrough nationally, but left behind highly regarded material. Those included on Volume 6 are demos of "Optical Sound", an ethereal recollection of an LSD-induced trip, and "Calm Me Down". It shifts to Mamas and the Papas-influenced tracks by the Sunset Love, who receive one of their earliest retrospective mentions with "Run to the Sun" and "Reach Out" on the album. More musical shifts are evident with the ambitious instrumentals by the Frantics, and the hard rock songs by Buzzsaw, which dwarf in comparison to their offshoot group, Watermelon. The most generic examples of psychedelia are "Peace and Love" and "Nirvana" by the Love Flowers, though the liner notes half-mockingly praise the band as rivals to the Monkees. Perhaps the most sophisticated compositions on the album are those of the Morning Dew, which exemplify the progression from basic garage rock to full-blown psychedelia.

Like other albums in the series, Volume 6 is commended for its informative liner notes, especially when considering most of the groups featured never had an opportunity to record a full-length LP.

== Track listing ==
1. The Human Expression - "Optical Sound" (demo)
2. The Human Expression - "Calm Me Down" (demo)
3. Sunset Love: "Run to the Sun"
4. Sunset Love - "Reach Out"
5. The Frantics - "Relax Your Mind"
6. The Frantics - "Just for a While"
7. Seompi - "Summer's Coming on Heavy"
8. Seompi - "Slide Slide"
9. Buzzsaw - "Saturn Is Just a Few Days Away"
10. Buzzsaw - "Death Calls"
11. Watermelon - "Popsicle Girl"
12. Watermelon - "You Got It"
13. The Love Flowers - "Peace and Love"
14. The Love Flowers - "Nirvana"
15. The Arkay IV - "Demotion"
16. The Arkay IV - "Valley of Conneaut" Creek
17. The Morning Dew - "Someday"
18. The Morning Dew - "Flying Above Myself"
