= Green Crystal Ties, Volume 2: Best of the 60s Garage Band Scene =

Green Crystal Ties, Volume 2: The Best of the 60s Garage Band Scene

Compilation album
- Released: April 7, 1998
- Recorded: 1960s
- Genre: Psychedelic rock; garage rock
- Length: 42:57
- Label: Collectables

chronology
Green Crystal Ties, Volume 1: Garage Band Rebels (1998)	Green Crystal Ties, Volume 2: The Best of the 60s Garage Band Scene (1998)	Green Crystal Ties, Volume 3: Gloria Meets 96 Tears (1998)

Green Crystal Ties, Volume 2: The Best of the 60s Garage Band Scene is the second installment in the Green Crystal Ties series of psychedelic and garage rock compilations issued by Collectables Records. It was released on April 7, 1998 and features songs by obscure American musical artists who recorded in the 1960s and early 1970s. Like all of the entries in the series, the highly colorful packaging is designed by Nicole Ruhl Fichera and features a picture of the Basement Wall from Baton Rouge, Louisiana on front. The inner sleeve includes well-researched liner notes written by Steve Kaplan and Matt Wendelken which provide helpful biographical information about the bands and their songs.

The set begins the Basement Wall doing an alternate version of "Never Existed," followed by "You." The New Breed is represented here on two cuts "Woman" and "I'll Come Running." According to the liner notes, they briefly caught the ear of Terry Melcher, who had produced the Byrds. Tim Schmidt, later of the Eagles, was a member of the New Breed in the 1960s and also would play with former Byrd Michael Clark in Poco before joining the Eagles in the late 1970s. King Richard and the Knights were from Albuquerque, New Mexico and can be heard on two cuts here "I Don't Need You" and "How About Now?" Other bands represented on this outing are the Blue Things, the Missing Links, and the Esquires. The set concludes with two songs by Sounds Unlimited, "About You" and "Keep Your Hands Off It."

== Track listing ==
1. The Basement Wall: "Never Existed" (Version No. 2 Reprise) 1:54
2. The Basement Wall: "You" 2:00
3. The New Breed: "Woman" 1:54
4. The New Breed: "I'll Come Running" 3:23
5. The Blue Things: "You Can't Say We Never Tried" 2:15
6. The Blue Things: "Pennies" 2:32
7. The Barracudas "I'll Feel a Whole Lot Better" (Gene Clark) 2:21
8. The Barracudas: "Not Fade Away" (Buddy Holly / Norman Petty) 2:14
9. King Richard & the Knights: "I Don't Need You" (D. Stewart) 1:50
10. King Richard & the Knights: "How About Now?" 2:38
11. The Missing Links: "The Crowded Part of Town" 2:20
12. The Missing Links: "You Make Me Feel Good" (Chris White) 2:30
13. The Esquires: "Judgment Day" 1:57
14. The Esquires: "These Are the Tender Years" 2:46
15. The Penthouse 5: "You're Gonna Make Me" (Jon Williams) 2:38
16. The Penthouse 5: "You're Always Around" 2:39
17. Sounds Unlimited: "About You" 2:51
18. Sounds Unlimited: "Keep Your Hands Off of It" 2:15
