= You Got Yours! East Bay Garage 1965 - 1967 =

You Got Yours! East Bay Garage 1965-1967

Compilation album
- Released: September 18, 2007
- Recorded: 1965–1967
- Genre: Garage rock; folk rock
- Length: 1:00:37
- Label: Big Beat
- Producer: Alec Palao

chronology
It's Bad for You, But Buy It (2004)	You Got Yours! East Bay Garage 1965-1967 (2007)	Sing Me a Rainbow (2008)

You Got Yours! East Bay Garage 1965-1967 is a compilation album featuring American garage rock bands that were active in the San Francisco Bay area between 1965 and 1967. It was released on September 18, 2007, on Big Beat Records and is the twenty-third installment of the Nuggets from the Golden State album series. Generally overshadowed by the garage scenes located in Los Angeles and San Jose, the San Francisco scene was uniquely influenced by the surplus of folk rock, which would eventually develop into psychedelic rock. For the most part, the groups presented on You Got Yours! do not exemplify the teenage-angst and rawness associated with the garage rock genre, but rather display a level of professionalism not expected from an adolescent band.

Musical highlights include the opening track by the Baytovens, which owes much of its influence to the Beatles and the Beau Brummels. Peter Wheat and the Breadmen's keyboard-driven number "Baby, What's New?" is well known for its inclusion on Pebbles, Volume 10, in 1980. A Rolling Stones-esque proto-punk composition, "Tomorrow's Soul Sound" by the Harbinger Complex perhaps does not resonate among garage enthusiasts as much as their song "I'll Think About It", but is still marked by its fuzz-toned instrumentals. Beginning as a typical pop group, the Spyders' "Gotta Find a New Love" represented their transition into an early soul band. Despite some the professionalism established by groups on You Got Yours!, others, most notably from the Just Six and Blue Lite Conspiracy, and the Soul Vendors, exemplify the crudeness and aggressiveness typical of the garage format.

You Got Yours! was released simultaneously as The San Francisco East Bay Scene: Garage Bands from the 60's Then and Now, a book written by Bruce G. Tahlser detailing the histories of individual bands associated with the San Francisco garage rock scene. The album includes rare photographs documenting each group, and informative liner notes penned by music historian Alec Palao.

== Track listing ==
1. The Baytovens: "Waiting for You" (Dwight Pitcaithley)
2. Peter Wheat and the Breadmen: "Baby What's New?" (Barry Hook)
3. Harbinger Complex: "Tomorrow's Soul Sound" (Jim Hockstaff, Robert Hoyle)
4. The Just Six: "I'm Gonna Be Gone" (David Corboy, Ken Simms)
5. The Shillings: "It's Up to You" (Graig Cahill)
6. The Blue Lite Conspiracy: "Her Heart Said No"
7. The Baytovens: "My House" (Pitcaithley)
8. The US Male: "You Got Yours" (Bruce Tahsler, Skip Mesquite)
9. Harbinger Complex: "Sometimes I Wonder" (Jim Hockstaff, Robert Hoyle)
10. The Just Six: "Bo Said" (Mike Cantrell, Tony Rhodes)
11. The Epics: "Humpty Dumpty" (Bobby Winkelman, Jim Brown)
12. The Donnybrookes: "You're Gonna Cry" (Terry Gifford)
13. The Gotham City Crime Fighters: "Who Stole the Batmobile" (Gerry Ralston)
14. The Shillings: "Not the Least Bit True" (Graig Cahill)
15. The Soul Vendors: "Get Out of My Eye" (Jim McClure, Sterling Hardin)
16. The Baytovens: "Luv Look Away" (Pitcaithley)
17. The Flintrocks: "Dynosaur"
18. The Bristol Boxkite: "I'm Feeling Good" (Bill Ellis)
19. The Immediate Family: "You're Taking Hold of Me" (Chip Taylor)
20. The Towaway Zone: "Away Girl" (Philip Franks, Randy Molitor)
21. The Spyders: "Gotta Find a New Love" (Dennis Dell Acqua)
22. The Gants: "Look at the Sun" (Brian Johnson, Dennis Battaglia, Kim Edwards, Tim Grand)
23. The Baytovens: "Such a Fool" (Pitcaithley)
24. The Day Trippers: "Where I Belong"
