= Green Crystal Ties, Volume 3: Gloria Meets 96 Tears =

Compilation album
- Released: April 7, 1998
- Recorded: 1960s
- Genre: Psychedelic rock; garage rock
- Length: 42:39
- Label: Collectables

chronology
Green Crystal Ties, Volume 2: Best of the 60s Garage Band Scene (1998)	Green Crystal Ties, Volume 3: Gloria Meets 96 Tears (1998)	Green Crystal Ties, Volume 4: Mind-Expanding 60s Psychedelia (1998)

Green Crystal Ties, Volume 3: Gloria Meets 96 Tears is the third installment in the Green Crystal Ties series of psychedelic and garage rock compilations issued by Collectables Records. It was released on April 7, 1998 and features songs by obscure American musical artists who recorded in the 1960s. Like all of the entries in the series, the highly colorful packaging is designed by Nicole Ruhl Fichera and on this occasion features a front cover photograph of Yesterday's Children, who are included in this set. The inner sleeve includes well-researched liner notes written by Steve Kaplan and Matt Wendelken which provide helpful biographical information about the bands and their songs.

The set commences with two tracks by the Beefeaters, first with the gyrating and thumping intensity of "Don't Hurt Me," which also appears on the Sundazed compilation Garage Beat '66 Volume 5, followed by "Change My Mind." The U.S. Britons adroitly mix folk and protopunk influences "Come On" and "I'll Show You a Man." The Chevelle V, from Texas display a gritty blues-based approach in "Come Back Bird," which also appears on Garage Beat '66, Volume 7 and "I'm Sorry Girl." Yesterday's Children, from Connecticut, do a feral rendition of "Gloria," followed by the downcast mood of "Love and Things." The folk rock-influenced Lewallen Brothers are represented here on the two cuts, "Tough He Was" and "Only a Dream." The set concludes with "Don't Hurt Me" by the Infinite Pyramid.

== Track listing ==
1. The Beefeaters: "Don't Hurt Me" 2:48
2. The Beefeaters: "Change My Mind" 2:22
3. The US Britons: "Come On" 3:11
4. The US Britons: "I'll Show You a Man" 1:50
5. The Chevelle V: "Come Back Bird" 2:23
6. The Chevelle V: "I'm Sorry Girl" 2:20
7. The Debonairs: "Lonely Is the Summer 2:06
8. Yesterday's Children: "Love and Things" 2:20
9. Yesterday's Children: "Gloria" 2:32
10. The Stumblin' Blox: "It's Alright" 1:53
11. The Bonnevilles "96 Tears" (Rudy Martinez) 2:11
12. The Keymen: "Little Latin Lupe Lu" 2:49
13. The Keymen: "Shop Around" (Berry Gordy, Jr./Smokey Robinson) 2:45
14. The Lewallen Brothers: "Tough He Was" 2:18
15. The Lewallen Brothers: "Only a Dream" 2:10
16. The Sidewinders: "Tears from Laughing" 2:26
17. The Sidewinders: "On a Windowsill" (Charley Aikens) 2:14
18. The Infinite Pyramid: "Don't Hurt Me" 2:01
