= Bad Girl (The Zakary Thaks song) =

- 2012 UK reissue.

Single by The Zakary Thaks
- B-side: "I Need You"
- Released: July 1966; October 1966 (national release)
- Recorded: 1966, Pharaoh Records Studio, McAllen, Texas
- Genre: Garage rock, proto-punk
- Length: 2:04
- Label: J-Beck; Mercury (national release)
- Songwriter(s): Chris Gerniottis, Pete Stinson, Stan Moore, Rex Gregory, John Lopez
- Producer(s): Carl Becker

The Zakary Thaks singles chronology
"Bad Girl" (1966)	"Face to Face" (1967)

"Bad Girl" is a song by the American garage rock band the Zakary Thaks, written by the whole group—Chris Gerniottis, Pete Stinson, Stan Moore, Rex Gregory, and John Lopez—and was first released for the band's debut single on J-Beck Records in July 1966 (see 1966 in music). The song was an immensely successful regional hit in Texas, precipitating "Bad Girl"'s national release on Mercury Records later in the year. Since its initial distribution, the tune has received further recognition for its appearance on several compilation albums.

== Background ==
Forming in early 1966, the Zakary Thaks rose to prominence in Corpus Christi, Texas, becoming a popular fixture, and rival to fellow group the Bad Seeds, while performing in the music venue known as the Carousel Club. The band members collectively adopted their moniker for sounding distinctively British, thereby symbolizing the group's alignment with the British Invasion, particularly the Kinks, the Yardbirds, and the Rolling Stones. The Zakary Thaks' R&B-influenced musical stance and assortment of original material appealed to record producer and Bad Seeds manager Carl Becker, who signed the band to his record label J-Beck.

Entering Jimmy Nicholls’ (who owned the local Pharaoh Records label, releasing material by several other Texas musical acts) studio in McAllen, Texas along with the Bad Seeds, the Zakary Thaks recorded "Bad Girl", for all intents and purposes as a live number on a basic two-track tape. All five members collaborated to pen the song, which was coupled with their compelling cover version of the Kinks' "I Need You". For lead vocalist Chris Gerniottis, "Bad Girl" was "like the one true picture of what the Zakary Thaks were as a group". Indeed, the composition reflects upon the group's adolescent sound inspired by early-Kinks music, though Gerniottis's bluesy vocals are remarkably mature given that he was only 15-years-old at the time of the song's recording. Musically, "Bad Girl" is also highlighted by Stan Moore's frantic drumming, and lead guitarist John Lopez's double-time guitar break, assembling one of the best examples of the musical genre of garage rock.

Upon release, "Bad Girl" propelled to number one regionally in Texas. The success of the single prompted Mercury Records to national distribute the song in October 1966. It began a string of high-quality singles, including the follow-up "Face to Face", that were immensely popular in Texas, but unheralded throughout the rest of the United States. In 1979, "Bad Girl" was finally recognized as a quintessential garage rock composition as a result of its inclusion on Pebbles, Volume 2. Other compilation albums that the song appears on includes J-Beck Story, Volume 2 and the 1998 expanded box-set of Nuggets: Original Artyfacts from the First Psychedelic Era, 1965–1968, along with the Zakary Thaks compilations Texas Band, Face to Face, Passage to India, Form the Habit, and It's the End: The Definitive Collection.

== Personnel ==
- Chris Gerniottis - lead vocals
- Pete Stinson - rhythm guitar
- Stan Moore - drums
- Rex Gregory - bass guitar
- John Lopez - lead guitar
