= Green Crystal Ties, Volume 10: 60s Garage Band Flashback =

Compilation album
- Released: April 7, 1998
- Recorded: 1960s
- Genre: Garage rock; psychedelic rock
- Length: 43:33
- Label: Collectables

chronology
Green Crystal Ties, Volume 9: The Great Lost Psychedelic Garage Bands (1998)	Green Crystal Ties, Volume 10: 60s Garage Band Flashback (1998)

Green Crystal Ties, Volume 10: 60s Garage Band Flashback is a compilation album featuring psychedelic and garage rock musical artists that recorded in the 1960s and early 1970s. It is the tenth and final installment of the Green Crystal Ties series and was released on Collectables Records on April 7, 1998. The album arguably features the most obscure musical artists featured in the series.

The set begins with a Merseybeat-flavored demo, "Nothing But You", by the Outcasts, cut when the group was still known as the Radiations. California produced the Stingrays, whose song "Something About You" emulates the beat music that was popularized in England. Another American group, the Mad Hatters, with their musical stance fixated on the Yardbirds, offer the tracks "Go Fight Alone" and the Dylanesque "A Pebble in My Sand". Texan band the Intruders make a dive into psychedelia on their Ell record label recordings "Temporary Insanity" and "The Lone Stranger". The Comets record an inspired rendition of the Rolling Stones' "The Last Time", sounding like an accomplished frat band, even though the members were under 15-years old. Other little-known bands that make an appearance on the album includes the Trees, the Englishmen, and the Mauraders.

== Track listing ==
1. The Outcasts: "Nothing but Love"
2. The Outcasts: "Something About You"
3. The Sting Rays: "I'm Back in Line"
4. The Sting Rays: "You're the Reason"
5. The Mad Hatters: "Go Fight Alone"
6. The Mad Hatters: "A Pebble in My Sand
7. The Intruders: "Temporary Insanity"
8. The Intruders: "The Lone Stranger"
9. The Comets: "The Last Time"
10. The Englishmen: "Summer Is Here"
11. The Englishmen: "96 Tears"
12. The Trees: "Do You Think About It Now (Feeling Groovy)"
13. The Trees: "The Only Life for Me"
14. The Shades: "Ginger Bread Man"
15. George Washington & the Cherry Stompers: "The Back Shelf of Your Mind"
16. Eddie Cunningham & the Lone Rangers: "Girl Don't Change Your Mind"
17. The Marsadees: "Wipe Out"
18. The Marsadees: "Lonely Sea"
