= It's the End: The Definitive Collection =

Compilation album by The Zakary Thaks
- Released: January 26, 2015
- Recorded: 1966–1969
- Genre: Garage rock; psychedelic rock
- Length: 1:00:20
- Label: Big Beat
- Producer: Alec Palao

It's the End: The Definitive Collection is a compilation album by the American garage rock band the Zakary Thaks, and was released on Big Beat Records on January 26, 2015 (see 2015 in music). The album is a collection of alternate takes, tracks that appeared on singles, and the first reissued sessions by bassist Rex Gregory and drummer Stan Moore in record producer Mike Taylor's side-project, Michael.

Although the Zakary Thaks' material has become better circulated prior to the album's release through similar means, It's the End marks the first time all the master recordings of the band's six singles were correctly featured on one album. The tracks previously unavailable include alternate versions of "Can You Hear Your Daddy’s Footsteps" "Please" and "Mirror of Yesterday". Songs "People Sec. VI" and "Gotta Make My Heart Turn Away" were recorded during Taylor's project Michael, and re-released for the first time with the album.

The tracks on It's the End originate from the J-Beck, Mercury, Thak, and C-Bee record labels. It spans across the Zakary Thaks entire recording career, from their beginnings in 1966 to their experimentation with psychedelia just before their disbandment in 1969.

== Track listing ==
1. "She's Got You" - 2:17
2. "Bad Girl" - 2:06
3. "Face to Face" - 2:43
4. "Won't Come Back" - 2:44
5. "It's the End" - 2:56
6. "I Need You" - 2:26
7. "Please" - 2:03
8. "Passage to India" - 2:31
9. "Mirror to Yesterday" - 2:54
10. "My Door" - 3:30
11. "Can You Hear Your Daddy's Footsteps" - 2:31
12. "Green Crystal Ties" - 3:27
13. "Outprint" - 2:10
14. "Weekday Blues" - 2:58
15. "Everybody Wants to Be Somebody" - 2:50
16. "Face to Face" (alternate version, take 12) - 3:01
17. "Please" (alternate stereo mix) - 2:08
18. "Mirror of Yesterday" (alternate stereo mix) - 3:05
19. "Can You Hear Your Daddy's Foot Steps" (alternate stereo mix) - 2:36
20. "I'd Only Laugh" (alternate stereo mix) - 3:02
21. "People Sec. VI" - 2:59
22. "Gotta Make My Heart Turn Away" - 2:42
