= Garage Beat '66 Volume 7: That's How It Will Be! =

Compilation album
- Released: 2007
- Recorded: 1960s
- Genre: Garage rock; psychedelic
- Length: 44:45
- Label: Sundazed

chronology
Garage Beat '66 Volume 6: Speak of the Devil... (2008)	Garage Beat '66 Volume 7: That's How It Will Be! (2007)

Garage Beat '66 Volume 7: That's How It Will Be! is the seventh installment in the Garage Beat '66 series of garage rock compilations issued by Sundazed Music, which is available exclusively on compact disc. Like all of the entries in the series, which is noted for good sound quality, all of the tracks are mastered from the original studio master sources and contain well-researched liner notes written by knowledgeable authorities.

The set begins with the frenzied "I'll Come Running,' by the Mad Hatters, from Annapolis, Maryland. Also featured is the grinding classic, "I'm in Pittsburgh and It's Raining," by San Antonio's the Outcasts. The set includes two classics from Detroit's the Unrelated Segments, the acerbic "Where You Gonna Go?," as well as "Cry, Cry, Cry," which concludes the set. The Human Expression's "Love at Psychedelic Velocity" builds up to breakneck speed. The Bad Seeds, from Corpus Christi, Texas perform a rendition of Slim Harpo's "I'm a King Bee," previously recorded by the Rolling Stones. The Liberty Bell performs the fuzz-drenched "That's How it Will Be" and the WordD (who also recorded as the Penthouse 5) is featured playing "Keep on Walking."

== Track listing ==
1. The Mad Hatters: "I'll Come Running"
2. The Human Expression: "Love at Psychedelic Velocity"
3. The Liberty Bell: "That's How it Will Be"
4. The Bad Seeds: "I'm a King Bee"
5. The Unrelated Segments: "Where You Gonna Go?"
6. The Esquires: "Judgment Day"
7. The Outcasts: "I'm In Pittsburgh (And It's Raining)"
8. The Lynx: "You Lie"
9. The Wild Things: "Tell Me"
10. The Penthouse 5: "You're Gonna Make Me"
11. District Six: "East Side Story"
12. The Lykes of Us : "Tell Me Why Your Light Shines"
13. Exotics: "Come with Me"
14. The Chevelle V: "Come Back Bird"
15. S.J. & Crossroads: "Darkest Hour"
16. The Word: "Keep on Walking"
17. The Livin' End: "Makin' Time"
18. The Unrelated Segments: "Cry, Cry, Cry"

== Catalogue and release information ==
- Compact disc (SC 11187)
