= Green Crystal Ties, Volume 5: Gems from the Garage Band Vaults =

Compilation album
- Released: April 7, 1998
- Recorded: 1960s
- Genre: Psychedelic rock; garage rock; acid rock
- Length: 45:59
- Label: Collectables

chronology
Green Crystal Ties, Volume 4: Mind-Expanding 60s Psychedelia (1998)	Green Crystal Ties, Volume 5: Gems from the Garage Band Vaults (1998)	Green Crystal Ties, Volume 6: Rarities from the Psychedelic Vaults (1998)

Green Crystal Ties, Volume 5: Gems from the Garage Band Vaults is the fifth installment in the Green Crystal Ties series of psychedelic and garage rock compilations issued by Collectables Records. It was released on April 7, 1998 and like volume 1 features songs by obscure bands who recorded in the 1960s. The series is known for good quality mastering and sound quality. Like all of the entries in the series, the highly colorful packaging is designed by Nicole Ruhl Fichera. The inner sleeve includes well-researched liner notes written by Steve Kaplan and Matt Wendelken which provide helpful biographical information about the bands and their songs.

The set begins with two songs by SJ & the Crossroads, "Funny Woman, followed by "London Girl" whose lyrics drool over a mini-skirted mod hipstress on a motorbike. From there, the North Invasion Force chime-in with the twelve a string guitar on "Blue Light in the Window" and "I Won't Be Back," followed by the Outer Limits' "Walkin' Away" and "The Waves." The set features two songs by the Nickel Bag: first an organ-fueled psychedelic mover, "The Woods," followed by the somber anti-Vietnam protest song, "It's a Hassle." The Morning Dew from Topeka Kansas are represented also by two cuts on the album, first a hook-laden "Touch of Magic" followed by the screaming Twister party frenzy of "No More." The Blue Things close out the set with "Waiting for Changes" and "Hollow."

== Track listing ==
1. SJ & the Crossroads: "Funny Woman" 2:10
2. SJ & the Crossroads: "London Girl" 1:53
3. The North Atlantic Invasion Force: "Blue Light in the Window" 2:05
4. The North Atlantic Invasion Force: "I Won't Be Back" 2:52
5. The Outer Limits: "Walkin' Away" 2:10
6. The Outer Limits: "The Waves" 2:51
7. The Nickel Bag: "The Woods" 2:49
8. The Nickel Bag: "It's a Hassle" 2:06
9. The Tempos: "Two Timer" 2:12
10. The Tempos: "You're Not Here" 3:18
11. Marcus: "1983" 3:02
12. Marcus: "The Life Game" 2:18
13. The Movin' Morfomen: "Try It" (Allan Clarke/Tony Hicks/Graham Nash) 4:05
14. The Movin' Morfomen: "What's Happened to Me" 2:13
15. The Morning Dew: "Touch of Magic" 2:21
16. The Morning Dew: "No More" 2:44
17. The Blue Things: "Waiting for Changes" 2:47
18. The Blue Things: Hollow 2:03
