= I Lied =

"I Lied" may refer to the following songs:

- "I Lied", a song by The Mixed Emotions, 1967; see Green Crystal Ties, Volume 8: Stomping Garage Band Legends
- "I Lied", a song by the Chi-Lites from Toby 1974
- "I Lied", a song by A House from I Am the Greatest, 1991
- "I Lied", a song by E.M.D. from A State of Mind, 2008
- "I Lied", song by Nicki Minaj from her album The Pinkprint, 2014
- "I Lied", a song by Mikey Way and Electric Century from Electric Century, 2015
- "I Lied", song by Fifth Harmony from their album 7/27, 2016
- "I Lied", song by Tove Styrke from her album Sway, 2018
- "I Lied (Intro)", song by Joyner Lucas from his album ADHD, 2020
