= I'll Come Running =

I'll Come Running may refer to:

- "I'll Come Running", a 1977 Livingston Taylor song on his album Three Way Mirror
- "I'll Come Running", a 1975 Brian Eno song on his album Another Green World
- "I'll Come Runnin'" (Connie Smith song), a 1967 country song by Connie Smith
- "I'll Come Running" (Neil Diamond song), a 1967 song written by Neil Diamond
- "I'll Come Running", a 1964 song written by Bert Russell for Lulu, covered in 1966 by the Mad Hatters.

== See also ==
- "I'll Come Running Back to You", a 1957 song by Sam Cooke
