= Pebbles, Volume 12 (1983 album) =

Pebbles, Volume 12 (LP)

Compilation album
- Released: 1983
- Recorded: Mid-1960s
- Genres: Garage rock, psychedelic rock
- Length: 33:27
- Label: AIP

chronology
Pebbles, Volume 11 (LP)	Pebbles, Volume 12 (LP)	Pebbles, Volume 13

Pebbles, Volume 12 is a compilation album among the LPs in the Pebbles series. The music on this album has no relation to Pebbles, Volume 12: The World that was released on CD many years later.

== Release data ==
This album was released by AIP Records (as #AIP-10002), in 1983 and was kept in print for many years, with reissues as late as 1995.

== Notes on the tracks ==
The Vejtables, from San Francisco are among the better known bands that are featured in the Pebbles series; their lead singer, Jan Errico would later move to the Mojo Men. These Outcasts are not the same band that was featured on Pebbles, Volume 1.

== Track listing ==
Side 1:

1. The Nomads: "From Zero Down" (Deatherage/Evans), 2:31
2. The Teddy Boys: "Mona" (Elias B. McDaniel), 2:52
3. The Coming Times: "Keep the Music Playing" (Rosenberg), 2:25
4. The Breakers: "Don't Send Me No Flowers (I Ain't Dead Yet)" (Weiss), 2:08 – Rel. 1965
5. Peter & the Rabbits: "Someone I've Got My Eyes Upon" (Gayden), 1:57
6. Pawnee Drive: "Ride" (Roberts), 2:31 – Rel. 1969
7. The Mad Hatters: "I'll Come Running" (Stuart/Berns), 2:22

Side 2:

1. The Vejtables: "Feel the Music" (Bailey/Fortunato), 2:50
2. Clockwork Orange: "Your Golden Touch" (Terry Frazier), 2:12
3. Clockwork Orange: "Do Me Right Now" (Doug Kershaw), 1:30
4. Richard and the Young Lions: "You Can Make It" (Brown/Bloodworth/Nader), 2:38
5. The Outcasts: "I Didn't Have to Love Her Anymore" (Foley), 3:11
6. The Jam: "Something's Gone" (Terry Smith), 2:53
7. The Free Thinkers: "You Were Born for Me" (Wes Farrell/Doc Pomus), 2:27
