= Green Crystal Ties, Volume 7: Mind-Expanding Punk of the 60s =

Compilation album
- Released: April 7, 1998
- Recorded: 1960s
- Genre: Garage rock; acid rock; proto-punk
- Length: 45:23
- Label: Collectables

chronology
Green Crystal Ties, Volume 6: Rarities from the Psychedelic Vaults (1998)	Green Crystal Ties, Volume 7: Mind-Expanding Punk of the 60s (1998)	Green Crystal Ties, Volume 8: Stomping Garage Band Legends (1998)

Green Crystal Ties, Volume 7: Mind-Expanding Punk of the 60s is a compilation album featuring American psychedelic and garage rock musical artists that recorded in the 1960s. It is the seventh installment of the Green Crystal Ties series and was released on Collectables Records on April 7, 1998. The album is not so "Mind-Expanding"—alluding to psychedelic music -- Volume 7 does offer the most hard-edged musical stance within the series.

The album opens with the Detroit-based band the Tidal Waves' sneering protopunk anthem "Action! (Speaks Louder Than Words)", followed by their number one regional hit "Farmer John". Somewhat confusingly, the two songs are tailed by an additional pair of tracks by another group named the Tidal Waves, from Maine, who record their own version of "Farmer John" in an approach similar to that of the Searchers. Tony Lane and the Fabulous Spades' "Baby, Please Don't Go" and "Baby, What Do You Want Me to Do" are perhaps the most genuinely raw and live recordings present on the album. Faithful renditions of John Lee Hooker's "Boom Boom" and Van Morrison's "Gloria" are compiled courtesy of the Outcasts from Long Island. Baton Rouge's the Basement Wall, well known in the south for their tenacious live performing, are featured with their snarling cover versions of "(We Ain't Got) Nothin' Yet" and "Louie, Louie". Other musical highlights include Tucson-favorites the Lewallen Brothers' "Wine, Wine, Wine", and the Sting Rays' punchy recording of "Eight Days a Week".

Each band on Volume 7 is complemented by extensive liner notes on a fold-out card. The Basement Wall instrumental "No Matter What Shape Your Stomach's In" is evidently present in-between their two tunes, but is not officially credited on the album.

== Track listing ==
1. The Tidal Waves: "Action! (Speaks Louder Than Words)"
2. The Tidal Waves: "Farmer John"
3. The Tidal Waves: "Farmer John"
4. The Tidal Waves: "Laugh"
5. Tony Lane and the Fabulous Spades: "Baby, Please Don't Go"
6. Tony Lane and the Fabulous Spades: "Baby, What You Want Me to Do"
7. The Outcasts: "Boom Boom"
8. The Outcasts: "Gloria"
9. The Basement Wall: "(We Ain't Got) Nothin' Yet"
10. The Basement Wall: "Louie, Louie"
11. The Fugitives: "You Can't Catch Me"
12. The Fugitives: "On the Run"
13. The Lewallen Brothers: "Wine, Wine, Wine"
14. The Missing Links: "Don't Let the Sun Catch You Crying"
15. The Sting Rays: "Eight Days a Week"
16. The Sting Rays: "Baby If I Loved You"
17. The Kings Court: "In the Midnight Hour"
18. The Kings Court: "Don't Put Me On"
