= Pebbles, Volume 10 =

Pebbles, Volume 10 may refer to:

- Pebbles, Volume 10 (1980 album)
- Pebbles, Volume 10 (1996 album)
