= The Head Shop =

Studio album by The Head Shop
- Released: 1969
- Recorded: 1969
- Genre: Psychedelic rock
- Length: 31:32 (LP)
- Label: Epic
- Producer: Milan; Maxim (Associate Producer)

The Head Shop is an American psychedelic rock band from New York that released one eponymous album on Epic in 1969. The album cover features a swirling group of multi-colored (and numbered) boxes that surround a black-and-white image of a shrunken head. The back cover is mostly black with minimal copy but also includes a shot of the band lit from beneath.

== Formation of the band ==
As related in the liner notes for the World IN Sound release of their album, The Head Shop began as a Brooklyn street-corner band and, as the Household Sponge, released a single in 1967 called "Scars" b/w "Second Best" on Murbo (catalogue #M-1017). "Second Best" was in the Spotlight list of songs that were predicted to reach the Hot 100 by Billboard in August 1967. The band also performed live under the name the Aladdins.

== Original release ==
Back cover

According to the original promotional material for the album, the band performs "9 musical chapters that will lead you into new musical and audiophile dimensions of psychedelic art of music". A commercial ad in New York's Screw magazine was blazoned with: "Do You Want Head? Blow Your Mind with the Head Shop Album!"

== Guest musician ==
Larry Coryell, a respected jazz guitarist is a "guest musician" that provides a second guitar solo on "I Feel Love Comin' On". Coryell's debut album on Vanguard was also released in 1969.

== Cover songs ==
Side 1 ends and Side 2 begins with two extremely familiar Beatles songs, "Yesterday" – reminiscent of the Deep Purple cover of "Help!" – plus a propulsive rendering of "Revolution". "Yesterday", along with an original song called "Where Have All the People Gone", are combined into "Opera in the Year 4000" that may function as a commentary on the state of the music world at the end of that decade: Even if all the people are gone in two thousand years, the then omnipresent Beatles standard would still survive.

The album also includes a melancholy version of another hit song of the period, "Sunny" by Bobby Hebb. Like "Yesterday", hundreds of other cover versions of "Sunny" are extant, but not like this: Eugene Chadbourne refers to this as the "so-called 'bad acid' version" of this song.

== Recent reviews ==
One recent reviewer describes the music as "a demented fusion of ’69 era heavy psych and ’66 era garage punk". A 2006 promotion of the CD reissue on eBay by "Groovers Paradise" describes the album this way: "This underground New York psychedelic project has a unique sound – soulful vocals, fluid Hammond organ, fuzzy bass, distorted lead guitars, lots of weird percussion instruments, augmented by unexpected stereo effects."

An anonymous Dutch fan calls this "a very special album" and makes a detailed track-by-track analysis of the record, citing influences on the album ranging from Arthur Brown to James Brown, and, regarding the "Revolution" cover: "The original idea was to mix Beatles with contemporary music (Schönberg and Mahler) into a new trip of music, making new music in a true ‘progressive’ edge.".

The accolades are not unanimous, however. The exhaustive Acid Archives describes the album as "full of sound effects, fuzz guitar and creative arrangements, but without the songs to elevate it to keeper status. A couple of Beatles covers are particularly ill-advised. The heavier songs are probably the highlights. Good but not great."

== Connection with Milan ==
Although the band is obscure by any standard, the Head Shop is probably the best known and one of the last of the many projects masterminded by Milan, an enigmatic music industry professional who produced and performed on a variety of recordings released in the 1960s. Virtually all of the Milan projects, including the Head Shop are highly sought collector's items, and original sealed copies of the Epic album surface occasionally. The album was produced by Milan, and the associate producer is Maxim; they are also listed as the songwriters on the original songs, which include "Listen with a Third Ear", "Heaven Here We Come" and "Prophecy".

== Reissues ==
The album has been reissued on two different German labels, Synton in 1998 and World in Sound in 2004. The WIS reissue includes 7 bonus tracks, along with a copy of both sides of the page in the 1969 Screw Magazine where the ad appeared. The bonus tracks run the gamut from folk to flower power to psychedelic pop and include songs by the Household Sponge (the predecessor band to The Head Shop, which also performed under the name the Aladdins), Licorice Schtik (a band being promoted by Milan in the same time period), and other earlier projects including The Downtown Collection. The artists on the last two bonus tracks are unknown; "Groovy Feelings" was written by Milan, "In Central Park" was written by Max Ellen.

The Synton reissue includes four bonus tracks by Household Sponge and Licorice Schtik, but a full track listing could not be located.

== Personnel ==
- Danny Prosseda, Guitar, Fuzz Bass (on "Heaven Here We Come")
- Drew Sbordone, Bass
- Joe Siano, Vocals
- Jesse Luca, Drums, Percussion
- Milan, Screams
- Geoff Wright, Hammond/Farfisa Organ, Fuzz Bass (on "Revolution" and "I Feel Love Comin' On")
- Maxim, Violin Solo (on "Prophecy")
- Larry Coryell, Guest Musician, Second Guitar Solo (on "I Feel Love Comin' On")

== Release history ==
- Original LP: Epic Records with yellow label (#BN 26476) – rel. 1969
- Bootleg LP: Same but with dark label – rel. 1990's
- Reissued LP (or possible bootleg): Same with yellow label – rel. 2000's
- Reissue CD (with 4 bonus tracks): Synton Records (#DR9856) – rel. 1998
- Reissue CD (with 7 bonus tracks): World In Sound Records (#WIS-1024) – rel. 2004

== Track listing ==
=== Original LP ===
Side 1:

1. Head Shop (Milan/Maxim/R. Craig), 2:56
2. Heaven Here We Come (Milan), 2:40
3. Sunny (Bobby Hebb), 3:11
4. Listen with a Third Ear (Milan/Maxim), 2:30
5. Opera in the Year 4000 (Milan), 4:25
  - Where Have All the People Gone (Milan)
  - Yesterday (Lennon–McCartney)

Side 2:

1. Revolution (John Lennon/Paul McCartney), 2:28
2. I Feel Love Comin' On (Milan), 6:20
3. Prophecy (Maxim/Milan), 2:17
4. Infinity (Milan), 4:45

=== Bonus Tracks, 2004 Reissue ===
- "Scars" (by The Household Sponge), 2:34
- "Second Best" (by The Household Sponge), 2:14
- "Flowers, Flowers" (by Licorice Schtik), 2:00
- "Kissing Game" (by Licorice Schtik), 2:03
- "Sunshine" (Milan) (by The Downtown Collection), 1:12
- "Groovy Feelings" (Milan), 1:50
- "In Central Park" (M. Ellen), 1:53

== Compilation albums ==
Head Shop –

- Sixties Archives, Volume 8 (CD)
- Hell Bent for Leather (LP)

Heaven Here We Come –

- Psychedelic Dream (LP)

Prophecy –

- Psychedelic Vision (CD)

Infinity –

- Hell Bent for Leather (LP)
