= The Stumblin' Blox =

American garage rock band

The Stumbling Blox
- Origin: Abilene, Texas, United States
- Genres: Garage rock
- Years active: 1960s

The Stumblin' Blox were an American garage rock band from Abilene, Texas who were active in the 1960s. They are known for songs such as "It's Alright." Though they failed to achieve commercial success, their works have come to the attention of garage rock enthusiasts and collectors over the years and have been included several compilations.

The band hailed from Abilene, and they were influenced by groups such as the McCoys and Paul Revere & the Raiders. According to music writer Bruce Eder, the Stumblin' Blox "...sounded even more like the early Rascals at their punkiest..." They recorded an unissued acetate in 1966 featuring the organ-driven "It's Alright" baked with the ballad "Lace of Satin." Their songs have been included on various compilations such as Texas Punk 1966, Vol. 1 on Cicadelic Records, as well as Acid Visions: The Complete Collection, Vol. 2. and Green Crystal Ties, Volume 3: Gloria Meets 96 Tears both put out on Collectables Records.

== Discography ==
- "It's Alright" b/w "Lace of Satin" (unissued acetate, 1966)
