= Love at Psychedelic Velocity =

Compilation album by The Human Expression
- Released: October 24, 1994
- Recorded: 1966–1967
- Genre: Garage rock; psychedelic rock
- Label: Collectables

Love at Psychedelic Velocity is a retrospective album by the American garage rock band the Human Expression that was released on the compact disc format.

== Release data ==
This album was released as a CD by Collectables Records in 1994 as #COL-CD-0588.

== Musical highlights ==
The album contains the music on all three of their singles, plus demo recordings of their first two singles (including the original B-side of their first single). A mark of successful songwriting is that the album can be enjoyed when two versions of the same song are practically side by side. Additionally: "Their demos were as good as many contemporary groups' released singles." (Apparently "Sweet Child of Nothingness" is the only song that was not written by a band member).

There are also four unreleased recordings by band leader Jim Quarles to close the album. Presumably, Quarles wrote these songs as well. Included as well is rare memorabilia images of the band.

All of their reissued recordings are included with the exception of "Your Mind Works in Reverse" (which is included on another Collectables Records CD, The Human Expression and other Psychedelic Groups).

== Track listing ==
All tracks credited to the Human Expression unless otherwise noted

1. Everynight (Jim Quarles/Jim Foster) – Demo Recording
2. Readin' Your Will (Jim Quarles/Jim Foster) – Demo Recording
3. Everynight (Jim Quarles/Jim Foster)
4. Love at Psychedelic Velocity (Jim Quarles/Jim Foster)
5. Calm Me Down (Jim Quarles/Jim Foster) – Demo Recording
6. Optical Sound (Jim Quarles/Jim Foster) – Demo Recording
7. Calm Me Down (Jim Quarles/Jim Foster)
8. Optical Sound (Jim Quarles/Jim Foster)
9. I Don't Need Anybody (Jim Quarles/Jim Foster)
10. Sweet Child of Nothingness (Mars Bonfire)
11. Outside of It All , by Jim Quarles
12. Following Me , by Jim Quarles
13. Who Is Burning? , by Jim Quarles
14. You Need Lovin' Too , by Jim Quarles
