= Pebbles, Volume 12: The World =

Compilation album
- Released: October 5, 1999
- Recorded: 1960s
- Genres: Garage rock, psychedelic rock
- Length: 1:12:46
- Label: AIP

chronology
Pebbles, Volume 11: Northern California (2007)	Pebbles, Volume 12: The World (1999)

Pebbles, Volume 12: The World is a compilation album featuring psychedelic and garage rock musical artists from outside North America and the UK that were active in the 1960s. It is a compact disc installment of the Pebbles series and was released on AIP Records on October 5, 1999 (see 1999 in music).. The music on this album has no relation to Pebbles, Volume 12 (LP), released in 1983.

Though the album specifies that all the recordings were produced outside North America and the UK, the Rokes, the Shamrocks, and the Scorpions were originally British outfits that moved abroad across continental Europe. Despite the geographically wide-array of material, most of the groups were heavily influenced by bands of the British Invasion. Musical highlights include the Shamrocks' R&B single, "Midnight Train", which was not included on their cult classic album. A French cover version of John Mayall's "I'm Your Witchdoctor", retitled "Curieux Docteur", is performed by Noel Deschamps. Additionally, Sir Henry and His Butlers' "Pretty Style" exhibits psychedelic pop and exotic sitar instrumentals.

Pebbles, Volume 12: The World was the first reissue for nearly all of its contents. Although some of the songs are covered by other artists to an extent that they are more common than others, the album also marks the most commercially accessible release of the material in the U.S. and the UK.

== Track listing ==
1. Takeshi Terauchi & Bunnys: "Moanin'"
2. The Four Rockets: "The Place Where She Lives"
3. The Shamrocks: "Midnight Train"
4. Shake Spears: "I Can't Tell"
5. The Henchmen: "Baby What's Wrong"
6. The Phantoms: "Roadrunner"
7. The Klan: "Already Mine"
8. The Merrymen: "Walking Down Lonesome Road"
9. The Nicols: "She Had a Name to Find Out"
10. Noel Deschamps: "I'm Your Witchdoctor"
11. The Odd Persons: "I'm Cryin'"
12. The Scorpions: "Baby Back Now"
13. The Honestmen: "I've Been Wrong"
14. The Rokes: "She Asks of You"
15. John Wooley and Just Born: "Look and You Will Find"
16. John Wooley and Just Born: "You're Lying"
17. The Shirrows: "Not for Me"
18. The Cedars: "Hide If You Want to Hide"
19. Evariste: "Connais-Tu L'Animal Qui Inventa Le Calcul Intégral"
20. Sir Henry and His Butlers: "Pretty Style "
21. Los Salvages: "Las Ovejias"
22. The Tonics: "Daddy"
23. The Five Gentlemen: "Dis-Nous Dylan"
24. The Pleazers: "Bald-Headed Woman"
25. The Entertainers: "Searching"
26. The Satins: "Too Much Monkey Business"
27. Brothers Grimm: "Beautiful Delilah"
