= Pebbles, Volume 11 (1983 album) =

Compilation album
- Released: 1983
- Recorded: Mid-1960s
- Genre: Garage rock, psychedelic rock
- Length: 33:36
- Label: AIP

chronology
Pebbles, Volume 10 (LP)	Pebbles, Volume 11	Pebbles, Volume 12 (LP)

Pebbles, Volume 11 is a compilation album among the LP's in the Pebbles series and has no relation to the Pebbles, Volume 11 CD that was released many years later. The cover was adapted and colorized for a later Pebbles double CD, Essential Pebbles, Volume 2.

== Release data ==
This is the first album in the Pebbles series to be released by AIP Records (as #AIP-10001), in 1983. It is also the first release on the AIP label.

== Notes on the tracks ==
Bomp! Records evidently had numerous tracks all lined up when they decided to continue the Pebbles series, because this is one of the best albums of the entire series. One of the featured performers is the mysterious Milan (also known as The Leather Boy), who issued numerous classic singles under several different names in the 1965-1967 period; he was also an excellent songwriter and producer who has credits on many other records released throughout the decade.

The surprisingly effective cuts by Modds and Barking Spyders are among the sparest garage rock tracks available; the former features only a guitar and tambourine plus growling vocals about a relationship breaking up, while the melody of the latter song — three notes up, three notes down — could scarcely be simpler.

The album also has an unusual cover of a relatively rare Rolling Stones song, "The Spider and the Fly".

About the Illusions, the liner notes state: "This band is not related to the well-known Illusion of Long Island, or the other Illusion/Illusions bands, of which there were many."

In the Pebbles series, the track listing on the LP cover and/or label don't always match the order in which the songs actually appear on the record; in this case, the superb psychedelic rock song "Visions" closes Side 1, while it appears on the cover as the fifth track.

Notable tracks on this LP include Galaxies IV's "Don't Lose Your Mind", Looking Glasses' "Visions", and Third Evolution's "Don't Play With Me".

== Track listing ==
Side 1:

1. The Leather Boy: "I'm a Leather Boy" (Milan), 1:53
2. The Leather Boy: "Shadows" (Milan), 2:10
3. Illusions: "I Know" (Gardner/Touchton/Hewett/Williams), 2:25
4. The Galaxies IV: "Don't Lose Your Mind" (The Galaxies IV), 2:40
5. Rudy Von Ruden: "The Spider and the Fly" (Mick Jagger/Keith Richards), 3:04
6. Third Evolution: "Gone, Gone, Gone" (Therion), 2:34 – rel. 1966
7. Looking Glasses: "Visions" (Berke/Naktin), 2:40" – rel. 1967

Side 2:

1. The Aardvarks: "I'm Higher than I'm Down" (Aardvarks), 2:12
2. Fountain of Youth: "Hard Woman" (Ganz/Schnell), 2:23
3. Modds: "Leave My House" (Modds), 2:15
4. Barking Spyders: "I Want Your Love" (Perkins/Mackaness), 2:41
5. Beaver Patrol: "E.S.P." (Bledsoe/Humphreys), 2:33
6. Third Evolution: "Don't Play with Me" (Therion), 2:27" – rel. 1966
7. Milan (the Leather Boy): "You Gotta Have Soul" (Milan), 1:39
