= Green Crystal Ties (series) =

Series of compilation albums

Green Crystal Ties is an extensive series of compilation albums focusing on obscure and relatively unknown psychedelic and garage rock musical artists that recorded during the 1960s and early 1970s. Released on Collectables Records, Green Crystal Ties features ten total albums, all of which were issued in 1998. For the most part, the albums expand on past series distributed by Collectables Records and its contemporary Cicadelic Records, and as with Nuggets employ original master source elements when possible and arrange the various installments along contextual and conceptual lines. The music tends to be more refined in the earlier volumes of the series, progressively venturing out into more obscure and unknown material later much in the same fashion as the Pebbles or Back from the Grave series. The various installments are not ordered chronologically, but instead place emphasis on certain regions or musical styles. Although most of the music was recorded by American groups, there are a few exceptions such the heavy metal band Black Sabbath and King Richard and the Knights. Green Crystal Ties pays homage to the band the Zakary Thaks and their song of the same name. All of the entries are housed highly colorful packaging designed by Nicole Ruhl Fichera and each features a photograph of one of the compiled bands on the front cover. The packaging for all entries includes well-researched liner notes written by Steve Kaplan and Matt Wendelken which provide helpful biographical information about the bands and their songs.

== Discography ==
- Green Crystal Ties, Volume 1: Garage Band Rebels
- Green Crystal Ties, Volume 2: Best of the 60s Garage Band Scene
- Green Crystal Ties, Volume 3: Gloria Meets 96 Tears
- Green Crystal Ties, Volume 4: Mind-Expanding 60s Psychedelia
- Green Crystal Ties, Volume 5: Gems from the Garage Band Vaults
- Green Crystal Ties, Volume 6: Rarities from the Psychedelic Vaults
- Green Crystal Ties, Volume 7: Mind-Expanding Punk of the 60s
- Green Crystal Ties, Volume 8: Stomping Garage Band Legends
- Green Crystal Ties, Volume 9: The Great Lost Psychedelic Garage Bands
- Green Crystal Ties, Volume 10: 60s Garage Band Flashback
