= Peter Wheat and the Breadmen =

Background information
- Origin: Fremont, California, United States
- Genres: Garage rock; folk rock
- Years active: 1964–1967
- Label: Amber
- Spinoff of: The Night Caps
- Past members: Roger Kennedy; Barry Houk; Bob Birdwell; Terry Rissman; Chuck Tedford

Peter Wheat and the Breadmen were an American garage rock band formed in Fremont, California, in 1964. The group became a popular live attraction regionally, and released one single that has since been reissued on compilation albums.

== History ==
Peter Wheat and the Breadmen's origins trace back to a rock and roll group called the Night Caps which formed in Oakland in 1957. The band became regionally popular on the teen club circuit in Northern California, and released two singles on Amber Records that were composed of self-penned material by saxophonist Barry Carlos. After seven years of being billed as the Night Caps, the group decided during a rehearsal to change the name to better cater to the changing musical tastes of the pop culture. Carlos recalled how the band came up with the new moniker, saying, "'How about something that has to do with money, like dough or bread.' Bob Fox instantaneously blurted out with, 'How about Peter Wheat and The Breadmen?' (Peter Wheat was a bread company that delivered bread to homes in brightly painted trucks)".

The band debuted the new name in 1964 at Fremont's UAW Hall, without mentioning that Peter Wheat and the Breadmen were the Night Caps, to see if the name alone would attract a large audience. For six months, the group performed regionally while outfitted with bakers aprons. After achieving a considerable following, the group disbanded, and Carlos formed BLP Productions to promote the next band that would carry on the Peter Wheat and the Breadmen name. Carlos discovered Fremont quintet the Tarantels, whose lineup consisted of Roger Kennedy (lead vocals, rhythm guitar), Barry Houk (lead guitar), Bob Birdwell (bass guitar), Terry Rissman (drummer), and Chuck Tedford (keyboards), gigging at the San Leandro Rollerina in support of the Turtles. Carlos explains his decision to choose the Tarantels, saying, "they were not afraid to test their creativity by exploring innovative chord changes on new original material or embark on complicated arrangements of cover tunes that I arranged for them". Although initially the Tarantels assumed the Peter and the Breadmen identity almost exactly, upon the band's insistence, they dropped the apron gimmick in favor of their own style.

Thanks to Carlos's marketing and scheduling, Peter Wheat and the Breadmen soon began opening for prominent music acts such as the Byrds, the Animals, and frequently were paired with Paul Revere & the Raiders. In March 1966, the band recorded "Baby, What's New?" and "All the Time" for their lone single, which was released on the Amber label and met with regional success. With all the good fortune the band was enjoying, they were scheduled to open for the Beatles' August 29, 1966 performance at Candlestick Park, however conflicts with labor unions limited the group to being spectators to the Fab Four's final live act. In September 1966, Birdwell and Kennedy were met with controversy when their school district refused enrollment by reasoning that their hair was too long. The opposition received brief national media attention until Birdwell and Kennedy conceded and trimmed their hair. In late 1966, Peter Wheat and the Breadmen, as a result of Carlos's encouragement and inspiration from the Beatles' song "Got to Get You into My Life", added a horn section to their live act. However, the professionalism of the horn players clashed with the band's free-form instrumentals, and consequently caused the group's disbandment in early 1967.

Since their breakup, the band's material has resurfaced on compilation albums, making their single revered among garage rock enthusiasts. The song "Baby, What's New?" appears on Pebbles, Volume 10 and You Got Yours! East Bay Garage 1965 - 1967, and "All the Time" is featured on Pebbles, Volume 11: Northern California.

== Members ==
- Roger Kennedy - Lead vocals, rhythm guitar
- Barry Houk - Lead guitar
- Bob Birdwell - Bass guitar
- Terry Reisman - Drums
- Chuck Tedford - Keyboards

== Discography ==
- "Baby, What's New?" b/w "All the Time" - Amber Records (Amber 6657), 1966
