= The Lewallen Brothers =

American garage rock band

- From left to right: Bobby Lewallen, Tim Lewallen, Dennis Gamble, Cal Lewallen and Keith Lewallen.

Background information
- Origin: Tucson, Arizona, United States
- Genres: Garage rock; folk rock
- Years active: 1962–1981, 1989–present
- Label: Zoom
- Past members: Cal Lewallen Jr. Keith Lewallen; Tim Lewallen; Bobby Lewallen; Dennis Gamble; Gayle Ann Lewallen; Cal Lewallen Sr. Mike Ramsey

The Lewallen Brothers were an American garage rock band formed in Tucson, Arizona in 1962. Combining an element of folk rock, similar to the sound of the Beau Brummels, with the essence of a raw garage band, the group became immensely popular in Arizona. Though the Lewallen Brothers never broke through to a national audience, the band is noted for being one of the longest-enduring garage musical acts to emerge from the 1960s, as the group performed well into the 1990s.

== History ==
Formed in 1962, the group was originally known as the CoKats, and consisted of brothers Cal (bass guitar, vocals) Keith (lead guitar, vocals), Tim (rhythm guitar, vocals) and Bobby Lewallen (organ, vocals). The band soon recruited Dennis Gamble (drums), and were occasionally joined by their sister Gayle Ann (vocals) and father Cal senior (bass guitar), while boasting a repertoire that featured material from the Everly Brothers, Chuck Berry, and the Ventures. With an established presence on the teen dance club and bar circuit, the CoKats entered the studio to record four demos on November 14, 1964. From the sessions, the song "Tough He Was" was presented to record producer Bob Keane, who released the tune on the group's debut single, and convinced the CoKats to change their name to the Lewallen Brothers.

By the mid-1960s, the group was opening for musical acts such as the Turtles, the Beau Brummels, and Paul Revere and the Raiders. Ironically, the hard-pressed schedule that came with the Lewallen Brothers being a live musical act consequently impeded the group from recording consistently. Music critic Bruce Eder explains "Their impeccable harmony singing, coupled with their considerable instrumental prowess and their tight sound, made them highly desireable [sic] both as a warm-up act as well as a backing band". In 1967, the band released the two singles "It Must Be a Dream" and "Only a Dream", both of which were met with regional success. After winning a battle of the bands contest in 1968, the group earned an appearances on Dick Clark's television program Happening '68, competing on three shows. However, without a nationally distributing record label to back them, the Lewallen Brothers could not capitalize on the exposure.

In 1969, Gamble departed the band and was replaced by Mike Ramsey. The band returned to Tucson, becoming the house band for the Cedars music club, with the brothers also working part-time as plumbers in their family business. In 1981, the Lewallen Brothers went on a decade-long hiatus after Bobby Lewallen died from cancer. Returning in the early 1990s without Tim Lewallen, who decided to become a plumber full-time, the band occasionally performed around Arizona. The compilation album Hitch-Hike was released in December 1995, and featured all the group's recorded material. Other albums the band appears on include The Cicadelic Sixties, Volume 7 – From Texas to Tucson!, Green Crystal Ties, Volume 3: Gloria Meets 96 Tears, Green Crystal Ties, Volume 7: Mind-Expanding Punk of the 60s, The Tucson Sound 1960–1968: Think of the Good Times!, and Wyld Sydes, Volume 4.
