= Green Crystal Ties, Volume 4: Mind-Expanding 60s Psychedelia =

Compilation album
- Released: April 7, 1998
- Recorded: 1960s
- Genre: Psychedelic rock; garage rock
- Length: 43:06
- Label: Collectables

chronology
Green Crystal Ties, Volume 3: Gloria Meets 96 Tears (1998)	Green Crystal Ties, Volume 4: Mind-Expanding 60s Psychedelia (1998)	Green Crystal Ties, Volume 5: Gems from the Garage Band Vaults (1998)

Green Crystal Ties, Volume 4: Mind-Expanding 60s Psychedelia is the fourth installment in the Green Crystal Ties series of psychedelic and garage rock compilations issued by Collectables Records. It was released on April 7, 1998 and like volume 1 features songs by Texas garage and psychedelic bands who recorded in the 1960s. The series is known for good quality mastering and sound quality. Like all of the entries in the series, the highly colorful packaging is designed by Nicole Ruhl Fichera. The inner sleeve includes well-researched liner notes written by Steve Kaplan and Matt Wendelken which provide helpful biographical information about the bands and their songs.

The set begins with the folk rock stylings of "Since You've Been Gone" and "Masters of War" by The Uncalled For. The Exotics follow with harder mind-bending fare with "Queen of Shadows" and "I Was Alone," which are added extra grit by Robert Price's raspy vocals, punctuated by Tommy Spalding's guitar chords, and a thundering rhythm section made up of Chris Brown on bass and Geof West on drums. The Outside In follow suit in similar fashion with the grinding "You Ain't Gonna Bring Me Down to My Knees." The WordD are represented in two cuts, "Keep on Waling" and "You're Gonna Make Me." Other bands featured are the District Six, the Couriers, and Hydro Pyro. The Couriers perform the haunting "Just Tell Me." The Stowaways, from North Carolina are the last band featured beginning with a bluesy "What a Shame," then a rendition of the Byrds' "It Won't Be Wrong," and at last a reworking of the Beatles' "It's Only Love," which closes out the set.

== Track listing ==
1. The Uncalled For: "Since You've Been Gone" 2:44
2. The Uncalled For: "Masters of War" 2:21
3. The Exotics: "Queen of Shadows" (Frank Sutton) 2:26
4. The Exotics: "I Was Alone" (Frank Sutton) 2:00
5. The Outside In: "You Ain't Gonna Bring Me Down to My Knees" 3:08
6. Hydro Pyro: "Id" 1:59
7. Hydro Pyro: "Hydro Pyro" 2:02
8. The WordD: "Keep on Walking" 2:16
9. The WordD: You're Gonna Make Me (Jon Williams) 1:52
10. Knights Bridge: "Make Me Some Love" 3:05
11. Knights Bridge: "CJ Smith" 2:27
12. The District Six: "She Cried No" (Bob Seger) 2:23
13. The District Six: "7 and 7 Is" (Arthur Lee) 2:04
14. The Couriers: "I Couldn't Care Less" 2:27
15. Couriers: "Just Tell Me" 3:22
16. The Stowaways: "What a Shame" 2:39
17. The Stowaways: "It Won't Be Wrong" 1:55
18. The Stowaways: "It's Only Love" (John Lennon/Paul McCartney) 1:56
