= The North Atlantic Invasion Force =

American rock band

Background information
- Origin: New Haven, Connecticut, United States
- Genres: Garage rock; folk rock
- Years active: 1964-1969
- Labels: Congressional; Majestic; Mr. G; Staff
- Past members: George Morgio; Nick Tirozzi; Neil Mitchill; Ed Dombrowski; Jim Gaffney

The North Atlantic Invasion Force (sometimes referred to as "NAIF") was an American garage rock band from New Haven, Connecticut who were active in the 1960s. They were led by vocalist and principal songwriter George Morgio, many of whose song lyrics were concerned with interpersonal relationships or were otherwise topical in nature, focusing issues such as free speech and the ongoing war in Vietnam.

The band was formed by George Morgio in New Haven, Connecticut 1964. Their lineup consisted of Morgio on lead vocals (and sometimes guitar), Nick Tirozzi on lead and rhythm guitar (often an eclectic twelve string guitar), Neil Mitchill on bass, Ed Dombrowski on keyboards, and Jim Gaffney on drums. North Atlantic Invasion Force achieved success in the southern Connecticut area, releasing several songs such which became hits on the local charts.

The band's first recordings were made in late 1966 and would result in the 7-inch single, "Blue and Green Gown" b/w "Fire, Wind, and Rain," which appeared on the Congressional label in February 1967. Their next single came out on the Majestic label in September and featured the intensely delivered "Sweet Bird of Love" on the A-side backed with the folk rock novelty "Elephant in My Tambourine." In February 1968 they released the topical song "Black on White," which generated controversy. The song's subject matter dealt with the issue of free speech, but its title led many to falsely assume it was about race. Several radio stations refused to air it. The band's producer suggested that the band to re-record the vocal tracks with different lyrics to appease reluctant broadcasters, so the Morgio wrote a new set of lyrics under a new title and the band re-recorded the vocal tracks. The re-done and re-released version was titled "In the U.S.A." The original version of "Black and White" nonetheless became hit in the southern Connecticut markets, reaching #1 in some towns and received radio exposure in other areas, even being played on American Bandstand. In addition to playing clubs, colleges, and concerts, the NAIF opened for acts such as the Rascals, the Rolling Stones, the McCoys, the Searchers, the Zombies, Vanilla Fudge, and George Carlin. In the intervening spell, the band issued single featuring "Rainmaker." By 1968, the various members of the band graduated from high school and were beginning to move in different directions. Their last release was "Loves No Game," which appeared on Staff Records in 1969. The band broke up shortly thereafter.

Following the breakup, Morgio pursued a solo career, playing original songs in clubs, colleges, and concerts in the early 1970s. In 1973 he took a hiatus from music, which ended up lasting for thirty years. He started a successful antiques business. In 2004, Morgio returned to writing and performing original material. His song lyrics continue to deal with emotional concerns and interpersonal relationships, as well as topical themes reflecting his interest in issues such as world peace and homelessness.

In the intervening years since the band's demise, their work has come to the attention of garage rock collectors and enthusiasts. In 1995 their complete recordings, which include fourteen original works, were compiled on The History of Garage Bands in the 60's: Volume I, put out by Cicadelic Records. Two of their songs appear on Green Crystal Ties, Volume 5: Gems from the Garage Band Vaults, assembled by Collectables Records.

== Membership ==
- George Morgio (lead vocals, guitar)
- Nick Tirozzi (lead and rhythm guitar)
- Neil Mitchill (bass)
- Ed Dombrowski (keyboard)
- Jim Gaffney (drums)

== Discography ==
- "Blue and Green Gown" b/w "Fire, Wind, and Rain" (Congressional 999, February 1967)
- "Sweet Bird of Love" b/w "Elephant In My Tambourine" (Majestic 998, September 1967)
- "Black on White" b/w "The Orange Patch" (Mr. G. 808, February 1968)
- "Rainmaker" b/w "Elephant in My Tambourine" (Mr. G 819, August 1968)
- "In the U.S.A." b/w "My Tambourine" (Majestic 1001, 1968)
- "Loves No Game" b/w "Loves No Game" (Staff 10006, 1969)
