= Green Crystal Ties, Volume 8: Stomping Garage Band Legends =

Compilation album
- Released: April 7, 1998
- Recorded: 1960s
- Genre: Garage rock
- Length: 51:47
- Label: Collectables

chronology
Green Crystal Ties, Volume 7: Mind-Expanding Punk of the 60s (1998)	Green Crystal Ties, Volume 8: Stomping Garage Band Legends (1998)	Green Crystal Ties, Volume 9: The Great Lost Psychedelic Garage Bands (1998)

Green Crystal Ties, Volume 8: Stomping Garage Band Legends is a compilation album featuring garage rock musical artists that recorded in the 1960s. It is the eighth installment of the Green Crystal Ties series and was released on Collectables Records April 7, 1998. The album, for what it lacks in complex lyricism, centers around frantic performances alluding to teenage alienation and angst toward society.

== Overview ==
The album opens with the Unrelated Segments' two most-recognized tracks, "Story of My Life", a song detailing a man's difficulties with women that also appears on the 1998 reissue of Nuggets: Original Artyfacts from the First Psychedelic Era, 1965–1968, and "Where You Gonna Go?". Represented next are the Shandells Inc., whose fuzz-toned, and jangling organ instrumentals, highlighted on "Say What I Mean" and "Just Try", are oddities on their otherwise country and gospel-dominated record label, Woodrich Records. Other more obscure musical acts such as the folky Mixed Emotions and the surf rock-influenced Innsmen, with their charismatic styles, have music historian Bruce Eder ponder "if they sounded this good on-stage and, if so, why they didn't get further than this". Additional musical high points on Volume 8 include the Outcasts, legendary in garage rock circled for the song "I'm in Pittsburgh (And It's Raining)", the delicate harmonies of "Bad Day Blues" by the Headstones, and raw cover versions of "Dirty Water" and "I'm Crying" by the Apollos.

== Track listing ==
1. The Unrelated Segments: "Story of My Life"
2. The Unrelated Segments: "Where You Gonna Go?"
3. The Shandells Inc.: "Say What I Mean"
4. The Shandells Inc.: "Just Cry"
5. The Mixed Emotions: "Marie"
6. The Mixed Emotions: "I Lied"
7. The Innsmen: "Things Are Different Now"
8. The Innsmen: "I Don't Know"
9. Carrolls Mood: "What You're Doing to Me"
10. Carrolls Mood: "Out She Goes"
11. The Outcasts: "I'm in Pittsburgh (And It's Raining)"
12. The Outcasts: "Route 66"
13. The Headstones: "24 Hours (Everyday)"
14. The Headstones: "Bad Day Blues "
15. The Apollos: "Dirty Water"
16. The Apollos: "I'm Crying"
17. The Fronts: "Catch a Thief"
18. The Fronts: "The Haul"
