= Leo and the Prophets =

American garage rock band

Background information
- Origin: Austin, Texas, United States
- Genres: Garage rock; psychedelic rock
- Years active: 1966–1967
- Label: Totem
- Past members: Leo Ellis; Rod Haywood; Bill Powell; Dan Hickman; Travis Ellis

Leo and the Prophets were an American garage rock band formed in Austin, Texas, in 1966. Like their contemporary the 13th Floor Elevators, Leo and the Prophets experimented with psychedelic music and generated some controversy with their on-stage actions and attire. The band is best-remembered for their lone single "Tilt-a-Whirl", which also was subjected to scrutiny at the time of its original release on Totem Records in 1967. In more recent times, the song has been considered a classic of Texas garage music.

== History ==
Former jazz guitarist Leo Ellis (lead guitar, vocals), in an effort to become popular with teenage audiences and immerse himself in rock music, formed the Prophets with garage rock group J.C. and the Boys. J.C. and the Boys (J.C. stood for Jesus Christ for an ironic play on the group's religious community) was established in 1965, and featured members Rod Haywood (bass guitar), Bill Powell (drums), Dan Hickman (rhythm guitar), and Travis Ellis (tambourine). The band, renamed Leo and the Prophets, performed regularly at the Jade Room in Austin and the Living Eye club in Houston, and also toured in other states such as Arkansas and New Mexico. Much of the group's psychedelic-tinged setlist and casual attire – which both mesmerized and frustrated conservative audiences – was inspired by their contemporary the 13th Floor Elevators, who often shared the bill with Leo and the Prophets.

In April 1967, the band recorded and released the single "Tilt-a-Whirl", backed by "The Parking Meter", on Totem Records. Envisioned by Leo Ellis to be a dance-oriented song, "Tilt-a-Whirl" was banned by local radio stations for the lyric "I’ve got a feeling/banana peeling/and the monkey’s showing through", which made an underlining reference to recreational drug use. The lack of publicity by pop radio stations ironically served to boost record sales and audiences at Leo and the Prophet's live performances hoping to hear the banned song.

In early 1967, the band was recorded by deejays Bill Josey Sr. and Rim Kelley, just as the two were establishing their record label Sonobeat Records. Three original instrumentals, "Ozone Forest", "Prophecy of Love", and "Flowers on the Hill", were partially complete. However, no further recording sessions were scheduled for unknown reasons. Nonetheless, Kelley began promoting "Tilt-a-Whirl" on KAZZ-FM radio in the latter half of 1967 and "Flowers on the Hill" has since become accessible. Unexpectedly, Leo Ellis at an important gig in the New Orleans club, had a breakdown on stage and abruptly left before the band's performance concluded. Leo and the Prophets disbanded soon after.

Although short-lived, the group has since been recognized for their lone single on multiple compilation albums. The band appears on albums such as Pebbles, Volume 10, Flashbacks, Volume 4, Highs in the Mid-Sixties, Volume 12, and Wyld Sides, Volume 5.

== Members ==
- Leo Ellis – Lead guitar, vocals
- Rod Haywood – Bass guitar
- Bill Powell – Drums
- Dan Hickman – Rhythm guitar
- Travis Ellis – Tambourine

== Discography ==
- "Tilt-a-Whirl" b/w "Parking Meter" – Totem Records ( T-105-45), 1967
