= Pebbles, Volume 11: Northern California =

Compilation album
- Released: April 24, 2007
- Recorded: 1965–1969
- Genre: Psychedelic rock; garage rock
- Length: 53:20
- Label: AIP

chronology
Pebbles, Volume 10 (1996)	Pebbles, Volume 11: Northern California (2007)	Pebbles, Volume 12: The World (1999)

Pebbles, Volume 11: Northern California is a compilation album featuring American underground psychedelic and garage rock music artists from Northern California that were active during the mid to late-1960s. It is a compact disc installment of the Pebbles series and was released on AIP Records, on April 24, 2007 (see 2007 in music).

Musically, the group's featured on the album were heavily influenced by the Beatles, the Rolling Stones, the Animals, and the Byrds, among others. Particularly, the bands represent the progression of musical artists through the folk rock movement in the region. Among the highlights on the album, include Peter Wheat and the Breadmen's distorted guitar melody on "All the Time". The Soulton's "Rain Down Soul" draws conclusive parallels to the Animals' hit song, "House of the Rising Sun". Additionally, Sound 70 recording of Bob Dylan's "One Too Many" has a unique combination of folk rock and blues.

Pebbles, Volume 11: Northern California is arguably the rarest piece of the Pebbles collection. Soon after its release, the album was pulled from being stocked due to undisclosed legal disputes. The album, for that reason, was not released after Pebbles, Volume 10. Nonetheless, liner notes incorrectly state the album was released in 1996, 11 years removed from the actual date.

== Track listing ==
1. Peter Wheat and the Breadmen: "All the Time"
2. The Trolls: "Walkin' Shoes"
3. Barry Carlos and the Night Caps: "Don't You Know"
4. Boys Blues: "Living Child"
5. Rock Shop: "Is That Your Halo"
6. Sound 70: "One Too Many Mornings"
7. Bethlehem Exit: "Blues Concerning My Girl"
8. Druids: "Sorry's Not Enough"
9. Crystal Garden: "Peach Fuzz Forest"
10. The Soultons: "Rain Down Soul"
11. Family Tree: "Prince of Dreams"
12. Fourth Street Exit: "Strange One"
13. The Big Timers: "Hangin' High"
14. The Cave Dwellers: "Meditation"
15. Bedpost Oracle: "Love Isn't Dead"
16. Just Six: "You"
17. The Other Side: "Streetcar"
18. Uncle Ben and Wild Rice: "Sinner "
19. Gerry and Leslie: "Me Love, Am Gone"
20. The Stepping Stones: "Pills"
