= The Tidal Waves =

American garage rock band

Background information
- Origin: Roseville, Michigan, United States
- Genres: Garage rock
- Years active: 1964–1967
- Labels: SVR/Hanna-Barbera
- Past members: Tom Wearing; Mark Karpinski; Vic Witowski; Bob Slap; Jon Wearing; Dennis Mills; Bill Long

The Tidal Waves were an American garage rock band formed in Roseville, Michigan, in 1964. Despite the young ages of the group members, the Tidal Waves were one of the more accomplished musical acts in the bustling Michigan garage band scene. They are best remembered for their regional hit, a cover version of "Farmer John", which managed to reach the Top 10 of several radio station charts around Detroit.

Inspired by the Beatles' momentous appearance on The Ed Sullivan Show in February 1964, high school students Tom Wearing (drums, vocals), Mark Karpinski (lead guitar, vocals), and Vic Witkowski (rhythm guitar, vocals) formed the Tidal Waves. Early on, the group performed at local teen dances, high schools, and battle of the bands. In 1965, two additions were made to complete the lineup: Bob Slap (bass guitar, vocals) and Jon Wearing (percussion, vocals). As their popularity grew, the group performed alongside their Michigan contemporaries the Unrelated Segments, MC5, and SRC, among others.

Tom and Jon Wearing arranged an audition with record producer John Chekaway, a relative of the two band members. Chekaway was impressed by the Tidal Waves and signed the group to his Detroit-based record label, SVR Records. The Tidal Waves raised the $200 required to record at the United Sound Systems Studios on January 7, 1966, cutting a cover version of Don and Dewey's tune, "Farmer John", and the original song by Witkowski, "She Left Me All Alone", on a Scully 4-track for their debut single. The records were co-produced by Chekaway and Richard Cioffari. Originally, 1,000 copies of "Farmer John" were pressed, and charted in several Michigan radio station charts, including number five on WXYZ, number six on WKNR, and number one on WTRX. Chekaway could not afford to keep issuing more copies of the single, so he signed the Tidal Waves' recording contract over to Hanna-Barbera Records, who distributed 50,000 copies of "Farmer John" across the US and the UK. It managed to reach number 79 on Cashbox.

Dennis Mills replaced Slap on bass, and penned the group's second single, the Zombies-influenced "I Don't Need Love". Released in September 1966, the tune included complex arrangements performed by the Detroit Symphony Orchestra, and reached number 19 on WKNR Radio thanks to DJ Paul Cannon promoting it as his "Song of the Week". The Tidal Waves' popularity grew to a degree that they began touring nationally with the Animals and the Dave Clark Five, while appearing on numerous regional television programs. However, for the group's third and final single, "Actions (Speaker Louder Than Words)"—often credited as their most artistically accomplished recording—they were almost completely unsupported by Hanna-Barbera, as the company was transitioning away from promoting music releases. In early 1967, the Tidal Waves disbanded after issues regarding the group's royalties from their record sales.

They are not to be confused with the South African band of the same name.
