= The Blue Things =

American rock band (1964–1968)

- Origin: Hays, Kansas
- Genres: Folk rock; Psychedelic
- Years active: 1964-1968
- Label: RCA
- Past members: Mike Chapman; Val Stoecklein; Richard Scott; Rick "Laz" Larzalere; Bobby Day

The Blue Things (also known as The Bluethings) were a folk rock and, later, psychedelic band from Hays, Kansas, that existed from 1964 to 1968, recording one LP and several singles for RCA Records in '66 and '67. The RCA recordings remain their best-known material, although they had previously released singles through Ruff Records, a tiny Texas label.

== Beginnings ==
The Blue Things formed as The Blue Boys at Fort Hays State College, from the remnants of a Hays R&B band, the Barons. From the Barons came Mike Chapman (lead guitar and vocals), Richard Scott (bassist and vocalist) and Rick "Laz" Larzalere (drums and vocals). Chapman had previously performed with Pat and Lolly Vegas, while Scott was a former member of the Flippers (later known as The Fabulous Flippers). With a summer tour booked, the trio decided they needed a fourth member, and soon found a lead singer and rhythm guitarist in Chapman's roommate, Val Stöecklein. Stöecklein had previously released an album with a college folk group, the Impromptwos (in which he was featured on lead vocals), and cut a demo of two original compositions ("Desert Wind" and "Nancy Whiskey") with another group, the Hi-Plains Singers. At the time, Stöecklein had been singing folk music around the college, successfully auditioning for the band in May 1964.

On their ensuing summer tour, the band hired Jim Reardon as manager, who in turn got the band signed with John Brown's Mid-Continent Co. booking agency. Reardon used what was left of his old sweatshirt business to manufacture Blue Boys sweatshirts, in addition to starting a fan club, complete with membership cards. Keeping true to their name, the Blue Boys wore matching blue suits and played blue guitars. The group reportedly earned fees as large as $1200 for playing colleges and high schools throughout Kansas, Nebraska and Colorado.

Although their live set was mostly Top 40 and British Invasion covers, Stöecklein, Scott and Chapman began composing songs for the band to record, which they did in the fall of '64. At Damon Recording Studios in Kansas City, the Blue Boys demoed five Stöecklein originals and two covers – Dale Hawkins' "La Do Da Da" (which was later re-cut for their RCA album) and Buddy Holly's "Love's Made a Fool of You". Several of these demos have since surfaced on Cicadelic Records' and Collectables Records' "The Blue Things Story" series. The demos attracted Texas' Ruff Records, who subsequently signed the group.

== From the "Blue Boys" to the "Blue Things" ==
In December 1964, the Blue Boys cut their first single for Ruff at Gene Sullivan's studio in Oklahoma City: Ronnie Hawkins "Mary Lou" and Val's own "Your Turn to Cry." However, by the time of the single's February 1965 release, the Blue Boys had become the Blue Things, in order to avoid confusion (and possible legal wrangles) with the late Jim Reeves' backing group. The single charted in the Top 40 in Oklahoma City, thanks to 50,000 watt radio station KOMA, whose publicity of the group would subsequently help the band sign with RCA.

Their next single, "Pretty Things-Oh" b/w "Just Two Days Ago", was cut in Texas, and once again was a hit in the Midwest. After recording another six-song demo in Texas (this time with only two Stöecklein and one Scott originals), the band left Ruff Records over a royalty dispute. (They reportedly received no royalties from either of their singles, but this did not stop Stöecklein from working with Ruff's Ray Ruff later in his solo career.)

At this point, John Brown managed to get the Blue Things a deal with RCA. Before they could record for RCA, drummer Rick Larzalere left the band to focus on school. After several unsuccessful replacements, Bobby Day from Salina, Kansas, was chosen.

== RCA (1965–1967) ==
The Blue Things' first RCA single, "I Must Be Doing Something Wrong" (written by the three remaining band members) b/w a remake of "La Do Da Da", was released in October 1965. A session drummer was used for the single sessions (in Nashville), as Larzalere had left and Day had yet to join. Ray Walker, the bass singer from Elvis Presley's backing group The Jordanaires, was used by producer Felton Jarvis to augment the group's vocal sound on "I Must Be Doing Something Wrong", and was the only non-Bluething vocal ever recorded. Once again, the single charted locally, but failed to chart outside of the Midwest.

The following single, while repeating the chart action of the band's previous RCA single, at least gained the band some notoriety. The A-side, "Doll House", sympathetically told the story of a prostitute, and criticized the role of brothels in society. Although it was a bold statement at the time, the single struggled after TIME magazine did a feature on supposedly obscene lyrics in rock music, citing "Doll House" as an example. The B-side, "Man on the Street", took a similar social-critique theme. While the two sides were wholly representative of the Blue Things' now fully formed "folk-rock" sound ("Doll House" remaining one of their signature tunes), both songs were from outside sources: "Doll House" was penned by little-known country songwriter Marge Barton, and "Man on the Street" by equally obscure rockabilly artist Ronnie Self.

The LP "Listen and See" was released shortly after the Doll House single from June 1966. While this album was popular with Blue Things fans, by the time it came out the band had moved past the folk rock/Merseybeat sound that RCA favored, to a more psychedelic sound. Their January 1967 Nashville session – the last with Val Stöecklein – produced the psychedelic single "Orange Rooftop Of Your Mind" b/w "One Hour Cleaners". Both sides were written by Stöecklein & Chapman, with Scott helping write "One Hour Cleaners". Bobby Day's backward countdown on "One Hour Cleaners" is his only recorded vocal. In May 1967, Stöecklein left for a solo career, signed with Dot Records and released the album "Grey Life" in 1968. The remaining Blue Things moved to California and continued to perform concerts, also signing with Dot Records and touring for 14 months before disbanding entirely. In 1971, Stöecklein co-wrote a double-LP biblical rock opera, Truth Of Truths, with producer Ray Ruff and former Them bassist Alan Henderson, which featured "Orange Rooftops Of Your Mind" re-recorded with new lyrics as "John the Baptist".

The Blue Things have never held a reunion concert. A collection of their song catalog was released on CD in 1995 and a reissue of their 1966 album on CD was released by BMG in 2001. Stöecklein died in 1993 in Kansas. Chapman and Day have continued to write and perform, while Day owns a cabinet company in Kansas.
