= The Outcasts (Texas band) =

American garage rock band

Background information
- Origin: San Antonio, Texas, United States
- Genres: Garage rock; psychedelic; proto-punk
- Years active: 1963–1968
- Labels: Outcast Records; Askel Records; Gallant Records
- Past members: Buddy Carson; Rickey Wright; Denny Turner; Jim Carsten; Jim Ryan; Galen Niles

The Outcasts are an American garage rock band from San Antonio, Texas that released a total of five singles between 1965 and 1967. Their best-known songs are "I'm in Pittsburgh (And it's Raining)", and "1523 Blair". Their recordings have been reissued on a number of compilation albums. According to the Ugly Things compilation album notes, they are the most recognized band of this name that were active in the mid-1960s, including another popular band from Manhasset, New York (see below for others).

== Early history ==
The Outcasts were formed in San Antonio in late 1963 by Buddy Carson, Rickey Wright and Denny Turner. In late 1964, Jim Carsten and then Jim Ryan joined the band. This line-up prevailed until the band's fifth single, when Galen Niles replaced Denny Turner on guitar. In 1964, Denny designed a logo and slogan for the band, "Music from the OUTER LIMITS", taken from the name of the popular science-fiction television series of the period, The Outer Limits. The band had the logo emblazoned on the backs of their uniforms and also issued business cards with a similar design.

Early direction for the band came from Mike Post, whose many later musical credits include producing the first three albums for The First Edition and creating the theme music for Law & Order, The Rockford Files, Hill Street Blues and many other television series. Post was the songwriter and producer of the band's first single. He also recruited the Outcasts as the back-up band for a performance by Jimmy Carlson (who was active in the New York folk music scene) and Jimmy Hawkins (who later worked in Elvis Presley films and on The Donna Reed Show).

== Career ==
According to member Denny Turner, they had all of the trappings of a successful rock band: a succession of managers (Sally Senter and Major John Carson), go-go dancers, a fan club with a regular newsletter, and adoring fans. Their performances at area military clubs led to gigs as opening act for Herman's Hermits in San Antonio and Austin. In 1965, The Outcasts were even invited to appear in Houston, Texas with The Beatles. but turned down the opportunity; the Five Americans took their place at the concert.

Ticket for an Outcasts show w/ 13th Floor Elevators

In May 1966, they shared a bill with the 13th Floor Elevators (ticket pictured) and also appeared at Texas Teen Fairs and other venues with such popular acts as Lou Christie, Gerry and the Pacemakers, Peter and Gordon and The Rolling Stones.

The Outcasts regularly participated in Battle of the Bands competitions, usually placing first or second; in 1966, the band won the competition statewide, at the peak of garage rock fervor, beating the large number of bands that were then active in Texas. (No other state is so heavily collected today in compilation albums of garage rock and psychedelic rock music; as one example, the landmark Highs in the Mid-Sixties series devotes five of their twenty-three volumes to bands from Texas.)

== Break-up and further activities ==
The band dissolved in 1968; founding member Buddy Carson died of complications of hepatitis that same year.

- Denny Turner continues to write and record music, and he also sells and repairs vintage guitars for his store called Denny's Guitars, based in northern Oahu, Hawaii. He is also a multi-media artist and music teacher and has a home recording studio.
- Jim Ryan is a public school music teacher in San Antonio who owns and manages Braindance Ink, a multi-lingual music production company specializing in the creation of songs, dances and games based on folk music for music education classes.
- Galen Niles was the guitarist in two well-regarded Texas hard rock bands, Homer and Ultra during the 1970s and is still active in music. The Ultra tracks were reissued on Monster Records in 2000 and on Vintage Records in 2010; while the Homer album was released on Gear Fab Records in 2012.
- Jim Carsten went into law enforcement and was once a county sheriff; he is now a security consultant.
- Rickey Wright died in an automobile accident in 2000.

== Other bands named the Outcasts ==
"The Outcasts", with various spelling variants, has been a fairly common name for rock bands for many years; at least 10 bands were using this name during the mid-1960s. This has led to some confusion among these varied groups.

One common misconception has to do with the 1960s band The Outcasts from Manhasset, New York, whose recordings were reissued by the same Cicadelic/Collectables label, even before they featured the Texas band. In the mid-1980s, Cicadelic Records released three archival albums by the New York group: Meet the Outcasts! (studio recordings, mostly previously unreleased), The Battle of the Bands Live! (split release) and Live! Standing Room Only (a 1967 concert). In 1993, Collectables reissued both albums on CD, with additional songs that include "Society's Child" and "Get It On". Popular recordings (reissued on compilations) of this band are "Don't Press Your Luck", "I Didn't Have to Love Her Anymore", "Nothing But Love", "Set Me Free" and their unique versions of "Walk On By" and "Gloria".

Another band called the Outcasts recorded several tracks backing Linda Pierre King, an artist featured on a compilation of female garage rock artists from Texas, We Had the Beat / The Heartbeats & Other Texas Girls of the 60s. That album's liner notes suggested that the San Antonio band had backed her on these songs, a natural mistake, since King is from Houston, and the record label that released the final single by the Outcasts, Gallant Records, was based there.

== Songs ==
The 1995 retrospective I'm in Pittsburgh and It's Raining (15 tracks, all the band's music on the Collectables label) omits the band's first single, Nothing Ever Comes Easy b/w Oriental Express; according to the CD's brief liner notes, it was "not up-to-par with their subsequent releases." Since neither side has yet been issued on a compilation album, we have only band member Jim Ryan's description: the first is "a very tender, yearning ballad with some nice changes and arrangement by a talented composer [Mike Post]. The B-side [is] a surf instrumental that rocked in fifths to give that Asian sound."

=== I'm in Pittsburgh (And it's Raining) ===
I'm in Pittsburgh and It's Raining

I'm in Pittsburgh (And it's Raining) embodied much of the innocence and charm of garage rock, as well as the less-than-slick production common of the 1960s garage sound. This was the band's most successful single, receiving national airplay and charting locally in San Antonio and also in Houston and Austin, Texas. It was released in 1995 as a retrospective album in CD format, released by Collectables Records as #COL-CD-0591.

The opening lyrics – I'm in Pittsburgh and it's rainin' / I'm sittin' in the subway here complainin' – contain an error of fact (Pittsburgh does not have a subway system), which cooled off the initial rush of record sales in that city. The title lyric was taken from Mountain's first lines of dialogue in the Rod Serling teleplay Requiem for a Heavyweight, the theatrical film version of which had been released three years before the song was composed. This track was included in the first of the Pebbles compilation albums, where the original liner notes call this song a "blistering punk-rocker, which has been compared to the Pretty Things at their best."

The 1995 album contains the music on four of their five singles, plus two versions of "Smokestack Lightning" and a rehearsal session of "I'm in Pittsburgh (And It's Raining)", their best known song. There are also six recordings that were not released on their singles; according to the liner notes, this material dates from the time of the last single, when the band had moved to Gallant Records of Houston. However, the first single is not included, nor are both versions of "Everyday", which was used in two versions as the flip side of the last two singles. It included:

1. I'm in Pittsburgh (And It's Raining)
2. Smokestack Lightning
3. Route 66
4. Sweet Mary
5. I'll Set You Free
6. Everyday
7. What Price Victory?
8. My Love
9. My Generation
10. Smokestack Lightning single version
11. 1523 Blair
12. Season of the Witch
13. Come on Over
14. The Birds
15. I'm in Pittsburgh (And It's Raining) early rehearsal

Numerous bands have released covers of this song over the years. Perhaps best known is the 1990 cover by The Cynics, from Pittsburgh; others have been recorded by the Flies, the Vibes and the Go-Devils. The original version of the song was re-pressed in 1977 as a bootleg recording in Amsterdam, and marketed to new wave fans, with the band name changed to the Kicks.

=== 1523 Blair ===
The band's last single, 1523 Blair features a "wind-up" introduction, followed by guitar riffs played at a furious pace, then barely intelligible lyrics, all at a blistering tempo. (The title was taken from the address of the Doyle Jones recording studio in Houston.) One recent reviewer remarked, "The music on this selection is jarringly experimental, the spirit is possessed fervor. '1523 Blair' is one minute and forty seven seconds long because it couldn’t have possibly been any longer". This song inspired the name of a British psychedelic rock band, Blair 1523 (Bomp! Records released their lone album in 1993, after the band had already broken up).

=== Others ===
The Outcasts tried their hand at many styles, from protest songs ("Price of Victory"), blues ("Sweet Mary"), to instrumentals ("Come on Over" and "The Birds") and romantic ballads ("I'll Set You Free" and "Everyday"). The Outcasts also recorded covers, notably "Smokestack Lightning" and "Route 66".

== Band members ==
- Denny Turner, lead guitar, autoharp
- Buddy Carson, keyboards, harmonica, percussion, vocals
- Rickey Wright, drums
- Jim Carsten, rhythm guitar, vocals
- Jim Ryan, bass guitar, vocals
- Galen Niles, lead guitar (replacing Denny Turner for the final single)

== Discography ==
=== Retrospective albums ===
(the band's main reissue label was Cicadelic, later Collectables)

- Music from... the Outer Limits! Texas Punk Vol. 2; Cicadelic, 1984; 6 tracks, split-LP with The Esquires
- Texas Punk Vol. 3 - The Sights and Sounds of an Era; Cicadelic, 1984; 4 tracks, plus various artists
- I'm in Pittsburgh and It's Raining; Collectables Records (#COL-0591); 1995 release on CD, 15 tracks

=== Singles ===
- "Nothing Ever Comes Easy" b/w "Oriental Express"; Outcast Records
- "I'm in Pittsburgh (And it's Raining)" b/w "Price of Victory"; Askel Records
- "I'll Set You Free" b/w "Everyday"; Askel Records
- "Route 66" b/w "Everyday"; Askel Records – Alternate version of "B" side
- "1523 Blair" b/w "Smokestack Lightning"; Gallant Records

=== Compilation albums ===
Song	Year	Album	Type	Ref
"1523 Blair"	1979	Acid Dreams	LP/CD	
"1523 Blair"	1982	Texas Punk Groups From the Sixties, Volume 1	LP	
"1523 Blair"	1986	Mayhem & Psychosis, Volume 2	LP	
"1523 Blair"	1991	Sixties Archives, Volume 2	CD	
"1523 Blair"	1993	Songs We Taught the Fuzztones	LP/CD	
"1523 Blair"	1998	Ya Gotta Have Moxie!, Volume 1	CD	
"1523 Blair"	1998	Teenage Shutdown! I'm a No-Count	LP/CD	
"The Birds"	1984	Texas Punk: 1966, Volume 2	LP	
"The Birds"	1993	Acid Visions - The Complete Collection, Volume 2	CD	
"The Birds"	2002	Acid Visions, Volume 6	CD	
"Everyday"	1984	Texas Punk, Volume 3	LP	
"Everyday"	1993	Acid Visions - The Complete Collection, Volume 2	CD	
"I’ll Set You Free"	1966	Texas Punk: 1966, Volume 2	LP	
"I’ll Set You Free"	1993	Acid Visions - The Complete Collection, Volume 2	CD	
"I’m in Pittsburgh (And it’s Raining)"	1978	Pebbles, Volume 1	LP	
"I’m in Pittsburgh (And it’s Raining)"	1980	Flashback, Volume 2	LP	
"I’m in Pittsburgh (And it’s Raining)"	1984	Texas Punk: 1966, Volume 2	LP	
"I’m in Pittsburgh (And it’s Raining)"	1986	Texas Flashbacks, Volume 2	CD	
"I’m in Pittsburgh (And it’s Raining)"	1993	Acid Visions - The Complete Collection, Volume 2	CD	
"I’m in Pittsburgh (And it’s Raining)"	1998	Green Crystal Ties, Volume 8	CD	
"I’m in Pittsburgh (And it’s Raining)"	2002	Acid Visions, Volume 6	CD	
"I’m in Pittsburgh (And it’s Raining)"	2005	Uptight Tonight	CD	
"I’m in Pittsburgh (And it’s Raining)"	2007	Garage Beat '66, Volume 7	CD	
"My Love"	1984	Texas Punk, Volume 3	LP	
"My Love"	1993	Acid Visions - The Complete Collection, Volume 2	CD	
"My Love"	2002	Acid Visions, Volume 6	CD	
"Route 66"	1984	Texas Punk: 1966, Volume 2	LP	
"Route 66"	1993	Acid Visions - The Complete Collection, Volume 2	CD	
"Route 66"	1998	Green Crystal Ties, Volume 8	CD	
"Route 66"	2002	Acid Visions, Volume 6	CD	
"Smokestack Lightning"	n.d.	Endless Journey	CD	
"Smokestack Lightning"	1982	Texas Punk Groups From the Sixties, Volume 1	LP	
"Smokestack Lightning"	1982	Endless Journey Phase 1	LP	
"Smokestack Lightning"	1984	Texas Punk: 1966, Volume 2	LP	
"Smokestack Lightning"	1991	Sixties Archives, Volume 2	CD	
"Smokestack Lightning"	1993	Acid Visions - The Complete Collection, Volume 2	CD	
"Sweet Mary"	1984	Texas Punk: 1966, Volume 2	LP	
"Sweet Mary"	1993	Acid Visions - The Complete Collection, Volume 2	CD	
"What Price Victory?"	1984	Texas Punk, Volume 3	LP	
"What Price Victory?"	1993	Acid Visions - The Complete Collection, Volume 2	CD	
