= The Lemon Fog =

American garage/psychedelic rock band

Background information
- Origin: Houston, Texas, United States
- Genres: Garage rock; psychedelic rock; folk rock
- Years active: 1965-1970
- Labels: Orbit

The Lemon Fog were an American garage rock/psychedelic rock band from Houston, Texas who were active from 1965–1970. They were one of the earliest bands to emerge from the Houston psychedelic scene, and recorded several singles for Orbit Records. The group also recorded a handful of outtakes and demos which, along with their issued singles, have been released on the anthology The Psychedelic Sound Of Summer With The Lemon Fog.

== History ==
The Lemon Fog's roots harken back to the Rip Chords, a surf rock combo in Houston Texas, which was founded in the spring of 1963 by Fillmore High School classmates Danny Ogg and Terry Horde, with Ogg on lead guitar, Horde on rhythm guitar, Timmy Thorpe on bass, Bill Simons as lead vocals, and Dale VanDeloo on saxophone and vocals. Though their early repertoire consisted of primarily instrumental numbers, they played occasional pop-soul vocal songs a well. The group played at small venues such as coffee bars and a sock hops but broke up when saxophonist VanDeloo supposedly attacked Ogg with a mike stand during an argument.

Chris Lyons was auditioning musicians at Clem's Music in Houston for a new band he was forming. Danny Ogg showed up at the store, and Lyons asked him to join the new group, the Pla-Boys. Ogg agreed on condition that the Rip Chords' former bassist Timmy Thorpe, who had just gotten laid off from work, be allowed to join. The Pla-boys performed their first gig at St. Regis College for the Arts. It was there that Ted Eubanks, an avant-garde composer in Houston's mod scene, caught their act, which consisted primarily of covers of such garage acts as Sam the Sham and the Pharaohs. He approached them after the show. Though Eubanks recognized their talent, he expressed to them that they needed to make changes in their repertoire and adopt a more contemporary image. The band took his suggestions, and began adding original numbers into their set-lists. Eubanks changed their image from clean-cut, matching suits to a more mod and bohemian attire. In a matter of weeks in 1965, they went from being the Pla-Boys to The Lemon Fog, who quickly became recognized as one of the more formidable bands in Houston. Despite Danny Oggs' initial insistence of Thorpe's inclusion, he was eventually dropped on bass. Oggs switched from guitar to bass.

They won a local battle of the bands, and, with help from producer-songwriter Jimmy Duncan, they became the first band signed to the newly founded Orbit label. Only three singles were issued by the group on Orbit, although they recorded hours of demos under Eubanks' direction, who along with Duncan handled most of the songwriting. "The Living Eye Theme," also known as "The Lemon Fog," reached number eight on the regional and local charts in the Houston area. The group became a major draw in the Houston vicinity and made several television appearances to promote their singles.

They were one of the earliest bands to emerge from the Houston psychedelic scene along with acts such as the Dadaistic Red Crayola and the Mighty Nomads, as their approach began to advance beyond a basic garage band sound, while retaining some of its elements but embracing other influences such as the folk rock of acts such as the Byrds, resulting in a new "lysergic folk." Their lyrics took on an obliquely topical dimension, expressing alienation and frustration with the American dream, while reaching beyond the normal perceptions of parameters of logic and time, into the realm of the unknown. In 1967 they released the single "Echoes of Time" b/w "Lemon Fog" and in 1968 followed up with "Summer" b/w "Girl From the Wrong Side of Town," both on Orbit Records.

Personality and ego conflicts, as well as drug abuse, would eventually hasten the demise of the band. In 1970, the group broke up. In 2011, Cicadelic Records released a compilation of the band's entire recorded output entitled, The Psychedelic Sound Of Summer With The Lemon Fog, which includes singles, outtakes and demos.

== Discography ==
- "Echoes of Time" b/w "Lemon Fog" (Orbit 1117, rel. 1967)
- "Summer" b/w "Girl From the Wrong Side of Town" (Orbit 1123, rel. 1968)
