= The Lemon Drops =

American psychedelic pop band

- Origin: Chicago, Illinois, United States
- Genres: Psychedelic pop; folk rock
- Years active: 1966 - 1969
- Labels: Rembrandt
- Past members: Danny Smola; Eddy Weiss; Gary Weiss; Jeff Brand; George Sorrenson; Bobby Lunak; Rick Ericksen; Dick Sidman

The Lemon Drops were an American psychedelic pop band from Chicago, Illinois that formed in 1966. The band, originally established by high school students, produced one single in their heyday that achieved regional success. The Lemon Drops also recorded other unreleased material that led to a renewal of interest in the group in the 1980s. The band was essential in the development of psychedelic pop in Illinois.

== History ==
In 1966, McHenry High School students Danny Smola (lead vocals), Eddy Weiss (rhythm guitar), Gary Weiss (drums), Jeff Brand (bass guitar), George Sorrenson and Rick Ericksen (lead guitar), and Bobby Lunak (acoustic guitar) formed The Lemon Drops in the midst of the developing Chicago music scene. The band gained a local following in the area as they constructed their own individual sound. By the end of the year Reggie Weiss (brother of Eddy and Gary) formed his own recording company called Rembrandt Records. Upon hearing the band in rehearsal, Reggie Weiss signed the band to record at RCA Studios in Southern Illinois.

Reggie Weiss wrote and produced the band's debut single, A-side "I Live in the Springtime" backed with "Listen Girl." Sorrenson left the band a few days before recording, so Rick Ericksen was the guitarist for the May 11, 1967 session who also wrote the music for "Sometime Ago" which was originally called "Alone" when originally written by Rick. Five hundred pressings of the record were released, but recalled when Reggie Weiss discovered the drum track had not been included. Copies of the drumless version remained in circulation, and it even made an appearance on the 1998 reissue of the Nuggets compilation. A second pressing of 1,000 copies, featuring the drums, was released and quickly sold out. Chicago AM radio station WLS wanted to distribute more copies, but Reggie Weiss could not afford to press more, so the single did not reach the charts nationally. The Lemon Drops gained notoriety from their debut, and performed all across Illinois.

Ahead of their next single, the band re-established themselves as a psychedelic band. To bolster their new sound, the band hired Dick Sidman as their lead singer. From October to December 1967, the band recorded numerous demos and caught the attention of RCA Records. As Reggie Weiss recalled, "RCA was more interested in the $1,200 bill we ran up and I didn't have the money to pay for the sessions."

In 1968, in an effort to interest a record label, the band recorded two live albums at the Weiss home. Uni Records appeared to show interest, but the band declined after considering the offered terms to be unfavorable to them. As the band continued its search for a record deal, they performed live and continued recording, as they still held a following in Chicago. The Buena Vista label also expressed interest, but before the band could complete a deal, the owner unexpectedly died and the company folded. One final attempt was dashed when the band was involved in an acid party on the night before contract signing. The Lemon Drops disbanded in the summer of 1969 as a result.

Reggie Weiss managed several other bands, which performed the Lemon Drops' songs and achieved substantial airplay with them in Illinois. Interest in the band was rekindled during the psychedelic revival of the mid-to-late 1980s. In 1985, the band received an official album release with Crystal Pure, and a follow-up a year later called Second Album! The albums included nearly all of the band's home recordings and the demos produced at RCA Studios.
