= Woodrich Records =

Woodrich Records was an American record label based in Rogersville and Lexington, Alabama in the early 1960s. It was owned by Woody Richardson, who did most of the recording in his home studio, which was in an old farmhouse outside the Lexington city limits through the early Sixties. As Woodrich Records grew, Richardson built a new building in the center of Lexington. In the early years of Woodrich, many of the artists who recorded and released albums with the label laid down their tracks at a rented studio in Nashville, Tennessee, since the home studio had no heat. The labels were blue with silver print.

== Albums ==
The Concerts - Oh What a Savior

- (ARP 8757 / 8758) unknown release date

Producer - Woody Richardson
Engineer - Ken Beavers
Recorded at Woodrich Studio Lexington, Alabama

Side 1
Oh What a Savior
I'm Gonna Make It
Ten Thousand Years
Shoutin Sounds
I Saw the Light

Side 2
What do you Think About Jesus
I Should Have Been Crucified
The Flowers Kissed the Shoes that Jesus Wore
I'm His and He's Mine
Almost Home

== Singles ==
Buddy Hughey & His Buddies

- (WR 1234) I've Got Plenty Of Lovin/I Got A Pretty Little Girlie - 1960

Patsy Penn

- (WR 1239) There's A Big Blue Cloud/?
- (WR 1240) I Don't Want Your Kisses/Even The Windows Have Pains (Panes)

Percy Boone

- (WR 1248) Look Unto The Hills / Let Thy Will Be Done

Wayne Pope & Lonnie Roberts And The Happy Valley Boys

- (WR 1266) Can You Pray For Your Son In Vietnam/Mother's Prayer

Aaron & Sue Wilburn

- (WR 1270) The Greatest Man Who Ever Lived/Daddy, Come On In

Bobby Rodgers and the Blu Boys

- (WR 1301) These Are The Times That Try Men's Souls/This House of Loneliness

Ray Cottles and the Swangers/Lamar McAnally and the Mountaineers

- (WR 1302) Songs My Daddy Sang/The Ballad Of An Old Oak Tree

The Campbell Trio

- (WR 1500) Laura Dee/The Blues My Baby Gave To Me

William Smiley & The Friendly Folks

- (10662) Waldo City/Let's Stand on the True Foundation

The Shadows

- (WR18507) If You Love Me
- (WR18508) The Big Mess

Malcolm "Hi Pockets" Miller

- Susie's Poodle Dog/Them Dad Burned Long Handles

Gerald Yeager and His Tennessee Rhythm Boys

- (WR 1237) Cry, Cry, Big Man/My Heart Won't Let You Go

== See also ==
- List of record labels
