= Pebbles, Volume 10 (1980 album) =

Compilation album
- Released: 1980
- Recorded: Mid-1960s
- Genres: Garage rock, psychedelic rock
- Labels: BFD; AIP

chronology
| Pebbles, Volume 9 (LP) | Pebbles, Volume 10 | Pebbles, Volume 11 (LP) |

Pebbles, Volume 10 is a compilation album among the LPs in the Pebbles series. The music on this album has no relation to Pebbles, Volume 10 that was released on CD many years later.

== Release data ==
This album was the last of the Pebbles LP's to be released by BFD Records (as #BFD-5027), in 1980. The LP was kept in print for many years by AIP Records.

== Notes on the tracks ==
The Five Americans are known for their hit song "Western Union". The Ides of March had a quite different hit song several years after this track was recorded called "Vehicle" (referred to on the liner notes of this album as a "horn dirge"). The marvelous cover of "The Train Kept A-Rollin'" by Steve Walker & the Bold is played much faster than most other recordings of this classic. The same band, but this time called The Bold is also included in Pebbles, Volume 9. The Ugly Ducklings are one of several Canadian bands whose songs are sprinkled on the albums in the Pebbles series. "Primitive" was covered by the Cramps and is included on the Nuggets box set as well as the Born Bad series (Songs the Cramps Taught Us). Gary Duncan and Greg Elmore of the Brogues later became members of Quicksilver Messenger Service. Guitarist Bob Webber of the Moonrakers founded Sugarloaf with Jerry Corbetta, who brought in drummer Robert MacVittie and rhythm guitarist Veeder Van Dorn III from this band as well.

== Track listing ==
Side 1:

1. The Next Five: "Talk to Me Girl"
2. The Moon Rakers: "You'll Come Back"
3. Peter Wheat and the Breadmen: "Baby What's New"
4. The Marauders: "Since I Met You"
5. The Ides of March: "Roller Coaster"
6. The Foggy Notions: "Need a Little Lovin'"
7. The Ugly Ducklings: "Just in Case You're Wondering"
8. Raga and the Talas: "My Group and Me"

Side 2:

1. Leo and the Prophets: "Tilt-a-Whirl"
2. The Human Expression: "Love at Psychedelic Velocity"
3. The Wig/Wags: "I'm on My Way down the Road"
4. Steve Walker & the Bold: "The Train Kept a-Rollin'"
5. Things to Come: "I'm Not Talkin'"
6. The Five Americans: "Slippin' and Slidin'"
7. The Groupies: "Primitive"
8. The Brogues: "Don't Shoot Me Down"
