= The Liberty Bell (band) =

American rock band (1966–1969)

- 1967 promotional photo

Background information
- Origin: Corpus Christi, Texas, United States
- Genres: Garage rock; psychedelic rock; blues rock
- Years active: 1966-1969
- Labels: Cee-Bee, Back Beat
- Past members: Ronnie Tanner; Al Hunt; Richard Painter; Wayne Harrison; Carl Abey; Chris Gemiottis

The Liberty Bell was an American garage rock/psychedelic rock band from Corpus Christi, Texas who were active in the 1960s. They specialized in a blues-based brand of proto-punk influenced by British groups such as the Yardbirds. The band failed to reach wider audience in the time, but have come to the attention of garage rock collectors and enthusiasts in the intervening years since their breakup, with their work appearing on several compilations.

== History ==
The Liberty Bell was founded in Corpus Christi, Texas in 1966, and their original name was the Zulus. They specialized in a hard-driving blues-based style of rock influenced by British acts such as the Yardbirds, as their sound increasingly evolved to embrace elements of psychedelia. The band's lineup initially consisted of Al Hunt on lead guitar, Richard Painter on rhythm guitar, Wayne Harrison on bass, and Carl Abey on drums. The band signed with Carl Becker, owner of the J-Beck and Cee-Bee record labels, to manage them. The band was in need of a lead singer, so Becker enlisted the services of Ronnie Tanner who had sung with another local band the Acoustics. According to Tanner:

Carl Becker introduced himself to me and asked if I would be willing to come and audition for a band he was going to sign to his Cee-Bee record label. They were called ‘The Zulu’s’. I was asked to meet the band at the drummer Carl Aeby’s house and the audition went well. I was asked to join the group as lead singer and soon the band’s name was changed to "The Liberty Bell".

With Tanner now in the fold, they went into the recording studio and in a cluster of several sessions, they recorded all of the output that would be featured on their 1967 Cee-Bee releases. Their debut single, taken from these sessions in McAllen, Texas, was a cover of the Yardbirds' "Nazz Are Blue" b/w Willie Dixon's "Big Boss Man" and was released in May. Their next two 1967 releases were "That's How it Will Be" b/w "For What You Lack" which appeared in July, followed by "Something for Me" b/w "Al's Blues" released in October. The band also cut an acetate of "I Can See" taken from these same sessions.

In early 1968 Ronnie Tanner left the group to fight in Vietnam and was replaced by Chris Gerniottis, formerly in the Zakary Thaks, who brought along several songs with him which displayed lyrics of a more contemplative nature which aptly suited their increasing forays into psychedelia. They signed with Back Beat Records and released "Thoughts and Visions" b/w "Look for Tomorrow" in August 1968. They continued their mixture of garage and psychedelic, however they released a soul-style number, "Naw Naw Naw" in late 1968 on which only Gemiottis participated accompanied by session musicians. The Liberty Bell broke up in 1969 when Gerniottis returned to the Zakary Thaks.

In more recent years the Liberty Bell's work has come to the attention of garage rock and psychedelic collectors and enthusiasts. Two of their songs appear on volumes 5 and 7 of Sundazed Music' acclaimed Garage Beat '66 series. In 2014 their complete recordings were re-issued on the Thoughts & Visions 1967-1969 anthology.

== Membership ==
- Ronnie Tanner (Lead vocals)
- Al Hunt (lead guitar)
- Richard Painter (rhythm guitar)
- Wayne Harrison (bass)
- Carl Abey (drums)
- Chris Gemiottis (lead vocals)

== Discography ==
- "Nazz Are Blue" b/w "Big Boss Man" (Cee-Bee, 1967)
- "That's How it Will Be" b/w "For What You Lack" (Cee-Bee 1002, 1967)
- "Something for Me" b/w "Al's Blues"(Cee-Bee 1003, 1967)
- "I Can See" (Cee-Bee, unissued acetate 1967)
- "Thoughts and Visions" b/w "Look for Tomorrow" (Back Beat 595, unissued acetate 1968)
- "Recognition" b/w "Naw Naw Naw" (Backbeat 600, 1968)
