= The Penthouse 5 =

American garage rock band

- Origin: Oak Cliff, Texas, United States
- Genres: Garage rock; folk rock; psychedelic rock
- Years active: 1964-1967
- Labels: Solar, Hawk
- Past members: Walter Buchanan; Justin Brown; Steve Wood; Bill Looney; Mark Porter; Rob Graham; Jon Williams; Richard Keathley; Mike Echart; Tommy Lasoma; GaTommy DeSalvo; Gary Ivy; Mike Evans

The Penthouse 5 were an American garage rock band from Oak Cliff, Texas, a suburb of Dallas and were active from 1964-1967. The band's style was highly influenced by popular British acts like the Beatles and the Kinks, as well as the folk rock of the Byrds. In 1967 they shortened their name to the Penthouse and also began to play occasional gigs with a horn section as a soul outfit under the name of Dr. William’s Soul Emporium.

== History ==
The Penthouse 5 were formed in 1964 in Oak Cliff, Texas, a borough of Dallas, Texas, not far from where Stevie Ray Vaughan lived. Their initial moniker was the Four Barrels, named after the type of carburetor, and their original membership consisted of Walter Buchanan (vocals), Justin Brown (lead guitar), Steve Wood (rhythm guitar, keyboards, and vocals), and Bill Looney (rhythm guitar, later bass), and Mark Porter (drums). By 1965 the band had changed their name to the Penthouse 5, an idea recommended by bassist Bill Looney, to imply that they were "top of the heap." Their lead singer Water Buchanan departed, but Mark Porter introduced the band to Rob Graham, who replaced Walter on vocals. They played regular gigs at the Rocket Roller Rink, as well as teen clubs such as the Pit, the Studio Club, the 3 Thieves, the Panther Club, the Fantasmagoria, and Louann's, and won several battles of the bands including their first which as held at Broadway Skateland competing against local acts The Gentlemen and the Untouchables. After winning another contest they secured a spot on a local Channel 11 TV show, Hi-Ho-Shebang, in November 1965. The band played beyond the Dallas/Fort Worth area throughout Texas and Louisiana.

Bass player Bill Looney's father, an attorney, was the band's manager and would represent other Dallas area bands such as Kempy and the Guardians, as well as start Solar Records, the label for whom the group would record their first single, the Rob Graham-penned "Bad Girl" b/w "Don't Mess Around With My Dream," written by fellow Dallas musician Ron Price. It was recorded at Sellers Studio and Summit Studio, produced by Edwin Greines. In late 1966, singer Rob Graham was fired by Looney's father the band's manager, a decision that drove Brown and Porter out of the band's lineup as well. They were replaced by Jon Williams (vocals, keyboards, harmonica), who had played with the By Fives and the WordD, Richard "Lurch" Keathley (lead guitar, vocals), who had also been a member of the WordD and Mike Echart (drums).

The band shortened their name to the Penthouse, and recorded another half dozen records with producer Edward Greines for the Solar and Hawk labels. Their sound retained some of its prior Beatles' influence in songs such as "You're Gonna Make Me," which was previously recorded by the WordD and released as a single on the Hawk label, backed with "Don't Mess Around with My Dream," but became heavier and more serious. They also sometimes performed under the name Dr. William’s Soul Emporium as a soul group with a horn section consisting of Larry Hullett on trumpet and Scott Sanford on saxophone. Dale Hawkins, who had written "Suzie Q," worked with them as the A&R man during recording "Don't Mess Around." In late 1967, the band broke up when Steve Wood moved to California, where he came to lead a band called the New Life, and later played with The Pointer Sisters and Kenny Loggins. The rest of the group's members ceased to be active in music.

In the years since their breakup, the Penthouse 5's work has come to the attention of garage rock enthusiasts and collectors and has been included on several compilations such as The Penthouse 5 – The WordD Is Love!, released on Collectibles Records, which includes all of their recorded work, along with that of fellow Dallas cohorts, the WordD, and Texas Punk 1966 Vol.4 - Dallas Psychedelic Gold From The 60's.

== Membership ==
=== 1964-1965 ===
- Walter Buchanan (vocals)
- Justin Brown (lead guitar)
- Steve Wood (guitar, vocals, keyboards)
- Bill Looney (bass)
- Mark Porter (drums)

=== 1965-1966 ===
- Rob Graham (vocals)
- Justin Brown (lead guitar)
- Steve Wood (guitar, vocals, keyboards)
- Bill Looney (bass)
- Mark Porter (drums)

=== 1967 ===
- Jon Williams (vocals)
- Richard Keathley (guitar)
- Mike Echart (drums)
- Tommy Loama (guitar)
- Steve Wood (guitar, vocals, keyboards)
- Bill Looney (bass)
- Tommy DeSalvo (keyboards)
- Gary Ivy (guitar)
- Mike Evans (guitar)
- Scott Sanford (saxophone)
- Larry Hullet (trumpet)

== Discography ==
- "Bad Girl" b/w "In His Shadow" (Solar 421/2, June 1966)
- "You're Gonna Make Me" b/w "Don't Mess Around with My Dream" (Hawk 2-67, February 1967)
