= I Need You (The Kinks song) =

- UK B-side label

Single by the Kinks
- A-side: "Set Me Free"
- Released: 21 May 1965
- Recorded: 13–14 April 1965
- Studio: Pye, London
- Length: 2:29
- Label: Pye (UK); Reprise (US)
- Songwriter: Ray Davies
- Producer: Shel Talmy

The Kinks singles chronology
| "Ev'rybody's Gonna Be Happy" (1965) | "Set Me Free" / "I Need You" (1965) | "See My Friends" (1965) |

"I Need You" is a song by the English rock band the Kinks released on 21 May 1965 as the B-side to "Set Me Free". The song, along with "You Really Got Me" and "All Day and All of the Night", has been cited as one of the influences which shifted the focus from rock 'n' roll to hard-hitting rock music. Never a part of the Kinks live act, it has since been revived live by both Davies brothers solo in the 21st century.

== Reception ==
Pitchfork described the song "I Need You" as "punky" and "still thrilling". Rolling Stone put it in the "early ravers" in The Kinks catalogue.

The Guardian characterized it as "libidinous".

== Personnel ==
According to Doug Hinman:

The Kinks

- Ray Davies – lead vocal, rhythm guitar
- Dave Davies – backing vocal, lead guitar (Note: Hinman writes Dave also "possibly [played] doubled rhythm [guitar]" on the track.)
- Pete Quaife – bass
- Mick Avory – drums

Additional musicians

- Rasa Davies – backing vocal
