= Zakary Thaks =

American garage rock band

- Zakary Thaks in 1966

Background information
- Origin: Corpus Christi, Texas, United States
- Genres: Proto-punk; garage rock; psychedelic rock
- Years active: 1966-1970, 2005
- Labels: J-Beck, Mercury, ABC-Dunhill, Cee-Bee, Thak
- Spinoff of: The Riptides, The Marauders
- Past members: Chris Gerniottis; Pete Stinson; Rex Gregory; John Lopez; Stan Moore

The Zakary Thaks were an American garage rock band from Corpus Christi, Texas, United States, which formed in the mid-1960s.

== History ==
The band developed out of The Riptides, a teen surf group which included Chris Gerniottis (vocals), Pete Stinson (lead guitar), Wayne Harrison (bass), Shelby Jordan (rhythm guitar), and Rex Gregory (drums). The group then became The Marauders, adding lead guitarist John Lopez and David Fore on drums with Gerniottis on vocals, Gregory on bass, and Stinson on rhythm guitar. In 1966, they replaced Fore with drummer Stan Moore, and became The Zakary Thaks – the name being a mutated version of one seen in a magazine. Harrison and Fore went on to play with the Liberty Bell and Bubble Puppy respectively.

Influenced by blues guitarists as well as British and American groups of the period, the band soon gained local popularity. Their first record, for the local J-Beck label, combined an original composition, "Bad Girl", with a Kinks song, "I Need You". Released in mid-1966, it became a regional hit and was picked up nationally by Mercury Records. Its success won the band a spot supporting their heroes The Yardbirds.

A second single, "Face To Face", was less successful, but the band continued to tour, supporting acts including Jefferson Airplane and the 13th Floor Elevators. Later singles showed the band taking a more pop-focused approach. By 1968, Gerniottis had left the band for a while to join another group, the Liberty Bell, but returned later. However, the band did not repeat its early success, splitting up in the early 1970s.

In 1979, "Bad Girl" was included on the Volume 2 of the Pebbles anthology of mid-1960s garage bands, and has maintained its renown among collectors of the genre. The song was also included on disc four of the 1998 four-disc Nuggets: Original Artyfacts from the First Psychedelic Era, 1965–1968 box set. Compilations of the band's singles were issued in 1995 (on Collectables) and in May 2001. In 2015, a compilation called It's the End: The Definitive Collection was released and contained all of the group's master recordings from all six singles for the first time.

Drummer Stan Moore died in 2000. In 2004 and 2005, remaining members of the band reformed to perform at festivals. Bassist Rex Gregory died on January 18, 2008. Lead guitarist John Lopez died on February 23, 2022.

== Singles discography ==
Title	Year	Label	Catalog number	Notes
"Bad Girl" b/w "I Need You"	July 1966	J-Beck	J-1006	Later released on Mercury 72633
"Face to Face" b/w "Weekday Blues"	February 1967	J-Beck	J-1009	
"Please" b/w "Won't Come Back"	June 1967	J-Beck	J-1101	
"Mirror Of Yesterday" b/w "Can You Hear Daddy's Footsteps"	November 1967	J-Beck	J-1103	
"My Door" b/w "Green Crystal Ties"	1968	Thak	1001	
"Everybody Wants To Be Somebody" b/w "Outprint"	1969	Cee-Bee	1005	
