= The Morning Dew =

American garage rock band (1966–1971)

- The Morning Dew, (1968).

Background information
- Origin: Topeka, Kansas, United States
- Genres: Garage rock, psychedelic rock
- Years active: 1966–1971
- Labels: Roulette, Fairyland
- Past members: Mal Robinson; Don Sligar; Don Shuford; Don Anderson; Ferdy Baumgart; David Howell; Blair Honeyman; Bill Stahlin

The Morning Dew was an American garage rock band formed in Topeka, Kansas, and active between 1966 and 1971. In the group's existence, they became a popular attraction, spearheading the growth of psychedelic music in the region. They produced one now sought after studio album that exemplifies their experimental transition into psychedelic rock.

== History ==
In 1963, lead guitarist Mal Robinson and drummer Don Sligar formed The Impacts, a band composed of fellow Holiday Junior High School students that performed Top 40 songs. The band went through several incarnations, and name changes before emerging as a three-piece folk rock group, known as The Toads, that included Robinson, Don Sligar, and Don Shuford on bass guitar. No recordings of these early groups exist, however, it established them as a popular regional act, and in June 1966, with the addition of rhythm guitarist, Don Anderson, the band became The Morning Dew, which was a reference to the Bonnie Dobson song of the same name. As the band members graduated from high school, they all attended Washburn University and based themselves in the area.

The group began rehearsing and performing extensively to hone their playing form abilities for potential recordings. In August 1966, the band travelled to Lawrence to record four demo tapes, two of which were cover versions and the other two were original compositions. The two covers, "I'm Not Your Steppin' Stone" and "The Sportin' Life", became favorites in The Morning Dew's live act. Their two self-penned songs, "Winter Dreams" and "Touch of Magic", were both written by Robinson, and represented a transitional period for the band as they delved into complex musical structures. Subsequently, the demos completed were not released in the group's active duration, but they succeeded in attracting promoters and agents to record a single.

In late 1966, the band was signed by Fairyland Records to produce their debut single. By April 1967, the group entered Fairyland Studios to record the single, the first to be distributed by the label. Even with his inability to read music, Robinson, again, composed the two songs for the band. It required ten hours and ten takes each for the two songs, "No More" and "Look at Me Now", to be prepared at the expense of $200. In total, 2000 copies were issued for distribution, and the single managed to peak at number nine on the Topeka regional chart, KEWI. As a result of the record's success, The Morning Dew extended their touring throughout the Midwest. As psychedelic music became popularized, the band, then considered a typical rock outfit, completely morphed into a harder-edged psychedelic rock act, which was reflected in their elaborate light shows and stage performances. On July 14, 1967, The Morning Dew became the featured house band for a month at a nightclub near the Bagnell DamLake of the. Ozarks, Missouri. To correlate with the venture and future touring, KEWI radio maintained daily interviews with the group.

The band's excelling popularity necessitated another single, accordingly they registered further recording in Fairyland Studios in late 1967. Resulting, was the single "Be A Friend" b/w "Go Away", which included involvement with the regional groups, Plato and the Philosophers and Goldilocks and the Three Bears. Musicically, it displayed their versatility, as the compositions explored psychedelic influences, and it retained the band's folk rock roots. Their fan base was afflicted by the band's lack of focus on a specific genre, still the single charted in the top 30 in Topeka. Although the release was not near the success of their debut, the band's popularity did not show signs of declining. Throughout 1967 and 1968 the group performed with prominent acts like Strawberry Alarm Clock, The Drifters, Gary Puckett and The Turtles.

In 1968, The Morning Dew were sporadically involved in recording sessions that spanned from July into August. Ten songs were recorded, nine of which were originals by Robinson. The demos garnered interest from Roulette Records in 1969, making the band the earliest rock group from Kansas committed to a major label. Robinson later said the process of searching for a label was difficult, mainly due to their geographical location not being regarded as an epicenter of the psychedelic rock scene. The current songs were examples of the group's advancement into psychedelic music, along with unreleased material showing that the band was venturing outside the genre. Before the Roulette sessions, Blair Honeyman replaced Don Shuford on Bass guitar, due to the military draft in 1969. Finally, in 1970 The Morning Dew's debut album, At Last, was released and was poorly marketed, but has since become a collector's item. It saw the band replicating their live act by utilizing fuzz-tone guitars and other abnormal sound effects.

Still under contractual agreements, the band expected to produce another album. The band recorded demos with an altered lineup that swapped Anderson for Dave Howell on guitar and keyboards and added Ferdy Baumgart on a Hammond B3 and guitar. Baumgart was highly influential on the band's arrangements, which embraced a direction toward progressive rock. However, for financial and legal reasons, Roulette Records did not commit The Morning Dew to a recording schedule, so the practice tapes went unreleased. The final personnel change for the band, was Bill Stahlin, replacing Blair Honeyman on Bass guitar. Discouraged by the improbability of their second album being released, the band decided to disband in May 1971.

In 1995, Collectables Records released Second Album, which featured the material intended for the botched album when the group was active. In 2010, a compilation album titled No More 1966-1969 was distributed, and contained all of the group's recordings before their first album. Also in 2010, the Morning Dew was inducted into the Kansas Music Hall of Fame, where they had a reunion performance during the induction ceremony at Liberty Hall in Lawrence, Kansas.
