= The Mad Hatters (Annapolis band) =

American garage rock band

- Origin: Annapolis, Maryland, United States
- Genres: Garage rock; folk rock
- Years active: 1964-1967
- Labels: Ascot, Fontana
- Past members: Dave Vittek; Tom Curley; Alan Fowler; Richard Kumer; Bobby Howard

The Mad Hatters were an American garage rock band from Annapolis, Maryland who were active in the 1960s and had a following in the Washington DC and Baltimore area. They enjoyed brief local and regional success with their first single, "I Need Love," released in 1965, later recorded by the Time Stoppers. Though they failed to reach a wider audience, in the intervening years since their breakup they have become known amongst garage rock collectors and enthusiasts. Their 1966 song "I'll Come Running" has also become a song highly regarded amongst enthusiasts.

The band formed in Annapolis, Maryland in 1964. Their original lineup consisted of Dave Vittek on lead vocals, Tom Curley on lead guitar and harmonica, Alan Fowler on bass, and Richard Kumer on drums. They had been playing in local clubs for almost a year when they were discovered by Barry Seidel, who became their manager and brought them in to be the first act signed by his production company Traydel Productions. Seidel and his business partner Tony Traynor took the band to the recording studio to cut their first single "I Need Love" b/w a rock version of "Blowin' in the Wind." "I Need Love" was later recorded by the Time Stoppers. Seidel and Traynor licensed the Mad Hatters' single to Ascot Records, a division of United Artists Records, who released it in the fall of 1965. "I Need Love" became a local hit in the Baltimore, Washington D.C. area and elsewhere, but it failed to break nationally. The Mad Hatters had recorded and a second single for Ascot, featuring two songs written by Tom Curley "This Is How It's Gonna Be" b/w "Go Find a Love," but the label canceled the release after pressing promotional copies. The Mad Hatters signed with Fontana Records, who released their third single "I'll Come Running" b/w "Hello Girl" in late 1966. The record failed to catch on commercially. The band recorded a pair of pair of folk rock songs under the name the Loved ones, but they were never released. In early 1967, lead vocalist Dave Vittek left the group. For a while the Mad Hatters continued with Bobby Howard on lead vocals, but band had lost momentum and by the end of the year they broke up for. Drummer Richard Kumer went on to play in another Washington, DC area band, the Fallen Angels. Songs such as "I Need Love" and "I'll Come Running" have become popular with garage rock collectors over the years, and the Mad Hatters' work has since been reissued on several compilation albums, such as Sundazed Records' Garage Beat '66 Volume 7: That's How It Will Be!, and their collected works are included on The Mad Hatters/Meet the Fallen Angels: Washington DC 1965-66 CD released in 2012 on Cicadelic Records.

== Membership ==
- Dave Vittek (lead vocals)
- Tom Curley (lead guitar and harmonica)
- Alan Fowler (bass)
- Richard Kumer (drums)
- Bobby Howard (lead vocals)

== Discography ==
- "I Need Love" b/w "Blowin' in the Wind" (Ascot 2197, October 1965)
- "This Is How It's Gonna Be" b/w "Go Find a Love" (Ascot, rec. 1965, unissued)
- "I'll Come Running" b/w "Hello Girl"(Fontana 1582, 1966)
