= The Human Expression =

American garage/psychedelic rock band

Background information
- Origin: Los Angeles, California, United States
- Genres: Garage rock; psychedelic rock
- Years active: 1966–1967
- Labels: Accent
- Past members: Jim Quarles; Jim Foster; Tom Hamilton; Armand Poulin; Martin Eshleman

The Human Expression was an American garage and psychedelic rock band from Los Angeles that released three well-regarded singles, and made additional demo recordings between 1966 and 1967.

== History ==
The band formed in 1966, with the members coming from Westminster, California, and Tustin, California (both in Orange County). Jim Quarles came up with the name "because it had a mystical and otherworldly ring", and the father of one of the band members (Jim Foster) served as their manager. The two then began writing songs for the new band: "I didn't know what I was doing at the time. I just wrote the songs with Jim Foster. I didn't have any prior experience." The band would start performing in local venues and school dances to create a more cohesive unit.

After rehearsing for six months, they went to a recording studio and cut the demo recordings for their first single, eventually securing a recording contract with Los Angeles-based Accent Records. While the "A" side of the demo single was selected, the "B" side was replaced with a song that is probably their best known recording, "Love at Psychedelic Velocity."

Two more original compositions made up the second single; the demos and the released recordings of each side have survived. Both singles were mixed by Wally Heider, famed for his work with the Grateful Dead.

Perhaps due to the slow sales of the band's own songs, their manager brought demos of two songs by then-unknown songwriter Mars Bonfire to the band to consider for their third single. They selected "Sweet Child of Nothingness" as the "A" side of their third single, to be backed with another original composition as the "B" side. The other song was "Born to Be Wild," which did not impress Jim Quarles; in 1968, this would become a smash hit by Steppenwolf. The band, at this point, also began playing across the Sunset Strip but were limited in venues due to still being minors.

Before the band's third single was released, lead guitarist Martin Eshleman injured his hand. The band was practicing, and were taking a break when Tom Hamilton accidentally slammed a door on Eshleman's hand, lodging it in glass. Eshleman had severed tendons and an artery, and was forced to leave the band. Although a new guitarist was brought in, Quarles left almost immediately: "This move kind of destroyed the chemistry of the band. I felt it was time to move on".

== Musical highlights ==
"Love at Psychedelic Velocity" is featured on the last of the 10 LPs issued by BFD Records in the Pebbles series as well as on Vol. 7 of the Garage Beat '66 CD series, put out by Sundazed Music. It has an unusual structure in that, in two places, the pace of the song slows down dramatically – sounding like the Vogues, according to the liner notes for Pebbles, Volume 10 – and then speeds to a breakneck pace immediately afterward. Despite the song's name, "Love at Psychedelic Velocity" is more in the style of a garage rock song than a psychedelic rock song.

This being the 1960s, the original B-side of their first single, "Readin' Your Will", may have been dropped due to its being a cautionary tale about a friend who is indulging too much in illicit sex and drugs. Had it remained the single's flip side, this song would have been released in the same year as "Kicks" by Paul Revere and the Raiders, which has a similar theme.

Their second single is an ethereal psychedelic rock number called "Optical Sound", where the singer is collecting his thoughts after a drug experience. The title may refer to the synesthesia that is sometimes experienced by people on an LSD trip. This may be their best recording, and it is included on twice as many compilation albums as "Love at Psychedelic Velocity."

As a later reviewer noted: "In a different reality, they might've been a more mature and serious competitor to the Seeds, perhaps even succeeding at doing what the Doors did, only without the literary pretensions or personal excesses."

== Post break-up ==
Following the break-up of The Human Expression, Quarles cut several demo recordings in the studio, though they were not released until collected on a 1994 retrospective album (see below). He has worked for many years as a studio engineer in the music industry. The music of The Human Expression has been compiled by Collectables Records/Cicadelic Records on a retrospective album called Love at Psychedelic Velocity that was released in 1994. Meantime, Martin Eshelman and Armand Poulin were in the process of establishing another band called "Rap", with guitarist Tony Foley and bass player Able Rodrigez. Though they worked out some pretty good songs together, the band disbanded for unknown reasons.

A compilation album, The Human Expression & Other Psychedelic Groups, was released by the same label in 2000 and featured three of their songs (and virtually the same cover), plus additional recordings by several other bands. Though listed as a track unique to this CD, "Your Mind Works in Reverse" is the same song and recording as "Room of Shadows" which appears on some other Human Expression compilations. Whether this song is actually by the band or by Jim Quarles individually is unclear, although the unreleased songs on Love at Psychedelic Velocity are credited only to Quarles.

There are also many sites where songs by The Human Expression are available as downloads.

Finally, the original 45s also surface occasionally and are in great demand. In 2003, an original pressing of the "Optical Sound" single sold on eBay for $2,300.

== Discography ==
=== Retrospective album ===
- Love at Psychedelic Velocity; Collectables Records (#COL-0588); 1994 release on CD

=== Singles ===
- "Every Night" b/w "Love at Psychedelic Velocity"; Accent Records (#AC 1214); rel. summer 1966?
- "Optical Sound" b/w "Calm Me Down"; Accent Records (#AC 1226); rel. winter 1966?
- "Sweet Child of Nothingness" b/w "I Don't Need Nobody"; Accent Records (#AC 1252); rel. summer 1967?

=== Compilations ===
"Love at Psychedelic Velocity":

- Pebbles, Volume 10 (LP).
- Best of Pebbles, Volume 3 (LP and CD)
- Songs We Taught the Fuzztones (LP and CD)

"Optical Sound":

- Nuggets#1: Original Artyfacts From The First Psychedelic Era 1965-1968 (box set)
- Echoes in Time, Volume 1 (LP)
- Echoes in Time, Volumes 1 and 2 (CD)
- Psychedelic Disaster Whirl (LP)
- The Human Expression & Other Psychedelic Groups (CD)
- Green Crystal Ties, Volume 6 (CD)
- Garage Beat '66, Volume 5 (CD)

"Every Night":

- Highs in the Mid-Sixties, Volume 3 (LP)
- Green Crystal Ties, Volume 9 (CD)

"Calm Me Down":

- Highs in the Mid-Sixties, Volume 20 (LP)
- The Human Expression & Other Psychedelic Groups (CD)
- Green Crystal Ties, Volume 6 (CD)

"Readin' Your Will":

- Green Crystal Ties, Volume 9 (CD)
- Garage Beat '66, Volume 5 (CD)

"Who Is Burning?":

- Psychedelic Crown Jewels, Volume 1 (LP and CD)

"Your Mind Works in Reverse" (a.k.a. "Room of Shadows"):

- The Human Expression & Other Psychedelic Groups (CD)
