= List of garage rock bands =

The following is a list of notable garage rock bands. It is not exclusive to collective bands, but also includes solo acts who have created music in this style (usually backed by accompanying musicians). The list features artists from the US and Canada, but also includes similar acts from other countries.

== 1960s garage bands ==
- The 13th Floor Elevators (Austin, Texas)

=== A ===
- The Aardvarks (Muskegon, Michigan)
- The Ace of Cups (San Francisco, California; all-female group)
- The Allman Joys (Daytona, Florida)
- The Atlantics (Sydney, Australia)

=== B ===
- Baby Huey & the Babysitters (Gary, Indiana)
- Black (Hackensack, New Jersey)
- The Bad Roads (Lake Charles, Louisiana)
- The Bad Seeds (Corpus Christi, Texas)
- The Baskerville Hounds (Cleveland, Ohio)
- The Balloon Farm (New Jersey, United States)
- The Banshees (Chicago, Illinois)
- The Barbarians (Cape Cod, Massachusetts)
- The Bare Facts (Portsmouth, Ohio)
- The Baroques (Milwaukee, Wisconsin)
- The Basement Wall (Baton Rouge, Louisiana)
- The Beach Nuts (Point Pleasant Beach, New Jersey)
- The Beau Brummels (San Francisco, California)
- The Beefeaters (Copenhagen, Denmark)
- The Bees (Covina, California)
- The Better Half-Dozen (New Orleans, Louisiana)
- The Birdwatchers (Tampa, Florida)
- The Black Diamonds (Lithgow, New South Wales, Australia)
- Blacklisters (Leeds, West Yorkshire, England)
- The Bluestars (Auckland, New Zealand)
- Blues Magoos (The Bronx, New York, New York)
- The Blue Things (Hays, Kansas)
- The Bobby Fuller Four (El Paso, Texas)
- Bohemian Vendetta (Long Island, New York)
- The Bojax (Greenville, South Carolina)
- The Breakers (Memphis, Tennessee)
- The Brigands (Forest Hills, Long Island, New York)
- The Brogues (Merced, California)
- The Bruthers (Pearl River, New York)
- The Brymers (San Joaquin Valley, California)
- The Bumpers (Rome, Italy)

=== C ===
- Dean Carter (Danville, Illinois)
- The Caretakers of Deception (Los Angeles, California)
- The Castaways (Minneapolis/St. Paul, Minnesota)
- The Chargers (Wenatchee, Washington)
- The Charlatans (San Francisco, California)
- The Cherry Slush (Saginaw, Michigan)
- The Chessmen (Denton, Texas)
- The Chocolate Watchband (San Jose, California)
- The Choir (Cleveland, Ohio)
- Christopher and the Souls (McAllen, Texas)
- Clear Light (Los Angeles, California)
- Ray Columbus & the Invaders (Christchurch, New Zealand)
- The Continental Co-ets (Fulda, Minnesota; all-female group)
- Count Five (San Jose, California)
- The Creatures (Australia)
- The Crusaders (Los Angeles, California)
- The Cryan' Shames (Chicago, Illinois)

=== D ===
- The D-Men (Stamford, Connecticut)
- The Dagenites (Oxon Hill, Maryland)
- The Daisy Chain (Fullerton, California; all-female group)
- Danny and the Counts (El Paso, Texas)
- Danny's Reasons (Minneapolis, Minnesota)
- The Dantes (Worthington, Ohio)
- The Daughters of Eve (Chicago, Illinois; all-female group)
- The David (Bakersfield, California)
- The Daybreakers (Muscatine, Iowa)
- The Deakins (Melbourne, Australia)
- The Dearly Beloved (Tucson, Arizona)
- The Detroit Wheels (Detroit, Michigan)
- Dr. Spec's Optical Illusion (New Orleans, Louisiana)
- Don and the Goodtimes (Portland, Oregon)
- The Doughboys (South Plainfield, New Jersey)
- The Dovers (Santa Barbara, California)
- Downliners Sect (Twickenham, London, England)
- The Driving Stupid (New Jersey)
- The Druids of Stonehenge (New York, New York)

=== E ===
- The E-Types (Salinas, California)
- The Easybeats (Sydney, Australia)
- The Echoes of Carnaby Street (Miami, Florida)
- The Electras (Ely, Minnesota)
- The Electric Elves (Cortland, New York)
- The Electric Prunes (San Fernando Valley)
- The Enfields (Wilmington, Delaware)
- Ernie and the Emperors (Santa Barbara, California)
- The Escapades (Memphis, Tennessee)
- Euphoria's Id (Saco, Maine)
- Evil (Miami, Florida)
- The Eyes (United Kingdom)

=== F ===
- The Fe-Fi-Four Plus 2 (Albuquerque, New Mexico)
- The Feminine Complex (Nashville, Tennessee; all-female group)
- The Fifth Estate (Stamford, Connecticut)
- The Final Solution (San Francisco, California)
- Five Americans (Durant, Oklahoma)
- Joe Frank and the Knights (Leland, Mississippi)

=== G ===
- The Gants (Greenwood, Mississippi)
- Los Gatos Salvajes (Buenos Aires, Argentina)
- The Gaunga Dyns (New Orleans, Louisiana)
- The Gentlemen (Dallas, Texas)
- The Gestures (Mankato, Minnesota)
- The Golden Cups (Yokohama, Japan)
- Goldie and the Gingerbreads (New York, New York; all-female group)
- The Golliwogs (El Cerrito, California; later Creedence Clearwater Revival)
- The Grains of Sand (Los Angeles, California)
- The Great Society (San Francisco, California)
- Green Fuz (Bridgeport, Texas)
- The Grifs (Charlotte, North Carolina)
- The Grodes/The Tongues of Truth (Tucson, Arizona)
- The Groupies (New York, New York)
- The Guess Who (Winnipeg, Manitoba, garage rock band in mid-60s)
- The Guilloteens (Memphis, Tennessee)

=== H ===
- The Hangmen (Rockville, Maryland)
- Harbinger Complex (Fremont, California)
- The Haunted (Montreal, Quebec)
- The Heard (Longview, Texas)
- Henry Flynt & The Insurrections (New York, New York)
- The Hombres (Memphis, Tennessee)
- The Human Beinz (Youngstown, Ohio)
- The Human Expression (Los Angeles, California)
- The Humane Society (Simi Valley, California)
- The Humans (Albion, New York)
- Hunger (Portland, Oregon)

=== I ===
- The Ides of March (Berwyn, Illinois)
- The Iguanas (Ann Arbor, Michigan)
- The Index (Grosse Point, Michigan)
- The Invictas (Rochester, New York)
- Island of Love (London, England)

=== J ===
- The Jades (Sparta, Michigan)
- The Jesters (Memphis, Tennessee)
- The JuJus (Grand Rapids, Michigan)

=== K ===
- Kazna Za Uši (Belgrade, Serbia )
- Kenny and the Kasuals (Dallas, Texas, United States )
- The Kingsmen (Portland, Oregon)
- The Kings Ransom (Allentown, Pennsylvania)
- The Kinks (London, England)
- The Kitchen Cinq (Amarillo, Texas)
- The Knack (British band) (Ilford, United Kingdom)
- The Knack (Los Angeles, California – 1960s )
- The Knaves (Chicago, Illinois)
- The Knickerbockers (Bergenfield, New Jersey)
- The Kreeg (Albuquerque, New Mexico)

=== L ===
- The La De Da's (Huapai, New Zealand)
- Larry and the Blue Notes (Fort Worth, Texas)
- Larry's Rebels (Ponsonby, New Zealand)
- Lawson and Four More (Memphis, Tennessee)
- The Leaves (San Fernando Valley)
- The Lemon Drops (McHenry, Illinois)
- The Lemon Fog (Houston, Texas)
- Leo and the Prophets (Austin, Texas)
- The Lewallen Brothers (Tucson, Arizona)
- The Liberty Bell (Corpus Christi, Texas)
- The Litter (Minneapolis, Minnesota)
- The Little Boy Blues (Chicago, Illinois)
- Liverpool Five (London, England)
- The Lost (New England band) (Plainfild, Vermont)
- Love (Los Angeles, California)
- The Loved Ones (Melbourne, Victoria, Australia)
- The Luv'd Ones (Niles, Michigan; all-female group)

=== M ===
- The Mad Hatters (Annapolis, Maryland)
- The Magic Mushrooms (Philadelphia, Pennsylvania)
- The Masters Apprentices (Adelaide, South Australia, Australia)
- The McCoys (Union City, Indiana)
- Michael and the Messengers (Winona, Minnesota)
- Mike Krol (Los Angeles, California)
- Milan the Leather Boy (Florida)
- The Missing Links (Sydney, New South Wales, Australia)
- Mr. Lucky and the Gamblers (Newport, Oregon)
- Los Mockers (Montevideo, Uruguay)
- The Modds (Miami, Florida)
- The Mojo Men (San Francisco, California)
- The Monks (Germany)
- The Montells (Miami, Florida)
- The Moods (Melbourne, Victoria, Australia)
- The Morning Dew (Topeka, Kansas)
- Mouse and the Traps (Tyler, Texas)
- The Movin' Morfomen (Espanola, New Mexico)
- Moving Sidewalks (Houston, Texas)
- The Music Explosion (Mansfield, Ohio)
- The Music Machine (Los Angeles, California)
- The Myddle Class (Berkeley Heights, New Jersey)
- The Mystery Trend (San Francisco, California)
- The Mystic Tide (Long Island, New York)

=== N ===
- The Nightcaps (Dallas, Texas)
- The Night Walkers (San Juan, Puerto Rico)
- The Nightcrawlers (Daytona Beach, Florida)
- The Nomads (Texas City, Texas)
- The North Atlantic Invasion Force (New Haven, Connecticut )
- The Northwest Company (Haney, British Columbia, Canada)
- The Novas (Dallas/Fort Worth, Texas)

=== O ===
- The Opposite Six (Sacramento, California)
- Oscar and the Majestics (Gary, Indiana)
- The Other Half (Los Angeles, California)
- The Others (South Kingstown, Rhode Island)
- The Outcasts (San Antonio, Texas)
- The Outsiders (Cleveland, Ohio)
- The Outsiders (Amsterdam, Netherlands)
- The Outsiders (Tampa, Florida)
- The Oxford Circle (Davis, California)

=== P ===
- The Painted Faces (Fort Myers, Florida))
- The Palace Guard (Los Angeles, California)
- The Palace Guards (Metairie, Louisiana)
- The Paragons (Charlotte, North Carolina)
- Paul Revere & the Raiders (Boise, Idaho)
- The Paupers (Toronto, Ontario)
- The Penthouse 5 (Oak Cliff, Texas)
- The Pink Finks (Melbourne, Australia)
- Pitche Blende (Saginaw, Michigan)
- The Plagues (Lansing, Michigan)
- The Pleasure Seekers (Detroit, Michigan; all-female group)
- The Pleazers (Brisbane, Australia)
- The Poor (Los Angeles, California)
- The Preachers (Los Angeles, California)
- The Premiers (San Gabriel, California)
- The Pretty Things (London, England)
- Public Nuisance (Sacramento, California)
- The Purple Gang (Los Angeles, California)
- The Purple Hearts (Brisbane, Australia)

=== Q ===
- Q65 (The Hague, Netherlands)
- Question Mark & the Mysterians (Bay City and Saginaw, Michigan)
- The Quests (Grand Rapids, Michigan)
- The Quiet Jungle (Toronto, Canada)

=== R ===
- Randy and the Radiants (Memphis, Tennessee)
- The Rationals (Ann Arbor, Michigan)
- The Ravens (Roosevelt, New York)
- The Remains (Boston, Massachusetts)
- The Redcoats (Wildwood, New Jersey)
- Richard and the Young Lions (Newark, New Jersey)
- The Rising Storm (Andover, Massachusetts)
- The Rising Tydes (Philadelphia, Pennsylvania)
- The Rivieras (South Bend, Indiana)
- The Rockin' Ramrods (Boston, Massachusetts)
- The Rokes (Italy)
- The Romancers (Los Angeles, California)
- The Rovin' Flames (Tampa, Florida)

=== S ===
- Los Saicos (Lima, Peru)
- Sam the Sham & The Pharaohs (Dallas, Texas)
- The Savages (Bermuda)
- The Seeds (Los Angeles, California)
- The Shadows of Knight (Chicago, Illinois)
- The Shag (Milwaukee, Wisconsin)
- The Shaggs (Fremont, New Hampshire; all-female group)
- The Shags (New Haven, Connecticut)
- Los Shakers (Montevideo, Uruguay)
- The Shames (Ipswich, Massachusetts)
- The Shanes (Tuollavaara, Sweden)
- The Shy Guys (Oak Park, Illinois)
- Sir Douglas Quintet (San Antonio, Texas)
- Sir Winston and the Commons (Indianapolis, Indiana)
- The Sloths (Los Angeles, California)
- The Smoke (York, England)
- The Sonics (Tacoma, Washington)
- The Sons of Adam (Baltimore, Maryland)
- The Soul Survivors (Denver, Colorado)
- The Sparkles (Levelland, Texas)
- The Spiders (band later known as Alice Cooper) (Phoenix, Arizona)
- The Spiders (Japan)
- The Squires (Bristol, Connecticut)
- The Standells (Los Angeles, California)
- The Starfires (Los Angeles, California)
- The Stillroven (Robbinsdale, Minnesota)
- The Strangeloves (New York, New York)
- Strawberry Alarm Clock (Los Angeles, California)
- The Stumblin' Blox (Abilene, Texas)
- The Swamp Rats (Pittsburgh, Pennsylvania)
- Syndicate of Sound (San Jose, California)
- The Syndicats (England)

=== T ===
- The Tamrons (Concord, North Carolina)
- T.C. Atlantic (Minneapolis, Minnesota)
- Teddy and His Patches (San Jose, California)
- The Tempests (Tampa Bay, Florida)
- Thee Midniters (East Los Angeles, California)
- Them (Belfast, Northern Ireland)
- Things To Come (Long Beach, California)
- Terry Knight and the Pack (Flint, Michigan; later Grand Funk Railroad)
- The Third Bardo (New York City, New York)
- The Throb (Sydney, New South Wales, Australia)
- The Tidal Waves (Roseville, Michigan)
- Tommy James and the Shondells (Niles, Michigan)
- Tonto and the Renegades (Grand Ledge, Michigan)
- The Traits (New Rochelle, New York)
- The Trashmen (Minneapolis, Minnesota)
- The Troggs (Andover, Hampshire, England)
- The Tropics (Tampa, Florida )
- The Troyes (Battle Creek, Michigan)
- Twentieth Century Zoo (Phoenix, Arizona)

=== U ===
- The Ugly Ducklings (Toronto, Ontario)
- The Underdogs (Grosse Pointe, Michigan)
- The Uniques (Shreveport, Louisiana)
- The United Travel Service (Portland, Oregon)
- The Unrelated Segments (Taylor, Michigan)

=== V ===
- The Vagrants (Long Island, New York)
- The Vejtables (Millbrae, California)
- Velvet Crest (Mineral City, Ohio)
- The Velvet Illusions (Yakima, Washington)
- The Velvet Underground (New York, New York)

=== W ===
- The Wailers (Tacoma, Washington)
- We the People (Orlando/Winter Park, Florida)
- The Wheels (Belfast, Northern Ireland)
- Wild Cherries (Melbourne, Victoria, Australia)
- The Wilde Knights (Longview, Washington)
- Wimple Winch (Liverpool, England)
- Ed Wool and the Nomads/Wool (Watertown, New York)
- The Woolies (Lansing, Michigan)

=== X ===
- Xysma (New York, New York)

=== Y ===
- The Yellow Payges (Los Angeles, California)
- Yesterday's Children (Cheshire-Prospect, Connecticut)
- The Yardbirds (London, England)

=== Z ===
- Zakary Thaks (Corpus Christi, Texas)

== See also ==
- American rock
- Beat music
- Freakbeat
- Garage punk (fusion genre)
- Group Sounds (Japan)
- List of garage rock compilation albums
- Nederbeat
- Protopunk
- Punk rock
- Pub rock (United Kingdom)
- Rock and roll
- Surf rock
- Uruguayan Invasion
