= Fortune & Maltese & the Phabulous Pallbearers =

American garage rock band

Fortune and Maltese
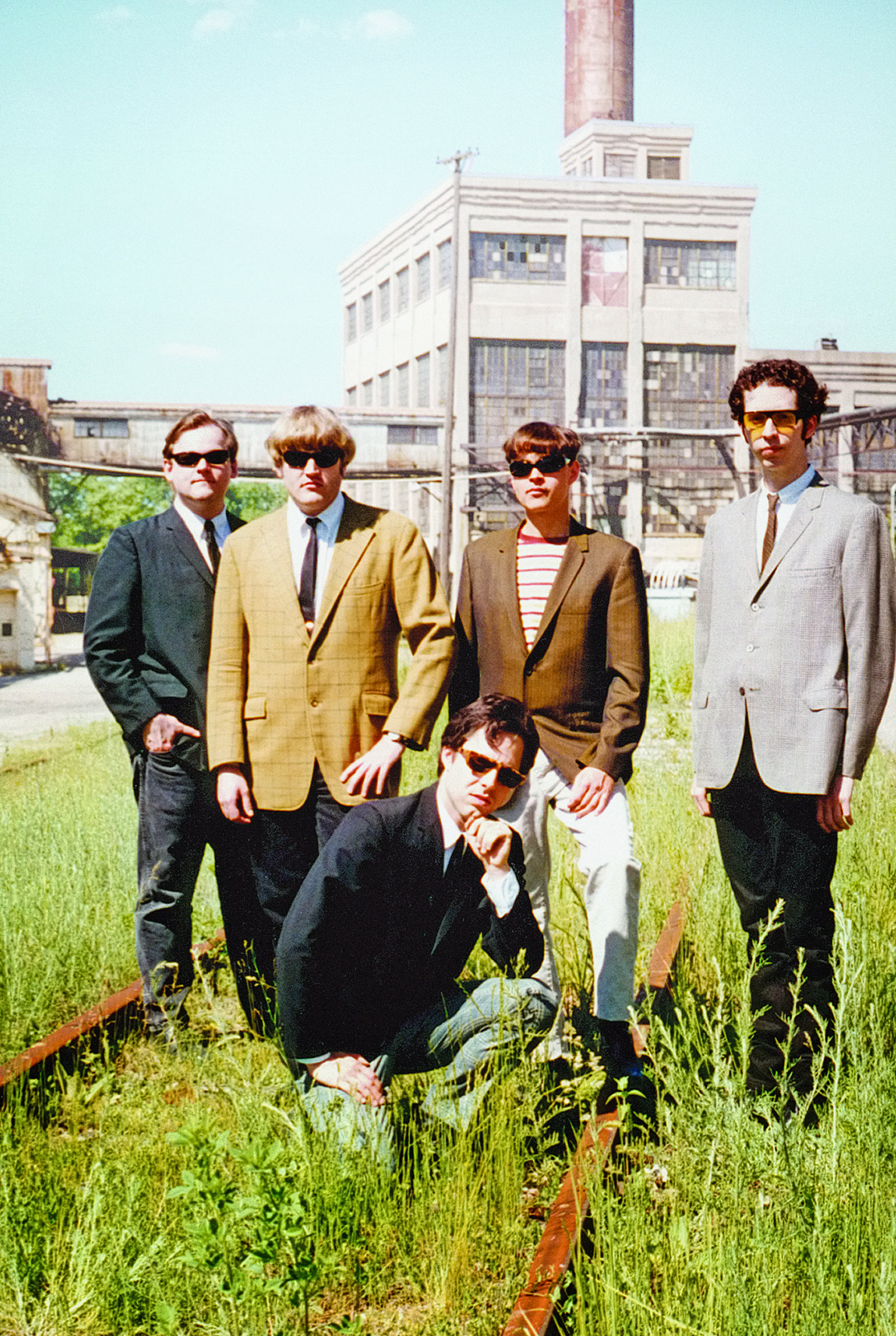
- Fortune and Maltese & The Phabulous Pallbearers

Background information
- Also known as: Fortune & Maltese
- Origin: Detroit, Michigan
- Genres: Garage rock
- Years active: 1993 – present
- Labels: Leppotone, Happy Hour, Hillsdale Records, Larsen, Get Hip, Keystone Record Co., 360 Twist! Records, CAD Records, Dionysus Records, Screaming Apple Records, Misty Lane, Splitsville Records, MuSick Recordings; original songs registered with Lake Of Hits Music, BMI
- Members: Freddy Fortune: vocals Michael Maltese: bass, organ, vocals Nat Cromlech: guitar, vocals Dusty Sexton: drums J.C. Graves: bass
- Past members: Karl Cromlech
- Website: Official website

Fortune And Maltese are an American garage rock band from Detroit, Michigan, formed in 1993 in Kalamazoo, Michigan.

== History ==
One of the early groups to define the Garage Rock revival in Detroit and the United States, Fortune & Maltese (a/k/a Fortune and Maltese and The Phabulous Pallbearers) are a five-piece Detroit-based garage band. Formed in 1993 in Kalamazoo & Ann Arbor, MI by Michael Maltese, Freddy Fortune, Nat Cromlech, Dusty Sexton and J.C. Graves, they have toured The United States, Europe and Canada with their particular brand of 1960s-influenced music and have been featured in the films "It Came From Detroit" and on the soundtrack to the Russ Meyer-homage "Pervert ".

In November 2010 Fortune and Maltese were named "No. 35" in their "Detroit's Greatest Hits That Should Have Been" list with their single "Leave No Stone Unturned" / "Time Has Gone" (Get Hip) 1997.

In 2013 Freddy Fortune and Michael Maltese appeared with other Detroit musicians as Benedict Arnold & The Traitors to play in San Diego with Paul Revere & the Raiders front man Mark Lindsay at the Ugly Things Magazines 30th Anniversary Celebration

== Partial discography ==
=== Singles and EPs (7") ===
1. No Dice 7" (Leppotone & Happy Hour Records, 1993, LT-003)

- 1. No Dice (Fortune, Maltese)
- 2. Fools' Gold (Fortune, Maltese)
- 3. Take My Word (B. Fuller/M. Stone)
- 4. Pepsi Commercial (Fortune, Maltese)
- 5. Wicked Weed (Fortune, Maltese)

2. Wig Wam 7" (Leppotone & Happy Hour Records, 1994, LT-005)

- 1. Wig Wam Promo/Wig Wam (Fortune, Maltese)
- 2. Gone, Gone, Gone (D. Everly/P. Everly)
- 3. Kent Berglund Action Man (Fortune/Maltese)
- 4. Don't Mind If I Do (Fortune/Maltese)

3. Genie In The Lamp 7" (360 Twist! Records, 1997, 36T-009)

- 1. Genie In The Lamp (Fortune, Maltese)
- 2. Vampira (Fortune/Maltese)

4. Leave No Stone Unturned 7" (Get Hip, 1997, GH-212)

- 1. Leave No Stone Unturned (Fortune/Maltese/Cromlech)
- 2. Time Has Gone (Fortune/Chan/Kaufman)

5. Bewitched 7" (Larsen Records, 1997, LZ 039)

- 1. Bewitched (Maltese/Hurtt)
- 2. Don't Wanna Cry (Andre Siebert)

6. Disk Jockey Promo Record 7" (Hillsdale Records, 1997, HR 018) Sent to disk jockeys only – 300 pressed

- 1. D.J. Interview w/Fortune & Maltese (Open-ended for Disk Jockey Participation)
- 2. She's A Blowout (Fortune/Maltese)
- 3. PSA – Stay In School (Fortune/Maltese)
- 4. Commercial – Coca-Cola

7. Knaughty Knight 7" (CAD Records, 1999, 45001)

- 1. Knaughty Knight (Fortune/Maltese)
- 2. Good-N-Plenty (Fortune/Maltese)

8. Fiddled While Rome Burned 7" (Keystone Record Co., 2000, KEY-2EP)

- 1. Fiddled While Rome Burned (Fortune/Maltese/Cromlech/Sexton/Graves)
- 2. Wrong From The Start
- 3. Mindreader
- 4. I'm Crying

9. Sonic Sounds From Seattle 7" (Dionysus Records, 2001, ID 0745102)

- 1. Girl Go Run Away
- 2. You Watch The Road (Fortune/Maltese)
- 3. Don't Question Me (Fortune/Maltese/Cromlech/Cromlech/Sexton/Graves)
- 4. Jump, Jive And Harmonize!

10. Girls Gotta Learn 7" (Get Hip, 2004, GH-231) with Jonny Chan, Amy Surdu, John Szymanski & Mike Latulippe

- 1. Girl's Gotta Learn (Maltese)
- 2. I Hate You Baby (Fortune/Schroeder)
- 3. Oh Yeah Alright (Maltese/Chan)
- 4. Do What I Want (Fortune/Chan)

=== LPs & CDs ===
1. Fortune & Maltese And The Phabulous Pallbearers LP 1996 (Screaming Apple Records, SCALP 110)

- 1. Wig Wam Promo/Wig Wam (Fortune/Maltese)
- 2. No Dice (Fortune/Maltese)
- 3. Fools' Gold (Fortune/Maltese)
- 4. Gone, Gone, Gone (D. Everly/P. Everly)
- 5. Wicked Weed (Fortune/Maltese)
- 6. Take My Word (B. Fuller/M. Stone)
- 7. Don't Mind If I Do (Fortune/Maltese)
- 8. Kent Berglund Action Man (Fortune/Maltese)
- 9. Let's Dance (J. Lee)
- 10. Bamboozled Again (Fortune/Maltese)
- 11. Low Man (On Her Totem Pole) (Fortune/Maltese)
- 12. Try A Little Harder (Fortune)
- 13. I Just Don't Care (Fortune/Maltese)
- 14. Chase You (P. Katrich/T. Conway)
- 15. I Found A New Love (Nehring/Marusak)
- 16. Golden Arm (Fortune/Maltese)
- 17. The Bummer (Martin/Ruiz)
- 18. Black Hood (Maltese/Cromlech/Sexton/Cornfinger)

2. Fortune & Maltese And The Phabulous Pallbearers CD (Get Hip, GH-1057)

- 1. Wig Wam Promo (Fortune/Maltese)
- 2. Wig Wam (Fortune/Maltese)
- 3. No Dice (Fortune/Maltese)
- 4. Fools' Gold (Fortune/Maltese)
- 5. Gone, Gone, Gone (D. Everly/P. Everly)
- 6. Wicked Weed (Fortune/Maltese)
- 7. Take My Word (B. Fuller/M. Stone)
- 8. Don't Mind If I Do (Fortune/Maltese)
- 9. Kent Berglund Action Man (Fortune/Maltese)
- 10. Let's Dance (J. Lee)
- 11. Bamboozled Again (Fortune/Maltese)
- 12. Low Man (On Her Totem Pole) (Fortune/Maltese)
- 13. Try A Little Harder (Fortune)
- 14. I Just Don't Care (Fortune/Maltese)
- 15. Chase You (P. Katrich/T. Conway)
- 16. I Found A New Love (Nehring/Marusak)
- 17. Golden Arm (Fortune/Maltese)
- 18. The Bummer (Martin/Ruiz)
- 19. Black Hood (Maltese/Cromlech/Sexton/Cornfinger)
- 20. Du Toc (Fortune/Maltese) CD BONUS CUT
- 21. Louise (J.L. Kincaid) CD BONUS CUT

3. Konquer Kampus LP/CD 1996 (Hillsdale Records, HLP-103)

- 1. If Push Comes To Shove (Fortune/Maltese)
- 2. My Baby's Hearse (Fortune/Maltese)
- 3. Cuttin' Class (Fortune/Maltese)
- 4. Ask The Swami (Fortune/Maltese)
- 5. She's A Blowout (Fortune/Maltese)
- 6. Let's All Go To The Science Fair (Fortune/Maltese)
- 7. Study Break (Fortune/Maltese)
- 8. Tappa Kegga USA (Fortune/Maltese)
- 9. Tally Ho (Fortune/Maltese)
- 10. Girls Ruin Everything (Maltese)
- 11. Truth Serum (Fortune/Maltese/Cromlech)
- 12. Pizza Party Twist (Fortune/Maltese)
- 13. Cuz I Want You Yeah I Need You (Fortune/Maltese)
- 14. High Horse (Fortune/Maltese/Cromlech)
- 15. Stay In School Promo (Fortune/Maltese)

4. LIVE AT HARVEY'S, 18 cuts (Dutch bootleg of live set w/prev. unreleased F&M bonus cuts...)

- 1. The Bummer
- 2. No Dice
- 3. Wig Wam
- 4. Fool's Gold
- 5. Kent Berglund Action Man
- 6. Don't Mind If I Do
- 7. Ballad Of A Useless Man
- 8. I Found A New Love
- 9. **Radio Amsterdam Interview**
- 10. Just Don't Care
- 11. Try It
- 12. Wicked Weed
- 13. Low Man On Her Totem Pole
- 14. Golden Arm
- 15. Bewitched
- 16. Action Woman
- 17. Dirty Old Man
- 18. Chevy Man (Studio Acetate)

=== Compilations ===
1. TransWorld Garage Scene Volume 2 LP (Misty Lane, 1996, MISTY 033)

- 1 I Just Don't Care (Fortune/Maltese)

2. Splitsville Confidential 7" (Splitsville Records, 1997, U-43423)

- 1 track: Louise (Paul Revere & The Raiders)

3. Our Favorite Texan: Bobby Fuller Four-Ever! CD (#9 Records JAPAN, 1999 & 2000, ZOE-001)

- 1 track: Pamela

4. Takin' Out the Trash: A Tribute to the Trashmen CD (Double Crown Records, 2000)

- 2 tracks: Sleeper and King Of The Surf

5. Swingin' Creepers, A Tribute To The Ventures CD (MuSick Recordings, 2000, MuSick 0010)

- 1 track: The Twomp

6. PERVERT! Original Motion Picture Soundtrack (Infinite Entertainment Records, 2005)

- 2 tracks: Oh Yeah Alright and No Dice

7. The Sweet Sounds of Detroit CD (Bellyache Records (BR-001) 2006)

- 1 track: Alice Long (Boyce/Hart)

8. Ghoul's Delight A Monster Party Record 2-CD Set (Bellyache Records (BR-001) 2006)

- 1 track: Vampira (Fortune/Maltese)

9. The Sweet Sounds of Detroit Volume 2 CD (Bellyache Records (BR-017) 2009)

- 1 track: Good N Plenty (Fortune/Maltese)

== See also ==
- Frat rock
- Garage punk
- Pub rock (United Kingdom)
- Pub rock (Australia)
- Group Sounds (Japan)
- List of garage rock bands
