= The Palace Guards (Louisiana band) =

American garage rock band

Background information
- Origin: Metairie, Louisiana, United States
- Genres: Garage rock; folk rock; psychedelic
- Years active: 1966–1970
- Labels: U-Doe, White Cliffs
- Past members: Les Gray; Glenn Acomb; Jeff Miller; Richie Faber; Frank Bua; Ray Morant; Doug Davis; Bobby Fonseca

The Palace Guards were an American garage rock band from Metairie, Louisiana, a suburb of New Orleans, who were active in the mid to late 1960s. Their approach was highly influenced by the British Invasion popularized by bands such as the Beatles and the Rolling Stones but was also informed by the folk rock and soul sounds coming out of America during the period. Drummer Frank Bua would later go on, years later, to play with the popular roots rock and funk group, the Radiators.

== History ==
The Palace Guards were formed in Metairie, Louisiana, a suburb of New Orleans, in 1966. Their original lineup consisted of Les Gray on vocals, Glenn Acomb and Jeff Miller on guitars, Richie Faber on bass, and Frank Bua on drums. They became one of the better-known of dozens of local garage bands along with the Gaunga Dyns, Dr. Spec's Optical Illusion, the Better Half-Dozen, the Glory Rhodes and others. They were regular fixtures at clubs such as the Beaconette, which would hold frequent battles of the bands. Guitarist Camile Baudoin played with the Souls of the Slain who were also regulars there, and he and drummer Frank Bua years later would go on to play in the Radiators.

Their first single, "Better Things to Do" b/w "Sorry," was released in 1966 on Frank Udoe's local U-DOE Records label and both sides received airplay on local radio stations. The band would record four more singles with the label. In 1967 the band decided to bring in Ray Morvant on piano and organ and Doug Davis on 12-string guitar, augmenting their sound with soul-influenced approach, yet retaining a Byrds-influenced folk rock sound. That year they released "No Comin' Back" b/w "Barbara" on the White Cliffs label (also owned by Udoe) followed by "Gas Station Boogaloo Downtown" b/w "Looking Everywhere" in 1968. Faber and Acomb departed in 1968. The group's final roster would retain Bua, Morvant, and Miller, but add new bassist Bobby Fonseca. The band continued performing for more than another year, releasing one more single "Gas Station Boogaloo Downtown" b/w "Looking Everywhere" on Udoe's Rae label, but finally broke up in 1970.

In the late 1970s drummer Frank Bua and guitarist Camile Baudoin (previously of the Souls of the Slain) joined the Radiators, and would enjoy many years of success with the popular roots rock and funk act. Gear Fab Records released the group's entire recorded output, including both sides of all five singles and additional unreleased and alternate tracks, as the single disc The Palace Guards in 2007.

== Membership ==
- Les Gray (vocals)
- Glenn Acomb (guitar)
- Jeff Miller (guitar)
- Richie Faber (bass)
- Frank Bua (drums)
- Ray Morvant (piano, organ and guitar)
- Doug Davis (12-string guitar)
- Bobby Fonseca (bass)

== Discography ==
- "Sorry" b/w "Better Things to Do" (U-Doe 104, June 1966)
- "No Comin' Back" b/w "Barbara" (White Cliffs 269, August 1967)
- "Gas Station Boogaloo Downtown" b/w "Looking Everywhere" (White Cliffs 286, 1968)
- "Gas Station Boogaloo Downtown" b/w "Looking Everywhere" (Rae 103 1969)
