= Oh Yeah! The Best of Dunwich Records =

Compilation album
- Released: 1991
- Recorded: 1960s
- Genre: Garage rock; psychedelic rock; folk rock; proto-punk
- Length: 1:11:57
- Label: Sundazed

chronology
| Oh Yeah! The Best of Dunwich Records | If You're Ready! The Best of Dunwich Records...Volume 2 |

Oh Yeah! The Best of Dunwich Records is a garage rock compilation issued by Sundazed Music featuring music made by acts who recorded for Dunwich Records in Chicago during the 1960s. Dunwich quickly became one of the top independent labels in Chicago and, with national distribution through Atco Records, enjoyed hits by artists such as the American Breed and the Shadows of Knight, who were some of the best-known acts in garage rock, and are included here, along with the Del-Vetts, another well-known act. The set represents the stylistic diversity of the genre, featuring cuts that range from harder-edged and blues-based numbers to more pop-oriented fare. Some of the tracks display folk rock and psychedelic influences and there are a few advertising jingles, which appeared local radio stations, as well as an interview with the Shadows of Knight thrown in for good measure. The packaging includes thorough and we-researched liner notes by Jeff Jarema that provide information for the acts and their songs.

The set begins with an alternate take of The Shadows of Knight's version Bo Diddley's "Oh Yeah", which provided the group with a minor nationwide hit. The Shadows of Knight appear again in "Light Bulb Blues" and "Potato Chip"—the latter of which is preceded by an interview with the band. The Warner Brothers were from Minneapolis, not Chicago, but recorded for Dunwich and are represented in several cuts including "Lonely", "I Won't Be the Same Without Her", and a version of Goffin and King's "I Won't Be the Same Without Her". The Knaves, like the Shadows of Knight, specialized in a blues-based style of garage rock and do five songs including "The Girl I Threw Away", "Tease Me", and "Your Stuff". The Del-Vetts were one of the best-known Dunwich groups, and their first cut is the stereo mix of the fuzz-driven "Last Time Around", followed by "Everytime". They are featured on several other tracks such as the Dylan influenced ballad, "That's the Way It Is", and a song they recorded as the Pride and Joy, "Girl". The Little Boy Blues's intense, pounding "The Great Train Robbery" is included along with the soul-influenced "You Dove Deep in My Soul. The Bansheess "Project Blue" is the set's rawest cut, punctuated by a cathartic mixture of screaming vocals and relentless playing. According to the liner notes Frank Bucaro, who is responsible for the track's "loose screw" screaming lead vocal, later became a Catholic priest.

== Track listing ==
1. The Shadows of Knight: "Oh Yeah" (Ellas McDaniel) 2:42
2. The Warner Brothers: "Lonely" 2:10
3. The Knaves: "The Girl I Threw Away" 2:41
4. The Del-Vetts: "Last Time Around" 2:35
5. The Del-Vetts: "Everytime" 1:54
6. The Rovin' Kind: "My Generation" (Pete Townshend) 2:39
7. The Sounds Unlimited Orchestra: "Gotta Get Away" 2:26
8. Saturday's Children: "Radio Spot" 1:00
9. The Mauds: "Searchin'" 2:51
10. The Del-Vetts: "That's the Way It Is" 2:08
11. The Warner Brothers: "I Won't Be the Same Without Her" (Gerry Goffin/Carole King) 2:42
12. Saturday's Children: "Man With Money" 2:03
13. The Del-Vetts: "I Call My Baby STP" 2:11
14. The American Breed: "Radio Spot" 0:37
15. The Banshees: "Project Blue" 2:30
16. The Shadows of Knight: "Light Bulb Blues" (Jerry McGeorge/Jim Sohns) 2:34
17. The Knaves: "Tease Me" 2:16
18. The Little Boy Blues: "The Great Train Robbery" 2:37
19. The Sounds Unlimited Orchestra: "A Girls as Sweet as You" 2:24
20. Saturday's Children: "Leave That Baby Alone" 2:27
21. The Pride and Joy: "Girl" 1:59
22. The American Breed: "Radio Spot" 1:25
23. The Knaves: "Leave Me Alone" 2:33
24. The Little Boy Blues: "You Dove Deep in My Soul" 3:40
25. H.P. Lovecraft: "Radio Spot" 1:00
26. The Mauds: "You Don't Know Like I Know" 2:47
27. The Knaves: Inside Outside 2:01
28. The Knaves: "Your Stuff" 2:10
29. The Rovin' Kind: "She" (Tommy Boyce and Bobby Hart) 2:40
30. The Shadows of Knight: "Uncle Wiggley's Airship"/Interview 6:25
31. The Shadows of Knight: "Potato Chip"

== Catalogue and release information ==
- ''Oh Yeah! The Best of Dunwich Records '' (Sundazed SC11010, 1991)
