= Ed Wool =

American singer-songwriter

- Born: Edward Leonard Wool, Jr.
- Origin: Watertown, New York, United States
- Genres: Blues-rock
- Occupations: Singer, guitarist, song writer, recording artist
- Instrument: Guitar
- Labels: United Artists, RCA Victor, Cameo-Parkway, Diamond, Epic, ABC, Columbia, Nashville Recordings, Arabellum Independent

Edward Leonard Wool Jr., the son of concert pianist Claudine Lucas Wool, is an American electric blues guitar virtuoso, singer, songwriter, multi-instrumentalist, and recording artist from Watertown, New York. Wool has recorded with several bands on six major record labels. In the 1980s he moved to Albany, New York, and has continued writing, recording, and performing.

== Career ==
Wool's first band, Ed Wool and The Nomads, was active in northeast America in the 1960s and 1970s. In the book "Fuzz, Acid, and Flowers," a retrospective of the late '60s music scene, there is a chapter on Ed Wool stating that he was and continues to be an influential guitarist in northeast America. His guitar playing is intuitive, and reflects his love for Texas and Chicago Electric Blues, but with an edgier style, and highly developed technique. Wool has recorded with United Artists, RCA, Cameo-Parkway, Epic/Diamond, ABC Records, and Columbia Records. Although scoring high with his recording of "Valleri" produced on Epic/Records by Michael Joyce, he is probably best known for the WOOL album recorded on ABC Records and produced by David Rosner and Margo Guryan with some help from Neil Diamond.

His compositions and recordings have been used on major television shows and in several movies, including MGM's "HENDRIX". In 2006, the WOOL album originally recorded on ABC Records in 1969, was re-released as an import by Cherry Red/Delay 68 Records in London, England, and Amazon.

In 2011, he was voted the best blues guitarist in the Capital Region (Albany, NY), and won the King of The Blues contest.

Also in 2011, the WOOL album, produced by David Rosner and Margo Guryan, was released digitally by OGLIO Records on iTunes and 300 other online music stores.

In 2012 Ed Wool and The BeBaBlues Band won 70% of the popular vote at the CDBN Blues Band Shootout.

In 2013 Wool, and record producer Michael Joyce, began working on his next album, traveling between the famous Muscle Shoals Sound Studio in Alabama, and Subcat Studios in Syracuse, New York.

== Discography ==
- 1964 Audition Recordings United Artists as Ed Wool and The Nomads
- 1965 RCA Victor Records as Ed Wool and The Nomads, 45 RPM, "I Need Somebody" / "Please Please (Don't Go)".
- 1966 Cameo-Parkway Records as The Sure Cure, 45 RPM, "Anything You Want" / "I Wanna Do It".
- 1967 Diamond/Epic Records as The Pineapple Heard, 45 RPM, "Valleri" / "Ol' Man River", Diamond Records #D-231, BMI 2:20.
- 1968-69 ABC Records as WOOL, 45 RPM, "Love, Love, Love, Love, Love" / "If They Left Us Alone Now". 45 RPM, "Combination Of The Two" / "The Boy With The Green Eyes".
- 1969 ABC Records as WOOL - Album, "WOOL".
- 1970-73 Columbia Records as WOOL, 45 RPM, "Listen To The Sound" / "The Witch". 45 RPM, "It's Alright" / "Take Me To The Pilot". 45 RPM, "I Got The Feeling (Oh No)" / "In The Rest Of My Life".
- 1982 Nashville Recordings as Ed Wool
- 1994 Arabellum Independent as The Ed Wool Band
- 2006 Delay68 as WOOL, CD re-issue of the 1969 album "WOOL"
- 2011 Oglio Records as WOOL, digital release of the 1969 album "WOOL"

== Equipment ==
1962-1965: Silvertone Twin Twelve amp, '59 Les Paul Special,'62 Fender Bassman Amp, Fender Jazzmaster, Fender Jaguar, Rickenbacker Capri 335, Gretsch Tennessean

1965-1967: VOX AC100 (Not the solid state Super-Beatle) tube amp, Orange Gretsch 6120, Sunburst Gretsch Viking

1967-1970: SUNN 100s amp, SUNN 1000s amp, Cadillac Green Gretsch Viking

1970-1976: 1967 Epiphone Sheraton (Cherry then White), 1971 Les Paul Deluxe Guitar, 1957 Les Paul Black Beauty ('Fretless Wonder'), Martin D-41 Guitar, 1972 SUNN Model-T Amp

1976-1987: 1967 Epiphone Sheraton, 1981 Black Gibson 347, '62 Fender Stratocaster, 1977 Mesa Boogie Mark I amp, Marshall Jubilee Combo Amp,

1987-1992: 1987 Red Warmoth SuperStrat Guitar, 1982 Fender Super Champ Amp, 1986 Mesa BassMaster Amp, 1996 Mesa Blue Angle amp head

1992-1999: 1981 Mesa Studio 22Plus Amp, 1996 Mesa Blue Angel Amp, Fender Tone Master Amp, Mesa Dual Rectifier Amp, and 1987 Warmoth Guitar

1999–Present: 1998 Rivera Fandango Amp(Late '60's Plexi and '59 Tweed Bassman / Twin Pre-amps), 2004 Acoustic Echo Amp, 2002 Fender BassBreaker Amp (Fender Custom Shop: based on 1959 "High-powered Tweed Twin Amp", 1967 Fender Custom Vibrolux amp, 2003 Soldano Avenger amp, 2004 Marshall 2000 DSL amp, 2006 Ibanez 427 Guitar for SLIDE, 2001 Guild DV52 acoustic guitar, and 1987 Warmoth Red Tint SuperStrat Guitar
