= No Chance Baby! =

Compilation album by Oscar and the Majestics
- Released: July 26, 2011
- Recorded: 1963–1968
- Genre: Garage rock; psychedelic rock
- Length: 33:45
- Label: Sundazed

No Chance Baby! is a retrospective album by the American garage rock band Oscar and the Majestics and was released on July 26, 2011 on Sundazed Music. The album compiles all of the group's released material that was previously available to only a handful of collectors.

During their heyday, Oscar and the Majestics enjoyed regional success under the leadership of lead guitarist and vocalist Oscar Hamod. Marked by their utilization of distorted guitar instrumentals, the group eventually signed a recording contract with USA Records. Though the three singles recorded during this stint exemplified Oscar and the Majestics' growth as musicians, the record label's capitulation prevented the band from reaching a national audience. Further releases followed on independent record labels, however by 1969 the group disbanded with their surviving singles, particularly those distributed by USA, becoming prizes among record collectors.

The band's music was beginning to be uncovered thanks to five of their tracks being compiled on 2131 South Michigan Avenue: 60's Garage & Psychedelia from USA and Destination Records in 2009. No Chance Baby! opens with "Got to Have Your Lovin'", an Oscar Hamod-penned song that exemplifies the band's transitional period into psychedelia. Another track by Hamod, "No Chance Baby", is a favorite among Oscar and the Majestics' original material and was the first on the USA label. Much of the album's contents resembles the group's influences taken from the Kinks and the Who, particularly in their early R&B compositions. Another musical highlight is "House of the Rising Sun 1969" which showed the band's utilization of fuzz-toned instrumentals coming full circle. The two songs, "Baby Under My Skin” and “I Feel Good”, were previously unreleased recordings from the group's USA stint.

Upon release, No Chance Baby! revived Oscar and the Majestics' complete discography, and another reunion of former band members. The album was ranked at number three on Rolling Stone Magazine's list of reissue albums.

== Track listing ==
1. "Got to Have Your Lovin'" (Oscar Hamod) - 2:35
2. "Soulfinger" (Jimmy King, Phalon Jones, Carl Cunningham, Ben Cauley, Ronnie Caldwell, James Alexander) - 2:30
3. "My Girl Is Waiting " (Hamod) - 2:23
4. "Baby Under My Skin" (Hamod) - 2:23
5. "I Can't Explain" (Pete Townshend) - 2:12
6. "Jackie Jackie" (Hamod) - 2:12
7. "Why-O" (Hamod) - 2:31
8. "No Chance Baby" (Hamod) - 2:34
9. "I Feel Good" (Hamod, Sam Hamod) - 2:29
10. "Come on Willie" (Hamod) - 2:10
11. "Top Eliminator" (Hamod) - 2:01
12. "Fanny Brown" (Hamod) - 2:14
13. "Dawn" (Bobby Robinson) - 2:16
14. "House of the Rising Sun 1969" (traditional, arranged by Hamod) - 2:39

== Personnel ==
- Oscar Hamod - lead vocals, lead guitar
- Sam Hamod - bass guitar, backing vocals
- Robert Wheeler - rhythm guitar, backing vocals
- Vince Jacim - drums
