= Ponderosa Stomp =

Annual American roots music festival

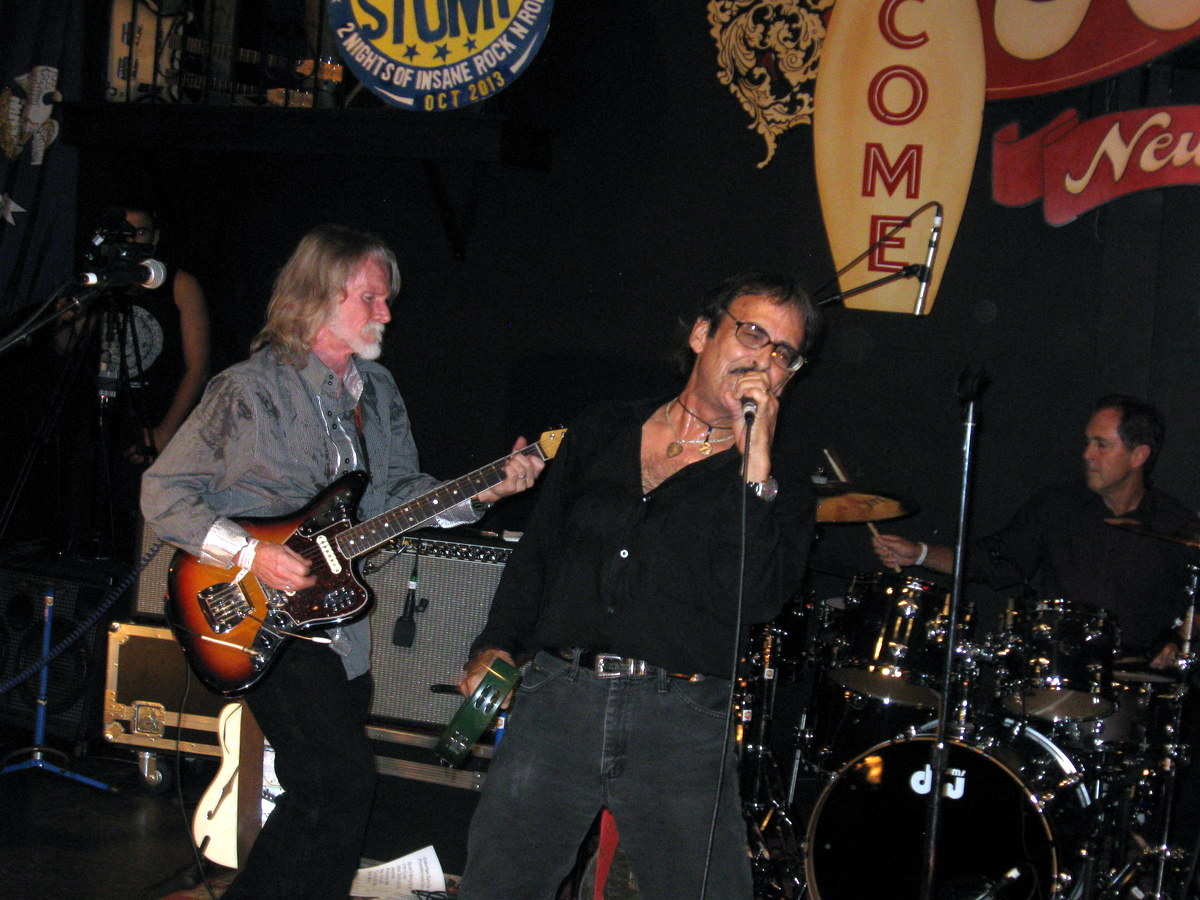
- The_Gaunga_Dyns performing at Ponderosa Stomp 2013, Rock 'n Bowl, New Orleans.
- Genre: Rock and roll, Country, Blues, Jazz, Swamp pop, Soul
- Dates: Two nights in end of April or early May
- Locations: New Orleans, Louisiana, Memphis, Tennessee
- Years active: 2002–2004, 2006–2018, 2021–
- Founders: The Ponderosa Stomp Foundation (Mystic Knights of the Mau-Mau)
- Website: Ponderosastomp.com

The Ponderosa Stomp is an annual American roots music festival dedicated to "recognizing the architects of rock-n-roll, blues, jazz, country, swamp pop and soul music." It was founded in New Orleans in 2002 and produced by the non-profit Mystic Knights of the Mau Mau (MK Charities, Inc & Ponderosa Stomp Foundation), a 501(c) 3 cultural organization dedicated to preserving and presenting the history of American roots music.

The Festival now takes place in New Orleans in September of each year, having formerly been held in between two weekends of New Orleans Jazz & Heritage Festival. The first Festival was held at the Fine Arts Center in New Orleans' Garden District. The next three Festivals took place at the Mid City Rock n' Bowl. In 2006, it temporarily moved to Memphis due to the effect of Hurricane Katrina. The Festival moved back to New Orleans the following year and was held at the House of Blues in the French Quarter. The 2021 Stomp is being held in September at the Howlin' Wolf in New Orleans; since 2019, this festival has been on hiatus.

The Festival was named after a song by Lazy Lester who also has appeared at the Festival.

The Ponderosa Stomp Foundation organizes varied programming, ranging from music education initiatives in public schools and museums to the signature annual concert event, The Ponderosa Stomp. It is a project of MK Charities, Inc. a 501(c) (3), non-profit educational organization.
