= The Novas =

American garage rock band

Background information
- Origin: Dallas/Fort Worth, Texas, United States
- Genres: Garage rock; folk rock
- Years active: 1963–1968
- Label: S.T.A.R.
- Past members: John Salih; David Browne; Mike Mullen; Gary Madrigal; David Dennard

Novas were an American garage rock band from Dallas/Fort Worth, Texas, who were active in the 1960s. Noted for their harmonies, they became one of the most popular bands in the local area and toured throughout the Texas, Oklahoma, and Louisiana region, enjoying a following outside of their immediate vicinity. The group released a single featuring the song "William Junior" in 1966. In the intervening years since their breakup, the Novas' music has come to the attention of garage rock collectors and enthusiasts and their collected work is included on two anthologies.

== History ==
The Novas were made up of members from Dallas and Fort Worth, Texas and formed in 1963 when guitarists John Salih and David Browne began playing as a duo, eventually expanding into a combo by adding Mike Mullen on bass and Gary Madrigal on drums. They adopted the name the Novas, taken after the popular compact-sized automobile of the time, the Chevrolet Nova. The band specialized in playing popular surf rock instrumentals of the day made popular by acts such a s the Ventures, the Surfaris, and the Astronauts and did some vocal numbers by Chuck Berry as well as "Louie Louie" by the Kingsmen. They made their first impression at a Junior High School talent show when they were cheered on by screaming girls, in similar fashion to the euphoria surrounding the Beatles' recent inaugural visit to the United States in February 1964. They became the most popular band at their school and eventually in the Dallas/Fort Worth area. They eventually developed a sound which included rich vocal harmonies, which enabled them to do songs that most bands could not do and earned them a reputation as having the best harmonies of any rock band in North Texas. The Novas used black 1950s model Cadillac hearse with their band's logo painted on the side to travel from gig to gig and carry their equipment. The band played at popular clubs in the Dallas and Fort Worth area. Several establishments were teen clubs such as Panther Hall, Teen a Go Go, the Action a Go Go, as well as the infamous adult strip club the Cellar, which clandestinely allowed teenage groups to perform.

In 1965, due to parental pressure, Mike Mullen departed and the group brought in David Dennard, previously of the surf band the Esquires, as his replacement. The Novas showcased a wide range of influences as disparate as the Beatles, the Rolling Stones, the Beach Boys, the Kinks, the Yardbirds, the Who, as well as much of the soul music popular at the time. The band grew their hair to reflect the longer Beatle-inspired look, but it caused them problems for in the straight and conservative Texas, where the crew-cut still held sway and where the mere sight of bangs and hair grown just over the tops of men's ears was still considered shocking.

The group began writing their own songs and in 1966 released a single on Dallas' S.T.A.R. label, featuring two of their self-penned numbers, "William Junior" which was rife with social commentary about a child of privilege backed with "And It's Time." The Novas played at local venues such as the Studio club and Market Hall and toured, often traveling in a station wagon on a shoestring budget, staying at motels, playing gigs throughout Texas, Louisiana, Arkansas, and Oklahoma. On March 25, 1966 the Novas made a lip-synched appearance on the local TV show Sump'n Else along with the 13th Floor Elevators and played on the same bill with the 13th Floor Elevators that night at the "Spring Clean Up" show held at Market Hall. The Novas opened for the Byrds, the Hollies, Paul Revere & the Raiders, Mitch Ryder, the Spencer Davis Group, Sonny & Cher, and the Blues Magoos. The band recorded a number of unreleased songs, including material for a single that was intended for release in 1968 for the G.P.C. label, but never saw the light of day. With college looming the Novas broke up following high school graduation in 1968.

The Novas' music has come to the attention of garage rock collectors and enthusiasts, and their collected recordings appear on the 1996 anthologies The Sump'n Else Tapes put out by Collectibles Records and William Junior, released on the Distortions label. Former band members are interviewed in Melissa Kirkendall's documentary Teen a Go Go.

== Membership ==
- John Salih (guitar and vocals)
- David Browne (guitar and vocals)
- Mike Mullen (bass and vocals)
- Gary Madrigal (drums and vocals)
- David Dennard (bass and vocals)

== Discography ==
=== 45 rpm ===
- "And It's Time" b/w "William Junior" (S.T.A.R. 001, 1966)

=== Compilation ===
- Sump'n' Else Tapes (Collectables, 1996)
