= The Stillroven =

American garage rock and psychedelic band

Background information
- Origin: Robbinsdale, Minnesota, United States
- Genres: Garage rock; folk rock; psychedelic rock
- Years active: 1965-1969
- Labels: Falcon, August, A&M
- Past members: John Howarth; Mark Moorhead; Rock Peterson; Dave Dean; Phil Berdahl; Danny Kane; Jim Larkin; Dave Berget; Mike O'Gara; Mike Flaherty; Dave Rivkin

The Stillroven were an American garage rock and psychedelic band from Robbinsdale, Minnesota, outside of Minneapolis, who were active in 1965–1969. They became a local success, enjoying a hit in the Twin Cites area with their version of "Hey Joe". In hopes of reaching a wider audience they relocated, playing for a short time in Tucson, Arizona, but eventually moved their base of operations to Denver, Colorado, where they briefly signed to A&M Records, recording an unreleased album for the label. The group made recordings at Norman Petty Recording Studios in Clovis, New Mexico, before moving to Washington, DC in 1969 and auditioning in New York City to secure another recording arrangement that never materialized. In the intervening years since their breakup in 1969, the group's work has attracted the attention of garage rock and psychedelic enthusiasts and has been included on various re-issues and compilations.

== History ==
=== Minnesota ===
The Stillroven was founded by students at Robbinsdale High School in Robbinsdale, Minnesota, a suburb of Minneapolis in 1965 and was at first known as the Syndicate. Their original lineup consisted of John Howarth and Mark Moorhead on guitars, Rock Peterson on bass, Dave Dean on keyboards, and Phil Berdahl on drums. Lead vocals usually alternated between various band members. It was soon after Mark Moorhead departed in 1966 that the band decided to change their name to the Stillroven. They recruited Danny Kane as his replacement on guitar.

It was also at this time that they met local disc jockey Peter Huntington May who would become their manager and produce their records. In 1966 they went to a studio located in a basement to cut their first single, "She's My Woman" b/w their version of "(I'm Not Your) Stepping Stone," which was released on the Falcon label. Only 50 promotional copies were pressed for radio stations. However, their next single cut at Dove Recording Studio in Bloomington, Minnesota featured a raucous version of "Hey Joe" b/w "Sunny Day," and gained significantly more exposure than their first, becoming a hit in the Minneapolis area. The success of the single was not enough prevent Peterson and Kane from departing in 1967. They were replaced with Jim Larkin on rhythm guitar and Dave Berget on bass. Their next single, "Little Picture Playhouse" b/w "Cast Thy Burden Upon the Stone," displayed the hallucinogenic influence of psychedelia. The band opened for Sonny and Cher (though Cher could not attend due to an illness) at the Minneapolis Auditorium.

=== Relocating to West ===
Still, the band failed to gain traction outside of the Minneapolis area, a difficulty compounded by their manager's decision to move to Tucson, Arizona and conduct their affairs from a distance. Larkin and Berget left the band not long after they had arrived and were replaced by Mike O'Gara on guitar and Mike Flaherty of bass. In 1968, with O'Gara and Flaherty now in the lineup, they recorded a version Moby Grape's "Come in the Morning" b/w "Necessary Person," which were both sung by O'Gara, but due to internal dissention in the group, the single was pulled after the first hundred copies were printed and then re-released with another cover version but this time of the Small Faces' "Tell Me Have You Ever Seen Me" with Dave Berget on vocals, which replaced "Come in the Morning" as the A-side. This would be the band's last original release.

The band traveled to Tucson, Arizona, where for two months they were booked at the Dunes on Speedway Blvd. On April 16 they performed as an opening act for Buffalo Springfield at the Dunes and would regularly appear there through May. In July Mike Flaherty left the band and Dave Berget rejoined. The band signed under new management with James Reardon and Associates. They continued to do shows in Tucson and even scored a deal A&M Records to record an album, which they recorded, but which has never been released. In November, the Stillroven moved their base of operations to Denver, Colorado. In April 1969 they went to Clovis, New Mexico to record several songs, which included a cover of the Temptations' "Get Ready," at Norman Petty Recording Studios, where Buddy Holly and Roy Orbison had recorded many of their hits with Petty in the 1950s.

=== East coast ===
In May 1969 the band traveled to Washington, DC to stay at the home of Bonnie Diamond, who had met the band earlier in Aspen, Colorado and who was known as a "jet setter" with connections in the music business. She arranged for them to audition for producer Phil Ramone and record executives from Electra Records in New York City. They were asked to audition and later record a cover version of a song from the Broadway play, Oh! Calcutta! Having no interest in recording the song, they turned down the arrangement and briefly returned to Washington, DC. They were offered a residency in New York at the Scene in Greenwich Village, but rejected it due to the early morning time slot. With a final lineup consisting of Phil Berdahl, Dave Dean, Dave Berget, Mike O’Gara, and Dave Rivkin, and with Berdahl and Dean as the only two original band members, the band finally returned to Minnesota, playing their last gig in July 1969 at a club called the Prison in Burnsville. Shortly thereafter the band broke up.

=== Post-breakup ===
In the intervening years following their breakup, the band's work has come to the attention of garage rock and psychedelic enthusiasts and collectors. An anthology of their work, Cast Thy Burden Upon the Stillroven, was released on Sundazed Music in 1996. In addition to their better known songs, the album included numerous previously unreleased tracks. In 2005, the unissued album recorded for A & M in 1968 was released on the CD, Too Many Spaces.

== Membership ==
- John Howarth (guitar and vocals)
- Mark Moorhead (guitar)
- Rock Peterson (bass and vocals)
- Dave Dean (keyboards and vocals)
- Phil Berdahl (drums and vocals)
- Danny Kane (guitar and vocals)
- Jim Larkin (rhythm guitar and vocals)
- Dave Berget (bass and vocals)
- Mike O'Gara (guitar and vocals)
- Mike Flaherty (bass and vocals)
- David Bruce Rivkin (lead guitar and vocals)

== Discography ==
=== Albums ===
- Cast Thy Burden Upon the Stillroven (Sundazed, 1996)
- Too Many Spaces (Sundazed, 2003)

=== Singles ===
- "She's My Woman" b/w "(I'm Not Your) Stepping Stone" (Falcon 6–7926, December 1966)
- "Hey Joe" b/w "Sunny Day" (Falcon 69, April 1967) (Roulette 4748, June 1967)
- "Little Picture Playhouse" b/w "Cast Thy Burden Upon the Stone," (August 101, November 1967)
- "Come in the Morning" b/w "Necessary Person" (August 102, June 1968)
- "Tell Me Have You Ever Seen Me" b/w "Necessary Person" (August 102, June 1968)
