= Oscar and the Majestics =

1960s American garage punk band

- Also known as: Oscar Hamod and the Majestics
- Origin: Gary, Indiana, United States
- Genres: Garage punk
- Years active: 1960-1969
- Labels: Ark; USA; Soulful
- Past members: Oscar Hamod; Sam Hamod; Bud Hamod; Robert Wheeler; Vince Jakimzak

Oscar and the Majestics were an American garage punk band formed in Gary, Indiana in 1960. The band, led by Oscar Hamod, achieved regional acclaim and produced seven well-regarded singles in their heyday. As the group progressed, they experimented with psychedelic rock and soul influences which led to their most acclaimed piece, a cover song deemed "House of the Rising Sun 1969".

== History ==
In 1960, Oscar Hamod, the lead vocalist, guitarist, and prime songwriter, formed the first lineup of the band, Oscar and the Majestics. Hamod took inspiration from his time spent at his father's nightclub, The Broadway Lounge, which was a venue for acts like Jimmy Reed and Albert King. After self teaching himself to play guitar, Hamod recruited his brothers Sam Hamod on bass guitar and Bud Hamod on drums. Soon after performing in local gigs, Bud Hamod dropped out of the band. The definitive lineup was complete when the band added Robert Wheeler on rhythm guitar and Vince Jacim as replacement on drums. The group would produce a distinct fuzz sound that, as Oscar Hamod said, "My original 58 Gibson Explorer guitar has a lot to do with my fuzz guitar sound. I would drive my Fender amp to the limit slightly below the speakers, which created my unique fuzz sound".

Oscar Hamod was an expert at promoting the band, and it was not long before they were performing in clubs and dance halls throughout the Northwest region. They gained a large local following, and Oscar Hamod looked to capitalize on the success with a debut single. The band released their first single, "Jackie Jackie" b/w "Fanny Brown", on Oscar Hamod's own self-financed Ark label in 1964. Oscar Hamod was the composer, and it would remain that way for all the band's original material, except for Sam Hamod's piece, "I Feel Good". Several other singles were produced on the label, most notably "Come On Willie" which became a regional anthem in Indiana, until the band leaped to the Chicago-based USA label. All of their material from this point was recorded at Chess Studios in Chicago.

The band's first USA label release was "No Chance Baby" b/w "My Baby Is Waiting". It was a prime example of the group's hard rocking sound that was produced in their live performances. Each single on the label enhanced the group's prominence in the Northwestern area, and they were expecting to expand to a nationwide label. However, the USA label was failing financially and dropped the band from the label before their fourth single. The group went back to a self-produced label called Soulful Records, and they would release their final singles. The most prominent of the releases was the cover of House of the Rising Sun, which was a marker in the group's sound. It featured psychedelic rock influence, and a demonstration of Oscar Homad's expertise on the guitar. These final singles were largely ignored outside the band's hometown, and the group stopped recording in 1969. They continue to have reunion tours in Indiana and their singles have been a prize among record collectors.

In 2009, five tracks of Oscar and the Majestics were included on the compilation album, 2131 South Michigan Avenue, the most than any other on the album. In the summer of 2011, Sundazed Music released another compilation, named No Chance Baby!, that featured all of the band's released material, including two previously unreleased tracks. The two unreleased tracks, "Baby Under My Skin" and "I Feel Good", were recorded during the group's stint with the USA label. The album was also the first reissue of "House of the Rising Sun 1969", and the band supported the release by coming together for another reunion tour.
