= The Kreeg =

American garage rock band

Background information
- Origin: Albuquerque, New Mexico, United States
- Genre: Garage rock
- Years active: 1966-1968
- Label: Lance
- Past members: Bob Sturtcman; Hap Blackstock; Ray Trujillo; Larry Inks; Russ Sturtcman

The Kreeg were an American garage rock band from Albuquerque, New Mexico who were active in the 1960s. They were one of the most popular groups in the Albuquerque area and enjoyed local hits from both sides of their 1966 single "How Can I" b/w "Impressin'". Their work has come to the attention of garage rock enthusiasts with the release of the 1996 anthology Impressin', which features their complete recordings.

== History ==
The Kreeg formed in Albuquerque, New Mexico, in 1966, out of another earlier band known first as the Goldenaires then the Prophets. Their lineup consisted of Bob Sturtcman, who had previously played with another local band, the Goldenaires, on rhythm guitar and vocals, Hap Blackstock on bass and vocals, Larry Inks (lead guitar), and Russ Sturtcman on drums. Hap Blackstock was eventually replaced by Ray Trujillo on bass. When the Prophets decided to change their name, rhythm guitarist Bob Sturtcman came up with idea to call the band "the Blitzkrieg", but the group decided to shorten it, first to "the Krieg", then finally the Kreeg, mainly out concern for the numerous World War II veterans living in Albuquerque. Going back to the Prophets, the band was heavily influenced by the Beatles, but eventually started listening to some of the harder, more blues-based British bands such as the Rolling Stones, Them, the Yardbirds, the Kinks, and the Animals, as well as American folk rock and garage-oriented bands such as the Beau Brummels and the Leaves. The Kreeg developed a sound that combined blues and folk rock influences.

Bob Sturtcman wrote several songs, and the group recorded a few demos. The Kreeg were the first band signed to Dick Stewart's Albuquerque-based Lance Records, and their debut single, "How Can I" b/w "Impressin'", released in November 1966, supplied two minor local hits and sold well enough to convince Lance to sign more local rock bands, and eventually they became the home to many of the area's top groups. The Kreeg were popular in the Albuquerque area, making a steady living playing fraternity parties and high school homecoming dances. According to Bob Sturtcman: "...from local airplay, we garnered a lot of clout for bookings, which kept us busy every weekend". When lead guitarist Larry Inks decided to move to California the group began to disintegrate, and with Vietnam War draft looming, by the end of 1968 the Kreeg were no more. Bob Sturtcman later became an architect and lives in Ranchos de Taos, New Mexico. Russ Sturtcman died in 2014.

In the aftermath of the Kreeg, Bob and Russ Sturtcman played together in Mother Sturtcman's Jam and Jellies up through 1969, and that year released a single—a version of the Yardbirds' "For Your Love." They subsequently played in a band called Albatross, based in Taos, New Mexico, during the early 1970s. In the 1990s, the CD anthology, Impressin', featuring the Kreeg's complete recordings, including official releases, demos, and live tracks, was assembled by Bob Sturtcman and Dick Stewart and released on Collectables Records in 1996. The anthology has been noted for its informative liner notes and discography. "How Can I" and "Impressin'" were included on the Sixties Archives #4: Florida & New Mexico Punk on Eva Records in 1991. The song "Impressin'" was featured on Garage Beat '66 Volume 1: Like What, Me Worry?! released in 2004 by Sundazed Music.

== Membership ==
- Bob Sturtcman (rhythm guitar, vocals)
- Hap Blackstock (bass, vocals)
- Ray Trujillo (bass)
- Larry Inks (lead guitar)
- Russ Sturtcman (drums)

== Discography ==
- "How Can I" b/w "Impressin'" (Lance 2229, November 1966)

== Bibliography ==
- Markesich, Mike (2012). Teenbeat Mayhem (1st ed.). Branford, Connecticut: Priceless Info Press. ISBN 978-0-985-64825-1.
