= The Escapades =

American garage rock band

Background information
- Origin: Memphis, Tennessee, United States
- Genre: Garage rock
- Years active: 1963-1964, 1966-1967
- Labels: XL; Arbet; Verve
- Past members: Tommy Minga; Benny Kinser; Dale Roark; Ron Gorden; Ronnie Williamson

The Escapades were an American garage rock band from Memphis, Tennessee who were active in the 1960s. They became one of the most popular groups in the Memphis area during the mid-1960s and recorded two singles. "I Tell No Lies", the A-side of their debut single, became a big hit in Memphis and around the South. They were signed to Verve Records, who released their follow-up, "Mad, Mad, Mad", which featured a fuzz-toned guitar line. Their work is highly regarded by garage rock enthusiasts and collectors and has appeared on various compilations.

== History ==
=== Early history ===
The Escapades were founded by Tommy Minga in early 1963 in east Memphis, Tennessee. Their original lineup included Minga on vocals and Jerry Phillips on guitar, son of record producer and owner of Sun Records, Sam Phillips, as well as Billy Wulfers on bass, and Eddie Robinson on drums. Another member of the early version of the group was Jimmy Tartbutton. One of their chief competitors in the east Memphis scene was the Jesters, led by Teddy Paige, a student at Christian Brothers High. In 1964, when some of the members of his band went to college, the Jesters broke up. The Escapades also broke up at this time, but both groups would re-surface later with different lineups.

In 1965 Paige re-formed the Jesters, and brought in some of the former members of the Escapades: Minga and Phillips, as well as Billy Wulfers on bass and Eddie Robinson on drums. They went to Sun Studios to record a version of song written by Minga, "Cadillac Man", accompanied on piano by famed Memphis session man Jim Dickinson. However, Paige and producer Sam Phillips felt that the both "Cadillac Man" and its flipside needed a different kind of vocal and had Dickinson sing on both tracks, much to the chagrin of Minga.

=== Classic lineup of the Escapades ===
Minga soon left the Jesters to re-form a new version of the Escapades. He joined fellow students at Oakhaven High School, guitarist Benny Kisner, keyboardist Ron Gorden, and drummer Ronnie Williamson, along with bassist Dale Roark, who was attending Memphis State University. Sometimes the group would play at the Skateland Frayser roller skating rink. The Escapades were known for an exciting live show which included Ron Gorden's stage antics.According to Gorden:

We always got the crowd going... We loved to play the Roaring '60s, and I would be up on that high stage they had and dance while I played this Farfisa organ I had. As I danced, I would rock the organ like I was going to turn it over into the crowd. They would scream with each rock, but I never dropped it.

The group quickly became one of the most popular bands in the Memphis area. They recorded their first single "I Tell No Lies" b/w "She's the Kind" at John Fry's home garage studio, which was released on Stan Kessler's Arbet label. The record became a local hit and received airplay all over the south. MGM/Verve Records became interested in the group and picked up the record, re-releasing it on their XL label later that year. The group recorded their follow up "Mad, Mad, Mad" b/w "Try So Hard" at Sun Studios, which was issued on Verve in late 1966 and produced by Stan Kesler. The distinctive fuzz-toned guitar part in "Mad, Mad, Mad" was played by Memphis session man Tommy Cogbill. The band's manager, Johnny Dark, set up a tour of the Southeast accompanying Sam the Sham & the Pharos, the Swinging Medallions, Tommy Roe, and Napoleon the 14th. The second single failed to achieve the success of the first. Following the tour, the group returned to Memphis to play local gigs, but several of the band's members were drafted into the military to fight in Vietnam. Eventually, all of the band's members ended up in the service, except for Ron Gorden. In late 1967 the group broke up.

=== Later events ===
Gorden went on to play with a reconstituted version of the group the late Otis Redding's previous backup group, the Bar-Kays. Later Gorden was hired by Stax Records, working on several projects before eventually becoming their art director. He would go on to design album covers for over a hundred LPs on there and would win a Grammy for his art work on Issac Hayes' Black Moses.

In the intervening years, the Escapades work has come to the attention of garage rock enthusiasts and collectors. "I Tell No Lies" is included on Pebbles, Volume 5, issued by AIP Records, and A History of Garage & Frat Bands in Memphis 1960-1975, Vol. 1. "Mad, Mad, Mad" appears on the Destination Frantic, Volume 2 CD, put out by Zone 66 records. Several of their songs appear on the Jesters' anthology "Cadillac Men: The Sun Masters".

== Membership ==
- Tommy Minga (vocals)
- Benny Kinser (guitar)
- Dale Roark (bass)
- Ron Gorden (organ)
- Ronnie Williamson (drums)

== Discography ==
- "I Tell No Lies" b/w "She's the Kind" (Arbet 1010, February 1966) (XL 356, March 1966)
- "Mad, Mad, Mad" b/w "Try so Hard" (Verve 10415, May 1966)

== Bibliography ==
- Hall, Ron (2001). Playing for a Piece of the Door: A History of Garage & Frat Bands in Memphis 1960-1975 (1st ed.). Memphis: Sharngri-La Projects. ISBN 0-9668575-1-8.
- Markesich, Mike (2012). Teenbeat Mayhem (1st ed.). Branford, Connecticut: Priceless Info Press. ISBN 978-0-985-64825-1.
