= Randy and the Radiants =

American garage rock band

- Origin: Memphis, Tennessee, United States
- Genres: Garage rock; soul
- Years active: 1962–1966, 1976–1985
- Label: Sun
- Past members: Randy Haspel; Bob Simon; Howard Calhoun; Ed Marshal; Bill Slais; Mike Gardener; Toni Rossini; Donnie Baer

Randy and the Radiants (or Randy & the Radiants) were an American garage rock band from Memphis, Tennessee who were active from 1962 to 1966 and then again 1976–1984. They were one of the most popular groups in the Memphis area during the 1960s. Through their association with Knox Phillips, son of Sam Phillips, they signed with Sun Records and recorded two singles on the label which became hits in the region. Their second release, "My Way of Thinking", became one of the top hits in the area, reaching #1 on WGMN's charts. The group's work has today become highly regarded amongst garage rock enthusiasts and collectors.

== History ==
Randy and the Radiants were grew out of a band called the Embers. Randy Haspel and Bob Simon had played together since junior high in another band, the Casuals, led by Howard Calhoun. Calhoun had another group, which was the Embers. Haspel and Simon sung backup vocals in Embers, but eventually Haspel became their primary lead singer and front man, prompting the band to change their name to Randy and the Radiants. Their lineup settled into the following configuration: Haspel on guitar and lead vocals, Simon on rhythm guitar, and Calhoun on bass, along with Ed Marshal on lead guitar, Bill Slais on saxophone, and Mike Gardener on drums. Toni Rossini later joined on backing vocals. The band included self-written numbers in their repertoire, usually penned by Bob Simon, but sometimes by Randy Haspel. At the time, the most popular rock & roll band in Memphis was the Counts. The members of Randy and the Radiants sought to emulate the Counts, even so far as taking notes while watching them play live. According to Haspel: "Tommy Boggs [the Counts drummer] used to let me sit behind his drum set onstage and take notes and study them." However, with the arrival of the Beatles and the British Invasion, the group began to look across the Atlantic for inspiration. Because the various members in the band went to six different high schools, they were able to cull fans from multiple places, which turned out to be an advantage. They became a popular live act in the Memphis area, playing regularly at the T. Walker Lewis YMCA.

Eventually the group was so regularly-booked that they decided to hire a manager. They approached Johnny Dark, a disc jockey at WGMN, an AM station in Millington, Tennessee. WGMN had sponsored dances at the T. Walker Lewis YMCA, and the band had gotten to know their DJ's who would regularly host shows. Dark accepted their offer, and one of his first moves was to raise their asking price from $50 per gig to $500 a night. Dark got the band active in the college fraternity gig scene. When playing one show at Southwestern college, they met a student there, Knox Phillips, who arranged for them to audition for his father, Sam Phillips' label, Sun Records, which had launched the careers of Elvis Presley and so many of the most famous Memphis-based rockabilly stars of the 1950s. The band was signed to the label and recorded their first single for Sun released in 1965, "Peek-a-boo" backed with "Mountains High" which had previously been a hit for Dick and Dee Dee. The song became a moderate hit on WHBQ. The Gentrys were one of Randy and the Radiants' chief rivals in the competitive Memphis scene. Randy and the Radiants took part in several battles of the bands, even beating-out the Gentrys at T. Walker Lewis and the Counts on another occasion. They opened for the Dave Clark Five at the Mid-South Coliseum.

Later in 1965, the group released their sophomore single featuring the distorted Kinks-style power chord riffs of "My Way of Thinking" on the A-side, backed with "Truth from My Eyes", which demonstrated the group's versatility in attempting a stab at pure soul music. The song became a huge hit in Memphis, reaching #1 on WGMN's charts. Rival station WMPS was reluctant to play the song, in light of the band's association with Johnny Dark at WGMN, as well as an ongoing dispute with Sam Phillips and Sun, but Knox Phillips wrote and angry letter to station director Jack Parnell, which convinced him to play the song, and it reached #12 there. In late 1965 Randy Haspel's parents, who disapproved of his musician lifestyle, enrolled him into the University of Tennessee, forcing him to quit the band. The Radiants continued without him for a while longer into 1966 with Bob Simon on vocals, but the group soon broke up after Simon's parents enrolled him into college.

Eventually in 1968, Haspel dropped out of the University of Tennessee and moved to New York, where he cut some demos with noted Columbia record producer and A&R man, John Hammond. In 1969 Haspel was back in Memphis looking to establish himself as a solo act when Holiday Inn Records was being reinvigorated under the guidance and direction of Sam Phillips, who by then had sold Sun Records to focus instead on the Holiday Inn label owned by his friend, Kemmons Wilson, founder of both the label and the successful motel chain for which it was named. Haspel reunited with Bob Simon to recorded several songs we wrote for the sessions, which were produced by Knox Phillips and backed by established Memphis session players such as Teddy Paige and Chips Moman at American Studio. From these sessions the song "Good Company" was released as a single under the name, Robert and Randy.

In 1974 Randy and the Radiants re-united, and in 1977 they signed with Shoe Productions, who released "I Need a Vacation" on ABC Records b/w "Just Like You" ABC-12394. Shortly thereafter MCA bought out ABC and fired their whole A&R team, ending any hopes that the band would get the necessary promotion to push record. The band remained active until 1985, when on New Year's Eve, they played their final show at the Hard Rock Café in New York.

Randy Haspel started his own music publishing company and has continued to write and play music, making regular appearances in the Memphis area. Bob Simon has been active in recording, working regularly with Knox Phillips and has written numerous songs including hits for Reba McEntire. Bill Slais played in Elvin Bishop's band, as well as with Howard Calhoun, and has played with Solid Gold. Tony Rossini recorded several sides for Monument Records in the late 1960 and later teamed with Donna Wiess to form Tony & Terry and the Pirates. Mike Gardener played for years with Jimmy Buffett, as well as the Nitty Gritty Dirt Band. He has since passed away.

Randy and the Radiants work has come to the attention of garage rock enthusiasts, especially with the release of their Memphis Beat: The Sun Recordings 1964–1966 anthology released on Big Beat Records, which collects their entire recorded output consisting of the songs released as singles and numerous outtakes.

== Membership ==
- Randy Haspel (rhythm guitar and lead vocals)
- Bob Simon (rhythm guitar)
- Howard Calhoun (bass)
- Ed Marshal (lead guitar)
- Bill Slais (saxophone)
- Mike Gardener (drums)
- Toni Rossini (backing vocals)
- Donnie Baer (Lead guitar and vocals)

== Discography ==
- "Peek-a-Boo" b/w "Mountains High" (Sun 395, 1965)
- "My Way of Thinking" b/w "Truth from my Eyes" (Sun 398, 1965)
- "Just Like You" b/w "I Need a Vacation" (1977)

== Bibliography ==
- Hall, Ron (2001). Playing for a Piece of the Door: A History of Garage & Frat Bands in Memphis 1960–1975 (1st ed.). Memphis: Sharngri-La Projects. ISBN 0-9668575-1-8.
- Markesich, Mike (2012). Teenbeat Mayhem (1st ed.). Branford, Connecticut: Priceless Info Press. ISBN 978-0-985-64825-1.
