= The Shy Guys =

American garage rock band

- Origin: Oak Park, Michigan, United States
- Genres: Garage rock; folk rock
- Years active: 1960s
- Labels: Panick, Palmer, CanUSA
- Past members: Ron Nelson (Ron Lefko); Stu "Hirshfield" Howard; Marty Lewis; Mark Finn

The Shy Guys were an American garage rock band from Oak Park, Michigan who were active in the 1960s. They are known for songs such as "We Gotta Go," which became a hit in Detroit and the southern Michigan area, and also in the Buffalo, New York region.

They hailed from Oak Park, Michigan, a suburb of Detroit. Their lineup consisted of Ron Nelson (Ron Lefko) lead guitar and vocals, Stu "Hirshfield" Howard on guitar and vocals, Marty Lewis on bass, Mark Finn on drums. Initially the group covered songs made popular by acts such as the Beatles, the Rolling Stones, the Beach Boys.

The Shy Guys cut their first single "We Gotta Go" b/w "Lay It on the Line," which appeared on the Panik label, owned by Joe Revaz from Detroit, where other garage acts such as the Rainy Days and the Human Beings had previously recorded. "We Gotta Go" became a hit in southeastern Michigan and in Buffalo, New York, where it was played regularly by DJ Scotty Regan after his relocation from Detroit. "We Gotta Go" and "Lay it on the Line," were also released on the local Palmer label with the band's second single, "A Love So True" b/w "Where You Belong." At the peak of the band's popularity they opened for the Dave Clark Five and Sam the Sham & the Pharaohs when those bands played in the Chicago area. The Shy Guys next single was a cover of a cover of The Byrds' "Feel a Whole Lot Better," which appeared on the CanUSA label in 1968, but it failed to achieve success. They cut two more songs "Love So True" and "About You" that went unreleased. The band's momentum dwindled and they broke up later that year.

== Membership ==
- Ron Nelson (Ron Lefko) (lead guitar, vocals)
- Stu "Hirshfield" Howard (guitar, vocals)
- Marty Lewis (bass)
- Mark Finn (drums)

== Discography ==
- "We Gotta Go" b/w "Lay It on the Line" (Panik 5111, May 1966) (Palmer 5005, June 1966)
- "A Love So True" b/w "Where You Belong" (Palmer 5008, September 1966)
- "I'll Feel a Whole Lot Better" b/w "Without You" (CanUSA 503, 1968)
