= The Jesters (Memphis band) =

American garage rock band

- Origin: Memphis, Tennessee, United States
- Genres: Garage rock; rockabilly; blues
- Years active: 1963-1964 1965-1967
- Label: Sun
- Past members: Teddy Paige; Tommy Minga; Jerry Phillips; Eddie Robertson; Billy Wulfers

The Jesters were an American garage rock band from Memphis, Tennessee who were active between 1963-1964 and 1965–1967. They became one of the most popular groups in the Memphis area during the time. Led by Teddy Paige, they were unique amongst garage bands of the time in that they did not display any of the musical influences of the Beatles and the British Invasion, but reflected rather the a style of early rock and roll, rockabilly, and blues. Their work has attracted the interest of garage rock enthusiasts in recent years.

The original version of Jesters was founded by Teddy Paige in 1963 in Memphis, Tennessee, when he was a student at Christian Brothers High School. The Jesters quickly became one of the most popular bands in east Memphis and one of their chief competitors was the Escapades, who were led by Tommy Minga. In 1964, after some of the members of the Jesters left for college, the band broke up. Their rivals, the Escapades, also disbanded around this time. But, in 1965 Paige decided to re-form the Jesters, and brought in former members from the Escapades: Minga on vocals and Jerry Phillips, son of record producer and owner of Sun Records, Sam Phillips on guitar, as well as Billy Wulfers on bass, and Eddie Robertson on drums. Unlike most garage bands of the era, the Jesters' sound was not influenced by the Beatles and the British Invasion, but rather firmly rooted in early rock and roll, Memphis rockabilly, as well as the blues.

The Jesters went to Sun Studios to record a number of cuts including a version of a song written by Minga, "Cadillac Man", where the group was accompanied on piano by famed Memphis session man Jim Dickinson. However, Paige and producer Sam Phillips felt that the both "Cadillac Man" and the song to become its flipside, "My Babe", needed a different kind of lead vocal and enlisted Dickinson, instead of Minga, to sing on both tracks—much to the chagrin of Minga, who soon departed to re-form a new version of the Escapades. "Cadillac Man" received good local airplay, but did not gain wider exposure. The Jesters broke up in 1967.

The Jesters' work has come to the attention of garage rock and roots music enthusiasts. Their complete recordings have been released on the anthology Cadillac Men: The Sun Masters issued by Big Beat Records.

== Membership 1965-1967 ==
- Teddy Paige (guitar)
- Tommy Minga (lead vocals)
- Jerry Phillips (guitar)
- Billy Wulfers (bass)
- Eddie Robertson (drums)

== Discography ==
- "Cadillac Man" b/w "My Babe" (Sun 400, 1965)

== Bibliography ==
- Hall, Ron (2001). Playing for a Piece of the Door: A History of Garage & Frat Bands in Memphis 1960-1975 (1st ed.). Memphis: Sharngri-La Projects. ISBN 0-9668575-1-8.
