= The Banshees =

American garage rock band

The Banshees

The Banshees were an American garage rock band formed in Chicago, Illinois, in 1966. The group is best remembered for its sole single, featuring the dissonant proto-punk anthem, "Project Blue". The song has become a classic of the musical genre of garage rock and is featured prominently on several compilation albums.

The group's origins trace back to the Fugitives, which were configured in 1962. By 1965, after some personnel changes, the band was known as the Prophets, and had begun recording promos for Columbia Records, along with demos of "Project Blue" and its eventual B-side "Free". The line-up consisted of Frank Bucaro (lead vocals, harmonica), Ron Rouse (lead guitar), Rick Notolini (bass guitar), Tom Leetzow (drums), and John Smead (rhythm guitar), with Bucaro and Rouse being the leaders of the Prophets.

Record producer Bill Traut just happened to be listening to the group recording their demo of "Project Blue" and immediately signed the band to a recording contract. Traut renamed the Prophets to the Banshees, and replaced the inexperienced Notolini with local Chicago musician, Peter Sheldon. The resulting officially-released version of "Project Blue" is a surprisingly raw and cathartic exercise in primal blues-based proto-punk, featuring a distorted three-note guitar riff its center, that is repeated relentlessly throughout the song and set to a pounding beat, punctuated by agonizing yelps and screams supplied by vocalist Bucaro. The lesser-known flip-side "Free" was a soothing ballad, which stands in marked contrast to the relative "shock therapy" of its A-side predecessor.

"Project Blue" was released in June 1966 on Dunwich Records. Although both Rouse and Bucaro co-wrote its two sides, only Rouse's name is featured on the single because he was the only one who was 21 years-old. The song became a popular fixture in the Banshees' live repertoire as they regularly performed in Illinois venues the New Place, the Alamo, and the Cellar, among others. It was the only surviving recording by the group as they disbanded in early 1967. Since its initial release, "Project Blue" has been recognized as a garage rock classic. Among the compilation albums it has been featured on, include Oh Yeah! The Best of Dunwich Records, Pebbles, Volume 9, and Mindrocker, Volume 2. However, "Free" has yet to be reissued on any album. According to the liner notes of Oh Yeah!, Bucaro, who supplied the "lead scream" to "Project Blue", later became a Catholic priest.

== Members ==
- Frank Bucaro - lead vocals, harmonica
- Ron Rouse - lead guitar
- Rick Notolini - bass guitar
- Tom Leetzow - drums
- John Smead - rhythm guitar
- Peter Sheldon - bass guitar

== Discography ==
- "Project Blue" b/w "Free" - Dunwich Records (D-129), 1966
