= The Echoes of Carnaby Street =

American garage rock band from Florida (1965–1967)

- Origin: Miami, Florida, United States
- Genres: Chicano rock; garage rock
- Years active: 1965–1967
- Label: Thames
- Past members: Mark Resnick; Russell Frehling; Jeff Laibson; Sammy Weiselberg; Eddie Marcus

The Echoes of Carnaby Street were an American garage rock band from Miami, Florida who were active in the 1960s. They became a popular live act in the Miami area and enjoyed a minor regional hit with "No Place Or Time", released on Thames Records. In the intervening years their work has come to the attention of garage rock enthusiasts, particularly with the inclusion of "No Place No Time" on the 1986 Louisiana Punk Groups From The 60's Vol. 1 compilation, which paradoxically resulted in helping contribute to the misconception that they were a Louisiana band.

The Echoes of Carnaby Street began as the Tidal Waves in Miami Florida in 1965 and were founded by students from Nautilus Junior High. The group's lineup eventually settled down to Mark Resnick and Russell Frehling on guitars, Jeff Laibson on keyboards, Sammy Weiselberg on bass, and Eddie Marcus on drums. Guitarist Resnick’s father was the managing director of the Monte Carlo and Shelborne hotels, which guaranteed the group regular and steady booking. The band nonetheless became respected for their performing abilities and eventually became fixtures all around the Florida Bandstand circuit. They quickly matriculated beyond just appearing at smaller venues such the Surfside Community Center and the 163rd Street Mall, eventually landed dates at the Dinner Key Auditorium. Reflecting the influence of the British Invasion they eventually changed their name to Echoes of Carnaby Street, after the popular street that in the 1960s was the mecca of mod fashion in London.

Steve Palmer of the Florida Bandstand heard them and was impressed enough to arrange for the group to record at Criteria Studios for his Thames label, under the guidance of producer and former Canadian Legends drummer, and Jim Sessody. The group laid down two tracks, "No Place or Time" and "Baby Doesn't Know", both of which were written or co-written by Travis Fairchild of another Miami band the Clefs of Lavender Hill, who had scored a hit that year (initially on Thames Records) with "Stop! Get A Ticket". "No Place or Time had a melody but no lyrics, so Mark Resnick contributed words to the song, which was chosen to be the A-side of the group's single, which was released in August of 1966. "No Place Or Time" was immediately picked up by WFUN Radio, and made #52 on the "Boss 79" survey in September 1966. Despite their favorable prospects, the group did not hold together and broke up shortly thereafter.

Mark Resnick later emerged in the Miami-to-New York glam band Wowii, who gained a cult following, and their successor, Broken Heroes. Keyboardist Jeff Laibson went on to pursue a career as a multimedia artist, mixing music and visual art. Russell Frehling went on to achieved success in avant-garde music.

In the intervening years the Echoes of Carnaby's work has attracted the attention of garage rock enthusiasts and collectors. "No Place No Time" was included on the 1986 Louisiana Punk Groups From The 60's Vol. 1 compilation, put out by Eva Records, then again later on CD on Eva's 1991 Sixties Archives Vol. 3 Louisiana Punk. While bringing the band's work to a wider audience, Eva Records, by including the group on Louisiana compilations, inadvertently contributed to the misconception that the Echoes of Carnaby were a Louisiana band, a point which former band members have dispelled.

== Membership ==
- Mark Resnick (guitar)
- Russell Frehling (guitar)
- Jeff Laibson (keyboards)
- Sammy Weiselberg (bass)
- Eddie Marcus (drums)

== Discography ==
- "No Place or Time" b/w "Baby Doesn't Know" (Thames 105, August 1966)

== Bibliography ==
- Markesich, Mike (2012). Teenbeat Mayhem (1st ed.). Branford, Connecticut: Priceless Info Press. ISBN 978-0-985-64825-1.
- Lemlich, Jeffrey M. (1992). Savage Lost: Florida Garage Bands of the 60s and Beyond (First ed.). Plantation, FL: Distinctive Publishing Corporation. ISBN 0-942963-12-1.
