= Euphoria's Id =

American garage rock band

Background information
- Also known as: The Id
- Origin: Saco, Maine, United States
- Genre: Garage rock
- Years active: 1963–1966
- Label: Eadit
- Past members: Jay Snyder; Skip Smith; David Wakefield; Jimmy Drown; Terry Drown

Euphoria's Id was an American garage rock band formed in Saco, Maine, in 1963. Remembered as a popular live attraction in the New England teen scene, the group released two singles in their recording career, including the band's highly regarded cover version of "Hey Joe". A heavily favored inclusion on the New England Teen Scene compilation album series, a retrospective album was released in response to Euphoria's Id's reinterest.

== History ==
The band was originally active under the name the Electrons with a line-up that briefly existed in 1963. Founding member Jay Snyder (keyboards) and David Wakefield (alto saxophone, harmonica) were the only pieces of the first incarnation of the group to remain when personnel changes took place late in 1963. The line-up, which would eventually record and remain for the duration of the group's existence, included Jimmy Drown (lead guitar, vocals), Skip Smith (drums), and Jimmy's cousin Terry Drown (bass guitar, vocals). Briefly performing as the Nomads, the band became known as the Id in late-1964. As the Id became a well-attended attraction, the group received a role as house band at the teen dance club Trudeau's and hosted a series of dances called the Cherry a-Go-Go. Among the musical acts the Id opened for were Herman's Hermits, Chubby Checker, and the Strangeloves.

According to Snyder in an interview with music historian Mike Dugo, the group's sound "was all about Jimmy’s single-coil, chunky-sounding Fender Strat. He was both a lead and rhythm player with deep roots into rock guitar traditions". He also mentions "an organ that was usually droning. That came about because of a harmonium drone part I heard and loved on Rubber Soul ('The Word')". In 1965, the Id entered Triple A Studios in Dorchester, Massachusetts to record their debut single, which included a cover version of "Morning Dew" and the proto-punk original "I Just Don't Understand You Baby". Although the release was regionally successful, it was Snyder's composition "Deception's Ice" and a cover version of "Hey Joe" which the band became best-remembered for. Per Jimmy Drown's suggestion, the Id's rendition featured a Byrds-inspired raga guitar line, with lyrics on par with the Shadows of Knight's take on the tune.

Released under the name Euphoria's Id on Eadit Records in 1966, "Deception's Ice" in more recent times is catalogued at number 221 on the G45 Central website's 1,000 rarest garage records. The group's rendition has swelled in popularity, especially among garage rock revivalists, as it appears on compilation albums such as Pebbles, Volume 22, New England Teen Scene, and I'm Losing Tonight! Volume 6. The website describes the cover as a "standout in a pack of heavyweight 'Hey Joe' contenders". In September 1966, Euphoria's Id was forced to disband after Jimmy and Terry Drown were drafted to fight in the Vietnam War. Although the group considered reforming upon their return, Terry Drown was killed in combat a year later.

Snyder and Smith continued working together, jamming at University of Maine in the group Fate. The band recorded a test-pressing of Sgt. Death, a protest album focusing predominantly on the Vietnam War. Intended to be issued in 1968, the album was eventually scrapped, but released 30 years later on Rockadelic Records. After the death of Jim Drown in 2003, Snyder was encouraged to release an album which configured all of Euphoria's Id's recorded material. Issued on his own record label, Mastering the Art of French Kissing features the band's released songs as well as previously unreleased early rehearsal tapes. Among the tracks is "Don't Count on Me", an original tune that bears a strong resemblance to the Standells' "Dirty Water". Euphoria's Id's song was recorded and performed live two years prior to the Standells releasing their hit song.
