= The Rising Tydes =

American garage rock band

Background information
- Origin: Philadelphia, Pennsylvania, United States
- Genres: Garage rock
- Years active: 1965–1968
- Labels: Sound Plus
- Past members: Ed Murray; Mike Frederick; Dave Snyder; Ray Rudnitskas; Mike Bell; Bob Derer; Bill Byer

The Rising Tydes were an American garage rock band formed in Philadelphia, Pennsylvania, in 1965. Hyped to be a breakout national success, the Rising Tydes appeared in numerous television programs and performed extensively throughout the city. Although such widespread success eluded the group, they are still remembered for their rebellious live appearances and a single, "Artificial Peace" b/w "Don't Want You Around," which was released in 1967. Both songs have since been re-released on the garage rock compilation album, Crude Pennsylvania, Volume 2.

== History ==
Formed in 1965, the group was assembled loosely after Ed Murray (vocals) and Mike Frederick (vocals) began performing together at the recreational center in Morrel Park. They were joined by Dave Snyder (drums), Ray Rudnitskas (lead guitar) and Mike Bell (rhythm guitar), and became known as the Rising Tydes, a name inspired by the Rolling Stones' compilation album Big Hits (High Tide and Green Grass). Performing at parties, high schools, and parades, the band was notorious for their pounding cover versions of Rolling Stones and Kinks compositions, as well as destructive conclusions that resulted in the band members smashing their instruments. In addition, the Rising Tydes were common fixtures at battle of the band contests, competing regularly against rival acts the Flocks and the Glass Company.

In 1966, Ronnie Spering, Frederick's cousin, replaced Snyder on drums, and keyboardist Bob Derer was enlisted to round out the band's sound. Frederick briefly was dropped from the Rising Tydes, but returned after learning bass guitar, and earning the role from potential competitors. When asked how popular the band became in an interview, Frederick recollected "We were pretty well known and very popular in some circle. I remember one night played at a school in Sharon Hill for a WFIL dance and the place went nuts. You'd have though we were the Beatles. They just loved us. At least the girls did. The boys weren't quite so keen about their girlfriends screaming over the dudes on stage". He also contributes the band's popularity to their manager Tony Lazarus, who successful marketed the Rising Tydes to local deejays and concerts outside Philadelphia in Reading and New Jersey.

Early in 1967, the group secured a recording contract with Sound Plus Records, and recorded two original tunes: "Artificial Peace" and "Don't Want You Around". Released later in the year, the Rising Tydes promoted the single on television programs such as deejay Jerry Blavit's radio show, and Summertime on the Pier, hosted by Ed Hurst featuring Brenda Lee and Buddy Rich. Derer left the group and was replaced by Bill Byer, just prior to headlining the first city-sponsored rock concert in Philadelphia. However, Frederick, in order to avoid being conscripted into the Army, joined the United States Air Force in 1968. The group eventually disbanded later in the year. In 1996, both songs released by the band were re-released on the compilation album Crude Pennsylvania, Volume 2.

== Discography ==
- "Artificial Peace" b/w "Don't Want You Around" - Sound Plus (LO 7-3194), 1967
