= The Enfields =

American garage rock band

- The Enfields, (1966).

Background information
- Origin: Wilmington, Delaware, United States
- Genres: Beat, garage rock, psychedelic rock, psychedelic music, surf rock, folk rock, freakbeat
- Years active: 1964–1967
- Label: Richie
- Past members: Ted Munda; Charlie Berl; John Bernard; Bill Gallery; Gordon Berl; John Rhoads

The Enfields were an American garage rock and psychedelic band from Wilmington, Delaware who were active in the 1960s. They were led by guitarist and songwriter Ted Munda, and their style was highly influenced by the British Invasion and folk rock. They were considered the top group in Wilmington at the time and enjoyed several local hits, though they failed to reach a wider national audience due to poor management. The Enfields broke up in 1967, but Munda went on to form the group the Friends of the Family. Ted was also in the Blues Magoos, wrote for various Publishing companies in LA, was signed to Columbia Records in 1973 with group" Hotspur", and co-wrote "Blame It On Love" for Smokey Robinson in 1983–84 on Motown. He has several albums of unreleased produced material.

== History ==
The Enfields were formed in 1964 as merger between two Wilmington, Delaware bands called the Playboys and the Touchstones. Ted Munda and Gordon Berl were members in the Playboys, and John Bernard, Bill Gallery, Robin Eaton, and Charles Jenner played in the Touchstones, a surf rock band. Once the two bands merged, their lineup and roles were as follows: Charlie Berl on vocals, Ted Munda, Vocals and Guitar and John Bernard on lead guitar, Bill Gallery on bass, and Gordon Berl on drums, often with Ted Munda and Charlie Berl on harmonies. Mac Morgan and Robin Eaton were never members of the Enfields. They needed a name for the band and wanted to find something decidedly English, in keeping with the popular British Invasion currently in vogue, so they chose the name the Enfields in honor of the famous British rifle named after the London Borough of Enfield.

In 1966 they cut three singles released on the Richie label, beginning with their first "In the Eyes of the World," which became a big local hit, and was followed up with an even bigger hit with the folk rock-influenced "She Already has Somebody" b/w "I'm For Things You Do," both penned by Munda By this time, the Enfields had become the most popular group in Wilmington, however their local success failed to translate into wider national recognition. Their next single featured a ballad on the A-side, "You Don't Have Very Far," b/w the harder and more compulsive "Face to Face." In 1966, Bill Gallery left the band to go to college, and John Rhoads, from the Wrecking Crew, joined on bass. In early 1967 they released their last single "Twelve Month Coming" b/w the fiery rocker "Time Card," but the single failed to chart. When Charlie Berl was drafted the group broke up.

Following the group's breakup, guitarist Ted Munda formed the Friends of the Family with John Rhoads and two musicians, Wayne Watson and Jimmy Crawford, who had played in another local outfit the Turfs. The new band had a jazzier and more progressive approach. They went into Philadelphia's Virtue Recording Studios to record six demos, which came to the attention of Kama Sutra Records, but did not result in a contract. On July 24, 1968, the Friends of the Family shared the bill with The Who, The Troggs, and Pink Floyd at JFK Stadium, but due to inclement weather the show had to be halted. The line up changed and John Rhoads was replaced by Ray Andrews and Keyboards by Lindsay Lee. This is the lineup that played all the live shows and recorded 7 songs that are lost to history.

In the intervening years since their demise, the Enfields' work has come to the attention of garage rock collectors and enthusiasts and has appeared on several compilations such as Classic Sounds of the 60s assembled by Get Hip Records. The Enfields' complete recordings have been anthologized on The Enfields/and early Friends of the Family, put out by Distortions Records.

== Members ==
- Ted Munda (guitar, vocals, songwriter)
- Charles Berl (vocals)
- John Bernard (guitar)
- Bill Gallery (bass, to 1966)
- Gordon Berl (drums)
- John Rhoads (bass, 1966–67)

(Updated by Ted Munda 4/15/2017)

== Discography ==
- "In the Eyes of the World" b/w "In the Eyes of the World" (Richie 669, February 1966)
- "She Already Has Somebody" b/w "I'm For Things You Do" (Richie 670, May 1966)
- "You Don't Have to Go Far" b/w "Face to Face" (Richie 671, October 1966)
- "Twelve Months Coming" b/w "Time Card" (Richie 675, 1967)
