= The Redcoats (American band) =

American garage rock band

Background information
- Also known as: The Statesiders; The Sidekicks
- Origin: Wildwood, New Jersey, United States
- Genres: Garage rock; pop rock
- Years active: 1964–1967
- Labels: Laurie, Providence, RCA Victor
- Past members: John Spirt; Mike Burke; Randy Bocelle; Zack Bocelle

The Redcoats were an American garage rock band formed in Wildwood, New Jersey, in 1964. Heavily influenced by the Beatles from the onset, the group released one single as the Redcoats before recording as the Sidekicks. As the Sidekicks, the band earned a national hit with their tune, "Suspicions", and recorded an album in 1966. In 2001 an album of newly discovered recordings, Meet the Redcoats! Finally, was issued.

== History ==
Co-founder John Spirt (drums) possessed prior recording experience and national success as a credited writer and singer on the Ran-Dells' Top 20 novelty hit "Martian Hop", in 1963. With the arrival of the Beatles and the onset of the British Invasion, Spirt formed a Beatlesque band, which complimented his composing style. Spirt recruited Zach Bocelle (lead vocals, rhythm guitar), Randy Bocelle (bass guitar), and Mike Burke (lead guitar, vocals) as bandmates, and hired record producer Steven Rappaport – the cousin of Spirt and producer of "Martian Hop" – as the band's manager. When asked if the band had any other influences in an interview, Rappaport limited them just to the Fab Four, before saying: "it's obvious from listening that their influences were generally Merseybeat – not just the Beatles". After extensive rehearsals at Spirt's home garage, the group signed to Laurie Records in 1965.

Before recording as the Redcoats, the group released a single, "She Belonged to Another", as the Statesiders on Laurie's subsidiary Providence Records imprint, according to the BMI database. Credited to Carnaby and Shakespeare, pseudonyms for Spirt and Burke, music historian Chris Bishop hypothesizes the single was recorded without the Bocelle brothers' participation, which explains the release's absence from Zach Bocelle's history of the Redcoats. In 1986, "She Belonged to Another" was featured on Mindrocker, Volume 12. The band, under the name the Redcoats, entered the studios again in the latter half of 1965, recording two Merseybeat-influenced tunes: "Love Unreturned" and "The Dum-Dum Song", both highlighted by English-sounding vocal harmonies. Receiving local radio play in New Jersey, the Redcoats garnered a following in the region with the songs, which were issued on their second single. More recording sessions followed; however, Rappaport could not manage to have the new material released on Providence Records.

Rappaport departed for Europe in 1966, leaving the group to arrange a contractual agreement with a wealthy investor from Philadelphia. With the band signed to RCA Records and their name changed to the Sidekicks, Spirt's composition "Suspicions" was chosen to be recorded with full orchestrated arrangements. It became a moderate national hit, reaching number 55 on the Billboard Hot 100. As a result of their success, the Sidekicks recorded an album titled Fifi the Flea, which mixed a combination of Spirt originals and pop tunes. However, the group's new manager exploited the band members of most of their royalties, forcing a disillusioned Spirt to disband the Sidekicks by early-1967.

Years after the group broke up, Rappaport discovered the master tapes to the band's recording sessions as the Redcoats. Although the sound quality was poor in its original state, Rappaport digitally remastered the tapes and presented them to Dionysus Records, which agreed to distribute a total of twelve songs (ten previously unreleased). On April 17, 2001, the material appeared on Meet the Redcoats! Finally, a rare feat for a 1960s garage band to have unreleased songs issued after such an amount of time. Eight additional compositions were also recorded around the same time period as those presented on the album; however, Rappaport reported the tapes as being "lost forever". Commenting on Meet the Redcoats! Finally, music historian Richie Unterberger was critical of the lack of originality, but also wrote the album is "quite a refreshing contrast to the cruder, less-melodic, and less-musically accomplished sounds that are far more the norm for super-obscure '60s garage reissues".
