= Christopher and the Souls =

American garage rock band

- Also known as: The Souls
- Origin: McAllen, Texas, United States
- Genres: Garage rock
- Years active: 1964–1967
- Labels: Pharaoh
- Past members: Jay Hausmann; David Smith; Brian Voss; Dee Edwards; Allen Kirsh; David Lott; Jerry Ebensberger; Murray Schlesinger; Christopher Voss

Christopher and the Souls were an American garage rock band formed in McAllen, Texas, in 1964. Recording a song inspired by the poetic writing of Christopher Voss called "Diamonds, Rats, and Gum", Christopher and the Souls became one of the highlights of the Texas garage scene. Although the group disbanded in 1967, their song has been rediscovered and highly valued among collectors. Noted for its rarity on the already isolated Pharaoh record label, only a few copies of "Diamonds, Rats, and Gum" are known to exist; however, it is accessible on compilation albums.

== History ==
Late in 1964, McAllen High School students Jay Hausmann (guitar) and David Smith (lead guitar) began a collaborative effort, teaching each other different guitar riffs and exploring the music brought to the United States from the British Invasion. Feeling confident with his newly possessed skills, Hausmann recruited Smith along with Allen Kirsh (lead vocals), Brian Voss (bass guitar, vocals), and Dee Edwards (drums) to form a band. After several months of extensive rehearsal in 1965, the group began to perform, christening themselves as the Souls. Although no one recalls why the band choose that moniker, future member David Lott speculates it as a take-off of the Beatles' album Rubber Soul. The first line-up of the Souls lasted about six months until Voss exited to address personal issues, and Edwards departed for college. Briefly stalling the band's live appearances, the Souls re-equipped their personnel by adding drummer Lott and bass player Jerry Ebensberger, both members of local group the Madhatters.

With the revamped line-up, the Souls began gigging frequently at church dances, private parties, and popular teen spots such as the Hide-A-Way Club in Harlingen and the National Guard Armory in McAllen. Lott explained the buergoning garage band scene the band was involved in context of a hierarchy, with "the top end of the spectrum were The Playboys of Edinburg, who recorded several quality tunes, and a great little group who never recorded called The Invaders. Then the next level would've been The Headstones and The Cavaliers—guys in their late teens or early twenties. And then the next age group down would've been The Souls, and a band called The Marauders. All were ages 14, 15 and 16 years old". When the Souls' founder, Hausmann had to move to Nashville in 1966, he was replaced by former Maruaders member Murray Schlesinger.

Around the same time frame, the group was introduced to Christopher Voss, the brother of Brian Voss. Inspired to commit his poetic writing to vinyl, Voss presented Smith with acoustic sets of his song-poems, "Diamonds, Rats, and Gum" and "Broken Hearted Lady". Exemplifying the feelings of teenage-angst, the Souls had no past intentions to record; however, Voss insisted he would volunteer funds for recording sessions at the now legendary Jimmy Nicholls' Pharaoh Studios. In September 1966, the band entered the studio—equipped with a basic two-track—recording virtually live with Voss as the lead vocalist. Short on time, "Diamonds, Rats, and Gum" was completed in one take, but the band still intended it to be the song they promoted. However, disc jockey Rusty Bell choose to play the B-side, "Broken Hearted Lady", which managed to reached number 23 regionally.

In total, 500 copies of the "Diamonds, Rats, and Gum" single were pressed (credited to Christopher and the Souls) in a custom limited release, becoming the "rarest of the rare on a very rare label". According to music critic Andrew Brown, the composition "is one of the most savage parodies of Top 40 idealism ever made", commending the song for its "fiercely demented fuzz guitar, bass and drums". Voss only performed once with the group before leaving for college and eventually becoming a pastor. Regardless, the band received effective promotion from Bell, who arranged the band to share billings with popular Texas acts the Zakary Thaks and the Five Americans. Early in 1967, Hausmann returned to McAllen, rejoining Christopher and the Souls. His return, however, wasn't enough to solidify the band as they struggled for a consistent musical direction during the Summer of Love. After one last gig opening for the Five Americans, the group disbanded.

"Diamonds, Rats, and Gum" was rediscovered in the sphere of the garage revival, appearing first on the compilation album Texas Punk, Volume 5, in 1985. In September 2008, a copy of the band's single sold on eBay for $1,225, prompting interest in the identity of the group who recorded it. Texas Monthly featured Christopher and the Souls in an article the following year, and invited the group to reunite at a South by Southwest® (SXSW®) Music Festival showcase in 2010 in Austin, Texas. Another reunion concert also took place in 2010 and as of 2022 the band continues to appear occasionally at public and private events in Austin.

== Membership ==
=== As the Souls (1964–1965) ===
- Jay Hausmann (vocals, guitar)
- David Smith (lead guitar)
- Allen Kirsh (lead vocals)
- Brian Voss (bass guitar, vocals)
- Dee Edwards (drums)

=== As the Souls (1965–1966) ===
- Jay Hausmann (vocals, guitar)
- David Smith (lead guitar)
- Allen Kirsh (lead vocals)
- Murray Schlesinger (rhythm & lead guitar)
- Jerry Ebensberger (bass)
- David Lott (drums)

=== As Christopher and the Souls/the Souls (1966–1967) ===
- Christopher Voss (lead vocals on "Diamonds, Rats, and Gum" and "Broken Hearted Lady")
- David Smith (lead guitar)
- Allen Kirsh (lead vocals; tambourine on recording of Diamonds, Rats, and Gum)
- Murray Schlesinger (rhythm & lead guitar)
- Jerry Ebensberger (bass)
- David Lott (drums)
- Jay Hausmann (guitar, returned in 1967 after the release of single)

== Discography ==
- "Diamonds, Rats, and Gum" b/w "Broken Hearted Lady" – Pharaoh (P-151), 1966
