= The Bare Facts =

American garage rock band

Background information
- Origin: Portsmouth, Ohio, United States
- Genres: Garage rock; blue-eyed soul
- Years active: 1966–1967
- Labels: Jubilee
- Past members: Bill Williams; Dave Craycraft; Rusty Pruitt; Ron Priutt; Randy Boldman; Bill Maple

The Bare Facts were an American garage rock band formed in Portsmouth, Ohio, United States, in 1966. Immensely popular in Ohio, the group earned a regional hit with their catchy blue-eyed soul-influenced tune "Georgiana", and the equally popular B-side "Bad Part of Town". The single the songs were featured on briefly entered the Billboard Hot 100. Though the Bare Facts could not replicate their success, the band's recordings have appeared on several compilation albums, preserving interest in the group's music.

== History ==
Bill Williams (lead guitar, lead vocals) formed the group, which consisted of members Dave Craycraft (organ, trumpet, vocals), Rusty Pruitt (drums, vocals), Ron Pruitt, (rhythm guitar), and Randy Boldman (bass guitar). The band's sound is described as blue-eyed soul, combining elements of blues musicians Otis Redding and Muddy Waters' compositions, with influences provided by British Invasion groups the Beatles and the Kinks. Taking advantage of their initial opportunities, the Bare Facts performed in multiple teen dance clubs, bars, and concerts, creating a surge in the group's popularity in Ohio, and gave rationale to concert arrangers to feature the band as the opening act for nationally relevant musical artists such as the Strangeloves, the Dave Clark Five, and the Left Banke. Portsmouth deejay Daniel Craig, according to GO Magazine and Pruitt's account, "discovered the group when they were entertaining at a record hop to raise money for an underprivileged children's home". Partnered with fellow deejay Bill Callahan, Craig was a key player to negotiating the Bare Facts' recording contract with Jubilee Records.

The band entered Jubilee Recording Studios in New York City to cut Williams' two original compositions "Georgiana" and "Bad Part of Town" (no relation to the Seeds song of the same name). During their stay in the city, the group also had a stint at the nightclub called Town and Country. In October 1966, "Georgiana", with "Bad Part of Town" on the flip-side, was released as the Bare Facts' debut single, propelling to number one on the regional charts, and scraping the number 100 position on the Billboard Hot 100. Commenting on the band's success, GO magazine exclaimed that "It’s not often that a new group generates tremendous excitement in the record industry even before their first disc hit". Indeed, the songs' combination of blue-eyed soul and jangling pop generated numerous television appearances for the Bare Facts, including on the Cleveland show Upbeat. In addition, the band was arguably the most happening musical act in Ohio, performing to sold-out concerts on a regular basis.

In early 1967, the group recruited Bill Maple to be an additional guitarist and trumpeter. They returned to New York City to record "The Only Thing" and "To Think"—two originals by Craycraft—for their second single. However, the record was supported by considerably less advertisement as Jubilee distributed the release on their subsidiary label, BT Records, after conflicts with the Bare Facts' managers spurred their interest. It was later revealed that Craig was falsifying the band's earning from their singles and gigs, immediately resulting in his firing. The band briefly relocated to Florida in the summer of 1967, but without a sense of leadership to guide the young musicians, they disbanded in August 1967.

Over the years, the group's material has appeared on compilation albums. The song "Bad Part of Town" has received the most exposure, it is found on Mayhem and Psychosis, Volume 2, Sixties Archives, Volume 5 (as does "Georgiana"), and Psychedelic Microdots, Volume 3: My Rainbow Life. Additionally, "To Think" is included on Psychedelic States: Ohio in the 1960s, Volume 2. In April 2009, Sundazed Music compiled the band's material from their two singles on The Bare Facts EP.

== Members ==
- Bill Williams - Lead guitar, lead vocals
- Dave Craycraft - Organ, trumpet, vocals
- Rusty Pruitt - Drums, vocals
- Ron Pruitt - Rhythm guitar
- Randy Boldman - Bass guitar
- Bill Maple - Trumpet, guitar

== Discography ==
- "Georgiana" b/w "Bad Part of Town" (Jubilee, 1966)
- "The Only Thing" b/w "To Think" (Josie, 1967)
