= The Nomads (Texas band) =

American band

- Origin: Texas City, Texas, United States
- Genres: Garage rock; folk rock; psychedelic rock
- Years active: 1960s
- Labels: Damon, Orbit
- Past members: Frank Zigel; Doug Kirby; Brian Collins; Fred Thomas; Shawn Bennett

The Nomads were an American garage rock/psychedelic rock band from Texas City, Texas near Galveston who were active in the 1960s. The band was known for Brian Collins' passionate vocals and a melodic guitar sound. They are not to confused with a number of other bands using the same name in Texas and elsewhere, such as the Nomads from Fort Worth and the Nomads from Mount Airy, North Carolina.

The band's membership consisted of Brian Collins and Frank Zigal (or Zigal) on lead vocals, Doug (or Bill) Kirby on keyboards, Brian Collins on guitar, Fred Thomas on bass, and Shawn Bennett on drums. Collins was a charismatic singer who was ably to convey both sincerity and vulnerability in his vocals. The band was also known for a melodic guitar sound, as evidenced in songs such as "I'll Be There, (written by Collins who later would record for ABC and RCA records and be nominated for a Grammy Award for his work on the "Urban Cowboy" soundtrack). They band was also capable of harder rocking material such as their protopunk version of Burt Bacharach and Hal David's "My Little Red Book," previously performed by Love, which features an aggressive organ part.

In 1967, the group recorded the single "I Walk Alone" b/w "I'll Be There," which as released in August on Damon Records. In early 1968, they cut a single for the Orbit label, "Situations" b/w "Three o'clock Merrian Webster Time." The group later evolved into the Smoke, but are not to be confused with the freakbeat group from England or another group of the same name from Australia.

The band's work has been featured on various compilations such as Three o'clock Merrian Webster Time put out by Cicadelic Records and Acid Visions Volume 8: Another Time, Another Place, issued by Spalax Records in 2002.

== Membership ==
- Frank Zigal (lead vocals)
- Doug Kirby (keyboards)
- Brian Collins (lead vocals and guitar)
- Fred Thomas (bass)
- Shawn Bennett (drums)

== Discography ==
- "I Walk Alone" b/w "I'll Be There," (Damon 101, August 1967)
- "Situations" b/w "Three o'clock Merrian Webster Time" (Orbit 1121, January 1968)
