= Ed Wool and the Nomads =

American rock band

- Also known as: The Sure Cure, the Pineapple Heard, and Wool
- Origin: Watertown, New York, United States
- Genres: Garage rock, Psychedelic rock, Blues rock
- Years active: Mid-60s-early 70s
- Labels: Cameo-Parkway, RCA, Diamond, Epic, ABC, Columbia
- Past members: Ed Wool; Phil Udaskin; Al Grant; Mike Christie; Chuck Martuzes

Ed Wool and The Nomads were an American rock band from Watertown, New York led by Ed Wool, who were active in the 1960s and early 1970s. At the time, they were one of the most popular bands in northern upstate New York and also recorded under other names such as the Sure Cure and the Pineapple Heard, eventually becoming Wool, and recording a self-titled album under that name in 1969. They briefly reunited for two shows in 2007 and 2008.

== History ==
Ed Wool and the Nomads were formed in 1963 by Ed Wool, a graduate of the Watertown High School class of 1962. From a young age Wool was a guitar prodigy and songwriter. He became influenced by the British Invasion sound, then later by soul and R&B. The band's initial lineup consisted of Ed Wool on lead guitar and vocals, Phil Udaskin on bass, and Al Grant on drums. Shortly afterward, Chris Christie replaced Udaskin on bass. In the mid-1960s Ed Wool and The Nomads became one of the biggest bands in the northern Upstate New York region and opened for acts such as Mitch Ryder & the Detroit Wheels, the Young Rascals, and accompanied the Rolling Stones along with Patti LaBelle and the Bluebelles and Boston's the Rockin' Ramrods. According to Chris Christie:

We were still inside and backstage. My understanding is, they arrived and left, and I'm only telling you what I heard in a bread track. My thought is probably a van of some kind that came in under the War Memorial, and they came upstairs. They literally dropped their guitars and ran and they were gone. They were out of that building so fast you couldn't believe it. The poor kids out front all thought they were still there of course. Tried to rush the stage and all that. They were long gone. You have to remember that Brian Jones was still in the group as well.

In 1966, the group secured a recording contract with RCA Victor and cut the single, "I Need Somebody” b/w “Please, Please, Please." Several line-up changes ensued as the decade progressed. Bassist Christie departed and was replaced by Chuck Martuzes. Ed Wool remained the act's focal point. The group was known as the Sure Cure briefly, releasing the Feldman, Goldstein, Gottehrer-penned "I Wanna Do It" for the Cameo-Parkway label." In 1967, as the Pineapple Heard, they became first to record Boyce & Hart's "Valleri", for the Diamond label—a year before The Monkees had a hit with it. At the end of the decade, the band changed its name to Wool, and recorded the 1969 self-titled album, Wool. They remained active into the early 1970s, but disbanded soon into the new decade.

In 2007 and 2008 the group reunited for a two concerts, first at Bonnie Castle in Alexandria Bay, then later the Clayton Opera House. Their work has come to the attention of garage rock collectors and enthusiasts with the reissue of the song, "I Need Somebody" on the 2001 Mind Blowers compilation.

== Membership ==
- Ed Wool (lead guitar and vocals)
- Phil Udaskin (bass)
- Al Grant (drums)
- Mike Christie (bass)
- Chuck Martuzes (bass)
- Bob Watts (Sax)
- Peter Hrabchak (Keyboards)

== Discography ==
=== Singles ===
==== Ed Wool and The Nomads ====
- "I Need Somebody" / "Please Please (Don't Go)" (1966, RCA Victor)

==== The Sure Cure ====
- "Anything You Want" / "I Wanna Do It" (1966, Cameo Parkway)

==== The Pineapple Heard ====
- "Valleri" / "Ol' Man River" Diamond; Epic)

==== Wool ====
- "Love, Love, Love, Love, Love" / "If They Left Us Alone Now" (1969, ABC)
- "Combination of the Two" / "The Boy with the Green Eyes" (1969, ABC)
- "Listen to the Sound" / "The Witch" (1970, Columbia)
- "It's Alright" / "Take Me to the Pilot" (1970, (Columbia)
- "I Got the Feeling (Oh No)" / "In the Rest of My Life" (Columbia)

=== Albums ===
==== The Nomads ====
- Audition Recordings (1964, United Artists)

==== Wool ====
- Wool (1969, ABC; 2006 CD re-issue, Delay68; 2011 digital release, Oglio Records)
