= The Bumpers =

Italian garage rock/beat band

Bumpers, The
- Origin: Rome, Italy
- Genres: Rock, Mass Beat, Garage Rock
- Years active: 1966
- Labels: Ariel, Roman Records Company, Edizioni Paoline

The Bumpers were a garage rock and beat group from Rome, Italy in the 1960s. They were one of the three bands to participate in an Italian liturgical rock mass, called The Mass of the Young in 1966.

In 1966 the Bumpers performed in a rock "beat' mass organized and composed by Marcello Giombini, La Messa Dei Giovani (The Mass of the Young), which premiered in the Borromini Chapel in Rome on April 27, in front of a large public gathering and in the presence of the mass media TV crew of the RAI network. The event, which also featured two other groups, the Angel Brains and I Barrittas, caused considerable controversy in the Catholic Church, as it was in the process of modernizing its liturgy in the wake of Vatican II. The Mass was overwhelmingly successful in attracting a young audience, but the response of the Vatican hierarchy was unexpectedly negative and swift. The band members of the Bumpers and the other groups were excommunicated, though the edict would later be rescinded. A proposed tour, which included a performance at Albert Hall, was cancelled, when all of the sponsors and venues pulled out simultaneously. The Ariel company, which had recorded the Mass went bankrupt, and the Bumpers, like the other bands were unable to get gigs even in small Italian towns. The exhibition was released on the Ariel LP, La Messa Dei Giovani (The Mass of the Young), became a cult favorite over the years, and was recently re-issued on Roman Records. In 1966, the Bumpers released several singles featuring songs excerpted from the mass, including "I believe (I believe)" b/w "Sanctus (Holy)" and "Marion" backed with the protopunk "Cupidation".

== Members ==
- Giancarlo Martucci : bass and vocals
- Sandro Gargano : organ and voice
- Piero Tinacci : lead guitar
- Amedeo Martucci : drums and vocals
- Bruno Paoloni : lead guitar

== Discography ==
=== 33 rpm ===
- 1966 : The Mass Youth ( Ariel, lnf 202; with Angel and the Brains and I Barrittas ) - later reprinted by the record company Roman Record Company, RCP 702

=== 45 rpm ===
- "I believe (I believe)" b/w "Sanctus (Holy)" (Ariel, NF 563, 1966)
- "Marion" b/w "Cupidation" (Ariel NF 570, 1966)
- Pater Noster by Mass Beat
- Hallelujah (communion) by Mass Beat
- Cupidation and Bumper to Bumper soundtrack of the movie "Target for Killing" with Stewart Granger and Curd Jurgens
- The painting of Picasso of which are authors
- The dance of the Yo Yo
- The crocodile, for Pauline Publications

== Sources cited ==
- Tiziano Tarli, Beat Italian. By Hippies in Yellow flag, editions Castelvecchi, Rome 2005 ISBN 978-88-7615-176-7 ; Chapter Masses beat, p. 144
- Fabio Marchignoli, Pop Italian-inspired Christian publisher La Pieve Poligrafica, 2008; The rumors Bumpers. p. 20, and the mass of young people, p 103
- Alessio Marino, you are blessed! 2, Beat boutique 67, 2008 (photos and information on the beat mass of 1966)
- Youth Masses, Black Skin, and Italian Beat Music. I-Italy VIETATA
