= The Opposite Six =

American garage rock band (1965–1966)

- Origin: Sacramento, California, United States
- Genres: Garage rock
- Years active: 1965-1966
- Label: Spectre
- Past members: Ed Dunk; Don Wright; Hal Hanefield; Larry McGlade; Brent MacIntosh; Jack Androvich

The Opposite Six were an American garage rock band from Sacramento, California, United States, who were active in the 1960s. They are not to be confused with another group of the same name, also from the Bay area, but from Marin County that had a more rhythm and blues orientation and comprised the basis of the later group the Sons of Champlin. This group was known for a more primal 60s punk sound, which in spite of their lack of wider success, have come to the attention of garage rock collectors and enthusiasts over the years. Their work has appeared on several compilations.

The band was initially formed as the Avengers, a surf rock outfit, by students at El Camino High School in Sacramento, California in 1965. Their membership included Ed Dunk on vocals, Don Wright and Hal Hanefield on rhythm guitar, Larry McGlade on lead guitar, Brent MacIntosh on bass, and Jack Androvich on drums. Eventually the group changed their name to "Six and the Single Girl" which was a homage to a singing diva at El Camino High whom the members fancied an association with, but later changed the name to the Opposite Six, which, itself a pun, grew out of their prior moniker.

The band went to local media personality, Bill Rase's primitive studio to record a single featuring the self-pened "I'll Be Gone," written by guitarist Don Wright which was a ragged Kinks and Rolling Stones-influenced number featuring Ed Dunk's nasal vocal and was backed with "Why Did You Lie?" The record was released on the Spectre label in January, 1966. The song became a big hit locally. After graduating from high school, the Opposite Six broke up. Don Wright later cut another version of "Why Did You Lie?" backed with "Draft Dodger Blues" on Spectre in the Fall of 1966 with former bandmates Brent MacIntosh and Jack Androvich, credited as Don Wright and the Head Set.

In the years since their breakup, the Opposite Six's work has come to the attention of garage rock collectors and has appeared on compilations. "I'm Gone" is included on Nuggets from the Golden State: The Sound Of Young Sacramento assembled by Big Beat Records and Teenage Shutdown! I'm a No-Count, put out by Crypt. "Why Did You Lie?" appears on So Cold!!! Unearthed Mid 60s Sacramento Garage distributed by Frantic Records.

== Membership ==
- Ed Dunk (vocals)
- Don Wright (rhythm guitar)
- Hal Hanefield (rhythm guitar)
- Larry McGlade (lead guitar)
- Brent MacIntosh (bass)
- Jack Androvich (drums)

== Discography ==
- "I'll Be Gone" b/w "Why Did You Lie?" (Spectre 119/120, January 1966)
