= The Troyes =

American garage rock band

- Origin: Battle Creek, Michigan, United States
- Genres: Garage rock, rock and roll, proto-punk
- Years active: 1966–1967
- Labels: Space, Phalanx

The Troyes were an American garage rock band formed in 1966, and based in Battle Creek, Michigan. They mostly played in the local teens clubs, such as Teens Inc. and Eddy's, before being the first band to be signed on Ray Anthony's label, Space Records, with "Rainbow Chaser". Despite their initial success, personal problems led the band to break up before their follow-up single "I'm Gone" could be released.

== Discography ==
- "Why?" / "Rainbow Chaser" (Phalanx 1008/1009) 1966
- "Why?" / "Rainbow Chaser" (Space 7001) 1966
- "Help Me Find Myself" / "Love Comes, Love Dies" (Space 7002) 1967
