= The Knaves =

American garage rock band

Background information
- Origin: Chicago, Illinois, United States
- Genres: Garage rock; folk rock; proto-punk
- Years active: 1964–1967
- Labels: Dunwich
- Past members: Howard Berkman; Gene Lubin; Neal Pollack; Mark Feldman; Johnno Hulbert; Stewart Einstein

The Knaves were an American garage rock band formed in Chicago, Illinois, in 1964. The band released two singles during their existence, including the song "Leave Me Alone", which is now considered a classic of the musical genre of garage rock. In addition, the group's sound was particularly unique for combining elements of folk rock and proto-punk, making the Knaves stand out among their contemporaries.

== History ==
The Knaves line-up consisted of Howard Berkman (lead guitar, vocals), Gene Lubin (drums), Neal Pollack (bass guitar), and Mark Feldman (rhythm guitar, backing vocals), and was assembled in the fall of 1964. Berkman possessed the most experience in music, previously performing in a group called the Jesters, and initially had to instruct the other band members to play their instruments, particularly Feldman, who was added more for his resemblance to a member of the Dave Clark Five. The band sustained a sizable local following in Chicago based on a repertoire of cover versions by musical artists such as the Rolling Stones, the Yardbirds, and the Kinks. It was then the Knaves attracted the interest of recording agents known as "The Thriller Brothers", who became the group's managers and, through their connections, got the band in contact with booking agent Keith Wheeler. Wheeler scheduled the band mainly in underground music venues, and clubs, particularly the Bunnylounge, whose regular patrons were associated with the American Mafia.

The band's popularity was attributed to their heavy use of the drums, combine with hard-rocking renditions of "Paint It Black", "Get Off of My Cloud", "Louie Louie", among others. In 1966, the Knaves were introduced to Terry Sachan, road manager for the Beach Boys, and who was making demos with fellow Chicago-based garage rock group, the Flock, to record tracks with the band at Boulevard Studios, for Dunwich Records. The band recorded seven songs, which resulted in one single in mid-1966. Feldman was replaced during recording sessions as a result of his inexperience by Johnno Hulbert, who also played harmonica, and take part in vocal harmonies. The resulting single included the now-classic garage rock, anti-authority anthem, "Leave Me Alone" and its B-side, "The Girl I Threw Away". "Leave Me Alone" became a top five hit in Chicago, and, while it is featured on more compilation albums than its flip-side, "The Girl I Threw Away" was particularly unique for its combination of Byrds-inspired folk rock and protopunk.

Pollack was conscripted and sent into combat in the Vietnam War later in the year. He was replaced by Stewart Einstein, however, the loss of Pollack impacted the band's image and overall sound. They recorded a second single, "Inside-Outside", but the release was nowhere near the success of the Knaves' debut. The commercial failure of the single did not impact the group regionally as the expanded their touring throughout Illinois, and they appeared on local television programming. Though the band still held a loyal following in Chicago, the group was struggling financially, and was forced to disband in early 1967. On November 6, 2001, Sundazed Music released an eight-song album on LP, called Leave Me Alone! that is composed of all the Knaves' recorded material from their two singles and previously unreleased tracks.

== Discography ==
=== Singles ===
- "Leave Me Alone" b/w " The Girl I Threw Away" – Glen Records (106), 1966
- "Leave Me Alone" b/w " The Girl I Threw Away" – Dunwich Records (45–147), 1967
- "Inside – Outside" b/w "Your Stuff" – Dunwich Records (D-164), 1967

=== EP ===
- Leave Me Alone! – Sundazed Music (SEP 10-166), 2001
