= The Better Half-Dozen =

American garage rock band

- Also known as: The Better Half
- Origin: New Orleans, Louisiana, United States
- Genres: Garage rock; pop rock
- Years active: 1966–1968
- Labels: U-DOE
- Past members: Steve Sklamba; John D'Antoni; Ted Genter; Tommy Hardtagen; Mike "Mange" Mangiapane; Ed "Eddie" McNamara; Ricky Moore; Frank Maier

The Better Half-Dozen was an American garage rock band formed in New Orleans, Louisiana, in 1966. The band played at local colleges, high schools and clubs in New Orleans and surrounding cities and states. They released one 45 single with two originals called "I'm Gonna Leave You" and "I Could Have Loved Her", which, despite insufficient promotion, has remained a classic garage rock recording.

The band originally assembled in 1965 as a group known as the Avantis, and included founding members John D’Antoni (bass guitar, backing vocals) Ted Genter (keyboards) Tommy Hardtegen (drums) Mike "Mange" Mangiapane (lead guitar, backing vocals) Ed "Eddie" McNamara (rhythm guitar, backing vocals, and Steve Sklamba (lead vocals). Practicing at their homes, the group swapped drummers when Rickey Moore, a journeyman musician who achieved regional notoriety for playing in New Orleans–based bands the Coachmen and later the Zoofs. After graduating from high school (except for Rickey who was younger than the other band members), the band and their manager Steve Montagnet decided to drop the car moniker and rename themselves the Better Half-Dozen, an allusion to the six members that comprised the band. Starting as the opening act for fellow Louisiana group the Basement Wall, the Better Half-Dozen became a popular live attraction in New Orleans and Baton Rouge, with a setlist that included mainly cover versions of the British and other Top 40 hits.

In October 1966, Montagnet, who had been promoting live shows through his organization known as Splendor Enterprises, financed the recordings of two original tunes at Cosimo Matassa's studio. The band released their debut single on the U-DOE record label, which featured the original tunes "I'm Gonna Leave You" and "I Could Have Loved Her". Despite insignificant coverage and only 500 copies being released, the songs themselves became immensely popular among the teen fanbase when the Better Half-Dozen introduced them into their live repertoire.

The explosion of the British Invasion in the mid-sixties had immense effect on garage groups, including the Better Half-Dozen. Commenting on the group's sound, Moore said in an interview "in those days, there were basically two types of white bands. There were older-style bands that used horns and brass instruments, and there were more modern-style bands, such as The Beatles. Before the group disbanded in 1968, they recorded two covers: the Yardbirds' "Mister, You're a Better Man Than I" and the West Coast Pop Art Experimental Band's "Transparent Day". These covers were never released. Both of the band's released songs are featured on Louisiana Punk Groups from the 60s, Volume 1 and Sixties Archives, Volume 3.
