= The Gaunga Dyns =

American rock band

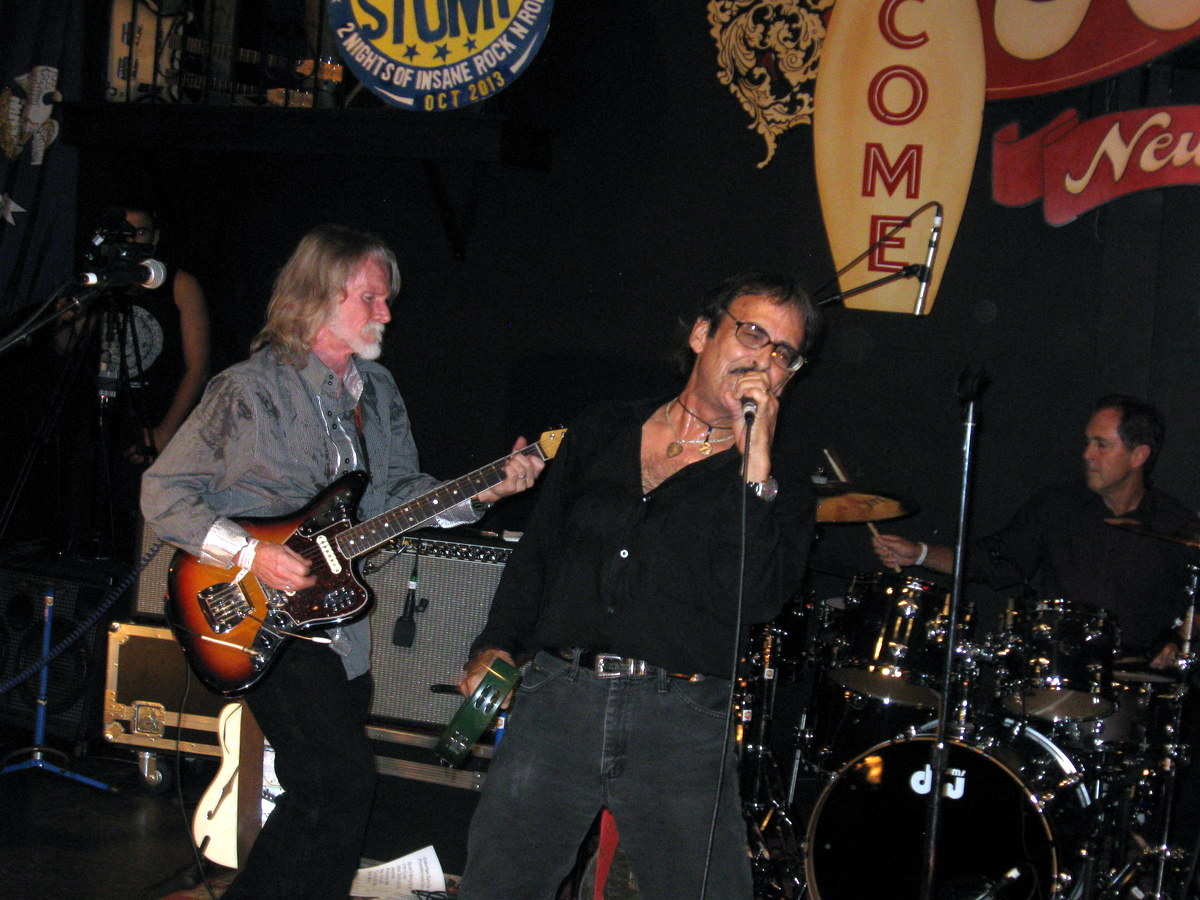
- The Gaunga Dyns in 2013

Background information
- Origin: New Orleans, Louisiana, United States
- Genres: Garage rock; rock and roll; psychedelic rock; folk rock; proto-punk
- Years active: 1965-1967
- Label: Busy-B
- Past members: Beau Bremmer; Neal Lundgren; Steve Staples; Bobby Carter; Mike King; Brian Collins; Ricky Hall; Robert Hale; Ashley Hewitt; David Paretti; Dave Carter; Johnny Baker

The Gaunga Dyns are an American rock band from New Orleans, Louisiana, who were active from 1965 through 1968 and who regrouped in 2013. In 1967, they released two singles and had a local hit with "Stick with Her". In the intervening years their work has come to the attention of garage rock enthusiasts, particularly some of their bolder songs such as "Rebecca Rodifier", which is one of the earliest rock songs to address the topic of abortion, and "No One Cares", which employs odd time signatures and changes. They reunited with most of the members from their best-known configuration for the Ponderosa Stomp festival in 2013 and have since been intermittently active with different lineups featuring guitarist Steve Staples and vocalist Beau Bremer.

== History ==
=== Origins ===
The Guanga Dyns formed in 1965 in the Algiers section of New Orleans, Louisiana, located on the West Bank of the Mississippi River, and the bulk of their membership was made up of students from Behrman High School in Algiers as well as other area schools. They and another band, the Twilights, were both from Algiers and would eventually merge to form the better known version of the band. The Twilights' membership included three members later to join the Guanga Dyns, which featured two lead singers, Beau Bremer and Neal Lundgren, as well as Steve Staples on guitar. The Guanga Dyns' original membership included Bobby Carter on bass and his brother David on guitar, as well as Johnny Baker on vocals. Their band name was created as a pun equating Rudyard Kipling's poem, "Gunga Din" with popular nightspot on Bourbon Street called the Gunga Den. In consultation with Bobby Carter, he has recounted the origins of the name to be attributed to Steve Staples Grandmother, who after being disturbed by a band practice session in the garage where the band was rehearsing by exclaiming "What is all this Gunga Din?" The Twilights had been around slightly longer than the Gaunga Dyns, but were not satisfied with their current bass player. Two of the members in the Guanga Dyns, both guitarists, after graduating from high school and did not wish to continue in the band. So, the bands merged retaining the name, the Gaunga Dyns and settled into a lineup consisting of Beau Bremer and Neal Lundgren on vocals, Steve Staples on rhythm guitar and backing vocals, Mike King on lead guitar, Bobby Carter on bass, Brian Collins on organ, and Ricky on drums.

The young age of the band did not impede them from landing gigs. In New Orleans during the sixties it was not uncommon for underage bands to play at bars. However, there were two teenage nightclubs in the New Orleans area, which did not serve alcohol and hosted shows for bands, one of which was the Hullabaloo on Airline Highway in Metairie. As they became more popular, the Gaunga Dyns sometimes played on the same bill with famous New Orleans R&B legends in the clubs. According to Steve Staples, “A couple of times, we were Ernie K-Doe's backup band. He came and did a whole set with us. That was fun. That was at the Hullabaloo Club,” says Staples. "We played with Irma Thomas and Benny Spellman at Your Father's Mustache.” "And we also played VFW halls,” he says. “We were playing all over in Mississippi and Alabama and the Gulf Coast. We didn't ever go to Texas, but we were in Louisiana, Mississippi and Alabama, mostly."

The new Gaunga Dyns worked hard, practicing daily after school and gigging on weekends. According to Steve Staples: “Every battle of the bands that we were ever in...we won...we were extremely well-rehearsed...” Their break came when Jeb Banashak, also a student at Behrman High, offered to manage the band. His father was Joe Banashak, a very successful player in New Orleans’ record business, whose A-1 Record Distributors had handled most of the Crescent City's top labels. He had formed Minit Records with popular WYLD-AM deejay Larry McKinley in 1959, which had provided hits for numerous R&B legends such as Benny Spellman, Irma Thomas, and Ernie K-Doe, and Instant Records for which Chris Kenner recorded the original version of “Land Of 1000 Dances.” Allen Toussaint served in the role of arranger and producer for many of the recordings done on these labels. Additionally, Jeb Banashak'a sister older sister was married to Tom Collins, who along with his twin brother, was a deejay at WNOE's FM station, provided the band another valuable contact.

=== Recording ===
Banashak introduced the Busy-B label in 1967 and signed the band. "Rebecca Rodifer" was group's first release and was written by Staples and lead guitarist King. It was recorded at legendary engineer, Cosimo Matassa's studio on Gov. Nichols St. in the French Quarter. Its lyrics tell a story about a fictional female character who dies in the aftermath of having an abortion. According to Staples:

Back then, abortions were illegal. Completely illegal...at the high school we went to, there were supposedly true stories about girls and people who had used coat hangers to perform abortions. And so I had heard that story, and I just extrapolated from that...I knew a girl that got pregnant in high school and had an abortion. She didn't die from it, but it was illegal. So...I thought, 'God, somebody could die from this!' ...so we recorded the record and released it. And then my mother heard it for the first time. She flipped! She went ballistic on me, but it was too late.”

“Stick With Her,” the flip side, was a cover of a song by Houston band, the Glass Kans. According to Staples, “Bobby, our bass player, knew the guy Scott who was one of the co-writers of that song,” The Gaunga Dyns recorded the songs on their next single on separate dates later that year with Cosmo Matassa. “Jeb and the engineer and Joe produced the first record,” says Staples. Beau Bremmer sang lead on all four of their Busy-B sides, with Steve Staples adding vocal harmonies. "Clouds Don't Shine" b/w "No One Cares" was their next Busy-Bee release. “The second record, he let us produce it ourselves,” says Staples, who wrote it after a painful breakup. “My girlfriend at the time, her name was Suzette,” he says. “She was going to break up with me, and she did break up with me.” King's majestic guitar was key to the track's power. “He was playing through a Vox Viscount amp and a Maestro Fuzztone, so he had the Vox on distortion and the Maestro on distortion.” “That's why you had all this overbleeding through cool distortion. It's like double distortion, is what it actually is. And he was playing a Gibson ES-330. We both had the exact same thing. Well, not the exact same guitar, but the same model. Mine was a little different than his, but he got one because he liked the one that I got.” On the flip side was "No One Cares." According to Staples, “...Mike and I went and wrote that song, and then came back in and we rehearsed it once and recorded it.” And it's killer because of what Ricky did. He just made that drum solo up. The song is a drum solo. And he made the whole thing up right on the spot. And he went on to play drums with some band—I can't remember the name of the band, but they were touring in Europe, opening for Steppenwolf in the early ‘70s. And Steppenwolf's drummer got sick, and they hired Ricky to play drums for both acts on the tour.”

=== Breakup ===
When bassist Bobby Carter moved to Connecticut, the other band members pressured Staples to play bass—a prospect that he was not enthusiastic about, but agreed to do. (Note: Concerning Carter's departure, the two sources (Dahl and Fenderstock) seem to be contradictory. Fenderstrock's account has Bobby Carter leaving due to graduation which, while the graduation may be correct, it probably was not the actual reason for his departure from the band. Whereas, the Dahl article has Steve Staples quoted directly as saying the reason Carter left was because his father was in the oil business and that the family moved to Connecticut. Carter's family had earlier lived in Houston, a major center in the oil business and had then moved to New Orleans, which was also a center in the petrochemical industry. It is likely that the requirements of Carter's father's job required another re-location.) He did not relish the new role, and it became a source of tension. The band had rehearsed the Beatles’ “Lady Madonna,” but Staples did not feel that he had yet sufficiently mastered the complex bass line. The band insisted on doing the song at the next show, despite his objections, but they played it anyway. Staples walked off the stage furiously, and did not return. According to Staples, "My anger got the best of me, and I was embarrassed...And the next day, they came to my house and kicked me out! I'd written three of the original songs that they were doing!" Without Staples, the band continued to play as the Gaunga Dyns but by the end of the school year in mid-1968 and disbanded as the members left for college.

=== Later developments and reunion ===
Since the early 1990s, Staples has operated International Vintage Guitars. The Guanga Dyns re-united for the 2013 Ponderosa Stomp (festival) held in October of that year. The organizer of the festival had been trying to convince Steve Staples to resurrect the band to play at the festival for several years. According to Staples:

“I couldn't find Beau, the lead singer. I didn't know where he was. Nobody knew where he was. None of us could find him. So we looked and looked and looked. And then about two or three years ago I was playing in the band that I play in [the Avon Suspects] at the Old Point Bar in Algiers, and Beau just walked in while I was playing. So he recognized me, and it turned out he lived about two miles from where I live...Anyway, we hit it off and we got back together. And then I started talking to Ira about Beau showing up. And I had been in touch with the organ player, and the bass player and I played in another band together 25 years ago, 30 years ago. So when Ira called me again, after I'd been talking to him about the fact that I'd run into the singer, he said, ‘Well, do you think that you could put it together this time?’ I said, ‘I'll sure give it a try!’”

Bassist Bobby Carter, and organist Brian Collins also participated in the reunion. The only band members from the classic Busy-B lineup that were not able to attend were former lead guitarist Mike King and drummer Ricky Hall, the latter due to recent back surgery. “He got a set of drums and he practiced, and he said that he just couldn't do it,” according to Staples. Robert Hale was recruited from Staples’ band, the Avon Suspects, to play drums, and Steve's wife Ashley Hewitt played rhythm guitar and sang background vocals. The Gaunga Dyns have remained active intermittently since, with different lineups featuring Staples and Bremer.

== Membership 1965-1967 ==
=== 1965-1966 ===
- Beau Bremer (vocals)
- Neal Lundgren (vocals)
- Steve Staples (rhythm guitar and backing vocals)
- Mike King (lead guitar)
- Bobby Carter (bass)
- Brian Collins (organ)
- Ricky Hall (drums)

=== 1966-1967 ===
- Beau Bremer (vocals)
- Steve Staples (rhythm guitar and backing)
- Mike King (lead guitar)
- Bobby Carter (bass)
- Brian Collins (organ)
- Ricky Hall (drums)

=== 1967 ===
- Beau Bremer (vocals)
- Mike King (guitar)
- Steve Staples (bass)
- Brian Collins (organ)
- Ricky Hall (drums)

== Discography ==
- "Rebecca Rodifier" b/w "Stick with Her" (Busy-B, 1967)
- "Clouds Don't Shine" b/w "No One Cares" (Busy-B, 1967)
