= Highs in the Mid-Sixties =

Rock album compilations

Highs in the Mid-Sixties were a series of compilation albums released in the mid 1980s on AIP Records developed by Greg Shaw. The series was spun off of the similar Pebbles series. Each volume focuses on a specific geographical region.

== Highs in the Mid-Sixties, Volume 1: LA '65 / Teenage Rebellion ==
Highs in the Mid-Sixties, Volume 1

Compilation album
- Released: 1983
- Recorded: Mid-1960s
- Genre: Garage rock, acid rock, psychedelic rock
- Label: AIP

Highs in the Mid-Sixties, Volume 1: LA '65 / Teenage Rebellion is a compilation album of American garage rock and psychedelic rock recordings from the mid to late 1960s. It was the first in a series that is nearly as long as the earlier Pebbles series of similar music (for which the Highs in the Mid-Sixties series is a companion series), although the Highs albums concentrate strictly on particular regions of the US – in this case, recordings that were released in Los Angeles, California. (Despite the subtitle, however, not all of these records were originally released in 1965).

Highs in the Mid-Sixties, Volume 2, Highs in the Mid-Sixties, Volume 3, and Highs in the Mid-Sixties, Volume 20 also showcase music from Los Angeles; while two of the later CDs in the Pebbles series, Pebbles, Volume 8 and Pebbles, Volume 9 feature bands from throughout Southern California.

This album was released in 1983 as an LP by AIP Records (as #AIP-10003).

=== Track listing ===
Side one

1. The Avengers: "Be a Cave Man" (G. Paxton, G./W. Powell), 1:53
2. The Colony: "All I Want" (Foley/Eucker), 2:28
3. Sean & the Brandywines: "She Ain't No Good" (Rowbottom), 1:59 — rel. 1965
4. The Epics: "Louie Come Home" (The Epics/Richard Berry), 2:30
5. Limey & the Yanks: "Guaranteed Love" (Reed/Paxton), 2:24
6. The Standells: "Someday You'll Cry" (Larry Tamblyn), 2:27 — rel. 1965
7. The Spats: "Tell Ya All About It, Baby" (Showalter/Johnson), 2:11 — rel. 1965
8. The Grains of Sand: "That's When Happiness Began" (Addrisi/Addrisi), 2:18

Side two

1. Gypsy Trips: "Ain't It Hard" (Roger Tillison/Terrye Tillison), 2:21
2. The Rumors: "Hold Me Now", 2:27
3. Warden & His Fugitives: "The World Ain't Changed" (Shields), 2:40
4. The Road Runners: "Goodbye" (Randy Hall), 2:25
5. The 4 Making Do: "The Simple Life" (E. G. Wells), 2:00
6. The Answer: "I'll Be In" (T. Anderson/C. Wright), 2:22
7. The Starfires: "Linda" (Freddie Fields), 1:55
8. The Lyrics: "They Can't Hurt Me" (C. Gaylord), 2:43 — rel. 1965

== Highs in the Mid-Sixties, Volume 2: LA '66 / Riot on Sunset Strip ==
Highs in the Mid-Sixties, Volume 2

Compilation album
- Released: 1983
- Recorded: Mid-1960s
- Genre: Garage rock, psychedelic rock
- Label: AIP

Highs in the Mid-Sixties, Volume 2: LA '66 / Riot on Sunset Strip features recordings that were released in Los Angeles, California. Despite the subtitle, not all of these records were originally released in 1966. The subtitle is taken from Riot on Sunset Strip (a movie that was actually released in 1967); the film features live performances by two classic garage-rock bands, the Standells (featured on Highs in the Mid-Sixties, Volume 1) and the Chocolate Watchband.

Highs in the Mid-Sixties, Volume 1, Highs in the Mid-Sixties, Volume 3, and Highs in the Mid-Sixties, Volume 20 also showcase music from Los Angeles; while two of the later CDs in the Pebbles series, Pebbles, Volume 8 and Pebbles, Volume 9 feature bands from throughout Southern California.

This album was released in 1983 as an LP by AIP Records (as #AIP-10004).

=== Notes on the tracks ===
"Let Me In", by the Second Helping, featured Kenny Loggins on vocals in his first recording effort; Loggins wrote the song, one of three compositions released by the band as singles.

=== Track listing ===
Side one

1. Terry Randall: "S.O.S."
2. People of Sunset Strip: "Sunset Symphony"
3. The Sandals: "Tell Us Dylan"
4. The Chymes: "He's Not There Anymore"
5. The Bees: "Trip to New Orleans"
6. The Roosters: "One of These Days"
7. Tangents: "Hey Joe, Where You Gonna Go?"
8. Ken & The Fourth Dimension: "Rovin' Heart"

Side two

1. W.C. Fields Memorial Electric String Band: "I'm Not Your Stepping Stone"
2. The Satans: "Lines and Squares"
3. The Dirty Shames: "I Don't Care"
4. The No-Na-Mee's: "Gotta Hold On"
5. Opus 1: "Back Seat '38 Dodge"
6. The Second Helping: "Let Me In"
7. The Grim Reepers: "Two Souls"
8. The Nite Walkers: "High Class"

== Highs in the Mid-Sixties, Volume 3: LA '67 / Mondo Hollywood ==
Highs in the Mid-Sixties, Volume 3

Compilation album
- Released: 1983
- Recorded: Mid-1960s
- Genre: Garage rock, psychedelic rock
- Label: AIP

Highs in the Mid-Sixties, Volume 3: LA '67 / Mondo Hollywood is a compilation album in the Highs in the Mid-Sixties series, featuring recordings that were released in Los Angeles. (Despite the subtitle, not all of these records were originally released in 1967. Also, not all the bands are from Los Angeles; The Search and The Lyrics were from San Diego, California).

This album was released in 1983 as an LP by AIP Records (as #AIP-10005).

=== Track listing ===
Side one

1. Giant Sunflower: "February Sunshine" (P. Vegas/V. Geary), 2:35 — rel. 1967
2. Limey and the Yanks: "Out of Sight, Out of Mind" (Duboff/Morris), 2:18 — rel. 1966
3. The Search: "Climate" (Jim Mannino/Paul Mannino), 2:28 rel. 1967
4. Research 1-6-12: "I Don't Walk there No More" (R. Bozzi/M. Yess), 2:05 rel. 1968
5. The Lyrics: "Wake up to My Voice" (C. Carl), 2:44 — rel. 1968
6. Kim Fowley: "The Canyon People" (Kim Fowley)
7. The Flower Children: "Mini-Skirt Blues" (L. Belden/S. Stoke/L. Starr), 2:05 rel. 1967
8. Somebody's Chyldren: "I'm Going Back to New York City" (David Allen), 2:00 rel. 1966

Side two

1. Hunger!: "Colors" (Mike Lane), 2:00
2. The Fantastic Zoo: "Light Show" (Eric Carle), 2:20 — rel. 1967
3. Time of Your Life: "Ode to a Bad Dream" (B. Renfro), 2:54
4. The Human Expression: "Every Night" (The Human Expression), 2:35
5. Hamilton Streetcar: "Invisible People" (P. Plummer), 3:05
6. The Grains of Sand: "Golden Apples of the Sun" (M. Lloyd/The Wailers), 2:20
7. The Painted Faces: "I Think I'm Going Mad" (O'Neil/Turano), 2:08
8. The Love Exchange: "Swallow the Sun" (John Merrill), 2:35 — rel. 1967

== Highs in the Mid-Sixties, Volume 4: Chicago ==
Highs in the Mid-Sixties, Volume 4

Compilation album
- Released: 1983
- Recorded: Mid-1960s
- Genre: Garage rock, psychedelic rock
- Label: AIP

Highs in the Mid-Sixties, Volume 4: Chicago is a compilation album in the Highs in the Mid-Sixties series, featuring recordings that were released in Chicago, Illinois.

This album was released in 1983 as an LP by AIP Records (as #AIP-10006).

=== Track listing ===
Side one

1. The Little Boy Blues: "The Great Train Robbery" (Jordan Miller), 2:38
2. The Omens: "Searching" (Revercomb/Allen), 2:24
3. The Shaprels: "Dare I Weep, Dare I Mourn" (The Shaprels), 2:45
4. The Boys: "Come with Me" (Ron Bucciarelli), 2:29
5. The Misty Blues: "I Feel No Pain" (The Misty Blues), 2:31
6. The Reasons Why: "All I Really Need Is Love" (Larry Basil), 2:29
7. Buzzsaw (aka The Lemon Drops): "Live in the Springtime" (Roger Weiss), 2:55
8. The Todds: "I Want Her Back" (Todd/Gluth), 2:30

Side two

1. Group, Inc.: "Like a Woman" (Ron Ortega), 1:58
2. The Foggy Notions: "Take Me Back and Hold Me" (Suekoff/Kaplan/Hoy/Mezique), 2:30
3. The Pattens: "Say Ma, Ma" (The Pattens), 1:50
4. The Malibus: "La Da Da" (The Malibus), 2:36
5. The Delights: "Long Green" (Lynn Easton), 2:20
6. The Untamed: "Someday Baby" (Reeves/Drews), 2:22
7. Dalek: The Blackstones: "Never Feel the Pain" (G. Bryan), 2:30
8. Warners Brothers: "Please Mr. Sullivan" (Warners Brothers/Whiteside), 2:32

== Highs in the Mid-Sixties, Volume 5: Michigan ==
Highs in the Mid-Sixties, Volume 5

Compilation album
- Released: 1983
- Recorded: Mid-1960s
- Genre: Garage rock, psychedelic rock
- Label: AIP Records

Highs in the Mid-Sixties, Volume 5: Michigan is a compilation album in the Highs in the Mid-Sixties series, featuring recordings that were released in Michigan. Highs in the Mid-Sixties, Volume 6 and Highs in the Mid-Sixties, Volume 19 are later volumes that feature bands from this state.

This album was released in 1983 as an LP by AIP Records (as #AIP-10007).

=== Track listing ===
Side 1

1. The Mussies: "12 O'Clock, July" (The Mussies), 3:45
2. The Roadrunners: "Roadrunner Baby" (Thurman), 3:25
3. The Unknown: "Shake a Tail Feather" (Hayes/Williams/Rice), 2:30
4. The Bossmen: "I'm Ready" (Bartholomew), 2:10
5. The Underdogs: "Surprise, Surprise" (Mick Jagger/Keith Richard), 2:40
6. The Run-A-Rounds: "I Couldn't Care Less" (Roy/Valente), 2:20
7. The Boss Five: "You Cheat Too Much" (Delorio), 2:20
8. The Rationals: "Turn On" (The Rationals/Carrington), 2:10

Side 2

1. The Quests: "Shadows in the Night" (R. Fritzen), 2:35
2. Peter & the Prophets: "Don't Need Your Lovin'" (Samuelson/Boylan) — rel. 1966
3. The Jammers: "You're Gonna Love Me Too" (Groendal/Snyder), 1:40
4. The Undecided?: "I Never Forgot Her" (Blackmer), 2:20
5. The Rationals: "Little Girls Cry" (Deon Jackson), 2:16
6. The Legends: "I'll Come Again" (Hamberg/Vasquez)
7. The 4 of Us: "Baby Blue" (Bob Dylan), 2:11
8. The Blues Company: "Experiment in Color" (Tim Ward), 2:00

== Volume 6 ==
Highs in the Mid-Sixties, Volume 6

Compilation album
- Released: 1984
- Recorded: Mid-1960s
- Genre: Garage rock, psychedelic rock
- Label: AIP

chronology
Highs in the Mid-Sixties, Volume 5	Highs in the Mid-Sixties, Volume 6	Highs in the Mid-Sixties, Volume 7

Highs in the Mid-Sixties, Volume 6 (subtitled Michigan, Part 2) is a compilation album in the Highs in the Mid-Sixties series, featuring recordings that were released in Michigan. Highs in the Mid-Sixties, Volume 5 and Highs in the Mid-Sixties, Volume 19 are other volumes in the series featuring bands from this state.

This album was released in 1984 as an LP by AIP Records (as #AIP-10011).

=== Notes on the tracks ===
The all-female band The Pleasure Seekers – pictured on the cover – feature Suzi Quatro (along with three of her sisters), who had later fame as both a rock musician and an actress on Happy Days.

=== Track listing ===
==== Side 1 ====
1. Yorkshires: "And You're Mine" (Bruce Alpert), 2:21
2. The Underdogs: "Friday at the Hideout" (Dave Leone), 2:10
3. Jimmy Gilbert: "Believe What I Say" (Jimmy Gilbert), 2:36
4. Jimmy Gilbert: "So Together We'll Live" (Jimmy Gilbert), 2:20
5. The 4 of Us: "Feel a Whole Lot Better" (Gene Clark), 2:11
6. The Masters of Stonehouse: "If You Treat Me Bad Again" (E. Drake), 2:33
7. Renegades V: "Wine Wine Wine" (Allday/Shine/Schwartz/Debaub/Haufler), 2:27
8. The Bossmen: "Fever of Love" (Jimmy Carver), 2:15

==== Side 2 ====
1. Blues Co.: "Love Machine" (Blues Co.), 2:50
2. The Blokes: "All American Girl" (Schwab/Hack/Dick Wagner)
3. The Underdogs: "Don't Pretend" (D. Whitehouse), 2:38
4. The Chosen Few: "It Just Don't Rhyme" (Hamilton/Nephew), 2:30
5. The Bed of Roses: "Hate" (The Bed of Roses), 2:20
6. The Chocolate Pickles: "Hey You" (J. Boyar), 2:51
7. The Pleasure Seekers: "Never Thought You'd Leave Me" (The Pleasure Seekers)
8. Blues Co.: "She's Gone" (Tim Ward), 2:50

== Volume 7 ==
Highs in the Mid-Sixties, Volume 7

Compilation album
- Released: 1984
- Recorded: Mid-1960s
- Genre: Garage rock, psychedelic rock
- Label: AIP

chronology
Highs in the Mid-Sixties, Volume 6	Highs in the Mid-Sixties, Volume 7	Highs in the Mid-Sixties, Volume 8

Highs in the Mid-Sixties, Volume 7 (subtitled The Northwest) is a compilation album in the Highs in the Mid-Sixties series, featuring recordings that were released in Washington and Oregon. Highs in the Mid-Sixties, Volume 14 and Highs in the Mid-Sixties, Volume 16 are later volumes in the series that feature bands from these states.

This album was released in 1984 as an LP by AIP Records (as #AIP-10012).

=== Notes on the tracks ===
Three different versions of Louie Louie are included here, including a cover of a follow-up song by Paul Revere & the Raiders.

=== Track listing ===
==== Side 1 ====
1. Jack Bedient & the Chessmen: "Double Whammy" (Jack Bedient)
2. Jolly Green Giants: "Busy Body" (R. L. Johnson) — rel. 1966
3. H.B. & the Checkmates: "Louise, Louise" (H. B. Ahern)
4. The Wilde Knights: "Just Like Me" (Rick Dey)
5. The Chambermen: "Louie Go Home" (Mark Lindsay/Paul Revere)
6. Jack Eely & the Courtmen: "Louie, Louie '66" (Richard Berry)
7. The Squires: "Don't You Just Know It" (Huey Smith/Vincent)
8. Jack Bedient & the Chessmen: "I Want You to Know" (Jack Bedient)

==== Side 2 ====
1. The Sires: "Come to Me Baby" (The Sires)
2. The Lincolns: "Come Along and Dream" (Bobby Baxter) — rel. 1969
3. The Express: "Long Green" (L. Easton)
4. The Pastels: "Why Don't You Love Me?" (The Pastels)
5. The Night Walkers: "Sticks and Stones" (McCasland/Hooper)
6. Mr. Lucky and the Gamblers: "Take a Look at Me" (The Gamblers)
7. The Bootmen: "Ain't It the Truth" (The Bootmen) — rel. 1966
8. The Rock-N-Souls: "Not Like You" (S. Rogers/J. Kenfield)

== Volume 8 ==
Highs in the Mid-Sixties, Volume 8

Compilation album
- Released: 1984
- Recorded: Mid-1960s
- Genre: Garage rock, psychedelic rock
- Label: AIP

chronology
Highs in the Mid-Sixties, Volume 7 (1984)	Highs in the Mid-Sixties, Volume 8 (1984)	Highs in the Mid-Sixties, Volume 9 (1984)

Highs in the Mid-Sixties, Volume 8 (subtitled The South) is a compilation album in the Highs in the Mid-Sixties series, featuring recordings that were released in the South excluding Texas (which is covered in 5 separate volumes).

This album was released in 1984 as an LP by AIP Records (as #AIP-10014).

=== Track listing ===
==== Side 1 ====
1. Ravin' Blue: "Love" (A. Christopher, Jr./R. Bernard/L. Nix)
2. Gunga Dins: "Rebecca Rodifer" (M. King/S. Staples)
3. The Midknights: "Pain" (Jerry Wallace)
4. Fly by Nites: "Found Love" (Fly-by-Nites)
5. The Original Dukes: "Ain't About to Lose My Cool" (Hickman/Sonday/Best)
6. Skeptics: "Turn It On" (Wayne Carson)
7. The Moxies: "I'm Gonna Stay" (G. Coryell/C. Cummings)
8. The Rogues: "I Don't Need You" (McDiarmid)

==== Side 2 ====
1. The Hazards: "Hey Joe" (Billy Roberts) — rel. 1966
2. The Vikings: "Come on and Love Me" (C. Putman/C. Nettles)
3. The Surrealistic Pillar: "I Like Girls" (Ed Futch/Eddie Smith)
4. The Rugbys: "Walking the Streets Tonight" (Doug Sahm)
5. The Sants: "Leaving You Baby" (Cirrincione/Wimberley)
6. Ravin' Blue: "It's Not Real" (R. Bernard)
7. The Guilloteens: "Crying All Over My Time" (Dickinson/Hutcherson)
8. Gunga Dins: "No One Cares" (M. King./S. Staples)

== Volume 9 ==
Highs in the Mid-Sixties, Volume 9

Compilation album
- Released: 1984
- Recorded: Mid-1960s
- Genre: Garage rock, psychedelic rock
- Label: AIP

chronology
Highs in the Mid-Sixties, Volume 8	Highs in the Mid-Sixties, Volume 9	Highs in the Mid-Sixties, Volume 10

Highs in the Mid-Sixties, Volume 9 (subtitled Ohio) is a compilation album in the Highs in the Mid-Sixties series, featuring recordings that were released in Ohio.

This album was released in 1984 as an LP by AIP Records (as #AIP-10015).

=== Notes on the tracks ===
Three members of the Choir would form the Raspberries with Eric Carmen in the early 1970s. The Human Beingz changed their name to the Human Beinz when Capitol Records misspelled it on their 1967 hit "Nobody But Me". The label promised to correct the mistake on future releases, but the single's success precluded that possibility.

=== Track listing ===
==== Side 1 ====
1. The Deadlys: "On the Road Again" (John Sebastian)
2. The Gillian Row: "Gloria" (Van Morrison)
3. The Squires: "Batmobile" (Phil Keaggy/Monus)
4. The Denims: "Adler Sock, The" (The Denims)
5. Bocky & the Visions: "The Spirit of '64" (R. Bobbins/J. Harris/T. Styles) — rel. 1964
6. The Statesmen: "Stop and Get a Ticket" (Travers/Coventry)
7. The Pied Pipers: "Hey Joe" (Billy Roberts)
8. The Tree Stumps: "Jennie Lee" (Ron Jankowski)

==== Side 2 ====
1. The Dagenites: "I Don't Want to Try it Again" (Geoff Robinson)
2. The Chylds: "Hey Girl" (J. Lepar/R. Fano/N. Boldi)
3. The Choir: "I'm Going Home" (Dann Klawson)
4. The Outcasts: "Loving You, Sometimes" (Collinsworth)
5. The Sound Barrier: "Hey Hey" (Paul Hess)
6. The Dantes: "Can't Get Enough of Your Love" (Harvey/Wehr)
7. The Human Beingz: "Evil Hearted You" (Graham Gouldman)
8. The Possums: "Stepping Stone" (Tommy Boyce/Bobby Hart)

== Volume 10 ==
Highs in the Mid-Sixties, Volume 10

Compilation album
- Released: 1984
- Recorded: Mid-1960s
- Genre: Garage rock, psychedelic rock
- Label: AIP

chronology
Highs in the Mid-Sixties, Volume 9 (1984)	Highs in the Mid-Sixties, Volume 10 (1984)	Highs in the Mid-Sixties, Volume 11 (1984)

Highs in the Mid-Sixties, Volume 10 (subtitled Wisconsin) is a compilation album in the Highs in the Mid-Sixties series, featuring recordings that were released in Wisconsin.

This album was released in 1984 as an LP by AIP Records (as #AIP-10017).

=== Track listing ===
==== Side 1 ====
1. The Shag: "Stop and Listen" (Ray McCall) — rel. 1967
2. The Wanderer's Best: "The Boat that I Row" (Neil Diamond)
3. The Young Savages: "The Invaders are Coming" (Lenny LaCour)
4. The Faros: "I'm Cryin'" (Eric Burdon/Alan Price)
5. Lord Beverley Moss & the Moss Men: "Please Please What's the Matter" (Beverley Moss)
6. The Noblemen: "Dirty Robber" (Brand Schank) — rel. 1960
7. The Hinge: "Come on Up" (Felix Cavaliere)

==== Side 2 ====
1. Jack & the Beanstalks: "Don't Bug Me" (Jack Tate)
2. Jack & the Beanstalks: "So Many Times" (Jack Tate)
3. The Trodden Path: "Don't Follow Me" (Mike Frommer)
4. Joey Gee & the Come-Ons: "She's Mean" (Joe Giannunzio)
5. The Deverons: "On the Road Again" (Bob Dylan)
6. The Love Society: "You Know How I Feel" (Deliger/Steffen)
7. Rehabilitation Cruise: "I Don't Care What They Say" (L. Owen)

== Volume 11 ==
Highs in the Mid-Sixties, Volume 11

Compilation album
- Released: 1984
- Recorded: Mid-1960s
- Genre: Garage rock, psychedelic rock
- Label: AIP

chronology
Highs in the Mid-Sixties, Volume 10	Highs in the Mid-Sixties, Volume 11	Highs in the Mid-Sixties, Volume 12

Highs in the Mid-Sixties, Volume 11 (subtitled Texas) is a compilation album in the Highs in the Mid-Sixties series, featuring recordings that were released in Texas.

This album was released in 1984 as an LP by AIP Records (as #AIP-10019).

=== Track listing ===
==== Side 1 ====
1. Larry and the Blue Notes: "In and Out" (L. Slater/L. Roquemore)
2. The Buccaneers: "You Got What I Want" (M. Dallon) — rel. 1965
3. Kit and the Outlaws: "Don't Tread on Me" (Kit Massengill)
4. The Chants: "Hypnotized" (David Korfleet)
5. The Visions: "Route 66" (Bobby Troup)
6. The Esquires: "Judgment Day" (Horne/Snellings)
7. The Four More: "Problem Child" — rel. 1966

==== Side 2 ====
1. Chaz & the Classics: "Girl of the 13th Hour" (C. Shian) — rel. 1966
2. Terry & Tommy: "It Ain't No Good to Love Anybody"
3. The By Fives: "I Saw You Walking" (Williams/Stevens)
4. The Staffs: "Another Love" (Raul Altamirano)
5. Five of a Kind: "Never Again" (Wayne/Taylor)
6. Nobody's Children: "Good Times" (Allen Schram)
7. The Bourbons: "Of Old Approximately" (Lee) — rel. 1967

== Volume 12 ==
Highs in the Mid-Sixties, Volume 12

Compilation album
- Released: 1984
- Recorded: Mid-1960s
- Genre: Garage rock, psychedelic rock
- Label: AIP

chronology
Highs in the Mid-Sixties, Volume 11 (1984)	Highs in the Mid-Sixties, Volume 12 (1984)	Highs in the Mid-Sixties, Volume 13 (1984)

Highs in the Mid-Sixties, Volume 12 (subtitled Texas, Part 2) is a compilation album in the Highs in the Mid-Sixties series, featuring recordings that were released in Texas.

This album was released in 1984 as an LP by AIP Records (as #AIP-10021).

=== Track listing ===
==== Side 1 ====
1. Tommy Jett: "Groovy Little Trip" (Tommy Jett)
2. The Derby-Hatville: "Turn into Earth" (The Yardbirds)
3. The Mind's Eye: "Help, I'm Lost" (S. Perrone/L. Cabaza)
4. The New Roadrunners: "Tired of Living" (Gary P. Nunn)
5. The Remaining Few: "Painted Air" (Mike Jones/Robert Specht)
6. The Stereo Shoestring: "On the Road South" (The Stereo Shoestring) — rel. 1968
7. Thursday's Children: "Air-Conditioned Man" (C. Helpinstill) — rel. 1966

==== Side 2 ====
1. The Buckle: "I've Got Something on My Mind" (Cameron/Martin/Brown)
2. The Brentwoods: "Babe, You Know" (Alyse Paradiso) — rel. 1967
3. The Crabs: "Chase Yourself" (R. Leff) — rel. 1967
4. The Trackers: "You Are My World" (The Trackers)
5. The Soul Seekers: "Good Revelations" (The Soul Seekers)
6. The Y'All's: "Run for Your Life" (John Lennon/Paul McCartney)
7. Leo and the Prophets: "Parking Meter" (The Prophets)

== Volume 13 ==
Highs in the Mid-Sixties, Volume 13

Compilation album
- Released: 1984
- Recorded: Mid-1960s
- Genre: Garage rock, psychedelic rock
- Label: AIP

chronology
Highs in the Mid-Sixties, Volume 12	Highs in the Mid-Sixties, Volume 13	Highs in the Mid-Sixties, Volume 14

Highs in the Mid-Sixties, Volume 13 (subtitled Texas, Part 3) is a compilation album in the Highs in the Mid-Sixties series, featuring recordings that were released in Texas.

This album was released in 1984 as an LP by AIP Records (as #AIP-10022).

=== Track listing ===
==== Side 1 ====
1. The Chessmen: "No More" (N. Green)
2. The Briks: "Foolish Baby" (R. Borgen/C. Cotten)
3. Robb London & the Rogues: "Gloria" (Van Morrison)
4. The Fanatics: "I Will Not Be Lonely" (Neal Ford)
5. The Venturie "5": "Good 'n' Bad" (Clark Keith)
6. Mustache Wax: "I'm Gonna Get You" (Eddie DiBiase)
7. The Bards: "Alibis" (Ronny & Rick McLaughlin)

==== Side 2 ====
1. The Barons: "Don't Burn It" (J. Nitzinger)
2. Theze Few: "Dynamite" (D. Feals) — rel. 1966
3. The Madison Revue: "Another Man" (R. Rountree/D. Fisher)
4. The Roots: "Lost One" (Rudy Wyatt)
5. The Night Crawlers: "Let's Move" (Larry L. Priest)
6. The Zone V: "I Cannot Lie" (R. Bartell/E. Davis)
7. The Moon-Dawgs: "Baby as Time Goes By" (Tommy Guarino/Bonnie Fussell)

== Volume 14 ==
Highs in the Mid-Sixties, Volume 14

Compilation album
- Released: 1985
- Recorded: Mid-1960s
- Genre: Garage rock, psychedelic rock
- Label: AIP

chronology
Highs in the Mid-Sixties, Volume 13	Highs in the Mid-Sixties, Volume 14	Highs in the Mid-Sixties, Volume 15

Highs in the Mid-Sixties, Volume 14 (subtitled The Northwest, Part 2) is a compilation album in the Highs in the Mid-Sixties series, featuring recordings that were released in Washington and Oregon. This album was released in 1985 as an LP by AIP Records (somewhat out of order, as #AIP-10020).

=== Notes on the tracks ===
"Sorry Charlie" is a take-off on the long-running series of Charlie the Tuna commercials for StarKist Tuna, complete with faux British accents.

Side one, track 6 is incorrectly credited to "The Statics." The actual artists are Merrilee & the Turnabouts, featuring Merrilee Rush.

=== Track listing ===
==== Side 1 ====
1. Lord Dent & His Invaders: "Wolf Call" (Clayton Watson)
2. The Night People: "Istanbul" (Simon/Kennedy)
3. The Volk Brothers: "Wash Don't Soak" (Val Volk/Jimmy Volk)
4. The Paymarks: "Louise" (Mike Spotts)
5. J. Michael & the Bushmen: "I Need Love" (J. Michael)
6. Merrilee & the Turnabouts: "Tell Me the Truth" (Merrilee Rush/Gerber)
7. The Talismen: "She Was Good" (Wood Cooper)

==== Side 2 ====
1. Sir Raleigh & the Cupons: "Tomorrow's Gonna Be Another Day" (Steve Venet/Tommy Boyce)
2. Jack Bedient & the Chessmen: "Rapunzel" (Jack Bedient)
3. Tom Thumb & the Casuals: "I Should Know" (Brad Miller) — rel. 1965
4. The Scotsmen: "Tuff Enough" (R. Shomer/G. Reynolds) — rel. 1965
5. The Scotsmen: "Sorry, Charlie" (R. Shomer/Lucas/G. Reynolds) — rel. 1965
6. The Rooks: "Bound to Lose" (J. Richie/R. Dangel) — rel. 1965
7. The Rooks: "Gimme a Break" (J. Richie/R. Dangel/B. Webb) — rel. 1965

== Volume 15 ==
Highs in the Mid-Sixties, Volume 15

Compilation album
- Released: 1985
- Recorded: Mid-1960s
- Genre: Garage rock, psychedelic rock
- Label: AIP

chronology
Highs in the Mid-Sixties, Volume 14	Highs in the Mid-Sixties, Volume 15	Highs in the Mid-Sixties, Volume 16

Highs in the Mid-Sixties, Volume 15 (subtitled Wisconsin, Part 2) is a compilation album in the Highs in the Mid-Sixties series, featuring recordings that were released in Wisconsin.

This album was released in 1985 as an LP by AIP Records (as #AIP-10025).

=== Track listing ===
==== Side 1 ====
1. The Baroques: "There's Nothing Left to Do But Cry" (Jay Borkenhagen) - rel. 1967
2. The Shaprels: "A Fool for Your Lies" (The Shaprels)
3. Gord's Horde: "I Don't Care" (D. Nordall)
4. The Cannons: "Days Go By" (The Cannons)
5. Family: "I Wanna Do It"
6. The Wanderer's Rest: "You'll Forget" (Diamond)
7. The Challengers: "Take a Ride on the Jefferson Airplane" (Mike Houlihan)

==== Side 2 ====
1. The Mustard Men: "I Lost My Baby" (Warren P. Wiegratz)
2. The Spacemen: "Same Old Grind" (Skaare/Fondow)
3. The Impalas: "Spoonful" (Willie Dixon)
4. The Mid-Knighters: "Charlena" (M. Chavez/H. Chaney)
5. Joey Gee & the Come-Ons: "You Know – 'Til the End of Time" (Joey Gee & the Come-Ons)
6. Bill Allan & the Fugitives: "Come on and Clap" (Bill Allan)
7. The Medallions: "Leave Me Alone" (Ralph Mullin)
8. The Rehabilitation Cruise: "Mini Skirts"

== Volume 16 ==
Highs in the Mid-Sixties, Volume 16

Compilation album
- Released: 1985
- Recorded: Mid-1960s
- Genre: Garage rock, psychedelic rock
- Label: AIP

chronology
Highs in the Mid-Sixties, Volume 15	Highs in the Mid-Sixties, Volume 16	Highs in the Mid-Sixties, Volume 17

Highs in the Mid-Sixties, Volume 16 (subtitled The Northwest, Part 3) is a compilation album in the Highs in the Mid-Sixties series, featuring recordings that were released in Washington and Oregon.

This album was released in 1985 as an LP by AIP Records (somewhat out of order, as #AIP-10024).

=== Track listing ===
==== Side 1 ====
1. The Raymarks: "Work Song" (Nat Adderley) — rel. 1964
2. (Radio Ad) — rel. 1965
3. The Unusuals: "I'm Walkin' Babe" (Jay Hamilton)
4. Rocky & His Friends: "Riot City" (Park/LaBrache/Gaspard/Denton/Jeff Beals)
5. The Dominions: "I Need Her" (The Dominions) — rel. 1967
6. The Bumps: "Hey Girl" (Terry Robotham) — rel. 1967
7. The Live Five: "Move Over and Let Me Fly" (Steiner/Smith/O'Brien)
8. The Express: "You Gotta Understand" (Dennis Maxwell)

==== Side 2 ====
1. The Navarros: "Tomorrow Is Another Day" (M. Pink) — rel. 1967
2. The Gentlemen Wild: "You Gotta Leave" (Jay Zilka)
3. The Wheel of Fortune: "Before You Leave" (G. Thompson/R. Allen) — rel. 1967
4. Pembrook Ltd.: "Sleepy John" (L. Layton/J. Buchanan)
5. The City Zu: "Too Much, Too Soon, Too Fast" (Jerry Cole)
6. The United Travel Service: "Wind and Stone" (Benjamin Hoff)
7. International Brick: "You Should Be So High" (J. Ussery)

== Volume 17 ==
Highs in the Mid-Sixties, Volume 17

Compilation album
- Released: 1985
- Recorded: Mid-1960s
- Genre: Garage rock, psychedelic rock
- Label: AIP

chronology
Highs in the Mid-Sixties, Volume 16	Highs in the Mid-Sixties, Volume 17	Highs in the Mid-Sixties, Volume 18

Highs in the Mid-Sixties, Volume 17 (subtitled Texas, Part 4) is a compilation album in the Highs in the Mid-Sixties series, of recordings that were released in Texas.

The album was released in 1985 as an LP by AIP Records (as #AIP-10026).

=== Notes on the tracks ===
"We Sell Soul" by the Spades was a regional hit by one of the first bands headed by Roky Erickson. He was one of the founding members of the legendary psychedelic rock band 13th Floor Elevators. The Iguanas on this album are not the same band that launched Iggy Pop's career, although a track by those Iguanas is included on Highs in the Mid-Sixties, Volume 19. The track listed as "The Darkest Hour (Part 1)" is actually the instrumental B-side, Part 2.

=== Track listing ===
==== Side 1 ====
1. The Sparkles: "The U. T." (The Sparkles)
2. S. J. & the Crossroads: "Ooh Poo Pah Doo" (Jessie Hill)
3. S. J. & the Crossroads: "The Darkest Hour (Part 1)" (J. Sergio/S. Messina)
4. The Souncations: "Exit" (Jerry Rojas)
5. The Visions: "Humpty Dumpty" (The Visions)
6. The Spectrum: "Bald Headed Woman" (Talmy)
7. The Gentle'men: "Come On (If You Can)" (B. Russo/E. Hackett) — rel. 1966

==== Side 2 ====
1. Kempy & the Guardians: "Love for a Price" (Pat Davidson)
2. The Roks: "Hey Joe" (Billy Roberts)
3. Lost Generation: "They Tell Me" (Rhodes)
4. The Spades: "We Sell Soul" (Emil Schwartze)
5. Neal Ford and the Fanatics: "Bitter Bells" (Neil Ford/Stringfellow)
6. The Iguanas: "I'm Leaving You Baby" (Alan Melinger)

== Volume 18 ==
Highs in the Mid-Sixties, Volume 18

Compilation album
- Released: 1985
- Recorded: Mid-1960s
- Genre: Garage rock, psychedelic rock
- Label: AIP

chronology
Highs in the Mid-Sixties, Volume 17	Highs in the Mid-Sixties, Volume 18	Highs in the Mid-Sixties, Volume 19

Highs in the Mid-Sixties, Volume 18 (subtitled Colorado) is a compilation album in the Highs in the Mid-Sixties series, featuring recordings that were released in Colorado. This is the only state featured in this series that is limited to only one LP.

This album was released in 1985 as an LP by AIP Records (as #AIP-10027).

=== Notes on the tracks ===
These tracks include several covers, including two Rolling Stones songs ("Nanker Phelge" is a songwriting pseudonym that the band used for collaborative writing efforts on many of their early songs).

Guitarist Bob Webber of the Moonrakers founded Sugarloaf with Jerry Corbetta, who brought in drummer Robert MacVittie and rhythm guitarist Veeder Van Dorn III from this band as well.

The title of the psychedelic instrumental "Music to Smoke Bananas By" refers to the urban legend prevalent in the late 1960s that banana peel scrapings have an LSD-like effect if dried and then smoked like marijuana.

=== Track listing ===
==== Side 1 ====
1. The Astronauts: "Come along Baby" (Stormy Patterson) — rel. 1962
2. The Soul: "Have it All Your Way" (The Soul)
3. The Trolls: "I Don't Recall" (R. Gonzales)
4. The Trolls: "Stupid Girl" (Mick Jagger/Keith Richards)
5. The Poor: "She's Got the Time (She's Got the Changes)" (Tom Shipley) — rel. 1967
6. The Soothsayers: "I Don't Know" (D. VanOmen/G. Finney) — rel. 1966
7. The Moonrakers: "I Don't Believe" (L. E. Paul)
8. Sur Royal Da Count: "Scream Mother Scream" (Joe Yore)

==== Side 2 ====
1. Our Gang: "Careless Love" (D. Duvall)
2. The Moonrakers: "Baby, Please Don't Go" (Big Joe Williams)
3. The Moonrakers: "I'm All Right" (Nanker/Phelge)
4. The Lidos: "Since I Last Saw You" (G. Nale/G. Fick/D. Silvis/R. Saunar)
5. The Rainy Daze: "Fe Fi Fo Fum" (Tim Gilbert/John Carter) — rel. 1967
6. The Doppler Effect: "God Is Alive in Argentina" (The Doppler Effect)
7. The Monocles: "Psychedelic (That's Where it's At)" (Joe Floth/Robb Cassaday/Don Hirschfield/Behm/Hull) — rel. 1966
8. The Elopers: "Music to Smoke Bananas By" (Jay Weatherington) — rel. 1967

== Volume 19 ==
Highs in the Mid-Sixties, Volume 19

Compilation album
- Released: 1985
- Recorded: Mid-1960s
- Genre: Garage rock, psychedelic rock
- Label: AIP

chronology
Highs in the Mid-Sixties, Volume 18	Highs in the Mid-Sixties, Volume 19	Highs in the Mid-Sixties, Volume 20

Highs in the Mid-Sixties, Volume 19 (subtitled Michigan, Part 3) is a compilation album in the Highs in the Mid-Sixties series, featuring recordings that were released in Michigan.

This album was released in 1985 as an LP by AIP Records (as #AIP-10028).

=== Notes on the tracks ===
One of Iggy Pop's first bands was the Iguanas (who are pictured on the cover); the band was formed in 1963 when he was still in high school, and he was the band's drummer. This previously unreleased track comes from early demo tapes and is evidently the first song recorded where he was the songwriter.

"Be Careful With Your Car-Full" (track 4) by the Royal Shandels (Don Gladden, Ron Oswalt, Jeff White, Neil Williams and Carl Zenoni) was recorded in Detroit at Golden World for the National Safety Council back in the days that seat belts were a fairly new addition to cars, and before mandatory seat belt laws were introduced. The M.S.C. wanted to encourage their use, and this was played on national AM radio for about two years.

=== Track listing ===
==== Side 1 ====
1. The Tempests: "Look Away" (Sevison) — rel. 1963
2. The Saharas: "This Mornin'" (P. F. Sloan)
3. The Decisions: "Tears, Tears" (The Decisions)
4. The Royal Shandels: "Be Careful with Your Car-Full" (Don Gladden/Ron Oswalt)
5. The JuJus: "I'm Really Sorry" (Rick Stevens)
6. The French Church: "Without Crying" (MacDonald/Cleary) — rel. 1966
7. The Oxford 5: "Gloria" (Van Morrison)

==== Side 2 ====
1. The Iguanas: "Again and Again"
2. The Beaubiens: "Time Passed"
3. The Bells of Rhymny: "She'll be Back" (Burdick/Parsons/Dick Wagner)
4. The Chessmen: "You Can't Catch Me" (Finchum/Motley/Evans/Griebe)
5. The French Church: "Slapneck 1943" (Spratta/MacDonald)
6. The Assortment: "Bless Our Hippie Home" (Fenstock/Roderie)
7. The Orange Wedge: "From the Tomb to the Womb" (I.S.P.)

== Volume 20 ==
Highs in the Mid-Sixties, Volume 20

Compilation album
- Released: 1985
- Recorded: Mid-1960s
- Genre: Garage rock, psychedelic rock
- Label: AIP

chronology
Highs in the Mid-Sixties, Volume 19	Highs in the Mid-Sixties, Volume 20	Highs in the Mid-Sixties, Volume 21

Highs in the Mid-Sixties, Volume 20 is a compilation album in the Highs in the Mid-Sixties series; it is subtitled L.A., Part 4 and features recordings that were released in Los Angeles.

This album was released in 1985 as an LP by AIP Records (as #AIP-10029).

=== Track listing ===
==== Side 1 ====
1. Rain: "E.S.P." (Larry Self) — rel. 1966
2. The Mugwumps: "Bald Headed Woman" (Shel Talmy)
3. The Green Beans: "Who Needs You" (Grieger/Bozile)
4. The Gigolos: "She's My Baby" (Hutman)
5. The Human Expression: "Calm Me Down" (Jim Foster/Jim Quarles)
6. The Rumblers: "Don't Need You No More" (A. Lloyd/W. Matteson)
7. Aftermath: "Gloria" (Van Morrison)

==== Side 2 ====
1. The Agents: "Gotta Help Me" (Richards/Todd/Marky/Shay) — rel. 1965
2. The Avengers: "It's Hard to Hide" (G. Likens)
3. The Avengers: "Open Your Eyes" (G. Blake)
4. The Bees: "Forget Me Girl" (Robert Zinner)
5. The Dovers: "The Third Eye" (The Dovers) — rel. 1966
6. The No-Na-Mees: "Just Wanna Be Myself" (Doug Wareham)
7. The Last Word: "Sleepy Hollow" (Berry Abernathy)

== Volume 21 ==
Highs in the Mid-Sixties, Volume 21

Compilation album
- Released: 1985
- Recorded: Mid-1960s
- Genre: Garage rock, psychedelic rock
- Label: AIP

chronology
Highs in the Mid-Sixties, Volume 20 (1985)	Highs in the Mid-Sixties, Volume 21 (1985)	Highs in the Mid-Sixties, Volume 22 (1985)

Highs in the Mid-Sixties, Volume 21 (subtitled Ohio, Part 2) is a compilation album in the Highs in the Mid-Sixties series, featuring recordings that were released in Ohio.

This album was released in 1985 as an LP by AIP Records (as #AIP-10030).

=== Track listing ===
==== Side 1 ====
1. Richard Pash & the Backdoor Society: "I'm the Kind" (Dull/Pash)
2. The Unknown Kind: "Who Cares" (Marren/Blechler)
3. It's Them: "Baby I Still Want Your Lovin'" (Steve Welkom) -- rel. 1966
4. The Epics: "White Collar Home" (Richards/Knox/Miller)
5. The Endless: "Prevailing Darkness" (J. McAtee/R. McAtee)
6. The Endless: "Tomorrow's Song" (J. McAtee/R. McAtee)
7. The Beau Denturies: "Straight Home" (Burnman/Harriman)

==== Side 2 ====
1. The Pictorian Skiffuls: "In Awhile" (Smith/McIntosh) – rel. 1965
2. Baron Thomas & the Blue Crystals: "Tension" (Baron Thomas)
3. The Panics: "Treat Me Right" (Don Feldman)
4. The Hazards: "Tinted Green" (Jason C. Lee)
5. The Wild Thing: "A.C.I.D." (S. Owsley)
6. The Four O'Clock Balloon: "Dark Cobble Street" (Sheppard) – rel. 1967
7. The Young Generation: "Paperback Minds" (McCain/Simoson/Brink)

== Volume 22 ==
Highs in the Mid-Sixties, Volume 22

Compilation album
- Released: 1985
- Recorded: Mid-1960s
- Genre: Garage rock, psychedelic rock
- Label: AIP

chronology
Highs in the Mid-Sixties, Volume 21	Highs in the Mid-Sixties, Volume 22	Highs in the Mid-Sixties, Volume 23

Highs in the Mid-Sixties, Volume 22 (subtitled The South, Part 2) is a compilation album in the Highs in the Mid-Sixties series, featuring recordings that were released in the South excluding Texas (which is covered in 5 separate volumes).

This album was released in 1985 as an LP by AIP Records (as #AIP-10031).

=== Notes on the tracks ===
Daze of the Week is actually from Tacoma, Washington, not Mississippi as the liner notes on this album claimed. The band was active from 1966 to 1967 and put out one single in a very limited release.

=== Track listing ===
==== Side 1 ====
1. Daze of the Week: "One Night Stand" (Gregg Gagliardi) — rel. 1966
2. Dick Watson 5: "Cold Clear World" (Dick Watson)
3. The Nomads: "Time Remains" (Fontenot/Doucet)
4. Creatures, Inc.: "Letters of Love" (Christie/Phillips)
5. Evil Enc. Group: "Hey You" (Gent/Micheal/Dunlap/James)
6. Evil Enc. Group: "The Point Is" (Gent/Micheal/Dunlap/James)
7. The Flys: "Reality Composition No. 1" (The Flys)

==== Side 2 ====
1. The Counts IV : "Spoonful" (Willie Dixon) — rel. 1967
2. Jimmy & the Offbeats : "Stronger than Dirt" (T. Guarino/B.G. Fussell/D. Short)
3. Jimmy & the Offbeats: "I Ain't No Miracle Worker" (Nancie Mantz/Annette Tucker)
4. The Rondels: "One More Chance" (The Rondels)
5. Rick & Ronnie: "Don't Do Me this Way"
6. The 5: "I'm No Good"
7. The Countdowns: "Cover of Night" (Don Griffin/Don Strickland)

== Volume 23 ==
Highs in the Mid-Sixties, Volume 23

Compilation album
- Released: 1986
- Recorded: Mid-1960s
- Genre: Garage rock, psychedelic rock
- Label: AIP

chronology
Highs in the Mid-Sixties, Volume 22	Highs in the Mid-Sixties, Volume 23

Highs in the Mid-Sixties, Volume 23 (subtitled Texas, Part 5) is the final compilation album in the Highs in the Mid-Sixties series, featuring recordings that were released in Texas. This is one of five volumes in the series that collects songs by Texas bands; the others are Highs in the Mid-Sixties, Volume 11, Highs in the Mid-Sixties, Volume 12, Highs in the Mid-Sixties, Volume 13, and Highs in the Mid-Sixties, Volume 17.

This album was released in 1986 as an LP by AIP Records (as #AIP-10038).

=== Track listing ===
==== Side 1 ====
1. The Wind: "Don't Take Your Love Away" (L. C. Johnson)
2. The Lost Generation: "Let Me Out" (Rhodes/Keating)
3. Gaylon Ladd: "Her Loving Way" (Gaylon Latimer) — rel. 1965
4. Kenny Wayne & the Kamotions: "A Better Day's a Comin'" (Kenny Wayne Hagler)
5. Larry Mack: "Last Day of the Dragon" (Larry Stanley) — rel. 1966
6. Wilshire Express: "Lose Your Money (But Don't Lose Your Mind)" (Denny Laine/Mike Pinder)
7. Jimmy C. & the Chelsea Five: "Leave Me Alone" (S. Celsur)

==== Side 2 ====
1. The Blox: "Hangin' Out" (R. Turner)
2. Gaylon Ladd: "Repulsive Situation" (Gaylon Latimer)
3. Sterling Damon: "Rejected" (M. D. Gilmore) — rel. 1966
4. The Shayds: "Search the Sun" (S. Bailey)
5. The Children: "Enough of What I Need" (B. Ash/Quillian Marechal)
6. Sweet Smoke: "Morning Dew" (T. Rose/B. Dobson) — rel. 1968
