= It's a Cry'n Shame =

Single by The Gentlemen
- A-side: "You Can't Be True"
- Released: 1966
- Recorded: 1966
- Genre: Garage rock
- Length: 2:32
- Label: Vandan
- Songwriter(s): Seab Meador, Mike Kelley
- Producer(s): Tom Brown

"It's a Cry'n Shame" is a song written by Seab Meador and Mike Kelley and was recorded in 1966 by the Gentlemen, an American garage rock band from Dallas, Texas who were active between 1964 and 1968. It was originally released as the B-side to "You Can't Be True" but has become by far the better-known song. "It's a Cry'n Shame" has been included in several garage rock compilations and is now recognized as one of the greatest songs in the genre.

== History ==
=== Background ===
'"It's a Cry'n Shame" was recorded in 1966 by the Gentlemen a garage rock band from Oak Cliff, a section of Dallas, Texas, who were active from 1964 to 1968. The song was written by Seab Meador and Mike Kelley, who were both guitarists and vocalists in the band. The song heavily drenched in fuzz-treated guitar effects reflects the band's direction which was guided by Seab Meador, whose tastes gravitated towards the harder-rocking and more blues-based English bands such as the Rolling Stones, the Animals, the Kinks, and particularly the Yardbirds, who whose lead guitarist of the time, Jeff Beck, was a key influence on his own playing. The songs' lyrics deal with sadness and heartbreak and are sung with an impassioned vocal by Kelly backed by a frantic and intense performance from the band highlighted by Meador's guitar leads.

In 1965 the band went to Sumet Recording studio and recorded an unreleased acetate of two songs, "Beg, Borrow of Steal" and "Here I Cannot Stay." The Gentlemen also cut a demo acetate of "It's a Cry'n Shame," which would be re-recorded the following year for official release. This unit (with and without Jimmy Randall) played throughout 1965. Towards the end of the year fellow Oak Cliff musician Jimmie Vaughan, later of the Fabulous Thunderbirds, did a several month stint with the group. In early 1966, the roster that most consider the definitive lineup of the group and that recorded the officially released version of "It's a Cry'n Shame," included Seab Meador on lead guitar and vocals, Mike Kelley on guitar and vocals, Tim Justice on drums, as well as new members Bruce Bland on bass and Tommy Turner on keyboards. This incarnation solidified into a driving rock band that was a popular live act. They played venues such as Louann’s Club and The Studio Club in Dallas and Panther A’Go-Go and The Box in Ft. Worth. Later that year, The Gentlemen opened for James Brown at the Dallas Convention Center. The Gentlemen also opened for Mitch Ryder and The Detroit Wheels and The Beau Brummels at Louann’s in 1966.

=== Recording and release ===
Tom Brown, president of Vandan Records heard the Gentlemen play at LouAnn’s Club in Dallas, and wondered if the band could do some writing with him and Gene Garretson, his arranger. After several weeks, the band came up with two songs, "You Can’t Be True," a ballad and the hard-rocking fuzz-drenched "It’s a Cry’n Shame." The gentler "You Can’t Be True," was chosen to be the A-side and a considerable amount of time and expense was lavished on it. Whereas "It’s a Cry’n Shame" was recorded quickly, with Mike Kelley on vocals, only requiring a couple of takes. According to Justice:

We liked "Cry’n Shame" better, but Gene spent a lot of time arranging violins and multiple tracks for ‘You Can’t Be True’ so that was the track they pushed. It took us nearly two weeks to record ‘You Can’t Be True’, and as a complete after-thought, 2 takes and probably 1 hour to slam down ‘It’s a Cry’n Shame’. Therein lies the genuine spontaneity that makes it pure straight ahead punk rock, I suppose. ...Seab Meador had a gaping hole in the center of his Vox Super Beatle so that he could stick his guitar neck inside to get the Fuzz tone that is prevalent on "Cry’n Shame."

Tom Brown had or two thousand copies pressed and sent them to several deejays her knew in places such as Detroit, Philadelphia, and Boston. A few weeks later Brown showed the band members a copy of the January 1967 edition of Record World Magazine, which included the B-side song "It's a Cry'n Shame" alongside "Somebody to Love" by Jefferson Airplane, in its Four-Star Rating column of hits to watch. The song received airplay on KLIF and KNOK radio stations in Dallas, upping the band's local profile considerably. The Gentlemen played a “go-go” show on the bill with several other bands at a large auditorium in south Dallas. The promoters had to provide police protection for the band, who were greeted by a queue of screaming girls begging for autographs. According to Justice: "...we were very happy, as this was about as close to "That 60's British Rock Star Magic" as a bunch of 16-year old kids from Dallas would ever get."

=== Subsequent events ===
However, the expense pressing all of the records, as well as recording the intended A-side left Vandan Records owner Tom Brown out of money. According to Justice: "Shortly after he showed up with the magazine, we showed up at his home to find a for sale sign and no furniture. We would find our later that he was down to his last cash and skipped town to avoid creditors. We never saw him again, but read that he moved to Los Angeles to start over. He died there not long after."

In 1967 Seab Meador left The Gentlemen, and did stints in Dallas bands such as the Bridge. The Gentlemen disbanded in early 1968. Seab Meador and the Gentlemen's original bass player Jimmie Randal went on to form bands such as the Hurricanes, a Houston-based band, and later the Werewolves in the late 1970s, were managed and produced by former Rolling Stones Svengali, Andrew Loog Oldham, who cut two albums for RCA records. On January 24, 1980, Seab Meador died of a brain tumour. According to Randall: "Seab was a great friend I was at the hospital the night before he died. He taught me a lot. I miss him still."

=== Legacy ===
"It’s a Cry’n Shame," is often mentioned as one of the greatest songs in garage rock. It has been referred to by the G45 Legends listings as “One of the top 10 tracks to play to anyone you need to convert to ‘60s-garageism." In Mike Markesich's Teenbeat Mayhem, based on the balloting of a panel of noted writers and garage rock experts, the song is rated as a ten out of ten, and in the section listing the 1000 greatest garage rock recordings, is ranked #2, second only to the 13th Floor Elevators' "You're Gonna Miss Me." "It's a Cry’n Shame," has appeared on several compilations such as Pebbles, Volume 5, Essential Pebbles, Volume 1, and Fort Worth Teen Scene! Volume 3. The demo acetate version is included on the Back from the Grave, Volume 9 compilation. The song has been featured on Little Steven’s Underground Garage and on Sirius Satellite Radio and on Bill Kelly’s Black Hole of Rock and Roll on New York’s WFMU.

== Personnel ==
- Seab Meador (guitar, vocals)
- Mike Kelley (guitar, vocals)
- Bruce Bland (bass guitar)
- Tommy Turner (keyboards)
- Tim Justice (drums)

== Discography ==
- "You Can't Be True" b/w "It's a Cry’n Shame" (Vandan 8304/3, rel. 1966)
