= The Crusaders (garage band) =

American garage rock band

- Origin: Los Angeles, California, U.S.
- Genres: Psychedelic rock, garage rock
- Years active: 1966–67
- Labels: Tower; Capitol
- Past members: Danny Altchuler; Fred Barnett; Jeff Barnett; Walt Flannery; Mike Joyce

The Crusaders was an American garage rock band, whose 1966 album Make a Joyful Noise with Drums and Guitars is considered one of the first gospel rock releases, or even "the first record of Christian rock".

== Band members ==
=== Foundation members ===
- Daniel Leonard Altchuler (born 21 September 1946)—rhythm guitar (1966–1969)
- Fred Jay Barnett (18 March 1950 – 26 July 2024)—lead guitar (1966–1969)
- Jeffrey Arlen Barnett (29 December 1949 – 13 May 1989 in Corvallis, Oregon)—drums, percussion (1966–1969)
- Walter M. Flannery (born 16 December 1947);—keyboards (1966–1969)
- Michael Craig Joyce (27 July 1948 – 14 February 2008)—bass (1966–1969)

=== Additions ===
- Lana Victoria Hale (born 5 October 1952)—vocals (1967)
- Bonnie Ruth Blunt (born 10 June 1951 in Los Angeles)—vocals (1967–1969) replaced Hale

== History ==
The Crusaders was a five-member band that evolved out of surf bands Scope Unlimited and The Sidewinders who got together while attending Westchester High School, Los Angeles. Scope Unlimited, which included Fred Barnett, his brother Jeff Barnett, Dan Altchuler and Walt Flannery, played mostly at recreational centers in Westchester and school dances. According to lead guitarist Fred Barnett, he was taught how to play surf style lead guitar by Tom Stanton, the original guitarist of The Crossfires from the Planet Mars, another Westchester surf band, who became The Turtles in 1965. Scope Unlimited rehearsed for eight years in Barnett's parents' garage, played songs by Duane Eddy, Dick Dale, the Surfaris, and the Pyramids, and recorded a surf music "Square Dance" and a surf instrumental written by Fred Barnett.

=== Freddy and the Fanatics ===
While still students at Westchester High School, Altchuler and Flannery created a new band named Freddy and The Fanatics, incorporating the Barnett brothers and Mike Joyce. According to Fred Barnett, "one of Walt Flannery's trademarks as our lead singer was to wear either a biker jacket or a monk's robe with chains on stage. Then when he would start to sing, usually a Rolling Stones song, he'd bite down on packets of ketchup so it would look as though he was spitting up huge amounts of blood".

=== The Crusaders (1966–67) ===
By 1966 the band was signed by Tower Records, a subsidiary of Capitol Records. and their name was changed to The Crusaders. While the band was described as: "five sincere young men ... who have chosen the Big Beat as the means of expressing the religious faith", Flannery and Joyce were both raised as Roman Catholics, while Altchuler and the Barnett brothers were raised in liberal Jewish families. The Crusaders were "one of the first on the scene with a “contemporary musical expression: The Beat”".

==== "Little Drummer Boy"/ "Battle Hymn of the Republic" (1966) ====
The Crusaders' debut release was a single produced by the newly created No.1 Productions of veteran arranger-conductor Hank Levine, who was previously the A&R director for Colpix Records, who had produced songs for The Monkees' Davy Jones, and psychedelic hard rock band The Other Half, and record producer Larry Goldberg, who had previously been Western sales manager at Hanna-Barbera Records, featuring "The Little Drummer Boy" backed with "The Battle Hymn of the Republic" (Tower 286), that was released in early November 1966. A reviewer for Billboard magazine described the single as: "A new concept of the holiday material features a solid rock dance beat with a straight well done vocal. A controversial conversation piece that should prove a sales giant".

==== The Crusaders Make a Joyful Noise with Drums and Guitar (1966) ====
Their debut album The Crusaders Make a Joyful Noise with Drums and Guitar, which was also recorded in 1966, and produced by Levine and Goldberg, was released by the middle of November 1966. The album's liner notes claim: "For the first time, God is praised in song through the most contemporary musical expression: The Beat!". Jesus music historian David Di Sabatino indicates that "this album is important in establishing that there were a handful of artists performing 'gospel rock' music well before Larry Norman or any other of the Jesus music artists emerged in the early 1970s". Kelly Lawler argues that "One of the very first releases that could clearly be considered a Christian Rock release, the Crusaders' Make a Joyful Noise with Drums and Guitars, stands as a landmark LP".

Lawler describes the album: "By today's standards, the band really sounds quite subdued. Heavy emphasis on group harmony, and a reliance on Christian standards ... keep the LP from being heralded as an all-out Garage assault. However, they do whip up a snazzy rendition of "Little Drummer Boy" - no kidding. The rest of the material was apparently penned by the band with the exception of the Rodgers-Hammerstein composition, "You'll Never Walk Alone." With the just the right amount of fuzz-tinged guitar and bass, coupled with enticing organ, the band's Garage roots remain firmly planted, yet not quite the "rocking, muscular, explosive, sound-power" lauded in the LP's liner notes. ... One could certainly make a strong argument for the Crusaders blazing the trail. After all, who predates this LP as far as a straight rock band singing clearly religious music? Yes, Elvis Presley and Jack Scott both released Gospel LPs, but neither could be confused with a rock album. This and the overall quality of the music have contributed to the album's increased notoriety among collectors. Surprisingly the Crusaders had the backing of a label, Tower, with fairly broad distribution".

Kenn Scott described the album as: "This one’s got the heaviest garage sound for the era, ‘Praise We The Lord’ probably being the closest Christian music ever got to the raw punk energy of early Who (it’s actually a rip-off of The Yardbird’s tune ‘You’re A Better Man Than I’). The irresistibly catchy twangy pop of ‘With The Lord At Our Side’ coupled with the Association-like title cut prove the band’s own compositions to be the best. Solidly electric sound throughout, plenty of riffs, solid drumming, some Duane Eddy-derived leads on beat interpretations of ‘Battle Hymn’ and ‘Onward Christian Soldiers’ that probably caused a few stirs among the ecclesia. For beat sounds this side of the Big Pond, this one’s the top banana. Both stereo and mono versions exist with subtle differences (note the two entirely different guitar solos on ‘With The Lord At Our Side’)". Another reviewer described this album: "While this was clearly a secular album (as far as I’m aware one of the first major label releases clearly intended to tap the youth market), the mixture of traditional hymns and handful of originals were cloaked in an extremely mid-1960s pop and garage vibe. While the band didn’t seem to have a true lead singer (most of the songs have ‘group’ vocals), they boasted an accomplished lead guitarist in Altchular (‘Praise We the Lord’ served as a nice showcase for his chops), with the rest of the band also quite good. It sounds kind of strange, but given the band’s earnestness and talent, if you could overlook the occasionally cringe-inducing lyrics (check out ‘What Is Man’), tracks like ‘Little Drummer Boy‘, ’God Lives’ and ‘Praise We the Lord’ could easily have been confused for something by their better known non-secular competitors (think Tower label mates The Standells). Elsewhere harmony-rich pop tracks like ‘You'll Never Walk Alone’, ‘With the Lord On Your Side’ and ‘ Make a Joyful Noise’ bore more than a passing resemblance to The Association, while their covers of ‘Battle Hymn of the Republic’ and ‘Onward Christian Soldiers’ offered up a nice introduction to Duane Eddy-styled rock".

==== "Make a Joyful Noise" / "Praise We the Lord" (1967) ====
In July 1967 Capitol Records released a single "Make a Joyful Noise", backed with "Praise We the Lord" (Capitol 72481), with both songs previously appearing on The Crusaders Make a Joyful Noise with Drums and Guitar.

=== The Love Exchange (1967–68) ===
The Love Exchange
- Origin: Los Angeles, California, U.S.
- Genres: psychedelic rock, garage rock
- Years active: 1967–1969
- Labels: Uptown Records; Tower Records
- Past members: Danny Altchuler; Fred Barnett; Jeff Barnett; Walt Flannery; Mike Joyce; Lana Hale; Bonnie Blunt

By 1967 their manager Barry Kaye, who was "a real Hollywood creep ... [who] took every penny we made off of some real big gigs", persuaded The Crusaders to change their name to The Love Exchange, and moved to San Francisco, California. According to Richie Unterberger: "The Love Exchange were a typical support-level Los Angeles band of the psychedelic era, right down to their name. After experimenting briefly with 14-year-old Lana V. Hale, the only daughter of actor Alan Hale Jr., famous as the skipper on Gilligan's Island, as their female lead singer, they replaced Hale with 16-year-old lead singer Bonnie Blunt, described as "the group's strongest asset, giving them the competent vocals in the soaring, folky Mamas & the Papas/early Jefferson Airplane style", and whose voice was described as "a heavenly hybrid of Grace Slick and Elaine "Spanky" McFarlane [that] burns bright as the sun". Their sound was described as "the perfect soundtrack for a Griffith Park Love-In". By 1967 they were signed by Uptown Records, a subsidiary of MCA Records.

==== "Swallow the Sun" (1967) ====
By late November 1967 The Love Effect released a single "Swallow the Sun" (written by John Merrill) (backed by "Meadow Memory") (Uptown Records 755), which is described as the band's "chief claim to fame", and "a nice folk-rock-psychedelic tune that's emblematic of the time with its trippily optimistic lyrics, garage-like Mamas & the Papas female-male harmonies, and swirling organ". "Swallow the Sun" was "a re-titled cover of 'Dark On You Now' (with some different lyrics) by the Peanut Butter Conspiracy", which had previously been recorded by Merrill's previous band, The Ashes. The song was anthologized on the Los Angeles portion of the Highs in the Mid-Sixties series, and also on the folk-rock volume of the vinyl Nuggets series on Rhino in the 1980s.

==== Love Exchange (1968) ====
The Love Exchange's eponymous 1968 album Love Exchange was recorded in one day at Leo de Gar Kulka's Golden State Recorders Studios at Harrison Street, San Francisco, produced by Number One Productions of Larry Goldberg, who "put his name on our songs", and was credited with writing most of the songs, with the exception of "the appropriately melancholy and ghostly 'Ballad of a Sad Man' (written by bassist Mike Joyce)". In an act of "psychsploitation", Goldberg took some of the LP's backing tracks and used them on a soundtrack album for a musical titled How Now, Dow Jones, credited there to the Floor Traders". These songs were "Step to the Rear" and "Live a Little", both with lyrics by Carolyn Leigh and music by Elmer Bernstein. The original soundtrack album "How Now, Dow Jones" was released by RCA Victor (RCA LSO-1142/ RCA LOC-1142) by January 1968.

In April 1968 Love Exchange was released without the two Broadway songs, and received a favorable rating by Billboard magazine. However, Richie Unterberger described this album: "In addition to featuring "Swallow the Sun," [it] had an assortment of minor-league psych-folk-pop crossover efforts, few of them written by the band. ... These were pretty shallow garage-psych-folk-rock efforts with their utopian rose-colored lyrics and organ-modal-guitar combinations, like a minor league Peanut Butter Conspiracy (who weren't such major talents themselves)".

The Love Exchange played often in Los Angeles, including gigs at the Pandora's Box and other Sunset Strip clubs, the Los Angeles Sports Arena, and at some festivals, but broke up after appearing at the Newport '69 Pop Festival in June 1969.

=== Charity (1969) ===
Charity
- Origin: Los Angeles, California, U.S.
- Genres: psychedelic rock, garage rock
- Years active: 1969
- Label: Uni Records
- Past members: Jeff Oxman; James Peters; Walt Flannery; John Cortinas; Kent Henry

After The Love Exchange disbanded, Walt Flannery moved to Los Angeles and became a member of a band called Charity. The other members of Charity were Jeff Oxman (vocals), James Peters, John Cortinas, and Kent Henry, who later became a member of Steppenwolf, played guitar on this album. In 1969 Charity was signed to Uni Records, managed by Barry Kaye, who also produced their only single: "Never Change Your Mind" (written by Oxman), backed by "I Still Love You" (Uni 55159).

==== Charity Now (1969) ====
Their only album Charity Now (Uni 73061), which was released in 1969 by Uni Records, contained songs written by members of The Love Exchange, although they "never received royalties for anything, though we wrote half of, what I admit, was total crap". The Blossoms provided backing vocals for this album.

== Later years ==
- Daniel Altchuler graduated from Westchester High School in 1964, earned an Associate of Arts degree in Social Sciences from Santa Monica City College, after which he went to California State University, Long Beach where he received his Bachelor of Science in Business Administration and Marketing, before graduating from California School of Podiatric Medicine in 1975 with a Doctor of Podiatric Medicine degree. Altchuler married Eileen Louise Haworth in Las Vegas on 27 June 1970, and is currently on staff at Santa Monica UCLA Medical Center;
- Walter Flannery graduated from Westchester High School in 1966, and from California State University, Long Beach in 1971, before marrying Bonnie Blunt on 7 August 1971 in Los Angeles.
- Fred Barnett graduated from Westchester High School in 1968, graduated from Sonoma State University in 1973, married Janet Joy "Jan" Sax (born 3 July 1949 in Los Angeles) on 31 July 1977 in Los Angeles. moved to Kailua, Hawaii in 1981, and is a founding member of Half-Naked Savages, a jazz, swing and acoustic rock band;
- Jeff Barnett died in Corvallis, Oregon on 13 May 1989;
- Mike Joyce died in 2008.
- Lana Hale married Robert Odom on 27 August 1975 at Fallon, Nevada;
- Bonnie Blunt married Walter Flannery on 7 August 1971 in Los Angeles.

== Discography ==
=== The Crusaders (1966–67) ===
==== Singles ====
- "Little Drummer Boy" b/w "Battle Hymn of the Republic" (Tower 286) (November 1966);
- "Make a Joyful Noise" b/w "Praise We the Lord" (Capitol 72481) Canada (July 1967)

==== Album ====
- Make a Joyful Noise with Drums and Guitars (Tower T-5048; ST-5048) (1966)

Track list: Side 1:

1. "Little Drummer Boy" (Simeone – Onorati – Davis) – 2:42
2. "Battle Hymn of the Republic" (Lyrics: Julia Ward Howe (1861); Music: William Steffe (1855). Arranged by The Crusaders) – 2:10
3. "God Lives" (The Crusaders) – 2:07
4. "You’ll Never Walk Alone" (Richard Rodgers – Oscar Hammerstein II) – 1:56
5. "With the Lord On Your Side" (The Crusaders) – 2:38

Side 2:

1. "Praise We the Lord" (The Crusaders) – 2:54
2. "What Is Man" (The Crusaders) – 2:00
3. "He's Got the Whole World in His Hands" (traditional – arranged by The Crusaders) – 2:26
4. "Onward Christian Soldiers" (instrumental) (traditional – arranged by The Crusaders) – 1:44
5. "Make a Joyful Noise" (The Crusaders) – 2:13

=== The Love Exchange (1967–69) ===
==== Single ====
- "Meadow Memory" b/w "Swallow the Sun" (Uptown Records 755) (1967)

==== Album ====
- Love Exchange (Tower ST-5115) (1968)

Track listing:

1. "Get Out Of My Life, Woman"
2. "Swallow the Sun" (John Merrill)
3. "Flying High"
4. "Meadow Memory"
5. "Saturday Night Flight 505"
6. "Give Up On Love"
7. "Two-O-Tango"
8. "Ballad Of A Sad Man" (Mike Joyce)
9. "Nothing At All"
10. "Mrs. Ansel Griffith"

Bonus tracks on CD release (Sundazed SC 6113) (2001):

1. "Boston"
2. "Live A Little" (Lyrics: Carolyn Leigh; Music: Elmer Bernstein - Included in the musical How Now, Dow Jones)
3. "Step To The Rear" (Lyrics: Carolyn Leigh; Music: Elmer Bernstein - Included in the musical How Now, Dow Jones)
4. "Get Out Of My Life, Woman" (alt. take)
5. "Meadow Memory" (alt. take)
6. "Swallow The Sun" (alt. take)

Personnel:

- Bonnie Blunt (vocals, tambourine)
- Fred Barnett (6-string guitar)
- Dan Altchuler (12-string guitar)
- Walt Flannery (organ)
- Mike Joyce (bass guitar)
- Jeff Barnett (drums)

==== Compilation albums ====
- The Love Exchange - "Swallow the Sun", Highs In The Mid-Sixties Vol. 3 - L.A. '67 Mondo Hollywood A Go-Go (AIP Records #AIP-10005) USA (1983)
- The Love Exchange - "Swallow the Sun", Nuggets, Vol. 10: Folk Rock (Rhino RNLP/RNC 70034) USA (1986)
- The Love Exchange - "Swallow The Sun (Dark On You Now)", Crystallize Your Mind: Nuggets from the Golden State (Big Beat CDWIKD 131) UK (1994)
- Clair Hicks & Love Exchange - "Push Push (In The Bush)", Best Of Personal Records (Hot Productions HTCD 3) USA (1989)
- Pam Todd and Love Exchange - "Let's Get Together", Star Funk Vol. 38 (Unidisc SPLK-7338) Canada (1996)

=== Charity (1969) ===
==== Single ====
- "Never Change Your Mind" (Jeff G. Oxman) b/w "I Still Love You" (Uni 55159) (1969)

==== Album ====
- Charity Now (Uni 73061) (1969)

Track list:
Side 1:
1. "All My Life"
2. "Summer"
3. "I Still Love You"
4. "Hanging On To You"
5. "Scorpio"

Side 2:
1. "Never Change Your Mind" (Jeff G. Oxman)
2. "Please Stay"
3. "Roll With It"
4. "Freedom's Coming!"

Personnel:

- Jeff Oxman
- James Peters
- John Cortinas
- Kent Henry (guitar)
- Walt Flannery (keyboards)
- The Blossoms (vocals)
