= Mr. Lucky and the Gamblers =

American garage rock band

Mr. Lucky and the Gamblers were an American garage rock band that originated from Newport, Oregon. The band was founded by Mike Parker (Mr. Lucky) and 'Bud' Garrison in 1964 and soon became one of the most popular groups in the Pacific Northwest, with fans throughout Oregon, Washington, Idaho, Northern California and Western Canada. Their popularity was due to their hard-driving sound and by the success of several recordings. "Take a Look at Me", which received considerable air time on local radio stations, was their most notable contribution. The band's popularity waned in the late 1960s when 'hippie' music started becoming popular. Mike Parker left the band in 1967 and the band dissolved about a year later.

In the decades to follow, "Take a Look at Me", "I Told You Once Before", "Alice Designs" and "You Don't Need Me", have appeared on at least a dozen compilation CDs that are still available on the market, such as Highs in the Mid-Sixties, Volume 7. Their songs still appear on radio station play lists and a following has even migrated to clubs and radio stations in Germany in recent years.

In the summer of 2001, the band reunited for a one-time performance at the annual Seymour picnic at Oaks Amusement Park in Portland, Oregon. Many of the core members are still alive and well, although only a couple are still active as performing musicians.

== Selected discography ==
- "Take A Look At Me"/"I Told You Once Before", 7", 1966
- "Alice Designs (LSD Signs)"/"You Don't Need Me", 7", 1967

== Members ==
- Mike Parker (1941-2012): Keyboards
- Howell 'Bud' Garrison: Bass
- Willy Reinen: Guitar
- Jim Dunlap: Vocals
- Jim Graziano: Drums
- Alan Gunter: Guitar
- Jeff Hawks: Vocals
- Dave Maitland: Guitar
- Gregg Perry: Keyboards
- Denny Randall: Saxophone
- Carl Wilson: Guitar
- Len Hansen: Manager
- Jon Lankford: Bass
- Kevin Davis: Drums

=== Former members ===
- Norm Smith: Drums
