= Back from the Grave, Volume 10 =

Compilation album
- Released: 2015
- Recorded: 1960s
- Genres: Garage rock; protopunk
- Label: Crypt

chronology
Back from the Grave, Volume 9 (2015)	Back from the Grave, Volume 10 (2015)

CD edition
- Back from the Grave, Volume 9

Back from the Grave, Volume 10, released on LP and CD in 2015, is the tenth and to this date latest installment in the Back from the Grave series of garage rock compilations. As indicated in the subheading which reads "Snarling Snotty Mid 60s Teenage Garage Punk Hoot!," this collection consists of many songs which display the rawer and more aggressive side of the genre and are often characterized by the use of fuzztone-distorted guitars and rough vocals. In typical fashion, the set generally excludes psychedelic, folk rock, and pop-influenced material in favor of basic primitive rock and roll.

The packaging contains well-researched liner notes written by Chris Bishop of Garage Hangover.com which convey basic information about each song and group, such as origin, recording date, and biographical sketches, as well as photographs of the bands. The cover artwork features a highly satirical cartoon diorama by Olaf Jens wrapping around the front and back sides of the sleeve depicting the usual revivified zombies whose methods of punishment seem reminiscent of antiquated practices used at medieval inquisitions and heresy trials, and whom on this occasion have taken upon themselves to employ the use of a sheaved hatchet-man in hooded garb to exact earthly penalties for what they consider to be the mortal sin of straying the slightest inch from their well-stated doctrine of rock & roll purity, which in their mind, indicts most forms of rock that follow 1960s garage, such as glitter rock, alternative, and heavy metal, and they have lined up a crew of condemned personages beginning with Ziggy Stardust, displayed on the front cover, whose neck has been placed upon the chopping-block, followed by others awaiting their fate, such as Slash of Guns N' Roses fame, who are depicted on the backside of the wraparound mural.

The album begins with the pulsating "Wild Angel," by James Bond & The Agents. The highly suggestive "69" by the Four, from Brownville, Tennessee is set to a crunching Kink's style guitar riff and was recorded at Sam Phillips' Sun Studio in Memphis. The highly fuzzed-drenched "Return to Innocence" is by the Expressions, from Ringgold Georgia, and previously appeared on the Destination Frantic Volume Three compilation, put out by Zone 66 Records. The Hotbeats from Bristol, Rhode Island express a flair for the oft-maintained male "one-track-mind" attitude in "Listen." "Young Miss Larsen" is by the Color and works up to a fast-paced rave-up. The set closes with GMC and the Arcelles humorous send up of the Sonics' "The Witch."

== Track listing ==
=== Side one ===
1. James Bond and the Agents: "Wild Angel"
2. John English III and the Heathens: "I Need You Near"
3. The Four: "69"
4. The Expressions: "Return to Innocence"
5. The Orphans: "Without You"
6. The Sires: "Don't Look Now"
7. It's Them/TTHHEMM: "Baby (I Still Want Your Lovin')"

=== Side two ===
1. The Orphans: "Hey Gyp"
2. Nobodys Children: "Mother's Tin Moustache"
3. South' Soul: "Lost"
4. The Hotbeats: "Listen"
5. The Hard Times: "Mr. Rolling Stone"
6. Four More: "Problem Child"
7. The Color: "Young Miss Larsen"
8. GMC and the Arcelles: "The Witch"

== Catalogue and release information ==
- LP: 15 tracks (CRYPT-115, 2015)
- CD: 30 tracks, as part of the Back from the Grave, Volume 9 CD (CRYPT 114, 2015)
