= Back from the Grave, Volume 8 =

- LP edition cover

Compilation album
- Released: January 1996 (Germany); August 23, 1996 (U.S.)
- Recorded: 1960s
- Genres: Garage rock; protopunk
- Label: Crypt

chronology
Back from the Grave, Volume 7 (1988)	Back from the Grave, Volume 8 (1996)	Back from the Grave, Volume 9 (2015)

CD edition

Back from the Grave, Volume 8 is the eighth installment in the Back from the Grave series of garage rock compilations assembled by Tim Warren of Crypt Records. It was originally released as a double LP and CD in January 1996 in Germany and on August 26, 1996 in the U.S.

The CD version of the album, released at the same time, has a similar running order of tracks to the double LP, but with several bonus cuts added. However, in 2011 the LP edition, already double-length, was re-released and expanded to contain 36 tracks, now including all of the bonus tracks available on the CD version, as well as three newly added tracks which have not appeared on any CD version.

In keeping with all of the entries in the series, and as indicated in the subheading which reads "36 Cuts of Utter Snarling Mid-60's Garage Punk," this collection consists of many songs which display the rawer and more aggressive side of the genre and are often characterized by the use of fuzztone-distorted guitars and rough vocals. Accordingly, the set generally excludes psychedelic, folk rock, and pop-influenced material in favor of basic primitive rock and roll. The packaging features well-researched liner notes written by Tim Warren which convey basic information about each song and group, such as origin, recording date, and biographical sketches, usually written in a conversational style that includes occasional slang, anecdotes, humorous asides. The liner notes are noticeably opinionated, sometimes engaging in tongue-in-cheek insults directed at other genres of music. The packaging also includes photographs of the bands, and the front cover features a highly satirical cartoon by Mort Todd depicting revivified "rock and roll" zombies who, on this occasion, target none of their customary victims (aside from an occasional prong from their devils' pitchforks), but instead have turned up at the "mosh pit" at a 1990s "Lolabigloozzaz" festival, delightfully holding up "mosh pit cookbooks" (i.e. suggesting that the sixties garage bands were the precursors of all this), while hordes of Prozac-dependent "rejects" slam dance in the mud-drenched melee below.

The set begins with the bongo-punctuated revved-up drive of "Alright," by the Groop, from Ohio, which was recorded at A&T Studios in Toledo, which is followed by "Can't Tame Me," by the Benders from Michigan. Adrian Lloyd then delivers a screaming vocal in, "Lorna." The Chancellors from Potsdam, New York sing sarcastically about traveling around the country in "On Tour." The Bojax, from Greenville, South Carolina released a single in 1967 on Panther records, "Go Ahead and Go," which is included here and was produced by Rudy Wyatt of fellow Greenville band, the Wyld, who perform the next cut, "Goin' Places." The Painted Ship, from Vancouver, Canada, appear on two tracks, "She Said Yes" and then, later in the set, "Little White Lies." The Merlin Tree from Austin, Texas also provide two songs: first the guitar-overdriven protopunk of "Look in Your Mirror," the later "How to Win Friends." "I Don't Want to Try It Again" was the debut single by the Dagenites, from Oxon Hill, Maryland, who shared the same manager with Link Wray. The Dry Grins from Lafayette, Louisiana sing the organ-infused "She's a Drag." Satyn's Children close the set with "Don't Go."

== Track listing (2011 edition) ==
=== Side one ===
1. The Groop: "Alright!" 2:42
2. The Benders: "Can't Tame Me" 1:57
3. Adrian Lloyd: "Lorna" 2:26
4. Nightriders: "With Friends Like You, Who Needs Friends" 2:11
5. The Chancellors: "On Tour" 2:46
6. The Pseudos: "A Long Way to Nowhere" 2:26
7. The Bojax: "Go Ahead and Go" 2:00
8. The Wyld: "Goin' Places" 2:37
9. Elite U.F.O.: "Now Who's Good Enough" 2:32

=== Side two ===
1. The Painted Ship: "And She Said Yes" 2:35
2. The Merlynn Tree: "Look in Your Mirror" 2:30
3. Dave Myers and the Disciples: "C'mon Love" 1:53
4. Pulsating Heartbeats: "Talkin' About You" 2:52
5. The Cindells: "Don't Bring Me Down" 2:00
6. James T. and the Workers: "That Is All" 2:26
7. The Outspoken Blues: "Not Right Now" 2:52
8. The Painted Ship: "I Told Those Little White Lies" 2:36
9. The Piece Kor: "All I Want Is My Baby Back" 2:55

=== Side three ===
1. The Cavedwellers: "Run Around" 2:05
2. The Village Outcast: "The Girl I Used to Love" 2:01
3. The New Fugitives: "That's Queer" 2:39
4. The Dave Starky Five: "Hey Everybody" 1:56
5. The Ascendors: "I Won't Be Home" 2:17
6. The Tikis: "We're on the Move" 2:09
7. The Amberjacks: "Hey Eriq!" 2:19
8. The Ravenz: "Just Like I Want Her"
9. The Night Crawlers: "Want Me" 2:32

=== Side four ===
1. The Dagenites "I Don't Want to Try It Again" 2:27
2. The Dark Horsemen: "You Lied" 1:44
3. The Dogs: "Don't Try to Help Me" 1:57
4. The Dry Grins: "She's a Drag" 2:05
5. New Fugitives: "She's My Baby" 2:43
6. The Merlynn Tree: "How to Win Friends" 2:30
7. The Just Too Much: "She Gives Me Time" 2:25
8. Sonics Inc: "Diddy Wah Diddy" 3:12
9. Satyn's Children: "Don't Go" 2:54

== Catalogue and release information ==
- Compact disc (Crypt LP 062, rel. 1996)

== CD Track listing ==
1. The Groop: "Alright!" 2:42
2. The Benders: "Can't Tame Me" 1:57
3. Adrian Lloyd: "Lorna" 2:26
4. Nightriders: "With Friends Like You, Who Needs Friends" 2:11
5. The Chancellors: "On Tour" 2:46
6. The Pseudos: "A Long Way to Nowhere" 2:26
7. The Bojax: "Go Ahead and Go" 2:00
8. The Wyld: "Goin' Places" 2:37
9. Elite U.F.O.: "Now Who's Good Enough" 2:32
10. The Painted Ship: "And She Said Yes" 2:35
11. The Merlynn Tree: "Look in Your Mirror" 2:30
12. Dave Myers and the Disciples: "C'mon Love" 1:53
13. Pulsating Heartbeats: "Talkin' About You" 2:52
14. The Cindells: "Don't Bring Me Down" 2:00
15. James T. and the Workers: "That Is All" 2:26
16. The Outspoken Blues: "Not Right Now" 2:52
17. The Painted Ship: "I Told Those Little White Lies" 2:36
18. The Piece Kor: "All I Want Is My Baby Back" 2:55
19. Cavedwellers: "Run Around" 2:05
20. The Village Outcast: "The Girl I Used to Love" 2:01
21. The New Fugitives: "That's Queer" 2:39
22. The Dave Starky Five: "Hey Everybody" 1:56
23. The Tikis: "We're on the Move" 2:09
24. The Amberjacks: "Hey Eriq!" 2:19
25. The Night Crawlers: "Want Me" 2:32
26. The Dagenites "I Don't Want to Try It Again" 2:27
27. The Dogs: "Don't Try to Help Me" 1:57
28. The Dry Grins: "She's a Drag" 2:05
29. New Fugitives: "She's My Baby" 2:43
30. The Merlynn Tree: "How to Win Friends" 2:30
31. The Just Too Much: "She Gives Me Time" 2:25
32. Satyn's Children: "Don't Go" 2:54
