= The Guilloteens =

American garage rock band

Background information
- Origin: Memphis, Tennessee, United States
- Genres: Garage rock; pop rock
- Years active: 1964 - 1967
- Labels: Hanna-Barbera; Columbia
- Past members: Laddie Hutcherson: Joe Davis; Louis Paul; Buddy Delaney

The Guilloteens were an American garage rock band formed in Memphis, Tennessee in 1964. Much of the band's musical stance was distinguished for incorporating their homegrown Memphis influences with a hard-edged sound. Among the group's singles, the Guilloteens are most-known for their regional hit "I Don't Believe" and "Hey You". Although national success eluded the group, they are now considered one of the more accomplished garage rock acts to emerge from the era.

== History ==
Laddie Hutcherson (lead vocals, lead guitar), an ex-member of local Memphis group the LeSabres, formed the Guilloteens with Joe "Joe Jett" Davis (drums) and Louis Paul (bass guitar, backing vocals) in 1964. The trio originally encountered one another as members of the touring version of the studio R&B session band the Mar-Keys This group who produced the number three Billboard Hot 100 hit "Last Night". When the horn section and backup singers failed to appear for a gig, the three performed on their own, with the upbeat reception leading to them forming the Guilloteens. Reflecting on the formation of the band, Hutcherson recalls "We let our hair grow long and we started wearing English-looking clothes. We chose a name that sounded European since we were trying to cash-in on the Beatles". The Guiloteens subsequently earned a role as a house band for a popular Memphis teen dance club the Roaring Sixties, where they developed a sizable following among the area's pop audience.

Noticing the band's growing popularity, Jerry Williams, who managed fellow garage rock act Paul Revere and the Raiders, assumed the role of the Guilloteens' manager, and relocated the group to Los Angeles, presenting them on the television program Shindig!. In addition to Shindig!, the Guilloteens also made multiple performances on American Bandstand, Hullabaloo and Where the Action Is. The band's appearances on the shows made a fan out of Elvis Presley, convincing the singer to negotiate a spot for the Guilloteens at the Red Velvet nightclub in early 1965. While opening for the Byrds and the Turtles, the band also shared the stage with the Righteous Brothers, who helped the Guilloteens rehearse and polish some of their first compositions, including the Paul-original "I Don't Believe".

Record producer Phil Spector was impressed by the band's performances, and offered to record "I Don't Believe", coupled with the Hutcherson-penned "Hey You". Music historian Richie Unterberger, writing for the Allmusic website, says that the songs exemplified that the Guilloteens "were more versatile than the usual such act, putting fair quotients of blue-eyed soul, pop, and folk-rock into their sound, as well as the more expected British Invasion and raucous frat rock ingredients". For reasons that are obscured, when Spector flew to New York Williams signed the band to a recording contract with Hanna-Barbera Records. When "I Don't Believe" was released on the record label in 1966, it suffered from poor exposure, but still managed to become a Top 10 hit in Memphis. An additional single "For My Own" was also composed in the same folk rock-meets-blue-eyed soul vein; however, also like its predecessor, it was spurred by poor advertising. Following the lackluster sophomore release, Paul, frustrated with managerial decisions, departed the band and was replaced by Buddy Delaney.

A third single "Crying All Over My Precious Time" followed in late-1966 as the Guilloteens returned to Memphis. It proved to be the band's last release with the Hanna-Barbera label, after a successful tour with Paul Revere and the Raiders earned them a contract with Columbia Records. Their first single with Columbia, "Wild Child", emits a striking similarity to Paul Revere and the Raiders, and perhaps was the Guilloteens' grittiest recording of their musical career. Nonetheless, the single failed to garner much national attention, with a disappointing pop follow-up resulting in the group disbanding in 1967. Delaney made a rare single called "Girl" as frontman for the psychedelic pop band Buddy Delaney and the Candy Soupe shortly thereafter.

Since their disbandment, the Guilloteens' music has been spread out on several compilation albums. Most notably, "Wild Child" appears on Mind Blowers, Volume 1, "Crying All Over My Precious Time" on Highs in the Mid-Sixties, Volume 8, and "For My Own" on Where the Action Is! Los Angeles Nuggets 1965-1968. In 2003, the band's complete discography, including Delaney's one single with the Candy Shoppe, was released on For My Own: The Complete Singles Collection LP on Misty Lane Records in 2003.
