= The Gentlemen (Dallas band) =

American garage rock band

Background information
- Origin: Dallas, Texas, United States
- Genres: Garage rock; rock and roll; protopunk
- Years active: 1964–1968
- Label: Vandan
- Past members: Seab Meador - 4 yrs.; Mike Kelley - 4 yrs.; Bruce Bland - 3 yrs.; Tommy Turner - 3 yrs.; Tim Justice - 4 yrs.; Jimmie Randall - 6 mos.; Lonnie Taylor - 1 yr.; Danny Sanches - 2 yrs.; Jimmie Vaughan - 4 mos.

The Gentlemen were an American garage rock band from Dallas, Texas, who were active from 1964 to 1968. They are best known for their 1966 song, "It's a Cry'n Shame", which has been recognized as one of the greatest songs in garage rock. The band is noted for the contributions of guitarist and songwriter, Seab Meador. Jimmie Vaughan, later a member the Fabulous Thunderbirds and brother of Double Trouble guitarist Stevie Ray Vaughan, served a brief stint for several months in the Gentlemen in late 1965 and early 1966, but did not appear on any of their recordings. He went on to play in another Dallas garage rock band, the Chessmen.

== History ==
=== Origins ===
The Gentlemen formed in 1964 and were from Oak Cliff, a section of Dallas, Texas. The band went through several lineup changes, but the band's musical direction was largely guided by guitarist Seab Meador, who spent several years in the band and was recognized by those around him as a genius on his instrument. Meador's tastes gravitated towards bands such as the Rolling Stones, the Animals, the Kinks, and the Yardbirds, whose lead guitarist, Jeff Beck greatly influenced his playing. Consequently, the band's sound owed more to the blues-based approach of the Rolling Stones and the Animals than the pop ballads of the Beatles and Dave Clark Five. The band's original bass player, Jimmy Randall announced his departure and went on to play with L.A.-based Jo Jo Gunne. Lonnie Taylor came in, and eventually succeeded him, but for a transitional period the band had two bass players.

In 1965 the band went to Sumet Recording studio and recorded an unreleased actuate of two songs, "Beg, Borrow of Steal" and "Here I Cannot Stay". According to former drummer Tim Justice, "Jimmie also remembers something that I didn't, that he played bass on our first and earliest recordings, 'Beg Borrow and Steal', and 'Here I Cannot Stay', both written by Seab Meador. Boy, were we young. Must have been 15 at the time. In the session, Seab was on guitar and singing, I was drumming, Jimmie Randall was on bass and Mike Kelly was on guitar. The later three sang backup." The Gentlemen also cut a demo acetate of the song "It's a Cry'n Shame", which would be re-recorded the following year for official release. They also made an appearance on Channel 11 (KTVT) playing at the popular teen nightspot, the Panther Club in Fort Worth. This unit (with and without Jimmy Randall) played throughout 1965. Towards the end of the year fellow Oak Cliff musician Jimmie Vaughan, later of the Fabulous Thunderbirds, did a several month stint with the group and later played for another garage rock band, the Chessmen. Meador and Vaughan forged a solid friendship during this time."

=== Peak of popularity ===
In early 1966, the nucleus of the definitive lineup was established, which included Seab Meador on lead guitar and vocals, Mike Kelley on guitar and vocals, Tim Justice on drums, as well as new members Bruce Bland on bass and Tommy Turner on keyboards. This incarnation solidified into a driving rock band that was a popular live act. They played venues such as Louann's Club and The Studio Club in Dallas and Panther A'Go-Go and The Box in Ft. Worth. Later that year, The Gentlemen opened for James Brown at the Dallas Convention Center. A family friend of Mike Kelly was involved with the bookings there, and said he was looking for a band to open and play four or five songs. We were offered $500 and eagerly accepted. According to Tim Justice:

We dropped off our equipment at the loading dock and made our way down a corridor where we met Mike's contact. He instructed us to set up behind the stage curtains and be ready to begin in short time. This was probably the largest venue we ever played, so our hearts were pretty much racing like rabbits. We could hear the crowd get louder as show time approached. Suddenly, someone shouted "Five minutes" and we got ready to rock... Then, the curtains glided back, someone else said, "Please welcome, The Gentlemen,” the lights went up on stage, and five white kids from Oak Cliff were confronted with a completely black audience; I mean...no white people! ...Dallas was very segregated at the time. Despite this mismatch, 'Nervous Breakdown' was going along pretty famously, and finally one older black gentleman stood up on the front row and started to dance. Then someone else did, then more and finally the race barrier was toppled by something so universal that nothing could stop it: good old rock and roll. We finished up, got a fairly warm round of applause...

The Gentlemen also opened for Mitch Ryder and The Detroit Wheels and The Beau Brummels at Louann's in 1966. We learned The Beatles' "Paperback Writer" for that show. We also played alongside Jerry Lee Lewis and Roy Orbison at Panther A'Go-Go. Tom Brown, president of Vandan Records heard the Gentlemen play at LouAnn's Club in Dallas, and wondered if the band could do some writing with him and Gene Garretson, his arranger. After several weeks, the band came up with two songs, "You Can't Be True", a ballad and the hard-rocking fuzz-drenched "It's a Cry'n Shame". The gentler "You Can't Be True", was chosen to be the A-side and a considerable amount of time and expense was lavished on it. Whereas "It's a Cry'n Shame" was recorded quickly, with Mike Kelley on vocals, only requiring a couple of takes. According to Justice:

We liked "Cry'n Shame" better, but Gene spent a lot of time arranging violins and multiple tracks for 'You Can't Be True' so that was the track they pushed. It took us nearly two weeks to record 'You Can't Be True', and as a complete after-thought, 2 takes and probably 1 hour to slam down 'It's a Cry'n Shame'. Therein lies the genuine spontaneity that makes it pure straight ahead punk rock, I suppose. ...Seab Meador had a gaping hole in the center of his Vox Super Beatle so that he could stick his guitar neck inside to get the Fuzz tone that is prevalent on "Cry'n Shame."

Tom Brown had two thousand copies pressed and sent them to several deejays he knew in places such as Detroit, Philadelphia, and Boston. A few weeks later Brown showed the band members a copy of the January 1967 edition of Record World Magazine, which included the B-side song "It's a Cry'n Shame" alongside "Somebody to Love" by Jefferson Airplane, in its Four-Star Rating column of hits to watch. The song received airplay on KLIF and KNOK radio stations in Dallas, upping the band's local profile considerably. The Gentlemen played a "go-go" show on the bill with several other bands at a large auditorium in south Dallas. The promoters had to provide police protection for the band, who were greeted by a queue of screaming girls begging for autographs. According to Justice: "...we were very happy, as this was about as close to "That 60's British Rock Star Magic" as a bunch of 16-year old kids from Dallas would ever get."

=== Breakup and later developments ===
However, the expense pressing all of the records, as well as recording the intended A-side left Vandan Records owner Tom Brown out of money. According to Justice: "Shortly after he showed up with the magazine, we showed up at his home to find a for sale sign and no furniture. We would find out later that he was down to his last cash and skipped town to avoid creditors. We never saw him again, but read that he moved to Los Angeles to start over. He died there not long after." In 1967, Seab Meador left The Gentlemen, and later did stints with other Dallas bands such as the Bridge. Danny Sanchez, later with the Roy Head's band, replaced Meador on lead guitar, but the group lost momentum after Seab's departure. The Gentlemen disbanded in early 1968.

Seab Meador and the Gentlemen's original bass player Jimmie Randal went on to form bands such as the Hurricanes, a Houston-based band, and later the Werewolves in the late 1970s, were managed and produced by former Rolling Stones Svengali, Andrew Loog Oldham, who cut two albums for RCA records. On January 24, 1980, Seab Meador died of a brain tumour. According to Randall: "Seab was a great friend I was at the hospital the night before he died. He taught me a lot. I miss him still."

=== Legacy ===
The Gentlemen are primarily remembered for their song "It's a Cry'n Shame," which is often mentioned as one of the greatest songs in garage rock. It has been referred to by the G45 Legends listings as "One of the top 10 tracks to play to anyone you need to convert to '60s-garageism." In Mike Markesich's Teenbeat Mayhem, based on the balloting of a panel of noted writers and garage rock experts, the song is rated as a ten out of ten, and in the section listing the 1000 greatest garage rock recordings, is ranked #2, second only to the 13th Floor Elevators' "You're Gonna Miss Me". "It's a Cry'n Shame" has appeared on several compilations such as Pebbles, Volume 5, Essential Pebbles, Volume 1, and Fort Worth Teen Scene Volume 3 and has been played The demo acetate version has been released on the Back from the Grave, Volume 9 compilation. The Song has been featured on Little Steven's Underground Garage and on Sirius Satellite Radio and on Bill Kelly's Black Hole of Rock and Roll on New York's WFMU.

== Membership (circa. 1966–1967) ==
- Seab Meador (guitar, vocals)
- Mike Kelley (guitar, vocals)
- Bruce Bland (bass)
- Tommy Turner (keyboards)
- Tim Justice (drums)

== Discography ==
- "Beg, Borrow, or Steal" b/w "Here I Cannot Say" (Sumet Recording Studio acetate, rec. 1965)
- "You Can't Be True" b/w "It's a Cry'n Shame" (Vandan 8304/3, rel. 1966)
