= Back from the Grave, Volume 9 =

Compilation album
- Released: 2015
- Recorded: 1960s
- Genres: Garage rock; protopunk
- Label: Crypt

chronology
Back from the Grave, Volume 8 (1996)	Back from the Grave, Volume 9 (2015)	Back from the Grave, Volume 10 (2015)

CD edition
- Back from the Grave, Volume 9, 30 tracks

Back from the Grave, Volume 9, released on LP and CD in 2015, is the ninth installment in the Back from the Grave series of garage rock compilations. Like all the entries in the series it was assembled by Tim Warren of Crypt Records. As indicated in the subheading which reads "Raw Blastin' Mid 60s Punk," this collection consists of many songs which display the rawer and more aggressive side of the genre and are often characterized by the use of fuzztone-distorted guitars and rough vocals. In typical fashion, the set generally excludes psychedelic, folk rock, and pop-influenced material in favor of basic primitive rock and roll.

The packaging contains liner notes written by Chris Bishop of Garage Hangover.com which convey basic information about each song and group, such as origin, recording date, and biographical sketches, as well as photographs of the bands. The album cover artwork features a satirical cartoon by Olaf Jens depicting noticeably gleeful revivified zombies who, on this occasion, have returned from "rock and roll heaven" on "retro" flying saucers and are targeting their customary victims: followers of supposedly "heretical" genres of music which have come to prominence over the years, which in this case include heavy metal, hardcore punk (insinuating that it is not true punk), rap, and modern pop-country—all done with a noticeable disdain for iPhones, music downloads, and other popular specimens of current technology and fashion (for example, "exposed undies"), but are presented as "minor figures" in Jens' Sistine Chapel-like diorama depicting a global TNT-blasted apocalypse initiated as a result of the zombies' cleansing in their quest to permanently re-establish the reign of "true" rock & roll.

The album begins with the driving protopunk of "Circuit Breaker," by the Pastels, from Pasco, Washington. The High Spirits from Saint Louis Park, Minnesota, follow with a version of the Zombies' "It's Alright With Me," which at midpoint shifts from a slow tempo accelerating in cadence, then rising to an organ-drenched climax consummated by a bee-sting guitar solo accompanied by cathartic screams. The Emeralds from Greenwood, Indiana are featured on the gritty blues-based "Like Father Like Son," which recounts a woeful tale partially based on A Tale of Two Cities, by Victorian novelist Charles Dickens, in which the character Jerry Cruncher is a porter by day and a grave robber at night, whose lyrics snidely remark: "...my son goes to the church where they wear the black capes where you're taught not to have your fun..." Also included is the 1965 demo acetate version of "It's a Cry'n Shame" by The Gentlemen, from Dallas, Texas. Knoll Allen And The Noble Savages are heard on the highly primitive sexually charged "Animal." "No Room For Your Love," by the Starfyres, closes out the set.

The CD additionally contains all tracks of the Volume 10 LP. It is enclosed in a Digipak which features a wraparound of the same cartoon by Olaf Jens that appears on the LP. In the foldout of one of two the booklets enclosed is another satirical cartoon by Olaf Jens taken from the front cover of the Volume 10 LP. Each booklet's information corresponds to the tracks on one of the LPs, the first for Volume 9 and the second for Volume 10.

== Track listing ==
=== Side one ===
1. The Pastels: "Circuit Breaker"
2. The High Spirits: "It's Alright with Me"
3. The Warlocks: "Beware"
4. The Emeralds: "Like Father Like Son"
5. The Why-Nots: "Tamborine"
6. The Turncoats: "Something Better"
7. The Classics: "I'm Hurtin'"

=== Side two ===
1. The Raevins: "The Edge of Time"
2. Lord Charles & The Prophets: "Don't Ask Me no Questions"
3. The Gentlemen, "It's a Cry'n Shame"
4. The Shakles: "Whizz #7"
5. Unknown Artist: "When I Feel Better"
6. Knoll Allen and the Noble Savages: "Animal"
7. The Donshires: "Sad and Blue"
8. The Starfyres: "No Room for Your Love"

== Catalogue and release information ==
- LP: 15 tracks (CRYPT 114, 2015)
- CD: 30 tracks – contains all tracks of Volume 10 LP (CRYPT 114, 2015)
