= The Rugbys =

The Rugbys are a rock band from Louisville, Kentucky, best known for their U.S. Top 40 hit "You, I".

== History ==
The band was formed in 1965 in Louisville, doing mostly covers. But as competition among Louisville groups to write and record original music increased, the Rugbys recorded and released two singles in 1968, "Walking the Streets Tonight", written by Doug Sahm of the Sir Douglas Quintet, later included on the compilation album Highs in the Mid-Sixties, Volume 8, and "Stay with Me", written by Steve McNicol. Both songs were released locally and played on Louisville radio stations WAKY and WKLO.

The band found success later in 1968, when they decided to release the B-side of "Stay with Me", a song called "You, I", also written by McNicol. "You, I" climbed to #1 on both local radio stations. They were then signed to Shelby Singleton's Nashville, Tennessee, record label, Amazon Records, which re-released the single "You, I" in 1969, and the song became a national hit, climbing to #24 on the Billboard Hot 100, #22 on the Cash Box magazine charts and #18 on the Record World charts. "You, I" was also released worldwide on labels from Spain (Exit Records), Italy (Akarma Records), England (Polydor Records) and Thailand (Thai Records). Akarma also released the album "Hot Cargo" on CD in a limited edition, which is very rare and hard to find on the Internet. "You, I" was also covered by a couple of other international groups (The Pepper Smelter Group, from Peru, and the Climax, from Belgium).

The latter part of 1969 and all of 1970 were spent touring the midwest and northeast, playing on the same bill with artists like Bob Seger, Grand Funk Railroad, the James Gang, and many others. Later in 1969, the band released their only album, Hot Cargo, which received only mild success due to a complete lack of national promotion and a failure by Shelby Singleton in 1969–70 to recognize the upsurge of FM radio. "Wendegahl the Warlock" was the follow-up single to "You, I", but was not as successful, charting at #122 on the Cash Box charts and #84 on Record World. Hot Cargo would later be released on CD along with an album by a group named Lazarus on the same disc, called The Rugbys meet Lazarus. More recently, in 2007, Gear Fab Records released an anthology album with McNicol and the Rugbys' previously unreleased original material called The Lost Sessions.

== Members ==
- Chris Hubbs (guitar)
- Steve McNicol (guitar)
- Mike Hoerni (bass guitar)
- Eddy Vernon (keyboards)
- Glen Howerton (drums)
