= The Bojax =

American garage rock band

Background information
- Origin: Greenville, South Carolina, United States
- Genres: Garage rock; protopunk
- Years active: 1964-1969
- Label: Panther
- Past members: Bobby Holliday; Edwin Bayne; Mack Sanders; Lyn Cook; Philip Maynard; Cecil Wyche; Carol Cox; Jim Summey; Roy Woods; Van Stout

The Bojax, later known as William Goat, were an American garage rock band from Greenville, South Carolina, who were active from 1964 through 1971. They are best known for the hard-driving protopunk sound exemplified in songs such as "Go Ahead and Go" and "Hippie Times". Although they briefly enjoyed popularity in their own region, they did not gain wider recognition until a number of years later when their material would be re-issued on various compilations and anthologies.

== History ==
=== Origins ===
The Bojax formed in Greenville, South Carolina in 1964 and were initially known as the Knights. The original lineup consisted of students from Berea High (and Junior High) in Greenville. According to vocalist and guitarist Bobby Holliday, who was then fourteen years old, watching the Beatles' February 9 appearance on the Ed Sullivan Show convinced him to co-found this, his first group, with drummer Lyn Cook, who was the same age. They soon added Mack Sanders, who was only twelve, on bass and Roy Wood on lead guitar, and recruited Edwin Bayne, who was older (sixteen) and playing with a more established band in the area called the Shags, leaving them to join the Knights on lead and rhythm guitar. According to Holliday, the Shags were instrumental in helping the Knights learn songs and land gigs. Typically the band rehearsed in a building with a large room located behind Baynes' family house, which according to Holliday, gave the band the feeling of being on stage. At other times they would play in the living rooms of other band members' houses. Their first live show was played at Union Bleachery Gymnasium in Greenville. Each of the members was paid six dollars and the band was given a case of Pepsi after the show. They played at high school dances, teen clubs, and, in spite of their young age, nightspots, which Holliday notes "...always seemed to look the other way regarding our being underage..." The band often played at Club Jamarta, which was owned by James Posey, who Holliday has indicated was "a great friend to musicians." Club Jamarta featured all of the top bands in the area such as the Wyld, the Tombstones, Moses Dillard & the Dynamic Showmen, the Nomads, the Shaggs, the Knights of the Road, the Tangents, The Six Pac Band, and the Rants, who later became the Toy Factory, and eventually the Marshall Tucker Band. The band developed a hard-driving sound which Holliday describes as energetic and "reckless," which was influenced by British Invasion acts such as the Animals, Manfred Mann, and the Rolling Stones, as well as blues. Holliday also has mentioned Bob Dylan as an influence on the group.

Eventually the group changed their name, partially in response to the abundance of other bands employing the moniker, "Knights", opting instead for something less ubiquitous: the Bojax. The new name was inspired by the picture on the box of a Big Daddy Roth model car kit. According to Holliday: Mack had a model car set by "Big Daddy". The photo on the box had a garage in the background named "Bojax Garage". We liked the sound of the word, and we wanted to choose a name that no one else would use...so, I guess you could say we truly are a 'garage band.'" The band went through several shifting lineups, with Holliday and Bayne temporarily leaving the band to join the Traveliers, a more established group in the area, who had a manager, Soupy Hendricks. They were replaced by Stanley Ward on vocals and rhythm guitar, who was introduced to them by his sister when they were playing a show at the Golden Strip Teen Canteen, and Jimmy Summey on bass. Other members who would contribute to the lineup at different stages were Cecil Wyche and Carol Cox on keyboards, Van Stout on bass, and Philip Maynard on guitar. According to Holliday, one of the challenges in keeping a steady lineup was the young age of some of the members whose parents objected to their children playing in rowdy nightspots. They were one of several bands in the Greenville area that shared members interchangeably. Holliday, in addition to his work in the Bojax, also provided the lead vocal on a cut, "Know A Lot About Love," by another local band, the Wyld. Guitarist Stanley Ward also played for The Tombstones, another Greenville combo. Holliday and Bayne would eventually return.

The Bojax was not under consistent and steady management, however Soupy Hendricks managed the band for a certain amount of time and landed them a gig with the Hollies and Herman's Hermits. According to Holliday: "The crowd response was a bit overwhelming, and they were rushing our dressing room just like they were for the Hollies and Herman's Hermits. We gave our Bojax card to some of the fans in the crowd, and they mailed us the photos they had taken that night. It gave us great memories, and a brief glimpse of life on the other side." However, their arrangement with Hendricks did not last long. Holliday has indicated that the reason for the parting of ways was due to Hendricks' insistence that the band become a seven-piece unit with horns, something the band refused to do.

=== Recording ===
The Bojax did not release a record until 1967, "Go Ahead and Go" b/w "Hippie Times." Rudy Wyatt of The Wyld produced the record, which was recorded in a minimum of takes with no overdubs, at the Mark V studios in Greenville, and appeared on the Panther label, run by Will Hammond, who was also a musician. Hammond was introduced to the band by Wyatt. According to Holliday, "We were great friends, and still are. I think we first met Rudy through his friendship with The Shags. They were all a couple of years older than us...he wanted to create that large auditorium type, live sound for Hippie Times. He even had a couple of other drummers (Robin Miller from The Wyld, and Preston Elrod from The Traveliers) come in to stomp their feet on a large platform while clapping their hands." Holliday has indicated that his previous work as a vocalist on the Wyld's song, "Know A Lot About Love", served as an impetus for the Bojax to pursue recording, a step which according to Holliday "...changed us from being "just another club band" into being "recording artists." Their first single received a lot of airplay on radio stations in the Greenville area. According to Holliday: "Hippie Times, charted for a few weeks in the 30s. The second and third singles made it to the Top 10, and received good airplay for a couple of months each. By the second and third single we were getting airplay not only in our local area, but in Charlotte, North Carolina, Myrtle Beach, South Carolina, and Atlanta, Georgia." "Go Ahead and Go" displays elements of the band's Dylan influence.

Their next single, "Fast Life", was also recorded at Mark V and released on Panther. Rudy Wyatt was more involved on this record, not only producing, but also songwriting and contributing the lead guitar part, as well as singing background vocals. Two drummers played on the track which was intentionally done in a high key to stretch the top of Holliday's vocal register, to achieve a Steve Winwood-like effect. Wyatt instructed the engineer to record the song in "the red", overloading each channel to get a distorted effect. "Don't Look Back", the flipside, was recorded without overdubs in a small two-track studio in Travelers Rest, South Carolina, with engineer Don Dudley. By the time of the session, Jimmy Summey had replaced Mack on bass, and Cecil Wyche was added on organ. The Bojax's subsequent single, "I've Enjoyed As Much Of You As I Can Stand" and "So Glad", was recorded in Atlanta, Georgia at LeFevres Studio, with the lineup including Bobby Holliday on vocals, Edwin Bayne on guitar, Jim Summey on bass, Cecil Wyche on keyboards, and Lyn Cook on drums. Will Hammond and his musical partner, Jim Stafford (Hammond and Stafford were playing as a duo in Atlanta) wrote and produced both songs, which were the first that the Bojax recorded using overdubs. Jim Stafford overdubbed the lead guitar parts on both tunes. Their version of the Remains "Don't Look Back" became a local hit in 1968.

Edwin Bayne joined the Marines to avoid being drafted into the Vietnam War, however he ended up being deployed there anyway and ended up in combat. Jimmy Summey and Cecil Wyche left the Greenville area to go to college. Bobby Holliday went to a local college, primarily to continue with The Bojax. In 1969 Holliday and Lyn Cook brought in Van Stout on bass and Philip Maynard on lead guitar. However, after Bayne got wounded in Vietnam, he returned to Greenville in 1970, and the band reunited under a new name, William Goat, as a heavy rock outfit, whose lineup consisted of Bobby Holliday, Mack Sanders, Edwin Bayne, and Lyn Cook. They played together until the summer of 1971, when Rudy Wyatt asked Holliday and Cook to move to Los Angeles to pursue a record deal, signifying the end of the group.

=== Later developments ===
In a nutshell, being in The Bojax gave me the direction that I continued to follow for most of my life. With The Bojax I discovered the joy of music. The friendships that were made are still some of the best friendships I have today. With the loss of Edwin Bayne last year to cancer, I became even more aware of the importance of these friendships, and of the value of remembering those days together."

— Bobby Holliday reflecting on his experience with the Bojax

After Bobby Holliday returned from California, he and Mack Sanders played together in various configurations throughout the 1970s and 1980s. They formed a band called Tomorrow which opened for well-established acts such as Fleetwood Mac (during their Bob Welch period), Steely Dan, and ZZ Top. In the mid-1970s through early 1980s Holliday, who had long enjoyed folk music and bluegrass, performed as a solo act in coffee houses and small clubs across the Southeast. He recorded two albums, Home Grown and Another Stage, which achieved some regional success. He also played in a duo with Mack Sanders' brother, David Sanders, in the late 1970s. At this time Mack Sanders recorded an album with popular act, Anthem. In the early 1980s Holliday formed a band with the Sanders brothers called the Sanders/Holliday Band and recorded an album. They opened for Elvin Bishop in Springfield, Missouri, and traveled exhaustively for a few years. In the mid-1980s Holliday, tired of constant touring, played in as a house act in Greenville, while pursuing a songwriting career in Nashville. He opened a show for Ray Charles at a festival of 80,000 people. He retired from live performing in 1992, devoting himself full-time to songwriting and became a staff writer in Nashville with Milsap/Galbrath Publishing, a company owned by Ronnie Milsap and producer, Rob Galbrath. In the mid-1990s he left the music industry to become involved in the health and nutrition industry; however in recent years he has resumed songwriting and recording. The Bojax' work has been re-issued on various compilations since the 1990s. "Go ahead and Go" appears on both the LP and CD versions of Back from the Grave, Volume 8. "Hippie Times" is included on Wyld Sydes, Volume 8. "Fast Life" appears on Quagmire, Volume 1. In 2004 the Bojax complete recordings were released on the ten-inch EP, Don't Look Back.

== Membership ==
- Bobby Holliday (lead vocals, guitar)
- Edwin Bayne (lead and rhythm guitar)
- Mack Sanders (bass)
- Lyn Cook (drums)
- Philip Maynard (guitar)
- Cecil Wyche (keyboards)
- Carol Cox (keyboards)
- Jim Summey (bass)
- Roy Woods (guitar)
- Van Stout (bass)

== Discography ==
=== 45 r.p.m. ===
- "Go Ahead and Go" b/w "Hippie Times" (Panther 3; August, 1967)
- "Fast Life" b/w "Don't Look Back" (Panther 4; November, 1967)

=== E.P. ===
- Don't Look Back...It's The Boja 10"Mini LP (Misty Lane)
