= The Chymes =

Garage rock band

The Chymes were an all-female 1960's garage rock group that was signed to Chattahoochee Records. The group consisted of sisters Stephanie, Candice and Irisse. They were first discovered by Howard Kaylan of The Turtles. The group recorded their only songs in 1966, consisting of "He's Not There Anymore", which was released on a Chattahoochee 715 with a B side of their only other song "Quite A Reputation". They also recorded a song titled "Nobody Cares," written by Kaylan and his girlfriend Nita Garfield who helped discover The Chymes. However, no copies of the song remain.

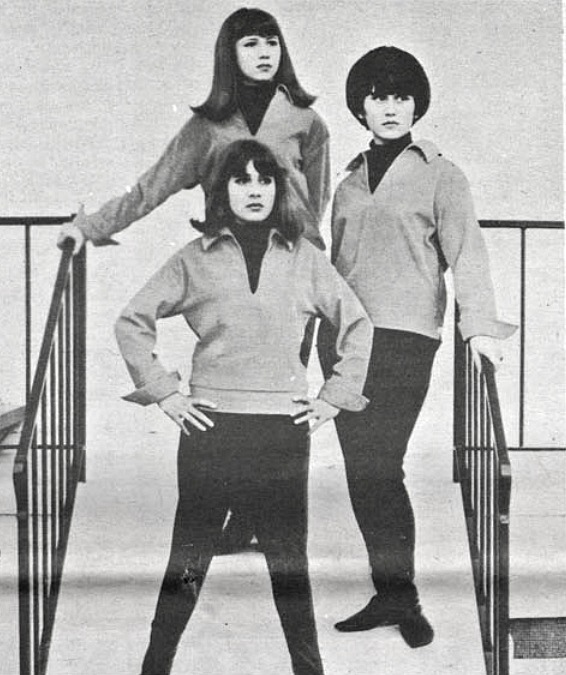
The Chymes in 1966

The girls' brief popularity won them local television appearances. Their record reached #28 on the top 40.

== Notable information ==
When the sisters first began recording, Stephanie was 16, Irisse was 15, and Candice was 13. Candice was the lead singer, Stephanie sang soprano harmony and Irisse sang alto harmony. They lived in the Los Angeles suburbs when they were discovered. The Chymes performed a live gig in Santa Barbara with another up-and-coming group known as the Sixpence, who were playing in the background and later changed their name to the Strawberry Alarm Clock. They did a lip-sync performance on a Bandstand-like show in San Diego, following the Mamas and the Papas.

Candice died on August 8, 2010, from lung cancer.
