= Fort Worth Teen Scene! =

Compilation album series

Fort Worth Teen Scene! is an extensive compilation album series centering on the burgeoning teen garage rock music scene of Fort Worth, Texas between 1964 and 1967. The series, distributed through Norton Records, helped reveal relatively unknown recordings by groups originating from Fort Worth that were previously made available to only a handful of collectors. In total, three albums were released in relation to the series in 2004.

The Fort Worth teen scene emerged from the wake of the British Invasion, with nearly all the bands from the region tended to take influence from the harder-edged R&B and blues rock music of the Rolling Stones and the Yardbirds. These two musical acts' styles were emulated throughout the series on "one-take" recordings, which also mixed in a sizable share of cover versions such as two different interpretations of "Mister, You're a Better Man Than I" and "Train Kept A-Rollin'". Typical of most garage rock musical artists of the era, Fort Worth's scene was formed by developing teenage musicians, sharing the primitive and raw sound of groups featured on the Pebbles series. For the most part, the bands were extremely popular within Fort Worth, but hardly became noticed outside the region, granted the limited national exposure of "Night of the Sadist" by Larry and the Blue Notes.

Along with the albums' liner notes, a film called Teen A-Go-Go was created by music historians Mellissa Kirkendall and Mark A. Nobles, and released to correspond with the series. It goes into detail about the music scene through the use of rare photos, archival footage, and multiple interviews with surviving members of some of the Fort Worth-based bands. Series co-creator Larry Harrison characterized the scene as "a hotbed of garage band activity with its own infrastructure. There were teen clubs, like the Box, the Candy Stick, the legendary after-hours Cellar, the Jolly Time Teen Hop, and a multitude of converted skating rinks and rec centers with “A-Go-Go” appended to their names, where kids flocked by the hundreds every weekend to cheer on their local heroes in battles of the bands".

== Discography ==
- Fort Worth Teen Scene! Volume 1 #CED 304, Norton Records (2004)
- Fort Worth Teen Scene! Volume 2 #CED 305, Norton Records (2004)
- Fort Worth Teen Scene! Volume 3 #CED 306, Norton Records (2004)
