= Highs in the Mid-Sixties series =

Series of rock music compilation albums

The Highs in the Mid-Sixties series is a group of 23 compilation albums of garage rock and psychedelic rock recordings that were issued by AIP Records in the mid-1980s. This series is a companion to the Pebbles series of similar music; the title is technically preceded by "Pebbles Presents:". The title sounds like it might have come from a weather report, although "Highs" intends to mean "the best" (and is also an apparent drug reference). The recordings on these albums were originally released in the mid-1960s.

== Nature of the music ==
The individual albums in the Pebbles series include records from throughout the US, along with a few from Canada and other countries. Additionally, the Pebbles, Volume 6 LP features British bands, while the recordings on The Continent Lashes Back sub-series within the Pebbles series are taken from continental Europe. By contrast, the recordings on the Highs in the Mid-Sixties series are strictly by American artists, and the individual albums showcase garage rock recordings by bands from particular cities, states and regions. As a result, many of the albums evidence a particular regional "sound" in the musical scene in that part of the country.

The first three albums concentrate on recordings that were released in the Los Angeles area; this is appropriate, since AIP Records is headquartered in Southern California. However, the specific years are not actually correct, since the original years of release are not limited to the year shown on any of these three albums. Further information on the nature of the music is given in the article on the Pebbles series.

== Regions represented ==
The areas that are documented in the Highs in the Mid-Sixties series cover a large portion of the nation, particularly between the Pacific Coast and the Mississippi River. However, the series is hardly comprehensive; among the notable omissions are New York, along with the rest of the Northeast, plus San Francisco (although the last album among the CDs in the Pebbles series, Pebbles, Volume 11 covers northern California). Areas that are particularly rich in excellent garage rock recordings are represented by several LPs; for example, five of the albums are devoted to Texas, which is probably the most widely anthologized state on compilation albums of this type of music. However, the only areas that are not represented on at least two of the albums are Highs in the Mid-Sixties, Volume 4 (Chicago) and Highs in the Mid-Sixties, Volume 18 (Colorado).

== Release data ==
Unlike the Pebbles series – which has been released over an extended period of time by several record labels and in a variety of formats – the 23 albums in the Highs in the Mid-Sixties series were released only as LPs and in a short time span of 1983 to 1986 (in fact, the 23rd album is the only 1986 release). This is one of the fastest series of releases among garage rock compilation albums. By way of example, the 28 LPs in the Pebbles series were released between 1978 and 1988, and the 20 LPs in the Rubble series were released between 1984 and 2002.

== Discography ==
- Highs in the Mid-Sixties, Volume 1: L.A. '65 / Teenage Rebellion; #AIP 10003
- Highs in the Mid-Sixties, Volume 2: L.A. '66 / Riot on Sunset Strip; #AIP 10004
- Highs in the Mid-Sixties, Volume 3: L.A. '67 / Mondo Hollywood; #AIP 10005
- Highs in the Mid-Sixties, Volume 4: Chicago; #AIP 10006
- Highs in the Mid-Sixties, Volume 5: Michigan; #AIP 10007
- Highs in the Mid-Sixties, Volume 6: Michigan, Part 2; #AIP 10011
- Highs in the Mid-Sixties, Volume 7: The Northwest; #AIP 10012
- Highs in the Mid-Sixties, Volume 8: The South; #AIP 10014
- Highs in the Mid-Sixties, Volume 9: Ohio; #AIP 10015
- Highs in the Mid-Sixties, Volume 10: Wisconsin; #AIP 10017
- Highs in the Mid-Sixties, Volume 11: Texas, Part 1; #AIP 10019
- Highs in the Mid-Sixties, Volume 12: Texas, Part 2; #AIP 10021
- Highs in the Mid-Sixties, Volume 13: Texas, Part 3; #AIP 10022
- Highs in the Mid-Sixties, Volume 14: The Northwest, Part 2; #AIP 10020
- Highs in the Mid-Sixties, Volume 15: Wisconsin, Part 2; #AIP 10025
- Highs in the Mid-Sixties, Volume 16: The Northwest, Part 3; #AIP 10024
- Highs in the Mid-Sixties, Volume 17: Texas, Part 4; #AIP 10026
- Highs in the Mid-Sixties, Volume 18: Colorado; #AIP 10027
- Highs in the Mid-Sixties, Volume 19: Michigan, Part 3; #AIP 10028
- Highs in the Mid-Sixties, Volume 20: L.A., Part 4; #AIP 10029
- Highs in the Mid-Sixties, Volume 21: Ohio, Part 2; #AIP 10030
- Highs in the Mid-Sixties, Volume 22: The South, Part 2; #AIP 10031
- Highs in the Mid-Sixties, Volume 23: Texas, Part 5; #AIP 10038

== See also ==
- Pebbles series
