= The Chessmen =

American garage rock band

- The Chessmen, (1966).

Background information
- Origin: Denton, Texas, United States
- Genres: Garage rock
- Years active: 1964–1968
- Labels: Bismark, B.R.S.
- Past members: Robert Patton; Ron DiIulio; Tommy Carter; Tommy Carrigan; Jimmy Kay Herbert; Ricky Marshall; Richard Dace; Johnny Peebles; Doyle Bramhall; Jimmie Vaughan

The Chessmen were an American garage rock band from Denton, Texas, near Dallas, who were active in the 1960s. They were one of the most popular bands in the region and recorded for Bismark Records, where they recorded three singles including, "I Need You There", which is now considered a garage rock classic. The band is notable for including several members who went on to greater fame. Jimmie Vaughan, brother of Stevie Ray Vaughan was briefly a member, joining after the death of original band leader, guitarist, and vocalist, Robert Patton, who died in a boating accident in 1966. Drummer Doyle Bramhall later played with and wrote songs for Stevie Ray Vaughan, and Bill Etheridge later played bass with ZZ Top. Following the breakup of the Chessmen, several of their members, including Jimmie Vaughan, went on to form a group that would come to be known as Texas Storm, which eventually included Stevie Ray Vaughan on bass.

== History ==
=== Origins ===
The Chessmen were formed in early 1964 by students at North Texas State University (now University of North Texas), in the town of Denton, approximately twenty five miles from Dallas. The original lineup included Robert Patton from Midland in West Texas on rhythm guitar and vocals, Ron DiIulio on keyboards, Tommy Carrigan on drums, Tommy Carter on bass. Carter would be the only member to remain with the band throughout their whole tenure, playing with them until their breakup in 1968. They began playing at sports events such as basketball games and football pre-game rallies. In early 1965 they signed a contract with George Rickrich, owner of the Fine Arts Theatre in Denton, who became their manager. Rickrich had them play between movie screenings. He hired a photographer to take promotional shots and began booking them for shows outside of Denton.

=== Recording ===
Rickrich immediately arranged a deal with Bismarck Records to record their first single, a version of the Drifters’ hit "Save the Last Dance for Me", backed by a female chorus. On the flip side was an atmospheric instrumental ballad, "Dreams And Wishes" composed by guitarist Robert Patton. Ron DiIulio left the Chessmen shortly thereafter, but remained at North Texas State, forming two short-lived bands, first the Rejects and then the New Sound in 1966. He later joined Noel Odom & the Group and the Bad Habits from his hometown of Shreveport, Louisiana. After keyboardist Ron DiIulio left the band in May 1965, the band auditioned several musicians to replace him, but on guitars, not keyboards during the intervening months between May and July. At this time the group received several write-ups in the Denton Record-Chronicle that on listed three guitarists appearing with them on different occasions: Jimmy Herbert (mentioned as "Jimmy Kay"), Ricky Marshall, and Richard Dace. Jim Herbert won the spot and joined the band as lead guitarist. Drummer Tom Carrigan met Jim Herbert while seeing him play various gigs around the NTSU campus, and invited Herbert to a band rehearsal at his mother's house, which was located just off the campus. The group's new lineup consisted of Herbert on guitar, Patton on guitar and vocals, Carter on bass and vocals, and Carrigan on drums.

It was with this lineup that the Chessmen recorded their best known song "I Need You There", written by Norris Green, which appeared on their next single on Bismark's B.R.S. label, backed with the acoustic guitar-embellished ballad, "Sad" written by Patton and Carter. On "I Need You There", Patton sang the lead vocal and Herbert supplied the song's signature guitar licks. The night they recorded "I Need You There", Delbert McClinton and the Ron-Dels were in the next studio recording "If You Really Want Me To I’ll Go". On stage Patton, Herbert, and Carter alternated on lead vocals for most of the band's repertoire, and the three occasionally did harmonies. The group began appearing regularly at all-ages dances at the Spinning Wheels Skating Rink on North Elm St in Denton. In October 1965, they recorded a song that was never released, "You’re No Good".

At the end of 1965 Jim Herbert left the band and became a member of the Pit Club's house band, the Pitmen and later joined Galen Jeter's Brass Blues Band. Johnny Peebles replaced Herbert on lead guitar. Drummer Tommy Carrigan also departed at this time, and was replaced by Doyle Bramhall. With this new lineup they made an appearance of the Sump’n Else TV show hosted by Ron Chapman. Their next single featured "You’re Gonna Be Lonely", on the A-side, which was written by Knox Henderson (who also co-wrote Mouse and the Traps’ "Public Execution" and "Maid of Sugar, Maid of Spice" and the Uniques "You Ain’t Tuff") and Larry Mackey. Knox Henderson also produced the session. The recording includes a twelve string guitar, a throbbing bass part by Carter. The flip side, "No More", like "I Need You There", was written by Norris Green and included a doleful harmonica, interlocking guitar lines, and harmonies. The single was released in April 1966.

=== Death of Robert Patton and entry of Jimmie Vaughan ===
The group's situation was dramatically altered by the loss of their leader Robert Patton, who in a late night incident on April 19, 1966, drowned at after falling off of a sailboat in White Rock Lake in Dallas. Patton had been sailing with fellow NTSU students in his school fraternity. Though some rumored it to be a hazing incident, one of the students on board the boat, John Hargiss maintains:

I was with Robert the night of the accident that took his life. There was no hazing. Robert had already been through pledgeship along with me and Mike McGrew. We were fully initiated brothers in Sigma Phi Epsilon as were the other two members of our party that night. Robert drowned when he fell out of the boat after our boat left a wind puff at 45 degrees. Three of us were all leaning over the elevated side of the boat to right it and thus avoid capsizing (called ‘hiking out’ in sailing terms). Exiting the wind puff at great speed, the boat then smacked down hard in the water. This sudden jar caused Robert to flip head over heels. I know this because he was right beside me and I almost went over too. We made all efforts possible, throwing out life preservers, reversing course, etc. However, we never saw him again.

The Chessmen continued, in spite of the tragedy. The replacement for Patton was Jimmie Vaughan from Oak Cliff, brother of Stevie Ray Vaughan, who had previously played in other local garage bands such as the Royals and the Gentlemen, and was brought in by lead guitarist Johnny Peebles, but upon joining the group Vaughan took over the role of lead guitar. At the time Vaughan was only fifteen, but was, even then, recognized around the area for his guitar playing. According to Alan Paul in Guitar World, "His ability to play note-perfect versions of the day’s hits helped make … [the Chessmen] one of the city’s top club and college-circuit draws". According to Vaughan, "I was making 300 bucks a week, more money than my dad. Everyone else in the band was 21, and I was this little kid with attitude and a Telecaster. I knew all the licks". Drummer Doyle Bramhall became the group's primary vocalist. The Chessmen's final single released in September 1966 featured the reappearance of "No More" from their previous single, but this time as an A-side. The flip side was the lighter "When You Lost Someone You Love". It is the group's only recording with Jimmie Vaughan. Johnny Peebles left the band in early 1967, and Bill Etheridge replaced him on rhythm guitar and keyboards. Under this lineup, they opened for the Jimi Hendrix Experience in Dallas in 1968. The Chessmen broke up later that year.

=== Later developments and legacy ===
Jimmie Vaughan, Tommy Carter and Bill Etheridge formed a blues rock group called Texas with Sammy Piazza on drums and Cecil Cotten, formerly of Texas garage band, the Briks, on vocals. Initially, their manager was Jimmy Rabbit. After Cotton departed for California, Doyle Brahmall joined as lead vocalist. The group moved to Austin and Jimmie Vaughan's younger brother Stevie Ray Vaughan joined on bass and Bill Campbell on drums. They eventually changed their name to Texas Storm.

In a sentiment echoed by other observers, music writer Chris Bishop in Garage Hangover.com states: "The Chessmen feature in almost every account of the Dallas music scene in the mid and late ’60s." They were famous at the time for their live shows. They are now remembered for several members who later went on to national and international fame, such as Jimmie Vaughan, brother of Stevie Ray Vaughan of the Fabulous Thunderbirds; Doyle Bramhall who played with and wrote songs for Stevie Ray Vaughan; and Bill Etheridge who played bass with ZZ Top before Dusty Hill. In Mike Markesich's Teenbeat Mayhem, based on the balloting of a panel of noted writers and garage rock experts, their song "I Need You There" is ranked No. 195 in the top 1000 garage rock songs (the book includes over 16,000 songs in the genre), placing it in the top 200 garage rock songs of all time. The song was re-issued on the Teenage Shutdown! The World Ain't Round, It's Square! compilation issued by Crypt Records.

Billy Etheridge was the biological father of the Tony Award-winning actress and singer Kristin Chenoweth, though she was given up for adoption as an infant.

=== 1964 ===
- Robert Patton (guitar and vocals)
- Ron DiIulio (keyboards)
- Tommy Carter (bass)
- Tommy Carrigan (drums)

=== 1965 (transition) ===
- Robert Patton (guitar and vocals)
- Jimmy Kay (aka Jimmy Kay Herbert) (guitar)
- Ricky Marshall (guitar)
- Richard Dace (guitar)
- Tommy Carter (bass and vocals)
- Tom Carrigan (drums)

=== 1965 ===
- Robert Patton (guitar and vocals)
- Jim Herbert (guitar and vocals)
- Tommy Carter (bass and vocals)
- Tom Carrigan (drums)

=== 1966 ===
- Robert Patton (guitar and vocals)
- Johnny Peebles (guitar)
- Tommy Carter (bass and vocals)
- Doyle Bramhall (drums and vocals)

=== 1966-1967 ===
- Jimmie Vaughan (lead guitar)
- Johnny Peebles (guitar)
- Tommy Carter (bass and vocals)
- Doyle Bramhall (drums and vocals)

=== 1967-1968 ===
- Jimmie Vaughan (lead guitar)
- Bill Etheridge (rhythm guitar, keyboards, and vocals)
- Tommy Carter (bass and vocals)
- Doyle Bramhall (drums and vocals)

== Discography ==
- "I Need You There" b/w "Sad" (Bismark 1012, October 1965)
- "You're Gonna Be Lonely" b/w "No More" (B.R.S. 1014, April 1966)
- "No More" b/w "When You Lost Someone You Love" (Bismark 1015, September 1966)

== Bibliography ==
- Markesich, Mike (2012). Teenbeat Mayhem (1st ed.). Branford, Connecticut: Priceless Info Press. p. 80. ISBN 978-0-985-64825-1.
