= The Dagenites =

American garage rock band (1964–1966)

- The Dagenites, (1965).

Background information
- Origin: Oxon Hill, Maryland, United States
- Genres: Garage rock, protopunk, rock and roll
- Years active: 1964–1966
- Labels: Pixie, Heigh-Ho
- Past members: John Bardi; Bruce Kennett; Geoff Robinson; Roger Fallin; Jimmy Musgrove; Julian Bardi; Jon Rowzie

The Dagenites were an American garage rock a band from Oxon Hill, Maryland near Washington, DC, who were active in the 1960s. They shared management and frequent billing with noted guitarist and performer Link Wray. In recent years their work has become highly regarded amongst garage rock enthusiasts and collectors and has been included on several compilations. The Dagenites are especially known for their proto-punk anthems, "I Don't Want to Try it Again" and "I'm Gone Slide", both of which have been mentioned as garage rock classics.

== History ==
The Dagenites were formed in 1964 in Oxon Hill, Maryland outside of Washington, DC. The band would practice in their parents' basements and their original lineup consisted of John Bardi on lead guitar, Bruce Kennett on rhythm guitar, Geoff Robinson on bass and Roger Fallin on drums. The group wanted a name to tie-in with the popular British Invasion. Lead guitarist John Bardi's mother had grown up in a working-class neighborhood in Dagenham, a suburb of London. The group chose the name "Dagenites" as a reference to her birthplace. The Group's manager also managed Link Wray, who was living in Maryland at the time, which led to weekly bookings with Wray at the nearby 1023 Club. The Dagenites were noted for their loud performances. According to Geoffrey Robinson, a member of Wray's group, the Raymen:

They were THE loudest band ever! When we'd play with them you'd look at the bar and the glasses and bottles would be MOVING AROUND!

Rhythm guitarist Bruce Kennet's father knew the owner of Pixie records in Dayton, Ohio and it was arranged for the band to go there and record for the label. Pixie had also released records by garage bands such as the Bittervetch and the Stone Hearts. In early spring 1965, the group travelled to Dayton and taped their first single, "I Don’t Want to Try It Again", a raucous number written by bassist Geoff Robinson. The lead vocal and lyrics are hard to make out, but the song is apparently about not wanting to be lure back into a bad relationship. Before John Bardi's guitar solo, one of the other members can be heard shouting, "Play it J.B.!" That song appeared on the A-side and was backed with a ballad, "Now that Summer's Gone", written by band member Bruce Kennett. The initial pressing run for promotional copies of the record accidentally printed the name of the group as "the Joy Boys", and "Fencoe" as the label name. The manufacturer compensated for these errors by pasting new labels on top of the old ones. Several hundred of these errant promo copies were pressed, before the standard copies went into production.

After band bassist and lead vocalist Geoff Robinson and rhythm guitarist Bruce Kennett graduated from high school in the spring of 1965, they departed and were replaced by new personnel. John Bardi’s younger brother, Julian, joined on bass and Jon Rowzie on rhythm guitar. The group needed a lead vocalist, so they added Jimmy Musgrove to the band's roster. In the summer of 1965 the band auditioned in a talent search for Heigh Ho Records, a label run by Ron Barnett. John Bardi described Barnett as "a beatnik looking character probably in his mid-20s, maybe a few years older". Bardi and his brother applied on behalf of the band and, flowing a successful audition, they landed a contract with Heigh Ho. Barnett had initially wanted the group to change their names to the Howling Wolves and have a trained wolf to appear with the group during their performances. According to Bardi:

We of course mocked the idea, but he had such an air of certainty about him, and he DID have this recording contract, that we went along. He had big ideas. I once heard that he had become a successful producer (I can believe it), but apart from that, I never heard anything about him after our short time together.

That novel idea eventually got scrapped, and the band continued to play and record as the Dagenites. They traveled to New York to record their follow-up single, "I'm Gone Slide", which appeared on Heigh-Ho in September, 1965. The song is credited to Barnett, who came up with the idea for the song and wrote the words, but John Bardi arranged the music. Jimmy Musgrove supplied the aptly insolent and "punky" lead vocal. A session man who had played on Wilson Pickett's recording of "Mustang Sally" was hired to play the organ part in "I’m Gone Slide". According to John Bardi, in between takes, he told the band stories about recording "Mustang Sally". For the B-Side the band recorded a new version of "Now That Summer’s Gone". Several other cuts that were recorded at the New York sessions including an updated version of "I Don’t Want to Try It Again" with harmonies and a different guitar break, as well as two songs that would appear on their next single in February 1966: the A-side "The Fugitive" and for the flip-side a version of Leiber and Stoller's "Poison Ivy". "The Fugitive" was going to be used as the theme song for the TV series the Fugitive, but the show got scrapped that summer before it went onto air. According to John Bardi, the number, whose lyrics read, "Once I was a respected man, but then they said I killed with my hands…" would very likely have been the first song recorded by a rock group for such a series. "The Fugitive" earned a pick hit review in Record World, but the television show's cancellation dashed hopes of the record's success. The later recording of "I Don't Want to Try it Again" is rumored to have been issued on very limited supply single, Heigh Ho #636. By June 1966 the group had disbanded.

John Bardi has continued to play music over the years. In 2008, the Dagenites briefly re-united with members from both lineups at a party thrown by singer Jimmy Musgrove for former Oxen Hill classmates and friends. In the intervening years the band's material has come to the attention of garage rock enthusiasts and collectors. In Mike Markesich's book, Teenbeat Mayhem, in the section that ranks the top 1000 garage rock songs of all time, voted on by a panel of noted garage writers and experts (out of the more than 16,000 songs mentioned in the book), "I Don't Want to Try it Again" ranks #149 and "I'm Gone Slide" #352, respectively. Noted garage rock writer and expert, Chris Bishop at Garage Hangover, mentions the Dagenites as "a great band" and Tim Warren of Crypt Records invokes them as "the mighty Dagenites". Two of their songs have been re-issued by Crypt Records: "I Don’t Want to Try It Again" appears on Back from the Grave, Volume 8 and "I'm Gone Slide" is included on the Last of the Garage Punk Unknowns, Volume 5 LP (and volumes 5&6 CD). Both songs appear on the Psychedelic States: Maryland in the 60s, put out by Gear Fab Records. The Dagenites are also represented on the anthology Highs in the Sixties: The South. Since the 2008 reunion, lead vocalist Jimmy Musgrove and bassist Julian Bardi have both died.

== Membership ==
=== 1964 through mid-1965 ===
- John Bardi (lead guitar)
- Bruce Kennett (rhythm guitar)
- Geoff Robinson (bass and vocals)
- Roger Fallin (drums)

=== Late 1965 through 1966 ===
- Jimmy Musgrove (lead vocals)
- John Bardi (lead guitar)
- Jon Rowzie (rhythm guitar)
- Julian Bardi (bass)
- Roger Fallin (drums)

== Discography ==
- "I Don’t Want to Try It Again" b/w "Now that Summer's Gone" (Pixie 204, March 1965)
- "I'm Gone Slide" b/w "Now that Summer's gone" (Heigh Ho 619, September 1965)
- "The Fugitive" b/w "Poison Ivy" (Heigh Ho 625, February 1966)
- "I Don’t Want to Try It Again" (later recording) b/w "I Keep Running" (Heigh Ho 636, 1966)

== Bibliography ==
- Markesich, Mike (2012). Teenbeat Mayhem (1st ed.). Branford, Connecticut: Priceless Info Press. ISBN 978-0-985-64825-1.
