= Black Pearl (American band) =

American band

- Origin: San Francisco, California, United States
- Genre: Rock and roll
- Years active: 1967–1978
- Past members: Bernie "B.B" Fieldings; Bruce Benson; Oak O'Connor; Geoffrey Morris; Tom Mulcahy; Jerry Causi; Bobby Mason; Tom Becker; E. Rodney Jones

Black Pearl was an American rock and roll band, formed in San Francisco, California, which was active from 1967 to 1978.

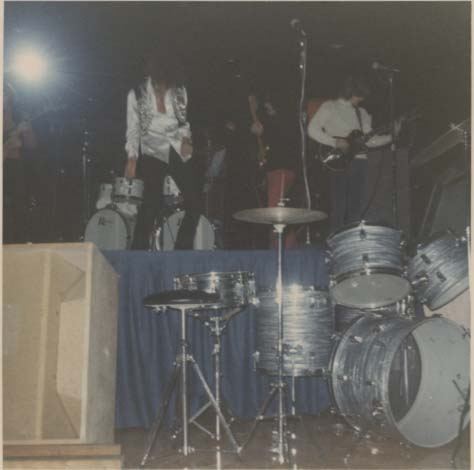
Black Pearl - Boulder - 1968

== History ==
Black Pearl was composed of Bernie "B.B" Fieldings (vocals), Bruce Benson (guitar), Oak O'Connor (drums), Geoffrey Morris (guitar), Tom Mulcahy (guitar), and Jerry Causi (bass).

Fieldings was a showman who based his stage presence on that of James Brown. His admiration for Brown was evident on the group's live album, which contains a twelve-minute version of Brown's "Cold Sweat". As noted by one reviewer, "Black Pearl crank out some hard rockin' psych-rock music with the most ferocious drumbeats you've heard in a while." The band's three guitar lineup was considered powerful, being a format also found in contemporaries Moby Grape and Buffalo Springfield.

Black Pearl released two albums, Black Pearl (1969) and Black Pearl - Live! (1970), with the second being less well-received than the first.

By the time of the 1970 release of the second album, the original band had broken up. Morris, O'Connor and Mulcahy continued as Black Pearl, playing initially as a power trio. Later musicians were Bobby Mason (vocals), Tom Becker (harmonica, vocals) and E. Rodney Jones (bass). The band finally broke up in 1978, followed by reunion shows in 1988, 1996, and 1999,

== The Barbarians ==
Three of the members of Black Pearl, Morris, Causi, and Benson, had been members of the Barbarians, a 1960s garage band noted for their single, "Are You a Boy or Are You A Girl". Causi and Benson had appeared on The T.A.M.I Show live at the Santa Monica Civic Auditorium in 1964, and had a handful of appearances on Shindig!, this time with Morris. When the Barbarians drummer, Moulty, refused to travel to Boulder, Colorado, for a two-week engagement, new drummer, Oak O'Connor, plus Mulcahy and Fieldings, joined with ex-Barbarians Morris, Causi, and Benson, all initially based in Boston, to form Black Pearl in 1967. The band relocated from Boston to San Francisco, after a period of time in Colorado. The band, after fulfilling the Boulder, Colorado engagement, became quite popular in that city, influencing local bands such as Zephyr, featuring guitarist Tommy Bolin (d. 1976) and lead singer Candy Givens (d. 1984). Givens was greatly influenced by Fieldings' stage presence, and through Fieldings, met his then girlfriend, Janis Joplin, who commented favourably on Givens' stage performance.

== B.B Fieldings ==
Bernie Fieldings was born on August 14, 1946, and was the vocalist for the band. He died on March 13, 2005, at the age of 58.

== Geoffrey Morris ==
Geoffrey Morris was born in the mid 1940s in Massachusetts. He had joined the Barbarians in 1965, replacing their original guitarist Ronnie Enos.

== Members ==
- Bernie "B.B" Fieldings - Vocals (1967 - 1970) (Died 2005)
- Bobby Mason - Vocals (1970 - 1978; 1988; 1996; 1999)
- Tom Becker - Vocals, Harmonica (1970 - 1978; 1988; 1996; 1999)
- Bruce Benson - Guitar (1967 - 1970)
- Tom Mulcahy - Guitar (1967 - 1978; 1988; 1996; 1999)
- Geoffrey Morris - Guitar (1967 - 1978; 1988; 1996; 1999)
- Jerry Causi - Bass Guitar (1967 - 1970)
- E. Rodney Jones - Bass Guitar (1970 - 1978; 1988; 1996; 1999)
- Oak O' Connor - Acoustic Drum Kit (1967 - 1978; 1988; 1996; 1999)

== Discography ==
=== Albums ===
Year	Title	Peak chart positions
Year	Title	US BB
1969	Black Pearl	130
1970	Black Pearl Live!	189
