= The Invaders (band) =

Bermudian R&B band (1968–1970)

The Invaders was an R&B band in the island of Bermuda during the late 1960s. They had a hit with "Spacing Out".

== Background ==
The Invaders was started by Ralph Richardson in Bermuda in 1968. It included Lloyd Williams as well. Williams had come in to replace the saxophonist. In 1969, the band produced its first hit 45, "Spacing Out", written by Richardson, which made it to the top of the Bermuda charts and remained there for several weeks. Within a few months, the band produced its first album with the same title. Both 45 and album were underwritten by Eddie De Mello.

== Album ==
Their lone album Spacing Out which has some similarity to the funk of The Meters is highly collectable.

== Career ==
By late 1969, Phillips Recording Studios in the UK offered the band a six-month tour of Europe and a recording contract. By 1970, the band, whose members where then part-time musicians, decided to call it quits.

In 1997, De Mello digitized the original sound tracks and produced a CD of the album which is still available.

== Band members ==
- Ralph Richardson Sr - Trumpet
- Sturgis Griffin Jr - Congas
- Lloyd Williams - Alto Sax / Flute
- Artie Simmons - Tenor Sax (Guest)
- Stan Gilbert - Bass
- John Burch - Guitar
- Mike Stowe - Drums
