= The Moods (Australian band) =

Australian garage rock band

- Origin: Melbourne, Victoria, Australia
- Genres: Garage rock
- Years active: 1965–1967
- Label: His Master's Voice
- Past members: Kevin Fraser; John Livi; Mick Hamilton; Peter Noss; Carl Savona; Ian Ferguson

The Moods were an Australian garage rock band from Melbourne, who were active during the 1960s. They became one of the most popular groups in the Malbourne area and released two singles for His Master's Voice, including the song "Rum Drunk", which is now regarded as a garage rock classic. "Rum Drunk" and several of their other songs have been included on various compilations.

== History ==
The Moods were formed in Melbourne in 1965. Their original membership consisted of Kevin Fraser (b. 1947) on lead vocals, John Livi (b. 1951) on lead guitar, Mick Hamilton (b. 1947) on rhythm guitar, Peter Noss on bass, and Carl Savona (b. 1949) on drums. John Livi had begun playing guitar at the age of twelve. He was initially influenced by the instrumentals of groups such as the Shadows, and he became adept on the instrument. But, when he heard "I Want to Hold Your Hand", by the Beatles, his musical tastes began to shift in favour of the new sounds coming from England. His brother Bernie Livi introduced him to several musician-friends, who wanted to start a Beatles-influenced group, which they named the Moods. Peter Raphael became their manager, and made it possible for them to get regular gigs at local venues, such as at mod clubs, which were all the rage at the time. Like the British groups, the Moods wore long hair (for the times), which caused difficulties at school for John Livi, who was only fourteen, and was instructed by the principal to, either cut his hair, or be expelled. Livi chose to quit school and took business classes in the day and played with the Moods at night.

By 1966, restrictive laws in Australia, such as the rule requiring bars to close at 6:00 pm, were relaxed, and the old British monetary system was converted from pence, shillings, and pounds, to a modern decimal system. In February a new music paper, Go Set, was premiered to great fanfare, and the Moods' manager, Peter Raphael, was the head of its advertising department. Rahael used his position to provide publicity for the group. In addition to ample advertisement space, the band received regular write-ups in columns. Raphael arranged for a record deal with His Master's Voice, where the group released its debut single, "Cos of You" b/w "Say Hello to Me". "Cos of You" was an upbeat rocker, with a moody folk-inflected flip-side "Say Hello to Me".

Though the single failed to break the national charts, it garnished accolades. DJ Stan Rofe touted the song in Go Set and predicted that the Moods would become the most popular group in Australia after the ensuing departure of the Easy Beats to England. The Moods were playing shows almost every night in Melbourne. They toured Adelaide and Sydney and appeared on popular television programmes, Go!!, Kommotion,’Ten On The Town’, ‘It’s All Happening’, and Saturday Date and opened for the Rolling Stones on their 1966 tour of Australia. They played at Myers in-Gear, a popular mod haberdashery, that provided outfitting the group. Bassist Peter Noss departed and was replaced by Ian Ferguson, who had played with Melbourne's Tony and the Shantels. Their next single featured on it is the song for which they have become best-known, "Rum Drunk", whose lyrics depict the hopeless life of a drunken roustabout. The B-side was "I Love You So". They recorded the single at Bill Armstrong’s Telefil Studios. Like their first record, it failed to chart. The group was dropped from His Master's Voice. In 1966, Mick Hamilton left to join The Vibrants. In 1967, John Livi quit and the band broke up shortly thereafter.

Bassist Ian Ferguson joined Running, Jumping, Standing Still. In the 1970s he played in the blues band, Carson. Drummer Carl Savona joined the group Brigade, who released two singles on the Astor label. Paul Anderson became involved with the cabaret act, the City Stompers, who also recorded for Astor. John Livi, despite his talent as a guitarist, left the music business. Mick Hamilton became a session musician, playing throughout the world, and formed the rockabilly band, The Mighty Guys. In 2002 he released a country and folk-flavoured album, Alone at Last. He has recorded several albums with Keith Glass and others. In 2002 he recorded a solo album entitled Alone at Last.

In the intervening years, the Moods have become highly regarded by garage rock commentators and enthusiasts. Australian music historian Dean Mittlehousen has mentioned them as one of his favourite groups from the era. Their song, "Rum Drunk", was included on the Down Under Nuggets: Original Australian Artyfacts 1965–1967 compilation put out by Festival Records and on the Ugly Things CD and LP sets issued by Raven Records. "Cos of You" appeared on Devil's Children, Volume 2 and "Say Hello to Me" is included on Oz Beat Frenzy, Volume 1. Ian D. Marks has called "Rum Drunk" "an angst-ridden masterpiece" and a "cult garage classic". According to guitarist Mick Hamilton, "It's nice to be remembered and that people think you are relevant in some sort of way..."

== Members ==
- Kevin Fraser (lead vocals)
- John Livi (lead guitar)
- Mick Hamilton (rhythm guitar)
- Peter Noss (bass)
- Carl Savona (drums)
- Ian Ferguson (bass)

== Discography ==
- "Cos of You" b/w "Say Hello to Me" (His Master's Voice EA-4747, March 1966)
- "Rum Drunk" b/w "I Love You so" (His Master's Voice EA-4768, June 1966)

== Bibliography ==
- Marks, Ian; McIntyre, Iain (2010). Wild About You: The Sixties Beat Explosion in Australia and New Zealand. Portland, London, Melbourne: Verse Chorus Press. ISBN 978-1-89124-128-4.
