= The World Ain't Round It's Square =

Single by The Savages
- A-side: "The World Ain't Round, it's Square"
- B-side: "You're on My Mind"
- Released: 1966
- Recorded: 1966
- Genre: Garage rock
- Length: 2:53
- Label: Duane
- Songwriter(s): Howie Rego and Bobby Zuill
- Producer(s): Eddie DeMello

"The World Ain't Round It's Square" is a song recorded in 1966 by The Savages, a garage rock band from Bermuda and was written by Howie Rego and Bobby Zuill. It was recorded live at the Hub, a nightclub at the Princess Hotel in Bermuda and appeared on their live album taped from the event, Live 'n Wild. The song has been mentioned as a landmark anthem of 1960s youthful defiance and is ranked #4 in the list of the 1000 greatest garage rock records in Mike Markesich's Teenbeat Mayhem. It has been featured on the Teenage Shutdown! The World Ain't Round, It's Square! compilation as well as included the reissue of Live 'n Wild.

== History ==
=== Background ===
"The World Ain't Round It's Square" was written by Howie Rego and Bobby Zuill and performed by the Savages from Bermuda. The Savages were formed in 1965. Their membership consisted of Paul Muggleton and Jimmy O'Connor on guitar, Zuill, on bass, and Rego, on drums. Muggleton usually handled lead vocals, but Zuill sang lead on "The World Ain't Round, It's Square." The band were able to gain a residence at the Hub, a nightclub at the Princess Hotel, sometimes doing as many a three gigs a day, often for American college students on vacation. They signed a recording contract with the Duane label, run by Eddie DeMello, who would also manage the band and produce their material.

On February 6, 1966, the Savages were recorded during a live performance in front of about 150 patrons at the Hub, a nightclub at the Princess Hotel, which featured the band doing several songs such as "The World Ain't Round It's Square," sung in a scowling voice by Bobby Zuill. According to Rob Zuill, "...we were so scared that we played everything too fast…" "The World Ain't Round It's Square" would appear on the resulting 1966 album, Live 'n Wild, taped from the show and released on Duane Records. The song would appear on a single later that year b/w "You're on my Mind." The band's manager set up a tour of the West Indies for the band and arranged for them to go to New York to play and record. However, just as they were beginning to establish themselves in New York, the members got involved in a life-threatening incident, provoked by two members of the band. As a result of hard feelings created by the incident, the band broke up before the end of the year.

=== Legacy ===
"The World Ain't Round It's Square" is now considered seminal anthem of youthful defiance and is considered one of the greatest songs in garage rock. In Mike Markesich's Teenbeat Mayhem, according to the polling of a handful of preeminent garage rock writers and experts, the song is rated as a ten out of ten, and ranked at #4 in the list of the 1000 greatest garage rock records, placing it in the top five of all time, according to that poll. The song has appeared on the Teenage Shutdown! The World Ain't Round, It's Square! compilation named for the song, as well as on the reissue of Live 'n Wild.

== Discography ==
=== Album ===
- Live 'n Wild (Duane ELP 1047, rel. 1966)

=== Single ===
- "The World Ain't Round It's Square" b/w "You're on My Mind" (Duane 1054, rel. 1966)
