= Doug Morris =

American record executive (born 1938)

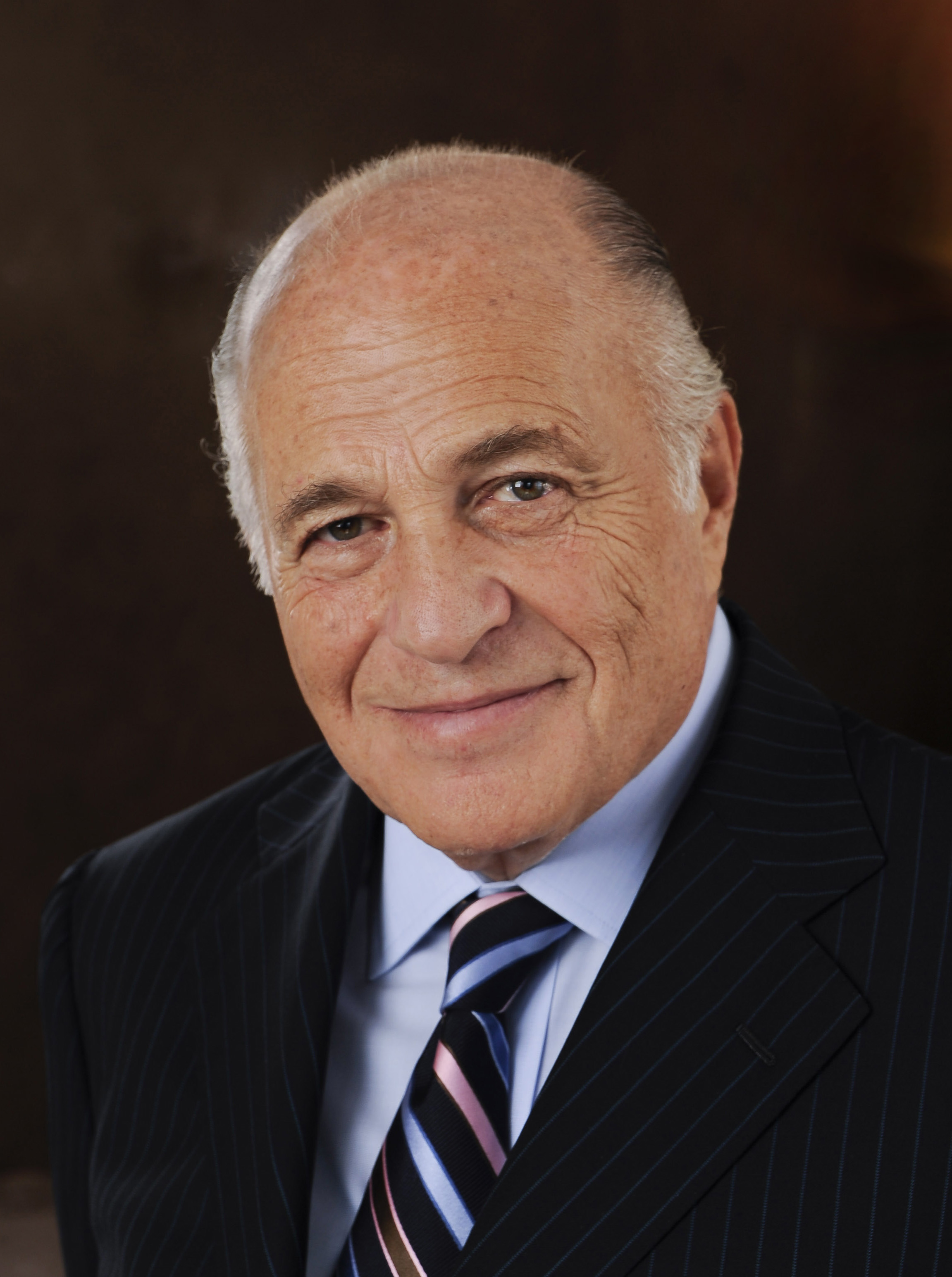
- Morris in January 2010
- Born: November 23, 1938 (age 87)
- Education: Columbia University (BA)
- Occupation: Record executive
- Years active: 1960s–present

Doug Morris (born November 23, 1938) is an American record executive. He was chairman and chief executive officer (CEO) of Universal Music Group from 1995 to 2011 and Sony Music Entertainment from 2011 to 2017. In 2018, he founded the record label 12Tone, which was acquired by Warner Records in 2021.

== Life and career ==
=== Early life and career ===
Born to Jewish parents, Morris grew up in Woodmere, Long Island, in the state of New York. His father, Walter Bernard Morris, was a lawyer, and his mother was a ballet instructor. He is a graduate of Columbia University. He began a career in the music industry as a songwriter for Robert Mellin, Inc., a music publisher. In 1965, Morris produced the self-titled debut album by the then-unknown garage band the Barbarians, which spawned two hit singles: "Are You a Boy or Are You a Girl" and "Moulty", both of which Morris co-wrote. Morris wrote "Sweet Talkin' Guy", a 1966 hit for The Chiffons, and produced the hit "Smokin' In the Boys Room" (1973) for Brownsville Station. After joining Laurie Records as a songwriter and producer in 1965, Morris eventually became vice-president and general manager of the record label. He later started his own label, Big Tree Records, which was acquired by Atlantic Records in 1974, which led to Morris becoming president of Atco Records and an association with Warner Music.

Morris became president of Atlantic Records in 1980, and became co-chairman and co-CEO of the Atlantic Recording Group, alongside Ahmet Ertegun, in 1990. Morris played an integral role in making Atlantic the leading company in the Warner Music Group. In 1994, Morris shifted to the position of president and chief operating officer of Warner Music U.S., and was soon named chairman. Morris lost an executive battle at Warner leading to his departure from Warner Music in 1995.

=== Career at Universal Music Group ===
Morris began working with MCA Records in July 1995 by forming a joint venture record label, which became Universal Records when Morris was appointed chairman and CEO of MCA Music Entertainment Group in November 1995. The company was renamed Universal Music Group the following year. He was honored with a star on the Hollywood Walk of Fame; his ceremony was held on January 26, 2010, at the corner of Hollywood and Vine.

Morris was heavily criticized by music journalists for his approach to streaming services, especially the infamous PressPlay.

Lucian Grainge replaced Morris as CEO on January 1, 2011, and later replaced him as chairman on March 9, 2011.

=== Sony Music Entertainment chairman and CEO ===
Morris became chairman and CEO of Sony Music Entertainment on July 1, 2011. After Morris' arrival, Sony Music restructured two of its label groups. The RCA/Jive Label Group had been split in half, being separated from the Jive Label Group. Peter Edge was promoted to CEO of the RCA Music Group. L.A. Reid became the chairman and CEO of Epic Records shortly after Morris' arrival. Some Jive artists have been moved to Epic while others have been moved to the RCA. In addition to splitting the RCA/Jive Label Group, the Columbia/Epic Label Group was also split. In October 2011 Morris announced that Mel Lewinter had been appointed executive vice president of Label Strategy at Sony Music. On April 1, 2017, he was replaced as CEO of Sony Music Entertainment by Rob Stringer, who was the CEO of Columbia Records.

=== 12Tone Music Group ===
In 2018, Morris founded the label 12Tone Music Group. His first signing to the label was American rapper Anderson .Paak. The label's assets were acquired by Warner Music Group in 2021.

=== Founder of VEVO ===
Morris's progressive digital strategies led him to become the first media executive to monetize online music videos, essentially helping to create the music video-on-demand market online.

As the founder (and former chairman) of VEVO, Morris partnered with Google chairman Eric Schmidt to launch the new premium music video and entertainment service in late 2009. Within its first month of launch, VEVO amassed an unprecedented 35 million unique viewers in the U.S., instantly making it the #1 music entertainment destination on the Web, according to comScore.

=== Motown: The Musical ===
In 2013, Morris was co-producer and lead financier of the Broadway musical Motown: The Musical. Based on the life story of Motown founder Berry Gordy, and featuring classic songs from the Motown catalog, Motown: The Musical was nominated for four Tony Awards and was the top-selling new musical of the 2012–13 season.

=== Awards and leadership ===
Morris is on the board of directors of CBS Corporation, The Robin Hood Foundation, The Cold Spring Harbor Laboratory, and The Rock -N- Roll Hall of Fame Foundation. In 2003, the National Academy of Recording Arts and Sciences (NARAS) awarded Morris with the President's Merit Award, honoring his consistent creative commitment to artistic and entrepreneurial excellence and longstanding support for the music and world communities. In 2008, Morris was honored with City of Hope's Spirit of Life award, and in 2009, he received the NARAS Icons award as well as a star on the world-famous Hollywood Walk of Fame. In 2014, Morris was honored by the Songwriters Hall of Fame with the Howie Richmond Hitmaker Award in recognition of being a star maker in the music industry who has been responsible for a substantial number of hit songs. In 2015, he received an honorary doctorate from the Berklee College of Music in recognition of his achievements and influence in music, and for his enduring contributions to American and international culture.

Preceded by Rolf Schmidt-Holtz	Chairman & Chief Executive Officer of Sony Music Entertainment; July 1, 2011-April 2017	Succeeded by Rob Stringer

Preceded by first	Chief Executive Officer of Universal Music Group; November 1995 to January 1, 2011	Succeeded by Lucian Grainge
