= The Savages (Bermuda band) =

Bermuda garage rock band

Background information
- Origin: Hamilton, Bermuda
- Genres: Garage rock, rock and roll, protopunk, pop music
- Years active: 1965–1966 · 2026–present
- Label: Duane
- Members: Paul Muggleton; Jimmy O'Connor; Bobby Zuil; Howie Rego

The Savages were a English garage rock & pop music band from Hamilton, Bermuda that were active in the mid-1960s. They are best remembered for their album, Live 'n Wild, which was composed largely of self-penned tunes and recorded in front of a live audience, has been mentioned as a seminal work in the genre, and features the song, "The World Ain't Round It's Square". This song has become regarded as a classic 1960s anthem of youthful defiance. (Note: In Mike Markesich's Teenbeat Mayhem, according to the polling of a handful of preeminent garage rock writers, collectors, and experts, the song is rated as a ten out of ten, and ranked at number 4 in the list of the 1000 greatest garage rock records, placing it in the top five of all time, according to that poll.)

== History ==
The Savages were formed in 1965 by Paul Muggleton and Jimmy O'Connor, both guitarists. They would often watch fellow Bermudan band, the Gents, play at nightclubs and decided to form a band of their own. They recruited Bobby Zuill, on bass, and Howie Rego, on drums. Muggleton usually sang lead vocals along with Jimmy O'Connor, but Zuill handled vocals on certain numbers. According to Paul Muggleton, "We were not sons of diplomants…my father was a printer…both Jimmy O'Connor's and bobby Zuill's fathers were sea captains and Howie Rego's father had a supermarket.“ The band played teen functions and eventually were able to gain a residence at the Hub, a nightclub at the Princess Hotel, sometimes doing as many a three gigs a day, often for American college students on vacation.

They would sign with the Duane label, which also housed the Gents, run by Eddie DeMello, who would also manage the band and produce their material. The group had previously done mostly covers of other artists' songs, until they were asked by the label to cut a full album of material, which necessitated the urge to come up with a batch of original songs. DeMello decided to record the album live as a way of capturing their natural excitement. So, on 6 February 1966, the band were recorded during a live performance in front of about 150 patrons at the Hub, which featured the group doing self-composed songs such as "Poor Man’s Son", "Man on the Moon", "Quiet Town", and the ventful "The World Ain't Round It's Square," sung in a scowling voice by Bobby Zuill and Paul Muggleton. According to Rob Zuill, "...we were so scared that we played everything too fast..." The album also would contain three cover songs from the performance, which would include a version of the Icelandic song, "Ertu Med" which would also be recorded in a very different manner by Thor's Hammer later in 1966. One of Savages' original songs recorded this night, "No No No," would be covered by Connecticut band The Instincts. The resulting album taken from the show, Live 'n Wild, was a surprisingly diverse collection, containing a balance of rock & roll songs and ballads. Four songs would appear as A and B sides on singles, including "The World Ain't Round It's Square."

DeMello set up a tour of the West Indies for the band and arranged for them to go to New York to play and record. While in New York, they recorded a single, featuring "Roses are Red," which would be released on the Duane label, later in 1966. However, just as they were beginning to establish themselves in New York, the members got involved in a life-threatening incident, provoked by two members of the band. As a result of hard feelings created by the incident, the band broke up before the end of the year.

Paul Muggleton, would later become a member of the group Omaha Sheriff in the 1970s and would produce 22 of Judie Tzuke's albums. Drummer Howie Rego is said to have played with mid-1970s progressive rock group Stardive, who recorded for Electra and Columbia.

== Legacy ==
Despite their brief tenure and lack of greater success, the Savages have become recognized by garage rock enthusiasts and collectors as a seminal band in the genre. Their album, Live 'n Wild, is sometimes cited as one of the finest albums produced in the genre, and the song, "The World Ain't Round, It's Square," which in some ways anticipated some of the characteristics of the later 1970s punk movement, has become regarded as a classic anthem of anger and defiance. (Note: In Mike Markesich's Teenbeat Mayhem, according to the polling of a handful of preeminent garage rock writers, collectors, and experts, the song is rated as a ten out of ten, and ranked at number 4 in the list of the 1000 greatest garage rock records, placing it in the top five of all time, according to that poll.) Yet, in spite of this and their name, the band was versatile and was as adept at writing and ballads as rocking songs.

== Personnel ==
=== Current line-up ===
- Paul Muggleton – guitar, lead vocals (1965–1966, 2026–)
- Jimmy O'Connor – guitar, vocals (1965–1966, 2026–)
- Bobby Zuill – bass, vocals (1965–1966, 2026–)
- Howie Rego – drums (1965–1966, 2026–)

== Discography ==
=== Singles ===
- "No No No" / "She's Gone" (Duane 1043, rel. 1966)
- "Roses Are Red My Love" / "Quiet Town" (Duane 1049, rel. 1966)
- "The World Ain't Round It’s Square" / "You're On My Mind" (Duane 1054, rel. 1966)

=== Albums ===
- Live 'n Wild (Duane ELP 1047, rel. 1966)
