= Simla Beat 70/71 =

Compilation album
- Released: February 15, 2000
- Recorded: 1970–1971
- Genre: Garage rock; psychedelic
- Length: 1:19:59
- Label: Normal

Simla Beat 70/71 is a garage rock compilation issued by Normal Records consisting of songs which originally appeared on the Simla Beat 70 and Simla Beat 71 albums showcasing bands who appeared at the All-India Simla Beat battle of the bands contests held those two years in Bombay, India. The Imperial Tobacco Company sponsored the annual events to advertise their Simla brand of menthol cigarettes which were marketed to the country's youth of the time. Groups from all around India would compete for first prize. The Simla Beat '70–71 compilation includes recordings of some of the bands who attended in 1970 and 1971. The album was not recorded live on stage, but in a primitive makeshift studio using very little overdubbing or sound reinforcement. Though recorded in the early 1970s, the music bears an uncanny resemblance to the kind of garage and psychedelic sounds more typical of 1966 and 1967 in Western countries, perhaps due to the India's' relative isolation and lack of technological progress in that era.

The set begins with "Voice From The Inner Soul" by the Confusions from Madras. The Dinosaurs, from Bangalore, follow with a sprited version of the Troggs' "You Can't Beat It", and appear again on "Sinister Purpose". The Eruptions, from Cuttack, do a version of Bo Diddley's "You Can't Judge a Book by the Cover". The Genuine Spares are represented by two cuts: "Proper Stranger" and "What's Going On". The Fentones, from Shillong, won first prize in 1971 and are heard doing the "Simla Beat Theme" and the garage ballad, "Until the Dawn". The Mini Beats perform "Gypsy Girl". Other bands included on the compilation are the Innerlight, Purple Flower, from Ahmedabad, and Hypnotic Eye. The Velvette Fogg, from Bombay, won second prize at the contest in 1971. Atomic Forest was another popular band of the time and recorded a proto-punk version of Deep Purple's "Mary Long".

== Track list ==
=== Disc one (Simla Beat 70) ===
1. The Confusions: "Voice From The Inner Soul" 3:00
2. The Dinosaurs: "You Can't Beat It" 2:54
3. The X'Lents: "Psychedelia" 2:53
4. The Innerlite: "Zorba's Dance" 3:21
5. The Genuine Spares: "Proper Stranger" 3:46
6. The Genuine Spares: "What's Going On" 2:45
7. The Dinosaurs: "Sinister Purpose" 3:09
8. The Great Bear: "Mist" 7:18
9. The X'Lents: "Born On The Bayou" 4:14
10. The Innerlite: "Baby Baby Please" 2:25

=== Disc two (Simla Beat 71) ===
1. The Fentones: "Simla Beat Theme" 3:01
2. The Nomads: "Nothing Is The Same" 5:08
3. The Hipnotic Eye: "Killing Floor" 2:42
4. The Mini Beats: "Hey Gipsy Girl" 3:02
5. The Velvette Fogg: "I Am So Glad" 7:42
6. The Black Beats: "The Mod Trade" 4:11
7. The Eruptions: "I Am Gonna Erupt" 3:36
8. The Fentones: "Until The Dawn" 3:04
9. The Brood Of Vipers: "Psychedelic Web" 5:20
10. The Eruptions: "You Can't Judge A Book" 3:03
11. The Hipnotic Eye: "Aimless Lady" 3:16

== Bibliography ==
- Bhatia, Sidharth (2014). India Psychedelic. India: Harper Collins Publishers. ISBN 978-93-5029-837-4.
