= Eddy DeMello =

Famous bermudian entrepreneur (died 2013)

- Born: Manuel Edward DeMello
- Died: March 6, 2013 (aged 75)
- Known for: Contribution to music and art of Bermuda

Eddy DeMello was a popular Bermudian entrepreneur, businessman, music promoter, record label owner and record producer. He has also made a notable contribution to the garage rock genre.

== Background ==
He was born Manuel Edward DeMello on November 10, 1937, in São Miguel Island, Azores, Portugal. He came to Bermuda in September 1949. As well as a prominent businessman, he has been described as an entertainment impresario, and longtime champion of Bermuda's Portuguese community. His involvement in the music business included being a record store owner and record production. He was one Bermuda's most successful concert promoters. His store was the Music Box on Reid Street.

For seventeen years he was president of the Vasco da Gama Club. For his work and contribution to Bermuda's music and art he was awarded the Bermuda Arts Council's Lifetime Achievement in 2004.

== Record labels and production ==
Starting in the 1960s, he produced many recordings that appeared his Duane and Edmar record labels. One album was Live 'n Wild by The Savages which is now considered a garage rock collectors piece. Other artists he produced were The Gents with their garage punk classic, "If You Don’t Come Back". Other groups include The Weads, The Bermuda Strollers and The Klan. He also designed and provided the liner notes for the Beautiful Bermuda album by The Merrymen. Duane is the name of DeMello's son.

=== Duane Records ===
Artists to have releases on his Duane label include Bishop Kane, The Savages, Silvertones, and The Weads.

List of 45s
Act	Release	Catalogue	Year	Notes #
The Silvertones	"Hurricane" / "Groovy Baby"	Duane 1021	1964	
The Ebbtides	"Star of Love" / "First Love"	Duane 1022	1964	
Lee Curtis	"My Love Don’t Go" / "I’d Do Anything For You"	Duane 1023	1964	
The Weads	"Today" / "Don't Call My Name"	Duane 4042	1965	
The Savages	"No No No" / "She's Gone"	Duane 45-1043	1965	
Bishop Kane	"Tenderness of You" / "Any Time That You Are Lonely"	Duane 1046	1966	
The Gents	"If You Don't Come Back" / "I'll Cry"	Duane 1048	1966	
The Savages	"Roses Are Red My Love" / "Quiet Town"	Duane 45-1049	196?	
The Savages	"You're On My Mind" / "The World Ain't Round It's Square"	Duane 45-1054	1966	
The Invaders	"Spacing Out" / "Latin Lips"	Duane 100	1969	
The Invaders	"Lost Time" / "Bossa Blue"	Duane 101	1970	
Stone Foxx	"Gypsy Lady" / "Agamemnon"	Duane 100	1973	

Albums
Act	Release	Catalogue	Year	Notes #
The Savages	Live n’ Wild	Duane LP-1047	1965	
The Invaders	Spacing Out	Duane LP-1101/1102	1970	

== Promotion ==
DeMello brought The Merrymen to Bermuda where they spent six weeks. This resulted in a friendship between him and the group which lasted for years. Among the artists that DeMello was instrumental in bringing to Bermuda were Ray Charles, Stevie Wonder and Amalia Rodrigues.

== Death ==
Following a long illness, DeMello died on March 6, 2013, at the age of 75.
