= Garage rock =

Genre of rock music

- Other names: Garage punk; '60s punk
- Stylistic origins: Rock and roll; blues; rockabilly; rhythm and blues; soul; surf; instrumental rock; beat
- Cultural origins: Late 1950s to early 1960s, United States and Canada
- Derivative forms: Proto-punk; punk rock; acid rock; bubblegum music; hard rock; heartland rock; heavy metal; paisley underground; power pop; psychobilly; grunge; indie surf; post-punk revival; punk blues

Subgenres
- Frat rock

Fusion genres
- Garage punk

Regional scenes
- United States; Canada; United Kingdom; Australia; Netherlands; Mexico; Uruguay; Peru; Japan; Iran; India; Cambodia

Other topics
- Blues rock; folk rock; jangle pop; new wave; psychedelic rock

Garage rock (sometimes called garage punk or '60s punk) is a raw and energetic style of rock and roll that flourished in the mid-1960s, most commonly in the United States and Canada, and has experienced a series of subsequent revivals. The style is frequently characterized by basic chord structures played on electric guitars and other instruments, often distorted through a fuzzbox, as well as sometimes unsophisticated or aggressive lyrics and delivery. Its name derives from the perception that groups were often made up of young amateurs who rehearsed in the family garage, although many were professional.

In the US and Canada, surf rock—and later the Beatles and other beat groups of the British Invasion—motivated thousands of young people to form bands between 1963 and 1968. Hundreds of grass-roots acts produced regional hits, some of which gained national popularity, usually played on AM radio stations. With the advent of psychedelia, numerous garage bands incorporated exotic elements into the genre's primitive stylistic framework. After 1968, as more sophisticated forms of rock music came to dominate the marketplace, garage rock records largely disappeared from national and regional charts, and the movement faded. Other countries in the 1960s experienced similar rock movements that have sometimes been characterized as variants of garage rock.

During the 1960s, garage rock was not recognized as a distinct genre and had no specific name, but critical hindsight in the early 1970s—and especially the 1972 compilation album Nuggets—did much to define and memorialize the style. Between 1971 and 1973, certain American rock critics began to retroactively identify the music as a genre and for several years used the term "punk rock" to describe it, making it the first form of music to bear the description, predating the more familiar use of the term appropriated by the later punk rock movement that its musical approach influenced. The term "garage rock" gained favor amongst commentators and devotees during the 1980s. The style has also been referred to as "proto-punk", or, in certain instances, "frat rock".

In the early to mid-1980s, several revival scenes emerged featuring acts that consciously attempted to replicate the look and sound of 1960s garage bands. Later in the decade, a louder, more contemporary garage subgenre developed that combined garage rock with modern punk rock and other influences, sometimes using the garage punk label originally and otherwise associated with 1960s garage bands. In the 2000s, a wave of garage-influenced acts associated with the post-punk revival emerged, and some achieved commercial success. Garage rock continues to appeal to musicians and audiences who prefer a "back to basics" or the "DIY (Do-It-Yourself)" musical approach.

== Social milieu and stylistic features ==
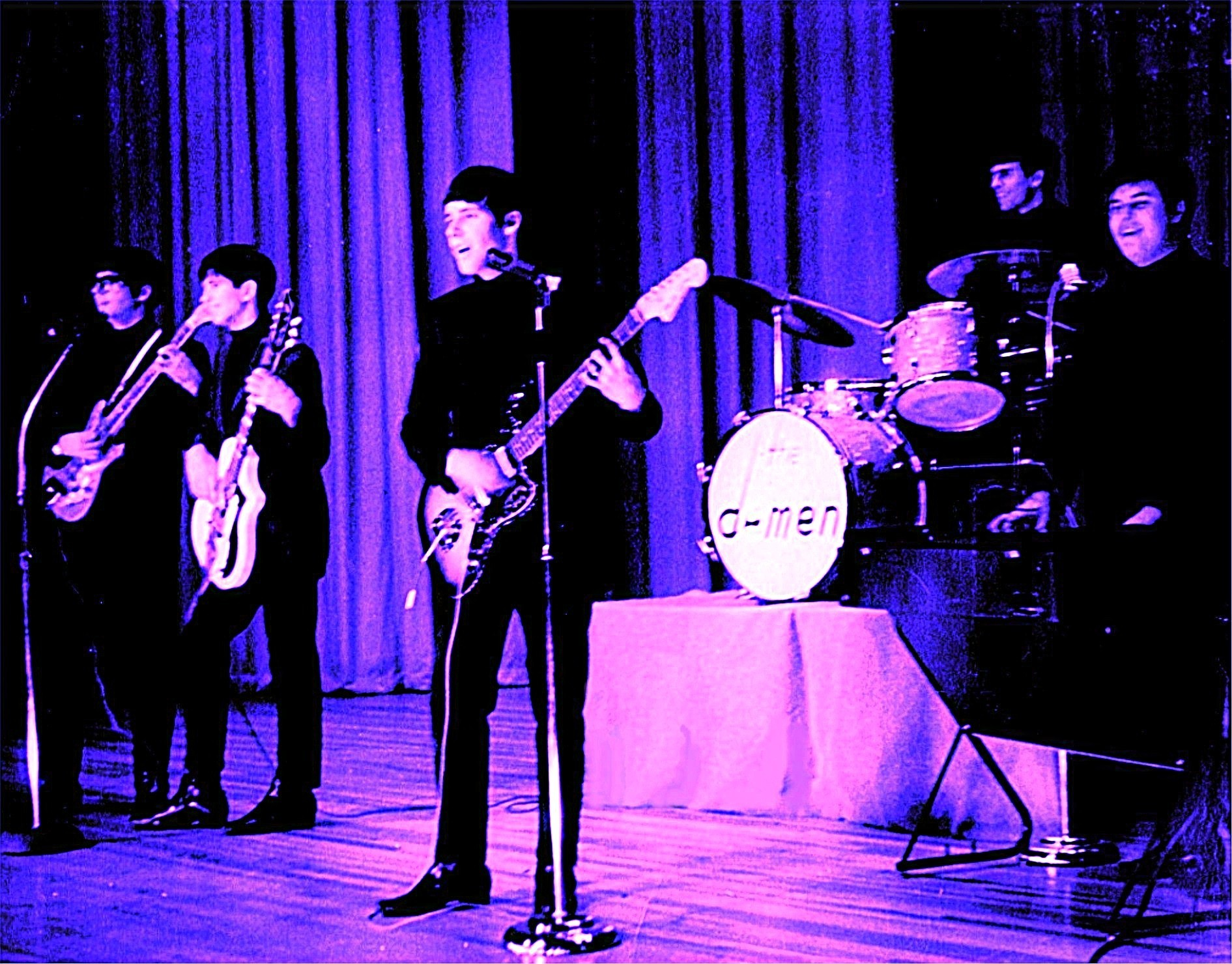
The D-Men (later the Fifth Estate) in 1964

The term "garage rock", often used in reference to 1960s acts, stems from the perception that many performers were young amateurs who rehearsed in the family garage. While numerous bands were made up of middle-class teenagers from the suburbs, others were from rural or urban areas or were composed of professional musicians in their twenties.

Though it is impossible to determine how many garage bands were active in the era, according to various accounts their numbers were extensive and widespread. According to Mark Nobles, it is estimated that between 1964 and 1968 over 180,000 bands formed in the United States, and several thousand US garage acts made records during the era. (Note: On page 49, Markesich mentions that the book's core discography (consisting almost exclusively of US acts) includes approximately 16,000 recordings made by over 4500 groups. Release dates for records generally range from 1963 to 1972 (with several later exceptions), but the vast bulk of the discography is composed of records released between 1964 and 1968).)

Garage bands performed in a variety of venues. Local and regional groups typically played at parties, school dances, and teen clubs. For acts of legal age (and in some cases younger), bars, nightclubs, and college fraternity socials also provided regular engagements. Occasionally, groups had the opportunity to open at shows for famous touring acts. Some garage rock bands went on tour, particularly those better-known, but even more obscure groups sometimes received bookings or airplay beyond their immediate locales. Groups often competed in "battles of the bands", which allowed musicians to gain exposure and a chance to win a prize, such as free equipment or recording time in a local studio. Contests were held, locally, regionally and nationally, and three of the most prestigious national events were held annually by the Tea Council of the US, the Music Circus, and the United States Junior Chamber.

Performances often sounded amateurish, naïve, or intentionally raw, with typical themes revolving around the traumas of high school life and songs about "lying girls" being particularly common. The lyrics and delivery were frequently more aggressive than that of the more established acts of the time, often with nasal, growled, or shouted vocals, sometimes punctuated by shrieks or screams at climactic moments of release. Instrumentation was frequently characterized by basic chord structures played on electric guitars or keyboards often distorted through a fuzzbox, teamed with bass and drums. Guitarists sometimes played using aggressive-sounding bar chords or power chords. Portable organs such as the Farfisa were used frequently and harmonicas and hand-held percussion such as tambourines were not uncommon. Occasionally, the tempo was sped up in passages sometimes referred to as "raveups".

Garage rock acts were diverse in both musical ability and style, ranging from crude and amateurish to near-studio level musicianship. There were also regional variations in flourishing scenes, such as in California and Texas. The north-western states of Idaho, Washington and Oregon had a distinctly recognizable regional sound with bands such as the Sonics and Paul Revere & the Raiders.

== Recognition and classification ==
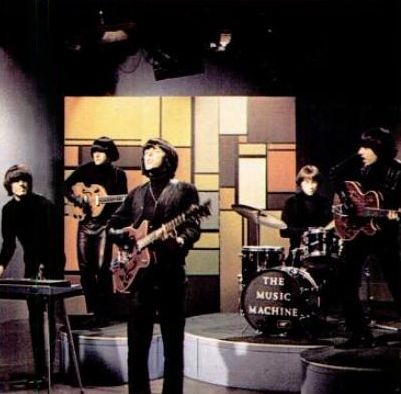
The Music Machine, featuring Sean Bonniwell, in 1966

In the 1960s, garage rock had no name and was not thought of as a genre distinct from other rock and roll of the era. Rock critic and future Patti Smith Group guitarist Lenny Kaye remarked that the period "dashed by so fast that nobody knew much of what to make of it while it was around". In the early 1970s, Kaye and other US rock critics, such as Dave Marsh, Lester Bangs, and Greg Shaw, began to retroactively draw attention to the music, speaking nostalgically of mid-1960s garage bands (and subsequent artists then perceived to be their stylistic inheritors) for the first time as a genre.

"Garage rock" was not the initial name applied to the style. In the early 1970s such critics used the term "punk rock" to characterize it, making it the first musical form to bear the description. While the coinage of the term "punk" in relation to rock music is unknown, it was sometimes used then to describe primitive or rudimentary rock musicianship, (Note: Used in this sense, the term is detectable as early as 1968 in Frank Zappa and the Mothers of Invention's song "Flower Punk", which, amongst other things, parodies amateur musicians and mimics the lyrics of garage rock staple "Hey Joe".) but more specifically 1960s garage as a style. In the May 1971 issue of Creem, Dave Marsh described a performance by ? and the Mysterians as an "exposition of punk rock". Conjuring up the mid-1960s, Lester Bangs in June 1971 wrote, "then punk bands started cropping up who were writing their own songs but taking the Yardbirds' sound and reducing it to this kind of goony fuzztone clatter ... oh, it was beautiful, it was pure folklore, Old America, and sometimes I think those were the best days ever".

Much of the revival of interest in 1960s garage rock can be traced to the release of the 1972 album Nuggets compiled by Lenny Kaye. In the liner notes, Kaye used "punk rock" as a collective term for 1960s garage bands and also "garage-punk" to describe a song recorded in 1966 by the Shadows of Knight. In the January 1973 Rolling Stone review of Nuggets, Greg Shaw commented: "Punk rock is a fascinating genre. ... Punk rock at its best is the closest we came in the 1960s to the original rockabilly spirit of rock & roll." In addition to Rolling Stone and Creem, writings about the genre appeared in various independent "fanzine" publications during the period. In May 1973, Billy Altman launched the short-lived punk magazine, (Note: Letters in title were not capitalized.) which pre-dated the more familiar 1975 publication of the same name, but, unlike the later magazine, was largely devoted to discussion of 1960s garage and psychedelic acts. Greg Shaw's seasonal publication Who Put the Bomp! was influential amongst enthusiasts and collectors of the genre in the early 1970s.

Though the phrase "punk rock" was the favored generic term in the early 1970s, "garage band" was also mentioned in reference to groups. In Rolling Stone in March 1971, John Mendelsohn made an oblique reference to "every last punk teenage garage band having its Own Original Approach". The term "punk rock" was later appropriated by the more commonly-known punk rock movement that emerged in the mid-1970s and is now most commonly applied to groups associated with that movement or who followed in its wake. For the 1960s style, the term "garage rock" came into favor in the 1980s. (Note: The term "garage rock" was used as early as 1977 by Lester Bangs to describe punk band the Dead Boys in an article appearing in the October 24 edition of The Village Voice. Bangs describes the Dead Boys as "classic trashy garage rock". However, it is difficult to determine whether it was used in quite the same generic sense it is now. Bangs' subsequent 1981 essay "Protopunk: The Garage Bands", which appeared in The Rolling Stone Illustrated History of Rock & Roll, does use the term "garage bands" to describe 1960s groups, but not the term "garage rock", indicating that a consensus may not have yet (in 1981) coalesced around the term "garage rock" as the name for the 1960s genre.) According to Mike Markesich: "Initially launched into the underground vernacular at the start of the '80s, the garage tag ... slowly sifted its way amid like-minded fans to finally be recognized as a worthy descriptive replacement". The term "garage punk" has also persisted, and the style has been referred to as "'60s punk" and "proto-punk". "Frat rock" has been used to refer to the R&B- and surf rock- derived garage sounds of certain acts, such as the Kingsmen and others.

== 1958–1964: Origins ==
=== Regional rock & roll, instrumental, and surf ===
In the late 1950s, the initial impact of rock and roll on mainstream American culture waned as major record companies took a controlling influence and sought to market more conventionally acceptable recordings. Electric musical instruments (particularly guitars) and amplification were becoming more affordable, allowing young musicians to form small groups to perform in front of local audiences of their peers; and in some areas there was a breakdown, especially among radio audiences, of traditional black and white markets, with more white teenagers listening to and purchasing R&B records.

Numerous young people were inspired by musicians such as Chuck Berry, Little Richard, Bo Diddley, Jerry Lee Lewis, Buddy Holly, and Eddie Cochran, whose recordings of relatively unsophisticated and hard-driving songs from a few years earlier proclaimed personal independence and freedom from parental controls and conservative norms. Ritchie Valens' 1958 hit "La Bamba" helped jump-start the Chicano rock scene in Southern California and provided a three-chord template for the songs of numerous 1960s garage bands. By the end of the 1950s regional scenes were abundant around the country and helped set the stage for garage rock the 1960s.

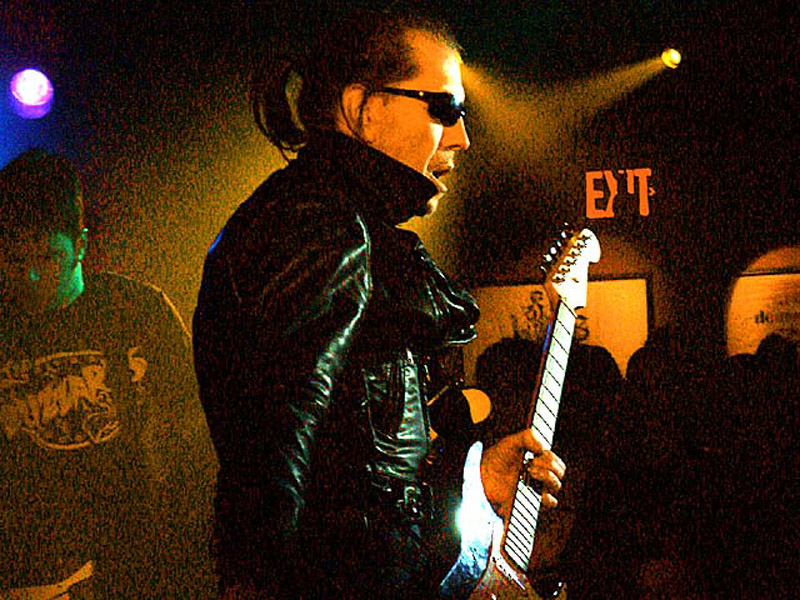
Link Wray, pictured in 1993, who helped pioneer the use of guitar power chords and distortion as early as 1958 with the instrumental "Rumble", has been cited as an early influence on garage rock.

Guitarist Link Wray has been cited as an early influence on garage rock and is known for his innovative use of guitar techniques and effects such as power chords and distortion. He is best known for his 1958 instrumental "Rumble", which featured the sound of distorted, "clanging" guitar chords, which anticipated much of what was to come. The combined influences of early-1960s instrumental rock and surf rock also played significant roles in shaping the sound of garage rock.

Chris Montez — "Let's Dance" (1962)
The 1962 hit "Let's Dance" by Chris Montez, with its use of "cheesy"-sounding Farfisa organ riffs and banging drums, featured stylistic elements that anticipate the garage sound.

According to Lester Bangs, "the origins of garage rock as a genre can be traced to California and the Pacific Northwest in the early Sixties". The Pacific Northwest, which encompasses Washington, Oregon, and Idaho, played a critical role in the inception of garage rock, hosting the first scene to produce a sizable number of acts, and pre-dated the British Invasion by several years. The signature garage sound that eventually emerged in the Pacific Northwest is sometimes referred to as "the Northwest Sound" and had its origins in the late 1950s, when a handful of R&B and rock & roll acts sprang up in various cities and towns in an area stretching from Puget Sound to Seattle and Tacoma, and beyond.

There and elsewhere, groups of teenagers were inspired directly by touring R&B performers such as Johnny Otis and Richard Berry, and began to play cover versions of R&B songs. During the late 1950s and early 1960s other instrumental groups playing in the region, such as the Ventures, formed in 1958 in Tacoma, Washington, who came to specialize in a surf rock sound, and the Frantics from Seattle. The Blue Notes from Tacoma, fronted by "Rockin' Robin" Roberts, were one of the city's first teenage rock & roll bands. The Wailers (often referred to as the Fabulous Wailers) had a national chart hit in 1959, the instrumental "Tall Cool One". After the demise of the Blue Notes, "Rockin' Robin" did a brief stint with the Wailers, and with him on vocals in 1962, they recorded a version of Richard Berry's 1957 song "Louie Louie"—their arrangement became the much-replicated blueprint for practically every band in the region, including Portland's the Kingsmen who went on to achieve a major hit with it the following year.

Other regional scenes of teenage bands playing R&B-oriented rock were well-established in the early 1960s, several years before the British Invasion, in places such as Texas and the Midwest. At the same time, in Southern California surf bands formed, playing raucous guitar- and saxophone-driven instrumentals. Writer Neil Campbell commented: "There were literally thousands of rough-and-ready groups performing in local bars and dance halls throughout the US prior to the arrival of the Beatles ... [T]he indigenous popular music which functioned in this way ... was the proto-punk more commonly identified as garage rock".

=== Frat rock and initial commercial success ===
The Kingsmen – "Louie, Louie" (1963)
"Louie, Louie" was written by Richard Berry and provided a major hit for the Kingsmen.

As a result of cross-pollination between surf rock, hot rod music, and other influences, a new style of rock sometimes referred to as frat rock emerged, which has been mentioned as an early subgenre of garage rock. The Kingsmen's 1963 off-the-cuff version of "Louie Louie" became the de facto "big bang" for three-chord rock, starting as a regional hit in Seattle, then rising to No. 1 on the national charts and eventually becoming a major success overseas. The group unwittingly became the target of an FBI investigation in response to complaints about the song's alleged use of profanity in its nearly indecipherable lyrics.

Though often associated with Pacific Northwest acts such as the Kingsmen, frat rock also thrived elsewhere. In 1963, singles by several regional bands from other parts of the United States began appearing on the national charts, including "Surfin' Bird" by the Trashmen from Minneapolis, which essentially fused together parts from two songs previously recorded by the Rivingtons, "The Bird is the Word" and "Papa Oom Mow Mow". "California Sun" by the Rivieras, from South Bend, Indiana followed, becoming a hit in early 1964. Frat rock persisted into the mid-1960s with acts such as the Swingin' Medallions, who had a top twenty hit with "Double Shot (Of My Baby's Love)" in 1966.

== 1964–1968: Peak years ==
=== Impact of the Beatles and the British Invasion ===
During the mid-1960s, garage rock entered its most active period, prompted by the influence of the Beatles and the British Invasion. On February 9, 1964, during their first visit to the United States, the Beatles made an historic appearance on The Ed Sullivan Show watched by a record-breaking viewing audience of a nation mourning the recent death of President John F. Kennedy. For many, particularly the young, the Beatles' visit re-ignited the sense of excitement and possibility that had momentarily faded in the wake of the assassination. Much of this new excitement was expressed in rock music, often to the chagrin of parents and elders.

In the wake of the Beatles' first visit, a subsequent string of successful British beat groups and acts achieved success in America between 1964 and 1966, often referred to in the US as "the British Invasion". Such acts had a profound impact, leading many (often surf or hot rod groups) to respond by altering their style, and countless new bands to form, as teenagers around the country picked up guitars and started bands by the thousands. In many cases, garage bands were particularly influenced by the increasingly bold sound of a second wave of British groups with a harder, blues-based attack, such as the Kinks, the Who, the Animals, the Yardbirds, Small Faces, the Pretty Things, Them, and the Rolling Stones often resulting in a raw and primitive sound. Numerous acts sometimes characterized as garage rock formed in countries outside North America, such as England's the Troggs. Their 1966 worldwide hit "Wild Thing" became a staple in countless American garage bands' repertoires. By 1965, the influence of the British Invasion prompted folk musicians such as Bob Dylan and members of the Byrds to adopt the use of electric guitars and amplifiers, resulting in what became termed folk rock. The resulting success of Dylan, the Byrds, and other folk rock acts influenced the sound and approach of numerous garage bands.

=== Height of success and airplay ===
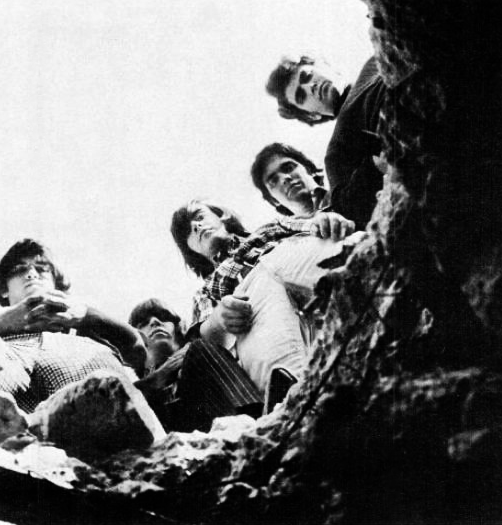
Count Five in 1966

In the wake of the British Invasion, garage rock experienced a boom in popularity. With thousands of garage bands active in the US and Canada, hundreds produced regional hits during the period, often receiving airplay on local AM radio stations. Several acts gained wider exposure just long enough to have one or occasionally more national hits in an era rife with "one-hit wonders". In 1965, the Beau Brummels broke into the national charts with "Laugh, Laugh", followed by "Just a Little". According to Richie Unterberger, they were perhaps the first American group to pose a successful response to the British Invasion. That year, Sam the Sham & the Pharaohs' "Wooly Bully" went to No. 2, and they followed it up a year later with another No. 2 hit, "Little Red Riding Hood". Also in 1965, the Castaways almost reached Billboard's top ten with "Liar, Liar", which was later included on the 1972 Nuggets compilation. Featuring a lead vocal by Rick Derringer, "Hang On Sloopy" became a No. 1 hit for Indiana's the McCoys, topping the Billboard charts in October 1965. They were immediately signed to Bang Records and followed up with another hit in 1966, a cover of "Fever", originally recorded by Little Willie John.

The garage rock boom peaked around 1966. That April, the Outsiders from Cleveland hit No. 5 with "Time Won't Let Me", which was later covered by acts such as Iggy Pop. In July, the Standells from Los Angeles almost made it into the US top ten with "Dirty Water", a song now often associated with Boston. "Psychotic Reaction" by the Count Five went to No. 5 on Billboard's Hot 100 and was later memorialized by Lester Bangs in his 1971 piece "Psychotic Reactions and Carburetor Dung".

Question Mark and the Mysterians – "96 Tears" (1966)
Musicologist Pete Dale notes "96 Tears" as a typical example of 1960s punk, containing a "basic beat, repetitive structure, and a hypnotically simple keyboard part".

"96 Tears" (1966) by Question Mark and the Mysterians, from Saginaw, Michigan, became a No. 1 hit in the US. The song's organ riffs and theme of teenage heartbreak have been mentioned as a landmark recording of the garage rock era and recognized for influencing the works of acts as diverse as the B-52's, the Cramps, and Bruce Springsteen. Two months later, the Music Machine reached the top 20 with fuzz guitar-driven "Talk Talk", whose sound and image that helped pave the way for later acts such as the Ramones. The Syndicate of Sound's "Little Girl", which featured a cocksure half-spoken lead vocal set over chiming 12-string guitar chords, reached No. 8 on the Billboard charts and was later covered by acts such as the Dead Boys, the Banned, and the Chesterfield Kings. In 1965, a Pittsburgh disc jockey discovered "Hanky Panky", a 1964 song by a since-defunct group, the Shondells; the song's belated success revived the career of Tommy James, who assembled a new group under the name Tommy James and the Shondells and produced 12 more top-40 singles. In 1967, Strawberry Alarm Clock emerged from the garage outfit Thee Sixpence and had a No. 1 hit in 1967 with the psychedelic "Incense and Peppermints".

=== Female garage bands ===
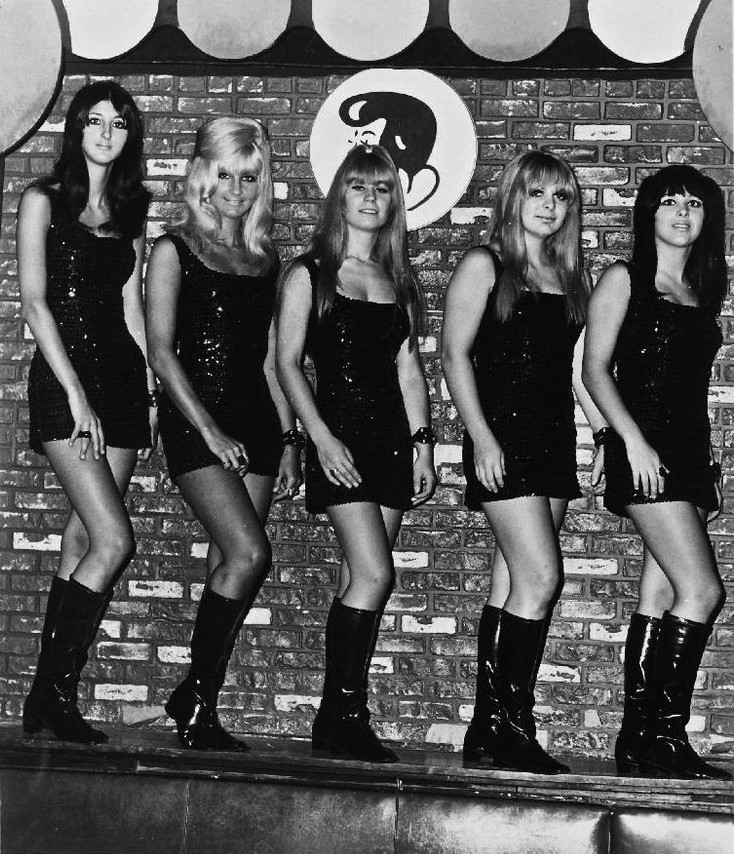
The Pleasure Seekers in 1966 (Suzi Quatro far right)

Garage rock was not an exclusively male phenomenon—it fostered the emergence of all-female bands whose members played their own instruments. One of the first of such acts was New York's Goldie and the Gingerbreads, who appeared at New York's Peppermint Lounge in 1964 and accompanied the Rolling Stones on their American tour the following year. They had a hit in England with a version of "Can't You Hear My Heartbeat". The Continental Co-ets from Fulda, Minnesota, were active from 1963 to 1967 and had a hit in Canada with "I Don't Love You No More". The Pleasure Seekers (later known as Cradle), from Detroit, featured Suzi Quatro and her sisters. Quatro went on to greater fame as a musical solo act and television actress in the 1970s. The Luv'd Ones, also from Michigan, signed with Chicago's Dunwich Records and cut records with a sometimes somber sound, such as "Up Down Sue".

San Francisco's the Ace of Cups became a fixture in the Bay Area scene in the late 1960s. Other notable 1960s female groups were the Daughters of Eve from Chicago, She (previously known as the Hairem) from Sacramento, California, and the Feminine Complex from Nashville, Tennessee. All-female bands were not exclusive to North America. The Liverbirds were a beat group from the Beatles' home city of Liverpool, England, but became best known in Germany, often performing in Hamburg's Star-Club. All-female groups of the 1960s anticipated later acts associated with the 1970s punk movement, such as the Runaways and the Slits.

=== Regional scenes in the United States and Canada ===
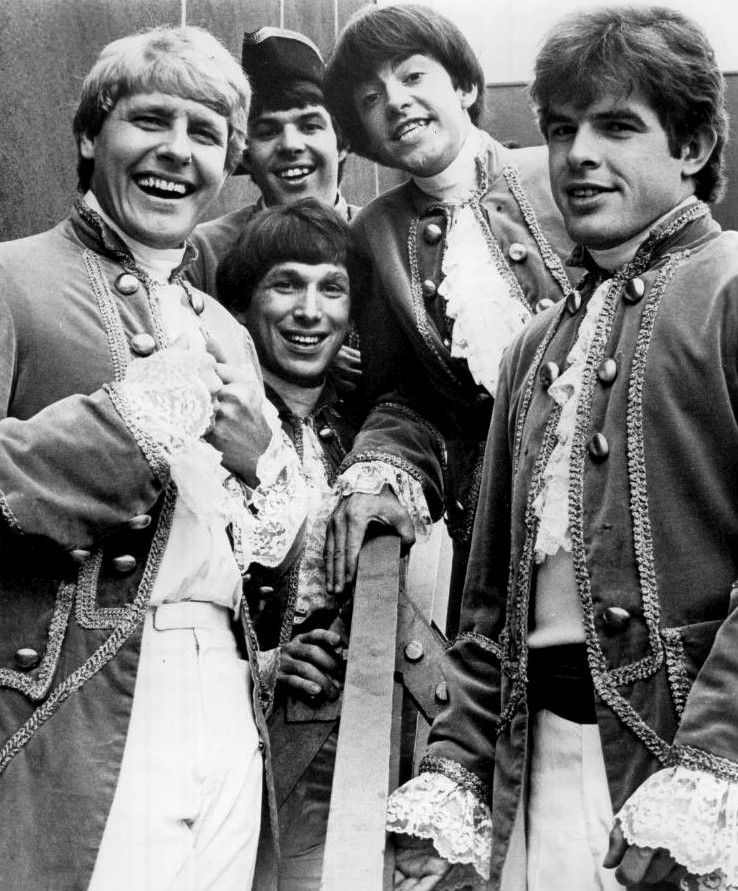
Paul Revere & the Raiders in 1967

==== Pacific Northwest ====
In 1964 and 1965, the impact of the Beatles and the British Invasion shifted the musical landscape, presenting not only a challenge, but also a new impetus, as previously established acts in the Pacific Northwest adapted to the new climate, often reaching greater levels of commercial and artistic success, while scores of new bands formed. After relocating to Portland, Paul Revere & the Raiders in 1963 became the first rock-and-roll act to be signed to Columbia Records, but did not achieve their commercial breakthrough until 1965 with the song "Steppin Out", which was followed by a string of chart-topping hits such as "Just Like Me" (originally recorded by the Wilde Knights) and "Kicks".

The Sonics from Tacoma had a raunchy, hard-driving sound that influenced later acts such as Nirvana and the White Stripes. According to Peter Blecha, they "were the unholy practitioners of punk rock long before anyone knew what to call it". Founded in 1960, they eventually enlisted the services of vocalist Gerry Rosalie and saxophonist Rob Lind and cut their first single, "The Witch", in 1964. The song was re-issued again in 1965, this time with the even more intense "Psycho" on the flip side. They released several albums and are also known for other "high-octane" rockers such as "Cinderella" and "He's Waitin'". Prompted by the Sonics, the Wailers entered the mid-1960s with a harder-edged sound in the fuzz-driven "Hang Up" and "Out of Our Tree".

==== New England and Mid-Atlantic ====
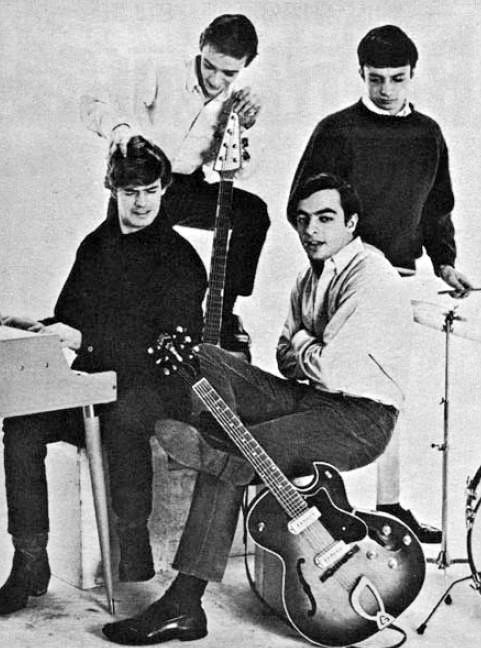
The Remains in 1966

The Barbarians from Cape Cod, wearing sandals and long hair and cultivating an image of "noble savages", recorded an album and several singles, such as "Are You a Boy or Are You a Girl". In 1964, the group appeared on the T.A.M.I. Show on same bill as the Rolling Stones and James Brown. In the film of the show, their drummer, Victor "Moulty" Moulton, is seen holding one of his drumsticks with a prosthetic clamp while playing—the result of a previous accident in which he lost his left hand. In 1966, Moulton recorded "Moulty", a spoken monologue set to music, in which he recounted the travails of his disfigurement, released under the Barbarians' name, but backed by future members of the Band.

Boston's the Remains (sometimes called Barry & the Remains), led by Barry Tashian, became one of the region's most popular bands and, in addition to issuing five singles and a self-titled album, toured with the Beatles in 1966. Also from Boston, the Rockin' Ramrods released the distortion-driven "She Lied" in 1964, which Rob Fitzpatrick called "a truly spectacular piece of proto-punk, the sort of perfect blend of melody and aggression that the Ramones would go on to transform the planet with a dozen or more years later". The Bosstown Sound psychedelic rock scene of the late 1960s largely grew out of the mid-1960s Boston garage scene.

The Squires from Bristol, Connecticut, issued a song now regarded as a garage rock classic, "Going All the Way". Garage rock flourished up and down the Atlantic coast, with acts such as the Vagrants, from Long Island, and Richard and the Young Lions from Newark, New Jersey, and the Blues Magoos from the Bronx, who got their start in New York's Greenwich Village scene and had a hit in 1966 with "(We Ain't Got) Nothin' Yet", which appeared on their debut album, Psychedelic Lollipop, along with a lengthy rendition of the Nashville Teens' "Tobacco Road".

==== California ====
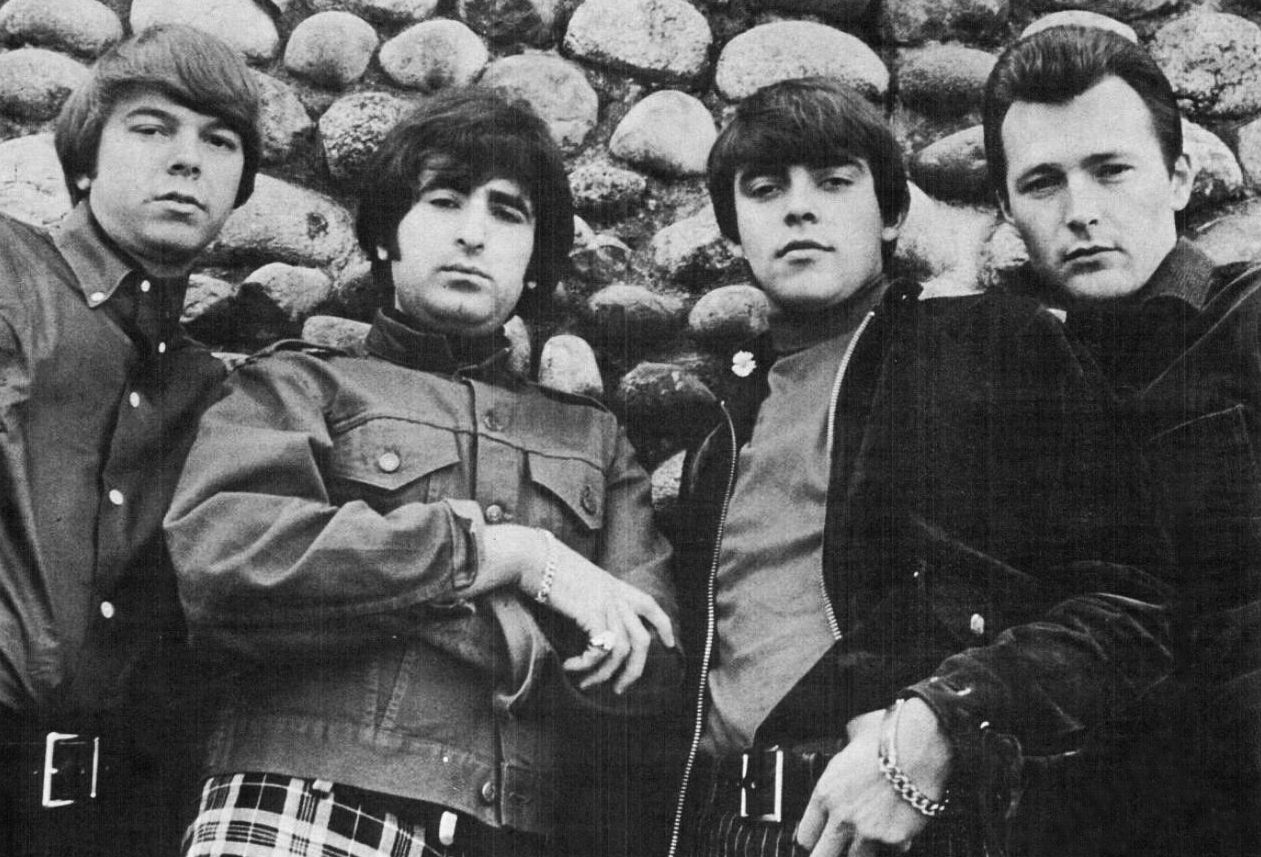
The Standells in 1965

The garage craze came into full swing in California, particularly in Los Angeles. The Sunset Strip was the center of L.A. nightlife, providing bands with high-profile venues to attract a larger following and possibly capture the attention of record labels looking to sign a new act. Exploitation films such as Riot on Sunset Strip and Mondo Hollywood (both released in 1967) captured the musical and social milieu of life on the strip. In Riot on Sunset Strip, several bands make appearances at the Pandora's Box music venue, including the Standells, who are seen during the opening credits performing the theme song, and San Jose's the Chocolate Watchband. The Seeds and the Leaves were favorites with the "in-crowd" and achieved national hits with songs that have come to be regarded as garage classics: the Seeds with "Pushin' Too Hard" and the Leaves with their version of "Hey Joe", which became a staple in countless bands' repertoires.

Love, a racially integrated band headed by African-American musician Arthur Lee, was one of the most popular bands in the scene. Their propulsive 1966 proto-punk anthem "7 and 7 Is" was another song often covered by other groups. The Music Machine, led by Sean Bonniwell, employed innovative musical techniques, sometimes building their own custom-made fuzzboxes. Their first album (Turn On) The Music Machine featured the hit "Talk Talk". The Electric Prunes were one of the more successful garage bands to incorporate psychedelic influences into their sound, such as in the hit "I Had Too Much to Dream (Last Night)", whose opening featured a buzzing fuzz-toned guitar, and which appeared on their self titled debut LP. Garage rock was also present in the Latino community of East L.A. The Premiers, who had a hit in 1964 with "Farmer John", and Thee Midniters are considered prominent figures in Chicano rock, as are the San Diego–based Cannibal & the Headhunters, who had a hit with Chris Kenner's "Land of a Thousand Dances".

San Jose and the South Bay area had a bustling scene featuring the Chocolate Watchband, the Count Five, and the Syndicate of Sound. The Chocolate Watchband released several singles in 1967, including "Are You Gonna Be There (at the Love In)", which was also featured on their debut album No Way Out. The album's opening cut was a rendition of "Let's Talk About Girls", previously recorded by the Tongues of Truth (aka the Grodes).

==== Midwest ====
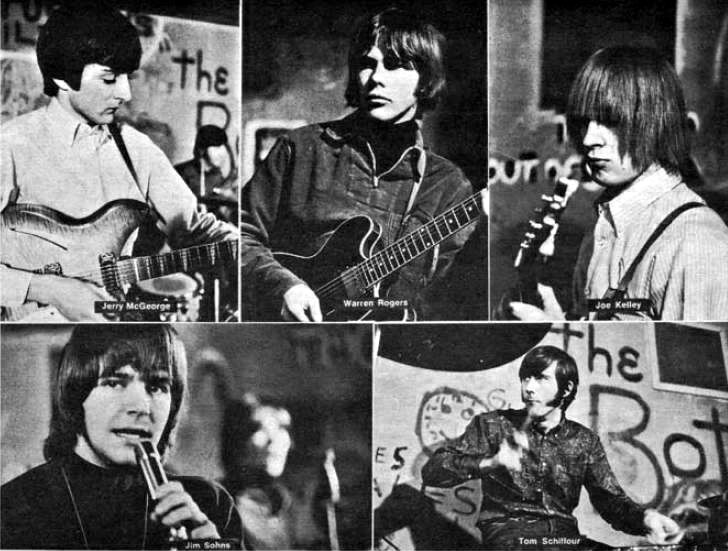
The Shadows of Knight in 1966

Chicago, known for electric blues, continued to have a strong recording industry in the 1960s and was also a hotbed of activity for garage rock. Chicago blues as well as the Rolling Stones, the Pretty Things, and the Yardbirds influenced the Shadows of Knight, who recorded for Dunwich Records and were known for a tough, hard-driving sound. In 1966 they had hits with versions of Them's Van Morrison-penned "Gloria" and Bo Diddley's "Oh Yeah", and also released the aggressive "I'm Gonna Make You Mine", which Mike Stax remarked "was recorded live in the studio with the amps cranked beyond distortion, this is 60s punk at its sexually charged, aggressive best." Also recording for Dunwich were the Del-Vetts and the Banshees, who released the cathartic "Project Blue". Other notable Chicago acts were the Little Boy Blues and the New Colony Six.

Michigan had one of the largest scenes in the country. In early 1966, Detroit's MC5 released a version of "I Can Only Give You Everything" before they went on to greater success at the end of the decade. The Unrelated Segments recorded a string of songs beginning with local hit "The Story Of My Life", followed by "Where You Gonna Go". In 1966, the Litter from Minneapolis released the guitar-overdriven "Action Woman", a song which Michael Hann described as "one of garage's gnarliest, snarliest, most tight-trousered pieces of hormonal aggression".

==== Other US Regions ====
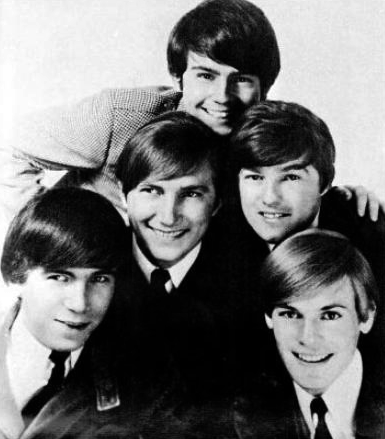
The Five Americans from Oklahoma had a hit with "Western Union" in 1967.

In Texas, the 13th Floor Elevators, from Austin, featured Roky Erickson on guitar and vocals and are considered one of the prominent bands of the era. They had a regional hit with "You're Gonna Miss Me" and a string of albums, but the band was hampered by drug busts and related legal problems that hastened their demise. Richie Unterberger singled out the Zakary Thaks, from Corpus Christi, for their songwriting skills, and they are best known for the frantic and sped-up "Bad Girl". The Moving Sidewalks, from Houston, featured Billy Gibbons on guitar, later of ZZ Top. The Gentlemen from Dallas cut the fuzz-driven "It's a Cry'n Shame", which in Mike Markesich's Teenbeat Mayhem is ranked as one of the top two garage rock songs of all time, second only to "You're Gonna Miss Me", by the 13th Floor Elevators. The Outcasts from San Antonio cut two highly regarded songs, "I'm in Pittsburgh and It's Raining", which became a local hit, and "1523 Blair", that Jason Ankeny described as "Texas psychedelia at its finest".

The Five Americans were from Durant, Oklahoma, and released a string of singles, such as "Western Union", which became a top 10 US hit in 1967. From Phoenix, Arizona, the Spiders featured Vincent Furnier, later known as Alice Cooper, and eventually adopted that name as the group's moniker. As the Spiders they recorded two singles, most notably "Don't Blow Your Mind", which became a local hit in Phoenix in 1966. The group ventured to Los Angeles in 1967 in hopes of achieving greater success, however they found it not there, but while in Detroit several years later, re-christened as Alice Cooper.

From Florida, Orlando's We the People came about as the result of the merger of two previous bands and featured songwriters Tommy Talton and Wayne Proctor. They recorded a string of self-composed songs, such as primitive rockers, "You Burn Me Up and Down" and "Mirror of Your Mind", as well as the esoteric "In the Past", later covered by the Chocolate Watchband. Evil, from Miami, had a hard, sometimes thrashing sound and a reputation for musical mayhem, typified in songs such as "From a Curbstone" and "I'm Movin' On".

==== Canada, islands, and territories ====
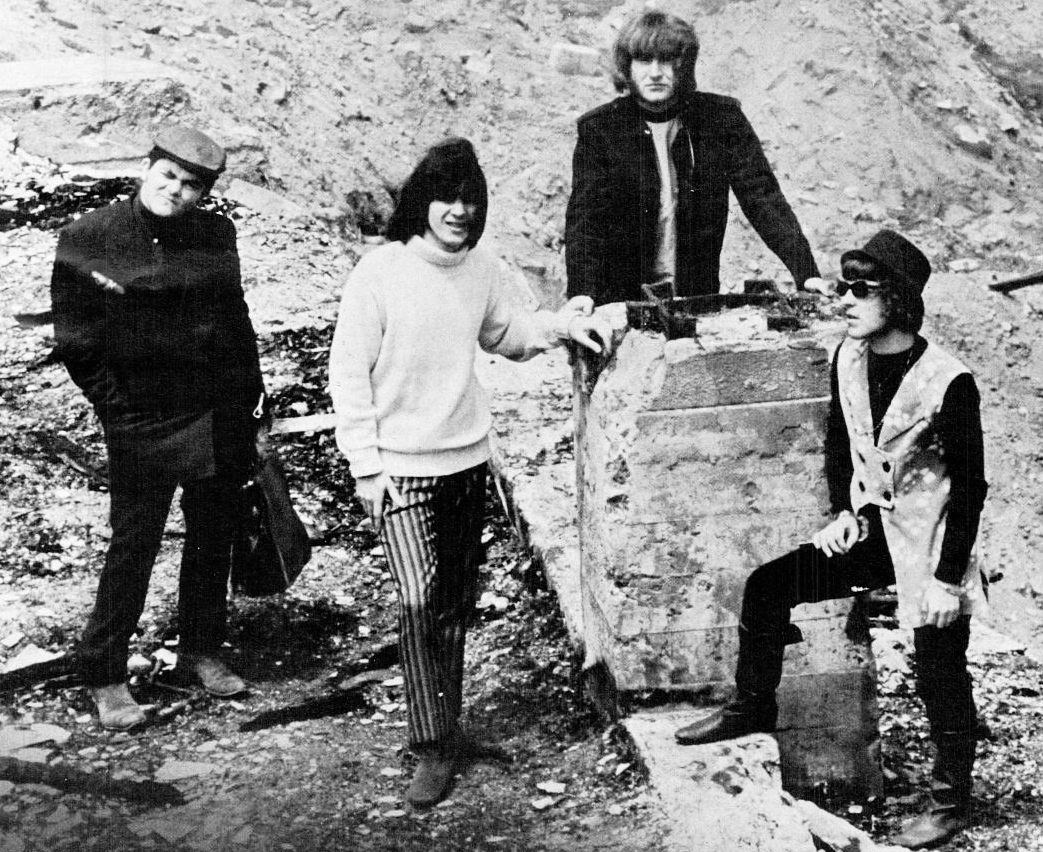
The Paupers in 1967

Like the United States, Canada experienced a large and vigorous garage rock movement. Vancouver's the Northwest Company, who recorded "Hard to Cry", had a power chord-driven approach. The Painted Ship were known for primal songs such as the angst-ridden "Frustration" and "Little White Lies", which Stansted Montfichet called a "punk classic". Chad Allan and the Reflections from Winnipeg, Manitoba, began in 1962 and had a hit in the mid-1960s, Johnny Kidd & the Pirates' "Shakin' All Over", then went on to greater success in the late 1960s and early 1970s as the Guess Who.

In 1966, the Ugly Ducklings from Toronto had a hit with "Nothin'" and toured with the Rolling Stones. The Haunted from Montreal specialized in a gritty blues-based sound influenced by the Rolling Stones and released the single "1–2–5". Two other bands from Toronto were the Paupers and the Mynah Birds. The Paupers released several singles and two albums. The Mynah Birds featured the combination of Rick James on lead vocals and Neil Young on guitar, who both went on to fame as solo acts, as well as Bruce Palmer who later accompanied Young to California to join Buffalo Springfield in 1966. They signed a contract with Motown Records and recorded several songs including "It's My Time".

Outside of the mainland, garage rock became a fixture in the islands and territories adjacent to the continent. The Savages from Bermuda recorded the album Live 'n Wild, which features "The World Ain't Round It's Square", an angry song of youthful defiance.

=== Variants in regions outside of the US and Canada ===
The garage phenomenon, though most often associated with North America, was not exclusive to it. As part of the international beat trend of the 1960s, other countries developed grass-roots rock movements that closely mirrored what was happening in North America, which have sometimes been characterized as variants of garage rock or as closely related forms.

==== United Kingdom ====
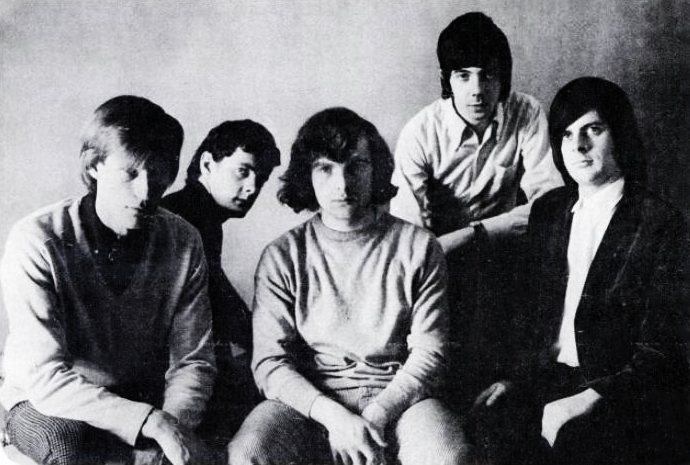
Them, featuring Van Morrison (center), in 1965

Although Britain did not develop a distinct garage rock genre in the same way as the United States, many British beat groups shared important characteristics with the American bands who often attempted to emulate them, and the music of certain UK acts has been mentioned in particular relation to garage.

Beat music emerged in Britain in the early 1960s, as musicians who originally came together to play rock and roll or skiffle assimilated American rhythm and blues influences. The genre provided the model for the format of many later rock groups. The Liverpool area had a particularly high concentration of acts and venues, and the Beatles emerged from this thriving music scene. In London and elsewhere, certain groups developed a harder-driving, distinctively British blues style. Nationally popular blues- and R&B- influenced beat groups included the Rolling Stones and the Yardbirds from London, the Animals from Newcastle, and Them, from Belfast, Northern Ireland, featuring Van Morrison.

Coinciding with the "British Invasion" of the US, a musical cross-fertilization developed between the two continents. In their 1964 transatlantic hits "You Really Got Me" and "All Day and All of the Night", the Kinks took the influence of the Kingsmen's version of "Louie Louie" and applied greater volume and distortion, which in turn, influenced the approach of many American garage bands. With Van Morrison, Them recorded two songs widely covered by American garage bands: "Gloria", which became a big hit for Chicago's the Shadows of Knight, and "I Can Only Give You Everything". Keith Richards's use of fuzz distortion in the Rolling Stones' 1965 hit "(I Can't Get No) Satisfaction" affected the sound of countless American garage bands. Also influential were the Pretty Things and the Downliners Sect, both of whom were known for a particularly raw approach to blues-influenced rock that has sometimes been compared to garage.

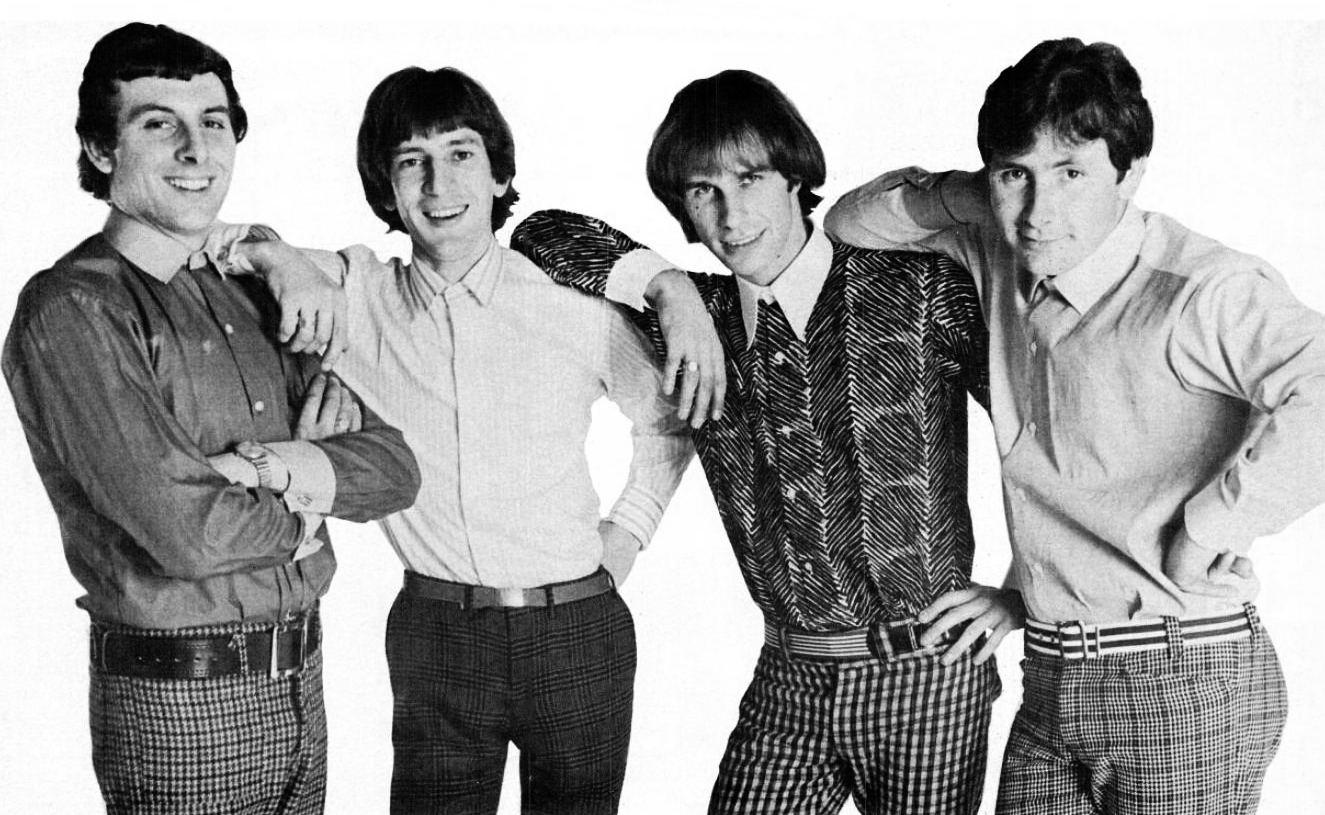
The Troggs in 1966

By 1965, bands such as the Who and the Small Faces tailored their appeal to the mod subculture centered in London. Some of the harder-driving and more obscure bands associated with the mod scene in the UK are sometimes referred to as Freakbeat, which is sometimes viewed as a more stylish British equivalent of garage rock. Several bands often mentioned as Freakbeat are the Creation, the Action, the Move, the Smoke, the Sorrows, and Wimple Winch.

Some commentators have branded the Troggs as garage rock. Extolling the virtues of their seemingly unrepentant primitivism and sexually charged innuendo, in 1971 Lester Bangs memorialized the Troggs as a quintessential "punk" [i.e. garage] band of the 1960s. They had a worldwide hit in 1966 with "Wild Thing", written by American Chip Taylor. The Equals, a racially integrated band from North London whose membership included guitarist Eddy Grant, later a popular solo artist, specialized in an upbeat style of rock—their 1966 recording "Baby Come Back" was a hit in Europe before becoming a British number one in 1968.

==== Continental Europe ====
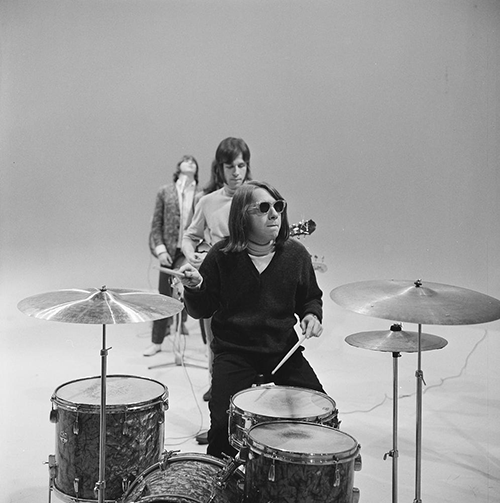
Q65 in 1967

The beat boom swept through continental Europe, resulting in the emergence of national movements sometimes cited as European variants of garage rock. The Netherlands had one of the largest scenes, sometimes retroactively described as Nederbeat. From Amsterdam, the Outsiders, who Richie Unterberger singled out as one of the most important 1960s rock acts from a non-English speaking country, featured Wally Tax on lead vocals and specialized in an eclectic R&B and folk-influenced style. Q65 from the Hague had a diverse but primitive sound, particularly on their early records. Also from the Hague, the Golden Earrings, who later gained international fame in the 1970s and 1980s as Golden Earring, had a top ten hit in the Netherlands in 1965 with "Please Go", followed by "That Day", which went to number two on the Dutch charts.

Having nurtured the Beatles' early development in Hamburg, Germany was well-positioned to play a key role as beat music overtook the continent. Bands from Britain and around Europe traveled there to gain exposure, playing in clubs and appearing on popular German television shows such as Beat Club and Beat! Beat! Beat! The Lords, founded in 1959, pre-dated the British Invasion by several years, and adapted their sound and look to reflect the influence of the British groups, even singing in English, but providing a comic twist. The Rattles from Hamburg also had a lengthy history, but were more serious in their approach. There were numerous bands active in Spain, such as Los Bravos, who had a worldwide hit with "Black Is Black", as well as los Cheyenes and others.

==== Latin America ====
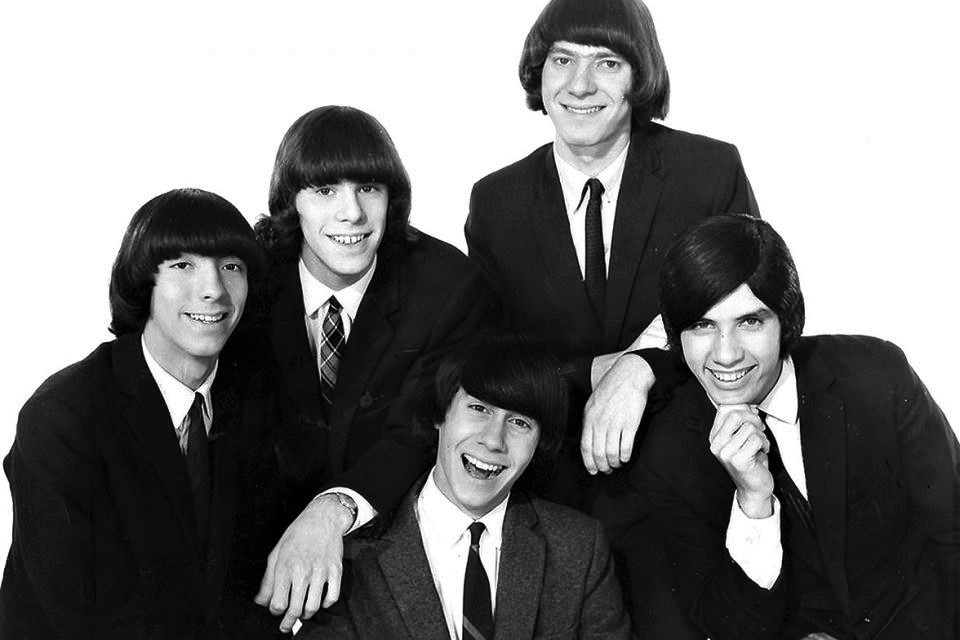
Los Mockers, from Uruguay, in 1965

Latin America got swept up in the worldwide beat trend and developed several of its own national scenes. Mexico experienced its own equivalent to North American garage. The nation's proximity to the United States was detectable in the raw sounds produced by a number of groups while the country simultaneously embraced the British Invasion. One of Mexico's most popular acts were Los Dug Dug's, who recorded several albums and stayed active well into the 1970s.

The beat boom flourished in Uruguay during the mid-1960s in a period sometimes referred to as the Uruguayan Invasion. Two of the best-known acts were Los Shakers and Los Mockers. In Peru, Los Saicos were one of the first bands to gain national prominence. Their 1965 song "¡Demolición!" with its humorously anarchistic lyrics was a huge hit in Peru. About them Phil Freeman noted, "These guys were a punk rock band, even if nobody outside Lima knew it at the time". Los Yorks became one of Peru's leading groups. Colombia hosted bands such Los Speakers and Los Flippers from Bogotá, Los Yetis from Medellín. Los Gatos Salvajes, who came from Rosario, Argentina, were one of the country's first beat groups, and two of their members went on to form Los Gatos, a popular act in Argentina during the late 1960s.

==== Asia ====
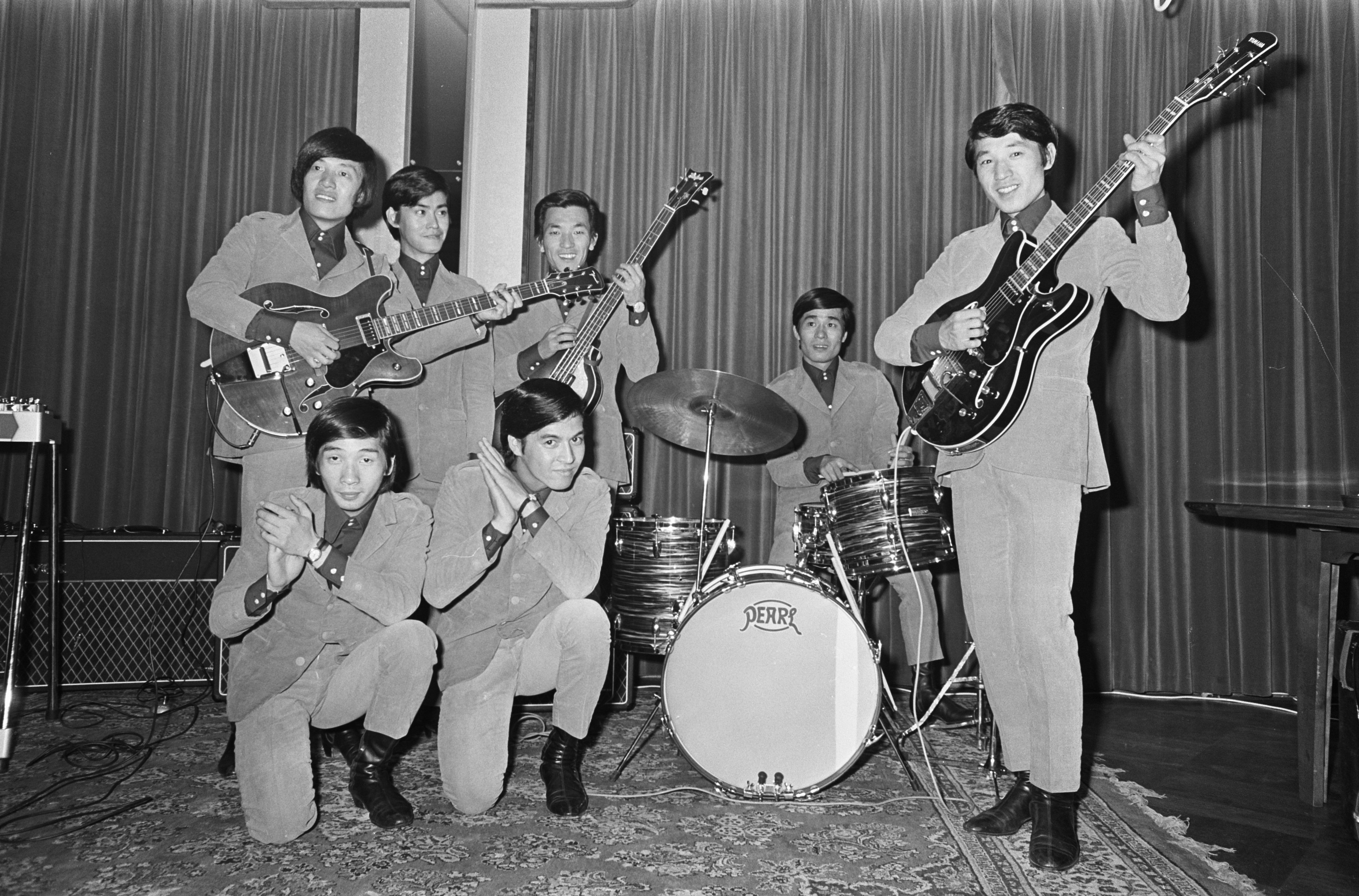
The Spiders in 1966

The Far East was not immune to the beat craze, and Japan was no exception; this was particularly true after the Beatles' 1966 visit, when they played five shows at Tokyo's Budokan arena. The popular 1960s beat/garage movement in Japan is often referred to as Group Sounds (or GS). The Spiders (Note: Not to be confused with Alice Cooper's American band of the same name.) were one of the better-known groups. Other notable bands were the Golden Cups and the Tigers.

Despite famine, economic hardship, and political instability, India experienced its own proliferation of garage bands in the 1960s, persisting into the early 1970s with the 1960s musical style still intact even after it fallen out of favor elsewhere. (Note: On pages 10 and 51 the author indicates that the term often used for many the Indian bands of the 1960s is "garage bands".) Mumbai, with its hotels, clubs, and nightlife, had a bustling music scene. The Jets, who were active from 1964 to 1966, were perhaps the first beat group to become popular there. Also popular in Mumbai were the Trojans, featuring Biddu, originally from Bangalore, who later moved to London and become a solo act. Every year the annual Simla Beat Contest was held in Bombay by the Imperial Tobacco Company. Groups from all over India, such as the Fentones and Velvet Fogg, competed in the event.

==== Australia and New Zealand ====
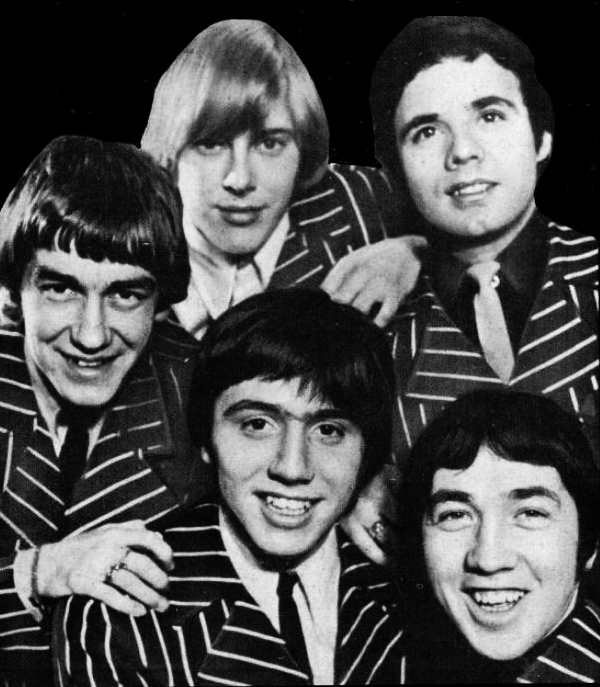
The Easybeats in 1966

Australia and New Zealand experienced a garage/beat explosion in the mid-1960s. Before the British Invasion hit, the region enjoyed a sizable surf rock scene, with popular bands such as the Atlantics, who had several instrumental hits, as well as the Aztecs and the Sunsets. In late 1963 and early 1964 British Invasion influence began to permeate the music scenes there. In June 1964 the Beatles visited Australia as part of their world tour and were greeted by a crowd of an estimated 300,000 in Adelaide. In response, many prior Australian surf bands adapted by adding vocals over guitars, and a host of new bands formed. The first wave of British-inspired bands tended towards the pop-oriented sound of the Merseybeat. With rise in popularity of bands such as the Rolling Stones and the Animals, a second wave of Australian bands emerged that favored a harder, blues-influenced approach.

Sydney was the host to numerous acts. The Atlantics switched to a vocal rock format and brought in veteran singer Johnny Rebb, formerly with Johnny Rebb and His Rebels. "Come On" was their best-known song from this period. The Easybeats, featuring vocalist Stevie Wright and guitarist George Young, the older brother of Angus and Malcolm Young of the later hard rock group AC/DC, became the most popular group in Australia during the mid-1960s. One of Sydney's most notorious acts was the Missing Links, who throughout 1965 went through a complete and total lineup change between the release their first single in March and on the subsequent releases later that year, such as the primitivist anthems "Wild About You", as well as their self-titled LP. In 1966, the Throb had a hit in Australia with their version of "Fortune Teller", and later that year released "Black", a brooding version of a traditional folk ballad noted for its expressionistic use of guitar feedback. The Black Diamonds' "I Want, Need, Love You" featured an intense and hard-driving guitar sound that Ian D. Marks described as "speaker cone-shredding".

From Brisbane came the Pleazers and the Purple Hearts, and from Melbourne the Pink Finks, the Loved Ones, Steve and the Board, and the Moods. Like Sydney's the Missing Links, the Creatures were another notorious group of the period, who Iain McIntyre remarked "Thanks to their brightly coloured hair and bad-ass attitude, the Creatures left in their wake a legacy of multiple arrests, bloodied noses and legendary rave ups". The Masters Apprentices' early sound was largely R&B-influenced garage and psychedelic.

From New Zealand, the Bluestars cut the defiant "Social End Product", aimed at social oppression much in the manner of 1970s punk rock acts. Chants R&B were known for a raw R&B-influenced sound. The La De Da's recorded a version of the Changin' Times' "How is the Air Up There?", which went to No. 4 on the nation's charts.

=== Integration with psychedelia and counterculture ===
==== Historical and cultural associations ====
Increasingly throughout 1966, partly due to the growing influence of drugs such as marijuana and LSD, numerous bands began to expand their sound, sometimes employing eastern scales and various sonic effects to achieve exotic and hypnotic soundscapes in their music. The development was nonetheless the result of a longer musical evolution growing out of folk rock and other forms, and prefigured even in certain surf rock recordings. (Note: The title of the Gamblers' 1960 instrumental "LSD-25" mentions LSD, and in "Miserlou" (1962), Dick Dale used a Phrygian scale. The first musical act to use the term "psychedelic was the New York-based folk group the Holy Modal Rounders on their version of Lead Belly's "Hesitation Blues" (there pronounced as "psycho-delic") in 1964.) As the decade progressed, psychedelic influences became pervasive in much garage rock.

Count Five – "Psychotic Reaction" (1966)
"Psychotic Reaction" by the Count Five contains characteristics that came to typify much psychedelic and acid rock, such as the use of fuzz and feedback, as opposed to the clean guitar sounds prevalent in early rock.

By the mid-1960s, numerous garage bands began to employ tone-altering devices such as fuzzboxes on guitars often for the purpose of enhancing the music's sonic palate, adding an aggressive edge with loudly amplified instruments to create a barrage of "clanging" sounds, in many cases expressing anger, defiance, and sexual frustration. The genre came into its peak of popularity at a time when a collective sense of discontent and alienation crept into the psyche of the youth in the United States and elsewhere—even in the largely conservative suburban communities which produced so many garage bands. Garage bands, though generally apolitical, nonetheless reflected the attitudes and tenor of the times. Nightly news reports had a cumulative effect on the mass consciousness, including musicians. Detectable in much of the music from this era is a disparate array of raw sounds and emotions, coinciding with surrounding events, such as the assassinations of major political figures and the ongoing escalation of troops sent to Vietnam, yet certain commentators have also noted an apparent bygone innocence as part of the style's appeal to later generations.

In 1965, the influence of artists such as Bob Dylan, who moved beyond political protest by experimenting with abstract and surreal lyrical imagery and switched to electric guitar, became increasingly pervasive across the musical landscape, affecting a number of genres, including garage rock. The members of garage bands, like so many musicians of the 1960s, were part of a generation that was largely born into the paradigm and customs of an older time, but grew up confronting a new set of issues facing a more advanced and technological age. Postwar prosperity brought the advantages of better education, as well as more spare time for recreation, which along with the new technology, made it possible for an increasing number of young people to play music. With the advent of television, nuclear weapons, civil rights, the Cold War, and space exploration, the new generation was more global in its mindset and began to conceive of a higher order of human relations, attempting to reach for a set of transcendent ideals, often expressed through rock music. Though set to a backdrop of tragic events that proved increasingly disillusioning, various forms of personal and musical experimentation held promise, at least for a time, in the minds of many. While opening boundaries and testing the frontiers of what the new world had to offer, 1960s youth ultimately had to accept the limitations of the new reality, yet often did so while experiencing the ecstasy of a moment when the realm of the infinite seemed possible and within reach. (Note: Commenting on the 1960s youth generation, as well as garage bands, Lenny Kaye mentions in his liner notes to Nuggets (1972): "The social situation similarly set the pace, doing its part by opening once rigid-boundaries of individual musics — folk, jazz, more exotic foreign forms — as well as cracking open the door to a world in which the youth felt that they had too long suffered a pat on the head ad a kick in the ass. Lastly you might take into account the players and audiences themselves, nurtured on a steady diet of rock for as long as they could remember, the former sure that a piece of plutonian pie could easily be theirs by as simple act of faith as picking up a guitar...")

==== Garage-psych ====
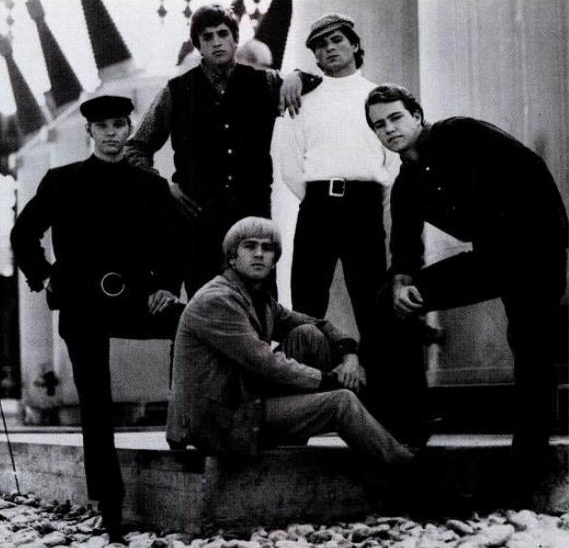
The Electric Prunes in 1966

Tapping into the psychedelic zeitgeist, musicians sonically pushed barriers and explored new horizons. Garage acts, while generally lacking the budgetary means to produce musical extravaganzas on the scale of the Beatles' Sgt. Pepper's Lonely Hearts Club Band or the instrumental virtuosity of acts such as Jimi Hendrix or Cream, nonetheless managed to infuse esoteric elements into basic primitive rock. The 13th Floor Elevators from Austin, Texas, are usually thought to be first band to use the term "psychedelic"—in their promotional literature in early 1966. They also used it in the title of their debut album released in November, The Psychedelic Sounds of the 13th Floor Elevators. In August 1966, the Deep traveled from New York to Philadelphia to record a set of hallucinogenic songs for the album Psychedelic Moods: A Mind-Expanding Phenomena, released in October 1966, one month before the 13th Floor Elevators' debut album, and whose all-night sessions produced mind-expanding stream of consciousness ramblings. Other notable bands that incorporated psychedelia into garage rock were the Electric Prunes, the Music Machine, the Blues Magoos, Count Five, and the Chocolate Watchband. Garage rock helped lay the groundwork for the acid rock of the late 1960s.

==== Primitivist avant-garde acts ====
Certain acts conveyed a world view markedly removed from the implicit innocence of much psychedelia and suburban garage, often infusing their work with subversive political or philosophical messages, dabbling in experimental musical forms and concepts considered at the time to be decidedly out of the mainstream. Such artists shared certain characteristics with the garage bands in their use of primitivistic instrumentation and arrangements, while displaying psychedelic rock's affinity for exploration—creating more urbanized, intellectual, and avant garde forms of primitivist rock, sometimes characterized as variants of garage rock. New York City was the home to several such groups. The Fugs, who formed in 1963, were one of rock's first experimental bands and its core members were singer, poet, and social activist Ed Sanders, along with Tuli Kupferberg and Ken Weaver. They specialized in a satirical mixture of amateurish garage rock, jug, folk, and psychedelic laced with leftist political commentary. In a 1970 interview, Ed Sanders became the first known musician to describe his music as "punk rock".

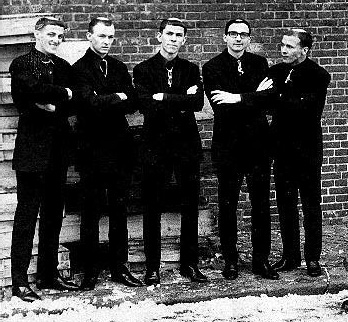
The Monks' music imbued garage rock with avant-garde elements.

The Velvet Underground, whose roster included Lou Reed, are now generally considered the foremost experimental rock group of the period. At the time of recording their first album, they were involved with Andy Warhol, who produced some its tracks, and his assemblage of "scenesters" at the Factory, including model-turned-singer Nico. She shared billing with them on the resulting album, The Velvet Underground & Nico. The album's lyrics, though generally apolitical, depict the world of hard drugs in songs such as "I'm Waiting for the Man" and "Heroin", and other topics considered taboo at the time. Other New York acts included Henry Flynt's the Insurrections as well as the Godz and Cromagnon.

Outside of New York were the Monks from Germany, whose members were former US servicemen who chose to remain in Germany, where in 1965 they developed an experimental sound on their album Black Monk Time. The group, who sometimes wore habits and medieval tonsures, specialized in a style featuring chanting, electrified six-string banjos and repetitive percussion. In the 1970s, the term "avant-garage" was later coined by singer and songwriter David Thomas to describe the music of his band Pere Ubu.

=== Decline ===
Even at the height of garage rock's popularity in the mid-1960s, the success of most of its records, in spite of a handful of notable exceptions, was relegated to local and regional markets. In the wake of psychedelia, as rock music became increasingly sophisticated, garage rock began to fade. After the release of Sgt. Pepper's Lonely Hearts Club Band and other late-1960s big-production spectaculars, rock albums became increasingly elaborate and were expected to display a high level of maturity and complexity, while the 45-RPM single ceded to the long-play album as the preferred medium.

Album-oriented FM radio stations (Note: Progressive rock and AOR are two examples of FM rock radio formats that became prominent in the late 1960 and 1970s.) eventually overtook AM radio in popularity, and as the large major-label record companies became more powerful and less willing to sign new acts, the once plentiful local and regional independent labels of the mid-1960s began to fold. Radio playlists became more regimented and disc jockeys began to have less freedom, making it increasingly difficult for local and regional bands to receive airplay. Teen clubs and dance venues which previously served as reliable and steady engagements for young groups started to close. The garage sound disappeared at both the national and local level, as band members graduated and departed for college, work, or the military. Musicians in bands frequently faced the prospect of the Vietnam War draft, and many were selected for service. Some died in action. With the tumultuous political events of 1968, the tense mood of the country reached a breaking point, while increasing use of drugs and other factors intermingled with shifting musical tastes. New styles either evolved out of garage rock or replaced it, such as acid rock, progressive rock, heavy metal, country rock, and bubblegum. By 1969 the garage rock phenomenon had largely run its course.

== Later developments ==
=== 1969–1975: Garage-based proto-punk ===
Though the garage rock boom faded at the end of the 1960s, a handful of maverick acts carried its impetus into the next decade, seizing on the style's rougher edges, while brandishing them with increased volume and aggression. Such acts, often retroactively described as "proto-punk", worked in a variety of rock genres and came from various places, most notably Michigan, and specialized in music that was often loud, but more primitive than the typical hard rock of the time.

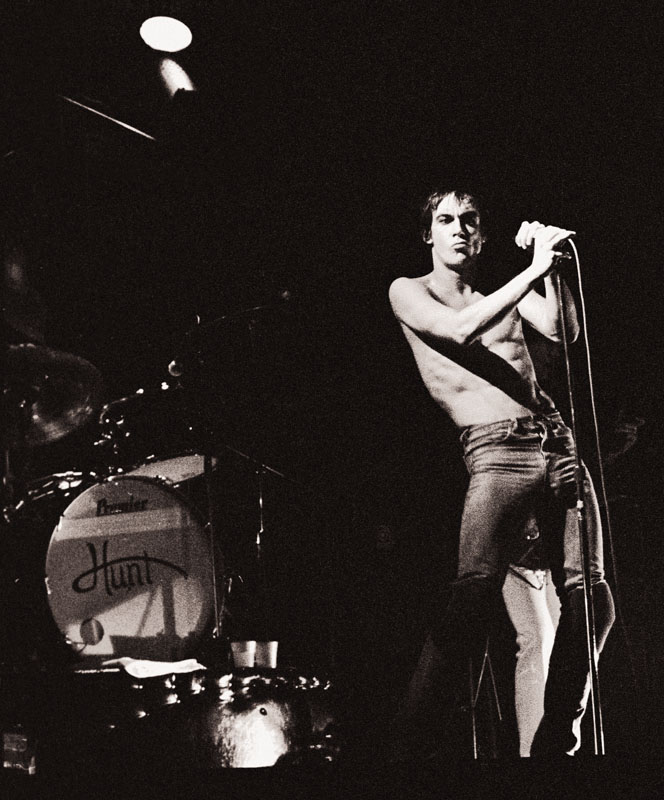
Iggy Pop was a member of the Stooges, who are considered one of the preeminent proto-punk acts.

In the late 1960s and early 1970s, several Michigan bands rooted in garage rock recorded works that became highly influential, particularly with the 1970s punk movement. In 1969, MC5 issued their live debut LP, Kick Out the Jams, which featured a set of highly energetic, politically charged songs. The Stooges, from Ann Arbor, were fronted by lead singer Iggy Pop, Describing their approach, Stephen Thomas Erlewine commented: "Taking their cue from the over-amplified pounding of British blues, the primal raunch of American garage rock, and the psychedelic rock (as well as the audience-baiting) of the Doors, the Stooges were raw, immediate, and vulgar." The group released three albums during this period, beginning with the self-titled The Stooges in 1969 and culminating with Raw Power (now billed as Iggy and the Stooges) in 1973, which featured the cathartic "Search and Destroy" as its opening track. The Alice Cooper band (previously the Spiders) relocated to Detroit, where they began to gain success with a new "shock rock" image, and recorded 1971's Love It to Death, which featured their breakout hit "I'm Eighteen".

Two bands that formed during the waning days of the Detroit scene in the early 1970s were the Punks and Death. The Punks had a sometimes thrashing sound that caught the attention of rock journalist Lester Bangs, and their song "My Time's Comin'" was retroactively featured in a 2016 episode of HBO's Vinyl. In 1974, Death, whose membership was made up of brothers David, Bobby, and Dannis Hackney, recorded tracks for an album that remained unreleased for over 30 years, ...For the Whole World to See, which, along with the release of their other previously unissued tracks, finally earned them a reputation as pioneers in punk rock. Death's music anticipated the arrival of later African American punk acts such as the Bad Brains.

In Boston, the Modern Lovers, led by Velvet Underground devotee Jonathan Richman, gained attention with their minimalistic style. In 1972, they recorded a set of demos that formed the basis of their belated Modern Lovers album in 1976. In 1974, an updated garage rock scene began to coalesce around the Rathskeller club in Kenmore Square. The Real Kids, a leading band in the scene, were founded by former Modern Lover John Felice. The Electric Eels, who formed in 1972, were a fixture in the underground rock scene in Cleveland, Ohio, which has sometimes been mentioned as a precursor to the punk scenes in New York and London. The Electric Eels were notorious for mayhem at their shows and had a markedly nihilistic approach suggestive of later acts and recorded a set of demos in 1975, from which the single "Agitated" b/w "Cyclotron" was eventually released in 1978, several years after the group's demise.

Between 1969 and 1975, other movements further removed from the American garage rock tradition emerged, that nonetheless displayed hallmarks of proto-punk, such as Glam and pub rock in Great Britain, as well as Krautrock in Germany. Conversely, glam rock had an influence on the sound of the New York Dolls from New York, exhibited on their 1973 self-titled debut album and its follow-up, Too Much Too Soon. The Dictators, fronted by Handsome Dick Manitoba, were another influential New York act of this period. The music from these disparate scenes helped set the stage for the punk rock phenomenon of the mid- to late- 1970s.

=== Mid-1970s: Emergence of the punk movement ===
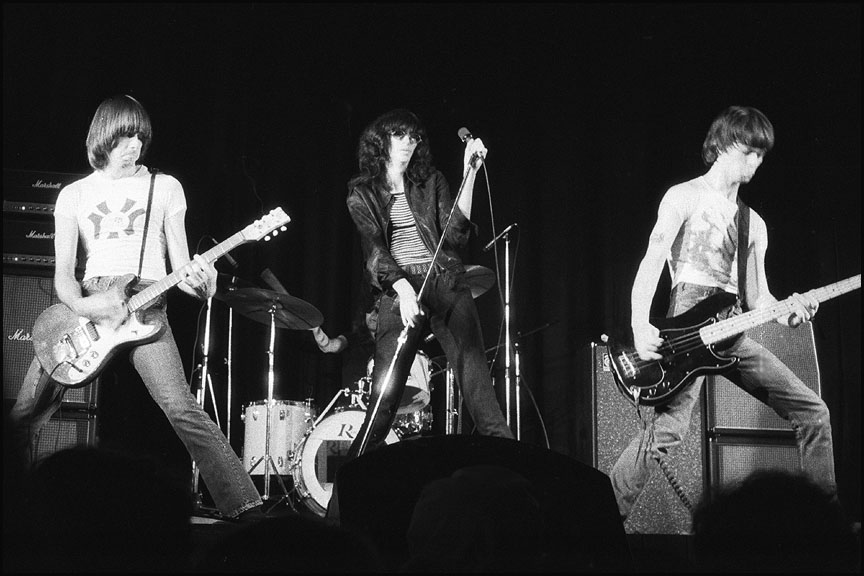
The Ramones (pictured in 1977), who were influenced by garage rock, spearheaded the punk movement in the 1970's.

Identification of garage rock by certain critics in the early 1970s (and their use of the term "punk rock" to describe it), as well as the 1972 Nuggets compilation exerted a marked degree of influence on the punk movement that emerged in the mid-to-late 1970s. As a result of the popularity of Nuggets and critical attention paid to primitive-sounding rock of the past and present, a self-conscious musical aesthetic began to emerge around the term "punk" that eventually manifested in the punk scenes of New York, London, and elsewhere between 1975 and 1977, and in the process transformed into a new musical and social movement having its own separate subculture, identity, and values.

The mid- to late-1970s saw the arrival of the acts now most commonly identified as punk rock. Frequently mentioned as the first of these were the Ramones from New York, some of whose members earlier played in 1960s garage bands. They were followed by the Sex Pistols in London, who struck a far more defiant pose and effectively heralded the arrival of punk as a cause célèbre in the larger public mind. Both bands spearheaded the popular punk movement from their respective locations. The Clash, known for their politically charged lyrics, were another important band to emerge from the London punk scene at this time. Their 1977 song "Garageland" with its line "We're a garage band/We come from garageland" specifically declared allegiance to the spirit of garage bands. Simultaneously, Australia developed its own punk scene, which derived some of its inspiration from the 1960s Australian garage/beat movement. One of its leading bands, the Saints, from Brisbane, included a rendition of the Missing Links' 1965 song "Wild About You" on their 1977 debut album.

Despite the influence of garage rock and proto-punk on the originating musicians of these scenes, in the later half of the 1970s punk rock emerged as a new phenomenon, distinct from its prior associations, and the garage band era of the 1960s came to be viewed as a distant forerunner.

== Revivalist and hybrid movements ==
Garage rock has experienced various revivals in the ensuing years and continues to influence numerous modern acts who prefer a "back to basics" and "do it yourself" musical approach.

=== 1970s–1980s: Retro revival acts ===
The earliest group to attempt to revive the sound of 1960s garage was the Droogs, from Los Angeles, who formed in 1972 and pre-dated many of the revival acts of the 1980s. In the early 1980s, revival scenes linked to the underground music movements of the period sprang up in Los Angeles, New York, Boston, and elsewhere, with acts such as the Chesterfield Kings, the Fuzztones, the Pandoras, and Lyres earnestly attempting to replicate the sound and look of the 1960s garage bands. This trend fed into the alternative rock movement and future grunge explosion, which embraced influences by 1960s garage bands such as the Sonics and the Wailers.

==== Garage punk ====
Out of the garage revival, a more aggressive form of garage rock known as garage punk emerged in the late 1980s. It differed from the "retro" revival in that its acts did not attempt to replicate the exact look and sound of 1960s groups, and their approach tended to be louder, often infusing garage rock with elements of Stooges-era proto-punk, 1970s punk rock, and other influences, creating a new hybrid. Several notable garage punk bands were the Gories, thee Mighty Caesars, the Mummies and thee Headcoats. Originally associated with the 1960s garage revival of the early 1980s, the Pandoras' sound became increasingly harder as decade progressed. Out of Japan came Guitar Wolf from Nagasaki and the 5.6.7.8's from Tokyo. Garage punk and revival acts persisted into the 1990s and the new millennium, with independent record labels releasing records by bands playing fast-paced, lo-fi music. Some of the more prolific independent labels include Estrus, Get Hip, Bomp!, and Sympathy for the Record Industry.

=== Garage rock revival ===
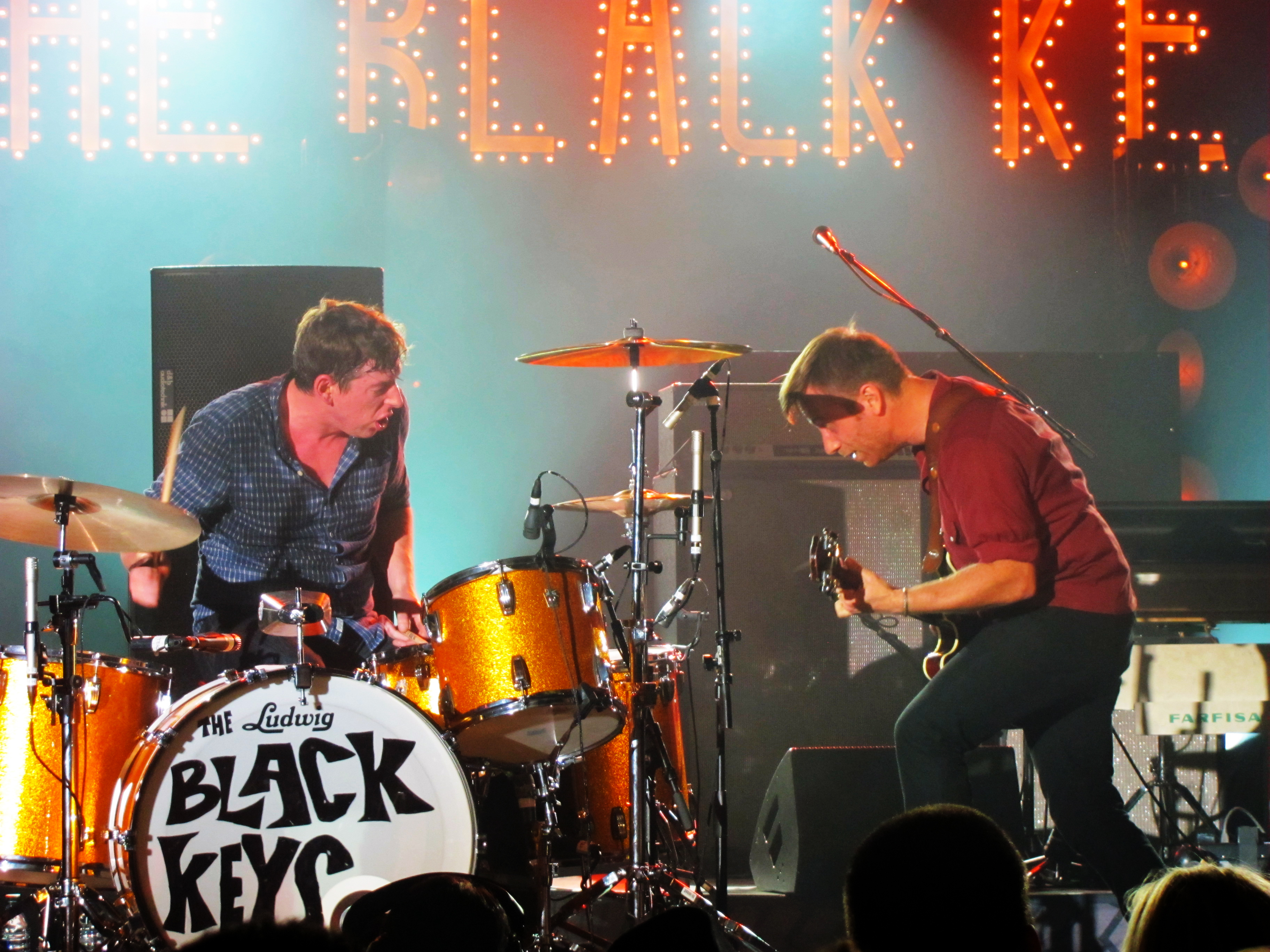
The Black Keys performing in 2011

The 2000s was identified as having another wave of garage rock revivalism, with NME in 2003 designating it a "new garage rock revolution", or simply a "new rock revolution". The mainstream attention to the revival began with the Strokes and their 2001 debut album Is This It. Playing a style indebted to '60s–'70s bands like the Velvet Underground and the Ramones, the band's intention musically was to sound like "a band from the past that took a time trip into the future to make their record." When the Strokes released their commercial debut, the public perception of "rock music" was based in post-grunge, nu metal and rap rock, putting their throwback style of garage rock as a stark contrast to the mainstream. The Strokes were accompanied in this commercial breakthrough by the White Stripes and the Hives, who according to music critic Jim DeRogatis, all had a sound "to some extent rooted in Nuggets-era garage rock".

Detroit's garage rock scene included the White Stripes, the Von Bondies, Electric Six, the Dirtbombs, the Detroit Cobras, and Rocket 455. Elsewhere, acts such as Billy Childish and the Buff Medways from Chatham, England, The Vines from Sydney, Australia, the (International) Noise Conspiracy from Umeå, Sweden, and Jay Reatard and the Oblivians from Memphis, enjoyed moderate underground success and appeal. A second wave of bands that gained international recognition as a result of the movement included the Black Keys, Black Rebel Motorcycle Club, Death from Above 1979, Yeah Yeah Yeahs, the Killers, Interpol, Cage the Elephant, and Kings of Leon from the US, the Libertines, Arctic Monkeys, Bloc Party, Editors, and Franz Ferdinand from the UK, Jet from Australia, and the Datsuns and the D4 from New Zealand.

The mid-2000s saw several underground bands achieve mainstream prominence. Acts such as Ty Segall, Thee Oh Sees, Black Lips, Jay Reatard, The King Khan & BBQ Show, and The Deadly Snakes that initially released records on smaller garage punk labels such as In the Red Records, began signing to larger, better-known independent labels. Several bands followed them in signing to larger labels such as Rough Trade and Drag City.

== Compilations ==
According to Peter Aaron, there are over a thousand garage rock compilations featuring work by various artists of the 1960s. The first major garage rock compilation, Nuggets: Original Artyfacts from the First Psychedelic Era, 1965–1968, was released by Elektra Records in 1972. Nuggets grew into a multi-volume series, when Rhino Records in the 1980s released fifteen installments that consisted of songs from the original album plus additional tracks. In 1998, Rhino released a four-CD box set version of Nuggets, containing the original album and three additional discs of material, that included extensive liner notes by some of garage rock's most influential writers.

The Pebbles series was begun by Greg Shaw and originally appeared on his Bomp label in 1978 and has been issued in successive installments on LP and CD. Back from the Grave is a series issued by Crypt Records that focuses on hard-driving and primitive examples of the genre. Big Beat Records' Uptight Tonight: The Ultimate 1960s Garage Punk Primer also features harder material. There are several notable anthologies devoted to female garage bands from the 1960s. Girls in the Garage was the first female garage rock series, and Ace Records' issued the more recent Girls with Guitars compilations.

There are numerous collections featuring garage/beat music from outside of North America. Rhino's Nuggets II: Original Artyfacts from the British Empire and Beyond, 1964–1969 4-CD box set includes music from the United Kingdom and other countries in the British commonwealth. It is of particular interest to fans of freakbeat. In 1984, when compiling reissues of obscure mid-1960s records for the Rubble series, English music journalist Phil Smee coined the term "freakbeat" to describe certain heavily distorted mod British music derived from beat that often used psychedelic studio experimentation.

The Trans World Punk Rave-Up series focuses on garage and Nederbeat music from Continental Europe from the 1960s. Ugly Things was the first compilation series to highlight 1960s Australian garage bands. Down Under Nuggets: Original Australian Artyfacts 1965–1967 is also devoted to Australian acts, while Do the Pop! The Australian Garage Rock Sound 1976-1987 covers more recent bands.

Los Nuggetz Volume Uno is devoted primarily to Latin American groups of the 1960s and is available in a single-CD edition, as well as an expanded 4-CD box set. GS I Love You: Japanese Garage Bands of the 1960s and its companion piece GS I Love You Too: Japanese Garage Bands of the 1960s Both sets feature GS acts from Japan. The Simla Beat 70/71 compilation consists of recordings by garage rock acts from India that competed in the 1970 and 1971 Simla Beat contests. Though its tracks were recorded at the turn of the 1970s, most of them bear a striking resemblance to music made in the West several years earlier.

== See also ==
- American rock
- List of 1960s one-hit wonders in the United States
- List of garage rock bands
- Nederpop

== Suggested reading ==
=== Books ===
- Aswell, Tom (2010). Louisiana Rocks!: The True Genesis of Rock and Roll (1st ed.). Gretna, Louisiana: Pelican Publishing Company. ISBN 978-1-58980-677-1.
- Bovey, Seth (2019). Five Years Ahead of My Time: Garage Rock from the 1950s to the Present. London: Reaktion Books. ISBN 9781789140651.
- Crowley, Kent (2011). Surf Beat: Rock 'n' Roll's Forgotten Revolution. New York: Backbeat Books. ISBN 9781617130076.
- Dalley, Robert J. (1996). Surfin' Guitars: Instrumental Surf Bands of the Sixties (2nd ed.). Ann Arbor, Michigan: Popular Culture, Ink. ISBN 1560750421.
- Davidson, Eric (2010). We Never Learn: The Gunk Punk Undergut, 1988–2001. Backbeat Books (Hal Leonard Performing Arts Publishing). ISBN 978-0-87930-972-5.
- Edmondson, Jacqueline (April 2009). Jerry Garcia: A Biography. Santa Barbara, California: Greenwood Biographies. ISBN 978-0-313-35121-1.
- Gendron, Bernard (2002). Between Montmartre and the Mudd Club: Popular Music and the Avant-Garde (1st ed.). University of Chicago Press. ISBN 978-0-226-28735-5.
- Grubbs, David (2014). Records Ruin the Landscape: John Cage, the Sixties, and Sound Recording (1st ed.). Duke University Press. ISBN 978-0-8223-5576-2.
- Hall, Ron (2001). Playing for a Piece of the Door: A History of Garage & Frat Bands in Memphis 1960–1975 (1st ed.). Memphis: Sharngri-La Projects. ISBN 978-0-9668575-1-1.
- Joynson, Vernon (2004) Fuzz, Acid and Flowers Revisited: A Comprehensive Guide to American Garage, Psychedelic and Hippie Rock (1964-1975). Borderline ISBN 978-1-899855-14-8.
- Kristiansen, Lars J. (2010). Screaming for Change: Articulating a Unifying Philosophy of Punk Rock. Rowman & Littlefield Publishers Inc. ISBN 978-0-7391-4274-5.
- Medina, Cuahtémoc (Autumn 2005). Pellizzi, Francesco (ed.). Res: Anthropology and Aesthetics, 48: Autumn 2005: Permanent/Impermanent - Henry Flynt. Harvard University Press. p. 187. ISBN 978-0-87365-766-2.
- Murrells, Joseph (1978). The Book of Golden Discs (2nd ed.). London: Barrie and Jenkins Ltd. ISBN 978-0-214-20512-5.
- Rogan, Johnny (1998). The Byrds: Timeless Flight Revisited (2nd ed.). Rogan House. ISBN 978-0-9529540-1-9.
- Rosenberg, Stuart (2008). Rock and Roll and the American Landscape: The Birth of an Industry and the Expansion of the Popular Culture, 1955–1969. iUniverse. ISBN 978-1-4401-6458-3.
- Swenson, John (2012). New Atlantis: Musicians Battle for the Survival of New Orleans. Oxford, UK: Oxford University Press. ISBN 978-0-19-993171-2.
- Thompson, Dave (September 1, 2002). The Music Lover's Guide to Record Collecting. San Francisco: Backbeat Books. ISBN 978-0-87930-713-4.
- Unterberger, Richie (2000). Urban Spacemen and Wayfaring Strangers: Overlooked Innovators and Eccentric Visionaries of '60s Rock. Hal Leonard Corporation. ISBN 978-0-87930-616-8.
- Whitburn, Joel (2004). The Billboard Book of Top 40 Hits: Eighth Edition. Record Research. p. 499. ISBN 978-0-8230-8554-5.
- Wickham, Barry G.; Richman, Geoffrey M. (2008). Price and Reference Guide for 1960s Garage, Psychedelic and Uncharted Rock 45s. Petaluma, California: Richman and Wickham. ISBN 9780615260211.
- Reverendo Lys (2019). Born Losers - Pepite e lastre di selce. Italia. Arcana editore, ISBN 9788862316637

=== News ===
- Christgau, Robert (October 14, 1971). "Consumer Guide (20)". The Village Voice – via www.robertchristgau.com.
- Gordon, Robert (August 16, 2013). "Memphis: Where to Find the Blues". The Guardian. Archived from the original on August 17, 2013.
- Wilonsky, Robert (June 3, 2011). "Journey Through Tyme, or: Finally a History of Dallas' Great Garage Rock Scene of the 1960s". Dallas Observer. Archived from the original on July 15, 2015.

=== Websites ===
- Eder, Bruce. "The Music Machine". AllMusic.
- Skelly, Richard. "The Syndicate of Sound". AllMusic.
- Unterberger, Richie. "Kenny & the Kasuals". AllMusic.
- Unterberger, Richie. "The Wheels". AllMusic.
