= The Barbarians (band) =

American garage rock band

- Origin: Cape Cod, Massachusetts, United States
- Genres: Garage rock
- Years active: 1964-1967
- Labels: Joy; Laurie
- Past members: Victor Moulton; Bruce Benson; Ronnie Enos; Geoffrey Morris; Jerry Causi

The Barbarians was an American garage rock band formed in Cape Cod, Massachusetts, that was active from 1964 to 1967. They are known for their 1965 hit song "Are You a Boy or Are You a Girl", and their album of the same name.

== History ==
The Barbarians were formed in the summer of 1964 in Provincetown, Massachusetts, by original members Victor "Moulty" Moulton, Bruce Benson, Ronnie Enos, and Jerry Causi. Victor Moulton was born on February 24, 1945, in Provincetown, Massachusetts. The band was quickly assembled by Moulton, who had agreed to do a gig at The Rumpus Room, an ex-jazz club where his cousin worked. After packing the house for their opening performance, they were asked to come back numerous times throughout the season. By the end of the summer, record companies had heard about them and they were taken to New York to start their careers. While their first single, "Hey Little Bird" produced by Al Ham (on Joy Records (New York)) was unsuccessful, two of their next three singles (on Laurie) charted on Billboard, (with "Are You a Boy or Are You a Girl?," peaking at No. 55) and also made the Cash Box charts. "Are You a Boy" was produced by Doug Morris, who went on to head Universal Music Group.

They received their biggest break when featured on The T.A.M.I. Show (performing "Hey Little Bird") alongside other artists such as The Rolling Stones, The Supremes, Lesley Gore, Chuck Berry, James Brown & The Famous Flames, The Miracles, and Marvin Gaye. Their "pirates on the beach" look—leather sandals, open necked/bloused sleeved shirts (sometimes a vest as well), black jeans, longer-than-usual hair—was distinctive, topped by the sight of drummer Moulton's hook-shaped prosthetic left hand, which he would use to hold his left drumstick during performances. Having lost the hand in an explosion when he was fourteen, Moulton had enabled his drumming by modifying the prosthesis to hold a drumstick. At the height of their popularity, the band was touted as an American counterpart of The Rolling Stones.

During their tenure, the Barbarians produced two nationally charting hits, including the novelty single, "Are You a Boy or Are You a Girl?". A later, minor hit, entitled "Moulty", was a humorous and melodramatic autobiographical song chronicling the drummer's life and the loss of his hand. Moulton sang lead on the track, but instead of the original members, he was backed by New York session musicians including members of Levon & the Hawks, later to be known as The Band. Although it barely scraped the Billboard charts, the song would gain a cult following when it was included on Lenny Kaye's Nuggets compilation in 1972.

In 1965, Boston guitarist Geoffrey Morris replaced Ronnie Enos on lead guitar, providing the arrangement of "Are You a Boy or Are You a Girl?," a song parodying the trend towards long hair popularized by British Invasion rock acts, such as the Beatles and the Rolling Stones, which was regarded at the time by parents as a bad influence on young males. The song would be released as a single in 1966. In 1967, Benson, Morris, and Causi left The Barbarians to form Black Pearl. One year later, having become a version of the group incorporating Denny Romans a.k.a. Demian Bell (from Maypole) as the lead guitarist and lead singer, and Walter Parks as Bass player, the Barbarians disbanded. They had evolved to combine martial arts and music by rigorously rehearsing nearly every day at a Karate dojo owned by Moulton's brother-in-law. They briefly re-formed in 1973 to cut an album under a different lineup.

The Ramones' song, "Do You Remember Rock 'n' Roll Radio?," the opening song on their 1980 album End of the Century, includes "Moulty" in the litany of rock and roll figures and institutions name-dropped in its lyrics.

== Members ==
- Ronnie Enos - guitar (1964-1965)
- Bruce Benson - guitar (1964-1967)
- Geoffrey Morris - guitar (1965-1967)
- Jerry Causi - vocals, bass guitar (1964-1967)
- Victor "Moulty" Moulton - drums (1964-1967)

== Discography ==
- "Hey Little Bird" b/w "You've Got to Understand": Joy J-290 (1964)
- "Are You a Boy or Are You a Girl": Laurie L-3308 (1965)
- "What the New Breed Say" b/w "Susie-Q": Laurie LR 3321 (1965)
- "Moulty" b/w "I'll Keep on Seeing You": Laurie 3326 (1966)

== Filmography ==
Year	Title	Role
1964	T.A.M.I Show	Themselves

== National chart appearances ==
=== Billboard ===
- "Are You a Boy or Are You a Girl." Debuted on September 25, 1965, peaked at No. 55, stayed on charts 6 weeks
- "What the New Breed Say." Debuted on Bubbling Under charts on November 20, 1965, peaked at No. 102, stayed on Bubbling under charts 6 weeks. Did not proceed to Hot 100 Chart.
- "Moulty." Debuted on February 26, 1966, peaked at No. 90, stayed on charts 4 weeks.

=== Cash Box ===
- "Are You a Boy Or Are You a Girl." Debuted on September 18, 1965, peaked at No. 62, and stayed on the charts for 7 weeks.
- "Moulty." Debuted on March 5, 1966, peaked at No. 97, stayed on charts 1 week.
