= Moulty (song) =

Single by The Barbarians
- B-side: "I'll Keep on Seeing You"
- Released: February 1966
- Recorded: 1966
- Length: 2:37
- Label: Laurie
- Songwriters: Doug Morris, Barbara Baer, Eliot Greenberg, Robert Schwartz
- Producer: Doug Morris

The Barbarians singles chronology
"What the New Breed Say" (1965)	"Moulty" (1966)

"Moulty" is a song by the American band The Barbarians, and was released in 1966 on Laurie Records. It was written by Doug Morris, Barbara Baer, Eliot Greenberg, and Robert Schwartz, and was also produced by Morris. The song was backed by the Hawks, later known as the Band. The lyrics refer to drummer Victor "Moulty" Moulton's loss of his left hand, and the feelings of estrangement that followed.

The song would be released as a single by the label without the consent of Moulton, which led to the Barbarians ceasing relations with the company. "Moulty" would peak at number 90 on the Billboard Hot 100 and be the band's second and final hit after their single "Are You a Boy or Are You a Girl".

== History ==
Victor "Moulty" Moulton, the subject of the song, was drummer of The Barbarians, despite the impairment of his left hand. Moulton critically damaged the hand when, at the age of 14, a homemade pipe bomb prematurely detonated while it was in Moulton's grip. The hand was amputated, and subsequently replaced with a metallic prosthetic device that Moulton could attach a drum stick to. When Moulton formed the group in 1964, his disability added an unusual allure to the band's rebellious image that was, in part, responsible for their popularity after their appearance on The T.A.M.I. Show alongside The Rolling Stones, Lesley Gore, and The Supremes.

Moulton commenced recording of the song in early 1966 in New York City while the rest of the band was in Boston. For the recording session, Moulton was backed by the Hawks, later known as the Band, who were currently working as Bob Dylan's support group. The lyrics were rearranged by Moulton to include the spoken intro section of the song. The composition opens with Moulton melodramatically reflecting on the struggle of losing his left hand, while the backing vocalists encouraged "Moulty" to "Don't turn away". It continues with "Moulty" achieving his dream, and the song shifts into a ballad-esque structure in the third verse when "Moulty" realizes he is still lacking love. A chorus ensues and fades out, leaving the question of whether or not "Moulty" managed to find his love. With the uncertain conclusion, a mystique remained around Moulton, which played a role in his enigmatic persona.

Originally, the song was only intended to be released under the consent of Moulton, who was opposed to its distribution. However, Laurie Records released "Moulty" along with "I'll Keep On Seeing You" in February 1966 as a single. Upon discovering the distribution of the song, Moulton was infuriated with president of Laurie Records, Robert Schwartz, reportedly quarreling with him, and destroying some copies of the single. Regardless, "Moulty" managed to peak at number 90 on the Billboard Hot 100, remaining on the charts for four weeks. The song became somewhat of an inspiration to the band's younger followers, insisting them to "never give up no matter what the odds". However, The Barbarians were so disgruntled with management for releasing the song over Moulton's objection that the band soon ceased relations with the company. "Moulty" was later immortalized in the compilation album, Nuggets: Original Artyfacts from the First Psychedelic Era, 1965-1968, and included as a bonus track in the 2000 Sundazed Music reissue of the group's debut album.
