= Live 'n Wild =

Live 'n wild

Live album by The Savages
- Released: 1966
- Recorded: February 6, 1966
- Genre: Garage rock; rock & roll; protopunk
- Label: Duane
- Producer: Eddie DeMello

Live 'N Wild is a live album released in 1966 by The Savages, a garage rock band from Bermuda, which was recorded live at the Hub, a nightclub at the Princess Hotel in their native country. Consisting of mostly self-composed songs, the album is considered a seminal work in the garage rock genre, and features the song, "The World Ain't Round It's Square," which has come to be regarded as a classic '60s anthem of youthful defiance.

== History ==
=== Background ===
The Savages were formed in 1965 by Paul Muggleton and Jimmy O'Connor, both guitarists. They would often watch fellow Bermudan band, the Gents, play at nightclubs and decided to form a band of their own. They recruited Bobby Zuill, on bass, and Howie Rego, on drums. Muggleton usually sang lead vocals, but Zuill handled vocals on certain numbers. The band played teen functions and eventually were able to gain a residence at the Hub, a nightclub at the Princess Hotel, sometimes doing as many a three gigs a day, often for American college students on vacation.

They signed a recording contract with the Duane label, which also housed the Gents, run by Eddie DeMello, who would also manage the band and produce their material. The group had previously done mostly covers of other artists' songs, until they were asked by the label to cut a full album of material, which necessitated the urge to come up with a batch of original songs.

=== Recording and release ===
On February 6, 1966, the band were recorded during a live performance in front of about 150 patrons at the Hub, a nightclub at the Princess Hotel, which featured the band doing self-composed songs such as "Poor Man's Son," Man on the Moon," "Quiet Town," and the ventful "The World Ain't Round It's Square," sung in a scowling voice by Bobby Zuill. According to Rob Zuill, "...we were so scared that we played everything too fast…" The album also would contain three cover songs from the performance, which would include a version of the Icelandic song, "Ertu Med" which would also be recorded in a very different manner by Thor's Hammer later in 1966. One of Savages' original songs recorded this night, "No No No," would be covered by Connecticut band The Instincts. The resulting album taken from the show, Live 'n Wild, was a surprisingly diverse collection, containing a balance of rock & roll songs and ballads. Four songs would appear as A and B sides on singles, including "The World Ain't Round It's Square."

The album was released in 1966. The band's manager set up a tour of the West Indies for the band and arranged for them to go to New York to play and record. While in New York, they recorded a single, featuring "Roses are Red," which would be released on the Duane label, later in 1966. However, just as they were beginning to establish themselves in New York, the members got involved in a life-threatening incident, provoked by two members of the band. As a result of hard feelings created by the incident, the band broke up before the end of the year.

=== Critical reception ===
The album is considered to be a seminal work by garage rock enthusiasts and collectors and is sometimes cited as one of the finest live albums in the genre. According to Allmusic, the album " stands as one of the best '60s full-length garage platters." The song, "The World Ain't Round It's Square," included on the album, has been mentioned as a classic anthem of anger and defiance. (Note: In Mike Markesich's Teenbeat Mayhem, according to the polling of a handful of preeminent garage rock writers, collectors, and experts, the song is rated as a ten out of ten, and ranked at number 4 in the list of the 1000 greatest garage rock records, placing it in the top five of all time, according to that poll.) Yet, the album shows the band to be versatile and adept at writing ballads as well as rocking songs.

== Discography and track information ==
=== The album ===
- Live 'n Wild (Duane ELP 1047, rel. 1966)

==== Side 1 ====
- "Intro"
- "Poor Man's Son"
- "She's Gone"
- "Gone to the Moon"
- "Quiet Town"
- "Oh My Soul"
- "Broadway"

==== Side 2 ====
- "Nobody But You"
- "Ertu Med" ("He's a Man")
- "I Believe"
- "The World Ain't Round It's Square"
- "We've Got to Get Out of This Place"
- "No No No"
- "Theme"

=== Singles ===
- No No No / She's Gone (Duane 1043, rel. 1966)
- Roses Are Red My Love / Quiet Town (Duane 1049, rel. 1966)
- The World Ain't Round It's Square / You're on My Mind (Duane 1054, rel. 1966)
