= Are You a Boy or Are You a Girl =

Single by The Barbarians

from the album Are You a Boy or Are You a Girl
- B-side: "Take It or Leave It"
- Released: September 1965
- Recorded: 1965
- Length: 2:17
- Label: Laurie
- Songwriters: Doug & Ron Morris
- Producer: Doug Morris

The Barbarians singles chronology
"Hey Little Bird" (1965)	"Are You a Boy or Are You a Girl" (1965)	"What the New Breed Say" (1965)

"Are You a Boy or Are You a Girl" is a song written by Doug & Ron Morris for the American band The Barbarians. It was released as the group's second single, and was the first and most successful tune for the Barbarians to chart on the Billboard Hot 100 and Cashbox.

Following the group's unsuccessful debut, "Hey Little Bird", The Barbarians had their breakthrough with an appearance, alongside other musical artists such as The Rolling Stones and The Supremes, on The T.A.M.I. Show. In order to take advantage of their exposure, the band recorded "Are You a Boy or Are You a Girl" with the B-side, "Take It or Leave It". Guitarist Geoff Morris, who had recently joined the band, was responsible for the arrangements. The song reflected the social commentary of the period, specifically around what distinguishes a male from a female. The lyrics express both sides' opposing views on issues like hair length or how a person dresses. The band members themselves grew their hair long and wore unusual clothing. Jerry Causi, as lead vocalist, initiates call and response with Bruce Benson and Geoff Morris on backing vocals. There is also mockery toward bands from England with lyrics like "You're either a girl, or you come from Liverpool", and more specifically "You can dance like a female monkey, but sink like a stone...yeah a rolling stone", a direct reference to The Rolling Stones. The song ends with a brief R&B-influenced guitar solo before fading out.

"Are You a Boy or Are You a Girl", with its B-side "Take It or Leave It", was released in September 1965 on the Laurie label. It peaked at number 55 nationally, and stayed on the charts for six weeks. The song was also featured on the group's debut album of the same name, as the opening track. Despite the publicity following their modest hit, the album failed to chart. The song has been included on several compilations thereafter, most prominently the 1998 reissue of Nuggets: Original Artyfacts from the First Psychedelic Era, 1965-1968.

== Releases ==
=== Singles/EPs ===
- "Are You a Boy or Are You a Girl" b/w "Take It or Leave It" – Laurie Records, #LR 3308, 1965
- Are You a Boy or Are You a Girl EP – Disques Vouge, #INT 18027, 1965
- "Little Bit O' Soul" b/w "Are You a Boy or Are You a Girl" – Laurie Records, #LDG 113, 1978 (A-side features The Music Explosion)

=== Albums/Compilations ===
- Are You a Boy or Are You a Girl – 1965
- Nuggets, Vol. 1: The Hits – 1986
- Classic Old and Gold – 1987
- Nuggets: Even More Nuggets – 1989
- Classic Rock: Rock Renaissance, Vol. 3 – 1990
- Nuggets: Original Artyfacts from the First Psychedelic Era, 1965-1968 – 1998 (reissue)
- The Laurie Records Story, Vol. 1 – 2003
- Absolutely the Best of the Sixties, Vol. 2 – 2004
