= Nuggets (series) =

Compilation album series by Rhino Records

Nuggets is a series of compilation albums, started by Elektra Records in 1972 and continued by Rhino Records thereafter. The series focuses primarily on relatively obscure garage and psychedelic rock songs from the 1960s, but with some hits and pop-oriented songs also included.

In 1972, Elektra released Nuggets: Original Artyfacts from the First Psychedelic Era, 1965–1968, compiled by Lenny Kaye. The later series by Rhino consists of 12 vinyl-only and three single-CD albums, all released during the 1980s. In 1998, Rhino issued a 4-CD Nuggets box set, which was essentially the original 1972 LP with 91 bonus tracks. Four more box sets and four single-CDs releases followed.

The music on Rhino's 1984–1989 Nuggets series is similar to that on Kaye's original compilation. While many of the songs on the 1980s series' 15 albums appeared on the original Nuggets double LP, others were new to the series and some eventually wound up on Rhino's 1998 box set. Although most of the music was recorded by US groups, there are some exceptions, such as the Troggs (English) and the Easybeats (Australian).

In 2012, Australian label Festival Records issued their own CD compilation titled Down Under Nuggets: Original Australian Artyfacts, 1965–1967, followed by a vinyl release the following year.

== Discography ==
=== Original compilation: 1972 ===
The original 1972 Nuggets compilation was a 2-LP set of 27 American psychedelic and garage rock singles that were originally released during the mid-to-late 1960s. It was created by Lenny Kaye, and was reissued with a new cover design by Sire Records in 1976. For more information:

- Nuggets: Original Artyfacts from the First Psychedelic Era, 1965–1968 (1972)

=== Nuggets, volumes 1 through 12: 1984–1985 ===
Rhino issued a 12-volume series of Nuggets LPs in 1984–1985; there are 168 tracks across the 12 volumes. All tracks are by American performers, and the LPs feature a mix of garage rock, folk rock, pop and other related genres.

The 12-volume Nuggets series had a broader scope than the original LPs, and only 16 of the 27 tracks on the original Nuggets 2-LP set were included in the 12 volume series.

Many tracks from the 12-volume series were later included in the 1998 Nuggets 4-CD box set. Of the 116 tracks in the CD box set, 72 are found in the 12-volume LP series.

- Tracks included on the original 1972 compilation are noted in the columns labelled Nuggets 2LP.
- Tracks included on the later 1998 4-CD box set are noted in the columns labelled Nuggets Box.
- Tracks included in specialized Nuggets compilations are noted in the Other column.
  - Tracks marked H appear on Hallucinations: Psychedelic Pop Nuggets from the WEA Vaults
  - Tracks marked LA appear on Where the Action Is! Los Angeles Nuggets 1965–1968.
  - tracks marked SF appear on Love Is the Song We Sing: San Francisco Nuggets 1965-1970

==== Nuggets, Volume 1: The Hits (1984) ====
Artist	Title	Nuggets 2LP	Nuggets Box	Other	Notes
The Leaves	Hey Joe	Yes	Yes		US #31
The Electric Prunes	I Had Too Much to Dream (Last Night)	Yes	Yes		US #11
The Five Americans	I See the Light		Yes		US #26
The Standells	Dirty Water	Yes	Yes		US #11
The Human Beinz	Nobody But Me		Yes		US #8
Blues Magoos	(We Ain't Got) Nothin' Yet		Yes		US #5
The Barbarians	Are You a Boy or Are You a Girl		Yes		US #55
The Seeds	Pushin' Too Hard	Yes	Yes		US #36
The Music Machine	Talk Talk		Yes		US #15
Count Five	Psychotic Reaction	Yes	Yes	SF	US #5
The Balloon Farm	A Question of Temperature		Yes		US #37
Nazz	Open My Eyes	Yes	Yes		US #112
The Amboy Dukes	Journey to the Center of the Mind		Yes		US #16
Blue Cheer	Summertime Blues			SF	US #3

==== Nuggets, Volume 2: Punk (1984) ====
Artist	Title	Nuggets 2LP	Nuggets Box	Other	Notes
Love	My Little Red Book				US #52
The Shadows of Knight	Gloria				US #10
The Seeds	"Can't Seem to Make You Mine"		Yes		US #41
The Music Machine	Double Yellow Line		Yes		US #111
The Chocolate Watchband	Are You Gonna Be There (At The Love-In)?		Yes		
The Del-Vetts	Last Time Around		Yes		
The Vagrants	Respect	Yes	Yes		
The Standells	Try It				
The Shadows of Knight	I'm Gonna Make You Mine		Yes		US #90
The Music Machine	The Eagle Never Hunts The Fly				
The Leaves	Too Many People		Yes		
The Sonics	Strychnine		Yes		
The Elastik Band	Spazz		Yes		
The Standells	Sometimes Good Guys Don't Wear White		Yes		US #43

==== Nuggets, Volume 3: Pop (1984) ====
Artist	Title	Nuggets 2LP	Nuggets Box	Other	Notes
The Knickerbockers	Lies	Yes	Yes		US #20
The Cryan' Shames	Sugar And Spice	Yes	Yes		US #49
The Lewis & Clarke Expedition	I Feel Good (I Feel Bad)				US #64
The Parade	Sunshine Girl				US #20
Boyce & Hart	I Wonder What She's Doing Tonight				US #8
The Cyrkle	Turn Down Day				US #16
The Merry-Go-Round	You're A Very Lovely Woman				US #94
The Bobby Fuller Four	Let Her Dance				US #133
The Turtles	Can I Get To Know You Better				US #89
The Cyrkle	Red Rubber Ball				US #2
Spiral Starecase	Baby What I Mean				US #111
The Outsiders	Time Won't Let Me		Yes		US #5
People!	I Love You			SF	US #14
October Country	October Country				

==== Nuggets, Volume 4: Pop, Part Two (1984) ====
Artist	Title	Nuggets 2LP	Nuggets Box	Other	Notes
The Merry-Go-Round	Live		Yes		US #63
The Outsiders	Lost In My World				
The Royal Guardsmen	Baby Let's Wait				US #35
Teddy & The Pandas	We Can't Go On This Way				US #103
The Parade	She Sleeps Alone				
The E-Types	Put The Clock Back On The Wall		Yes		
The Palace Guard	Falling Sugar		Yes		
The Knickerbockers	One Track Mind		Yes		US #46
The Chartbusters	She's The One				US #33
The Palace Guard	All Night Long			LA	
lyme & cybelle	Follow Me		Yes		US #65
The Long Island Sound	1, 2, 3 And I Fell				
The Rumors	Without Her				
The Yellow Balloon	Yellow Balloon			LA	US #25

==== Nuggets, Volume 5: Pop, Part Three (1985) ====
Artist	Title	Nuggets 2LP	Nuggets Box	Other	Notes
The Knickerbockers	High On Love			LA	US #94
The Vacels	You're My Baby (And Don't You Forget It)				US #63
The Vogues	You're The One				US #4
Hackamore Brick	Got A Gal Named Wilma				
The Lovin' Spoonful	She Is Still A Mystery				US #27
The Association	Pandora's Golden Heebie Jeebies			H	US #35
The Mojo Men	Sit Down I Think I Love You	Yes	Yes		US #36
The American Breed	Bend Me, Shape Me				US #5
Cherokee	Girl, I've Got News For You				US #116
The Grass Roots	Where Were You When I Needed You				US #28
The Electric Prunes	Everybody Knows You're Not In Love				
The Trade Winds	Mind Excursion				
Strawberry Alarm Clock	Tomorrow				US #23
Primrose Circus	P. S. Call Me Lulu				

==== Nuggets, Volume 6: Punk, Part Two (1985) ====
Artist	Title	Nuggets 2LP	Nuggets Box	Other	Notes
Mouse	A Public Execution	Yes	Yes		US #121
Captain Beefheart & His Magic Band	Diddy Wah Diddy		Yes		
The Nightcrawlers	The Little Black Egg		Yes		US #85
The Brogues	I Ain't No Miracle Worker		Yes		
The Unrelated Segments	Where You Gonna Go				
Black Pearl	Forget It				
We The People	Mirror Of Your Mind		Yes		
The Shadows of Knight	Oh Yeah	Yes	Yes		US #39
Steppenwolf	Sookie, Sookie				
The Chocolate Watchband	Sweet Young Thing		Yes		
The Grass Roots	Mr. Jones (Ballad Of A Thin Man)			SF	US #121
The Seeds	Try To Understand				
The Underdogs	Love's Gone Bad		Yes		US #122
The Electric Prunes	Get Me To The World On Time		Yes		

==== Nuggets, Volume 7: Early San Francisco (1985) ====
Artist	Title	Nuggets 2LP	Nuggets Box	Other	Notes
The Beau Brummels	Laugh, Laugh		Yes		US #15
The Beau Brummels	Just a Little				US #8
The Mojo Men	Dance with Me				US #61
The Mojo Men	She's My Baby		Yes	SF	
The Vejtables	I Still Love You				
The Vejtables	The Last Thing on My Mind				
Jan Ashton	Cold Dreary Morning				
We Five	You Were on My Mind			SF	US #3
We Five	You Let a Love Burn Out				
The Charlatans	Codine		Yes		
The Great Society	Somebody to Love			SF	
The Great Society	Free Advice			SF	
Country Joe and the Fish	Bass Strings				
The Tikis	I Must Be Dreaming				

==== Nuggets, Volume 8: The Northwest (1985) ====
Artist	Title	Nuggets 2LP	Nuggets Box	Other	Notes
The Kingsmen	Louie, Louie		Yes		US #2
The Sonics	Boss Hoss				
Paul Revere & The Raiders	Over You				US #133
The Wailers	Hang Up				
The Initial Shock	Mind Disaster				
The Daily Flash	Jack Of Diamonds		Yes		
The Weeds	It's Your Time				
Paul Revere & The Raiders	Just Like Me		Yes		US #11
The Wailers	You Weren't Using Your Head				
The Surprise Package	Out Of My Mind				
The Sonics	He's Waitin'				
The Daily Flash	Violets Of Dawn				
The Kingsmen	I Guess I Was Dreaming				
Floating Bridge	Don't Mean A Thing				

==== Nuggets, Volume 9: Acid Rock (1985) ====
Artist	Title	Nuggets 2LP	Nuggets Box	Other	Notes
Love	7 and 7 Is		Yes		US #33
The Byrds	Eight Miles High				US #14
The Grass Roots	Feelings				
The First Edition	Just Dropped In (To See What Condition My Condition Was In)				US #5
Steppenwolf	Magic Carpet Ride				US #3
The Young Rascals	It's Wonderful				US #20
The Monkees	Porpoise Song			H	US #62
The Turtles	She's My Girl				US #14
Strawberry Alarm Clock	Incense and Peppermints		Yes		US #1
The Seeds	The Wind Blows Your Hair				
Vanilla Fudge	You Keep Me Hangin' On				US #6
Iron Butterfly	In-A-Gadda-Da-Vida (single edit)				US #30
The Chambers Brothers	Time Has Come Today				US #11
The West Coast Pop Art Experimental Band	I Won't Hurt You				

==== Nuggets, Volume 10: Folk Rock (1985) ====
Artist	Title	Nuggets 2LP	Nuggets Box	Other	Notes
The Byrds	Mr. Tambourine Man				US #1
The Turtles	It Ain't Me Babe				US #8
The Grass Roots	Only When You're Lonely				US #96
The Deep Six	Rising Sun				
Jake Holmes	Dazed And Confused				
The Sunshine Company	Back On The Street Again				US #36
Scott McKenzie	San Francisco (Be Sure To Wear Flowers In Your Hair)				US #4
Barry McGuire	Eve Of Destruction				US #1
The Nitty Gritty Dirt Band	Buy For Me The Rain				US #45
M.F.Q.	Nighttime Girl			LA	
The Peanut Butter Conspiracy	It's A Happening Thing				US #93
The Love Exchange	Swallow The Sun				
P.F. Sloan	The Sins Of A Family				US #87
Hearts & Flowers	Rock 'N' Roll Gypsies				

==== Nuggets, Volume 11: Pop, Part Four (1985) ====
Artist	Title	Nuggets 2LP	Nuggets Box	Other	Notes
The Grass Roots	Let's Live For Today				US #8
The Left Banke	Pretty Ballerina				US #15
Montage	I Shall Call Her Mary				
Gene Clark	Echoes				
The Sunshine Company	Happy				US #50
The Magicians	An Invitation To Cry	Yes	Yes		
Fever Tree	San Francisco Girls (Return of the Native)				US #91
Lee Michaels	Hello				
The Third Rail	Run, Run, Run	Yes	Yes		US #53
The Critters	Mr. Dieingly Sad				US #17
Blues Magoos	I Can Hear The Grass Grow				
The Blues Project	No Time Like The Right Time	Yes	Yes		US #96
The American Breed	Step Out Of Your Mind				US #24
Keith	Ain't Gonna Lie				US #39

==== Nuggets, Volume 12: Punk, Part Three (1985) ====
Artist	Title	Nuggets 2LP	Nuggets Box	Other	Notes
Syndicate of Sound	Little Girl		Yes		US #8
Paul Revere & The Raiders	Steppin' Out		Yes		US #46
Kenny And The Kasuals	Journey To Tyme		Yes		
The Other Half	Mr. Pharmacist		Yes		
The Spats	She Done Moved			LA	
The Remains	Don't Look Back	Yes	Yes		
Max Frost and the Troopers	Shape of Things to Come		Yes		US #22
The Hombres	Let It Out (Let It All Hang Out)		Yes		US #12
The Woolies	Who Do You Love?		Yes		US #95
Mouse and the Traps	Maid Of Sugar, Maid Of Spice		Yes		
Harbinger Complex	I Think I'm Down		Yes		
The Lollipop Shoppe	You Must Be A Witch		Yes		
The Uniques	You Ain't Tuff		Yes		
The Unrelated Segments	The Story Of My Life		Yes		

=== Nuggets, Psychedelic Sixties: 1986–1989 ===
Beginning in 1986, Rhino curated another configuration of Nuggets volumes, this time on CD. These volumes drew from the original Nuggets 2-LP set, and the later 12-volume LP series, but also included tracks completely new to the Nuggets series. As well, a handful of tracks were from non-American acts, specifically tracks by the Troggs (England) and the Easybeats (Australia).

The 3CD collection consists of 54 tracks. This iteration of Nuggets has an extremely different track listing when compared to the original LPs:

- Only 11 of the 27 tracks on the original Nuggets 2LP set are featured across these three CDs.
- Only 37 of the 168 tracks from the 12-LP series are featured across these 3 CDs.

As well, numerous tracks from these three CDs were later incorporated into the later Nuggets 4CD box set -- although many, many tracks were not ported over into the CD box set. Of the 116 tracks on the 1998 4CD box set, 32 are featured in this 3CD series.

- Tracks included on the original 1972 compilation are noted in the columns labelled Nuggets 2LP.
- Tracks included on the later 1998 4-CD box set are noted in the columns labelled Nuggets Box.
- Tracks included in specialized Nuggets compilations are noted in the Other column.
  - Tracks marked II appear on Nuggets II: Original Artyfacts from the British Empire and Beyond, 1964–1969
  - Tracks marked LP followed by a number appear on that volume number in the 12-LP Nuggets LP series

==== Nuggets: A Classic Collection from the Psychedelic Sixties (1986) ====
Artist	Title	Nuggets 2LP	Nuggets Box	Other	Notes
The Standells	Dirty Water	Yes	Yes	LP1	
The Seeds	Pushin' Too Hard	Yes	Yes	LP1	
Count Five	Psychotic Reaction	Yes	Yes	LP1	
The Chocolate Watchband	Let's Talk About Girls	Yes	Yes		
The Easybeats	Friday On My Mind			II	
The Five Americans	I See The Light		Yes	LP1	
The Standells	Why Pick On Me		Yes		
Syndicate of Sound	Little Girl		Yes	LP12	
The Monkees	Pleasant Valley Sunday				
The Knickerbockers	Lies	Yes	Yes	LP3	
The Beau Brummels	Laugh, Laugh		Yes	LP7	
The Troggs	Wild Thing				
The Easybeats	Heaven And Hell				
The Monkees	Valleri				
Nazz	Open My Eyes	Yes	Yes	LP1	
The Beau Brummels	Just A Little			LP7	
The Seeds	Can't Seem To Make You Mine		Yes	LP2	
The Amboy Dukes	Journey To The Center Of The Mind		Yes	LP1	

==== More Nuggets: Classics from the Psychedelic Sixties, Vol. 2 (1987) ====
Artist	Title	Nuggets 2LP	Nuggets Box	Other	Notes
Blues Magoos	(We Ain't Got) Nothin' Yet	Yes	Yes	LP1	
The Seeds	Mr. Farmer				
The Standells	Sometimes Good Guys Don't Wear White		Yes		
The Castaways	Liar, Liar	Yes	Yes		
Captain Beefheart and his Magic Band	Diddy Wah Diddy		Yes	LP6	
The Chocolate Watchband	Are You Gonna Be There (At The Love-in)?		Yes	LP2	
The Music Machine	Talk Talk		Yes	LP1	
The Merry-Go-Round	Live		Yes	LP4	
The Five Americans	Western Union				
The Nightcrawlers	The Little Black Egg		Yes	LP6	
The Parade	Sunshine Girl		Yes	LP3	
The Merry-Go-Round	You're A Very Lovely Woman			LP3	
The Left Banke	Desiree				
Boyce & Hart	I Wonder What She's Doing Tonight			LP3	
Mouse	A Public Execution	Yes	Yes	LP6	
The Standells	Try It			LP2	
The Chocolate Watchband	Sweet Young Thing		Yes	LP6	
The Easybeats	Gonna Have A Good Time				

==== Even More Nuggets: Classics from the Psychedelic Sixties, Vol. 3 (1989) ====
Artist	Title	Nuggets 2LP	Nuggets Box	Other	Notes
The Electric Prunes	I Had Too Much To Dream (Last Night)	Yes	Yes	LP1	
The Shadows of Knight	Gloria			LP2	
We The People	Mirror Of Your Mind		Yes	LP6	
Strawberry Alarm Clock	Incense And Peppermints		Yes	LP9	
Max Frost & The Troopers	Shape Of Things To Come		Yes	LP12	
The First Edition	Just Dropped In (To See What Condition My Condition Was In)			LP9	
The Woolies	Who Do You Love		Yes	LP12	
The Barbarians	Are You A Boy Or Are You A Girl		Yes	LP1	
The Knickerbockers	One Track Mind		Yes	LP4	
The Grass Roots	Let's Live For Today			LP11	
Danny Hutton	Roses And Rainbows				
The Cyrkle	Red Rubber Ball			LP3	
The Third Rail	Run, Run, Run	Yes	Yes	LP11	
Dino, Desi & Billy	I'm A Fool				
The Sunshine Company	Back On The Street Again			LP10	
The E-Types	Put The Clock Back On The Wall		Yes	LP4	
The Chambers Brothers	Time Has Come Today			LP9	
The Grass Roots	Only When You're Lonely			LP10	

=== Nuggets box sets: 1998–2009 ===
A series of Nuggets box sets have been issued.

- Nuggets: Original Artyfacts from the First Psychedelic Era, 1965–1968 (1998)
  - The first box set compiled the original two-LP sequence of Nuggets tracks, and 91 other tracks—some of which had been included on the 1980s 12-volume LP collection, many of which had not. All the tracks included in the box set were by American artists, recording in the mid to late 1960s.
- Nuggets II: Original Artyfacts from the British Empire and Beyond, 1964–1969 (2001)
  - This follow-up box compiled similar tracks that were from various non-American artists, also working in the late 1960s. Virtually all of these tracks were not previously issued as part of any Nuggets compilation.
- Children of Nuggets: Original Artyfacts from the Second Psychedelic Era, 1976–1995 (2005)
  - This third box consisted of music in similar styles to the original Nuggets tracks (garage rock, jangle pop, folk rock, etc.), but that were recorded mainly in the 1980s and early 1990s.
- Love Is the Song We Sing: San Francisco Nuggets 1965–1970 (2007)
  - This fourth box compiled tracks from bands working in and around the San Francisco area in the late 1960s.
- Where the Action Is! Los Angeles Nuggets: 1965–1968 (2009)
  - This fifth box compiled tracks from performers working in and around the Los Angeles area in the late 1960s. Both this box and the San Francisco box consisted almost entirely of material that was not compiled on previous Nuggets volumes.

=== Other single-disc compilations ===
Two single disc compilations of softer Nuggets material were issued in 2004. These compilations tended toward orchestrated, mildly psychedelic music, and did not feature a typical Nuggets rock or garage rock sound:

- Hallucinations: Psychedelic Pop Nuggets from the WEA Vaults (2004)
- Come to the Sunshine: Soft Pop Nuggets from the WEA Vaults (2004)

The above two CDs were reissued the following year with unchanged track listings, but with new titles and artwork:

- My Mind Goes High: Psychedelic Pop Nuggets from the WEA Vaults (2005)
- A Whole Lot of Rainbows: Soft Pop Nuggets from the WEA Vaults (2005)

The most recent Nuggets compilation featured tracks from performers working in Australia and New Zealand in the late 1960s, and very definitely focused on garage rock and similarly harder material:

- Down Under Nuggets: Original Australian Artyfacts, 1965–1967 (2012)

== See also ==
- List of garage rock compilation albums
- Psychedelic States
