= Nuggets: Original Artyfacts from the First Psychedelic Era, 1965–1968 =

Nuggets: Original Artyfacts from the First Psychedelic Era 1965–1968

Compilation album by various artists
- Released: October 2, 1972
- Recorded: 1964–1968
- Genre: Proto-punk; garage rock; psychedelic rock
- Length: 77:25
- Label: Elektra; Sire
- Compiler: Lenny Kaye

Various artists chronology
Nuggets: Original Artyfacts from the First Psychedelic Era 1965–1968 (1972)	Nuggets II: Original Artyfacts from the British Empire and Beyond, 1964–1969 (2001)

Professional ratings
Review scores
Source	Rating
AllMusic	5/5 stars
MSN Music (Consumer Guide)	A−
Encyclopedia of Popular Music	5/5 stars

Nuggets: Original Artyfacts from the First Psychedelic Era is a compilation album of American psychedelic and garage rock singles that were released during the mid-to-late 1960s. The album was created by Lenny Kaye, and produced under the supervision of Elektra Records founder, Jac Holzman. Kaye was a writer and clerk at the Village Oldies record shop in New York and later become the lead guitarist for the Patti Smith Group.

The project was initially conceived as a series of roughly eight LP installments focusing on different US regions, but Elektra convinced Kaye that one double album would be more commercially viable. It was released on LP by Elektra in 1972 with liner notes by Kaye that contained one of the earliest known uses of the term "punk rock".

It was reissued with a new cover design by Sire Records in 1976. In the 1980s, Rhino Records issued Nuggets in a series of fifteen installments, in 1998 as a 4 CD box set, and in 2023 as a 5 LP box set.

== Background ==
Kaye was unsure whether Elektra Records would put out the album, so he threw his favorite songs together and made them fit into a concept. Elektra hired lawyer Michael Kapp to track down the original artists and secure licensing. Speaking in 2017, Kaye reflected "I would've made it more 'garage rock' as opposed to these kind of weirder things, like Sagittarius or even the Blues Project. A lot of it falls outside the parameters of what we've come to define as garage rock."

Though there were plans for a second Nuggets volume, Elektra did not choose the option. According to Kaye, he supplied the label with a list of potential songs, but they were not able to obtain licensing for most and the project was cancelled.

== Legacy ==
Jon Savage, in his history of the UK punk rock scene, England's Dreaming, cites Nuggets as a major influence on punk bands and includes it in his essential punk discography, alongside Iggy and the Stooges' Raw Power and the Velvet Underground's White Light/White Heat. Eric R. Danton of Paste Magazine wrote: "Nuggets is an essential document that helped define a musical era while serving as a primary influence for so much of the punk and garage rock that followed."

Many other compilation albums took their cue from Nuggets, including the Pebbles, Rubble and Back From the Grave series. Nuggets spawned an entire cottage industry of small record labels dedicated to unearthing and releasing obscure but worthy garage and psychedelic rock music from the 1960s.

In 1998 Rhino brought the original LP to CD, reproducing the original song sequence and liner notes. However, rather than releasing a single-disc release of the original LP, Rhino put the original disc in a box set with three other discs, an extra 91 songs in total that were not on the original LP. Contrary to popular belief, many of the songs were American Top 40 hits: more than a third of the original Nuggets would fall into that category, while Rhino's expanded set featured such smash hits as "Incense and Peppermints" by Strawberry Alarm Clock (No. 1), "Louie, Louie" by the Kingsmen (No. 2), "Wooly Bully" by Sam the Sham and the Pharaohs (No. 2), "Little Bit o' Soul" by the Music Explosion (No. 2), and "Time Won't Let Me" by the Outsiders (No. 5).

"Louie, Louie", "Laugh, Laugh", "Farmer John", "Psycho", "The Witch", and the Gestures' "Run, Run, Run" fall outside the set's stated time frame of 1965–1968; "Louie, Louie" having been released in 1963 and the rest in 1964.

In Europe in 2006 Rhino released a remastered version of the album featuring the original 1972 tracklist on a single compact disc in a miniaturized replica of the original gatefold sleeve. However, unlike the original album the tracks were presented using their mono mixes. In 2012 the album was again remastered, this time directly from the same tapes as the original 1972 release, featuring mono and stereo mixes. Available in double LP and digital formats, this version included updated release notes from Kaye and Jac Holzman. In 2023, Rhino Records issued a 50th anniversary Nuggets LP box set that included the original double album, plus a Nuggets, Volume 2 compiled by Kaye for the re-release and featuring songs from his unissued 1973 Nuggets follow-up. The set also includes a single disc titled Also Dug-Its: Artyfacts from the Original Nuggets, also compiled by Kaye and described as a collection of songs considered for the original 1972 Nuggets anthology.

It was voted number 479 in the third edition of Colin Larkin's All Time Top 1000 Albums (2000). In 2003, the album was ranked number 196 on Rolling Stone's list of the 500 greatest albums of all time, maintaining the rating in a 2012 revised list. It was later ranked down at 405 on the 2020 edition.

== Track listing ==
=== Side one ===
1. The Electric Prunes: "I Had Too Much to Dream (Last Night)" (Annette Tucker, Nancie Mantz) – 3:02 (1966, No. 11) (Reprise)
2. The Standells: "Dirty Water" (Ed Cobb) – 2:50 (1966, No. 11) (Tower)
3. The Strangeloves: "Night Time" (Bob Feldman, Jerry Goldstein, Richard Gottehrer) – 2:35 (1966, No. 30) (Bang)
4. The Knickerbockers: "Lies" (Beau Charles, Buddy Randell) – 2:46 (1965, No. 20) (Challenge)
5. The Vagrants: "Respect" (Otis Redding) – 2:17 (1967, Uncharted) (ATCO)
6. Mouse: "A Public Execution" (Knox Henderson, Ronnie Weiss) – 3:02 (1966, No. 121) (Fraternity)
7. The Blues Project: "No Time Like the Right Time" (Al Kooper) – 2:49 (1967, No. 96) (Verve Folkways)

=== Side two ===
1. The Shadows of Knight: "Oh Yeah" (Ellas McDaniel) – 2:51 (1966, No. 39) (Dunwich)
2. The Seeds: "Pushin' Too Hard" (Richard Marsh) – 2:39 (1966, No. 36) (GNP Crescendo)
3. The Barbarians: "Moulty" (Barbara Baer, Douglas Morris, Eliot Greenberg, Robert Schwartz) – 2:37 (1966, No. 90) (Laurie)
4. The Remains: "Don't Look Back" (William McCord) – 2:45 (1966, Uncharted) (Epic)
5. The Magicians: "An Invitation to Cry" (Alan Gordon, James Woods) – 2:59 (1965, Uncharted) (Columbia)
6. The Castaways: "Liar, Liar" (Dennis Craswell, Jim Donna) – 1:56 (1965, No. 12) (Soma)
7. The 13th Floor Elevators: "You're Gonna Miss Me" (Roky Erickson) – 2:31 (1966, No. 55) (International Artists)

=== Side three ===
1. Count Five: "Psychotic Reaction" (Craig Atkinson, John Byrne, John Michalski, Kenn Ellner, Roy Chaney) – 3:09 (1966, No. 5) (Double Shot)
2. The Leaves: "Hey Joe" (Billy Roberts) – 2:53 (1966, No. 31) (Mira)
3. Michael and the Messengers: "Romeo & Juliet" (Bob Hamilton, Fred Gorman) – 2:02 (1967, No. 129) (USA)
4. The Cryan' Shames: "Sugar and Spice" (Fred Nightingale) – 2:33 (1966, No. 49) (Destination)
5. The Amboy Dukes: "Baby, Please Don't Go" (Big Joe Williams) – 5:41 (1968, No. 106) (Mainstream)
6. Blues Magoos: "Tobacco Road" (John D. Loudermilk) – 4:44 (1966, Uncharted) (Mercury)

=== Side four ===
1. The Chocolate Watchband: "Let's Talk About Girls" (Manny Freiser) – 2:45 (1967, Uncharted) (Tower)
2. The Mojo Men: "Sit Down, I Think I Love You" (Stephen Stills) – 2:25 (1967, No. 36) (Reprise)
3. The Third Rail: "Run, Run, Run" (Arthur Resnick, Joey Levine, Kris Resnick) – 1:57 (1967, No. 53) (Epic)
4. Sagittarius: "My World Fell Down" (Geoff Stephens, John Shakespeare) – 3:52 (1967, No. 70) (Columbia)
5. Nazz: "Open My Eyes" (Todd Rundgren) – 2:47 (1968, No. 112) (SGC)
6. The Premiers: "Farmer John" (Dewey Terry, Don Harris) – 2:29 (1964, No. 19) (Warner Bros.)
7. The Magic Mushrooms: "It's-a-Happening" (David Rice, Sonny Casella) – 2:47 (1966, No. 93) (A&M)

Nuggets, Original Artyfacts from the First Psychedelic Era, 1965–1968, Volume 2

== 1998 CD box set ==
=== Disc one ===
The same 27 tracks appear in the same order as the original double album.

=== Disc two ===
1. The Music Machine: "Talk Talk" (Sean Bonniwell) (1966, No. 15) (Original Sound)
2. The Del-Vetts: "Last Time Around" (Dennis Dahlquist) (1966, Uncharted) (Dunwich)
3. The Human Beinz: "Nobody but Me" (Ronald Isley/O'Kelly Isley/Rudolph Isley) (1967, No. 8) (Capitol)
4. Kenny & the Kasuals: "Journey to Tyme" (Jerry Smith/Mark Lee) (1966, Uncharted) (United Artists)
5. The Sparkles: "No Friend of Mine" (Jay Turnbow/Lawrence Parks) (1967, Uncharted) (Hickory)
6. The Turtles: "Outside Chance" (Warren Zevon, Glenn Crocker) (1966, Uncharted) (White Whale)
7. The Litter: "Action Woman" (Warren Kendrick) (1967, Uncharted) (Scotty)
8. The Elastik Band: "Spazz" (David Cortopassi) (1967, Uncharted) (ATCO)
9. The Chocolate Watchband: "Sweet Young Thing" (Ed Cobb) (1967, Uncharted) (Uptown)
10. Strawberry Alarm Clock: "Incense and Peppermints" (John Carter/Timothy Gilbert) (1967, No. 1) (Uni)
11. The Brogues: "I Ain't No Miracle Worker" (Nancie Mantz/Annette Tucker) (1965, Uncharted) (Challenge)
12. Love: "7 and 7 Is" (Arthur Lee) (1966, No. 33) (Elektra)
13. The Outsiders: "Time Won't Let Me" (Thomas King/Chet Kelley) (1966, No. 5) (Capitol)
14. The Squires: "Going All the Way" (Michael Bouyea) (1966, Uncharted) (ATCO)
15. The Shadows of Knight: "I'm Gonna Make You Mine" (Carole Bayer/William Carr/Carl D'Errico) (1966, No. 90) (Dunwich)
16. Kim Fowley: "The Trip" (Dennis Hardesty/Kim Fowley/Paul Geddes) (1965, Uncharted) (Corby)
17. The Seeds: "Can't Seem to Make You Mine" (Sky Saxon) (1967, No. 41) (GNP Crescendo)
18. The Remains: "Why Do I Cry" (Barry Tashian) (1965, Uncharted) (Epic)
19. The Beau Brummels: "Laugh, Laugh" (Ron Elliott) (1965, No. 15) (Autumn)
20. The Nightcrawlers: "The Little Black Egg" (Michael Stone/Chuck Conion) (1967, No. 85) (Kapp)
21. The Gants: "I Wonder" (Sid Herring) (1967, Uncharted) (Liberty)
22. The Five Americans: "I See the Light" (Norman Ezell/Mike Rabon/John Durrill) (1966, No. 26) (HBR)
23. The Woolies: "Who Do You Love?" (Ellas McDaniel) (1967, No. 95) (Dunhill)
24. The Swingin' Medallions: "Double Shot (Of My Baby's Love)" (Cyril Vetter/Don Smith) (1966, No. 17) (Smash)
25. The Merry-Go-Round: "Live" (Emitt Rhodes) (1967, No. 63) (A&M)
26. Paul Revere & the Raiders: "Steppin' Out" (Paul Revere/Mark Lindsay) (1965, No. 46) (Columbia)
27. Captain Beefheart & His Magic Band: "Diddy Wah Diddy" (Ellas McDaniel/Willie Dixon) (1966, Uncharted) (A&M)
28. The Sonics: "Strychnine" (Gerald Roslie) (1965, Uncharted) (Etiquette)
29. Syndicate of Sound: "Little Girl" (Bob Gonzalez/Don Baskin) (1966, No. 8) (Bell)
30. Blues Magoos: "(We Ain't Got) Nothin' Yet" (Ronald Gilbert/Ralph Scala/Michael Esposito/Emil Thielhelm) (1966, No. 5) (Mercury)
31. Max Frost and the Troopers: "Shape of Things to Come" (Barry Mann/Cynthia Weil) (1968, No. 22) (Tower)

Nuggets, Original Artyfacts from the First Psychedelic Era, 1965–1968, Volume 3

=== Disc three ===
1. The Hombres: "Let It Out (Let It All Hang Out)" (Bill Cunningham/John Hunter/Jerry Masters/Gary McEwen) (1967, No. 12) (Verve Forecast)
2. The Golliwogs: "Fight Fire" (John Fogerty/Tom Fogerty) (1966, Uncharted) (Scorpio)
3. New Colony Six: "At the River's Edge" (Walter Kemp) (1966, Uncharted) (Sentaur)
4. The Daily Flash: "Jack of Diamonds" (arr. Steve Lalor/Don MacAllister/Jon Keliehor/Doug Hastings) (1966, Uncharted) (Parrot)
5. Lyme and Cybelle: "Follow Me" (Warren Zevon/Violet Santangelo) (1966, No. 65) (White Whale)
6. The Choir: "It's Cold Outside" (Daniel Klawon) (1966, No. 68)
7. The Rare Breed: "Beg, Borrow and Steal" (Joseph DiFrancesco/Louis Zerato) (1966, No. 28, when re-issued as Ohio Express) (Attack)
8. Sir Douglas Quintet: "She's About a Mover" (Doug Sahm) (1965, No. 13) (Tribe)
9. The Music Explosion: "Little Bit O' Soul" (John Shakespeare/Kenneth Lewis) (1967, No. 2) (Laurie)
10. The E-Types: "Put the Clock Back on the Wall" (Alan Gordon/Gary Bonner) (1967, Uncharted) (Tower)
11. The Palace Guard: "Falling Sugar" (Lawrence Rush/Paul Leka) (1966, Uncharted) (Verve)
12. The Gestures: "Run, Run, Run" (Dale Menten) (1964, No. 44) (Soma)
13. The Rationals: "I Need You" (Ray Davies) (1967, Uncharted) (A-Square)
14. The Humane Society: "Knock, Knock" (Woody Minnick/Danny Wheetman) (1967, Uncharted) (Liberty)
15. The Groupies: "Primitive" (Robert Cortez/Norman Desrosiers/Peter Hendleman/Gordon McLaren/Ronald Peters/Steven Venet) (1966, Uncharted) (ATCO)
16. The Sonics: "Psycho" (Gerald Roslie) (1967, Uncharted) (Etiquette)
17. The Lyrics: "So What!!" (Christopher Gaylord) (1965, Uncharted) (ERA)
18. The Lollipop Shoppe: "You Must Be a Witch" (Fred Cole) (1968, Uncharted) (Uni)
19. The Balloon Farm: "A Question of Temperature" (Michael Appel/Edward Schnug/Donald Henny) (1968, No. 37) (Laurie)
20. Mouse and the Traps: "Maid of Sugar – Maid of Spice" (Ronnie Weiss/Knox Henderson) (Fraternity)
21. The Uniques: "You Ain't Tuff" (Knox Henderson/Lawrence Puckett) (1966, Uncharted) (Paula)
22. The Standells: "Sometimes Good Guys Don't Wear White" (Ed Cobb) (1966, No. 43) (Tower)
23. The Mojo Men: "She's My Baby" (James Alaimo/Paul Curcio/Steven Alaimo) (Reprise)
24. The Unrelated Segments: "Story of My Life" (Rory Mackavich/Ronald Stults) (1967, Uncharted) (HBR)
25. The Third Bardo: "I'm Five Years Ahead of My Time" (Rusty Evans/Victoria Pike) (1967, Uncharted) (Roulette)
26. We the People: "Mirror of Your Mind" (Thomas Talton) (1966, Uncharted) (Challenge)
27. The Shadows of Knight: "Bad Little Woman" (Tito Tinsley/Victor Catling/Roderick Demick/Herbert Armstrong/Brian Rosbotham) (1966, No. 91) (Dunwich)
28. The Music Machine: "Double Yellow Line" (Sean Bonniwell) (1967, No. 111) (Original Sound)
29. The Human Expression: "Optical Sound" (Jim Quarles/Jim Foster) (1967, Uncharted) (Accent)
30. The Amboy Dukes: "Journey to the Center of the Mind" (Ted Nugent/Steven Farmer) (1968, No. 16) (Mainstream)

Nuggets, Original Artyfacts from the First Psychedelic Era, 1965–1968, Volume 4

=== Disc four ===
1. The Chocolate Watchband: "Are You Gonna Be There (At the Love-In)" (Ethon McElroy/Donald Bennett) (1967, Uncharted) (Tower)
2. The Leaves: "Too Many People" (Bill Rhinehart/Jim Pons) (1966, Uncharted) (Mira)
3. The Brigands: "(Would I Still Be) Her Big Man" (Kris Resnick/Arthur Resnick) (1966, Uncharted) (Epic)
4. The Barbarians: "Are You a Boy or Are You a Girl" (Douglas Morris/Ron Morris) (1965, No. 55) (Laurie)
5. Sam the Sham & the Pharaohs: "Wooly Bully" (Domingo Samudio) (1965, No. 2) (MGM)
6. The Strangeloves: "I Want Candy" (Robert Feldman/Jerry Goldstein/Richard Gottehrer/Bert Berns) (1965, No. 11) (Bang)
7. The Kingsmen: "Louie Louie" (Richard Berry) (1963, No. 2) (Wand)
8. The Knickerbockers: "One Track Mind" (Linda Colley/Keith Colley) (1966, No. 46) (Challenge)
9. The Wailers: "Out of Our Tree" (Ronald Gardner/Kent Morrill/John Ormsby) (1965, Uncharted) (Etiquette)
10. Harbinger Complex: "I Think I'm Down" (James Hockstaff/Robert Hoyle) (1967, Uncharted) (Brent)
11. The Dovers: "What Am I Going to Do" (Tim Granada) (1965, Uncharted) (Miramar)
12. The Charlatans: "Codine" (Buffy Saint-Marie) (1966, Uncharted) (Kapp)
13. The Mystery Trend: "Johnny Was a Good Boy" (Ronald Nagle/Robert Cuff) (1967, Uncharted) (Verve)
14. Clefs of Lavender Hill: "Stop – Get a Ticket" (Travis Fairchild/Coventry Fairchild) (1966, No. 80) (Date)
15. The Monks: "Complication" (Gary Burger/Larry Spangler/David Havlicek/Roger Johnston/Thomas Shaw) (1966, Uncharted) (International Polydor Production)
16. The Sonics: "The Witch" (Gerald Roslie) (1965, Uncharted) (Etiquette)
17. The Electric Prunes: "Get Me to the World on Time" (Annette Tucker/Jill Jones) (1967, No. 27) (Reprise)
18. The Other Half: "Mr. Pharmacist" (Jeff Nowlen) (1966, Uncharted) (GNP Crescendo)
19. Richard and the Young Lions: "Open Up Your Door" (Larry Brown/Neval Abounader/Raymond Bloodworth) (1966, No. 99) (Philips)
20. Paul Revere & the Raiders: "Just Like Me" (Richard Dey/Roger Hart) (1965, No. 11) (Columbia)
21. We the People: "You Burn Me Up and Down" (Thomas Talton) (1966, Uncharted) (Challenge)
22. The Lemon Drops: "I Live in the Springtime" (Roger Weiss) (1967, Uncharted) (Rembrandt)
23. Fenwyck: "Mindrocker" (Keith Colley/Linda Colley) (1967, Uncharted) (Challenge)
24. The Rumors: "Hold Me Now" (Benson Turner/Norman Prinsky) (1965, Uncharted) (Gemcor)
25. The Underdogs: "Love's Gone Bad" (Eddie Holland/Lamont Dozier/Brian Holland) (1967, No. 122) (V.I.P.)
26. The Standells: "Why Pick on Me" (Ed Cobb) (1966, No. 54) (Tower)
27. The Zakary Thaks: "Bad Girl" (1966, Uncharted) (J-Beck)
28. GONN: "Blackout of Gretely" (Rex Garrett/Craig Moore) (1966, Uncharted) (Emir)
29. The Bees: "Voices Green and Purple" (Rob Wood/Tom Willsie) (1966, Uncharted) (Liverpool)
30. Davie Allan & the Arrows: "Blues' Theme" (Mike Curb/Davie Allan) (1967, No. 37) (Tower)

== 2023 box set ==
The first two LPs in the 2023 50th anniversary box set feature the same 27 tracks in the same order as the original double album.

=== Nuggets, Volume 2 ===
The Rhino Records press copy for the 2023 box set describes these discs as featuring 28 songs that Lenny Kaye had earmarked in 1973 for an unreleased second volume of Nuggets.

Side one

1. The Lovin' Spoonful: "Do You Believe in Magic" (Kama Sutra)
2. Love: "7 and 7 Is" (Elektra)
3. Syndicate of Sound: "Little Girl" (Bell)
4. The Balloon Farm: "A Question of Temperature" (Laurie)
5. The Swingin' Medallions: "Double Shot (Of My Baby's Love)" (Smash)
6. The Litter: "Action Woman" (Scotty)
7. The Music Machine: "Talk Talk" (Original Sound)

Side two

1. The Five Americans: "I See the Light" (HBR)
2. ? & the Mysterians: "96 Tears" (Cameo)
3. Richard and the Young Lions – "Open Up Your Door" (Phillips)
4. The Beau Brummels: "Laugh, Laugh" (Autumn)
5. Clefs of Lavender Hill: "Stop - Get a Ticket" (Date)
6. The Cherry Slush: "I Cannot Stop You" (USA)
7. The Mystic Tide: "Frustration" (Solid Sound)

Side three

1. The Gestures: "Run Run Run" (Soma)
2. The Choir: "It's Cold Outside" (Roulette)
3. The Myddle Class: "Free as the Wind" (Tomorrow)
4. Evil: "Whatcha Gonna Do About It?" (Capitol)
5. The Pleasure Seekers: "What a Way to Die" (Hideout)
6. The Gants: "Road Runner" (Liberty)
7. The Music Explosion: "Little Bit O' Soul" (Laurie)

Side four

1. The North Atlantic Invasion Force: "Black on White" (Mr. G)
2. Floyd Dakil Combo: "Dance, Franny, Dance" (Jetstar)
3. The Squires: "Goin' All the Way" (Atco)
4. The Lollipop Shoppe: "You Must Be a Witch" (Uni)
5. The Sonics: "The Witch" (Etiquette)
6. GONN: "Blackout of Gretely" (Emir)
7. The Monocles: "Spider and the Fly" (Chicory)

=== Also Dug-Its: Artyfacts from the Original Nuggets ===
Side one

1. The E-Types: "Put the Clock Back on the Wall" (Tower)
2. The Moving Sidewalks: "99th Floor" (Tantara)
3. Lothar and the Hand People: "Milkweed Love" (Capitol)
4. Anthony & the Imperials: "Don't Tie Me Down" (Veep)
5. The Dinks: "Nina-Knocka-Nina" (Sully)
6. Pearls Before Swine: "Drop Out!" (ESP-Disk)
7. The West Coast Pop Art Experimental Band: "I Won't Hurt You" (FiFo)

Side two

1. The Peanut Butter Conspiracy: "It's a Happening Thing" (Columbia)
2. The Rationals: "Leavin' Here" (A2/Cameo)
3. The Yellow Balloon: "Yellow Balloon" (Canterbury)
4. Link Cromwell (a.k.a. Lenny Kaye): "Crazy Like a Fox" (Hollywood)
5. Luke & The Apostles: "Been Burnt" (Bounty/Elektra)
6. The Koobas: "The First Cut Is the Deepest" (EMI/Columbia)
7. Wayne Cochran: "Goin' Back to Miami" (Mercury)
8. The Third Bardo: "I'm Five Years Ahead of My Time" (Roulette)

== The Nuggets series ==
In the mid-to-late 1980s, Rhino released a series of fifteen albums that bore the Nuggets name. The first twelve of these albums each focused on either a specific garage-rock subgenre or location, while the last three took a more global approach. This series provided much of the source material for the box set.

Rhino released Nuggets II: Original Artyfacts from the British Empire and Beyond, 1964–1969, a four-CD box set, in 2001. While the original Nuggets focused on the American scene, the second compilation shifted its focus to the rest of the world, collecting cuts from the United Kingdom (such as the Pretty Things and Small Faces), Australia (the Easybeats), New Zealand (the La De Da's), Canada (the Guess Who and the Haunted), Japan (the Mops), Iceland (Thor's Hammer), Peru (We All Together), and Brazil (Os Mutantes).

Rhino released two more compilations using the Nuggets title, Hallucinations: Psychedelic Pop Nuggets from the WEA Vaults and Come to the Sunshine: Soft Pop Nuggets from the WEA Vaults, in 2004. Both discs were released through Rhino's internet-only label Rhino Handmade in limited pressings of 7500 each.

Rhino also released Children of Nuggets: Original Artyfacts from the Second Psychedelic Era, 1976–1995, a four-CD set of recordings by bands influenced by the original Nuggets, in late 2005.

== Nuggets volume 2 ==
Lenny Kaye, who compiled the original Nuggets double LP set, also compiled a second volume that was never released. Many of the cuts appeared on the later Nuggets releases, but some did not. Below is the tentative track listing for Lenny Kaye's unreleased second Nuggets volume.

1. ‡ The Lovin' Spoonful – "Do You Believe in Magic" (Kama Sutra)
2. † The Outsiders – "Time Won't Let Me" (Capitol)
3. The Left Banke – "Walk Away Renée" (Smash)
4. †‡ Syndicate of Sound – "Little Girl" (Bell)
5. †‡ The Balloon Farm – "A Question of Temperature" (Laurie)
6. †‡ The Swingin' Medallions – "Double Shot of My Baby's Love" (Smash)
7. The Gentrys – "Keep On Dancing" (MGM)
8. †‡ The Music Machine – "Talk Talk" (Original Sound)
9. †‡ The Five Americans – "I See the Light" (Abnak/HBR)
10. ‡ ? & the Mysterians – "96 Tears" (Cameo)
11. †‡ Richard and the Young Lions – "Open Up Your Door" (Phillips)
12. †‡ The Beau Brummels – "Laugh, Laugh" OR "Just a Little" (Autumn) ("Laugh, Laugh" appeared in both box sets)
13. †‡ Clefs of Lavender Hill – "Stop-Get a Ticket" (Date)
14. The Rainy Daze – "That Acapulco Gold" (Uni)
15. † The Elastik Band – "Spazz" (Atco)
16. † The Mystery Trend – "Johnny Was a Good Boy" (Verve)
17. The Good Rats – "The Hobo" (Kapp)
18. ± The Yellow Balloon – "Yellow Balloon" (Canterbury)
19. †‡The Gestures – "Run Run Run" (Soma)
20. †‡ The Choir – "It's Cold Outside" (Roulette)
21. The Bobby Fuller Four – "I Fought the Law" (Mustang)
22. ‡ The Myddle Class – "Free as the Wind" (Tomorrow)
23. ‡ Evil – "Whatcha Gonna Do About It?" (Capitol)
24. ‡ The Gants – "Road Runner" (Liberty)
25. †‡ The Music Explosion – "A Little Bit of Soul" (Laurie)
26. ‡ The North Atlantic Invasion Force – "Black on White" (Mr. G)
27. ‡ The Monocles – "Spider and the Fly" (Chicory)
28. †‡ The Lollipop Shoppe – "You Must Be a Witch" (Uni)
29. The Kaleidoscope – "Just a Taste" (Epic)
30. †‡ GONN – "Blackout of Gretely" (Emir)
31. †‡ The Squires – "Goin' All the Way" (Atco)
32. ± Link Cromwell (a.k.a. Lenny Kaye) – "Crazy Like a Fox" (Hollywood)
- Tracks marked † were included on the 4-CD Nuggets box set.
- Tracks marked ‡ were included on Nuggets Volume 2 in the 2023 Nuggets box set.
- Tracks marked ± were included on Also Dug-Its: Artyfacts from the Original Nuggets in the 2023 Nuggets box set.

Additionally, the following tracks appear in the Nuggets Vol. 2 compiled for the 2023 box set:

- Love – "7 and 7 Is" (Elektra)
- The Litter – "Action Woman" (Scotty)
- The Cherry Slush – "I Cannot Stop You" (USA)
- The Mystic Tide – "Frustration" (Solid Sound)
- The Pleasure Seekers – "What a Way to Die" (Hideout)
- Floyd Dakil Combo – "Dance, Franny, Dance" (Jetstar)
- The Sonics – "The Witch" (Etiquette)

== See also ==
- Nuggets II: Original Artyfacts from the British Empire and Beyond, 1964–1969 – a box set of non-U.S. psychedelic rock released between 1964 and 1969
- Children of Nuggets: Original Artyfacts from the Second Psychedelic Era, 1976–1995 – the third box set in Nuggets series, compiling psychedelic rock released after 1975
- Love Is the Song We Sing: San Francisco Nuggets 1965–1970
- Hallucinations: Psychedelic Pop Nuggets from the WEA Vaults
- Come to the Sunshine: Soft Pop Nuggets from the WEA Vaults
- Where the Action Is! Los Angeles Nuggets 1965–1968
- Anthology of American Folk Music

== Bibliography ==
- Shaw, Greg (January 4, 1973). "Punk Rock: The Arrogant Underbelly of Sixties Pop (review of Nuggets)". Rolling Stone.
- Leland, John (November–December 1980). "The Ultimate Record Collector". Trouser Press.
