= Bump Me Baby =

Song by Dooley Silverspoon
- A-side: "Bump Me Baby Pt. 1"
- B-side: "Bump Me baby Pt. 2"
- Released: 1974
- Length: 2:35
- Songwriter: S. Casella
- Producer: Sonny Casella

US chronology
"(It's Got To Be) Now Or Never" (1972)	"Bump Me Baby" (1974)	"Let Me Be The #1" (1975)

"Bump Me Baby" was a 1974 single for soul singer Dooley Silverspoon. It was a hit in the UK as well as in some European countries.

== Background ==
Dooley Silverspoon recorded the single, "Bump Me Baby" part 1 bw "Bump Me Baby" part 2 which was released on Cotton 636WEA in the United States in 1975. It was produced by Sonny Casella who owned the Cotton label. With the attention it had gained via the discos and R&B stations throughout New York city, its first shipment of 10,000 copies had been sold out and another 15,000 copies were sold out.

It was noted in the 1 March issue of Record World that Cotton Records had pressed a four-minute version of "Bump Me Baby". This record was for discos only and was labelled as such. It also had a specially designed disco label. Arista Records were handling the distribution and shipping was imminent.

== Reception ==
It was reviewed in the February 1, 1975 issue of Cash Box. A Newcomer Pick, It received a positive review with the reviewer noting the attention it was gaining. The reviewer also credited the bass, the vocals and the "popping rhythms" for its popularity.

== Club and airplay ==
For the week of 8 March, the record was on DJ Lynn Cook's playlist at Bayou Landing in Atlanta.

== Charts ==
=== US ===
For the week of February 8 1975, the Cotton Records release of "Bump Me baby" made its debut at no. 70 in the Cash Box R&B Top 70 chart. Also that week, it debuted at no. 65 in the Record World R&B Singles chart.

For the week of 22 February, "Bump Me Baby" debuted at no. 128 in the Record World 101 - 150 Singles chart.

Having made it to no. 116 in the Record World 101 - 150 Singles chart for the week of 1 March, it would debut at no. 100 in the Record World Singles Chart for the week of 8 March. Also for the same week, It made its debut at no. 92 in the Cash Box Top 100 Singles chart.

It peaked at no. 24 in the Cash Box R&B chart for the week of March 29 and no. 82 in the Cash Box Top 100 Singles chart. And for the same week, it peaked at no. 92 in the Record World Singles chart, and no. 22 on the Record World R&B Singles chart.

=== UK ===
The Seville Records release made its debut on the Soul Chart as recorded by Music Week in the magazine's February 15 issue. The single was at no. 11 in the Record Mirror and Popswop Top 30 chart for the week of March 15.

=== Europe ===
The single spent a week in the German singles chart peaking at no 41. It spent nine weeks charting in the Netherlands, peaking at no. 4. It also charted for eight weeks in Belgium where at peaked at no. 7.
