= Dooley Silverspoon =

American soul singer (born 1946 or 1949)

- Born: Dooley Witherspoon; October 31, 1949 (age 75); Lancaster, South Carolina, United States
- Genres: Soul
- Occupation: Singer
- Labels: Seville Records, President Records, Cotton Records, Disques Carrere

Dooley Silverspoon is an American soul singer who had a number of hits in the 1970s. He is remembered for his hits "Bump Me Baby" and "Let Me Be the No. 1 (Love of Your Life)"

== Background ==
Dooley Silverspoon was born in Lancaster, South Carolina in 1946 or 1949 depending on the source. When he was thirteen, he moved to New York. His real name is Dooley Witherspoon.

His recording debut took place around 1972. He was known as Little Dooley at the time. He recorded some singles in Philadelphia. Later he came into contact with Sonny Casella who brought him success with his debut single, "Bump Me Baby". His singles were released on the Seville label which was a subsidiary of President Records.

His single "Game Players" has achieved a degree of popularity on the Northern Soul scene.

== Career ==
"Bump Me Baby"

Silverspoon recorded the single, "Bump Me Baby" part 1 bw "Bump Me Baby" part 2 which was released on Cotton 636WEA in 1975. It was produced by Sonny Casella who owned the Cotton label. With the attention it had gained via the discos and R&B stations throughout New York city, its first shipment of 10,000 copies had been sold out and another 15,000 copies were sold out. It was reviewed in the February 1, 1975 issue of Cash Box. A Newcomer Pick, it received a positive review with the reviewer saying, " infectious ditty is getting lotsa attention" and had put it down to the bass, the vocals and the "popping rhythms".

On the week of February 8, "Bump Me baby" made its debut in the Cash Box R&B Top 70 chart. It made its debut at no. 92 in the Cash Box Top 100 Singles chart on the week of March 8, 1975. It peaked at no. 24 in the R&B chart on the week of March 29 and no. 82 in the Top 100 Singles chart the same week.

Further activities

An article about Silverspoon appeared in the April 1, 1975 issue of Blues & Soul.

Silverspoon's self-titled album received a good review by Kevin Allen in the September 27, 1975 issue of Record Mirror. It was an album pick for that issue. It was released on Seville SEL 1. Allen said that there wasn't a lot of variety on the album but said that the whole package was extremely entertaining.

"Let Me Be the No. 1 (Love of Your Life)" spent three weeks in the UK national chart, peaking at number 44 in 1976. It also made the Tipparade chart in the Netherlands. Spending five weeks in the chart, it peaked at no. 4 on the week of February 4.

Silverspoon recorded "Closer to Loving You" which was released in 1977. It was released in a 12" format on Seville SEV 1025/12 Referred to as a fast soul song, it had a one star rating out of three which gave it chart possibility.

Silverspoon recorded the single, "Mr. Deluxe". It was released in the UK on President 11892 AT . It was also one of the Disco Picks of the Music Week, February 11, 1978 issue and was given a two-star rating which meant it had Disco Top 40 potential. On the week of February 11, 1978, Silverspoon's single, "Mr Deluxe" made its debut on the Music Week Disco Top 40 chart at no. 39.

== Later years ==
UK magazine, Tales From the Woods ran an article about Silverspoon in their no. 59 issue that was published in February, 2011.

His single "Game Players" which was a UK only single was included on the Mr M's ~ Wigan Casino Northern Soul Oldies Room 1974-1981 compilation in 2017. According to the notes on the CD, Silverspoon's song was taken direct from the master tapes for the first time.
