= Psychedelic States =

Psychedelic States is a series of 1960s psychedelic rock and garage rock compilation albums, each focusing on artists from specific states. They were released by Gear Fab Records. Several states had more than one volume representing them.

== States ==
- Georgia
- Florida
- New York
- New Jersey
- Illinois
- Mississippi
- Missouri
- West Virginia
- Alabama
- Maryland
- Arkansas
- Kentucky
- Wisconsin
- Colorado
- Texas
- Ohio
- Indiana
- North Carolina
- South Carolina
- North Dakota
- South Dakota

== Review ==
AllMusic reviewed the series, giving many of the albums an average of 2.5 to 3 out of five stars while others got 3.5 to 4.5 stars. One of their comments on the series is "Most of the rare and regional singles included in these compilations are badly recorded, poorly performed, and clichéd and derivative at almost every level, which, of course, is probably why they're so prized by collectors."

== See also ==
- Nuggets
- Pebbles
