= Skoog =

Electronic musical instrument

Skoogmusic
- Original authors: David Skulina & Benjaman Schögler
- Developer: Skoogmusic Ltd
- Release: 2008
- Stable release: Skoogmusic 1.5.1
- Operating system: Macintosh and Microsoft Windows
- Type: Special needs education, art installations
- License: Proprietary
- Website: http://www.skoogmusic.com/

The Skoog is a customizable electronic musical instrument that has been designed to be inclusive and accessible – especially to those unable to play conventional musical instruments. Its primary market is special education and music therapy.

The Skoog itself is a soft cube that plugs, via USB, into a computer running its accompanying software, which uses physical modeling technology to allow direct correlations between the expressive gestures the player makes on the Skoog and the sound that comes out of the software. The current version of the software features twenty one such instruments. The Skoog can also be used as a MIDI controller, as well as a sampler.

== See also ==
- Beamz – Laser-based music device System for making music by disrupting laser beams
