= The Gestures =

American rock band

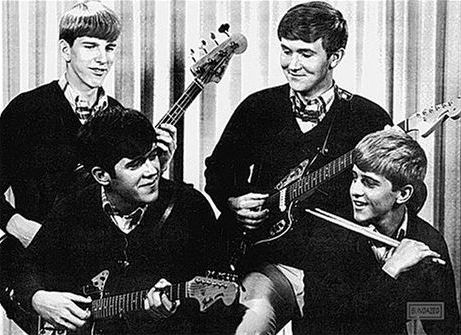
The Gestures

The Gestures were a teenage American rock band based in Mankato, Minnesota. The members of the band were Gus Dewey (guitar), Tom Klugherz (bass), Dale Menten (guitar/vocals), and Bruce Waterston (drums).

== History ==
The group was known as The Jesters, until they changed their name concurrent with the release of their first single. They are primarily known for their chart hit, "Run, Run, Run", from the fall of 1964. "Run, Run, Run" has been favorably cited by some rock historians as containing a Beatle-esque, British Invasion sound, with crisp guitar playing and a quick beat. The song came about in 1963 when Dale Menten decided to write original material for the band. In 1964, the band recorded a demo of the song to present it to a DJ on KTOE radio. The DJ favored the recording and it made it to Jim Madison, who recorded the song, along with three other tracks, with the band. On August 24, 1964, the band had a session at Kay Bank Studios in Minneapolis. Two weeks later they re-recorded "Run, Run, Run" with a faster beat. This version was used for the group's debut single.

"Run, Run, Run" was released on the Soma label in October 1964 and became a major hit in the Midwest. Nationally, the song hit number 44 on Billboard's Hot 100 chart on December 20, 1964. The song also reached number 60 on the Cashbox charts earlier in the month. On the Twin Cities charts it reached number one. In Los Angeles and Oklahoma City it peaked at number three. In 1965, the band made an appearance on American Bandstand, and then toured across the Midwest and Canada. Their single, despite being heard on Canadian radio stations, was not available in stores. They discovered their single was being back-ordered instead of being actually purchased.

The Gestures released only one more single, "Don't Mess Around" b/w 'Candlelight." It was almost as big as "Run, Run, Run" regionally, but didn't chart nationally since there was confusion over which side was the A side ("Don't Mess Around" was the initial A side but it flipped over soon after), and limited distribution by the small label. The group broke up soon after.

== Later history ==
"Run, Run, Run" has been featured on numerous compilations, most notably Rhino's 1998 re-release of Nuggets: Original Artyfacts from the First Psychedelic Era, 1965–1968.

In 2008, the Gestures were inducted into the Minnesota Rock & Country Hall of Fame.

The Gestures music was re-released on CD in September 2023.

Waterston died in 1996.

Dewey (born Daniel Gregg Dewey on January 19, 1946, in Mankato) died of laryngeal cancer on January 4, 2004, at age 57.

Both Menten and Klugherz still perform on stage today and have appeared at Gestures reunion shows.

== Band members ==
- Gus Dewey (born Daniel Gregg Dewey on January 19, 1946, in Mankato, died January 4, 2004) — guitar
- Dale Menten (born December 2, 1945 in Mankato) — guitar
- Tom Klugherz — bass
- Bruce Waterston (born 1948, died 1996) — drums
