= Shango (rock group) =

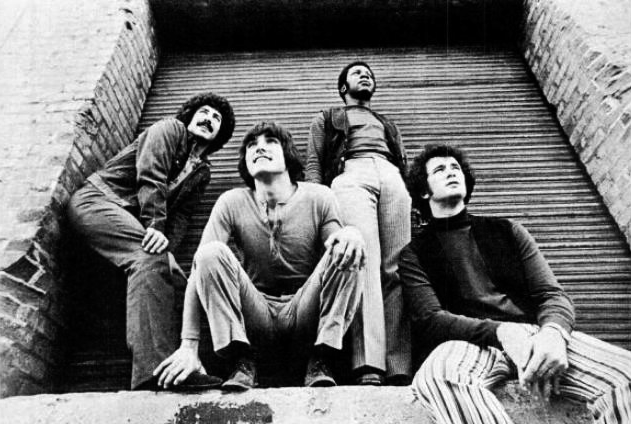
- Shango in 1970

Background information
- Genres: Pop, rock, jazz, new-age
- Past members: Tommy Reynolds; Richie Hernandez; Malcolm Evans; Joe Barile

Shango was an American rock quartet that recorded in 1969 and 1970. They are best remembered for their only Hot 100 chart appearance with the song "Day After Day (It's Slippin' Away)".

== Band history ==
The band debuted as Renaissance in 1968, with a one-shot single "The Hi-Way Song" on GNP Crescendo, which did not chart. Shortly thereafter, they changed their name to Shango. The full line-up consisted of Tommy Reynolds (keyboards, percussion; later of Hamilton, Joe Frank & Reynolds), Richie Hernandez (guitar), Malcolm Evans (bass), and Joe Barile (drums). Hernandez and Evans handled most of the vocals.

Shango's best-known recording was their debut single, a 1969 Caribbean-flavored novelty hit called "Day After Day (It's Slippin' Away)" from their self-titled album Shango on A&M. Produced by Jerry Riopelle and co-written by Riopelle, Stuart Margolin and Reynolds, it mocked contemporary doomsday predictions that California was destined to be destroyed (presumably very soon) by an earthquake. The track reached #57 on the Billboard charts in the US. It was actually a bigger hit in Canada, where it sneaked into the top 40, peaking at #39 on the Canadian RPM charts.

Subsequent A&M singles were flops. Shango was dropped by A&M after their first album, but picked up by ABC/Dunhill, and assigned to producer Steve Barri. They recorded an album for ABC/Dunhill; the album's lead (and only) single "Some Things A Man's Gotta Do" hit #107 on Billboard in July, 1970. The song also peaked at number 70 in Australia.

Shango dissolved shortly thereafter, with Reynolds moving almost immediately to Hamilton, Joe Frank & Reynolds. Barile went on to join The Ventures in 1973.

== Discography ==
- Shango (1969)
- Trampin' (1970)
