= Jerry Riopelle =

Musical artist (1941–2018)

- Born: May 5, 1941; Detroit, Michigan, U.S.
- Origin: Tampa, Florida
- Died: December 24, 2018 (aged 77)
- Genres: Rock, country, jazz, R&B
- Occupation(s): Musician, record producer
- Years active: 1960s-2018
- Website: www.jerryriopelle.com/jrbio.htm

Jerry Riopelle (May 5, 1941 – December 24, 2018) was an American singer-songwriter, musician and record producer born in Detroit, and raised in Tampa, Florida, and known primarily for his hard rock performances and for his record production. He mixed rock, country and jazz with R&B and was an inductee into the Arizona Music and Entertainment Hall of Fame.

== Early career ==
Riopelle began his music career in the 1960s in Los Angeles working as an independent record producer. He played drums for The Hollywood Argyles and later signed with Screen Gems as a staff songwriter. At Screen Gems, he wrote and produced, along with Clydie King, a single called "The Thrill is Gone" (not to be confused with the one made famous by B.B. King). This exposure helped Riopelle land staff writer and producer job with Phil Spector and Lester Sills label Philles Records.

Riopelle had his first charting record as producer of "Home of the Brave," which was recorded by Bonnie & The Treasures reached #77 on the Billboard Hot 100 in the summer of 1965. He later produced top 40 singles for The Parade (he was a member) and April Stevens & Nino Tempo. This led to an opportunity to work as an A&M Records producer and a role as a staff writer at Irving Music.

== Later career and death ==
Riopelle produced and wrote for The Parade, Brewer & Shipley, We Five, and Shango. His songs have been covered by Leon Russell, Herb Alpert, Kenny Loggins, Rita Coolidge, Meat Loaf, and others. Jerry also wrote various pieces for Hollywood TV shows and films.

Riopelle had a fan base in Arizona during the 1970s, and performed in New Year's Eve performances at Phoenix venue Celebrity Theatre, featuring a revolving stage. Acts opened for Riopelle on these occasions, including The Dixie Dregs.

In 2001, Riopelle invented and patented the Beamz device for creating music using lasers.

He died of complications from cancer on December 24, 2018, at the age of 77.

== Discography ==
Year	Album
1971	Jerry Riopelle: Released: Label: Capitol Records; Format: LP
1972	Second Album: Released: Label: Capitol; Format: LP
1974	Saving Grace: Released: Label: ABC; Format: LP
1975	Take a Chance: Released: Label: ABC; Format: LP
1994	Hush Money: Released: Label: Rhino Records; Format: CS, CD
1999	Tongue N Groove: Released: Label: The Orchard; Format: CD

=== Albums (vinyl) ===
- Jerry Riopelle - Capitol ST-732 - 1971
- Jerry Riopelle -(re issue) Capitol SM-732 - 1977
- The Second Album - Capitol ST-863 - 1972
- The Second Album -(re issue) Capitol SM-863 - 1977
- Saving Grace - ABC ABCX-827 - 1974
- Saving Grace -(Ariola Holland) ABC 27 205 ET - 1974
- Take A Chance - ABC ABCD-886 - 1975
- Take A Chance -(RCA Canada) - 1975
- Little Bit At A Time - Little Eskimo 7 - 1977
- In The Round - Little Eskimo 8 - 1978
- In The Round - (Ariola Holland) - 1979
- Dangerous Stranger - Little Eskimo 9 - 1979
- Dangerous Stranger - (Ariola Holland) - 1979
- Juicy Talk - Little Eskimo 10 - 1982
- Livin’ The Life (UK import)- See For Miles SEE 70 - 1986

=== Cassettes ===
- Little Bit At A Time - Little Eskimo LE 7 - 1977
- In The Round - Little Eskimo LE-C-8 - 1978
- In The Round (2 extra songs)*-Little Eskimo LE-CX-8 - 1990
- Dangerous Stranger - Little Eskimo LE 9 - 1979
- Juicy Talk - Little Eskimo LE 10 - 1982
- Hands On - Little Eskimo LE 11 - 1988
- In The Blood* - Indio LE-CDX 1122 - 1998
  - Note these cassettes made especially for Celebrity Theater New Year shows.

=== CDs ===
- Hands On - Little Eskimo LECD 11 - 1986
- In The Blood - Indio ICD-9303 - 1993
- Hush Money - Mesa R2 79078 - 1994
- Tongue 'n' Groove - Evening Star/Little Eskimo LE 2000 - 2000
- Tongue 'n' Groove (+In The Round) - Evening Star/Little Eskimo LE 2000X - 2000
- The Works 1970-2000 - Little Eskimo LE 2005 - 2005
- In the Round-Deluxe - Little Eskimo LE 2009 - 2009
