= Children of Nuggets: Original Artyfacts from the Second Psychedelic Era, 1976–1995 =

Children of Nuggets: Original Artyfacts from the Second Psychedelic Era, 1976–1996

Box set by Various artists
- Released: August 30, 2005
- Recorded: 1976–1995
- Genres: Neo-psychedelia; garage rock revival; alternative rock; power pop; jangle pop
- Label: Rhino
- Producer: Gary Stewart

Nuggets series chronology
Come to the Sunshine: Soft Pop Nuggets from the WEA Vaults (2004)	Children of Nuggets: Original Artyfacts from the Second Psychedelic Era, 1976–1996 (2005)	Love Is the Song We Sing: San Francisco Nuggets 1965–1970 (2007)

Children of Nuggets: Original Artyfacts from the Second Psychedelic Era, 1976–1996 is a box set compilation album of alternative pop music, released in 2005 by Rhino Records. The set consists of four compact discs of songs recorded between 1976 and 1996, with most of the recordings stemming from the 1980s. The title refers to the original Nuggets LP, which was first issued in 1972 and whose music influenced the bands featured on Children of Nuggets.

== Production ==
Children of Nuggets is the third box set in Rhino's Nuggets series. The first two sets focused on 1960s garage rock and psychedelic music, expanding on the track selection of the original Nuggets LP, which was compiled by Jac Holzman and Lenny Kaye and released in 1972.

The tracks on Children of Nuggets were chosen by Alec Palao and Gary Stewart and represent a later period. Palao writes in the liner notes that they were following Kaye's original objective which, he said, was to "compile together the good tracks from all those albums that only have one good track". The exact scope of the Children set is vaguely defined, a fact which has led some critics to express reservations about the concept, with one reviewer complaining that the compilers are trying to define an era that "didn't exist". The song selection gives particular prominence to the artists that formed Los Angeles' Byrds-influenced Paisley Underground scene in the 1980s, including Rain Parade, Dream Syndicate, the Three O'Clock, Green on Red, and the Bangles (recording under their earlier name, the Bangs).

== Critical reception ==
Professional ratings
Review scores
Source	Rating
Allmusic	4.5/5 stars
The A.V. Club	(favorable)
The Guardian	3/5 stars
The New York Times	(favorable)
Pitchfork Media	(8.6/10)
Pop Matters	7/10 stars

The set was broadly praised for its selections, and for avoiding well known songs other than "There She Goes" by the La's. Noel Murray of The A.V. Club wrote, "By the time the set hits its second disc, the programmers are lining up one obscure wonder after another, hitting a precipitous peak in the middle of disc three with the one-two of the Stems' molten power-pop anthem 'Love Will Grow' and the Spongetones' fractured Beatles homage 'She Goes Out With Everybody.'"

Comparing the selections with the tracks on the original Nuggets LP, Jon Pareles of The New York Times wrote, "As on Nuggets, the songs are terse and catchy, the equipment is vintage and distortion-happy, and the recording budgets sound minimal; girl trouble is still the perennial subject. The difference is a broad streak of self-consciousness, but it rarely takes the fun out of the songs." Alexis Petridis of The Guardian was more reserved, applauding the inclusion of the Bevis Frond's "Lights Are Changing" but adding "there's also plenty of dreary trad rock that smacks not of exploration, but retreat into stultifying conformity".

Joe Tangari of Pitchfork Media listed some artists whose work might have been included but was left off, specifically Television Personalities, 14 Iced Bears, the Chameleons, the Cleaners from Venus, and the artists from New Zealand's Flying Nun Records. Murray acknowledged the absence of the White Animals, the Woggles, 45 Grave and Let's Active.

== Track listing ==
=== Disc one ===
1. "Vanishing Girl" (The Dukes of Stratosphear) – 2:30
2. "Help You Ann" (Lyres) – 2:30
3. "The Real World" (The Bangles) – 2:35
4. "We're Living in Violent Times" (The Barracudas) – 2:47
5. "The Trains" (The Nashville Ramblers) – 3:07
6. "Seven Years" (Watermelon Men) – 2:47
7. "Strangers When We Meet" (The Smithereens) – 3:46
8. "Wading Through a Ventilator" (The Soft Boys) – 3:20
9. "I Can't Hide" (Flamin' Groovies) – 3:14
10. "The Girl from Baltimore" (The Fleshtones) – 2:30
11. "It's a Good Thing" (That Petrol Emotion) – 2:34
12. "She's Fine" (The Stems) – 2:35
13. "All My Life" (The Point) – 2:05
14. "Down at the Nightclub" (The Creeps) – 3:18
15. "(My Girl) Maryanne" (The Spongetones) – 2:43
16. "She Turns to Flowers" (The Salvation Army) – 2:33
17. "You Are My Friend" (Rain Parade) – 3:06
18. "Mr. Unreliable" (The Inmates) – 2:52
19. "(I Thought) You Wanted to Know" (Chris Stamey and the dB's) – 3:18
20. "She Don't Know Why I'm Here (single version)" (The Last) – 3:26
21. "There Must Be a Better Life" (Biff Bang Pow) – 3:05
22. "Slave Girl" (Lime Spiders) – 2:51
23. "I May Hate You Sometimes" (The Posies) – 3:23
24. "I Helped Patrick McGoohan Escape" (The Times) – 3:04
25. "It's About Time" (The Pandoras) – 2:22
26. "I Live for Buzz" (The Swingin' Neckbreakers) – 2:26
27. "I Want You Back" (Hoodoo Gurus) – 3:10

=== Disc two ===
1. "This Damn Nation" (The Godfathers) – 2:46
2. "Tell Me When It's Over" (The Dream Syndicate) – 3:33
3. "Whenever I'm Gone" (The Prisoners) – 2:47
4. "New Kind of Kick" (The Cramps) – 3:29
5. "And She Rides" (The Long Ryders) – 4:30
6. "Motorbike Beat" (The Revillos) – 2:22
7. "Tears (Only Dry)" (The Vipers) – 2:56
8. "25 O'Clock" (The Dukes of Stratosphear) – 5:05
9. "Don't Give It Up Now" (Lyres) – 3:36
10. "If and When" (Chris Stamey and the dB's) – 2:39
11. "Pabst Blue Ribbon" (The Untamed Youth) – 2:41
12. "There She Goes" (The La's) – 2:42
13. "Kingsley J." (Vibrasonic) – 4:33
14. "I Can Never Tell" (The Crawdaddys) – 2:44
15. "Make Me Stay" (The Green Telescope) – 3:06
16. "Everyday Things" (The Plimsouls) – 2:29
17. "I Wanna Destroy You" (The Soft Boys) – 2:53
18. "It's You" (Mickey & The Milkshakes) – 2:18
19. "Apology" (The Posies) – 5:14
20. "Lights Are Changing" (The Bevis Frond) – 4:56
21. "Ahead of My Time" (The Droogs) – 2:40
22. "Welcome to My Love" (The Funseekers) – 2:48
23. "Flowers in the Sky" (The Revolving Paint Dream) – 2:24
24. "Metal Baby" (Teenage Fanclub) – 3:39

=== Disc three ===
1. "The Unguarded Moment" (The Church) – 3:10
2. "I Can't Pretend" (The Barracudas) – 2:31
3. "Out of the Unknown" (Died Pretty) – 4:07
4. "L.A. Explosion" (The Last) – 2:27
5. "I'll Cry Alone" (Flamin' Groovies) – 2:14
6. "Sunspots (single remix)" (Julian Cope) – 3:32
7. "Hindu Gods of Love" (Lipstick Killers) – 3:22
8. "Death and Angels" (Green on Red) – 2:15
9. "Barbed Wire Heart" (The Sinners) – 4:00
10. "Pink Frost" (The Chills) – 3:59
11. "She Told Me Lies" (The Chesterfield Kings) – 2:18
12. "Beauty and Sadness" (The Smithereens) – 3:24
13. "Test Drive" (The Mummies) – 1:29
14. "Busy Man (EP version)" (DMZ) – 3:22
15. "Love Will Grow" (The Stems) – 3:15
16. "She Goes Out with Everybody" (The Spongetones) – 2:27
17. "Hypnotized" (The Plimsouls) – 2:55
18. "No Apology" (The Unclaimed) – 2:05
19. "God Knows It's True" (Teenage Fanclub) – 4:56
20. "You Keep on Lyin'" (The Hoods) – 2:32
21. "Don't Break Down" (The Sting-rays) – 2:49
22. "The World Has Changed" (The Fleshtones) – 3:10
23. "Baby What's Wrong" (The Cynics) – 2:28
24. "Psycko (Themes from Psycho and Vertigo)" (Laika & The Cosmonauts) – 2:24
25. "My Name is Tom" (The Jigsaw Seen) – 4:25

=== Disc four ===
1. "Gentle Tuesday" (Primal Scream) – 3:47
2. "With a Cantaloupe Girlfriend" (The Three O'Clock) – 2:52
3. "Like Wow - Wipeout!" (Hoodoo Gurus) – 3:12
4. "Bad News Travels Fast" (The Fuzztones) – 2:41
5. "Plains of Nazca (single version)" (Sun Dial) – 3:45
6. "Getting Out of Hand" (The Bangles) – 2:15
7. "Please Don't Tell My Baby" (Mickey & The Milkshakes) – 1:44
8. "One Half Hour Ago" (Rain Parade) – 4:12
9. "You're My Loving Way" (The Aardvarks) – 2:44
10. "Transfiguration" (Screaming Trees) – 3:55
11. "A Scandal in Bohemia" (United States of Existence) – 2:32
12. "Where the Wolf Bane Blooms" (The Nomads) – 2:15
13. "Cheated and Lied" (The Vipers) – 2:26
14. "Strawberries Are Growing in My Garden (and It's Wintertime)" (The Dentists) – 3:20
15. "Won't Need Yours" (The Tell-Tale Hearts) – 2:45
16. "Weakness" (Inspiral Carpets) – 4:18
17. "You'll Know Why" (The Miracle Workers) – 3:07
18. "Not My Memory" (The Unknowns) – 2:23
19. "Far Away" (The Prisoners) – 5:23
20. "Ain't That a Man" (The Optic Nerve) – 2:37
21. "Mink Dress" (Plasticland) – 2:50
22. "Tight Turn (album version)" (Raybeats) – 3:54
23. "One Way Ticket" (The Nerves) – 2:10
24. "Tracy Hide (cover version)" (Wondermints) – 4:48

== Technical personnel ==
- Alec Palao – compilation producer
- Gary Stewart – compilation producer
- Bill Inglot – sound producer, remastering
- Ted Myers – discographical annotations and research
- Matt Abels – product manager
- Tanya Welsch – product manager
- Lenny Kaye – godfather
- David Ponak – licensing
- Dave Schultz – remastering
- Steven Chean – editorial research
- Steven P. Gorman – photo research
- Sheryl Farber – editorial supervision
