= The Magic Mushrooms =

American psychedelic garage rock band

- Origin: Philadelphia, United States
- Genres: Psychedelic rock, garage rock
- Labels: A&M Records, Philips, East Coast Records, Hyperloop Records
- Past members: Ted Cahill; Dick Richardson; Stu Freeman; Charles Ingersol; Joe LaCavera; Josh Rice; Dick Richardson

The Magic Mushrooms were an American psychedelic garage rock band in the 1960s.

== Background ==
The Magic Mushrooms were originally composed of five students from the University of Pennsylvania in Philadelphia. They were:

- Joe LaCavera (Drums)
- Stu Freeman (Vocals and Guitar)
- Josh Rice
- Ted Cahill (Lead Guitar and Autoharp) (born Edward Napier Cahill; September 19, 1947 – March 16, 2020)
- Dick Richardson (Keyboards)
- Charles Ingersol (Bass)

The Magic Mushrooms came together shortly after they started their freshman year and practiced in the freshman commons until they started playing gigs. They named themselves the Magic Mushrooms after Allen Ginsberg suggested that name during an on-campus lecture in the fall of 1965. In the Spring of 1966, they were joined by Josh Rice (Vocals, Flute, Harmonica), who had been the lead singer of a competing band on the Penn Campus, and 2 or 3 months after Josh arrived, Dick and Charles left the band, and were replaced by Bob Grady and Chris Barbieri, on keyboards and bass, both of whom had been in a band with Stu for a couple years previously.

== Career ==
The band was heard by Sonny Casella while playing at Drexel University later in the Fall and he signed on as the Manager shortly thereafter. They played mostly around the Philadelphia area into the Spring of 1966, most of their bookings being arranged by their new manager.

Their first single, "It's A-Happening" was released in September 1966, which reached number 93 on the Billboard Hot 100 chart for one week in November of that year before dropping off. It was included on the Nuggets compilation in 1972.

"It's A-Happening" was written by Stu Freeman and Josh Rice. Sonny Casella produced, arranged and mixed the song. When Herb Alpert of A&M Records found out what "magic mushrooms" were, he pulled the record off the market because the band would not change their name.

They are not to be confused with The Magic Mushroom, a different American psychedelic garage rock band from San Diego who happened to release their one and only single (I'm Gone b/w Cry Baby) the same year.

== Discography ==
=== Singles ===
- It's A-Happening b/w Never More (1966)
- Look In My Face b/w Never Let Go (1967)
- Municipal Water Maintenance Man b/w Let The Rain Be Me (1968)
