= Richard and the Young Lions =

American garage rock band

- Origin: Newark, New Jersey
- Genres: Garage rock
- Years active: 1965–1967 2000–present
- Members: Mark "The Twig" Greenberg; Fred Randall; Lou Vlahakes; Rick Robinson; Mike Fornatale
- Past members: Bob Freedman; Marc Lees; Ricky Rackin; Jerry Raff; Norm Cohen; Richard Tepp (d. 2004)

Richard and the Young Lions were an American garage rock band from Newark, New Jersey. They produced a moderately successful single with their song "Open Up Your Door".

== History ==
The Young Lions originally performed under the name The Emeralds. The band members were Newark's first rock band to grow their hair long. After being discovered by Larry Brown, (a.k.a. L. Russell Brown), and Ray Bloodworth during a chance encounter in a Newark pizzeria and joining Bob Crewe Productions, the name was changed to Richard and the Young Lions.

The Young Lions managed to produce one minor hit with their song "Open Up Your Door", released on Philips in 1966. The song was written by Ray Bloodworth and Larry Brown, not by the Young Lions, and studio musicians were used for the recording, with Tepp's vocals the only contribution from the band itself. The band dissolved in 1967.

Despite being from New Jersey, Richard and the Young Lions were more popular in other locations like Detroit or Cleveland, with Michigan's WRKR radio station including them on a 2023 list of 1960s Michigan bands, stating that "['Open Up Your Door'] got SO much Michigan airplay ... that the band was thought to be from Michigan. Almost EVERY local garage & bar band had this song in their playlist."

Original lead singer Richard Tepp died of leukemia on June 17, 2004.

== Film ==
An independent documentary on the band was produced in 2004, entitled Out of Our Dens: The Richard and the Young Lions Story by James Hannon and Leon Leybs, and narrated by radio personality Pat St. John. It featured the group's history from their early days to their reunion shows in the early 2000s.

== Discography ==
=== Albums ===
- Richard and the Young Lions – Volume 1 (2018) – 2 original songs ("Nasty," "You Can Make It") and 9 remakes.
- Richard and the Young Lions – Volume 2 (2019) – 2 original songs ("Once Upon Your Smile," "Open Up Your Door") and 8 remakes.

=== Singles ===
- "Open Up Your Door" b/w "Once Upon Your Smile": Philips 40381 (number 99 on the Billboard Hot 100) (1966) (both US and Canadian pressings)
- "Nasty" b/w "Lost and Found": Philips 40414 (1966) (both US and Canadian pressings)
- "You Can Make It" b/w "To Have and to Hold": Philips 40438 (1967) (both US and Canadian pressings)

=== Compilation appearances ===
- "You Can Make It", their swan song, was compiled on Volume 12 of the Pebbles series in 1983.
- "Open Up Your Door" was featured on the 1998 four CD box set Nuggets: Original Artyfacts from the First Psychedelic Era, 1965–1968.
