= Beamz =

Laser-based music device

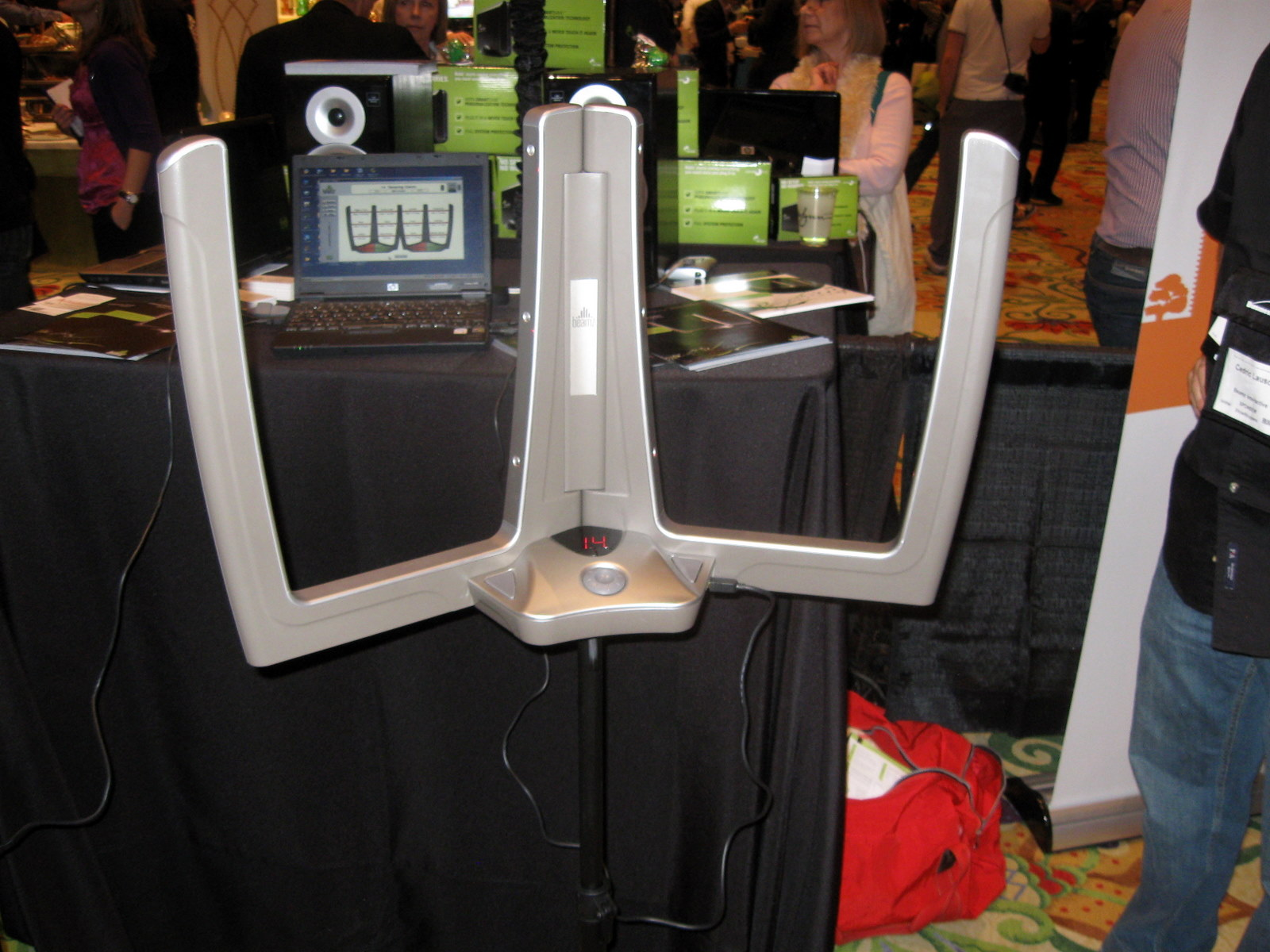
Demo at Showstoppers at Consumer Electronics Show 2010

The Beamz is a laser-based music device. It is a W-shaped table-top optical control device with several laser beams. Users operate the device by using their hands to interrupt the beams.

== History ==
The product was created by musician and record producer Jerry Riopelle, who began working on the device in 2001. Riopelle built the original prototype with PVC pipe and lasers, and later refined it with Todor Fay and Melissa Jordan Grey. to develop the software that controls the device.

== How it works ==
The Beamz system connects to a computer via USB. Each laser beam corresponds to an instrument or sound that the user plays by interrupting the beam. When the player removes his or her hand the sound stops. Even though the player's interaction with the lasers is random, the device ensures that the music will always be harmonious. Six laser triggers and two button-controlled triggers activate up to 64 independently controlled sequences of musical notes or events. When a laser beam is broken, the software program plays a musical note, event, or musical phrase that is always harmonious to the other sounds being played at that time. The Beamz product line is now in its third generation with a smaller footprint controller with four laser beams cross-platform compatible with PC, MAC and iOS devices.

== Users ==
In August 2010, Beamz was listed among the Best Tools for Schools by School Band and Orchestra Magazine, during the NAMM Show with the note that using Beamz was fun and a "great way to involve special ed students in music making."

== See also ==
- Skoog – Electronic musical instrument System designed to enable remote, synthesized music play
