= Sonny Casella =

- Occupations: Music producer, Music Executive, musician
- Instrument: Drums

Sonny Casella is a musician, composer and music producer. He managed the group, The Magic Mushrooms as well as produced their recordings. He composed and produced the hits "(Nobody Loves Me) Like You Do" for Jenny Burton and "Let Me Be the No. 1 (Love of Your Life)" for Dooley Silverspoon.

== Background ==
Sonny Casella was a staff producer for the Paramount Records section of Famous Music in the early 1970s.

His hit compositions include, "It's-A-Happening" by Magic Mushrooms (1966), "Ah, Ha, Ha, Do Your Thing" by The Hit Parade (1969), "(Nobody Loves Me) Like You Do" by Jenny Burton (1975) and "Bump Me Baby (Part 1)" (1975) and "As Long As You Know (Who You Are) (Part 1)" by Dooley Silverspoon (1975).

Casella also formed the companies, World Wide Music and Cotton Records.

== Career ==
In 1965, a record " I Keep Forgettin’" / "Ooh-Poo-Pah-Doo", credited to The Thornton Sisters was released on Cuppy 102. It was produced by Sonny Casella. One of the credited musicians who is now a doctor, Dr. Yvonne Thornton is adamant that she and her sisters did not participate in the recording of that song. It has been speculated that Cassella who was a producer for the label brought in a studio band to record the track. Sonny Casella and Donna Thornton of the Thornton sisters did co-write "Bad News" which was registered in 1965.

According to Cash Box in the magazine's July 29, 1967, issue, Casella along with Bill Smith and Otis Pollard were the three independent producers who were to each exclusively produce an act for the Mercury label. Casella's assignment was to produce the recordings of Philadelphia band The Magic Mushrooms.

Casella played drums on the self-tltled The Deirdre Wilson Tabac album that was released in 1970. In addition to composing seven of the album's ten songs, he also produced and arranged the recordings.

Casella composed and produced "Bump Me Baby" for Dooley Silverspoon. It was released on Cotton 836. It was reviewed by Record World in the magazine's January 18, 1975, issue. A single pick, the reviewer said that it mingled the sound patterns of "Rock the Boat" and "Rock Your Baby" with original melodic appeal. The reviewer finished off saying "his Silverspoon is born with a hit in his mouth. A Newcomer Pick, it was reviewed in the February 1, 1975 issue of Cash Box. Giving it a positive review, the reviewer noted that it was gaining a lot of attention. The following week with the title misspelt as "Bump In Baby", it made its debut at no. 70 in the Cash Box R&B Top 70 chart. On the week of March 1 with the title now corrected to "Bump Me Baby", it was at no. 58. It peaked at no. 24 on the week of March 29.

The July 5, 1975, issue of Record World reported that Casella was releasing "New York City Bump" by Black Rock. The song which went for nearly nine minutes featured a background of street and subway sounds that Record World said gave it " a fascinating cinema verite feel".

Casella's publisher Springfield – ASCAP was listed in the December 27, 1975, issue of Cash Box as one of the publishers hitting the Top 100 chart that year. He was also listed as one of the producers doing the same.

Casella wrote "Closer to Loving You" which was recorded by Dooley Silverspoon and released in 1977 on the Seville SEV 102. It was also released in a 12-inch format. The following year, Clem Curtis & The Foundations recorded their version which was produced by Bill Connor and Simon Cohen, and released in the UK on the Psycho label.

== Discography ==
Singles
Act	Release	Catalogue	Year	Notes
S.O.N.N.Y. Featuring Dooley Silverspoon and Jeanne Burton	"American Music (Made in the USA)" Part 1 / "American Music (Made in the USA) Part 2"	Cotton Records C6635	1976	
S.O.N.N.Y. Featuring Dooley Silverspoon and Jeanne Burton	"Am I Losing You? Part 1 / "Am I Losing You? Part 2"	Cotton Records C6636	1976	
