= Harbinger Complex =

American garage/psychedelic rock band

Background information
- Origin: Fremont, California, United States
- Genres: Garage rock; psychedelic rock
- Years active: 1963-1967
- Labels: Amber, Brent, Mainstream
- Past members: Jim Hockstaff; Bob Hoyle III; Ron Rotarius; Gary Clarke; Chuck Tedford; Jim Redding

Harbinger Complex was an American garage rock/psychedelic rock band from Fremont, California, who were active in the mid-1960s. In the years since their breakup, their work has come to the attention of garage rock fans and collectors and has appeared on several retrospective compilations including the Nuggets 4-CD box set. They are best-remembered for their 1966 song, "I Think I'm Down."

== History ==
The band began in 1963 in Fremont, California in the East Bay area, not far from San Francisco. They were founded by Bob Hoyle III and Ron Rotarius, who had begun playing guitar together several years earlier when they were in the eighth grade. The two continued to collaborate in high school, where, as sophomores, they recruited friends to put together a band called the Norsemen. In 1965, Hoyle was called, as a Naval reservist, to active duty in Vietnam. By the time he returned in 1966, the band, now called Harbinger Complex, had already been performing under the leadership of Rotarius. Upon re-entering, Hoyle became the band's lead guitarist, while Rotarius went to rhythm guitar. During Hoyle's stint in Vietnam, the band had brought in Jim Hockstaff, known for his "Dionysian exploits," to become the group's lead singer and front man. The other members were Gary Clark (bass), Jim Redding (drums), and Chuck Tedford (organ). Tedford left the band shortly thereafter, and would not appear on any of the group's recordings.

The band, who had developed a large following in Fremont, went to Golden State Records' studio to cut their first single released on the Amber label, “Sometimes I Wonder” b/w “Tomorrow's Soul Sound” in April 1966. These two songs, as with all of their subsequent recorded material, were written by Hockstaff and Hoyle (credited as "Hockstaff and Hoyle III"). Right around the time of their first single's release, they opened for Paul Revere & the Raiders, along with the Baytovens. In August 1966, the Harbinger Complex came out with their second single, “I Think I’m Down” b/w “My Dear and Kind Sir," which was released on the Brent label, and was recorded at United Studios in Los Angeles. Jim Hockstaff left the band in early 1967, and Gary Clark took over on lead vocals thereafter. Later that year, stereo and mono mixes of four songs recorded at United, including the previously released “I Think I’m Down” and “My Dear and Kind Sir," appeared on a various artists' compilation entitled, With Love: A Pot of Flowers, released by Mainstream Records, the parent label of Brent. By the end of 1967 the band had broken up. Bob Hoyle III died on May 6, 2003. Jim Hockstaff died on April 7, 2026.

Harbinger Complex's work has come to the attention of garage rock enthusiasts and collectors over the years and has been re-issued on several retrospective compilations, such as Mindrocker, Volume 10 and Nuggets, Vol. 12: Punk, Pt. 3. "I Think I'm Down" was included on the Nuggets 4-CD box set released in 1998 on Rhino Records.

== Membership ==
- Jim Hockstaff (lead vocals)
- Bob Hoyle III (lead guitar)
- Ron Rotarius (rhythm guitar)
- Gary Clark (bass)
- Chuck Tedford (organ)
- Jim Redding (drums)

== Discography ==
- "Tomorrow's Soul Sound" b/w "Sometimes I Wonder" (Amber 8999, Apr 1966)
- "I Think I'm Down" b/w "My Dear and Kind Sir" (Brent 7056, August 1966)
