= Joey Levine =

American singer

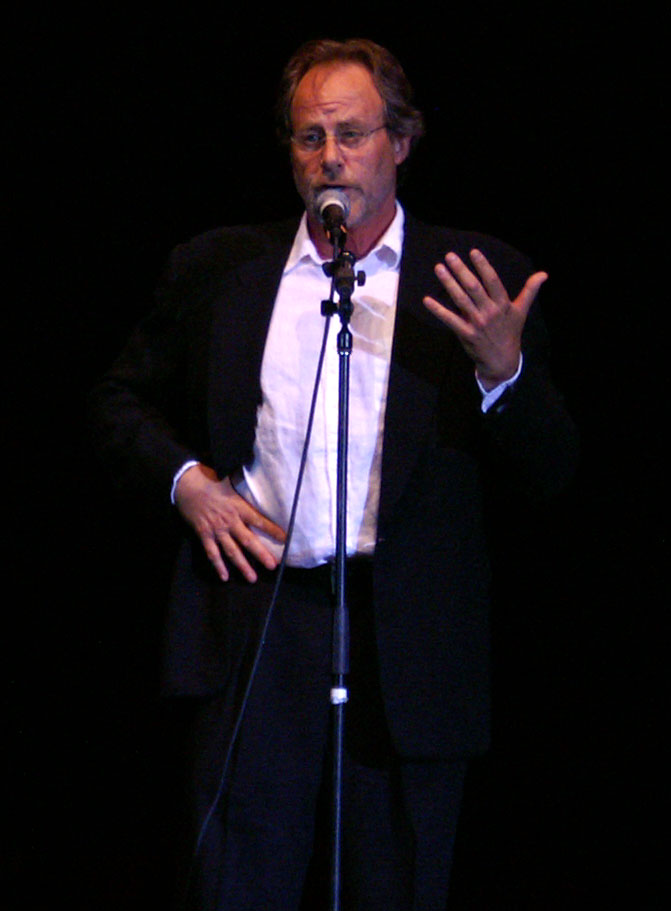
- Levine in concert in 2008

Background information
- Born: May 29, 1947 (age 79); New York City, New York, U.S.
- Genres: Pop; bubblegum pop; psychedelic pop; psychedelic rock
- Occupations: Record producer; songwriter; musician
- Years active: 1966–present
- Member of: The Ohio Express; The Third Rail; Reunion

Joey Levine (born May 29, 1947) is an American singer, songwriter and record producer of pop music, who has been active since 1966.

== Career ==
Levine sang lead vocals on several Top 40 singles including "Run Run Run" by The Third Rail (1966), "Yummy Yummy Yummy" (co-written with Artie Resnick), and three others by The Ohio Express (1968–1969), "Quick Joey Small (Run Joey Run)" by Kasenetz-Katz Singing Orchestral Circus (1968), and the record that best showcased his rapid speech delivery, "Life Is a Rock (But the Radio Rolled Me)" by Reunion (1974). He specialized in bubblegum pop.

Levine produced records for Super K Productions, run by Jerry Kasenetz and Jeffry Katz, who released many singles in the late 1960s by The Ohio Express, The 1910 Fruitgum Company, and The Music Explosion. Levine sang lead for various groups of studio musicians, whose songs were released under the name of actual groups of musicians, or sometimes the groups did not exist at all outside the studio.

Starting in the early 1970s, Levine began working on jingles for television commercials, as well as singing on them, with one of his most well-remembered jingles being "Sometimes You Feel Like A Nut" for Mounds and Almond Joy chocolate bars.

Levine founded Crushing Enterprises in New York City in 1969, and continues to write music for commercials and television. Popular campaigns from the past include: “Pepsi – The Joy of Cola", "Gentlemen Prefer Hanes", "Just For the Taste of It – Diet Coke", "Orange you smart, (for drinking Orange Juice)", "Come See the Softer Side of Sears", "Heartbeat of America – Chevrolet", "Dr Pepper – You Make the World Taste Better", "You Asked For It, You Got It, Toyota," "Who's that Kid With the Oreo Cookie," and "This Bud's For You" for Anheuser-Busch, and also the infamous "Proud as a Peacock" image campaign for NBC used from May 1979 to Summer 1981, Most recently he wrote the current Budweiser anthem, "This Is Budweiser, This Is Beer." In addition, Levine has also contributed songs, some of them with his 1960's bubblegum pop sound, to the PBS series Dragon Tales.
