= We the People (band) =

American garage rock band, 1965–1970

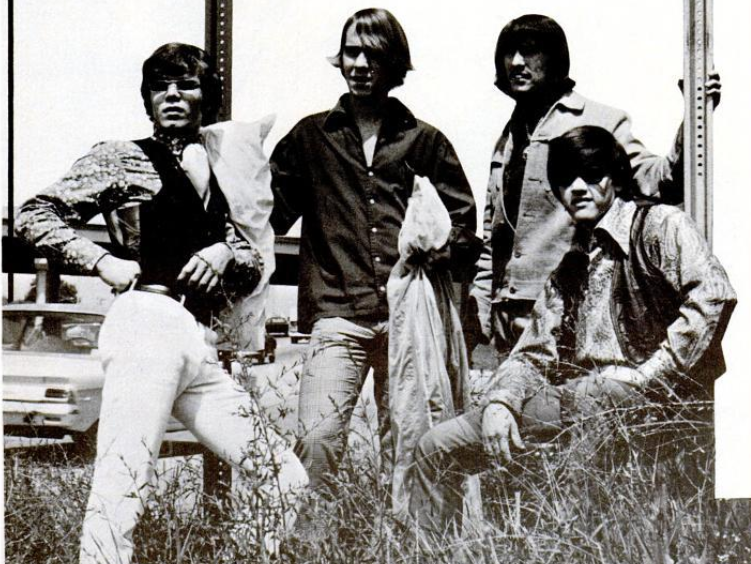
- We the People in 1967

Background information
- Origin: Orlando, Florida, U.S.
- Genres: Garage rock; psychedelic rock
- Years active: 1966–1970
- Labels: Hotline; Challenge; RCA; Collectables; Sundazed
- Past members: Randy Boyte; David Duff; Tommy Talton; Wayne Proctor; Tom Wynn; Lee Ferguson; Terry Cox; Carl Chambers; Skip Skinner

We the People was an American garage rock band from Orlando, Florida, that was formed in late 1965 and professionally active between 1966 and 1970. Although none of their singles charted nationally in the U.S., a number of them did reach the Top 10 of the local Orlando chart. The band are perhaps best remembered for their song "Mirror of Your Mind", which reached the Top 10 in a number of regional singles charts across the U.S. during 1966. The song has subsequently been included on several compilation albums over the years.

== History ==
We the People consisted of musicians drawn from a number of different Orlando-based garage bands. In the early 1960s, The Coachmen, a frat rock band who were a popular fixture at local college parties, merged with members of another local group, the Nation Rocking Shadows, to form The Trademarks. Then, in late 1965, Ron Dillman, a writer for the Orlando Sentinel, brought together members of The Trademarks and members of another local group, The Offbeets (formerly known as The Nonchalants), to form a garage rock outfit named We the People. The band were notable for having two talented and prolific songwriters, Tommy Talton and Wayne Proctor, with the latter writing most of the band's most popular songs.

With Dillman in place as the band's manager, We the People quickly released "My Brother, the Man" in early 1966 on the local record label, Hotline. The single was a Top 10 hit locally and gained enough airplay to enable the band to sign a publishing deal with Nashville-based producer Tony Moon, which in turn led to a recording contract with Challenge Records. The band's second single, "Mirror of Your Mind" (b/w "The Color of Love"), was released on the label in June 1966. The song is marked by the pounding drums, wailing harmonica, raucous vocals, and crazed fuzz guitar that characterized the band's signature sound. Although the single failed to reach the national chart, it was a big regional hit in a number of locations across the United States, most notably in Nashville and Orlando. During the 1980s, the song was also responsible for posthumously bringing We the People to the attention of music fans all over the world, when it was included on Nuggets, Volume 6: Punk Part Two, the sixth volume of the Nuggets series of albums.

"Mirror of Your Mind" was followed in September 1966 by "He Doesn't Go About It Right", which included "You Burn Me Up and Down" on the B-side. Like "Mirror of Your Mind", "You Burn Me Up and Down" has gone on to become one of the band's most famous songs, due to its inclusion on various garage rock compilation albums. We the People's fourth single, "In the Past" (b/w "St. John's Shop"), was released in late 1966 and featured the sound of a locally made musical instrument that the band used instead of the sitar, which was becoming popular on records at that time. The eight-stringed instrument, dubbed the "octachord" by the band, had been made by a friend's grandfather and looked like a large mandolin. The octachord was played on the record and at live concert appearances by the band's lead guitarist, Wayne Proctor, who thereafter kept the instrument in his possession. Despite "In the Past" being released as the band's fourth single, local radio stations preferred to play the softer B-side over the more psychedelic sounding A-side, which resulted in "St. John's Shop" reaching No. 2 on the local Orlando chart. "In the Past" was later covered in 1968 by The Chocolate Watchband on their second album, The Inner Mystique.

We the People suffered a major setback in early 1967 when songwriter and lead guitarist Wayne Proctor left the band and returned to college in an attempt to avoid the draft for the Vietnam War. The band issued a further three singles on RCA Records throughout 1967 and 1968 before the band's second songwriter, Tommy Talton, left in mid-1968. This departure, coupled with the expiration of their RCA recording contract, effectively ended the band's recording career. We the People limped on throughout 1969 and into 1970, until Ron Dillman decided to disband the group following a Halloween concert on October 31, 1970. After leaving the band, Proctor went on to write the minor hit "Follow the Yellow Brick Road" for The Lemonade Charade and later played with local bands in South Carolina. Tommy Talton went on to form the country rock/southern rock band Cowboy with Scott Boyer and was consequently the only member of We the People to have a professional music career after the 1960s.

== Later releases ==
Although We the People did not release an album during the 1960s, a handful of compilations by the band have appeared over the years. The first of these, Declaration of Independence, was issued in 1983 by Eva Records and later re-released on CD by Collectables Records in 1993. Declaration of Independence consists of tracks that originally appeared on the band's singles. In 1998 Sundazed Music released an exhaustive 2-CD retrospective titled Mirror of Our Minds, which again featured the band's singles along with previously unreleased material and songs by other related bands. This was followed in 2007 by a limited edition vinyl-only LP release titled In the Past, which appeared on the South Korean label, Wohn Records. In 2008, Sundazed issued a second compilation, titled Too Much Noise, which brought together tracks from the band's Challenge Records era in an approximation of an official album, as it might have appeared had the band released one during the 1960s.

== Cover versions ==
Their single "My Brother, the Man" was covered by the garage rock revival band The Fuzztones, and reworked by The Horrors with the song "Count in Fives". Spanish garage band Wau y los Arrrghs!!! released a Spanish-language version of the song with different lyrics entitled "Niña", on their 2005 album Cantan en Español. In 1995, a laundry detergent television commercial broadcast on the ABC network used the distinct guitar riff from the song.

== Band members ==
- Randy Boyte – organ, vocals (1966–1970)
- David Duff – bass (1966–1970)
- Tommy Talton – guitar (1966–1968; died 2023)
- Wayne Proctor – lead guitar (1966–1967; died 2026)
- Tom Wynn – drums (1966)
- Lee Ferguson – drums (1966–1967)
- Terry Cox – drums (1967–1970)
- Carl Chambers – guitar (1968–1969)
- Skip Skinner – guitar (1969–1970)

== Discography ==
=== Singles ===
- "My Brother, the Man"/"Proceed with Caution" (Hotline 3680) 1966
- "Mirror of Your Mind"/"The Color of Love" (Challenge 59333) 1966
- "He Doesn't Go About It Right"/"You Burn Me Up and Down" (Challenge 59340) 1966
- "In the Past"/"St. John's Shop" (Challenge 59351) 1966
- "Follow Me Back to Louisville"/"Fluorescent Hearts" (RCA Victor 47-9292) 1967
- "Love Is a Beautiful Thing"/"The Day She Dies" (RCA Victor 47-9393) 1967
- "Ain't Gonna Find Nobody (Better Than You)"/"When I Arrive" (RCA Victor 47-9498) 1968

=== Compilation albums ===
- Declaration of Independence (Eva 12009) 1983
- Declaration of Independence [reissue] (Collectibles COL-CD-0532) 1993
- Mirror of Our Minds (Sundazed SC 11056) 1998
- In the Past (Wohn WHNLP009) 2007
- Too Much Noise (Sundazed SC 6258) 2008
