= The Underdogs (American band) =

American garage rock band

Background information
- Origin: Grosse Pointe, Michigan, United States
- Genres: Garage rock; psychedelic rock; soul
- Years active: 1964–1967
- Labels: Hideout; Reprise; VIP
- Past members: Dave Whitehouse; Chuck Shermetaro; Steve Perrin; Chris Lena; Jack Louisell; Michael Morgan; Tony Roumell

The Underdogs were an American garage rock band from Grosse Pointe, Michigan who were active in the 1960s. They became a regular attraction at the Hideout, a club that was an early venue for acts such as Bob Seger, Glenn Frey, and The Pleasure Seekers, featuring Suzi Quatro, and it also served as the home to the Hideout record label, which released several of the Underdogs' singles. The group enjoyed success in the region and came close to breaking nationally with two records released through a joint deal on Reprise Records and then their last on Motown. The Underdogs' work has been included on various garage rock compilations such as the 1998 Nuggets 4-CD box set released on Rhino Records.

== History ==
Inspired by the success of English bands such as the Beatles and the Rolling Stones, the Underdogs were formed in 1964 by several Grosse Pointe, Michigan high school students led by Dave Whitehouse. Their initial lineup consisted of Whitehouse on lead vocals and bass, Chuck Shermetaro on lead guitar, Chris Lena on rhythm guitar, and Michael Morgan on drums. They started playing at the Hideout, a teen dance club, in Harper Woods, Michigan which was started in 1963 by Dave Leone, who at the time was a college student, and Ed "Punch" Andrews'. The Hideout eventually came to house a record company, after its featured acts became so popular that the club's owners decided to record and merchandize the groups. Several of the other regular acts at the Hideout were Bob Seger & the Last Herd, the Fugitives, Doug Brown & the Omens, the Heavy Metal Kids (featuring future member of the Eagles Glenn Frey), the Pleasure Seekers, featuring Suzi Quatro, and Ted Nugent's band the Lourds. Admission at the club was only one dollar.

In 1965, The Underdogs cut the Hideout label's first single, "Man in the Glass". The flip side was "Judy Be Mine (Friday at the Hideout)", which the Romantics would later re-record in the 1980s. "Man in the Glass" did well enough locally for Hideout to enter into a joint agreement with Reprise Records for mass distribution. However, Reprise put a stop to the single's promotion and circulation when they found out that the lyrics had been taken from an Alcoholics Anonymous poem. The poem was originally written by Peter Dale Wimbrow, Sr. In spite of the controversy surrounding "Man in the Glass", Hideout issued a sampler LP later that year featuring both sides of the Underdogs' last single plus two new cuts, "Surprise, Surprise", which had been previously recorded by the Rolling Stones, and "Get Down on Your Knees" written by Bob Seger, along with Dave Leone and band member Dave Whitehouse. In late 1965, Chuck Shermetaro left the band and was replaced by Tony Roumell on lead guitar. In 1966 they released another single "Little Girl" b/w "Don't Pretend", which like their last 45, came out on Hideout first, then Reprise, except that this time there was no controversy to interfere with its distribution. The single did well in the local market but did not catch on nationally. Seger originally wrote "East Side Story" for The Underdogs, but because Hideout was dissatisfied with their version, he proceeded to record it himself with the Heard. In September 1966, Jack Louisell and Steve Perrin left the band to attend college and the band continued as a four piece outfit.

Reprise was now out of the picture, but the Underdogs' hometown popularity attracted the interest of Motown Records who signed them to a deal with their VIP label. The Underdogs were reportedly the first white band signed by Motown. In 1966 the band cut a remake of Holland-Dozier-Holland's "Love's Gone Bad" for VIP, which was originally recorded by Chris Clark. The song failed to sell up to Motown's standards, reaching only #122 in the charts. The B-side was a remake of "MoJo Hanna" written by their producer at VIP Clarence Paul, along with Bunny Paul and Faye Hale—it was first recorded by Henry Lumpkin and redone by many artists including Marvin Gaye, the Ideals, Tammi Lynn, Esther Phillips, and the Neville Brothers. They also recorded several unreleased songs for Motown including "The Way You Do the Things You Do". Eventually the Grande Ballroom superseded the Hideout as the hottest teen club in the Detroit area, simultaneously coinciding with the Underdogs retreat from the music scene and breakup. When Hideout co-owner Leone got drafted, it marked the end of the club. He later became a booking agent for Ted Nugent and others before his death of a heart attack on October 5, 1999. Punch Andrews, Leone's Hideout co-partner was the longtime manager of Bob Seger, and has managed Kid Rock.

The Underdogs' work has attracted the interest of Garage rock collectors and enthusiasts and has been included on several compilations, such as Friday At The Hideout: Boss Detroit Garage 1964-67, which features several bands who recorded for Hideout Records, and includes six tracks by the Underdogs including their early classic singles “The Man In The Glass”, "Judy Be Mine" (a.k.a. "Friday Night At The Hideout") and “Get Down On Your Knees”. The Underdogs work has also appeared on the double LP, Michigan Nuggets, issued by Belvedere Records. The Underdogs version of "Love's Gone Bad" was included on Rhino Records' 1998 deluxe 4-CD box set edition of Nuggets: Original Artyfacts from the First Psychedelic Era, 1965–1968.

10 previously unreleased tracks were included in the Motown Unreleased 1967 compilation, available on Apple Music and other streaming services.

== Membership ==
- Dave Whitehouse (bass, vocals) (April 13, 1949 – February 6, 2023)
- Chuck Shermetaro (lead guitar)
- Steve Perrin (rhythm guitar)
- Chris Lena (rhythm guitar)
- Jack Louisell (keyboards)
- Michael Morgan (drums) (December 9, 1948 – March 28, 2008)
- Tony Roumell (lead guitar)

== Discography ==
- "Man in the Glass" b/w "Judy be Mine" (Hideout 1001, June 1965) (Reprise 0420, September 1965, US Cash Box # 133)
- "Little Girl" b/w "Don't Pretend" (Hideout 1004, November 1965) (Reprise 1446 January 1966)
- "Surprise, Surprise" b/w "Get Down on Your Knees" (Hideout 1011, May 1966)
- "Love's Gone Bad" b/w "Mojo Hanna" (VIP 25040, January 1967, US Billboard # 122)
