= Come to the Sunshine: Soft Pop Nuggets from the WEA Vaults =

Compilation album by various artists
- Released: March 11, 2004
- Genres: Sunshine pop, psychedelic pop
- Label: Rhino
- Producer: Andrew Sandoval

Nuggets chronology
Hallucinations: Psychedelic Pop Nuggets from the WEA Vaults (2004)	Come to the Sunshine: Soft Pop Nuggets from the WEA Vaults (2004)	Children of Nuggets: Original Artyfacts from the Second Psychedelic Era, 1976–1995 (2005)

Professional ratings
Review scores
Source	Rating
Allmusic	link

Come to the Sunshine: Soft Pop Nuggets from the WEA Vaults is a 2004 compilation album released by Rhino Handmade, one of two new compilations using the Nuggets name.

The title comes from the first track "Come to the Sunshine", performed by Harpers Bizarre. As the title suggests, all 24 tracks were taken from the library of the Warner Music Group. The labels represented in this release are Atco, Colgems, Cotillion, Jubilee, Loma, Reprise, Valiant, and Warner Bros. Records.

The compilation was produced by Andrew Sandoval who created a radio series based around the collection. The program features 45's like the ones included on Come to the Sunshine: Soft Pop Nuggets from the WEA Vaults but expands the concept out to feature 1960s releases from every label.

The album was later re-released in the United Kingdom with a slightly revised track listing under the name "A Whole Lot of Rainbows", the title referring to the song by the Salt. Some of the songs were changed owing to EMI's ownership of some of the selections. The Street Corner Society's "Summer Days, Summer Nights" was replaced by Jan & Dean's "I Know My Mind," and The Coronado's "Trip To Loveland" was substituted with "The Sound Of Children" by The Aliis.

== Track listing ==
1. "Come to the Sunshine" (Harpers Bizarre) - 2:34
2. "Candy Apple, Cotton Candy" (Pat Shannon) - 2:10
3. "A Whole Lot of Rainbows" (The Salt) - 2:55
4. "Love-In" (The Morning Glories) - 2:38
5. "Talking to the Flowers" (Everly Brothers) - 2:55
6. "Our Dream" (The Munx) - 2:36
7. "Take My Hand" (Lee Mallory) - 2:22
8. "Come on In" (The Association) - 3:16
9. "Just What I've Been Looking For" (The Vogues) - 2:38
10. "Silver and Sunshine (How Wonderful Is Our Love)" (The Looking Glass) - 2:01
11. "Happiness" (Anita Kerr & The Anita Kerr Singers) - 2:01
12. "If You Know What I Mean" (The Gas Company) - 2:28
13. "Wounded" (The Cookies) - 2:53
14. "Hung Up on Love" (The Other Voices) - 2:32
15. "For All That I Am" (The Tokens) - 2:22
16. "Summer Days, Summer Nights" (The Street Corner Society) - 2:11
17. "Discrepancy" (The Bonniwell Music Machine) -2:35
18. "Scorpio Red" (The Holy Mackerel) - 3:06
19. "Beverly Hills" (Uncle Sound) - 3:28
20. "Tell Someone That You Love Them" (Dino, Desi & Billy) - 2:16
21. "Time to Love" (Addrisi Brothers) - 3:03
22. "Someday Man" (The Monkees) - 2:38
23. "Trip to Loveland" (The Coronados) - 2:59
24. "No One was There (Requiem)" (The Gates Of Eden) - 2:36
