= The E-Types =

Sixties rock band from California

Background information
- Also known as: The "E" Types; Charolette Wood
- Genres: Garage rock; pop rock; psychedelic pop
- Years active: 1965 - 1968
- Labels: Link; Dot; Sunburst; Tower; Colstar
- Past members: Bob Wence; Don Sheppard; Danny Monigold; Jody Wence; Reggie Shaffer; Larry Hosford; Terry Shehorn

The E-Types (also known as The "E" Types) were an American garage rock band formed in Salinas, California, in 1965. The group's sound combined striking three-part vocal harmonies and Jody Wence's jangling keyboards, with professional production techniques that were outside of the garage band norm. During the E-Types' recording career, the band released five singles, including their most notable record "Put the Clock Back on the Wall". Although the band was short-lived, the E-Types had a profound presence in San Francisco's live scene and, years after their disbandment, the group recorded a reunion album.

== History ==
Formed in 1965, the E-Types featured Bob Wence (lead vocals, rhythm guitar), Don Sheppard (lead guitar), Danny Monigold (bass guitar), Jody Wence (keyboards) and Reggie Shaffer (drums), all of whom had some past experience in various folk rock bands. The group's pop-oriented blend of British Invasion and Byrds-esque garage rock, coupled with polished musicianship quickly secured the E-Types' popularity among the San Jose teen community, which bestowed upon the band the title of "Salinas Beatles". Taking notice of the group's notoriety, a friend of the band and occasional backup guitarist, Larry Hosford, offered the E-Types two of his own self-penned songs "I Can't Do It" and "Long Before" for their debut single. After the single was released on Link Records, it achieved considerable airplay, and came to the attention of Dot Records, which distributed it nationally on its own label.

The E-Types' next single "She Moves Me", recorded with producer Ed Cobb and released on Sunburst Records, also received some spins on the radio, which was followed by the group's performance of the song on Dick Clark's Where the Action Is. Its B-side, "Love of the Loved", is a cover version of an early Lennon-McCartney composition, demoed by the Beatles, but never officially released by the Fab Four until the release of the I Saw Her Standing There compilation album in 1992. During this time, the band embarked on a tour across California, establishing themselves as a live favorite with San Francisco and San Jose hippies. The E-Types often headlined shows with ? and the Mysterians, Paul Revere and the Raiders, and Jefferson Airplane, while breaking an attendance record at Santa Cruz's Coconut Grove (later broken again by the Everly Brothers).

In 1967, the E-Types released their third single "Put the Clock Back on the Wall", a regionally favorite song which received national airplay. Penned by songwriters Alan Gordon and Gary Bonner (best known for writing "Happy Together" by the Turtles"), "Put the Clock Back on the Wall" is described by critic Beverly Paterson as a psychedelic pop classic "bristled with tight orchestration, circled by the E-Types' signature pitch of right on choruses". The song is well-documented on compilation albums, including Off the Wall, Nuggets, Volume 4, and the 1998 expanded version of Nuggets: Original Artyfacts from the First Psychedelic Era, 1965–1968. Another single, "Big City", was distributed on Uptown Records later in the year, but Sheppards' recurrent illness and mismanagement of the band led to line-up changes in 1968. Sheppard and Monigold left the E-Types and were replaced by Terry Shehorn and Larry Hosford respectively. Under the recording alias Charolette Wood, the group released "Friendly Indians" before disbanding at the end of 1968.

In 1995, Sundazed Music released Introducing...The E-Types, an album which contains released material, demos, and live performances. Bob Wence, Monigold, and Shaffer arranged a reunion tour in 1998, and released the studio album Chase the Moon later in the year.
