= The Daily Flash =

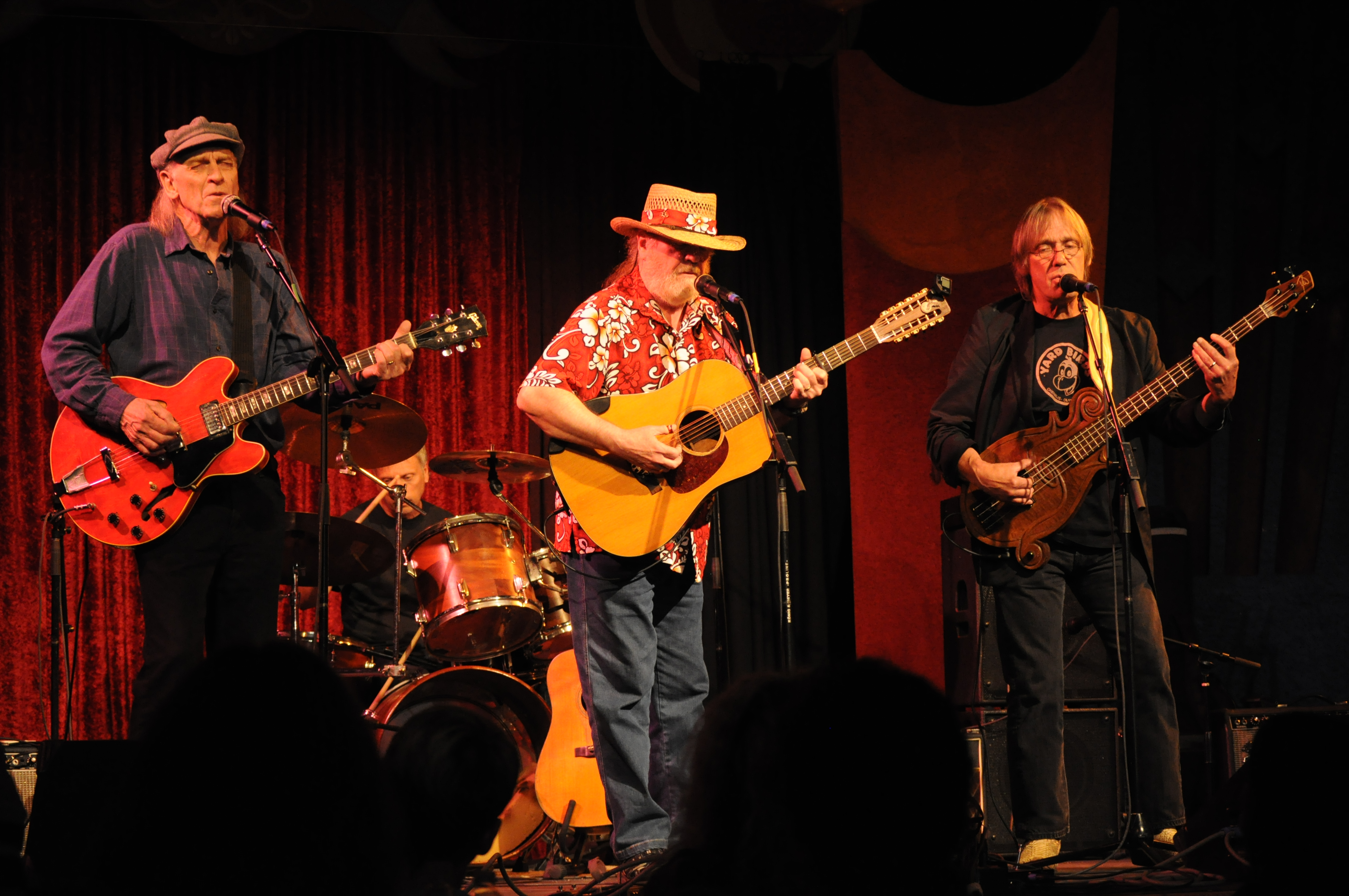
The revived Daily Flash, 2011. Left to right: Barry Curtis (an original member of The Kingsmen), Steve Lalor, Don Wilhelm; behind, Steve Peterson (Kingsmen drummer since 1988).

The Daily Flash are an American folk rock and psychedelic band founded in 1965, active until 1968 and reformed in 2002. originally based in Seattle and later in Los Angeles. The group was composed of guitarist/singer Steve Lalor, lead guitarist Doug Hastings, bass player/singer Don MacAllister and drummer Jon Keliehor. According to Mike Stax, they "had become a major force in the growing Seattle underground scene by 1965." Their sound, which incorporated elements of folk music and jazz as well as rock stood in contrast to the garage rock sound typical of the Pacific Northwest at the time, anticipating the sound that came to be identified with San Francisco.

== Origin ==
Don MacAllister and Steve Lalor first met in early 1964 on the Seattle folk music scene. MacAllister was in a bluegrass trio called The Willow Creek Ramblers; Lalor had dropped out of college in Ohio in January 1963, spent some time in San Francisco where he had met future core members of Jefferson Airplane and Quicksilver Messenger Service, then traveled north to Seattle, where he made some good connections and ended up appearing regularly for a time on Seattle Center Hootenanny which aired on KING-TV. At this time he was performing with Alice Stuart and Mike Hall as the Upper University District Folk Music Association and Mandolin Society and Glee Club and they recorded a single, "Green Satin", for Jerden Records. MacAllister and Lalor began to play together informally.

Lalor played for a time in the Driftwood Singers, which he formed with Lyn Brooks and Courtney Branch. Courtney dropped out and was replaced by Billy Roberts, writer of "Hey Joe". They became the house band of the hungry i. The band broke up and MacAllister convinced him to move back north and form a group in Seattle with another guitarist, Doug Hastings, still in college at the time and occasionally sitting in with another local outfit, The Dynamics. They planned to recruit drummer Don Stevenson (later of Moby Grape), but instead Stevenson joined the established local band The Frantics and that band's departing drummer Jon Keliehor (who had a background in jazz and classical music) joined MacAllister and Lalor.

== Heyday: the original lineup (1965–1967) ==
From the outset, two things characterized The Daily Flash. Their eclectic blend of folk, blues, pop and jazz set them apart from the "garage band" sound that dominated the Pacific Northwest. Their flair for publicity was such as to get the band press before they even got their first gig. They devised a sound system that suited their tight harmonies, pioneered new venues and aimed beyond a teen audience, and aligned themselves with the emergent hippie counterculture.

Around the end of 1965, local record distributor Ron Saul got the group a deal with Parrot Records, a division of London Records. Their first single was a cover of Bob Dylan's "Queen Jane Approximately". The B-side was originally supposed to be Dino Valenti's "Birdses", but Saul shelved that, releasing the funkier "Jack of Diamonds," recorded at the same Tacoma, Washington studio favored by The Wailers. The latter track would eventually find its way onto the 1998 CD re-issue of Nuggets: Original Artyfacts from the First Psychedelic Era, 1965–1968.

The single, released in spring 1966, was not a commercial success. However, it did get them the attention of Sonny & Cher's then-manager Charlie Greene. On the lookout for additional acts to manage, that year he signed both The Daily Flash and Buffalo Springfield. The band headed to Los Angeles to record a stronger version of "Queen Jane Approximately," but that also met a lukewarm response in the market.

Still, their reputation as a live act was growing. On the way south they headlined a pair of Chet Helms-promoted shows at San Francisco's Avalon Ballroom, supported both nights by the Rising Sons (a band that included future stars Ry Cooder and Taj Mahal); the additional act on Friday night was a pre-Janis Joplin version of Big Brother & The Holding Company and on Saturday The Charlatans (featuring Dan Hicks). At the end of July 1966 they played the Vancouver Trips Festival. According to Keliehor, that was the only time they ever played a gig under the influence of a mind-altering substance (LSD provided by Owsley Stanley).

The band—now based in Los Angeles but probably more popular in San Francisco and viewed as hometown heroes in Seattle—traveled the West Coast, supporting acts such as The Byrds, The Doors and The Turtles in Los Angeles and playing repeatedly in San Francisco at the Avalon Ballroom on bills with such bands as Country Joe & The Fish and the Quicksilver Messenger Service. Their repertoire ranged from Dylan and Eric Andersen to Herbie Hancock, Cannonball Adderley and Gabor Szabo.

Early in 1967 their second single was released: Ian Tyson and Sylvia Fricker's "French Girl" b/w Dave Van Ronk's "Green Rocky Road" on the L.A.-based UNI Records. Greene arranged the band's first East Coast tour to coincide with the release, kicking off with a successful one-month residency at the Club Ondine in Manhattan. They also played a gig with the Jefferson Airplane at Stony Brook University.

The single did well in California (though less so elsewhere), netting the band a guest appearance on the TV show The Girl From U.N.C.L.E., which in turn led to a regular spot as a house band on a local Los Angeles teen-oriented TV show Boss City. They continued to gig, in Los Angeles, San Francisco, and Seattle playing on bills with British supergroup Cream, Quicksilver Messenger Service, Steve Miller Band, The Doors and, in Seattle, The Seeds and Paul Revere & the Raiders.

== Changes and breakup (1967) ==
In an era when it was more and more presumed that bands would have original material, none of The Daily Flash's members were inclined to write songs. Most of their copyrighted originals were really just reworkings of folk material in the public domain. The band began to grow apart, with members increasingly playing in other configurations. Hastings left to replace Neil Young in the Buffalo Springfield (a short-lived gig, as Young soon returned to that band) and was replaced by Craig Tarwater. Shortly after that, drummer Keliehor was booted after he chose a Transcendental Meditation workshop over a gig, and was replaced by Tony Dey.

The reconfigured band added a few original songs, written by Steve Lalor. They played the Avalon Ballroom in July 1967, warming up for The Grass Roots, then warmed up for the Grateful Dead at Seattle's Eagles Auditorium and Vancouver, BC's Agradome/Dante's Inferno, returned to play some shows in Los Angeles, followed by another Pacific Northwest tour in late September and early October, including a show at Eagles Auditorium that was recorded: their version of Herbie Hancock's 'Cantaloupe Island' from that show is on the 1985 I Flash Daily album. After that they supported Van Morrison on a short tour, but in late October this lineup also split, with MacAllister and Tarwater going one way and Lalor and Dey another.

Lalor and Dey briefly formed one further incarnation of The Daily Flash in November 1967, playing six dates in Seattle and Portland, Oregon with a returned Doug Hastings and Tony Dey's brother Rick, but this was understood by all involved to be a stopgap to raise some money before moving on to other projects.

== Aftermath ==
The various members of the Daily Flash went on to a variety of careers.

Hastings played in several bands the next few years, including Rhinoceros, but in June 1970 returned to college and pursued a career in petroleum geology.

MacAllister and Tarwater went on to a band originally called 'Nirvana' and later 'Two Guitars, Piano, Drum and Darryl'; its other members were Jeff Simmons (previously with Frank Zappa's Mothers of Invention), Ron Woods (formerly of the Seattle-area band The Dynamics, later a Buddy Miles sideman), and former Iron Butterfly vocalist Darryl De Loach; they had one single on Atlantic Records and recorded the soundtrack for the film Pit Stop. MacAllister became a session player and a support player in several major touring bands, but died of a drug overdose in late 1969.

Lalor and Keliehor continued as musicians. Both went on to play in Bodine, who had an album on MGM records in 1969. Lalor moved back to Seattle, where he performed a variety of folk and blues music before founding a revived Daily Flash in 2002. Keliehor's career has been much more varied, ranging from an appearance on Jeff Simmons' album Lucille Has Messed My Mind Up to composing music for contemporary dance, ballet, film, television and theater. His career has been mainly in the United Kingdom, though he has returned at times to the United States.

Both Dey brothers recorded a 1972 album on CBS Records with Barry Melton and Jay Levy as Melton, Levy & The Dey Brothers. Tony Dey was a session player in the 1970s and '80s before settling in Sacramento, California and working in a record store. Rick Dey died of an overdose.

== Compilation album and revivals ==
Keliehor and Lalor worked with Bob Jeniker and Peter Blecha to put together a Daily Flash compilation, I Flash Daily, released by UK label Psycho in March 1985. The compilation consisted of the group's two released singles and various unreleased tracks. US-based Sundazed Music released a 45 RPM EP in 1996. The sleeve lists the songs as "Jack of Diamonds", "Girl From North Alberta", "When I Was a Cowboy" and "Grizzly Bear". However, it does not contain "Jack of Diamonds", but another song recorded by The Daily Flash called "Bonny Ship the Diamond".

Hastings, Lalor, and Keliehor played a one-off revival in Seattle in 1985. Lalor was the only original member in the revived version of the band active from 2002 to Lalor's death in 2018. This current configuration of the Daily Flash includes two members of The Kingsmen.

== Members ==
=== Original lineup ===
- Don MacAllister (b. 1942, Seattle, Washington; d. 1969 Los Angeles, California): bass, vocal
- Steve Lalor (b. Sept. 12, 1944, Glens Falls, New York; d. 2018 Seattle, Washington): guitar, vocal
- Jon Keliehor (b. Oct. 18, 1941, Lincoln, Nebraska): drums
- Doug Hastings (b. June 21, 1946, Seattle, Washington): guitar

=== Replacements ===
- Craig Tarwater replaced Doug Hastings on guitar July–October 1967
- Tony Dey replaced Jon Keliehor on drums July–November 1967
- Rick Dey replaced Don MacAllister on bass for the band's last six performances in November 1967

=== Revived lineup ===
Beginning August 2002:

- Steve Lalor: guitar, vocal (of Driftwood Singers)
- Barry Curtis (of The Kingsmen): guitar, vocal
- Don Wilhelm: bass, vocal (of Army, Shyanne, White Heart, Heart)
- Steve Peterson (of The Kingsmen): vocals, percussion, mandolin, whistles
