= The Parade (band) =

- Origin: Los Angeles, California, United States
- Genres: Sunshine pop
- Labels: A&M
- Past members: Jerry Riopelle; Murray MacLeod; Allen Roberds

The Parade was an American sunshine pop group from Los Angeles, California.

== Career ==
The group featured Jerry Riopelle, who played keyboards on several Phil Spector-produced records; Murray MacLeod, an actor who appeared on Hawaii Five-O and Kung Fu; and Allen "Smokey" Roberds, another actor. They wrote a song called "Sunshine Girl" which was picked up by A&M Records, and in 1967 the tune hit #20 on the U.S. Billboard Hot 100 pop singles chart. Among the session musicians on this recording were drummer Hal Blaine, bassist Carol Kaye, and saxophonist Steve Douglas. Stuart Margolin, later to gain fame as an actor, co-wrote the B-side with members of the band; Margolin would end up co-writing many of the band's songs (usually with Riopelle), as well as playing percussion on some tracks.

The Parade's next two singles, "She's Got the Magic" and "Frog Prince", both failed to chart. 1968's "Radio Song" bubbled under the Hot 100 at #127, but the group broke up after two further singles - "She Sleeps Alone" and "Hallelujah Rocket" - were unsuccessful.

Riopelle signed to Capitol Records as a solo artist, and Macleod and Roberds signed with Epic Records as the duo Ian & Murray. Roberds also later performed under the name Freddie Allen, and under this name recorded the very first released version of the tune "We've Only Just Begun," which soon afterward became a hit for The Carpenters.

In March 2008, Now Sounds/Cherry Red Records released a 23-song best-of compilation album, Sunshine Girl: The Complete Recordings. Compiled and annotated by Steve Stanley, the release featured singles, demos and alternate mixes, as well as a rare Roger Nichols Trio song "Montage Mirror," for which Murray MacLeod was also lead singer, along with his sister Melinda.
