= Hallucinations: Psychedelic Pop Nuggets from the WEA Vaults =

Box set by Various Artists
- Released: March 11, 2004
- Genre: Psychedelic pop, sunshine pop, psychedelic rock
- Label: Rhino
- Producer: Andrew Sandoval

Various Artists chronology
Nuggets II: Original Artyfacts from the British Empire and Beyond, 1964–1969 (2001)	Hallucinations: Psychedelic Pop Nuggets from the WEA Vaults (2004)	Come to the Sunshine: Soft Pop Nuggets from the WEA Vaults (2004)

Professional ratings
Review scores
Source	Rating
Allmusic	link

Hallucinations: Psychedelic Pop Nuggets from the WEA Vaults is a 2004 compilation album released by Rhino Handmade, one of two new compilations using the Nuggets name. As with all Rhino Handmade releases, it was only available online, and a limited number of copies were pressed. All 7500 copies are currently sold out.

The title comes from the first track, performed by Baker Knight & the Knightmares. As the title suggests, all 24 tracks were taken from the library of the Warner Music Group. The labels represented in this release are Atco, Colgems, Cotillion, Jubilee, Loma, Reprise, Valiant, and Warner Bros. Records.

The compilation was produced by Andrew Sandoval.

The compilation was sold in the UK under the title, My Mind Goes High: Psychedelic Pop Nuggets from the WEA Vaults. The track listing is the same.

The compilation was reissued on vinyl and limited to 7000 copies for Record Store Day 2016.

== Track listing ==
1. Baker Knight & the Knightmares: "Hallucinations"
2. The Misty Wizards: "It's Love"
3. The Next Exit: "Break Away"
4. The Collectors: "Looking at a Baby"
5. Adrian Pride: "Her Name Is Melody"
6. The Association: "Pandora's Golden Heebie Jeebies"
7. The World Column: "Lantern Gospel"
8. Tom Northcott: "Who Planted Thorns in Alice's Garden"
9. John Wanderling: "Man of Straw"
10. Ellen Marguiles: "The White Pony"
11. Jeff Thomas: "Straight Aero"
12. M.C.²: "My Mind Goes High"
13. Brass Buttons: "Hell Will Take Care of Her"
14. The Salt: "Lucifer"
15. Kim Fowley: "Strangers from the Sky"
16. The Electric Prunes: "Antique Doll"
17. The Bonniwell Music Machine: "Astrologically Incompatible"
18. The Tokens: "How Nice?"
19. The Coronados: "Your Love Belongs to Everyone"
20. Lee Mallory: "That's the Way It's Gonna Be"
21. The Glass Family: "House of Glass"
22. The Holy Mackerel: "Wildflowers"
23. The Monkees: "Porpoise Song"
24. The West Coast Pop Art Experimental Band: "Smell of Incense"
