= Let Me Be the No. 1 (Love of Your Life) =

Song by Dooley Silverspoon
- A-side: "Let Me Be The No.1 (Love Of Your Life) - Part 1"
- B-side: "Let Me Be The No.1 (Love Of Your Life) - Part 2"
- Released: 1975
- Label: Seville SEV 1020
- Composer(s): Sonny Casella
- Producer(s): S.O.N.N.Y.

"Let Me Be the No. 1 (Love of Your Life)" was a 1975 single for Dooley Silverspoon. It charted in the United Kingdom and the Netherlands.

== Background ==
"Let Me Be The No. 1 (Love Of Your Life)" Parts 1 & 2 was issued on Seville SEV 1020 in 1975.

== Reception ==
In the Record Mirror November 15, 1975 issue, James Hamilton said that "Let Me Be The No. 1 (Love Of Your Life)" was the strongest pick from Dooley Silverspoon's "Hustling" album. What alerted James Hamilton to the record was the producer S.O.N.N.Y. who Sonny Casella. He was hoping that the record would break in the UK like it had in the US.

== Charts ==
For the week of October, 18, 1975, the single was on the Record World Discotheque Hit Parade being played at the Iron Rail in Brooklyn New York. On the week of November 29, the single referred to as "Let Me Be the #1" was at no. 12 in the Billboard Disco Action chart, Colony Records (New York) section.

Charting in England, it spent three weeks in the UK national chart, peaking at number 44 in February, 1976. It also registered on the Tipparade chart in the Netherlands. Spending five weeks in the chart, it peaked at no. 4 on the week of February 4.
