= The Del-Vetts =

- Origin: Chicago, Illinois, United States
- Genres: Garage rock, psychedelic rock, protopunk, pop rock, folk rock, surf rock, proto-metal
- Years active: 1965–1968
- Labels: Dunwich, Acta
- Past members: Jim Lauer; Lester Goldboss; Bob Good; Paul Wade; Jeff Gerchenson; Jeff Weinstein; Jack Burchall; Roger Deatherage

The Del-Vetts were an American garage rock band formed in Chicago, Illinois, in 1963. They released five singles and obtained regional success in the Midwest.

== Band ==
The first lineup of the band consisted of Jim Lauer (lead vocals, lead guitar), Bob Good (bass guitar), Lester Goldboss (rhythm guitar) and Paul Wade (drums), Jeff Gerchenson (vocals & rhythm guitar), originally performing cover versions of Chuck Berry songs and surf rock standards, and developing a loyal following in Chicago. The Del-Vetts' initial membership was not the most well-known incarnation of the band, though they did team up with record producer, Bill Traut, in 1965, to record a rendition of The Righteous Brothers' hit, "Little Latin Lupe Lu", on the small Seeburg Records label. Within a year of performing regularly at popular teen dance clubs such as the Cellar and the Rolling Stone, a solidified lineup emerged, and included Lauer, Good, who swapped to rhythm guitar, Jack Burchall (bass guitar) and Roger Deatherage (drums).

Despite the lack of commercial success resulting from their debut, Traut still felt the band could reach a breakthrough. He signed The Del-Vetts to a recording contract with Dunwich Records, and recorded their most commercially successful, and best known song, "Last Time Around", an original composition by colleague Dennis Dahlquist, in early 1966. The song, with a fuzz-toned guitar instrumental performed by Lauer acting as the highlight, was released as the band's second single, and scaled the regional charts to become the most-requested track on Chicago radio stations. However, their later in the year follow-up effort, "I Call My Baby STP", underperformed and could not reach the same success as "Last Time Around".

In 1967, the group changed its name to The Pride and Joy and released the single "Girl", a regional hit, and moved to Acta Records after a corporate restructuring at Dunwich. The group's last single was "We Got a Long Way to Go", written by Barry Mann and Cynthia Weil; when it failed to chart at radio, Burchall left the group, and The Pride and Joy broke up in 1968.

In 1983, Burchall hit the pop charts again with the Jump 'N the Saddle Band's novelty song hit, "The Curly Shuffle". The Del-Vetts, however, fell into obscurity until the release of the Nuggets and Pebbles series in the late 1990s, when several of their tracks were included on the compilation albums. Lead singer Jim Lauer reportedly ended up in a mental institution.

== Members ==
Original lineup, 1963

- Jim Lauer - vocals, guitar
- Lester Goldboss - guitar
- Bob Good - bass (later guitar)
- Paul Wade - drums
- Jeff Gerchenson - vocals, guitar

Later members

- Jeff Weinstein - guitar
- Jack Burchall - bass
- Roger Deatherage - drums

== Discography ==
Singles

- "Little Latin Lupe Lu" b/w "Ram Charger" (1965)
- "Last Time Around" b/w "Everytime" (1966)
- "I Call My Baby STP" b/w "That's the Way It Is (PS)" (1966)
