= Clefs of Lavender Hill =

American folk rock band

Clefs of Lavender Hill were a folk rock band from Miami, Florida, US.

The group formed in 1966 around the nucleus of brother and sister Travis and Coventry Fairchild, the chosen stage names of Joseph and Loraine Ximenes. Adding Fred and Bill Moss, of the group The Twilights (who had released one single, "She's There", in 1965), they released a single entitled "First Tell Me Why" on Thames Records. The B-side of the single, "Stop! Get a Ticket", with a sound highly reminiscent of The Beatles, became a hit on Miami radio stations, and eventually Date Records picked it up for national distribution. The record reached #80 on the Billboard Hot 100 and #66 in Canada. The single "One More Time" followed, peaking at #114. When follow-up records failed to chart, a planned full-length album was shelved, and Date dropped the group. The group disbanded in 1968.

== Members ==
- Joseph Ximenes (Travis Fairchild) - vocals, guitar
- Lorraine Ximenes (Coventry Fairchild) - vocals, guitar
- Bill Moss - bass guitar (1966–67)
- Fred Moss - drums (1966–67)
- Jon Hair - drums (1967)
- Frank Milone - bass guitar (1967–68)
- Steve Zaricki - drums (1968)

== Singles ==
- "First Tell Me Why" b/w "Stop! Get a Ticket" (1966)
- "One More Time" (1966)
- "It Won't Be Long" (1966)
- "Gimme One Good Reason" (1967)
