= The Little Black Egg =

Nightcrawlers song

Song by the Nightcrawlers

from the album The Little Black Egg
- Released: 1965
- Recorded: 1965
- Genre: Garage rock; jangle pop; bubblegum pop
- Length: 2:45
- Label: Lee
- Songwriter: Chuck Conlon

"The Little Black Egg" is a song first performed by Daytona Beach, Florida garage band the Nightcrawlers in 1965. It was a minor hit in both the US and Canada, reaching number 85 on the US Billboard charts in 1967, while doing slightly better in Canada, where it hit number 74. The song has been since covered by multiple artists including Inner City Unit, the Lemonheads, Neighb'rhood Childr'n, Tarnation, the Primitives and the Cars. It was the Nightcrawlers' only hit.

== Original recording ==
The song was written in 1965 for an Easter concert, in which the band opened for the Beach Boys. The song was originally recorded in 1965 by sound engineer Lee Hazen and released on Hazen's record label Lee Records; the 1965 release became a regional hit in the Nightcrawlers' home state of Florida and in the Midwest. The song was re-released on Kapp Records in 1966, finally charting nationally in both the US and Canada early the following year. AllMusic reviewer Matthew Greenwald describes the song as a "slightly bizarre nursery rhyme", with lyrics about a rotten bird's egg.

== Other versions ==
"The Little Black Egg" was included in the influential compilation album Nuggets: Original Artyfacts from the First Psychedelic Era, 1965–1968 on the 1998 CD reissue, as a bonus track.

Ohio punk band the Pagans recorded the song in the late 1970s. In 1981, during recording sessions for Shake It Up, members of the Cars recorded a version featuring Ric Ocasek on lead vocals. The song was later stripped of Ocasek's vocals and re-sung by fashion model Bebe Buell, whom Ocasek had befriended. The version with Buell's vocals was included on her 1981 EP Covers Girl; the Cars' version was released on 1995's Just What I Needed anthology.

Other recordings of "The Little Black Egg" include a 1985 version by garage rock band the Rattlers, on their only full-size album, Rattled!; a 1991 version by the Primitives, released on their Galore album; a 1993 version by the Lemonheads, released on their Into Your Arms CD single; a 1966 version by the Music Explosion featuring lead singer Jamie Lyons, available on their Anthology CD; and a 1997 version by the Paula Frazer-led country band Tarnation, released on their Mirador album. AllMusic reviewer Stephen Thomas Erlewine described the Tarnation version of "The Little Black Egg" as a highlight of Mirador.

The Minus 5 covered it on the 2000 release In Rock. Chuck Prophet - with his wife, Stephanie Finch, singing lead, sometimes covers the song during his live concerts.
