= The Nightcrawlers =

American garage rock band

- The Nightcrawlers' only LP

Background information
- Origin: Daytona Beach, Florida, United States
- Genres: Garage rock, folk rock
- Years active: 1965–1970
- Past members: Tommy Ruger; Pete Thomason; Sylvan Wells; Robbie Rouse; Chuck Conlon

The Nightcrawlers were an American garage rock band formed in Daytona Beach, Florida in 1965.

The group is best known for their hit single, "The Little Black Egg", which was written in 1965 for an Easter concert in which the band opened for The Beach Boys. The single ultimately reached number 85 on the US national charts and number 74 in Canada after its third re-release in 1967. The group released three other singles: "Cry," "A Basket of Flowers," and "I Don't Remember." The five original members were Tommy Ruger (drums); Rob Rouse (vocal, tambourine); Charlie Conlon (bass, vocal); Sylvan Wells (lead guitar and harmonica); and Pete Thomason (rhythm guitar, vocal).

Their sound is described as sparse folk rock, popularized by The Byrds, The Beau Brummels, and other post-British Invasion mid-1960s bands. They released one album on Kapp Records, but the original lineup disbanded in 1966, before the final (and most popular) release of "The Little Black Egg." The reformed Nightcrawlers did one more single for Kapp, "My Butterfly" written by band members Sylvan Wells and Rick Hollinger, in a more hard rock vein and then disbanded. The original main songwriter, Charlie Conlon, later reformed the group under the name "Conlon and the Crawlers", although the group did not record after 1967. The group continued with different members including Marshall Letter and eventually disbanded in 1970. In 2000, a retrospective CD with 24 cuts by the original members was released by Big Beat/London, England.

Although the group never gained wide fame, the simple riff of "The Little Black Egg" made it a favorite cover for garage bands of each musical era since the 1960s. It was covered in the 1990s by The Lemonheads. The Cars also covered "The Little Black Egg." On September 19, 2008, the world premier of the film Cracking The Egg: The Untold Story of The Nightcrawlers was held at the 6th annual Daytona Beach Film Festival. Outsider music specialist Irwin Chusid claimed that when he was a teen the record sparked his interest in "odd songs".

At the behest of Ajaye Agency in Cincinnati, Rick Hollinger reformed the Nightcrawlers in 1968 in Tallahassee, Florida, for the express purpose of taking them to Ohio because the song "Little Black Egg" was enjoying a resurgence. Besides Rick, the group members were Gary Sockwell on drums, Eddie Everette on lead guitar and vocals, Rod Vaillancourt on keyboards and vocals and Steve Flacy on bass guitar. They worked for years in a multi-state area but never issued additional recordings. Rod Vaillancourt and Steve Flacy went on to work with Adrian Belew in a band called Sweetheart and Rod later recorded with Artimus Pyle.

Original drummer Tommy Ruger (born Thomas William Ruger on November 30, 1946) died from complications of diabetes in Port Orange, Florida on December 11, 2013. He was 67.

Original bassist/vocalist Charlie "Chuck" Conlon (born Charles Richard Conlon on February 23, 1947) died from complications from a stomach ulcer in Kirkland, Washington on August 22, 2023. He was 76.
