= The Third Rail (band) =

American pop/rock music group (1967–1968)

The Third Rail was an American pop/rock group, briefly popular in the 1960s, made up of studio musicians.

The group had three members: Arthur Resnick, Kris Resnick (Arthur's wife), and Joey Levine. Arthur had spent years writing Brill Building pop songs, including "Under the Boardwalk" by The Drifters and "Good Lovin'" by The Rascals. Levine had played in local bands in New York City and was still in his teens when the group first recorded together. They did only one live show together, in Cincinnati, though they recorded several singles and an album. In 1967, their single "Run Run Run" reached No. 53 on the Billboard Hot 100, and that same year the LP Id Music was released on Epic Records.

The last single released under the name Third Rail was issued in 1968, after which Levine went on to sing the tune "Yummy Yummy Yummy" for the Ohio Express. All three members later went on to work as songwriters for Kasenetz & Katz.

== Discography ==
=== Albums ===
- Id Music (1967)

=== Charted singles ===
- "Run, Run, Run" (1967) (US #53)
- "It's Time to Say Goodbye" (1968) (US/US Bub. #113)
