= The Beau Brummels discography =

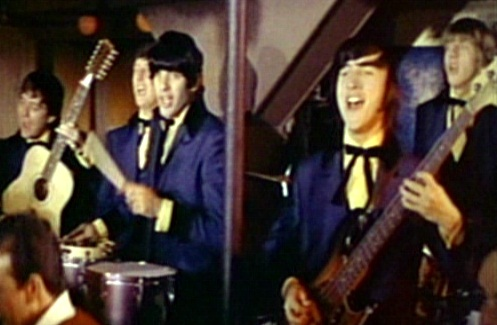
- The Beau Brummels in Village of the Giants (1965). From left: Ron Elliott, Declan Mulligan, Sal Valentino, Ron Meagher, John Petersen.
- Studio albums: 6
- Live albums: 1
- Compilation albums: 14
- Singles: 13

The Beau Brummels were an American rock band that formed in 1964 and originally consisted of singer Sal Valentino, lead guitarist Ron Elliott, bassist Ron Meagher, rhythm guitarist Declan Mulligan and drummer John Petersen. Local radio disc jockeys Tom Donahue and Bobby Mitchell discovered the band at a club near San Francisco. They signed the Beau Brummels to their fledgling Autumn Records label, and their house producer, Sylvester Stewart, later known as Sly Stone, recorded the band's early sessions.

The group's first single, "Laugh, Laugh", was released in December 1964 and peaked at number 15 on the United States Billboard Hot 100 chart in February 1965. It was their highest-charting single in Canada, where it reached number two. The band's debut album, Introducing the Beau Brummels, followed in April and peaked at number 24 on the U.S. Billboard 200 chart. The album featured "Laugh, Laugh" and the band's second single, "Just a Little", which reached the top ten in the U.S., Canada, and Australia. In August, the band released their second album, The Beau Brummels, Volume 2, which failed to chart. "You Tell Me Why" was their third consecutive top-ten single in Canada, and it reached the U.S. top 40.

The Autumn label was sold in early 1966 to Warner Bros. Records, which then persuaded the band to record a covers album titled Beau Brummels '66. Released in July, the album was considered a disappointment by critics and failed to chart. The band worked with producer Lenny Waronker for their next album, the critically acclaimed Triangle (1967), which was followed in 1968 by Bradley's Barn, one of the earliest country rock albums. By 1969 the Beau Brummels had been reduced to a duo consisting of Valentino and Elliott, and they decided to part ways to pursue solo projects and participate on recordings with other artists.

The five original Beau Brummels reformed in 1974 and resumed touring. A performance recorded in February near Sacramento, California, was released in 2000 as the Live! album. In April 1975 the band released an eponymous album, which reached number 180 on the Billboard 200 chart. The group split up soon after the album's release, but the Beau Brummels continued to perform live in various incarnations from the late 1970s to the early 2000s. Fourteen compilation albums featuring the band's music have been released, including two box sets: San Fran Sessions (1996), which contains 60 demos, outtakes, rarities and unissued performances recorded from 1964 to 1966; and Magic Hollow (2005), which collects 113 singles, album tracks, demos and previously unreleased material.

== Albums ==
=== Studio albums ===
Year	Album details	Peak chart positions
Year	Album details	U.S.
1965	Introducing the Beau Brummels: Released: April 1965; Label: Autumn (#103); Format: LP	24
1965	The Beau Brummels, Volume 2: Released: August 1965; Label: Autumn (#104); Format: LP	—
1966	Beau Brummels '66: Released: July 1966; Label: Warner Bros. (#1644); Format: LP	—
1967	Triangle: Released: July 1967; Label: Warner Bros. (#1692); Format: LP	197
1968	Bradley's Barn: Released: October 1968; Label: Warner Bros. (#1760); Format: LP	—
1975	The Beau Brummels: Released: April 1975; Label: Warner Bros. (#2842); Format: LP, 8-Track, Cassette	180
2013	Continuum: Released: March 2013; Label: Bay Sound Records (#8165); Format: CD	—
"—" denotes releases that did not chart.

=== Live album ===
Year	Album	Notes
2000	Live!: Released: August 29, 2000; Label: Dig (#102); Format: CD	Recorded in 1974 at the Shire Road Pub in Fair Oaks, California

=== Compilation albums ===
Year	Album details
1967	The Best of the Beau Brummels: Label: Vault (#114); Format: LP
1968	The Beau Brummels, Volume 44: Label: Vault (#121); Format: LP
1976	Original Hits of the Beau Brummels: Label: JAS (#5000); Format: LP, Cassette
1982	From the Vaults: Label: Rhino (#104); Format: LP
1985	Autumn in San Francisco: Label: Edsel (#141); Format: LP
1987	The Best of The Beau Brummels 1964–1968: Label: Rhino (#70171); Format: LP, CD, Cassette
1994	Autumn of Their Years: Label: Big Beat (#127); Format: CD
1996	San Fran Sessions: Label: Sundazed (#11033); Format: CD box set
2000	Greatest Hits: Label: Classic World (#9931); Format: CD
2000	Cry Just a Little: Label: Aim (#1068) (AUS); Format: CD
2001	North Beach Legends: Label: Sundazed (#5088); Format: LP
2001	Gentle Wanderin' Ways: Label: Sundazed (#5089); Format: LP
2004	Good Time Music: Label: WMO (#90383); Format: CD
2005	Magic Hollow: Label: Rhino (#77892); Format: CD box set
2021	Turn Around: The Complete Recordings 1964-1970: Label: Now Sounds (#QCRNOWBX58); Format: CD box set

== Singles ==
Year	Titles (A-side, B-side) Both sides from same album except where indicated	Label and number	Peak chart positions				Album
Year	Titles (A-side, B-side) Both sides from same album except where indicated	Label and number	US	US Cash	CAN	AUS	Album
1964	"Laugh, Laugh" b/w "Still In Love With You Baby"	Autumn 8	15	17	2	78	Introducing the Beau Brummels
1965	"Just a Little" b/w "They'll Make You Cry"	Autumn 10	8	7	4	24	Introducing the Beau Brummels
1965	"You Tell Me Why" b/w "I Want You"	Autumn 16	38	36	8	—	The Beau Brummels, Volume 2
1965	"Don't Talk to Strangers" b/w "In Good Time"	Autumn 20	52	53	16	96	The Beau Brummels, Volume 2
1965	"Good Time Music" b/w "Sad Little Girl" (from Volume 2)	Autumn 24	97	93	13	—	Non-album tracks
1966	"One Too Many Mornings" b/w "She Reigns"	Warner Bros. 5813	95	98	—	62	Non-album tracks
1966	"Here We Are Again" b/w "Fine with Me"	Warner Bros. 5848	—	—	—	—	Non-album tracks
1967	"Don't Make Promises" b/w "Two Days 'Til Tomorrow"	Warner Bros. 7014	—	—	—	—	Non-album tracks
1967	"Magic Hollow" b/w "Lower Level" (Non-album track)	Warner Bros. 7079	—	—	—	—	Triangle
1968	"Lift Me" b/w "Are You Happy" (from Triangle)	Warner Bros. 7204	—	—	—	—	Non-album track
1968	"Long Walking Down to Misery" b/w "I'm a Sleeper"	Warner Bros. 7218	—	—	—	—	Bradley's Barn
1969	"Cherokee Girl" b/w "Deep Water"	Warner Bros. 7260	—	—	—	—	Bradley's Barn
1975	"Down to the Bottom" b/w "You Tell Me Why" (new version of 1965 hit)	Warner Bros. 8119	—	—	—	—	The Beau Brummels
"—" denotes releases that did not chart or were not released in that country

== Other appearances ==
Year	Song	Title	Notes
1965	"Just Wait and See"	Wild Wild Winter soundtrack: Format: LP; Label: Decca (#4699)	Originally appeared on Introducing The Beau Brummels.
1992	"Laugh, Laugh"	Shindig!: 60's Superstars: Format: VHS	Performed on a 1965 episode of Shindig!
1996	"Don't Talk to Strangers"	Hullabaloo Volume 7: Format: VHS	Performed on a 1965 episode of Hullabaloo.
2014	"It's Gotta Be"	These Are the Good Times: The Complete Capitol Recordings: Format: CD; Label: Now Sounds (CRNOW-47)	Previously unreleased song recorded in 1965. Appears on this 2014 compilation of Donna Loren's Capitol recordings. Song written by Ron Elliott, performed by Loren, featuring The Beau Brummels.
