= Magic Hollow (album) =

Box set by The Beau Brummels
- Released: June 21, 2005
- Recorded: 1964–1968
- Genres: Folk rock, pop, rock, country rock
- Language: English
- Label: Rhino
- Producers: Al Hazan, Bob Mitchell, Lenny Waronker, Ron Elliott, Sal Valentino, Sylvester "Sly Stone" Stewart, Tom Donahue

Magic Hollow is a box set compilation by The Beau Brummels comprising 113 songs recorded between 1964-1968, including hit singles, demos, outtakes, rarities and previously unissued material. The set was released on June 21, 2005 by Rhino Handmade.

== Music ==
The four-disc collection contains 113 Beau Brummels recordings, including their major and minor hits—"Laugh, Laugh", "Just a Little", "You Tell Me Why", "One Too Many Mornings"— as well as 42 previously unissued tracks. The set is chronologically sequenced, from 1964 demos at the beginning of the first disc, to 1968 songs at the end of the fourth disc. About half of each of the band's studio albums are included, with some songs from Triangle not present and most of Bradley's Barn missing. No material is included from the band's post-1960s reunions.

Previously unreleased songs include "People Are Cruel", a 1964 track written by Ron Elliott prior to the group's signing to Autumn Records. Disc three features several songs composed by Sal Valentino, including solo Valentino demos such as "Only Dreaming Now" and a version of "Magic Hollow". Disc four contains outtakes, demos, and alternate versions of songs released from 1967 to 1968.

The set is supplemented by a 48-page booklet containing photos, song information, and interview quotes with bandmembers.

== Critical response ==
Professional ratings
Review scores
Source	Rating
Allmusic	4.5/5 stars

Richie Unterberger of Allmusic called Magic Hollow "an excellent overview of the career of one of the finest and most underrated American bands". He complimented the balance between familiar songs and unreleased material, noting that the latter "are both plentiful and usually of surprisingly high quality". Paul E. Comeau of No Depression magazine remarked that the set "substantiates the notion that music historians should have been paying more attention to the Beau Brummels’ legacy". Comeau praised "Valentino’s rich and distinctive voice, Elliott’s songwriting and musical talent, and the other three members’ strong rhythm and multi-part harmonies". Ken Tucker of National Public Radio's Fresh Air program recommended the collection "for the idiosyncratic take on harmony and British Invasion pop that these bright West Coast lads were able to produce early in their career".

== Track listing ==
=== Disc one ===
1. "People are Cruel" [demo] — 2:02
2. "Still in Love with You Baby" [demo] — 2:38
3. "Stick Like Glue" [demo] — 2:10
4. "Laugh, Laugh" [alternate version] — 3:25
5. "Just a Little" [alternate version] — 2:39
6. "They'll Make You Cry" — 3:08
7. "Ain't That Loving You Baby" [alternate vocal] — 2:25
8. "That's If You Want Me To" — 2:37
9. "Laugh, Laugh" — 3:12
10. "Still in Love with You Baby" — 2:34
11. "Just a Little" [alternate backing track] — 2:55
12. "I Want More Loving" [alternate mix] — 2:23
13. "Just Wait and See" — 2:22
14. "Stick Like Glue" — 2:01
15. "Just a Little" — 2:26
16. "Here I Am in Love Again" [backing track] — 2:02
17. "I Will Go" [demo] — 2:39
18. "That's Alright" [demo] — 2:22
19. "No Lonelier Man" [demo] — 2:01
20. "She's My Girl" [demo] — 2:28
21. "Love Is Just a Game" [demo] — 2:34
22. "She Loves Me" [demo] — 3:11
23. "Can't Be So" [demo] — 2:18
24. "I'm Alone Again" [demo] — 1:30
25. "Tomorrow Is Another Day" [demo] — 2:47
26. "Woman" [vocal version] — 2:43
27. "When It Comes to Your Love" [version 1] — 2:02
28. "She Loves Me" [backing track] — 4:34

=== Disc two ===
1. "You Tell Me Why" — 3:06
2. "I Want You" — 2:59
3. "Dream On" [demo] — 2:12
4. "Can It Be" — 2:29
5. "I'll Tell You" — 2:45
6. "Doesn't Matter" — 2:01
7. "Gentle Wandering Ways" — 2:42
8. "In Good Time" — 1:49
9. "That's Alright" — 2:13
10. "I Grow Old" — 2:06
11. "Sometime At Night" [Sal's vocal version] — 1:52
12. "Fine with Me" [version 1] — 2:15
13. "Don't Talk to Strangers" — 2:23
14. "I've Never Known" — 2:04
15. "When It Comes to Your Love" — 2:13
16. "Sad Little Girl" [backing track] — 3:32
17. "Before Darkness Ends" — 2:31
18. "Till the Day" — 1:55
19. "Friend of Mine" — 2:24
20. "Darkness" [demo] — 2:05
21. "Good Time Music" — 3:05
22. "She Sends Me" — 2:01
23. "Down on Me" — 2:31
24. "Let Me In" [version 1] — 2:17
25. "Cry Some" — 2:39
26. "Hey Love" — 2:57
27. "Go Away" — 3:26
28. "This Is Love" — 2:16
29. "Find a Place" — 2:10
30. "I Will Go" [backing track] — 4:11

=== Disc three ===
1. "One Too Many Mornings" — 2:54
2. "She Reigns" — 2:58
3. "Hang On Sloopy" — 2:51
4. "Mr. Tambourine Man" — 3:47
5. "Bang Bang" — 1:54
6. "Homeward Bound" — 2:39
7. "You've Got to Hide Your Love Away" — 3:43
8. "On the Road Again" [demo] — 2:29
9. "Out of Control" [demo] — 3:06
10. "God Help the Teenagers Tonight" [demo] — 2:15
11. "Delilah" [demo] — 2:20
12. "Stand Up" — 2:25
13. "Let Me In" [version 2] — 2:22
14. "Here We Are Again" — 2:51
15. "Fine with Me" — 2:28
16. "Galadriel" [demo] — 2:21
17. "You and I" [demo] — 2:33
18. "It Ain't No Use" — 2:46
19. "She's Coming" [demo] — 2:26
20. "Don't Make Promises" — 2:30
21. "Galadriel" — 2:10
22. "Two Days 'Til Tomorrow" — 3:50
23. "Walking in the Park" [demo] — 2:45
24. "Only Dreaming Now" [demo] — 2:13
25. "Magic Hollow" [demo] — 2:17
26. "Where Are You" [demo] — 3:03
27. "Glass" [backing track] — 3:01

=== Disc four ===
1. "Are You Happy?" — 2:17
2. "Only Dreaming Now" — 2:09
3. "The Painter of Women" — 2:50
4. "It Won't Get Better" — 2:02
5. "Magic Hollow" — 2:54
6. "Triangle" — 2:20
7. "Lower Level" — 3:23
8. "Lift Me" — 2:33
9. "High There" — 2:42
10. "I Love You Mama" [version 1] — 3:37
11. "Just a Little Bit of Lovin'" — 3:07
12. "The Dreamer" [demo] — 2:56
13. "Jessica" [demo] — 2:10
14. "I Love You Mama" [version 2] — 2:46
15. "Bittersweet" — 2:37
16. "Jessica" [alternate version] — 2:18
17. "I'll Be Your Baby Tonight" — 3:00
18. "Long Walking Down to Misery" — 2:50
19. "Cherokee Girl" — 3:02
20. "I'm a Sleeper" — 3:13
21. "Another" [demo] — 3:03
22. "Black Crow" [demo] — 2:44
23. "Deep Water" — 2:33
24. "Love Can Fall a Long Way Down" — 4:14
25. "Tan Oak Tree" — 2:24
26. "Turn Around" — 3:05
27. "Another" — 2:49
28. "Deep Water" [alternate version] — 3:19
