= Live! (The Beau Brummels album) =

Live album by The Beau Brummels
- Released: August 29, 2000
- Recorded: February 13–16, 1974
- Genre: Folk rock, country rock, pop rock
- Label: Dig

Live! is a live album by American rock group The Beau Brummels. The album, released in August 2000 by Dig Music, was recorded in February 1974 near Sacramento, California, shortly after it was announced that the band had reunited. The album includes a mix of performances of their most commercially singles, including "Laugh, Laugh" and "Just a Little," as well as then-new material, some of which would be recorded for the band's 1975 eponymous studio album.

== Background ==
In February 1974, Billboard magazine reported that the Beau Brummels re-formed in San Francisco. This followed a five-year hiatus in which individual band members—vocalist Sal Valentino, guitarist Ron Elliott, rhythm guitarist Ron Meagher, bassist Declan Mulligan and drummer John Petersen—pursued solo projects, participated in recording with other artists, or both in some cases. Within days of the announcement, the band performed at the Shire Road Pub in Fair Oaks Village near Sacramento, California. The tapes from these shows represent the only existing concert recordings in the band's discography.

== Music ==
Live! includes performances of the band's four highest-charting U.S. singles: "Laugh, Laugh," "Just a Little," "You Tell Me Why," and "Don't Talk to Strangers." The album also includes renditions of "Nine Pound Hammer," a Merle Travis original which the band performed on their 1967 Triangle album, and "Turn Around," a track from the band's 1968 Bradley's Barn album. The remaining 13 songs were new compositions at the time of recording, 11 of which were written or co-written by Ron Elliott. In addition, Ron Meagher ("Lonely People") and Declan Mulligan ("Lisa") each contributed one song. A handful of the new tracks were re-worked for and appeared on the band's 1975 eponymous studio album, as was the band's 1965 single "You Tell Me Why."

== Release and reception ==
Professional ratings
Review scores
Source	Rating
Allmusic	2.5/5 stars

Released August 29, 2000, Live! was the debut release by Dig Music, a music label based in Sacramento. The label's owners—Marty DeAnda, Jeff Hughson, and Dennis Newhall—licensed the material from the band, and ensured the performances were not recorded during the time when the Beau Brummels were under contract to Warner Bros. Records. Hughson noted that as a result of the album, the band "reunited to perform at San Francisco’s BayPop 2000, then went on to play more dates in New York for us." He added, "Plus Ron Elliott started writing again. He had not written songs in 18 years, and as a result of listening to these tapes and getting enthused again, we got him back into it."

In his review of the album, Rolling Stone writer Charles Bermant said, "the best material here is the spirited and melodic 'new' songs, driven by Sal Valentino's pure voice and (former bassist) Declan Mulligan's spry lead guitar." Bermant also noted Elliott's incorporation of bossa nova and reggae into the band's style. Allmusic writer Bruce Eder said that while Live! is a "decent" album, "it isn't remotely the revelation that one would expect or wish for -- the producers might at least have been more honest by foregoing the exclamation point."

== Track listing ==
1. "Nine Pound Hammer" (Travis) — 3:52
2. "You Tell Me Why" (Elliott) — 3:34
3. "Turn Around/Singing Cowboy" (Elliott, Durand) — 8:01
4. "Gate of Hearts" (Elliott) — 3:18
5. "Lonely People" (Meagher) — 4:19
6. "Music Speaks Louder" (Elliott) — 2:49
7. "Lisa" (Mulligan) — 3:01
8. "Tennessee Walker" (Elliott) — 4:34
9. "Don't Talk to Strangers" (Elliott, Durand) — 2:21
10. "Laugh, Laugh" (Elliott) — 3:15
11. "Lonesome Town" (Elliott) — 3:09
12. "Free" (Elliott, Engle) — 3:45
13. "Man and Woman Kind" (Elliott, Engle) — 4:50
14. "Restless Soul" (Elliott) — 3:29
15. "Her Dream Alley" (Elliott) — 2:34
16. "City Girl" (Elliott, Engle) — 3:29
17. "Paper Plane" (Elliott) — 2:59
18. "Just a Little" (Elliott, Durand) — 2:51
19. "Love Can Fall" (Elliott, Engle) — 4:47
