= Autumn of Their Years =

Compilation album by The Beau Brummels
- Released: 1994
- Recorded: 1964–1966
- Genre: Folk rock, pop, rock
- Length: 63:25
- Language: English
- Label: Big Beat/Ace
- Producer: Sylvester "Sly Stone" Stewart

Autumn of Their Years is a compilation album by American rock band The Beau Brummels. It was released in 1994 by Big Beat Records, and re-released in 2003 by Ace Records. The album consists of 26 songs recorded by the band during their stint at Autumn Records, including previously unreleased demos and outtakes.

== Music ==
Autumn of Their Years features 26 songs recorded by the Beau Brummels from 1964 to 1966. The compilation contains unreleased songs and alternate takes from the band's Autumn Records period. Ten songs—including "She Sends Me", "Dream On", and "Love is Just a Game"—previously appeared on the 1982 Rhino collection From the Vaults, while the remainder of the album consists of sixteen unreleased tracks, including demo versions of the band's early singles "Laugh, Laugh", "Just a Little", and "Still in Love with You Baby".

== Critical reception ==
Professional ratings
Review scores
Source	Rating
Allmusic	3/5 stars

Richie Unterberger of Allmusic wrote that the album has "a lot of fine moments, but actually a bit much for all but hardcore fans", and that "the best cuts ... were already available on From the Vaults". Regarding the previously unreleased demos, Unterberger said they "aren't as good, production-wise ... or material-wise", and called "Tomorrow Is Another Day" the highlight of the album, "showcasing Sal Valentino's rich and moving vocals".

== Track listing ==
No.	Title	Writer(s)	Length
1.	"She Sends Me"	Elliott	2:04
2.	"Tomorrow Is Another Day"	Elliott	2:45
3.	"She Loves Me"	Mulligan	3:08
4.	"Woman"	Durand, Elliott	2:41
5.	"Dream On"	Durand, Elliott	2:23
6.	"Cry Some"	Elliott	2:36
7.	"I Grow Old"	Durand, Elliott	1:57
8.	"No Lonelier Man"	Elliott	1:43
9.	"This Is Love"	Elliott	2:12
10.	"She's My Girl"	Mulligan	2:27
11.	"I'll Tell You"	Elliott	2:45
12.	"Let Me In"	Elliott	2:18
13.	"Love Is Just a Game"	Elliott	2:32
14.	"Till the Day"	Elliott	1:56
15.	"I Will Go"	Elliott	2:38
16.	"Stay With Me Awhile"	Valentino	3:25
17.	"I'm Alone Again"	Elliott	1:28
18.	"Down on Me"	Elliott	2:31
19.	"Can't Be So"	Elliott	2:16
20.	"Fine with Me"	Durand, Elliott	2:27
21.	"Coming Home"	Elliott	2:11
22.	"That's All That Matters"	Elliott	2:39
23.	"Laugh, Laugh"	Elliott	3:22
24.	"Still in Love with You Baby"	Elliott	2:27
25.	"Just a Little"	Durand, Elliott	2:29
26.	"When It Comes to Your Love"	Elliott	2:05
