= From the Vaults (The Beau Brummels album) =

Compilation album by The Beau Brummels
- Released: 1982
- Recorded: 1964–1966
- Genre: Folk rock, pop, rock
- Length: 37:26
- Label: Rhino (LP), One Way (CD)
- Producer: Sylvester "Sly Stone" Stewart, Bob Mitchell

Professional ratings
Review scores
Source	Rating
Allmusic (1982 LP)	4.5/5 stars
Allmusic (1999 CD)	4/5 stars

From the Vaults is a compilation album by American rock band The Beau Brummels. It was released in 1982 by Rhino Records, and reissued in 1999 by One Way Records. The album contains 14 songs, including rare or previously unreleased material recorded by the band between 1964 and 1966.

== Music ==
From the Vaults, a collection of rarities, demos and previously unreleased material, was assembled and issued by Rhino Records in 1982. The tracks were recorded by the Beau Brummels from 1964 to 1966, when the band was signed to Autumn Records. Songs on the album include "Gentle Wandering Ways", a song that had been rejected as a single, an extended version of "Sad Little Girl", the B-side of the 1965 single "Good Time Music", and the Declan Mulligan-sung version of "Woman", a song previously only available in the 1965 film Village of the Giants. More than half of the album's 14 songs later appeared on the 1994 Autumn of Their Years compilation album.

== Critical response ==
Allmusic's Richie Unterberger said that the Ron Elliott compositions are "easily up to the standard of the ones that made it onto their first two LPs", and described From the Vaults as "achingly tuneful folk rock", while noting "a few cuts ... hint at the country rock direction (the band) would take in the late 60s". Bruce Eder, also of Allmusic, remarked that the material on the album "rival(s) the best contemporary work of The Byrds and nudg(es) up alongside the likes of The Beatles, The Rolling Stones, and The Kinks for listening time". Eder added that the album is "essential listening for anyone interested" in folk rock, garage rock, or music of the 1960s.

== Track listing ==
No.	Title	Writer(s)	Length
1.	"I Will Go"	Elliott	2:41
2.	"Gentle Wandering Ways"	Elliott	2:44
3.	"She Loves Me"	Mulligan	3:24
4.	"I Grow Old"	Elliott	1:35
5.	"Lonely Man"	Elliott	2:03
6.	"I'll Tell You"	Elliott	2:47
7.	"Sad Little Girl"	Elliott	4:22
8.	"Woman"	Durand, Elliott	2:43
9.	"Dream On"	Durand, Elliott	2:29
10.	"Good Time Music"	John Sebastian	3:06
11.	"She Sends Me"	Elliott	2:03
12.	"Love Is Just a Game"	Elliott	2:34
13.	"Can't Be So"	Elliott	2:22
14.	"The Jerk"	Sylvester "Sly Stone" Stewart	4:01
