= San Fran Sessions =

Box set by The Beau Brummels
- Released: June 11, 1996
- Recorded: 1964–1966
- Studio: Golden State Recorders, San Francisco, California, US
- Genre: Folk rock, pop, rock
- Length: 141:52
- Language: English
- Label: Sundazed
- Producer: Sylvester "Sly Stone" Stewart, The Beau Brummels

San Fran Sessions is a box set compilation which collects 60 demos, outtakes, rarities and unissued performances recorded by The Beau Brummels from 1964 to 1966. The three-disc set, released by Sundazed Music on June 11, 1996, includes alternate takes of the band's singles "Laugh, Laugh" and "Just a Little", as well as early versions of songs that were likely targeted for their never-completed third album on Autumn Records.

== Background ==
In addition to demos and alternate takes of some of the Beau Brummels' early material, San Fran Sessions contains songs—such as "I Grow Old", "Gentle Wandering Ways", "Dream On", "Love is Just a Game", "This is Love", and "Hey Love"—that were recorded in 1965 and early 1966 and were likely planned for the band's third album on Autumn Records. Ultimately, the album was never finished because the entire Autumn roster, including the Beau Brummels, was transferred in early 1966 to Warner Bros. Records, who wanted the band to record an album of cover versions of recent hits. The result was Beau Brummels '66, released in July.

== Critical reception ==
Professional ratings
Review scores
Source	Rating
Allmusic	3.5/5 stars

Author and music journalist Richie Unterberger said San Fran Sessions "should only be acquired by serious fans of the band" and added, "from a historical viewpoint, it's interesting in that it presents a lot of previously unheard Sal Valentino-penned tunes (Ron Elliott wrote most of the songs that ended up on official releases)". Unterberger favorably compared the previously unreleased tracks to the rest of the band's Autumn material, praising the band's "beautifully sad harmonies and glittering guitar arrangements". He noted the album also features "substantially different versions of officially released songs like "Laugh, Laugh" and "Just a Little".

== Track listing ==
=== Disc one ===
No.	Title	Writer(s)	Notes	Length
1.	"Still in Love with You Baby"	Ron Elliott	early version	2:30
2.	"It's So Nice"	Sal Valentino	demo	1:45
3.	"Love Is Just a Game"	Elliott	demo	2:33
4.	"Just a Little"	Bob Durand, Elliott	alternate version 1	2:30
5.	"Just Wait and See"	Elliott	early version	2:04
6.	"How Many Times"	Elliott	demo	2:04
7.	"Stay With Me Awhile"	Valentino	demo	3:23
8.	"I Will Go"	Elliott	demo	2:37
9.	"Laugh, Laugh"	Elliott	alternate version	3:21
10.	"Sad Little Girl"	Elliott	demo	4:10
11.	"She's My Girl"	Declan Mulligan	demo	2:24
12.	"Talk to Me"	Mulligan	demo	1:13
13.	"Before Darkness Ends"	Valentino	demo	2:28
14.	"Hey Love"	Valentino	demo	2:28
15.	"That's All That Matters"	Elliott		2:37
16.	"I Want More Loving"	Elliott	alternate vocal	2:22
17.	"I Will Love You Still"	Valentino	demo	1:24
18.	"Just a Little"	Durand, Elliott	alternate version 2	2:20
19.	"News"	Valentino	demo	1:52
20.	"Woman"	Durand, Elliott	demo	1:11

=== Disc two ===
No.	Title	Writer(s)	Notes	Length
1.	"Sometime at Night"	Durand, Elliott	alternate vocal	1:48
2.	"Sad Little Girl"	Elliott	alternate version 1	4:18
3.	"I'll Tell You"	Elliott		2:42
4.	"When It Comes to Your Love"	Elliott	Village of the Giants version	2:10
5.	"Can't Be So"	Elliott	demo	2:15
6.	"That's Alright"	Valentino	demo	2:19
7.	"No Lonelier Man"	Elliott	demo	1:58
8.	"She Loves Me"	Mulligan	demo	3:08
9.	"Can It Be"	Durand, Elliott	demo	2:17
10.	"Forget It Babe"	Valentino	demo	3:22
11.	"Woman"	Durand, Elliott	instrumental	2:45
12.	"No Lonelier Man"	Elliott	demo	1:41
13.	"Tomorrow Is Another Day"	Elliott	demo	2:43
14.	"I'm Alone Again"	Elliott	demo	1:26
15.	"Kill"	Elliott	demo	1:39
16.	"When It Comes to Your Love"	Elliott	demo	1:50
17.	"Sad Little Girl"	Elliott	alternate version 2	3:04
18.	"Sometime at Night"	Durand, Elliott	alternate version	1:50
19.	"On the Road Again"	Valentino	demo	3:13
20.	"Pity the Fool"	Elliott	demo	1:41

=== Disc three ===
No.	Title	Writer(s)	Notes	Length
1.	"She Sends Me"	Elliott		2:02
2.	"Fine With Me"	Durand, Elliott		2:24
3.	"Friend of Mine"	Elliott	demo	2:29
4.	"Gentle Wandering Ways"	Elliott		2:41
5.	"This Is Love"	Valentino	demo	2:12
6.	"This Is Love"	Valentino		2:12
7.	"I Grow Old"	Durand, Elliott	version 1	2:06
8.	"Dream On"	Elliott		2:26
9.	"Till the Day"	Elliott	demo	1:58
10.	"I'll Go Now"	Valentino	demo	3:23
11.	"Down on Me"	Elliott		2:27
12.	"I Cannot Hide"	Elliott	demo	2:22
13.	"Let Me In"	Elliott		2:15
14.	"Cry Some"	Elliott		2:34
15.	"What Do You Want"	Elliott	demo	2:33
16.	"Hey Love"	Valentino		3:01
17.	"I Grow Old"	Durand, Elliott	version 2	2:01
18.	"Find a Place"	Valentino	demo	2:06
19.	"I Will Go"	Elliott	instrumental	2:43
20.	"Coming Home"	Elliott	demo	2:30
