= The Best of The Beau Brummels 1964–1968 =

The Best of the Beau Brummels 1964–1968

Greatest hits album by The Beau Brummels
- Released: 1987
- Recorded: 1964–1968
- Genre: Folk rock, pop, rock, country rock
- Length: 47:51
- Label: Rhino
- Producer: Sylvester "Sly Stone" Stewart, Lenny Waronker

The Best of the Beau Brummels 1964–1968, sometimes titled The Best of the Beau Brummels: Golden Archive Series, is a compilation album by American rock band The Beau Brummels. Released in 1987 by Rhino Records, the album features 18 songs, including the band's biggest hit singles—"Laugh, Laugh", "Just a Little", "You Tell Me Why", and "Don't Talk to Strangers"—as well as songs which never appeared on an album before this collection, such as the 1967 single "Here We Are Again".

== Reception ==
Professional ratings
Review scores
Source	Rating
Allmusic	4.5/5 stars

Allmusic writer Bruce Eder said the album "holds up as either an introduction to, or survey of the band's history," adding "the annotation is very good as well, and is supported by great artwork." Eder added, "Casual listeners will probably love this CD, but after a few listens, they may join the serious fans in wishing that a more expansive survey of the Beau Brummels' work — along the lines of Rhino's double-CD anthologies on The Association and The Turtles [...] could be assembled." Author and journalist Richie Unterberger described the album as "a good 18-song survey of their 1960s tracks," though he questioned the omission of 'I Want You', the B-side to the 1965 single "You Tell Me Why". The album was named by Allmusic one of the "15 Most Essential Recordings" in folk rock.

== Track listing ==
1. "Laugh, Laugh" (Elliott) — 3:03
2. "Still in Love With You Baby" (Elliott) — 2:32
3. "Just a Little" (Elliott, Durand) — 3:04
4. "They'll Make You Cry" (Elliott) — 2:25
5. "You Tell Me Why" (Elliott) — 3:05
6. "Don't Talk to Strangers" (Elliott, Durand) — 2:21
7. "In Good Time" (Elliott) — 1:48
8. "When It Comes to Your Love" (Elliott) — 2:12
9. "Sad Little Girl" (Elliott) — 3:30
10. "Gentle Wandering Ways" (Elliott) — 2:41
11. "One Too Many Mornings" (Dylan) — 2:51
12. "Here We Are Again" (Valentino) — 2:51
13. "Fine With Me" (Elliott) — 2:26
14. "Don't Make Promises" (Hardin) — 2:37
15. "Two Days 'Til Tomorrow" (Elliott, Durand) — 2:32
16. "Magic Hollow" (Elliott, Valentino) — 2:52
17. "Are You Happy" (Elliott, Durand) — 2:18
18. "Deep Water" (Elliott, Valentino) — 2:30
