= Good Time Music =

"Good Time Music" is a song originally recorded by the American folk-rock band the Lovin' Spoonful in 1965. Written by John Sebastian, it appeared on the 1966 Elektra Records compilation What's Shakin'. Author Richie Unterberger characterizes the song as "a sort of manifesto of the group's optimism in its jaunty rhythms and celebration of the return of good time music to the radio."

== The Beau Brummels version ==
"Good Time Music"

Single by the Beau Brummels
- B-side: "Sad Little Girl"
- Released: December 1965
- Recorded: 19 October 1965
- Studio: Golden State Recorders, San Francisco
- Genre: Folk rock
- Length: 2:58
- Label: Autumn
- Songwriter: John Sebastian
- Producer: Bob Mitchell

The Beau Brummels singles chronology
"Don't Talk to Strangers" (1965)	"Good Time Music" (1965)	"One Too Many Mornings" (1966)

Rock group the Beau Brummels recorded a version of "Good Time Music" and released it as a single in 1965. It reached number 97 on the Billboard Hot 100 and number 13 on the Canadian Singles Chart. It was the fifth and final single release by the band on the Autumn Records label. The B-side was "Sad Little Girl", a song written by guitarist Ron Elliott from the band's second album The Beau Brummels, Volume 2. "Sad Little Girl" was called "gorgeous" by music critic Bruce Eder, while author and journalist Richie Unterberger said the song might have been a better choice as the band's third single, following "Laugh, Laugh" and "Just a Little," than actual choice "You Tell Me Why."

== Chart performance ==
Weekly chart performance of the Beau Brummels' version
Chart (1965–66)	Peak position
U.S. Billboard Hot 100	97
U.S. Cash Box Top 100 Singles	93
Canadian Singles Chart	13
