= Here We Are Again =

- French EP

Single by The Beau Brummels
- Released: 1966
- Genre: Folk rock, pop rock
- Length: 2:51
- Label: Warner Bros.
- Songwriter(s): Sal Valentino
- Producer(s): Bob Mitchell

The Beau Brummels singles chronology
"One Too Many Mornings" (1966)	"Here We Are Again" (1966)	"Don't Make Promises" (1967)

"Here We Are Again" is a song by American rock group The Beau Brummels. It was released in 1966 as the band's second single on Warner Bros. Records, following their cover of Bob Dylan's "One Too Many Mornings," released earlier that year. "Here We Are Again" was the first Beau Brummels' A-side written by lead vocalist Sal Valentino.

== Release and reception ==
Upon the release of "Here We Are Again" in the summer of 1966, Billboard predicted that the single would enter the U.S. Hot 100 chart, although it did not, unlike the band's previous six singles. The Beau Brummels, particularly Ron Elliott, had been prolific songwriters up until this time, creating new songs even as their previous label, Autumn Records, collapsed in early 1966. However, following the release of "Here We Are Again" the band did not record any material with Warner Brothers for more than seven months, during which other former Autumn bands The Mojo Men and Harpers Bizarre — previously known as The Tikis — produced hit records for Warner Brothers. "Here We Are Again" was not included on any of the band's studio albums; the song appeared on the 1987 compilation The Best of The Beau Brummels 1964–1968, as well as the 2005 four-disc box set Magic Hollow. A 1987 review of the former compilation in The Absolute Sound called the song "interesting because it so resembles 'The Boy in the Bubble'" - a song from Paul Simon's Graceland (1986) - in that "both share the same rhythm."

== B-side ==
The single's B-side, "Fine With Me," dates back to September 1965, when it was considered for possible release as a single. This version appears on the band's 1996 box set San Fran Sessions, a compilation consisting solely of rarities, demos, alternate takes, and other previously unreleased material. The song, written by Ron Elliott and frequent collaborator Bob Durand, was re-recorded as the flipside to the "Here We Are Again" single. Both versions of the track are included on the Magic Hollow box set.

== Track listing ==
7" Vinyl

No.	Title	Writer(s)	Length
1.	"Here We Are Again"	Valentino	2:51
2.	"Fine With Me"	Elliott, Durand	2:26
