= Introducing The Beau Brummels =

Studio album by the Beau Brummels
- Released: April 1965
- Recorded: October 1964–March 1965
- Studios: Coast Recorders (San Francisco, CA)
- Genres: Garage rock, folk rock, pop rock
- Length: 30:30
- Label: Autumn
- Producer: Sylvester "Sly Stone" Stewart

The Beau Brummels chronology
Introducing The Beau Brummels (1965)	The Beau Brummels, Volume 2 (1965)

Professional ratings
Review scores
Source	Rating
AllMusic	4.5/5 stars
The Encyclopedia of Popular Music	3/5 stars
MusicHound Rock: The Essential Album Guide	3.5/5 stars
Record Mirror	2/5 stars
The Rolling Stone Album Guide	3/5 stars

Introducing The Beau Brummels is the debut album by the American pop rock band the Beau Brummels. It was produced by Sly Stone. Unlike with most other debut albums of the era, ten of the twelve songs on the album are originals. The album peaked at number 24 on the U.S. Top LPs chart in 1965.

== Tracks ==
All songs written by Ron Elliott, except where noted.

Side 1

1. "Laugh, Laugh" - 2:54
2. "Still in Love With You Baby" - 2:32
3. "Just a Little" (Bob Durand, Elliott) - 2:23
4. "Just Wait and See" - 2:22
5. "Oh Lonesome Me" (Don Gibson) - 2:22
6. "Ain't That Loving You Baby" (Deadric Malone) - 2:22

Side 2

7. "Stick Like Glue" - 1:58
8. "They'll Make You Cry" - 3:05
9. "That's If You Want Me To" - 2:23
10. "I Want More Loving" - 2:23
11. "I Would Be Happy" - 2:40
12. "Not Too Long Ago" - 3:06

=== 1998 Repertoire bonus tracks ===
13. "Good Time Music" (John Sebastian) - 3:05 (A-side)
14. "Gentle Wanderin' Ways" - 2:45
15. "Fine With Me" - 2:17 (B-side)
16. "Just a Little" (Durand, Elliott) - 2:23 (Demo)
17. "It's So Nice" - 1:48 (Demo)
18. "How Many Times" - 2:07 (Demo)
19. "She's My Girl" - 2:28 (Demo)
20. "News" - 1:56 (Demo)
21. "I'll Tell You" - 2:45 (Outtake from Volume 2)
22. "No Lonelier Man" - 2:01 (Demo)
23. "She Loves Me" - 3:11 (Demo)
24. "Tomorrow Is Another Day" - 2:44 (Demo)

== Personnel ==
- Sal Valentino - vocals, percussion
- Ron Elliott - lead guitar, backing vocals
- Declan Mulligan - guitar, backing vocals, lead vocal (on "Oh Lonesome Me", and "I Want More Loving"), harmonica
- Ron Meagher - bass, backing vocals, lead vocal (on "They'll Make You Cry" and "Not Too Long Ago")
- John Petersen - drums, lead vocal (on "That's If You Want Me Too")

== Chart performance ==
Chart (1965)	Peak position
U.S. Top LPs (Billboard)	24
