= Don Irving =

American guitarist (born 1946)

- Birth name: Donald Jay Irving
- Born: September 9, 1946 (age 78); Pasadena, California, U.S.
- Genres: Folk rock, pop rock
- Occupation: Guitarist
- Years active: 1965–present

Donald Jay Irving (born September 9, 1946) is an American musician, best known as a guitarist for rock band The Beau Brummels. He was a member of the band for their Beau Brummels '66 album and joined a revamped lineup for a 2002 concert tour.

== History ==
Don Irving, the son of a career military man, spent his early childhood in Germany before returning to California at age nine. His first band was The Showmen, where he played with Butch Engle, later of Butch Engle & the Styx. Irving then joined The Opposite Six, which featured Bill Champlin and two other future members of the Sons of Champlin. In 1965, he played on demos composed by Beau Brummels' lead vocalist, Sal Valentino. Touring had heightened tensions within the Beau Brummels and led to the departure of Declan Mulligan. Later that year, guitarist Ron Elliott was no longer able to perform live after suffering seizures from his diabetic condition. Elliott's father, who managed the Brummels as well as the Styx, was recommended by Engle to recruit Irving as a temporary replacement on the road. Irving became a permanent member in early 1966, and he performed on the band's third album—and first on Warner Bros. Records—Beau Brummels '66. He also played on the band's single, "One Too Many Mornings", a Bob Dylan cover. Drummer John Petersen recalled, "Irving was really cool. He played all of Elliott's licks perfectly. By then we had three albums and we were still a good draw but the vibes in the band weren't healthy. It was really strained. I would go out to Laurel Canyon and people weren't talking to each other. By the time we got sold to Warner Brothers, we weren't the same band anymore". Following the album's release, Petersen quit the band to join Harpers Bizarre, and Irving left when he received an induction notice into the armed forces. In 2002, Irving joined original members Valentino and Ron Meagher for a concert tour.
