= The Vault =

The Vault may refer to:

== Music ==
- The Vault (Ashanti album), a 2009 album by singer Ashanti
- The Vault (Cashis album), a 2011 EP by rapper Cashis
- The Vault (Ol' 55 album), a 1980 album by Australian band Ol' 55
- The Vault: Old Friends 4 Sale, a 1999 album by Prince
- The archive of unreleased Prince projects popularly known as "The Vault"
- The Vault, Vol. 1, a 2007 compilation album by American band Tabitha's Secret
- The Vault, a 2011 mixtape/EP by rapper Cashis
- The Vault, a 2018 EP by G-Eazy
- The Vault (Sirius), a defunct music channel on Sirius Satellite Radio

== Music television ==
- Trace Vault, a British music television channel formerly known as The Vault
- The Vault, a former program on VH1 Classic in the US

== Television ==
- The Vault (game show), a UK game show
- "The Vault", an episode of Mission: Impossible
- "The Vault", an episode of Adventure Time

== Other media ==
- The Vault, a fandom wiki-based open source website for the Fallout video game series
- The Vault, the bonus store in the video game Guitar Hero: Aerosmith
- The Vault, a term used to refer video games included on the EA Access subscription service
- The Vault (novel), a 2011 novel by Ruth Rendell
- The Vault, a history blog of Slate (magazine)
- The Vault (2017 film), a 2017 American film
- The Vault (2021 film), a 2021 Spanish film
- The Vault (Foundation), a portal created by Hari Seldon in the Foundation novel series by Isaac Asimov

== Other uses ==
- The Vault (Coffee Shop), an unmanned self-serve coffee shop in Valley City, North Dakota

== See also ==
- Vault (disambiguation)
- From the Vault (disambiguation)
