= Magic Hollow =

Single by The Beau Brummels

from the album Triangle
- Released: 1967
- Genre: Psychedelic pop, folk rock
- Length: 2:54
- Label: Warner Bros.
- Songwriter(s): Ron Elliott, Sal Valentino
- Producer(s): Lenny Waronker

The Beau Brummels singles chronology
"Don't Make Promises" (1967)	"Magic Hollow" (1967)	"Lift Me" (1968)

Audio sample
- "Magic Hollow": file; help

"Magic Hollow" is a song by American rock group The Beau Brummels, from the band's fourth album, 1967's Triangle. The song, written by guitarist Ron Elliott and lead singer Sal Valentino, was released as the album's first single. The song appeared on the band's 1987 compilation album The Best of the Beau Brummels 1964-1968, and "Magic Hollow" also served as the title of the band's 2005 four-disc box set.

== Release and reception ==
The song, released in 1967, was the first Beau Brummels single credited to both Elliott and Valentino. The song featured session musician Van Dyke Parks on harpsichord. The song also featured an accordion, violin, and a cello. "Magic Hollow" failed to enter the Billboard Hot 100 chart, but since its release the song has been well regarded by music critics. Author and journalist Richie Unterberger described the song as "wispy and wistful," like "mood music for deep forest walks." Stansted Montfichet of Allmusic called it the highlight of the Triangle album, and said the song "remains one of the most beautiful tunes in the entire Brummels canon." In June 1997, music journalist Jon Savage named "Magic Hollow" to Mojo magazine's list of the "100 Greatest Psychedelic Classics." A demo version of the song performed by Valentino appears on the band's four-disc Magic Hollow box set, released in 2005. Author Tom Moon, in his 2008 book 1,000 Recordings to Hear Before You Die: A Listener's Life List, called "Magic Hollow" one of Triangle's key tracks.

The single's non-LP B-side, "Lower Level," was written by Ron Elliott. The song was predicted to reach the Hot 100 in a 1967 issue of Billboard magazine, though it did not enter the chart.

== Track listing ==
7" Vinyl

No.	Title	Writer(s)	Length
1.	"Magic Hollow"	Elliott, Valentino	2:54
2.	"Lower Level"	Elliott	3:23

== Other versions and sampling ==
Raekwon's track "Glaciers of Ice" from the album Only Built 4 Cuban Linx... uses a sample of the harpsichord playing at the beginning of this song.

Norwegian experimental group Ulver recorded a cover version of "Magic Hollow" for their 2012 album Childhood's End. A music video for the song was also released.
