= The Beau Brummels (album) =

Studio album by The Beau Brummels
- Released: April 1975
- Recorded: 1974; Warner Bros. Recording Studios; The Burbank Studios and Sunwest Recording Studio
- Genres: Folk rock, country rock, pop rock
- Length: 32:06
- Label: Warner Bros.
- Producers: Lenny Waronker; Ted Templeman

The Beau Brummels chronology
Bradley's Barn (1968)	The Beau Brummels (1975)

Professional ratings
Review scores
Source	Rating
Allmusic	4.0/5 stars

The Beau Brummels is the sixth studio album by the American rock band of the same name. Released in April 1975, the album features the work of all five original band members for the first time since the band's debut album, 1965's Introducing the Beau Brummels. The album peaked at number 180 on the U.S. Billboard 200 albums chart in 1975.

== Background and release ==
After 1968's Bradley's Barn album, the duo Beau Brummels split. The duo consisted of lead singer Sal Valentino and guitarist-songwriter Ron Elliott. Valentino recorded a few solo singles for Warner Bros. Records before forming a new band, Stoneground, which released three albums between 1971 and 1973. Elliott worked on tracks by The Everly Brothers, Van Dyke Parks, Randy Newman, Little Feat, and Pan. Elliott also released a solo album, The Candlestickmaker, in 1970.

In February 1974, Billboard magazine reported that the Beau Brummels re-formed in San Francisco. A resulting self-titled album containing new material was released in April 1975. One song, "You Tell Me Why" that was a U.S. top 40 hit for the band in 1965, was re-worked for this album. "Down To The Bottom" features guest Ronnie Montrose on lead guitar. The Beau Brummels reached number 180 on the Billboard 200 albums chart. Music critic Matthew Greenwald of Allmusic said the album was "one of the most successful 'reunion' projects of its time." However, in Valentino's view, "We hadn't performed at all, [the album] showed that we hadn't, and we were out of place."

Although this project started out as a full-fledged reunion of the original members, Ron Meagher left the group during production and before the photo shoot for the back of the album cover, hence only four members shown.

== Track listing ==
1. "You Tell Me Why" (Elliott) — 3:15
2. "First in Line" (Elliott, Engle) — 2:59
3. "Wolf" (Elliott) — 2:23
4. "Down to the Bottom" (Elliott, Engle) — 3:24
5. "Tennessee Walker" (Elliott) — 3:14
6. "Singing Cowboy" (Elliott) — 3:17
7. "Goldrush" (Elliott, Engle) — 3:20
8. "The Lonely Side" (Elliott) — 4:34
9. "Gate of Hearts" (Elliott) — 3:00
10. "Today By Day" (Elliott, Engle) — 2:36

== Chart performance ==
Chart (1975)	Peak position
U.S. Billboard 200	180

== Personnel ==
- Sal Valentino - vocals
- Ron Elliott - guitar, vocals
- Ron Meagher - bass, guitar, vocals
- Declan Mulligan - bass, guitar, vocals
- John Petersen - drums
- Dan Levitt - banjo, guitar
- Victor Feldman - percussion
- Mark T. Jordan - piano
- Ronnie Montrose - lead guitar on "Down To The Bottom"
- Nick DeCaro - string arrangements
- Donn Landee - engineer
- Ted Templeman - producer
- Lenny Waronker - producer
