= The Candlestickmaker =

Studio album by Ron Elliott
- Released: 1970
- Genre: Folk rock, country rock
- Length: 32:19
- Label: Warner Bros.
- Producer: Gary Downey, Ron Elliott

The Candlestickmaker is the lone solo album by American musician Ron Elliott, released in 1970 on Warner Bros. It was recorded following the dissolution of The Beau Brummels, with whom Elliott had been the chief songwriter and guitarist. A two-part, fifteen-minute piece titled "The Candlestickmaker Suite" comprises the entire second side of the album.

== Background and composition ==
After the Beau Brummels released Bradley's Barn in 1968, singer Sal Valentino joined another band, Stoneground, leaving Ron Elliott on his own for the first time as a Warner Bros. recording artist. Elliott assembled a team of West Coast musicians including Chris Ethridge (bass), Bud Shank (woodwinds), Leon Russell (brass arrangements), Ry Cooder (guitar), Lyle Ritz (bass), Paul Humphrey (drums) and Dennis Dragon (drums) and recorded The Candlestickmaker, Eliott's lone solo album. Valentino also participated, playing tambourine on some of the tracks.

The first side of the album contains five standalone songs, while the second side is made up entirely of "The Candlestickmaker Suite", a 15-minute piece consisting of two segments. "It's a story about the butcher, the baker, the candlestick maker and I," Elliott said of the two-part suite in a 1999 interview. "All of these forces around this guy going through this madness. It has a healing quality to it."

== Release and reception ==
Professional ratings
Review scores
Source	Rating
Allmusic	4/5 stars

Upon its release in early 1970, The Candlestickmaker received generally positive reviews from music critics. A review in Billboard magazine said, "Elliott's songwriting style makes excellent use of nature's elements and his singing is just right for his songs: natural, masculine and especially casual." The Village Voice called the album "an auspicious debut if we ever heard one."

Elliott recalled, "Years later, I had some guy walk up to me after a gig. He said he was in Vietnam, and he played that album every day, and it saved his life. And that's the kind of album it is. I always thought it should have been in a documentary of Vietnam or something for vets. It was fun doing. But hardly popular."

Contemporary critics have also given the album mostly favorable reviews. Allmusic's Lindsay Planer wrote that "while certainly not every listener's mug of fennel, The Candlestickmaker is a thoroughly enjoyable work and recommended for fans of early-70s West Coast singer-songwriters." Allmusic's Bruce Eder praised the album's "dazzling range, complexity, and beauty – along with Neil Young's self-titled debut solo album and Van Dyke Parks's Song Cycle (on which Elliott played), it was one of the most daring artistic statements to come out of the Warner-Reprise orbit in the 60s." The album went out of print for nearly three decades until Collectors' Choice Music issued it onto CD in 2003.

== Track listing ==
No.	Title	Writer(s)	Length
1.	"Molly in the Middle"	Gary Downey, Ron Elliott	4:09
2.	"Lazy Day"	Downey, Elliott	2:41
3.	"All Time Green"	Elliott	2:51
4.	"To the City, To the Sea"	Elliott	2:59
5.	"Deep River Runs Blue"	Downey, Elliott	2:48
6.	"The Candlestickmaker Suite (Pt. 1: Dark into Dawn/Pt. 2: Questions)"	Elliott	14:51

== Personnel ==
- Ron Elliott – guitar, lyrics, vocals, record producer
- Gary Downey – lyrics, producer
- Marc McClure – guitar, backing vocals
- Dan Levitt – bass, vocal harmonies
- Chris Ethridge – bass
- Dennis Dragon – drums
- Sal Valentino – tambourine
- Bud Shank – flute
- Ry Cooder – guitar
- Lyle Ritz – bass guitar
- Paul Humphrey – drums
- Leon Russell – brass arrangement
- Bob Thompson – string arrangement
- Donn Landee – engineer
