= Triangle (The Beau Brummels album) =

Studio album by the Beau Brummels
- Released: July 1967
- Recorded: June 1967
- Studio: United Recorders (Hollywood) Nashville West (Los Angeles)
- Genre: Folk rock; country rock; psychedelic pop; psychedelic rock
- Length: 28:50
- Label: Warner Bros.
- Producer: Lenny Waronker

The Beau Brummels chronology
Beau Brummels '66 (1966)	Triangle (1967)	Bradley's Barn (1968)

Singles from Triangle
- 1. "Magic Hollow" Released: August 1967

Triangle is the fourth studio album by American rock band the Beau Brummels. Produced by Lenny Waronker and released in July 1967, it was the band's first album to include songs that vocalist Sal Valentino and guitarist Ron Elliott composed together. The band incorporated fantasy elements and surreal characters into the album's song titles and lyrics, and worked with a variety of session musicians to create Triangle's psychedelic musical style. The Beau Brummels were reduced to a trio—Valentino, Elliott, and Ron Meagher—at the time Triangle was recorded, as former group members Don Irving (guitars) and John Petersen (drums) left the band following the release of the group's previous album, Beau Brummels '66.

Triangle reached number 197 on the Billboard 200 albums chart and received mostly positive reviews; critics commended Elliott as a songwriter and compared Valentino's vocals to those of Bob Dylan. The single "Magic Hollow" was ranked one of "The 100 Greatest Psychedelic Classics" in a 1997 issue of Mojo magazine. Warner Japan released this album as WPCP-5252 in 1993. Collectors' Choice Music reissued the album in 2002.

== Background ==
In July 1966, the Beau Brummels released their third album, and first with Warner Bros. Records. Titled Beau Brummels '66, the album was a collection of cover songs and was a commercial disappointment. Critics questioned Warner Brothers' decision to not release the band's original material, which had been recorded by the band in early 1966 as their previous label, Autumn Records, collapsed. These recordings eventually appeared on the 2005 compilation album San Fran Sessions. Following the release of Beau Brummels '66, guitarist Don Irving left the group when he received an induction notice into the armed forces. Drummer John Petersen quit to join pop rock band Harpers Bizarre. By early 1967, the three remaining members—vocalist Sal Valentino, guitarist Ron Elliott, and bassist Ron Meagher—quit touring to focus on studio work. For their next album, Triangle, the band met with Warner Bros. producer Lenny Waronker, who gave the band freedom to resume recording original material. According to Elliott, "Lenny Waronker wanted to do something creative, and I was up for that." During the album's recording sessions, Meagher left the group when he was called to active duty in the Army Reserves.

== Composition ==
Valentino said Triangle was partially inspired by several day trips he took to the California Palace of the Legion of Honor, a fine art museum in San Francisco. He admired the collection of 17th century Flemish portraits and landscape paintings at the museum, from which dark yet incandescent hues emanated. Elliott described the album as a "mythological cartoon about love written from some weird spaces", and explained it as "sort of a mood swing into the world that was around us at the time. It was sort of dissolving into this drug culture. So the music became very ethereal, mystic, and mysterious". In contrast with the band's generally straightforward recordings for the Autumn label, Triangle's lyrics are more abstract, containing Tolkienesque fantasy elements and dream-like characters, such as the gypsy in "Only Dreaming Now", the "Painter of Women", "The Keeper of Time", and "The Wolf of Velvet Fortune", as well as the destination of "Magic Hollow".

Elliott, the band's principal composer, sought to move away from the formulaic songs that Autumn Records wanted. Having regained artistic freedom in the studio, and with the band no longer touring, Elliott and Valentino focused on creating an album of songs which were written and recorded specifically for that purpose. The resulting sessions for Triangle saw Elliott and Valentino collaborate as songwriters for the first time. Four of the album's tracks were written by Elliott with frequent collaborator Bob Durand. The album also contained the Randy Newman composition "Old Kentucky Home" and a cover version of Merle Travis's "Nine Pound Hammer", both of which hinted at the country rock direction explored more heavily by the band on their 1968 album, Bradley's Barn. Session musicians included guitarist James Burton, drummer Jim Gordon, bassist Carol Kaye, and Van Dyke Parks, who played harpsichord on "Magic Hollow", adding to the album's psychedelic musical style. Elliott returned the favor, playing guitar on Parks' 1968 debut album, Song Cycle. Triangle also features strings, brass, accordion, woodwinds, and numerous types of percussion.

== Release and reception ==
Professional ratings
Review scores
Source	Rating
AllMusic	4.5/5 stars

Released in July 1967, Triangle spent two weeks on the Billboard 200 albums chart, peaking at number 197. Though not a commercial success, the album gained an underground following and received critical acclaim. Sal Valentino's "expressive" vocals were compared to those of Bob Dylan by Crawdaddy!'s Paul Williams in 1968 and by Perfect Sound Forever's Steve Cooper in 2004. A 2007 review in Electric Roulette stated that Valentino's voice resembles Gene Clark of the Byrds, "but superior in tone and emotion". Williams, Cooper, and AllMusic's Stansted Montfichet praised Ron Elliott as a songwriter, with Montfichet adding that Elliott's "lyrical imagery ... is particularly striking" in the songs "Only Dreaming Now", "Painter of Women", and "The Wolf of Velvet Fortune". Australian journalist and author Lillian Roxon wrote in her 1969 Rock Encyclopedia that Triangle "was the album that astonished everyone and blew a million minds". Music journalist Jon Savage named the song "Magic Hollow" in his list of the "100 Greatest Psychedelic Classics" in the June 1997 issue of Mojo magazine. In 2006, Joel Selvin of the San Francisco Chronicle called the album a "cult classic", while SF Weekly's Justin F. Farrar remarked that it "has aged far more gracefully than that almighty concept record from '67, Sgt. Pepper's." Brendan McGrath of The Rising Storm wrote in a 2007 review that "Triangle has everything: it's a tightly produced country record that is rooted in rock; it's straight and folky and underlined by psychedelic imagery". Author Tom Moon selected the album for his 2008 book, 1,000 Recordings to Hear Before You Die, in which he wrote that Triangle "captured the crisscrossing events of 1967" and was "the rare bridge between the sunny straightforwardness of mid-60s pop and the fuzzy opaqueness of psychedelia". During a 2005 broadcast of Fresh Air, National Public Radio's Ken Tucker said that Triangle comes "perilously close to stuffy art rock." The album was re-released in 2002 by Collectors' Choice Music. Kim Cooper of Scram magazine said the reissue was "long overdue" and noted that "the remaster really brings out the arrangements' complexity".

== Chart performance ==
Chart (1967)	Peak position
U.S. Billboard 200	197

== Track listing ==
=== Side one ===
No.	Title	Writer(s)	Length
1.	"Are You Happy?"	Bob Durand, Ron Elliott	2:17
2.	"Only Dreaming Now"	Elliott, Sal Valentino	2:06
3.	"Painter of Women"	Durand, Elliott	2:51
4.	"The Keeper of Time"	Durand, Elliott	2:09
5.	"It Won't Get Better"	Elliott, Valentino	2:02
6.	"Nine Pound Hammer"	Merle Travis	3:19

=== Side two ===
No.	Title	Writer(s)	Length
1.	"Magic Hollow"	Elliott, Valentino	2:53
2.	"And I've Seen Her"	Durand, Elliott	1:59
3.	"Triangle"	Elliott, Valentino	2:17
4.	"The Wolf of Velvet Fortune"	Elliott, Valentino	4:52
5.	"Old Kentucky Home"	Randy Newman	2:05

== Personnel ==
- Ron Elliott – guitar, arranger, vocals
- Ron Meagher – bass, guitar, vocals
- Sal Valentino – vocals, vocal arranger
- Van Dyke Parks – harpsichord, keyboards
- Carol Kaye – bass
- James Burton – guitar
- Donnie Lanier – guitar
- Jim Gordon – drums
- The Blossoms – backing vocals
- Gene Garf – accordion
- Lou Klass – violin
- Shari Zippert – violin
- David Duke – French horn
- George Hyde – French horn
- Gale Robinson – French horn
- Jesse Ehrlich – cello
- Raymond Kelley – cello
- Dick Hyde – trombone
