= Don't Talk to Strangers (The Beau Brummels song) =

- 2000 Italian LP

Single by The Beau Brummels

from the album The Beau Brummels, Volume 2
- B-side: "In Good Time"
- Released: September 1965
- Recorded: 21 August 1965
- Studio: Coast Recorders, Inc., San Francisco, California
- Genre: Folk rock
- Length: 2:20
- Label: Autumn
- Songwriters: Ron Elliott, Bob Durand
- Producer: Sylvester "Sly Stone" Stewart

The Beau Brummels singles chronology
"You Tell Me Why" (1965)	"Don't Talk to Strangers" (1965)	"Good Time Music" (1965)

"Don't Talk to Strangers" is a song by American rock group The Beau Brummels, released as the second single from the band's second album, The Beau Brummels, Volume 2. The song later appeared on the band's 1987 compilation album The Best of The Beau Brummels 1964–1968. The single peaked at number 52 on the Billboard Hot 100 in November 1965; its relatively low chart placement possibly being the result of the band's label, Autumn Records, verging on collapse at the time. The song reached number 16 on the Canadian singles chart.

"Don't Talk to Strangers" was written by Ron Elliott and Bob Durand. Sylvester Stewart, later known as Sly Stone, produced the track. The song has received generally positive reviews in the decades since its release. San Francisco Chronicle music critic Joel Selvin called the song inventive, while author Maury Dean praised the song's "raging chord patterns and dynamic harmonies," and called the instrumental bridge "second to none in punch and pulse in power." The song has been criticized, however, for sounding too similar to The Byrds in regard to the harmonies and twelve-string guitar licks.

A live performance of the song from February 1974 is included on the band's 2000 Live! album, which was recorded in Fair Oaks Village near Sacramento, California.

== Track listing ==
7" Vinyl

No.	Title	Writer(s)	Length
1.	"Don't Talk to Strangers"	Elliott, Durand	2:20
2.	"In Good Time"	Elliott	1:47

== Chart performance ==
Chart (1965)	Peak position
U.S. Billboard Hot 100	52
U.S. Cash Box Top 100 Singles	53
Canadian Singles Chart	16
