= You Tell Me Why =

Single by The Beau Brummels

from the album The Beau Brummels, Volume 2
- B-side: "I Want You"
- Released: July 1965
- Recorded: 28 May, 1 & 11 June 1965
- Studio: Coast Recorders, Inc., San Francisco, California
- Genre: Folk rock
- Length: 2:45
- Label: Autumn
- Songwriter: Ron Elliott
- Producer: Sylvester "Sly Stone" Stewart

The Beau Brummels singles chronology
"Just a Little" (1965)	"You Tell Me Why" (1965)	"Don't Talk to Strangers" (1965)

"You Tell Me Why" is a song by American rock group The Beau Brummels, from the band's second album, The Beau Brummels, Volume 2. The song was written by guitarist Ron Elliott and produced by Sylvester Stewart, later known as Sly Stone. "You Tell Me Why" was released as the album's lead single, and peaked at number 38 on the Billboard Hot 100 in August 1965. The band revisited the song and included it on their 1975 eponymous album. The original version later appeared on the band's 1987 compilation album The Best of The Beau Brummels 1964–1968.

== Release and reception ==
Released in the summer of 1965, "You Tell Me Why" was the Beau Brummels' third and final U.S. top 40 hit, reaching number 38 in August. The song peaked at number eight in Canada, making it the third consecutive single by the band to reach the top 10 on the Canadian Singles Chart.

The song was written by Ron Elliott and produced by Sylvester Stewart, later known as Sly Stone, although his involvement, according to Elliott and lead vocalist Sal Valentino, had diminished to the point the band does not recall any producer being in charge. SF Weekly journalist Justin F. Farrar said the song was "so prescient of the lush, melancholic vibe of early Jefferson Airplane that Marty Balin must have been digging it." Allmusic writer Matthew Greenwald called it one of the band's "finest early ballads."

The single's B-side, "I Want You," was also written by Elliott. Music critic and author Richie Unterberger said it was "as good as any song the Beau Brummels ever did, with its dense humming harmonies and spellbinding melody.

== Other versions ==
The Beau Brummels re-recorded "You Tell Me Why" on their self-titled 1975 reunion album. It was the only remake of the band's older material to appear on the album. A live performance of the song from February 1974 is included on the band's 2000 Live! album, which was recorded in Fair Oaks Village near Sacramento, California. Australian surf rock band The Atlantics released a cover version of the song as the B-side to their 1967 single "Come On." Acoustic guitarist Leo Kottke included his rendition of the song on his 1974 album, Ice Water.

== Track listing ==
7" Vinyl

No.	Title	Writer(s)	Length
1.	"You Tell Me Why"	Elliott	3:04
2.	"I Want You"	Elliott	2:57

== Chart performance ==
Chart (1965)	Peak position
U.S. Billboard Hot 100	38
U.S. Cash Box Top 100 Singles	36
Canadian Singles Chart	8
