= Vault =

Vault may refer to:

- Jumping, the act of propelling oneself upwards

== Architecture ==
- Vault (architecture), an arched form above an enclosed space
- Bank vault, a reinforced room or compartment where valuables are stored
- Burial vault (enclosure), a protective coffin enclosure
- Burial vault (tomb), an underground tomb
- Utility vault, an underground storage area accessed by a maintenance hole
- Film vault, in film preservation, a climate-controlled storage facility for films
- Pub vault, a working men's bar in northern English pubs

== Arts, entertainment, and media ==
- Vault (Marvel Comics), a prison for super-villains in the Marvel Comics universe
- Vaults (Fallout), underground nuclear blast shelters in the Fallout video game series
- Vault (sculpture), a sculpture by Ron Robertson-Swann
- Vault (film), a 2019 film based on the 1975 Bonded Vault heist
- "Vault" (Due South), a 1995 television episode

=== Music ===
- Vaults (band), a music group from London
- Vault, former drummer for the band Dark Lunacy
- Vault: Def Leppard Greatest Hits (1980–1995), an album
- "Vault", a song by Marnie Stern from This Is It and I Am It and You Are It and So Is That and He Is It and She Is It and It Is It and That Is That
- "Vault", a song by Pendulum

== Brands and enterprises ==
- Vault (drink), a discontinued soft drink made by the Coca-Cola Company from 2005 to 2011
- Vault.com (formerly Vault Reports), a recruitment company founded by Mark Oldman

== Computing and technology ==
- Vault (revision control system), made by SourceGear
- Vault, a cross-platform password manager and authentication tool maintained by HashiCorp
- Autodesk Vault, a data management tool from Autodesk
- Microsoft HealthVault, a web-based personal health record

== Mathematics and science ==
- Vault (organelle), a ribonucleoprotein found in biological cells
- Vault, in mathematics, a bisected bicylinder Steinmetz solid
- Cranial vault, a space in the skull within the neurocranium
- Vaginal vault, an expanded part of the vaginal canal

== Sports ==
- Vault (gymnastics), an artistic gymnastics apparatus
- Vault (parkour), a movement to get past an obstacle quickly and efficiently
- Equestrian vaulting, a sport that combines gymnastics and dance on a moving horse
- Pole vault, an athletics event

== Other uses ==
- Svalbard Global Seed Vault (or Doomsday Vault), a secure seed bank in Norway
- Vault Beach (also Bow Beach), Cornwall, England, UK
- Vault Comics, an American comic book publisher

== See also ==
- List of architectural vault types
- The Vault (disambiguation)
- Treasury
- Voltigeurs
