= From the Vault =

From the Vault or From the Vaults may refer to:

- From The Vault, a melodycore band from Bielefeld, Germany
- From the Vault (Magic: The Gathering), a series of limited-edition card sets for the Magic: the Gathering trading-card game
- From the Vaults (Nazareth album), an album released by hard rock band Nazareth in 1993
- From the Vault (Spock's Beard album), an album released by progressive rock band Spock's Beard in 1997
- From the Vaults (The Beau Brummels album), an album released by rock band The Beau Brummels in 1982
- "From The Vault", previously unreleased tracks included by Taylor Swift in re-recorded versions of her old albums, as well as deluxe editions of some new albums

== See also ==
- SHT: From The Vault EP, a digital EP released by electro-pop duo 3OH!3 in 2012
- Stories from the Vaults, a behind-the-scenes series focusing on the Smithsonian Institution
- Tales from the Vault, a Doctor Who audio drama by Big Finish Productions
- View from the Vault, a four-part series of live DVDs and companion soundtracks by the Grateful Dead
