= The Beau Brummels, Volume 2 =

Studio album by the Beau Brummels
- Released: October 1965
- Recorded: April–August 1965
- Studio: Coast Recorders (San Francisco, CA)
- Genre: Pop rock, folk rock
- Length: 30:17
- Label: Autumn
- Producer: Sylvester "Sly Stone" Stewart

The Beau Brummels chronology
Introducing the Beau Brummels (1965)	The Beau Brummels, Volume 2 (1965)	Beau Brummels '66 (1966)

Professional ratings
Review scores
Source	Rating
Allmusic	4/5 stars

The Beau Brummels, Volume 2 is the second studio album by the American rock group the Beau Brummels. Released in October 1965, the album contains the U.S. top 40 hit "You Tell Me Why" and follow-up single "Don't Talk to Strangers."

The album was produced by Sylvester Stewart, later known as Sly Stone, although his involvement, according to lead singer Sal Valentino and guitarist-songwriter Ron Elliott, had diminished to the point the band does not recall any producer being in charge.

Volume 2, unlike the band's debut, Introducing the Beau Brummels, failed to chart on the Billboard 200. The album's lack of commercial success has been linked to the band's label, Autumn Records, verging on collapse at the time of the album's release, leading to a lack of distribution and promotion of the band's material.

== Track listing ==
All songs written by Ron Elliott, except where noted.

=== Side 1 ===
1. "You Tell Me Why" — 3:05
2. "I Want You" — 4:00
3. "Doesn't Matter" — 2:00
4. "That's Alright" (Sal Valentino) — 2:12
5. "Sometime at Night" (Bob Durand, Elliott) — 1:50
6. "Can It Be" (Durand, Elliott) — 2:28

=== Side 2 ===
1. "Sad Little Girl" — 3:30
2. "Woman" (Durand, Elliott) — 2:48
3. "Don't Talk to Strangers" (Durand, Elliott) — 2:21
4. "I've Never Known" (Durand, Elliott) — 2:03
5. "When It Comes to Your Love" — 2:11
6. "In Good Time" — 1:49

== Personnel ==
- Sal Valentino - vocals, harmonica, tambourine
- Ron Elliott - lead guitar, backing vocals, lead vocal on "Doesn't Matter"
- Declan Mulligan - guitar, lead vocal on "Woman" (mixed out)
- Ron Meagher - bass, backing vocals
- John Petersen - drums, lead vocal on "Sometimes At Night"
