= Beau Brummels '66 =

Studio album by the Beau Brummels
- Released: May 1966
- Recorded: February–Spring 1966
- Studios: Golden State Recorders (San Francisco, CA) Mira Sound (New York)
- Genres: Pop rock, folk rock
- Length: 33:20
- Label: Warner Bros.
- Producer: Bob Mitchell

The Beau Brummels chronology
The Beau Brummels, Volume 2 (1965)	Beau Brummels '66 (1966)	Triangle (1967)

Professional ratings
Review scores
Source	Rating
Allmusic	2/5 stars

Beau Brummels '66 is the third studio album by the American rock group the Beau Brummels, and their first on Warner Bros. Records. The album consists of twelve cover songs and no originals. Autumn Records, the band's previous label, had sold the band to Warner Brothers in early 1966. Warner Brothers, however, did not control the publishing rights, and opted to have the band record an album of covers, including songs originally performed by The Beatles and Bob Dylan, as well as recent hit singles by such acts as The Mamas & the Papas and Simon & Garfunkel. Lead vocalist Sal Valentino explained, "When we went to Warner Brothers, they were just anxious to get a record out, to capitalize on the success we had. That record was the wrong one to do at the time."

The album features Don Irving on guitar. Irving briefly became a member of the Beau Brummels filling in for Ron Elliott, who also played on the album, but was unable to withstand the rigors of touring due to his diabetic condition.

== Track listing ==
1. "You've Got to Hide Your Love Away" (John Lennon, Paul McCartney) — 3:41
2. "Mr. Tambourine Man" (Bob Dylan) — 3:49
3. "Louie Louie" (Richard Berry) — 2:10
4. "Homeward Bound" (Paul Simon) — 2:44
5. "These Boots Are Made for Walkin'" (Lee Hazlewood) — 2:53
6. "Yesterday" (Lennon, McCartney) — 2:37
7. "Bang Bang" (Sonny Bono) — 1:56
8. "Hang On Sloopy" (Wes Farrell, Bert Russell) — 2:52
9. "Play with Fire" (Mick Jagger, Keith Richards) — 2:56
10. "Woman" (Bernard Webb [aka Paul McCartney]) — 2:02
11. "Mrs. Brown, You've Got a Lovely Daughter" (Trevor Peacock) — 2:39
12. "Monday, Monday" (John Phillips) — 2:47
