= John Petersen (musician) =

American drummer (1942–2007)

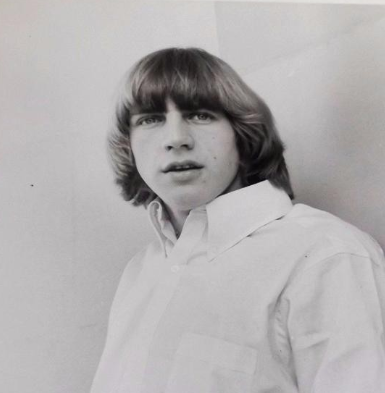
- Petersen in 1965

Background information
- Born: John Louis Petersen; January 8, 1945 (birth certificate says 1942); Rudyard, Michigan, U.S.
- Died: November 11, 2007 (aged 65) Sierra Madre, California, U.S.
- Genres: Pop rock, baroque pop, folk rock, garage rock
- Occupation: Drummer
- Years active: 1964–2002

John Louis Petersen (January 8, 1942 – November 11, 2007) was an American drummer, most notably for rock bands The Beau Brummels and Harpers Bizarre.

== Early life ==
John Petersen was born to Louis Sylvester Petersen and Mila Marie Williams in Rudyard, Michigan, on January 8, 1942, and moved to San Francisco at the age of five years old. Petersen attended Longfellow Elementary School in Long Beach as a child.

== Career ==
In 1964 Petersen joined the Beau Brummels, whose first two singles, "Laugh, Laugh" and "Just a Little", reached the U.S. top 20. He appeared with the band in the 1965 science-fiction/comedy movie Village of the Giants, which was featured in a 1994 episode of Mystery Science Theater 3000. Petersen also appeared with the band as The Beau Brummelstones on The Flintstones television animated sitcom in the season six episode "Shinrock A Go-Go," which originally aired on December 3, 1965.

Petersen left the group after their third album, Beau Brummels '66, to join Harpers Bizarre. Formerly known as the Tikis, Harpers Bizarre had a top 20 hit with a remake of Simon & Garfunkel's "The 59th Street Bridge Song (Feelin' Groovy)" in 1967. The group broke up in 1970, but Petersen returned for a reunion album in 1976. Petersen also occasionally reunited with the Beau Brummels. In 1975, he played with and recorded on the band's self-titled album.

Touring had heightened tensions within the Beau Brummels and soon led to the departure of Declan Mulligan. Not long after that lead guitarist Ron Elliott was no longer able to perform live after suffering seizures from his diabetic condition. Elliott's father, who managed the Beau Brummels was recommended to recruit Don Irving as a temporary replacement on the road. Don Irving became a permanent member in early 1966, and he performed on the band's third album—and first on Warner Bros. Records—Beau Brummels '66. He also played on the band's single, "One Too Many Mornings", a Bob Dylan cover. John Petersen recalled, "Don Irving was really cool. He played all of Ron Elliott's licks perfectly. By then we had three albums and we were still a good draw but the vibes in the band weren't healthy. It was really strained. I would go out to Laurel Canyon and people weren't talking to each other. By the time we got sold to Warner Brothers, we weren't the same band anymore". Following that album's release, John Petersen left the band to join Harpers Bizarre.

== Personal life ==
Petersen married Roberta Templeman, sister of Harpers Bizarre's Ted Templeman, in 1969. Roberta Templeman became a vice president at Warner Bros. Records in the 1980s. Petersen died from a heart attack on November 11, 2007, at the age of 62. Roberta died at age 74 on August 15, 2019, after battling dementia.

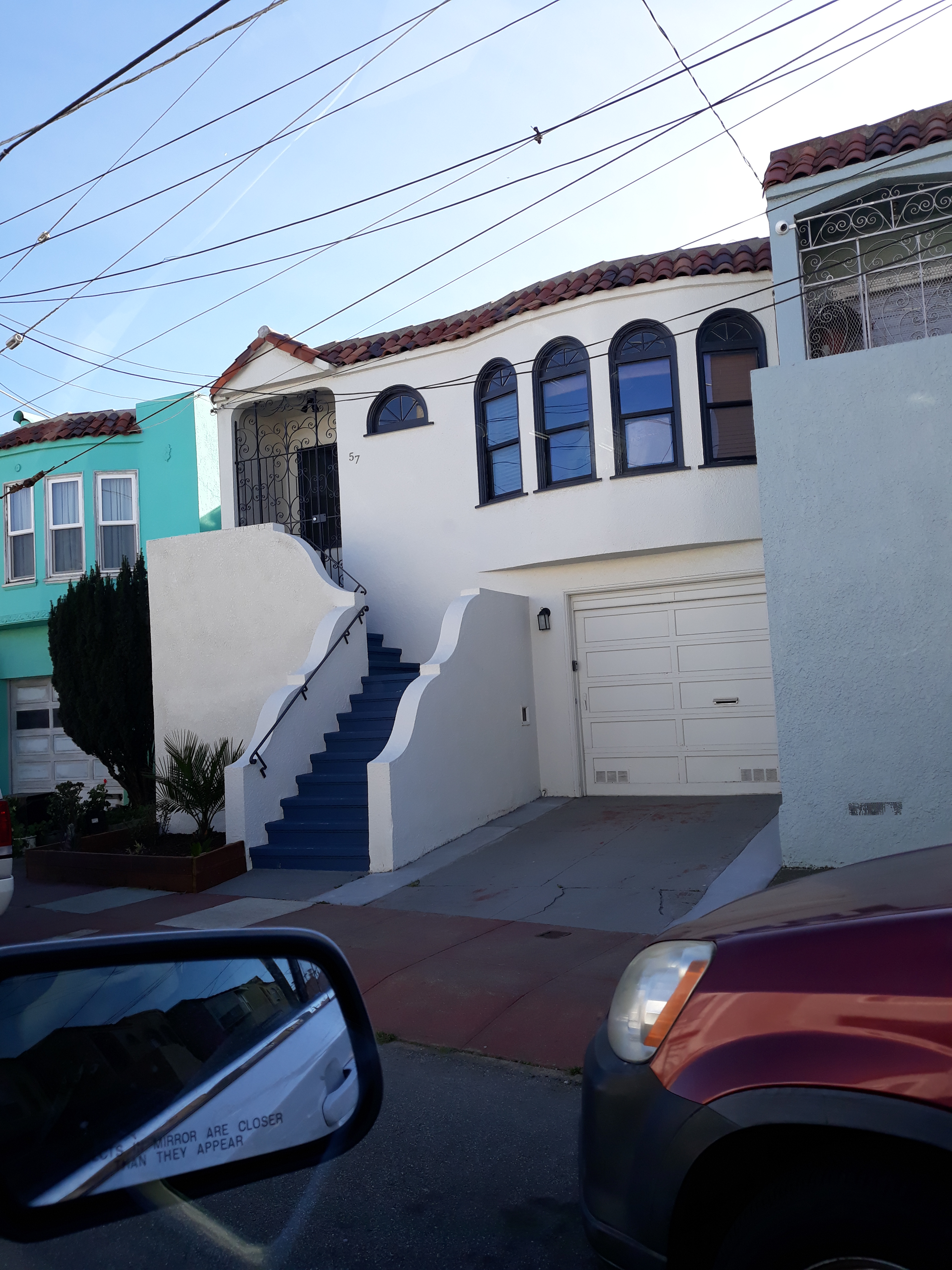
The house where Petersen lived from 1964 to 1966, when he was a member of The Beau Brummels
