= Laugh, Laugh =

1964 single by the Beau Brummels

- French EP

Single by the Beau Brummels

from the album Introducing the Beau Brummels
- B-side: "Still In Love With You Baby"
- Released: December 1964
- Recorded: 3 November 1964
- Studio: Golden State Recorders, San Francisco, California
- Genre: Folk rock; pop rock; beat
- Length: 2:48
- Label: Autumn
- Songwriter: Ron Elliott
- Producer: Sylvester "Sly Stone" Stewart

The Beau Brummels singles chronology
| "Laugh, Laugh" (1964) | "Just a Little" (1965) |

"Laugh, Laugh" is a song by American rock group the Beau Brummels, written by guitarist Ron Elliott and produced by Sylvester Stewart, later known as Sly Stone. Released in December 1964 as the band's debut single, the song reached number 15 on the U.S. Billboard Hot 100 chart the following February. "Laugh, Laugh" was one of the first hit single to come out of the emerging San Francisco music scene in response to the British Invasion. The song was later included on the band's first full-length album, Introducing the Beau Brummels, released in April 1965.

The Beau Brummels promoted the singles by appearing on several television shows, including a 1965 episode of The Flintstones in which the band gave an animated performance as the Beau Brummelstones. In 1994, "Laugh, Laugh" was selected to The Rock and Roll Hall of Fame's 500 Songs that Shaped Rock and Roll exhibit. Lead singer Sal Valentino reworked the song for his 2008 solo album, Every Now and Then.

== Background and composition ==
In 1964, San Francisco disc jockeys Tom Donahue and Bobby Mitchell were looking for new acts to bring to their Autumn Records label. They discovered the Beau Brummels performing at the Morocco Room, a club in nearby San Mateo, and signed the band shortly thereafter. Donahue and Mitchell were eager to capitalize on Beatlemania, a phenomenon surrounding the Beatles that originated several years before in Germany and was spreading across the U.S. by this time. The Beau Brummels had taken their name, a British term for an excessively well-dressed person, suggested to them, which lead singer Valentino maintained they didn't even know how to spell. Even the harmonies of "Laugh, Laugh" were reminiscent of popular British acts of the time, such as the Beatles and the Zombies. However, songwriter-guitarist Ron Elliott said the song was directly influenced not by UK bands, but by U.S. pop group the Four Seasons.

Elliott grew up writing music inspired by theatrical composers such as George Gershwin and Jerome Kern, as well as country music artist Lefty Frizzell. After forming the Beau Brummels with lead vocalist Sal Valentino, Elliott wanted to create simplified music that had mainstream appeal. He noted that "Laugh, Laugh" had a "very complex chord structure, but instead of using the major seventh chords and the passing chords that I prefer, I wrote the song in flat major and minor keys using a simplified tonal structure." Elliott said he liked using minor keys as he believed they added an element of mystery to the music, similar to that of James Bond films. Lyrically, "Laugh, Laugh" describes a rejected lover who takes pleasure in revenge when someone rejects the one who had rejected him.

The song features a harmonica, played by Declan Mulligan, throughout the tune.

The originally-released version of "Laugh, Laugh," universally heard in 1965 when it was a hit, fades out just before the second iteration of the line "Lonely/Oh so lonely." The full version does not fade out, but rather ends "cold" on an E chord. As most oldies radio stations today play songs provided by a music service rather than actual records, the version with the cold ending is heard almost universally now. This version also features a "yeah" uttered by Sal Valentino between the two iterations of "lonely" that was edited out of the original release.

The song was produced by Autumn house producer Sylvester Stewart, who later gained fame as Sly Stone of Sly & the Family Stone. Valentino recalled the band's recording sessions with Stone: "He was only about nineteen or twenty when we worked with him. It was before all of his reputation came to be, that everybody knows him for now." Valentino added, "He was a cheerleader. He could play everything if we needed him to. He was great. He was the guy in San Francisco who knew how to make a record in the studio. There was nobody before him." Elliott agreed, saying Stone was a positive influence on the band because of his talent, intelligence and experience.

== Release and reception ==
"Laugh, Laugh"
A sample of "Laugh, Laugh" from the Beau Brummels' 1965 album, Introducing the Beau Brummels. This sample illustrates the song shifting from the first verse to the chorus.

"Laugh, Laugh" was released in December 1964, seven months after the band's formation. In January 1965, the song entered the Billboard Hot 100 at number 96. The song remained in the top 40 portion of the chart for eight weeks, peaking at number 15 in February. Donahue believed the single would have peaked at number one if the band was on a label with stronger distribution. In Canada, the song reached number two on RPM magazine's singles chart. As the song climbed the charts, many listeners assumed the Beau Brummels were British, due to the band's name and musical style. For their part, Donahue and Mitchell spread rumors that the band was indeed from the UK, and had the band dress in Beatlesque suits.

"Laugh, Laugh" was one of the first hit single from a burgeoning San Francisco music scene—including such bands as Jefferson Airplane, the Grateful Dead, We Five, Quicksilver Messenger Service and Country Joe and the Fish— to respond to the British Invasion. The song is credited as one of the earliest tracks to blend beat music with folk rock, even before the Byrds recorded "Mr. Tambourine Man." Chris Hillman, who played bass guitar with the Byrds, saw the Beau Brummels at a Los Angeles concert, and later remarked: "I remember them doing the hit they had, 'Laugh, Laugh.' They really sort of answered the Beatles before we did, in that sense." However, Byrds singer-guitarist Roger McGuinn claimed "they had a little trouble singing in tune." Record World commented on the song's "dynamism" and said that the Beau Brummels "sing and play with a splendid slant toward the contemporary teenage beat." The song was one of 10 pop singles named in a January 1966 issue of Billboard which credited the use of harmonica in folk, pop, and rhythm and blues (R&B) music for sparking a harmonica sales boom at record retailers in 1964 and 1965.

Music critic Dave Marsh selected the song for his 1989 book, The Heart of Rock & Soul: The 1001 Greatest Singles Ever Made. William Ruhlmann of Allmusic called it a "pivotal" song with "cleverly arranged harmonies." On the other hand, Chris Smith of Stylus Magazine described it as a "mostly colorless, indistinct Beatles rip-off" and "pretty unmemorable." In 1994, the Rock and Roll Hall of Fame's curatorial staff, along with rock critics and historians, selected "Laugh, Laugh" for a Hall of Fame exhibit featuring The 500 Songs that Shaped Rock and Roll."

== In popular culture ==
The Beau Brummels performed "Laugh, Laugh" on several television music variety shows of the mid-1960s, including NBC's Hullabaloo on February 23, 1965, ABC's Shindig! on March 10, 1965 and American Bandstand on April 9, 1966. In September 1965, the Beatles' self-titled animated television series debuted and became an immediate ratings success. As a result, animation studios moved quickly to incorporate cartoon rock bands into other programs. An early effort by Hanna-Barbera showcased the Beau Brummels as animated guests on The Flintstones sitcom in the season six episode "Shinrock A Go-Go," which originally aired on December 3, 1965. Appearing as The Beau Brummelstones, the band performed "Laugh, Laugh" on Bedrock's TV teen dance show, Shinrock—a takeoff of the Shindig! program.

"Laugh, Laugh" was included on the 1998 four-CD expanded edition of Nuggets: Original Artyfacts from the First Psychedelic Era, 1965–1968, a collection of American garage rock singles that helped influence the development of 1970s punk rock. (It was not included in the original 1972 compilation double album).

The song was also featured in the 1989 John Candy comedy film Uncle Buck.

== Other versions ==
An alternate take appears on the Beau Brummels' 1996 three-disc box set San Fran Sessions, a collection of rarities, demos and outtakes. The band's Live! album, released in 2000, contains a 1974 performance of "Laugh, Laugh" recorded during a concert in Fair Oaks Village near Sacramento, California. Sal Valentino revisited the song on his 2008 solo album, Every Now and Then, on which he offers a darker interpretation of the track. Surf rock group the Astronauts performed a cover version of "Laugh, Laugh" on their 1967 album, Travelin' Man. The song was also covered by California garage rock band the E-Types, whose live rendition is part of the Live at the Rainbow Ballroom 1966 album, released in 1998. Experimental musician R. Stevie Moore recorded a version of the song on his 1983 album, Crises. Rob Seel released a version in 2017, which includes performances by Mark Dawson of the Grass Roots and Grip Weeds members Kurt Reil, Rick Reil, and Kristin Pinell.

== Credits and personnel ==
The Beau Brummels

- Sal Valentino – lead vocals, tambourine
- Ron Elliott – acoustic guitar, vocals
- Ron Meagher – bass guitar, vocals
- Declan Mulligan – electric guitar, harmonica, vocals
- John Petersen – drums

Production team

- Sylvester Stewart – producer
- Leo de Gar Kulka – engineer

== Chart performance ==
| Chart (1964–65) | Peak position |
|---|---|
| Australia | 78 |
| Canadian Singles Chart | 2 |
| U.S. Billboard Hot 100 | 15 |
| U.S. Cash Box Top 100 | 17 |
