= Declan Mulligan =

Irish-American guitarist (1938–2021)

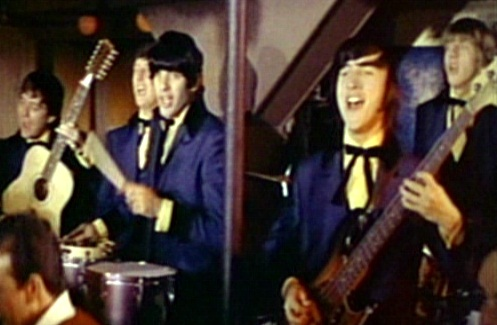
- The Beau Brummels in Village of the Giants (1965). From left: Ron Elliott, Declan Mulligan, Sal Valentino, Ron Meagher, John Petersen.

Background information
- Birth name: John Declan Mulligan
- Born: April 4, 1938; Fethard, County Tipperary, Ireland
- Died: November 2, 2021 (aged 83); Petaluma, California, U.S.
- Genres: Folk rock, pop rock, garage rock, blues-rock
- Occupation: Musician
- Instrument(s): Guitar, harmonica, vocals
- Years active: 1964–2021

John Declan Mulligan (April 4, 1938 – November 2, 2021) was an Irish-born American musician, best known as a guitarist of rock band The Beau Brummels in the 1960s.

== Life and career ==
Mulligan was born in Fethard, County Tipperary. He emigrated to Toronto, before moving to San Francisco in 1962. In early 1964, he met Ron Elliott, Sal Valentino, and John Petersen during an informal rehearsal at the Irish Cultural Center in San Francisco. After joining the Beau Brummels, who shortly thereafter also added Ron Meagher, Mulligan recorded perhaps his most memorable contribution with the band, the harmonica opening of the hit single "Laugh, Laugh", which reached the top 20 of the Billboard Hot 100 in February 1965.

He appeared with the band in the 1965 science-fiction/comedy movie Village of the Giants, which was featured in a 1994 episode of Mystery Science Theater 3000. He sings "Woman" in the film, a song written by Elliott, which ultimately appeared as an instrumental on the band's second album, with Mulligan's vocal being replaced by a lead guitar track. Mulligan also appears with the group in their one other movie appearance, "Wild Wild Winter", in which he delivers the band's only line of dialog. By the middle of 1965, Mulligan was no longer a member of the band. In 1966, he sued the band for $1.25 million in damages, claiming he was wrongfully dismissed from the group.

He later played in a local band "The Black Velvet Band", which in the early 1970s also included Meagher. He reunited with the Beau Brummels for a 1975 reunion album. After the original group broke up after its 1975 tour, Mulligan formed his own band, Mulligan Stew, which eventually fostered a revival of The Beau Brummels. At different times, the reformed band also included Ron Elliott, Sal Valentino and Ron Meagher.

In 1981, Mulligan and Elliott, along with new members, vocalist-bassist John Hjort (a.k.a. Jackson Hart), drummer Peter Tucker, and keyboardist James Moyles, released an independent single, "Back to Life" b/w "Native Son", a session produced by Vince Welnick of The Tubes and The Grateful Dead. Welnick also added keyboards and harmony vocals to the session. The recording failed to garner any substantial attention.

Mulligan died in November 2021, at the age of 83.

== Discography ==
With The Beau Brummels

- Introducing the Beau Brummels (1965)
- The Beau Brummels, Vol. 2 (1965)
- The Beau Brummels (1975)
