= Bradley's Barn (album) =

Studio album by the Beau Brummels
- Released: October 1968
- Recorded: February 1968
- Studios: Bradley's Barn (Mt. Juliet, Tennessee) T.T. & G Studios (Los Angeles) Hollywood (string overdubs only)
- Genres: Folk rock, country rock, pop rock
- Length: 32:12
- Label: Warner Bros.-Seven Arts
- Producer: Lenny Waronker

The Beau Brummels chronology
Triangle (1967)	Bradley's Barn (1968)	The Beau Brummels (1975)

Singles from Bradley's Barn
- 1. "Long Walking Down to Misery" Released: 1968; 2. "Cherokee Girl" Released: 1969

Professional ratings
Review scores
Source	Rating
AllMusic	4.0/5 stars
American Songwriter	4.0/4 stars

Bradley's Barn is the fifth studio album by the American rock group The Beau Brummels. Released in October 1968, it contains the singles "Long Walking Down to Misery" and "Cherokee Girl." The album has received critical acclaim as an early example of country rock. The album was named after the recording studio owned by Owen Bradley where the album was recorded.

== Recording ==
By 1968, bassist Ron Meagher had left the Beau Brummels after having been drafted into military service, reducing the band to a duo consisting of lead vocalist Sal Valentino and composer-guitarist Ron Elliott. They worked on a new album at Bradley's Barn, a recording studio just outside of Nashville in Mount Juliet, Tennessee, joined by prominent Nashville session musicians such as Kenny Buttrey, a drummer on Bob Dylan's albums from 1966 to 1969, and guitarist Jerry Reed. The Beau Brummels were so pleased with the results at the studio that they named the album Bradley's Barn. According to Elliott, the sound was not too different from the band's previous album, Triangle, just with more country accents.

The Beau Brummels split up shortly after the album was completed, though they would reunite briefly in 1975. The Everly Brothers covered album track "Turn Around" for their 1968 Roots album, on which Elliott worked as an arranger.

== Track listing ==
No.	Title	Writer(s)	Length
1.	"Turn Around"	Bob Durand, Elliott	3:03
2.	"An Added Attraction (Come and See Me)"	Valentino	3:03
3.	"Deep Water"	Elliott, Valentino	2:33
4.	"Long Walking Down to Misery"	Elliott	3:16
5.	"Little Bird"	Elliott	2:42
6.	"Cherokee Girl"	Durand, Elliott	3:36
7.	"I'm a Sleeper"	Elliott, Valentino	3:20
8.	"Loneliest Man in Town"	Elliott	1:54
9.	"Love Can Fall a Long Way Down"	Durand, Elliott	4:16
10.	"Jessica"	Elliott, Valentino	2:22
11.	"Bless You California"	Randy Newman	2:16

=== 2011 re-issue ===
In June 2011, Bradley's Barn was re-issued by Rhino Handmade as a deluxe hardback set, expanded to two discs that include alternate takes, unreleased songs and an October 1968 radio interview with the two band members. This expanded edition was named one of the '10 Best Reissues of the Year' by Rolling Stone.

Expanded edition, disc one
No.	Title	Length
1.	"Turn Around"	3:02
2.	"An Added Attraction (Come And See Me)"	3:02
3.	"Deep Water"	2:33
4.	"Long Walking Down To Misery"	3:14
5.	"Little Bird"	2:39
6.	"Cherokee Girl"	3:40
7.	"I'm A Sleeper"	3:20
8.	"The Loneliest Man In Town"	1:52
9.	"Love Can Fall A Long Way Down"	4:15
10.	"Jessica"	2:21
11.	"Bless You California"	2:23
12.	"Lift Me"	2:41
13.	"I Love You Mama" (Alternate Version)	2:22
14.	"Just A Little Bit Of Lovin'" (Demo)	3:09
15.	"Tan Oak Tree"	2:30
16.	"Another"	2:58
17.	"High There"	2:59
18.	"Black Crow" (Demo - Stereo Mix)	2:47

Expanded edition, disc two
No.	Title	Length
1.	"Deep Water" (Alternate Version)	3:23
2.	"Love Can Fall A Long Way Down" (Alternate Mix)	4:28
3.	"Jessica" (Alternate Version)	2:25
4.	"Bittersweet"	2:48
5.	"I'll Be Your Baby Tonight" (Alternate Take)	3:01
6.	"Long Black Veil"	4:21
7.	"Lift Me" (Alternate Take)	2:26
8.	"42nd Street" (credited to Lionel Reeves & Stella Parker)	1:36
9.	"Another" (Alternate Demo)	3:20
10.	"Confessions" (Demo)	4:16
11.	"An Added Attraction (Come And See Me)" (Alternate Version; performed by Sal Valentino)	4:31
12.	"A Little At A Time" (performed by Sal Valentino)	2:54
13.	"Down In The Flood" (performed by Sal Valentino)	3:40
14.	"Home Of The Blues" (performed by Sal Valentino)	3:13
15.	"Alligator Man" (performed by Sal Valentino)	2:39
16.	"Silkie" (performed by Sal Valentino)	3:10
17.	"A Song For Rochelle" (performed by Sal Valentino)	4:49
18.	"Friends And Lovers" (performed by Sal Valentino)	2:46
19.	"Radio Interview" (originally broadcast on San Francisco's KMPX-FM in October 1968)	11:31

== Personnel ==
- David Briggs – keyboards
- Kenny Buttrey – drums
- Ron Elliott – guitar, vocals
- Joe Osborn – bass
- Norbert Putnam – bass
- Jerry Reed – guitar
- Sal Valentino – vocals
