= Ron Meagher =

American bassist (born 1941)

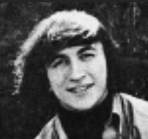
- Meagher in 1965

Background information
- Born: October 2, 1945 (81); Oakland, California, U.S.
- Genres: Folk rock, pop rock, garage rock
- Occupation: Bassist
- Years active: 1964–present

Ron Meagher (born October 2, 1945) is an American musician, best known as the bassist of the rock band The Beau Brummels.

== The Beau Brummels ==
When guitarist-songwriter Ron Elliott was putting the band together in 1964, he asked a friend, Kay Dane, if she knew any good bass players. Dane recommended Meagher, but cautioned, "He's kind of weird. He has long hair!" After joining the band, Meagher proved to be important to the band's image, as he was one of the first American rock musicians with Beatlesque hair. In addition to providing backing vocals, Meagher sang lead on occasion, as on "They'll Make You Cry," a song from the band's 1965 debut album, Introducing the Beau Brummels. Meagher appeared with the band in the 1965 science-fiction/comedy movie Village of the Giants, which was featured in a 1994 episode of Mystery Science Theater 3000. He remained with the band as it reduced from a quintet to a trio by 1967's critically acclaimed album Triangle.

During the recording of the band's next album, 1968's Bradley's Barn, Meagher was drafted, becoming one of the few musicians from a well-known rock band to serve in the military at the height of the Vietnam War. Over the next three decades, Meagher has also participated in several Beau Brummels revivals, most notably in the mid-1970s when the band released a 1975 self-titled reunion album. After he was discharged two years later, Meagher played in the Black Velvet Band with former Beau Brummels bandmate Declan Mulligan.
