= Tom Donahue (DJ) =

American DJ

Tom "Big Daddy" Donahue
- Born: Thomas Coman; May 21, 1928; South Bend, Indiana
- Died: April 28, 1975 (aged 46)
- Occupations: DJ, record producer, concert promoter
- Known for: Free-form radio

Tom "Big Daddy" Donahue (May 21, 1928 – April 28, 1975), was an American rock and roll radio disc jockey, record producer and concert promoter.

== Early life ==
Donahue was born Thomas Francis Coman in South Bend, Indiana, United States. He was the son of Thomas F. Coman and his wife, Mary Jane. Both Mary Jane and Thomas worked in journalism, at the South Bend (Indiana) News-Times. After Thomas Sr. was hired as a reporter by the Associated Press in Detroit, the family relocated to that city in 1934. When the A.P. moved Thomas Sr. to Washington D.C., the family relocated there, around 1938.

== Early career ==
Donahue's radio career started in early 1949 on the East Coast of the U.S. at WTIP in Charleston, West Virginia, then affiliated with the Mutual Broadcasting System. He hosted a morning program called "Coffee With Coman." Several years later, he was hired by WIBG in Philadelphia, where he also hosted the morning show. Donahue wrote a weekly column about top-40 music and reviewed some of the new singles. In addition, during the mid-1950s, he had a brief political career, as a leader in the Bristol Township Democratic Party. After nine years with WIBG, he suddenly left the station in early 1960. It was later revealed that Donahue left as a probe of payola at WIBG and other top-40 stations was getting underway. Documents made public during the payola scandal showed that he had been given more than $1,400 by Philadelphia's Universal Record Distributing Co. to play certain records during the period from 1957 to 1959. Donahue briefly worked at WINX in Maryland, but fall-out from the payola scandal was ongoing; it involved such big names as Alan Freed and Dick Clark, as well as a few East Coast and Midwest DJs. By 1961, Donahue decided to move to San Francisco. He was brought there by Les Crane, former Program Director at WIBG who had been hired to "make a winner out of loser station", KYA. Crane also brought in Peter Tripp from WMGM, New York and "Bobby Mitchell" (real name: Michael Guerra Jr.), from WIBG.

== Later career ==
In 1964, while a disc jockey at Top Forty station KYA (now KOIT) in San Francisco, Donahue and Mitchell formed a record label. Autumn Records had subsequent hits with Bobby Freeman and The Mojo Men, and Sly Stone was a staff producer. But Autumn's biggest act was one that Donahue discovered, produced, recorded, and managed, The Beau Brummels, which he later sold to Warner Bros. Records. He also opened a psychedelic nightclub, Mothers, on Broadway in San Francisco, and produced concerts at the Cow Palace, the Oakland Auditorium and Candlestick Park with his partner Mitchell (later known as Bobby Tripp in Los Angeles radio). Together, they produced the last public appearance of The Beatles on August 29, 1966, at Candlestick Park.

Donahue wrote a 1967 Rolling Stone article titled "AM Radio Is Dead and Its Rotting Corpse Is Stinking Up the Airwaves", which also lambasted the Top Forty format. He subsequently took over programming for foreign-language station KMPX and changed it into what is considered to be America's first alternative "free-form" radio station. The station played album tracks chosen by the DJs on the largely ignored FM band. This one move introduced progressive radio to the U.S., and led to his becoming one of the most influential programmers of this new format. Some media critics even credited him with inventing the FM progressive, or "underground" format.

In 1969, besides his roles as a DJ, station manager, and live show producer, he also managed Leigh Stephens (former lead guitarist of the San Francisco psychedelic rock group Blue Cheer), Micky Waller (a British drummer who played in the Steampacket, Brian Auger, Julie Driscoll, Brian Auger & The Trinity, The Jeff Beck Group, 1968–69), and Pete Sears in the band Silver Metre, and in 1970 Stoneground. Donahue, and his DJ wife Raechel also took over programming of free-form radio stations KMET and KPPC-FM in Los Angeles. In 1972, he moved to the role of general manager at KSAN, where he encouraged DJs to play music from different eras and genres interspersed with interesting commentary.

A re-created example of Donahue's DJ show can be found on the album The Golden Age Of Underground Radio.

== Death ==
Donahue died from a heart attack in 1975, at the age of 46. He was inducted into the Rock and Roll Hall of Fame in 1996 as a non-performer, one of only three disc jockeys to receive that honor. In 2006, Donahue was inducted into the Bay Area Radio Hall of Fame as a member of the first class of broadcasters enshrined.

Donahue was inducted into the Rock Radio Hall of Fame in the "Legends of Rock Radio-Programming" category in 2014 for his work at KSAN and KMPX.
