= Just a Little (The Beau Brummels song) =

- French EP

Single by the Beau Brummels

from the album Introducing the Beau Brummels
- B-side: "They'll Make You Cry"
- Released: April 1965
- Recorded: 4 February & 12 March 1965
- Studio: Coast Recorders, San Francisco
- Genre: Folk rock; beat
- Length: 2:25
- Label: Autumn
- Songwriter(s): Ron Elliott, Bob Durand
- Producer(s): Sylvester "Sly Stone" Stewart

The Beau Brummels singles chronology
| "Laugh, Laugh" (1964) | "Just a Little" (1965) | "You Tell Me Why" (1965) |

"Just a Little" is a song by the American rock group the Beau Brummels. The song is included on the band's debut album, Introducing the Beau Brummels, and was released as its second single, following "Laugh, Laugh". "Just a Little" became the band's best hit parade U.S. single, which peaked at number eight on the Billboard Hot 100 in June 1965. It also reached no lower than position #10 of the hit parades in Canada and Australia.

Written by guitarist Ron Elliott with frequent collaborator Bob Durand, the song was produced by Sylvester Stewart, later known as Sly Stone. A live version of the song recorded during a 1974 concert was released on the band's 2000 Live! album. "Just a Little" has been covered by such artists as the Young Rascals, Nils Lofgren, the Smithereens, and Frank Black.

== Composition ==
Written by the band's guitarist Ron Elliott with frequent collaborator Bob Durand, "Just a Little" begins with acoustic guitar strums with ascending minor-key harmonies, while electric guitar chords are heard during the chorus. With these musical elements, "Just a Little" is considered an early example of folk rock, though it also bears a stylistic similarity to British beat.

Elliott said that the band's folk rock sound was a coincidence, not intentional. He explained, "We only had acoustic and electric guitars, so every chance we got, we'd try to add some variety. We couldn't do it much with playing or style differences, because everybody had limited chops, including myself. The only way you could get variety was to go [to] a harmonica during the song, or get an acoustic in this space, get different moods that way".

The song was produced by Sylvester Stewart, later known as Sly Stone of Sly and the Family Stone. Elliott credited Stone as having a positive influence on the band, and for "pull[ing] a lot of loose ends of the band together".

== Release and reception ==
"Just a Little" debuted at number 81 on the U.S. Billboard Hot 100 in April 1965 and peaked two months later at number eight to become the band's highest-charting single in that country. It spent nine weeks in the top 40 portion of the chart. The song peaked at number four in Canada and number ten in Australia.

A 1965 Billboard review of the single commended its "plaintive lyric and strong vocal". Record World said that the group will "be laugh, laughing all the way to the bank with the slow rocker."

In his 2000 book Urban Spacemen and Wayfaring Strangers: Overlooked Innovators and Eccentric Visionaries of '60s Rock, author Richie Unterberger noted that the song "brought the incipient folk rock of the band to maturation", adding that "with its vocal blends and mix of electric and acoustic guitars, it anticipated—barely—the official birth of folk rock, usually ascribed to the Byrds' 'Mr. Tambourine Man', which entered the charts a month after 'Just a Little'".

== Other versions ==
Alternate takes of "Just a Little" appear on the Beau Brummels' 1994 rarities album Autumn of Their Years and the 1996 three-disc box set San Fran Sessions. A live version from a 1974 concert near Sacramento, California appears on the band's 2000 Live! album. The Young Rascals recorded a cover version of the song for their 1966 eponymous debut album. The Lotus, a Hong Kong pop band with Sam Hui (許冠傑) as the lead singer, covered it on their 1967 album Just A Little/Cute Little June with the local Diamond Records. Them covered it on their 1970 eponymous album. In 1974, Sam Hui (許冠傑), former lead singer of The Lotus, re-wrote the lyrics in Chinese and recorded it in Cantonese language under the title of 等玉人, on his 鬼馬雙星 LP with Polydor Records. Hong Kong band 太極樂隊 also recorded the Cantonese version in 1992 on their album Crystal. Ruby Starr's rendition of the song appears on her 1977 album Smokey Places. Nils Lofgren released a cover version of "Just a Little" as a 1992 single, and the song also appears on his album Crooked Line, released the same year. The Smithereens included their rendition of the song on the 1995 rarities album Attack of the Smithereens. Frank Black's cover version appears on his 2000 compilation album Oddballs. Bill Popp & the Tapes performed the song on their 2008 album My Lonely Mind.

== Chart performance ==
| Chart (1965) | Peak position |
|---|---|
| Australian Singles Chart | 10 |
| Canadian Singles Chart | 4 |
| U.S. Billboard Hot 100 | 8 |
| U.S. Cash Box Top 100 Singles | 7 |
