= The Beau Brummels =

American rock band

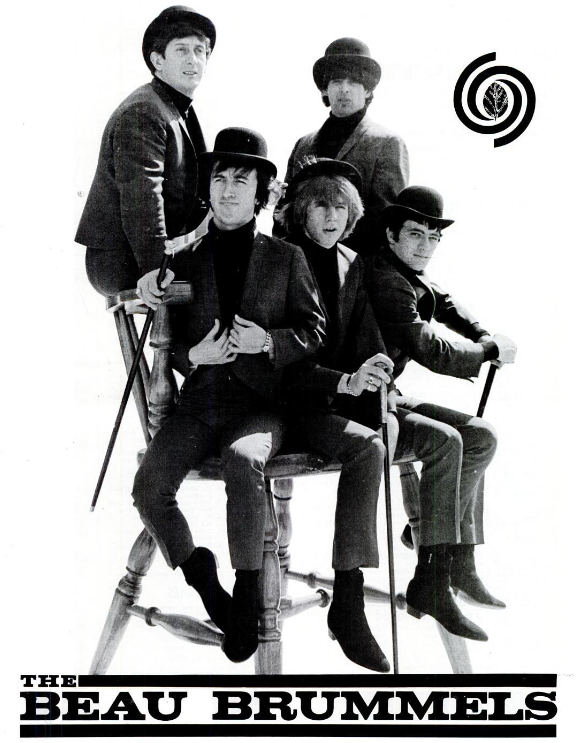
- The Beau Brummels in 1965. Top row: Declan Mulligan, Sal Valentino. Bottom row: Ron Meagher, John Peterson, Ron Elliott

Background information
- Origin: San Francisco, California, United States
- Genres: Folk rock; country rock
- Years active: 1964–1969, 1974–1975, 2000, 2002, 2013
- Labels: Autumn, Vault, Warner Bros., Bay Sound Records, Vogue Schallplatten
- Past members: Sal Valentino; Ron Elliott; Ron Meagher; Declan Mulligan; John Petersen; Don Irving

The Beau Brummels was an American rock band. Formed in San Francisco in 1964, the band's original lineup included Sal Valentino (lead vocals), Ron Elliott (lead guitar), Ron Meagher (bass guitar), Declan Mulligan (rhythm guitar, bass, harmonica), and John Petersen (drums). They were discovered by local disc jockeys who were looking to sign acts to their new label, Autumn Records, where Sylvester Stewart—later known as Sly Stone—produced the group's early recording sessions. Initially, the band's musical style blended beat music and folk music and typically drew comparisons to the Beatles, while their later work incorporated other music genres such as psychedelic rock and country rock.

The Beau Brummels broke into the mainstream with their debut single, "Laugh, Laugh", for which they would later be credited with setting one of the aesthetic foundations for the San Francisco sound, along with other bands such as the Charlatans; the song is in the Rock and Roll Hall of Fame list of the "500 Songs That Shaped Rock and Roll". The band's popularity continued with the subsequent album, 1965's Introducing The Beau Brummels, and the Top 10 single "Just a Little". The group's commercial success declined by the following year, at which time the financially struggling Autumn label was acquired by Warner Bros. Records. After recording an album of cover songs, Beau Brummels '66, the band released a pair of critically acclaimed albums: Triangle in 1967 and Bradley's Barn in 1968.

The band underwent several personnel changes, beginning with Mulligan's departure in 1965. Guitarist Don Irving joined the band in late 1965 when Elliott began to suffer seizures resulting from a diabetic condition, leaving him unable to tour with the band. Shortly after the release of Beau Brummels '66, Irving left the group when he was inducted into the armed forces. Petersen left to join Harpers Bizarre, reducing the Beau Brummels to a trio for the recording of Triangle. Meagher was drafted for military service in 1968, leaving Valentino and Elliott as the only remaining band members. The duo worked with prominent Nashville session musicians to record Bradley's Barn before parting ways in 1969 to focus on solo material and participate in projects by other artists. Four of the original Beau Brummels re-formed in 1974 with one new member, and the band released a self-titled album the following year.

== History ==
=== Formation (1964) ===
Sal Valentino grew up in the North Beach section of San Francisco. In early 1964, following a string of appearances as a singer on local television, Valentino received an offer to play a regular gig at El Cid, a San Francisco club. Needing a band, he called childhood friend and songwriter/guitarist Ron Elliott, who recruited drummer John Petersen, rhythm guitarist/singer Declan Mulligan, and bassist Ron Meagher. Victor Savant, later to achieve fame in Europe as musical director for schlager singer Roberto Blanco, was in the band for a brief period as a pianist, but never recorded with the band. The gig led to a more lucrative deal at the Morocco Room, a club in nearby San Mateo, California. Meanwhile, San Francisco disc jockeys Tom Donahue and Bobby Mitchell were looking for new acts to bring to their fledgling Autumn Records label. Donahue and Mitchell wanted to capitalize on the Beatlemania craze that originated the previous year in the UK and was spreading across the U.S. by this time. Rich Romanello, owner of the Morocco Room and the Brummels' first manager, asked Donahue and Mitchell to see the band perform at the club. Romanello recalled, "There were maybe four people in the place, and they set up and started playing, and that old hair on my arm goes up. And when the hair on your arm goes up, you got something. It was a big change, to go from saxophones and black singers to a white guitar sound, but I hired 'em." The Beau Brummels signed with Autumn, where house producer Sylvester Stewart—later known as Sly Stone, of Sly and the Family Stone fame—produced the group's early recording sessions.

The Beau Brummels took their name from the Regency-era English dandy Beau Brummell. The group liked having a British-sounding name, and the legend has been, since it so closely followed The Beatles in the alphabet, the group also knew their records would likely be placed immediately behind those of The Beatles in record-store bins. Valentino dismissed this notion in a 2008 interview with Goldmine magazine. "That's a total myth", he said. "We just needed a name, and that sounded good. We didn't even know how to spell it. Everybody now has a notion of what people were thinking back then, but we never thought of those kinds of things." Al Hazan, who produced the band's demo recording, noted, "I never thought of the Brummels in terms of the Beatles—it was Ron Elliott's talent as a songwriter that caused me to want to produce them."

=== Introducing the Beau Brummels and The Beau Brummels, Volume 2 (1965) ===
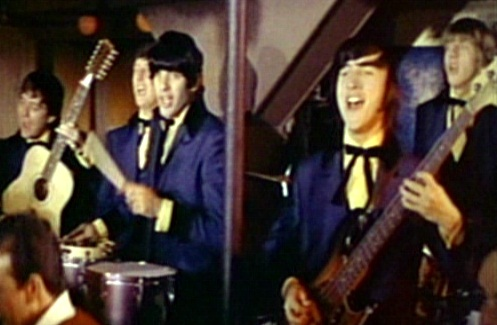
The Beau Brummels in Village of the Giants (1965). From left: Ron Elliott, Declan Mulligan, Sal Valentino, Ron Meagher, John Petersen.

"Laugh, Laugh"
A sample of "Laugh, Laugh", the debut single by the Beau Brummels, from the band's 1965 album, Introducing the Beau Brummels. This sample illustrates the song shifting from the first verse to the chorus.

The band's debut single, "Laugh, Laugh" entered the U.S. Billboard Hot 100 singles chart in January 1965, making them one of the first successful San Francisco rock band of the 1960s. As the song climbed the charts, many listeners assumed The Beau Brummels were British, due to the band's name and musical style, which recalled such bands as The Beatles and The Zombies. The comparisons were bolstered by Donahue and Mitchell, who had the band dress in Beatlesque suits and spread rumors that the band was indeed British. "Laugh, Laugh" peaked at number 15 in February, but Donahue believed the single would have gone to number one if the band was on a label with stronger distribution. The song was the band's highest-charting single in Canada, where it reached number two on the Canadian Singles Chart. The band's follow-up single, "Just a Little", became the band's highest-charting single in the U.S., peaking at number eight in June. Both songs were included on the band's debut album, Introducing the Beau Brummels, which was released in April and reached number 24 on the Billboard 200 albums chart. The band appeared as themselves and performed in the 1965 science-fiction/comedy movie Village of the Giants, (which was later featured in a 1994 episode of Mystery Science Theater 3000). The band appeared as "The Beau Brummelstones" on The Flintstones television animated sitcom in the season six episode "Shinrock A Go-Go", which originally aired on December 3, 1965.

When recording began for the band's second album, 1965's The Beau Brummels, Volume 2, Mulligan was no longer a member of the group. In 1966 Mulligan filed an unsuccessful lawsuit, claiming he was wrongfully dismissed from the group. "You Tell Me Why", the album's lead single, was the band's third and final U.S. top 40 hit, peaking at number 38 in August 1965. Another single, "Don't Talk to Strangers", reached number 52 in November. While Stone is credited as the album's producer, his involvement, according to Sal Valentino and Ron Elliott, had diminished to the point that the band does not recall any producer being in charge. By the end of the year, Elliott began to suffer seizures from his diabetic condition that left him unable to perform. Don Irving became Elliott's stand-in on guitar when the group performed live, and also recorded with them.

=== Beau Brummels '66, Triangle and Bradley's Barn (1966–68) ===
The Beau Brummels made a musical guest appearance performing "Just Wait and See" in Wild Wild Winter (actually filmed in 1965, before Village of the Giants and when Mulligan was still in the band) a beach party-inspired comedy film by Universal Pictures which was released January 5, 1966. The band continued recording new material despite Autumn verging on collapse. Such songs as "I Grow Old", "Gentle Wandering Ways" and "Dream On", along with Valentino-composed tracks such as "Love Is Just a Game", "This Is Love", and "Hey, Love", would have most likely been included on the band's third album for Autumn. But before an album was completed and released, the entire Autumn roster, including the Beau Brummels, was transferred to Warner Bros. Records. Warner Bros., however, did not control the band's publishing, and consequently the company chose not to have the band release an album of original material. The unreleased songs were later included on the 2005 three-disc compilation album San Fran Sessions. Instead, Warner Bros. opted to have the band record an album of cover songs. Released in July 1966, Beau Brummels '66 was considered a commercial and critical disappointment. The non-album single "One Too Many Mornings", a Bob Dylan cover, was the band's sixth and final Hot 100 chart entry, peaking at number 95 in June. Petersen left the band after the album's release to join Harpers Bizarre, while Irving departed when he received an induction notice into the armed forces. The three remaining members quit touring to focus on studio work.

The band resumed writing original material for their fourth album, Triangle, produced by Lenny Waronker. Session musicians, such as Van Dyke Parks, who played harpsichord on "Magic Hollow", contributed to the album. Released in July 1967, Triangle only reached number 197 on the Billboard 200 albums chart, but it was praised by critics, including Australian journalist and author Lillian Roxon in her 1969 Rock Encyclopedia. In 1968, Meagher was drafted for military service, leaving the Beau Brummels as a duo consisting of Valentino and Elliott. The duo went to Tennessee to record their fifth album, and worked with prominent Nashville session musicians such as Kenny Buttrey, a drummer on Bob Dylan's albums from 1966 to 1969, and guitarist Jerry Reed. The Beau Brummels were so pleased with the results at the studio that they named the album Bradley's Barn, after the studio in which it was recorded. Shortly following the album's release in October 1968, the Beau Brummels split up.

=== Solo works, other projects and reformation (1969–2013) ===
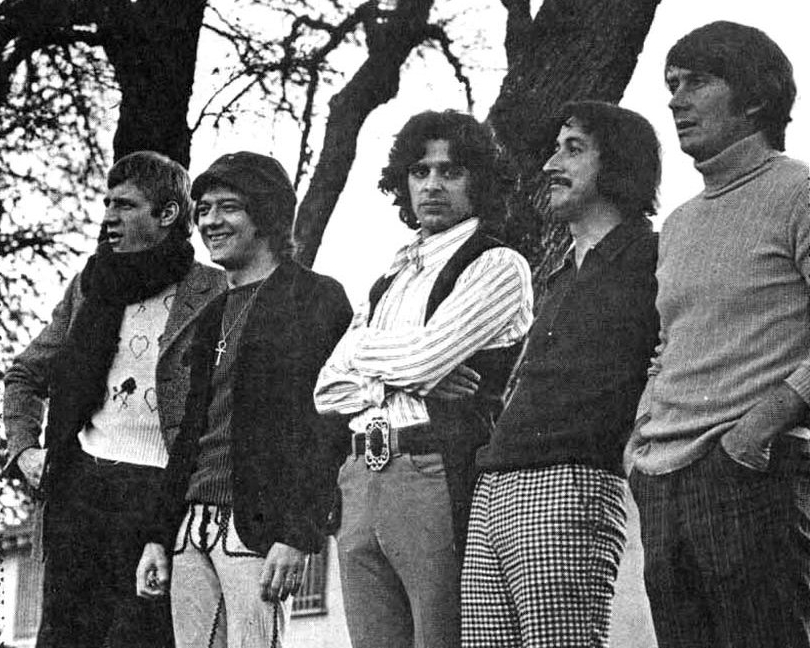
The Beau Brummels, reformed in 1974

Following a stint in 1969 recording solo singles for Warner Bros. Records, Valentino assembled a new band, Stoneground, which was associated with the hippie commune the Hog Farm in the early 1970s. The band broke up in 1973 after releasing three albums. Elliott, who in 1968 played guitar on Van Dyke Parks' debut album, Song Cycle, and arranged The Everly Brothers' album, Roots, released a solo album, The Candlestickmaker, in 1970. During the early 1970s, Elliott produced albums by Levitt & McClure and Pan, and played on albums by Van Morrison, Randy Newman and Little Feat. Meanwhile, Mulligan and Meagher were members of the Black Velvet Band. In 1969, Petersen married Roberta Templeman, sister of Harpers Bizarre's Ted Templeman. Petersen remained with Harper's Bizarre until the band broke up in the early 1970s.

In February 1974, Billboard magazine reported that the Beau Brummels had reformed in San Francisco. The band resumed touring, and a 1974 performance recorded in Fair Oaks Village near Sacramento, California was released in 2000 as the Live! album. In April 1975, the band released a self-titled studio album, which reached number 180 on the Billboard 200 albums chart. One of the band's previous singles, 1965's "You Tell Me Why", was re-recorded for the album.

Although the band split up again soon after the album's release, the Beau Brummels continued to work in various incarnations from the late 1970s through the mid-1990s, including shows with The Smithereens, and often appeared in tandem with Dinosaurs, the psychedelic-era "supergroup". The band also performed at shows such as the Baypop 2000 Festival and the 2002 Summer of Love Festival, both in San Francisco. In 2006, Valentino released Dreamin' Man, the first solo album of his 50-year career. Another album, Come Out Tonight, followed later that year, and his third solo album, Every Now and Then, was released in 2008. John Petersen died of a heart attack on November 11, 2007.

The remaining original band members reunited to record a studio album, Continuum, released in March 2013 on Bay Sound Records. The album features drum tracks that were recorded in 1965 by Petersen and contains 15 songs written by Elliott, along with re-recordings of "Just a Little", "Don't Talk to Strangers", and "Laugh, Laugh".

== Musical style ==
"Magic Hollow"
A sample of "Magic Hollow", from the band's 1967 album, Triangle. The song, which features Van Dyke Parks on harpsichord, illustrates the band's psychedelic pop sound.

Combining beat music and folk rock, the Beau Brummels were most often compared, especially early in their career, to British bands such as the Beatles and the Zombies. The Beau Brummels were fans of these acts as well as The Rolling Stones and The Searchers, and originally patterned their overall style after the British Invasion sound. The melancholy, minor keys of debut single "Laugh, Laugh" led many listeners mistakenly to believe that the band were indeed British. As the band evolved, they incorporated different music genres into their works, ranging from hard rock to country and western to rhythm and blues. The Triangle album exhibited the band's growing interest in country music along with elements of psychedelic pop, including the use of strings, brass, woodwinds, harpsichord, and various types of unique percussion. Ron Elliott said the album was "sort of a mood swing into the world that was around us at the time. It was sort of dissolving into this drug culture. So the music became very ethereal, mystic, and mysterious." The band's country rock fusion was most evident on their 1968 album Bradley's Barn, which Elliott said was similar stylistically to Triangle, but with more country accents.

The band members have been hesitant to categorize their music, preferring to call it a combination of styles, according to Elliott. "We don't play anything really different—we play melodically and rhythmically", he said in a 1965 interview. "I think that's why the [Rolling] Stones have made it. They don't do anything really fantastic but they have good taste, and good taste is more important than speed." Sal Valentino praised Elliott's vocal style, saying that "Ron had a great low register. He knew how to write in the best keys for me." Valentino added, "From the time I started singing in bands, I didn't really sing too many other people's songs other than Ron's. Being able to sing just one person's writing, who was a pretty able writer with ability to adjust to what he's working with, had a lot to do with the way I sang." Valentino also credited Sly Stone's input for the band's early success. "He had a lot to do with making our music relatable and anticipating how our records would sound on the radio, particularly on the bottom, rhythm end. Sly was very motivated to make a lot of money, and he was awfully talented."

== Legacy ==
Clockwise from top right: John Petersen, Sal Valentino, Ron Meagher, Ron Elliott, and Declan Mulligan perform as the Beau Brummelstones in a 1965 episode of The Flintstones

The Beau Brummels are considered one of the first bands from a burgeoning San Francisco music scene. At the height of the band's popularity, the Beau Brummels were regarded as teen idols, appearing on several television music variety shows including American Bandstand, Shindig!, and Hullabaloo, as well as the teen films Village of the Giants and Wild Wild Winter. The band also appeared as the Beau Brummelstones in a 1965 episode of the animated television sitcom The Flintstones. The group's Triangle (1967) and Bradley's Barn (1968) albums are considered two examples in the country rock music genre.

"Laugh, Laugh" was included on the 1998 reissue of Nuggets: Original Artyfacts from the First Psychedelic Era, 1965–1968, a compilation double album of American garage rock singles that helped influence the development of 1970s punk rock. The song was also featured during a scene in the 1989 comedy-drama film Uncle Buck, starring John Candy. In 1994, "Laugh, Laugh" was named to the Rock and Roll Hall of Fame's exhibit showcasing The 500 Songs that Shaped Rock and Roll". In the June 1997 issue of Mojo magazine, "Magic Hollow" was selected as one of the "100 Greatest Psychedelic Classics". Music journalist and author Tom Moon named Triangle to his 2008 book of the 1,001 Recordings to Hear Before You Die.

== Band members ==
=== Original line-up ===
- Sal Valentino – lead vocals, tambourine (1964–1969, 1974–1975)
- Ron Elliott – lead guitar, backing vocals, occasional lead (1964–1969, 1974–1975)
- Ron Meagher – bass, backing vocals, occasional lead (1964–1967, 1974)
- Declan Mulligan – rhythm guitar, harmonica, backing vocals, occasional lead (1964–1965, 1974–1975; died 2021)
- John Petersen – drums, occasional lead vocal (1964–1966, 1974–1975; died 2007)

=== Subsequent members ===
- Don Irving – guitars, backing vocals (1965–1966)
- Dan Levitt – banjo, guitars (1974–1975)
- Peter Tepp – drums (completed 1975 tour)

=== Timeline ===
- Note: The Beau Brummels were inactive during the 1969–1974 period.

== Discography ==
- 1965: Introducing the Beau Brummels
- 1965: The Beau Brummels, Volume 2
- 1966: Beau Brummels '66
- 1967: Triangle
- 1968: Bradley's Barn
- 1975: The Beau Brummels
- 2013: Continuum

== See also ==
- List of bands from the San Francisco Bay Area
