= Village of the Giants =

1965 film by Bert I. Gordon

- Theatrical release poster
- Directed by: Bert I. Gordon
- Screenplay by: Bert I. Gordon; Alan Caillou
- Based on: The Food of the Gods and How It Came to Earth by H. G. Wells
- Produced by: Bert I. Gordon
- Starring: Tommy Kirk; Johnny Crawford; Ronny Howard; The Beau Brummels; Freddy Cannon; Mike Clifford
- Cinematography: Paul C. Vogel
- Edited by: John A. Bushelman
- Music by: Jack Nitzsche; The Beau Brummels
- Production company: Berkeley Productions
- Distributed by: Embassy Pictures
- Release date: October 20, 1965
- Running time: 81 minutes
- Country: United States
- Language: English
- Budget: $750,000

Village of the Giants is a 1965 American teensploitation comedy science fiction film produced, directed and written by Bert I. Gordon. Based loosely on H. G. Wells's 1904 book The Food of the Gods and How It Came to Earth, it contains elements of the beach party film genre. The story concerns a gang of rebellious teens who gain access to a chemical substance called "Goo", which causes living things to grow to gigantic proportions. The cast is composed almost entirely of teenaged actors and young adults portraying teenagers. Also making musical guest appearances are The Beau Brummels, Freddy Cannon, and Mike Clifford. Gordon would later direct another adaptation of Wells' story, titled The Food of the Gods.

== Plot ==
Village of the Giants takes place in fictional Hainesville, California. After crashing their car into a roadblock during a rainstorm, a group of partying, big-city teenagers (Fred, Pete, Rick, Harry, and their girlfriends Merrie, Elsa, Georgette and Jean) first indulge in a vigorous, playful mud-wrestling fight, then hike their way into town. Fred remembers meeting a girl from Hainesville named Nancy, and they decide to look her up.

Nancy, meanwhile, is with her boyfriend Mike, while her younger brother "Genius" plays with his chemistry set in the basement. Genius accidentally creates a substance he names "Goo", that, when consumed, causes animals, including a dog and a pair of ducks, to grow to gigantic size.

The out-of-town teens break into the local theater and clean up from the rain, then go to a nearby club where The Beau Brummels are performing. Shortly, the giant ducks turn up, followed by Mike and Nancy. Everyone is astounded by the size of the ducks, wondering how they got so big. Mike explains that it's a secret, but following a suggestion made by their friends Horsey and Red, they host a picnic in the town square the next day, roasting the ducks and feeding everybody. Freddy Cannon is featured singing a song in this scene.

Fred and his friends also see potential in whatever made the ducks grow, but their minds are purely on profit. They scheme to learn the secret, and are ultimately successful, escaping with a sample. Back at the theater, the gang argues over what to do with the Goo, now that they have it. Feeling peer pressure, Fred slices up the Goo, giving everyone a piece each, which they consume a moment later. As the Goo takes effect, they each grow to over thirty feet (9.1 m) tall, ripping right out of their clothes. At first everyone is shocked and regretful, but realizing their newfound power at their new size, the gang decide to take over the town.

Overnight, the giants decide to isolate Hainesville from the rest of the world. They rip out the telephone lines, overturn broadcasting antennas, and block the remaining roads out of town. When the sheriff and Mike arrive to deal with them, they discover that the giants have no plans to leave – and are literally holding the sheriff's daughter Cora, as "insurance" that they won't have any trouble. While the town's adults seem paralyzed, the teens decide to fight back. An attempt to capture Fred results in Nancy being taken hostage.

Meanwhile, Genius continues to work, trying to produce more Goo. Mike asks Genius to forget the Goo for a while and make them a supply of ether – having noticed the giants only leave Merrie as guard on the hostages. Mike and Horsey plot to subdue Merrie, recover the guns, and free Nancy and the sheriff's daughter.

Having led the giants outside the theater, Mike plays David to Fred's Goliath, to distract them while Horsey and the others effect the rescue. Genius' newest attempt at Goo results in an antidote. He rides over to the square on a bicycle with a pail full of the fuming antidote. As the giants breathe in the fumes, they all return to normal. Mike cold-cocks the surprised Fred, and promptly runs him and his friends, looking silly in their now-oversized clothes, out of town.

However, as Fred and the others reach their car, they meet a travelling band of little people who have heard about the "goo" and its effects, and are heading into the town to investigate the substance.

== Cast ==
- Tommy Kirk as Mike
- Johnny Crawford as "Horsey"
- Beau Bridges as Fred
- Ron Howard as "Genius"
- Joy Harmon as Merrie
- Bob Random as Rick
- Tisha Sterling as Jean
- Charla Doherty as Nancy
- Tim Rooney as Pete
- Kevin O'Neal as Harry
- Gail Gilmore as Elsa
- Toni Basil as "Red"
- Hank Jones as Chuck
- Jim Begg as "Fatso"
- Vicki London as Georgette
- Joe Turkel as Sheriff
- The Beau Brummels as Themselves
- Freddy Cannon as Sin
- Mike Clifford as himself
- Debi Storm as Cora
- Rance Howard as Deputy
- Higgins as Wolf
- Orangey as Giant Cat
- Julie Kenney as Basement Girl

== Music ==
The film's instrumental theme song, by composer and arranger Jack Nitzsche, was originally released as "The Last Race" on Reprise Records, months before the movie appeared, and which would later be used as the main title music for Death Proof, Quentin Tarantino's portion of the film Grindhouse, in 2007.

The Beau Brummels, singers Freddy Cannon and Mike Clifford all make appearances. Cannon enjoyed a string of hits during the 1960s, including "Palisades Park" and "Tallahassee Lassie", and performs "Little Bitty Corrine" in his signature style (wearing a cardigan sweater in the summertime), while Mike Clifford (veteran of The Ed Sullivan Show, and later an actor) croons the movie's obligatory slow song, "Marianne". Clifford is also credited with another song, "Nothing Can Stand in My Way", but this does not appear in the film. There was no official soundtrack release for this movie.

== Production notes ==
=== Director ===
The film's director, Bert I. Gordon, was involved with many size-themed movies in his career (perhaps coincidentally, his initials are "BIG"). Besides Village, these include King Dinosaur (1955), Beginning of the End (1957), The Cyclops (1957), The Amazing Colossal Man (1957), Attack of the Puppet People (1958), War of the Colossal Beast (1958), Earth vs. the Spider (1958), and The Food of the Gods (1976).

The film was made by Gordon's newly formed Berkeley Productions. It was to be the first of a three-year 12-picture deal between Berkeley and Joseph E. Levine's Embassy Productions. Some of these were to be for TV, others for theaters. The next two planned films were titled The Creatures of Dr. Freak and Horror House, but neither of these was made.

=== Casting ===
The cast features a number of children of established Hollywood actors: Beau Bridges (son of Lloyd Bridges), Ron Howard (son of Rance Howard), Tisha Sterling (daughter of Robert Sterling and Ann Sothern), Toni Basil (daughter of Louis Basil) and Tim Rooney (son of Mickey Rooney). Debi Storm completed her role as Cora, the sheriff (Joe Turkel)'s daughter in just three days. Vicki London, who played Georgette, is absent from the screen for most of the giant scenes in the film. Robert Random and Joy Harmon each also appeared in episodes of Gidget, which debuted in the fall of 1965.

The cat appearing in this film was named Orangey (later renamed Minerva), and Village of the Giants was the second time he played the role of a cat larger than a human, the first being Scott Carey's (Grant Williams) pet in The Incredible Shrinking Man (1957). His most famous roles were as Rhubarb in the film Rhubarb (1951) and Cat in Breakfast at Tiffany's (1961).

Tommy Kirk made the film after his arrest for drug possession. He later said he wasn't "too embarrassed" about the film. "It's kind of a crazy movie but the production values are pretty good and it sort of holds together. I could have done without the dancing ducks, though."

Beau Bridges has one of his earliest roles as Fred, the unofficial leader of the teenagers who turn into giants. He later recalled:

When I did it, I was about 18 or 19, and I took it all quite seriously. I thought it was my chance to really be a spokesperson for my generation, you know? I had that long speech when I'm in the theater, and I've eaten this goo ... I address the police chief of the town about the young people, the teenagers, that he says are losing control, and I speak out about freedom and everything. I took it so seriously, and I think I even rewrote my lines. Now, though, it's, uh, a little embarrassing.

=== Original script ===
Alan Caillou's original script called for the sheriff's deputy (played by Rance Howard) to be stepped on by the giants. If the scene was ever filmed, it did not make the final edit, and no known footage of it exists.

=== Locations and props ===
Most of the outdoor scenes were filmed on the Columbia Pictures backlot, where portions of I Dream of Jeannie and The Partridge Family were also made. The lot is now owned by Warner Brothers. The scene where the giants convene outside the Hainesville theater was shot at the Courthouse Square lot at Universal Studios, where Back to the Future and Gremlins were later made.

The film's goo was a simple mixture of angel food cake mix with pink-colored dye. The beer the teenagers are drinking at the beginning of the film is Blatz, and the Teen magazine Merrie (Joy Harmon) reads in the film is an actual issue, from the summer of 1965. The tiny yellow custom hot rod (with the surfboard) that is used in the street scene to tie up Fred's feet is The Surfite, designed by Ed "Big Daddy" Roth.

== Release, reception and legacy ==
The low-budget film had limited commercial success at the time of its release, for it was distributed mainly to drive-in theaters as part of double features. In 1965 it did draw media attraction and audiences with some of its special effects and lightly provocative sex appeal, including scenes with implied nudity. Margaret Hartford of the Los Angeles Times, for example, alludes to those elements in her review at the time. The "best things" about the film, she writes, are the "special effects and photographic trickery", along with "those endless views of healthy young torsos gyrating to the rhythms of the Beau Brummells or Freddy Cannon". Hartford adds, "Alan Caillou's script keeps the action fast and the dancing swinging."

=== Mystery Science Theater 3000 ===
On January 11, 1994, an episode of Mystery Science Theater 3000 (episode 523) featuring Village of the Giants premiered on Comedy Central. The episode was dedicated in memoriam to the recently deceased Frank Zappa and featured "Let Me Be Frank about Frank", an original song ostensibly about TV's Frank (Frank Conniff), the sidekick to the show's mad scientist, Dr. Clayton Forrester (Trace Beaulieu). TV's Frank was fired during the episode, replaced with recurring character Torgo from Manos: The Hands of Fate (Michael J. Nelson), and rehired after he convinced Torgo to do something awful to Dr. Forrester off-camera.

Writer Jim Vorel has a much more positive evaluation of the episode, rating Village of the Giants #35 (out of 191 total MST3K episodes). "It's a supremely cheesy, very watchable slice of '60s teen culture, crossed with some very light science fiction", said Vorel.

The MST3K version of Village of the Giants was included as part of the Mystery Science Theater 3000, Volume 27 DVD collection, released by Shout! Factory on July 23, 2013. The other episodes in the four-disc set include The Slime People (episode #108), Rocket Attack U.S.A. (episode #205), and The Deadly Mantis (episode #804).
