= Ron Elliott (musician) =

American guitarist, composer and producer (born 1943)

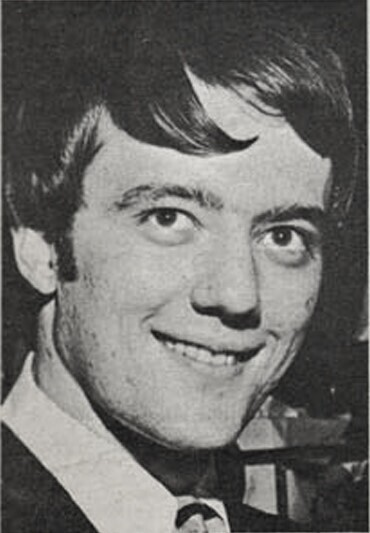
- Elliott in February 5, 1966 issue of KRLA Beat

Background information
- Born: Ronald Charles Elliott; October 21, 1943 (age 82)
- Origin: Healdsburg, California, U.S.
- Genres: Folk rock, pop rock, garage rock, country rock
- Occupations: Musician, composer, producer
- Instruments: Guitar, vocals
- Years active: 1964–2002
- Formerly of: The Beau Brummels

Ronald Charles Elliott (born October 21, 1943) is an American musician, composer and record producer, best known as songwriter and lead guitarist of the rock band The Beau Brummels. Elliott wrote or co-wrote the band's 1965 U.S. top 20 hits "Laugh, Laugh" and "Just a Little". In addition to reuniting with the Beau Brummels on occasion over the years, Elliott released a solo album in 1970, and has played on and produced albums by a number of other artists.

== History ==
During childhood, Elliott developed juvenile diabetes, which had near-catastrophic consequences when he was twelve years old. Growing up, Elliott wrote music influenced by composers George Gershwin and Jerome Kern, as well as country music artist Lefty Frizzell, In 1964, childhood friend Sal Valentino called to inform Elliott that he had a gig but had no band to back him up. Elliott agreed to help him put a band together, which included himself on lead guitar, Ron Meagher on bass, Declan Mulligan on rhythm guitar and John Petersen on drums. The group, known as the Beau Brummels, began playing in and around San Francisco, and was signed to Autumn Records by local deejay Tom Donahue.

The band had two immediate hits in early 1965 with "Laugh, Laugh" and "Just a Little" both reaching the U.S. top 20. Elliott appeared with the band in the 1965 science-fiction/comedy movie Village of the Giants, which was featured in a 1994 episode of Mystery Science Theater 3000. Elliott also appeared with the band as The Beau Brummelstones on The Flintstones television animated sitcom in the season six episode "Shinrock A Go-Go," which originally aired on December 3, 1965. Touring became complicated on a couple of occasions when Elliott suffered seizures from his diabetic condition that left him unable to perform. In 1966, Warner Bros. Records acquired Autumn and promptly put out an all-covers album, Beau Brummels '66, which distressed Elliott as the band's main songwriter. He moved to Los Angeles to attempt to regain control over the musical direction, while the rest of the band remained in San Francisco. For a brief time, Don Irving became Elliott's stand-in on guitar when the group performed. Elliott, with Valentino co-writing, created two critically acclaimed albums, 1967's Triangle and 1968's Bradley's Barn. By this time the Beau Brummels were reduced to a duo consisting of Elliott and Valentino, and they soon split.

Elliott arranged The Everly Brothers' 1968 album Roots, on which he also played. The Everly Brothers recorded two of his songs, "Turn Around", which had appeared on Bradley's Barn, and "Ventura Boulevard". Elliott played guitar on Van Dyke Parks' debut album, 1967's Song Cycle, and released a solo album of his own, The Candlestickmaker, in 1970. He reunited with the Beau Brummels on occasion, most notably in the mid-1970s when the group released a 1975 self-titled album. Elliott went on to work with artists such as Randy Newman, Van Morrison, Little Feat and Dolly Parton.

== Discography ==
=== With The Beau Brummels ===
- Introducing the Beau Brummels (1965)
- The Beau Brummels, Vol. 2 (1965)
- Beau Brummels '66 (1966)
- Triangle (1967)
- Bradley's Barn (1968)
- The Beau Brummels (1975)

=== Solo ===
- The Candlestickmaker (1970)
