= Sal Valentino =

American rock musician, singer and songwriter (born 1942)

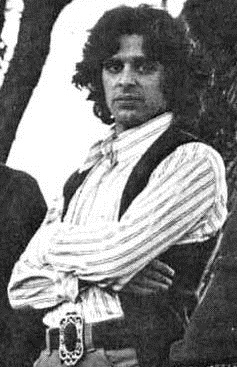
- Sal Valentino in 1974

Background information
- Born: Salvatore Willard Spampinato; September 8, 1942 (age 83); San Francisco, California, U.S.
- Genres: Folk rock, pop rock, garage rock, blues-rock
- Occupations: Singer, songwriter
- Years active: 1961–present
- Formerly of: The Beau Brummels, Stoneground

Sal Valentino (born Salvatore Willard Spampinato; September 8, 1942) is an American rock musician, singer and songwriter, best known as lead singer of The Beau Brummels, subsequently becoming a songwriter as well. The band released a pair of top 20 U.S. hit singles in 1965, "Laugh, Laugh" and "Just a Little". He later fronted another band, Stoneground, which produced three albums in the early 1970s. After reuniting on numerous occasions with the Beau Brummels, Valentino began a solo career, releasing his latest album, Every Now and Then, in 2008.

== Early life ==
Valentino grew up in the North Beach section of San Francisco.

== Career ==
=== The Beau Brummels ===
In 1964, he received an offer to play a regular gig at a local club. Needing a band, he called childhood friend and songwriter/guitarist Ron Elliott, who recruited drummer John Petersen, rhythm guitarist/singer Declan Mulligan, and bassist Ron Meagher. They called themselves "The Stepping Stones", and played the Longshoreman's Hall in S.F., which led to a more lucrative deal at the Morocco Room, a club in nearby San Mateo, California. There, the Beau Brummels were discovered by prominent San Francisco DJ Tom Donahue, who quickly signed the band to his label, Autumn Records. The band released "Laugh, Laugh" in December 1964 as their debut single. The song peaked at number fifteen in February 1965. "Just a Little", the follow-up single, fared even better on the charts, peaking at number eight. Valentino appeared with the band in the 1965 science-fiction/comedy movie Village of the Giants, which was featured in a 1994 episode of Mystery Science Theater 3000. Valentino also appeared with the band as The Beau Brummelstones on the animated TV sitcom The Flintstones in the season six episode "Shinrock A Go-Go," which originally aired on December 3, 1965.

Although the Beau Brummels' subsequent releases were not as commercially successful as their debut album and its first two singles, the band earned underground credibility with 1967's Triangle and 1968's Bradley's Barn. Critics noted the works as early contributions to the country rock genre. The band, which by 1968 consisted of only Valentino and Elliott, split up.

He later participated in numerous Beau Brummels revivals over the next two decades.

=== Stoneground ===
Following a stint recording singles for Warner Bros. Records, Valentino assembled a new band, Stoneground. After the group released three albums in the early 1970s, Valentino left the group in 1973.

== Later career ==
After a hiatus from music, Valentino contributed to a 2003 Bob Dylan tribute album, Positively 12th and K, with musician Jackie Greene. In 2006, Valentino released Dreamin' Man, the first solo album of his 45-year career.

Another album, Come Out Tonight, followed later that year, and his third solo album, Every Now and Then, was released in 2008.

== Personal life ==
Disenchanted, he left the music business. For many years, he worked non-musical jobs, including forklift driver and warehouse stockman, finally ending up working as an agent in the Race Form at Northern California race tracks. In 1993, he herniated his back and was forced to go on disability. This was the first time in 15 years he thought of returning to music and singing again.

== Discography ==
=== With Stoneground ===
- Stoneground (1971)
- Family Album (1971)
- Stoneground 3 (1972)

=== Solo albums ===
- Dreamin' Man (2006)
- Come Out Tonight (2006)
- Every Now and Then (2008)

=== Collaborations ===
- Positively 12th and K: A Bob Dylan Tribute (by Jackie Greene/Sal Valentino & Friends) (2003)
