= Autumn Records =

American pop music record label

- Founded: 1960s
- Country of origin: United States
- Location: San Francisco

Autumn Records was an American 1960s San Francisco–based pop record label. Among the notable acts on its roster was The Beau Brummels, a band who released a pair of top 20 singles, "Laugh, Laugh" and "Just a Little".

Also on the Autumn Records roster was The Great Society, a short-lived Haight-Ashbury group that recorded the first version of "Somebody to Love" on Autumn's short-lived North Beach label, which became a 1967 hit for Jefferson Airplane.

The label dissolved in 1966. Tom Donahue and Michael Guerra AKA Bobby Mitchel, San Francisco DJ's who worked for KYA radio, owned the record label. Donahue went on to invent the "underground radio" genre on stations KMPX and later KSAN.

== History ==
Rock producer/DJ Sly Stone was a producer for the label, producing Bobby Freeman's "C'mon and Swim"/"Do The Swim," a hit on the national and regional charts in 1964. Freeman had had some hits on Jubilee in 1958 to 1960 and on King in the early 1960s, but became the first artist on Autumn to have any big-selling hits. Stone produced the Psyrcle's 45 on Lorna, which did not sell well regionally or nationally. The Psyrcle took a hiatus, rehearsed and regrouped before becoming The Rockets (later Crazy Horse, Neil Young's backing band), a band with eight members.

After Freeman, Autumn's next signing and biggest success was with The Beau Brummels, who had two big hits, "Laugh, Laugh" and "Just a Little". Autumn also had two subsidiary labels. The Great Society recorded for its North Beach label. An early version of "Somebody to Love" (as "Someone to Love") appeared on this label as the "B" side to "Free Advice". The Psyrcle (actually The Rockets) recorded "Don't Leave Me" for its subsidiary label Lorna Records.

Stone produced a 45 by The Great Society—then known as The! Great!! Society!!!—for Autumn's subsidiary North Beach. Members included Grace Slick's then-husband Jerry and his brother Darby, author of "White Rabbit", but felt they had no talent because it took 45 takes for them to "get it right." There is a 45 by a group called The Tikis (later renamed Harpers Bizarre) which cut a 45 entitled "Bye, Bye, Bye" on Autumn. This song was later featured on their 1969 W.B. album Harper's Bizarre #4. Warner Bros. Records bought out Autumn Records' assets in 1966. Many of the groups became Warner-Reprise recording artists. These included such minor Autumn artists as The Mojo Men and The Vejtables. In 1965, Autumn Records released the single sung by later Manson family member Catherine Share aka "Gypsy", recorded and released under the name of "Charity Shayne" - produced and written by Marty Cooper.

Stone cut one solo 45 before he became famous with The Family Stone, but it had little chart impact. The Beau Brummels continued recording for Warner Bros. but were less commercially successful than they had been for Autumn.

The Grateful Dead (then known as The Emergency Crew) were almost signed to Autumn in 1966, but the label was running out of money, so their 45 was issued by Scorpio, a Fantasy Records subsidiary.

The Charlatans, another San Francisco area 1960s-era psychedelic group which had Dan Hicks as a member, was also almost signed. The problem was that the label was headed toward bankruptcy and did not have the necessary money on hand to sign either band.

Autumn was probably one of the most successful independent record labels in the mid-1960s, but changes in the record-buying public's tastes and major marketing by already established bigger labels (nearly every major record company signed a heavy psychedelic band in the late 1960s) led to the demise of Autumn in 1966. Most of the recording contracts were sold to Warner Bros. Records and the catalog was sold to Vault Records. The owner of Vault was later a partner of JAS Records, which reissued the Autumn catalog.

=== Staff ===
- Tom Donahue – (head of label, president, producer)
- Bobby Mitchell – (head of label, president, producer)
- Sylvester Stewart – (principal producer)
- Leo De Gar Kulka aka "The Baron" – (engineer)

== See also ==
- List of record labels
