= Love Is the Song We Sing: San Francisco Nuggets 1965–1970 =

2007 record box set by various artists

Box set by Various Artists
- Released: September 18, 2007
- Recorded: 1964–1970
- Genres: Psychedelic rock, garage rock, folk-rock
- Length: 257:11
- Label: Rhino
- Producer: Alec Palao

Nuggets series chronology
Children of Nuggets: Original Artyfacts from the Second Psychedelic Era, 1976–1995 (2005)	Love Is the Song We Sing: San Francisco Nuggets 1965–1970 (2007)	Where the Action Is! Los Angeles Nuggets: 1965–1968 (2009)

Professional ratings
Review scores
Source	Rating
Allmusic	4.5/5 stars

Love Is the Song We Sing: San Francisco Nuggets 1965–1970 is the fourth Nuggets box set released by Rhino Records. It was released in 2007 and packaged as an 8 1/2 × 11" 120 page hardcover book, the first 73 pages of which were made up mostly of vintage photographs. The compilation focuses on San Francisco Sound bands. Its title is derived from the first line of "Get Together," two versions of which open (Dino Valenti) and close (The Youngbloods) the four-disc set. The album was nominated for a 2008 Grammy Award in the Best Historical Album category.

== Track listing ==
=== Disc one: "Seismic Rumbles" ===
1. "Let's Get Together" - Dino Valenti – 3:00
2. "I Feel Like I'm Fixin' to Die Rag" – Country Joe & The Fish – 2:43
3. "You Were on My Mind" - We Five – 2:36
4. "Number One" - The Charlatans – 4:06
5. "Can't Come Down" - The Warlocks – 3:01
6. "Don't Talk to Strangers" - The Beau Brummels – 2:20
7. "Anything" - The Vejtables – 1:58
8. "It's No Secret" - Jefferson Airplane – 2:30
9. "Johnny Was a Good Boy" - The Mystery Trend – 2:37
10. "Free Advice" - The Great Society – 2:06
11. "Mr. Jones (Ballad of a Thin Man)" - The Grass Roots – 2:55
12. "Stranger in a Strange Land" - Blackburn & Snow – 2:30
13. "Who Do You Love?" - Quicksilver Messenger Service – 5:56
14. "She's My Baby" - The Mojo Men – 3:01
15. "Coffee Cup" - The Wildflower – 2:18
16. "Live Your Own Life" - The Family Tree – 2:54
17. "Fat City" - Sons of Champlin – 3:04
18. "Human Monkey" - Frantics – 2:09
19. "Bye Bye Bye" - The Tikis – 2:46
20. "Section 43" - Country Joe & the Fish – 6:44
21. "Hello Hello" - Sopwith Camel – 2:25

=== Disc two: "Suburbia" ===
1. "Psychotic Reaction" - Count Five
2. "Got Love" - The Front Line
3. "Satisfaction Guaranteed" - The Mourning Reign
4. "Foolish Woman" - The Oxford Circle
5. "My Buddy Sin" - The Stained Glass
6. "Streetcar" - The Other Side
7. "Suzy Creamcheese" - Teddy and His Patches
8. "Rubiyat" - The Immediate Family
9. "Rumors" - Syndicate of Sound
10. "Sometimes I Wonder" - Harbinger Complex
11. "Want Ad Reader" - The New Breed
12. "I'm a Good Woman" - The Generation
13. "No Way Out" - The Chocolate Watch Band
14. "Hey I'm Lost" - Butch Engle & the Styx
15. "I Love You" - People!
16. "America" - Public Nuisance
17. "Fly To New York" - Country Weather
18. "Thing In 'E'" - The Savage Resurrection
19. "Hearts to Cry" - Frumious Bandersnatch

=== Disc three: "Summer of Love" ===
1. "Alabama Bound" - The Charlatans
2. "Carl Street" - The Mystery Trend
3. "Somebody to Love" - The Great Society
4. "Superbird" - Country Joe and the Fish
5. "Two Days 'Til Tomorrow" - The Beau Brummels
6. "Omaha" - Moby Grape
7. "Up & Down" - The Serpent Power
8. "The Golden Road (To Unlimited Devotion)" - Grateful Dead
9. "Codine" - Quicksilver Messenger Service
10. "Down On Me" - Big Brother and the Holding Company
11. "Think Twice" - Salvation
12. "White Rabbit" - Jefferson Airplane
13. "Roll With It" - Steve Miller Band
14. "Why Did You Put Me On" - Notes From The Underground
15. "Underdog" - Sly & The Family Stone
16. "Summertime Blues" - Blue Cheer
17. "Glue" - The Ace of Cups
18. "Soul Sacrifice" - Santana
19. "The Bells" - The Loading Zone

=== Disc four: "The Man Can't Bust Our Music" ===
1. "Evil Ways" - Santana
2. "Red the Sign Post" - Fifty Foot Hose
3. "Lemonaide Kid" - Kak
4. "1982-A" - Sons of Champlin
5. "How Can I Miss You When You Won't Go Away?" - Dan Hicks & His Hot Licks
6. "Amphetamine Gazelle" - Mad River
7. "Quicksilver Girl" - Steve Miller Band
8. "Revolution" - Mother Earth
9. "Murder in My Heart for the Judge" - Moby Grape
10. "Light Your Windows" - Quicksilver Messenger Service
11. "I'm Drowning" - Flamin' Groovies
12. "Portrait of the Artist as a Young Lady" - Seatrain
13. "White Bird" - It's a Beautiful Day
14. "Dark Star" - Grateful Dead
15. "Fool" - Blue Cheer
16. "Mexico" - Jefferson Airplane
17. "Mercedes Benz" - Janis Joplin
18. "Get Together" - The Youngbloods

== Credits ==
- Compilation Producer: Alec Palao
- Art Direction: Hugh Brown, Steve Vance
- Design: Steve Vance
- Cover Design: Prairie Prince
- Licensing: David Ponak
- Liner Notes: Alec Palao, Ben Fong-Torres, Gene Sculatti
- Photography: Ann Ehret, Ann Markell, Bruce Steinberg, Don Leeper, Ed Thrasher, Ethan Russell, Herb Greene, Jim Marshall, Lisa Law, *Michael Rachoff, Michael Howard, Paul Kagan, Yoram Kahana
- Product Manager: Marc Salata
- Remastering: Bill Inglot, Dan Hersch, Dave Schultz
- Editorial Supervision: Sheryl Farber, Vanessa Atkins

== See also ==
- Nuggets (series)
- Hallucinations: Psychedelic Pop Nuggets from the WEA Vaults
- Come to the Sunshine: Soft Pop Nuggets from the WEA Vaults
- Where the Action Is! Los Angeles Nuggets 1965–1968
