= San Francisco sound =

San Francisco music genre (mid-1960s – early 1970s)

- Stylistic origins: Rock; psychedelia
- Cultural origins: Mid-1960s, San Francisco, California, U.S.

Other topics
- Acid rock; California sound; Haight-Ashbury; psychedelic rock

The San Francisco sound is rock music performed live and recorded by San Francisco–based rock groups of the mid-1960s to early 1970s. It was associated with the counterculture community in San Francisco, particularly the Haight-Ashbury district, during these years. San Francisco is a westward-looking port city, a city that at the time was 'big enough' but not manic like New York City or spread out like Los Angeles. Hence, it could support a 'scene'. According to journalist Ed Vulliamy, "A core of Haight Ashbury bands played with each other, for each other".

According to an announcer for a TV show that Ralph J. Gleason hosted: "In his syndicated newspaper column, Mr. Gleason has been the foremost interpreter of the sounds coming out of what he calls 'the Liverpool of the United States.' Mr. Gleason believes the San Francisco rock groups are making a serious contribution to musical history." Ralph Gleason became one of the founders of what would become the rock-scene fan magazine Rolling Stone.

== Characteristics ==
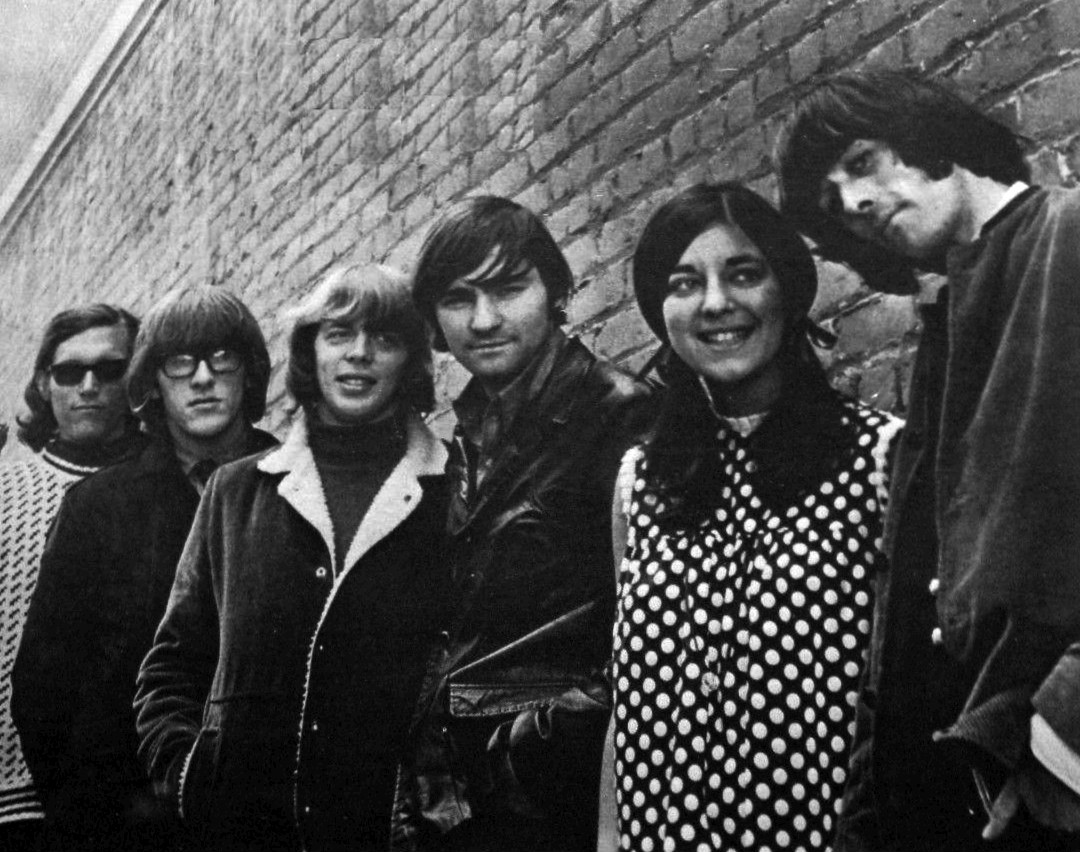
Jefferson Airplane's original personnel

The new sound, which melded many musical influences, was perhaps heralded in the live performances of Jefferson Airplane (from 1965 on), who put out an LP record earlier than nearly all the other new bands (August 1966). According to writer Douglas Brinkley, celebrated author Hunter S. Thompson, one of the Bay Area cultural-scene boosters, was a big early fan of the group: "Thompson extolled the sonic energy of the Jefferson Airplane as it pulsed around the California locales that nursed the psychedelic era..."

The bohemian predecessor of the hippie culture in San Francisco was the "Beat Generation" style of coffee houses and bars, whose clientele appreciated literature, a game of chess, music (in the forms of jazz and folk style), modern dance, and traditional crafts and arts like pottery and painting. Acoustic music had had an avid following far and wide, but it was "a fading world of traditional folk and Brechtian art songs." The entire tone of the new subculture was different. According to biography author Robert Greenfield, "Jon McIntire [manager of the Grateful Dead from the late sixties to the mid-eighties] points out that the great contribution of the hippie culture was this projection of joy. The beatnik thing was black, cynical, and cold." The Beats tended to be cagey, keeping their lives discreet (save for the few who published, in literary bursts, about their perceptions, enthusiasms, and activities); in a word, they generally "kept cool." The young hippies were far more numerous, less wary, and had scarcely any inclination to keep their lifestyles concealed.

The new music was loud and community-connected: bands sometimes presented free concerts in Golden Gate Park and "happenings" at the city's several psychedelic clubs and ballrooms. The many bands that formed signaled a shift from one subculture to the next.

Monterey, California is about 120 road miles south of San Francisco. At the June 1967 Monterey Pop Festival, Bay Area groups performed from the same stage as established and fast-rising musical groups and well-known individual artists from the U.S., the UK, and even India. Soon after, Ralph J. Gleason and Jann Wenner, based in San Francisco, established Rolling Stone magazine (first issue's date: November 1967).

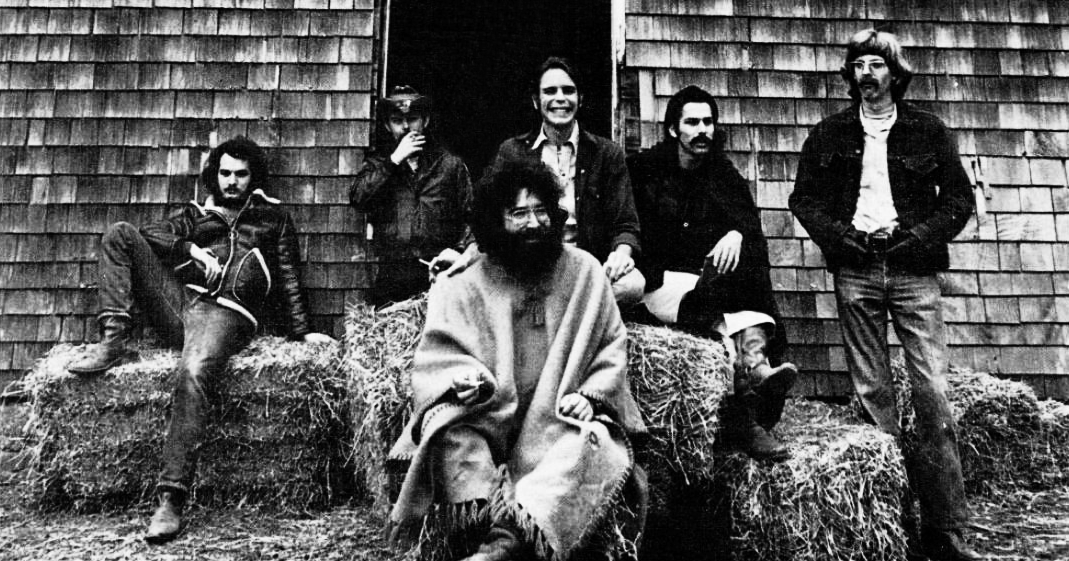
The Grateful Dead in December 1970

Each San Francisco band had its characteristic sound, but enough commonalities existed that there was a regional identity. By 1967, fresh and adventurous improvisation during live performance (which many heard as being epitomized by the Grateful Dead and by the "cross-talk" guitar work of Moby Grape) was one characteristic of the San Francisco sound. A louder, more prominent role for the electric bass—typically with a melodic or semi-melodic approach, and using a plush, pervasive tone—was another feature. This questing bass quality has been wryly characterized as a "roving" (rather than the conventional "stay-at-home") style. In jazz it had been exuberantly pioneered by numerous musicians. A musician who was a leading example of this, Jack Casady of Jefferson Airplane (and the offshoot Hot Tuna) pioneered the approach, perhaps best represented on the album Bless Its Pointed Little Head. Phil Lesh, bassist with the Grateful Dead, furthered this sound. Lesh had developed his style on the foundation of having studied classical, brass band, jazz, and modernist music on the violin and later the trumpet.

Exploration of chordal progressions previously uncommon in rock & roll, and a freer and more powerful use of all instruments (drums and other percussion, electric guitars, keyboards, as well as the bass) went along with this "psychedelic-era" music. Brasses and reeds, such as trumpets and saxophones, were rarely used, unlike in contemporary R&B and soul bands and some of the white bands from the U.S. East Coast (e.g., Blood, Sweat & Tears and Chicago). Sly & the Family Stone, a San Francisco–based group that got its start in the late 1960s, was an exception, being a racially integrated hippie band with a hefty influence from soul music, hence making use of brass instrumentation.

"Rock & roll" was the point of departure for the new music. But well known stars of rock & roll "were being called fifties primitives" by this time. This was the period when "rock" was differentiating itself from rock & roll, partly due to the upshot of the British Invasion. Among these British acts, according to music journalist Chris Smith, writing in his book on the most influential albums in American popular music, the Beatles inspired the emergence of the San Francisco psychedelic scene following their incorporation of folk rock on the 1965 album Rubber Soul, which reflected the reciprocal influences shared between the group and Bob Dylan. San Francisco historian Charles Perry recalled that in Haight-Ashbury, "You could party hop all night and hear nothing but Rubber Soul", and that "More than ever the Beatles were the soundtrack of the Haight-Ashbury, Berkeley and the whole circuit." In San Francisco, musical influences came in from not only London, Liverpool and Manchester, but also included the bi-coastal American folk music revival of the 1950s and 1960s, the Chicago electric blues scene, the soul music scenes in Detroit, Memphis, and Muscle Shoals, and jazz styles of various eras and regions. A number of key San Francisco rock musicians of the era cited John Coltrane and his circle of leading-edge jazz musicians as important influences.

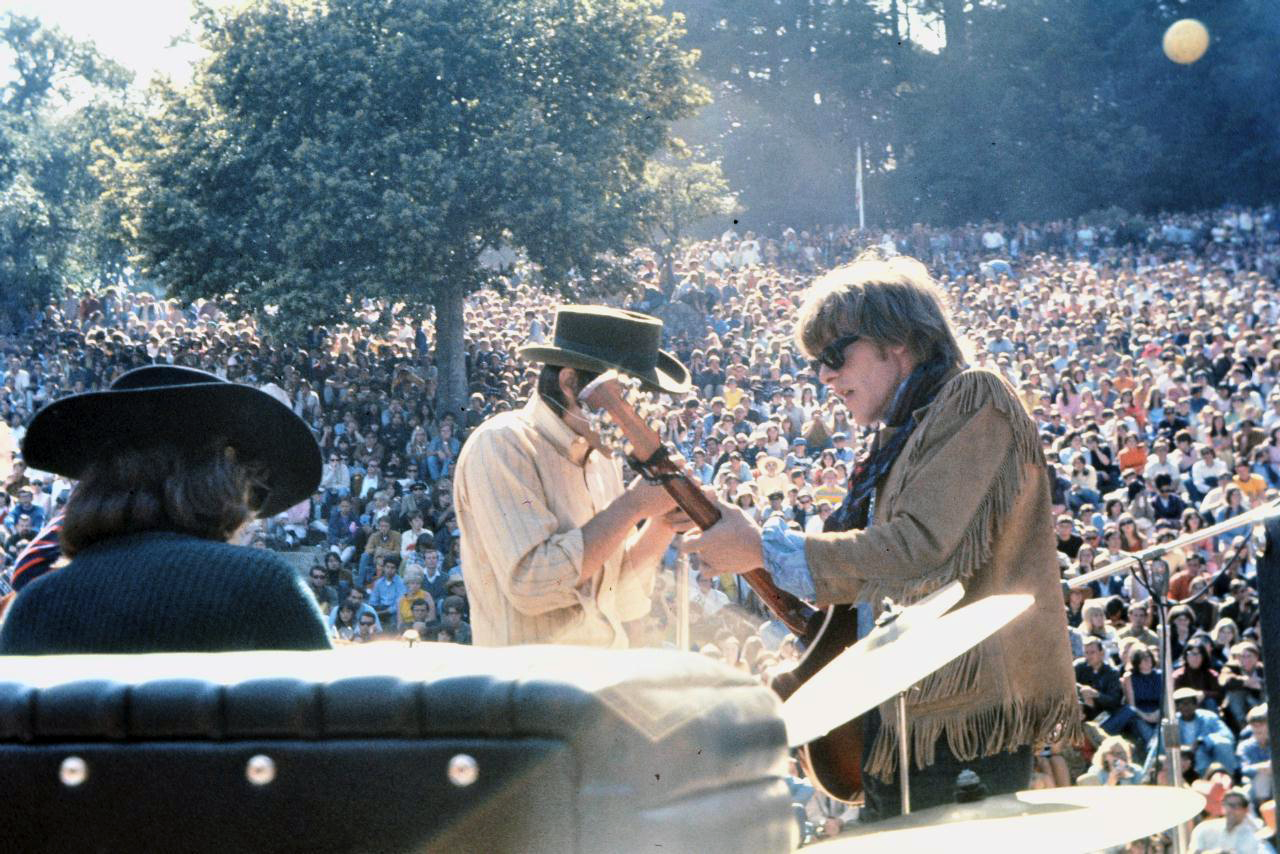
Members of Jefferson Airplane performing in June 1967

The journalist Ed Vulliamy wrote: "The Summer of Love had an empress, and her name was Janis Joplin." Women, in a few cases, enjoyed an equal status with men as stars in the San Francisco rock scene—but these few instances signaled a shift that has continued in the U.S. music scene. Both Grace Slick (singing with Jefferson Airplane) and Joplin (singing initially with Big Brother & the Holding Company) gained a substantial following locally and, before long, across the country.

Coming of age in the San Francisco Bay Area, famed singer/songwriter Stevie Nicks gained her first performing experience there in the 1960s with Lindsey Buckingham and his band. Nicks and Buckingham went on to bring that San Francisco sound to established British rock band Fleetwood Mac when they both joined in 1975.

== Venues ==
Performances of an international superstar group like the Beatles were hosted in a huge venue like the Cow Palace. At first, the local Bay Area bands played in smaller ones. The early band venues, while the new SF scene was emerging from folk and folk-rock beginnings, were often places like The Matrix nightclub. As audiences grew, and audience dancing became customary, performances moved into venues with more floor space, such as the Longshoreman's Hall, the Fillmore Auditorium, the Avalon Ballroom, Winterland, and the Carousel Ballroom (which was later renamed Fillmore West). Outdoor performances, often organized by the band members themselves and their friends, also played their part.

Because San Francisco had an especially vibrant and attractive countercultural scene in the latter half of the 1960s, musicians from elsewhere (along with the famous hip multitude) came there. Some stayed and became part of the scene. Examples include the Sir Douglas Quintet, whose music took on more of the character of the San Francisco sound, while yet retaining some of its original Texas flavor, Mother Earth, fronted by female lead singer Tracy Nelson, who relocated to the Bay Area from Nashville, and the Electric Flag, bringing Chicago blues to the Bay Area care of former Paul Butterfield Blues Band guitarist Mike Bloomfield. Steve Miller (who formed the Steve Miller Band) was from Wisconsin, by way of Chicago and New York City while bandmate Boz Scaggs originally called Texas home.

== AM and FM radio ==
The San Francisco bands' music was everything that AM-radio pop music wasn't. Their performances contrasted with the "standard three-minute track" that had become a cliché of the pop-music industry, due to the requirements of AM radio, to the sound capacity of the 45 RPM record, and to the limited potentials of many pop songs and song treatments. It is true that many of the San Francisco bands did record "three-minute" tracks when they desired pop-music station airplay for a song. But in live performance, the bands would often share their improvisatory zest by playing a given song or sequence for as long as five or six minutes, and occasionally for as long as half an hour.

Bay area resident Tom Donahue was a veteran disc jockey, songwriter, music-act manager, and concert producer (with an associate, he had produced the Beatles’ last show in their final public tour); he was inspired to revive a moribund radio station, KMPX, in early 1967. Donahue, inaugurating the first FM-radio rock station in San Francisco, intended to showcase this new genre of music. He was uniquely qualified, being savvy and enthusiastic about jazz, R&B, soul, and ethnic music. An important departure in this new era of "album oriented radio" (AOR) was that show hosts felt free to play lengthy tracks or two or more tracks at a stretch from a good record album.

According to cultural anthropologist Micaela di Leonardo, the San Francisco music scene was "a workshop for progressive soul", with the radio station KDIA in particular playing a role in showcasing the music of acts like Sly and the Family Stone.

== Associated artists ==
- A.B. Skhy
- The Ace of Cups
- The Beau Brummels
- Big Brother and the Holding Company
- Blackburn and Snow
- Blue Cheer
- The Charlatans
- Country Joe and the Fish
- Cold Blood
- Country Weather
- Copperhead
- Creedence Clearwater Revival
- Fifty Foot Hose
- The Final Solution
- Frumious Bandersnatch
- Grateful Dead
- The Great Society
- Hot Tuna
- H.P. Lovecraft
- It's a Beautiful Day
- Jefferson Airplane
- Joy of Cooking
- Journey
- Kozmic Blues Band
- Kak
- The Loading Zone
- Mad River
- Malo
- Moby Grape
- The Mojo Men
- Mother Earth
- Mount Rushmore
- The Mystery Trend
- The Neighb'rhood Childr'n
- New Riders of the Purple Sage
- The Other Half
- Quicksilver Messenger Service
- Salvation
- Santana
- The Savage Resurrection
- Sly and the Family Stone
- Sons of Champlin
- Sopwith Camel
- Stained Glass
- Steve Miller Band
- The Stone Poneys
- Tripsichord Music Box
- We Five
- Wendy and Bonnie

== See also ==
- California sound
- List of bands from the San Francisco Bay Area
- Music of California
- Love Is the Song We Sing: San Francisco Nuggets 1965–1970
- Woodstock
