= Garage Beat '66 Volume 3: Feeling Zero... =

Compilation album
- Released: April 27, 2004
- Recorded: 1960s
- Genre: Garage rock; psychedelic rock
- Length: 48:35
- Label: Sundazed

chronology
Garage Beat '66 Volume 2: Chicks are for Kids! (2004)	Garage Beat '66 Volume 3: Feeling Zero... (2004)	Garage Beat '66 Volume 4: I'm in Need! (2005)

Garage Beat '66 Volume 3: Feeling Zero... is a compilation album featuring rare material recorded by American psychedelic and garage rock bands that were active in the 1960s. The album's contents are sourced from the original master tapes. It is the third installment of the Garage Beat '66 series and was released on April 27, 2004, on Sundazed Music.

The album marks a point in the series in which the musical content began branching out to compile fuzz-drenched psychedelia and more standard pop rock-influenced numbers. Musical highlights include "Mother Nature/Father Earth", a rare 1968 single by the proto-punk band the Music Machine. The Preachers are represented with their snarling take of Bo Diddley's "Who Do You Love?", which received attention with its inclusion on Pebbles, Volume 1. Additional highlights include the Brogues' Pretty Things-inspired "Don't Shoot Me Down", Southwest F.O.B.'s cover version of "Smell of Incense", which became a moderate national hit, and the E-Types' harmonized pop song "She Moves Me". Further exploration into psychedelia is evident with the track "Feeling Zero" by the San Francisco group Neighb'rhood Childr'n.

Garage Beat '66 Volume 3: Feeling Zero... was strictly released to compact disc, and, like other albums in the series, is commended for its good sound-quality.

== Track listing ==
1. The Purple Underground: "Count Back" - 2:42
2. The Music Machine: "Mother Nature/Father Earth" - 2:14
3. The Others: "Revenge" - 2:00
4. The Answer: "I'll Be In" - 2:32
5. Living Children: "Crystalize Your Mind" - 2:50
6. The Preachers: "Who Do You Love?" - 2:16
7. The Great Scots: "I Ain't No Miracle Worker" - 2:44
8. The Mourning Reign: "Satisfaction Guaranteed" - 2:19
9. The Brogues: "Don't Shoot Me Down" - 2:20
10. Southwest F.O.B.: "Smell of Incense" - 2:43
11. The Mile Ends: "Bottle Up and Go" - 2:14
12. The E-Types: "She Moves Me" - 2:17
13. Butch Engle and the Styx: "Going Home" - 2:07
14. The Answer: "Why You Smile" - 2:35
15. The Rear Exit: "Miles Beyond" - 1:57
16. Moss and the Rocks: "There She Goes" - 2:55
17. The Preachers: "Stay Out of My World" - 2:33
18. Neighb'rhood Childr'n: "Feeling Zero" - 3:05
19. Living Children: "Now It's Over" - 2:05
20. The Brogues: "But Now I Find" - 2:16
