= Nuggets, Volume 7: Early San Francisco =

Compilation album by various artists
- Released: 1985
- Recorded: 1965–1966
- Genres: Folk rock; psychedelic rock; garage rock
- Label: Rhino
- Producer: Gene Sculatti

Various artists chronology
Nuggets, Volume 6: Punk Part Two (1985)	Nuggets, Volume 7: Early San Francisco (1985)	Nuggets, Volume 8: The Northwest (1985)

Nuggets, Volume 7: Early San Francisco is a compilation album featuring American psychedelic rock and folk rock musical artists from San Francisco, and their recordings prior to the Summer of Love. It is the seventh installment of the Nuggets series and was released on Rhino Records in 1985.

Musical highlights includes the Beau Brummels two biggest hits "Laugh, Laugh" and "Just a Little". The album also features a wide assortment of rarities including pre-Mojo Men group the Vejtables' minor hit "I Still Love You", the Great Society's original rendition of "Somebody to Love", and the raga rock-influenced "Free Advice". Country Joe and the Fish's first version of "Bass Strings", which appeared on their second self-produced extended play, received a more commercially accessible release with the album. Songs that charted on the Billboard 200 include "Laugh, Laugh" (#15), "Just a Little" (#8), "You Were on My Mind" (#3), and "I Still Love You" (#84).

Nuggets, Volume 7: Early San Francisco marks the first re-release for tracks by the Vejtables and the Tikis since their original distribution.

== Track listing ==
=== Side one ===
1. The Beau Brummels - "Laugh, Laugh"
2. The Beau Brummels - "Just a Little"
3. The Mojo Men - "Dance with Me"
4. The Mojo Men - "She's My Baby"
5. The Vejtables - "I Still Love You"
6. The Vejtables - "The Last Thing on My Mind"
7. Jan Ashton - "Cold Dreary Morning"

=== Side two ===
1. We Five - "You Were on My Mind"
2. We Five - "You Let a Love Burn Out"
3. The Charlatans - "Codine"
4. The Great Society - "Somebody to Love"
5. The Great Society - "Free Advice"
6. Country Joe and the Fish - "Bass Strings"
7. The Tikis - "I Must Be Dreaming"
