= The Preachers =

American rock band (1964–1966)

Background information
- Origin: Los Angeles, California, United States
- Genres: Garage rock; proto-punk; folk rock
- Years active: 1964–1966
- Labels: Moonglow
- Past members: Richard Fortunato; Hal Tennant; Zeke "Jim" Camarillo; Rudy Garza; Steve Lagana; Burke Reynolds; John English

The Preachers were an American garage rock band formed in Los Angeles, California, in 1964. Musically, the group took an intense, and pounding musical approach that was heavily influenced by the British Invasion groups, particularly the Rolling Stones and the Dave Clark Five, and their take on American R&B. In their brief recording career, the Preachers released three singles, with their most acclaimed recording being a high-energy rendition of Bo Diddley's, "Who Do You Love?".

== History ==
The band members had prior experience performing in rock and roll groups on local college circuits. In 1964, the Preachers' future personnel encountered each other at tryouts for a backing band. After their initial rehearsals, the band decided to form their own separate ensemble with a lineup including Richard Fortunato (lead vocals, rhythm guitar), Hal Tennant (lead guitar), Zeke "Jim" Camarillo (bass guitar), Rudy Garza (piano), and Steve Lagana (drums). The Preachers soon became a popular attraction within venues in Los Angeles and San Fernando Valley, particularly in a long-running stint at a teen dance club called Herman Hovers. It was during this time the group opened for prominent musical acts such as the Byrds, the Seeds, and the Leaves, and attracted the attention of manager Jerry Fonarow.

Through connections in the music industry, the group signed a recording contract with Moonglow Records. For their debut single, the Preachers recorded a rendition of Bo Diddley's "Who Do You Love?", which music historian Tony Viscounti described as "jettisoning the (very little) subtlety and nuance of Diddley's original, the Preachers produced harmonies that sounded like they were clearing their throats, a surf-guitar break, and an effect as though keyboard player Rudy Garza was bashing his instrument while wearing boxing gloves". The band performed the song on the television program, Shivaree, showcasing Fortunato's over-the-top vocals and the group's priest-like outfits. However, the Preachers' record label fired Fortunato for his rendition of "Who Do You Love?", prior to completing their second single, "The Zeke".

Fortunato later joined the folk rock group the Vejtables, co-writing the band's final single, "Shadow", before other members left to join the Mojo Men. With folk singer Burk Reynolds, the Preachers released two more singles with lesser success before replacing Reynolds with John English. In late 1965, the band returned to their raw, punk sound, and christened themselves John English and the Lemon Drops for their final release, "Moanin'". Since their disbandment in early 1966, "Who Do You Love?" has become a staple of the musical genre of garage rock, and similar renditions were recorded, most notably by the Woolies later in the year. The Preachers' version was also included on the 1979 compilation album Pebbles, Volume 1 and Teenage Shutdown! Jump, Jive & Harmonize. In 2002, an extended play called Moanin' was released and featured all of the group's material on their four singles.
