= Ron Nagle =

American artist (born 1939)

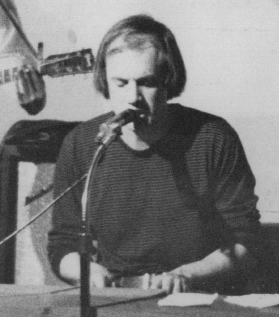
- Nagle with The Mystery Trend in 1966
- Born: February 21, 1939 (age 87); San Francisco, California, U.S.
- Education: B.F.A., San Francisco State College, 1961
- Known for: Sculpture
- Awards: Arts and Letters Award; American Craft Council Fellowship; National Endowment for the Arts Fellowship

Ron Nagle, Untitled, glazed and overglazed earthenware, c. 1970, Smithsonian American Art Museum

Ron Nagle (born February 21, 1939) is an American sculptor, musician and songwriter. He is known for small-scale, refined sculptures of great detail and compelling color.

Nagle lives and works in San Francisco, California.

== Life ==
Born in San Francisco in 1939, Nagle was introduced to ceramics by his mother at an early age. He practiced ceramics in high school and developed an interest in jewelry-making which he pursued into his college years. Nagle enrolled as an English major at San Francisco State College, but later switched to the school's BFA, and graduated with a focus in ceramics in 1961.

Between 1961 and 1978, Nagle taught ceramics at San Francisco Art Institute, California College of Arts and Crafts, as well as at the University of California Berkeley, where he apprenticed to Peter Voulkos, a core member of the Abstract Expressionist Ceramics. In 1978, Nagle began a professorship at Mills College, where he taught ceramics for over 30 years.

His involvement in West Coast culture—surfing, rock music, hot rod culture—is integral to both his art and music. Nagle owned a 1948 Ford Coupe to which he applied 40 coats of British racing green, sanding between each layer to achieve depth of color. This same fanaticism is evident in the detailed color and texture of his sculptures.

== Work ==
Nagle has practiced ceramics for over 50 years. He has worked extensively with the typology of the vessel—specifically the cup—and pushed through the utilitarian concerns of traditional craft into formal consideration of the medium. His small-scale, intimately sized sculptures are often composite of multiple elements and involve a confluence of techniques and materials including slip-casting, airbrushing, hand-molding, traditional and non-traditional glazing, scalp-metal, polyurethane, wax, and epoxy.

Drawing is fundamental to Nagle's practice, and he considers his work from a two-dimensional, flat point of view. This resonates with his stated interest in painting, where he cites influences such as Giorgio Morandi, Cy Twombly, and Billy Al Bengston.

His work is associated with the California Clay Movement, and Nagle is often included in exhibitions concerning Abstract Expressionism. Although Nagle has shied away from association with the traditional craft of ceramics, he has noted the influence of his contemporary sculptors working in the medium, such as Kenneth Price, as well as such vernaculars as Japanese Momoyama ceramics and 1940s American restaurant ware. Nagle also looks further, mining uncanny sources such as cartoons, graffiti, food arrangement and fashion for inspiration.

=== Music ===
Apart from his sculpture, Nagle is also a musician and songwriter. In 1965, he founded the "San Francisco Sound" rock'n'roll band The Mystery Trend with a group of friends while at the San Francisco Art Institute. Nagle has also completed several solo albums, including Bad Rice that was released by Warner Bros. in 1970. In 1975 Nagle met singer, songwriter, producer and multi-instrumentalist Scott Mathews and formed a songwriting and production company. Together, the two wrote songs that sold in the millions and released their own album on Capitol Records in 1979 that received a 5-star rating in Rolling Stone and scored some European hits.

Nagle also worked on the sound effects for The Exorcist (1973). The artist magnified and distorted sounds of jar-trapped bees and shattering windows to create disturbing effects in the horror film.

== Exhibitions ==
Nagle's first solo exhibition was in 1968 at Dilexi Gallery in San Francisco. Since then, his work has been exhibited extensively, including solo exhibitions at the Saint Louis Art Museum, Carnegie Museum of Art, San Diego Museum of Art, and Museum Boijmans Van Beuningen.

Thirty of Nagle's ceramics were included in the exhibition "The Encyclopedic Palace," curated by Massimiliano Gioni for the 55th Venice Biennale in 2013.

== Grants and awards ==
2011
Arts and Letters Award, American Academy of Arts and Letters

2008
Joan Danforth Endowed Faculty Chair, Mills College

2006-07
Metz Chair, Mills College

1998
Flintridge Foundation Visual Artist Award
The Best of 1998, Dave Hickey, Artforum

1997
Fellow of the American Craft Council

1996
Joan Danforth Endowed Faculty Chair, Mills College

1990–97
Faculty Research Grant, Mills College

1986
National Endowments for the Arts Fellowship

1984
Faculty Research Grant, Mills College

1983
Mellon Grant

1981
Mellon Grant

1979
Lucie Stern Chair, Mills College
National Endowments for the Arts Fellowship

1978
Adaline Kent Award, San Francisco Art Institute

1974
National Endowments for the Arts Fellowship
