= Teenage Shutdown! Jump, Jive & Harmonize =

Compilation album
- Released: October 6, 1998
- Recorded: 1960s
- Genre: Garage rock; proto-punk
- Label: Crypt

chronology
Teenage Shutdown! Jump, Jive & Harmonize (1998)	Teenage Shutdown! You Treated Me Bad! (1998)

Teenage Shutdown! Jump, Jive & Harmonize (subtitled Pounding, Pulverizing, All-Out Punk Dance Ravers) is a compilation album featuring garage rock musical artists that recorded during the 1960s. It is the first installment of the Teenage Shutdown! series, and was released on Crypt Records on October 6, 1998 (see 1998 in music).

Musical highlights include the title track by the Latino band Thee Midniters, which was recorded relatively live, and is marked by Willie Garcia's raucous lead vocals and harmonica-organ duel arrangements. The Five Americans, who are best known for their Top Ten hit "Western Union", are featured with their early cover version of "Slippin' and Slidin'". Arguably the rarest track on the album is the Shandells' "Gorilla", which reportedly only had 100 copies released. The only song on the album to chart is Del Shannon's lesser-known piece, "Move It on Over", reaching number 128 nationally. Among the more recognizable compositions are the Preachers' rendition of "Who Do You Love?", the Groupies' "I'm a Hog for You", and the Human Beings' "Ain't That Lovin' You Baby", all of which have appeared on several other compilations.

Teenage Shutdown! Jump, Jive & Harmonize comprises singles collected by Mark Markesich, also known as "Moptop Mike". It was originally distributed on both compact disc and LP formats. The album was rereleased on LP in 2012.

== Track listing ==
1. Thee Midniters: "Jump, Jive, and Harmonize" - 2:20
2. The Jolly Green Giants: "Busy Body" - 2:04
3. The Five Americans: "Slippin' and Slidin'" - 1:55
4. The Us Four: "The Alligator" - 2:48
5. The Incrowd: "Set Me Free" - 1:55
6. The Cobras: "I Wanna Be Your Love" - 2:57
7. Count and the Colony: "Can't You See" - 2:37
8. Del Shannon: "Move It on Over " - 2:58
9. Mark and the Escorts: "Get Your Baby" - 2:02
10. Jimmy Stokely and the Exiles: "It's Alligator Time" - 2:19
11. Los Shains: "El Monstruo" - 2:21
12. Baby Huey and the Babysitters: "Monkey Man" - 2:30
13. The Shandells: "Gorilla" - 2:50
14. The Centurys: "83" - 2:27
15. The Twiliters: "(Everybody's Goin' to) Rollerland" - 2:30
16. The Esquires: "Come on, Come on" - 1:40
17. The Preachers: "Who Do You Love" - 2:11
18. Mr. Lucky and the Gamblers: "Take a Look at Me" - 2:52
19. The Groupies: "I'm a Hog for You" - 2:55
20. The Human Beings: "Ain't That Lovin' You, Baby" - 2:37
