= Garage Beat '66 Volume 1: Like What, Me Worry?! =

Compilation album
- Released: April 27, 2004
- Recorded: 1960s
- Genres: Garage rock; psychedelic; folk rock
- Length: 49:09
- Label: Sundazed

chronology
Garage Beat '66 Volume 1: Like What, Me Worry?! (2004)	Garage Beat '66 Volume 2: Chicks are for Kids! (2004)

Garage Beat '66 Volume 1: Like What, Me Worry?! is the first installment in the Garage Beat '66 series of garage rock compilations issued by Sundazed Music, which is available exclusively on compact disc. It features well-researched liner notes, written by recognized garage rock authorities, which supply background information about each song and act, often including photographs of the bands. Like all of the entries in the series it is noted for good sound quality as all of the tracks are mastered from the original studio master sources.

The set opens with "Like What, Me Worry," by (006). Also featured are two cuts by the Sparkles from Levelland, Texas: "No Friend of Mine" and "Hipsville 29 B.C. (I Need Help)." Fellow Lone Star State residents, Neal Ford and the Fanatics, of Houston perform "Shame on You," replete with its highly idiosyncratic guitar solo. The Fe-Fi-Four Plus 2 provide the bad acid trip-saga, "I Wanna Come Back (From the World of LSD)." Matthew Moore Plus Four cover Buffy Sainte-Marie's oft-covered garage folk anthem "Codyne (She's Real)" and the Words of Luv do a rendition P.F. Sloans "I'd Have to Be Outta My Mind." The set also includes the unlikely presence of John Hammond Jr. covering Billy Boy Arnold's "I Wish You Would," with Bill Wyman on bass and Robbie Robertson on guitar, doing a different take of the number than the one which appears on his So Many Roads album.

== Track listing ==
1. 006: "Like What, Me Worry" 2:34
2. The Country Gentlemen: "Saturday Night" 1:55
3. Fever Tree: "I Can Beat Your Drum" 2:03
4. The Sparkles: "Hipsville 29 B.C. (I Need Help)" 2:11
5. The Centuries: "Hard Times" (Billy Beard) 2:26
6. The Kreeg: "Impressin'" (Bob Sturtcman) 2:38
7. The "In": "Just Give Me Time" 2:20
8. The Ban: "Bye Bye" (Tony McGuire) 2:44
9. Executioners: "I Want the Rain" 2:43
10. The Odyssey: "Little Girl, Little Boy" (Jerry Berke) 2:22
11. Matthew Moore Plus Four: "Codyne (She's Real)" (Buffy Sainte-Marie) 2:51
12. Words of Luv: "I'd Have to Be Outta My Mind" (P.F. Sloan) 2:49
13. Five Of Us: "Hey You" 2:14
14. John Hammond, Jr.: "I Wish You Would" (Billy Boy Arnold) 2:40
15. Just Two Guys: "Eyes" 2:47
16. Olivers: "Beeker Street" 2:04
17. Neal Ford and the Fanatics: "Shame on You" (Bobbye Johnson) 2:13
18. Smokestack Lightnin': "Look What You've Done" (Ronnie Darling/Ric Eiserling) 2:54
19. The Sparkles: "No Friend of Mine" (Jay Turnbow) 2:24
20. The Fe-Fi-Four Plus 2: "I Wanna Come Back (From the World of LSD)" (Danny Houlihan) 2:17

== Catalogue and release information ==
- Compact disc (SC 11139)
