= Ear-Piercing Punk =

Compilation album
- Released: LP – 1979± CD – 1996
- Recorded: Mid-1960s
- Genre: Garage rock
- Label: Trash

Ear-Piercing Punk is a compilation album issued in both LP and CD formats of obscure 1960s garage rock that was originally released on AIP Records in the late 1970s. As discussed on the AIP Records website and in reviews of the album during its initial release, the album was given the name "Ear-Piercing Punk" to try to market or turn this music, now often referred to as proto punk, on to kids just getting into punk rock for the first time as a result of the 1970s punk explosion. The purpose of the album was to show that punk had existed for quite a number of years prior to the generally accepted mainstream use of the term to define bands such as the Ramones, Sex Pistols and The Clash.

== Track listing ==
=== LP ===
Side 1:

1. "I'm a Hog for You" – The Groupies
2. "Ubangi Stomp" – The Trashmen
3. "Rebel Woman" – Dean Carter
4. "Nonstop Blues" – Outlaw Blues
5. "Bottle Up and Go" – Mile Ends
6. "I Feel Like Crying" – Sound Extraction
7. "Enough" – Bohemian Vendetta
8. "Jailhouse Rock" – Dean Carter

Side 2:

1. "No Friend of Mine" – The Sparkles
2. "Don't Crowd Me" – Keith Kessler
3. "Mister, You're a Better Man Than I" – The Herde
4. "Runnin' Thru the Night" – Mistic Tide
5. "(Your Love Is Like a) Magnet" – Age of Reason
6. "Little Black Egg" – The Kommotions
7. "She Ain't No Use to Me" – The Ugly Ducklings
8. "I Need Love" – The Third Booth

=== CD ===
1. "I'm a Hog for You" - The Groupies
2. "Nonstop Blues" - Outlaw Blues
3. "Bottle Up and Go" - Mile Ends
4. "I Feel Like Crying" - Sound Extraction
5. "Enough" - Bohemian Vendetta
6. "Don't Crowd Me" - Keith Kessler
7. "Magnet" - Age of Reason
8. "Little Black Egg" - The Kommotions
9. "She Ain't No Use to Me" - The Ugly Ducklings
10. "Primitive" - The Groupies
11. "Growth" - The Guys Who Came up from Downstairs
12. "I Can Only Give You Everything" - Bram Rigg Set
13. "Train Kept A-Rollin'" - Precious Few
14. "Psychedelic Retraction" - Creations Disciple
15. "Gotta Hear the Beat" - Animal Jack
16. "Down the Road Apiece" - Color
17. "Young Miss Larsen" - Color
18. "Just If She's There" - Dennis & The Times
19. "You Better Stop" - Maltese
20. "No More" - Oscar Five

== See also ==
- List of garage rock bands
- Garage rock
- Nuggets (series)
- Pebbles (series)
- Back from the Grave (series)
