= Bohemian Vendetta =

American rock band (1966–1968)

- Bohemian Vendetta in 1967

Background information
- Origin: Long Island, New York, United States
- Genres: Garage rock; psychedelic rock; acid rock; proto-punk
- Years active: 1966-1968
- Label: Mainstream
- Past members: Arthur Muglia (aka Brian Cooke); Victor Muglia; Nick Manzi; Randy Pollock; Chuck Monica; Richard Martinez; Richie Sorrento

Bohemian Vendetta was an American garage rock and psychedelic band from Long Island, New York, who were active from 1966 to 1968. In addition to recording two officially released singles and several previously unissued demos, they cut a self-titled album, Bohemian Vendetta, released by Mainstream Records in 1968.

== History ==
Bohemian Vendetta was formed as the Bohemians in 1966 in Long Island, New York. Their original lineup consisted of Arthur Muglia (also known as Brian Cooke) on lead vocals and organ, his cousin Victor Muglia on bass, Randy Pollock on rhythm guitar, Richard Martinez on lead guitar, and Richie Sorrento on drums. Initially the band had a strongly blues-based sound, reminiscent of Pretty Things, and the Shadows of Knight. Under this line-up the band recorded two demo acetate singles in 1966 at Ultrasonic Studios in Hempstead (on Long Island), "Irresistible" b/w "Petrified, Like Stoned" (later referred to as "Like Stoned") and "I Don't Go that Way" b/w "All Kinds of Lows and All Kinds of Highs". The band recorded demos of several more songs and released the single "Enough" b/w "Half of the Time" on the United Artists label. While the single got a spot on the "Rate a Record" segment of Dick Clark's American Bandstand, it failed to chart.

However, the band's demos came to the attention of Bob Shad's Mainstream Records, a company known for minimal production values and promotion, often releasing albums by unknown bands targeted for the underground FM radio market, and who released the first album by Big Brother and the Holding Company and the first three albums by the Amboy Dukes, Ted Nugent's early band (including their popular hit "Journey to the Center of the Mind").

From Long Island's Lynbrook, future member Nick Manzi had played in a number of bands in the area, including the Cavaliers. He and Faine Jade had formed the Rustics who recorded "Cant' Get you Out of My Heart" b/w "Look at Me" for the Ye Old King Label. After the Rusics broke up Manzi joined the Bohemians, replacing lead guitarist Richard Martinez, who went on the join the Cats Meow, who recorded a few singles for Decca. In 1967 the Bohemians changed their name to Bohemian Vendetta. More personnel changes were to come that year. After Nick Manzi's entry, Randy Pollock switched from guitar to bass, and Chuck Monica replaced Richie Sorrento on drums. Bohemian Vendetta played at venues such as the Action House with such bands as the Vagrants and Vanilla Fudge.

Bohemian Vendetta had already recorded demos of most of the songs intended for their album to be released on Mainstream, but Bob Shad insisted that they re-record all of the songs, so they cut new versions in 1968. However, some have noted that the results did not capture the feel of the demos, which were more representative of the band's actual sound. Nearly all of their material was written by the band, but Shad asked them to record the Rolling Stones' "Satisfaction". Bohemian Vendetta's self-titled album, finally came out in the fall of 1968. The album reflected both psychedelic and R&B influences an included standout tracks such as "Riddles & Fairlytales," "Paradox City," "I Wanna Touch Your Heart," and "Love Can Make Your Mind Go Wild," not to mention renditions of songs previously recorded by other artists, such as "Satisfaction," and "House of the Rising Sun." However, Mainstream did little to promote the album or its single, "Riddles and Fairytales" b/w "I Wanna Touch Your Heart," resulting in disappointing sales. That year, the band also backed Faine Jade on his Introspection album. In late 1968 Bohemian Vendetta broke up.

Over the intervening years since their breakup, Bohmian Vendetta's work has been included on several anthologies. Their song "Enough" was included on the 1979 Ear-Piercing Punk compilation put out by Greg Shaw's Bomp! Records, then later on Essential Pebbles, Volume 1. "All Kinds of Highs" has also been reissued on compilations. In 1998 the band's complete work, including their 1968 album and all of their acetates, was released on the Enough anthology.

== Membership ==
=== 1966 ===
- Arthur Muglia (also known as Brian Cooke) (lead vocals and organ)
- Victor Muglia (bass)
- Randy Pollock (rhythm guitar)
- Richard Martinez (lead guitar)
- Richie Sorrento (drums)

=== 1967-1968 ===
- Arthur Muglia (also known as Brian Cooke) (lead vocals and organ)
- Victor Muglia (bass)
- Nick Manzi (lead guitar)
- Randy Pollock (rhythm guitar),
- Chuck Monica (drums)

== Discography ==
=== Singles ===
- "Irresistible" b/w "Petrified, Like Stoned" (later referred to as "Like Stoned") (unissued acetate, rec. 1966)
- "I Don't Go that Way" b/w "All Kinds of Lows and All Kinds of Highs" (unissued acetate, rec. 1966)
- "Enough" b/w "Half of the Time" (United Artists UA 50174, 1967)
- "Riddles and Fairytales" b/w "I Wanna Touch Your Heart," (Mainstream, 1968)

=== Album ===
- Bohemian Vendetta (Mainstream Stereo: S/6106 Mono: 56106, 1968)
