= The Sparkles =

American garage rock band

- Origin: Levelland, Texas, United States
- Genres: Garage rock
- Years active: 1957–1972
- Labels: Caron, Hickory, Sundazed
- Past members: Guy Balew; Jesse Balew; Gary Blakey; Bob Donnell; Don Settle; Carl Huckaby; Stanley Smith; Johnny Waller; Charlie Hatchett; Harold "Lucky" Floyd; Donnie Roberts; Bobby Smith; Louie Holt; Jimmy Marriot; Gary P. Nunn; Steve Weisberg

The Sparkles were an American garage rock band from Levelland, Texas, that were active between 1957 and 1972. However, the most popular version of the band was the line-up that existed from 1965 to 1967, and which recorded the songs "No Friend of Mine" and "Hipsville 29 B. C."

== History ==
The first line-up of the Sparkles consisted of Stanley Smith and Carl Huckeby on guitars, Bob Donnell on bass, Johnny Waller on piano, brothers Jesse and Guy Balew on saxophone and vocals, and Gary Blakey on drums. The band made their first recording in 1958 for legendary record producer Norman Petty (who also worked with Buddy Holly and Roy Orbison), but the recording went unreleased. This line-up broke up shortly thereafter and reformed with Gary Blakey on drums, Charlie Hatchett and Stanley Smith on guitars, and Don Settle on bass and backing vocals.

The band line-up changed again when drummer Harold "Lucky" Floyd, bassist Bobby Smith, and guitarist Donnie Roberts joined the group, with Hatchett leaving to form his own group, The Raiders, along with Blakey. This line-up, the third, became quite popular locally and started playing in clubs in west Texas. Due to disagreements among the band members, this line-up also broke up. Harold "Lucky" Floyd and Bobby Smith then recruited Louie Holt, Gary P. Nunn, and the drummer Jimmy Marriott, resulting in the fourth line-up having two drummers, although Floyd would sometimes sing.

Nashville record producers Larry Parks and Jay Turnbow offered to sign the band to Hickory Records. The band agreed and released the 1966 single "The Hip" (written by Parks, Turnbow and Joe Melson), which became a major hit in Austin. Soon thereafter, the songs "Something That You Said" and "Jack and the Beanstalk" were recorded. All of these recordings were done in Odessa, Texas, at Tommy Allsup's Westex Studio. The following year, the band recorded "No Friend of Mine" and "Hipsville 29 B. C." in Nashville, Tennessee. When Nunn and Holt decided to quit the band, around 1968, Floyd, Smith, and Marriott relocated to California and changed the band's name to the Pearly Gate, making a handful of appearances in a television series called Judd, for the Defense. They later returned to Austin and reformed the Sparkles and it was during this period that Steve Weisberg, future guitarist of The John Denver Band, joined the band.

The Sparkles finally disbanded in 1972, with Floyd returning to California to play with Red Wilder Blue. A number of commentators, including author Jeff Jarema, have noted that during the band's almost fifteen years of existence and various different line-ups, the version of the group that made the name the Sparkles best known was the fourth line-up, which recorded the "Hipsville 29 B. C." and "No Friend of Mine" singles.

Over the years, songs by the band have appeared on several various artists compilations: "The U.T." appeared on Highs in the Mid-Sixties, Volume 17, "I Want to Be Free" was included on Turds On A Bum Ride, Vol. 1, and "Hipsville 29 B. C." has appeared on Mayhem & Psychosis, Vol. 2 and Garage Beat '66, Vol. 1. In addition, "No Friend of Mine" has appeared on the 1998 Nuggets: Original Artyfacts from the First Psychedelic Era, 1965–1968 box set, the CD version of Pebbles, Volume 1, Songs We Taught The Fuzztones, Garage Beat '66, Vol. 1, Uptight Tonight: Ultimate 60's Garage Collection, Acid Dreams: Testament, Trash Box, Best of Pebbles, Vol. 1, and Ear-Piercing Punk.

== Band members ==
- Guy Ballew - vocals (first line-up)
- Jesse Ballew - saxophone (first line-up)
- Gary Blakey - drums (first and second line-up)
- Bob Donnell - bass (first line-up)
- Carl Huckeby - guitar (first line-up)
- Stanley Smith - guitar (first, second, and third line-up)
- Johnny Waller - piano (first line-up)
- Charlie Hatchett - guitar (second line-up)
- Harold "Lucky" Floyd - drums, vocals (third, fourth, and fifth line-up)
- Donnie Roberts - guitar (third line-up)
- Don Settle - bass, vocals (second line-up)
- Bobby Smith - bass, vocals (third, fourth, and fifth line-up)
- Louie Holt - guitar (fourth line-up)
- Jimmy Marriott - drums (fourth and fifth line-up)
- Gary P. Nunn - guitar (fourth line-up)
- Steve Weisberg - guitar (fifth line-up)

== Discography ==
=== Singles ===
- "The U.T."/"He Can't Love You" (Caron 94) 1962
- "The Hip"/"Oh Girls, Girls" (Hickory 1364) 1966 and (Triola TD 311) 1966
- "Something That You Said"/"Daddy Gonna Put the Hurt on You" (Hickory 1390) 1966
- "Jack and the Beanstalk"/"Oh Girls, Girls" (Hickory 1406) 1966
- "The Hip"/"Jack and the Beanstalk" (Triola TD 323) 1966
- "No Friend of Mine"/"First Forget (What Has Made You Blue)" (Hickory 1443) 1967
- "Hipsville 29 B. C."/"I Want to Be Free" (Hickory 1474) 1967 and (Festival SPX 10) 1968

=== EPs ===
- No Friend of Mine (Sundazed SEP 176) 2005
