= The Mystery Trend =

American garage rock band

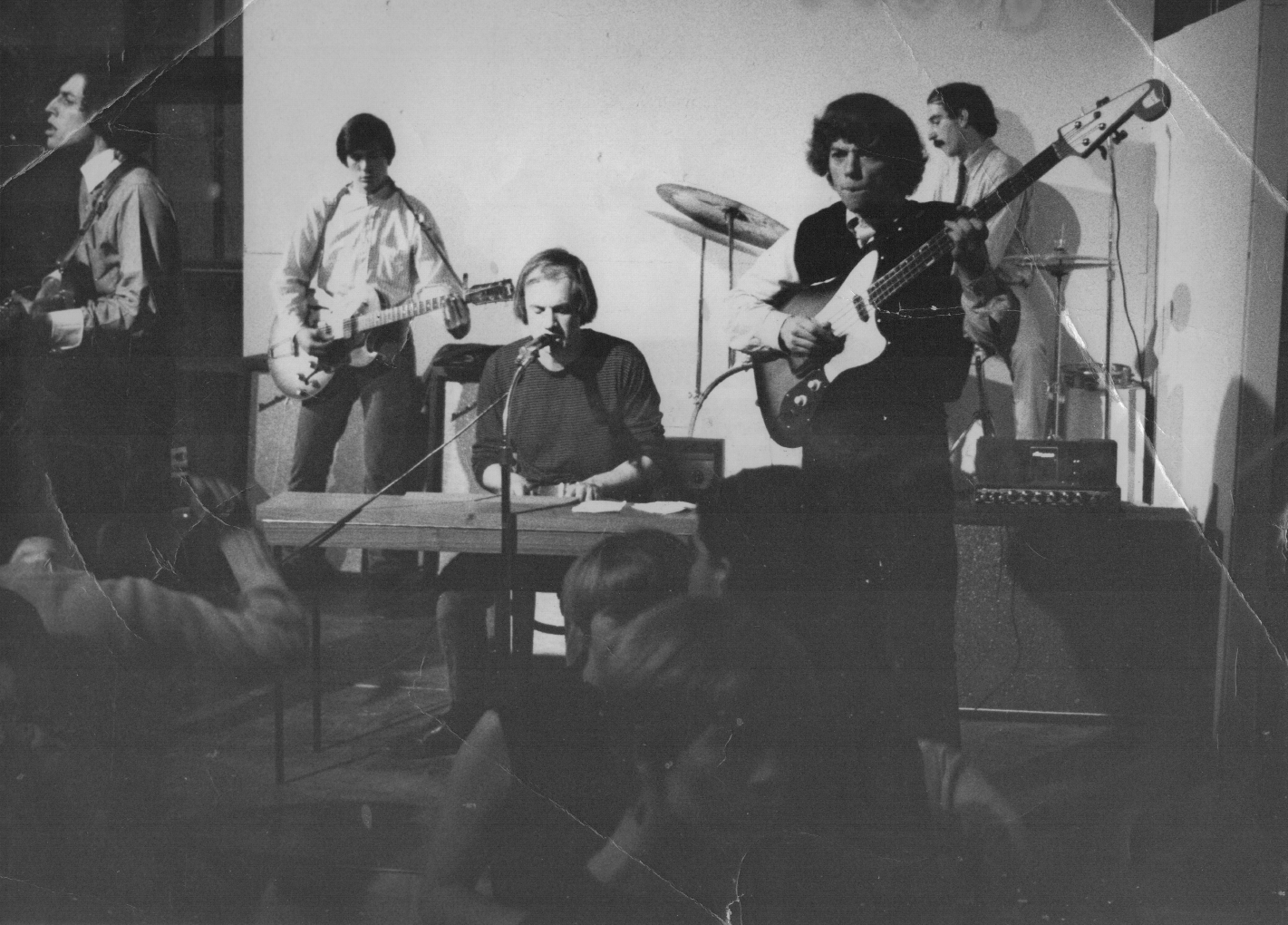
- The Mystery Trend in 1966

Background information
- Origin: San Francisco, California, U.S.
- Genres: Garage rock; R&B; psychedelic rock
- Years active: 1964–1968
- Label: Verve
- Past members: Ron Nagle; John Gregory; Larry Bennett; John Luby; Bob Cuff; Larry West

The Mystery Trend was an American garage rock band formed in San Francisco, California in 1964. The band was among the first wave of San Francisco rock groups to emerge from the city's growing music scene. Exhibiting music prowess leaning toward R&B, the Mystery Trend were set apart from their contemporaries who later developed into psychedelic rock groups. Their recording output was limited, with the group's one single, "Johnny Was a Good Boy", being released in 1967.

== History ==
The group came to fruition in 1964 thanks to Ron Nagle (keyboards, vocals), an R&B enthusiast enamored with the recordings of Ray Charles. While studying at San Francisco State College, he met Larry Bennett (lead vocals), who also shared similar musical tastes. As the British Invasion brought rock and roll back to the conscience of San Francisco's pop audience, Nagle and Bennett formed the Terrazzo Brothers with fellow college students Bob Cuff (rhythm guitar), Mike Daly (bass guitar), and John Luby (drums). For the most part, the band tended to remove themselves from the music of the Beatles, instead playing interpretations of R&B songs. After a year, the Terrazzo Brothers saw Daly assume the role of manager, Bennett taking his former position, and newcomer Larry West (lead guitar) was brought in to fill the group's vacancy at guitar. The band changed their name to the Mystery Trend, a mishearing of the "Mystery Tramp" featured in the lyrics to Bob Dylan's "Like a Rolling Stone".

The Mystery Trend developed a local following, becoming one of the earliest rock groups to perform at the Matrix. In the same regard, the band was one of the first ensembles to be associated with the San Francisco Sound, alongside the original Jefferson Airplane, the Great Society, the Charlatans, and the Vejtables, among their other contemporaries. They also were involved in three San Francisco Mime Troupe benefits, which hold significance as they were promoter Bill Graham's earliest attempts at advertising rock music to the public. During their brief stints at the Matrix, the Mystery Trend exhibited a cutting-edge style unique to their music scene, that produced unconventional chord progressions. Unlike their contemporaries, the band was less interested in the free-form psychedelia-tinged instrumentals, that came to define San Francisco's music scene, but rather they attempted to pack multiple influences into organized structures.

In December 1965, the Mystery Trend was recorded during a performance at the San Francisco Museum of Modern Art. Their set list has been circulated through record collectors and offers an insight into the band's development as a live act and their songwriters. Music historian Alec Palao, writing on the recording in his magazine Cream Puff War, characterizes the band to be "Concurrent with the Great Society, the Trend seemed to have absorbed an experimental, easternish feel to their songwriting by late 1965. Both 'I Wish I Knew' and 'Casbah' reflect this, with droning guitars and sighing harmonies, not unlike some of the Velvet Underground's early stuff; not as noisy or distorted as that band but with similar crescendos of sound".

West departed the band in early 1966, after smashing his guitar in the middle of a gig with the Great Society. Cuff filled in at guitar, but he too left the Mystery Trend and was replaced by John Gregory. The group's out-of-synch musical style proved to be their downfall as several San Francisco bands began agreeing to recording contracts and receiving considerable airplay. Aside from their one-off single, "Johnny Was a Good Boy" in 1967, with Verve Records, the Mystery Trend were completely unrepresented recording-wise. Verve Records failed to adequately promote the release and the single was a commercial flop. Frank Werber, manager of the Kingston Trio, recorded demos with the band that went unreleased until they were officially issued by Big Beat Records in 1999, on the So Glad I Found You album.

In 1968, the group disbanded, mostly due to their inability to gather enough interest in a record deal. All members, except Bennett, still were at the least partially involved in later music career. Nagle released some solo works, penned "Don't Touch Me There" for the Tubes, and also became a successful ceramic artist. John Gregory played in later lineups of the Blues Project, from 1968.

== Members ==
- Ron Nagle – lead vocals, keyboards, clavinet
- Larry Bennett – bass guitar
- Bob Cuff – rhythm guitar, backing vocals
- John Luby – drums, backing vocals
- Larry West – lead guitar
- John Gregory – lead guitar, backing vocals

== Discography ==
=== Single ===
- "Johnny Was a Good Boy" b/w "House on the Hill" – (1967) Verve single No. 10499

=== Album ===
- So Glad I Found You – (1999) Ace/Big Beat Records [UK]

== Bibliography ==
- Palao, Alec (2007). Love Is The Song We Sing: San Francisco Nuggets 1965–1970 (section: "Feed Your Head: Track-By-Track Commentary). Rhino Entertainment Company.
