= Garage Beat '66 Volume 2: Chicks are for Kids! =

Compilation album
- Released: April 27, 2004
- Recorded: 1960s
- Genre: Garage rock; psychedelic; folk rock
- Length: 54:15
- Label: Sundazed

chronology
Garage Beat '66 Volume 1: Like What, Me Worry?! (2004)	Garage Beat '66 Volume 2: Chicks are for Kids! (2004)	Garage Beat '66 Volume 3: Feeling Zero... (2004)

Garage Beat '66 Volume 2: Chicks are for Kids! is the second installment in the Garage Beat 66 series of garage rock compilations issued by Sundazed Music, which was released on April 27, 2004 and is available exclusively on compact disc. It features well-researched liner notes, written by Ugly Things publisher Mike Stax, which supply background information about each song and act, usually including photographs of the bands. Like all of the entries in the series it is noted for good sound quality, as all of the tracks are mastered from the original studio master sources.

The set opens with "Sweetgina," by the Things to Come. Also featured is The Guess Who's 1966 single, "Believe Me." The Remains perform a rough alternate take of "Why Do I Cry." The Barbarians deliver their Mersey Beat influenced debut 45, "Hey Little Bird." The Litter, do aversion of the Small Faces' Whacha Gonna do About It? Also on the set is The Five Americans 1964 single, "I'm Feeling O.K." The Spiders (featuring Vincent Furnier, later known as Alice Cooper) play a fuzz-drenched outtake of "Don't Blow Your Mind." Seattle's the Sonics perform "You've Got Your Head on Backwards." Some of the lesser-known songs are the Bold's lewd "Gotta Get Some" and the Go-Betweens' "Have You for My Own." The Jynx, whose roster included future Big Star member Chris Bell on lead guitar, do a rendition of Them's "Little Girl." The Ugly Ducklings close out the set with their unreleased version of Bo Diddley's "I'm a Man."

== Track listing ==
1. Things to Come: "Sweetgina" (Steve Runolfsson) 3:00
2. The Bold: "Gotta Get Some" (Dick Lapalm) 2:30
3. The Guess Who: "Believe Me" (Randy Bachman) 2:54
4. The Jynx: "Little Girl" (Van Morrison) 1:55
5. The Gestures: "I'm Not Mad" 2:37
6. Menn: "Things to Come" 2:07
7. The Sonics: "You Got Your Head on Backwards" (Gerald Roslie) 2:22
8. Best Things: "Chicks Are for Kids" 3:08
9. The Remains: "Why Do I Cry" (Barry Tashian) 3:07
10. The Barbarians: "Hey Little Bird" (Tommy Kaye) 2:21
11. The More-Tishans "(I've Got) Nowhere to Run" 2:09
12. The Concepts: "Faces Come, Feelings Go" (Rob Zolner) 2:50
13. The Go-Betweens: "Have You for My Own" (Bob Brancati) 2:29
14. The Litter: "Whatcha Gonna Do About It?" 2:27
15. The Electras: "(Just a Little) Soul Searchin'" (Warren Kendrick) 2:46
16. The Five Americans: "I'm Feeling O.K." (Johnny Durrill/Michael Rabon) 2:19
17. The Spiders: "Don't Blow Your Mind" 2:53
18. The Third Bardo: "Lose Your Mind" (R. Evans) 2:14
19. We the People: "When I Arrive" (Tommy Talton) 3:05
20. The Ugly Ducklings: "I'm a Man (Ellas McDaniel) 5:02

== Catalogue and release information ==
- Compact disc (SC 11140)
