= I Still Love You (The Vejtables song) =

Single by The Vejtables
- B-side: "Anything"
- Released: 1965
- Recorded: 1965
- Genre: Folk rock
- Length: 2:22
- Label: Autumn
- Songwriter(s): Jan Errico

The Vejtables singles chronology
| "I Still Love You" (1965) | "The Last Thing on My Mind" (1966) |

"I Still Love You" is a song by the American folk rock band the Vejtables, written by Jan Errico, and first appears on the group's debut single, which was released on Autumn Records in 1965 (see 1965 in music). The Vejtables were signed to the record label after receiving some regional notice on the nightclub circuit, despite all the band members still being enrolled in high school. "I Still Love You" exhibits influences from their label-mates the Beau Brummels, though it is largely marked by its jangling 12-string guitar arrangements, folky vocal harmonies, and sparse use of the harmonica. Arguably the Vejtables' greatest asset was Errico, who not only penned the song, but also played drums, making her one of the few 1960s female musicians to do so. Upon release, "I Still Love You" reached number 83 on the Billboard Hot 100, becoming the only Vejtables release to crack the chart. The song charted quite respectably in Chicago. It debuted on the 10th of September, and 3 weeks in the charts, finally peaking at number 23 on the 24th of that month.

The song was later featured on the compilation albums Nuggets, Volume 7: Early San Francisco, San Francisco Nights, Feel... the Vejtables, which also compiles all of the band's recordings, and San Francisco Roots.
