= Tripsichord Music Box =

American psychedelic rock band group in the 1960s

- Origin: San Francisco, California
- Genres: Psychedelic rock
- Years active: 1968–1971
- Labels: San Francisco Sound, Janus
- Members: Randy Gordon; Frank Straight; Dave Zandonatti; Oliver McKinney; Bill Carr; Ron McNeely

The Tripsichord Music Box was an American psychedelic rock group of the 1960s. They were managed by Matthew Katz, who also worked with Jefferson Airplane, Moby Grape and It's a Beautiful Day. Their loyalty to Katz, at a time when many San Francisco bands were signing recording deals with Los Angeles-based labels, may have contributed to their relatively unknown status today. Led by guitarist and singer/songwriter David Zandonatti, Tripsichord recorded a full-length LP and several singles for Katz's San Francisco Sound label. They were the first San Francisco group to record on 8-track equipment.

Frank Straight (guitar), Tony McGuire (guitar), Oliver McKinney (keyboards) and Randy Guzman (drums), performing as The Ban and based in Lompoc, California, released one 45 RPM single ("Bye-Bye" / "That I'm Hoping") in 1965 on a small label called Brent records. McGuire was drafted into the military, and circa 1966 Zandonatti joined The Ban, originally as a bassist. They then moved to Los Angeles, signed to Jack Berle's Embassy record label, changed their name to The Now, played some Sunset Strip clubs, and released a single on Embassy, "I Want" / "Fly Like a Bird". Soon they moved to San Francisco and signed up to be managed by Matthew Katz, who came up with the name Tripsichord Music Box.

Around 1969, Zandonatti converted to the Church of Jesus Christ of Latter-day Saints (LDS Church), which became an influence on songs he wrote, some of which appeared on the band's LP. Tripsichord's other songwriter, Bill Carr, is Jewish and as Zandonatti was the only committed Mormon in the band, they were never a "Mormon band".

Toward the end of their stay in San Francisco, Ron McNeely joined as vocalist and, when Tripsichord Music Box folded, Zandonatti, Straight and McNeely moved to Utah and formed a band named Free Spirit. Straight departed soon after, leaving Zandonatti and McNeely to get involved in the Sons of Mosiah, more of a troupe than a band.

Next, Zandonatti, Guzman, Dennis MacGregor and Danny Coletti formed Natty Bumppo, which relocated to Los Angeles. Zandonatti stayed with them until 1981/82; he now lives in Oregon.

Italian re-issue label Akarma later released a 2-LP re-issue of the Tripsichord Music Box LP. The tracks on the four sides are:-

Side 1 - On The Last Ride, We Have Passed Away, Black Door, The New Word.
Side 2 - Son Of The Morning, Short Order Steward, The Narrow Gate.
Side 3 - Fly Baby, Everlasting Joy (All the preceding tracks are from the Janus LP). You're The Woman, It's Not Good.
Side 4 - Family Song (The preceding three tracks originally appeared on the San Francisco Fifth Pipe Dream compilation LP). Times And Seasons, Sunday The Third (both sides of the San Francisco Sound #115 single).

In 2012, Kismet released a CD with the same lineup as the Arkama 2-LP set, and with extensive liner notes.

== Members ==
- Randy Guzman—drums
- Frank Straight—guitar
- Dave Zandonatti—bass
- Oliver McKinney—keyboards and organ
- Bill Carr—vocals
- Ron McNeely-vocals

== Discography ==
=== Albums ===
- Tripsichord Music Box LP (San Francisco Sound 1970), released as Tripsichord by Tripsichord on Janus Records (Janus J.L.S. 3016) in 1971. Reissued several times, e.g. on Akarma and Trading Places, with bonus tracks.

=== Singles/EPs ===
- The Ban
  - "Bye-Bye" / "That I'm Hoping" 1965
- The Now
  - "I Want" / "Fly Like a Bird" (Embassy 1968) 1967
- Tripsichord Music Box
  - "Times and Seasons" / "Sunday the Third" (San Francisco Sound 115) 1969
  - "We Have Died" / "Fly Baby" (San Francisco Sound 127) 1971

=== Compilation tracks ===
- "You’re the Woman" / "It’s Not Good" / "Family Song" - San Francisco Sound compilation (Fifth Pipe Dream (F.P.D. 11680)) 1969
- "You're the Woman" / "Fly Baby" - Then And Now, Vol. 1, (San Francisco Sound (SFS-03931))
- "Family Song" / "On the Last Ride" - Then And Now, Vol. 2, (San Francisco Sound (SFS-09932))
