= The Basement Wall =

American garage rock band

- From left to right: Barrie Edgar, Terry Bourdier, Richard Lipscomb, and George Ratzlaff.

Background information
- Origin: Baton Rouge, Louisiana, United States
- Genres: Garage rock; psychedelic rock
- Years active: 1963–1968
- Label: Senate
- Past members: Terry Bourdier; Richard Lipscomb; Barrie Edgar; George Ratzlaff; Duke Bardwell

The Basement Wall was an American garage rock band from Baton Rouge, Louisiana, who were active in the 1960s. The group spent much of their career touring in Texas, and eventually became among the most recognized live acts in the southern regional rock scene. All of the band's recorded material was featured on a compilation album in 1985. In 2005, they briefly reunited with their original members for a concert to mark the occasion of their induction into the Louisiana Entertainment Hall of Fame.

== History ==
The Basement Wall formed in 1963 by founding members Terry Bourdier (bass guitar, vocals) Richard Lipscomb (lead guitar), and Barrie Edgar (drums). Although the band originated from Baton Rouge, Louisiana, they performed primarily in Eastern Texas, honing their skills with cover songs, and drawing influence from the British Invasion groups, particularly the Beatles and the Rolling Stones. With the subsequent addition of George Ratzlaff (lead vocals, rhythm guitar) the Basement Wall expanded beyond local frat house concerts to popular teen nightclubs as far as Los Angeles, even becoming the highest-paid cover band in the southern U.S., according to the Louisiana Entertainment Association. A live performance by the group in 1967 at a venue in Texas called Act III is featured on the compilation album There Goes the Neighborhood, Volume 2, which showcases the Basement Wall's raw vocal harmonic and fuzz-toned guitar interpretations of popular songs including "Pretty Ballerina", "Let's Spend the Night Together", and "Eleanor Rigby".

In 1967, the band signed to Senate Records and began writing their own original material. The group entered Robin Hood Studio in Tyler, Texas to record several demos, including their lone single, a byproduct of the Texas garage rock scene, the Ratzlaff-penned "Never Existed". The recording sessions were produced by Wes Farrell, who composed the McCoys' number one hit "Hang On Sloopy", and the guitar arrangements were provided by Ronnie "Mouse" Weiss of Mouse and the Traps. Its B-side "Taste of a Kiss" was another Ratzlaff composition is a pop rock number marked by up-tempo keyboards. The single became a regional hit upon release in June 1967, and an album was supposedly released; however, there is little evidence to support its existence. Regardless, much of the Basement Wall's material was released on The Incredible Sound of the Basement Wall in 1985 on Cicadelic Records.

In 1968, Bourdier retired from the music industry after getting married. Although the group did replace him with Duke Bardwell, who later toured with Elvis Presley, they could not recapture the chemistry and disbanded later in the year. Ratzlaff resurfaced with the blues rock outfit Potliquor, scoring a national hit with the song "Cheer" in 1972. Since its initial release, "Never Existed" has been reissued on Boulders, Volume 10, Relics, Volume 1, and Relics, Volume 2. An alternate version of the song appears on Garage Beat '66 Volume 5: Readin' Your Will. In 2005, the Basement Wall held a reunion concert with the original lineup in honor of their induction into the Louisiana Entertainment Hall of Fame.

== Membership ==
- Richard Lipscombe – lead guitar, sitar, vocals
- Terry Bourdier – bass guitar
- George Ratzlaff – lead vocals, rhythm guitar, keyboards
- Barrie Edgar – drums
- Duke Bardwell – bass guitar

== Discography ==
- "Never Existed" b/w "Taste of a Kiss" (Senate S-2109, June 1967)
