= Jan Errico =

American drummer

- Also known as: Jan Ashton, Janet Errico
- Instrument: Drums
- Years active: 1960s – ?
- Formerly of: The Vejtables, The Mojo Men

Jan Errico is a drummer and singer who was a member of two San Francisco rock groups in the 1960s, The Vejtables and The Mojo Men.

== Background ==
Errico is the daughter of Vincent Errico who, himself was an accomplished drummer. She is the cousin of Greg Errico, the original drummer for Sly and the Family Stone. It has been written that she changed her name from Errico to Ashton to sound more British.

Female drummers in rock bands in that era were rather rare.

== Career ==
In 1962 or 1963, when she was around age 12, she recorded the single "It Was A Lie" (bw "Come Along With Me") for the Shelby Records label. The backing group was credited as The Twilights, who were really Joe Piazza and the Continentals.

By 1964, she was a member of The Vejtables, both singing backup and playing drums. While with the Vejtables she contributed to a good part of their written material including their minor hit, "I Still Love You", which she sang lead on. By November 13, 1965 the song had spent four weeks in the charts, eventually reaching no 84. She also sang lead on the group's take of Tom Paxton's "The Last Thing on My Mind".

It appears that at some stage in 1966, there may have been a brief change of direction for her in attempting a solo career. A single "Cold Dreary Morning"/"Smile, Smile, Smile" was recorded but Autumn Records never released it.

Errico joined the Mojo Men around spring 1966, replacing the band's drummer Dennis DeCarr. In 1967, she and the band recorded 20 songs in one day at Coast Recorders.

The last single released by the group then known as The Mojo was "Everyday Love" bw There Goes My Mind in 1970.

== Solo discography ==
List
Title	Credited artist	Release	Label	Year	Notes
"It Was A Lie"	Janet Errico	"It Was A Lie" / "Come Along With Me"	Shelby Records (C-45-2C)	(c) 1962/1963	
"Smile, Smile, Smile"	The Vejtables	Feel... The Vejtables	Sundazed Music SC 11031	1995	
"Cold Dreary Morning"	The Vejtables	Feel... The Vejtables	Sundazed Music SC 11031	1995	
