= Garage Beat '66 Volume 5: Readin' Your Will =

Compilation album
- Released: June 21, 2005
- Recorded: 1960s
- Genre: Garage rock; psychedelic
- Length: 55:12
- Label: Sundazed

chronology
Garage Beat '66 Volume 4: I'm in Need! (2008)	Garage Beat '66 Volume 5: Readin' Your Will (2005)	Garage Beat '66 Volume 6: Speak of the Devil... (2000)

Garage Beat '66 Volume 5: Readin' Your Will is the fifth installment in the Garage Beat 66 series of garage rock compilations issued by Sundazed Music, which is available exclusively on compact disc. This volume was released on June 21, 2005 and consists of a mixture of raw up-tempo numbers as well as some psychedelic. Like all of the entries in the series, which is noted for good sound quality, all of the tracks are mastered from the original studio master sources and contain well-researched liner notes written by knowledgeable authorities. Volume 5 is mentioned by AllMusic as perhaps the best collection in the series.

The set begins with "Story of My Life", performed by Taylor, Michigan's The Unrelated Segments, featuring slashing guitars and Ron Stults' characteristically passionate delivery on vocals. The set also features "Face to Face" by The Zakary Thaks, from Corpus Christi, Texas. The Thingies' "I'm Going Ahead" is one of the compilation's gentler numbers. "No More," by The Morning Dew from Topeka, Kansas is culled from an alternate take, which has a slightly brisker tempo than the officially-released version on the Fairyland Records single. The Headstones perform "Bad Day Blues" and The Beefeaters play "Don't Hurt Me." The Heart Beats, an all-female group does a rendition of "Little Latin Lupe Lu." The set concludes with The Tidal Waves' "Action! (Speaks Louder Than Words)."

== Track listing ==
1. The Unrelated Segments: "Story of My Life" 2:40
2. The Liberty Bell: "I Can See" 3:06
3. The Lemon Drops: "It Happens Everyday" 2:17
4. The Headstones: "Bad Day Blues" 2:53
5. The Beefeaters: "Don't Hurt Me" 2:52
6. The Thingies: "I'm Going Ahead" 2:16
7. The Bad Seeds: "A Taste of the Same" 2:43
8. The Front Page: "News Thoughts" 3:08
9. The Human Expression: "Readin' Your Will" 2:46
10. The Zakary Thaks: "Face to Face" 2:59
11. The Knight's Bridge: "Make Me Some Love" 3:04
12. The Nuchez: "Open Up Your Mind" 3:07
13. The Basement Wall: "Never Existed" 2:00
14. The Human Expression: "Optical Sound" 2:37
15. Plato & The Philosophers: "Thirteen O'Clock Flight to Psychedelphia" 3:02
16. Silk Winged Alliance: "Flashback" 3:06
17. The Morning Dew: "No More" (alternate take) 2:47
18. The Arkay IV: "Little Girl" 2:49
19. The Heart Beats: "Little Latin Lupe Lu" 2:10
20. The Tidal Waves: "Action! (Speaks Louder Than Words)" 3:01

== Catalogue and release information ==
- Compact disc (SC 11151)
