= Garage Beat '66 (series) =

Compilation album series by Various Artists
- Released: 2004–2007
- Genre: Garage rock; psychedelic rock; pop
- Label: Sundazed

Garage Beat '66! is a series of garage rock compilation albums issued by Sundazed Music. The series currently consists of seven CDs (Volumes 1–7), each of which is officially designated by its volume number, which appears in the upper left-hand corner of the front cover, and a corresponding "catch phrase" title, which appears as a subheading under the large Garage Beat '66 logo below. The Garage Beat '66 series attempts to represent the breadth and variety of the genre, including not only rawer hard-rocking numbers, but also songs displaying folk rock and psychedelic influence, as well as pop. All of the currently existing installments were released between 2004 and 2007. The series is recognized for good sound quality: all of the song selections were mastered from the original studio source elements. All of the volumes follow the packaging format employed by other garage compilation series such as Pebbles. Each volume includes detailed and fully researched liner notes, which include biographical sketches about each song and group, as well as other information such as origin and recording date, as well as photographs of the bands.

== Discography ==
- Garage Beat '66 Volume 1: Like What, Me Worry?! (SC 11139)
- Garage Beat '66 Volume 2: Chicks are for Kids! (SC 11140)
- Garage Beat '66 Volume 3: Feeling Zero... (SC 11141)
- Garage Beat '66 Volume 4: I'm in Need! (SC 11150)
- Garage Beat '66 Volume 5: Readin' Your Will (SC 11151)
- Garage Beat '66 Volume 6: Speak of the Devil... (SC 11186)
- Garage Beat '66 Volume 7: That's How It Will Be! (SC 11187)
