= Country Weather =

American psychedelic rock band

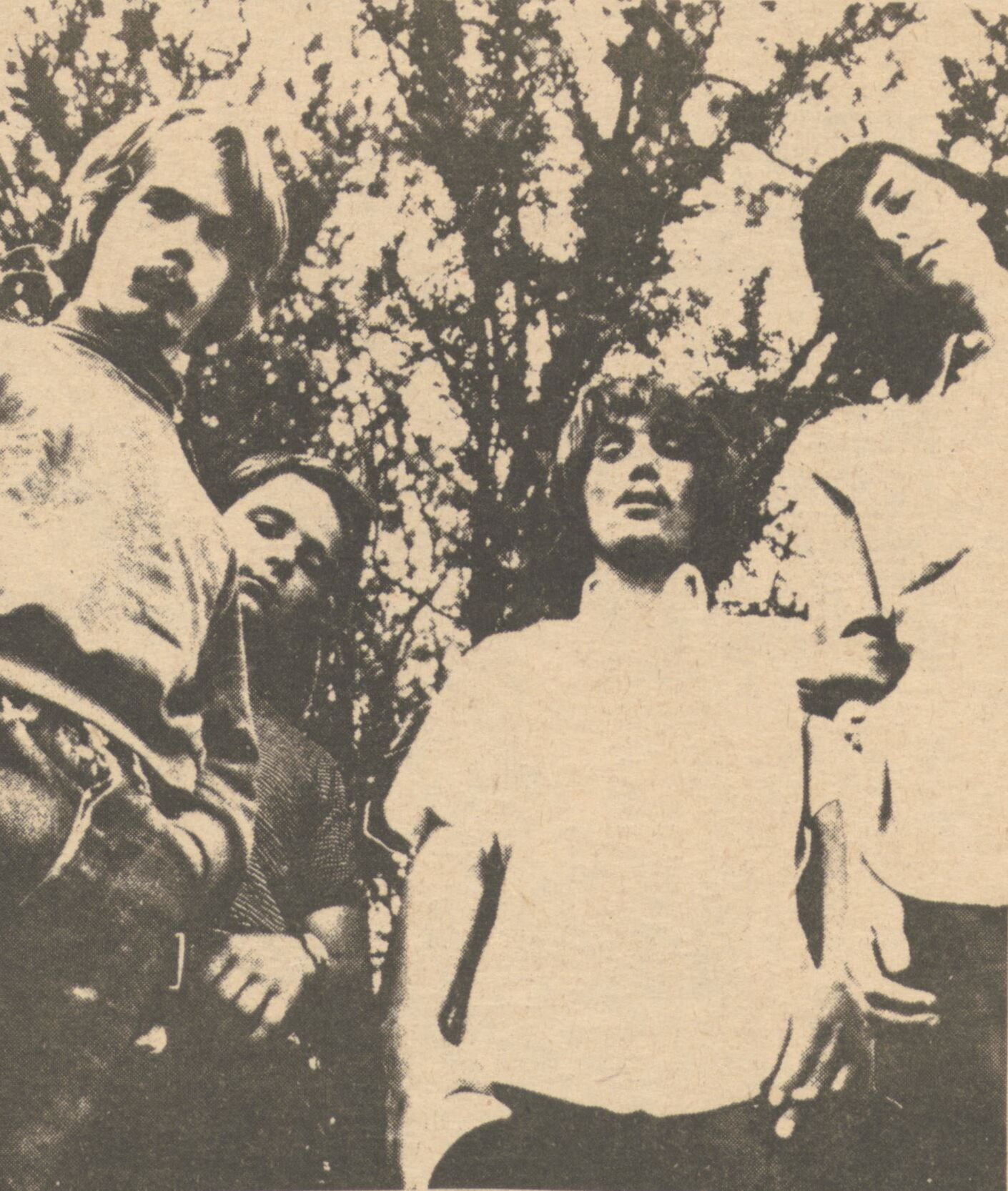
- Country Weather, 1968

Background information
- Origin: Walnut Creek, California, United States
- Genres: Psychedelic rock
- Years active: 1966–1973; 2000–present
- Label: RD
- Members: Dave Carter; Steve Derr; Graham Cooper; Lloyd Ferris
- Past members: Greg Douglass; Bill Baron; Paul White; Craig T. Nelson
- Website: Official website

Country Weather is an American psychedelic rock band that were closely associated with the San Francisco music scene of the late 1960s.

Originally named The Virtues, the band was formed in the San Francisco suburb of Walnut Creek, California, by high school students Dave Carter (vocals, bass), Denny Rogan (lead guitar) and Steve Derr (vocals, rhythm guitar) in 1966. They were initially joined by Paul White and Craig T. Nelson, who were soon replaced by Greg Douglass (lead guitar) and Bill Baron (drums).

== Career ==
In 1967, the band changed their name to Country Weather, at the suggestion of San Francisco music promoter Chet Helms. Chet also suggested that the band stop playing cover versions and concentrate on writing their own original material. Soon after, they began opening for various psychedelic bands at key counter-culture venues in San Francisco, including the Avalon Ballroom, the Fillmore Auditorium, and Winterland.

Although Country Weather never signed to a major record label or released any singles or albums during their 1960s heyday, they did record a five-song promotional demo in 1969 to help them get gigs. 50 copies of this demo record were produced (making it a much sought-after rarity among collectors) and it received considerable airplay on local radio stations.

Country Weather disbanded in 1973 when Greg Douglass left the band to join Mistress. Later he joined the Steve Miller Band and has also played as a sideman to established artists, including Van Morrison. Dave Carter went on to play with Quicksilver Messenger Service and also played with former Moby Grape member, Skip Spence.

The group reformed in 2000, for a benefit show to help raise funds for a liver transplant for a friend of the band. The result was a full reformation, with Greg Douglass and Bill Baron being replaced by Graham Cooper (guitar), and Lloyd Ferris (drums).

The band released their first CD in 2003, entitled Makin' Music Again. This 13 track CD featured new and vintage songs, including a recording of "Yes That's Right" taken from a Fillmore Auditorium show in July 1969. In 2005, a double vinyl LP entitled Country Weather was released by RD Records. This double album featured the band's 1969 five song demo, previously unreleased live recordings from summer 1970 and a studio session from 1971.

In 2007, the band's signature song, "Fly to New York", appeared on Rhino Records’ Love Is the Song We Sing: San Francisco Nuggets 1965–1970 compilation, which was nominated for a Grammy Award in the historical category. When Rolling Stone magazine reviewed the album for their October edition, they cited "Fly to New York" as a "great freakout". In February 2009, Country Weather released a three-song demo CD recorded in 2008 and 2009, which included a new recording of "Fly to New York".

== Discography ==
=== Albums ===
- Makin' Music Again (2003)
- Country Weather (2005)

=== EPs ===
- 3 Song Demo (2009)
