= Neal Ford and the Fanatics =

Background information
- Origin: Houston, Texas, United States
- Genres: Psychedelic rock; garage rock
- Years active: 1964–1970
- Labels: Gina; Tantara; Hickory
- Past members: Neal Ford; Johnny Stringfellow; Jon Pereles; W. T. Johnson; Dennis Senter; Steven Ames; Lanier Greig

Neal Ford and the Fanatics were an American psychedelic rock band formed in Houston Texas, in 1964. Led by Neal Ford and featuring members who were all capable songwriters, the band was a forerunner in the development of psychedelic music in the region, along with their contemporaries, The 13th Floor Elevators and the Moving Sidewalks. The group released one album in 1967 before disbanding later in 1970.

== History ==
In the end of 1964, Neal Ford (lead vocals), a veteran of the local pop scene with other groups like the Ramadas and the VIPs, formed the first line-up of Neal Ford and the Fanatics, which consisted of Johnny Stringfellow (lead guitar), Jon Pereles (rhythm guitar, vocals), W. T. Johnson (bass guitar), Dennis Senter (keyboards), and John Cravey (drums). Though not as experimental as their contemporary, The 13th Floor Elevators, the band possessed an appreciation for the British Invasion groups, emphasized organ-driven instrumentals, and a R&B-inspired rhythm atypical of other garage rock acts. At first, the group went relatively unnoticed performing cover versions of songs by The Animals, The Zombies, and James Brown locally in their own club named Teen Scene, until record producer Ray Rush saw promise in the developing band, specifically their spontaneous live act. As a result, Neal Ford and the Fanatics recorded the song "I Will Not Be Lonely" at ACA-Recording Studios, and released the single in May 1965 on GINA records. The single was among the first in Texas to note "British influence", received airplay in Houston, and managed to reach the regional charts.

Shortly thereafter, Ford was called up from the Naval Reserve, and, until late-1965, the band's recording activities were at a standstill. Upon Ford's return, Senter was replaced by Steven Ames (né Stephen Charles Ames; born 1947), while his older brother, Richard "Dick" Ames (né Richard Curtis Ames; 1940–2008), created Tantara Records to release the group's second single, the folk rock tune, "Bitter Bells", in January 1966. Through the summer of 1966, Neal Ford and the Fanatics profile rose steadily, with extensive airplay in Houston, multiple appearances on the Larry Kane Show, and well-attended shows at a venue called the Catacombs alongside nationally successful acts including The Beach Boys and The Lovin' Spoonful. Ford recalls, "We got a tremendous amount of exposure. It was a good time to be playing rock and roll music. It was the last time that radio stations could really help local groups and accentuate the talent that was in the area."

By the summer of 1966, Ames departed the band to pursue a management position for the group, The Moving Sidewalks. He was replaced by Vox organ virtuoso Lanier Greig, who created a new sound for the band and collaborated with the members to pen more original compositions. In October 1966, Neal Ford and the Fanatics recorded demos of songs including "I Can't Go On" and "Good Men", among others, to earn a contract with the national label, Hickory Records. The only non-original song recorded during the sessions was a radical take on The Zombies', "Woman". Two regionally successful singles followed with "I Will If You Want To" receiving national attention in September 1966, and "Gonna Be My Girl" reaching number one in Houston in early 1967. Their debut album, Neal Ford and the Fanatics was released soon after. However, their next single, "Wait for Me" failed to produce the national breakthrough the group anticipated, and none of their later offerings in 1968 met the same acclaim as "Gonna Be My Girl". The band continued to perform on the local club circuit but in 1969 Ford quit and eventually produced a solo album in 1971. More songs without Ford were recorded but not distributed and in October 1970 the group disbanded.

In 2013, Ace Records (United Kingdom) released "Good Men," a compilation focusing on the group's more rocking sides. In 2019, Chunk Archives Recordings released "Every Night a New Surprise," with garage rock veteran Mal Thursday adding vocals and harmonica to a previously unfinished Neal Ford and The Fanatics backing track from 1966.

Lanier Greig (born August 20, 1948, in Houston, Texas) died on February 15, 2013, at age 64.

Neal Ford died on May 17, 2021. No cause of death was given, but he had been fighting complications of COVID-19 for several months. He was 78.
