= Public Nuisance =

American rock band

Background information
- Origin: Sacramento, California, United States
- Genres: Garage rock; folk rock; psychedelic rock; protopunk; hard rock
- Years active: 1964-1970
- Labels: Icon; Chattahoochee; Equinox; Fantastic
- Past members: David Houston; Jim Mathews; Pat Minter; Ron McMaster

Public Nuisance was an American rock band from Sacramento, California who were active from 1964 to 1970, first as Moss & the Rocks, then later as Public Nuisance. In 1965 they recorded the song "There She Goes" as Moss & the Rocks for a single released on the local Icon label (later re-recorded in 1966 for Chattahoochee Records). After changing their name to Public Nuisance in 1967, they began to incorporate psychedelic elements into their sound and a series of mostly unreleased songs recorded at various sessions from 1968 to 1969 that went unissued for years, but finally saw the light of day in 2002 with the release of the Gotta Survive anthology. Since then, their work, both as Moss & the Rocks and Public Nuisance, has attracted the attention of garage rock and psychedelic enthusiasts worldwide.

== History ==
Public Nuisance formed in Sacramento in 1964 as an instrumental surf rock band called the Jaguars. After the musical British Invasion and folk rock movements of the mid-1960s they added vocals and changed their name to Moss & the Rocks. Their lineup consisted of David Houston, their principal songwriter, on guitar, keyboards, harmonica, and vocals, Jim Mathews on guitar, Pat Minter on bass and vocals, and Ron McMaster on drums and vocals. Even while known as the Jaguars, the group were known for their stage antics. David Houston sometimes smashed his guitar on stage, and the group wore hairstyles that were considered long for 1964.

The group's manager was Gary Schiro, who had connections in Los Angeles and managed two other local bands, the New Breed and the Oxford Circle. Moss & the Rocks won a battle of the bands contest and were able to gain free recording time at Ikon Studios, a small label in Sacramento, which hosted numerous garage bands in the area. As Moss & the Rocks they recorded the folk rock-influenced single, "There She Goes" b/w "Please Come Back," released on Ikon. The session was engineered by Eirik Wangberg, who was from Norway. Later that year, they re-recorded both tunes for a single released on Chattahoochee Records. In 1967 they changed their name to Public Nuisance. In early 1968 the band recorded a series of demos which for years remained unreleased. These recordings saw the group augment their raw garage rock sound with experimental psychedelic elements. Their lyrics, when not exploring more conventional love themes, saw the band engaging in social commentary that addressed topical concerns of the era.

They became a popular live act throughout much of California during this period and opened for the Doors, Buffalo Springfield, Sonny & Cher, as well as the Grateful Dead. Later in 1968, they taped several demos at Fantasy Records in San Francisco, but were not signed to the label. Eventually Gary Schiro arranged a contract with Equinox records, a label run by producer Terry Melcher, who was noted for his work with the Byrds and Paul Revere & the Raiders. The label was distributed though ABC/Dunhill. At the end of 1968 and the beginning of 1969, they commuted to-and-from Los Angeles, where they recorded an album's worth of songs. However, like their previous outings, none of the recordings saw release—in this case because producer Terry Melcher, who had sub-letted houses to director Roman Polanski and Dennis Wilson of the Beach Boys, became emotionally distraught after Polanski's wife Sharon Tate was murdered by Charles Manson. Melcher chose to terminate recording commitments he had made with Wilson for Equinox because Wilson had socialized with the Manson family; Melcher closed down the label. Public Nuisance soldiered on and played gigs including several shows at the Fillmore West in San Francisco, but disbanded in 1970.

Guitarist David Houston went on to become a producer and played keyboards with the new wave band the Twinkeyz in the late 1970s before going on to produce records by Steel Breeze and Club Nouveau. Bassist Pat Minter died in 1994.

Public Nuisance went for years virtually unknown to all but a select few, but in 2002 their complete recordings were compiled by Frantic Records on the double-CD Gotta Survive anthology, which also included their tracks recorded as Moss & the Rocks for Ikon and Chattahoochee. Moss & the Rocks' "There She Goes" "Please Come Back" were issued on the CD compilation, The Ikon Records Story - America's #1 Unsung Garage Label 1964-1966, put out by Frantic Records in 2015 and "There She Goes" appears on Garage Beat '66 Volume 3: Feeling Zero....

== Membership ==
- David Houston (guitar, keyboards, harmonica, vocals)
- Jim Mathews (guitar)
- Pat Minter (bass, vocals)
- Ron McMaster (drums, vocals)

== Discography ==
=== Singles (as Moss & the Rocks) ===
- "There She Goes" b/w "Please Come Back" (Ikon 181/182, 1965)
- "There She Goes" b/w "Please Come Back" (Chattahoochee 703, January 1966)

=== Anthology ===
- Gotta Survive (Frantic 2002)
