= Butch Engle & the Styx =

American rock band

- Also known as: The Showmen, The Styx
- Origin: Mill Valley, California, United States
- Genres: Pop rock, folk rock, garage rock
- Years active: 1963–1968
- Past members: Butch Engle; Rob Zamora; Mike Pardee; Harry "Happiness" Smith; Rich Morrison; Larry Gerughty; Barry Lewis

Butch Engle & the Styx was an American rock band formed in 1963 in Mill Valley, California. Originally named The Showmen, the members were Butch Engle (vocals), Bob Zamora (lead guitar), Mike Pardee (organ), Harry "Happiness" Smith (bass), and Rich Morrison (drums). The band released three singles before breaking up in 1968. A compilation album featuring all of the band's recordings, No Matter What You Say: The Best of Butch Engle & the Styx, was released in 2000.

== History ==
Butch Engle formed The Showmen—not to be confused with the 1960s pop group of the same name— in 1963 after he took over and renamed an earlier incarnation of the band, whose roster had included Bill Champlin. The group consisted of Engle, guitarist Bob Zamora, organist Mike Pardee, bassist Harry "Happiness" Smith, and drummer Rich Morrison. In 1964 the Showmen released the British Invasion-influenced single "You Know All I Want". The band changed their name in 1965 to Butch Engle & the Styx. With the exception of their debut single, all material recorded by the band was written or co-written by Ron Elliott of The Beau Brummels. According to Engle, "Ron, Sly Stewart [later known as Sly Stone], [and Autumn Records executives] Tom Donahue and Bobby Mitchell would choose which songs would go on [a Beau Brummels] album, and then we could take what we wanted from whatever was left". Butch Engle & the Styx released a single, "I'm a Girl", in 1966 on the Warner Bros. Records subsidiary, Loma Records. The band shortened their name to The Styx and released another single, "Hey, I'm Lost", in 1967, before breaking up the following year. In 2000, Sundazed Music released No Matter What You Say: The Best of Butch Engle & the Styx, a compilation album which contained the band's three singles—including B-sides—along with 11 previously unreleased recordings. "Hey, I'm Lost" appeared on the 2007 Love Is the Song We Sing: San Francisco Nuggets 1965–1970 box set.

== Critical reception ==
Author and music journalist Richie Unterberger noted the two songs that comprised the band's first single were "performed rather sloppily", and called the Elliott-composed material "weak by Elliott's own high standards and in fact were basically leftovers that were not deemed strong enough for the Beau Brummels to record". Unterberger said Butch Engle & the Styx were "lesser musicians and singers than the Beau Brummels, too". He named "Hey, I'm Lost" as the band's highlight, describing the song as "a charging, slightly ominous and doubtful number with good vocal harmonies.

== Band members ==
- Butch Engle – lead vocals
- Bob Zamora – lead guitar
- Mike Pardee – organ
- Harry "Happiness" Smith – bass
- Rich Morrison – drums
- Larry Gerughty – keyboards
- Barry Lewis – (Drums and Percussion) 1967–68

== Discography ==
=== Compilation album ===
Year	Album details
2000	No Matter What You Say: The Best of Butch Engle & the Styx: Release date: November 14, 2000; Label: Sundazed Music

=== Singles ===
Year	Song
1964	"You Know All I Want": B-side: "Tell Me Please"; Label: MEA (4505); Recorded as The Showmen
1966	"I Like Her": B-side: "Going Home"; Label: Loma (2065); Recorded as Butch Engle & the Styx
1967	"Hey, I'm Lost": B-side: "Puppetmaster"; Label: Onyx (2200); Recorded as The Styx
