= Stained Glass (band) =

American pop rock band

Stained Glass was an American pop rock band from San Jose, California.

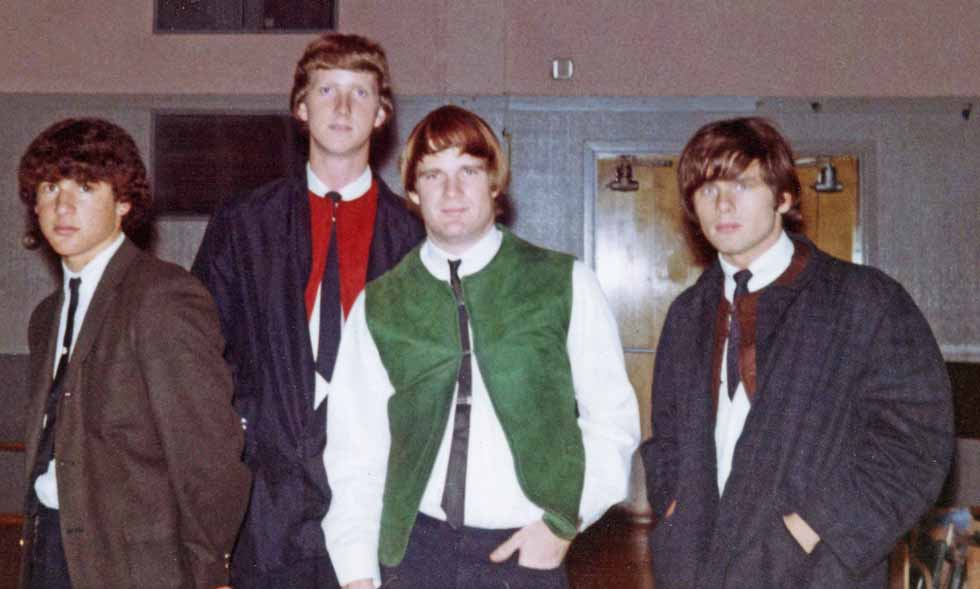
Trolls in 1965, became Stained Glass when signed with RCA. L to R: Dennis Carrasco, Bob Rominger, Roger Hedge, Jim McPherson

The band was formed in 1964 by guitarist Roger Hedge with bass player Jim McPherson, guitarist Bob Rominger, and drummer Dennis Carrasco. The band was initially named "The Trolls." All four members were vocalists, and, for its time, the group had an impressive vocal capability. This enabled them not only to sing accurate covers, but to create unique and melodic vocal arrangements on original material, setting them apart from most of their competition. Hedge put the group together, invested personal funds for equipment and promotion, and was the leader and business manager for the first couple of years. They performed in and around the San Jose area, releasing on their own, a McPherson tune, "Walkin' Shoes" which sold out in a matter of weeks in San Jose.

They were soon scouted by an A&R man from RCA, and subsequently signed to that label towards the end of 1966.

Their early material was written mostly by McPherson, some written by Hedge, some by Rominger, with Carrasco co-writing a few. The songs were partially a mixture of rock, folk, blues, and Merseybeat, but had a distinctive original sound they planned to exploit for long careers. Some of their recordings met with minor success in northern California.

RCA changed their band name to "Stained Glass". They had them record a Beatles tune, "If I Needed Someone", that was thought would not be released by the Beatles in the US. The record got enough play in late 1966 to justify a short tour of the East Coast a while later, with the group playing a few gigs, and doing some recording at the RCA studios in New York City. However, The Beatles released the track on their own album, Yesterday and Today which slowed the sales of the Stained Glass version.

In April 1967, the band scored a big hit record in San Jose with "We Got A Long Way To Go," written by Barry Mann and Cynthia Weil. Later that year, Hedge was removed from the band for differences in musical direction. Their recording contract was taken over by Capitol in early 1968, issuing three singles, one of which was the non-LP song "Lady In Lace", written by McPherson and backed by "Soap and Turkey (on a Pyramid)" written by Rominger. An LP, Crazy Horse Roads, was released in 1968, and had some controversial album art, in what appeared to be a photograph of the three of them all hanging by the neck from the branch of a tall tree.

In 1969, Rominger was replaced by Tom Bryant for musical differences. A second album, Aurora, was released in 1969, which did not sell any better than the first one. Despite positive critical reviews, the singles nor the albums made any commercial impact, and the group disbanded in November 1969.

Roger Hedge was a full-timer in a motorhome traveling around the country for many years. He spent a lot of time in the San Jose area and spent his last few years in Oregon to be near his family. He died on January 17, 2022, in Prineville, Oregon. Jim McPherson, who later co-wrote Jefferson Starship's song "Jane", died in California on June 24, 1985. Dennis Carrasco lives in Northern California, and is still an active musician. Tom Bryant lives on the East Coast. Bob Rominger, after a career flying fighters retired from the USAF, lives in Newnan, Georgia, and is a retired flight instructor from Delta Air Lines.

Alec Palao, a passionate fan of Bay Area music of the 1960s and 1970s, spent a couple years doggedly obtaining early Trolls demos, unused album tracks from various companies holding the rights to their music, added some raw live tracks, and put together a CD of the unreleased material for Ace Records. The CD became available in the US in December 2013. All other Stained Glass and/or Trolls CDs are unauthorized.
