= Neighb'rhood Childr'n =

Background information
- Also known as: The Navarros; White Horse
- Origin: Phoenix, Oregon, United States
- Genres: Psychedelic pop; psychedelic rock; garage rock
- Years active: 1963–1970
- Label: Acta
- Past members: Rick Bolz - 12 string guitar, harmonica, vocals Ron Raschdorf - guitar, harmonica, vocals W. A. Farrens - drums, harmonica, vocals Dyan Hoffman - vocals, keyboards George Gleim - bass, vocals John Morrison - drums Gary Campbell - guitar Tom Ryan - drums

The Neighb'rhood Childr'n were an American psychedelic pop/rock band from San Francisco, California. The band was primarily active during the late 1960s.

== History ==
The band started in 1963 in Phoenix, Oregon (a small city outside of Medford) as the teen band The Navarros, playing surf music and R&B. The original members were Rick Bolz, George Gleim, Dyan Hoffman, John Morrison, and Gary Campbell. After cutting a single on a local Oregon label, the band began recording in San Francisco and got caught up in the psychedelic rock movement. Morrison was drafted and replaced by Tom Ryan on drums. Later, Campbell and Gleim joined the reserve, and Ryan also decided to quit the band. These three were replaced by Ron Raschdorf on guitar and W. A. Farrens on drums, both from Oroville, California. The band had previously changed their name from the Navarros to The Neighb'rhood Childr'n. They recorded a self-titled album on the Acta label which was released in 1968. This album is now much sought after by record collectors. They toured constantly in support of the album, opening for The Who, The Grass Roots, Deep Purple, and The Beau Brummels and going on a short tour with The Turtles. After encountering problems on tour, the band developed a religious focus and changed their name to White Horse. A second album that was recorded for Dot Records was not released because of the closure of the company. The Childr'n could not find another label to release their second album, and the group disbanded in 1970.

== Influences ==
Their sound was compared to that of Jefferson Airplane, especially because of the vocal interplay between Dyan Hoffman and Rick Bolz, and The Turtles.

== Discography ==
=== Albums ===
- Neighb'rhood Childr'n (1968)
- Long Years in Space (1997) (compilation of first album and bonus tracks)

=== Singles ===
- "Please Leave Me Alone"/"Happy Child", 1968, Acta
- "Behold The Lilies"/"I Want Action", 1968, Acta
- "She's Got No Identification"/"?", 1968
- "Woman Think"/"On Our Way", 1969, Dot
