= The Groupies =

American garage/psychedelic rock band

Background information
- Origin: New York, New York, United States
- Genres: Garage rock; psychedelic rock; blues rock
- Label: Atco
- Past members: Ronnie Peters; Peter Hendleman; Norman "Cooker" DesRosiers; Gordon McLaren; Bobby Cortez

The Groupies were an American garage rock-psychedelic rock band from New York City who were active in the 1960s and are known for an innovative approach to primal blues-based rock exemplified in such songs as "Primitive". They were a popular fixture in the New York club scene and recorded for Atco Records, later venturing to Los Angeles. Due to their uncompromising stance the Groupies failed to attract a wider audience outside of their local enclaves. They have come to the attention of garage rock and psychedelic enthusiasts and their work has been included on various compilations such as the 1998 Nuggets four-CD box set, which was released on Rhino Records. Their material has been re-issued on other garage rock and psychedelic compilations such as the Pebbles, Volume 10 LP.

The band was formed on the Lower East Side of Manhattan in New York City by bassist Gordon McLaren. Their lineup consisted of McLaren along with Ronnie Peters on lead vocals and tambourine, Peter Hindlemen on lead guitar, Norman "Cooker" DesRosiers on rhythm guitar, and Bobby Cortez on drums. They played regularly at the Scene, a New York nightclub and became one of the most popular live acts around town, for a while second only to the Young Rascals, and were signed by Ahmet Ertegun to Atco Records in 1965. For Atco the Groupies cut a single "Primitive" b/w Leiber & Stoller's "I'm a Hog for You," which was released in January 1966. However, Ertegun's high expectations for the band did not materialize, as the band failed to score a hit or gain recognition outside of New York City. None of this was helped by the band's uncompromisingly noncommercial musical approach, which they sometimes used the term "abstract music" to describe. Nor was the band willing to cooperate with the label's attempts to promote them, even going so far as on one occasion to miss a concert planned for them in Philadelphia, and instead boarding a plane to Los Angeles. The label dropped them, but the band became involved in the Los Angeles scene for a while, and were captured on field recordings made by Neil Hopper of songs such as "Down In the Bottom" and "You Changed Again". However, the group met with limited success in L.A. and eventually broke up.

In the 1970s, Norman DesRosiers enjoyed minor solo success recording under the name Cooker. In 1974, the single "Try (Try to Fall in Love)" b/w "The Ah-Ah Song", penned by DesRosiers, peaked at No. 88 on the Billboard Hot 100. As a solo artist, he gained a brief popularity in Los Angeles.

== Membership ==
- Ronnie Peters (rhythm guitar)
- Peter Hindlemen (lead guitar)
- Norman "Cooker" DesRosiers (lead vocals and tambourine)
- Gordon McLaren (bass)
- Bobby Cortez (drums)

== Discography ==
- "Primitive" b/w "I'm a Hog for You Baby" (Atco 6393, January 1966)
