= Salvation (American band) =

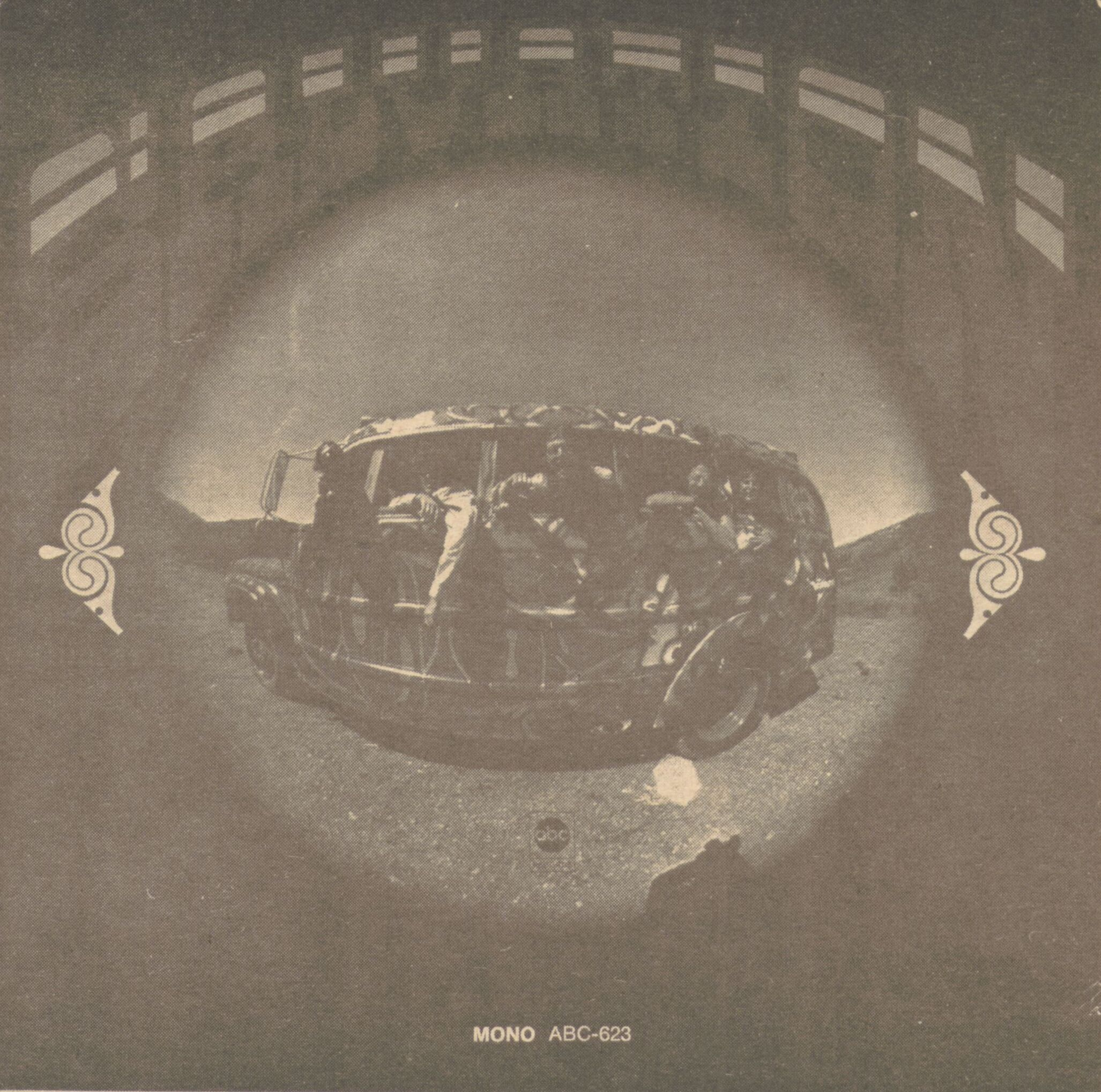
Debut album, 1967

Salvation was a late-1960s American psychedelic rock band, formed in Seattle, Washington, and later based in San Francisco, California.

The group started as the New Salvation Army Banned in 1967, with the line-up of Al Linde singing and Joe Tate on guitar, later supplemented by bassist Artie McLean, keyboardist Art Resnick, and drummer Teddy Stewart. The group was sometimes billed as the New Salvation Army Band, and their name prompted a legal challenge from The Salvation Army church organization. They performed in San Francisco, featured as the house band at the Roaring Twenties topless club in North Beach, at shows in Golden Gate Park and at the Haight-Ashbury communal venue, the Straight Theater. On June 11, they also performed at the Fantasy Fair and Magic Mountain Music Festival. In 1967, they changed their name to Salvation, and issued their eponymous debut album in December, followed later by their second release in 1968, Gypsy Carnival Caravan, both on ABC Records. On the latter release, Rick Levin had replaced Stewart on drums. Both of these records were plagued by poor promotion and sales. The band performed as an opening act for The Doors and Big Brother and the Holding Company, before headlining in New York City at the Fillmore East in 1969. They dissolved in 1970 over financial issues.

== Discography ==
=== Albums ===
- Salvation (March 1968, ABC 623)
- Gypsy Carnival Caravan (November 1968, ABC 653)

=== Singles ===
- "Think Twice" b/w "Love Comes In Funny Packages" (January 1968, ABC 11025)

== Sources ==
- Ankeny, Jason. "Salvation". AllMusic.
- "Varni's Roaring Twenties and the New Salvation Army Banned". Rock Prosopography.
