= The Vejtables =

American rock band

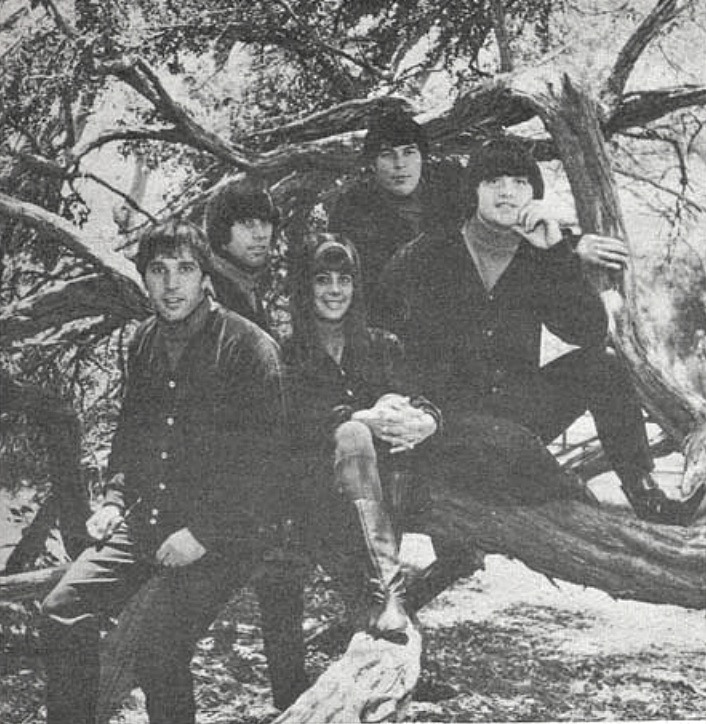
- Circa 1965

Background information
- Origin: Millbrae, California, U.S.
- Genres: Rock
- Years active: 1964 - 1966
- Labels: Autumn Records
- Past members: Bob Bailey; Jan Errico; Richard Fortunato; Ned Hollis; Jim Sawyers; Reese Sheets; Frank Smith

The Vejtables were an American rock band from Millbrae, California, United States. They recorded for the Autumn label and found limited success with such songs as "I Still Love You" and a cover version of Tom Paxton's "The Last Thing on My Mind".

Lead singer Jan Errico also played drums for the group's recordings, making her one of the relatively few female drummers at the time. The Vejtables began their career playing bars and nightclubs along El Camino Real on the San Francisco Peninsula, even though they were still in high school at the time.

== Background ==
The band's origin was Portola Valley which is south of San Francisco. They started playing together around 1964. A good body of their Autumn recordings were produced by Sly Stone.

== Career ==
From 1964 to 1965 the line up consisted of Ned Hollis on rhythm guitar, organ and backing vocals, Bob Bailey on lead vocals, tambourine, harmonica and percussion, Jan Errico (aka Jan Ashton) on drums and backing vocals, Rick Dey on bass and backing vocals, and Bob Cole on lead guitar.

In May 1965, the band was part of a KYA sponsored concert held at the San Francisco Civic Auditorium. Other acts at the concert were The Beau Brummels, The Byrds, Paul Revere and the Raiders, and The Rolling Stones. Also in 1965, Autumn label boss Tom Donahue had hired Sly Stone to produce the group along with The Great Society, The Mojo Men and The Beau Brummels. By mid to late August, Billboard had predicted that their single "I Still Love You" would reach the Hot 100 chart. It did quite well in Chicago. Debuting on 10 September, it spent three weeks in the charts, peaking at No. 23 late in that month. By October 1965, "I Still Love You" along with others by The Other Tikis, The Mojo Men, and The Beau Brummels appeared in a Billboard advertisement "Autumn Is Here With Big Records Breaking Nationally With Proven Sales In Major Markets". Also in October 1965, the band was also on the bill of a Tom "Big Daddy" Donahue and Bob Mitchell produced concert at The Cow Palace (San Francisco) that featuring Little Anthony & The Imperials, Bobby Freeman, The Beau Brummels, The Byrds, Glen Campbell, The Castaways, The Lovin Spoonful, The Mojo Men, Charlie Rich, The Shangri Las, Sonny & Cher, The Sunrays, The Tikis, The Toys, and Roy Head.

In early January 1966, the group was playing at the Nu Beat club in Redwood City which had recently opened. Also that year Autumn went broke and closed which meant the end of their relationship with the label. By the spring of 1966, Errico had already left the band and she was a member of The Mojo Men. Bob Bailey kept the band going while they had some changing line ups. For a short time Bob Mosley who would one day join Moby Grape was a member, but he never recorded with the group. With a change in musical direction to a more psychedelic sound, the group recorded two more singles in 1966 for the Uptown and Tower labels. They were credited as The Book of Changes for their Tower release. The A side of the single was "I Stole The Goodyear Blimp" was a novelty type of single.

== Members ==
Jan Errico actually changed her last name to Ashton because she thought it sounded British. She later left the group because their sound was evolving into a harder psychedelic sound, joining another San Francisco group, the Mojo Men, for which she sang a very audible harmony vocal on their biggest selling single, the Stephen Stills-composed "Sit Down I Think I Love You" from 1967. The Mojo Men eventually shortened their name to Mojo, and released an album and several singles on the GRT label before disbanding.

=== Personnel ===
- Jan Errico (Jan Ashton) - drummer, vocals
- Bob Bailey - tambourine, vocals
- Bob Cole - guitar (1965)
- Rick Dey - bass
- Ned Hollis - guitar, organ
- Reese Sheets - guitar
- Frank Smith - bass (1966)
- Jim Sawyers - guitar (1966)
- Richard Fortunato - guitar, vocals (1966)
- Roland Oeler - bass
- Saul Lewis - organ, vocals
- Arthur Penhallow - drums
- Bob Mosley - bass (1966)

== Discography ==
Singles
Title	Release info	Year	Notes
"I Still Love You" / "Anything"	Autumn 15	1965	
"The Last Thing On My Mind" / "Mansion Of Tears"	Autumn 23	1965	Produced by Marty Cooper
"Shadows" / "Feel The Music"	Uptown 741	1967	Produced by Leo d.G. Kulka
"I Stole The Goodyear Blimp" / "Suddenly I'm Desperately In Love"	Tower 337	1967	as The Book Of Changes; Produced by Jim Marino

Feel the VejtablesSundazed Music SC 11031 - 1995Note: In 1995, a compilation album was published titled Feel the Vejtables. The compilation includes tracks released in 1965 and 1966.
No	Title	Writer(s)	Length
01	"Anything"	Bailey	1:57
02	"I Still Love You"	Errico	2:22
03	"Mansion of Tears"	Cooper	2:20
04	"The Last Thing on My Mind"	Paxton	2:28
05	"Smile, Smile, Smile" (Previously unissued)	Errico	1:55
06	"Cold Dreary Morning"	Errico	2:11
07	"I Still Love You" (Alternate version)	Errico	2:16
08	"Feel The Music"	Fortunato/Bailey	2:50
09	"Shadows"	Fortunato/Bailey	3:10
10	"Better Rearrange" (Previously unissued in US)	Bailey/Fortunato	2:16
11	"Good Times" (Previously unissued in US)	Bailey/Fortunato	3:28
12	"Time and Place" (Previously unissued in US)	Bailey/Fortunato	3:46
13	"Suddenly I'm Desperately In Love"	Oeller	2:08
14	"I Stole The Goodyear Blimp"	Smith	2:19
15	"Hide Yourself" (Previously unissued in US)	Bailey/Fortunato	2:48
16	"Good Things Are Happening" (Previously unissued in US)	Bailey/Fortunato	2:47
17	"Hide Yourself" (Alternate take, previously unissued instrumental)	Bailey/Fortunato	4:00
