= The Mojo Men =

American rock band

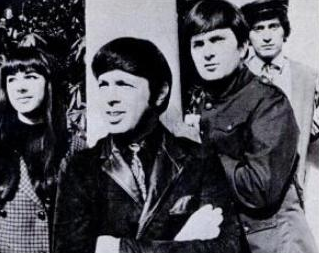
- The Mojo Men in 1967

Background information
- Also known as: Sly and the Mojo Men, The Mojo, Mojo
- Origin: San Francisco, California, United States
- Genres: Garage rock; sunshine pop; psychedelic rock; folk pop; psychedelic pop; baroque pop
- Years active: 1965–1969
- Labels: Autumn, Warner Bros/Reprise, GRT Records
- Past members: Jim Alaimo; Paul Curcio; Don Metchick; Bob Carhart; Dennis DeCarr (Dennis Potokar); Jan Errico; Sly Stone

The Mojo Men was an American rock band based in San Francisco. Formed in 1965, the group underwent several name and personnel changes until their 1969 breakup. Their highest-charting Billboard Hot 100 single was a cover of Buffalo Springfield's "Sit Down, I Think I Love You", which peaked at number 36 in 1967.

== History ==
Singer/bassist Jim Alaimo (né James Charles Alamio; 1938–1992), guitarist Paul Curcio, drummer Dennis DeCarr (Potokar), and keyboardist Don Metchick were bandmates in Florida who moved to San Francisco in 1964 to form a new band. There they met Sylvester Stewart, later known as Sly Stone, then a record producer at Autumn Records for acts such as The Beau Brummels and The Vejtables. Stewart and the band recorded a few songs under the name Sly and the Mojo Men but Stewart, unsatisfied with the results, chose not to release them. He continued working with the band as a songwriter and producer on "Dance with Me" (1965), the Mojo Men's first song to enter the Billboard Hot 100 chart, and "She's My Baby" (1966).

DeCarr (Potokar) left the group in 1966 and was replaced by drummer/vocalist Jan Errico, formerly of the Vejtables. The Mojo Men then moved from Autumn to Reprise Records, where the band's earlier British Invasion-influenced garage rock style evolved into pop/folk rock. In 1967, the band released a Baroque cover version of Buffalo Springfield's "Sit Down, I Think I Love You". Written by Stephen Stills and arranged by Van Dyke Parks, the song became the Mojo Men's first and only top 40 single. Metchick left the band in 1968, and the remaining trio shortened their name to The Mojo, and then just Mojo, before they released their lone studio album, Mojo Magic, on GRT Records. The group disbanded in 1969.

"Sit Down, I Think I Love You" was included on the seminal 1972 Nuggets: Original Artyfacts from the First Psychedelic Era, 1965–1968 garage rock compilation album. Sundazed Music released three Mojo Men compilation albums between 1995 and 2003, and in 2008 Big Beat Records released the compilation Not Too Old to Start Cryin': The Lost 1966 Masters. The band's single "She's My Baby" was sampled on Kanye West's "Hell of a Life", a song from his 2010 album My Beautiful Dark Twisted Fantasy.

Curcio founded the Music America Studios in Rochester, New York, and produced Kill 'Em All, Metallica's debut studio album (1983). He died on September 10, 2018, at age 74.

== Discography ==
=== Studio album ===
Year	Album details
1968	Mojo Magic (as Mojo): Label: General Recorded Tape

=== Compilation albums ===
Year	Album details
1995	Whys Ain't Supposed To Be: Label: Sundazed
1995	Sit Down... It's The Mojo Men: Label: Sundazed
2003	There Goes My Mind: Label: Sundazed
2008	Not Too Old to Start Cryin': The Lost 1966 Masters: Label: Big Beat

=== Singles ===
Year	Song	Peak chart positions		
Year	Song	U.S. Billboard	U.S. Cashbox	CAN
1965	"Off the Hook"	—	—	—
1965	"Dance with Me"	61	98	23
1966	"She's My Baby"	—	—	—
1967	"Sit Down, I Think I Love You"	36	39	26
1967	"Me About You"	83	93	70
1968	"What Ever Happened To Happy"	—	—	—
1968	"New York City" (as The Mojo)	—	—	—
1968	"Should I Cry" (as The Mojo)	—	—	—
1968	"Don't Be Cruel" (as The Mojo)	—	—	—
1969	"I Can't Let Go" (as Mojo)	—	—	—
1969	"Candle to Burn" (as Mojo)	—	—	—
1969	"Everyday Love" (as Mojo)	—	—	—
"—" denotes releases that did not chart.
