= The Heavy discography =

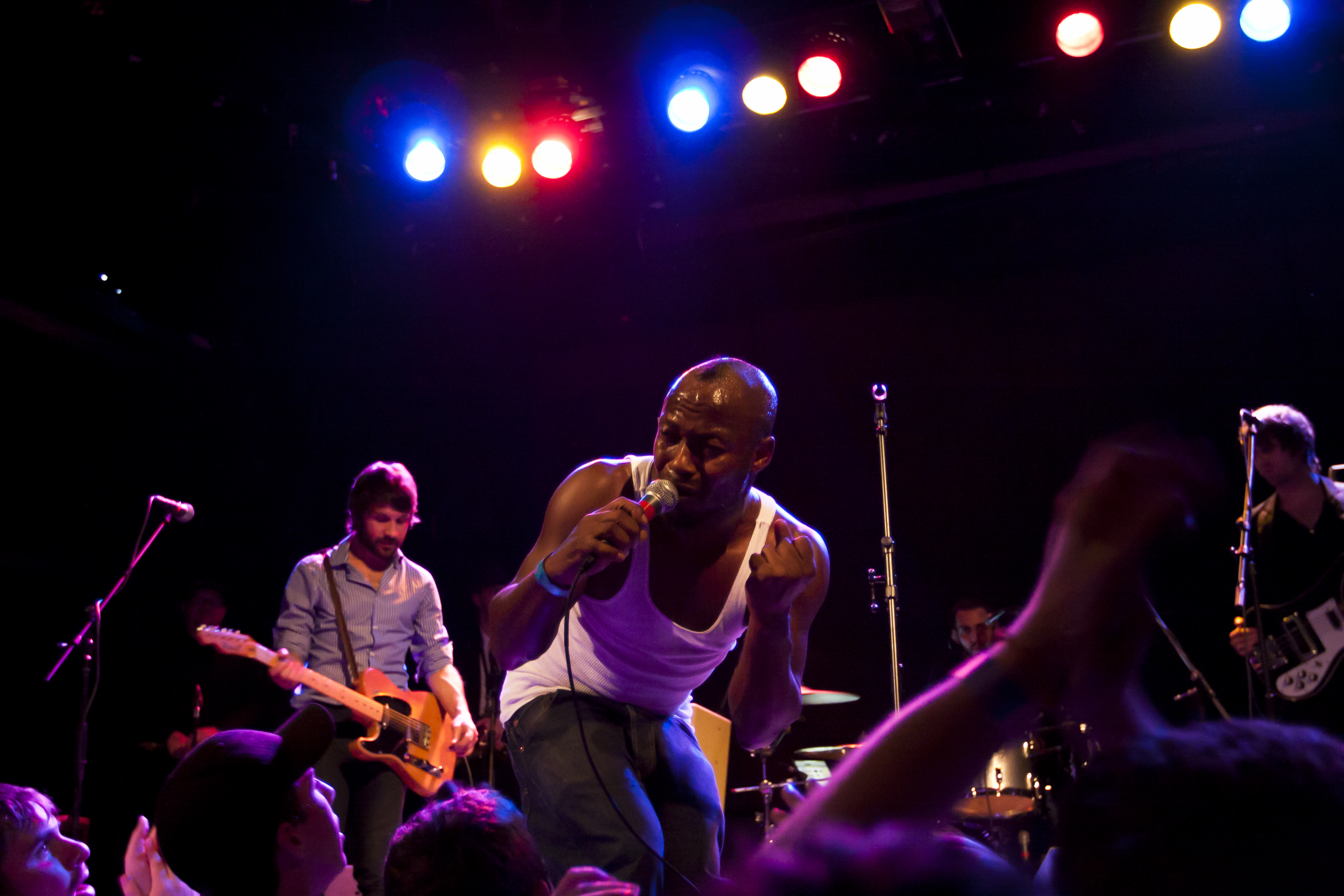
- The Heavy performing at the Bowery Ballroom, New York City in 2010
- Studio albums: 6
- EPs: 1
- Compilation albums: 1
- Singles: 16

The discography of English rock band The Heavy consists of six studio albums, one greatest hits album, one extended play, and 16 singles.

== Albums ==
=== Studio albums ===
Title	Album details	Peak chart positions						
Title	Album details	UK	AUT	BEL (FL)	BEL (WA)	FRA	SWI	US
Great Vengeance and Furious Fire	Released: 17 September 2007; Label: Counter; Formats: CD, LP, DD	—	—	—	—	—	—	—
The House That Dirt Built	Released: 13 October 2009; Label: Counter; Formats: CD, LP, DD	—	—	—	—	—	168	192
The Glorious Dead	Released: 20 August 2012; Label: Counter; Formats: CD, LP, DD	—	—	—	—	—	134	191
Hurt & the Merciless	Released: 1 April 2016; Label: Counter, Bad Son; Formats: CD, LP, DD	36	72	132	170	132	41	—
Sons	Released: 17 May 2019; Label: BMG; Formats: CD, LP, DD	—	—	—	—	—	—	—
Amen	To be released: 21 April 2023; Label: Bad Son; Formats: LP, DD	To be released						
"—" denotes a release that did not chart.

=== Compilation albums ===
List of compilation albums
Title	Album details
Heavyweight	Released: 10 August 2016 (Japan only); Label: Beat; Formats: CD

== Extended plays ==
List of compilation albums
Title	Album details
How You Like Me Now?	Released: 29 November 2010; Label: Counter; Formats: CD, LP, DD

== Singles ==
List of singles, with chart positions, showing year released and album name
Title	Year	Peak chart positions						Album
Title	Year	BEL (FL)	FRA	JPN	NLD	US	US Alt.	Album
"That Kind of Man"	2006	—	—	—	—	—	—	Great Vengeance and Furious Fire
"In the Morning" / "You Don't Know"	2007	—	—	—	—	—	—	Great Vengeance and Furious Fire
"Coleen"	2007	—	—	—	—	—	—	Great Vengeance and Furious Fire
"Oh No! Not You Again!"	2009	—	—	—	—	—	—	The House That Dirt Built
"Sixteen"	2009	—	—	—	—	—	—	The House That Dirt Built
"How You Like Me Now?"	2009	70	—	—	67	122	—	The House That Dirt Built
"No Time"	2009	—	—	—	—	—	—	The House That Dirt Built
"What Makes a Good Man?"	2012	—	127	—	—	—	31	The Glorious Dead
"Can't Play Dead"	2012	—	—	—	—	—	—	The Glorious Dead
"Curse Me Good"	2013	—	—	—	—	—	—	The Glorious Dead
"Same 'Ol"	2014	—	—	66	—	—	—	The Glorious Dead
"Since You Been Gone"	2016	—	—	—	—	—	39	Hurt & the Merciless
"Turn Up"	2016	—	—	—	—	—	—	Hurt & the Merciless
"What Happened to the Love?"	2016	—	—	—	—	—	—	Hurt & the Merciless
"WTF?"	2016	—	—	—	—	—	—	Hurt & the Merciless
"Panic Attack"	2016	—	—	—	—	—	—	Hurt & the Merciless
"Heavy for You"	2019	—	—	—	—	—	—	Sons
"Burn Bright"	2019	—	—	—	—	—	—	Sons
"Better as One"	2019	—	—	—	—	—	—	Sons
"Hurricane Coming"	2023	—	—	—	—	—	—	Amen

== Other charted songs ==
List of songs, with chart positions, showing year released and album name
Title	Year	Peak chart positions	Album
Title	Year	FRA	Album
"Short Change Hero"	2009	109	The House That Dirt Built
