= The Bonniwell Music Machine (album) =

Studio album by the Bonniwell Music Machine
- Released: February 10, 1968
- Recorded: 1967
- Studio: Jazz City, New Orleans; RCA and United, Los Angeles
- Genre: Psychedelic rock; garage rock; proto-punk
- Length: 37:29
- Label: Warner Bros.
- Producer: Brian Ross

The Bonniwell Music Machine chronology
| (Turn On) The Music Machine (1966) | The Bonniwell Music Machine (1968) | The Best of the Music Machine (1984) |

Singles from The Bonniwell Music Machine
- 1. "Double Yellow Line" Released: April 22, 1967; 2. "The Eagle Never Hunts the Fly" Released: June 17, 1967

The Bonniwell Music Machine is the second and final album by the American garage rock band the Music Machine, recorded under the renamed moniker the Bonniwell Music Machine, and released on Warner Bros. Records on February 10, 1968 (see 1968 in music). As with their debut LP, the album again saw the band blending garage and psychedelic rock influences, albeit with a greater emphasis on psychedelia than on their previous album release. Prior to completing its recording, all of the group's original members, except for its creative force, Sean Bonniwell, departed, though they would still appear on some of the album's tracks.

The Bonniwell Music Machine failed to reach the Billboard 200, although it was Bonniwell's most experimental recording period in his career. Its attending singles, "The Eagle Never Hunts the Fly" and "Double Yellow Line", also did not fare well nationally. Disillusioned by the music industry, Bonniwell produced additional recordings that went widely unnoticed, and disbanded The Bonniwell Music Machine and abandoned his music career within a year. The album went relatively unheard until its material was rereleased along with studio outtakes on the compilation album Beyond the Garage.

== Background ==
The Music Machine came to national prominence, briefly, in late 1966 when their rebellious proto-punk single, "Talk Talk", reached number 15 on the Billboard Hot 100 chart. Throughout the latter half of 1966 and early 1967, the band enjoyed tremendous popularity among teenage fans on Los Angeles's club circuit. Further commercial success followed to a limited degree with their debut album, (Turn On) The Music Machine, and the follow-up single, "The People In Me", reaching number 66. However, with the combination of poorly scheduled tour dates and insufficient royalties, The Music Machine's lineup disassembled, leaving chief songwriter Sean Bonniwell as the only original member remaining to record the group's second album. As a result, the band's popularity waned, and by mid-1967, they had been all but forgotten by mainstream pop audiences.

Undeterred Bonniwell, with the support of record producer Brian Ross, convinced their record label, Original Sound, to transfer their recording contract to Warner Bros. Records. Executive Art Laboe agreed to the move out of disinterest for Bonniwell's desire to create a coherent concept album, rather than hit-ready singles. Nonetheless, Original Sound did distribute the group's single, "The Eagle Never Hunts the Fly", for a perceived, but ill-founded, resemblance to Count Five's Top Ten hit, "Psychotic Reaction", before cutting all ties with the band. Auditions for a refashioned lineup resulted in the recruitment of session musicians Ed Jones (bass guitar), Harry Garfield (organ), Alan Wisdom (lead guitar), and Jerry Harris (drums). An agreement between Bonniwell and his former bandmates appointed both his and the band's royalties directly to Bonniwell to reimburse him for past debts, a consequence of The Music Machine's erratic touring. To place an emphasis on Bonniwell, the creative force of the band, the group was renamed The Bonniwell Music Machine.

The original lineup partially recorded and rehearsed material for the upcoming album, along with some demos, at Cosimo Matassa's Jazz City Studio in New Orleans, in the first half of 1967. Three tracks from the sessions were included on the album, along with an additional three recordings at RCA Studios in March 1967. With the new lineup, Bonniwell and Ross were ushered into United Western Recorders in late 1967 to finish the album. However, Ross was generally uninvolved, leaving Bonniwell to remix and overdub the recordings, and supervise the session musicians. According to Bonniwell, "Each [track] was a studio invention... I also knew that the seven or eight people that I used in the recording studio really had no notion at all what they were doing. I mean, they played the right notes and they tolerated my unyielding pursuit of excellence, for the most part they did. But I would have to go back in after they recorded, and I mean, I spent hours remixing and dubbing and just doing things that were joyless". Despite the issues, Bonniwell successfully expanded upon organ-driven garage rock into eclectic psychedelia, with traces of folk rock and orchestration. In addition, the album arguably covered the band's most inventive studio arrangements and lyrical wordplay.

== Release and reception ==
The Bonniwell Music Machine was released on February 10, 1968, and failed to reach the Billboard 200. The album was preceded by two singles, "Double Yellow Line" and "The Eagle Never Hunts the Fly", released April 22, 1967 and June 17, 1967 respectively, but both releases were also commercially unsuccessful. A third incarnation of the band was assembled thereafter, and continued to release non-album material, but could never match their past success from the original lineup. Bonniwell disbanded the group, and released one solo album called Close, in 1969, before taking a lengthy hiatus from the music industry. Although The Bonniwell Music Machine was largely overlooked at the time of its release, and had gone out of print by the early 1970s, its reputation has continued to grow over the years. A revival of interest in the band's music began in 1995, when all of the album's material, along with outtakes and other unreleased tracks, were compiled on the album Beyond the Garage. In 2014, The Bonniwell Music Machine was rereleased on compact disc format on Big Beat Records.

The Warner's album isn't "fully realized" because I was dealing with players who knew little of the legacy of the MM, even though (at the time) the use of the word legacy would have been presumptuous. But I did have a sense that my work might be remembered as originative.

- Sean Bonniwell reflecting on the album in a 2011 interview

In his 1998 book Unknown Legends of Rock 'N' Roll, music historian Richie Unterberger describes The Bonniwell Music Machine as Bonniwell's most far-reaching and experimental writing and recording period, and says that some of its contents were "as hard-hitting as '60s pop-punk got". Unterberger also commented on the Allmusic website that the album saw "Bonniwell branching out from psych-punk into a poppier and more eclectic direction", while also noting that the results were not of the same standards as other tracks. Rock critic Gary Burns, writing for Popular Music and Society, commented on Bonniwell's music, saying, "His approach is entirely adult, and his songs are for adults. This may be why commercial success mostly eluded him. You hear that Vox/Farfisa organ sound and expect bubblegum. What you get instead is mature psychodrama". A review in the Chicago Tribune writes that, despite the album's lack of success during its initial release, "the bulk of the material remains fresh and brashly distinctive".

== Track listing ==
All tracks were written by Sean Bonniwell.

Side one

| No. | Title | Length |
|---|---|---|
| 1. | "Astrologically Incompatible" | 2:31 |
| 2. | "Double Yellow Line" | 2:08 |
| 3. | "The Day Today" | 2:50 |
| 4. | "Absolutely Positively" | 2:11 |
| 5. | "Somethin Hurtin On Me" | 3:00 |
| 6. | "The Trap" | 2:28 |
| 7. | "Soul Love" | 3:31 |

Side two

| No. | Title | Length |
|---|---|---|
| 1. | "Bottom Of The Soul" | 1:56 |
| 2. | "Talk Me Down" | 2:47 |
| 3. | "The Eagle Never Hunts The Fly" | 2:45 |
| 4. | "I've Loved You" | 2:45 |
| 5. | "Affirmative No" | 2:06 |
| 6. | "Discrepancy" | 2:29 |
| 7. | "Me, Myself, And I" | 2:02 |
| Total length: | | 37:29 |

== Personnel ==
- Sean Bonniwell - lead vocals, rhythm guitar, horn
- Mark Landon - lead guitar
- Ron Edgar - drums
- Doug Rhodes - bass guitar, keyboards, tambourine, backing vocals
- Keith Olsen - bass guitar, backing vocals
- Alan Wisdom - lead guitar
- Jerry Harris - drums
- Ed Jones - bass guitar, backing vocals
- Harry Garfield - keyboards
