= Ignition (The Music Machine album) =

Compilation album by The Music Machine
- Released: June 27, 2000
- Recorded: 1965–1969, RCA Recording Studios, Los Angeles California
- Genre: Garage rock; psychedelic rock; proto-punk; folk rock
- Length: 46:35
- Label: Sundazed
- Producer: Tim Livingston, Sean Bonniwell

The Music Machine chronology
Turn On: The Best of the Music Machine (1999)	Ignition (2000)	The Ultimate Turn On (2006)

Ignition is a compilation album by the American garage rock band, The Music Machine, and was released on June 27, 2000 on Sundazed Music (see 2000 in music). It includes an assortment of rare singles, outtakes, and previously unreleased material spanning from when the group went under the moniker, the Raggamuffins, in 1965, to their disbandment in 1969. The Raggamuffins were a folk rock trio led by Sean Bonniwell, and the prototype group that developed an experimental hard-edge sound, before recruiting two additional members and becoming the Music Machine. By 1969, all the original members, except Bonniwell, departed the group, which was then known as the Bonniwell Music Machine. Though the band would no longer produce hits, such as "Talk Talk" and "The People In Me", it was Bonniwell's most ambitious recording period as he incorporated elements of psychedelia and pop rock into the group's music.

The four songs "Two Much", "Push Don't Pull", "Talk Me Down", and "Chances", were all composed and recorded in 1965, when the group was known as the Raggamuffins, and were previously unreleased. They featured a mixture of the band's folk rock roots and the protopunk better assimilated with the Music Machine. Among other songs was "Black Snow", which later appeared on Bonniwell's solo album, Close in 1969, and "Smoke & Water", a rehearsal song that was demoed. In addition, the commercially unsuccessful single "Advice and Consent", the outtake "Dark White", and "Citizen Fear" were some of the latest recordings by The Music Machine before their disbandment. The remaining material was rare and obscure tracks by the group, with the majority being penned by Bonniwell.

== Track listing ==
1. "Everything Is Everything"
2. "Two Much"
3. "Advise and Consent"
4. "This Should Make You Happy"
5. "Black Snow"
6. "Chances"
7. "Mother Nature, Father Earth"
8. "Talk Me Down"
9. "Dark White"
10. "Push Don't Pull"
11. "Smoke and Water"
12. "King Mixer"
13. "Unca Tinka Ty"
14. "Citizen Fear"
15. "Worry"
16. "Worry" (alternate version)
17. "Tell Me What Ya Got"
18. "Point of No Return"
19. "902"

== Personnel ==
- Sean Bonniwell - lead vocals, rhythm guitar, horn
- Mark Landon - lead guitar
- Ron Edgar - drums
- Doug Rhodes - bass guitar, keyboards, tambourine, backing vocals
- Keith Olsen - bass guitar, backing vocals
- Jeane Harris - drums
- Eddie Jones - bass guitar
- Harry Garfield - keyboards
