= Bongo Rock (album) =

Studio album by Incredible Bongo Band
- Released: 1973
- Studio: Can Base (Vancouver, Canada)
- Genre: Funk
- Length: 33:17
- Label: Pride/MGM
- Producer: Perry Botkin Jr.; Michael Viner

Incredible Bongo Band chronology
Bongo Rock (1973)	The Return of the Incredible Bongo Band (1974)

Bongo Rock is the debut studio album by Incredible Bongo Band, released in 1973. It peaked at number 197 on the Billboard Top LPs & Tape chart. It includes the band's version of the Jerry Lordan-written song "Apache", which is among the most famous breakbeats.

== Background ==
Michael Viner, who was an executive at MGM Records, started the project Incredible Bongo Band. He was asked to provide music for the soundtrack of the blaxploitation film The Thing with Two Heads; he and Perry Botkin Jr. recorded the songs "Bongo Rock" and "Bongolia". After that, they decided to create the album Bongo Rock.

== Production ==
Bongo Rock was recorded at Can Base Studios in Vancouver, Canada. It contains performances by percussionist King Errisson and drummer Jim Gordon, as well as multiple musicians.

== Critical reception ==
Professional ratings
Review scores
Source	Rating
AllMusic	3.5/5 stars
Tiny Mix Tapes	4/5 stars

Jeff Tamarkin of AllMusic stated, "Interesting as it is to hear how the bongo-centric beats were toyed with by the hip-hoppers, the original recordings stand up on their own as classically kitschy cheese-rock." He added, "Bongos aren't the only sound heard, naturally, and fans of both lounge-rock and that crisp, reverby guitar sound prominent in old spy movies and Ventures records will dig what the IBB were all about." Alan Ranta of Tiny Mix Tapes commented that "'Apache' may be the most recognizable, but there is still a rich field of extractable samples to be had for the next generation."

== Legacy ==
Bongo Rock was included in the book The Mojo Collection: The Ultimate Music Companion. It was also included in the book 1001 Albums You Must Hear Before You Die.

In 2006, Will Hermes of The New York Times called the album "one of the musical cornerstones of rap." He added, "While it's hard to measure these things accurately, it is certainly one of the most sampled LP's in history, if not the most sampled."

Dan Forrer's documentary film Sample This tells the story of Michael Viner and Incredible Bongo Band.

== Track listing ==
Bongo Rock track listing
No.	Title	Writer(s)	Length
1.	"Let There Be Drums"	Sandy Nelson; Richard Podolor	2:41
2.	"Apache"	Jerry Lordan	4:53
3.	"Bongolia"	Perry Botkin Jr.	2:15
4.	"Last Bongo in Belgium"	Perry Botkin Jr.; Michael Viner	6:55
5.	"Dueling Bongos"	Perry Botkin Jr.; Michael Viner	2:58
6.	"In-A-Gadda-Da-Vida"	Doug Ingle	7:43
7.	"Raunchy '73"	Bill Justis; Sid Manker	3:24
8.	"Bongo Rock '73"	Preston Epps; Arthur Egnoian	2:39
Total length:			33:17

== Charts ==
Chart performance for Bongo Rock
Chart (1973)	Peak position
US Top LPs & Tape (Billboard)	197
US Top Soul LPs (Billboard)	58
