= Bongo Rock =

Bongo Rock may refer to:

- Bongo Rock (album), album by Incredible Bongo Band released in 1973
- "Bongo Rock" (instrumental), an instrumental by Preston Epps released in 1959
