= (Turn On) The Music Machine =

Studio album by the Music Machine
- Released: December 1966
- Recorded: November 1966
- Studio: RCA (Los Angeles, California)
- Genre: Garage rock
- Length: 29:48
- Label: Original Sound
- Producer: Brian Ross

The Music Machine chronology
(Turn On) The Music Machine (1966)	The Bonniwell Music Machine (1968)

Singles from (Turn On) The Music Machine
- 1. "Talk Talk" Released: September 10, 1966; 2. "The People in Me" Released: January 21, 1967

(Turn On) The Music Machine is the debut studio album by the American garage rock band the Music Machine, released on Original Sound Records in December 1966. It arrived just months after the group's hit single, "Talk Talk", propelled to number 15 on the national charts. Although the album was hastily recorded to capitalize on the Music Machine's popularity, (Turn On) The Music Machine became a moderate hit on the Billboard Top LPs chart, and is hailed today as a classic garage rock album. Another single, "The People in Me" was also released in support of the album.

== Background ==
Fronted by their innovative songwriter and lead vocalist Sean Bonniwell, The Music Machine became a radio favorite as a result of their rebellious proto-punk song "Talk Talk", which reached number 15 on the Billboard Hot 100 in mid-1966. "Talk Talk", along with the B-side "Come on In", was rigorously rehearsed by the group under the instruction of Bonniwell, who held a virtue to perfecting a uniquely hard-edged sound for the band. By the time The Music Machine entered RCA Studios to record the two songs, they were well-practiced and completed them in only a few takes. Hoping to capitalize on the band's sudden success, their record label Original Sound hastily summoned the members back into the studio to record for (Turn On) The Music Machine.

The album includes five cover versions – "Cherry, Cherry", "Taxman", "See See Rider", "96 Tears", and "Hey Joe"—that were recorded for a local dance club in Los Angeles called 9th Street West, but were never intended to be featured on (Turn On) The Music Machine. However, the group's record producers insisted that the songs would improve record sales, a decision that Bonniwell recalled made him feel "artistically crest-fallen and infuriated". Still, Bonniwell regarded the Music Machine's arrangement of "Hey Joe" as innovative, invoking a slow, moody nuance that is strikingly similar to Jimi Hendrix's more well-known version. All of the remaining tracks were penned by Bonniwell, including the melodically complex "Trouble", the reflective ballad "Some Other Drum", which hinted at the musical direction the group would later take, and "Wrong", a song written in a similar style to "Talk Talk". Perhaps the most accomplished piece other than "Talk Talk" is "Masculine Intuition". Bonniwell explained the song is "very tricky for non-musicians. They really can't quite figure out what it is...I've had other musicians tell me, their bands have tried to play that song, and they can't. There's two sections—it's called a turnaround, and I invert two chords. And if you don't pick up on it, there's no way you can play the song".

(Turn On) The Music Machine was released in December 1966 and reached number 76 on the Billboard Top LPs chart. The Music Machine's second single from the album, "The People in Me", was distributed in January 1967, and managed to chart at number 66. Over the years, the album has been considered a garage rock classic, with Guitar magazine ranking it at number three in its category of "100 Essential Garage Rock Albums". Music historian Richie Unterberger, writing for the Allmusic website, gathers that (Turn On) The Music Machine is highlighted by Bonniwell's original material, and "would have been a lot better if they'd let Sean Bonniwell write all of the songs". Critic Doug Sheppard praised Bonniwell's lyrical style, saying it "transcends the typical boy-girl theme of the day by instead favoring more introspective, psychological matter". In his article The Psychedelic Experience, Brian Hogg wrote the album "naturally features the group's hit single, as well as its flipside, the moody 'Come on In'. But alongside these tracks were five equally excellent Sean Bonniwell originals, as well as five covers" that the author goes on to conclude were "all rather offbeat and idiosyncratic choices". In 1983, Big Beat Records reissued the album, and in 2006 its material was released on the record label's compilation album The Ultimate Turn On.

== Track listing ==
All songs written by Sean Bonniwell except where noted.

=== Side one ===
1. "Talk Talk" – 1:56
2. "Trouble" – 2:11
3. "Cherry, Cherry" (Neil Diamond) – 3:12
4. "Taxman" (George Harrison) – 2:33
5. "Some Other Drum" – 2:29
6. "Masculine Intuition" – 2:08

=== Side two ===
1. "The People in Me" – 2:53
2. "See See Rider" (Ma Rainey, Lena Arant) – 2:29
3. "Wrong" – 2:16
4. "96 Tears" (Rudy Martinez) – 2:17
5. "Come On In" – 2:54
6. "Hey Joe" (Billy Roberts) – 4:12

== Personnel ==
- Sean Bonniwell – lead vocals, rhythm guitar, horn
- Mark Landon – lead guitar
- Ron Edgar – drums
- Doug Rhodes – keyboards, tambourine, backing vocals
- Keith Olsen – bass guitar, backing vocals
