= The Glorious Dead =

The Glorious Dead can refer to:

- "The Glorious Dead", the wording of two inscriptions on the Cenotaph on Whitehall in London, England, UK
- "The Glorious Dead", a 1974 episode of the UK period drama Upstairs, Downstairs
- The Glorious Dead, a 2012 album by English rock band The Heavy
- "The Glorious Dead", a song on the 1992 album False by Dutch metal band Gorefest
