= Let a Woman Be a Woman - Let a Man Be a Man =

Single by Dyke and the Blazers
- B-side: "Uhh"
- Released: August 1969
- Genre: Funk
- Length: 2:33
- Label: Original Sound
- Songwriter: Arlester Christian

Dyke and the Blazers singles chronology
"We Got More Soul" (1969)	"Let a Woman Be a Woman - Let a Man Be a Man" (1969)	"Uhh" (1970)

"Let a Woman Be a Woman - Let a Man Be a Man" is a 1969 song by Dyke and the Blazers. The song was written by bandleader Arlester Christian. Itself containing a sample of City Catastrophe by Jac Holzman, its drum break has been sampled upwards of 200 times, and has proven to be a common breakbeat.

== Chart performance ==
Chart (1969)	Peak position
Billboard Hot 100	36
Billboard Best Selling Soul Singles	4

== Sampling ==
According to the sampling website database WhoSampled.com, "Let a Woman Be a Woman" is on the Sampled in More Than 200 Songs list and was on the Most Sampled Tracks list at #100 with more than 180 songs sampling, until being knocked off by the Fairlight CMI digital synthesizer sampled for the "ORCH5" orchestra hit sample, itself sampling the Philharmonia Orchestra's Firebird Suite by Igor Stravinsky. Nonetheless, it is one of the most sampled singles primarily due to the breakbeat after the line "Some people don't like the way Sally walk" which lined up to the sound effect of a firetruck, giving it its unique sound. The songs sampling include "If My Homie Calls" by 2Pac (1991), "Rusty" by Tyler, the Creator ft. Earl Sweatshirt and Domo Genesis (2013), "Sally" by Stetsasonic (1988), where the entire song centers around the "Sally" line and sample, "Welcome to the Terrordome" by Public Enemy (1989), and even outside of hip-hop with "Jack-Ass" by Beck (1996) and "How You Like Me Now?" by The Heavy (2009).
