= Incredible Bongo Band =

1972–1974 American funk band

- Also known as: Michael Viner's Incredible Bongo Band
- Genre: Funk
- Years active: 1972–1974
- Label: Pride/MGM
- Past members: Michael Viner
- Website: Mr Bongo Records

The Incredible Bongo Band, also known as Michael Viner's Incredible Bongo Band, was a project started in 1972 by Michael Viner, a record artist manager and executive at MGM Records; producer, MGM Records executive, and Curb Records founder Mike Curb; and arranger Perry Botkin Jr. Viner was called on to supplement the soundtrack of the B-film The Thing With Two Heads. The band's output consisted of upbeat, funky instrumental music. Many tracks were covers of popular songs of the day that were characterized by the prominence of bongo drums, conga drums, rock drums, and brass.

The band’s debut album Bongo Rock was featured in Robert Dimery's book 1001 Albums You Must Hear Before You Die.

== History ==
The band released two albums, 1973's Bongo Rock, and 1974's Return of the Incredible Bongo Band. The instrumental "Bongo Rock", co-written by Art Laboe and Preston Epps and released by Epps as a Top 40 hit in 1959, was covered by the Incredible Bongo Band (shown as "Bongo Rock '73" on the album), and became a minor US hit for them in 1973, and a substantial hit in Canada (#20).

Michael Viner would make use of MGM recording facilities in down-time, recruiting whichever studio musicians were on-hand, which included Glen Campbell on guitar and Harry Nilsson on keyboards and arrangements. Important contributions were made by Jim Gordon on drums, and Bobby Hall and King Erisson on percussion.

The first Incredible Bongo Band album included a cover of "Apache", an instrumental tune written by Jerry Lordan and originally made popular in the UK by the Shadows, and in the United States and Canada by Jørgen Ingmann. Their version took inspiration from The Arrows "Apache 65". They recorded the song at Can-Base Studios in Vancouver to take advantage of Canadian content laws, which had helped promote their previous hit, "Bongo Rock." The group's version of "Apache" (produced by Perry Botkin Jr.) was not a hit upon release, and languished in relative obscurity until the late 1970s, when it was adopted by early hip-hop artists, including pioneering deejay Kool Herc, for the uncommonly long percussion break in the middle of the song. Subsequently, many of the Incredible Bongo Band's other releases were sampled by hip-hop producers, and the "Apache" break also remains a staple of many producers in drum and bass. The song received popular attention again in 2001 when it was featured in an ad for an Acura SUV. In 2008, music critic Will Hermes wrote an article on "Apache" and the Incredible Bongo Band for the New York Times and had an entire documentary devoted to it called Sample This: The Birth of Hip Hop. In 2018, Apache was used as the soundtrack to a fight scene in Black Lightning.

As well, the band's cover of "Let There Be Drums," which was made famous by Sandy Nelson and also performed by the Ventures, was used as the theme song for the long-running television show Atlantic Grand Prix Wrestling during the 1980s. It made #66 in Canada in December 1973.

"Last Bongo in Belgium" has been notably sampled in the songs "Looking Down the Barrel of a Gun" performed by the Beastie Boys, "Angel" performed by Massive Attack and "Song of Life" performed by Leftfield.

"Let There Be Drums" was used in Ken Burns' Baseball: The 10th Inning, the follow-up to Burns' '94 PBS documentary.

"In-A-Gadda-Da-Vida" was used as the main loop in two different songs by Nas: "Thief's Theme" and "Hip Hop Is Dead".

The 2013 documentary Sample This, directed by Dan Forrer and narrated by Gene Simmons, recounts the story of the Incredible Bongo Band and its recording of "Apache".

"Bongolia" a track from the Bongo Rock album, was used in Edgar Wright's 2017 film Baby Driver.

== Covers ==
A cover group was formed by musician Shawn Lee, with the parallel name "Shawn Lee's Incredible Tabla Band". It released a cover album on Ubiquity Records in 2011. The album was titled Tabla Rock, based on the album Bongo Rock. On Tabla Rock, Lee covered the entire Bongo Band debut album, as well as two tracks from its second album. Lee's album covers the music on tabla instead of bongo, presenting it in an Indian-funk style.

== Discography ==
Cover art of the 1973 album Bongo Rock

Cover art of the 1974 album The Return of the Incredible Bongo Band

=== Studio albums ===
Year	Album	Chart positions		Record label
Year	Album	US	US R&B	Record label
1973	Bongo Rock	197	58	Pride Records
1974	The Return of the Incredible Bongo Band	—	—	Pride Records
"—" denotes the album failed to chart

=== Compilation albums ===
- The Best of the Incredible Bongo Band (Jupiter Records, 1974)
- Michael Viner's Incredible Bongo Band (Dove Audio, 1996)
- Bongo Rock: The Story of the Incredible Bongo Band (Strut Records, 2001)
- Bongo Rock (Mr Bongo Records, 2006)

=== Singles ===
Year	Single	Peak chart positions			
Year	Single	US Pop	US R&B	US Adult	CAN
1973	"Bongo Rock '73"	57	42	35	20
1973	"Let There Be Drums"	―	90	―	66
1974	"Kiburi"	―	96	―	―
1974	"Ohkey Dokey"	―	―	―	44
1974	"In-A-Gadda-Da-Vida" / "Apache"	―	―	―	―
"—" denotes singles that did not chart.
