= Dyke and the Blazers =

American funk band

Background information
- Origin: Buffalo, New York, U.S.
- Genre: Funk
- Years active: 1965–1971
- Labels: Artco, Original Sound
- Spinoff of: Carl LaRue and his Crew
- Past members: Arlester "Dyke" Christian; Alvester "Pig" Jacobs; J.V. Hunt; Bernard Williams; Richard Cason; Rodney Brown; Alvin Battle; Willie Earl; Wardell "Baby Wayne" Peterson; Otis Tolliver; Ray Byrd; Maurice "Little Mo" Jones

Dyke and the Blazers was an American funk band led by Arlester Christian. The band was formed in 1965, and recorded up until Christian's death in 1971. Among their most successful records were the original version of "Funky Broadway" (1966) and "Let a Woman Be a Woman" (1969).

== Career ==
Arlester Christian (June 13, 1943 – March 13, 1971), nicknamed "Dyke", was born (according to most sources) in Buffalo, New York. He attended Burgard High School. In 1960, he started playing bass in a Buffalo band, Carl LaRue and his Crew, who played local bars and clubs and released a single, "Please Don't Drive Me Away", on the KKC label in March 1962. In 1964, LaRue was invited by Phoenix, Arizona-based disc jockey, Eddie O'Jay, to take his band to that city, to provide the backing for the vocal group that he managed there, The O'Jays. By 1965, however, the O'Jays and their manager had moved elsewhere, and LaRue's band fell apart. LaRue returned to Buffalo, but Christian and two other members of the band, guitarist Alvester "Pig" Jacobs and saxophonist J.V. Hunt, had no means of traveling and stayed in Phoenix. They joined forces with an existing Phoenix group, The Three Blazers, who included tenor saxophonist Bernard Williams, and, as "Dyke and the Blazers", added local musicians Rich Cason (organ) and Rodney Brown (drums). Playing in local clubs, the group picked up on the rhythms, bass and organ innovations of James Brown's band, and through improvisation developed a riff-based song that became "Funky Broadway", the lyrics reflecting singer Dyke's memories of Broadway in Buffalo as well as Broadway Road in Phoenix.

In summer 1966, the band were heard by Art Barrett, who became their manager and had them record the song at the Audio Recorders Studio in Phoenix. Barrett released the record on his own Artco label, with Christian credited as its writer although other band members later claimed that they had contributed to the song. It became popular locally, and was reissued by Art Laboe's Original Sound label in Los Angeles. The record steadily climbed the Billboard R&B chart early in 1967, reaching no. 17 in a 24-week stay on the chart, and also reached no. 65 on the pop chart. The record was the first to use the word "funky" in its title, and for that reason was banned by some radio stations as offensive. Its music was described by Rick James as "revolutionary", and Dyke developed a dance routine to go with it. The band added bass player Alvin Battle, freeing Dyke to concentrate on vocals, and toured widely on the back of its success. However, in the summer of 1967, the stresses of playing a series of engagements at the Apollo Theater in Harlem caused the band to split up, shortly before Wilson Pickett had a bigger hit with his own cover version of "Funky Broadway". Pickett's recording reached no. 1 on the R&B chart and no. 8 on the pop chart.

Dyke returned to Buffalo, and put together a new touring band, including Willie Earl (drums - previously a member of Carl LaRue's band), Wardell "Baby Wayne" Peterson (second drummer), Otis Tolliver (bass), Ray Byrd (keyboards), and Maurice "Little Mo" Jones (trumpet). However, the touring band gradually disintegrated in 1968 and 1969. After 1968, Christian made Dyke and the Blazers records with a variety of Los Angeles studio musicians, later known as the Watts 103rd Street Rhythm Band. That outfit included drummer James Gadson, who also performed with Charles Wright and Bill Withers, guitarists Al McKay and Roland Bautista, who later became members of Earth, Wind & Fire, and bassists James Smith and Melvin Dunlap. The resulting records, including "We Got More Soul" (no. 7 R&B, no. 35 pop) and "Let A Woman Be A Woman, Let A Man Be A Man" (no. 4 R&B, no. 36 pop), were among his biggest hits. Most of the singles resulted from lengthy jam sessions that were edited down to fit the format of 45 rpm records. Dyke and the Blazers continued to have less sizeable hits into 1970, with a style described by critic Richie Unterberger as "gut-bucket funk... with scratchy guitar riffs, greasy organ, hoarse vocals, and jazzy horns".

== Death of Arlester Christian ==
Christian was preparing for a tour of England and for recording with Barry White when he was fatally shot on a Phoenix street, on March 13, 1971, at the age of 27. According to reports at the time, the killing may have been related to drug dealing, although a coroner's report showed no alcohol or narcotics in his system. However, on April 22, 1971 Jet Magazine quoted Phoenix detective Eloy Ysasi as saying, "Dyke was a drug addict and had so many tracks on his arms you couldn't believe it." The shooting, by Clarence Daniels, was considered self-defense.

== Legacy ==
Dyke and the Blazers were inducted to the Arizona Music & Entertainment Hall of Fame.

The song "Let a Woman Be a Woman" has been sampled by the hip-hop performer Tupac Shakur for his song "If my Homie Calls", and the band Stetsasonic for their song "Sally", and English indie rockers The Heavy for their own "How You Like Me Now?". "Let a Woman Be a Woman" was also featured in the film Friends with Benefits. The musician Prince refers to "Let a Woman Be a Woman" in his song "Gett Off".

For Mad Monster Party?, they recorded "The Mummy", voicing the animated skeletal rock band Little Tibia and the Fibias.

Compilations of Dyke and The Blazers recordings have been issued on CD by Kent Records and Ace Records.

== Discography ==
=== Chart singles ===
| Year | Single | Chart Positions | |
| Year | Single | US Pop | US R&B |
|---|---|---|---|
| 1967 | "Funky Broadway - Part 1" | 65 | 17 |
| 1967 | "So Sharp" | 130 | 41 |
| 1968 | "Funky Walk Part 1 (East)" | 67 | 22 |
| 1969 | "We Got More Soul" | 35 | 7 |
| 1969 | "Let a Woman Be a Woman" | 36 | 4 |
| 1970 | "Uhh" | 118 | 20 |
| 1970 | "You Are My Sunshine" | 121 | 30 |
| 1970 | "Runaway People" | 119 | 32 |

=== Albums ===
- Funky Broadway (Original Sound. 1967, No. 186 US)
- Dykes' Greatest Hits – We Got More Soul (Original Sound, 1969 compilation)
- So Sharp! (Kent [UK], 1983 compilation)
- Dyke's Greatest Hits – We Got More Soul (Century, 1992 compilation)
- The Funky Broadway: The Very Best of Dyke & the Blazers (Collectables, 1999 compilation)
- We Got More Soul (The Ultimate Broadway Funk) [2-CD] (BGP/Beat Goes Public, 2007 compilation)
- Dyke's Greatest Hits – The Complete Singles (online only, 2013 compilation)
- Rarities, Volume 1 – Phoenix to Hollywood (2013 compilation)
- Rarities, Volume 2 – The Funky Combinations (2013 compilation)
- Down on Funky Broadway: Phoenix 1966–1967 [2-LP] (Craft, 2021 compilation)
- I Got a Message: Hollywood 1968–1970 [2-LP] (Craft, 2021 compilation)
