= Bongo Rock (instrumental) =

Single by Preston Epps

from the album Bongo Bongo Bongo
- B-side: "Bongo Party"
- Released: April 1959
- Genre: Instrumental rock
- Length: 2:00
- Label: Original Sound; 4
- Songwriters: Preston Epps; Arthur Egnoian

"Bongo Rock" is a rock and roll instrumental recorded by Preston Epps, written by Epps and Arthur Egnoian. Released as a single in 1959, it charted #14 Pop in the United States, and #4 in Canada. It was included in Epps' 1960 album Bongo Bongo Bongo.

The Surfaris' 1963 hit single "Wipe Out" was based on this song.

== Track listing ==
7-inch single

Side A

1. "Bongo Rock" (Preston Epps, Arthur Egnoian) – 2:00

Side B

1. "Bongo Party" (Egnoian) – 2:02

== Charts ==
| Chart (1959) | Peak position |
|---|---|
| US Billboard Hot 100 | 14 |

== Incredible Bongo Band version ==
"Bongo Rock"

Single by Incredible Bongo Band

from the album Bongo Rock
- B-side: "Bongolia"
- Released: 1973
- Length: 2:36
- Label: Pride/MGM
- Songwriters: Preston Epps; Arthur Egnoian
- Producer: Michael Viner

Incredible Bongo Band singles chronology
| "Bongo Rock" (1973) | "Let There Be Drums" (1973) |

Incredible Bongo Band recorded a cover version of "Bongo Rock", which charted #57 in the United States. It was included in the band's 1973 album Bongo Rock under the title "Bongo Rock '73". DJ Kool Herc used it in his sets. It gained significant popularity in early hip hop circles as a breakbeat.

The song reached #20 on Canadian charts, partly because the producers registered it as Canadian content with MAPL certification. This is despite the fact that the recording had been made in Los Angeles by an entirely American line-up of musicians (Ed Greene, Wilton Felder, Joe Sample, David T. Walker, Bobbye Hall, and Dean Parks). The song's MAPL certification helped push it up the charts in Canada. It reached #25 on the Canadian AC charts.

=== Track listing ===
7-inch single

Side A

1. "Bongo Rock" (Preston Epps, Arthur Egnoian) – 2:36

Side B

1. "Bongolia" (Perry Botkin Jr.) – 2:14

=== Charts ===
| Chart (1973) | Peak position |
|---|---|
| US Billboard Hot 100 | 57 |
