= Kevin Deverich =

American businessman

- Died: September 29, 2006
- Occupations: Businessman, music manager, publicist, agent, Hotel executive
- Years active: 1960s to 2006
- Known for: Manager of Eric Burdon & the Animals, Sean Bonniwell; Merv Griffin Hotel chain
- Spouse: Amanda
- Children: 2

Kevin Deverich had careers in both music and later hotel management on an executive level. The music acts he managed were Eric Burdon & the Animals, The Music Machine and Sean Bonniwell. Later, moving into the hotel business, his career included working for Merv Griffin's hotel chain.

== Background ==
He was born in Beverly Hills, California. He attended the International School in Geneva, Switzerland. He also attended the London School of Economics and Wharton School of Management. In London he became involved with rock music bands. During the 1960s, his career in music included managing Eric Burdon & the Animals, and Sean Bonniwell.

During his hotel career, he was general manager of the Capital Hilton, and an executive with Merv Griffin's hotel chain, which included the Beverly Hilton. He spent a decade running the company, and would later end up heading Crown Realty & Development.

== Music career ==
By April, 1967, he was managing The Music Machine. In 1968, he became the manager for Eric Burdon and the new Animals when they became unhappy over money that had been promised to them by manager Mike Jeffery, so they fired him and took Deverich on as their new manager. This happened in April. Deverich was just managing the US side of their career but took on the role to manage them internationally.

He was responsible for the group signed Blues Image being signed to the Atco label.

=== David Kevin Deverich & Associates ===
As of July 1968, his operation was located on the West Coast on 8818 Sunset Boulevard, Los Angeles.

By May, 1969, he had seven new acts under his roster which included Danny McCullough and Hilton Valentine from Great Britain. On the US end was Sean Bonniwell and another act called Mosaic Tweed. Mosaic Tweed would release a single "You And Me" bw "Comin' Home" on Capitol in July that year. There was also a duo consisting of Brad Truitt and Billy Woodruff on the Kevin Deverich and Assoc. talent roster. About two years prior to coming on board with Kevin Deverich & Associates, Truitt a.k.a. Brad Jose was one of the acts appearing at Jim Wright's Club Tiki on North Fair Oaks. Later in the seventies, Truitt would find work as an actor, acting in a Los Angeles production of The Tooth of Crime with James Keach and playing characters such as Foster Bridges in "Web of Death", an episode of Kojak.

== Hotel career ==
By early 1992, he was the general manager of Merv Griffin's Beverly Hilton Hotel. he would then spend a decade at the top of the hotel chain. In 2000, according to an article by Slate in its May 8 issue, it was a bit of a mystery as to where Deverich was now working. It was reported by The Los Angeles Times in its December 5, 2003 issue that he was working for Crown Realty & Development where he was in charge of hotel acquisitions. By August 2004, he had been appointed vice president of Crown Realty & Development's newly formed hotel division.

== Death ==
He died suddenly at his home on September 29, 2006, leaving behind his wife Amanda and two young daughters.
