= Funky Broadway =

"Funky Broadway – Part I"

Single by Dyke and the Blazers

from the album Funky Broadway
- B-side: "Funky Broadway – Part II"
- Released: 1966
- Recorded: 1966
- Genre: Funk
- Length: 2:30
- Label: Artco
- Songwriter(s): Arlester "Dyke" Christian
- Producer(s): Desert Sound

Dyke and the Blazers singles chronology
"Funky Broadway – Part I" (1966)	"So Sharp" (1967)

"Funky Broadway" is an early funk-style song written by Arlester "Dyke" Christian. In 1966, he recorded it with his band, Dyke & the Blazers. The small, Phoenix, Arizona-based, Artco Records first issued it as a two-part single; when it was unable to keep up with the demand, the distribution was picked up by the Original Sound label. The single performed well on both the Top Selling R&B Singles and Hot 100 charts compiled by Billboard magazine, reaching numbers 17 and 65 respectively.

== Wilson Pickett rendition ==
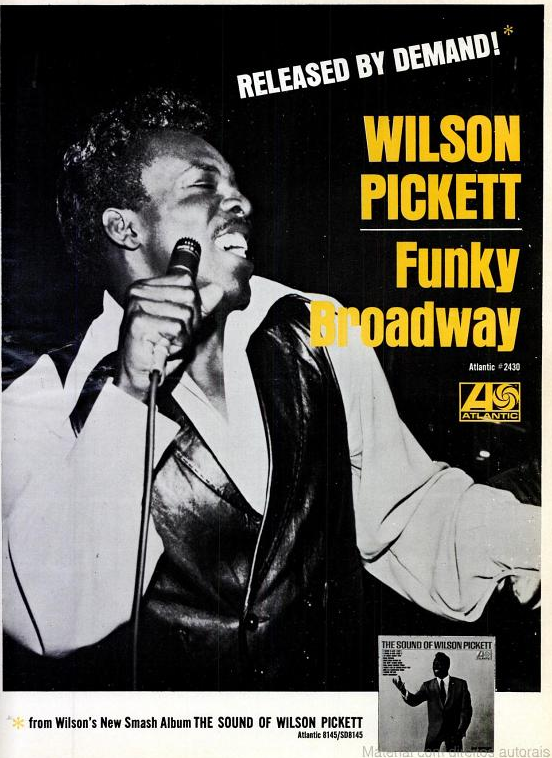

In 1967, several months after the original, Wilson Pickett recorded "Funky Broadway". Produced by Jerry Wexler for Atlantic Records, the session took place in Muscle Shoals, Alabama. Pickett only recorded the first half of the song, with "I'm Sorry About That" used as the B-side.

Whereas the original made a decent showing on the charts, Pickett's version "became the definitive hit version", which reached numbers one and eight on the R&B and Hot 100 charts. Described as a "funky tune" and an "absolutely classic, wailing read", it is also included on The Sound of Wilson Pickett album, issued by Atlantic in 1967. The session personnel on the Pickett recording included Charles Chalmers and James Mitchell on tenor sax, Tommy Cogbill on bass, Roger Hawkins on drums, Jimmy Johnson and Chips Moman on guitar, Gene "Bowlegs" Miller on trumpet, Floyd Newman on baritone sax, and Spooner Oldham on keyboards.
