= Late Night Berlin =

German late-night talk show

- Directed by: Klaas Heufer-Umlauf
- Presented by: Klaas Heufer-Umlauf
- Starring: Jakob Lundt (sidekick); Gloria with Mark Tavassol (house band)
- Opening theme: The Heavy – "What Makes a Good Man?"
- Composer: Mark Tavassol
- No. of seasons: 14
- No. of episodes: 185

Production
- Production locations: Studio Berlin-Adlershof; (Berlin-Adlershof)
- Running time: 55 minutes (with commercials)
- Production company: Florida TV

Original release
- Network: ProSieben
- Release: March 12, 2018 – March 25, 2025

Late Night Berlin (abbreviated LNB) was a German late-night talk show hosted by Klaas Heufer-Umlauf on ProSieben. The show premiered on March 12, 2018, and was produced by Florida TV.

== Concept ==
The concept of the show included the classic elements of a late-night talk show such as stand-up, interviews with celebrity guests and a musical appearance. There were also recurring segments. The show had a studio band, led by Mark Tavassol. While the house band's name changed throughout the show's existence, it is in fact the band Gloria. The Florida TV author and producer Jakob Lundt appeared as a sidekick.

=== Show structure ===
At the beginning of an episode Heufer-Umlauf performed a traditional stand-up monologue, before changing to a seated. After that one of various recurring segments appears, followed by the first of the episode's guests, which usually included celebrities and actors, literary figures, people in fashion, artists, athletes, and politicians. The guest may return after a second recurring segments and at the episode's end followed by a musical guest.

== Production ==
Already in July 2017 ProSieben announced a new weekly comedy show with Klaas Heufer-Umlauf for Spring 2018. At the beginning of February 2018 it was finally announced that the late-night show named Late Night Berlin premiered on March 12, 2018.

In 2018, Late Night Berlin was not recorded in Berlin as the title suggests. However, since its 3rd season began in 2019, it is now filmed at the eastern side of Berlin. This programme is produced by Florida TV, and its 4th season will be returned on September 23, just after summer break.

In 2021, just before days of 2021 German federal election (on Sept. 26), on September 14, this show has successfully returned into its 8th season. This show is to be broadcast every Tuesday at 22:30.

== Episodes ==
Late Night Berlin

No.	Original release date	Guest(s)	Musical/entertainment guest(s)
1	March 12, 2018	Anne Will	Casper feat. Ahzumjot
171 Tage – Im Laberinth der Macht (with Heinz Strunk and Kevin Kühnert): a sketch about German Government formation 2017/18
2	March 19, 2018	Heike Makatsch, Jessica Schwarz	Tocotronic
Music video: Smart Home H**ensohn, Das kleine Helene-Fischer-Quiz

== Reception ==
=== Ratings ===
No. in series	Air date	Viewers (in millions)		Share		Source
No. in series	Air date	all	14–49 years	all	14–49 years	Source
1	March 12, 2018	0.75 Mio.	0.58 Mio.	5.3%	12.1%	
2	March 19, 2018	0.70 Mio.	0.57 Mio.	4.6%	10.7%	
