= Teen Beat (song) =

Single by Sandy Nelson

from the album Sandy Nelson Plays Teen Beat
- B-side: "Big Jump"
- Released: 1959
- Genre: Instrumental
- Length: 2:22 (single version); 2:55 (album version)
- Label: Original Sound Records
- Songwriters: Arthur Egnoian & Sandy Nelson (Teen Beat); Arthur Egnoian (Big Jump)

Sandy Nelson singles chronology
"Teen Beat" (1959)	"Drum Party" (1960)

"Teen Beat" is a 1959 instrumental number by Sandy Nelson. Released on Original Sound Records, it rose to number 4 on the Billboard Hot 100 chart in 1959. It sold over one million copies, and was awarded a gold disc. In addition, the song made #17 on the R&B Singles Chart and #9 on the UK Singles Chart. The song also made #36 on the Billboard Year-End Hot 100 singles of 1959. The guitar was played on the recording by co-writer Richard Podolor, later a songwriter and record producer, and the piano was played by Bruce Johnston, a future member of The Beach Boys.

A re-recorded version, released as a single in 1964 and titled "Teen Beat '65", also made the Billboard and Cashbox charts.

DTV, in 1984, set the instrumental number to the playing cards from Alice in Wonderland and Thru the Mirror.
