= Close (Sean Bonniwell album) =

Studio album by Sean Bonniwell
- Released: August 4, 1969
- Recorded: May – July 1969, Capitol Records Studios
- Genres: Folk rock; soft rock
- Length: 34:53
- Label: Capitol
- Producer: Vic Briggs

Sean Bonniwell chronology
The Bonniwell Music Machine (1968)	Close (1969)

Singles from Close
- 1. "Where Am I to Go" Released: May 15, 1969

Close is a solo album by American rock musician Sean Bonniwell, credited under the moniker T. S. Bonniwell, who had been the creative force behind the innovative garage rock band The Music Machine. The album was released on August 4, 1969, by Capitol Records (see 1969 in music). It marked a total departure from Bonniwell's rebellious protopunk period with The Music Machine, to a soft rock crooning style. In addition, the album blended folk rock and orchestrated influences, and was inspired by Bonniwell's stints in the pre-Music Machine groups, the Wayfarers and the Ragamuffins, along with his desire to be more poetically inclined. The song,"Where Am I to Go", was released as a single ahead of the album, but failed to chart. Like its attendant single, Close was also somewhat commercially unsuccessful, and was the last recording by Bonniwell for the next 20 years.

== Background ==
Recording sessions for the album began in mid-1969, and took place in Capitol Recording Studios in Los Angeles, with former guitarist of Eric Burdon and the Animals, Vic Briggs, producing and Paul Buff engineering. Sean Bonniwell was occupied with selling the rights to his former band, The Music Machine, to get out of his recording contract with Warner Bros. Records in the early part of 1969 and, consequently, there was a lack of properly arranged new material for the album. Bonniwell's departure was marked by the limitations to song selections and managerial conflicts. Through a producer from his previous recording company, Bonniwell was signed to Capitol Records under the assertion he was given total control of the album's output. As a result, he was given time to improvise and arrange in the studio, with Briggs playing a pivotal role in enabling Bonniwell to complete the recording sessions under his own terms. Briggs was also instrumental in arranging the orchestrations that complimented much of Bonniwell's lyrical content. The project's only credited songwriter, Bonniwell, recalled the importance of Briggs's contributions to Close during an interview with music historian, Peter Sjoblom: "Vic was a God-send; he insisted I sing and play the songs live for him, two or three at a time, in the late afternoon, near dusk, at his hillside cottage in the Canyon. Basically, he took it from there. As we progressed so did our collaboration.... When the basic tracks were satisfactory he added the orchestration: To say we were on the same page is an understatement." The two songs, "Where Am I to Go" and "Something to Be", were the only exceptions as they were arranged by Bonniwell with session musicians during his time with The Music Machine.

Among the tracks that were recorded for the album were Bonniwell's compositions "She Is" and "Black Snow", which had been recorded by The Music Machine, but had not been released at the time because of their somber contrast to the band's hard-edge sound. "Black Snow" saw an appearance among others of the band's rarities on the 2000 album Ignition. Bonniwell moved away from the gritty psychedelic rock experimentation, in the group in favor of melancholy folk rock songs, reminiscent of his time as a folk musician, and influenced by lounge music, bossa nova, and flamenco. Richie Unterberger, writing for the Allmusic website, described the album as "...quite subdued, orchestrated singer/songwriter pop, verging on easy listening at times in its arrangements. The gravel-growl that Bonniwell employed for the likes of 'Talk Talk' was totally absent, as he concentrated solely on the sweet, delicate, crooning aspects of his voice." The tracks "Who Remembers" and "Temporary Knife" featured contributions from voice artist Sharon Hicks, who possessed uniquely high vocals.

Close was released on August 4, 1969, but its distribution suffered from only being issued to California and from lack of promotion. Nonetheless, it successfully expanded Bonniwell's musical prowess, and displayed his versatility as a vocalist. However, feeling disillusioned with the music industry, Bonniwell took a long hiatus from recording, and lived a nomadic lifestyle, or as Bonniwell said, "my transcendentalized western guru period", which made Close his last album for the next 20 years. Although it, and its single "What Am I to Do", failed to chart and had gone out of print by the early 1970s, the album's reputation has grown over the years. By the mid-1980s, a revival of interest in Bonniwell's music with The Music Machine had begun, and accordingly Close was met with intrigue. Finally, in 2000 the album was first reissued by Collectables Records, and was rereleased by Real Gone Records in 2012.

== Track listing ==
All tracks were composed by Sean Bonniwell.

=== Side one ===
1. "Where Am I to Go" – 2:52
2. "Love Is Such a Simple Word" – 3:12
3. "Who Remembers" – 2:40
4. "Something to Be" – 3:07
5. "Black Snow" – 4:00

=== Side two ===
1. "She Is" – 3:06
2. "Temporary Knife" – 2:50
3. "Continue" – 2:57
4. "Where It Belongs" – 2:11
5. "But Not with My Heart " – 2:57
6. "Sleep" – 4:17

== Personnel ==
- Sean Bonniwell – vocals, acoustic guitar
- Sharon Hicks – vocals, bass guitar
- Lyle Ritz – bass guitar
- Jim Gordon – drums
- Bill Hinshaw – French horn
- Steve Lester – lead guitar
- Vic Briggs – guitar on "Something to Be"
- Virgil Evans – trumpet
- Fleetfoot – 12-string guitar
