= The People in Me =

Single by the Music Machine

from the album (Turn On) The Music Machine
- B-side: "Masculine Intuition"
- Released: January 21, 1967
- Recorded: August 1966
- Studio: RCA (Los Angeles, California)
- Genre: Garage rock; psychedelic rock; proto-punk
- Length: 3:01
- Label: Original Sound
- Songwriter(s): Sean Bonniwell
- Producer(s): Brian Ross

The Music Machine singles chronology
"Talk Talk" (1966)	"The People in Me" (1967)	"Double Yellow Line" (1967)

"The People in Me" is a song by the American garage rock band the Music Machine, written by Sean Bonniwell, and first released as a track on their debut studio album (Turn On) The Music Machine in December 1966 on Original Sound Records.

== Background ==
The song was also released as the A-side to the group's second single, which was distributed on January 21, 1967. Like many of Bonniwell's compositions, "The People in Me"'s lyrical content featured a gloomy rebellious mood, with eerie lead vocals by Bonniwell, and it explored with a hard-edged variation of psychedelic rock. It also featured guitarist Mark Landon's wiry distorted guitar melodies, joined by backing vocals near the conclusion of the song. Though it was considered a strong follow-up to their debut release "Talk Talk", the song suffered from inadequate airplay when the band's management angered radio producers for exclusively airing the single on a rival station. Bonniwell would pen much more experimental compositions, but the dispute damaged The Music Machine's prospects for another charting hit.

== Personnel ==
- Sean Bonniwell - lead vocals
- Mark Landon - lead guitar, backing vocals
- Keith Olsen - bass guitar, backing vocals
- Ron Edgar - drums
- Doug Rhodes - keyboards

== Chart performance ==
"The People in Me", with the flip side "Masculine Intutition", was the final Music Machine single to chart on the Billboard Hot 100, where it peaked at number 66.

Chart (1967)	Peak position
Canada RPM Top 100	62
US Billboard Hot 100	66
