= Michael Viner =

American record producer (1944-2009)

- Born: February 27, 1944; Washington, D.C., USA
- Died: August 8, 2009 (aged 65) Beverly Hills, California, USA
- Occupations: Film producer, record producer, musician

Michael Ames Viner (/ˈviːnər/ VEE-nər; February 27, 1944 – August 8, 2009) was an American film producer and record producer, who later shifted into book publishing and became an innovator in the audiobook field. A widely sampled percussion break in the recording of the song "Apache" by the Incredible Bongo Band, a group he assembled in the early 1970s, has been frequently integrated into many hip hop recordings.

== Early life ==
Viner was born in Washington, D.C., the son of Jeanne (née Spitzel) and Melvin Viner. Viner attended the Chadwick School in Palos Verdes, California, majored in English at Harvard University, and studied at the School of Foreign Service at Georgetown University. He worked on Robert F. Kennedy's 1968 presidential campaign. Viner began his entertainment industry career working summers during high school in the mail room at Twentieth Century Fox; after Kennedy's assassination, he worked for movie studios, and ran a record division called Pride for MGM. He was the producer of the inaugural ball for President Richard Nixon in 1973.

== Record producing ==
Viner produced a record in 1970 called The Best of Marcel Marceau, a joke album produced for under $50 and consisting of nineteen minutes of silence followed by one minute of applause on each side of the record, purportedly recording performances by the famous mime artist Marcel Marceau, his name intentionally misspelled on the album for unstated reasons. The album led to a production deal with Mike Curb at MGM Records, where he helped produce a cover version of "The Candy Man", which was a chart-topping hit for Sammy Davis Jr. in 1972.

He assembled the Incredible Bongo Band in 1972, which produced an album that was the soundtrack for that year's science fiction film The Thing with Two Heads, consisting of remakes of instrumental songs from the 1950s and 1960s given a characteristic funk style, and achieving a hit with "Bongo Rock", a remake of a 1959 song by Preston Epps. That success led Viner to produce Bongo Rock, another album for the group, that included "Apache", a remake of the instrumental which was originally a 1960 UK hit for The Shadows and in 1961 a US hit for guitarist Jørgen Ingmann. In the late 1970s, hip hop artists started sampling the Incredible Bongo Band recording, with the percussion breakdown from "Apache" appearing in songs by DJ Kool Herc, L.L. Cool J and Nas, as well as Moby. Among the artists he signed at MGM Records was Debby Boone, who would have a hit in 1977 with "You Light Up My Life".

== Publishing and audiobooks ==
Viner married actress Deborah Raffin in 1974 (they divorced in 2005). He and Raffin opened Dove Books-on-Tape in 1985 in the garage of their Coldwater Canyon home. Viner had won an $8,000 bet in a backgammon game with the author Sidney Sheldon; rather than taking the money, Viner asked Sheldon to let him publish two of his books as audiobooks. Although Viner became known for publishing sensational tabloid-style books such as You'll Never Make Love in This Town Again and Faye Resnick's book about Nicole Brown Simpson, among Dove's first successes was the audiobook of Stephen Hawking's A Brief History of Time. The company grew to become a serious competitor of the more established publishers in the audiobook business.

After suffering some financial setbacks, Viner and Raffin sold Dove in 1997 and later obtained a large legal malpractice judgment against their own lawyers relating to this transaction, but after a lengthy appeals process, the judgment was overturned. They founded New Millennium Entertainment, which filed for bankruptcy after a jury ordered it to pay $2.8 million in a highly publicized lawsuit with author and editor Otto Penzler. In 2005 Viner established another company, Phoenix Books. Viner sold Phoenix to Dwight D. Opperman in 2007 but stayed on as its president. Viner died in Beverly Hills, California, at age 65 on August 8, 2009, due to cancer.

== Appearances in television and film ==
Viner appeared in a 1970 episode of To Tell the Truth, surrounded by two imposters, each claiming to be the producer of the album The Best of Marcel Marceau. None of the celebrity panelists correctly guessed him to be the real Michael Viner, instead opting to vote for the two imposters.

The 2013 documentary Sample This recounts the story of Viner and The Incredible Bongo Band.
