= Let There Be Drums =

Single by Sandy Nelson

from the album Let There Be Drums
- B-side: "Quite a Beat"
- Released: September 1961 [U.S.]
- Genre: Instrumental rock
- Length: 2:14
- Label: Imperial X5775
- Songwriters: Sandy Nelson, Richard Podolor

Sandy Nelson singles chronology
"Big Noise from the Jungle" (1961)	"Let There Be Drums" (1961)	"Drums Are My Beat" (1962)

"Let There Be Drums" is a 1961 instrumental composed by American drummer Sandy Nelson and guitarist Richard Podolor, who later became a record producer.

== Background ==
The piece is a guitar and drums duet and is an early example of surf music, although it got categorized as that genre in later years.

== Chart performance ==
It was released as a Sandy Nelson single on Imperial Records X5775 and became a chart hit, reaching No.7 on the U.S. Billboard Hot 100 and No.9 on the U.S. Cash Box charts (weeks of 24 December and 16 December 1961), and No. 8 in Canada (weeks of 4 December and 11 December 1961). Nelson's "Let There Be Drums" was an Australian No.1 single for a week (week of 20 January 1962) and peaked at No.3 on the U.K. singles chart during the weeks of 4–10 January and 18–24 January 1962, becoming the 50th best-selling single in the U.K. during the calendar year 1962. The Song peaked at no. 4 on the New Zealand Lever hit parade charts.

== Cover versions ==
The Incredible Bongo Band's rendition of this instrumental was the theme music for Atlantic Grand Prix Wrestling telecasts on the former ATV network in Maritime Canada during the 1970s and the 1980s. The song reached #66 on the Canadian RPM charts. It was also featured in "The Tenth Inning", an episode of Ken Burns' Baseball.

Bev Bevan, then drummer of Electric Light Orchestra, covered the song as his first and the last solo single in 1976.

In 2025 a group of musicians including Hank Marvin and Roger Taylor recorded a version of "Let There Be Drums" in support of the Cure Parkinson's charity.
