= Perry Botkin Jr. =

American composer, producer, arranger, and musician (1933–2021)

- Born: April 16, 1933; New York City, New York
- Died: January 18, 2021 (aged 87); Burbank, California
- Occupation: Composer

Perry Botkin Jr. (April 16, 1933 – January 18, 2021) was an American composer, producer, arranger, and musician.

== Life and career ==
He was born in 1933 in New York City, the son of Perry Botkin Sr., who also was a successful musician and composer.

Botkin had a successful career in music for more than forty years. As an arranger, he worked with Bobby Darin, Harry Nilsson, Gary Crosby, The Lettermen, Ed Ames, Shelby Flint and Harpers Bizarre, among others. The film scores that he composed are similar to the music of his partner and counterpart, Barry De Vorzon.

The tune "Nadia's Theme", composed by Botkin and Barry De Vorzon, peaked at No. 6 in Canada and No. 8 on the Billboard Hot 100 in 1976 and became the theme song for the long-running television soap opera The Young and the Restless. He was also a major contributor to Incredible Bongo Band, one of the most influential groups of all-time for its Bongo Rock album which is one of the most sampled from records, making it a major influence in the origins of Hip hop.

In 1990, Botkin retired from the commercial music industry, and began self-producing CDs of electronic music. James Harbert, in the liner notes for the first of these recordings, says, "With these new musical works, Perry Botkin has achieved his musical goal. He has succeeded in being himself."

== Death ==
Botkin died on January 18, 2021, at age 87, at Providence Saint Joseph Medical Center in Burbank, California.

== Awards ==
- 1971 - Academy Award nomination - Best Song, "Bless the Beasts and Children", with Barry DeVorzon
- 1977 - Grammy Award winner - Best Instrumental Arrangement - "Nadia's Theme (The Young and the Restless)", with Barry DeVorzon and Harry Betts

== Works (partial) ==
=== Recordings ===
- 1957 - "Passion Flower" with Gil Garfield, as The Fraternity Brothers. (Verve, V-10081)
- 1964 - "Sabato Sera" / "La Prima Che Incontro" with Gil Garfield, as Gil Fields e I Fraternity Brothers. (Derby/CGD, DB 5074) Nominated on The Sanremo Music Festival 1964
- 1969 - "Love Is Blue" with Johnny Gibbs, Frank De Vol, Norman Percival, Hank Levine, Les Reed, Billy May, Bill Walker, Nelson Riddle, Pete King, Frank Comstock. (Reader's Digest, RDA 77-A)
- 1976 - "Nadia's Theme" with Barry DeVorzon. (A&M Records, AM 1856)

=== Recordings (arranger) ===
- Hollyridge Strings - The Beatles Songbook Vol.4 album (co-arranger/conductor (with Mort Garson)
- Incredible Bongo Band - Bongo Rock album
- Incredible Bongo Band - The Return of the Incredible Bongo Band album
- Bobby Darin - In a Broadway Bag album
- The Cascades - "Rhythm of the Rain"
- Robin Ward - "Wonderful Summer"
- Shelby Flint - "Angel on My Shoulder"
- The T-Bones - "No Matter What Shape (Your Stomach's In)"
- José Feliciano - "Feliz Navidad"
- Harry Nilsson - Pandemonium Shadow Show album
- Carly Simon - Playing Possum album
- Barbra Streisand - Stoney End album
- Maureen McGovern - Academy Award Performance album
- Checkmates Ltd. - Love Is All We Have to Give album, including "Black Pearl"

=== Films ===
- R. P. M. (1970) (with Barry DeVorzon)
- Bless the Beasts and Children (1971) (with Barry DeVorzon)
- Skyjacked (1972)
- They Only Kill Their Masters (1972)
- Lady Ice (1973)
- Your Three Minutes Are Up (1973)
- Goin' South (1978) (with Van Dyke Parks)
- Tarzan, the Ape Man (1981)
- Dance of the Dwarfs (1983)
- Silent Night, Deadly Night (1984)
- Weekend Warriors (1986)

=== Television ===
- ABC Movie of the Week (theme)
- The Young And The Restless (theme)
- Mork & Mindy (series)
- Happy Days (series)
- Laverne & Shirley (series)
- The Smothers Brothers Show (sitcom)
- The Beverly Hillbillies (sitcom)
- Quark (series)
- 3rd Degree (game show)
