= Great Vengeance and Furious Fire =

Studio album by The Heavy
- Released: 17 September 2007
- Recorded: 2007
- Genre: Indie rock; neo-soul
- Length: 33:36
- Label: Counter
- Producer: Corin Dingley; The Heavy

The Heavy chronology
Great Vengeance and Furious Fire (2007)	The House That Dirt Built (2009)

Professional ratings
Review scores
Source	Rating
AllMusic	link
Blender	link
PopMatters	7/10 stars

Great Vengeance and Furious Fire is the debut studio album by English rock band The Heavy, released 17 September 2007 in the United Kingdom and 8 April 2008 in the United States. The album was released by Ninja Tune's new rock-based imprint Counter Records. The title is a reference to a line spoken by Samuel L. Jackson's character Jules Winnfield in Pulp Fiction.

== Track listing ==
No.	Title	Length
1.	"That Kind of Man"	3:31
2.	"Coleen"	2:59
3.	"Set Me Free"	3:35
4.	"You Don't Know"	3:16
5.	"Girl"	2:46
6.	"Doing Fine"	4:28
7.	"Our Special Place"	2:49
8.	"Brukpocket's Lament"	2:50
9.	"Dignity"	2:26
10.	"Who Needs the Sunshine"	4:11
Total length:		33:36
