= How You Like Me Now? =

2009 song by The Heavy

Single by The Heavy

from the album The House That Dirt Built
- B-side: "Tell It Like It Is"; Remixes
- Released: August 2009
- Studio: Toybox (Bristol, England); State of the Ark (Richmond, England)
- Genre: Indie rock; funk rock; neo soul
- Length: 3:40 (album version); 3:11 (radio edit)
- Label: Counter
- Songwriters: Arlester Christian; Chris Ellul; Spencer Page; Kelvin Swaby; Daniel Taylor
- Producer: Jim Abbiss

The Heavy singles chronology
"Sixteen" (2009)	"How You Like Me Now?" (2009)	"No Time" (2009)

How You Like Me Now?

EP by The Heavy
- Released: 29 November 2010
- Genre: Indie rock; funk rock; neo soul
- Length: 15:34
- Label: Ninja Tune
- Producer: Jim Abbiss

The Heavy chronology
The House That Dirt Built (2009)	How You Like Me Now? (2010)	The Glorious Dead (2012)

"How You Like Me Now?" is a song by English rock band The Heavy. It was released as the third single from their second studio album The House That Dirt Built in August 2009. The song interpolates "Let a Woman Be a Woman" by Dyke and the Blazers. The song has been used in media on countless occasions and peaked at number 122 on the Billboard Hot 100. The band also released another version of the song, featuring The Dap-Kings Horns.

== Composition ==
Singer Kelvin Swaby said the song is about "when you can take advantage of a situation, and it doesn't matter what you do. I'm trying to say that I've been really, really, really bad, you shouldn't love me after all. And I'm telling you I've done this and this and this, so how do you like me now? And it's almost like you're just being cocky with it, because you know that you can do it."

== Usage in media ==
"How You Like Me Now?" has been used in media an unusually large number of times, making it the band's signature song. It has been featured in several trailers and movies. It was used in the HBO series Entourage, in trailers for the 2012 movie Ted and The Transporter Refueled, in the closing credits for Horrible Bosses, in Horrible Bosses 2, in The Fighter, in This Means War, in G.I. Joe: Retaliation, in Klaus, and in Borderlands. It was also used in episodes of the TV series Suits and White Collar. The song was featured in the 2016 Warner Bros. animated film Storks, in which it is sung by Pigeon Toady (played by Stephen Kramer Glickman).

The song was featured in a 2010 advertisement called "Sock Puppets" introducing the newly redesigned Kia Sorento SUV. It has also been used in a 2019 Jeep commercial. It has also been used in the 2011 action adventure racing game Driver: San Francisco, in the closing credits for the 2012 role-playing first-person shooter Borderlands 2 and 2013 platform game Knack on the PlayStation 4, and in a TV spot for the 2013 animated movie Turbo. It was also featured in the ski film Attack of La Niña. In 2014 the song was featured on the in-game soundtrack of the racing game Forza Horizon 2 for Xbox One on the fictional radio station Ninja Tune Radio (as well as in the soundtrack of the game's standalone expansion Forza Horizon 2 Presents Fast & Furious for Xbox One and Xbox 360) and the official trailer of the comedy series Girl Meets World on Disney Channel in Southeast Asia. It also appeared in the multi-platform racing game The Crew on the fictional radio station 11 FM. It appeared at the end of "Social Psychology" in season 1 of the TV show Community. It also appeared in the ninth episode of the second season of White Collar, and in "The Originals", the twentieth episode of the fourth season of The Vampire Diaries. In 2023, it was featured in It's Always Sunny in Philadelphia in the seventh episode The Gang Goes Bowling of the sitcom's 16th season.

A remix of the song features in the video game LittleBigPlanet 3 while the original version appears near the end of the level "High Stakes Heist".

The song was also used as the theme song for Intentional Talk on MLB Network from the show's April 4, 2011 debut to April 1, 2016. A variant of this song called "How Do You Like Me Now (Beats Mix)" was performed by The Heavy and was prominently featured in the 2010 installment of Sony's venerable baseball video game franchise MLB The Show.

Beginning in the 2015-16 NHL season, the Vancouver Canucks played "How You Like Me Now" during home games at Rogers Arena whenever Radim Vrbata scored a goal, as part of their usage of personalized goal songs for each player. "How You Like Me Now" was selected for Vrbata's goal song in a fan vote, and was played during his goal celebrations up until his retirement in the 2017-18 NHL season.

In 2020, NASCAR used the song in promo commercials for the 2020 Daytona 500.

The song is currently played in Great American Ballpark whenever a member of the Cincinnati Reds hits a home run, replacing The Whip by Locksley.

== Track listing ==
=== 10-inch EP ===
- "How You Like Me Now? EP"

Side A
No.	Title	Length
1.	"How You Like Me Now?" (featuring The Dap-Kings Horns)	3:38
2.	"That Kind of Man"	3:32

Side B
No.	Title	Length
1.	"Big Bad Wolf"	2:36
2.	"Strong Enough"	2:48
3.	"Coleen" (featuring The Dap-Kings Horns)	3:00

=== 12-inch Remixes ===
- "How You Like Me Now? Remixes"

Side A
No.	Title	Length
1.	"How You Like Me Now?" (Joker Remix)

Side B
No.	Title	Length
1.	"How You Like Me Now?" (Solo Remix)
2.	"How You Like Me Now?" (Solo Dub)

== Charts ==
Chart (2009–10)	Peak position
Belgium (Ultratip Bubbling Under Flanders)	20
Netherlands (Single Top 100)	67
US Bubbling Under Hot 100 (Billboard)	22
US Heatseekers Songs (Billboard)	17
US Rock Digital Songs (Billboard)	19

== Certifications ==
Certifications for "How You Like Me Now?"
Region	Certification	Certified units/sales
United Kingdom (BPI)	Gold	400,000^{‡}
^{‡} Sales+streaming figures based on certification alone.
