= The House That Dirt Built =

Studio album by The Heavy
- Released: 5 October 2009
- Studio: Toybox Studios (Bristol); State of the Ark Studios (Richmond)
- Genre: Indie rock; garage rock; blues rock; neo soul
- Length: 38:06
- Label: Counter
- Producer: Jim Abbiss

The Heavy chronology
| Great Vengeance and Furious Fire (2007) | The House That Dirt Built (2009) | How You Like Me Now? (2010) |

Professional ratings
Review scores
| Source | Rating |
|---|---|
| Allmusic | 3.5/5 stars |
| Contact Music | 7/10 stars |
| PopMatters | 7/10 stars |

The House That Dirt Built is the second studio album by English rock band The Heavy. It was released on 5 October 2009. The title is a reference to the nursery rhyme This Is the House That Jack Built. Vocalist Kelvin Swaby explained in an interview with Songfacts that the song "Sixteen" was inspired by a time when he was working a lot as a DJ and he would see 16-year-old kids sneaking into clubs.

The album's songs were used for several video games and films; "Short Change Hero" was featured in the promo for the first season of Haven, the 2010 movie Faster, the trailer for the 2011 video game Batman: Arkham City, later opened the 2012 video game Borderlands 2, and the promo for Season 2 of Longmire. It is also the opening theme of the Sky1 television series Strike Back and was included in the 2011 racing video game Driver: San Francisco (along with two other songs from the band) as well as the Season 2 finale of Suits. The song "How You Like Me Now?" was featured at the beginning and end of the 2010 film The Fighter, in the Season 3 finale of Suits, in the trailer for the 2012 film Ted, during the closing credits for Horrible Bosses, the closing credits for Borderlands 2, and then again in a TV spot for the 2013 animated film, Turbo.

== Track listing ==
| No. | Title | Length |
|---|---|---|
| 1. | "The House That Dirt Built (Intro)" | 0:19 |
| 2. | "Oh No! Not You Again!!" | 1:54 |
| 3. | "How You Like Me Now?" | 3:38 |
| 4. | "Sixteen" | 3:02 |
| 5. | "Short Change Hero" | 5:22 |
| 6. | "No Time" | 4:31 |
| 7. | "Long Way from Home" | 3:19 |
| 8. | "Cause for Alarm" | 4:44 |
| 9. | "Love Like That" | 2:39 |
| 10. | "What You Want Me to Do?" | 3:23 |
| 11. | "Stuck" | 5:27 |
