= What Makes a Good Man? =

Single by The Heavy

from the album The Glorious Dead
- B-side: "In Your Hands" (Green 7"); "The Sleeping Ignoramus" (Orange 7")
- Released: 23 May 2012
- Genre: Alternative rock; indie rock; funk rock; neo soul
- Length: 3:48 (album version); 3:24 (radio edit)
- Label: Counter
- Songwriter: The Heavy
- Producer: Jim Abbiss

The Heavy singles chronology
"Short Change Hero" (2009)	"What Makes a Good Man?" (2012)	"Curse Me Good" (2012)

"What Makes a Good Man?" is a song by English rock band The Heavy. It was released as the lead single from their third studio album, The Glorious Dead, on 23 May 2012. A music video for the song was also released on Vevo and YouTube on 21 August 2012. The song peaked at number 127 on the French Singles Chart.

The song was used during the credits sequence in the video game Borderlands: The Pre-Sequel. and a Russian television commercial for the Volkswagen Teramont. Since March 2018 it is also the theme song for the German late night show Late Night Berlin. It was also used as the theme song for WWE's PPV event Royal Rumble in January 2013. In 2024, the song appears as the soundtrack to a pastoral spring scene at the end of Season 3, Episode 4 of Clarkson's Farm, as well as for the 2012 ice hockey video game NHL 13 by EA Sports. In 2013 the song was used for a short period during the Top Gear season 19 “Nile Special”. In 2021 the trio used it as part of their “Lochdown” special in Season 4 of the Grand Tour.

== Music video ==
The official music video for the song, lasting three minutes and twenty-one seconds, was uploaded on 21 August 2012 to the band's Vevo channel on YouTube.

== Track listing ==
=== 7" vinyls ===
- Counter — COUNT044 A/B (Green vinyl)

Side A
No.	Title	Length
1.	"What Makes a Good Man?"	3:48

Side B
No.	Title	Length
1.	"In Your Hands"	3:02

- Counter — COUNT044 C (Orange vinyl)

Side A
No.	Title	Length
1.	"What Makes a Good Man?"	3:48

Side B
No.	Title	Length
1.	"The Sleeping Ignoramus"	3:58

=== Promo CD ===
- Counter — COUNTCD044P

Side A
No.	Title	Length
1.	"What Makes a Good Man?" (Radio edit)	3:24
2.	"What Makes a Good Man?"	3:48
3.	"What Makes a Good Man?" (Radio edit instrumental)	3:22
4.	"What Makes a Good Man?"	3:46

== Charts ==
Chart (2012)	Peak position
France (SNEP)	127
US Alternative Airplay (Billboard)	31
