= Short Change Hero =

2009 single by the Heavy

Song by the Heavy

from the album The House That Dirt Built
- Released: 13 October 2009
- Recorded: 2009
- Studio: Toybox (Bristol, England); State of the Ark (Richmond, England)
- Genre: Blues rock; indie rock; trip hop; neo-soul
- Length: 5:22
- Label: Counter
- Songwriter: The Heavy
- Producer: Jim Abbiss

"Short Change Hero" is a song by English rock band The Heavy. It is the fifth track on their second studio album, The House That Dirt Built (2009). In 2012, the song peaked at number 109 on the French Singles Chart.

== Release ==
"Short Change Hero" was not released as a single and was first featured on the fifth song on the Heavy's second studio album, The House That Dirt Built (2009).

=== Use in other media ===
Short Change Hero has appeared in various films, television series, and video games. It was featured on the soundtrack of the 2010 film Faster.

The song was used in a promotional trailer for the 2011 video game Batman: Arkham City. It was also used as the main theme for the 2012 video game Borderlands 2 and later appeared in the Smoke and Thunder DLC for the VR game Pistol Whip.

In television, the song was featured in Suits (season 4, episode 7), during the end credits of the season three finale of The Umbrella Academy, and in Clarkson’s Farm season 3. It also served as the theme song for the Sky UK series Strike Back.

== Chart performance ==
Despite not being released as a single, the song entered the French Singles Chart at number 162 on the week of 7 July 2012 and moved up to 109, its peak on that chart, during the next week. It reentered the chart at number 165 on the week of 29 June 2013, but exited the chart after that week.

Chart (2012)	Peak position
France (SNEP)	109

== Certifications ==
Region	Certification	Certified units/sales
United Kingdom (BPI)	Silver	200,000^{‡}
^{‡} Sales+streaming figures based on certification alone.
