= Hurt & the Merciless =

Studio album by The Heavy
- Released: 1 April 2016
- Recorded: 2014–15 near Bath, England
- Genre: Indie rock; funk rock; blues rock; garage rock
- Length: 43:59
- Label: Counter; Bad Son
- Producer: The Heavy

The Heavy chronology
The Glorious Dead (2012)	Hurt & the Merciless (2016)	Sons (2019)

Singles from Hurt & The Merciless
- 1. "Since You Been Gone" Released: 4 February 2016; 2. "Turn Up" Released: 23 February 2016; 3. "What Happened to the Love?" Released: 31 March 2016

Professional ratings
Aggregate scores
Source	Rating
Metacritic	70/100
Review scores
Source	Rating
AllMusic	3.5/5 stars
Classic Rock	3.5/5 stars

Hurt & the Merciless is the fourth studio album by English rock band The Heavy, released on 1 April 2016 through Counter Records and the Bad Son Recording Company. The album's first track, "Since You Been Gone", was released as the album's lead single on 4 February 2016 alongside an accompanying music video. The tracks "Turn Up" and "What Happened to the Love?" were also released as singles.

== Release ==
Hurt & the Merciless was released on 1 April 2016 through Counter Records and the Bad Son Recording Company. It was released as a CD, a digital download, and a vinyl. A deluxe box set, limited to 1000 copies, were also released, containing both CD and vinyl copies of the album, a code containing an MP3 download of the album, badges and stickers, a poster, and two 7" vinyls, with one featuring the first two tracks on the album, "Since You Been Gone" and "What Happened to the Love?", and the other containing two bonus tracks titled "Panic Attack!" and "WTF?".

"Since You Been Gone" was released as the album's lead single on 4 February 2016, the same day the album was announced. A music video for the song was also released, directed by Focus Creeps and starring Thomas Turgoose and Abigail Hardingham. "Turn Up" was released as the album's second single on 23 February, with a lyric video being released for it, and "What Happened to the Love?" was released as the third single on 31 March, alongside a music video.

== Track listing ==
Hurt & the Merciless — CD – digital download – vinyl
No.	Title	Length
1.	"Since You Been Gone"	3:09
2.	"What Happened to the Love?"	3:15
3.	"Not the One"	3:52
4.	"The Apology"	3:16
5.	"Nobody's Hero"	3:57
6.	"Miss California"	4:35
7.	"Turn Up"	3:27
8.	"A Ghost You Can't Forget"	3:22
9.	"Last Confession"	4:37
10.	"Mean Ol' Man"	3:56
11.	"Slave to Your Love"	2:59
12.	"Goodbye Baby"	3:34
13.	"Panic Attack" (bonus track)	3:03
Total length:		43:59

== Personnel ==
Personnel adapted from album liner notes.

The Heavy

- Kelvin Swaby – vocals
- Dan Taylor – guitar
- Spencer Page – bass
- Chris Ellul – drums

Other personnel

- Bazza – mastering
- Bosco Mann – arrangement, brass, strings
- Toby McLaren – arrangement, brass, strings
- Andrew Scheps – mixing

== Charts ==
Chart (2016)	Peak position
Austrian Albums (Ö3 Austria)	73
Belgian Albums (Ultratop Flanders)	184
Belgian Albums (Ultratop Wallonia)	170
French Albums (SNEP)	132
Scottish Albums (OCC)	31
Swiss Albums (Schweizer Hitparade)	41
UK Albums (OCC)	36
UK Album Downloads (OCC)	19
UK Independent Albums (OCC)	10

== Release history ==
Region	Date	Format(s)	Label	Catalogue no.
Worldwide	1 April 2016	CD; digital download; vinyl	Counter; Bad Son	COUNT077 / BSON001
