= The Music Machine =

American rock band formed in 1966

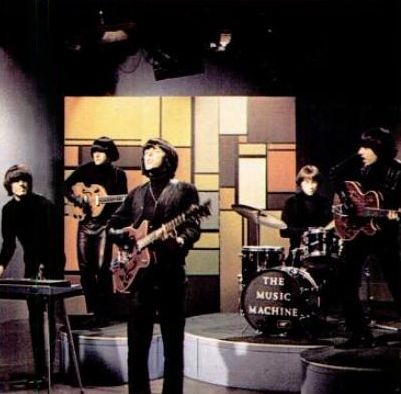
- The Music Machine in 1966

Background information
- Also known as: The Bonniwell Music Machine
- Origin: Los Angeles, California, United States
- Genres: Garage rock; psychedelic rock; acid rock; proto-punk
- Years active: 1965–1969
- Labels: Original Sound; Warner Bros.; Bell
- Past members: Sean Bonniwell (d. 2011); Ron Edgar (d. 2015); Mark Landon; Keith Olsen (d. 2020); Doug Rhodes
- Website: bonniwellmusicmachine.com

The Music Machine was an American rock band formed in Los Angeles, California, in 1966. Fronted by chief songwriter and lead vocalist Sean Bonniwell, the band cultivated a dark and rebellious image reflected in their musical approach. Sometimes the band made use of distorted guitar lines and hallucinogenic organ parts, punctuated by Bonniwell's distinctively throaty vocals.

Although they managed to attain national chart success only briefly with two singles, the Music Machine is today considered by many critics to be one of the groundbreaking acts of the 1960s. Their style is now recognized as a pioneering force in proto-punk; yet within a relatively short period of time, they began to employ more complex lyrical and instrumental arrangements that went beyond the typical garage band format.

In 1965, the band came together as a folk rock trio known as the Raggamuffins, before expanding to the quintet that was later rechristened the Music Machine. The group was known for their style of dress, clothing themselves in all-black attire. In 1966, the Music Machine was signed to Original Sound, and released its first single "Talk Talk" in the latter half of the year, with it reaching the Top 20 of the Billboard Hot 100. Their debut album (Turn On) The Music Machine and the moderate hit "The People in Me" followed. The band's original lineup fragmented in late 1967 after managerial and financial disputes. Bonniwell reassembled the group under the name The Bonniwell Music Machine. In 1968, a second album, The Bonniwell Music Machine, appeared but the group disbanded in early 1969.

== History ==
=== Beginnings (1965–1966) ===
The nucleus of the band was formed when Sean Bonniwell (lead vocals, rhythm guitar) took part in a jam session with Keith Olsen (bass guitar) and Ron Edgar (drums; born Ronald Edgar on June 25, in Minneapolis, Minnesota) – both of whom he met in the folk music circuit. Bonniwell, already a practiced "folky", possessed prior experience as a vocalist with the Wayfarers. The traditional folk combo had already enjoyed some regional success: releasing three albums, and building on the experience of Bonniwell who insisted on the importance of rehearsal. As Bonniwell traveled and recorded with the group, he began penning some material that would later surface with the Music Machine. However, still influenced by acts now considered passé, the Wayfarers' musical traditionalism became stifling to Bonniwell who wanted to explore the type of harder, cutting-edge stylistic possibilities that he eventually would find in rock. Olsen had previously performed in Gale Garnett's backing band, and Edgar was a member of a bohemian folk quintet called the GoldeBriars, which featured later Sunshine Pop progenitor Curt Boettcher (whose career would intertwine with various members of the Music Machine in the late 1960s). With the GoldeBriars, Edgar contributed to their third album, which was slated for release on Epic Records, but the group disbanded before the album was issued.

In 1965, the three formed their own folk rock group, the Raggamuffins, and began performing in Los Angeles with a repertoire that saw the band embrace a more unorthodox style, and depart from their traditional roots. The group also recorded four songs that went unreleased until the 2000 album, Ignition, which represented the transitional phase before the band developed into the Music Machine. Bonniwell and Olsen were enthusiastically experimenting with musical textures while the band arranged strict rehearsal regimens in Bonniwell's garage. The Raggamuffins purchased hardware for a homemade fuzz-tone switch. From the onset Bonniwell ensured the group resonated like no other by instructing his bandmates to lower their instruments from the standard E note to D-flat. As a result of the adjustment, the Raggamuffins were given a bottom-heavy and ominous sound. In addition, the group began dressing noire, while sporting dyed-black hair, and the trademark single leather glove that presented an eye-catching and unified band image, which would later become influential with certain 1970s punk acts.

Auditions were held in early 1966 to expand the group, resulting in the recruitment of Mark Landon (lead guitar) and Doug Rhodes (organ), the latter previously a session musician for the Association (whose first album was produced by Boettcher). To reflect on the revamped line-up, Bonniwell changed the band's name to the Music Machine. Another purpose for coining the name, Bonniwell explained, was "I seguewayed [sic] all the original material with musical segueways [sic]. So we would be on stage for like an hour and ten minutes, wall-to-wall music just nonstop, which is why I called us the Music Machine". The band established a solid reputation with its performances in Los Angeles clubs. With Bonniwell as the de facto leader and creative force of the band, the Music Machine began to develop a blend of gritty 60s punk and psychedelia, and a repertoire encompassing Bonniwell's self-penned material along with some cover songs. The band's sound was highlighted by the authoritative and versatile vocals provided by Bonniwell, with an energized technique and unusually good intonation in long-sustained passages, and the ability to breakdown phrases into a series of slow pulsations. The Music Machine's artistic stance was also highlighted by Landon's wiry guitar playing, Olsen's reverberant bass, and Edgar's cymbal-punctuated drumming, which gave the band a harder-edged sound than many of their contemporaries.

=== Commercial success (1966–1967) ===
Record producer Brian Ross just happened upon the Music Machine at Hollywood Legion Lanes, a bowling alley that was an early stomping ground for the group, and signed them to a recording contract with Original Sound. On July 30, 1966, the band entered RCA Studios in Los Angeles to record the Bonniwell originals "Talk Talk" and "Come on In", which was initially going to be the A-side for the group's debut single. Bonniwell had composed "Talk Talk" a year prior to forming the band, and the studio time was marked by the Music Machine's collective input aimed toward tightening the structure of its arrangements, including the two-note fuzz guitar riffs and Edgar's precise drumming technique. By virtue of the group's dedication to rehearsal, recording sessions concluded with the Music Machine requiring only three takes to complete the two songs. Though the band was satisfied with the acetate to "Come on In", the members were convinced "Talk Talk" would propel them into the national charts.

"Talk Talk" was released on September 10, 1966, on Original Sound, and rose to number 15 on the Billboard Hot 100. It also peaked at number 21 on Cashbox and number 18 on Record World. The song's relatively short time-length—a mere one minute and 56 seconds—made "Talk Talk" a favorable staple on Top 40 radio and its competing underground FM stations. The Music Machine's hit was arguably the most radical single to appear on mainstream broadcasting in 1966, the phenomenon described by music historian Richie Unterberger as a "rally cry to social alienation with a mixture of sarcasm, rebellion, self-pity, and paranoia". Indeed, Bonniwell's progressive lyrics and arrangements have been credited with influencing the Doors and Iron Butterfly, as well as future punk bands. After the single's release, the Music Machine embarked on a grueling three-month tour across the U.S., packaged with the Beach Boys, Question Mark and the Mysterians, and Clyde McPhatter. It concluded with the group receiving a poor response in the American south, where the band were criticized for their black outfits. Nonetheless, for the most part, their unified image served well for the Music Machine's national recognition, especially as the group made numerous appearances on the television programs Where the Action Is, American Bandstand, and Shindig!.

After their long national tour, the Music Machine returned to the studio to record their debut album, (Turn On) The Music Machine. Much to the disapproval of Bonniwell, his original material had to compete with cover versions of "Cherry, Cherry", "Taxman", "See See Rider", and "96 Tears", all chosen by their record label with an expectation that well-known songs would increase record sales. The band's slow, moody, fuzz-laden arrangement of the folk standard "Hey Joe" bears a strong resemblance to Jimi Hendrix's later version. Bonniwell first heard the song in 1962 at a club in Hermosa Beach. He felt the tune's tempo was too fast, and he unsuccessfully attempted to persuade the Wayfarers to record a slower version. He revisited the concept with altered lyrics after hearing Tim Rose's regionally successful rendition in early 1966. Bonniwell ascribes his throaty vocals, most evident on "Hey Joe", on recording "the Turn On album after a 30-day tour. Mark's fingers were literally bleeding. I could hardly even speak, much less sing". Despite the album's shortcomings, (Turn On) The Music Machine reached number 75 on the Billboard 200. On January 21, 1967, a song taken from the album, "The People in Me", was issued as the group's second single, but it stalled at number 66 nationally after the band's management angered radio executives for initially making the song exclusively available to a rival station.

=== The Bonniwell Music Machine (1967–1969) ===
Immediately after (Turn On) The Music Machine was released, the band was booked for another U.S. tour; the group sought an appearance at the Monterey Pop Festival, but it was not included on their itinerary. During off-periods in their hectic touring schedule, the Music Machine demoed a new batch of Bonniwell originals at RCA Studios in New York City and Cosimo Matassa's facility in New Orleans, before polishing the tunes in Los Angeles. From the sessions emerged the group's third single "Double Yellow Line", released in April 1967, and bubbled under the Billboard Hot 100 at number 111. The subsequent release, "Eagle Never Hunts the Fly" failed to chart, but was described as Bonniwell's tour de force—a tune Ross praised as a "sonically compelling work and a lot to listen to, for the time. It was the kind of thing you just didn’t hear, you almost worried about getting those sounds onto a 45".

In May 1967, the original lineup recorded together for the final time, completing "Astrologically Incompatible", "Talk Me Down", and "The Day Today". One problem that led to the band's first breakup was that as part of their production deal, the "Music Machine" name was owned by Ross, who paid the group little to no royalties. Leaving Bonniwell to carry on the project, Olsen, Edgar, and Rhodes joined the Millennium, a sunshine pop group conceived by Boettcher and Olsen. The Millennium recorded one album, Begin, in 1968 before disbanding. The three former Music Machine members also took part in Boettcher's next production, the studio group with Gary Usher called Sagittarius. The group released the album Present Tense, coupled with the moderately successful single "My World Fell Down", before Edgar and Rhodes departed. Olsen stayed on board to record Sagittarius' second album, The Blue Marble (on which Boettcher had minimal involvement), and subsequently forged a successful career as a record producer in the 1970s.

Undeterred, Bonniwell successfully negotiated his recording contract with Original Sound be transferred to Warner Bros. Records, in hopes of finding a greater degree of independence. The Music Machine's spell with Original Sound was drawing to a close, though the label did release "Hey Joe" as a single in 1968 in an attempt to cash in on Hendrix's success with the song. There was also the Bonniwell solo project in association with producer Paul Buff that resulted in the rare "Nothing Is Too Good for My Car" single being put out under the name the Friendly Torpedoes. Writer Greg Russo, who composed the liner notes for the single's remastered release, explains the side-project was initiated during a confusing transitional phase for Bonniwell that also generated the tune "Citizen Fear", which did not receive distribution until the Ignition album in 2000. Free from company pressure, Bonniwell formed a new band, rechristened The Bonniwell Music Machine, with session musicians Ed Jones on bass guitar, Harry Garfield on organ, Alan Wisdom on lead guitar, and Jerry Harris on drums.

In March 1967, Bonniwell and Ross ushered in the new lineup at United Western Recorders to record the second album The Bonniwell Music Machine. The recording and mixing process was painstakingly masterminded almost solely by Bonniwell, who was appreciative of his new bandmates' efforts to develop the album's concept, but disillusioned by the project's lack of cohesion. He further explains that the "Warner Brothers album has such an eclectic approach; each track is (was) a singular, studio invention. Not only was my songwriting divergent, but my approach to recording was exploratory as well". Six of the album's tracks were holdovers from the first lineup's sessions at Cosimo Matassa's studio and RCA Studios. This resulted in a hodgepodge of musical styles, including exploratory approaches toward psychedelia and soft rock. On February 10, 1968, The Bonniwell Music Machine was released with little commercial success. Consequently, the Bonniwell Music Machine was largely forgotten by the general public and the second lineup fragmented in July 1968.

=== Disbandment and aftermath ===
One final version of the Bonniwell Music Machine was assembled with a revolving door of musicians. Two more singles were released on the Warner Bros. label with little notice, before "Advice and Consent", the group's final single, was distributed on Bell Records in March 1969. Disenchanted by the music industry and having to tour against imitation Music Machine groups, Bonniwell gave up the rights to the band's name and signed on to Capitol Records as a solo artist. Under the name T.S. Bonniwell, he recorded the album Close, which saw a poetically inclined Bonniwell explore string and orchestral arrangements. Following the album's release, Bonniwell departed on what he called his "westernized guru era"—studying eastern mysticism and practicing meditation and vegetarianism.

The band was all but forgotten after their dissolution, but the Music Machine and their music experienced a revival of interest in the late-1980s. It began with Rhino Records featuring tracks on the Nuggets compilation albums Nuggets Volume 1: The Hits and Nuggets, Volume 2: Punk, before releasing the album The Best of the Music Machine in 1984. Other compilations such as Beyond the Garage, The Very Best of the Music Machine, and Ignition have added to the Music Machine's return to the public's interest. In addition, "Talk Talk" and "Double Yellow Line" appear on the 1998 expanded box-set of Nuggets: Original Artyfacts from the First Psychedelic Era, 1965–1968.

In 2000, Bonniwell published his autobiography Beyond the Garage, which recalled his experiences with the Music Machine and his life after the group's disbandment. A new version of the Bonniwell Music Machine in 2004 played to packed clubs on a European tour that included an appearance headlining one night of the Wild Weekend festival in Spain. Aside from this, a few live performances with the Larksmen, and a guest appearance on their 2006 album, Bonniwell never returned to an active music career, though he claimed to have penned over 300 songs after his tenure with the Music Machine. On December 20, 2011, Bonniwell died of lung cancer at a medical center in Visalia, California; he was 71 years old. Drummer Ronald "Ron" Edgar died on February 23, 2015, at the age of 68. Bass guitarist Keith Olsen died on March 9, 2020, at age 74.

== Discography ==
=== Studio albums ===
- (Turn On) The Music Machine (1966) US Billboard # 76
- The Bonniwell Music Machine (1968)

=== Extended plays ===
- Talk Talk (1967)

=== Compilation albums ===
- The Best of the Music Machine (1984)
- The Music Machine (1994)
- Beyond the Garage (1995)
- Rock 'n' Roll Hits (1997)
- Turn On: The Best of the Music Machine (1999)
- Ignition (2000)
- The Ultimate Turn On (2006)
- Rarities, Vol. 1: Last Singles & Demos (2014)
- Rarities, Vol. 2: Early Mixes & Rehearsals (2014)
- Re-Ignition (2015)

=== Singles ===
- "Talk Talk" b/w "Come on In" (1966) US Billboard # 15; Canada RPM # 4
- "The People in Me" b/w "Masculine Intuition" (1967) US Billboard # 66; Canada RPM # 62
- "Double Yellow Line" b/w "Absolutely Positively" (1967) US Billboard # 111
- "The Eagle Never Hunts the Fly" b/w "I've Loved You" (1967)
- "Hey Joe" b/w "Taxman" (1967)
- "Advise and Consent" b/w "Mother Nature, Father Earth" (1969)

==== As The Bonniwell Music Machine ====
- "Bottom of the Soul" b/w "Astrologically Incompatible" (1967)
- "Me, Myself and I" b/w "Soul Love" (1968)
- "Tin Can Beach" b/w "Time Out for a Daydream" (1968)
- "You'll Love Me Again" b/w "To the Light" (1968)
- "Point of No Return" b/w "King Mixer" (1997)

==== Other ====
- "Nothing's Too Good for My Car" b/w "So Long Ago" (1968, as the Friendly Torpedos)
