= The Glorious Dead (album) =

Studio album by The Heavy
- Released: 20 August 2012
- Genres: Indie rock; neo soul; blues rock
- Length: 39:17
- Label: Counter
- Producers: Paul Corkett; The Heavy

The Heavy chronology
How You Like Me Now? (2010)	The Glorious Dead (2012)	Hurt & the Merciless (2016)

Professional ratings
Aggregate scores
Source	Rating
Metacritic	74/100
Review scores
Source	Rating
AllMusic	4/5 stars
musicOMH	4/5 stars
The Skinny	2/5 stars

The Glorious Dead is the third studio album by English rock band The Heavy. It was released on 20 August 2012 and has been described as a "quirky take on rootsy soul-influenced music." It peaked at #191 on the Billboard 200.

== Critical reception ==
Consequence of Sound wrote that the album "incorporates guitar-driven hard rock, bringing the band closer to the mainstream, which happens to be full of blues nerds just like them."

== Track listing ==
No.	Title	Writer(s)	Length
1.	"Can't Play Dead"	Dan Taylor · Kelvin Swaby	4:23
2.	"Curse Me Good"	Taylor	4:59
3.	"What Makes a Good Man?"	Taylor · Swaby	3:48
4.	"The Big Bad Wolf"	Taylor · Swaby	3:24
5.	"Be Mine"	Taylor	4:16
6.	"Same Ol'"	Taylor · Swaby	4:03
7.	"Just My Luck"	Taylor · Swaby · Spencer Page · Chris Ellul	3:04
8.	"The Lonesome Road"	Taylor	4:01
9.	"Don't Say Nothing"	Taylor · Swaby · Page · Ellul	3:40
10.	"Blood Dirt Love Stop"	Taylor · Swaby	3:57

The Glorious Dead: Synch Edition (Disc 2)
No.	Title	Length
1.	"A Lesson Learned"	3:06
2.	"In Your Hands"	3:00
3.	"The Sleeping Ignoramus"	4:24
4.	"She Got To Go"	1:44
5.	"Can't Play Dead" (Instrumental)	4:19
6.	"Curse Me Good" (Instrumental)	4:57
7.	"What Makes A Good Man?" (Instrumental)	3:45
8.	"The Big Bad Wolf" (Instrumental)	3:21
9.	"Be Mine" (Instrumental)	4:15
10.	"Same Ol'" (Instrumental)	4:00
11.	"Just My Luck" (Instrumental)	3:00
12.	"The Lonesome Road" (Instrumental)	3:56
13.	"Don't Say Nothing" (Instrumental)	3:37
14.	"Blood Dirt Love Stop" (Instrumental)	3:56
15.	"Short Change Hero"	5:22
16.	"No Time"	4:31
17.	"Strong Enough"	2:52
18.	"What You Want Me To Do"	3:22
19.	"Big Bad Wolf"	2:38
20.	"How You Like Me Now?"	3:37

== Personnel ==
The Heavy

- Kelvin Swaby – vocals
- Dan Taylor – guitar
- Spencer Page – bass
- Chris Ellul – drums

Producing

- Paul Corkett - producing, mixing, recording
- The Heavy - producing, mixing, recording
- Gabriel Roth - additional recording
- Hal Ritson - additional recording
- Rob Dowell - additional recording
- Lloyd Buchanan - gospel scoring
