= Talk Talk (The Music Machine song) =

1966 single by the Music Machine

- Italian picture sleeve

Single by the Music Machine

from the album (Turn On) The Music Machine
- B-side: "Come on In"
- Released: November 1966
- Recorded: August 1966
- Studio: RCA, Los Angeles
- Genre: Garage rock; proto-punk; proto-metal
- Length: 1:56
- Label: Original Sound
- Songwriter: Sean Bonniwell
- Producer: Brian Ross

The Music Machine singles chronology
"Talk Talk" (1966)	"The People in Me" (1967)

"Talk Talk" is the debut single of American garage rock band the Music Machine. It was released in November 1966, and became the band's only Top 20 hit on the Billboard Hot 100. The song was included on their debut album, (Turn On) The Music Machine.

== Background ==
The Music Machine was practicing the song before any interest from record producers. Sean Bonniwell strived to perfect the sound he had been experimenting with in preparation for a record deal. The band regularly played at an American Legion bowling alley in Los Angeles. Bonniwell was originally involved in the folk rock scene, but he wanted to create a harder sound or as he stated "something completely unique". To create his designed sound, Bonniwell had the band tune their instruments from the typical E to C#, creating a heavy effect (a technique later used by heavy metal bands, e.g., Metallica). Bassist Keith Olsen utilized a fuzz box to produce the song's signature bassline, which was backed by Mark Landon's wiry guitar playing. This new way of playing caught the attention of record producer Brian Ross, who brought them into studios to record a single.

Recording in RCA Recording Studios took only three hours at the expense of US$150. The song took two takes and the planned A-side, "Come on In", in only one. "Come on In" was later replaced by "Talk Talk" when record producers deemed it suitable for an A-side release. The "Talk Talk" track clocked at one minute and 56 seconds, yet still compiled four distinctive rhythm changes. Engineer Paul Buff innovated the recording by using a ten-track recording machine when most recording artists only had a four-track. Keyboardist Doug Rhodes played the farfisa organ which had its sound sliced and separated numerous times. The Music Machine was soon signed to the Original Sound label to release the single. "Talk Talk" became a hit upon its release when it eventually charted at number 15 on the national charts, remaining on the charts for 12 weeks, and also reached top ten in several L.A. charts. A.M. Radio constantly played the song due to its short track length, giving it added exposure. While touring, the song became a favorite among the band's fans, so the composition was regularly extended. The track was subsequently released on December 31, 1966 as the opening to the group's debut album, (Turn On) The Music Machine.

== Releases ==
"Talk Talk" has been circulated through several albums, compilations, and reissues since its initial release.

=== Singles/EPs ===
- "Talk Talk" b/w "Come on In" – Original Sound, 1966
- "Talk Talk" / "The People in Me" / "Come on In" / "Wrong" EP – Disques Voque, 1966
- "Come on In" b/w "Talk Talk" – Alvorada International, 1967
- "Talk Talk" b/w "Hot Smoke and Sassafras" – Original Sound, 1985

=== Albums/compilations ===
- (Turn On) The Music Machine – Original Sound, 1966 (1st track)
- Best of the Music Machine – Rhino, 1984 (1st track)
- Beyond the Garage – Sundazed, 1995 (1st track)
- The Very Best of the Music Machine – Collectables, 1999 (1st track)
- The Ultimate Turn On – Big Beat, 2006 (1st track)

== Reception ==
Aside from the initial chart success of the song, "Talk Talk" is still praised as a garage rock classic. Richie Unterberger praised Bonniwell's composition for its experimentation and raw sound. Unterberger described the song as "the most radical single to be heard on Top 40 radio in late 1966. Against a succession of grinding two-note fuzz riffs and key changes that rose and rose until it hit the ceiling, Bonniwell sprewed and growled a rally cry to social alienation with a mixture of sarcasm, self-pity, and paranoia".

David Fricke of Rolling Stone was equally satisfied with the band's song. He declared the band "created a breathlessly compact garage rock: hog-snort guitar distortion, machine gun drumming and paranoid growling despair, shaved and hardened by geometric precision. And although he was in his mid-twenties, Bonniwell nailed in his lyrics the hapless rage of white high school males with similar rigor".

== Personnel ==
- Sean Bonniwell – lead vocals
- Mark Landon – lead guitar
- Keith Olsen – bass
- Ron Edgar – drums
- Doug Rhodes – keyboards

== Chart performance ==
Chart (1966)	Peak position
Canada RPM Top 100	4
US Billboard Hot 100	15

== Alice Cooper version ==
"Talk Talk"
- German picture sleeve

Single by Alice Cooper

from the album Flush the Fashion
- B-side: "Dance Yourself to Death"
- Released: September 1980
- Recorded: February-March 1980
- Studio: Cherokee (Hollywood)
- Genre: New wave; heavy metal
- Length: 2:08
- Label: Warner Records
- Songwriter: Sean Bonniwell
- Producer: Roy Thomas Baker

Alice Cooper singles chronology
"Clones (We're All)" (1980)	"Talk Talk" (1980)	"You Want It, You Got It" (1981)

"Talk Talk" was covered by American rock musician Alice Cooper on his fifth solo album Flush the Fashion. It was released as a single in 1980, but failed to chart. A "short, fast, punky new wave" song with garage rock influences, its been compared to the Vapors.

=== Reception ===
Classic Rock writer Peter Thomas Webb praised the cover as "a bristling nugget of an opener." Andy Herrin was less impressed and called it his least favorite song on the album.

Daily Record writer Jim Bohen described the song as "a ferocious version, with snarling vocals and slashing guitars."

=== Personnel ===
Credits are adapted from the Flush the Fashion liner notes.

- Alice Cooper – vocals
- Davey Johnstone – lead guitar
- Fred Mandel – keyboards, rhythm guitar, backing vocals
- Dennis Conway – drums
- John Cooker Lopresti – bass guitar
- Flo & Eddie – backing vocals
- Joe Pizzulo – backing vocals
- Keith Allison – backing vocals
- Ricky "Rat" Tierney – backing vocals

== See also ==
- List of 1960s one-hit wonders in the United States
