= Preston Epps =

American percussionist (1930–2019)

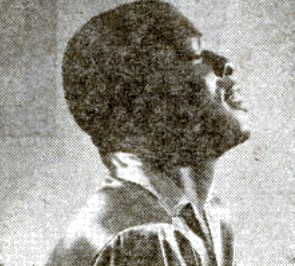
- Epps in 1959

Background information
- Born: July 19, 1930; Mangum, Oklahoma, US
- Died: May 9, 2019 (aged 88) Los Angeles, California, US
- Genres: Calypso, rock
- Instrument: Bongos
- Years active: 1950s–2014

Preston Eugene Epps (July 19, 1930 – May 9, 2019) was an American percussionist.

== Early life ==
Epps was born in Mangum, Oklahoma. He attended grade school in Tulsa and moved to Oakland as a teenager, where he attended junior high and high school. After leaving school, he served in the Air Force, and was stationed in Okinawa during the Korean War.

After his tour of duty he settled in Southern California, playing in coffee shops and working odd jobs. Epps was first interested with the drum kit in the early 1950s, when he visited Bop City, a San Francisco jazz club. He started as a percussionist but took to the bongos after he saw an African group and they gave him his first drum.

== Career ==
In 1954, Epps played bongos on The Penguins' single "Earth Angel", and its b-side, "Hey Señorita". He then played for Maya Angelou, which led him to tour with artists such as Ray Charles, Jackie Wilson, Little Richard, Johnny Otis, Sam Cooke, Jewel Akens, Robert “Bumps” Blackwell and Clifton “Fou Fou” Eddie.

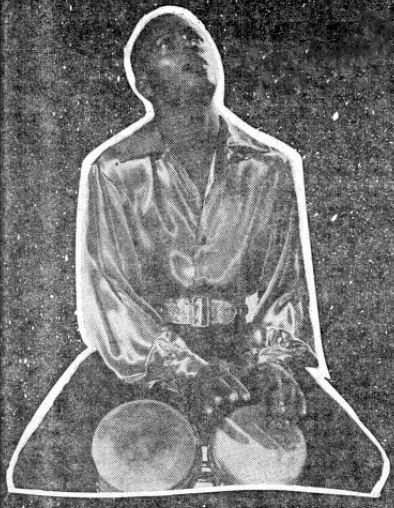
Epps in 1959.

Arthur Laboe, a local disc jockey, signed him to Original Sound Records, after hearing Epps play an exceptionally great bongo solo in a coffee house in Hollywood. According to Epps in a 2013 interview, Laboe said to him "you play pretty good, but you’re going to have to cut that 15-minute solo to a minute and a half." Epps thought he was "out of (his) mind", but was eventually executed in a recording studio at Sunset Sound and became his first single "Bongo Rock". The tune became a hit in the U.S., reaching #14 on the Billboard Hot 100 that year.

The follow-up, "Bongo Bongo Bongo", reached #78 the following year. Original Sound released a full-length LP in 1960, which reached #35 on the Billboard 200. However, further bongo-themed singles, including "Bongo in the Congo", "Bongo Rocket", "Bootlace Bongo", "Bongo Boogie", "Flamenco Bongo", "Mr. Bongo", and "Bongo Shuffle", did not result in any further success.

Epps reappeared in 1969 as a bongo player in the film Girl in Gold Boots. He continued on as a session musician in the 1960s and 1970s. In 1973, the Incredible Bongo Band recorded "Bongo Rock" and released it as a single.

Epps continued playing in clubs in Southern California into the 1990s. He retired in 2014, after playing his last gig at the Tiki Oasis in San Diego.

== Death ==
Epps had six children, fourteen grandchildren and twenty-four great-grandchildren. He died of natural causes in Los Angeles on May 9, 2019 at age 88.

== Discography w/Billboard and CHUM chart peak positions ==
=== Singles ===
- Bongo Rock (#14)/Bongo Party—Original Sound 4 -- 1959; (#4 CAN)
- Bongo Bongo Bongo (#78)/Hully Gully Bongo—Original Sound 9 -- 1960; (#11 CAN)
- Bongo Shuffle/Bongo In The Congo—Original Sound 14—1960
- Blue Bongo/Bongola—Top Rank 2067—1960
- Bongo Hop/Caravan—Top Rank 2091—1960
- Bongo Boogie/Flamenco Bongo—Majesty 1300—1960
- Bongo Rocket/Jungle Drums—Original Sound 17—1961
- Rockin' In The Congo/Sing Donna Go—Embassy 203—1961
- Mister Bongos/B'wana Bongos—Donna 1367—1962
- Bongo Express/Flamenco Bongo—Admiral 901—1963
- Bongo Rock '65/Bongo Waltz—Polo 218—1965
- Afro Mania/Love Is The Only Good Thing—Jo Jo 106—1969

=== Albums ===
- Calypso Trinidad ("Louis Polliemon and Lord Preston Epps")—Crown Records 5301— 1957
- Bongo Bongo Bongo (#35 US) -- Original Sound LPM-5002 (Mono)/LPS-8851 (Stereo) -- 1960

(All tracks from stereo copies are in stereo except Bongo Rock which is mono)

- Bongola—Top Rank RM-349 (Mono)/RS-349 (Stereo) -- 1961
- Surfin' Bongos—Original Sound LPM-5009/LPS-8872—1963
