= Art Laboe =

American radio host, producer, and songwriter (1925–2022)

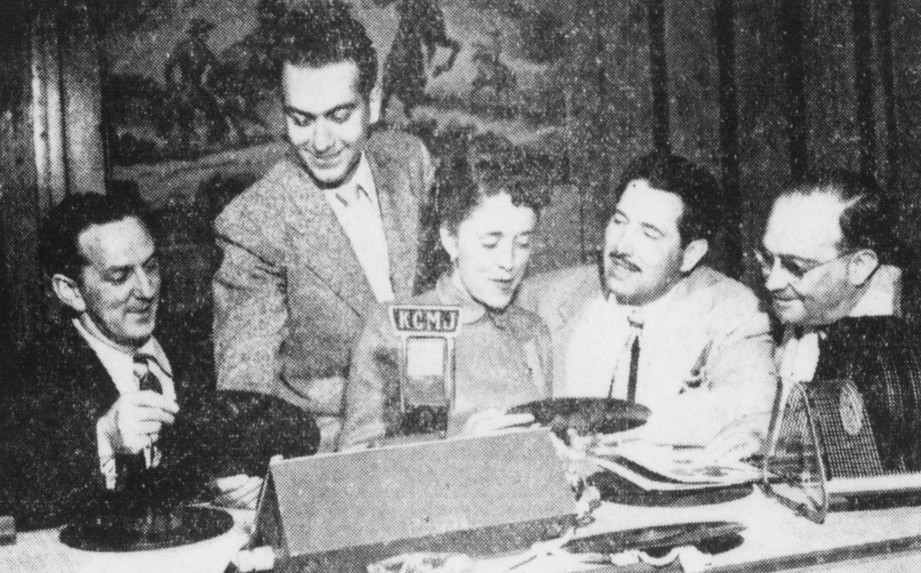
- Laboe (standing, second from left) with staff from KCMJ, 1948
- Born: Arthur Egnoian; August 7, 1925; Murray, Utah, U.S.
- Died: October 7, 2022 (aged 97); Palm Springs, California, U.S.
- Occupations: Disc jockey, songwriter, record producer, and radio station owner
- Years active: 1943–2022

Art Laboe (born Arthur Egnoian; August 7, 1925 – October 7, 2022) was an American radio host, songwriter, record producer, and radio station owner. He was generally credited with coining the term "Oldies but Goodies".

== Early life and education ==
Laboe was born to parents Hosanna (née Kezerian) and John Egnoian in Murray, Utah, a suburb of Salt Lake City, on August 7, 1925. His parents were Armenian immigrants and observant Mormons; his father, John, came to the United States from the Ottoman Empire.

When Laboe was 13, his parents divorced, whereupon he moved to South-Central Los Angeles to live with his sister. He attended George Washington High School and in 1938 began to experiment with amateur radio from his bedroom.

After graduating from high school, Laboe studied at Stanford University, then joined the United States Navy during World War II. He was stationed at Naval Station Treasure Island in San Francisco Bay.

== Career ==
Laboe made his professional radio debut in 1943 on KSAN in San Francisco, while stationed at Treasure Island. He obtained the job because he had a first-class radiotelephone license and the station had been depleted of staff in order to meet wartime demands. During this period he changed his last name to "Laboe," which had been derived from the station manager's secretary's name, because "it sounded catchier" and "more American." He was permitted to play big band and jazz records shortly before the station signed off at midnight, later encouraging his listeners to call the station to make song requests, an idea so ahead of its time that the technology did not yet exist to broadcast live telephone calls. Laboe had to repeat his callers' comments into the microphone.

Laboe returned to Southern California, obtaining work at KCMJ in Palm Springs. He acquired the nickname "As Long as He Lasts" because of a publicity stunt he participated in February 1948, wherein he hosted a "120-hour talkathon" for charity. He allowed himself only brief rests that lasted no more than 15 minutes.

He later returned to Los Angeles and began his time at KPOP. While working at KPOP, Laboe got the idea to take his show on the road and broadcast live from the local Scrivner's Drive-In, on Cahuenga and Sunset. Teenagers would come to the drive-in and hang out, and give live on-air dedications for songs. Laboe began to make a list of the most frequently requested songs. People would often call in who had just gone through a breakup and would ask him to play love songs to help win back their significant others. As the popularity grew, Laboe found a promoter and a ballroom east of Los Angeles, and through that the El Monte dance hall was formed.

With the live radio show going, he had the audience and the lists of requests. He began to turn that concept into an album titled Oldies But Goodies, a term he trademarked.

In 1959, Laboe formed record label Original Sound Records to promote new musical talent he discovered. In 1959 the label released two instrumental hit songs: "Teen Beat", the breakout hit by Sandy Nelson and "Bongo Rock" by Preston Epps. Laboe also received writing credit on both songs.

Later he moved to KXLA (subsequently KRLA), where he stayed for many years.

In the 1990s, Laboe worked for radio station KGGI.

In January 2006, Laboe debuted another syndicated request and dedication radio show, The Art Laboe Connection. The show began on weeknights on KDES-FM in Palm Springs and KOKO-FM in Fresno. It soon expanded to KHHT (Hot 92.3) in Los Angeles (until its 2015 format flip), KAJM (Mega 104.3) in Phoenix, and stations in Bakersfield and Santa Maria.

Laboe later DJ'd on two syndicated radio shows, both of which were broadcast across the American Southwest. The Art Laboe Connection and Art Laboe Sunday Special. In 2018, Art could be heard in 14 different radio markets including Los Angeles, the Inland Empire, San Diego, Las Vegas, and Phoenix.

== Social impact to Los Angeles ==
Laboe contributed to desegregating Los Angeles. As his on-air popularity started to grow, so did Laboe's ability to draw crowds of all ages. While hosting a local radio show, he approached the owner of Scrivner's Drive-In about being a sponsor. In return for buying ad spots, Laboe agreed to tell his audience he would meet them at the drive-in after the show. The success of the post-show meetup led Laboe to host a live remote from Scrivner's Drive-In on the corner of Sunset and Cahuenga in Los Angeles. According to Art, initially the audience was mostly white teenagers. The growing popularity of the live broadcast, coupled with growing police harassment of the teenagers who attended the shows, led Laboe to look for a new location to host dances. Laboe chose the El Monte Legion Stadium. Since it was outside the city limits of Los Angeles, Laboe was not subject to a city ordinance that mandated LA Board of Education approval for any public dance intended for high school students.

Laboe began hosting Saturday night dance shows at the El Monte Legion Stadium, a venue that, until then, had primarily hosted country jamborees and boxing matches. Those events began to attract teenagers of all races, but mostly Hispanic. In a city divided by topography, neighborhoods, and class, Laboe brought together teenagers of the greater Los Angeles area, regardless of race or class, to one location. He did not discriminate when listeners called to request a song live on-air and was one of the first DJs to allow people of different races to make a request.

== Death ==
Laboe died of pneumonia on October 7, 2022, at the age of 97. His final program was produced on October 6 and was later aired on October 9. He is buried at Inglewood Park Cemetery.
