= Sandy Nelson =

American drummer (1938–2022)

Background information
- Born: Sander Lloyd Nelson; December 1, 1938; Santa Monica, California, U.S.
- Died: February 14, 2022 (aged 83) Las Vegas, Nevada, U.S.
- Genres: Instrumental rock; surf; jazz
- Occupation: Musician
- Instrument: Drums
- Years active: 1959–2022
- Labels: Original Sound Records; Liberty Records; Imperial Records; Capitol Records

Sander Lloyd Nelson (December 1, 1938 – February 14, 2022) was an American drummer. Nelson, one of the best-known rock and modern jazz drummers of the late 1950s and early 1960s, had several solo instrumental Top 40 hits and released over 30 albums. He was a session drummer on many other well-known hits. He lived in Boulder City, Nevada, where he continued to experiment with music on keyboards and piano.

== Life and career ==
Sander Lloyd Nelson was born in Santa Monica, California to Lloyd and Lydia Nelson on December 1, 1938. Nelson attended University High School with Jan Berry and Dean Torrence, who later became recording stars as Jan and Dean, and Kim Fowley. In 1959, Fowley produced Nelson's first recording, "Geronimo" by the Renegades (a band made up of Nelson, Richard Podolor, Bruce Johnston, and songwriter Nick Venet). Although the single flopped on the national charts, it charted in some of the Mid West markets. The song featured in the 1959 film Ghost of Dragstrip Hollow released by American International Pictures.

After gaining respect as a session drummer, Nelson played on several hit singles including the Teddy Bears' "To Know Him Is To Love Him" (1958), The Hollywood Argyles' "Alley Oop" (1960) and Kathy Young and the Innocents' "A Thousand Stars" (1960).

His instrumental recording "Teen Beat", on Original Sound Records, rose to number 4 on the Billboard Hot 100 in 1959. It sold more than one million copies and was awarded a gold disc. Subsequently, he signed with the Imperial label and pounded out two more Top 40 hits, "Let There Be Drums", which went to number 7 on the Hot 100, and "Drums Are My Beat". In December 1961, the British music magazine NME, reported that "Let There Be Drums" had gone Top 10 in both the United Kingdom and United States. All three were instrumentals (a feat rarely repeated). Guitar on these hits was played by co-writer Richard Podolor, later a songwriter and record producer.

Near the end of 1963, Nelson was in a motorcycle accident. The injuries necessitated amputation of his right foot and part of that leg. Nonetheless, Nelson continued to record into the early 1970s, releasing two or three albums a year, consisting of cover versions of popular hits plus a few original compositions.

In September 2008, Nelson and a few friends, recording as Sandy Nelson and the Sin City Termites, released a new record of original compositions, Nelsonized, on the independent Spinout label. Other band members included Eddie Angel (guitarist for Los Straitjackets), Remi Gits, and Billy Favata of Torturing Elvis.

Nelson died in Las Vegas on February 14, 2022, at the age of 83 from complications of a stroke he had in 2017.

== Discography ==
(with Billboard (BB) and Cashbox (CB) peak positions)

=== Singles ===
- "Teen Beat" (BB No. 4, CB No. 4) / Big Jump—Original Sound 5 (1959)
- "Drum Party" / "Big Noise From Winnetka" — Imperial 5630 (1960)
- "Party Time" / "The Wiggle" — Imperial 5648 (1960)
- "Bouncy" / "Lost Dreams" — Imperial 5672 (1961)
- "Cool Operator" / "Jive Talk" — Imperial 5708 (1961)
- "Big Noise From The Jungle" / "Get With It" — Imperial 5745 (1961)
- "Let There Be Drums" (BB No. 7, CB No. 9) / "Quite A Beat" — Imperial 5775 (1961)
- "Drums Are My Beat" (BB No. 29, CB No. 57) / "The Birth Of The Beat" (BB No. 75) - Imperial 5809 (1962)
- "Drummin' Up A Storm" (BB No. 67) / "Drum Stomp" (No. 100) - Imperial 5829 (1962)
- "All Night Long" (BB No. 75) / "Rompin' & Stompin'" - Imperial 5860 (1962)
- "...And Then There Were Drums" (BB No. 65, CB No. 95) / "Live It Up" (BB No. 101) - Imperial 5870 (1962)
- "Teenage House Party" / "Day Train" — Imperial 5884 (1962)
- "Let The Four Winds Blow" (BB No. 107) / "Be Bop Baby" — Imperial 5904 (1962)
- "Ooh Poo Pah Doo" / "Feel So Good" — Imperial 5932 (1963)
- "You Name It" / "Alexes" — Imperial 5940 (1963)
- "Here We Go Again" / "Just Bull" — Imperial 5965 (1963)
- "Caravan" / "Sandy" — Imperial 5988 (1964)
- "Drum Shack" / "Kitty's Theme" — Imperial 66019 (1964)
- "Castle Rock" / "You Don't Say" — Imperial 66034 (1964)
- "Teen Beat" '65 (BB No. 44, CB No. 37) / "Kitty's Theme" — Imperial 66060 (1964)
- "Reach For A Star" (BB No. 133) / "Chop Chop" — Imperial 66093 (1965)
- "Let There Be Drums '66" (BB No. 120) / "Land Of 1000 Dances" — Imperial 66107 (1965)
- "Drums A Go Go" (BB No. 124) / "Casbah" — Imperial 66127 (1965)
- "A Lover's Concerto" / "Treat Her Right" — Imperial 66146 (1965)
- "Sock It To 'Em, J.B." / "The Charge" — Imperial 66193 (1966)
- "Pipeline" / "Let's Go Trippin'" - Imperial 66209 (1966)
- "The Drums Go On" / "Lawdy Miss Clawdy" — Imperial 66246 (1966)
- "Peter Gunn" / "You Got The Hummin'" - Imperial 66253 (1966)
- "Rebirth Of The Beat" / "The Lion In Winter" — Imperial 66350 (1969)
- "Manhattan Spiritual" (BB No. 119) / "The Stripper" — Imperial 66375 (1969)
- "Let There Be Drums And Brass" / "Leap Frog" — Imperial 66402 (1969)
- "Sapporo '72" / (B-side unknown) - United Artists 50830 (1972, unreleased)
- "Dance With The Devil" / "Sunshine Of My Life" — United Artists 383 (1974)
- "Drum Tunnel" / "Boogie No. 5" — Veebletronics 1 (1984)
- "Hunk Of Drums" / "Witch Hunt" — Veebletronics 2 (1984)
- "A Drum Is A Woman" / "Boogie No. 5" — Veebletronics 3 (1984)

=== Albums ===
NOTE: There were separate Cashbox charts for stereo and mono albums until 1965

- Sandy Nelson Plays Teen Beat - Imperial 9105 (Mono)/12044 (Stereo) (1960)

Originally issued with white cover, later issued with red cover. Features re-recorded version of "Teen Beat"

- He's a Drummer Boy (Later retitled Happy Drums) - Imperial 9136/12089 (1961)
- Let There Be Drums (BB No. 6) - Imperial 9159 (CB No. 7)/12080 (CB No. 17) (1962)
- Drums Are My Beat (BB No. 29) - Imperial 9168 (CB No. 24)/12083 (CB No. 31) (1962)
- Drummin' Up a Storm (BB No. 55) - Imperial 9187 (CB No. 82)/12189 (1962)
- Golden Hits (BB No. 106) - Imperial 9202/12202 (1962)
- Country Style- Imperial 9203/12203 (1962)

Reissued in 1966 as On The Wild Side

- Compelling Percussion - Imperial 9204/12204 (1962)

Reissued in 1966 as ...And Then There Were Drums

- Teenage House Party - Imperial 9215/12215 (1963)

Reissued in 1966 with different cover

- The Best of the Beats - Imperial 9224/12224 (1963)

Reissued in 1966 with different cover

- Beat That Drum - Imperial 9237/12237 (1963)
- Sandy Nelson Plays - Imperial 9249/12249 (1963)
- Be True to Your School - Imperial 9258/12258 (1964)
- Live! In Las Vegas (BB No. 122) - Imperial 9272 (CB No. 58)/12272 (1964)

Despite the title, all tracks are studio recordings with live audience dubbed in

- Teen Beat '65 (BB No. 135) - Imperial 9278/12278 (1965)
- Drum Discothèque (BB No. 120) - Imperial 9283/12283 (1965)
- Drums a Go-Go (BB No. 118, CB No. 82) - Imperial 9287/12287 (1965)
- Boss Beat (BB No. 126) - Imperial 9298/12298 (1966)
- "In" Beat (BB No. 148) - Imperial 9305/12305 (1966)
- Super Drums - Imperial 9314/12314 (1966)
- Beat That #!!@* Drum (CB No. 94) - Imperial 9329/12329 (1966)
- Cheetah Beat - Imperial 9340/12340 (1967)
- The Beat Goes On - Imperial 9345/12345 (1967)
- Soul Drums - Imperial 9362/12362 (1967)
- Teen Drums - Sunset SUS-5166/SUM-1166 (1967)
- Boogaloo Beat - Imperial 9367/12367 (1968)
- Rock and Roll Revival - Imperial 12400 (1968)
- Rebirth of the Beat - Imperial 12424 (1969)
- Manhattan Spiritual - Imperial 12439 (1969)
- Groovy - Imperial 12451 (1970)
- Disco Dynamite - United Artists L35491 (1975)

=== Budget compilations ===
- Walkin' Beat! - Sunset SUM-1114 (Mono)/SUS-5114 (Stereo) (1966)
- Teen Drums - Sunset SUM-1166/SUS-5166 (1967)
- And There Were Drums (Drums And More Drums) - Sunset SUS-5224 (1968)
- Heavy Drums - Sunset SUS-5261 (1969)
- Sandy Nelson Plays Fats Domino Hits - Sunset SUS-5291 (1970)
- Drums, Drums, Drums - Sunset SLS 50060 (Stereo) (1972)

== Bibliography ==
- Joel Whitburn, Top 40 Hits, ISBN 0-8230-8280-6
- Marc Ribowsky, He's A Rebel, 1989, Penguin Books, ISBN 978-0792484028
