= Doug Rhodes =

- Born: May 28, 1945 (age 79)
- Origin: California, United States
- Occupation(s): band member, session musician
- Instrument(s): keyboards saxophones bass guitar
- Years active: 1960s–present

Doug Rhodes (born May 28, 1945) is an American multi-instrumentalist who performed with 1960s rock bands the Music Machine and the Millennium.

Growing up in Garden Grove, California, Rhodes began his music career as a jazz saxophonist at the age of 16, playing with older brother Robbie Rhodes. Eventually, he became the member of a band called The Spats, for whom he played organ. He was kicked out of the band late in 1965. After moving to L.A. in January 1966, Rhodes met producer Curt Boettcher, who got him work as a studio musician. He played celeste for the Association's No. 1 hit "Cherish".

In the summer of 1966, Rhodes joined the rock band the Music Machine, for whom he primarily played the organ and provided backing vocals. After the release of the band's first LP, (Turn On) The Music Machine, and a promotional tour, four of the five members, including Rhodes, quit the group, leaving only singer/songwriter Sean Bonniwell. According to Rhodes, there was conflict over money and Bonniwell's attitude toward the other members. Bonniwell continued to use the band name and released a second album mostly of older recordings on which Rhodes had performed.

Rhodes continued to work with Curt Boettcher, forming the band the Millennium along with two other former Music Machine members. The Millennium's debut LP was released by Columbia Records in 1968. After the short-lived Millennium dissolved, Rhodes kept busy as a session musician, playing for the likes of the Association, Taj Mahal, Chad and Jeremy, Tommy Roe, and Van Dyke Parks. He was also involved in the Millennium-splintered group Bigshot, which was signed to Together records, the label set-up by Gary Usher and Boettcher in 1969. The others members of Bigshot included drummer Ron Edgar, guitarist Michael Fennelly, and ex-Goldebriars guitarist Murray Planta. Some demos were recorded but never issued. The producer of those sessions was Joey Stec.

In 1971, Rhodes moved to British Columbia, Canada. He continued to play around with various musicians, including Valdy. Eventually, he settled in Victoria, B.C., became a professional at piano tuning and restoration, as well as playing 1920s style jazz with an orchestra called The Belevedere Broadcasters. He has a son, Davis Lamar Rhodes, and a daughter, Sasha Marie Rhodes. As of 2015 he plays with the Yiddish Columbia State Orchestra, a Klezmer band, led by Marion Siegel.
