= Sean Bonniwell =

American singer-songwriter (1940–2011)

Background information
- Also known as: T.S. Bonniwell
- Born: Thomas Harvey Bonniwell; August 16, 1940; San Jose, California, United States
- Died: December 20, 2011 (aged 71) Visalia, California, United States
- Years active: 1960s–2011
- Formerly of: The Wayfarers; The Ragamuffins; The Music Machine
- Website: bonniwellmusicmachine.com

Thomas Harvey "Sean" Bonniwell (August 16, 1940 – December 20, 2011) was an American singer-songwriter/guitarist, who was known as the creative force behind the 1960s garage blues and blues rock band, The Music Machine.

Bonniwell was quoted in Richie Unterberger's 1998 book, Unknown Legends of Rock 'n' Roll, as saying "Rock and roll was a teenager in the '60s, and I used that climate to express my confusion, my anger, at the injustice of the world."

== Life and career ==
=== Early years to 1970s ===
Bonniwell was born in San Jose, California. During his teens, Bonniwell was inspired to form a high school vocal group after hearing the song "Only You" by The Platters. After high school, Bonniwell's first serious musical incarnation was that of clean-cut pop-folk guitarist for the quartet The Wayfarers. The Wayfarers released three albums under the RCA label.

As the folk music craze died out, Bonniwell sought to create music with "fuzz and fangs". In 1965, he formed a trio called The Ragamuffins, which quickly grew into The Music Machine. Adopting Beatles-style moptop hair and all-black outfits (and Bonniwell's signature single black leather glove), Music Machine churned out a diversified style of garage rock. After the band's debut album spawned the successful single "Talk Talk" (1966), the original line-up broke apart. Bonniwell continued on with Music Machine, now signed to Warner Bros. Records and renamed The Bonniwell Music Machine (1967). Unhappy with the way things were going, Bonniwell sold the rights to the band name to his label to be released from their contract.

In 1969, along with Mosaic Tweed and a duo consisting of Brad Truitt and Billy Woodruff, he was signed to the talent roster of Kevin Deverich and Associates run by Kevin Deverich. Also that year, Bonniwell released a solo album (Close) on Capitol Records. This recording marked a change in identity for Bonniwell, who not only chose to make gentle, sensitive music (contrasting that for which he was known), but also chose to record under the name of T.S. Bonniwell. The recording received minor label support and displeased Bonniwell enough that he left the music industry altogether. He entered a period of spiritual quest and internal soul-searching, grew a beard, sold everything he owned, and drove around the US in a Volkswagen bus. During this time he also briefly moved into soundtrack work and oversaw the scores to a handful of cult B movies, among them Night of the Witches (1970) and The Day of the Wolves (1971), both of which were re-released in 2024 by Real Gone Music.

=== 1990s to 2000s ===
In 1996, Bonniwell self-published a memoir called Talk Talk, which was later revised and re-titled Beyond The Garage, published by the independent publisher Christian Vision. Several years later, Sundazed Music put out previously unreleased Music Machine material from the 1960s, along with demo recordings from The Ragamuffins. Bonniwell claimed to have written over 300 songs since 1970.

In November 2004, Bonniwell embarked on his first European Tour, performing his hits with musicians from the US and Europe.

In 2006, Bonniwell recorded his first new material in several years, as a guest musician appearing on a self-titled debut album by The Larksmen, a garage rock group from Los Angeles, California. He appeared on two songs entitled "Burn Like A Boy" (actually written back in 1967 for The Music Machine but never released) and "Out Of Darwin's Mind".

== Death ==
Bonniwell died on December 20, 2011, in Visalia, California, from lung cancer. He was 71 years old.

== Discography ==
=== Singles ===
- "Bottom of the Soul" / "Astrologically Incompatible" (November 1967)
- "Me-Myself, And I" / "Soul Love" (January 1968)
- "In My Neighborhood" / "You'll Love Me Again" (April 1968)
- "To the Light" / "You'll Love Me Again" (May 1968)
- "Time Out (For a Daydream)" / "Tin Can Beach" (September 1968)
- "Advise and Consent" / "Mother Nature, Father Earth" (March 1969)
- "Where Am I to Go" / "Sleep" (June 1969) (as T.S. Bonniwell)

=== Albums ===
- The Bonniwell Music Machine WS 1732 / W 1732 (January 1968)
- Close (as T.S. Bonniwell) Capitol LP ST-277 (August 1969)

(Turn On) The Music Machine(album) by The Music Machine Original Sound label (1966)
