= The Heavy (band) =

English rock band

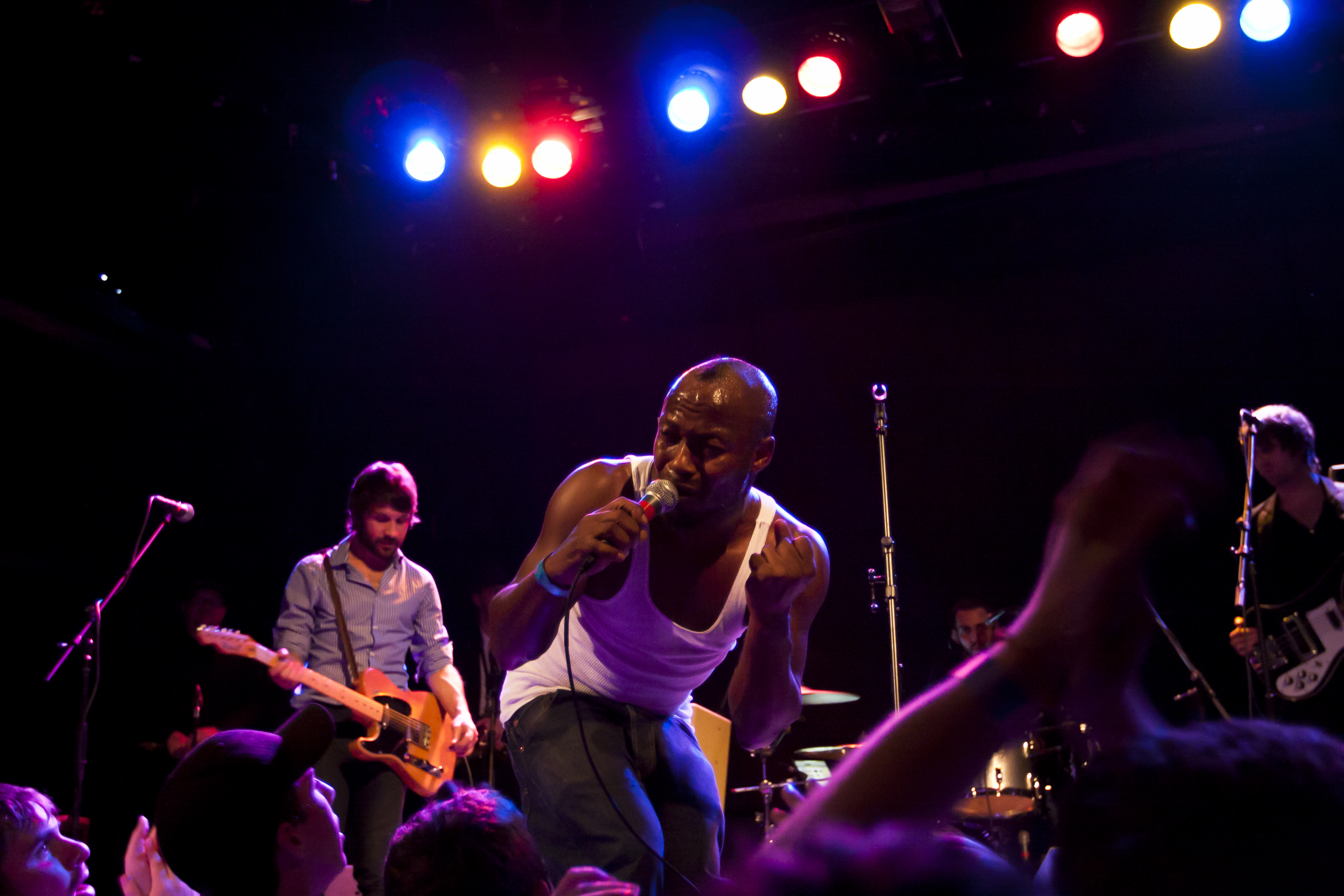
- The Heavy playing at Bowery Ballroom in New York City in 2010

Background information
- Origin: Bath, Somerset, England
- Genres: Indie rock; alternative rock; funk rock; garage rock revival; blues rock
- Years active: 2007–present
- Labels: Bad Son; Counter; BMG
- Members: Kelvin Swaby; Daniel Taylor; Spencer Page; Chris Ellul
- Website: theheavy.co.uk

The Heavy is an English rock band from Bath, Somerset, England, formed in 2007. They have released six albums as well as a wide array of singles. Their music has been widely used in the media, with their 2009 single "How You Like Me Now?" becoming their biggest hit.

== History ==
Formed in 2007, the band included five members: Kelvin Swaby (lead vocals), Dan Taylor (guitar), Spencer Page (bass guitar), Chris Ellul (drums) and Amanda McWhirter (backing vocals). Swaby and Taylor became friends in 1998 when they bonded over vintage R&B music and Jim Jarmusch films and soon formed the band.

The Heavy released two singles in the last half of 2007. Their first single was "That Kind of Man", which was released by Don't Touch Recordings and was mixed by Corin Dingley. Dingley was the original drummer and co-producer of the first album before being discovered by Ninja Tune, who promptly signed Swaby, Taylor, and Dingley. The Heavy released their first album, Great Vengeance and Furious Fire, on 17 September 2007 in the United Kingdom, and on 8 April 2008 in the United States.

On 26 March 2008, the Heavy were named ’artist of the day’ in Spin. The band was also mentioned in the Rolling Stone Hot List May 2008. They played at the 2008 South By Southwest (SXSW) music festival on the 89.3 Current Stage and collected one of the Best Discovery awards in Spin Magazine's "Best and Worst of SXSW 2008".

The Heavy appeared on the 2009 album Johnny Cash Remixed with a version of "Doing My Time". On 2 October 2009 their second album The House That Dirt Built was released by Counter Records. The band's third album The Glorious Dead was released on 21 August 2012 via a partnership between Counter Records and Ninja Tune. The band undertook an extensive tour of the United States from August to September 2012, with sponsorship from the American beer company Miller Lite. The band also had a string of European dates to support The Glorious Dead, from October to November 2012. On 1 April 2016, The Heavy released their fourth album, Hurt & the Merciless.

The Heavy toured Europe and the United States in 2016, making stops at major festivals including Coachella Valley Music and Arts Festival, South by Southwest, Free Press Summer Fest, INmusic festival, Fuji Rock Festival, Hurricane Festival, and Southside Festival.

== Musical style and influences ==
AllMusic described the Heavy's sound as a "potent fusion of funk, soul, hip-hop, and gritty rock" and an "amalgam of soul, funk, R&B, and garage rock".

== In media ==
"How You Like Me Now?" could be heard being played over the speakers at the McCormick Place Convention Center in Chicago, Illinois, the 2012 election night location for U.S. President Barack Obama, just after the projected results for Ohio were announced. The Electoral College votes from Ohio clinched the 2012 Presidential re-election for him. The band played the song on the Late Show with David Letterman on 18 January 2010. This was the first time that Letterman had ever asked a musical artist to perform an encore on his show. On 9 June 2010, "How You Like Me Now?" was featured in the opening montage of Hockey Night in Canada's broadcast of game six of the Stanley Cup Final. "How You Like Me Now?" also featured in the 2014 video game Forza Horizon 2, and in the ending credits of the 2013 videogame Knack. "That Kind of Man" from the band's first album was featured in "Filthy Lucre", an episode of the series Californication. "How You Like Me Now?" with B-side "The Big Bad Wolf", and "The Sleeping Ignoramus" from third album were featured in the 2011 video game Driver: San Francisco.

"That Kind Of Man" was used in the trailer for Parker and "Coleen" also in FIFA 09 both from the band's first album, was featured in "Play the Man", an episode of the USA network television show Suits. The show also used "What Makes a Good Man?" for the season 2 promo, "Can't Play Dead" in the episode "Zane vs. Zane" and "Short Change Hero" in the episode "War."

"Short Change Hero", from the Heavy's second album, has been used in the film Faster; the television shows The Outlaws, The Vampire Diaries, The Listener, Suits, The Umbrella Academy, Brassic and Killjoys; during the opening level of the campaign "Smoke and Thunder' in the virtual reality rhythm shooter game Pistol Whip; the ITV documentary Best of Enemies; the trailer for Batman: Arkham City; and in the promos for the first season of Haven and second season of Longmire. The song was used as the theme song of Strike Back from the second season onwards.

The band's music has been frequently used in the video game series Borderlands: Borderlands 2 featured "Short Change Hero" in the opening scene and "How You Like Me Now?" in the end credits; an instrumental jazz version of "Short Change Hero" later appeared in Poker Night 2, which featured characters from Borderlands; "What Makes A Good Man?" was used in the credits of the third game, Borderlands: The Pre-Sequel; and the band recorded "Put It On The Line" to use as the theme song for Borderlands 3.

"What Makes A Good Man?", from their third album, was used for the trailers for the video game Sleeping Dogs and the film Dallas Buyers Club; as the official theme song for the 2013 Royal Rumble pay-per-view event; in an episode of The Grand Tour titled "Lochdown"; in the 2013 film Grudge Match and the video game NHL 13; in H&M commercials featuring David Beckham; and in Guinness' "Sapeurs" commercial, a production in collaboration with the advertisement agency AMV BBDO. The band made their second appearance on The Late Show with David Letterman on 28 August 2012 performing the song, gaining their second encore on the show.

The band was asked to record a cover of the song "And When I Die" for the fourth season finale of True Blood. It also appeared on the third True Blood soundtrack.

"Who Needs The Sunshine?" was featured in the penultimate episode of the fourth series of Being Human, "Making History". The song was featured in a promo for the Cinemax series Hunted.

"Big Bad Wolf" was used in the 2010 film The Losers; the episode "Brotherfae of the Wolves" of the Canadian series Lost Girl; throughout the third episode of the CBS series Battle Creek; the fourth episode of series 21 of Top Gear; in the credits sequences to the first episode of series two of the British crime-drama Luther and the eighth episode of The Sandman; and is often used in Blue Angels performances.

The song "Same 'Ol'" was used for the launch trailer for the game Splinter Cell: Blacklist, while a variation was used in the trailer for Quentin Tarantino's film The Hateful Eight. The song was also used in a montage during the first episode of The Grand Tour. It was the soundtrack for the Pepsi commercial series featuring Shun Oguri as the Japanese folklore hero Momotarō.

The song "Don't Say Nothing" was used in the trailer for Kingsman: The Secret Service, in Gameloft's 2013 video game Gangstar Vegas, and appeared on the soundtrack for FIFA 13.

On 23 February 2016, The Heavy were the musical guest on the Canal+ programme Le Petit Journal where they performed their single, "Turn Up" from their album Hurt & the Merciless. In addition, the song is featured on the video game soundtrack of EA Sports' Madden NFL 17.

The song "Better As One" was used in the 2019 film Fast & Furious Presents: Hobbs & Shaw.

== Discography ==
- Great Vengeance and Furious Fire (2007)
- The House That Dirt Built (2009)
- The Glorious Dead (2012)
- Hurt & the Merciless (2016)
- Sons (2019)
- Amen (2023)
