= Original Sound =

American record label

- Founded: 1950s
- Founder: KPOP deejay Art Laboe
- Country of origin: United States

Original Sound is a Los Angeles, California-based record label. It was founded in the early 1950s by KPOP deejay Art Laboe. It began as a small label that specialized in compiling and re-releasing "oldies" R&B and rock 'n' roll songs.

== History ==
The label pioneered the concept of reissuing older pop and rock hits, and sold millions of records on his Oldies But Goodies compilation albums, several of which made the national Billboard album charts. All 15 volumes of this series were later reissued on a best-selling CD series in the 1980s and 1990s, although track listings on each CD volume varied widely from the original LP issues with identical numbers, and some volumes contained none of the same songs as their original issues. Later on, the Double Shot Records catalog was purchased by Original Sound in ca. 1972.

The label's biggest self-recorded hit as a single was "Teen Beat" by drummer Sandy Nelson, reaching number four on Billboard in 1959. Other successful Original Sound artists included:

- Preston Epps ("Bongo Rock" and "Bongo, Bongo, Bongo")
- The Music Machine ("Talk Talk" and "The People In Me")
- Dyke & the Blazers ("Funky Broadway")
- Bobby Mac ("Walkin' Together" b/w "Keep On", OS-68)

The first few "Oldies But Goodies" LPs were hugely successful (Volume 1 reached #12 on the Billboard Album charts and stayed on the chart for 183 weeks). Their success influenced other labels to put out compilations of their hits and near-hits, as well as helped validate the standing of songs like The Five Satins' "In the Still of the Night", which only reached #24 on the pop charts in 1956.

== Original Sound Recording Studios ==
In 1959 Laboe opened Original Sound Studios at 7120 West Sunset Boulevard in Los Angeles. Many prominent recording artists worked at the studio well into the 1980s, recording for Original Sound and other labels. In 1963, Paul Buff, who previously operated Pal Recording Studio became one of the principal recording engineers at Original Sound. Buff was responsible for many innovations added to the studio, including a unique custom built 10 track recording machine. Producer Frank Slay also recorded hit records at the studio.

== List of artists who recorded at Original Sound Studios ==
- Captain Beefheart
- The Music Machine
- Ramones - End of the Century
- Strawberry Alarm Clock - Incense and Peppermints
- Sugarloaf - Green-Eyed Lady
- Frank Zappa

== See also ==
- List of record labels
- Doo wop
- Rockabilly
