= Begin (The Millennium album) =

Studio album by the Millennium
- Released: August 1968
- Recorded: March–August 1968
- Genre: Sunshine pop; psychedelic pop; soft rock
- Length: 41:09
- Label: Columbia
- Producer: Curt Boettcher; Keith Olsen

The Millennium chronology
Begin (1968)	Magic Time (2001)

Singles from Begin
- 1. "It's You" Released: June 1968

Begin is the sole studio album released by the American music group the Millennium released in August 1968 on Columbia Records. The group first appeared after members from various Los Angeles pop groups such as the Ballroom, Sagittarius and the Music Machine decided to collaborate on an album.

Begin was the second album to use sixteen-track recording technology following Simon & Garfunkel's album Bookends. The group wrote songs in a style later described as sunshine pop, a style noted for its influence of psychedelia with rich harmony vocals and lush orchestrations. Due to the album's complex recordings and long studio time, it became the most expensive studio album recorded by 1968.

The album received critical acclaim on its release, but did not sell well, failing to chart in the United States and the United Kingdom. The group abandoned a follow-up album for which they had already recorded songs. As pop music of the 1960s was re-evaluated by newer generation of critics, Begin continued to receive positive reviews after the album was re-issued in the 1990s, with AllMusic finding it to be a "bona fide lost classic" and that it was on the same level as "more widely popular albums from the era", and Pitchfork declaring it "probably the single greatest 60s pop record produced in L.A. outside of the Beach Boys."

== Production ==
Following the release of Eternity's Children's debut album, Curt Boettcher and Keith Olsen began a new project that included members of the Ballroom and Sagittarius called the Millennium. Sandy Salisbury would later explain that "After the Ballroom disbanded, I got discouraged. I left music for a spell. But not writing. I got myself a sound-on-sound recorder and made my own demos. I recorded these late into the night in my rented North Hollywood house." before he was invited to record as part of the group with Boettcher. Unlike Sagittarius, the Millennium was described as "the original vision" of Boettcher. Mike Fennelly of the group stated that a "We were very enthusiastic about the creativity that was indeed at a high level for the initial writing, demo and master recording."

The recording was completed between March and August 1968. (Note: David Howard writes that the album was finished by July 1968 and was issued that month, but the liner notes to the 2008 CD reissue indicate that two tracks were recorded in August.) Certain songs on the album, including "5 AM", "I Just Want to Be Your Friend", "The Island", "Some Sunny Day" and "Karmic Dream Sequence no. 1" were actually recorded by Boettcher's previous group the Ballroom. Columbia acquired the rights to these songs from Steve Clark as part of its buy-out of Curt's Our Productions contract. Guitarist and songwriter Joey Stec stated that Columbia "put them on the record. But I don't really believe we had to. That was just because we had no management." On the album's completion, Columbia invested $100,000 into the recording, making it the most expensive record made by 1968. Much of the budget was due to Boettcher's method of preparing the record during the studio hours.

== Music ==
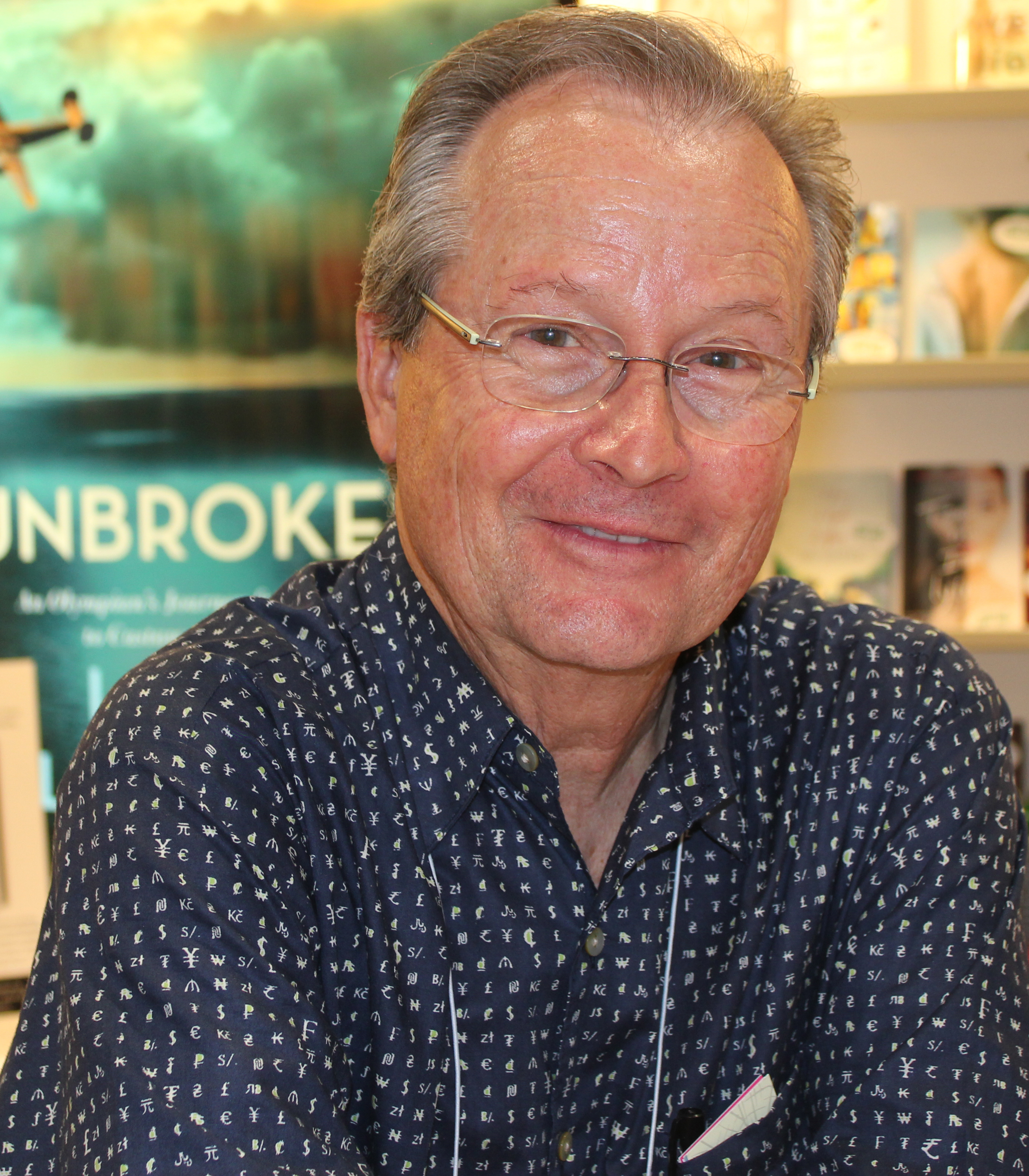
Salisbury contributed to the song "5 A.M." on Begin

David Howard in his book Sonic Alchemy: Visionary Music Producers and Their Maverick Recordings, described the music on Begin as belonging to the "belatedly-dubbed genre" sunshine pop, noting that it was "perhaps the clearest distillation" of the genre. AllMusic described the genre as a form mid-1960s mainstream pop music that was mildly influenced by psychedelia and combined "rich harmony vocals, lush orchestrations, and relentless good cheer."

Some of the lyrics and themes on Begin reflect the current world events and personal experiences happening to the members of the group. "To Claudia on Thursday" was written about Boettcher's wife Claudia who was pregnant at the time. Joey Stec described "It's You" as being about the establishment covering up information ranging from the Vietnam War to the Assassination of John F. Kennedy and Assassination of Robert F. Kennedy, specifically noting the lyrics "You only let me see what you have planned for me / I guess they'll never be anything more". Doug Rhodes stated that "It's You" was his personal favourite song on the album. Lee Mallory described "I'm With You" as being written on Easter Sunday in 1966 after going to a love in at Elysian Park in Los Angeles. Mallory developed the chords for "There is Nothing More to Say" while Curt wrote the melody and Michael Fennelly wrote the lyrics. The final song "Anthem (Begin)" was developed by Curt and Doug. Sandy Salisbury described the song "Karmic Dream Sequence #1" as "perhaps the essence of the Millennium experience", by developing music that evokes "feelings from the deepest parts of what we were doing at that time in our lives. We were at once spontaneous in artistic expression and fixed in who we were as individuals." The song's lyrics were written by Boettcher and Lee with Boettcher and Keith Olsen developing the music. The song included a Japanese woman invited by Boettcher to play the koto on the song. Mallory spoke on "Karmic Dream Sequence #1", explaining that it came from a return trip visiting his grandmother for the last time before she had died. He wrote the first and second verse and showed it to Curt who wrote the bridge for it. "5 A.M." came from songwriter Sandy Salisbury who desired to "write a melodic piece about the quite early-morning time" Salisbury drew from his love of bossa nova music for this song, specifically Antônio Carlos Jobim.

== Release ==
[After a private preview of the album, 27] people stormed my house the following evening and wanted to hear the record again. Strangers call me at all hours and ask if I'll play the album for them. It's really an incredible scene.

– Gary Usher, August 1968

Before the release of Begin, a single of "It's You" backed with "I Just Want To Be Your Friend" was released as the album's first single in June 1968 on Columbia Records. In anticipation of the album's release, Columbia scheduled public listening parties in Hollywood, Chicago and New York. The label invited local disk jockeys, program directions, and members of the underground press to attend the events, at which members of the band and Gary Usher, Columbia's West Coast A&R man, answered press questions.

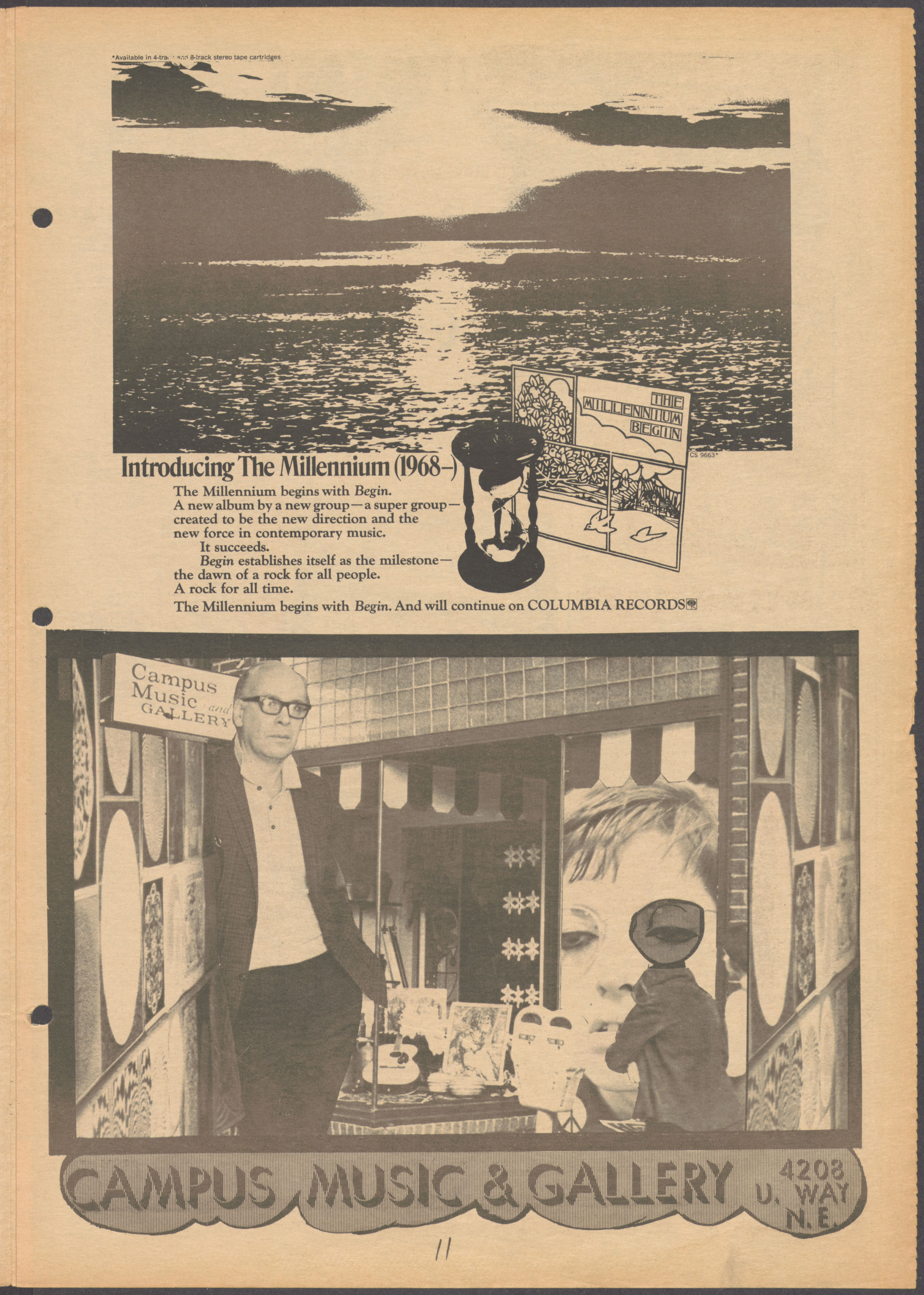
Advertisement for Begin, 1968

Begin was released in August 1968 on Columbia Records where it received favourable reviews from music critics but described as a "commercial disaster" and failed to chart in the United Kingdom or United States. This led to the group not recording any follow-up records. Following the release, Boettcher created Together Records in order to secure greater artistic freedom.

In 1990, Begin was re-issued on compact disc. This version included two bonus tracks ("Just About the Same" and "Blight") which were recordings made after the release of Begin for a 7" single release that Columbia rejected. The re-issues of Begin on labels such as Rev-Ola encouraged former Millennium members to contact Joe Foster of Sonic Past Music allowing them access to original demos of the group to be re-released on the compilation album Pieces.

== Reception ==
Professional ratings
Review scores
Source	Rating
AllMusic	4.5/5 stars
Uncut	5/5 stars

Throughout the 1990s, as pop-oriented music groups like Saint Etienne, the High Llamas and the Olivia Tremor Control started out, record collectors and music critics started to re-assess 1960s pop music, which led to the growth in popularity of Begin.

From retrospective reviews, AllMusic described the album as a "bona fide lost classic" and that it was on the same level as "more widely popular albums from the era" such as The Notorious Byrd Brothers. The review praised the production and described the songwriting as "sterling and innovative, never straying into the type of psychedelic overindulgence which marred so many records from this era," specifically noting the song "It's You" to be "as powerful and fully realized as the era ever produced, easily on par with songs by the Beach Boys and the Byrds – and, yes, even the Beatles."

In the book The Mojo Collection, the magazine referred to the album as "strikingly modern", with the songs being "as strong as the production". Reviewing the compilation album Pieces, Dominique Leone described Begin as "probably the single greatest 60s pop record produced in L.A. outside of the Beach Boys." Uncut noted that "Boettcher's ability to dismantle and reassemble structures gives the listener infinite possibilities for aural delight," and that "You could write a manual about 'To Claudia on a Thursday' alone, or you could simply lie back and let the cut-up sounds wash over your brain." The review concluded that, "If you want to see how far pop music can go, then [Present Tense and Begin] are essential."

=== Legacy ===
Following the album's release, artists began covering songs from the album. This included CB Victoria who covered "To Claudia on Thursday". "There is Nothing More to Say" has been covered by Chris Knight and Maureen McCormick of The Brady Bunch fame with slightly re-written lyrics. Other songs, such as "It's You", have been covered by Japanese groups such as Clingon, whose version charted in Japan.

Former Millennium members Stec and Mallory were still performing songs from Begin in their live shows decades after the album's release.

== Track listing ==
Credits adapted from Begin reissue back cover and vinyl sticker from Sundazed.

Side A
No.	Title	Writer(s)	Length
1.	"Prelude"	Ron Edgar, Doug Rhodes	1:18
2.	"To Claudia on Thursday"	Michael Fennelly, Joey Stec	3:25
3.	"I Just Want to Be Your Friend"	Curt Boettcher	2:33
4.	"5 A.M."	Sandy Salisbury	2:38
5.	"I'm With You"	Lee Mallory	2:35
6.	"The Island"	Boettcher	3:18
7.	"Sing to Me"	Mallory	2:14

Side B
No.	Title	Writer(s)	Length
1.	"It's You"	Fennelly, Stec	3:21
2.	"Some Sunny Day"	Mallory	3:12
3.	"It Won't Always Be the Same"	Fennelly, Stec	2:57
4.	"The Know It All"	Boettcher	2:40
5.	"Karmic Dream Sequence #1"	Boettcher, Mallory	5:56
6.	"There Is Nothing More to Say"	Boettcher, Fennelly, Mallory	2:24
7.	"Anthem (Begin)"	Boettcher, Mallory, Rhodes, Salisbury	2:38
Total length:			41:09

== Personnel ==
Credits adapted from Begin reissue back cover from Sundazed.

- Curt Boettcher – producer, performer
- Keith Olsen – producer
- Ron Edgar – performer
- Lee Mallory – performer
- Joey Stec – performer
- Doug Rhodes – performer
- Mike Fennelly – performer
- Sandy Salisbury – performer
- Gary Usher – executive coordination
- Geller and Butler Advertising – album design
- Bob Brown – personal management and associate

== See also ==
- 1968 in music

== Footnotes ==
=== Sources ===
- Howard, David N. (2004). Sonic Alchemy: Visionary Music Producers and Their Maverick Recordings. Hal Leonard Corporation. ISBN 0634055607.
- Irvin, Jim; McLear, Colin, eds. (2007). The Mojo Collection (4 ed.). Canongate Books. ISBN 978-1847676436.
