= It's You (The Millennium song) =

Single by the Millennium

from the album Begin
- B-side: "I Just Want to Be Your Friend"
- Released: June 1968
- Recorded: March 1968
- Studio: Columbia Studios
- Genre: Sunshine pop
- Length: 3:21
- Label: Columbia
- Songwriter(s): Michael Fennelly; Joey Stec
- Producer(s): Curt Boettcher; Keith Olsen

The Millennium singles chronology
"It's You" (1968)	"To Claudia on Thursday" (1968)

"It's You" is a song by the American sunshine pop band the Millennium, featured on their 1968 album Begin. Written by Michael Fennelly and Joey Stec, the song was produced by band leader Curt Boettcher and Keith Olsen. A veiled protest song, "It's You" features lyrics inspired by government censorship and contemporary conspiracy theories.

It was released in June 1968 as the lead single from Begin, as well as the band's debut single, paired with Boettcher's composition "I Just Want to Be Your Friend" as a B-side. The single was a commercial disappointment, failing to chart in the United States or United Kingdom. This performance presaged the eventual reception of the song's parent album the following month, which received positive reviews but again did not chart in either territory.

"It's You" has been retrospectively viewed favorably by commentators for its musical style and vocal performances, with some even describing it as among the greatest songs of the 1960s. Additionally, it has been noted for its similarities to contemporary works by the Beatles.

== Background ==
"It's You" was written by Michael Fennelly and Joey Stec, one of four songs the pair wrote for the group. Stec described "It's You" as being about the establishment covering up information ranging from the Vietnam War to the Assassination of John F. Kennedy and Assassination of Robert F. Kennedy, specifically noting the lyrics "You only let me see what you have planned for me / I guess they'll never be anything more". Fellow Millennium member Doug Rhodes stated that "It's You" was his personal favourite song on the album.

== Critical reception ==
In a retrospective review of Begin in AllMusic, writer Matthew Greenwald described "It's You" to be "as powerful and fully realized as the era ever produced, easily on par with songs by the Beach Boys and the Byrds -- and, yes, even the Beatles."

In a review of the band's compilation album Pieces, Dominique Leone described "It's You" as an underrated song compared to other music released in 1968, praising its "pristine harmony vocals", and comparing it to songs by the Beatles, specifically noting its bassline as similar to "Baby, You're a Rich Man."
