= List of sunshine pop artists =

This is a list of artists whose body of work has been described as sunshine pop (also called "soft pop").

== 0-9 ==
- The 5th Dimension

== A ==
- The Association

== B ==
- The Bobby Fuller Four
- The Buckinghams

== C ==
- Carpenters
- Cyrkle
- The Cowsills

== D ==
- Design

== E ==
- Eternity's Children

== F ==
- The Free Design

== G ==
- Gary Lewis & the Playboys
- Gary Puckett & The Union Gap
- The Grass Roots

== H ==
- Harpers Bizarre
- The Hillside Singers
- The Hobbits

== I ==
- Los Íberos

== L ==
- The Left Banke

== M ==
- The Mamas & the Papas
- The Merry-Go-Round
- The Millennium
- The Monkees

== N ==
- Roger Nichols & the Small Circle of Friends

== P ==
- Paul Revere & the Raiders
- Peppermint Rainbow
- Peppermint Trolley Company
- Pic-Nic

== R ==
- Johnny Rivers

== S ==
- Sagittarius
- The Sandpipers
- Nancy Sinatra
- Spanky and Our Gang
- Strawberry Alarm Clock
- The Sunshine Company

== T ==
- The Turtles
- Twinn Connexion

== Y ==
- The Yellow Balloon
- Young Rascals
