= The Goldebriars =

- Origin: United States
- Genres: Folk rock, sunshine pop
- Years active: 1964–1965
- Label: Epic
- Past members: Sheri Holmberg; Dotti Holmberg; Curt Boettcher; Ron Neilson; Ron Edgar
- Website: goldebriars.com

The Goldebriars were an American folk quartet in the early 1960s, most notable for including a young Curt Boettcher as a guitarist and vocalist. The group also included two sisters, Dotti and Sheri Holmberg, with Ron Neilson as lead guitarist and banjo player.

== Career ==
They recorded two obscure albums for Epic Records in 1964 before adding drummer Ron Edgar to their lineup, who would later be a part of the groups The Music Machine and The Millennium. They recorded a third album in late 1964. A single from this proposed album, "June Bride Baby" b/w "I'm Gonna Marry You" was released in early 1965, but the group broke up afterwards and the album remains unreleased.

Boettcher would go on as a record producer, songwriter and musician, eventually putting together The Millennium. Dotti Holmberg, Sundazed Music released an album of demos that she recorded in the mid-1960s called Sometimes Happy Times, including one that had ended up on the Magic Time anthology, and the song ("I Sing My Song") that would later be included on the second Sagittarius album. She also maintains a website dedicated to the group, and has published an eBook about the group titled "Whatever Happened to Jezebel?". Ron Neilson went on to compose and publish two acclaimed albums under the New Harmony Records label through CD Baby, Two Guitars, One Heart with guitarist, John Bellar in 2007, and a solo album, New Day's Promise, in 2017. The first features Weissenborn & Resonator Acoustic Guitar Duets, wholly-unique combination of beautiful sounding lap-style acoustic guitars. John Bellar was America's National Resonator Guitar Champion in the Fall of 2005, where he and Ron Neilson met in the winner's circle. For nearly twenty years, Ron Neilson has played and composed exclusively for the Weissenborn-style, Hawaiian acoustic guitar. He has been a studio musician and stage performer. Two Guitars, One Heart, was recorded at Lava Tracks Studio in Wiamea, Hawaii. New Day's Promise features additional original, lyrical compositions performed by Ron Neilson on Weissenborn lap-style acoustic guitar.

A compilation CD of The Goldebriars' Epic material, with additional demos, was issued by Now Sounds in 2015. The 30-track collection was produced by Steve Stanley, with liner notes written by Curt Boettcher scholar Dawn Eden Goldstein.

== Discography ==
- "Your Special Introduction to the Goldebriars" (7-inch EP)
- "Pretty Girls and Rolling Stones" (Boettcher/Neilson) b/w "Shenandoah" (trad. arr.) Epic 9673 (7-inch single)
- The Goldebriars (album, Epic LN 26087)
- Straight Ahead! (album, Epic BN 26114 (stereo), LN 26114 (mono))
- "Castle on the Corner" (Goldsteinn) b/w "I've Got to Love Somebody" (trad. arr.) (Epic 9719 (single))
- "June Bride Baby" (Goldsteinn/Ross) b/w "I'm Gonna Marry You" (Goldsteinn) (Epic 9806 (single))
- Climbing Stars (CD album of unreleased material released September 20, 2006, Sony Music Direct, Japan)

Sony Music Direct in Japan released CDs of the first two Goldebriars' original albums on March 24, 2006.
