= Sandy (Sandy Salisbury album) =

Studio album by Sandy Salisbury
- Released: 2001
- Recorded: 1969
- Genre: Sunshine pop
- Label: Sonic Past Music
- Producer: Curt Boettcher & Keith Olsen

Professional ratings
Review scores
Source	Rating
Allmusic	link

Sandy is a solo album by Sandy Salisbury, formerly of the Millenium. The album was originally recorded in 1969 for Gary Usher's Together Records, a venture that was brief enough that the label collapsed before the album (along with several others) could be released. It would eventually come out in 2001, by which time Salisbury had become a children's book author.

There are three versions of the album on CD, each one featuring different bonus tracks. The original release by Poptones featured just one bonus track, an instrumental version of "Once I Knew a Little Dog". The Japanese version features three bonus tracks. All three tracks are demos, and two of the songs weren't part of the original album. The most recent release, by Rev-Ola, contains 13 bonus tracks.

== Production ==
Of the album's production, Salisbury reflected:

"I think Columbia had had enough of us because we spent way too much money. So they– Curt [Boettcher] and Gary [Usher] and Keith [Olsen]– moved on to a recording studio out in the valley called Sound City. And so we recorded that album in Sound City. And I, that was a great experience. I was just like working with the Millennium except it was just me and Curt. And I think we brought a couple people in. Lee Mallory, he worked on some, we had like a steel guitar player come in, which I loved."

== Track listing ==
1. "I Just Don't Know How to Say Goodbye"
2. "Spell on Me"
3. "The Hills of Vermont"
4. "The Good 'Ol Goodtimes"
5. "Come Softly"
6. "On and on She Goes"
7. "Cecily"
8. "Do Unto Others"
9. "Once I Knew a Little Dog"
10. "Baby Listen"
11. "Goody Goodbye"

== Personnel ==
Taken from the liner notes for the 2000 Poptones Records CD Release

- Vocals, Acoustic Guitar – Sandy Salisbury
- Acoustic Guitar, Backing Vocals – Curt Boettcher, Lee Mallory
- Bass – Jerry Scheff
- Electric Guitar – Mike Deasy, Waddy Wachtel
- Electric Guitar, Harmonica – Ben Benay
- Keyboards – Douglas Rhodes*
- Pedal Steel Guitar – Orville 'Red' Rhodes*
- Percussion, Marimba, Vibraphone – Toxie French*
- Producer – Curt Boettcher
- Remastered By [Sound Restoration] – Joe Foster, Nick Robbins
- Synthesizer [Moog] – Gary Usher
