= My World Fell Down =

1966 song performed by The Ivy League

Single by The Ivy League
- B-side: "When You're Young"
- Released: 1966
- Recorded: 1966
- Length: 2:51
- Label: Pye
- Songwriters: John Carter, Geoff Stephens
- Producer: Terry Kennedy

The Ivy League singles chronology
| "Funny How Love Can Be" (1965) | "My World Fell Down" (1966) | "Running 'Round in Circles" (1966) |

"My World Fell Down" is a song written by John Carter and Geoff Stephens, and first recorded by the English pop rock band the Ivy League, on Pye Records, in 1966. The song was covered a year later by the American sunshine pop group Sagittarius, whose version charted on the Billboard Hot 100. Sagittarius's version of the composition has remained highly sought after among record collectors for its close resemblance to the Pet Sounds-era Beach Boys.

== Background ==
"My World Fell Down"
- 1967 Danish picture sleeve.

Single by Sagittarius

from the album Present Tense
- B-side: "Libra"
- Released: May 15, 1967
- Recorded: 1967
- Genre: Sunshine pop
- Length: 3:37
- Label: Columbia
- Songwriters: John Carter, Geoff Stephens
- Producer: Gary Usher

Sagittarius singles chronology
| "My World Fell Down" (1967) | "Another Time" (1967) |

The Ivy League, a Beach Boys-inspired band led by John Carter, recorded "My World Fell Down" in 1966, and scored a minor hit in the UK. In its original form, the song is reminiscent of the Turtles' hit tune "Happy Together", with a minor-key string-led verse, and baroque instrumental breaks. Upon hearing the band's composition, record producer Gary Usher was convinced that he could rearrange "My World Fell Down" into a major commercial success, with a duo he was then-currently producing, Chad & Jeremy. However, the two refused to record another musical artist's song, leaving Usher without a willing participant to record "My World Fell Down". Undeterred, Usher recruited Los Angeles session musicians, along with longtime friends Glen Campbell and Bruce Johnston, and songwriter Curt Boettcher to record the song under the moniker Sagittarius.

Usher's reworking of the composition was arranged in the same vein as the Ivy League's original recording; however, Usher also adapted his influences from producing the Beach Boys into the song. The quasi-classical pop keyboards and string arrangements draw comparisons from the group's albums Pet Sounds and Smile, particularly the song "Good Vibrations". Campbell's lead vocals on the melancholy verses likewise are comparable to Brian Wilson's singing, and the vocal harmonies are much like those heard at the end of the instrumental break on the Beach Boys' tune. Music historian Richie Unterberger, speaking about "My World Fell Down"'s most unusual quality, says "The instrumental break is downright weird for a 1967 pop record, with an extended wordless vocal chorus eventually stopping and giving way to a way-extended musique concrète break of carnival and crowd noises, as if the world is mocking the narrator's heartbreak". Usher, after "My World Fell Down" was released, concluded that this collage of sounds was too experimental to have a serious opportunity to be Top 40 hit.

In June 1967, the song was released as the A-side to Sagittarius's debut single, and reached number 70 on the Billboard Hot 100 and number 48 in Canada. When "My World Fell Down" was issued on the band's first album, Present Tense, the song lacked the same artistic statement that the musique concrète section delivered to the composition as it was removed from it altogether. Due to the obvious influences taken from Wilson's work on Pet Sounds and Smile, "My World Fell Down" is regularly described as "the best single the Beach Boys never made", and one of Usher's most accomplished masterpieces. In 1972, the song was recognized on the groundbreaking compilation album Nuggets: Original Artyfacts from the First Psychedelic Era, 1965–1968.
