= The Blades of Grass =

- Also known as: The Furnace Men
- Origin: Maplewood, New Jersey, United States
- Genres: Sunshine pop; folk rock
- Years active: 1967–1969
- Label: Jubilee
- Past members: Bruce Ames; David Gordon; Frank DiChiara; Marc Black

The Blades of Grass were an American sunshine pop band formed in Maplewood, New Jersey, in 1967. Competing with the abundance of sunshine pop groups originating from California, the Blades of Grass are most-known for their nationally charting rendition of the song "Happy". The band also released an album called The Blades of Grass Are Not for Smoking before disbanding.

== History ==
Formed in 1967, with a lineup consisting of Bruce Ames (rhythm guitar, vocals), David Gordon (drums, organ), Frank DiChiara (bass guitar, vocals), and Marc Black (lead guitar, vocals), the band was originally known as the Furnace Men to allude to the basement the group typically practiced in. Becoming a popular attraction in their hometown, the group incited interest in managing partners Frank Latagona and Walter Gollander, who promised to find the Furnace Men a recording contract. Latagona and Gollander stood by their offer, promoting the band to Jubilee Records in mid-1967. Record producers, according to Ames, changed their name to the Blades of Grass because they "thought that our sound was bright and clear and that the Furnace Men sounded dark and dirty. As our producers, we had no choice but to reluctantly agree to the name change".

They recorded several cover versions for the record label, including "Happy" for the band's debut single. Unbeknownst to the Blades of Grass, another sunshine pop group, the Sunshine Company, also released their own rendition of "Happy" at almost the same time. Ames recalled that "We were blindsided and shocked when we were informed that there was another version of 'Happy.' As I remember it, our managers were equally surprised and upset". Having to compete with another release, the Blades of Grass's rendition of "Happy" did exceedingly well on the East coast, but the Sunshine Company's performed better on the West coast. The Blades of Grass had a moderate hit with "Happy" reaching number 87 on the Billboard Hot 100, while their competitor peaked at number 50. In Canada their version reached number 34. Surprisingly enough, the group's second single, "I Love You Alice B. Toklas" from the film of the same name, was also simultaneously distributed in early-1968 with another version by Harpers Bizarre (whose version was used in the film) and failed to chart.

More releases followed throughout 1968 that failed to chart, including their debut album, The Blades of Grass Are Not for Smoking. The Blades of Grass were predisposed in the studio to other songwriters' material, though Black, the band's main composer, claimed to have penned nearly 100 songs during the group's existence. The album contained heavily orchestrated instrumentals and airy vocal harmonies that were coherent with many California-based sunshine groups. A few obscure non-LP singles were released in early 1969, but the Blades of Grass, after its members graduated high school, disbanded within the year. In 2002, Rev-Ola Records reissued the album on CD with liner notes by Steve Stanley. The release included non-LP singles as bonus tracks.
