= Magic Time =

Magic Time may refer to:

- Magic Time (Van Morrison album), 2005
- Magic Time (Opa album), 1977
- Magic Time (compilation album), a 2001 compilation album
- Magic Time (novel series), by Marc Scott Zicree, 2002-2005

== See also ==
- Time and Magik, a trilogy of text adventure games by Level 9
