= Michael Fennelly (musician) =

American musician

Michael Fennelly (born April 4, 1949) is an American musician known for his work as a singer and songwriter in the 1960s and 1970s, notably in The Millennium and Crabby Appleton.

Fennelly was born in New York, United States, the second of three children. He grew up in Pennsylvania and Westfield, New Jersey, where he attended high school. He began taking guitar lessons when he was nine years old. At the age of 17 he hitchhiked to Los Angeles, and began performing in clubs there. By 1967, he had become a member of songwriter/producer Curt Boettcher's studio-based collective of musicians. He contributed electric sitar and vocals to the album Present Tense by Sagittarius, and then became one of the five singer/guitarist/songwriters included in The Millennium, the sunshine pop group assembled by Boettcher.

In 1969 he joined an existing band, Stonehenge, as lead singer, guitarist and songwriter, changing their name to Crabby Appleton. The band were signed to Elektra Records, and released two albums, with Fennelly's writing becoming influenced by such emerging musicians as Neil Young and Stephen Stills. Their single "Go Back" from their first album, written and sung by Fennelly, and produced by Don Gallucci, reached No. 36 on the Billboard Hot 100 in mid 1970.

Following the disbanding of the group, Fennelly recorded two solo records. The first, Lane Changer (1974), was recorded in England with ex-Zombie Chris White producing and members of the group Argent contributing to some tracks. Jeff Beck played the lead guitar on the song "Watch Yerself". Fennelly's second solo album, Stranger's Bed, was recorded in Los Angeles with Denny Bruce producing and Keith Olsen engineering. However, neither was successful. Fennelly also recorded with Steely Dan; he sings the high harmony on "The Boston Rag" from Countdown to Ecstasy, their second album.

Fennelly remained in the music business thereafter, and currently lives in Portland, Oregon. Fennelly's music has been covered by contemporary artists, including John Verity's cover of "Touch My Soul" on his 2014 album Tone Hound, and "Go Back" by The Sirens on the 2007 More is More album.

In 2013, Sundazed Records released Love Can Change Everything: Demos 1967-1972, which contains demo recordings of Fennelly's songs produced during the Millennium era, Crabby Appleton songs, and songs from his solo release.
