= Present Tense (Sagittarius album) =

Studio album by Sagittarius
- Released: July 3, 1968
- Genre: Sunshine pop; psychedelic pop; orchestral pop; baroque pop
- Length: 27:53
- Label: Columbia
- Producer: Gary Usher, Curt Boettcher

Sagittarius chronology
Present Tense (1968)	The Blue Marble (1969)

Singles from Present Tense
- 1. "My World Fell Down" Released: May 15, 1967; 2. "Hotel Indiscreet" Released: August 22, 1967; 3. "Another Time" Released: December 5, 1967; 4. "You Know I've Found a Way" Released: April 9, 1968; 5. "I'm Not Living Here" Released: July 31, 1968

Professional ratings
Review scores
Source	Rating
Allmusic	link
Uncut	5/5 stars

Present Tense is the first Sagittarius album, released in 1968 by Columbia Records. Though the record was basically a Gary Usher solo project, he enlisted many top LA session musicians, and heavily utilized Curt Boettcher as a songwriter, musician, vocalist, and producer (even going so far as to include two tracks that Boettcher had produced on his own as the leader of the group The Ballroom). The album also contains the recording "My World Fell Down", which had no Boettcher involvement, albeit the LP version was edited, with the musique concrète bridge from the single version being excised (though a few extra bars of music were added in between the first and second verses). The single "Hotel Indiscreet" also had a similar fate when it reached the LP.

The album was reissued on CD by Sundazed Music in 1997 with 9 bonus tracks. Two of these are the original single versions of "My World Fell Down" and "Hotel Indiscreet", as well as another track from The Ballroom, a Sandy Salisbury song, and the instrumental track for a song that was recorded by Chad & Jeremy. In 2006 the album was reissued again on CD in Japan by Sony in a Mini-LP style sleeve, featuring the album but with different bonus tracks, then again in 2009 by Rev-Ola Records but with the same track listing as the Sundazed reissue. The track listing given below reflects the original LP.

== Track listing ==
Side one
No.	Title	Writer(s)	Length
1.	"Another Time"	Curt Boettcher	2:39
2.	"Song to the Magic Frog (Will You Ever Know)"	Boettcher, Michele O'Malley	2:48
3.	"You Know I've Found a Way"	Boettcher, Lee Mallory	2:00
4.	"The Keeper of the Games"	Boettcher	1:54
5.	"Glass"	Ernie Sheldon, Larry Marks	2:26
6.	"Would You Like to Go"	Boettcher, Gary Alexander	2:36

Side two
No.	Title	Writer(s)	Length
7.	"My World Fell Down"	John Carter, Geoff Stephens	2:55
8.	"Hotel Indiscreet"	Jimmy Griffin, Michael Z. Gordon	2:11
9.	"I'm Not Living Here"	Boettcher	2:26
10.	"Musty Dusty"	Boettcher	3:12
11.	"The Truth Is Not Real"	Gary Usher	2:46
Total length:			27:53

Sundazed and Rev-Ola CD reissue bonus tracks
No.	Title	Writer(s)	Length
12.	"Artificial Light (Of All the Living Lies)"	Andy Badale, Estelle Levitt	2:49
13.	"Get the Message"	Griffin, Gordon	2:48
14.	"Mass #586"	Usher	2:50
15.	"Love's Fatal Way"	Boettcher, Randy Naylor	2:49
16.	"My World Fell Down" (mono single version)	Carter, Stephens	3:45
17.	"Hotel Indiscreet" (mono single version)	Griffin, Gordon	2:20
18.	"Lonely Girl"	Sandy Salisbury	2:33
19.	"The Keeper of the Games" (demo version)	Boettcher	1:47
20.	"Sister Marie" (instrumental)	David Morrow	3:19

Japanese CD bonus tracks
No.	Title	Writer(s)	Length
12.	"My World Fell Down" (mono single version)	Carter, Stephens	3:47
13.	"Hotel Indiscreet" (mono single version)	Griffin, Gordon	2:22
14.	"Another Time" (mono single version)	Boettcher	2:44
15.	"You Know I've Found a Way" (mono single version)	Boettcher, Mallory	2:04
16.	"The Truth Is Not Real" (mono single version)	Usher	3:03
17.	"I'm Not Living Here" (mono single version)	Boettcher, Usher, Olsen	2:24
18.	"The Keeper of the Games" (mono single version)	Boettcher, Usher, Olsen	1:49
19.	"Virgo"	Usher	2:26
20.	"Libra"	Usher	4:06
21.	"Pisces"	Usher	2:54
