= Graham Salisbury =

American children's writer and pop musician

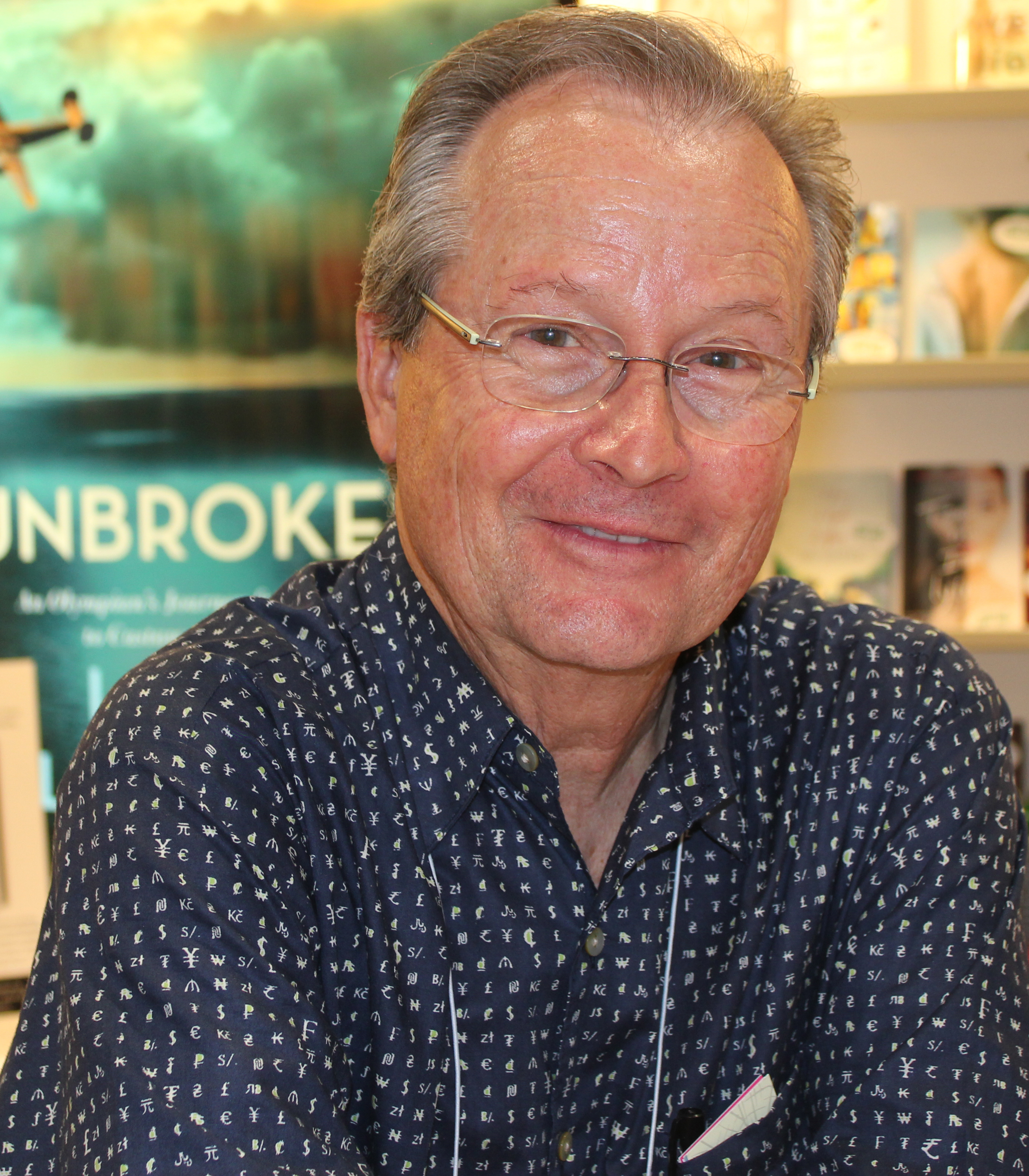
- Salisbury in June 2014
- Born: April 11, 1944 (age 82); Philadelphia, Pennsylvania, U.S.
- Education: Hawaii Preparatory Academy
- Occupations: Writer, musician
- Writing career
- Pen name: Sandy Salisbury
- Period: 1992–present (as writer)
- Genres: Children's fiction, historical novel
- Website: grahamsalisbury.com

Sandy Salisbury
- Genres: Sunshine pop
- Years active: Mid-1960s-present
- Labels: Columbia Records, Together Records, Rev-ola, CD-Baby, Sonic Past Music
- Formerly of: The Ballroom, The Millennium

Graham Salisbury (born April 11, 1944) is an American children's writer. His best known work is Under the Blood Red Sun, a historical novel that features a Japanese-American boy and his family during World War II. Under the name Sandy Salisbury he was a pop musician in the late 1960s, notably with the Millennium.

== Biography ==
Salisbury was born in Philadelphia. He grew up in Hawaii and lived in Kailua, Oahu. Later he attended Hawaii Preparatory Academy in Kamuela, Hawaii.

Salisbury was a musician in the late 1960s and is best known for his association with Curt Boettcher. He was a member of Boettcher's groups the Millennium and the Ballroom (whose 1966 album remained unreleased until 2001).

As a session vocalist and musician, he performed on hit recordings by such bands as the Association, Paul Revere and the Raiders, Tommy Roe and many others.

On The Millennium's only album, Begin, Salisbury played guitar, sung and contributed one self-penned song, "5 A.M." Though an album and several singles were released, the unprecedented expense of the recording of Begin may have contributed to CBS Records souring on the project. The album met with tepid sales and disappeared for many years before it was rediscovered by Sunshine Pop enthusiasts and grew to become a cult classic.

After the demise of the Millennium, Salisbury pursued a solo career, with Boettcher producing, on Gary Usher's Together Records label.

In 1975–76, "Sandy" was in Bergamo, Italy studying Montessori Elementary education. He participated in the congregation of the Church of Jesus Christ of Latter-day Saints and spoke in Italian to his friends there. At the final exam, he became nervous over a question and the examiner asked him what he would rather do. Not thinking that a different question/demonstration was being offered him, he responded he would rather be playing his guitar. He returned to Utah and married.

In the early 2000s, compilations of his work started appearing, including the release of his late 1960s solo album.

Salisbury worked several jobs before writing children's fiction (under his given name). He has also resumed his musical activities, albeit sporadically, under the name "Little Johnny Coconut".

In 2014, a movie was made of his historical novel Under the Blood Red Sun.

He lives with his family in Lake Oswego, Oregon.

== Books ==
- Blue Skin of the Sea: a novel in stories (Delacorte Press/Dell, 1992)
- Under the Blood Red Sun (Delacorte, 1994)
- Shark Bait (Delacorte, 1997)
- Jungle Dogs (Delacorte, 1998)
- Lord of the Deep (Delacorte, 2001)
- Island Boyz: short stories (Wendy Lamb Books/Random House, 2002)
- Bad Day for Baseball, in Shattered: Stories of Children and War, ed. Jennifer Armstrong (Laurel Leaf/Dell, 2003) ISBN 0-440-23765-3
- Night of the Howling Dogs (Wendy Lamb, 2007)
- Eyes of the Emperor (Wendy Lamb, 2005)
- House of the Red Fish (Wendy Lamb, 2006)
- Hunt for the Bamboo Rat (Wendy Lamb, forthcoming September 2014)

=== Calvin Coconut ===
Children's novels by Salisbury, illustrated by Jacqueline Rogers, and published by the Random House imprint Wendy Lamb Books; set primarily in Hawaii.

- Calvin Coconut: Trouble Magnet (2009)
- Calvin Coconut: Zippy Fix (2009)
- Calvin Coconut: Dog Heaven (2010)
- Calvin Coconut: Zoo Breath (2010)
- Calvin Coconut: Hero of Hawaii (2011)
- Calvin Coconut: Kung Fooey (2011)
- Calvin Coconut: Man Trip (2012), volume 7, 133 pp. – Calvin is in the fourth grade OCLC 815735050
- Calvin Coconut: Rocket Ride (2012)
- Calvin Coconut: Extra Famous (2013)

== Discography ==
As Sandy Sallisbury

- Sandy (2001, Sonic Past Music)
- The Millennium (1999, Tyler Sorenson Recording Studio)
- Falling to Pieces (2002, Rev-Ola)
- Everything For You (2004, Dreamsville Records)
- Catchy (2006, CD Baby)

As Little Johnny Coconut

- I Love Sunshine Pop (2010, Sonic Past Music)
- Rocket Ride (2012, Sonic Past Music)
