= Sonic Past Music =

American record label

- Type: Private
- Industry: Music
- Founded: 1998; 28 years ago
- Headquarters: Southern California
- Key people: Joey Stec
- Products: Albums, CDs
- Website: www.sonicpastmusic.com

Sonic Past Music is a record label in Southern California that specializes in releasing previously unpublished music from mainstream artists. Most of the music from the label is from artists from the 1960s and 1970s sunshine pop, psychedelic pop era.

Artists include names like The Millennium, Curt Boettcher, Lee Mallory, Joey Stec, Sandy Salisbury, and Randy Meisner from The Eagles, Richie Sambora from Bon Jovi, Huey Lewis from his early days in Clover, Jawk-Dog (members of The Doobie Brothers and Creedence Clearwater Revival) and Rick Springfield.

The company was formed in 1998 by Joey Stec of The Millennium.
