= Charlie Ross (singer) =

American singer-songwriter

Charlie Ross, sometimes billed as Charles Ross III, is an American singer who had some chart success as part of a group, and as a pop and country singer. He was born in Greenville, Mississippi. He was employed as a disk jockey at WDDT, before joining the group Phantom, which eventually became Eternity's Children. While still a member of Eternity's Children, he released his first solo record. In the mid-1970s he was working as a disk jockey at KFJZ. During this time he released two singles for Big Tree Records which charted nationally in the pop field. "Thanks for the Smiles" reached #61 in 1975, and "Without Your Love (Mr. Jordan)" just missed the top-40 at #42 in 1976. The single was re-imagined for a different audience, and became a Billboard "Top Country Pick" and "Without Your Love" charted higher in the country genre, at #13, in 1976. He had more charting country singles for Town House Records in 1982, where his "The High Cost of Loving" appeared at #33, and "Are We In Love (Or Am I)" was #45. Subsequently he continued his radio hosting duties, and started his own companies in communications and music production.
