= Crabby Appleton =

American rock band

- Origin: Los Angeles, California, United States
- Genres: Rock, power pop
- Years active: 1970–1972
- Label: Elektra
- Past members: Michael Fennelly; Casey Foutz; Hank Harvey; Felix "Flaco" Falcon; Phil Jones

Crabby Appleton was an American rock band in the early 1970s. Fronted by singer-songwriter Michael Fennelly, they scored a Top 40 hit with their first single, "Go Back."

== History ==
Though nearly everyone in the group was from a Los Angeles, California-based band called Stonehenge, the group's line-up was revamped with the introduction of Michael Fennelly, who had been one of the principal vocalists and songwriters in The Millennium. The group's other members included Felix "Flaco" Falcon (percussion), Casey Foutz (keyboards), Hank Harvey (bass), and Phil Jones (drums). Jones, previously of Oskaloosa, Iowa, but more recently of Laurel Canyon, helped form the band after meeting Fennelly at Thee Experience, a club on the Sunset Strip. Jones had heard the song, "To Claudia on Thursday," which Fennelly wrote and sang with his group The Millennium, and, encouraged by record producer David Anderle, recruited Fennelly to join Stonehenge as lead singer, guitarist, and songwriter. The group was renamed Crabby Appleton after a character from the Tom Terrific cartoon.

Crabby Appleton signed with Elektra Records and recorded their first album Crabby Appleton, produced by Don Gallucci and released in 1970. The band's debut single, "Go Back," climbed to No. 36 on the Billboard Hot 100 chart. The band opened for the Doors, Sly and the Family Stone, Three Dog Night, Guess Who, ABBA, and George Carlin. They appeared on American Bandstand, the Real Don Steele Show, Something Else with John Byner, and enjoyed critical success. Both of their albums, Crabby Appleton and Rotten to the Core, received rave reviews in Rolling Stone and Creem magazines.

The band's second album, Rotten to the Core, was recorded in 1971, but sales were disappointing and the band split up. Following the disbanding of the group, Fennelly recorded two solo records: Lane Changer recorded in England in 1974; and Stranger's Bed, recorded in Los Angeles the following year.

Jones plays as a drummer and percussionist in the Los Angeles music scene and has recorded and toured with Tom Petty and the Heartbreakers, Joe Walsh, Roy Orbison, Cracker, Susanna Hoffs, Roger McGuinn, and is playing with the Waddy Wachtel Band.

Both Crabby Appleton albums have been reissued on CD by Collector's Choice Music, and "Go Back" has been released on many compilation albums.

== Discography ==
- Crabby Appleton (1970)
- Rotten to the Core! (1971)
