= Under the Blood Red Sun =

1995 historical novel by Graham Salisbury

- Author: Graham Salisbury
- Language: English
- Genre: Children's fiction, historical novel
- Published: 1995
- Publisher: Dana Satler Hankins
- Publication place: United States

Under the Blood Red Sun is a historical novel by Graham Salisbury, published in 1995. A feature film by Japanese American director Tim Savage and produced by Dana Satler Hankins, from a screenplay by Salisbury, was released in 2014.

== Plot summary ==
The novel details the adventure of Tomikazu Nakaji, a Japanese American boy, and his family during World War II, when Americans of Japanese descent were being sent to internment camps. Tomi lives in Hawaii, and witnesses the shocking attack on Pearl Harbor. The story centers on the racist persecution of Tomi's family by others, the government's suspicion of the Japanese, and the family's efforts to downplay their Japanese heritage. He is joined by his haole or white friend, Billy, when his father and grandfather are captured and brought to a prison camp. Their friend Sanji (age 19) is killed, and Tomi's dad is shot in the leg. Tomikazu Nakaji is determined to be an American. This is not easy for though he was born in Hawaii, his parents and grandfather were not; they were born in Japan, and they still cling to Japanese ways. In fact, Tomi's grandfather still insists that he is "Japanese" and he and Tomi's parents still talk about the need to honor the family. Tomi must never do anything which would bring "shame" to the family. However, Tomi knows that no matter what happens Billy and the others will stand by him. And, of course, there is always baseball.

== Film adaptation ==
The cast of the 2014 film adaptation includes actors Kyler Ki Sakamoto, Kalama Epstein, Dann Seki, Autumn Ogawa, Wil Kahele, and Chris Tashima, as well as a cameo appearance by Graham Salisbury. The film won numerous awards on the film festival circuit including the Spirit Award at the International Family Film Festival.

== Awards ==
1994 - Parent's Choice Honor Award

1994 - American Library Association, Best Book for Young Adults

1994 - Booklist Editor's Choice

1994 - Books in the Middle: Outstanding Book for the Middle School Reader

1995 - Teachers Choice, International Reading Association

1995 - YALSA - Best Books for Young Adults, American Library Association

1995 - Library of Congress: Notable Children's Book of the Year

1995 - Oregon Book Award

1995 - The Family Channel Seal of Quality

1995 - NY Public Library, Books for the Teen Age

1998 - Nene Award (Hawaii Young Reader's Choice)

1998 - Utah Young Adult Book Award Nominee

1998 - Rebecca Caudill Young Reader's Book Award Nominee

1999 - California Young Reader Medal Award

2014 - Phoenix Award Honor Book Award

== See also ==
- Eyes of the Emperor – Another related novel by the same author
