= Eyes of the Emperor =

2005 novel by Graham Salisbury

- Cover, Laurel-Leaf's edition of Eyes of the Emperor
- Author: Graham Salisbury
- Cover artist: Phil Heffernan
- Language: English
- Genre: Historical fiction
- Publisher: Laurel-Leaf
- Publication date: 2005
- Publication place: United States
- Media type: Print (hardback & paperback)
- ISBN: 978-0-440-22956-8
- OCLC: 83279336

Eyes of the Emperor is an American historical novel written by Graham Salisbury, and is currently published by Laurel-Leaf, which is an imprint of Random House Children's Books, in the United States in paperback. The first edition was published in 2005. The first edition was published by Wendy Lamb Books in hardcover format in the same year.

In 2006, Eyes of the Emperor won the Leslie Bradshaw Award for Young Adult Literature.

== Plot summary ==
The story starts in Honolulu, Hawaii in 1941, where a Japanese American boy, Eddy, lives. He has a brother, Herbie, and numerous friends. His friends are in the army, and Eddy, who is 16 years old, joins the US army by illegally altering his birth certificate to appear 18 years old. They enlist in Camp McCoy. Eddy's father Koji strongly opposes this as he feels that Eddy is betraying Japan, but soon changes his mind when Japan attacks Pearl Harbor, on December 7, 1941. Eddy and his Japanese American company must do manual labor, such as digging trenches, while the soldiers of other ethnicities go on with regular army training. He then is mobilized by Lieutenant Sweet to Cat Island, Mississippi along with his comrades. They then embark on a secret dog training mission commissioned by President Franklin D. Roosevelt: Dogs are trained to smell Japanese American soldiers, with the hope that when the dogs are released in the Pacific theater they will track and kill the Japanese soldiers. This severely demoralizes Eddy and his fellow soldiers. Later, when they commute from the island to the mainland, their boat motor stalls; when they call for assistance, the US Coast Guard comes and shoots their boat, suspecting that they are the enemy. Accidental attacks continue, and the treatment of the Japanese American soldiers becomes worse as World War II worsens. Eddy is nearly killed once when his dog's trainer, Smith, calls the dog back slightly late. The soldiers are forced to treat the dogs harshly against their will.

After a few weeks of grueling treatment of the Japanese American soldiers, the government observes and reevaluates this project after the dog tracks and locates a soldier of non-Japanese ethnicity. It is deemed unsuccessful, and Eddy is assigned to combat in the European theater with his comrades.

== Characters ==
Eddy Okubo
The protagonist of the book. He lives in Hawaii, and is a Japanese boy native to America. He is 16 years old at the time of the attack on Pearl Harbor. Eddy is more loyal to the United States than to his parents' home country, Japan. His father's name is Koji Okubo.
Pop (Koji Okubo)
Eddy's father. He was strongly opposed to Eddy joining the US army, but after the Pearl Harbor attack he favors Eddy's decision. Pop is a boatbuilder. He was loyal to Japan, but after the attack his loyalty changed, and he turned himself in to the immigration office for shame of his country.
Major Parrish
The main high-ranking officer in the book, and is very smart; knows Eddy and his friends from high school, where he was the mechanical drawing teacher
Chik
Usually has 2-3 girlfriends at a time, fun-loving partier, friend of Eddy Okubo
Cobra
Very strong and muscular, serious and moody, also friend of Eddy Okubo
Herbie Okubo
Eddy's younger brother

== See also ==
- Under the Blood Red Sun, an earlier novel about Japan, Hawaii, and World War II by Graham Salisbury. Eddy and Herbie both briefly appear in it, although Eddy's name was not mentioned.

== Sources ==
- Salisbury, Graham (2005). Eyes of the Emperor. Laurel-Leaf. p. 222. ISBN 978-0-440-22956-8.
