= Magic Time (compilation album) =

Compilation album by the Millennium, The Ballroom, and Sagittarius
- Released: May 29, 2001
- Recorded: c. December 1966 – October 4, 1968
- Genre: Sunshine pop
- Length: 2:56:17
- Label: Sundazed
- Producer: Curt Boettcher

The Millennium chronology
Begin (1968)	Magic Time (2001)

Professional ratings
Review scores
Source	Rating
Allmusic	link

Magic Time is an extensive three-disc compilation album containing music from the sunshine pop bands the Millennium, the Ballroom and Sagittarius and the artist Curt Boettcher. It was released in 2001.

It contains the entire Begin album by the Millennium and all of the single versions of songs from that album, as well as the entire previously unreleased album by the Ballroom and numerous demos by the Ballroom, Sagittarius and Boettcher.

== Track listing ==
=== Disc one: The Ballroom ===
No.	Title	Artist	Length
1.	"Spinning, Spinning, Spinning"	The Ballroom	2:42
2.	"Love's Fatal Way"	The Ballroom	2:53
3.	"Would You Like to Go"	The Ballroom	2:39
4.	"Magic Time"	The Ballroom	2:50
5.	"You Turn Me Around"	The Ballroom	2:42
6.	"Forever"	The Ballroom	2:23
7.	"It's a Sad World"	The Ballroom	3:52
8.	"I'll Grow Stronger"	The Ballroom	3:02
9.	"Musty Dusty"	The Ballroom	3:16
10.	"Crazy Dreams"	The Ballroom	2:57
11.	"Lead Me to Love"	The Ballroom	2:48
12.	"A Time for Everything"	The Ballroom	2:37
13.	"Baby, Please Don't Go"	The Ballroom	3:09
14.	"Would You Like to Go (instrumental)"	The Ballroom	2:42
15.	"Forever (instrumental)"	The Ballroom	2:35
16.	"I'll Grow Stronger (instrumental)"	The Ballroom	3:14
17.	"You Turn Me Around (instrumental)"	The Ballroom	2:45
18.	"Magic Time (instrumental)"	The Ballroom	2:51
19.	"It's a Sad World (instrumental)"	The Ballroom	3:52
20.	"Spinning, Spinning, Spinning (instrumental)"	The Ballroom	2:43
Total length:			58:32

=== Disc two: Assorted Milk & Honey ===
No.	Title	Artist	Length
1.	"I'm Not Living Here"	The Ballroom	3:23
2.	"Opus to a Friend"	The Ballroom	2:09
3.	"Believe You"	The Ballroom	3:01
4.	"The Island (original version)"	The Ballroom	2:34
5.	"5 A.M. (original version)"	The Ballroom	2:43
6.	"Karmic Dream Sequence #1 (original version)"	The Ballroom	3:48
7.	"Sun Arise"	The Ballroom	3:36
8.	"Milk and Honey"	Summer's Children	2:26
9.	"Too Young to Marry"	Summer's Children	2:09
10.	"Love's Fatal Way (instrumental)"	The Ballroom	2:56
11.	"Another Time (demo)"	Curt Boettcher	3:30
12.	"Sea of Tears (demo)"	Curt Boettcher & Dottie Holmberg	2:24
13.	"Sunshine Today (demo)"	The Ballroom	2:54
14.	"Sunshine Today (alternate instrumental version)"	Sagittarius	2:37
15.	"Keeper of the Games (demo)"	Curt Boettcher	1:52
16.	"Dancing Dandelion (demo)"	Curt Boettcher	2:16
17.	"It Won't Always Be the Same (instrumental)"	The Millennium	3:23
18.	"There Is Nothing More to Say (instrumental)"	The Millennium	2:20
19.	"To Claudia on Thursday (instrumental)"	The Millennium	2:37
20.	"Lonely Girl"	Sagittarius	2:34
Total length:			55:12

=== Disc three: The Millennium ===
No.	Title	Artist	Length
1.	"Prelude"	The Millennium	1:18
2.	"To Claudia on Thursday"	The Millennium	3:26
3.	"I Just Want to Be Your Friend"	The Millennium	2:37
4.	"5 A.M."	The Millennium	2:40
5.	"I'm With You"	The Millennium	2:36
6.	"The Island"	The Millennium	3:21
7.	"Sing to Me"	The Millennium	2:17
8.	"It's You"	The Millennium	3:21
9.	"Some Sunny Day"	The Millennium	3:24
10.	"It Won't Always Be the Same"	The Millennium	2:58
11.	"The Know It All"	The Millennium	2:41
12.	"Karmic Dream Sequence #1"	The Millennium	5:53
13.	"There Is Nothing More to Say"	The Millennium	2:28
14.	"Anthem (Begin)"	The Millennium	2:46
15.	"Blight"	The Millennium	2:57
16.	"Just About the Same"	The Millennium	2:24
17.	"It's You (single version)"	The Millennium	3:14
18.	"I Just Want to Be Your Friend (single version)"	The Millennium	2:36
19.	"5 A.M. (single version)"	The Millennium	2:44
20.	"Prelude (single version)"	The Millennium	1:20
21.	"To Claudia on Thursday (single version)"	The Millennium	3:07
22.	"There Is Nothing More to Say (single version)"	The Millennium	2:25
Total length:			1:02:33
