= There's an Innocent Face =

Studio album by Curt Boetcher
- Released: 1973
- Recorded: c. 1971 - 1973
- Studio: Buddy King Home Studios
- Genre: Sunshine pop
- Length: 31:58
- Label: Elektra
- Producer: Curt Boettcher, Gary Usher, and Web Burrell

Curt Boetcher chronology
There's an Innocent Face (1973)	Chicken Little was Right (2004)

Professional ratings
Review scores
Source	Rating
AllMusic	4/5 stars

There's an Innocent Face, released in 1973, is the only solo album that American musician Curt Boettcher completed during his life. He was assisted throughout the recording by a young multi-instrumentalist, Web Burrell. Boettcher (spelt "Boetcher" on the record) was somewhat enamored by the early Emitt Rhodes solo albums, and wanted to make the album in a similar fashion. He used only a few musicians on the record, as opposed to his 1960s productions. It stands in direct contrast to most of his work because it relies almost exclusively on outside songwriting.

It has been reissued on CD by Sundazed Music.

== Track listing ==
Side one
No.	Title	Writers	Length
1.	"I Love You More Each Day"	Web Burrell, Curt Boettcher, Don Gere	2:36
2.	"Such a Lady"	Constantine Gusias, Randy Naylor	2:03
3.	"She'll Stay with You"	Don Gere	2:19
4.	"Love You Yes I Do"	Jerry Netkin, Curt Boettcher, Web Burrell	3:14
5.	"Without Her"	Constantine Gusias	1:23
6.	"Bobby California"	Don Gere	4:34

Side two
No.	Title	Writers	Length
1.	"The Choice Is Yours"	Mickey Rooney Jr., Tim Rooney	2:08
2.	"Malachi Star"	Judi Pulver, Waddy Wachtel	2:44
3.	"Lay Down"	Don Gere	3:21
4.	"I've Been Wrong"	Don Gere	3:34
5.	"Wufferton Frog"	Jerry Netkin	4:02
Total length:			31:58

== Personnel ==
- Curt Boettcher - vocals, guitar
- Web Burrell - vocals, guitar, drums
- Red Rhodes - steel guitar
- Skip Konte - keyboards
- Les Thornton - tuba on "I Love You More Each Day"
- Willis Masonheimer - tuba on "I Love You More Each Day" and "Wufferton Frog"
- Ric DeLong, Web Burrell - bass
- Wayne Yentis - ARP synthesizer
- Production: Gary Usher, Curt Boettcher, Web Burrell
