= Los Íberos =

1960s Spanish rock band

- Origin: Málaga, España
- Genres: Rock
- Years active: 1965–1969
- Labels: Decca; London
- Members: Enrique Lozano; Adolfo Rodriguez; Cristo de Haro;Watts; Diego Cascado
- Past members: Jose Castillo; Enrique Santana
- Website: losiberos60.com

Los Íberos was a pop music group founded by Enrique Lozano (Málaga 1940–2016) famous for its live shows; appearances on Escala Hi-Fi, a Spanish television show; and for having recorded an LP in London at Chapell and Decca Studios under Columbia Records. Popular songs included Summertime girl, Las tres de la Noche, Hiding behind my smile and Corto y ancho.

The band's career began in Torremolinos and reached its peak with Columbia Records after a concert in Caravelle. They recorded a single album, Los Iberos, in 1969 for Columbia, but they left many other songs.

They appeared in films such as Un, dos, tres… Al escondite inglés from Ivan Zulueta and Topycal Spanish from Lluis Bassat (the latter was censored by the government).

An accident where the van driver died and Lozano suffered head injuries had lifelong physical and psychological effects and cut short the evolution of the band. Subsequently, Lozano's wife returned to her home country, the United States, and his daughter died there in a traffic accident at age 16. Lozano then plunged into a severe depression. The band did not survive after Lozano definitively left the band.

Filmed material of the band from Television Española was lost when one of its buildings caught fire.

Lozano died on January 3, 2017.

== Discography ==
LP Los Íberos (Decca and Chappel Studies):

- Summertime girl (1968, Columbia)
- Hiding behind my smile (1968, Columbia)
- Corto y ancho (1968, Columbia)
- Mary Ann she (1969, Columbia)
- Why can't we be friends? (1969, Columbia)
- Back in time (1970, Columbia)
- Las tres de la Noche (1969, Columbia)
- Nighttime (1970, Columbia)
- Te alcanzaré (1970, Columbia)
- Fantastic girl (1970, Columbia)
- Amar en Silencio (1970, Columbia)
- Liar, Liar (1969, Columbia)

== Sources ==
=== References in English ===
- http://www.tonywaddington.com/biography
- Los Íberos discography at Discogs
- http://teamrock.com/artist-directory/l/los-iberos?id=2hzgiIPGj7TliTPjh1Y1xY
- http://www.marmalade-skies.co.uk/sfa20.htm
- https://digradio.org/2014/08/01/spin-it-life-n-soul-peacefully-asleep/

=== References in Spanish ===
- https://www.abc.es/cultura/musica/abci-muere-enrique-lozano-lider-grupo-iberos-201701032150_noticia.html
- https://www.diariosur.es/culturas/musica/201701/04/fallece-enrique-lozano-lider-20170103232728.html
- http://www.efeeme.com/tag/los-iberos/
- http://www.guateque.net/iberos.htm
- Revista EFE EME, cuaderno 1, págs 118–135, César Campoy.
- Una historia del pop malagueño, Javier Ojeda.
- Gámez, Carles (1997). Cuando todo era ye-yé. Editorial Midons. ISBN 8489240396.
- Irles, Gerardo (1997). Sólo para fans. La música yeyé y pop española de los años 60. Alianza Editorial. ISBN 8420694304.
- Vico, Darío (2004). «Los Íberos – Todas sus grabaciones (1967–1973)». Rama Lama Music.
- Ordovás, Jesús (1987). Historia de la Música Pop española. Alianza Editorial. ISBN 8420602248.
- Varios autores (1992). La música de tu vida. 30 años de pop español. Planeta Agostini.
- José Mª Íñigo, Jesús Torbado (1973). Enciclopedia de la música pop española. Mundo Joven.
- Casas, Angel (1972). 45 revoluciones en España. Dopesa.
