= Lee Mallory =

American singer-songwriter and guitarist (1945–2005)

William George "Lee" Mallory (January 10, 1945 – March 21, 2005) was a singer, songwriter and guitarist who was part of bands including The Millennium and Sagittarius. His most successful single was a cover of the Phil Ochs/Bob Gibson song "That's the Way It's Gonna Be". The song, produced by Curt Boettcher, reached No. 86 on the charts and was a surprise hit in Seattle. A CD by the same name was released in 2002, with many songs and demos Mallory had recorded during the 1960s. Lee Mallory helped start the California Sound of the 1960s.

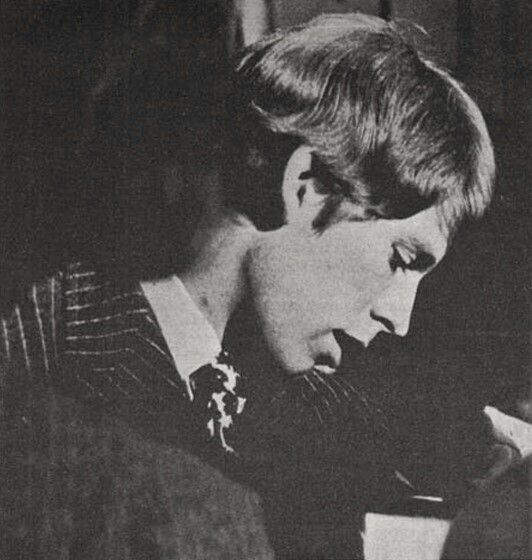
Mallory in late 1966

== Biography ==
=== Early life ===
Mallory was born in Berkeley, California on January 10, 1945. He received his first guitar at 15, and ran away from home to become a musician the following year.

=== 1960s ===
Mallory began performing for live audiences in San Francisco's North Beach cafes, such as the Coffee Gallery and Coffee and Confusion. In 1963, he went to New York and played in West Village folk clubs, including the Cafe Bizarre, the Night Owl, Cafe Wha? and the Four Winds. He later became a regular at the Troubadour in Los Angeles, where he was part of the group named The Men, some of whose members later formed The Association. As a performing musician in Los Angeles, he shared the bill with performers such as the Nitty Gritty Dirt Band.

Mallory's first recording session was as a background vocalist on Tommy Roe's "Hooray for Hazel". He became a session guitar player on several singles by The Association, and co-wrote two songs they recorded, "Better Times" and "Just About the Same".

Mallory's 1966 single on Valiant Records, a version of "That's the Way It's Gonna Be" by Phil Ochs and Bob Gibson, reached #1 in Amsterdam and #2 in Seattle. It was re-released on the Rhino Records compilation Hallucinations. "Take My Hand," his second single, is included in Rhino's compilation Come to the Sunshine. He recorded first with Valiant, then Columbia Records. His early works have been re-released on Sonic Past Music. He published with Opryland, Acuff-Rose and finally Sony/ATV before becoming an independent artist/songwriter/guitarist. Mallory's newer works have been published by Redwood River Music.

The sunshine pop supergroup The Millennium formed from members of Mallory's backup band (Jerry Scheff, Ben Benay and Toxie French). According to Mallory, Scheff coined the name to signify "a thousand years of peace and prosperity". Curt Boettcher joined as the group's producer as well as a member.

Mallory performed as lead guitarist and a member of the Tribe for the first road company of the stage production of Hair. He is the only person known to have served both in the Tribe and in the band.

In the early 1970s, Lee Mallory formed a supergroup named Hollywood with the songwriter Bill Martin and Russ Giguere, a former member of the Association.

=== Later life ===
During some lean years from 1984 to 1995, Mallory worked as a San Francisco bike messenger. As the oldest bike messenger, he was elected to serve as president of HANX.

In the 1990s, Mallory developed a distinctive 12-string guitar style. In 2000, he toured Japan with Joey Stec of Sonic Past Music, a long-time friend and co-writer from The Millennium. In Japan, he was awarded a Master Musician sash.

Mallory was a regular performer at The Cannery for many years. During the last seven years of his life, he performed and recorded with friends in the San Francisco Bay Area, including Jeseppi Trade Wildfeather, with whom he organized The Picnic, a one-day musical festival at San Francisco's Crissy Field in August 2002.

For 40 years, earnings from his publishing and recorded albums were debited against production and publishing advances. The original Millennium album consisting of 16-track songs created on three tape recorders pieced together by union engineers, cost $100,000 to produce, and the Columbia label did not commit the resources to promote it. Combined with the fact that The Millennium was not a touring band, this limited their exposure at the time. The back catalogue of The Millennium received renewed interest in the late 1990s. San Francisco State University's Lee Mallory Scholarship supports Music and Recording Industry (MRI) learning the business side of music.

The San Francisco Board of Supervisors proclaimed January 10, 2005 as the first Lee Mallory Day, honoring him and all singer-songwriters.

On Friday, March 18, 2005, Mallory completed a small set of mixes for his final album, produced by Alex James Muscat at Last Stop Records. This was his first studio work in decades, and the first in which he had complete creative control after 40 years of recording and playing with first-call studio musicians on approximately 35 albums. The album's release is currently on hold.

Many Are the Times, a comprehensive review of Mallory's work over time, was re-released by Sonic Past Music in 2006. This includes expanded liner notes and archival photographs.

Mallory became active raising awareness of Hepatitis C. Lee Mallory died at the University of California, San Francisco Emergency Department on March 21, 2005, from liver cancer.
