= Curt Boettcher =

American singer-songwriter

- Boettcher in the 1960s

Background information
- Also known as: Curt Boetcher, Curt Becher
- Born: Curtis Roy Boettcher; January 7, 1944
- Origin: Eau Claire, Wisconsin, United States
- Died: June 14, 1987 (aged 43) Los Angeles, California, United States
- Genres: Pop, rock, folk, country, sunshine pop
- Occupations: Record producer, songwriter, musician, arranger
- Years active: 1964–1983
- Labels: Epic, Valiant, Warner Bros., Columbia, Elektra, Boardwalk
- Formerly of: The GoldeBriars; The Millennium; Sagittarius
- Website: link

Curtis Roy Boettcher (January 7, 1944 – June 14, 1987), sometimes credited as Curt Boetcher or Curt Becher, was an American singer, songwriter, arranger, musician, and record producer from Wisconsin. He was a pivotal figure in what is now termed "sunshine pop", working with the Association, the Millennium, Sagittarius, Paul Revere and the Raiders, Tommy Roe, Bobby Jameson, Elton John, Gene Clark, Emitt Rhodes, Tandyn Almer, the Beach Boys, and others.

The New York Times wrote of Boettcher: "If his life had gone just a bit differently, [he] might have been another Brian Wilson. ... As it stands, Boettcher — a pop-music producer whose heyday was the late '60s — now survives in rock history mostly as a liner-note credit. He could have been, but never was. Yet he enjoys a godlike status among a select group of music fans, for whom obscurity is more enticing than fame."

== Early life ==
He was born in Eau Claire, Wisconsin, to Peggie and Arland Boettcher. His father was a Navy pilot in World War II and later worked at the Pentagon.

== The GoldeBriars ==
Boettcher entered the University of Minnesota in fall 1962, where in 1963 he formed the folk quartet The GoldeBriars with the Holmberg sisters, Dotti and Sheri, and Ron Neilsson. They relocated to Los Angeles after being signed by Epic Records, for whom they recorded and released two albums in 1964, The GoldeBriars and Straight Ahead! (A third was reportedly recorded in 1965 but withheld from release.) Under the guidance of recording producer Bob Morgan, the vocals were mixed upfront and enriched by double-tracking to sound like six voices. Prior to recording their third album, the group added drummer Ron Edgar (later of The Music Machine; Edgar also worked with Boettcher in the bands The Ballroom and The Millennium). According to music historian Joseph Lanza, the GoldeBriars' material tended to follow the standard folk formula of songs such as "Shenandoah", but "acoustically, their style blended the homespun and the sugarspun." Boettcher arranged most of the group's songs, but he also contributed as a songwriter. Morgan, quoted in Lanza's Vanilla Pop, said that Boettcher's childhood as a navy brat influenced songs like "Haiku" on the album Straight Ahead!. Bobb Goldsteinn, an accomplished songwriter (who wrote the 1963 folk-dixie hit "Washington Square" for the Village Stompers), became "Boettcher's manager [and] confidant[e]", as well as lyricist for some GoldeBriars songs. As manager, Goldsteinn inched the band in a more pop-flavored direction. The GoldeBriars performed live in the 1965 film Once Upon a Coffee House.

== The Association, The Ballroom, and Tommy Roe ==
Following the demise of The GoldeBriars, Boettcher moved into production and songwriting work for others, including Lee Mallory and The Association. In 1966, through his production partnership Our Productions, Boettcher produced the debut album by The Association, And Then... Along Comes the Association, released on Valiant Records. The album spawned two Top 10 hits, "Along Comes Mary" (which reached #7 in the U.S.) and "Cherish" (which reached #1). In 2012, original Association member Jim Yester said Valiant Records claimed "Cherish" sounded "too old and archaic", but the song's success "just showed we can have archaic and eat it, too." The album included the song "Message of Our Love", co-written by Boettcher and Tandyn Almer (who also wrote "Along Comes Mary").

Boettcher's wife Claudia said that Almer wrote "Along Comes Mary" as a slow song. Boettcher sped up the tempo and recorded a demo on which he sang the vocal. This demo was presented to The Association, who used it as a guide for their arrangement of the tune. It was the band's attempt to replicate and build on Boettcher's demo that became the group's first hit single (produced by Boettcher). Boettcher and Almer had a dispute over writing credits for the song, Boettcher arguing that his extensive contributions to the arrangement, which formed the basis of the hit version of the song, warranted a co-writer credit. However, the song was ultimately credited solely to Almer.

After the album achieved commercial success, according to a November 1966 story in Billboard, the band dropped their manager, Dean Fredericks, who in turn filed a breach of contract suit against the band, claiming they were bound by a seven-year agreement. After filing suit, Fredericks joined Our Productions. "Consequently," Billboard revealed, "[the] Association will no longer associate with Our Productions, and henceforth will be a&r'd [sic] by Jerry Yester, brother of Association member Jim Yester." As a result of this dispute, despite his valuable contributions to the debut album's commercial breakthrough, Boettcher was prevented from continuing as the band's producer. (He produced several tracks for a later incarnation of the band in the early 1980s.)

In a 1974 interview with ZigZag Magazine, Boettcher said that during this period he was under contract to Our Productions and on salary. This arrangement accorded him no royalties, but a tremendous amount of artistic freedom. "I wanted to keep on working, to be there. I think for a while I had more hours [of studio experience] for any producer my age. I used to practically live in the studio. And I used to work until I fell over. It was like an addiction.

In 1966 he formed the group The Ballroom with Sandy Salisbury, Michele O'Malley, and Jim Bell. The quartet recorded an album's worth of material, but other than two songs on a 1967 Warner Bros. 45 rpm single, the sessions remained unreleased until 2001.

In 1966, he produced two hit singles for Tommy Roe, "Sweet Pea" and "Hooray for Hazel". Production on both was credited to Boettcher's Our Productions partner, Steve Clark, but Boettcher subsequently claimed that he himself produced these recordings. The following year, Boettcher produced Roe's album It's Now Winter's Day (ABC Records).

== The Millennium and Sagittarius ==
Boettcher is said to have met both producer Gary Usher and Beach Boy songwriter Brian Wilson while producing and mixing the first single by Lee Mallory, "That's the Way It's Gonna Be", issued on Valiant Records in 1966. Usher in later years insisted that Boettcher influenced Brian Wilson during the development of the Beach Boys' perennial album Pet Sounds (1966), leading him to "abandon surfing music."

Usher bought Boettcher's contract and signed him as a staff producer for Columbia Records. In 1967 he enlisted Boettcher to collaborate on a personal project, a studio band called Sagittarius, under whose name he had produced a single, "My World Fell Down", which became a minor hit. (It was sung by Glen Campbell, who at the time was working as a session musician in Los Angeles, with Bruce Johnston of the Beach Boys on backing vocals.) Because of the modest chart success of the single, Columbia requested a full album, only to discover there was no group. Usher and Boettcher became the studio group, and an album was completed and released in 1968 under the title Present Tense. (Usher and Boettcher are pictured on the cover.) Some of the songs were adapted from the unreleased Ballroom sessions, while others were re-recorded with new arrangements. The single version of "My World Fell Down" was edited differently on the album, omitting a bridge of musique concrète that was on the 45. A second single, "Hotel Indiscreet", recorded with Boettcher (and featuring a comedic non sequitur by the Firesign Theater), was released, but it failed to chart. The album was a commercial failure.

Usher's celebrity, as well as Boettcher's successful productions for The Association and Tommy Roe, convinced Columbia to finance Boettcher's own studio project. In 1967 he assembled a group of musicians and songwriters with whom he had previously worked or personally knew (including Sandy Salisbury, Lee Mallory, Joey Stec, and Michael Fennelly), as well as some top Los Angeles session musicians, and started recording an album under the group moniker The Millennium. The album was co-produced by Keith Olsen, who had been a friend of Boettcher since his college days. Their debut—and only—album, Begin, was the most expensive album ever recorded for Columbia at that point. Despite the release of several singles, sales were dismal and the project was considered a commercial flop. This was partially attributable to Boettcher's reluctance to tour. The group staged a few live performances in Los Angeles, but the difficulty of replicating the album in concert posed a large enough challenge to dissuade Boettcher from sustaining the band. Although the single "It's You" became a hit in several regions, there was no group to support it. "5 AM" also charted in the Philippines. The group recorded one final single, "Just About The Same" b/w "Blight", which was not issued at the time. Despite its commercial failure, the album is critically regarded as one of the finest pop albums from the late 1960s, and has been described at AllMusic as a "bona fide lost classic". In 2000 an album of demos by The Millennium called Again was issued.

Soon after The Millennium broke up, Boettcher's friend Gary Usher, fired by Columbia Records, started a record label called Together Records. He brought in Boettcher and Olsen as staff producers, and Boettcher was involved in several projects for the label. These included his first attempt at a solo album, as well as producing recordings for a Sandy Salisbury solo album, contributing to the second Sagittarius album, and co-producing with Olsen The Moses Lake Recordings by The Bards, which was a mixture of garage rock with psychedelia and sunshine pop elements. Although the second Sagittarius album, The Blue Marble, did see release (and also notched a minor entry on the singles chart with a cover of The Beach Boys' "In My Room", sung by Boettcher), and several Sandy Salisbury singles were released, the label failed before any of Boettcher's other work could be completed. (Some Boettcher projects for Together were released in the early 2000s). Among other Boettcher productions remaining unreleased are sessions for Twice Nicely, guitarist Waddy Wachtel and singer Judy Pulver (co-writers of "Malachi Star", a song on Boettcher's 1973 solo album), a single for (My Three Sons actor) Don Grady of the band Yellow Balloon, and sessions produced with Gary Usher of a guitar duo called Tom and Dick. (Dick was songwriter David Batteau, who would later write songs with and for Boettcher in the band California.) Former Millennium bandmate Ron Edgar played drums on the Tom and Dick sessions. In 1970 Boettcher and Olsen served as mixdown engineers for Emitt Rhodes' first Dunhill album.

== Solo recording and The Beach Boys ==
In the early 1970s, Boettcher had little commercial success and few rewarding recording projects. In 1971, at the insistence of Elektra Records founder-president Jac Holzman, who was a huge fan of Begin, Boettcher signed a deal with Elektra. He warned Holzman that the album would take a long time to produce, and started working on a solo album. The project got a boost when Boettcher met a young multi-instrumentalist named Web Burrell; taking a cue from the early one-man albums by Rhodes, Boettcher decided to record the album in a similar fashion, using few musicians other than Burrell. (Boettcher and Burrell collaborated on at least three published songs.) After almost two years of work, There's An Innocent Face was released in 1973 under the name Curt Boetcher. It was a continuation of the direction that the Millennium had taken with their unreleased post-Begin recordings, being a collection of songs with country, sunshine pop, arena rock, and folk stylings. The album was a commercial failure. He attempted to record a follow-up album, tentatively titled Chicken Little Was Right, but it was never completed.

In the mid-1970s, Boettcher sang backing vocals on a number of Elton John recordings, including "Don't Go Breaking My Heart", a duet John recorded with Kiki Dee. He also contributed backing vocals to recordings by Tanya Tucker, Helen Reddy, Eric Carmen.

Thereafter, his output as a musician and producer was limited and sporadic. Beginning in 1975, he worked for several years as a disco DJ throughout southern California. His best-known work in the late 1970s was a 10-minute disco version of "Here Comes the Night" by The Beach Boys, which was a moderate hit in 1979 and was included on L.A. (Light Album); it was a remake of the original recording from their 1967 album Wild Honey. As Curt Becher he produced a version of "Shortnin' Bread" for The Beach Boys that emerged on some bootleg collections. He also produced Mike Love's solo album Looking Back With Love. Other productions were largely overlooked, such as the Geno Washington album That's Why Hollywood Loves Me and The Diamonds' Live And Well album. In 1980 he produced new recordings by a later incarnation of The Association, but these tracks were not released. He also produced their 1983 version of "Walk Away Renee," which was included on a Radio Shack promotional album by Mike Love and Dean Torrence entitled Rock & Roll City.

== Personal life and death ==
Little is known about Boettcher's personal life. He married Claudia Ford in the late 1960s, and they had a son, Varek, before they were divorced. A 2013 New York Times Magazine article asserted that Boettcher was gay, and that he tested positive for HIV in the 1980s.

Boettcher died in June 1987 at Los Angeles County Hospital while being treated for a lung infection. His former wife claimed that a blood vessel was clipped in his lung during a biopsy, and the medical staff, fearful of his HIV-positive status, avoided Boettcher while he bled out. Shortly before his death, he set up the Valley Center Studios with musician Mark Antaky and engineer Dave Jenkins.

== Cover versions ==
The Brady Bunch recorded Boettcher's composition "I Just Want To Be Your Friend" for their 1972 album, Meet the Brady Bunch (Paramount Records). Another Boettcher co-composition, "There Is Nothing More to Say", was sung as a solo by Maureen McCormick on Chris Knight & Maureen McCormick, a 1973 album by Brady cast members McCormick and Christopher Knight. The song was reissued as a bonus track on the CD release of The Brady Bunch Phonographic Album.

The Sunshine Company, a Los Angeles rock band, recorded two Boettcher compositions, "I Just Want To Be Your Friend" (on the 1967 album Happy Is the Sunshine Company, Imperial Records 12359), and "If You Only Knew" (on the 1968 album The Sunshine Company, Imperial Records 12368).

The Hep Stars, a 1960s Swedish rock group whose line-up included Benny Andersson before he went on to greater fame in ABBA, recorded four Boettcher compositions, "Another Time", "Musty Dusty" (co-written with Tandyn Almer), "Would You Like To Go" (co-written with Jules "Gary" Alexander of the Association), and "Spinning Spinning Spinning" (co-written with Ruthann Friedman).

Eternity's Children covered a Boettcher composition, "You Know I've Found a Way" on their 1968 album of the same name. A further cover of the song included Sagittarius, who included it on their album, Present Tense.

In April 2013, Beth Sorrentino (formerly of the American rock band Suddenly, Tammy!) released Would You Like To Go: A Curt Boettcher Songbook, produced by Sean Slade and issued in Europe on the Basta label. (It was released in North America on June 10, 2014.) The album includes covers of well-known and obscure Boettcher songs and co-writes, as well as an idiosyncratic recording of "Along Comes Mary" because of the song's strong association with Boettcher. Sorrentino's recording of "You Know I've Found a Way" (co-written by Boettcher and Lee Mallory) was used as the soundtrack for the trailer of Rik Cordero's film Starla.

== Discography ==
As Artist:

- The GoldeBriars - The GoldeBriars (1964, Epic)
- The GoldeBriars - Straight Ahead! (1964, Epic)
- The Ballroom - Preparing for the Millennium (1998, Creation)
- The Millennium - Begin (1968, Columbia)
- Sagittarius - Present Tense (1968, Columbia)
- Sagittarius - The Blue Marble (1969, Together)
- Curt Boetcher [sic] - There's an Innocent Face (1973, Elektra)
- Curt Boettcher - Chicken Little Was Right (2004, Rev-Ola)
- Sandy Salisbury & Curt Boettcher - Try For The Sun (2023)
- Curt Boettcher - Passionfruit (2024)

As Producer:

- Jacobson & Tansley - "Dream With Me"/"I Knew You Back When Babe" (1966, Filmways, Capitol)
- The Association - And Then... Along Comes the Association (1966, Valiant)
- Tommy Roe - It's Now Winter's Day (1967, ABC)
- Jameson - Color Him In (1967, Verve)
- Eternity's Children - Eternity's Children (1968, Tower)
- The Millennium - Begin (1968, Columbia)
- Sagittarius - Present Tense (1968, Columbia)
- Sandy Salisbury - Sandy (1969)
- The Bards - The Moses Lake Recordings (1969 Together Records)
- Song - Album (1971, MGM)
- Sailor - Checkpoint (1977, Epic; co-produced by Bruce Johnston)
- The Beach Boys - "Here Comes the Night" (extended remix), on L.A. (Light Album) (1979, Brother/Caribou/CBS)
- Geno Washington - That's Why Hollywood Loves Me (1979, DJM)
- Mike Love - Looking Back with Love (1981, Boardwalk)
- The Diamonds - Live and Well (1983)
- Various Artists: Looking for the Sun: The Lost Productions of Curt Boettcher and Friends (2019, High Moon Records)
- The Bards - The Moses Lake Recordings, (2002 GearFab records - produced in 1970 for Together Records)

Appears on:

- Your Gang - Your Gang (1966, Mercury)
- Friar Tuck - Friar Tuck and his Psychedelic Guitar (1967, Mercury)
- Chad & Jeremy - Of Cabbages and Kings (1967, Columbia)
- Chad & Jeremy - The Ark (1968, Columbia)
- The Byrds - The Notorious Byrd Brothers (1968, Columbia)
- Paul Revere & the Raiders - Hard 'N' Heavy (With Marshmallow) (1969, Columbia)
- Michele - Saturn Rings (1969, Mercury)
- Emitt Rhodes - Emitt Rhodes (1970, Dunhill)
- Emitt Rhodes - Farewell to Paradise (1973, Dunhill)
- Andy Goldmark - Andy Goldmark (1973, Warner)
- Elton John - Blue Moves (1976, MCA)
- Bob Crewe - Motivation (1977, Elektra)
- Eric Carmen - Boats Against the Current (1977, Arista)
- Helen Reddy - Ear Candy (1977, Capitol)
- Bruce Johnston - Going Public (1977, Columbia)
- Dennis Wilson - Pacific Ocean Blue (1977, CBS/Caribou)
- Tanya Tucker - TNT (1978, MCA)
- Tony Sciuto - Island Nights (1980, Epic)
