= Eternity's Children =

American sunshine pop band

- Also known as: The Phantoms
- Origin: Cleveland, Mississippi, United States
- Genres: Sunshine pop; folk rock; psychedelic pop
- Years active: 1965–1974
- Labels: A&M; Tower; Capitol
- Spinoffs: Starbuck
- Past members: Bruce Blackman; Roy Whittaker; Charlie Ross; Jerry Bounds; Johnny Walker; Linda Lawley; Mike McClain; Bo Wagner

Eternity's Children was an American sunshine pop band that originated in Cleveland, Mississippi, as a folk group known as the Phantoms. The Phantoms began with two students, composed of vocalist/keyboardist Bruce Blackman and drummer Roy Whittaker. Soon, the group added lead guitarist Johnny Walker, rhythm guitarist Jerry Bounds, and bassist Charlie Ross, and began developing the complex, overlapping vocal harmonies that were utilized when they became Eternity's Children in 1967. Their one and only hit, "Mrs. Bluebird", reached number 69 on the Billboard Hot 100 and number 58 in Canada.

== History ==
=== Beginnings ===
In 1965, Bruce Blackman and Roy Whittaker, students of Delta College, founded The Phantoms, and added fellow students Jerry Bounds, Charlie Ross, and Johnny Walker. The band played locally within the college and gained a sizable local following. They released a single titled "Workin' Tired" b/w "Gonna Be Nice Tonight" on the local Flash label before relocating to Biloxi, Mississippi, in 1966. Here, in Biloxi, the group became a house band in a basement nightclub of the Biloxi Hotel. The band, when they were not the lead performance, would back musicians like Charlie Rich and B.J. Thomas. In the same year, the band added folk singer Linda Lawley (April 18, 1949 – November 24, 2007) and changed their name to Eternity's Children. Another single, both songs composed by Blackman, titled "Can't Put A Thing Over Me" b/w "Time and Place" was released on another local label called Apollo. However, the single made little impact outside their local following.

=== Major label ===
As 1966 turned to 1967, the band recorded a demo after the manager of a club in Baton Rouge named Ray Roy watched one of their live performances. Roy convinced his business partner Guy Belello to sign the group to a recording contract and become their manager. Eternity's Children's quickly recorded a demo that made its way to A&M Records manager, Allen Stanton. In the spring of 1967, the group (relocated to Los Angeles) released their one and only single for the label called "Wait and See". It was produced by former Music Machine bassist Keith Olsen. The record flopped and, despite successful touring in which the band opened for bands like Strawberry Alarm Clock and The Blues Magoos, they were dropped from the A&M label.

Despite not obtaining a hit single, the group did attract attention from Capitol Records, who signed them to a contract. Under the label's Tower subsidiary the band, with production by Keith Olsen and Curt Boettcher, released their most successful single, "Mrs. Bluebird" b/w "Little Boy". "Mrs. Bluebird" became a modest hit despite the limited promotion, and was a prime example of the group's vocal harmonies. An appearance on American Bandstand propelled the group to the national pop charts, where "Mrs. Bluebird" reached #69 on the Billboard Hot 100 and #54 on the Cash Box Top 100 in August 1968, but success would be short-lived as the single dropped off the charts after three weeks. Its followup, "Sunshine Among Us", was less successful, peaking at #117 on the Billboard Bubbling Under chart in September of the same year.

During work on Eternity's Children's debut studio album, managerial and musical indifference caused Blackman, Bounds, and Walker to exit from band activity. Blackman, regarding the tension, stated "We did not survive because of incredibly bad management...After I left the group they tried to cheat me of any credit". Only keyboardist Mike "Kid" McClain would be included as a replacement and the remaining members of Ross, Whittaker, and Lawley would continue to record the album. Eternity's Children would be released in 1968 and became a local interest in Los Angeles for its style set in psychedelic pop and sunshine pop, but failed to chart nationally. Producers Olsen and Boettcher utilized studio musicians so it is difficult to definitively depict who is playing on a given track.

=== Second LP and later happenings ===
Despite the disappointment of the group's debut album, Eternity's Children reconvened with a new producer, Gary Paxton. Bruce Blackman (the main songwriter of their past album) left the band before recording began, leaving Ross, Lawley, and McClain to contribute to the all-original material for the album. Percussionist Bo Wagner replaced Whittaker and took part in the 1969 single "Till I Hear It From You" b/w "I Wanna Be With You". When the single did not chart, Capitol Records withdrew the American release of their second album, Timeless. It did receive a limited release in Canada, however, where "Mrs. Bluebird" was most successful. But with the high asking price, not many fans of the band bought the album, and it has since become a difficult item to find.

With the botched second album, the remaining members of Eternity's Children moved to Memphis, Tennessee and were matched with a different producer, Chips Moman, to produce a third album. That album never materialized, but the group continued to release more singles on the Capitol label throughout 1969. When Capitol cut business relations with the group, they moved to independent labels back in Mississippi the following year to record more singles. Those met with little success, however, and Eternity's Children disbanded, while variations of the group continued to tour until 1974.

Wagner, Blackman, and Walker went on to be a part of the band Starbuck, achieving a number three hit in the spring and summer of 1976 with their debut single, "Moonlight Feels Right".

On September 30, 2003, a compilation album titled The Lost Sessions was released, and included rare recorded material of the band from the 1960s to their early 1970s material.

Johnny Walker reportedly died in 2007 at age 56 (date and cause of death are unknown).

Linda Lawley Pelfrey (born in Stillwater, Oklahoma) died of cancer on November 24, 2007, at age 58, in Woodland Hills, Los Angeles, California.

== Discography ==
=== Singles ===
- "Can't Put A Thing Over Me" / "Time and Place"-Apollo 101, May 1967
- "Wait and See" / "Rumors"—A&M 866, August 1967
- "Mrs. Bluebird" / "Little Boy"—Tower 416, May 1968 (Billboard #69, Cash Box #54, RPM #58)
- "Sunshine Among Us" / "Rupert White"—Tower 439, August 1968 (Billboard #117)
- "Till I Hear It from You" / "I Wanna Be with You"—Tower 449, November 1968
- "The Sidewalks of the Ghetto" / "Look Away"—Tower 476, May 1969
- "A Railroad Trestle in California" / "My Happiness Day"—Tower 477, May 1969
  (Charles Ross III solo single; B-side is the same recording as by Eternity's Children from the self-titled album)
- "Blue Horizon" / "Lifetime Day"—Tower 498, August 1969
- "Laughing Girl" / "Little Boy"—Tower 499, August 1969
  (Charles Ross III solo single; B-side is the same recording as by Eternity's Children from the self-titled album)
- "Alone Again" / "From You Unto Us"—Liberty 56162, March 1970

=== Albums ===
- Eternity's Children (Tower T-5123 [Mono], and ST-5123 [Stereo], April 15, 1968)
- Timeless (Tower ST-5144 [U.S., cancelled], Capitol Records of Canada ST-6302, 1969)
- Eternity's Children 2 LPs plus bonus tracks on 1 CD (Rev-Ola Records, 1999)
- The Lost Sessions (Gear Fab Records, 2003)
- From Us Unto You: The Original Singles CD compilation (Rev-Ola Records, 2005)
- Eternity's Children Mono/Stereo CD reissue (Rev-Ola Records, 2005)
- Timeless Stereo CD reissue (Rev-Ola Records, 2005)
