= The Sunshine Company =

US musical group

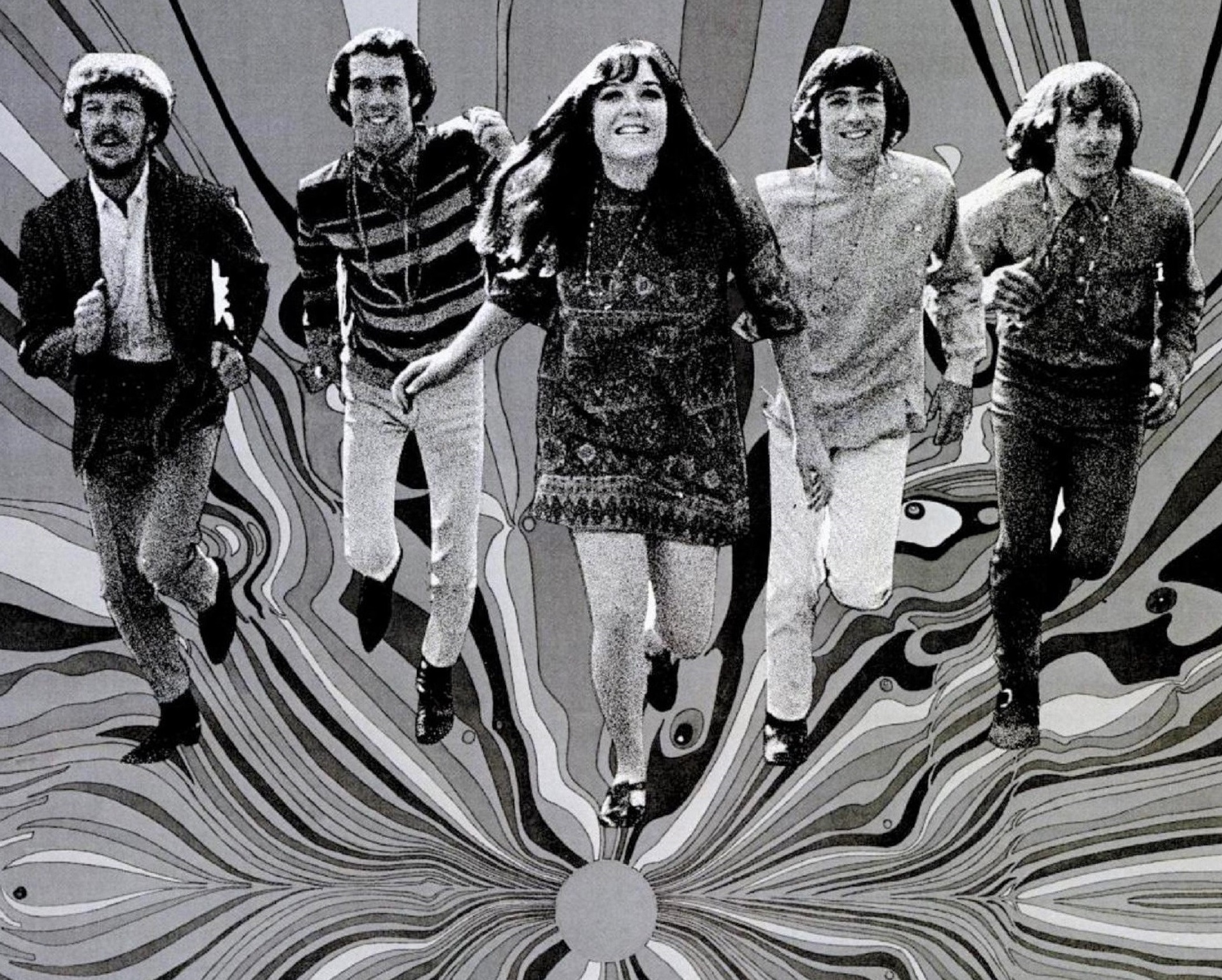
- The Sunshine Company in 1967

Background information
- Origin: Los Angeles, California, United States
- Genres: Sunshine pop
- Years active: 1967–1968
- Labels: Imperial Records
- Past members: Mary Nance; Maury Manseau; Larry Sims; Merel Bregante; Douglas Mark; Dave Hodgkins

The Sunshine Company was an American sunshine pop band from Los Angeles, California. Originally the duo of Mary Nance (November 7, 1947 – November 24, 2019) and Maury Manseau, the group later added the rhythm section of bassist Larry Sims and drummer Merel Bregante and signed to Imperial Records, releasing their debut album in 1967. They scored three hit singles on the U.S. singles chart over the next two years before disbanding after their third album, 1968's self-titled effort. Sims and Bregante later backed Loggins and Messina.

== History ==
The group was discovered by the manager of the Nitty Gritty Dirt Band, Bill McEuen. McEuen proposed they record a single, titled Up, Up and Away, which would have been released had not the 5th Dimension released their own top ten version. Their first single, "Happy", charted at number 50 nationally, while competing with another version by the Blades of Grass (which had less chart success). Guitarist Douglas Mark then joined to form a quintet as the band released their biggest hit, "Back On the Street Again" (#36 on Billboard), but the band never again achieved such success.

By the fall of 1967, the band released their debut LP on Imperial Records, titled Happy Is The Sunshine Company. It included their two charting singles and peaked at number 126 on the Billboard 200. In 1968, the group released their last top 100 charting single, "Look Here Comes The Sun", peaking at number 56. A further two albums were released in the same year but success eluded the band. There was a proposed fourth album, Think, but the Sunshine Company broke up before recordings were complete.

As of 2015, Bregante lives in Liberty Hill, Texas, where he has his own recording studio. Sims died in December 2014.

Nance, born in Champaign, Illinois, resided in San Pedro, California in her later years. She died on November 24, 2019, at the age of 72.

== Members ==
- Mary Nance - vocals (died 2019)
- Maury Manseau - vocals, guitar
- Larry Sims - bass guitar (died 2014)
- Merel Bregante - drums (usually referred to as Merel Brigante)
- Douglas Mark - violin, guitar
- Dave Hodgkins - acoustic guitar (1968)

== Discography ==
=== Albums ===
- Happy Is the Sunshine Company (Imperial Records, 1967) U.S. #126
- The Sunshine Company (Imperial, 1968)
- Sunshine & Shadows (Imperial, 1968)

=== Charting singles ===
- "Happy" (15 July 1967) U.S. #50
- "Back on the Street Again" (25 November 1967) U.S. #36; CAN #50
- "Look, Here Comes the Sun" (10 February 1968) U.S. #56; CAN #43
- "Let's Get Together" (18 May 1968) U.S. #112
- "On a Beautiful Day" (27 July 1968) U.S. #106
- "Willie Jean" (19 October 1968) U.S. #111
