= The Millennium (band) =

American band

- Origin: Los Angeles, California, U.S.
- Genres: Sunshine pop; baroque pop; psychedelic pop
- Years active: 1967–1968
- Labels: Columbia
- Past members: Curt Boettcher; Lee Mallory; Sandy Salisbury; Joey Stec; Michael Fennelly; Doug Rhodes; Ron Edgar

The Millennium were an American sunshine pop band formed in Los Angeles, California, in 1967.

== History ==
Boettcher had originally worked with drummer Ron Edgar for a brief time in the folk group the GoldeBriars. After The GoldeBriars dissolved, Edgar joined the group the Music Machine, which also featured Doug Rhodes on organ. The Music Machine scored a Top 20 hit with the song "Talk Talk" before disbanding. Boettcher had also formed a group called the Ballroom, which featured Sandy Salisbury as a vocalist. Lee Mallory had worked as a songwriter and solo performer, and Boettcher had produced some of his recordings, including a cover of Phil Ochs' "That's The Way It's Gonna Be". The group also featured support from session musicians such as Jerry Scheff.

The Millennium recorded one album, Begin in 1968. Before disbanding, the group recorded one follow-up single: "Just About The Same" b/w "Blight", and several tracks later released on compilation albums. Boettcher went on to make several attempts at recording solo albums (only one was released during his lifetime, There's An Innocent Face), as did Salisbury and Joey Stec. Michael Fennelly would end up in the early 1970s group Crabby Appleton, who signed with Elektra Records and released two albums, scoring a Top 40 hit with the single "Go Back".

Stec founded the record label Sonic Past Music in the late 1990s, and this label has subsequently released previously unavailable albums from the Millennium, Boettcher, Salisbury, Mallory, and Stec.

== Members ==
- Curt Boettcher – vocals, guitar, production
- Lee Mallory – vocals, guitar
- Sandy Salisbury – vocals, guitar
- Joey Stec – vocals, guitar
- Michael Fennelly – vocals, guitar
- Doug Rhodes – bass, harpsichord, piano
- Ron Edgar – drums, percussion

== Discography ==
=== Studio albums ===
- Begin (1968, Columbia Records)

=== Compilation albums ===
- The Second Millennium (2000, Dreamsville)
- The Millennium Continues (2000, Trattoria)
- Magic Time (2001, Sundazed Music)
- Voices of the Millennium (Sonic Past Music)
- Pieces (Sonic Past Music)

=== Box sets ===
- The Millennium at Last (2012, Sony Music Japan)
