= Joey Stec =

American musician (born 1947)

- Born: 1947 (age 78–79)
- Origin: Chicago, Illinois, U.S.
- Genres: Rock
- Occupations: Guitarist, vocalist, recording engineer
- Instrument: Guitar
- Label: Sonic Past Music
- Formerly of: The Millennium

Joey Stec (born 1947) is an American songwriter, singer, guitarist, producer and president of Sonic Past Music.

== Biography ==
In 1967, he became a member of the Millennium. In 1969 he joined The Blues Magoos, and formed The Dependables. In 1976, he released a solo album on Playboy Records, produced by Rolling Stones producer Jimmy Miller.

While Stec doesn't have name recognition, he worked with well-known artists.

== Career ==
=== 1960s to 1980s ===
An article about Tom Takayoshi the vice president for Playboy Records appeared in the 2 October 1976 issue of Record World. The article, "Takayoshi Sees Double Sales For Playboy" stated that Takayoshi had outlined the release of six new albums. Each of them would have their own promotion and merchandising campaign. In addition to releases by Mickey Gilley, Hamilton, Joe Frank & Dennison, Greg Kihn and Wynn Stewart and, there would be debut albums by Weapons of Peace and Joey Stec.

With Weapons of Peace adding to the r&b area and Stec adding to the rock area, the article also said that Stec's album was long awaited. It also made note of the producer Jimmy Miller who in the past had produced material for the Rolling Stones and Traffic.

=== 1990s to 2020s ===
Joey Stec founded Sonic Past Music in 2000, a record label focusing on previously unreleased work by classic rock artists.
