= Sagittarius (band) =

American pop group

Sagittarius was an American sunshine pop studio group formed in 1967, devised by record producer and songwriter Gary Usher.

== History ==
Usher had been involved with music as a songwriter since the early 1960s (including writing lyrics for some of Brian Wilson's earliest songs), and soon branched out into production work. After considerable success as a producer, he eventually became a staff producer for Columbia Records. It was at this position that, in 1967, he produced Chad & Jeremy. They had played him several songs, which he felt lacked any commercial potential. He had heard a demo around that time for a song called "My World Fell Down" (also recorded by the British pop group The Ivy League), and he played it for them, thinking that it was a sure-fire hit. They balked at the idea of covering the song, and Usher felt that he would do it himself.

He brought in Los Angeles session musicians, as well as drafting friends such as Beach Boys touring alumni Glen Campbell (who did the lead vocal on the track) and Bruce Johnston and singer-turned-producer Terry Melcher for vocals. He finished the recording by adding a musique concrète bridge. He presented it to Columbia executives under the group name Sagittarius, named after his astrological sun sign.

The single reached number 70 in the Billboard Hot 100. When there was pressure from Columbia for the group to tour, it was revealed that a group did not exist. Usher did, however, start working on an album for Columbia under the Sagittarius name. Most of this work was done in conjunction with Curt Boettcher.

Usher had met Boettcher when he was working with a group that he led and produced called The Ballroom. They were signed to Warner Bros. Records, and they recorded an album which was not released at the time. Usher, however, was impressed enough by Boettcher's talents that he utilized him as a songwriter, musician, and producer (two of the album's tracks were the same recordings made for the unreleased Ballroom album, though they appeared in stereo) throughout the album.

Prior to releasing an album, another single appeared, with the song "Hotel Indiscreet" as the A-side. The B-sides for some of the Sagittarius singles consisted of instrumentals that Usher had originally recorded for another studio project. As was the case with "My World Fell Down", the bridge featured an unrelated comedy bit by The Firesign Theatre, another Usher discovery, but unlike the previous single, it failed to chart.

In 1968, the Present Tense album was released. Because Clive Davis disliked the usage of musique concrete in the two singles, Usher removed these segments from the album versions. The album version of "My World Fell Down" featured a few bars of additional music between the first and second verses, that did not appear in the single version, and both were mixed in stereo for the album. The single "Another Time" written and sung by Curt Boettcher was released from the album and charted in some markets.

However, in 1969, Usher left his job at Columbia Records in order to start his own label, Together Records. Usher started work on another Sagittarius album, The Blue Marble, but this time, he contributed more as a musician, particularly as a vocalist. As he had done with the Byrds album The Notorious Byrd Brothers, Usher made extensive use of a Moog synthesizer throughout the record. Boettcher contributed lead vocals on two songs, "Will You Ever See Me" and a cover of the Beach Boys song "In My Room", but his involvement was otherwise minimal. "In My Room" was issued as a single and became a minor hit, peaking at number 86 on the Hot 100. However, the album failed to chart. Several more non-album singles were released by Together Records, before the end of the label.

Both Sagittarius albums have been reissued on CD, and both contain bonus tracks (including single versions of Sagittarius songs, which in some cases differ from the album versions).

== Discography ==
=== Albums ===
- 1968: Present Tense
- 1969: The Blue Marble

=== Singles ===
- 1967: "My World Fell Down" (U.S. number 70)
- 1969: "In My Room" (U.S. number 86)
- 1969: "I Guess the Lord Must Be in New York City" (U.S. number 135)
