= Sunshine pop =

Subgenre of pop music

- Other names: Soft pop; soft rock
- Stylistic origins: Pop; easy listening; folk rock; surf rock; jingles; psychedelia; California sound; progressive
- Cultural origins: Mid 1960s, California, U.S.
- Derivative forms: Shibuya-kei

Other topics
- Baroque pop; counterculture of the 1960s; bubblegum; folk-pop; recording studio as an instrument

Sunshine pop (originally called soft pop and soft rock) is a loosely defined form of pop music that was first associated with early soft rock producers and songwriters based in Los Angeles, California, during the mid- to late 1960s. Its studio-centric sound was primarily rooted in folk rock and easy listening, typically featuring rich harmony vocals and progressive elements, while lyrics combined idyllic imagery with a subtle awareness of societal change, melancholic undertones, and countercultural themes. It was among the dominating music styles heard in television, film, and commercials of the era.

Branching from the nascent California sound, the movement initially straddled multiple styles among many groups who existed briefly while adapting to evolving music trends, resulting in much crossover with bubblegum, folk-pop, garage rock, baroque pop, and psychedelia. Most groups were less successful sound-alikes of acts such as the Mamas & the Papas, led by John Phillips, and the 5th Dimension, whose songs were initially helmed by Jimmy Webb. Curt Boettcher produced numerous key records for the Association, Eternity's Children, his band the Millennium, and with collaborator Gary Usher (Sagittarius). Though the Beach Boys rarely approached the style, Brian Wilson's production of their 1966 album Pet Sounds was a foundational influence on this milieu, as were the arrangements of Burt Bacharach.

By the late 1960s, the sound had regional variants ranging from the Free Design in New York to Pic-Nic in Spain, although most acts largely struggled to sustain commercial success amid shifting popular music trends. In the 1970s, new waves of soft rock were heralded by acts such as the Carpenters and Fleetwood Mac, whose successes eclipsed that of many earlier groups. Renewed interest in sunshine pop, initially led by Japanese fans, developed in the 1990s among record collectors and musicians, especially those associated with Tokyo's Shibuya-kei scene, where the work of Roger Nichols was a central influence. Many sunshine pop records were subsequently anthologized and reissued by labels including Rhino (Come to the Sunshine), Collector's Choice, and Sundazed, in addition to indie rock music circles reviving the genre's prominence.

== Origins and definition ==
The Mamas & the Papas – "California Dreamin'" (December 1965)
The Mamas & the Papas defined sunshine pop and early soft rock with songs such as "California Dreamin'", described by author and musician Bob Stanley as encapsulating a "pure sunshine" sound with "more than a hint of sadness".

Sunshine pop originated from California-based pop songwriters and producers. The West Coast music scene of the mid- to late 1960s had provided a fertile environment for studio-oriented pop musicians experimenting with rock, folk, and psychedelic influences. Within this milieu were numerous artists who contributed to the development of sunshine pop, including Brian Wilson, leader of the Beach Boys, and John Phillips, leader of the Mamas & the Papas, who combined idealistic themes with undercurrents of melancholy, along with lesser-known acts that achieved fleeting commercial success. A.V. Club contributor Noel Murray argued in 2011 that records by Phillips and Wilson had attained a cultural stature so large "that it's hard [today] to hear them as part of any kind of trend", in direct contrast to the less successful contemporaneous work of producer-songwriter-performer Curt Boettcher.

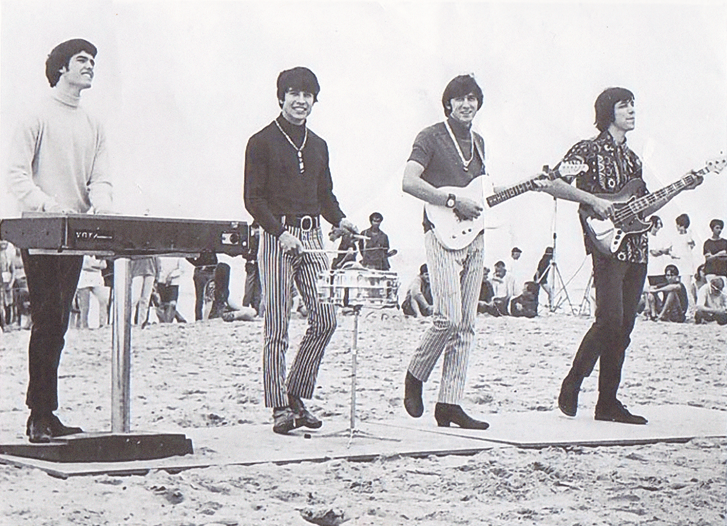
"Sunshine pop" was coined in the 1990s for a strain of 1960s pop acts, many with names referencing fruits, colors, or "cosmic" concepts, such as the Yellow Balloon (pictured) and the 5th Dimension

Sunshine pop music—originally categorized as soft rock and soft pop—mainly encompasses sound-alikes of the Beach Boys, the Mamas & the Papas, and the 5th Dimension. The term was coined retrospectively—akin to other genre labels such as freakbeat, northern soul, and garage punk—in reference to the regularly sundrenched climate of California and gained traction among music historians and collectors long after the 1960s. Author Kingsley Abbott credited Record Collector editor Peter Doggett with originating the term in a September 1997 article feature, though the phrase "LA-style sunshine pop" had previously appeared in Vernon Joynson's 1993 book Fuzz, Acid and Flowers.

The genre's boundaries remain loosely defined partly due to the absence of contemporary self-identification by artists as "sunshine pop" practitioners. Many of the groups straddled multiple styles, including folk rock, bubblegum pop, garage rock, and psychedelia. In addition to receiving limited critical attention during their initial activity, many acts had existed briefly while adapting to evolving musical trends. Other rock and pop bands not normally associated with the genre occasionally produced singles or albums that integrated its sound. Among interpretations of the genre's criteria, AllMusic's entry for sunshine pop describes it as a "mainstream pop style" characterized by "rich harmony vocals", "lush orchestrations", and an optimistic ethos. Music critic Richie Unterberger defined the genre as "the most ridiculously optimistic, commercial outgrowth of folk-rock that could be imagined", adding that the style "was not so much folk-influenced rock as folk-rock-influenced pop, sometimes very much in an easy listening, Mamas-&-the-Papas mold, such as Spanky & Our Gang". Author David Howard characterizes "soft pop" as a "harmonic, slightly psychedelic vocal music genre" that modernized "traditional pop vocals [via] hip lyrics, breezy harmonies, and an effervescent production style".

Associated acts usually drew elements from easy-listening, commercial jingles, and countercultural themes, often juxtaposing idyllic imagery with a subtle awareness of societal change, and bore names referencing fruits, colors, or "cosmic concepts". While occasionally incorporating elements of psychedelia, they generally avoided overt drug-related imagery, instead drawing from what AllMusic termed the "whimsical" and "warm" aspects of psychedelic pop. Stylistically, sunshine pop also intersected with baroque pop, folk-pop, and Brill Building pop. Author and musician Bob Stanley, who identifies sunshine pop as an early soft rock variant, frames the genre as developing upon the progressive "instrumentation", "musical complexity", and subversion of rock traditions exemplified by the Beach Boys' Pet Sounds (1966) and the Beatles' Sgt. Pepper's Lonely Hearts Club Band (1967). (Note: These were elements that a September 1967 Billboard report had linked to "sophisticated" and "serious" pop music trends, predating the coining of "progressive rock".) Stanley additionally traces the genre's preoccupation with exotic arrangements and unorthodox combinations of instruments to the work of Burt Bacharach and Hal David.

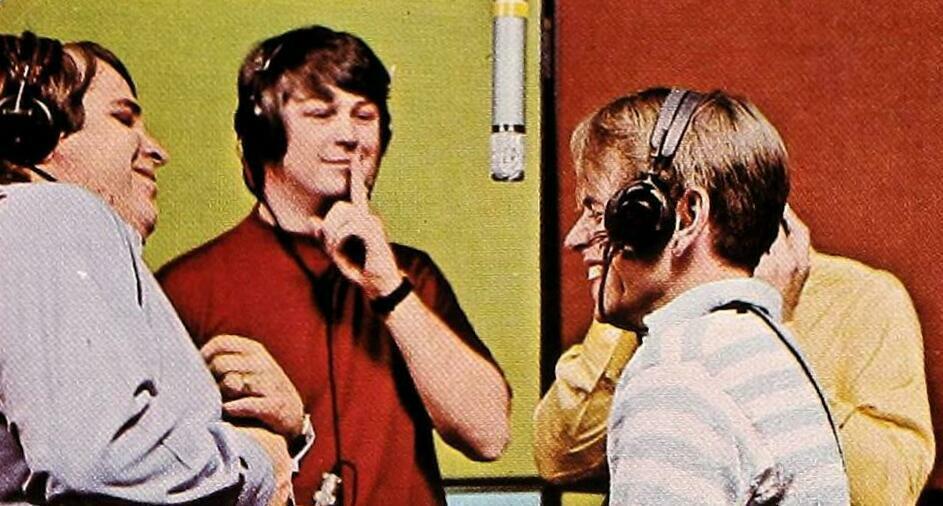
The Beach Boys recording Pet Sounds in early 1966. While Brian Wilson's production techniques were a pivotal influence on sunshine pop producers, the group's sound was largely distanced from the genre.

According to AllMusic, the "star" sunshine pop acts included the Beach Boys circa Pet Sounds, the Association, and the Mamas & the Papas, among others, with later reappraisals bringing renewed attention to lesser-known groups like Sagittarius, the Yellow Balloon, and the Millennium. While Wilson's production techniques substantially influenced subsequent sunshine pop developments, the Beach Boys' output largely diverged from the genre's core characteristics. Murray states that Phillips, to a clearer extent than Wilson, "practically created the blueprint for sunshine pop, with little of Wilson's uncommercial weirdness." (Note: Wilson commented in 1968, "[the Mamas & the Papas] have as much vocal as we do [backing] track […] whereas, I think, we emphasize a little more track than vocal". Goldenburg opines that "the vocals of sunshine pop songs are a little more anonymous and not as lushly featured as that of The Beach Boys", with the genre's "light touch" resembling that of "soft samba". He concluded that their album Friends had represented "the closest [they] came to the genre".) Howard traces the genre to Boettcher and his collaborations with Gary Usher—especially Boettcher's reconfigurations of the "California sunshine sound" originally formulated by Wilson and Terry Melcher.

Compilation albums and retrospectives have since anthologized works from the genre, though some recordings appear interchangeably across "bubblegum pop" collections. Murray felt that while sharing superficial similarities with bubblegum, the latter's repetitive structures and superficial themes contrast with the "emotional richness" of the "best" examples of sunshine pop. In Bubblegum Music Is the Naked Truth (2001), contributor Chris Davidson writes that the "most blinding [sunshine pop] matches bubblegum's oomph", although "where bubblegum says, 'I got love in my tummy,' s-pop exclaims: 'I love the flower girl.'"

== Formative acts and commercial breakthrough ==
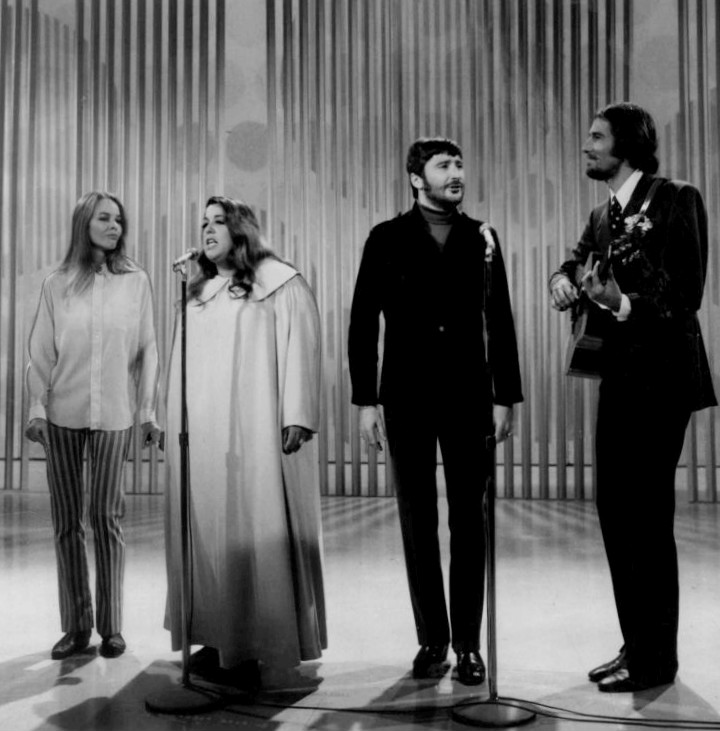
The Mamas and the Papas (pictured at a 1968 television performance) were formative influences on early soft rock and a template for easy listening-aligned sunshine pop styles

The Mamas and the Papas, formed in New York's Greenwich Village, broke through in early 1966 with "California Dreamin'" (December 1965). The group achieved three transatlantic hits that year: "California Dreamin'" (number 4), "Monday, Monday" (number 1), and "I Saw Her Again" (number 5). Their debut album If You Can Believe Your Eyes and Ears, produced by Lou Adler, incorporated choral musical traditions with contemporary countercultural sensibilities. Stanley identified the group as "torchbearers for soft rock" with a "hugely influential" music style later reconfigured by sunshine pop acts such as the 5th Dimension ("who added a touch more soul"), the Millennium ("a touch more rock"), and the Free Design ("a touch more jazz").

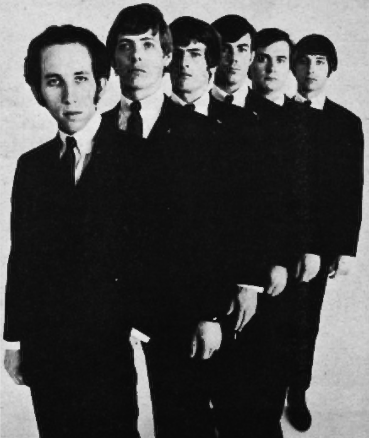
The Association (pictured in a 1966 promotional shot) were one of several sunshine pop acts produced by Curt Boettcher. Their sound combined folk and progressive jazz influences.

Curt Boettcher, originally from Minnesota, relocated to Los Angeles in the mid-1960s with a background in traditional folk music. According to Howard, he was a "crucial figure in the further maturation of the California Sound" from which sunshine pop originated. Boettcher became a sought-after producer for acts including the Association, for whom he produced the 1966 singles "Along Comes Mary" (March) and "Cherish" (August), the latter topping the Billboard Hot 100 for three weeks in September. (Note: Boettcher's involvement with the Association extended only to their July 1966 debut album And Then... Along Comes the Association, which furthered his exploration of studio technique.) Author Domenic Priore cites "Along Comes Mary" and "Cherish" as "the defining influence on sunshine pop" through the group's blending of Stan Kenton's progressive jazz, the Byrds' reconfiguration of traditional folk, and the Beach Boys' jazz-influenced vocal arrangements. According to Howard, the success of these singles cemented the Association "as one of the main purveyors of [what was] dubbed 'soft pop'", a sound that "quickly became a staple of AM radio and a decided antidote to the hard and heavy direction rock was taking on FM." Howard additionally credits Boettcher with redirecting the development of the California sound into a "sunshine pop direction".

Van Dyke Parks' debut single "Come to the Sunshine", recorded in early 1966 and released that September, preceded the trend of sunlit-themed records like Donovan's "Sunshine Superman" (July) and the Beatles’ "Good Day Sunshine" (August). Stanley references Boettcher and Parks, alongside Randy Newman, as further examples of formative soft rock writers who "had a strong sense of the Great American Songbook and, quite often, sharp humor". Many preeminent Los Angeles-based producers had emulated the Beach Boys' orchestrations following their May 1966 release Pet Sounds, though the group's continued association with sunshine pop through singles such as "Good Vibrations" (October 1966) and "Heroes and Villains" (July 1967) were limited to "the spirit of the sound", according to Murray. (Note: Jimmy Webb later described Pet Sounds as a critical touchstone for his peers, while Warner Bros. Records staff producer Lenny Waronker, whose subsequent work included collaborations with acts such as Harpers Bizarre alongside Newman and Parks, also acknowledged the album's widespread influence on California-based producers and songwriters: "Brian affected us all".)

== Proliferation and expansion ==
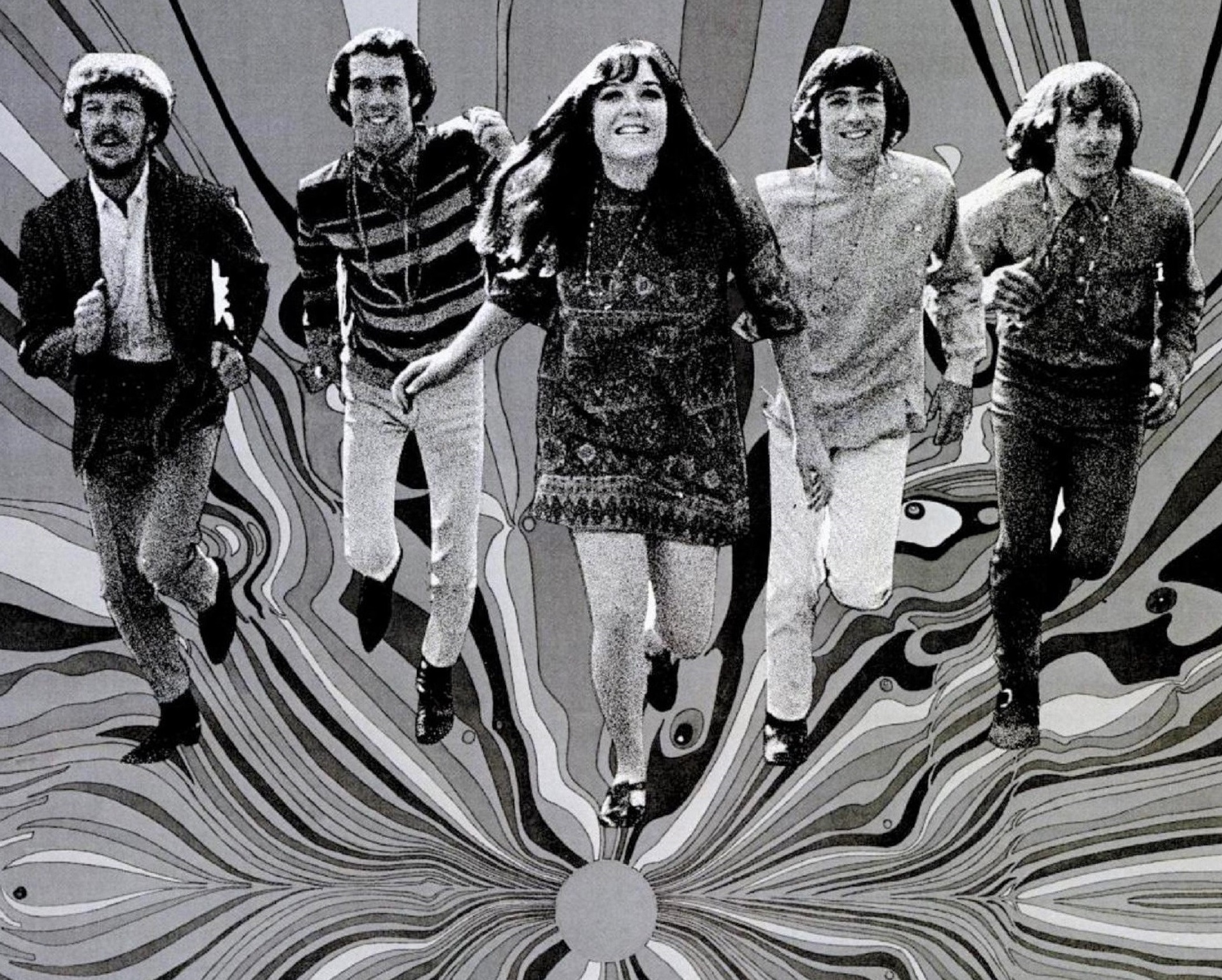
The Sunshine Company (pictured in a 1967 ad), initially a folk-rock band, were among numerous Los Angeles groups who performed sunshine pop material written by external songwriters

Following the breakthrough of the Mamas & the Papas and the Association in 1966, numerous soft pop acts emerged, including the Cyrkle, Harpers Bizarre, Spanky & Our Gang, and the 5th Dimension. According to Unterberger, a vacuum "filled by [a] brigade of sunshine pop acts, mostly from Southern California" followed the dissolution of many of "the foremost good-time folk-pop-rock bands".

Sunshine pop permeated pop culture of the late 1960s; Priore offered examples including the Turtles' 1967 Pepsi advertising jingle, an Association soundalike group featured in a scene from the 1969 film The Love God?, and theme songs for the television programs To Tell the Truth and Nanny and the Professor. The Yellow Balloon and the Parade are further cited by Priore as "[t]wo of the most dedicated sunshine pop acts". The former derived from songwriter-producer Gary Zekley's re-recording of "Yellow Balloon" (1967), a song initially attempted by Dean Torrence of Jan & Dean, while the Parade, formed by producer and Zekley collaborator Jerry Riopelle, achieved a 1967 hit with "Sunshine Girl".

The 5th Dimension – "Up, Up and Away" (May 1967)
The 5th Dimension's "Up, Up and Away", written by Jimmy Webb. Setting a template for numerous sound-alikes, the group was one of the few sunshine pop acts that achieved numerous top 40 hits.

Most sunshine pop acts struggled to achieve sustained commercial success. An exception was the 5th Dimension, who performed material penned by Jimmy Webb and Laura Nyro. Identified by Stanley as a "soft rock innovator", Webb's "Up, Up and Away" (May 1967) was his first hit for the 5th Dimension, reaching number 7 in the U.S. Folk-rock groups also experienced chart success by integrating material written by external songwriters into their repertoire of covers and originals, including the Sunshine Company, who enjoyed a top 40 hit with Steve Gillette's "Back on the Street Again" (1967). Murray cites them, alongside the Yellow Balloon, as exemplifying numerous Los Angeles groups that originated from collaborations between professional songwriters and local "scenesters". Peter, Paul and Mary’s 1967 single "I Dig Rock and Roll Music" parodied Donovan and the Mamas & the Papas, achieving chart success during the same period.

After his success with the Association, Boettcher maintained an active career through collaborative projects and studio work, forming the band the Ballroom and recording an unreleased album for Warner Bros. before joining Columbia Records through Gary Usher, a producer, songwriter, and early Beach Boys collaborator who had been central to the development of the California sound. Their partnership included work on Usher's experimental pop studio project Sagittarius, while Boettcher simultaneously organized a collective of Los Angeles session musicians and songwriters for his own group, the Millennium. (Note: Released in mid-1967, Sagittarius' debut record "My World Fell Down", featuring Bruce Johnston, Terry Melcher and Glen Campbell sharing lead vocals, charted in the upper-reaches of the Billboard Hot 100, though it reached the top 5 on regional charts in San Francisco and Chicago.)

While Los Angeles musicians had extensive resources available to them in their development of large-scale pop records, other regions attempted to replicate the style with more limited means, such as the Free Design in New York. In Spain, the style was popular in 1968 through groups such as Pic-Nic, Granada Los Ángeles, and Los Iberos. From 1969 through the 1970s, Spanish artists like Los Yetis, Solera, Módulos, Nuevos Horizontes, and Vainica Doble contributed to a proliferation of locally produced soft pop music.

== Decline and later soft rock ==
In 1968, many musicians and songwriters shifted toward heavier, extended rock compositions, while others, such as the Left Banke and the Zombies, embraced softer approaches distinct from prevailing trends. In Stanley's description: "Seriousness – an element of pop which had periodically surfaced [...] was now seen to trump everything else." By then, the Beach Boys had faced an abrupt commercial decline that sustained after aligning their style closer to the more contemporaneously successful sunshine pop acts they had influenced, showcased on Friends (June 1968). In July, Columbia issued Sagittarius’ Present Tense and the Millennium's Begin, costly productions which failed to achieve mainstream success amid growing preferences for harder rock, reducing Boettcher and Usher's industry prominence. Although Boettcher's late-1960s efforts saw limited commercial success, they ultimately became some of the most popular records in collectors' markets. (Note: Sandy Salisbury, who collaborated with both producers’ primary projects, recorded Sandy in 1968—a "more aggressive" iteration of sunshine pop, according to Murray, that remained unreleased until 2000. With Keith Olson, Boettcher also co-produced the 1968 debut album by Mississippi folk group Eternity's Children, whose single "Mrs. Bluebird" achieved modest chart success.)

Soft rock persisted into the 1970s but became increasingly detached from rock's evolving album-oriented direction and progressive musical developments. (Note: The approaches signaled by Pet Sounds, Sgt. Pepper, and Webb's extended pop song "MacArthur's Park" (1968) were largely abandoned as self-contained authorship and avoidance of orchestral arrangements became artistic expectations among a wide contingent of young listeners. Webb enjoyed further success with hits penned for Richard Harris ("MacArthur Park") and Glen Campbell through 1969 before transitioning into a more subdued singer-songwriter approach in his career. Campbell also found greater success as a solo artist after distancing his sound from "My World Fell Down".) Stanley describes what he terms "the new school of soft rock", epitomized by Harry Nilsson, as "scholarly, engaging, super-melodic, [and] as fond of Broadway and booze as [...] the Beach Boys and the Beatles". By the early 1970s, the Carpenters had emerged as a defining soft rock act through a string of hits written by songwriters such as Bacharach, Paul Williams, and Leon Russell. Fleetwood Mac's 1977 album Rumours attained ubiquitous airplay on American radio, cementing a new form of soft rock that was further distanced from "the ba-ba-bas of its sixties forebear", according to Stanley.

== 1990s revival, Shibuya-kei, anthologies, and reissues ==
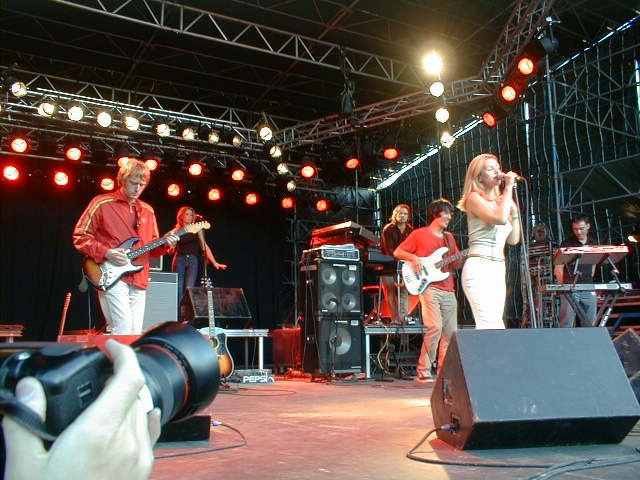
Saint Etienne (pictured), the High Llamas, Wondermints, Pizzicato Five, and Flipper's Guitar were among a circle of musicians who revived interest in sunshine pop after the 1990s.

Major rock critics of the 1960s had largely overlooked many artists later associated with sunshine pop; Murray writes that while critics occasionally embraced the Beach Boys, contemporaries such as the Mamas & the Papas and the Association were often disregarded. During the 1990s, renewed interest in soft pop was propelled through bands such as Saint Etienne (co-founded by Stanley), the High Llamas, and the Wondermints, alongside record collectors and critics who reassessed the style now termed sunshine pop.

Sunshine pop record collecting culture was initially centered in Japan during the early 1990s. Concurrently, a short-lived musical movement in Tokyo's district sought to revive aspects of the genre. Acts such as Pizzicato Five and Flipper's Guitar became leading proponents of Shibuya-kei (渋谷系), with the sunshine pop group Roger Nichols & the Small Circle of Friends serving as a central influence. While incorporating contemporary electronic elements, the movement retained the upbeat characteristics of 1960s Californian pop. Abbott suggests that Japan's receptiveness to sunshine pop stemmed partly from compatibility between its softer vocal styles and Japanese linguistic cadences, as well as the country's longstanding embrace of American vocal harmony traditions since the early 1960s.

Following a growing appreciation for sunshine pop among indie rock music circles, record labels such as Collector's Choice and Sundazed were significant in reissuing obscure sunshine pop recordings during this period. In 2004, Rhino Records released the multi-artist anthology Come to the Sunshine: Soft Pop Nuggets from the WEA Vaults. By 2008, further compilations included Sunshine Days (Varese Sarabande) in the U.S., spanning five volumes; Ripples (Sequel/Sanctuary) in Britain, comprising eight volumes; The Melody Goes On (M&M) in Japan, released in two volumes; and The Get Easy Sunshine Pop Collection (Universal/Boutique) in Germany.

== See also ==
- List of sunshine pop artists
- Art pop
- Progressive pop

== Bibliography ==
- Abbott, Kingsley (2008). 500 Lost Gems of the Sixties. Ovolo. ISBN 978-1-905959-06-8.
- Cooper, Kim; Smay, David, eds. (2001). Bubblegum Music is the Naked Truth. Feral House. ISBN 978-0-922915-69-9.
- Granata, Charles L. (2003). Wouldn't it Be Nice: Brian Wilson and the Making of the Beach Boys' Pet Sounds. Chicago Review Press. ISBN 978-1-55652-507-0.
- Howard, David N. (2004). Sonic Alchemy: Visionary Music Producers and Their Maverick Recordings. Hal Leonard Corporation. ISBN 978-0-634-05560-7.
- Priore, Domenic (2007). Riot on Sunset Strip: Rock 'n' Roll's Last Stand in Hollywood. London: Jawbone Press. ISBN 978-1-906002-04-6.
- Reynolds, Simon (2011). Retromania: Pop Culture's Addiction to Its Own Past. Faber & Faber. ISBN 978-1-4299-6858-4.
- Stanley, Bob (2013). Yeah Yeah Yeah: The Story of Modern Pop. Faber & Faber. ISBN 978-0-571-28198-5.
- Unterberger, Richie (2003). Eight Miles High: Folk-rock's Flight from Haight-Ashbury to Woodstock. Backbeat Books. ISBN 978-0-87930-743-1.
