= Where the Action Is! Los Angeles Nuggets: 1965–1968 =

Box set by Various Artists
- Released: September 22, 2009
- Recorded: 1964–1968
- Genres: Psychedelic rock, garage rock
- Label: Rhino

Nuggets series chronology
Love Is the Song We Sing: San Francisco Nuggets 1965–1970 (2007)	Where the Action Is! Los Angeles Nuggets: 1965–1968 (2009)

Professional ratings
Review scores
Source	Rating
Allmusic	4.5/5 stars

Where the Action Is! Los Angeles Nuggets: 1965–1968 is the fifth box set in Rhino Records' Nuggets series, released September 22, 2009. The set's four discs each focus on a different aspect of the underground rock music scene in and around Los Angeles at the end of the 1960s. The first disc, "On the Strip", features bands that rose out of the Sunset Strip scene; disc two, "Beyond the City", focuses on bands from the surrounding areas outside the city's borders; disc three, "The Studio Scene" covers bands' attempts to exploit the Los Angeles sound for a commercial audience; while disc four presents the movement away from psychedelic and garage rock towards the country rock sound which became popular in the city late in the decade. The boxed set was compiled and curated by Los Angeles native, Andrew Sandoval. On December 1, 2010, this project was nominated for a Grammy Award in the Best Historical Album category.

== Track listing ==
=== Disc one: "On the Strip" ===
1. "Riot on Sunset Strip" – The Standells
2. "You Movin'" – The Byrds
3. "You I'll Be Following" – Love
4. "Dr. Stone" – The Leaves
5. "Go and Say Goodbye" – Buffalo Springfield
6. "Zig Zag Wanderer" – Captain Beefheart & His Magic Band
7. "Gentle as It May Seem" – Iron Butterfly
8. "Candy Cane Madness" – Lowell George & The Factory
9. "If You Want This Love" – The West Coast Pop Art Experimental Band
10. "Baby My Heart" – The Bobby Fuller Four
11. "All Night Long" – The Palace Guard
12. "It's Gonna Rain" – Sonny & Cher
13. "For My Own" – The Guilloteens
14. "Take a Giant Step" – Rising Sons
15. "One Too Many Mornings" – The Association
16. "Time Waits for No One" – The Knack
17. "Take It as It Comes" – The Doors
18. "Pulsating Dream" – Kaleidoscope
19. "Tripmaker" – The Seeds
20. "The People In Me" – The Music Machine
21. "Saturday's Son" – The Sons of Adam
22. "Eventually" – The Peanut Butter Conspiracy
23. "Swim" – Penny Arkade
24. "The Third Eye" – The Joint Effort
25. "Girl in Your Eye" – Spirit

=== Disc two: "Beyond the City" ===
1. "Jump, Jive & Harmonize" – Thee Midniters
2. "Back Up" – The Light
3. "To Die Alone" – The Bush
4. "Get on This Plane" – The Premiers
5. "Little Girl, Little Boy" – The Odyssey
6. "Hideaway" – The Electric Prunes
7. "Listen, Listen!" – The Merry-Go-Round
8. "She Done Moved" – The Spats
9. "Grim Reaper of Love" – The Turtles
10. "See If I Care" – Ken & The Fourth Dimension
11. "He's Not There Anymore" – The Chymes
12. "Back Seat ‘38 Dodge" – Opus 1
13. "Eternal Prison" – The Humane Society
14. "Revenge" – The Others
15. "Come Alive" – Things to Come
16. "Acid Head" – The Velvet Illusions
17. "Guaranteed Love" – Limey & the Yanks
18. "Love's the Thing" – The Romancers
19. "Underground Lady" – Kim Fowley
20. "Pretty Little Thing" – The Deepest Blue
21. "You're Wishin' I Was Someone Else" – The Whatt Four
22. "Hippy Elevator Operator" – The W.C. Fields Memorial Electric String Band
23. "That's for Sure" – The Mustangs
24. "Tomorrow's Girl" – Fapardokly (Merrell & the Exiles)
25. "Everything's There" – Hysterics
26. "Our Time Is Running Out" – The Yellow Payges

=== Disc three: "The Studio Scene" ===
1. "Action, Action, Action" – Keith Allison
2. "The Rebel Kind" – Dino, Desi & Billy
3. "High on Love" – The Knickerbockers
4. "Fan Tan" – Jan & Dean
5. "Halloween Mary" – P. F. Sloan
6. "Somebody Groovy" – The Mamas & the Papas
7. "Daydreaming" – Thorinshield
8. "Just Can't Wait" – The Full Treatment
9. "Yellow Balloon" – The Yellow Balloon
10. "The Times to Come" – London Phogg
11. "No More Running Around" – The Lamp of Childhood
12. "Little Girl Lost-and-Found" – The Garden Club
13. "Mothers and Fathers" – The Moon
14. "My Girlfriend Is a Witch" – October Country
15. "Montage Mirror" – Roger Nichols Trio
16. "Flower Eyes" – The Pasternak Progress
17. "Come Down" – The Common Cold
18. "Jill" – Gary Lewis & the Playboys
19. "Daily Nightly" – The Monkees
20. "Night Time Girl" – Modern Folk Quintet
21. "Don't Say No" – The Oracle
22. "Tin Angel (Will You Ever Come Down)" – Hearts and Flowers
23. "Rainbow Woman" – Lee Hazlewood
24. "Poor Old Organ Grinder" – Pleasure
25. "Baby, Please Don't Go" – The Ballroom

=== Disc four: "New Directions" ===
1. "Sit Down, I Think I Love You" – Stephen Stills and Richie Furay
2. "Splendor in the Grass" – Jackie DeShannon with The Byrds
3. "November Night" – Peter Fonda
4. "Roses and Rainbows" – Danny Hutton
5. "Lemon Chimes" – The Dillards
6. "Here's Today" – The Rose Garden
7. "I Love How You Love Me" – Nino Tempo & April Stevens
8. "Words" (demo) – Boyce and Hart
9. "(You Used To) Ride So High" – The Motorcycle Abeline (Warren Zevon & Bones Howe)
10. "Los Angeles" – Gene Clark
11. "Once Upon a Time" – Tim Buckley
12. "Darlin' You Can Count on Me" – The Everpresent Fullness
13. "I'll Search the Sky" – The Nitty Gritty Dirt Band
14. "Come to the Sunshine" – Van Dyke Parks
15. "Heroes and Villains" (alternate take) – The Beach Boys
16. "She Sang Hymns Out of Tune" – Jesse Lee Kincaid
17. "Sister Marie" – Nilsson
18. "Last Night I Had a Dream" – Randy Newman
19. "Life Is a Dream" – Noel Harrison
20. "Marshmallow Skies" – Rick Nelson
21. "I Think I Love You" – Del Shannon
22. "Change Is Now" – The Byrds
23. "The Truth Is Not Real" – Sagittarius
24. "You Set the Scene" – Love
25. "Inner-Manipulations" – Barry McGuire

== Credits ==
- Compiled by Andrew Sandoval
- Remastered by Andrew Sandoval, Dan Hersch
- Compilation producers: Andrew Sandoval, Alec Palao, Cheryl Pawelski
- Cover design: Mark London
- Research: Alessandra Quaranta, Steven P. Gorman, Bill Inglot
- Editorial supervision: Sheryl Farber
- Art supervision: Aaron Gershman
- Product manager: Matt Abels
- Licensing: David Ponak
