= The Palace Guard =

American garage rock band

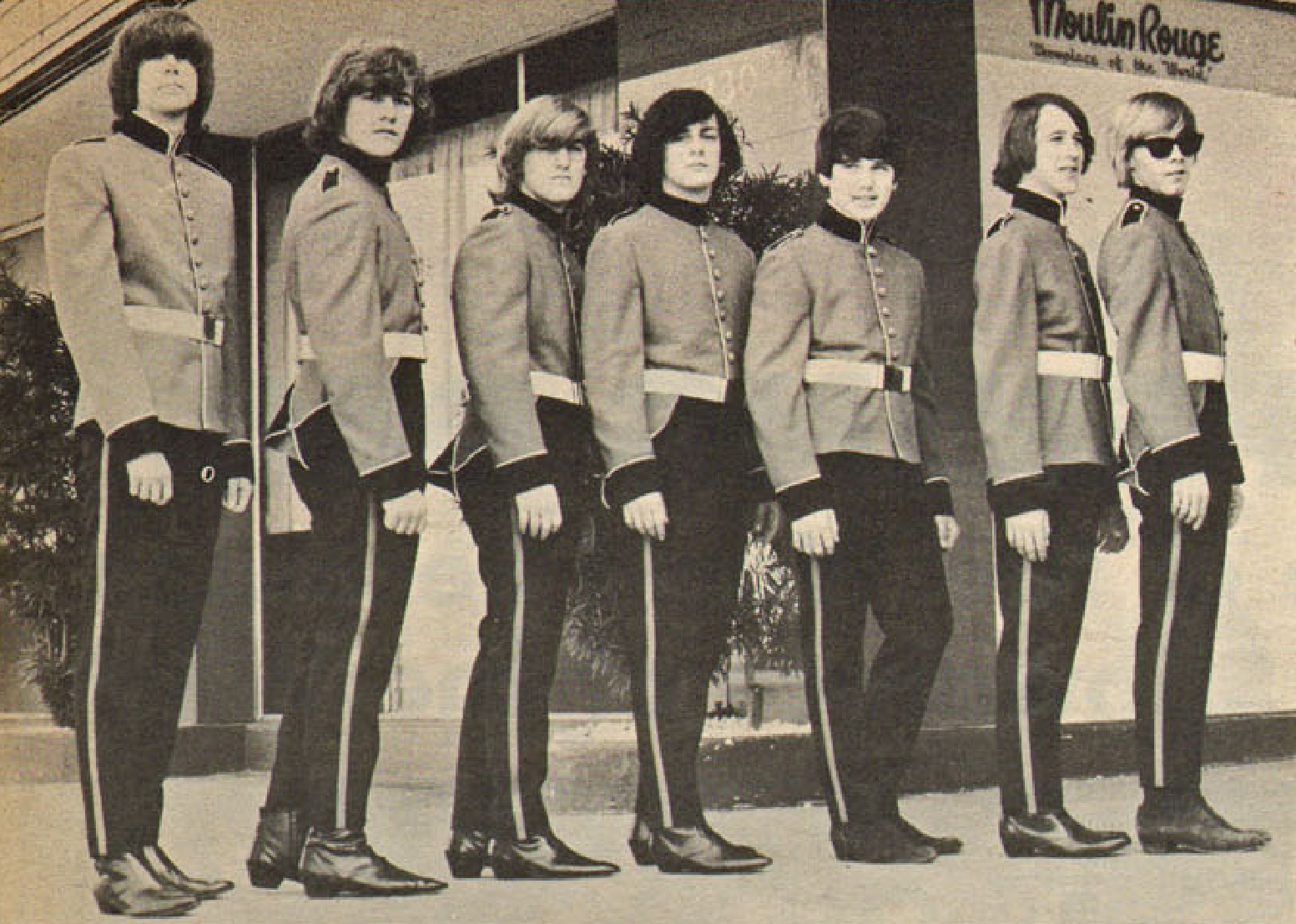
- The Palace Guard outside the Moulin Rogue club. Left to right: Chuck McClung, Don Beaudoin, Jon Beaudoin, Dave Beaudoin, Emitt Rhodes, Rick Moser, Mike Conley.

Background information
- Origin: Los Angeles, California, United States
- Genres: Garage rock; folk rock; pop rock
- Years active: 1964–1970
- Labels: Orange-Empire; Cameo-Parkway
- Spinoff of: The Emerals
- Past members: Emitt Rhodes; Rick Moser; Chuck McClung; Mike Conley; Dave Beaudoin; Jon Beaudoin; Don Beaudoin; Don Grady; Terry Rae; Fredy Benton

The Palace Guard was an American garage rock band formed in Los Angeles, California in 1964. Though the band never obtained national success, they made a huge splash in Southern California with their song "Falling Sugar". The group is also notable for featuring the first commercial appearance of Emitt Rhodes, later a member of the Merry-Go-Round.

== History ==
The foundation of the Palace Guard was set in early 1964 with the formation of the Emerals in Los Angeles. (The Emerals are sometimes incorrectly noted as the Emeralds; however, The Emerals chose their name after deciding it sounded more "exclusive" than "Emeralds.")

Several members of the Emerals left the band after a contract dispute, including drummer Emitt Rhodes. However, Rhodes then had a change of heart, reconciling with some of his former Emerals bandmates and rechristening themselves the Palace Guard. The earliest lineup consisted of Rhodes, Rick Moser (bass guitar), Mike Conley (rhythm guitar), Chuck McClung (piano), and brothers David (tambourine, vocals), John (tambourine, vocals), and Don Beaudoin (lead guitar). For a brief period, the band also featured actor Don Grady—contributing vocals, keyboards, and drums—of My Three Sons fame, who went on to become a member of the sunshine pop band the Yellow Balloon. Grady stayed with the Palace Guard to record one obscure single, "Little People", in early 1965, which was credited to Don Grady and the Palace Guard.

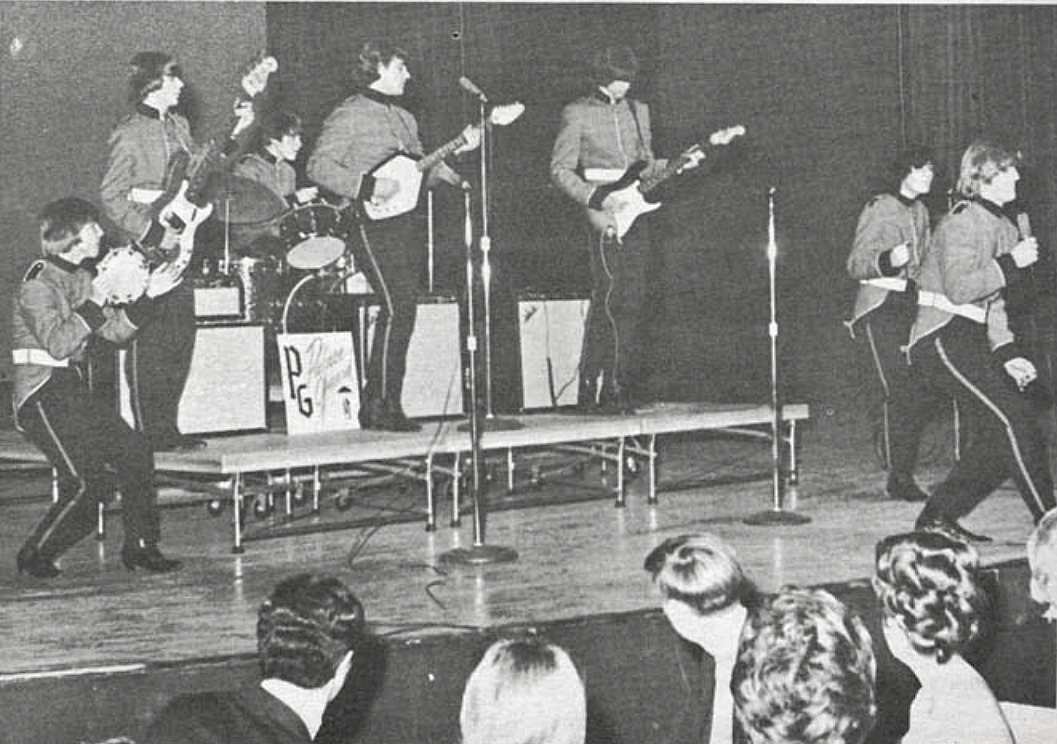
The Palace Guard performing in December 1965

The band was known for their style of dress, clothing themselves in military-themed red coats, as if they were members of the Queen's Guard. After months of rehearsal, the Palace Guard's big break came when KRLA deejay Casey Kasem invited the group to perform on his local television dance show Shebang. In mid-1965, the group began an extended residency at the Hullabaloo club, on Sunset Boulevard, earning popularity as a need-to-see attraction in Los Angeles. Two singles followed on the Orange-Empire record label, before the group scored a regional hit with "Falling Sugar" in early 1966, described by music historian Lenny Kaye as "a catchy Moptop-ish toe tapper brimming with youthful fervor". "Falling Sugar", like most of their material, derived from a blend of folk rock and the harmonic sound of the Beatles.

Rhodes began to have larger ambitions, both as a songwriter and to become a guitarist, leading him to depart the band to form the Merry-Go-Round and reaching number 63 on the Billboard Hot 100 with his song "Live". His replacement Terry Rae, formerly of the Driftones, an early version of the Yellow Payges, recalls in an interview that prior to leaving Rhodes "used to bring up his acoustic guitar and sing "Yesterday" at the Hullabaloo while he was with The Guard. I think this gave him the inspiration to play guitar full time, and to do only his material". After Rhodes' departure, the Palace Guard signed to Cameo-Parkway Records, releasing "Greed" and "Saturday's Children". However, with no national distribution in sight for the group, they decided to disband in mid-1970.

Since their disbandment, the Palace Guard's songs have been compiled on several compilation albums, including the Nuggets albums Nuggets Volume Four: Pop Part Two, the 1998 expanded box-set reissue of Nuggets: Original Artyfacts from the First Psychedelic Era, 1965–1968, and Where the Action Is! Los Angeles Nuggets 1965–1968. On February 23, 2003, Gear-Fab Records released all of the band's recorded material on The Palace Guard album.
