= The Yellow Balloon =

The Yellow Balloon may refer to:

- The Yellow Balloon (band), a 1967 American sunshine pop band
  - "Yellow Balloon", a song by the band
- The Yellow Balloon (film), a 1953 British film
