= Reverse tape effects =

Special effects created by playing recordings backwards

Reverse effect are special effects created by recording sound onto magnetic tape and then physically reversing the tape so that when the tape is played back the sounds recorded on it are heard in reverse. Backmasking is a type of reverse tape effect.

== History ==
In 1877, Thomas Edison invented the phonograph, a device allowing sound to be recorded and reproduced on a rotating cylinder with a stylus (or "needle") attached to a diaphragm mounted at the narrow end of a horn. Emile Berliner invented the familiar lateral-cut disc phonograph record in 1888. In addition to recreating recorded sounds by placing the stylus on the cylinder or disc and rotating it in the same direction as during the recording, one could hear different sounds by rotating the cylinder or disc backwards. In 1878, Edison noted that, when played backwards, "the song is still melodious in many cases, and some of the strains are sweet and novel, but altogether different from the song reproduced in the right way".

Reverse effects were regarded largely as a curiosity and were little used until the 1950s. The 1950s saw two new developments in audio technology: the development of musique concrète, an avant-garde form of electronic music, which involves editing together fragments of natural and industrial sounds, and the concurrent spread of the use of tape recorders in recording studios. These two trends led to tape music compositions, composed on tape using techniques including reverse tape effects.

The reverse tape technique became especially popular during the psychedelic music era of the mid-to-late 1960s when musicians and producers exploited a vast range of special audio effects.

== Examples ==
One of the best-known examples of music featuring reverse tape effects is the Doctor Who theme (1963), composed by Ron Grainer and realised electronically by Delia Derbyshire of the BBC Radiophonic Workshop.

Several The Beatles songs of the period — including Revolver (1966) tracks "I'm Only Sleeping" and "Tomorrow Never Knows" — also feature recordings of electric guitars, sitars and "birds" which have been reversed. Another famous example of the use of reverse tape effects is their 1967 single "Strawberry Fields Forever." During the verses, Lennon's voice is accompanied by a series of rapid "swooshing" sounds; these are actually the sounds of Ringo Starr's drum and cymbal accompaniment. These patterns were carefully pre-recorded, the tape reversed and the reversed percussion effects meticulously edited into the master tape to synchronise with the music.

Around the same time, Jimi Hendrix recorded backward guitar for tracks such as "Are You Experienced?" and "Castles Made of Sand," both released 1967. Stephen Stills, a close friend of Jimi Hendrix, used the effect on Graham Nash's song "Pre-Road Downs" from Crosby, Stills & Nash's debut album.

Occasionally, record labels would use a reverse tape song on the B-side of a single, to ensure that only the A side got radio play. One example is "Noolab Wolley" by the US group The Yellow Balloon; A-side “Yellow Balloon” was a big cheery harmony-drenched slice of sunshine pop that went to #25 in Billboard in the spring of 1967. The flip side of the single reversed the tape to create a surprisingly listenable off-kilter bit of shoopy drums and near-psychedelic "lyrics" that worked pretty well. In the year prior, there was "Aaah-ah, Yawa Em Ekat Ot Gnimoc Er’yeht" by Napoleon XIV (Jerry Samuels). In the original song "They’re Coming To Take Me Away, Ha-Haaa!", Samuels created one of the most bizarre one-hit oddities of the 1960s, going to #1 in Cashbox, #3 in Billboard, #4 in the UK, and #2 in Canada in the summer of 1966. The reverse version fared reasonably well on the flip side, since the martial drumming of the A side remained more or less intact, and the lyrics were only slightly less warped.

Another example of the use of reverse tape effects can be heard in the song "Roundabout" by the British progressive rock group Yes, on their 1972 album Fragile. The song begins with a sound which gradually fades in, and then ends suddenly, changing abruptly into guitar music, performed by guitarist Steve Howe. The "fade-in" sound is a minor chord (played on a grand piano by keyboardist Rick Wakeman) that was sounded and allowed to fade to silence. The tape of this piano chord was then reversed by producer Eddy Offord and carefully edited into the track. With the fading piano sound is thus reversed, it slowly builds up in volume before ending suddenly, at which point Offord edited it seamlessly into the first notes of Howe's guitar introduction. This distinctive effect is heard several times during the introduction and its reprise.

== See also ==
- Backmasking
- Tape loop
