= Acid Dreams =

Compilation album by Various Artists
- Released: 1979 (United Kingdom) 2 February 2009 (re-release) (United States) 14 April 2009 (re-release)
- Genre: Psychedelic rock, garage rock, acid rock
- Label: n. a.

Acid Dreams is an unofficial compilation album of American acid rock, garage rock and psychedelic rock songs recorded in the 1960s. It was originally produced in 1979 by a German record shop owner, inspired by Elektra Records' Nuggets series

== History ==
In 1979, a Berlin record shop owner issued Acid Dreams and pressed only 77 copies. The album was primarily available in his store, though some copies were shipped to friends or label owners. The album was heavily bootlegged, and in 1988, a compilation titled Acid Dreams Testament collected 13 of the original's 18 tracks, and added 15 more songs. Acid Dreams Epitaph followed in 1996 on Head Records, with 31 tracks. Past & Present Records reissued Acid Dreams Epitaph in February 2009 with some changes in the tracks.

== Critical reception ==
Professional ratings
Review scores
Source	Rating
Allmusic	4/5 stars
PopMatters	(6/10)

Author and journalist Richie Unterberger noted that although many of the album's songs can be heard on other compilations, "a listen to Acid Dreams does remind veteran collectors of how unusual and exciting this stuff sounded before the style had been mined to death on other reissues, and when the few compilations available really did tend to zero in on authentically killer tracks instead of lumping a whole bunch of generic items together." Music journalist Alan Ranta called the album "a brilliantly assembled exploration of pre-punk snarl and righteous feedback the likes of which is essential for freaking out the squares." While Ranta criticized the album's sound quality, Ptolemaic Terrascope's Jeff Penczak said "these snarling slabs of attitude deserve to be heard in all their analog glory."

== Track listing ==
1. White Light – "William" (2:02)
2. The Caretakers of Deception – "Cuttin' Grass" (2:31)
3. The Outcasts – "1523 Blair" (1:46)
4. The Music Machine – "You'll Love Me Again" (1:52)
5. Mystic Tide – "Frustration" (2:44)
6. The Stereo Shoestring – "On the Road South" (2:16)
7. The Velvet Illusions – "Velvet Illusions" (2:06)
8. Unrelated Segments – "Where You Gonna Go" (2:49)
9. Beautiful Daze – "City Jungle" (5:47)
10. The Painted Faces – "Anxious Colour" (2:32)
11. Teddy and His Patches – "Suzy Creamcheese" (3:11)
12. The Velvet Illusions – "Acid Head" (3:07)
13. The Vejtables – "Shadows" (3:13)
14. Faine Jade – "It Ain't True" (3:11)
15. The Balloon Farm – "A Question of Temperature" (2:38)
16. Minds Eye – "Help I'm Lost" (2:31)
17. Zakary Thaks – "Can You Hear" (2:33)
18. Remaining Few – "Painted Air" (3:38)
