= The Knack (1960s US band) =

American garage/psychedelic rock band

Background information
- Origin: Los Angeles, California, United States
- Genres: Garage rock; psychedelic rock
- Years active: 1965-1968
- Label: Capitol
- Past members: Mike Chain; Dink Kaplan; Larry Gould; Ken Meyers; Bobby Cochran; Pug Baker

The Knack was an American garage and psychedelic rock band from Los Angeles, California who were active in the 1960s. They are not to be confused with either the American band of the same name who became popular in the late 1970s, nor the British band of the same name in the 1960s. They were noted for their melodic and instrumental finesse and secured a recording contract with Capitol Records. The band nevertheless failed to break through to a national audience. In the intervening years their work has come to the attention of 1960s music collectors and enthusiasts, especially with the release of the Time Waits for No One anthology.

== History ==
The Knack were formed in 1965 at by students at Hollywood High and Fairfax High School led by Michael Chain. The original name for the band was the InMates. Their original line-up consisted Mike Chain on lead vocals and rhythm guitar, Dink Kaplan on lead guitar, and Larry Gould on bass and backing vocals, and Ken Meyer on drums. After traveling on a Shindig! road show, the band changed their name to the Knack. Dink Kaplan's older brother played in the Mothers of Invention. Not long after forming, Meyer left the group and was replaced by Pug Baker on drums. The band initially played on the high school circuit, but had advanced to the more popular clubs on the Sunset Strip: the Hullabaloo, the Whisky a Go Go, the Galaxy, the Trip, The Crescendo, Gazzarri’s, It’s Boss, the Cheetah, the Cherokee, the Sea Witch, and others. They were also the first rock group to appear at the Ice House folk room and the Troubador. The Knack eventually performed shows at larger venues such as the Hollywood Bowl, the Hollywood Palladium, Melody Land, and the Carousel.

The group's manager, Abe and Rick Marcelli, arranged for Nick Venet, who had been the Beach Boys producer, to come to a club to see them perform on stage. Venet later invited A&R personnel at Capitol Records, which paved the way for the band to be signed by the famous label. Venet had produced all of the Knack's recordings at Capitol, and Mike Chain had composed most of the songs. The Knack recorded all of their songs at Studio A at the Capitol Records' headquarters on Hollywood and Vine. They played all their own instruments, which was unusual in Los Angeles studios at the time, particularly in light of their young age, with most of the band members still in high school. The band was regarded for their instrumental and melodic finesse. The band's debut single for Capitol was "Time Waits For No One" b/w "I'm Aware, " which is set in a minor key. In 1967 Capitol released their second single, "Softly Softly", a slower song, which included Frank Zappa on piano, backed with "The Spell", a more upbeat number.

Capitol scheduled the group on a cross-country tour as part of their promotional strategy. This resulted in the formation of numerous fan clubs, but Capitol’s insistence on using the hyperbolic motto, "better than The Beatles," led to an ill-fated marketing campaign. Chain was opposed to the use of the motto, but was overruled by the rest of the band. Later in 1967 the band released their third single, "Pretty Daisy" b/w "Banana Man." "Pretty Daisy" has a trumpet part played by a session man. After Dink Kaplan had left, he was replaced by Bobby Cochran on lead guitar. In 1968 Capitol released their last single "Freedom Now" b/w "Lady In The Window." The band broke up in 1969.

Mike Chain, along with the Merry-Go-Round’s Gary Kato, had formed the Pinkiny Canandy, which had recorded for Uni Records. He later did tours in Iraq and Afghanistan for American soldiers.

In the intervening years the Knack have come to the attention of 1960s music collectors and enthusiasts. Their work has been featured on several compilations such as the Where the Action Is! Los Angeles Nuggets: 1965–1968 four-disc CD box set put out by Rhino Records. Their complete recorded works have been collected on the Time Waits for No One anthology assembled by New Sound Records.

== Membership ==
=== 1965 ===
- Mike Chain (lead vocals and rhythm guitar)
- Dink Kaplan (lead guitar)
- Larry Gould (bass and backing vocals)
- Ken Meyer (drums)

=== 1966-1967 ===
- Mike Chain (lead vocals and rhythm guitar)
- Dink Kaplan (lead guitar)
- Larry Gould (bass and backing vocals)
- Pug Baker (drums)

=== 1968-1969 ===
- Mike Chain (lead vocals and rhythm guitar)
- Bobby Cochran (lead guitar)
- Larry Gould (bass and backing vocals)
- Pug Baker (drums)

== Discography ==
- "Time Waits for No One" b/w "I'm Aware" (Capitol 5774, 1966)
- "Softly, Softly" b/w "The Spell" (Capitol 5889, 1967)
- "Pretty Daisy" b/w "Banana Man" (Capitol 5940, 1967)
- "Freedom Now" b/w "Lady in the Window" (Capitol 2075, 1968)
