= The Mystic Tide =

American garage rock band (1965–1967)

- Origin: Long Island, New York, United States
- Genres: Psychedelic rock, garage rock
- Years active: 1965–1967
- Labels: Esquire, Solid Sound, Distortions, Numero Group
- Past members: Joe Docko; Paul Peisel; Jim Thomas; John Willems

The Mystic Tide were an American rock band who have been credited for creating some of the first psychedelic anthems. Despite their lack of commercial success, they are now highly regarded amongst followers of garage rock and are recognized for their innovative musical approach.

The group formed on Long Island and released a total of four singles between 1965 and 1967, all of which were written by the band's guitar player, Joe Docko. The band broke up in 1967 after little commercial success. Many years later in 1994 Docko recorded some new material and that along with three demos, the band's five original singles, and their B-sides would be put out as a CD by Distortions records. Released more than 25 years after the group had disbanded, Solid Sound/Solid Ground, was the first and only album the band ever made.

In 2024, The Numero Group announced the release of a new compilation entitled Frustration.

== Discography ==
=== Singles/acetates ===
- I Wouldn't Care (unissued acetate - Ultrasonic, 1965)
- "Stay Away" b/w "Why" (Esquire 4677, October 1966)
- "Mystic Eyes" b/w "I Search For A New Love" (Esquire 719/720, December 1966)
- "Frustration" b/w "Psychedelic Journey (Part 1)" (Solid Sound WB 156/7, March 1967)
- "Running Through The Night" b/w "Psychedelic Journey Pt 2" (Solid Sound 158/9, April 1967)
- "Mystery Ship" b/w "You Won't Look Back" (Solid Sound 321/2, August 1967

=== Compilation albums ===
- Acid Dreams (Past & Present) 1979
- E-Types vs. Mystic Tide LP (Eva EVA 12037) 1983
- It Comes Now LP (Distortions DB 1006) 1991
- Solid Sound/Solid Ground (Distortions DR 1006) 1994
- Frustration (2024, Numero Group)
