= Farewell to Paradise =

Studio album by Emitt Rhodes
- Released: 1973
- Recorded: 1973
- Studio: Emitt Rhodes' home
- Genre: Rock, pop, jazz-funk, soul
- Label: Dunhill
- Producer: Emitt Rhodes

Emitt Rhodes chronology
Mirror (1971)	Farewell to Paradise (1973)	Rainbow Ends (2016)

Professional ratings
Review scores
Source	Rating
Allmusic	3.5/5 stars

Farewell to Paradise (1973) is the fourth album by Emitt Rhodes. An eclectic mixture of rock, pop, jazz-funk and soul. Due to the pressure of his record label suing him for his failure to complete his contract for 6 albums in 3 years, many of the songs exhibit more somber, gloomy tones than Rhodes' previous albums.

"Those That Die" is derived from "Tame The Lion", a furious anti-war song that was issued as a single in July 1972. "Tame the Lion" has a fast tempo, and "Those That Die" uses part of the lyrics from the bridge of "Tame the Lion", but at a slow tempo and chords from a minor key.

The initial pressings of this album were mispressed and featured the audio from Well Done, an unreleased album by the Toronto band Dixie Rumproast (which finally saw release in 2020). Some of these are still in circulation.

== Track listing ==
All songs by Emitt Rhodes

Side one

1. "Warm Self Sacrifice"
2. "See No Evil"
3. "Drawn to You"
4. "Blue Horizon"
5. "Shoot the Moon"
6. "Only Lovers Decide"

Side two

1. "Trust Once More"
2. "Nights Are Lonely"
3. "Bad Man"
4. "In Desperate Need"
5. "Those That Die"
6. "Farewell to Paradise"

== Personnel ==
- Emitt Rhodes - all instruments and voices
- Keith Olsen - mixdown engineer
- Richard Dashut - assistant mixdown engineer
