= The Velvet Illusions =

American garage rock band

The Velvet Illusions, also known as Georgy and the Velvet Illusions and the Illusions, were an American garage rock band formed in Yakima, Washington in 1965. The group, with influences spanning from R&B standards, the British Invasion, to early psychedelia, released five singles in their brief recording career. Despite never breaking out nationally, the band's music has been revived, thanks, in large part, to its inclusion on several compilation albums, most notably Where the Action Is! Los Angeles Nuggets: 1965–1968.

== History ==
The group originated from a jam session between Randy "Jimmie James" Bowles (lead guitar, vocals) and Chuck Funk (rhythm guitar) in 1965. Funk recommended rehearsing with neighbor George Radford (saxophone) at his parents' upholstery shop, with the resulting session encouraging the trio to form a band Randy Bowles named the Illusions. Radford's father elected to manage the group, supplying them with Vox equipment and velvet outfits. Upon discovering that another band was known as the Illusions, the band changed their moniker to the Velvet Illusions to emphasize their unusual gimmick. The band added to their personnel when they recruited Steve Weed (keyboards, vocals), formerly of the local group the Shy Guys, Larry "Lurch" Linse (bass guitar), and Danny Wagner (drums).

The expanded lineup continued to hone their skills and develop a chemistry as an ensemble at Radford Sr.'s upholstery shop. The Velvet Illusions achieved a sizable regional fanbase by renting a music hall called Nob Hill Grange where the group held several battles of the bands, most typically with rival group the Fluorescents. With a live repertoire encompassing covers of material by the Rolling Stones, the Beatles, and the Monkees, as well as novelty songs such as "Snoopy vs. the Red Baron", "Mellow Yellow", and "Winchester Cathedral", the Velvet Illusions were what Bowles explains as their manager's desire to make the group "clean cut alternatives to other bands of the period". In addition to the usual array of gigs, the band also appeared on KIMA TV to promote their Vox instruments. The group strenuously denies that the company sponsored them during their existence.

In early 1966, the band added guitarists Danny Wohl and Dewayne Russell. Also during this time, the Velvet Illusions began recording at Audio Recorders in Seattle. In mid-1966, the band released their debut single "Acid Head", a composition about a woman suffering from a drug addiction, coupled with the Weed-penned "She Was the Only Girl", on Tell International Records. However, the single failed to reach a national audience when radio stations refused to play "Acid Head" for its drug references. Two more singles, "Town of Fools" and the psychedelia-tinged group theme song "Velvet Illusions", were recorded in Audio Recorders, and released in rapid succession on Radford Sr.'s self-produced record label Metro Media. "Town of Fools" was particularly successful in the Northwest region; however, the band was limited by the small market and sought to relocate to another more prominent music scene.

In June 1967, the Velvet Illusions concluded a tour of the Northwest, and moved to Los Angeles in hopes of promoting their music on a national scale. Linse left the group before the transition to keep commitments to the United States Army Reserve, and Russell departed over disagreements in musical direction. Former Shy Guy bassist Dale Larrison was recruited by Weed, as was his brother Gene Weed, who withheld duties as the band's co-manager. The group worked persistently at promoting their music, particularly "Acid Head", which the Velvet Illusions performed on the Yakima television program Summer Wild Thing in a failed effort to lift the radio ban. Still, the song's removal from the airways earned the band notoriety in Los Angeles and the Northwest where they soon became a popular live attraction. Reflecting on the radio ban, Bowles said its "fine, because today, 'Acid Head' is collected all over the planet, is well-represented on compilation LP’s and CD’s, and is all over YouTube and internet radio. So we did fine with that song!".

However, Radford Sr.'s controlling managing style caused disgruntlement within the group, resulting in Bowles and Wagner returning to Yakima. The final lineup of the Velvet Illusions saw the additions of drummer Jon Juette, and future Earth, Wind, and Fire guitarist Roland Bautista. Internal debate between Radford Sr. and the band minimized the group's willingness to continue performing. An additional two singles, "Lazy" and a song about the group's perspective on the hippie scene called "Hippy Town", were recorded in Sunset Recorders and released in November 1967. With the final releases credited to Georgy and the Velvet Illusions without the group's consent, the band members decided to disband the Velvet Illusions in December 1967. Upon returning to Yakima, former Velvet Illusions Weed, Larrison, Wagner, Wohl, and Bowles reconvened as a group known as the Peppermint Tea, and finally enjoyed the freedoms of managing themselves. The band was short-lived, considering the small market they were situated in, and broke up by the end of 1967.

Despite never receiving much promotion outside Los Angeles, the Velvet Illusions' music has since been featured on several compilation albums, and the band itself is considered within collector circles as "The great lost California psychedelic band" (despite not being native to the state). The group first appeared on Acid Dreams, and have also been included on Acid Dreams Testament, Pebbles, Volume 9, Garagelands, Volume 2, Sixties Archive, Volume 8, and Where the Action Is! Los Angeles Nuggets: 1965–1968. In 2011, the Velvet Illusions' material spanning across their five singles was compiled on the album Acid Head, on Cherry Red Records. Over time, it has been revealed the Velvet Illusions recorded the unreleased songs "Grow Up Young Man", "Lonely Girl", and "Bigfoot". The tune "Bigfoot", the most peculiar of the three songs, was composed in 1966 in response to the Bigfoot craze in the Northwest.

In 2015, Moi J'Connais Records released a Velvet Illusions vinyl LP, another compilation album that features all of the group's material. It was particularly successful, selling out its initial press run.
