= Emitt Rhodes (album) =

Studio album by Emitt Rhodes
- Released: 20 December 1970
- Recorded: 1970
- Genre: Power pop, baroque pop
- Length: 31:10
- Label: Dunhill
- Producer: Emitt Rhodes, Harvey Bruce

Emitt Rhodes chronology
The American Dream (1970)	Emitt Rhodes (1970)	Mirror (1971)

Professional ratings
Review scores
Source	Rating
Allmusic	4.5/5 stars
Christgau's Record Guide	B−
The Village Voice	B−

Emitt Rhodes is the second album by Emitt Rhodes, released in 1970, although it is generally considered to be his debut album, as The American Dream was a contractual obligation, released without Rhodes' input.

Rhodes recorded the album in his home studio. At the time, union rules required that recordings released on major labels must be recorded in proper studios, so the fact that this was a home recording could not be mentioned on the cover. The runout groove of the original LP release on Dunhill Records contained a decorative banner proclaiming, "Recorded at Home." Rhodes wanted to call the album Homecooking, but Dunhill decided to title it Emitt Rhodes.

Rhodes recorded the instruments on a four-track recorder and then approached Dunhill, who gave him a contract. He transferred the four-track instrumental recordings to an eight-track recorder to add the vocals on the four additional channels (and using a better microphone).

The album reached number 29 on the Billboard album chart. The single "Fresh as a Daisy" reached number 54 on the Hot 100. Billboard later called the album one of the "best albums of the decade".

The song "Lullabye" was featured in the film The Royal Tenenbaums.

Alt-country singer Tift Merritt recorded a cover of "Live Till You Die" on her 2010 album See You on the Moon.

== Track listing ==
All tracks written by Emitt Rhodes.

Side one
No.	Title	Length
1.	"With My Face on the Floor"	3:06
2.	"Somebody Made for Me"	2:23
3.	"She's Such a Beauty"	2:21
4.	"Long Time No See"	3:14
5.	"Lullabye"	1:05
6.	"Fresh as a Daisy"	2:46
Total length:		14:55

Side two
No.	Title	Length
1.	"Live Till You Die"	2:44
2.	"Promises I've Made"	3:21
3.	"You Take the Dark Out of the Night"	2:54
4.	"You Should Be Ashamed"	2:38
5.	"Ever Find Yourself Running"	2:34
6.	"You Must Have"	2:04
Total length:		16:15

== Personnel ==
- Emitt Rhodes - all instruments and voices
- Keith Olsen - mixdown engineer
- Curt Boettcher - mixdown engineer
