= Emitt Rhodes =

American singer-songwriter (1950–2020)

- Rhodes in 1973

Background information
- Born: February 25, 1950; Decatur, Illinois, U.S.
- Origin: Hawthorne, California, U.S.
- Died: July 19, 2020 (aged 70) Hawthorne, California, U.S.
- Genres: Power pop; psychedelic pop; baroque pop
- Instruments: Vocals, drums, guitar, piano, bass guitar, percussion
- Years active: 1964–2020
- Labels: A&M; Dunhill; Omnivore Recordings
- Formerly of: The Palace Guard; The Merry-Go-Round

Emitt Lynn Rhodes (February 25, 1950 – July 19, 2020) was an American singer-songwriter, multi-instrumentalist and recording engineer. A cult figure of baroque pop and power pop, he is best known for his solo albums, released from 1970 to 1973, on which he played every instrument and pioneered home recording techniques. He was nicknamed the "One-Man Beatles" due to his musical and vocal style.

At the age of 14, Rhodes began his career as the drummer of the Emerals (later renamed the Palace Guard). He then formed the band The Merry-Go-Round for which he was the leader and primary songwriter on the band's only album, The Merry-Go-Round (1967). In 1969, Rhodes left the band and began a solo career. His self-titled 1970 album, recorded in his parents' garage and on which he played all instruments, was acclaimed upon release. After its first single "Fresh as a Daisy" reached #54 on the Billboard pop charts, A&M Records released an album of Rhodes's The Merry-Go-Round songs as The American Dream (1970), credited solely to Rhodes and released without his input.

Rhodes recorded and released two more albums, Mirror (1971) and Farewell to Paradise (1973). However, he could not meet demands required by his contract with ABC/Dunhill Records and quit performing after 1973 to work as a recording engineer and producer. In 2014, Rhodes began working with producer Chris Price on new music. Rainbow Ends (2016), his first album in 43 years, features Rhodes accompanied by a backup band; it received positive reviews.

== Early life ==
Emitt Lynn Rhodes was born on February 25, 1950, in Decatur, Illinois. Around the age of four, he moved with his parents to Hawthorne, California. His father, a machinist, was "lured" to California by the aerospace industry. Rhodes attended Hawthorne High School.

== Career ==
=== 1964–1969: The Palace Guard and the Merry-Go-Round ===
When Rhodes was in the sixth grade, he discovered a passion for music after he enrolled in a school drum class to avoid studying. At the age of 14, he became the drummer of the garage band the Emerals, made up of friends from his high school. Rhodes initially joined the group as a substitute drummer as the previous drummer had fallen ill, but he was popular with audiences and became the group's permanent drummer. He also became the drummer largely because his parents had a garage that the band could practice in. Rhodes attended the same school as the Beach Boys drummer Dennis Wilson (Rhodes was a freshman during Wilson's senior year) and joked that "[Wilson] borrowed my drums and broke a drum pedal and owes me one of those. I've yet to receive it." After a bicycle accident left Rhodes with a broken arm and leg, he fell behind in his studies and eventually dropped out of school in the ninth grade to pursue a music career.

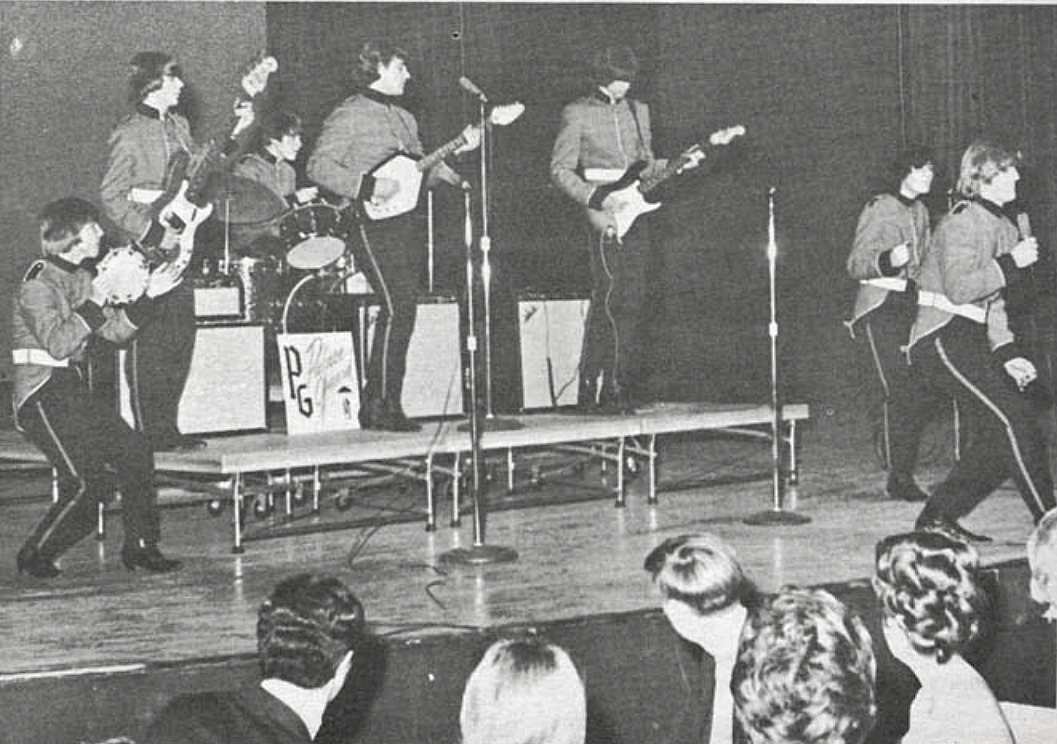
Rhodes drumming for The Palace Guard in December 1965

By 1965, the band was known as The Palace Guard. They were musically influenced by the Byrds and the Beatles, and dressed in the red uniform of royal British guardsmen. The band regularly played two shows a night, six nights a week at the Hullabaloo on the Sunset Strip. Rhodes was given one solo spot per show—performing the Beatles song "Michelle", originally sung by Paul McCartney. In 1966, The Palace Guard released their single "Falling Sugar". The Palace Guard were briefly the backing band for Don Grady. Rhodes left the band after Russ Shaw, son of music publisher Eddie Shaw at A&M Records, caught Rhodes singing "Michelle" and convinced him to sign with A&M.

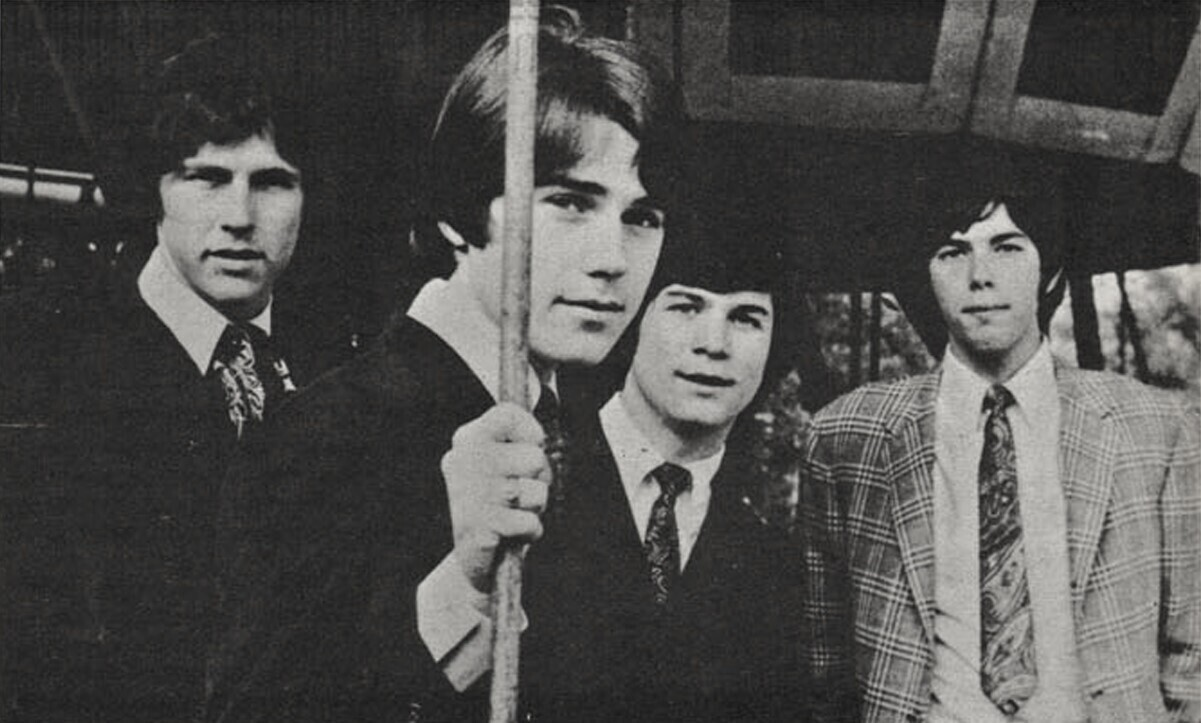
Rhodes (second from left) with The Merry-Go-Round

Rhodes formed the psychedelic pop band The Merry-Go-Round, of which he was the leader and primary songwriter. The band signed a contract with A&M. The band was a West Coast take on British Invasion music. Their 1967 self-titled album, on which Rhodes wrote 10 of its 12 songs, charted at #190, and the single "Live", written by Rhodes, reached #63 on the Billboard Hot 100. They also had the top 100 hit "You're a Very Lovely Woman". The band featured on the ABC television variety show "The Hollywood Palace". Around this time, Rhodes appeared on the television game show The Dating Game. A&M left the band in 1969, and the group disbanded the same year.

=== 1969–1973: Solo artist ===
Rhodes pursued a solo career, and he began making his own demo recordings in a garage behind his parents' house which he had converted into a home recording studio. These recordings, which Rhodes estimated as representing "half" of his eventual album Emitt Rhodes (1970), caught the attention of Harvey Bruce, an A&R man from ABC/Dunhill Records. Bruce recommended Rhodes to his boss, Jay Lasker, who signed Rhodes to a solo contract. Rhodes signed a contract with ABC/Dunhill requiring him to record an album every six months for three years. Neither Rhodes nor his parents consulted an attorney before signing the contract. Rhodes invested the $5,000 advance from A&M into his home studio, and began recording his planned debut solo album, performing all of the instruments and vocals himself.

His single "Fresh as a Daisy" (1970) reached #54 on the pop chart and stayed there for nine weeks. To bank off its success, A&M released the album The American Dream (1970), a compilation of tracks Rhodes had recorded with studio musicians during his time in The Merry-Go-Round to fulfill his contract with A&M. Rhodes did not approve of the release and was allowed little input.

His self-recorded album Emitt Rhodes released in 1970 to critical success. Billboard called Rhodes "one of the finest artists on the music scene today" and in 1996 called the album one of the "best albums of the decade". It reached #29 on the Billboard charts. However, the near-simultaneous release of two albums credited to Rhodes confused record buyers and stunted his career momentum. His musical style was considered similar to the Beatles and Paul McCartney, leading some listeners to speculate that the album was a secret Beatles or McCartney record. He was subsequently dubbed the "one-man Beatles". On whether he was bothered by comparisons to McCartney, Rhodes stated in 1971: "A little bit, but I really don't agree. The Beatles themselves have definitely influenced my music, but only as a group, not as any one individual." Rhodes has stated that John Lennon appealed to him more, and in 2002 called Beatles comparisons "really flattering. Those guys were my idols."

Rhodes described himself as foremost a songwriter, stating he was "really not a performer... I perform because it is necessary and it's also another means of communicating". Rhodes toured in support of the album despite his reluctance. He made his solo nightclub debut with a six-night residency at the Troubadour in February 1971, and performed piano and acoustic guitar with a three-man backing band. As his performance occurred simultaneously with the 1971 San Fernando earthquake in Southern California, Billboard joked "That wasn't an earthquake, that was Emitt Rhodes opening at the Troubadour!". However, Rhodes's touring was limited by the demands of needing to quickly record another album to fulfil his contract.

By May 1971, he was writing and recording demos for a follow-up album using an eight-track recorder. Rhodes's next album, Mirror (1971), reached #182 on the Billboard charts. Rhodes toured the United States to support the album, (Note: An article in The Independent states that Rhodes toured to support Mirror, though Rhodes disagreed in a recollection.) and in December he performed at Philharmonic Hall at Lincoln Center in New York City. Rhodes's next album Farewell to Paradise released in 1973; he described it as "probably the best-engineered record I made". Its single "Tame the Lion" (1973) was a protest song about the Vietnam War.

=== 1973–2009: Withdrawal from performing ===
After Farewell to Paradise, which Rhodes has called "a farewell album", Rhodes stepped away from performing due to a legal dispute with Dunhill. He had struggled to meet the schedule of an album every six months as he handled the recording process almost entirely by himself. Rhodes was a perfectionist and spent over nine months recording his self-titled album. By December 1971, Dunhill had sued him for $250,000 and withheld royalties. Additionally, Rhodes had signed away the royalty rights to his songs "in perpetuity". He stated in 2001: "There were lawsuits and lawyers and I wasn't having any fun anymore... Simple as that. I worked really hard and there was no reward". He admitted in 2015 that his contracted recording schedule "was a Herculean task and it was impossible for me to do."

In 1976, Rhodes began working as a recording engineer and record producer for Elektra Records. He produced Bim's 1978 album Thistles, as well as the 1976 novelty single "Up Your Nose" by Gabe Kaplan. In 1978, he began work on a solo album for Elektra Records, but abandoned it after the A&R man he was working with was fired. Rhodes's first solo music since Farewell to Paradise—the song "Isn't It So" (1980)—was released on Listen, Listen: The Best of Emitt Rhodes. After about six years, he left Elektra to work independently, recording artists in his home studio. He rejected an offer to produce The Bangles in the 1980s; they covered "Live" and included it on their debut studio album All Over the Place (1984), though Rhodes did not make royalties from it. Both "Falling Sugar" and "Live" were featured on the influential psychedelic rock compilation Nuggets. Fairport Convention and Linda Ronstadt also covered Rhodes's songs.

Rhodes performed at the 1998 Poptopia Festival. The New York Times reported that Rhodes's contract with a record label in 1999 "went belly up before he got to work". In 2000 he had completed a solo album for the Rocktopia label, but the label was shut down due to financial issues before they could release it. In January 2002, it was reported that Rhodes recorded "a few songs" with musician Ray Paul, but plans for a comeback album were cancelled when the record label closed.

Rhodes's song "Lullabye" was featured in Wes Anderson's 2001 film The Royal Tenenbaums; actor Jason Schwartzman had introduced the song to Anderson. The song's inclusion introduced a new generation to Rhodes. Due to his contract with Dunhill, Rhodes did not receive royalties from the film. By 2015, new agreements were made which allowed Rhodes to profit from his earlier work.

Rhodes's four solo albums were released by Universal in 2009 as The Emitt Rhodes Recordings 1969 – 1973.

=== 2009–2012: The One Man Beatles and new solo recordings ===
In January and February 2009, Italian director Cosimo Messeri shot a documentary film, titled The One Man Beatles, focused on Rhodes. The documentary was selected for the International Rome Film Festival 2009, and it received standing ovations. In 2010, The One Man Beatles was nominated for David di Donatello Award as Best Documentary of 2010. Its U.S. premiere was scheduled for May 29, 2010, at the Rhino Records Pop Up Store in Westwood, Los Angeles.

In 2009, Rhodes once again entered the recording studios with a new band and all-new material, joined by the co-founder of The Grass Roots and The Merry-Go-Round drummer Joel Larson, co-founder and former bassist for Counting Crows, Matt Malley, and guitarists Jim Rolfe and Dan Mayer.

In 2010, Rhodes, along with Matt Malley, joined Iain Matthews on a new version of "Time Will Show the Wiser," arranged, produced and performed by Nick Vernier Band. This recording, initially released on Nick Vernier Band's Sessions album, marked Rhodes's first new release as a featured artist in almost four decades. Both Rhodes and Matthews recorded this Rhodes original early on in their careers, the song being starting points as well as signature works for the Merry-Go-Round and Fairport Convention respectively. The new version united the two singers in an Indian musical setting. Also in 2010, a tribute album titled Long Time, No See was released. It contained Rhodes's songs recorded by various artists.

In 2010, Rhodes recorded four songs with Richard Thompson and Bangles members Vicki Peterson and Debbi Peterson. On November 3, 2011, "Just Me And You", "What's A Man to Do" and "This Wall Between Us" were released on iTunes. These were removed from sale shortly after release, by recording facility 201 Studios. The project fell apart due to litigation.

=== 2013–2020: Rainbow Ends ===
Chris Price produced Rhodes's final album, Rainbow Ends (2016).

Musician and producer Chris Price personally approached Rhodes around 2007, and Rhodes turned down an offer to produce Price's music. After about five years, Rhodes showed Price unrecorded songs he had written. In 2014, Rhodes and Price began working on a full album of songs, recorded in his original home studio, intended as a stylistic continuation of Farewell to Paradise. During these sessions, Rhodes recorded a cover of the Bee Gees hit "How Can You Mend a Broken Heart" for the tribute album To Love the Bee Gees, released in November 2015 by 80 Proof Records and Tapes. On April 18, 2015, the recording was released as a limited edition 45 rpm single on red vinyl, as a Record Store Day exclusive.

On November 12, 2015, it was announced that Rhodes's first album in 43 years, Rainbow Ends, would be released on February 26, 2016, through Omnivore Recordings. Produced by Price, Rainbow Ends features contributions from musicians Roger Joseph Manning, Jr., Jason Falkner, Aimee Mann, Jon Brion, Susanna Hoffs, Nels Cline, Pat Sansone, Taylor Locke, Fernando Perdomo, Joe Seiders, Bleu, Probyn Gregory, Nelson Bragg and members of the Brian Wilson Band. The first single, "Dog On A Chain", which Rhodes had written in the late 1970s, was premiered by The Wall Street Journal's blog Speakeasy. Rainbow Ends received critical acclaim, including four-star reviews from Mojo, AllMusic, and American Songwriter. Pablo Gorondi of The Washington Post stated that said "in a better world [Rainbow Ends] would have topped the charts in 1978 or so."

After Rainbow Ends’s release, Rhodes cancelled all planned public performances, including a comeback appearance scheduled at South by Southwest in Austin, Texas, as he was unwilling to travel far from his home. According to Price, there were efforts for Rhodes to perform live at an annual Wild Honey benefit show in Los Angeles, but it did not eventuate.

== Home recording techniques ==
"I was a drummer and I had a piano and I had a guitar and I just started there. The next thing I knew I wanted to play the violin and the sax and the flute and the harmonica and the banjo and everything. I’m a tinkerer. I would buy an instrument and an instructional book, and just play scales for an hour a day until I felt comfortable doing it."

— Rhodes in 2001

Around 1966, while still a member of the Merry-Go-Round, Rhodes experimented with two 1/4-inch stereo reel-to-reel tape machines. He placed the machines side by side and ran tape from the supply reel of one machine to the take-up reel of the other, passing it through the heads of both machines but twisting the tape between the two machines so he could record on both sides. He learned engineering techniques by observing audio engineers at A&M Studios work on the Merry-Go-Round's recordings.

With a $5,000 advance from A&M, and the assistance of his friends, Rhodes converted his parents' garage storage shed into a home recording studio. The twenty-foot-long ten-foot-wide room is where he recorded his albums Emitt Rhodes, Mirror and Farewell to Paradise, performing all of the instruments and vocals himself.

On his self-titled album, which he also produced, he used a four-track Ampex 300 tape recorder, three microphones and two Shure mic mixers. Rhodes would begin by recording a metronome to one track as a click track, and later erase it as he recorded the song's individual instruments. Recording was time consuming: "I had the machine on one end and the drums on the other, and I'd press the record button and run over and sit down and put the phones on. It was pretty rudimentary." He did not use compressors or limiters. Rhodes had engineering help from Keith Olsen, who convinced Rhodes to rent a Neumann U 87 microphone for recording vocals. Rhodes transferred the instrumental tracks to a rented 3M eight-track recorder to add vocals. Olsen and engineer Curt Boettcher mixed the album at Sound City Studios. Olsen engraved "Recorded at Home" into the album's vinyl run-out groove.

In addition to their similar musical styles, Rhodes has been compared to Paul McCartney because both musicians released self-titled albums in 1970 that they recorded largely by themselves in a home studio (Emitt Rhodes and McCartney). Kevin Ryan of Tape Op called Emitt Rhodes "the album Paul should have recorded". Ben Beaumont-Thomas of The Guardian stated that Rhodes's "home-recording approach was influential on generations of independent and lo-fi musicians", and in 2020, The Independent credited Rhodes with "practically creating the idea of the home studio".

For his album Mirror, Rhodes sold his Ampex and bought a Scully eight-track recorder. Rhodes later bought a house across the street from his parents and established a new studio in its garage.

== Musical influences ==
Rhodes named Joni Mitchell, James Taylor, the Beatles, John Lennon and Mozart as musical influences. He also named George Harrison as a guitar influence.

== Personal life ==
Rhodes had two sons from his first marriage to Kathy Sharp and one daughter with his second wife, Charnelle Smith. He was engaged to his partner of nine years, Valerie Eaton, at the time of his death.

In interviews, Rhodes referenced his struggles with drugs and alcohol. He was diagnosed with depression and diabetes. The latter condition led to a diabetic coma which caused a car crash in 2001.

== Death ==
Rhodes died in his sleep on July 19, 2020, at his home in Hawthorne, California. Various musicians and creatives influenced by Rhodes paid tribute. Mac DeMarco cited Rhodes as an influence on his album Salad Days (2014), and wrote "Rest in peace Emitt, thanks for all the music, love to your family, god bless ya." Sadie Dupuis stated that she was inspired to start her band Speedy Ortiz due to Rhodes's home studio work. The band Field Music tweeted "His 1st album is a gem - self-recorded in his garage in 1970 - the precocity of Todd Rundgren and oodles of McCartney melodicism. Sometimes talent doesn't translate to success. I hope he found some peace before he died". Film producer Tony Blass stated that he was "honored and blessed to have worked and spent time with him".

== Discography ==
=== Studio albums ===
Title	Album details	Peak chart positions
Title	Album details	US
The Merry-Go-Round (with The Merry-Go-Round)	Released: 1969; Label: A&M	190
The American Dream	Released: 1970; Label: A&M	194
Emitt Rhodes	Released: 1970; Label: ABC/Dunhill	29
Mirror	Released: 1971; Label: ABC/Dunhill Records	182
Farewell to Paradise	Released: 1973; Label: ABC/Dunhill Records	—
Rainbow Ends	Released: 2016; Label: Omnivore	150

=== Singles ===
==== With the Merry-Go-Round ====
Title	Album details	Peak chart positions
Title	Album details	US
"Live"	Released: 1967	63
"Time Will Show the Wiser"	Released: 1967	
"You're a Very Lovely Woman"	Released: 1967	94
"She Laughed Loud"		
"Listen, Listen"		
"'Til the Day After"		

==== Solo ====
Title	Album details	Peak chart positions	
Title	Album details	AUS	US
"Fresh as a Daisy"	Released: 1970	69	54
"You Take the Dark Out of the Night"			
"Live Till You Die"	Released: 1971		Cashbox No. 103
"With My Face on the Floor"			
"Love Will Stone You"			
"Really Wanted You"	Released: 1971		Cashbox No. 108
"Golden Child of God"			
"Tame The Lion" / "Those That Die"	Released: 1972		Record World No. 138
"Isn't It So?"			
"This Wall Between Us", "What's A Man To Do" and "Just Me And You"	Released on iTunes, November 3, 2011 (removed from sale); Re-released on iTunes, February 20, 2015.		
"How Can You Mend a Broken Heart"	B-side: "Please Read Me" by Chris Price Limited edition release for Record Store Day, April 18, 2015.		

=== Collections ===
- Daisy-Fresh from Hawthorne, California (The Best of the Dunhill Years)

Daisy-Fresh includes all of the songs from Emitt Rhodes, six songs from Mirror, four songs from Farewell to Paradise, plus the single "Tame the Lion". Released in 1998 by Edsel Records (EDCD 569).

- Listen, Listen: The Best of Emitt Rhodes

Listen, Listen contains five songs from the Merry-Go-Round, one song from The American Dream, seven songs from Emitt Rhodes, four songs from Mirror, two songs from Farewell to Paradise, plus the single "Tame the Lion" and the previously-unreleased 1980 song "Isn't it So". Released in 1995 by Varèse Sarabande – VSD-5612, Varèse Vintage (VSD-5612).

- The Merry-Go-Round: Listen, Listen: The Definitive Collection

A nearly complete collection of Merry-Go-Round songs, almost all written and sung by Rhodes. The Merry-Go-Round (stereo version) and American Dream LPs are included in their entirety, as are the mono mix of "Time Will Show the Wiser" and a few non-album singles. Not included are the mono mix of The Merry-Go-Round and the unique single mixes of "Come Ride, Come Ride" and "'Til the Day After". Released in 2005 by Rev-Ola (cr rev 110).

- Royal Tenenbaums: Collector's Edition CD

"Lullabye" appears.

- The Emitt Rhodes Recordings (1969–1973)

A two CD Collection released in 2009 by Hip-O Select, A&M Records, Geffen Records (B0012926-02):
- CD 1: The American Dream (all thirteen songs from both versions) and Emitt Rhodes
- CD 2: Mirror and Farewell to Paradise, plus the single "Tame the Lion"
