= The Balloon Farm =

American rock band

- Origin: New Jersey, United States
- Genres: Garage rock, psychedelic rock
- Label: Laurie Records
- Past members: Mike Appel; Don Henny; Ed Schnug; Jay David Saks

The Balloon Farm was an American musical group. Originally from New Jersey, the group took its name from a New York City nightclub. It is best known for its sole hit song, "A Question of Temperature," which made the Billboard charts in February 1968, peaking in the top 40.

== History ==
Two members of the band, Don Henny and Ed Schnug, first played together in a band called Adam, which made one single for the Mala label entitled "Eve" in 1966. Adam's gimmick was that all four members of the group adopted the first name "Adam". They were probably not the first to use this idea, but they were far from the last; a similar ruse would be used by other bands, including The Donnas.

After Adam disbanded, Henny and Schnug were joined by Mike Appel and Jay David Saks. The band adopted the name "The Balloon Farm". The band's first single was "A Question of Temperature", which was released in October 1967. The first pressings of the 45 rpm single contained a typographical error that rendered the title "A Question of Tempature". Another typo, which was never fixed, was the name of the song's producer, Peter Schekeryk, which was spelled "Shekeryk", even after the title of the song was fixed. The single reached a peak of #37 on the Billboard Hot 100, and in the years since has become something of a garage-psych classic. In Canada it reached #48. "A Question of Temperature" has appeared on numerous thematic compilations, including the Rhino box set Nuggets and Acid Dreams.

The follow-up single "Hurry Up Sundown" flopped, and the Balloon Farm was dropped by Laurie before it was able to record an entire album. However, one of the band's unreleased songs, "Sunshine Rides on a Trolley" (also known as "Sunshine Rides on a Trolley Car"), was recorded in Australia by Robbie Snowden, who had a moderate hit with it in 1967.

Later in 1968, the Balloon Farm resurfaced with yet another new name, Huck Finn, and one single on the Kapp label, "Two of a Kind". After that, the band broke up.

Several people involved with "A Question of Temperature" gained greater fame in the 1970s. Schekeryk became Melanie's manager and husband. The arranger, Charlie Morrow, become internationally known for jingles including 'Hefty Wimpy', large-scale art events like TootN Blink and New Wilderness International Solstice celebrations and, in the new millennium, the invention of MorrowSound True3D 3D audio effect. Appel, after co-writing "Doesn't Somebody Want to Be Wanted" and several LP cuts for The Partridge Family, became the first manager of Bruce Springsteen. Saks became a record producer and engineer, working on Broadway show albums and Metropolitan Opera radio, television, and cinema presentations.

== Band members ==
- Mike Appel – guitar, vocals
- Ed Schnug – guitar
- Jay David Saks – bass
- Don Henny – drums
- John Castinovo – keyboards (recordings only)

== Notable covers ==
"A Question of Temperature" was recorded by Brownsville Station on its 1973 album Yeah! the same LP on which "Smokin' in the Boy's Room" appears. It was recorded in 1974 by TNT, a Harrisburg PA area garage band led by Erik Lindgren, and appears on their CD "Mod Psych Power Pop from Central PA." It was recorded by several artists in the 1980s, including The Lords of the New Church on their debut album, Mindflux, Human Sexual Response, Julian Cope as a B-side to "Charlotte Anne" in 1988, and the Vancouver-based punk band The Young Canadians.
