= The American Dream (Emitt Rhodes album) =

Studio album by Emitt Rhodes
- Released: November 1970
- Recorded: 1967–1969
- Genre: Baroque pop
- Label: A&M
- Producers: Larry Marks, Peter Pilafian

Emitt Rhodes chronology
The American Dream (1970)	Emitt Rhodes (1970)

Professional ratings
Review scores
Source	Rating
Allmusic	4/5 stars

The American Dream is Emitt Rhodes' first album. It was recorded from 1967 to 1969, but released in 1970 as a contractual obligation to A&M Records. The album was reissued in 1971 in response to the success of his self-titled debut album on Dunhill Records.

== Track listing ==
All songs by Emitt Rhodes

1. "Mother Earth" – 2:29
2. "Pardon Me" – 2:46
3. "Textile Factory" – 3:04
4. "Someone Died" – 2:04
5. "Come Ride, Come Ride" – 2:53
6. "Let's All Sing" – 2:41
7. "Holly Park" – 2:59
8. "You're a Very Lovely Woman" – 2:52
9. "Mary Will You Take My Hand" – 2:21
10. "The Man He Was" - 2:59
11. "In the Days of the Old" – 2:13
12. "'Til the Day After" – 2:46

The original issue was a non-commercially released version pressed in late November 1970 with picture-frame cover and "Saturday Night" – 1:59. A&M quickly withdrew this "frame cover" after approximately 1000 copies had been pressed. Deciding that the album did not have enough "hit potential," A&M chose a song from Rhodes' previous band The Merry-Go-Round, "You're A Very Lovely Woman," to replace "Saturday Night," which can only be found on this release.

The album was then reissued in March 1971 with the paint-splatter cover image and the replacement song found on all subsequent releases. Though according to music historian Martin Popoff, the paint splatter version was first (1970), and the "frame" cover with "Saturday Night" came after (1971).

"Saturday Night" does appear on Listen, Listen — the Definitive Collection of The Merry-Go-Round and The Emitt Rhodes Recordings (1969–1973).

== Personnel ==
- Guitars: David Bennett Cohen, Gary Kato, Drake Levin, Donald Peake, Emitt Rhodes
- Bass guitar: Chuck Berghofer, James Leitch, Lyle Ritz
- Keyboards: Pete Jolly, Larry Knechtel, Don Randi, Emitt Rhodes
- Drums: Hal Blaine, Jim Gordon, Joel Larson
- Percussion: John Guerin, Joe Porcaro, Emil Richards
- Woodwinds: Bill Reinhardt, Tom Reynolds, Emitt Rhodes, Michael Rice
