= Acid Head =

Single by The Velvet Illusions
- B-side: "She Was the Only Girl"
- Released: May 1966
- Recorded: 1966, Audio Recording, Seattle, Washington
- Genre: Garage rock; psychedelic rock
- Length: 3:04
- Label: Tell International Records
- Songwriter: Mike Hayes
- Producer: George Radford Sr.

The Velvet Illusions singles chronology
| "Acid Head" (1966) | "Town of Fools" (1967) |

"Acid Head" is a song recorded by the American garage rock band the Velvet Illusions. It first appeared as the A-side to the group's debut single, which was released on Tell International Records in mid-1966. The writing of the composition is credited to keyboardist Steve Weed and the group's manager George Radford, however, it is reported that "Acid Head" actually originated from an outside composer. At the time of its first release, the tune suffered from limited radio-play time. Over time, "Acid Head" has since become recognized as a garage rock classic and is widely accessible on multiple compilation albums.

== Background ==
Prior to recording, the Velvet Illusions developed their chemistry with extensive rehearsal sessions at group manager George Radford Sr.'s upholstery shop in Yakima, Washington. When the band entered Audio Recording in Seattle to record "Acid Head" and keyboardist Steve Weed's original composition "She Was the Only Girl", they were well-practiced and completed the songs with relative ease. Under Radford Sr.'s instruction, the group shortened the tune's climatic instrumental passage to approach the preferred time limit that radio programmers desired. "Acid Head" is credited to Weed and George Radford on its original release and subsequent appearances on albums; however, in reality, the song was penned by a writer outside the Velvet Illusions' membership named Mike Hayes. Later on, it was revealed the manager listed George Radford, without the identifier "Sr.", to financially provide for his son, who was the band's saxophonist.

Contrary to its suggestive title, "Acid Head" is actually an anti-drug statement about a woman suffering with a drug addiction. In fact, the lyrics themselves exemplify a sense of cluelessness from the composer on the actual use of LSD. Upon release, the song's chances for commercial success were slim, as it went widely unheard by audiences after radio stations refused to promote the single. A radio ban was enforced as the programmers suspected "Acid Head" was in support of recreational drug use. Speaking on the issue in an interview, guitarist Randy "Jimmy James" Bowles said "Not having it played on radio stations definitely hurt sales, because the song remained unheard by the masses. Our potential best song was thrown away! When it did sell was after all but Georgy were left, unfairly, ineligible for compensation".

Nonetheless, "Acid Head" has since been rediscovered on several bootleg and compilation albums. Explaining the composition's favor among garage rock enthusiasts, Bowles points to the song's "haunting sound of the Vox Continental organ, the almost raga-sounding droning guitar, played through a Vox Super Beatle. The eastern-sounding sax. The almost-military tattoo of the drum. The slightly out-of-tune instruments", which he wrote, create a "unique sonic foundation over which the story unfolds". The song was first reissued on the unofficial album Acid Dreams in 1979. Additional appearances include 60s Punk Sampler, Volume 2, Acid Dreams Testament, and Psychedelic Unknowns, Volume 5. It was also prominently featured on the Nuggets compilation, Where the Action Is! Los Angeles Nuggets: 1965-1968, after Bowles paved the way for the song's inclusion. In 2011, "Acid Head" became the opening track to an album of the same name, which compiles all the Velvet Illusions' released material. Another similar album, released on vinyl, called Velvet Illusions also features the tune.
