= Mirror (Emitt Rhodes album) =

Studio album by Emitt Rhodes
- Released: 21 July 1971
- Recorded: 1971
- Genre: Rock, power pop
- Label: Dunhill
- Producer: Emitt Rhodes

Emitt Rhodes chronology
Emitt Rhodes (1970)	Mirror (1971)	Farewell to Paradise (1973)

Professional ratings
Review scores
Source	Rating
Allmusic	4/5 stars

Mirror is the third solo album by Emitt Rhodes with a much heavier rock approach than the debut.

== Track listing ==
All songs composed and arranged by Emitt Rhodes.

Side one

1. "Birthday Lady" - 2:50
2. "Better Side of Life" - 2:37
3. "My Love Is Strong" - 2:39
4. "Side We Seldom Show" - 2:26
5. "Mirror" - 2:47

Side two

1. "Really Wanted You" - 2:42
2. Medley: "Bubble Gum the Blues" / "I'm a Cruiser" - 4:43
3. "Love Will Stone You" - 3:23
4. "Golden Child of God" - 2:43
5. "Take You Far Away" - 3:00

== Personnel ==
- Emitt Rhodes: All instruments and voices.
- Keith Olsen: Mixdown Engineer.
