= The Yellow Payges =

American rock band

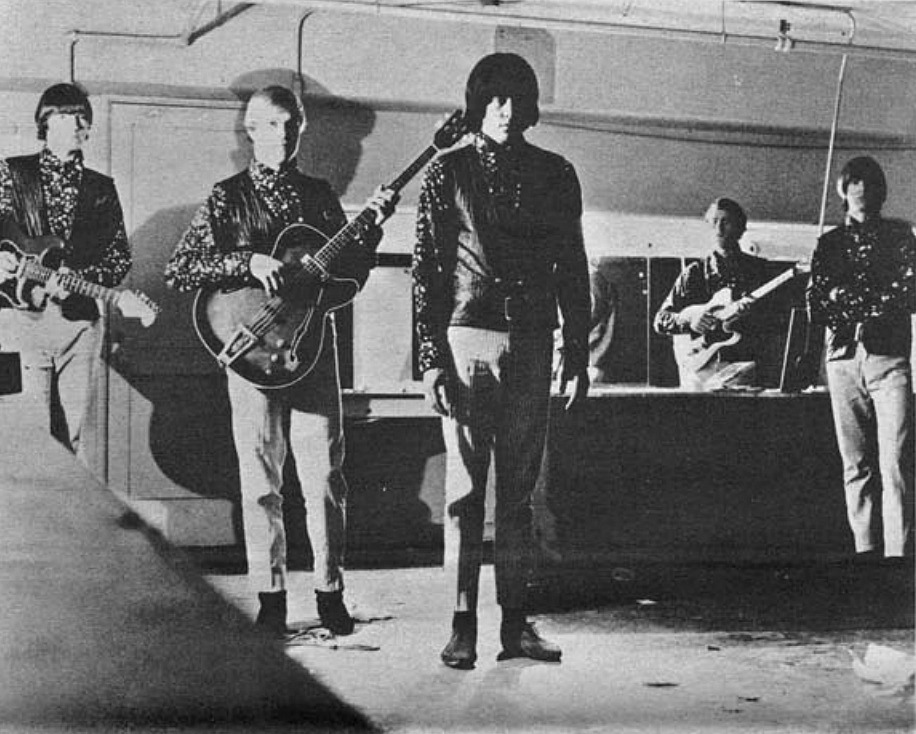
- Circa 1966

Background information
- Origin: Los Angeles, California, U.S.
- Genres: Rock and roll, garage rock, psychedelic rock
- Years active: 1966–1970, 2011–present
- Labels: Showplace, Uni
- Members: Danny Gorman; Dave Provost; George Keller
- Past members: Daniel Hortter; John Knox; Larry Tyre; Herby Ratzloff; Mike Rummans; Bob Norsoph; Randy Carlisle; Jim Lanham; Teddy Rooney; Bill Ham; Bob Barnes; Donnie Dacus; Mike Livingston; Ray Burke

The Yellow Payges is an American rock band, led by singer Dan Hortter, that was formed in Los Angeles in 1966. Although their commercial success was limited, they toured widely and recorded ten singles and an LP before splitting up in 1970.

== History ==
The band was formed by singer Dan Hortter in Los Angeles in April 1966. Hortter had been a member of a Torrance-based surf rock band, the Driftones, who had just split up. At a performance by his friends in another band, the Palace Guard (whose drummer was Emitt Rhodes), at the Hullabaloo club in Hollywood, he joined the group onstage to play harmonica and sing "I'm a Man". His performance so impressed club owner Gary Bookasta that he invited Hortter to bring his own band to support The Newbeats two weeks later. Hortter recruited guitarists John Knox and Larry Tyre, bassist Herby Ratzloff, and drummer Terry Rae (formerly of the Driftones) to play the gig. Rae was then replaced by Dan Gorman, and the group changed its name to become The Yellow Payges.

They began playing regularly at the Hullabaloo, and Bookasta became their manager. There were further personnel changes. Knox and Tyre left and were replaced by Bob Norsoph and Randy Carlisle; and Mike Rummans replaced Ratzloff. When Norsoph and Carlisle themselves left, Rummans moved to guitar and Jim Lanham came in on bass; he was soon replaced in turn by Teddy Rooney, the son of actor Mickey Rooney. In 1967, the group released their debut single, "Never See the Good in Me" on the Showplace label, a subsidiary of Cameo-Parkway Records. Its local success, together with that of follow-up "Jezebel", resulted in the band signing with Uni Records. They released the single "Our Time Is Running Out", and the group toured the US as part of Dick Clark's Happening '67 package tour of 45 cities in 45 days.

Rummans and Rooney left the band in mid-1968, and were replaced by Bill Ham and Bob Barnes, both from Fort Worth, Texas. Rummans formed a new group, Salt and Pepper, with Rick James, Greg Reeves, and others. The Yellow Payges – now comprising Hortter (lead vocals, harmonica), Ham (lead guitar), Barnes (bass) and Gorman (drums) – continued to release singles, and played the Hollywood Bowl as support to Eric Burdon and the Animals, the Rascals, and Tommy James and the Shondells. They also toured for several months as support for The Animals before undertaking a similar role opening for The Beach Boys. Other bands with whom the group shared a stage included Buffalo Springfield, the Doors, Pink Floyd, the Byrds, the Grateful Dead, and Jefferson Airplane. The Yellow Payges recorded the LP Vol. 1, released by UNI in mid-1969, and issued several singles including one of their best remembered songs, "Vanilla on My Mind", and a remake of "I'm a Man" which narrowly failed to reach the Billboard Hot 100. They also appeared on numerous regional television shows across the US, and on American Bandstand. Donnie Dacus briefly replaced Ham on lead guitar in 1969.

The band made an appearance on an episode of the NBC TV series The Name of the Game entitled "Jenny Wilde is Drowning" on which they performed "Follow the Bouncing Ball," released as a single in 1970.

The group were then hired to appear in a series of commercials for AT&T's Yellow Pages, which, according to writer Jason Ankeny at Allmusic, "effectively destroy[ed] their credibility and their momentum". According to Hortter, "We were put in these hideous yellow satin ruffled shirts with black velvet pants, and did these ridiculous commercials. It pretty much destroyed everything we worked so hard to accomplish." The group broke up in late 1970, during the recording of their second LP.

== Later activities ==
Bob Barnes, under the pseudonym Roscoe West, later collaborated with both Kinky Friedman and T-Bone Burnett. Hortter signed a solo contract with Uni, but no material was released. He later developed a successful career in high tech industry.

The Yellow Payges Vol.1 was reissued on CD in 2006.

The Yellow Payges reunited in 2011, with Daniel Hortter, Danny Gorman, Mike Rummans, and new members Dave Provost and Mike Livingston. In 2019, Daniel Hortter, Danny Gorman and Dave Provost recruited guitarist George Keller, and the group continues to perform select shows with the likes of the Association and the Yardbirds.

Teddy Rooney died on July 2, 2016, aged 66. Daniel Hortter died on February 2, 2022.

== Discography ==
=== Albums ===
- Volume 1 (March 1969, UNI 73045)

Side One

1. The Two Of Us
2. Little Woman
3. Friends
4. Boogie Woogie Baby
5. Crowd Pleaser

Side Two

1. Moonfire
2. Devil Woman
3. Never Put Away My Love For You
4. I'm A Man/Here 'Tis

=== Singles ===
- Never See The Good In Me b/w Sleeping Minds (April 1967, Showplace WS-216)
- Jezebel b/w We Got A Good Love In The Makin' (June 1967, Showplace WS-217)
- Our Time Is Running Out b/w Sweet Sunrise (December 1967, UNI 55043)
- Childhood Friends b/w Judge Carter (June 1968, UNI 55047)
- Crowd Pleaser b/w You're Just What I Was Looking For Today (October 1968, UNI 55089)
- Never Put Away My Love For You b/w The Two Of Us (February 1969, UNI 55107)
- Vanilla On My Mind b/w Would You Mind If I Loved You (September 1969, UNI 55135)
- Slow Down b/w Frisco Annie (November 1969, UNI 55176)
- Follow The Bouncing Ball b/w Little Woman (December 1969, UNI 55192)
- I'm A Man b/w Home Again (April 1970, UNI 55225)
