= Teddy and His Patches =

American garage rock band

Background information
- Origin: San Jose, California, United States
- Genres: Garage rock; psychedelic rock
- Years active: 1964 - 1967
- Labels: Chance
- Past members: Teddy Flores; Bernard Pearson; David Conway; Steve "Herbie" Urbani; Steve Marley

Teddy and His Patches were an American garage rock band formed in San Jose, California in 1964. The group, for the greater duration of its existence, was rather straightforward in their musical style; however, their best-known recording, "Suzy Creamcheese", exemplifies some of the odder aspects of psychedelia. The song was a regional hit and has since achieved favor among psychedelic music enthusiasts, who rediscovered the composition through several compilation albums.

== History ==
Initially formed by Teddy Flores (lead vocals, harmonica) in 1964, the first incarnation of the band—a Motown-influenced group—was received with only local notice until Flores decided to reshuffle the line-up and its musical style in 1966. Flores' new group included Bernard Pearson (lead guitar), David Conway (keyboards), Steve "Herbie" Urbani (bass guitar), and Steve Marley (drums). The name, Teddy and His Patches, was derived from the eye patch Flores wore as a result of losing his left eye to complications caused by cancer. The band soon garnered a large following in the burgeoning San Jose rock scene, performing regularly at the Cocoanut Grove, the Continental Ballroom, and a small club known as Loser's South. Much of Teddy and His Patches' live setlist was taken from the Yardbirds and the Animals, though Marley also recalls a wide-variety of musical interests ranging from psychedelia, to Roy Orbison, and the post-Rubber Soul Beatles.

In November 1966, the band was given the opportunity to record for Chance Records. The label was spearheaded by local record producer Grady O'Neal, who owed Conway and Marley for the various odd jobs they performed at TIKI Studios. As home to country and Western musicians, at first the record label was apprehensive to signing a young group experimenting with psychedelic music. However, musical tastes aside, the label was more conscientious of Teddy and His Patches' growing following in San Jose.

Recording sessions generated two tracks, including "Suzy Creamcheese", a bizarre tune written by Conway and promoter Jerry Ralston. The song was inspired by the opening dialogue—which "Suzy Creamcheese" features Flores mysteriously reciting—taken from the Frank Zappa composition "The Return of the Son of Monster Magnet". On the tune's raw fidelity, Marley recalls, "[t]he psychedelic whoops heard on the track were part of the live recording, with Teddy moving from a studio mic to a hand-held PA mic that was plugged into an old Fender tape-loop echo feeding back through a PA monitor. The whole thing was recorded without a single overdub or edit...and in just three or four takes total". Chance Records issued "Suzy Creamcheese" and "From Day to Day" as Teddy and His Patches' debut single in February 1967, with the release reaching number one in San Jose. The single opened new opportunities for the band, such as becoming the opening act for more prominent groups including the Doors and Moby Grape.

Another single, the gloomy "Haight-Ashbury", also had some success in San Jose; however, neither "Suzy Creamcheese" or their follow-up managed to breakthrough nationally. According to various accounts by the band members, five to ten additional songs were recorded in a more conventional 8-track studio, but were never released because their two singles failed to reach the Billboard Hot 100. Urbani and Marley also both speculate that the master tapes still survive, since the group's released material is featured on several compilation albums. Following financial disagreements and departures of key members, Teddy and His Patches disbanded in late-1967.

Since its initial distribution, "Suzy Creamcheese" has been compiled on numerous albums including Pebbles, Volume 3, Acid Dreams, and Love Is the Song We Sing: San Francisco Nuggets 1965–1970, among several others. "From Day to Day" is found on Sixties Rebellion, Volume 6 and Victims of Circumstances, Volume 2 and "Haight-Ashbury" is featured on 60s Punk Sampler, Volume 2, Boulders, Volume 2, and A Heavy Dose of Lyte Psych.

== Discography ==
=== Singles ===
- "Suzy Creamcheese" b/w "From Day to Day" - Chance Records (668), 1967
- "Haight-Ashbury" b/w "It Ain't Nothing" - Chance Records (669), 1967
