= The Merry-Go-Round (album) =

Studio album by the Merry-Go-Round
- Released: September 1967
- Label: A&M
- Producer: Larry Marks

The Merry-Go-Round is the only album by 1960s pop group the Merry-Go-Round. It was released in the United States in September 1967.

== History ==
Soon afterward bass player Bill Rinehart departed, and was replaced by Rick Dey of the Vejtables. Several further singles, including "She Laughed Loud"/"Had to Run Around", "Come Ride, Come Ride"/"She Laughed Loud", "Listen, Listen!"/"Missing You" and "'Til the Day After"/"Highway", were released in 1967 and 1968 but failed to chart. After fan interest in the group dissipated, they decided to disband in 1969.

Singer Emitt Rhodes was the main songwriter for the group, writing or co-writing eleven of the twelve songs on their only album. Rhodes went on to produce four solo albums from 1970 to 1973, and one last album in 2016.

== Chart performance ==
The album debuted on Billboard magazine's Top LP's chart in the issue dated November 18, 1967, peaking at No. 190 during a two-week run on the chart. The LP included three singles, two of which reached the Billboard Hot 100.

== Track listing ==
All songs are written by Emitt Rhodes except where noted.

Side one

1. "Live" – 2:32
2. "Time Will Show the Wiser" – 2:25
3. "On Your Way Out" – 2:29
4. "Gonna Fight the War" – 2:00
5. "Had to Run Around" – 3:34
6. "We're in Love" – 2:22

Side two

1. "You're a Very Lovely Woman" – 2:45
2. "Where Have You Been All My Life" – 2:14
3. "Early in the Morning" – 2:05
4. "Low Down" (Gary Kato) – 2:57
5. "A Clown's No Good" – 2:18
6. "Gonna Leave You Alone" (Rhodes, Kato) – 2:16

=== Listen, Listen: The Definitive Collection ===
On November 8, 2006, Rev-Ola re-released the stereo version of the original 12-track album along with Rhodes' 1970 debut solo album, The American Dream (tracks 13 thru 24), as Listen, Listen: The Definitive Collection, with six bonus tracks for 30 tracks total, the last track being a hidden track. The reissue compiles all of the Merry-Go-Round's material except the mono mix of "The Merry-Go-Round" and the single mixes of "Come Ride, Come Ride" and "'Til the Day After".

Bonus tracks (Emitt Rhodes)

13. "Mother Earth"
14. "Pardon Me"
15. "Textile Factory"
16. "Someone Died"
17. "Come Ride, Come Ride"
18. "Let's All Sing"
19. "Holly Park"
20. "Mary Will You Take My Hand"
21. "The Man He Was"
22. "In The Days Of Old"
23. "'Til The Day After"
24. "Saturday Night"

Bonus tracks (The Merry-Go-Round)

25. "She Laughed Loud"
26. "Listen, Listen!"
27. "Missing You" (Larry Marks)
28. "Highway" (Kato, Joel Larson)
29. "Time Will Show the Wiser" (Mono 45)
30. "California Girls" (hidden track)

== Charts ==
=== Album ===
Chart (1967)	Peak position
US Billboard Top LPs	190

=== Singles ===
- "Live" (1967) - US Billboard Hot 100 #63
- "Time Will Show the Wiser" (1967)
- "You're a Very Lovely Woman" (1967) - US Billboard Hot 100 #94
