= Jay David Saks =

American music producer (1945–2024)

Jay David Saks (24 January 1945 – 16 November 2024) was an American music producer.

== Biography ==
Born in New York City, Saks grew up in The Bronx. His older sister was the cellist Toby Saks. He studied at the Juilliard School, and later continued his studies at the Mannes College of Music, from which he graduated in 1970. During the 1960s, Saks played bass guitar with The Balloon Farm.

Saks joined Columbia Masterworks in 1972. In 1974, he moved to RCA Records, and served as an executive producer at RCA Victor (later Sony BMG) from 1974 to 2005. Saks was the recipient of 13 Grammy Awards from a total of 53 nominations, and 2 Emmy Awards for his work on Broadway recordings, classical music, and the Metropolitan Opera.

Saks joined the Metropolitan Opera staff in 1979. For the company, he worked as a sound designer and engineer on radio broadcasts, television presentations, and the Metropolitan Opera Live in HD cinema satellite transmission series. Of his 13 Grammy Awards, four of them were for his Metropolitan Opera work. Saks retired from the Metropolitan Opera in 2019.

Saks married Linda Nathan in 1972. The couple had two sons, Jeremy and Greg. Their marriage lasted until Saks' death on 16 November 2024, from Parkinsonism-related causes. His widow, their two sons, and their three grandchildren survive him.
