= Rainbow Ends =

Studio album by Emitt Rhodes
- Released: 26 February 2016
- Genre: Soft rock, pop rock
- Label: Omnivore Recordings
- Producer: Chris Price

Emitt Rhodes chronology
Farewell to Paradise (1973)	Rainbow Ends (2016)

Professional ratings
Review scores
Source	Rating
AllMusic	4/5 stars

Rainbow Ends is the fifth and final studio album by Emitt Rhodes. It was released on 26 February 2016, some 43 years after his previous album, Farewell to Paradise.

== Background ==
The album was initiated by a visit from Chris Price, who had visited Rhodes' recording studios. He learned that Rhodes kept song ideas in manila envelopes, which among other things consisted of lead sheets, multiple lyric drafts, and an audio recording of the composition. Upon hearing some of these demos, Price encouraged Rhodes to finish and release them. It features contributions from Roger Joseph Manning, Jr., Jason Falkner, Nels Cline, Aimee Mann, Jon Brion, Susanna Hoffs, Bleu, Fernando Perdomo and members of Brian Wilson’s band. Falkner and Manning recorded seven songs with Rhodes in one recording session. Rhodes commented that he was unable to sing any falsetto parts on the album, so he instead focused on optimising his vocal delivery.

The first single, "Dog on a Chain", featuring harmonies by Mann and a solo by Brion was premiered by The Wall Street Journal's blog Speakeasy in November 2015.

== Release and reception ==
Rainbow Ends has received positive reviews. On the aggregate website Metacritic, the album has received a score of 81 out of a possible 100 with five reviews, indicating "universal acclaim". Mark Deming of AllMusic says it is "a mature, introspective work from a man looking for answers to the questions of life and love, and it's a brave and genuinely impressive return to the spotlight from a major talent." Hal Horowitz of American Songwriter wrote that the songs on the album are "just a notch below Rhodes’ earlier work and may yet become as well-regarded as those songs." In a 7 out of 10 review for Uncut, Rob Hughes writes that the album "Rainbow Ends is an intensely personal vision. Indeed, it feels more like a companion piece to his great ’70s work than it does a postscript ..... if it occasionally lapses into self-pity, there’s also a confessional aspect that feels unnervingly candid."

Rainbow Ends debuted on the Billboard 200 at No. 150 for the week of March 19, 2016. It also placed at number 27 on the Independent Albums chart and number 46 on the Top Internet Albums chart. It is Rhodes' first charting album since 1971's Mirror, as his following album, 1973's Farewell To Paradise, never charted.

== Track listing ==
All songs composed by Emitt Rhodes except when otherwise indicated.

No.	Title	Writer(s)	Length
1.	"Dog on a Chain"
2.	"If I Knew Then"
3.	"Isn't It So"
4.	"This Wall Between Us"	Rhodes, Dan Mayer, Matt Malley, Jim Rolfe
5.	"Someone Else"	Rhodes, Chris Price
6.	"I Can't Tell My Heart"
7.	"Put Some Rhythm to It"
8.	"It's All Behind Us Now"
9.	"What’s a Man to Do"	Rhodes, Mayer, Malley, Rolfe
10.	"Friday’s Love"
11.	"Rainbow Ends"
