= The Caretakers of Deception =

American garage rock band

- Origin: Los Angeles, California, United States
- Genres: Garage rock; psychedelic rock
- Years active: 1966 - 1967
- Labels: Sanctus

The Caretakers of Deception were an American garage rock band formed in Los Angeles, California, in 1966. Very little is known about the group itself, but their lone single "Cuttin' Grass" which was first noticed on the Psychedelic Disaster Whirl compilation album, is heralded as a classic of the 1960s garage rock era.

The Caretakers of Deception were formed by Thomas Charles Jones, a Los Angeles songwriter, when he was 17 years old. Nothing is known regarding the identities of the group's members themselves but Jones was the band's leader and primary songwriter. On his behalf, the band performed at local clubs that were a part of the city's psychedelic music scene such as the Seawitch and Brave New World. In 1967, Jones was approached by talent agent Larry Miller to record the Caretakers of Deception at a home studio in Topanga Hills. The group completed and released two Jones originals (who is credited as T. Jones on the single) "Cuttin' Grass" and "X + Y = 13" on Sanctus Records; the Caretakers of Deception disbanded soon after.

Although the "Cuttin' Grass" single did not create much interest outside Los Angeles, it received more attention when it was reissued on the Psychedelic Disaster Whirl compilation album in 1986. As "Cuttin' Grass" experienced a revival of interest, it has been acknowledged as a classic. In the UK, critic Dave Furgess, writing for the Head Heritage website, described the record as "one of the top 10 greatest USA 60's garage records of all time, right up there with classics by The Dovers, The Squires, Third Bardo, Human Expression and Calico Wall".
