= The Painted Faces =

American garage/psychedelic rock band

Background information
- Origin: Fort Myers, Florida, United States
- Genres: Garage rock; psychedelic rock
- Years active: 1967-1970
- Labels: Qualicon, Manhattan
- Past members: Jack O'Neill; John McKinney; Jerry Turano; Craig Guild; Harry Bragg; George Schule

The Painted Faces were an American garage and psychedelic rock band from Fort Myers, Florida, who were active from 1967 through 1969, and were not only popular in Florida but achieved a following outside of their own region by playing regular shows in New York City and elsewhere. After disbanding they became practically unknown for a number of years. But since the 1980s, with the reissue their songs on various compilations, they have come to the attention of garage rock and psychedelic devotees. They are known for songs such as "Anxious Color", which Mojo magazine named one of the top 100 psychedelic songs of all time.

== History ==
The Painted Faces were formed in 1967 under the original name of the Fifth Dimension. Their original lineup consisted of Jack O'Neill (vocals), Jerry Turano (lead guitar), Harry Bragg (drums), John McKinney (rhythm guitar) and Craig Guild (bass). Later that year, under this configuration, they recorded several demos at Qualicon Studios in Naples, Florida which consisted of a Crown 2- track recorder in a garage, from which their first single, "Things We See" b/w "I Want You" would be selected for release on Qualicon Records in April 1967. Before the single was released, Craig Guild departed and John McKinney temporarily switched to bass until a replacement could be found. "Things We See" was released in April 1967 on Qualicon Records which was owned by producer Walter Fredrickson, who had close ties with Mike Curb of Sidewalk Productions.

Through the Curb/Sidewalk connection, the group signed with Manhattan Records which was operated by Curb's publishing company, Mirby Music. Eventually the band changed its name to the Painted Faces, inspired by William Golding's Lord of the Flies. Their first single to be released on Manhattan, "Anxious Color" became a popular hit in south Florida topping the charts four consecutive weeks, gaining airplay on local and national radio stations. After the single was released, George Schule joined as the band new bass player, and John McKinney returned to rhythm guitar. With this line-up the band recorded the follow-up, "I Think I'm Going Mad" b/w "I Lost You In My Mind".

The record company received complaints from disc jockeys about perceived drug references in a couple of the songs released on the 45s. Consequently, "I Lost You In My Mind" never received much airplay outside of south Florida. Nonetheless, Painted Faces were beginning to land better gigs and often traveled to New York City. The parents of Jerry Turano and John McKinney objected the excursions to New York and convinced their sons to leave the band to pursue careers outside of music. They were replaced by other musicians, but the core of the band remained with Jack O'Neill, George Schule and Harry Bragg. The group became popular in Greenwich Village clubs such as Cafe Wha?, whose manager sent them to Puerto Rico to do a two-week residency at popular nightspot, the Jet Set. From here they landed a gig at Creque Alley in St. Thomas in the Virgin Islands, where The Mamas & Papas had performed. At the end of 1967, the Painted Faces released another Manhattan single, "In the Heat of the Night" b/w "Don't Say She's Gone".

Upon returning to New York City, popular New Jersey band The Critters expressed interest in recording a new Painted Faces song, "Girl, You're Growing Up", but the Painted Faces decided to record it themselves for a single to be released on the Sidewalk label, which never came out. Around this time that the group recorded an entire album worth of material to be released as an LP on Sidewalk, which included cover versions of "The Letter", "Brown Eyed Girl" and "Incense & Peppermints", however the album never got beyond the acetate stage and was shelved. The Painted Faces recorded several original songs that year, such as "Hard Life", "Lady", "Black Hearted Susan" and did their own arrangement of "Play With Fire" played in 7/4 time. They recorded several Bee Gees songs, including "Birdie Told Me", which was intended to be released as a single in the summer of '68.

As was the case with countless American bands of the era, the Vietnam War led to the ultimate demise of the group, when drummer Harry Bragg was drafted into combat. Without his services the group fell into disarray and disbanded in 1969. The Painted Faces faded into obscurity until some of their songs began to appear on garage compilations in the early 1980s. Their work was anthologized on the compilation Anxious Color, released in 1994 on Distortions Records. Mojo magazine named "Anxious Color" as one of the "100 Greatest Classics" of psychedelia.

== Membership ==
- Jack O'Neill (vocals)
- John McKinney (rhythm guitar, bass)
- Jerry Turano (lead guitar)
- Craig Guild (bass)
- Harry Bragg (drums)
- George Schule (bass)

== Discography ==
- "Things We See" b/w "I Want You" (Qualicon 5002; April, 1967)
- "Anxious Color" b/w "Things We See" (Manhattan 808; June, 1967)
- "I Think I'm Going Mad" b/w "I Lost You in My Mind" (Manhattan 811; September, 1967)
- "In the Heat of the Night" b/w "Don't Say She's Gone" (Manhattan 814; December, 1967)
