= Don Grady =

American actor and musician (1944–2012)

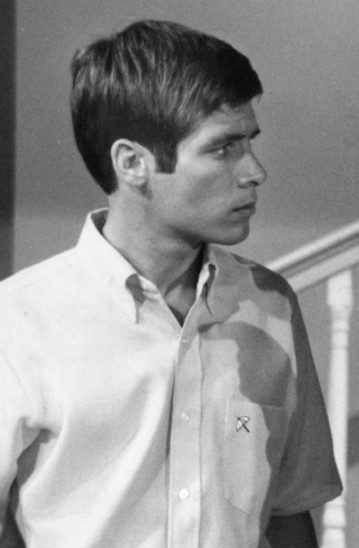
- Grady in My Three Sons, 1969
- Born: Don Louis Agrati; June 8, 1944; San Diego, California, U.S.
- Died: June 27, 2012 (aged 68); Thousand Oaks, California, U.S.
- Occupations: Actor; musician; composer
- Years active: 1954–2006
- Notable work: Mouseketeer on The Mickey Mouse Club, My Three Sons
- Spouse(s): Julie Boonisar (m. 1976–1979) (divorced), Virginia Lewsader (m. 1985)

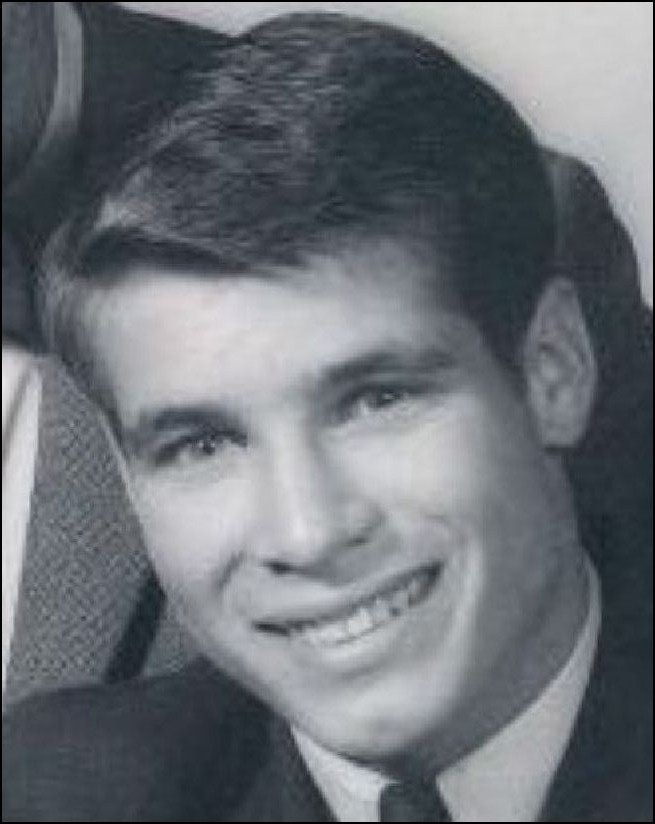
Don Grady (1962)

Don Grady (born Don Louis Agrati; June 8, 1944 – June 27, 2012) was an American actor and musician. He was best known as one of the Mouseketeers on the Mickey Mouse Club, and as Robbie Douglas on the long-running ABC / CBS television series My Three Sons. During his career in music he was a solo singer and the drummer for the pop band The Yellow Balloon.

== Life and career ==
Grady was born Don Louis Agrati in San Diego, California, the son of Mary B. (née Castellino), a talent agent, and Lou Anthony Agrati, a sausage maker. His sister Lanita became an actress known professionally as Lani O'Grady. He grew up in Lafayette, California, before being signed by Walt Disney and leaving the town. He graduated from Burbank High School in 1962.

=== Early career ===
His early acting credits include roles in Western series such as John Payne's The Restless Gun, Have Gun – Will Travel, Buckskin, Wagon Train and The Rifleman, in which he played two roles in the second season. He played Jeff, son of a barber that got into fights with Mark McCain (Lucas' son). This episode is called "The Patsy" and originally aired September 29, 1959.

In December 1959, at the age of 15, Grady appeared in two episodes of CBS's Dick Powell's Zane Grey Theatre, playing opposite Joan Crawford and Dick Powell.

In "Rebel Ranger", he was cast as Rob Faring, the young son of Crawford's character, Stella Faring, a Confederate widow who tries to reclaim her former home and Rob's birthplace from the Unionist owner, Cass Taggart, played by Scott Forbes. John Anderson is cast as Fisk Madden, who tries to drive Taggart off his land and gain Stella's favor. The episode ends with Stella and Rob heading into a nearby town with the understanding that Taggart would call upon Stella for possible courtship, even though Crawford was fifteen years Forbes' senior. Stella Faring reveals that she had been living in San Antonio, Texas, during the war, also the birthplace of Joan Crawford.

In "Death in a Wood", Grady played a young Unionist, Zachary, who grows to understand that a Confederate soldier, Lawrence (played by Dick Powell), who is holding him prisoner, is a man of decency and strength of commitment. Simon Oakland appeared in this episode as a less sympathetic Confederate named Townsend.

=== My Three Sons ===
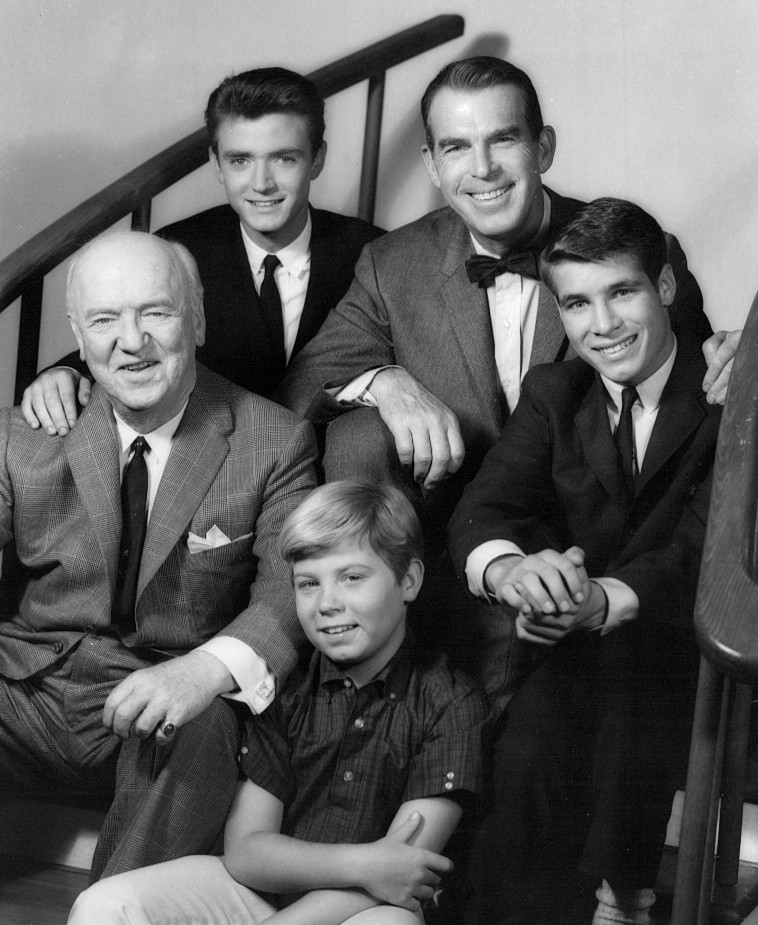
Clockwise from left: William Frawley, Tim Considine, Fred MacMurray, Grady, and Stanley Livingston on My Three Sons (1962)

In 1960, he began an 11-year run as Robbie Douglas in the show My Three Sons starring Fred MacMurray. Initially airing on ABC, the show moved to CBS in 1965.

During production of My Three Sons, Grady appeared with his own band The Greefs on the series, writing two original songs for the show ("A Good Man to Have Around the House" and "Leaving It Up to You"), recorded a single with the Palace Guard ("Little People" b/w "Summertime Game") in 1966, and was the drummer for The Yellow Balloon, whose self-titled song became a minor hit in 1967. For a while during the run of the series, he attended Los Angeles City College.

While on My Three Sons Grady also appeared in the NBC medical drama The Eleventh Hour, and The F.B.I. (Season 6, episode 11) as well as two episodes of the NBC education drama Mr. Novak, starring James Franciscus.

Originally the frustrated middle brother on My Three Sons, Grady's role of Robbie became that of the confident eldest brother with two cast changes. The character of the original oldest brother, Mike (played by Tim Considine, who had earlier appeared with Grady in The New Adventures of Spin and Marty), was gradually eased out of the series, and a new youngest son, Ernie (Barry Livingston), was adopted into the family.

=== Later career ===
At the end of 1970, Grady said he would "cut the umbilical cord" and leave My Three Sons after 11 years. He said, "I don't even know that acting is where my head is" and that "Robbie is something you do automatically like putting on your clothes. It's got no challenge." Grady had served in the United States Army Reserve for four years.

After leaving My Three Sons, Grady continued his musical career. His works included music for the Blake Edwards comedy film Switch, the theme song for The Phil Donahue Show and for EFX, a Las Vegas multimedia stage show starring Michael Crawford, David Cassidy, Tommy Tune, and Rick Springfield. As a stage performer he starred in a national tour of Pippin, and had roles in Godspell and Damn Yankees.

In 2008, Grady released Boomer: JazRokPop, a collection of songs written for and about the baby boom generation. It was his first original album as an artist since Homegrown was released by Elektra Records in 1973.

== Personal life and death ==
Grady's parents were divorced by the time he joined My Three Sons; he stated later that Fred MacMurray and show producers Don Fedderson and Ed Hartmann were the "father figures I needed."

Grady's first marriage to Julie Boonisar ended in divorce in 1979. The couple had no children. Grady married Virginia "Ginny" Lewsader in 1985, having met her at Disneyland. The couple had two children, Joey and Tessa, and remained married for 27 years, until Grady's death on June 27, 2012. He died of myeloma at age 68 in Thousand Oaks, California, and is buried at the Pierce Brothers Valley Oaks Memorial Park in Westlake Village, California.

== Filmography ==
| Year | Title | Role | Notes |
|---|---|---|---|
| 1958 | The Restless Gun | | Episode "No Way to Kill" |
| 1959 | The Restless Gun | | Episode "Madame Brimstone" |
| 1959 | The Restless Gun | | Episode "The Cavis Boy" |
| 1959 | The Rifleman | Jeff | Season 2, episode 1 |
| 1960 | Wagon Train | George | Episode "The Christine Elliott Story", Season 3, episode 24 |
| 1960 | The Rifleman | | Season 2, episode 22 |
| 1960 | Cash McCall | Boy at Airfield | Uncredited |
| 1960 | Ma Barker's Killer Brood | Herman - as a Boy | |
| 1960 | The Crowded Sky | Peter | Uncredited |
| 1960 | Have Gun, Will Travel | Lawson | Season 4, episode 6 |
| 1975 | The Wild McCullochs | R.J. McCulloch | |
