= Live (The Merry-Go-Round song) =

Single by the Merry-Go-Round

from the album The Merry-Go-Round
- B-side: "Time Will Show the Wiser"
- Released: 1967
- Genre: Baroque pop
- Length: 2:33
- Label: A&M Records
- Songwriter: Emitt Rhodes

The Merry-Go-Round singles chronology
"Live" (1967)	"You're a Very Lovely Woman" (1967)

"Live" is a song by the American rock band the Merry-Go-Round, written by band member Emitt Rhodes for their only album, The Merry-Go-Round (1967).

== Release ==
"Live" was the Merry-Go-Round's highest charting single, and peaked at #63 on the Billboard Hot 100 in the spring of 1967. The song was recorded by The Bangles for their debut album All Over the Place in 1984.
