= Yellow Balloon =

- Cover of the 1967 French single

Single by the Yellow Balloon

from the album The Yellow Balloon
- B-side: "Noollab Wolley"
- Released: February 1967
- Genre: Sunshine pop; psychedelia
- Length: 2:16
- Label: Canterbury
- Songwriter: Gary Zekley
- Producer: Yodar Critch

"Yellow Balloon" was a song by the Yellow Balloon, included on the group's 1967 self-titled album. It was classified as being in the sunshine pop genre.

== Music and lyrics ==
In late 1966, when Dean Torrence of Jan & Dean needed some songs for a new album, he enlisted the help of Gary Zekley, a talented Los Angeles singer/songwriter/producer Torrence had worked with previously. One of the songs Zekley gave Torrence was called "Yellow Balloon" and Torrence went on to record it. In the Torrence version, The last two lines in the bridge section of the song did not exist until after the recording was done. Those two lines from the bridge section were used in the Yellow Balloon's version of the song. The added lyrics are: "I know the sky's gonna get lighter/The sun's gonna shine a little brighter". The song is noted for its key change from F to G. The song is also noted for its change of time signature from 4/4 to 6/8 in the wordless verse with the "BA BAs", until it reverts to the 4/4 rhythm for the final repeated chorus, before the fade-out of the song.

Zekley was proud of the song, but was unenthused about Torrence's recording, so Zekley shopped the song to different labels. Among those whom Zekley visited was Ken Handler of Canterbury Records, who was very excited about the song and immediately set about having it recorded. Handler brought in noteworthy studio vocalists and musicians to add circular keyboard lines and a slight tremolo effect on the guitar. Mike Post played 12-string guitar.

== Release and aftermath ==
The single was released under the group name the Yellow Balloon, in direct competition with Torrence's version of the song. Fearing both failure and a lawsuit, Zekley produced the single under the pseudonym Yodar Critch. Meanwhile, Torrence's single was released under the duo's name Jan & Dean, even though Jan Berry was not on the recording, having been in a recent near-fatal car accident. The week of May 20, 1967, the Yellow Balloon's version placed at #25 on Billboard's Hot 100 chart, while Jan & Dean's version placed at #111. This was due largely to the fact that many disc jockeys around the United States played only the Yellow Balloon version of the song. The B-side was the song played backwards, titled "Noollab Wolley".

However, several radio stations banned the song in fear that the song was about yellow hallucinogenic pills for a drug trip, just like the Donovan song "Mellow Yellow".

The single generated enough fan interest for the band to make an album and to perform at various shows. The problem was that there was no actual Yellow Balloon band. Quickly, Handler elicited the help of Canterbury recording artist Don Grady, a former Mouseketeer, better known at the time as the character Robbie Douglas of the TV series My Three Sons. Grady knew several other musicians, and enlisted Alex Valdez (lead vocals), Paul Kanella (lead guitar), Don Braucht (bass guitar), Alan DeBoer, studio only (drums), and Forrest "Frosty" Green (keyboards) to record the self-titled album. Zekley produced the album and co-wrote eight of the eleven tracks.

The Yellow Balloon album has long been considered a sunshine pop classic, although "Yellow Balloon" is the only song that charted.
