= The Merry-Go-Round =

American psychedelic rock band

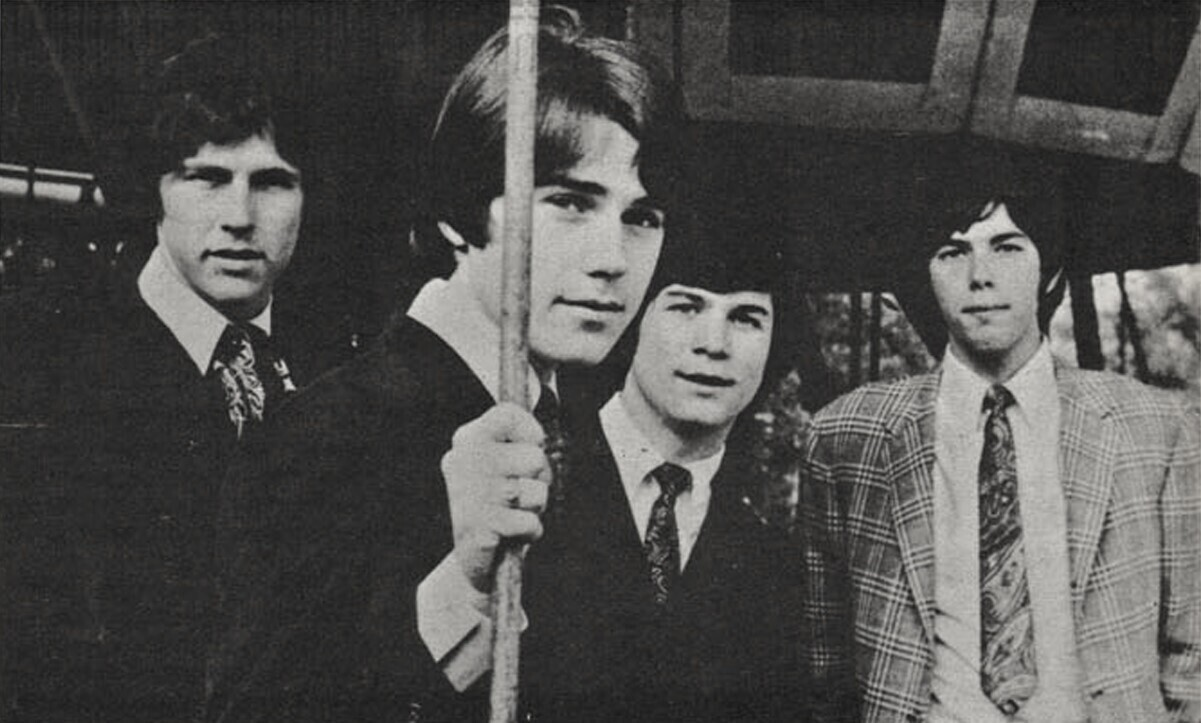
- Photographed in 1967. From left to right: Bill Rinehart, Emitt Rhodes, Gary Kato, Joel Larson

Background information
- Origin: Los Angeles, California, United States
- Genres: Baroque pop; psychedelic rock
- Years active: 1966–1969
- Label: A&M
- Past members: Bill Rinehart; Emitt Rhodes; Gary Kato; Joel Larson; Rick Dey

The Merry-Go-Round was an American psychedelic rock, Los Angeles–based band that included singer-songwriter Emitt Rhodes and featured Joel Larson on drums, Gary Kato on lead guitar, and Bill Rinehart on bass.

== History ==
The band formed in the summer of 1966. Emitt Rhodes had left his former band, the Palace Guard, and began jam sessions with Gary Kato and friends. Within weeks, they were joined by Bill Rinehart, formerly of the Leaves and Joel Larson, formerly of the Grass Roots.

Recorded demos resulted in the band being signed by A&M Records. By early 1967, the band released their first single, "Live"/"Time Will Show the Wiser". "Live" became popular in L.A. and reached number 63 on the Billboard Hot 100. The group's next single, "You're a Very Lovely Woman", highly arranged and orchestrated, only reached number 94. A&M, noticing the disappointing listing, hastily released their debut album before the window of opportunity closed.

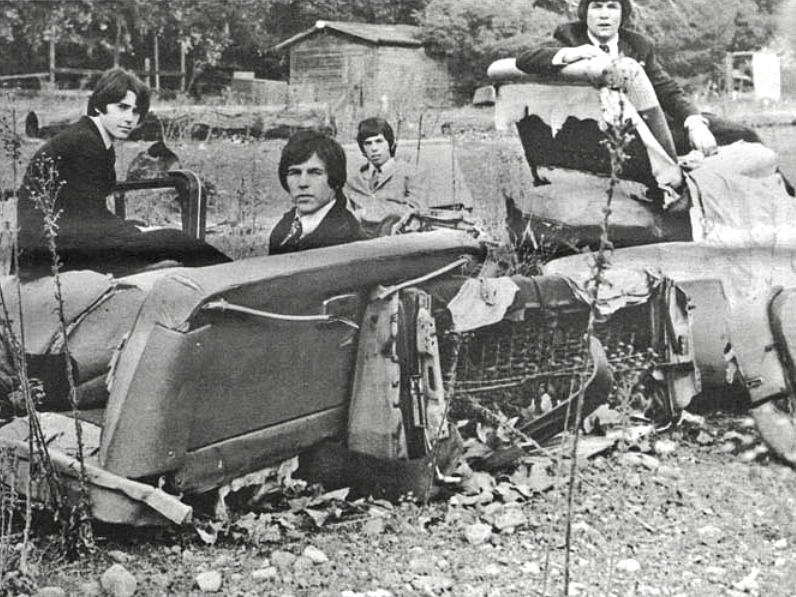
Promotional photo, 1967

The band released their only album, The Merry-Go-Round, in November 1967. It stalled, reaching only number 190, and soon after, Rinehart departed. He was replaced by Rick Dey of the Vejtables. Several further singles, including "She Laughed Loud"/"Had to Run Around", "Come Ride, Come Ride"/"She Laughed Loud", "Listen, Listen"/"Missing You" and "'Til the Day After"/"Highway", were released in 1967 and 1968 but failed to chart.

The Merry-Go-Round performed at the Fantasy Fair and Magic Mountain Music Festival in 1967 on both days of the music festival. They closed the show on Saturday, June 10 and were the second to the show closer on Sunday, June 11.

Three members of the group, Rick Dey, Emitt Rhodes, and Joel Larson appeared on The Dating Game in 1968 and the group performed "Live" during the intro to the show. They started work on a second album but never completed it. After fan interest in the group dissipated, they disbanded in 1969.

== Legacy ==
"You're a Very Lovely Woman" was covered in 1971 by Linda Ronstadt on Capitol single 3021 as "(She's A) Very Lovely Woman." Her version reached number 70 on the Billboard Hot 100.

The Bangles covered "Live" on their 1984 album All Over the Place. Fairport Convention recorded "Time Will Show the Wiser" on their debut album in 1968 and still play the song regularly at their Cropredy Festival.

A 14-song best-of album was released by Rhino Records in 1985.

A CD containing their only LP and other existing material was issued in 2005 on Rev-Ola Records. An unlisted hidden track, "California Girls", follows the regular CD tracks. It was used in a Herb Alpert promotional TV movie, Beat of the Brass. The trumpet section is played by Herb Alpert's Tijuana Brass.

Their only album was reissued in April 2010 by Sundazed Music, which was remastered from original analog tapes in high-quality vinyl.

Bassist Bill Rinehart died on April 18, 2017, aged 71.

== Discography ==
- The Merry-Go-Round (1967) – Billboard 200 No. 190

=== Singles ===
- "Live" (1967) – US Billboard Hot 100 No. 63; RPM Canada No. 66
- "Time Will Show the Wiser" (1967)
- "You're a Very Lovely Woman" – (1967) US Billboard Hot 100 No. 94
- "She Laughed Loud"
- "Listen, Listen"
- "'Til the Day After"
