= The Yellow Balloon (band) =

American sunshine pop band

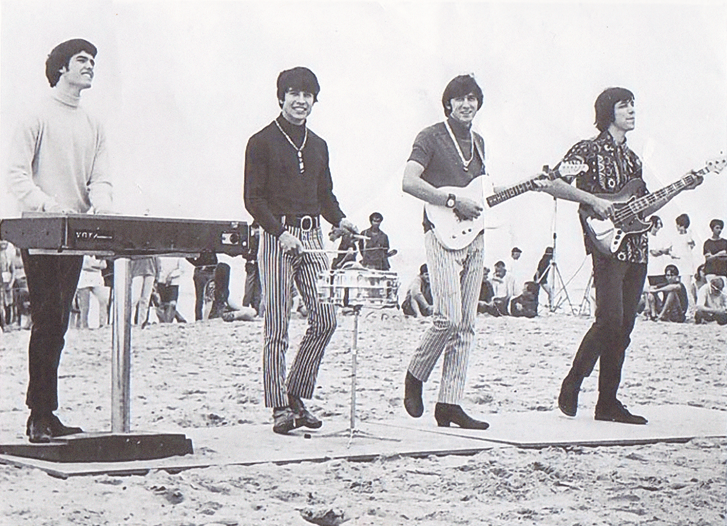
- The Yellow Balloon in 1967, Forrest Green (keyboards), Don Grady (drummer), Paul Canella (lead guitar), and Don Braucht (bass guitar)

Background information
- Origin: Los Angeles, California, United States
- Genres: Sunshine pop
- Years active: 1967
- Labels: Canterbury; Sundazed
- Past members: Alex Valdez; Daryl Dragon; Don Braucht; Don Grady; Forrest Green; Mark Andes; Paul Canella

The Yellow Balloon was an American sunshine pop band, formed in Los Angeles in 1967 by songwriter and producer Gary Zekley. The group is notable for featuring Don Grady as the drummer (sometimes billed as "Luke R. Yoo") of The Mickey Mouse Club and My Three Sons fame. Other band members hailed from Oregon and Arizona. They were led by Alex Valdez (lead singer), and included Forrest Green (keyboards), Don Braucht (bass guitar), and Paul Canella (lead guitar). The band at one time also included Daryl Dragon, later the male half of Captain & Tennille.

The Yellow Balloon released multiple singles, including their hit "Yellow Balloon" which peaked at #25 on the Billboard 100 Chart and "Good Feelin' Time," which peaked at #1 on the Bubbling Under Hot 100 extension chart. Both are taken from the group's debut album.

The band's 1967 self-titled LP was released through Canterbury Records and besides featuring the hit single "Yellow Balloon", also included two songs co-written by former The Mamas & the Papas singer Jill Gibson. The album was re-released in 1998 as a CD by Sundazed Music, including all eleven songs from the original album, a few songs Grady released as singles, a demo, and a Zekley recorded interview conducted by the music historian Domenic Priore.

The group disbanded soon after their first release, when further success eluded them. Band members felt they had nothing new to produce, so the breakup was amicable.

== Discography ==
1967: The Yellow Balloon
No.	Title	Length
1.	"How Can I Be Down"	2:14
2.	"Stained Glass Window"	2:03
3.	"Baby Baby It's You"	1:57
4.	"Panama Red"	1:39
5.	"I've Got a Feeling for Love"	2:18
6.	"Yellow Balloon"	2:16
7.	"Good Feelin' Time"	2:12
8.	"Follow the Sunshine"	2:35
9.	"Springtime Girl"	2:06
10.	"Can't Get Enough of Your Love"	2:16
11.	"Junk Maker Shoppe"	2:37
