= Candy Harlots =

Australian rock band

- Also known as: Helter Skelter; The Harlots
- Origin: Sydney, New South Wales, Australia
- Genres: Glam metal, glam rock, sleaze rock
- Years active: 1987–1995 (one-off reunion: 2009)
- Labels: Au Go Go; Timberyard; Virgin; EMI
- Past members: see Members list below

Candy Harlots were an Australian glam metal band from Sydney, active between 1987 and 1995. They also released material as Helter Skelter and The Harlots. According to rock music historian Ian McFarlane they were, "an unashamedly macho, decadent lot, with a black leathers 'n' chains and gutter-rock image played out over an entertaining brand of hard-edged rock 'n' roll." They enjoyed Top 20 chart success with their March 1992 EP Foreplay on the Australian Recording Industry Association (ARIA) Singles Chart and obtained a Top 40 chart position with their sole full-length album Five Wicked Ways in May 1992.

== History ==
Candy Harlots were formed in 1987 in Sydney by guitarist Ron Barrett (aka Ron B. Gypsy, ex-Glam Savages), drummer Tony Cardinal (ex-What??!!, Soggy Porridge), vocalist Mark Easton (ex-Suicide Squad, Kelpies, Soggy Porridge, Glam Savages) and bass guitarist Nick Szentkuti (ex-Glam Savages). Shortly after the band was formed, Easton met guitarist Marc De Hugar in Melbourne and invited him to join the group. Szentkuti spent six months as bass guitarist; he was followed by Scott Millard (ex-The Faith) and then Leeno Dee (ex-Roxx). The band developed an underground following around Sydney and were offered a recording deal with Virgin Records after three shows but their manager turned down the offer. The contract was not signed until the band's management deal expired four years later. They played frequently in suburban Sydney pubs, including the Kardomah Cafe in Kings Cross and the St James Tavern in the city, and secured support slots with The Cult, Cheap Trick, Divinyls, The Angels, The Sunnyboys, Danish rock band D-A-D and Kings of the Sun.

Although the band's popularity increased, they found it difficult to secure a major label contract. Melbourne label 'Au Go Go Records' issued their debut 7" single Red Hot Rocket in April 1989, with the initial 500 copies pressed on red vinyl and wrapped in a pair of women's lace knickers. The single was produced by Mick Cocks of hard-rockers Rose Tattoo. The band followed this up with some live dates in Melbourne in mid-1989.

Numerous live shows led the band to prominence in the Sydney rock scene, and a follow-up single entitled Danger (backed with Wrap 2 Arms) was released in May 1990 on the Sydney label 'Timberyard'. A friendship between New Jersey band Skid Row and Candy Harlots was struck after a Hordern Pavilion show in 1990. Both bands jammed on The Troggs' song "Wild Thing" at an after-show party at the Kardomah Cafe, with members of Mötley Crüe (touring at the time) also in attendance.

In October 1990, Ron Barrett died after an asthma attack, at the age of 26. Ex-Flying Tigers guitarist Peter Masi was recruited in his stead. Lead guitarist Marc De Hugar was replaced in February 1991 by Phil Bowley (ex-Rags 'n' Riches, Shy Thunder). Mark Easton left after a final performance with Candy Harlots at Kardomah Cafe on 22 March 1991. New vocalist Tony 'Aiz' Lynch (ex-Backstreet Shuffle, a sometime support band to Candy Harlots) joined the band soon afterwards, and his songwriting skills helped the band to secure major label interest. Virgin Records signed the band after the track What Are We Fighting For?, co-written with Peter Stanton (ex-BB Steal, Back Street Shuffle), was played to Virgin representatives including future manager Andrew McManus. The Lynch-led line-up received greater media attention than the Easton-fronted group, and they remained popular with the Australian hard rock and heavy metal fraternity, gaining many new fans through Virgin-backed promotional activities.

In September 1991, a four-track cassette called The Tease Tapes was given away free with Hot Metal magazine, issue 31.

The Foreplay EP was released in March 1992 and reached No. 17 on the Australian Recording Industry Association (ARIA) Singles Chart. The debut album Five Wicked Ways followed in May, and reached a Top 40 ranking in the ARIA Albums Chart. The album was produced by Peter Blyton (The Radiators, Machinations) and spawned the successful single Sister's Crazy.

Virgin Records was eventually bought out by EMI and Candy Harlots were subsequently signed to EMI's US label. Soon afterwards, Aiz Lynch was fired from the band, to be replaced by vocalist Hayden Watt (ex-Triple X). In mid-1993, founding drummer Tony Cardinal quit the group along with Peter Masi. However, Bowley, Dee and Watt formed a new outfit called Helter Skelter, with the addition of drummer Tubby Wadsworth (ex-Killing Time, Mantissa). They released one single, Cry for Love (an Iggy Pop cover) before Watt was replaced by Jordan Howe. In April 1994, they became known as The Harlots, issuing a self-titled CD EP in October, before dissolving the following year.

The line-up of Lynch, Bowley, Masi, Dee and Cardinal reformed for a one-off concert at the Gaelic Theatre in Sydney on 31 October 2009.

== Post-breakup ==
- Tony Cardinal joined Screaming Tribesmen in the mid-1990s.
- Marc De Hugar joined Screaming Tribesmen in the mid-1990s alongside Tony Cardinal. Marc's glam rock-influenced band Dragonfly produced an EP, Zero, in August 2007 (on MGM Records), which sold out of all 5000 copies within one week, breaking industry sales records. The follow-up single, Cuts 'n' Bruises was voted 'Unearthed Song of the Year' by Australian radio station Triple J. De Hugar subsequently went on to perform, teach and run clinics for Bandai Namco, Randall and Charvel. Amongst other projects, he also had a short stint in a band called Evolution X, prior to the death of vocalist James Freud in 2010. De Hugar then relocated to the United States to record a third solo CD, with the working title of Trash Kats, which would feature performances by Anthony Esposito (ex-Lynch Mob and Jake E. Lee's Red Dragon Cartel). De Hugar died on 7 January 2022.
- Mark Easton continued to perform and record with his blues-rock outfit Mark Easton Limousine, releasing: Coast to Coast (2001), Greener (2004), and Bandwagon (2006). In October 2003, he performed at a reunion gig with his former band The Kelpies at The Annandale Hotel in Sydney. Easton went solo in 2007, playing slide guitar, harmonica, drums, loops, and vocals simultaneously. He has released three solo albums: Money is the Root of All Evil (2009), Live at Sydney Blues Festival (2010) and Grind (2012). He has toured extensively throughout Australia, including performances at many Blues and Roots festivals. In 2013, he teamed up with slide guitarist Adam Hole and released a live album, Attack of the Monster Guitars. A tour of Australia was arranged in 2014, in support of this release. Since 2015, Easton has been playing guitar and harmonica in The Geordie Leach Band (formerly named Mama's New Bag), which features Geordie Leach (of Rose Tattoo) on bass and Andrea Szabo on vocals and keyboards.
- Nick Szentkuti went on to perform as a singer and guitarist. In 2007, he formed a folk band called Five Leaves Left, who were scheduled to appear at the Blue Mountains Music Festival in March 2011.
- Scott Millard performed with the bands Crash Politics, Bell Jar, ID and Clusterfunk before releasing a solo EP under the name Crackerjack (1994). He then worked for Warner Music Group, Sega, Festival Records and Air Recordings. At the end of 1999, he moved to Singapore, to work for Namco Bandai Partners.
- Leeno Dee played with Phil Bowley in Velvet Claws, The Killer Kowboys and Dearly Beloved, who released an EP entitled Pushover in February 1997. He was also a member of the bands Jerk and Ink, before forming Melody Black with Tubby Wadsworth, Phil Bowley and Johnathan Devoy (ex-Jerk, Ink). In 2016, Dept. of Gloom formed, with Leeno Dee featuring on vocals and bass.
- Phil Bowley recorded with Gav Darby, Envy, The Flog Puppet and Fusion, and released two solo albums: Inside the Outside (2007) and Black Ice (2008).
- Peter Masi formed Stone Zone then played with Angry Anderson-Peter Wells Band (which featured members of Rose Tattoo), Mark Easton Limousine, and then Beware of the Dog with former Harlots vocalist Jordan Howe, before joining Ugly Little Secrets / Ugly Secrets.
- Aiz Lynch formed the short-lived band Angry Snuff Puppet. In early 2005, he was scheduled to appear at a tsunami benefit show in Richmond, New South Wales. He then went on to front the band Ugly Little Secrets, which also featured Peter Masi, Adam Laird and Johnny Hayes. In June 2012, the band's name was shortened to Ugly Secrets, with a lineup that included Peter Stanton on bass guitar and Steve Auburn on drums.
- Hayden Watt formed rock band Mist8kez and runs an independent record label, 'Illuminati Productions', and Goat Farm Studios in Victoria, Australia.
- Tubby Wadsworth went on to record and perform with Australian hardcore act Massappeal, Love Shark (of Machine Gun Fellatio) and Melody Black.
- Jordan Howe was a member of Beware of the Dog and H8Tank, then Paindivision (2007–2008) and Saint Lucifer (2010 onwards).

== Members ==
Candy Harlots (1987–1993), Helter Skelter (1993–1994), The Harlots (1994–1995):

- Ron Barrett – rhythm guitar (1987–1990)
  (died 3 October 1990)
- Tony Cardinal – drums (1987–1993, 2009)
- Marc Lee Dé Hugar – lead guitar (1987–1990)
  (died 7 January 2022)
- Mark Easton – lead vocals (1987–1991)
- Nick Szentkuti – bass guitar (1987–1988)
- Scott Millard – bass guitar (1988)
- Leeno Dee – bass guitar (1988–1995, 2009)
- Phil Bowley – lead guitar (1990–1995, 2009)
- Peter Masi – rhythm guitar (1990–1993, 2009)
- Aiz Lynch – lead vocals (1991–1992, 2009)
- Hayden Watt – lead vocals (1992–1994)
- Tubby Wadsworth – drums (1993–1995)
- Jordan Howe – lead vocals, rhythm guitar (1994–1995)

== Discography ==
=== Studio albums ===
List of albums, with selected chart positions
Title	Album details	Peak chart positions
Title	Album details	AUS
Five Wicked Ways	Released: May 1992; Format: CD, Cassette; Label: Virgin Records (V0ZC2056)	32

=== Extended plays ===
List of EPs, with selected chart positions
Title	EP details	Peak chart positions
Title	EP details	AUS
Foreplay	Released: February 1992; Format: CD, Cassette, VHS Video; Label: Virgin Records (VOZC134)	17

=== Singles ===
List of singles, with selected chart positions
Year	Title	Peak chart positions	Album
Year	Title	AUS	Album
1989	"Red Hot Rocket"	-	Non-album single
1990	"Danger"	107	Five Wicked Ways
1992	"Sister's Crazy"	37	Five Wicked Ways
1992	"What are We Fighting for?"	132	Five Wicked Ways

== See also ==
- List of glam metal bands and artists
