= Enerate =

- Origin: Blue Mountains, Sydney, NSW, Australia
- Genres: Art Pop, Synthpop, Electronic, Indie
- Years active: 2014-present
- Labels: Summer Recordings Australia, MGM Distribution
- Members: Joshua Graham; Matt Niciak; Ben Fitzpatrick; Therese Watson
- Website: Enerate

Enerate are a Sydney based Art Pop group. They are based in the Inner West region of Sydney, Australia. The band is currently signed to independent label Summer Recordings Australia, and is known for their debut album "Good Times Airlines", released in November 2017, which was released as a mobile app featuring interactive music videos for every song on the record. Enerate have toured alongside the likes of Mansionair, Christopher Port, Julien Mier and Merpire.

== History ==
Frontman Joshua Graham started Enerate as a solo project in The Blue Mountains near Sydney, Australia in 2009. Joshua Graham and bandmate, Matt Niciak both grew up in the Blue Mountains region, playing in separate bands. In mid-2008 the two were in competing bands in the grand final of BLUFM's Blue Mountains Battle of the Bands. The two became close friends and years later formed the full-band incarnation of Enerate.

During the year of 2009 Three early Enerate tracks were picked up and used for promotional advertisements by MTV Australia and New Zealand.

On 18 October 2011, Enerate launched their official website, and announced that they would be playing a string of Sydney shows. The band met Mika Appleton and Ben Fitzpatrick through Sydney street press mag Drum Media. Therese Watson Joined the band to cover shows for Appleton when she was abroad, stayed with the band.

Enerate's first public performances were at The Old Sydney Mint at a showcase for advertising company Ignite Media Brands On 5 November 2011 that a friend had asked them to appear at. Soon after they were playing more shows around Sydney, gaining momentum in the scene. In late November, Enerate put out a Pre-Release Demo entitled "The Good Times Airlines Pre-Flight Showing". Unstoppable was the first single, released digitally 7 November 2011. By Mid February the single was No. 3 in the Triple J Unearthed Indie Charts, and was picked up by Sydney radio station FBi, and was featured in their "Best From New Music Open Day" Podcast.

After a packed out show at Sydney's Gaelic Theatre, on 8 February 2012, The band have reportedly signed with a Sydney-based indie booking agent, and are locked in to record their debut release "Good Times Airlines" LP in May 2012.

In April 2012, The band were nominated for four MusicOz awards, The official Australian independent music awards. They were nominated for four songs across the three categories of "Alternative", "Pop", and "Electronic."

In 2017 Enerate unveiled their debut Interactive Visual Album at the launch party at MTV Australia studios.

== Interactive Visual Album ==
In a world first Enerate released their anticipated debut record as an Interactive Visual Album on 16 November 2017. The first of its kind - the 'Interactive Visual Album' titled 'Good Times Airlines' is an app containing unique interactive music videos for each and every song. The band released the album video teaser on their YouTube Channel on 29 October 2017.

Josh Graham conceived the Interactive Visual Album, saying of it ‘Art is becoming more multidisciplinary, and music is becoming more visual. The album is as much video as it is music. This is not a marketing tool for the album... this is the album." Josh continued "We wanted to make a physical release, that you can touch, feel, effect.. that was multi sensory and completely digital." The Interactive Visual Album features recent singles ‘Half Asleep’, & ‘Transit Lounge’, and is available for free on the Apple App Store, and Google Play Store.

Each music video on the album is interactive in its own way. The‘Unstoppable’ video turns into an 8 bit video game halfway through, and the viewer has to play the game to the end of the level to access the next part of the song and the story. In ‘Home’ the viewer has the power to change age of the band members. ‘Transit Lounge’ sees the viewer take a trip into the imagination of a young boy. As we take him into different worlds. ‘Its Ok’ is based in a security center. It's a multi-linear story that plays out over 6 video monitors, you can pick up bits of the story along the way as you watch from different cameras. You can take control of the band's fate in ’What Is Happening To Us’, Or choose from some hilarious alternate endings in ‘Half Asleep’

== Members ==
- Joshua Graham - production, lead vocals, guitar, synthesizer (2011 – present)
- Matt Niciak - bass guitar (2011 – present)
- Ben Fitzpatrick - drums and percussion (2011 – present)
- Therese Watson - vocals, keyboards, synths (2011 – present)

== Charts and Notable Achievements ==
- Released world's first Interactive Visual Album "Good Times Airlines", 16 November 2017.
- "Unstoppable" peaked at No. 3 In The Triple J Unearthed Indie Charts
- "Unstoppable" featured in the "Best of New Music Open Day" Podcast by FBi radio.

== Discography ==
=== Albums ===
- 'Good Times Airlines' (November 2017)

=== Singles ===
- Unstoppable
- I Think I Love
- Half Asleep
- Transit Lounge

=== Pre-Release Recordings ===
- Pre-Flight Showing (Demo) (10 December 2011)

=== Pre-Release Singles ===
- Unstoppable (November 2011) (Triple J Unearthed Indie Chart peak: No. 3)
- Fever For You (July 2011) (Triple J Unearthed Indie Chart peak: No. 20)
- British Embassy (October 2011)
