= Experimental pop =

Pop music that cannot be categorized within traditional musical boundaries

- Stylistic origins: Pop; avant-garde; experimental; electronic
- Cultural origins: 1950s and 1960s, United States and United Kingdom
- Derivative forms: Shoegaze

Other topics
- Alternative pop; art pop; avant-pop; electropop; experimental rock; experimental jazz; indie pop; noise pop; progressive pop; recording studio as an instrument

Experimental pop is pop music that cannot be categorized within traditional musical boundaries or which attempts to push elements of existing popular forms into new areas. It may incorporate experimental techniques such as musique concrète, aleatoric music, or eclecticism into pop contexts. Often, the compositional process involves the use of electronic production effects to manipulate sounds and arrangements, and the composer may draw the listener's attention specifically with both timbre and tonality, though not always simultaneously.

Experimental pop music developed concurrently with experimental jazz as a new kind of avant-garde, with many younger musicians embracing the practice of making studio recordings along the fringes of popular music. In the early 1960s, it was common for producers, songwriters, and engineers to freely experiment with musical form, orchestration, unnatural reverb, and other sound effects, and by the late 1960s, highly experimental pop music, or sounds that expanded the idea of the typical popular song, was positively received by young audiences.

== Characteristics ==
Author Bill Martin states that while the term "experimental pop" may sound "seemingly oxymoronic", it is possible to identify three criteria for characterizing its music:

- It is rooted in existing popular forms
- It experiments with or stretches the use of these popular forms
- It attempts to draw the audience of those forms toward these new developments, in the manner of the avant-garde

Some tendencies among artists include the incorporation of experimental techniques such as musique concrète, aleatoric music, or eclecticism into pop contexts. Often, the compositional process involves the use of electronic production effects to manipulate sounds and arrangements. According to musicologist Leigh Landy, experimental pop settings combine sound-based work and note-based work, though not always simultaneously. Composer Nico Muhly described the world of experimental pop as "celebrations of sonic juxtapositions".

== History ==
=== Origins (1950s–1960s) ===
Joe Meek – "Entry of the Globbots"
Joe Meek's 1960 EP I Hear a New World is described by the online publication Fact as an "experimental pop classic" that fused "jolly jug band pop and electronic tomfoolery".

Martin writes that experimental pop developed at roughly the same time as experimental jazz, (Note: In the chapter "Free Jazz and Experimental Jazz" of Music USA: The Rough Guide, the term "free jazz" is traced to the experimentations of a few musicians from Los Angeles in the late 1950s. Experimental jazz proceeded to become more "eccentric" over the next decade.) and that it emerged as "a new kind of avant-garde" made possible by the historical and material circumstances of its time. In the pop and rock music of the early 1960s, it was common for producers, songwriters, and engineers to freely experiment with musical form, orchestration, unnatural reverb, and other sound effects. Some of the best known examples are Phil Spector's Wall of Sound and Joe Meek's use of homemade electronic sound effects for acts like the Tornados. According to author Mark Brend, Meek's I Hear a New World (1960) predates better-known experimental pop by several years, (Note: In 2014, Meek was ranked the greatest producer of all time by NME, elaborating; "Meek was a complete trailblazer, attempting endless new ideas in his search for the perfect sound. [...] The legacy of his endless experimentation is writ large over most of your favourite music today." His reputation for experiments in recording music was acknowledged by the Music Producers Guild, who found "The Joe Meek Award for Innovation in Production" in 2009 as an "homage to [the] remarkable producer's pioneering spirit". The first artist inaugurated was Brian Eno.) whereas musicologist Leigh Landy names the American composer Frank Zappa as one of the first experimental pop musicians.

Musician David Grubbs writes that many younger musicians "moved out of [John] Cage's shadow by taking to a different extreme and embracing the practice of making studio recordings of works along the fringes of popular music". Grubbs further explains that some of the most prominent avant-garde musicians who formed rock bands in the mid 1960s were the Welsh John Cale (later of the Velvet Underground) and the American Joseph Byrd (later of the United States of America), who both went on to create albums of experimental pop music. However, a "gulf" would still exist between experimental composers and "out-there" pop musicians, partly due to the role of the recording studio. Regarding this, composer Robert Ashley is quoted in 1966;

We can't be popular musicians, where the fairly exciting things happen. [...] The one thing I like about popular music is that they record it. They record it, record it, record it, record it! The astute producer cuts out the magic from the different tapes (laughter) and puts them in a certain order and gets a whole piece. It's very beautiful, because it's really aural magic. [...] We have to invent social situations to allow that magic to happen.

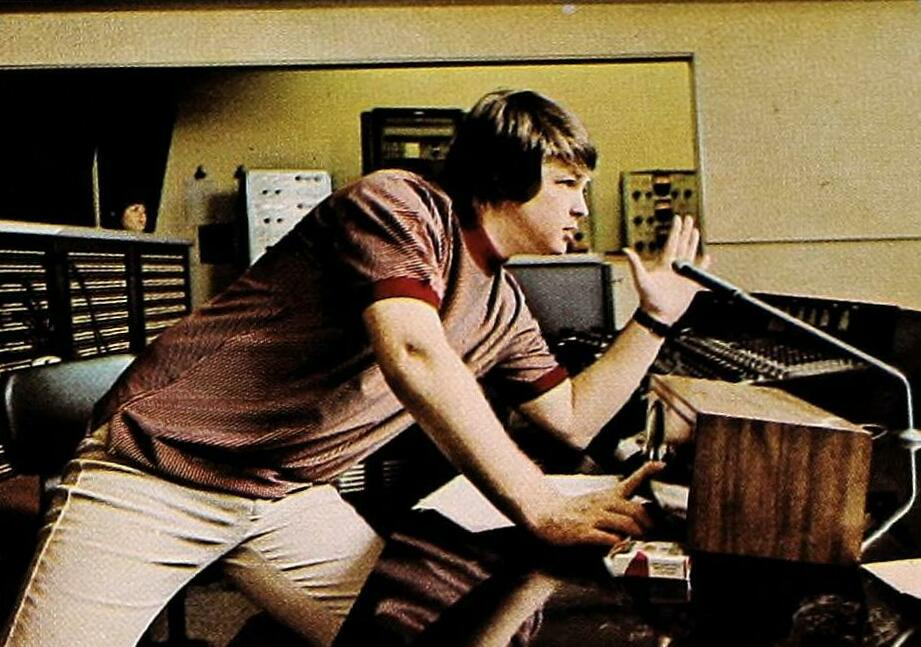
Brian Wilson in the studio, 1966

Music historian Lorenzo Candalaria described American rock band the Beach Boys as "one of the most experimental and innovative groups of the 1960s." Co-founder and leader Brian Wilson wrote and produced songs for the group that ranged from massive hits to obscure experimental pop compositions. (Note: New York magazine referred to the albums Pet Sounds (1966) and Smiley Smile (1967) as the group's "experimental pop phase", while Sean O'Hagan of the High Llamas named Wilson "the most experimental pop pioneer of our time [...] The same way Sun Ra was utilizing those ideas in the '60s, those guys [Wilson and collaborator Van Dyke Parks] were actually playing around with pop experimental music". NME ranked Wilson number eight in its "50 Greatest Producers Ever" list, describing his mid 1960s productions as "groundbreaking" and underheralded.) Their 1966 single "Good Vibrations", also produced and co-written by Wilson, topped record charts internationally, subsequently proliferating a wave of pop experimentation with its rush of riff changes, echo chamber effects, and intricate harmonies. (Note: AllMusic's John Bush compared the song's fragmented style to the cut-and-paste methods of experimentalist William S. Burroughs, continually switching between partially related sections, and challenging traditional verse-chorus-verse standards.) It was followed by Smiley Smile (1967), an album of stripped-down recordings. In 2003, Stylus Magazine wrote that the album "embrace[d] the listener with a drugged out sincerity; a feat never accomplished by the more pretentious and heavy-handed psychedelia of that era. It is for this reason Smiley Smile flows so well with the more experimental pop of today".

In the view of artist Duggie Fields, the Syd Barret-led incarnation of Pink Floyd exemplified experimental pop. The group found their initial success playing at the UFO Club in London, an underground venue whose objective was to provide an outlet for experimental pop groups. According to The New York Times, Barrett and his subsequent solo albums "became a touchstone for experimental pop musicians".

By the late 1960s, highly experimental pop music, or sounds that expanded the idea of the typical popular song, was positively received by young audiences, which cultural essayist Gerald Lyn Early credits to bands like Cream, Traffic, Blood, Sweat & Tears, and "of course", the Beatles. Drummer John Densmore believed that the Doors were on the cutting edge of experimental pop music until he listened to the Beatles' album Sgt. Pepper's Lonely Hearts Club Band (1967), which he described as "[seeming] to have done it all". Martin wrote that, along with the Rolling Stones' Their Satanic Majesties Request (1967), the Beatles' Sgt. Pepper "opened a space" for experimental pop which would be later filled by Jimi Hendrix, Jethro Tull, and the Who's Tommy (1968). Prior to Sgt. Pepper, Gary Usher and Curt Boettcher were Los Angeles–based songwriters and producers who were interested in classical music and the avant-garde. Later cited as fixtures of sunshine pop, they worked together to create their debut studio album, Present Tense (1968). It was credited to Sagittarius, a studio group referred to as an "experimental pop band" by The A.V. Club's Noel Murray. (Note: Their 1967 single "My World Fell Down" only reached number 70 on national charts, though critic Richie Unterberger considers it "one of the great experimental pop-psych gems of the era [...] sounding very much like a lost Beach Boys classic from the 'Good Vibrations' / Smile era.")

=== 1970s–1980s ===
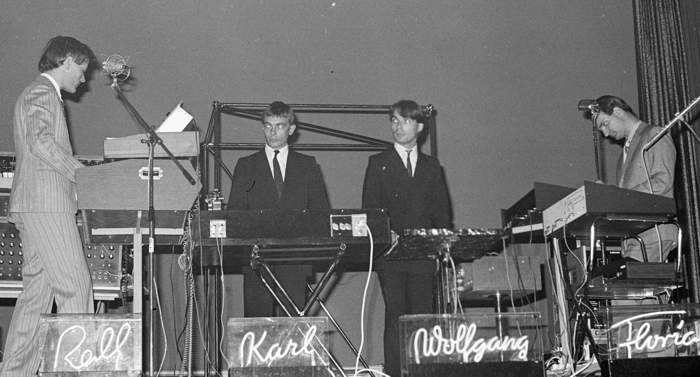
Kraftwerk performing in Zurich in 1976

Author Pascal Bussy wrote that German krautrock groups such as Can and Kraftwerk successfully bridged the gap between experimental and pop music in the 1970s, while according to The New York Times, Kraftwerk refined an "experimental pop sensibility" on albums such as Radio-Activity (1976) and Trans-Europe Express (1977). Writer Owen Hatherley located a "literary-experimental pop tradition" running throughout the United Kingdom during the 1970s and 1980s. Embodied by artists such as Roxy Music, the Smiths, the Associates, and Pet Shop Boys, this tradition "balanced sexuality and literacy, ostentatious performance and austere rectitude, raging ambition and class resentment, translating it into records balancing experimentation with populist cohesion."

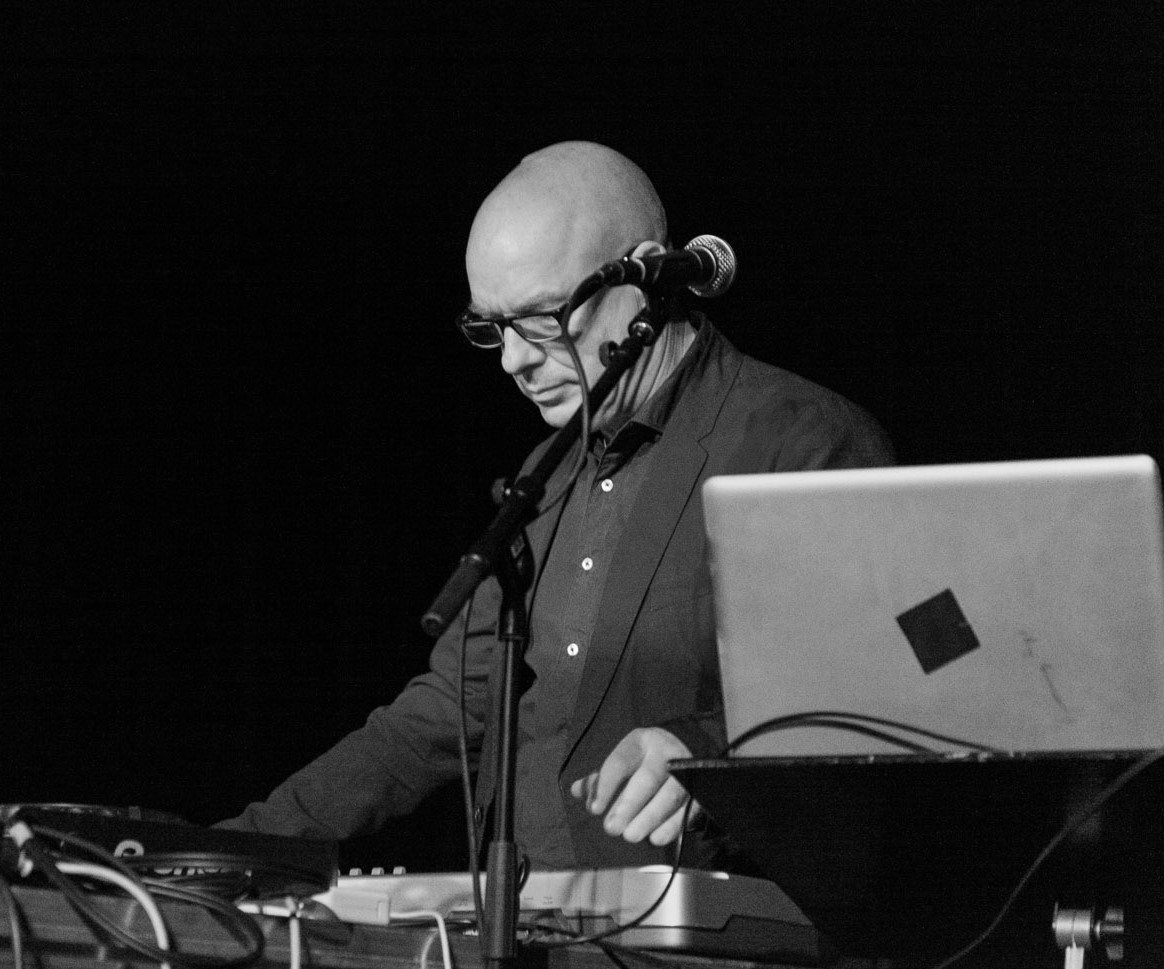
Brian Eno at a live remix in 2012

The 1970s work of ex-Roxy Music member musician Brian Eno is cited by Leigh Landy as an archetypal example of a pop musician who "applied developments from the experimental sector while creating their own experimental pop sector." Following his departure from Roxy Music in 1973, Eno began releasing a series of solo albums where he simultaneously developed his ambient, pop, and electronic styles. In the belief of pop musician Scott Miller, they were the era's "most successful" experimental pop artists, explaining that the key to Eno's success "appears to have been making a science out of decision points (see 'Oblique Strategies') rather than being willfully weird or different at the usual unexamined decision points" (Note: Journalist Andrew Marantz wrote that "his four experimental pop albums from the mid-1970s were universally revered and have influenced generations of indie rockers." Author Bill Martin credits Eno as the most important catalyst for "post-progressive" rock, explaining that the albums merged "warped aspects of progressive rock" with "a strange premonition of punk" and "the first approximations of new wave".)

Eno's album Before and After Science (1977), according to Joshua Pickard of publication Nooga, was "experimental pop lucidity [...] the culmination of sound that Eno had been working on since the release of Here Come the Warm Jets in 1973." Members of Roxy Music, Free, Fairport Convention, Can and Cluster feature on the record as session musicians in addition to Phil Collins, who performs drums on one track. Collins' own debut solo single "In the Air Tonight" (1981) was described by Gary Mills of The Quietus as being "at the vanguard of experimental pop" when it was released. He further called it "a rock oddity classic" which was influenced by "the unconventional studio predilections of Brian Eno and Peter Gabriel". Landy noted the tendency of experimental pop artists such as Eno and David Byrne to build tracks around existing recordings, effectively fusing different styles, a technique used on the duo's 1981 album My Life in the Bush of Ghosts.

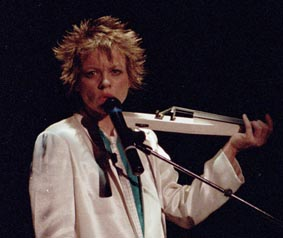
Laurie Anderson, 1980s

The New York Times' Will Hermes named Laurie Anderson an experimental pop pioneer whose signature song "O Superman" (1981) was a "left-field new wave hit" that "conflated maternal succor with the psychology of the modern corporate state using electronically processed verse." Writing for The Guardian, Jason Cowley described British singer-songwriter Kate Bush as "an artist superbly articulate in the language of experimental pop music". Paste Magazine credited My Bloody Valentine's 1988 album Isn't Anything with showcasing an experimental pop aesthetic, which drew on "harsh, swirling guitar tones and beautifully dissonant distortion," that eventually developed into the genre known as shoegazing. Martin suggested that hip hop music, particularly released by artists such as Public Enemy and KRS-One, emerged as a new form of experimental pop, seeing a renewed merger of artistic and political innovation.

=== 1990s–2000s ===
Icelandic singer Björk, who began her solo career in the 1990s, has been called "the queen of experimental pop" by The Guardian's Michael Cragg.

The record label Hippos in Tanks, founded by Barron Machat in 2010, was associated with Internet age experimental pop that drew on disparate sources such as new wave, avant-garde noise, R&B, and techno. The label released projects by artists such as James Ferraro, Autre Ne Veut, Laurel Halo, Hype Williams, and Arca.

== Bibliography ==
- Blake, Andrew (2009). "Recording practices and the role of the producer". In Cook, Nicholas; Clarke, Eric; Leech-Wilkinson, Daniel (eds.). The Cambridge Companion to Recorded Music. Cambridge University Press. ISBN 978-1-139-82796-6.
- Bogdanov, Vladimir; Woodstra, Chris; Erlewine, Stephen Thomas (2002). All Music Guide to Rock: The Definitive Guide to Rock, Pop, and Soul. Backbeat Books. ISBN 978-0-87930-653-3.
- Brend, Mark (2005). Strange Sounds: Offbeat Instruments and Sonic Experiments in Pop. Backbeat. ISBN 978-0-87930-855-1.
- Bussy, Pascal (2004). Kraftwerk: Man, Machine and Music. SAF Publishing Ltd. ISBN 978-0-946719-70-9.
- Candelaria, Lorenzo (2014). American Music: A Panorama, Concise. Cengage Learning. ISBN 978-1-305-16289-1.
- Chapman, Rob (2012). A Very Irregular Head: The Life of Syd Barrett. Da Capo Press. ISBN 978-0-306-82143-1.
- Densmore, John (2009). Riders on the Storm: My Life with Jim Morrison and the Doors. Random House Publishing Group. ISBN 978-0-307-42902-5.
- Early, Gerald Lyn (2001). Miles Davis and American Culture. Missouri History Museum. ISBN 978-1-883982-38-6.
- Grubbs, David (2014). Records Ruin the Landscape: John Cage, the Sixties, and Sound Recording. Duke University Press. ISBN 978-0-8223-7710-8.
- Johnson, Michael (2009). Pop Music Theory. Lulu.com. ISBN 978-0-578-03539-0.
- Landy, Leigh (1994). Experimental Music Notebooks. Taylor & Francis. ISBN 978-3-7186-5554-0.
- Landy, Leigh (2012). Making Music with Sounds. Routledge. ISBN 978-0-415-80678-7.
- Landy, Leigh (2013). What's the Matter with Today's Experimental Music. Routledge. ISBN 978-3-7186-5168-9.
- Martin, Bill (1998). Listening to the Future: The Time of Progressive Rock, 1968–1978. Open Court. ISBN 0-8126-9368-X.
- Martin, Bill (2015). Music of Yes: Structure and Vision in Progressive Rock. Open Court. ISBN 978-0-8126-9333-1.
- Miller, Scott (2010). Music: What Happened?. 125 Records. ISBN 978-0-615-38196-1.
- Palacios, Julian (2010). Syd Barrett & Pink Floyd: Dark Globe. Plexus. ISBN 978-0-85965-431-9.
- Unterberger, Richie; Hicks, Samb; Dempsey, Jennifer (1999). Music USA: The Rough Guide. Rough Guides. p. 15. ISBN 978-1-85828-421-7.
