= List of art pop musicians =

This is a list of artists who have been described as general purveyors of art pop. Individuals are alphabetized by surname.

== A–M ==
- 10cc
- Damon Albarn
- alt-J
- Tori Amos
- Laurie Anderson
- Angel Olsen
- Anohni
- Anohni and the Johnsons
- AURORA
- Austra
- The B-52's
- Bat for Lashes
- The Beach Boys
- The Beatles
- Beck
- Beyoncé
- Björk
- Dean Blunt
- Blur
- David Bowie
- The Buggles
- Kate Bush
- Cardiacs
- Chairlift
- Charli XCX
- Christine and the Queens
- Lana Del Rey
- Devo
- Django Django
- Eartheater
- Billie Eilish
- Enerate
- Brian Eno
- Everything Everything
- Faux Real
- Freur
- Fiona Apple
- FKA twigs
- Fleetwood Mac
- Florence and the Machine
- Franz Ferdinand
- Freur
- f(x)
- Peter Gabriel
- Gorillaz
- Grimes
- iamamiwhoami
- Imogen Heap
- Julia Holter
- Jenny Hval
- The Human League
- Jakarta
- Japan
- Zola Jesus
- Jockstrap
- Grace Jones
- Kanye West
- Kimbra
- Kilo Kish
- Kraftwerk
- Daniela Lalita
- John Lennon
- Let's Eat Grandma
- Little Fuss
- Lorde
- Madonna
- Majical Cloudz
- Marina Diamandis
- Melanie Martinez
- Micachu & the Shapes
- Mitski
- Janelle Monáe
- Róisín Murphy

== N–Z ==
- OnlyOneOf
- Orchestral Manoeuvres in the Dark
- Van Dyke Parks
- Pavement
- Perfume Genius
- Pet Shop Boys
- Poppy
- Ariel Pink
- Caroline Polachek
- P.M. Dawn
- Dawn Richard
- Radiohead
- Roxy Music
- Arthur Russell
- Ringo Sheena
- Duncan Sheik
- Solange
- Sophie
- Sparks
- Spookey Ruben
- St. Vincent
- Stereolab
- Susanne Sundfør
- Talk Talk
- Talking Heads
- Tune-yards
- U.S. Girls
- Scott Walker
- Weyes Blood
- Hayley Williams
- Brian Wilson
- XTC
- Yellow Magic Orchestra
