= Art pop =

Style of pop music

- Stylistic origins: Pop; pop art
- Cultural origins: Mid-1960s, United Kingdom and United States
- Derivative forms: Glam rock; post-punk; synth-pop; vaporwave

Other topics
- Art rock; industrial; list of art pop musicians; alternative pop; art world; avant-pop; indie pop; new wave; new musick; noise pop; commercialism; experimental pop; low culture; New Romantic; power pop; progressive pop

Art pop is a loosely defined style of pop music that emerged in the mid-1960s, influenced by art theories as well as ideas from other art mediums, such as fashion, fine art, cinema, contemporary art and avant-garde literature. The genre draws on pop art's integration of high and low culture, and emphasizes imagery, style, and gesture over personal expression. Art pop musicians may deviate from traditional pop audiences and rock music conventions, instead exploring postmodern approaches and ideas such as pop's status as commercial art, notions of artifice and the self, and questions of historical authenticity.

During the mid-1960s, British and American pop musicians such as Brian Wilson, Phil Spector, and the Beatles began incorporating the ideas of the pop art movement into their recordings. English art pop musicians drew from their art school studies, while in America the style drew on the influence of pop artist Andy Warhol and the affiliated band the Velvet Underground. The style would experience its "golden age" in the 1970s among glam rock artists such as David Bowie, 10cc, Roxy Music, and Sparks, who embraced theatricality and throwaway pop culture.

Art pop's tradition continued in the late 1970s and 1980s through styles such as post-punk and synthpop as well as the British New Romantic scene, developing further with artists who rejected conventional rock instrumentation and structure in favor of dance styles and the synthesizer. The 2010s saw new art pop trends develop, such as hip hop artists drawing on visual art and vaporwave artists exploring the sensibilities of contemporary capitalism and the Internet.

== Characteristics ==
Art pop draws on postmodernism's breakdown of the high/low cultural boundary and explores concepts of artifice and commerce. (Note: "If postmodernism means a breakdown of high/low cultural boundaries, it means too the end of this historical myth – which is where the art-pop musicians come in, complicating sociological readings of what music means, putting into play their own accounts of authenticity and artifice.") The style emphasizes the manipulation of signs over personal expression, drawing on an aesthetic of the everyday and the disposable, in distinction to the Romantic and autonomous tradition embodied by art rock or progressive rock. (Note: Historically, "art rock" has been used to describe at least two related, but distinct, types of rock music. The first is progressive rock, while the second usage refers to groups who rejected psychedelia and the hippie counterculture in favor of a modernist, avant-garde approach defined by the Velvet Underground. In the rock music of the 1970s, the "art" descriptor was generally understood to mean "aggressively avant-garde" or "pretentiously progressive".) Sociomusicologist Simon Frith has distinguished the appropriation of art into pop music as having a particular concern with style, gesture, and the ironic use of historical eras and genres. Central to particular purveyors of the style were notions of the self as a work of construction and artifice, as well as a preoccupation with the invention of terms, imagery, process, and affect. The Independent's Nick Coleman wrote: "Art-pop is partly about attitude and style; but it's essentially about art. It is, if you like, a way of making pure formalism socially acceptable in a pop context."

Cultural theorist Mark Fisher wrote that the development of art pop evolved out of the triangulation of pop, art, and fashion. Frith states that it was "more or less" directly inspired by Pop art. (Note: Musicologist Allan Moore surmises that the term "pop music" itself may have originated from Pop art.) According to critic Stephen Holden, art pop often refers to any pop style which deliberately aspires to the formal values of classical music and poetry, though these works are often marketed by commercial interests rather than respected cultural institutions. Writers for The Independent and the Financial Times have noted the attempts of art pop music to distance its audiences from the public at large. Robert Christgau wrote in The Village Voice in 1987 that art-pop results "when a fascination with craft spirals up and in until it turns into an aestheticist obsession."

== Cultural background ==
What seems clearer in retrospect [...] is a distinction between the first wave of art school musicians, the London provincial r & b players who simply picked up the bohemian attitude and carried it with them into progressive rock, and a second generation, who applied art theories to pop music making

— Simon Frith, Art into Pop (1988)

The boundaries between art and pop music became increasingly blurred throughout the second half of the 20th century. In the 1960s, pop musicians such as John Lennon, Syd Barrett, Pete Townshend, Brian Eno, and Bryan Ferry began to take inspiration from their previous art school studies. Frith states that in Britain, art school represented "a traditional escape route for the bright working class kids, and a breeding ground for young bands like the Beatles and beyond". In North America, art pop was influenced by Bob Dylan and the Beat Generation, and became more literary through folk music's singer-songwriter movement. Before progressive/art rock became the most commercially successful British sound of the early 1970s, the 1960s psychedelic movement brought together art and commercialism, broaching the question of what it meant to be an "artist" in a mass medium. Progressive musicians thought that artistic status depended on personal autonomy, and so the strategy of "progressive" rock groups was to present themselves as performers and composers "above" normal pop practice.

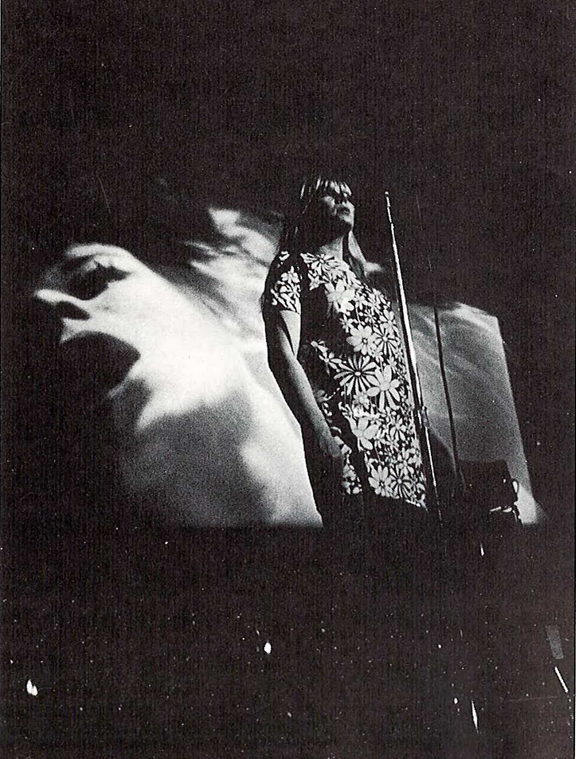
Multimedia performance of Warhol's Exploding Plastic Inevitable featuring Nico (right), 1966.

Another chief influence on the development of art pop was the Pop art movement. The term "pop art", first coined to describe the aesthetic value of mass-produced goods, was directly applicable to the contemporary phenomenon of rock and roll (including Elvis Presley, an early Pop art icon). According to Frith: "[Pop art] turned out to signal the end of Romanticism, to be an art without artists. Progressive rock was the bohemians' last bet [...] In this context the key Pop art theorist was not [Richard] Hamilton or any of the other British artists who, for all their interest in the mass market, remained its academic admirers only, but Andy Warhol. For Warhol the significant issue wasn't the relative merits of 'high' and 'low' art but the relationship between all art and 'commerce'." Warhol's Factory house band the Velvet Underground was an American group who emulated Warhol's art/pop synthesis, echoing his emphasis on simplicity, and pioneering a modernist avant-garde approach to art rock that ignored the conventional hierarchies of artistic representation. (Note: When the Velvet Underground first appeared in the mid 1960s, they faced rejection and were commonly dismissed as a "fag" band.)

== 1960s: Origins ==
The Beach Boys – "Good Vibrations" (1966)
"Good Vibrations" is a "majesty" of art pop by critic Ed Masley's description. Upon release, it became the group's biggest selling single.

The Beatles – "Strawberry Fields Forever" (1967)
Journalist Peter Doggett also characterized "Strawberry Fields Forever" as art pop, noting its attempt to "self-consciously exclude [...] the mass audience".

Holden traces art pop's origins to the mid-1960s, when producers such as Phil Spector and musicians such as Brian Wilson of the Beach Boys began incorporating pseudo-symphonic textures to their pop recordings, as well as the Beatles' first recordings with a string quartet. (Note: Through their influential work, Wilson and the Beatles' producer George Martin spread the idea of the recording studio as a creative environment that could assist in the songwriting process. Author Michael Johnson credits the Beach Boys' Pet Sounds (1966) and the Beatles' Sgt. Pepper's Lonely Hearts Club Band (1967) as the first documented "ascension" of rock and roll. Spector has also been credited by journalist Richard Williams with transforming rock music as a performing art to an art which could only exist in the recording studio, which "paved the way for art rock".) In the words of author Matthew Bannister, Wilson and Spector were both known as "eremitic studio obsessives [...] [who] habitually absented themselves from their own work", and like Warhol, Spector existed "not as presence, but as a controlling or organising principle behind and beneath the surfaces of media. Both vastly successful commercial artists, and both simultaneously absent and present in their own creations."

Writer Erik Davis called Wilson's art pop "unique in music history", while collaborator Van Dyke Parks compared it to the contemporaneous work of Warhol and artist Roy Lichtenstein, citing his ability to elevate common or hackneyed material to the level of "high art". (Note: The Beach Boys were virtually disconnected from the cultural avant-garde, according to biographer Peter Ames Carlin, who concluded that – with the possible exception of Wilson – they "had [not] shown much discernible interest in what you might call the world of ideas." Wilson's unreleased Smile, conceived and recorded in 1966–67, has been described as an attempt to create "the great art pop album" and the "preeminent psychedelic pop art statement" of the era.) In his 2004 book Sonic Alchemy: Visionary Music Producers and Their Maverick Recordings, David Howard credits the Beach Boys' 1966 single "Good Vibrations" with launching the "brief, shining moment [when] pop and art came together as unlikely commercial bedfellows."

In a move that was indicated by the Beatles, the Beach Boys, Phil Spector, and Frank Zappa, the dominant format of pop music transitioned from singles to albums, and many rock bands created works that aspired to make grand artistic statements, where art rock would flourish. Musicologist Ian Inglis writes that the cover art for the Beatles' 1967 album Sgt. Pepper's Lonely Hearts Club Band was "perceived as largely responsible for the connections between art and pop to be made explicit". Although Sgt. Pepper's was preceded by several albums that had begun to bridge the line between "disposable" pop and "serious" rock, it successfully gave an established "commercial" voice to an alternative youth culture. Author Michael Johnson wrote that art pop music would continue to exist subsequent to the Beatles, but without ever achieving their level of popular success. (Note: Frith likened the album's elaborate design to "reading the underground press [...] [a skill that] was always constructed around a sense of difference from the 'mass' pop audience. Art rock was 'superior' to all levels. [...] the philistines had to be kept out." He also notes that Zappa targeted the issue of pop commercialism with the cover of the Mothers of Invention's 1968 album We're Only in It for the Money, which parodied the cover of Sgt. Pepper's.)

The Who was labelled "the first pop art band" by their manager, while member Pete Townshend explains: "We stand for pop art clothes, pop art music and pop art behaviour [...] we don't change offstage; we live pop art." Frith considers their album The Who Sell Out (December 1967) "perhaps the Pop art pop masterpiece", the Who using the "vitality" of commerce itself, a tactic echoed by Roy Wood's the Move and, later, Kevin Godley and Lol Creme of 10cc. Townshend's ideas were notable for their emphasis on commercialism: "[His] use of Pop art rhetoric [...] referred not to music-making as such – to the issue of self-expression – but to commercial music-making, to issues of packaging, selling and publicizing, to the problems of popularity and stardom." In a May 1967 interview, Townshend coined the term "power pop" to describe the music of the Who, the Small Faces, and the Beach Boys. Power pop later developed as a genre known for its reconfiguration of 1960s tropes. Music journalist Paul Lester argued that this component could ratify power pop as one of the first postmodern music genres.

== 1970s: New York scene and glam ==
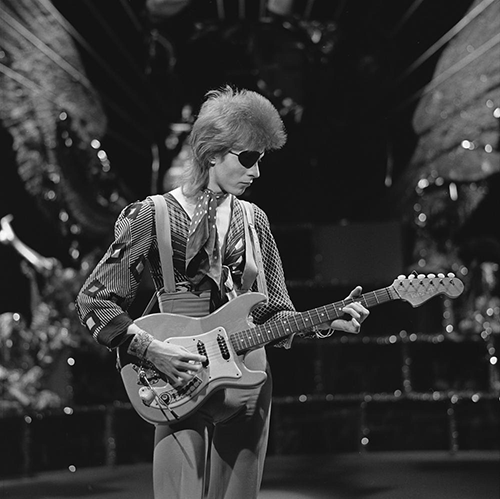
David Bowie, 1974

Music journalist Paul Lester locates "the golden age of adroit, intelligent art-pop" to when the bands 10cc, Roxy Music and Sparks "were mixing and matching from different genres and eras, well before the term 'postmodern' existed in the pop realm." The effect of the Velvet Underground gave rock musicians like Iggy Pop of the Stooges a self-consciousness about their work. Iggy was inspired to transform his personality into an art object, which would in turn influence singer David Bowie, and led to the Stooges' role as the group linking 1960s hard rock to 1970s punk. In the 1970s, a similarly self-conscious art/pop community (which Frith calls "the most significant" of the period) began to coalesce in the Mercer Arts Center in New York. The school encouraged the continuation of the kinds of collaboration between high and low art once exemplified by the Factory, as drummer Jerry Harrison (later of Talking Heads) explained: "it started with the Velvet Underground and all of the things that were identified with Andy Warhol." (Note: Other students of the center included Laurie Anderson, Suicide's Alan Vega, and Blondie's Chris Stein.)

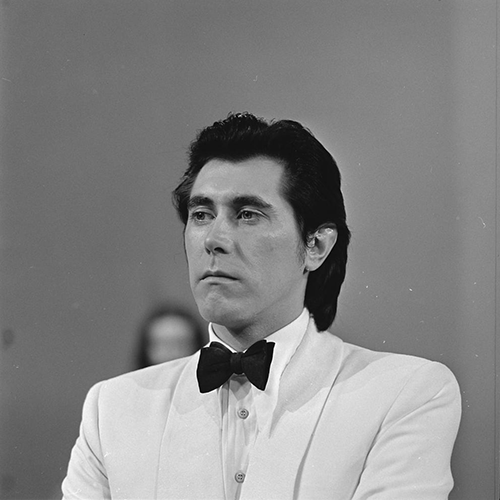
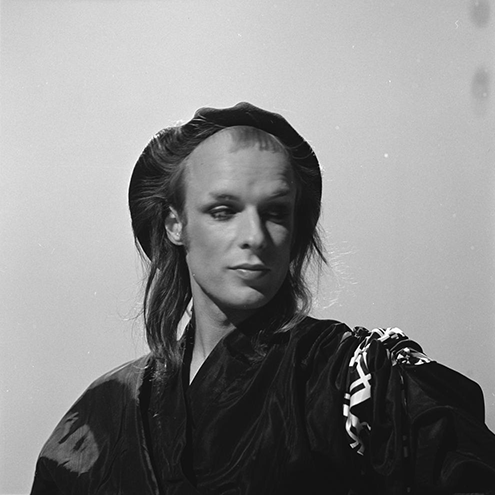
Bryan Ferry and Brian Eno in the 1970s

The glam rock scene of the early 1970s would again draw widely on art school sensibilities. Inspired partly by the Beatles' use of alter egos on Sgt. Pepper's, glam emphasized outlandish costumes, theatrical performances, and allusions to throwaway pop culture phenomena, becoming one of the most deliberately visual phenomena to emerge in rock music. Some of its artists, like Bowie, Roxy Music, and ex-Velvet Underground member Lou Reed, would continue the practices associated with the modernist avant-garde branch of art rock. (Note: Scholar Philip Auslander noted a pattern with artists who irreverently plundered older styles of music, such as Brill Building and Spector's Wall of Sound. Producer Tony Visconti remembers that in 1970, he, Bowie, and T. Rex's Marc Bolan would "get high and listen to Beach Boys albums and Phil Spector albums – we all had that in common, that we loved the Beach Boys.")

Bowie, a former art-school student and painter, made visual presentation a central aspect of his work, deriving his concept of art pop from the work and attitudes of Warhol and the Velvet Underground. Roxy Music is described by Frith as the "archetypical art pop band." Frontman Bryan Ferry incorporated the influence of his mentor, pop art pioneer Richard Hamilton while synthesizer player Brian Eno drew on his study of cybernetics and art under theorist Roy Ascott. (Note: Eno's initial musical influences were ideas from the classical avant-garde, like John Cage's indeterminacy, La Monte Young's minimalism, and the Velvet Underground — specifically the band's John Cale.) Frith posits that Ferry and Bowie remain "the most significant influences in British pop", writing they were both concerned with "pop as commercial art", and together made glam rock into an art form to be taken seriously, unlike other "camp" acts such as Gary Glitter. This redefined progressive rock and revitalized the idea of the Romantic artist in terms of media fame. According to Armond White, Roxy Music's engagement with pop art practices effectively "showed that pop's surface frivolity and deep pleasure were legitimate and commanding pursuits." After leaving Roxy Music in 1973, Eno would further explore art pop styles on a series of experimental solo albums. (Note: Eno's 1970s work is cited by musicologist Leigh Landy as an archetypal example of a pop musician who "applied developments from the experimental sector while creating their own experimental pop sector".) For the rest of the decade, he developed Warhol's arguments in a different direction from his contemporaries, and collaborated with a wide range of popular musicians of the era.

== 1970s–80s: Post-punk developments ==
Cultural theorist Mark Fisher characterized a variety of musical developments in the late 1970s, including post-punk, synthpop, and particularly the work of German electronic band Kraftwerk, as situated within art pop traditions. He states that Bowie and Roxy Music's English style of art pop "culminated" with the music of the British group Japan. The Quietus characterized Japan's 1979 album Quiet Life as defining "a very European form of detached, sexually-ambiguous and thoughtful art-pop" similar to that explored by Bowie on 1977's Low. Brian Eno and John Cale would serve a crucial part in the careers of Bowie, Talking Heads, and many key punk and post-punk records. Following the amateurism of the punk movement, post-punk era saw a return to the art school tradition previously embodied by the work of Bowie and Roxy Music, with artists drawing ideas from literature, art, cinema, and critical theory into musical and pop cultural contexts while refusing the common distinction between high art and low culture. (Note: Among major influences on a variety of post-punk artists were postmodern novelists such as William S. Burroughs and J. G. Ballard and avant-garde political movements such as Situationism and Dada. Additionally, in some locations the creation of post-punk music was closely linked to the development of efficacious subcultures, which played important roles in the production of art, multimedia performances, fanzines related to the music. Simon Reynolds would note: "Beyond the musicians, there was a whole cadre of catalysts and culture warriors, enablers and ideologues who started labels, managed bands, became innovative producers, published fanzines, ran hipster record stores, promoted gigs and organized festivals.") An emphasis on multimedia performance and visual art became common.

Kate Bush – "Running Up That Hill" (1985)
According to The Concordian, "Running Up That Hill" was among the most distinctive and revolutionary works of 1980s art pop, containing "darting drum rhythms" and Bush's "dogged vocals".

Fisher characterized subsequent artists such as Grace Jones, the New Romantic groups of the 1980s, and Róisín Murphy as a part of an art pop lineage. He noted that the development of art pop involved the rejection of conventional rock instrumentation and structure in favor of dance styles and the synthesizer. The Quietus names English New Romantic act Duran Duran, who were formatively influenced by the work of Japan, Kraftwerk and David Bowie, as "pioneering art pop up to arena-packing level", developing the style into "a baroque, romantic escape." Critic Simon Reynolds dubbed English singer Kate Bush "the queen of art-pop", citing her merging of glamour, conceptualism, and innovation without forsaking commercial pop success during the late 1970s and 1980s.

== 1990s–present: Online and beyond ==
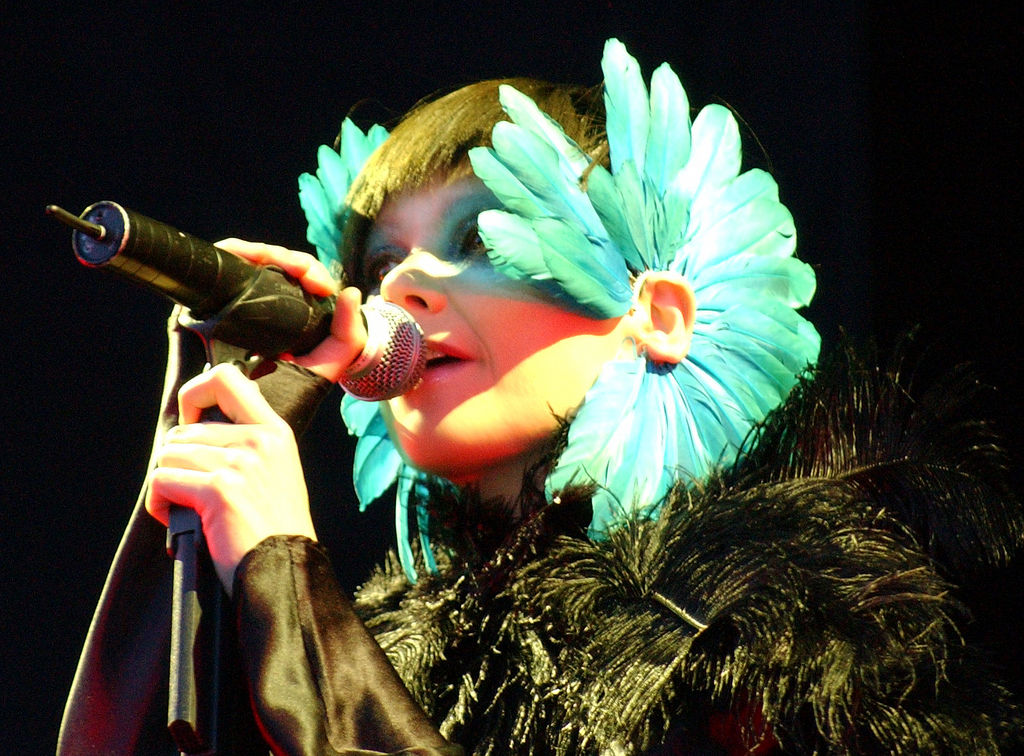
Björk performing in 2003 at Hurricane Festival

Icelandic singer Björk was a prominent purveyor of art pop for her wide-ranging integration of disparate forms of art and popular culture. During the 1990s, she became art pop's most commercially successful artist. Discussing Björk in 2015, Jason Farago of The Guardian wrote: "The last 30 years in art history are in large part a story of collaborative enterprises, of collapsed boundaries between high art and low, and of the end of divisions between media. Few cultural figures have made the distinctions seem as meaningless as the Icelandic singer who combined trip hop with 12-tone, and who brought the avant garde to MTV just before both those things disappeared."

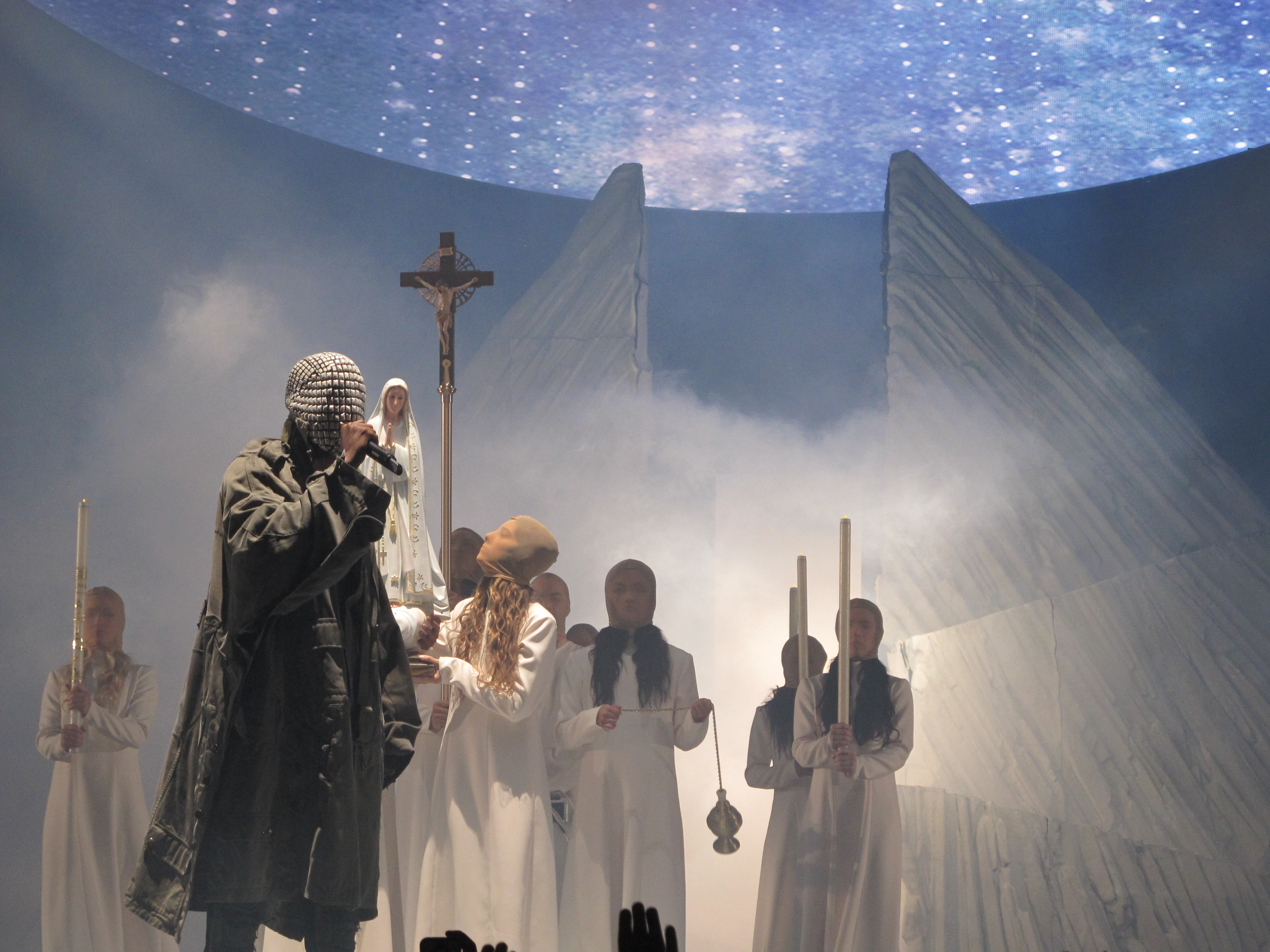
West's Yeezus Tour was described by Forbes as "the current mass cultural phenomenon best described as 'artpop.'"

According to Barry Walters of NPR, 1990s rap group P.M. Dawn developed a style of "kaleidoscopic art-pop" that was initially dismissed by hip hop fans as "too soft, ruminative and far-ranging" but would eventually pave the way for the work of artists like Drake and Kanye West. In 2013, Spin noted a "new art-pop era" in contemporary music, led by West, in which musicians draw on visual art as a signifier of wealth and extravagance as well as creative exploration. Fact labels West's 2008 album 808s & Heartbreak as an "art-pop masterpiece" which would have a substantive influence on subsequent hip hop music, broadening the style beyond its contemporary emphasis on self-aggrandizement and bravado. The New York Times' Jon Caramanica described West's "thought-provoking and grand-scaled" works as having "widened [hip hop]'s gates, whether for middle-class values or high-fashion and high-art dreams."

Contemporary female artists who "merge glamour, conceptualism, innovation and autonomy," such as Grimes, Julia Holter, Lana Del Rey and FKA twigs, are frequently described as working in the tradition of Kate Bush. Grimes is described by the Montreal Gazette as "an art-pop phenomenon" and part of "a long tradition of fascination with the pop star as artwork in progress", with particular attention drawn to role of the Internet and digital platforms in her success.

In a 2012 piece for Dummy, critic Adam Harper described an accelerationist zeitgeist in contemporary art-pop characterized by an ambiguous engagement with elements of contemporary capitalism. He mentions the Internet-based genre vaporwave as consisting of underground art-pop musicians like James Ferraro and Daniel Lopatin "exploring the technological and commercial frontiers of 21st century hyper-capitalism's grimmest artistic sensibilities". Artists associated with the scene may release music via online pseudonyms while drawing on ideas of virtuality and synthetic 1990s sources such as corporate mood music, lounge music, and muzak.

== See also ==
- List of art pop musicians
- Art music
- Avant-pop
- Art world

== Bibliography ==
- Auslander, Philip (2006). Performing Glam Rock: Gender and Theatricality in Popular Music. University of Michigan Press. ISBN 0-472-06868-7.
- Bannister, Matthew (2007). White Boys, White Noise: Masculinities and 1980s Indie Guitar Rock. Ashgate Publishing, Ltd. ISBN 978-0-7546-8803-7.
- Buckley, David (2012). Strange Fascination: David Bowie: The Definitive Story. Random House. ISBN 978-1-4481-3247-8.
- Carlin, Peter Ames (2006). Catch a Wave: The Rise, Fall, and Redemption of the Beach Boys' Brian Wilson. Rodale. ISBN 978-1-59486-320-2.
- Curtis, James M. (1987). Rock Eras: Interpretations of Music and Society, 1954–1984. Popular Press. ISBN 978-0-87972-369-9.
- Howard, David N. (2004). Sonic Alchemy: Visionary Music Producers and Their Maverick Recordings (1st ed.). Milwaukee, WI: Hal Leonard Corp. ISBN 0634055607.
- Molon, Dominic; Diederichsen, Diedrich (2007). Sympathy for the Devil: Art and Rock and Roll Since 1967. Yale University Press. ISBN 978-0-300-13426-1.
- Edmondson, Jacqueline, ed. (2013). Music in American Life: An Encyclopedia of the Songs, Styles, Stars, and Stories that Shaped our Culture. ABC-CLIO. ISBN 978-0-313-39348-8.
- Fisher, Mark (2014). "'Just When I Think I'm Winning'". Ghosts of My Life: Writings on Depression, Hauntology and Lost Futures. Zero Books. ISBN 978-1-78099-226-6.
- Frith, Simon (1989). Facing the Music: A Pantheon Guide to Popular Culture. Pantheon Books. ISBN 0-394-55849-9.
- Frith, Simon; Horne, Howard (2016) [First published 1988]. Art Into Pop. Routledge. ISBN 978-1-317-22803-5.
- Holm-Hudson, Kevin, ed. (2013). Progressive Rock Reconsidered. Routledge. ISBN 978-1-135-71022-4.
- Landy, Leigh (2013). What's the Matter with Today's Experimental Music. Routledge. ISBN 978-3-7186-5168-9.
- MacDonald, Ian (2005). Revolution in the Head: The Beatles' Records and the Sixties (3rd ed.). Chicago Review Press. ISBN 978-1-55652-733-3.
- Johnson, Michael (2009). Pop Music Theory. Lulu.com. ISBN 978-0-578-03539-0.
- Julien, Oliver (2008). Julien, Olivier (ed.). Sgt. Pepper and the Beatles: It Was Forty Years Ago Today. Ashgate. ISBN 978-0-7546-6708-7.
- Moore, Allan F. (2016). Song Means: Analysing and Interpreting Recorded Popular Song. Routledge. ISBN 978-1-317-05265-4.
- Reynolds, Simon (2006). Rip It Up and Start Again: Postpunk 1978–1984. Penguin Publishing Group. ISBN 978-1-101-20105-3.
- Rojek, Chris (2011). Pop Music, Pop Culture. Polity. ISBN 978-0-7456-4263-5.
- Williams, Richard (2003). Phil Spector: Out of His Head. Music Sales Group. ISBN 978-0-7119-9864-3.
