= Rat!hammock =

Australian band

RAT!hammock
- Origin: Melbourne, Victoria, Australia
- Genres: Indie rock, alternative rock, freak folk
- Years active: 2017–present
- Members: Tom Dowling; Jack Nicholson; Jackson Phelan; Merpire
- Past members: Dominic Buckham; Sean Conran; Michael Cooper
- Website: http://rathammock.com

RAT!hammock are an Australian indie rock band from Melbourne.

== History ==
The band was formed in 2017 and played their first gig at The Grace Darling Hotel while they were developing their sound. They have had several members rotate in and out since forming, but their longest-standing and best-known line-up consisted of Jackson Phelan, Tom Dowling, Jack Nicolson, and Dom Buckham. Their first release with this lineup was 2020's "Word Of The Day".

In 2018 they toured with Last Dinosaurs and played St Jerome's Laneway Festival and Falls Festival in 2019. They have received airplay on radio stations Triple J, FBi Radio, and 3RRR, and were #29 in the 50 most-played artists on Triple J Unearthed Radio for 2018, and #24 in 2019.

In 2021 they performed for Rolling Stone Australia's 'In My Room'.

== Members ==
Current members

- Jackson Phelan – lead vocals, rhythm guitar (2017–present)
- Tom Dowling – lead guitar, backing vocals (2017–present)
- Jack Nicholson – drums (2017–present)
- Merpire – keyboards, percussion, backing vocals (2022–present)

Past members

- Michael Cooper – bass (2017–2018)
- Sean Conran – bass, backing vocals (2018–2019)
- Dominic Buckham – bass, backing vocals (2019–2023)

== Discography ==
EPs

- Pam (2017)

Compilation albums

- Everything, All At Once, Forever (2020)

Singles

- "Mary the Chair" (2017)
- "Love You Til I Die" (2017)
- "Power" (2018)
- "June" (2018)
- "Ghost" (2019)
- "Pick Up" (2019)
- "Word of the Day" (2020)
- "Easy" b/w "Same But A Little Bit Less" (2020)

== Charts ==
=== AMRAP Charts ===
Australian Music Radio Airplay Project (AMRAP) are managed by Community Broadcasting Association of Australia. The Regional Charts reflect the most downloaded tracks through Amrap by broadcasters in regional locations, while the Metro Charts reflect metropolitan community broadcasters.

- 2018 - "June" - #3 - Regional Chart
- 2019 - "Pick Up" - #1 - Metro Chart
