= Art into Pop =

1987 book by Simon Frith and Howard Horne

- Author: Simon Frith, Howard Horne
- Subject: Art, popular music
- Genre: Musicology
- Publication date: 1987
- Media type: Print
- Pages: 206
- ISBN: 9780416415407

Art into Pop is a book by Simon Frith and Howard Horne, published in 1987. It analyses the integration of art school sensibilities in popular music since the 1950s. According to the authors, inspiration for the book came when they observed that a "significant number of British pop musicians from the 1960s to the present were educated and first started performing in art schools." According to academic Barry Faulk, it was "the first study to suggest that punk rock was art-school inspired, though without addressing the disparity between sociological reality and the rhetoric of punk rock groups."

== See also ==
- Art pop
- Pop art
