= Organised Sound =

- Discipline: Music Technology, Electroacoustic music, sound art, sound sculpture
- Language: English
- Edited by: Leigh Landy

Publication details
- History: 1996–present
- Publisher: Cambridge University Press (UK)
- Frequency: Triannual

Standard abbreviations
- ISO 4: Organised Sound

Indexing
- ISSN: 1355-7718 (print); 1469-8153 (web)

Links
- Journal homepage

Organised Sound is an international peer-reviewed academic journal which focuses on the rapidly developing methods and issues arising from the use of technology in music today.

== Background ==
Published three times a year, it concentrates upon the impact which the application of technology is having upon music in a variety of genres, including sound art, sound sculpture and music ranging from popular idioms to experimental electroacoustic composition. It thus provides a forum for those interested in electroacoustic music studies, its creation and related developments to share the results of their research as they affect musical issues. Whilst an accompanying CD/CD-ROM/DVD is sent to subscribers annually all media content is or will soon also be available online.

Organised Sound was founded in 1996. Its editor, Leigh Landy (De Montfort University, Leicester, UK), is assisted by a diverse range of associated and regional editors.
