= Leeno Dee =

Australian bassist and singer

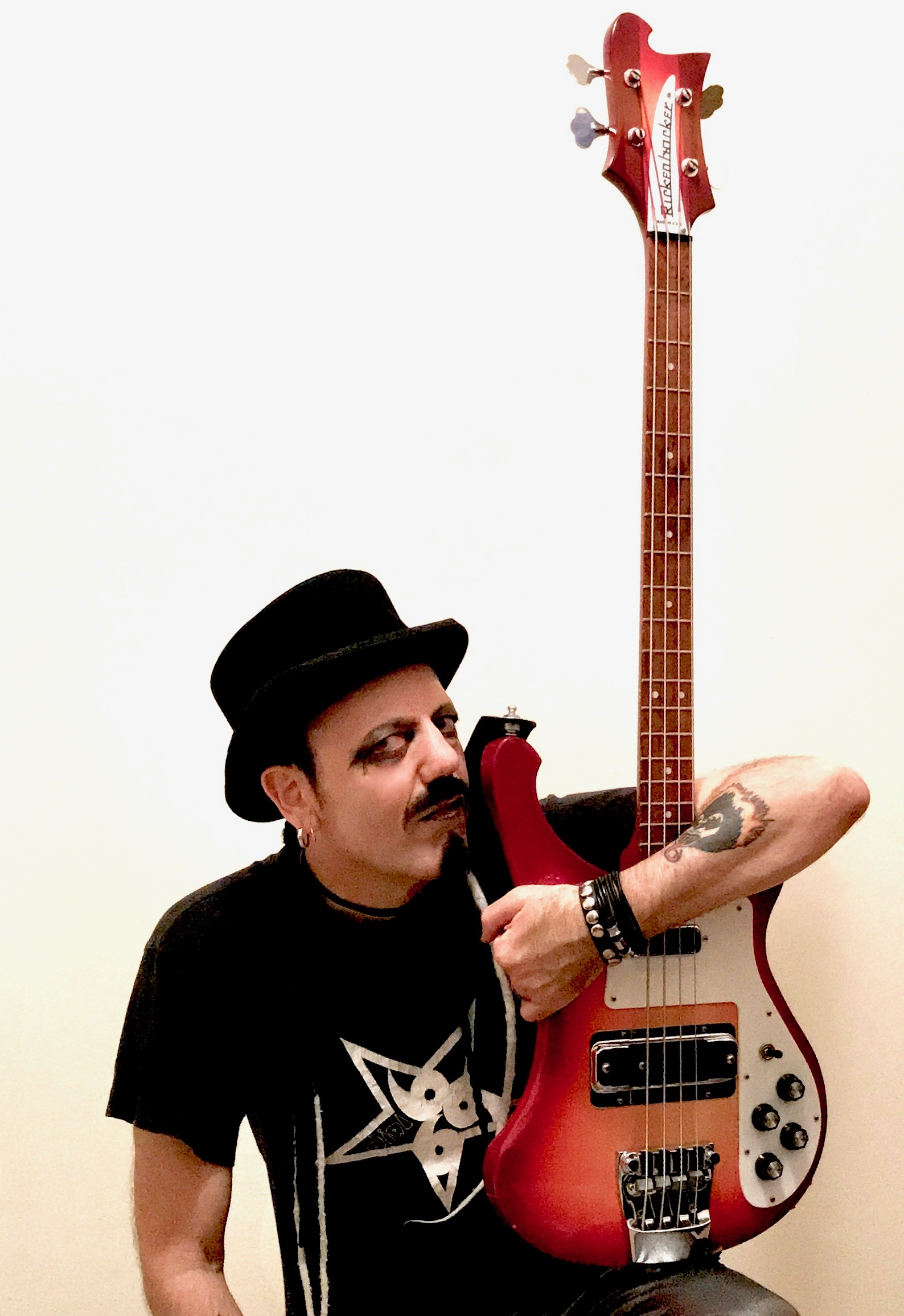
- Dee in 2018

Background information
- Born: Sydney, New South Wales, Australia
- Genres: Industrial rock, alternative rock, alternative metal, gothic rock
- Occupations: Musician, songwriter
- Instruments: Bass guitar, vocals

Leeno Dee is an Australian bassist, singer and songwriter best known for his major label acts Jerk, Candy Harlots and his current band Dept. of Gloom.

== Early life ==
Dee was born in Sydney and started getting into music at the age of 8, "I heard The Sweet and was totally floored-then came Slade, Alice Cooper, Bowie and that whole landslide of British glam". At 12, he began playing guitar and at 16 switched to bass, which became his main instrument." I had always gravitated to the bassist in bands-even when I didn't know what a bss was-they just seemed the coolest, or wackiest- like Steve Priest, from Sweet-then when I saw Gene Simmons on the cover of KISS Alive-I was done for" (BassBusters POD 2020)

== Career ==
=== Dept. of Gloom ===
Dee formed Dept. of Gloom in June 2016 with longtime cohort guitarist Phil Bowley and drummer AJ. In August 2016, the lineup was completed with former Genitorturers guitarist Bizz Tronix. Following a string of shows, the band entered the studio in March–April 2018 to record their debut EP set for release in the second half of 2018. That EP was postponed, and following COVID-19 the band began recording a full-length debut album, set for a mid/late 2022 release. Dept. of Gloom also opened for American hard rockers Skid Row, Hardcore Superstar and others, and also headlined their own shows.

=== Melody Black ===
In 2010, Dee formed Melody Black who released an album - Love Your Demons - on the RIOT label through Warner Music Group. The album featured nine songs all composed by Dee. In 2012, their cover of The Sweet's classic glam anthem Ballroom Blitz reached the number 1 position on iTunes Chart in Australia. Melody Black also toured with various acts, including Rose Tattoo and Misfits.

=== INK ===
In 2006, Dee became part of INK along with former Jerk members Charles Cilia and Jonathan Devoy. They released two CDs: Lead...Or Follow and Black Water Reign, and toured extensively, including runs with Deathstars, 69 Eyes and Skid Row.

=== Jerk ===
In 2000, Dee was asked to join industrial metal band Jerk, recording and releasing their debut self-titled EP in 2001. This led to the band being signed to a worldwide deal with Sony Music. In June, Dee visited Los Angeles where in addition to meeting with several music industry types he attended the Summer Party at Playboy Mansion in Holmby Hills. Jerk then recorded their debut major label album When Pure Is Defiled, which reached No. 31 on the ARIA Charts and spawned two number 1 Triple J singles, I Hate People Like That and Just What You Need. The album was produced in Sydney and Los Angeles with both Mark Opitz (INXS, AC/DC, Steelheart) and Sean Beavan (Nine Inch Nails, Marilyn Manson, Guns N' Roses, Slayer, Depeche Mode) at Beavan's Blue Room Studios in L.A. Jerk toured with Marilyn Manson, Disturbed, Insane Clown Posse, P.O.D. and Killing Joke, amongst others. The band also made many TV appearances including MTV, Rage, Channel V and others, and performed at the ARIA Music Awards in 2003.

=== Candy Harlots ===
Dee's first professional band saw him become the third and final bassist in the Candy Harlots. Following a string of shows including tours with Divinyls, the Angels and AC/DC, and releasing two No. 1 and No. 2 alternative chart singles Red Hot Rocket and Danger, the band signed a deal with Virgin Records. Their album Five Wicked Ways was produced by Peter Blyton (Choirboys). Dee then flew to L.A. for three weeks to oversee the mix sessions with Jeff Hendrickson (Van Halen, Bon Jovi, Joan Jett). The album spawned two charting singles: The Lady Shakes (No. 17 ARIA) and Sister's Crazy (No. 20 ARIA).
