= Jerk (band) =

Australian band

- Origin: Sydney, New South Wales, Australia
- Genres: Industrial metal; nu metal
- Years active: 1998–2004, 2013
- Label: Sony
- Past members: Johnathan Devoy; Ross Empson; Lamar Lowder; Michael Matral; Charles Cilia; Leeno Dee; The Drummer Paul

Jerk were an Australian industrial metal band formed in 1998. They released a sole album, When Pure Is Defiled (April 2003), with the line-up of Charles Cilia, Leeno Dee, Johnathan Devoy and Lamar Lowder, which peaked at No. 38 on the ARIA Albums Chart. Their song "Sucked In" was used in the video games, Need for Speed: Underground and NHL 2004. Jerk supported gigs by Marilyn Manson, Insane Clown Posse, Killing Joke and Disturbed on their respective tours.

== History ==
Jerk were formed in 1998 in Sydney as an industrial goth rock band by vocalist Michael Matral, drummer Lamar Lowder, guitarist Johnathan Devoy and bass player Ross Empson (later in Tourettes). They contributed the track "Jesus Saves" to the Mushroom Records soundtrack to the Australian horror feature film, Cut, in 2000. In June 2000, Jerk had a line-up change with Devoy now on lead vocals and Lowder still on drums, joined by guitarist Charles Cilia and former Candy Harlots bass guitarist Leeno Dee.

In 2001, Jerk released a self-titled six-track extended play with three accompanying music videos, directed by Lowder. These led to an appearance at the Metal for the Brain festival in Canberra late in the year. In April 2002 Jerk signed to Sony Records.

In 2003, Jerk with the line-up of Cilia, Dee, Devoy and Lowder, issued their full-length album When Pure Is Defiled, which was co-produced by Sean Beavan and Lamar Lowder. The album reached No. 38 on the ARIA Albums Chart in April, as well as No. 8 on the ARIA Australasian Artists Albums and No. 6 on the ARIA Heavy Rock & Metal Albums charts. Lowder had also produced work by Chainsuck and Engines of Aggression.

It included their 2002 single, "I Hate People Like That", which peaked at No. 83 on the ARIA Singles Chart in November. Music videos were subsequently provided for "I Hate People Like That", "Just What You Need" and the Lowder-directed "My Friends All Lie".

Jerk embarked on a national tour in 2003 to promote the album and performances included support slots for Marilyn Manson, Insane Clown Posse, Killing Joke and Disturbed at the Sydney gig of their Australian tours. Jerk received exposure in the North American market when their song, "Sucked In", was used in the video games, NHL 2004 and Need for Speed: Underground.

Devoy stepped down, and was replaced by vocalist, Mario Spate, early in 2004, but the band broke up by the end of the year. Lowder returned to music production and song writing. In January 2006 Cilia, Dee and Devoy formed another band called Ink, which dropped the industrial sound. Ink subsequently released two EPs, Lead… or Follow (2007) and Black Water Reign (2008). On 21 July 2013 Cilia, Dee and Devoy reunited for a one-off acoustic, Jerk gig.

== Members ==
- Johnathan Devoy – guitars (1998–2000), vocals (2000–2004)
- Charles Cilia – guitars (2000–2004)
- Leeno Dee – bass (2000–2004)
- Lamar Lowder – drums (1998–2004)
- Mario Spate – vocals (2004)

=== Former members ===
- Ross Empson – bass (1998–2000)
- Michael Matral – vocals (1998–2000)

== Discography ==
=== Albums ===
List of albums, with Australian chart positions
Title	Album details	Peak chart positions
Title	Album details	AUS
When Pure Is Defiled	Released: April 2003; Label: Sony (5119-512000); Format: CD	38

=== Extended plays ===
List of EPs, with selected details
Title	Details
Jerk	Released: 2001; Label: Theory Recordings; Format: CD

=== Singles ===
List of singles, with Australian chart positions
Title	Year	Peak chart positions	Album
Title	Year	AUS	Album
"I Hate People Like That"	2002	83	When Pure Is Defiled
