= The Adam Hole and Marji Curran Band =

Australian blues/roots band

Marji Curran Band
- Origin: Canberra. Australia
- Genres: Rock, R&B, blues
- Label: Independent
- Past members: Marji Curran (Guitar/Vox), Dave Williams (Guitar/Vox), Peter Bucke (Bass), Phoebe Juskevics (Drums)Adam Hole (Guitar), Will Pippin (drums), Dylan Harding (drums)

The Marji Curran Band, once known as The Adam Hole and Marji Curran Band, are an independent Canberra-based blues/roots band consisting of Marji Curran on guitar/vocals, Dave Williams on slide guitar/vocals, Peter Bucke on bass and Dyland Harding on drums. Previously Adam Hole played guitar with Will Pippin and Phoebe Juskevics on drums/percussion.

The band formed in 2004 and have played sell out performances at The Bay Of Islands Jazz and Blues Festival in New Zealand, The Toyota Gympie Muster in QLD, and regularly tour Tasmania, Western Australia and the east coast of Australia.

Based upon their live shows, they have been described as "one of Australia’s most exciting new roots acts"

The band has played alongside some of Australia’s top artists including Jeff Lang, Angry Anderson, Jenny Morris, and Dallas Frasca.

The band has been described as "getting audiences stirred up all over Australia and beyond with their high energy, foot stomping roots, blues and rock. White hot raunchy slide, powerful vocals and driving beats get people up on their feet with an uncontrollable urge to move every part of their bodies" and "a fusion of different genres (that has) created a new sound of their own which is refreshingly unique".

Hole left the band in 2012 and was replaced by guitarist Dave Williams. Phoebe Juskevics also left the band the following year and was replaced by drummer Will Pippin. Pippin left the band in 2013 and was replaced by Dylan Harding. The band has recently toured New Zealand playing to packed venues and is a favourite at blues festivals on the east coast of Australia. The band ceased to exist in 2018.

== Discography ==
- Red Album- (The Adam Hole and Marji Curran Band)- Take It Back/ Cant Find My Way/ Nothin’ New Under The Sun/ Fitzgerald Lane/ Spoonful/ My Own Shelter/ Nobody’s Fault But Mine/ Save Me/ Turning Of The Season/ Travelin’ (Adam Hole Records 2010)
- The River- (Marji Curran Trio)- Sweet sounding music/ Jolene/ Secret remedy/ Gotta lotta love/ Little monster/ Catholic school girl/ Summertime/ The River/ Hard headed woman/ The ones we left behind (Adam Hole records 2007)
- Why Not- (Adam Hole)- Was/ Not Expendable/ Harp/ Voodoo Chile/ Elvis Is Still Dead/ Gallop/ Going Out West/ Why Not/ Rollin' & Tumblin'/ Steel On Steel/ Baby Please Don't Go (Adam Hole Records 2006)
