= Simon Frith =

British sociomusicologist and critic (born 1946)

Simon Frith OBE
- Born: 1946 (age 79–80)

Academic background
- Education: University of Oxford
- Alma mater: University of California, Berkeley

Academic work
- Discipline: Sociomusicology

Simon Webster Frith OBE (born 1946) is a British sociomusicologist and rock critic who specializes in popular music culture. He is professor emeritus of Music at the University of Edinburgh. Frith has written a number of sociological analyses of popular music, including The Sociology of Rock (1978) and Performing Rites: On the value of popular music (1996). Frith was the chair of the Mercury Prize from its inception in 1992 until his resignation in 2016.

== Career ==
As a student, he read philosophy, politics and economics at the University of Oxford and earned a doctorate in sociology from the University of California, Berkeley. He is the author of many books, including The Sociology of Rock (Constable, 1978), Sound Effects: Youth, Leisure and the Politics of Rock 'n' Roll (Pantheon, 1981), Art into Pop (Methuen, 1987 – written with Howard Horne), Music for Pleasure: Essays on the Sociology of Pop (Cambridge University Press, 1988), and Performing Rites: On the Value of Popular Music (Oxford University Press, 1996). He has also co-edited key anthologies in the interdisciplinary field of popular music studies, including: On Record: Rock, Pop & the Written Word (Routledge, 1990), Sound and Vision: Music Video Reader (Routledge, 1993), and The Cambridge Companion to Pop and Rock (Cambridge University Press, 2001).

Frith has edited a four-volume set, Popular Music: Critical Concepts in Media & Cultural Studies (Routledge, 2004), and published a collection of his key essays, Taking Popular Music Seriously: Selected Essays (Ashgate, 2007). He is the co-author of a three-volume work, The History of Live Music in Britain since 1950, by Ashgate.

Frith has chaired the judges of the Mercury Music Prize since it began in 1992 until his resignation in 2016. His popular music criticism has appeared in a range of popular presses including The Village Voice and The Sunday Times. He taught in the Sociology Department at the University of Warwick and the English Studies Department at Strathclyde University. In 1999, he went to the University of Stirling as Professor of Film and Media. In 2006, he took up his last post, Tovey Chair of Music at the University of Edinburgh, from which he retired and was appointed professor emeritus in 2017. He is the brother of guitarist and composer Fred Frith and neuroscientist Chris Frith.

According to author Bernard Gendron, writing in his 2002 book Between Montmartre and the Mudd Club: Popular Music and the Avant-Garde, Frith "has done the most to lay the foundations for the analysis of rock criticism". Frith was appointed Officer of the Order of the British Empire (OBE) in the 2017 New Year Honours for services to higher education and popular music.

== The Sociology of Rock ==
In The Sociology of Rock (1978) Frith examines the consumption, production, and ideology of rock music. He explores rock as leisure, as youth culture, as a force for liberation or oppression, and as background music. He argues that rock music is a mass cultural form which derives its meaning and relevance from being a mass medium. He discusses the differences in perception and use of rock between the music industry and music consumers, as well as differences within those groups: "The industry may or may not keep control of rock's use, but it will not be able to determine all its meanings – the problems of capitalist community and leisure are not so easily resolved."

== "Bad music" ==
Frith (2004, p. 17-9) argued that "'bad music' is a necessary concept for musical pleasure, for musical aesthetics." He distinguishes two common kinds of bad music; the first is the Worst Records Ever Made type, which includes:

- "Tracks which are clearly incompetent musically; made by singers who can't sing, players who can't play, producers who can't produce,"
- "Tracks involving genre confusion. The most common examples are actors or TV stars recording in the latest style."

The second type is the "rock critical list", which includes:

- "Tracks that feature sound gimmicks that have outlived their charm or novelty,"
- "Tracks that depend on false sentiment (...), that feature an excess of feeling molded into a radio-friendly pop song."

He later gives three common qualities attributed to bad music: inauthentic, [in] bad taste (see also: kitsch), and stupid. He argues that "The marking off of some tracks and genres and artists as 'bad' is a necessary part of popular music pleasure; it is a way we establish our place in various music worlds. And 'bad' is a key word here because it suggests that aesthetic and ethical judgements are tied together here: not to like a record is not just a matter of taste; it is also a matter of argument, and argument that matters." (p. 28)

== "Four social functions of popular music" ==
In "Towards an Aesthetic of Popular Music" Simon Frith (1987) presents four social functions that, in part, account for popular music's value in society. They are as follows:

1. We enjoy popular music because of its use in answering questions of identity.
2. To give us a way of managing the relationship between our public and private emotional lives.
3. To shape popular memory, to organize our sense of time.
4. Popular music is something possessed.

== Sources ==
- Frith, Simon (1978). The Sociology of Rock. ISBN 0-09-460220-4
- Frith, Simon. "What is Bad Music" in Washburne, Christopher J. and Derno, Maiken (eds.) (2004). Bad Music: The Music We Love to Hate. New York: Routledge. ISBN 0-415-94366-3.
- Frith, Simon (1996). Performing Rites: On the Value of Popular Music.
- Frith, S., Brennan, M., Cloonan, M., and Webster, E. (2013). The History of Live Music in Britain, Volume I: 1950–1967: From Dance Hall to the 100 Club. Aldershot: Ashgate. ISBN 978-1-4094-2280-8.
