= Merpire =

Australian musical artist

- Born: Rhiannon Atkinson-Howatt; Sydney, New South Wales, Australia
- Genres: Alternative rock; dream pop; indie pop
- Years active: 2017–present
- Label: ADA
- Member of: Rat!hammock
- Website: merpiremusic.com

Rhiannon Atkinson-Howatt, known professionally as Merpire, is an Australian singer-songwriter and guitarist based in Melbourne. She began releasing music independently in 2017 and has since released one extended play, Endless Chatter (2018), and two studio albums, Simulation Ride (2021) and Milk Pool (2025). She is also a touring member of indie rock band Rat!hammock.

== Career ==
Rhiannon Atkinson-Howatt grew up in Sydney and began writing songs in high school. In 2015, she won the Telstra Road to Discovery talent competition, being awarded a trip to Nashville, Tennessee and a marketing arrangement with Mushroom Records. She moved to Melbourne a few years later to be surrounded by a more dedicated music scene. In 2018, she released her debut extended play, Endless Chatter.

In the throes of the COVID-19 pandemic, Atkinson-Howatt founded Isol-Aid, a live-streamed music festival on Instagram which 80 artists participated in over one weekend in its inaugural year. She stepped back after its third iteration, to focus on the recording of her debut album, Simulation Ride. It was produced by James Seymour, her romantic partner at the time. The album released in 2021 to critical acclaim.

Atkinson-Howatt is long-time friends with the Melbourne indie rock band Rat!hammock, and has regularly joined them on stage since 2022.

Atkinson-Howatt released her second studio album, Milk Pool, in 2025. It features a darker pop and alternative rock sound compared to Simulation Ride, written during a relationship breakdown. Its title is in reference to a gag on The Simpsons.

== Influences ==
Speaking about the influences for her guitar writing, she cites the bands Creed, Nickelback, Pearl Jam and Nirvana.

== Discography ==
Studio albums

- Simulation Ride (ADA, 23 July 2021)
- Milk Pool (Self-released, 4 July 2025)

Extended plays

- Endless Chatter (Self-released, 22 June 2018)
- After the Party (Live) (ADA, 23 September 2022)
