= Gaelic Theatre =

Coordinates: 33.885723°S 151.207377°E

The Gaelic Theatre
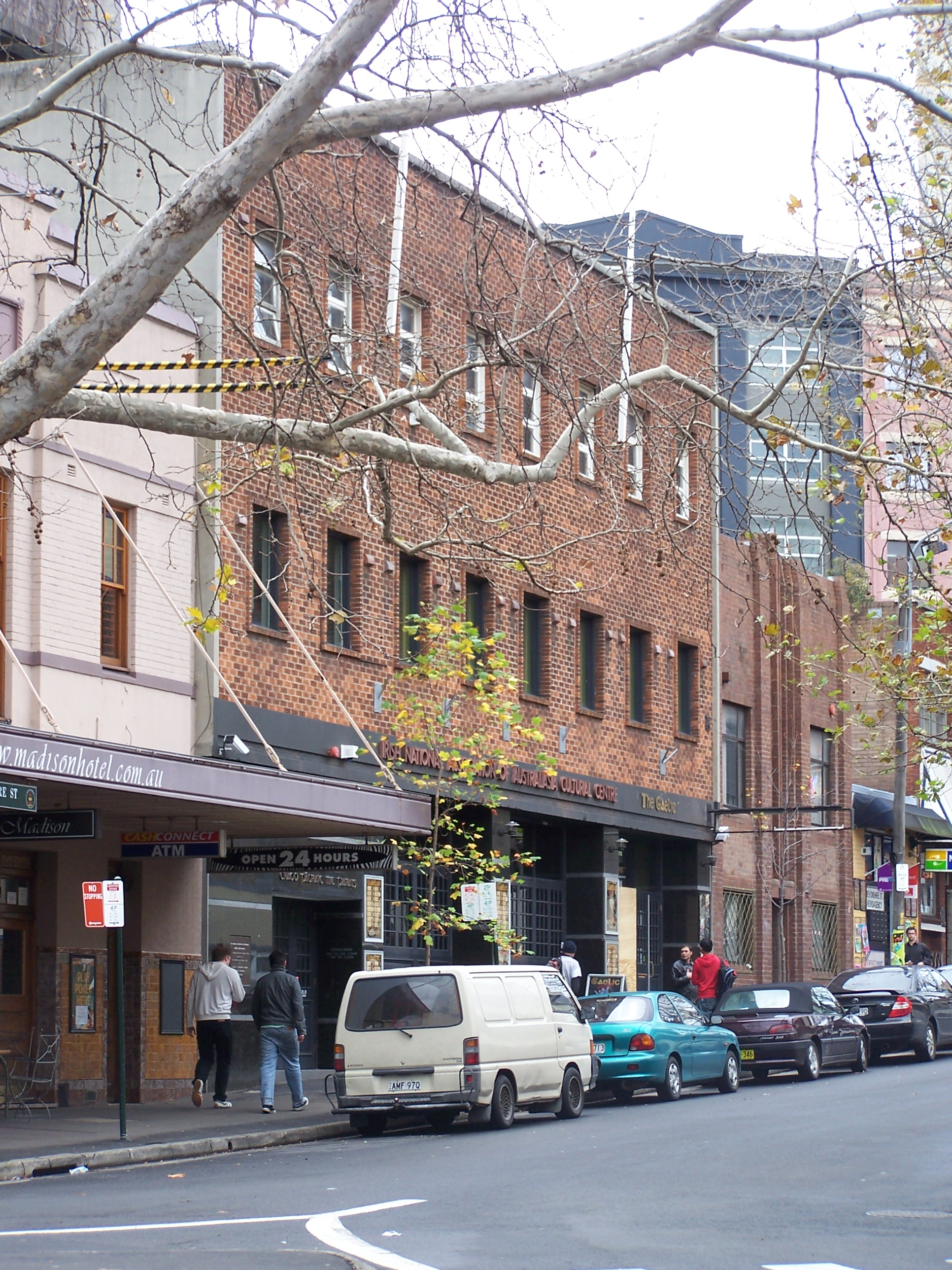
- The Gaelic Theatre
- Interactive map of The Gaelic Theatre
- Location: 64 Devonshire Street, Surry Hills, Sydney
- Capacity: 800

Construction
- Opened: 2002

Website
- www.gaelicclub.com.au

The Gaelic Theatre is a split level multi purpose venue in Surry Hills, New South Wales, Australia. The theatre is located on the ground floor of INA House, close to Central railway station and was voted "Best Live Music Venue - NSW" at the 2007 Jack Awards.

The theatre has a capacity of 800 and has hosted a number of international and Australian touring bands, among them The Strokes, The Libertines, The Darkness, Jet, Maroon 5, Hot Hot Heat, The Kills, MC5, The Wildhearts, American rock quintet The Used, Glenn Hughes (HTP/ex-Deep Purple/Trapeze), super FLORENCE jam, British India, The Mess Hall, Children Collide, You Am I, Battles and Captain Kickarse and the Awesomes, amongst others.

The theatre was opened as an entertainment venue in 2002 as part of the Gaelic Club (located on the first floor), but had been previously used as a cinema and also for stage performances. It was originally built in 1957 by the Irish National Association of Australasia as hall to service the Irish community in Sydney. In 2006, the ground floor was sold by the Irish National Association, and it re-opened under the name of The Gaelic Theatre.

The theatre is located on Devonshire Street, Surry Hills and is in the vicinity of the old Devonshire Street Cemetery, which was moved during the construction of Central railway station in 1906.

The Gaelic Theatre is one of the most popular live music venues in Sydney, and has been recognised for its credibility and goodwill.
