= Leigh Landy =

Dutch composer

Leigh Landy (born 1951) is a composer and musicologist of Dutch and American citizenship. He holds a Research Chair at De Montfort University where he directs the Music, Technology and Innovation Research Centre.

== Composition ==
Landy's compositions include several works for video, dance and theatre. He has worked extensively with the late playwright, Heiner Müller, the new media artist, Michel Jaffrennou and the composer-performer, Jos Zwaanenburg. He was composer in residence for the Dutch National Theatre during its first years of existence and is currently co-director of Idée Fixe – Experimental Sound and Movement Theatre with the choreographer, Evelyn Jamieson. A complete list of his compositions, recordings, publications and other creative endeavours can be found on his personal website.

== Musicology ==
Landy's musicological publications focus on studies of electroacoustic music, including the notion of musical dramaturgy, contemporary music in a cross-arts context, access and the contemporary time-based arts, and devising practices in the performing arts. He is editor of the international journal of music technology Organised Sound (Cambridge University Press) and author of over 100 articles (see his personal website) and eight books including:

- What’s the Matter with Today’s Experimental Music? (Routledge, 1991)
- Experimental Music Notebooks (Routledge, 1994)
- Devising Dance and Music: Idée Fixe – Experimental Sound and Movement Theatre (Sunderland, 2000, now on the author's website)
- Understanding the Art of Sound Organization (MIT Press, 2007)
- La musique des sons/The Music of Sounds (Sorbonne MINT/OMF, 2007)
- Making Music with Sounds (Routledge, 2012)
- ‘Compose Your Words’ eBook (Intelligent Arts, New York, 2014)
- Expanding the Horizon of Electroacoustic Music Analysis Simon Emmerson, Leigh Landy, Eds. (Cambridge University Press, 2017)

He directs the ElectroAcoustic Resource Site (EARS) project and is a founding member of the Electroacoustic Music Studies Network (EMS).
