= Back from the Grave, Volume 2 =

1983 compilation album

Compilation album
- Released: 1983
- Recorded: 1960s
- Genres: Garage rock; protopunk
- Label: Crypt

chronology
Back from the Grave (1983)	Back from the Grave, Volume 2 (1983)	Back from the Grave, Volume 3 (1984)

Back from the Grave, Volume 2 is the second installment in the Back from the Grave series of garage rock compilations put together by Tim Warren of Crypt Records on LP. It was released in 1983. In keeping with all of the entries in the series, and as indicated in the subheading which reads "16 Garage Punkers," this collection consists of songs which display the rawer and more aggressive side of the genre and are often characterized by the use of fuzztone-distorted guitars and rough vocals. The set generally excludes psychedelic, folk rock, and pop-influenced material in favor of basic primitive rock and roll. The packaging features well-researched liner notes written by Tim Warren which convey basic information about each song and group, such as origin, recording date, and biographical sketches, usually written in a conversational style that includes occasional slang, anecdotes, humorous asides. The liner notes are noticeably opinionated, sometimes engaging in tongue-in-cheek insults directed at other genres of music. The packaging also includes photographs of the bands, and the front cover features a highly satirical cartoon by Mort Todd depicting revivified "rock and roll" zombies who have just emerged from the grave to "burn on a skewer" all adherents of supposedly heretical pop and progressive music which have come to prominence over the years, such as disco.

The set begins with "Victim of Circumstances," by Roy Junior, who is none other than Roy Acuff Jr., the son of country music legend Roy Acuff. The song was written by Don Turnbow, who also wrote "Hipsville B.C." for Texas band the Sparkles. Detroit's the Unrelated Segments sing "Cry, Cry, Cry." The Outsiders from Tampa, Florida perform "She's Coming On Stronger," The liner notes recount an incident where the group's van turned upside down when they were on a trip to play in Birmingham Alabama and the band members ended up in jail. "(Would I Still Be) Her Big Man," by the Brigands, is about a man who dates a beautiful woman with expensive tastes, and pretends that he is wealthy, but wonders if she would accept him if she finds out that he works in a factory. The set concludes with "Crater Sota," by the Thunderbirds.

== Track listing ==
=== Side one ===
1. Roy Junior: "Victim of Circumstances" (Don Turnbow) 2:20
2. The Unrelated Segments: "Cry, Cry, Cry" 3:00
3. The Mystics: "Snoopy" 2:24
4. The Banshees: "They Prefer Blondes" 2:25
5. The Hatfields: "Yes I Do" 2:10
6. The Outsiders: "She's Coming on Stronger" 2:19
7. The Mods: "Satisfaction" 3:45
8. The Lyrics: "They Can't Hurt Me" 2:43

=== Side two ===
1. The Brigands: "(Would I Still Be) Her Big Man" 2:19
2. The Children of Darkness: "She's Mine" 2:36
3. The Canadian Rogues: "Keep In Touch" 2:18
4. The Outsiders: "Summertime Blues" 2:35
5. The Reasons Why: "All I Really Need Is Love" 2:07
6. The Triumphs: "Surfside Date" 1:43
7. Ralph Nielsen & The Chancellors: "Scream" 1:56
8. The Novas: "The Crusher" 2:07
9. The Thunderbirds: "Crater Soda" 2:24

== Catalogue and release information ==
- Long playing record (Crypt LP-002, rel. 1983)

== Back from the Grave, Volumes 1 and 2 (CD) ==
Back from the Grave, Volumes 1 and 2 (CD)

Compilation album
- Released: 2015
- Recorded: 1960s
- Genres: Garage rock; protopunk
- Label: Crypt

chronology
Back from the Grave, Volumes 1 and 2 (CD) (2015)	Back from the Grave, Volumes 3 and 4 (CD) (2005)

Back from the Grave, Volumes 1 and 2 (CD) is a newly re-mastered CD that combines into one disc volumes 1 and 2 of the original 1983 LPs in the Back from the Grave series of garage rock compilations out by Tim Warren of Crypt Records. This CD was released in 2015. It is not to be confused with the older Back from the Grave, Volume 1 and Back from the Grave, Volume 2 CDs released in 1996, which differed dramatically from their LP counterparts in terms of track selection. This new CD is a part of a new Back from the Grave sub-series of CDs which attempts to more faithfully replicate the song selection original LPs, bringing the series for the first time into multi-media coherence. Like the LPs, the packaging features well-researched liner notes written by Tim Warren which convey basic information about each song and group, such as origin, recording date, and biographical sketches. The packaging also includes photographs of the bands, and the front cover (taken from the Volume 1 LP) features a highly satirical cartoon by Mort Todd. The track list to the Volumes 1 and 2 CD is similar to the corresponding LPs, but there are some differences.

== Track listing ==
1. The Elite: "My Confusion" 2:12
2. The JuJus: "Do You Understand Me" 2:29
3. The Alarm Clocks: "Yeah" (M. Pierce) 2:45
4. The Alarm Clocks: "No Reason to Complain" (M. Pierce) 2:12
5. The Fabs: "That's the Bag I'm In" (Fred Neil) 2:23
6. The Malibus: "Cry" 2:15
7. The Bel-Aires: "Ya Ha Be Be"
8. The Legends: "I'll Come Again" 2:07
9. The Rats: "Rat's Revenge, Pt. 1" 3:11
10. The Rats: Rat's Revenge, Pt. 2" 2:34
11. The One Way Streets: "We All Love Peanut Butter" 2:47
12. Larry & the Blue Notes: "Night of the Phantom" 2:11
13. The One Way Streets: "Jack Ripper" 2:20
14. The Swamp Rats: "Psycho" (Gerald Roslie) 2:55
15. The Cords: "Ghost Power" 3:02
16. The Outsiders: "Summertime Blues"
17. The Banshees: "They Prefer Blondes" 2:25
18. Unknown Artist: "Little By Little"
19. The Hatfields: "Yes I Do" 2:10
20. The Reasons Why: "All I Really Need is Love" 2:07
21. Ralph Nielsen & The Chancellors: "Scream"
22. The Mystics: "Snoopy" 2:24
23. The Lyrics: "They Can't Hurt Me" 2:43
24. The Hysterics: "Won't Get Far"
25. The Lyrics: "They Can't Hurt Me"
26. The Canadian Rogues: "Keep In Touch" 2:18
27. Sweet Cherry Funny: "Things Floating"
28. The Outsiders: "She's Coming on Stronger" 2:19
29. The Mods: "Satisfaction" 3:45
30. The Deverons: "On The Road Again"
31. The Children of Darkness: "She's Mine" 2:36

== Catalogue and release information ==
- Compact disc (Crypt CD, rel. 2015)
