= Back from the Grave, Volume 3 =

1984 compilation album

Back from the Grave, Volumes 3

Compilation album
- Released: 1984
- Recorded: 1960s
- Genres: Garage rock; protopunk
- Label: Crypt

chronology
Back from the Grave, Volume 2 (1983)	Back from the Grave, Volumes 3 (1984)	Back from the Grave, Volume 4 (1984)

Back from the Grave, Volume 3 is the third installment in the Back from the Grave series of garage rock compilations put together by Tim Warren of Crypt Records. It was released in 1984. In keeping with all of the entries in the series, and as indicated in the subheading which reads "Mid 60s Garage Punkers," this collection consists of songs which display the rawer and more aggressive side of the genre and are often characterized by the use of fuzztone-distorted guitars and rough vocals. The set generally excludes psychedelic, folk rock, and pop-influenced material in favor of basic primitive rock and roll. The packaging features well-researched liner notes written by Tim Warren which convey basic information about each song and group, such as origin, recording date, and biographical sketches, usually written in a conversational style that includes occasional slang, anecdotes, humorous asides. The liner notes are noticeably opinionated, sometimes engaging in tongue-in-cheek insults directed at other genres of music. The packaging also includes photographs of the bands, and the front cover features a highly satirical cartoon by Mort Todd depicting revivified "rock and roll" zombies who have just emerged from the grave to "drop in a pit" all adherents of supposedly "heretical" pop and progressive music which have come to prominence over the years.

The set begins with "Be My Queen" by the Chentelles from Western Michigan. "I've Got Something to Say," by the Interns from Akron, Ohio, received a regional airplay, and the group even made a local TV appearance. The Monacles from Orange County, California also appeared on a local TV show in their area and perform "I Can't Win." "Don't Cry to Me," by Jerry & the Others, from Dayton, Ohio is set to pounding Bo Diddley rhythms and scintillating guitar parts. Murphy & the Mob from Tyler, Texas sing the highly despondent "Born Loser," which was released on Talisman Records in 1966. The set ends with "You Can't Make Me," by the Montells from Miami, Florida, who had previously recorded as H.M. Subjects (Her Majesty's Subjects).

== Track listing ==
=== Side one ===
1. The Chentelles: "Be My Queen"
2. Little Willie and the Adolescents: "Get Out of My Life"
3. Ken and the Fourth Dimension: "See If I Care"
4. Me And Them Guys: "I Loved Her So"
5. The Interns: "I've Got Something to Say"
6. The Intruders Five: "Ain't Comin' Back"
7. The Monacles: "I Can't Win"
8. Lil' Boys Blue: "I'm Not There"

=== Side two ===
1. Jerry and the Others: "Don't Cry to Me"
2. The Fugitives: "You Can't Blame That on Me"
3. The Raunch Hands: "Tiger Guitars"
4. William the Wild One: "Willie the Wild One"
5. Murphy and the Mob: "Born Loser"
6. The Mods: "You've Got Another Thing Comin'"
7. Sir Winston and the Commons: "We're Gonna Love"
8. The Royal Flairs: "Suicide"
9. The Montells: "You Can't Make Me"

== Catalogue and release information ==
- Long playing record (Crypt LP-003, rel. 1984)

== Back from the Grave, Volumes 3 and 4 (CD) ==
Back from the Grave, Volumes 3 and 4 (CD)

Compilation album
- Released: 2015
- Recorded: 1960s
- Genres: Garage rock; protopunk
- Label: Crypt

chronology
Back from the Grave, Volumes 1 and 2 (CD) (2005)	Back from the Grave, Volumes 3 and 4 (CD) (2015)	Back from the Grave, Volumes 5 and 6 (CD) (2005)

Back from the Grave, Volumes 3 and 4 (CD) is a remastered CD that combines into one disc volumes 3 and 4 of the original 1983 and 1984 LPs in the Back from the Grave series of garage rock compilations out by Tim Warren of Crypt Records. This CD was released in 2015. It is not to be confused with the older Back from the Grave, Volume 3 and Back from the Grave, Volume 4 CDs released from 1996-2000, which differed dramatically from their LP counterparts in terms of track selection. This new CD is a part of a new Back from the Grave sub-series of CDs which attempts to more faithfully replicate the song selection original LPs, bringing the series for the first time into multi-media coherence. Like the LPs, the packaging features well-researched liner notes written by Tim Warren which convey basic information about each song and group, such as origin, recording date, and biographical sketches. The track list to the Volumes 3 and 4 CD is similar to the corresponding LPs, but there are some differences.

== Track listing ==
1. Little Willie and the Adolescents: "Get Out of My Life"
2. The Chentelles: "Be My Queen"
3. Ken and the Fourth Dimension: "See if I Care"
4. The Fugitives: "You Can't Blame That on Me"
5. Me and Them Guys: "I Loved Her So"
6. The Intruders Five: "Ain't Comin' Back"
7. The Monacles: "I Can't Win"
8. Lil' Boys Blue: "I'm Not There"
9. Jerry and the Others: "Don't Cry to Me"
10. The Royal Flairs: "Suicide"
11. Murphy and the Mob: "Born Loser"
12. The Mods: "You've Got Another Thing Comin'"
13. The Interns: "I've Got Something to Say"
14. Sir Winston and the Commons: "We're Gonna Love"
15. The Montells: "You Can't Make Me"
16. The Tamrons: "Wild-Man"
17. The Cyclones: "She's No Good"
18. The Fabs: "Dinah Wants Religion"
19. Red Beard and The Pirates: "Go on Leave"
20. The Hallmarks: "I Know Why"
21. Rocky & The Riddlers: "Flash and Crash"
22. Tonto and the Renegades: "Little Boy Blue"
23. The Botumless Pit: "13 Stories High"
24. The Aztex: "I Said Move"
25. The Nomads: "Be Nice"
26. Bunker Hill: "The Girl Can't Dance"
27. The Sloths: "Makin' Love"
28. The Wyld: 'Fly by Nighter"
29. The Vectors: "What in the World"
30. The Huns: "Shakedown"

== Catalogue and release information ==
- Compact disc (Crypt CD, rel. 2015)
