= Back from the Grave Part One =

- U.S. release front cover, titled Volume One and using the artwork of the 1983 LP

Compilation album
- Released: February 1993 (Germany); August 23, 1996 (U.S.)
- Recorded: 1960s
- Genres: Garage rock; protopunk
- Length: 1:08:49
- Label: Crypt

chronology
n. a.	Back from the Grave Part One (1993)	Back from the Grave Part 2 (1993)

Back from the Grave Part One (in the U.S. released as Volume One) is the first installment in the Back from the Grave four compact disc-exclusive series of garage rock compilations put together by Tim Warren of Crypt Records. It was released in February 1993 in Germany and on August 23, 1996 in the U.S. Its track listing differs from that of the LP version, which is part of the Back From the Grave LP-edition series, also on Crypt. In keeping with all of the entries in the series, and as indicated in the subheading which reads "Raw 'n' Crude Mid-60s Garage Punk!," this collection consists of songs which display the rawer and more aggressive side of the genre and are often characterized by the use of fuzztone-distorted guitars and rough vocals. The set generally excludes psychedelic, folk rock, and pop-influenced material in favor of basic primitive rock and roll. The packaging features a booklet containing well-researched liner notes written by Tim Warren which conveys basic information about each song and group, such as origin, recording date, and biographical sketches, usually written in a conversational style that includes occasional slang, anecdotes, humorous asides. The liner notes are noticeably opinionated, sometimes engaging in tongue-in-cheek insults directed at other genres of music. The booklet also includes photographs of the bands, and the front cover features a highly satirical cartoon by Mort Todd depicting a revivified "rock and roll" zombie who, along with his macabre cohorts, has just emerged from the grave to "bury" all specimens of supposedly "heretical" pop and progressive music which have come to prominence over the years, such as disco music and MTV.

The set begins with "My Confusion", by The Elite from Fort Worth Texas. "Do You Understand Me," was their last release by Grand Rapids, Michigan's The JuJus. Two songs by the Alarm Clocks from Parma, Ohio are included, "Yeah" and "No Reason to Complain"—both recorded at Sound Ideas Recording Studio in Cleveland. The Fabs from Fullerton, California, are sometimes mistaken for being from Texas, perhaps because the cut, "That's the Bag I'm In," though recorded in Hollywood, was released on the Dallas-based Cottonball label. The Malibus from Providence, Rhode Island can be heard on the fuzz-drenched "Cry" and the Legends from Holland, Michigan, play "I'll Come Again," which was recorded in 1965 but not released until 1967 on Fenton Records. Several of the odder cuts are the "We All Love Peanut Butter" and a take on "Jack the Ripper," both done by the One Way Streets and "Rat's Revenge Part One" and "Rat's Revenge Part Two" by the Rats. The Swamp Rats, from Pittsburgh do a rendition of the Sonics's "Pycho." Detroit's the Unrelated Segments sing "Cry, Cry, Cry." The Monacles from Orange County, California perform "I Can't Win," and the Lil' Boys Blue, from Sunnyvale, California, close the set with "I'm Not There."

== Track listing ==
1. The Elite: "My Confusion" 2:12
2. The JuJus: "Do You Understand Me" 2:29
3. The Alarm Clocks: "Yeah" (M. Pierce) 2:45
4. The Alarm Clocks: "No Reason to Complain" (M. Pierce) 2:12
5. The Fabs: "That's the Bag I'm In" (Fred Neil) 2:23
6. The Malibus: "Cry" 2:15
7. The Legends: "I'll Come Again" 2:07
8. The Rats: "Rat's Revenge, Pt. 1" 3:11
9. The Rats: "Rat's Revenge, Pt. 2" 2:34
10. The One Way Streets: "We All Love Peanut Butter" 2:47
11. Larry and the Blue Notes: "Night of the Phantom" 2:11
12. The One Way Streets: "Jack Ripper" 2:20
13. The Swamp Rats: "Psycho" (Gerald Roslie) 2:55
14. The Outsiders: "Summertime Blues" (Jerry Capehart / Eddie Cochran) 2:49
15. The Banshees: "They Prefer Blondes" 2:25
16. The Triumphs "Surfside Date" 1:44
17. Ralph Nielsen & The Chancellors: "Scream" 1:58
18. The Novas: "The Crusher" (Bob Nolan) 1:59
19. The Lyrics: "They Can't Hurt Me" 2:50
20. The Canadian Rogues: "Keep in Touch" 2:15
21. The Unrelated Segments: "Cry Cry Cry" (Ron Stults) 3:04
22. The Hatfields: "Yes I Do" 2:13
23. The Chantelles: "Be My Queen" 2:07
24. Little Willie & the Adolescents: "Get Out of My Life" 2:12
25. Ken & the 4th Dimension: "See If I Care" 2:13
26. Me & Them Guys: "I Loved Her So" 2:12
27. The Intruders Five: "Ain't Comin' Back" 2:21
28. The Monocles: "I Can't Win" 2:11
29. The Lil' Boys Blue: "I'm Not There" 1:55

== Catalogue and release information ==
- Compact disc (CRYPT CD-0123, rel. 1993)
