= Back from the Grave, Volume 4 =

1984 compilation album

Back from the Grave, Volumes 4

Compilation album
- Released: 1984
- Recorded: 1960s
- Genres: Garage rock; protopunk
- Label: Crypt

chronology
Back from the Grave, Volume 3 (1983)	Back from the Grave, Volumes 4 (1984)	Back from the Grave, Volume 5 (1985)

Back from the Grave, Volume 4 is the fourth installment in the Back from the Grave series of garage rock compilations assembled by Tim Warren of Crypt Records. It was released in 1984. In keeping with all of the entries in the series, and as indicated in the subheading which reads "Wild Mid-60s Garage Punk Screamers," this collection consists of songs which display the rawer and more aggressive side of the genre and are often characterized by the use of fuzztone-distorted guitars and rough vocals. The set generally excludes psychedelic, folk rock, and pop-influenced material in favor of basic primitive rock and roll. The packaging features well-researched liner notes written by Tim Warren which convey basic information about each song and group, such as origin, recording date, and biographical sketches, usually written in a conversational style that includes occasional slang, anecdotes, humorous asides. The liner notes are noticeably opinionated, sometimes engaging in tongue-in-cheek insults directed at other genres of music. The packaging also includes photographs of the bands, and the front cover features a highly satirical cartoon by Mort Todd depicting revivified "rock and roll" zombies who, on this occasion, with the help of Batman's sidekick, Robin, have taken the 1966 TV series Batmobile out for a "wild joyride" and are intent on causing as much mayhem as possible and "lassoing" unsuspecting bystanders—only on this outing, their "victims" are more "randomly selected" than as customarily portrayed on Back from the Grave sleeves.

The inaugural track on the set is "Wild Man" by the Tamrons, from Concord North Carolina, which begins with a Twilight Zone-inspired arpeggiated riff and was recorded at Arthur Smith's Studio in Charlotte. "Dinah Wants Religion" is by the Fabs, from Fullerton, California, who are sometimes mistaken for being a Texas band. Tacoma, Washington garage rock legends, the Sonics, are represented on the set with the fuzz-drenched "Santa Claus." Tonto and the Renegades from Ocean Port, New Jersey perform "Little Boy Blue." Side two begins with "13 Stories High" by the Botumless Pit. L.A.'s the Sloths provide the blues-tinged protopunk of "Makin' Love." The Vectors, from Chicago perform "What In the World." The set concludes with "Night of the Sadist," by Larry and the Blue Notes.

== Track listing ==
=== Side one ===
1. The Tamrons: "Wild-Man"
2. The Cyclones: "She's No Good"
3. The Fabs: "Dinah Wants Religion"
4. Red Beard and the Pirates: "Go on Leave"
5. The Hallmarks: "I Know Why"
6. The Sonics: "Santa Claus"
7. Rocky & The Riddlers: "Flash and Crash"
8. Tonto and the Renegades: "Little Boy Blue"

=== Side two ===
1. The Botumless Pit: "13 Stories High"
2. The Aztex: "I Said Move"
3. The Nomads: "Be Nice"
4. Bunker Hill: "The Girl Can't Dance"
5. The Sloths: "Makin' Love"
6. The Wyld: 'Fly By Nighter"
7. The Vectors: "What in the World"
8. The Huns: "Shakedown"
9. Larry and the Blue Notes: "Night of the Sadist"

== Catalogue and release information ==
- Long playing record (Crypt LP-004, rel. 1984)

== Back from the Grave, Volumes 3 and 4 (CD) ==
Back from the Grave, Volumes 3 and 4 (CD)

Compilation album
- Released: 2015
- Recorded: 1960s
- Genres: Garage rock; protopunk
- Label: Crypt

chronology
Back from the Grave, Volumes 1 and 2 (CD) (2005)	Back from the Grave, Volumes 3 and 4 (CD) (2015)	Back from the Grave, Volumes 5 and 6 (CD) (2005)

Back from the Grave, Volumes 3 and 4 (CD) is a remastered CD that combines into one disc volumes 3 and 4 of the original 1983 and 1984 LPs in the Back from the Grave series of garage rock compilations out by Tim Warren of Crypt Records. This CD was released in 2015. It is not to be confused with the older Back from the Grave, Volume 3 and Back from the Grave, Volume 4 CDs released from 1996 to 2000, which differed dramatically from their LP counterparts in terms of track selection. This new CD is a part of a new Back from the Grave sub-series of CDs which attempts to more faithfully replicate the song selection original LPs, bringing the series for the first time into multi-media coherence. Like the LP's, the packaging features well-researched liner notes written by Tim Warren which convey basic information about each song and group, such as origin, recording date, and biographical sketches. The packaging also includes photographs of the bands, and the front cover (taken from the Volume 3 LP) features a highly satirical cartoon by Mort Todd. The track list to the Volumes 3 and 4 CD is similar to the corresponding LPs, but there are some differences.

== Track listing ==
1. Little Willie and the Adolescents: "Get Out of My Life"
2. The Chentelles: "Be My Queen"
3. Ken and the Fourth Dimension: "See if I Care"
4. The Fugitives: "You Can't Blame That on Me"
5. Me and Them Guys: "I Loved Her So"
6. The Intruders Five: "Ain't Comin' Back"
7. The Monacles: "I Can't Win"
8. Lil' Boys Blue: "I'm Not There"
9. Jerry and the Others: "Don't Cry to Me"
10. The Royal Flairs: "Suicide"
11. Murphy and the Mob: "Born Loser"
12. The Mods: "You've Got Another Thing Comin'"
13. The Interns: "I've Got Something to Say"
14. Sir Winston and the Commons: "We're Gonna Love"
15. The Montells: "You Can't Make Me"
16. The Tamrons: "Wild-Man"
17. The Cyclones: "She's No Good"
18. The Fabs: "Dinah Wants Religion"
19. Red Beard and The Pirates: "Go on Leave"
20. The Hallmarks: "I Know Why"
21. Rocky & The Riddlers: "Flash and Crash"
22. Tonto and the Renegades: "Little Boy Blue"
23. The Botumless Pit: "13 Stories High"
24. The Aztex: "I Said Move"
25. The Nomads: "Be Nice"
26. Bunker Hill: "The Girl Can't Dance"
27. The Sloths: "Makin' Love"
28. The Wyld: 'Fly by Nighter"
29. The Vectors: "What in the World"
30. The Huns: "Shakedown"

== Catalogue and release information ==
- Compact disc (Crypt CD, rel. 2015)
