= Back from the Grave Part 2 =

- U.S. release cover, titled Volume Two

Compilation album
- Released: October 1993 (Germany); August 23, 1996
- Genres: Garage rock; protopunk
- Length: 1:13:05
- Label: Crypt

chronology
Back from the Grave Part One (1993)	Back from the Grave Part 2 (1993)	Back from the Grave Part Three (1994)

Back from the Grave Part 2 (in the U.S. released as Volume Two) is the second installment in the Back from the Grave compact disc-exclusive series of garage rock compilations assembled by Tim Warren of Crypt Records. It was released on August 23, 1996. Its track listing differs from that of the LP version, which is part of the Back From the Grave LP-edition series, also on Crypt. In keeping with all of the entries in the series, and as indicated in the subheading which reads "Raw 'n' Crude Mid-60s Garage Punk!," this collection consists of many songs which display the rawer and more aggressive side of the genre and are often characterized by the use of fuzztone-distorted guitars and rough vocals. Accordingly, the set generally excludes psychedelic, folk rock, and pop-influenced material in favor of basic primitive rock and roll. The packaging features a booklet containing well-researched liner notes written by Tim Warren which conveys basic information about each song and group, such as origin, recording date, and biographical sketches, usually written in a conversational style that includes occasional slang, anecdotes, humorous asides.

== Track listing ==
1. Jerry & The Others: "Don't Cry to Me" 2:56
2. The Fugitives: "You Can't Blame That on Me" 2:42
3. Willie the Wild One: "Willie the Wild One" 2:11
4. Murphy & The Mob: "Born Loser" 2:28
5. The Mods: "You've Got Another Think Comin'" 2:31
6. Sir Winston and the Commons: "We're Gonna Love" 2:38
7. The Royal Flairs: "Suicide" 1:59
8. The Montells: "You Can't Make Me" 2:14
9. The Tamrons: "Wild-Man" 3:11
10. Cyclones: "She's No Good" 2:19
11. The Fabs: "Dinah Wants Religion" 2:41
12. Red Beard & the Pirates: "Go on Leave" 2:28
13. The Hallmarks: "I Know Why" 2:41
14. Rocky & The Riddlers: "Flash and Crash" 2:44
15. Tonto and the Renegades: "Little Boy Blue" 2:26
16. The Botumless Pit/The Suedes: "13 Stories High" 2:42
17. The Aztex: "I Said Move" 2:08
18. The Sloths: "Makin' Love" 2:03
19. The Wyld: "Fly by Nighter" 2:01
20. The Vectors: "What in the World" 2:19
21. The Huns: "Shakedown" 2:14
22. The Humans: "Warning" 2:27
23. The Warlords: "Real Fine Lady" 2:12
24. The Vestells "Won't You Tell Me" 2:41
25. The Illusions: "City of People" 2:29
26. The Jaguars: It's Gonna Be Alright 2:17
27. The Few: "Escape" (John Clifford White) 2:39
28. The Keggs: "To Find Out" 2:18
29. The Nomads: "Be Nice" 2:39
30. The Barracudas: "Baby Get Lost" 1:47

== Catalogue and release information ==
- Compact disc (CRYPT CD-0345, rel. 1996)
