= Back from the Grave, Volume 1 =

1983 compilation album

Back from the Grave

Compilation album
- Released: August 6, 1983
- Recorded: 1960s
- Genres: Garage rock; protopunk
- Label: Crypt

chronology
n. a.	Back from the Grave (1983)	Back from the Grave, Volume 2 (1983)

Back from the Grave is the first installment in the Back from the Grave series of garage rock compilations put together by Tim Warren of Crypt Records and released in 1983 on LP. In keeping with all of the entries in the series, and as indicated in the subheading which reads "Rockin' 1966 Punkers," this collection consists of songs which display the rawer and more aggressive side of the genre and are often characterized by the use of fuzztone-distorted guitars and rough vocals. The set generally excludes psychedelic, folk rock, and pop-influenced material in favor of basic primitive rock and roll. The packaging features well-researched liner notes written by Tim Warren which convey basic information about each song and group, such as origin, recording date, and biographical sketches, usually written in a conversational style that includes occasional slang, anecdotes, humorous asides. The liner notes are noticeably opinionated, sometimes engaging in tongue-in-cheek insults directed at other genres of music. The packaging also includes photographs of the bands, and the front cover features a highly satirical cartoon by Mort Todd depicting a revivified "rock and roll" zombie who, along with his macabre cohorts, has just emerged from the grave to "bury" all specimens of supposedly "heretical" pop and progressive music which have come to prominence over the years, such as disco music and MTV.

The set begins with "My Confusion" by The Elite from Fort Worth Texas. "Do You Understand Me," was their last release by Grand Rapids, Michigan's The JuJus. Two songs by the Alarm Clocks from Parma, Ohio are included, "Yeah" and "No reason to Complain"—both recorded at Sound Ideas Recording Studio in Cleveland. The Fabs from Fullerton, California, are sometimes mistaken for being from Texas, perhaps because the cut, "That's the Bag I'm In," though recorded in Hollywood, was released on the Dallas-based Cottonball label. The Malibus from Providence, Rhode Island can be heard on the fuzz-drenched "Cry" and the Legends from Holland, Michigan, play "I'll Come Again," which was recorded in 1965 but not released until 1967 on Fenton Records. Several of the odder cuts are the "We All Love Peanut Butter" and a take on "Jack the Ripper," both done by the One Way Streets and "Rat's Revenge Part One" and "Rat's Revenge Part Two" by the Rats. The Swamp Rats, from Pittsburgh do a rendition of the Sonics's "Psycho." The set closes with the unlikely inclusion of the song that, in the Words of Jeff Jarema, is "in the tradition of the Stooges and MC5...another 1970 punk classic," "Ghost Power," by the Cords, a group made up of real-life Franciscan friars, who in the spirit of Vatican II decided to play rock & roll as a way to attract some of the younger generation to consecrated life. The song also appears on the Garage Beat '66, Volume 4 CD compilation, released on Sundazed Music in 2005.

== Track listing ==
=== Side one ===
1. The Elite: "My Confusion" 2:12 (Charay C-31)
2. The JuJus: "Do You Understand Me" 2:29 (United Records [Grand Rapids, MI] no cat. #)
3. The Alarm Clocks: "Yeah" (M. Pierce) 2:45 (Awake 107)
4. The Alarm Clocks: "No Reason to Complain" (M. Pierce) 2:12 (Awake 107)
5. The Fabs: "That's the Bag I'm In" (Fred Niel) 2:23 (Cotton Ball 1005)
6. The Malibus: "Cry" 2:15 (Planet [Providence, RI] 58)
7. Bel-Aires: "Ya Ha Be Be" 2:37 (Discotheque 1004)
8. The Legends: "I'll Come Again" 2:07 (Fenton 2512)

=== Side two ===
1. The Rats: "Rat's Revenge, Pt. 1" 3:11
2. The Rats: Rat's Revenge, Pt. 2" 2:34
3. The One Way Streets: "We All Love Peanut Butter" 2:47
4. Larry and the Blue Notes: "Night of the Phantom" 2:11
5. The One Way Streets: "Jack Ripper: 2:20
6. The Swamp Rats: "Psycho" (Gerald Roslie) 2:55
7. The Cords: "Ghost Power" 3:02

== Catalogue and release information ==
- Long playing record (Crypt RR-66, rel. 1983)

== Back from the Grave, Volumes 1 and 2 (CD) ==
Back from the Grave, Volumes 1 and 2 (CD)

Compilation album
- Released: 2015
- Recorded: 1960s
- Genres: Garage rock; protopunk
- Label: Crypt

chronology
Back from the Grave, Volumes 1 and 2 (CD) (2015)	Back from the Grave, Volumes 3 and 4 (CD) (2005)

Back from the Grave, Volumes 1 and 2 (CD) is a newly re-mastered CD that combines into one disc volumes 1 and 2 of the original 1983 LPs in the Back from the Grave series of garage rock compilations out by Tim Warren of Crypt Records. This CD was released in 2015. It is not to be confused with the older Back from the Grave, Volume 1 and Back from the Grave, Volume 2 CDs released in 1996, which differed dramatically from their LP counterparts in terms of track selection. This new CD is a part of a new Back from the Grave sub-series of CDs which attempts to more faithfully replicate the song selection original LPs, bringing the series for the first time into multi-media coherence. Like the LPs, the packaging features well-researched liner notes written by Tim Warren which convey basic information about each song and group, such as origin, recording date, and biographical sketches. The track list to the Volumes 1 and 2 CD is similar to the corresponding LPs, but there are some differences.

== Track listing ==
1. The Elite: "My Confusion" 2:12
2. The JuJus: "Do You Understand Me" 2:29
3. The Alarm Clocks: "Yeah" (M. Pierce) 2:45
4. The Alarm Clocks: "No Reason to Complain" (M. Pierce) 2:12
5. The Fabs: "That's the Bag I'm In" (Fred Neil) 2:23
6. The Malibus: "Cry" 2:15
7. The Bel-Aires: "Ya Ha Be Be"
8. The Legends: "I'll Come Again" 2:07
9. The Rats: "Rat's Revenge, Pt. 1" 3:11
10. The Rats: Rat's Revenge, Pt. 2" 2:34
11. The One Way Streets: "We All Love Peanut Butter" 2:47
12. Larry & the Blue Notes: "Night of the Phantom" 2:11
13. The One Way Streets: "Jack Ripper" 2:20
14. The Swamp Rats: "Psycho" (Gerald Roslie) 2:55
15. The Cords: "Ghost Power" 3:02
16. The Outsiders: "Summertime Blues"
17. The Banshees: "They Prefer Blondes" 2:25
18. Unknown Artist: "Little By Little"
19. The Hatfields: "Yes I Do" 2:10
20. The Reasons Why: "All I Really Need is Love" 2:07
21. Ralph Nielsen & The Chancellors: "Scream"
22. The Mystics: "Snoopy" 2:24
23. The Lyrics: "They Can't Hurt Me" 2:43
24. The Hysterics: "Won't Get Far"
25. The Lyrics: "They Can't Hurt Me"
26. The Canadian Rogues: "Keep In Touch" 2:18
27. Sweet Cherry Funny: "Things Floating"
28. The Outsiders: "She's Coming on Stronger" 2:19
29. The Mods: "Satisfaction" 3:45
30. The Deverons: "On The Road Again"
31. The Children of Darkness: "She's Mine" 2:36

== Catalogue and release information ==
- Compact disc (Crypt CD, rel. 2015)
