= Back from the Grave, Volume 5 =

1985 compilation album

Compilation album
- Released: 1985
- Recorded: 1960s
- Genre: Garage rock; protopunk
- Label: Crypt

chronology
Back from the Grave, Volume 4 (1984)	Back from the Grave, Volume 5 (1985)	Back from the Grave, Volume 6 (1986)

2015 CD edition
- Volumes 5 and 6

Back from the Grave, Volume 5 is the fifth installment in the Back from the Grave series of garage rock compilations assembled by Tim Warren of Crypt Records. It was released in 1985. In keeping with all of the entries in the series, and as indicated in the subheading that reads "16 Crazed Bone Crunchin' Mid-60s Garage Punkers", this collection consists of songs which display the rawer and more aggressive side of the genre and are often characterized by the use of fuzztone-distorted guitars and rough vocals. The set generally excludes psychedelic, folk rock, and pop-influenced material in favor of basic primitive rock and roll. The packaging features well-researched liner notes written by Tim Warren which convey basic information about each song and group, such as origin, recording date, and biographical sketches, usually written in a conversational style that includes occasional slang, anecdotes, humorous asides. The liner notes are noticeably opinionated, sometimes engaging in tongue-in-cheek insults directed at other genres of music. The packaging also includes photographs of the bands, and the front cover features a highly satirical cartoon by Mort Todd which depicts revivified zombies, in customary fashion, returning to wreak havoc, this time exacting joyful revenge on whole chunks of the human race (i.e. followers of what they consider to be the musically "heretical" forms which have come in and out of fashion since the demise of 1960s garage bands), by using a variety of noxious substances and even resorting to the nuclear option, while a handful of their victims wallow in a "hydroconformic acid hot tub."

The set begins with "Warning" by the Humans from Albion, New York. "Won't You Tell Me" is by Vestells from eastern Pennsylvania and was recorded at the Cameo-Parkway Studios in Philadelphia. Also included is "City of People", an invective against conformist society, by the Illusions from Detroit. The Keggs from Detroit close out side one with what Tim Warren has called their "tortured" anthem, "To Find Out". Side two begins with the organ-driven protopunk of "Stormy" by the Jesters of Newport. The Tigermen from upstate New York perform "Close That Door". The set concludes with "Take the World As It Comes", by the Rising Tides.

== Track listing ==
=== Side one ===
1. The Humans: "Warning"
2. The Warlords: "Real Fine Lady"
3. The Vestells: "Won't You Tell Me"
4. The Illusions: "City of People"
5. The Jaguars: "It's Gonna Be Alright"
6. The Few: "Escape"
7. The Tikis: "Show You Love"
8. The Keggs: "To Find Out"

=== Side two ===
1. The Jesters Of Newport: "Stormy"
2. The Henchmen: "Livin'"
3. The Tigermen: "Close That Door"
4. The Aztex: "The Little Streets in My Town"
5. The Hatfields The Kid from Cinncy
6. The Nobles: "Something Else"
7. The Centrees: "She's Good for Me"
8. The Rising Tides: "Take the World As It Comes"

== Catalogue and release information ==
- Long-playing record (Crypt LP-005, rel. 1985)

== Back from the Grave, Volumes 5 and 6 (CD) ==
Back from the Grave, Volumes 5 and 6 (CD)

Compilation album
- Released: 2015
- Recorded: 1960s
- Genre: Garage rock; protopunk
- Label: Crypt

chronology
Back from the Grave, Volumes 3 and 4 (CD) (2015)	Back from the Grave, Volumes 5 and 6 (CD) (2015)	Back from the Grave, Volume 7 (2015)

Back from the Grave, Volumes 5 and 6 is a re-mastered CD that combines into one disc volumes 5 and 6 of the original 1983 LPs in the Back from the Grave series of garage rock compilations out by Tim Warren of Crypt Records. The CD was released in 2015. Until this CD in 2015, there had been no releases of volumes 5 and 6 on CD, as all of the songs that were included on the volumes 5 and LPs appeared instead on volumes 1-4 in the old CD series—the entries in that old CD series differed dramatically from the LPs. However, this CD is a part of a new Back from the Grave sub-series that attempts to more faithfully replicate the song selection original LPs, bringing the series into multi-media coherence. Like the LPs the packaging features well-researched liner notes by Tim Warren that convey basic information about each song and group, such as origin, recording date, and biographical sketches. The packaging also includes photographs of the bands, and the front cover (taken from the Volume 5 LP) features a highly satirical cartoon by Mort Todd. The track list to the Volumes 5 and 6 CD is similar to the corresponding LPs, but there are some differences.

Track listing

1. The Jesters of Newport: "Stormy"
2. The Warlords: "Real Fine Lady"
3. The Henchmen: "Livin'"
4. The Jaguars: "It's Gonna Be Alright"
5. The Vestells: "Won't You Tell Me"
6. The Few: "Escape"
7. The Nobles: "Something Else"
8. The Keggs: "To Find Out"
9. The Humans: "Warning"
10. The Illusions: "City of People"
11. The Tigermen: "Close That Door"
12. The Aztex: "The Little Streets in My Town"
13. The Hatfields The Kid from Cinncy
14. The Centrees: "She's Good for Me"
15. The Tikis: "Show You Love"
16. The Rising Tides: "Take the World as it Comes"
17. The Shames: "My World Is Upside Down"
18. Long John and the Silvermen: "Heart Filled with Love"
19. The Keggs: "Girl"
20. Beaux Jens: "She was Mine"
21. Shames: "Special Ones"
22. The Savoys: "Can It Be"
23. The Abandoned: "Come on Mary"
24. The Barracudas: "Baby Get Lost"
25. The Ascots: "So Good"
26. The Shames: "Special Ones"
27. The Golden Catalinas: "Varsity Club Song"
28. Billy and the Kids: "Say You Love Me"
29. The Shandels: "Caroline"
30. The Shandels: "Mary Mary"
31. The Treytones: "Nonymous"
32. The Bryds: "Your Lies"
33. The Trojans of Evol: "Through the Night"
