= Back from the Grave Part Four =

- U.S. release cover, titled Volume Four

Compilation album
- Released: September 1995 (Germany); October 10, 2000
- Recorded: 1960s
- Genres: Garage rock; protopunk
- Length: 1:15:10
- Label: Crypt

chronology
Back from the Grave Part Three (1994)	Back from the Grave Part Four (1995)	n. a.

Back from the Grave Part Four (in the U.S. released as Volume Four) is the fourth installment in the Back from the Grave compact disc-exclusive series of garage rock compilations assembled by Tim Warren of Crypt Records. It was released on October 10, 2000. Its track listing differs from that of the LP version, which is part of the Back From the Grave LP-edition series, also on Crypt. In keeping with all of the entries in the series, and as indicated in the subheading which reads "Raw 'n' Crude Mid-60s Garage Punk!," this collection consists of many songs which display the rawer and more aggressive side of the genre and are often characterized by the use of fuzztone-distorted guitars and rough vocals. Accordingly, the set generally excludes psychedelic, folk rock, and pop-influenced material in favor of basic primitive rock and roll. The packaging features a booklet containing well-researched liner notes written by Tim Warren which conveys basic information about each song and group, such as origin, recording date, and biographical sketches, usually written in a conversational style that includes occasional slang, anecdotes, humorous asides. The liner notes are noticeably opinionated, sometimes engaging in tongue-in-cheek insults directed at other genres of music. The booklet also includes photographs of the bands, and the front cover features a highly satirical cartoon by Mort Todd depicting revivified "rock and roll" zombies who, on this occasion, with the help of Batman's sidekick, Robin, have taken the 1966 TV series Batmobile out for a "wild joyride" and are intent on causing as much mayhem as possible and "lassoing" unsuspecting bystanders—only on this outing, their "victims" are more "randomly selected" than as customarily portrayed on Back from the Grave sleeves.

The set begins with the fuzz-drenched "That's for Sure" by Riverside, California's the Mustangs. The Heathens, from Schenectady, New York, perform "The Other Way Around," which contains the line "I'd rather be dying with you girl, than be already dead with her!" Half-Pint & the Fifths sing the blues-based "Orphan Boy" about the hard life of an orphan. Phoenix's The Spiders, who would later attain fame as Alice Cooper, perform two songs on the set, "Don't Blow Your Mind" and "No Price Tag." The Mystic Five, from Venetia, Pennsylvania, serve up the highly primitive protopunk of "Are You for Real, Girl?" Ty Wagner's "Slander" is the fifteenth track. "Do You like What You See" is by the Invasion from Milwaukee. Chicago's the travel Agency perform the raunchy "Jailbait." It's Us form Kenellon, New Jersey play "Don't Want Your Lovin'" and the Outsiders from Tampa Florida (not to be confused with the better-known Ohio band of the same name) sing "She's Comin' on Stronger." Akron, Ohio's the Interns play "I've Got Something to Say." The set closes with "True Love Knows" by Beep Beep & the Roadrunners.

== Track listing ==
1. The Mustangs: "That's for Sure" 2:07
2. The Tyme: "Land of 1,000 Dances" 3:23
3. Noblemen: "Short Time" 2:03
4. The Heathens: "The Other Way Around" 2:39
5. The Snails: "The Snails' Love Theme" 2:49
6. The Retreds: "Black Mona Lisa" 2:58
7. Half-Pint & the Fifths: "Orphan Boy" 2:26
8. The Spiders "Don't Blow Your Mind" 2:36
9. The Grifs: "Keep Dreamin'" 2:09
10. Spiders: "No Price Tag" 2:05
11. Mike's Messengers: "Gone and Left Me" 2:58
12. The Mystic Five: "Are You for Real, Girl?" 2:48
13. The Cavaliers: "7 Days of Cryin'" 2:03
14. The Hides: "Don't Be Difficult" 2:39
15. Ty Wagner: "Slander" 2:07
16. The Invasion: "Do You Like What You See?" 2:09
17. The Travel Agency: "Jailbait" 2:54
18. The Ron-De-Voos: "The Maid" 2:14
19. It's Us: "Don't Want Your Lovin'" 2:49
20. The Moguls: "Ski Bum" 2:21
21. Bel-Aires: "Ya Ha Be Be" 2:37
22. Reasons Why: "All I Really Need Is Love" 2:22
23. The Outsiders: "She's Comin' on Stronger" 2:20
24. Roy Junior: "Victim of Circumstances" 2:21
25. Children of Darkness: "She's Mine" 2:35
26. The Interns: "I've Got Something to Say" 3:27
27. Larry and the Blue Notes: "Night of the Sadist" 2:11
28. The Bryds: "Your Lies" 2:25
29. The Trojans of Evol: "Through the Night" 2:29
30. Beep Beep & the Roadrunners: "True Love Knows" 2:06

== Catalogue and release information ==
- Compact disc (Crypt CD: CR-0013, released on CD in 1995)
