= Back from the Grave, Volume 7 =

Compilation album
- Released: 1988
- Recorded: 1960s
- Genres: Garage rock; protopunk
- Label: Crypt

chronology
Back from the Grave, Volume 6 (1986)	Back from the Grave, Volume 7 (1988)	Back from the Grave, Volume 8 (1996)

Back from the Grave, Volume 7 is the seventh installment in the Back from the Grave series of garage rock compilations assembled by Tim Warren of Crypt Records and is available on LP and CD. It was originally released in 1988 as a double-LP containing 34 tracks, and has been newly re-mastered and re-issued in 2015. Though most of the LP's tracks had appeared on parts 3 and 4 of the Back from the Grave CD-specific sub-series (released in 1994 and 1995), in 2015, it was released on CD with the re-mastered material and closely matches the song content (and album cover artwork) of the original LP (containing all but two of the cuts on the original LP) as part of an effort to bring the LP's and CD's of the series into multi-medium coherence. In keeping with all of the entries in the series, and as indicated in the subheading which reads "Raw Blastin' Mid 60s Punk," this collection generally excludes psychedelic, folk rock, and pop-influenced material in favor of basic primitive rock and roll, usually consisting of songs displaying the rawer and more aggressive side of the genre often characterized by the use of fuzztone-distorted guitars and rough vocals.

The packaging features well-researched liner notes written by Tim Warren which convey basic information about each song and group, such as origin, recording date, and biographical sketches, usually written in a conversational style that includes occasional slang, anecdotes, humorous asides. The liner notes are noticeably opinionated, sometimes engaging in tongue-in-cheek insults directed at other genres of music. The packaging also includes photographs of the bands, and the front cover features a highly satirical cartoon by Mort Todd which once again depicts the customary revivified zombies whose ethos always demands strict adherence to what they consider to be the "one true faith" of "pure" rock & roll (i.e. with no admixture of what they consider to be "revisionist heresy"), and on this particular occasion they are accompanied by a very select remnant of survivors (supposed "true" rock & roll fans and beautiful women) who have been allowed to seek refuge on rafts and be spared from the vengeful "apocalypse" (and its torrential flood of Biblical proportions), which has been waged against all supposed forms of musio-cultural "heterodoxy" and its global adherents.

The set begins with "The Egyptian Thing" by the Syndicate, from Los Angeles (not to be confused with the Syndicate of Sound of San Jose), and they appear again on the rousing ninth track, "My Baby's Barefoot." "Another Day,' is by the Moguls, and its lyrics, instead of glorifying the rock & roll lifestyle, address the daily hassles and setbacks of being in a traveling band. The Worlocks from Elgin, Pennsylvania's are heard on the highly frantic sixth track, "I Love You." The Hush Puppies, continue in much the same vein with the spirited "Look for Another Love," then later re-appear with the edgier twelfth track, "Hey, Stop Messin' Around." The Cliques, from Champaign, Illinois, follow suit with "So Hard," a song whose lyrics express intense frustration with a lover. The blues-based "Orphan Boy," by Half-Pint & the Fifths, is one of the highlights of the album and tells a tale about the dejected (and rejected) life of an orphan. The Spiders would later attain fame as Alice Cooper and are represented with two songs on the set, "Don't Blow Your Mind," which was a big hit in their hometown of Phoenix, Arizona, and "No Price Tag." The Mystic Five, from Venetia, Pennsylvania, serve up the highly primitive protopunk of "Are You for Real, Girl?," and The Bends respond in kind with "If It's All The Same To You." The closing track is "Slander," by Ty Wagner.

== LP track listing ==
=== Side one ===
1. The Syndicate: "The Egyptian Thing"
2. The Tombstones: "I Want You"
3. Moguls: "Another Day"
4. The Puddin' Heads: "Now You Say We're Through"
5. Jim Whelan & the Beau Havens: "Elizabeth"
6. The Worlocks: "I Love You"
7. The Hush Puppies: "Look for Another Love"
8. The Bugs: "Slide"

=== Side two ===
1. The Gentrys: "Wild"
2. The Syndicate: "My Baby's Barefoot"
3. The Bends: "It's All the Same to You"
4. The Hush Puppies: "Hey, Stop Messin' Around"
5. The Cliques: "So Hard"
6. The Heathens: "The Other Way Around"
7. Beep Beep & the Roadrunners: "True Love Knows"
8. The Snails: "Snails' Love Theme"
9. Half-Pint & the Fifths: "Orphan Boy"

=== Side three ===
1. The Mustangs: "That's for Sure"
2. The Tyme: "Land of 1000 Dances"
3. The Noblemen: "Short Time"
4. The Invasion: "Do You Like What You See?"
5. The Travel Agency: "Jailbait"
6. The Ron-De-Voos: "The Maid"
7. It's Us: "Don't Want Your Lovin'"
8. The Moguls: "Ski Bum"

=== Side four ===
1. The Spiders: "Don't Blow Your Mind"
2. The Grifs: "Keep Dreamin'"
3. The Spiders: "No Price Tag"
4. The Retreds: "Black Mona Lisa"
5. Mike's Messengers: "Gone and Left Me"
6. The Mystic Five: "Are You for Real, Girl?"
7. The Cavaliers: "7 Days of Cryin'"
8. The Hides: "Don't Be Difficult"
9. Ty Wagner: "Slander"

== CD track listing ==
1. The Syndicate: "The Egyptian Thing"
2. The Tombstones: "I Want You"
3. The Moguls: "Another Day"
4. The Puddin' Heads: "Now You Say We're Through"
5. Jim Whelan: "Elizabeth"
6. The Worlocks: "I Love You"
7. The Hush Puppies: "Look for Another Love"
8. The Bugs: "Slide"
9. The Gentrys: "Wild"
10. The Syndicate: "My Baby's Barefoot"
11. The Hush Puppies: "Hey, Stop Messin' Around"
12. The Cliques: "So Hard"
13. The Heathens: "The Other Way Around"
14. Beep Beep & the Road Runners: "True Love Knows"
15. The Snails: "Snails Love Theme"
16. Messengers Gone: "And Left Me"
17. Little Joe and The Mustangs: "That's for Sure"
18. The Tyme: "Land Of 1000 Dancers"
19. The Noblemen: "Short Time"
20. Invasion: "Do You Like What You See?"
21. The Travel Agency: "Jailbait"
22. The Ron-De-Vous: "The Maid"
23. It's Us: "Don't Want Your Lovin'"
24. Half-Pint & The Fifths: "Orphan Boy"
25. The Spiders: "Don't Blow Your Mind"
26. The Grifs: "Keep Dreamin'"
27. The Retreads: "Black Mona Lisa"
28. The Mystic Five: "Are You for Real, Girl?"
29. The Bends: "If It's All The Same To You"
30. The Cavaliers: "Seven Days of Cryin'"
31. The Hides: "Don't Be Difficult"
32. Ty Wagner: "Slander"

== Catalogue and release information ==
- LP: (CR-013, rel. 1988)
- CD: (Crypt-013, rel. 2015)
