= Back from the Grave, Volume 6 =

Compilation album
- Released: 1986
- Recorded: 1960s
- Genres: Garage rock; protopunk
- Label: Crypt

chronology
Back from the Grave, Volume 5 (1984)	Back from the Grave, Volume 6 (1986)	Back from the Grave, Volume 7 (1988)

2015 CD edition
- Back from the Grave Volumes 5 & 6

Back from the Grave, Volume 6 is the sixth installment in the Back from the Grave series of garage rock compilations assembled by Tim Warren of Crypt Records. It was released in 1986. In keeping with all of the entries in the series, and as indicated in the subheading which reads "17 Loud Unpsychedelic Wild Mid-60s Garage Punkers," this collection generally excludes psychedelic, folk rock, and pop-influenced material in favor of basic primitive rock and roll, usually consisting of songs displaying the rawer and more aggressive side of the genre often characterized by the use of fuzztone-distorted guitars and rough vocals. The packaging features well-researched liner notes written by Tim Warren which convey basic information about each song and group, such as origin, recording date, and biographical sketches, usually written in a conversational style that includes occasional slang, anecdotes, humorous asides. The liner notes are noticeably opinionated, sometimes engaging in tongue-in-cheek insults directed at other genres of music. The packaging also includes photographs of the bands, and the front cover features a highly satirical cartoon by Mort Todd which depicts the customarily vengeful deeds of revivified zombies, but this time, in a version of the future based on a retro-vision from the past, replete with flying saucers, these defiantly "earthly" creatures have taken Crypt records' makeshift fighter-plane for a joyride into orbit for the purpose of not-so-safely depositing their "musically heterodox" victims into the outer reaches of space.

The set begins with "My World Is Upside Down" by the Shames from Ipswich, Massachusetts, who are also later represented on the set with "Special Ones." Two Michigan bands, Keggs from Detroit, who perform "Girl" and the Ascots from Pontiac ("So Good"), are also included on side one. Side two begins with "Varsity Club Song" by the Golden Catalinas from La Crosse, Wisconsin followed by "Say You Love Me," by Billy & the Kids from Wenatchee, Washington. "Come on Mary" is by the Abandoned "Love's a Fire" by the Werps. The set concludes with "Through the Night" by The Trojans Of Evol.

== Track listing ==
=== Side one ===
1. The Shames: "My World Is Upside Down"
2. Long John and the Silvermen: "Heart Filled with Love"
3. The Keggs: "Girl"
4. Beaux Jens: "She was Mine"
5. Shames: "Special Ones"
6. The Savoys: "Can It Be"
7. The Ascots: "So Good"
8. The Barracudas: "Baby Get Lost"

=== Side two ===
1. The Golden Catalinas: "Varsity Club Song"
2. Billy and the Kids: "Say You Love Me"
3. The Shandels: "Caroline"
4. The Shandels: "Mary Mary"
5. The Abandoned: "Come on Mary"
6. The Treytones: "Nonymous"
7. The Bryds: "Your Lies"
8. The Werps: "Love's a Fire"
9. The Trojans of Evol: "Through the Night"

== Catalogue and release information ==
- Long playing record (Crypt LP-006, rel. 1986)
- CD: as part of the Back from the Grave, Volumes 5 & 6 CD, 2015
