= Brigand (disambiguation) =

A brigand is a person who practices brigandage

The term brigand or brigands may also refer to:

- outlaw
- Brigands (film), a 1996 French drama film
- The Brigand (1952 film), an American adventure romance film
- The Brigand (1961 film), an Italian historical drama film
- Brigands: The Quest for Gold, an Italian television series
- The Brigand – A Romance of the Reign of Don Carlos, by Alexandre Dumas
- Bristol Brigand, airplane
- Bristol Brigand, British car manufactured from 1982 to 1994, version of the Bristol Type 603
- The Brigands (band)
- The Brigands, English title of Les brigands, operetta by Jacques Offenbach
- Brigands (DC Comics), a species of space pirates that appear in the comic Supergirl: Woman of Tomorrow and its film adaptation, Supergirl (2026 film)

== See also ==
- Brigant, surname
