= Teenage Shutdown! I'm a No-Count =

Compilation album
- Released: October 6, 1998
- Recorded: 1960s
- Genre: Garage rock
- Label: Crypt

chronology
Teenage Shutdown! Things Been Bad (1998)	Teenage Shutdown! I'm a No-Count (1998)	Teenage Shutdown! Nobody to Love (1998)

Teenage Shutdown! I'm a No-Count, sometimes referred to as "Volume 4,'" is the fourth installment in the Teenage Shutdown! series of garage rock compilations put out by Tim Warren of Crypt Records, which is available on both LP and compact disc formats. This volume was released on October 6, 1998 and is primarily composed of harder rocking fast-tempo material as indicated in the sub-heading which reads, "19 Teen Punk Stomp classics!" The collection takes its name from the twelfth track, "Im a No-Count," by Ty Wagner & the Scotchmen, from the Los Angeles area. Like all of the entries in the series, the collection was compiled and mastered by Warren, using original 45 rpm records selected from the collection of noted garage rock archivist, Mike Markesich (colloquially known as "Mop Top Mike"). The photograph which appears on the front cover is of ? & the Mysterians, but none of their songs are included on this compilation. The packaging includes liner notes providing information about the songs and bands.

The set begins with "Bad Woman" by the Fallen Angels from Syracuse, New York. It features protopunk anthems, such as "1523 Blair," by the Outcasts from San Antonio, Texas and "We're Pretty Quick," by the Chob, from Albuquerque, New Mexico. "I'm a Nothing" is by the Magic Plants, a couple of whose members would go on to join the Left Banke. Other songs included on the compilation are "Stop it Baby," by the Heard, from Rochester, New York, "I'm Gonna Get in That Girl's Mind," by the Reddlemen, from Angleton, Texas, and "I'm Gone," by the Gents, from Bermuda.

== Track listing ==
1. The Fallen Angels (Syracuse, New York) - "Bad Woman"
2. The Jolly Green Giants (Oregon) - "Caught You Red Handed"
3. Dale Gregory & the Shouters (Sioux Falls, South Dakota) - "Did Ya Need to Know"
4. The Plague (Albuquerque, New Mexico) - "Go Away"
5. The Heard (Rochester, New York) - "Stop It Baby"
6. The Continentals (Fort Worth, Texas) - "I'm Gone"
7. The Gents (Bermuda) - "If You Don't Come Back"
8. Byron & the Mortals (Lake Elsinore, California) - Do You Believe Me
9. The Outcasts (San Antonio, Texas) - "1523 Blair"
10. The Chob (Albuquerque, New Mexico) - "We're Pretty Quick"
11. Al's Untouchables (Iowa City, Iowa) - "Come On Baby"
12. Ty Wagner with the Scotchmen (Los Angeles, California) - "I'm a No-Count"
13. The Magic Plants (New York, New York) - "I'm a Nothing"
14. M.G. & the Escorts (Montreal, Quebec - Canada) - "A Someday Fool"
15. The Cave Men (Key West, Florida) - "It's Trash"
16. The Passions (Sherman, TX) - "Lively One"
17. The Opposite Six (Sacramento, California) - "I'll Be Gone"
18. The Reddlemen (Angleton, Texas) - "I'm Gonna Get in That Girl's Mind"
19. The Barking Spyders (Dallas, Texas) - "I Want Your Love"

== Catalogue and release information ==
- Record (LP-TS-6604, 1998)
- Compact Disc (CD-TS-6604, 1998)
