= Teenage Shutdown! You Treated Me Bad! =

Compilation album
- Released: October 6, 1998
- Recorded: 1960s
- Genre: Garage rock
- Label: Crypt

chronology
Teenage Shutdown! Jump, Jive & Harmonize (1998)	Teenage Shutdown! You Treated Me Bad! (1998)	Teenage Shutdown! Things Been Bad (1998)

Teenage Shutdown! You Treated Me Bad! (subtitled The Teener Side of the Mid-'60s Garage Explosion) is a compilation album featuring material by underground garage rock musical artists that recorded in the mid-1960s, and was previously available to only a handful of collectors. It is the second installment of the Teenage Shutdown! series and was released on Crypt Records on October 6, 1998 (see 1998 in music).

The album compiles teen garage groups influenced by surf rock, and is somewhat raw and amateurish in its recordings. In comparison to the rest of the series, You Treated Me Bad is the most pop and folk rock-oriented as the majority of the featured musical artists attempted to appeal to public taste. Musical highlights include "Hurray for Hazel", by Terry Davidson and the Barracudas, which is an instrumental marked by its jangling freeform. Additionally, the Morticians' "It's Gonna Take a While" makes innovative use of fuzz-toned guitar arrangements, and the Sound Extraction's "I Feel Like Crying" holds the novelty of the singer vocalizing the guitar solo. Arguably, the best known song on the album is The JuJus' "You Treat Me Bad", which is considered a garage rock classic for its inclusion on Pebbles, Volume 1.

The album was reissued on LP in 2012.

== Track listing ==
1. The Gremlins: "Wait" - 2:06
2. The Moxies: "Get a Move On" - 2:00
3. J.D. Rogues: "Why Did God Make Girls" - 2:08
4. Monday's Mondos: "I'm Cryin'" - 2:37
5. Terry Davidson and the Barracudas: "Hurray for Hazel" - 2:12
6. Little John and the Sherwoods: "Long Hair" - 2:16
7. The Quests: "Scream Loud" - 2:28
8. The Plagues: "I've Been Through It Before" - 2:37
9. The Twiliters: "The Girl from Liverpool" - 2:06
10. The Midknights: "Pain" - 1:32
11. The Possums: "She's Loving Me" - 3:05
12. The Morticians: "It's Gonna Take a While" - 2:34
13. The Sound Extraction: "I Feel Like Crying" - 2:46
14. The Messengers: "I've Seen You Around" - 2:02
15. The Sānts: "Leaving You, Baby (On the Midnight Train)" - 2:16
16. The Dead Beats: "She Don't Love Me" - 2:07
17. The Mystery Men: "I've Got a Feeling" - 2:15
18. The Shoremen: "She's Bad" - 2:25
19. The JuJus: "You Treat Me Bad" - 1:51
