= Back from the Grave Part Three =

- U.S release cover, titled Volume Three

Compilation album
- Released: Feb 1994 (Germany); August 23, 1996 (US)
- Recorded: 1960s
- Genres: Garage rock; protopunk
- Length: 1:11:12
- Label: Crypt

chronology
Back from the Grave Part 2 (1993)	Back from the Grave Part Three (1994)	Back from the Grave Part Four (1995)

Back from the Grave Part Three (in the U.S. released as Volume Three) is the third installment in the Back from the Grave compact disc-edition series of garage rock compilations assembled by Tim Warren of Crypt Records. It was released on August 23 1996. Its track listing differs from that of the LP version, which is part of the Back From the Grave LP-edition series, also on Crypt. In keeping with all of the entries in the series, and as indicated in the subheading which reads "Raw 'n' Crude Mid-60s Garage Punk!," this collection consists of many songs which display the rawer and more aggressive side of the genre and are often characterized by the use of fuzztone-distorted guitars and rough vocals. Accordingly, the set generally excludes psychedelic, folk rock, and pop-influenced material in favor of basic primitive rock and roll. The packaging features a booklet containing well-researched liner notes written by Tim Warren which conveys basic information about each song and group, such as origin, recording date, and biographical sketches, usually written in a conversational style that includes occasional slang, anecdotes, humorous asides. The liner notes are noticeably opinionated, sometimes engaging in tongue-in-cheek insults directed at other genres of music. The booklet also includes photographs of the bands, and the front cover features a highly satirical cartoon by Mort Todd depicting revivified "rock and roll" zombies who have just emerged from the grave to "drop in a pit" all adherents of supposedly "heretical" pop and progressive music which have come to prominence over the years.

The set begins with the organ-driven protopunk of "Stormy," by the Jesters of Newport. "The Little Streets in My Town" is by The Aztex, from Northern Indiana. The Hatfields play "The Kid from Cincy," whose lyrics are about a young rock star. One of the featured cuts is "My World Is Upside Down" by The Shames from Ipswich, Massachusetts, which Tim Warren singles out for commendation in his liner notes. They also perform another track here, "The Special Ones." The Keggs, from Detroit, who had been featured on "Volume 2" of the series, appear again here with "Girl." The Savoys perform the wild, fuzz-drenched "Can It Be." In much the same frenzied vein, Billy & The Kids from Wenatchee, Washington, sing "Say You Love Me." "Another Day,' by the Moguls is about hassles and daily bump-and-grind of being in a band on the road. Elgin, Pennsylvania's the Worlocks perform the frantic "I Love You." The Hush Puppies have two cuts included on the set, "Look for Another Love" and "Hey, Stop Messin' Around." The Cliques close the set with "So Hard."

== Track listing ==
1. The Jesters of Newport: "Stormy" 3:25
2. The Hentchmen "Livin'" 2:11
3. Tigermen: "Close that Door" (John Farrell) (2:33)
4. The Aztex "The Little Streets in My Town" 2:11
5. Hatfields: "The Kid from Cinncy" 2:25
6. The Nobles: "Something Else" 2:20
7. The Shames: "My World Is Upside Down" 2:41
8. Long John & the Silvermen: "Heart Filled with Love' 2:19
9. The Keggs: "Girl" 2:11
10. Beaux Jens: "She Was Mine" 3:12
11. The Shames: "The Special Ones" 2:27
12. The Savoys: "Can It Be" 3:08
13. The Golden Catalinas: "Varsity Club Song" 2:22
14. Billy & The Kids: "Say You Love Me" 2:13
15. The Shandels: "Caroline" 2:09
16. The Shandels: "Mary, Mary" 2:35
17. The Abandoned "Come on Mary" 2:02
18. The Treytones: "Nonymous" 2:24
19. Syndicate: "The Egyptian Thing" 2:13
20. Tombstones: "I Want You" 2:57
21. The Moguls: "Another Day" 2:22
22. The Puddin' Heads: "Now You Say We're Through" 2:01
23. The Worlocks: "I Love You' 2:46
24. The Hush Puppies: "Look for Another Love" 2:35
25. The Bugs: "Slide" 2:11
26. Syndicate: "My Baby's Barefoot" 2:44
27. The Bends: "If It's All the Same to You" 2:37
28. The Hush Pupies: "Hey, Stop Messin' Around" 1:59
29. The Cliques: "So Hard" 1:59

== Catalogue and release information ==
- Compact disc (CRYPT CD: CR-5713, rel. 1994)
