= The Humans (New York band) =

American garage rock band

- The Humans pictured in 1966, from left to right (standing): Marty Busch, Dick Doolan, Bill Kuhns, Danny Long, Gar Trusselle; seated: Jack Dumrese

Background information
- Origin: Albion, New York, United States
- Genres: Garage rock; folk rock
- Years active: 1964–1966
- Label: Audition
- Past members: Dick Doolan; Danny Long; Bill Kuhns; Gar Trusselle; Marty Busch; Jack Dumrese

The Humans were an American garage rock band from Albion, New York who were active in the 1960s. They were popular in the region, touring throughout the Northeast, and enjoyed a regional hit, with the single "Take a Taxi" b/w "Warning", that received airplay in other markets around the country. "Warning" has become especially valued amongst garage rock enthusiasts and was included on the Back from the Grave compilation series.

== History ==
The Humans formed in the summer of 1964 in Albion, New York, twenty miles north of Batavia and not far from Rochester. All six of their members had been in the high school marching band when they decided to start a rock band. Their membership consisted of Dick Doolan on vocals, Danny Long on vocals and harmonica, Bill Kuhns on lead guitar, Gar Trusselle on keyboards, Marty Busch on bass, and Jack Dumrese on drums. They picked the name "Humans" as a humorous comment on the trend of bands being named after insects and animals in the fashion of British Invasion groups such as the Beatles and the Animals. The group's manager was Al Cecere out Rochester, who had them signed with Premier Talent Associates (PTA) in New York City. The group's agent with Premier was Rich Nader who later went on to promote rock festivals across the country. The Humans gained regional popularity, touring throughout the northeast and opening for several big-name acts, such as the Hollies and opened on several occasions for Mitch Ryder and the Detroit Wheels. They played a two-week engagement in Miami with the Standells and in 1966 performed at the Rheingold Festival in Central Park in Manhattan. The group became close friends with another New York band, the Heard (not to be confused with other groups of the same name), who were also managed by Al Cecere. They alternated with Caesar and His Romans from Buffalo at Oak Orchard Lanes, a popular bowling alley and nightspot in Albion. Well-known acts such as The Rivieras and the Shadows of Knight played at Oak Orchard Lanes.

Their manager Cecere owned a label, Audition Records. In 1966 they went to Riposo Studios in Syracuse to record a single for Audition, "Take a Taxi" b/w "Warning", which was released in June 1966. Though "Warning" was on the B-side, it would later become their best-known song amongst garage rock enthusiasts. The A-side "Take a Taxi" was a folk rock-influenced number. Lead guitarist Bill Kuhns (listed as William R. Kuhns Jr. on the label) composed both songs. Both songs became regional hits, enjoying airplay in the Northeast, and well as in other markets around the country. According to keyboardist Gar Trusselle, Billboard reported that the Humans' record reached the top twenty in Michigan and Texas. Both "Take a Taxi" and "Warning" became staples of their live sets. The group, whose hair was considered long for 1966, ran into frequent harassment. They band rented an abandoned movie theater in Albion and created their own venue there, naming it "Happiness Is..." In September 1966 vocalist and harmonica player Danny Long died in an automobile accident, which was the first in a series of events that eventually led to the group's demise. The draft board began to target several members of the group for conscription into the Vietnam War. The Humans played their last show at Happiness Is... in November 1966 and by the year's end had disbanded.

The Humans' work has come to the attention of garage rock enthusiasts with the release of "Warning" on the 1985 compilation Back from the Grave, Volume 5 (Crypt Records). According to the list of the 1000 greatest garage rock records of all time voted on by a panel of garage rock writers and experts in Mike Markesich's Teebeat Mayhem, "Warning" is ranked at #128 (out of the more than 16,000 records included in the book).

== Membership ==
- Dick Doolan (vocals)
- Danny Long (vocals and harmonica)
- Bill Kuhns (lead guitar)
- Gar Trusselle (keyboards)
- Marty Busch (bass)
- Jack Dumrese (drums)

== Discography ==
- "Warning" b/w "Take a Taxi'" (Audition 6109, June 1966)

== Bibliography ==
- Markesich, Mike (2012). Teenbeat Mayhem (1st ed.). Branford, Connecticut: Priceless Info Press. p. 129. ISBN 978-0-985-64825-1.
