= Tamron (disambiguation) =

Tamron Co., Ltd. is a Japanese company manufacturing photographic lenses, optical components and commercial/industrial-use optics.

Tamron is also a given name. It may refer to:

- Tamron Hall (born 1970), American broadcast journalist and television talk show host
- The Tamrons, American garage rock band in the 1960s
