= Teenage Shutdown! Things Been Bad =

Compilation album
- Released: October 6, 1998
- Recorded: 1960s
- Genre: Garage rock
- Label: Crypt

chronology
Teenage Shutdown! You Treated Me Bad! (1998)	Teenage Shutdown! Things Been Bad (1998)	Teenage Shutdown! I'm a No-Count (1998)

Teenage Shutdown! Teenage Shutdown! Things Been Bad, sometimes referred to as "Volume 3," is the third installment in the Teenage Shutdown! series of garage rock compilations put out by Tim Warren of Crypt Records, which is available on both LP and compact disc formats. This volume was released on October, 6 1998 and consists of primarily harder rocking up-tempo material as indicated by the sub-heading, which reads "18 Prime Slabs of Mid-'60s Garage Punk Grunt." Like all of the entries in the series, the collection was compiled and mastered by Warren, using original 45 rpm records selected from the collection of noted garage rock archivist, Mike Markesich (colloquially known as "Mop Top Mike"). Ironically, the photograph which appears on the front cover is of the Pink Finks, an Australian band not included on any of the album's tracks, all of which are performed by American groups.

The set begins with the frantic rocker, "Baba Yaga," by the Pagans from Rochester, Minnesota, whose lyrics are about the dreaded witch from Russian folklore. Ognir & The Nite People from Hazelton, Pennsylvania, fashioned their name after Beatles' drummer Ringo's name spelled backwards and perform "I Found a New Love." The Barracudas' "What I Want You to Say," was cut at the same studios located in a Downey, California record store where the Chantays had made "Pipeline." The album also includes Thee Midniters' novely song, "I Found a Peanut." The album also features songs such as "1,000 Miles (Cheating on Me)," by the Inner Thoughts, from Clearwater, Florida and "She Was Good," by the Talismen from Wenatchee, Washington. Kama Del Sutra, from Duluth, Minnesota, perform the closing track, "She Taught Me Love," which, because of its suggestive lyrics, was banned from receiving airplay in its region.

== Track listing ==
1. The Pagans (Rochester, Minnesota) - "Baba Yaga" 2:15
2. The Choab (Albuquerque, New Mexico) - "Why Am I Alone?" 1:58
3. The Barracudas (California) - "What I Want You to Say" 2:21
4. Ognir and the Nite People (Hazelton, Pennsylvania)- "I Found a New Love" 2:12
5. The Other Half (Chicago, Illinois)- "The Girl with the Long Black Hair" 2:47
6. The Yo Yo's (Memphis, Temmessee) - "Gotta Find a New Love" 2:44
7. Thee Midniters (Los Angeles, California) - "I Found a Peanut" 2:41
8. The Pilgrimage (Long Island, New York) - "Bad Apple" 2:25
9. The Debonaires (Chicago, Illinois)- "Never Mistaken 2:29
10. The Roamin' Togas (Lafayette, Louisiana) - "Bar the Door" 2:20
11. Peter and the Wolves (Palatine, Illinois) - "I Can Only Give You Everything" 2:38
12. The Roots (Greenville, South Carolina) - "Lost One" 2:09
13. The Inner Thoughts (Clearwater, Florida) - "1,000 Miles (Cheating on Me)" 2:53
14. The Talismen (Wenatchee, Washington) - "She was Good" 2:07
15. The Saxons (West Palm Beach, Florida) - "Things Have Been Bad" 2:40
16. The Stains (New Haven, Connecticut) - "Now and Then" 2:00
17. The Lost Soles (New Haven, Connecticut) - "Do You Remember" 2:19
18. Kama-del-Sutra (Duluth, Minnesota) - "She Taught Me Love" 2:12

== Catalogue and release information ==
- Record (LP-TS-6603, 1998)
- Compact disc (CD-TS-6603, 1998)
