= Fireworks (indie rock band) =

American garage rock band

Fireworks was an American garage rock band from Denton, Texas.

Fireworks was founded by Darin Lin Wood, a former member of the bands Cop Shoot Cop, '68 Comeback, and The Blacksnakes. In 1993, he founded Fireworks with Chris Merlick. Merlick was an itinerant member, leaving the group and returning several times; its other members included drummer Janet Walker and guitarist James Arthur. They released an album on Crypt Records in 1994 and a sophomore effort on Au Go Go Records in 1996. Following this, Wood and Walker worked on a side band with Mick Collins of The Gories called Blacktop; this project released I Got a Bad Feelin' About This in 1995 on In The Red. Fireworks's last full-length appeared in 1997.

== Members ==
- Darin Lin Wood – vocals, guitar, drums
- Chris Merlick – vocals, guitar, drums
- Janet Walker – drums
- James Arthur – guitar
- Keith Underwood – guitar

== Discography ==
- Set the World on Fire (Crypt Records, 1994)
- Off the Air (Au Go Go Records, 1996)
- Lit Up (Last Beat Records, 1997)
