= The Tamrons =

American garage rock band from North Carolina

- Origin: Concord, North Carolina, United States
- Genres: Garage rock; soul
- Years active: 1965-1968
- Label: Pyramid
- Past members: Lloyd Pettus; Robert Walters; Keith Stacy; Phil Walters; Ted Pettus; Steve Baucom; Bobby Yost; Eddie Coble; John Sherril; Rick Nash

The Tamrons were an American garage rock band from Concord, North Carolina, near Charlotte who were active in the 1960s. They became one of the most popular bands in Concord and the Charlotte area during the mid-1960s and enjoyed a regional hit with their single, "Wild-Man" backed with "Stop, Look, Listen" recorded at Arthur Smith's studio in Charlotte and released on his Pyramid label. They broke up in 1968. In the intervening years their work has become highly regarded by garage rock enthusiasts and has appeared on several compilations.

== History ==
=== Origins ===
The Tamrons were formed by several students who attended Concord High School in Concord, North Carolina in 1965. They were originally known as the Night Raiders. Initially their lineup consisted of Lloyd Pettus on lead guitar, Robert Walters on rhythm guitar, and Ted Pettus on drums. Keith Stacy, previously a guitarist in another local band, the Kings, joined on bass. According to Stacey, "They played against The Kings at a talent show and asked me if I could play bass, so I bought a bass guitar and joined The Night Raiders". Robert Walters’ brother, Phil Walters, joined on keyboards and played a Farfisa organ. Shortly thereafter, the Nightriders changed their name to the Tamrons at the suggestion of guitarist Lloyd Pettus. The Tamrons were influenced by the Beatles and the groups of the British Invasion, as well as American bands such as Paul Revere & the Raiders and the Byrds, whose song "It Won't be Wrong" was a regular fixture in the Tamrons' repertoire. Concord had an active garage band scene, with groups such as the Huns, the Fantastik Four, the Phantom Raiders, the West Wind, the Swinging Sensations, the Surfmates, the West Wind, and the Ravens, whose membership included Keith Stacey's brother Don Stacey.

The Tamrons also played regularly in Charlotte, which was the home of the Paragons and the Grifs. The Tamrons participated in several battle of the bands contests, such as at the Concord Recreation Center in 1967, and eventually toured in a wide area covering over a 200-mile radius. Initially, Robert Walters' father, Earl Walters, was the band's manager, but eventually Lloyd Pettus' father took over. According to Stacey:

He [Mr. Pettus] a bought us a trailer and had it painted; it was pretty cool for those days. I remember Mr. Walters taking us to Wilmington to play the telethon. We stopped off at a church and played, and while we were playing Mr. Walters talked the local police into coming in and shutting us down because we were too loud. We were stunned...He came out laughing at us, and the cops said crank it up. He was a funny guy.

Initially the Tamrons played at several gas station openings in downtown Concord, sometimes on the back of a flatbed trailer, and some of the performances were broadcast on live radio. They regularly played at the Green Dragon, a popular teen club in Concord.

=== Rivalry with the Huns and recording ===
The Tamrons and the Huns became the two most popular bands in Concord. Both were at first on friendly terms, but would later become bitter rivals. Several members of the Huns attended a Tamrons rehearsal at Lloyd Pettus' house and heard them perform their self-penned song "Genie". The Huns quickly went to the studio and recorded an almost identical song called "Shakedown" (later issued on the 1984 Back from the Grave, Volume 4 compilation. When the Tamrons heard the record, they became furious. According to Stacey:

We were furious! We went as a mob to Dean Coley’s house (their bass player). His father was their manager, so we stood out in the street and tried to get them to come out and fight. I can't tell you how mad that made us.

The Tamrons went to Arthur Smith's studio in Charlotte (where James Brown recorded "Papa's Got a Brand New Bag") to record their single for Smith's label, Pyramid Records, showcasing two songs written Pettus and Walters. The A-side featured the highly primitive and sexually charged "Wild-Man", which began with a Twilight Zone style guitar riff. The B-side was "Stop, Look, Listen", more melodic mid-tempo ballad. Though his contributions were barely audible in the mixes, keyboardist Steve Baucom was brought in to play organ and sang backup for both songs during the session. The single became a local and regional hit in the Concord/Charlotte area. The group continued playing and performing for the next couple of years, but went through lineup and stylistic changes. Robert Walters departed to concentrate on playing football and was replaced on guitar by Bobby Yost from Kannappolis, North Carolina. In 1968 the group decided to move in a soul and R&B direction and added a horn section consisting of Eddie Coble on saxophone, as well as John Sherril and Rick Nash on trumpets. Later that year the Tamrons broke up.

=== Later developments and legacy ===
Under the influence of Jimi Hendrix, Keith Stacy got together with Butch Yarborough, previously of the Fantastik Four, and formed a heavy rock group called Liquid Nitrogen. Stacy later played in groups such as Flight, Axis, and more recently Jesse Bolt. Robert Walters went on to play professional football with the Washington Redskins.

In the intervening years, the Tamrons' music has come to the attention of garage rock enthusiasts. In the list of the top 1000 garage rock recordings voted on by a panel of garage rock writers and experts appearing in Mike Markesich's Teenbeat Mayhem (the book includes over 16, 000 records), the Tamrons' song, "Wild-Man", was ranked at #147, placing it in the top 200 garage rock songs of all time. Their work has appeared in several Compilations. "Wild-Man" is included on the 1984 Back from the Grave, Volume 4 LP issued by Crypt Records. "Stop, Look, Listen" appears on the Total Ranch: 100% Boss Garage compilation put out by Manic Mustang Records. Summing up his experience with the Tamrons, Keith Stacey recalls:

Those days were magical. Everybody played in a band. Those guys are now lawyers and airline pilots, but then you had to be in a band in Concord.

== Membership ==
=== 1965-1967 ===
- Lloyd Pettus (lead guitar)
- Robert Walters (rhythm guitar)
- Keith Stacy (bass)
- Phil Walters (organ)
- Ted Pettus (drums)

=== 1968 ===
- Lloyd Pettus (guitar)
- Bobby Yost (lead guitar)
- Keith Stacy (bass)
- Phil Walters (organ)
- Ted Pettus (drums)
- Eddie Coble (saxophone)
- John Sherril (trumpet)
- Rick Nash (trumpet)

== Discography ==
- "Wild-Man" backed with "Stop, Look, Listen" (Pyramid 7-7381, January 1967)

== Bibliography ==
- Berger, Jacob; Coston, Daniel (2014). There Was a Time: Rock & Roll in the 1960s in Charlotte and North Carolina (1st ed.). Charlotte: Fort Canoga Press. ISBN 9780615809403.
- Markesich, Mike (2012). Teenbeat Mayhem (1st ed.). Branford, Connecticut: Priceless Info Press. ISBN 978-0-985-64825-1.
