= Brigant =

Brigant is a surname. Notable persons with this name include:

- Tomáš Brigant (born 1994), Slovak football player
- Niall Brigant, fictional character from The Southern Vampire Mysteries by author Charlaine Harris

== See also ==
- Brigantes, Celtic tribe
- Brigand (disambiguation)
