= The Grave Diggers =

American rockabilly, surf, jazz, punk band

The Grave Diggers were an American rockabilly, surf, jazz, punk band. They are notable due to their eclectic musical style, their early foreshadowing of subsequent music revival movements, and the musical careers of their members.

The band was established in Southern California in early 1983 by friends and classmates Jason Goodman (vocals/guitar), Wally Hersom (upright bass), Michael "Mick" McCarthy (guitar) and Quinn Millard (drums).

In 1985, they released the self-recorded four-song EP "Monsters At Play" on Bobbette Records. The band played shows around Southern California, opening for and playing with various rockabilly, surf, roots and garage artists including Tav Falco, The Untold Fables, Saddle Sores, Rockin' Rebels, James Intveld, The Red Devils, The Blazers, Eddie Nichols, Russell Scott, The Beguiled, Melvis & the Megatones and Bobbi Brat.

In 1989, they released the full-length LP "Move It" on Crypt Records. "Move It" was recorded at Coyote Studios in Brooklyn, New York, during a one-day session that yielded twenty-five songs, ten of which were never released. The album was produced by British musician Billy Childish and featured album artwork by Cliff Mott. During that trip to New York, the band played two nights at Crypt Record's Bad Music Seminar alongside bands such as Thee Mighty Caesars, The Raunch Hands, The A-Bones and Rat Bastards. The band returned to Southern California and promptly broke up.

Bassist Wally Hersom went on to play with Big Sandy & His Fly-Rite Boys. Guitarist Mick McCarthy and drummer Quinn Millard went on to form the band Medicine Rattle, which released the 1992 album "Unbottled", produced by Billy Zoom of the punk band X, on the label Earth Music. Vocalist Jason Goodman went on to play with The Blazers and the ska band Jump With Joey.

In retrospect, The Grave Diggers' eclectic mix of swing, jazz, trash, garage and punk was ahead of its time, a 1980s precursor to the swing revival and garage rock revival of the late 1990s and early 2000s. More than twenty years after the band's breakup, copies of the Bobbette EP were being sought by collectors despite the songs being legally available on-line.

In 2013, Tim Warren of Crypt Records re-released the "Move It" LP as a double gatefold featuring archival photos of the band, art by guitarist Mick McCarthy, and liner notes by rock critic Chris Morris and Bobbette Records owner Mark Lee Goodale. The ten unreleased songs from the Coyote Studios session remain unreleased.
