= The Shames =

American garage rock band

- Origin: Ipswich, Massachusetts, United States
- Genres: Garage rock, rock and roll, protopunk
- Years active: 1965-1967
- Labels: RFT Music Productions
- Past members: Denis Trudel; James "JB" Amero; Patty "Beetle" Germoni; Gerard Trudel; Joey Amerault

The Shames were a garage rock band from Ipswich, Massachusetts who were active in the mid-1960s. They are known amongst collectors for two songs which are highly regarded: "Special Ones" and especially "My World is Upside Down," which has been mentioned as a classic in the genre.

The Shames formed in 1964 as the Dimensions. Later they changed their name to the Cryin' Shames, as a comment about the disparaging remarks they would receive about the length of their hair (something to the effect of "...what a cryin' shame..."). Their membership consisted of Denis Trudel on lead vocals, James "JB" Amero on lead guitar, Patty "Beetle" Germoni on keyboards, Gerard Trudel on bass, and Joey Amerault on drums. After the success of the Chicago band with the same, they dropped "Cryin'" from the title and became the Shames. They became a popular draw in the New England and upstate New York region, doing frequent gigs at a number of venues and played regularly at the Sillouette Club in Beverly, Massachusetts. Their manager was Charles L. Larrivee. The Shames recorded a single for RFT Music Productions in 1966, featuring "My World is Upside Down," written by J. Amero and R. Beauleir, b/w "The Special Ones," by D. Trudel. For the first batch of pressings, which appeared on a red label, the printers forgot to not put the band's name on the label. So, the record had to be re-pressed in a second batch—this time with a yellow label. Both songs were released in 1986 on the Back from the Grave, Volume 6 compilation by Crypt Records.

Their song "My World is Upside Down" has been noted as a garage rock classic and "Special Ones" is also highly regarded. In Mike Markesich's Teenbeat Mayhem, both songs are mentioned in list of the top 1000 garage songs of all time (out of the over 16,000 records included in the book) decided on by a panel of garage rock experts and writers, both are in the upper quarter of rankings. "My World Is Upside Down" is ranked in the top 200 at the position of #197 and "Special Ones" at #220 respectively. Remarking on "My World is Upside Down", Tim Warren of Crypt Records has called it "...by far the best garage record out of the entire New England area."

== Membership ==
- Denis Trudel (lead vocals)
- James "JB" Amero (lead guitar)
- Patty "Beetle" Germoni (keyboards)
- Gerard Trudel (bass)
- Joey Amerault (drums)

== Discography ==
"My World is Upside Down" b/w "The Special Ones" (RFT Music Productions, 1966)
