= Tonto and the Renegades =

American garage rock band

Background information
- Origin: Grand Ledge, Michigan, United States
- Genre: Garage rock
- Years active: 1964–1969
- Label: Sound of The Sceen
- Past members: Gary Richey; Terry Slocum; Bill Ford; Tom Kirby; Jeff Keast; Dave Pung

Tonto and the Renegades (also known as Tonto & the Renegades) were an American garage rock band from Grand Ledge, Michigan who were active between 1964 and 1969. They were formed by students from Grand Ledge High School and their name derived from the nickname of their bass player, Gary Richey, who because of his Native American heritage was referred to as "Tonto" by his friends at school. The group had several hits in the Southern Michigan region in 1966 and 1967. By the late 1960s group was being courted by major record labels, when the prospect of the Vietnam War draft caused two members to leave the band, resulting in the group's breakup. The intervening years have witnessed a revival of interest in the band's music amongst garage rock enthusiasts. Tonto and the Renegades are now best known for their song "Little Boy Blue", which is today regarded as a garage rock classic. In 2012 Tonto and The Renegades were inducted into the Michigan Rock and Roll Legends online Hall of Fame.

== History ==
=== Origins ===
Tonto and the Renegades were founded in 1964 by four grade school students in Grand Ledge, Michigan. When the band was formed, all of the band's four original members Tom Kirby, Terry Slocum, Bill Ford, and Gary Richey, were 8th graders at Grand Ledge High School (though a high school, it had an eighth grade class). Two years earlier in 1962, while their drummer Kirby was fourteen and in 6th grade, growing up in a subdivision just outside Grand Ledge, he expressed interest to his parents that he wanted to learn to play percussion, they bought him a drum set and arranged for him to take lessons from a retired music professor who had retired from Michigan State University. Kirby and his older brother Randy played in his first band, the Grandaires. The Grandaires repertoire consisted primarily of covers of Chuck Berry, Ray Charles, and other hits of the day, but they broke up shortly thereafter. Terry Slocum, who grew up on a farm, started out playing a clarinet which his mother, a fan of Pete Fountain, bought him. Slocum became a fan of rock and roll after hearing his brother play his collection of rockabilly, R&B, and early Motown records. A pivotal moment for Slocum was when he watched the Beatles perform on the Ed Sullivan Show which convinced him to start playing in a rock band. He took his clarinet to Marshall Music in Lansing and traded it for a guitar the following day. His father tried to discourage him from playing the new instrument, claiming that he would never master it, but he persisted, spending most of his spare time practicing in his room, intent on proving his father wrong. Bill Ford grew up on the outskirts of Grand Ledge next to Highway 43. He began playing guitar in 1962, following brief spell of attempting to learn the drums. He took guitar lessons, and improved to the point where he was able to teach guitar at the Zvonar Music Studios in Charlotte, Michigan. Like Slocum, Ford remembers being "completely blown away listening to the music of the Beatles". He did not yet have an amplifier, so he compensated by plugging his guitar into a tape recorder owned by his uncle, but ended up blowing out the speakers. He then saved up to buy and amplifier. Kirby, Slocum, and Ford started practicing together informally during their eighth grade year and played in a number of talent shows. They added fellow schoolmate Bob Dick to the lineup and later that year and named their act the Henchmen.

=== Entrance of "Tonto" ===
Eventually Dick left the Henchmen and they brought in Gary Richey on guitar and vocals. Richey was classmate of Kirby, Slocum, and Ford at Grand Ledge High, and because he was of Native American heritage, Richey had acquired the nickname "Tonto" at school. Like the other members of the Henchmen, he was an enthusiast of the Beatles and the British Invasion bands. And, like Kirby, he also grew up in a subdivision on the outskirts of town. Before joining the Henchmen, Richey owned a small tape recorder on which he would record his voice singing along to the Beatles' songs. His parents were supportive of his interest in music, and bought him a guitar and paid for lessons. After two months of learning the basics of the instrument, Richey was invited into the Henchmen. Richey's parents were eager to make their home basement available and it became the Henchmen's rehearsal space. The band practiced there daily after school. Once they began to land gigs, Richey's father offered to become the group's manager. Not long after Richey joined the band, they decided to change their name to a moniker suggested by one of their classmates at Grand Ledge High, Toby Bates, who was also a member of the local group the Beaux Gens, who would later record "She Was Mine". The name he suggested was Tonto and the Renegades, which mixed Richey's nickname along with "Renegades". Through Richey's cousin, the band enlisted the services of a young artist named Dennis Preston to design a cartoon logo of an Indian carrying a hatchet to paint on the bass drumhead of Tom Kirby's Ludiwg oyster pearl drum set. Upon entering the group Richey became their leader.

Richey and Slocum sang most of the band's songs, and unlike most of their local competitors, this group was adept at harmonies. Their first live performance as Tonto and the Renegades as was at the Grand Ledge High School Senior Prom held in the spring of 1964. At the show, Kirby's older brother Randy came up from the audience and sang Ray Charles' "What'd I Say", a number that they had performed in the Grandaires. The band started to become popular in the Lansing area and was booked almost every weekend. None of the band members yet had members drivers' licenses, so in the band's early days Richey's parents usually provided transportation to gigs. The band members bought most of their equipment at Marshall Music, located on S. Washington Avenue in downtown Lansing. It was a favorite hangout for the area's young musicians, and most bought their instruments there. The store also sold records including local 45's issued by the teen bands in and around the Lansing area. Bill Lewis, who worked at the store, helped the band with their gear and quickly became friends with the band's members. Tonto and The Renegades became a regular fixture at The Sceen, a teen nightclub located about twelve miles from Grand Ledge at the intersection of Michigan Highways 43 and 50. The building had formerly been a motel before owner Don Tenfry gutted it and converted it to a music and dance venue. The facility, known for having good acoustics, had four stages and a large outside patio. The Sceen attracted large teenage crowds from surrounding small farming communities such as Woodbury, Sunfield, Muliken, Needmore. According to Billford, "It was an absolute blast playing there". Top Michigan bands such as the Bossmen, the Ones, and the Woolies played there regularly.

=== Expanded lineup and recording ===
Eventually Gary Richey switched to playing bass, augmenting Terry Slocum and Bill Ford on guitars and Tom Kirby on drums. Tonto and The Renegades established a good working relationship with Don Trefry at The Sceen and he became their booking agent. Tenfry was able to land numerous gigs for the band, which included venues such as the Hullabaloo in Lansing, Daniel's Den in Saginaw, and the Club Ponytail in Harbor Springs. The Club Ponytail had previously been a speakeasy during Prohibition and was reputed to have had connections to Al Capone. Tonto and The Renegades appeared there on several occasions, opening for popular acts such as the Beach Boys and Mitch Ryder and The Detroit Wheels. The band's motto printed on their business card was "Beat Music for all occasions".

In 1966, the band decided to add a keyboard player providing them with the flexibility to play a greater variety of material, including popular Motown songs. Bands played original numbers, but were also expected to play covers of popular hits of the day to satisfy dance audiences. Gary Richey discovered keyboardist Jeff Keast, and he was added to the band's roster before they recorded their first single. Keast was not from Grand Ledge and attended O'Rafferty Catholic High School in Lansing. He was a capable musician and could play both the organ and piano at the same time while singing and dancing on stage. Don Trefry arranged for the band to record its first single "Little Boy Blue", written by Terry Slocum, b/w "I Knew This Thing Would Happen" at Dave Kalmbach's Great Lakes Recording Studio in Sparta, Michigan, which was released in late 1966. The band rehearsed extensively in the Richey's basement in preparation for the recording. Kalmbach owned Fenton Records and offered his customers the option of either releasing their singles on his label or designing their own vanity label. Trefry financed the recording which would be released on his own Sound Of The Sceen label, named for his club, The Sceen.

The group picked up the first batch of records, packed in a cardboard box, at the American Record Pressing plant in Owosso. They distributed them to Marshall Music and all the record stores in Grand Ledge, and then drove to various radio stations bringing copies to DJs in the hopes of receiving airplay. In the mid-1960s, it was still possible for local bands to get their songs played on AM radio stations and DJs still had the power to do organize their own programming. Both sides of the single got extensive airplay, especially at WJIM-AM out of Lansing, which was at the time the most popular Top 40 station in Southwest Michigan. Station disc jockey Eric O. was a backer, and the band did a number of short promos at the station to push the 45. "I Knew This Thing Would Happen" was the bigger hit of the two at the time, but the fuzz-drenched "Little Boy Blue" would later become a favorite of garage rock enthusiasts, and is now regarded as a classic in the genre. The success of the single not only increased the band's popularity, but allowed them to charge more money for gigs.

=== Collaboration with Dick Wagner ===
In 1967, Jeff Keast left the group after just one year. Keast's parents disapproved of his involvement in rock and roll which they considered "the devil's music." Upon his departure Keast recommended a fellow O'Rafferty high school classmate, Dave Pung, to be his replacement on keyboards. Dick Wagner, who Tonto and the Renegades had befriended on the numerous occasions his band, the Bossmen, and they had played at The Sceen. Wagner, who was trying to put a new band together, the Frost, was also working with other groups as a songwriter and producer. He had been impressed with Tonto and the Renegades' single, and told them he had several songs that would be perfect for them, and indicated that he would like to produce their next record. He went to Gary Richey's house and played several of the songs for the band on acoustic guitar. The band particularly liked "Anytime You Want Some Lovin'" which became their choice for the A-side of their second single. The band's initial choice for the B-side was Wagner's "First Day Of May", but Wagner decided to save that song for his new band the Frost. Tonto and The Renegades then settled on another Wagner composition "The Easy Way Out" for B-side.

Manager Don Trefry again financed the recording session at Dave Kalmbach's studio in Sparta, but this time Dick Wagner produced with Kalmbach engineering the session. Wagner wanted to incorporate horns on the recordings. To save costs, drummer Tom Kirby asked Jerry Jensen, the band director at Grand Ledge High School, to recommend horn players from the school band and he singled out two underclassmen, Jim Hall and Ernie Morrow, as the best candidates for the session. The two joined the band in the Richey's basement for rehearsals, while Wagner arranged the horn parts on the spot. Wagner's more sophisticated and experiential production techniques required more recording time and the band spent a whole eight-hour day in the studio to complete the sessions. Richey had come up with well-rehearsed bass parts for both songs, but Wagner asked him to try new ones instead. After trying the new lines, Wagner changed his mind relented, feeling that Richey's initial ones worked best. Wagner contributed a fuzz-drench guitar line to "Anytime You Want Some Lovin'" and brought in Donny Hartman, a fellow member from his new band, Frost, to play on the track. Wagner eventually went back to Richey's initial bass line when his new idea didn't pan out, and also brought in Donny Hartman, his new Frost bandmate, to play on the track. Hartman added harmonica to the final recorded version of the song; a fine mid-tempo rock ballad featuring gorgeous band harmonies. Hartman added harmonica to the final recorded version of the song, which displayed the band's rich harmonies. The second single, like the first, was released on Trefry's Sound Of The Sceen label and both sides became hits the Lansing area, with WJIM providing a big push of the record. Tonto and The Renegades made their first television appearance on Swing Lively, a teen music program on Channel 6 in Lansing.

=== Interest of major labels, Vietnam draft, and breakup ===
All of the group's members graduated from high school in June 1968. Just as national record labels began to express interest in the band and their latest single, the prospect of the Vietnam War draft became a pressing issue. After graduating from high school, Bill Ford was the first band member to be targeted by the Selective Service. An instructor at Lansing Community College convinced him to enroll in full-time classes there to receive a 2-A deferment. He later transferred to Michigan State University where he earned a B.A. degree in political science. After Ford's departure, Tonto and The Renegades returned to a four-member lineup. Terry Slocum got married in 1968, and he was therefore able to receive a 3-A draft deferment. With the success of the new single, the band was earning $1,000 per night and receiving offers from major record companies such as Capitol, Columbia, Decca, and the U.S.A. label who had recently signed Saginaw's the Cherry Slush. Gary Richey and Tom Kirby knew they were also facing the prospect draft but preferred to concentrate on the record deal offers coming in for the band. Columbia's offer was especially generous with the promise of a $10,000 advance, a national tour, and an album to be recorded after the tour.

After Tom Kirby received his draft notice in 1969, he left the band and quickly volunteered for the Navy to avoid field combat, but still ended up serving three consecutive tours of duty in Vietnam aboard the Destroyer U.S.S. Hollister. He saw action in the South China Sea, the Gulf of Tonkin, and many of the rivers and canals along the Vietnam coast. Gary Richey was drafted soon after Kirby, was rejected and classified 4-F because he suffered from eczema a skin disease. The band began to disintegrate after Kirby's departure. Tonto and the Renegades broke up in 1969.

=== Later developments and legacy ===
After the demise of Tonto and the Renegades, Gary Richey and Terry Slocum played together briefly with a band called Headstone, and shortly after Richey joined another group named Thanx. Tom Kirby returned from Viet Nam in 1971 and married a woman from Grand Ledge. He eventually became a systems analyst for the Department of Information Technology at the office of the Michigan Secretary of State. Kirby later divorced but remarried and is now retired. In 2009 he started a two-man band with Jim Hall called Trail's End, and they often play at Mija's Grey Wolf Inn in Grand Ledge. After leaving music in the 1970s, Richey became a construction worker, but was injured on the job, and is now on living on disability in Lansing. Slocum briefly joined the armed forces, but after returning left Michigan, and moved to Memphis, then Florida. He has continued to play music over the years on guitar in several rock bands, as well as blues. On one occasion, he played at a show with Buddy Guy at a roadhouse in Clarksdale, Mississippi. After graduating from MSU, Bill Ford got married and moved to Wisconsin, entered law school at University of Wisconsin at Madison. To pay tuition, he sold the guitar and amplifier he had used with Tonto and the Renegades. He worked as an attorney for 30 years in Wisconsin and retired in 2009.

Although Tonto and the Renegades broke up in 1969, the subsequent reissues of their songs in the intervening years have sparked a renewal of interest and the band—gaining them at last a worldwide following. Their song "Little Boy Blue" was re-issued on the Back from the Grave, Volume 4 (LP), and Back from the Grave, Volume 2 (CD). All four of the recordings made by Tonto and The Renegades at the Great Lakes Recording Studio in Sparta, Michigan, were included in the 2-CD Scream Loud!!! The Fenton Story, released in 2007. These four recordings were also compiled onto an EP by Misty Lane Records out of Italy. Tonto and The Renegades were inducted into the Michigan Rock and Roll Legends online Hall of Fame in 2012. Three of their recordings have been named Legendary Michigan Songs: "Little Boy Blue" in 2008, along with "Anytime You Want Some Lovin'" and "The Easy Way Out" in 2012.

== Membership ==
- Gary Richey (lead vocals and bass)
- Terry Slocum (lead vocals and guitars)
- Bill Ford (guitar and backing vocals)
- Tom Kirby (drums and backing vocals)
- Jeff Keast (keyboards)
- Dave Pung (keyboards)

== Discography ==
- "Little Boy Blue" b/w "I Knew this Thing Would Happen" (Sound of The Sceen 2212, July 1967)
- "Anytime You Want Some Lovin'" b/w "The Easy Way Out" (Sound of The Sceen, 1967)
