= The Grifs =

American garage rock band from North Carolina

- Origin: Charlotte, North Carolina, United States
- Genre: Garage rock
- Years active: 1965-1968
- Labels: 5-D, Palmer
- Past members: Barry Stacks; Mike Wingate; Bob Crawford; Roy Skinner

The Grifs were an American garage rock band from Charlotte, North Carolina, who were active in the 1960s. Their song, "Catch a Ride" became the number one hit in Charlotte and did well in markets around the Carolinas, and reached number one in Birmingham, Alabama. The group was able to secure airplay in northern markets, such as in Lansing, Michigan, where it reached number one, as well as in the Detroit area and parts of Canada. They were invited to open for the Amboy Dukes in Detroit, where they began to play frequent engagements in the Michigan region, and recorded their second single, "Keep Dreaming", in Detroit. Just when the Grifs prospects looked hopeful, drummer Roy Skinner departed and guitarist Mike Wingate received a draft notice to go to Vietnam. By early 1968, the group folded. Their work is now highly regarded by garage rock enthusiasts and several of their songs have appeared on compilations.

== History ==
The Grifs began in Charlotte, North Carolina in 1965. Their lineup consisted of Mike Wingate on vocals and guitar, Barry Stacks on guitar, Bob Crawford on bass, and Roy Skinner on drums. They were influenced by the British Invasion, particularly the tough blues-based sound of the Rolling Stones. Their first single, "Catch a Ride" b/w "In My Life", was recorded at Arthur Smith's studio in Charlotte and was released on 5-D Records. The fuzz-toned guitar heard on "Catch a Ride" was played by Barry Stacks and was inspired by the Rolling Stones' hit "Satisfaction", in which Keith Richards helped popularize the device. Stacks recounts:

A couple of days before we recorded "Catch a Ride", the Stones released "Satisfaction". And I heard that fuzz tone, and I went to a music store, and I said, "What's is that? Whatever it is, I want one.

On the way to the studio, Stacks worked out his guitar part. After the band completed their session, James Brown came in with his band to do a session. Recalls Stacks:

We booked the studio for four hours, eight o'clock till midnight. The guy that was running the board for Arthur Smith said we had to be packed up and of there by midnight. I said, "What are you talking about?" He said, "We're booked all night, after midnight. We did what we had to do, but as we were packing up, this band comes in to start setting up, and it was James Brown and the Famous Flames... And James said, "Why don't you and your boys sit up in the control room while we record?"

"Catch a Ride" became the number one hit in Charlotte, receiving airplay on WGIV, WAYS and WIST and also number one in Birmingham, Alabama. The song reached to top five in Hickory, North Carolina and Myrtle Beach. The group developed a good working relationship with WIST disc jockey, John Fox. In exchange for spins, the group played a live performance broadcast from radio studio free of charge. Their single was later picked up by AMG Records in a distribution deal with MGM. The band also developed connections with CKLU in Canada, where the song received airplay. DJ Fox had connections in Detroit and was able to get airplay for them there. In Lansing, Michigan the song reached number one on the local charts. The band was offered to go to Detroit to open for the Amboy Dukes, whose membership at the time included Ted Nugent. After the success of "Catch a Ride", the group began playing throughout the region, doing gigs in North and South Carolina, such as in Myrtle Beach, Spartanburg, Columbia, and even in Birmingham, Alabama. They opened for the Rolling Stones, the Dave Clark Five, the Hollies, Herman's Hermits, and the Kinks.

The Grifs continued to work the southern circuit, but spent time in Detroit, playing in the Motor City and its surrounding towns. In 1967, they recorded their next single in Detroit for Palmer Records. The A-side "Keep Dreaming" was a tough Rolling Stones-influenced number, but the B-side "Northbound" was more pop-oriented and included a backing horn section. The B-side was beginning to catch on at soul stations in Detroit, but listeners were often shocked to find out that the A-Side was hard rock. The group was preparing to record an album when drummer Roy Skinner left to go back to pharmacy school, where he had received a scholarship. The band auditioned several other drummers but were not satisfied. Guitarist Mike Wingate received a draft notice to report to Vietnam. Offers for gigs began to dry up. By early 1968 the group had disbanded.

Several of the group's members returned to Charlotte, but Stacks went to California and became involved with the music scene there for a number of years. Mike Westgate is now deceased. The Grifs recordings have been reissued on several compilations such as Michigan Mayhem, Volumes 1 and 2 and Psychedelic UnknownsHickory N.C. and Mytyle S.C. "Keep Dreaming" is included on Back from the Grave, Volume 7 put out by Crypt Records in 1988.

== Membership ==
- Mike Wingate (vocals and guitar)
- Barry Stacks (guitar)
- Bob Crawford (bass)
- Roy Skinner (drums)

== Discography ==
- "Catch a Ride" b/w "In My Life" (5-D #007, November 1966/AMG 1002, February 1967)
- "Keep Dreaming" b/w "Northbound" (Palmer 5025, August 1967)

== Bibliography ==
- Berger, Jacob; Coston, Daniel (2014). There Was a Time: Rock & Roll in the 1960s in Charlotte and North Carolina (1st ed.). Charlotte: Fort Canoga Press. ISBN 9780615809403.
- Markesich, Mike (2012). Teenbeat Mayhem (1st ed.). Branford, Connecticut: Priceless Info Press. ISBN 978-0-985-64825-1.
