= Sir Winston and the Commons =

American garage-rock band, formed 1963

Background information
- Also known as: The Illusions; Sir Winston
- Origin: Indianapolis, Indiana, United States
- Genres: Garage rock; psychedelic rock
- Years active: 1963 - 1969
- Labels: Soma; Nauseating Butterfly!
- Past members: Don Basore; Joe Stout; Gary Crawford; John Medvescek; Ron Matelic; Herb Crawford

Sir Winston and the Commons were an American garage rock band formed in Indianapolis, Indiana, in 1963. The group released two highly regarded singles, which, upon release, earned the band a regional following, and resulted in reinterest in their music over the years. At the height of their popularity, Sir Winston and the Commons were regulars at the teen dance club the Cellar, in Chicago.

== History ==
Originally established as the Illusions in 1963, the group's lineup included high schoolers Don Basore (bass guitar) Joe Stout (saxophone), Gary Crawford (lead guitar), Ron Matelic (rhythm guitar), and John Medvescek (drums). With a setlist that consisted mostly of surf rock instrumentals, the Illusions became a popular local attraction as mainstays in the area's teen dance clubs and promotional record label functions. The group readjusted its musical stance to include cover versions of Top 40 hits, as did many garage rock acts, when the British Invasion came to the United States in 1964. Around the same period, the Illusions changed their name to the English-sounding Sir Winston and the Commons, and Crawford was replaced by Herb Crawford (no relation).

The band established a loyal following, amassing enough attention to charter buses of fans, and perform at gigs in Chicago's popular music venue the Cellar as the opening act for the Byrds, the McCoys, and the Beach Boys, among others. In 1965, Sir Winston and the Commons, while in Chicago, recorded "We're Gonna Love" and "Come Back Again" at Columbia Records Studios. In May 1966, the songs were released for the band's debut single on Soma Records, and achieved success, despite its limited pressing, in Minnesota." Fellow Indianapolis group the Emblems covered "We're Gonna Love", which was issued on the Lambia record label later in the year.

In 1967, Sir Winston and the Commons issued their second and final single, "Not the Spirit of India", on their self-produced Nauseating Butterfly! Records. The composition, with its combination of psychedelia and Indian influences was progressive for the era. Matelic explains "Herb Crawford, our other guitarist, handled the 'Not the Sprit of India' record from the label to the pressings. He and I co-wrote the song. I developed the music and he did the lyrics. There was an electric India vibe that was around at the time. The influence may have, in part, come from Paul Butterfield Blues Band’s 'East-West'. In 1967, the group relocated to the Sunset Strip to attempt to reach the national stage, and became the house band for the Galaxy Club for six months. There were arrangements for Sir Winston and the Commons to tour Europe; however, the group declined as they were against the idea of assuming the persona of another group. The band returned to Indianapolis and continued to perform as Sir Winston until their disbandment in 1969.

Since their break up, the band's material has appeared on numerous compilation albums, including Back from the Grave, Volume 3, Hoosier Hotshots, Sixties Rebellion, The Apple-Glass Syndrom, and The Soma Records Story, Volume 1. In 1999, Sundazed Music released an EP of all the band's released material, and in 2010 a previously unissued song, "All of the Time", is featured on You Tore My Brain! Unissued Sixties Garage Acetates, Volume 5. Two of their previously unreleased songs, "All of the Time" and "No Sorrow" were included on You Tore My Brain!, the fifth volume of Norton Records' Unnissued sixties Garage Acetates series. In Mike Markesich's book, Teenbeat Mayhem, in the section that ranks the top 1000 garage rock songs of all time, voted on by a panel of noted garage writers and experts (out of the more than 16,000 US-recorded songs mentioned in the book), "We're Gonna Love" ranks #416, placing it in the top 500 American garage rock records.

== Membership ==
- Don Basore (bass)
- Joe Stout (saxophone)
- Gary Crawford (lead guitar)
- John Medvescek (drums)
- Ron Matelic (drums)
- Herb Crawford (lead guitar)

== Discography ==
- "All of the Time" b/w "Come Back Again" (Jan Eden Rec. & Sound, April 1966 - acetate)
- "No Sorrow" b/w "We're Gonna Love" (Jan Eden Rec & Sound, April 1966 - acetate)
- "We're Gonna Love" b/w "Come Back Again" - (Soma Records #1454, May 1966)
- "Not the Spirit of India" b/w "One Last Chance" (Nauseating Butterfly! #2207, 1967)

== Bibliography ==
- Markesich, Mike (2012). Teenbeat Mayhem (1st ed.). Branford, Connecticut: Priceless Info Press. ISBN 978-0-985-64825-1.
