= The Sloths =

American garage rock band

- From left to right: Hank Daniels, Michael Rummans, Jeff Briskin, Steve Dibner and Sam Kamarass in 1965

Background information
- Origin: Los Angeles, California, United States
- Genres: Garage rock
- Years active: 1964-1966, 2012-2016
- Labels: Impression; Burger
- Past members: Michael Rummans; Jeff Briskin; Hank Daniels; Steve Dibner; Sam Kamarass; Tommy McLoughlin; Dave Provost; Jose Rendon; Mark Weddington; Patrick DiPuccio; Ray Herron

The Sloths are an American garage rock band formed in Los Angeles, California, in 1964. Although short-lived, the band had a profound presence on the Sunset Strip's live scene, and their lone single, "Makin' Love", while not very commercially successful during its original release, has been heavily praised since its inclusion on the Back from the Grave series. The Sloths, after their re-discovery by music historians, are now considered to be one of the "great lost garage bands", and surviving band members have been conducting reunion tours since 2012.

== History ==
Founding members Michael Rummans (lead guitar) and Jeff Briskin (rhythm guitar), both students enrolled at Beverly Hills High School, initially showed interest in forming the Sloths after a few months of jam sessions in 1963. Student transfer Hank Daniels (lead vocalist), who was receiving attention for his proto-hippie hairstyle, joined the band and was soon followed by Steve Dibner (bass guitar) Sam Kamarass (drums). Inspired by the more hard-edged R&B groups of the British Invasion, the Sloths encompassed cover versions of songs recorded by the Rolling Stones, the Yardbirds, and Them into their repertoire, which the band adamantly rehearsed at Dibner's house. After performing at social gatherings and school concerts, the Sloths made their professional debut at the Stratford, a club on the Sunset Strip.

By 1965, the band was deeply intertwined in the Strip's live scene, appearing regularly at venues such as Pandora's Box, the Hullabaloo, and the Whisky a Go Go, and sharing the bill with highly-influential Los Angeles acts, including the Seeds, the Doors, and Love. Later in the year, Impression Records approached the Sloths to record their debut single at CBS Studios. Described by music critic Jonny Whiteside as a "masterpiece of overstimulated teenage arousal", it featured the two original songs "Makin' Love" and "You Mean Everything to Me". Although the single was not too commercially successful, largely due to a lack of promotional support, another garage band, the Dirty Shames, covered "Makin' Love" a year later on the same record label. In 1966, Briskin left the band to enroll in law school; thus, causing the Sloths to disband by the end of year. Rummans found the most immediate success after the group's break-up by joining the Yellow Payges.

The Sloths may have languished in obscurity had it not been for their recording of "Makin' Love" appearing on the 1984 compilation album Back from the Grave, Volume 4, reigniting interest in the group. Other albums the song is featured on includes Gravel, Volume 5. When an original copy of "Makin' Love" was reported to have sold for $6,500 in 2011, writer Mike Stax of Ugly Things magazine tracked down Briskin to conduct an interview and release a limited-edition of the Sloths' lone single. Stax commented "Makin' Love" was the standout of Back from the Grave, Volume 4: "So primal, so elemental. It had that caveman primitivism about it". In turn, Briskin reached out to surviving member Rummans, and though he discovered Daniels and Kamarass had died, the two arranged reunion concerts in Los Angeles by recruiting a new line-up consisting of Tommy McLoughlin (lead vocals), Dave Provost (bass guitar), and Jose Rendon (drums) in 2012.

In 2015, The Sloths, now featuring McLoughlin, Mark Weddington (guitar), Patrick DiPuccio (guitar), Rummans, and Ray Herron (drums), released the album Back from the Grave on the indie rock label Burger Records. Music critic Alyson Camus praised it for "a large diversity throughout the album" and compared McLoughlin's vocal delivery to Iggy Pop. In January 2019, the band released the video, "Haunted", featured in the horror film, The Amityville Murders.

The group continued to tour behind the release of Back from the Grave leading up to March 2020, at which time all touring was put on hold due to the great pandemic.

== Discography ==
=== Single ===
- "Makin' Love" b/w "You Mean Everything to Me" - Impression Records (#IMP-104), 1965

=== Album ===
- Back from the Grave - Burger Records (#BRGR623), 2015
