= The Brigands (band) =

American garage rock band

- Origin: U.S.A.
- Genres: Garage rock, Beat
- Years active: 1966
- Label: Epic

The Brigands were an American garage rock act who are best known for the 1966 song, "(Would I Still Be) Her Big Man", which appeared as the A-side of a single released on Epic Records. Little is known about them other than that the song was recorded in New York City. Their origins are unknown, but some have attributed their residence to Forest Hills, Long Island, New York. Others have speculated that they were an ensemble of session musicians who recorded the song as a one-time act under the moniker "the Brigands." One reason mentioned by exponents of this hypothesis is that there would be more known about them, if they had indeed been an actual performing unit. They point out that there are no printed artifacts available, such as flyers and listings of live performances, records of battles of the bands, and newspaper clippings. They also point out that, since the song was released on Epic Records and produced by Artie and Kris Resnick, who wrote the Young Rascals' "Good Lovin'" and other popular hits of the time, it is unlikely that such an unknown band would have received the attention of such well-known and established fixtures, unless the song had been recorded by a "ghost band" of session musicians under their tutelage.

A 2002 video on Forest Hills High School's website about a reunion of Forest Hills (Queens, NY) High School students features an Anderson Cooper interview with two alumni (Elliott Wertheim and John Hartmann) who were in The Brigands. Wertheim and Hartmann give some background of The Brigands and how their sole Epic Records single came to be.

The Brigands's song, "(Would I Still Be) Her Big Man," has appeared on various compilations such as the Back from the Grave, Volume 2 LP, released in 1983 and the Nuggets 4-CD box set released in 1998.

== (Would I Still Be) Her Big Man ==
"(Would I Still Be) Her Big Man"

Single by The Brigands
- B-side: "I'm a Patient Man"
- Released: 1966
- Recorded: 1966
- Genre: Garage rock
- Length: 2:20
- Label: Epic
- Songwriters: Artie Resnick and Kris Resnick
- Producers: Artie Resnick and Kris Resnick

"(Would I Still Be) Her Big Man" is a song by the Brigands, an American garage rock band. It appeared as the A-side of a single recorded in New York City and released on Epic Records, and was written and produced by Artie and Kris Resnick, who wrote the Rascals' "Good Lovin'" and other popular hits of the time. The song's lyrics depict the worries of a factory worker who spends his hard-earned money dressing up to impress his lover, a woman with expensive tastes, but wonders if she will still love him when she finds out that he is working class. The song has appeared on various compilations such as the Back from the Grave, Volume 2 LP, released in 1983 and the Nuggets 4-CD box set released in 1998.

- "(Would I Still Be) Her Big Man" b/w "I'm a Patient Man" (Epic 10011, April 1966)
