= Larry and the Blue Notes =

American garage rock band

Background information
- Also known as: The Mark V; The Bad; Soul Purpose
- Origin: Fort Worth, Texas, United States
- Genres: Garage rock
- Years active: 1962–1968
- Labels: Charay; 20th century
- Past members: Larry Slater; Larry Roquemore; Mike Griffins; Randy Cates; Jack Hammonds; Rocky Shores; Buddy Bates; Dan Fletcher

Larry and the Blue Notes were an American garage rock band formed in Fort Worth, Texas in 1962. The group is one of the more notable musical acts to emerge from the flourishing Fort Worth teen scene, and one of the few that had the opportunity to release a nationally distributed record. They are best known for the song "Night of the Sadist", which has been revived on several compilation albums.

== History ==
In October 1962, Rocky Shores (drums) recruited Larry Roquemore (saxophone, vocals) and Larry Slater (lead guitar) to perform at a Halloween party, with Slater bringing along rhythm guitarist Tommy Skaggs. Originally, the group's set list included mostly surf music instrumentals inspired by Freddie King, whom the band held a strong admiration for. Following their first gig, Slater and Roquemore began rehearsals in new drummer Mike Griffins' garage, also accompanied by Dan Fletcher (bass guitar) and rhythm guitarist Buddy Bates. In 1964, after establishing themselves as top-tier competitors in battle of the bands tourneys in Fort Worth, Larry and the Blue Notes replaced Fletcher with Randy Cates and recruited Jack Hammonds (organ, vocals). The new members had some prior experience as vocalists, providing the group with enough expertise to replicate the lush vocal harmonies of the Beatles.

Larry and the Blue Notes became fixtures at Fort Worth's most popular venue, the Teen A-Go-Go. In 1965, the band attracted the attention of record producer Major Bill Smith, who is best known for his hand in recording national hits such as "Hey Paula" by Paul and Paula. The group entered the studio to cut the Roquemore and Slater-penned "Night of the Sadist", recording two versions: one with a saxophone instrumental and another which featured a guitar solo. However, neither version was released because Smith, concerned with the word "sadist" potentially barring airplay, had Larry and the Blue Notes dub "phantom" in place wherever the term occurred. Roquemore explains that several urban legends inspired the tune, including "the escaped mental patient with a hook on his right hand who used to terrorize parkers in Lover's Lane; a guy dressed in a gorilla suit who used to tap on car windows of couples parking late at night at my old school, Northside High; and tales of a Goat Man who was scaring the crap out of parkers at Lake Worth".

"Night of the Phantom" was released on Larry and the Blue Notes' debut single in early 1965 on Tiris Records. The resulting regional hit prompted 20th Century Records to negotiate for publishing rights, making "Night of the Phantom" one of the few releases from the Fort Worth teen scene to reach a national audience. A follow-up, "Talk About Love," appeared in late-1965 on the Charay label, but did not fare as well on the regional charts until a punkish version was released in its place. Afterwards, Larry and the Blue Notes would release some of their records under different band names such as with the single "The Phantom," but under the pseudonym, the Mark V, of a song conceived by local deejay Mark Stevens as an identifier for the "Phantom." Other singles by the group were released as the Bad and later as Soul Purpose when soul music became popular. In 1966 the band released a single, once again as Larry and the Blue Notes, the pounding "In and Out" b/w "There's No Other Like My Baby" on Charay. The label would re-release the song again as a single several times over the next year with alternating flipsides. The band would break up in 1968.

In the intervening years since Larry and the Blue Notes' disbandment, their song "Night of the Sadist" (or "Night of the Phantom") has appeared on several compilation albums. The "Night of the Sadist" version appears on Back from the Grave, Volume 4, Acid Dreams – Epitaph, Fort Worth Teen Scene, Volume 1, and Acid Dreams (2014 version). As for "Night of the Phantom", the song is compiled on Back from the Grave, Volume 1, Fort Worth Teen Scene – Major Bill Tapes, Volume 2, and Fort Worth Teen Scene, Volume 2. Their protopunk anthem "In and Out" has become one of their most highly regarded songs over the years and has appeared on Teenage Shutdown! The World Ain't Round, It's Square!, Fort Worth Teen Scene, Volume 1, and Fort Worth Teen Scene, Volume 3.

Larry Roquemore died on August 21, 2016, aged 69.

== Discography ==
- "Night of the Phantom" b/w "All My Own" (Tiris 101, March 1965) (Twentieth Century Fox 573, April 1965)
- "Talk About Love" b/w "She'll Love Me" (Charay 20, 1965)
- "Everybody Needs Somebody to Love" b/w "She'll Love Me" (Charay, 1095) (Epic 9871, December 1965—under the pseudonym "The Bad")
- "The Phantom" b/w "She'll Love Me" (released under pseudonym "The Mark V") (Charay 20, 1965)
- "In and Out" b/w "There's No Other Like My Baby" (Charay 44, July 1966)
- "In and Out" b/w "Love Is a Beautiful Thing (Charay, November 1966)
- "In and Out" b/w "No Milk Today" (Charay, December 1966)
- "In and Out" b/w "I'll Be True to You" (Charay, February 1967)
- 'In and Out" b/w "You Cheated You Lied" (Charay, July 1967)
