= The Unrelated Segments =

American garage rock band

Background information
- Origin: Taylor, Michigan, United States
- Genres: Garage rock; proto-punk
- Years active: 1966-1969
- Labels: SVR
- Past members: Ron Stults; Rory Mack; John Torok; Barry Van Engelen; Andy Angellotti; Darrell Gore; Ron Fuller

The Unrelated Segments were an American garage rock band from Taylor, Michigan, that were active between 1966 and 1969. The group was a popular musical act in Michigan, achieving regional acclaim for their song, "Story of My Life".

== History ==
The nucleus of the Unrelated Segments was spearheaded by lead vocalist, Ron Stults, and lead guitarist Rory Mack, the two previously playing together in a short-lived band called The Village Beaus. Stults and Mack were shuffling between groups when a fellow musician, rhythm guitarist John Torok, invited the two, along with bass guitarist Barry Van Engelen and drummer Andy Angellotti, to a jam session. The group experimented with chord patterns and guitar licks, while playing popular songs. By the second rehearsal together, Stults and Mack co-wrote the band's most successful song, "Story of My Life". Within two weeks after the rehearsal, the band officially formed, and began performing locally.

On November 26, 1966, they entered the nearby United Sound studio to record the track for their debut single with the song, "It's Unfair", being the flip-side. The sessions were complete in three and a half hours, by which time the band had to prepare for a local performance. In February 1967, the "Story of My Life" single was released on the HBR label, and became a massive hit on Detroit radio, particularly on WKNR Radio. The song also gained significant airplay in other pockets of the Midwest, including a number nine listing on Keener's Music Guide and charting in the top ten in Toledo, Ohio. However, the band was limited by the label's limited promotion and distribution, so the single failed to chart nationally. In the summer of the same year, the Unrelated Segments returned to the studio to cut their second single, "Where You Gonna Go?; " another local smash, it helped the group land live dates at the famed Grande Ballroom opening for acts including Spirit, Spencer Davis Group and Jeff Beck Group. They also opened for the likes of The Who and the MC5.

"Cry, Cry, Cry" followed in the summer of 1968, but failed to match the success of its predecessors; Angellotti was soon dismissed from the line-up, replaced by Ron Fuller who brought a style of drumming akin in style and showmanship to the biggest English bands. After Van Engelen was drafted to serve in Vietnam in early 1969 the Segments recruited new guitarist Darrell Gore, with Torock moving to bass. After changing their name to simply the U.S., they recorded a handful of unreleased tracks before disbanding as the decade drew to a close. The band re-formed and changed the name to “Lost Nation” and recorded on the Rare Earth (Motown) label. In 1998, the Cicadelic label released a comprehensive collection of the Segments' music titled Where You Gonna Go?

== Discography ==
- "Story of My Life" b/w "It's Unfair" - HBR 514 (1967)
- "Where You Gonna Go" b/w "It's Gonna Rain" - Liberty 55992 (1967)
- "Cry, Cry, Cry" b/w "It's Not Fair" - Liberty 56052 (1968)
