= Back from the Grave (series) =

Compilation album series by Various Artists
- Released: 1983–2015
- Recorded: 1960s
- Genre: Garage rock; rock & roll
- Label: Crypt

Back from the Grave is a series compilation albums of 1960s garage rock created and compiled by Tim Warren and released by Crypt Records since 1983. Starting in 1993, the series was reissued on compact disc. Due to the longer playing times offered by CDs, the first seven volumes were contained on four discs, save for a few tracks that were omitted. And, while all of the songs on the first four CDs are included on first seven vinyl albums, they do not necessarily correspond to the individual LPs bearing their same titles. However, the Volume 8 CD corresponds almost directly its LP double-LP counterpart, but with the addition of four bonus tracks not included on the LP. The eight vinyl albums are titled consecutively "Back from the Grave, Volume 1, Volume 2, Volume 3, Volume 4, Volume 5, Volume 6, Volume 7, Volume 8, Volume 9, and Volume 10". In similar fashion the five CDs are titled "Back from the Grave, Volume 1, Volume 2, Volume 3, Volume 4, Volume 8, and Volumes 9 & 10" (which are both included on one CD). There are no volumes 5, 6, or 7 for the CDs. Two separate LPs for Volume 9 and 10 were released in 2015 as well one CD, released the same year, which combines Volumes 9 and 10 onto one double-length disc.

== Description ==
=== Music ===
Unlike many garage rock compilations, the Back from the Grave series focuses exclusively on the rawer and more aggressive side of the genre. Psychedelic rock is categorically excluded. The series also includes very few pop- or folk-oriented songs. As a result, the albums are primarily populated by louder songs that are characterized by fuzztone guitars, rough vocals, and are clearly influenced by groups such as the Rolling Stones, The Yardbirds, the early Kinks, and the Pretty Things. The lyrics and performances tended to focus on anger, lust, and cheating girlfriends, matching the often chaotic music. According to the liner notes, the songs were recorded by American groups, between 1964 and 1967.

=== Packaging ===
The series tends to follow the packaging format established by the Nuggets album and the Pebbles series: each volume includes detailed liner notes that include basic information about each song and group, such as origin and recording date. However, the Back from the Grave series' liner notes are very distinct. The information that they present suggests especially thorough research, often including humorous anecdotes about the artists included, information about the circumstances of the recordings, and brief biographical sketches of the groups, in addition to more basic information. The Back from the Grave series was one of the first to actively seek out bands for this sort of information, sometimes even paying royalties to bands included in the compilations. The liner notes are also notable for their distinctive style – they tend to be highly enthusiastic, full of intentional spelling errors and slang, humorous asides and tangents. They are noticeably opinionated, and often include tongue-in-cheek insults directed at psychedelic, art rock, and commercially-oriented music. As a result, the notes convey a conversational tone. The albums also include photographs of the included groups, and the covers tend to elaborately drawn cartoons by Mort Todd that feature zombies (intended to personify the music found on each volume) emerging from graves and "attacking" various manifestations of the pop-and-progressive-oriented world that had come to musical prominence by the end of the 1980s, such as disco music and MTV.

=== Reception ===
Back from the Grave is considered one of the most important and influential garage rock compilations series ever assembled. Though it takes a much narrower approach to the genre, the tracks compiled on its ten volumes are considered to be of exceptionally high quality throughout. Back from the Grave's influence can be seen in other series that take a similar approach to compiling garage records.

== Albums ==
=== Original series ===
- Back from the Grave, Volume 1 (1983)
- Back from the Grave, Volume 2 (1983)
- Back from the Grave, Volume 3 (1983)
- Back from the Grave, Volume 4 (1984)
- Back from the Grave, Volume 5 (1985)
- Back from the Grave, Volume 6 (1986)
- Back from the Grave, Special Edition: The Tempos (1987)
- Back from the Grave, Volume 7 (1988, double-LP)
- Back from the Grave, Volume 8 (1996, double-LP)
- Back from the Grave, Volume 9 (2015)
- Back from the Grave, Volume 10 (2015)

=== 1990s 4 Part CD Release ===
Release of LP Volume 1 to 7 on four CDs.

- Back from the Grave Part One (U.S. title: Volume One, CD-123, Feb 1993)
- Back from the Grave Part 2 (U.S. title: Volume Two, CD-345, Oct 1993)
- Back from the Grave Part Three (U.S. title: Volume Three, CD-5713, Feb 1994)
- Back from the Grave Part Four (U.S. title: Volume Four, CD-013, Sep 1995)

=== Re-mastered CD/album series (one and two-digipaks, released 2015) ===
Each of these CDs contain either one or two LPs worth of material on one disc and correspond more closely to the original LP series, however there are differences. Volume 8 was not released with this sub-series, but could be considered as forming a bridge between Volume 7 and Volumes 9 & 10.

- Back from the Grave, Volumes 1 and 2 (CRYPT-001)
- Back from the Grave, Volumes 3 and 4 (CRYPT-003)
- Back from the Grave, Volumes 5 and 6 (CRYPT-005)
- Back from the Grave, Volume 9 (Crypt-114) (contains Volumes 9 & 10 of the original series)

== See also ==
- Garage rock
- Nuggets (series)
- Pebbles (series)
