= The Swamp Rats =

American garage rock band

- Also known as: Bob Hocko and the Swamp Rats
- Origin: McKeesport, Pennsylvania, United States
- Genres: Garage rock; proto-punk
- Years active: 1966–1967
- Labels: St. Clair; Co & Ce Keystone; Get Hip
- Spinoff of: The Fantastic Dee Jays
- Past members: Dick Newton; Don Schreiner; Dave Gannon; Bob Hocko; Paul Shalako; Joe Guido; Denny Nicholson

The Swamp Rats were an American garage rock band that hailed from McKeesport, Pennsylvania, a suburb of Pittsburgh. The band achieved regional success with singles mostly consisting of cover versions of popular songs. Their material is considered one of the earliest examples of proto-punk, which has led to re-releases of their work.

== History ==
The band originated from a group known as The Fantastic Dee Jays, which was formed in 1964 by Denny Nicholson, Dick Newton, and Tom Junecko. The three performed locally until being hired by disc jockey, Terry Lee, of WMCK Radio. Lee, who was manager of several other bands, became their manager/producer, and dictated their song lists, uniforms, and purchased their equipment. In live performances, the band performed covers of British Invasion pop songs, and soon gained a following in the Pittsburgh area. In March 1965, the band released their first single, "Apache" b/w "Fight Fire", both cover songs. They would recruit vocalist and drummer, Bob Hocko, for their next releases, which included original material like "Get Away Girl", co-written by all the members. They released a self-titled debut in early 1966 and disbanded soon after.

Terry Lee created the Swamp Rats with Dee Jay member Newton on lead guitar, and newcomers Dave Gannon on drums, and Don Schreiner on guitar. Lee signed the band to the small St. Clair label, and produced their debut single, "Louie Louie" b/w "Hey Joe". The recordings were a contrast to their previous band's material as they were heavier and more punk oriented. Soon after their debut, Hocko returned to the group as lead vocalist, and bassist Paul Shalako was added. They would appear on the band's second release, "Psycho" b/w "Here, There, and Everywhere", again both covers. Gannon would not be involved in the group's further releases, but remained their live drummer. Hocko's vocals on "Psycho" was an example of scream-singing. The band produced several more singles on the same label which sold well in Pittsburgh, and they performed in Lee's dance clubs with revolving lineups. Despite their local popularity, the band suffered from personal disagreements, limited single distribution, and a lack of original material. Lee prevented the band from writing much of their own compositions, which caused disputes between Lee and Newton on what type of material to write. Newton left the band in early 1967 and was replaced by Joe Guido. According to the liner notes for a compilation album released in 2003, “By all accounts, Joe Guido played guitar and/or bass on several Swamp Rats recordings prior to becoming a full-time member”. “According to Hocko, when the band deemed Shalako’s relatively inexperienced bass work inadequate, band friend Joe Guido would re-record the parts, sometimes even adding an extra guitar track while he was at it”. Lee was replaced by Nick Cenci who had the band signed to Co & Ce. for their final single, "In the Midnight Hour". When Guido fled to Canada to escape the draft, the band performed two final gigs with Nicholson returning to the band, before disbanding in mid-1967.

In 1979, following a returning interest in garage rock, the band's material was released on a compilation album titled Disco Sucks!, on the Keystone label. The album consisted of singles by the group, two tracks from 1972 reunion demos, work from Hocko's band, Galactus, and an outtake. The album was poorly circulated, however, and did not receive as much attention as expected. In 2003 Hocko released a compilation album on CD and vinyl LP on the Get Hip label, “Disco Still Sucks!”, with a change in billing which featured the band’s name as “Bob Hocko And The Swamp Rats”. It included all of the band's singles except "Two Tymes Too" and "Mr. Sad", along with more outtakes, and original material by Hocko. In 2007, their song "I'm Going Home" would be sampled by the band Black Lips for their song "Veni Vidi Vici" on their album Good Bad Not Evil.

Don Schreiner died in 1998.

Bob Hocko died on October 16, 2003; he was 54 years old.

Dave Gannon died on October 6, 2014; he was 67 years old.

Dick Newton died on January 9, 2018; he was 69 years old.
