= The JuJus =

American garage rock band

Background information
- Origin: Grand Rapids, Michigan, United States
- Genres: Garage rock; psychedelic rock; folk rock
- Years active: 1964-1967
- Labels: Fenton; United
- Past members: Max Colley Jr. Bill Gorski; Rod Shepard; Ray Hummel III; Brett Wells; Bruce Essex; Ron Homrich; Ronn Burke; Rick Stevens

The JuJus were an American garage rock band formed in Grand Rapids, Michigan, and active between 1964 and 1967. Though the group was never able to record an album they are considered one of the more polished acts to originate from the Michigan rock scene. Amid several line-up changes, The JuJus managed to blend influences of folk rock and The British Invasion into their raw musical style, before experimenting in the psychedelic rock genre. Their most acclaimed piece was the regional hit, "You Treat Me Bad", which is now deemed a garage rock classic.

== History ==
The nucleus of the band originated from Godwin Heights High School, in which all the members were a part of the institute's jazz band. Initially, they formed to parody the act of the Beatles in a school assembly. Their original line-up consisted of saxophone player Max Colley Jr., tuba player turned drummer Bill Gorski, and lead guitarist Rod Shepard. For the performance, Colley, along with classmate, Larry Jansen, penned the original instrumental, "Flake Out", which was heavily influenced by The Surfaris's hit, "Wipe Out". The concert was a success, which resulted in another concert the following night, and hastily arranged compositions by the band. Thereafter, the group received gigs, fashioned themselves in resemblance to the Dave Clark Five, and went under the name, The JuJus.

Realizing saxophone-driven arrangements were not on the forefront of popular music, The JuJus recruited guitarist and vocalist, Ray Hummel III, who originally worked as a folk singer. Shepard shifted to bass guitar thereafter, began rehearsing as a group, and attracted the attention of bondsman, Jim Geeting. Hired as The JuJus' manager, Geeting insisted on the group dressing uniformly, similar as The Beatles did, and it remained the band's trademark for the earlier portion of their career. However, it was the band's high school band instructor, Bob Traitz, who booked The JuJus' gigs, the first of which was in a hospital for the criminally insane. The band performed in a wide variety of venues in Michigan, including "The Ponytail", "The Place", and "The Note", as well as being featured as the house band at "The Elbow Room" in Grand Rapids.

They were also involved in several "Battle of the Bands" contests, alongside regional rivals such as the Soulbenders. The JuJus' typical repertoire consisted of original material Hummel III was working on, cover versions of "Bits and Pieces", "Hang On Sloopy", and "Get Off of My Cloud", and later songs related to British Invasion groups. In the summer of 1965, the band initiated their first recording session at Great Lakes Recording Studio, which was situated in Sparta. Supervised by Dave Kalmbach, the studio equipment was placed to project a heavy drum sound. The resulting tracks, "You Treat Me Bad" and "Hey Little Girl", were both Hummel III originals that were released on a single by Fenton Records. A local DJ by the name of Larry Adderly, fond of the songs' combination of folk rock and saxophone arrangements, promoted the single on WLAV Radio, where it reached number two on the station's Favorite 40 chart in the fall of 1965.

After a performance, in which the group capitalized on the success of Gerry and the Pacemakers, The JuJus recorded two cover versions of their songs, though they would not be released until 2009. In late-1965, the group added guitarist Rick Stevens soon after receiving an award by Adderly for the success of "You Treat Me Bad". It appeared the band was primed to achieve popularity on a national stage when Drummond Records offered a contract to distribute the group's single. However, as a part of their commitment, The JuJus were required to tour nationally. Hummel III, who was about to get married, could not accept the conditions and left the group, followed by Colley. The remaining band members continued with new vocalist Brett Wells and rhythm guitarist, Bruce Essex. With the shuffled line-up, The JuJus released their second single, "I'm Really Sorry", on the United label, but the loss of key musicians and poor promotion prevented the group from repeated success.

In mid-1966, Hummel III reappeared in the short-lived group, Traffic Jam, which produced an obscure single that featured some of Hummel III's former bandmates. All the while, The JuJus underwent several line-up changes. Gorski, one of the two remaining original members, left the group, to be replaced by Ron Homrich. Wells and Essex also departed and Ronn Burke joined as the new vocalist. By early-1967, the band was fashioned as a psychedelic rock act, and Geeting financed a club in Ludington, Michigan called "The Island". The band self-ran the venue, acting as the live attraction for six nights a week, and acquiring nationally successful band's like The Electric Prunes and The Kingsmen. Despite the small market, the club did well; however, Shepard was forced to leave after being drafted in mid-1967, causing the rest of The JuJus to disband.

In 1978, "You Treat Me Bad" was immortalized on the compilation album, Pebbles, Volume 1 and later was the closing track for Teenage Shutdown! You Treated Me Bad!. In 2009, an album, You Treat Me Bad 1965-1967, containing all of the group's previously unreleased material and alternate takes was released, and in the same year The JuJus were inducted into the Michigan Rock and Roll Legends Hall of Fame.
