= Mort Todd =

American writer and media businessman (1961–2025)

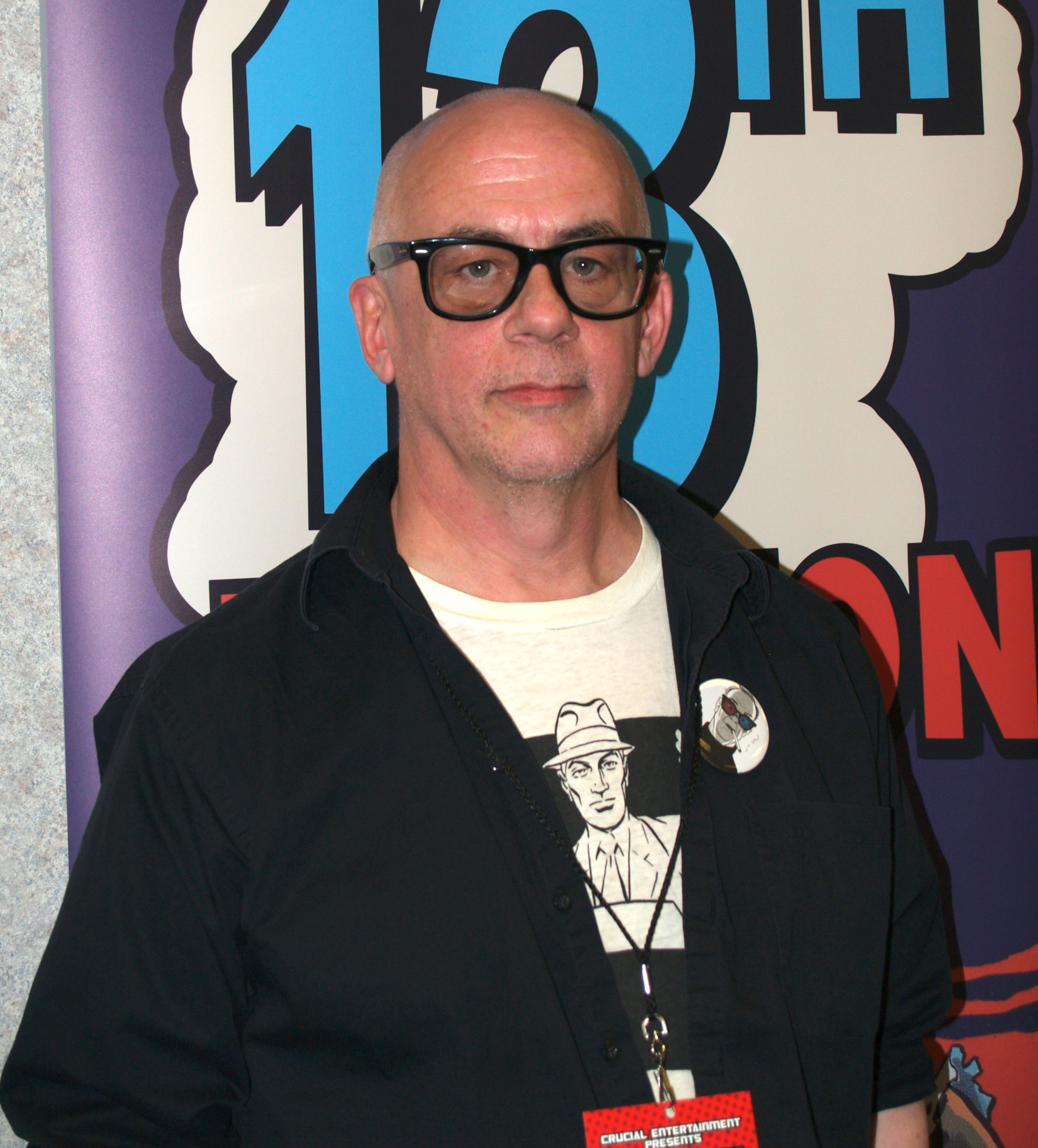
- Todd in 2016
- Born: Michael Jon DelleFemine; November 9, 1961 Maine, U.S.
- Died: August 24, 2025 (aged 63) Portland, Maine, U.S.
- Areas: Writer, penciller, inker, editor, publisher, animator, filmmaker, music producer, actor
- Pseudonyms: E. O'Brain, Eel O'Brian
- Notable works: Cracked; Comicfix; Charlton Neo

Michael Jon DelleFemine (November 9, 1961 – August 24, 2025), known professionally as Mort Todd, was an American writer and media businessman, best known as an editor-in-chief of Cracked magazine, and later, Marvel Music. He was owner of Comicfix, a media company that has developed licensed properties.

As a writer, artist or editor, Todd worked at several comic book companies, contributing to characters including Superman and Spider-Man, and to licensed properties such as Barbie and Looney Tunes. His illustrations appear on CD covers, magazines, newspapers, and print advertisements.

== Life and career ==
=== Early life ===
Todd was born on November 9, 1961, and raised in the state of Maine, where he cultivated a keen interest in all media. As a youth, he started drawing and writing comics, and was editor of his camp newspaper. In high school he drew advertisements and record covers for local clubs and bands and created the Stiv Bators logo still being used for the late Dead Boys' solo career. As a teen, he moved to New York City and began creating Back from the Grave garage punk album covers for Crypt Records. He recreated the first cover for a new album from the Jon Spencer Blues Explosion.

=== Early career ===
With Daniel Clowes, Pete Friedrich and Rick Altergott, Mort Todd contributed stories and art to Psycho Comics. He sold his first screenplay for a TV pilot called The Ultimates to a German production company while still a teenager. The pilot was produced, but never distributed, and stars a young Clowes as a teen rock 'n' roll superhero. Todd also wrote and penciled some stories for Clowes' Lloyd Llewellyn series from Fantagraphics. Around then he started freelancing for DC Comics, Marvel Comics, Kitchen Sink, Myron Fass, and many other smaller publishers.

From 1983 to 1996, he illustrated all nine original volumes of Back from the Grave (Crypt Records), a compilation series of obscure proto-punk rock from the 1960s. The original art to the cover of Volume One is on permanent display at the Cornell University Punk Archive Collection.

In 1985, Todd became editor-in-chief of Cracked magazine. There he signed artist Don Martin after a 32-year career at Mad Magazine. Todd also published some of the earliest mainstream work of Altergott, Clowes, and Peter Bagge.

For Globe Communications, Todd created the comics magazine Monsters Attack!, which featured horror comics and articles about movies. It ran five issues (September 1989 - December 1990), with Todd involved with the first four.

Todd launched the imprint AAA, which published the first authorized collection of Bill Ward's pin-ups in W.O.W. (World of Ward). AAA also published a bilingual humor comic called Pepito with stories by writer George Gladir.

=== Marvel Comics ===
In 1994, Todd launched a line of music comics called Marvel Music at Marvel Comics, working with such artists as Kiss, Rob Zombie, The Rolling Stones, KRS-One, and the estates of Elvis Presley and Bob Marley. Some of the talent working on these books included Neil Gaiman, Kyle Baker, Dan Barry, Severin, Colan, and Morrow.

While at Marvel, Todd also edited a series of pre-Comics Code horror and giant monster reprints (Curse of the Weird and Monster Menace), and developed the oversized Comic Book by Ren & Stimpy-creator John Kricfalusi.

In 2005, Todd rejoined Cracked magazine, this time as a contributing editor, but left after several months.

Todd wrote and illustrated for the new Tales from the Crypt comic series, and completed new comic books featuring "Lucy Hell, Devilgirl", "The Secret Society", and the French/English language "Mr. Krime", the last written by Martyrs of Pop's Jean-Emmanuel Dubois. With his longtime collaborator Cliff Mott, Todd created and directed three animated cartoons for Playboy.

=== Film and television ===
Todd has storyboarded commercials and produced animation for Walt Disney, Sesame Street, CBS, MTV, and Comcast, including an animated television pilot featuring Christopher Walken.

Todd was assistant director on the live-action film Distraction, and directed his first live-action short, a gangster comedy called A Change of Heart. He was producer of The Diabolikal Super-Kriminal documentary, which had its world premiere in Italy at the Ravenna Nightmare Film Festival in November 2007, and its U.S. premiere at San Diego Comic-Con in July 2009. The film was awarded a Special Mention at the convention and in November 2011, won the "Golden Lobster" Director's Award at the Portland Maine Film Festival. He has directed music videos for cartoonist Peter Bagge's Seattle band Can You Imagine?, the psychobilly band Psycho Charger, the Spanish Help Me Devil as well as an animated tease for his animated Sadistik: Strip & Kill web series. He also provided some animation for the documentary Arias with a Twist, directed by Bobby Sheehan.

=== Comicfix and Station A ===
The first work from Todd’s media company, Comicfix, was a trio of comic strips appearing in the New York Post, starting in 2000: Speed Racer, written and drawn by Mort; Celebrity Biografix by Mort and John Severin; and an interactive soap opera comic, Molly the Model by Mort, Cliff Mott and Pat Redding. His illustrations appear on CD covers, magazines, newspapers and print advertisements.

Other work includes a comic booklet in the Wilmer Valderrama DVD, The Dead One (a.k.a. El Muerto); a CD cover for Jon Spencer Blues Explosion and the European tour poster and videos for his band with Matt Verta-Ray, Heavy Trash. Comicfix also published the three issue run of Holy Terror by Jason Caskey & Phil Hester that was started at Image Comics but was never completed there.

In late 2011, Todd started Station A, a media company in Portland, Maine, that creates print advertising and comics, as well as a live action TV commercial he directed for Nosh Kitchen Bar that stirred a local controversy for its depiction of vegans.

In July 2012, Todd launched a weekly humor magazine, Vex.

On April 1, 2013, Todd perpetrated a hoax with the supposed discovery of a trove of 1950s horror comics from the fictitious Zeus Comics. The following day he announced it as a hoax to promote a publishing project.

Beginning in 2014, Comicfix began publishing The Charlton Arrow. As more and more creators got involved, including some original Charlton Comics veterans, the publication became a color comic and moved to the Charlton Neo imprint where Mort became publisher and editor-in-chief.

=== ACE Comics ===
In 2013, Todd relaunched ACE Comics with publisher Ron Frantz, who had published the line in the 1980s. Todd had contributed to ACE in 1987, collaborating on the comic Return of the Skyman with legendary illustrator Steve Ditko.

The first new ACE Comics release was The Return of the Original Skyman Pencil Portfolio, advertised as a 25th Anniversary Collectors’ Edition. It is unique in that the original pencil pages of artist Steve Ditko are printed next to the finished ink pages embellished by Rick Altergott.

The second title was Kill the Face!, reprinting the revival of the Golden Age of Comic Books character The Face, which Frantz released in the 1980s, with story by Joe Gill and art by Ditko with a cover by Alex Toth. As well as editing the book, Todd colored the collected issues, having been originally published in black and white.

Another series being released by ACE is Classic Hot Rods and Racing Car Comics, a reprint series collecting the original Charlton Comics series, written and drawn by Jack Keller.

=== Death ===
Todd died at his home in Portland, Maine, on August 24, 2025, at the age of 63.

== Bibliography ==
- (as Michael Delle-Femine) Monster Party (Cracked digest, volume 2) (Globe Communications, 1987)
- The Joker's Joke Book (Tom Doherty Associates, 1988) ISBN 0-8125-7125-8
- Woodstock, 1969-1994 (Marvel Music, 1994) ISBN 0-7851-0075-X — written with Charles Schneider, illustrated by Pat Redding
- Over 100 Traits of Truly Horrible People: How to Be a Better Person, (Radius Press, 2000) ISBN 0-942154-44-4
