= Crypt Records =

Independent record label

- Founded: 1983
- Founder: Tim Warren
- Genre: garage rock
- Country of origin: Germany
- Location: Morristown, NJ; Hamburg
- Official website: cryptrecords.com

Crypt Records is an independent record label founded by American-born Tim Warren in 1983. The label has been headquartered variously in Hamburg, Germany and in several locations in the United States. Crypt is perhaps best known for issuing the ten-volume Back from the Grave series of 1960s garage punk compilations, although its other reissues and releases include surf, rockabilly, punk rock, exotica, garage punk, original rhythm and blues, and soul music.

== History ==
=== Establishment ===
Crypt Records was launched in August 1983 by the New York-born Tim Warren (b. 1960), who had spent his boyhood with his family in the Philippines and Greece. The family moved back to the United States in 1974, when Warren was 14.

Warren spent his first four years as a young adult working in a record store in Amherst, Massachusetts before moving to Maine to work in a gas station — a job which allowed him to save a modest amount of money. In October 1980 Warren returned to his New York City birthplace to take a job in another record store. It was at this time that Warren first became interested in garage punk and other underground music of the 1960s.

The label's first release was Back from the Grave, a compilation LP dedicated to raw 1960s garage rock. Over the next three years there would be a total of 17 releases, focusing on rare 1960s garage and 1950s rockabilly music.

In the fall of 1986 the label moved towards the reissue of contemporary punk rock with a reissue of 1970s band DMZ. A mix of releases followed including pioneering bands from the 1950s and 1960s as well as modern punk groups.

=== Move to Germany ===
Warren moved to Hamburg, Germany in January 1990, where he immediately began booking European tours for various bands on the Crypt label. The label rented a seven-room space in the spring of 1991, in which it opened up a retail record store in addition to continuing its manufacturing operations.

Although home to the commercially successful New Bomb Turks, the label found itself in financial difficulties owing to slow payments from dishonest distributors. With punk exploding in popularity in the United States, plans were made for a resumption of manufacturing operations there. Still hampered by cash flow problems resulting from distributor non-payment, a manufacturing and distribution deal was signed with major label-affiliated Matador Records in August 1994.

In 1997 the building housing Crypt Records was sold to a new owner, leading to an escalation in rent which forced the shop's closure.

=== 21st century ===
In January 1999 Warren decided to return to the United States, briefly settling in the small town of Truckee, California. He moved across country in June 2000 to Frenchtown, New Jersey, bringing his label in tow. A Crypt presence was maintained in Germany, with a new shop opened at an alternate location in Hamburg in September 2005.

The label remained in financial difficulties, hindered in particular by the bankruptcy of Crypt's European distributor. Warren was unhappy in the United States and found himself spending an inordinate amount on the repair and maintenance of a New Jersey home he had purchased. He managed to sell the house in 2007 and returned to New York, briefly opening a record store in Brooklyn called "Cool and Crazy."

This New York chapter also proved to be a short one and a return was made to Germany, this time to Berlin. The label continues in existence in 2015 and is best known for its series of Back from the Grave compilation albums.

== Artists ==
- Los Ass-Draggers
- Atomic Suplex
- Bantam Rooster
- The Beguiled
- Cheater Slicks
- Country Teasers
- The Devil Dogs
- The Dirtys
- Fireworks
- The Gories
- The Grave Diggers
- Guitar Wolf
- Thee Headcoats
- Jon Spencer Blues Explosion
- The Lazy Cowgirls
- The Little Killers
- Lyres
- Thee Mighty Caesars
- Ralph Nielsen & The Chancellors
- New Bomb Turks
- Nine Pound Hammer
- Oblivians
- The Pagans
- Piece Kor
- The Pleasure Fuckers
- The Raunch Hands
- The Revelators
- Teengenerate
- Wylde Mammoths

== See also ==
- List of record labels
