= FeardotCom =

2002 film directed by William Malone

- Theatrical release poster
- Directed by: William Malone
- Screenplay by: Josephine Coyle
- Story by: Moshe Diamant
- Produced by: Limor Diamant; Moshe Diamant
- Starring: Stephen Dorff; Natascha McElhone; Stephen Rea
- Cinematography: Christian Sebaldt
- Edited by: Alan Strachan
- Music by: Nicholas Pike
- Production companies: Franchise Pictures; MDP Worldwide
- Distributed by: Warner Bros. Pictures (North America); Columbia TriStar (select territories)
- Release dates: August 30, 2002 (U.S.); June 27, 2003 (U.K.)
- Running time: 101 minutes
- Countries: United States; United Kingdom; Germany; Luxembourg
- Language: English
- Budget: $40 million
- Box office: $18.9 million

FeardotCom is a 2002 supernatural horror film directed by William Malone, and starring Stephen Dorff, Natascha McElhone, and Stephen Rea. The plot details a New York City detective investigating a series of mysterious deaths connected to a disturbing website. Udo Kier, Jeffrey Combs, Nigel Terry, and Michael Sarrazin also appear in the film in supporting roles.

The film was director Malone's second feature for Warner Bros. Pictures after the commercially successful House on Haunted Hill (1999), and was an international co-production among companies based in the United States, Luxembourg, Germany, and the United Kingdom. Principal photography took place on location in Luxembourg and Montreal, Canada.

FeardotCom was released in the United States on August 30, 2002. FeardotCom was overwhelmingly panned by critics and was a box-office bomb. FeardotCom was also one of 22 films to receive an 'F' rating from audiences polled at CinemaScore. It grossed $18.9 million worldwide against its $40 million budget.

Despite its unfavorable critical reception at the time of its release, the film has accrued a small cult following in the ensuing years. It has been noted by some film scholars for its postmodern themes surrounding the internet and media consumption, with some critics comparing it to films such as Videodrome (1983).

== Plot ==
Mike Reilly is an NYPD detective who is called to the scene of a mysterious death in the subway system. The victim, Polidori, exhibits bleeding from his eyes and other orifices and, by the frozen look on his face, appears to have seen something horrifying before being hit by a train. Health Department researcher Terry Huston is intrigued by the find as well, particularly when several more victims show up with identical symptoms.

When a contagious virus is ruled out, Terry and Mike team up to discover what might be killing these people. Initially they are unable to find anything to connect the deaths; after some more digging for clues, they eventually discover that all of the victims' computers crashed shortly before their passings. They send each of the victims' hard drives to Mike's friend, Denise Stone, a forensic specialist, for analysis. Denise discovers that all of the victims had visited an interactive website called 'Feardotcom', which depicts voyeuristic torture murder. Upon viewing the site herself, Denise is subjected to various sights and sounds of torture that eventually drive her insane, resulting in her falling to her death from her apartment window.

Mike feels guilty, thinking that he should have never gotten Denise involved in the case. Terry figures out that people who visit the website die within 48 hours, apparently from what they feared most in their lives. Despite such dangerous knowledge, both she and Mike visit the site in order to figure out what is happening. As they begin to experience paranoia and hallucinations, including that of a young girl and her inflatable ball, they race against time to figure out if any of it has any connection to an extremely vicious serial killer, Alistair Pratt, who has been eluding Mike and the FBI for years.

It is revealed that Feardotcom is, in fact, a ghost site powered by the vengeful spirit of one of Pratt's first victims, Jeannie Richardson, seeking revenge for her own exploitation as a subject of one of Pratt's snuff films which was shared on the internet. Jeannie was tortured by Pratt for 48 hours before she begged him to kill her, which explains why the victims have 48 hours to live. Following a clue, Terry locates Jeannie's mutilated corpse in the bowels of a flooded steel mill where she once played as a child. Terry assumes that the recovery of Jeannie's body will put her soul at rest.

Mike and Terry track down Pratt to his torture chamber in a building basement, where he is preparing to kill another victim. Mike shoots Pratt in the leg, but Pratt returns fire, shooting Mike in the abdomen. Pratt incapacitates Terry and attempts to kill her before a dying Mike manages to use Pratt's computer to log onto the website, releasing Jeannie's spirit. Along with the ghosts of other victims, Jeannie descends upon Pratt, killing him. Moments later, Mike also dies.

Some time later, while lying in bed with her pet cat, Terry's phone rings. Upon picking up the receiver, she hears only online static.

== Cast ==
- Stephen Dorff as Detective Mike Reilly
- Natascha McElhone as Terry Huston
- Stephen Rea as Alistair Pratt
- Udo Kier as L. Polidori
- Amelia Curtis as Denise Stone
- Jeffrey Combs as Detective Sykes
- Nigel Terry as Eddie Turnbull
- Gesine Cukrowski as Jeannie Richardson
- Michael Sarrazin as Frank Bryant
- Anna Thalbach as Kate
- Siobhan Flynn as Thana Brinkman
- Joan McBride as Mrs. Richardson
- Elizabeth McKechnie as Alice Turnbull
- Isabelle van Waes as Karen, Pratt's victim
- Arnita Swanson as Barlow
- Gordon Peters as Rooney
- Nils Brunkhorst as Prisoner
- Sven Pippig as Henry
- Anja Van Greuningen as Ashley
- Anjelika Khromova as Ashley's Mother
- Matthias Schweighöfer as Dieter Schrader
- Birthe Wolter as Nina Blank

== Themes ==
In the book American Horror Film: The Genre at the Turn of the Millennium (2010), film scholar Reynold Humphries associates FeardotCom as a progenitor of torture-themed films such as Saw (2004) and Hostel (2005), which grew in popularity following the September 11 attacks. Humphries also notes that the film contains themes regarding contemporary media consumption and disinformation, writing that it "condenses both the self-referentiality of modernism and the post-modern conceit that, in this image-saturated world of game playing, it has become impossible to decide where the truth lies, or even whether the images can any longer represent the truth." Humphries compares the film's use of computer technology to that of the television in David Cronenberg's Videodrome (1983), noting that both films exist in an "unsettling dimension of confusion."

Critic Scott Foundas suggested the film was influenced by the East Asian horror films Pulse and Visible Secret (both 2001). The visual motif of a ghostly white girl playing with a ball was inspired by Mario Bava's Kill, Baby, Kill (1966).

== Production ==
=== Development ===
Producer Moshe Diamant originally hired Josephine Coyle to write a screenplay revolving around a woman who uses her sexuality and the internet to lure victims and was originally an erotic horror film intended for Zalman King who specialized in erotic films. As Coyle did research, she came across the idea that energy cannot be created or destroyed and thought the idea of the internet being used as a conduit for the energy of a murdered woman seeking revenge on her killer was an interest route to take the concept. Malone liked Coyle's script and credited her for the initial hook, but Malone performed some uncredited re-writes particularly regarding the ending as well as the inclusion of hallucination sequences.

Malone stated that his goal when agreeing to direct was to make the entire film look "basically like a nightmare."

=== Casting ===
Stephen Dorff was cast as the lead in the film, while Stephen Rea was cast as the villain based on Malone's appreciation of him as one of his "favorite actors." Natascha McElhone was cast as the lead female role, and Malone stated in retrospect that he felt she had been miscast: "I mean, I love[d] having her in the film, don't get me wrong, but the film should have been rewritten for her, instead of being written for somebody who was showing off how good she is at her job. Natascha has this sort of competence and elegance, so you just don't buy that with her." Jeffrey Combs, who had appeared in Malone's previous feature, House on Haunted Hill, was cast in a supporting part as a detective.

=== Filming ===
Though set in New York City, the film was shot in Montreal, Canada, and in Luxembourg. Director William Malone had not intended to shoot the film in Luxembourg, but stated that the producers had scouted locations there which they believed "looked like" New York; as a result, Malone said the film ended up being a "weird take on New York rather than being New York." Some scenes, such as those in the subway stations, were shot on constructed sets built on sound stages. Malone stated in an audio commentary that the majority of the interiors scenes were also shot on sets.

The website featured in the film was designed by a Berlin-based digital design company.

== Release ==
The film was released on August 30, 2002, in the United States and Canada. It would receive subsequent theatrical releases in numerous countries throughout the ensuing months, debuting in the United Kingdom and Ireland on June 27, 2003.

=== Rating ===
The film was originally rated NC-17 in the United States due to extreme violence. After multiple trims and appeals, the film was finally re-rated R by the MPAA for "violence including grisly images of torture, nudity and language".

=== Home media ===
Feardotcom was released on VHS and DVD by Warner Home Video on January 14, 2003. In October 2024, Dark Star Pictures released the film on Blu-ray for the first time, first made available through the Vinegar Syndrome online store, with a general street date of November 26, 2024.

== Reception ==
=== Box office ===
The film opened at number 5 at the US box office behind Signs, My Big Fat Greek Wedding, XXX, and Spy Kids 2: The Island of Lost Dreams, grossing $5.7 million its opening weekend showing on 2,550 screens. It earned an additional $2.3 million the following weekend (September 6–8), and $982,450 the subsequent weekend (September 13–15). The film screened in US theaters until Halloween, though by the weekend of October 25, the number of screens it was showing on had reduced to 92 in total.

The film's total domestic gross was $13.3 million, and $5.6 international, totaling $18.9 million worldwide.

=== Critical response ===
On the review aggregator website Rotten Tomatoes, 3% of 99 critics' reviews are positive, with an average rating of 2.9/10. The website's consensus reads: "As frustrating as a 404 error, Fear Dot Com is a stylish, incoherent, and often nasty mess with few scares." Metacritic, which uses a weighted average, assigned the film a score of 16 out of 100, based on 20 critics, indicating "overwhelming dislike". Audiences polled by CinemaScore gave the film a rare "F" grade on an A+ to F scale.

A number of film critics compared the premise of FeardotCom to the Japanese film Ring, a remake of which was released shortly after FeardotCom. Both Mark Kermode of The Observer and Cynthia Fuchs of PopMatters wrote of the premise's similarity to Ring as well as David Cronenberg's Videodrome. Empire magazine gave the film one out of five stars, calling it "arguably the least imaginative, most pathetic horror of the decade." The Guardian called it a "nasty, badly acted horror film [...] like Marc Evans' My Little Eye or Olivier Assayas' execrable Demonlover, it manages to be both prurient and very, very naive about the internet."

Roger Ebert gave the film a mixed review, rating two out of four stars and noting, "strange, how good FeardotCom is, and how bad. The screenplay is a mess, and yet the visuals are so creative this is one of the rare bad films you might actually want to see" and praising the last 20 minutes as something which, if it "had been produced by a German impressionist in the 1920s, we'd be calling it a masterpiece." He added, "The movie is extremely violent; it avoided the NC-17 rating and earned an R, I understand, after multiple trims and appeals, and even now it is one of the most graphic horror films I've seen."

Jami Bernard of The New York Daily News said, "The story is a mess, some of the images offensive, the acting under par and the dialogue silly." Claudia Puig of USA Today said, "Feardotcom is the cinematic equivalent of spam in your e-mail inbox." Furthermore, Mick LaSalle of the San Francisco Chronicle said, "What we get in FearDotCom is more like something from a bad Clive Barker movie. In other words, it's badder than bad," while Stephen Holden of The New York Times said that it "is so rambling and disconnected it never builds any suspense."

Writing for The Globe and Mail, Liam Lacey wrote of the film's potential for cult status, adding: "but the movie's progression into rambling incoherence gives new meaning to the phrase 'fatal script error.'" Andrew Manning of Radio Free Entertainment stated, "Of all the trash I had to watch in 2002, the insipid FearDotCom easily ranks among the worst," and Oz of eFilmCritic.com stated: "In a year that has given us some of the worst films of all time, this must surely rank as the worst -- and that's a hard thing to do opposite Master of Disguise."

In his book The Cinema Dreams Its Rivals: Media Fantasy Films from Radio to the Internet, film scholar Paul Young praised the film's dark cinematography, writing:

FearDotCom refuses to let CG penetrate its mise-en-scène... FearDotCom is set in New York, but instead of providing digitized skylines and enhanced locales to fudge the differences, FearDotCom simply plunges the city into the dark... In effect, [it] manages to incarnate a sense of what film "was" before CG, a sense it underscores by building its Monogram B-film environment around the Internet.

=== Accolades ===
FeardotCom won "Worst Film" at the 2003 Dallas-Fort Worth Film Critics Association Awards and 'Grand Prize of European Fantasy Film in Silver' at 2003 Fantafestival. It was nominated for "Grand Prize of European Fantasy Film in Gold" at the 2004 Amsterdam Fantastic Film Festival and 'Best Film' at the 2002 Sitges - Catalan International Film Festival.

== See also ==
- List of ghost films

== Sources ==
- Duchaney, Brian N. (2015). The Spark of Fear: Technology, Society and the Horror Film. Jefferson, North Carolina: McFarland. ISBN 978-0-786-49511-5.
- Humphries, Reynold (2010). "A (Post)Modern House of Pain: FearDotCom and the Prehistory of the Post-9/11 Torture Film". American Horror Film: The Genre at the Turn of the Millennium. Jackson, Mississippi: Univ. Press of Mississippi. pp. 58–74. ISBN 978-1-604-73454-6.
- Kane, Paul; O'Regan, Marie (2010). Voices in the Dark: Interviews with Horror Writers, Directors and Actors. McFarland. ISBN 978-0-786-45672-7. OCLC 663459142.
- Malone, William; Sebaldt, Christian (2003). FeardotCom (Audio commentary (DVD)). Warner Bros.
- Meikle, Dennis (2005). The Ring Companion. London, England: Titan Books. ISBN 978-1-845-76001-4. OCLC 803242399.
- Young, Paul (2006). The Cinema Dreams Its Rivals: Media Fantasy Films from Radio to the Internet. Minneapolis, Minnesota: University of Minnesota Press. ISBN 978-0-816-63599-3. OCLC 928699699.
