= Parasomnia (film) =

- Promotional poster
- Directed by: William Malone
- Written by: William Malone
- Produced by: Jane Hamilton
- Starring: Dylan Purcell; Jeffrey Combs; Timothy Bottoms; Sean Young
- Cinematography: Enzo Giobbe; Christian Sebaldt
- Edited by: Anthony Adler
- Music by: Nicholas Pike
- Production companies: Luminous Processes; Rising Storm Productions
- Distributed by: Rising Storm Productions
- Release dates: October 17, 2008 (Screamfest); July 13, 2010 (United States)
- Running time: 103 minutes
- Country: United States
- Language: English

Parasomnia is a 2008 American supernatural horror film written and directed by William Malone and starring Jeffrey Combs, Timothy Bottoms, Sean Young, and Dylan Purcell. Its plot follows a young woman suffering from a rare sleep disorder that causes her to sleep her life away. The film was funded by Malone himself, and its release was delayed due to difficulties securing distribution.

== Plot ==
Danny Sloan is an art student who works in a record shop. He visits his friend Billy, who is in drug rehab in hospital. Billy suggests Danny goes to see the "psycho ward" before he leaves, to see Byron Volpe, a serial killer kept in a padded cell after being convicted of murdering his wife Madeline by hypnotizing her into jumping from a building. Volpe is explained to have extraordinary powers of hypnotism, and is kept restrained and hooded to stop hospital staff from seeing his eyes. During the visit, Danny sees Laura Baxter sleeping in the room next to Volpe. She suffers from a form of parasomnia in which she sleeps most of the time, and wakes occasionally for short periods of time.

Danny falls in love with Laura, and continues to visit her at the hospital. When he finds out that she is due to move to a clinic run by Dr. Bhyle where she will be used for medical experimentation, he resolves to rescue her. Disguised as a doctor from the Bhyle clinic, he kidnaps her and takes her to his apartment. The following morning Danny discovers that a neighbor has been murdered, and Laura attacks him with a knife while seemingly in a trance. When Detective Conroy, investigating the neighbor's death, comes to Danny's apartment, Laura kills him. Danny decides that Volpe must be controlling her, and decides that he must kill Volpe to stop him. He buys a handgun and visits the hospital, but Volpe overpowers him, escapes and takes Laura. Danny visits Volpe's derelict book shop, where Detective Garrett finds him. After Volpe speaks to Garrett on the phone, he too falls under Volpe's control and takes Danny to Volpe. Volpe then sets Garrett to repeatedly playing Russian roulette.

Volpe explains to Danny that rather than just kill him, he must make Laura forget about Danny so that she will love only Volpe. Volpe hypnotizes Danny into denouncing his love for Laura, but the sound of a gunshot made by Garrett shooting himself breaks the spell, and Danny and Laura fight and finally defeat Volpe. Garrett, who was only wounded by the gunshot, then shoots Danny in the side of the head, rendering him comatose. The film ends with Danny and Laura being cared for together by Dr. Corso back at the hospital.

== Cast ==
- Dylan Purcell as Danny Sloan
- Cherilyn Wilson as Laura Baxter
- Patrick Kilpatrick as Byron Volpe
- Sean Young as Madeline Volpe
- Timothy Bottoms as Dr. Emil Corso
- Dov Tiefenbach as Billy Dornboss
- Jeffrey Combs as Detective Garrett
- Jeff Doucette as Detective Conroy
- Kathryn Leigh Scott as Nurse Margaret Evans
- Janet Tracy Keijser as Sara
- Katherine Carlsberg as Miranda
- Alison Brie as Darcy

== Production ==
Malone wrote the screenplay while he was working on the Masters of Horror episode "Fair-Haired Child". The film was financed by Malone and his friends, and filmed on the same stage on which he directed House on Haunted Hill (1999).

The imagery in the film was inspired by surrealist artist Zdzisław Beksiński, as well as the horror film The Cabinet of Dr. Caligari (1920).

== Release ==
Parasomnia premiered on October 17, 2008 at Screamfest Horror Film Festival in Los Angeles. E1 Entertainment released the film on DVD and Blu-ray on July 13, 2010.
