= Laura Baxter =

Laura Baxter may refer to:

- Laura Baxter, character in Flight 7500
- Laura Baxter, Miss Teenage America
- Laura Baxter, character in Parasomnia (film)
- Laura Baxter, character in Another World, see List of Another World cast members
- Laura Baxter, character in Don't Look Now
