= House on Haunted Hill =

1959 horror film directed by William Castle

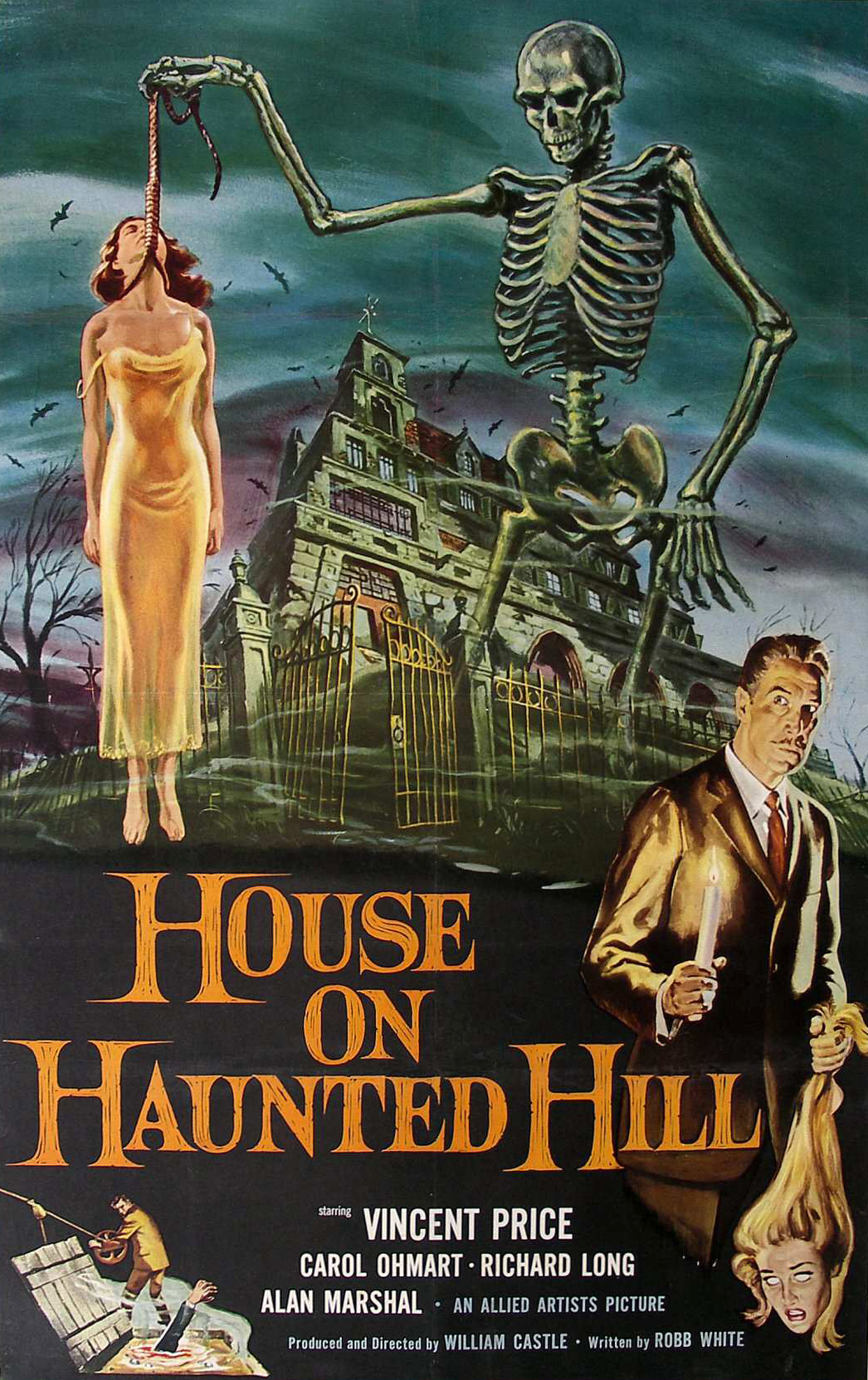
- Theatrical release poster by Reynold Brown
- Directed by: William Castle
- Written by: Robb White
- Produced by: William Castle
- Starring: Vincent Price; Carol Ohmart; Richard Long; Alan Marshal
- Cinematography: Carl E. Guthrie
- Edited by: Roy Livingston
- Music by: Von Dexter
- Production company: William Castle Productions
- Distributed by: Allied Artists
- Release date: December 17, 1958
- Running time: 75 minutes
- Country: United States
- Language: English
- Budget: $150,000–$200,000
- Box office: $3 million

House on Haunted Hill is a 1958 (Note: Though sometimes classified as a 1959 film, House on Haunted Hill was released theatrically in late 1958.) American horror film produced and directed by William Castle, written by Robb White and starring Vincent Price, Carol Ohmart, Richard Long, Alan Marshal, Carolyn Craig, Julie Mitchum, and Elisha Cook Jr. Price plays an eccentric millionaire, Frederick Loren, who, along with his wife Annabelle, has invited five people to the house for a "haunted house" party. Whoever stays in the house for one night will earn $10,000. As the night progresses, the guests are trapped within the house with an assortment of terrors.

House on Haunted Hill was first released in a limited number of cities on December 17, 1958, before premiering in San Francisco on January 14, 1959. In February, 1959, it played on a double bill with The Cosmic Man (1959). This film is famous for employing one of Castle's promotional gimmicks, "Emergo," a skeleton that was flown over the audience during screenings to frighten patrons.

In the years since its release, the film has developed a cult following and was remade in 1999.

== Plot ==
Millionaire Frederick Loren invites five people to a party he is throwing for his fourth wife, Annabelle, in an allegedly haunted house he has rented. He promises to give each guest $10,000 with the stipulation that they stay the entire night in the house after the doors are locked at midnight. All the windows are barred, there is no electricity and no phones or radios to use. The guests are test pilot Lance Schroeder; newspaper columnist Ruth Bridges; psychiatrist Dr. David Trent; Nora Manning, who works for one of Loren's companies; and the house's owner, Watson Pritchard. All are strangers to both the Lorens and each other.

The Lorens have a tense relationship. Frederick is convinced that Annabelle tried to poison him to acquire his wealth, which Annabelle denies, attributing his suspicions to paranoia and jealousy. Watson believes that the house is genuinely haunted by the ghosts of those murdered there, including his own brother; he claims to have spent one night there before and "was almost dead" when found the next morning. He gives a tour of the house, including a vat of acid in the basement, which a previous resident used to kill his wife. When Lance and Nora remain behind to further explore the basement, Lance is locked in an empty room and struck on the head, while an apparent ghost confronts Nora.

Annabelle privately warns Lance that her husband is scheming something and that she suspects him of murdering his second and third wives after his first wife disappeared. The guests learn the party's rules downstairs, and each is given a gun for protection. Having encountered further apparitions, Nora decides against staying the night, but the caretakers lock the doors five minutes early, taking that option out of the guests' hands.

Hearing a scream, Lance and David find Annabelle's corpse, suspended to suggest that she had hanged herself. However, the absence of a perch immediately arouses suspicions of murder. Nora confronts Lance and tells him that an unseen assailant strangled her and left her for dead. In light of Annabelle's warnings, they both suspect Frederick. He tells her to remain out of sight so that her attacker will still think that she is dead. Lance and David propose that everyone stay in their rooms and shoot anyone who enters to survive the night. Thus the innocents will have no reason to leave their rooms and the killer must stay put or admit guilt.

Nora is chased from her room into the basement by Annabelle's ghost. Aroused by the ghostly sounds, David concludes that the killer is about and proposes that he and Frederick split up to search the house. Lance uncovers a secret room at the end of the second-floor hall, but the door shuts behind him once he enters, trapping him. David instead meets with Annabelle, who faked her death using a hanging harness and sedatives. Secretly lovers, the two of them have orchestrated the various mishaps to manipulate Nora into killing Frederick. Nora, seeing Frederick enter the basement with a gun in his hand, shoots him. After she flees, David slips in to dispose of Frederick's body in the vat of acid, and the lights go out.

Annabelle walks to the basement to confirm that her husband is dead. A skeleton rises from the acid, accuses her in Frederick's voice, and shoves her into the vat. Frederick emerges from the shadows, holding the puppeteer control unit that he used to manipulate the skeleton and revealing that he had known their plot all along.

After Nora, Watson, and Ruth release Lance from the secret room, Nora admits that she shot Frederick. When they arrive in the cellar, Frederick explains that he loaded her gun with blanks, that his wife and David plotted to kill him, and that they both died in the vat of acid. He says that he is ready for justice to decide if he is innocent or guilty. Watson remains convinced that the house is haunted, with David and Annabelle now added to its ranks of ghosts, and that he will be the next victim.

== Cast ==
- Vincent Price as Frederick Loren
- Carol Ohmart as Annabelle Loren
- Richard Long as Lance Schroeder
- Alan Marshal as Dr. David Trent
- Carolyn Craig as Nora Manning
- Elisha Cook Jr. as Watson Pritchard (credited as Elisha Cook)
- Julie Mitchum as Ruth Bridgers
- Leona Anderson as Mrs. Slydes
- Howard Hoffman as Jonas Slydes

== Production ==
=== Casting ===
In July 1958, Vincent Price was in talks with director William Castle to star in the film, and his casting was officially announced in August 1958. Carol Ohmart's casting was announced the following month. The film marked Ohmart's first major screen role in several years, following her publicized divorce from actor Wayde Preston.

=== Filming ===
Principal photography of House on Haunted Hill took place in the late summer of 1958. Exterior shots of the house were filmed at the historic Ennis House in Los Feliz, California, designed by Frank Lloyd Wright and built in 1924. The bulk of the film was shot on sound stages, depicting the interior of the house in a combination of styles, including 1890s Victorian, with gas chandeliers and sconces. The poster for the film included an illustration of a house in yet a third style, that of a fanciful four-story Romanesque structure. Several art pieces owned by Vincent Price were used as set decoration in the film.

The theatrical trailer promoted the film as The House on Haunted Hill, although all advertising material and the title on the film itself were simply titled House on Haunted Hill.

== Release ==
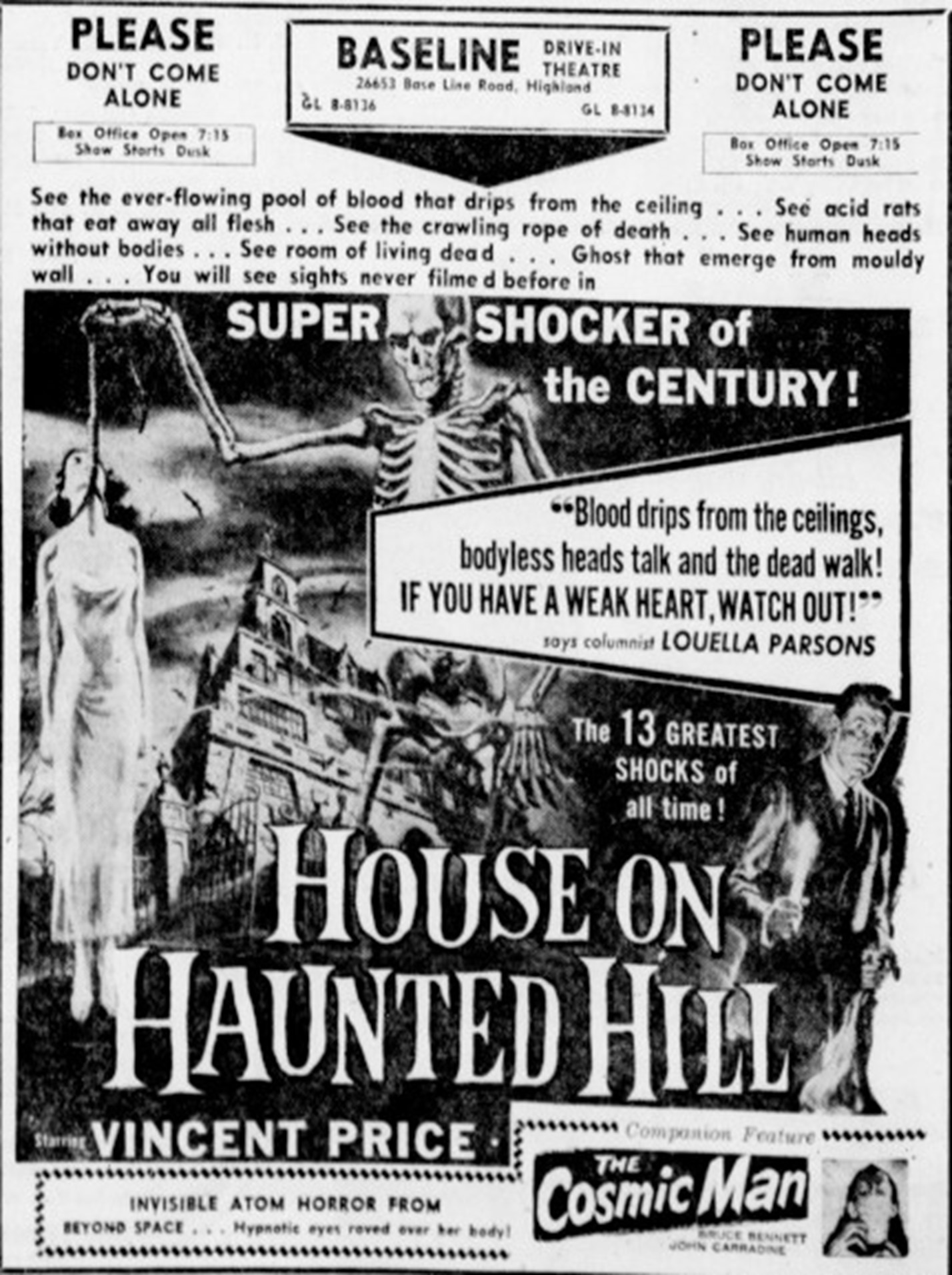
Drive-in advertisement from 1959 for House on Haunted Hill and co-feature, The Cosmic Man.

House on Haunted Hill was originally released theatrically by Allied Artists. It had a limited release in Riverside, California and Hoopeston, Illinois on December 17, 1958. It opened in San Francisco at the Golden Gate Theatre on January 14, 1959.

=== "Emergo" gimmick ===
House on Haunted Hill is known for a promotional gimmick used in the film's original theatrical release called "Emergo". In some theaters that showed the film, exhibitors rigged an elaborate pulley system near the theater screen which allowed a plastic prop skeleton to be flown over the audience during a corresponding scene late in the film.

Thanks in part to Castle's gimmickry, the film was a huge success. Alfred Hitchcock took notice of the low-budget film's performance at the box office and made his own low-budget horror film, which became the critically acclaimed hit Psycho (1960). Castle was himself a Hitchcock fan and imitated Hitchcock's work in later films such as Homicidal (1961).

=== Home media ===
Lorimar Productions released the film on VHS cassette on CBS/Fox Video's Key Video in October 1985. Two major studios have released it on home video in remastered versions. Warner Home Video released the film on DVD as a tie-in to the release of the 1999 remake. In 2005, the film was colorized by Legend Films. The color version was released on DVD the same year by 20th Century Fox. Extras prepared by Legend Films for the Fox DVD release included an audio commentary track by comedian Michael J. Nelson of Mystery Science Theater 3000, two versions of the trailer, and a slideshow of images from the film's original press book.

Johnny Legend released a 50th anniversary DVD containing many extras such as both the original theatrical trailer and TV spots plus several William Castle and Vincent Price theatrical trailers, a Carol Ohmart profile and "golden age" TV shows starring Vincent Price. A DivX file of the colorized version with the commentary embedded is available as part of Nelson's RiffTrax On Demand service. In 2009, a newly recorded commentary by Nelson, Kevin Murphy and Bill Corbett was released by RiffTrax. The RiffTrax team performed a Live RiffTrax of House on Haunted Hill on 28 October 2010.

House on Haunted Hill was released in a restored Blu-ray edition as part of Shout! Factory's 2014 Vincent Price Collection II. Film Masters released a limited edition Blu-ray on December 16, 2025.

== Reception ==
=== Box office ===
House on Haunted Hill was a financial success, having grossed $3 million in the United States by July 1959.

=== Critical response ===
Numerous critics praised House on Haunted Hill for its classical style, likening it to old-fashioned haunted house films. (Note: Attritbuted to multiple critical reviews.) Paine Knickerbocker of the San Francisco Chronicle wrote that the film's "Emergo" gimmick was "not an important element of the picture," adding: "The film is far better than one might suspect from its title, and yet it actually pretends to be no more: it is merely an old-fashioned mystery suspense film and a pretty good one." The Oregonian similarly compared the film favorably to classic horror films such as The Bat (1926) and The Cat and the Canary (1927), heralding it as a "ghost story of the highest excellence" and "pure entertainment from the first reel forward." Jean Walrath of the Democrat and Chronicle similarly praised the film's "classic approach" and commended the performances by Price, Carol Ohmart, and Alan Marshal.

Kate Cameron of the New York Daily News awarded the film two and a half out of four stars, praising Price's performance. Howard Thompson of The New York Times alternately panned the film, deeming it "a stale spook concoction."

On the review aggregator website Rotten Tomatoes, 80% of 44 critics' reviews are positive, with an average rating of 7.2/10. The website's consensus reads: "Campy by modern standards but spooky and atmospheric, House on Haunted Hill is a fun, well-executed cult classic featuring a memorable performance from genre icon Vincent Price." AllMovie has praised the film retrospectively, writing, "Campy and creepy in equal measures, House on Haunted Hill deserves its status as a horror classic."

== Legacy ==
House on Haunted Hill has developed a cult following in the decades since its original release. The film has been contemporarily exhibited at numerous revival screenings, including at the Museum of the Moving Image, the American Cinematheque, and the Academy of Motion Picture Arts and Sciences. Several modern repertory cinemas including the Film Forum, Loew's Jersey Theatre, Alex Theatre, and Music Box Theatre have hosted screenings in which the "Emergo" gimmick has been recreated.

On September 28, 2011, the estate of William Castle released an annotated screenplay from House on Haunted Hill which is a copy of the shooting script along with Castle's "margin notes" and the leather-bound style Castle used for his shooting script. This edition includes introductions from Joe Dante and Castle's daughter Terry. It also features its own version of "Emergo" in which the skeleton appears to readers via a "flip page" method. Mondo Media re-released the film 2015 as part of his Mondo X Chiller series on 28 March 2015 in the Alamo Drafthouse in Yonkers, New York.

In 2024, Entertainment Weekly ranked House on Haunted Hill at number 15 in a list of the 22 greatest haunted house film of all time.

== Remake ==
A remake of House on Haunted Hill was released in 1999, directed by William Malone and produced by Robert Zemeckis, Joel Silver, and William Castle's daughter, Terry Castle. It was the debut film of Dark Castle Entertainment, a company originally formed to remake Castle's horror films.

The remake was followed by a direct-to-DVD sequel, Return to House on Haunted Hill (2007).

== See also ==
- List of American films of 1959
- List of ghost films

== Sources ==
- Eisner, Joel (2013). The Price of Fear: The Film Career of Vincent Price in His Own Words. Antelope, California: Black Bed Sheet Books. ISBN 978-0-988-65902-5.
- Francis, James (2013). Remaking Horror: Hollywood's New Reliance on Scares of Old. Jefferson, North Carolina: McFarland & Company. ISBN 978-0-786-47088-4.
- Law, John W. (2000). Scare Tactic: The Life & Films of William Castle. San Jose, California: Writers Club Press. ISBN 978-0-595-09544-5.
- Leeder, Murray (2018). Horror Film: A Critical Introduction. New York City, New York: Bloomsbury. ISBN 978-1-501-31443-8.
- Mathijs, Ernest; Sexton, Jamie (2011). "Filmography". Cult Cinema: An Introduction. Hoboken, New Jersey: Wiley-Blackwell. pp. 243–252. ISBN 978-1-4051-7374-2.
- Senn, Bryan (2019). "Twice the Thrills! Twice the Chills!": Horror and Science Fiction Double Features, 1955-1974. Jefferson, North Carolina: McFarland & Company. ISBN 978-1-476-63571-2.
- Simpson, Paul (2010). The Rough Guide to Cult Movies: The Good, the Bad and the Very Weird (3rd ed.). London, England: Rough Guides. ISBN 978-1-84836-213-0.
- Warren, Bill (1986). Keep Watching The Skies! American Science Fiction Movies of the 1950s. Vol. 2. Jefferson, North Carolina: McFarland & Company. OCLC 18693157.
