= Robert Skotak =

American filmmaker

- Born: May 17, 1945 (age 81); Detroit, Michigan, U.S.
- Occupation: Visual effects artist
- Years active: 1975-present
- Relatives: Dennis Skotak (brother)

Robert Skotak (born May 17, 1945) is an American filmmaker and visual effects artist, known for his collaborations with director James Cameron. He won two Academy Awards for Best Visual Effects, for Aliens (1986) and Terminator 2: Judgment Day (1991), in addition to two BAFTA Awards and a Saturn Award. He is one the founders of the effects studios 4-Ward Productions and Whodoo EFX.

== Filmography ==
=== As visual effects supervisor ===
Year	Title	Director	Notes
1981	Escape from New York	John Carpenter
1982	Slapstick of Another Kind	Steven Paul
1985	Creature	William Malone
1986	Aliens	James Cameron	Academy Award for Best Visual Effects; BAFTA Award for Best Special Visual Effects; Saturn Award for Best Special Effects
1989	Lords of the Deep	Mary Ann Fisher
1989	The Abyss	James Cameron
1990	Tremors	Ron Underwood
1990	Darkman	Sam Raimi
1991	Terminator 2: Judgment Day	James Cameron	Academy Award for Best Visual Effects; BAFTA Award for Best Special Visual Effects
1991	Cast a Deadly Spell	Martin Campbell
1992	Batman Returns	Tim Burton	Nominated- Academy Award for Best Visual Effects; Nominated- BAFTA Award for Best Special Visual Effects
1993	Heart and Souls	Ron Underwood
1994	No Escape	Martin Campbell
1994	Clifford	Paul Flaherty
1994	The Pagemaster	Joe Johnston Pixote Hunt
1995	Tank Girl	Rachel Talalay
1996	The Arrival	David Twohy
1996	T2 3-D: Battle Across Time	James Cameron; John Bruno; Stan Winston	Theme park attraction
1997	Titanic	James Cameron
1997	Mouse Hunt	Gore Verbinski
1998	Hard Rain	Mikael Salomon
1999	House on Haunted Hill	William Malone
2003	X2	Bryan Singer
2004	Tremors 4: The Legend Begins	S. S. Wilson
2006	Trapped Ashes	Sean S. Cunningham; Joe Dante; Monte Hellman; John Gaeta; Ken Russell
2008	Starship Troopers 3: Marauder	Edward Neumeier
2009	The Hole	Joe Dante
2010	Road to Nowhere	Monte Hellman
2010	SP: The Motion Picture	Takafumi Hatano
2011	Cosmic Origins 3D	Martha R. Cotton	Documentary film
2011	SP: The Motion Picture II	Takafumi Hatano
2015	Harbinger Down	Alec Gillis

=== As visual effects artists ===
Year	Title	Director	Notes
1981	Galaxy of Terror	Bruce D. Clark	
1983	Jaws 3-D	Joe Alves	
1983	Strange Invaders	Michael Laughlin	
1983	To Be or Not to Be	Alan Johnson	
1984	The Terminator	James Cameron	
1985	City Limits	Aaron Lipstadt	
1992	Honey, I Blew Up the Kid	Randal Kleiser	
1995	The Alien Within	Scott P. Levy	
1996	Mars Attacks!	Tim Burton	
2002	Joe and Max	Steve James	
2002	The Tuxedo	Kevin Donovan	
2004	The Stepford Wives	Frank Oz	
2006	Failure to Launch	Tom Dey	
2007	Anamorph	Henry S. Miller	

=== As others ===
Year	Title	Director	Credit	Notes
1980	Battle Beyond the Stars	Jimmy Murakami	Miniature effects	
1981	Escape from New York	John Carpenter	Matte painting artist	
1982	Forbidden World	Allan Holzmann	Production design	
1982	The Aftermath	Steve Barkett	Miniature effects	
1992	Captain Ron	Thom Eberhardt	Miniature effects	
