= Syngenor =

- DVD cover art
- Directed by: George Elanjian Jr.
- Written by: Brent V. Friedman
- Produced by: Jack F. Murphy
- Starring: Starr Andreeff; Mitchell Laurance; David Gale
- Cinematography: James Mathers
- Edited by: Ellen Keneshea
- Music by: Thomas Chase; Steve Rucker
- Distributed by: America Cinema Marketing
- Release date: October 3, 1990
- Running time: 98 minutes
- Country: United States
- Language: English

Syngenor (also known as Scared To Death 2) is a 1990 B horror/science fiction film and a sequel to the 1980 film Scared to Death. The film was directed by George Elanjian Jr and written by Michael Carmody and Brent V. Friedman. It features David Gale and Kathryn Noble.

== Plot ==
Stan Armbrewster, an executive at military contractor Norton Cyberdyne, lures public relations head Tim Calhoun to the basement of the building with a pair of prostitutes. He shows them a reptilian humanoid, "Syngenor" (short for Synthesized Genetic Organism), the company's newest product. Armbrewster covertly releases the Syngenor and flees, leaving it to kill Calhoun and the prostitutes. The Syngenor then goes to the home of its creator, Ethan Valentine, kills him, and attacks his niece Susan. Susan manages to escape by hitting the Syngenor with a vase and then using a makeshift flamethrower, destroying it.

Norton Cyberdyne CEO Carter Brown summons the board, including Armbrewster, to a meeting regarding the deaths; he is paranoid about board members trying to unseat him, but does not know Armbrewster and Paula Gorski are the traitors. They listen to a presentation about the Syngenor, outlining its intended purpose as a supersoldier in a predicted war in the Middle East. David Greenwait, the new head of the project, reveals that the Syngenor can reproduce asexually every 24 hours, and several other Syngenors are in storage. After the meeting, Gorski orders Armbrewster to retrieve the project files and release the other Syngenors; as he is too afraid to do so, he tricks receptionist Bonnie into it. She finds the files but is killed by the Syngenors.

Susan meets Nick Carey, a journalist investigating Norton Cyberdyne, when he appears in Ethan's lab uninvited. They team up to infiltrate the company, with Susan posing as Nick's photographer. Nick meets with Armbrewster, who frames Carter for the Syngenor's killings at Gorski's instruction; however, Gorski allows Carter to hear this, revealing Armbrewster's treachery while making herself appear loyal. Meanwhile, Susan finds a museum displaying Norton Cyberdyne's products and takes pictures of a Syngenor prototype, only to be caught by security guard Donnie. Both Nick and Susan are brought to Carter, who gives Nick a release blaming Armbrewster to publish and threatens them both.

Carter, becoming increasingly unstable, summons security official Sam Krebs and sends his team to kill the Syngenors in the basement. Nick and Susan infiltrate the team and get photographic evidence, but barely escape from both Krebs and the Syngenors. They bring the photos to Susan's friend in the police force, Leo Rossell, but he is unable to help due to his superiors being on Norton Cyberdyne's payroll. At Susan's home, they argue until Nick insists he will help her pursue the truth, at which point she kisses him and they have sex. Later, they go to destroy an egg left by the first Syngenor, only to find it has already hatched. The new Syngenor kills Leo and pursues Nick and Susan all the way back to Norton Cyberdyne, where it is injured in an explosion.

Carter uses a prototype energy weapon to kill Armbrewster and has the Syngenors released into the building, causing a lockdown. Nick and Susan find most of the board murdered in the boardroom except for Gorski and Greenwait, who they release. Gorski tells them they can use the energy weapon to kill the Syngenors; as they head for the museum to retrieve it, they encounter a Syngenor that kills Greenwait. While Nick lures the Syngenors toward the elevator to trap them, Gorski reveals to Susan that she was the one who had the first Syngenor released and thus caused Ethan's death.

The elevator arrives in the basement, allowing Gorski to kill most of the Syngenors. When the last one attacks Nick, she tries to kill them both, but it then attacks her instead. The energy weapon goes off in their direction while they struggle, seemingly killing them. Nick and Susan return to the museum and confront the now-insane Carter. As he rants nonsensically, Gorski - fused with the Syngenor into a grotesque creature by the energy weapon's radiation - appears. She kills Carter and attacks Nick and Susan, but when Susan realizes water is the Syngenors' weakness, they activate the fire alarm, triggering a sprinkler that melts the creature.

With Ethan avenged and the Syngenors all dead, Nick and Susan leave Norton Cyberdyne. Some time later, the prototype Syngenor in the museum awakens and prepares to break out of its display case.

== Cast ==
- Starr Andreeff as Susan Valentine
- Mitchell Laurance as Nick Carey
- David Gale as Carter Brown
- Charles Lucia as Stan Armbrewster
- Riva Spier as Paula Gorski
- Jeff Doucette as David Greenwait
- Bill Gratton as Leo Rossell
- Lewis Arquette as Ethan Valentine
- Jon Korkes as Tim Calhoun
- Melanie Shatner as Bonnie Brown
- Ken Zavayna as Sam Krebs
- Roy Fegan as Donnie
- Kevin Glover, Lance Kruger, Charles Morrow and Thomas Threw as Syngenor Creatures

== Production ==
Producer Jack F. Murphy saw the original Scared to Death and was so impressed with the monster that he wanted to make another film utilizing the same monster design. However, since the first film was so low-budget and rarely seen he wanted to distance this sequel from it in order not to alienate a new potential audience that never heard of the first film. This is why there is no character or plot carry-over from Scared to Death other than the monster. Scared to Death director William Malone was asked and was originally going to direct this sequel. Malone ended up passing on the project as he had an opportunity to direct Creature. However, he participated in creating the film's monster costumes.

== Releases ==
Elite Entertainment and Synapse Films both released the film on Region 0 NTSC DVD.

Prism Leisure Corporation released the film on a double sided PAL DVD, the other side showing Progeny.
