= Creature (1985 film) =

1985 film by William Malone

- Original US theatrical poster
- Directed by: William Malone
- Screenplay by: William Malone; Alan Reed
- Produced by: William G. Dunn
- Starring: Stan Ivar; Wendy Schaal; Lyman Ward; Klaus Kinski
- Cinematography: Harry Mathias
- Edited by: Bette Jane Cohen
- Music by: Thomas Chase; Steve Rucker
- Production company: Trans World Entertainment
- Distributed by: Cardinal Entertainment Corporation
- Release date: April 26, 1985 (U.S.)
- Running time: 97 minutes
- Country: United States
- Language: English
- Budget: $750,000–1.3 million
- Box office: $8 million (North America)

Creature (also known as The Titan Find and Titan Find) is a 1985 American science fiction horror film directed by William Malone and starring Stan Ivar, Wendy Schaal, Lyman Ward and Klaus Kinski. It was the first feature produced by Moshe Diamant and his company Trans World Entertainment.

Reviews were largely negative, though Kinski's performance received some praise as did the special effects and set design. Creature has often been compared to Alien, although the gothic atmosphere and possession angle have also been likened to one of Alien's forebears, Planet of the Vampires.

== Plot ==
Two geological researchers for the American multinational corporation NTI find an ancient alien laboratory on Titan, the largest moon of Saturn. In the lab is an egg-like container which is keeping an alien creature alive. The creature emerges and kills the researchers. Two months later, the geologists' spaceship crashes into the space station Concorde in orbit around Earth's Moon, its pilot having died in his seat.

NTI dispatches a new ship, the Shenandoah, to Titan. Its crew, consisting of Captain Mike Davison, Susan Delambre, Jon Fennel, Dr. Wendy H. Oliver, David Perkins and Beth Sladen, is accompanied by the taciturn security officer Melanie Bryce. While in orbit, the crew locate a signal coming from the moon—the distress call of a ship from the rival West German multinational Richter Dynamics. The ground collapses beneath their landing site, dropping the Shenandoah into a cavern and wrecking it. When radio communication fails, a search party is sent out to contact the Germans.

In the West German ship, they find the egg-like container and the dead bodies of the crew. The creature appears and kills Delambre when she lags behind the escaping group. Fennel goes into shock at the sight and Bryce sedates him. When they return to their own ship, the Americans find that one of the West Germans, Hans Rudy Hofner, has snuck aboard. He tells them his crew was slain by the creature, which was buried with other organisms as part of a galactic menagerie. He proposes returning to his ship to get explosives, but the crew are unwilling to risk it.

The creature's undead victims are controlled by the creature through parasites. Unsupervised in the medbay, Fennel sees the undead Delambre through a porthole and follows her outside. She strips naked, and he stands transfixed while she removes his helmet. He asphyxiates, and then she attaches an alien parasite to his head. Now under alien control, Fennel sends a transmission to his crewmates, inviting them over to the German ship. Hofner and Bryce are sent to get some air tanks for the Shenandoah and stand guard over it, while the rest of the crew go over to the Richter ship. Hofner and Bryce stop over at the menagerie on their way, and are attacked by Delambre. The rest of the crew find Fennel with a bandage on his head to conceal his parasite. Davison insists that medical officer Oliver examine his head, so Fennel has her accompany him to the engineering quarters to feed her to the creature. Davison and Perkins notice Fennel does not sweat and go check on them. They find Oliver has been decapitated by the creature. Perkins blows up Fennel's head with his pistol.

Sladen runs into an infected Hofner. She escapes the ship, and in her haste, only puts on her helmet after exiting. Perkins spots her outside and opens the airlock. Now unconscious, Sladen is carried in by Hofner to lure the others. They fight, and Davison defeats Hofner by ripping off his parasite. The three survivors formulate a plan to electrocute the creature with the ship's fusion modules, which can only be accessed by going through the engineering quarters.

Alarms sound as a creature makes its way through the ship, committing sabotage. Sladen and Davison construct the electrocution trap, while Perkins goes to the computer room to monitor the creature. The creature arrives, and they apparently electrocute it to death. However, when Davison leaves, it captures Sladen.

Davison and Perkins follow her screaming and find her locked inside engineering. Studying the ship's blueprints, they find another entrance to engineering. Perkins lures away the creature while Davison retrieves Sladen. On the way, Perkins locates one of the bombs Hofner mentioned. The creature jumps him. Dying, Perkins attaches the bomb to the creature and sets a countdown so Davison can jettison it through the airlock. It climbs back aboard, however, so Davison tackles it, throwing himself out the airlock. When the bomb fails to explode, Bryce appears and shoots it, which sets it off and kills the creature. She recovers Davison and reunites with Sladen, who dresses Davison's wounds. The trio leaves Titan aboard the West German ship.

== Cast ==
- Stan Ivar as Mike Davison
- Wendy Schaal as Beth Sladen
- Lyman Ward as David Perkins
- Robert Jaffe as Jon Fennel
- Diane Salinger as Melanie Bryce
- Annette McCarthy as Dr. Wendy H. Oliver
- Klaus Kinski as Hans Rudy Hofner
- Marie Laurin as Susan Delambre

== Production ==
=== Development and writing ===
Distributor William Dunn, a friend of director William Malone's, informed him that his colleague Moshe Diamant of Trans World Entertainment was looking to venture into production, and was willing to hear pitches. Although Trans World brass was interested in a creature feature in the mold of his first film Scared to Death, Malone pushed for a dystopian story akin to Blade Runner, called Murder in the 21st Century. The executives initially went along, but when he delivered his screenplay in January 1984, they rejected it due to limited commercial appeal, and asked him to come up with a new pitch at a single night's notice. Malone unearthed the first couple of pages of an unfinished screenplay from his personal archive, which his backers immediately greenlit. The original script, had more of a gothic, space vampire theme. The Titan Find was Malone's chosen title. His co-writer, under the pseudonym Alan Reed, was effects specialist Robert Short, who had already seconded Malone on Scared to Death. Dunn made his debut as a producer, while Harry Mathias made his feature debut as a cinematographer.

A collector of everything Forbidden Planet, Malone inserted easter eggs into Creature. The opening makes an allusion to a race of aliens that traveled the universe millennia ago and collected species across their travels, which mirrors the Krell's backstory in Forbidden Planet. In addition, the characters of Doctor Wendy H. Oliver (initials W.H.O.) and Beth Sladen (Elizabeth Sladen) are references to Doctor Who. Sladen suggests a way to kill the creature based on The Thing from Another World. One of the characters is also called Delambre, the name of the protagonist's family in The Fly. Originally, the demise of the German crew was not explored in much detail, but when Klaus Kinski was cast, Malone was asked to rewrite the script to accommodate a major German character.

=== Casting ===
Due to the film's modest budget, most of the actors were relative unknowns. Patti Davis, daughter of U.S. president and former actor Ronald Reagan, auditioned for the film, but she came surrounded by Secret Service agents and, although she gave a good reading, Malone thought her entourage could disrupt the film's tight schedule and passed on her. About one and a half weeks before the shoot, the director was informed that the producers had splurged extra money to hire Klaus Kinski and add prestige to the production. Kinski was at first quite committed to his role, sitting down with the director to discuss the script and suggesting minor changes. The German took the role for his son Nanhoï, who was a fan of space adventure films.

=== Production and creature design ===
The visual effects were overseen by Larry Benson's L.A. Effects Group, a fledgling shop featuring many of the same people who had worked on Jaws 3-D with Private Stock Effects. Robert Skotak served as director of visual effects, while his brother Dennis was the visual effects director of photography. Earlier in their career, the two brothers had been pillars of New World Pictures' effects lab, and as such had experience working with James Cameron on the similar Galaxy of Terror. This would lead to L.A. Effects' hiring for Aliens shortly after Creature.

Robert Skotak doubled as the film's storyboard artist and production designer, and was responsible for most of the space architecture. The German ship was given an expressionist look with grey tones and protruding shapes to contrast with its American counterpart. The light board seen in the German ship's communication room is a replica of the one seen in The Invisible Boy and several other horror films. Specific elements were suggested by Malone, such as the American ship's exterior, which he based on a Krell powering device seen in Forbidden Planet. Malone also convinced Metro-Goldwyn-Mayer to lend him original artifacts from that film to decorate the Titan lab, and imply that his creature was a specimen discovered by the Krell during their space travels. Other props, such as helmets, were made by Malone's own effect shop, The Dartford Company. The graphics seen on the film's computers were contributed by Robert Alvarez, a veteran animator at Hanna-Barbera. The budget reserved for set dressing was limited, with art director Michael Novotny pegging it at about $120,000.

The main monster was also designed by Robert Skotak. It was a lengthy process and Malone rejected a number of early concepts, some because they would have been impractical on the film's budget. One of these, which evokes an insect, can be glimpsed in Cinefantastique's contemporary coverage of the film. The final creature is more saurian-like, with the Los Angeles Times' Kevin Thomas comparing it to Godzilla. The team building the suit and miniatures was led by Doug Beswick, who too would go on to work on Aliens. Bruce Zahlava, an employee of Malone's effects shop, designed the make-up effects, including the head parasite. Jill Rockow, who was recommended by her mentor Dick Smith for her skills in prosthetics application, was hired to assist him.

=== Filming and post-production ===
Due to the project's late increase in scope, no dedicated film studio could be booked in time. It was therefore decided to erect the sets inside a disused industrial warehouse near Burbank Airport. No exteriors were used. A total of twenty-four sets were built. Malone's MGM connections once again came through with some used set panels. The shoot was delayed by thirteen days to allow some late tweaks to the creature, which was as much as the production could allow. Principal photography began on June 25, 1984, and lasted slightly more than eight weeks.

While Malone found the cast more motivated in Kinski's presence, Kinski proved true to his reputation and was difficult to work with. He sometimes refused to show up for the lengthy make-up sessions, forcing Rockow to carry him to the make-up room. A make-up girl was groped, and when Kinski's agent was called about it, he appeared unsurprised. The actor also groped co-star Diane Sallinger in a scene that remains in the final cut and, although this is not suggested by the camera coverage, is said to have been unscripted. Furthermore, Kinski often refused to follow his marks, leaving part of his footage out of focus and unusable.

Kinski was only contracted for one week of work. The sequence where his character is heavily mutated was shot with two doubles, a complex endeavor as neither looked particularly close to him. Diamant offered to bring Kinski back for pick-ups, but quickly determined that it was not worth the trouble of working with him again. The monster required four or five people to animate via cables, in addition to the performer inside the suit. Bruce Zahlava left halfway into the shoot due to disagreements with the producers, and Jill Rockow ascended to his position for the remainder. Rockow felt supported by Malone, who had a background in practical effects himself. Fennel's head explosion was done with a Primacord detonator, which required the entire crew to vacate the set after getting the camera rolling.

The original draft's gothic vibe subsists in a few aspects of the filmed product. The lightning seen in the prologue hearkens back to it, as does Malone's insistence on shooting in widescreen Panavision. The company that did not have a history of supporting independent projects, and their anamorphic lenses made visual effects more cumbersome, leading to some pushback from the crew. After seeing some early footage, Diamant was satisfied enough that he decided to pump more money into the film, and give it a Dolby mix at the Saul Zaentz Film Center in Berkeley, California. During promotion, the budget was pegged between $3.8 and 4.2 million. However, Malone has since admitted that those figures were exaggerated by Trans World to give the film more cachet. In 1988, the actual price tag was quoted by a crew member as $1.3 million. In 2012, Malone said that the provisional budget was $350,000, later bumped up to $750,000.

=== Comparisons to Alien ===
Even during production, Malone was questioned about Creature's similarities with Alien. He responded that genre films are by nature derivative, and that he suspected the similarities to Alien most likely came about because he and Alien's screenwriter Dan O'Bannon were inspired by the same films. He added that his Creature pitch had been written six or seven years prior to being sold, drawing from It! The Terror from Beyond Space for elements such as the toxic gas, and It Conquered the World for the parasites.

== Release ==
=== Pre-release ===
The film's alternate poster by Barry Jackson

The monster was not shown in promotional shots, supposedly to surprise the audience. The release was originally planned for January 1985. The movie premiered at the Paris International Festival of Fantastic and Science-Fiction Film held between November 22 and December 2, 1984. It was also selected for the Brussels International Fantastic Film Festival held between March 15 and 30, 1985. According to Mathias, Diamant insisted on the title change from The Titan Find to Creature.

=== Theatrical ===
Creature opened in U.S. theaters on April 26, 1985, via distributor Cardinal Entertainment Corporation. The film opened on around 300 screens in Los Angeles and the West Coast, before moving to other areas of the country in a touring release. It opened in New York City on September 20, 1985. While that distribution scheme precluded it from receiving national media attention, the film briefly cracked the Variety's top 10 (which was based on a sample of theaters and therefore friendlier to non-wide releases) and made around $8 million at the box office according to Malone. In the U.K., Miracle Films released it as The Titan Find in a double feature with Deadly Blessing, with the earliest screenings on record dated May 3, 1985.

For its first months of release, the film's poster was based on art by Todd Curtis. By late August 1985, when it resumed its run in New York state, it had been replaced with an entirely different painting by Barry Jackson. The Jackson version was retained for some foreign and ancillary markets.

== Reception ==
Creature has received mixed-to-negative reviews from critics. On the review aggregator website Rotten Tomatoes, 29% of 7 critics' reviews are positive, with an average rating of 4.1/10.

=== Contemporary ===
Peter Stack of the San Francisco Chronicle gave the film one of its most positive contemporary reviews, saying that "the picture looks terrific on the screen thanks to a lot of shadows, good sets, and wooshing sound effects." He added that "for sci-fi lovers and horror fans, it's a very zippy and tight film. An effective scare yarn that pokes fun at itself as often as it keeps you on the edge of your seat." Kevin Thomas of the Los Angeles Times granted that "this science-fiction horror picture is no cheap schlocker, but an earnest effort with decent hardware and special effects and a fine, soaring score." However, he found that it failed to rise above "trite, predictable material." George Williams of the Sacramento Bee derided the film's "bargain basement sets, soap opera acting – and its grand larceny of plot lines", although he accepted that it was "ably directed" by Malone and boasted "some edge of your seat moments". John A. Douglas of The Grand Rapids Press acknowledged that it was an "unashamed rip-off of Alien", but "it could have been worse". He criticized "some terrible acting" and "a script that sounds as if it were written by a valley girl", but commended "art director Michael Novotny, whose interior spaceship sets give a look of class." Bill Cosford of The Miami Herald wrote that Kinski's unhinged appearance was "the only time Creature is at all fun", and that it was "indeed pretty bad, though it does have some competent effects work." Kenneth Shorey of The Birmingham News deemed that it "seems to take much longer than its 97 minutes", as "the dialogue is all very measured and slow, and there's a great deal of aimless meandering back and forth between spaceships." Eleanor Ringel of The Atlanta Journal wrote that "imitation may be the sincerest form of flattery, but there's nothing flattering about an under-lit, over-acted rip-off like this."

Reaction from the enthusiast press was along the same lines. The Phantom of the Movies, the New York Daily News' resident genre critic, assessed that it "isn't the worst Alien clone to come down the sci-fi pike over the past half-decade, but it's every bit as pointless as its similarly counterfeit counterparts. The requisite shock effects are competently crafted [...] and the performances are passable if uninspired." Alan Jones of British magazine Starburst wrote that although "Klaus Kinski adds a touch of class to the proceedings" and "the special effects by the L.A. Effects Group [...] are top notch", "there are far more laughs than real shocks". In Imagine magazine, Neil Gaiman stated that it was "an Alien rip-off, in which brain-sucking monsters severely menace astronauts on Titan, Saturn's largest moon. Lots of bone-crunching, oozings, and going into dark cabins on one's own."

=== Retrospective ===
VideoHound's Golden Movie Retriever assessed that this "Alien rip-off has its moments, but not enough of them. Klaus Kinski provides some laughs." TV Guide was measured, saying that "[t]he film does have some effective moments, and the performers are competent, if undistinguished. Though it earns a zero on the originality scale, Creature packs enough of a wallop to save it from being a total washout." Fantasy author and scholar John L. Flynn opined that "[d]ark, expertly photographed in shadowy interiors that recall the claustrophobic paranoia of Howard Hawks' The Thing from Another World (1951), Malone titillates viewers with equal doses of sex and violence. While derivative of Planet of the Vampires (1965) and Alien, the film offers lots of scary fun."

=== Accolades ===
Year	Award	Category	Subject	Result	Ref.
1984	Paris International Festival of Fantastic and Science-Fiction Film	Golden Unicorn	—N/a	Nominated	
1985	Brussels International Fantastic Film Festival	Golden Raven	—N/a	Nominated	
1985	Academy of Science Fiction, Fantasy and Horror Films – Saturn Awards	Best Special Effects	Larry Benson	Nominated	

== Post release ==
=== Home media ===
Creature's home video rights were acquired by Heron Communications in June 1985, and the film was released on VHS and Betamax in the fourth week of October through their Media Home Entertainment label. The video sleeve reverted to the original art. In 2007, Creature was shown on the horror hosted television series Cinema Insomnia. Apprehensive Films later released the Cinema Insomnia version on DVD. Such niche releases led to a rumor that the film had fallen into the public domain, although that was incorrect.

On March 16, 2013, Malone re-issued Creature on DVD via his personal label Luminous Processes, under the title The Titan Find, uncut and in widescreen. The DVD was made from an answer print kept in storage by Malone himself. He hoped to secure a broader distribution for a Blu-ray version, and Synapse Films was mentioned a possible distributor. The Blu-ray was released by Vinegar Syndrome on November 26, 2021. It includes both the theatrical version and the director's cut.

=== Novelization ===
A novelization of William Malone's screenplay by Christian Francis was published in trade paperback, mass market paperback and ebook form by Encyclocalypse, as part of a series of retro genre movie tie-ins, in both Creature and Titan Find covers. The book, to which Malone contributed a foreword, was released on September 1, 2021.

== Related works ==
=== Deep Space ===
Trans World planned a direct sequel, Creature II, which it assigned to director Fred Olen Ray. However, Ray did not care for the proposed script, and asked to replace it with one of his own that fell into the same genre. Thus, the project became the similar but unrelated 1988 release Deep Space.

=== Supernova ===
Although somewhat defensive about Alien comparisons, Malone did know artist H.R. Giger, whom he had met while working at Don Post Studios, a manufacturer of fright masks where Giger developed prototypes for Ridley Scott's film. After Creature, Malone made a few attempts to work with Giger in earnest. The second, Dead Star, came in 1990. It was going to reunite Malone with art director Michael Novotny, VFX siblings Robert and Dennis Skotak, and brothers Sunil and Ash Shah, former TWE executives who had since formed a new company, Imperial Entertainment. However, it got stuck in development hell. Ash Shah eventually found a home for the project at MGM, who released it in 2000 as Supernova, although Malone and Giger were long gone by that point.

== Works cited ==
- Malone, William (director) (2012). Titan Find a.k.a. Creature. DVD commentary (Media notes). Luminous Processes.
- Edwards, Matthew, ed. (2016). "An Interview with Cinematographer Harry Mathias". Klaus Kinski, Beast of Cinema: Critical Essays and Fellow Filmmaker Interviews. Jefferson: McFarland & Company. pp. 221–227. ISBN 9780786498970.
