= Supernova (2000 film) =

2000 American sci-fi film

- Theatrical release poster
- Directed by: Walter Hill (as Thomas Lee); Uncredited: Jack Sholder; Francis Ford Coppola
- Screenplay by: David C. Wilson
- Story by: William Malone; Daniel Chuba
- Produced by: Ash R. Shah; Daniel Chuba; Jamie Dixon
- Starring: James Spader; Angela Bassett; Robert Forster; Lou Diamond Phillips; Peter Facinelli; Robin Tunney; Wilson Cruz
- Cinematography: Lloyd Ahern II
- Edited by: Michael Schweiter; Melissa Kent; Francis Ford Coppola; Freeman A. Davies
- Music by: David C. Williams
- Production companies: Metro-Goldwyn-Mayer Pictures; Screenland Pictures; Hammerhead Productions
- Distributed by: MGM Distribution Co. (United States and Canada); United International Pictures (international)
- Release date: January 14, 2000
- Running time: 90 minutes
- Country: United States
- Language: English
- Budget: $60–90 million
- Box office: $14.8 million

Supernova is a 2000 American science fiction film written by David C. Wilson, William Malone, and Daniel Chuba, and directed by Walter Hill, credited as "Thomas Lee."

Malone originally developed the film in the late 1980s as Dead Star, with paintings by H. R. Giger and a plot pitched as Hellraiser (1987) or Dead Calm (1989) in space. Metro-Goldwyn-Mayer then bought it in the 1990s, and retitled it Supernova; Malone was no longer involved. "Thomas Lee" was chosen as a directorial pseudonym for release in lieu of Alan Smithee, as the latter had become too well known as a badge of a film being disowned by its makers. Jack Sholder was hired for substantial uncredited reshoots, and Francis Ford Coppola was brought in for editing purposes. Various sources suggest that little of Hill's work remains in the theatrical cut of the film. The cast features James Spader, Angela Bassett, Robert Forster, Lou Diamond Phillips, Peter Facinelli, Robin Tunney, and Wilson Cruz. The film was shot by cinematographer Lloyd Ahern II and scored by composers David C. Williams and Burkhard Dallwitz.

Released domestically by MGM Distribution Co. and internationally by United International Pictures on January 14, 2000, the film was panned by critics, who criticized the story, characters, pacing, and effects, and was a box-office bomb, only grossing $14.8 million against its budget of between $60–90 million during its theatrical release, with an estimated loss of $83 million.

== Plot ==
Supernova chronicles the search-and-rescue patrol of the medical ship Nightingale 229 in deep space in the early 22nd century and its six-member crew, which includes captain and pilot A.J. Marley, co-pilot Nick Vanzant, medical officer Kaela Evers, medical technician Yerzy Penalosa, search and rescue paramedic Danika Lund and computer technician Benjamin Sotomejor. Aboard their vessel, they receive an emergency distress signal coming from an ice mining operation on the moon Titan 37, more than 3,000 light-years away.

The crew answers the call and dimension-jumps—during which Captain Marley suffers fatal injuries due to a malfunction of the ship's equipment—arriving in the path of Titan 37's debris cloud, some of which damages the ship and causes the loss of 82 percent of its maneuvering fuel. Worse still, Titan 37 orbits a blue giant, and its high gravity field will pull the ship to the point where it will be incinerated in 17 hours, 12 minutes—which happens to be almost the same amount of time that the Nightingale 229 will need to recharge its jump drive, their only possible hope for escape. With only an 11-minute window for escape, the surviving crew soon find themselves in danger from the disturbing young man they rescue, and the mysterious alien artifact he has smuggled aboard. This artifact is analyzed by the ship's computer and is said to contain nine-dimensional matter.

It is ultimately discovered that the young man who called for rescue is actually Karl Larson, an old former lover of Kaela (it is implied that he was abusive). Karl came into contact with the nine-dimensional matter after recovering the artifact. It somehow enabled him to acquire superhuman strength and supernatural healing abilities, and made him younger (such that Kaela did not recognize him). Karl murders most of the crew except Kaela and strands Nick on the mining platform. Karl fails to romantically reconcile with Kaela. Nick finds his way back to the medical ship through a rescue pod left on the mining platform, and a battle ensues between Nick and Karl. Karl is ultimately killed by Kaela using explosives placed near the alien artifact which Karl was obsessed with retrieving. The explosion ejects the artifact into space, hurtling it towards the blue giant.

With moments left before the dimension jump activates, Kaela and Nick place themselves into the only remaining dimensional stabilization chamber (Karl had destroyed all but one), which is the only thing that enables human beings to survive the ship's dimensional jump drive. The pods are meant to hold only one person; two subjects might be genetically mixed during the dimensional jump. Before Nick and Kaela enter the last pod, the computer warns them that the nine-dimensional matter is reacting with the gravity of the blue giant sun and will cause a nine-dimensional reaction that will spread in all directions, such that the reaction's resulting supernova will reach Earth within 51 years. The computer hypothesizes that the reaction will either destroy life on Earth or "enable humankind to achieve a new level of existence". Just before the blue giant supernovas, the ship engages in a dimensional jump which brings Nick and Kaela back to Earth. As a result of their being in the same pod, the two of them each have one eye of the other person's original eye color. The ship's computer also reveals that Kaela is pregnant, which may be the result of them being in the pod together during the jump, or the result of their copulation hours earlier.

== Cast ==
- James Spader as Nick Vanzant, Co-Pilot
- Angela Bassett as Dr. Kaela Evers, Medical Officer
- Robert Forster as A.J. Marley, Captain and Pilot
- Lou Diamond Phillips as Yerzy Penalosa, Medical Technician
- Peter Facinelli as Karl Larson
- Robin Tunney as Danika Lund, Search and Rescue Paramedic
- Wilson Cruz as Benjamin Sotomejor, Computer Technician
- Eddy Rice Jr. as Flyboy
- Knox Grantham White (Kerrigan Mahan, voice) as Troy Larson
- Vanessa Marshall (voice) as Sweetie
- Kevin Sizemore (uncredited) as Rescue Leader

== Production ==
=== Development as Dead Star ===
The project originated in the late 1980s with horror filmmaker William Malone, who initially described it as "Hellraiser in space". In 1990, Malone pitched it under the title Dead Star, saying it would be like "Dead Calm in space" and envisioned it as a modestly budgeted film that would cost around $5–6 million. He developed the idea after producer Ash R. Shah asked him for a project in a similar vein to Creature (1985).

According to Malone in 2000, the original concept of Dead Star concerned a space mission sent to retrieve a spaceship that had been lost a year or two earlier and was now stranded on the edge of a black hole. Upon arrival, the rescuers discover alien devices that had been recovered from a planet where the local inhabitants had made contact with the Devil. These devices had already killed the original crew, and the malevolent force—effectively the Devil itself—was now loose aboard the ship. In a later account, Malone described its depiction of hell as a literal parallel dimension and said the device would also unleash nightmarish manifestations and bats.

Malone and Shah asked H. R. Giger to produce conceptual sketches to help promote the script and attract financing. Malone spent about ten days (or roughly a week) working with Giger at the artist’s home in Zurich around Christmas 1990. Giger designed elements including the Thanatron (a large machine resembling bundled decaying organ pipes, standing some thirty feet high), the Shard (a key device connected to the Thanatron capable of raising the dead), and a multifaced Satan with huge horns and a cloak of living souls; he was paid 10,000 Swiss francs for the work. Giger himself later described the project as a "sort of Hellraiser in space" and noted that the eventual version was a much simplified take on what had attracted him.

Despite several studios interest in the script, the original low-budget version struggled to secure financing as its scope expanded. Malone later said he lost track of the project after the rights were sold.

=== Development as Supernova ===
Metro-Goldwyn-Mayer (MGM) bought the project, now titled Supernova, and a series of writers were put on the script, including David Campbell Wilson, Daniel Chuba, Cathy Rabin and Thomas Wheeler. By 1997 the story had changed to be about a deep space medical ship called the Nova which answers a distress signal and finds an aging cargo vessel about to be sucked into a black hole. The sole survivor of the sinking ship comes on board the Nova.

Because a film with a plot similar to Malone's initial concept, Event Horizon (1997), had recently been released, Supernova was largely reworked to avoid appearing to imitate it or other science-fiction works such as Alien (1979), Sphere (1998), and the television series Lost in Space (1965–1968). According to production designer Marek Dobrowolski: "We wanted to get away from that concept that was produced so well and reproduced many, many times by others." Instead, Dobrowolski described Supernova as more a combination of 2001: A Space Odyssey (1968) and Crimson Tide (1995), emphasizing "confined horror sequences and the simplicity of 2001." He also expressed hope that the film would still feel distinctive.

Australian Geoffrey Wright was originally attached to direct but left the project two months before principal photography was to begin due to "creative differences." Apparently, he had an idea about shooting the entire film in zero gravity, but MGM disagreed. Vincent D'Onofrio was originally cast as the computer tech but when Wright was fired, D'Onofrio also walked out. James Spader was cast in the lead.

Wright was replaced by Jack Sholder. However, MGM head Frank Mancuso Sr. was reluctant to use him. Spader campaigned for Walter Hill, who had written and produced the three Alien films. Hill says he "was interested in doing a science fiction thing"; he thought the script "had fixable problems" and he wanted to work with James Spader.

MGM were worried that the Screen Actors Guild would strike that summer (which ended up being averted). They did not delay the April 1998 start date, which left Hill only weeks to organize the production. He spent much of that time reworking the script, not knowing that the president of United Artists (Lindsay Doran) was very attached to the script.

"Walter's vision of the film was different from the studio's. It's a shame that couldn't be resolved during production," screenwriter David Wilson said.

=== Filming ===
Filming began in April 1998. Hill said the budget of the film was cut halfway through production.

Visual effects house Digital Domain was once considering a production collaboration with MGM. Under such a deal, the visual effects would be delivered below market rates, since Digital, as a partial owner of some MGM films, would have an incentive to keep costs down. The collaboration fell through and the production had to pay for "the full spa treatment," according to producer Daniel Chubas. MGM had to scrap about half of the planned visual effects shots. A weightless sex scene between Robin Tunney and Peter Facinelli was shot in seats mounted on a rotating pole that was digitally removed in post-production. The script also involved a cutting-edge robot—remotely operated by someone's manipulating gloves—that performs long-distance medical examinations. This became an actor dressed as an android. Finally, a sequence where Spader rescued someone inside a bubble of zero-gravity water was never filmed.

After principal photography was finished in July 1998, Hill spent 24 weeks editing his director's cut of the film, which still did not have all the visual effects scenes added into it. MGM decided to screen the film to a test audience. Hill told them that the screening would be a complete disaster because the film was still not finished and because he wanted to shoot some more footage. MGM refused, saying the additional footage would cost another $1.5 million. Hill would not return to work until Mancuso met with him, and Mancuso would not meet with Hill until the director returned to work.

MGM screened the film and, just as Hill had predicted, the test screening audience hated it. Hill later said,

We limped in, in post we had a tremendous amount of effect stuff to do. They decided they wanted to preview the movie without the visual effects. I said this was insane, it's a science fiction movie. The visual effects had to be added. They wanted to see how it played. I told them it would be like shit, terrible, very bad preview, you will give up on the movie. These previews under these conditions are political. "Are you saying you won't preview the movie?" I said "You own the God damn thing. If you want to preview it, I can't prevent you, but I won't go." They saw this as defiance.

After more arguments with MGM, Hill quit the project.

=== New director, Jack Sholder ===
After test screenings went badly MGM hired another director, Jack Sholder, to re-edit Hill's footage and do some re-shoots to try to save the film. Sholder deleted many scenes from Hill's version, including scenes of character development, added the scene where James Spader's character is piloting the ship to safety after they jump into the supernova high-gravity field (originally the auto-pilot saved the ship from the crash but Sholder wanted to give Spader's character something more to do), added some scenes with more focus on humor, changed the original voice of the ship's computer Sweetie and added a new one which had "more emotion", removed all the dialogue from another computer called George who was on Titan and who gave Nick some information about the mining colony, removed the original rocklike/electronic score by Burkhard Dallwitz, and added a new one by David C. Williams.

After Sholder's cut was test screened and got a better reaction from a test audience, new executives took over MGM/UA: Alex Yemenidjian, and Chris McGurk. They were unhappy with the reaction that Supernova got from the test screening of Sholder's cut. The studio went back to Hill, who proposed $5 million of reshoots and wanted more time for filming. When the studio refused, Hill quit the project for good and MGM then shelved the film.

=== Francis Ford Coppola ===
In August 1999, MGM board member Francis Ford Coppola was brought in by MGM to supervise another re-editing of the film, at the cost of $1 million, at his American Zoetrope facility in Northern California. This work included digitally placing Bassett's and Spader's faces on the bodies of (a computer-tinted) Tunney and Facinelli so that their characters could have a love scene.

Coppola's re-edited version had poor results from test screening; it also did not get the PG-13 rating from the MPAA that the studio wanted. Creature designer Patrick Tatopoulos, whose special effects were mostly cut out from the film, said that Hill wanted the film to be much more grotesque, strange and disturbing, while MGM wanted to make it more of a hip, sexy film in space and they did not want a full-blown makeup effects film.

"I hope that my experience in the film industry has helped improve the picture and rectified some of the problems that losing a director caused", said Coppola.

By October 1999, MGM decided to sell the film.

The film was eventually released on January 14, 2000, almost two years later than planned.

== Original cut and deleted scenes ==
The theatrical trailer of the film, featuring songs "Fly" by Sugar Ray and "Mama Told Me Not To Come" by Three Dog Night, shows many alternate takes of some scenes, extended versions of some others, parts of a few deleted scenes, including the one where Nick finds the real Troy on the Titan moon turned into a fetus and Troy begging Nick to help him, and a couple of shots of the original ending where Karl is killed by a dimensional jump.

Four endings were filmed.

Dialogue by the ship's computer, Sweetie, in a theatrical ending where it tells Nick and Kaela that the Supernova will either destroy Earth or make it and humankind better, and that Kaela is pregnant, was added later in post-production during one of the re-edits of the film, most probably during the one supervised by Francis Ford Coppola. Original dialogue said only that the supernova will destroy Earth in 257 years and that it's unstoppable.

When he took over the editing of the film, Francis Ford Coppola put together the zero-gravity sex scene between Angela Bassett and James Spader using outtakes of the zero-gravity sex scene between Robin Tunney and Peter Facinelli that happens later in the film, with Tunney's skin color being digitally darkened. He did this to add more to the relationship between Bassett's and Spader's characters.

Originally, main villain Karl mutated into a demonic monster during the final part of the film. Although much time and effort was spent on special make-up effects for these scenes, MGM decided that they didn't like it because they "couldn't see the actor", so all the creature footage was cut and re-shot with Karl being only partially mutated in the final cut.

Many promotional stills come from deleted scenes that were not included on DVD/Blu-ray versions of the film. These include Kaela and Danika dressing up the Flyboy robot, Nick investigating the Titan mining colony and more areas of it, Nick finding more cocooned dead bodies of miners and examining them, Karl's original monstrous look, and Karl's original death sequence.

Hill said in an interview some years after the film was released that his version was much darker, had a very different setup and that ending was much different. He also expressed a strong dislike for the way the studio changed the film, but said that James Spader did a great job with his role.

Lou Diamond Phillips, who plays Yerzy, turned down the role the first few times it was offered to him, but after Hill was hired as director, Hill called Phillips and sent him 40 pages of his re-written script, which Phillips liked and accepted the role. When the filming began, Hill was forced to keep rewriting the script while studio executives were on the set watching over him. Hill also substantially rewrote the original script because he wanted to distance the film from Alien (1979), a film which he produced. Phillips also said that once Francis Ford Coppola was called in to re-edit the film, he sent everyone from the cast a letter saying, "All of your work in this film is quite good. It has its problems. I'm going to recut it, hopefully in the spirit of what Walter Hill wanted." Hill ultimately took his name from the film.

DVD and Blu-ray versions include several deleted scenes as bonus features. These scenes are:

- Alternate opening where Captain Marley gives a philosophical speech about space.
- Vanzant makes an entry to his autodiary.
- Dr. Evers performs an autopsy on a recently deceased crew member (a propulsion engineer named "Lucky" Chow Li who drank too much alcohol).
- Captain Marley tells Vanzant to visit Dr. Evers for a medical examination, because he doesn't want to lose another crew member.
- Captain Marley gives Vanzant some advice on how to get the respect of the crew.
- Sweetie tells Vanzant about the computer on Titan 37, whose name is George.
- George gives Vanzant some background information about Titan 37.
- Vanzant searches the operational level for fuel.
- Vanzant finds a life form in the operations housing. Later he discovers that this life form is the real Troy.
- A more violent version of the fighting scene between Karl and Yerzy, in which Karl crushes Yerzy's head and his eyes pop out.
- An extended version of the scene where Vanzant enters the ship. When the hatch turns around Karl shoots, but instead of Vanzant he shoots at the already dead Troy (who died before on Titan 37). The hatch turns again and Vanzant comes out.
- When the Observation Dome exploded Karl doesn't die but is only hurt.
- An alternate ending where Karl reenters the ship and tries to destroy the isolation chamber with Vanzant and Evers. But before he can do this he is killed by the effects of the dimension jump. Another change is that Sweetie doesn't tell Evers that she is pregnant. Instead, Sweetie tells them that the supernova will not be sufficient to extinguish the combustion created by the alien object. It will extinguish after all available three-dimensional matter has been combusted (the entire universe) and will reach Earth within 257 years.

== Release ==
Supernova opened on January 14, 2000, in 2,280 theaters, during the Martin Luther King weekend, alongside Next Friday and the wide releases of Girl, Interrupted and The Hurricane.

== Reception ==
=== Box office ===
Before its release, MGM predicted that the film would not perform well at the box office. The film opened with $6.7 million over the four day Martin Luther King Jr. Weekend, ranking eighth at the US box office; by the end of its run, the film had grossed only $14.2 million in the United States and Canada and $598,000 in other territories, for a worldwide gross of $14.8 million. Against a budget of $90 million, the film was a box-office bomb, with an estimated loss of $83 million.

=== Critical response ===
On the review aggregator website Rotten Tomatoes, 12% of 66 critics' reviews are positive. The website's consensus reads: "This is an insult to the Sci-fi genre with no excitement and bad FX." Metacritic, which uses a weighted average, assigned the film a score of 19 out of 100, based on 19 critics, indicating "overwhelming dislike". Audiences polled by CinemaScore gave the film an average grade of "D" on an A+ to F scale.

The New York Times reviewer Lawrence Van Gelder called it "light on originality and low on suspense though high on design and special effects."

Film Comment praised Hill's directing and writing work for giving the action "an extraordinary vividness and sense of grim veracity", and touted the cinematography and visual effects, but strongly criticized Coppola and the cuts he made for weakening the characters and disconnecting the film's relationships and stylistic unity, resulting in the film being "consigned to the void".

== See also ==
- Sunshine (2007 film)

== Sources ==
- Bernstein, Abbie (2000). "Hill Over Troubled Waters". Fangoria. No. 190. pp. 36–39.
- Kutzera, Dale (February 2000). "Supernova". Cinefantastique. Vol. 31, no. 10. pp. 31–47.
- Shapiro, Marc (January 2000). "Solarluminary". Starlog. No. 270. pp. 90–93.
