= David C. Wilson (screenwriter) =

American screenwriter

David Campbell Wilson is an American screenwriter, probably best known for creating The Perfect Weapon and Supernova. He also credited for the screenplay of Terminator Salvation in early promotional material, but not for the final cut of the film.

Mr. Wilson has worked with many directors, among them Francis Ford Coppola, John McTiernan, and Walter Hill. Most recently, he wrote the screen story for Guy Ritchie's adaptation of The Man from U.N.C.L.E..

== Filmography ==
- The Perfect Weapon (1991)
- Supernova (2000)
- Terminator Salvation (2009) (uncredited)
- The Man from U.N.C.L.E. (2015) (co-story)
