= William Malone (director) =

American filmmaker (born 1947)

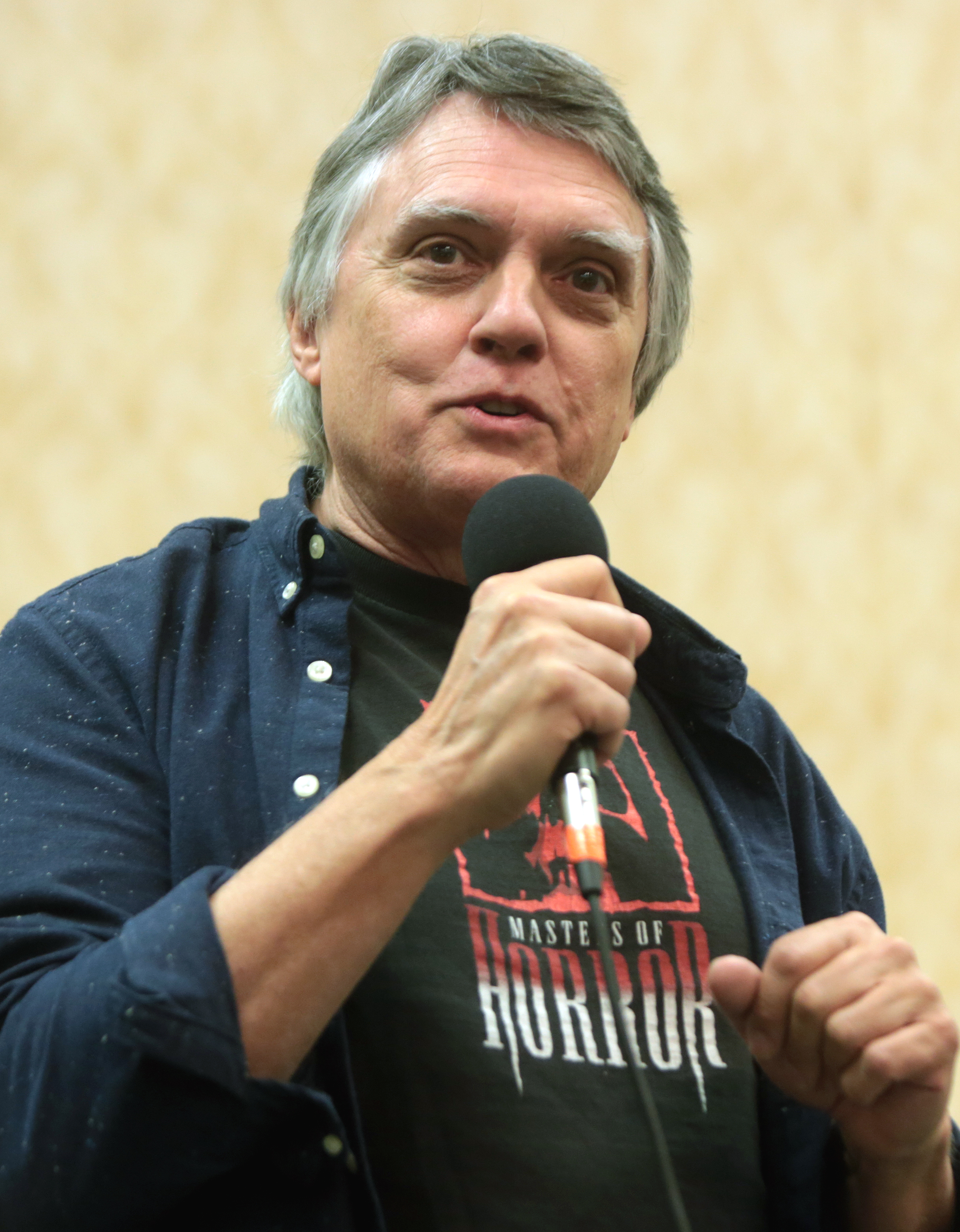
- Malone in 2016
- Born: April 4, 1947 (age 79); Lansing, Michigan, U.S.
- Education: UCLA School of Theater, Film and Television
- Occupations: Director, screenwriter, producer, special effects artist
- Years active: 1980–present
- Spouse: Carolyn Crawford (m. 2015)

William Malone (born May 4, 1947) is an American filmmaker, known for his work in horror genre.

== Early life and education ==
Malone was born and raised in Lansing, Michigan. He is of Irish and Ukrainian descent; his grandmother immigrated to the United States from Ukraine.

In high school, he played in a Beatles-inspired garage band called The Plagues. The band released several 45 rpm singles on their own label Quarantined Records and on Fenton Records, an independent record label (affiliated with Great Lakes Studios, in Sparta, MI).

Malone moved to California at age 19 to pursue a career in music. However, after a friend's encouragement, Malone found himself getting involved in film and working a job at Don Post Studios, doing makeup and costume work. He studied filmmaking at the UCLA School of Theater, Film and Television.

== Career ==
Malone made his directorial debut in with 1980's Scared to Death. In 1984, he directed the Alien-esque sci-fi horror Creature (a.k.a. The Titan Find), which was nominated for Best Horror Film at the 12th Saturn Awards. During the decade, he and artist H. R. Giger developed a script called Dead Star, described as "Hellraiser in Space", which was eventually heavily re-tooled and produced as Supernova (2000).

Malone directed episodes of horror television series like Freddy's Nightmares, Tales From The Crypt, and Perversions of Science. He was hired by Tales from the Crypt producers Robert Zemeckis and Joel Silver to direct the 1999 remake of House on Haunted Hill. The film opened at number one at the U.S. box office over the Halloween weekend, and became a commercial success. It was followed by a direct-to-video sequel in 2007, without Malone's involvement.

In 2002, Malone directed the internet-themed FeardotCom, which was critical and commercial failure, but has retrospectively gained a cult following. He directed an episode for the first season of the horror anthology series Masters of Horror, "Fair-Haired Child".

In 2008, he wrote and directed Parasomnia, which premiered at the Screamfest Horror Film Festival.

== Personal life ==
Malone is a well-known collector of Forbidden Planet memorabilia. He has been married to Carolyn Crawford since 2015.

== Filmography ==
=== Film ===
Year	Title	Contributed to				Notes
Year	Title	Director	Writer	Producer	Effects	Notes
1980	Scared to Death	Yes	Yes	Executive	Yes	Creature designer: "Synegor"
1984	Creature	Yes	Yes	Yes	No	
1999	House on Haunted Hill	Yes	No	No	No	
2002	FeardotCom	Yes	No	No	No	
2008	Parasomnia	Yes	Yes	Executive	Yes	

==== Writer only ====
- Universal Soldier: The Return (1999)
- Supernova (2000) - Story

==== Effects only ====
- Syngenor (1990) - Creature designer

==== Acting roles ====
- Hollywood Boulevard (1976) - Robby the Robot
- I Wanna Hold Your Hand (1978) - George Harrison
- Scared to Death (1980) - Alex Waverly
- Dead Country (2008) - William

=== Television ===
Year	Title	Notes
1988	Freddy's Nightmares	3 episodes
1993	Dark Justice	3 episodes
1995	New York Undercover	Episode: "Old Tyme Religion"
1995	Dream On	Episode: "Flight of the Pedalbee"
1994, 1996	Tales From The Crypt	Episodes: "Only Skin Deep", "Report from the Grave"
1995	W.E.I.R.D. World	TV movie
1997	Perversions of Science	Episode: "The Exile"
1997	The Big Easy	3 episodes
1997	Honey, I Shrunk the Kids: The TV Show	Episode: "Honey, I'm Haunted"
1998	Sleepwalkers	Episodes: "Counting Sheep", "Eye of the Beholder"
2000	The Others	Episode: "Eyes"
2006	Masters of Horror	Episode: "Fair-Haired Child"
