= Scared to Death (1980 film) =

- Promotional poster artwork
- Directed by: William Malone
- Written by: William Malone; Robert Short
- Produced by: Rand Marlis; Gilbert M. Shilton
- Starring: John Stinson
- Cinematography: Patrick Prince
- Edited by: Warren Chadwick
- Music by: Thomas Chase; Dell Hake
- Distributed by: Lone Star Pictures
- Release date: 1 December 1980
- Running time: 93 minutes
- Country: United States
- Language: English
- Budget: $74,000

Scared to Death (also known as The Aberdeen Experiment and Scared to Death: Syngenor) is a 1980 American science fiction horror film directed by William Malone and starring John Stinson.

== Plot ==
A bio-engineered creature called a Syngenor (which stands for SYNthesized GENetic ORganism) takes refuge in Los Angeles's sewer system, going into the streets at night in search of human spinal fluid. The police are stymied due to the lack of eyewitnesses and fingerprints, and consequently are ridiculed by the news media. They only link the cases by the killer's brutal feats of strength, such as ripping the door off a car and pulling on a victim's hair hard enough to break her neck. Ted Londergan, a former detective turned novelist, is repeatedly asked to look at the case by his former partner, Detective Lou Capell, but he refuses. Ted is far more interested in courting Jennifer Stanton, who he met by accidentally backing into her car. Jennifer is initially uninterested in his rude and eccentric personality, but is charmed by his persistence and has sex with him on their first date.

When Jennifer is attacked and left in a coma, Ted experiences a change of heart. A young woman named Sherry Carpenter comes forward and tells Ted that Jennifer's spinal fluid may have been drained by a Syngenor, which was created at a laboratory where she worked. Its creator, Dr. Ed Amberdine, worked on the project alone, so after he died no one continued to monitor the Syngenor. His notes indicate the Syngenor would be dangerous if allowed to reach maturity. Sherry says that the Syngenor's attacks usually take on the appearance of a brain tumor, so the body count has most likely been massively under-reported. The police chief closes the case, identifying a man killed in a shootout with police as the killer, seemingly in order to end the media embarrassment.

Ted and Sherry go to the laboratory to get Amberdine's notes and find a half-dead sewer maintenance worker. Realizing the sewer passages are the Syngenor's means of moving about without being seen, Ted and Sherry descend into the sewers, where they find the Syngenor's lair. Inside are a number of unconscious but still living humans attached to embryonic Syngenors by feeding tubes; the original Syngenor reproduced asexually to create the progeny. Ted shoots the embryos. Drawn by the sound of the gunshots, the adult Syngenor arrives. Ted shoots it but it proves to be bulletproof. He and Sherry flee up to a metal workshop. The shop's exits are all locked, so Ted decides to lure the Syngenor onto a drop forge instead of fleeing. However, the Syngenor catches him and attempts to drain his spinal fluid. Lou arrives and shoots the Syngenor, knocking it back onto the drop forge. Sherry then activates the machine, crushing the Syngenor. Jennifer awakens from her coma but has gone mad, experiencing hysteria and fearsome hallucinations.

== Cast ==
- John Stinson as Ted Lonergan
- Diana Davidson as Jennifer Stanton
- David Moses as Detective Lou Capell
- Toni Jannotta as Sherry Carpenter
- Walker Edmiston as Police Chief Dennis Warren
- Pamela Bowman as Janie Richter
- Mike Muscat as Howard Tindall (as Michael Muscat)

== Production ==
Wanting to become a director, Malone decided to make a monster movie because it was the type of film that could give a lot of production value for very little money. He also had experience with monster designs, having previously worked as a designer at a Halloween mask factory so that he could design the monster himself. To raise enough money for the film, Malone had to mortgage his house and sell most of his personal belongings (including his car). After raising enough money he began building and sculpting the monster suit. Inspired by H.R. Giger's design from the film Alien, he took three months to build the suit. During this process, he began casting the film and originally cast the actor and pop star Rick Springfield in the lead role. Springfield, however, called Malone the night before filming began saying he could not be in the film because he would miss too many acting classes. Malone then called the actor John Stinson, who he remembered from an improvisation class, and begged him to be in the film, to which he agreed. Filming began in February 1979 and the shoot lasted four weeks, a rather long time for a low-budget film.

Lone Star Pictures, a Texas-based company, provided $40,000 for the budget and picked up worldwide distribution. After the premier, the first sale made by Lone Star was to Malaysia for $90,000, putting the film into profit since it only cost $74,000 to make.

== Release ==
The film was first released by Lone Star Pictures International Inc. in all worldwide markets.

=== Home media ===
The film was released on VHS by Media Home Entertainment in the 1980s, and on DVD by Retromedia Entertainment in 2010. The title on the box art was changed to Scared to Death: Syngenor to show a connection to the film's 1990 sequel Syngenor.
