= Fair-Haired Child =

- Masters of Horror episode
- DVD cover for Fair Haired Child
- Episode no.: Season 1 Episode 9
- Directed by: William Malone
- Written by: Matt Greenberg
- Production code: 109
- Original air date: January 6, 2006

Guest appearances
- Lori Petty; Walter Phelan; Lindsay Pulsipher; William Samples

Episode chronology
← Previous "Cigarette Burns"	Next → "Sick Girl"

"Fair Haired Child" is the ninth episode of the first season of Masters of Horror. It originally aired in North America on January 6, 2006. A 15-year-old outcast named Tara is kidnapped by a strange couple and locked in a basement with their son who has a dark secret.

== Plot ==
Tara (Lindsay Pulsipher), though a pretty and talented teenage girl, is not liked at her school and has no friends. Upon returning home one day, she is kidnapped and drugged. She awakens in a mansion in the company of a woman in a nurse's outfit, and attempts to reach out to her mother through telephone, but the latter seems strangely unfazed by her daughter's plight. After the call disconnects, the "nurse" starts asking personally invasive questions, like whether Tara has been baptized or whether she ever had sexual intercourse in her life.

After Tara notices that she has been taken far away from home and tries to run away, the "nurse" (Lori Petty) and her male partner (William Samples) lock her inside the basement, where Tara finds a young boy (Jesse Haddock) hanging from a noose, close to death. She saves him, and the two form a bond. The boy, Johnny, is sweet and kind but cannot talk; he has to communicate by writing in the dust. With Johnny's assistance, Tara uncovers cryptic warnings on the walls, such as "Beware the Fair-Haired Child!" The two discover a room with numerous backpacks and a bloody bathtub, showing that they are not the first victims.

Johnny begins to undergo a transformation from a normal boy into a hideous demonic creature, the "Fair-Haired Child" (Walter Phelan). Frightened, Tara hides from the creature until it turns back into Johnny. It is revealed that twelve years ago, Johnny died by drowning on his fifteenth birthday in a pond near the mansion. Desperate over the loss of their son, Johnny's parents Anton and Judith (the kidnappers) made a deal with a demon, and performed a ritual that involves them providing a sacrifice of one virgin teenager (of the same age group as Johnny at the time of death) per year until the quota of twelve is reached. Tara is the last before Johnny can become human again, but Johnny is torn by his guilt over these sacrifices and has also come to care deeply for Tara. As he begins to transform again, instead of retreating, Tara embraces him until the "Fair-Haired Child" emerges and kills her.

Afterwards, Johnny's parents descend into the basement to find Tara's corpse covered in an old newspaper, with the words "I forgive you, Johnny," written on it in her blood. The couple then happily performs the final stage of the ritual, transforming Johnny back to his human self. Later, as they spend some time together, Johnny speaks for the first time, informing his parents that, in retaliation for Tara's death, he has struck a new deal with the demon: Instead of needing twelve souls to perform a resurrection, he has managed to narrow it down to two, and they don't have to be virgin teenagers. As Johnny smiles sadistically, Tara appears as a "Fair-Haired Child" and kills his parents.

Later, Tara, alive and well, awakes inside the mansion with a bandage on her arm. Johnny informs that he injected her with a medication to make her temporarily forget what had happened and soon afterwards, she will regain her past memory, including "some not pretty things". The two introduce themselves anew as he takes her for a stroll in the mansion's backyard towards the pond, walking past the graves of Johnny's parents in the garden.

== Reception ==
In Fervid Filmmaking, author Mike Watt wrote that "Fair-Haired Child" had a "surreal creature design a genuine chill-factor" that made it "amazingly creepy" despite its "convoluted" plot.
