= House on Haunted Hill (1999 film) =

1999 American supernatural horror film

- Theatrical release poster
- Directed by: William Malone
- Screenplay by: Dick Beebe
- Story by: Robb White
- Based on: House on Haunted Hill (1959 film) by Robb White
- Produced by: Robert Zemeckis; Joel Silver; Gilbert Adler; Michael K. Ross
- Starring: Geoffrey Rush; Famke Janssen; Taye Diggs; Ali Larter; Bridgette Wilson; Peter Gallagher; Chris Kattan
- Cinematography: Rick Bota
- Edited by: Anthony Adler
- Music by: Don Davis
- Production company: Dark Castle Entertainment
- Distributed by: Warner Bros.
- Release date: October 29, 1999
- Running time: 93 minutes
- Country: United States
- Language: English
- Budget: $19–$20 million
- Box office: $65 million

House on Haunted Hill is a 1999 American supernatural horror film directed by William Malone and starring Geoffrey Rush, Famke Janssen, Taye Diggs, Ali Larter, Bridgette Wilson, Peter Gallagher, and Chris Kattan. The plot follows a group of strangers who are invited to a party at an abandoned psychiatric hospital, where they are offered $1 million each by an amusement park mogul if they are able to survive the night. Produced by Robert Zemeckis and Joel Silver, it is a remake of the 1958 film directed by William Castle. The film marked the producing debut of Dark Castle Entertainment, a production company that went on to produce numerous other horror films, including additional remakes.

Screenwriter Dick Beebe adapted the film's script from Robb White's 1958 original, updating elements of the story and introducing a significant supernatural component which was absent from the original film. Filming took place in Los Angeles in early 1999, with famed make-up artists Gregory Nicotero and Dick Smith providing the film's special effects, the latter in his final film credit.

House on Haunted Hill was released on Halloween weekend in 1999. In the tradition of William Castle's theater gimmicks, Warner Bros. supplied promotional scratchcards to cinemas showing the film, offering ticket buyers a chance to win a money prize, similar to the movie's characters. The film was a commercial success, opening at number one at the U.S. box office, and grossing $65 million worldwide. It received largely negative reviews from critics, with some deriding its use of special effects and gore, though it did receive some praise for its performances and horror elements.

In 2007, the film was followed by a direct-to-DVD sequel, Return to House on Haunted Hill, which was released in both rated and unrated editions.

== Plot ==
In 1931 Los Angeles, the staff of the Vannacutt Psychiatric Institute for the Criminally Insane (headed by the sadistic Dr. Richard B. Vannacutt; a psychiatrist conducting cruel and torturous medical experiments) are under attack during a revolt by the patients. A fire erupts, killing Vannacutt, the inmates, and all but five of the staff.

In 1999, Evelyn Stockard-Price is in a disintegrating marriage with Stephen Price, an amusement park mogul known for his elaborate pranks. At Evelyn's insistence, Price stages her birthday party at the abandoned hospital, which has been partly converted into a residence. Five guests arrive: baseball player Eddie Baker; former television personality Melissa Marr; physician Donald Blackburn; Sara Wolfe, a production assistant impersonating her former boss, Jennifer; and Pritchett, the building's owner. The guests are not the ones Price invited and neither of the Prices know who they are. Despite this, Price continues the party's advertised theme, offering $1 million to each guest who remains in the house until morning; those who flee or perish forfeit their $1 million to the others.

The building's security system is tripped, locking everyone inside – a stunt which Price and Evelyn blame on each other. Sara, Eddie, and Pritchett search the labyrinthine basement for a control panel. Sara becomes separated from Eddie and is nearly pulled into a tank of blood by a doppelgänger impersonating him. Melissa disappears, leaving behind a trail of blood and a camcorder showing her apparent murder. Price visits his assistant Schechter, who is overseeing the party stunts, but finds him horribly mutilated. On the surveillance monitor he sees an apparition of Dr. Vannacutt armed with a bloody saw.

Evelyn seemingly dies in front of the others, strapped to an electroshock therapy table. Price pulls a gun on the guests, demanding to know who killed his wife, before they turn on him and lock him inside the "Saturation Chamber", an archaic zoetrope device that Vannacutt used to treat schizophrenics. Blackburn volunteers to guard Price. When the others leave, he turns the chamber on, leaving Price to be tortured by the moving images. In Vannacutt's office, Sara and Eddie find a portrait of the hospital's staff and realize that the Prices and invited party guests, with the exception of Blackburn, are descendants of the five survivors of the 1931 fire. Sara surmises that the spirits hacked Price's computer and altered the guest list.

Blackburn and Evelyn are revealed to be lovers who faked Evelyn's death, plotting to frame Price and hoping one of the guests will kill him in self-defense. Fearing the guests are not yet motivated to turn on Price, Evelyn kills Blackburn, then frees a delirious Price. Sara, Eddie, and Pritchett discover Evelyn's body is missing and return to the chamber, where they find Blackburn's decapitated corpse. After Sara shoots Price in the basement, Evelyn comes to gloat over his body, but Price, protected by a bulletproof vest and posing as dead, attacks her. As they scuffle, Evelyn is thrown through a decaying door, unleashing an evil, amorphous entity composed of the spirits of the house.

The shape-shifting entity consumes Evelyn, killing her and adding her spirit to its mass. Price then discovers Melissa's dismembered body. The entity pursues Price up the staircase before engulfing Pritchett. Price has a sudden realization that the attic might house the mechanisms used to operate the lockdown system and flees there, followed by Sara and Eddie. Price opens an iron window guard in the attic, then sacrifices himself to give the others time to flee. Sara narrowly escapes, but the entity traps Eddie inside.

As the entity menaces Eddie, he reveals he was adopted and, like Sara, not a descendent of the hospital staff. Pritchett's ghost opens the window guard, allowing Eddie to escape. Seated on the ledge, Eddie and Sara find an envelope containing all five checks, made out to cash and signed by Price. The two laugh hysterically before wondering how to get down from the ledge.

In a black-and-white post-credits scene, the spirits of the 1931 patients are seen torturing the Prices, presumably doomed to eternal damnation in the afterlife.

== Cast ==
- Geoffrey Rush as Stephen H. Price
- Famke Janssen as Evelyn Stockard-Price
- Taye Diggs as Eddie Baker
- Ali Larter as Sara Wolfe / 'Jennifer Jenzen'
- Bridgette Wilson as Melissa Margaret Marr
- Peter Gallagher as Donald W. Blackburn, M.D.
- Chris Kattan as Watson Pritchett
- Max Perlich as Carl Schecter
- Jeffrey Combs as Dr. Richard Benjamin Vannacutt

Additionally, Peter Graves makes a cameo appearance as himself, portraying the host of the Terrifying But True television program. Lisa Loeb and James Marsters appear as the Channel 3 news reporter and her cameraman, respectively. Slavitza Jovan and screenwriter Dick Beebe portray Vannacutt's ghostly nurses. Makeup effects artist Greg Nicotero appears as a rollercoaster technician.

Debi Mazar filmed scenes as the real Jennifer Jenzen, but these were deleted from the final film.

== Themes ==
Writing in Contemporary North American Film Directors (2002), academic Reynold Humphries cites House on Haunted Hill as stylistically harkening back to numerous horror and monster films of the 1930s, including Frankenstein (1931), Island of Lost Souls (1932), and The Old Dark House (also 1932), contrasted against the more graphic elements of contemporary horror films. Humphries concludes: "At the same time, the marked contrast seems to be a parody of postmodernism, where a play with form tends to eradicate context and history. The film itself... represents the return of the repressed of history in the monstrous form of the spirit of the insane, back to exact vengeance from the descendants of the families responsible for their torture. That art is not just a game for wealthy drones is an important theme of this effective, frightening, and decidedly nasty movie."

Academic Sharon Packer cites the film's inclusion of medical torture of the criminally insane as a prominent theme, citing its basis on real-life incidents, including human experiments conducted by the Nazis: "The backdrop of human experimentation that was once conducted in psychiatric asylums and in official Nazi medical experiments deserves attention, since these details are based on more than a kernel of truth. However, by including these scenes in a film about ghosts and supernatural visitations, the historical truth is softened, and the spectator may leave the movie theater convinced that allegations of unethical psychiatric experiments are just as unreal as the ghost story itself." However, Packer concedes that the film "pulls no punches" in its depictions of human medical experimentation.

== Production ==
=== Development ===
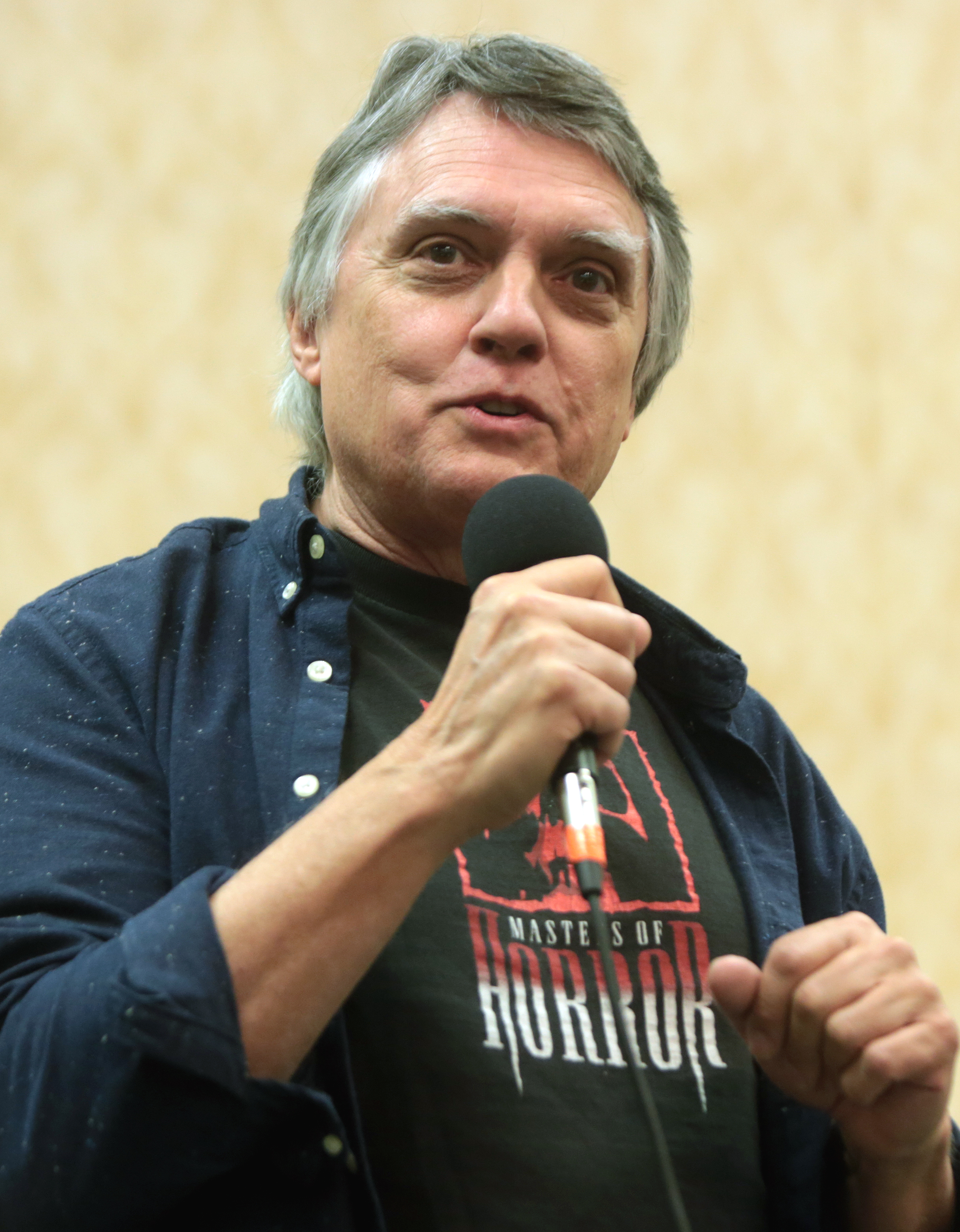
Though uncredited, director William Malone co-wrote the screenplay with Dick Beebe

House on Haunted Hill was the first film produced by American production company Dark Castle Entertainment, formed in 1998 by producers Joel Silver and Gilbert Adler, and filmmaker Robert Zemeckis. Silver and Zemeckis, collaborators on the Tales from the Crypt television series, had discussed remaking William Castle's 1958 film as early as 1997, with Zemeckis citing it among his favorite films.

Zemeckis proposed a remake of the film to Castle's daughter, Terry, who herself had already considered shopping a remake to film studios. However, her father had sold the rights to the film years prior in order to pay for her college tuition. In the intervening decades since the film's release, the rights had passed from Allied Artists to Lorimar before the latter's catalogue was absorbed by Warner Bros. "There were no ancillary rights," Castle said, "so I went to Warner Bros., which owns it now. They told me that Joel Silver and Robert Zemeckis had been talking about making a modern version of the picture." Terry Castle would ultimately serve as co-producer on the remake.

Director William Malone was also a fan of the original film, which he had seen as a child. He was hired by Silver and Zemeckis, after having directed episodes of Tales from the Crypt and its spinoff Perversions of Science. Malone and screenwriter Dick Beebe developed a screenplay over a period of a year and a half, based on the original by Robb White.

According to Malone, he wrote approximately twenty percent of the screenplay, though he did not take a writing credit on it. Co-producer Adler noted that he felt the film was "totally different" from the original, but retained its spirit in terms of "how we're telling the story, and the basic tenets of the story itself. We contemporize it as much as possible." The unethical psychiatry methods and experimental procedures featured in the film were loosely based on medical experiments conducted by the Nazis.

Unlike in the 1958 film, in which a supernatural element was only hinted at (and ultimately revealed to be a ruse), the reality of paranormal forces attacking the party attendees was made explicit in Beebe's screenplay.

=== Casting ===
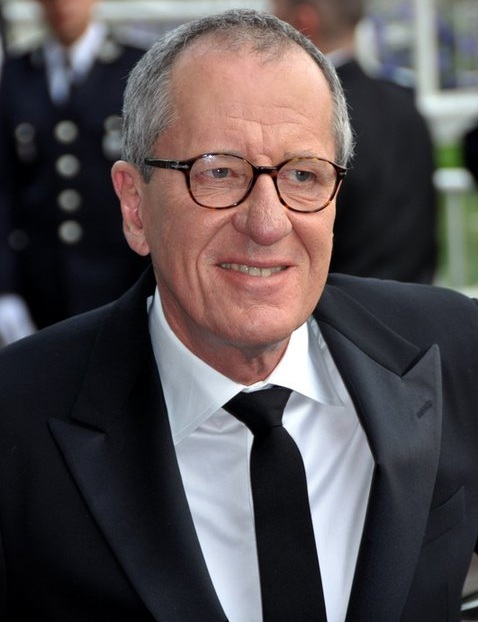
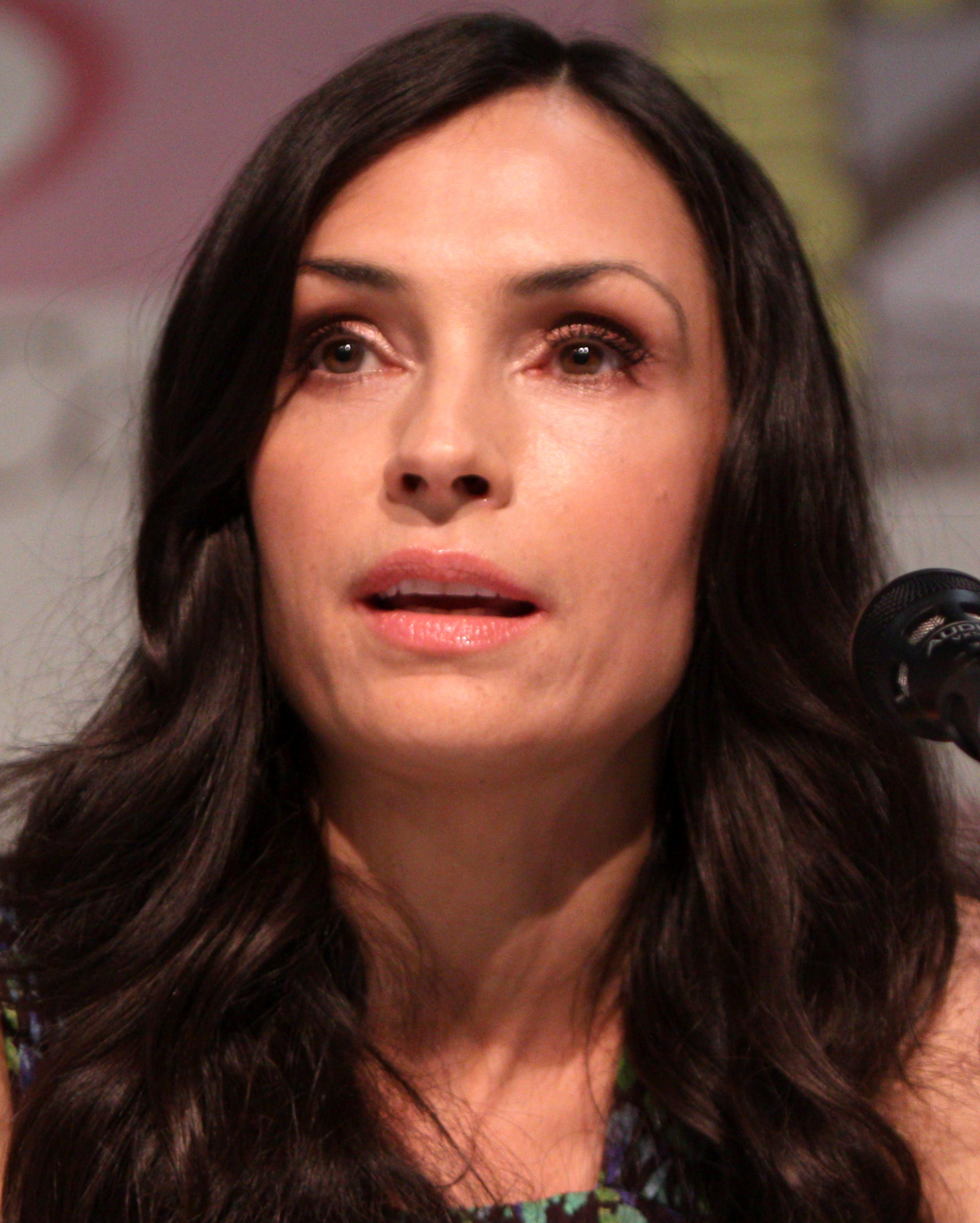
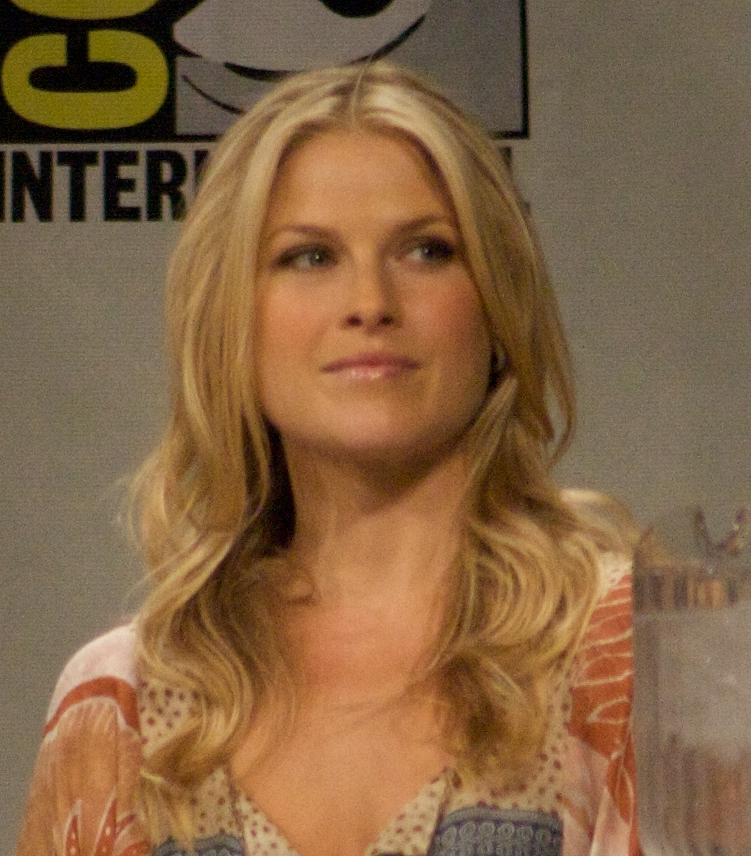
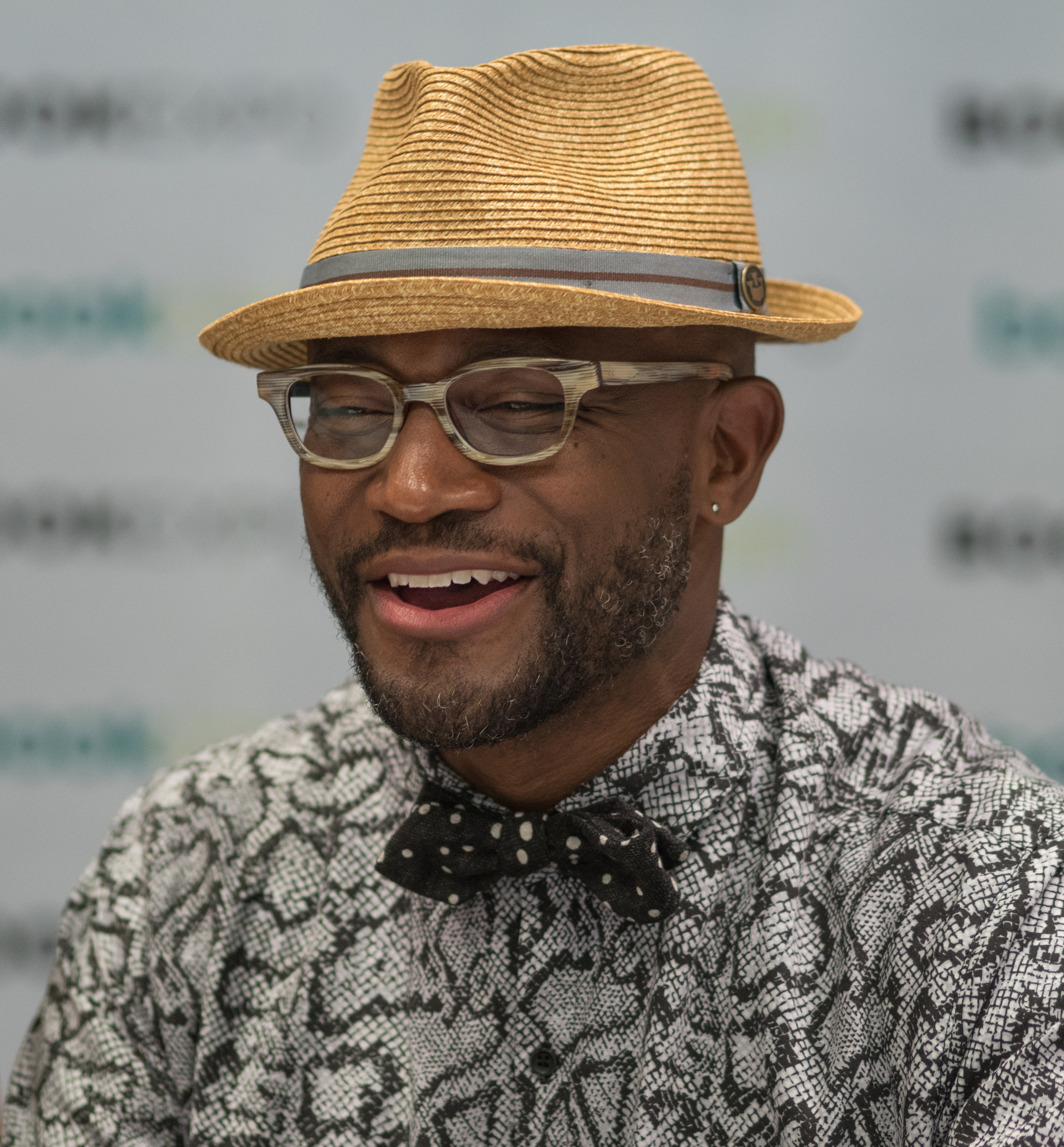
The film's principal cast (clockwise from top left: Geoffrey Rush, Famke Janssen, Taye Diggs, and Ali Larter)

Geoffrey Rush signed on to appear as Steven Price, the theme park mogul in the film. The Price character name, as well as some of the character's overall personality and mannerisms, are references to actor Vincent Price, who portrayed the same character—named "Frederick Loren"—in the original film. Malone stated that Rush was committed to the material and took the role seriously. Rush modeled the look of the character after film director John Waters, wearing a distinct pencil moustache, and avoided watching the original film as he did not want his portrayal to be influenced by Vincent Price's performance. Elizabeth Hurley was initially considered for the role of Evelyn Price, but by February 1999, Famke Janssen was ultimately cast in the part.

Taye Diggs was subsequently cast as Eddie, the ex-professional baseball player attending the party, and agreed to appear in the film after Rush signed onto the project. Ali Larter, who had previously completed Varsity Blues (1999), was cast as Sara Wolfe, a woman who poses as her ex-boss, film executive Jennifer Jensen; the film marked Larter's third screen appearance. Commenting on Diggs' and Larter's casting, producer Gil Adler said: "When you are watching a horror film, you want to root for someone you can sympathize with. Taye and Ali have the charm and wit to be able to pull those emotions from the audience with their performances."

Saturday Night Live star Chris Kattan was cast as Watson Pritchett, the caretaker of the building. Terry Castle stated that Kattan was cast in the part for the sake of comic relief, and that the filmmakers allowed Kattan to "just [be] who he is." Bridgette Wilson was cast in the role of Melissa Marr, a disgraced television host, and was chosen by Malone who appreciated her comic timing, likening her to a "living Warner Bros. cartoon [character]." In casting Peter Gallagher as Donald Blackburn, a duplicitous physician, Malone commented that he brought "an evil quality" portraying "a guy who is something completely different than what he initially seems."

For the role of Dr. Vannacutt, the deranged head doctor of the hospital, singer Marilyn Manson was at one point considered, but Jeffrey Combs was ultimately cast in the part. Peter Graves appears in the film as himself, hosting a fictionalized television segment on the Vannacutt Institute's history, while Lisa Loeb and James Marsters have minor parts as news reporters visiting Price's amusement park.

=== Filming ===
Principal photography began in Los Angeles on January 28, 1999, with exteriors of the house's driveway being shot in Griffith Park near the Griffith Park Observatory.

The hospital's exterior and interiors were designed by David Klassen, who based its appearance on the monolithic style of Albert Speer, an architect who designed buildings for Nazi Germany. Adler commented on the unorthodox nature of the house: "Instead of being a typical sort of haunted house, this [one] is much more modern, with a touch of Deco. It's not what you'd expect to see." Larter stated in an on-set interview: "The set is dark and dirty, and everyone's been sick, and [Taye Diggs] and Chris [Kattan] keep me laughing. We really have had a good time." The exterior shots of the house perched on the cliffside were achieved by a specially-designed 7-foot (2.1 m) miniature. In order to achieve the illusion of the guests approaching the home's entrance, a still image of the miniature was matted with footage of the actors ascending the driveway.

The "Terror Incognita" roller coaster at Price's amusement park featured in the beginning of the film is actually The Incredible Hulk Coaster at Universal Islands of Adventure theme park at Universal Orlando Resort in Florida. Prior to securing The Incredible Hulk Coaster, the production had considered using the Rampage rollercoaster at VisionLand in Birmingham, Alabama.

The film was shot by cinematographer Rick Bota on 35 mm film stock, the negatives of which director Malone flashed in order to reduce the contrast of the picture, giving it a visual appearance similar to the film stock used in the early 20th century.

=== Visual effects ===
The surrealist effects featured in the film's climax were inspired by H. P. Lovecraft and Rorschach inkblots

Some reviewers noted that the surrealistic jerking, twitching effect of the ghosts featured in the film was similar to the effects in Adrian Lyne's film Jacob's Ladder (1990). The special effects in the film were designed by Gregory Nicotero and Robert Kurtzman, with additional makeup design by Dick Smith in his last film credit. One of the monster figures featured in the film during Price's underwater hallucination sequence was a creation of Smith's that was intended to be used in Ghost Story (1981) but was ultimately not featured. Malone, struck by the appearance of the figure—which consisted of an eyeless, noseless human head with an enlarged mouth—was granted permission from Smith to use it in the film.

The tentacular morphing mass of ghosts featured at the film's climax, designed by KNB EFX Group and supervised by Robert Skotak, was inspired by the visual descriptions of monsters in H. P. Lovecraft's novels, as well as Rorschach inkblots used in psychiatry. According to Malone, most of the visual elements were not computer-generated, and were made up of footage and photographs shot by the production crew, which were grafted together to form the mass. Various human models were photographed for its design, as well as twisted layers of fabric, wire, and other physical materials. Skotak estimated that the final design was assembled from at least "a hundred different elements, maybe more than that.

The sequence in which Evelyn is subsumed by the mass and rapidly decomposes before melting into it was accomplished via a mixture of practical and digital effects. A blank styrofoam dummy head was crafted, onto which warped footage of actress Famke Janssen's face was projected. The prop head was filled with painted foam and cotton candy (mimicking the appearance of brain tissue) and then dissolved with acetone.

Late into the design process, Zemeckis proposed the notion of the spectral mass revealing the faces of the victims it had claimed. This required the crew to shoot additional footage of several actors, including Janssen, Wilson, and Rush. Because Rush had already completed filming and left Los Angeles, this footage of his face was filmed by a different crew in London.

Other practical visual effects included the use of a spinning saw blade being held in front of a camera lens to achieve a fluttering look to the hallucinatory sequences experienced by Price in the Saturation Chamber.

=== Post-production ===
Sound editor Dane Davis, who had at the time recently completed work on The Matrix (1999), served as the film's sound editor in post-production. According to Davis, House on Haunted Hill was among the first feature films to "use a completely virtual mix. Using some brand-new software, I was able to capture and create sounds, combine special effects, music, dialogue and background, and keep the entire mix in the computer where each element could be manipulated. I could change the relationship between sounds, or control the timbre and intensity of a particular sound right up until the movie was ready to be locked into a final print."

Several key scenes were excised from the final cut of the film during post-production. This included an exposition scene showing how Sara came to receive an invitation to the party: While working as a production assistant on a film set, Sara is fired by her boss, Jennifer Jenzen (played by Debi Mazar), the feisty vice president of a motion picture company. Two versions of the scene were shot, during which Sara hands Jennifer a bag delivered for her; inside is a music box with a jack-in-a-box-trigger which cuts the handler's finger. Jennifer throws the box in the garbage, and Sara discovers the invitation to Price's party inside of it.

Another scene removed from the film last-minute, according to director Malone, was a scene in which Sara falls through a collapsing floor when she and Baker are being chased by The Darkness. After falling two stories below, Wolfe awakens in a subterranean crematorium filled with the ashes and corpses of the hospital's dead patients. There, she is attacked by reanimated corpses who rise out of the ashes, terrorizing her and tearing off her overcoat. As a result of the scene's removal, there remains a continuity error in the final cut of the film, in which Wolfe's overcoat disappears from her body in-between scenes.

A final epilogue scene completing the Jennifer Jenzen story arc was also filmed, featuring Jennifer arriving at the house with a realtor, which she is to inherit. As she enters the front door, a bloodcurdling scream is heard, and the realtor is revealed to be Dr. Vannacutt. Director Malone said the scene ultimately was removed after the cutting of Jenzen's exposition scene, as well as for having a comical tone that did not fit with the rest of the film.

All three deleted scenes from the film were included on the 2000 Warner Bros. Home Video release of the film on DVD in the bonus features section.

== Music ==
House On Haunted Hill

Film score by Don Davis
- Released: November 2, 1999
- Genres: Soundtracks; Film scores
- Length: 54:01
- Label: Varèse Sarabande

The soundtrack for the film was commercially released on the label Varèse Sarabande, containing selections from the original score by Don Davis. Davis composed the film score and recorded it with an orchestra in a Seattle church. In order to lend the score a gothic quality, Davis intended to implement a pipe organ, but due to budgetary reasons instead used sampled organ pieces.

Track listing

1. Main Title
2. Pencil Neck
3. Hans Verbosemann
4. House Humongous
5. Funky Old House (Johannes Brahms)
6. No Exit
7. Gun Control
8. Surprise
9. Price Pestiferous
10. Misty Misogamy
11. Coagulatory Calamity
12. Melissa in Wonderland
13. Sorry, Tulip
14. Struggling to Escape
15. Soirée a Saturation
16. On the House
17. Dead But Nice
18. Blackburn's Surprise
19. Encountering Mr. Blackburn
20. The Price Petard
21. Epiphanic Evelyn
22. The Corpus Delecti Committee Meeting
23. Price in Perpetuity
24. The Beast with the Least

The song "Sweet Dreams (Are Made of This)" by Marilyn Manson is not on the soundtrack but plays during the scene lead up to the Asylum and end credits.

== Release ==
=== Marketing ===
In keeping with William Castle's tradition of releasing each of his films with a prominent marketing gimmick, Warner Bros. and Dark Castle supplied movie theaters with scratch-off tickets that would be given to moviegoers. The scratch-off tickets gave each patron a chance to win a cash prize, like the characters in the film. The cash prizes totaled $1 million, including movie rental vouchers from Blockbuster. Additionally, the film's official website featured an Adobe Flash game titled Escape from House on Haunted Hill, in which players attempt to escape the Vannacutt Institute while being pursued by the ghost of Dr. Vannacutt.

Dark Castle had originally intended to release each of their films with a gimmick much like Castle had done. The studio considered releasing their subsequent remake of Thirteen Ghosts (2001) in 3-D with special glasses similar to the ones used by the characters in the film. These plans were scrapped and House on Haunted Hill remains the only film released with a special marketing gimmick.

=== Theatrical run ===
House on Haunted Hill premiered in Los Angeles on October 27, 1999, at the Mann Village Theater. Janssen, Kattan, Larter and Wilson were in attendance with director Malone, as well as producers Silver and Adler. The film was given a wide theatrical release in North America two days later, on October 29, 1999, opening on 2,710 screens.

=== Home media ===
Warner Home Video released House on Haunted Hill on VHS and a special edition DVD in April 2000. In 2006, Warner reissued it as part of a double feature DVD paired with the original 1958 film.

On October 9, 2018, Scream Factory released the film on Blu-ray for the first time in North America as a collector's edition featuring new interviews with Malone and other crew, among various other features.

== Reception ==
=== Box office ===
House on Haunted Hill opened at number one at the U.S. box office over the Halloween weekend, earning over $15 million in ticket sales. Its North American theatrical exhibition lasted 61 weeks. By the end of its theatrical run, the film had a domestic gross of $40,846,082 and an international gross of $24,244,459, for a total of $65,090,541 worldwide.

=== Critical response ===
House on Haunted Hill received generally negative reviews from critics, and was often compared to Jan de Bont's The Haunting, another remake of a 1963 film released several months prior; both films focused on a group of strangers staying in a haunted house. (Note: Noted in multiple critical reviews.) On the review aggregator website Rotten Tomatoes, 31% of 62 critics' reviews are positive, with an average rating of 4.7/10. The website's consensus reads: "Unsophisticated and unoriginal film fails to produce scares." Metacritic, which uses a weighted average, assigned the film a score of 28 out of 100, based on 17 critics, indicating "generally unfavorable" reviews. Audiences polled by CinemaScore gave an average grade of "C" on an A+ to F scale.

Mick LaSalle of the San Francisco Chronicle wrote, "House on Haunted Hill is the kind of horror movie that's not a bit scary and quite a bit gross. Yet it's also mildly, even pleasantly, entertaining, at least by the diminished standard set by this summer's The Haunting ... [it] sets up hostile relationships between the characters, which allows the audience to wonder who is doing what to whom. Finding out is not so interesting, but getting there isn't so bad." Maitland McDonough of Film Journal gave the film a similar review, saying "The proceedings are all utterly conventional, but watching them unfold is mildly diverting if you're in the right frame of mind, as many moviegoers apparently were over the Halloween weekend," also favorably comparing the film to Jan de Bont's remake of The Haunting.

Kim Newman, writing for Sight and Sound, praised the "try-anything approach of writer-director William Malone" and observed that the film "manages to respect the original's intentions far more than such recent remakes as the 1999 versions of The Mummy and The Haunting... The mix of laughs, shocks and gruesomeness is much the same as in the two Tales from the Crypt movies, but Malone coaxes a slightly fresher flavour, taking on board the influence of David Fincher and even Lars von Trier."

Eric Harrison of the Los Angeles Times praised the performances in the film, particularly those of Rush, Kattan, and Larter, but felt that the screenplay's tone was inconsistent, writing: "Humans do so many horrible things to each other in House on Haunted Hill that the ghosts don't stand a chance of keeping up, which may explain why the script makes such nitwits of the characters—if the spooks are going to make an impression, they need all the help they can get." Entertainment Weekly's Owen Gleiberman gave the film a B− rating, calling it "trash, but creepier than you expect." Joe Leydon of Variety gave the film a favorable review, noting its "cheap scares," but adding: "Given the irredeemable cheesiness of the original 1958 House on Haunted Hill, the makers of the remake had nowhere to go but up. So it's not exactly a stunning surprise to find the new horror opus is a slicker and scarier piece of work."

Lawrence Van Gelder of The New York Times called the film "a sorry reincarnation" of the original, adding: "This film wastes the talents of actors like Geoffrey Rush and Peter Gallagher in hollow roles and relies heavily on its sets and special effects to do the work that should have been accomplished by its director and writer." The Austin Chronicle's Marc Savlov echoed a similar sentiment, writing: "The nicest thing I can say about this remake of William Castle's 1958 shocker is that Geoffrey Rush, god bless him, sure can do a fine imitation of Vincent Price's original mustache, even better than John Waters's–which is no mean feat."

=== Accolades ===
Award/association	Year	Category	Recipient(s)	Result	Ref.
Blockbuster Entertainment Awards	2000	Favorite Supporting Actor – Horror	Taye Diggs	Won	
Blockbuster Entertainment Awards	2000	Favorite Supporting Actress – Horror	Famke Janssen	Nominated	
Fangoria Chainsaw Awards	2000	Best Supporting Actress	Famke Janssen	Nominated	
Golden Trailer Awards	2001	Golden Trailer	House on Haunted Hill	Nominated	
Stinkers Bad Movie Awards	1999	Worst Remake	House on Haunted Hill	Nominated	

== Sequel ==
In 2007, the film was followed up with a direct-to-DVD sequel, Return to House on Haunted Hill, with Jeffrey Combs reprising his role as Vannacut and was released in both rated and unrated editions.

The film had no involvement from William Malone and received poor reviews, mainly due to plot holes, continuity in the building design and various other features of the film, but it was praised for its state-of-the-art Blu-Ray feature in which the viewer can change the path of the story.

== See also ==
- List of ghost films

== Sources ==
- Burke, Michael (2024). The Ethics of Horror: Spectral Alterity in Twenty-First-Century Horror Film. Lanham, Maryland: Lexington Books. ISBN 978-1-666-91085-8.
- Eby, Douglas (December 1999). "House on Haunted Hill". Cinefantastique. Vol. 31, no. 9. pp. 8–11. ISSN 0145-6032.
- Greenberg, Bruce Stuart (2000). Tale of Two Houses. House on Haunted Hill (DVD documentary short). Warner Bros. Home Entertainment. OCLC 44485940.
- Humphries, Reynold (2002). Allon, Yoram; Cullen, Del; Patterson, Hannah (eds.). Contemporary North American Film Directors. A Wallflower Critical Guide (Second ed.). London, England: Wallflower Press. ISBN 978-1-903-36452-9.
- Kane, Paul; O'Regan, Marie (2014). Voices in the Dark: Interviews with Horror Writers, Directors and Actors. Jefferson, North Carolina: McFarland & Company. ISBN 978-0-786-45672-7.
- Meehan, Paul (2019). The Haunted House on Film: An Historical Analysis. Jefferson, North Carolina: McFarland & Company. ISBN 978-1-476-63820-1.
- Newman, Kim (2011). Nightmare Movies: Horror on Screen Since the 1960s. London, England: Bloomsbury. p. 414. ISBN 978-1-408-80503-9.
- Nowlan, Robert A.; Nowlan, Gwendolyn L. (2001). The Films of the Nineties. Jefferson, North Carolina: McFarland & Company. ISBN 978-0-786-40974-7.
- Packer, Sharon (2007). Movies and the Modern Psyche. New York City, New York: Bloomsbury. ISBN 978-0-275-99359-7.
- Packer, Sharon (2012). Cinema's Sinister Psychiatrists: From Caligari to Hannibal. Jefferson, North Carolina: McFarland & Company. ISBN 978-0-786-46390-9.
