= Return to House on Haunted Hill =

- DVD cover
- Directed by: Víctor Garcia
- Written by: William Massa
- Based on: Characters by Robb White
- Produced by: Steve Richards; Erik Olsen; Jonathan Tzachor; Roee Sharon
- Starring: Amanda Righetti; Cerina Vincent; Erik Palladino; Tom Riley; Andrew Lee Potts; Jeffrey Combs
- Cinematography: Lorenzo Senatore
- Edited by: Robert Malina
- Music by: Frederik Wiedmann
- Production companies: Dark Castle Home Entertainment; BUFO
- Distributed by: Warner Bros. Pictures (Note: Released under the Warner Premiere label.)
- Release dates: October 9, 2007 (Sitges Film Festival); October 16, 2007 (United States)
- Running time: 79 minutes 81 minutes (unrated version)
- Country: United States
- Language: English

Return to House on Haunted Hill is a 2007 American horror film and the sequel to the 1999 film House on Haunted Hill. Directed by Víctor Garcia and written by William Massa, the film stars Amanda Righetti, Tom Riley, Cerina Vincent and Erik Palladino. The film follows Ariel Wolfe — younger sister of Sara Wolfe, a character from the previous film — being forced by a group of people to search for a mysterious idol hidden inside an abandoned and haunted psychiatric asylum.

The film was released straight-to-video on October 16, 2007 on DVD, Blu-ray, and HD DVD formats.

== Plot ==
Ariel Wolfe is the younger sister of Sara Wolfe, a survivor of a birthday event eight years ago in the Vannacutt Psychiatric Institute for the Criminally Insane, which at that time had been abandoned and later converted into a private residence— but has since been abandoned yet again. In the 1930s, the asylum was overseen by the sadistic psychiatrist Dr. Richard B. Vannacutt. Sara claimed that the ghosts of the house residents killed the party guests, and later committed suicide.

Ariel and her friend Paul are kidnapped by an art dealer, Desmond Niles. Ariel realises that Sara did not commit suicide: Desmond killed her. Desmond forces Ariel to help him find an artifact located inside the old Vannacutt Psychiatric Institute, a figurine of the demon Baphomet. Inside the building, they encounter Dr. Richard Hammer and his assistants, Kyle and Michelle, revealing that Michelle has been on Niles' team the whole time, betraying Hammer all along.

Ariel explains that the building has been rigged to keep everyone inside for at least 12 hours. The group splits up to search for the idol. Desmond's henchmen are killed by the inmate ghosts, having visions of the patients there suffering the same deaths as them. A ghost shows Ariel the depravity the inmates suffered under Dr. Vannacutt. These images reveal that Vannacutt was driven mad by the idol and performed experiments on the mentally ill. The inmates led a revolt against Vannacutt, during which the sanatorium burned down. (Note: As depicted in House on Haunted Hill (1999).) The deaths in the previous film were assumed to be caused by the ghosts. But now Ariel is shown that the idol actually forces the dead to do Vannacutt's bidding and did not willingly kill.

Although the 12 hours are up, the master locking mechanism begins to lock the house down again. Ariel escapes but discovers that Paul has entered the house to look for her, and goes back inside. Convinced Michelle wants the idol for herself, Desmond attempts to kill her. Michelle, however, is killed by Vannacutt. The rest of the group discovers a way out of the asylum, but it is blocked by iron bars. The ghost of an inmate shows Ariel that the idol is in the asylum's basement, or crematorium.

Ariel, Paul, and Dr. Hammer descend to the crematorium and discover the "heart of the house," composed of living flesh. Ariel tries to destroy the idol, but it is indestructible. She then reasons that if it is flushed down the sewer and leaves the building, the spirits will be freed. The team is ambushed by Desmond, who wants the idol. The ghosts seize Desmond and burn him alive after he has a vision about a patient dying a similar death. The idol's evil overcomes Dr. Hammer and tries to strangle Ariel. The ghost of Vannacutt and the inmates appear, Vannacutt hoping one of them will die in the fight. Hammer recovers his senses, but Dr. Vannacutt kills him. Ariel throws the idol into the sewer. The spirits vanish, and several attack Dr. Vannacutt, tearing him apart. The building comes unsealed, and Ariel and Paul leave.

In a post-credits scene, a man and woman are about to have sex on a beach. The woman feels something under the sand. They dig and pull the Baphomet idol into the light.

== Cast ==
- Amanda Righetti as Ariel Wolfe
- Cerina Vincent as Michelle
- Erik Palladino as Desmond Niles
- Tom Riley as Paul
- Andrew Lee Potts as Kyle
- Steven Pacey as Dr. Richard Hammer
- Jeffrey Combs as Dr. Richard B. Vannacutt
- Kalita Rainford as Harue
- Gil Kolirin as Norris Boz
- Andrew Pleavin as Samuel
- Chucky Venice as Warren Jackson
- Stilyana Mitkova as Ghost of Sara Wolfe

== Production ==
Dark Castle Entertainment announced it would produce a sequel to House on Haunted Hill (1999) in August 2006, and said it had cast Amanda Righetti in the lead at the same time. In June 2007, Warner Bros. agreed to co-fund the sequel under its Warner Premiere brand, a subdivision of the studio that focuses on direct-to-DVD releases and other digital media. The picture was filmed using high-definition digital media, and contains an extra feature dubbed Navigational Cinema, an interactive film with a "choose your own adventure" concept which permits viewers to manipulate up to seven aspects of the story line to create 96 different versions of the film. Actor Jeffrey Combs said that the script did not contain the "navigational branching" scenes, and director Victor Garcia admitted that these script changes did not arrive until the start of principal photography.

Return to House on Haunted Hill was the feature film directorial debut for Victor Garcia, who had previously helmed a single short film. It was also the first screenplay credit for writer William Massa. Filming occurred in Sofia, Bulgaria.

== Release ==
Warner Bros. and Dark Castle released the film for DVD, on October 16, 2007. In the United States, Warner Premiere released an unrated version with the Navigational Cinema technology, as well as an R-rated version that did not.

The unrated U.S. release did not contain any interviews, commentaries, or "making of" featurettes, but did include four deleted scenes; a music video for the Mushroomhead song "Simple Survival" (featured on the film's soundtrack); and about 20 minutes of in-character interviews with the leads, which recapped the film's plot or provided limited backstory. Many of the Navigational Cinema features led to scene choices which included more nudity or gore, but only one choice materially changed the outcome of the story. An additional 60 minutes of video were shot to incorporate these choices.

== Reception ==
The film holds a 43% approval rating on Rotten Tomatoes based on seven reviews. A review in Wired declared the plot and script to be atrocious, saying, "For some reason, the sequel throws in a mysterious idol as the cause of [Vannacutt's] Inherent Evil. Ugh. It's an impossibly contrived reason to get people back in the house, and the subplots about suicides and gangsters, is particularly out of place. The gore factor is adequate, but you won't actually care about anyone who's dying, making this a horrendous waste of time." The Web site DVD Talk called the story a "retread", the characters "thinly-written", and the plot device of the Baphomet idol "completely arbitrary". However, some reviews felt the viewer ability to select alternative plots was intriguing and fun.

== Cancelled sequel ==
A third installment in the series had been planned, but poor DVD sales for Return to House on Haunted Hill led Dark Castle to cancel these plans in October 2010.
