= Last of the Garage Punk Unknowns, Volumes 7 & 8: Heartbroken American Garage Jangle Misery 1965–1967 =

Last of the Garage Punk Unknowns, Volumes 7 & 8

Compilation album
- Released: March 25, 2015
- Recorded: 1960s
- Genres: Garage rock; folk rock; psychedelic
- Length: 1:19:12
- Label: Crypt

Last of the Garage Punk Unknowns, Volumes 7 & 8: Heartbroken American Garage Jangle Misery 1965–1967 is a compilation album of 1960s garage rock available on compact disc and is part of the Last of the Garage Punk Unknowns series created and compiled by Tim Warren for Crypt Records. It was released and 2015 and combines volumes 7 and 8 of the LP counterparts in the series. Most of the set focuses on downcast and moody rock songs and ballads. Several of the tracks display folk rock influence. Packaging includes detailed liner notes that include basic information about each song and group, such as origin and recording date. The album also includes photographs of musical groups, and cover artwork reflects the mid-1960s style graphic art popular on record sleeves of the time.

The set opens with "Time Remains" by the Nomads, from Eunice, Louisiana. The Pulsating Heartbeats follow with "Anne". The brooding "Without You" is by the Kings Ransom from Allentown, Pennsylvania, and was previously included on the Allentown Anglophile compilation put out by Distortions records. The Other Side (not to be confused with the San Francisco band of the same name) does a rendition of the Shadows of Knight's "Dark Side". Other highlights in the set are "Always Lies" by We the People, from Boston, Massachusetts, which features a screaming vocal by Peter Weeple, "The Way of the Down", by the Saxons, and "Living with the Birds", by the New Rumley Invincibles. The set closes with "Why Oh Why", by the Squires.

== Track listing ==
1. The Nomads: "Time Remains" – 2:08
2. The Pulsating Heartbeats: "Anne" – 2:46
3. The Gremlins: "Everybody Needs a Love" – 2:13
4. The Last Image: "She's on My Mind" – 2:46
5. The Plastic Menagerie: "Tryin' to Come Back" – 2:52
6. The Glass Menagerie: ""Natasha" – 2:35
7. The French Church: "Without Crying" – 1:33
8. Prince & The Paupers: "What More Can I Say" – 2:54
9. The Kings Ransom: "Without You" – 3:47
10. The Timetakers: "Don't Turn Away" – 2:51
11. The Stratacasters: "Can't Go on Without You" – 2:32
12. The Pastels: "What Can I Say?" – 3:31
13. The Shakles: "Just Looking for You" – 2:25
14. The Scurvy Knaves: "Gypsy Baby" – 2:33
15. The New Rumley Invincibles: "Living With the Birds" – 2:13
16. The Other Side: "Dark Side" – 2:03
17. The Pastels: "How Many Nights" – 3:04
18. The Toads: "Stay Away" – 2:46
19. The Henchmen: "She Still Loves You" – 1:58
20. The Night Walkers: "Stix and Stones" – 2:11
21. The Timetakers: "Love Me Like You Did Before" – 2:24
22. The Night Riders: "She Won't Miss You" – 3:30
23. The White Angels: "But He Never Comes Back" – 1:57
24. We the People (Boston, MA): "Always Lies" – 2:28
25. The Dominions: "I Need Her" – 2:50
26. The Saxons: "The Way of the Down" – 2:47
27. The Sonics (a.k.a. Sonics Inc.): "You Don't Hear Me" – 3:06
28. The Mystics: "Orphan" – 3:06
29. The Vacant Lots: "Hey Baby" – 3:05
30. The Squires: "Why Oh Why" – 2:18

== See also ==
- Crypt Records
- Back from the Grave (series)
- List of garage rock bands
- Garage rock

== Bibliography ==
- Markesich, Mike (2012). Teenbeat Mayhem (1st ed.). Branford, Connecticut: Priceless Info Press. ISBN 978-0-985-64825-1.
