= Scream Loud!!! The Fenton Story =

Compilation album
- Released: January 23, 2007
- Recorded: 1960s
- Genre: Garage rock; folk rock; psychedelic
- Length: 2:28:47
- Label: Way Back

Scream Loud!!! The Fenton Story is a garage rock compilation consisting of songs released by Fenton Records in Grand Rapids, Michigan and the assorted vanity labels that it had pressed and distributed for various regional acts, primarily from western Michigan in the 1960s, and is available on identical LP and CD formats.* The set focuses on basic upbeat and rocking material, but includes a couple of odd and more eclectic expetions. Fenton's founder was musician and entrepreneur Dave Kalmbach, who intended the label to be a place where un-established groups could have a place to record on either the Fenton label itself or on their own vanity labels, which were usually given special custom names chosen by the bands and their management, often under the arrangement that the bands would pay themselves for most of the recording and pressing costs, but receive a certain share in royalties. Commenting on how these recordings more-or-less function as aural snapshots taken from the bygone scrapbook of a more innocent time, Stephen Thomas Earlewine commented:

They preserve a whole gaggle of bands that were bashing out three chords for the love of the music with little hope of hitting the big time. As such, the double-disc/triple-LP set Scream Loud!! The Fenton Story -- a collection of these rare, collector-cherished 45s assembled by those very same collectors -- almost functions as a piece of regional folk art, capturing bands from Grand Rapids, Holland, Lansing, Muskegon, and elsewhere in western Michigan and thereby offering a specific portrait of a place, or perhaps more specifically a time.*

The set begins with the snide "I'm Tempted", by Grand Rapids' the Quests, who are represented with three other numbers, including the collection's title cut, "Scream Loud", and the fuzz-driven "Shadows in the Night" (replete with its Beach Boys style falsetto harmonies) which should already be highly familiar to many garage aficionados, having been previously "comped" on Hit Records' Trash Box. Tonto and the Renegades from nearby Grand Ledge, are also represented by four songs, including the disc's sophomore track "Little Boy Blue", their-known song, as well as "I Knew This Thing Would Happen" and "The Easy Way Out", which provides the set with a horn-based counterpart to the set's customary "clang". In likewise fashion, The JuJus's own quartet of songs, is scattered throughout the disc, beginning with the doleful "I'm Really Sorry", as well as "You Treated Me Bad", then "Do You Understand Me" (which includes the incidental sound of crashing broken glass objects in the background), and finally "Hey Little Girl". The Mussies from South Haven are responsible for the feedback-saturated instrumental "12 O'Clock, July" and also their rendition of Paul Revere & the Raiders' "Louie Go Home". The 9th Street Market do a hypnotic "You're Gone" and the proudly insolent "I'm a Baby". The Jades (Sparta, Michigan) are featured on several numbers, including "We Got Something Going" and "Please Come Back", as well as two topical songs critical of religion and convectional social mores: "Surface World" and "Confined Congregation." "Boy is Gone", is by Lyn & the Invaders and showcases Linda "Lyn"Nowicki on the compilation's only female vocal. The set contains two organ-drenched songs from Lansing's the Chancellors, "5 Minus 3" and "Dear John". The Assortment are represented by two songs, "First I Look At The Purse", and the punky "Bless Our Hippy Home". The Plagues, from Lansing have several cuts such as "I've Been Through It Before" and "Through This World" and the Aardvarks from Muskegon have four including "I Don't Need You" and the "I'm Higher Than I'm Down". The set concludes with the Pedestrians' "Think Twice".

== Track listing ==
=== Disc one ===
1. The Quests: "I'm Tempted" 1:40
2. Tonto and the Renegades: "Little Boy Blue" 2:28
3. The Beaux Jens: "She Was Mine" 3:13
4. The JuJus: "I'm Really Sorry" 2:27
5. The Chancellors: "5 Minus 3" 1:49
6. The Saharas: "They Play It Wild" 1:38
7. The Jades: We Got Something Going (C. Clarke) 2:27
8. The Chentelles "Be My Queen" (M. L. Adems) 2:08
9. The Headhunters: "Time We Share" 3:32
10. The Assortment: "First I Look at the Purse" 2:47
11. 9th Street Market: "You're Gone" 2:54
12. The Blokes: "All American Girl" 2:49
13. The Sheffields: "Nothing I Can Do" (J. P. Dunn) 2:38
14. The Aardvarks: "I Don't Believe" 2:26
15. The Blues Company: "She's Gone" (Tim Ward) 2:56
16. The Soul Benders: "Seven and Seven Is" (Arthur Lee) 1:56
17. The Black Watch: "Left Behind" 2:32
18. The 18 Penetraters: What Went Wrong 2:34
19. The Jades: "Surface World" (C. Clarke) 2:34
20. The Aardvarks: "I'm Higher Than I'm Down" 2:18
21. The Mussies: "12 O'Clock, July" 3:45
22. The JuJus: "You Treat Me Bad" 1:54
23. The Tribe: "Fickle Little Girl" 2:04
24. The Plagues: "Why Can't You Be True" 2:43
25. Peter and the Prophets: "Don't Need Your Lovin'" 2:41
26. Tonto and the Renegades: "I Knew This Thing Would Happen" 2:50
27. Barons: "Try a Love with Me" (Dave Marquette) 1:50
28. The Quests: "Shadows in the Night" 2:37
29. Me and Dem Guys: "Come on Little Sweetheart" 2:11
30. Renegades V: "Wine, Wine, Wine" (Gene Haufler) 2:26

=== Disc two ===
1. The Plagues: "I've Been Through It Before" 2:38
2. The Mussies: "Louie, Go Home" 2:23
3. The Fugitives: "You Can't Blame That on Me" 2:44
4. The Legends: "I'll Come Again" 2:09
5. The JuJus: "Do You Understand Me" 2:36
6. The Quests: "Psychic" 2:35
7. 9th Street Market: "I'm a Baby" 2:39
8. Peter and the Prophets: "Johnny of Dreams" 2:48
9. The Pedestrians: "It's Too Late" (Tony Cooper) 1:59
10. The Beaux Jens: "Trouble Baby" 1:58
11. The Bed of Roses: "I Gotta Fight" 2:47
12. The Aardvarks: "That's Your Way" 2:14
13. The Barons: "Don't Come Back No More" 2:15
14. The Jades: "Confined Congregation" 1:52
15. The Fugitives: "I'll Hang Around" 1:53
16. The Blokes: "Slander's Child" 2:17
17. Lyn and the Invaders: "Boy Is Gone" 2:39
18. Tonto and the Renegades: "The Easy Way Out" (Dick Wagner) 2:20
19. The Jades: "Please Come Back" 2:11
20. Pentagon's: "Try and Find" 2:41
21. The Plagues: "(Clouds Send Down) Tears from My Eyes" 2:48
22. The Place: "Poor Boys Pride" 2:25
23. The Chancellors: "Dear John" 2:32
24. The Assortment: "Bless Our Hippie Home" (Bruce Miller) 2:32
25. The Plagues: "Through This World" (Bill C. Malone) 2:10
26. The Aardvarks: "I Don't Need You" 2:30
27. The Blues Company: "Experiment in Color" (Tim Ward) 2:06
28. The JuJus: "Hey Little Girl" 2:00
29. Tonto and the Renegades: "Anytime You Want Some Lovin'" (Dick Wagner) 2:03
30. The Quests: "Scream Loud" 2:30
31. The Pedestrians: "Think Twice" (Tony Cooper) 2:46
