= Teenage Shutdown! "Howlin' for My Darlin'" =

Teenage Shutdown! "Howlin for My Darlin'"

Compilation album
- Released: February 11, 2000
- Recorded: 1965–1968
- Genre: Garage rock; R&B
- Length: 46:35
- Label: Crypt

chronology
Teenage Shutdown! "I'm Gonna Stay" (2000)	Teenage Shutdown! "Howlin for My Darlin'" (2000)	Teenage Shutdown! "She's a Pest"! (2000)

Teenage Shutdown! "Howlin' for My Darlin'" (subtitled Yankee 60s Punk R&B Stomp Mayhem!) is a compilation album featuring garage rock musical artists that recorded between 1965 and 1968. It is the fourteenth installment of the Teenage Shutdown! series and was released on Crypt Records on February 11, 2000 (see 2000 in music).

The album's material revolves around cover versions and influences from more commercially successful English R&B acts like the Pretty Things, the Rolling Stones, and the Animals. Musical highlights include Limey and the Yanks' "Guaranteed Love", which originally appeared on the L.A. Nuggets compilation. The Jagged Edge is the most prominently available group with three tracks featured, including a cover version of the Pretty Things' "Big City". An additional cover of a Pretty Things song is produced by the Hawaiian-based band, the Undertakers. Additionally, "Leave Me Alone" by the only non-American, the pre-Band group, the Canadian Squires, is marked by its rockabilly instrumentals.

Teenage Shutdown! Howlin' for My Darlin' was released to correspond with Vernon Joynson's extensive guide to garage and psychedelic rock musical artists, Fuzz Acid & Flowers. The album is considered to be one of the series' best releases, next to Teenage Shutdown! The World Ain't Round, It's Square!.

== Track listing ==
1. Tasmanians: "Baby" - 2:10
2. Limey and the Yanks: "Guaranteed Love" - 2:24
3. Greek Fountains: "Howlin' for My Darling" - 2:43
4. The Jagged Edge: "Gonna Find My Way" - 2:40
5. Nick Hoffman: "King of the Moon" - 2:15
6. The Graven Image: "Take a Bite of Life" - 2:10
7. The Undertakers: "Rosalyn" - 2:35
8. The Devil's Own: "I Just Wanna Make Love" - 2:33
9. The Jagged Edge: "Big City" - 2:00
10. The Canadian Squires: "Leave Me Alone" - 2:33
11. Keith Kessler: "Don't Crowd Me" - 2:40
12. The Underworld: "Go Away" - 2:41
13. The Rogues: "Train Kept A-Rolling" - 2:33
14. The Cobras: "Instant Heartache" - 2:35
15. The Dirty Shames: "I Don't Care" - 2:53
16. The Tropics: "You Better Move" - 2:57
17. The Jagged Edge: "I'm a Man" - 2:36
