= Teenage Shutdown! She'll Hurt You in the End =

Compilation album
- Released: December 29, 1998
- Recorded: 1960s
- Genre: Garage rock; psychedelic rock
- Length: 42:20
- Label: Crypt

chronology
| Teenage Shutdown! Get a Move On!!! (1998) | Teenage Shutdown! She'll Hurt You in the End (1998) | Teenage Shutdown! Teen Jangler Blowout! (1998) |

Teenage Shutdown! She'll Hurt You in the End (subtitled Teener Garage Explosion, Vol. 2) is compilation album featuring psychedelic and garage rock musical artists that recorded in the 1960s. It is the eighth installment of the Teenage Shutdown! series and was released on Crypt Records on December 29, 1998. Like Teenage Shutdown! You Treated Me Bad! the use of "Teener" in the subtitling appears to represent that the album's contents are raw and somewhat amateurish.

The album's title and opening track by the Four-Fifths is the highlight of the track list, and was compiled from the original Associated Studios acetate. The IV Pak's "Whatzit?" replicates the melody featured on the Count Five's "Psychotic Reaction". Other musical highlights include the King Bee's "I Want My Baby", which was heavily based on the Beatles' "It Won't Be Long" and the Wee Four's "Weird" is among the most original compositions featured. In addition, tracks by the Soothayers and the Nightcaps are perhaps the more coherent offering on the album.

Teenage Shutdown! She'll Hurt You in the End is considered one of the weakest installments from the series; however, it has been one of the most reissued albums. It has been rereleased in 2000, 2003, and exclusively rereleased on vinyl in 2012.

== Track listing ==
1. The Four Fifths: "She'll Hurt You in the End" - 2:42
2. The Gee Tees: "Dog" - 2:28
3. Three from Three: "That's What I Say" - 2:38
4. The Nightcaps: "Tell My Baby" - 2:35
5. The Marauders: "Nightmare" - 3:01
6. The IV Pak: "Whatzit?" - 2:40
7. The King Bees: "I Want My Baby" - 3:21
8. The Few: "Why Oh Why" - 2:05
9. The Wee Four: "Weird" - 2:04
10. The Quests: "I'm Tempted" - 1:40
11. The Soothsayers: "Black Nor Blue" - 1:50
12. The Levis: "That's Not the Way" - 2:25
13. The Corals: "Red Eye Glasses" - 2:02
14. The Ascots: "Who Will It Be" - 1:56
15. The Sting Rays: "Shaggy Dog" - 1:45
16. The Weejuns: "Way Down" - 2:08
17. The Actioneers: "No One Wants Me" - 2:45
18. The Chevrons Five: "I Lost You Today" - 1:55
