= The Aardvarks =

American garage rock band (1964–1968)

- 1966 promotional photo

Background information
- Origin: Muskegon, Michigan, United States
- Genres: Garage rock; psychedelic rock
- Years active: 1964-1968
- Labels: Fenton; Vark; Forte; Talpa
- Past members: Daryl Dingler; Rick Kuerth; Garey Walker; Terry Potts; Don Harold; Jimmy Britton; John Carter; Tim Smiley; Neal Stone

The Aardvarks were an American garage rock band from Muskegon, Michigan who were active between 1964-1968. They recorded three singles, two of which were issued on labels of Dave Kalmback's Fenton Records based in Sparta, Michigan. The group scored a local hit with "I'm Higher than I'm Down", which is now considered a garage rock classic, and several of their songs have been included in garage rock compilations.

== History ==
=== Formation ===
The Aardvarks from Muskegon, Michigan, had their origins in a previous group, the Hitchhikers, whose membership included lead vocalist Daryl Dingler and drummer Garey Walker, who went on to form the new band in late 1964. Initially, the lineup consisted of group leader Dingler on lead vocals and Walker on drums, along with John Carter and Rick Spatt on guitars. After Spatt departed for college, the band decided that it needed keyboards, so Dingler asked Rick Kuerth to join on organ. Kuerth played classical piano and knew Gary Walker at high school, where they both played percussion in the marching band. According to Kuerth, "I never considered us a 'garage band'. Yes, we originally rehearsed in Garey's basement, but he did not even have a real garage. One of the first things Chuck did was to rent us a building for us to rehearse in (our rehearsal hall). We never played in a garage, except once at my house. We were able to play as loud and long as we wanted and didn't bother anyone." The band needed a bass player and eventually found Terry Potts to fill the role. According to Kuerth, "I see myself and Terry as being part of an evolution in Darryl's vision for the group that really worked out quite well."

=== Local success and recording ===
The Aardvarks began to attract a following in the Muskegon area. At a battle of the bands held at LC Walker Arena in 1966, Chuck St. Louis approached Darryl Dingler and arranged to meet with the band. St. Louis became the group's de facto manager and convinced the band to replace John Carter with Chris Johnson, a talented guitar player who was adept at figuring out the chords to many of the cover songs, and bring in Jim Britton and Don Herald. St. Louis was able to help the band focus on a higher level, instilling a new level of professionalism and discipline. He convinced the band to employ three part harmonies and coordinated the band's wardrobe and attire, in addition to connecting the group with a professional booking agency in Grand Rapids, arranging travel itineraries, scheduling publicity photos, purchasing high quality Vox amplifiers and a PA system for the band, and establishing a well-organized practice schedule.

St. Louis arranged for the group to record for Fenton Records at their Great Lakes Recording Studio in Sparta, Michigan, which was located in a still-active movie theater. The label, theater, and studio were owned by Dave Kalmbach, who produced the sessions. The band's first single was "I'm Higher Than I'm Down" backed with "That's Your Way", which appeared in May 1966 on Vark Records, the group's self-titled vanity label for Fenton. "I'm Higher than I'm Down" became a hit on the local top 40. The group followed it up with, "I Don't Believe" b/w "I Don't Need You" which was released on the regular Fenton Label in September 1966. According to Kuerth, "Darryl wrote all of our original material himself, and arranged it". The band recorded two unreleased songs, the protest anthem "People of the Land" and "I Can't Explain".

In 1967, went Ed VerSchure's studio in Holland, Michigan to record their third single "Cherrie Can't You Tell" b/w "Let's Move Together" which appeared on Forte Records, a vanity label for the group, which was owned by Charlie Bowbeer, a friend of their manager Chuck St. Louis. The band appeared on the same bill as the Grateful Dead on the regionally-aired Swingin' Time TV show. Kuerth remembers:

It was near the end of a tour we did and we were on the way back home. Saturday morning, I believe, and live. The really big deal, of course, is that we shared the stage with the Grateful Dead. We also had to share a dressing room with them. They were all high and pretty full of themselves and actually made fun of us. Their lip-synch performance was awful. We did a much better job with our performance—the first and only time we did that. We performed the songs off the Forte label. Aside from the Dead, the most memorable recollection was when the host told us we all had to go out on the dance floor and dance with whatever girl we wanted to. He also told us about two million kids were watching on TV. We were all terrified because NONE of us knew how to dance!

=== Demise ===
The band's manager Chuck St. Louis introduced the group to Harper and Rowe, a singing duo from Canada who were looking for a backing unit, but the Aardvarks declined the engagement. Drummer Garey Walker joined the army and left the band. The band attempted to continue and tried the former drummer from local group the Shackelfosts, but after one gig, they decided that the fit was not right with the loss of Walker. According to Kuerth, "It was like someone ripped our heart out and it was just not the same". Terry Potts and Rick Kuerth departed from the group shortly afterward, with Spatt enrolling in college. Dingler attempted to keep the band together with a new lineup, but with little success. The Aardvarks broke up in 1968.

=== Post-breakup ===
Kuerth joined the army, and when he returned he played with a local group in the early 1970s. Terry Potts and Don Harold are now deceased. Guitarist Jimmy Britton, who still resides in Muskegon, owns a recording studio and is active in the country music scene. Garey Walker remained in the military and became a warrant officer. He now lives in Maryland and plays drums at his church. John Carter is retired and lives in Holland, Michigan. Daryl Dingler now lives in Grand Haven and manages a golf course. Like Britton, has a recording studio and collects Fender amplifiers. Kuerth is now retired and continues to play keyboards, guitar, and banjo.

=== Compilations ===
The Aardvarks work has come to the attention of garage rock enthusiasts and collectors. The four cuts they released for their Fenton/Vark singles are included on Way Back Records' 2006 compilation, Scream Loud!!! The Fenton Story. "I'm Higher than I'm Down" has been recognized as a garage rock classic (Note: In Mike Markesich's book, the single "I'm Higher Than I'm Down" is ranked at #207 out of the top 1000 garage songs list, voted on by a panel of garage rock writers and experts (pg. 376).) and also appears on Gravel, Volume 2.

== Membership ==
- Daryl Dingler (lead vocals)
- Rick Kuerth (keyboards)
- Garey Walker (drums)
- Terry Potts (bass)
- Don Harold (guitar)
- Jimmy Britton (lead guitar)
- John Carter (guitar)
- Tim Smiley (guitar)
- Neal Stone (drums)

== Discography ==
- "I'm Higher Than I'm Down" b/w "That's Your Way" (Vark 2058, May 1966)
- "I Don't Believe" b/w "I Don't Need You" (Fenton 2090, September 1966)
- "Cherrie Can't You Tell" b/w "Let's Move Together" (Forte 2021, August 1967) (Talpa 68101, January 1968)
