= Teenage Shutdown! "She's a Pest"! =

Compilation album
- Released: February 14, 2000
- Recorded: 1960s
- Genre: Garage rock; psychedelic rock
- Label: Crypt

chronology
Teenage Shutdown! "Howlin' for My Darlin'" (2000)	Teenage Shutdown! "She's a Pest"! (2000)

Teenage Shutdown! "She's a Pest"! is a compilation album featuring obscure American garage and psychedelic rock musical artists that were recorded in the 1960s. It is the fifteenth and final installment of the Teenage Shutdown series. Typical of its predecessors, the album's material originated from the collection of Mike Markesich, who also provided the liner notes. The album was released on Crypt Records on February 14, 2000.

Musical highlights include a homage to Bo Diddley by Tampa Bay group the Rovin' Flames, which was first released in June 1966, and featured distorted guitar instrumentals by Jimmy "Mouse" Morrison. The title track is provided by the obscure Los Angeles band the Insects, from their first of three singles. Additionally, the song "Gone, Gone, Gone" is a folk rock number by the Third Evolution prior to the group's name change and progression into psychedelia. A fast-paced composition, "I Gotta Be Goin'" by the Plague is one of the more-compiled tracks on the album, as it also appears on Louisiana Punk Groups from the Sixties, Volume 2, and Sixties Archive, Volume 3. Other tracks include the Living Ends' "Self-Centered Girl", featuring a future member of the Looking Glass, the Lavender Hour's "I Gotta Way with Girls", which was covered by the Chesterfield Kings, and the Sceptres rendition of the Rolling Stones' hit "The Last Time".

== Track listing ==
1. The Pendelums: "Tell Me" - 2:14
2. The Rovin' Flames: "Bo Diddley" - 2:31
3. The Wind: "Your Man Is Gonna Leave You" - 2:40
4. The Insects: "She's a Pest" - 1:57
5. The Third Evolution "Gone, Gone, Gone" - 2:16
6. The Playgue: "I Gotta Be Goin'" - 2:48
7. The Treez: "Only as Long as You Want It" - 2:44
8. The Living Ends: "Self Centered Girl" - 2:42
9. A.J. and the Savages: "Long Long Time" - 2:32
10. The Lavender Hour: "I've Gotta Way with Girls" - 2:22
11. The Wind: "Don't Take Your Love Away" - 2:13
12. The Sceptres: "The Last Time" - 3:23
13. Apollo's Apaches: "Cry Me a Lie" - 2:28
14. The Chyldren: "Cut Your Lawn" - 2:43
15. Mott's Men She Is So Mean 2:55
16. The Royal Knights: "I Wanna Know" - 1:55
17. The Primates: "Knock on My Door" - 2:26
18. The Converts: "Don't Leave Me" - 3:02
