= The Jades (American band) =

American garage rock band

Background information
- Origin: Sparta, Michigan, United States
- Genres: Garage rock
- Years active: 1965-1968
- Labels: Fenton Records
- Past members: Rich Seigel; Craig Clarke; Phil Succop; Floyd Johnson; Roy Johnson; Dan Preston; Bill Alexander

The Jades were an American garage rock band from Sparta, Michigan, that was active in the 1960s (not to be confused with several other bands from the period also named "the Jades"). They were one of the most popular bands in Sparta and West Michigan and cut two singles for Fenton Records owned by Dave Kalmback, who eventually became the group's manager. They are remembered for songs such as "Please Come Back" and the topical "Confined Congregation", and their work is highly regarded today by garage rock collectors and enthusiasts.

== History ==
=== Origins ===
"Memories about the band are still crystal clear after 45 years. Four kids that lived more in four or five years than most people do in twenty, I remember so many other groups in the Greater Grand Rapids area and all around Michigan having shared the same kind of experiences. We were lucky with out even knowing it. In our heads we were the Stones, Beatles, Animals.....every time we got on stage and played these great new tunes. It was so easy to play all night and tear down, load it up, take home, and get up early and practice the next day and then do it all over again that next night. Then school on Monday and walking through the halls with a grin on your face just remembering how much fun you had last weekend, knowing no one would believe you if you told them. Except for the boys in the band. Those truly were the good old days. My hat is off to my dear old friends in the band that are fortunately still around. The Jades."

– Craig Clarke reflecting on his experience with the Jades

The Jades formed in the fall of 1965 by students from Sparta High School in Sparta, Michigan. Their original membership consisted of Rich Seigel, who was blind, on vocals and rhythm guitar, Craig Clarke on vocals and bass, Phil Succop on lead guitar, and Roy Johnson on drums. Siegel and Clarke usually handled the vocals. Drummer Johnson left the band six months later and was replaced by Dan Preston. Floyd Johnson, a country music fan, would occasionally play on the piano located on the stage in the schools' gym while the band was practicing there in hopes that they would ask him to join, which they eventually did—he later became their official keyboard player. The Jades' primary influences were British Invasion bands such as the Beatles, the Rolling Stones, the Animals, the Yardbirds, and Them, featuring Van Morrison. Clarke was fourteen when the band formed and, unlike the other band members who were self-trained, he had taken lessons in classical guitar, but switched to bass. Lead guitarist Phil Succup had a truck and provided with transportation. Sparta High School's choir director Bob Stiles and Arnie DePagter, a Spanish teacher and coach, helped the band get gigs. The Jades first performance was at the Spanish Fiesta event held at the Sparta High School gym. The band worked occasional parties and became popular in the Tri-County region, regularly playing at high school dances in Rockford, Sparta, Rogers, Cedar Springs, Coppersville, Lowell, and other elsewhere and eventually toured statewide. For two summers they performed three nights a week at a club in Hess Lake and competed in several Battle of the Bands contests, winning one held at the Grand Rapids Civic Auditorium (also attended by the Quests form Grand Rapids) and coming in second in another held at the Black & Silver Room to a crowd of over a thousand, where they reached the semi-finals in the playoffs and were awarded $150.

We competed with the Mothers from Bay City (I think) in a Battle of the Bands at the Black & Silver Room. They were one of the best groups I've ever seen. Locally, Me and Dem Guys were the best around here. They became Common People, and had a few different vocalists. Lynn from Lynn and The Invaders joined them in the Seventies and one of their singers went on to sing for Toto.

=== Recording ===
Eventually their touring itinerary came to include the entire Michigan area. In 1965 the Jades' bassist Craig Clarke got job working at the Great Lakes recording studio, which was located in the Sparta Theater, an historic palace theater, which served the dual purpose of movie venue and recording studio. It was owned by Dave Kalmback, who was the proprietor of Fenton Records and with its high ceilings, was known for having spacious acoustics, which can be heard on many Fenton recordings. The studio also had an eight-track source tape machine, which was ahead of its time for the mid-1960s. Clarke initially landed the job there to assist Kalmback in re-installing pipes to the theater's antique organ, but later began helping around the studio during sessions. Clarkes assisted on the session for the Woolies' recording of Bo Diddley's "Who do You Love", which became a national top twenty hit. Keyboardist Floyd Johnson worked at the theater selling popcorn. In exchange for pay, Clarke made an arrangement with Kalmback to let the Jades use free studio time to record for the Fenton label. In 1966 drummer Dan Preston left and was replaced by Bill Alexander, who initially lied to the members of the group claiming he had played drums when he had not. He bought a drum set at Middleton Music, and joined the band. According to Alexander, "It's the greatest thing I ever did and would do it again."

The band's first single featured two songs written by guitarist Rich Siegel: the moody "Please Come Back" and the flip-side "Confined Congregation", a protest song aimed religious hypocrisy amongst the older establishment. It was released in February 1967 and was followed in June with "Surface World", another protest song, this time written by Siegel and Clarke, backed with "We've Got Something Going", a catchy dance number. The group recorded several unissued songs, such as "Backlash" and "Down Home" which are believed to be lost. After the release of their second single, Dave Kalmback became the group's manager, and he attempted to secure the group with bigger and better-paying live dates, but by 1968 Clarke, Siegel, and guitarist Phil Succop enrolled in various colleges, diminishing the group's productivity. The Jades played their last performance in late 1968. According to Jayne Paasch writing for the Sparta Township Historical Commission:

One of the most poignant stories of the day was when Phil remembered the last time the Jades played together, still so very clear in his mind today. It was Christmas break 1968 and they played a party at the Civic Center here in Sparta. The reason he remembers that night is because it was the night he said good-by to Craig Yates, a classmate who was about to leave for Viet Nam. Craig died the following May 29. He was one of too many boys from Sparta who gave their last full measure that sad summer and are missed by so many to this day.

The jades broke up shortly thereafter.

=== Later developments, legacy, and reunion ===
Rich Seigel attended University of Michigan and, because of his blindness, studied in braille. In the early 1970s Craig Clarke and Bill Alexander played for a few years in a local three-piece country rock bar band. Clarke continued to play in a series of rock bands over the years, and has more recently played in a blues band, Blues Stew, with his son who is the lead singer. He became a sales consultant of industrial equipment for warehouse and storage systems.

Marking the 50th anniversary of their founding, in August 2015 the Jades (Craig Clarke, Rich Siegel, Floyd Johnson, Phil Succop, and Bill Alexander) reunited for the "Celebrating Sparta Alumni Artists" as part of the "Town & Country Days" event held by Sparta High School.

The Jades work has come to the attention of garage rock collectors and enthusiasts and has been included on several compilations. All four of their songs released on single are included on Scream Loud!!! The Fenton Story. "Surface World" is featured on Teenage Shutdown! Nobody to Love. Regarding his time with the Jades and his indoctrination into a life of playing music, Clarke recounts:

I wouldn't trade it for the world. What an experience for your teenage years - playing music almost every day, meeting people and making friends that have many of the same interests as you, traveling around your state (and) having more fun than you should be able to have. It was a great time and even though my father has been gone for quite some time I say my thanks that he encouraged me to take those guitar lessons. Today I am able to play with my son and some other young musicians and it never gets old.

== Members ==
=== 1964 ===
- Rich Seigel (guitar and vocals)
- Craig Clarke (bass and vocals)
- Phil Succop (guitar)
- Floyd Johnson (keyboards)
- Roy Johnson (drums)

=== 1965-1966 ===
- Rich Seigel (rhythm guitar and vocals)
- Craig Clarke (bass and vocals)
- Phil Succop (lead guitar)
- Roy Johnson (drums)
- Floyd Johnson (keyboards)
- Dan Preston (drums)

=== 1966-1969 and 2015 ===
- Rich Seigel (lead vocals, guitar)
- Craig Clarke (bass and vocals)
- Phil Succop (guitar)
- Floyd Johnson (keyboards)
- Bill Alexander (drums)

== Discography ==
- "Please Come Back" b/w "Confined Congregation" (Fenton 2134, February 1967)
- "Surface World" b/w "We've Got Something Going" (Fenton 2208, June 1967)
