= Floyd Johnson (disambiguation) =

Floyd Johnson is an American boxer. It may also refer to:

- Floyd "Candy" Johnson (1922–1981), American saxophone player
- Floyd Albin Johnson (1908–1974), Canadian politician
- Floyd Johnson, member of The Jades (American band)
- Floyd Johnson, arena football coach of Alaska Wild
- Floyd Johnson, figure skater who participated in the 1992 U.S. Figure Skating Championships
