= Miller–Sparta Airport =

Paul C. Miller–Sparta Airport
- IATA: none; ICAO: 8D4

Summary
- Airport type: Public
- Operator: Village of Sparta
- Location: Sparta, Michigan
- Elevation AMSL: 775 ft (236 m)
- Coordinates: 43°07′38″N 85°40′42″W

Map
- Location of airport in Michigan 8D4 (the United States)

Runways
Direction	Length		Surface
Direction	ft	m	Surface
7/25	4,033	1,229	Asphalt

Paul C. Miller–Sparta Airport (FAA LID: 8D4) is a public airport located 3 mi (5 km) southeast of Sparta, Michigan. Established in 1941, the airport is currently owned and operated by the Village of Sparta and is self-supporting, requiring no public funding. It is included in the Federal Aviation Administration (FAA) National Plan of Integrated Airport Systems for 2017–2021, in which it is categorized as a regional general aviation facility.

The airport holds a number of airshows and exhibits, particularly to honor World War 2 veterans living nearby.

The airport is home to a chapter of the Experimental Aircraft Association.

== Facilities and aircraft ==
The airport has one runway, designated as Runway 7/25. It measures 4032 x 75 ft (1229 x 23 m) and is paved with asphalt.

The airport has a fixed-base operator that sells avgas. Other services such as general maintenance, courtesy and rental cars, and a crew lounge are available. The airport is used for primarily for general aviation and currently has flight training, through either Sparta Aviation Services or the West Michigan Flight Academy.

For the 12-month period ending December 31, 2021, the airport had 62,000 aircraft operations. It was composed entirely of general aviation. For the same time period, 95 aircraft were based on the airport: 86 single-engine and 5 multi-engine airplanes, 2 jet airplanes, and 2 helicopters.

== Accidents and incidents ==
- On August 21, 1967, a Beechcraft 67 Queen Air crashed immediately after takeoff from Sparta. One engine lost power while on the takeoff roll, but the pilot decided to continue the takeoff procedure. Shortly after liftoff, the airplane encountered difficulties to gain height, struck trees and crashed in a wooded area. The airplane was destroyed and all five occupants were killed.
- On October 25, 2000, a Piper PA28 was destroyed when it struck trees and terrain during initial climb from Sparta airport. A fire consumed portions of the aircraft subsequent to the impact. The probable cause of the crash was the pilot's failure to maintain proper runway alignment on departure and his failure to maintain clearance from the trees.
- On February 18, 2003, a Beech V35 sustained substantial damage when it landed hard, collapsed the left main landing gear, and hit a snowbank during landing at Sparta airport. The probable cause was found to be the pilots improper decision to fly into known adverse weather, and his failure to maintain airspeed which resulted in an inadvertent stall.
- On October 1, 2010, a Cessna 182 Skylane impacted a deer on takeoff.
- On August 4, 2016, about 2030 eastern daylight time, an amateur-built PA14EXP airplane sustained substantial damage when it struck a fence and nosed over during a forced landing following a loss of engine power during initial climb after takeoff. The pilot reported that he performed a pre-flight inspection of the airplane and a run-up prior to takeoff. All checks were normal. He stated that the takeoff was normal until reaching about 300 feet above ground level when the engine lost all power. He stated that the engine was still rotating. He checked the fuel selector, which was on "both", and attempted to pump the throttle which had no effect. He then executed a forced landing to an adjacent field, but stuck a fence with the landing gear. The airplane came to a rest on the ground past the fence. The cause of the engine failure could not be determined.
- On August 12, 2017, a Cessna 182 Skylane sustained substantial damage following a hard landing at the airport. The pilot reported that the airplane landed hard and bounced. He added that he performed a go-around, landed, and taxied to the ramp uneventfully, later noticing substantial damage to the aircraft's fuselage. The probable cause was found to be the pilot's improper landing flare, which resulted in a hard landing.
- On January 12, 2021, a Piper Cherokee Six struck a snowbank short of the runway following a GPS approach. The airplane touched down about 18 ft short of the runway and encountered a small snowbank near the end of the runway. The landing gear collapsed, and the airplane skidded down the runway before coming to rest near the 1,000 ft. touchdown markings.
- On August 10, 2022, an aircraft overran the runway and impacted a fence while departing from Sparta Airport.

== See also ==
- List of airports in Michigan
