= Teenage Shutdown! Nobody to Love =

Compilation album
- Released: October 6, 1998
- Recorded: 1960s
- Genre: Garage rock; folk rock
- Label: Crypt

chronology
Teenage Shutdown! I'm a No-Count (1998)	Teenage Shutdown! Nobody to Love (1998)	Teenage Shutdown! I'm Down Today (1998)

Teenage Shutdown! Nobody to Love, sometimes referred to as "Volume 5", is the fifth installment in the Teenage Shutdown! series of garage rock compilations put out by Tim Warren of Crypt Records, which is available on both LP and compact disc formats. This volume was released on October 6, 1998, and consists primarily of folk rock-influenced material, not to mention some protest songs, as indicated in the sub-heading, "Mid-60s Teen Folkpunk: 18 Tales of Tension & Trauma". Like all of the entries in the series, the collection was compiled and mastered by Warren, using original 45 rpm records selected from the collection of garage rock archivist Mike Markesich (colloquially known as "Mop Top Mike").

Charlotte, North Carolina's The Paragons, whose membership featured Johnny Pace on drums and lead vocals, as well as Pat Walters, later of the Spongetones, on twelve-string guitar, perform "Abba", which they recorded at Arthur Smith's Studios, located in their hometown. The Shandells perform the "Shades of Blue", which features an accordion-like cordox. The Answers from San Bernardino, California, whose membership included steel guitarist Glenn Ross Campbell, later of the psychedelic cult band the Misunderstood, perform "Please Please Go Away" and the anti-Vietnam War protest song "Fool Turn Around". "Surface World", another protest song, is sung by the Jades from Sparta, Michigan. On other tracks the Rogues sing the Byrds-influenced "You Better Look Now" and the Go-Betweens from Queens perform "Have You for My Own".

== Track listing ==
1. The Intruders (Pittsfield, Illinois)- "Now That You Know"
2. The Illusions (St. Clair Shores, Michigan) - "Wait Till the Summer"
3. The Shan Dels - (Levittown, New York) "Shades of Blue"
4. The Paradox (Florida) - "There's a Flower Shop"
5. The Lovin' Kind (Cleveland, Ohio)- "I'm Free"
6. Mike's Messengers (Quantico, Maryland) - "Cause of All Man-kind"
7. Sonics Inc. (United States) - "Nobody to Love"
8. The Answers (San Bernardino, California) - "Fool Turn Around"
9. The Jades (Sparta, Michigan) - "Surface World"
10. The Twilights (San Jose, California) - "It Couldn't Be True"
11. The Viscount V (Albuquerque, New Mexico)- "She Doesn't Know"
12. The Paragons (Charlotte, North Carolina) - "Abba"
13. The Sounds Like Us (Duluth, Minnesota) - "Outside Chance"
14. The Rogues (Buffalo, New York) - "You Better Look Now"
15. The Go-Betweens (Queens, New York)- "Have You for My Own"
16. The Answers (San Bernardino, California) - "Please Please Go Away"
17. The Plagues - (Lansing, Michigan) - "(Clouds Send Down) Tears from My Eyes"
18. The Lovin' Kind (Cleveland, Ohio)- "Can't Explain"

== Catalogue and release information ==
- Record (LP-TS-6605, 1998)
- Compact disc (CD-TS-6605, 1998)
