= Fenton Records discography =

Fenton Records was an American record label of the 1960s, which released a number of singles and a few albums predominantly recorded by Michigan garage rock bands.

== Discography ==
Artist	Title	Catalogue no.
Dave and The Shadows	Faith/Playboy	Fenton 942
J.D. and the Dynamics	Dragonfly/Mozart Mash (D. Kalmbach)	Fenton 943
Rhythm Rockers	Three Strikes/Surf Around	Fenton 944
Renegades IV	Greensleeves/ Autumn Night	Fenton 945
Sue and the Dynamics	Go Tell It on the Mountain/Loving Eyes	Fenton 948
Sheffields	Nothing I Can Do/ My Only Wish	Fenton 980
Renegades V	Wine Wine Wine/ Love and Fury	Duboney 982
Barons	Try A Love With Me/ Don't Come Back No More	Jafes 985
Scavengers	Oasis/Curfew	Fenton 987
Penetrators	What Went Wrong/ Cross the River of Love	Fenton 992
Pepettes	Rock/ Flashing Lights	Fenton 995
Lloids of Lon-Den	You Will Go Fenton/ Girls Can Really Dance	Fenton 1000
Kick Litscher	Passing of the Backhouse/ Hermit of the Shark Tooth Shoals	Fenton 1002
The JuJus	You Treat Me Bad/ Hey Little Girl	Fenton 1004
Young-Uns	Walkin' Down the Line/ Make Me a Grave / Let's Go a-Sailin'/ Let Me Go	Fenton 2008
Chevrons V	I Lost You Today/ Niat Pat Lavram	Nook 2010
Ram Rods	You Know I Love You/ I Remember	Fenton 2014
Saharas	I'm Free/ This Mornin'	Fenton 2016
The Plagues	Why Can't You Be True/ Through This World	Quarantined 2020
Bennie Carew	Kansas City/ Bye Bye	Fenton 2022
Bobby Charles Quartet	Oh! Lonesome me/ Saturday Night	Fenton 2024
Quests	Scream Loud/ Psychic	Fenton 2032
Lyn and the Invaders	Boy Is Gone/ Secretly	Fenton 2040
Peter and the Prophets	Johnny Of Dreams/ Don't Need Your Lovin'	Fenton 2050
Aardvarks	I'm Higher Than I'm Down/ That's Your Way	Vark 2058
Don Hanke and the Echo Men	Put a Tiger in My Tank/ You Are the One	Fenton 2064
The Chancellors	One In A Million/ Journey	Fenton 2066
The Plagues	I've Been Through It Before/ Tears From My Eyes	Fenton 2070
The Chancellors	Dear John/ 5 Minus 3	Fenton 2072
Fugitives	I'll Hang Around/ You Can't Blame That On Me	Fenton 2075
Fugitives	You Can't Blame That On Me	Fenton 2075
Me and Dem Guys	Black Cloud/ Come On Little Sweetheart	Coral Gables 2082
Pentagons	Try And Find/ Before I Go	Pent 2084
Quests	Shadows In The Night/ I'm Tempted	Fenton 2086
Tribe	Fickle Little Girl/ Try Try Try	Fenton 2088
Aardvarks	I Don't Believe/ I Don't Need You	Fenton 2090
Chevrons	What Everyone Wants/ Hey Little Teaser	Fenton 2092
The Pedestrians	Think Twice/ Snyder's Swamp	Fenton 2102
The Pedestrians	It's Too Late/ My Little Girl	Fenton 2116
Sheffields	Blowin' In The Wind/ Fool Minus a Heart	Fenton 2118
Chentelles	Time/ Be My Queen	Fenton 2132
Jades	Confined Congregation/ Please Come Back	Fenton 2134
9th Street Market	I'm A Baby/ You're Gone	Fenton 2136
David and the Diversified Sound	Little Boy Blue/ I Dig	Fenton 2142
Beaux Jens	She Was Mine/Trouble Baby	Sound of the Sceen 2162
Quests	What Can I Do?/ Shadows in the Night	Fenton 2174
Tonto and the Renegades	Anytime You Want Some Lovin'/ The Easy Way Out	Sound of the Sceen 2178
Ray Hummel III	Fine Day/ Gentle Rain	Fenton 2188
Ken Rank	Twin City Saucer/ Ken's Thing (By The Jades)	Fenton 2194
Blues Co.	Love Machine/ B.C. Boogie	Pear 5176842203
Jades	Surface World/ We've Got Something Going	Fenton 2208
John Brown Trio	Walking Through the Night/ It's Not Unusual	Fenton 2210
Tonto and the Renegades	I Knew This Thing Would Happen/ Little Boy Blue	Sound of the Sceen 2212
Mussies	Louie Go Home/ 12 O'clock July	Fenton 2216
Counts of Coventry	Somewhere (Someone is Waiting)/ Happy Day	4 Count 2222
Assortment	First I Look at the Purse/ Bless Our Hippy Home	Sound Spot 2224
Pedestrians	You Aren't Going to Say You Know/ The Unpredictable Miss Kinsey	Fenton 2226
Cambridge	I'm Coming Back/ Lonely Lisa	Go-T 2244
Pam Busscher	Why Is There War/ Why Can't He Love Me	Fenton 2502
Black Watch	Left Behind/ I Wish I Had The Nerve	Fenton 2508
Legends	I'm Just A Guy/ I'll Come Again	Fenton 2512
The Ones	You Haven't Seen My Love/ Happy Day	Fenton 2514
Country Ramblers	Rambler's Bounce/ A Million [...?]	Northland 2516
Headhunters	Times We Share/ Think What You've Done	Fenton 2518
4U and Him	Backdoor Man/ Travelin' Light	Fenton 2522
Poor Boys Pride	Fall Of A Town/ The Place	Swade 2524
The Fyrebirds	Can't Get No Ride/ I'm Alive	Great Lakes 2528
Soulbenders	Hey Joe/ I Can't Believe In Love	Phantasm 2530
New Era	Won't You Please Be My Friend/ We Ain't Got Time	Great Lakes 2532
Blokes	All American Girl/ Slander's Child	Dante 2545
Pedestrians	Think Twice/ It's Too Late	Buyit 2556
Soulbenders	Petals/ 7 And 7 Is	Phantasm 2568
Bed of Roses	Quiet/ I Gotta Fight	Tea 2577
Blues Company	Experiment In Color/ She's Gone	Great Lakes 3002
Merrie Motor Company	Walking Down This Road/ Dream of You	Scott 3050
Poor Boy Pride	But Yes Who Cares/ I'm Here	Fenton 3060
Dick Rabbit	Love/ Trip	Great Lakes GL-103
Deborah and Lee	Little Boxes/ No Place To Go	Fenton GL-942
Our Generation	Baby Boy/ Chicago Blues	Fenton GL-970
