= Last of the Garage Punk Unknowns, Volumes 1 & 2: American Teenage Garage Hoot 1965–1967 =

Last of the Garage Punk Unknowns, Volumes 1 & 2: American Garage Teenage Hoot 1965-1967

Compilation album
- Released: March 17, 2015
- Recorded: 1965–1967
- Genre: Garage rock; psychedelic; proto-punk
- Length: 1:12:29
- Label: Crypt

Last of the Garage Punk Unknowns, Volumes 1 & 2: American Garage Teenage Hoot 1965-1967 is a compilation album of 1960s garage rock available on compact disc and is the first installment in the CD version of the Last of the Garage Punk Unknowns series created and compiled by Tim Warren for Crypt Records. It was released and 2015 and combines volumes 1 and 2 of the LP counterparts in the series. As indicated on the front sleeve, most of the songs were recorded by American groups between 1965 and 1967. Packaging includes detailed liner notes that include basic information about each song and group, such as origin and recording date. The albums also include photographs of included groups, and cover artwork reflects the mid-1960s style graphic presentation popular on record sleeves of the time.

The set begins with "I've Been Lookin'" by the Buttons. It is followed by the double entendre-laden "Crawdad" by the Colonials. The Pastels of Pasco, Washington perform "Mirage" which features a "Louie Louie"-styled three chord arrangement. "I Wish I Could" by the Juveniles and "Mary" by the Electric Sensation both expresses different aspects romantic frustration. The Krels' "Psychedelic Feelin', which features a flute-like organ riff, is another highlight in the set. The Infinitives and the Dirt Merchants are each represented with two tracks on the compilation: The Infinitives perform "Thousand Tears" and "Heidi", while the Dirt Merchants are heard on the "Little Black Egg"-inspired "I Found Another Girl" and later "Do What You Wanta Do". The Es-Shades do the primitive "Never Met a Girl Like You". "The Last Step" of Doom" is by the Jolly Beggars and "I Need Your Lovin'" is by Ronnie D, while the Casuals take on the proto-punk "I Realize" while the Vandals later respond in similar but even fiercer form with "Your Love Will Die". The set closes with "You Can Make It" by the Empty Streets.

== Track listing ==
1. The Buttons: "I've Been Lookin'" 2:32
2. The Colonials: "Crawdad" 2:07
3. The Sonic-Lyne: "Last Time" 2:17
4. The Pastels: "Mirage" 3:57
5. The Electric Sensation: "Mary" 2:52
6. The Juveniles: "I Wish I Could" 2:06
7. The Krels: "Psychedelic Feelin'" 3:06
8. The Infinitives: "Thousand Tears" 2:02
9. The Es-Shades: "Never Met a Girl Like You Before" 2:17
10. The Expressions: "One More Night" 2:46
11. The Dirt Merchants: "I Found Another Girl" 2:31
12. The Other Side: "What in the World" 2:21
13. The Vanguards: "What's Wrong with You" 2:21
14. The Jolly Beggars: "The Last Step of Doom" 2:22
15. The Continentals: "Gloria" 2:14
16. Our Gang: "Careless Love" 2:06
17. The Infinitives: "Heidi" 2:41
18. unknown artist/act: "Got Love If You Want It" 3:13
19. The Castanovas: "I Want to Be Loved" 2:41
20. The Prophets of Old: "Just Can't Wait" 2:30
21. Ronnie D: I Need Your Lovin' 2:27
22. The Casuals Incorporated: I Realize 2:06
23. The Freedom Five: "To Save My Soul" 2:16
24. Half-Pint & The Fifths: "Loving on Borrowed Time" 2:38
25. The End Result: "Llove" 2:30
26. The Vandals: "Your Love Will Die" 2:08
27. The Royal Coachmen: "I Don't Need You" 1:46
28. Dirt Merchants: "Do What You Wanta Do" 2:35
29. The Empty Streets: "You Can Make It" 3:01

== See also ==
- Crypt Records
- Back from the Grave (series)
- List of garage rock bands
- Garage rock

== Bibliography ==
- Markesich, Mike (2012). TeenBeat Mayhem! (1st ed.). Branford, Connecticut: Priceless Info Press. ISBN 978-0-985-64825-1.
