= The Chargers (band) =

American garage rock band (1966–1969)

- From left to right: Ron Kinscherf, Steve Barone, Curt Dorey, Steve Nelsen and Tony Morgan.

Background information
- Origin: Wenatchee, Washington, United States
- Genres: Garage rock
- Years active: 1966–1969
- Label: Julian
- Past members: Larry Roller; Tony Morgan; Curt Dorey; Steve Barone; Ron Kinscherf; Don Sandstorm; Ron Nelson

The Chargers were an American garage rock formed in Wenatchee, Washington, in 1966. The group recorded one single, the Beatlesque "Taxi", which had been a regional success and remains a highly-collectible piece in its original format. Live favorites of the Washington teen scene, the Chargers recorded three additional compositions in preparation for a follow-up release, but went unreleased. Get Hip Records has issued those songs years later when the band's music resurfaced.

== History ==
With the three-year surge of popularity of the Beatles, Larry Roller (lead vocals), Tony Morgan (drums, vocals), and Curt Dorey (bass guitar, vocals) formed the three-piece version of the Chargers in 1966, which began as a cover band playing renditions of the Fab Four's songs. In need of a lead guitarist, the group enlisted Steve Barone of the Hustlers, who they had competed against in a battle of the bands. Although Roller was praised as a capable lead singer, he was dismissed from the Chargers for not sharing payments to purchase musical equipment. Plucking members from the local group the Undertakers, the Chargers completed their line-up with the inclusion of Ron Kinscherf (rhythm guitar), Don Sandstrom (vocals), and Steve Nelson (keyboards). Progressing in the same vein as early pop-oriented Beatles music, all five members contributed to the group's bright vocal harmonies.

Another garage band hailing from Wenatchee was Billy and the Kids, a group of pre-teens who recorded the two singles "Say You Love Me" and "When I See You". A rivalry between the two bands fueled each other's popularity, dividing Wenatchee's "town loyalty" between the west side (The Chargers) and the east side (Billy and the Kids). The Chargers, however useful the rivalry was, had a much more expansive touring territory than their competitors, performing in Yakima, Bridgeport, Spokane for any teen gathering the group could manage. Late in 1966, the band was victorious in a talent show at Pioneer High School, earning first-placed prize: a recording session with Julian Records. Almost immediately thereafter, the group traveled to Spokane to cut their debut single with record producer Don Bernier.

Of the two self-penned songs on the record, the Chargers selected Nelson's Beatlesque "Taxi", a tune about excusing oneself from a failed relationship. On the flip-side, Barone hastily assembled "I'm So Alone", a pre-Chargers ballad he had presented to him by guitarist Carl Hunt in 1964. Upon release, "Taxi" was well-covered in Washington, and became a number three hit on the regional radio charts. In 1968, after experiencing the endeavors of recording a single and the success that came in its wake, the band began writing new songs, many of which they scrapped before re-entering the studios. Of the compositions thought suitable for recording, three were selected: "Need Your Love", "You Got a Hold", and "In the News in General". Speaking about the songs, music historian Chris Bishop attributed the distinctive catchiness to "heavy tom-tom opening, fine organ playing and interesting rhythm changes". However, before the recording could be settled on a follow-up single, the Chargers were forced to disband as a consequence of their management insufficiently supervising funds, causing them to go broke in 1969.

Relatively unnoticed outside of Washington, the Chargers have made a resurgence as a result of collectors' interest in the "Taxi" single, which fetches high-price purchases on the market. The song has appeared on the Garage Punk Unknowns album series, and "I'm So Alone" is featured on Teenage Shutdown! I'm Down Today, which also displays a photo of the band on the cover. In 2013, Get Hip Records released the three 1968 songs along with "Taxi" on an EP titled Four by the Chargers. The Chargers have also arranged two reunions since the 2010s.
