= Teenage Shutdown! I'm Down Today =

Compilation album
- Released: December 29, 1998
- Recorded: 1960s
- Genres: Garage rock; folk rock; blues
- Length: 47:48
- Label: Crypt

chronology
| Teenage Shutdown! Nobody to Love (1998) | Teenage Shutdown! I'm Down Today (1998) | Teenage Shutdown! Get a Move On!!! (1998) |

Teenage Shutdown! I'm Down Today, sometimes referred to as "Volume 6," is the sixth installment in the Teenage Shutdown! series of garage rock compilations put out by Tim Warren of Crypt Records, which is available on both LP and compact disc formats. This volume was released on December 29, 1998 and is composed largely of moody songs and somber ballads, reflecting the darker and more introspective side of the genre, as indicated in the sub-heading, which reads "Moody & Brooding Teen Misery Lowdown." Like all of the entries in the series, the collection was compiled and mastered by Warren, using original 45 rpm records selected from the collection of noted garage rock archivist, Mike Markesich (colloquially known as "Mop Top Mike"). The photograph which appears on the front cover is of the Chargers from Wenatchee, Washington, who perform the fifteenth track, "I'm so Alone." The packaging includes liner notes providing information about the songs and bands.

The set begins the title track "I'm Down Today," by The Drones, from Valley Center, California. Also featured on the set are ruminative cuts by the Young Monkey Men, from Trenton New Jersey, who sing "I Believed in You," and Lancaster, Pennsylvania's the Shaynes, who perform the elegiac "From My Window." Also from Pennsylvania, the Other Half, from Pottstown, sing "A Lot to Live For" and Philadelphia's the Iron Gate perform "Feelin' Bad." The John Does from Los Angeles do a version of Blind Lemon Jefferson's "One Kind Favor." The mood of the set becomes particularly somber in later cuts, with the Three From Three's "Sad Lovers (Live Today)," the Amberjacks' "Blue Jaunte," descending into a darkly-shaded labyrinth which reaches its apotheosis in the final track by the Specters from Worcester, Massachusetts, "Depression."

== Track listing ==
1. The Drones (Valley Center, California) - "I'm Down Today" 2:45
2. The Nite Walkers (Downey, California) - "High Class" 2:55
3. John Brown's Bodies (Norton-Mansfield, Massachusetts) - "Out of My Mind" 2:22
4. The Other Half (Pottstown, Pennsylvania) - "A Lot to Live For" 2:53
5. The Iron Gate (Philadelphia, Pennsylvania)- "Feelin' Bad"
6. John Does (Los Angeles, California) - "One Kind Favor" 1:46
7. The Zoo (Milwaukee, Wisconsin) - "Sometimes" 2:14
8. The Young Monkey Men (Trenton, New Jersey) - "I Believed You" 2:11
9. The Shaynes (Lancaster, Pennsylvania) - "From My Window" 2:43
10. The Riots (Chicago, Illinois) - "I Can Go On" 2:39
11. The Jagged Edge (U.S.A.) - "How Many Times" 2:35
12. The Sinders (McMinville, Tennessee) - "Get Out of My Life" 1:33
13. The Intruders (St. Louis, Missouri) - "I'll Go On" 2:37
14. The New Breeds (Columbus, Ohio) - "Girl In Love" 3:01
15. The Chargers (Wenatchee, Washington) - "I'm So Alone" 3:22
16. Three From Three (Tennessee) - "Sad Lovers (Live Today)" 2:54
17. The Amberjacks (Baldwin, New York) - "Blue Jaunt" 3:29
18. The Specters (Worcester, Massachusetts) - "Depression" 3:07

== Catalogue and release information ==
- Record (LP-TS-6606, 1998)
- Compact Disc (CD-TS-6606, 1998)
