= Last of the Garage Punk Unknowns =

Last of the Garage Punk Unknowns (series)

Compilation album series by various artists
- Released: 2015–2016
- Recorded: 1960s
- Genre: Garage rock; psychedelic
- Label: Crypt

Last of the Garage Punk Unknowns is a series compilation albums of 1960s garage rock created and compiled by Tim Warren and released by Crypt Records in 2015 and 2016. The series consists of a total of eight LP's (volumes 1 through 8) and four CD's which each combine each of the corresponding LP's onto one compact disc (volumes 1&2, 3&4, 5&6, and 7&8). Like Crypt Records' Back from the Grave series, the Last of the Garage Punk Unknowns entries include the raw and aggressive numbers characterized by the use of fuzztone-distorted guitars and rough vocals, yet the songs tend to be more melodic and inclusive of the diversity of the genre. As indicated on the front sleeves, most of the songs were recorded by American groups, between 1965 and 1967. The series tends to follow the packaging format established by the Back from the Grave series in that each volume includes detailed liner notes that include basic information about each song and group, such as origin and recording date. The albums also include photographs of included groups, and cover artwork reflects the mid-1960s style graphic presentation popular on record sleeves of the time.

== Albums ==
=== LP series ===
- Last of the Garage Punk Unknowns, Volume 1
- Last of the Garage Punk Unknowns, Volume 2
- Last of the Garage Punk Unknowns, Volume 3
- Last of the Garage Punk Unknowns, Volume 4
- Last of the Garage Punk Unknowns, Volume 5
- Last of the Garage Punk Unknowns, Volume 6
- Last of the Garage Punk Unknowns, Volume 7
- Last of the Garage Punk Unknowns, Volume 8

=== CD series ===
- Last of the Garage Punk Unknowns, Volumes 1 & 2
- Last of the Garage Punk Unknowns, Volumes 3 & 4
- Last of the Garage Punk Unknowns, Volumes 5 & 6
- Last of the Garage Punk Unknowns, Volumes 7 & 8

== See also ==
- Crypt Records
- Back from the Grave (series)
- Nuggets (series)
- Pebbles (series)
- List of garage rock bands
- Garage rock
