= Teenage Shutdown! (series) =

Compilation album series by Various Artists
- Released: 1998–2000
- Recorded: 1960s
- Genre: Garage rock folk rock psychedelic rock
- Label: Crypt

Teenage Shutdown! is a series of garage rock compilation albums assembled by Tim Warren of Crypt Records, best known for his Back from the Grave series. Most of the volumes in the Teenage Shutdown! series, gravitate towards the more raw and aggressive examples of the genre, but some volumes also reflect different aspects of garage rock, such as frat rock, soul-influenced rock, as well as folk rock and psychedelic. The series currently consists of fifteen LP's and CD's, which unlike the Back from the Grave series, are identical in both formats. The first ten installments were released in 1998 and the remainder in 1999 and 2000. The first volume Jump, Jive and Harmonize, was culled from the collection of 45-rpm singles owned by Mike Markesich (colloquially referred to as "Moptop Mike"). The series tends to follow the packaging format employed by other garage compilation series such as Pebbles and Back from the Grave: each volume includes detailed liner notes, for this series written by Mike Markesich, which include basic information about each song and group, such as origin and recording date. The information that they present reflects thorough research, including information about the circumstances of the recordings and brief biographical sketches of the groups. The various albums in the series occasionally include photographs of groups not actually included on the track listings, sometimes even going as far as to have such bands pictured on the front sleeves. Currently, there are fifteen volumes in the series.

== Albums ==
- Teenage Shutdown! Jump, Jive & Harmonize (LP-TS 6601, 1998) (CD-TS6601, 1995)
- Teenage Shutdown! You Treated Me Bad! (LP-TS 6602, 1998) (CD-TS 6602, 1995)
- Teenage Shutdown! Things Been Bad (LP-6603, 1998) (CD-TS 6603, 1998)
- Teenage Shutdown! I'm a No-Count (LP-TS-6604, 1998) (CD-6604, 1998)
- Teenage Shutdown! Nobody to Love (LP-TS 6605, 1995) (CD-TS 6605, 1998)
- Teenage Shutdown! I'm Down Today (LP-TS-6606, 1998) (CD-TS-6606, 1998)
- Teenage Shutdown! Get a Move On!!! (LP-TS-6607, 1998) (CD-TS-6607)
- Teenage Shutdown! She'll Hurt You in the End (LP-TS-6608, 1995) (CD-TS-6608, 1998)
- Teenage Shutdown! Teen Jangler Blowout! (LP-TS-6609, 1998) (CD-TS-6609, 1998)
- Teenage Shutdown! The World Ain't Round, It's Square! (LP-TS-6610, 1998) (CD-TS-6610, 1998)
- Teenage Shutdown! "Move It!" (LP-TS-6611, 2000) (CD-TS-6611, 2000)
- Teenage Shutdown! "No Tease..." (LP-TS-6612, 2000) (CD-TS-6612, 2000)
- Teenage Shutdown! "I'm Gonna Stay" (LP-TS-6613, 2000) (CD-TS-6613, 2000)
- Teenage Shutdown! "Howlin' for My Darlin'"' (LP-TS-6614, 2000) (CD-TS-6614, 2000)
- Teenage Shutdown! "She's a Pest"! (LP-TS-6615, 2000) (CD-TS-6615, 2000)
