= The Outsiders (Tampa band) =

American garage rock band (1964–1966)

- Origin: Tampa, Florida, United States
- Genre: Garage rock
- Years active: 1964–1966
- Labels: Knight; Providence
- Past members: Hardy Dyal; Buddy Richardson; Ronnie Vaskovsky; Ronny Elliott; Spencer Hinkle; John Delise

The Outsiders were an American garage rock band from Tampa, Florida who were active in the 1960s. They are not to be confused with the better-known group, the Outsiders, from Cleveland, Ohio, nor with The Outsiders from the Netherlands, both of whom were active at the same time.

The band was formed in 1964 in Tampa, Florida. Their initial lineup consisted of Hardy Dyal on lead vocals, Buddy Richardson and Ronnie Vaskovsky on guitars, Ronny Elliott, formerly of local group the Raveons, on bass, and Spencer Hinkle, previously of the Tropics, on drums. They became a popular local act and in 1965 went to Tampa's H&H Avenue Studios to cut their debut single, "She's Coming On Stronger" b/w "Just Let Me Be," released on Knight Records.

In 1966 the band replaced Hardy Dyal with John Delise as their new lead vocalist and proceeded to record their rendition of Eddie Cochran's "Summertime Blues." The record became a big hit regionally. They signed with Providence Records, a subsidiary of Laurie Records, who persuaded them to change their name to avoid legal conflicts of interest which could arise out of the use of the same name by other better-known bands, such as The Outsiders from Cleveland, who scored a smash hit that year with "Time Won't Let Me" and the Dutch band of the same name featuring singer Wally Tax, as well as a host of other acts using the name. Upon urging of Providence Records, the band changed their name to the Soul Trippers and proceeded to record a version of Slim Harpo's "I'm a King Bee" released in July as a single backed with a Byrdsy "Set You Free This Time." The record did well, selling over 20,000 copies, until it was discovered that the members of the band who were using the term "soul" in their moniker were in fact white, causing numerous stations to pull the song from their playlists—a situation that hastened the band's demise. By the end of 1966 they had broken up.

Buddy Richardson and Ronny Elliott went on play in Noah's Ark, which released two singles for Decca Records. DeLise became the lead singer for the Rovin' Flames, and replaced Hardy Dyal there, just as he had done in the Outsiders. Buddy Richardson went on to play in White Witch. Ronnie Vaslovsky died on January 12, 2004. In the intervening years since their breakup, the Outsiders' work has come to the attention of garage rock collectors and enthusiasts. "She's Coming on Stronger" is included on the 1983 Back from the Grave, Volume 2 compilation put out by Crypt Records.

== Membership ==
=== 1965 ===
- Hardy Dial (lead vocals)
- Buddy Richardson (guitar)
- Ronnie Vaslovsky (guitars)
- Ronny Elliott (bass)
- Spencer Hinkle (drums)

=== 1966 ===
- John Delise (lead vocals)
- Buddy Richardson (guitar)
- Ronnie Vaslovsky (guitars)
- Ronny Elliott (bass)
- Spencer Hinkle (drums)

== Discography ==
- "She's Coming on Stronger" b/w "Just Let Me Be" (Knight 103, January 1966)
- "Summertime Blues" b/w "Set You Free This Time" (Knight 104, April 1966)
- "King Bee" b/w "Girl of Mine" (as the Soul Trippers) (Providence 415, July 1966)
