= Teenage Shutdown! Teen Jangler Blowout! =

Compilation album
- Released: December 29, 1998
- Recorded: 1960s
- Genres: Garage rock; psychedelic; folk rock
- Length: 43:42
- Label: Crypt

chronology
Teenage Shutdown! She'll Hurt You in the End (1998)	Teenage Shutdown! Teen Jangler Blowout! (1998)	Teenage Shutdown! The World Ain't Round, It's Square! (1998)

Teenage Shutdown! Teen Jangler Blowout!, sometimes referred to as "Volume 9," is the ninth installment in the Teenage Shutdown! series of garage rock compilations put out by Tim Warren of Crypt Records, which is available on both LP and compact disc formats. This volume was released on December 29, 1998 and consists of primarily rocking and upbeat songs, as indicated by the sub-heading which reads "Cool Teen Clang n' Jangle Lowdown." Like all of the entries in the series, the collection was compiled and mastered by Warren, using original 45 rpm records selected from the collection of noted garage rock archivist, Mike Markesich (colloquially known as "Mop Top Mike").

The set begins with "I'll Be In," by the Answer, from Berkeley, California, who recorded the song in 1965 for the White Whale label. "The Burgundy Runn, from Albuquerque, New Mexico, follow with "Stop." "Just Won't Leave" was recorded by the Mad Hatters, of Stamford Connecticut, and written by their youngest member, who was only 13 years old at the time. Allentown, Pennsylvania's the Kings Ransom perform "Shame." The Young Aristocracy, from Tulsa, Oklahoma sing "Don't Lie." "Trip to New Orleans" is by the Bees from Los Angeles, which was the flip side to "Voices Green and Purple," which was released on the Liverpool label in 1966. Warden & His Fugitives' "The World Ain't Changed" bears an uncanny resemblance to the Rolling Stones' "Satisfaction." The final track is by the Fab Four (not to be confused with the Beatles), who perform "I'm Always Doing Something Wrong."

== Track listing ==
1. The Answer (Berkeley, California): "I'll Be In" - 2:34
2. The Burgundy Runn (Albuquerque, New Mexico): "Stop!" - 2:04
3. Jack & the Beanstalks (Milwaukee, Wisconsin): "So Many Times" - 2:23
4. The Jackson Investment Co. (Lakeland, Florida): "Not This Time" - 2:03
5. The Kings Ransom (Allentown, Pennsylvania): "Shame" - 2:08
6. Mad Hatters (Stamford, Connecticut): "Just Won't Leave" - 3:24
7. The JuJus (Grand Rapids, Michigan): "I'm Really Sorry" - 2:18
8. The Fortune Seekers (Norwalk, California): "Why I Cry" - 2:29
9. The Bees (Covina, California): "Trip to New Orleans" - 1:54
10. The Sleepers (Mansfield, Ohio): "I Want A Love" - 2:30
11. The Young Aristocracy (Tulsa, Oklahoma): "Don't Lie" - 3:08
12. Sir Michael & The Sounds (Clearwater, Florida): "Can You" - 2:08
13. Warden & His Fugitives (San Bernardino, California); "The World Ain't Changed" - 2:40
14. The Jackson Investment Co. (Lakeland, Florida): "What Can I Do?" - 2:22
15. The Zone V (Shickshinny, Pennsylvania): "I Cannot Lie" - 2:45
16. Disillusioned Younger Generation (U.S.A.): "Who Do You Think You're Foolin'" - 3:06
17. The Fab Four (Kansas City, Missouri): "I'm Always Doing Something Wrong" - 3:00

== Catalogue and release information ==
- Record (LP-TS-6609, 1998)
- Compact disc (CD-TS-6609, 1998)
