= Teenage Shutdown! "Move It!" =

Compilation album
- Released: October 10, 2000
- Genre: Garage rock; frat rock
- Length: 44:59
- Label: Crypt

chronology
Teenage Shutdown! The World Ain't Round, It's Square! (1998)	Teenage Shutdown! "Move It!" (2000)	Teenage Shutdown! "No Tease..." (2000)

Teenage Shutdown! "Move It!", sometimes referred to as "Volume 11," is the eleventhth installment in the Teenage Shutdown! series of garage rock compilations put out by Tim Warren of Crypt Records, which is available on both LP and compact disc formats. This volume was released on October 10, 2000 and consists of primarily raucous up-tempo numbers and frat rock as indicated by the subheadings which read "Frantic Frat-Stomp Fracas" and "Revved-up & Rowdy Rockers." Like all of the entries in the series, the collection was compiled and mastered by Warren, using original 45 rpm records selected from the collection of noted garage rock archivist, Mike Markesich (colloquially known as "Mop Top Mike").

The set begins with Peck's Bad Boys from New York City who sing "Crazy World," offering up a spirited tonic for life's unavoidable problems. The set features several raucous cover versions of other artists' songs. The Deadlys from Columbus, Ohio do a rendition of Bob Dylan's "On the Road Again" and the Retreds from Acton, Massachusetts try their hand at Chuck Berry's oft-covered "Johnny B. Goode," while the Buccaneers perform Jesse Hill's R&B classic "Oop Poo Pah Doo," which includes a passage lifted from the Isley Brothers' "Nobody but You." The compilation also includes originally-written songs. "One More Time," is performed by the Reason Why, from Ocala, Florida. The last two songs, "Let's Go in '69" by the Customs Five and "Lollipop" by the Royal Coachmen, are each performed by bands of unknown origin and both feature titles which jokingly toy with hinted-at forms of forbidden self-gratification.

== Track listing ==
1. Peck's Bad Boys (New York, New York): "Crazy World" 2:37
2. The Deadlys (Columbus, Ohio): "On the Road Again" 1:53
3. The Stompers (Mount Vernon, Indiana): "I Know" 2:49
4. The Buccaneers (Ashtabula, Ohio): "Oop Poo Pah Doo" 2:06
5. Dave and the Stone Hearts (Troy, Ohio): "Slow Down" 2:40
6. The Individuals (Danville, Virginia): "I Want Love" 2:35
7. The Chevron's V (Grand Rapids, Michigan): "Niat Pac Lavram" 1:46
8. The Retreds (Acton, Massachusetts): "Johnny B. Goode" 3:05
9. The Twiliters (Plattsburgh, New York): "Move It" 2:47
10. The Shondells (Rio Linda, California): "Something's Got a Hold on Me" 2:41
11. The Reason Why (Ocala, Florida): "One More Time" 2:16
12. The Excels (U.S.A.): "Let's Dance" 2:09
13. The Creations (Milford, Connecticut): "Don't Be Mean" 2:08
14. The Creations (Florida): "True Love - Heartaches" 1:51
15. Bill Tatman & the Rampagers (Portsmouth, Ohio): "What's Wrong with You" 2:20
16. The Galaxies (Garland, Texas): "Gitchy-Gitchy-Goo" 2:11
17. The Banshees (Burlingame, California): "Take a Ride with Me" 2:23
18. The Customs Five (U.S.A.): "Let's Go In '69" 2:05
19. The Royal Coachmen (U.S.A): "Lollipop" 2:37

== Catalogue and release information ==
- Record (LP-TS-6611, 1998)
- Compact disc (CD-TS-6611, 1998)
