= The Paragons (Charlotte band) =

American garage rock band

Background information
- Origin: Charlotte, North Carolina, U.S.
- Genres: Garage rock; folk rock; pop
- Years active: 1965–1968
- Label: Bobbi
- Past members: Bobby Pace; Johnny Pace; Tim Moore; Pat Walters; Danny Huntley; Jim Charles; Kirk Mitchell

The Paragons were an American garage rock band from Charlotte, North Carolina, who were active in the 1960s. They became one of the most popular groups in the Charlotte area during the time and had a major regional hit with the song "Abba", which is now regarded as a garage rock classic. Guitarist Pat Walters later became a member of bands such as The Good the Bad and the Ugly and Jeremiah, as well as the Spongetones.

== History ==
=== Origins ===
The Paragons were founded as the Pagans in Charlotte, North Carolina, in 1965. Like so many bands of the time they were inspired by the Beatles and the British Invasion. Bands such as the Rolling Stones, the Yardbirds, and the Hollies were key influences on their sound. The group's initial lineup included Tim Moore on guitar and Kirk Mitchell, bass. Mitchell left the group shortly thereafter, and brothers Bobby and Johnny Pace joined. Johnny Pace now sang most of the band's vocals assumed the role of drummer, while his younger brother Bobby took over the role of playing bass. Tim Moore switched to organ. Danny Huntley joined the group on guitar. Jim Charles, from Texas who earlier relocated with his family to Charlotte and played in another Charlotte band, the Abbadons, joined on guitar for several months and brought with him a song which he and his brother, Bill, wrote while living in Texas called "Abba" that went on to become a part of the Paragons' repertoire and which they eventually recorded in modified form without Charles.

Worried about the possibility that using a controversial moniker might cause the band to lose church gigs and elsewhere, the group decided to change their name from the Pagans to the Paragons. Bobby and Johnny Pace's mother helped them find the new name when looking in a thesaurus and noticing the word "paragon" not far below "pagan" on the page. The band voted to use that as their new name. The Paragons would use the recreation room located in a small house in the backyard of Mr. and Mrs Paces' house for rehearsals. It had a pool table and everyone called it "the pool house." Le Roy Pace, Bobby and Johnny's father was a TV repairman who moved the band's equipment around in his Ford truck. The band eventually purchased a used hearse. Danny Huntley was the oldest member of the group and had a driver's license, so he operated the vehicle. Like many other bands in the Charlotte area, they bought instruments from Reliable Music, a music store selling new instruments run by Melvin Cohen that was located in the back of a pawn shop owned by his father. The Paragons played at several local teen clubs such as the Spyder (located at the YMCA in Charlotte), the Straggle Inn (at Myers Park Methodist Church) and the Tin Can (at Christ Episcopal Church), and the Web. The group occasionally played at the Park Road Shopping Center and on other occasions the local National Guard armory. The Paragons quickly became one of the most popular bands in the Charlotte area, making strong impressions at various battles of the bands in 1966, such as one sponsored by radio station WAYS and another held at the Charlotte Coliseum. The song "Abba" now figured prominently in the band's performances. Other popular bands in the area were the Barons, whose membership included future member of the Paragons Pat Walters on guitar, and the Young Ages, the Hodads, and the Die Hards, who sometimes played at some of the same venues, as well as the Grifs, the Stoaways, and T.C. Atlantic (not to be confused with the Minnesota band of the same name. The Tamrons, from Concord were another competitor. Jim Charles eventually left the group and returned to the Abbadons, following a personal dispute with Bobby Pace over a girlfriend.

The Paragons appeared on several local TV shows such as Kilgo's Canteen, a teen dance show, and Granny Goes Grooving, a "how to" instructional program on how to start a band and play music. The TV appearance for which they are best-remembered was on The Village Square, which was taped at WBTV in Charlotte, but syndicated nationally in over fifty markets.

=== Recording and regional success ===
The band brought in Pat Walters, previously of another local group, the Barons, to replace Charles on guitar. Walters was already a good friend of organist Tim Moore and immediately bonded with the other members of the band. He was considered one of the best young guitar players in Charlotte. The Barons earlier attempted to recruit Bobby Pace on vocals, but Pace preferred to stay in the Paragons. The Paragons met Bobbie Cashman, a 24-year-old woman, who became their manager. In late 1966, the group went to Arthur Smith Studios in Charlotte where James Brown had recently recorded "Papa's Got a Brand New Bag" to cut the single for "Abba" backed with their version of the Yardbirds' "Mister, You're a Better Man Than I", which was released in January 1967 on their private-pressing label, Bobbi (Bobbitown Music), named after their manager Barbara (Bobbi) Cashman. The version the Paragons recorded differed lyrically from the original composition by the Charles brothers and had a more pop-oriented arrangement. The producer for the session was Manny Clark, an African American DJ for the black radio station WGIV. Dave Long, a friend of the band, sat in for the session and played tambouring on both tracks. He lent Pat Walters a 12-string electric guitar to play for occasion which can be hard in the distinctive arpeggiated guitar riffs in "Abba".

"Abba" became a huge hit in the Charlotte area and received airplay throughout the Southeast. It even received airplay on black radio station WGIV, perhaps due to DJ Manny Clark's involvement with the record. According to Gill Vanderlip, member of local band the Losse Screws, "Abba" was "the 'I Wanna Hold Your Hand' of Charlotte, North Carolina". The song's authorship became a matter of contention. The wording on the label of the original pressing credited the song to Daniel Huntley and Johnny Pace, but did not mention former member Jim Charles and his brother and Bill, the song's original composers. When Charles noticed the omission, he went to band member Danny Huntley's house to inquire about the matter, and when he arrived, the group's manager Bobbi Cashman happened to be there that moment. She was not aware of their role in the authorship and sent Charles a copy of the BMI registration form which listed both he and his brother as writers along with Pace and Huntley, thus enabling them to share royalties.

The Paragons opened for the Hollies and Herman's Hermits when those bands played in Charlotte. The Paragons appeared on local TV shows such as Kilgo's Canteen and Granny Goes Grooving, but the appearance for which they are best-remembered was when they played "Abba" on The Village Square, a nationally syndicated show taped at WBTV in Charlotte in early 1967. Johnny Pace had earlier introduced members of the Villagers, the show's house band, to the other members of the Paragons, and they became friends, and it was through this connection that the Paragons were invited to play on the show. Another local band, the Catalinas, also appeared on the same episode and taped their performance the same day.

=== Demise and later developments ===
The Paragons did not issue any more singles, so were unable to capitalize on the momentum of "Abba's" success. In the summer of 1968, they appeared in a battle of the bands held at Freedom Park in Charlotte. That summer Pat Walters left the group. He went on to play in another band, Good the Bad and the Ugly (GBU), who would become one of Charlotte's most popular acts of the late 1960s and early 1970s. Danny Huntley also left the group to attend Wake Forest University and study medicine. The Paragons broke up later that year.

After the demise of Good the Bad and the Ugly, Pat Walters went on to play lead guitar in Jeremiah, whose ranks included which future Wings drummer Denny Seiwell and session guitarist, Dave Spinosa, both of whom played on Paul McCartney's Ram album. He later joined successful 1980s pop rock group the Spongetones. Bobby Pace went on to play in a local band called the New Mix and eventually followeded in the footsteps of his father and became a TV repairman. In recent years there has been a revival if interest in the Paragons work amongst garage rock enthusiasts and collectors. Their song, "Abba" now considered a garage rock classic and "Abba" is included on compilations such as Teenage Shutdown! Nobody to Love, Le Beat Bespoke Volume 3, and Tobacco-a-Go-Go Volume 2. Their version of "Mr. You're a better man than I appears on the Bury My Body compilation. Johnny Pace died in the 1987 and his brother Bobby Pace died in 2009.

== Membership ==
- Johnny Pace (lead vocals and drums)
- Bobby Pace (bass)
- Tim Moore (organ, earlier drums)
- Pat Walters (guitar)
- Danny Huntley (guitar)
- Jim Charles (guitar)
- Kirk Mitchell (bass)

== Discography ==
- "Abba" b/w "Mister You're a Better Man Than I" (Bobbi 7-7352, January 1967)

== Bibliography ==
- Berger, Jacob; Coston, Daniel (2013). There Was a Time: Rock & Roll in the 1960s in Charlotte and North Carolina (1st ed.). Charlotte: Fort Canoga Press. ISBN 978-0-615-80940-3.
