= Teenage Shutdown! "I'm Gonna Stay" =

Compilation album
- Released: February 11, 2000
- Recorded: 1966–1969
- Genre: Garage rock
- Length: 41:53
- Label: Crypt

chronology
Teenage Shutdown! "No Tease..." (2000)	Teenage Shutdown! "I'm Gonna Stay" (2000)	Teenage Shutdown! "Howlin' for My Darlin'" (2000)

Teenage Shutdown! "I'm Gonna Stay," sometimes referred to as "Volume 13," is the thirteenth installment in the Teenage Shutdown! series of garage rock compilations put out by Tim Warren of Crypt Records, which is available on both LP and compact disc formats. This volume was released on February 11, 2000 and consists of primarily raw and harder up-tempo songs, often featuring fuzz-toned guitars, as indicated by the two sub-headings which read "Target: Fuzz" and "17 Fuzz-Drenched Rarities: 1966-1969" The Moxies from Paducah, Kentucky, are pictured of the front cover and perform the title track, "I'm Gonna Stay." Like all of the entries in the series, the collection was compiled and mastered by Warren, using original 45 rpm records selected from the collection of noted garage rock archivist, Mike Markesich (colloquially known as "Mop Top Mike").

The set begins with "I've Got a Feeling," by the Mondels from Georgia, who appear again on the thirteenth track, "You'll Never Come Back To Stay". Wanderers' Rest, from Milwaukee, Wisconsin perform "Anytime an Anywhere." Other highlights include "Dance Girl Dance, "Greg Barr & the Barr Association, from Houston and "Love and Kisses" by Lou Capri, from Chicago, which features a fuzzed-drenched guitar solo. The most downcast song on the album is by the Sceptres from Glen Ellyn, Illinois, who perform the despairing folk and blues-influenced lament, "But I Can Dream." Arkansas' the Rock Garden are heard playing the upbeat "Super Stuff." The final track is "Last Night," by the Night Mist from Tennessee.

== Track listing ==
1. The Mondels (Georgia): "I Got a Feeling" 2:03
2. Mongrell's Band (Oneonta, Alabama): "Be My Girl" 1:59
3. The Wanderer's Rest (Milwaukee, Wisconsin): "Anytime Anywhere" 2:15
4. The Peabody Hermitage (Chattanooga, Tennessee): "Something So" 2:48
5. The Modds (Poplar Bluff, Missouri): "Leave My House" 2:57
6. The Sceptres (Glen Ellyn, Illinois): "But I Can Dream" 3:43
7. Greg Barr and the Barr Association (Houston, Texas): "Dance Girl Dance" 2:46
8. The Great Society (Villa Park, Illinois): "I'm the One for You" 2:20
9. Oscar and the Majestics (Gary, Indiana): "Got to Have Your Lovin'" 2:35
10. Ides (Milford, Delaware): "Psychedelic Ride" 2:17
11. The Grains of Time (Albertville, Alabama): "No Matter What They Say" 2:05
12. Lou Capri (Chicago, Illinois): "Love and Kisses" 2:00
13. The Mondels (Georgia): "You'll Never Come Back to Stay" 1:44
14. The Rock Garden (Camden, Arkansas): "Super Stuff" 2:21
15. The Moxies (Paducah, Kentucky): "I'm Gonna Stay" 2:38
16. The Black Banana (Bradford, Pennsylvania): "Listen Girl" 3:20
17. The Night Mist (Tennessee): "Last Night" 2:08

== Catalogue and release information ==
- Record (LP-TS-6613, 2000)
- Compact disc (CD-TS-6613, 2000)
