= Teenage Shutdown! Get a Move On!!! =

Compilation album
- Released: December 29, 1998
- Recorded: 1960s
- Genre: Garage rock; folk rock
- Length: 43:45
- Label: Crypt

chronology
Teenage Shutdown! I'm Down Today (1998)	Teenage Shutdown! Get a Move On!!! (1998)	Teenage Shutdown! She'll Hurt You in the End (1998)

Teenage Shutdown! Get a Move On!!! (subtitled Snarl & Stomp, Rave & Rant Teen Garage Hoot) is a compilation album featuring garage and folk rock musical artists that recorded in the 1960s. It is the seventh installment of the Teenage Shutdown! series and was released on Crypt Records on December 29, 1998.

According to the compilation album's liner notes, the songs were recorded between 1966 and 1967, and this collection dates from 1966 and 1967 and "serves up a solid batch of top-shelf Kinks-meets-Raiders-inspired oompf that flows like a mofo". Musical highlights include the opening title track, which is a Beatles-influenced pop rock written by former Cricket Niki Sullivan and recorded by the Soul Inc. Additional tracks include the soulful "I'm Alright" by the Spades, and complex organ instrumentals prominent in Yesterday's Children's "Feelings" and the Missing Lynx's rendition of the Paul Revere and the Raiders tune "Louie Go Home". Unlike typical compilations, the set list concludes with more regarded songs such as the Rogues' bass-heavy "Put You Down", the Vaqueros psychedelic-tinged "Growing Pains", and a fast-paced pop number, "Stand There", by the Dave Starky Five.

== Track listing ==
1. Soul Inc. - "You Better Get a Move On" (Los Angeles, CA, U.S.A.)
2. The Spades - "I'm Alright" (Winter Park, FL, U.S.A.)
3. The Bare Facts - "Watch Your Step"
4. The Third Evolution - "Don't Play with Me" (Bronx, NY, U.S.A.)
5. The Chessmen - "You Can't Catch Me" (Fort Wayne, IN, U.S.A.)
6. The Checkmates - "Get It While You Can" (Cincinnati, OH, U.S.A.)
7. The Black Watch - "Left Behind" (Cedar Springs, MI, U.S.A.)
8. The Monarchs - "You've Got Love" (Jacksonville, FL, U.S.A.)
9. Yesterday's Children - "Feelings" (NY, U.S.A.)
10. The Rogues - "Put You Down" (Lafayette, LA, U.S.A.)
11. The Missing Lynx - "Louie Go Home" (Lawrenceburg, TN, U.S.A.)
12. The Roots - "It's Been a Long Journey" (Greenville, SC, U.S.A.)
13. The Vaqueros - "Growing Pains" (Virginia, MN, U.S.A.)
14. The Starlites - "Wait for Me" (TN, U.S.A.)
15. The Dave Starky Five - "Stand There" (Houston, TX, U.S.A.)
16. The War-Babies - "Jeanie's Pub" (Los Angeles, CA, U.S.A.)
17. The New Things - "The Only Woman You Can Trust" (Mom) (Albuquerque, NM, U.S.A.)
18. The Zoo - "You're Gonna Miss Me" (Milwaukee, WI, U.S.A.)
