= Teenage Shutdown! The World Ain't Round, It's Square! =

Compilation album
- Released: December 29, 1998
- Recorded: 1960s
- Genre: Garage rock
- Length: 41:59
- Label: Crypt

chronology
Teenage Shutdown! Teen Jangler Blowout! (1998)	Teenage Shutdown! The World Ain't Round, It's Square! (1998)	Teenage Shutdown! "Move It!" (1998)

Teenage Shutdown!: The World Ain't Round, It's Square, sometimes referred to as Volume 10, is the tenth installment in the Teenage Shutdown! series of garage rock compilations put out by Tim Warren of Crypt Records, which is available on both LP and compact disc formats. This volume was released on December 29, 1998 and is composed largely of harder rocking fast-tempo material as indicated in the sub-heading below the title which reads, "17 Paint Peeling Garage Punk Monsters!!!" Like all of the entries in the series, the collection was compiled and mastered by Warren, using original 45 rpm records selected from the collection of noted garage rock archivist, Mike Markesich (colloquially known as "Mop Top Mike"). The packaging includes liner notes providing information about the songs and bands.

The collection features songs by acts such as Paul Bearer & the Hearsemen form Albany, Oregon (pictured on the front cover abusing their instruments), who perform the opening cut, "I've Been Thinking." Larry and the Blue Notes form Fort Worth, Texas are heard on the fuzz-drenched "In and Out." Other tracks include The Chessmen's "I Need You There," "She's the One" by Dr. Spec's Optical Illusion, and "Pretty Little Thing" by the Deepest Blues. The set closes with "Fall of the Queen" by Destiny's Children.

== Track listing ==
1. Paul Bearer & the Hearsemen (Albany, Oregon) - "I've Been Thinking" 2:42
2. Shepherd's Heard (Mansfield-Shelby, Ohio) - "I Know" 2:48
3. The Stoics (San Antonio, Texas) - "Hate" 2:25
4. Larry and the Blue Notes (Fort Worth, Texas) - "In and Out" 1:58
5. Nomads (Mt. Airy, North Carolina) - "From Zero Down" 2:31
6. Triumphs (Ashtabula, Ohio) - "Lovin' Cup" 2:10
7. The Oxfords (Tulsa, Oklahoma) - "I Ain't Done Wrong" 3:30
8. The Deepest Blue (Pomona, California) - "The Pretty Little Thing" 2:40
9. Heathens (Schenectady, New York) - "Problems" 2:20
10. Chessmen (Dallas, Texas) - "I Need You There" 2:29
11. Bards (Fort Worth, Texas) - "Alibis" 2:03
12. Dr. Spec's Optical Illusion (New Orleans, Louisiana) - "She's the One" 2:09
13. Sound Barrier (Salem, Ohio) - "Hey Hey" 2:35
14. Mods (Toledo, Ohio) - "I Give You an Inch" 2:47
15. The Savages (Bermuda) - "The World Ain't Round It's Square" 2:50
16. Wrong Numbers (Mount Dora, Florida) "I'm Gonna Go Now" 1:35
17. Destiny's Children (Houston, Texas) - "Fall of the Queen" 2:01

== Catalogue and release information ==
- Record (LP-TS-6610, 1998)
- Compact disc (CD-TS-6610, 1998)
