= Allentown Anglophile =

Compilation album
- Released: April 15, 2005
- Recorded: 1960s, 1970s
- Genre: Garage rock
- Length: 52:47
- Label: Distortions
- Producers: Dave Brown, Dave Peifley

chronology
Allentown Anglophile (2005)	Absolutely Allentown (2005)

Allentown Anglophile is a compilation album featuring American garage rock bands that were formed in Allentown, Pennsylvania, and active in the 1960s and 1970s. The album compiles various tracks taken from rare singles, original master tapes, and unreleased material that were previously only made available to few garage rock enthusiasts. It is the first installment of albums related to the Allentown garage rock scene, and was released on Distortions Records on April 15, 2005.

The concept of Allentown Anglophile was initiated in April 2002 by Bob Dougherty when he approached the owner of 19th Street Records, Dave Peifley, with recordings of his former Allentown garage band the Kings Ransom, which had a brief brush of fame with their single "Shame". Peifley was also inspired to seek out original singles, reel-to-reels, and acetate recordings of other Allentown bands, and soon realized there was enough material to configure an entire compilation album. Speaking about the significance of the album, Peifley said, "I wanted to make sure that even if we were overlooked commercially, we were not overlooked historically". With the assistance of Distortions Records record producer Dave Brown, the raw fidelity of the songs are preserved by digitally mastering the recordings directly from a turntable.

Music on the album mostly derives from original material which was influenced by a mix of British Invasion groups, psychedelia, and pop. The Allentown scene was a bustling one, with the bands performing in several teen dance clubs such as the Mad Hatter and the Purple Owl in Allentown, King Arthur's Court outside Quakertown, and the Mod Mill near Center Valley, Pennsylvania. The Shillings are the most thoroughly represented musical act on Allentown Anglophile with seven of the group's vocally-harmonized pop songs, such as their regional hit, "Lying and Trying". Another musical highlight includes the Kings Ransom's offering, "Without You", a psychedelia-driven song influenced by Philadelphia group Mandrake Memorial. Outside the garage scene, D.B.I.L.T.Y. provides an insight into the rise of glam rock in the mid-1970s.

The Jay and the Techniques recordings are radio commercial advertisements sponsoring Coca-Cola. In total, 1,000 copies of Allentown Anglophile were originally pressed, and the album is readily available on iTunes.

== Track listing ==
1. The Kings Ransom: "Shame"
2. The Kings Ransom: "Here Today, Gone Tomorrow"
3. The Kings Ransom: "Unknown to Me"
4. The Kings Ransom: "Without You"
5. The Limits: "He'll Make You Cry"
6. The Limits: "The Key"
7. The Limits: "I Lost What I Need"
8. Jay and the Techniques: "Soft Drink Commercial #1"
9. Jay and the Techniques: "Soft Drink Commercial #2"
10. The Shillings: "Laugh"
11. The Shillings: "Lying and Trying"
12. The Shillings: "Children and Flowers"
13. The Shillings: "The World Could Stop"
14. The Shillings: "Loving Spell"
15. The Shillings: "I'll Get to You"
16. The Shillings: "Seems Like Yesterday"
17. Dooley Invention: "Crimson Afternoon"
18. Dooley Invention: "No Time"
19. Bleu Grass: "What I Know"
20. D.B.L.I.T.Y.: "Go West Young Man"
21. D.B.L.I.T.Y.: "Cut My Hair Today"
