= The Kings Ransom =

American garage rock band from Pennsylvania

Background information
- Origin: Allentown, Pennsylvania, United States
- Genres: Garage rock
- Years active: 1965-1968
- Label: Integra
- Past members: Bob Dougherty; Vince Homick; Bob Werley; Scobie King; Ronnie Galland; Danny Roth; Glenn Zoski; Chuck Hoey

The Kings Ransom were an American garage rock band from Allentown, Pennsylvania who were active from 1965 to 1968 and were a popular act in the Lehigh Valley area, as well as around Philadelphia. Their record "Shame" became a hit in Milton, Pennsylvania and received airplay in Michigan. In the intervening years the Kings Ransom's music has come to the attention of garage rock enthusiasts with the release of several of their songs on compilations such as Allentown Anglophile and Teenage Shutdown! Teen Jangler Blowout!

== History ==
Kings Ransom were founded in 1965 in Allentown, Pennsylvania. The original lineup consisted of Bob Dougherty on lead vocals, Vince Homick on rhythm guitar, Bob Werley on lead guitar, Scobie King on bass, Ronnie Galland on keyboards, and Danny Roth on drums. Glenn Zoski later replaced King on bass and Chuck Hoey replaced Roth on drums. Mike Homick, owner of King Arthur's Court, in Quakertown, was the band's manager. The band was highly influenced by acts of the British Invasion such as the Beatles and the Rolling Stones. According to Bob Dougherty, "We were big on The Stones. That was our forte - doing a lot of Stones. People thought we did them really well. Werley did that on a 12-string through a Vox Super Beatle with a lot of mid-range. He was quite innovative at times." The Kings Ransom often played on the same bills as other Allentown groups such as the Hickeys, the Combenashuns at venues including the King Arthur's Court and The Lord's Estate (the other house band of King Arthur's Court and managed by Homick). The scene was competitive. Dougherty elaborates: "There were two stages at The Court. If there was another band across from you that was real good, it gave you the drive to be a little bit better. Joey Coloruso used to play down there with Quenn's Way Mersey". The King's Ransom also played numerous college fraternity gigs in nearby towns such in Drexel, Lafayette, Lehigh, and Bucknell. Dougherty has mentioned the band's rendition of Chris Kenner's "Land of 1000 Dances" as a highlight of their live shows. They were regular fixtures at the Purple Owl and the King's Court, and played occasionally at the Mod Mill, sometimes on the bill with Jerry Deane, and at the Mad Hatter, a club which specialized in soul music.

In 1966, the group taped a batch of demo recordings recorded by Pete Helfrich on location at a Greek Orthodox Church. Mike Homick arranged for some of the songs to be pressed on a 12-inch record at Allentown Records. Dougherty remembers, "That was before anything. That was never labeled. We sent some copies of that to record companies in New York and got some nice rejection letters. Nobody's ever heard that except people that knew us then. I don't even have a copy of that, but I'd like to". The band went to Frank Virtue Studio to cut their first official release on Integra Records, which was owned by radio disc jockeys Joe Mclaine (still on the air locally) and Bob Kratz. The resulting single's A-side, "Shame", featured arpeggiated 12-string guitar riffs played in odd scales and was backed with "Here Today Gone Tomorrow". The session proceeded rapidly. According to Dougherty: "We were there 'til about four o'clock in the morning! We started about nine o'clock at night - or eight thirty - and were done by four o'clock in the morning". The record was released in July 1967. "Shame" became a hit in Milton, Pennsylvania and received airplay in Michigan, but the record company did not have the means to distribute it nationally, except in certain regions. The group followed it up with "Shadows of Dawn" b/w "Streetcar" in November 1967. The Kings Ransom toured regionally, such as in Milton and Sunbury and played at the Four Seasons, a popular venue in the area. They did a show at Agricultural Hall ("Ag. Hall") in Allentown. The group continued playing for another year, but in June 1968 disbanded.

Dougherty left to join the Navy, where he served until 1971. Mike Homick formed another band using the name, the Kings Ransom, but that consisted of completely different members. In the intervening years the Kings Ransom's music has come to the attention of garage rock enthusiasts. Four of their songs appear on the Allentown Anglophile compilation released by the Philadelphia-based Distortion Records in 2005. Their song "Shame" is included on Teenage Shutdown! Teen Jangler Blowout!. Their complete body of work, including some of the unreleased demos recorded by Pete Helfrich, was issued on the self-titled The Kings Ransom anthology.

== Membership ==
- Bob Dougherty (lead vocals)
- Vince Homick (rhythm guitar)
- Bob Werley (lead guitar)
- Scobie King (bass)
- Ronnie Galland (keyboards)
- Danny Roth (drums)
- Glenn Zoski (bass)
- Chuck Hoey (drums)

== Discography ==
- "Shame" b/w "Here Today, Gone Tomorrow" (Integra 101, July 1967)
- "Shadows of Dawn" b/w "Streetcar" (Integra 102, November 1967)

== Bibliography ==
- Markesich, Mike (2012). Teenbeat Mayhem (1st ed.). Branford, Connecticut: Priceless Info Press. ISBN 978-0-985-64825-1.
