= The Rovin' Flames =

American garage rock band (1965–1969)

- Also known as: The Rovin' Things
- Origin: Tampa, Florida, United States
- Genres: Garage rock; blues rock
- Years active: 1965–1969
- Labels: Fuller; Decca
- Past members: Paul Battle; Jimmy "Mouse" Morris; J. R. Marietta; Jerry Goff; David Tabak; Hardy Dial; John DeLise; Eddie Taylor; John Rodgers; Robert Thompson

The Rovin' Flames were an American garage rock band formed in Tampa, Florida in 1965. Releasing five singles in their recording career, which was sometimes plagued by multiple line-up changes, the group is best-remembered for their final record "How Many More Times". The song was the Rovin' Flames biggest hit and remains their most accessible tune due to its appearances on several compilation albums.

== History ==
The band was formed in 1965 by Paul Battle (rhythm guitar and vocals), Jimmy "Mouse" Morris (lead guitar), J. R. Maietta (bass guitar), and Jerry Goff (drums). No older than 19 years old, the majority of the original members were still enrolled at George D. Chamberlain High School as the group was founded. In September 1965, the Rovin' Flames released their debut single on Fuller Records, a record label owned by businessman Charles Fuller. It included one of the earliest cover versions of the English rock band Them's "Gloria", pre-dating the Shadows of Knight's nationally successful rendition by nearly six months. On the B-side, the group featured their original instrumental piece "J.J.J.P.", which was inspired by the bass line in the tune "Louie, Louie".

In 1966, the Rovin' Flames recruited vocalist Hardy Dial, who formerly was the lead singer for fellow Tampa band the Outsiders. Although Dial's ex-group did not achieve the same notoriety as the Rovin' Flames, they did record two regionally popular singles for the Knight label which included their best known song, an interpretation of "Summertime Blues". In February 1966, the group released their follow-up single "I Can't", a tune written by record producer John Brumage. The notoriety stemming from the two records earned the Rovin' Flames the opportunity to record the rhythm tracks for deejay Brooke Chamberlain. Jeff Lemlich, a close associate of the band and former member of Tampa group Four Letter Words, wrote "I think Tampa Bay was Brooke Chamberlain’s label. He was a disc jockey on WALT Radio in Tampa, and as such had a lot of influence. So when he wanted to cut a record, bands like the Rovin’ Flames and Four Letter Words obliged". Chamberlain's songs included parodic surf rock tunes, with Chamberlain attempting to imitate the lyrical phrasing of the Beach Boys.

The Rovin' Flames' contributions to the Chamberlain recordings proved to be mutually beneficial to both parties as the deejay contributed lyrics to their ballad "Seven Million People". The song, which was released in June 1966, was inspired by the melody found in the Byrds' "I'll Feel a Whole Lot Better". Its popularity propelled the Rovin' Flames to regional prominence, cementing them as the backing group to the Dave Clark Five as they toured Florida. Multiple line-up changes to the group followed over the subsequent months, until the next version of the band saw replacements John DeLise as the lead vocalist and Eddie Taylor as the drummer. Keyboardist John Rodgers was also recruited to bolster the complexity of the group's sound. DeLise was already well known in Tampa for his previous work with the Outsiders, and the Soul Trippers, who scored regional hit with their cover of the Slim Harpo-penned blues standard "I'm a King Bee".

DeLise's connections with his former band as they evolved into the group Noah's Ark was invaluable to the writing of the Rovin' Flames next two songs for their fifth single. His ex-bandmate Helen Uncapher co-wrote the tunes "How Many More Times" and "Love Song #6", which were released on the nationally distributed label Decca Records in September 1967. Although it is generally considered to have been released too late to have been commercially successful, "How Many More Times" has since become the signature song for the Rovin' Flames. It has been reissued on compilation albums such as Pebbles, Volume 8 and Psychedelic States: Florida in the 60s, Volume 3. Afterwards, DeLise departed the group to join Those Five and was replaced by Robert Thompson. For a brief period, the band was alternately known as the Rovin' Things; however, in March 1968 keyboardist Rodgers died. Thompson and Taylor left and, after several more line-up shuffles in an attempt to preserve the band, the Rovin' Flames disbanded in 1969.

== Discography ==
=== Singles ===
- "Gloria"/"J.J.J.P." (Fuller/CFP-2627) 1965
- "I'm Afraid to Go Home"/"I Can't" ( Boss/BOS-002) 1966
- "Bo Diddley"/"Seven Million People" (Tampa Bay/BC-1111) 1966
- "How Many Times"/"Love Song No. 6" (Decca/32191) 1967
