= The Plagues =

American garage rock band

Background information
- Origin: Lansing, Michigan, United States
- Genres: Garage rock
- Years active: 1964-1966
- Labels: Quarantined; Fenton; This is Music
- Past members: Bill Malone; Jim Hosley; Van Decker; Phil Nobach; Scott Durbin

The Plagues were an American garage rock band from Lansing, Michigan who were active in the 1960s (not to be confused with other bands of the period named "the Plagues"). They were led by bass player, principal songwriter, and vocalist William Malone. The group had a local and regional hit with "I've Been Through It Before". Malone left the band in 1966 to join the Frightened Trees, as the remaining members formed a new group out of the ashes of the Plagues, the Plain Brown Wrapper. Malone later became a successful Hollywood movie director, whose 2008 horror thriller Parasomnia included "I've Been Through It Before", as well as other songs by the Plagues and other 1960s garage bands. In the intervening years the Plagues work has attracted a following amongst garage rock enthusiasts and collectors.

== History ==
The Plagues were founded in 1964 in Lansing, Michigan. Their primary vocalist and songwriter was William Malone. Their original lineup consisted of Malone on lead vocals and bass, Van Decker on lead guitar, James Hosley on rhythm guitar, and Phil Nobach on drums. The group's first single was released in 1965 on the Quarantined label, which was a vanity label of Fenton Records and it featured "That'll Never Do" b/w "Badlands". Its follow-up, also on Quarantined, was "Through this World" b/w "Why Can't You Be True". "Through This World" charted locally on WILS, then a popular AM pop station in Lansing. The group's final release was "I've Been Through It Before" b/w "Tears From My Eyes", which appeared in July 1966. The flipside, "Tears From My Eyes", was a ballad and reflected the band's Beatles influence. According to Malone:

We were basically a Beatles band to start with. We did all Beatles tunes. Then we started branching out. We also liked the Byrds and the Animals. It wasn't long after our first show at Everett High School that we played Waverly Junior High School — we nearly started a riot. It was like something out of 'Hard Day's Night.' We had a big local following; there were about 300 kids in our fan club.

The Plagues opened for the Young Rascals when they came to Lansing. In 1966, Malone left the group and went on to front another Lansing-based garage band, the Frightened Trees, who recorded the "Round and Round" single, which included "I'll Be Back", a Beatles cover, on the flipside. In the fall of 1966, after Malone's departure, Decker, Nobach, and Hosley formed a new band out of the remnants of the Plagues that, with the addition of Scott Durbin and Steve Allen, became the Plain Brown Wrapper. That group played large shows in Detroit, sharing the bill with MC5 and Bob Seger. They recorded the single, "You'll Pay", in November 1966 and would subsequently undergo a series of lineup changes until their breakup in 1974. By the end of the 1960s, the teen scene in Lansing faded as more sophisticated sounds emerged. With the intention of joining the film industry (long a dream of his), William Malone moved to California and got a job at Don Post Studios. He eventually became a successful film director of horror thrillers, such as House on Haunted Hill, Scared to Death, Creature and FeardotCom. His 2008 horror film Parasomnia included the Plagues "I've Been Through It Before" in its soundtrack, as well as other songs by them and other 1960s garage bands.

The Plagues work has attracted a following amongst garage rock enthusiasts and collectors. Several of the Plagues songs such as "Through This World" and "I've Been Through It Before" and are featured on the compilation Scream Loud!!! The Fenton Story put out by Way Back Records. "I've Been Through It Before" also appears on Teenage Shutdown! You Treated Me Bad!.

== Membership (circa 1966–1967) ==
- Bill Malone (lead vocals and bass)
- Jim Hosley (guitar, vocals)
- Van Decker (lead guitar, piano, organ, vocals)
- Phil Nobach (drums)
- Scott Durbin (Trumpet)

== Discography ==
- "That'll Never Do" b/w "Badlands" (Quarantined 41369, 1965)
- "Why Can't You Be True" b/w "Through this World" (Quarantined 2020, February 1966)
- "I've Been through it Before" b/w "(Clouds Send Down) Tears From My Eyes" (Fenton 2070, July 1966)
- "You'll Pay" b/w "And Now You Dream" (as the Plain Brown Wrapper) (This is Music 2114, November 1966)
