= Fenton Records =

- Founded: 1960s
- Founder: Dave Kalmbach
- Genre: Garage rock
- Country of origin: U.S.
- Location: Sparta, Michigan
- Official website: www.rimpo.de/fenton.htm

Fenton Records was an independent record label founded by Dave Kalmbach in the early 1960s. The label was based in Sparta, Michigan, though is often regarded as a Grand Rapids, Michigan garage rock label.

It is known for releasing albums by Michigan garage bands such as the Quests, the Plagues, the Barons, the Aardvarks, the Assortment, the Chancellors, the Ones, Tonto and the Renegades, and the Jades. Over a six-year span, the label released at least 100 45 rpm records and a handful of LPs.

== The record label ==
The Fenton Records label was started in the village of Sparta (near Grand Rapids) in the early 1960s by Dave Kalmbach, with help from business partner Bruce Smith.

Many bands that recorded with the label were from Grand Rapids, however bands from other Michigan cities like Lansing, Cedar Springs, Greenville, Bay City, and Grand Ledge would travel to Sparta to record at the studio.

The label and studio (Great Lakes Recording Studio) was operated out of a movie theater and was one of only three studios in the Grand Rapids area. The company was a "pay as you go" label, meaning the label offered bands recording, mastering services and vinyl pressing for a fee.

The vinyl was originally produced out of state, though later Fenton vinyl was pressed at American Record Pressing in Owosso, Michigan, which also made records for Motown.

== Fenton subsidiaries ==
Fenton Records was what is known as a "vanity" label, meaning bands paid for recording time and some vinyl records. Rumor has it that if Kalmbach thought the song lacked quality, he wouldn't release it on Fenton, instead it would be tagged with a sub-label, such as 4 Count or Buyit Records. Other times band members would be allowed to pick (or create) which label-name they wanted to be under, such as Sound of the Sceen and Vark.

== See also ==
- Fenton Records discography
