= Sparta, Michigan =

- Village
- Village of Sparta
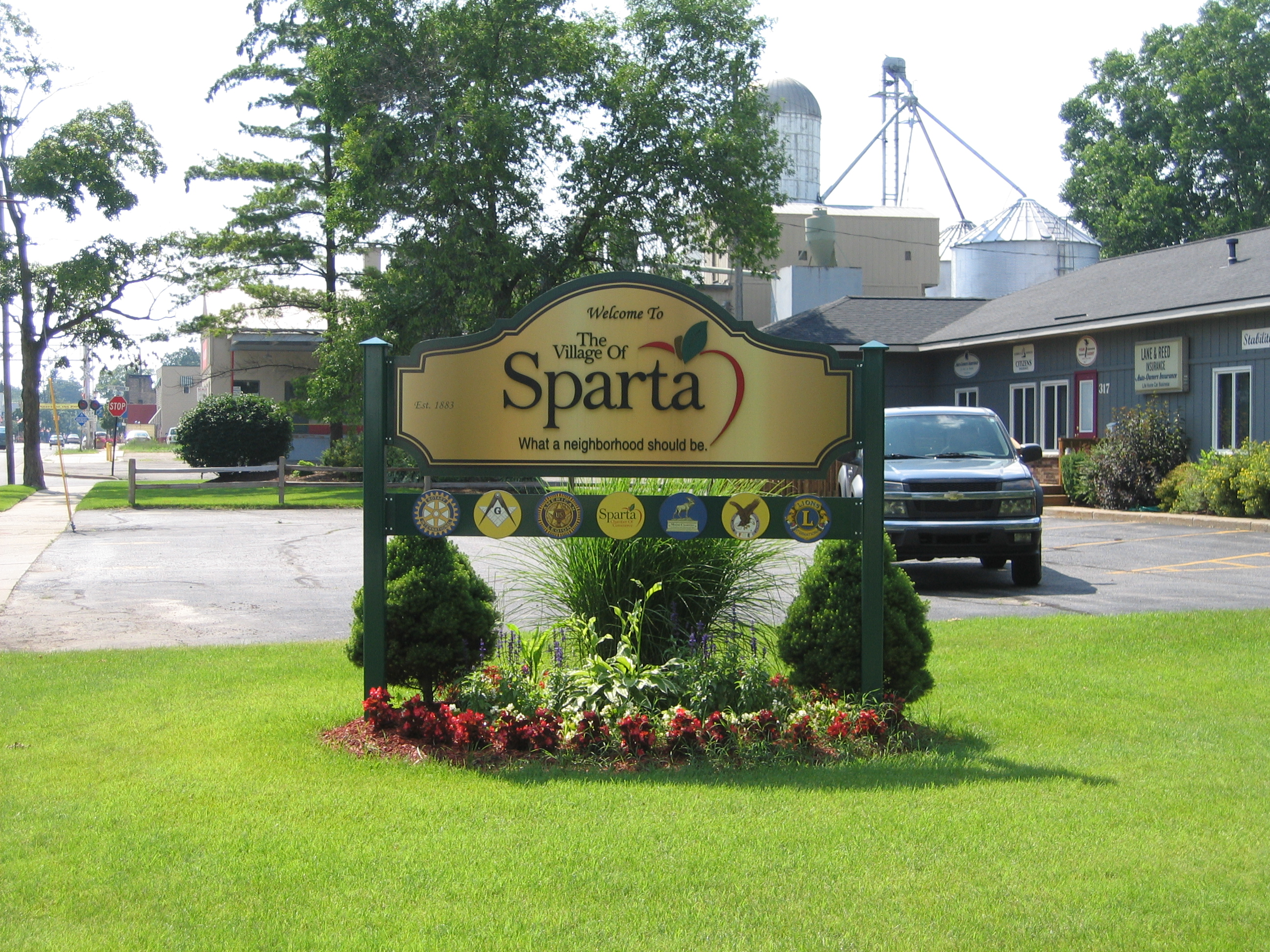
- Village of Sparta welcome sign

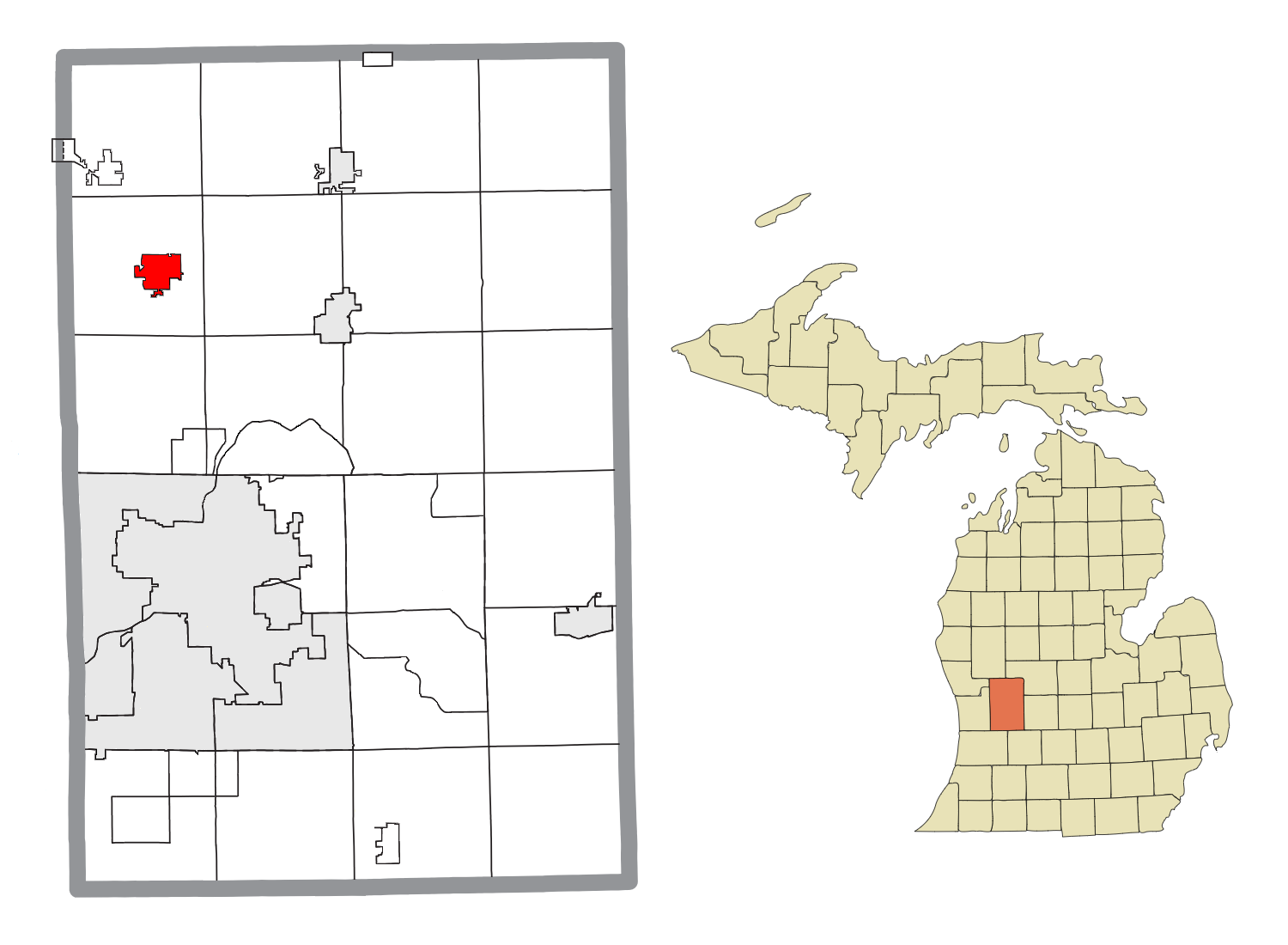
- Location within Kent County

- Location within the state of Michigan Location within the United States
- Coordinates: 43°09′27″N 85°42′32″W
- Country: United States
- State: Michigan
- County: Kent
- Settled: 1844
- Platted: 1867
- Incorporated: 1883

Government
  - Type: Village council
  - President: Robert Whalen
  - Clerk: Katy Shelton

Area
  - Total: 2.56 sq mi (6.63 km^{2})
  - Land: 2.55 sq mi (6.60 km^{2})
  - Water: 0.012 sq mi (0.03 km^{2})
- Elevation: 797 ft (243 m)

Population (2020)
  - Total: 4,244
  - Density: 1,663.2/sq mi (642.17/km^{2})
- Time zone: UTC-5 (EST)
  - Summer (DST): UTC-4 (EDT)
- ZIP code: 49345
- Area code: 616
- FIPS code: 26-75420
- GNIS feature ID: 0638470
- Website: Official website

Sparta, officially the Village of Sparta, is a village in Kent County in the U.S. state of Michigan. The population was 4,244 at the 2020 census. The village is located within Sparta Township.

Sparta is part of the Grand Rapids metropolitan area and is located about 10 miles (16 km) north of the city of Grand Rapids.

== History ==
The Sparta area was first settled in 1844, with the township formally organized in 1846. The first settler in what is now the village was Jonathan Nash in 1846. Calling the place Nashville, he built a sawmill on Lick Creek. Subsequently, he changed the name of the creek to Nash Creek. Seeing as there was already a Nashville in Michigan, the state legislature suggested Sparta. The village was platted in 1867 and incorporated in 1883.

During World War II, Sparta was host to a German prisoner of war camp. The POWs were put to work as farmhands because many of the farmhands from the town had left to go fight in the war. The prisoners were treated relatively well, and later even wrote letters to the owner of the farm they worked on saying such things as, "I like to think back on the nice time we could spend on your farm."

=== Music ===
In the early to late 1960s, Sparta was home to Fenton Records, an independent record company and recording studio. The label recorded many local bands, as well as other Michigan garage bands. Due to the limited runs of the records, Fenton vinyl 45rpms are highly collectable, often selling for hundreds of dollars each. Many of the records were compiled on a CD called Scream Loud!!!: The Fenton Records Story (Way Back Records).

== Geography ==
According to the U.S. Census Bureau, the village has a total area of 2.56 square miles (6.63 km^{2}), of which 2.55 square miles (6.60 km^{2}) is land and 0.01 square miles (0.03 km^{2}) (0.40%) is water.

The Rogue River flows through the eastern portion of the village.

=== Major highways ===
- M-37 runs north–south through the westernmost portion of the village.

== Demographics ==
Historical population
Census	Pop.	Note	%±
1880	507		—
1890	904		78.3%
1900	1,126		24.6%
1910	1,203		6.8%
1920	1,502		24.9%
1930	1,939		29.1%
1940	1,945		0.3%
1950	2,327		19.6%
1960	2,749		18.1%
1970	3,094		12.6%
1980	3,373		9.0%
1990	3,968		17.6%
2000	4,159		4.8%
2010	4,140		−0.5%
2020	4,244		2.5%
U.S. Decennial Census

=== 2020 census ===
As of the 2020 census, Sparta had a population of 4,244. The median age was 36.3 years. 22.8% of residents were under the age of 18 and 16.6% of residents were 65 years of age or older. For every 100 females there were 89.0 males, and for every 100 females age 18 and over there were 87.3 males age 18 and over.

97.8% of residents lived in urban areas, while 2.2% lived in rural areas.

There were 1,742 households in Sparta, of which 30.3% had children under the age of 18 living in them. Of all households, 40.3% were married-couple households, 18.5% were households with a male householder and no spouse or partner present, and 32.4% were households with a female householder and no spouse or partner present. About 30.0% of all households were made up of individuals and 14.5% had someone living alone who was 65 years of age or older.

There were 1,819 housing units, of which 4.2% were vacant. The homeowner vacancy rate was 1.8% and the rental vacancy rate was 2.6%.

Racial composition as of the 2020 census
Race	Number	Percent
White	3,785	89.2%
Black or African American	37	0.9%
American Indian and Alaska Native	23	0.5%
Asian	11	0.3%
Native Hawaiian and Other Pacific Islander	0	0.0%
Some other race	76	1.8%
Two or more races	312	7.4%
Hispanic or Latino (of any race)	285	6.7%

=== 2010 census ===
As of the census of 2010, there were 4,140 people, 1,644 households, and 1,059 families living in the village. The population density was 1,682.9 inhabitants per square mile (649.8/km^{2}). There were 1,782 housing units at an average density of 724.4 per square mile (279.7/km^{2}). The racial makeup of the village was 94.5% White, 1.3% African American, 0.4% Native American, 0.5% Asian, 1.6% from other races, and 1.7% from two or more races. Hispanic or Latino of any race were 4.2% of the population.

There were 1,644 households, of which 37.3% had children under the age of 18 living with them, 42.9% were married couples living together, 16.1% had a female householder with no husband present, 5.5% had a male householder with no wife present, and 35.6% were non-families. 30.4% of all households were made up of individuals, and 15.2% had someone living alone who was 65 years of age or older. The average household size was 2.51 and the average family size was 3.12.

The median age in the village was 34 years. 28.5% of residents were under the age of 18; 8.8% were between the ages of 18 and 24; 27.3% were from 25 to 44; 21.7% were from 45 to 64; and 13.8% were 65 years of age or older. The gender makeup of the village was 47.1% male and 52.9% female.

=== 2000 census ===
As of the census of 2000, there were 4,159 people, 1,618 households, and 1,093 families living in the village. The population density was 1,703.9 inhabitants per square mile (657.9/km^{2}). There were 1,704 housing units at an average density of 698.1 per square mile (269.5/km^{2}). The racial makeup of the village was 95.70% White, 0.63% African American, 0.17% Native American, 0.41% Asian, 1.88% from other races, and 1.23% from two or more races. Hispanic or Latino of any race were 3.58% of the population.

There were 1,618 households, out of which 38.4% had children under the age of 18 living with them, 49.8% were married couples living together, 13.4% had a female householder with no husband present, and 32.4% were non-families. 27.8% of all households were made up of individuals, and 13.0% had someone living alone who was 65 years of age or older. The average household size was 2.54 and the average family size was 3.11.

In the village, the population was spread out, with 29.7% under the age of 18, 9.4% from 18 to 24, 31.2% from 25 to 44, 16.7% from 45 to 64, and 13.0% who were 65 years of age or older. The median age was 32 years. For every 100 females, there were 87.3 males. For every 100 females age 18 and over, there were 81.6 males.

The median income for a household in the village was $39,047, and the median income for a family was $45,822. Males had a median income of $35,000 versus $26,121 for females. The per capita income for the village was $17,920. About 4.9% of families and 7.2% of the population were below the poverty line, including 9.1% of those under age 18 and 4.6% of those age 65 or over.

== Notable people ==
- Amherst B. Cheney, member of the Michigan House of Representatives (1877–1880), 1888 Prohibition nominee for governor
- Ahmed Fareed, television media personality for NBCSN
- Vivian Martin, stage and silent film actress
- Cody Stamann, professional UFC fighter
