= The Quests (American band) =

American garage rock band

- Above from left to right: Jim Nixon, Neil Turmell, Bob Dengate, Joe Suchocki, Bob Fritzen, and Lyle Hotchkiss.

Background information
- Origin: Grand Rapids, Michigan, United States
- Genres: Garage rock
- Years active: 1964-1968
- Label: Fenton
- Past members: Bob Fritzen; Ron Sieracki; Joe Suchocki; Bob Dengate; Jim Nixon; Jerry Szyszko; Neil Turmell; Lyle Hotchkiss

The Quests were an American garage rock band formed in Grand Rapids, Michigan, in 1964. Recording for Fenton Records between 1966 and 1967, the group released three singles in their career. Although the group was hampered by a lyrical controversy surrounding one of their tunes, they achieved regional popularity among their teen fanbase with the original songs "Scream Loud" and "Shadows in the Night". Since the Quests' disbandment, their material has been well-documented on garage rock compilation albums and prompted surviving members to occasionally reunite.

== History ==
Formed in 1964, and motivated by earning a hit record in Michigan, the Quests were composed of Grand Rapids Junior College students Bob Fritzen (lead vocals, rhythm guitar), Joe Suchocki (rhythm guitar), Bob Dengate (bass guitar, vocals), Jim Nixon (keyboards) and Jerry Szyszko (drums). After practice sessions on the college grounds, the band made its debut live performance to a sold-out crowd at a local teen dance club known as the Pit. Fritzen recalled the Quests "were primarily seen as a group that could perform a wide variety of the recent sounds of that time, both instrumentally and vocally". He also credits the Beatles and the Beach Boys for the band's vocal harmonies. Shortly after the band's first few gigs at the Pit, Szyszko gave up on drumming and sold his kit to Neil Turmell, who replaced him at the position.

In 1965, the Quests recorded demo tapes for Fenton Records, which consisted of three original compositions penned by Fritzen: "Secret Love", "Look Up to Me", and "Scream Loud". While the band was satisfied with their take of "Scream Loud", they were less impressed with the other two songs, and sought a way to bolster their sound. They recruited Lyle Hotchkiss, the former guitarist of the surf rock instrumental group known as the Stingrays. Almost immediately after the acquisition, the Quests entered Great Lakes Recording Studio in Sparta, Michigan, where record producer Dave Kalmbach recorded the group's debut single. The record featured Fritzen's "Scream Loud", coupled with "Psychic", an Instrumental written by Hotchkiss during his stint with the Stingrays. Upon its release in March 1966, "Scream Loud" received substantial support from Michigan-based deejays, and peaked at number two on the regional charts.

Hopes were high on the band's sophomore effort as they recorded the Fritzen original "Shadows in the Night", and Hotchkiss's "I'm Tempted". Marked by its up-tempo fuzz-toned guitar melody, and Fritzen's vocal range, "Shadows in the Night" appeared to possess the potential to exceed the popularity of the Quests' debut. However, the single's B-side, "I'm Tempted", was protested by parents who were concerned with the song's alleged sexual content. The tune, along with "Shadows in the Night", was barred from further radio play within a month after its initial pressing. Nonetheless, the Quests became immensely popular among teen audiences as they performed at campuses, teen dance clubs, and at the larger venue Grand Haven Roller Rink, which seated as many as 6,000 attendees. Although the group traditionally was billed as a solo act, the Quests were Freddy Cannon's backing band as he toured Michigan, which subsequently lead to the band opening for the Supremes and Neil Diamond.

For their third and final single, the band chose the Fritzen-penned "What Can I Do". Since it was prematurely pulled from radio stations, the song, "Shadows of Night", was reissued as the flip-side. Yet, despite charting at number 24 regionally, the Quests ran into more setbacks as they attempted to persuade nationally-distributing record labels. As Fritzen recalled, "Right when we were considering how many 45s to reorder, we received a call from Dick McKay, WLAV top DJ and station manager, who told us that a Detroit record producer passing through Grand Rapids heard the song ['What Can I Do'] on the radio and called the station to get information. He told McKay to tell us that he'd be interested in promoting the song on a large scale, but only if we immediately pulled it from the Grand Rapids airways. So, we decided not to order more records, the song quickly dropped off the charts, and, sadly, we never heard from the record producer again".

In 1968, the Quests disbanded after its members graduated from college, and pursued other opportunities. Despite receiving little airplay, "Shadows in the Night" has since become one of the group's most beloved compositions, and appears—as does several other tunes—on compilation albums. Among them include The Chosen Few, Volume 1, Highs in the Mid-Sixties, Volume 5, Michigan Mayhem, Volume 1, Trash Box, and Scream Loud!!! The Fenton Story. Sporadically, the Quests have reunited, most notably in 2007 when surviving members recorded the album ReQUESTed: Back to the Garage. Along with five new recordings, the album features four previously unreleased songs from the band's recording sessions between 1966 and 1967.

== Discography ==
=== Singles ===
- "Scream Loud" b/w "Psychic" - Fenton #2032, 1966
- "Shadows in the Night" b/w "I'm Tempted" - Fenton #2086, 1966
- "What Can I Do" b/w "Shadows in the Night" - Fenton #2174, 1966
- "Shadows in the Night" b/w "I'm Tempted" - Hyperloop Records #HL7 2019

=== Album ===
- ReQUESTed: Back to the Garage - private pressing, 2007
