= Veil (album) =

Studio album by Band of Susans
- Released: July 1, 1993
- Recorded: January–February 1993
- Studio: Baby Monster Studio, New York City
- Genre: Noise rock; shoegazing; alternative rock
- Length: 56:24
- Label: Restless; Rough Trade
- Producer: Robert Poss

Band of Susans chronology
| Now (1992) | Veil (1993) | Wired for Sound (1995) |

Veil is the fourth studio album by American noise rock band Band of Susans. After establishing their "classic-line up" with their previous album The Word and the Flesh (1991), and recording the EP Now (1992), the band aimed for a new, more sonic and experimental direction on Veil, after the more song-centric approach to The Word and the Flesh. Recording the album in early 1993, Veil shows the band expand the margins of their sound with a more experimental approach. The album was described as "smokey" by one critic and an "epic swell of guitar and noise" by another. The album has been said to combine "R&B rhythms with crushed sonic shards," and has been compared to, and is sometimes considered to be shoegazing music.

The album was released in July 1993 by Restless Records in the United States and by Rough Trade Records in Germany. It was a critical success, with critics complimenting its sonic and textural sound. Melody Maker said "this is the kind of record that puts everything else into perspective" and that "this is rock at its most liberated and free-flowing," whilst Creem described the band and their sound unequalled. The band built upon the experimental sound of the album for their following, final album, Here Comes Success (1995).

== Background and recording ==
After forming in 1986, Band of Susans went through numerous line-up changes to accompany the band's core members, band leader and guitarist Robert Poss, bassist Susan Stenger and drummer Ron Spitzer. After releasing two albums, Hope Against Hope (1988) and Love Agenda (1989), the band settled into their "classic line up" in 1990, featuring the two guitarists Anne Husick and Mark Lonergan in addition to the core members. That year, they recorded The Word and the Flesh, not released until 1991, which saw a more melodic and less noise-concerned sound than their prior albums.

In 1992, the band released the Now EP, which, among its six tracks, included two songs which would subsequently appear on Veil: "Pearl of Wisdom" and "Following My Heart". The two songs were recorded and mixed at Baby Monster Studios, New York City, in July and August 1992. The band recorded the rest of Veil in the same studio in January and February 1993. As with the band's previous albums, Poss produced the album alone, whilst Bryce Goggin engineered the album.

== Music ==
=== Style ===
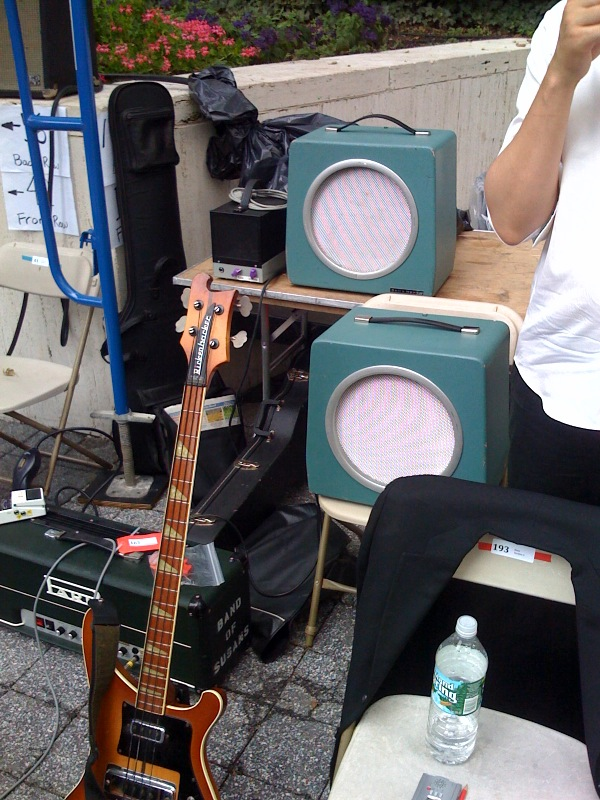
Instruments belonging to Robert Poss (pictured in 2008).

Veil sees a change in direction for the band, showing the band "expand the margins of their sound" with a "far more experimental" approach than the band's previous albums. Michael Petitti of Tucson Weekly said the band went in a "sonically more ambitious" direction on Veil, and described the album as "smoky" and "terse," whilst Punk Auction said the album was "dense" and "droning". According to Julie Taraska, writing in The Rough Guide to Rock, Veil "supplanted R&B rhythms with crunched sonic shards," whilst Trouser Press describe the album as containing "wavering density and stylistic peregrinations." They said the album has a lesser focus on songwriting than previous albums and that its sound is close to shoegazing at times. According to Robert Palmer of Rolling Stone, Veil sees the band "deliver the songs as well as the sound. Tunes like "Mood Swing", "Not in This Life", "Trouble Spot" and the sublime "Blind" unfurl sharp, both melodies over stick-in-your-head ensemble riffs. Ron Spitzker's drums spit and snap, and Stenger's basslines provide melodic as well as rhythmic backbone. Guitarists Poss, Anne Husick and Mark Lonergan are also developing a noisier, nastier, but still coherently thematic brand of collective improvisation, showcased in the instrumental rave "Trollbinders Theme". Mayhem and transcendence, sweetness and bite: The thought of what these people might accomplish with a more substantial recording budget is almost frightening.

According to Greg Kot of The Chicago Tribune, Veil sees the band "perfect one of the more distinctive vocabularies in the guitar-band pantheon. Instead of taking on traditional lead and rhythm roles, the three guitarists create a matrix of riffs that interlock and fly apart. Susan Stenger's bass frequently states the melody, while Ron Spitzer's drums knock out precision patterns that mesh with the guitars. There's an intellectual rigor that underpins the music, but it doesn't stifle the passion. Instead, the overdriven guitars strike with a jewel-like precision and clarity that elude most distortion-heavy bands." Chris Parker of Allmusic called the album their "most assured to date," saying it shows the band "expanding the margins of their sound. " He commented that whereas The Word and the Flesh was focused on songcraft, on Veil "the compositions reign. The band is no longer content to let the guitars drone with feral ferocity, instead exploring greater use of dynamics, dissonance, and interplay. Far more experimental in approach than their previous albums, the rewards are revealed with repeated listening as the complexity of the songs' interior structures becomes more transparent."

When Onda Rock retrospectively commented that Veil records "all sorts of contamination to the point that the distortion seeks to camouflage, distorting, the typical features of rock music," Poss said that the band "tried not to repeat twice the same album" and said that he thinks Veil "show how the Poss-Stenger torque is gained," commenting "I thought that we could delve a little 'more in rock music ("Pearls of Wisdom", for one thing,) while continuing to develop new hybrid music trans-genre. I think you and Susan were mostly interested in extending the vocabulary of that much of the band. The curious thing is that our interest in composers such as Phill Niblock, Alvin Lucier, John Cage and Christian Wolff was banished from our contemporaries of the late 80s; It would become fashionable only years later."

=== Songs ===
Opening track "Mood Swing" begins with "a lean-to of stereo call and return guitar lines before the throbbing bass and drums come in with the foundation and the song swells, becoming a storm with flashes of guitar audible within the squall." Petitti said that "whereas The Word and the Flesh opened with a roar of guitars, Veil began with a cascade of ricocheting guitars." At the song's break, the guitars drop out, and after several measures of "choppy rhythm," the "storm returns," and according to Parker, "this intermingling of intermittent sounds and effects is made even more effective by expanding the palette beyond a melodic crush of guitar to include individual dissonant and minor chords that bring all three guitars into bas-relief. The lyrics are often lost, like a lone figure in a field beneath a thundering, searing cloud of sound, with only the refrain echoing softly."

"Not in This Life", "Trouble Spot", the "sublime" "Blind" and the aforementioned "Mood Swing" all "unfurl sharp, both melodies over stick-in-your-head ensemble riffs." "Trollbinders Theme" is an "instrumental rave" that shows the trio of guitarists' developing "noisier, nastier, but still coherently thematic brand of collective improvisation." "Pearls of Wisdom" was the band's attempt to "delve a little more in rock music." The same song and "Following My Heart" originally appeared on the band's 1992 EP Now. The final track on the album, a remix of "The Red and the Black", is a hidden track not listed on copies of the album.

== Release ==
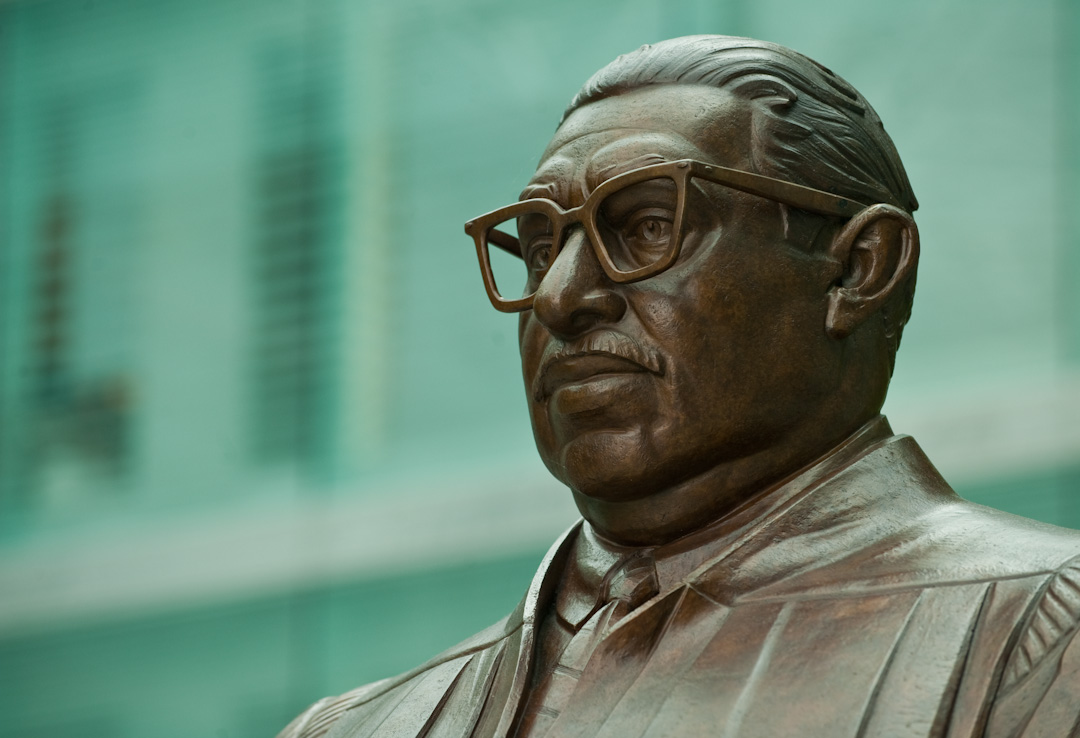
The album was dedicated to Thurgood Marshall who died during recording.

The album was released on CD and cassette in July 1993 by Restless Records in the United States and by Rough Trade Records as a CD in Germany. The album was dedicated to the first African-American Associate Justice of the Supreme Court of the United States, Thurgood Marshall, who had died during recording, and English businessman and founder of Marshall Amplification, Jim Marshall. In 2013, Collin Daniels ranked the album cover at number 36 on his list of "My 50 Favourite Rock Album Covers," saying that "this cover – to me – perfectly matches the sound that you hear on the record."

As with the band's other releases, it was not a commercial success. According to Martin Charles, writing in The Great Indie Discography, "unfortunately, success is the one thing that has eluded the Band of Susans and Co. throughout their decade-plus lifespan." One single was released to promote the album, "Mood Swing" in 1993, backed with the previously unreleased B-side "The Last Temptation of Susan". It was only released as a limited edition seven-inch single by Sing Fat Records in the United States, with some copies being purple and some copies being yellow. That same year, the same song appeared on the compilation Rough Trade: Music for the 90's – Volume 5, released in Germany. and on the British compilation The Lost Weekend, released free by Blast First to "survivors" of the "Lost Weekend" shows at the Astoria 2 in London on September 10 and 11, 1993, where the band had played.

== Critical reception ==
Professional ratings
Review scores
| Source | Rating |
|---|---|
| Allmusic | 4.5/5 stars |
| Alternative Press | (favourable) |
| Melody Maker | (favourable) |
| NME | (favourable) |
| Rolling Stone | 4/5 stars |
| The Wire | (favourable) |

The album was released to a positive critical reception. Robert Palmer of Rolling Stone rated the album four stars out of five, saying that the band "deliver the songs as well as the sound. Tunes like "Mood Swing", "Not in This Life", "Trouble Spot" and the sublime "Blind" unfurl sharp, both melodies over stick-in-your-head ensemble riffs," and said that "mayhem and transcendence, sweetness and bite: The thought of what these people might accomplish with a more substantial recording budget is almost frightening. He concluded, "all hail the overdriven amp, the feedback-saturated guitar pickup, the hum of harmonic sustain, the clamorous collision of power chords in the heart of the sonic maelstrom. Let us now praise Band of Susans." Greg Kot of The Chicago Tribune called the album the band's "best record" and said that they "have perfected one of the more distinctive vocabularies in the guitar-band pantheon. Instead of taking on traditional lead and rhythm roles, the three guitarists create a matrix of riffs that interlock and fly apart. Susan Stenger's bass frequently states the melody, while Ron Spitzer's drums knock out precision patterns that mesh with the guitars." The magazine said that "Band Of Susans never loses sight of the passion that underscores the rigorous intellect of their music."

Melody Maker said "this is the kind of record that puts everything else into perspective. Compared to all the turgid, overstrained rock that's been clawing its way from America these past years, Veil soars like Lindbergh's plane. A sublime, breathtaking fluency. This is rock at its most liberated and free-flowing. Alternative Press said the album is "undeniably great, an epic swell of guitar and noise." Creem rhetorically asked "how to describe a band and a sound unequalled?" The NME were also very favourable, saying "it's about an enduring love of guitars that borders on potential deafness, about having the last passionate embrace of rock n roll s blistered sorry being. It's about leaving the cliches to rest." The Wire said the album was "a crucible of high art and trash rock culture."

The album has continued to be acclaimed in later times. Chris Parker of Allmusic rated the album four and a half stars out of five and said although not "perhaps not as immediately compelling as The Word and the Flesh, the band members are nonetheless at the top of their game, expanding the margins of their sound." He said that "the sheer muscular musical virtuosity of this album requires few words." Trouser Press were less favourable, saying the album "lacks the melodies and structural designs that would validate the medium-over-message approach," whilst Andrew Earles said the album "finds the quartet in too much of a reconnaissance mode."

== Aftermath ==
The band followed Veil with their fifth and final studio album, Here Comes Success in 1995, which is said to build upon their experiments on Veil. Trouser Press said the album "explains where Band of Susans was headed but didn't reach on Veil," whilst Earles, including Here Comes Success in his book of "500 Essential Underground Albums 1981–1996," said that the band had spent Veil "looking for what it would then perfect" on Here Comes Success. The band split up in 1996, with their final release being the "best of" compilation Wired for Sound, which features several tracks from Veil.

== Track listing ==
All songs written by Robert Poss and Susan Stenger

1. "Mood Swing" - 5:06
2. "Not in This Life" - 5:03
3. "The Red and the Black" - 5:01
4. "Following My Heart" - 4:28
5. "Stained Glass" - 6:02
6. "The Last Temptation of Susan" - 2:38
7. "Truce" - 3:59
8. "Trouble Spot" - 4:40
9. "Pearls of Wisdom" - 4:10
10. "Trollbinders Theme" - 4:24
11. "Blind" - 4:30
12. "The Red and the Black" (remix) - 6:23

== Personnel ==
- Robert Poss - guitar, vocals
- Susan Stenger - bass, vocals
- Mark Lonergan - guitar
- Anne Husick - guitar
- Ron Spitzer - drums
