= Wired for Sound (Band of Susans album) =

Compilation album by Band of Susans
- Released: January 23, 1995
- Recorded: August 1986–February 1993
- Genre: Noise rock, shoegazing, alternative rock
- Length: 129:53
- Label: Blast First

Band of Susans chronology
Veil (1993)	Wired for Sound (1995)	Here Comes Success (1995)

Professional ratings
Review scores
Source	Rating
AllMusic	4/5 stars

Wired for Sound is a compilation album by Band of Susans, released in 1995 by Blast First.

== Track listing ==
All tracks are written by Robert Poss and Susan Stenger.

Disc one
No.	Title	Album (recording date)	Length
1.	"Hope Against Hope"	Blessing and Curse (1986)	5:00
2.	"Throne of Blood"	Hope Against Hope (1987)	3:16
3.	"You Were an Optimist"	Blessing and Curse (1986)	3:18
4.	"All the Wrong Reasons"	Hope Against Hope (1987)	5:26
5.	"The Pursuit of Happiness"	Love Agenda (1988)	5:29
6.	"Hard Light"	Love Agenda (1988)	4:41
7.	"It's Locked Away"	Love Agenda (1988)	5:10
8.	"Birthmark"	Love Agenda (1988)	4:09
9.	"Now Is Now"	The Word and the Flesh (1990)	4:51
10.	"Trouble Follows" (1994 remix)	The Word and the Flesh (1990)	3:53
11.	"Ice Age" (1994 remix)	The Word and the Flesh (1990)	5:27
12.	"Following My Heart"	Now (1992)	4:31
13.	"Mood Swing"	Veil (1993)	5:07
14.	"The Red and the Black"	Veil (1993)	6:27
15.	"Blind"	Veil (1993)	3:55

Disc two
No.	Title	Album (recording date)	Length
1.	"Elliot Abrams in Hell"	Hope Against Hope (1987)	2:23
2.	"Where Have All the Flowers Gone"	Blessing and Curse (1986)	5:03
3.	"No God"	Hope Against Hope (1987)	5:00
4.	"Thorn in My Side"	Love Agenda (1988)	2:54
5.	"Sin Embargo"	Love Agenda (1988)	3:43
6.	"Bitter and Twisted"	The Word and the Flesh (1990)	3:13
7.	"Tilt"	The Word and the Flesh (1990)	5:06
8.	"Paint It Black"	Now (1992)	4:33
9.	"Trash Train"	Now (1992)	3:57
10.	"Out of the Question"		2:55
11.	"Trollbinders Theme"	Veil (1993)	4:25
12.	"The Last Temptation of Susan"	Veil (1993)	2:42
13.	"Guitar Trio"	The Word and the Flesh (1990)	13:21

== Personnel ==
Adapted from Wired for Sound liner notes.

Band of Susans

- Anne Husick – electric guitar
- Mark Lonergan – electric guitar
- Robert Poss – electric guitar, vocals
- Ron Spitzer – drums
- Susan Stenger – bass guitar, vocals

== Release history ==
Region	Date	Label	Format	Catalog
United Kingdom	1995	Blast First	CD, LP	BFFP111
