= Page Hamilton discography =

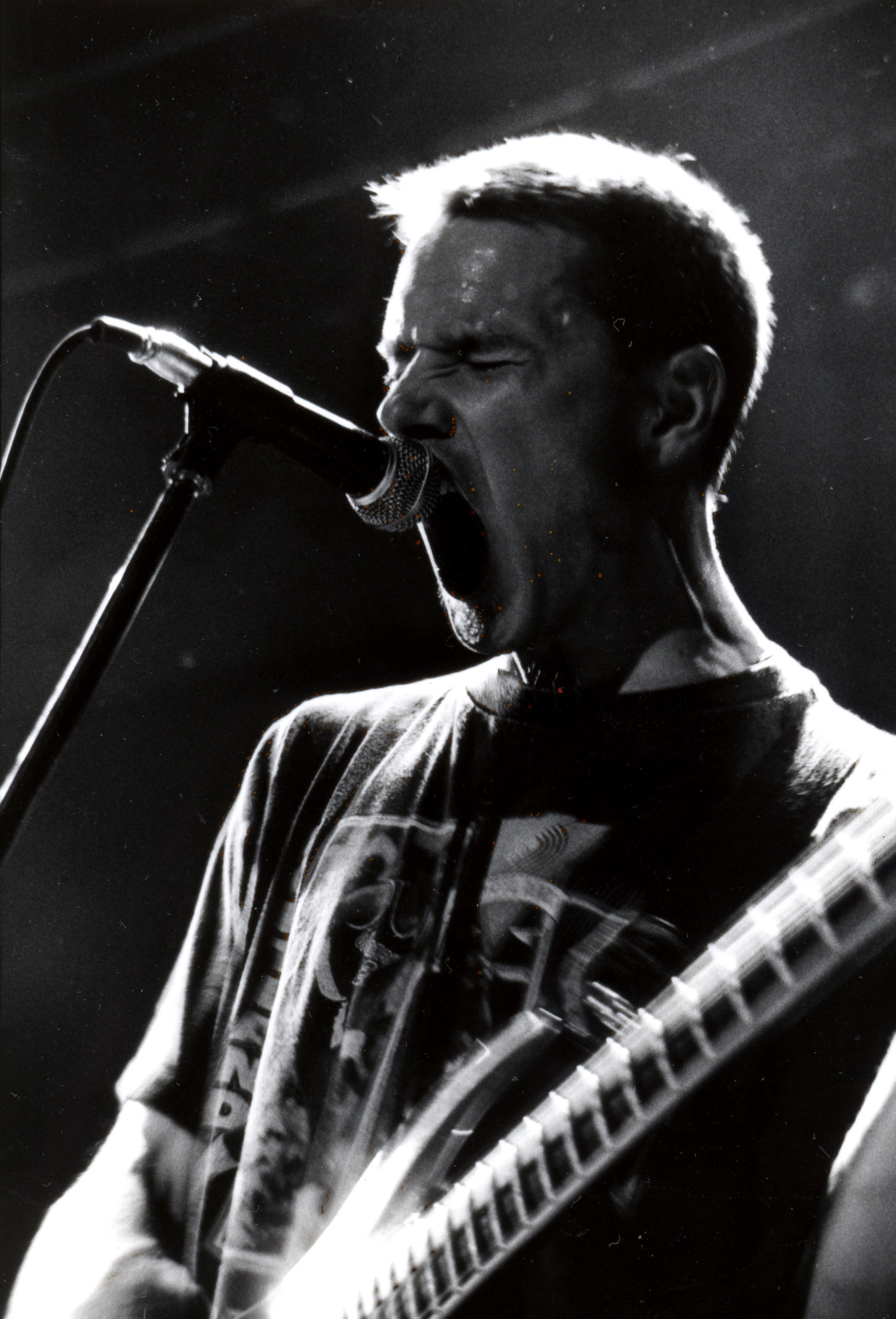
- Studio albums: 10
- EPs: 1
- Compilation albums: 3
- Singles: 16
- Music videos: 15

Page Hamilton is an American musician, best recognized as the frontman for the alternative metal band Helmet.

== Solo albums ==
=== Studio albums ===
Title	Album details
Zulutime (with Caspar Brötzmann)	Released: November 1996; Label: Atavistic; Format: CD

== Band of Susans ==
=== Studio albums ===
Title	Album details	UK Indie
Love Agenda	Released: April 17, 1989; Label: Blast First/Restless; Format: CD, CS, LP	6

=== Compilation albums ===
Title	Album details
Wired for Sound	Released: January 23, 1995; Label: Blast First; Format: CD

=== Extended plays ===
Title	Album details
The Peel Sessions	Released: 1992; Label: Dutch East India Trading; Format: CD

=== Singles ===
Year	Title	Album
1989	"Hard Light"	Love Agenda

== Helmet ==
=== Studio albums ===
Title	Album details	Peak chart positions										Certifications
Title	Album details	US	AUS	AUT	CHE	FIN	GER	NLD	NZL	SWE	UK	Certifications
Strap It On	Released: 1990; Label: Amphetamine Reptile; Format: CD, CS, LP	—	—	—	—	—	—	—	—	—	—	
Meantime	Released: June 23, 1992; Label: Interscope; Format: CD, CS, LP	68	88	—	—	—	—	—	—	—	—	US: Gold
Betty	Released: June 21, 1994; Label: Interscope; Format: CD, CS, LP, DI	45	23	18	32	—	16	71	43	13	38	
Aftertaste	Released: March 18, 1997; Label: Interscope; Format: CD, CS, LP	47	20	—	22	30	52	—	45	—	139	
Size Matters	Released: September 14, 2004; Label: Interscope; Format: CD	121	—	—	—	—	97	—	—	—	—	
Monochrome	Released: July 18, 2006; Label: Warcon; Format: CD, LP	159	—	—	—	—	—	—	—	—	—	
Seeing Eye Dog	Released: September 7, 2010; Label: Work Song; Format: CD, LP, DI	—	—	—	—	—	—	—	—	—	—	
Dead to the World	Released: October 28, 2016; Label: earMUSIC; Format: CD, LP	—	85	—	—	—	—	—	—	—	—	
"—" denotes a release that did not chart.

=== Compilation albums ===
Title	Album details
Born Annoying	Released: 1995; Label: Amphetamine Reptile; Format: CD, CS, LP
The Instrumental Music of Helmet (1992–1997)	Released: 2003; Label: Warner Music Group (WCM); Format: CD
Unsung: The Best of Helmet (1991–1997)	Released: January 27, 2004; Label: Interscope; Format: CD

=== Singles ===
Year	Song	Peak chart positions				Album
Year	Song	US Alt.	US Main.	NZL	UK	Album
1990	"Repetition"	—	—	—	—	Strap It On
1991	"Unsung"	29	32	—	—	Meantime
1992	"In the Meantime"	—	—	—	—	Meantime
1992	"Give It"	—	—	—	—	Meantime
1993	"Just Another Victim" (with House of Pain)	—	—	28	—	Judgment Night soundtrack
1993	"Primitive/Born Annoying (1993)"	—	—	—	—	Born Annoying
1994	"Milquetoast"	—	39	—	—	Betty
1994	"Biscuits for Smut"	—	—	—	78	Betty
1994	"Wilma's Rainbow"	—	—	—	—	Betty
1997	"Exactly What You Wanted"	—	19	—	—	Aftertaste
1997	"Like I Care"	—	—	—	—	Aftertaste
2004	"See You Dead"	—	29	—	—	Size Matters
2004	"Unwound"	—	—	—	—	Size Matters
2005	"Smart"	—	—	—	—	Size Matters
2006	"Gone"	—	—	—	—	Monochrome
2006	"Monochrome"	—	—	—	—	Monochrome
2007	"Money Shot"	—	—	—	—	Monochrome
"—" denotes a release that did not chart.

== Performance credits ==
Year	Artist	Release	Song(s)
1989	Glenn Branca	Symphony No. 6 (Devil Choirs at the Gates of Heaven)	—
1994	Therapy?	Troublegum	"Unbeliever"
1996	Joe Henry	Trampoline	"Bob & Ray", "Ohio Air Show Plane Crash", "Let Me Have It All", "Medicine", "Parade"
1998	Ben Neill	Goldbug	"Shirt Waste", "Goldbug", "It's Only Money"
1999	Nine Inch Nails	The Fragile	"No, You Don't"
2008	Wire	Object 47	"All Fours"
2008	Norma Jean	The Anti Mother	"Opposite of Left and Wrong"
2008	P.O.D.	When Angels & Serpents Dance	"God Forbid"
2014	Linkin Park	The Hunting Party	"All for Nothing"
