= Wipers Box Set =

Box set by Wipers
- Released: 2001
- Recorded: 1979–1983
- Genre: Punk rock
- Label: Zeno Records
- Producer: Greg Sage

Wipers chronology
Power in One (1999)	Wipers Box Set (2001)	Out Takes (2010)

Professional ratings
Review scores
Source	Rating
AllMusic	4.5/5 stars

Wipers Box Set is a compilation box set, comprising remastered reissues of the first three albums by punk rock band Wipers: Is This Real?, Youth of America and Over the Edge. The collection includes 23 bonus tracks, including six previously unreleased songs, as well as liner notes by leader Greg Sage.

== Track listing ==
=== Disc 1: Is This Real? ===
1. "Return of the Rat" - 2:38
2. "Mystery" - 1:47
3. "Up Front" - 3:04
4. "Let's Go Away" - 1:48
5. "Is This Real?" - 2:39
6. "Tragedy" - 2:00
7. "D-7" - 4:04
8. "Potential Suicide" - 3:34
9. "Don't Know What I Am" - 2:56
10. "Window Shop for Love" - 2:59
11. "Wait a Minute" - 3:04
12. "Born with a Curse" (previously unreleased) - 1:48
13. "Rebel with a Cause" (Is This Real? outtake) - 2:11
14. "Misfit" (previously unreleased) - 1:35
15. "Mystery" (original 4-track version) - 1:46
16. "Tragedy" (original 4-track version) - 2:11
17. "Let's Go Away" (original 4-track version) - 1:52
18. "Is This Real?" (original 4-track version) - 2:40
19. "Alien Boy" - 3:23
20. "Image of Man" - 2:29
21. "Telepathic Love" - 1:32
22. "Voices in the Rain" - 1:24
- 1-11: Is This Real?
- 19-22: Alien Boy EP

=== Disc 2: Youth of America ===
1. "No Fair" - 4:25
2. "Youth of America" - 10:27
3. "Taking Too Long" - 3:07
4. "Can This Be" - 2:54
5. "Pushing the Extreme" - 3:13
6. "When It's Over" - 6:36
7. "Scared Stiff" (previously unreleased) - 2:52
8. "Pushing the Extreme" (alternate mix) - 3:11
9. "No Fair" (alternate mix) - 4:34
10. "When It's Over" (early version) - 6:26
11. "Youth of America" (alternate mix) - 10:27
- 1-6: Youth of America

=== Disc 3: Over the Edge ===
1. "Over the Edge" - 3:49
2. "Doom Town" - 3:56
3. "So Young" - 4:17
4. "Messenger" - 1:54
5. "Romeo" - 4:05
6. "Now Is the Time" - 3:02
7. "What Is" - 2:19
8. "No One Wants an Alien" - 3:23
9. "The Lonely One" - 3:38
10. "No Generation Gap" - 3:09
11. "This Time" - 2:54
12. "Mistaken ID" (live) - 3:05
13. "No Solution" ("Romeo" B-side) - 2:30
14. "Doom Town" (alternate mix) - 3:56
15. "The Lonely One" (alternate mix) - 3:37
16. "Now Is the Time" (alternate mix) - 3:04
17. "Romeo" (alternate vocal mix) - 4:05
18. "Our Past Life" (demo) - 1:29
- 1-11: Over the Edge
