= The Peel Sessions (Band of Susans EP) =

EP by Band of Susans
- Released: 1992
- Recorded: October 4, 1988 (tracks 1–4); July 2, 1989 (tracks 5 & 6)
- Genre: Noise rock Alternative rock
- Length: 27:12
- Label: Dutch East India Trading
- Producer: Robert Poss

Band of Susans chronology
The Word and the Flesh (1991)	The Peel Sessions (1992)	Now (1992)

Professional ratings
Review scores
Source	Rating
Allmusic	3/5 stars

The Peel Sessions is an EP by Band of Susans, recorded in 1988 and 1989 from sessions with John Peel but not released until 1992.

The first four tracks feature the same line-up as Love Agenda (with the latterly relatively famous Page Hamilton as one of the guitarists) but the latter two feature a line-up that never recorded any other material.

"Child of the Moon" (a Rolling Stones cover) and "Which Dream Came True" had been on Love Agenda whilst "Throne of Blood" and "Hope Against Hope" were on the debut. The remaining two tracks are covers of Wire's "Too Late" and Gang of Four's "I Found That Essence Rare" and were never on any Band of Susans album released on Blast First or Restless Records.

== Track listing ==
1. "I Found That Essence Rare" (Gang of Four) - 2:41
2. "Throne of Blood" (Robert Poss) - 4:09
3. "Child of the Moon" (Mick Jagger, Keith Richards) - 4:04
4. "Hope Against Hope" (Robert Poss) - 6:22
5. "Which Dream Came True" (Robert Poss) - 6:27
6. "Too Late" (Bruce Gilbert) - 3:29

== Personnel ==
Adapted from The Peel Session liner notes.

- Robert Poss - guitar, vocals
- Susan Stenger - bass
- Karen Haglof - guitar
- Page Hamilton - guitar (tracks: 1 to 4)
- Mark Lonergan - guitar (tracks: 5, 6)
- Ron Spitzer - drums

== Release history ==
Region	Date	Label	Format	Catalog
United States	1992	Strange Fruit	CD	DEI8353
