= Here Comes Success =

Album by Band of Susans

Studio album by Band of Susans
- Released: February 28, 1995
- Recorded: Autumn 1994
- Studio: Baby Monster Studio (New York City, New York)
- Genre: Noise rock, alternative rock
- Length: 64:12
- Label: Blast First/Restless
- Producer: Robert Poss

Band of Susans chronology
| Wired for Sound (1995) | Here Comes Success (1995) |

Professional ratings
Review scores
| Source | Rating |
|---|---|
| AllMusic | 4/5 stars |
| Rolling Stone | 3.5/5 stars |

Here Comes Success is the fifth and final studio album by American alternative rock band Band of Susans, released on February 28, 1995, by Blast First and Restless Records.

Andrew Earles included the album in his book Gimme Indie Rock: 500 Essential Underground Rock Albums 1981–1996 alongside The Word and the Flesh.

A review posted in the Tucson Weekly noted that the "elements that make Band of Susans truly great also make their relative obscurity baffling ...[and] An unequivocally fantastic album from an equivocal Band of “Susans,” Here Comes Success is ripe for rediscovery"

== Cover and images ==
Band leader Robert Poss is a Rambler automobile fan with a particular interest in Rambler Marlins. An official American Motors Corporation (AMC) factory publicity photograph of the 1965 Marlin is the cover art for the Here Comes Success album, and the car's hood ornament is the art on the CD itself.

== Track listing ==
All tracks are written by Robert Poss and Susan Stenger.

| No. | Title | Length |
|---|---|---|
| 1. | "Elizabeth Stride (1843–1888)" | 9:06 |
| 2. | "Dirge" | 8:11 |
| 3. | "Hell Bent" | 9:23 |
| 4. | "Pardon My French" | 6:55 |
| 5. | "As Luck Would Have It" | 0:54 |
| 6. | "Two Jacks" | 7:32 |
| 7. | "Stone Like a Heart" | 7:41 |
| 8. | "In the Eye of the Beholder (For Rhys)" | 10:00 |
| 9. | "Sermon on Competition, Part 1 (Nothing Is Recoupable)" | 4:30 |

== Personnel ==
Adapted from Here Comes Success liner notes.

- Anne Husick – electric guitar
- Mark Lonergan – electric guitar
- Robert Poss – electric guitar, vocals, production
- Ron Spitzer – drums
- Susan Stenger – bass guitar, vocals

=== Production ===
- Bryce Goggin – engineering
- Royston Langdon – assistant engineer

== Release history ==
| Region | Date | Label | Format | Catalog |
|---|---|---|---|---|
| United States | 1995 | Restless | CD | 7 72789 |
| United Kingdom | 1995 | Blast First | CD, LP | BFFP114 |
