= Wipers Live =

Wipers

Live album by Wipers
- Released: 1985
- Recorded: 1984
- Genre: Punk rock
- Length: 43:18
- Label: Enigma Records

Wipers chronology
Over the Edge (1983)	Wipers (1985)	Land of the Lost (1986)

Professional ratings
Review scores
Source	Rating
Allmusic	2/5 stars
MusicHound Rock	3.5/5

Wipers is a self-titled live album by punk rock band Wipers, recorded between February and March 1984 and released in 1985 by Enigma Records. It had previously been issued by the band's own Trap Records as a cassette-only release titled Wipers Tour 84. It was later reissued as Wipers by Restless and band leader Greg Sage's Zeno Records.

== Track listing ==
1. "Pushing the Extreme" - 4:40
2. "Messenger" - 2:00
3. "Moon Rider" - 4:24
4. "Doom Town" - 4:17
5. "Think About It" - 2:50
6. "Potential Suicide" - 3:50
7. "D-7" - 5:00
8. "Now Is the Time" - 2:55
9. "Tell Me" - 2:28
10. "Window Shop for Love" - 4:02
11. "Youth of America" - 7:47
