= Blessing and Curse (disambiguation) =

Blessing and Curse is a 1987 EP by Band of Susans.

It may also refer to:

- A Blessing and a Curse (2006), the sixth studio album by Drive-By Truckers
- Blessing and curses of Christ in the New Testament
- "Blessing and a Curse" (2018), a song by Poo Bear from his debut album Poo Bear Presents Bearthday Music
- "The Blessing and the Curse", a song by Phinehas from their 2013 album The Last Word Is Yours to Speak
