= James Chasse =

2006 police killing in Portland, Oregon, US

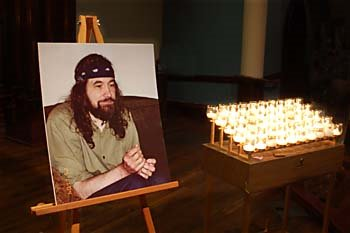
James Chasse from his memorial

James Philip Chasse, Jr. (May 7, 1964 – September 17, 2006) was an American from Portland, Oregon. In 2006 his death while in the custody of Portland law enforcement officers caused an outcry over civil rights and an examination of the lack of mental health crisis management training given to Portland police officers. At the time of his death, he was living in an apartment in downtown Portland and had been diagnosed with schizophrenia.

== Death ==
James Chasse, surrounded by police and medical personnel. He later died of the injuries inflicted during his arrest.

Chasse died after a physical confrontation with two Portland Police officers and a Multnomah County deputy on September 17, 2006. Officers at the scene described Chasse as a homeless person and said that he ran away from them and fought with them. He was beaten and a Taser was employed multiple times on him. After the incident, Chasse was cleared medically by fire and ambulance personnel. He was then restrained and driven to jail, where nursing staff refused to admit him because of his injuries. The officers were told by jail staff to drive him to a hospital across town. He died en route.

Chasse suffered fractures in 16 of his ribs and had a total of 26 broken bones, as well as a punctured lung, broken collar bone and torn spleen. The Multnomah County Medical Examiner ruled the cause of death to be both "accidental" and the result of "blunt force trauma".

Over 500 friends and family members remembered Chasse at a candlelight vigil and memorial on October 14, 2006.

== Reports ==
After three years and public pressure, the Portland Police Bureau released an internal investigation on the death of Chasse. The investigation included six items, a "detective notebook" with six photos by witness Jamie Marquez, two separate two page disciplinary letters to Portland Police officers Kyle Nice and Christopher Humphreys, suspending them for 80 hours without pay. Both were disciplined for unacceptable conduct and violation of the department's taser policy. After arbitration in July 2012 with the police union, both letters were revoked and Nice and Humphreys were repaid for time lost. "IAD" or "Internal Affairs Division" is a 389-page report including witness, expert and officer interviews, case chronology and exhibits. Detectives included Portland's training manual about mental illness, and a 623-page narrative (archived here in three parts) review of Chasse's killing with redacted training materials.

The city's auditor commissioned an investigation on the investigation of the death of Chasse in July 2010.

== Public outcry ==
Chasse's death produced an outcry in the Oregon media, with hundreds of news stories, editorials and front-page articles following the case, and from civil rights and mental health advocates. Although Multnomah County District Attorney Michael Schrunk failed to bring an indictment against the officers, he did release all testimony presented to the grand jury. Portland mayor Tom Potter apologized to the Chasse family, convened a Mental Health Task Force to review the city's policies, and implemented a crisis intervention training program to improve the way in which city and county police respond to situations involving mental illness, but failed to discipline the officers who beat Chasse: Kyle Nice, Christopher Humphreys and Bret Barton.

A documentary film about Chasse, Alien Boy: The Life and Death of James Chasse, made by Oregon filmmaker Brian Lindstrom, premiered on February 15, 2013, in Portland. Chasse was friends with members of Portland punk band the Wipers, and this friendship was the inspiration for the band's song "Alien Boy", from which the name of the film is taken.

== See also ==
- List of killings by law enforcement officers in the United States
