= Straight Ahead (Greg Sage album) =

Studio album by Greg Sage
- Released: 1985
- Genre: Punk rock
- Length: 39:33
- Label: Restless Records
- Producer: Greg Sage

Greg Sage chronology
Straight Ahead (1985)	Best of the Wipers and Greg Sage (1990)

Professional ratings
Review scores
Source	Rating
Allmusic	4/5 stars
MusicHound Rock	3.5/5

Straight Ahead is the debut solo album of Wipers frontman Greg Sage. It was released in 1985.

Sage said of this album, "After I recorded Over The Edge, I had $5,000 invested into that record. The record company went bankrupt, so they took the money and started a new label. We got screwed and I had no way of paying back the debt, so that was the end of The Wipers. I was out in the Mohave desert and I wrote a bunch of songs on the acoustic guitar, I fixed a tape recorder for somebody. An eight track recorder, so I got to use it for a month as a fee for fixing it, I guess. I just recorded those songs. Then one day someone called from a record label, a guy that used to work for the label that screwed us, and he said "I feel sorry for you guys" and I told him that I didn't have any Wipers stuff for him and that The Wipers didn't exist anymore. Anyway, the label, licensed Straight Ahead, a live record, some old tapes and basically got me out of debt for Over The Edge. If I never recorded those songs, Over The Edge would've been The Wipers' last record."

== Track listing ==
All songs written by Greg Sage:

1. "Straight Ahead" - 4:12
2. "Soul's Tongue" - 2:45
3. "Blue Cowboy" - 3:10
4. "Your Empathy" - 2:58
5. "The Illusion Fades" - 2:37
6. "Seems So Clear" - 1:35
7. "On the Run" - 2:12
8. "Astro Cloud" - 4:08
9. "Lost in Space" - 3:25
10. "Let It Go" - 3:08
11. "World Without Fear" - 5:05
12. "Keep on Keepin' On" - 4:22
