= Romeo (Wipers song) =

Single by Wipers
- B-side: "No Solution"
- Released: 1982
- Recorded: 1981
- Genre: Punk rock
- Label: Trap Records
- Songwriter: Greg Sage
- Producer: Greg Sage

Wipers singles chronology
"Alien Boy" (1980)	"Romeo" (1982)	"Silver Sail" (1993)

"Romeo" is the second single (2008) by punk rock band Wipers.

Along with B-side "No Solution", it was recorded during the Youth of America sessions in a small studio in Vancouver, Washington. After deciding it did not fit with the idea behind the Youth of America album, it was released as a 7" single on leader Greg Sage's own Trap Records.

Both the "Romeo" single and Youth of America album featured members of Stiphnoyds, a band who also recorded on Trap. The DeShazer brothers, Craig and Steve, Bryan and Matt Wilson played trombones and trumpet on the track, while Brad Naish played drums.

"Romeo" was later rerecorded for 1983 Wipers album Over the Edge.
