= Labradford (album) =

Studio album by Labradford
- Released: November 12, 1996
- Studio: Sound of Music Recording Studios (Richmond, Virginia)
- Genre: Post-rock; ambient; drone
- Length: 39:44
- Label: Blast First; Kranky

Labradford chronology
A Stable Reference (1995)	Labradford (1996)	Mi Media Naranja (1997)

Professional ratings
Review scores
Source	Rating
AllMusic	4/5 stars
Alternative Press	4/5
Chicago Tribune	3.5/4 stars
Entertainment Weekly	B+
The Guardian	3/5 stars
Q	3/5 stars
Select	4/5

Labradford is the third studio album by American post-rock band Labradford. It was released on November 12, 1996, by Blast First and Kranky.

== Track listing ==
All tracks are written by Carter Brown, Robert Donne and Mark Nelson.

No.	Title	Length
1.	"Phantom Channel Crossing"	4:43
2.	"Mid-Range"	6:29
3.	"Pico"	5:46
4.	"The Cipher"	3:11
5.	"Lake Speed"	6:46
6.	"Scenic Recovery"	4:51
7.	"Battered"	7:58

== Personnel ==
Adapted from the Labradford liner notes.

Labradford

- Carter Brown – keyboards
- Robert Donne – bass guitar
- Mark Nelson – vocals, guitar

Additional musicians

- Chris Johnston – violin

Production and additional personnel

- Mike Carosi – cover art
- Labradford – recording, mixing
- John Morand – recording, mixing

== Release history ==
Region	Date	Label	Format	Catalog
United States	1996	Kranky	CD, LP	krank 013
United Kingdom	1996	Blast First	CD, LP	BFFP 136
