= The Word and the Flesh =

Studio album by Band of Susans
- Released: September 13, 1991
- Recorded: May–June 1990
- Studios: Platinum Island, New York City
- Genres: Noise rock; shoegazing; alternative rock
- Length: 57:21
- Labels: Restless; Rough Trade
- Producer: Robert Poss

Band of Susans chronology
Love Agenda (1989)	The Word and the Flesh (1991)	The Peel Sessions (1992)

The Word and the Flesh is the third studio album and fourth album overall by American noise rock band Band of Susans. For the first time in the band's history, they were able to find a settled lineup to back up the band's core-line up of band leader Robert Poss, Susan Stenger and drummer Ron Spitzer, after Karen Higlof and Page Hamilton departed the band following the release of Love Agenda (1989). With Anne Husick and Mark Lonergan replacing them, the band entered their "classic line-up" and recording The Word and the Flesh in New York City in spring 1990, with Poss acting as producer.

The album was the band's "tribute to the E chord", and is often considered to the band's most accessible album, with a less reverbed guitar sound and more song-orientated approach than before. The final track, "Guitar Trio" is a work from when Poss and Stenger worked with experimental composer Rhys Chatham in the 1980s. The Word and the Flesh was belatedly released in September 1991 by Restless Records. It originally received mostly positive reviews from music critics from a variety of magazines. Over time, its legacy has been increasingly positive, with one review calling it "perhaps the finest hour by the Susans," and in 2014, music journalist Andrew Earles included the album in his book Gimme Indie Rock: 500 Essential American Underground Rock Albums 1981–1996.

== Background and recording ==
When Band of Susans formed in New York City in 1986, they consisted of Robert Poss (guitar and vocals), Susan Stenger (bass and vocals), Ron Spitzer (drums), with Susan Lyall (guitar), Susan Tallman (guitar), and Alva Rogers (vocals), and took their name from the trio of Susans then in the lineup. Poss, Stenger, and Spitzer grew up together in Buffalo, New York. After releasing their début album Hope Against Hope (1988), Rogers, Lyall and Tallman quit, and were replaced by Karen Haglof (guitar) and Page Hamilton (guitar). The new line-up recorded the band's second album, Love Agenda (1989), and a Peel Sessions EP that was not released until 1992, but the two new guitarists ultimately quit, with Haglof attending medical school and Hamilton quickly forming the more metal-influenced Helmet.

In 1990, Anne Husick (guitar) and Mark Lonergan (guitar) replaced the two former guitarists, thus creating the band's "classic lineup". In an interview with The Chicago Tribune, who considered the line-up to "so successfully subsume their individual abilities to the group aesthetic," Poss said "it's hard to find people who are both talented and restrained. The guitar ethos is this male, masturbatory thing in that if you play guitar and you're good the first thing you want to do is show people how good you are and how much you know. Many virtuoso instrumentalists lack the discipline and focus of knowing when not to play." The band signed to independent label Restless Records and began work on their third album at the start of the same year. The album was recorded at Platinum Sound Recording Studios in New York City in May and June 1990 with engineer Oz Fritz. As with the band's prior albums, Poss was the sole producer of the album. Chris Gerhinger mastered the album at The Hit Factory, a New York recording studio famous for its clientele.

== Music ==
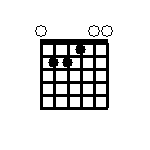
The band considered the album to a tribute to the E guitar chord.

The band considered The Word and the Flesh to be their "tribute to the E chord," and is considered by several critics to be the band's most accessible album, opting for a less reverbed guitar sound than before. Chris Parker of Allmusic said that "despite featuring their third pair of guitarists in as many albums, [The Word and the Flesh sees] Band of Susans deliver their most assured, accessible album." Michael Peitti of Tucson Weekly said that the album was "gorgeous, buzzing [and] the most accessible" by the band. Music journalist Andrew Earles called it the band's "strongest rock-centric, song-concerned album, and their first with genuine hooks/catchiness rather than just melodies." Punk Auction said the album "employed a more focused attack, typified by a lesser emphasis on reverb and feedback, to arrive at a more accessible sound." Trouser Press said the album features "even fine-tunes [and] the Susans' dedication to both content and presentation" and noted how "the resolute maelstrom of guitar pressure, which — as distinct from the Jesus and Mary Chain's fuzz — is kept on a strict low-reverb diet and carefully assembled into a roar of distinct instruments rather than one hazy propwash."

Parker commented that "the guitars operate as interlocking pieces of a larger puzzle, while bassist Susan Stenger floats below, providing structure without being chained to the beat. The sound alternates between haunting and crushing, and the guitars are finally consistently corralled into the dramatic service of the song. The clean, nearly reverb-less guitar sound leaves plenty of room to hear the guitars' idiosyncratic directions while maintaining a nearly opaque wall of sound." He described "Plot Twist" and "Silver Lining" as examples of songs when "the band breaks loose from their throbbing chords to deliver a crunchy punch to the solar plexus," but noted that, "mostly, though, the effect is of rich lattices of guitar and intermingling swells, lifting and propelling the songs through an omnipresent guitar drone. Bassist Stenger's throaty vocals add a moody counterpoint to the guitars' pitched screech and anchor the album's opening two tracks, not incidentally two of the better compositions on the disc." He later referred to the album is being based around songcraft.

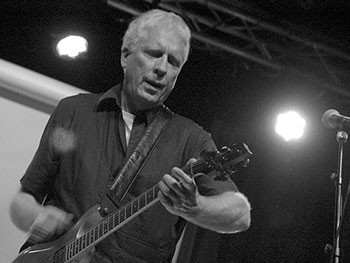
"Guitar Trio" is a cover of a piece by the band's former collaborator, composer Rhys Chatham.

"Tilt", described by Onda Rock as "a truly shocking piece for the volume and dynamic outcomes to which it arrives," was initially included in Poss' demo tape of four tracks, where he added "the song of Susan Stenger (who also adapted the text of my fist)." He recalled that he had recorded the intro feedback guitar inside the loft of Nicolas Collins, and used two electric basses and distorted drum machine rather crude. It became one of his favorite tracks. The album closes with the thirteen minute "Guitar Trio", a cover version of the "hypnotic, slow-building fugue" of the same name by experimental American guitarist and experimental composer Rhys Chatham, which, as the name suggests, was composed for three electric guitars, and suited the band as they had a trio of guitarists. Poss considered Chatham a former mentor, as numerous members of the band began their careers in Chatham's ensembles. According to one commentary, "this parallels the way that members of fellow NYC noise rockers Sonic Youth began their careers in Branca's ensembles; Thurston Moore of Sonic Youth did play with Chatham as well."

Despite how critics have characterized the album, Poss has retrospectively stated that the album was very much a sonic project instead of a melodic one, and in an interview with Onda Rock, Poss said "the melody I've never been entirely concerned. I'm pretty obsessed with texture and architecture of sound. By repetition, the level, space, distortion density. I love the interactions between seals and lines that generate ghost motifs, melodies and subliminal sounds. I like mysterious reasons, buried, the sounds that are fighting against each other to be heard in opposition to the standardization of "battery-hand-and everything else subordinate to this" that characterizes a large part of rock music, even the same noise-rock. The Word and the Flesh sounds as if the listener's head had been squashed in the middle amplifier, so to speak."

== Release ==
The album was released in mid-September 1991 by Restless Records in the United States, and by Rough Trade Records in Germany. The album cover, photographed by Geoffrey Notkin, features Poss' red SC-1 guitar, manufactured by G&L Musical Instruments. His other guitars of the same model had featured on other album sleeves by the band, and in 2009 Poss said that "the metonymic significance of my SC-1 reached its zenith when the guitar was used as the central design motif for our Love Agenda, The Word and The Flesh and Peel Sessions CDs." Dale Hyatt and Leo Fender provided the band with their G & L guitars, and the latter was a "rabid Band of Susans fan." The back cover features a 1960 artwork by Karel Plicka. The album is dedicated to Julius Eastman.

As with the band's other releases, it was not a commercial success. According to The Great Indie Discography book, "unfortunately, success is the one thing that has eluded the Band of Susans and Co. throughout their decade-plus lifespan." "Now is Now" was featured on Restless Records' compilation A Restless World in 1991, and the same song was remixed for the band's 1992 EP Now. Describing the remix, Trouser Press said it was "fine but unessential, as is the quintet's seductively subdued interpretation of the Stones' "Paint It, Black.""

== Critical reception ==
Professional ratings
Review scores
Source	Rating
Allmusic	4.5/5 stars
The Boston Phoenix	(favourable)
Melody Maker	(favourable)
NME	(favourable)
Spin	(mixed)

The album received very positive reviews from music critics. The Boston Phoenix called it "a refreshingly joyful noise....Essential." The NME said the album was "nothing less than pure, demonic euphoria." CMJ called the album "a three-guitar wall of gorgeous tumult," whilst Rockpool referred to it as "probably the sleeper of the year," predicting it to be a sleeper hit. Sounds were very favourable, saying "this will blow yer fuckin head right off....This is utterly dazzling." Alternative Press called it "a feast for the guitar-rock aficionado," whilst Melody Maker called it "molten passion."

A more mixed review came from Ivan Kreilkamp of Spin, who said "a band with a big booming sound must take care not to fall into empty portentiousness. When Thaila Zedek sang for Live Skull–a group often sharing Band of Susans' Glenn Branca trained New York guitar drone heritage–she always managed, with a phrase as simple as "It's not really having fun / it's like trying to forget someone," to pin a recognizable emotion to the vast swell of the music. This is a trick Band of Susans doesn't always pull off. The Word and the Flesh suggests a penchant for abstract allegory that the song titles "Ice Age" and "Estranged Labor" distressingly confirm. And "Sermon on Competition, Part 2," offering the promise of a sense of humor, only delivers "Some day I'll make you crawl / some day I'll have it all," sung in the gothic wall of a herald of capitalist doom. No doubt about it, Band of Susans is affected by a bad case of self-importance that undermines its nice big guitar sound." However, he commented that "there are exceptions, especially the no-nonsense "Now is Now," which achieves real propulsive force and infuses a line like "You know she'll always be there when she needs you" with bracing sarcasm."

Over time, the album has received increasingly more well received. In a retrospective review, Chris Parker of Allmusic rated the album four and a half stars out of five and said "despite featuring their third pair of guitarists in as many albums, Band of Susans deliver their most assured, accessible album.". He said that "most rewarding are the moments when the band breaks loose from their throbbing chords to deliver a crunchy punch to the solar plexus, such as on "Plot Twist" and "Silver Lining." Mostly, though, the effect is of rich lattices of guitar and intermingling swells, lifting and propelling the songs through an omnipresent guitar drone." Michael Petitti of Tucson Weekly, in another retrospective commentary, said the album was "gorgeous [and] buzzing" and "perhaps [the] finest hour by the Susans."

In 2014, music journalist Andrew Earles included the album in his book Gimme Indie Rock: 500 Essential American Underground Rock Albums 1981–1996, one of two Band of Susans albums included in the list, alongside Here Comes Success (1995). Earles commented that is the "strongest" of their "rock-centered, song-concerned" albums and that it was their first album to feature "genuine hooks/catchiness rather than just melodies." The album is also positively referred to in The Rough Guide to Rock.

== Track listing ==
1. "Ice Age" (Robert Poss, Susan Stenger) - 5:29
2. "Now Is Now" (Robert Poss, Susan Stenger) - 4:36
3. "Trouble Follows" (Robert Poss) - 3:25
4. "Plot Twist" (Robert Poss) - 4:22
5. "Estranged Labor" (Robert Poss, Susan Stenger) - 4:41
6. "Sermon On Competition, Part 2" (Robert Poss, Susan Stenger) - 5:00
7. "Bitter and Twisted" (Robert Poss) - 3:13
8. "Bad Timing" (Robert Poss) - 3:27
9. "Tilt" (Robert Poss) - 5:06
10. "Silver Lining" (Robert Poss) - 4:42
11. "Guitar Trio" (Rhys Chatham) - 13:20

== Personnel ==
- Robert Poss - guitar, vocals
- Susan Stenger - bass, vocals
- Mark Lonergan - guitar
- Anne Husick - guitar
- Ron Spitzer - drums

Technical

- Oz Fritz - engineer
- Steve Wellner - assistant engineer
- Chris Gehringer - mastering
