= Fixed::Context =

Studio album by Labradford
- Released: February 26, 2001
- Recorded: July 2000
- Studio: Electrical Audio (Chicago, Illinois)
- Genre: Post-rock, ambient
- Length: 37:07
- Label: Blast First/Kranky
- Producer: Steve Albini

Labradford chronology
| E Luxo So (1999) | Fixed::Context (2001) |

Professional ratings
Review scores
| Source | Rating |
|---|---|
| AllMusic | 4/5 stars |
| Alternative Press | 4/5 stars |
| NME | 7/10 |
| Pitchfork | 8.0/10 |
| Q | 4/5 stars |

Fixed::Context is the sixth studio album by the Virginian post-rock band Labradford. It was released in 2001 by Blast First and Kranky.

== Critical reception ==
The Guardian wrote that the songs are "all instrumental and all based around an echoey guitar effect that sounds like Duane Eddy playing the theme to Twin Peaks." The Dallas Observer called the album "a patiently unfolding tapestry of forgotten memories and the subconscious pleasure of a mind set adrift."

== Track listing ==
All lyrics are written by Mark Nelson; all music is composed by Labradford.

| No. | Title | Length |
|---|---|---|
| 1. | "Twenty" | 18:27 |
| 2. | "Up to Pizmo" | 6:21 |
| 3. | "David" | 6:35 |
| 4. | "Wien" | 5:44 |

== Personnel ==
Adapted from the Fixed::Context liner notes.

Labradford

- Carter Brown – keyboards
- Robert Donne – bass guitar
- Mark Nelson – vocals, guitar

Production and additional personnel

- Steve Albini – production, recording, mixing
- Robert Gallerani – design
- Labradford – recording, mixing

== Release history ==
| Region | Date | Label | Format | Catalog |
|---|---|---|---|---|
| United States | 2001 | Blast First | CD, LP | krank 037 |
| United States | 2001 | Kranky | CD, LP | BFFP 157 |
