= Youth of America =

Studio album by Wipers
- Released: 1981
- Recorded: Late 1980
- Studios: Wave Sound, Vancouver, Washington
- Genres: Punk; post-punk; garage rock; gothic rock; proto-grunge
- Length: 30:40
- Label: Park Avenue
- Producer: Greg Sage

Wipers chronology
Alien Boy (1980)	Youth of America (1981)	Over the Edge (1983)

Youth of America is the second studio album by American punk rock band Wipers. It was released in 1981 by record label Park Avenue. Representing a change from the band's previous punk style, the album takes on a more complex, post-punk style, and has received acclaim as a seminal album in their discography.

== Background ==
After releasing their debut album, Is This Real?, the band underwent a lineup change, with lead songwriter Greg Sage being joined by bassist Brad Davidson and drummer Brad Naish.

== Content ==
The album marked a distinctive change in the band's sound. Compared to its predecessor, Is This Real?, which was composed mostly of raw, sleek and relatively traditional songs, Youth of America featured much longer and more complex compositions; the title track alone clocks in at over 10 minutes. According to frontman Greg Sage, this change of pace was a deliberate counter-reaction against the trend of releasing short songs, which many punk bands did at the time.

The Quietus noted the album's genre as post-punk and further described its style as "a six track set of lowly garage rock which traverses the cosmos irrespective. Secondly, it's a gothic downer but leavened by motion and momentum thanks to its krautrock influences. And lastly it's a grittily real punk record defined by an unerring air of unreality – as unromantic as it is fantastical". Rolling Stone has called the record "proto-grunge", and bands such as Melvins, Nirvana and Hole have covered their work.

== Release and reception ==
Professional ratings
Review scores
Source	Rating
AllMusic	4.5/5 stars
The Boston Phoenix	3/4 stars
The Great Alternative & Indie Discography	6/10
MusicHound Rock	5/5 stars
OndaRock	7.5/10
Pitchfork	9.1/10
The Rolling Stone Record Guide	3/5 stars
Sound	3.5/5 stars
Spin Alternative Record Guide	5/10

Released in 1981, Youth of America was, according to Sage, not well received in the United States at the time of its release, but fared better in Europe. Milo Miles of The Boston Phoenix had mixed feelings about the album's tracks: "The side-long epic 'Youth of America' sags over the long haul, since no amount of innocent determination could keep such a ream of guitar psychodoodles free from Ted Nugent blots. But the other lengthy track, 'After It's Over,' leaps headlong into a frantic ascending riff, and never lets go."

In its retrospective review, Consequence of Sound wrote, "(f)rom its style of production and songwriting to its driving, angular guitar work coupled with anthemic hooks, Youth of America is as strong and fresh-sounding today as it was 30 years ago". The Quietus wrote "there may be more essential punk albums out there but never again did the genre sound so searching". Head Heritage noted its "enduring legacy".

Youth of America was later reissued on record labels Backbone and Restless, with different covers for each, and on Sage's own Zeno Records as the second disc of the Wipers Box Set, albeit with a different running order to the original vinyl issue.

== Legacy ==
Along with other Wipers records, Youth of America has since come to be acknowledged as an important album in the development of American underground and independent rock movements of the early 1980s. Thurston Moore of Sonic Youth cited the album as an inspiration, and covered the track "Pushing the Extreme" with Keith Nealy for Wipers tribute album Fourteen Songs for Greg Sage and the Wipers.

The title track was covered by Melvins on their 2001 album Electroretard and by Mission of Burma on the live album Snapshot. Kurt Cobain listed it in his top 50 albums of all time.

Pitchfork ranked the title track at No. 173 on their list of "The 200 Best Songs of the 1980s" and ranked the album at No. 102 on their list of "The 200 Best Albums of the 1980s".

== Track listing ==
All tracks are written by Greg Sage.

Side A
No.	Title	Length
1.	"Taking Too Long"	3:05
2.	"Can This Be"	2:55
3.	"Pushing the Extreme"	3:15
4.	"When It's Over"	6:30

Side B
No.	Title	Length
1.	"No Fair"	4:25
2.	"Youth of America"	10:30

== Personnel ==
- Greg Sage – vocals, guitar, piano, production, recording
- Brad Davidson – bass guitar, tape operation assistance
- Dave Koupal – bass guitar
- Brad Naish – drums
