= Land of the Lost (Wipers album) =

Studio album by Wipers
- Released: 1986
- Recorded: 1986
- Genre: Punk rock
- Length: 33:54
- Label: Restless
- Producer: Greg Sage

Wipers chronology
| Wipers (1985) | Land of the Lost (1986) | Follow Blind (1987) |

Land of the Lost is the fourth studio album by punk rock band Wipers, released by Restless in 1986. The album was recorded at frontman Greg Sage's studio, 421 Sound, in Portland, Oregon. "Let Me Know" appears on the soundtrack to the 1986 film River's Edge.

It was reissued on CDR on Sage's Zeno Records, and by German label Gift of Life in 1991.

== Critical reception ==
Professional ratings
Review scores
| Source | Rating |
|---|---|
| AllMusic | 3.5/5 stars |
| The Encyclopedia of Popular Music | 3/5 stars |
| The Great Alternative & Indie Discography | 6/10 |
| MusicHound Rock: The Essential Album Guide | 4/5 stars |
| Ox-Fanzine | 5/5 stars |
| Spin Alternative Record Guide | 7/10 |

Maximum Rocknroll praised the title track, writing: "Heavier and riffier than anything the Wipers had previously attempted, 'Land of the Lost' hits like a steamroller on an inexorable march forward." The Spin Alternative Record Guide called the album "the most definitive Wipers record for sound and songwriting, though it lacks the brashness that makes Over the Edge such a joy."

== Track listing ==
All songs written by Greg Sage.

1. "Just a Dream Away" - 3:16
2. "Way of Love" - 2:11
3. "Let Me Know" - 3:03
4. "Fair Weather Friends" - 3:16
5. "Land of the Lost" - 4:48
6. "Nothing Left to Lose" - 4:51
7. "The Search" - 4:16
8. "Different Ways" - 4:32
9. "Just Say" - 3:39

== Personnel ==
- Greg Sage – vocals, guitar, harp; producer; recorded by Greg Sage
- Brad Davidson – bass guitar
- Steve Plouf – drums
- Chris Newman – cover art
