= Hope Against Hope =

Hope Against Hope may refer to:

- an autobiographical work by Nadezhda Mandelshtam covering the period of Stalinism
- Hope Against Hope (album), a noise rock album released in 1988.
