= E Luxo So =

Studio album by Labradford
- Released: July 13, 1999
- Recorded: Sound of Music Recording Studios (Richmond, VA)
- Genre: Post-rock, art rock, ambient
- Length: 39:04
- Label: Blast First/Kranky

Labradford chronology
Mi Media Naranja (1997)	E Luxo So (1999)	Fixed::Context (2001)

Professional ratings
Review scores
Source	Rating
AllMusic	4/5 stars
NME	(8/10)
Pitchfork Media	(5.3/10)

E Luxo So is the fifth studio album by the Virginian post-rock band Labradford, released on July 13, 1999, by Blast First and Kranky. The titles of the album's six songs are made up of the recording and production credits. Track 4, "By Chris Johnston, Craig Markva, Jamie Evans," was used in several episodes of the HBO miniseries The Young Pope.

== Track listing ==
All lyrics are written by Mark Nelson; all music is composed by Labradford.

No.	Title	Length
1.	"Recorded and Mixed at Sound of Music, Richmond, Va."	7:50
2.	"With John Morand and Assisted by Brian Hoffa."	5:43
3.	"Dulcimers Played by Peter Neff. Strings Played"	5:09
4.	"By Chris Johnston, Craig Markva, Jamie Evans,"	5:04
5.	"And Jonathan Morken. Photo Provided By"	7:19
6.	"Leta O'Steen. Design Assistance by John Piper."	7:59

== Personnel ==
Adapted from the E Luxo So liner notes.

Labradford

- Carter Brown – keyboards
- Robert Donne – bass guitar
- Mark Nelson – vocals, guitar

Additional musicians

- Jamie Evans – violin
- Chris Johnston – violin
- Craig Markva – violin
- Jonathan Morken – violin
- Peter Neff – Hammered dulcimer

Production and additional personnel

- Bryan Hoffa – assistant engineering
- Claire Lewis – production
- John Morand – recording, mixing
- Leta O'Steen – photography
- John Piper – design

== Release history ==
Region	Date	Label	Format	Catalog
United States	1999	Kranky	CD, LP	krank 037
United Kingdom	1999	Blast First	CD, LP	BFFP 157
