= Over the Edge (Wipers album) =

Studio album by Wipers
- Released: 1983
- Recorded: 1982
- Genre: Punk rock
- Length: 36:26
- Labels: Brain Eater; Trap

Wipers chronology
Youth of America (1981)	Over the Edge (1983)	Wipers (1985)

Over the Edge is the third studio album by the American punk rock band Wipers, released in 1983. It has generally shorter songs than its predecessor, Youth of America.

Originally released on Brain Eater Records and Greg Sage's label, Trap, in 1983, it was later reissued by Restless Records, and then reissued and remastered on Sage's Zeno Records as part of the Wipers Box Set. A different recording of "Romeo" was released as a 1982 single on Trap, with "No Solution" on the B-side.

== Release ==
After the release of their previous albums, Is This Real? and Youth of America, the band would record and release Over the Edge, which would garner them their first airplay and attention.

== Reception ==
Professional ratings
Review scores
Source	Rating
AllMusic	4.5/5 stars
The Great Alternative & Indie Discography	8/10
MusicHound Rock	4/5 stars
OndaRock	8.5/10
Record Collector	5/5 stars
Spin Alternative Record Guide	8/10

Over the Edge has received, and continues to receive, critical acclaim like both of its predecessors. The album, Jack Rabid wrote for Trouser Press, "is as appealing [as Youth of America], with some of Sage’s most memorable songs. The thick title track [...], plus the simmering “Doom Town” and the roaring “So Young” define the Wipers’ dense, methodical, chunky aggression, with heavy, cloudy guitar." According to Andy Kellman of AllMusic, the album "is a kind of classic; it might have been created with guitars and drums, and it might have verse-chorus-verse song structures, but it's doubtful that Wipers were allowing any influences to creep into the record." "Despite the fusion of punk and pop," he notes, "the record hardly mirrors the bands that would later be called punk-pop. In fact, this collision of the two elements makes what followed decades later seem twee. There's just too much blood and sweat, and there's too much tightly wound tension released."

In a Pitchfork retrospective on the band, Nick Sylvester wrote that the album "has the needle moving back toward straight-up punk. There are tricks here, but they're under the hood, not as explicitly artsy as what was happening on Youth of America. To me, these are his best songs on nearly every level: concise and immediate but recorded in that contrarian, distinctly Sage-like way. [...] Like the first moments of Is This Real?, Over the Edge leads with a curious, stage-setting guitar tone. [...] [It] has nearly zero low-end information, as if Sage played it out of an alarm clock radio." "This one decision" he concludes, "is at the heart of what makes Over the Edge so beguiling-- immediate songs that sound out of reach." In a perfect score review of the album's reissue, Paul Rigby of Record Collector noted that "this brilliant 1983 album mixes pop and punk in a manner that lifts both genres without diluting either. With a strong, edgy presentation, Over the Edge releases the pressures of life directly into your head, while providing an originality all too often missing from their peers."

== Legacy ==
In 1989, Dutch magazine OOR ranked it the 23rd best album of the 1980s. Along with the band's first two albums Is This Real? and Youth of America, Kurt Cobain listed Over the Edge in his top 50 albums of all time. The title track was covered by Hole, Mono Men, Bored!, Red Fang and several others. "Messenger" has been covered by Mazes. J Mascis cites Greg Sage's guitarwork on the album as a foundational influence.

== Track listing ==
All tracks are written by Greg Sage.

No.	Title	Length
1.	"Over the Edge"	3:49
2.	"Doom Town"	3:56
3.	"So Young"	4:17
4.	"Messenger"	1:54
5.	"Romeo"	4:05
6.	"Now Is the Time"	3:02
7.	"What Is"	2:19
8.	"No One Wants an Alien"	3:23
9.	"The Lonely One"	3:38
10.	"No Generation Gap"	3:09
11.	"This Time"	2:54
