= Dirty Duck (Portland, Oregon) =

Former tavern in Portland, Oregon, U.S.

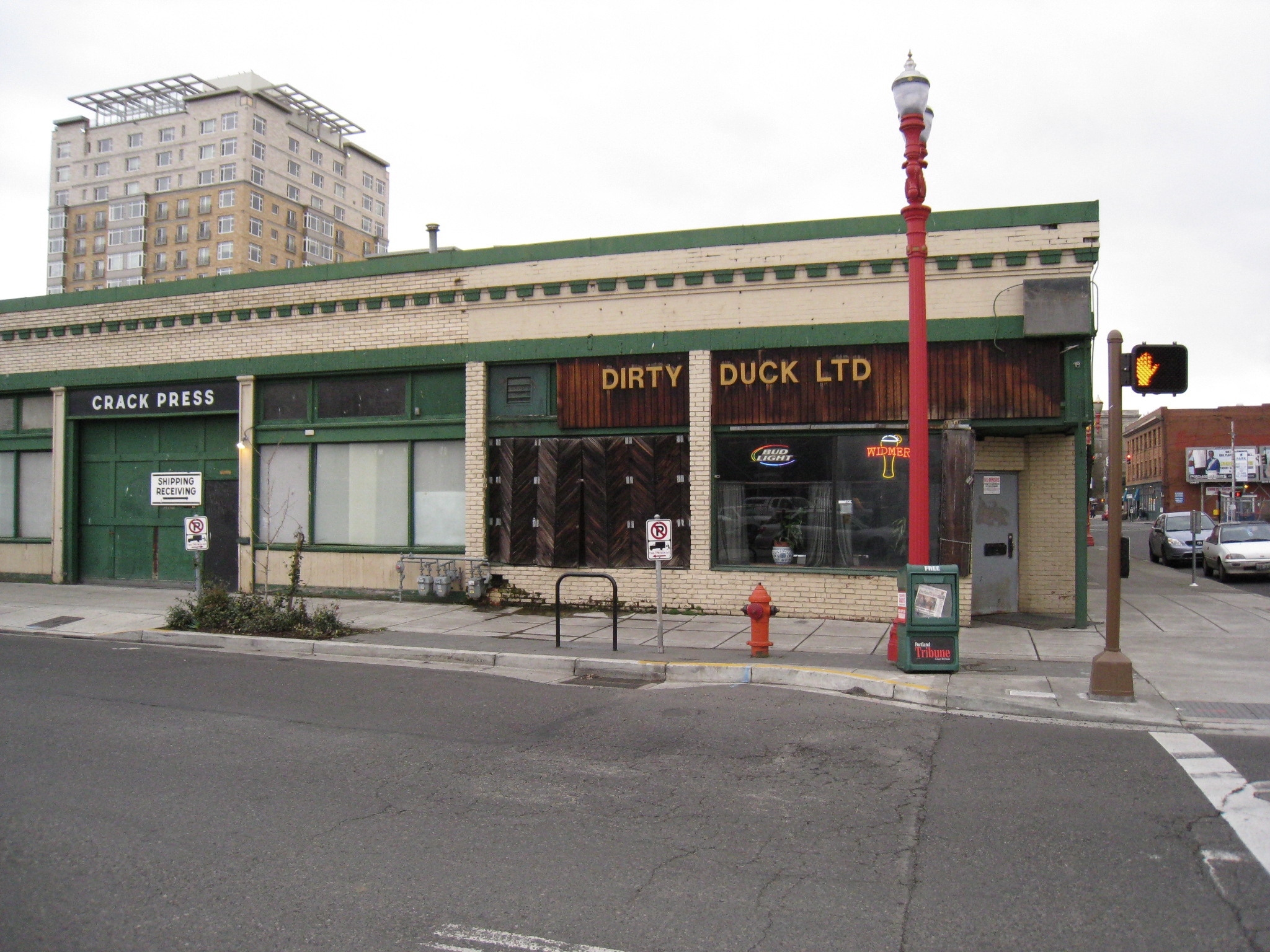
- The building, March 2009

- Location in Portland, Oregon
- Former names: Kiernan Building

General information
- Location: 421–439 NW 3rd Avenue, Portland, Oregon, United States
- Coordinates: 45.5265°N 122.6738°W
- Completed: 1917
- Demolished: c. 2010
- Dirty Duck Tavern
- U.S. Historic district – Contributing property
- Part of: Portland New Chinatown–Japantown Historic District (ID89001957)
- Added to NRHP: November 21, 1989

The Dirty Duck building, or Dirty Duck Tavern building, was located at the intersection of Northwest Third Avenue and Glisan Street in Portland, Oregon's Old Town Chinatown neighborhood, in the United States. Originally called the Kiernan Building, the one-story structure earned its nickname from Gail's Dirty Duck Tavern, a gay bar that served as a tenant for 25 years.

== Description and history ==
The one-story building was constructed during 1916–1917. It became a contributing structure to the Portland New Chinatown–Japantown Historic District.

Bud Clark, who Portland Monthly described as a "strong straight ally of the gay community", held campaign events at the bar, and celebrated his victory there after being elected mayor in 1984.

Portland musician Greg Sage had a studio called 421 Sound in the section of the building ultimately occupied by the Crack Press. Among other recordings, Sage recorded three records by his band Wipers in the building: Land of the Lost (1986), Follow Blind (1987), and The Circle (1988).

In September 1999, the Portland Development Commission (PDC) purchased the property as part of a plan to redevelop the entire block on which the building stood. In 2002, PDC earmarked $2 million for the Blanchet House of Hospitality, a homeless shelter neighboring the Dirty Duck, to construct a new facility at a different location. In return, Blanchet House would deed its property, at the intersection of Northwest Fourth Avenue and Glisan Street, to the commission. However, these plans changed, and before the "land swap" deal was finalized in 2008, parties agreed that Blanchet House would receive $2 million, acquire the Dirty Duck property, and build a new facility on the same block. Demolition and construction of the new facility was estimated to cost $9–10 million.

In November 2008, PDC described the building as "functionally and physically obsolete", and in need of a major investment "to extend its useful life". In August 2009, members of the city's Historic Landmarks Commission (HLC) criticized plans to demolish the Dirty Duck. The commission held a demolition review in January 2010; their feedback was sent to the Portland Bureau of Development Services, who then submitted a recommendation to Portland City Council, who would ultimately decide the building's fate. In February 2010, Portland City Council approved the building's demolition by a four-to-one vote, despite HLC's recommendation for its preservation.

=== Gail's Dirty Duck Tavern ===
The building housed the gay bar Gail's Dirty Duck Tavern. "Mama Bernice", or simply "Mama", purchased the bar in 1984. According to her son, who acquired the bar following her death in 1986, she wanted to socialize with the railroaders and seamen, whom she referred to as "bluebirds", and who were already patrons of the establishment. She insisted that the bar retain its name and clientele. "Mama" helped establish the Oregon Bears in 1995, which began with 13 members and has since grown to more than 300, becoming one of the largest bear groups in the United States. The bar was the "official" home of the Oregon Bears until 2007, when they voted to move to Eagle Portland because of its larger size and greater number of services.

In 2007, Willamette Week's Byron Beck described Dirty Duck as the "quirkiest queer tavern in town" and a "homebase hole-in-the-wall for a group of gay men with beer guts and bushy brows". Blackout Leather Productions, a nonprofit organization and volunteer group of leather enthusiasts in Oregon and southwest Washington, recognized Dirty Duck Tavern as the "Business of the Year" in 2004 and 2008, at their annual Rose & Thorn Awards.

The bar closed on August 23, 2009, after operating for 25 years.

== See also ==
- National Register of Historic Places listings in Northwest Portland, Oregon
