= Mi Media Naranja =

Studio album by Labradford
- Released: October 13, 1997
- Studio: Sound of Music Recording Studios (Richmond, Virginia)
- Genre: Post-rock
- Length: 43:13
- Label: Blast First; Kranky
- Producer: Claire Lewis

Labradford chronology
Labradford (1996)	Mi Media Naranja (1997)	E Luxo So (1999)

Professional ratings
Review scores
Source	Rating
AllMusic	4.5/5 stars
NME	8/10
Pitchfork	8.9/10

Mi Media Naranja ("My Other Half" in Spanish) is the fourth studio album by American post-rock band Labradford. It was released on October 13, 1997 by Blast First and on November 19, 1997 by Kranky.

In 2016, Fact placed Mi Media Naranja at number eight on its list of the best post-rock albums of all time.

== Track listing ==
All tracks are written by Carter Brown, Robert Donne and Mark Nelson.

No.	Title	Length
1.	"S"	6:19
2.	"G"	4:00
3.	"WR"	5:50
4.	"C"	6:23
5.	"I"	4:59
6.	"V"	6:24
7.	"P"	9:18

== Personnel ==
Adapted from the Mi Media Naranja liner notes.

=== Labradford ===
- Carter Brown – keyboards
- Robert Donne – bass guitar
- Mark Nelson – vocals, guitar

=== Additional musicians ===
- Chris Johnston – violin
- Ulysses Kirksey – violin

=== Production and design ===
- Labradford – recording, mixing
- Claire Lewis – production
- John Morand – recording, mixing
- N. Terry – cover art

== Release history ==
Region	Date	Label	Format	Catalog
United States	1997	Kranky	CD, LP	krank 023
United Kingdom	1997	Blast First	CD, LP	BFFP 144
