= Alien Boy: The Life and Death of James Chasse =

- Theatrical release poster
- Directed by: Brian Lindstrom
- Produced by: Jason Renaud; Brian Lindstrom; Andrew Saunderson
- Cinematography: John Campbell
- Edited by: Andrew Saunderson
- Production company: Mental Health Association of Portland
- Distributed by: Breaking Glass Pictures
- Release date: February 15, 2013 (Portland International Film Festival)
- Running time: 90 minutes
- Country: United States
- Language: English

Alien Boy: The Life and Death of James Chasse is an American feature-length documentary film, released in 2013 and directed by Brian Lindstrom. The film explores issues of police accountability in the case of James Chasse, a man with schizophrenia who was killed by Portland, Oregon, police officers in 2006. The title refers to a song about him, "Alien Boy" by the Wipers.

In Family of James Chasse v City of Portland, Judge Garr King added the film to the case gag order and was asked by Portland city attorneys for a change of venue based on teasers for Alien Boy. The case was settled in 2011 for $1.6 million and instigated an investigation by the Department of Justice which found the Portland Police Bureau "engages in a pattern or practice of excessive force" against persons with mental illness. Prior settlements in 2009 included $925,000 from Multnomah County and a reported $600,000 from American Medical Rescue. Members of Portland City Council agreed with DOJ findings in a settlement signed in November 2012.

The film was produced by the Mental Health Association of Portland, a nonprofit advocacy organization and distributed by Breaking Glass Pictures.

Alien Boy: the Life and Death of James Chasse premiered at the Portland International Film Festival in February 2013. It is an official selection of the 2013 Big Sky Documentary Film Festival, Minneapolis–Saint Paul International Film Festival, Cinema Pacific Film Festival (Eugene, Oregon), Astoria International Film Festival, Local Sightings Film Festival (Seattle), and Rendezvous With Madness (Toronto).

The film was reviewed in a number of publications, including the Seattle Weekly, The Seattle Times, and The Stranger. Rotten Tomatoes rates the film 87%.
