= Follow Blind =

Studio album by Wipers
- Released: 1987
- Genre: Punk rock
- Length: 33:28
- Label: Restless
- Producer: Greg Sage

Wipers chronology
| Land of the Lost (1986) | Follow Blind (1987) | The Circle (1988) |

Professional ratings
Review scores
| Source | Rating |
|---|---|
| AllMusic | 2/5 stars |
| MusicHound Rock | 4/5 stars |

Follow Blind is the fifth studio album by punk rock band Wipers, released in 1987 by Restless Records. It was recorded at 421 Sound, in Portland, Oregon.

== Track listing ==
All songs written by Greg Sage.

1. "Follow Blind" – 3:37
2. "Someplace Else" – 2:51
3. "Any Time You Find" – 4:28
4. "The Chill Remains" – 3:30
5. "Let It Slide" – 2:32
6. "Against the Wall" – 3:07
7. "No Doubt About It" – 2:31
8. "Don't Belong to You" – 2:26
9. "Losers Town" – 3:00
10. "Coming Down" – 2:12
11. "Next Time" – 3:14

== Personnel ==
- Greg Sage – vocals, guitar, harp; producer. Recorded by Greg Sage.
- Brad Davidson – bass guitar
- Steve Plouf – drums
- David Wilds – Photography
