= The Circle (Wipers album) =

Studio album by Wipers
- Released: 1988
- Genre: Post-punk
- Length: 32:49
- Label: Restless
- Producer: Greg Sage

Wipers chronology
Follow Blind (1987)	The Circle (1988)	Silver Sail (1993)

The Circle is a studio album by the American band Wipers, released on Restless in 1988. The album was recorded at frontman Greg Sage's studio, 421 Sound, in Portland, Oregon.

== Critical reception ==
Professional ratings
Review scores
Source	Rating
The Encyclopedia of Popular Music	3/5 stars
The Great Alternative & Indie Discography	6/10
MusicHound Rock: The Essential Album Guide	4/5 stars
Spin Alternative Record Guide	6/10

Trouser Press wrote that "The Circle‘s scorching opener, 'I Want a Way', and its tumultuous title track are red herrings for Wipers' business as usual." The Boston Globe determined that Greg Sage is "less the master of that massive tension/release valve, and more the prisoner of straight-out, churning, semi-preachy post-punk."

The Rough Guide to Rock wrote that "jazzy distorted riffing hadn't sounded this invigorating since Hendrix or Robert Fripp had their heyday."

== Track listing ==
All songs written by Greg Sage.

1. "I Want a Way" - 2:35
2. "Time Marches On" - 2:50
3. "All the Same" - 3:36
4. "True Believer" - 3:54
5. "Good Thing" - 2:28
6. "Make or Break" - 3:40
7. "The Circle" - 4:33
8. "Goodbye Again" - 3:19
9. "Be There" - 2:48
10. "Blue & Red" - 3:06

== Personnel ==
- Greg Sage – vocals, guitar, harp; producer
- Brad Davidson – bass guitar
- Steve Plouf – drums
