= Labradford =

American post-rock band

- Origin: Richmond, Virginia, U.S.
- Genres: Post-rock; ambient; space rock revival; slowcore; kosmische
- Years active: 1992–2001
- Labels: Kranky, Blast First
- Members: Carter Brown; Robert Donne; Mark Nelson
- Website: Brainwashed.com/labradford

Labradford is an American post-rock group founded in 1992 in Richmond, Virginia. They have released six full albums from 1993 to 2001. Though not disbanded, they have been on hiatus while members have been active with separate projects, including Mark Nelson's project Pan American.

== Biography ==
Founded in 1991, Labradford consists of bassist Robert Donne, guitarist and vocalist Mark Nelson, and keyboardist Carter Brown. Their music style is experimental ambient post-rock, although their first releases were much more related to dark drone rock.

After a début single in 1992, they were signed by Kranky who issued their début album Prazision LP in 1993. In 1999, they commenced their Festival of Drifting series, which featured appearances from Pole, Robin Guthrie, Matmos, Papa M, and Sigur Rós. They also toured during the same period of time with Godspeed You! Black Emperor.

Though the group has not officially disbanded, they have not released music since Fixed::Context in 2001. Following its release, the band members separately moved out of Richmond. Donne collaborated with Adam Wiltzie of Stars of the Lid in the project Aix Em Klemm, in addition to joining the groups Spokane and Gregor Samsa, while Nelson has recorded on Kranky under the name Pan American since 1998.

== Discography ==
=== Full albums ===
- 1993: Prazision LP
- 1995: A Stable Reference
- 1996: Labradford
- 1997: Mi Media Naranja
- 1999: E Luxo So
- 2001: Fixed::Context

=== Other releases ===
- 1992: "Everlast", U.S. 7", Retro 8 (now collected on Prazision LP: A-side since the 1993 CD, B-side since its 2007 remaster)
- 1995: "Julius", U.S. 7", Merge
- 1996: "Scenic Recovery", UK 10", Duophonic
- 1996: The Kahanek Incident, Vol. 3, U.S. 12" (split with Stars of the Lid), Trance Syndicate
- 2000: Ene, 10" LP split with Surfers of Romantica, Eerie Materials

=== Compilation appearances ===
- 1992: Repugnating The Wombat US CS Retro 8
- 1994: Dixie Flatline (Wilson Interrupt Mix), Skyliner (live) US CD Radioactive Rat
- 1994: Ambient 4: Isolationism Air Lubricated Free Axis Trainer UK 2CD Virgin AMBT 4
- 1994: The Church Song (remix of a Jim O'Rourke track) US CD Astralwerks ASW6153
- 1995: Excursions In Ambience IV: The Fourth Frontier
- 1996: Newman Passage, Pico / Elec. Security UK CD Blast First bffp141cde
- 1996: Volume 16, The Window UK CD Volume 16 VCD16
- 1996: Monsters, Rugrats and Bugmen, Sedr 77 UK 2CD Virgin ambt111
- 1998: The Wire Tapper 2 [given away free with The Wire issue 177, November 1998] V (Harold Budd Remix) UK CD WIRECD002
- 1999: Drifing A.F.U. [limited edition CD given away free at Labradford's Second Festival of Drifting, 1999]
- 2000: The Wire Tapper 5 [given away free with The Wire issue 193, March 2000] So Remix (Matmos Remix), UK CD WIRECD005
- 2016: By Chris Johnston, Craig Markva, Jamie Evans (Original Version), The Young Pope Soundtrack, WB CD 5054197508028

== See also ==
- Coil, friends of Labradford who intended to collaborate
- The first wave of post-rock
