= Now (EP) =

EP by Band of Susans
- Released: 1992
- Recorded: August 1992
- Studio: Baby Monster Studio (New York City, NY)
- Genre: Noise rock, alternative rock
- Length: 26:14
- Label: Restless
- Producer: Robert Poss

Band of Susans chronology
The Peel Sessions (1992)	Now (1992)	Veil (1993)

Professional ratings
Review scores
Source	Rating
Allmusic	2/5 stars

Now is an EP by Band of Susans, released in 1992 by Restless Records.

== Track listing ==
All tracks are written by Robert Poss and Susan Stenger, except "Paint It Black" by Mick Jagger and Keith Richards.

No.	Title	Length
1.	"Pearls of Wisdom"	4:01
2.	"Following My Heart"	4:30
3.	"Trash Train"	3:58
4.	"Paint It Black"	4:21
5.	"Now Is Now" (Remix)	4:54
6.	"Paint It Black" (Instrumental version)	4:30

== Personnel ==
Adapted from Now liner notes.

Band of Susans

- Anne Husick – electric guitar
- Mark Lonergan – electric guitar
- Robert Poss – electric guitar, vocals, production
- Ron Spitzer – drums
- Susan Stenger – bass guitar, vocals

Production and additional personnel

- Pat Dillon – art direction
- Bryce Goggin – engineering
- Chris Lewis – assistant engineer
- David Perry – photography

== Release history ==
Region	Date	Label	Format	Catalog
United States	1992	Restless	CD	7 72722
Germany	1992	Rough Trade	CD	RTD 159.1491
