= The Herd (Wipers album) =

Studio album by Wipers
- Released: February 20, 1996
- Recorded: Zeno, Phoenix, Arizona
- Genre: Punk rock
- Length: 42:40
- Label: Tim/Kerr
- Producer: Greg Sage

Wipers chronology
Silver Sail (1993)	The Herd (1996)	Power in One (1999)

Professional ratings
Review scores
Source	Rating
AllMusic	4.5/5 stars
Alternative Press	5/5 stars
The Boston Phoenix	3/4 stars
In Music We Trust	B−
MusicHound Rock	4.5/5 stars

The Herd is the eighth studio album by punk rock band Wipers, released in 1996 by the label Tim/Kerr. The album was written, produced and recorded by Sage at his own Zeno Studios in Phoenix, Arizona.

== Track listing ==
All songs written by Greg Sage.

1. "Psychic Vampire" – 3:42
2. "No Place Safe" – 4:02
3. "Last Chance" – 3:25
4. "Wind the Clock Slowly" – 3:28
5. "The Herd" – 4:01
6. "Stormy" – 3:14
7. "Green Light Legion" – 3:14
8. "Sinking as a Stone" – 4:08
9. "Sunrise" – 3:17
10. "Defiant" – 3:38
11. "Resist" – 3:28
12. "Insane" – 3:03

== Personnel ==
Adapted from the liner notes:

- Greg Sage: vocals, guitar, production, recording
- Steve Plouf: drums
- Galen Showman: artwork
- Steven Birch: layout
