= Blessing and Curse =

EP by Band of Susans
- Released: 1987
- Recorded: August 1986
- Studio: Calliope Productions (New York City, NY)
- Genre: Noise rock, alternative rock
- Length: 17:13
- Label: Trace Elements
- Producer: Robert Poss

Band of Susans chronology
Blessing and Curse (1987)	Hope Against Hope (1988)

Professional ratings
Review scores
Source	Rating
Allmusic	2/5 stars

Blessing and Curse is an EP by Band of Susans, released in 1987 by Trace Elements Records.

== Track listing ==
All tracks are written by Robert Poss and Susan Stenger.

Side one
No.	Title	Length
1.	"Hope Against Hope"	4:59
2.	"You Were an Optimist"	3:20

Side two
No.	Title	Length
1.	"Sometimes"	3:53
2.	"Where Have All the Flowers Gone"	5:01

== Personnel ==
Adapted from Blessing and Curse liner notes.

Band of Susans

- Susan Lyall – electric guitar, backing vocals
- Robert Poss – electric guitar, vocals, production
- Alva Rogers – vocals
- Ron Spitzer – drums
- Susan Stenger – bass guitar, backing vocals
- Susan Tallman – electric guitar

Production and additional personnel

- Bob Coulter – engineering
- Bill Hemy – engineering
- Bob Power – engineering

== Release history ==
Region	Date	Label	Format	Catalog
United States	1987	Trace Elements	LP	7 72722
Germany	1987	Furthur	LP	RTD 159.1491
