= Alien Boy =

EP by Wipers
- Released: 1980
- Recorded: 1979
- Genre: Punk rock
- Length: 8:54
- Label: Park Avenue
- Producer: Greg Sage

Wipers chronology
Is This Real? (1980)	Alien Boy (1980)	Youth of America (1981)

Wipers singles chronology
Better Off Dead (1979)	Alien Boy (1980)	Romeo (1981)

"Alien Boy" is the seventh song on the first Wipers album, Is This Real? (Park Avenue Records), released in 1980.

Alien Boy is also the title of a 1980 Wipers EP, with "Alien Boy" on side A, and three outtakes from the Is This Real? album sessions on side B. In 1993, the tracks were added to the Sub Pop reissue of the album Is This Real?.

The Alien Boy EP cover art featured on the back of the Sub Pop version of Is This Real? was not the original; instead, Sub Pop used the cover art of the German version of the Alien Boy EP, released in 1987 on the label Weird System, a special limited edition of 2,000 numbered copies on green vinyl.

According to frontman Greg Sage's statement on the Zeno Records website, James Chasse, also called "Jim Jim", was the subject of "Alien Boy". Sage noted, "Jim Jim's conversations with me and his powerful sense of vision painted uncanny, powerful visions in my head that became a huge influence for a few songs that were later recorded for the Is This Real? LP." Chasse died after being arrested by police officers in Portland, Oregon in September 2006. He is the subject of the documentary film Alien Boy: The Life and Death of James Chasse.

== Track listing ==
1. "Alien Boy" – 3:28
2. "Image of Man" – 2:31
3. "Telepathic Love" – 1:32
4. "Voices in the Rain" – 1:23
