= Sacrifice (For Love) =

Studio album by Greg Sage
- Released: August 9, 1991
- Recorded: 1991
- Genre: Indie rock
- Length: 35:45
- Label: Restless
- Producer: Greg Sage

Greg Sage chronology
Best of the Wipers and Greg Sage (1991)	Sacrifice (For Love) (1991)	Electric Medicine (2001)

Professional ratings
Review scores
Source	Rating
AllMusic	2/5 stars
MusicHound Rock	4/5 stars

Sacrifice (For Love) is the second solo release of Wipers frontman Greg Sage. It was recorded and released in 1991. It contains a cover of the Yardbirds' "For Your Love".

== Track listing ==
All tracks composed by Greg Sage unless otherwise noted.

1. "Stay by Me"
2. "Sacrifice (For Love)"
3. "Know by Now"
4. "Forever"
5. "The Same Game"
6. "No Turning Back"
7. "Ready or Not"
8. "For Your Love" (Graham Gouldman)
9. "This Planet Earth"
10. "Dreams"
