= Silver Sail =

Studio album by Wipers
- Released: 1993
- Recorded: Zeno, Phoenix, Arizona
- Genre: Punk rock
- Length: 38:26
- Label: Tim/Kerr
- Producer: Greg Sage

Wipers chronology
The Circle (1988)	Silver Sail (1993)	The Herd (1996)

Silver Sail is the seventh studio album by punk rock band Wipers, released in 1993. After disbanding Wipers in 1989 and releasing a 1991 solo album, Sacrifice (For Love), Sage decided to release a new album under the Wipers name.

== Production ==
The album was written, produced and recorded by Sage at his Zeno Studios in Phoenix, Arizona. Steve Plouf returned to play drums.

== Critical reception ==
Professional ratings
Review scores
Source	Rating
AllMusic	4/5 stars
The Encyclopedia of Popular Music	3/5 stars
The Great Alternative & Indie Discography	6/10
MusicHound Rock: The Essential Album Guide	4/5 stars
Select	3/5 medals
Spin Alternative Record Guide	4/10

Trouser Press wrote: "A more deliberate pace allows Sage’s virtuoso playing extra opportunity to bob and weave, float and tickle, tease and torment; he introduces hints of quiet surf music, spaghetti westerns and other lonely, timeless sounds." The Rough Guide to Rock deemed the album "a return to The Circle's jazzy style of neo-psychedelic thrash." Rolling Stone wrote that Sage emphasizes "deep-pool echo and a punky, rainy-day melancholy that gives new meaning to the term power ballad."

== Track listing ==
All songs written by Greg Sage.

1. "Y I Came" - 2:40
2. "Back to the Basics" - 3:39
3. "Warning" - 4:05
4. "Mars" - 2:35
5. "Prisoner" - 5:56
6. "Standing There" - 3:13
7. "Sign of the Times" - 3:16
8. "Line" - 3:15
9. "On a Roll" - 3:22
10. "Never Win" - 2:16
11. "Silver Sail" - 4:05
