= Band of Susans =

American alternative rock band

- Susans performing in 1987

Background information
- Origin: New York City, U.S.
- Genres: Noise rock; alternative rock
- Years active: 1986–1996
- Labels: Restless; Blast First/Enigma; Trace Elements
- Members: Robert Poss; Ron Spitzer; Susan Stenger
- Past members: Alva Rogers; Susan Lyall; Susan Tallman; Page Hamilton; Karen Haglof; Mark Lonergan; Anne Husick; Jay Braun; Kelly Burns
- Website: www.robertposs.com/band-of-susans

Band of Susans was an American alternative rock No Wave band formed in New York City in 1986 and active until 1996. It originally consisted of Robert Poss (guitar/vocals), Susan Stenger (bass/vocals), Ron Spitzer (drums), with Susan Lyall (guitar), Susan Tallman (guitar), and Alva Rogers (vocals). The band would undergo several permutations over the years, usually involving three guitarists. Poss, Stenger, and Spitzer were the band's core members throughout its duration. They originated in the New York No Wave noise rock scene, but due to their layered guitar sound were sometimes seen as the American counterparts to the UK shoegazing bands. Like Sonic Youth, they drew influence from noise music experimental composers for the electric guitar Rhys Chatham and Glenn Branca.

== History ==
In the early to mid-1980s, Poss studied under the tutelage of avant-garde guitar ensemble composer Rhys Chatham, and played in the bands Tot Rocket and Western Eyes. The band was formed by avant-garde flautist Susan Stenger and guitarist Robert Poss, they took their name from the trio of Susans then in the lineup. Poss, Stenger, and Spitzer grew up together in Buffalo, New York.

Band of Susans released the 12" EP Blessing And Curse on Poss's own Trace Elements label. A record-release party (also said to be the band's first-ever live gig) was held at NYC's The Love Club on January 31, 1987; BoS were the opening act for a band called Das Furlines. They were soon signed to the avant-garde Blast First imprint of UK record label Mute Records.

After the release of début album Hope Against Hope, Rogers, Lyall and Tallman quit, and were replaced by Karen Haglof (guitar) and Page Hamilton (guitar). This lineup recorded the album Love Agenda and a Peel Sessions EP, which featured a cover of Gang Of Four's "I Found That Essence Rare". The two new guitarists then quit, with Hamilton quickly forming the more metal-influenced Helmet. Anne Husick (guitar) and Mark Lonergan (guitar) then joined BoS, yielding the band's "classic lineup" which made three more albums, including The Word and the Flesh and one EP, all on Restless Records.

According to The Great Indie Discography compilation, "...unfortunately, success is the one thing that has eluded the Band of Susans and Co. throughout their decade-plus lifespan."

== Musical style ==
Band of Susans was a "rock band without the rock clichés ... each instrument was given its own part, and they fitted together like building blocks to create droning, dense textures." As their history of having eight guitarists in all (and never less than three at any given time) attests, Band of Susans were a heavily guitar-centric outfit. They are generally included in New York City's abrasive post-no wave scene which produced Sonic Youth, Glenn Branca, Live Skull, and Swans. They generally used G&L brand guitars (which appear on several of the band's album covers), Fender Jazzmasters, and Park (a budget brand made by Marshall) amplifiers. G&L owner Leo Fender was a fan of the band and later befriended Poss.

Musically, the band organised their three guitarists into providing an overwhelming wall of feedback and guitar noise layered atop more conventional song structures. Due to their focus on atmospheric textures, the band is often considered a peripheral member of the shoegaze movement, though they had a more abrasive sound closer to that of their New York contemporaries than most of the primarily-British bands of the shoegaze genre. Like shoegaze bands such as My Bloody Valentine, Band of Susans were notorious for playing live at extremely high volumes in order to recreate the visceral impact of their studio albums. In an interview, guitarist Robert Poss noted the similarity between shoegaze and Band of Susan's hypnotic soundscape, saying "My Bloody Valentine have been contemporaries of ours, and we played shows with them in Europe and in the U.S. in 1989." Despite the band's experimental leanings, Poss was a big fan of The Rolling Stones, which would later manifest in covers of the Stones' songs "Child of the Moon" and "Paint It, Black".

== Live performances ==
Band of Susans toured the U.S. and Europe sporadically. They played with bands such as Live Skull, My Bloody Valentine, Butthole Surfers, Wire, Rollins Band, Smegma, Das Furlines, and Lovely. During the band's final U.S. and European tours, Jay Braun (who formed the Negatones shortly thereafter) filled in for Lonergan and Kelly Burns filled in for Ron Spitzer. Band of Susans also performed, with Rhys Chatham as a warmup "group", at "The Kitchen" on 19th Street, in the early 1980s as part of a "performance art" piece. Afterward, they performed at CBGB, although not with their original lineup, with the exception of Susan Stenger, Robert Poss, and possibly Karen Hagloff.

== Post-breakup ==
After the dissolution of the band in late 1996, Poss and Stenger performed with Bruce Gilbert of Wire as gilbertpossstenger; one album was released under this moniker. Stenger and Poss have also worked extensively with composer Phill Niblock. Poss has concentrated on production and solo work. Poss and Stenger played live with Siouxsie Sioux's second band the Creatures in May 1998, playing on a tv session Later with Jools Holland. Stenger also went on tour in the US with Siouxsie and the Creatures, and also played for John Cale each night on this double bill tour. and worked with Nick Cave and Alan Vega (Suicide) among others. She has an electric bass ensemble, Big Bottom, and has collaborated with choreographer Michael Clark, author Iain Sinclair and visual artist Cerith Wyn Evans. Her 96-day musical installation, Soundtrack for an Exhibition, opened at Le Musée d'Art Contemporain in Lyon, France on March 7, 2006, and includes contributions from Robert Poss, Alan Vega, Alexander Hacke, Kim Gordon, Mika Vainio, Ulrich Krieger, and Jenny Hoyston among others.

Poss released a pair of solo albums, Distortion Is Truth and Crossing Casco Bay in 2002, has created music for choreographers Alexandra Beller, Sally Gross and Gerald Casel, and has engineered CDs by Seth Josel and Phill Niblock; he has also worked in collaboration with Ben Neill and David Dramm. In April 2009 he performed as part of Rhys Chatham's ensemble at the Metropolitan Museum of Art in conjunction with the exhibit "Downtown Comes Uptown: The Pictures Generation, 1974–1984".

== Music videos ==
Music videos were released for:

- "The Pursuit of Happiness" (1989)
- "Now Is Now" (1991)
- "Blind" (1993)
- "The Last Temptation of Susan" (1993) (experimental video collage by Leah Singer)

== Discography ==
Studio albums

- Hope Against Hope (1988)
- Love Agenda (1989)
- The Word and the Flesh (1991)
- Veil (1993)
- Here Comes Success (1995)

Extended plays

- Blessing and Curse (1987)
- The Peel Sessions (1992)
- Now (1992)

Compilation albums

- Wired for Sound (1995)
