= Power in One =

Studio album by Wipers
- Released: October 22, 1999
- Recorded: Zeno, Phoenix, Arizona
- Genre: Punk rock
- Length: 46:33
- Label: Zeno
- Producer: Greg Sage

Wipers chronology
The Herd (1996)	Power in One (1999)

Power in One is the final studio album by punk rock band Wipers, released in 1999 by Zeno Records. The album was written, produced and recorded at Greg Sage's Zeno Studios in Phoenix, Arizona.

== Critical reception ==
Professional ratings
Review scores
Source	Rating
AllMusic	4/5 stars
Lincoln Journal Star	4.5/5 stars

Exclaim! wrote that "led by Sage's sinewy lead guitar riffs, the band plays in a gothic-tinged post-punk style that is timeless." The Arizona Republic wrote that "Sage retains his guitar soloing ego on Power in One but he's tempering his songwriting with aging post-punk anxiety."

== Track listing ==
All songs written by Greg Sage.

1. "The Fall" – 3:46
2. "Power in One" – 3:36
3. "Shaken" – 3:41
4. "Misleading" – 3:37
5. "Rocket" – 3:08
6. "I'll Be Around" – 2:18
7. "Still Inside of Me" – 3:33
8. "Ship of Dreams" – 3:20
9. "Rest of My Life" – 3:42
10. "Loser's Revenge" – 2:54
11. "Take It Now" – 2:52
12. "Stay Around" – 4:22
13. "What's Wrong?" – 3:54
14. "Too Many Strangers" – 1:41

== Personnel ==
- Greg Sage – vocals, guitar, bass; producer.
- Steve Plouf – drums
