= A Stable Reference =

Studio album by Labradford
- Released: May 23, 1995
- Studio: The American University (Washington, D.C.)
- Genre: Post-rock
- Length: 46:05
- Label: Kranky

Labradford chronology
Prazision LP (1993)	A Stable Reference (1995)	Labradford (1996)

A Stable Reference is the second studio album by American post-rock band Labradford, released on May 23, 1995 by Kranky.

== Reception ==
Professional ratings
Review scores
Source	Rating
AllMusic	4/5 stars

Reviewing A Stable Reference for AllMusic, Ned Raggett stated, "The biggest change on Reference has remained a near-constant ever since, namely, the removal of lyrics and vocal parts from almost all tracks, outside of some extremely understated and intentionally buried in-the-mix-bits scattered throughout the record." He also noted a greater focus on "mix complexity, with subtle yet important sonic elements and samples scattered throughout the songs", concluding that "in the end, Reference already points to the increasingly more challenging albums in Labradford's near future." Deborah Sprague of Trouser Press wrote that the band's "penchant for psychic drift still exists... but Labradford's paths seem a little more clear-cut the second time around".

== Track listing ==
All tracks are written by Carter Brown, Robert Donne and Mark Nelson

No.	Title	Length
1.	"Mas"	4:32
2.	"El Lago"	5:29
3.	"Streamlining"	4:44
4.	"Banco"	5:03
5.	"Eero"	6:50
6.	"Balanced on Its Own Flame"	4:02
7.	"Star City, Russia"	5:03
8.	"Comfort"	6:14
9.	"SEDR 77"	4:07

== Personnel ==
Adapted from the A Stable Reference liner notes.

Labradford

- Carter Brown – keyboards
- Robert Donne – bass guitar
- Mark Nelson – vocals, guitar

Production and additional personnel

- Rob Christiansen – recording, mixing

== Release history ==
Region	Date	Label	Format	Catalog
United States	1995	Kranky	CD, LP	krank 006
United Kingdom	1995	Flying Nun	CD, LP	FN 329
