= Prazision LP =

Studio album by Labradford
- Released: October 1993
- Studios: McKinley Hall (Richmond, Virginia); Belt Trade Center (Richmond, Virginia)
- Genres: Post-rock; ambient; drone
- Length: 65:48
- Label: Kranky

Labradford chronology
Prazision LP (1993)	A Stable Reference (1995)

Prazision LP is the debut studio album by American post-rock band Labradford. It was released in October 1993 by Kranky, serving as the label's first album release. It was re-released by Kranky on November 12, 2007, with an additional track taken from the band's first single.

== Critical reception ==
Professional ratings
Review scores
Source	Rating
AllMusic	4/5 stars
NME	8/10

The Chicago Tribune wrote: "With its outdated synthesizers creating vaporous pools of dread and beauty, narcotized vocals ... and distant guitars plucking out vague, melancholy melodies, Labradford's Prazision LP ... is trance rock at its finest."

== Track listing ==
All lyrics are written by Mark Nelson; all music is composed by Labradford.

No.	Title	Length
1.	"Listening in Depth"	7:33
2.	"Accelerating on a Smoother Road"	4:14
3.	"Splash Down"	6:39
4.	"Disremembering"	3:41
5.	"Experience the Gated Oscillator"	7:18
6.	"Soft Return"	3:24
7.	"Sliding Glass"	6:19
8.	"C. of People"	4:54
9.	"New Listening"	5:03
10.	"Gratitude"	2:24
11.	"Skyward with Motion"	8:43
12.	"Everlast"	5:36

2007 remastered CD bonus track
No.	Title	Length
13.	"Preserve the Sound Outside"	3:07

== Personnel ==
Adapted from the Prazision LP liner notes.

Labradford

- Carter Brown – Memorymoog, Polymoog, Korg Polysix, Roland Vocoder Plus, Moog Taurus II bass pedals
- Mark Nelson – vocals, Ovation Preacher twelve-string guitar, Yamaha six-string, Epiphone Genesis, tape

Production and additional personnel

- Rob Christiansen – recording (1–11)
- Shawn Collins – recording (12)

== Release history ==
Region	Date	Label	Format	Catalog
United States	1993	Kranky	CD, LP	krank 001
United Kingdom	1995	Flying Nun	CD, LP	FN 342
United States	2007	Kranky	CD	krank 001
