= A Blessing and a Curse =

Studio album by Drive-By Truckers
- Released: April 18, 2006
- Studio: Fidelitorium, Kernersville, North Carolina
- Length: 46:54
- Label: New West
- Producer: David Barbe

Drive-By Truckers chronology
The Dirty South (2004)	A Blessing and a Curse (2006)	Brighter Than Creation's Dark (2008)

Professional ratings
Aggregate scores
Source	Rating
Metacritic	78/100
Review scores
Source	Rating
AllMusic	3.5/5 stars
Blender	4/5 stars
Entertainment Weekly	A−
The Irish Times	4/5 stars
Mojo	4/5 stars
NME	5/10
Pitchfork	7.0/10
Rolling Stone	3.5/5 stars
Spin	B
Uncut	4/5 stars

A Blessing and a Curse is the sixth studio album by American rock band Drive-By Truckers, released in 2006. It peaked at No. 50 on the Billboard 200, which was the highest charting for the band until 2008's follow up, Brighter Than Creation's Dark, which hit No. 37.

== Background ==
A Blessing and a Curse is regarded as the Drive-by Truckers' most controversial and polarizing album by both the band and fans. This is the last album to feature Jason Isbell on guitar as he left the band in spring of 2007. A Blessing and a Curse is a departure from Drive-By Truckers' previous sound, exhibiting less of a 'southern-rock' chemistry and taking on a more classic rock edge than any of their previous records. Approximately half of the songs were recorded within hours of them being written.

Guitarist Patterson Hood has explained that A Blessing and A Curse was made at a rather difficult point in the band's history. He explains that the band was "trying to find common ground at a time when it was a little hard to come by." Hood also says in his online commentary of the album that he prefers the second side of the album over the first. "A World of Hurt" is Hood's second favorite song he has written (his favorite being Gangstabilly's "The Living Bubba"). The title of Barr Weissman's documentary of the Drive-By Truckers, "The Secret To A Happy Ending," is taken from a line from "A World of Hurt."

== Track listing ==
No.	Title	Writer(s)	Length
1.	"Feb 14"	Hood	3:40
2.	"Gravity's Gone"	Cooley	3:33
3.	"Easy on Yourself"	Isbell	3:28
4.	"Aftermath USA"	Hood	3:16
5.	"Goodbye"	Hood	6:11
6.	"Daylight"	Isbell	3:35
7.	"Wednesday"	Hood	4:04
8.	"Little Bonnie"	Hood	3:56
9.	"Space City"	Cooley	4:48
10.	"A Blessing and a Curse"	Hood	5:31
11.	"A World of Hurt"	Hood	4:51

== Personnel ==
- Mike Cooley – guitar, vocals
- Patterson Hood – guitar, vocals
- Jason Isbell – guitar, vocals
- Brad Morgan – drums
- Shonna Tucker – bass

== Chart performance ==
Chart	Provider(s)	Peak position	Certification	Sales/ shipments
Billboard 200 (U.S.)	Billboard	50	Not certified	N/A
Billboard Top Independent Albums (U.S.)	Billboard	3	Not certified	N/A
