= Eight Songs for Greg Sage and the Wipers =

Eight Songs for Greg Sage and The Wipers

Studio album by Various Artists
- Released: 1992
- Genre: Punk rock
- Label: Tim/Kerr
- Producer: Slayer Hippy

Eight Songs for Greg Sage and the Wipers is a Wipers tribute album released on Tim/Kerr in 1992. The album was first released as a box set of 4 colored 7-inch records in a run of 10,000. It helped to raise the profile of the independent label.

Nirvana recorded their cover of "Return of the Rat" after Geffen had reservations about including the band's cover of "D-7". Hole recorded a cover of "Over the Edge".

Fourteen Songs for Greg Sage and the Wipers is the CD re-release of the album, expanded to include additional artist covers.

== Critical reception ==
Professional ratings
Review scores
Source	Rating
AllMusic	2.5/5 stars

Phoenix New Times praised "Up Front", calling it a "killer cut ... and a real firebomb of pure punk." Vulture listed "Return of the Rat" as Nirvana's 55th best song (out of 72), writing: "Furious and loose, this is an incredibly faithful take on Sage’s version with just a little bit of its desperate, quivering edge lost in the process."

== Track listings ==
Original eight song track listing

1. "Potential Suicide" (Napalm Beach)
2. "Astro Cloud" (M99)
3. "Return of the Rat" (Nirvana)
4. "Up Front" (Poison Idea)
5. "On the Run" (Dharma Bums)
6. "I Don't Know What I Am/Mystery" (Crackerbash)
7. "Over the Edge" (Hole)
8. "Land of the Lost" (Whirlees)

Fourteen song re-release

1. "Potential Suicide" (Napalm Beach)
2. "Astro Cloud" (M99)
3. "Return of the Rat" (Nirvana)
4. "Up Front" (Poison Idea)
5. "On the Run" (Dharma Bums)
6. "I Don't Know What I Am/Mystery" (Crackerbash)
7. "Over the Edge" (Hole)
8. "Land of the Lost" (Whirlees)
9. "Telepathic Love" (Nation of Ulysses)
10. "No One Wants an Alien" (Honey)
11. "Tragedy" (Hazel)
12. "Alien Boy" (Calamity Jane)
13. "Soul's Tongue" (Saliva Tree)
14. "Pushing the Extreme" (Thurston Moore and Keith Nealy)
