= Brian Lindstrom =

American filmmaker (1961–2026)

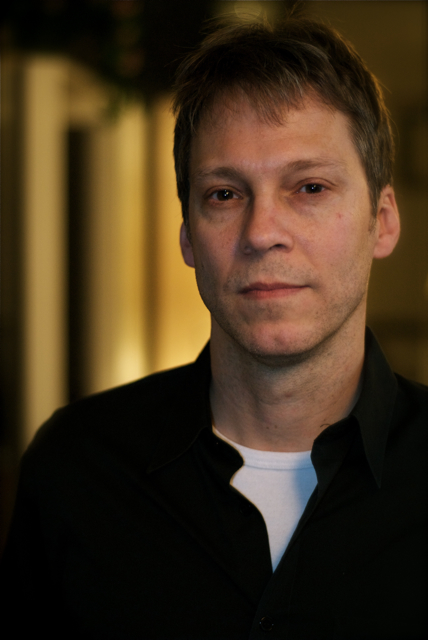
- Lindstrom in 2011
- Born: February 12, 1961; Portland, Oregon, U.S.
- Died: May 15, 2026 (aged 65); Oregon, U.S.
- Education: Lewis & Clark College
- Occupation: Filmmaker
- Spouse: Cheryl Strayed
- Writing career
- Subject: Documentary
- Notable works: Lost Angel: The Genius of Judee Sill 2024 Mothering Inside 2015; Alien Boy: The Life and Death of James Chasse 2013 Finding Normal 2007

Brian Lindstrom (February 12, 1961 – May 15, 2026) was an American documentary filmmaker whose films focused on addiction, incarceration, mental illness and police brutality.

== Background ==
Lindstrom was born and raised in Portland, Oregon, and graduated from Parkrose High School. He held an MFA in screenwriting and film directing from Columbia University and as an undergraduate, he attended Lewis & Clark College, receiving a degree in Communications in 1984. He was mentored by retired Lewis & Clark professor Stuart Kaplan, who inspired Lindstrom to pursue a career in film making.

He was married to the writer Cheryl Strayed. They had two children together and lived in Portland, Oregon. Lindstrom died from complications of progressive supranuclear palsy on May 15, 2026, at the age of 65.

== Career ==
His last film, Lost Angel: The Genius of Judee Sill, premiered at DOCNYC and was awarded Documentary of the Year by Docnroll Film Festival. It is distributed by Greenwich Entertainment and available on Apple TV and Amazon.

With his wife Cheryl Strayed, Lindstrom made I Am Not Untouchable. I Just Have My Period for the New York Times in 2019.

The ACLU of Oregon gave Lindstrom its Civil Liberties Award in 2017. That same year, he received the Distinguished Alumni Award from Lewis & Clark College.

In 2013, Lindstrom directed Alien Boy: The Life and Death of James Chasse. The film examines the life of a man diagnosed with schizophrenia who died in police custody in Portland, Oregon on September 17, 2006. Alien Boy: the Life and Death of James Chasse is distributed by Breaking Glass Pictures and has been shown at film festivals in the U.S. and Canada. Production on Alien Boy began in 2007 and ended in 2013.

Lindstrom made Finding Normal in 2007, a cinema-verite documentary following three long-term addicts trying to rebuild their lives with the help of peer counselors. Lindstrom made the film in 2007 on a budget of $5,000, shooting and editing himself. Finding Normal won awards at the Astoria International and Longbaugh Film Festivals, and was broadcast on Oregon Public Broadcasting. Finding Normal is the only film ever to be shown to inmates in solitary confinement at Oregon State Penitentiary.

Other films directed by Lindstrom include the documentaries Kicking, To Pay My Way With Stories, and Writing Myself. His award-winning narrative short, Lucy's Room, is adapted from the short story "Surprised by Joy," by Charles Baxter. He was awarded a Telly for work on The Visionaries, a PBS documentary series hosted by Sam Waterston.

Beginning in 1994 Lindstrom taught in the Northwest Film Center's Young Filmmaker's Program, using video as a tool of empowerment for at-risk youth. He made many films with youth in Portland, rural Oregon, Texas, Idaho, and the South Bronx.

== Filmography ==
- Kicking (2004)
- Finding Normal (2007)
- Writing Myself
- To Pay My Way With Stories (2012)
- Alien Boy: The Life and Death of James Chasse (2013)
- Mothering Inside (2015)
- I Am Not Untouchable. I Just Have My Period (2019)
- Lost Angel: The Genius of Judee Sill (2024)
