= Love Agenda =

Studio album by Band of Susans
- Released: April 17, 1989
- Recorded: December 1988
- Studio: Planet Studio (New York City, NY)
- Genre: Noise rock, alternative rock
- Length: 45:50 (CD); 38:15 (vinyl)
- Label: Blast First/Restless
- Producer: Robert Poss

Band of Susans chronology
Hope Against Hope (1988)	Love Agenda (1989)	The Word and the Flesh (1991)

Professional ratings
Review scores
Source	Rating
Allmusic	4/5 stars
Chicago Tribune	3.5/4 stars
Trouser Press	favorable

Love Agenda is the second album by Band of Susans, released on April 17, 1989 by Blast First and Restless Records. Page Hamilton, later frontman for Helmet, played guitar on the album and sang the lead vocals on the track "It's Locked Away". Also notable was bassist Susan Stenger singing her first lead vocals on the songs "The Pursuit of Happiness", "Birthmark" and "Hard Light". Robert Poss was an admirer of the Rolling Stones and CD versions of Love Agenda features a cover of "Child of the Moon".

== Track listing ==
All tracks are written by Robert Poss, except "The Pursuit of Happiness", "Birthmark" and "Hard Light" co-written with Susan Stenger.

Side one
No.	Title	Length
1.	"The Pursuit of Happiness"	5:29
2.	"It's Locked Away"	5:10
3.	"Birthmark"	4:09
4.	"Tourniquet"	3:21
5.	"Thorn in My Side"	2:55
Total length:		21:04

Side two
No.	Title	Length
1.	"Sin Embargo"	3:43
2.	"Because of You"	3:52
3.	"Hard Light"	4:41
4.	"Which Dream Came True"	4:55
Total length:		17:11

CD bonus tracks
No.	Title	Length
10.	"Child of the Moon" (The Rolling Stones cover)	4:10
11.	"Take the Express"	3:25
Total length:		7:35

== Personnel ==
Adapted from Love Agenda liner notes.

Band of Susans

- Karen Haglof – electric guitar, backing vocals
- Page Hamilton – electric guitar, lead vocals (A2)
- Robert Poss – electric guitar, lead vocals (A4, B2, B4), production
- Ron Spitzer – drums
- Susan Stenger – bass guitar, lead vocals (A1, A3, B3)

Production and additional personnel

- Chris Gehringer – mastering
- Jim Klein – engineering
- Russ Landis – engineering

== Charts ==
Chart (1989)	Peak position
UK Indie Chart	6

== Release history ==
Region	Date	Label	Format	Catalog
United States	1989	Restless	CD, CS, LP	7 71425
United Kingdom	1989	Blast First	CD, CS, LP	BFFP 43
