= Is This Real? =

Studio album by Wipers
- Released: January 1980
- Recorded: October 1979
- Studios: Recording Associates, Portland, Oregon
- Genre: Punk rock
- Length: 33:55
- Labels: Park Avenue (original); Sub Pop (CD); Jackpot (LP reissue)
- Producer: Greg Sage

Wipers chronology
| Is This Real? (1980) | Alien Boy (EP) (1980) |

Singles from Is This Real?
- 1. "Alien Boy" Released: 1980

Is This Real? is the debut studio album by the Portland, Oregon-based punk rock band Wipers, originally released on vinyl in January 1980 by Park Avenue Records. The album's release was preceded by the band's Better Off Dead EP. The album shows a more immediate punk sound than the band's successive records, which would take on longer, post-punk styles and structures.

The album was little noticed upon its initial release, gaining a small cult following. Today it is regarded as a classic, seminal record in Pacific Northwest punk, and was later listed by Kurt Cobain as one of his top 50 albums of all time. The album produced a single and associated EP, Alien Boy, and would follow up the album in 1981 with Youth of America.

The album was reissued on CD by Sub Pop in 1993, augmented by the three tracks from Alien Boy EP. In 2001, it was digitally remastered by Sage and reissued again on his own Zeno Records as part of a 3-CD set, with the track list altered so that the song "Alien Boy" appeared together with the other three tracks from the Alien Boy EP, after "Wait a Minute". It was reissued on LP by Jackpot Records in 2006, remastered again from the original tapes that Sage provided to the label.

== Background ==
Wipers formed in 1977 by guitarist Greg Sage. Originally intending to just record albums without touring, the band released their first EP, Better off Dead, in 1978. Sage attempted to release the band on his own Trap Records, but later decided to join Park Avenue Records. They would record their debut album, Is This Real? originally recorded on a 4-track in the band's rehearsal studio. However, the label insisted that the band use a professional studio.

== Reception ==
Professional ratings
Review scores
| Source | Rating |
|---|---|
| AllMusic | 4/5 stars |
| Christgau's Record Guide | B+ |
| The Great Alternative & Indie Discography | 7/10 |
| Laut.de | 5/5 stars |
| MusicHound Rock | 4/5 stars |
| OndaRock | 7.5/10 |
| Q | 4/5 stars |
| The Rolling Stone Record Guide | 3/5 stars |
| Select | 4/5 medals |
| Spin Alternative Record Guide | 7/10 |

When released, the album was not promoted and received little attention, only developing a cult following in the band's hometown. Reviewing for The Village Voice in 1980, Robert Christgau wrote, "Three guys from Portland (Oregon, but it might just as well be Maine) who caught on to punk unfashionably late and for that reason sound like they're still discovering something. Which hardly makes them unique--there are similar bands in dozens if not hundreds of American cities, many of whom send me records. What distinguishes this one is Greg Sage's hard-edged vocals--detached but never silly, passionate but never overwrought--and economical one-hook construction".

=== Reappraisal & legacy ===
The album (and the band's music in general) gained a slightly wider audience during the early 1990s when grunge band Nirvana covered the songs "Return of the Rat" and "D-7" on a Wipers tribute album and the group's Hormoaning EP. A different mix of the tribute album recording appeared on the 2004 Nirvana box set With the Lights Out. In 1993, Nirvana vocalist/guitarist Kurt Cobain listed Is This Real?, along with two other Wipers albums, in his list of 50 albums he thought were most influential to Nirvana's sound in his Journals. BBC Radio 1 DJ John Peel stated in a 1993 interview that it was one of his top 20 favorite albums.

Is This Real? later came to be regarded as a classic punk rock album of the 1980s. Stephen Howell of AllMusic, in his retrospective review, stated that the production "leaves much to be desired with its tinny-sounding drums, but fortunately, the negatives don't outweigh the positives." He also said that Sage wrote "fairly simplistic songs with power chords, but each melody infects your brain like a fever" and noted that much of the album has a dark and ominous feel. In 2001, Spin ranked it the 40th most "essential" punk album of all time.

== Cover versions ==
Apart from the aforementioned Nirvana cover, "Return of the Rat" was also covered by Bored! on their album Scuzz. The track "Mystery" was covered by numerous bands including Eagulls, JEFF the Brotherhood, Shellshag, Rose Melberg, and Meat Wave. "Up Front" was covered by Poison Idea and Corin Tucker, "Potential Suicide" by Napalm Beach, and "Wait a Minute" by My Vitriol.

== Track listing ==
All tracks are written by Greg Sage.

Side +
| No. | Title | Length |
|---|---|---|
| 1. | "Return of the Rat" | 2:37 |
| 2. | "Mystery" | 1:46 |
| 3. | "Up Front" | 3:04 |
| 4. | "Let's Go Away" (Listed as "Let's Go Let's Go Away" on the original release) | 1:47 |
| 5. | "Is This Real?" | 2:39 |
| 6. | "Tragedy" | 1:59 |
| 7. | "Alien Boy" | 3:18 |

Side -
| No. | Title | Length |
|---|---|---|
| 1. | "D-7" | 4:04 |
| 2. | "Potential Suicide" | 3:35 |
| 3. | "Don't Know What I Am" | 2:56 |
| 4. | "Window Shop for Love" | 2:59 |
| 5. | "Wait a Minute" | 3:05 |
| Total length: | | 33:55 |

== Personnel ==
- Greg Sage – lead vocals, guitar
- Dave Koupal – bass
- Sam Henry – drums

Production

- Greg Sage – producer
- Bob Stoutenberg – engineer, recording
- Mark Heim; Mike King – cover art
- Jay Elliot – sleeve art
