= Wipers (band) =

American punk rock band

- Origin: Portland, Oregon, U.S.
- Genres: Punk rock; post-punk; post-hardcore; hardcore punk
- Years active: 1977–1989; 1993–1999
- Labels: Trap; Park Avenue; Engima; Restless; Tim/Kerr; Zeno; Jackpot
- Past members: Greg Sage; Sam Henry; Dave Koupal; Brad Naish; Brad Davidson; Steve Plouf; Travis McNabb; Moses Gershbein (aka Bob Schermerhorn); Dov Friedman
- Website: zenorecords.com

Wipers were an American punk rock band formed in Portland, Oregon, in 1977 by guitarist and vocalist Greg Sage, along with drummer Sam Henry and bassist Dave Koupal. Initially starting as a traditional punk rock band on their early releases Better off Dead, Is This Real? and Alien Boy, the band would later pivot to more Post-punk influenced stylings on their second and third albums, Youth of America, and Over the Edge.

The group's tight song structure and use of heavy distortion were hailed as extremely influential by numerous critics and musicians. In particular, Kurt Cobain of Nirvana, and J Mascis of Dinosaur Jr. both praised Sage's guitar work and cited him as an influence. They are also considered to be the first Pacific Northwest punk band, and are today hailed as seminal for the scene.

== History ==
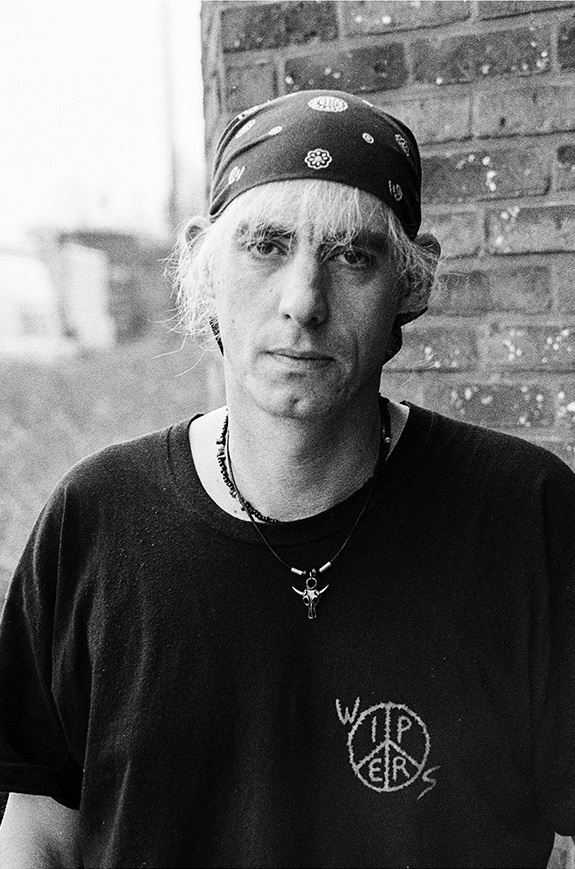
Vocalist and guitarist Greg Sage in 1992.

=== Origins ===
Sage's intense interest in music began with cutting records at home as an adolescent, when his father brought home a Disc cutting lathe from work. Sage said, "I would cut records for friends at school of songs off the radio and learned the art of record making long before learning to play music. [...] I might have spent too much time studying music through a microscope because it gave me a completely different outlook on what music is and a totally opposite understanding of it as well. There was something very magical and private when I zoomed into the magnified and secret world of sound in motion. I got to the point that I needed to create and paint my own sounds and colors into the walls of these grooves."

Inspired by Jimi Hendrix, Sage soon picked up the guitar. In 1969, at age 17, he played on an eponymous album by professional wrestler Beauregarde.

=== Foundation, early years ===
Sage founded Wipers in Portland in 1977 along with drummer Henry and bassist Koupal, originally just as a recording project. The plan was to record 15 albums in 10 years without touring or promotion. Sage thought that the mystique built from the lack of playing traditional rock 'n' roll would make people listen to their recordings much deeper with only their imagination to go by. He thought it would be easy to avoid press, shows, pictures and interviews. He looked at music as art rather than entertainment; he thought music was personal to the listener rather than a commodity.

Wipers' first single, "Better Off Dead", was released in 1978 on Sage's own Trap Records. Sage wanted to make his own recordings and manufacture and run his own label without outside financing. In 1979, Sage approached several Portland punk bands (including Neo Boys, Sado-Nation and Stiphnoyds) and asked them to record singles for his new Trap label. However, he would eventually decide to record for Park Avenue Records, hoping to gain greater exposure this way.

The Wipers first album, Is This Real?, was issued in January 1980 on Park Avenue Records, a label that the band hoped would gain them wider distribution. It was originally recorded on a 4-track in the band's rehearsal studio, but the label insisted that the band use a professional studio. Once released, the album gained a cult following, although the band was best known for their live shows around the Portland area. Later in 1980, Park Avenue released the Alien Boy EP, consisting of the title track and three demo outtakes.

"Youth of America"
Sample of "Youth of America", from the 1981 album Youth of America by the Wipers. The full song is over 10 minutes long.

After the release of the album and the EP, Henry left to join the Rats, and Koupal moved to Ohio. Sage would rebuild the rhythm section with bassist Brad Davidson and drummer Brad Naish (ex-Stiphnoyds), Wipers recorded a second album for Park Avenue, the last for that label. Youth of America, released in 1981, contrasted with the short/fast punk songs of the time. According to Sage, this change of pace was a reaction against the punk trend of releasing short songs. The album was, according to Sage, not well received in the United States at the time of its release, though it did fare better in Europe. Along with other Wipers records, Youth of America came to be acknowledged as an important album in the development of American underground and independent rock movements of the early 80s.

The next album, Over the Edge, issued in 1983 by Trap via Brain Eater Records, was the first Wipers record to gain significant modern rock airplay. It was led by the song, "Romeo", which had already been released the previous year as a 7" single by Trap. The band then embarked on their first extensive tour, documented on the Wipers Tour 84 cassette-only live album, which was reissued by Enigma Records in 1985 as Wipers.

However, Park Avenue would go bankrupt, leaving Sage stranded due to his financial investments in the label. In an attempt to save both himself and the band, he recorded his first solo album issued by Enigma, Straight Ahead.

Signing to Enigma's Restless Records division, Wipers released 1986's Land of the Lost, featuring the song "Let Me Know", used in the film River's Edge. It was followed by Follow Blind (1987) and The Circle (1988). All three records were recorded in Sage's studio 421 Sound.

In 1989, drummer Travis McNabb joined Wipers for a tour, during which Sage announced that the band was ending due to music business frustrations and the loss of their studio space. Sage then relocated to Phoenix, Arizona, and Davidson left to move to London. After building a new recording studio in Arizona, Sage released a second solo album, 1991's Sacrifice (For Love).

Sage restarted Wipers in 1993, rejoined by Plouf, releasing three additional albums as a duo: Silver Sail (1993) and The Herd (1996), both on the Tim/Kerr label, and Power in One (1999) on Sage's new Zeno Records. The band became inactive after 1999.

In 2001, Zeno released Wipers Box Set, which included the first three Wipers albums, which by that time had been long out-of-print, along with the songs from the Alien Boy EP and additional previously unreleased material. Jackpot Records and Sage later reissued Is This Real?, Youth of America and Over the Edge on vinyl.

=== Post-Wipers ===
Henry formed Napalm Beach with Chris Newman in 1982. He remained an active musician in Portland, Oregon, and continued to play with Napalm Beach and Don't, as well as popular Pacific Northwest songwriters such as Pete Krebs, Morgan Grace and Jimmy Boyer. Henry died from complications of stomach cancer on February 20, 2022, at the age of 65.

Plouf operated a vintage goods/Zeno Records store in Portland, named Zeno Oddities, which closed sometime between 2009 and 2010.[source?]

McNabb formed the Beggars, and went on to work as a session and tour drummer for artists including Vigilantes of Love, Billy Pilgrim, Shawn Mullins, Indigo Girls, Brendan Benson, Howie Day, Dar Williams, Mandi Perkins, Big & Rich and Gavin DeGraw. McNabb was a member of Better Than Ezra from 1996 to 2009. In 2007, he joined bluegrass/country music act Sugarland.

Davidson (who had previously recorded with the Sage-produced Rancid Vat in 1985) played bass on The Jesus and Mary Chain's 1993 EP Sound of Speed.

== Influence and legacy ==
Sage later remarked on their initial reception: "We weren't even really a punk band. See, we were even farther out in left field than the punk movement because we didn't even wish to be classified, and that was kind of a new territory. ... When we put out Is This Real? ... it definitely did not fit in; none of our records did. Then nine, ten years later people are saying: 'Yeah, it's the punk classic of the '80s'".

In 1992, tribute album Eight Songs for Greg Sage and the Wipers was released by Tim/Kerr as a box set of four colored 7" records, featuring Wipers songs performed by Nirvana, Hole, Napalm Beach, M99, Dharma Bums, Crackerbash, Poison Idea, and the Whirlees. The expanded CD release, retitled Fourteen Songs for Greg Sage and the Wipers, also included covers by Hazel, Calamity Jane, Saliva Tree, Honey, Nation of Ulysses, and Thurston Moore and Keith Nealy.

Nirvana was also influenced by Wipers. Similarities can be heard between lines of Wipers' song "Potential Suicide" and Nirvana's track "Breed". Wipers gained significant exposure as a result of Nirvana's 1992 covers of two songs from Is This Real? ("D-7" on the EP Hormoaning, and "Return of the Rat" on the Eight Songs compilation. "D-7" was also released as a B-side on the UK CD single release of "Lithium" and played as part of Nirvana's 1992 live show that was later released as Live At Reading). Kurt Cobain's list of his top 50 albums, probably written in 1993, included the first three Wipers' albums. His wife, Courtney Love, whose band Hole covered "Over the Edge" both on recording and frequently at live performances, was also influenced by the band. German grunge band, Alien Boys named themselves from Wipers song Alien Boy. J Mascis of Dinosaur Jr. has cited Sage as a foundational influence on his own guitar work. Other bands that have cited Wipers as an influence include Mudhoney, Cloud Nothings, Hot Snakes, and Metz.

== Members ==
Final lineup

- Greg Sage – vocals, guitar (1977–1989, 1993–1999) bass (1993–1999, only in the studio)
- Steve Plouf – drums (1985–1988, 1993–1999)

Former members

- Sam Henry – drums (1977–1980) (died 2022)
- Dave Koupal – bass (1977–1981)
- Brad Naish – drums (1981–1985)
- Brad Davidson – bass (1981–1987)
- Travis McNabb – drums (1989, former touring member)

Timeline

== Discography ==
=== Studio albums ===
- Is This Real? (1980, Park Avenue Records)
- Youth of America (1981, Park Avenue Records)
- Over the Edge (1983, Brain Eater Records) (licensed under agreement with Trap Records)
- Land of the Lost (1986, Restless Records)
- Follow Blind (1987, Restless Records)
- The Circle (1988, Restless Records)
- Silver Sail (1993, Tim/Kerr)
- The Herd (1996, Tim/Kerr)
- Power in One (1999, Zeno Records)

=== Live albums ===
- Wipers Tour 84 (1984, Trap Records)

=== EPs ===
- Alien Boy (1980, Park Avenue Records)

=== Singles ===
- "Better Off Dead" (1978, Trap Records)
- "Romeo" (1982, Trap Records)
- "Silver Sail" (1993, Tim/Kerr)
- "The Herd" (1996, Tim/Kerr)
- "Insane" (1996, Tim/Kerr)

=== Compilation albums ===
- The Best of Wipers and Greg Sage (1990, Restless Records)
- Complete Rarities '78–'90 (2001, Objects Of Rarity)
- Wipers Box Set (2001, Zeno Records)
- Out Takes (2010, Jackpot Records)

=== Compilation appearances ===
- "Same Old Thing" on 10-29-79 (1980, Trap Records)
- "My Vengeance" and "The Story" on Trap Sampler (1981, Trap Records)
- "Nothin' to Prove (Live)" on Sub Pop 9 (1983, Sub Pop) and Sub Pop 100 (1986, Sub Pop)
- "Let Me Know" on River's Edge (1987, Enigma Records)
- "Return of the Rat" on Hype! The Motion Picture Soundtrack (1996, Sub Pop)
