= Hope Against Hope (album) =

Studio album by Band of Susans
- Released: 1988
- Recorded: May – June 1987
- Studio: Platinum Island (New York City, NY)
- Genre: Noise rock, alternative rock
- Length: 49:36 (CD); 40:42 (vinyl)
- Label: Blast First
- Producer: Robert Poss

Band of Susans chronology
| Blessing and Curse (1987) | Hope Against Hope (1988) | Love Agenda (1989) |

Professional ratings
Review scores
| Source | Rating |
|---|---|
| AllMusic | 2.5/5 stars |

Hope Against Hope is the 1988 debut studio album by Band of Susans, released in 1988 on Blast First. The CD version includes their debut EP Blessing and Curse, which contains "Sometimes" and "Where Have All the Flowers Gone". They were based in New York City.

== Track listing ==
All tracks are written by Robert Poss.

Side one
| No. | Title | Length |
|---|---|---|
| 1. | "Not Even Close" | 4:58 |
| 2. | "Learning to Sin" | 3:04 |
| 3. | "Throne of Blood" | 3:15 |
| 4. | "Elliott Abrams in Hell" | 2:21 |
| 5. | "All the Wrong Reasons" | 5:25 |

Side two
| No. | Title | Length |
|---|---|---|
| 1. | "I the Jury" | 4:26 |
| 2. | "No God" | 4:59 |
| 3. | "You Were an Optimist" | 3:19 |
| 4. | "Ready to Bend" | 3:51 |
| 5. | "Hope Against Hope" | 4:59 |

CD bonus tracks
| No. | Title | Length |
|---|---|---|
| 11. | "Sometimes" | 3:53 |
| 12. | "Where Have All the Flowers Gone" | 5:01 |

== Personnel ==
Adapted from Hope Against Hope liner notes.

Band of Susans

- Susan Lyall – electric guitar, backing vocals
- Robert Poss – lead vocals, electric guitar, production
- Alva Rogers – backing vocals
- Ron Spitzer – drums
- Susan Stenger – bass guitar, backing vocals
- Susan Tallman – electric guitar

Production

- Chris Gehringer – mastering
- John Herman – assistant engineer
- Jim Klein – engineering

== Charts ==
| Chart (1988) | Peak position |
|---|---|
| UK Indie Chart | 11 |

== Release history ==
| Region | Date | Label | Format | Catalog |
|---|---|---|---|---|
| United Kingdom | 1988 | Blast First | CD, LP | FU5 |
