= Greg Sage =

American songwriter, guitarist (b. 1951)

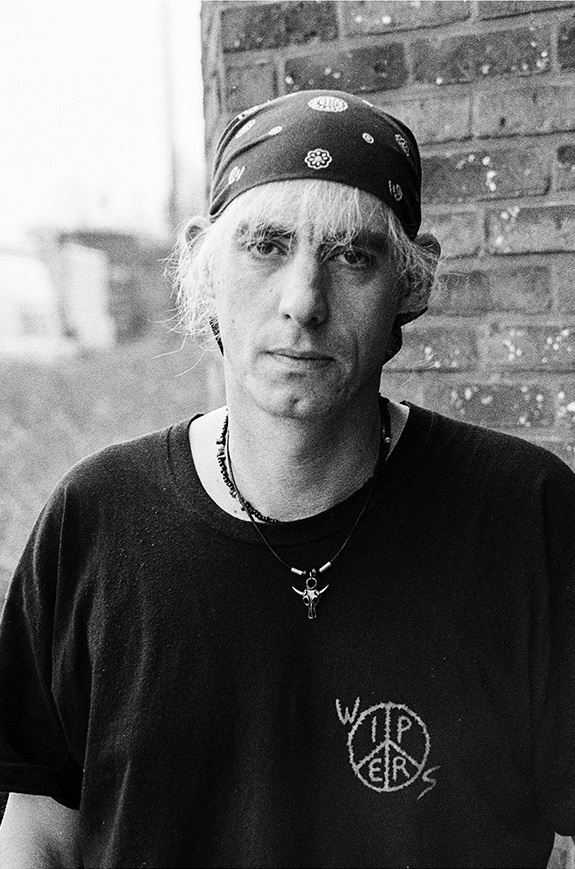
- Sage in 1992

Background information
- Born: Greg Sage; Portland, Oregon, U.S.
- Genres: Punk rock, post-punk
- Occupations: Musician, songwriter, record producer
- Instruments: Vocals, guitar
- Years active: 1977–present
- Labels: Enigma Records, Restless, Zeno Records, Jackpot Records
- Formerly of: Wipers

Greg Sage is an American songwriter, guitarist, and vocalist, regarded as an important influence on many punk rock and post-punk artists. Sage is best known as the principal songwriter and vocalist/guitarist of the influential Portland, Oregon-based band Wipers.

== Early life ==
Sage was born in Portland, Oregon, on October 21, 1951. His involvement with music began with cutting records at home as an adolescent, due to his father being involved in the broadcast industry. Sage’s first choice of instrument was bass guitar, because of the low tones that made larger grooves in the vinyl records due to slower modulations; but since basses were hard to find and very expensive when Sage was in grade school, he learned regular guitar instead.

Sage has been involved in music professionally since the age of 17, when he worked on a full-length album by the professional wrestler Beauregarde (Beauregard, 1971; re-released 2004). After several years of playing and recording guitar, Sage founded Wipers in Portland in 1977.

== Career ==
=== Wipers ===
In 1977, Sage founded the Wipers. The name was inspired by a job he had picked up cleaning windows at a movie theatre; the crystal clear transparency of the glass was what he realized he wanted to emulate with his music. Its inception was at first an exclusive recording project. Then Sage planned to record 15 LPs in 10 years without touring or promoting. He believed it would be possible to avoid live shows, press, pictures and interviews, and this – coupled with the mystique of his unorthodox music – would encourage a deeper, more imaginative engagement with the recordings.

In 1979, Sage established his own record label, Trap, and asked several Portland punk bands to record singles. Some of those early bands were The Stiphnoyds, The Neo Boys and Sado Nation. Sage later re-released some of the material on a compilation record entitled The History Of Portland Punk.

=== Solo career ===
Since the demise of Wipers, Sage has also recorded several albums as a solo musician and operates his own label, Zeno Records, based in Phoenix, Arizona, where he currently resides.

== Artistry ==
The mood of Sage's lyrics is frequently dark, and rife with references to confusion and severe alienation. His song structures often take unexpected turns and are typified by fractured melodic passages punctuated by massive, intricate guitar parts, and use of heavy distortion. He usually plays on a 1969 left-handed Gibson SG with P-90 pickups and a Bigsby tremolo.

== Discography ==
=== Solo albums ===
- Straight Ahead (1985)
- Sacrifice (For Love) (1991)

=== With Wipers ===
- Is This Real? (1980)
- Youth of America (1981)
- Over the Edge (1983)
- Land of the Lost (1986)
- Follow Blind (1987)
- The Circle (1988)
- Silver Sail (1993)
- The Herd (1996)
- Power in One (1999)
