= Robert Poss =

American guitarist and music producer

- Genres: Noise rock, shoegazing, alternative rock
- Occupation: Musician
- Instruments: Vocals, guitar
- Years active: 1980–present
- Label: Trace Elements
- Formerly of: Band of Susans

Robert Poss is an American guitarist and music producer. He was the front man and primary composer for Band of Susans between 1986 and 1996. He has also collaborated with Rhys Chatham and the band When People Were Shorter and Lived Near the Water. He co-founded Trace Elements Records in 1980, which released records from artists such as Nicolas Collins and Phill Niblock.

== Discography ==
- Sometimes (1986)
- Inverse Guitar (1988) - with Nicolas Collins
- ManchesterLondon (2000)
- Distortion Is Truth (2002)
- Crossing Casco Bay (2002)
- Frozen Flowers Curse The Day (2018)
- Drones, Songs and Fairy Dust (2024)
