= Blast First =

British record label

- Parent company: Mute Records
- Founded: 1984
- Founder: Paul Smith
- Distributors: Alternative Distribution Alliance (Back catalogue); Caroline Distribution, PIAS (New catalogue)
- Genre: Alternative rock, indie rock, noise rock
- Country of origin: United Kingdom
- Location: London

Blast First is a sub label of one-time independent record label Mute Records, founded in approximately 1985. It was named after a phrase taken from the first number of the radical Vorticist journal Blast, published by Wyndham Lewis in 1914. Lewis's "Manifesto" begins with the words "BLAST First (from politeness) ENGLAND".

== History ==
The label was founded by Paul Smith to give UK release to albums by Sonic Youth, a US band with which he was then working closely. It went on to feature more hardcore rock bands than the master label of its synthpop-oriented parent company. Before Mute Records was sold to the EMI group, Blast First fit into the company's profile, which included labels such as the Fine Line and the Grey Area.

The label's employees included the sisters Pat and Liz Naylor, and the novelist Alistair Fruish.

The label released a range of alternative music from Butthole Surfers and Labradford through Suicide and Sonic Youth to the William Fairey Band's Acid Brass collection. The latter, a departure for a label noted for its guitar based rock bands, was a covers album of tunes such as A Guy Called Gerald's "Voodoo Ray" and 808 State's "Pacific," all replayed by a brass band. Blast First also organised the Disobey experimental club nights, with Russell Haswell and Bruce Gilbert (aka DJ Beekeeper) of the Post-punk band Wire.

== Artists ==
- A.C. Temple
- Acid Brass
- The Afghan Whigs
- Band of Susans
- Beme Seed
- Big Black
- Big Stick
- The Blue Humans
- Glenn Branca
- Caspar Brötzmann Massaker
- Butthole Surfers
- Common Language
- Dinosaur Jr.
- Easy
- FM Einheit & Caspar Brötzmann
- Erase Errata
- Fushitsusha
- The Charles Gayle Trio
- Michael Gibbs
- H.O.D.I.C.A.
- Keiji Haino
- Head of David
- Hovercraft
- HTRK
- KaitO
- Richard H. Kirk
- Labradford
- Liars
- Lunachicks
- Maxine
- The Mekons
- Mother Goose
- Phill Niblock
- Pan Sonic
- Rapeman
- The Raincoats
- Rivulets
- Sonic Youth
  - Ciccone Youth
  - Lee Ranaldo
- Stretchheads
- Suicide
- Sun Ra
- Jimi Tenor
- Ed Tomney
- 2K
- Ut

== Compilation series ==
- Sonic Mook Experiment
- The Devil's Jukebox (Nothing Short Of Total War) – deleted limited edition box set; 3000 UK copies and 1500 US copies were made.

== Noted albums ==
Albums on Blast First that either reached the UK Albums Chart or have become examples of the indie/alternative genre:

- Big Black – Songs About Fucking (1987) (BFFP 19)
- Sonic Youth – Daydream Nation 2xLP (1988) (BFFP 34)
- Afghan Whigs – Gentlemen (1993) (BFFP 89)
- Butthole Surfers – Locust Abortion Technician (1987) (BFFP 23)

(Note: Blast First was merely the UK label for these US bands, which were all primarily signed to deals with American labels).

== See also ==
- List of record labels
