= Restless Records =

American record label

- Logo from 1996 to 2001
- Parent company: Warner Music Group
- Founded: 1985
- Founder: Enigma Records
- Defunct: 2001
- Status: Merged with Rykodisc
- Distributors: Alternative; Warner
- Genre: Heavy metal Rock; Alternative rock Punk rock Indie rock
- Location: El Segundo, California

Restless Records was an American record label founded in El Segundo, California in 1985 by Enigma Records and primarily released alternative, metal and punk records. In addition to its own catalog, Restless licensed and distributed records from labels such as Bar/None Records, Metal Blade Records and Mute Records. The company also operated a wholly owned subsidiary, Pink Dust Records.

== History and record label work ==
In 1991, Restless and a number of Enigma Records titles were acquired by Bill Hein and Joe Regis and re-launched in Hollywood, California.

In 1992, Restless acquired the Twin/Tone Records label and classic titles by such artists as The Replacements, Soul Asylum, The Jayhawks and Ween. This added to Restless' already substantial catalogue of titles by They Might Be Giants, The Cramps, The Dead Milkmen, Devo, The Flaming Lips, Stiff Little Fingers, T.S.O.L. among others.

In 1993, Restless co-founded Alternative Distribution Alliance (ADA) with Warner Brothers Music Group (WMG) to handle its distribution and certain titles released by Warner Bros., Elektra Records, Atlantic Records, their affiliates and Sub Pop Records. Sub Pop subsequently became a partner in the venture. Within 10 years, ADA went on to become the largest distributor of independent music in America.

In 1997, Restless was acquired by New Regency Productions, a leading independent film production company which had signed a 15 year distribution deal with 20th Century Fox that same year. Restless remained a subsidiary of New Regency until 2001, during which time, Restless released many of New Regency's soundtracks including L.A. Confidential, Fight Club and Malcolm In The Middle (the title song to which earned They Might Be Giants a Grammy in 2001).

In 2001, after New Regency sold its stake back to Hein and Regis, Restless entered into a distribution agreement with Ryko Distribution. This partnership ultimately led to the label's acquisition by Ryko Corporation. Ryko itself was later acquired by Warner Music Group in 2006.

== Artists ==
- 45 Grave
- Adrenalin O.D.
- Agent Orange
- AMiniature
- The Bags
- Band of Susans
- Tim Buckley
- Lori Carson
- Chopper One
- Cinderblock
- Cirith Ungol
- Crain
- Danzig
- Dead Milkmen
- Death Angel
- Devo
- Doughboys
- Dream Syndicate
- Econoline Crush
- Elvis Hitler
- The Fibonaccis
- The Flaming Lips
- Forgotten Rebels
- Get Smart!
- Russ Tolman
- Giant Sand
- Crispin Glover
- The Golden Palominos
- Green on Red
- Hellion
- IronChrist
- Jailhouse
- The Johnsons
- Little Caesar
- Metric
- Michael Sweet
- The Moog Cookbook
- Nova Mob
- Old Skull
- The Outlets
- Ovis
- Pajama Slave Dancers
- The Pandoras
- Perfect
- Punchbuggy
- Radar Bros.
- The Shivers
- Social Distortion
- Spain
- Suncatcher
- Straw Dogs (formerly The F.U.'s)
- They Might Be Giants
- T.S.O.L.
- Top Jimmy & The Rhythm Pigs
- Terrance Simien and the Mallet Playboys
- The Vandals
- Wall of Voodoo
- Warren G
- Ween
- Wipers/Greg Sage
- YMO
- You Am I
- The Zeros (1990s glam band)

== See also ==
- List of record labels
- Record labels based in California
