= Jenny Don't and the Spurs =

American country western band

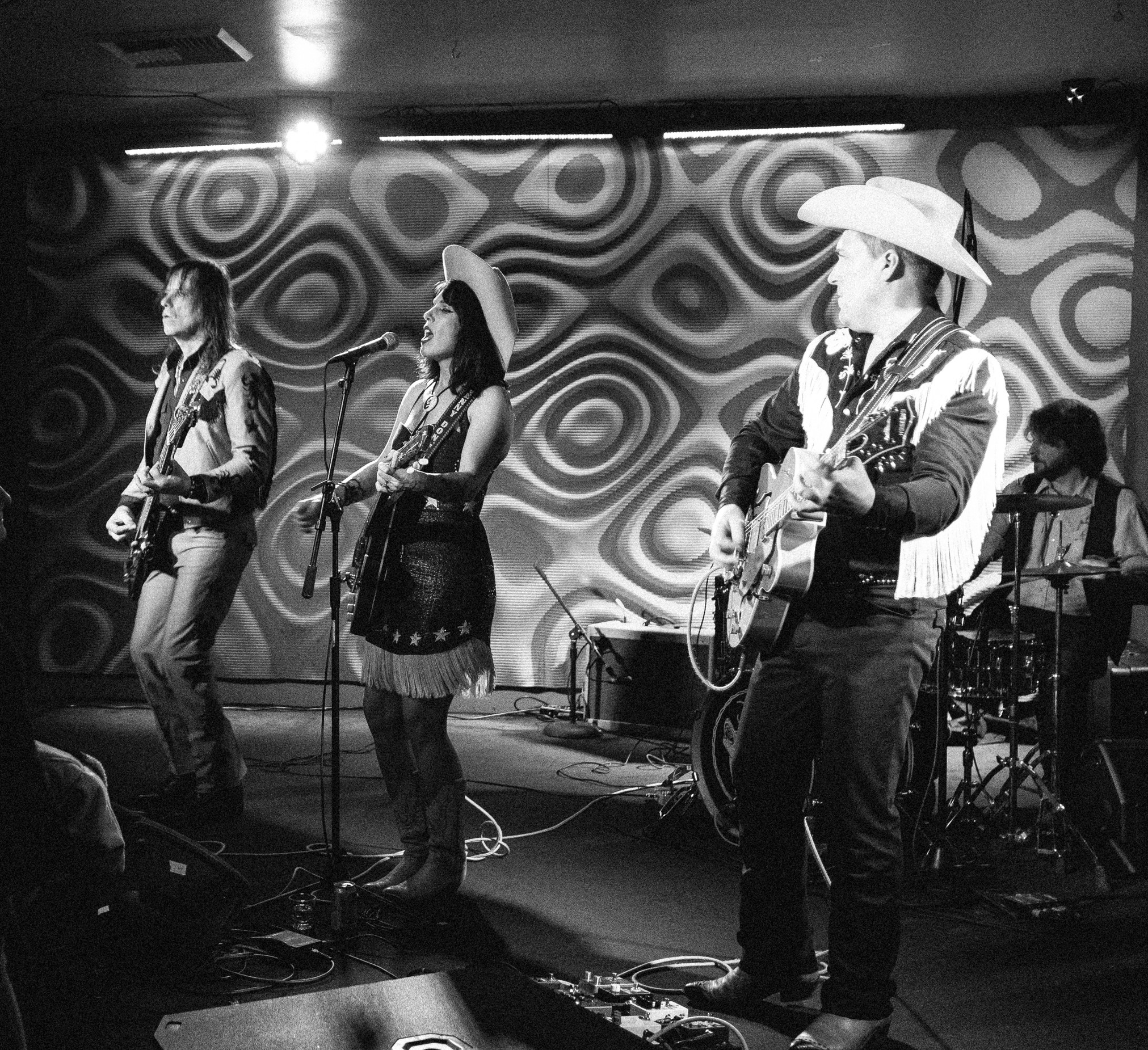
- Jenny Don't and the Spurs in 2024

Background information
- Origin: Portland, Oregon, U.S.
- Genres: western; outlaw country; honky tonk; cowpunk; garage rock; Americana
- Years active: 2011–present
- Labels: Doomtown Sounds; Fluff And Gravy; Missing Fink; Rockstar Records; We Empty Rooms
- Members: Jenny Don't; Kelly Halliburton; Christopher March; Buddy Weeks
- Past members: Sam Henry; Lewi Longmire; JT Halmfist
- Website: jennydontandthespurs.com

Jenny Don't and the Spurs are an American country western band based in Portland, Oregon. The band's style has been described variously as honky tonk, garage rock, and cowpunk.

== History ==
=== Early years (2012–2014) ===
Jenny Don't and the Spurs was formed in the winter of 2012 by Jenny Don't and Kelly Halliburton. Both Jenny and Kelly were already involved in touring bands: Don’t and Pierced Arrows, respectively. Described by Kelly as a “kitchen table project”, the band initially focused on covering classic country artists such as Patsy Cline, Hank Williams Sr, Ernest Tubb, and Loretta Lynn. Soon after the band's formation, Sam Henry (Wipers, Napalm Beach), who was the drummer in Don't, was invited to join the duo.

The band made their debut performance at Portland's Ash Street Saloon on March 15, 2012, supporting Fred and Toody Cole's (Dead Moon, Pierced Arrows) acoustic duo project.

In early 2013 the band recorded their first release, a nine song CDr.

Occasionally the trio invited various friends to sit in on guitar and sometimes lap steel guitar. Fellow Portland musicians Dan Lowinger (also of Jenny's punk band DON'T), Lewi Longmire, and JT Halmfilst all contributed to the band's live performances and early recordings.

Halmfilst eventually joined the band as a full-time member, playing both six-string and lap steel guitar.

=== First album (2014–2016) ===
In mid 2014, the band recorded their first album at Portland's Red Lantern Studios. The album was engineered and mixed by studio co-owner Evan "Maus" Mersky. Guitar tracks on the album were recorded by Halmfilst and Lewi Longmire, and additional guests were invited to contribute. One of these guests was Jerry "A" Lang, singer for the Portland punk band Poison Idea, who joined Jenny for a duet on the band's cover of Lee Hazlewood and Nancy Sinatra's "Ladybird".

The album was released in 2015 under Jenny and Kelly's label, Doomtown Sounds.

In 2016 the band embarked on several tours, playing extensively in California and touring Europe twice.

=== Call of the Road and Fire on the Ridge (2017–2021) ===
In spring 2017, the band released their secondalbum, Call of the Road, a collaboration with Doomtown Sounds and Portland-based label Mississippi Records. Similar to their first album, this record was also recorded at Red Lantern studios in Portland.

After the release of Call of the Road, Halmfilst departed from the band, and Christopher March joined as a full-time guitarist.

From 2018 to 2019, the band went on multiple tours across North America and Europe to promote Call of the Road. During breaks between tours, they started writing songs for their third studio album, eventually titled Fire on the Ridge. Recording sessions for the album began in the spring of 2019 at a studio owned by Fluff and Gravy Records, situated in the basement of label co-owner John Shepski's residence.

Recording for Fire on the Ridge faced delays due to Jenny undergoing surgery to remove vocal cord polyps. Despite the setback, the album was eventually released in June 2021. Following its release, the band embarked on a tour opening for country musician Charley Crockett.

=== Sam's death and years following (2022–2023) ===
In January 2022, while on tour, Sam Henry began experiencing abdominal pains, which worsened over time. The final date of the tour was canceled, and Henry was taken to the emergency room in Portland. Medical assessments revealed advanced-stage stomach cancer, and he received a prognosis of only a few months to live. He died from the disease weeks later on February 20, 2022.

Henry's final performance, was just a few weeks earlier at Fawcett Hall in Tacoma, Washington, on January 28, 2022.

Following Sam's death, the three surviving members were unsure whether to continue or not. However, after much discussion and debate, it was decided to continue. After some tentative performances and tours with fill-in drummers, Portland drummer Buddy Weeks joined the band in December 2022.

On February 19, 2023, Jenny Don't and the Spurs were awarded the title of outlaw band of the year at Dale Watson's Ameripolitan Music Awards in Memphis, Tennessee.

Throughout 2023, the band performed over 150 concerts across the United States, Europe, Australia, and Southeast Asia. Their tour spanned 20 US states and 16 countries, including Australia, New Zealand, Indonesia, Malaysia, and the Philippines.

=== Broken Hearted Blue album (2024) ===
The band's fourth album, Broken Hearted Blue, was released on June 14, accompanied by a multiple tours spanning Europe, Mexico, and the US. The album was recorded with Collin Hegna from Federale and Brian Jonestown Massacre at Revolver Studios in Portland, Oregon.

== Discography ==
=== Studio albums ===
- Self Titled (2015)
- Call of the Road (2017)
- Fire on the Ridge (2021)
- Lovesick Crawl (2023) EP
- Broken Hearted Blue (2024)

=== Live albums ===
- Live in Bonn (2017 cassette)
- Live at the Jenny (2025)

=== Compilation albums ===
- The Singles Roundup (2023)

=== Singles ===
- "No Good" / "You Win Again" (2013)
- "Trouble with the Law" / "My Blue Heart" (2014)
- "A Western Holiday" (2017)
- "What Can I Do" / "Still as the Night" (2018)
- "Right from the Start" / "Three or Four Nights" (2019)
- "Paso Del Norte" / "Honky Tonk Fool" (2019)
- "Mr. Fire Eyes" (2020)
- "California Cowboy" / "Mr. Fire Eyes" (2022)
- "Jealous Heart" / "I Just Don't Understand" (2023)
- "One More Night / Fire In The Western World" (2023)
- "Flyin' High / War Cry!" (2024)
- "Sidewinder / Wherever You Are" (2025)
