= In the Graveyard =

Studio album by Dead Moon
- Released: 1988
- Recorded: 1987–88
- Studio: Fresh Tracks (at Portland, Oregon); River Recordings
- Genre: Garage punk; garage rock; punk blues
- Length: 28:37
- Label: Tombstone Records
- Producer: Fred Cole

Dead Moon chronology
In the Graveyard (1988)	Unknown Passage (1989)

Professional ratings
Review scores
Source	Rating
Allmusic	4.5/5 stars

In the Graveyard is the debut album by American garage punk band Dead Moon, released in 1988 by Tombstone Records. At the time, Cole was recognized for his involvement in the psychedelic garage rock band the Lollipop Shoppe, which influenced the lo-fi monaural album.

== Background ==
At the time, singer and guitarist Fred Cole had been in the garage rock scene for over 20 years, having been primarily known for his involvement with the Lollipop Shoppe back in the late 1960s. After the band broke up in 1969, Cole played in multiple, short-lived bands such as Zipper, King Bee, the Rats (with Toody Cole), the Western Front, and the Range Rats.

In 1987, after breaking up with multiple bands, Dead Moon was formed by married couple Fred and Toody Cole with drummer Andrew Loomis. The band combined dark and frustrating themes with punk and country music influences into a stripped-down, monaural sound.

== Content ==
In the Graveyard is a garage punk album with energetic production. "Hey Joe", a standard, shows up in the album, as well as a Toody-covered "Can't Help Falling in Love" under a moody, darker atmosphere. As evident in the band's unusual sound by Dave Thomas, an Allmusic reporter, "Slight open-plain Western influences shine through in the album's more subdued moments, coming off like some strange home-schooled version of the 13th Floor Elevators playing covers in an empty cowboy bar."

== Release and critical reception ==
In the Graveyard was released in 1988 by Tombstone Records to generally positive reviews. According to an Allmusic review by Fred Thomas, "The rawness of Dead Moon's 1988 debut In the Graveyard is undeniable, its lo-fi production as much a part of the final product as its manic, seething energy."

Reissues of the album followed. In June 2014, In the Graveyard, along with Dead Moon's second and third studio albums, were released for the first time on CD. Exactly ten years later, the same albums were remastered on 24-bit high-resolution.

== Track listing ==
All tracks are produced and written by Fred Cole, except when noted

In the Graveyard track listing
No.	Title	Writer	Length
1.	"Graveyard"		2:32
2.	"Out on a Wire"		2:50
3.	"Can't Help Falling in Love"	Hugo Peretti; Luigi Creatore; George David Weiss	1:45
4.	"Parchment Farm"	Mose Allison	3:35
5.	"Dead in the Saddle"		3:43
6.	"Hey Joe"	Public Domain	2:57
7.	"Don't Burn the Fires"		3:30
8.	"Where Did I Go Wrong"		2:17
9.	"Remember Me"		2:54
10.	"I Hate the Blues"		2:34
Total length:			28:37

== Personnel ==
- Bass, Vocals – Toody Cole
- Drums – Andrew Loomis
- Guitar, Vocals – Fred Cole
- Cover – Kelly Manahan
- Engineer – John Lindahl (tracks: A1, A2, A4, B1, B3), Steve Parker (14) (tracks: A3, A5, B2, B4, B5)
- Photography By [Photo By] – Zorn
- Producer, Mastered By – Fred Cole
- Remastered By – Timothy Stolellenwerk
- Written By – Fred Cole (tracks: A1, A2, A5, B2 to B5)
- A1, A2, A4, B1, B3 Recorded at Fresh Tracks
- A3, A5, B2, B4, B5 Recorded at River Recordings
