= Sam Henry (musician) =

American drummer (1956–2022)

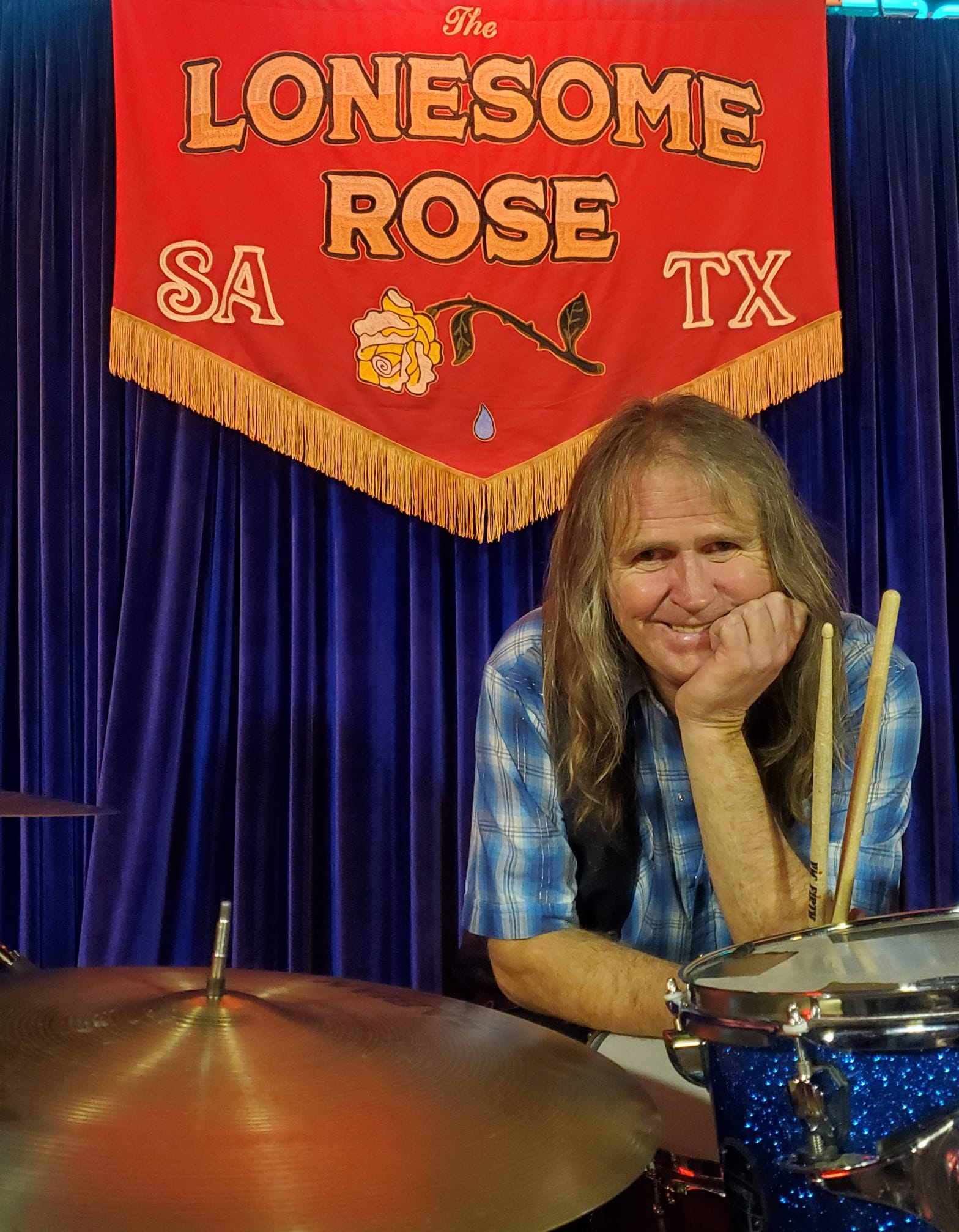
- Henry sitting at his drum set before a performance

Background information
- Born: Samuel William Henry; December 28, 1956; Oregon City, Oregon, U.S.
- Died: February 20, 2022 (aged 65) Portland, Oregon, U.S.
- Genres: Punk rock, post-punk
- Occupations: Musician; songwriter; record producer; multi-Instrumentalist; vocalist
- Instruments: Guitar; vocals; piano; organ; bass
- Years active: 1970–2022
- Formerly of: Wipers; The Rats; Napalm Beach; Jenny Don't and the Spurs; Don't

Samuel William Henry (December 28, 1956 – February 20, 2022), born legally blind, was an American drummer, best known for his work with the punk rock group Wipers. He was inducted into the Oregon Music Hall of Fame in 2011.

== Career ==
In addition to Wipers, other bands that Sam appeared in were The Rats, Napalm Beach, Poison Idea, Snow Bud & The Flower People, Jenny Don't and the Spurs, DON'T, and Morgan Grace. His early bands were a staple at Portland's legendary Satyricon. Though some may think of Sam as Portland's quintessential punk drummer, he also played funk with Shock, 1930s swing jazz with the Stolen Sweets and roots music with Michael Dean Damron, Sam also offered drum lessons to many up-and-coming musicians.

=== Wipers ===
Around age 19, Henry met Portland punk pioneer Greg Sage, who drafted Henry into his band, Hard Road. The two bonded over both being considered outcasts in school.

"He [Greg Sage] got picked on for being different because of his hair in school, and I got picked on my whole life for not being able to see."

After some time, Hard Road would turn into the Wipers, the Northwest punk band that would eventually influence everyone from Nirvana to Melvins. With Dave Koupal on bass, the trio played for a year or so together before moving to Cape Coral, Florida, and forming what then became the band the Wipers in 1977. According to Henry they had to move out of Portland because the insurgence of the 70's disco left them with no place to play. After moving out of Florida and back to Portland The band recorded and released their first two singles ("Better Off Dead" and "Alien Boy"), as well as their first full-length Is This Real?. After the recording of 1980's Is This Real?, The Wipers relocated to New York. The band was not well received there, so Henry decided to quit and come back home to Portland while the Wipers continued without him.

=== The Rats ===
In 1979 Henry left the Wipers and joined Fred Cole and his wife Toody Cole to play in the pre-Dead Moon band The Rats. He was also working at Fred and Toody's guitar shop called Captain Whizeagle's. In 1981 The Rats released the full-length album, Intermittent Signals, on Fred's label Whizeagle Records. Simultaneously, he joined Portland psychedelic grunge band Napalm Beach. When Cole learned of Henry joining another band he gave him an ultimatum: It's either the Rats or Napalm Beach. He chose the latter, and Cole fired him—from both jobs.

=== Napalm Beach ===
Henry was the drummer in The Rats until 1981 when he left the band and joined Chris Newman to play in Napalm Beach. Napalm Beach, was a staple of the scene that formed around the Portland club Satyricon in the early ’80s. Although charged with punk energy, Newman's guitar playing maintained elements of the heavy blues and psychedelic rock, which, along with his bellowing vocals, would influence the grunge sound that eventually emerged from the Pacific Northwest. Napalm Beach was Henry's longest running band, playing their final show on Sam's 60th birthday.

=== Don't ===
In 2009 Henry formed the Portland band "Don't" with Jenny Don't, Dan Lowinger, and David Minick. The group released two full-length LPs, "Away, Away" and "Fever Dreams, including multiple 45's on Kelly Halliburton's label "Doomtown Sounds", one single on the Long Island label "Dead Broke Rekerds", and a single on the German label "Twisted Chords". The Full length, Fever Dreams, came out on the German label "Rockstar "Records and Doomtown Sounds". Don't went on tour with Pierced Arrows as direct support for two U.S. tours in 2011 and 2012 and toured Europe in 2013.

=== Jenny Don't and the Spurs ===
In 2012 Jenny Don't and Kelly Halliburton formed the roots/alt-country band Jenny Don't and the Spurs with Sam Henry on drums. The trio released their first single on Fred Cole's label Tombstone Records.

== Death ==
After completing a two-week tour with Jenny Don't and the Spurs throughout California, Henry fell ill while still out on the road. The band canceled their last show in Washington state and drove back to Portland where he was admitted to the emergency room. Two weeks later Sam died from complications of stomach cancer on February 20, 2022, at the age of 65.

== Discography ==
Wipers Discography

- Better Off Dead (1978)
- Alien Boy (1980)
- Is This Real (1980)
- Best Of Wipers And Greg Sage (1990)
- Wipers Box Set (Is This Real? - Youth Of America - Over The Edge) (2001)
- Out Takes (2010)

The Rats Discography

- Intermittent Signals (1981)

Napalm Beach Discography

- Live (1983)
- Pugsly (1984)
- Rock & Roll Hell (1984)
- Teen Dream (1985)
- Moving To And Fro (1988)
- Liquid Love (1988)
- Thunder Lizard (1991)
- Last Big Heartache (1992)
- Curiosities (1993)
- In My Tree (1995)
- Kill For My Bitch Live: Portland & Seattle 2008 (2008)

Poison Idea Discography

- Jeff Dahl And Poison Idea – Dead Boy (1992) (Keys)
- Pajama Party (1992) (Keys)
- We Must Burn (1993) (Keys)
- Pig's Last Stand (1996) (Organ)
- Blank, Blackout, Vacant (2020) (Organ)
- Jerry A. Lang – From The Fire Into The Water (2022) (Drums)

Snow Bud And The Flower People Discography

- Snow Bud And The Flower People (1986) (Bass)
- The Heart Is A Lonely Hunter (1990) (Bass)
- Bonghit / Cryin' Time Is Over (1992) (Organ)
- Ripped Van Stinkle (1994) (Keys)
- Holy Smoke (2002) (Piano)

DON'T Discography

- Away Away (2010)
- Fever Dreams (2016)
- Love Lost / Killing Me (2011)
- You Keep Cutting Through (2013)
- "89 / Dead End Drive" (2014)
- "Fire Of Love / Too Young" (2014)
- "Enough Is Enough / How It's Gonna Be" (2017)

Jenny Don't And The Spurs Discography

- Self Titled (2015)
- Call Of The Road (2017)
- Fire On The Ridge (2021)
- Lovesick Crawl (2023)
- The Singles Roundup (2023)
- "No Good / You Win Again" (2013)
- "Trouble With The Law / My Blue Heart" (2014)
- "A Western Holiday" (2017)
- "What Can I Do / Still As The Night" (2018)
- "Right From The Start / Three Or Four Nights" (2019)
- "Paso Del Norte / Honky Tonk Fool" (2019)
- "Mr. Fire Eyes (2020)
- "California Cowboy / Mr. Fire Eyes" (2022)
- "Live In Bonn" (2017)

Other Credits

- Rex Putnam High School Band – Rex Putnam High School Bands In Concert (1975) (Drums)
- The Dameans – Sing Out His Goodness: 12 Selections From The Early Dameans (1979) (Keys)
- Aaron Neville – Orchid In The Storm (1985) (Keys)
- The Fingers Of Doom – White Gods (1988) (Drums)
- S.W.A.T. – Deep Inside A Cop's Mind (1994) (Organ)
- The Tards – Pissed You In The River (1995) (Organ)
- The Boyd Rice Experience – Hatesville! (1995) (Keys)
- Cheralee Dillon – Citron (1995) (Drums)
- Tards – Rubber Room (1996) (Organ)
- Adam Parfrey – A Sordid Evening Of Sonic Sorrows (1997) (Organ)
- Wardell Quezergue's Slammin' Big Band – Maestropiece (2000) (Piano)
- Gothic Outhouse – Gothic Outhouse (2004) (Drums)
- Morgan Grace – The Sound Of Something Breaking (2005) (Drums)
- The Stolen Sweets – Shuffle Off To Buffalo (2006) (Drums)
- Heidi Hellbender – Come Home (2006) (Drums)
- Michael Dean Damron & Thee Loyal Bastards – Bad Days Ahead (2008) (Drums)
- Morgan Grace – Valentine (2008) (Drums)
- Drunken Prayer – Drunken Prayer with Sam Henry (2009) (Drums)
- P.R.O.B.L.E.M.S. – Make It Through The Night (2012) (Keys)
- Witch Mountain – Mobile Of Angels (2014) (Organ)
- Fetish – World Eater (2019) (Piano)
- Fathoms – Dead Man's Cove / Surfin' The Fear (2021) (Drums)
- The Misery Men – Devillusion (2021) (Drums)
- Desolate Rose – Night Zero b/w Complicated Now (2022) (Piano)
