= Teenbeat Club =

Nightclub in Paradise, Nevada, U.S.

Coordinates: 36.10947°N 115.15201°W

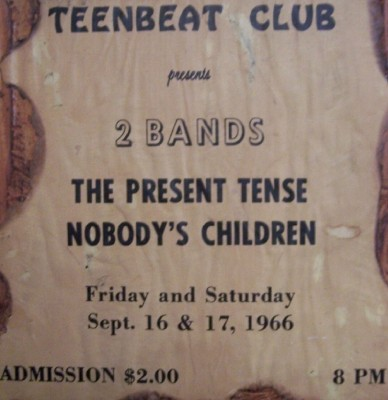
1966 promotional handbill.

The Teenbeat Club was a nightclub in Paradise, Nevada, believed to be the first in the U.S. that catered exclusively to teenagers. Located at 4416 Paradise Road, it was opened in 1962 by Steve Miller and Keith Austin, both 19 at the time and Las Vegas High School graduates, where they had been members of the 1962 Las Vegas High School Broadcasting Club. The club's marquee was built by a Las Vegas neon sign maker, Bill Gulbranson. The Teenbeat Club ceased operation in 1968. The original building still stands, now as an adult topless cabaret.

Miller was later a Las Vegas City Council member from 1987 to 1991, and was inducted by the Nevada Broadcasters Association into the Nevada Broadcasters Hall of Fame in 1998. Austin relocated to Santa Barbara, California, where he continues his career in the recording industry as the executive producer and host of the Rock Files.

== The Teenbeats ==
The club grew out of the weekend dance concerts Miller and Austin promoted starting in 1961, featuring live KLAS Radio broadcasts from the Knights of Columbus Hall and the National Guard Armory in Downtown Las Vegas. The broadcasts featured the Teenbeats (formerly known as the Checkmates), a local, surf music-influenced band. When the Teenbeat Club opened the Teenbeats (alternately spelled "Teen Beats" and "Teen-Beats") were the house band, featuring vocalist and rhythm guitarist Don Frassa, lead guitarist Larry Chernoff, bassist Lyle Smith, drummer Gary Karr, and Jim Logue on tenor sax. Elliot Lieb had played drums for the Checkmates and the Teenbeats prior to Gary Karr joining the group.

In 1961 and 1962, the Teenbeats recorded two 45 RPM records: their first as the "Nevegan's" on the X-P-A-N-D-E-D label (Downey Records), titled "Russian Roulette" b/w "One Armed Bandit" (X-101); and their second as "The Teen-Beats" on Chollie Wright's Las Vegas Strip Records (which was located at 416 W. Bonanza, Las Vegas), titled "Live Like a King" (written by Chernoff) b/w "Mystified" (S-102), featuring Don Frassa on vocals and guitar. A third record, "Surf Bound" b/w "Mr. Moto", was recorded as "The Teenbeats" on Teenbeat Records in 1962.

An LP compilation album of the 1962 KLAS Radio broadcasts, Surf Bound, was released on Norton Records in 1991. The Teenbeats/Teen-Beats/Nevegan's three 45 RPM records' labels are shown on the cover jacket.

== Teenbeat Records ==
Miller and Austin co-produced 45 RPM singles from 1962 to 1966, first pressing them with the "Teenbeat Records" label and in 1966, with the "Teenbeat Club Records" label. In 1962, Teenbeat Records was located at 109 S. 3rd St., Suite 302, Las Vegas.

The first Teenbeat Records single was recorded in 1962 by the Teenbeats, titled "Surf Bound", and written by Larry Chernoff. In 1966, Miller and Austin co-produced two other 45 RPM singles on Teenbeat Club Records: "It's Your Time" backed with "Little Girl" (TB 1006) (listed as one top 100 rarest 45 RPM singles) by The Weeds, a local Las Vegas band; and a cover of the Rolling Stones' "Get Off of My Cloud" backed with "Red Roses For A Blue Lady" (TB 1004) featuring Charlie White Eagle, with musical accompaniment and background vocals by The Weeds.

In the mid-1960s, three LP albums were recorded live at the Teenbeat Club on La Brea/Sutton Records: The Goldtones, Live! At The Teenbeat Club In Las Vegas! (LS 8011), featuring Randy Seol, Wayne Purvis, Ken Naylor, Al Doss, Mike Peters, Steve Green and Cindy Mac; The Starfires, Teenbeat A Go Go (LS 8018), featuring Chuck Butler, Dave Anderson, Jack Emerick, Freddy Fields and Sonny Lathrop; and The Sentinals, Vegas Go Go (SSU 338).

== Regular performers ==
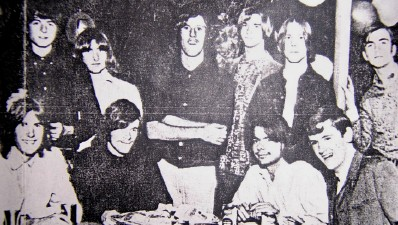
The Weeds and Scatter Blues Together, Las Vegas, 1966. Weeds' 18 year lead vocalist Fred Cole, second row, far left, standing next to Weeds' Ed Bowen, guitarist. Scatter Blues' Bill Rosevear, lead vocalist and guitarist, center; Scatter Blues' Piers Munro, vocals and harmonica, seated to his immediate right; and Rich Lowery, drummer, to Rosevear's left. Photograph by Janie Greenspun, 1966

The Lords, a local rhythm & blues band featuring Fred Cole sharing lead vocals with electric organist Hans Grebner (Johnny the German) and guitarist John Acquina, played the Teenbeat Club frequently in 1964 and 1965, as did the Coachmen, featuring lead vocalist, pianist and saxophonist Michael Wesley Dean, guitarist Matt Hyde, guitarist Jay Donnellan, bassist Terry Johnson and drummer James Kehn.

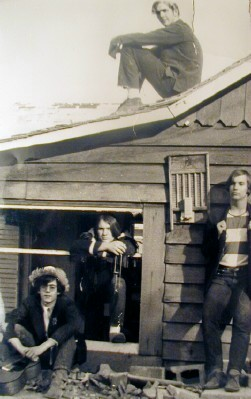
Sioux Uprising Publicity Photo featuring (l to r) Gregory A. Waller, Steve Armstead, Michael Murray and Scott Wolfe (top), Las Vegas, 1966, photo by Glenn Wheeler

The Weeds were frequent performers at the Teenbeat Club from 1965 through 1966, featuring Fred Cole, a vocalist, guitarist and songwriter, who later gained success in the Portland-based bands King Bee, Zipper, The Rats, Dead Moon and Pierced Arrows. Other members of The Weeds were lead guitarist Ed Bowen, rhythm guitarists Ron Buzzell and Dennis Wynne, bassist Bob Atkins, and drummer Tim Rockson.

The years 1966 and 1967 saw a renaissance of local Las Vegas electric rock, folk rock and blues bands in the Las Vegas Valley. Scatter Blues played the Teenbeat Club regularly which featured vocalist and blues harpist Piers Munro, vocalist and rhythm guitarist Bill Rosevear, rhythm guitarist Jerry Lyman, bassists Scott Devitte, Brent Alverson and Bob Lucero; and drummer Rich Lowrey.

Other frequently appearing local bands appearing at the Teenbeat Club in the mid-1960s were the Present Tense, featuring vocalist Christopher Michael Hallman, bassist Michael P. Selinsky, lead guitarist Bob Lilley, Jr., rhythm guitarist John McDonnell, electric pianist Dennis Prell, and drummers John Baker and Jim Gannon; Sioux Uprising, featuring lead vocalist and guitarist Gregory Albert Waller, bassist Steve Armstead, guitarist Michael Murray and drummer Scott Wolfe; Nobody's Children featuring Joe Spitale, Enrique Corro, Greg McKenzie, Danny Bolling, Danny Harlow, Charlie Perri and Jay Painter; and Misty Souls Ray Campbell, Barry Bernier, Chris Riecke, Kerry Klein and Frank Faruch were other Las Vegas regulars to play the Teenbeat Club during this time period.

The Little People (featuring Mike Lyman, Steve Harvey, Mike Friedman, Glenn Cooper, and Howie Salstein), London Fog (featuring Bob Lilley Jr., Mike Lyman, Mike Friedman, Mark Leonard, Jessica Kluger Marciel, and Georgiann Rock), and the Free Circus (featuring Jessica Kluger Marciel, Roby Bennett, Danny Barnett, Bob Bjornsen and Larry Gann) performed in the final year of the Teenbeat Club, 1968.

== Other bands ==
Southern California surf rock bands which played at the Teenbeat Club in the early 1960s included the Marketts, the Lively Ones, the Routers, the Challengers and the Chevells. The Templars appeared in two International Scout advertisements taken in front of the Teenbeat Club marquee.

Notable Los Angeles bands which played at the Teenbeat Club included Love with Arthur Lee (with Scatter Blues as their opening act, December 31, 1967), the Peanut Butter Conspiracy (December 29-31, 1967), and Hamilton Streetcar. The Standells also performed in 1966.

Cleveland band the Outsiders appeared at the club. The Bitter Sweets of Vancouver, British Columbia, Canada, also appeared in the mid-1960s.

== Battle of the Bands ==
The Teenbeat Club sponsored Battles of the Bands in 1966 and 1967. The 1966 Battle featured Scatter Blues, The Weeds, Present Tense and Nobody's Children, and was won by Scatter Blues in audience balloting. The 1967 Battle, between fourteen local bands (The Association of Sound, Blues Print, Calico Blues Band, Curtains of Grey, The Glass Door, Living End, The Moors, Nazz, The Neighborhood Kids, The New Breed, Nobody's Children, The Nomads, The Green Mountain Strawberry Patch, The Loved Ones, and The Wurds) was won by the Calico Blues Band, with guitarist Vaughn Thomas Munshower, organist Scott Devitte, bass guitarist Mike Badik, vocalist Gary Meridith and drummer Russell King. Munshower and Devitte later won Emmy Awards for Camerawork and Technical Lighting Direction, respectively.

== Television show ==
From 1962 to 1966, Miller and Austin hosted the Teen Beat Club television show on KLAS-TV, Channel 8, that included live weekly interviews and dancing, patterned after Dick Clark's American Bandstand. The live broadcasts, held on the Saturday afternoon time-slot, featured such guest artists as Frankie Avalon, the Beach Boys, Dorsey Burnette, Vic Dana, Dick and Dee Dee, Little Richard, Trini Lopez, Wayne Newton, Paul Revere and the Raiders, the Shillings, Keely Smith, Bobby Vee, Bobby Vinton and Timi Yuro

== Dance concerts ==
From 1963 through 1968, Miller and Austin also promoted dance concerts held at the Las Vegas Convention Center that featured the Beach Boys, Sonny Charles and The Checkmates, Ltd., Dick and Dee Dee, Jackie DeShannon, Tom Jones, Lou Rawls, Bobby Rydell, Neil Sedaka, the Surfaris, Three Dog Night and Bobby Vinton. They also co-promoted the first Las Vegas appearances of the Grateful Dead and Santana at the Las Vegas Ice Palace on March 29, 1969.

== See also ==
- List of television shows set in Las Vegas
