= The Rats (American band) =

American garage punk band

- Also known as: The Desperate Edge
- Origin: Portland, Oregon, United States
- Genres: Garage punk
- Years active: 1980–1984
- Past members: Fred Cole; Toody Cole; Rod Hibbert; Sam Henry; Louis Samora

The Rats were an American garage punk band from Portland, Oregon, formed by Fred Cole previously of the garage rock band, The Lollipop Shoppe. Cole played guitar and sang, his wife, Toody Cole played bass and sang, and initially Rod Rat (Rod Hibbert) played drums. Their sound was described as a raw mix of punk rock with occasional country touches.

Their self-titled debut album appeared on Cole's Whizeagle label in 1980. Afterward, Rod Rat departed from the band, and died by suicide. (Prior to his suicide Rod Rat also played drums in 1980-81 for Portland power pop band Domino Theory).

Sam Henry, formerly of the Wipers, played drums on this LP but left to join another Portland band, Napalm Beach.

Louis Samora took over the drumming duties for the band's 1983 album "In a Desperate Red," which was also released under the Whizeagle label. However, he departed from the band in 1984 to focus on his rockabilly group, The Jackals.

After The Rats disbanded in 1984 Bill Barker of Profile Studios in Vancouver, British Columbia convinced the band to reunite for a single. It appeared under the band name The Desperate Edge later in 1984.

Soon after, Cole assembled a country band, Western Front, and he and Toody later reunited in Dead Moon.

In 2008, Portland's Mississippi Records reissued the first album on vinyl.

The two-part song "The Rat's Revenge" - which appeared on the 1983 compilation Back from the Grave - was performed (some 15 years prior) by a different band under the same name.
