= Death Wish Kids =

Death Wish Kids may refer to:

- Death Wish Kids, previous band of Pretty Girls Make Graves members Andrea Zollo and Derek Fudesco
- "Death Wish Kids", song by Poison Idea from Kings of Punk, covered by Pass Out Kings on We Claim Victory
