= Pebbles, Volume 8 =

Pebbles, Volume 8 may refer to:

- Pebbles, Volume 8 (1980 album)
- Pebbles, Volume 8 (1996 album)
