= Andrew Loomis (drummer) =

American drummer (1961–2016)

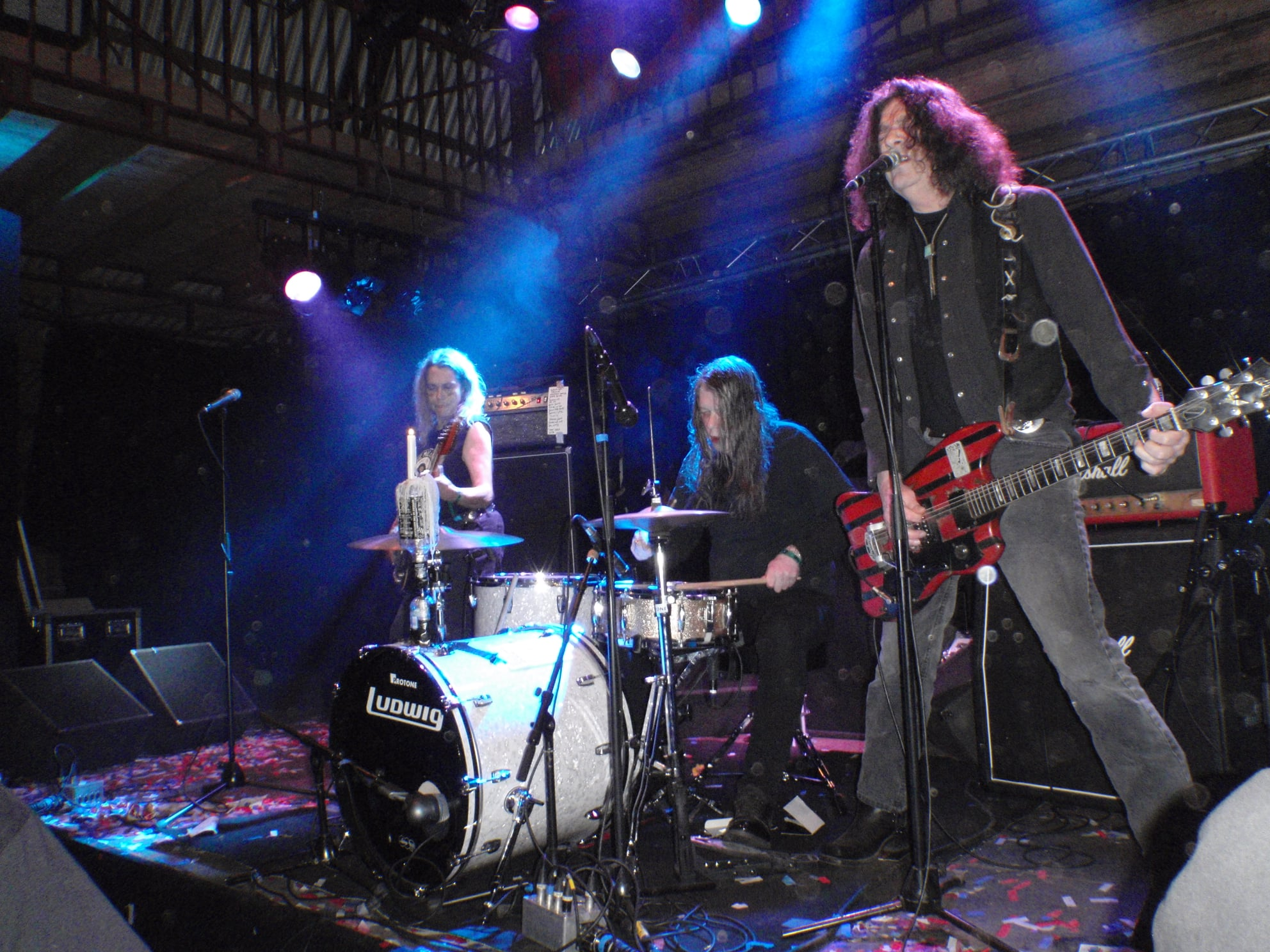
- Dead Moon performing live in 2015; from left to right: Toody Cole, Andrew Loomis, and Fred Cole

Background information
- Born: Andrew Brian Loomis; November 17, 1961
- Died: March 8, 2016 (aged 54) Portland, Oregon, U.S.
- Genres: Garage rock, punk rock
- Occupation: Musician
- Instrument: Drums
- Years active: 1980s–2015
- Formerly of: Dead Moon

Andrew Brian Loomis (November 17, 1961 – March 8, 2016) was an American drummer best known as a founding member of the Portland, Oregon garage-punk band Dead Moon. He played with the group for nearly three decades and became a central figure in the Pacific Northwest underground rock scene.

== Career ==
In 1987 Loomis joined guitarist and singer Fred Cole and bassist Toody Cole to form Dead Moon. The trio became known for their raw, lo-fi sound, strict DIY ethic, and extensive touring in the United States and Europe. Loomis's drumming—minimalist, driving, and rooted in garage-rock tradition—formed a key part of the band’s signature sound.

Dead Moon released numerous studio and live albums between 1988 and 2006, all featuring Loomis. The band became a cult favorite, particularly in Europe, and influenced later generations of garage-punk and independent rock bands. After Dead Moon’s initial dissolution in 2006, Loomis occasionally played in other Portland projects and participated in Dead Moon’s brief reunion activities in 2014–2015.

== Illness and death ==
Loomis was diagnosed with lymphoma in 2015 and withdrew from touring while undergoing treatment. Members of the music community organized benefit efforts to help cover medical expenses. He died on March 8, 2016, at Providence Portland Medical Center at age 54.

== Selected discography ==
With Dead Moon:

- In the Graveyard (1988)
- Unknown Passage (1989)
- Defiance (1990)
- Stranded in the Mystery Zone (1991)
- Nervous Sooner Changes (1992)
- Destination X (1999)
- Dead Ahead (2004)
