= Kelly Halliburton =

American musician

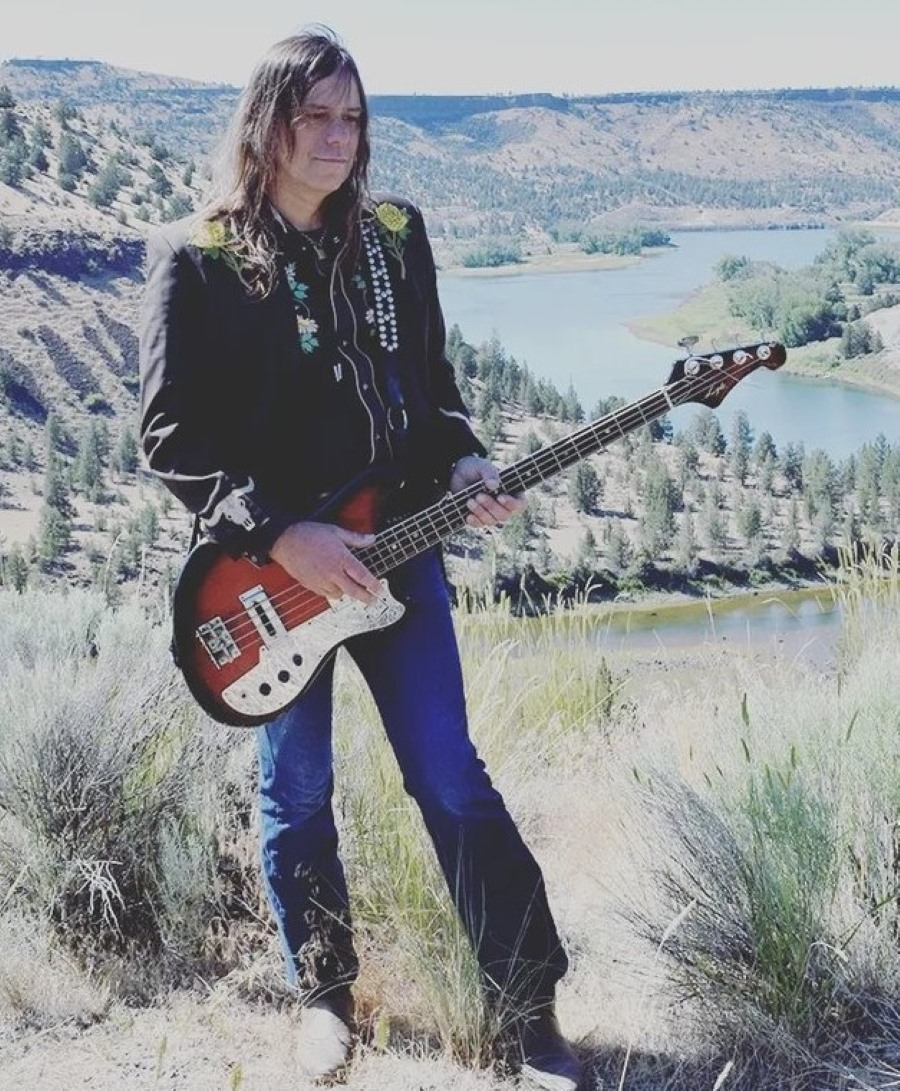

Background information
- Born: Kelly Michael Halliburton; January 17, 1971 (age 55); Portland, Oregon, U.S.
- Genres: Punk; Cowpunk; Garage; Anarcho Punk; Hardcore
- Occupations: Musician; Songwriter
- Instruments: Bass; Drums; Guitar
- Years active: 1985–present
- Labels: Doomtown Sounds; Consensus Reality; Tombstone; Fluff and Gravy; Vice; Rockstar Records; Twisted Chord; Profane Existence; Ebullition; Skuld
- Member of: Jenny Don't and the Spurs; Toody Cole and her band
- Formerly of: Resist; Detestation; Defiance; Pierced Arrows; Dead Moon; P.R.O.B.L.E.M.S.
- Spouse: Jenny Don't (m. 2022)

Kelly Michael Halliburton (born January 17, 1971) is an American bassist and drummer. He has been involved in bands including Pierced Arrows, Dead Moon, Detestation, Defiance, and Jenny Don't and the Spurs.

== Musical career ==
Kelly Halliburton began his musical career in the late '80s in Portland, Oregon, joining several bands associated with the anarcho-punk scene, including Resist, and Deprived. He later co-founded other prominent Portland punk bands Defiance, Masskontroll, and Detestation. His involvement reflected a dissatisfaction with the late-'80s Portland music scene, particularly the fusion of punk with heavy metal and funk metal

In 1992, Resist embarked on their first European tour.

In 1995 Halliburton founded Detestation, an American hardcore punk/crust band with female vocals. The band disbanded around 1998. Halliburton decided to settle in Germany at the conclusion of their European tour.

While living in Germany Halliburton joined Cluster Bomb Unit as a bass player, later transitioning to guitar, and also played drums in the German band Murder Disco X. His residency was primarily in Ludwigsburg during this period. Additionally, Halliburton was a member of the hardcore band Severed Head Of State. Despite the band members living in various places throughout the US, they frequently flew to meet each other for recording and touring.

March 2007, following the disbandment of Dead Moon, Fred and Toody Cole approached Halliburton, offering him the position of drummer in their new project, Pierced Arrows. Despite primarily being a bass player with limited drumming experience, he accepted the offer. Pierced Arrows released two full-length albums and five singles and toured extensively until Fred's health began to decline around 2016.

In an attempt to deviate away from the musical styles of the more hardcore - anarcho punk from his earlier previous projects, Halliburton started P.R.O.B.L.E.M.S. in 2009. Notable members include Dean Johnson (Poison Idea), Everclear percussionist Brian Lehfeldt, Wiper's drummer Sam Henry, Wade Murff, who later drummed in American horror punk band Doyle, and former child actor Jonny P. Jewells.

P.R.O.B.L.E.M.S disbanded when Jewells committed suicide January 1, 2018.

In 2011, Halliburton and partner, Jenny Don't, formed the western band Jenny Don't and the Spurs. They enlisted drummer Sam Henry, originally of the Wipers. They continue to tour worldwide as of 2026.

In 2026, Kelly was inducted into the Oregon Music Hall of Fame in recognition of his contributions to Oregon's music scene. Throughout the year, he continues to tour with Jenny Don't and also tours full-time as the drummer for Toody Cole & Her Band.

== Record labels ==
Consensus Reality: Halliburton founded Consensus Reality, a record label that released records for bands such as, Detestation, Defiance, Resist, and various underground DIY anarcho-punk acts. Halliburton relocated to Germany in 1999, leading to the cessation of Consensus Reality's operation.

In 2010, Kelly Halliburton founded Doomtown Sounds.

== Equipment ==
Kelly Halliburton has predominantly played a 1979 Fender Precision Bass. In addition to his Fender Precision Bass, he occasionally incorporates vintage guitars from various countries, including Japan, Brazil (Gianinni), Czechoslovakia (Jolana), and Yugoslavia (Melodija), into his performances.

== Personal life ==
On August 21, 2022, Kelly Halliburton and Jenny Don't were married after already being together for 13 years. The wedding ceremony was officiated by Jerry A., singer of the Portland Hardcore band Poison Idea.

== Bands ==
=== Full list of bands ===
- Axiom
- Burning Leather
- Celebrity Graves
- Cluster Bomb Unit
- Dead Moon
- Defiance
- Deprived
- Detestation
- Don't
- Endrophobia
- Fathoms
- Final Massakre
- Holocausto Pomada
- Jenny Don't And The Spurs
- Masskontroll
- Murder Disco Experience
- P.R.O.B.L.E.M.S.
- Pierced Arrows
- Resist
- Severed Head Of State
- Suicide Blitz
- War Machine
- 16 Volt

== Discography (limited) ==
=== Pierced Arrows ===
- 2007 - In My Brain / Caroline (7" single)
- 2008 - Paranoia / Ain't Life Strange (7" single)
- 2008 - Straight To The Heart
- 2010 - Descending Shadows
- 2011 - Keep Pushin' / Little Did I Know (7" single)
- 2014 - This Is The Day B/W Zip My Lip (2014)

=== P.R.O.B.L.E.M.S ===
- 2009 - Gotta Get Away From You (7" single)
- 2009 - Gotta Get Away From You (7" single)
- 2010 - Sweet Little Thing / I Got Nothin' (7" single)
- 2011 - Make It Through The Night
- 2011 - Cold Cold Rain
- 2011 - Buzz Off / It Don't Have To Be Like This (7" single)
- 2012 - I Hate TV / Oops (7" single)
- 2014 - Hit And Run / 45 Minutes (7" single)
- 2015 - Another Day
- 2017 - Doomtown Shakes
- 2017 - Enemy / Spy (7" single)

=== Defiance ===
- 1995 - Burn (Ep)
- 1995 - European Tour (7" single)
- 1996 - Ep's Of Defiance (Singles compilation)
- 1996 - No Future No Hope
- 2010 - Johnny Was A Soldier
- 2011 - Out Of Order

=== Detestation ===
- 1996 - Unheard Cries
- 1996 - The Inhuman Condition
- 1998 - Detestation
- 1998 - A Big White Pat On The Back (7" single)
- 1998 - Blood Of The Gods (7"single)

=== Resist ===
- 1991 - Resist
- 1991 - The Solution... ...Revolution!
- 1991 - Liberation
- 1991 - Suppression With Violence (Cassette)

=== Severed Head Of State ===
- 1999 - Severed Head Of State
- 2000 - Jedem Das Seine (7" single)
- 2001 - An Invitation To A Beheading
- 2001 - No Love Lost (7" single)
- 1998 - Anathema Device
- 2004 - Charge Ahead
- 2005 - Fucking Butchery
- 2007 - Power Hazard (E.P.)
