= Blank Blackout Vacant =

Studio album by Poison Idea
- Released: 1992
- Recorded: July–August 1991
- Genre: Hardcore punk
- Length: 33:05
- Label: Taang!

Poison Idea chronology
Feel the Darkness (1990)	Blank Blackout Vacant (1992)	Religion & Politics (1993)

Blank Blackout Vacant is the fourth studio album by Poison Idea. It was released in 1992 by Vinyl Solution in the UK and Taang! Records in the US. An expanded double LP version was released by TKO Records and the band's American Leather Records in 2020

== Critical reception ==
Professional ratings
Review scores
Source	Rating
AllMusic	4/5 stars
The Encyclopedia of Popular Music	3/5 stars

Trouser Press wrote that "there’s evidence of some technical progression: 'Star of Baghdad' is shot through with aggro-surf guitar soloing, and a cover of 'Vietnamese Baby' struts with the glammy cheekiness of the New York Dolls’ original." Ox-Fanzine called the album "the climax in terms of melody, aggression and pressure," writing: "Anger and bitterness instead of brutality. Thematically there is a great harbor tour through human misery: suicide, child and drug abuse, broken relationships, war. Here one looks deep into the abyss and somehow endures it."

== Track listing ==
Original release

1. "Say Goodbye" (Jerry A.)
2. "Star of Baghdad" (Jerry A., Mondo, Pig Champion, Thee Slayer Hippy)
3. "Icepicks at Dawn" (Jerry A., Myrtle Tickner)
4. "Smack Attack" (Jerry A. Thee Slayer Hippy)
5. "Forever and Always" (Jerry A., Mondo, Pig Champion)
6. "Punish Me" (Jerry A., Mondo, Myrtle Tickner, Pig Champion)
7. "Crippled Angel" (Jerry A.)
8. "What Happened to Sunday" (Jerry A., Mondo)
9. "You're Next" (Jerry A., Myrtle Tickner)
10. "Drain" (Jerry A.)
11. "Brigandage" (Jerry A., Myrtle Tickner)
12. "Amy's Theme" (Pig Champion)
13. "Vietnamese Baby" (David Johansen)

2020 expanded edition bonus tracks

1. "Mario the Cop" (Pig Champion)
2. "Open Your Eyes" (Brian James, Stiv Bators)
3. "Flamethrower Love" (Jimmy Zero, Stiv Bators)
4. "Endless Sleep" (Delores Nance, Jody Reynolds)
5. "Doctor, Doctor" (John Entwistle)
6. "Green Onions" (Al Jackson Jr., Booker T. Jones, Lewie Steinberg, Steve Cropper)
7. "Feel the Darkness (live)" (Jerry A.)
8. "Crippled Angel (live)" (Jerry A.)
9. "Drain (live)" (Jerry A.)
10. "Alan's on Fire (live)" (Jerry A.)

== Personnel ==
- Jerry A. - Vocals
- Tom "Pig Champion" Roberts - Guitar, Recorder, Background vocals
- Myrtle Tickner - Bass, Harmonica, Background vocals
- Thee Slayer Hippy - Drums, Percussion, Background vocals
- Mondo - Guitar, Piano, Bass on "Mario the Cop"
- Bob Stark - Engineer, Piano, Keyboards
- Dave Hite - Saxophone on "Say Goodbye", "Forever and Always" and "Amy's Theme"
- Phil Irwin - Saxophone on "Amy's Theme"
- Jeff Dahl - Special Guest Vocals on "Flamethrower Love"
- Sam Henry - Organ on live tracks
