= Think Fast =

Think Fast may refer to:

== Quiz shows ==
- Think Fast (1949 game show), an early show on the ABC network
- Think Fast (1989 game show), a children's quiz show on the Nickelodeon network

== Music ==
- "Think Fast", a song by Crazy Town from the album The Gift of Game
- "Think Fast", a song by All Too Much from the soundtrack for Clerks II
- "Think Fast", a song by Poison Idea from the album Pick Your King, 1983
- Think Fast! Records

== Books ==
- Think Fast: Mental Toughness Training for Runners, book by Joe Henderson, 1991
- Think Fast!, book by Thom Hartmann and Jane Bowman, 1996
- Think Fast: An Introduction to Present-Time Composition, in Researching Improvisation, book by Alan Bern, 2016

== Others ==
- "Think Fast" (The Flash), an episode of The Flash
- Disney Think Fast, a video game
- Think Fast!, the billing name for the boxing match Fernando Montiel vs. Nonito Donaire, 2011

== See also ==
- Think Fast, Mr. Moto, a 1936 film
- "Think Fast, Father Ted," an episode of Father Ted
- Thinking, Fast and Slow, book by Daniel Kahneman
