= War All the Time =

War All the Time may refer to:

- War All the Time (Thursday album), 2003
  - "War All the Time" (song), the title track
- War All the Time (Poison Idea album), 1987
- War All the Time, a poetry collection by Charles Bukowski
