= Just Colour =

Studio album by The Lollipop Shoppe
- Released: 1968
- Recorded: 1967–1968
- Genre: Psychedelic rock, garage rock
- Length: 44:48
- Label: Uni
- Producer: Lord Tim Hudson

Just Colour is a 1968 album by the American garage rock band The Lollipop Shoppe, released via Uni Records. Just Colour is the only official studio album released by the group. "You Must Be a Witch" was included in the Nuggets compilation reissue in 1998.

== Track listing ==
All tracks written by Fred Cole and Bob Atkins unless otherwise noted.

1. "You Must Be a Witch" (Cole) – 2:40
2. "Underground Railroad" (Cole, Ron Buzzel) – 7:45
3. "Baby Don't Go" – 2:50
4. "Who'll Read the Will" – 2:30
5. "It's Only a Reflection" (Ed Bowen) – 3:00
6. "Don't Look Back" (Cole) – 2:35
7. "Don't Close the Door on Me" (Cole, Buzzel) – 4:20
8. "It Ain't How Long" (Cole, Bowen) – 2:36
9. "It's Makin' It" (Cole, Bowen) – 2:25
10. "I'm Gonna Be There" – 2:40
11. "You Don't Give Me No More" – 2:17
12. "Sin" (Cole) – 2:20

=== 1998 CD bonus tracks ===
1. "Someone I Know" (Cole, Buzzel) – 4:08
2. "Through My Window" (Cole, Buzzel) – 2:38
3. "Mr. Madison Avenue Stop" – 2:34
4. "Who's It Gonna Be" (Cole) – 2:28

== Personnel ==
- Fred Cole (Lead Vocals)
- Bob Atkins (Bass Guitar)
- Ed Bowen (Lead Guitar, Backing Vocals)
- Ron Buzzel (Rhythm Guitar, Backing Vocals)
- Tim Rockson (Drums)
- John Lee Greek (credited as John "The Greek", Organ, Piano)
- Carl Fortina (Accordion)
- Danielle Mauroy (Producer)
