= Sam Henry =

Sam Henry may refer to:

- Sam Henry (musicologist) (1878–1952), Irish collector of folk songs
- Sam Henry (musician) (1956–2022), American drummer, member of The Wipers
- Samuel Henry (1920–2004), Canadian ice hockey player
