= Morgan Grace =

Morgan Grace may refer to:

- Morgan Grace (politician) (1837–1903), New Zealand politician and surgeon
- Morgan Grace (musician), American songwriter and singer
