= Pebbles, Volume 7 =

Pebbles, Volume 7 may refer to:

- Pebbles, Volume 7 (1994 album)
- Pebbles, Volume 7 (1980 album)
