= Morgan Grace (musician) =

American musician

Morgan Grace is an American singer-songwriter of rock music who has been active in the music scene in Portland, Oregon. In 2006, she won American Idol Underground with her song "The Rules of Dating". In 2008, she released her solo album Valentine. In 2009, she was named Best New Artist at the 2009 Portland Music Awards. She has also worked as a long-haul truck driver.

== Career ==
Mostly a solo acoustic performer, she released her first album, The Rules of Dating in 2003 on Lady Lush Records. In 2004, she joined up with former Wipers and Napalm Beach drummer Sam Henry. The two recorded and co-produced the multi-genre spanning album The Sound of Something Breaking in 2005.

She gained greater notoriety in August 2006 when her song "The Rules of Dating" won first prize in a songwriting contest at American Idol Underground, an online version of American Idol which caters to independent bands and songwriters and offers no promise of major label affiliation like the TV version does.
