= Feel the Darkness =

Studio album by Poison Idea
- Released: 1990
- Genre: Hardcore punk
- Length: 39:23
- Label: American Leather

Poison Idea chronology
Get Loaded and Fuck (1988)	Feel the Darkness (1990)	Blank Blackout Vacant (1992)

Professional ratings
Review scores
Source	Rating
AllMusic	4.5/5 stars

Feel the Darkness is an album released by the American hardcore punk band Poison Idea in 1990 as a joint release between Vinyl Solution and the band's own American Leather Records. The album has subsequently been reissued by a number of different record labels. It is the first album to feature bassist Myrtle Tickner and the only album to feature guitarist Aldine Strycnine. The song "Discontent", which was issued as 7" in 1990, does not appear on the original vinyl pressing of the album but has subsequently appeared on most CD versions. A limited 2004 vinyl reissue includes the Discontent 7" as a bonus. In 2018, a double LP expanded version of the album was released that includes various singles, cover songs, and alternate mixes.

The album cover is taken from back cover of God Bless Tiny Tim, edited to point a handgun to Tiny Tim's head. The 1995 CD reissue on Tim/Kerr removed Tiny Tim from the cover.

== Legacy ==
Kurt Cobain of Nirvana had a hard-shelled guitar case which featured a flyer of the album on it. Gayle Forman's I Was Here features the album cover decorating a character's bedroom door. The track "The Badge" was covered by Pantera as part of The Crow soundtrack, as well as a B-side on their singles "5 Minutes Alone" and "Planet Caravan", and as a bonus track on the Japanese version of the 1994 album Far Beyond Driven. Machine Head covered the track "Alan's on Fire" as a bonus track on the digipak version of their 1994 album Burn My Eyes.

== Original track listing ==
All songs written by Jerry A. (aka Jerry Lang), except for where noted.

1. "Plastic Bomb" – 3:07
2. "Deep Sleep" (Jerry A., Pig Champion, Thee Slayer Hippy, Myrtle Tickner) – 2:23
3. "The Badge" (Jerry A., Pig Champion) – 3:33
4. "Just to Get Away" – 2:31
5. "Gone for Good" (Jerry A., Aldine Strycnine) – 1:16
6. "Death of an Idiot Blues" (Jerry A., Thee Slayer Hippy) – 2:52
7. "Taken by Surprise" – 3:14
8. "Alan's on Fire" – 4:12
9. "Welcome to Krell" (Jerry A., Aldine Strycnine) – 1:58
10. "Nation of Finks" (Jerry A., Myrtle Tickner) – 1:32
11. "Back Stab Gospel" – 1:37
12. "Painkiller" (Jerry A., Myrtle Tickner) – 1:47
13. "Feel the Darkness" – 5:50
14. "Discontent" - 3:31 - CD version only

Expanded Edition

1. "Plastic Bomb"
2. "Deep Sleep" (Jerry A., Pig Champion, Thee Slayer Hippy, Myrtle Tickner)
3. "The Badge" (Jerry A., Pig Champion)
4. "Just to Get Away"
5. "Gone for Good" (Jerry A., Aldine Strycnine)
6. "Death of an Idiot Blues" (Jerry A., Thee Slayer Hippy)
7. "Taken by Surprise"
8. "Alan's on Fire"
9. "Welcome to Krell" (Jerry A., Aldine Strycnine)
10. "Nation of Finks" (Jerry A., Myrtle Tickner)
11. "Back Stab Gospel"
12. "Painkiller" (Jerry A., Myrtle Tickner)
13. "Feel the Darkness"
14. "We Got the Beat" (Charlotte Caffey)
15. "Discontent"
16. "Jail House Stomp"
17. "The Harder They Come" (Jimmy Cliff)
18. "Lawdy Miss Clawdy" (Lloyd Price)
19. "This Is It" (Jerry A., Myrtle Tickner)
20. "Plastic Bomb (Alternate Mix)"
21. "Death of an Idiot Blues (Thee Idiot Mix)"
22. "Feel the Darkness (Remix)"
23. "Crack Smoking Freak" (Charlotte Caffey, arranged by Poison Idea)

== Personnel ==
- Jerry A.: Vocals
- Aldine Strycnine: Guitar
- Pig Champion: Guitar
- Thee Slayer Hippy: Drums
- Myrtle Tickner: Bass
- Mondo: Bass on "Plastic Bomb", "Just To Get Away", "Death Of An Idiot Blues", Piano on "Plastic Bomb"
- Tony Lash - Piano on "Alan's On Fire"
- Bob Stark: Piano on "Welcome To Krell"
- Kid Cocksman: Guitar on "Plastic Bomb (Alternate Mix)"
