= Get Loaded and Fuck =

Compilation album by Poison Idea
- Released: 1988
- Genre: Hardcore punk, rock
- Label: self-released

Poison Idea chronology
War All The Time (1987)	Get Loaded and Fuck (1988)	Feel the Darkness (1990)

Ian MacKaye cover
- Censored cover of the Ian MacKaye record

Get Loaded and Fuck is a compilation by American punk rock band Poison Idea. It was originally self-released on cassette in 1988. The following year, it was reissued under the name Ian MacKaye with different cover art. The release combines three songs from the Filthkick EP ("Hangover Heart Attack", "Drug Revival", and "Ballad Of A Pre-Op") with the Getting the Fear 12" single ("Getting The Fear" and "4 A.M.") plus an additional song. The release came after guitarist Eric "Vegetable" Olsen left the band and he is listed as "Retired" on the original cassette (his nickname is also misspelled as "The Vegtable"). The record was reissued in 1995 as part of the Dysfunctional Songs for Codependent Addicts CD compilation. In 2021, it was reissued under its original name by the band's own American Leather Records.

== Ian MacKaye ==
Both Filthkick and Getting the Fear were difficult to find in the United Kingdom and only available as expensive imports. Kalvin Piper of the band Heresy had been trading records with Jerry A. and wanted to issue the records on his recently formed label, In Your Face. The band agreed, although they dropped one track from Filthkick (a cover of The Damned's "New Rose") and added a song that had not appeared on either record. The record's cover featured the spread buttocks and anus of Kevin Marshall, the roommate of Poison Idea guitarist Pig Champion. In a 2015 interview, Kalvin Piper admitted that he probably would have tried to talk any other band out of using the cover, but that Poison Idea was his favorite band. In the same interview, he claimed that when Jello Biafra saw the record he said it should have been called Ray Cappo. Ian MacKaye, who had never met the members of Poison Idea and had no issues with band prior to the record, was unhappy about the cover. For his part, Jerry A. claimed that it was only meant to be funny and was never meant to be taken seriously. The record's insert includes a picture of guitarist Kevin Sanders (a.k.a. "Kid Cocksman") who was a member of the band when the record was released, although he does not appear on the recordings. The insert was re-produced on the back cover of the 2021 CD reissue on American Leather Records.

== Legacy ==
Maximum Rocknroll, in a review of the 2021 reissue, said that "these are some of the best Poison Idea songs ever". Regarding Ian MacKaye (the person), in a 2015 interview, Jerry said:

I’m a little bit sorry that he doesn’t like that record, but I think the problem is that he always gets asked about it by people who are drunken assholes. I mean, about every six months we’ll get somebody write to us and they’ll say, Ian Mackaye was at a movie premier, answering questions from the audience, so I stood up and asked, What about that Poison Idea record? And he was like, Why can’t they just leave me alone? Please stop; it’s been 25 years! So, I think it’s those kinda people who drive him crazy. As far as I’m concerned, that whole thing was over a long time ago.

"Hangover Heart Attack" was used as the name of a 2003 Poison Idea tribute album.

== Tracklist ==
All songs written by Jerry A., Pig Champion, Mondo, Slayer Hippy, and Eric "Vegetable" Olsen

1. Hangover Heart Attack
2. Drug Revival
3. Ballad Of A Pre-Op
4. Getting The Fear
5. 4 A.M.
6. Burned For The Last Time

== Personnel ==
- Jerry A. - Voice
- Pig Champion - Guitar
- Mondo - Bass
- Thee Slayer Hippy - Drums
- Eric "Vegetable" Olsen - Lead Guitar
- Bob Stark - Engineer
