= Steve Miller (columnist) =

American politician and columnist

Steve Miller (born c. 1944) is a former Las Vegas city councilman and currently a columnist for AmericanMafia.com, an online magazine.

== Early life and career ==
Miller was born in California and raised in Las Vegas. He graduated in 1962 from Las Vegas High School.

While still a teenager, Miller and partner Keith Austin built and operated the Teenbeat Club. That led to an early career as a broadcaster from 1962 through 1966 when he and Austin hosted the Teenbeat Club television program each Saturday on KLAS. In 1998, Miller was inducted into the Nevada Broadcasters Hall of Fame. Austin eventually moved to Southern California, where he continued his career in the recording industry. On May 1, 2011, Miller and Austin were inducted into the Las Vegas Rock and Roll Hall of Fame as concert promoters and founders of the Teenbeat Club.

Miller has been credited with inventing the casino dice clock for his father's Las Vegas-based souvenir manufacturing business. The clocks were made in the USA until Miller's father, Hal, died and Miller and his mother closed the Miller Novelty Company in 1987, after 60 years in business.

From 1974 through 1982, Miller was a certified flight instructor who taught at McCarran International Airport.

Miller served as a Las Vegas City Council member for Ward 1, which included the downtown area, from 1987 to 1991. He was also a former Clark County Regional Transportation Commissioner from 1988 - 1991. Instead of running for reelection, he ran for mayor, which he lost. In 1991, Miller was voted Most Effective Public Official in the Las Vegas Review-Journal's annual reader's poll.

Steve Is the Chairman Emeritus of Goodwill Industries of Nevada, and President Emeritus of Opportunity Village for people with intellectual disabilities.

Political offices
Preceded by Al Levy	Las Vegas City Council; Ward 1; 1987 - 1991	Succeeded by Frank Hawkins
