= The Others (American band) =

American garage rock band

Background information
- Origin: South Kingstown, Rhode Island, United States
- Genres: Garage rock; folk rock
- Years active: 1964-1969
- Labels: RCA; Jubilee
- Past members: Jim DeStout; Pete Shepley; Mike Brand; Mike Patalano; John Costa; Bob Johnson; Bob Angell; Joe Parisi

The Others were an American garage rock band formed in South Kingstown, Rhode Island, in 1964. Heavily influenced by British Invasion groups, the Others enjoyed a role as one of the most popular New England musical acts, thanks in large part to their debut single "I Can’t Stand This Love, Goodbye". The record is regularly featured on 1960s garage compilation albums, most notably Pebbles, Volume 8. Three singles, including "I Can’t Stand This Love, Goodbye", were released during the group's recording career, all of which were issued nationally, and represented musical progression unheard of from the majority of garage bands.

== History ==
Co-founder Jim DeStout (lead guitar) began his rock career musically as a member of the Regions, a teen band popular on the local club circuit in Rhode Island. When the British Invasion swept across the United States, the Regions adopted their counterparts' style, a pattern which would continue when the Others formed. DeStout departed for Rhode Island University in late 1964, where he met colleagues Pete Shepley (lead vocals) and Mike Brand (rhythm guitar). DeStout, along with his friend Mike Patalano (drums) arranged a jam session with Shepley and Brand, before recruiting their fifth member, John Costa (bass guitar, vocals), and practicing their three-part vocal harmonies. DeStout reflected on the Others' first performance: "The first time we performed publicly was at ‘Rhody Night,’ a talent show at the college. We sang ‘When I Get Home’ by The Beatles", and at that point "Jim officially dropped out of the Regions and things with The Others began to snowball".

Before long, the Others were the most popular live attraction in the area, and began expanding their touring radius to other campuses and teen venues. With set lists highlighted by original material penned by Brand, Shepley and Costa, the band garnered interest from record labels just four months after forming the group. Brand's father, Irving, secured an audition in New York City with talent manager Bob Marshall, who supervised mainstream acts such as comedian Myron Cohen and vocal group the Ames Brothers. Impressed by the Others' sound, Marshall directed the group to record producer and songwriter Clyde Otis, whose experience in the music industry proved invaluable to the Others as they signed with RCA Victor Records. In June 1965, the band recorded their debut single in RCA Studio A. According to the 1960s Rhode Island Garage Bands website, four sides were completed during the session: “I Can’t Stand This Love, Goodbye", a Shepley-Brand original for the A-side, and “Until I Heard It from You”, which was composed by Otis, as its B-side. The other two songs include the unreleased "I Got a Feeling" and "The First Time I Saw You".

While the record was being prepared for national distribution, Marshall arranged for the Others to become the house band for deejay Scott Muni's new discothèque, the Rolling Stone, in mid-1965. In addition, the group was supplied with amplifiers for the duration of their residency as a part of the group's endorsement deal with Vox. In September 1965, "I Can't Stand This Love, Goodbye" was released, and was successful across the Northeast, charting on WICE radio's Top 40 survey. Music historian Rick Bellaire commented that the Others were one of the few garage bands at the time with a polished professionalism in their recording, noting: "The only other contemporary release on the same plane as the group’s first single was 'Psychotic Reaction' by The Count Five out of San Jose, California". Despite the promise of the record, "I Can't Stand This Love, Goodbye" failed to breakout nationally as a consequence of the group's decision to return to college to avoid the draft, instead of touring to publicize the single.

Nonetheless, the single's favorable results in regional markets prompted RCA to opt for a follow-up recording session. For their second single, the Others recorded "Lonely Street" in November 1965, and utilized "The First Time I Saw You" from the previous studio meeting as the flip-side to the record. With their obligations completed, the band returned to campus. In the midst of their intermission from group-related activities, Costa departed from the Others to commit full-time to his studies, and was replaced by Bob Johnson, a former member of popular campus band J. C. and the Disciples. When "Lonely Street" was distributed in March 1966, it exemplified the musical maturity the band achieved in such an abbreviated amount of time. It incorporates the poetically-inclined lyrics reminiscent of Bob Dylan, and classical arrangements which pre-dated the baroque pop explosion by nearly a year.

With a long period to focus on promoting their second release, the Others returned to their residency at the Rolling Stone, and had expanded financial backing from RCA. Although "Lonely Street" was, like its predecessor, successful in regional markets, it failed to chart nationally. The band continued to gig in various venues across New York City; however, RCA cut relations with the group in mid-1966. Despite the setback, the Others remained an in-demand live attraction, opening for major musical acts such as the Byrds, the Lovin' Spoonful, and the Animals. When Otis volunteered his services to Jubilee Records, the Others were dealt themselves into working with the label for their third and final single.

Recorded in November 1966 and rush-released in December of the same year, "Morning", backed by "My Friend the Wizard" showcases intricate vocal harmonies and primitive psychedelia. Another regional hit which did not chart nationally, the single marked the end of the Others' recording career. Regardless, the band remained on the college circuit for the next year with the same line-up. In 1968, when Brand and Patalano graduated from Rhode Island University, Brand departed for law school, while Patalano enlisted in the army and served two years in the Vietnam War. They were replaced by Bob Angell and Joe Parisi respectively, ex-members of blues rock band the Blues Outlet. In 1969, the Others disbanded, although Shepley remained in the music industry, recording the single "Bubble Gum Tree" with the Van Goghs (released under the name Penny Arcade in 1970). Shipley and Brand reunited in Peter Criss's pre-Kiss band Chelsea, releasing a self-titled album in 1970.

In 1980, "I Can't Stand This Love, Goodbye" had its first reissue, appearing on the compilation album Pebbles, Volume 8. It also is featured on Mindrocker, Volume 9 and Pebbles, Volume 10. "My Friend the Wizard" appears on New England Teen Scene, Volume 2 and Mindrocker, Volume 12. Surviving members of the Others organized a reunion in 2015 in coordination with their induction into the Rhode Island Music Hall of Fame.

== Discography ==
- "I Can’t Stand This Love, Goodbye" b/w "Until I Heard It from You" - RCA Records (47-8669), 1965
- "Lonely Street" b/w "(I Remember) The First Time I Saw You" - RCA Records (47-8776), 1966
- "Morning" b/w "My Friend the Wizard" - Jubilee Records (45-0550), 1966
