= Confuse & Conquer =

Studio album by Poison Idea
- Released: April 7, 2015
- Genre: Hardcore punk
- Length: 34:39
- Label: Southern Lord

Poison Idea chronology
| Latest Will and Testament (2006) | Confuse & Conquer (2015) |

Confuse & Conquer is the seventh studio album by the American hardcore punk band Poison Idea. It was released on CD and LP by Southern Lord on April 7, 2015. It was the band's first full-length release since 2006's Latest Will and Testament and, as of 2022, their last studio album. A recording of the band's late guitarist, Tom "Pig Champion" Roberts, was included in the song "Hypnotic".

== Reception ==
Professional ratings
Review scores
| Source | Rating |
|---|---|
| AllMusic | 4/5 stars |
| Louder Sound | 4/5 stars |
| Louder Than War | 7/10 stars |
| Punknews.org | 4/5 stars |

Reviews for Confuse & Conquer were largely positive. Verbicide said "Confuse & Conquer easily stands right next to some of their classic albums", and Invisible Oranges stated that the LP "maintains their signature sound without getting bogged down by stale tropes". Fred Thomas of AllMusic claimed that the album offered "a set of tunes that feel freshly anguished and uproarious rather than aiming to re-create the energy of the band in their earlier incarnations". Joshua Hart at Louder Than War, in what was otherwise a mostly positive review, criticized "Hypnotic" as "a boring rerecording of an older song" and labeled "Me + JD" as "slapdash Ramones-light with too-loud drums".

== Track listing ==
1. "Bog" (Jerry Lang, Brandon Bentley)
2. "Me + JD" (Lang)
3. "Psychic Wedlock" (Lang, Chris Carey)
4. "Hypnotic" (Lang)
5. "Trip Wire" (Lang, Eric Olsen)
6. "I Don't Know You" (Lang)
7. "Cold Black Afternoon" (Lang, Bentley, Olsen)
8. "The Rhythms of Insanity" (Lang, Nathan Richardson)
9. "Dead Cowboy" (Lang)
10. "Beautiful Disaster" (Lang, Carey)
11. Reprise

== Personnel ==
- Gordon Scholl - Drums on "Hypnotic"
- Natalie Lucio & May May Del Castro - Back Up Vocals
- Joel Grind & Brad Boatright - Recording, Mixing, and Mastering
