= Record Collectors Are Pretentious Assholes =

EP by Poison Idea
- Released: 1985
- Recorded: August 14–18, 1984
- Genre: Hardcore punk
- Length: 13:18 (original); 22:56 (reissue)
- Label: Fatal Erection

Poison Idea chronology
Pick Your King (1983)	Record Collectors Are Pretentious Assholes (1985)	Kings of Punk (1986)

Professional ratings
Review scores
Source	Rating
Metal Hammer	5/5 stars
New Musical Express	0/10

Record Collectors Are Pretentious Assholes is hardcore punk band Poison Idea's second EP. It was released in 1985 through Fatal Erection Records.

The artwork, coupled with the title, is a joke at the expense of guitarist Pig Champion, as it is a picture of his extensive record collection.

== Critical reception ==
Trouser Press wrote that "the blind rage of songs like 'Die on Your Knees' and 'Don’t Like It Here' ... is as formidable as pre-domestication Iggy." AllMusic wrote that the EP "fine-tune[ed] the band's blistering sound and fatalistic worldview."

== Track listing ==
=== Original EP ===
1. "A.A." - 1:32
2. "Legalize Freedom" - 1:44
3. "Cold Comfort" - 1:14
4. "Thorn in My Side" - 2:00
5. "Rubber Husband" - 1:30
6. "Rich Get Richer" - 1:25
7. "Don't Like It Here" - 1:50
8. "Time to Go" - 2:03

=== Reissue track list ===
1. "A.A." - 1:32
2. "Legalize Freedom" - 1:44
3. "Cold Comfort" - 1:14
4. "Typical" - 1:54
5. "Thorn in My Side" - 2:00
6. "Laughing Boy" - 1:41
7. "Rubber Husband" - 1:30
8. "I Gotta Right" (Iggy and the Stooges Cover) - 3:18
9. "Rich Get Richer" - 1:25
10. "Don't Like It Here" - 1:50
11. "Die on Your Knees" - 2:45
12. "Time to Go" - 2:03

== Poison Idea's Record Collectors are Still Pretentious Assholes Challenge ==
The expanded reissue of the album released in 2022 was packaged with a poster listing 81 of the records pictured on the cover, with a challenge to the listener to collect all of the records themselves:

- The Adverts - One Chord Wonders
- Agent Orange (Note: Dutch band, not to be confused with Agent Orange.) - Your Mother Sucks Cocks in Hell...
- Angelic Upstarts - The Murder of Liddle Towers
- Anti Cimex - Raped Ass
- Antidote (Note: American band, not to be confused with Antidote.) - Thou Shalt Not Kill
- Anti-Nowhere League - Streets of London
- Anti-Nowhere League - We Are...The League
- Avengers - We Are the One
- B.G.K. - White Male Dumbinance
- Bad Religion - Bad Religion
- Bags - Survive
- Battalion of Saints - Fighting Boys
- Battalion of Saints - Second Coming
- Black Flag - Nervous Breakdown
- The Blood - Stark Raving Normal
- The Blood - Megalomania
- The Boys - First Time
- Cani- Guai a voi!
- Charles Manson - Lie: The Love and Terror Cult
- The Child Molesters - Wir lieben die jugendlich Mädchen
- Cockney Rejects - Greatest Hits Volume 1
- Crime - Hot Wire My Heart
- The Damned - The Black Album
- The Damned - New Rose
- Dead Boys - Sonic Reducer
- The Dickies - Banana Splits
- The Dickies - Dawn of the Dickies
- Elvis Presley - Elvis Presley (Note: 1956 EP with the same cover and containing 4 songs from his debut album, also called Elvis Presley.)
- Elvis Presley - It's Midnight
- E.A.T.E.R. (Note: Swedish band, not to be confused with Eater.) - Doomsday Troops
- The Fartz - Because This Fuckin' World Stinks...
- The Fix - Vengeance
- Frites Modern - Veel, Vet, Goor en Duur
- Germs - Forming
- Germs - Lexicon Devil (Note: Appears on the list twice.)
- Germs - (GI)
- Johnny Moped - Cycledelic
- Kangrena - Terrorismo sonoro
- Kohu-63 - Valtaa ei loistoa
- Legionaire’s Disease Band - Downtown
- The Meatmen - Blüd Sausage
- The Meatmen - We're The Meatmen...and You Suck!!
- Menace - Screwed Up
- Mentors - Live at the Whisky / Cathay De Grande
- The Misfits - Cough/Cool
- The Misfits - Bullet
- The Misfits - Horror Business
- The Misfits - Beware
- Motörhead - Motörhead
- Necros - Necros
- New York Dolls - New York Dolls
- The Nikoteens - Aloah-Oehh
- Noncens - 6 låtars
- Out of Our Heads - Riot
- Quick and the Dead - Another Violent Night
- Rough- Torino è la mia città
- S.O.A. - No Policy
- The Saints - This Perfect Day
- Sex Pistols - Indecent Exposure
- Skitslickers - GBG 1982
- Skrewdriver - All Skrewed Up
- Skrewdriver - Voice of Britain
- The Subhumans - The Subhumans
- J. D. Sumner - Elvis Has Left the Building
- Syd Barrett - The Madcap Laughs
- The Teen Idles - Minor Disturbance
- Tesco Vee and The Meatkrew - Dutch Hercules
- Toy Dolls - Dig That Groove Baby
- Último Resorte - Cementerio caliente
- United Mutation - Fugitive Family
- Upright Citizens - Make the Future Mine & Yours
- Various artists - Flex Your Head
- Various artists - Tooth and Nail
- Various artists - Yes L.A.
- Various artists - Oi! The Album
- Various artists - What? Records
- Big Boys / The Dicks - Live at Raul's Club
- The Faith / Void - Faith / Void Split
- Wretched / Indigesti - Wretched/Indigesti
- Youth Brigade - Sound & Fury

== Personnel ==
- Jerry A. - Vocals
- Tom "Pig Champion" Roberts - Guitar
- Chris Tense - Bass
- Dean Johnson - Drums
