= Napalm Beach =

American rock band

- Origin: Portland, Oregon, U.S.
- Genres: Punk rock, hard rock, grunge, punk blues
- Years active: 1981–present
- Labels: Flying Heart, Tim/Kerr, Zeno, Skullman, CM/Shinola, Here After/Imperial, Loves Simple Dreams, Satyricon, Dream Hunter
- Members: Chris Newman; Sam Henry; Dave Dillinger

Napalm Beach is an American rock band formed in Portland, Oregon. They are considered early innovators of the grunge sound. Nicholas Pell, writing for the Portland Mercury said "a huge influence on the grunge and alternative rock of the 1990s, Napalm Beach never had the name recognition of other Portland bands like Poison Idea or the Wipers." Napalm Beach shared the stage with bands such as X, Public Image Ltd., Joan Jett, Johnny Thunders, Gun Club, Bad Brains, Soundgarden, Screaming Trees, Mudhoney, Dead Moon, and Poison Idea. They also toured Germany five times between 1989 and 1992. During their long musical career they have released more than 30 studio and live recordings in various formats on a number of small independent labels in the U.S. and Germany.

At the core of the group was Chris Newman on guitar, and Sam Henry on drums. Sam Henry was the original drummer for the Wipers and Portland band The Rats (with Fred and Toody Cole) before joining Napalm Beach in 1981. The group went through thirteen bass players before Dave Dillinger came on board in 1989. The group's earliest recordings were done on the Trap label, owned by Greg Sage of the Wipers.

Courtney Love lived in the Napalm Beach band house in 1981.

== Discography ==
Year	Title	Record label
1981	Trap Sampler LP with other artists (produced by Greg Sage).	Trap (U.S.)
1983	Live at the Met Cassette (produced by Greg Sage)	Trap (U.S.)
1983	Rock & Roll Hell Cassette (produced by Greg Sage)	Trap (U.S.)
1984	Pugsley Cassette	Skullman (U.S.)
1985	"Why Do Parties Have to End?" on Doomtown PDX: Portland Punk '78-'85 Cassette	Mississippi Records (U.S.)
1985	Teen Dream Cassette	Here After/Imperial (U.S.)
1986	Napalm Beach (Teen Dream) LP	Here After/Imperial (U.S.)
1986	Moving to and Fro Cassette	Skullman (U.S.)
1988	Moving to and Fro LP	Loves Simple Dreams (Germany)
1988	Liquid Love Cassette, LP, CD	Flying Heart (U.S.)
1990	Fire Air and Water Cassette, LP, CD	Satyricon (Germany)/Flying Heart (U.S.)
1990	Satyricon...the Album LP (Compilation by a Portland nightclub called Satyricon, not the German label.)	Satyricon (U.S.)
1990	"Pugsley" 45 rpm flexi-disc in Ptolemaic Terrascope magazine Vol.2, No.1, Sept. 1990.	(U.K.)
1991	Thunder Lizard LP, CD	Satyricon (Germany)
1991	Rumblin' Thunder: Raw and Alive Over Germany LP (Live box set with Dead Moon)	Heart is a Lonely Hunter aka Dream Hunter (Germany)
1991	"Chatterbox" on A Tribute to Johnny Thunders 45 rpm box set with other artists.	Tim Kerr (U.S.)
1991	"Just One Day" 45 rpm flexi-disc in Howl magazine No.11	(Germany)
1992	Xmas With Satyricon CD (Live recording of five Napalm Beach songs plus two other artists).	Satyricon (Germany)
1992	"Potential Suicide" on Eight Songs for Greg Sage and the Wipers 45 rpm vinyl box set with other artists including Nirvana.	Tim Kerr (U.S.)
1992	Summertime Again/Last Big Heartache 45 rpm single.	Tim Kerr (U.S.)
1992	Curiosities CD	Satyricon (Germany)
1993	Curiosities CD	Tim Kerr (U.S.)
1993	"Potential Suicide" on Fourteen Songs for Greg Sage CD with other artists including Nirvana.	Tim Kerr (U.S.)
1993	"My Master Calls" 45 rpm flexi-disc with Poison Idea in Flipside Magazine.	Tim Kerr (U.S.)
1994	Volunteer CD (Although credited as a Chris Newman solo CD, all 12 songs are studio re-recordings of earlier Napalm Beach songs from the 1981 Trap Sampler LP, as well as the 1983 Rock and Roll Hell, and 1984 Pugsley cassettes.)	Flying Heart (U.S.)
1994	In My Tree CD	CM/Shinola (U.S.)
1995	In My Tree CD	Dream Hunter (Germany)
2000	History of Portland Punk, Vol. I CD	Zeno (U.S.)
2004	Rock And Roll Hell CD (Combined digital re-release of the Live at the Met and Rock & Roll Hell cassettes)	Zeno (U.S.)
2008	Kill for My Bitch CD (Live recording of a reunion show)	(U.S.)
2009	Moving To And Fro CD (Vinyl transfer digital re-release of the original LP).	Skullman (U.S.)
2011	Teen Dream CD (Vinyl transfer digital re-release of the original LP).	Skullman (U.S.)
