= Pick Your King =

EP by Poison Idea
- Released: 1983
- Recorded: January 20, 1983
- Genre: Hardcore punk
- Length: 12:40
- Label: Fatal Erection Records, Reflex/Wolfpack Records

Poison Idea chronology
Darby Crash Rides Again (1982)	Pick Your King (1983)	Record Collectors Are Pretentious Assholes (1984)

Professional ratings
Review scores
Source	Rating
Allmusic	2.5/5 stars

Pick Your King is the title of American hardcore punk band Poison Idea's debut EP, released in 1983 via Fatal Erection Records. The album jacket featured a "choice" of kings (hence the title), one side had an image of Jesus Christ, the other side an image of Elvis Presley, a.k.a. "The King". The EP was reissued in 2005 by Reflex/Wolfpack Records on a compilation 12" also containing the 'Learning To Scream' EP.

== Track listing ==
1. "Think Twice" - 0:41
2. "It's An Action" - 1:26
3. "This Thing Called Progress" - 1:01
4. "In My Head Ache" - 1:07
5. "Underage" - 0:58
6. "Self Abuse" - 0:54
7. "Cult Band" - 0:42
8. "Last One" - 0:51
9. "Pure Hate" - 1:41
10. "Castration" - 0:28
11. "(I Hate) Reggae" - 1:18
12. "Give It Up" - 0:27
13. "Think Fast" - 1:06

== Personnel ==
- Jerry A. - Vocals
- Tom "Pig Champion" Roberts - Guitar
- Chris Tense - Bass
- Dean Johnson - Drums
