= Pebbles, Volume 7 (1980 album) =

Compilation album
- Released: 1980
- Recorded: Mid-1960s
- Genre: Garage rock, psychedelic rock
- Length: 43:26
- Label: BFD; AIP

chronology
Pebbles, Volume 6 (1980)	Pebbles, Volume 7 (1980)	Pebbles, Volume 8 (1980)

Pebbles, Volume 7 is a compilation album in the Pebbles series. The music on this album has no relation to Pebbles, Volume 7 which was released on CD many years later.

== Release data ==
This album was released as an LP by BFD Records in 1980 (as #BFD-5024) and was kept in print for many years by AIP Records.

== Notes on the tracks ==
The Human Beings are not to be confused with the Human Beinz, which make an appearance on Pebbles, Volume 8. A song by The Chocolate Watchband was included on the original Nuggets compilation, and the Dovers are also represented on Pebbles, Volume 2. Craig are an English group.

== Track listing ==
Side 1:

1. Something Wild: "Trippin' Out", 2:05
2. The Descendants: "Lela", 2:30
3. The Denims: "White Ship", 2:42
4. The Heard: "Stop It Baby", 2:23
5. Hysterics: "Everything's There", 2:15
6. Silver Fleet: "Look out World", 2:41
7. The Human Beings: "You're Bad News", 2:11
8. The Chocolate Watchband: "Sweet Young Thing", 2:41
9. The Craig: "I Must Be Mad", 2:52

Side 2:

1. The Edge: "Seen through the Eyes", 2:58
2. We the People: "When I Arrive", 3:01
3. The Survivors: "Shakin' with Linda", 2:48
4. Four Fifths: "If You Still Want Me", 2:00
5. The Dovers: "She's Not Just Anybody", 1:54
6. Sunday Funnies: "A Pindaric Ode", 2:12
7. The Painted Ship: "Frustration", 2:53
8. The Live Wires: "Love", 3:20
