= War All the Time (Poison Idea album) =

Studio album by Poison Idea
- Released: 1987
- Genre: Hardcore punk
- Length: 29:45
- Label: Alchemy

Poison Idea chronology
Kings of Punk (1986)	War All the Time (1987)	Get Loaded and Fuck (1988)

War All the Time is the fourth release and second full-length by hardcore punk band Poison Idea, released in 1987 by Alchemy Records. It is named after a book by Charles Bukowski.

It was re-released by Tim/Kerr in 1994.

== Track listing ==
1. "The Temple" (Jerry A.) - 2:42
2. "Romantic Self Destruction" (Jerry A., Pig Champion) - 2:37
3. "Push the Button" (Jerry A., Eric Olson, Steve Hanford) - 2:03
4. "Ritual Chicken" (Eric Olson) - 0:58
5. "Nothing Is Final" (Jerry A.) - 2:40
6. "Motorhead" (Lemmy Kilmister) - 2:44
7. "Hot Time" (Jerry A., Chris Tense) - 3:12
8. "Steel Rule" (Jerry A., Eric Olson) - 3:23
9. "Typical" (Jerry A.) - 1:42
10. "Murder" (Jerry A., Chris Tense) - 2:23
11. "Marked for Life" (Jerry A.) - 2:58

== Personnel ==
- Jerry A. – Vocals
- Tom "Pig Champion" Roberts – Guitar
- Eric "Vegetable" Olson – Guitar
- Chris Tense – Bass
- Steve "Thee Slayer Hippy" Hanford – Drums
