= Kings of Punk =

Studio album by Poison Idea
- Released: 1986
- Genre: Hardcore punk
- Length: 26:00
- Labels: Pusmort, Reflex/Wolfpack

Poison Idea chronology
| Record Collectors Are Pretentious Assholes (1984) | Kings of Punk (1986) | War All the Time (1987) |

Professional ratings
Review scores
| Source | Rating |
|---|---|
| Metal Hammer | 5/5 stars |
| New Musical Express | 0/10 |

Kings of Punk is the third release and first LP by hardcore punk band Poison Idea, released in 1986 through Pushead's Pusmort Records label. It was re-released by Reflex/Wolfpack Records in 2003 on a limited vinyl pressing.

== Track listing ==
All songs written by Jerry A, except where noted.

1. "Lifestyles" (Jerry A, Pig Champion) – 3:14
2. "Short Fuse" – 1:59
3. "God Not God" (Jerry A, Chris Tense) – 0:51
4. "Ugly American" – 2:58
5. "Subtract" (Chris Tense) – 1:40
6. "Cop an Attitude" (Jerry A, Pig Champion) – 2:25
7. "Death Wish Kids" – 2:15
8. "Made to Be Broken" – 2:53
9. "Tormented Imp" (Jerry A, Chris Tense) – 2:13
10. "One by One" (Jerry A, Chris Tense) – 2:17
11. "Out of the Picture" (Jerry A, Chris Tense) – 3:15

== Personnel ==
- Jerry A. – Vocals
- Tom "Pig Champion" Roberts – Guitar
- Chris Tense – Bass
- Dean Johnson – Drums
