= Pebbles, Volume 8 (1980 album) =

Compilation album
- Released: 1980
- Recorded: Mid-1960s
- Genre: Garage rock, psychedelic rock
- Length: 44:28
- Label: BFD; AIP

chronology
Pebbles, Volume 7 (1980)	Pebbles, Volume 8 (1980)	Pebbles, Volume 9 (1980)

Pebbles, Volume 8 is a compilation album among the LPs in the Pebbles series. The music on this album has no relation to Pebbles, Volume 8 that was released on CD many years later.

== Release data ==
This album was released as an LP by BFD Records in 1980 (as #BFD-5025) and was kept in print for many years by AIP Records.

== Notes on the tracks ==
"I Never Loved Her" by the Starfires is one of the most sought after garage rock singles and has brought $1,000 or more. This band has no relation to the band of the same name that later evolved into the Outsiders (see Pebbles, Volume 9). Question Mark & the Mysterians is one of the many Latino garage rock bands and is well known for their major hit with "96 Tears". The Human Beinz also had a Top 40 hit with "Nobody but Me". The Lollipop Shoppe was originally known as the Weeds, which is represented among the bonus tracks on the Pebbles, Volume 1 CD.

== Track listing ==
Side 1:

1. The Lollipop Shoppe: "You Must Be a Witch", 2:40
2. The Starfires: "I Never Loved Her", 2:43
3. The Gants: "I Wonder", 2:14
4. The Sound Barrier: "(My) Baby's Gone", 2:49
5. The JuJus: "Hey Little Girl", 2:06
6. The Uncalled For: "Do Like Me", 2:44
7. The Bruthers: "Bad Way to Go", 2:50
8. The Clue: "Bad Times", 2:00
9. Faine Jade: "It Ain't True", 3:09

Side 2:

1. The Caravelles: "Lovin' Just My Style", 3:03
2. The Human Beinz: "My Generation", 2:41
3. Question Mark & the Mysterians: "Make You Mine", 2:46
4. The Others: "I Can't Stand This Love, Goodbye", 2:07
5. The Cindermen: "Don't Do it Some More", 1:50
6. The Rovin' Flames: "How Many Times", 1:57
7. The Rockin' Ramrods: "She Lied", 2:05
8. Movin' Morfomen: "Run Girl Run", 1:52
9. The Lemon Drops: "I Live in the Springtime", 2:52
