= The Starfires =

American garage rock band

- Origin: Los Angeles, California, U.S.
- Genres: Garage rock
- Years active: 1965–1967
- Labels: G.I. Records, Yardbird Records
- Past members: Chuck Butler; Dave Anderson; Freddie Fields; Jack Emerick; Sonny Lathrop

The Starfires was an American garage rock band from Los Angeles that is best known for one of the most sought-after singles of the mid-1960s, "I Never Loved Her", which can command prices of $1000 or more (although reproductions of the single are also available).

== Discography ==
=== Singles ===
- "Linda" b/w "I Never Loved Her"; G.I. Records (#4001); released May 1965
- "There's Still Time"; Yardbird Records (#4005); 1965
- "The Hardest Way:' Yardbird Records (#4006); July 1966

=== Compilation albums ===
- "I Never Loved Her"
1. Pebbles, Volume 8 (LP)
2. Pebbles, Volume 8 (CD)
3. Essential Pebbles, Volume 1 (CD)
4. Best of Pebbles, Volume 3 (LP and CD)
5. Psychedelic Unknowns, Volume 1 (LP)
6. Psychedelic Unknowns, Volume 2 (LP)
- "Linda"
1. Highs in the Mid-Sixties, Volume 1 (LP)
2. Mondo Frat Dance Bash A Go Go (CD)
- "Cry for Freedom"
1. Pebbles, Volume 9 (CD)
- "There's Still Time"
1. Basementville USA! (LP)
2. Acid and Flowers (CD)
- "You Done Me Wrong"
1. Psychedelic Unknowns, Volume 3 (LP) – second edition
2. Psychedelic Unknowns, Volume 3 (CD)
- "The Hardest Way"
1. You're Playing with Fire (LP)
2. Trip in Tyme, Volume 1 (CD)
