= Chris Newman (American musician) =

American musician (1953–2021)

- Born: 11 July 1953; Longview, Washington, US
- Died: May 9, 2021 (aged 67)
- Genres: Rock
- Instrument: Guitar

Christopher Lynn Newman (July 11, 1953 – May 9, 2021) was an American musician from Oregon. In 2007, he was inducted to the Oregon Music Hall of Fame.

== Early life ==
Christopher Newman was born on July 11, 1953 in Longview, Washington.

== Career ==
Newman spent most of his musical career in Portland, Oregon, leading bands such as Napalm Beach, Snow Bud and the Flower People (formed 1986), Boo Frog, and the Chris Newman Deluxe Combo. Newman played frequently in and around Portland and Seattle beginning in the 1970s, and was known for his intense blues- and psychedelic-influenced guitar leads and vocal stylings ranging from operatic to powerhouse bellows. Newman was revered for his prolific songwriting talent and live performances Much of his early music was distributed on homemade cassettes throughout the Pacific Northwest during the 1980s, and his 1960s garage-influenced riff-heavy rock has been cited as an influence by many of the Pacific Northwest "grunge" bands that became popular in the 1990s.

In 2007, Newman was among the first group of honorees inducted into the Oregon Music Hall of Fame. He recorded around thirty studio albums. Napalm Beach, featuring drummer Sam Henry (Wipers), toured Europe in 1989 and played Berlin the day the wall first came down. Newman continued to write music and record in his 8-track studio up to 2021.

== Death ==
After being diagnosed with terminal cancer in January 2021, Newman died on 9 May 2021.
