= Toody Cole =

American musical artist

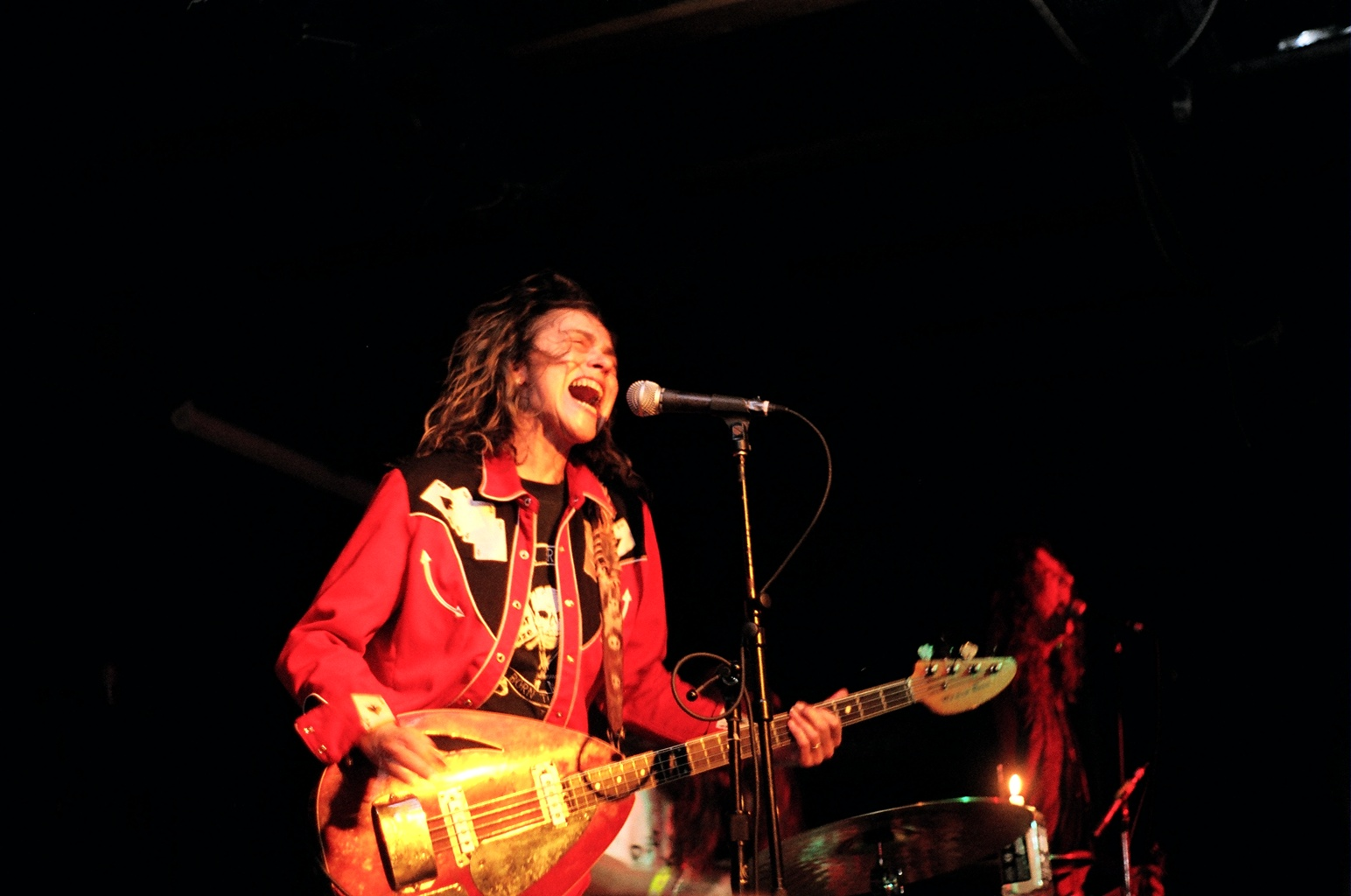
- Cole in Austin, Texas, 2006

Background information
- Also known as: Toody Cole
- Born: Kathleen Alice Conner; December 30, 1948 (age 77); Portland, Oregon, U.S.
- Genres: Punk rock; garage rock; rock and roll
- Occupation: Musician
- Instruments: Vocals; bass
- Years active: 1978–present
- Labels: Tombstone; Music Maniac; Vice; Sub Pop; Mississippi
- Spouse: Fred Cole (m. 1967; died 2017)
- Website: www.deadmoonusa.com

Toody Cole (born Kathleen Conner; December 30, 1948) is an American musician known primarily for her contributions as a bassist, vocalist, and co-founder of the Portland garage rock band Dead Moon, alongside husband Fred Cole. Beyond their musical endeavors, she also co-owned their record label, Tombstone Records.

== Early life ==
Kathleen Conner was born in Portland, Oregon, in 1948, being the third child among her parents' eventual seven children. During her high school years, she acquired the nickname "Toody" from her peers, which was inspired by a character from the 1960s cop sitcom Car 54, Where Are You?

In 1966, while volunteering at Portland club, the Folk Singer, Toody crossed paths with Fred Cole, who was touring with his band the Weeds at the time. In June 1967, at the age of 18, they exchanged vows in a modest family ceremony officiated by a justice of the peace, their union marked by a six-dollar gold ring.

== Career ==
In the early 1970s, after having three children, the family headed for Alaska with the intention of homesteading, before settling near Whitehorse in the Canadian Yukon. Complications reentering Canada after a visit home from Christmas led them to settle permanently in Portland. During this time Mr. Cole continued his music career while he and Toody ventured into retail entrepreneurship.

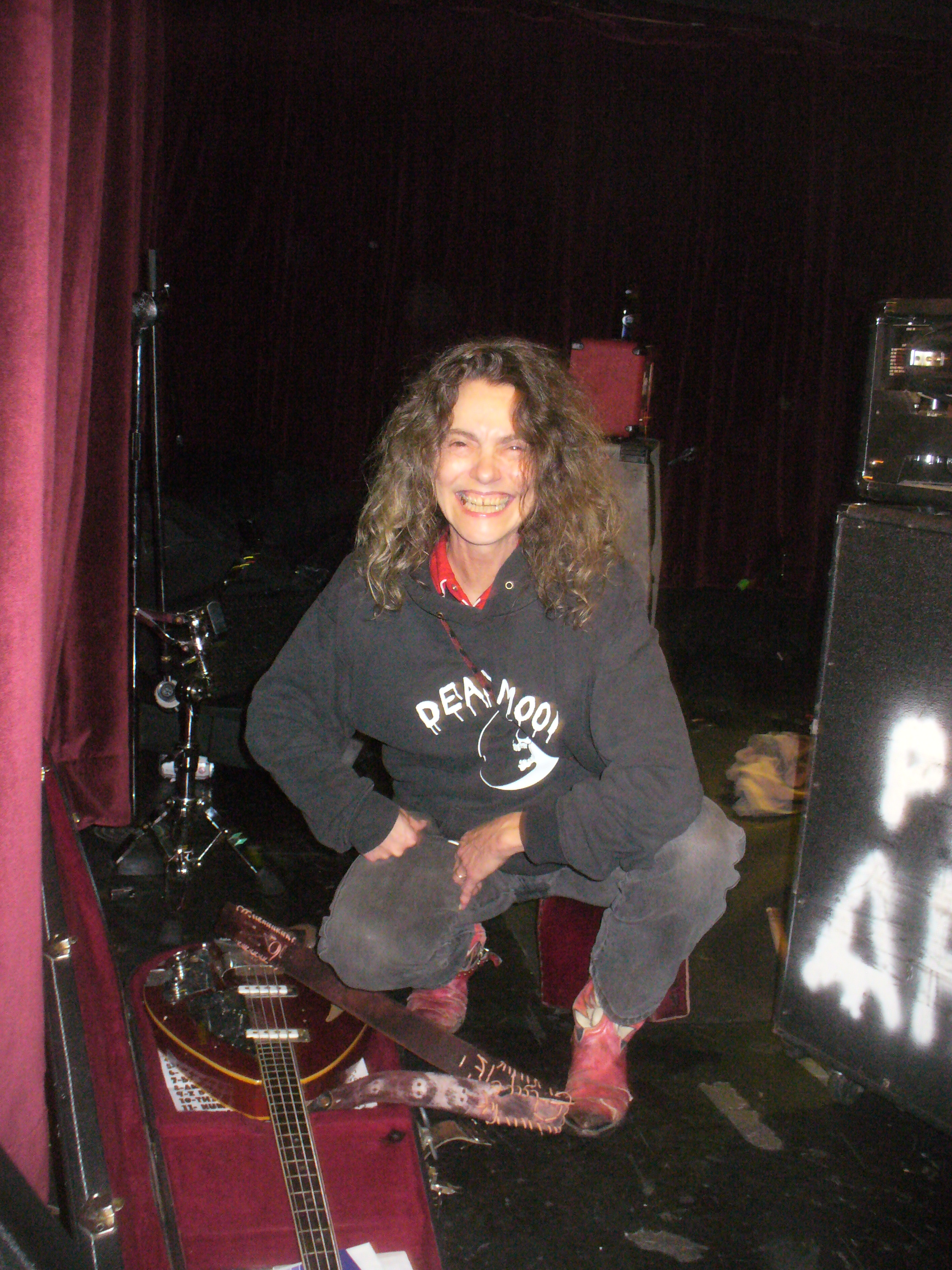
Toody Cole in 2012

In 1978, Toody embarked on her bass-playing journey, co-founding the Rats alongside her husband.

"Fred talked me into it, He was so sick of male bass players who were flaky as hell."

Following intermittent performances with the band Western Front, they established the western-themed band, The Range Rats, in 1986, before ultimately forming Dead Moon in 1987. Dead Moon remained active until 2006 before disbanding, prompting Toody and her husband to form Pierced Arrows. Pierced Arrows was active until 2015, after which Fred and Toody Cole continued to perform as a duo until Fred's passing in 2017.

In 2023 Toody started "Toody Cole and her Band" where she performs songs from her past bands. She performs with Christopher March (of Jenny Don't and the Spurs) and former Pierced Arrows bandmate, Kelly Halliburton, as backing musicians. In December 2024, Toody Cole and her Band performed in Seattle, Washington at the Tractor Tavern, with Is This Real? (featuring Matt Cameron of Pearl Jam) as the supporting act.

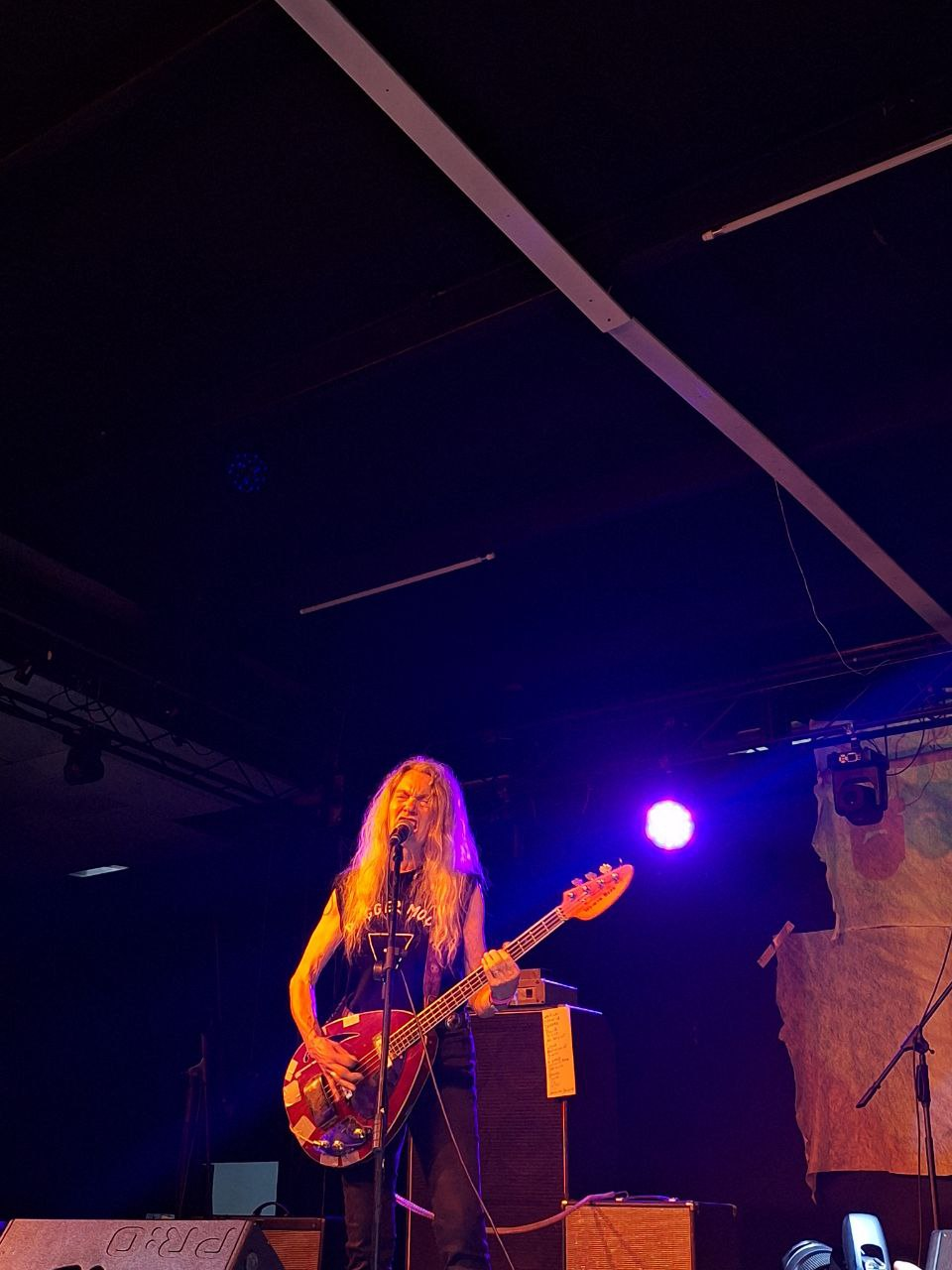
Cole performing in Mexico City, 2024.

In 2025, Toody Cole and her band performed in Mexico City, headlined the Funtastic Dracula festival in Spain, and toured Australia and New Zealand.

== Personal life ==
Toody and Fred Cole were married for 50 years, until his death on November 9, 2017.

In 2019, she briefly opened an antique store called Junkstore Cowboy that was located in the basement of Portland's Mississippi Records.
