= The Lollipop Shoppe =

American garage rock band

- Also known as: The Weeds
- Origin: Las Vegas, Nevada, United States
- Genre: Garage rock
- Years active: 1966–1971
- Labels: Teenbeat Club; Uni; Shamley; NWI
- Past members: Fred Cole; Eddie Bowen; Ron Buzzell; Bob Atkins; Tim Rockson

The Lollipop Shoppe was an American garage rock band formed in Las Vegas, Nevada, in 1966.

== Biography ==
In 1964, Fred Cole (lead vocals) recorded his first single, an R&B original with a group known as the Lords, but the band proved to be short-lived, and in 1966, Cole formed the Weeds. The Weeds consisted of Cole, Eddie Bowen (guitar), Ron Buzzell (rhythm guitar), Bob Atkins (bass guitar), and Tim Rockson (drums). After releasing a single, "It's Your Time", on the local Teenbeat Club label, the group headed to San Francisco, where they had been promised a gig at the Fillmore Auditorium. Upon arrival, however, they learned that nobody associated with the Fillmore knew anything about the gig. It was around this time that the band members, who were all of draftable age, decided to relocate to Canada. As it turned out, however, they only had enough gas money to make it to Portland, Oregon, where they began to perform on the local club circuit, gaining a cult following. The Weeds eventually attracted the attention of Uni Records (a subsidiary of MCA), who signed the group to a recording contract. Without the knowledge or consent of the band their new manager, 'Lord' Tim Hudson, changed the band's name to the Lollipop Shoppe to assimilate into the trend of bubblegum pop music.

The band's actual recordings, including the 1968 album Just Colour, are in actuality a mix of garage rock and psychedelia. The album and its single, "You Must Be a Witch" – later included on the compilation album Pebbles, Volume 8 – are regarded as garage rock classics for its hard-edge musical stance, and is still prized by record collectors, though neither made the charts. Two of the Lollipop Shoppe's songs appeared in the 1968 film Angels from Hell. The group toured and released one more single, "Someone I Knew" b/w "Through My Window", before breaking up in 1969. They reunited as the Weeds for a 1971 single on the Portland, Oregon, NWI label, "Stop" b/w "No Good News", but soon disbanded for the final time. All of the band's recordings have been reissued on the compilation, The Weeds – AKA The Lollipop Shoppe, in 2007 on Way Back Records.

Australian garage band the Philisteins covered "You Must Be a Witch" on their 1988 EP Bloody Convicts.

American punk rocker Stiv Bators covered "You Must Be a Witch" on his The Last Race album, released in 1996.

Pittsburgh garage band the Cynics covered "You Must Be a Witch" on their 1993 LP Learn to lose.

Memphis synth punk band Lost Sounds covered "You Must Be a Witch" on their 2000 LP Memphis Is Dead.

The Black Lips covered "You Must Be a Witch" during their Rhapsody Originals set.

UK punk band The Damned covered "You Must Be a Witch" on their 2026 LP Not Like Everybody Else.

== Discography ==
=== Singles ===
As the Weeds

- "It's Your Time" b/w "Little Girl" – Teenbeat Club TB-1006, 1966
- "Stop" b/w "No Good News" – NWI Records NWI-2784, 1971

As The Lollipop Shoppe

- "You Must Be a Witch" b/w "Don't Close the Door" – Uni Records UNI-55050, 1968
- "Someone I Knew" b/w "Through My Window" – Shamley Records S-44005, 1969

=== Albums ===
- Just Colour – Uni Records UNI-73019, 1968
- The Weeds – AKA The Lollipop Shoppe – Way Back Records MMCD-66026, 2007
