= Dead Moon =

American rock and roll band

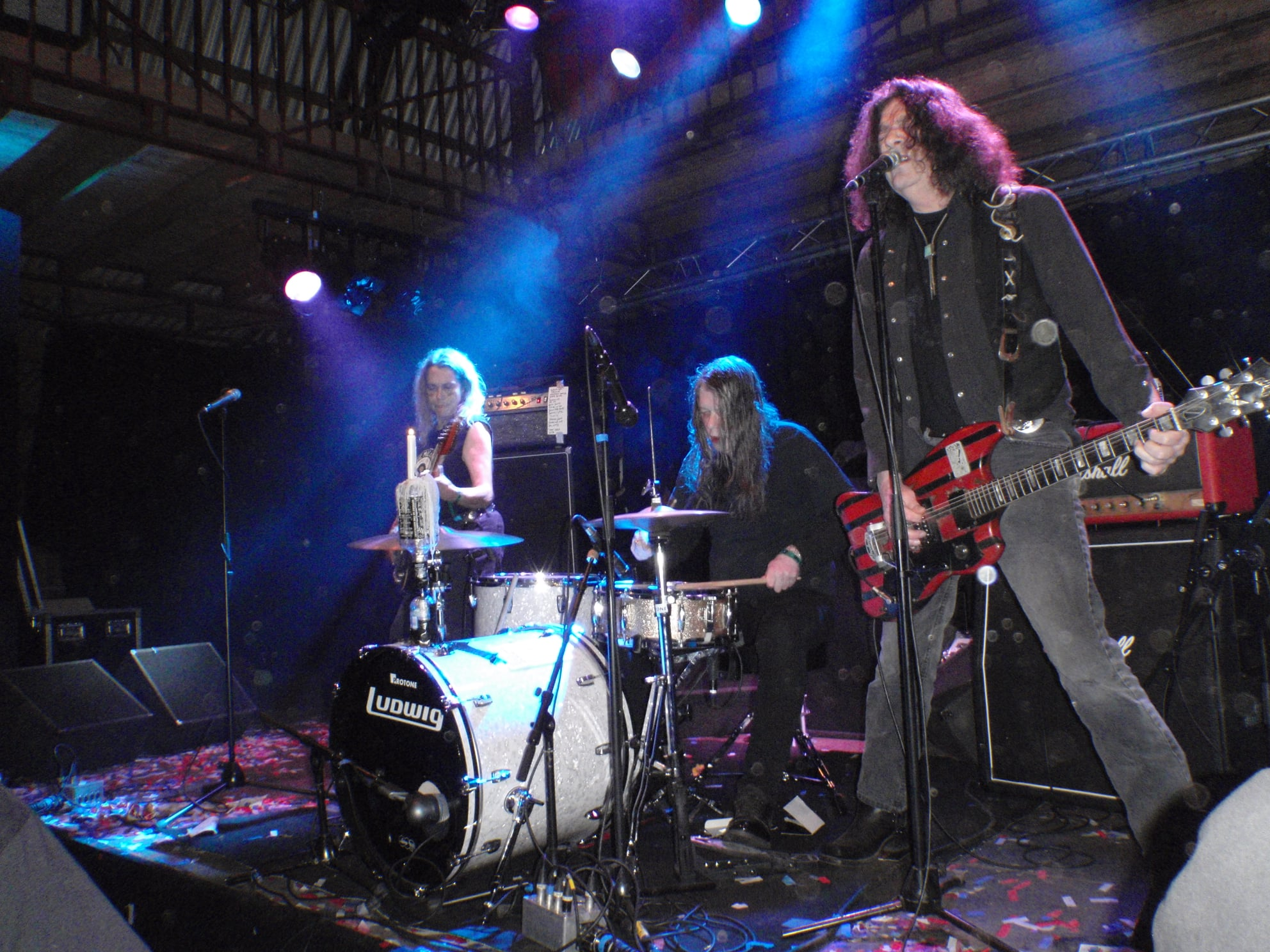
- Dead Moon performing live in 2015; from left to right: Toody Cole, Andrew Loomis, and Fred Cole.

Background information
- Origin: Portland, Oregon, U.S.
- Genres: Punk rock, garage punk, garage rock
- Years active: 1987–2006, 2014–2017
- Past members: Fred Cole; Toody Cole; Andrew Loomis
- Website: deadmoonusa.com

Dead Moon was an American rock band formed in 1987 in Portland, Oregon. The band consisted of singer/guitarist Fred Cole, singer/bassist Toody Cole and drummer Andrew Loomis. Dead Moon initially disbanded in 2006, before reuniting in 2014 and disbanding again in 2017 following the deaths of Loomis and Fred Cole. The band released ten studio albums, six live albums and three compilation albums.

== History ==
Dead Moon was formed by singer/guitarist Fred Cole, singer/bassist Toody Cole and drummer Andrew Loomis. Veterans of Portland's independent rock scene, the band combined dark and lovelorn themes with punk and country music influences into a stripped-down sound. Frontman Cole engineered most of the band's recordings and mastered them on a mono recording lathe that was used for The Kingsmen's version of "Louie Louie". Their early records, such as In the Graveyard, were released on the Tombstone Records label, named for the musical equipment store the Coles operated at the time. Soon they caught the attention of the German label Music Maniac Records, and toured Europe successfully. Not until the mid-1990s did they tour the United States. Much of their following was in Europe.

A U.S. filmmaking team consisting of Kate Fix and Jason Summers produced a 2004 documentary, Unknown Passage: The Dead Moon Story, which played in independent theaters in the U.S. and New Zealand and at the Melbourne International Film Fest, and was later released on DVD in fall 2006. Dead Moon has recorded for labels such as Empty Records, but most releases are on Music Maniac worldwide and Tombstone in the U.S. The Tombstone label also provided cheap mastering and duplication for other bands, serving more as a co-operative than a promotional vehicle. Though the Coles were in their fifties, they showed no signs of slowing down on their 2004 release Dead Ahead, continuing to tour until 2006, when they released the Echoes of the Past compilation.

In December 2006, near the end of the Echoes of the Past tour, Dead Moon announced that they were breaking up. Their last gig was at the Vera club in Groningen on November 26, 2006.

The Coles formed a new band called Pierced Arrows with the Portland punk musician Kelly Halliburton (whose father played in a band called Albatross with Fred Cole in 1972) of Severed Head of State, Defiance and formerly Murder Disco X. Pierced Arrows played their first show on May 18, 2007, at the Ash Street Saloon in Portland with the reformed Poison Idea.

In 2006, Andrew Loomis joined The Shiny Things, a band from Longview, Washington as the drummer. The band also featured Mark Nelson, a former member of The Wipers and Napalm Beach.

In 2013, Dead Moon reunited for a performance at the Crystal Ballroom. Following a series of reunion shows, Kelly Halliburton, drummer for Pierced Arrows, stepped in on drums for the band's final performances.

Andrew Loomis died on March 8, 2016, at the age of 54, from cancer. Fred Cole died on November 9, 2017, at the age of 69, also from cancer.

On October 5, 2017, the City of Portland, Oregon proclaimed October 5 as Dead Moon Night in recognition of the band Dead Moon.

As of 2023, Toody Cole formed her own band, 'Toody Cole and her Band,' with drummer Kelly Halliburton. The group has since performed select shows, including an appearance in Mexico City.

== Equipment ==
Dead Moon performing in Austin, Texas, 2006.

Toody is known to play a late-1960s semi-hollow Vox teardrop bass guitar, due to its shorter-scale length and ease of use. She often plays through a V-4 Ampeg and Ampeg SVT bass amp head(s) and has also used an Ampeg 4x12 Speaker Cab live. In Europe, Toody uses a VHT 2-15 Speaker cab.

Fred used a 50-watt Marshall Red Head and a Guild Thunderbird Guitar. He also had a 4x12 cab in the US and one in Europe. Fred and Toody both preferred Shure SM58 mics. Loomis mostly used a kick, snare, hat, floor tom and one ride cymbal.

== Band members ==
- Fred Cole – vocals, guitar
- Kathleen "Toody" Cole – vocals, bass
- Andrew Loomis – drums

== Discography ==
=== Studio albums ===
- In the Graveyard (1988)
- Unknown Passage (1989)
- Defiance (1990)
- Stranded in the Mystery Zone (1991)
- Strange Pray Tell (1992)
- Crack in the System (1994)
- Nervous Sooner Changes (1995)
- Destination X (1999)
- Trash & Burn (2001)
- Dead Ahead (2004)

=== Compilation albums ===
- Dead Moon Night (1990)
- Thirteen Off My Hook (1990)
- Echoes of the Past (2006)

=== Live albums ===
- Live Evil (1991)
- Hard Wired in Ljubljana (1997)
- Alive In The Unknown (2002)
- Live at The Casbah 10/21/2004 (2004)
- Dead Moon, Live at Satyricon (2015)
- What A Way To See The Old Girl Go (2017)
- Going South (2023)

=== Singles ===
- "Parchment Farm" (1988)
- "Don't Burn the Fires" (1988)
- "Black September" (1989)
- "D.O.A." (1990)
- "Over the Edge" (1991)
- "Fire in the Western World" (1992)
- "Day After Day" (1992)
- "Clouds of Dawn" (1992)
- "Dirty Noise" (1993)
- "Ricochet" (1994)
- "Sabotage" (2002)
