= Fred Cole (musician) =

American rock singer and guitarist (1948–2017)

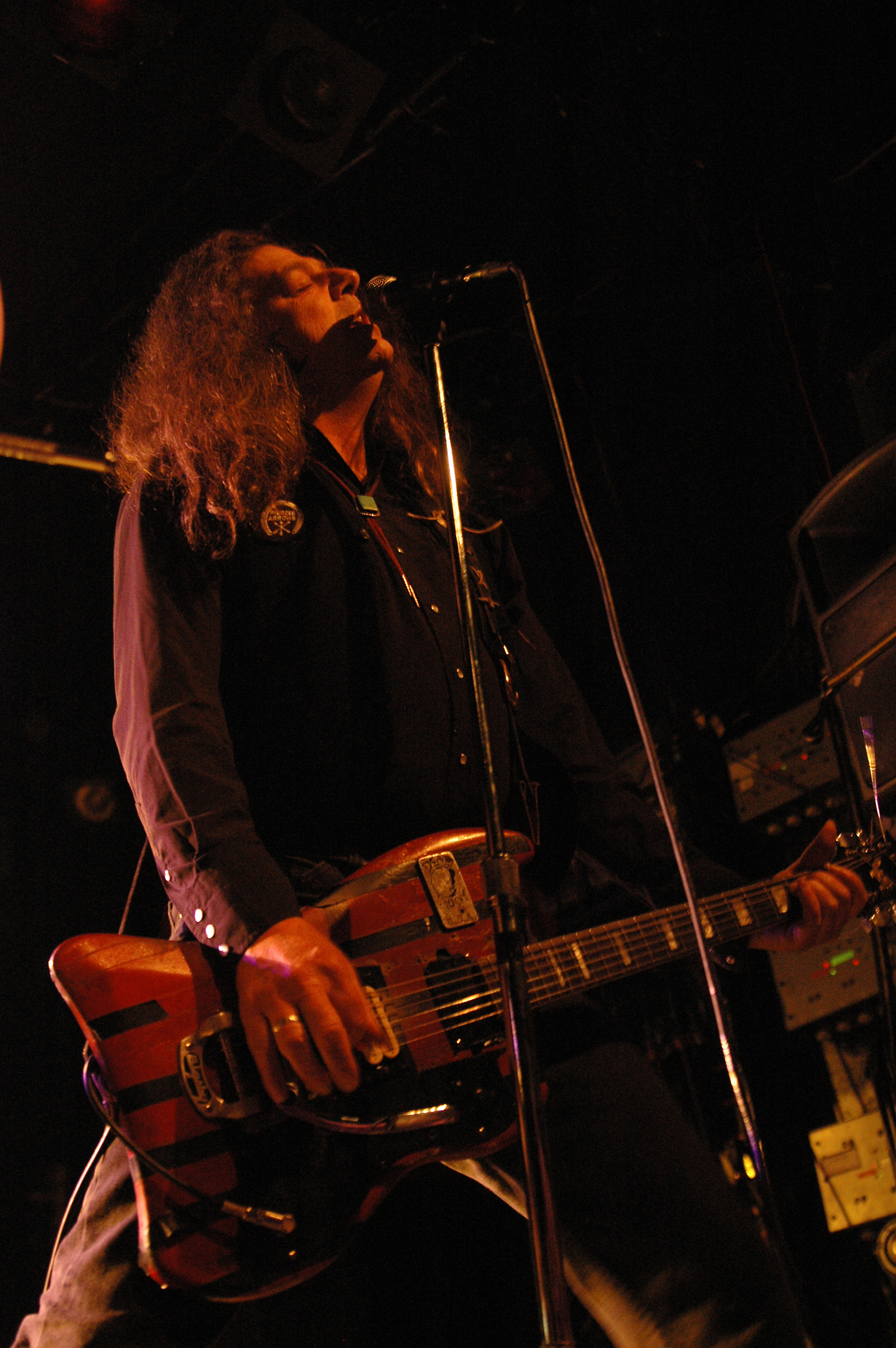
- Cole performing in 2008

Background information
- Born: Frederick Lee Cole; August 28, 1948; Tacoma, Washington, U.S.
- Origin: Las Vegas, Nevada, U.S.
- Died: November 9, 2017 (aged 69) Clackamas, Oregon, U.S.
- Genres: Punk Rock, Garage Rock, Rock and Roll
- Occupations: Musician; Songwriter
- Instruments: Vocals; Guitar
- Years active: 1964–2017
- Labels: Tombstone Records; Music Maniac; Vice; Sub Pop; Mississippi Records
- Spouse: Toody Cole (m. 1967)
- Website: www.deadmoonusa.com

Frederick Lee Cole (August 28, 1948 – November 9, 2017) was an American rock singer and guitarist who played with several bands from the 1960s until his death, most notably The Lollipop Shoppe, Dead Moon, and Pierced Arrows. He was associated mainly with the garage punk genre though he was also influenced by hard rock, blues, country, and folk music. The majority of his recorded output was self-financed and independently released on his own record label, Tombstone Records.

== Early career ==
In 1964, Cole began his recording career in Las Vegas with his band, the Lords, at the Teenbeat Club, releasing a single titled "Ain't Got No Self-Respect." His next single, from 1965, was a promo-only called "Poverty Shack" b/w "Rover," with a band named Deep Soul Cole.

== The Weeds / The Lollipop Shoppe ==
In 1966 Cole's band The Weeds gained notice in garage rock circles, and their only single, a 1960s punk track called It's Your Time (b/w Little Girl, Teenbeat Club Records), has become a collectors' favorite. The A-side appeared on one of the Nuggets anthologies. The band was promised an opening slot on a Yardbirds bill at the Fillmore in San Francisco, but on their arrival found that the venue hadn't heard of them.

Angry at management and fearing the military draft, the band decided to head up to Canada, but ran out of gas in Portland, Oregon. There, they started playing at a club called the Folk Singer, where Kathleen "Toody" Conner worked. Cole and Toody soon fell in love and were married in 1967, although The Weeds' manager insisted they keep the marriage secret.

Another manager required The Weeds to change their name to The Lollipop Shoppe because he also managed The Seeds and thought the names were too similar, and to fit the current bubblegum trend (although their 1968 LP on UNI Records (a now-defunct subsidiary of MCA), titled Just Colour, is more a mix of garage rock and the psychedelia of bands such as Love). The album and its single "You Must Be a Witch" didn't chart, but remain underground favorites. The band also released another single, "Someone I Knew" b/w "Through My Window," played many shows in San Francisco with performers such as Janis Joplin and The Doors, and had two tracks on the soundtrack LP to the film Angels from Hell. The Lollipop Shoppe broke up in 1969, but reappeared as The Weeds with another single in 1971.

== Whizeagle and Zipper ==
Frustrated with the music business and still of draft age, Cole headed for Alaska with Toody and their two young children. They got as far as the Yukon, where they homesteaded for a year. Upon their return, Cole tried unsuccessfully to secure another record deal in Los Angeles. He settled in Portland and opened a musical equipment store called Captain Whizeagle's. Taking his musical career into his own hands, he formed the hard rock band Zipper and released an LP in 1975 on his and Toody's label, Whizeagle.

== King Bee, The Rats, Western Front ==
Cole's next band, King Bee, saw him playing guitar for the first time in addition to singing. A last-minute invitation to open for The Ramones introduced them to the punk sounds of the time. They released the "Hot Pistol" single on Whizeagle in 1978, but soon broke up. In an attempt to find a stable lineup, Cole taught Toody to play bass and they formed The Rats. Their self-titled debut was released in 1980 on Whizeagle. Intermittent Signals followed in 1981, and 1983 saw the release of the third LP, In a Desperate Red. After losing three drummers, and tired of the macho direction the punk scene had taken, Cole disbanded The Rats and began an old-time country band called The Western Front. They released only two singles, "Orygun" b/w "Clementine" and "Stampede" b/w "Looking Back at Me" in 1985, but they influenced many local punkers to develop an interest in country-rock and rockabilly.

== The Range Rats and Dead Moon ==
Toody, who had occasionally performed with The Western Front and recorded a single with them, rejoined Cole for another country-influenced project, The Range Rats, in 1986. Drummer Andrew Loomis auditioned for this band, but it didn't work out, so Cole and Toody carried on with a drum machine. In 1987, while returning from Reno (their favorite vacation spot), Cole and Toody decided they wanted to play rock 'n' roll again. They called Andrew Loomis, who was a better fit for this project, and Dead Moon was born.

Dead Moon's music is a blend of dark '60s garage with punk rock; It was described by Robert Christgau as sounding "like the 13th Floor Elevators without the clinical dementia". Their early records, In the Graveyard, Unknown Passage, and Defiance, appeared on the band's own Tombstone Records, named for the music store Cole and Toody operated in Clackamas, Oregon. Cole mastered these records on a mono lathe from the 1950s that had been used for The Kingsmen's version of "Louie Louie". These releases helped them gain cult followings around the United States and in Europe, especially in Germany, home of their European record label Music Maniac.

== Pierced Arrows and documentary ==
After releasing "Dead Ahead" and touring Europe, Dead Moon broke up in 2006, and, with a new drummer, Kelly Halliburton, Fred and Toody formed the band Pierced Arrows.

In 2004 U.S. documentary filmmaking couple (Jason Summers and Kate Fix) produced Unknown Passage: The Dead Moon Story.

== Death ==
Fred Cole died in November 2017 at the age of 69, from liver disease.
