= Poison Idea =

American hardcore punk band

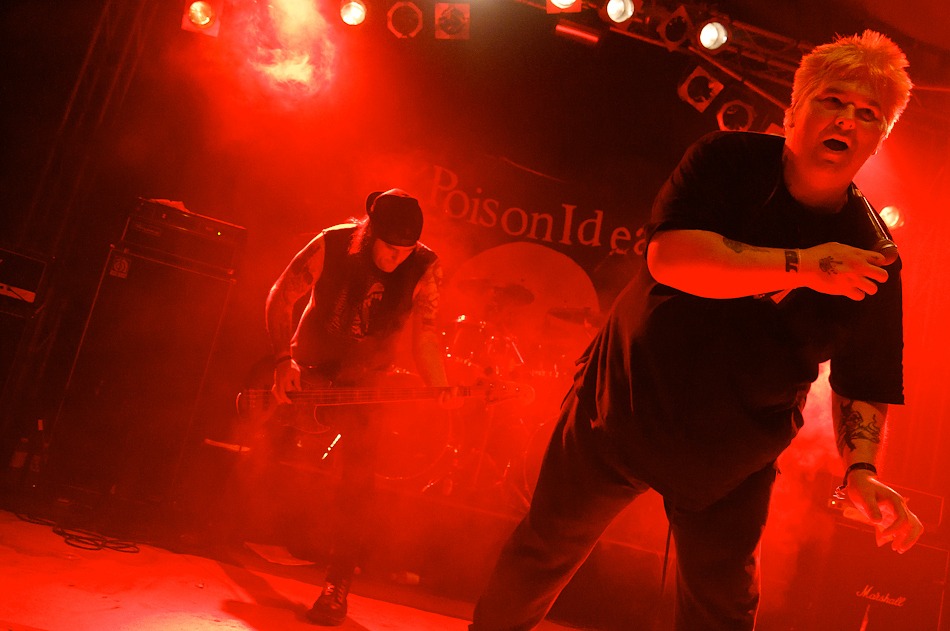
- Poison Idea performing in Germany, 2012

Background information
- Origin: Portland, Oregon, U.S.
- Genre: Hardcore punk
- Years active: 1980–1993, 1998–2017, 2018–2019
- Labels: Fatal Erection; Pusmort Records; Your Choice; Alchemy; American Leather; TKO; Southern Lord
- Members: Jerry A (vocals); Jeff Walter (guitar); Brandon Bentley (guitar); Chris "Spider" Carey (bass); Mickey Widmer (drums)
- Past members: See below
- Website: Poison Idea on Facebook

Poison Idea was an American hardcore punk band formed in Portland, Oregon, in 1980.

== History ==
The group's logo

=== Formation, 1980s, and 1990s ===
Poison Idea was formed in 1980 by vocalist Jerry A. (aka Jerry Lang). The initial lineup consisted of Jerry A., Chris Tense (bass), and Henry Bogdan (later of Helmet) on drums. Jerry described this early version of the band, in which he sang and played sax, as a "kind of PIL thing" and only lasted a few shows. Jerry and Tense (now on guitar) then hooked up with Glen Estes (bass), and Dean Johnson (drums). Inspired by Black Flag and other early Southern California hardcore acts, they were further influenced by Discharge and Los Angeles's Germs. Germs singer Darby Crash's influence on singer Jerry A., vocally, lyrically, and philosophically, was considerable, and Poison Idea followed the Germs' extremist punk ethic. Tense was replaced within a year by Tom "Pig Champion" Roberts (guitar), formerly of the Imperialist Pigs, but Tense would soon return to the band, this time on bass, replacing Glen Estes (later of Portland, Oregon punk/metal band Final Warning).

Poison Idea's debut, 1983's Pick Your King EP, was a short, lo-fi blast of hardcore fury. The jacket featured a "choice" of two kings, Jesus (front cover) and Elvis Presley (back cover).

In 1984, the group released the Record Collectors Are Pretentious Assholes 12-inch (the cover features Pig Champion's substantial vinyl collection). The record found the band incorporating subtle rock elements into their music, which was further honed on their contributions to two 1985 compilations, "Laughing Boy" on the Drinking is Great EP (on which appeared other Oregon punk bands Final Warning, Lockjaw and E-13), and "Typical" and "Die on Your Knees" on the Cleanse the Bacteria LP (compiled by Pushead for his own Pusmort label).

With the release of 1986's Kings of Punk LP, Poison Idea had fully moved beyond their early records to a more intricate hardcore/hard rock fusion that incorporated the accessibility of hard rock without sacrificing the parts of hardcore.

Following the release of Kings of Punk, the lineup changed again and the band added lead guitarist Eric "Vegetable" Olson and drummer Steve "Thee Slayer Hippy" Hanford from local thrash metal band Mayhem. The band then released War All the Time (named for the Charles Bukowski book) in 1987. After the release of War All The Time, Chris Tense departed and was replaced by Craig "Mondo" Lower, also formerly of Mayhem. War All the Time and the EPs that followed (the Getting the Fear 12-inch and the Filthkick 7-inch) found them further developing the rock/hardcore sound first established on Kings of Punk, which they would hone in 1990 with Feel the Darkness.

Membership in Poison Idea continued to fluctuate. Mondo and Vegetable departed. Charley "Myrtle Tickner" Nims joined on bass and on second guitar there was, briefly, Kevin "Kid Cocksman" Sanders and then Aldine Strichnine. They also established their own record label in 1989, American Leather (named for the Germs song), and released two records the same year: a reissue of their 1982 demo Darby Crash Rides Again and the Discontent 7-inch.

In 1990, the band released Feel the Darkness. After the album's release, Aldine Strycnine was thrown out of the band, and Mondo returned, this time on guitar, for the 1991 tour. Poison Idea then released Blank Blackout Vacant in 1992, and We Must Burn in 1993. By this time, their drinking habits and hard living were beginning to catch up with them: the band weighed in at about 1,300 lb. collectively, and Pig Champion in particular was struggling with his weight, often having to play sitting down. After the release of We Must Burn, Pig Champion announced he was no longer willing to tour. The band's final hometown show with Pig Champion was recorded and released as the Pig's Last Stand CD by Sub Pop in 1996. The group continued on briefly as a 4-piece (as documented on the 1995 Your Choice Live release) before calling it quits. Jerry and Thee Slayer Hippy would soon form a short-lived band with Jerry's wife, May May Del Castro, called The Gift. A few years later, Jerry resurrected Poison Idea with Dean Johnson, Chris Tense and new guitarist Ian Miller. This lineup appeared on 1998's Learning To Scream 7-inch but the band dissolved shortly afterwards.

=== Reformation and recent events ===
Jerry and Pig Champion resurrected Poison Idea again with new members in 2000 to record new material. This material was released in 2006 as The Latest Will and Testament LP. Prior to the album's release, on the night of January 30, 2006, guitarist Tom "Pig Champion" Roberts died in his home in Portland, Oregon, at age 47.

On October 6, 2008, Portland police arrested Steve "Thee Slayer Hippy" Hanford, 39, in connection with a string of pharmacy robberies in late summer.

In 2015, Poison Idea released the LP Confuse & Conquer on Southern Lord Records. The album featured the return of former guitarist Eric "Vegetable" Olsen and is, as of 2022, their last studio LP.

After a 19 month absence, the band returned for one show on July 21, 2018, at the Bossanova Ballroom in Portland, Oregon. It was in celebration of the release of Feel the Darkness 28 years prior. A remixed and remastered album including B-sides, outtakes, alternate mixes, plus Live in London, has been re-issued by American Leather / TKO Records.

In December 2018, Metallica performed a cover of Poison Idea's "Taken By Surprise," a track from Feel the Darkness.

It was stated that in Portland, at the Northwest Hesh Fest, September 19–21, 2019, the band would, "reportedly play their last-ever hometown show."

Steven "Thee Slayer Hippy" Hanford, the band's former drummer, died of heart attack at age 50 on May 22, 2020.

In 2022, Jerry A. Lang released a three-part autobiography entitled Black Heart Fades Blue through Rare Bird Books.

== Members ==
=== Last lineup ===
- Jerry A – vocals
- Jeff Walter – guitar
- Andrew "The King Slayer" Stromstad – guitar
- Chris "Spider" Carey – bass (died 2022)
- Chris Cuthbert – drums

=== Former ===
- Tom "Pig Champion" Roberts – guitar (died 2006)
- Chris Tense – bass
- Glen Estes – bass
- Dean Johnson – drums
- Henry Bogdan – drums
- Jim Taylor – guitar
- Charley "Myrtle Tickner" Nims – bass
- Steve "Thee Slayer Hippy" Hanford – drums (died 2020)
- Craig "Mondo" Lower – guitar, bass
- Kevin "Kid Cocksman" Sanders – guitar
- Aldine Strycnine – guitar
- Matt Brainard – guitar
- Ian Miller – guitar
- Andy Kessler (a.k.a. Joe Spleen) – guitar
- Rob "Rawbo Nox" Hume – bass (died 2021)
- Natalie Lucio – bass
- Gordon Scholl – drums
- Nathan "Skinny" Richardson – drums
- Alexa "Barbie" Grey – drums, live (2016)
- Eric "Vegetable" Olson – guitar
- Brandon Bentley – guitar
- Mickey Widner – drums
- Eric Roll – guitar

== Discography ==
=== Studio albums ===
- 1986 Kings of Punk LP (originally released on Pusmort Records)
- 1987 War All the Time LP (originally released on Alchemy Records (U.S.))
- 1990 Feel the Darkness LP (originally released on Vinyl Solution and American Leather)
- 1992 Blank Blackout Vacant LP (originally released on Taang Records and Vinyl Solution)
- 1993 We Must Burn LP (originally released on Vinyl Solution and Tim/Kerr)
- 2006 Latest Will and Testament CD/LP (originally released on Farewell Records / Network of Friends)
- 2015 Confuse & Conquer CD/LP (released on Southern Lord Records)

=== Singles and EPs ===
- 1983 Pick Your King 7-inch EP (Fatal Erection, American Leather, TKO Records)
- 1984 Record Collectors Are Pretentious Assholes 12-inch EP (Fatal Erection)
- 1988 Filthkick 7-inch EP (Shitfool, TKO Records)
- 1988 Getting the Fear 12-inch, 7-inch EP (Rockport, TKO Records)
- 1989 Just to Get Away 7-inch Picture Disc Single (American Leather)
- 1989 Darby Crash Rides Again 7-inch EP (American Leather, TKO Records)
- 1989 Plastic Bomb Cassette Single (self-released)
- 1990 Taken By Surprise 7-inch (Sub Pop)
- 1990 Discontent 7-inch (American Leather)
- 1991 Punish Me 7-inch, 12-inch & CD EP (Vinyl Solution, American Leather)
- 1991 Dead Boy – A Tribute to Stiv w/ Jeff Dahl, 7-inch Single (Triple X Records)
- 1991 Official Bootleg 2×7″ EP (Vinyl Solution, American Leather)
- 1992 Return of the Rat/Up Front w/ Nirvana 7-inch (Tim/Kerr)
- 1993 Religion & Politics Part 1 & 2 2×7″, 10-inch & CD EP (Insipid Vinyl, Tim/Kerr)
- 1993 Single at X-mas w/ Ray & Grover 7-inch Single (Tim/Kerr)
- 1993 Split Single w/ Babes In Toyland 7-inch Single (Insipid Vinyl)
- 1993 Feel the Darkness (Remix) 7-inch Single (Dirter Promotions)
- 1998 Learning to Scream 7-inch EP (Taang! Records)
- 2007 Bipolar Hardcore Split 7-inch Picture Disc Single w/ Kill Your Idols (TKO Records)
- 2013 2013 Black Friday X-mas Split w/Angry Snowmans 7-inch Single (TKO Records)
- 2014 Triple Chocolate Penetration 7-inch Single RECORD STORE DAY 2014 (Voodoo Donut)
- 2014 The Badge w/ Pantera Split 7-inch Single RECORD STORE DAY 2014 (Rhino Records)
- 2015 Rövsvett 7-inch (Just 4 Fun)
- 2016 Calling All Ghosts 12-inch (American Leather)
- 2016 Something Better Single (self-released)

=== Collections ===
- 1988 Get Loaded and Fuck Cassette (self-released) - reissued as "Ian MacKaye" in 1989
- 1992 Pajama Party Covers Album Picture Disc & LP (Vinyl Solution, Tim/Kerr)
- 1993 Dysfunctional Songs for Codependent Addicts CD (Tim/Kerr)
- 1994 The Early Years CD (Bitzcore)
- 2000 Best of Poison Idea CD (Taang! Records)
- 2002 Kings of Punk / Record Collectors Are Pretentious Assholes CD (Rhythm Vicar)
- 2005 Pick Your King / Learning to Scream LP (Reflex/Wolfpack)
- 2017 Legacy of Dysfunction LP (American Leather Records)

=== Kings of Punk reissue series ===
- 2011 Darby Crash Rides Again: The Early Years demos and rarities collection CD/LP (TKO Records & Southern Lord Records)
- 2012 The Fatal Erection Years collection of rarities and early releases CD/LP (TKO Records & Southern Lord Records)
- 2013 Kings of Punk expanded reissue 2×CD/2×LP (TKO Records & Southern Lord Records)
- 2016 Latest Will And Testament 10th Anniversary reissue CD/LP (TKO Records & American Leather Records)
- 2016 War All The Time reissue CD/LP (TKO Records & American Leather Records)
- 2018 Feel The Darkness expanded reissue 2×LP (TKO Records & American Leather Records)
- 2019 Pig's Last Stand reissue 2×LP & DVD (TKO Records & American Leather Records)
- 2020 Blank Blackout Vacant expanded reissue 2×LP (TKO Records & American Leather Records)

=== Live recordings ===
- 1991 Live in Vienna 7-inch EP (American Leather)
- 1991 Dutch Courage LP & CD (Bitzcore)
- 1992 Keep Warm, Burn the Rich 7-inch EP (Bootleg)
- 1993 Record Bootleggers Are Potential Millionaires LP (Bootleg)
- 1995 Your Choice Live Series LP & CD (Your Choice Records)
- 1996 Pig's Last Stand LP & CD (Sub Pop)

== See also ==
- Venomous Concept
