= The Essential Alan Parsons Project =

Greatest hits album by the Alan Parsons Project
- Released: 6 February 2007
- Genre: Progressive rock
- Length: 153:17 (2-disc version); 220:29 (3-disc version)
- Labels: Legacy; Arista; Sony Music Entertainment; Sony BMG
- Producers: Alan Parsons; Eric Woolfson

The Alan Parsons Project chronology
The Best of The Alan Parsons Project (2002)	The Essential Alan Parsons Project (2007)	The Sicilian Defence (2014)

Professional ratings
Review scores
Source	Rating
AllMusic	(2-disc version)
AllMusic	(3-disc version)

The Essential Alan Parsons Project is a compilation album released by English progressive rock musician Alan Parsons and the Alan Parsons Project on 6 February 2007. It was released through Sony BMG as part of The Essential album series. The album featured some of the band's best known songs as well as some rare tracks.

The album includes songs from all their studio albums, from Tales of Mystery and Imagination to Gaudi, with the exception of the band's final album, Freudiana.

== Track listing ==
All songs written by Alan Parsons and Eric Woolfson, except where noted.

=== Two-disc version ===
Disc 1
No.	Title	Originally from	Length
1.	"The Raven"	Tales of Mystery and Imagination (1976)	4:06
2.	"(The System of) Doctor Tarr and Professor Fether"	Tales of Mystery and Imagination	4:16
3.	"To One in Paradise"	Tales of Mystery and Imagination	4:38
4.	"I Robot" (edit)	I Robot (1977)	5:15
5.	"I Wouldn't Want to Be Like You"	I Robot	3:23
6.	"Some Other Time"	I Robot	4:02
7.	"Day After Day (The Show Must Go On)"	I Robot	3:43
8.	"What Goes Up..."	Pyramid (1978)	3:30
9.	"The Eagle Will Rise Again"	Pyramid	4:19
10.	"In the Lap of the Gods"	Pyramid	5:25
11.	"Lucifer" (edit)	Eve (1979)	4:18
12.	"Damned If I Do"	Eve	4:52
13.	"Games People Play"	The Turn of a Friendly Card (1980)	4:24
14.	"Time"	The Turn of a Friendly Card	5:05
15.	"The Turn of a Friendly Card (Part 1)"	The Turn of a Friendly Card	2:45
16.	"The Turn of a Friendly Card: Snake Eyes"	The Turn of a Friendly Card	3:15
17.	"The Turn of a Friendly Card: The Ace of Swords"	The Turn of a Friendly Card	2:58
18.	"The Turn of a Friendly Card: Nothing Left to Lose"	The Turn of a Friendly Card	4:06
19.	"The Turn of a Friendly Card (Part 2)"	The Turn of a Friendly Card	3:21
Total length:			77:50

Disc 2
No.	Title	Originally from	Length
1.	"Sirius"	Eye in the Sky (1982)	1:54
2.	"Eye in the Sky"	Eye in the Sky	4:36
3.	"Silence and I"	Eye in the Sky	7:20
4.	"Old and Wise"	Eye in the Sky	4:55
5.	"Mammagamma"	Eye in the Sky	3:35
6.	"Prime Time"	Ammonia Avenue (1984)	5:03
7.	"Ammonia Avenue"	Ammonia Avenue	6:33
8.	"Don't Answer Me"	Ammonia Avenue	4:04
9.	"Let's Talk About Me"	Vulture Culture (1984)	4:29
10.	"Days Are Numbers (The Traveller)"	Vulture Culture	4:27
11.	"No Answers Only Questions"	previously unreleased, from Vulture Culture sessions	2:10
12.	"Stereotomy"	Stereotomy (1985)	7:15
13.	"Limelight"	Stereotomy	4:39
14.	"La Sagrada Familia"	Gaudi (1987)	8:47
15.	"Standing on Higher Ground"	Gaudi	5:48
Total length:			75:43

=== Three-disc version ===
Disc 1
No.	Title	Originally from	Length
1.	"The Raven"	Tales of Mystery and Imagination (1976)	4:06
2.	"The Tell-Tale Heart"	Tales of Mystery and Imagination	4:39
3.	"The Cask of Amontillado"	Tales of Mystery and Imagination	4:27
4.	"To One in Paradise"	Tales of Mystery and Imagination	4:38
5.	"I Robot" (edit)	I Robot (1977)	5:15
6.	"I Wouldn't Want to Be Like You"	I Robot	3:23
7.	"Some Other Time"	I Robot	4:02
8.	"Don't Let It Show"	I Robot	4:20
9.	"Day After Day (The Show Must Go On)"	I Robot	3:43
10.	"What Goes Up..."	Pyramid (1978)	3:30
11.	"The Eagle Will Rise Again"	Pyramid	4:19
12.	"Can't Take It with You"	Pyramid	5:06
13.	"In the Lap of the Gods"	Pyramid	5:25
14.	"Shadow of a Lonely Man"	Pyramid	5:34
15.	"Lucifer" (edit)	Eve (1979)	4:18
16.	"Damned If I Do"	Eve	4:52
17.	"If I Could Change Your Mind"	Eve	5:50
Total length:			77:27

Disc 2
No.	Title	Originally from	Length
1.	"Games People Play"	The Turn of a Friendly Card (1980)	4:24
2.	"Time"	The Turn of a Friendly Card	5:05
3.	"The Gold Bug"	The Turn of a Friendly Card	4:34
4.	"The Turn of a Friendly Card (Part 1)"	The Turn of a Friendly Card	2:45
5.	"The Turn of a Friendly Card: Snake Eyes"	The Turn of a Friendly Card	3:15
6.	"The Turn of a Friendly Card: The Ace of Swords"	The Turn of a Friendly Card	2:58
7.	"The Turn of a Friendly Card: Nothing Left to Lose"	The Turn of a Friendly Card	4:06
8.	"The Turn of a Friendly Card (Part 2)"	The Turn of a Friendly Card	3:21
9.	"Sirius"	Eye in the Sky (1982)	1:54
10.	"Eye in the Sky"	Eye in the Sky	4:36
11.	"Silence and I"	Eye in the Sky	7:20
12.	"Psychobabble"	Eye in the Sky	4:53
13.	"Mammagamma"	Eye in the Sky	3:35
14.	"Old and Wise"	Eye in the Sky	4:55
15.	"Pipeline"	Ammonia Avenue (1984)	3:58
16.	"Ammonia Avenue"	Ammonia Avenue	6:32
17.	"No Answers Only Questions"	previously unreleased, from Vulture Culture sessions	2:10
Total length:			70:21

Disc 3
No.	Title	Originally from	Length
1.	"Don't Answer Me"	Ammonia Avenue	4:04
2.	"Prime Time"	Ammonia Avenue	5:03
3.	"Let's Talk About Me"	Vulture Culture (1985)	4:27
4.	"Separate Lives" (alternate mix)	Vulture Culture	4:19
5.	"Days Are Numbers (The Traveller)"	Vulture Culture	4:27
6.	"Sooner or Later"	Vulture Culture	4:27
7.	"Hawkeye"	Vulture Culture	3:48
8.	"Stereotomy"	Stereotomy (1985)	6:49
9.	"Limelight"	Stereotomy	4:39
10.	"Where's the Walrus?"	Stereotomy	7:25
11.	"La Sagrada Familia" (edit)	Gaudi (1987)	7:29
12.	"Closer to Heaven"	Gaudi	5:55
13.	"Standing on Higher Ground"	Gaudi	5:48
14.	"Paseo de Gracia"	Gaudi	3:40
Total length:			72:20

== Personnel ==
- Alan Parsons – production, engineering, composer
- Eric Woolfson – vocals, keyboards, composer, lyrics
- Ian Bairnson – guitars
- David Paton – bass
- Stuart Tosh – drums
- Lenny Zakatek – vocals
- Stuart Elliott – drums
- Chris Rainbow – vocals
- Mel Collins – saxophone

== Charts ==
Chart performance for The Essential Alan Parsons Project
Chart (2017)	Peak position
New Zealand Albums (RMNZ)	5

== Release history ==
Release history and formats for The Essential Alan Parsons Project
Country	Date	Label	Format	Catalog
Australia	2007	Sony BMG Music Entertainment	CD, Music download	88697043372
