= The Alan Parsons Project discography =

- Studio albums: 11
- Compilation albums: 18
- Singles: 38
- Music videos: 9

The following is the complete discography of The Alan Parsons Project. Over the years they have released 11 studio albums, 14 compilation albums and 38 singles.

== Albums ==
=== Studio albums ===
Title	Album details	Peak chart positions											Certifications
Title	Album details	UK	AUS	AUT	CAN	GER	NED	NZ	NOR	SWE	SWI	US	Certifications
Tales of Mystery and Imagination	Released: April 1976; Label: Charisma (#CDS-4003); Formats: LP	56	45	—	81	11	—	7	—	—	—	38	BPI: Silver; BVMI: Platinum; MC: Platinum
I Robot	Released: 8 July 1977; Label: Arista (#AL-7002); Formats: LP, CS	26	10	23	11	2	13	2	—	24	—	9	BPI: Silver; BVMI: Gold; MC: 2× Platinum; RIAA: Platinum
Pyramid	Released: 26 May 1978; Label: Arista (#AB-4108); Formats: LP, CS	49	16	17	25	3	23	4	13	22	—	26	BVMI: Platinum; MC: 2× Platinum; RIAA: Gold; RMNZ: Gold
Eve	Released: 27 August 1979; Label: Arista (#AL-9504); Formats: LP, CS, 8-track	74	14	2	10	1	40	4	6	10	—	13	BVMI: Gold; MC: Platinum; RIAA: Gold; RMNZ: Gold
The Turn of a Friendly Card	Released: 7 November 1980; Label: Arista (#AL-9518); Formats: LP, CS	38	24	2	16	2	17	18	11	22	—	13	BVMI: Gold; MC: 2× Platinum; RIAA: Platinum; RMNZ: Gold
Eye in the Sky	Released: May 1982; Label: Arista (#AL-9599); Formats: LP, CS	27	4	1	3	1	4	3	3	8	—	7	BPI: Silver; ARIA: Platinum; BVMI: Gold; MC: 2× Platinum; RIAA: Platinum; RMNZ: Platinum
Ammonia Avenue	Released: 20 February 1984; Label: Arista (#AL8-8204); Formats: LP, CS	24	16	5	29	1	1	8	5	8	1	15	BVMI: Gold; MC: Gold; RIAA: Gold
Vulture Culture	Released: 5 February 1985; Label: Arista (#PD-8263); Formats: LP, CS, CD	40	32	10	25	1	3	15	9	7	2	46	BVMI: Gold; MC: Gold
Stereotomy	Released: 19 December 1985; Label: Arista (#AL9-8384); Formats: LP, CS, CD	—	50	15	32	15	13	49	8	21	13	43	BVMI: Silver
Gaudi	Released: 10 January 1987; Label: Arista (#AL9-8384); Formats: LP, CS, CD	66	61	16	53	6	2	41	8	8	8	57	BVMI: Silver
The Sicilian Defence	Released: 23 March 2014; Label: Arista; Formats: CD	—	—	—	—	—	—	—	—	—	—	—	

=== Compilation albums ===
Title	Album details	Peak chart positions									Certifications
Title	Album details	UK	AUS	CAN	GER	NED	NZ	NOR	SWI	US	Certifications
The Best of the Alan Parsons Project	Released: 4 November 1983; Label: Arista (#205 509)	99	25	49	19	—	20	—	16	53	CAN: Gold; NZ: Gold; US: Gold
The Best of the Alan Parsons Project, Vol. 2	Released: January 1988; Label: Arista (#258 634)	—	—	—	—	—	—	—	—	—	
The Instrumental Works	Released: November 1988; Label: Arista (#259 237)	—	—	—	60	—	—	—	—	—	
Pop Classics	Released: September 1989; Label: EVA (#503.623)	—	—	—	—	7	—	—	—	—	
Anthology	Released: 16 December 1991; Label: Connoisseur (#VSOP CD170)	—	—	—	—	—	—	—	—	—	
The Best of the Alan Parsons Project	Released: 1992; Label: Arista (#354 547)	—	—	—	—	—	—	12	—	—	
The Ultimate Collection	Released: June 1992; Label: EVA (#74321 102672)	—	—	—	—	32	—	—	—	—	
The Definitive Collection	Released: 1997; Label: Arista (#74321-51746)	—	—	—	—	95	—	—	—	—	
Gold Collection	Released: January 1998; Label: BMG (#34685-8)	—	—	—	49	—	—	—	—	—	
Love Songs	Released: 2002; Label: BMG (#74321 91680)	—	—	—	—	—	—	—	—	—	
The Best of the Alan Parsons Project	Released: 2002; Label: Arista (#BVCM-37344)	—	—	—	—	—	—	—	—	—	
Platinum & Gold Collection	Released: 2003; Label: BMG (#82876 52556)	—	—	—	—	—	—	—	—	—	
Ultimate	Released: 23 March 2004; Label: BMG (#82876 59212)	—	—	—	—	—	—	—	—	—	
Extended Versions: The Encore Collection	Released: 19 May 2004; Label: BMG (#75517486972)	—	—	—	—	—	—	—	—	—	
The Dutch Collection	Released: September 2006; Label: Arista (#82876-89387)	—	—	—	—	37	—	—	—	—	
The Essential	Released: 6 February 2007; Label: Sony BMG (#88697043372)	—	—	—	—	—	5	—	—	—	
The Collection	Released: 2010; Label: Camden (#88697808482)	—	—	—	—	—	—	—	—	—	
Greatest Hits	Released: 2015; Label: Arista (#88698105387)	—	—	—	—	—	—	—	—	—	
"—" denotes items that did not chart or were not released in that territory.

== Singles ==
Year	Title	Peak chart positions										Album
Year	Title	UK	AUS	AUT	BEL	CAN	GER	NED	US	US Adult	US Rock	Album
1976	"(The System of) Dr. Tarr and Professor Fether"	—	—	—	—	62	—	—	37	—	—	Tales of Mystery and Imagination
1976	"The Raven"	—	—	—	—	—	—	—	80	—	—	Tales of Mystery and Imagination
1976	"To One in Paradise"	—	—	—	—	—	—	—	108	—	—	Tales of Mystery and Imagination
1977	"I Wouldn't Want to Be Like You"	—	—	—	—	22	—	—	36	—	—	I Robot
1977	"Don't Let It Show"	—	—	—	—	71	—	—	92	—	—	I Robot
1978	"Day After Day (The Show Must Go On)"	—	—	—	—	—	—	—	—	—	—	I Robot
1978	"I Robot"	—	—	—	—	—	—	—	—	—	—	I Robot
1978	"Pyramania"	—	—	—	—	—	—	—	—	—	—	Pyramid
1978	"What Goes Up"	—	—	—	—	—	—	—	87	—	—	Pyramid
1979	"Hyper-Gamma-Spaces"	—	—	—	—	—	—	—	—	—	—	Pyramid
1979	"Lucifer"	—	—	4	—	—	8	—	—	—	—	Eve
1979	"Damned If I Do"	—	—	—	—	16	—	—	27	—	—	Eve
1980	"You Won't Be There"	—	—	—	—	—	—	—	105	—	—	Eve
1980	"You Lie Down with Dogs"	—	—	—	—	—	—	—	—	—	—	Eve
1980	"The Turn of a Friendly Card"	—	90	—	—	—	—	—	—	—	—	The Turn of a Friendly Card
1980	"Games People Play"	—	95	—	—	9	—	—	16	—	—	The Turn of a Friendly Card
1980	"The Gold Bug"	—	—	15	—	—	40	—	—	—	—	The Turn of a Friendly Card
1981	"Time"	—	—	—	—	30	—	—	15	10	—	The Turn of a Friendly Card
1981	"Snake Eyes"	—	—	—	—	—	—	—	67	—	47	The Turn of a Friendly Card
1982	"Eye in the Sky"	—	22	—	—	1	38	—	3	3	11	Eye in the Sky
1982	"You're Gonna Get Your Fingers Burned"	—	—	—	—	—	—	—	—	—	22	Eye in the Sky
1982	"Psychobabble"	—	—	—	—	—	—	—	57	—	54	Eye in the Sky
1982	"Old and Wise"	74	—	—	31	—	—	19	—	—	—	Eye in the Sky
1983	"You Don't Believe"	—	—	—	—	43	—	—	54	—	12	The Best of the Alan Parsons Project
1984	"Don't Answer Me"	58	43	—	8	22	7	10	15	4	15	Ammonia Avenue
1984	"Prime Time"	—	—	—	—	—	69	—	34	10	3	Ammonia Avenue
1985	"Let's Talk About Me"	—	—	—	—	89	32	40	56	—	10	Vulture Culture
1985	"Days Are Numbers (The Traveller)"	—	—	—	—	—	—	—	71	11	30	Vulture Culture
1985	"Vulture Culture"	—	—	—	—	—	—	—	—	—	—	Vulture Culture
1986	"Stereotomy"	—	—	—	—	—	—	—	82	—	5	Stereotomy
1986	"Limelight"	—	—	—	—	—	—	—	—	—	—	Stereotomy
1987	"Standing on Higher Ground"	—	—	—	—	—	—	—	—	—	3	Gaudi
1990	"Freudiana"	—	—	—	—	—	—	—	—	—	—	Freudiana
"—" denotes items that did not chart or were not released in that territory.

== Music videos ==
- "I Wouldn't Want to Be Like You" (1977)
- "What Goes Up" (1978)
- "Lucifer" (1979)
- "Turn of a Friendly Card" (1980)
- "Games People Play" (1980)
- "Time" (1980)
- "The Gold Bug" (1981)
- "Don't Answer Me" (1984)
- "Prime Time" (1984)
- "Sirius/Eye in the Sky" (features clips from Nineteen Eighty-Four) (1984)
- "Let's Talk About Me" (1985)
- "Stereotomy" (1986)
- "Standing on Higher Ground" (1987)
- "Freudiana" (1990)

== Live ==
- "The Alan Parsons Project at Night of the Proms" (1990)
- "The Alan Parsons Project Live" (1994)
- "Alan Parsons Project : The Very Best Live" (1995)
- "Eye to Eye : Live in Madrid" (2004)

== See also ==
- Ladyhawke soundtrack, composed by Andrew Powell and produced by Parsons
- Freudiana, started production as an Alan Parsons Project album
- Alan Parsons discography
- Eric Woolfson solo discography
