= The Definitive Collection (Alan Parsons album) =

Greatest hits album by The Alan Parsons Project
- Released: 1997
- Recorded: April 1975 – August 1993
- Genre: Progressive rock
- Length: 2:28:37
- Label: Arista Records

Professional ratings
Review scores
Source	Rating
Allmusic	4.5/5 stars

The Definitive Collection is a 1997 2 CD compilation by The Alan Parsons Project, released through Arista Records. The American version begins with two songs from the Alan Parsons Project's first album, Tales of Mystery and Imagination, which was released on 20th Century Fox Records in the U.S. and Charisma Records in the U.K., prior to the band signing to Arista. The European version of the compilation does not include them. Both versions close with two tracks from Alan Parsons' first solo album, Try Anything Once.

== Track listing ==
All tracks are written by Alan Parsons & Eric Woolfson, except where noted.

Disc One
No.	Title	Original Album	Length
1.	"(The System of) Dr. Tarr and Professor Fether"	Tales of Mystery and Imagination	4:22
2.	"The Raven"	Tales of Mystery and Imagination	4:08
3.	"I Robot"	I Robot	6:02
4.	"I Wouldn't Want to Be Like You"	I Robot	3:23
5.	"Breakdown"	I Robot	3:51
6.	"Don't Let It Show"	I Robot	4:26
7.	"Voyager"	Pyramid	2:25
8.	"What Goes Up"	Pyramid	3:31
9.	"The Eagle Will Rise Again"	Pyramid	4:21
10.	"Can't Take it With You"	Pyramid	5:07
11.	"Pyramania"	Pyramid	2:44
12.	"Damned If I Do"	Eve	4:54
13.	"Lucifer"	Eve	5:03
14.	"If I Could Change Your Mind"	Eve	5:51
15.	"The Turn of a Friendly Card (Part 1)"	The Turn of a Friendly Card	2:43
16.	"Snake Eyes"	The Turn of a Friendly Card	3:18
17.	"Games People Play"	The Turn of a Friendly Card	4:25
18.	"Time"	The Turn of a Friendly Card	5"05

Disc Two
No.	Title	Writer(s)	Original Album	Length
1.	"Sirius"		Eye in the Sky	1:57
2.	"Eye in the Sky"		Eye in the Sky	4:36
3.	"Psychobabble"		Eye in the Sky	4:51
4.	"Mammagamma"		Eye in the Sky	3:34
5.	"Old and Wise"		Eye in the Sky	4:57
6.	"Prime Time"		Ammonia Avenue	5:03
7.	"Don't Answer Me"		Ammonia Avenue	4:13
8.	"You Don't Believe"		Ammonia Avenue	4:26
9.	"Let's Talk About Me"		Vulture Culture	4:29
10.	"Days Are Numbers (The Traveller)"		Vulture Culture	4:27
11.	"Stereotomy"		Stereotomy	7:03
12.	"In the Real World"		Stereotomy	4:19
13.	"Standing on Higher Ground"		Gaudi	5:47
14.	"Too Late"		Gaudi	4:32
15.	"Turn it Up"	Ian Bairnson	Try Anything Once (Alan Parsons solo)	6:13
16.	"Re-Jigue"	Parsons, Andrew Powell	Try Anything Once	2:31
Total length:				2:28:37
