= The Best of the Alan Parsons Project, Volume 2 =

The Best of the Alan Parsons Project, Vol. 2

Compilation album by The Alan Parsons Project
- Released: January 1988
- Genre: Progressive rock
- Label: Arista
- Producer: Alan Parsons; Eric Woolfson

The Alan Parsons Project chronology
Gaudi (1987)	The Best of the Alan Parsons Project, Vol. 2 (1988)	The Instrumental Works (1988)

Professional ratings
Review scores
Source	Rating
AllMusic	4.5/5 stars

The Best of the Alan Parsons Project, Vol. 2 is a 1988 greatest hits compilation by The Alan Parsons Project.

== US Track listing ==
All tracks are written by Alan Parsons and Eric Woolfson

No.	Title	Album	Length
1.	"Prime Time" (single edit)	Ammonia Avenue	3:48
2.	"Let's Talk About Me" (single edit)	Vulture Culture	3:37
3.	"Standing on Higher Ground" (single edit)	Gaudi	4:22
4.	"Stereotomy" (single edit)	Stereotomy	4:26
5.	"Don't Answer Me"	Ammonia Avenue	4:10
6.	"Limelight"	Stereotomy	4:38
7.	"I Robot"	I Robot	6:00
8.	"What Goes Up..." (single edit)	Pyramid	3:24
9.	"Days Are Numbers (The Traveller)" (single edit)	Vulture Culture	4:08
10.	"Ammonia Avenue"	Ammonia Avenue	6:32
11.	"The Turn of a Friendly Card, Pt. 2"	The Turn of a Friendly Card	3:20
Total length:			48:25
