= Snake Eyes (The Alan Parsons Project song) =

Single by The Alan Parsons Project

from the album The Turn of a Friendly Card
- Released: October 1981
- Recorded: Late 1979 to January 1980
- Genre: Progressive rock
- Length: 3:12
- Label: Arista
- Songwriters: Alan Parsons, Eric Woolfson
- Producer: Alan Parsons

The Alan Parsons Project singles chronology
"Time" (1981)	"Snake Eyes" (1981)	"Eye in the Sky" (1982)

"Snake Eyes" is a song by British progressive rock duo The Alan Parsons Project from the 1980 album The Turn of a Friendly Card, where it appears as the second part of the title suite. It was written by Alan Parsons and Eric Woolfson and features Chris Rainbow on lead vocals. The lyrics are from the perspective of a compulsive gambler playing craps, who doesn't intend to stop until he wins. "Snake Eyes" was released as a single in 1981 and reached No. 67 on the US Billboard Hot 100.

Eric Woolfson discussed the lyrics for "Snake Eyes" in an interview included on The Complete Audio Guide to the Alan Parsons Project, saying that, "the joke about the lyric of 'Snake Eyes' is that he's betting on something that you can't possibly win, because snake eyes is a bet which loses if seven or eleven comes up, and seven or eleven is a bet which loses if snake eyes comes up. So he's yelling 'Snake Eyes! Seven, eleven!', he wants any one of the three, and any of the three is gonna wipe him out." Portions of "Snake Eyes" feature various sound effects from casinos in Monaco, including the song's intro.

== Critical reception ==
Billboard characterised "Snake Eyes" as "a hook-laden uptempo tune with an intriguing arrangement." Record World highlighted the song's "stinging guitar" and "enchanting lead vocal". They also believed that the song's "catchy chorus will please AOR-pop listeners." Mike DeGagne of AllMusic called "Snake Eyes" "the most compelling of the five pieces" within the song suite included on The Turn of a Friendly Card and said that it "ties together the whole of the recording." PopMatters called the song a "snide little gem" that sounded like a "glamorous, Sinatra-cool ode".

== Personnel ==
- Chris Rainbow – vocals
- Ian Bairnson – guitars
- Eric Woolfson – piano
- David Paton – bass
- Stuart Elliott – drums, percussion
- All band and studio staff – chorus vocals

== Chart performance ==
Chart (1981)	Peak position
US Billboard Hot 100	67
US Mainstream Rock (Billboard)	47
