= Standing on Higher Ground =

Single by The Alan Parsons Project

from the album Gaudi
- B-side: "Paseo De Gracia (Instrumental)"
- Released: February 1987
- Recorded: October 1985 – August 1986
- Studio: The Grange; Mayfair Studios
- Length: 5:03 (original); 5:48 (2008 remaster)
- Label: Arista
- Songwriters: Eric Woolfson, Alan Parsons
- Producer: Alan Parsons

The Alan Parsons Project singles chronology
"Limelight" (1986)	"Standing on Higher Ground" (1987)

"Standing on Higher Ground" is a song by the British progressive rock duo The Alan Parsons Project from their 1986 album Gaudi, where it was included as the fourth track on the album. It was written by Alan Parsons and Eric Woolfson and features Geoff Barradale on lead vocals. "Standing on Higher Ground" was released as a single in 1987 and reached No. 3 on the US Billboard Album Rock Tracks chart.

== Background ==
During the making of "Standing on Higher Ground", Woolfson recorded a lead vocal from an unused song from the Gaudi recording sessions titled "Losing Proposition" that was imposed on the backing track of "Standing on Higher Ground". Parsons commented that Woolfson "was trying an experiment by mirroring Gaudi's own approach which was to have, in many cases, different themes intertwined in a complex pattern." A version of this recording, which also featured unused ad libbed vocals from Barradale was included on the remastered edition of Gaudi. Barradale's ad libbed vocals were ultimately replaced with multi-tracked vocal harmonies from Chris Rainbow.

"Standing on Higher Ground" was serviced to album oriented rock radio stations in January 1987 with 72 adds in its first week, making it the second most added song in that format according to Radio & Records. During the week of 16 January 1987, 77 percent of album oriented rock radio stations reporting to Radio & Records had included the song in their playlists. The song reached its peak position of No. 3 on the Billboard Album Rock Tracks chart during the week of 21 February 1987 and spent a total of 12 weeks on the listing.

The song was listed as having "significant action" on US adult contemporary radio stations by Radio & Records for the week dated 13 February 1987. By the end of the month, the song had crossed over to contemporary hit radio. Billboard called "Standing on Higher Ground" "a dreamy but energetic production number". Cashbox thought that the song demonstrated the "distinctively forward-looking vision" of The Alan Parsons Project with its "persistent rhythm, high-tech sonics [and] Parson's production wizardry". They called it a "well-crafted song" and predicted that it would be "a big hit".

A music video for "Standing on Higher Ground" was filmed in Los Angeles. The video, which was directed by Jon Small and produced by Picture Vision, depicts a video editor envisioning himself within the scenes that he is editing. The video received rotation on MTV, where it was listed as a "sneak preview video".

== Personnel ==
- Geoff Barradale – lead vocals
- Chris Rainbow – additional vocals
- Ian Bairnson – guitars
- Laurie Cottle – bass
- Richard "Trix" Cottle – synthesisers
- Stuart Elliott – drums, percussion

== Chart performance ==
Chart (1987)	Peak position
US Mainstream Rock (Billboard)	3
