= Laurence Cottle =

Welsh bass guitarist and composer (born 1961)

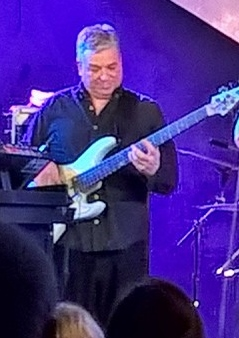
- Cottle in 2017

Background information
- Born: 16 December 1961 (age 64); Swansea, Wales
- Genres: Jazz; jazz fusion; rock; pop; funk; soul; heavy metal
- Occupations: Musician; composer
- Instrument: Bass
- Years active: 1980–present
- Website: laurencecottle.com

Laurence Cottle (born 16 December 1961) is a Welsh bass guitarist and composer.

== Career ==
Laurence Cottle's solo recordings have been mostly in jazz and jazz fusion. He was a member of the fusion quartet The Fents and appeared on their second album, The Other Side, released on the Passport Jazz label in 1987.

He played with The Alan Parsons Project on Gaudi, their final album for Arista, and on Freudiana, Parsons's final collaboration with Eric Woolfson. He is the brother of Richard Cottle (also a musician), playing with him during his time with The Alan Parsons Project.

Shortly after, he was hired by British heavy metal band Black Sabbath to play bass on the studio sessions that would become their 1989 album Headless Cross. Cottle wrote and played all the bass parts for the album and appeared on the music video for the song "Headless Cross" but didn't perform live or tour with the band.

In the 1990s, he produced three albums for guitarist Jim Mullen and recorded with British jazz musicians Mornington Lockett, Tim Garland, Django Bates, Gerard Presencer, and John Graham. In 2000, Cottle appeared on the album Iommi from Tony Iommi. From 2003 to 2006, he was a member of Bill Bruford's Earthworks. In 2009, he produced albums for Claire Martin, Gareth Williams, and Mark Nightingale. He leads his own Laurence Cottle Big Band playing a variety of standards and his own material.

Cottle has also played on Eric Clapton's 1986 album August as well as Van Morrison's Keep Me Singing and Roll with the Punches.

Cottle played in the band with Mike Oldfield at the Tubular Bells 2 live concert at Edinburgh Castle in 1992.
