= Time (The Alan Parsons Project song) =

Single by The Alan Parsons Project

from the album The Turn of a Friendly Card
- B-side: "The Gold Bug"
- Released: April 1981 (US); 31 July 1981 (UK)
- Genre: Soft rock
- Length: 5:04; 4:11 (single version)
- Label: Arista
- Songwriters: Alan Parsons, Eric Woolfson
- Producers: Alan Parsons, Eric Woolfson

The Alan Parsons Project singles chronology
"Games People Play" (1980)	"Time" (1981)	"Snake Eyes" (1981)

Music video
- "Time" on YouTube

"Time" is a song released in 1981 as a single by the Alan Parsons Project. It was from their 1980 album The Turn of a Friendly Card. In the U.S., the song peaked at No. 15 on the Billboard Hot 100. On the U.S. Adult Contemporary chart, "Time" peaked at number 10. "Time" spent two weeks at number 14 on Cashbox; the publication ranked it as the 94th biggest hit of 1981. Outside the US, the song peaked at number 30 in Canada.

== Background ==
"Time" was the first Alan Parsons Project single to feature Eric Woolfson as lead vocalist and also featured Alan Parsons's own voice. Woolfson, who had sung guide vocals on the band' other demos, insisted on singing the final vocal on "Time". Parsons recalled that he had previously resisted the idea of Woolfson singing on any material for The Alan Parsons Project and that he had "misjudged his vocal talents". He later said that Woolfson "did a great job" on the recording and expressed his belief that it was "actually a very difficult song to sing, because it goes through an enormous vocal range", citing the contrast between the notes found on the verses and the refrain as an example.

Commenting on the track, Woolfson said that "Time" represented "another form of risk taking" for the group and that the song "could have been sung by an ancient sea captain about to set off on a voyage of discovery, into uncharted territory, or equally, by a modern day astronaut setting off for some destination in space". Lenny Zakatek, who recorded with The Alan Parsons Project for The Turn of a Friendly Card, expressed his belief that Woolfson should have received a Novello award for the song "Time".

== Critical reception ==
Frank Conte of The Boston Globe dismissed the song as "cliche-ridden" and indicative of the band having "run out of ideas". Record World called it a "rich, textured ballad" that was "primed for instant pop-A/C adds". Mike DeGagne of AllMusic said that "Time" was "above and beyond any of this band's other slower material".

== Personnel ==
- Eric Woolfson – lead vocals, piano
- Alan Parsons – counterpoint vocals
- Chris Rainbow – backing vocals
- Ian Bairnson – acoustic guitars, pitch shifted guitar
- David Paton – acoustic guitars, bass
- Stuart Elliott – drums, percussion
- Andrew Powell – orchestral arrangements and conducting

== Chart history ==
=== Weekly charts ===
Chart (1981)	Peak position
Canada RPM Top Singles	30
Canada RPM Top AC	19
US Billboard Hot 100	15
US Billboard Adult Contemporary	10
US Cash Box Top 100	14

=== Year-end charts ===
Chart (1981)	Rank
US Top Pop Singles (Billboard)	48
US Cash Box	94
