= Prime Time (The Alan Parsons Project song) =

Single by The Alan Parsons Project

from the album Ammonia Avenue
- B-side: "The Gold Bug"
- Released: May 1984
- Studio: Abbey Road Studios, London England
- Genre: Pop rock
- Length: 5:03
- Label: Arista
- Songwriters: Eric Woolfson, Alan Parsons
- Producer: Alan Parsons

The Alan Parsons Project singles chronology
"Don't Answer Me" (1984)	"Prime Time" (1984)	"Let's Talk About Me" (1985)

"Prime Time" is a song by The Alan Parsons Project, the opening track to their 1984 album Ammonia Avenue. Eric Woolfson provided the lead vocals on "Prime Time" and co-wrote the song with Alan Parsons. It was released as the album's second single and became the band's final top 40 hit in the United States. A music video was created to promote the single.

== Background ==
"Prime Time" was initially distributed to album oriented rock radio in February 1984 along with the band's "Don't Answer Me". During the week dated 24 February 1984, "Prime Time" was added to 29 album oriented rock stations that reported to Radio & Records, making it one of the most added songs in that radio format. The following week, the song continued to be among the most added songs in the album oriented rock radio format, with 33 new adds. In the 17 March 1984 edition of Billboard, the publication listed "Prime Time" as a "strong single contender" from Ammonia Avenue. That same month, the song debuted at No. 18 on the Billboard Album Rock Tracks chart and ascended to its peak position of No. 3 the following week.

For the week of 11 May 1984, "Prime Time" crossed over to adult contemporary and contemporary hit radio, where it was among the most added songs in both formats. The song made continued gains the following week and remained as one of the most added songs for adult contemporary radio stations reporting to Radio & Records. By the week of 25 May 1984, 64 percent of adult contemporary stations reporting to Radio & Records had included the song in their playlists. Around this time, the song debuted at No. 30 on the Billboard Adult Contemporary chart. Billboard also reviewed the single, saying that it had a "breezy, easy quality perfect for early summer days (or nights)."

The song entered the Billboard Hot 100 during the week of 19 May 1984. By early June, 64 percent of contemporary hit radio stations reporting to Radio & Records were playing the song. The song reached its peak position of No. 34 later that month and ultimately spent a total of 11 weeks on the Hot 100.

"Prime Time" was released by Arista Records in the UK during the month of June. The 7" single included "The Gold Bug" as the B-side, with "Pipeline" and "Sirius" also included on the 12" single. By the end of the month, the song had been added to the playlists of 14 radio stations across the UK, including DevonAir, Red Rose Radio, and Swansea Sound. A few weeks later, the song was added to six additional radio stations, including some under the Capital radio network. BBC Radio 2 also picked up the song for the week dated 21 July 1984.

== Music video ==
A music video for "Prime Time" was launched on MTV in May 1984, which achieved medium rotation, indicating a maximum of three plays per day on the network. Intercontinental Televideo Inc. was responsible for converting the music video from PAL to NTSC.

== Personnel ==
- Ian Bairnson – electric and acoustic guitars
- David Paton – bass guitar
- Eric Woolfson – Wurlitzer electronic piano, lead vocals
- Stuart Elliott – drums, percussion
- Chris Rainbow – backing vocals

== Charts ==
Chart (1984)	Peak position
Canada Adult Contemporary (RPM)	20
European Airplay (Music & Media)	32
Germany (GfK)	51
US Billboard Hot 100	34
US Adult Contemporary (Billboard)	10
US Mainstream Rock (Billboard)	3
US Cashbox Top 100	33
