= Gaudi (The Alan Parsons Project album) =

1987 studio album

Studio album by The Alan Parsons Project
- Released: January 1987
- Recorded: October 1985 – August 1986
- Studios: The Grange; Mayfair Studios
- Genres: Progressive rock; symphonic rock; pop rock; new wave
- Length: 38:47
- Label: Arista
- Producers: Alan Parsons, Eric Woolfson

The Alan Parsons Project chronology
Stereotomy (1985)	Gaudi (1987)	The Sicilian Defence (2014)

Eric Woolfson and Alan Parsons albums chronology
Stereotomy (1985)	Gaudi (1987)	Freudiana (1990)

Professional ratings
Review scores
Source	Rating
AllMusic	2/5 stars

Gaudi is the tenth album by The Alan Parsons Project, released in January 1987. Gaudi refers to Antoni Gaudí, the Catalan architect behind the Sagrada Família.

This was the final canonical Alan Parsons Project studio album, as well as vocalist Lenny Zakatek's final contribution to any Parsons album. Although the album The Sicilian Defence was released in 2014, it was originally recorded in 1979 and was never intended to be heard by the public.

== Background ==
Project regular David Paton was unable to undertake bass duties on this recording due to a prior touring commitment with Elton John. Saxophonist-keyboardist Richard Cottle's brother, Laurie, was recruited to play bass. The album was recorded at the Grange in Norfolk and Mayfair Studios in London using a pair of Sony 3324 DASH digital tape recorders and mixed to a digital master.

The album was promoted with posters, streamers, and inserts using visuals from the album sleeve. To coincide with the release of Gaudi, the back catalogue of The Alan Parsons Project was reissued on CD. Arista Records also launched a promotional campaign around the slogan "Music...As It Was Meant To Be Played" and hosted a special event at the Sagrada Família. The year prior, Woolfson and Parsons had initiated a lawsuit against their Arista claiming that the label had intentionally rescinded several of the band's CDs due to a dispute over royalties. By the time that Arista had launched the ad campaign in January 1987, the lawsuit had yet to be resolved.

The pan-European publication Music & Media reported in its 17 January 1987 that the album would be released worldwide that same week. Music Week, a British trade publication, instead listed a February release date in the United Kingdom. Billboard reviewed the album in the 24 January 1987 edition of their publication, saying that it had a "detailed sound" and was the band's "most esoteric yet".

During the writing of what would have been the follow-up, Eric Woolfson turned that album into a rock opera, eventually released as Freudiana in 1990. Alan Parsons continued as a solo artist in 1993 with Try Anything Once.

A musical, based on the songs of this album, was created by Woolfson and Elmar Ottenthal. One million people saw the musical over its four-year run, with its final performance taking place in 1998.

== Use on television ==
The songs "Closer to Heaven" and "Money Talks" were used in "Red Tape", the nineteenth episode of the third season of the TV series Miami Vice; an instrumental version of "Standing on Higher Ground" was used as background music in some scenes of an episode of the sitcom Roomies.

A music video for "Standing on Higher Ground" was directed by Jon Small and produced by Picture Vision.

== Track listing ==
All tracks are written by Alan Parsons and Eric Woolfson.

Side one
No.	Title	Lead vocals	Length
1.	"La Sagrada Familia"	John Miles	8:46
2.	"Too Late"	Lenny Zakatek	4:31
3.	"Closer to Heaven"	Eric Woolfson	5:52

Side two
No.	Title	Lead vocals	Length
4.	"Standing on Higher Ground"	Geoff Barradale	5:03
5.	"Money Talks"	Miles	4:26
6.	"Inside Looking Out"	Woolfson	6:22
7.	"Paseo de Gracia"	Instrumental	3:47
Total length:			38:47

2008 remaster bonus tracks
No.	Title	Length
8.	"Too Late" (Eric Woolfson rough guide vocal)	4:13
9.	"Standing on Higher Ground/Losing Proposition" (vocal experiments)	3:58
10.	"Money Talks" (Chris Rainbow/percussion overdubs)	0:37
11.	"Money Talks" (rough mix backing track)	4:28
12.	"Closer to Heaven" (sax/Chris Rainbow overdub section)	0:50
13.	"Paseo de Gracia" (rough mix)	3:46
14.	"La Sagrada Familia" (rough mix)	7:25

== Personnel ==
- Eric Woolfson – synth piano (track 1), piano (track 3), accordion (track 3), synth rhodes (track 6), synthesizer (track 7), lead vocals (tracks 3 and 6), additional vocals (track 1)
- Alan Parsons – producer, engineer, sound FX compilation (tracks 1 and 6), computer voice programming (track 5)
- Ian Bairnson – guitars, electric and Spanish guitars (tracks 6 and 7), dialogue (track 6)
- Laurie Cottle – bass
- Richard "Trix" Cottle – synthesizers, saxophone solo (tracks 1 and 3)
- Stuart Elliott – drums, percussion (tracks 1, 3, 4, 5, 7), castanets (track 7), dancing shoes (track 7)
- John Miles – lead vocals (tracks 1 and 5)
- Lenny Zakatek – lead vocals (track 2)
- Geoff Barradale – lead vocals (track 4)
- Chris Rainbow – additional vocals (tracks 1, 4, 5), backing vocals (tracks 2, 3, 6)
- Salvador Gimenez-Oltra – dialogue (tracks 1 and 6)
- Norman Cowan – dialogue (track 6)
- Andrew Powell – orchestral arrangements (tracks 1 and 7)
- John Heley – cello (track 1)
- David Cripp – horns conductor (tracks 1 and 7)
- Bob Howes – The English Chorale conductor (track 1), timpani (tracks 1 and 7)

== Charts ==
Chart (1987)	Peak position
Australian Albums (Kent Music Report)	61
Austrian Albums (Ö3 Austria)	16
Canada Top Albums/CDs (RPM)	52
Dutch Albums (Album Top 100)	2
European Albums (Music & Media)	9
Finnish Albums (The Official Finnish Charts)	13
German Albums (Offizielle Top 100)	6
Italian Albums (Musica e Dischi)	24
Norwegian Albums (VG-lista)	8
Spanish Albums (AFE)	1
Swedish Albums (Sverigetopplistan)	8
Swiss Albums (Schweizer Hitparade)	8
UK Albums (Official Charts)	66
US Billboard 200	57

== Certifications ==
Region	Certification	Certified units/sales
Spain (Promusicae)	Gold	50,000^{^}
^{^} Shipments figures based on certification alone.

== Musical ==
Gaudi

Soundtrack album (Cast recording) by Eric Woolfson
- Released: 1995
- Recorded: 1993/1994
- Genre: Rock

Eric Woolfson chronology
Freudiana (1990)	Gaudi (1995)	Gambler (1997)

Gaudi was Eric Woolfson's second foray into the world of musical theater. It debuted in Aachen in June 1993. In 1995, a musical cast album was released on CD which, however, omitted a few tracks.

No.	Title	Length
1.	"What Are You Going To Do Now?"	5:42
2.	"Money Talks"	5:57
3.	"Closer to Heaven"	4:40
4.	"Standing on Higher Ground"	3:48
5.	"Tango Güell" (instrumental)	3:37
6.	"Parca Güell"	5:54
7.	"Puppet Master"	6:14
8.	"Inside Looking Out"	4:26
9.	"Work Song"	2:55
10.	"Too Late"	5:19
11.	"Forbidden Fruit"	6:52
12.	"Lonely Song (Love Can Be Lonely Too)"	6:19
13.	"La Sagrada Familia"	8:19

In 2021, a download version of the musical has been released featuring differing versions to the CD release and three more tracks.

No.	Title	Length
1.	"What Are You Going To Do Now?"	5:44
2.	"Money Talks"	7:53
3.	"Closer to Heaven"	4:42
4.	"Standing on Higher Ground"	3:45
5.	"Tango Güell" (instrumental)	3:43
6.	"Parca Güell"	5:56
7.	"Puppet Master"	6:42
8.	"Inside Looking Out"	4:28
9.	"Work Song"	4:21
10.	"Too Late"	5:21
11.	"Forbidden Fruit"	6:56
12.	"Lonely Song (Love Can Be Lonely Too)"	6:21
13.	"La Sagrada Familia"	8:21
14.	"Las Ramblas/It Isn't Funny If It Happens To You"	4:59
15.	"Garden of the Warriors"	4:21
16.	"Gaudi Visions"	6:04

The three bonus tracks, which are all instrumental, were originally played between the vocal numbers. Due to a mastering error, the first note of "Standing on Higher Ground" is actually at the end of "Las Ramblas/It Isn't Funny If It Happens To You", indicating that this track, which incorporates "Paseo de Gracia" from the original Alan Parsons Project album, originally preceded "Standing on Higher Ground". A vocal version of "It Isn't Funny...", again preceding "Standing on Higher Ground", was performed during the ZDF broadcast, but isn't on any audio release. The same broadcast also includes "Garden of the Warriors" following "Closer to Heaven". According to the Scene by Scene overview, "Gaudi Visions" (which is not included in the broadcast) opened the second act, preceding "Inside Looking Out".
