= Eve (Alan Parsons Project album) =

Studio album by the Alan Parsons Project
- Released: 27 August 1979
- Recorded: December 1978–June 1979
- Studio: Super Bear
- Genres: Progressive rock; symphonic rock; pop rock; new wave
- Length: 39:23
- Label: Arista
- Producer: Alan Parsons

The Alan Parsons Project chronology
Pyramid (1978)	Eve (1979)	The Turn of a Friendly Card (1980)

Singles from Eve
- 1. "Lucifer" Released: August 1979; 2. "Damned If I Do" Released: September 1979; 3. "You Won't Be There" Released: January 1980 (US); 4. "You Lie Down with Dogs" Released: March 1980 (US)

Eve is the fourth studio album by British rock duo the Alan Parsons Project, released on 27 August 1979 by Arista Records. The album's focus is on the strength and characteristics of women, and the problems they face in the world of men. It had originally been intended to focus on "great women in history", but evolved into a wider concept. The album name was the same as Eric Woolfson's mother-in-law.

Eve is the Alan Parsons Project's first album with singer Chris Rainbow. The album's opening instrumental "Lucifer" was a major hit in Europe, and "Damned If I Do" reached the US Top 40, peaking at No. 27 and reaching No. 16 in Canada. The album also reached No. 1 in West Germany, where it spent over a year on the charts. Billboard reported that it had sold 400,000 copies in West Germany by September 1979. "Lucifer" also is used as title track for the German political TV show Monitor.

== Background ==
Parsons has described the album as being "more elusive", adding that "If I were to be pinned down and asked what the album is about, I'd have to say it's simply about women."

The album features a few instances of Morse code, with the first occurring at the beginning of the album. Parsons extracted the Morse code from shortwave radio without knowing the contents of the message. He recalled that someone did translate the message for him but said that "there was nothing particularly interesting embedded in there". The name "Eve" is repeated on keyboard in morse code during this song.

The advertising campaign for Eve featured offers for a three-track sampler EP that were promoted in publications such as The Guardian, Private Eye, Melody Maker, and Evening Standard. Two different full-colour posters were also distributed to retail stores in the United Kingdom to promote the album.

Reflecting on Eve in 1986, Parsons recalled that the band received criticism for "being chauvinistic" on the album. He added that "it was, in a way, justified. The album was meant to express the two sides of woman, the unpleasant side and the pleasant, sexy, approachable side..."

== Cover art ==
The gatefold cover art for Eve by Hipgnosis features three women wearing veils (two on the front, one on the reverse), with their faces partially in shadow. The shadows and veils partially conceal disfiguring scars and sores (the lesions were not real, however). Controversy over the disfiguring of the models' faces brought comment from Eric Woolfson: "The cover seemed a mis-match to me. It was a brilliant cover from Hipgnosis, but it didn't reflect my thinking at all, or relate to what is made clear on the Record."

== Critical reception ==
Professional ratings
Review scores
Source	Rating
AllMusic	4/5 stars
Christgau's Record Guide	D
MusicHound Rock: The Essential Album Guide	3/5 stars
Smash Hits	8/10

In their review for Smash Hits, Red Starr said that Eve was "superbly produced, briskly melodic, studied but varied – a quality record and a longterm pleaser". Music Week called the album a "really enjoyable almost pop/rock offering" and predicted that it would perform better commercially than previous releases from The Alan Parsons Project in the United Kingdom. The Globe and Mail wrote that, "like its trio of predecessors, Eve has occasional moments of melodic splendor punctuated by lengthy periods of accompaniment for riding elevators".

Billboard believed that the music on Eve was "professional[,] with both rockers and ballads exhibiting orchestral and electronic influences". They also called the production "superb". Cashbox wrote that the "hypnotic, synthesized rhythms and dynamic orchestration that characterize the patented Parsons sound is at its most commercial on 'Eve'". They felt that the use of male and female vocalists resulted in a more disjoined album than some of the Alan Parsons Project's previous work, but also showcased how "multi-talented" the band was. Record World thought that the album represented a development in electronic music with its combination of "eerie jazz and dancing rhythms".

== Bonus tracks detail ==
"Elsie's theme from 'The Sicilian Defence' was from an experimental album entitled "The Sicilian Defence". Recorded at the same time as Eve, The Sicilian Defence was not released at the time. "Lucifer (Demo)" was recorded in a beachfront apartment in Monaco.

== Track listing ==
All songs written and composed by Alan Parsons and Eric Woolfson.

Side one
No.	Title	Lead vocals	Length
1.	"Lucifer"	(Instrumental)	5:09
2.	"You Lie Down with Dogs"	Lenny Zakatek	3:47
3.	"I'd Rather Be a Man"	David Paton	3:53
4.	"You Won't Be There"	Dave Townsend	3:34
5.	"Winding Me Up"	Chris Rainbow	4:04
Total length:			20:27

Side two
No.	Title	Lead vocals	Length
1.	"Damned If I Do"	Zakatek	4:50
2.	"Don't Hold Back"	Clare Torry	3:37
3.	"Secret Garden"	(Instrumental)	4:41
4.	"If I Could Change Your Mind"	Lesley Duncan	5:49
Total length:			18:57

Eve was remastered and reissued in 2008 with the following bonus tracks:

10. "Elsie's Theme from 'The Sicilian Defence' (the Project that never was)"
11. "Lucifer" (demo)
12. "Secret Garden" (early rough mix)
13. "Damned If I Do" (rough mix)
14. "Don't Hold Back" (vocal rehearsal rough mix)
15. "Lucifer" (early rough mix)
16. "If I Could Change Your Mind" (rough mix)

== Personnel ==
- Alan Parsons – guitars, autoharp, drum machine, Morse code (track 1), keyboards (track 8), production, engineering
- Eric Woolfson – clavinet (track 2), piano (tracks 2, 4–5, 9), music box (track 5), Wurlitzer (track 6), keyboards (track 8), organ (track 9), executive producer
- Duncan Mackay – synthesizers (tracks 1–3, 6), piano (track 3 and 5), music box (track 5), keyboards (track 8)
- Ian Bairnson – guitars (all tracks), backwards Wah-wah FX (track 3)
- David Paton – bass guitar (all tracks), lead vocal (track 3)
- Stuart Elliott – drums (all tracks), percussion (tracks 3 and 8)
- Lenny Zakatek – lead vocal (tracks 2 and 6)
- Dave Townsend – lead vocal (track 4)
- Clare Torry – lead vocal (track 7)
- Lesley Duncan – lead vocal (track 9)
- Chris Rainbow – backing vocals (tracks 2, 7–9), lead vocal (track 5)
- Andrew Powell – orchestral arrangements, choral arrangements, conductor
- The Orchestra of the Munich Chamber Opera care of Eberhard Schoener
  - Sandor Farkas – leader
  - Curtis Briggs – coordinator
- Shapiro and Steinberg – trivia consultants
- Hipgnosis – cover art

Two of the lead singers on the album, Clare Torry and Lesley Duncan, previously performed on Pink Floyd's The Dark Side of the Moon, which Parsons had engineered.

== Charts ==
=== Weekly charts ===
Chart (1979–1980)	Peak position
Australian Albums (Kent Music Report)	14
Austrian Albums (Ö3 Austria)	2
Canada Top Albums/CDs (RPM)	10
Dutch Albums (Album Top 100)	40
German Albums (Offizielle Top 100)	1
New Zealand Albums (RMNZ)	4
Norwegian Albums (VG-lista)	6
Spanish Albums (AFE)	4
Swedish Albums (Sverigetopplistan)	10
UK Albums (Official Charts)	74
US Billboard 200	13

=== Year-end charts ===
Chart (1979)	Position
German Albums (Offizielle Top 100)	40
New Zealand Albums (RMNZ)	49

Chart (1980)	Position
German Albums (Offizielle Top 100)	7

== Certifications ==
Region	Certification	Certified units/sales
Canada (Music Canada)	Platinum	100,000^{^}
Germany (BVMI)	Gold	400,000
New Zealand (RMNZ)	Gold	7,500^{^}
Spain (Promusicae)	Gold	50,000^{^}
United States (RIAA)	Gold	500,000^{^}
^{^} Shipments figures based on certification alone.
