= Stereotomy =

1985 album by the Alan Parsons Project

Studio album by The Alan Parsons Project
- Released: 19 December 1985
- Recorded: October 1984 – August 1985
- Studio: Mayfair Studios
- Genres: Progressive rock; pop rock; new wave
- Length: 41:58
- Label: Arista
- Producers: Alan Parsons and Eric Woolfson

The Alan Parsons Project chronology
Vulture Culture (1985)	Stereotomy (1985)	Gaudi (1987)

Alternate cover
- Re-release cover

Singles from Stereotomy
- 1. "Stereotomy" Released: 10 February 1986

Stereotomy is the ninth studio album by the Alan Parsons Project, released in December 1985 by Arista Records.

Not as commercially successful as its predecessor Vulture Culture, the album is structured differently from earlier Project albums: containing three lengthy tracks ("Stereotomy" at over seven minutes, "Light of the World" at over six minutes, and the instrumental "Where's the Walrus?" running over seven and a half minutes) and two minute-long songs at the end. It is a full digital production and both the LP and CD releases were encoded using the two-channel Ambisonic UHJ format. Stereotomy earned a Grammy nomination in 1987 – for Best Rock Instrumental Performance: Orchestra, Group, or Soloist – for the track "Where's the Walrus?"

Stereotomy marks the final appearance of David Paton on bass – he went on to join Elton John's touring band – and is the first Project release since Tales of Mystery and Imagination not to feature Lenny Zakatek.

== Background ==
The word "stereotomy" is taken from "The Murders in the Rue Morgue" by Edgar Allan Poe. It refers to the cutting of solid shapes into different forms, and is used as a metaphor for the way that famous people (singers, actors, etc.) are 'shaped' by the demands of fame. The short track "Chinese Whispers" also references "Rue Morgue" in that although an instrumental, it features Eric Woolfson’s daughters Sally and Lorna reciting a sequence of words from the story.

Prior to the recording sessions of Stereotomy, Parsons and Woolfson contacted a mutual friend who worked as a radio programmer to conduct research on what fans of the Alan Parsons Project expected from them. The radio programmer conveyed to them that fans preferred to hear less of Woolfsons' vocals and were also alienated by the band's pivot toward more commercially friendly music. In an interview published by Knight Ridder, Woolfson said that "hit singles [were] never what we set out to do" and maintained that the band's focus was more on making album-oriented rock music.

The band retained the rhythm section of Ian Bairnson on guitars, David Paton on bass, and Stuart Elliott on drums. John Miles sang lead vocals on the title track and Gary Brooker of Procol Harum covered the lead vocals on the song "Limelight".

== Recording ==
Whereas previous Alan Parsons Project albums had been recorded on analog tape and mastered digitally, Stereotomy was recorded digitally from the onset. Parsons said that they "made a major commitment to digital format in the studio, recording Stereotomy all digital from day one." The band explained that they made this decision to retain the same level of fidelity throughout the recording process, regardless of how many overdubs and playbacks were conducted. Woolfson discussed this method with Dave Zimmer of BAM magazine in 1986.

No matter how good the original tracks were, we discovered there was an actual physical deterioration of analog tapes. Just the physical process of running the tape across the heads caused a few molecules to get lost and we'd be left with something less than powerful. But with digital, we found the original excitement just never went away.

— Eric Woolfson

Woolfson's role as a lead vocalist and keyboardist was also reduced on Stereotomy. He thought that he "ended up doing too many tracks on the last couple of albums" and reckoned that his vocal contributions on Stereotomy spanned "about 30 seconds". Richard Cottle, who first worked with the Alan Parsons project on Vulture Culture, reprised his role as the band's dedicated session synthesiser player. Woolfson thought that Cottle's role was "more dominant" on Stereotomy due to the band's increasing reliance on a more synthesised sound rather than acoustic keyboards.

Cottle's keyboard rig consisted of a PPG Wave 2.3, Emulator II, Fairlight CMI, Yamaha DX7, and two Sequential Prophet 5 synthesisers that were retrofitted with a MIDI interface. Parsons believed that the strengths of the Fairlight paled in comparison to the Emulator and the Yamaha DX7, which were his preferred keyboards on the album. Cottle commented that it was "time-consuming" to operate the Fairlight and achieve sounds that were compatible with other keyboards in his setup.

Cottle primarily used the PPG Wave as his master keyboard and used the Prophet and DX7 for chordal pads. Parsons's TX Rack, which was positioned in the control room, also connected to some of Cottle's instruments, including the DX7. The Friend Chip SRC synchronizer was used to delay the feed to various instruments to overcome latency issues associated with MIDI. Cottle's keyboards mixes, which were treated with audio effects such as reverb, were sent directly to the mixing console.

== Artwork ==
The original vinyl packaging was different from all the reissues: it featured more elaborate artwork of the paper sleeve supplied with a special color-filter oversleeve. When inserted, the over-sleeve filtered some of the colors of the artwork, allowing four different variations. In the reissues, only one variant remained. The artwork was nominated for Best Album Package at the 29th Annual Grammy Awards, but lost to Miles Davis's album Tutu, designed by art director Eiko Ishioka.

== Release ==
Arista Records established a release date of 19 December 1985 for Stereotomy, which was reported in the 2 November 1985 edition of Billboard magazine. This was also established as the release date in the United Kingdom. In the United States, CD copies of Stereotomy were still in the manufacturing stage by early February 1986. The album's title track received airplay on album oriented rock radio stations and was also given a music video.

The band was involved in a dispute with Arista over royalties from CD sales. Woolfson said that the band had originally agreed to a royalty rate equivalent to that of vinyls during the nascent stages of CD marketing and that the royalty rate would increase once CDs were more established in the marketplace.

Arista and the band had signed a contract on 5 December 1985 establishing a 30-day negotiation period that allowed for royalty restructuring. After the 30 days lapsed, Woolfson insisted that the band's royalty rates would automatically increase. Woolfson told Billboard that Arista had threatened to cease production of the band's material if they did not agree to a concessionary rate, an ultimatum that the label denied, saying that "Eric Woolfson's statements are completely wrong and inaccurate. It is not appropriate for us to discuss each of the inaccurate points, except to emphasize that the Alan Parsons Project CDs are available in the marketplace."

By February 1986, an Kaz Ghavami, the local CD buyer for Tower Records, was told to "order as many Alan Parsons Project CDs as I can put in my budget" after being informed that the CDs would not be pressed for another year. Arista Records had been approached by Billboard to comment on this development and referred the publication to their previous statement. Woolfson objected to the insistence of Arista Records that the distribution of the band's compact discs had not been halted, saying that "if a store tries to order any of our product, the lock has been put on the gate."

Reflecting on the album in 1986, Parsons expressed his belief that the album marked a return to the "three-dimensional kind of quality we'd been missing" and that he intended to replicate this approach for future releases. That same year, he called Stereotomy "our best album in years."

== Critical reception ==
Professional ratings
Review scores
Source	Rating
AllMusic	2/5 stars

Stereotomy generally received negative reviews from music critics. Music Week wrote that with the exception of "Real World" and "Light of the World", the album failed to live up to the potential of the band's previous work, resulting in an album that they found to be "frustratingly commercial, meandering and sadly disappointing." Writing for Sounds, Roger Holland called the album "dreadful" and a "monstrosity" and believed that the album's pre-programmed, computerized technique and self-professed sophistication" came at the expense of "any semblance of human emotion." In his review of the album, J. D. Considine of Musician wrote simply: "Unnecessary surgery."

The Canadian music trade publication RPM said that Stereotomy had "a unique blend of electronic pop and rock vocal styles with fine guitar work from Ian Bairnson." AllMusic felt that the album "came up short" and was only partially salvaged by some of the instrumental compositions, which created "some musical buoyancy among the blandness of the other tracks."

== Track listing ==
All songs written and composed by Alan Parsons and Eric Woolfson.

Side one
No.	Title	Lead vocals	Length
1.	"Stereotomy"	John Miles up to 5:11, Eric Woolfson 5:11 to 5:50	7:18
2.	"Beaujolais"	Chris Rainbow	4:27
3.	"Urbania"	(Instrumental)	4:59
4.	"Limelight"	Gary Brooker	4:39

Side two
No.	Title	Lead vocals	Length
1.	"In the Real World"	Miles	4:20
2.	"Where's the Walrus?"	(Instrumental)	7:31
3.	"Light of the World"	Graham Dye, backing vocal Steven Dye	6:19
4.	"Chinese Whispers"	(Instrumental, spoken word by Sally and Lorna Woolfson)	1:01
5.	"Stereotomy Two"	Miles	1:21

Stereotomy was remastered and reissued in 2008 with the following bonus tracks:

10. "Light of the World" (backing track) – 6:14
11. "Rumour Goin' Round" (demo) – 5:01
12. "Stereotomy" (Eric Woolfson guide vocal) – 6:37
13. "Stereotomy Two" (backing rough mix) – 1:23

== Personnel ==
- Eric Woolfson – DX7 Rhodes, piano, additional vocals on 1, scientist voices on 1
- Alan Parsons – synth sequences on 3, scientist voices on 1, producer
- Ian Bairnson – electric guitars, guitars synth, processed acoustic guitars
- David Paton – bass
- Stuart Elliott – drums and percussion
- Richard Cottle – synths, sequencers, keyboards, sax
- Tony Richards – scientist voices on 1, traffic FX on 3
- Noel Rafferty – scientist voices
- John Miles – vocals on 1, 5, 9
- Chris Rainbow – vocals on 2
- Gary Brooker – vocals on 4
- Grahan Dye – vocals on 7
- Sally and Lora Woolfson – voices on 8
- The Philharmonia Orchestra, leader – Christoffer Warren-Green
- Orchestra arranged and conducted by Andrew Powell

== Charts ==
Chart (1985–1986)	Peak position
Australian Albums (Kent Music Report)	50
Austrian Albums (Ö3 Austria)	15
Canada Top Albums/CDs (RPM)	32
Dutch Albums (Album Top 100)	13
Finnish Albums (The Official Finnish Charts)	16
German Albums (Offizielle Top 100)	15
Italian Albums (Musica e Dischi)	17
New Zealand Albums (RMNZ)	49
Spanish Albums (AFYVE)	5
Swedish Albums (Sverigetopplistan)	21
Swiss Albums (Schweizer Hitparade)	13
US Billboard 200	43
