= Damned If I Do (The Alan Parsons Project song) =

Single by The Alan Parsons Project

from the album Eve
- Released: September 1979
- Recorded: December 1978–June 1979
- Studio: Super Bear Studios, Berre-les-Alpes; Acro Studio, Munich
- Length: 4:50 (album version); 3:31 (single version)
- Label: Arista
- Songwriters: Alan Parsons, Eric Woolfson
- Producer: Alan Parsons

The Alan Parsons Project singles chronology
"Lucifer" (1979)	"Damned If I Do" (1979)	"You Won't Be There" (1980)

"Damned If I Do" is a song by British progressive rock duo The Alan Parsons Project from the 1979 album Eve, where it was included as the sixth track on the album. It was written by Alan Parsons and Eric Woolfson and features Lenny Zakatek on lead vocals. "Damned If I Do" was released as a single in 1979 and reached No. 27 on the US Billboard Hot 100, which at the time was their highest charting song on that listing.

== Background ==
On "Damned If I Do", the horns were recorded on a separate take from the remaining orchestral overdubs, which were completed at Acro Studio in Munich. An alternate mix with more prominent strings and quieter drums and guitar was included on the remastered edition of Eve.

Parsons commented on the song in an interview included on The Complete Audio Guide To The Alan Parsons Project:

If there's such a thing as a typical Project track, I think "I'm Damned If I Do" from the Eve album would have to be one of them. It has the ingredients which we've used in the past, like french horns, the voice of Lenny Zakatek. The one exception: I never thought I'd hear the words "I love you" on a Project song.

— Alan Parsons

== Critical reception ==
Cashbox thought that "Damned If I Do" possessed the band's "usual array of sensual electronically-produced textures" and said that it "should build AOR and pop support" on the radio. Record World felt that the song had a "sharp, infectious rhythm & hook, tailored for AOR-pop". Mike DeGagne of AllMusic referred to "Damned If I Do" as a "bitter and forceful" track.

== Personnel ==
- Eric Woolfson – Wurlitzer
- Duncan Mackay – synthesizers
- Ian Bairnson – guitars
- David Paton – bass guitar
- Stuart Elliott – drums
- Lenny Zakatek – lead vocals
- Andrew Powell – orchestral arrangements and conducting

== Charts ==
Charts (1979–1980)	Peak position
Canada Top Singles (RPM)	16
US Billboard Hot 100	27
