= Freudiana =

1990 studio album by Eric Woolfson and Alan Parsons

Studio album by Eric Woolfson and Alan Parsons
- Released: 11 October 1990
- Recorded: 1989–1990
- Genre: Rock; musical theatre; pop rock
- Length: 74:44
- Label: EMI
- Producer: Alan Parsons

Eric Woolfson albums chronology
Gaudi (1987)	Freudiana (1990)	Freudiana – Deutsche Originalaufnahme (1991)

Alan Parsons albums chronology
Gaudi (1987)	Freudiana (1990)	Try Anything Once (1993)

Professional ratings
Review scores
Source	Rating
AllMusic	4/5 stars

Freudiana /ˌfrɔɪdiˈænə/ is a rock opera by Eric Woolfson. It was to be the 11th album by the Alan Parsons Project, but during its development, Woolfson had creative differences with Alan Parsons, causing the Project's split. With the two still working together on the album, the 1990 production utilizes the Project's personnel as well as guest vocalists, making it the "unofficial" Project album. The Project's official 11th and final album would end up being The Sicilian Defence, later released in 2014 after being shelved for 36 years since its recording in 1979, as part of The Complete Albums box set.

Woolfson hit upon the idea of researching the life and works of Sigmund Freud with a view to their musical potential after he finished Gaudi. He retraced Freud's footsteps and explored his realms through his homes in London and Vienna (both now museums), as well as literary sources including Freud's classic cases, whose real identities he concealed by use of names such as Wolfman, Ratman, Dora, Little Hans, and Schreber, the Judge. In addition, Freud's writings on his discovery of the unconscious, his well-known theories such as the Oedipus Complex, the ego and the id and perhaps his best known work, The Interpretation of Dreams all served as springboards for musical ideas. About halfway through the recording process, Woolfson was approached by Brian Brolly to develop the concept still further into a musical. With Brolly's help, Woolfson turned Freudiana into a stage musical. The musical had a successful run, and it was hoped that the show would open in other cities. Further plans were put on hold when a lawsuit broke out between Brolly and Woolfson, each fighting for control of the project. In the end, Brolly won, but the album remained attributed to Eric Woolfson and Alan Parsons. Freudiana gave Woolfson a taste of musical theatre and he chose to continue in that end of the business.

== Releases ==
This album was released in two versions: the "White Album" and the "Black Album".

The "White Album" was released in 1990 through EMI Records and was the standard album. While it was credited to "Freudiana" and not Eric Woolfson, Alan Parsons nor the Alan Parsons Project, the earliest releases had "The Alan Parsons Project" at the top. It includes 18 tracks with lead vocal performances from Leo Sayer, Kiki Dee, Marti Webb, 10cc's Eric Stewart, Frankie Howerd, Gary Howard and the Flying Pickets, as well as previous Alan Parsons Project vocalists Chris Rainbow, John Miles, Graham Dye, and Woolfson. Alan Parsons made musical contributions throughout the album as well as writing and producing, as he had with Alan Parsons Project albums. Howard would later appear with Parsons' live band on Alan Parsons Live, and Stewart on Parsons' first two solo studio albums, Try Anything Once and On Air.

The Deutsche Originalaufnahme ("German original recording"), also known as the "Black Album", features a double-length cast disc containing material from the rock opera recorded at Theater an der Wien.

== Quotes ==
[It] started as an Alan Parsons Project concept album, and when we were close to completing it, this theatrical producer called Brian Brolly heard it and wanted to develop it into a stage musical, so we had to literally double the length of it and put new music in, do reprises, and, y’know, write songs for different characters and so on. So it developed from a single album to a double album, and then the feeling was at the time that it was not suitable to be called The Alan Parsons Project, so it became Freudiana, produced by Alan Parsons and with all the same people as The Alan Parsons Project. But it turned out that that was a huge marketing mistake, because nobody knew it was there. Had it come out as The Alan Parsons Project, it probably would’ve done a whole lot better [...]

— Alan Parsons, Alan Parsons interview, All Our Yesterdays, Art and Science of Sound Recording

We often disagreed and the tragic thing about "Freudiana" was that it all turned into a legal battle between Eric and the producer. A sad time for all of us because we were in and out of court for more than three years, paying a lot of money. It's bad because the show really had the potential of "Cats" or "Les Misérables" and then went down in completely nonsensical litigation.

So what was your relationship with Eric Woolfson like after the musical?

Parsons: Unfortunately, that was also our last project together. After all the disputes, he really wanted to go back to the theater, and I personally didn't really see the point of expressing my creativity there.

— Alan Parsons, Alan Parsons Live Project im Wiener Gasometer zu Gast

It started out that it was going to be an Alan Parsons Project album, but I wanted to develop into musical theater, so we didn’t call it an Alan Parsons Project album. Eventually we started to undo the ties between us. Instead of crediting the songs to both him and I, the songs were my songs, other than one track in which he did compose, and we didn’t give it a joint name.

— Eric Woolfson, The Alan Parsons Project: If you believe in the power of magic…

== Track listing (the "White Album") ==
All tracks are written by Eric Woolfson, except "Beyond the Pleasure Principle" by Alan Parsons.

No.	Title	Vocals	Length
1.	"The Nirvana Principle"	Instrumental	3:44
2.	"Freudiana"	Woolfson	6:20
3.	"I Am a Mirror"	Leo Sayer	4:06
4.	"Little Hans"	Graham Dye (lead), Chris Rainbow (backing)	3:15
5.	"Dora"	Woolfson	3:51
6.	"Funny You Should Say That"	The Flying Pickets	4:36
7.	"You're on Your Own"	Kiki Dee	3:54
8.	"Far Away from Home"	The Flying Pickets	3:11
9.	"Let Yourself Go"	Woolfson	5:26
10.	"Beyond the Pleasure Principle"	Instrumental	3:13
11.	"The Ring"	Eric Stewart	4:22
12.	"Sects Therapy"	Frankie Howerd	3:40
13.	"No One Can Love You Better Than Me"	Dee, Woolfson, Marti Webb, Gary Howard	5:40
14.	"Don't Let the Moment Pass"	Webb	3:40
15.	"Upper Me"	Stewart	5:16
16.	"Freudiana"	Instrumental	3:43
17.	"Destiny"	Rainbow	0:51
18.	"There But for the Grace of God"	Webb, John Miles	5:56
Total length:			74:44

== Personnel ==
- Eric Woolfson – Keyboards, vocals, executive producer
- Alan Parsons – Additional keyboards, engineer, producer
- Andrew Powell – Arrangements, orchestra leader
- Ian Bairnson – Guitar
- Laurie Cottle – Bass
- Richard Cottle – Synthesizer, saxophone
- Stuart Elliott – Drums, percussion

== Charts ==
Chart (1990–1991)	Peak position
Austrian Albums (Ö3 Austria)	7
Dutch Albums (Album Top 100)	51
German Albums (Offizielle Top 100)	50

== Stage musical version ==
Freudiana – Deutsche Originalaufnahme

Cast recording by Eric Woolfson
- Released: 1991
- Genre: Rock
- Length: 67:47
- Label: EMI
- Producer: Herwig Ursin

Eric Woolfson chronology
Freudiana – Deutsche Originalaufnahme (1991)	Gaudi (1995)

Freudiana premiered at the Theater an der Wien in Vienna, Austria on 19 December 1990. It was produced by Vereinigte Bühnen Wien. Until 18 April 1992, it played for 380 performances before 320,000 people.

The stage director was Peter Weck. The German song texts were by Lida Winiewicz. Erik was played by Ulrich Tukur.

=== Track listing, Deutsche Originalaufnahme (the "Black Album") ===
1. "Freudiana" (Instrumental) – 3:07
2. "Kleiner Hans" – 3:08 Original: Little Hans
3. "Ich bin dein Spiegel" – 4:00 Original: I Am A Mirror
4. "Es ist durchaus nicht erwiesen" – 4:42 Original: Funny You Should Say That
5. "Dora" – 3:55
6. "Du bist allein" – 4:24 Original: You're on Your Own
7. "Ausgestossen" – 3:58 Original: Far Away From Home
8. "Doctor Charcot" – 4:54 Original: Let Yourself Go
9. "Frau Schmetterling" – 4:11 Original: Sects Therapy
10. "Der Ring" – 3:06 Original: The Ring
11. "Vision Dora" (Instrumental) – 3:00 Original: Beyond The Pleasure Principle
12. "Nie war das Glück so nah" – 3:20 Original: Don't Let The Moment Pass
13. "U-Bahn" – 3:45 Original: Upper Me
14. "Wer ging den Weg" – 5:04 Original: There But for the Grace of God – Note: Title in lyric booklet given as "Wer kennt den Weg"
15. "Oedipus – Terzett" – 6:25 Original: The Nirvana Principle (intro only) / No One Can Love You Better Than Me
16. "Chorus" – 0:58 Original: Destiny
17. "Freudiana" – 4:58

The CD contains most of the musical content of the show; aside from the spoken passages and some incidental music, there's also a reprise of "Es ist durchaus nicht erwiesen" following "Der Ring" which was cut from the cast recording.

=== Personnel ===
- Herwig Ursin – production manager, post-processing and mixing
- Fritz Staudinger, Gernot Ursin, Peter Naumann – recording engineers
- Recorded with the HEY-U-Studiomobil at the Theater an der Wien
