= Games People Play (The Alan Parsons Project song) =

Single by The Alan Parsons Project

from the album The Turn of a Friendly Card
- B-side: "The Ace of Swords"
- Released: November 1980
- Length: 4:23 (album); 3:17 (7-inch single)
- Label: Arista
- Songwriters: Alan Parsons, Eric Woolfson
- Producers: Alan Parsons, Eric Woolfson

The Alan Parsons Project singles chronology
"The Turn of a Friendly Card" (1980)	"Games People Play" (1980)	"Time" (1981)

Music video
- "Games People Play" on YouTube

"Games People Play" is a 1980 song by the Alan Parsons Project. It peaked at No. 16 on 14 March 1981 on the Billboard Hot 100 chart as well as No. 18 on Cash Box. It appears on the album The Turn of a Friendly Card and was sung by Lenny Zakatek.

== Single version ==
The single version of the song features two edits, one during the instrumental section preceding the guitar solo, and another shortening the guitar solo. It is also sped up slightly. The "single edit" included on the deluxe anniversary edition of The Turn of a Friendly Card from 2015 is edited differently and presented at the original pitch, so it is not the actual single version.

== Critical reception ==
Record World wrote that the song's "irresistible keyboard melodies play with the rhythm [sic] drive." Billboard called "Games People Play" an "uptempo track", adding that the "hook is incredibly infectious and [the] twin guitar work midway through adds extra bite."

== Personnel ==
- Ian Bairnson – guitars
- David Paton – bass guitar
- Eric Woolfson – keyboards
- Alan Parsons – Projectron
- Stuart Elliott – drums, percussion
- Lenny Zakatek – lead and backing vocals
- Chris Rainbow – backing vocals

== Charts ==
=== Weekly charts ===
Chart (1980–1981)	Peak position
Australia (Kent Music Report)	95
Canada Top 100 (RPM)	9
US Billboard Hot 100	16

=== Year-end charts ===
Year-end chart (1981)	Rank
US Top Pop Singles (Billboard)	66
Canada (RPM)	90

== Release history ==
Country	Date
United States	November 1980
United Kingdom	January 1981
