= Don't Answer Me =

Single by The Alan Parsons Project

from the album Ammonia Avenue
- B-side: "Don't Let It Show" "You Don't Believe" (Europe)
- Released: 13 February 1984
- Recorded: 1983
- Genre: Pop rock; jangle pop; new wave
- Length: 4:09
- Label: Arista
- Songwriters: Alan Parsons, Eric Woolfson
- Producer: Alan Parsons

The Alan Parsons Project singles chronology
"You Don't Believe" (1983)	"Don't Answer Me" (1984)	"Prime Time" (1984)

Music video
- "Don't Answer Me" on YouTube

"Don't Answer Me" is a 1984 song by the Alan Parsons Project from the album Ammonia Avenue. It reached number 15 on the Billboard charts in the United States and was the final Billboard Top 20 hit for the group. It also reached number 58 in the United Kingdom, the group's highest chart placing in their native country. The music video was rendered in comic book style, with art and animation by Michael Kaluta.

== Background ==
Instead of the art rock and progressive rock sounds for which Alan Parsons was well-known, Parsons crafted "Don't Answer Me" in the style of Phil Spector and his Wall of Sound technique. Eric Woolfson, the co-writer, handled lead vocals on the single, with Mel Collins providing a saxophone solo with a "soothing yet destitute wail".

In the United Kingdom, "Don't Answer Me" was released by Arista Records on 13 February 1984 in a picture sleeve in a 7" and 12" format. Both variants of the single included the track "You Don't Believe", with the 12" single also including "Games People Play" and "Old and Wise".

== Critical reception ==
Reviewing the single for Music Week, Tony Jasper described the verses as having a "big Floydish sound" and "more drama on the refrain with everything carried along briskly." AllMusic characterised the song's saxophone as "soothing yet destitute" and called the song one of the band's most enchanting singles.

== Music video ==
The music video for "Don't Answer Me" was directed and animated by Michael Kaluta with the assistance of Kelly Alder and David Powers. Production was handled by the Storytellers division of Doyle Dane Bernbach under the supervision of Bill Perna. D.J. Webster and Charlie Rice were given 24 hours to develop the storyboard for the music video, another 24 hours to determine the budget, and another 24 hours to find an entity willing to carry out the project; they ultimately selected Broadcast Arts, an animation company that had also created the logos for MTV.

The music video was filmed over the course of three weeks. Peter Baron, who was the erstwhile manager of video services for Arista Records, commented that a shorter timeframe was provided as the release of the single was "imminent". Visually, the music video used traditional cel animation imposed over three-dimensional sets, with members of the Alan Parsons Project appearing throughout certain portions. Speech balloons appear above the animated characters with dialogue that differs from the song's lyrics. The 40-man animation team created 12 drawings for every second of the music video, with each image being mounted on styrofoam for the filming.

The video is presented as a story in a fictional comic book series, The Adventures of Nick and Sugar. The story starts at the Flamingo Bar, where Sugar is on a date with the thuggish "Muscles" Malone. Sugar was once in a romantic relationship with Nick, who consumes a bottle of Johnnie Walker Red as he watches Malone manhandle Sugar. After finishing the bottle, Nick leaves the bar and drives to the Burgers'N'Shakes drive-in, passing a billboard with the Ammonia Avenue album cover displayed. While admitting his heartbreak to Leslie, the carhop, a black sedan carrying Malone and Sugar pulls up next to Nick's convertible. When Sugar resists Malone's demand for a kiss, Malone moves to slap Sugar. An enraged Nick pulls Malone from his car and starts brawling with the much-larger thug. Malone appears to have beaten Nick, but Nick summons one last powerful uppercut and knocks Malone clear off the planet, sending him into the left eye of the Man in the Moon. As Nick and Sugar embrace, the view quickly cuts to a still picture drawing of the band featuring Woolfson and Parsons at keyboards, dressed in midcentury cocktail lounge outfits, performing the song. Nick and Sugar drive away together, with Nick pausing to wipe Malone out of the Man in the Moon's eye with his handkerchief.

The video was nominated for Most Experimental Video at the first-ever 1984 MTV Video Music Awards, but lost to Herbie Hancock's "Rockit".

== Live recordings ==
Parsons and his "Alan Parsons Live Project" band perform the song in concert, with live versions released on the albums Alan Parsons Live with Gary Howard and Chris Thompson on vocals, Eye 2 Eye: Live In Madrid, LiveSpan, Alan Parsons Symphonic Project, Live in Colombia, The NeverEnding Show: Live in the Netherlands and One Note Symphony: Live in Tel Aviv, the latter with Parsons on lead vocals.

== Personnel ==
- Ian Bairnson – acoustic and electric guitars, acoustic baritone guitar
- Mel Collins – saxophone
- Stuart Elliott – drums, percussion
- Alan Parsons – Fairlight CMI
- David Paton – bass guitar, acoustic guitar
- Chris Rainbow – backing vocals, keyboards
- Eric Woolfson – keyboards, lead vocals
- Andrew Powell – orchestral arrangements and conducting
- Christopher Warren-Green – The Philharmonia Orchestra leader

== Chart performance ==
=== Weekly charts ===
Chart (1984–1985)	Peak position
Australia (Kent Music Report)	43
Belgium (Ultratop 50 Flanders)	8
Belgium (VRT Top 30 Flanders)	9
Canada Adult Contemporary (RPM)	1
Canada Top Singles (RPM)	22
Canada (CHUM)	13
European Hot 100 Singles (Music & Media)	8
European Airplay (Music & Media)	3
France (IFOP)	4
Germany (GfK)	7
Netherlands (Single Top 100)	10
Netherlands (Dutch Top 40)	7
New Zealand (Recorded Music NZ)	30
Spain (AFYVE)	7
Switzerland (Schweizer Hitparade)	8
UK Singles (Official Charts)	58
US Billboard Hot 100	15
US Adult Contemporary (Billboard)	4
US Mainstream Rock (Billboard)	15
US Cash Box	17

=== Year-end charts ===
Chart (1984)	Position
Belgium (Ultratop 50 Flanders)	69
Germany (Official German Charts)	62
Netherlands (Single Top 100)	79
Netherlands (Dutch Top 40)	56
US Adult Contemporary (Billboard)	36
