= The Turn of a Friendly Card =

1980 studio album by the Alan Parsons Project

Studio album by The Alan Parsons Project
- Released: 7 November 1980
- Recorded: 1979–1980
- Studios: Acousti Studio, Paris, France
- Genres: Art rock, progressive rock, soft rock
- Length: 40:25
- Label: Arista
- Producer: Alan Parsons

The Alan Parsons Project chronology
Eve (1979)	The Turn of a Friendly Card (1980)	Eye in the Sky (1982)

Singles from The Turn of a Friendly Card
- 1. "The Turn of a Friendly Card" Released: October 1980 (UK); 2. "Games People Play" Released: November 1980 (US); 3. "The Gold Bug" Released: November 1980 (EU); 4. "Time" Released: April 1981; 5. "Snake Eyes" Released: October 1981

The Turn of a Friendly Card is the fifth studio album by the British progressive rock duo the Alan Parsons Project, released in 1980 by Arista Records. The album was recorded in a record short time of six weeks in Paris. Usually the Alan Parsons Project would take many months to record an album. The title piece, which appears on side 2 of the LP, is a 16-minute suite broken up into five tracks.

The Turn of a Friendly Card is a concept album with its theme focused on the gambling industry and the fate of gamblers. According to Woolfson, the band made an effort to create an album that would be commercially accessible "in all the world markets." The Turn of a Friendly Card spawned the hits "Games People Play" and "Time", the latter of which was Eric Woolfson's first lead vocal appearance. An edited version of the title piece combining the opening and ending parts of the suite was also released as a single along with an official video.

== Release ==
Up to this album, all Alan Parsons Project albums had been packaged in gatefold sleeves. Due to increasing budgetary constraints endured by record companies, The Turn of a Friendly Card was the first Alan Parsons Project album to be issued in single-sleeve packaging

For the promotional efforts surrounding Turn of a Friendly Card, Woolfson reached a deal with their record company that the band would finance television advertisements themselves and recoup these costs from the company through album sales. Record Business announced that television advertisements would be broadcast on London Weekend Television during early November 1980, which would be augmented by additional advertising through music trade magazines and a radio campaign on the Capital radio network via Our Price Records.

Two Japanese cassette players with stereo headphones were set up at the HMV Oxford Street Store for one week to provide members of the public a chance to preview the album. Woolfson mentioned that the response from this promotional effort was "excellent" and that "only one machine was stolen."

In the United States, the album's merchandising consisted of 24"x36" posters and 1x1 minicovers. The band also held a press conference at the Sheraton Hotel in Buenos Aires, Argentina, having been shifted to that venue from Ion Studios due to anticipated high attendance at the event. An album playback and a "questions and answers games" followed the press conference, along with what Cashbox described as a "lavish cold dinner". Other album previews were held in Germany and Switzerland.

== Critical reception ==
Professional ratings
Review scores
Source	Rating
AllMusic	4.5/5 stars

Billboard thought that the album's vocals were "capably handled" and labelled "May Be a Price to Pay", "Games People Play", and "Turn of a Friendly Card" as its best tracks. Cashbox also highlighted the title track in its review, calling it "stunning". They also said that the "multitude of strong vocalists, some nice classical passages and Parson's brilliantly thick production put this LP a cut above the rest of the progressive rock releases." Record World said that Turn of a Friendly Card was bolstered by "the effectiveness of Parsons' writing and production", adding that he "illustrates the album's theme with a variety of moods, methods and lead vocalists."

== Track listing ==
All songs written and composed by Alan Parsons and Eric Woolfson.

Side one
No.	Title	Lead vocals	Length
1.	"May Be a Price to Pay"	Elmer Gantry	4:58
2.	"Games People Play"	Lenny Zakatek	4:22
3.	"Time"	Eric Woolfson	5:04
4.	"I Don't Wanna Go Home"	Zakatek	5:03

Side two
No.	Title	Lead vocals	Length
1.	"The Gold Bug"	Instrumental	4:34
2.	"The Turn of a Friendly Card: i. The Turn of a Friendly Card Pt. 1 (2:44); ii. Snake Eyes (3:14); iii. The Ace of Swords (2:57); iv. Nothing Left to Lose (4:07); v. The Turn of a Friendly Card Pt. 2 (3:22)"	Chris Rainbow (i, ii, v), Eric Woolfson (iv), none (iii)	16:24

Though numbered as a single work, "The Turn of a Friendly Card" is split into five tracks on most compact disc and all digital and streaming releases. On early CD releases it was a single track with five index points.

=== Bonus tracks (2008 remaster) ===
The Turn of a Friendly Card was remastered and reissued in 2008 with the following bonus tracks:

11. "May Be a Price to Pay" (Intro/demo) 1:32
12. "Nothing Left to Lose" (Basic backing track) 4:36
13. "Nothing Left to Lose" (Chris Rainbow overdub compilation) 2:02
14. "Nothing Left to Lose" (Early studio version with Woolfson's guide vocal) 3:11
15. "Time" (Early studio attempt) 4:42
16. "Games People Play" (Rough mix) 4:33
17. "The Gold Bug" (Demo) 2:50
- On the "Early studio version" of "Nothing Left to Lose", Woolfson plays the accordion solo (later played on an actual accordion) on a keyboard with a cheap-sounding accordion preset. His melody is vaguely similar to Alan Civil's horn solo in The Beatles's "For No One".

"The Gold Bug" (Demo) was named after an Edgar Allan Poe short story. The main keyboard sound is a Hohner Clavinet with damaged strings and a repeat echo. This was also used for the final album version. The short duration of the notes made it difficult to get in tune.

=== Deluxe Edition (2015) ===
In 2015, a "deluxe anniversary edition" was released on double CD. This featured a new remaster of the album, the bonus tracks of the 2008 edition on disc 1 and an additional disc including excerpts from Eric Woolfson's songwriting demos, rough mixes and the three single edits. On this new remaster, Parsons corrected a persisting speed mistake which was present in all earlier CD editions, from the very first (1987) up to the 2008 remaster, caused by the original master tape running slow during the CD mastering process and thus altering the pitch of the entire recording.

"Eric's Songwriting Demos"

1. "May Be a Price to Pay" 3:26
2. "Games People Play" 3:06
3. "Time" 4:06
4. "I Don't Wanna Go Home" 2:12
5. "The Turn of a Friendly Card" 3:19
6. "Snake Eyes" 3:13
7. "Nothing Left to Lose" 2:46
8. "TOFC / Snake Eyes / I Don't Wanna Go Home" 4:32

"Extra Bonus Tracks"

9. "May Be a Price to Pay (Early version – Eric Guide Vocal & Unused Guitar Solo)" 5:03
10. "Games People Play (Early Version – Eric Guide vocal)" 4:32
11. "Time (Orchestra & Chris Rainbow Backing vocals)" 4:19
12. "The Gold Bug (Early Reference Version)" 5:08
13. "The Turn of a Friendly Card Part One (Early Backing Track)" 2:18
14. "Snake Eyes (Early Version – Eric Guide Vocal)" 3:20
15. "The Ace of Swords (Early Version With Synth "Orchestration")" 3:03
16. "The Ace of Swords (Early Version With Piano on Melody)" 2:40
17. "The Turn of a Friendly Card Part Two (Eric Guide Vocal And Extended Guitar Solo)" 3:32

"Single Edits"

18. "Games People Play" 3:35
19. "The Turn of a Friendly Card" 3:44
20. "Snake Eyes" 2:26

=== Box Set (2023) ===
In 2023, a four-disc box set was released featuring the material from the 2-CD plus five additional songwriting diaries of unused songs ("La La La Lah", "Next Year", "Someone Else", "Taking It All Away" and "To Those Of You Out There"), two more studio bonus tracks ("The Gold Bug - Chris Rainbow Backing Vocals" and "The Gold Bug - Clavinet With No Delay") and a Blu-Ray disc including a new 5.1 surround mix of the album plus four promo videos. The Blu-Ray was also made available separately.

== Personnel ==
- Stuart Elliott – drums, percussion
- David Paton – bass guitar, acoustic guitar
- Ian Bairnson – electric, acoustic and classical guitars
- Eric Woolfson – keyboards, piano, harpsichord, organ, lead vocals
- Alan Parsons – Projectron on "Games People Play", whistling and finger snaps on "The Gold Bug", clavinet on "The Gold Bug" and "The Ace of Swords", autoharp on "The Gold Bug", harpsichord on "The Ace of Swords", additional vocals on "Time"
- Chris Rainbow – lead and backing vocals
- Dennis Clarke – saxophone
- Elmer Gantry (Dave Terry) – lead vocal
- Lenny Zakatek – lead and backing vocals
- The Philharmonia Orchestra, arranged and conducted by Andrew Powell

Produced and engineered by Alan Parsons
Executive producer: Eric Woolfson
Mastering consultant: Chris Blair
Sleeve concept: Lol Creme and Kevin Godley

- Ted Jensen Original LP UK & US Pressings.

Additional instrumentation

"The Gold Bug", which references the same-titled short story by Edgar Allan Poe, includes a whistling part by Parsons (in the style of Ennio Morricone's early themes for Sergio Leone's Spaghetti Western films, such as A Fistful of Dollars) and wordless vocals by Rainbow, while the main theme is played on an alto saxophone. The saxophone player, originally credited as Mel Collins, is instead credited on the liner notes for the remastered edition as "A session player in Paris whose name escapes us". Similarly, the accordion part on "Nothing Left to Lose" is credited in the liner notes to "An unidentified Parisian session player". Newer editions of the liner notes, starting with the 2008 remastered edition, credit a "Harmonized Rotating Triangle" to Stuart Elliott.

== Charts ==
=== Weekly charts ===
Chart (1980–1981)	Peak position
Australia Albums (Kent Music Report)	24
Austrian Albums (Ö3 Austria)	2
Canada Top Albums/CDs (RPM)	16
Dutch Albums (Album Top 100)	17
German Albums (Offizielle Top 100)	2
New Zealand Albums (RMNZ)	18
Norwegian Albums (VG-lista)	11
Spanish Albums (AFE)	15
Swedish Albums (Sverigetopplistan)	22
UK Albums (Official Charts)	38
US Billboard 200	13

Chart (2023)	Peak position
UK Independent Albums (Official Charts)	20
UK Rock & Metal Albums (Official Charts)	15

Chart (2026)	Peak position
French Physical Albums (SNEP)	150
German Rock & Metal Albums (Offizielle Top 100)	19

=== Year-end charts ===
Chart (1981)	Position
Austrian Albums (Ö3 Austria)	5
Canada Top Albums/CDs (RPM)	54
German Albums (Offizielle Top 100)	8
US Billboard 200	11

== Certifications and sales ==
Region	Certification	Certified units/sales
Canada (Music Canada)	2× Platinum	200,000^{^}
Germany (BVMI)	Gold	250,000^{^}
Netherlands (NVPI)	Gold	50,000^{^}
New Zealand (RMNZ)	Gold	7,500^{^}
United States (RIAA)	Platinum	1,000,000^{^}
Summaries
Worldwide	—	2,000,000
^{^} Shipments figures based on certification alone.
