= Stereotomy (song) =

Single by The Alan Parsons Project

from the album Stereotomy
- B-side: "Urbania"
- Released: 10 February 1986
- Recorded: 1985
- Studio: Mayfair Studios, London, England
- Length: 7:18
- Label: Arista
- Songwriters: Eric Woolfson, Alan Parsons
- Producer: Alan Parsons

The Alan Parsons Project singles chronology
"Days Are Numbers (The Traveller)" (1985)	"Stereotomy" (1986)	"Limelight" (1986)

"Stereotomy" is a song by The Alan Parsons Project, the opening track to their 1985 album Stereotomy. John Miles sang lead vocals on the song and additional vocals were provided by Eric Woolfson, who co-wrote the song with Alan Parsons. It was released as the album's first single and became the band's final song to reach the US Billboard Hot 100 chart, where it peaked at No. 82. A music video was created to coincide with the release of the single.

== Background ==
Woolfson said that he found the word stereotomy in an Edgar Allan Poe short story titled Murders in the Rue Morgue. Woolfson recounted the discovery of the word to Dave Zimmer of BAM magazine in 1986.

When I saw this word...'stereotomy'...I thought, 'Wow! Poe's come up with a rock and roll word!' To me, it sounded like it should describe a magnificent collection of sounds. The real meaning, I've been told, has something to do with the shaping of solids.

— Eric Woolfson

The guide vocal on "Stereotomy" was sung by Woolfson, after which John Miles replaced it with a different take that was used on the final mix. In 2008, the early mix with Woolfson's vocals was included on the remastered edition of Stereotomy. The brass sounds were recorded by the Philharmonia Orchestra as an overdub; the ensemble featured bass trombones and tubas among other instruments.

== Release ==
"Stereotomy" was initially serviced to album oriented rock radio rock stations. According to Radio & Records, it was the most added song in that format for the week of 3 January 1986. During the week of 10 January 1986, it debuted at No. 17 on the Top AOR Tracks listing for Radio & Records, having received 81 new adds to stations in that format. In doing so, 114 album oriented rock stations had included the song in their playlists, comprising 73 percent of all album oriented rock stations reporting to Radio & Records. It debuted at No. 31 on the US Billboard Top Rock Tracks chart and ascended to No. 11 on that listing by the end of January. That same month, it was listed by the editorial staff of Europtipsheet as a suggested song for airplay on European radio stations.

"Stereotomy" released as a physical single by Arista Records on 10 February 1986 with "Urbania" as the B-side. By this point, the song had already crossed over to contemporary hit radio. By the time "Stereotomy" was released as an official single, it had reached the top five on the Billboard Top Rock Tracks chart and also debuted at No. 88 on the Billboard Hot 100. It later peaked at No. 82 on the Billboard Hot 100 and spent a total of five weeks on the listing. The single also received airplay in Spain, where it was the eighth most played song during the week of 5 April 1986 from Cuarenta Principale, covering the main Spanish radio stations.

When asked by Keyboard magazine if there were any other songs on Stereotomy other than the title track that would have worked as singles, Woolfson expressed his opinion that "there were better choices." He also called it "a very good track for AOR radio" and felt that it did not resonate with people who primarily purchase top 40 singles.

== Music video ==
The song's music video was launched on MTV for the week of 14 February 1986 where it was placed on power rotation. It was directed by Zbigniew Rybczyński and produced by Kris P through Zbig Vision Ltd. John Servideo of Betelgeuse Productions at Panavideo was responsible for the video's special effects. The music video showcases a gymnast performing choreographed tricks.

== Critical reception ==
Billboard referred to the track as a "Floydish stomper." Margaret Warner of the Bangor Daily News highlighted the vocals of John Miles on the track and interpreted some of the lyrics as pertaining to the handling of fame and the practice of cutting solids into shapes, the latter of which relates to the definition of stereotomy. Writing for AllMusic, Mike DeGagne thought that Miles' "angriness" and "forceful voice" made the song a "passable rock tune."

== Personnel ==
- Ian Bairnson – guitars and guitar synth
- David Paton – bass guitar
- Eric Woolfson – Yamaha DX7, additional vocals, scientist voices
- Richard Cottle – synthesisers and sequencers
- Stuart Elliott – drums, percussion
- John Miles – lead vocals
- Alan Parsons – scientist voices
- Tony Richards – scientist voices
- Noel Rafferty – scientist voices
- Andrew Powell – orchestral arrangements and conducting
- Philharmonia Orchestra – brass

== Chart performance ==
Chart (1986)	Peak position
Spain (AFYVE)	16
US Billboard Hot 100	82
US Mainstream Rock (Billboard)	5
US Cashbox Top 100	71
