= Pyramid (The Alan Parsons Project album) =

1978 studio album

Studio album by The Alan Parsons Project
- Released: 26 May 1978
- Recorded: September 1977 – February 1978
- Studios: Abbey Road Studios, London, England
- Genres: Progressive rock; art rock; symphonic rock; soft rock
- Length: 37:46
- Label: Arista
- Producer: Alan Parsons

The Alan Parsons Project chronology
I Robot (1977)	Pyramid (1978)	Eve (1979)

Singles from Pyramid
- 1. "Pyramania" Released: June 1978; 2. "What Goes Up" Released: September 1978; 3. "Hyper-Gamma-Spaces" Released: January 1979 (EU)

Professional ratings
Review scores
Source	Rating
AllMusic	3/5 stars
Mojo	4/5 stars

Pyramid (stylized as Pyr△mid) is the third album by progressive rock duo The Alan Parsons Project, released in May 1978. It is a concept album centred on the pyramids of Giza. At the time the album was conceived, interest in pyramid power and Tutankhamun was widespread in the US and the UK. Pyramid was nominated for the 1978 Grammy Award for Best Engineered Album, Non-Classical.

The book visible in the cover design is G. Patrick Flanagan – Pyramid Power: The Millennium Science (1973).

Pyramid was promoted in the United Kingdom through a nationwide cinema tour where the original master tapes were played in cinemas around the country. These playbacks, described as "simulated concerts" by Music Week, took place in 30 cities across the United Kingdom. Free tickets to these album playbacks were distributed via dealers and took place at local cinemas. Posters, shop displays, trade ads, and special media bios were created to provide the album with additional publicity and press advertisement was conducted in publications such as The Guardian and The Sunday Times.

== Critical reception ==
Cashbox wrote that the band "finally delivered an album which goes beyond cracker -jack production techniques and delves whole-heartedly into the realm of 'identifiable sound'". Billboard said that the album "aurally interesting", with an emphasis on choirs and keyboards for a "spacey sound." Record World called Pyramid "another immaculately produced album" from The Alan Parsons Project, saying that the creative contributions of musicians and vocalists on the record resulted in a "sometimes lush but haunting accompaniment".

Tony Jasper of Music Week thought that the album was instrumentally varied and that the music was more likely to catch the attention of listeners than the lyrical themes, which he described as "sometimes banal". Discussing the album in Polyphony magazine, Marvin Jones expressed his belief that Pyramid was an "excellent recapitulation of his magical 'hit record' formula which has appeared on his last two "solo" albums", citing the "persistent useless drum beats, droning chords, vocal choirs, and a touch of "movie music" orchestration have become synonymous with Parsons." He felt that Parsons was overreliant on audio effects and the use of orchestral elements, but was complimentary of Colin Blunstone's vocals and some of the extra instrumental ornamentation, including the autoharp on "The Eagle Will Rise Again" and the synthesized tuba solo on "Pyramania".

== Track listing ==
All songs written and composed by Alan Parsons and Eric Woolfson.

Side one
No.	Title	Vocals	Length
1.	"Voyager"	Instrumental	2:14
2.	"What Goes Up"	David Paton, additional vocals by Dean Ford	3:31
3.	"The Eagle Will Rise Again"	Colin Blunstone	4:20
4.	"One More River"	Lenny Zakatek	4:15
5.	"Can't Take It with You"	Dean Ford	5:06

Side two
No.	Title	Vocals	Length
1.	"In the Lap of the Gods"	Instrumental	5:27
2.	"Pyramania"	Jack Harris	2:45
3.	"Hyper-Gamma-Spaces"	Instrumental	4:19
4.	"Shadow of a Lonely Man"	John Miles; additional vocals by Colin Blunstone	5:34

=== Bonus tracks ===
Pyramid was remastered and reissued in 2008 with the following bonus tracks:

10. "Voyager/What Goes Up/The Eagle Will Rise Again" (instrumental) – 8:55
11. "What Goes Up/Little Voice" (early version demo) – 4:07
12. "Can't Take It with You" (early version demo) – 1:45
13. "Hyper-Gamma-Spaces" (demo) – 2:21
14. "The Eagle Will Rise Again" (alternate version – backing track) – 3:20
15. "In the Lap of the Gods" (Part I – demo) – 3:14
16. "In the Lap of the Gods" (Part II – backing track rough mix) – 1:56

== Bonus tracks details ==
- What Goes Up/Little Voice – Another song called, at the time, Little Voice was included in this demo but was not used in the final album.
- Can't Take It With You (early version demo) – Alan Parsons (unusually) played all the instruments.
- Hyper-Gamma Spaces – The name came from Eric Woolfson's brother Richard, whose Mathematics Doctoral Thesis carried the title Hyper-Gamma Spaces.
- The Eagle Will Rise Again (alternative version-backing track) – Intended as a Reprise Rock Band version demo attempt. This was abandoned as there was already enough material for the album.

== Personnel ==
- David Paton – bass (all tracks), acoustic guitar (tracks 2, 4–6, 9) vocals (tracks 2–3, 5)
- Stuart Elliott – drums (all tracks), percussion (tracks 1–2, 4–9)
- Ian Bairnson – electric and acoustic guitars (tracks 1–7, 9)
- Eric Woolfson – Projectron (track 1), Fender Rhodes (track 2), clavichord and virginals (track 3), piano (tracks 5–7, 9), organ (track 6), backing vocals (3, 5)
- Duncan Mackay – synthesizers (track 1, 4–5, 7–8)
- Alan Parsons – Fender Rhodes (track 1), acoustic guitar (track 5), Wurlitzer (track 8), Projectron (tracks 8–9), backing vocals (track 3)
- John Leach – kantele (track 1), cimbalom (track 6)
- Andrew Powell – autoharp (track 3)
- Phil Kenzie – saxophone solos (track 4)
- Dean Ford, Colin Blunstone, Lenny Zakatek, John Miles, Jack Harris – vocals
- Choir: The English Chorale, Choirmaster: Bob Howes
- Produced and engineered by Alan Parsons
- Executive production: Eric Woolfson
- Arrangements: Andrew Powell
- Album cover design: Hipgnosis
- Photography Aubrey Powell / Rob Brimson
- Mastering: Chris Blair

== Charts ==
=== Weekly charts ===
Chart (1978–1979)	Peak position
Australian Albums (Kent Music Report)	16
Austrian Albums (Ö3 Austria)	17
Canada Top Albums/CDs (RPM)	34
Dutch Albums (Album Top 100)	23
German Albums (Offizielle Top 100)	3
New Zealand Albums (RMNZ)	4
Norwegian Albums (VG-lista)	13
Spanish Albums (AFE)	4
Swedish Albums (Sverigetopplistan)	22
UK Albums (Official Charts)	49
US Billboard 200	26

=== Year-end charts ===
Chart (1978)	Position
German Albums (Offizielle Top 100)	8
New Zealand Albums (RMNZ)	18

Chart (1979)	Position
German Albums (Offizielle Top 100)	2

== Certifications and sales ==
Region	Certification	Certified units/sales
Australia (ARIA)	Gold	20,000^{^}
Canada (Music Canada)	2× Platinum	200,000^{^}
Germany (BVMI)	Platinum	500,000^{^}
New Zealand (RMNZ)	Gold	7,500^{^}
Spain (Promusicae)	Gold	50,000^{^}
United States (RIAA)	Gold	500,000^{^}
Summaries
Worldwide	—N/a	2,000,000+
^{^} Shipments figures based on certification alone.
