= Lenny Zakatek =

British singer

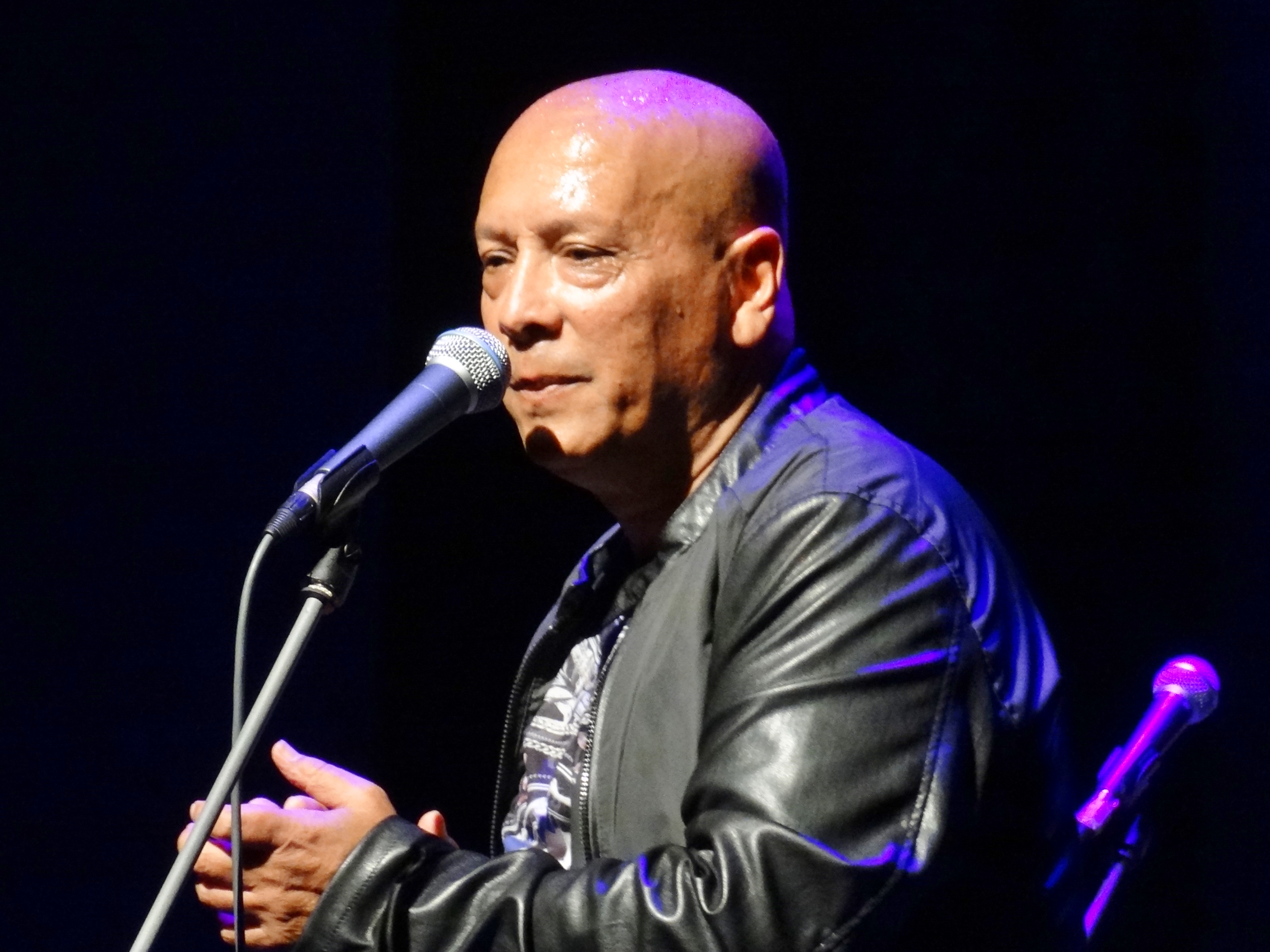
- Zakatek in the Teatre Municipal d'Artà in 2014

Background information
- Also known as: "The Voice" on The Alan Parsons Project
- Born: Lenny du Platel; 29 July 1947 (age 79); Karachi, British India
- Origin: London, England
- Genres: Funk; rock; blues; R&B; disco; soul; pop
- Years active: 1964–present
- Labels: EMI; A&M
- Member of: The Alan Parsons Project; Gonzalez; Funky Fever; The Trailblazers
- Website: www.lennyzakatek.co.uk

Lenny Zakatek (born Lenny du Platel, 29 July 1947) is a British singer and musician. Born in Karachi, British India, just prior to it becoming a part of Pakistan, he has lived in London since the age of thirteen. Zakatek is best known for his work with the British bands Gonzalez and The Alan Parsons Project.

== Early years ==
In 1964, Zakatek formed a rock band called The Trailblazers, as lead singer and rhythm guitarist. On their first tour of US military bases in Europe, they became familiar with the Motown sound. The Trailblazers returned to the UK with a new soul influence and were renamed Funky Fever. They toured the UK and Europe for several years and also played nightclubs in London, including Gulliver's, Whisky a Go Go, The Marquee, Ronnie Scott's, The Scotch of St. James and The Revolution. Funky Fever also backed Inez and Charlie Foxx and The Drifters on their European tours.

Lynsey de Paul and Dudley Moore took an interest in Zakatek's voice, look and stage presence in the early 1970s. De Paul got him signed to Bell Records, dubbed him "Zakatek" and wrote two singles "I Gotcha Now" backed with "So Good To You" (later recorded by de Paul as the B-side on her hit single "Won't Somebody Dance With Me") and singles "Get Your Gun" backed with "Gotta Runaway". A German version of "Get Your Gun" entitled "Roter Mann", with German lyrics by Gunther Gabriel, was recorded by Zakatek and released in 1974 and appeared on a compilation CD released in 2000 De Paul introduced him to the UK through an article in the Daily Mirror entitled "Sugar Girl's Heap Big Find". The musicians who were featured on Zakatek's solo work were already known as some of the members of 10cc.

== Success ==
Between 1974 and 1981, Zakatek was the lead singer with Gonzalez. They recorded successful albums, including Our Only Weapon Is Our Music, and Shipwrecked. A number of singles came from this collaboration, including a cover of "Brandy (You're a Fine Girl)", and the worldwide disco hit, "Haven't Stopped Dancing Yet." In 1977, Zakatek became a studio vocalist for The Alan Parsons Project, singing on their albums over a ten-year period. He was featured on twelve songs from eight Alan Parsons Project albums, including the hits "I Wouldn't Want to Be Like You", "Games People Play", "You Don't Believe," and "Damned If I Do".

== Solo work ==
1979 saw the release of Zakatek's first solo album Lenny Zakatek, which was produced by Alan Parsons for A&M Records. The album produced one single: "Do It Right," backed by the album track "Viens." Other songs released as singles by Zakatek included "Say I Love You" and "Where Is The Love."

RPM magazine reported in its 30 March 1985 edition of the publication that Zakatek had formed a band with David Tyson and Eddie Schwartz in Toronto, where the three rehearsed and developed a series of demos. One of the songs they worked on was "Don't Shed a Tear", which was later recorded by Paul Carrack. The band eventually dissolved after a record deal failed to materialise.

In 1986, Zakatek formed a band called The Immortals, with John Deacon on bass guitar, and Robert Ahwai on lead guitar. Their single "No Turning Back" was included on the soundtrack to the film Biggles. That same year, he guested on the track "Angel", written by Bob Weston, included on the Dick Morrissey album Souliloquy, and which also featured both Ahwai and Weston.

In 1988, he began a parallel career as a manager, music publisher and record producer. He managed and co-produced three of Japan's most prolific recording artists, Tomoyasu Hotei, Miki Imai and Kumiko Yamashita. he also co-wrote and produced several songs on Hotei's first solo album, Guitarhythm. In the UK he managed 7th Heaven, Huff and Herb, and The 3 Jays. The latter two acts achieved successes in the dance market. Zakatek's publishing company All Zakatek Music, co-published some of the cuts on Kubb's debut album. He has published and managed Sony/BMG artist Jah Waggie, the creative alter-ego of Jeff Patterson. Zakatek's second solo album Small But Hard, was released in 1989.

In 1995, Zakatek performed with Joni Mitchell at the Great Music Experience in Nara City, Japan. He shared the stage with INXS, Bon Jovi, Bob Dylan and Tomoyasu Hotei and worked with Michael Kamen, with whom he went to do other projects.

== 2000 onwards ==
Zakatek now plays throughout Europe and the UK with the Boogie Brothers, a 12 piece R&B band. He has also appeared at corporate events both as a solo performer and alongside his son, singer-songwriter Leon Du Platel, and daughter, Amber du Platel.

In March 2010, Zakatek announced a return to the stage playing a selection of Alan Parsons Project songs. He also performed on Frankie Miller's album of duets Frankie Miller's Double Take (2016), appearing with Miller on the track "I Never Want to Lose You". The songs on this album were recorded as demos by Miller prior to his brain haemorrhage in New York in 1994.
