= The Alan Parsons Project =

British rock band (1975–1990)

- Eric Woolfson (left) and Alan Parsons

Background information
- Origin: London, England
- Genres: Progressive pop; art rock; progressive rock; soft rock
- Works: Discography
- Years active: 1975–2014
- Labels: Charisma; Arista
- Formerly of: Ambrosia; Pilot; Lenny Zakatek; Keats; Camel
- Past members: Alan Parsons; Eric Woolfson
- Website: the-alan-parsons-project.com

The Alan Parsons Project were a British rock duo formed in London in 1975. Its official membership consisted of producer, audio engineer, musician and composer Alan Parsons, and singer, songwriter and pianist Eric Woolfson. They shared writing credits on almost all of their songs, with Parsons producing or co-producing all of the recordings, while being accompanied by various session musicians, some relatively consistently to the point that they are considered as members by many fans.

The Alan Parsons Project released eleven studio albums over a 15-year career, the most successful ones being I Robot (1977), The Turn of a Friendly Card (1980) and Eye in the Sky (1982). Many of their albums are conceptual in nature and focus on science fiction, supernatural, literary and sociological themes. Among the group's most popular songs are "I Wouldn't Want to Be Like You", "Games People Play", "Time", "Sirius", "Eye in the Sky", and "Don't Answer Me".

== Career ==
=== 1974–1976: Formation and debut ===
Alan Parsons met Eric Woolfson in the canteen of Abbey Road Studios in the summer of 1974. Parsons was assistant engineer on the Beatles' albums Abbey Road (1969) and Let It Be (1970), engineered Pink Floyd's The Dark Side of the Moon (1973), and produced several acts for EMI Records. Woolfson, a songwriter and composer, was working as a session pianist while composing material for a concept album based on the work of Edgar Allan Poe.

Woolfson's idea was to manage Alan and help his already successful production career. It was the start of a longstanding friendly business relationship. He managed Parsons's career as a producer and engineer through a string of successes, including Pilot, Steve Harley, Cockney Rebel, John Miles, Al Stewart, Ambrosia, and the Hollies. Woolfson came up with the idea of making an album based on developments in the film industry—the focal point of the films' promotion shifted from film stars to directors such as Alfred Hitchcock and Stanley Kubrick. If the film industry was becoming a director's medium, Woolfson felt the music business might well become a producer's medium.

Recalling his earlier Edgar Allan Poe material, Woolfson saw a way to combine his and Parsons's talents. Parsons produced and engineered songs written and composed by the two, and the first Alan Parsons Project was begun. The Project's first album, Tales of Mystery and Imagination (1976), released by 20th Century Fox Records and including major contributions by all members of Pilot and Ambrosia, was a success, reaching the Top 40 in the US Billboard 200 chart. The song "The Raven" featured lead vocals by the actor Leonard Whiting. According to the 2007 re-mastered album liner notes, this was the first rock song to use a vocoder, with Alan Parsons speaking lyrics through it, although others such as Bruce Haack pioneered this field in the previous decade.

=== 1977–1990: Mainstream success and final releases ===
Arista Records then signed the Alan Parsons Project for further albums. Through the late 1970s and early 1980s, the Project's popularity continued to grow. The Project was always more popular in North America, Ibero-America, and Continental Europe than in Parsons' home country, never achieving a UK Top 40 single or Top 20 album. The singles "I Wouldn't Want to Be Like You", "Games People Play", "Damned If I Do", "Time" (the first single to feature Woolfson's lead vocal) and "Eye in the Sky" had a notable impact on the Billboard Hot 100. "Don't Answer Me" became the Project's last top 20 single in the United States; it reached the top 15 on the American charts in 1984.

After those successes, the Project began to fade from view. There were fewer hit singles, and declining album sales. 1987's Gaudi was the Project's final release, though it had planned to record an album called Freudiana (1990) next.

==== The musical Freudiana ====
Even though the studio version of Freudiana was produced by Parsons (and featured the regular Project session musicians, making it an 'unofficial' Project album), it was primarily Woolfson's idea to turn it into a musical. While Parsons pursued his own solo career and took many session players of the Project on the road for the first time in a successful worldwide tour, Woolfson went on to produce musical plays influenced by the Project's music. Freudiana, Gaudi, and Gambler were three musicals that included some Project songs like "Eye in the Sky", "Time", "Inside Looking Out", and "Limelight". The live music from Gambler was only distributed at the performance site in Mönchengladbach, Germany.

==== The Sicilian Defence ====
In 1979, Parsons, Woolfson, and their record label Arista, had been stalled in contract renegotiations when the two submitted an all-instrumental album tentatively titled The Sicilian Defence, named after a chess opening. According to Parsons, the album was not intended to be released and was instead recorded with the goal of renegotiating a more favorable record deal with Arista, who ultimately refused to release the album and subsequently coordinated with the band to secure a new contract.

Woolfson said that he planned to release one track from the "Sicilian" album, which in 2008 appeared as a bonus track on a CD re-issue of the Eve album under the name "Elsie's Theme". Sometime later, after he had relocated the original tapes, Parsons reluctantly agreed to release the album and announced that it would finally be released on an upcoming Project box set called The Complete Albums Collection in 2014 for the first time as a bonus disc.

It was made almost as a throwaway, contractual obligation album. It was made very quickly. We delivered Eve and The Sicilian Defence simultaneously and told the label “There are your last two albums. Now, give us a new deal.” [laughs] There were all kinds of politics that went on at the time. The Sicilian Defence is very instrumental. I don’t think there’s a single vocal on it. We’ve been pretty protective of it. I haven’t even possessed a copy of it since 1979 when it was made. Don’t hold your breath on this one. It’s interesting, but not the greatest piece of work.

— Alan Parsons, 2013

I'm happy that it's fulfilling a need to document, historically, the entire catalog of the Alan Parsons project, but it's not our finest hour by any stretch of the imagination. It was an album made under pressure. It doesn't have the polish or finesse that all the albums that were released previously had. It's really not up to the standard of the real Project albums. We just wanted to get it done. It was made in a hurry. It took three days, and that was a very small amount of time compared with the sometimes three or four months we might have spent making a proper album. 'The Sicilian Defense' is the title of a tactical move in the game of chess, but there was a real game of tactics going on in a very real sense with Eric and the label. Like I said, it's an interesting piece of history.

— Alan Parsons, 2014

== Parsons's and Woolfson's solo careers ==
Parsons released titles under his name: Try Anything Once (1993), On Air (1996), The Time Machine (1999), A Valid Path (2004), The Secret (2019) and From the New World (2022). Meanwhile, Woolfson made concept albums titled Freudiana (1990), about Sigmund Freud's work on psychology, and Poe: More Tales of Mystery and Imagination (2003), continuing from the Alan Parsons Project's first album about Poe literature.

Tales of Mystery and Imagination (1976) was re-mixed in 1987 for release on CD, and included narration by Orson Welles recorded in 1975, but delivered too late to be included on the original album. For the 2007 deluxe edition release, parts of this tape were used for the 1976 Griffith Park Planetarium launch of the original album, the 1987 remix, and various radio spots. All were included as bonus material.

== Artistry ==
=== Musical style and instrumentation ===
The band's music is described as progressive rock, art rock, progressive pop, and soft rock. "Sirius" is the best known and most frequently heard of all Parsons/Woolfson songs. It was used as entrance music by various American sports teams, notably by the Chicago Bulls during their 1990s NBA dynasty, and is currently used as an entrance theme for the Nebraska Cornhuskers college football team. It was also used as the entrance theme for Ricky Steamboat in pro wrestling of the mid-1980s. In addition, "Sirius" is played in a variety of TV shows and movies including the BBC Television series Record Breakers, the episode "Vanishing Act" of The Adventures of Jimmy Neutron: Boy Genius, and the 2009 film Cloudy with a Chance of Meatballs.

Vocal duties were shared by guests to complement each song. In later years, Woolfson sang lead on many of the group's hits, including "Time", "Eye in the Sky", and "Don't Answer Me". The record company pressured Parsons to use Woolfson more, but Parsons preferred to use more polished proficient singers and Woolfson admitted he was not in that category. In addition to Woolfson, vocalists Chris Rainbow, Lenny Zakatek, John Miles, David Paton, and Colin Blunstone are regulars. Other singers, such as Arthur Brown, Steve Harley, Gary Brooker, Dave Terry a.k.a. Elmer Gantry, Vitamin Z's Geoff Barradale, and Marmalade's Dean Ford, recorded only once or twice with the Project. Parsons sang lead on one song ("The Raven") through a vocoder and backing on a few others, including "To One in Paradise". Both of those songs appeared on Tales of Mystery and Imagination (1976). Parsons also sings a prominent counter melody on "Time".

A variety of session musicians worked with the Alan Parsons Project regularly, contributing to the recognizable style of a song despite the varied singer line-up. With Parsons and Woolfson, the studio band consisted of the group Pilot, with Ian Bairnson (guitar), David Paton (bass) and Stuart Tosh (drums). Pilot's keyboardist Billy Lyall contributed. From Pyramid (1978) onward, Tosh was replaced by Stuart Elliott of Cockney Rebel. Bairnson played on all albums, and Paton stayed almost until the end. Andrew Powell appeared as arranger of orchestra (and often choirs) on all albums except Vulture Culture (1985); he was composing the score of Richard Donner's film Ladyhawke (1985). This score was partly in the APP style, recorded by most of the APP regulars, and produced and engineered by Parsons. Powell composed some material for the first two Project albums. For Vulture Culture and later, Richard Cottle played as a regular contributor on synthesizers and saxophone.

=== Live performances ===
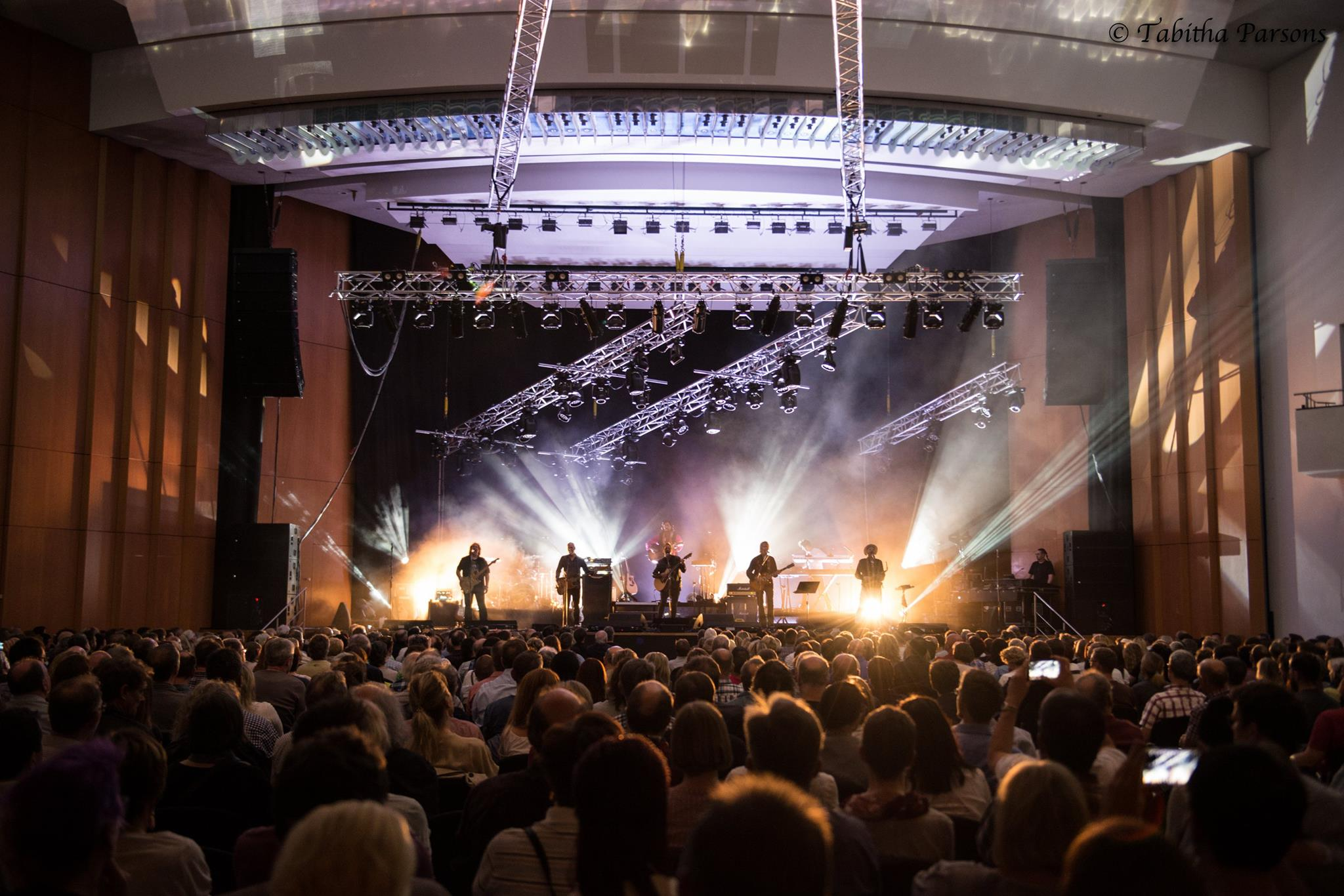
Alan Parsons Live Project, Congress Centrum, Ulm Germany in 2017

The Alan Parsons Project played live only once under that name during its original incarnation because Woolfson and Parsons held the roles of writing and production, and because of the technical difficulties of re-producing on stage the complex instrumentation used in the studio. In the 1990s, musical production evolved with the technology of digital samplers. The one occasion the band was introduced as 'the Alan Parsons Project' in a live performance was at The Night of the Proms, in Brussels, in October 1990. The concerts featured all Project regulars except Woolfson, present behind the scenes, while Parsons stayed at the mixer except for the last song, when he played acoustic guitar.

Since 1993, the Alan Parsons Live Project, named to distinguish itself from the Alan Parsons Project, has continued performing. The current line up consists of lead singer P.J. Olsson, guitarist Jeffrey Kollman, drummer Danny Thompson, keyboardist Tom Brooks, bass guitarist Guy Erez, vocalist and saxophonist Todd Cooper, and guitarist and vocalist Dan Tracey.

In 2013, Alan Parsons Live Project including Alan Parsons played in Colombia with a full choir and orchestra (the Medellín Philharmonic) as 'Alan Parsons Symphonic Project'. A 2-CD live set and a DVD version of this concert were released in May 2016.

== Members ==
Official members

- Alan Parsons – production, engineering, programming, composition, vocals, keyboards, guitars (1975–1990)
- Eric Woolfson – composition, lyrics, piano, keyboards, vocals, executive production (1975–1990; died 2009)

Notable contributors

- Andrew Powell – composition, keyboards, orchestral arrangements (1975–1996)
- Philharmonia Orchestra
- Ian Bairnson – guitars (1975–1990; died 2023)
- David Pack – guitars (1976, 1993), vocals, keyboards (1993)
- Richard Cottle – keyboards, saxophone (1984–1990)
- David Paton – bass (1975–1986), vocals (1975–1986, 1990), acoustic guitar (1990)
- Stuart Tosh – drums, percussion (1975–1977)
- Stuart Elliott – drums, percussion (1977–1990)
- Mel Collins – saxophone (1982–1984)
- Geoff Barradale – vocals (1987)
- Phil Kenzie – saxophone (1978)
- Andy Kanavan – percussion (1993)
- Dennis Clarke – saxophone (1980)
- Colin Blunstone – vocals (1978–1984)
- Gary Brooker – vocals (1985, 1990), keyboards (1990; died 2022)
- Arthur Brown – vocals (1975)
- Lesley Duncan – vocals (1979; died 2010)
- Graham Dye – vocals (1985, 1998)
- Dean Ford – vocals (1978; died 2018)
- Dave Terry ("Elmer Gantry") – vocals (1980, 1982)
- Jack Harris – vocals (1976–1978)
- The Hollies – vocals
- John Miles – vocals, guitar (1976, 1978, 1985, 1987, 1990; died 2021)
- Chris Rainbow – vocals (1979–1990; died 2015)
- Eric Stewart – vocals (1990, 1993)
- Peter Straker – vocals (1977)
- Clare Torry – vocals (1979)
- Dave Townsend – vocals (1977, 1979)
- Lenny Zakatek – vocals (1977–1987)
- The English Chorale – choir (1976, 1977, 1982, 1987)

== Discography ==
- Tales of Mystery and Imagination (1976)
- I Robot (1977)
- Pyramid (1978)
- Eve (1979)
- The Turn of a Friendly Card (1980)
- Eye in the Sky (1982)
- Ammonia Avenue (1984)
- Vulture Culture (1985)
- Stereotomy (1985)
- Gaudi (1987)
- The Sicilian Defence (2014)
