= Chris Rainbow =

Scottish pop rock singer and musician (1946–2015)

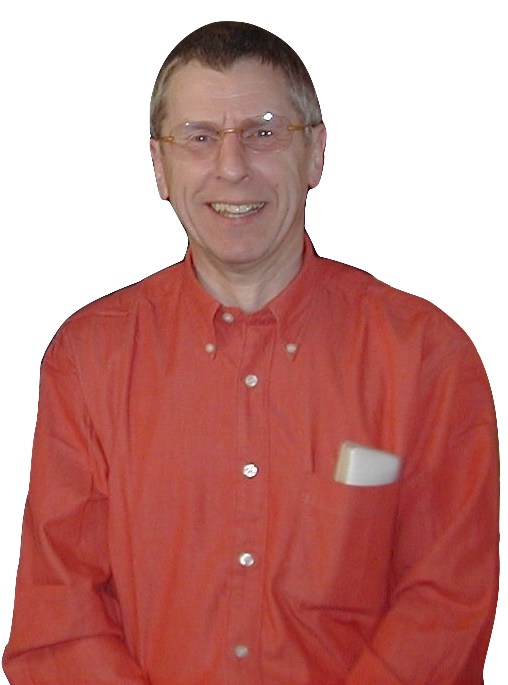
- Rainbow in 2001

Background information
- Also known as: Christopher Rainbow
- Born: Christopher James Harley; 18 November 1946; Glasgow, Scotland
- Died: 22 February 2015 (aged 68) Isle of Skye, Scotland
- Genres: Pop rock; progressive rock
- Occupations: Singer; record producer; songwriter
- Years active: 1971–2015
- Labels: EMI; Polydor; Vital Spark Music

Christopher James Harley, known by his stage name Chris Rainbow (18 November 1946 – 22 February 2015), was a Scottish pop rock singer-songwriter and musician, known for his solo work and his significant contributions to The Alan Parsons Project from 1979, as well as his work as a backing and occasional lead vocalist for Camel in the 1980s. Rainbow also composed jingles for Radio One and Capital Radio.

Rainbow's solo songs such as "Give Me What I Cry For" and "Solid State Brain" received positive critical reception upon release, and were played by British radio DJs Kenny Everett and Tony Blackburn in the early 1970s. Due to exposure on TikTok, Rainbow's 1979 song "Be Like a Woman" made its chart debut in February 2026 on the UK Independent Singles Breakers Chart, peaking at No. 15. It also reached No. 16 on the Billboard Hot Rock & Alternative Songs chart, No. 92 on the Billboard Hot 100, No. 75 on the Canada Hot 100, and amassed over 140 million streams on Spotify.

Through his career, Rainbow contributed to many other projects by various artists both as musician and producer; his long-time collaborator Alan Parsons stated he was a "One Man Beach Boys" in a posthumous tribute.

== Early life and name ==
He was born the son of James Harley and Pamela Clapham. He adopted the stage name "Rainbow" to avoid confusion with Steve Harley, saying:

Steve Harley was at his peak and I didn't want any confusion. The name Rainbow was found one evening as me and some friends were watching TV and the reporter's name flashed on the screen as "Christopher Rainbow", so that was that.

Before music, Rainbow worked through a variety of occupations including doing promotional work for Dream Police, contributing cartoons to Glasgow underground paper The Word, and studying at the Society for Psychic Research. Rainbow had a stutter which wasn't apparent when he sang.

== Career ==
In 1972 and 1973, Rainbow was involved in a band called Hopestreet – along with Scottish pianist and composer Callum Kenmuir – recording two singles, Iron Sky / Never Mind and Wait Until Tomorrow / Ladies (At The Bottom Of A Garden). Following this, he recorded the singles Give Me What I Cry For and Solid State Brain in 1974, and Mr. Man and Gimme Just A Little Beat Of Your Heart in 1975 (as Christopher Rainbow).

Slightly shortening his name to Chris Rainbow, he later released three solo albums; Home of the Brave in 1975, Looking Over My Shoulder in 1978, and White Trails in 1979. Tracks from these albums are collected on The Best Of Chris Rainbow released in 1994, The Best of Chris Rainbow, 1972–1980, released in 2000, and The Chris Rainbow Anthology 1974-1981 released in 2001, which also includes radio spots and other rare material. Rainbow also did music for EMI's project Body Music, which included three of his songs along with Brian Aris's photography.

Rainbow received wider recognition for his music through the support of Kenny Everett, then on Capital Radio in London, who featured his music extensively. Some of the jingles that Rainbow made for Capital at this time were later released on Unreleased & Demo Tracks 1973-1983 in 2000 and Waves in 2007, albums that include other outtakes, demos and previously unreleased material.

In 1979, Rainbow also began his long association with The Alan Parsons Project, recording on many of their albums from Eve through Alan Parsons' 1999 solo album, The Time Machine. He also appeared on other Alan Parsons's associated works, such as Panorama's Can This Be Paradise in 1982 (with Ian Bairnson and German keyboard player Hermann Weindorf), and Eric Woolfson and Alan Parsons's Freudiana in 1990.

Rainbow would tour with Jon Anderson in 1980 and do vocal work on Song of Seven in 1980 and Animation in 1983.

In the early 1980s, Rainbow joined Camel, appearing on the albums The Single Factor and Stationary Traveller, and performing with them on their 1982 and 1984 tours, recordings of which were released as the album Pressure Points. Rainbow would do vocal work on Heart Of The Universe, a solo album by Ton Scherpenzeel who was the keyboardist of Camel in 1984.

Rainbow would contribute vocal work on a large variety of albums throughout his career, including Blonde on Blonde's And How! in 1978, Max Middleton and Robert Ahwai's Another Sleeper in 1979, Killdozer's self-titled album Killdozer in 1980, Trevor Herion's Beauty Life in 1983, Elaine Page's self-titled album Elaine in 1983, Culture Club's Waking Up with the House on Fire in 1984, Toyah Willcox's Desire in 1987, Lenny Zakatek's Small But Hard in 1989, and Tomoyasu Hotei's King & Queen in 1996 and Fetish in 2000.

== Production ==
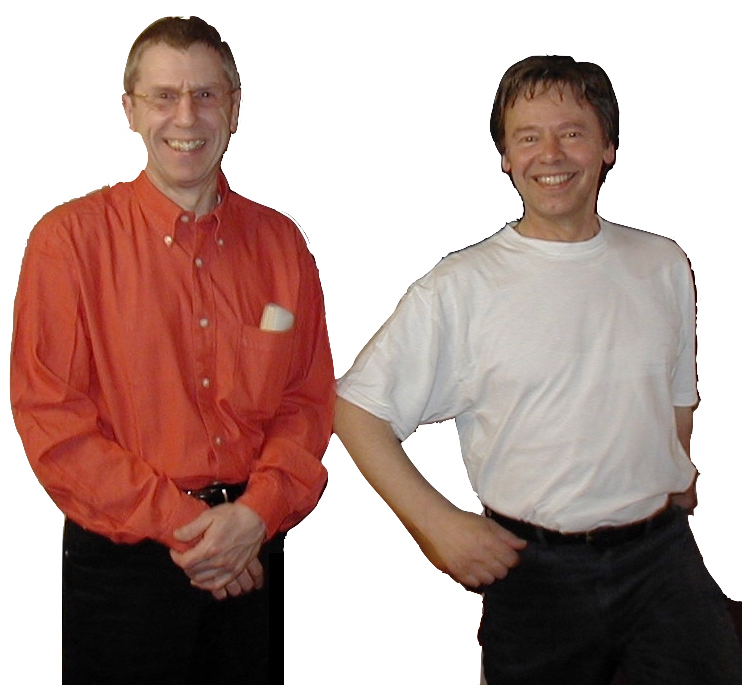
Chris Rainbow and David Paton, on tour with Donnie Munro in Germany 2001

Rainbow worked as a producer on various singles and albums in the UK in the 1970s and 1980s, including the singles "It Doesn't Really Matter Now" by Justin & Wylde in 1975, "Such a Lovely Night" and "Cafe a Go Go" by Sunfighter in 1976 and 1977 respectively, The song "Does It Rain (When You Get Lonely)" the B-side of the single "Steady Love" by Nobby Clark from Bay City Rollers in 1977, and Les Lavin's "Love's at the Bottom" in 1980. Rainbow was producer on Lennie Macdonald's Hard Road in 1975, Dave Lewis's From Time to Time in 1976 and John Townley's Townley in 1979. Rainbow also did production work alongside Max Middleton under the alias Maximum Penetration, which had one self-titled single, "Maximum Penetration" in 1980.

Rainbow produced several albums for the Scottish Gaelic rock group Runrig starting with the single Loch Lomond in 1982, then the albums Heartland in 1985, The Cutter and the Clan in 1987, Once in a Lifetime in 1988, Capture the Heart in 1990, The Big Wheel in 1991, Amazing Things in 1993, and In Search of Angels in 1999, all under his birth name Chris Harley. Rainbow also produced solo work for previous Runrig members Blair Douglas and Donnie Munro with Douglas's albums Beneath the Beret in 1990 and A Summer in Skye in 1996, and Munro's On the West Side in 1999, Donnie Munro – Live in 2001, Across the City and the World in 2002, the single Down Under in 2003, Gaelic Heart in 2003, and Heart of America – Across the Great Divide in 2006. In 1987, Rainbow produced R.A.F.'s album Restless Spirit. Rainbow produced music for R.A.F.'s lead singer David Valentine previously in 1976 with the single "Second Hand Ladies" and again in 1986 under the name Harley with the single "We Can Only Dream". He also produced a single by The River Detectives, "Saturday Night Sunday Morning", in 1989 and their studio album Elvis Has Left the Building in 1996. Rainbow produced Wolfstone's album The Half Tail in 1996.

== Studio ==
Rainbow built and ran the Vital Spark Music Studio on the Isle of Skye where several artists including Donnie Munro, Blair Douglas, and KT Tunstall recorded albums. In 2000 he was said to be working on what would have been his fourth solo album, to be called In a Perfect World. It was never released. Vital Spark did provide music to EM Records for the releases The Instrumental Chris Rainbow (also featuring British jazz luminaries Ronnie Scott and Dick Morrissey) and Love You Eternally E.P. in 2000, with one of the tracks, 'Sea Drift', originally intended for In a Perfect World.

== Death ==
Chris Rainbow died on 22 February 2015 of Parkinson's disease at his home on the Isle of Skye. He was surrounded by his wife and son.

Alan Parsons published on his official website, "It was with great sadness that I read today of the passing of Chris Rainbow. He was an amazing talent and an integral part of The Project sound. Eric and I used to call him the "One Man Beach Boys". I will always remember his funny stories, his mimicking ability, and his hilarious catch phrases. Sessions with him were always filled with laughter. I will miss him greatly."

Following Rainbow's death, Runrig published the following statement on their website: "We were all shocked and saddened to hear yesterday of the death of friend, colleague, and former record producer Chris Harley. Chris was a major part of the Runrig story, producing the breakthrough albums through the eighties and early nineties. In his capacity as a producer, he was instrumental in helping to create the sound of the band. Chris was held in deep affection by all associated with Runrig and his passing will be keenly felt." . Camel's Andy Latimer said "So sad to hear of the passing of Chris Rainbow. He was an amazing talent and a friend. RIP.”

On hearing of Rainbow's death, Brian Wilson posted on his official website, "I felt really bad to hear about Chris Rainbow passing away, he was too young. I remember in the late 1970s, a friend played 'Dear Brian' for me and I was touched and honored by it. It was a beautiful track. I wish the best for Chris's family and friends. Love & Mercy, Brian."

== Discography ==
- Home of the Brave (1975)
- Looking Over My Shoulder (1978)
- White Trails (1979)
