= Eric Woolfson =

Scottish musician and songwriter (1945–2009)

Background information
- Born: Eric Norman Woolfson; 18 March 1945; Charing Cross, Glasgow, Scotland
- Origin: Pollokshields, Glasgow, Scotland
- Died: 2 December 2009 (aged 64) London, England
- Genres: Progressive rock, soft rock, pop rock, musical theatre
- Occupations: Singer, songwriter, musician
- Instruments: Piano, keyboards, vocals
- Years active: 1960s–2009
- Formerly of: The Alan Parsons Project
- Website: ericwoolfsonmusic.com

Eric Norman Woolfson (18 March 1945 – 2 December 2009) was a Scottish songwriter, vocalist, pianist, executive producer, and co-creator of the band the Alan Parsons Project, together with Alan Parsons, who sold over 50 million albums worldwide. Woolfson also pursued a career in musical theatre.

== Early life ==
Woolfson was born into a Jewish family in the Charing Cross area of Glasgow, where his family owned the Elders furniture store. He was raised in the Pollokshields area on the south side of the city and educated at the High School of Glasgow. Woolfson's interest in music was inspired by an uncle and he taught himself to play the piano. After leaving school, he briefly flirted with becoming an accountant before moving to London to seek opportunities in the music industry.

== Early career ==
Arriving in London in 1963, he found work as a session pianist. The then current record producer for the Rolling Stones, Andrew Loog Oldham, signed him as a songwriter. During the following years, Woolfson wrote songs for artists such as Marianne Faithfull, Frank Ifield, Joe Dassin, the Tremeloes, Marie (French singer), Marmalade, Dave Berry, Peter Noone, and the Poets. In due course Woolfson signed other publishing deals as more of his songs were adopted by leading recording artists, throughout Europe and America. He also signed a deal with Southern Music, where he worked alongside composers and lyricists such as Andrew Lloyd Webber and Tim Rice.

In 1971, with the assistance of Eric Stewart, Kevin Godley, Lol Creme and Graham Gouldman (who later became 10cc), a single was produced under the name of Eric Elder ("San Tokay" b/w "Sunflower") and issued on UK Philips 6006 081 and US Philips 40699. Woolfson then produced a single by Graham Gouldman ("Nowhere to Go" b/w "Growing Older") which was issued in 1972 on UK CBS 7739. In the late 1960s and early 1970s, Woolfson was an independent record producer for several record companies, and worked with artists including Dave Berry, the Equals, the Tremeloes and, in 1973, Darren Burn. Despite his success, he found that earning a living as a songwriter was not easy and decided to try artist management.

His move into management was instantly successful. His first two signings were Carl Douglas (whose record "Kung Fu Fighting" (1974) was one of the biggest selling hits of all time) and engineer/record producer Alan Parsons.

== The Alan Parsons Project ==
In 1974, Woolfson met record producer Alan Parsons at the Abbey Road Studios in London where both were working on different projects. Parsons asked Woolfson to become his manager and they worked together with a number of bands and artists including Pilot, Cockney Rebel, John Miles, Al Stewart, Ambrosia and the Hollies.

Subsequently, Woolfson and Parsons formed the Alan Parsons Project, the name originally being intended as a working title for their collaborative project. From 1976 to 1987, Woolfson and Parsons collaborated on the conception and lyrics for all ten albums by the Alan Parsons Project, which have achieved worldwide album sales in excess of 50 million.

On every Project album, Woolfson would sing a guide vocal track for each song, which the album's eventual lead vocalists would use as a reference. Some of these tracks can be heard on the new remastered editions of various Project albums released in 2007. Woolfson himself was the actual singer on many of the Project's biggest hits such as "Time", "Don't Answer Me", "Prime Time" and the band's signature tune "Eye in the Sky", which peaked at No. 3 on the Billboard Hot 100 on 16–30 October 1982.

== Solo career ==
Freudiana was originally meant to be the 11th album by the Alan Parsons Project, but Woolfson was keen to explore the possibility of realising the project as a musical. While recording the album, Brian Brolly was introduced to Woolfson and promised to steer the album in this new direction. Brolly was previously a partner with Andrew Lloyd Webber, and together they created such musicals as Cats. With some help from Brolly, Woolfson was able to turn Freudiana into a stage musical.

Before the Freudiana stage production opened in 1990 in Vienna, a double-length studio album was released. The musical had a successful run, and it was planned that the show would open in other cities. However, plans were put on hold when a lawsuit broke out between Brolly and Woolfson, each fighting for control of the project. The studio disc (the "white" album) was quite difficult to obtain for a while. There was also a double-length German-language cast disc (the "black" album).

== Musical theatre ==
Woolfson explained his career switch during an interview in 2004:

I eventually developed The Alan Parsons Project as a vehicle but then I realised that there was more to it than that and that Andrew Lloyd Webber was right and that the stage musical was a fulfilling media for a writer like myself. I got into stage musicals in the mid-1980s.

His first three musicals were Freudiana (1990), about Sigmund Freud; Gaudi (1993), about Antonio Gaudi, and Gambler (1996). A fourth musical Edgar Allan POE, based on the life of the author, was given a world premiere concert production at Abbey Road studios, London in 2003. An album was released in 2003 as Poe: More Tales of Mystery and Imagination (this contains some but not all of the songs from the stage version), and a musical album CD Edgar Allan Poe (containing the complete musical score of 17 songs) and a DVD of the POE Abbey Road concert were released in 2009.

Dancing with Shadows (inspired by the anti-war play Forest Fire by the Korean playwright Cham Bum-Suk and with a book by Ariel Dorfman) was premiered in July 2007 in Korea.

== Personal life ==
Woolfson married his wife Hazel in 1969 and they had two daughters and four grandchildren. Politically, he was a centrist, supporting the Social Democratic Party (SDP) throughout the 1980s. A friend of the SDP's second leader, David Owen, Woolfson refused to back the party's merger with the Liberal Party in 1988 and instead followed Owen into the 'continuing' SDP, of which he was a trustee (alongside David Sainsbury and Sir Leslie Murphy) until it was dissolved in 1990. According to his daughter, Woolfson was a "confirmed but respectful atheist".

== Death ==
Woolfson died from kidney cancer in London on 2 December 2009. He is buried in Cathcart Cemetery near Glasgow.

== Discography ==
=== As solo artist ===
- 1971 San Tokay b/w Sunflower (as ERIC ELDER) UK and US Philips (arranged and produced by 10cc)
- 1990 Freudiana (with The Alan Parsons Project line-up)
- 1991 Black Freudiana – Deutsche Originalaufnahme (Austrian Original Cast Musical Soundtrack)
- 1995 Gaudi (musical)
- 1997 Gambler (Das Geheimnis der Karten)
- 2003 Poe: More Tales of Mystery and Imagination
- 2007 Dancing Shadows
- 2009 The Alan Parsons Project That Never Was
- 2009 Edgar Allan Poe: A Musical
- 2013 Somewhere in the Audience, released on 18 March 2013, the anniversary of Woolfson's birthday

=== As part of The Alan Parsons Project ===
- 1976 Tales of Mystery and Imagination
- 1977 I Robot
- 1978 Pyramid
- 1979 Eve
- 1980 The Turn of a Friendly Card
- 1982 Eye in the Sky
- 1984 Ammonia Avenue
- 1985 Vulture Culture
- 1985 Stereotomy
- 1987 Gaudi
- 2014 The Sicilian Defence (recorded 1979)
