= Stuart Elliott (drummer) =

English drummer (born 1953)

Stuart Alexander Elliott (born 22 May 1953) is an English drummer. He was the original drummer for Steve Harley and Cockney Rebel and during his time with this band he became a session drummer playing for top artists such as Kate Bush, Al Stewart, The Alan Parsons Project, David Byron, Roger Daltrey, Paul McCartney, Claudio Baglioni, Lucio Battisti, among others.

== Biography ==
Elliott was born in London, England. He started to be interested in playing drums at the age of three by watching his father who was a jazz drummer. "Until I was fifteen, I was educated at St. Michael's School, Belgravia. Since then I have done a bit of session work, including a tour with Adam Faith and drifted through a number of rock bands until someone who heard me do a gig with a band called Monksilver mentioned me to Steve Harley. We soon discovered we could communicate on the same level, and having joined the band, I quickly realised that I had found my niche in rock music."

With Steve Harley and Cockney Rebel, Elliott enjoyed three top 10 albums including the number 1 single "Make Me Smile (Come Up and See Me)" and other four top 10 singles. In January 1976, Elliott went to Abbey Road Studios to play drums for Al Stewart's album Year of the Cat. After Steve Harley disbanded Cockney Rebel in 1977, Elliott was called by Andrew Powell to play drums on Kate Bush's first album, The Kick Inside. This would be first of the five albums with Elliott on drums as he became one of Bush's preferred drummers. "He's so easy to work with because he knows what I'm like. Occasionally I'll even ask him to use cymbals on a track now! He's been through that whole stage where I just couldn't handle cymbals or hi-hats." Elliott later on played drums on hits such as "Babooshka", "Running Up That Hill", "Hounds of Love" and "Cloudbusting". Between September 1977 and January 1978, Elliott went on to play drums on The Alan Parsons Project third album, Pyramid, which would be the first of ten albums where he became part of the rhythm section, and he continued playing and contributed in the songwriting for the next three solo albums of Parsons.

During the 1980s, his career as session drummer emerged. As well as continuing session drumming for Kate Bush and The Alan Parsons Project he went to on to play for Justin Hayward's song "Suitcase", from the album Night Flight in 1980. In 1984, he played drums on Paul McCartney's hit "No More Lonely Nights". That same year he and the rest of The Alan Parsons Project core musicians team, Ian Bairnson and David Paton, were joined by the singer Colin Blunstone and Camel's keyboardist Peter Bardens, and formed Keats. Elliott not only played drums and percussion, he also took part in the songwriting and, with Colin Blunstone, he wrote "Tragedy" and "Night Full of Voices". Particularly noteworthy, with Colin Blunstone he also wrote "Where Do We Go From Here" and "Helen Loves Paris", which Blunstone released as a single in 1985.

Elliott appeared on various TV shows including Top of the Pops playing with Tina Turner, Eric Clapton, Roxy Music and Kate Bush. He also appeared with Bryan Adams on the music video for Roger Daltrey's song "Let Me Down Easy". Bush included Elliott in her music videos of "Big Sky" (where his brother, Lindsay Elliott, was on drums), and of "Rubberband Girl".

In 1993, Elliott joined Alan Parsons again to record Try Anything Once, they would then continue recording two more studio albums, On Air and The Time Machine, and, for the first and only time, he took the lead on vocals for a song co-written by Andrew Powell, "Take The Money and Run", which appeared on The Very Best Live album. With Alan Parsons, Ian Bairnson and other different musicians and singers, he toured from 1994 to 2002 covering the US, South America, Japan and big part of Europe. During this period he played at the Night of the Proms in 1997 as part of the Alan Parsons performance and with Simple Minds, Deborah Harry and Paul Young.

After splitting with Alan Parsons, Elliott did a library album (music made specifically to be used in TV and film). He toured again with Steve Harley various times. Elliott also played with Jon Anderson and Alice Cooper on the Ultimate British Rock Symphony Tour.

In 2013, Elliott got together with Al Stewart to play at the Royal Albert Hall tracks from the Year of the Cat album. They played again together at the same venue in 2015. In May 2015 he was called again by Andrew Powell along with David Paton and Tim Renwick to record an album for singer and actor Jules Knight, and in August he started to record with Al Stewart's musician Dave Nachmanoff.

In November 2015, Elliott toured with Steve Harley and original members to celebrate the 40th anniversary of The Best Years of Our Lives. After 2015, Elliott remained a consistent member of Cockney Rebel until Harley's 2024 death, having previously returned to the band sporadically pre-2015 during a couple of Harley's tours in the early to mid-2000s and in 2010.

== Other instruments ==
Stuart can also play bass guitar, guitar and piano, triangle, simmons, tambourine, xylophone, guiro, wind-chimes, keyboards, castanets and gong.
