= The Secret (Alan Parsons album) =

Studio album by Alan Parsons
- Released: 26 April 2019
- Recorded: 2018–2019
- Studio: ParSonics (Santa Barbara, California)
- Genre: Progressive rock
- Length: 48:20
- Label: Frontiers
- Producer: Alan Parsons

Alan Parsons chronology
A Valid Path (2004)	The Secret (2019)	From the New World (2022)

Singles from The Secret
- 1. "Miracle" Released: February 2019; 2. "I Can't Get There from Here" Released: March 2019; 3. "As Lights Fall" Released: April 2019

Professional ratings
Review scores
Source	Rating
AllMusic	3/5 stars
Spill Magazine	9/10

The Secret is the fifth solo album by English rock musician Alan Parsons. It was released on 26 April 2019 via Frontiers. Guest appearances include guitarist Steve Hackett on the first track, Jason Mraz singing on "Miracle", and Lou Gramm singing on "Sometimes".

The roots of the song "I Can't Get There From Here" go back to the year 2002, when Alan Parsons was asked to do the music for the film "5-25-77" by Patrick Read Johnson. Despite Parsons' assertion in 2005 that the film would soon be finished, it took over ten years more until it was finally premiered.

== Track listing ==
No.	Title	Lead vocalist	Length
1.	"The Sorcerer's Apprentice" (Paul Dukas, arranged by Tom Brooks and Alan Parsons)	none	5:44
2.	"Miracle" (Guy Erez, Andy Ellis and Alan Parsons)	Jason Mraz	3:22
3.	"As Lights Fall" (Dan Tracey and Alan Parsons)	Alan Parsons	3:58
4.	"One Note Symphony" (Todd Cooper, Tom Brooks and Alan Parsons)	Todd Cooper	4:43
5.	"Sometimes" (Patrick Anthony Caddick and Alan Parsons)	Lou Gramm	5:08
6.	"Soirée Fantastique" (Todd Cooper, Doug Powell, Tom Brooks and Alan Parsons)	Alan Parsons and Todd Cooper	5:27
7.	"Fly to Me" (Mark Mikel, Jeff Kollman and Alan Parsons)	Mark Mikel	3:45
8.	"Requiem" (Todd Cooper, Doug Powell, Boh Cooper and Alan Parsons)	Todd Cooper	4:02
9.	"Years of Glory" (P.J. Olsson and Alan Parsons)	P.J. Olsson	4:05
10.	"The Limelight Fades Away" (Jordan Huffman, Dan Tracey and Alan Parsons)	Jordan Huffman	3:36
11.	"I Can't Get There from Here" (Patrick Read Johnson, David Russo, Jared Mahone and Alan Parsons)	Jared Mahone	4:38
Total length:			48:20

Adapted from Blabbermouth.net.

== Personnel ==
- Lead vocals: Jason Mraz, Lou Gramm, Alan Parsons, Todd Cooper, P. J. Olsson, Jordan Asher Huffman, Jared Mahone, Mark Mikel
- Additional vocals: Alan Parsons, Todd Cooper, Dan Tracey, Jordan Asher Huffman, P. J. Olsson, Carl–Magnus "C-M" Carlsson, Andy Ellis, Doug Powell
- Narration: Alan Parsons
- Guitars: Steve Hackett, Jeff Kollman, Dan Tracey, Tony Rosacci, Ian Bairnson, Alan Parsons
- Synth, keyboards: Andy Ellis, Tom Brooks, Dan Tracey, Alan Parsons
- Piano: Pat Caddick, Angelo Pizzaro, Tom Brooks
- Bass: Nathan East, Guy Erez, Jeff Peterson
- Drums: Vinnie Colaiuta, Danny Thompson, Carl Sorensen
- Saxophone: Todd Cooper
- Orchestra: The CMG Music Recording Orchestra of Hollywood
- Orchestral arrangements: Tom Brooks, Dan Tracey, Milton Olsson
- Orchestra conductors: Tom Brooks, Alan Parsons
- Cello: Michael Fitzpatrick
- Percussion: Alan Parsons, Todd Cooper
- Ukulele: Jake Shimabukuro
- Trombones: Oscar Utterström
- Trumpets: Vinnie Ciesielski
- Recording engineers: Noah Bruskin, Alan Parsons, Grant Goddard
- Mixing engineers: Alan Parsons, Noah Bruskin
- Assistant engineers: Jeff Fitzpatrick
- Additional engineering: Tre Nagella, Dave Albro, Andy Ellis
- Mastering engineer: Dave Donnelly
- Producer: Alan Parsons

== Charts ==
Chart (2019)	Peak position
Austrian Albums (Ö3 Austria)	36
Belgian Albums (Ultratop Flanders)	55
Belgian Albums (Ultratop Wallonia)	44
Dutch Albums (Album Top 100)	20
French Albums (SNEP)	157
German Albums (Offizielle Top 100)	12
Italian Albums (FIMI)	31
Polish Albums (ZPAV)	40
Scottish Albums (OCC)	33
Spanish Albums (PROMUSICAE)	49
Swiss Albums (Schweizer Hitparade)	13
US Billboard Top Album Sales	36
