= Alan Parsons Symphonic Project, Live in Colombia =

Live in Colombia

Live album by The Alan Parsons Symphonic Project
- Released: 27 May 2016
- Recorded: 31 August 2013
- Venue: Barefoot Park, Medellín, Colombia
- Genre: Symphonic rock
- Length: 1:43:34
- Label: earMUSIC
- Producer: Alan Parsons

Live in Colombia is a live concert performance by the Alan Parsons Symphonic Project released on double CD, triple vinyl and as a DVD on 27 May 2016 on the earMUSIC label. The show was recorded live in the Parque de los Pies Descalzos (Barefoot Park) in Medellín, Colombia on 31 August 2013.

== Critical reception ==
Prog magazine called the album "An adept representation of an august body of work." Classic Rock magazine gave the album a rating of two out of five. German Classic Rock gave a rating of seven out of ten.

== Track listing ==
All songs written by Eric Woolfson and Alan Parsons.

1. "I Robot" (Instrumental) – 6:24
2. "Damned If I Do" (Lead vocal P.J. Olsson) – 4:33
3. "Don't Answer Me" (Lead vocal Alan Parsons) – 4:36
4. "Breakdown" (Lead vocal Todd Cooper) - 4:04
5. "The Raven" (Lead vocal Alan Parsons) – 2:51
6. "Time" (Lead vocal P.J. Olsson) – 5:29
7. "I Wouldn't Want to Be Like You" (Lead vocal Alastair Greene) – 4:59
8. "La Sagrada Familia" (Lead vocal Todd Cooper) – 6:04
9. "I. The Turn of a Friendly Card (Part One)" (Lead vocal P.J. Olsson) – 2:53
10. "II. Snake Eyes" (Lead vocal P.J. Olsson) – 3:00
11. "III. The Ace of Swords" (Instrumental) – 2:47
12. "IV. Nothing Left to Lose" (Lead vocal Alan Parsons) – 4:34
13. "V. The Turn of a Friendly Card (Part Two)" (Lead vocal P.J. Olsson) – 4:22
14. "What Goes Up..." (Lead vocal Todd Cooper) – 4:37
15. "Luciferama" (Instrumental) – 5:21
16. "Silence and I" (Lead vocal P.J. Olsson) – 7:46
17. "Prime Time" (Lead vocal Alastair Greene) – 6:34
18. "Intermezzo" (Instrumental) – 1:38
19. "Sirius" (Instrumental) – 2:12
20. "Eye in the Sky" (Lead vocal Alan Parsons) – 5:11
21. "Old and Wise" (Lead vocal P.J. Olsson) – 5:39
22. "Games People Play" (Lead Vocal P.J. Olsson) – 4:54

== Personnel ==
- Alan Parsons – keyboards, guitar, vocals, producer
- P.J. Olsson – vocals, guitar
- Guy Erez – bass, vocals
- Alastair Greene – guitar, vocals
- Todd Cooper – saxophone, guitar, percussion, vocals
- Danny Thompson – drums, vocals
- Andy Kanavan - percussionist
- Tom Brooks – keyboards, vocals
- Alejandro Posada – orchestra and choir conductor
