= Eye 2 Eye: Live in Madrid =

2010 live album by Alan Parsons

Eye 2 Eye: Live In Madrid

Live album by Alan Parsons
- Released: April 6, 2010
- Recorded: May 14, 2004
- Venue: Plaza Mayor, Madrid, Spain
- Genre: Progressive rock, electronic, industrial, futurepop
- Length: 77:51
- Label: Frontiers
- Producer: Alan Parsons

Alan Parsons chronology
A Valid Path (2004)	Eye 2 Eye: Live In Madrid (2010)

Eye 2 Eye: Live in Madrid is a live concert performance by Alan Parsons released on both DVD-Video and Audio CD on April 6, 2010 on the Frontiers label. The show was performed with his band Alan Parsons Live Project, and was recorded live at the Plaza Mayor, Madrid, Spain, on May 14, 2004.

== Critical reception ==
Goldmine magazine gave the album a rating of three stars and wrote: "Newcomers might enjoy indulging in a bit of nostalgia here, but longtime fans likely will prefer the original albums." Rocks said that although the band plays flawlessly, they have an overly sterile sound.

== Track listing ==
All songs written by Eric Woolfson and Alan Parsons, except where noted.

DVD and CD track listing, TRT 80 minutes:

1. "I Robot" – 5:34
2. "Can't Take It With You" – 4:48
3. "Don't Answer Me" – 4:39
4. "Breakdown / The Raven" – 5:44
5. "Time" – 5:24
6. "Psychobabble" – 7:32
7. "I Wouldn't Want to Be Like You" – 3:56
8. "Damned If I Do" – 5:31
9. "More Lost Without You" (Parsons, P. J. Olsson) – 3:25
10. "Don't Let It Show" – 4:25
11. "Prime Time" – 5:58
12. "Sirius / Eye in the Sky" – 7:12
13. "(The System of) Dr. Tarr and Professor Fether" – 4:13
14. "Games People Play" – 5:18

== Personnel ==
- Alan Parsons – acoustic guitar, keyboards and vocals
- P. J. Olsson – acoustic guitar and vocals
- Godfrey Townsend – lead guitar and vocals
- Steve Murphy – drums and vocals
- Manny Focarazzo – keyboards and vocals
- John Montagna – bass guitar and vocals
