= Doug Powell (musician) =

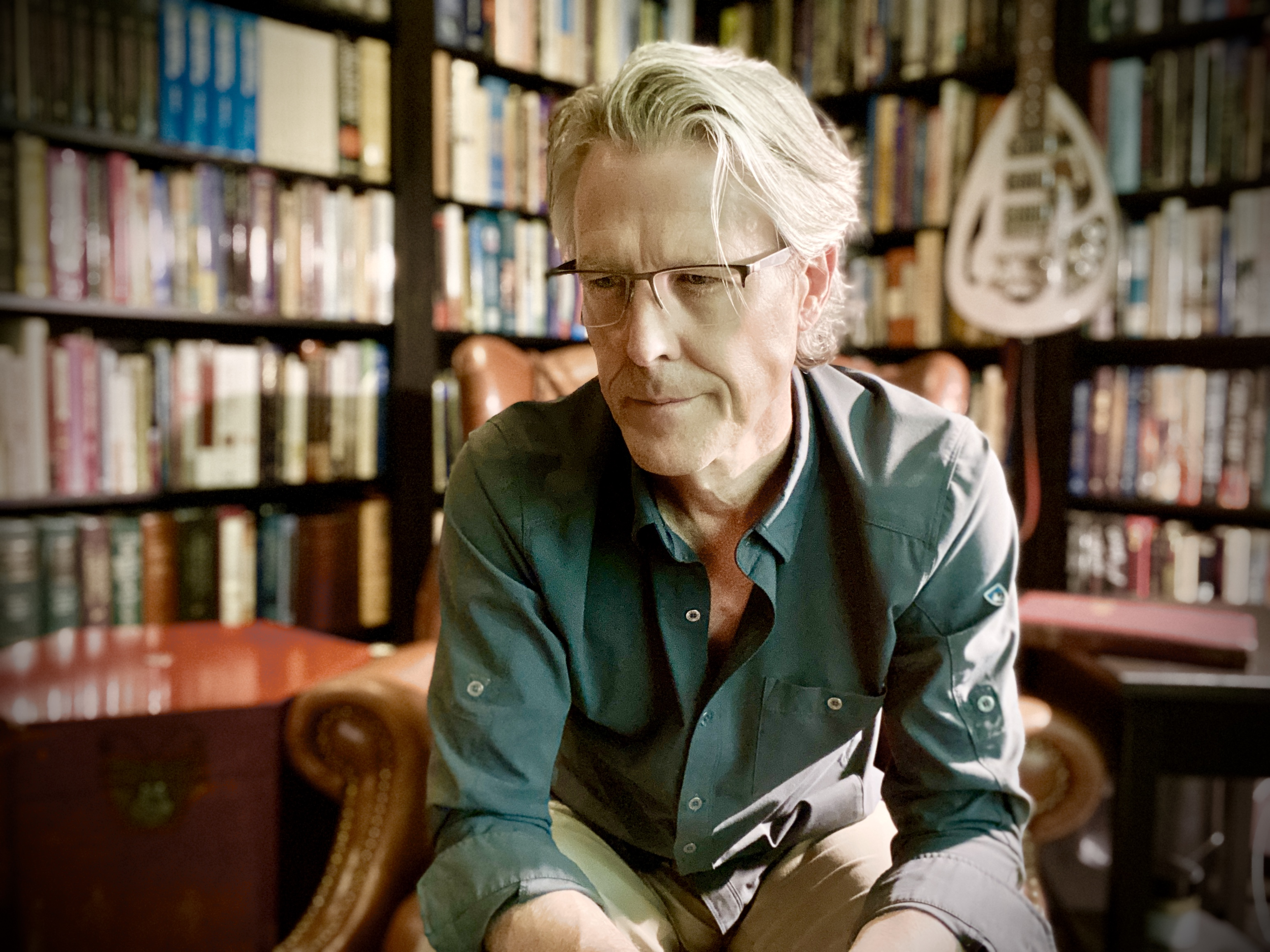
- Doug Powell in 2020

Background information
- Born: October 9, 1965 (age 61); Concord, Massachusetts, United States
- Genres: Power pop, alternative rock, progressive rock
- Instruments: Vocals, guitar, bass, drums, keyboards
- Years active: 1989–present
- Labels: Elektra (1990), RCA (1993–1994), Mercury/Polygram (1995–1996), Not Lame Recordings (1998–2000), Space Baby (2000), Yep Roc (2001), Wizzard in Vinyl (2001), Parasol (2002–2004), Paisley Pop (2006), Muse Sickle (2007–present)
- Website: dougpowell.com

Doug Powell (born Douglas William Powell October 9, 1965, in Concord, Massachusetts) is an American musician, Christian apologist, author, novelist, graphic designer, and programmer.

== Biography ==
=== Music ===
Powell's music career began after giving songwriter Jules Shear a tape of demos in 1989. This led to a contract with Elektra Records and a demo produced by Shear. Elektra nurtured Powell with equipment and vocal coaching, but ultimately passed on making a record. Powell then signed with RCA Records and recorded Ballad of the Tin Men. Powell co-produced with engineer Pete Coleman and played all the instruments except drums, strings, and one guitar solo. After sitting on the shelf for a year, the record was bought by Mercury Records. Mercury immediately arranged for Powell to be the opening act for much of Todd Rundgren's Individualist tour. Just months after Ballad of the Tin Men was released in April 1996, Mercury dropped Powell.

The demos for what was to be the second Mercury record were released under the name Curiouser by Not Lame Recordings in 1999. Powell had been in talks with Rundgren to produce the record. Notable guests include Steve Allen from 20/20 and Tom Petersson from Cheap Trick. In 2000, Powell delivered a new set of songs to Not Lame called More. Powell played all instruments and handled the production, engineering, and graphic design.

During this time Powell was invited by Jerry Dale McFadden (keyboardist for The Mavericks and Sixpence None the Richer to sing backup vocals on a jam session recorded with some other Nashville friends. The group included a revolving membership but centered on McFadden and Robert Reynolds (bassist for the Mavericks). After releasing a 45 rpm single on Diesel Only Records, the band began to play some gigs around Nashville. At that point Powell, McFadden, Reynolds, Ken Coomer (drummer for Wilco), and Tom Petersson started playing under the name Swag. Over the next few years Swag wrote and recorded whenever everyone was in town. Petersson had moved from Nashville, however, and played a lesser role. Brad Jones and Warren Pash took on the main bass duties in the studio and live, respectively. Jones also produced the full-length album Catch-all, released by Yep Roc in 2001. Legal issues caused the first pressing to be recalled and re-released with Todd Rundgren replacing the few parts recorded by Tom Petersson. Swag appeared on Late Night with Conan O'Brien on April 20, 2001. Powell left Swag after suffering a vocal chord injury that required surgery and left him unable to tour. While recuperating in 2001, Japanese label Wizzard in Vinyl released an EP of songs called Venus Di Milo's Arms, featuring darker, more aggressive songs than his previous work.

Powell signed with Parasol Records in 2002 and released The Lost Chord. The CD was a dramatic departure from his previous Power Pop work: it was experimental, progressive, art rock that still placed a heavy emphasis on melody. The record was performed entirely by Powell with the exception of drums on "Baby Blue," which were played by Prairie Prince. Powell continued the stylistic break in 2004 with Day for Night, another one-man-band performance.

In late 2004 Powell was contacted by Elliot Easton, guitarist for The Cars. Easton had heard Powell's recording of Candy-O and was impressed enough to ask Powell to be the singer of The New Cars, a reformation of The Cars without Ric Ocasek and Benjamin Orr (who had died). Powell began working on demos for the project and completed six demos. However, as the plans for the band evolved The Cars decided to bring in a higher profile singer, and settled on Todd Rundgren. Powell released the six demos as well as other leftover songs on Four Seasons, released on the Paisley Pop label. The set included "God Bless Us All," a song written for Ringo Starr's 1999 Christmas album but went unused.

After a hiatus, Powell returned in 2010 with The Apprentice's Sorcerer. The record is a concept album where each song gives a different aspect of the transcendental argument for God's existence while using the terminology of stage magic. The record was another stylistic departure, this time focusing heavily on electronic sounds.

Powell contributed two songs to Alan Parsons 2019 album The Secret. "Requiem" was cowritten with Todd Cooper and Boh Cooper, both of whom were in Powell's band in the mid 90s. Todd Cooper later joined Parsons band as a saxophonist and vocalist. After Parsons reworked "Requiem" for The Secret, Cooper and Powell collaborated again to write "Soirée Fantastique." Parsons wanted the theme of stage magic to unite the songs on the album, so Powell tailored the lyric to fit. Powell and Parsons share a love of magic and are both amateur magicians. The title was taken from the name of the magic show performed by the father of modern magic, Jean Eugene Robert-Houdin. Parsons was taken with the song, and—along with keyboardist Tom Brooks—added a bridge to complete the piece. Powell also contributed background vocals for both songs.

In 2022, Parsons released From the New World, which contained two more songs written by Powell, Parsons, and Todd Cooper. Parsons tapped Tommy Shaw to sing Uroborus. Powell sings the repeating vocals in the round near the end of the song and performed a keyboard part. Fare Thee Well was conceived as a tribute to Eric Woolfson, Parsons's former musical partner. Todd Cooper sings the lead vocal and plays the sax solo. Powell and Cooper share backing vocals, and Powell plays acoustic guitar on the final section.

The book Shake Some Action lists Curiouser and Catch-all as the 97th and 80th greatest Power Pop records ever made.

=== Apologetics ===
In the late 1990s Powell became interested in Christian apologetics. By 2004, he had entered the Masters of apologetics program at Biola University. Powell graduated summa cum laude in 2007. By the end of 2004 he was approached by Broadman & Holman to write a book on apologetics for their QuickSource series. The Holman QuickSource Guide to Apologetics was published in 2006 and has been a bestseller for B&H. In addition to writing the book, Powell did much of the layout. This was followed by invitations to contribute to the Apologetics Study Bible (Broadman & Holman 2007) and the Apologetics Study Bible for Students (2009).

For his next project, Powell combined his apologetics training with his graphic design experience to create the iWitness series. The books and apps in the series are visually immersive and highly interactive. The books feature flaps and elements folded and glued onto the pages that the reader must open. The apps contain the same layouts and information but are programmed to zoom into and open each element. Books in the series include Resurrection iWitness (B&H 2012) and Jesus iWitness (B&H 2012). Apps include Resurrection iWitness (B&H 2011), Jesus iWitness (Selfless Defense 2012), New Testament iWitness (Selfless Defense 2012), iWitness Biblical Archaeology (Selfless Defense 2013), and iWitness World Religions (Selfless Defense 2013). With the exception of Resurrection iWitness, the apps have also been programmed by Doug Powell under the name Selfless Defense.

Powell speaks at conferences and churches on a number of topics including how objective beauty shows God's existence, how Christians have been at the forefront of the arts historically and why they should strive for that again, the transcendental argument for God's existence, the historical evidence for the Resurrection, and biblical archaeology. He is a member of the Evangelical Theological Society and the Evangelical Philosophical Society.

=== Novels ===
The Well of the Soul, an archaeological thriller, was published by White Fire Publishing on October 15, 2021. The novel is the first in a series featuring Ancient Near East scholar Graham Eliot. The opening scene was inspired by a presentation Powell attended where the cartonnage structure of a mummy mask was deconstructed to recover fragments from ancient manuscripts. The mask used in the presentation appears on the cover. From that event, the plot for a treasure hunt developed, a story that takes Graham Eliot around archaeological sites in Jerusalem and eventually beneath the Temple Mount.

Among the Ashes, the second in the series, was published on April 15, 2022. The plot centers around Graham Eliot's secret entry to Saudi Arabia in search of the true location of Mount Sinai.

The Place of Descent followed in October 2022. The story follows Graham Eliot's exploration of Mount Ararat, and the discovery that there is another mountain with a much stronger tradition for being the landing place of Noah's Ark.

The Invisible Thread, released in April 2023, hinges on a secret comparison of the Sudarium of Oviedo with the Shroud of Turin. The book also incorporates Powell's interest magic into the story.

=== Graphic Design ===
Powell received a BFA in Graphic Design in 1987 from the University of Oklahoma. In addition to corporate work, he has designed CDs for himself, Swag, Todd Rundgren, Pal Shazar, Pat Buchanan, Not Lame Recordings, and others. He has also designed books for B&H and Apologia. His experience with computer animation led to programming CD-ROMs, for which Powell won an ADDY in 1997. It then led to website development, Flash programming, and app development. In 1998 Todd Rundgren hired Powell as Creative Director of PatroNet, Rundgren's online subscription service. One of their corroborations, a Flash video for Rundgren's song Yer Fast, was featured in the book Flash Frames. Powell also created the animated backdrop for the song Flamingo for Rundgren's performance of A Wizard, A True Star.

== Discography ==
=== Solo Artist ===
- Ballad of the Tin Men (Mercury, 1996)
- Curiouser (Not Lame, 1999)
- More (Not Lame, 2000)
- Venus De Milo's Arms (Wizard in Vinyl, 2001)
- The Lost Chord (Parasol, 2002)
- Day for Night (Parasol, 2004)
- Four Seasons (Paisley Pop, 2006)
- The Apprentice's Sorcerer (Muse Sickle, 2010)

=== With Swag ===
- Sweet Lucinda (vinyl single, Diesel Only, 1997)
- Different Girls (vinyl picture disc, Space Baby, 2000)
- Catch-all (Yep Roc, 2001)

=== Contributions ===
- Soirée Fantastique (Todd Cooper, Boh Cooper, Doug Powell, Alan Parsons) The Secret by Alan Parsons (Frontiers 2019)
- Requiem (Todd Cooper, Doug Powell, Alan Parsons, Tom Brooks) The Secret by Alan Parsons (Frontiers 2019)
- Fare Thee Well (Todd Cooper, Doug Powell, Alan Parsons) From the New World by Alan Parsons (Frontiers 2022)
- Uroborus (Todd Cooper, Doug Powell, Alan Parsons) From the New World by Alan Parsons (Frontiers 2022)

=== Miscellaneous recordings ===
- Nashpop (Compilation) (Label: NotLame 1998) song title: "Torn"
- Nashpop (Compilation) (Label: NotLame 1998) song title: "Every Day Is Christmas" (performed by Swag)
- Bam Balam Explosion Vol. V (Compilation) (Label: Bam Balam 1998) song title: "Every Little Truth" (performed by Swag)
- Grok This – Defacing the Music of Todd Rundgren (Compilation) (Label: Medicine Park 1998) song title: "Any Way But Love"
- Meet Me on the Other side (Compilation) (Label: Medicine Park 1999) song title: "Shot Like A Bullet Into The Sun"
- Lynne Me Your Ears – A Tribute to the Music of Jeff Lynne (Compilation) (Label: NotLame 2001) song title: "Can't Get It Out Of My Head"
- Lynne Me Your Ears – A Tribute to the Music of Jeff Lynne (Compilation) (Label: NotLame 2001) song title: "Don't Bring Me Down" (performed by Swag)
- Shoe Fetish – A Tribute To Shoes (Compilation) (Label: Parasol 2001) song title: "She Satisfies"
- Six Years of Power Pop (Compilation) (Label: NotLame 2001) song title: "Cul-de-Sac"
- Are You Ready Steve? – A Tribute to Sweet (Compilation) (Label: Bullseye 2002) song title: "Love Is Like Oxygen"
- Right to Chews – Bubblegum Classics Revisited (Compilation) (Label: Not Lame 2002) song title: "I Woke Up In Love This Morning"
- Making God Smile – A Tribute to Brian Wilson (Compilation) (Label: Silent Planet 2002) song title: "Til I Die"
- Every Word – A Tribute to Let's Active (Compilation) (Label: Laughing Outlaw 2003) song title: "Waters Part"
- Substitution Mass Confusion: A Tribute to The Cars (Compilation) (Label: Not Lame 2005) song title: "Candy-O"

== Bibliography ==
=== Author ===
- Holman QuickSource Guide to Christian Apologetics (publisher: Broadman & Holman 2006)
- Resurrection iWitness (publisher: Broadman & Holman 2012; Apologia 2016)
- Jesus iWitness (publisher: Broadman & Holman 2012; Apologia 2016)
- New Testament iWitness (publisher: Apologia 2014)
- Old Testament iWitness (publisher: Apologia 2014)
- iWitness Biblical Archaeology (publisher: Apologia 2014)
- The Jesus Files (publisher: Broadman & Holman 2014)
- iWitness Heresies and Cults (publisher: Apologia 2015)
- iWitness World Religions (publisher: Apologia 2015)
- iWitness Miracles and Prophecy (publisher: Apologia 2015)
- After Easter (co-authored with Jeremy Howard, publisher: B&H 2016)
- After Christmas (co-authored with Jeremy Howard, publisher: B&H 2016)
- The Curious Kid's Guide to Heroes and Villains of the Bible (co-authored with Laura Smith, publisher: Museum of the Bible 2018)
- Big Book of Bible Questions (co-authored with Amy Parker, publisher: Tyndale 2020)
- Tough Questions Answered (publisher: Core Christianity 2021)

=== Contributor ===
- Apologetics Study Bible (publisher: Broadman & Holman 2007)
- Apologetics Study Bible for Students (publisher: Broadman & Holman 2009)
- Study Bible for Kids (publisher: Broadman & Holman 2014)
- I AM Bible (publisher: Broadman & Holman 2016)
- Apologetics Study Bible (publisher: Broadman & Holman 2017)
- Worldview Study Bible (publisher: Broadman & Holman 2018)
- The Word in Motion - Old Testament (publisher: Apologia 2021)
- The Word in Motion - New Testament (publisher: Apologia 2021)

=== Novels ===
- The Well of the Soul (publisher: White Fire 2021)
- Among the Ashes (publisher: White Fire 2022)
- The Place of Descent (publisher: White Fire 2022)
- The Invisible Thread (publisher: White Fire 2023)

=== Apps Written, Designed, and Developed ===
- New Testament iWitness (publisher: Selfless Defense 2012)
- Jesus iWitness (publisher: Selfless Defense 2012)
- iWitness Biblical Archaeology (publisher: Selfless Defense 2013)
- iWitness World Religions (publisher: Selfless Defense 2013)
- iWitness Heresies and Cults (publisher: Selfless Defense 2013)
- Old Testament iWitness (publisher: Selfless Defense 2014)
- iWitness Miracles and Prophecy (publisher: Selfless Defense 2014)

=== Apps Written and Designed ===
- Resurrection iWitness (publisher: Broadman & Holman 2011)
