= Let's Talk About Me (song) =

Single by The Alan Parsons Project

from the album Vulture Culture
- B-side: "Hawkeye"
- Released: 11 January 1985
- Recorded: May–July 1984
- Studio: Abbey Road, London
- Genre: Pop Rock
- Length: 4:29 (Album Version) 3:33 ( 7" Single Version) 3:27 ( US Single Edit) 4:22 (Special Remix)
- Label: Arista
- Songwriters: Eric Woolfson; Alan Parsons
- Producer: Alan Parsons

The Alan Parsons Project singles chronology
| "Prime Time" (1984) | "Let's Talk About Me" (1985) | "Days Are Numbers (The Traveller)" (1985) |

"Let's Talk About Me" is a song by The Alan Parsons Project, the opening track to their 1985 album Vulture Culture. The song was co-written by Eric Woolfson and Alan Parsons and sung by David Paton. It was released as the album's first single and charted in several countries. A music video was created to promote the single, which was directed by Ron Jacobs and produced by Jon Small Productions.

The song was written about the Me generation and features dialogue from Lee Abrams, who was with the band at a London restaurant. Woolfson said that Abrams was "performing his party piece at dinner which consisted of a 10 minute rant on any subject you cared to mention, as well as his apparent skill as an air traffic controller". Abrams' dialogue was captured on a Sony Walkman and parts of it were incorporated into "Let's Talk About Me". Abrams was credited under the anagram Mr Laser Beam in the album's liner notes.

== Release ==
In the United Kingdom, "Let's Talk About Me" was released on 5 January 1985 by Arista Records with "Hawkeye" as the B-side on all editions of the single. The twelve-inch single was also appended with the song "Pipeline". Later that month, the song was added to eleven radio station playlists across the country, including DevonAir, Signal Radio, and Marcher Sound. The band promoted the single in the United Kingdom by appearing on the Sky Channel, where they were interviewed by Peter Powell.

The song also received airplay throughout the rest of continental Europe. On the Stichting Nederlandse Top 40 airplay report, which tabulated airplay from NPO 3FM, "Let's Talk About Me" was ranked ninth on the listing. The song charted on both the Nederlandse Top 40 and Dutch Single Top 100, where it peaked at No. 31 and No. 40 respectively. It was also ranked as the most played song in Spain from Sociedad Española de Radiodifusión. The song peaked at No. 31 on the European Airplay Top 50 chart published by Music & Media.

In the United States, the song was serviced to album oriented rock stations in early 1985 and was one of the most added songs in that format for the week of 1 February 1985 according to Radio & Records. The following week, the song was also added to contemporary hit radio. Billboard listed the song as a national retail breakout in the 16 March 1985 edition of the publication, indicating that it had "significant future sales potential based on initial market reaction." That same month, the song peaked at No. 56 on the Billboard Hot 100 and No. 10 on the Billboard Top Rock Tracks chart.

== Critical reception ==
Reviewing the single for Music Week, Jerry Smith wrote that "Let's Talk About Me" had "big production for a rather dated track with progressive rock overtones" with "heavy guitar domination and Supertramp/Yes style vocals." Billboard also compared the song to the work of Supertramp, saying that it "seems to tips its hat to countryman Roger Hodgson's finest moments. Mike DeGagne of AllMusic felt that the song's "choppy rhythm takes away the attractiveness that could have been."

== Personnel ==
- Ian Bairnson – guitar
- David Paton – bass guitar, lead vocals
- Eric Woolfson – piano
- Richard Cottle – synthesizer
- Stuart Elliott – drums
- Chris Rainbow – backing vocals
- Mr. Laser Beam – oral rendition

== Charts ==
| Chart (1985) | Peak position |
|---|---|
| Canada Top Singles (RPM) | 89 |
| Netherlands (Dutch Top 40) | 31 |
| Netherlands (Single Top 100) | 40 |
| European Hot 100 Singles (Music & Media) | 50 |
| European Airplay (Music & Media) | 31 |
| Spain (AFYVE) | 6 |
| Switzerland (Schweizer Hitparade) | 21 |
| US Billboard Hot 100 | 56 |
| US Mainstream Rock Airplay (Billboard) | 10 |
| West Germany (GfK) | 32 |
