= From the New World (disambiguation) =

From the New World usually refers to Symphony No. 9 (Dvořák), an 1893 symphony composed by Antonín Dvořák.

From the New World may also refer to:

- Shadow Hearts: From the New World, a 2005 role-playing game
- From the New World (novel), a 2008 novel by Yusuke Kishi
- From the New World (album), a 2022 album by Alan Parsons

== See also ==
- Into the New World (disambiguation)
