= 101 Damnations =

101 Damnations may refer to:

- "101 Dam-Nations", a 1982 single by Scarlet Party
- 101 Damnations (album), 1989, by Carter the Unstoppable Sex Machine

== See also ==
- 101 Dalmatians (disambiguation)
