= The Instrumental Works =

Compilation album by The Alan Parsons Project
- Released: 7 November 1988
- Genre: Progressive rock Electronic
- Label: Arista
- Producer: Alan Parsons; Eric Woolfson

The Alan Parsons Project chronology
The Best of the Alan Parsons Project, Vol. 2 (1988)	The Instrumental Works (1988)	Freudiana (1990)

The Instrumental Works is a 1988 compilation album by the Alan Parsons Project, featuring many of the band's instrumental tracks.

== Tracks ==
All tracks are written by Alan Parsons and Eric Woolfson.

No.	Title	Album	Length
1.	"Pipeline"	Ammonia Avenue	3:56
2.	"Where's the Walrus?"	Stereotomy	7:23
3.	"I Robot"	I Robot	5:59
4.	"Mammagamma"	Eye in the Sky	3:32
5.	"Hawkeye"	Vulture Culture	3:44
6.	"Voyager"	Pyramid	2:14
7.	"Paseo de Gracia"	Gaudi	3:44
8.	"Urbania"	Stereotomy	4:57
9.	"The Gold Bug"	The Turn of a Friendly Card	4:27
10.	"Genesis Ch.1 V.32"	I Robot	3:37

== Credits ==
- Art direction, design – Holland Macdonald
- Executive producer – Eric Woolfson
- Mastered by Ted Jensen
- Photography by Michel Tcherevkoff
- Producer, engineer – Alan Parsons
