= Days Are Numbers (The Traveller) =

Single by The Alan Parsons Project

from the album Vulture Culture
- B-side: "Somebody Out There"
- Released: 1985
- Recorded: May–July 1984
- Studio: Abbey Road Studios, London
- Length: 4:52 (album version); 3:54 (single edit)
- Label: Arista
- Songwriters: Eric Woolfson, Alan Parsons
- Producer: Alan Parsons

The Alan Parsons Project singles chronology
"Let's Talk About Me" (1985)	"Days Are Numbers (The Traveller)" (1985)	"Vulture Culture" (1985)

"Days Are Numbers (The Traveller)" is a song by The Alan Parsons Project, the third track on their 1985 album Vulture Culture. The song was co-written by Eric Woolfson and Alan Parsons and sung by Chris Rainbow. It was released as the album's second single and charted in the United States, where it peaked at No. 71 on the Billboard Hot 100. The song also reached No. 11 and No. 30 respectively on the Billboard Adult Contemporary chart and Top Rock Tracks chart.

== Background ==
In a Q&A hosted by Gearspace, Parsons commented that "Days Are Numbers (The Traveller)" was a "genuine co-write" when asked about his collaborative efforts with Woolfson, saying that other songs in the band's discography other than the instrumental compositions were largely written by Woolfson.

During the week of 12 April 1985, "Days Are Numbers (The Traveller)" was the most added song to adult contemporary radio stations according to Radio & Records. Two weeks later, 64 percent of adult contemporary radio stations reporting to Radio & Records had "Days Are Numbers (The Traveller)" on their playlist.

According to Parsons, there was some discussion over whether to release "Days are Numbers (The Traveller)" as the first or second single from Vulture Culture, as he mentioned in an interview published in the 3 May 1985 edition of the Gavin Report.

I think everybody knew "Days Are Numbers" was going to be one of those singles ... It was a tough decision to make, whether or not to release "Let's Talk About Me" first and then follow it up with "Days Are Numbers," or to put "Days Are Numbers" out first I think everybody, including myself, feels "Days Are Numbers" has a better shot as a single.

== Critical reception ==
Billboard thought that "Days Are Numbers (The Traveller)" possessed "dreamy imagery" that was "shrouded in soft-focus harmony". Mike DeGagne AllMusic labelled "Days Are Numbers (The Traveller)" as "the most appealing song" on the album, writing that it "combines simplicity with a timeless chorus, making for a truly beautiful ballad."

== Personnel ==
- Chris Rainbow – vocals
- Ian Bairnson – guitar
- David Paton – bass guitar
- Alan Parsons – keyboards
- Eric Woolfson – keyboards
- Richard Cottle – keyboards, saxophone
- Stuart Elliott – drums, percussion

== Charts ==
Chart (1985)	Peak position
US Billboard Hot 100	72
US Adult Contemporary (Billboard)	10
US Mainstream Rock (Billboard)	30
