= Parsons code =

Notation used to identify a piece of music

Parsons Code of Ode to Joy

* R U U R D D D D R U U R D R

      *-*                    
     /   \                  
    *     *                  
   /       \                
*-*         *         *-*    
             \       /   \  
              *     *     *-*
               \   /        
                *-*

The Parsons code, formally named the Parsons code for melodic contours, is a simple notation method used to identify a piece of music through melodic motion – movements of the pitch up, down or static.

== The code ==
The first note of a melody is denoted with an asterisk (*), although some Parsons code users omit the first note. All succeeding notes are denoted with one of three letters to indicate the relationship of its pitch to the previous note:

- * = first tone as reference,
- u = "up", for when the note is higher than the previous note,
- d = "down", for when the note is lower than the previous note,
- r = "repeat", for when the note has the same pitch as the previous note.

== Directory of Tunes and Musical Themes ==
Denys Parsons (father of Alan Parsons) developed the system for his 1975 book The Directory of Tunes and Musical Themes. Representing a melody in this manner makes it easier to index or search for pieces, particularly when the notes' values are unknown. Parsons covered around 15,000 classical, popular and folk pieces in his dictionary. In the process he found out that *UU is the most popular opening contour, used in 23% of all the themes, something that applies to all the genres.

An earlier, alternative method of classifying and indexing melody was devised by Harold Barlow and Sam Morgenstern in A Dictionary of Musical Themes (1950).

The Directory of Tunes and Musical Themes was also published in Germany in 2002 and reissued by Piatkus in 2008 as the Directory of Classical Themes.

=== Editions ===
- Parsons, Denys (1975). The Directory of Tunes and Musical Themes. S. Brown. ISBN 0-904747-00-X.
- Parsons, Denys (2002). The Directory of Tunes and Musical Themes. Bohmeier. ISBN 3-89094-370-5.
- Parsons, Denys (2008). The Directory of Classical Themes. Piatkus. ISBN 978-0-7499-5178-8.

== Examples ==
Twinkle Twinkle Little Star
Tune for Twinkle Twinkle Little Star

- "Twinkle Twinkle Little Star": *rururddrdrdrdurdrdrdurdrdrddrururddrdrdrd
- "Silent Night": *udduuddurdurdurudddudduruddduddurudduuddduddd
- "Aura Lea" ("Love Me Tender"): *uduududdduu
- "White Christmas": *udduuuu
- First verse in Madonna's "Like a Virgin": *rrurddrdrrurdudurrrrddrduuddrdu

== See also ==
- A Dictionary of Musical Themes
- List of music software
