= On Air (Alan Parsons album) =

1996 studio album

Studio album by Alan Parsons
- Released: 24 September 1996
- Recorded: December 1995 – June 1996
- Genre: Progressive rock
- Length: 49:36
- Label: River North
- Producer: Alan Parsons

Alan Parsons chronology
Try Anything Once (1993)	On Air (1996)	The Time Machine (1999)

Singles from On Air
- 1. "Brother Up in Heaven" Released: 1996 (Europe only); 2. "So Far Away" Released: 1996 (Sweden only); 3. "Fall Free" Released: 1997 (Europe only); 4. "Apollo" Released: 1997 (US only)

Professional ratings
Review scores
Source	Rating
AllMusic	3/5 stars

On Air is the second solo studio album by English rock musician Alan Parsons. The album's chief creative force was the Alan Parsons Project's long-time guitarist, Ian Bairnson. Its concept revolves around the history of airborne exploration.

Musically, this album is somewhat different from Try Anything Once and the Alan Parsons Project albums, opting for more of a soft rock sound and a more stable band line-up rather than the funky rhythms, symphonic flares, or rotating vocalists of the past.

== Concept ==
The album follows the history of airborne exploration, from the mythological flight of Daedalus and Icarus to escape the labyrinth of the Minotaur in "Too Close to the Sun", through Leonardo da Vinci's search to design a flying machine, or ornithopter, in long-time Project drummer Stuart Elliott's "One Day To Fly", until finally mankind's aspirations for space exploration placed on the shoulders of a single astronaut in "So Far Away" and the subsequent superpower race to put a man on the moon in "Apollo", a track backed by John F. Kennedy's famous speech of 25 May 1961.

The song "Brother Up in Heaven" remembers Ian Bairnson's cousin Erik Mounsey who was killed in a friendly fire incident above Iraq in 1994. "Fall Free" is inspired by skysurfer Rob Harris, who died in 1995. "So Far Away" also references the Challenger tragedy in 1986 in its last verse.

== Release ==
On Air was issued as both a stereo CD and a 5.1 channel dts mix. Included with the music CD was a CD-ROM exploring the On Air theme.

== Track listing ==
No.	Title	Writer(s)	Lead vocalist	Length
1.	"Blue Blue Sky"	Ian Bairnson	Eric Stewart	1:38
2.	"Too Close to the Sun"	Alan Parsons, Bairnson, Stuart Elliott	Neil Lockwood	5:04
3.	"Blown by the Wind"	Bairnson	Eric Stewart	5:25
4.	"Cloudbreak"	Bairnson, Parsons, Elliott	none	4:39
5.	"I Can't Look Down"	Bairnson	Neil Lockwood	4:37
6.	"Brother Up in Heaven"	Bairnson	Neil Lockwood	4:02
7.	"Fall Free"	Bairnson, Elliott, Parsons	Steve Overland	4:21
8.	"Apollo"	Elliott, Parsons, Bairnson	none (spoken words by John F. Kennedy)	6:06
9.	"So Far Away"	Bairnson	Christopher Cross	4:07
10.	"One Day to Fly"	Elliott, Scott English	Graham Dye	6:16
11.	"Blue Blue Sky"	Bairnson	Eric Stewart	4:24

Bonus track on Japanese release
No.	Title	Writer(s)	Length
12.	"Apollo Ambient Mix (Moon Boots)" (Remix by Solar Quest)	Elliott, Parsons, Bairnson	7:59

Several additional remixes of "Apollo" were released on 12" singles.

== Personnel ==
- Alan Parsons – keyboards (tracks 2, 4, 8), mixing, engineering
- Andrew Powell – orchestral arranger and conductor
- Ian Bairnson – guitars, bass synthesizer (4), bass guitar (6)
- John Giblin – bass guitar
- Stuart Elliott – drums, bongos (11), keyboards and drum programming (8)
- Richard Cottle – saxophone (2), keyboards (2, 5, 7, 8)
- Gary Sanctuary – keyboards
- Christopher Warren-Green – orchestra leader
- Eric Stewart – lead vocals (tracks 1, 3, 11)
- Neil Lockwood – lead vocals (tracks 2, 5, 6)
- Steve Overland – lead vocals (track 7)
- Christopher Cross – lead vocals (track 9)
- Graham Dye – lead vocals (track 10)
- Peter Beckett – backing vocals (track 6)
- Storm Thorgerson – cover design
- Alan Parsons/Adrian van Velsen – Mastering Engineer

== Charts ==
Chart performance for On Air
Chart (1996)	Peak position
Dutch Albums (Album Top 100)	22
German Albums (Offizielle Top 100)	61
Swedish Albums (Sverigetopplistan)	54
