= The Time Machine (Alan Parsons album) =

1999 studio album

Studio album by Alan Parsons
- Released: September 1999
- Genre: Progressive rock
- Length: 51:50
- Label: Miramar
- Producer: Alan Parsons

Alan Parsons chronology
On Air (1996)	The Time Machine (1999)	A Valid Path (2004)

Singles from The Time Machine
- 1. "Out of the Blue" Released: September 1999 (Germany and Spain only); 2. "The Very Last Time" Released: 1999 (Europe only); 3. "The Time Machine" Released: 2000 (Europe only)

Professional ratings
Review scores
Source	Rating
AllMusic	4/5 stars

The Time Machine is the third solo album attributed to English rock musician Alan Parsons.

While the sound of this album is similar to some of the soft, ethereal tracks by the Alan Parsons Project, none of the writing or performance credits in the sleeve notes go to Alan Parsons, except for one short and simple organ pad on "Temporalia" (all other tracks were written by drummer Stuart Elliott and guitarist Ian Bairnson), additional organ performance on "No Future in the Past" (written by drummer Stuart Eliott), and the Japanese bonus track "Beginnings" (which also features his voice as spoken word). All other tracks were written by Elliott or guitarist Ian Bairnson. Parsons' relation to the album is therefore almost exclusively as producer and studio engineer.

== Concept ==
The themes of time, time travel, and memory of the past had been suggested by Parsons as subject matter for the second Alan Parsons Project album, but writing partner Eric Woolfson favoured a purely futuristic theme of robotic beings eventually displacing the human race, which eventually resulted in the album I Robot.

"Temporalia" features a narration by professor Frank Close on the idea of the universe itself acting as a sort of time machine; this is an extract of "Equinox – The Rubber Universe" (a film directed by Storm Thorgerson and with background music by Parsons). "Press Rewind" ponders what a person might do if they were able to reverse time, and change decisions they had made. "Out of the Blue" relates to a time traveller from the future. "Call Up" is about great people from history and, according to Ian Bairnson, "the effect they would have on the World right now, if they were here". "Ignorance Is Bliss" talks about how sad people are in comparison to ancient and simpler times, and the possibility of change for good to a simple way of life. "Rubber Universe" is named after the aforementioned film about the expansion of the universe and the search for the Hubble constant.

"The Call of the Wild" talks about a future when mankind will be one without any separation (ethnicities, faith, nations, etc.). The melody of this song is a variation of the traditional Irish folk song "She Moves Through the Fair". "No Future in the Past" talks about avoiding repeating past mistakes. "The Very Last Time" is a song about people that have gone and never been seen again. The song was written about Bairnson's recently deceased dog, Gemma. "Far Ago and Long Away" is a play on words, as in relativity space = time, so "far away" = "far ago" and "long ago" = "long away".

The album cover has several images related to time and popular time-travel icons, including a photography camera, a clock mechanism, a police box as a reference to the TARDIS in Doctor Who, a wormhole-like tunnel effect from the opening sequence, a DeLorean sports car referring to the Back to the Future series, and a child playing with a model ship from the Star Trek franchise.

== Video promo ==
The video promo of "The Time Machine" was completely made (3D modeling, animation and rendering) by Ben Liebrand and was released on 1 September 1999. It includes two designs created by Storm Thorgerson (Hipgnosis UK) and translated by Liebrand into a 3D composition. He made everything in four weeks using Softimage 3D Extreme.

== Track listing ==
All tracks are written by Ian Bairnson, except where noted.

No.	Title	Writer(s)	Lead vocals	Length
1.	"The Time Machine (Part 1)"	Stuart Elliott		4:54
2.	"Temporalia"	Alan Parsons	Instrumental, narrated by Professor Frank Close	1:00
3.	"Out of the Blue"		Tony Hadley	4:54
4.	"Call Up"		Neil Lockwood	5:13
5.	"Ignorance Is Bliss"		Colin Blunstone	6:45
6.	"Rubber Universe"			3:52
7.	"The Call of the Wild"		Máire Brennan	5:22
8.	"No Future in the Past"	Elliott	Lockwood	4:46
9.	"Press Rewind"	Elliott	Graham Dye	4:20
10.	"The Very Last Time"		Beverley Craven	3:42
11.	"Far Ago and Long Away"			5:14
12.	"The Time Machine (Part 2)"	Elliott		1:47

International bonus track
No.	Title	Writer(s)	Lead vocals	Length
13.	"Dr. Evil" (Edit)	Elliott	Mike Myers	3:23

Japanese bonus track
No.	Title	Writer(s)	Lead vocals	Length
13.	"Beginnings"	Elliott; Parsons	Instrumental, narrated by Parsons	4:31

== Personnel ==
- Alan Parsons – keyboards, organ, composer, engineer, producer, narration on "Beginnings"
- Ian Bairnson – guitars, mandolin, bass, keyboards, saxophone, backing vocals, composer
- Stuart Elliott – drums, drum programming, percussion, keyboards, keyboard programming, orchestral arrangement, composer
- Richard Cottle – keyboards, additional keyboards
- Robyn Smith – keyboards, piano
- John Giblin – bass guitar
- Kathryn Tickell – bagpipes, Northumbrian pipes on "The Call of the Wild"
- Julian Sutton – melodeon on "The Call of the Wild"
- Claire Orsler – viola on "The Very Last Time"
- Jackie Norrie, Julia Singleton – violin on "The Very Last Time"
- The Philharmonia Orchestra – strings, brass, horns
- Clio Gould – orchestra leader
- Andrew Powell – orchestral arrangement and conductor
- Tony Hadley, Neil Lockwood, Colin Blunstone, Moya Brennan, Beverley Craven, Graham Dye, Chris Rainbow – lead vocals
- Chris Rainbow, Stuart Elliott – backing vocals
- Frank Close – narration on "Temporalia"

== Charts ==
Chart performance for The Time Machine
Chart (1999)	Peak position
Dutch Albums (Album Top 100)	27
German Albums (Offizielle Top 100)	98

Chart (2021)	Peak position
German Albums (Offizielle Top 100)	29
