= Alastair Greene =

American blues rock singer, guitarist, and songwriter (born 1971)

- Born: Alastair L. Greene; April 18, 1971 (age 54); Santa Barbara, California, United States
- Genres: Blues rock
- Occupation(s): Singer, guitarist, songwriter
- Instrument(s): Vocals, guitar
- Years active: Mid 1990s–present
- Labels: Various
- Website: https://agsongs.com/home

Alastair L. Greene (born April 18, 1971) is an American blues rock singer, guitarist, and songwriter. His debut album, A Little Wiser was released in 2001, the first of nine under his name over the next 20 years. Greene's guest appearances include those with Eric Burdon, Walter Trout, Coco Montoya, Savoy Brown, John Németh and Debbie Davies. He has also performed and/or recorded with Alan Parsons, Starship featuring Mickey Thomas, and Sugaray Rayford.

== Life and career ==
He was born in Santa Barbara, California, United States, and grew up intrigued by a combination of his mother's piano playing, plus the diverse record collection owned by both of his parents. However, it was his grandfather, Alfred "Chico" Alvarez, once of Stan Kenton's band in the 1940s and 1950s, who inspired Greene to pursue a musical career. In his youth, Greene took piano and saxophone lessons, but found that learning to play the guitar allowed him to partly emulate the type of heavy rock music he was listening to at the time, and to play with other like-minded students. His path towards the blues was assisted by his father's friend, who loaned Greene a few seminal blues recordings including B.B. King's Live at the Regal, Buddy Guy's A Man and the Blues, Johnny Winter's Second Winter, The Allman Brothers Band's At Fillmore East and Stevie Ray Vaughan's Couldn't Stand the Weather. He formed a band and, a year later, relocated trying to obtain openings for their hard rock ensemble in the clubs in Hollywood, Los Angeles. Meanwhile, Greene also played in a high school jazz band who undertook a competition in Walt Disney World, in Orlando, Florida. He impressed a college representative sufficiently to obtain a scholarship at the Berklee College of Music. After a year studying at Santa Barbara City College, Greene was a pupil for two years at Berklee, although he did not graduate. Again through his father's connections he managed to join a blues rock outfit, and then another one, where he took up singing as well as playing the guitar.

By 1997, Greene compiled a band under his own name who opened for the Fabulous Thunderbirds, John Mayall, Lonnie Brooks, and Robin Trower. Work was sporadic and Greene had to obtain various day jobs to stay solvent. The experiences led Greene to recording his self-released debut album, A Little Wiser, which was issued in 2001. The collection comprised mainly Greene's own compositions, but included his versions of the Muddy Waters song "Ramblin' Mind" and Albert King's "Love Too Strong". A review for A Little Wiser stated that "Greene displays a monstrous ability for full-on blues-rock anthems. While some blues purists will no doubt chafe at his distorted Gibson bombast, those who prefer their blues amped up should be deafeningly pleased". Greene followed this with a live album, before a chance encounter led him to meet Alan Parsons, who invited Greene to play on the album, A Valid Path (2004). In 2009, when Parson's then guitarist, Godfrey Townsend, had scheduling conflicts, Greene played in Parson's band on a tour of the West Coast, and the following year Greene became a full-time band member. After a European tour with Parsons, Greene accepted an invite to fill in with Starship featuring Mickey Thomas for several live commitments. The second concert Greene undertook with them was opening for Lynyrd Skynyrd in Florida.

After a couple more self-released albums, Greene recorded Trouble At Your Door in 2014 for Eclecto Groove Records. Erik Norlander played Hammond organ on the recording. Greene's commitments to the Alan Parsons Live Project lasted until 2017. An August 2013 concert performance in Medellín, Colombia, was released as the live album, Alan Parsons Symphonic Project, Live in Colombia, where Greene both played guitar throughout and sang on some of the tracks.

Free of other assignments, Greene signed to Rip Cat Records and released the studio album, Dream Train, in 2017. It gained a four star review and nomination for 'Best Album of the Year' in DownBeat magazine; It was mixed and produced by David Z. The only track Greene did not write of the 13 therein was the Billy Gibbons-penned "Nome Zayne". To celebrate the 20th anniversary of forming his own band, Greene recorded Live From the 805 (2018) in front of a loyal sold-out crowd in Santa Barbara. It was nominated for 'Rock Blues Album of the Year' by Blues Blast magazine.

In 2019, Greene joined Sugaray Rayford's band as a touring band member, which lasted for around one year. Greene's latest album was recorded for Tab Benoit's Whiskey Bayou Records, having signed a recording contract with the label in 2019. The New World Blues saw Greene travel to Houma, Louisiana, and record with Benoit playing drums and Corey Duplechin on bass guitar. The collection was co-arranged and co-produced with Benoit and consisted of 11 original songs. The album was released on October 23, 2020. Greene stated "This is definitely the most stripped down blues-based album I’ve ever made. The vast majority of this record is live in the studio with very few overdubs and many were first or second takes". During the COVID-19 pandemic in the United States, Greene undertook a series of podcasts called "Throwdown Thursdays".

== Discography ==
=== Albums ===
Year	Title	Record label	Additional credits
2001	A Little Wiser	Riatsala Music	
2003	Official Bootleg: Live in L.A.	Riatsala Music	Alastair Greene Band
2009	Walking in Circles	Riatsala Music	Alastair Greene Band
2011	Through the Rain	Leroi Records	
2014	Trouble At Your Door	Eclecto Groove Records	Alastair Greene Band
2016	Now and Again	Self-released	Alastair Greene Band
2017	Dream Train	Rip Cat Records	
2018	Live From the 805	Rip Cat Records	
2020	The New World Blues	Whiskey Bayou Records	
2023	Alive in the New World	Whiskey Bayou Records	
