= The Sicilian Defence (album) =

Studio album by the Alan Parsons Project
- Released: 23 March 2014
- Recorded: 1979
- Genres: Progressive rock; classical; electronic
- Length: 39:52
- Label: Arista
- Producers: Alan Parsons; Eric Woolfson

The Alan Parsons Project chronology
Gaudi (1987)	The Sicilian Defence (2014)

Eric Woolfson and Alan Parsons albums chronology
Freudiana (1990)	The Sicilian Defence (2014)

The Sicilian Defence is the eleventh and final studio album by the Alan Parsons Project, released in 2014. It was named after the Sicilian Defence, a famous chess opening. Having been released 24 years after the split of the band, it has so far only been available as part of the eleven-CD box set The Complete Albums Collection (which omits the original mix of Tales of Mystery and Imagination and all bonus tracks from previous expanded reissues). In December 2023, it was made available for download purchase and on streaming sites. The album is the Project's official eleventh album instead of Freudiana, as the Project would split during its production, but feature most of the Project's personnel, making it the "unofficial" Project album.

Originally recorded in 1979, it was never actually intended for release, but was sent to the band's label, Arista, as a sort of "chess move" as they did not feel they were given adequate time to make a new album while Eric Woolfson negotiated their contract, but were under obligation to deliver one anyway. As such, this album consists of incomplete sketches that were never fleshed out into proper songs, and whose titles describe the Classical Variation of the chess opening in descriptive notation (Note: For instance, the first track is named "P-K4". In chess, this means that white opens the game by moving the pawn in front of the king forward two spaces; this is equivalent to "e4" in algebraic notation. The Sicilian Defence consists of black responding with the move "P-QB4" ("c5" in algebraic notation)). "P-QB4" was the first track to be released from the album, when a shortened version of it entitled "Elsie's Theme" was included on the 2008 remastered edition of Eve. It is thus the only track to be given a formal title unrelated to a chess move.

== Quotes ==
The Sicilian Defence was our attempt at quickly fulfilling our contractual obligation after I Robot, Pyramid, and Eve had been delivered. The album was rejected by Arista, not surprisingly, and we then renegotiated our deal for the future and the next album, The Turn of a Friendly Card. The Sicilian Defence album was never released and never will be, if I have anything to do with it. I have not heard it since it was finished. I hope the tapes no longer exist.

— Alan Parsons, 2005

It was made almost as a throwaway, contractual obligation album. It was made very quickly. We delivered Eve and The Sicilian Defence simultaneously and told the label “There are your last two albums. Now, give us a new deal.” [laughs] There were all kinds of politics that went on at the time. The Sicilian Defence is very instrumental. I don’t think there’s a single vocal on it. We’ve been pretty protective of it. I haven’t even possessed a copy of it since 1979 when it was made. Don’t hold your breath on this one. It’s interesting, but not the greatest piece of work.

— Alan Parsons, 2013

I'm happy that it's fulfilling a need to document, historically, the entire catalog of the Alan Parsons project, but it's not our finest hour by any stretch of the imagination. It was an album made under pressure. It doesn't have the polish or finesse that all the albums that were released previously had. It's really not up to the standard of the real Project albums. We just wanted to get it done. It was made in a hurry. It took three days, and that was a very small amount of time compared with the sometimes three or four months we might have spent making a proper album. 'The Sicilian Defense' is the title of a tactical move in the game of chess, but there was a real game of tactics going on in a very real sense with Eric and the label. Like I said, it's an interesting piece of history.

— Alan Parsons, 2016

== Track listing ==
Position: a8 black rook, c8 black bishop, d8 black queen, e8 black king, f8 black bishop, h8 black rook, a7 black pawn, b7 black pawn, e7 black pawn, f7 black pawn, g7 black pawn, h7 black pawn, c6 black knight, d6 black pawn, f6 black knight, d4 white knight, e4 white pawn, c3 white knight, a2 white pawn, b2 white pawn, c2 white pawn, f2 white pawn, g2 white pawn, h2 white pawn, a1 white rook, c1 white bishop, d1 white queen, e1 white king, f1 white bishop, h1 white rook

The position reached in a chess game that follows the song titles in order

All songs composed by Eric Woolfson. All tracks are instrumental.

Side one
No.	Title	Length
1.	"P-K4"	5:00
2.	"P-QB4"	6:22
3.	"Kt-KB3"	3:07
4.	"...Kt-QB3"	1:15
5.	"P-Q4"	3:54

Side two
No.	Title	Length
6.	"PxP"	3:27
7.	"KtxP"	4:01
8.	"Kt-B3"	0:53
9.	"Kt-QB3"	8:16
10.	"P-Q3"	3:30
Total length:		39:45
