= From the New World (album) =

Studio album by Alan Parsons
- Released: 15 July 2022
- Recorded: 2021–2022
- Genre: Progressive rock
- Length: 45:34
- Label: Frontiers
- Producer: Alan Parsons

Alan Parsons chronology
The Secret (2019)	From the New World (2022)

Singles from From the New World
- 1. "Uroboros" Released: May 2022; 2. "I Won't Be Led Astray" Released: June 2022; 3. "Give 'Em My Love" Released: July 2022

From the New World is the sixth solo studio album by English rock musician Alan Parsons. It was released on 15 July 2022 via Frontiers Music Srl. The album features a number of notable guest appearances, including guitarist Joe Bonamassa, Tommy Shaw of Styx, and vocalist David Pack (formerly of Ambrosia). The album received mixed to positive reviews from critics.

Professional ratings
Review scores
Source	Rating
Ultimate Classic Rock	Positive
Prog Archives	2.44/5 (C− rating)
Sea of Tranquility	4/5
Spill Magazine	9/10

== Track listing ==
No.	Title	Lead vocalist	Length
1.	"Fare Thee Well"	Todd Cooper	4:36
2.	"The Secret"	Alan Parsons	4:18
3.	"Uroboros" (featuring Tommy Shaw of Styx)	Tommy Shaw	4:09
4.	"Don't Fade Now"	P.J. Olsson	4:16
5.	"Give 'Em My Love" (featuring James Durbin, Joe Bonamassa)	James Durbin	3:22
6.	"Obstacles"	Todd Cooper	3:38
7.	"I Won't Be Led Astray" (featuring David Pack, Joe Bonamassa)	David Pack	4:41
8.	"You Are the Light"	Mark Mikel	4:27
9.	"Halos"	Dan Tracey	4:18
10.	"Goin' Home"	Alan Parsons	4:57
11.	"Be My Baby" (The Ronettes cover, featuring Tabitha Fair)	Tabitha Fair	2:52
Total length:			45:34

== Personnel ==
- Lead vocals: Alan Parsons, Tommy Shaw, David Pack, James Durbin, P. J. Olsson, Todd Cooper, Dan Tracey, Mark Mikel, Tabitha Fair
- Guitars: Alan Parsons, Jeff Kollman, Dan Tracey, Doug Powell, Jeff Marshall, James Durbin, Tim Pierce, Joe Bonamassa (solos on "Give 'Em My Love" and "I Won't Be Led Astray")
- Bass: Guy Erez
- Drums: Danny Thompson
- Keyboards: Tom Brooks, Doug Powell, Matt McCarrin, Kim Bullard
- Saxophone: Todd Cooper
- Cello: Mika Larson (on "I Won't Be Led Astray")
- Producer: Alan Parsons

== Charts ==
Chart (2022)	Peak position
German Albums (Offizielle Top 100)	7
Swiss Albums (Schweizer Hitparade)	8
