= Gil Assayas =

Israeli composer, keyboardist, producer, and vocalist

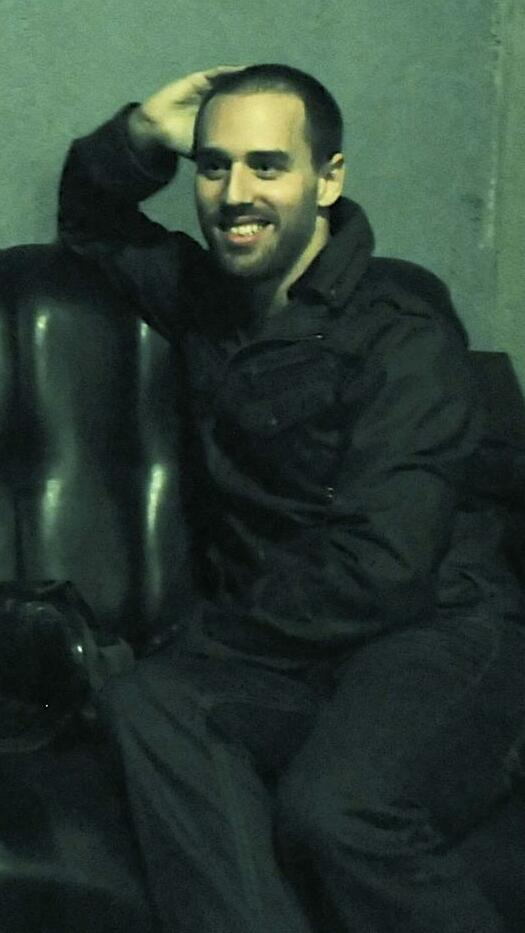

Gil Assayas (Hebrew: גיל אסייס; also known as GLASYS) is an Israeli-American composer, keyboardist, producer, and vocalist. Previously, he was the keyboardist and one of the lead vocalists of the band missFlag. He currently resides in Portland, Oregon.

Assayas released the first GLASYS EP, The Pressure, in 2016. In 2019, he funded the production of a full-length GLASYS album using Kickstarter, to be delivered mid-year. In 2023, Assayas released a Chiptune album inspired by the video games of his childhood. In 2025, he released an EP titled Never Present Nor at Ease. Assayas has also released numerous singles and compilation albums that include arrangements of themes from video games as well as synth arrangements of Frédéric Chopin Preludes.

Assayas has published hundreds of videos through his GLASYS YouTube channel, often focusing on a unique left hand technique that allows him to play bass and percussion simultaneously using a custom built MIDI controller. Since 2021, Assayas has also been creating live MIDI Art compositions that earned him a MIDI Innovation Award from The MIDI Foundation. In 2025, GLASYS self published a book of sheet music containing 50 of his MIDI Art compositions.

In 2018, Assayas toured as the keyboardist of Todd Rundgren's band Utopia after the originally-announced keyboardist, Ralph Schuckett, bowed out. He appears in the 2019 live video release from that tour. Since then, Assayas has been touring with Rundgren as his keyboardist.

In July 2019, Assayas released the single "People" featuring Todd Rundgren as a guest artist.

Assayas has also collaborated with T-Pain after one of his videos caught the rapper's attention on Reddit.
