= MissFlag =

Indie pop-rock band from Jerusalem

missFlag
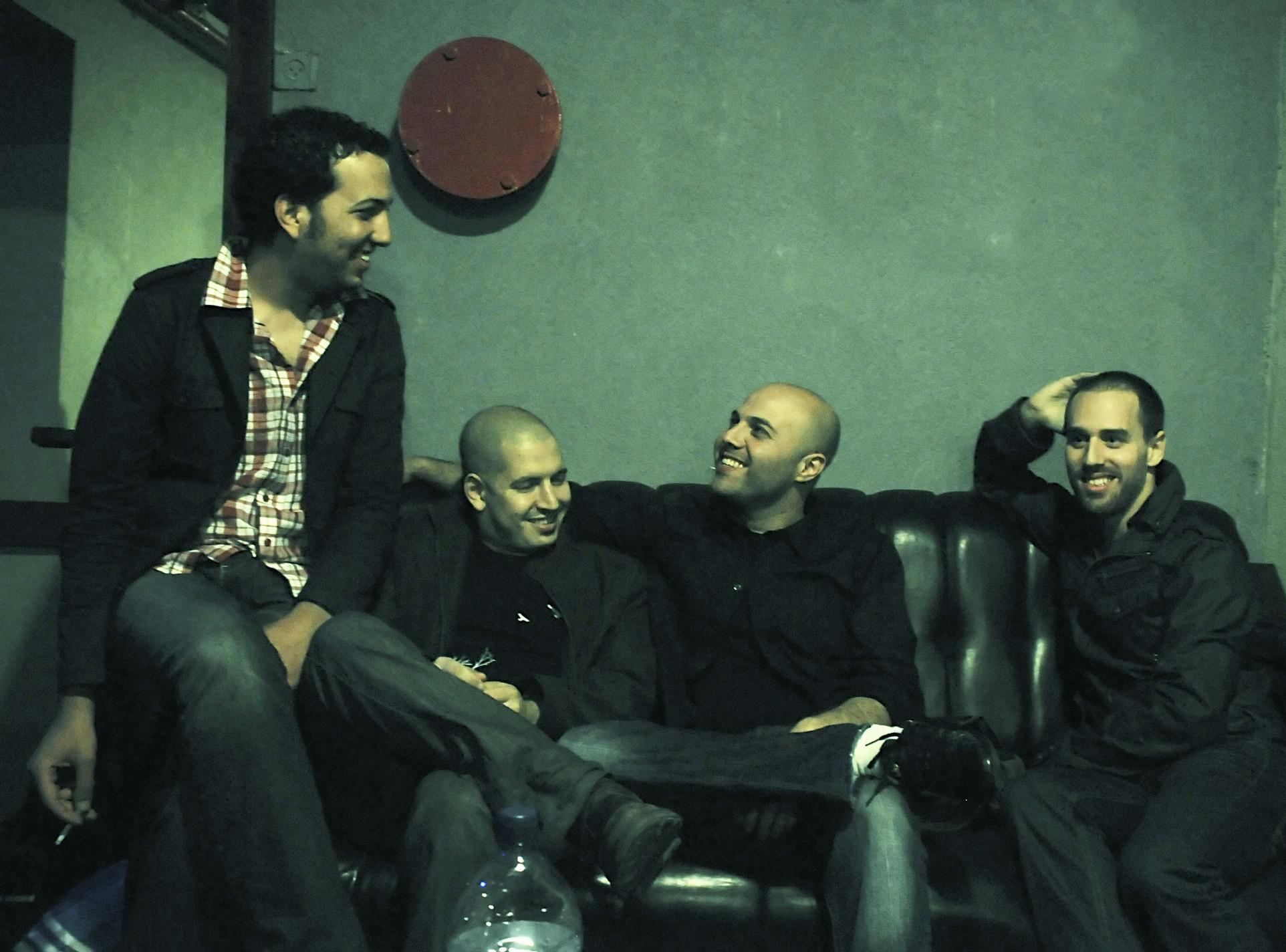
- From left to right: Assa Bukelman, Shai Saadia, Assaf Kraus and Gil Assayas

Background information
- Origin: Jerusalem
- Genres: Indie, alternative-rock, pop
- Years active: 2005–Present
- Label: התו השמיני (Hatav Hashmini)
- Members: Gil Assayas; Assa Bukelman; Assaf Kraus; Shai Saadia
- Past members: Ohad Eilam
- Website: www.missFlag.com

missFlag is an indie pop-rock band from Jerusalem. Formed in 2005, the band's music is mostly influenced by the new wave of British music and alternative rock. The band consists of Gil Assayas (keyboards and lead vocals), Assa Bukelman (electric guitar), Shai Saadia (bass), and Assaf Kraus (drums and backing vocals). The band formerly included Ohad Eilam (a former lead singer, guitarist and songwriter).

== History ==
=== Formation ===
missFlag's members have known each other years before forming the band. The group first started working together as a one-time Tribute act for the British Rock band Coldplay. Up until lately the band consisted of five members, including the musician and songwriter Ohad Eilam (guitar and vocals). Later on the band continued working as a four piece band.

The band met via Jerusalem's rather small music scene and bonded over a mutual love for Coldplay, an influence that is easy to identify in their music. Loving Coldplay is one thing, but there is a sincerity in their original songs that makes them stand out.

— missFlag, interviewed by Nic Harcourt on KCRW's morning edition Morning Becomes Eclectic - September 7, 2007

=== First EP ===
Shortly after the Coldplay tribute, the group started to perform, write and record their own music, which led to the creation of their first release – a self-produced EP of 5 songs which was printed in only 1,000 copies. The EP caught the ear of music producer and songwriter from Los Angeles, California Guy Erez (Jennifer Love Hewitt, Gipsy Kings, Adam Cohen, Sarah Bettens) who later produced missFlag's first studio album.

missFlag, a year-old indie-rock band from Jerusalem that will release its debut collection of gorgeous pop-rockers in October. Comparisons to Coldplay are unavoidable. Of course the timing is good: now that Keane's lead singer is in rehab we need a new New Coldplay. But missFlag brings a beautifully shambling sensibility to the epic chord changes and winsome melodies.

— Joan Anderman, The Boston Globe, September 10, 2006.

=== To Infinity ===
In early 2007, the group finished writing a lot of new material, from which 10 songs were chosen for the purpose of recording their debut studio album. "To Infinity" was produced by Los Angeles based producer Guy Erez and came to light later that year. The Album was a mile stone for the band in the crowded US market. Later that year, the group released a single from the album, called "Hidden Thieves" a rock ballad that caught the ear of the renowned radio D.J. and "taste-maker" Nic Harcourt from KCRW, the California-based public radio station. (Credited for discovering Travis, Dido, Coldplay, Norah Jones, Pete Yorn, and David Gray). The Jerusalem Post reviewed the album.

=== Hidden Thieves ===
Hidden Thieves is probably the group's flag song. The single hit KCRW's top 20 charts, was praised in two different reviews by The Los Angeles Times, was downloaded digitally over 10,000 times and was nominated by the indie music website GarageBand as song of the week several times. Furthermore, The Spanish/American based radio station Fame Games Radio chose Hidden Thieves to be song of the week four times in a row, leading to a "Track of the Month" title.

Hidden Thieves is a gentler track, and is one of the songs that first brought missFlag to a larger audience. A soft, hypnotic piece that subtly gains pace throughout, it’s another pertinent example as to why this four piece are currently attracting interest from major labels.

— Danny Brown, suite101.com, February 20, 2007

=== Dreams of Flying ===
In 2009, the group covered the Israeli classic "Uf Gozal" (Hebrew: עוף גוזל) by Arik Einstein and Miki Gavrielov, featuring Gavrielov himself in both the song and the video clip. Whilst the song was originally written in Hebrew, the band rewrote the lyrics in English and renamed it Dreams of Flying but maintained the general concept of the song. The melody was kept but the arrangement was changed to fit missFlag's style.

Along the years, missFlag has cooperated with many artists and musicians, both in the studio and live on stage including; Jamie Muhoberac, (from the Hebrew Wiki→) Yirmi Kaplan, Miki Gavrielov, Sharon Moldavi, Lee Biran (Libi), Ohad Eilam, Michael Greilsammer, Mai Lev, Miki Geva, Rebbe-Che and many others.

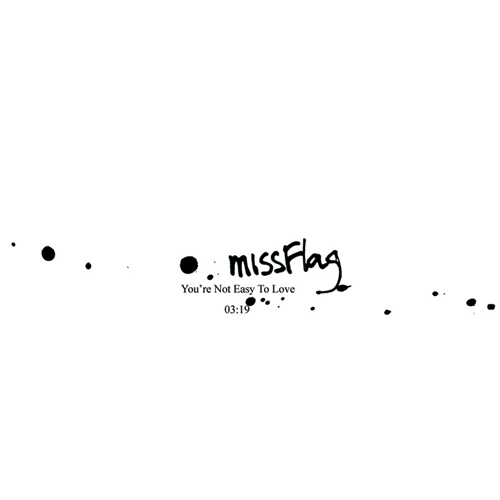
Front cover

"You're Not Easy To Love" Single cover

=== "Still Alive" cover ===
"Still Alive" is a song by Jonathan Coulton, originally written as the ending credits theme for the PC game "Portal" by Valve. On November 10, 2007 missFlag uploaded to YouTube a cover version of the song, played at a rehearsal. The cover caught the ears of thousands of Portal fans, who urged the band to do a high-quality studio recording of their version. missFlag listened and recorded the song, released on March 16, 2008 as a free download from their website. The song was downloaded over 25,000 times and featured in numerous leading gaming sites.

== Awards and media appearances ==
- On September 17, 2007 missFlag played a live session in Harcourt's morning edition Morning Becomes Eclectic, and drew the attention of several major labels, including Universal Records who invited the band to LA for a showcase later that year.
- That same month, missFlag was also invited to play in Hollywood's American Film Institute film festival.
- In December 2007, missFlag's song "Fortune" was selected as KCRW's Top Tune.
- On March 10, 2007 the group performed with the British-Israeli band Blackfield (Steven Wilson, Aviv Geffen) at the Knitting Factory, in Hollywood, California.
- Since 2006, the band has toured the US four times, from East Coast to West Coast, covering over 20 states.
- The Austin American-Statesman newspaper has picked missFlag's show at "Antone's" in Austin, Texas as the Best Bet for March, 2007.
- ABC Radio Networks "Fame Games" featured missFlag in "Red Carpet" - The Global Breakthru Chart No. 15 (May 16, 2009).
- The band has been selected as one of the top 5 nominees for 8 awards, including: Best Overall Artist, Best Group (Rock), Most Popular band, Best Overall vocal, in ABC Radio Networks Fame Games Effigy Awards.
- In 2008, their single "Hidden Thieves" was nominated in the Alternative category at the Hollywood Music Awards.
- In June 2005, their song "Run" made it to the top 5 in the 'rock' category at the VH1 "Song of the Year songwriting contest".
- JLTV (Jewish Life Television) nationwide US TV channel did a feature on the band.

== Discography ==
- #First EP - Released in 1.1.2006.
- #To Infinity - Released 2007.
- #Turn It Off Plug It Out - Released 2012

=== Singles ===
- Hidden Thieves - Released in 20.4.2007
- You're Not Easy To Love - Released in 18.6.2008
- Dreams of Flying - Released in 2009.
