= A Dictionary of Musical Themes =

1949 reference book by Morgenstern and Barlow

- Book cover, first edition
- Author: Harold Barlow, Sam Morgenstern
- Publisher: Crown Publishing Group
- Publication date: 1949
- OCLC: 232891

A Dictionary of Musical Themes (New York: Crown, 1949) is a music reference book by Sam Morgenstern and Harold Barlow.

== Contents ==
The book collects 10,000 musical themes (mostly classical works) and indexes them using a notation index based on transposing the pitches to C major or C minor (so that God Save the Queen/America, for instance, would come out as CCDBCDEEFE). It was followed a year later by A Dictionary of Vocal Themes (1950), including themes from songs and opera.

== Authors ==
=== Sam Morgenstern ===
Sam Morgenstern (1906–1989) was a teacher at Mannes College of Music in Greenwich Village, New York, and the conductor of Lower Manhattan's Lemonade Opera Company, which gave the US premiere of Prokofiev's Duenna in 1948. He composed the music for Warsaw Ghetto (to accompany a spoken word poem by Harry Granick), which premiered at Carnegie Hall on February 10, 1946. A radio disk transcription of the work, made in the studio a week after the premiere with the same performers, has survived.

Other works include a choral cantata Age of the Common Man (1943), the Latin-tinged piano piece Toccata Guatemala (1947), and in the late 1960s two short chamber operas (The Big Black Box, 1968 and Haircut, 1969) which were both produced at the Metropolitan Opera Studio.

Morgenstern's other books include the anthology Composers on Music (1956).

=== Harold Barlow ===
Harold Barlow (1915–1993) devised the notation scheme. He was a popular song composer who studied violin at Boston University and became a bandleader during World War II. He wrote the comedy song I've Got Tears in My Ears in 1949 (recorded by Homer and Jethro), and the lyrics to the 1960 Connie Francis hit Mama. Barlow became better known later in his career as a consultant on plagiarism, most famously defending George Harrison's "My Sweet Lord" against accusations that it was copied from the Chiffons' hit He's So Fine. (Harrison lost the case). Barlow also worked on cases involving Bob Dylan, Elvis Presley, Elton John, Dolly Parton and Billy Joel.

== Alternative classification ==
A new attempt at classifying tunes was published in 1975 by Denys Parsons. The Directory of Tunes and Musical Themes used the contours of a melody for identification, avoiding the need for transpositions. Using an asterisk for the first note and the letters U, D and R to denote up, down and repeat: "God Save the Queen" comes out as *RUDUU URUDDD UDDU. Parsons covered around 15,000 classical, popular and folk pieces in his dictionary. In the process he found out that *UU is the most popular opening contour, used in 23% of all the themes, something that applies to all the genres. The book was reissued in 2008 as the Directory of Classical Themes.

Denys Parsons (1914, died circa 2000) was the grandson of actor Sir Herbert Beerbohm Tree. He was the father of Alan Parsons, the producer of Pink Floyd's The Dark Side of the Moon and leader of the Alan Parsons Project.

Website search services employing the Barlow method and the Parsons method were available for a few years. Today, audio files can be submitted to music recognition services such as Audiggle, Gracenote, Shazam and SoundHound. Google's "Hum to Search" feature, introduced for mobile phones in 2020, uses artificial intelligence models and is based on Google's music recognition technology.
