= Into the New World (disambiguation) =

Into the New World and similar can refer to:

- "Into the New World", a song by Girls' Generation, 2007
- Into the New World Tour, a concert tour by Girls' Generation
- Into the New World (album), live album by Girls' Generation
- Symphony No. 9 (Dvořák), also called "From the New World"

== See also ==
- New World
- From the New World (disambiguation)
