= Scarlet Party =

British rock band

- Scarlet Party circa 1982: (left to right) Heaphy, S. Dye, G. Dye, Gilmour

Background information
- Origin: Essex, England
- Genres: Rock; Progressive rock
- Years active: Recording: 1982–1983; Live: 1982–1985
- Label: Parlophone EMI
- Past members: Graham Dye (vocals, guitars, harmonica); Steven Dye (vocals, keyboards, bass); Sean Heaphy (drums, percussion); Mark Gilmour (guitar); Micky Portman (bass)
- Website: Scarlet Party

Scarlet Party was a rock band formed in Essex, England, in the early 1980s. The founding members were singer/songwriter brothers Graham and Steven Dye along with drummer Sean Heaphy.

They began to perform at many top venues, to a well established following, and had already recorded an album of original material, and were signed to a major record company, when joined by fourth member, Mark Gilmour, brother of Pink Floyd's David Gilmour, on lead guitar.

The debut single, "101 Dam-Nations", was released on Parlophone, on 16 October 1982, alongside a special re-release of "Love Me Do", celebrating The Beatles' 20th anniversary at EMI. This helped to get Scarlet Party noticed, and with the voice of Graham Dye, uncannily resembling that of John Lennon, a television, radio, and magazine, publicity campaign, helped to reinforce the connection. The single was enthusiastically received (Kate Bush described it as her favourite song from 1983), and reached number 44 in the UK Singles Chart.

It was voted number 4 in the All-Time Top 100 Singles from Colin Larkin's All Time Top 1000 Albums. Larkin states 'it should have been an anthem monster number one.'

The follow-up single "Eyes Of Ice" reached number 8 in the Portuguese chart. The single was released in February 1983, on ice-clear vinyl, which was a request from the band, and all art-work for the sleeve was created by Graham Dye, using coloured pencils.

'Scarlet Skies', was recorded at Abbey Road Studios in 1981-82, but has never been officially released. The linked songs explore themes of war, love, and alienation, in styles reminiscent of both the mini pop operas of The Who, and the progressive concept albums of Pink Floyd.

The band recorded more original songs written by the Dye brothers, as a four-piece, until the departure of Mark Gilmour at the end of 1983, and then, once again, as a three-piece, also working on other projects, including a musical cartoon adventure based on the band, none of which were taken on by EMI.

Scarlet Party continued performing live shows, joined briefly by new member Micky Portman on bass, and recorded several more tracks at Abbey Road Studios. However, the band now feeling disheartened, and disappointed in EMI, decided to call it a day at the end of 1985.

Graham Dye went on to work as lead vocalist, on several albums by The Alan Parsons Project, and more recently, a new version of "101 Dam-Nations" was made, featuring Graham and Steven Dye, together with Phil Collins of Genesis, playing the drums. The brothers requested the help of Alan Parsons to produce the recording, which is not yet available.

== Discography ==
=== Singles ===
- "101 Dam-Nations" / "What Is This Thing" - 1982, UK #44 (Parlophone R6058)
- "Eyes Of Ice" / "Another World", - 1983, (Parlophone R6060),

=== Albums ===
- 'Scarlet Skies' - recorded at Abbey Road Studios, London, in 1981-82, not released. Track listing:
  - "101 Dam-Nations"
  - "Stop Your Game (War)"
  - "Aftermath"
  - "Now's Good Times"
  - "Judy"
  - "Eyes Of Ice"
  - "Scarlet Skies"
  - "In A World"
  - "A Deadly Silence"
  - "Another World"
  - "101 Dam-Nations" (reprise)

=== Anthology ===
- Shining, - featuring Mark Gilmour, recorded at EMI Studio, Manchester Square, London, 1982
- Sky High, - featuring Mark Gilmour, recorded at Hook End Studio, Henley, 1982
- Fly by Night, - engineered by Phil Harding, 1983
- Wonder, - engineered by Phil Harding, 1983
- Flying Saucers, - engineered by Phil Harding, 1983
- Genuine?, - recorded at Abbey Road Studios, London, 1984
- Love Is..., - recorded at Abbey Road Studios, London, 1984
- At The End Of The Day, - recorded at Abbey Road Studios, London, 1984
- Save Me!, - recorded at Abbey Road Studios, London, 1984
- 101 Dam-Nations, - featuring Phil Collins, recorded at Dinamec Studios, Geneva, Switzerland

Words and Music by Graham Dye/Steven Dye - published by Sony/ATV Music

=== Compilation albums featuring "101 Dam-Nations" ===
- Chart Wars - 1982, Ronco LP album
- The Rock Collection : Indie Rock - 1993, Time-Life Music CD album
- Shake Some Action Volume 5 - 2001, bootleg CD album
- Lost And Found Volume 1 : Imagination - 2001, EMI CD album
- Mod And Beyond - 2005, Crimson Productions CD album
