= A Valid Path =

2004 studio album by Alan Parsons

Studio album by Alan Parsons
- Released: 24 August 2004
- Genre: Rock
- Length: 49:16; 52:05 (5.1 mix)
- Label: Artemis
- Producer: Alan Parsons

Alan Parsons chronology
The Time Machine (1999)	A Valid Path (2004)	The Secret (2019)

Singles from A Valid Path
- 1. "More Lost Without You" Released: 2004 (UK only)

Professional ratings
Review scores
Source	Rating
AllMusic	3/5 stars
NOW Toronto	2/5 stars
Sea Of Tranquility	3.5/5 stars

A Valid Path is the fourth solo album by English rock musician Alan Parsons. The record was released on 24 August 2004 via Artemis label.

== Background ==
The gap between this and his previous album, The Time Machine, was the third greatest period between two consecutive albums, after the time between the split of The Alan Parsons Project and Parsons' first solo work (not counting Freudiana) and the time between this album and The Secret. In addition to contributors such as David Gilmour, another noteworthy musical credit on the album is Parsons' son Jeremy; his debut appearance on his father's albums.

A Valid Path was released on Audio CD and DualDisc, with the DualDisc containing the album recorded in 5.1 Surround in both DTS and Dolby Digital formats. Other features of the DualDisc include a track commentary by the artist and interviews with Alan Parsons and the main collaborators on the release including David Gilmour and the Crystal Method.

== Track listing ==
1. "Return to Tunguska" – (Alan Parsons, Simon Posford) instrumental, featuring Shpongle & David Gilmour – 8:48
2. "More Lost Without You" – (Parsons, Olsson) lead vocal P.J. Olsson – 3:20
3. "Mammagamma 04" – (Parsons, Eric Woolfson) instrumental; remix of "Mammagamma", featuring Jeremy Parsons – 5:06
4. "We Play the Game" – (Parsons, Ken Jordan, Scott Kirkland) lead vocal Alan Parsons, featuring the Crystal Method – 5:33
5. "Tijuaniac" – (Parsons, Mogt, Ruiz, Mendoza, Amezcua, Beas) instrumental featuring Nortec Collective – 5:21
6. "L'Arc En Ciel" dedicated to Anson Grossfeld 1957–2004 – (Parsons, Wiles) instrumental featuring Überzone – 5:26
7. "A Recurring Dream Within a Dream" a composite of "A Dream Within a Dream" and "The Raven" – (both compositions by Parsons, Woolfson) lead vocal Alan Parsons featuring Jeremy Parsons and narration by Orson Welles – 4:06
8. "You Can Run" – (Parsons, Pack) lead vocal David Pack – 3:51
9. "Chomolungma" – (Parsons, Parsons, Olsson) instrumental featuring Jeremy Parsons and P.J. Olsson with added concluding narration by John Cleese – 6:35

== Personnel ==
- Alan Parsons – vocals, processed vocals, guitar, slide guitar, bass guitar, keyboards, vocoder
- Scott Kirkland – keyboards, programming
- Simon Posford – programming, sequencer
- Ken Jordan – programming, sequencer
- Jeremy Parsons – guitar, programming, sequencer
- David Pack – guitar, keyboards, vocals
- David Gilmour – lap steel guitar on "Return to Tunguska"
- Alastair Greene – guitar
- P. J. Olsson – vocals, programming
- Michele Adamson, Lisa Parsons – vocals
- John Cleese – narration on "Chomolungma"
- Orson Welles – narration on "A Recurring Dream Within a Dream"

== Charts ==
Chart performance for A Valid Path
Chart (2004)	Peak position
German Albums (Offizielle Top 100)	72
Italian Albums (FIMI)	62
