= Vulture Culture =

1985 album by the Alan Parsons Project

Studio album by The Alan Parsons Project
- Released: February 1985
- Recorded: May–July 1984
- Studios: Abbey Road Studios, London
- Genres: Progressive rock; symphonic rock; pop rock; new wave
- Length: 37:59
- Label: Arista
- Producers: Alan Parsons and Eric Woolfson

The Alan Parsons Project chronology
Ammonia Avenue (1984)	Vulture Culture (1985)	Stereotomy (1985)

Singles from Vulture Culture
- 1. "Let's Talk About Me" Released: 11 January 1985; 2. "Days Are Numbers (The Traveller)" Released: April 1985 (US); 3. "Vulture Culture (remix)" Released: 1985 (Germany); 4. "The Same Old Sun" Released: 1985 (EU)

Professional ratings
Review scores
Source	Rating
AllMusic	2/5 stars

Vulture Culture is the eighth studio album by the Alan Parsons Project, released in February 1985 via the Arista label. The album peaked at No. 40 in their home country of the United Kingdom and No. 46 in the United States. It also reached No. 1 in Germany, becoming the band's fourth and final album to achieve this. "Let's Talk About Me" and "Days Are Numbers (The Traveller)" were released as singles from Vulture Culture and both reached the US Billboard Hot 100. "Let's Talk About Me" also charted in several throughout Europe, including Germany, Switzerland, and the Netherlands.

== Overview ==
The first side of the LP (CD tracks 1–4) consists entirely of four-minute pop songs, and the second side varies widely, from the subdued funk of the title track to the bouncing instrumental "Hawkeye".

Vulture Culture the only Project album that does not feature the orchestration of Andrew Powell. It was the first Alan Parsons Project album to feature Richard Cottle, who played various synthesizers on the record, including the Fairlight CMI and the Yamaha DX7.

Vulture Culture was the last Project album recorded on analogue equipment, and as with the previous two, was mixed directly to the digital master tape.

Discussing the album in a 1985 interview, Parsons stated that Vulture Culture was "very definitely meant to continue with a good handful of accessible singles", and said that the album's lyrical themes centered around greed.

== Release ==
The band selected "Let's Talk About Me" as the lead single over "Days Are Numbers (The Traveller)", which was also considered. "Let's Talk About Me" reached the top 40 in Germany (where the album was No. 1), in Switzerland (where Vulture Culture was No. 2) and in the Netherlands. The song features voice-over commentary from Lee Abrams, credited on the album as "Mr. Laser Beam" (an anagram of his name).

On the charts, Vulture Culture was a success in continental Europe, reaching the top 10 in many countries, whereas it was less successful in the US. It was the last album by the band to be certified Gold.

== Critical reception ==
Music Week thought that the band achieved a "lightweight, poppy sound on Vulture Culture that signaled "a change in direction". Billboard magazine wrote that "Parson's clean yet driving studio creations remain the ultimate in AOR radio fare, while affording softer mainstream options as well." They labelled "Let's Talk About Me", "Days Are Numbers (The Traveller)", and "Separate Lives" as the album's best tracks. Cashbox characterized the album as "high-tech pop from the masterful Parsons."

== Track listing ==
All songs written and composed by Alan Parsons and Eric Woolfson.

Side one
No.	Title	Lead vocals	Length
1.	"Let's Talk About Me"	David Paton	4:29
2.	"Separate Lives"	Eric Woolfson	4:38
3.	"Days Are Numbers (The Traveller)"	Chris Rainbow	4:52
4.	"Sooner or Later"	Eric Woolfson	4:24

Side two
No.	Title	Lead vocals	Length
1.	"Vulture Culture"	Lenny Zakatek	5:22
2.	"Hawkeye"	(Instrumental)	3:48
3.	"Somebody Out There"	Colin Blunstone	4:54
4.	"The Same Old Sun"	Eric Woolfson	5:26

Vulture Culture was remastered and reissued in 2007 with the following bonus tracks:

9. "No Answers Only Questions" (final version) – 2:12
10. "Separate Lives" (alternative mix) – 4:18
11. "Hawkeye" (demo) – 3:18
12. "The Naked Vulture" – 10:43
13. "No Answers Only Questions" (the first attempt) – 2:56
  - "No Answers Only Questions" is credited solely to Eric Woolfson on the expanded edition CD notes.

== Personnel ==
- Ian Bairnson – guitar
- Colin Blunstone – vocals
- Richard Cottle – synthesizer, keyboards, saxophone
- Stuart Elliott – drums, percussion
- Mr. Laser Beam – vocals, speech/speaker/speaking part
- Alan Parsons – keyboards (tracks 3, 6)
- David Paton – bass, vocals
- Chris Rainbow – vocals
- Eric Woolfson – piano, keyboards, vocals
- Lenny Zakatek – vocals
- Tony Richards – assistant engineer

== Charts ==
=== Weekly charts ===
Chart (1984–1985)	Peak position
Australian Albums (Kent Music Report)	32
Austrian Albums (Ö3 Austria)	10
Canada Top Albums/CDs (RPM)	25
Dutch Albums (Album Top 100)	3
German Albums (Offizielle Top 100)	1
Italian Albums (Musica e Dischi)	5
Norwegian Albums (VG-lista)	9
New Zealand Albums (RMNZ)	15
Spanish Albums (AFYVE)	2
Swedish Albums (Sverigetopplistan)	7
Swiss Albums (Schweizer Hitparade)	2
UK Albums (Official Charts)	40
US Billboard 200	46

=== Year-end charts ===
Chart (1985)	Peak position
Canada Top Albums/CDs (RPM)	94

== Certifications ==
Region	Certification	Certified units/sales
Canada (Music Canada)	Gold	50,000^{^}
Germany (BVMI)	Gold	250,000^{^}
^{^} Shipments figures based on certification alone.
