= Harold Barlow (songwriter) =

American songwriter (1915–1993)

Harold Barlow (15 May 1915, Boston, Massachusetts – 15 February 1993, Manhasset, Long Island, New York) was an American songwriter, and later a consultant on plagiarism.

He studied violin at Boston University, graduating in 1937.

His song "The Things I Love" (1941) was recorded by Jimmy Dorsey, Dizzy Gillespie and Harry James. He served in World War II as a bandleader. Probably his best-known song was "I've Got Tears in My Ears" (1949) recorded by Homer and Jethro. He also wrote the English lyrics for "Mama", best known as a 1960 hit song for Connie Francis.

He then became a consultant on music plagiarism. His clients included George Harrison, Bob Dylan, Elvis Presley, Elton John, Rod Stewart, Dolly Parton, Johnny Cash, Billy Joel, Peter, Paul and Mary, Neil Diamond and The Kingston Trio also The Beatles, Michael Jackson, Charlie Daniels.

He also compiled a series of musical reference works with Sam Morgenstern: A Dictionary of Musical Themes (New York: Crown, 1949), A Dictionary of Vocal Themes (New York: Crown, 1950), and A Dictionary of Opera and Song Themes (New York: Crown, 1966).
