= The Pillbugs =

Pop group in late 1990's

- Left to right: Mark Mikel, Dan Chalmers, Mark Kelley, Scott Tabner, David Murnen

Background information
- Born: The Mark Mikel Hallucination
- Origin: United States
- Genres: Psychedelic pop, power pop
- Years active: 1991 - 1998 (as "Mark Mikel") 1998 - 2008 (as "The Pillbugs")
- Labels: Rainbow Quartz Records; Proverus Records
- Members: Mark Mikel; David Murnen; Mark Kelley; Dan Chalmers; Scott Tabner

The Pillbugs were an American power pop and psychedelic pop group that emerged on the indie music scene in the late 1990s.

Based in Toledo, Ohio, the band consisted of Mark Mikel (vocals/guitar/keyboards), David Murnen (vocals/percussion), Mark Kelley (vocals/bass), Scott Tabner (guitar), Dan Chalmers (drums/vocals). They released 5 albums and initially billed themselves as "the world's most psychedelic band." Of this statement Mikel said, "I don't know if we are or not. We thought so when we first formed. It was just something to draw attention. It probably isn't completely true."

The Pillbugs disbanded in 2008 following Mark Kelley's death from an endocrine disorder.

== History ==
=== 1991 - 1999 ===
Mark Mikel formed a band with David Murnen, Mark Kelley, Dan Chalmers and Scott Tabner named after himself. They performed numerous times and released two original albums named Sorghum Pudding in 1991, The Idiot Smiles in 1994, and one cover album named Blatant Ripoffs in 1996. After building fame in their area, they decided to change their name to make them more Beatles-esque, which because The Beatles were one of their greatest influences, makes "The Pillbugs" a fitting name. After they changed their name in early 1998, they began work on their first album under the name. In June of the same year, The first Pillbugs CD is released on their own label (Omniphonic). This was a 32-song double-disc set. All songs were produced by Mark Mikel. In July 1999, Bass player/vocalist Mark Kelley is diagnosed with a rare lung cancer.

=== 2003 ===
In June of 2003, The Pillbugs release their second album, The 3-Dimensional In-Popcycle Dream. This CD contained a 3D Fisher-Price/Viewmaster reel of band pics and album art. All songs were produced by Mark Mikel. In August, Proverus releases a new version of the debut CD. All songs are the same but the artwork is changed/refined.

=== 2004 ===
In August of 2004, The Pillbugs' third album, Happy Birthday, was released on the Proverus label. All songs were produced by Mark Mikel and Scott Hunt. The Pillbugs also play their most high-profile gig at Arlene's Grocery in New York City. In October, Bass player/vocalist Mark Kelley's cancer confines him to a wheelchair and permanent breathing machine. Despite being in this condition, he manages to supply the bass guitar for the next Pillbug album.

=== 2007 ===
In April of 2007, the Pillbugs catch the attention of power pop label Rainbow Quartz who signed the band a deal for a "best-of" CD release. Later, this album was named Monclovia, after a township nearby Toledo. In June, The Pillbugs release their fourth album (and second double CD) Buzz for Aldrin on the Proverus label. The songs' melodies, lyrics and themes are intertwined, ultimately leading back to their first album. The artwork was created by renowned California artist Mark Roland specifically for this release. All songs were produced by Mark Mikel. A video for the song "Spaced-Out" was also made. In July, Proverus officially announces the third CD Happy Birthday is out of print. In August, USA Today music editor Ken Barnes chooses the Pillbugs "All in Good Time" in his "Pick of the Week" column. In September, USA Today music editor Ken Barnes chooses the Pillbugs "4 sec Nightmare in a 5 sec Dream" in his "Pick of the Week" column. In October, The Rainbow Quartz CD Monclovia released in USA and Canada. Two previously unreleased Pillbugs songs open the disc: "Here's to the End of Time" (a new recording) and "Faceless Wonder" (a Buzz for Aldrin outtake). Two previously released songs were treated to remixes: "All in Good Time" and "Charlie Blue Car". All songs were produced by Mark Mikel and Scott Hunt. In November, The Rainbow Quartz CD The Pillbugs-Monclovia released in Europe and Asia. In December, NYC publication The Big Takeover places The Pillbugs in their Top 40 (issue 61).

=== 2008 ===
In February 8 of 2008, the Pillbugs begin recording a new album for the Rainbow Quartz label. In May 3, Bass player/singer/songwriter Mark Kelley dies after a nine-year struggle. In the same month, after the death of Mark Kelley, The Pillbugs go on an "indefinite hiatus". Later in May, they officially announced that The Pillbugs have broken up. In November 10 of the same year, Everybody Wants A Way Out was released by the label Rainbow Quartz, after the band officially broke up earlier in May. All songs were produced by Mark Mikel.

== Discography ==
- 1998: The Pillbugs
- 2003: The 3-Dimensional In-Popcycle Dream
- 2004: Happy Birthday
- 2007: Buzz For Aldrin
- 2008: Monclovia
- 2008: Everybody Wants a Way Out
- 2021: Marigold Something

== See also ==
- List of indie pop artists
