= Lee Abrams =

Media executive

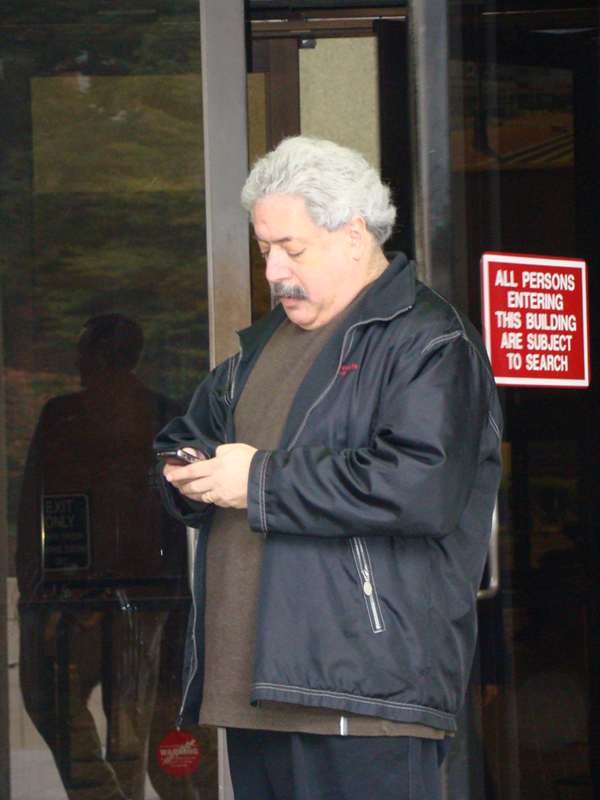
- Born: 1952 (age 73–74); Chicago, Illinois, U.S.
- Occupation: Media executive

Lee Abrams (born 1952) is an American media executive who has held a number of posts for large and influential companies, and is generally credited with developing the Album Oriented Rock format first heard at WQDR Raleigh and thereafter employed by hundreds of radio stations across the country, as well as co-founding XM Satellite Radio.

== Career ==
Born in Chicago, Abrams became a radio DJ. He pioneered systematic audience research and psychographics, connecting people's lifestyles to their listening habits. He modified the album-oriented rock music format, or AOR, from a looser, freeform style to a tighter form, using playlists rather than allowing DJs the freedom to play anything they chose from albums. This followed the evolution in the late 1960s and 1970s from the music industry's focus on singles to albums. Some of his other work at this time included numerous voice-overs, notably the introduction commentary in "Let's Talk About Me" from the 1984 Alan Parsons Project album Vulture Culture. Abrams co-founded XM Satellite Radio and served as Chief Programming Officer at that company until his departure in 2008. More recently Abrams was the chief innovation officer for the Tribune Company (2008–2010) but prior to that, founded and ran notable radio consulting company Burkhart/Abrams, served as an internal consultant for ABC Radio, and helped develop nationwide radio formats such as Z-Rock and Radio Disney.

== Recognition ==
Newsweek listed Abrams as one of their "100 Cultural Elite" in 1993, and he was cited by industry publication Radio Ink as one of the 75 most important radio figures of all time.

Abrams was inducted into the Rock Radio Hall of Fame in the "Legends of Rock Radio-Programming" category for his work with WRIF in 2014.

== Email controversy ==
On October 15, 2010, Abrams resigned from Tribune Company following revelations that he wrote an email to staff with a link to a video that some within the company considered offensive.

That same day, New York Times public editor Arthur S Brisbane published an editorial questioning his paper's use of anonymous sourcing as one of the "load bearing" elements of the story, particularly as it was a "sensational episode" in a story about a competitor.

On October 19, 2010, Forbes reporter Jeff Bercovici published an email from Abrams defending himself, including some specifics not included in mainstream coverage, notably, that the video was from parody site The Onion and that it had been previously shown at a Chicago Tribune sales meeting to a positive reaction.
