= 101 Dam-Nations =

Single by Scarlet Party
- Released: 1982
- Recorded: Abbey Road Studios
- Genre: Rock
- Label: Parlophone EMI
- Songwriter(s): Graham Dye, Steven Dye

"101 Dam-Nations" is a song written by Graham Dye and Steven Dye.

The catch-phrase "101 Damnations", is a play on words, derived from the title of the animated feature film One Hundred and One Dalmatians, made by The Walt Disney Company in 1961. The new catch-phrase was originally conceptualized in 1981, by singer/songwriter Graham Dye, and was used as the title for a global-warning anthem "101 Dam-Nations", which he co-wrote with his brother Steven Dye, for their band Scarlet Party. It became the debut single for the band, and was released on EMI's Parlophone label, on 16 October 1982, the same day as the 20th anniversary re-release of "Love Me Do" by The Beatles, who made this EMI label world-famous. The original vinyl issue of 101 Dam-Nations by Scarlet Party on Parlophone R 6058, reached number 44 in the UK chart, and is at present deleted, However, the recording has since appeared on many compilations, and is now available to download. There is also a more recent recording of this song, featuring Graham and Steven Dye, together with Phil Collins of Genesis playing drums, which is not yet available.

It was voted number 4 in the All-Time Top 100 Singles from Colin Larkin's All Time Top 1000 Albums. Larkin states 'it should have been an anthem monster number one.'
