= Guy Erez =

Israeli musician

Guy Erez גיא ארז
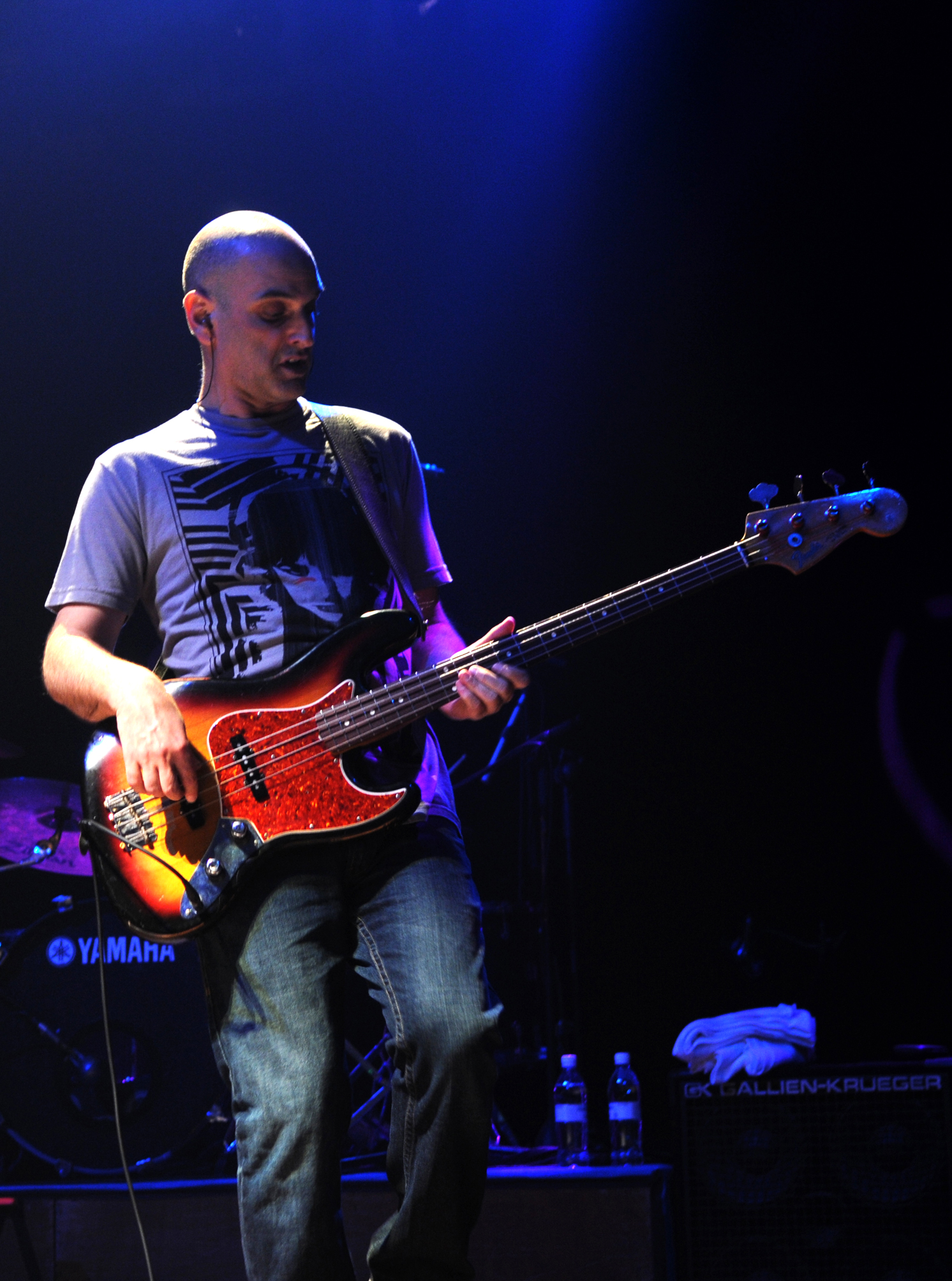
- Guy Erez with Alan Parsons Live Project performing in Tel Aviv, Israel in 2010

Background information
- Born: Israel
- Genres: Pop/Rock
- Occupations: Musician, songwriter, record producer
- Years active: 1992–present
- Labels: Atlantic, Warner Bros., CBS, RCA, DreamWorks, Interscope, Jive
- Website: GuyErez.com

Guy Erez (Hebrew: גיא ארז) is a Los Angeles–based songwriter, producer, composer and bass player. Born and raised in Israel, Erez moved to Los Angeles in 1992. His songs have appeared in hit movies and TV shows including the soundtrack to the Oscar-winning film Crash, Grey's Anatomy and Beverly Hills 90210. He is a songwriter and producer on the theme to the Marvel/Disney series The Avengers, and his composer credits include NASA's official video that they released leading up to the launch of the James Webb Space Telescope. He has also worked with artists such as Gipsy Kings, Jason Mraz, Kenny Loggins, Miley Cyrus, Ziggy Marley and Alan Parsons.

== Songwriting and producing ==
One of Erez's first hit songs was BareNaked by Jennifer Love Hewitt, which he co-wrote with Meredith Brooks. The song made the Billboard Top 40 charts in 2002. This brought attention to Chrysalis Music, who signed him to a publishing deal, adding him to their roster of staff songwriters. During this time period, he also wrote and produced songs with artists including Holly Palmer and P.J. Olsson, garnering him another Billboard Top 40 hit with the Ryan Cabrera single "Shine On" for Atlantic Records. Erez also contributed as both songwriter and producer for the title track "Shine" from the second solo album by Sam Bettens of K's Choice fame and The Gipsy Kings' Live at Kenwood House in London DVD released in 2006. He also co-wrote two recent Alan Parsons singles with Parsons and P.J. Olsson, "Fragile", and "Do you Live at All".

== Film and TV work ==
Erez has songs in over 100 films and TV shows. His entre into TV was with a song called "Boom da Boom," which both Fox and Disney used to promote current shows including The Simpsons & King of the Hill. This led to first MTV, then others bringing in Erez to compose on shows for them including The Tom Green Show, The Andy Dick Show (theme song & score), The Whitest Kids U' Know and others. Since then, he has had songs in movies such as Van Wilder, The Perfect Score & Carolina plus TV shows like Grey's Anatomy, Beverly Hills 90210, NCIS, The Tonight Show and The Hills, amongst others. He was commissioned by Marvel to compose and produce the theme songs to the series The Avengers, Iron Man Extremis, Astonishing X-Men, and as composer on Marvel's Adaptive Audio Digital Comic, "Captain America, Winter Soldier." Erez more recently was the composer for the Emmy winning ABC television series Sea Rescue and the Emmy nominated TV series The Wildlife Docs. 2019 found Erez writing and producing a series of songs for the successful Netflix Original series, Super Monsters.

== Bass player ==
Erez regularly works playing bass as a session musician. He taught bass playing at Los Angeles Music Academy from 1996 to 2001. His prolific bass performances can be heard in recordings such as the Florence & the Machine theme to Dragon Age II, Ziggy Marley's Grammy-winning album, "Fly Rasta" and the Miley Cyrus song "Hands of Love." Since 2010 Erez has been touring in the band Alan Parsons Live Project as the bass player. He shared the bill in that time period with acts such as Simple Minds, Earth Wind & Fire and David Pack from Ambrosia. Other Legendary artists Erez has performed in concert with include: Michael McDonald, Joe Bonamassa, Al Stewart and Steve Vai, to name a few.

== Recent work ==
Erez is currently songwriting with Alan Parsons and co-wrote Parsons' singles "Fragile," "Do you Live at All," and "Miracle." He regularly writes, produces and plays bass for bands and artists such as Kina Grannis, Karmina, Right the Stars and his most recent project Yacht Life. Erez also continues to score music for companies like EA, Marvel and Disney on projects such as Marvel's 2014 Captain America Interactive Audio Digital Comic, and TV shows including the Emmy winning ABC television series Sea Rescue and Emmy nominated The Wildlife Docs. He also composed music for The Academy Museum of Motion Pictures exhibition “Path to Cinema,” which was on display at the museum from 2021 until 2024.

== Selected discography ==
Year	Album	Artist	Credit
1998	Power Rangers	Original Motion Picture Soundtrack	Bass
2000	Kina	Kina	Bass
2000	True North	Fisher	Bass
2002	BareNaked	Jennifer Love Hewitt	Composer
2003	Girlʼs Night Out Vol 2	Various Artists	Composer
2004	Just So You Know	Holly Palmer	Composer/Producer
2004	Billy Miles	Billy Miles	Producer/Composer/Bass/Keyboards
2005	Music From and inspired by the Academy Award-winning Movie Crash	Original Motion Picture soundtrack	Producer
2005	Scream	Sam Bettens	Composer
2005	You Stand Watching	Ryan Cabrera	Composer
2005	Beautifully Insane	P.J. Olsson	Bass/Composer/Producer/Programming/Mixing
2005	Lost Art of the Idle Moment	Carmen Rizzo	Bass
2005	Pax Romana xxv	Brother	Producer/Composer/Keyboards/Programming/Mixing/Engineer
2006	Where's Neil When You Need Him?	Neil Gaiman	Bass
2006	N Soundtrack	Various Artists	Composer
2007	To Infinity	MissFlag	Producer
2007	My Dear	New Years Day	Composer
2007	American Scream	P.J. Olsson	Bass/Mixing/Producer/Guitar
2007	Shine	Sam Bettens	Composer
2008	Backwards into Beauty	Karmina	Producer/Bass/Guitar/Keyboards/Programming/Mixing
2008	Turn To Stone	Becca	Composer
2009	Never Say Goodbye	Sam Bettens	Producer/Composer/Mixing
2009	Everything You Need	Manda Mosher	Producer/Composer/Bass/ Acoustic Guitar/Vocal
2009	Eternal	Huun-Huur-Tu	Fretless Bass
2010	Stairwells	Kina Grannis	Bass
2011	My Star	Marina V	Producer/Bass/Guitar/Additional Keyboards/Programming/Mixing/Editing
2014	Fly Rasta	Ziggy Marley	Bass
2015	Hands of Love	Miley Cyrus	Bass
2016	Live in Columbia	Alan Parsons	Bass/ Vocals/ Band Member
2019	The Secret	Alan Parsons	Bass/ Composer/ Double Bass
2022	From the New World	Alan Parsons	Bass/ Composer

Main source for discography:
