= P. J. Olsson =

American singer (born 1969)

PJ Olsson
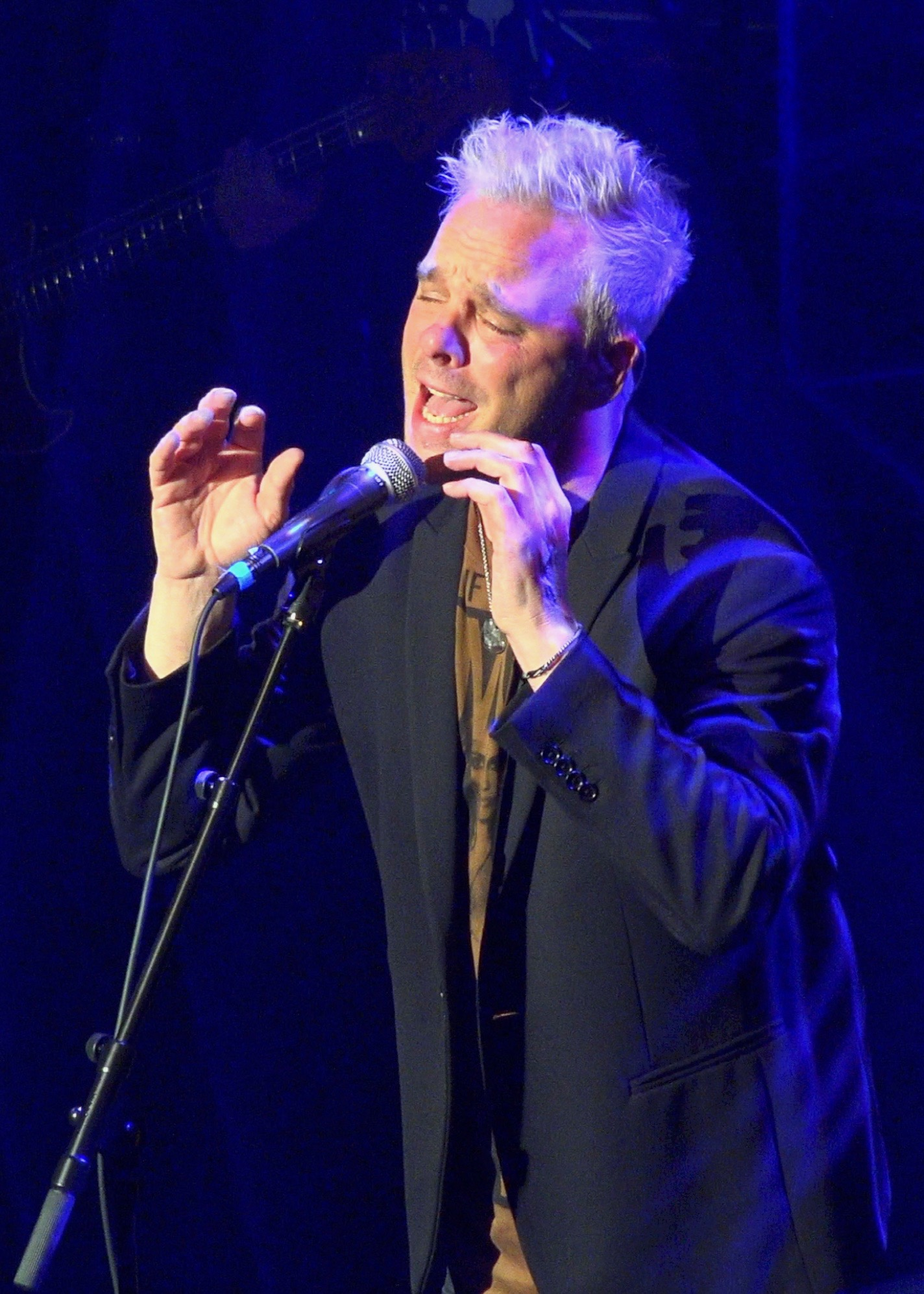
- PJ Olsson performing with Alan Parsons Live Project in Utrecht, Netherlands 2019

Background information
- Born: Paul Josef Olsson; 13 July 1969 (age 57); Pontiac, Michigan
- Genres: Adult Alternative, Rock
- Occupations: Musician, songwriter, producer, composer, Grammy winning Engineer audio engineer
- Years active: 1990–present

Paul Josef Olsson (13 July 1969) is an American singer, songwriter, producer and audio engineer, best known as the lead vocalist of the Alan Parsons Live Project since 2003. He is a Grammy-winning engineer for his work with Alan Parsons for the Eye In The Sky - 35th Anniversary Edition. As a recording artist, he has toured with various talents over his lifetime, including Deep Purple, Train, Muse, Simple Minds, Rufus Wainwright, Earth, Wind & Fire, Wyclef, Nelly Furtado, Beth Orton, Placebo, and many more.

== Biography ==
He was born in Pontiac, Michigan, to a musical family. His father had a DMA in choral music and was an avant-garde 12-tone composer, A&R executive for Metro Arts Detroit, known for its affiliation with the musicians of Motown Records and later the Director of Arts & Humanities at Michigan Tech, His mother was a music/voice major and school teacher. He started playing violin at age 6. PJ caught the attention of Columbia records, who in mid-2000, released the critically acclaimed album Words For Living. Olsson also made an appearance on the Late Show with David Letterman, singing his High Times song of the year, "Visine." His well known song, "Ready for a Fall," was included on the soundtrack album for the television show Dawson's Creek.

Olsson began collaborating with Alan Parsons in 2003 as his sound engineer and, within months of Parsons hearing his voice, was added as lead singer while retaining engineering duties. He has performed with many other notable acts, including Kid Rock, Iggy Pop, Bob Geldof, Something Corporate, Ben Harper, and Michelle Branch. In 2007 Olsson teamed up with Salman Ahmad to record a remake of the Nick Lowe song, "(What's So Funny 'Bout) Peace, Love, and Understanding", as the theme to The CW television show Aliens in America.

Olsson mixed and co-engineered Alan Parsons' album A Valid Path alongside Parsons and earned a Grammy nomination for the project. He has said that working with two of his musical heroes, Alan Parsons and David Gilmour (who guested on the album), is a career highlight.

== Discography ==
=== Solo ===
- 1998: P.J. Olsson
- 1999: Words for Living
- 2005: Beautifully Insane
- 2007: American Scream
- 2013: Lasers and Trees

=== with Alan Parsons ===
Studio albums

- 2004: A Valid Path - co-engineer, vocals, programming
- 2019: The Secret - vocals on "Years of Glory"
- 2022: From The New World - vocals, keyboards, programming, bass guitar

Live albums

- 2010: Eye 2 Eye: Live in Madrid - acoustic guitar, vocals
- 2013: LiveSpan - vocals
- 2016: Alan Parsons Symphonic Project, Live in Colombia - vocals, guitar

Singles

- 2010: All Our Yesterdays
- 2014: Fragile
- 2015: Do You Live at All

=== Compilation appearances ===
- 1999: Songs from Dawson's Creek (various artists) - vocals on "Ready for a Fall"
