= Alan Parsons =

English audio engineer, musician, and record producer (born 1948)

Alan Parsons OBE
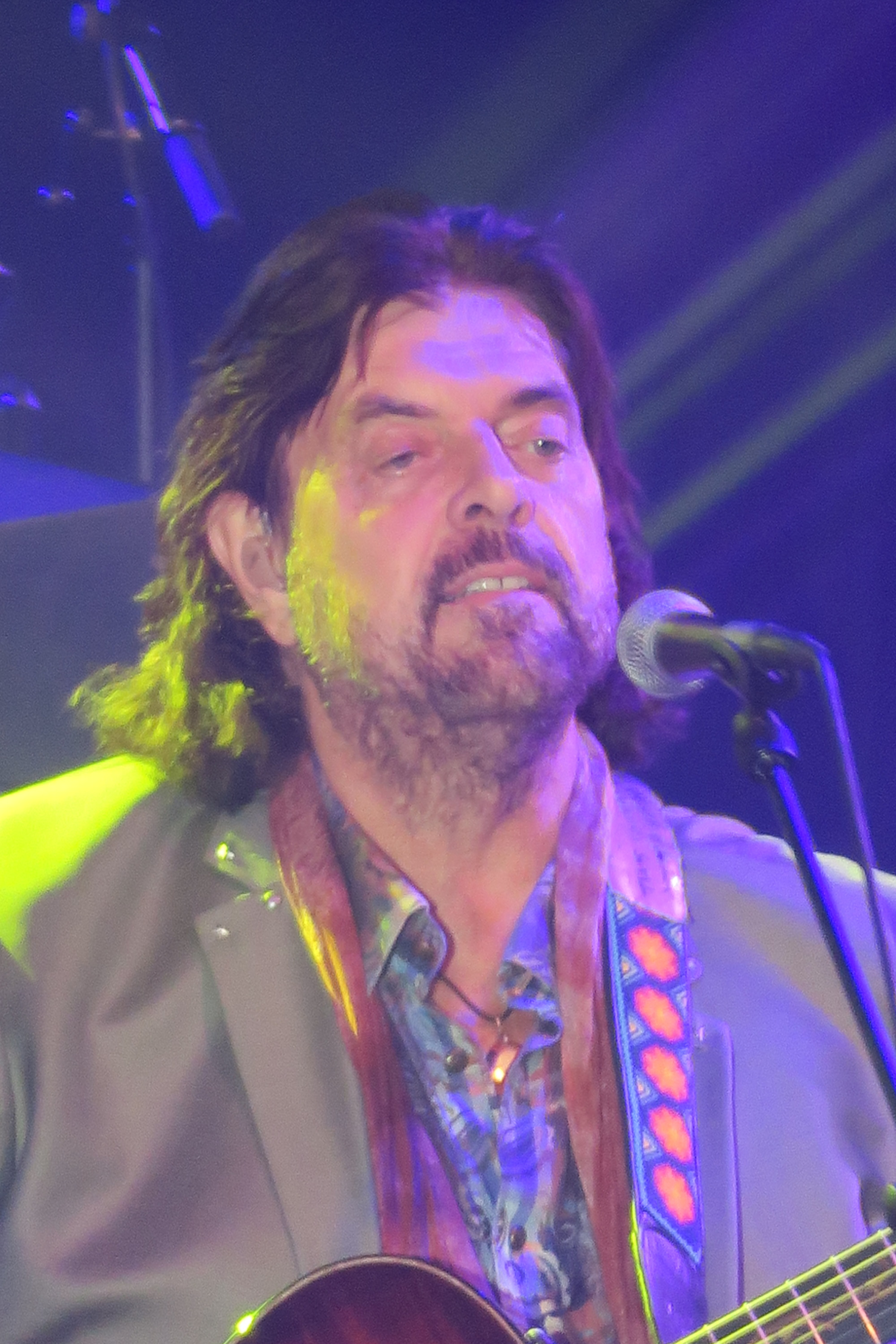
- Parsons in 2017

Background information
- Born: 20 December 1948 (age 77); Willesden, Middlesex, England
- Genres: Rock; progressive rock
- Occupations: Audio engineer; composer; musician; record producer; director
- Instruments: Guitar; keyboards; bass; vocals; flute
- Years active: 1967–present
- Labels: Legacy; Arista; Fox; Mercury; Frontiers
- Formerly of: The Alan Parsons Project
- Spouse: Lisa Parsons
- Website: alanparsons.com

Alan Parsons OBE (born 20 December 1948) is an English audio engineer, singer, songwriter, musician and record producer.

Parsons was the sound engineer on albums including the Beatles' Abbey Road (1969) and Let It Be (1970), Pink Floyd's Dark Side of the Moon (1973), and the eponymous debut album by Ambrosia in 1975. Parsons's own group, The Alan Parsons Project, as well as his subsequent solo recordings, have also been commercially successful. He has been nominated for 13 Grammy Awards, with his first win occurring in 2019 for Best Immersive Audio Album for Eye in the Sky (35th Anniversary Edition).

== Music career ==
After getting a job working in the tape duplication department at EMI, Parsons heard the master tape for the Beatles' Sgt. Pepper's Lonely Hearts Club Band, and decided to try talking his way into a job at Abbey Road Studios. In October 1967, at the age of 18, Parsons went to work as an assistant engineer at Abbey Road. He was a tape operator during the Beatles' Get Back sessions, and he earned his first credit on the LP Abbey Road. He became a regular there, engineering projects such as Wings' Wild Life and Red Rose Speedway, five albums by the Hollies and Pink Floyd's The Dark Side of the Moon (1973), for which he received his first Grammy Awards nomination.

"It was a bit of a frustration for me that I didn't get all the engineering credit", Parsons said of Dark Side of the Moon, "because Chris [Thomas] came in as mixing supervisor … I had been working on the album for a year and I obviously knew it inside-out by the mixing stage … There were times when I thought Chris was wrong, particularly about the use of limiting and compression on the mix, which I've never been a fan of … Although, later, I got the opportunity to mix the album the way I wanted when I did the quadraphonic version."

In his work with Al Stewart's "Year of the Cat", Parsons added the saxophone part and transformed the original folk concept into the jazz-influenced ballad that put Stewart onto the charts.

Parsons also produced three albums by Pilot, a Scottish pop rock band, whose hits included "January" and "Magic". He also mixed the debut album by the American band Ambrosia and produced their second album, Somewhere I've Never Travelled. Parsons was nominated for a Grammy Award for both albums.

In 1975, he declined Pink Floyd's invitation to work on Wish You Were Here – the follow-up to Dark Side – and instead initiated the Alan Parsons Project with producer, songwriter, and occasional singer Eric Woolfson, whom he had met at Abbey Road. The Project consisted of a revolving group of studio musicians and vocalists, most notably the members of Pilot and (on the first album) the members of Ambrosia. Unlike most rock groups, the Alan Parsons Project never performed live during its heyday, although it did release several music videos. Its only live performance during its original incarnation was in 1990. It released ten albums, the last in 1987. The Project terminated in 1990 after Parsons and Woolfson split, with the Project's intended 11th album released that year as a Woolfson solo album. Parsons continued to release work in his own name and in collaboration with other musicians. Parsons and his band regularly toured many parts of the world.

Although an accomplished vocalist, keyboardist, bassist, guitarist and flautist, Parsons only sang infrequent and incidental parts on his albums, such as the background vocals on "Time". While his keyboard playing was very audible on the Alan Parsons Project albums, very few recordings feature his flute. He briefly returned to run Abbey Road Studios in its entirety. Parsons also continued with his selective production work for other bands.

Of all his collaborators, guitarist Ian Bairnson worked with Parsons the longest, including Parsons' post-Project albums: Try Anything Once, On Air, The Time Machine and The Secret.

Chris Thompson joined Alan Parsons' band for his first solo album after the split of The Alan Parsons Project and was also one of the two frontmen on the ensuing tour, which was captured on the album Alan Parsons Live. For the U.S. release of this album in 1995 (retitled The Very Best Live), the band added three new studio recordings, recorded in February 1995. One of these was "You're the Voice", which marked the first time a version featuring the original songwriter (Thompson) had been released. "You're the Voice" was then performed at the World Liberty Concert in May 1995 by The Alan Parsons Band, Chris Thompson, and Metropole Orkest. The only official release associated with that concert was a single, featuring a radio edit of the live version of "You're the Voice" (faded out after four minutes). The B-side was a live recording of "White Dawn", which was performed by the Metropole Orkest and Gelders Opera and Operetta Gezelschap (GOOG) choir. The song was arranged by Andrew Powell and conducted by Dick Bakker.

In 1998, Parsons became vice-president of EMI Studios Group, including the Abbey Road Studios. He soon left the post, deciding to return to more creative endeavours. Parsons remained as a creative consultant and associate producer for the group.

As well as receiving gold and platinum awards from many nations, Parsons has received thirteen Grammy Award nominations. In 2006, he was nominated for Best Surround Sound Album for A Valid Path. In 2019, he won his first Grammy Award for Best immersive Audio Album for his remastered 35th anniversary edition of Eye in the Sky.

Beginning in 2001 and extending for four years, Parsons led a Beatles tribute show called A Walk Down Abbey Road featuring performers such as Todd Rundgren, Ann Wilson of Heart, John Entwistle of the Who and Jack Bruce of Cream. The show structure included a first set where all the musicians assembled to perform each other's hits, and a second set featuring all Beatles songs.

Since 1999, he has toured as the Alan Parsons Live Project (with Woolfson's permission). The band currently features lead singer P. J. Olsson, guitarist Jeff Kollman, drummer Danny Thompson, keyboardist Tom Brooks, bass guitarist Guy Erez, vocalist and saxophonist Todd Cooper, guitarist and vocalist Dan Tracey, along with Parsons on rhythm guitar, keyboards and vocals. This band performed live in Medellín, Colombia, in 2013 as Alan Parsons Symphonic Project in a performance recorded for Colombian television and also released on CD (live 2-CD) and DVD (May 2016).

In May 2005, Parsons appeared at the Canyon Club in Agoura Hills, California, to mix front-of-house sound for Southern California-based Pink Floyd tribute band Which One's Pink? as they performed The Dark Side of the Moon in its entirety.

In 2010, Parsons released his single "All Our Yesterdays" through Authentik Artists. Parsons also launched a DVD educational series in 2010, titled The Art and Science of Sound Recording (ASSR) on music production and the complete audio recording process. The single "All Our Yesterdays" was written and recorded during the making of ASSR. The series, narrated by Billy Bob Thornton, gives detailed tutorials on virtually every aspect of the sound recording process.

During 2010, several media reports (one of which included a quote from a representative of Parsons), alleged that the song "Need You Now" by country music group Lady Antebellum used the melody and arrangement of "Eye in the Sky".

Parsons produced Jake Shimabukuro's album Grand Ukulele, which was released on 2 October 2012. Also in 2012, he contributed lead vocals and performed keyboards and guitar on the track "Precious Life" by German electronic music duo Lichtmond, and appeared with many other noted progressive-rock musicians on The Prog Collective album by Billy Sherwood, singing lead on "The Technical Divide".

Parsons engineered the third solo album by Steven Wilson, The Raven that Refused to Sing (And Other Stories), released on 25 February 2013.

In late 2013, a live album recorded on tour in Germany and Austria with the title LiveSpan was released, accompanied by a single called "Fragile" with Simon Philips on drums.

In 2017, Parsons was credited with producing three of the 13 tracks on Blackfield V, the fifth studio album by Blackfield, a British-Israeli musical project formed by Aviv Geffen and Steven Wilson.

Legacy Recordings, the catalogue division of Sony Music Entertainment, celebrated the 35th anniversary of Eye in the Sky with the worldwide release of a definitive deluxe collector's box set, featuring rare and unreleased material, on 17 November 2017.

On 19 July 2018, Parsons and engineer Noah Bruskin opened a new recording studio, ParSonics. ParSonics was used in the recording of Alan Parsons’ album, The Secret.

On 26 April 2019, Parsons released a new studio album, The Secret, his first album in 15 years.

In February 2022, Parsons performed and recorded a symphonic concert in Tel Aviv with the Israel Philharmonic Orchestra, released as the live album One Note Symphony: Live in Tel Aviv.

On 15 July 2022, Parsons released a new studio album, From the New World.

== Band members ==
Current

- Alan Parsons – guitar, vocals, keyboards, percussion (1993–present)
- P. J. Olsson – lead vocals (2004–present)
- Guy Erez – bass (2010–present)
- Todd Cooper – vocals, saxophone (2010–present)
- Danny Thompson - drums (2010–present)
- Tom Brooks – keyboards, backing vocals (2012–present)
- Dan Tracey – guitar, vocals (2016–present)
- Jeff Kollman – lead guitar, vocals (2017–present)

Former

- Ian Bairnson – lead guitar, saxophone (1993–2000; died 2023)
- Stuart Elliott – drums (1993–2000)
- Richard Cottle – keyboards, saxophone (1994–1995)
- Gary Howard – vocals, guitar (1994)
- Chris Thompson – vocals, guitar, percussion (1994–1995)
- Andrew Powell – keyboards (1994–1995)
- Jeremy Meek – bass, vocals (1994)
- Peter Beckett – vocals, keyboards (1995–1998)
- Felix Krish – bass (1995)
- John Giblin – bass (1996–1998; died 2023)
- Gary Sanctuary – keyboards (1996)
- Neil Lockwood – vocals, guitar (1996–2000; died 2025)
- John Beck – keyboards (1997–2002, 2005)
- Dick Nolan – bass (1999–2000)
- David Pack – vocals, guitar (1999; select shows, 2001)
- Tony Hadley – vocals (1999; European legs)
- Godfrey Townsend – guitar (2001–2009)
- Todd Rundgren – vocals, guitar (2001–2002)
- Ann Wilson – vocals, guitar (2001)
- John Entwistle – bass, vocals (2001; died 2002)
- Steve Loungo – drums (2001)
- Christopher Cross – vocals, guitar (2002–2003)
- Jack Bruce – bass, vocals (2002–2003; died 2014)
- Mark Farner – vocals, guitar (2002–2003)
- Steve Murphy – drums (2002–2003)
- Manny Focarazzo – keyboards (2003–2014)
- John Montagna – bass (2003–2009)
- Kip Winger – vocals (2005, 2007)
- Alastair Greene – guitar (2010–2015)

== Family and personal life ==
His father was Denys Parsons, the grandson of the actor Herbert Beerbohm Tree. Denys Parsons was a scientist, a filmmaker, and the press officer for the British Library, as well as a talented pianist and flautist. He developed the Parsons Code as a means of classifying musical melody and was the author of The Directory of Tunes and Musical Themes (1975, revised 2008).

Parsons resides in Santa Barbara, California, US. He has two sons from his first marriage. He is married to Lisa Griffiths; they have two daughters.

== Discography ==
Date	Title	Label	Charted	Country	Catalog number
as part of The Alan Parsons Project
May 1976	Tales of Mystery and Imagination	Charisma/20th Century	38	US	
June 1977	I Robot	Arista	9	US	SPARTY 1012
June 1978	Pyramid	Arista	26	US	
August 1979	Eve	Arista	13	US	
November 1980	The Turn of a Friendly Card	Arista	13	US	AL 9518 (US LP) ARCD 8226 (US CD)
June 1982	Eye in the Sky	Arista	7	US	
1983	The Best of the Alan Parsons Project	Arista	53	US	
February 1984	Ammonia Avenue	Arista	15	US	
February 1985	Vulture Culture	Arista	46	US	
November 1985	Stereotomy	Arista	43	US	
January 1987	Gaudi	Arista	57	US	
1988	The Best of the Alan Parsons Project, Vol. 2	Arista	–	–	
1988	The Instrumental Works	Arista	–	–	
1990	Freudiana	EMI	–	–	
9 October 1989	Pop Classics	Arista	–	–	
1995 (6/2004)	Extended Versions: The Encore Collection Live		–	–	
15 July 1997	The Definitive Collection		–	–	
27 July 1999	Master Hits - The Alan Parsons Project		–	–	
2 August 1999	Alan Parsons Project - Greatest Hits Live = Best of Live		–	–	
3 August 1999	Eye in the Sky – Encore Collection		–	–	
9 May 2000	Alan Parsons Project - Gold Collection	BMG International	–	–	
22 August 2002	Works	Audiophile Legends	–	–	
23 March 2004	Ultimate		–	–	
2006	Days Are Numbers	Arista	–	–	88697016972
2007	The Essential (2 CD compilation)	Arista / Legacy	–	–	88697043372
2010	The Collection	Sony / Camden			88697808482
23 March 2014	The Sicilian Defence (part of The Complete Albums Collection)	Arista / Sony	–	–	88697890552-11
as solo artist – studio albums
26 October 1993	Try Anything Once	Arista	122	US	
24 September 1996	On Air	A&M/Digital Sound/River North	78	US	
28 September 1999	The Time Machine	Miramar	71	US	
24 August 2004	A Valid Path	Artemis	34	US	
26 April 2019	The Secret	Frontiers		US	
15 July 2022	From the New World	Frontiers		US	
as solo artist – live albums
27 June 1995	The Very Best Live	RCA	–	–	
6 April 2010	Eye 2 Eye: Live in Madrid	Frontiers			
Sept 2013	Alan Parsons LiveSpan	MFP			
June 2016	Alan Parsons Symphonic Project, Live in Colombia	earMusic			
5 November 2021	The Neverending Show - Live in The Netherlands	Frontiers			
11 February 2022	One Note Symphony – Live In Tel Aviv	Frontiers			
as solo artist – singles
15 June 2010	All Our Yesterdays / Alpha Centauri (2010)	Authentik Artists, Inc.			
3 April 2014	Fragile / Luciferama	Mfp Music Productions			
10 April 2015	Do You Live at All				
as engineer
1969	Abbey Road (The Beatles)	Apple	1	UK; US	
1970	Let It Be (The Beatles)	Apple	1	UK US	
1970	Atom Heart Mother (Pink Floyd)	Harvest	1; 55	UK; US	
1971	Stormcock (Roy Harper)	Harvest			
1971	Wild Life (Wings)	Apple	10; 11	US; UK	
1973	The Dark Side of the Moon (Pink Floyd)	Harvest	2; 1	UK; US	
1973	Wizzard Brew (Wizzard) (Partial)	Harvest	29	UK	
1973	Red Rose Speedway (Paul McCartney and Wings)	Apple	1; 5	US; UK	
1973	Boulders (Roy Wood) (Partial)	Harvest	15	UK	
1974	Hollies (The Hollies)	Polydor (UK), Epic (US)	28	US	
1975	Another Night (The Hollies)		132	US	
1975	Ambrosia (Ambrosia)	20th Century	22	US	
1976	Year of the Cat (Al Stewart)		5	US	
1978	Time Passages (Al Stewart)		10	US	
2013	The Raven That Refused to Sing (And Other Stories) (Steven Wilson)	Kscope	28	UK	
as producer
1974	From the Album of the Same Name (Pilot)	EMI			
1974	The Psychomodo (Cockney Rebel)	EMI			
1975	The Best Years of Our Lives (Steve Harley & Cockney Rebel)		–	–	
1975	Second Flight (Pilot)				
1975	Modern Times (Al Stewart)				
1976	Rebel (John Miles)		171	US	
1976	Year of the Cat (Al Stewart)		5	US	
1976	Somewhere I've Never Travelled (Ambrosia)	20th Century	79	US	
1978	Time Passages (Al Stewart)		10	US	
1979	Lenny Zakatek (Lenny Zakatek)	A&M		US	
March 1984	Keats (Keats)	EMI			
1985	Ladyhawke (OST by Andrew Powell)	Atlantic Records			
1993	Symphonic Music of Yes	RCA			
2012	Grand Ukulele (Jake Shimabukuro)	Mailboat Records			
2017	Blackfield V (Blackfield)	Kscope		UK, Israel	
2019	Jonathan Cilia Faro (Grown up Christmas List)	NewArias Production		USA, Italy	
as executive producer / mentor
1999	Turning the Tide (Iconic Phare)	Carrera Records	–	–	

=== Billboard Top 40 hit singles (US) ===
- 1976 – "(The System of) Doctor Tarr and Professor Fether" – No. 37
- 1977 – "I Wouldn't Want to Be Like You" – No. 36
- 1979 – "Damned If I Do" – No. 27
- 1980 – "Games People Play" – No. 16
- 1981 – "Time" – No. 15
- 1982 – "Eye in the Sky" – No. 3
- 1984 – "Don't Answer Me" – No. 15
- 1984 – "Prime Time" – No. 34

=== Canadian singles ===
- 1976 – "(The System of) Doctor Tarr and Professor Fether" – No. 62
- 1977 – "I Wouldn't Want to Be Like You" – No. 22
- 1980 – "Damned If I Do" – No. 16
- 1981 – "Games People Play" – No. 9
- 1981 – "Time" – No. 30
- 1982 – "Eye in the Sky" – No. 1
- 1983 – "You Don't Believe" – No. 43
- 1984 – "Don't Answer Me" – No. 20
- 1985 – "Let's Talk About Me" – No. 89

== Honours and awards ==
Parsons was appointed Officer of the Order of the British Empire (OBE) in the 2021 Birthday Honours for services to music and music production.

=== Nominations ===
- 1973 – Pink Floyd – Dark Side of the Moon – Grammy Nomination for Best Engineered Album, Non-Classical
- 1975 – Ambrosia – Ambrosia – Grammy Nomination for Best Engineered Album, Non-Classical
- 1976 – Ambrosia – Somewhere I've Never Travelled – Grammy Nomination for Best Engineered Album, Non-Classical
- 1976 – The Alan Parsons Project – Tales of Mystery and Imagination – Grammy Nomination for Best Engineered Album, Non-Classical
- 1978 – The Alan Parsons Project – Pyramid – Grammy Nomination for Best Engineered Album, Non-Classical
- 1978 – Alan Parsons – Producer of the Year, Grammy Nomination for Producer of the Year
- 1979 – Ice Castles – Original Motion Picture Soundtrack – Grammy Nomination for Best Album of Original Score Written for a Motion Picture
- 1979 – The Alan Parsons Project – Eve – Grammy Nomination for Best Engineered Album, Non-Classical
- 1981 – The Alan Parsons Project – The Turn of a Friendly Card – Grammy Nomination for Best Engineered Album, Non-Classical
- 1982 – The Alan Parsons Project – Eye in the Sky – Grammy Nomination for Best Engineered Album, Non-Classical
- 1986 – The Alan Parsons Project – "Where's The Walrus?" – Grammy Nomination for Best Rock Instrumental Performance
- 2007 – Alan Parsons – A Valid Path – Grammy Nomination for Best Surround Sound Album
- 2018 – Alan Parsons, Dave Donnelly, & PJ Olsson – "Eye in the Sky – 35th Anniversary Edition" – Grammy Award for Best Immersive Audio Album – Alan Parsons, surround mix engineer; surround mastering engineers; Alan Parsons, surround producer (The Alan Parsons Project)
