= John Miles discography =

- Studio albums: 10
- Live albums: 2
- Compilation albums: 5
- Singles: 18

This is the discography of English musician John Miles (1949–2021). Over the years he released ten studio albums, two live albums, five compilation albums and eighteen singles.

== Albums ==
=== Studio albums ===
Year	Title	Peak chart positions							Certifications
Year	Title	SWI	NOR	SWE	UK	US	AUS	CAN	Certifications
1976	Rebel	—	—	25	9	171	33	34	BPI: Silver
1977	Stranger in the City	—	15	13	37	93	—	82	BPI: Silver
1978	Zaragon	—	3	3	43	—	—	—	
1979	More Miles Per Hour	—	6	10	46	—	—	—	
1980	Sympathy	—	—	—	—	—	—	—	
1981	Miles High	—	—	28	96	—	—	—	
1983	Play On	—	—	29	—	—	—	—	
1985	Transition	—	—	—	—	—	—	—	
1993	Upfront	26	—	—	—	—	—	—	
1999	Tom and Catherine	—	—	—	—	—	—	—	
"—" denotes releases that did not chart

=== Live albums ===
Year	Title
1992	John Miles in Concert
2009	The Best of John Miles at the Night of the Proms

=== Compilation albums ===
Year	Title
1982	John Miles' Music
1993	Anthology
1999	Millennium Edition
2000	John Miles His Very Best
2016	John Miles - The Decca Albums
2024	John Miles -The Albums 1983 -1993

== Singles ==
Year	Title	Peak chart positions						Certifications	Album
Year	Title	SWI	NLD	UK	US	AUS	CAN	Certifications	Album
1975	"Highfly"	—	—	17	68	—	74		Rebel
1976	"Music"	4	1	3	88	38	—	BPI: Silver	Rebel
1976	"Slow Down"	—	—	10	34	—	68		Stranger in the City
1976	"Remember Yesterday"	—	—	32	—	—	—		Stranger in the City
1976	"Manhattan Skyline"	—	—	—	—	—	—		Stranger in the City
1978	"No Hard Feelings"	—	—	—	—	—	—		Zaragon
1979	"Can't Keep a Good Man Down"	—	—	—	—	—	—		More Miles Per Hour
1979	"Oh Dear"	—	—	—	—	—	—		More Miles Per Hour
1979	"(Don't Give Me Your) Sympathy"	—	—	—	—	—	—		More Miles Per Hour
1981	"Turn Yourself Loose"	—	—	—	—	—	—		Miles High
1981	"Reggae Man"	—	—	—	—	—	—		Miles High
1983	"The Right to Sing"	—	—	88	—	—	—		Play On
1983	"Song for You"	—	—	—	—	—	23		Play On
1985	"Blinded"	—	—	—	—	—	—		Transition
1985	"I Need Your Love"	—	—	—	—	—	—		Transition
1993	"One More Day Without Love"	—	—	—	—	—	—		Upfront
1993	"What Goes Around"	—	—	—	—	—	—		Upfront
1994	"Oh How the Years Go By"	—	—	—	—	—	—		Upfront
"—" denotes releases that did not chart
