= E.J. Phillips =

British Pentecostal minister and denominational administrator (1893–1973)

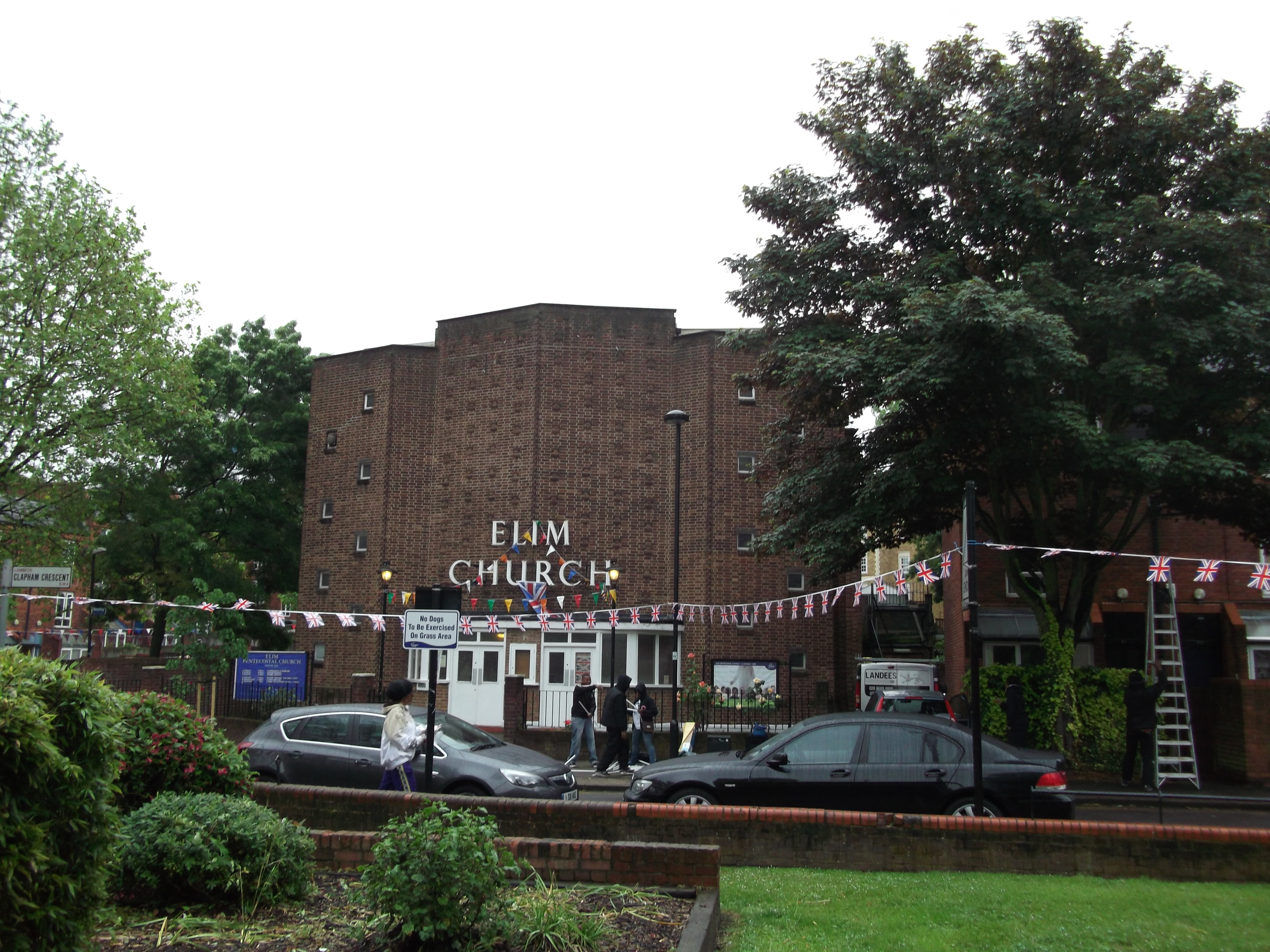
Elim Pentecostal Church in Clapham, the hub of the Pentecostal denomination Phillips helped found

Ernest John "E.J." Phillips (1893–1973) was a British Pentecostal minister and denominational administrator. He was one of the foundational figures in the Elim Pentecostal Church denomination, serving as its first secretary general, and later as president.

== Early life and family ==
Phillips came from a family committed to Pentecostal ministry. His niece Dorothy "Dollie" Phillips became Elim’s first missionary in 1919, travelling to India to share the gospel, while his brother Hubert Cyril Phillips pioneered Elim’s work in South Africa beginning in 1928. Another family member, F.B. Phillips, was involved with the movement’s publishing endeavours, printing the inaugural Elim Evangel in December 1919.

Phillips became a student at the Pentecostal Missionary Union Bible College in Preston in 1912, at the same time as George Jeffreys.

== Establishment of Elim Church ==
Phillips first met with George Jeffreys, Elim's founder, in 1912, when Jeffreys attended the Pentecostal Training School at Preston for six weeks. It was in 1919 that Phillips joined the Elim Evangelistic Band, Jeffreys' missionary organisation, that had been established in 1915. He became the Secretary General of the movement in August 1923, and the director of the publishing house and president of the Crusader youth movement in 1924. The publishing company began producing the Elim Evangel, the movement’s official publication that served to unite the emerging network of churches with shared identity and mission. In 1922 he became the joint editor of the Evangel, and remained the joint or sometimes sole editor of the publication until 1930.

In November 1924, Phillips collaborated with George Jeffreys and others to establish the Elim Bible College at Clapham and became its dean from 1926-1927. This Bible college, which trained ministers and missionaries, would eventually become Regents Theological College.

When the movement formally incorporated its deed poll in April 1934, restructuring from the Elim Evangelistic Band into the Elim Foursquare Gospel Alliance, an executive council of nine men was appointed to govern the Movement. George Jeffreys remained as principal, while Phillips was retained in office in his role as secretary general. This constitutional arrangement placed valuable property and organisational assets under the executive council’s legal control.

== Schism ==
By 1939, tensions between principal George Jeffreys and the more administratively-minded Phillips had become irreconcilable. The core disagreement centred on governance and church polity rather than theology. Jeffreys increasingly advocated for stronger local church autonomy, fearing that the centralised administration overseen by Phillips and the executive council posed a threat to individual congregational independence. Jeffreys also championed British Israelism, a theological position that Phillips and the executive council opposed, and some suggest that the shift in position on polity by Jeffreys (who had established the original rules) was born out of a desire that individual congregations should accept the British Israelism identity that had been rejected by the executive council and conference.

After policy decisions Jeffreys desired were rejected by the ministers within the denomination, he resigned in December 1939, briefly returned, then resigned permanently in 1940 to form the Bible-Pattern Church Fellowship in Nottingham. This split proved unique within Pentecostalism, where the founder resigned and established a rival denomination.

== Following Jeffreys ==
Following Jeffreys’ departure, Phillips remained as the de facto administrative leader of Elim, continuing as the secretary general and principal architect of its continued organisational structure, while George Kingston, a wealthy businessman who had founded many Essex Elim congregations, assumed the presidency. Under Phillips’ continued administration, Elim navigated the postwar years successfully despite the loss of its founder.

Phillips became the president of Elim for the year from 1958 to 1959, which had after 1945 become a one-year appointment. He was succeeded in the role by H. Burton-Haynes, handing it over during the 1959 Llandudno conference.

== Death ==
Phillips died in 1973, having served as secretary general and executive architect of Elim for nearly five decades. Throughout his tenure, he transformed Elim from an informal revival band into a structured, institutionalised Pentecostal denomination with constitutions, property holdings, educational institutions, and publishing operations.

== Legacy ==
The structures Phillips built: the Bible college (Regents Theological College), the publishing house, the centralised governance through the executive council, and the missionary infrastructure, became the foundation upon which modern Elim continues to operate. As of 1999, Elim comprised over 650 churches in the UK and Ireland, with approximately 9,000 churches worldwide.

== Bibliography ==
- "Estuary Elim: Our History". www.estuaryelim.church.
- Gee, Donald (1941). The Pentecostal Movement. Elim Publishing.
- Hudson, David Neil (1999). A schism and its aftermath : an historical analysis of denominational discerption in the Elim Pentecostal Church, 1939-1940 (Ph.D. thesis). King's College London.
- Jones, Maldwyn (21 May 2021). And They Came to Elim: An Official History of the Elim Pentecostal Movement in the UK. Instant Apostle. ISBN 9781912726387.
- Jones, Maldwyn (2 May 2023). And the came to Elim, Volume II. Worthing: Verite CM Ltd. ISBN 1914388437.
- Kay, William K. (17 February 2017). George Jeffreys: Pentecostal Apostle and Revivalist (kindle ed.). CPT Press. ISBN 978-1-935931-61-4.
- "1925 – 2025 Celebrating our 100th anniversary – Regents Theological College". Regents Theological College. 2025.
