= Regents Theological College =

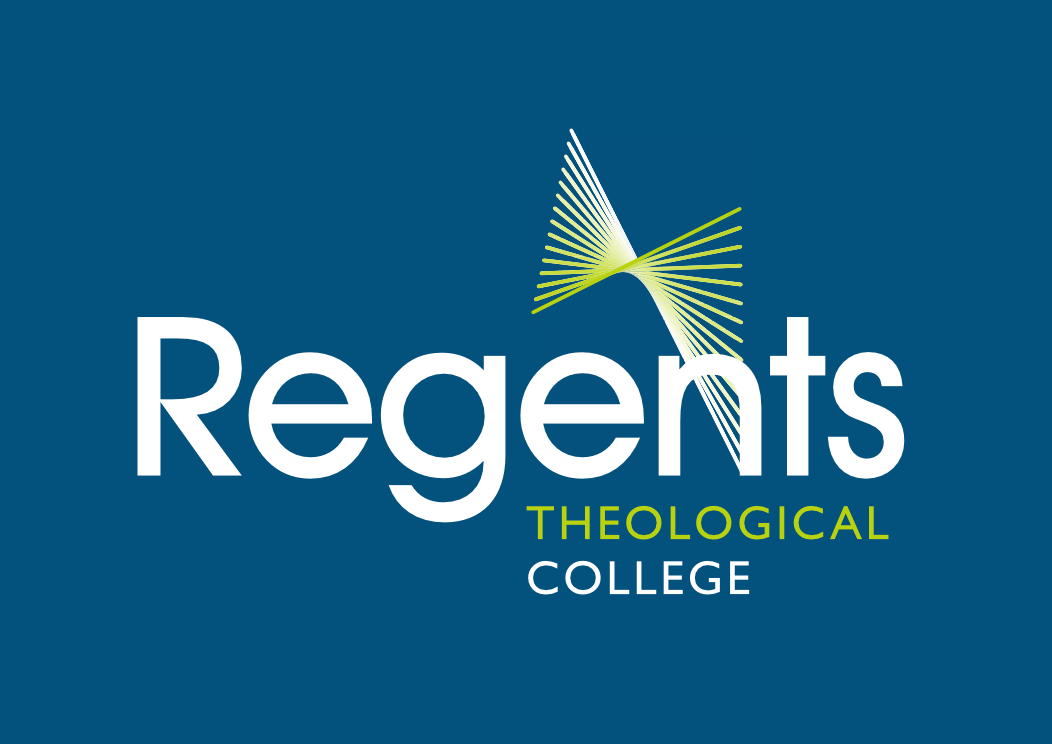

Location
- De Walden Road, West Malvern Road; West Malvern, Worcestershire, WR14 4AY; Great Britain
- 52.113655°N 2.347158°W

Information
- Former name: Elim Bible College
- Type: Theological College
- Religious affiliation: Christianity
- Founder: George Jeffreys
- Principal: Revd Michelle Nunn
- Staff: 19 Residential Teaching Staff and 10 Visiting Teaching Staff
- Gender: Mixed
- Age: 18 to 75
- Enrollment: 180
- Capacity: 200
- Website: www.regents-tc.ac.uk

Regents Theological College is a theological college in Malvern, Worcestershire, England. It is the national training centre of the Elim Pentecostal Church.

Established in 1925 as the Elim Bible College, it was founded by the evangelist George Jeffreys, co-founder and leader of the Elim Pentecostal Churches. It was originally situated in Clapham, London, and later moved to Capel in Surrey. In 1987 it moved again to the former Willaston School, Nantwich, Cheshire in 1987. It became Regents Theological College in 1996.

In the early 1990s the college gained a more academic emphasis, mainly due to the work of American New Testament scholar Siegfried Schatzmann, then a faculty member. The college began offering undergraduate degrees validated by the University of Manchester. Undergraduate and postgraduate degrees are now validated by the University of Chester and doctoral supervision is also offered in partnership with Bangor University under the leadership of Dr Martin Clay.

Although it still offers training for ministry within Elim, the college has students from evangelical and charismatic Christian backgrounds, and free church and parachurch denominations.

The college moved to its current site in Malvern in September 2009.

== The college building (St James' House) ==
St James' House was built c. 1860.

In c. 1890, the property was acquired by Lady Howard de Walden (née Lady Lucy Cavendish-Scott-Bentinck), widow of the 6th Baron Howard de Walden (who had died 1868) and daughter of the 4th Duke of Portland.

Lady Howard de Walden transformed the property (c. 1891) into a vast mansion, with water gardens. Following her death (in 1899), it was sold to a family called Ballard who, in 1902, leased it to a Miss Alice Baird for use as a school for girls. It remained the St James School for Girls until 2006.

The St. James School for Girls was one of a number of schools that merged with the former Malvern Girls' College, forming what is now called Malvern St James. The West Malvern Road site was no longer required, and it was bought in 2007 by the Elim Pentecostal Church, who opened it as their training facility in 2009.

== Funding criticism ==
In March 2026 the National Secular Society stated it would pursue a judicial review of the Office for Students for inadequate handling of complaints against the student funding of a number of bible and theological colleges, including Regents Theological College, for allegedly restricting academic freedom and freedom of expression.

== See also ==
- George Jeffreys (pastor)
- Elim Pentecostal Church
- Malvern St James
