= Kensington Temple =

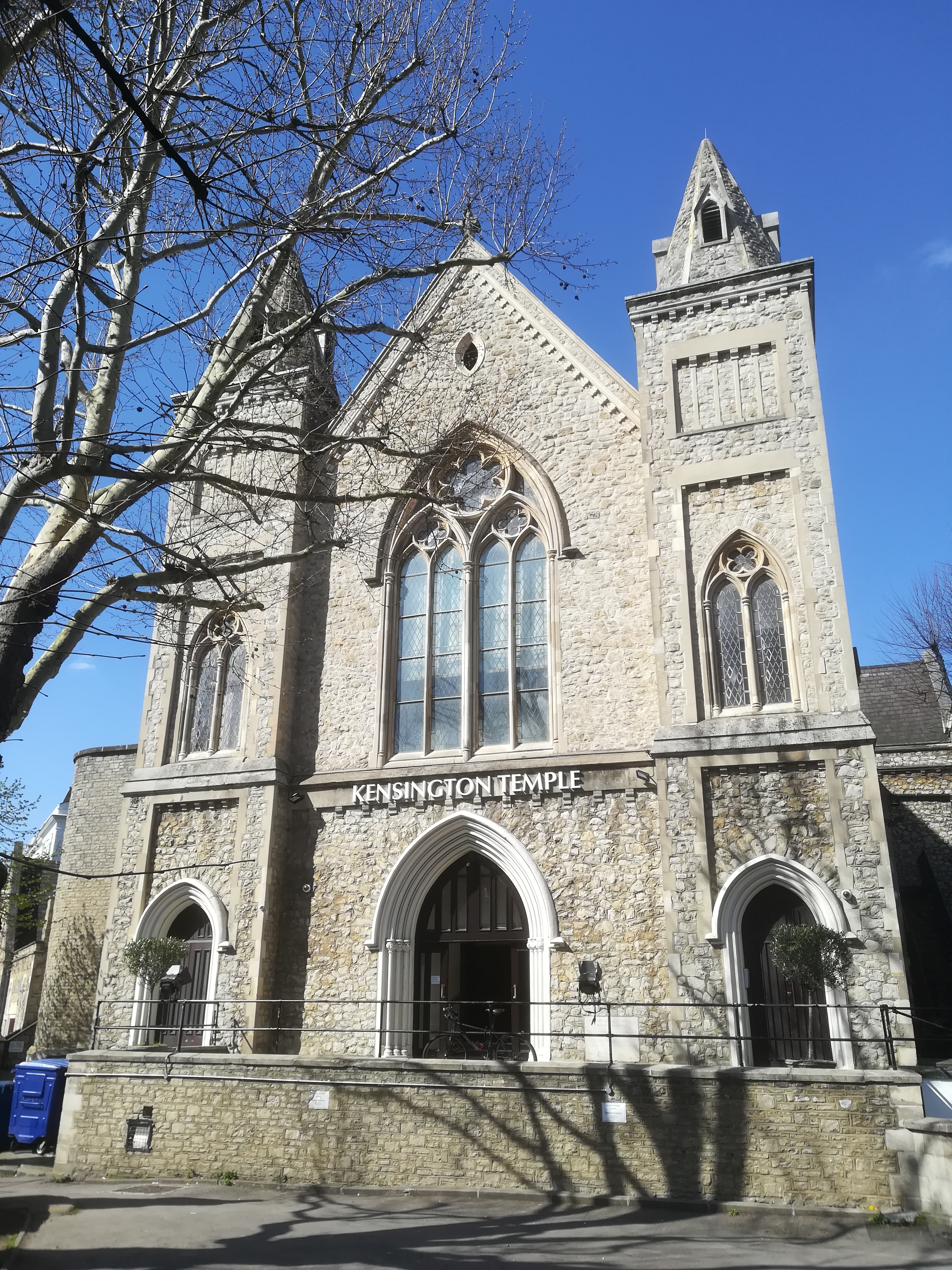
- Kensington Temple
- Kensington Temple
- Location: Notting Hill, London
- Country: England
- Denomination: Elim Pentecostal Church, Evangelical Pentecostal

History
- Founded: 1930
- Founder: George Jeffreys

Kensington Temple is a Pentecostal Church in the Notting Hill area of London, England. It is the largest church in its denomination, the Elim Pentecostal Church.

== History ==
The present church building was founded on 20 August 1848 to help the poor of Notting Hill Vale, by the nearby Congregational church in Hornton Street. It was named for one of its founders as Horbury Chapel. The church was opened in 1849, but by the 1920s a sharp fall in the congregation led to its closure. The building was purchased in 1930 by George Jeffreys. who renamed it Kensington Temple. The official opening was on 31 July 1931, and it would come to replace Clapham as Elim's flagship church. Newspapers dubbed it "the Church of the Great Physician" owing to the claims of many miracles of healing that were being reported.

The building was held in trust for Elim by Robert Darragh and James McWhirter, but when Jeffreys resigned from Elim in 1940, the trustees refused to return the building to the Elim Executive Council, who were reluctant to go to law. Along with some other Elim churches, it became part of the Bible-Pattern Church Fellowship that Jeffreys established. This situation persisted until Robert Darragh and George Jeffreys had died, after which McWhirter, the sole trustee, agreed to sell the building back to Elim, despite objections from Bible-Pattern ministers.

In 1965, Elim minister Rev. Eldin Corsie led an Elim congregation back into Kensington Temple. Under his ministry in the late 1960s–1970s the congregation grew to 600, and then to several thousand under Rev. Wynne Lewis (later to become the Elim Church's General Superintendent) during the 1980s.

Since the 1980s, nicknamed by members of the church as 'KT', Kensington Temple has planted 150 churches across London. Today, the wider Kensington Temple London City Church Network includes 26 Network Churches located across Greater London. Over the years, many churches KT has planted have opted to become independent churches or to have an official status as a self-standing Elim church.

In 2000, Kensington Temple began to transition into a cell church, and today it has hundreds of cell groups meeting weekly across London. The same year, KT moved its offices from Tabernacle, an ex-BBC warehouse in North Acton, to Monarch House in North Acton. In 2005, the church moved its offices to Summit House, Hanger Lane, London. Over the years, Kensington Temple has held some of their annual events in large premier venues and conference centres in London including; Royal Albert Hall, Westminster Central Hall, Wembley Conference Centre and Wembley Arena.

Each week, thousands of people attend services in Kensington Temple. The church continues to hold services in Notting Hill, as well as running a Bible School, online learning, rooms to let, a bookshop and a publishing company; Dovewell Communications.

== Theology and ministry ==
Kensington Temple's theology is Pentecostal, emphasizing the work of the Holy Spirit in the life of the church and individuals.

The emphasis of ministry at KT is to equip all Christians to follow Jesus Christ and to grow both individually and collectively to be like him. Much of this equipping happens through cells, small groups that gather throughout the city. During the week, cell groups provide pastoral care, support and training for church members.

The overarching mission is London and the World for Christ.

== Bibliography ==
- Denny, Barbara; Starren, Carolyn (1998). Kensington Past. London, U.K.: Historical Publications. p. 127. ISBN 9780948667503. OCLC 42308455.
- Jones, Maldwyn (2021). And They Came to Elim: An Official History of the Elim Pentecostal Movement in the Uk. Instant Apostle. ISBN 978-1-912726-38-7.
- Jones, Maldwyn (2 May 2023). And the came to Elim, Volume II. Worthing: Verite CM Ltd. ISBN 1914388437.
- Kay, William K. (2007). Apostolic Networks of Britain: New Ways of Being Church. Paternoster. ISBN 978-1-84227-409-5.
- Kay, William K. (2011). Pentecostalism: A Very Short Introduction. Oxford: Oxford University Press. ISBN 978-0-19-957515-2.
- Kay, William K. (17 February 2017). George Jeffreys: Pentecostal Apostle and Revivalist. CPT Press. ISBN 978-1-935931-61-4.
- Thompson, Damian (21 April 2005). Waiting for Antichrist: Charisma and Apocalypse in a Pentecostal Church. Oxford: Oxford University Press. ISBN 978-0-19-517856-2.
