= Miles High =

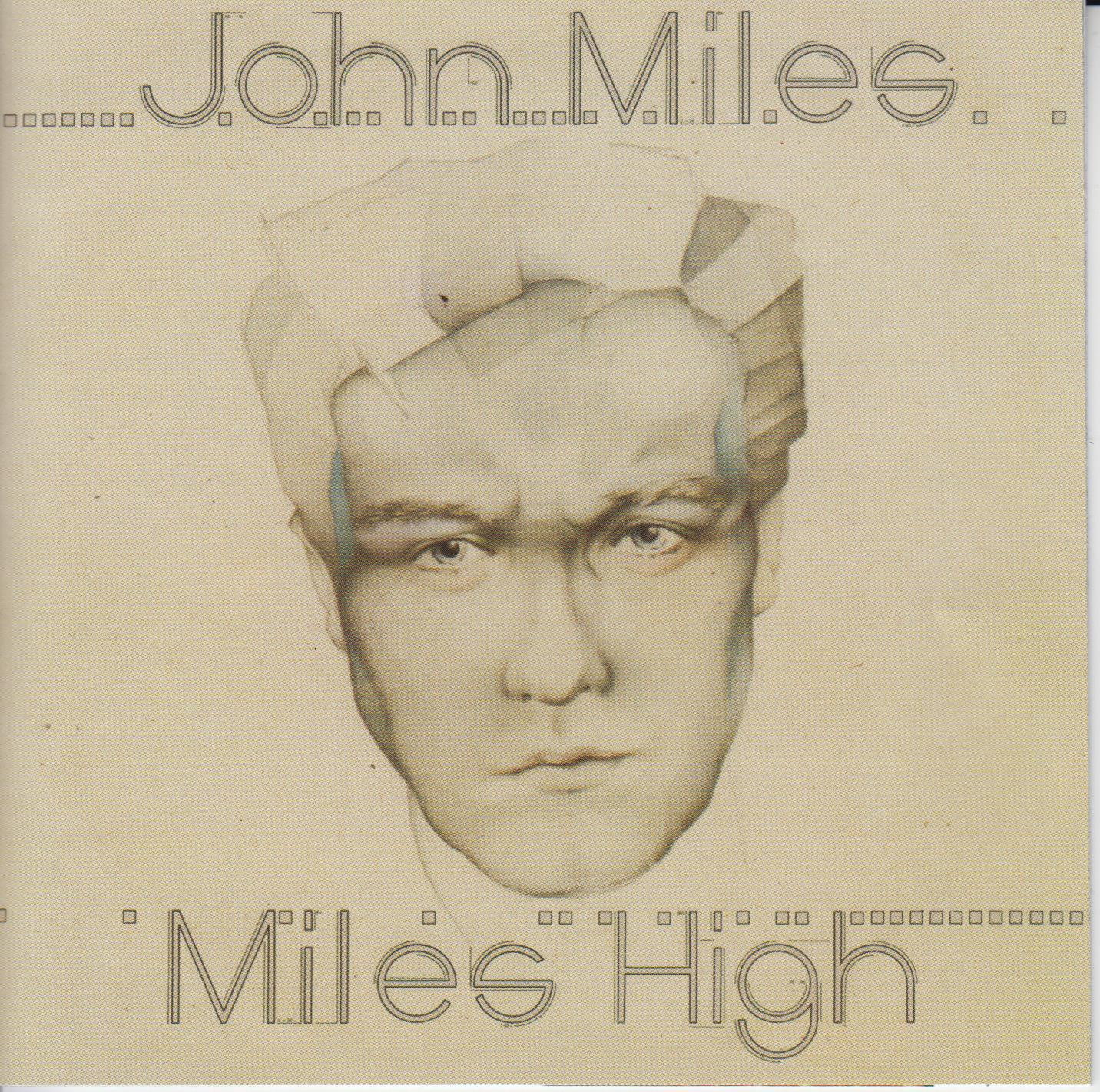

Studio album by John Miles
- Released: 1981
- Recorded: May 1981
- Studio: Pye Studios, London
- Genre: Rock / Pop rock
- Label: EMI (original UK & European release); Harvest (original US & Canadian release); Lemon Recordings (2016 CD reissue)
- Producer: John Miles

John Miles chronology
More Miles Per Hour (1979)	Miles High (1981)	Play On (1983)

Miles High is the fifth solo album by John Miles. It was released in 1981 on the EMI label (EMC 3374), and in January 2016 was reissued for the first time on CD by Lemon Recordings, a subsidiary of Cherry Red Records.

== Overview ==
Miles High was originally released in August 1981 and was John Miles first album for EMI, the previous four all having been released by Decca Records. Miles High peaked at No.96 in the UK album chart and is Miles’ last solo chart entry to date. It was preceded by Sympathy (1980); No. 46), and followed by Play On (1983).

John Miles produced the album, which was recorded at Pye Studios, London, in May 1981 and mastered at Abbey Road Studios in June 1981. Miles was again joined by long-time bassist Bob Marshall and Barry Black on drums, with Brian Chatton (who had joined the band in 1978) on keyboards. All tracks were written by John Miles and Bob Marshall. UK release cover painting (portrait) was by Adrian Baumgartner, sleeve design was by Satori. Early copies released featured a lyric insert.

There was a short 13-date tour of the UK to promote the album.

Miles High was also released domestically in Germany (1C 064-64 504), Italy (3C 064–64504), Netherlands (1C 064-64 504 /CBS 85107), Portugal (11C 078 - 64504), Scandinavia (CBS 40–85107) and Spain (10C 064–064504). The U.S. version was released by Harvest (ST 12172) and came in a totally different cover. For the U.S. version of the album, "Closer to You" replaced "Dancin' for Joy". The running order of the U.S. release also differed from the UK release.

Miles High was available on LP or musicassette; LP only in the U.S.

In November 2015 Cherry Red Records announced that as part of its John Miles reissue campaign on Lemon Recordings, it would be reissuing Miles High. Remastered by Tim Turan, this would be the first time on CD for Miles High. Miles High was released on 29 January 2016.

The Cherry Red/Lemon reissue includes "Closer to You" as a bonus track, and the booklet features both original LP artworks, lyrics to all songs, and liner notes.

== Singles ==
The release of Miles High was preceded by the releases of the single "Turn Yourself Loose" (EMI 5213), although despite quite a lot of airplay, a picture sleeve and signed copies being available, it just failed to break the Top 75 in the UK. The non-album B-side, "Closer to You", was another Miles-Marshall-penned song. "Turn Yourself Loose" was also released in Germany (1C 006 64 512) and in Spain (10C 006 064512), the latter in a unique cover and titled ‘Volviendote A Perder’.

In October 1981 EMI released a second single from the album, "Reggae Man" (EMI 5246), with "One Step Closer to Paradise" selected as the B-side. The single failed to chart. In the U.S., Harvest selected "Don’t Want The Same Things" as the second single (A 5064), with "Reggae Man" selected as the B-side. The single failed to chart.

== Critical reception ==
Reviews of Miles High upon release were mixed, the majority praising Miles’ talent, although some questioned the feel of the album.

Record Mirror commented that the album showed the ‘bland sound of the eighties’, while a Sounds reviewer suggested: ‘John Miles is one of the most talented singers, guitarists and songwriters that I have come across. But this fresh start with EMI is bland, dull and lifeless’. Billboard described Miles High as ‘a classy blending of straight ahead rock, seamless pop, r&b, easy going jazz and reggae’. Melody Maker was even more positive: ‘Gritty, straight ahead Rock and Roll in the Chuck Berry tradition’, concluding their review with; ‘Overall, a triumphant return to the scene by a thoroughbred musician we can ill afford to lose. For all those who love timeless popular music’.

Following the reissue, in Truck & Driver's monthly music reviews (February) a 4 of 5 star concluded with: ‘Sadly, Miles High can be a bit hit & miss. Tracks like "Turn Yourself Loose" & "Don’t Stop Now" plus ballads like "Foolin'" & "Peaceful Waters" are every bit as majestic, powerful and bombastic as anything on Rebel, but the so-called rockers are just too all over the place for my ears (jazz on steroids...). If you like the single "Music", worth buying for the good stuff alone."

== Track listing ==
All tracks written by John Miles and Bob Marshall"

Italicised figures in brackets are U.S. release running order.

1. "Turn Yourself Loose" 3.50 (2)
2. "Don’t Stop Now" 4.49 (3)
3. "Foolin’" 4.30 (8)
4. "Don’t Want the Same Things" 5.36 (4)
5. "Out of the Cradle (But Still Rockin’)" 3.50 (1)
6. "Hold On" 4.26 (6)
7. "Peaceful Waters" 3.42 (10)
8. "Dancin' for Joy" 4.46 ( - )
9. "One Step Closer to Paradise" 4.04 (7)
10. "Reggae Man" 5.30 (5)
11. "Closer to You" 4.49 (9)

Track 11 (which replaced "Dancin' for Joy" on the U.S. release) is a bonus track on Lemon Recordings re-issue

== Personnel ==
- John Miles - lead vocals, keyboards, lead guitar
- Bob Marshall - bass guitar
- Barry Black - drums
- Brian Chatton - keyboards
- Richard Hewson - arrangements on "Don't Want the Same Things", "Out of the Cradle (But Still Rockin')", "Peaceful Waters" and "Dancin' for Joy"

Technical

- Mike Day - recording, mixing
- Satori - sleeve concept, design
- Adrian Baumgartner - cover portrait painting

== Chart positions ==
Year	Chart	Peak position
1981	UK Albums Chart	96
1981	Sweden	28
