= Farah Rumy =

Swiss politician (born 1991)

- ෆාරා රූමි මොහිඩීන් ரூமி முகைதீன்
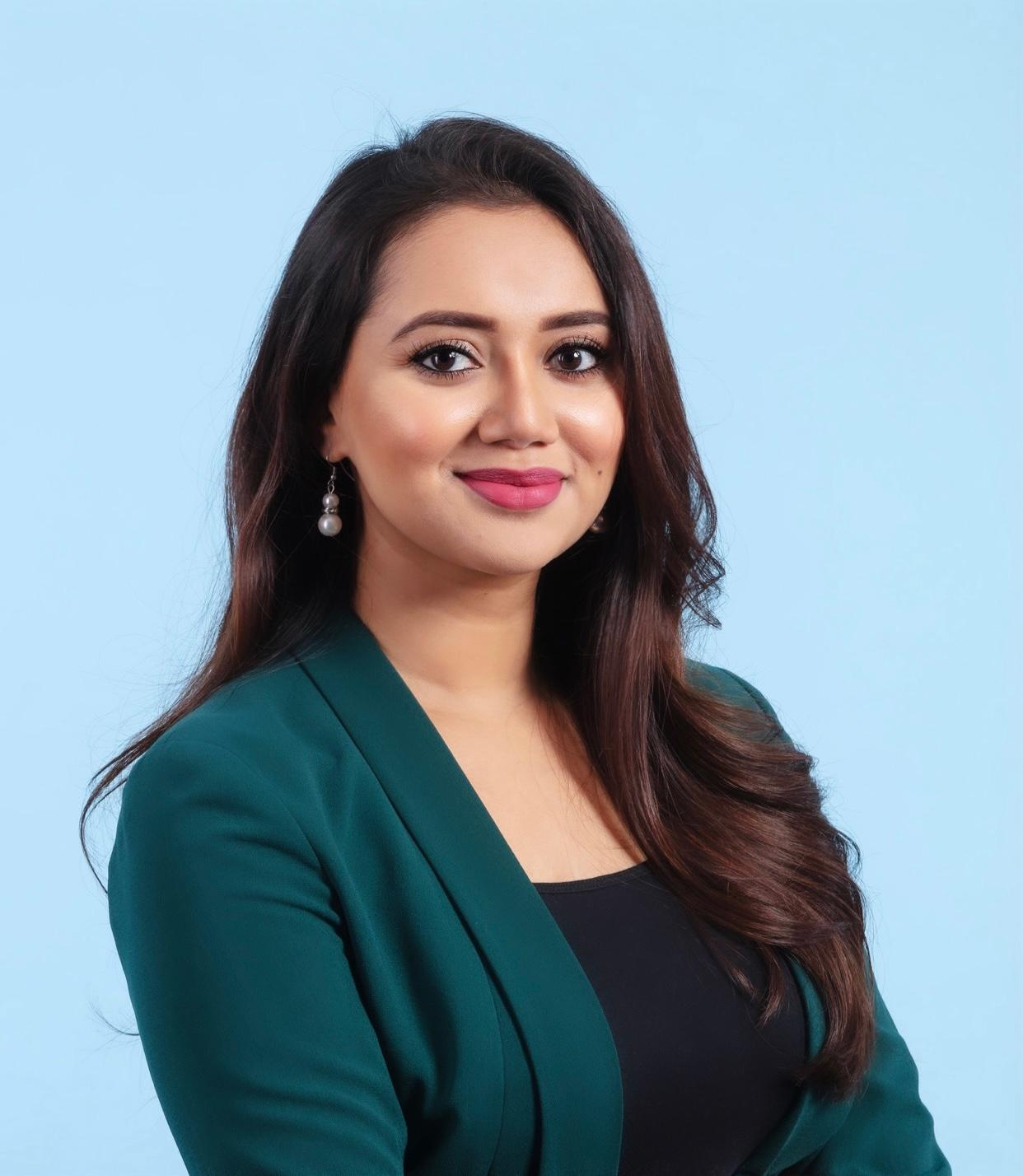

Member of the National Council (Switzerland)
- Incumbent
- Assumed office 4 December 2023
- Preceded by: Franziska Roth
- Constituency: Canton of Solothurn

Member of the Cantonal Council of Solothurn
- In office 7 March 2021 – 3 December 2023

Personal details
- Born: Farah Rumy Mohideen; 28 December 1991 (age 34) Colombo, Western Province, Sri Lanka
- Party: Social Democratic Party
- Occupation: politician, nurse, medical expert and teacher
- Website: https://www.farahrumy.com

Farah Rumy (German pronunciation: [ˈfæɹə ˈɹuːmi]; born 28 December 1991) is a Sri Lankan-born Swiss politician, nurse and medical expert who currently serves on the National Council (Switzerland) for the Social Democratic Party since 2023. She previously served on the Cantonal Council of Solothurn between 2021 and 2023.

Rumy has been an advocate for health and care industry related topics and is the first member of parliament of Sri Lankan descent.

== Early life and education ==
Rumy was born 28 December 1991 in Colombo, Western Province, Sri Lanka.

Initially, she was schooled at Bishop's College, a private Anglican day and boarding school in Colombo. In 1998, aged six, she relocated to Switzerland with her family where she attended public school in Grenchen. After compulsory schooling, Rumy initially completed a nursing apprenticeship before studying for higher academic diplomas in the same field.

== Professional career ==
Rumy worked as a nursing expert and interventional cardiology specialist in the cardiac catheterization laboratory.

Rumy is co-president of the labor union for nursing staff in the Aargau-Solothurn section and works as a teacher at a vocational school.

== Political career ==
Rumy was elected as a member of the Cantonal Council for the Social Democratic Party (SP) of the Canton of Solothurn in 2021.

Previously, Rumy was already engaged in professional and union political activities. Before her candidacy for the Cantonal Council, Rumy joined the SP in 2020, partly due to her experiences in nursing during the COVID-19 pandemic.

After Franziska Roth was re-elected to the National Council in the 2023 Swiss parliamentary elections and won a seat in the second round of the Council of States election, Rumy, as the first alternate, moved up to the National Council and took her place. Consequently, Rumy resigned from the Solothurn Cantonal Parliament at the end of November 2023.

Since then, Rumy has been a member of the Social Democratic parliamentary group of the Swiss Federal Assembly and represents the SP on the Foreign Affairs Committee, as well as serving as an alternate member of the Immunity Committee of the National Council. Her main focus areas in Parliament include health policy, social policy, foreign policy, and equal opportunities. As co-president of the nursing union, Aargau-Solothurn section, she particularly advocates for improving the situation of nursing and the healthcare system. In foreign policy, she has also submitted several legislative initiatives and proposals related to peace and human rights.

Since 2021, Rumy has been a municipal councilor for the city of Grenchen. She is also a member of the Naturalization Commission and a board member of Spitex Grenchen. Additionally, she serves as a member of the foundation board of the Rodania Foundation, which supports people with disabilities. Rumy was also co-president of the SP Migrants of the Canton of Solothurn.

Rumy is the first person of Sri Lankan heritage to be elected to the Swiss Federal Assembly.

In December 2025, Rumy was elected as second vice-president of the National Council, setting her up to become president of the National Council in 2028, if she is reelected in 2027.

== Personal life ==
Rumy lives in Grenchen.

== See also ==
- Farah Rumy on the website of the Federal Assembly
- Website of Farah Rumy
