= Dorothy Fernando =

Sri Lankan artist and illustrator

- Born: Dorothy Dias; September 18, 1907; Panadura
- Died: 1981 (aged 73–74)
- Spouse: Cyril Fernando (died 1955)

Dorothy Fernando (née Dias; 18 September 1907 – 1981) was a Sri Lankan painter.

== Early life ==
Dorothy Dias was born in Panadura. She grew up in Colombo with her conservative parents. She studied at Bishop's College in Colombo and Malvern Girls College in the United Kingdom. In her late teens, she pursued her interest in painting and nature in defiance of her father's wishes.

== Career ==
Fernando became a member of the Ceylon Social Service League, running a sewing school for underprivileged girls for several years. She developed her watercolour painting technique while illustrating the country's indigenous orchids for her brother-in-law Ernest Zoysa.

Fernando travelled during the 1940s, collecting and painting wildflowers. She eventually published a book titled Wildflowers of Ceylon in England in 1954.

== Personal life ==
Dias married Cyril Fernando, who became one of Sri Lanka's most prominent physicians. They had four children. Cyril died in 1955.

Fernando died in 1981 while preparing for her third exhibition.
