= Elim Pentecostal Church =

UK-based Pentecostal Christian denomination

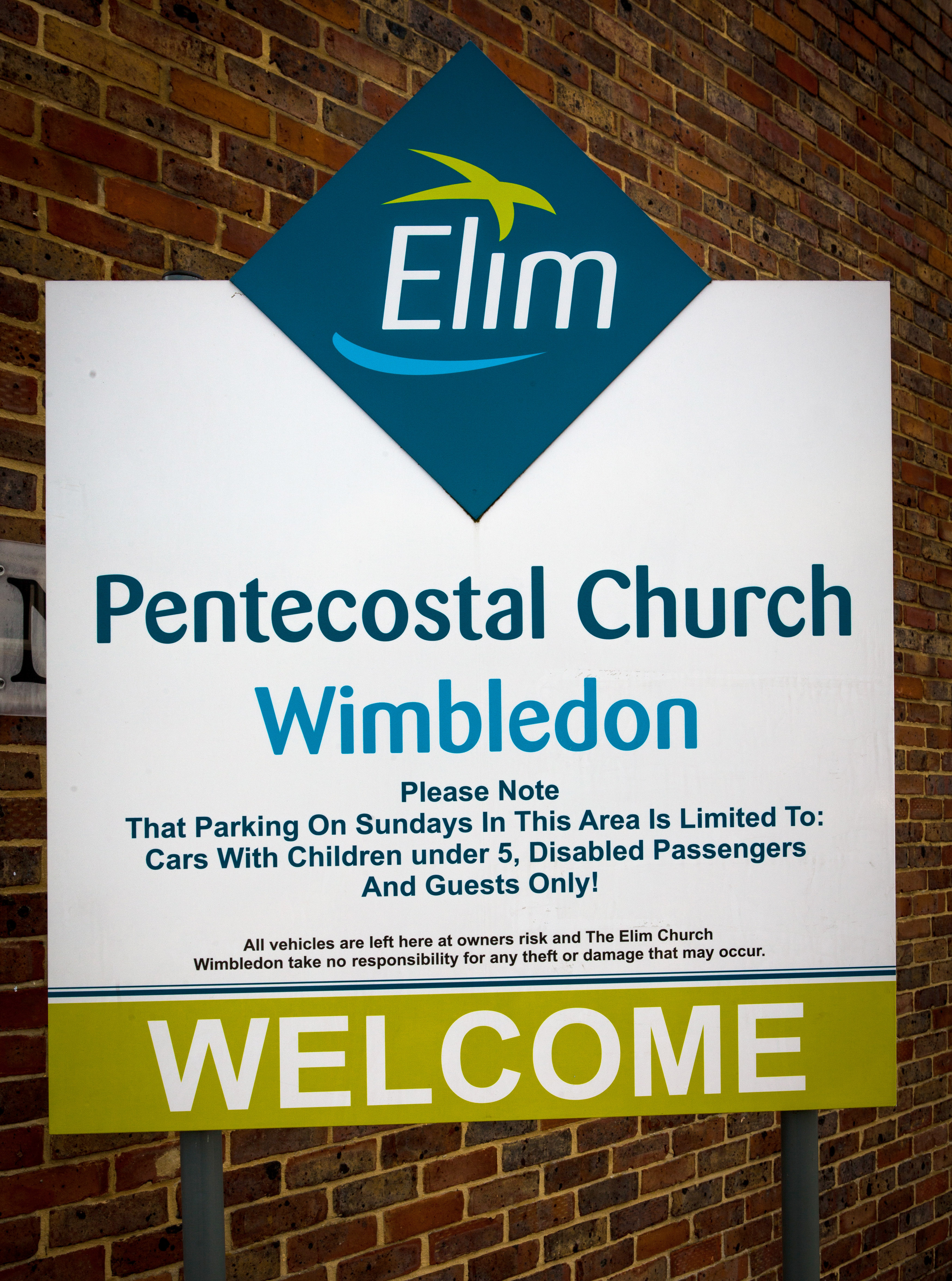
Elim Pentecostal Church Wimbledon

The Elim Pentecostal Church is a UK-based Pentecostal Christian denomination. It was founded in Ireland in 1915 by George Jeffreys and is the second-largest Pentecostal denomination in the UK.

== History ==
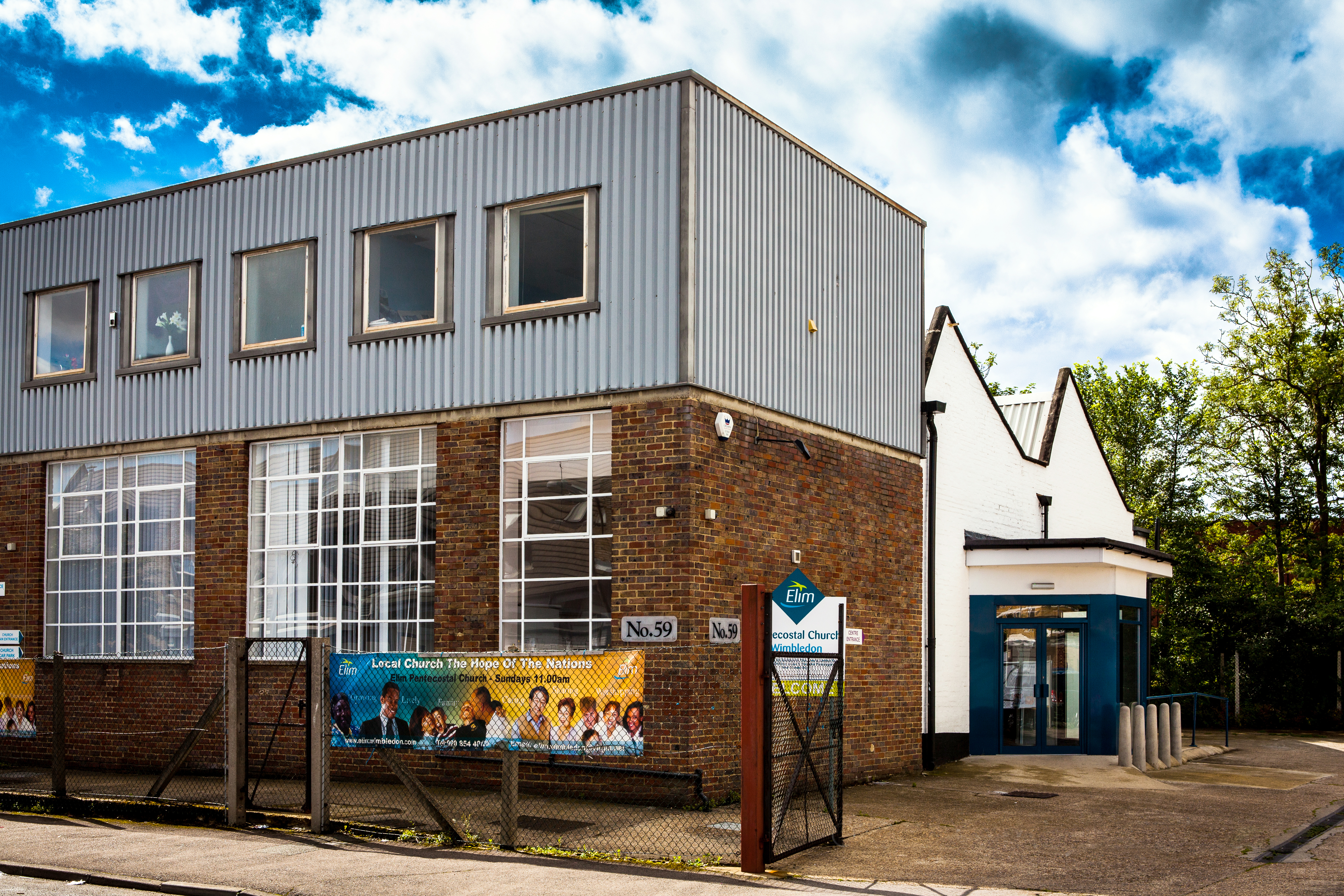
Elim Pentecostal Church, Wimbledon

George Jeffreys (1889–1962) was a Welshman with a Welsh Congregational church background. He was converted at the age of 15 in the Welsh Revival of 1904, after which he and his brother, Stephen, became involved in preaching and evangelism, and were considered revivalists. Alexander A. Boddy, Vicar of All Saints, Monkwearmouth, Sunderland, invited him to preach at his annual Whitsuntide International Pentecostal Convention in Sunderland in May 1913. His preaching came to the notice of William Gillespie who had been involved in the formative work of pentecostalism in Ireland. He invited Jeffreys to join him in Ireland just after Christmas that year and they made the decision that Jeffreys should hold an evangelistic campaign in Monaghan. However, the Monaghan mission was not to open until the summer of 1915, as permission to use the Methodist hall for a Pentecostal assembly was denied. Jeffreys returned to Wales, and also campaigned in England, before returning to Ireland, where he ran a successful campaign for a Pentecostal congregation at Dover Street in Belfast at Christmas in 1914. It was thus in January 1915, when Jeffreys met with seven others, that they came to a resolution that Jeffreys should begin a permanent evangelistic work in Ireland, preaching the full gospel on Pentecostal lines. This work began from a marquee in Monaghan that summer. Jeffreys continued to campaign in England and across Ireland, but the first premises were leased for a church congregation in an old laundry in Hunter Street, Belfast, and this was opened in August 1915. Jeffreys became pastor Jeffreys, and the principal of the movement. The new church was called Elim Christ Church, the first Elim church.

The church was brought together, first as the Elim Evangelistic Band, but this was changed to Elim Foursquare Gospel Alliance when the Deed Poll was registered in April 1934. The name 'Elim' was taken from the account in the Book of Exodus, chapter 15, verse 27, where the Israelites, leaving the bondage of Egypt under the leadership of Moses, found an oasis called Elim: "Then they came to Elim, where there were twelve wells of water and seventy palm trees; so they camped there by the waters." This represented a place of refreshing, and it was thought appropriate for a revival movement at that time.

In 1934, Jeffreys attempted to introduce the teaching of British Israelism into the Elim churches. The matter was debated at the annual ministerial conference between John Leech for the identity and E.J. Phillips against it. This was then followed by a ministerial questions, and a vote, and the resolution was decisively defeated. Following this Jeffreys made attempts to reform church governance. There was suspicion that he wanted congregations to be able to individually decide matters of doctrine as a means of introducing the British Israelism identity, and progress was slow. He resigned from his position as principal of the church in 1939, but was persuaded to return. In May 1940 the conference agreed many changes in governance at his request. After the agreement was reached, in August 1940, Jeffreys made some additional demands, raising concerns over the size of the conference, which he believed could be manipulated. He resigned again in 1940 and formed the Bible-Pattern Church Fellowship, starting in Nottingham, and taking some other Elim congregations with him. Jeffreys and others who left with him held the trusteeship of some of these churches, and refused to sign them over to Elim, as he was legally obliged to do. He then founded other churches throughout England until the 1960s, but in 1986, 24 years after Jeffreys' death, the Nottingham church inducted an Elim pastor and reaffiliated with Elim, and other Bible-pattern churches were reconciled with Elim, although some chose to join the Assemblies of God, and one remained independent. After Jeffreys left, the presidency of Elim initially passed to George Kingston, a wealthy businessman who had founded many of the Elim affiliated congregations in Essex. Kingston held the position from 1940-45, after which the presidency became an annual appointment.

On the night of 23 June 1978, eight British missionaries and four young children (including a three-week-old baby) connected with the Elim mission in Rhodesia (now Zimbabwe) were bayoneted to death by guerrilla fighters in the Vumba massacre. Most of the women were raped. This brutal massacre in the Vumba and the ministry of Elim in Zimbabwe was commemorated in the 2017 book The Axe and the Tree by Stephen Griffiths.

== Doctrine ==
Elim Pentecostal beliefs include the Bible as divinely inspired; the three in one as the Godhead; the virgin birth of Jesus Christ and his complete humanity and sinless life, substitutionary atonement, bodily resurrection, heavenly intercession, the second coming of Jesus; the universal sinfulness of mankind; the work of the Holy Spirit in conviction, repentance, regeneration and sanctification according to Acts 2:38; the baptism of the Holy Spirit "with signs following"; that salvation is received by faith alone and evidenced by the fruit of the Spirit. The baptism of believers by immersion and Communion are held to be ordinances. A distinctive feature of Elim's Pentecostal theology has been the belief that Baptism with the Spirit is followed by signs, but not necessarily the sign of speaking in tongues.

== Organisation ==
Elim represents a global network of about 650 churches in the UK and Ireland, and more than 4000 Elim or Elim affiliated churches overseas, with a weekly attendance of about 50,000 in the UK and more than 300,000 overseas, operating in some 50 countries worldwide. Kensington Temple in London is the largest church in the denomination. Elim missions exist in 35 countries with hospitals, orphanages, and schools. The church operates Regents Theological College in Malvern, Worcestershire, where the movement's headquarters are also based. The authority of governance of the church is rested in the annual conference. Guidance of the denomination is placed in the National Leadership Team and the General Superintendent between sessions. Mark Pugh, Pastor of Rediscover Church in Exeter, is the current General Superintendent of the movement. He took up the role at the 2024 conference from Chris Cartwright his predecessor, who had been in the role since 2016, superseding John Glass. Elim headquarters is in Malvern, alongside its Bible College. Elim became a founding member of the Pentecostal Churches of the United Kingdom in 1998. It has been a member of the Evangelical Alliance for many years. Though the local congregations are commonly and popularly known as Elim Pentecostal Churches, the legal name of the denomination is still Elim Foursquare Gospel Alliance, which is based on the church's stand for four fundamental claims – "Jesus Christ as the Saviour, Healer, Baptizer in the Holy Spirit, and Coming King."

== Hymnal ==
The standard hymnal of the Elim Church was the Redemption Hymnal. Today, however, the music and worship is mainly modern and contemporary worship songs with some traditional hymns alongside. Now Elim has its own Worship Department writing songs and training worship teams called "Elim Sound".

== Churches ==
Many Elim Pentecostal Churches carry the Elim name alongside their location; however, a number of Churches are exceptions to this rule, such as Kensington Temple in London.

== Bibliography ==
- Anderson, Allan H. (24 October 2013). An Introduction to Pentecostalism: Global Charismatic Christianity (2nd ed.). Cambridge University Press. p. 102. ISBN 978-1107660946.
- Gee, Donald (1941). The Pentecostal Movement. Elim Publishing.
- Griffiths, Stephen (2017). The axe and the tree: how bloody persecution sowed the seeds of new life in Zimbabwe (First ed.). Oxford: Monarch Books. ISBN 9780857217899.
- Hudson, David Neil (1999). A schism and its aftermath : an historical analysis of denominational discerption in the Elim Pentecostal Church, 1939-1940 (Ph.D. thesis). King's College London.
- Jones, Maldwyn (21 May 2021). And They Came to Elim: An Official History of the Elim Pentecostal Movement in the UK. Instant Apostle. ISBN 9781912726387.
- Jones, Maldwyn (2 May 2023). And the came to Elim, Volume II. Worthing: Verite CM Ltd. ISBN 1914388437.
- Kay, William K. (17 February 2017). George Jeffreys: Pentecostal Apostle and Revivalist (kindle ed.). CPT Press. ISBN 978-1-935931-61-4.
- Smith, Peter (2006). "Global Warming: The fire of Pentecost in World Evangelism". Elim. Archived from the original on 20 November 2023.
