= Bishop's College (Sri Lanka) =

Bishop's College, Colombo
- College Crest

Location
- 15 Boyd Place; Colombo, 00200; Sri Lanka; 6.9144343°N 79.8533641°E

Information
- Type: Private with day and boarding facilities
- Motto: Latin: Non Sibi Sed Omnibus (Not for self, but for all)
- Religious affiliation: Christianity
- Denomination: Anglican
- Founded: February 1875; 151 years ago
- Founder: James Chapman
- School district: Colombo
- Chairperson: Dushantha Lakshman Rodrigo
- Principal: Chemali G. Herath
- Grades: 1–13; Nursery
- Gender: Female (with males in the Nursery)
- Enrollment: 1,900
- Language: Sinhala; Tamil; English
- Campus type: Urban
- Houses: Henley; Ford; Chapman; Copleston
- Colours: Purple and gold
- Song: "Oba Kithu Gosa Pethirewa"
- Athletics: Yes
- Sports: Water polo; swimming; tennis; table tennis; cricket; diving; chess; basketball; badminton; field hockey
- School hymn: "We build our School on thee, O Lord"
- Website: bishopscollege.lk

Bishop's College in Colombo, Sri Lanka, is a private girls' school founded by the Anglican Church of Ceylon in February 1875.

== Description ==
Bishop's College is a private fee-levying Anglican girls' school in Sri Lanka with about 1900 students in all grades from kindergarten to Grade 14. It is located at 15 Boyd Place, Colombo 3, Sri Lanka. The current principal is Chemali G. Herath.

== History ==
=== Origins (1857–1875) ===
Bishop's College started in 1857 as one of the earliest mission schools of the Church of England in Ceylon, and it was first known as Bishopsgate School. The bishop of Colombo, the Rt. Rev. James Chapman (1845–1862), and his wife Frances were instrumental in setting up the school. Frances had set her heart on setting up a school for Christian girls with funds collected while on furlough in England. In 1857 she established a school in their own residence in Mutwal called Bishopsgate, with the 20 pupils she desired. The principal was a Mrs Long, who had served earlier at the Church Missionary School in Nallur, Jaffna. However, in May 1859, Frances returned to England due to ill health. Long died in 1861, and the school had to be temporarily closed. No reference to its reopening is available in the Diocesan Archives.

=== Reopening (1875–1887) ===
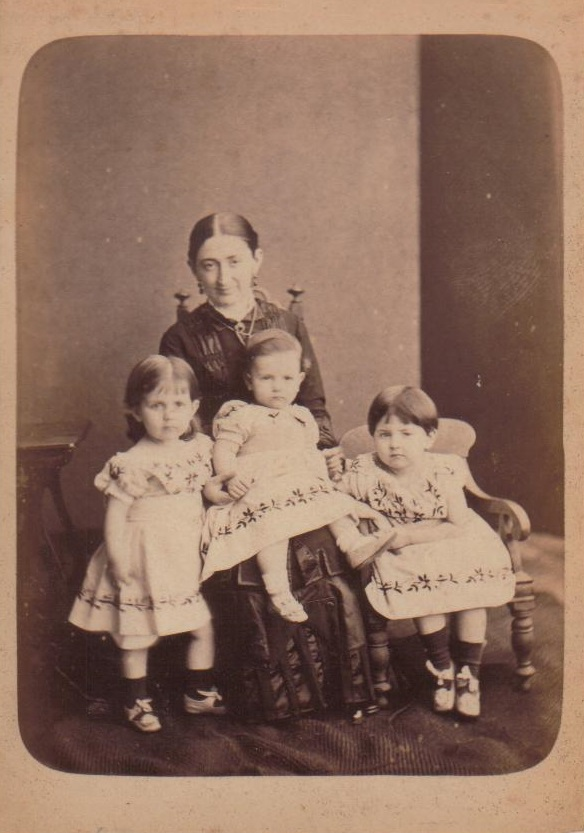
Georgiana Emily Drew (née Down, 1850–1933), with her three children Winifred Nona Radcliffe Drew, Harry Guy Radcliffe Drew, and Georgiana Daisy Radcliffe Drew. About 1882, when she was first principal of Bishopsgate School.

Bishop's College dates its beginning to 1875, when the school with 13 pupils was established at Fairfield House in Darley Road, under the same name - Bishopsgate School. Fairfield House is the present site of Link Holdings Ltd. Even today the word "Bishopsgate" stands engraved at the entrance to the building. The first principal to come out was Georgiana Down, who married Harry Drew, the son of Joseph Drew and music director at the nearby S. Thomas' College. Among the first girls enrolled were Minnie Von Possner, Hilda Obeysekera, Dorah Aserappah and Caroline Peiris. The first boys to enter the kindergarten were James and Donald Obeysekera and Leslie de Saram. Monthly expenses in running the school were about Rs. 300/- which included rent, salaries, and the hire of a piano. The income in fees in the first month totalled Rs. 302/50. In 1882 the school had twenty-one pupils, four of them in the school boarding. But the income was not sufficient to make ends meet. Even with the sale of the furniture, the debts could not be settled. Mrs. Drew resigned in April 1882, and with her departure the school had to be closed again. Mrs. Drew returned to England with her husband and four children.

=== Sisters of St. Margaret (1887–1955) ===
In 1887, three sisters from St Margaret's Convent in East Grinstead, England, came to Ceylon on missionary work. Their Society of Saint Margaret was a sorority founded by John Mason Neale in 1855, which had now expanded to an overseas mission. After a short location at Green Path, they established their convent in Polwatte, Kollupitiya.

One of them, Sister Joanna Mary, was asked to help in the running of the school. Principals and teachers who came to Ceylon to fulfil the goals of Christian mission often had to leave due to ill health, the rigours of the tropical climate or personal reasons. The answer seemed to be with the Sisters of St Margaret, and Sister Angela was the first sister to be principal of Bishopsgate School. The school was to be an institution to promote educational advancement, and also a finishing school for the daughters of Christian families. Subjects taught directed them to the Cambridge local examinations: French, drawing, singing, and piano playing were also on the curriculum.

In 1890, the then bishop of Colombo, Reginald Copleston, purchased the Maradatin Cinnamon Gardens bordering Boyd Place, Colpetty. The school moved from Darley Road to these premises in 1892 and was renamed Bishop's College. Although the Sisters of St Margaret had by now for some years been associated with the running of the school, it was now with this shift that the school was passed into their care. Proximity to St Margaret's Convent at Polwatte was of great significance. For an unbroken period of sixty years from 1895 to 1955 these sisters guided the students of Bishop's College: not only in their mental development, but in the levels of charity, community spirit and public service, and upholding of the school motto "Non Sibi Sed Omnibus" (Not for Self, but for All).

There were twelve sisters who were principals or acting principals of the school in this period of 60 years. They were, in the order of their principalship: Sister Bridget Margaret, Sister Bertha Mary, Sister Letitia, Sister Eva, Sister Mary Kathleen (acting), Sister Marguerite, Sister Ada Mary (acting), Sister Geraldine Mary, Sister Mary Kathleen, Sister Mabel, Sister Celestine and Sister Gabriel.

A close bond was established between Bishop's College and St Margaret's Convent, Polwatte, which remains up to now. The sisters are revered guests at all school functions; Bishop's College participates in all their special occasions and upholds the motto they gave the school by helping to the convent in fund-raising at their annual fair and in many other ways.

The number of students when the school moved to Boyd Place, was 70. As early as 1896 an association of past pupils, known then as the Bishop's College Association, was set up. As Bishop's College entered the 20th century the school chapel was dedicated to St Agnes, the Roman virgin and martyr of the 4th century.

The school faced Boyd Place on the south, a property known as Arncliffe on the east, a building known as Edgecote on the west, and a government reservation adjoining the Beira Lake on the north. The property on which the school was located was held in trust by the bishop of the Diocese of Colombo with a board of three members. As the numbers on the school increased, additional staff had to be recruited and accommodation organised. The adjoining building, Edgecote, was rented out to house the kindergarten. Buildings within the premises were expanded. In due course the school built its own Kindergarten block and Edgecote was given up in 1929. Elscourt, a magnificent building on Turret Road, opposite the Victoria Park, at one time the site of the Orient Club, was gifted to the school by a loyal past pupil, Maude Peiris, mother of Harold Peiris.

After much deliberation, and with the donor's approval, it was decided not to open a unit of the school at Elscourt as it was considered too far from the building at Boyd Place. Elscourt was sold and with funds realised. Arncliffe, the building adjoining the school with two road frontages - Boyd Place and General's Lake Road - was purchased. It was renamed Peiris House as a tribute to the generosity of Maude Peiris. With World War II entering the Asian zone, Bishop's College evacuated to "Fernhill" in Bahirawakanda, Kandy, with 37 students. Since the building could not house all the classrooms, Kandy Girls' High School generously shared their building. Those students who were left behind in Colombo were joined by those of Ladies College who had also not evacuated to form "Lake School" in the Bishop's College premises. Some of the buildings were taken over by the military, so the space was limited. In 1943, the danger from the war removed, the two branches of Bishop's College were reunited at Boyd Place. The number on the roll at the re-establishment was 100.

With the end of the war, the country was moving towards independence, and Bishop's College had in 1943 introduced Sinhala and Tamil as the media of instruction in the kindergarten, while they were being taught as a subject. Although the school had been established as a Christian missionary school, the Sisters of St Margaret had, as early as 1909, adopted a pluralist approach to religion. Of the 114 students at that time, 22 were non-Christian. In 1938 a Buddhist student was appointed head prefect.

=== Moving into the future (1955–2000) ===
In 1955 the sisters ceased to run the school, and a board of governors took over, with the bishop of Colombo as chairman. L. Y. Pode was appointed principal. In 1959 Bishop's College had its first Ceylonese principal, A. C. B. (Amabel) Jayasuriya. With a focus on national culture, she introduced the practice that the students of other faiths should commence their day with their own religious observance, as the Christians did, and have their own societies and celebrate their own festivals. She had a school song composed in Sinhala and set to oriental music. A Hewisi Band was trained to complement the Western Band. The activities of societies were in Sinhala, and in Tamil as the Tamil stream came up the school were on par with the English which had been a long-established tradition.

In 1959 Geoffrey Bawa and Ulrik Plesner were engaged to design a new three-storey classroom block for the school. The classrooms are on the first and second floors with an open ground level, which is used as a covered activity and play area. The design is influenced by Scandinavian modernism with its "white cubic architecture" "sharped edged prismatic forms and brise soleil facades". The interior of the classroom block is protected by perforated external wall panels which are supported on a concrete portal frame and inserted between the exposed beam-ends to give an impression of lightness and delicacy. A heavy horizontal eaves beam is hung out to protect the facade and to mask the pitched roof, thus accentuating the horizontality and modernist credentials of the design. When the building was nearing completion Bawa commissioned Lydia Duchini, an Italian sculptor, to create a sculpture of the bishop. The life sized gold leaf encrusted statue stands at the foot of the main staircase.

The school opted to be a free-levying private school and had to find its own financial resources.

Lindley Jayasuriya is an earlier vice-principal. Hemamali Bibile was the principal from 2003 to 2011. Sharmila Gunatilleke is the current principal.

== Houses ==
The house system is an integral part of Bishop's College. Every student and staff member is placed into one of the four houses. Students who are not first-generation Bishopians get placed into the same house as their kindred. Each house elects a captain, vice captain and games captain at the start of the year both in primary and secondary school. The four houses compete throughout the year in various sports and arts categories, with the main competitive event being the Annual Inter-House Athletics Meet (also known as the Annual Sports Meet), which is held in February. House points are marked throughout the year based on discipline which are then added or deducted during the Athletics Meet. The four houses are:

House name	House colours	House motto
Henley House	Black and gold	Onwards and Upwards
Ford House	Red and gold	Play up, play up, and play the game
Chapman House	Blue and gold	Unity is Strength
Copleston House	Green and gold	Excelsior

== Notable alumni ==
Name	Year/degree	Notability	Reference
Anoka Primrose Abeyrathne		Forbes listed social entrepreneur, Asia-Pacific representative to UN-Habitat YAB	
Harini Amarasuriya		Member of Parliament for National List (2020–2024), member of Parliament for Colombo District (2024–present), prime minister of Sri Lanka (2024–;present)	
Dorothy Fernando		Painter	
Junius Richard Jayewardene		Member of Parliament Kelaniya (1960), Colombo South (1960–1977), Colombo West (1977–1978), prime minister of Sri Lanka (1977–1978), president of Sri Lanka (1978–1989)	
Jayanthi Kuru-Utumpala		First Sri Lankan to climb to the summit of Mount Everest	
Adeline Molamure		CBE, first female member of State Council of Ceylon (1931)	
Farah Rumy		Swiss politician, nurse and medical expert	
Iranganie Serasinghe		Actress	
