= Dorothy King =

American archaeologist and historian

Dorothy Lobel King
- Born: 1975 (age 50–51)
- Scientific career
- Fields: Archaeology
- Patrons: Onassis Foundation
- Thesis: Greek architectural sculpture

Dorothy Louise Victoria Lobel King (born 1975) is an American author who lives and works in England.

== Childhood and education ==
King was born and raised in London where her American father, James King, ran a branch of Oppenheimer & Co. She spent parts of her childhood in Florida and in France. She attended Malvern St James School and King's College London.

King attributes her interest in archaeology to her father's business partner Leon Levy and his wife Shelby White, who co-sponsored major archaeological digs in Israel.

== Career ==
King was awarded her Ph.D. in archaeology by King's College London and the Institute of Classical Studies for a thesis entitled "The Sculptural Decoration of the Doric Order ca.375–31 BC".

She first gained public attention when she opposed the construction of facilities for the 2004 Summer Olympics at the site of the Battle of Marathon.

King wrote a 2006 book entitled The Elgin Marbles defending the British retention of the Marbles against Greek claims that they belong to Greece and should be moved to Athens. She believes Elgin's acquisition of the marbles was legal and has argued against allowing the Greeks to possess the marbles due to what she describes as slipshod conservation practices in Greek archaeological museums. The Sunday Times credited King's book with "reigniting" the controversy over possession of the Elgin marbles. King, however, does not rule out an eventual loan to Greece.

On the name dispute between Greece and the Republic of North Macedonia she said: "The Macedonians invaded and conquered Skopje, but Alexander conquered Iran and Afghanistan as well. None of these two other countries ever claimed to be Macedonia. Amphipolis is in Macedonia, Vergina is in Macedonia and Macedonia is in Greece. To claim the opposite is so ridiculous. It is like saying that Jesus went to America."

== Advocacy ==
She is also known as a blogger who discusses politics, as well as historical and archaeological subjects. In a 2005 article published in The Guardian, King gave her thoughts on the subject of the "gender gap" in academia that was summed up by the article's subtitle, "Wiles, not whining, are the way to overcome the gender gap, says Dorothy King".

== Personal life ==
King lives in Kensington, London.

== Bibliography ==
- King, Dorothy (2006). The Elgin Marbles. London: Hutchinson. ISBN 978-0-09-180013-0.
- The Way of the PhDiva, The Guardian, May 2, 2005.
