= Tom and Catherine =

1999 album by John Miles

Studio album by John Miles
- Released: 1999
- Genre: Rock
- Label: Orange Records

John Miles chronology
Upfront (1993)	Tom and Catherine (1999)

Tom and Catherine is an album by John Miles, released in 1999. The album is the soundtrack to a musical about the life of the novelist Catherine Cookson and her husband Tom Cookson. The musical was written by playwright Tom Kelly, who asked Miles to write music for it (they had already collaborated on Machine Gunners).

== Track listing ==
All songs written by Kelly/Miles

1. "In this Life"
2. "I Must Leave the Tyne"
3. "Someone Out There"
4. "The Power of Drink"
5. "Something Special"
6. "The First time I Saw You"
7. "I Need Your Love"
8. "This Love"
9. "The First Time I Saw You" (Reprise)
10. "Love at the Stars of the Sea"
11. "Hanging on to Life"
12. "Believe in Dreams"
13. "Blessed with Peace"
14. "Go Back Home"
15. "Knight in Shining"
16. "I Need Your Love" (Reprise)

== Personnel ==
- John Miles - lead vocals, keyboards, guitar
- Sara Murray - lead vocals
