= The Elgin Marbles (book) =

2006 book by Dorothy King

- Author: Dorothy King
- Language: English
- Genre: Non-fiction
- Publication date: 2006

The Elgin Marbles is a 2006 book by American archaeologist Dorothy King about the 5th century BCE Classical Greek marble sculptures known as the Elgin Marbles.

The book is credited by The Sunday Times with "reigniting" the controversy over possession of the Elgin marbles by defending the right of the British Museum in London to retain them in the face of demands by the government of Greece that they be returned to Athens where they were created and displayed on the Parthenon before their purchase and removal by Thomas Bruce, 7th Earl of Elgin in 1801.

King argues that the British Museum has a right to retain the marbles because they belong to the cultural heritage of many nations, Britain included, and because inferior facilities for their preservation in Greece would endanger their physical conservation if they were to be housed in Athens. The susceptibility of Athens to major earthquakes is among the specific threats she cites.
