= Sara Murray =

British entrepreneur

- Occupation: Entrepreneur
- Known for: Founder Buddi ltd
- Website: https://www.buddi.co.uk/

Sara Murray OBE (born 2 November 1968) is a British entrepreneur and businesswoman who founded buddi ltd, a miniaturised tracking device for vulnerable people. She was a member of the British Government's Technology Strategy Board.

== Early life and education ==
Born in Lancashire, Murray went to Malvern Girls' College and then read Physiology, Psychology and Philosophy at St Hilda's College, Oxford.

== Career ==
Murray was chief executive of Big Technologies plc, the parent company of Buddi Ltd, incorporated in 2017, which listed on the London Stock Exchange in July 2021, raising £577 million.

On 18 March 2025, Murray was suspended as chief executive with the company stating it "could no longer rely" on a statement she had signed in relation to her connections with a network of "opaque" offshore shell companies. On 31 March, Murray was sacked as a director of both Buddi Ltd and Big Technologies and was referred to the government's Takeover Panel over allegations that she "extracted significant sums" from the group via her undisclosed interests in offshore entities. The company alleged that Murray had "provided untrue information to the company and its lawyers", and therefore the High Court, on her relationship with the offshore firms during litigation brought by former shareholders. Murray said in a statement that she did not "own or control any" of the offshore companies at the centre of the controversy and said the board was "unfit for purpose".

The decision to remove Murray was criticised by some of the company's shareholders including Paul Sanger-Davies, who said the board had taken a "disastrous decision to remove Sara from her key leadership role, and in doing so have wiped out a significant amount of the company's value". He said she should be reinstalled "to her rightful place as leader so that she can repair the damage".

== Awards ==
Murray was appointed as an Officer of the Order of the British Empire in the 2012 Birthday Honours for services to entrepreneurship and innovation.
