= Zaragon =

1978 studio album by John Miles

Studio album by John Miles
- Released: March 1978
- Recorded: October–December 1977
- Studio: Plaza Sound Studios, New York City
- Genre: Rock
- Length: 46:25
- Label: Decca
- Producer: Rupert Holmes

John Miles chronology
Stranger in the City (1977)	Zaragon (1978)	More Miles Per Hour (1979)

Zaragon is the third album by English singer/songwriter/guitarist John Miles, first released in 1978 and reissued as CD in 2008.

== Background ==
The release of Zaragon followed an extremely successful period in the career of John Miles who, during 1976 and 1977, had enjoyed two hit albums (Rebel and Stranger in the City) and four successful singles. Decca remained Miles' record label in the UK but, for the US release, Arista Records paid $500,000 to buy out his contract with London Records. An advance of $500,000 made this into a million-dollar album before release.

== Music ==
In a change of direction from his earlier material (most notably his signature single "Music"), Miles decided not to use orchestral backing on Zaragon. Miles played guitars, keyboards and synthesisers on the album, with Barry Black on drums and Bob Marshall on bass.

The opening track, "Overture", was a rock epic in which keyboards took the place of the orchestral backing on his earlier material. The track is notable for an outstanding guitar solo by Miles. The long, three-part "Nice Man Jack" – a song about Jack the Ripper – was the centrepiece of the album, whilst the title track was science fiction orientated.

== Album and singles ==
Zaragon reached No. 43 in the UK charts, a respectable showing given that musical fashions were moving away from "epic-rock" towards punk and disco. The album was not released on CD until March 2008, thirty years after Zaragon first appeared.

The only single release in the UK was "No Hard Feelings" which the New Musical Express described as "an agreeable ballad". The B-side of the single was "Mitre Square", the second part of the "Nice Man Jack" trilogy. In Spain, the order was reversed, with "Mitre Square" the A-side.

== Track listing ==
All songs written by Bob Marshall and John Miles

1. "Overture" 8:15
2. "Borderline" 4:56
3. "I Have Never Been in Love Before" 5:07
4. "No Hard Feelings" 3:22
5. "Plain Jane" 8:09
6. "Nice Man Jack": – 7:45
  1. "Kensington Gardens"
  2. "Mitre Square"
  3. "Harley Street"
7. "Zaragon" 5:31

Bonus track on the 2008 reissue

1. "Nice Man Jack" (single edit) 3:20

== Personnel ==
- John Miles - vocals, guitar, keyboards, special effects
- Bob Marshall - electric bass
- Barry Black - drums, percussion

Technical

- Rob Freeman - engineer
- Hipgnosis - photography
