= Stranger in the City (album) =

Studio album by John Miles
- Released: February 1977
- Recorded: 1976
- Studio: Mediasound, New York City; Utopia, London
- Genre: Rock
- Length: 35:49
- Label: London
- Producer: Rupert Holmes

John Miles chronology
Rebel (1976)	Stranger in the City (1977)	Zaragon (1978)

Professional ratings
Review scores
Source	Rating
Sounds	4/5 stars

Stranger in the City is the second solo album by John Miles, released in 1977. It was awarded BPI Silver Certification on 19 July 1977.

== Background and composition ==
Recording sessions with its producer and orchestral arranger Rupert Holmes started in the summer of 1976 in the United States when Miles was promoting his first album Rebel. The bulk of the album was recorded in England.

For this album, Miles recruited Australian keyboardist Gary Moberley because Miles felt that his previous album was missing something funky.

Both "Remember Yesterday" and "Slow Down" charted in the UK (respectively 32 and 10) and would be the last Miles singles to chart in Britain until 1983. Although the singles did fairly well, the album itself barely cracked the top 40 of the UK chart and reaching No. 82 in Canada. However, the cut "Slow Down" proved to be Miles' biggest US chart hit, peaking at No. 2 on the Billboard Disco chart, No. 34 on the Billboard Hot 100 in June 1977, but just No. 68 in Canada.

"Remember Yesterday" was written about Bob Marshall, who was according to Miles a very romantic type, because he drifted around from girl to girl. A track of the title song had been recorded during the sessions of Rebel and was originally planned to be released as the B-side of "Highfly", but was shelved. It was orchestrated by Holmes who added percussion in New York performed by recording legend Jimmy Maelen. "Manhattan Skyline" was written about the first impressions Miles and Marshall had of New York and was recorded entirely in Manhattan.

In 1977, singer-songwriter Melissa Manchester covered the Miles-Marshall ballad "Time," which on Stranger in the City was performed solely by Miles at the piano, accompanied by strings and brass.

In 2007, the album was rereleased and remastered with several bonus tracks.

== Track listing ==
All tracks written by Bob Marshall and John Miles except where noted

1. "Stranger in the City" 4:30
2. "Slow Down" 4:46
3. "Stand up (And Give Me a Reason)" 7:03
4. "Time" 3:57
5. "Manhattan Skyline" 3:06
6. "Glamour Boy" 4:49
7. "Do it Anyway" (Barry Black) 2:46
8. "Remember Yesterday" 5:23
9. "Music Man" 4:53
10. "House On The Hill" 4:21 (On 1989 CD release only)
11. "Man Behind The Guitar" 4:03 (On 1989 CD release only)
12. "Putting My New Song Together" 4:21 (On 1989 CD release only)
13. "Sweet Lorraine" 3:02 (On 1989 CD release only)

Bonus tracks on reissue

1. "House on the Hill" (B-side of "Remember Yesterday") 4:19
2. "Slow Down" 4:14
3. "Stand Up (And Give me a Reason)" 3:45
4. "Remember Yesterday" 3:18

== Personnel ==
- John Miles – vocals, piano, guitar
- Bob Marshall – bass guitar
- Barry Black – drums
- Gary Moberley – keyboards
- Jimmy Maelen – conga, Latin percussion
- Rupert Holmes – producer, orchestral arrangements, conductor

Technical

- Bob Clearmountain, James Guthrie, Mike Bobak - engineer
- Godfrey Diamond - mixing
- Hipgnosis - design, photography
