= Transition (John Miles album) =

1985 studio album by John Miles

Studio album by John Miles
- Released: November 1985
- Recorded: 1985
- Genre: Rock
- Length: 40:05
- Label: Valentino Records
- Producer: Pat Moran, Trevor Rabin, Beau Hill

John Miles chronology
Play On (1983)	Transition (1985)	Upfront (1993)

Professional ratings
Review scores
Source	Rating
Kerrang!	3.5/5 stars

Transition is the seventh studio album of John Miles in 1985, credited to the John Miles Band. In early 1984, Miles began to work on songs for his next album and went on tour to promote his current album Play On. In late spring 1984, Miles and Marshall wrote more songs from the album while their manager was looking for a new record label.

Some time later, while he was performing in a residence in Ibiza, Miles met Phil Carson, who was an executive from Atlantic Records. He signed Miles to a new record label, Valentino.
Miles and Marshall started to work with producer Trevor Rabin. Rabin, who had other commitments, only produced two tracks for them ("Blinded" and "I Need Your Love"). Miles did not want another long delay like with the previous album, he continued recording with engineer Pat Moran (who produced all other tracks except "Watching on Me" which was produced by Beau Hill) in Wales. "Blinded" and "I Need Your Love" were released as singles, but both failed to chart in the U.K, just like the album.

== Track listing ==
All songs written by Marshall/Miles

1. "Once in Your Life" – 3:56
2. "Run" – 3:46
3. "Blinded" – 6:29
4. "You're the One" – 4:32
5. "I Need Your Love" – 4:56
6. "Hard Time" – 4:13
7. "Who Knows" – 3:56
8. "Don't Lie to Me" – 4:24
9. "Watching over Me" – 3:53

== Personnel ==
=== Band members ===
- John Miles - lead vocals, guitar, keyboards
- Bob Marshall - bass
- Barriemore Barlow - drums, percussion, backing vocals

=== Production ===
- Pat Moran – producer, engineer, re-mixing
- Trevor Rabin – producer on tracks 3, 5
- Beau Hill – producer on track 9
- Steve Benson, Paul DeVillea – engineers
- Phil Vinall – mixing
