= Music (John Miles song) =

Single by John Miles

from the album Rebel
- Released: 1976
- Recorded: 1975
- Studio: Abbey Road, London
- Genre: Progressive rock
- Length: 5:58 (album version); 5:52 (single version)
- Label: Decca, London
- Songwriter: John Miles
- Producer: Alan Parsons

Official audio
- "Music" on YouTube

"Music" is a song by English musician John Miles, from his album Rebel, produced by Alan Parsons. Released as a single in 1976, the song was successful in Europe, reaching No. 1 on the Dutch Single Top 100, No. 3 on the UK Singles Chart and No. 10 on the German Singles Chart. In the US, it reached No. 88 on the Billboard Hot 100. In 1982, the song was re-released in the Netherlands and reached No. 4.

The song features a section with an unusual time signature of seven beats per bar – 7/8 (can also be counted as 7/4).

In November 2009, a dance version in collaboration with Belgian dance act Sylver was released, of which Miles's son (guitarist John Miles Jr.) is a member. This version reached No. 11 in Belgium.

== Charts ==
Chart (1976)	Peak position
Argentina (Record World)	3
Australia (Kent Music Report)	38
Belgium (Ultratop 50 Flanders)	1
Belgium (Ultratop 50 Wallonia)	10
France (SNEP)	98
Ireland (IRMA)	2
Israel (Israeli Singles Chart)	15
Italy (Musica e dischi)	2
Netherlands (Dutch Single Top 100)	1
Spain (PROMUSICAE)	15
Switzerland (Schweizer Hitparade)	4
UK Singles (Official Charts Company)	3
U.S. Hot 100 (Billboard)	88
Germany (Offizielle Deutsche Charts)	10

== Personnel ==
- John Miles: lead vocals, piano, guitar, harpsichord
- Bob Marshall: bass
- Barry Black: drums, percussion
- Andrew Powell: orchestral arrangements
