= Malvern St James =

Malvern St James School
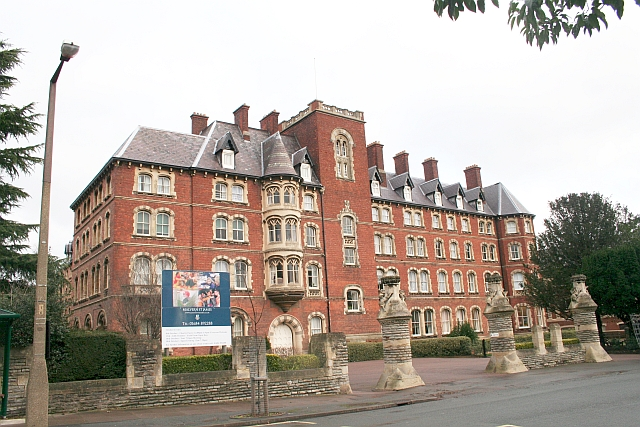

Location
- Avenue Road; Malvern, Worcestershire, WR14 3BA; England; 52.11035°N 2.31756°W

Information
- Motto: Included "Empowering Girls, Empowering Futures", although the school latterly was using phasing in broader language such as "A Proud Past, Bold Future, Empowering Every Pupil" to reflect the brief inclusion of boys.
- Established: 1893 as "Malvern Girls' College"
- Founder: Miss Greenslade and Miss Poulton (Malvern Girls' College)
- Closed: 2026
- Department for Education URN: 117018 Tables
- Head: Vacant
- Gender: Co-Educational
- Age: 3 to 18
- Enrolment: 270 (of a possible 450) at time of closing
- Houses: Benhams, Austen, Poulton, and Greenslade
- Colours: Navy Blue and Sky Blue
- Publication: The MSJ Chronicle, The Review (formerly Looking Ahead), OGA News: The official magazine of the Old Girls’ Association
- fees: £3,069 - £19,765(per term) at tine of closing
- Website: http://www.malvernstjames.co.uk/

Malvern St James School was an independent day and boarding school, which closed in the summer of 2026, and was located in Great Malvern, Worcestershire, England. In April 2026, Galaxy Global Education Group announced that the school would close in summer 2026.

It was first founded in 1893 as Malvern Girls' College, it adopted the name it held when it when it merged with St James's School in 2006.

Originally established as a girls' school, the institution experienced a period of reduced enrollment due to VAT and other costs.. In early 2025, the school transitioned from a charitable trust to a for-profit model following its acquisition by the China-founded Galaxy Global Education Group, alongside plans to introduce a co-educational model.

Prior to this, Malvern College had proposed a merger, that would have secured the future of Malvern St James. This was rejected by the Headteacher Gareth Lloyd and the Governing body.

Prominent voices including then Shadow Education Minister Saqib Bhatti MP and Sir Ian Duncan Smith MP also identified the institution's foreign acquisition and closure as a national security issue, heavily criticizing the trustees at the time for failing to adequately consider these geopolitical and UK national security risks.

This transition to a for-profit model and subsequent collapse led to legal action against the trustees and the corporate entities involved, in a context of widely reported asset stripping allegations.

The school provided education across three departments: a Prep Department (ages 3–11), Senior School (ages 11–16), and a Sixth Form (ages 16–18).

Following the announcement of the closure, Malvern College offered places to all St James pupils to complete their education.

== History ==
=== Two original schools ===
==== Malvern Girls College ====
Malvern Girls' College was founded in 1893 by Miss Greenslade and Miss Poulton. it was first located in College Road; in 1919 it moved to buildings of the former Imperial Hotel. In 1934, a major extension including an assembly hall was built. Further extensions included the Hatfield building in the 1960s, the Edinburgh Dome in 1977 and The Science Education Centre in 1998.

==== St James's School and The Abbey School ====
St James's School was founded in the south of England by twin sisters Alice and Katrine Baird in 1896 and moved to the large mansion of Lord Howard de Walden in West Malvern in 1902.

The Abbey School was founded in Blockley, Worcestershire and moved to Malvern in 1897 and to Malvern Wells in 1908. Two of the Baird sisters, Diana and Alice, ran the two houses for students: the Junior House, for the girls aged 11–14, and the Senior House for girls above 14. "The Miss Bairds were remarkable: five spinster sisters all over six feet tall and all to be Head Mistresses." The girls wore a simple uniform: white cotton shirts, navy blue coats and skirts. "There were no 'O Levels' or 'A Levels' in those days, and exams were not taken seriously. 'Citizenship' was what the Miss Bairds were most anxious to instill; it must be admitted with considerable success--many girls were later notable for lives of public service."

=== Mergers ===
In 1979 the two schools merged on the West Malvern campus of St James and the resulting school was named St James's & The Abbey. In 1994 Lawnside School, which was founded around 1856, merged with St James's & The Abbey School and the school was renamed St James's. In 2006, Malvern Girls' College merged with St James's School and was refounded as Malvern St James (MSJ).

=== Examination set text error ===
In May 2019, Malvern St James received national media coverage after students sitting a Cambridge IGCSE English literature exam discovered they had been taught the wrong set text. Pupils had prepared for Michael Frayn's Spies, but no questions on the book appeared on the exam. A spokesman for the Department for Education said:

What happened at St James is an issue of concern and the department is considering appropriate next steps to get assurance about the school’s procedures.

Headmistress Olivera Raraty issued a public apology and applied for "special consideration" from the exam board to ensure students were not disadvantaged. The incident was widely reported by outlets including the BBC, The Times and The Independent.

=== Ownership change, regulatory issues and closure ===
In February 2025, Malvern St James ended its status as an independent charitable trust and was acquired by the Galaxy Global Education Group (GGEG). The Chinese group, founded by Shangmei Gao, which had rapidly taken on several other UK institutions, including Plymouth College and Durham High School (both of which were, like this school, rapidly closed in contentious circumstances).

On 21 March 2025, the school announced that it would accept boys for the first time in September 2025 and become a co-educational school.

In March 2025, an inspection by the Independent Schools Inspectorate (ISI) found that Malvern St James had failed to meet regulatory standards regarding fire safety. As a result of this, the inspectorate concluded that the school did not meet the required standards for "leadership and management" and "pupils' physical and mental health and emotional wellbeing" at the time of the visit.

In early 2026, the school announced a period of organizational restructuring, citing a "challenging economic climate." This followed the mid-academic year departure of headmaster Gareth Lloyd, who took early retirement in January 2026 after two years in the role. Frances King was subsequently appointed as interim headmistress. As part of the restructuring process, the school opened a voluntary redundancy window for all staff. A spokesperson for the school clarified that these redundancies were not targeted at specific individuals and refuted claims that managerial positions had been transferred to other partner institutions within the Galaxy Global Education Group.

In April 2026, Galaxy Global Education Group announced that the school should close in summer 2026. The entity quickly went on to close several other schools it had rapidly acquired, triggering repeated and vigorous allegations of asset stripping.

=== National security concerns linked to manner of closure ===
Security experts and British politicians have raised national security concerns regarding the foreign acquisition and subsequent closure of the Malvern St James campus by Galaxy Global Education Group. Key factors include the site's proximity to critical British defense infrastructure—sitting half a mile from a defense contractor and 20 miles from GCHQ—and the parent company's refusal to clarify future plans for the land or accept local buyout offers. Additionally, analysts noted risks stemming from Chinese corporate laws, which can compel private firms to cooperate with state intelligence, alongside specific concerns that the acquisition exposed the family details of individuals working in sensitive security roles.

=== Governance and regulatory failures at time of failure ===
Regulatory filings revealed significant compliance issues surrounding the school's operations. The primary entity filed its accounts 61 days late, following a six-month extension previously granted by the Charity Commission. Additionally, the associated 'friends' support group experienced severe filing delays, submitting accounts 225 days and 71 days late (a criminal breach of s. 173 of the Charities Act 2011), during a period when the organization operated with only a single trustee.

=== Legal action and trustee scrutiny following closure ===
Following its acquisition by Galaxy Global Education Group and subsequent closure, the situation led to legal action targeting former trustees and corporate leadership. Critics and stakeholders cited the severe impact on families and alleged that false representations had been made regarding the school's financial stability before its collapse.

=== Impact on students and community of closure ===
Following the announcement of its closure by Galaxy Global Education, pupils and parents expressed widespread devastation and shock over the sudden shutdown of the 133-year-old institution. The closure left nearly 200 students facing difficulties in finding alternative placements and in completing their A-levels or studies. Families and staff criticized the handling of the transition by the former trustees and by Galaxy Global.

Following the permanent closure of Malvern St James, the local community and the Malvern Civic Society raised alarm and concern regarding the future of the historic, Grade II-listed main buildings.

== Architecture ==
=== The Imperial Hotel ===
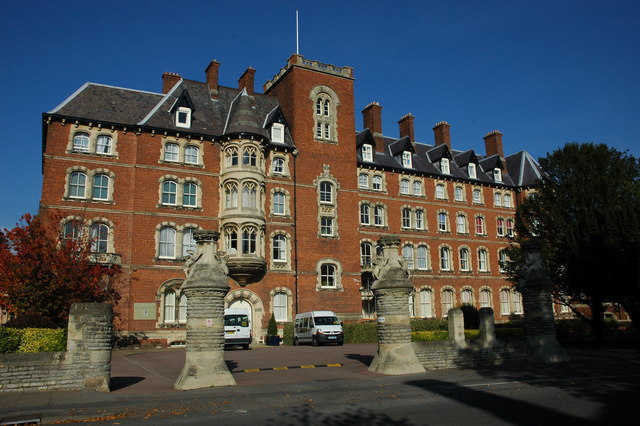
Main building – the former Imperial Hotel

Following the collapse of the spa industry, many of the hotels were acquired for use as private boarding schools, and education became the basis of Malvern's economy; the Imperial Hotel was purchased by the school in 1919. The former hotel is directly opposite Great Malvern railway station, with its dedicated (now derelict) tunnel to the basement of the building, which is clearly visible from both platforms of the station. The red brick and stone Imperial Hotel, which had been the largest in Malvern during the town's heyday as a spa in the second half of the 19th century, is still one of the largest buildings in Malvern and was built in 1860 by the architect E. W. Elmslie. He also designed the Great Malvern railway station, the Council House and The Grove in Avenue Road in 1867, originally to be his private residence, which in 1927 became part of the Lawnside School. The Imperial was the first hotel to be lit by incandescent gas. It was equipped with all types of baths and brine was brought specially by rail from Droitwich. In 1934 the building was extended with the addition of the York Hall, officially opened by Queen Elizabeth The Queen Mother.

=== The Edinburgh Dome ===
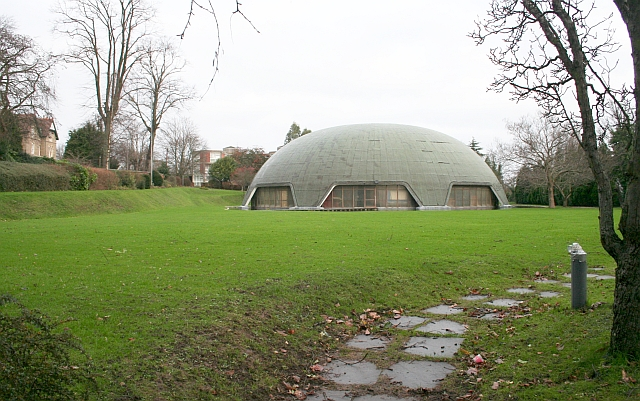
The Edinburgh Dome

The school campus has a listed sports hall – The Edinburgh Dome, opened by the Duke of Edinburgh. It consists of a round, green, balloon-shaped building, containing squash courts, a gym area and a games area, surrounded by a moat. Based on an innovative roof construction by Dante Bini, the Binishell (or Parashell), it was built in 1977 by architect Michael Godwin and consultant engineer John Fabe. It has been designated a Grade II listed building.

== Fees ==
As of the 2023-24 academic year, fees at the school range from £2,915 to £15,410 per term.

== Alumnae ==
=== Malvern St James Girls' School ===
- Hon. Beryl Cozens Hardy OBE (1911-2011) first British woman to chair the committee of the World Association of Girl Guides and Girl Scouts from 1972-1975
- Marion Greeves, MBE (1894-1979) the first woman to be elected to the Senate of Northern Ireland
- Jennifer Kirby, television and stage actress
- Iskra Lawrence, model, activist, and one of the BBC's 100 Women
- Catrina Leung, television actress, singer-songwriter and model

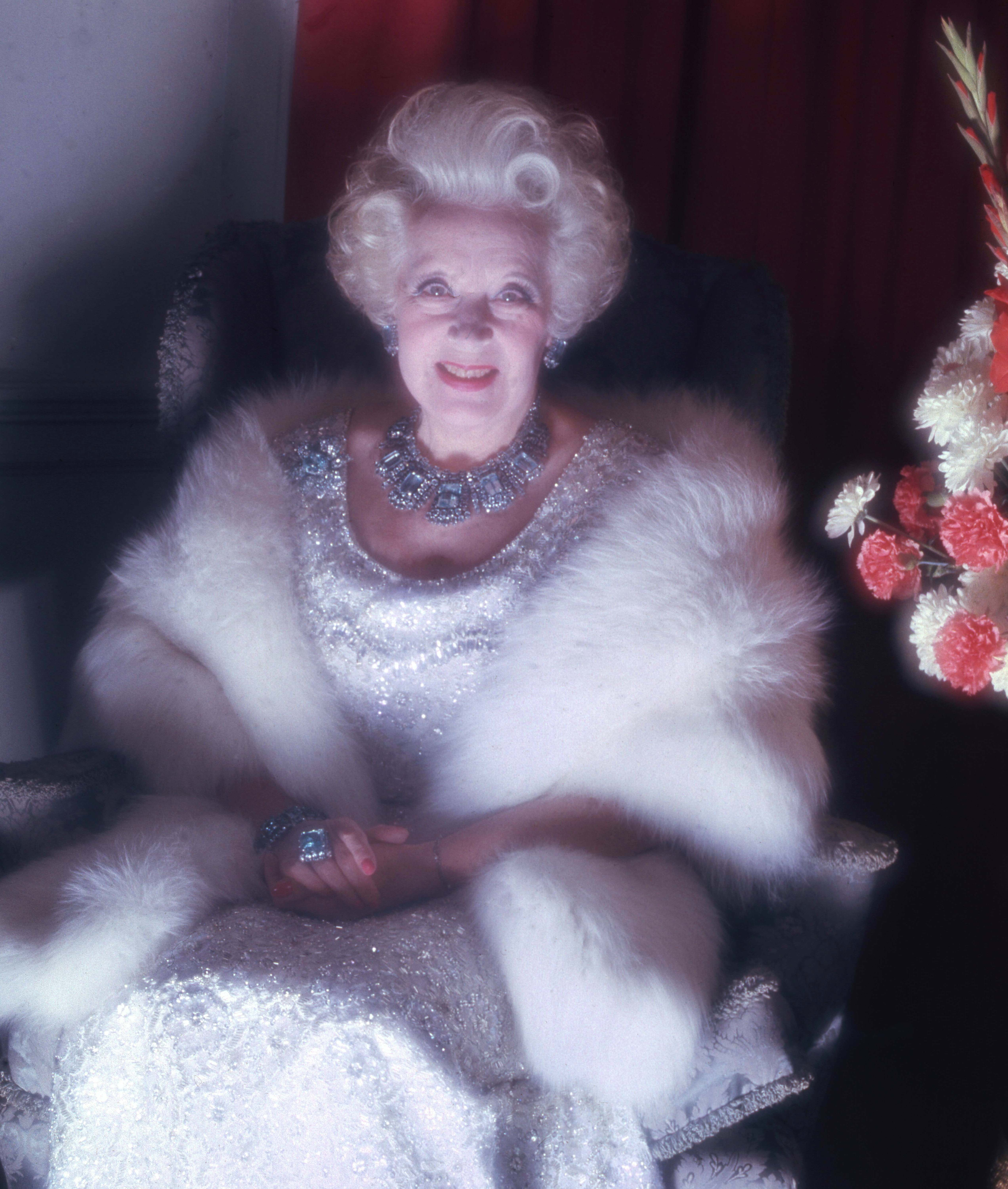
Dame Barbara Cartland - former pupil

=== Malvern Girls' College ===
- Mary Hayley Bell (1911 – 2005), playwright and author of Whistle Down the Wind
- Barbara Cartland (1901 – 2000), novelist
- Jane Davidson, minister for environment and sustainability in Wales from 2007 to 2011
- Melanie Dawes, economist and civil servant
- Imogen Edwards-Jones, author of 'Hotel Babylon'
- Dorothy Fernando (1907 – 1981), Sri Lankan painter
- Manya Harari (1905 – 1969), Russian born British translator of Russian literature and the co-founder of Harvill Press
- Peggy Jay (1913 – 2008), politician and campaigner, attended briefly
- Anna Kavan (1901 – 1968), novelist, author and painter
- Dorothy King, archaeologist and author
- Elizabeth Lane (1905 – 1988), first female high court judge
- Caroline Lucas, MP, leader of the Green Party 2008–2010
- Frances Lynn, English journalist
- Sara Murray, British entrepreneur and businesswoman
- Donna Ong, Singapore-based artist
- Joanna Van Gyseghem, actress
- Tania Long (1913 – 1998), German-born Canadian/American WWII journalist

=== Lawnside ===
- Phyllida Lloyd, Director of "Mamma Mia"

=== St James's, West Malvern ===
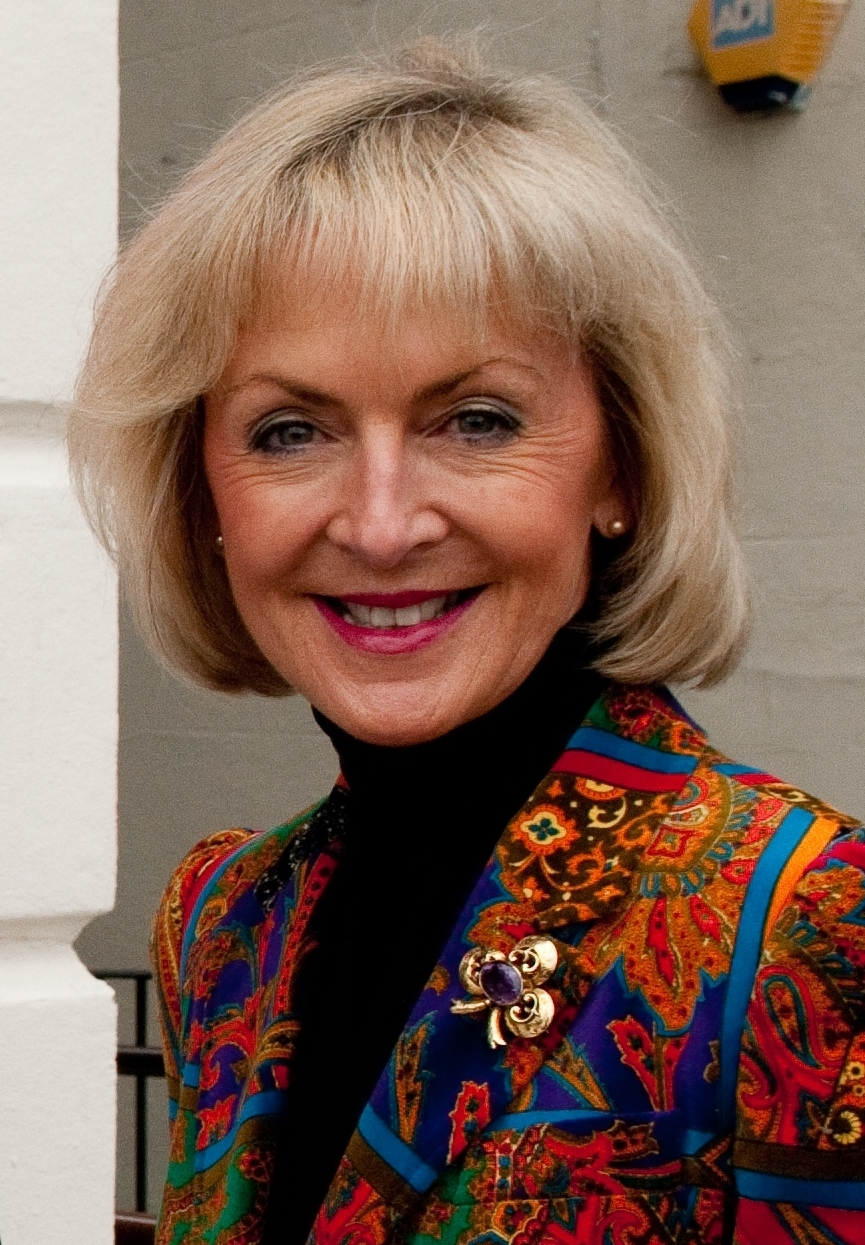
- Penelope Lyttelton, Viscountess Cobham - former student
  Princess Alice, Duchess of Gloucester (1901-2004)
- Penelope Lyttelton, Viscountess Cobham, businesswoman
- Dame Clara Furse, chief executive (retired) of the London Stock Exchange
- Penelope Leach, childcare expert

=== The Abbey School ===
- Professor Ursula Martin, computer scientist

== Notable staff ==
- Rear Admiral Rodney Sturdee, bursar of Malvern Girls' College, 1972–1985

== Academic results ==
In 2024, 40% of A-level grades were A*–A, and 80% of GCSE entries were graded 9–6. This followed 2023 results where 31% of A-levels were A*–A. During the 2020 and 2021 periods of teacher-assessed grading, the school reported significantly higher top marks, with A*–A grades reaching 75% in 2021.

== See also ==
List of independent schools in the United Kingdom
