= Alice Baird =

British Girl Guide executive and school founder

- Baird from a 1951 magazine
- Born: Alice Anne Baird; 6 October 1871; London, England
- Died: 10 August 1959 (aged 87); Worcester, England
- Occupations: School founder Girl Guide executive

Alice Baird (6 October 1871 – 10 August 1959) was the founder of St James' School for girls in Malvern in 1896, where, in 1919, she established one of the earliest Girl Guide companies. She was a recipient of the Silver Fish Award, the Girl Guiding Association's (GGA) highest adult honour, in 1922.

== Personal life ==
Alice Ann Baird was of Scottish parentage. She was one of twins, born in London, to Jonathan Peel Baird (1844–1915), manager of the Earl of Home's Lanarkshire estate, and Emily Diana Frances. Baird was one of ten children, including five sisters: Helen, Katherine (known as Katrine, her twin), Mary, Diana and Constance. In 1910, Baird covered half the cost of printing The Little People, a book of poetry by Nancy Maude, Baird's cousin. In 1935 she donated £100 towards the extension of West Malvern's playing fields, in order to include a cricket pitch and a football pitch. In 1936 she was invited to launch a 12,000-ton oil tanker called 'British Confidence' at Birkenhead. The ship's owner, Sir John Cadman, had a daughter at St James' School. By 1956, Baird was blind and bedridden. She died in a Worcester nursing home in 1959 after a long illness.

== St James' School ==
In 1896, together with her twin sister, Katrine, Baird established St James' School for girls, initially in Southbourne-on-Sea. The school moved to Crowborough in 1900, then, having grown to one hundred pupils, to West Malvern in 1902. Baird was headmistress for 52 years, retiring in 1948. After retirement she remained on the school's council and moved into the Junior House. In 1956 she worked with former pupils to publish I Was There, St. James's West Malvern, a book about the school's first 60 years.

== Girl Guides and the Baden-Powells ==
Baird was a close friend of Lord and Lady Baden-Powell. They met when the couple visited Malvern to watch a Scout display. Baird would visit them at their home, Pax Hill, and in 1929, when recovering from an operation, she joined them on a cruise around West Africa. The Baden-Powells' two daughters, Heather (1915–1986) and Betty (1917–2004) attended St James' and the Baden-Powells would visit frequently. Lord Baden-Powell was one of St James' School original council members and, in 1934, he opened a new wing at the school.

Together with Allison Cargill and Winifred Lander, Baird established a Guide company at St James' School in 1911, with Baird as the company's captain. She attended the movement's first Commissioners' conference in 1916 and was pivotal in forming a cadet branch in the same year.

Between 1917 and 1946, Baird was on the Girl Guide council and was county commissioner for Worcestershire from 1917 to 1925. In the 1920s she was head of schools companies and cadet corps.

She was subsequently assistant county commissioner until at least 1941. Baird received the Silver Fish Award in 1922. From 1925 until 1952 she was assistant county commissioner for Worcestershire. She was a vice president of the Girl Guide Association from 1942 to 1959.
