= George Jeffreys (pastor) =

Welsh minister, founder of the Elim Pentecostal Church

- Born: 28 February 1889; Nantyffylon, Wales
- Died: 26 January 1962 (aged 72)
- Occupation: Minister

Ecclesiastical career
- Religion: Pentecostalism
- Offices held: Principal of Elim Pentecostal Church

George Jeffreys (28 February 1889 – 26 January 1962) was a Welsh evangelist who founded the Elim Pentecostal Church, a Pentecostal organisation.

== Biography ==
As a fifteen-year-old from Nantyffylon, Maesteg, Wales, Jeffreys became a Christian on 20 November 1904, under the ministry of Glasnant Jones, during the 1904-1905 Welsh Revival, along with his older brother Stephen. The brothers involved themselves in the work of the church, and were looked on as 'revivalists' and 'children of the revival' as they sought to keep the revival alive. Jeffreys would come to believe that the Pentecostal movement was itself an extension of this revival.

=== Ministry ===
In 1910, after becoming a very popular speaker in certain circles throughout the country, Jeffreys went to the All Saints' Anglican Church in Sunderland, England. There he saw people expressing the Gifts of the Spirit, particularly speaking in tongues as in Acts chapter 2 in the Bible. Jeffreys was at first opposed to this, but when his nephew, Edward, claimed to have received the Baptism of the Holy Spirit, and he noticed the change in his nephew, he repented of his unbelief in the All Saints' church, and subsequently, began to express such gifts himself.

In the many churches, conventions and camp meetings where George and Stephen Jeffreys preached in the years after this, there were reports of many miraculous healings and other acts of God. George, along with a small group of peers, became known as the Elim Evangelistic Band in Belfast and all over Ulster. This group of people brought crowds into their large tent, and later, into the Belfast hall they acquired. Out of this, Jeffreys founded his first church in Belfast in 1914 followed by one in Monaghan in 1915, and it was in Monagan, in a meeting in the Knox Temperance Hotel on 7 January 1915, that the Elim Foursquare Gospel Alliance, as it is officially known, was born.

Many more Elim churches were soon planted all over the United Kingdom, first of all spreading through the province of Ulster to Ballymena, Moneyslane and Portadown, then on to Leigh-on-Sea, Essex, The First Elim Church in England, and Clapham in London and in Wales at Llanelli and Dowlais. In 1925, he founded the Elim Bible College in Clapham, which moved to Capel in Surrey in 1965 and then to Nantwich, Cheshire, in 1987 and later became Regents Theological College. The college moved again in 2009 to West Malvern.

Jeffreys continued to lead the Elim Pentecostal Churches until December 1939 when, due to differences in opinion on church leadership, and reforms he wanted to institute, and the influence of British Israelism, which he espoused, he resigned. He was persuaded to return but resigned a second time in 1940, leaving for Nottingham to found the Bible-Pattern Church Fellowship. The new denomination ran for about 20 years, but after Jeffreys’ death, it suffered a serious decline in numbers in the later years of the 1960s and no longer exists as a separate entity. Its main church was Kensington Temple, which Jeffreys had bought in 1930 with Elim funds, and was held in trust for Elim, but which the trustees refused to return to Elim after the split. However, the trustees sold the building back to Elim after the death of Jeffreys, becoming, once again, the central London church of the Elim Pentecostal Church.

Late in the year of 1961, Reinhard Bonnke visited Jeffreys at his home in Clapham, when Bonnke was on vacation in London. Jeffreys prayed for the young 21-year-old Bonnke. Bonnke describes how Jeffreys blessed him, "as a father blesses a son, as Abraham blessed Isaac, who blessed Jacob". Bonnke went on to become a major Pentecostal evangelist in Africa.

== Theology ==
Jeffrey's was an evangelist first, and never wrote a systematised theology. He spoke of carrying out evangelism "on Pentecostal lines". Having established the Elim movement, he visited Angelus Temple in 1924 and spoke with Aimee Semple-McPherson, after which he began to use the motto of the Foursquare gospel. By 1929, the Elim movement was renamed to be the Elim Foursquare Gospel Alliance. The Foursquare gospel stresses the Pentecostal distinctive theology of Jesus Christ as Saviour, Baptiser in the Holy Spirit, Healer and Coming King.

Jeffreys believed in the Pentecostal doctrine of Baptism with the Holy Spirit as a post conversion experience, imbuing power for service. However, he diverged from many other Pentecostals in that he did not believe the Baptism with the Spirit was necessarily evidenced by speaking in tongues. Instead, he believed that the evidence was any supernatural manifestation in the believer.

Jeffreys taught that believers do not receive the Holy Spirit at conversion, but instead receive what he termed the Spirit of Christ, as distinct from the Holy Spirit. At regeneration the Second Person of the Trinity indwells the believer, but this, he said, was entirely distinct from the Holy Spirit, who is received only at baptism in the Holy Spirit. The doctrine made conversion entirely christological, while Spirit baptism remained distinctly pneumatological. This fitted the pattern of the Foursquare Gospel. The teaching was popular among Pentecostals in the 1920s-30s but was never official Elim policy, and is virtually unknown today.

Jeffreys wrote about his views on Divine healing in Healing Rays (1932). He argued that such healing was not psychological faith healing, and he accepted the place of natural healing through modern medicine, condemning those who refuse medical cures.

His theology was built on a contrast between Adam and Christ. Sickness is one effect of the Fall, and the atonement pays for its removal. He attacked what he called "lower critics" who confine miracles to the apostolic age or postpone them to the Millennium (cessationists and dispensationalists among others). He argued from the Church Fathers and from history that healing has always been available to the Church.

He affirmed an evangelical view on the inspiration of scripture, in opposition to Higher Criticism.

== Bibliography ==
- Anderson, Allan Heaton (2014). An Introduction to Pentecostalism: Global Charismatic Christianity (2nd ed.). Cambridge: Cambridge University Press.
- Edsor, Albert W (1964). George Jeffreys, man of God: The story of a phenomenal ministry. Ludgate Press.
- "Elim's Historic Timeline". www.elim.org.uk. Elim Pentecostal Church.
- Gee, Donald (1941). The Pentecostal Movement. Elim Publishing.
- Hudson, David Neil (1999). A schism and its aftermath : an historical analysis of denominational discerption in the Elim Pentecostal Church, 1939-1940 (Ph.D. thesis). King's College London.
- Jeffreys, George (1927). "A Golden Opportunity - to Study the Bible at Home" (PDF). The Elim Evangel. 8 (21): 322.
- Jeffreys, George (1932). Healing Rays. Clapham: Elim.
- Jeffreys, George (1944). Pentecostal Rays - The Baptism and Gifts of the Holy Spirit. Clapham: Elim.
- Jones, Maldwyn (21 May 2021). And They Came to Elim: An Official History of the Elim Pentecostal Movement in the UK. Instant Apostle. ISBN 9781912726387.
- Jones, Maldwyn (2 May 2023). And the came to Elim, Volume II. Worthing: Verite CM Ltd. ISBN 978-1914388439.
- Kane, Gregory (2015). "George Jeffreys, the Spirit of Christ, and Early Pentecostal Thinking on Spirit Reception". PNEUMA. 37 (1): 63–81. doi:10.1163/15700747-03701027. ISSN 0272-0965.
- Kay, William K. (17 February 2017). George Jeffreys: Pentecostal Apostle and Revivalist. CPT Press. ISBN 978-1-935931-61-4.
- Kay, William K (15 February 2018). "George Jeffreys: Pentecostal and Contemporary Implications". Religions. 9 (2): 60. doi:10.3390/rel9020060. hdl:10034/621099.
- Malcomson, Keith (2008). Pentecostal Pioneers Remembered. Xulon Press, Incorporated. ISBN 9781604776904.
