= More Miles Per Hour =

1979 studio album by John Miles

Studio album by John Miles
- Released: April 1979
- Recorded: November 1978 – January 1979
- Genre: Rock
- Length: 50:03
- Label: Decca
- Producer: Alan Parsons

John Miles chronology
Zaragon (1978)	More Miles Per Hour (1979)	Sympathy (1980)

More Miles Per Hour was the fourth solo album released by John Miles in 1979. As with Zaragon, the album didn't crack the U.K. top 40, and its singles failed to chart.
For this album, Miles reunited with producer Alan Parsons and orchestral arranger Andrew Powell, with whom he also collaborated on Rebel.
For the first time, Miles played some of the tracks ("Can't Keep a Good Man Down" and "We All Fall Down") before their release at the Great British Music Festival in Wembley in December 1978.
For the cover, Miles wanted a picture of himself as a pilot in front of a Concorde, but British Airports in London denied permission, so Miles had to fly to New York to do the shoot.

In 2008, the album was reissued with new liner notes and bonus tracks.

== Track listing ==
All Tracks written by Bob Marshall and John Miles

1. "Satisfied" 3:59
2. "It's Not Called Angel" 5:08
3. "Bad Blood" 4:16
4. "Fella in the Cellar" 6:43
5. "Can't Keep a Good Man Down" 3:48
6. "Oh Dear!" 4:10
7. "C'est La Vie" 4:27
8. "We All Fall Down" 6:57

Bonus tracks on 2008 reissue:

1. "Sweet Lorraine" (non album B-side of "Can't Keep a Good Man Down") – 3:02
2. "Don't Give Me Your Sympathy" (non album A-side) – 2:49
3. "If I Don't Need Loving" (non album B-side of "Don't Give Me Your Sympathy") – 4:44

== Personnel ==
- John Miles - lead vocals, keyboards, guitar
- Bob Marshall - bass
- Barry Black - drums
- Brian Chatton - keyboards
- Andrew Powell - orchestral arrangements
