= Play On (John Miles album) =

1983 solo album by John Miles

Studio album by John Miles
- Released: 1983
- Recorded: 1982
- Studio: Maison Rouge, London
- Genre: Rock
- Label: EMI
- Producer: Gus Dudgeon

John Miles chronology
Miles High (1981)	Play On (1983)	Transition (1985)

Play On is the sixth solo album by John Miles released in 1983 via EMI label.

== Overview ==
EMI promised that Miles would use a top producer and top session musicians for his second album for EMI.

Eventually they chose Gus Dudgeon who had worked with artists like Elton John, Chris Rea and Elkie Brooks. Originally, the album was planned to be released in 1982, but because Dudgeon was not available at the time, the release was delayed.

It was also the first time that drummer Barry Black and bassist Bob Marshall were not used on the album (although Marshall still wrote the songs with Miles). Instead they were replaced by session musicians. "The Right to Sing" was the first single released from the album and was written about the fact that record companies wanted to decide which songs Miles had to release and which direction he had to take.

Another single, the catchy track "Song For You" became a small worldwide hit and was used as a soundtrack in TV commercials for cigarette brand "Hollywood" in Brazil and few other countries.

"That's Rock 'n' Roll" was left off the album because it was too different, and was subsequently released as a B-side.

"Carrie" was covered by The Hollies on the b-side of the 1988 re-release of their cover version of He Ain't Heavy, He's My Brother and their compilation album Rarities. John Miles sang backing vocals on it.

On 23rd April 2024, which would have been John’s 75th birthday, his official Facebook page announced that Play On would be available for the first time on CD as part of a 3 CD set covering his albums from 1983 to 1993. The release date was set as 19 July 2024 & in addition would include the Transition & Upfront albums together with liner notes and all singles both A’s & B’s. A few days later Cherry Red released more information. https://www.cherryred.co.uk/john-miles-the-albums-1983-93-3cd-box-set

== Track listing ==
All songs written by Bob Marshall and John Miles

1. "Take Me to My Heaven"
2. "Song for You"
3. "It Wasn't Love at All"
4. "Ready to Spread Your Wings"
5. "I'll Never Do it Again"
6. "Heart of Stone"
7. "Home"
8. "Close Eyes and Count to Ten"
9. "Carrie"
10. "Right to Sing"

== Personnel ==
- John Miles - lead vocals, backing vocals, piano, guitar
- Martin Jenner - acoustic guitar, guitar
- Gus Dudgeon - tambourine on "The Right to Sing"
- Graham Jarvis - drums
- Paul Westwood - bass
- Pete Wingfield - electric piano, organ, piano, synthesizer, clavinet, backing vocals
- Duncan Mackay - synthesizer; vocoder on "Close Eyes Count to Ten"
- Frank Ricotti - percussion
- Jimmy Chambers, Katie Kissoon - backing vocals
- Jerry Donahue - electric guitar on "Take Me to My Heaven"
- Mel Collins - saxophone on "Take Me to My Heaven" and "Home"
- Paul Buckmaster - orchestral arrangement on "Ready to Spread Your Wings"
- Derek Wadsworth and Gus Dudgeon - arrangements on "Take Me to My Heaven" and "Heart of Stone"
- Chris Hunter, Derek Wadsworth, Dick Morrissey, Jeff Daly - brass on "Take Me to My Heaven" and "Heart of Stone"
- Bruce Baxter - orchestral arrangement on "The Right to Sing"
