= Upfront (John Miles album) =

1993 studio album by John Miles

Studio album by John Miles
- Released: 1993
- Genre: Rock
- Label: EMI
- Producer: Chris Lord-Alge

John Miles chronology
Transition (1985)	Upfront (1993)	Tom and Catherine (1999)

Upfront is the eighth solo album of John Miles, released in 1993. It was his first album in eight years, due to being involved in several other projects, such as an album with Jimmy Page, an album with Joe Cocker, singing several tracks on albums by the Alan Parsons Project and touring with Tina Turner.

It was also the first CD where bassist Bob Marshall did not play or co-write songs with Miles.

== Track listing ==
All tracks written by John Miles

1. "Everything's Ok"
2. "Can't Get Through"
3. "One More Day Without Love"
4. "Oh How the Years Go By"
5. "What Goes Around"
6. "Now That the Magic Has Gone"
7. "It's Such a Mystery"
8. "Body of My Brunette"
9. "For Ever and Ever"
10. "It's Not Over Yet"
11. "Chains and Wild Horses"
12. "Absent Hearts"
13. "Pale Spanish Moon"

== Personnel ==
- John Miles - lead vocals, guitar
- Ollie Marland - keyboards
- Jack Bruno - drums
- Neil Stubenhaus - bass
