= John Miles (musician) =

English rock singer-songwriter and musician (1949–2021)

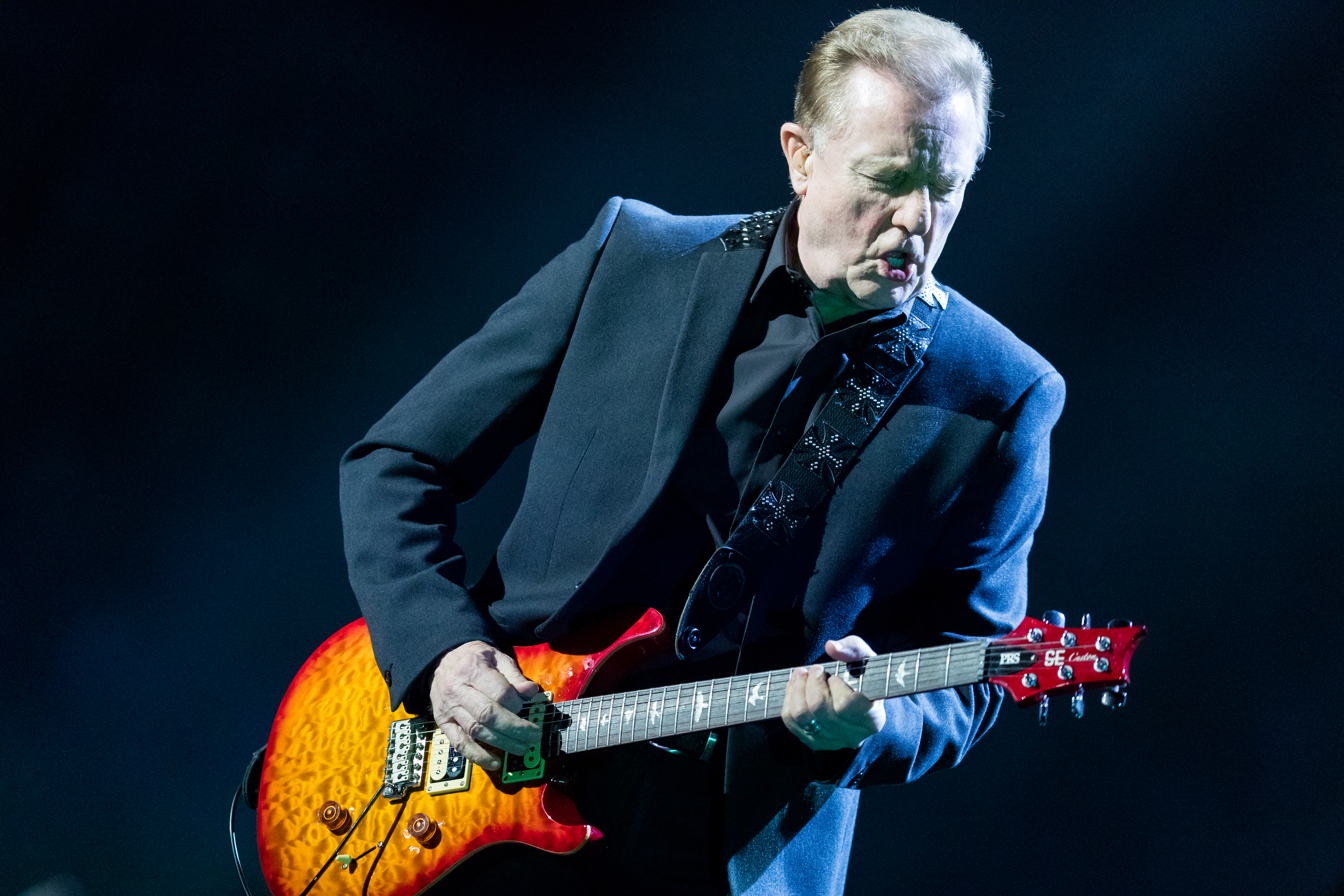
- Miles performing at the Night of the Proms in 2017 in Mannheim, Germany

Background information
- Born: John Errington; 23 April 1949; Jarrow, England
- Died: 5 December 2021 (aged 72) Newcastle upon Tyne, England
- Genre: Rock
- Occupations: Musician; songwriter; music director
- Instruments: Vocals; keyboards; guitar
- Years active: 1970–2021

John Miles (born John Errington; 23 April 1949 – 5 December 2021) was an English rock singer, guitarist and keyboard player best known for his 1976 top 3 UK hit single "Music", which won an Ivor Novello Award, and his frequent appearances at Night of the Proms. He won the "Outstanding Musical Achievement" award at the 2017 Progressive Music Awards. He released 10 albums from 1976 to 1999 and was a touring musician for Tina Turner from 1987 to 2009.

== Early life ==
Miles was born John Errington in Jarrow, County Durham, to Alec and Doris, attending St. Peters School before passing his eleven-plus exam and joining Jarrow Grammar School. While still a pupil at Jarrow Grammar School, Miles started guitar lessons in nearby Hebburn and was encouraged by his grammar school music teacher, Jimmy Joseph, to take up a career in music, but his first job after leaving school was making lavatory signs. Miles played in several local bands, including The John Miles Set, Derringers, The New Atlantians and The Urge before joining The Influence, which also included Paul Thompson, later the drummer with Roxy Music, and Vic Malcolm, later lead guitarist with Geordie. This outfit released the single "I Want to Live" (Orange Records, 1969). Following this, he formed The John Miles Set, with Bob Marshall and Dave Symonds before starting his solo career in 1971.

In 1972 Billboard magazine reported on a new distribution agreement between Orange Records and the larger Pye Records label: "Orange, the label offshoot of the Orange recording studios, will release John Miles' 'Come Away MeLinda' [sic] as its first record through Pye."

Other releases included those written by Australian writing duo Vanda & Young: "The World Belongs to Yesterday" (1972), "Yesterday Was Just the Beginning of My Life" (1972) and "One Minute Every Hour" (1973). It was while on a break on a Saturday stint at Peter Stringfellow's Leeds club that he started writing what became "Music". In 1972, the band appeared on the television series Opportunity Knocks.

== Career ==
=== Success ===
Miles signed a recording contract with the Decca UK label in 1975 and issued four albums: Rebel (1976) – No. 9 on the UK chart, Stranger in the City (1977) – No. 37 UK, Zaragon (1978) – No. 43 UK and More Miles Per Hour (1979) – No. 46 UK. Miles had the most success with singles and released a total of eighteen during this era, with four reaching the UK top 40. In addition to "Music", he charted in the UK with "Highfly" (1975) – No. 17, "Remember Yesterday" (1976) – No. 32, and "Slow Down" (1977) – No. 10. In 1975, the readers of the Daily Mirror voted Miles as Best Newcomer. Not long after "Music"'s release, Miles was described by Melody Maker as "the brightest, freshest force in British rock".

"Music" won Miles an Ivor Novello Award for Best Middle of the Road Song in 1977. Most of his songs were co-written with the bassist in his backing group, Bob Marshall.

At the peak of his success, in 1976 and 1977, Miles made several appearances on the weekly pop TV shows Supersonic and Top of the Pops. The debut album did receive some attention in the US. Two singles from the debut album reached the US Billboard Hot 100 chart: "Highfly" peaked at No. 68, followed by "Music", which stalled at No. 88. In Canada, "Highfly" reached No. 74, and "Slow Down" reached No. 68. However, "Music" reached No. 1 on the Dutch and Belgian charts and No. 4 on the Swiss charts. "Slow Down" was his biggest US chart hit, peaking at No. 2 on the disco chart, and at No. 34 on the Billboard Hot 100 in June 1977. It was later featured in the 1979 film Players, starring Ali MacGraw and Dean Paul Martin. The album Zaragon reached No. 3 on the Swedish and Portuguese charts. On his US tour to promote Zaragon, Billboard stated that "Miles boasts several strengths: solid vocals, sharp guitar play and strong material".

Miles opened for Elton John on his 1976 Louder Than Concorde (But Not Quite As Pretty) Tour of North America. Miles and his band also opened for other top artists during this period, including Fleetwood Mac, Aerosmith, Jethro Tull and the Rolling Stones. In 1978, Miles was invited to appear on the BBC Sight and Sound in Concert programme which aired simultaneously on BBC Radio 1 and BBC 2 on 11 March 1978.

=== Later career ===
The early success of Rebel tailed off so much that Ian Gilbey in Electronics & Music Maker wrote:

In the world of Rock music, there can be no greater travesty than the way John Miles' music has been ignored, especially by the weekly music press. Musical skill has never been high on their list of pre-requisites for stardom and as soon as John's fifteen minutes of fame had terminated in the mid-Seventies, the shutters came down with a resounding bang. 'Passe' and 'old-fashioned' were the usual glib diatribes flung insultingly in Mr. Miles' direction with every subsequent record release, yet to those prepared to listen, each and every album contained material that consolidated his status as an exceptional songwriting talent.

From 1985, Miles participated almost every year in the Night of the Proms, a series of concerts held yearly in Belgium, the Netherlands, Germany, Luxembourg, Poland, Denmark and the United States. Regularly there were also shows in Spain, France, Austria, Switzerland and Sweden. The concerts consist of a combination of pop music and popular classical music (often combined) and various well-known musicians and groups usually participate.

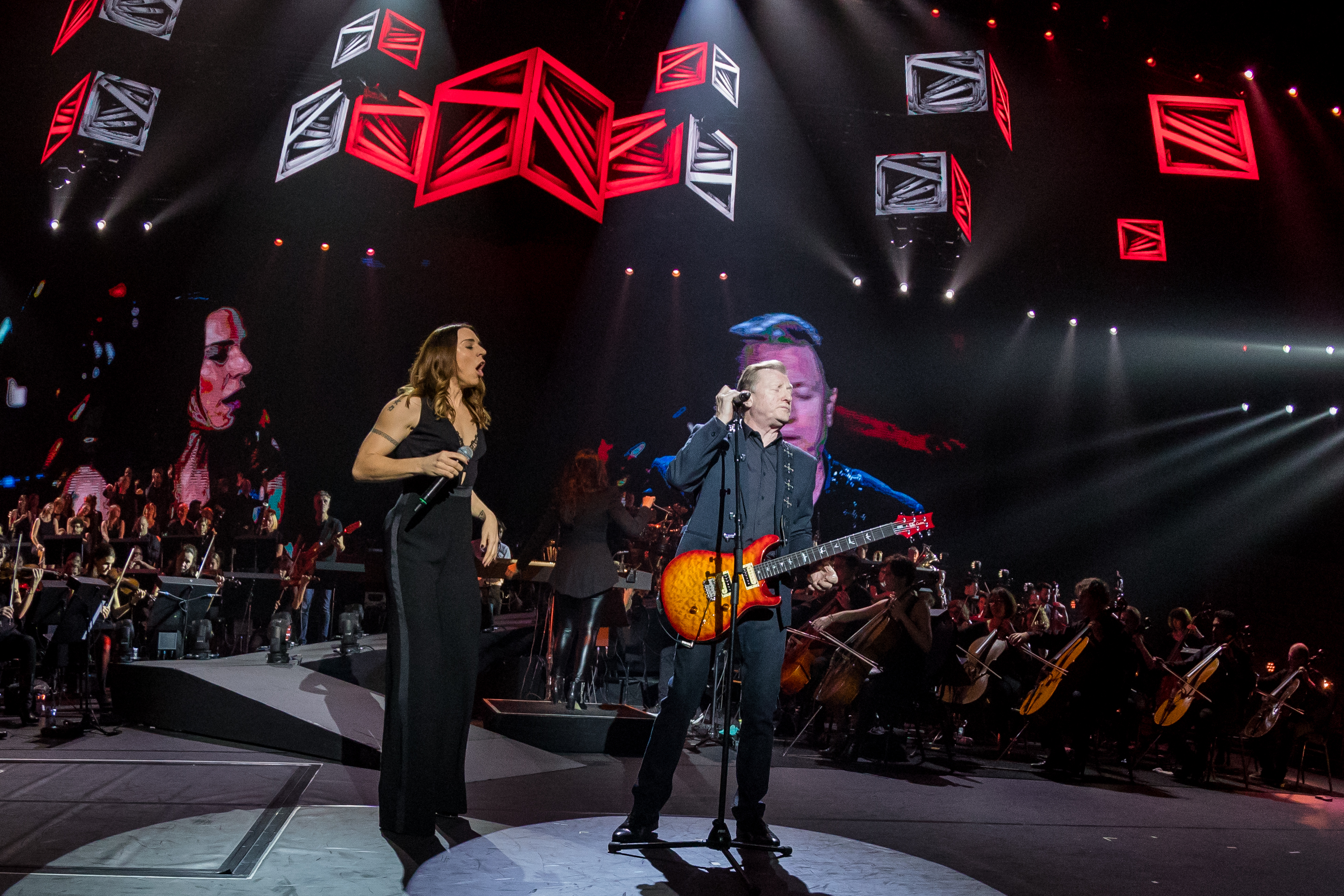
Miles with Mel C at the Night of the Proms, 2017

Miles always performed "Music", regarded as the anthem of the show, and also sang other songs with other artists. In 2009, the album The Best of John Miles at the Night of the Proms was released, which included "Music" and cover versions including "All by Myself", "Bohemian Rhapsody" and "It Was a Very Good Year".

Miles' 1986 album Transition was praised by Billboard, which said that "gutsy playing and even strength of material should assure wide exposure".

Miles toured with Tina Turner from 1987, playing keyboards, guitar and supporting vocals on every one of her tours, and played on several of her albums. He appeared on Jimmy Page's 1988 album Outrider and subsequent tour (his wide-ranging vocals allowed him to cover both Robert Plant and Paul Rodgers from Page's two previous bands), and played Hammond organ on Joe Cocker's album Night Calls (1992), with whom he toured for two years. In 1990, Miles participated in the UK heat of A Song for Europe with the song "Where I Belong", which came second.

Miles was a frequent guest vocalist on albums by the Alan Parsons Project, being featured on Tales of Mystery and Imagination (1976), Pyramid (1978), Stereotomy (1985), and Gaudi (1987), as well as on the Eric Woolfson album Freudiana (1990). He appeared on Andrea Bocelli's 1997 album Romanza on the tracks "Funiculi Funicula" and "Miserere".

His first DVD, John Miles – Live in Concert, was released in 2002. In 2007, Miles performed in Gelsenkirchen, Germany with German band Pur and sang two songs. On one of those songs, "Abenteuerland", Miles sang with Pur in German. The concert is available on the DVD Pur&Friends-Live-auf-Schalke-2007. In October 2008, Miles began touring once again with Tina Turner until May 2009.

The Olympiapark in Munich gave Miles a symbolic key to the park in 2015 as the performer who had opened the door the most times, and the moment was recorded on the Munich Olympic Walk of Stars.

In 2017, Miles was awarded an outstanding contribution to music award at the Progressive Rock awards.

In 2019, Miles starred in a flashmob performance of "Music" organized by Südwestrundfunk (SWR; Southwest Broadcasting), a regional public broadcasting corporation serving the southwest of Germany. It was held in the marketplace of Landau and involved more than 100 people including the members of the State Youth Orchestra of Rhineland Palatinate and 20 camera operators.

In 2020, Miles recorded a new version of "Music" remotely with the Antwerp Philharmonic 'Quarantine' Orchestra due to the cancellation of the Night of the Proms due to the COVID-19 pandemic.

=== Musicals ===
In 1998, Miles entered the world of stage musicals by creating the score for the adaption of Robert Westall's The Machine Gunners by Tom Kelly and Ken Reay. This was followed in 1999 with further collaboration with Tom Kelly on Tom and Catherine, the life story of the romantic writer Catherine Cookson and her husband Tom. Their next work was Dan Dare The Musical in 2003, with Miles writing the score for Cuddy's Miles by Arthur McKenzie and David Whitaker, which was about the Jarrow Marches with the character Cuddy being Miles' grandfather Cuthbert. In 2016, Miles and Kelly collaborated on Dolly Mixtures, a musical based on the story of eight women who set up a variety act when one of their husbands was diagnosed with cancer – later going on to raise £100,000 in the 1970s and 1980s.

== Personal life and death ==
Miles died after a short illness on 5 December 2021 at the age of 72 and was survived by his wife of nearly 50 years, Eileen, two children and two grandchildren. His son, John Miles Jr., is also a musician and played with groups Milk Inc., Sylver, the Urge and Fixate.

Alan Parsons wrote of Miles:

I am hugely saddened by the news that my good friend and musical genius John has passed. I am so very proud to have worked with him on some of the greatest vocal performances ever recorded, including of course 'Music', which as well as being a big hit internationally, became an anthem for the hugely popular "Night of the Proms" concerts. Whenever I invited John to sing on the Alan Parsons Project albums he always delivered magical and sensitive renditions. He will be greatly missed not only by his many friends and associates but also by the millions of fans who recognize his amazing talent. You will be missed.

Carl Huybrechts, one of the joint creators of Night of the Proms, said:

I've heard him play "Music" a thousand times. It always gave me goosebumps. With that huge orchestra there, it will always stay with me.

== Discography ==
Studio albums

- Rebel (1976)
- Stranger in the City (1977)
- Zaragon (1978)
- More Miles Per Hour (1979)
- Sympathy (1980)
- Miles High (1981)
- Play On (1983)
- Transition (1985)
- Upfront (1993)
- Tom and Catherine (1999)

== See also ==
- List of 1970s one-hit wonders in the United States
- List of artists under the Decca Records label
- List of performers on Top of the Pops
