= Rebel (John Miles album) =

Studio album by John Miles
- Released: March 1976
- Recorded: November–December 1975
- Studio: Abbey Road Studios, London
- Genre: Rock
- Length: 40:24
- Label: Decca, London
- Producer: Alan Parsons

John Miles chronology
Rebel (1976)	Stranger in the City (1977)

Rebel was the first solo album by British rock musician John Miles. It was his most successful album and contained the singles "Highfly" and "Music".

== History ==
When Miles signed to Decca, they introduced him to producer Alan Parsons in the summer of 1975 (Miles would later sing on several tracks on several albums of the Alan Parsons Project). The first song they recorded was "Highfly", which was released as a single, eventually reaching #17 in the U.K., #68 on the U.S. Billboard Hot 100 and #74 in Canada.

Because of the success of the single, plans were made to record a full album; this recording took place in November–December 1975 at Abbey Road Studios. The song "Music" was released, became an instant hit (reaching number 3 in the UK, number 88 in the United States) and is one of his most memorable songs. The album reached the lower level of the U.S. Billboard 200 albums chart, peaking at #171.

The album title was based on the album cover, on which he posed with a big gun on his shoulders, reminiscent of James Dean, who is considered a rebel. The pose with the gun is also identical to the one Martin Sheen does in the 1973 Terrence Malick film Badlands.
According to Miles, "Music" was written in half an hour and was originally meant to be a basis for other songs, but because of its distinctive character, it was developed as a complete song.

== Track listing ==
All tracks are written by Bob Marshall and John Miles, except where noted.

Side A
No.	Title	Writer(s)	Length
1.	"Music"	John Miles	5:58
2.	"Everybody Wants Some More"		3:38
3.	"Highfly"		3:53
4.	"You Have it All"		7:01

Side B
No.	Title	Writer(s)	Length
5.	"Rebel"		3:19
6.	"When You Lose Someone So Young"		4:35
7.	"Lady of My Life"	Miles	4:08
8.	"Pull the Damn Thing Down"		7:18
9.	"Music (Reprise)"	Miles	2:11

== Personnel ==
- John Miles – vocals, keyboards, guitar, synthesizer
- Bob Marshall – bass
- Barry Black – drums, percussion
- Andrew Powell – orchestral arrangements

== Charts ==
Chart (1976)	Position
Australia (Kent Music Report)	33
CAN RPM 100	34
US Billboard 200	171
