= To One in Paradise =

Single by the Alan Parsons Project

from the album Tales of Mystery and Imagination
- B-side: "The Cask Of Amontillado"
- Released: October 1976 (UK); March 1977 (US)
- Recorded: August 1975
- Length: 4:29 (album version); 3:59 (single version)
- Label: 20th Century
- Songwriters: Alan Parsons; Eric Woolfson
- Producer: Alan Parsons

The Alan Parsons Project singles chronology
"The Raven" (1976)	"To One in Paradise" (1976)	"I Wouldn't Want to Be Like You" (1977)

"To One in Paradise" is a song by the Alan Parsons Project. It is the final track on their debut album, Tales of Mystery and Imagination, which is a tribute to author and poet Edgar Allan Poe. Terry Sylvester sang lead vocals on the song, with the song's co-writers Alan Parsons and Eric Woolfson providing additional vocals. The song was released as the third and final single from Tales of Mysteries and Imagination and reached the Bubbling Under portion of the US Billboard Hot 100.

== Background ==
"To One in Paradise" was one of the first songs worked on for the Tales of Mystery and Imagination. Parsons and Woolfson had developed a demo of the song at Pathway Studios in Islington. A different version was then recorded in August 1975 at Studio 2 of Abbey Road Studios in London. Parsons described the song as "almost an epitaph to Poe."

During the sessions at Abbey Road Studios, the song was known as "Three Two One Parachute", a decision made by Parsons and Woolfson to obfuscate the song's subject matter so that the session musicians would not be privy to its premise. Ian Bairnson played the song's guitar arpeggios with a Badstone flanger and later commented in the 2016 liner notes of Tales of Mystery and Imagination that he "absolutely love[s] 'To One in Paradise'", adding that "it's got such a great vibe."

== Critical reception ==
Cashbox wrote that the song was characterised by a "mellow pace" with "sterling effects and extremely Beatle-like vocal parts and harmonies." They also believed that its melody would be appropriate for both AM and FM radio formats. Record World highlighted the song's "excellent vocal performance" and "lush production".

== Personnel ==
- Ian Bairnson – electric guitar, acoustic guitar
- David Paton – bass guitar, acoustic guitar
- Billy Lyall – Fender Rhodes, glockenspiel
- Stuart Tosh – drums
- Terry Sylvester – lead vocals
- Alan Parsons – additional vocals
- Eric Woolfson – additional vocals
- Jane Powell – backing vocals
- Westminster City School Boys Choir – choir
- Leonard Whiting – narration

== Chart performance ==
Chart (1976)	Peak position
US Billboard Bubbling Under Hot 100 Singles	8
