= Wizards of Waverly Place (soundtrack) =

Soundtrack album by Various artists
- Released: August 4, 2009
- Recorded: 2004–2009
- Genres: Soundtrack; children's music; pop; pop rock
- Length: 37:12
- Label: Walt Disney

Wizards of Waverly Place is the soundtrack album from the Disney Channel Original Series of the same name. The album was released as a physical CD, enhanced CD and digital on August 4, 2009, under Walt Disney Records. The album includes songs from and inspired by the television series and Wizards of Waverly Place: The Movie.

== Background ==
In an interview with Disney Channel's commercial-segment, Disney 365, Selena Gomez discussed her interpretations of the songs on the soundtrack saying: "Disappear is more of a romantic song. It's basically talking about how a girl likes a guy and they [she] don't want him to disappear, and then Magical is about casting a spell on a guy and this song, Magic, ties into Wizards of Waverly Place: The Movie". Although recorded for the episode of the same name, "Make It Happen" does not appear on the album.

== Critical reception ==
Professional ratings
Review scores
| Source | Rating |
|---|---|
| AllMusic | 3/5 stars |

In response to the soundtrack, Stephen Thomas Erlewine of AllMusic recognized Wizards for its "teen revamps of boomer classics that parents can enjoy too". He also stated that the album is "agreeable" and that Selena Gomez "inevitably stands out from the pack". However, Erlewine said: "the dang-awful version of America's "You Can Do Magic" by Drew Seeley is sunk by its hyper-claustrophobic rhythms, the biggest rearrangement of a tune here and easily the worst cut."

== Singles ==
"Magic" by Selena Gomez was released on July 21, 2009 as part of the Radio Disney iTunes Pass, serving as a promotional single for the soundtrack. "Magic" premiered on Radio Disney and a music video to Disney Channel on July 24. The song's music video has Gomez singing into a microphone with bright and flamboyant background, as well as including clips from Wizards of Waverly Place: The Movie. "Magic" debuted at no. 61 in the Billboard Hot 100 with 42,000 downloads.

Billie Eilish and her record-producer brother, Finneas, acknowledged a connection between her single "Bad Guy" and Gomez's "Everything Is Not What It Seems" in a Rolling Stone interview in December 2019.

== Track listing ==
| No. | Title | Writer(s) | Recording artist(s) | Length |
|---|---|---|---|---|
| 1. | "Disappear" | John Fields; William James "Bleu" McAuley III; Will Anderson | Selena Gomez | 3:39 |
| 2. | "Magical" | Leah Haywood; Daniel James; Shelly Peiken | Selena Gomez | 2:54 |
| 3. | "Magic" (originally by Pilot) | David Paton, William Lyall | Selena Gomez | 2:49 |
| 4. | "Strange Magic" (originally by Electric Light Orchestra) | Jeff Lynne | Steve Rushton | 3:20 |
| 5. | "Magic" (originally by the Cars) | Ric Ocasek | Honor Society | 3:51 |
| 6. | "Every Little Thing She Does Is Magic" (originally by the Police) | Sting | Mitchel Musso | 3:44 |
| 7. | "Magic Carpet Ride" (originally by Steppenwolf) | John Kay, Rushton Moreve | KSM | 2:57 |
| 8. | "Magic" (originally by Olivia Newton-John) | John Farrar | Meaghan Martin | 4:08 |
| 9. | "You Can Do Magic" (originally by America) | Russ Ballard | Drew Seeley | 3:33 |
| 10. | "Some Call It Magic" | Matthew Gerrard; Robbie Nevil; Raven-Symoné | Raven-Symoné | 3:13 |
| 11. | "Do You Believe in Magic" (originally by the Lovin' Spoonful) | John Sebastian | Aly & AJ | 2:13 |
| 12. | "Everything Is Not What It Seems^{[a]}" (Series Theme Song) | Bradley Hamilton; John Adair; Ryan Elder; Stephen Hampton | Selena Gomez | 0:51 |

Notes

- ^{^[a]} Despite the printed track listing included on the previously released compilation Disney Channel Playlist, and the performed lyrics matching to the track name, physical and digital editions of the Wizards of Waverly Place soundtrack label "Everything Is Not What It Seems" as "Everything Is Not as It Seems." The 2013 Disney Classics CD box set and digital compilation also uses the "Everything Is Not as It Seems" title.
- Bonus enchanted content included on the physical CD for Wizards of Waverly Place includes exclusive behind-the-scenes interviews with Gomez and also the music video for "Magic".

== Charts and sales ==
The album debuted at No. 24 on the Billboard 200, selling 18,000 units in its first week, and has sold over 106,000 copies in the U.S.

| Chart (2009) | Peak position |
|---|---|
| US Billboard 200 | 24 |
| US Top Soundtracks | 4 |
| US Kid Albums | 3 |
| Mexican Albums Top 100 | 32 |
| Norway Albums Top 40 | 27 |
| UK Soundtrack Albums | 1 |

== International release ==
The soundtrack was released in the UK on October 5, 2009, although not stocked up in most of the UK, and in Mexico released on August 14, 2009.

== Personnel ==
Credits

- John Adair - producer
- Michael Bruno (member of Honor Society) - vocals, guitar
- Kate Cabebe (member of KSM) - drums
- Katie Cecil (member of KSM) - vocals, guitar
- Shelby Cobra (member of KSM) - vocals
- Ryan Elder - Producer
- John Fields - Producer, engineer, mixing
- Steve Gerdes - art direction
- Matthew Gerrard - producer, mixing
- Selena Gomez - vocals
- Paul David Hager - mixing
- Steve Hampton - producer
- Daniel James - mixing
- Andrew Lee (member of Honor Society) - vocals, keyboard, bass
- Jon Lind - A&R
- Brian Malouf - executive producer, mixing
- Stephen Marcussen - mastering
- Meaghan Martin - vocals
- Dani Markman - A&R
- William J. McAuley III - producer, engineer
- Sophia Melon (member of KSM) - vocals, bass
- Alyson Michalka - vocals
- Amanda Michalka - vocals
- Mitchel Musso - vocals
- Alexander Noyes (member of Honor Society) - drums
- Shae Padilla (member of KSM) - guitar
- Jason Pennock - mixing
- Jason Rosen (member of Honor Society) - vocals, guitar, keyboard
- Steve Rushton - vocals
- Curt Schneider - producer
- Drew Seeley - vocals
- Raven-Symoné - vocals
- Anabel Sinn - design
- Louie Teran - mastering
- Kent Verderico - mixing
- Steve Vincent - music executive
- Trey Vittetoe - producer
