= (The System of) Dr. Tarr and Professor Fether =

Single by the Alan Parsons Project

from the album Tales of Mystery and Imagination
- B-side: "A Dream Within a Dream"
- Released: July 1976
- Recorded: September 1975
- Studio: Abbey Road Studios
- Length: 4:12 (LP); 3:20 (single)
- Label: 20th Century (US); Charisma (UK)
- Songwriters: Alan Parsons; Eric Woolfson
- Producer: Alan Parsons

The Alan Parsons Project singles chronology
"(The System of) Dr. Tarr and Professor Fether" (1976)	"The Raven" (1976)

"(The System of) Dr. Tarr and Professor Fether" is a song by the Alan Parsons Project. It first appeared on their debut album, Tales of Mystery and Imagination: Edgar Allan Poe. The single reached number 37 on the US Billboard Hot 100 and number 62 in Canada. John Miles provided the song's lead vocals.

== Background ==
As with the other songs on the album, "(The System of) Dr. Tarr and Professor Fether" is based on a story by American author Edgar Allan Poe, After the band agreed to write a concept album around the work of Poe, Parsons suggested the idea of writing a song around Poe's "The System of Doctor Tarr and Professor Fether" short story. In September 1975, the band recorded the song at Abbey Road Studios in London. The song's ending features an applause track and an interpolation of "The Raven", another track included on Tales of Mystery and Imagination. For the 1987 reissue of Tales of Mystery and Imagination, Parsons overdubbed a cathedral organ on "(The System of) Dr. Tarr and Professor Fether".

The song does not appear on either The Best of the Alan Parsons Project or The Best of the Alan Parsons Project, Volume 2, as the band moved from 20th Century Records to Arista after the release of Tales of Mystery and Imagination. It appears on the American version of the 1997 2 CD Definitive Collection.

== Critical reception ==
Billboard characterised "(The System of) Dr. Tarr and Professor Fether" as a "strangely inviting single" that "cooks with an unusual lighthearted ominous quality." Cashbox described the song "a dynamic and driving cut, with the drums, at times, accenting individual words. They also thought that the vocals and "almost symphonic" arrangement were "top notch". Record World felt that the song "held up well" with the "elegant" vocals of John Miles.

== Personnel ==
- John Miles — lead vocals, guitars
- Jack Harris — backing vocals
- Ian Bairnson — guitars
- David Paton — bass guitar
- Eric Woolfson — keyboards
- Billy Lyall — piano
- Alan Parsons — cathedral organ (1987 reissue version), recorders
- Stuart Tosh — drums, percussion
- Abbey Road Effects Library – crowd noises

== Charts ==
Charts (1976)	Peak position
Canada Top Singles (RPM)	62
US Billboard Hot 100	37
