= I Wouldn't Want to Be Like You =

- German release artwork

Single by The Alan Parsons Project

from the album I Robot
- B-side: "Nucleus"
- Released: August 1977
- Recorded: December 1976 – March 1977
- Studio: Abbey Road Studios
- Genre: Progressive pop; disco-rock; funk
- Length: 3:23 (album version); 3:12 (single version)
- Label: Arista
- Songwriters: Alan Parsons; Eric Woolfson
- Producer: Alan Parsons

The Alan Parsons Project singles chronology
"To One in Paradise" (1976)	"I Wouldn't Want to Be Like You" (1977)	"Don't Let It Show" (1977)

Music video
- "I Wouldn't Want to Be Like You" on YouTube

"I Wouldn't Want to Be Like You" is a song by the British progressive rock duo The Alan Parsons Project, featured on their 1977 album I Robot. Written by band leaders Alan Parsons and Eric Woolfson, "I Wouldn't Want to Be Like You" was sung by pop singer Lenny Zakatek, who would go on to sing many of the band's songs. In the United States the song reached No. 36 on the Billboard Hot 100. It also reached the top 30 in Canada.

== Background ==
Parsons and Woolfson had differing views on the lyrical interpretation of the song: Parsons interpreted the song as being from the perspective of a man talking to a machine and Woolfson believing that it was instead about a machine talking to a man. Woolfson remarked that "both points of view are equally valid, or equally invalid." When working the song, Parsons applied some tape echo to the guitar track. An earlier mix of the song without Ian Bairnson's guitar solo was included on the 30th anniversary remastered edition of I Robot.

According to Lenny Zakatek, Woolfson had asked him to perform lead vocals on the song. Zakatek recorded his parts in Studio 2 of Abbey Road Studios. He had initially requested some additional time to learn the song, but Parsons denied this request and insisted that he complete the song the day of his arrival. After Zakatek completed three takes, he recalled that his efforts were met with little fanfare from those in the control room, saying that "there was nobody clapping in the studio [or] high fiving". Parsons then beckoned Zakatek to the control room to play the track for him. When Zakatek requested that he record a final part, Parsons initially demurred, believing that Zakatek's parts were already sufficient, but eventually acquiesced. Zakatek then used the fourth take to record some vocal ad libs at the end of the song.

In 1977, the song was released as the lead single from the group's second album, I Robot. The song peaked at No. 36 on the U.S. Billboard Hot 100 and No. 22 on the Canadian chart. In the United Kingdom, the song received some airplay on Beacon Radio and Capital Radio.

== Critical reception ==
Record World called "I Wouldn't Want to Be Like You" a "percussive, r&b-tinged tune" with "disco potential" and also highlighted the song's guitar solo. Billboard listed "I Wouldn't Want to Be Like You" as one of the best songs on I Robot. In a retrospective review, Stephen Thomas Erlewine of AllMusic characterised the song as a "tense, paranoid neo-disco rocker that was the APP's breakthrough" and "the closest thing to a concise pop song" on I Robot.

== Personnel ==
- Alan Parsons – production, engineering, composer
- Eric Woolfson – keyboards, composer, lyrics
- Ian Bairnson – guitars
- David Paton – bass
- Stuart Tosh – drums
- Lenny Zakatek – vocals

== Charts ==
Charts (1977)	Peak position
Canada Top Singles (RPM)	22
Canada Adult Contemporary (RPM)	34
Spain (AFE)	25
US Billboard Hot 100	36

== In other media ==
The song was featured in the initial and subsequent releases of Grand Theft Auto V on the game's classic rock radio station Los Santos Rock Radio. In the third and final of the game's optional endings, 'The Third Way', the song will always play once the player enters Devin Weston’s car after placing him in the boot.
