= Don't Let It Show =

Single by The Alan Parsons Project

from the album I Robot
- B-side: "Nucleus"
- Released: November 1977
- Recorded: December 1976 – March 1977
- Studio: Abbey Road, London
- Length: 4:24 (album version); 3:37 (single version)
- Label: Arista
- Songwriters: Alan Parsons; Eric Woolfson
- Producer: Alan Parsons

The Alan Parsons Project singles chronology
"I Wouldn't Want to Be Like You" (1977)	"Don't Let It Show" (1977)	"Day After Day (The Show Must Go On)" (1978)

"Don't Let It Show" is a song recorded by the Alan Parsons Project for their 1977 album I Robot, where it was included as the fifth track on the album. It was written by Alan Parsons and Eric Woolfson and features Dave Townsend on lead vocals. "Don't Let It Show" was released as a single and charted in both Canada and the United States.

== Background ==
Woolfson mentioned that the lyrics to "Don't Let It Show" were "both total obvious and completely obscure" and had "so many layers of meaning". He took inspiration from the work of Isaac Asimov, where he identified his themes of hiding one's emotions from an omniscient observer.

So much of what I've read in the Asimov stories involve the necessity to have a poker face – to not give away too much of your emotions or feelings. There was a Big Brother out there who was observing, drawing lessons, and second guessing if you gave away too much.

— Eric Woolfson

The song begins with an organ and vocals and later segues into a second section with a different feel. Parsons was adamant about recording a real pipe organ on "Don't Let It Show" rather than a synthesiser and considered searching for a suitable organ in churches. He instead located a portable electronic organ at Abbey Road Studios and rented the instrument, which Parsons thought sounded "pretty convincing". Woolfson ultimately played the organ part found on the intro. The original idea was to open the song with an instrumental passage of eight cellos playing different parts, which Woolfson thought was "a complete disaster". Andrew Powell created the orchestral arrangement that appeared on the final recording, which also included a piccolo trumpet part played by John Wallace.

== Release ==
"Don't Let It Show" was released as a single in November 1977, with Arista Records promoting the single in Radio and Records as "the single you asked for". Record World reviewed the single in its 26 November 1977 edition of the publication, calling it an "uplifting ballad, one that has the makings of a standard." The single was later added to the playlists of several radio stations across North America, including WDRQ, WOKY, CKLW, and KBEQ-FM. The song debuted on the US Billboard Hot 100 on 17 December 1977 and peaked at No. 92 in January 1978, spending a total of four weeks on the listing. The song performed better on the US Cashbox charts, where it peaked at No. 65 on its seventh week on the charts. On the Canadian RPM singles chart, "Don't Let It Show" debuted at No. 98 on the listing for the week of 17 December 1977. It later peaked at No. 71 during its fifth week on the chart.

Pat Benatar covered the song in 1979 for her debut solo album, In the Heat of the Night. Reviewing the song for Billboard, Jim McCullaugh wrote that the song "demonstrates the kind of emotion Benatar can inject into her voice", and expressed his belief that it was "effective and recorded well." Parsons had not met with Benatar prior to her rendition of "Don't Let It Show". They later interacted with each other after the release of her the cover, which Parsons brought up during the discussion. He recounted in a 2021 interview that Benatar enjoyed covering the song and thought she was a "nice lady" from their conversation.

== Personnel ==
- Dave Townsend – vocals
- Ian Bairnson – guitar
- David Paton – bass
- Eric Woolfson – organ
- Stuart Tosh – drums, percussion
- John Wallace – piccolo trumpet
- Andrew Powell – orchestral arrangements and conducting

== Charts ==
Charts (1977–1978)	Peak position
Canada Top Singles (RPM)	71
US Billboard Hot 100	92
US Cashbox Top 100	65
