= The Raven (song) =

Single by the Alan Parsons Project

from the album Tales of Mystery and Imagination
- B-side: "The Fall of the House of Usher" (prelude)
- Released: September 1976
- Genre: Progressive rock; funk rock
- Length: 3:43
- Label: 20th Century
- Songwriters: Alan Parsons; Eric Woolfson
- Producer: Alan Parsons

The Alan Parsons Project singles chronology
"(The System of) Dr. Tarr and Professor Fether" (1976)	"The Raven" (1976)	"To One in Paradise" (1976)

"The Raven" is a song by the Alan Parsons Project, recorded in April 1976 at Mama Jo's Studio, North Hollywood, Los Angeles. It is the second track on their debut album, Tales of Mystery and Imagination, which is a tribute to author and poet Edgar Allan Poe. The song's lyrics are based on Poe's poem of the same name and were written by Alan Parsons and Eric Woolfson. It was also released as a single in North America and charted on the US Billboard Hot 100.

== Background ==
Eric Woolfson wrote "The Raven" before he met Alan Parsons, having demoed the song in the early 1970s with Rick Westwood and Dave Munden of The Tremeloes. On the demo, Woolfson sang lead vocals and played keyboards. This song, along with other demoed around this time, were rolled into Tales of Mystery and Imagination once Woolfson and Parsons agreed to create an album based on the work of Edgar Allan Poe.

"The Raven" was one the first songs to use a vocoder developed by as manufactured by EMI Central Research Laboratories, which was used to process Alan Parsons' voice. Parsons used the vocoder due to his belief that the song should feature a "non-human voice". It was one of the few songs in the band's discography to feature Parsons as a vocalist, who commented that he "only sang through necessity". At the time Parsons used the vocoder, he felt that the device was "a very cumbersome thing that was very much in its early stages". Leonard Whiting performed the lead vocals for the remainder of the song, with Eric Woolfson providing backing vocals with Bob Hughes and the English Chorale.

For the song's backing track, Parsons brought the band Ambrosia into the recording studio to provide the instrumentation, having previously worked with the band on their second studio album. Parsons recalled that he and Woolfson opted not to inform the session musicians about the song's subject matter during the recording sessions and attempted to conceal its meaning by referring to the song as "The Raver" during this time. David Paton, who participated in the album's recording sessions, had a different recollection of how the song title was presented, saying that "sometimes the song titles would give things away. You'd see something like 'The Raven' and think 'Well I know what that is'."

According to the 2016 liner notes for the box set edition of Tales of Mystery and Imagination, the recording tape used for "The Raven" had become nearly transparent by the end of the recording sessions due to the number of overdubs that were completed.

== Release ==
"The Raven" was the second single released from Tales of Mystery and Imagination. It peaked at No. 80 on the US Billboard Hot 100 chart during the week of 30 October 1976 and spent a total of four weeks on the chart.

The song does not appear on either The Best of the Alan Parsons Project or The Best of the Alan Parsons Project, Volume 2, as the band moved from 20th Century Records to Arista after the release of Tales of Mystery and Imagination. It appears on the American version of the 1997 2-CD Definitive Collection and the 2007 collection The Essential Alan Parsons Project.

On the 1987 reissued version of Tales of Mystery and Imagination, the song contains a guitar solo by Ian Bairnson near the end of the song. Bairnson recorded his guitar solo digitally but otherwise used the same equipment from the original recording sessions. He commented that the guitar solo "was quite logical", since "there was space for it".

The choral band Gregorian covered "The Raven" on their 2004 release The Dark Side.

== Critical reception ==
Cashbox highlighted the song's "synthesized lyrics" and how the song "slowly rises to a crescendo". Record World wrote that "The mystery and imagination of the track is inherent in its sound." Mike DeGagne of AllMusic thought that the addition of a choir "add[ed] a distinct flair to its chamber-like sound".

== B-side ==
The B-side of "The Raven" is "The Fall of the House of Usher" prelude. "The Fall of the House of Usher" is an instrumental suite that runs more than fifteen minutes and takes up most of side two of Tales of Mystery and Imagination, however, the prelude is trimmed down to 5:59. Although uncredited, the prelude is taken from the opera fragment "La chute de la maison Usher" by Claude Debussy, which was composed between 1908 and 1917.

== Personnel ==
Original (1976)

- Burleigh Drummond, Stuart Tosh — drums
- Bob Howes and the English Chorale — choir vocals
- Christopher North — keyboards
- David Pack — guitars
- Alan Parsons — opening lead vocals (using EMI vocoder)
- Andrew Powell — conducted and arranged orchestra
- Joe Puerta — bass guitar
- Leonard Whiting — lead vocals
- Eric Woolfson — backing vocals, keyboards

Reissue (1987)

- Ian Bairnson — lead guitar solo

== Chart performance ==
Chart (1976)	Peak position
US Billboard Hot 100	80
