= Jack Harris (musician) =

British singer (born 1951)

Jack Harris (born 3 October 1951, Shoreditch, Hackney, London) is an English vocalist known for his work with the British progressive rock band, The Alan Parsons Project. He sang lead vocals on "Day After Day (The Show Must Go On)" on the album, I Robot (1977), and the falsetto-like single "Pyramania" taken from the Grammy nominated Pyramid (1978). Capable of singing in both high and low registers, Harris also sang backing vocals on the band's debut release Tales of Mystery and Imagination (1976), including the deep voice alongside John Miles on their debut single "(The System of) Dr. Tarr and Professor Fether", as well as the choir-like voice behind Arthur Brown on "The Tell-Tale Heart".

He was previously signed to Decca Records as a solo artist. A regular collaborator of Ian Bairnson, his single "Sail Away", released in 1975, was produced by Alan Parsons and featured all the members of Pilot. He later appeared on Pilot's "Ten Feet Tall" from their final album Two's A Crowd (1977). Later that year "Sail Away" was re-released.

He is a first cousin of Ron "Chopper" Harris.
