= Tales of Mystery and Imagination (Alan Parsons Project album) =

1976 debut studio album

Studio album by The Alan Parsons Project
- Released: April 1976
- Recorded: July 1975 – January 1976
- Studios: Abbey Road, London; Mama Jo's, Hollywood; Kingsway Hall, London
- Genres: Progressive rock; art rock; symphonic rock
- Length: 40:34 (1976)/42:38 (1987)
- Labels: Charisma; 20th Century
- Producer: Alan Parsons

The Alan Parsons Project chronology
Tales of Mystery and Imagination (1976)	I Robot (1977)

Alternative cover

Singles from Tales of Mystery and Imagination
- 1. "(The System of) Dr. Tarr and Professor Fether" Released: July 1976; 2. "The Raven" Released: September 1976 (US); 3. "To One in Paradise" Released: October 1976 (UK)

Tales of Mystery and Imagination (Edgar Allan Poe) is the debut studio album by British rock duo the Alan Parsons Project. It was released in April 1976 in the United Kingdom and Ireland by Charisma Records and 20th Century Records in the rest of the world. The lyrical and musical themes of the album, which are retellings of horror stories and poetry by Edgar Allan Poe, attracted a cult audience. The title of the album is taken from the title of a collection of Poe's macabre stories of the same name.

Musicians featured on the album include vocalists Arthur Brown of The Crazy World of Arthur Brown on "The Tell Tale Heart", John Miles on "The Cask of Amontillado" and "(The System of) Dr. Tarr and Professor Fether", and Terry Sylvester of The Hollies on "To One in Paradise". The complete line-up of bands Ambrosia and Pilot play on the record, along with keyboardist Francis Monkman of Curved Air and Sky.

Tales of Mystery and Imagination peaked at No. 38 on Billboard's Pop Albums chart. The song "(The System of) Doctor Tarr and Professor Fether" peaked at No. 37 on the Pop Singles chart, and No. 62 in Canada.

== Background ==
The impetus for the album derived from Parsons's and Woolfson's mutual appreciation of Edgar Allan Poe's literary work. When the band presented the album concept to Russ Regan of 20th Century Records, the album comprised a few songs from Woolfson, with additional material forthcoming and yet to be completed. Regan advised the band not to involve the efforts of high profile musicians and instead encouraged them to prioritise people that would be most compatible with the source material.

"The Raven" features actor Leonard Whiting on lead vocals, with Alan Parsons performing vocals through an EMI vocoder, which was manufactured by EMI Central Research Laboratories and stored in Abbey Road Studios. Parsons described the device as "a very cumbersome thing that was very much in its early stages."

Parsons connected with Arthur Brown through a mutual contact and initially worried that Brown would be an unsuitable fit for "The Tell Tale Heart". In a 2019 interview, Parsons recounted that Brown began humming the track and then insisted that he was ready to record. Parsons' concerns were allayed once Brown recorded his vocal track.

The prelude section of "The Fall of the House of Usher", although uncredited, is taken verbatim from the opera fragment "La chute de la maison Usher" by Claude Debussy which was composed between 1908 and 1917. During the recording sessions, Parsons and Woolfson took trip to Paris, where they obtained the original score for Debussy's composition.

"The Fall of the House of Usher" is an instrumental suite that runs more than 15 minutes and takes up most of Side 2 of the recording. The band was interested in incorporating sound effects from a rain storm and habitually checked weather forecasts to determine when the next storm would occur. At certain points during the recording sessions, the two peeked outside the studio to check if the weather reports were inaccurate. The two ultimately recorded what Claude Hall of Billboard described as "one of the biggest electrical storms in Hampstead", and included these sound effects on the album.

The album was previewed in its entirety at the Griffith Observatory in Los Angeles, which also included a planetary light show that accompanied the audio. A set of color wheels were projected onto the ceiling, which was augmented with various presentation slides associated with each song on the album. Parsons and Woolfson also provided explanations on the album's concept and development through a one-hour radio show.

== Artwork ==
The album's cover art was made by Hipgnosis. Storm Thorgerson said that Eric Woolfson and Parsons wanted a "classy" design, including a book of lyrics, lengthy credits, and a chronology of Poe's life. This artwork was used in some promotional materials, including a billboard displayed on Sunset Boulevard. Thorgerson described the recurring image of the "taped" man:

Poe was preoccupied with entombment. Many of his characters have been incarcerated in some form or other – in coffins, brick walls, or under floorboards. We came up with the 'taped' man – a mummy-like figure who is wrapped, not in bandages, but in 2" recording tape. This motif is partially horror-like, as well as being 'entombed', and the 2" tape appropriately suggests that the album is done by a producer in a studio, as opposed to a band recording material they will play on stage. Although the clients were intrigued by this idea they did not desire a pictorial cover but preferred instead a precise graphic representation. The narrow strip of illustration from George [Hardie] shows a long shadow of the taped man.

The booklet (attached to the inside of the cover) is composed of photos related to the songs, and line drawings that explore the taped man as he thrashes about in his restricted world and strives to unravel himself. The illustrated capital letters continue the idea. The layout and drawings are by Colin Elgie. The sleeve is one of our better attempts at combining photographs and illustration.

== Reception ==
Professional ratings
Review scores
Source	Rating
AllMusic	4.5/5 stars
Rolling Stone	(mixed)
Mojo	4/5 stars

Critical reaction to the album was mixed. Billboard reviewed the album in the 24 April 1976 edition of the publication and called it "a worthy blend of European rock and symphonic sounds." They believed that side one of the LP possessed the superior material with their "catchy hooks" and that Arthur Brown provided the best vocal performance on the album. Record World referred to the album as an "elaborate package" that was "a considerable accomplishment for Parsons, Eric Woolfson and Andrew Powell."

Rolling Stone's Billy Altman concluded it did not completely accurately reproduce Poe's tension and macabre fear, ending by saying "devotees of Gothic literature will have to wait for someone with more of the macabre in their blood for a truer musical reading of Poe's often terrifying works." Nonetheless, the album has still garnered somewhat of a cult status amongst Alan Parsons Project fans. In July 2010, the album was named as one of Classic Rock magazine's "50 Albums That Built Prog Rock".

== Reissues ==
In 1987, Parsons completely remixed the album, including additional keyboard and guitar passages and narration (by Orson Welles), as well as updating the production style to include heavy reverb and the gated reverb snare drum sound. Parsons also made the end of side A segue into the start of side B due to the remix of the album being released when CDs were commercially available, thus no need to stop playback to change sides. The CD liner notes mention that Welles never met Parsons or Eric Woolfson, but sent a tape to them of the performance shortly after the album was manufactured in 1976.

In 1994, Mobile Fidelity Sound Lab (MFSL) released the original 1976 version on CD (UDCD-606).

In 2007, a deluxe edition released by Universal Music included both the 1976 and the 1987 versions remastered by Alan Parsons during 2006 with eight additional bonus tracks.

In 2016, a 40th Anniversary Edition 3CD/1BD/2-LP box set was released, featuring a book, both 2007 Deluxe Edition CDs, a third disc with demos, outtakes, and other tracks, a 45 RPM 2-LP set of the original album with bonus tracks, and a Blu-ray featuring a 5.1 surround sound version of the album remixed by Alan Parsons in 2016.

== Track listing ==
All tracks are written by Eric Woolfson and Alan Parsons except "The Fall of the House of Usher" by Woolfson, Parsons, and Andrew Powell. Timings from 2007 remaster of 1976 original album.

Side one
No.	Title	Lead vocals	Length
1.	"A Dream Within a Dream"	Instrumental	3:41
2.	"The Raven"	Alan Parsons, Leonard Whiting	3:58
3.	"The Tell-Tale Heart"	Arthur Brown (additional vocals: Jack Harris)	4:42
4.	"The Cask of Amontillado"	John Miles (additional vocals: Terry Sylvester)	4:28
5.	"(The System of) Dr. Tarr and Professor Fether"	John Miles (additional vocals: Jack Harris)	4:14

Side two
No.	Title	Lead vocals	Length
1.	"The Fall of the House of Usher": "Prelude" – 5:52; "Arrival" – 2:41; "Intermezzo" – 1:03; "Pavane" – 4:34; "Fall" – 0:52"	Instrumental	15:02
2.	"To One in Paradise"	Terry Sylvester (additional vocals: Eric Woolfson, Alan Parsons)	4:29
Total length:			40:34

Orson Welles' narration does not appear on the original 1976 mix of the album. It does, however, on the 1987 remix: specifically on "A Dream Within a Dream", and on the extended Prelude of "The Fall of the House of Usher".

=== 2007 deluxe edition ===
Disc 1: Tracks 1–11, original album in original 1976 mix

12. "The Raven" (original demo)
13. "Edgar" (demo of an unreleased track)
14. "Orson Welles Radio Spot"
15. "Interview with Alan Parsons and Eric Woolfson" (1976)

Disc 2: Tracks 1–11, original album in 1987 remix

12. "Eric's Guide Vocal Medley"
13. "Orson Welles Dialogue"
14. "Sea Lions in the Departure Lounge" (sound effects and experiments)
15. "GBH Mix" (unreleased experiments)

=== 2016 40th Anniversary Edition ===
Disc 1: Original album in original 1976 mix + 2007 Bonus Tracks

Disc 2: Original album in 1987 remix + 2007 Bonus Tracks

Disc 3: Previously Unreleased Bonus Material

1. "Album Launch at Los Angeles Planetarium - Introduction by Warren Duffy"
2. "A Dream Within a Dream" (Piano Takes)
3. "A Dream Within a Dream" (Recorder Takes)
4. "A Dream Within a Dream/The Raven" (Early Mix with Eric Woolfson on Vocoder)
5. "The Raven" (Outtake and Extended Jam)
6. "The Tell-Tale Heart" (Eric Woolfson Guide Vocal)
7. "The Cask of Amontillado" (Rough Mix – Piano and Backing Vocals)
8. "The Cask of Amontillado" (Eric Woolfson and Alan Parsons Guide Vocals)
9. "Doctor Tarr and Professor Fether" (Early Rough Mix)
10. "Doctor Tarr and Professor Fether" (Vocal Take)
11. "Doctor Tarr and Professor Fether" (Eric Woolfson Guide Vocal)
12. "Prelude" (Orchestral Take 19)
13. "Pavane" (Experimenting & Take 1)
14. "To One in Paradise" (Rough Mix)
15. Interview with Alan and Eric (London, August 1987)

== Personnel ==
Track numbers in parentheses.

- Alan Parsons – EMI vocoder (2), Projectron synthesizer (3, 7, 10), recorder (5), additional vocals (11), synthesizer (3–4 on 1987 remix), cathedral organ (5 on 1987 remix), producer, engineer
- Eric Woolfson – keyboards (1–3, 5, 7), backing vocals (2, 4), harpsichord (4), organ (7), additional vocals (11), synthesizer (9 on 1987 remix), executive producer
- Andrew Powell – orchestral arrangement (2–4, 6, 8, 10), orchestral conductor (2–4, 6, 8, 10), keyboards (7), organ (9)
- Francis Monkman – organ (7), harpsichord (9)
- Billy Lyall – keyboards (1, 3), recorder (1), piano (4–5), Fender Rhodes electric piano (11), glockenspiel (11)
- Christopher North – keyboards (2)
- Orson Welles – narration (1 and 6 on 1987 remix)
- Leonard Whiting – lead vocals (2), narration (11)
- Arthur Brown – lead vocals (3)
- John Miles – lead vocals (4–5), electric guitar (5)
- Jack Harris – additional vocals (3, 5)
- Terry Sylvester – additional vocals (4), lead vocals (11)
- Jane Powell – backing vocals (11)
- Smokey Parsons – vocals
- Bob Howes & the English Chorale – choir (2–4)
- Westminster City School Boys Choir – choir (11)
- David Paton – acoustic guitar (1, 11), backing vocals (1), bass guitar (3–5, 7, 11)
- Kevin Peek – acoustic guitar (9)
- Laurence Juber – acoustic guitar (9)
- Ian Bairnson – electric guitar (1, 3–5, 7, 11, 2 on 1987 remix), acoustic guitar (1, 11)
- David Pack – electric guitar (2)
- Joe Puerta – bass guitar (1–2)
- Les Hurdle – bass guitar (6)
- Daryl Runswick – double bass (9)
- David Katz – violin, orchestra leader (6, 8, 10), orchestra contractor
- Jack Rothstein – orchestra leader (6, 8, 10)
- David Snell – harp (9)
- Hugo D'Alton – mandolin (9)
- Stuart Tosh – drums (1–5, 7, 9, 11), timpani (3), backwards cymbals (3)
- Burleigh Drummond – drums (2)
- John Leach – cimbalom (9), kantele (9)
- Dennis Clarke – saxophone, clarinet

=== Production staff ===
- Gordon Parry – engineer
- Tony Richards – assistant engineer
- Chris Blair – assistant engineer
- Tom Trefethen – assistant engineer
- Pat Stapley – assistant engineer
- Peter Christopherson – photography
- Aubrey Powell – photography
- Storm Thorgerson – photography
- Sam Emerson – photography
- Hipgnosis – design, cover art
- Colin Elgie – artwork, graphic design, layout design

== Charts ==
=== Weekly charts ===
Chart (1976–1978)	Peak position
Australian Albums (Kent Music Report)	45
Canada Top Albums/CDs (RPM)	81
German Albums (Offizielle Top 100)	11
New Zealand Albums (RMNZ)	7
Spanish Albums (AFE)	17
UK Albums (Official Charts)	56
US Billboard 200	38

Chart (1987)	Peak position
Dutch Albums (Album Top 100)	75
German Albums (Offizielle Top 100)	18

=== Year-end charts ===
Chart (1976)	Position
New Zealand Albums (RMNZ)	38

Chart (1977)	Position
German Albums (Offizielle Top 100)	29

Chart (1978)	Position
German Albums (Offizielle Top 100)	6

Chart (1979)	Position
German Albums (Offizielle Top 100)	12

Chart (1980)	Position
German Albums (Offizielle Top 100)	62

== Certifications ==
Region	Certification	Certified units/sales
Canada (Music Canada)	Platinum	100,000^{^}
Germany (BVMI)	Platinum	500,000^{^}
United Kingdom (BPI)	Silver	60,000^{^}
^{^} Shipments figures based on certification alone.

== See also ==
- Edgar Allan Poe and music
- "A Dream Within a Dream"
- "The Raven"
- "The Tell-Tale Heart"
- "The Cask of Amontillado"
- "The System of Doctor Tarr and Professor Fether"
- "The Fall of the House of Usher"
