= Vieri Tosatti =

Italian composer

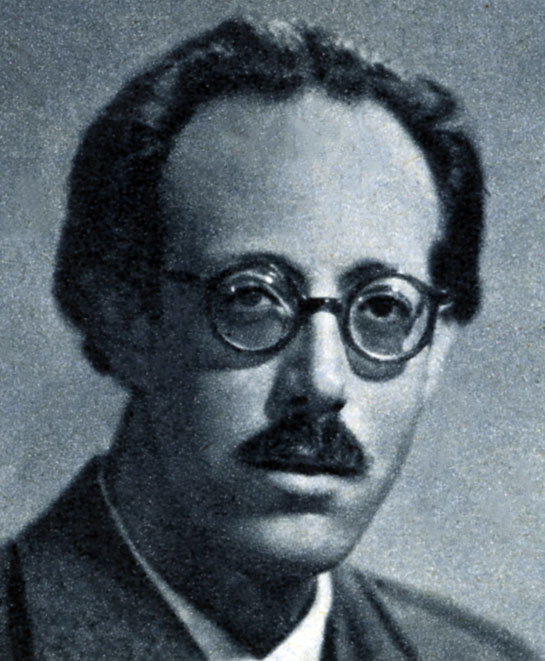
Vieri Tosatti

Vieri Tosatti (born in Rome, 1920 - died there, 1999) was an Italian composer. He is best known for his operas, among them Il sistema della dolcezza (1948), after Edgar Allan Poe's "The System of Doctor Tarr and Professor Fether", and Partita a pugni (1953), about a boxing match. His output also includes chamber music, as well as some symphonic and choral works. He studied at the Accademia Nazionale di Santa Cecilia under Ildebrando Pizzetti.

Tosatti's also known because of his work for avant-garde composer Giacinto Scelsi as a score transcriptionist and orchestra conductor.
