= The System of Doctor Tarr and Professor Fether =

Dark comedy short story by Edgar Allan Poe

- Short story by Edgar Allan Poe
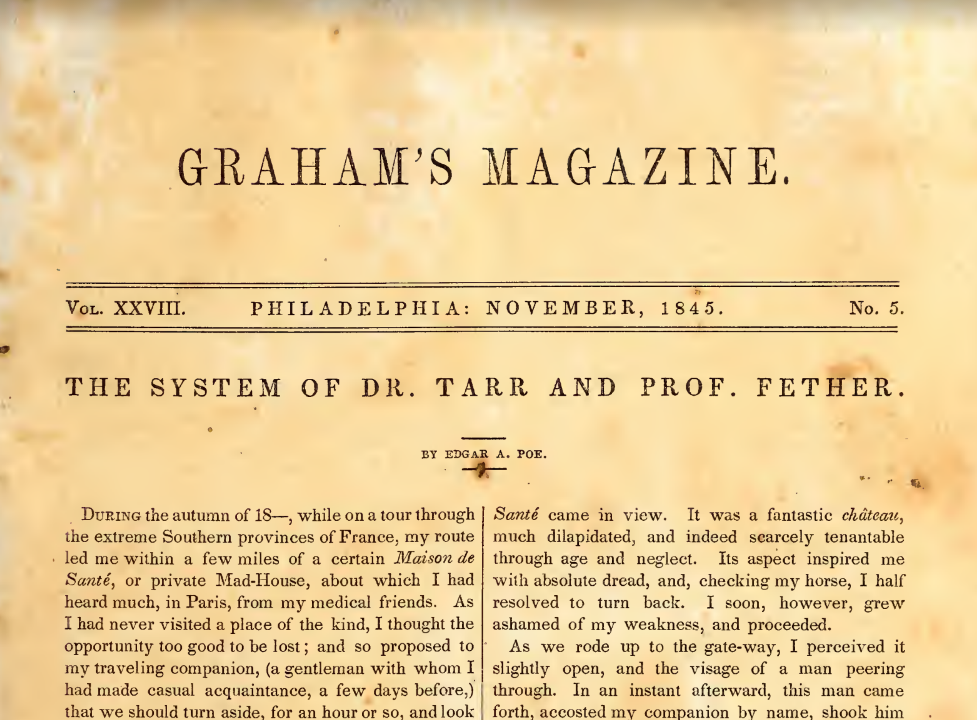
- First page of the story in Graham's Magazine (November 1845)
- Country: United States
- Language: English
- Genres: Comedy; Short story

Publication
- Published in: Graham's Magazine
- Media type: Print (Periodical)
- Publication date: 1845

"The System of Doctor Tarr and Professor Fether" is a dark comedy short story by the American author Edgar Allan Poe. First published in Graham's Magazine in November 1845, the story centers on the naïve, unnamed narrator's visit to a mental asylum in the southern provinces of France.

== Plot summary ==
The story follows an unnamed narrator who visits a mental institution in southern France (more accurately, a maison de santé) known for a revolutionary new method of treating mental illnesses called the "system of soothing". A companion with whom he is travelling knows Monsieur Maillard, the hospital's superintendent, and introduces the narrator to him before riding ahead. The narrator is shocked to learn that the system of soothing has been abandoned and replaced with one partly devised by Maillard.

The narrator tours the grounds of the hospital and is invited to dinner, which is attended by a group of people in overly gaudy, ill-fitting clothing. A large and lavish spread of food is served, but the narrator notices a great many candles placed all over the table and room, as well as a musical ensemble whose performance becomes increasingly loud and cacophonous as the meal progresses. Several of the guests describe unusual behaviors exhibited by the patients and then proceed to act them out; Maillard occasionally tries to calm them down, and the narrator seems very concerned by their behavior and passionate imitations.

Maillard explains that the treatment system now in effect is based on the work of a "Doctor Tarr" and a "Professor Fether", with whom the narrator is unfamiliar. The system of soothing was abandoned after the patients at one hospital, who had been granted significant liberty to move about the grounds, conspired to overpower the staff and lock them in the patients' rooms. Led by a man who claimed to have invented a better method of treating mental illness, the patients helped themselves to the wealth of the family that owned the hospital and allowed no visitors, except for one man who was deemed too stupid to cause any trouble based on what he might see during his visit.

The conversation between Maillard and the narrator is interrupted by a series of yells from outside the dining room. As the narrator asks how order was eventually restored at the hospital, a group of figures covered in tar and feathers bursts in. The narrator realizes that Maillard had in fact been describing events at his own hospital, which he had overseen until he himself went insane and was committed as a patient – a fact of which his travelling companion had been unaware. The staff had been tarred and feathered and locked in the rooms, but one of them escaped through the sewers and freed the rest.

The narrator closes his story by saying that the staff have restored order at the hospital and reinstated the soothing system, with some changes, and that he has been unable to find any works by either Tarr or Fether.

=== The "system of soothing" ===
Under the soothing system, patients are granted a great deal of freedom, wearing everyday clothing and allowed to move freely throughout the house and grounds. The doctors and staff do not contradict any delusions the patients may exhibit, but rather encourage them as fully as possible. For example, a man who believes he is a chicken may be given only corn and gravel to eat for a week, in order to break his pattern of delusional thoughts. Monsieur Maillard notes that the system has some disadvantages, which have led to its abandonment at all maisons de santé in France in favor of a treatment system he has devised. The narrator remarks that after the patient revolt is crushed, the soothing system is reinstated at the asylum he has visited, though modified in certain ways that are intended to reform it.

== Publication history ==
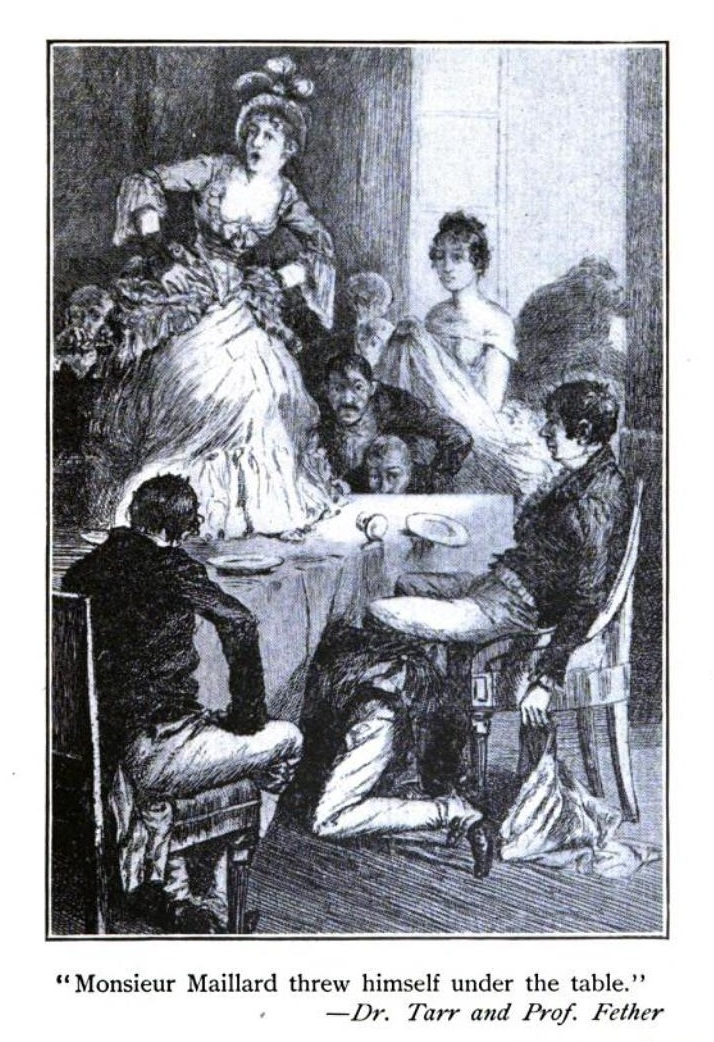
Illustration from 1902

"The System of Doctor Tarr and Professor Fether" was held by editors for several months before being published in Graham's Magazine for November 1845.

== Analysis ==
At the time the story was written, the care of the insane was a significant political issue in the United States. People were calling for asylum reform because the mentally ill were being treated as prisoners, while increased acquittals due to the insanity defense were criticized for allowing criminals to avoid punishment.

The story has been interpreted as a satirical political commentary on American democracy, a parody of the work of Charles Dickens and Nathaniel Parker Willis, and is also understood as a critique on 19th-century medical practices.

== Adaptations ==
- One of the plays given at the Théâtre du Grand Guignol in Paris was Le Système du Dr Goudron et Pr Plume (1903), adapted by André de Lorde.
- The French film Le système du docteur Goudron et du professeur Plume, also known as The System of Doctor Goudron and The Lunatics (1913), directed by Maurice Tourneur.
- The German film Unheimliche Geschichten (1932) is based on two stories by Poe: "The Black Cat" and "The System of Doctor Tarr and Professor Fether".
- An opera called Il sistema della dolcezza (1948), composed by Vieri Tosatti.
- The Spanish film Manicomio (1954) is based on stories by several authors, including Poe's "The System of Doctor Tarr and Professor Fether".
- An episode of The Alfred Hitchcock Hour entitled "A Home Away from Home" (27 September 1963), starring Ray Milland.
- The Polish TV movie System (1972).
- The surreal Mexican film La mansión de la locura (1973), in English The Mansion of Madness (aka Dr. Tarr's Torture Dungeon/House of Madness) by Juan López Moctezuma.
- Director S. F. Brownrigg's movie The Forgotten (1973), also known as Death Ward #13 and Don't Look in the Basement.
- "(The System of) Dr. Tarr and Professor Fether" is the fifth track on Tales of Mystery and Imagination, an album by The Alan Parsons Project of music inspired by the works of Edgar Allan Poe.
- Czech filmmaker Jan Švankmajer based part of his film Lunacy on this story. The film was also inspired by Poe's 1844 short story "The Premature Burial", as well as the works of the Marquis de Sade.
- A one-act opera called A Method for Madness (1999), composed by David S. Bernstein to a libretto by Charles Kondek.
- The animated Spanish film Gritos en el Pasillo (2007; in English, "Going Nuts"), directed by Juanjo Ramírez, is a stop motion movie with peanuts, inspired in part by the story.
- The story has been adapted for short films, including The System of Dr. Tarr and Professor Fether (2008) (changing the location to Philadelphia) and Tohtori Tarrin ja professori Featherin menetelmä (2012).
- A 2014 film adaptation is titled Stonehearst Asylum.

== See also ==
- O alienista, a satiric novella by Machado de Assis about an asylum
