= Dave Townsend =

British songwriter, lyricist, and singer

Dave Townsend is a British songwriter, lyricist, and singer, and was born in Somerset, in South West England. Aside from a solo career, he was also a vocalist for The Alan Parsons Project, singing lead vocals on "Don't Let It Show" on the album, I Robot (1977), and "You Won't Be There" from Eve (1979).

Townsend was the singer for the Taunton band Phoenix Press before going solo. He wrote the song "Miss You Nights" in 1974 while his girlfriend was away on holiday, and recorded it on an album for Island Records, but the label shelved the album and offered the songs to other artists as covers. Cliff Richard recorded it in September 1975, and Townsend (as the composer) was nominated for an Ivor Novello Award in 1977 for "Best Middle of the Road Song," although the winner was John Miles for "Music.", a fellow vocalist with The Alan Parsons Project.

His debut album, Making Up the Numbers, was produced by Robin Geoffrey Cable and released on the Mercury label in September 1978, under the name David Townsend. A single, "When I Kiss You," backed with "High Endeavours," was released on 23 June 1978. The label promoted Townsend to record shops in Music Week as "an imaginative composer, an inventive lyricist and a stylish singer," telling proprietors that they were "going to hear a lot of requests for the album from your customers, so stock up now." As a songwriter, he most notably wrote tracks for:

- Cliff Richard – "Miss You Nights"
- Jimmy Ruffin – "That's When My Loving Begins"
- Elaine Paige – "Far Side of the Bay"

Townsend formed his own music publishing company, Cappy Rat Music. As of 2003, it was reported that Townsend was writing a Ph.D. thesis in history at Essex University. Lyrics for many of his songs are on his official website.
