= Magic (Pilot song) =

1974 single by Pilot

- German single picture sleeve

Single by Pilot

from the album From the Album of the Same Name
- B-side: "Just Let Me Be"
- Released: September 1974 (UK); April 1975 (US)
- Recorded: 1974, Abbey Road Studios, London
- Genre: Soft rock; glam rock; pop rock; power pop
- Length: 3:03
- Label: EMI
- Songwriters: David Paton; Billy Lyall
- Producer: Alan Parsons

Pilot singles chronology
"Just a Smile" (1974)	"Magic" (1974)	"January" (1975)

"Magic" is a 1974 song by Scottish pop rock band Pilot and was the first hit single for the group. It was written by band members David Paton and Billy Lyall for their debut album From the Album of the Same Name.

== Background ==
According to Paton, the song is inspired by the sunrise on Blackford Hill in Edinburgh. In a 2012 interview with Hotdisc Television, Paton also stated that at the time, his wife said she had "never seen a daybreak", which also inspired the song.

== Personnel ==
=== Pilot ===
- David Paton – lead vocals, bass, electric guitar
- Billy Lyall – keyboards, synthesizer, piano, backing vocals
- Stuart Tosh – drums, backing vocals

=== Additional personnel ===
- Ian Bairnson – additional electric guitar (uncredited)

== Chart performance ==
"Magic" charted most successfully in Canada, where it topped the RPM national singles chart on 19 July 1975, and received a gold certification. It climbed as far as number 11 on the UK Singles Chart and reached number 5 during the summer of 1975 in the US on the Billboard Hot 100.

=== Weekly charts ===
Chart (1974–1975)	Peak position
Australia (Kent Music Report)	12
Canadian RPM Top Singles	1
Germany	39
Ireland (IRMA)	6
Netherlands (Dutch Top 40)	8
South Africa (Springbok Radio)	11
UK Singles (Official Charts)	11
US Billboard Hot 100	5
US Cash Box Top 100	5

=== Year-end charts ===
Chart (1975)	Rank
Australia (Kent Music Report)	61
Canada	16
Netherlands (Dutch Top 40)	89
U.S. Billboard Hot 100	32

== Certifications ==
Region	Certification	Certified units/sales
Canada (Music Canada)	Gold	75,000^{^}
United States (RIAA)	Gold	1,000,000^{^}
^{^} Shipments figures based on certification alone.

== Selena Gomez version ==
"Magic"

Promotional single by Selena Gomez

from the album Wizards of Waverly Place
- Released: 21 July 2009
- Recorded: 2009
- Genre: Pop rock
- Length: 2:49
- Label: Walt Disney
- Songwriters: William Lyall; David Paton
- Producers: Ted Bruner; Trey Vittetoe

Music video
- "Magic" on YouTube

The cover version by Selena Gomez was released on 22 July 2009 as part of the Radio Disney iTunes Pass, serving as a promotional single for the soundtrack of the Disney Channel television series Wizards of Waverly Place. It debuted and peaked at no. 61 on the U.S. Billboard Hot 100 chart with 42,000 downloads. It also peaked at No. 80 on the Canadian Hot 100 chart, No. 5 on the Norwegian Singles Chart and at No. 90 on the UK Singles Chart. It has sold 563,000 copies in the United States. The song was featured in the television film Wizards of Waverly Place: The Movie. The music video premiered on the Disney Channel on 24 July 2009, and was directed by Roman Perez.

=== Charts ===
Chart (2009–2010)	Peak position
Canada Hot 100 (Billboard)	80
Guatemala (EFE)	8
Norway (VG-lista)	5
Scottish Singles Sales (Official Charts)	72
UK Singles (Official Charts)	90
US Billboard Hot 100	61

=== Certifications ===
Region	Certification	Certified units/sales
United States (RIAA)	Gold	500,000^{‡}
^{‡} Sales+streaming figures based on certification alone.

== Ozempic television advertisement ==
In 2018, pharmaceutical company Novo began using the song in its ads for Ozempic, an injectable drug originally intended for people with type 2 diabetes, but which became popular for its off-label use as a weight-loss drug. David Paton was asked to return to Abbey Road Studios to record a new version of the song, which from a vocal standpoint is little more than his singing the opening line, replacing the words "It's magic" with "Ozempic" and otherwise adding nonverbal singing.

== See also ==
- List of 1970s one-hit wonders in the United States
