= Minimum Vital =

French progressive rock band

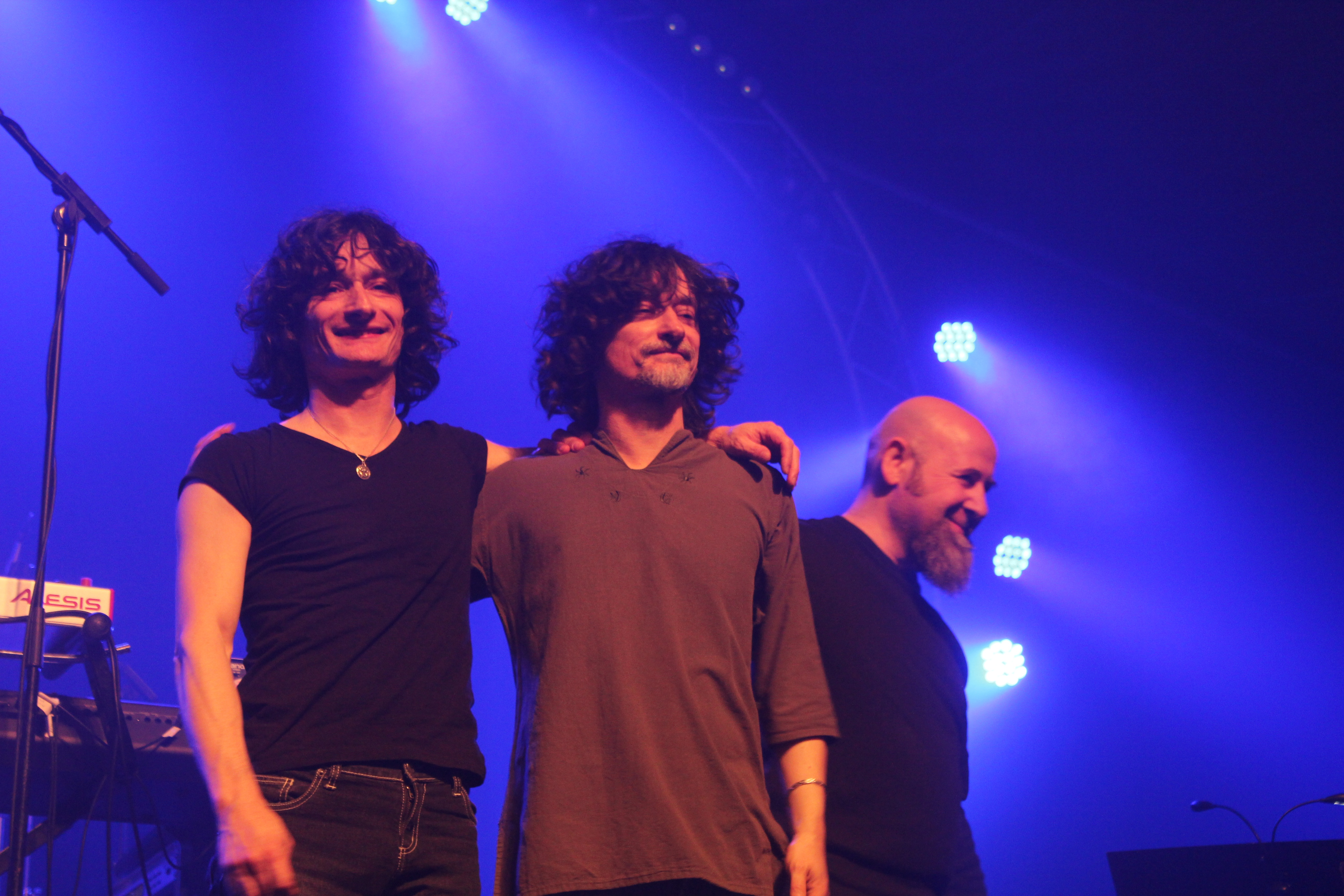
- Minimum Vitalam at Anthinoises on 25. April 2014

Background information
- Origin: Bègles, France
- Genres: Progressive Rock
- Years active: 1982–present
- Labels: Musea Records
- Members: Thierry Payssan; Jean-Luc Payssan; Eric Rebeyrol; Charly Berna
- Past members: François Péron; Antoine Fillon; Anne Colas; Christophe Godet; Jaki Whitren; Sonia Nedelec; Jean Baptiste Ferracci; Didier Ottaviani
- Website: www.minimum-vital.fr

Minimum Vital is a French progressive rock band founded in 1982 by the brothers Thierry and Jean Luc Payssan from Bègles near Bordeaux.

== Style ==
Minimum Vital's musical style is primarily instrumental with influences from jazz rock and folk music, combined with modern elements. The songs contain virtuoso harmonies and rhythms, accompanied by lush vocal textures reminiscent of art rock and Yes. There are also stylistic elements of traditional southern European, medieval and renaissance music, although the band has changed its style over the decades, it has remained true to classic progressive rock styles. Vocal parts are sung partly in French or as a mixture of different languages, some songs contain only words or syllables that fit the music, and a few tracks are sung in English.

== History ==
In 1980, the 16 years old brothers Thierry and Jean Luc Payssan made their first amateur recordings of pop songs from the 1960s under the band name Rocking Chair. They later used the recordings to produce the LP Origi Redux under the band name Survival. Together with Eric Rebeyrol (bass guitar) and François Péron (drums), they founded the group Concept in 1982, but Péron left the band at the first concert in September 1983 and was replaced by Antoine Fillon. In 1984, flautist Anne Colas joined the band, with whom they won a competition in Mimizan, the first prize of which was the recording of a single at the Carat recording studio in Bordeaux. Audio engineer Philippe Ravon suggested the recording an entire LP instead of the single, but the studio was unable to find a record label for the album and wasn't able not finance the LP at its own. Instead, the group released the album Envol Triangles a compact cassette in 1995 at an edition of 500 copies. With this release, the group changed its name to Minimum Vital as a band named Concept already existed. After drummer Antoine Fillon and Anne Colas left the group, Christophe Godet followed as drummer.

In 1988, Minimum Vital released the LP Les Saisons Marines on Musea Records founded by Bernard Gueffier and Francis Grosse. In 1990 the band released their first Compact disc album Sarabandes, which was recorded in Château-l'Évêque. In 1992 the first two Minimum Vital albums Envol Triangles and Les Saisons Marines were re-released on one CD. in the same year the album La Source was released, in which the Payssan brothers contributed more vocal parts than on earlier albums, they were supported by the singer Jaki Whitren. For their fifth album Esprit d'Amor, singer Jean Baptiste Ferracci joined Minimum Vital in 1996. In 1998, Thierry and Jean Luc Payssan started the side project Vital Duo and released the album Ex Tempore in 2001. Also in 2001 the Passians opened their own recording studio Vital Musique.

In 2004 Minimum Vital released their sixth album Atlas. Charly Berna left the band and Didier Ottaviani took over the drums, but practically, the band was already in dissolution at this stage. The Payssan brothers continued to work as Vital Duo. In 2005, Jean Luc Payssan released his solo album Pierrots & Arlequins, and the two brothers and Eric Rebeyrol continued Minimum Vital without a drummer as a trio. in 2009 the album Capitaines was released.

As the band members are no full-time musicians, there have been several longer phases in the band's history with no concerts or releases. Thierry is an architect, Jean Luc Payssan is a librarian and Eric Rebeyrol works as a system administrator at a school. In 2011, Thierry Payssan released his solo album Dans la Maison Vide.

2016, Minimum Vital released the album Pavanes and in 2018 drummer Charly Berna returned to the band. 2019 the album Air Caravan was released.

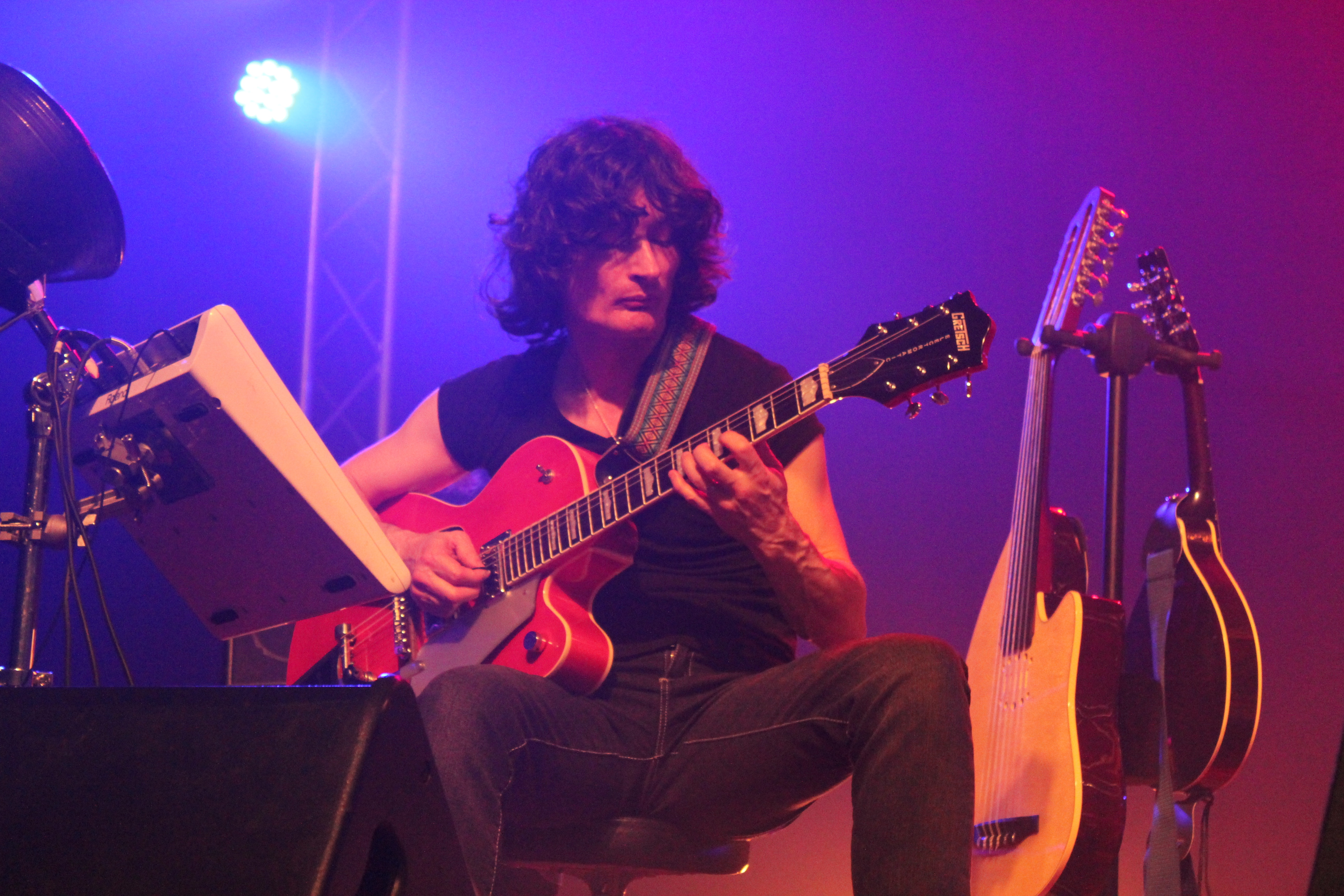
Jean-Luc Payssan (2014)

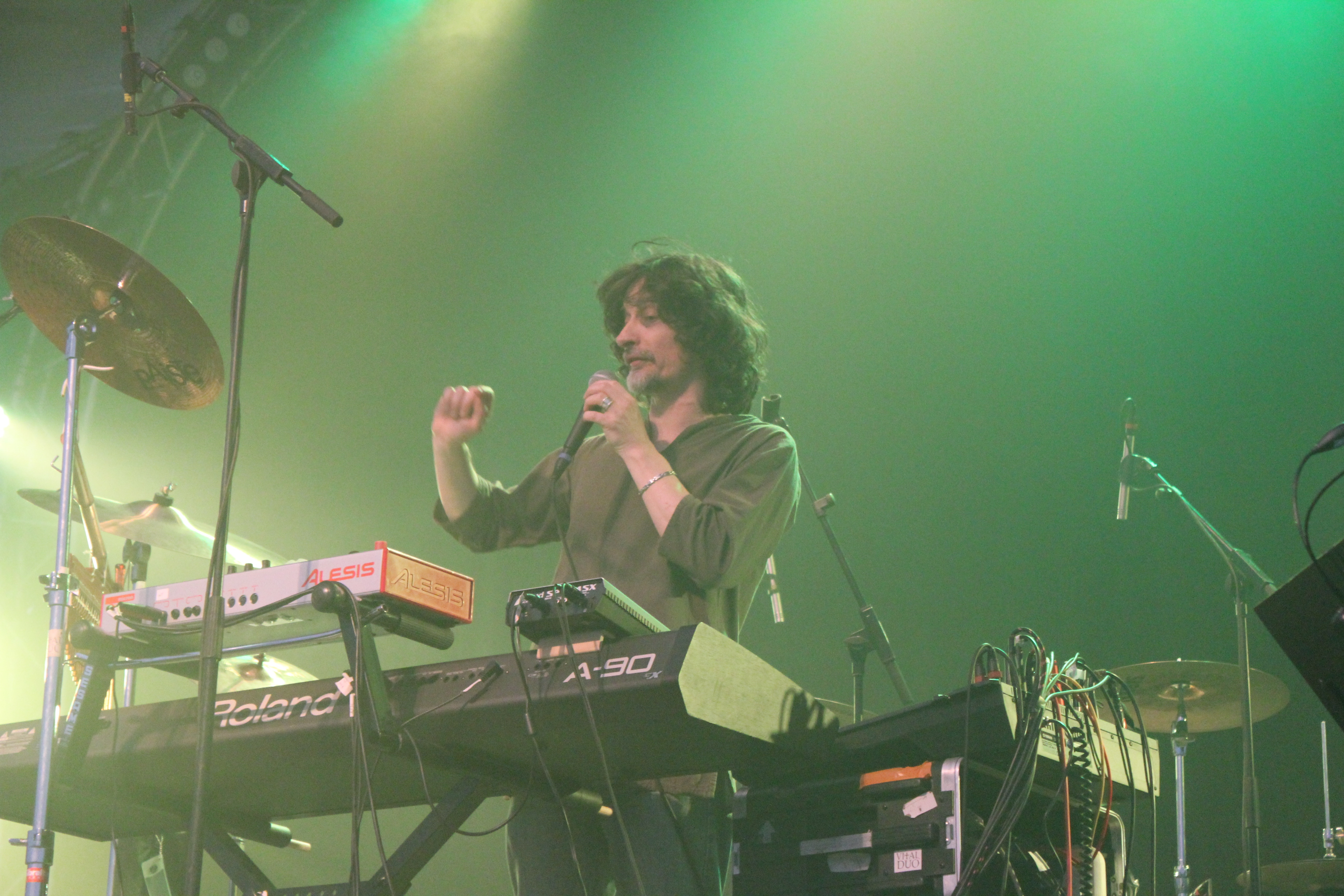
Thierry Payssan (2014)

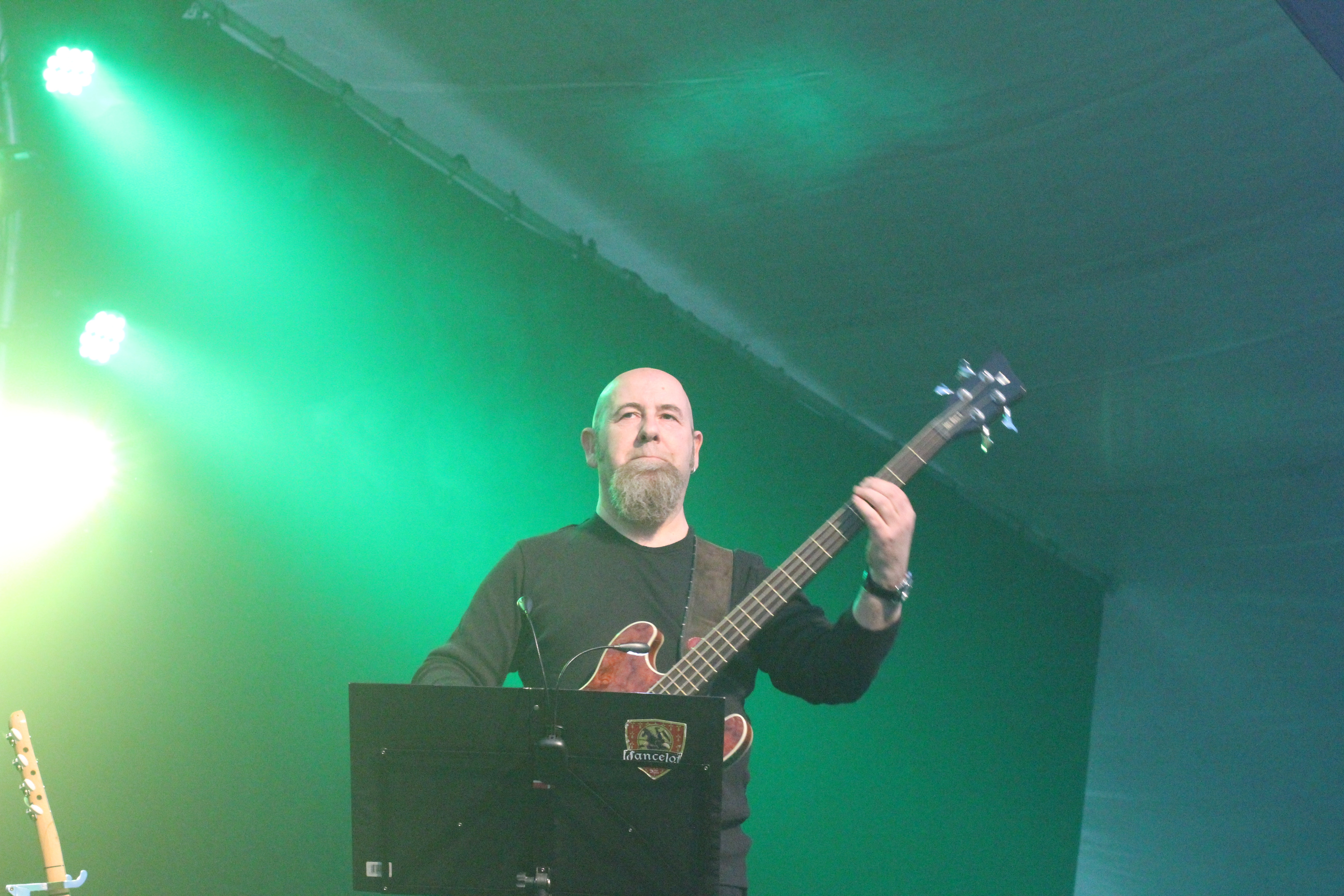
Eric Rebeyrol (2014)

== Discography ==
Studio albums

- 1986: Envol Triangles (Compact Cassette)
- 1988: Les Saisons Marines
- 1990: Sarabandes
- 1992: La Source – Huit Chants de Lumière
- 1997: Esprit d'Amor
- 2004: Atlas
- 2009: Capitaines
- 2016: Pavanes
- 2019: Air caravan

Live albums

- 1998: Au cercle de pierre
- 2021: Minnuendö: Live 2021

Compilations

- 1992: Envol Triangles - Les Saisons Marines (RE-release of the first two albums)

Singles and EP's

- 1993: Danse Des Voeux

Video albums

- 1995: Les Mondes De Worlds Of Minimum Vital (VHS)
- 2012: Chapitre 3
- 2013: Au Cercle De Pierre" & Autres Archives Live
- 2016: Connexions
- 2024: MINIMUM VITAL au festival Crescendo 2023

=== Side projects ===
Vital Duo

- 2001: Ex tempore
- 2002: Le Jardin Hors du Temps (DVD)

Jean-Luc Payssan

- 2005: Pierrots et Arlequins

Thierry Payssan

- 2011: Dans la Maison Vide

== Reception ==
Prog Archives highlights, that Minimum Vital has certainly its own individuality on the desk of progressive rock. For Peter Thelen, Minimum Vital is „one France's most unique bands“.

== Literature ==
- Delage, Frédéric (2014). Prog 100: le rock progressif, des précurseurs aux héritiers (in French). Marseille: Le Mot et le reste. pp. 178–179. ISBN 978-2360541539.
- Fouquet, Denis (2007). Bordeaux rock (1970-2005): 50 ans d'histoire du rock à Bordeaux et sa région (in French). Castor Astral. pp. 105–106. ISBN 978-2859206901.
