= From the Album of the Same Name =

1974 studio album by Pilot

- US cover art

Studio album by Pilot
- Released: October 1974
- Genre: Soft rock
- Length: 44:10
- Label: EMI
- Producer: Alan Parsons

Pilot chronology
From the Album of the Same Name (1974)	Second Flight (1975)

Professional ratings
Review scores
Source	Rating
AllMusic	4/5 stars

From the Album of the Same Name (known as Pilot in the US) is the debut album by Scottish band Pilot, containing the international hit "Magic" and the minor hit, "Just a Smile" (UK No. 31, Australia No. 49, US No. 90). The album was initially released in 1974 by EMI, and later re-released on CD by EMI Japan in 1990 and by C5 Records (Chapter 5 Records), in 1991.

== Background ==
Alan Parsons, who produced From the Album of the Same Name, was introduced to Pilot by two members from the A&R division of EMI. After listening to some tapes from the band, Parsons agreed to produce their first album. Prior to the creation of Pilot's debut album, the band had produced their own work at their studio in Edinburgh, although members from A&R believed that they needed "extra direction". During the album's production, Parsons placed particular attention on the hand claps, as found on the band's first single, "Just a Smile". Parsons fed the hand claps through two Dolby units and processed the signal with an echo effect.

Ian Bairnson plays guitar on this album but, at the time, was not a group member. He officially joined the group after it had been recorded. Richard Hewson handled the orchestral arrangements.

== Track listing ==
All tracks written by David Paton and Billy Lyall.

No.	Title	Length
1.	"Just a Smile"	3:17
2.	"Magic"	3:06
3.	"Lucky for Some"	3:15
4.	"Girl Next Door"	4:03
5.	"Lovely Lady Smile"	3:40
6.	"Sooner or Later"	4:15
7.	"Don't Speak Loudly"	4:44
8.	"Over the Moon"	3:44
9.	"Never Give Up"	3:56
10.	"High Into the Sky"	3:18
11.	"Auntie Iris"	1:49
12.	"Sky Blue"	5:25

=== Bonus tracks (2009 remaster) ===
The album was remastered in 2009 with the following bonus tracks:

No.	Title	Writer(s)	Length
13.	"Pamela" (as Scotch Mist)		3:14
14.	"Magic" (original version)		3:06
15.	"Just Let Me Be" (demo)	Paton, Lyall	3:49
16.	"Cold Stories" (demo)	Paton, Lyall	2:20

== Personnel ==
=== Pilot ===
- David Paton – lead vocals, bass, electric and acoustic guitars, harmony vocals
- Billy Lyall – keyboards, synthesizers, piano, electric piano, electric harpsichord, flute ( "Lucky for Some"), backing vocals, orchestral arrangements ("Girl Next Door")
- Stuart Tosh – drums, percussion, backing vocals

=== Additional personnel ===
- Ian Bairnson – electric guitar ("High Into the Sky" and "Magic" (the latter, uncredited))
- Nick Heath – speech "Yes she does" ("Auntie Iris")
- David Mason – piccolo trumpet ("Girl Next Door")
- Richard Hewson – orchestral arrangements ("Lovely Lady Smile", "Over The Moon", "Sky Blue")
- Tony Gilbert – violin leader
