= Jaki Whitren =

British singer-songwriter

Jaki Whitren (also Jacky Whitren, 1954 – November 24, 2016) was a British singer-songwriter. In 1973 Gramophone called her "Britain's first serious contender to the contemporary rock/ folk throne currently occupied by Carole King and Carly Simon".

== Early life ==
Born in Southampton, her mother was a trained concert pianist and singer who later turned towards jazz. By the age of 13 Jaki Whitren was singing in local clubs around the Southampton area. In 1972 she was approached by the Columbia label and flown to New York to record an album. However, uncomfortable with the more commercial direction in which they were trying to push her, she returned to the UK, and signed up with April Music Ltd and CBS Records International.

== Raw But Tender ==
Her debut album Raw But Tender (1973) was recorded at Nova Sound Studios in the UK for Epic when she was 19 years old, using the folk-blues idiom she was more accustomed to. Along with the vocals Whitren also played guitar and banjo. The album was produced by Mick Glossop and Stuart Cowell, with Albert Lee on Dobro guitar, Marie Goossens on harp, Frank Ricotti (percussion), and Pat Donaldson (bass) and Gerry Conway (drums) from Fotheringay among the session musicians. It featured the autobiographical single "Give Her The Day", about her father's early death and her mother's emigration to New Zealand, which received some airplay on BBC Radio 1 but did not chart. A follow-up single, "Human Failure", also failed to chart. Record Collector called the album "one of the most impressive debuts of the time".

Whitren agreed to a television appearance on The Old Grey Whistle Test, and gigged in support of the album for a year, joining tours with John McLaughlin, Tom Paxton, Loudon Wainwright and others, and one-off shows with Sly and the Family Stone, Genesis and Roy Harper. She also played at the Marquee with Joan Armatrading. But she refused most other offers, seemingly not interested in mainstream commercial success, and stepped back from the business for the next two-and-a-half years.

== Later career ==
Whitren continued to sing and record, but only on her own terms. In 1977 she contributed to the Alan Parsons Project's release I Robot, including the lead vocal on the song "Some Other Time".

In later years, she concentrated on her personal and musical relationship with husband and fellow musician John Cartwright, a Southampton-based pianist and session musician who played with the Jess Roden Band in the 1970s, in a more jazz and soul direction. They became closely associated with the new age music and arts scenes at Glastonbury (Dove Studios, The Phoenix Project) from the late 1970s, with the rural commune at Clos du Pont in Brittany in the 1980s and afterwards, and with the Findhorn Community in Moray, Scotland. In 1992 she performed on the album La Source by the French band Minimum Vital. Court of Miracles was a family band featuring Whitren, Cartright and their two sons, Joby and William.

Whitren's only other solo album was Isis Unveiled, self-released in 2007, showing the continuing influence of Van Morrison. She died of cancer in November 2016, two weeks after the death of John Cartwright from a heart attack. Her son Joby Baker is a musician, songwriter and record producer who now runs a recording studio in Canada.

== Discography ==
- Jaki Whitren – Raw But Tender (Epic, 1973)
- Jaki Whitren & John Cartwright – Rhythm Hymn (Elektra, 1982)
- Jaki Whitren & John Cartwright – International Times (Living, 1983, reissued Emotional Rescue, 2012)
- Court of Miracles (featuring Jaki Whitren & John Cartwright) – Miracle Style (ACT, 1997)
- Jaki Whitren – Isis Unveiled (self released, 2007)

Contributions

- on The Alan Parsons Project - I Robot (1977)
- on Minimum Vital – La Source (1992)
