= Cathee Dahmen =

American model

- Dahmen in 1968
- Born: Cathee Dahmen; September 16, 1945
- Died: November 25, 1997 (aged 52)
- Other names: Catherine Helen Sachs
- Occupation: Model
- Spouses: Leonard Whiting (m. 1971; div. 1977) Alan Merrill (m. 1977; div. 1987)
- Children: 4

Catherine Helen Sachs (née Cathee Dahmen; September 16, 1945 – November 25, 1997), was the first Native American supermodel in the 1960s and 1970s.

She was half German, half Ojibwe and was born and raised in Minnesota.

== Modeling career ==
Dahmen left home at the age of 17 to live with her uncle, artist George Morrison, in Providence, Rhode Island. She was discovered in her late teens by The New York Times illustrator Antonio Lopez, who spotted her uncle's portrait of her and was ultimately responsible for her introduction into the fashion industry.

Dahmen spent her peak years with Ford Models, where she was one of the agency's top earners of the 1960s. She appeared on the covers of numerous fashion magazines including, Harper's Bazaar in 1968 and both UK Vogue and Italia in 1971 She was also associated with the Youthquake movement.

== Family ==
Dahmen grew up in South Minneapolis, Minnesota, and gave birth to her first child, a daughter who she named Veronica Rose, aged 16 in June 1962. The baby was given up for adoption by Dahmen's mother at eleven months of age.

After marrying young British actor Leonard Whiting, Dahmen moved to London where she continued her career, modeling for Models 1. This marriage produced a daughter in 1972, Sarah Beth Whiting, who died in 2014. Dahmen divorced Whiting in the late 1970s and entered her second marriage to singer Alan Merrill (real name Allan Preston Sachs) in 1977, she moved with him to New York from London, in 1980. Dahmen had by then two children with Merrill, daughter Laura Ann Sachs and son Allan Preston Sachs Jr. The couple later divorced and Merrill remarried.

Dahmen retired from modeling in 1980s and died in 1997 from chronic obstructive pulmonary disease. She was survived by her four children.
