= Billy Lyall =

- Born: William C. Lyall; 26 March 1953; Edinburgh, Scotland
- Died: 1 December 1989 (aged 36) West Kensington, London England
- Occupations: Singer; musician
- Instruments: Vocals; keyboards
- Years active: 1969–1989
- Formerly of: Pilot; Bay City Rollers; the Alan Parsons Project

William C. Lyall (26 March 1953 – 1 December 1989) was a Scottish musician, known for his work with Pilot, The Alan Parsons Project, and the Bay City Rollers. Lyall worked as a solo artist and session player into the 1980s before he died from AIDS in 1989.

== Career ==
Lyall was an early member of Bay City Rollers. In 1973, he and David Paton also from Bay City Rollers formed Pilot. They went to number one in their native U.K. with "January" in 1975, soon after having cracked the top ten in the U.S. with "Magic".

He left Pilot in early 1976, and released a solo album, Solo Casting, later that year under the name "William Lyall". A song from the album, "Us", was released as a single. Phil Collins played drums on all but two songs on the album. All members of Pilot contributed to The Alan Parsons Project. All four played on Tales of Mystery and Imagination but Lyall did not play on the next album I Robot as he had left Pilot by the time the album was in works.

He was the keyboard player for Dollar between 1978 and 1982 playing keyboards and synths on the duos first three studio albums. In 1979, he contributed string arrangements and synthesizers to an album by the band Runner.

== Personal life and death ==
Lyall moved to London in the early 1970s and lived in a red-brick mansion flat on Fitzjames Avenue, West Kensington. He died during the AIDS pandemic in 1989, at the age of 36. Bay City Rollers' manager Tam Paton later acknowledged that Lyall was gay.

== Albums discography ==
=== Solo ===
- Solo Casting (1976)

=== With Pilot ===
- From the Album of the Same Name (1974)
- Second Flight (1975)
- Morin Heights (1976)
- Two's a Crowd (1977)

=== With Dollar ===
- Shooting Stars (1979)
- The Paris Collection (1980)
- The Dollar Album (1982)

=== Others ===
- Tales of Mystery and Imagination for The Alan Parsons Project (1976)
- Play It Dirty Play It Class for Jess Roden (1979)
- Sheena Easton for Sheena Easton (1981)
- Take My Time for Sheena Easton (1981)
