= I Robot (album) =

1977 studio album by the Alan Parsons Project

Studio album by the Alan Parsons Project
- Released: 8 July 1977
- Recorded: December 1976 – March 1977
- Studios: Abbey Road, London
- Genres: Progressive rock; art rock
- Length: 41:05
- Label: Arista
- Producer: Alan Parsons

The Alan Parsons Project chronology
Tales of Mystery and Imagination (1976)	I Robot (1977)	Pyramid (1978)

Singles from I Robot
- 1. "I Wouldn't Want to Be Like You" Released: August 1977; 2. "Don't Let It Show" Released: December 1977 (US); 3. "I Robot" Released: January 1978 (UK); 4. "Day After Day" Released: February 1978 (US)

I Robot is the second studio album by British rock duo the Alan Parsons Project, released on 8 July 1977 by Arista Records. The album draws conceptually on author Isaac Asimov's science fiction Robot stories, exploring philosophical themes regarding artificial intelligence.

== Background and concept ==
The album was intended to be based on the I, Robot stories written by Asimov, and Eric Woolfson spoke with Asimov himself, who was enthusiastic about the idea. As the rights already had been granted to a TV/movie company, the album's title was altered slightly by removing the comma in "I," and the theme and lyrics were made to be more generically about robots rather than to be specific to the Asimov universe. The cover inlay reads: "I Robot... The story of the rise of the machine and the decline of man, which paradoxically coincided with his discovery of the wheel... and a warning that his brief dominance of this planet will probably end, because man tried to create robot in his own image." The title of the final track, "Genesis Ch.1 v.32", follows this theme by implying a continuation to the story of Creation, since the first chapter of Genesis only has 31 verses.

According to the band's website, Paul McCartney unintentionally helped to inspire the song "Some Other Time". When Parsons had asked if McCartney could read a line of poetry for the band's first album in exchange for a favor Parsons had previously done him, McCartney replied by saying; "Some other time Alan, some other time". This gave the band an idea for a song title. When Jaki Whitren recorded her vocal track on "Some Other Time", Parsons was pleased with her vocal delivery on the chorus but wanted a different approach for the verses. As such, Peter Straker was brought in to handle the vocals on the verses. Parsons told Prog magazine: "What was interesting was that the voices were actually very similar. Most people haven’t realised the song is sung by two people – one voice on the verses, one voice on the choruses."

By pure coincidence, the album was released shortly after Star Wars came out in the United States. The group acknowledges that part of the album's success came from it being the only album with a robot on the cover during a time when robots were suddenly "all the rage".

== Artwork ==
The artwork was created by the English art design group Hipgnosis. The album cover photo features Storm Thorgerson's assistants in the escalator tubes of the circular Terminal 1 building of the Charles de Gaulle Airport outside of Paris. The picture was taken without the permission of the airport management. Over this is superimposed a painting of a robot with a stylised atom for a brain. The robot also appears on the label of the record. The original vinyl release has a gatefold-style cover; the inside spread has the lyrics and a monochrome photograph of Parsons. The pose and angle of the photograph echoes that of the robot on the front cover.

== Release ==
I Robot was not supported by any live performances and instead received a two-phase promotional campaign to promote the album. For the first phase, Parson and Woolfson visited several cities across the United States where they conducted interviews and playbacks of the album with media personnel. The second phase included create-a-robot contests on radio stations and record stores, displays, and what Record World described as a "fact-finding and sight-seeing tour" in Washington, D.C.. The promotional trip to Washington, D.C included an individual dressed in a mechanical suit outside of the White House along with members of record shops, promotional companies, and a local marketing manager for Arista Records. One of the radio show contests was held by WMMS, which offered a video music machine capable of synchronizing light patterns to music playing from a stereo system as the grand prize.

In the UK, I Robot was promoted via a special event at the Royal Festival Hall where 150 individuals were given the opportunity to listen to the album with headphones, which according to Music Week, broke the world record for "the greatest number of headphones linked simultaneously to one sound source."

Three singles were released from the album: "I Wouldn't Want to Be Like You", "Don't Let It Show" and "Day After Day (The Show Must Go On)". The LP track "Breakdown" received airplay on AOR stations. By 1981, I Robot had sold over one million copies in the United States.

After the album's release, Clive Davis, who signed the duo to Arista Records, arranged for a meeting with Steven Spielberg and John Williams to discuss the possibility to use music from I Robot in the film Close Encounters of the Third Kind. Davis recalled that Spielberg and Williams were "very polite and respectful", but ultimately declined.

== Critical reception ==
Professional ratings
Review scores
Source	Rating
AllMusic	4.5/5 stars
Christgau's Record Guide	C

Billboard believed that the use of the vocoder contributed to a sound resembling the work of Kraftwerk and Tangerine Dream and thought that the album would perform well on FM radio. Record World called the album Parsons' "finest achievement to date".

Music Week said that the album featured a "lush production right through from the cover art to the recorded sound" and thought that its conceptual themes were "grandiose enough to make for impressive listening." The New York Times praised the "really ingenious use of the possibilities of the modern recording studio," but concluded that "the overall esthetic is still a flatulent one, self-importantly preening itself as art."

== Reissues ==
I Robot has been reissued multiple times in various formats since its initial release on vinyl, including numerous audiophile releases. Besides the 8-track, vinyl and compact-cassette releases, Arista also released the original aluminum CD along with the rest of the Project albums, up to that time. Mobile Fidelity Sound Lab (MFSL) released the album on standard vinyl (MFSL 1-084, MFSL2-455), UHQR vinyl (MFQR 1-084), Ultradisk One-Step vinyl (UD1S 1-041), aluminium CD (MFCD-1-804), and on hybrid SACD (UDSACD2174). Classic Records has released the album in analogue form on 180-gram vinyl, as well as digitally on HDAD (24 bit/192 kHz DVD-Audio and 24 bit/96 kHz DVD-Video). JVC released the album as a K2 edition, with Ammonia Avenue and Eye in the Sky. In 2007, as part of a larger campaign, Sony released a remastered version along with bonus tracks on CD. It was later released in Japan as an SHM-CD, with the same mastering.

The album was re-released under Legacy Recordings as a "legacy edition" in 2013 on CD, with an extra disc with unreleased bonus tracks, mastered by Dave Donelly. There was also a vinyl edition with the same mastering launched one month later.

The latest re-release in October 2025 consists of 2 45 RPM heavy vinyl albums, the original album (remastered in 2025) on one CD, 3 CDs of bonus and unreleased tracks, plus a Blu-Ray disc with DTS, DTS-HD, Dolby Digital and Dolby Atmos remixes of the original album, plus the 2025 remaster in high resolution audio.

== Track listings ==
All songs written and composed by Alan Parsons and Eric Woolfson, except where noted.

Side one
No.	Title	Lead vocals	Length
1.	"I Robot"	The English Chorale	6:02
2.	"I Wouldn't Want to Be Like You"	Lenny Zakatek	3:22
3.	"Some Other Time"	Peter Straker & Jaki Whitren	4:06
4.	"Breakdown"	Allan Clarke	3:50
5.	"Don't Let It Show"	Dave Townsend	4:24
Total length:			21:44

Side two
No.	Title	Lead vocals	Length
1.	"The Voice"	Steve Harley	5:24
2.	"Nucleus"	Instrumental	3:31
3.	"Day After Day (The Show Must Go On)"	Jack Harris	3:49
4.	"Total Eclipse" (Andrew Powell)	The English Chorale	3:09
5.	"Genesis Ch. 1 V. 32"	The New Philharmonia Chorus	3:28
Total length:			19:21

2007 reissue bonus tracks

11. "Boules" (I Robot experiment) – 1:59
12. "Breakdown" (early demo of backing riff) – 2:09
13. "I Wouldn't Want to Be Like You" (backing track rough mix) – 3:28
14. "Day After Day" (early stage rough mix) – 3:40
15. "The Naked Robot" – 10:19

2013 Sony Music Entertainment reissue (Legacy Edition) bonus tracks

11. "U.S Radio Commercial for I Robot – 1:01
12. "I Robot (Boules Experiment)" – 1:59
13. "I Robot" (Hilary Western Vocal Rehearsal) – 1:33
14. "Extract 1 from The Alan Parsons Project Audio Guide" – 1:04
15. "Extract 2 from The Alan Parsons Project Audio Guide" – 0:57
16. "I Wouldn't Want to Be Like You" (backing track rough mix) – 3:28
17. "Some Other Time" (Complete vocal by Jaki Whitren) – 3:43
18. "Breakdown" (early demo of backing riff) – 2:09
19. "Extract 3 from The Alan Parsons Project Audio Guide" – 0:31
20. "Breakdown - The Choir" – 1:51
21. "Don't Let It Show" (Eric Woolfson demo) – 3:26
22. "Day After Day" (early stage rough mix) – 3:40
23. "Genesis Ch. 1 V. 32" (Choir session) – 2:18
24. "The Naked Robot" – 10:19

== Personnel ==
- David Paton – bass (tracks 1–8, 10), acoustic guitar (tracks 3, 10), backing vocals (track 8)
- Stuart Tosh – drums (tracks 1–8, 10), percussion (tracks 5–6), water gongs (track 7)
- Ian Bairnson – electric and acoustic guitars (tracks 1–8, 10), backing vocals (track 8)
- Eric Woolfson – clavinet (tracks 1, 3), Fender Rhodes (track 2), Wurlitzer (tracks 2, 4, 6), piano (tracks 3, 5, 8), organ (track 5), keyboards (tracks 7, 10), backing vocals (track 8)
- Alan Parsons – Projectron (tracks 1, 3–4, 6–7), Synthi-A Sequencer Programming (tracks 1, 8), acoustic guitar (track 5), vocoder (track 6), tape loops and effects (track 7), backing vocals (track 8)
- Duncan Mackay – keyboards (tracks 1, 4, 7, 10)
- John Wallace – piccolo trumpet (track 5)
- B.J. Cole – steel guitar (track 8)
- Andrew Powell – Hammond B-3 organ (track 8)
- John Leach – cimbalom and kantele (tracks 1, 3)
- Lenny Zakatek, Allan Clarke, Steve Harley, Jack Harris, Peter Straker, Jaki Whitren, Dave Townsend, the English Chorale, the New Philharmonia Chorus – vocals
- Hilary Western – soprano vocals (track 1)
- Tony Rivers, John Perry and Stu Calver – backing vocals (tracks 3, 10)
- Produced and engineered by Alan Parsons, executive producer Eric Woolfson
- Orchestra and choir arranged and conducted by Andrew Powell

== Charts ==
=== Weekly charts ===
Chart (1977–1980)	Peak position
Australian Albums (Kent Music Report)	10
Austrian Albums (Ö3 Austria)	23
Canada Top Albums/CDs (RPM)	11
Dutch Albums (Album Top 100)	13
Finnish Albums (The Official Finnish Charts)	16
German Albums (Offizielle Top 100)	2
New Zealand Albums (RMNZ)	2
Spanish Albums (AFE)	2
Swedish Albums (Sverigetopplistan)	24
UK Albums (Official Charts)	26
US Billboard 200	9

Chart (2025–2026)	Peak position
German Rock & Metal Albums (Offizielle Top 100)	5
Greek Albums (IFPI)	48

=== Year-end charts ===
Chart (1977)	Position
Canada Top Albums/CDs (RPM)	11
New Zealand Albums (RMNZ)	24

Chart (1978)	Position
German Albums (Offizielle Top 100)	10
New Zealand Albums (RMNZ)	41

Chart (1979)	Position
German Albums (Offizielle Top 100)	23

== Certifications and sales ==
Region	Certification	Certified units/sales
Australia (ARIA)	Gold	20,000^{^}
Canada (Music Canada)	2× Platinum	200,000^{^}
Germany (BVMI)	Gold	400,000
Spain (Promusicae)	Gold	50,000^{^}
United Kingdom (BPI)	Silver	60,000^{^}
United States (RIAA)	Platinum	1,000,000^{^}
^{^} Shipments figures based on certification alone.

== In popular culture ==
- "Don't Let It Show" was covered by Pat Benatar for her In the Heat of the Night LP. Gail Godwin describes it as "much more sentimental than the usual Alan Parsons". A remixed version of the original "Don't Let It Show" was also used as the theme for an unsold pilot of the game show 21 (hosted by Jim Lange and announced by Charlie O'Donnell) in 1982.
- "The Voice" was used as the intro music for the 1981 telenovela Infamia
- "Some Other Time" was also covered by Arjen Anthony Lucassen in his 2012 album Lost in the New Real.
- "I Wouldn't Want to Be Like You" is featured on the Los Santos Rock Radio station in Grand Theft Auto V, and it is used to soundtrack the final action scene during one of the game's possible endings.
