= Leonard Whiting =

British actor (born 1950)

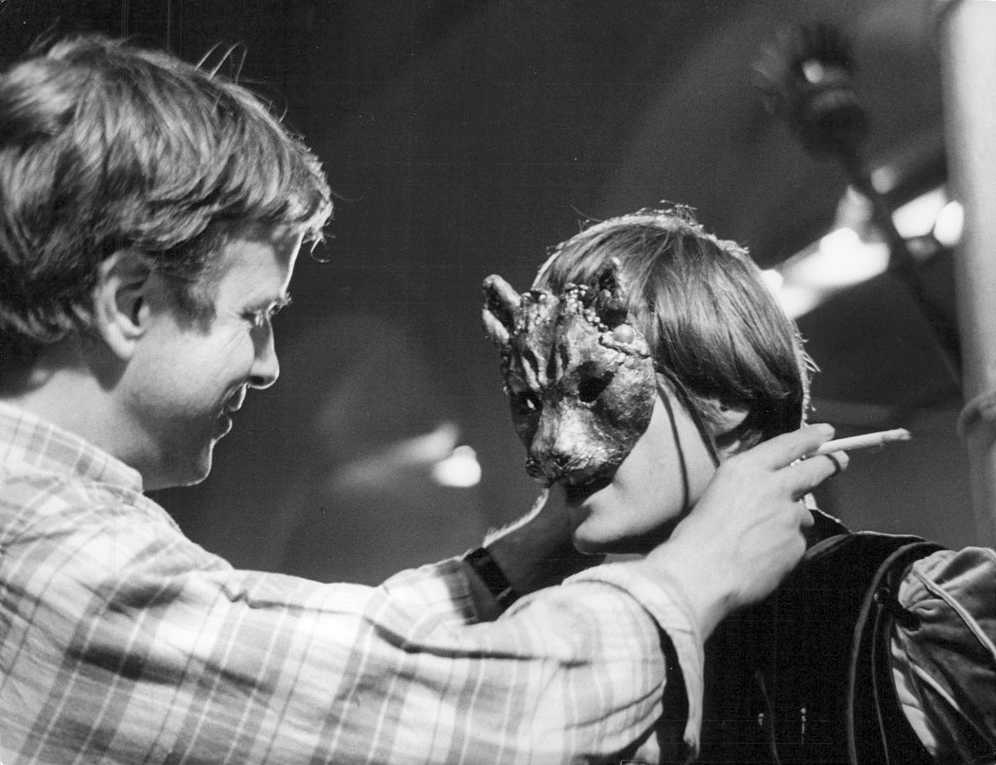
- Franco Zeffirelli assisting Leonard Whiting, who was wearing a mask, during the filming of Romeo and Juliet (1968)
- Born: 30 June 1950 (age 76); Wood Green, Middlesex, England
- Occupation: Actor
- Years active: 1965–1979, 1990–1994, 2015
- Spouses: Cathee Dahmen (m. 1971; div. 1977) Lynn Presser (m. 1995)
- Children: 2

Leonard Whiting (born 30 June 1950) is a British semi-retired actor widely known for his teenage role as Romeo in Franco Zeffirelli's 1968 film version of Romeo and Juliet, a role that earned him the Golden Globe Award for New Star of the Year – Actor in 1969.

== Early life ==
Whiting was born on 30 June 1950, in Wood Green, moving with his two sisters to Holloway, another area of North London, England. The only son of Peggy Joyce (O'Sullivan) and Arthur Leonard Whiting, he has English, Irish and some Romani ancestry. His love of performing was encouraged at his local Church and Primary School, St Josephs R.C Highgate, where he and sister Linda acted in the school's nativity plays. Leonard went on to attend St. Richard of Chichester School, Camden Town, leaving in 1967, before his 17th birthday, to begin work on Romeo and Juliet (1968).

== Career ==
Whiting had some success as a child singer, almost winning Butlin's Talent Contest (he came second) hosted in the holiday camp's packed out Gaiety Theatre. He was later spotted by a theatrical agent at the Connaught Rooms Holborn, where he was performing at a Jewish wedding at the age of 12. He only sang one song ("Summertime") which he had rehearsed as a one-off song with the group Teal Lewis and the Fourtunes, who provided the evening's entertainment. This appearance was set up by his father to get him noticed. After hearing him sing, the agent suggested he try out for Lionel Bart's Oliver! which constantly needed replacements for its child performers. Whiting played the Artful Dodger in the long-running London musical for 15 months, and for 13 months in 1965–1966 appeared at Laurence Olivier's National Theatre in the production of William Congreve's Love for Love opposite Olivier, which toured Moscow and Berlin.

Director Franco Zeffirelli described his discovery, from 300 youngsters who had auditioned over a period of more than three months as: "He has a magnificent face, gentle melancholy, sweet, the kind of idealistic young man Romeo ought to be." Olivier did an uncredited narration in the 1968 production of Romeo and Juliet for Zeffirelli.

He played the male lead, opposite Jean Simmons in the 1971 film, Say Hello to Yesterday, a romantic comedy, filmed on location in and around London, set over one day, with him pursuing a bored housewife, twice his age storyline. In 1973, he played the title role in the made-for-TV film Frankenstein: The True Story alongside an all-star cast that included James Mason, Ralph Richardson, John Gielgud, Jane Seymour, Agnes Moorehead and David McCallum.

In the mid-1970s, his voice caught the attention of Abbey Road and The Dark Side of the Moon engineer Alan Parsons, who was in the process of recording what was to be the first album by the Alan Parsons Project, Tales of Mystery and Imagination. Whiting performed lead vocals on the song "The Raven" and also narrated "To One in Paradise".

Whiting was cast as the Pharaoh in Joseph and the Amazing Technicolor Dreamcoat in London's Westminster Theatre between 27 November 1978 and 17 January 1979. This was a Ken Hill production with the Pharaoh played by Whiting in the style of Elvis Presley.

In 1990, Whiting provided the voice of the Urpney scientist Urpgor in the children's animated television series The Dreamstone. After voicing the character for three seasons, he was replaced by Colin Marsh for the fourth and final season.

In 2014, he reunited professionally with his friend Olivia Hussey for Social Suicide (2015), their first film together in the 46 years since the Franco Zeffirelli production of Romeo and Juliet.

Whiting ended his film career, for the most part, in the mid-1970s and subsequently focused on his theatrical career as an actor and writer. He largely stopped acting in his early 40s after suffering a stroke.

== Personal life ==
Whiting dated Romeo & Juliet co-star Olivia Hussey for a time and the two remained close until her death in 2024. In 1971, he married US model Cathee Dahmen and in 1972, they had a daughter, Sarah Beth Whiting, who died in America in 2014 from cervical cancer.

Following his divorce from Dahmen in 1977, Whiting had a relationship with theatre designer Valerie Marion Tobin, who gave birth to their daughter Charlotte. Charlotte has said publicly that she did not meet her father until she was 12, by which time she had taken her step-father's surname, Westenra (her mother had remarried in 1982). Charlotte Westenra became a theatre director.

In 1995, Whiting married his partner of 23 years Lynn (née Mandell) Presser - a European company director. He and his wife live in Steele's Village in Haverstock, north London.

== Litigation ==
In January 2018, Whiting wrote to Paramount CEO Jim Gianopulos criticising the low fee he had received for Romeo and Juliet and seeking compensation, but Paramount did not respond.

On 30 December 2022, Whiting's lawyer filed joint legal actions with his former co-star Olivia Hussey in Los Angeles against Paramount Pictures for sexual abuse and fraud during the filming of Romeo and Juliet, when he was aged 17 (she was 16), alleging the nude scenes amounted to child abuse. The reported $100+ million claim for punitive damages is made possible due to the temporary suspension of the statute-of-limitations laws in the State of California for claims of historic sexual abuse allegations. Paramount Pictures have reportedly earned up to $500 million from the production, and Whiting, according to business manager Tony Marinozzi, wants Paramount held accountable for the mental and emotional abuse suffered over the intervening years. The third act nude sequence, it is claimed, was "secretly filmed" in September 1967 by director Franco Zeffirelli, over the objections from the two stars, who played Romeo and Juliet in the film, released in 1968. If substantiated, this would show that Whiting was aged 17 years and 2 months during the controversially shot scenes-below the legal required age of 18 (as was co-star Olivia Hussey who would have been aged 16) for filming of nude scenes. The case was dismissed in Los Angeles Superior Court on 25 May 2023.

== Filmography ==
Film
| Year | Film | Role | Other notes |
|---|---|---|---|
| 1968 | Romeo and Juliet | Romeo | Winner: Golden Globe Award for New Star of the Year – Actor, 1969; Winner: David di Donatello Golden Plate Award 1969 (Shared with Olivia Hussey) |
| 1969 | Giacomo Casanova: Childhood and Adolescence | Giacomo Casanova | |
| 1969 | The Royal Hunt of the Sun | Young Martin | |
| 1970 | Say Hello to Yesterday | Boy | |
| 1972 | À la guerre comme à la guerre | Franz Keller | |
| 1975 | Rachel's Man | Jacob | |
| 2015 | Social Suicide | Mr. Coulson | |
Television
| Year | Title | Role | Notes |
| 1965 | A Poor Gentleman | The Page | Television film |
| 1965 | Laughter from the Whitehall | Albert Butch | Episode: "Women Aren't Angels" |
| 1966 | The Wonderful World of Disney | Jimmy the Dip | Episode: "The Legend of Young Dick Turpin" |
| 1973 | Frankenstein: The True Story | Victor Frankenstein | Television film |
| 1973 | Love Story | Nicholas Miller | Episode: "My Brother's House" |
| 1973 | Smike! | Nicholas Nickleby | Television film |
| 1990–1994 | The Dreamstone | Urpgor | Voice |
