= January (song) =

1975 single by Pilot

- Cover of German single

Single by Pilot

from the album Second Flight
- B-side: "Never Give Up" "Do Me Good" (North America)
- Released: January 1975
- Recorded: 1974
- Genre: Pop rock
- Length: 3:31
- Label: EMI
- Songwriter: David Paton
- Producer: Alan Parsons

Pilot singles chronology
"Magic" (1974)	"January" (1975)	"Call Me Round" (1975)

"January" is a song by Scottish rock band Pilot. Written by the band's guitarist and singer David Paton and produced by Alan Parsons, it was released by EMI Records in January 1975 as the follow-up to the band's breakthrough single, "Magic". "January" gave Pilot their only number-one single in the UK, Ireland and Australia.

== Background ==
In a video interview in 2012 for Radio Borders, David Paton explained the song was not about the month, but about a girl named January, the name being taken from a female protagonist in a book his wife was reading at the time. The verse is unrelated to the chorus and talks about the success of "Magic" and how it had opened up the world for him.

== Commercial performance ==
"January" reached number one in the UK in February 1975 for three weeks. In Australia, the song was even more successful, staying at number one for eight weeks, and finishing as the number-two song of 1975. The song also charted in the United States in early 1976, making a minor impression on the Billboard Hot 100.

== Charts ==
=== Weekly charts ===
Chart (1975–1976)	Peak position
Australia (Kent Music Report)	1
Austria (Ö3 Austria Top 40)	16
Belgium (Ultratop 50 Flanders)	23
Belgium (Ultratop 50 Wallonia)	46
Ireland (IRMA)	1
Netherlands (Single Top 100)	26
Norway (VG-lista)	4
UK Singles (Official Charts)	1
US Billboard Hot 100	87
US Cash Box Top 100	87
West Germany (GfK)	15

=== Year-end charts ===
Chart (1975)	Rank
Australia (Kent Music Report)	2
UK (British Market Research Bureau)	18

== Certifications ==
Region	Certification	Certified units/sales
United Kingdom (BPI)	Silver	250,000^{^}
^{^} Shipments figures based on certification alone.

== Legacy ==
During January 2016, the song was used in television advertisements for ASDA supermarkets in the UK.
