= Pilot (Scottish band) =

Scottish rock group

- Promotional image of Pilot, c. 1970s

Background information
- Origin: Edinburgh, Scotland
- Genres: Pop rock; soft rock; glam rock
- Years active: 1973–1977, 2002, 2007–present
- Labels: EMI; Arista
- Members: David Paton
- Past members: Billy Lyall; Stuart Tosh; Ian Bairnson; Steve Swindells
- Website: PilotMagicMusic.com

Pilot are a Scottish rock group, formed in 1973 in Edinburgh by David Paton and Billy Lyall. They achieved considerable mainstream success during 1974–1975, primarily with the release of "Magic" which reached number one in Canada, five on the U.S. Billboard Hot 100, six in Ireland and eleven in the United Kingdom. Follow-up single "January" released in 1975 reached number one in Australia, Ireland and the United Kingdom, as well as reaching eighty-seven in the United States. In the United Kingdom, "January" was awarded a Silver certification from the BPI.

Their debut studio album, From the Album of the Same Name was released in 1974, and reached number eighty-two on the United States Billboard 200 Albums Charts.

== Career ==
=== Formation (1972–1974) ===
Paton and Lyall had briefly been substitute members of the Bay City Rollers before that band's breakthrough. Joined by drummer Stuart Tosh, the band recorded several demos during 1972 and 1974 at Craighall Studios, Edinburgh, where Billy Lyall was the resident engineer. They were signed to a management contract with Nick Heath and Tim Heath, sons of British bandleader Ted Heath, and John Cavanagh. In due course they signed to a worldwide recording deal with EMI Records. After the recording of their debut album, From the Album of the Same Name, guitarist Ian Bairnson (who had played on the album as a session musician) joined the band permanently.

=== Breakthrough (1974–1978) ===
The 1974 single "Magic" from their first album, produced by Alan Parsons and written by Lyall and Paton, was a No. 11 UK and No. 5 US success. It sold over one million copies, and was awarded a gold disc by the R.I.A.A. in August 1975. The song "January" gave them their greatest success in the UK, securing the number one spot in the UK Singles Chart on 1 February 1975. It stayed at number one for three weeks. It also went to number one in Australia where it stayed up top for eight weeks; in the United States, it reached the lower end of the Hot 100. However, the group failed to make the top 30 again. The arranger of "January", Andrew Powell, went on to record Kate Bush, and both Paton and Bairnson played on her debut album, The Kick Inside, which included "Wuthering Heights". Paton and Bairnson also played on Kate Bush's second album Lionheart (1978).

The band's other singles chart successes were "Call Me Round" and "Just a Smile" (both 1975), which each hit the top 40 in the UK and nowhere else. By 1977, only Paton and Bairnson were left from the original foursome, and after switching labels to Arista they recorded Pilot's final album Two's a Crowd with keyboardist Steve Swindells (later of Hawklords).

=== Decline (1976–1978) ===
Lyall left Pilot and in 1976, as William Lyall, released a solo LP, Solo Casting, which included contributions from Paton and Bairnson, with Phil Collins drumming on all but two tracks. Lyall wrote all the songs, played keyboards and flute, and wrote all but two of the orchestral arrangements. Lyall died of AIDS-related causes in 1989. By 1978, all of Pilot's members had begun other projects, with Tosh, Paton and Bairnson becoming members of the Alan Parsons Project, while Tosh also worked with 10cc.

=== Recent works (1978–present) ===
Paton and Bairnson reconvened in 2002 to re-record the original Pilot album Two's a Crowd, which was no longer available. The subsequent issue was entitled Blue Yonder. Arista BMG subsequently re-released the original on CD for the first time. As they approached the 40th anniversary of Pilot's debut album, Paton, Bairnson, and Tosh reunited as Pilot. They released A Pilot Project in August 2014 as an homage to The Alan Parsons Project mastermind Eric Woolfson. In 2019, David Paton released a follow-up to A Pilot Project, The Traveller - Another Pilot Project. With a few exceptions, he recorded all the instruments himself.

In 2020, the label Cherry Red (Rough Trade) released a 4-CD box set containing all 4 albums of the band plus some rare recordings as bonus tracks. In July 2021, Pilot (Paton and Bairnson) released The Magic EP, which features 4 completely re-recorded older songs: "Magic", "January", "Just a Smile" and "Over the Moon". "Over the Moon" was completely rearranged for this purpose. A compilation of Pilot's greatest hits The Magic Collection was released on 21 March 2022.

Ian Bairnson died on 7 April 2023, aged 69. He had been diagnosed with dementia.

== Band members ==
Current members

- David Paton – lead vocals, bass, guitar (1973–1977, 2002, 2007–present)

Past members

- Billy Lyall – keyboards, flute, vocals (1973–1976; died 1989)
- Stuart Tosh – drums, percussion, vocals (1973–1977, 2007–2015)
- Ian Bairnson – guitar (1974–1977, 2002, 2007–2016; died 2023)
- Steve Swindells – keyboards (1976–1977)

Touring members

- Calais Brown – guitar, vocals (2007–2017)
- Kenny Hutchison – keyboards, vocals (2007–2017)
- Simon Marlin – guitar (2016–present)
- Irvin Duguid – keyboards, vocals (2017–present)
- Dave Stewart – drums, percussion, vocals (2016–present)

== Discography ==
=== Studio albums ===
Year	Album	Chart positions	
Year	Album	US	UK
1974	From the Album of the Same Name	82	—
1975	Second Flight	—	48
1976	Morin Heights	—	—
1977	Two's a Crowd	—	—
2002	Blue Yonder	—	—
2014	A Pilot Project	—	—
2019	The Traveller - Another Pilot Project	—	—
2021	The Magic EP	—	—
"—" denotes releases that did not chart.

=== Compilation albums ===
- Best of Pilot (1980)
- A's B's & Rarities (2005)
- The Craighall Demos 71:76 (2007)
- Anthology (2007)
- The Magic Collection (2022)
- The Singles Collection (2025)

=== Singles ===
Year	Title	Peak chart positions									Certifications
Year	Title	AUS	CAN RPM 100	GE	IRE	NLD	SA	UK	US Hot 100	US Cash Box	Certifications
1974	"Ra-Ta-Ta" (as Scotch Mist)	—	—	—	—	—	—	—	—	—	
1974	"Just a Smile"	49	—	—	—	—	—	—	—	—	
1974	"Magic"	12	1	39	6	8	11	11	5	5	RIAA: Gold; CAN: Gold
1975	"January"	1	—	21	1	28	—	1	87	87	BPI: Silver
1975	"Call Me Round"	—	—	—	—	—	—	34	—	—	
1975	"Just a Smile" (new version)	—	—	—	—	—	—	31	90	75	
1975	"Lady Luck"	—	—	—	—	—	—	—	—	—	
1976	"Running Water"	—	—	—	—	—	—	—	—	—	
1976	"Canada"	—	—	—	—	—	—	—	—	—	
1976	"Penny in My Pocket"	—	—	—	—	—	—	—	—	—	
1977	"Get Up and Go"	—	—	—	—	—	—	—	—	—	
1977	"Monday Tuesday"	—	—	—	—	—	—	—	—	—	
"—" denotes releases that did not chart or were not released in that territory.

=== Soundtracks ===
- Happy Gilmore (included in the soundtrack) (1996)
- Herbie: Fully Loaded (included in the soundtrack) (2005)
- The Magic Roundabout (included in the soundtrack) (2005)
- Eve and the Firehorse ("Magic" included in the soundtrack) (2005)
- Doogal (included in the soundtrack) (2006)
- Ozempic ("Magic" melody used as a jingle in pharmaceutical TV commercial) (2018)

== See also ==
- List of 1970s one-hit wonders in the United States
