= Stuart Tosh =

Scottish musical artist (born 1948)

- Born: Stuart Mcbeath Tosh; 26 September 1948 (age 78)
- Origin: Aberdeen, Scotland
- Genres: Rock; progressive rock

Stuart Mcbeath Tosh (born 26 September 1948) is a Scottish drummer, songwriter and vocalist. He recorded and toured with a succession of bands during the 1970s and 1980s, including Pilot, The Alan Parsons Project, 10cc, Camel, and Roger Daltrey.

== Biography ==
Tosh was born in Aberdeen, Scotland. He was a founding member of the 1970s band Pilot, who achieved commercial success in 1974 and 1975 with "Magic" and "January" respectively. The band split up in 1977, and Tosh rejoined again, from 2007 to 2015.

From 1975 to 1977, all four members of Pilot played in The Alan Parsons Project. They played on the first two albums, Tales of Mystery and Imagination and I Robot, made in 1976 and 1977. Tosh left the project and joined 10cc in 1977. Tosh's first album in 10cc was Bloody Tourists, which included "Reds in My Bed" which Tosh sang lead vocals on and "Dreadlock Holiday" which became the bands third and final number one. Tosh was in 10cc for four years, leaving in 1981. Tosh would return for two albums a decade later.

== Albums discography ==
=== With Pilot ===
- From the Album of the Same Name (1974)
- Second Flight (1975)
- Morin Heights (1976)
- Two's a Crowd (1977)
- A Pilot Project (2014)

=== With The Alan Parsons Project ===
- Tales of Mystery and Imagination (1976)
- I Robot (1977)

=== With 10cc ===
- Bloody Tourists (1978)
- Look Hear? (1980)
- Windows in the Jungle (1983)
- Alive (1993)

=== Others ===
- One of the Boys for Roger Daltrey (1977)
- Animalympics for Graham Gouldman (1980)
- More Than a Dream for John Townley (1981)
