= David Paton =

Scottish bassist, guitarist and singer (born 1949)

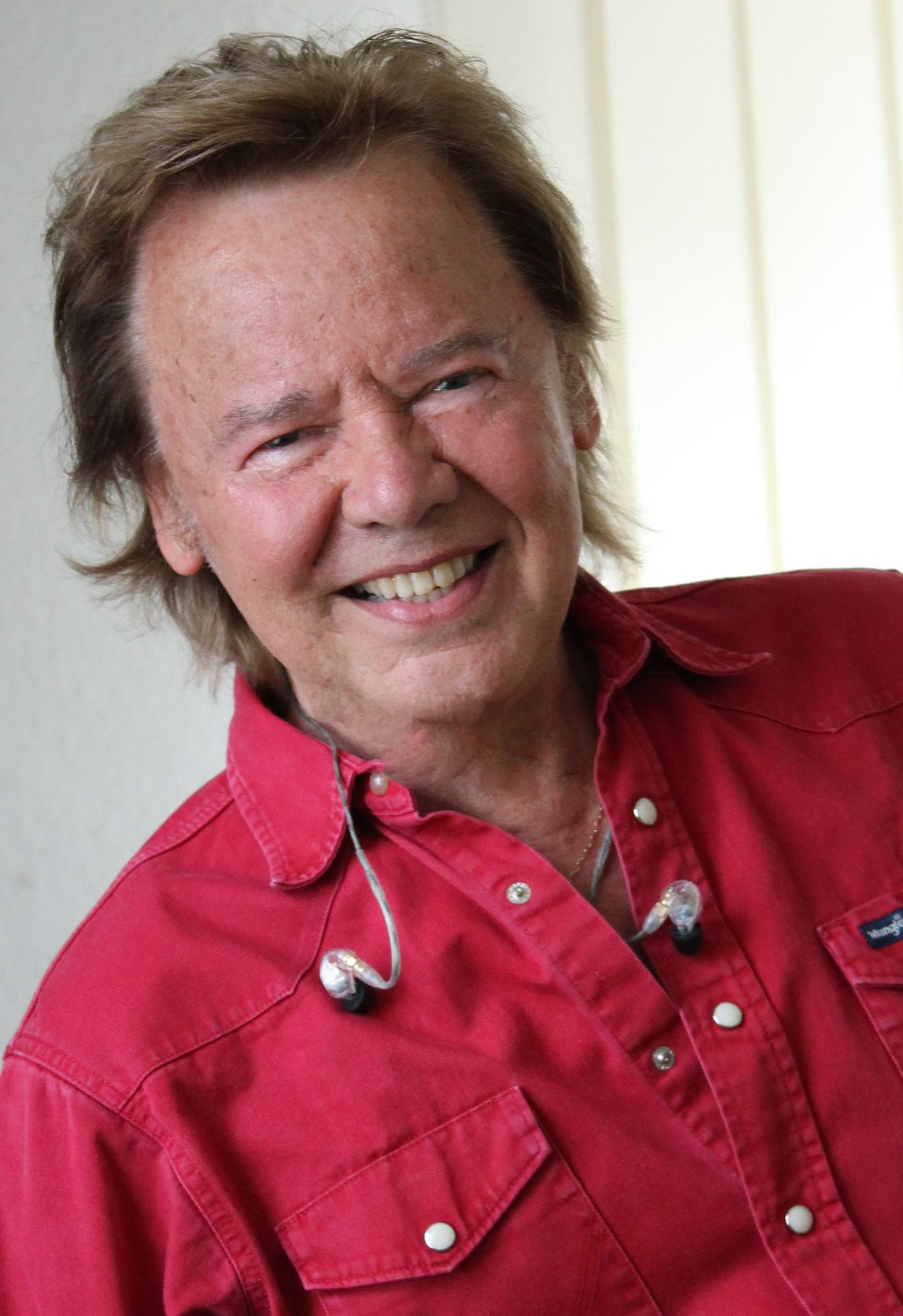
- Paton in 2017 in Magdeburg, Germany

Background information
- Born: 29 October 1949 (age 77); Edinburgh, Scotland
- Genres: Pop, rock
- Occupation: Musician
- Instruments: Bass, guitar, vocals
- Years active: Late 1960s–present
- Formerly of: Bay City Rollers, Pilot, The Alan Parsons Project, Camel, Elton John Band
- Website: davidpatonsongs.com

David Paton (/ˈpeɪtən/; born 29 October 1949) is a Scottish bassist, guitarist and singer. He first achieved success in the mid-1970s as lead vocalist and bassist of Pilot, who scored hits with "Magic", "January", "Just a Smile" and "Call Me Round" before splitting in 1977. Paton is also known for his work in the original lineup of The Alan Parsons Project (1975-1985), and for working with acts such as Kate Bush, Camel and Elton John.

== Early life ==
Born in Edinburgh, Scotland, Paton grew up in the south-eastern suburb of Gilmerton, Edinburgh, where he attended Liberton High School. At the age of 11 he got his first guitar, which he learned to play as an autodidact. His first band was called 'The Beachcombers' and they signed a recording contract in 1968 with CBS Records. They changed their name to The Boots and published their first single, "The Animal In Me". This was soon followed by "Keep Your Lovelight Burning". Because of financial problems, the band split up in 1970.

== Career ==
Paton initially joined the Bay City Rollers for a short period of time but never recorded with them. He joined in 1968, as their bassist, when bassist Alan Longmuir switched to full-time guitarist. After Paton left the Rollers in October 1970, Longmuir switched back to bass, and Paton became a member of another band called 'Fresh'. Fresh changed their name to Christyan and released a single, "Nursery Lane", in 1971. While still playing with the band, he took a job as a musician in a nightclub called Tiffanys where he met Ian Bairnson.

=== Pilot ===
In 1973, Paton was a co-founder of Pilot. With Ian Bairnson, Billy Lyall and Stuart Tosh, they recorded several demos with EMI Records and recorded their first album From the Album of the Same Name which was published in 1974. On it was included their first major hit, "Magic" and Bairnson, who was still not an official member of the band, joined them after the recording of the first album (Paton had played most of the lead guitar on the first album).

They released their second album Second Flight in 1975, and its single "January" topped the UK Singles Chart for three weeks, ironically beginning week ending 1 February. and it was followed in 1976 by their third, Morin Heights which was recorded at Le Studio in Morin Heights in Quebec, Canada, and produced by Roy Thomas Baker.

In 2014, Paton, Bairnson and also Stuart Tosh re-released as the full band Pilot an album called A Pilot Project, which contains exclusively tracks from the Alan Parsons Project. That same year, on 6 September 2014, David Paton, Ian Bairnson and Stuart Tosh played Midfest in Edinburgh for the first time in 39 years with the original line-up (minus the late Billy Lyall).

In 2016 and 2017, Paton, along with Ian Bairnson, was back live as Band Pilot, primarily in Japan, the UK and Germany. They were supported by Kenny Hutchison (keyboards, vocals), Calais Brown (guitar, vocals), Dave Stewart (drums, vocals) and Irvin Duguid (keyboards, vocals).

In 2019, David Paton sort of single-handedly released a follow-up to A Pilot Project, The Traveller - Another Pilot Project. With a few exceptions, he recorded all the instruments himself.

In July 2021, Pilot (Paton and Bairnson) released The Magic EP, featuring 4 completely re-recorded older songs: Magic, January, Just A Smile and Over The Moon. The latter was completely rearranged for this purpose. On 21 March 2022, the long-announced follow-up album The Magic Collection was released, on which the EP tracks are also included.

=== The Alan Parsons Project ===
The same year, he and Bairnson started working with producer Alan Parsons and published a first album under the name Alan Parsons Project, Tales of Mystery & Imagination. Paton played bass and sang with the band until the 1986 album Stereotomy as he continued to work with other artists as a touring- and session musician. He briefly returned to sing lead and backing vocals and play acoustic guitar at the Project's only live appearance in 1990 for the Night of the Proms, while Laurence Cottle played bass guitar as he'd done on the Project's Gaudi and Freudiana. Paton wasn't asked to participate in any further Parsons albums or tours.

=== Solo ===
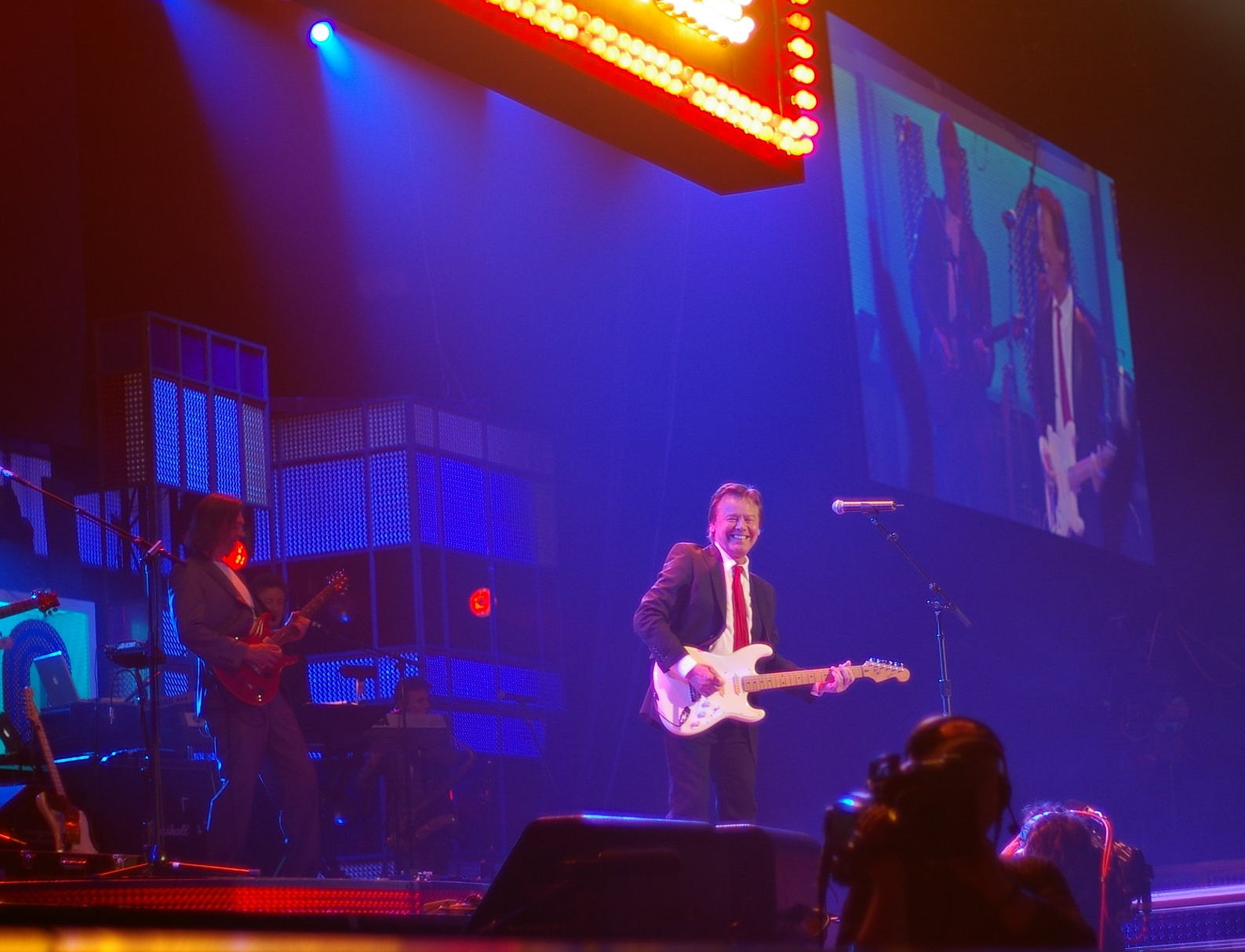
David Paton, Countdown Spectacular 2, Australia, 2007

His first solo album was released in 1991, titled Passions Cry (under the name of Davie Paton), and the second album Fragments in 1996, that was also under the same name. In 1980, Paton already recorded an album with the title No Ties No Strings at the Abbey Road Studios, which was never released. In 2003, however, the album The Search was released, which was a new recording of the "lost album" from 1980. In the following years, David Paton released other solo albums.

=== Later works ===
He also played on the first two albums by Kate Bush in 1978, The Kick Inside and Lionheart.

In the 1980s, Paton was known for his work with Camel and Elton John in studio albums and touring around the world. Other credits include bass guitar and backing vocals for several albums by Fish, as well as Rick Wakeman in the 1990s, such as The Classical Connection, African Bach, Softsword, The Classical Connection 2 and Prayers. In 1984, he was a member of Keats.

In 1985, he participated to the original score for the movie Ladyhawke which was written, composed and played by Andrew Powell and produced by Alan Parsons. From 1985 until 1995 Paton worked as both as studio and live bandmember for Elton John, with a notabele performance on Live Aid.

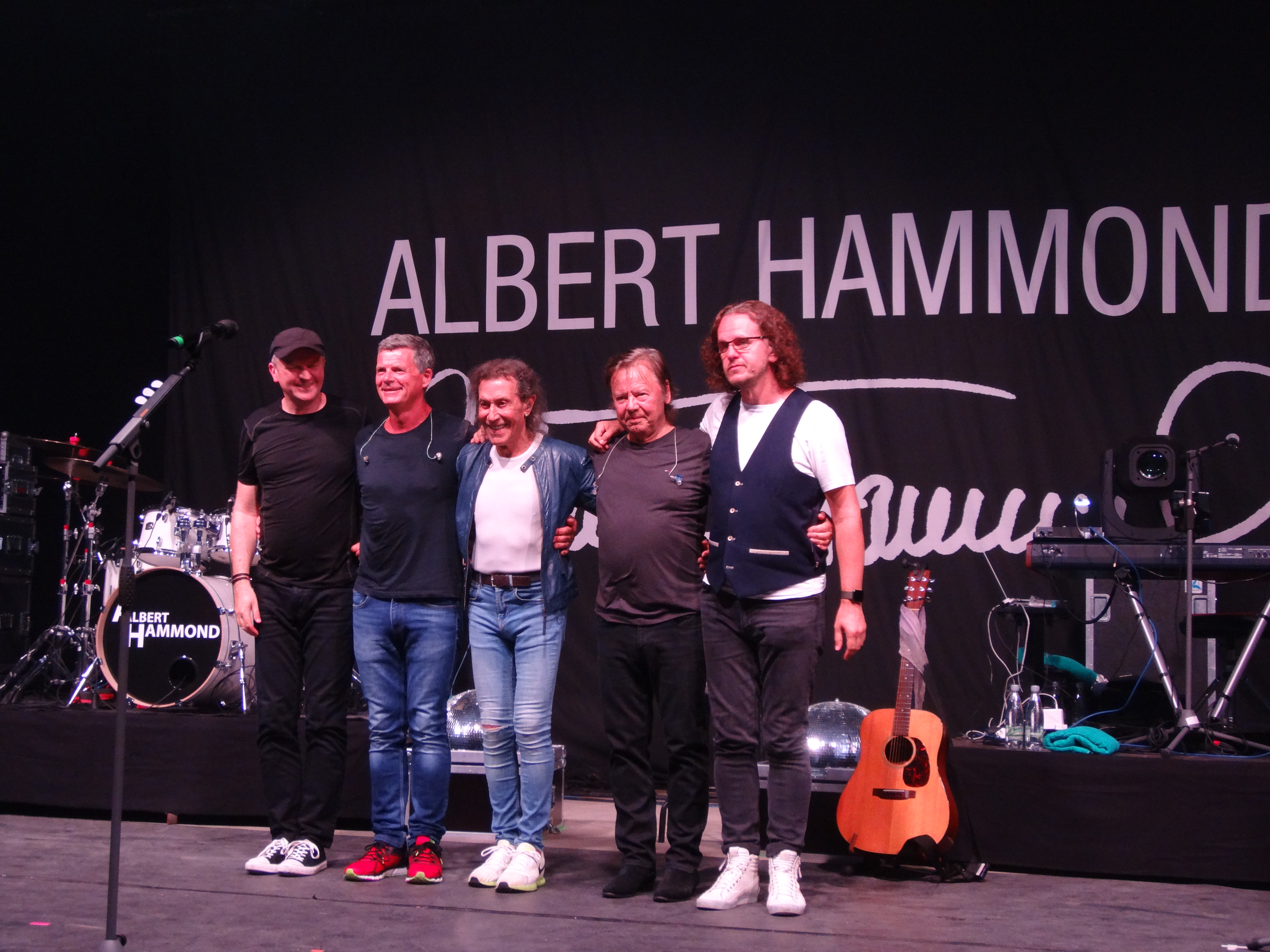
Albert Hammond & David Paton 2018, Live in Schneeberg, Germany

Paton also appeared solo in the Countdown Spectacular 2 concert series in Australia, between August and September 2007, as a performer and musical director. In 2020, Paton's next solo album 2020 was released.

His autobiography Magic: The David Paton Story was released on 30 June 2023.

== Solo discography ==
=== Singles ===
- "Last Night" (2012)
- "Here Without You" (2013)
- "No Words (Covid Thoughts)" (2021)
- "Communication" (2021)

=== Albums ===
- Passions Cry (1991)
- Fragments (1996)
- The Search (2003)
- Fellow Man (2007)
- The Studio Diary Songs (2009)
- Under the Sun (2012)
- 2020 (2020)
- Communication (2024)

== Albums discography ==
=== With Pilot ===
- From the Album of the Same Name (1974)
- Second Flight (1975)
- Morin Heights (1976)
- Two's a Crowd (1977)
- Blue Yonder (2002)
- A Pilot Project (2014)
- The Traveller - Another Pilot Project (2019)
- The Magic EP (2021)
- The Magic Collection (2022)

=== With The Alan Parsons Project ===
- Tales of Mystery and Imagination (1976)
- I Robot (1977)
- Pyramid (1978)
- Eve (1979)
- The Turn of a Friendly Card (1980)
- Eye in the Sky (1982)
- Ammonia Avenue (1984)
- Vulture Culture (1985)
- Stereotomy (1985)

=== With Kate Bush ===
- The Kick Inside (1978)
- Lionheart (1978)

=== With Camel ===
- The Single Factor (1982)
- Stationary Traveller (1984)
- Dust and Dreams (1991)
- On the Road 1982 (1994)
- Harbour of Tears (1996)

=== With Keats ===
- Keats (1984)

=== With Elton John ===
- Ice on Fire (1985)
- Leather Jackets (1986)
- Live in Australia with the Melbourne Symphony Orchestra (1987)
- Reg Strikes Back (1988)

=== With Rick Wakeman ===
- Time Machine (1988)
- The Classical Connection (1991)
- African Bach (1991)
- Softsword (1991)
- The Classical Connection 2 (1993)
- Prayers (1993)
- Rock & Pop Legends: Rick Wakeman (1995)
- Almost Live In Europe (1995)
- The New Gospels (1996)
- Can You Hear Me? (1996)
- Orisons (1996)

=== With Fish ===
- Internal Exile (1991)
- Songs from the Mirror (1993)
- Suits (1994)

=== Others ===
As a session musician, Paton has played on many albums for various artists including The Loreburn Sisters, David Courtney, Don Black & Geoff Stephens, Chris De Burgh, Chris Rea, Elaine Paige, John Townley, Jimmy Page, Andrew Powell, Keats, Matia Bazar, Frank Ryan, Aleksander Mezek, Caterina Caselli, Propaganda, Ron, Richard Thompson, The River Detectives, Fiona Kennedy, Blair Douglas, Gerry O'Beirne, Connie Dover, Andy M. Stewart, John McNairn, Dick Gaughan, Tannas, MacAlias, Donnie Munro, Kenny Herbert, Holly Thomas, Gordon "Nobby" Clark, Ray Wilson, Beagle Hat, Rob Howat, Rococo, The Apple Beggars, and Sheep.
