= Perfect Imperfection (Sean Forbes album) =

Studio album by Sean Forbes
- Released: September 4, 2012
- Recorded: 2010–12
- Genre: Hip hop
- Length: 41:45
- Label: D-PAN, Web
- Producer: Sean Forbes; Bass Brothers

Sean Forbes chronology
Perfect Imperfection (2012)	Little Victories (2020)

Perfect Imperfection is the debut studio album by American deaf hip-hop artist Sean Forbes. It was released on his organization, D-PAN (Deaf Professional Arts Network) and Web Entertainment. Considered one of the most notable albums created by the Deaf community, Forbes is one of the first rappers under the Deaf culture. The CD release of the album comes with a DVD of the music videos based on the tracks, allowing accessibility to both the Deaf community and hearing people. The music videos were also released on YouTube.

== Background ==
In 2010, Forbes signed a record deal with Jeff and Mark Bass from WEB Entertainment, and earned national attention for his debut song "I'm Deaf", which was released on May 11, 2010. Two days later, they conducted a FOX News interview, with Jeff Bass being passionate about Forbes' success.

"Sean doesn't quit. He is so hungry, and he's from Detroit, and we like to keep our talent in Detroit. Honestly I'd like to see him break the mainstream. It would break all barriers."

== Promotion ==
Throughout 2011 and 2012, Forbes issued many music videos on YouTube, with "Let's Mambo" on May 31, "Hammer" on October 25, "Def Deaf Girls" on June 25, and "Bob Dylan (Was the First Rapper)" on September 1, to promote Perfect Imperfection. During the post-release period, the music videos for "Mood Swings" and "Watch These Hands" were released on April 4 and July 30, 2013, as well as "Crazy About You" on January 26, 2015.

After the release of Perfect Imperfection, Forbes and his band travelled to 20 schools in 5 weeks to 10,000 students, inspiring them through his stories and music. A video of two teachers and one student showing their testimonial about his presentation was released on Forbes' channel on January 24, 2014.

== Track listing ==
All tracks are written by Sean Forbes and Bass Brothers.

Perfect Imperfection track listing
No.	Title	Length
1.	"We Interrupt This Program"	3:37
2.	"I'm Deaf"	3:22
3.	"Crazy About You"	3:40
4.	"Do You Know (What I Mean)"	3:18
5.	"Chill Out Man (Interlude)"	0:58
6.	"Watch These Hands"	3:41
7.	"Def Deaf Girls"	3:21
8.	"Mood Swings"	3:16
9.	"Bob Dylan (Was the First Rapper)"	2:23
10.	"Hammer"	3:09
11.	"The Maze"	3:47
12.	"Let's Mambo"	3:12
13.	"Don't Let Anything Hold You Back"	3:05
14.	"Welcome (Interlude)"	1:00
Total length:		41:45

Bonus DVD track listing
No.	Title	Length
15.	"We Interrupt This Program"
16.	"I'm Deaf"
17.	"Def Deaf Girls"
18.	"Mood Swings"
19.	"Bob Dylan (Was the First Rapper)"
20.	"Hammer"
21.	"Let's Mambo"
