= Andy Babiuk =

American musician and author

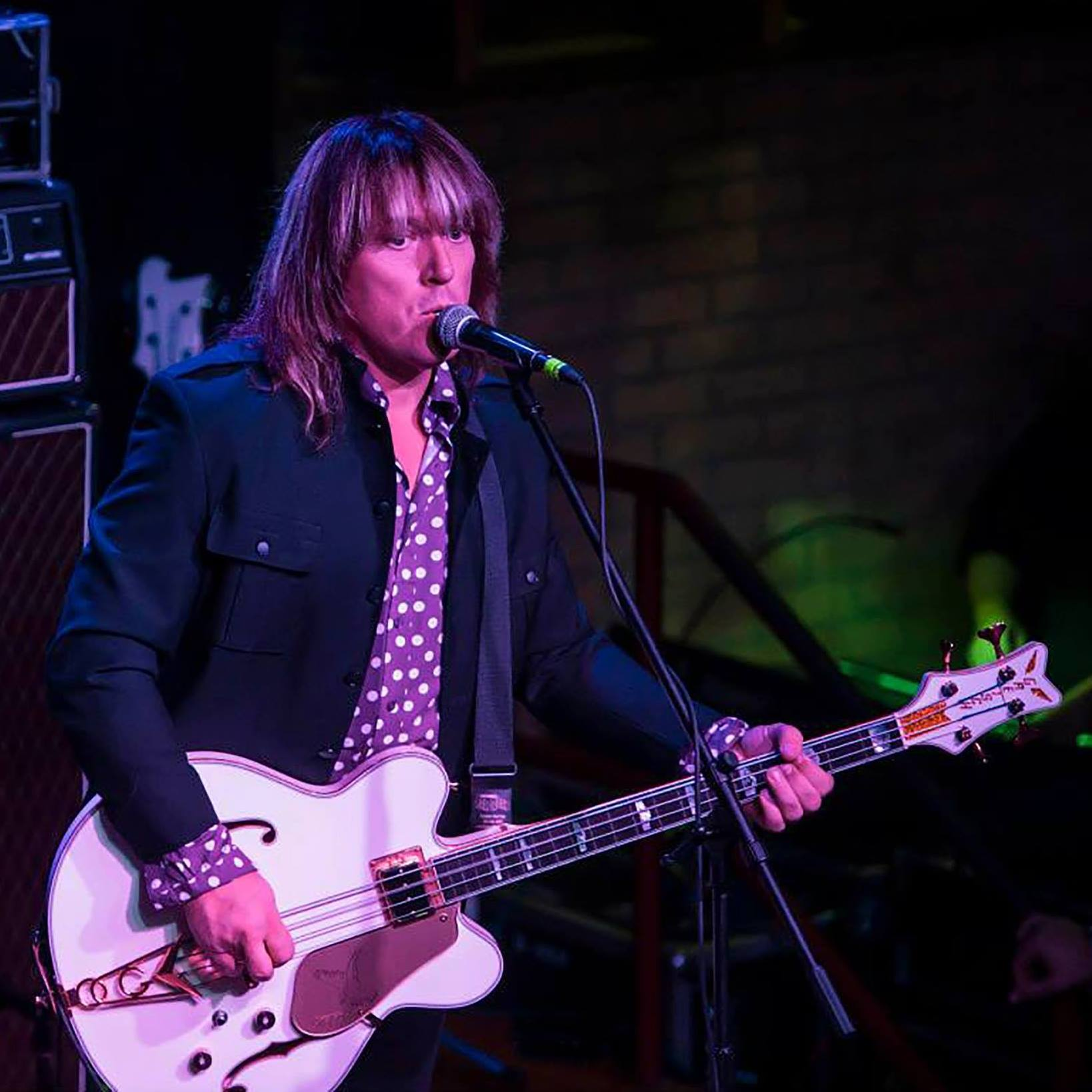

Background information
- Born: Andrew Michael Babiuk; November 27, 1963 (age 62); Rochester, New York, United States
- Genres: Rock and roll, garage rock
- Occupations: Musician, singer-songwriter, producer, author, consultant, vintage guitar/gear expert, small business owner
- Instruments: Bass guitar, guitar, vocals
- Years active: 1979–present
- Labels: Wicked Cool Records, 429/ Universal, Nippon Columbia Japan
- Spouse: Monica Rodgues (married 1990-Present)
- Website: Andybabiuksfabgear.com

Andrew Michael Babiuk (/bəˈbjuːk/ bə-BYOOK; born November 27, 1963) is an American musician, author, consultant, and owner of Andy Babiuk's Fab Gear in Fairport, New York. He is a founding member and bassist of the supergroup The Empty Hearts and is also a longtime member and current frontman of The Chesterfield Kings. Babiuk is the author of Beatles Gear: All the Fab Four's Instruments from Stage to Studio (2001), The Story of Paul Bigsby (2009), Rolling Stones Gear (2014) and Beatles Gear – The Ultimate Edition (2015). He is a staff consultant to the Rock and Roll Hall of Fame as well as to auction houses in New York, London and Los Angeles. Andy also owns and operates the guitar shop Andy Babiuk's Fab Gear which is located in Rochester New York.

== Early years ==
Andrew Michael Babiuk was born on November 27, 1963, in Rochester, New York. He is of Ukrainian descent and both his parents immigrated to the United States from Europe in the early 1950s. Interested in music from a very young age, Babiuk taught himself to play the guitar when he was nine years old.

== Career ==
=== Band member ===
At age 16 while attending high school, Babiuk landed a job at a local music store. There he connected with other local musicians and joined the garage band The Chesterfield Kings in 1979. Babiuk, a member of the band, bassist and songwriter, toured with the Kings throughout the United States, Europe and Canada, helping to breathe life back into a fledging garage band scene. During a career spanning over 30 years, The Chesterfield Kings recorded 11 albums and 15 singles, performed live on television shows such as Jimmy Kimmel Live! and Late Night with Conan O'Brien, and made an appearance on the HBO hit show The Sopranos. The group would go on hiatus in 2011. In 2014, Babiuk, together with Elliot Easton of The Cars, Clem Burke of Blondie and Wally Palmar of The Romantics, formed the supergroup The Empty Hearts. The band released its debut album in August 2014 before touring the United States and Japan. In August 2020, the band released their second album titled The Second Album which featured a guest appearance by Ringo Starr on drums. In 2024 The Chesterfield Kings returned with Andy as the new vocalist and frontman of the group, joined by him are longtime members Mike Boise, Jeff Okolowicz, Ted Okolowicz and newcomer John Cammarosano. They released three brand new singles on Wicked Cool Records "Meet You After Midnight" "Electrified" b/w "My Back Pages" and "Fly The Astral Plane" b/w "So Sad About Us". The Chesterfield Kings released their new studio album We're Still All The Same in October 2024.

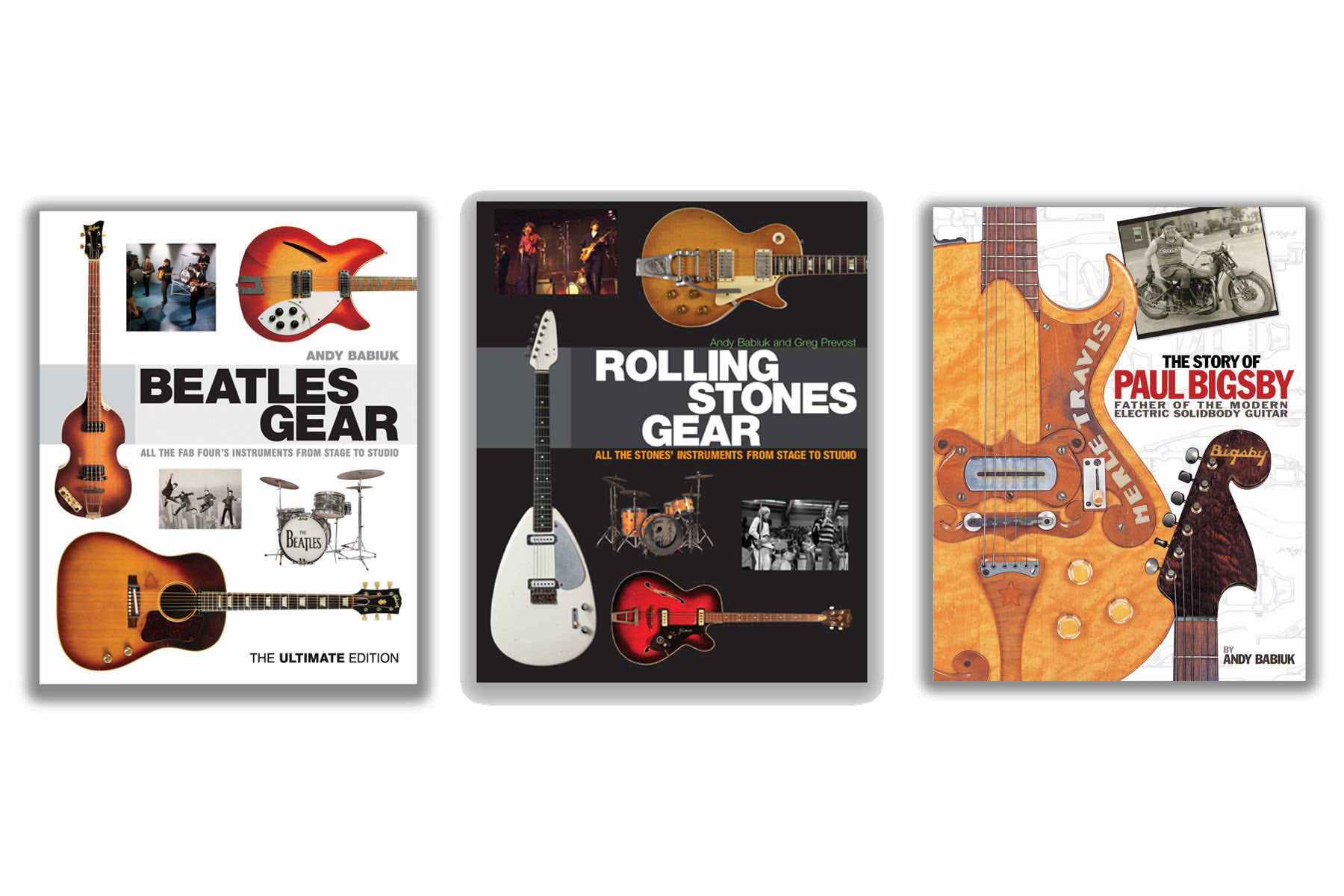
Andy's three books he wrote: Beatles Gear, Rolling Stones Gear, and The Story of Paul Bigsby.

=== Author ===
In early 1990 while still performing with The Chesterfield Kings by night and working at the music store by day, Babiuk saw the need for a book about The Beatles' gear when he tried to emulate some of their recorded sounds with his own band. Babiuk embarked on six years of research for Beatles Gear: All the Fab Four's Instruments, during which time he interviewed over 400 people who worked with or were closely associated with The Beatles, listened to hundreds of recordings, watched miles of film, and amassed a vast library of documents and historic photographic evidence of The Beatles using their instruments and equipment. Released in 2001, Beatles Gear remains a critically acclaimed, best-selling work and has earned Babiuk the respected title of the world's leading authority on all the instruments and equipment used by The Beatles. As a result of the accolade, Babiuk's expertise and notoriety as a vintage guitar expert grew in popularity in very important circles in the music industry. Fred Gretsch of Gretsch Guitars commissioned Babiuk to research and write the Story of Paul Bigsby The Father of the Modern Solid Body Electric Guitar, which was published in 2009. As a follow-up to Beatles Gear, Babiuk worked for nine years researching and writing Rolling Stones Gear, a detailed history of all the equipment used by The Rolling Stones. The book was published in 2014. As had been the case when he did his research for Beatles Gear, Babiuk was granted unprecedented access to and worked directly with members of the Stones and their camp, securing permission to photograph The Rolling Stones' guitars and equipment.

=== Andy Babiuk's Fab Gear ===
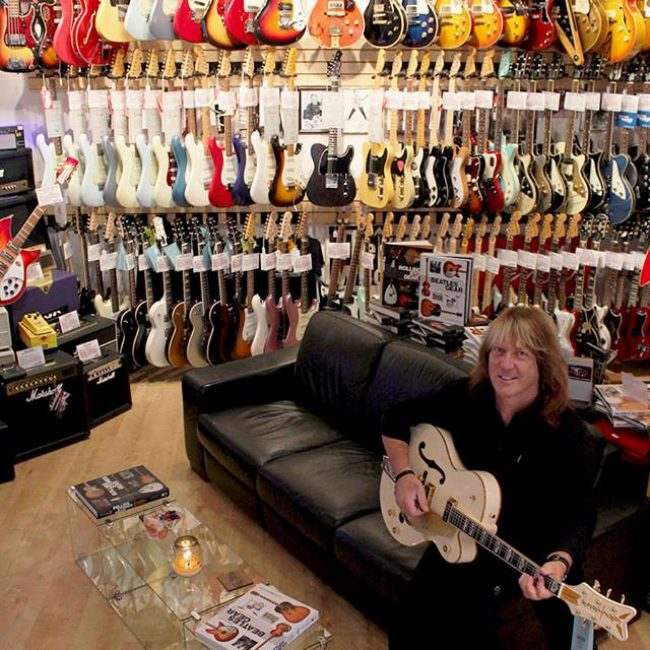
Andy is pictured at his guitar shop Fab Gear

Andy owns and runs Andy Babiuk's Fab Gear, a boutique guitar shop located in Rochester, NY. The shop specializes in guitars, amps and associated musical equipment. Fab Gear sells new and vintage equipment from the top manufacturers in the industry, from iconic brands like Fender, Gretsch, Martin, Rickenbacker, Gibson, Hofner, Vox, Marshall, and more.

Fab Gear was founded in 2007, formerly under the name Tone Bender Music. Andy assists his clients in finding gear to meets their specific needs. These clients range from celebrities in the music industry to the kid down the street who just got their first guitar.

=== Consultant ===
Babiuk served as the Associate Music Supervisor and Technical Consultant on the film Not Fade Away, a drama film released by Paramount Pictures, directed and written by The Sopranos creator David Chase. Babiuk is a staff consultant to the Rock and Roll Hall of Fame and in 2013 he authenticated Bob Dylan's electric guitar which Dylan first played at the Newport Jazz Festival. It sold at auction for just under a million dollars.

In 2015, he authenticated John Lennon's Gibson J-160E that was lost for over 50 years. It sold at auction for 2.4 million dollars. Babiuk also authenticated John Lennon's missing Framus Hootenanny 12-string acoustic guitar, which was used on many Beatles recordings and seen being used in the film Help!. Later that same year George Harrison's Futurama guitar used during the early days of The Beatles was also authenticated by Babiuk.

=== Speaker/Lecturer ===
Babiuk has spoken at multiple venues, including universities about The Beatles equipment and recording process. Having worked directly with The Beatles on his research, he offers a closer, more intimate look at the Fab Four and their collective influence on music and pop culture. Babiuk's book Beatles Gear, has been used in universities for students studying various disciplines ranging from music and audio technology programs to sociology and pop culture.

== Personal life ==
Babiuk is married to his wife Monica, they have six children

== Books ==
- Beatles Gear: All The Fab Four's Instruments From Stage To Studio – November 2001 by Andy Babiuk published by Backbeat Books.
- Der Beatles Sound: Die Fab Four Und Ihre Instrumente- Auf Der Buhne Und Im Studio - Translated into German 2001 PPV Media Germany - von Andy Babiuk
- Beatles Gear: All The Fab Four's Instruments From Stage To Studio Translated into Japanese 2001 Rittor Music Japan
- Harrison By The Editors Of Rolling Stone - The Strings of His Heart by Andy Babiuk 2002 Simon and Schuster
- Beatles Gear, Revised Edition (Revised) [Paperback] Paperback – October 16, 2002 by Andy Babiuk (Author)
- The Story Of Paul A. Bigsby: The Father Of The Modern Electric Solidbody Guitar Jan 1, 2009 by Andy Babiuk
- Limited Edition - The Story Of Paul A. Bigsby: The Father Of The Modern Electric Solidbody Guitar Feb 1, 2009 by Andy Babiuk
- Beatles Gear: All the Fab Four's Instruments from Stage to Studio (Black Book) Dec 1, 2009 by Andy Babiuk
- Beatles Gear: All the Fab Four's Instruments from Stage to Studio (Gretsch Edition) 2009 by Andy Babiuk - Fred Gretsch Enterprises
- Beatles Gear: All the Fab Four's Instruments from Stage to Studio (Epiphone Edition) 2009 by Andy Babiuk - The Epiphone Company
- Beatles Gear Japanese Edition (book) published by Disk Union - by Andy Babiuk 2014
- Rolling Stones Gear: All the Stones' Instruments from Stage to Studio Jan 1, 2014 by Andy Babiuk
- Beatles Gear: All the Fab Four's Instruments from Stage to Studio - The Ultimate Edition November 10, 2015 by Andy Babiuk

== Discography ==
=== Albums ===
- (1982) Here are the Chesterfield Kings (Mirror Records MR-9, 14-song LP)
- (1985) Stop! (Mirror Records MR-10, 12-song LP; also remastered 14-song LP and cassette MR-10R)
- (1987) Don't Open Till Doomsday (Mirror Records MR-12, 14-song LP featuring Dee Dee Ramone, 15-song cassette)
- (1989) The Chesterfield Kings Night Of The Living Eyes (Mirror MR13, CD13 15-song LP, CD, and cassette)
- (1989) Berlin Wall of Sound (Mirror Records MR-15, 15-song CD/cassette, 14-song LP)
- (1990) Drunk On Muddy Water (Mirror Records MCD-16, 13-song limited edition CD)
- (1994) Let's Go Get Stoned (Mirror Records MR-19; 14-song LP, CD, and cassette).
- (1997) Surfin' Rampage (Mirror Records M-23, 32-song double LP and CD)
- (1999) Where the Action Is (Sundazed LSD 13, 17-song CD)
- (2003) The Mindbending Sounds of... (Living Eye / Sundazed, 2003; 14-song CD, 12 song LP - Wicked Cool Records, 2006; 14-song CD)
- (2004) Christmas with the Kranks soundtrack - "Hey Santa Claus" Hollywood Records 2004
- (2008) Psychedelic Sunrise (12-song CD, 12-song LP - Wicked Cool Records, 2008)
- (2009) Got Live...If You Want It (CD, DVD set- Wicked Cool Records, 2009)
- (2013) The Andrew Oldham Orchestra Play the Rolling Stones Songbook, Vol. 2 Paint It, Black - Andrew Oldham Orchestra feat. Andy Babiuk, John Abuiso
- (2014) The Empty Hearts – The Empty Hearts (429 Records/Universal - Nippon Columbia Japan - Universal Australia)
- (2020) The Second Album - The Empty Hearts (Wicked Cool/Orchard/Sony)
- (2024) We're Still All The Same - The Chesterfield Kings (Wicked Cool/Sony)
- (2025) Loose Ends: 1989–2004 Rare, B-Sides & Unreleased (Wicked Cool Records)

=== Singles ===
- "I Ain't No Miracle Worker" b/w "Exit 9" (1979, Living Eye Records, LSD-1; limited edition 500 copies)
- "You Can't Catch Me" b/w "I Won't Be There" (1981, Living Eye Records, LSD-2; limited edition 50 copies)
- "Hey Little Bird" b/w "I Can Only Give You Everything" (1982, Living Eye Records, LSD-3)
- "I'm Going Home" b/w "A Dark Corner" (1982, Mirror Records)
- "She Told Me Lies" b/w "I've Got a Way With Girls" (1984, Mirror Records)
- "Baby Doll" b/w "I Cannot Find Her (acoustic version)" (1987, Mirror Records)
- "Next One In Line" b/w "Talk Talk" and "You Drive Me Nervous" (1991, Mirror Records, MIR45-4, 7-inch EP)
- "Hey Joe" b/w "Roadrunner" (as "The Paisley Zipper Band", 1994, Get Hip Recordings, GH-144)
- "Misty Lane" b/w "Little Girl" (1997, Misty Lane records, Italian fanzine release)
- "Wrong From Right" b/w "So What" (1998, Living Eye Records, LSD-5)
- "Run Rudolph Run" (1998, Living Eye Records, LSD-FC98, fan club Christmas single)
- "Help You Ann" b/w Lyres "She Told Me Lies" (1999, Living Eye Records, LSD-6;each band covers a song originally by the other)
- "She Pays The Rent" b/w Lyres "She Told Me Lies" (2000, Feathered Apple Records, FA-1300;each band covers a song originally by the other)
- "Where Do We Go From Here" b/w "Louie Go Home" (1999, Living Eye / Sundazed Records S-146; vocals by Mark Lindsay of Paul Revere and the Raiders)
- "Yes I Understand" b/w "Sometime At Night" (2001, Sundazed Records; vocals by Sal Valentino of The Beau Brummels)
- "It's Christmastime" b/w "Joyful Noise" (2016, Empty Hearts/ Wicked Cool Records; featuring backing vocals by The Bangles)
- "Coat-Tailer b/w "Run And Hide" (2019, Wicked Cool/Orchard/Sony)
- "Remember Days Like These" b/w "Tell Me Reasons Why" (2020, Wicked Cool/Orchard/Sony; featuring Ringo Starr on drums)
- "Jonathan Harker's Journal" b/w "The Haunting Of The Tin Soldier" (2020, Wicked Cool/Orchard/Sony)
- "Meet You After Midnight" (2024 Wicked Cool Records)
- "Electrified" b/w "My Back Pages" (2024 Wicked Cool Records)
- "Fly The Astral Plane" b/w "So Sad About Us" (2024 Wicked Cool Records)
- (2025) "Your Strange Love" b/w "It's Only Love" (Wicked Cool Records)

=== Bootlegs ===
- Johnny Thunders and the Chesterfield Kings
- Fossils
- Kingsize Rock 'n' Roll Long Ago, Far Away (Paisley Zipper Band)

=== Film ===
- Not Fade Away (2012)
- The Chesterfield Kings' full-length feature film Where is the Chesterfield King? (2000)

=== Television ===
- The Sopranos Season 5 Episode 5
- History Detectives, Season 10 "Bob Dylan's Electric Guitar"
- H2 Lost History "George Harrison's Lucy Les Paul"
- Jimmy Kimmel Live! Season 2004
- Late Night with Conan O'Brien Episode #14.205 September 11, 2007
