= National Breakout =

Studio album by the Romantics
- Released: December 1980
- Recorded: August 1980
- Studio: A&R, New York
- Genre: Pop rock
- Length: 35:17
- Label: Nemperor
- Producer: Peter Solley

The Romantics chronology
The Romantics (1980)	National Breakout (1980)	Strictly Personal (1981)

National Breakout is the second album by the American band the Romantics, released in 1980 on Nemperor Records. It peaked at No. 176 on the Billboard 200.

== Critical reception ==
Professional ratings
Review scores
Source	Rating
AllMusic	3/5 stars

Goldmine opined that "too much of the record is a misguided, somewhat ham-fisted attempt at arena rock, with some just-plain-dumb lyrics."

== Track listing ==
All songs written by Wally Palmar, Jimmy Marinos and Mike Skill, except where noted.

No.	Title	Writer(s)	Length
1.	"Tomboy"		2:28
2.	"Forever Yours"		2:52
3.	"Stone Pony"		2:37
4.	"New Cover Story"		3:02
5.	"A Night Like This"		5:05
6.	"National Breakout"		2:33
7.	"21 and Over"		4:08
8.	"I Can't Tell You Anything"	Palmar, Marinos, Skill, Richard Cole	3:35
9.	"Take Me Out of the Rain"		2:27
10.	"Friday at the Hideout"	David Leone	3:00
11.	"Poor Little Rich Girl"		3:30

== Personnel ==
The Romantics

- Wally Palmar – rhythm guitar
- Mike Skill – lead guitar
- Richard Cole – bass
- Jimmy Marinos – drums

Technical

- Peter Solley – producer
- Steve Brown – engineer
- Gerard McConville – assistant engineer
- Greg Calbi – mastering
- The Romantics – album concept
- Karen Katz – cover design
- Sheila Linz – hand coloring
- David Tan – photography
