= Rhythm Romance =

Studio album by the Romantics
- Released: 1985
- Recorded: April–May 1985
- Studio: Criteria Studios (Miami, Florida); New River Studios (Fort Lauderdale, Florida)
- Genre: Rock
- Length: 35:27
- Label: Nemperor
- Producer: Peter Solley; Gordon Fordyce; The Romantics

The Romantics chronology
In Heat (1983)	Rhythm Romance (1985)	61/49 (2003)

Rhythm Romance is the fifth album by Detroit-based rock band the Romantics, released on Nemperor Records in 1985. It peaked at No. 72 on the Billboard Hot 100.

== Critical reception ==
Professional ratings
Review scores
Source	Rating
AllMusic	2/5 stars

On Rhythm Romance, the Romantics had moved further away from their power pop roots towards more mainstream rock. In a retrospective review for AllMusic, Chris Woodstra opined that the band had become "full-fledged arena rockers complete with a big ultraslick production... and an utterly forgettable batch of songs."

Trouser Press called it "another likably dumb batch of pop songs culminating in a credibly rootsy version of "Poison Ivy."

== Track listing ==
All tracks written by Wally Palmar, Coz Canler and Mike Skill, except where noted.

No.	Title	Writer(s)	Length
1.	"Let's Get Started"		3:58
2.	"Mystified"		3:29
3.	"Be My Everything"		3:52
4.	"Test of Time"		3:24
5.	"I Got It If You Want It"		3:26
6.	"Rhythm Romance"	Palmar, Canler, Skill, David Petratos	3:48
7.	"Never Thought It Would Be Like This"	Palmar, Canler, Skill, Peter Solley	3:34
8.	"Better Make a Move"		3:19
9.	"Make It Last"		3:41
10.	"Poison Ivy"	Jerry Leiber, Mike Stoller	2:56

== Personnel ==
The Romantics

- Wally Palmar – lead vocals, rhythm guitar, harmonica
- Coz Canler – lead guitar, backing vocals
- Mike Skill – bass, guitar, backing vocals
- David Petratos – drums, backing vocals

Additional personnel

- Peter Solley – keyboards, production, mixing
- Gordon Fordyce – production, engineer, mixing
- The Romantics – co-production, cover concept
- David Axelbaum – assistant engineer
- Ted Stein – assistant engineer
- Mike Fuller – mastering
- Chris Austopchuk – art direction
- Larry Williams – cover photography
