= Clem Burke =

American drummer (1954–2025)

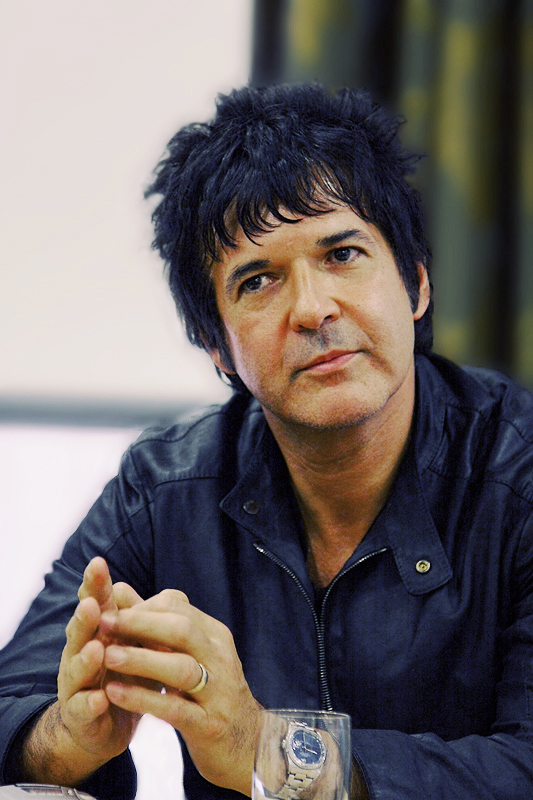
- Burke in 2008

Background information
- Also known as: Clement Burke; Elvis Ramone
- Born: Clement Anthony Bozewski; November 24, 1954; Bayonne, New Jersey, U.S.
- Died: April 6, 2025 (aged 70)
- Genres: Punk rock; new wave; hard rock; post-punk; garage rock; pop rock
- Occupation: Drummer
- Instruments: Drums
- Years active: 1960s–2025
- Formerly of: Blondie; Chequered Past; The Fleshtones; The Romantics; Ramones; Dramarama; The Adult Net; The Split Squad; The International Swingers; L.A.M.F.; The Plimsouls; Slinky Vagabond; Go-Gos; The Empty Hearts; Lust for Life

Clement Anthony Burke (né Bozewski; November 24, 1954 – April 6, 2025) was an American musician. He was the drummer for the band Blondie, joining shortly after its formation in 1975 and remaining with the band until his death in 2025. He appeared on all of the band's albums with two of the founding members, Debbie Harry and Chris Stein. He was drummer for the Ramones for a brief time in 1987 under the name Elvis Ramone, and played on albums by other artists, including Eurythmics, Bob Dylan and Iggy Pop. He was a member of the Romantics from 1990 until 2004.

== Life and career ==
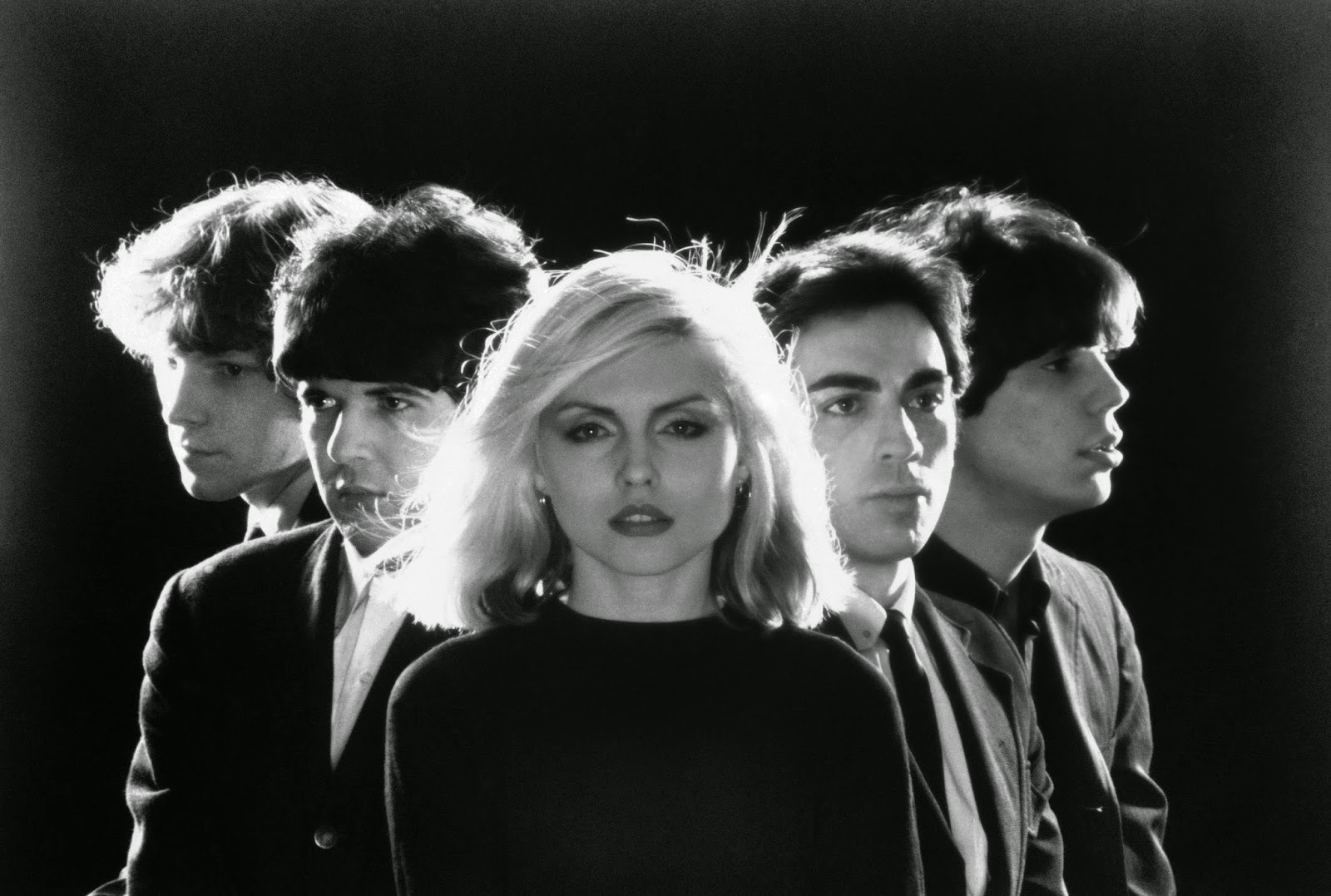
Burke (second from left) with Blondie in 1976

Clement Anthony Bozewski was born on November 24, 1954, in Bayonne, New Jersey, the son of Clement J. Bozewski and Antoinette (née Terraciano). His father, a drummer who played in local clubs, taught him to drum from an early age and he played in a school marching band.

His early experiences on the drum kit began in the late 1960s and early 1970s, playing in various New Jersey jam bands. Burke also gained percussion knowledge from his stint as a drummer in the St Andrew's Bridgemen Drum and Bugle Corps in Bayonne. He was recruited by Debbie Harry and Chris Stein when Blondie was first forming in 1974 and joined the band in early 1975. He was a key figure in keeping the group together when Stein and Harry considered disbanding after their original bassist, Fred Smith, departed to Television. Burke recruited his friend Gary Valentine to play bass. Burke's style of drumming was influenced by Hal Blaine, Keith Moon, Ringo Starr and Earl Palmer.

During the 1980s and 1990s when Blondie was on hiatus, Burke played drums for the Romantics (for whom he was the regular drummer between 1990 and 2004), Pete Townshend, Bob Dylan, Eurythmics, Dramarama, the Fleshtones, Iggy Pop, Joan Jett and The Stranglers amongst others.

He recorded with the line-up of Chequered Past in 1983 with Sex Pistols guitarist Steve Jones, former Blondie bandmate Nigel Harrison, bass guitarist and vocalist Tony Sales, and singer/actor Michael Des Barres.

In 1987, Burke sat in as drummer for the Ramones for two gigs, under the name "Elvis Ramone", on August 28 in Providence, Rhode Island, and August 29 in Trenton, New Jersey at the punk club The City Gardens, after the sudden departure of Richie Ramone. On October 8, 2004, he again played under the name "Elvis Ramone" when he joined Tommy Ramone, C. J. Ramone, and Daniel Rey in the "Ramones Beat on Cancer" concert.

He recorded and played live with Wanda Jackson and Nancy Sinatra. Burke recorded with Sonny Vincent, and Arthur Killer Kane, and played on the Go-Go's member Kathy Valentine's solo release Light Years in 2005. He recorded and toured with Dramarama from Wayne, New Jersey and Los Angeles on their 1993 album Hi-Fi Sci-Fi.

Burke was inducted into the Rock and Roll Hall of Fame in 2006 as a member of Blondie. In 2007 he joined Slinky Vagabond with David Bowie guitarist Earl Slick, Glen Matlock and Keanan Duffty, who were playing their debut concert at the Joey Ramone Birthday Bash in May 2007. He was also a member of Magic Christian (Dirty Water Records), along with Flamin' Groovies guitarist Cyril Jordan (on guitar) and Plimsouls lead guitarist Eddie Munoz (on bass), and toured several times as drummer with the Hugh Cornwell Band.

Burke played 90-minute sets in 100 concerts in a year. In 2008, it was reported that he had taken part in an eight-year study that analysed the physical and psychological effects of drumming and the stamina required by professional drummers, conducted jointly by the University of Gloucestershire and the University of Chichester. In July 2011, Burke received an honorary doctorate from the University of Gloucestershire as a result of the drumming project. In 2008, Burke founded the Clem Burke Drumming project to investigate the physical and mental-health benefits of drumming.

In December 2011, Burke formed the band the International Swingers with Sex Pistols bass player Glen Matlock, guitarist James Stevenson of Generation X and singer Gary Twinn of Supernaut. About the same time he became a founding member of the Split Squad, participating in tours, appearances at SXSW festivals, and in the recording of the album, Now Hear This..., released in January 2014.

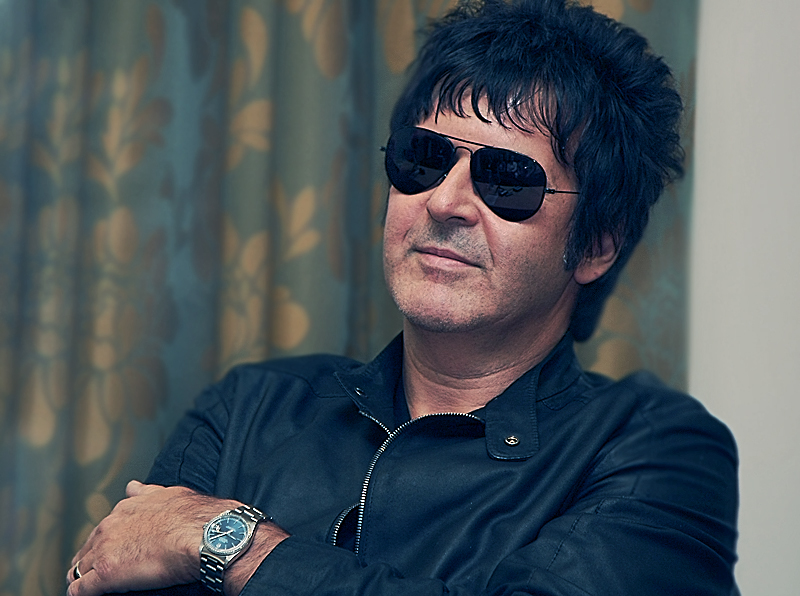
Burke in 2008

In April 2013, Burke appeared on the Little Steven song "All I Needed Was You" along with Scott Kempner, Barry Goldberg, Gregg Sutton and Tom Jr Morgan on the Carla Olson album Have Harmony, Will Travel. In 2014, Burke was a founding member of the Empty Hearts. The group recorded on 429 Records and his bandmates included the Romantics guitarist and vocalist Wally Palmar, the Chesterfield Kings bassist Andy Babiuk, the Cars guitarist Elliot Easton and Small Faces and Faces pianist Ian McLagan. The band's self-titled first album was released August 5, 2014, and produced by Ed Stasium.

In 2015, via PledgeMusic, the band the International Swingers raised the money to record their first full-length self-titled album, The International Swingers (originally under the working title Whatever Works Now). The album was recorded at Studio 606 in Los Angeles which is owned by the Foo Fighters. It was mixed by Peter Walsh, who had worked with Simple Minds, Pulp and Scott Walker.

In 2017, Burke played dates as a member of L.A.M.F., a Johnny Thunders tribute also featuring Walter Lure, Mike Ness and Glen Matlock. The reunion shows in New York took place at the Bowery Electric in Manhattan on November 15 and 16, 2016, (without Glen Matlock) and were recorded for an album, released on Jungle Records in December 2017. In 2019, Burke played with Blondie tribute act Bootleg Blondie. In December 2021, Burke filled in on drums for Gina Schock during the Go-Go's show at the Whisky a Go Go, to celebrate their recent induction into the Rock and Roll Hall of Fame.

In 2022, Burke was awarded an Honorary Doctorate of Music by the University of Chichester.

Burke died from cancer on April 6, 2025, at age 70.

== Discography ==
NOTE: This list includes albums in which Clem Burke was a band member or the featured drummer.

With Blondie

- Blondie (1976)
- Plastic Letters (1977)
- Parallel Lines (1978)
- Eat to the Beat (1979)
- Autoamerican (1980)
- The Hunter (1982)
- No Exit (1999)
- The Curse of Blondie (2003)
- Panic of Girls (2011)
- Ghosts of Download (2014)
- Pollinator (2017)
- High Noon (2027)

With The Adult Net

- The Honey Tangle (1989)

With BP Fallon & The Bandits

- Still Legal (2013)

With Carla Olson

- Have Harmony, Will Travel (2013)

With Chequered Past

- Chequered Past (1984)

With The Delphines

- The Delphines (1996)

With Dramarama

- Hi-Fi Sci-Fi (1993)

With The Empty Hearts

- The Empty Hearts (2014)
- The Second Album (2020)

With Eurythmics

- In the Garden (1981)
- Revenge (1986)

With Iggy Pop

- Zombie Birdhouse (1982)

With The International Swingers

- The International Swingers (2015)

With Jimmy Destri

- Heart on a Wall (1981)

With Kathy Valentine

- Light Years (2005)

With Magic Christian

- Evolver (2009)

With Mark Owen

- Green Man (1996)

With Miss Derringer

- Lullabies (2006)

With Pete Townshend

- White City: A Novel (1985)

With The Plimsouls

- Kool Trash (1998)

With The Romantics

- Made in Detroit (1993)
- 61/49 (2003)

With Sonny Vincent, Arthur Kane, Rick Ballard

- A Tribute To Mr. Rock' Chuck Berry Tribute- Carol (2004)

With The 69 Cats

- Transylvanian Tapes (2014)

With The Split Squad

- Now Hear This... (2014)

With Walter Lure

- L.A.M.F. Live At The Bowery Electric (2017)
