= Chesterfield Kings =

Chesterfield Kings may refer to:

- Chesterfield Kings (cigarette), an American brand of unfiltered cigarette made by Chesterfield (cigarette)
- The Chesterfield Kings, an American rock band
