= The Romantics (album) =

Studio album by The Romantics
- Released: January 4, 1980
- Recorded: September 1979
- Genres: Power pop, new wave
- Length: 37:30
- Label: Nemperor
- Producer: Pete Solley

The Romantics chronology
The Romantics (1980)	National Breakout (1980)

Professional ratings
Review scores
Source	Rating
AllMusic	4/5 stars

The Romantics is the debut album of American rock band the Romantics, released on January 4, 1980, under Nemperor Records. It includes the Billboard Hot 100 hit "What I Like About You", which peaked at No. 49.

== Track listing ==
All songs written by Palmar/Marinos/Skill (Copyright ForeverEndeavor Music), except where noted.

No.	Title	Writer(s)	Length
1.	"When I Look in Your Eyes"		3:02
2.	"Tell It to Carrie"		3:23
3.	"First in Line"		2:38
4.	"Keep in Touch"		3:42
5.	"Girl Next Door"		4:41
6.	"What I Like About You"		2:55
7.	"She's Got Everything"	Ray Davies	2:35
8.	"Till I See You Again"		3:53
9.	"Hung on You"		3:26
10.	"Little White Lies"		2:39
11.	"Gimme One More Chance"		4:28

== Charts ==
Chart (1980)	Peak position
Australia (Kent Music Report)	78
United States (Billboard 200)	61

== Personnel ==
The Romantics

- Wally Palmar - lead vocals and backing vocals, rhythm guitar, harmonica
- Mike Skill - lead guitar, backing vocals
- Rich Cole - bass, lead vocals on "Till I See You Again", backing vocals
- Jimmy Marinos - drums, percussion, lead vocals on "What I Like About You"

== Production ==
- Recorded at Coconuts Recording N Miami Beach Fl
- Produced by Pete Solley for Spyder Records
- Recorded and engineered by Steve Brown
- Assistant Engineer Hal Hansford
- Mastered by Greg Calbi
