= The Empty Hearts =

American rock music supergroup

- Origin: New York City, United States
- Genres: Garage rock, rock and roll
- Years active: 2013–present
- Labels: 429 Records, Wicked Cool Records
- Spinoffs: The Chesterfield Kings, Blondie, The Cars, The Romantics, Small Faces, The Ramones
- Members: Elliot Easton; Wally Palmar; Andy Babiuk; Zak Starkey
- Past members: Ian McLagan: Clem Burke
- Website: theemptyhearts.com

The Empty Hearts are an American garage rock supergroup band formed in New York City in 2013. which produced its first album and launched its first tour in 2014.

== Background ==
The band was founded in 2013 by The Chesterfield Kings bassist Andy Babiuk and a roster of founding members including Blondie drummer Clem Burke, The Cars guitarist Elliot Easton, and The Romantics guitarist and vocalist Wally Palmar. Palmar also plays the harmonica on the band's self-titled first album, which was released 5 August 2014 and produced by The Ramones producer Ed Stasium. The band included Small Faces and Faces pianist Ian McLagan on Hammond organ and Wurlitzer until his death in December 2014. The group says that the album took just five days to complete at Babiuk's Fab Gear Studios in Rochester, N.Y. with many of the songs being recorded in a single take. The group's name was suggested by Steven Van Zandt whose Wicked Cool Records label had released three of Babiuk's Chesterfield Kings albums. The band's first concert date was 16 October 2014 at Londonderry, New Hampshire's Tupelo Music Hall. The band performed at the NAMM Show in January 2016 and at the 85th annual Hollywood Christmas Parade in 2016.

The band's "Second Album" was released on August 28, 2020. Official videos from the album included the songs, "Jonathan Harker's Journal," "The World's Gone Insane," "Coat-Tailer," and "Come On and Try It." The song, "Remember Days Like These" featured Ringo Starr and was released as a limited edition 45 rpm vinyl single with the song, "Tell Me Reasons Why." The band did not tour in support of the album.

== Personnel ==
=== Current lineup ===
- Andy Babiuk – bass (2013–present)
- Elliot Easton – guitars (2013–present)
- Wally Palmar – lead vocals, guitar (2013–present)
- Zak Starkey – drums (2026–present)

=== Former members ===
- Ian McLagan – keyboards, organ (2013–2014; his death)
- Clem Burke – drums (2013–2025; his death)

== Discography ==
=== Albums ===
- The Empty Hearts (2014)
- The Second Album (2020)

=== Singles ===
- "It's Christmastime/Joyful Noise" (2017)
- "Coat-Tailer/Run And Hide From You" (2019)
- "Remember Days Like These (feat. Ringo Starr)/Tell Me Reasons Why" (2020)
