= Strictly Personal (The Romantics album) =

Studio album by the Romantics
- Released: October 1981
- Recorded: August 1981
- Studio: Mediasound, New York
- Genre: Pop rock
- Length: 33:22
- Label: Nemperor
- Producer: Mike Stone

The Romantics chronology
National Breakout (1980)	Strictly Personal (1981)	In Heat (1983)

Professional ratings
Review scores
Source	Rating
AllMusic	2.5/5 stars

Strictly Personal is the third album by the Romantics. It was released in 1981 on Nemperor Records.

== Track listing ==
All tracks written by Jimmy Marinos, Wally Palmar and Coz Canler, except where noted.

No.	Title	Writer(s)	Length
1.	"In the Nighttime"		3:41
2.	"Look at Her"		2:58
3.	"No One Like You"		3:08
4.	"Bop"		2:03
5.	"Why'd You Leave Me"		3:27
6.	"Can't Get Over You"	Marinos, Palmar, Canler, Richard Cole	3:09
7.	"C'mon Girl (Work Out With Me)"		2:28
8.	"Spend a Little Love on Me"		2:41
9.	"She's Hot"	Marinos, Palmar, Canler, Cole	2:35
10.	"All That I Want"		3:31
11.	"Don't You Put Me on Hold"		2:41

== Personnel ==
The Romantics

- Coz Canler – lead guitar
- Wally Palmar – rhythm guitar
- Richard Cole – bass guitar
- Jimmy Marinos – drums

Technical

- Mike Stone – producer, engineer
- Don Wershba – assistant engineer
- Michael Halsband – photography
- Alex Marinos – album concept, design
