= In Heat (The Romantics album) =

Studio album by the Romantics
- Released: 1983
- Recorded: May–June 1983
- Studio: Criteria, Miami
- Genre: New wave
- Length: 33:38
- Label: Nemperor
- Producer: Peter Solley

The Romantics chronology
| Strictly Personal (1981) | In Heat (1983) | Rhythm Romance (1985) |

Singles from In Heat
- 1. "Talking in Your Sleep" Released: September 9, 1983; 2. "Rock You Up" Released: 1983; 3. "One in a Million" Released: 1984

In Heat is the fourth album by the American band the Romantics. It was released in 1983 on Nemperor Records. It was the Romantics' most commercially successful album, and featured the Romantics' biggest hit single: "Talking in Your Sleep", peaking at No. 3, and a second top 40 hit, "One in a Million", charted No. 37.

== Critical reception ==
Professional ratings
Review scores
| Source | Rating |
|---|---|
| AllMusic | 3.5/5 stars |
| The Rolling Stone Album Guide | 2.5/5 stars |
| The Village Voice | B+ |

The Philadelphia Daily News wrote: "On the one hand, this group has always been nothing more than a sharp- witted AOR aspirant—not even always so sharp-witted. On the other, 'Rock You Up' finally pays off on that ambition with a really relentless riff and the best vocal Wally Palmar has ever pulled off."

== Track listing ==
All songs written by the Romantics, except where noted.

| No. | Title | Writer(s) | Length |
|---|---|---|---|
| 1. | "Rock You Up" | | 3:34 |
| 2. | "Do Me Anyway You Wanna" | | 3:19 |
| 3. | "Got Me Where You Want Me" | | 3:02 |
| 4. | "One in a Million" | | 3:40 |
| 5. | "Open Up Your Door" | Raymond Bloodworth, Larry Russell Brown, Neval Nader | 3:57 |
| 6. | "Talking in Your Sleep" | Canler, Marinos, Palmar, Skill, Peter Solley | 3:54 |
| 7. | "Love Me to the Max" | | 3:06 |
| 8. | "Diggin' on You" | | 2:58 |
| 9. | "I'm Hip" | | 2:40 |
| 10. | "Shake a Tail Feather" | Otha Hayes, Verlie Rice, Andre Williams | 3:28 |

== Personnel ==
Musicians

- Wally Palmar - lead vocals and backing vocals, rhythm guitar and harmonica
- Coz Canler - lead guitar and backing vocals
- Mike Skill - bass, additional guitar and backing vocals
- Jimmy Marinos - drums and lead vocals

Additional personnel

- Peter Solley - synthesizers, producer and mixing
- Jim Sessody - engineer
- Hal Hansford - engineer
- Neil Kernon - mixing
- Mike Fuller - mastering
- John Berg - art direction
- David Kennedy - photography

== Certifications ==
- US - Gold
- Canada - Gold
