= Strictly Personal (disambiguation) =

Strictly Personal is a 1968 album by Captain Beefheart and his Magic Band. It may also refer to:

- Strictly Personal (The Romantics album), released in 1981
- Strictly Personal (film), a 1933 drama
- “Strictly Personal”, a weekday syndicated newspaper column written by Sydney J. Harris
- Strictly Personal, a 1941 autobiography by W. Somerset Maugham - see List of works by W. Somerset Maugham
- Strictly Personal, a 1974 book by John Eisenhower
- Strictly Personal: Manmohan and Gursharan, a book by Daman Singh
- “Strictly Personal”, a 1995 episode of British TV series The Bill
- “Strictly Personal”, an episode of the 1986 American sitcom Mr. Sunshine

== See also ==
- Strictement personnel (English translation: Strictly Personal), a 1985 French film directed and written by Pierre Jolivet
