= Infinite (Eminem song) =

- Whole jacket of the cassette single

Song by Eminem

from the album Infinite
- Released: November 12, 1996
- Recorded: December 1995
- Studio: Bassment Sounds Inc. (Ferndale, MI)
- Genre: Hip hop
- Length: 4:11
- Label: WEB Entertainment
- Songwriters: Marshall Mathers; Denaun Porter
- Producer: Denaun Porter

Music video
- "Infinite (F.B.T. Remix)" (Official Audio) on YouTube

"Infinite" is a song by American rapper Eminem from his debut album of the same name (1996). It was released along with the rest of the album on November 12, 1996, via Web Entertainment. Recording sessions took place at Bassment Studios in Ferndale, Michigan, produced by Denaun Porter.

For a long time, the song was not available at any online music stores; however, on November 17, 2016, five days after the 20th anniversary of the album, Eminem posted a remaster and a remix of the song, made by the Bass Brothers, to his Vevo channel, made available digitally for the first time.

The song peaked at number 97 on the Billboard Hot 100 and at number 37 on the Hot R&B/Hip-Hop Songs chart.

== Personnel ==
"Infinite"

- Marshall Mathers – main artist, vocals, songwriter, co-producer
- Denaun Porter – producer, songwriter
- Mathew "DJ Butterfinger" Ruby – scratches
- Kevin Wilder – recording, mixing
- Robert "Flipside" Handy – recording, mixing

"Infinite (F.B.T. Remix)"

- Marshall Mathers – main artist, vocals, songwriter
- Jeff Bass – producer
- Mark Bass – producer
- Jake Bass – co-producer

== Charts ==
Chart (2016)	Peak position
US Billboard Hot 100	97
US Hot R&B/Hip-Hop Songs (Billboard)	37
