= 61/49 =

Studio album by the Romantics
- Released: September 9, 2003
- Genre: Pop rock
- Length: 36:52
- Label: WEB Entertainment

The Romantics chronology
Rhythm Romance (1985)	61/49 (2003)

Professional ratings
Review scores
Source	Rating
Allmusic	4/5 stars

61/49 is the sixth studio album by the Romantics. It was released by WEB Entertainment in 2003, 18 years after their previous album Rhythm Romance, marking their biggest gap between their releases.

== Track listing ==
All tracks are written by Coz Canler, Wally Palmar, Mike Skill, except where noted.

No.	Title	Writer(s)	Length
1.	"Devil in Me"		3:30
2.	"61/49"		3:48
3.	"Midnight to Six Man"	Phil May, Dick Taylor	3:20
4.	"When Will It End"	Coz Canler, J.D. Martin, Wally Palmar, Mike Skill	3:36
5.	"Out of My Mind (Into My Head)"	Canler, Martin, Palmar, Skill	3:31
6.	"When the Angels (Hear Me Callin')"		4:17
7.	"New Kinda Pain"	Canler, Martin, Palmar, Skill	3:23
8.	"I Need You"	Ray Davies	2:29
9.	"Paint the Sky"		4:37
10.	"Still We Remain"		4:21

== Personnel ==
=== The Romantics ===
- Wally Palmar – vocals, guitar, harmonica
- Mike Skill – bass guitar, vocals
- Coz Canler – guitar, vocals
- Clem Burke – drums on tracks 8–9

=== Additional musicians ===
- Jimmy Marinos – drums on tracks 1–3, 5–6
- Johnny "Bee" Badanjek – drums on tracks 4 & 7
- Eddie Hawrysch – Wurlitzer electric piano on track 5
- Luis Resto – Hammond organ on tracks 6 & 9, Mellotron and tympanis on track 9, accordion and concertina on track 10.
- Tino – guiro on track 6
- Joel Marin – electric 12-string on track 7
- Michael Millman – string bass, cellos on track 9
- Doug Nahory – piano, harpsichord on track 10
- Bruce Witkin – percussion on track 10
- Fountain Day School 4th grade – vocals on track 10
