= Sean Forbes =

American rapper (born 1982)

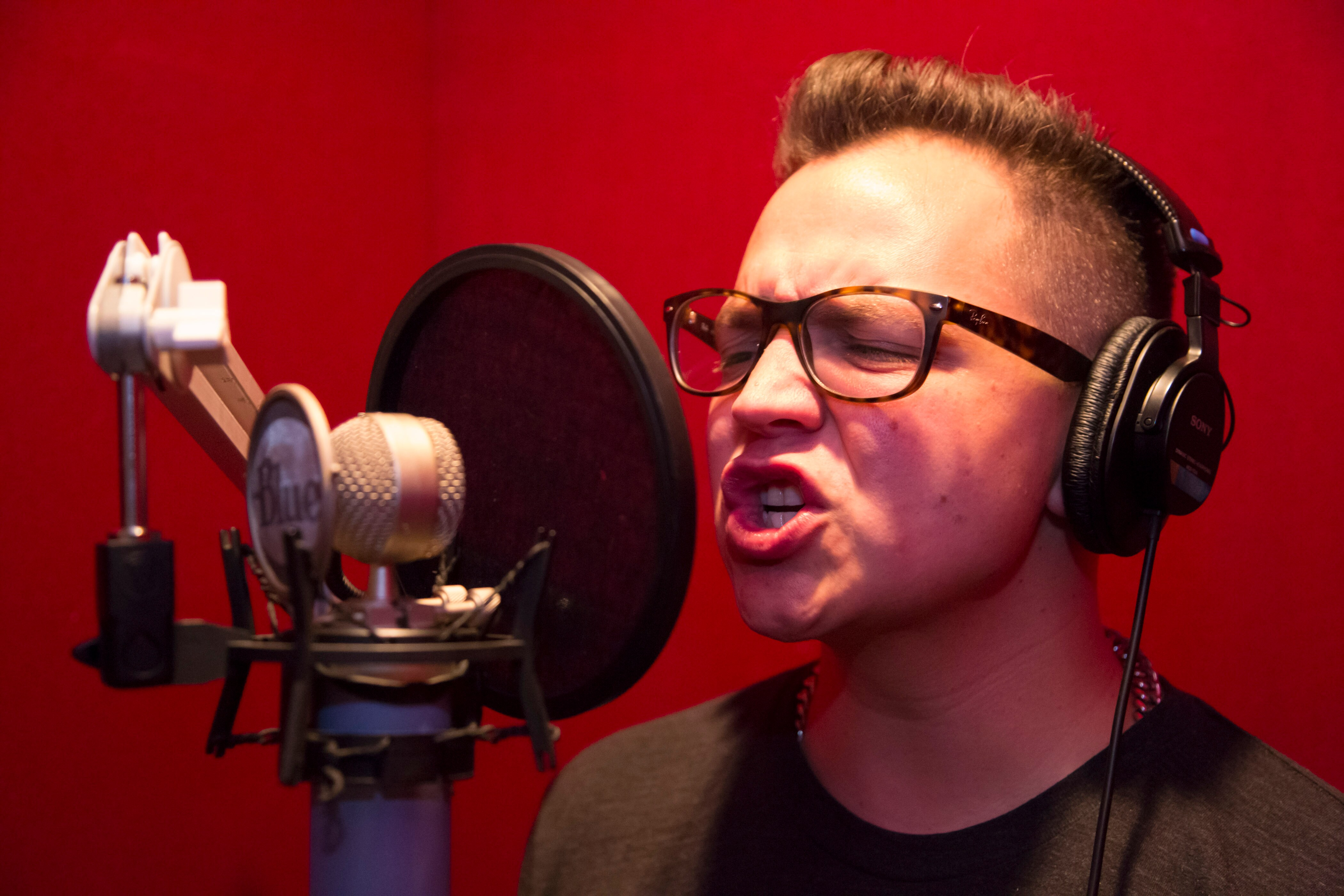
- Sean rapping at 54 Sound, 2015

Background information
- Born: Sean Patrick Forbes; February 5, 1982 (age 44); Detroit, Michigan, U.S.
- Genres: Hip hop, rock
- Occupations: Rapper, singer, speaker
- Instruments: Vocals, hand, drums
- Years active: 2005–present
- Labels: Web Entertainment; D-PAN Entertainment; Kobalt; Two Blown Speakers
- Website: www.deafandloud.com

Sean Patrick Forbes (born February 5, 1982) is an American hip hop recording artist.

Identifying as Deaf, he is the co-founder of D-PAN, The Deaf Professional Arts Network, a 501c3 nonprofit organization founded in 2006 to make music more accessible to the Deaf and Hard-of-Hearing community. D-PAN has created American Sign Language interpretation music videos of popular songs. D-PAN has created videos for John Mayer, Christina Aguilera, Eminem, White Stripes, Owl City, Carly Rae Jepsen, The Clark Sisters, Imagine Dragons, and more. D-PAN works with production companies to produce American Sign Language access videos, captions, and transcripts.

In 2010, Sean signed a record deal with Web Entertainment, the same label that discovered and produced Eminem, and released his first song "I'm Deaf" with a music video. In 2011, he released his 2nd single "Let's Mambo" with Academy Award winning actress Marlee Matlin playing his love interest. In 2012, Sean released a full-length CD/DVD album titled Perfect Imperfection.

In February 2020, Sean released his second album "Little Victories" and immediately shot up to the #1 spot on several music charts.

On February 13, 2022, Forbes performed in the Super Bowl LVI halftime show in ASL.

== Life and career ==
=== Early life ===
When Sean was only a year old, he lost 90% of his hearing. Sean became Deaf most likely from spinal meningitis when he was just a few months old. The cause was never officially diagnosed but Sean has said that the doctors had suspected spinal meningitis. Born into a musical family, Sean's father Scott Forbes was one-half of the Detroit country-rock group The Forbes Brothers. His uncle, Dennis Forbes, the other half of The Forbes Brothers, was a well-respected engineer who worked closely with Bob Seger. Sean grew up playing music with his siblings. When Sean was five years old, his parents bought him a drum set after seeing him follow along to all of the songs that his parents played on the radio, especially "Devil with a Blue Dress" by Mitch Ryder and the Detroit Wheels. Johnny "Bee" Badanjek, the drummer for Mitch Ryder and the Detroit Wheels, was a good friend of Sean's dad and would come over to the house and teach Sean how to drum. This started a lifelong mission for Sean to find a way into the music business. When he was ten, Sean started writing songs and playing guitar.

In high school, Sean played in a band with childhood friends. He had dreams to be a drummer but knew first hand as a deaf person this would be extremely difficult. He attended the Rochester Institute of Technology, where the National Technical Institute for the Deaf is located. While attending RIT Sean noticed that there were many Deaf and Hard-of-Hearing people that loved music, but didn't have the same access to music Sean had while growing up. Fond with lyrics, Sean would often interpret into American Sign Language many of his favorite songs. After his 3rd year at RIT, he decided to take a leave of absence from school and move back home to Detroit to figure out what was next for him. While attending The Detroit Music Awards, Sean met recording studio owner and Eminem publisher Joel Martin. As the story goes, Martin gave Forbes a piece of paper that said "Free Eminem Tickets E-mail Me" which fueled Forbes to e-mail Martin asking if he could work at the studio. Realizing that it would be tough to make it in the music business Sean returned to RIT to continue his education eventually completing a bachelor's degree in 2008.

=== The Deaf Professional Arts Network ===
In 2006 while still a student at RIT, Sean went on spring break with friends to Gallaudet University, a college for the deaf. It was during this trip that he started signing every song he knew into sign language. This spurred the idea of creating American Sign Language music videos for the Deaf. Reaching out to a friend, Adrean Mangiardi, who was studying film at RIT, Sean asked him if he could make a music video of him signing Eminem's song "Lose Yourself". Upon making the video Forbes called Joel Martin, owner of 54 sound, whom he had been emailing for over a year now if he could stop by the studio to show him something he had been working on. Forbes went to the studio and to his surprise Eminem was sitting in the room. Forbes proceeded to show Martin and Eminem his American Sign Language rendition of Eminem's academy award-winning song "Lose Yourself" to which they were both impressed with. They immediately asked Forbes what he wanted to do with this, and hired him to work at the studio that summer to "come up with a job for himself" Forbes realized that there was an abundance of talent in the Deaf community who had the ability to sign songs into American Sign Language and more than anything wanted to recognize these talents. Martin and Forbes co-founded the Deaf Professional Arts Network to make music and music culture accessible to the deaf and hard of hearing community by featuring deaf performers expressing the songs' lyrics in American Sign Language.

The first ASL music video that they created was for a song called Where'd You Go by Fort Minor, a group founded by Mike Shinoda (famous for his role in Linkin Park). Upon completing the video, D-PAN shared the video with Shinoda who dismissed it and didn't want to endorse the video. This upset Forbes thinking that musicians didn't want to make their music accessible to the 30 million plus members of the Deaf and Hard-of-Hearing community. D-PAN then set out to find an artist who had a song and message that would resonate with the deaf community. This led them to Waiting on the World to Change by John Mayer. The D-PAN music video features many members of the Deaf and Hard-of-Hearing community, many who had never experienced music. This music video became an anthem for the Deaf community. To date, D-PAN has created music videos for Christina Aguilera's "Beautiful", Eminem's "Lose Yourself" (featuring Forbes), Owl City's "Fireflies", and with the support of Jack White from The White Stripes, they created a music video for The White Stripes' "We're Going to Be Friends", which has received millions of views on YouTube.

In 2008 D-PAN released "It's Everybody's Music" a DVD compilation that has sold over 10,000 copies.

=== "I'm Deaf" and "Let's Mambo" (2010–2011) ===
While establishing D-PAN Forbes was writing lyrics and had dreams of performing original material. Due to a lack of a partner to work with and great music to write to, Forbes was making his own beats but didn't feel that the material was strong enough to do something with. One day while working at 54 Sound, Forbes found a CD that said "Beats" on it and without telling anyone stole the CD and took it home. He immediately was drawn into what he heard on the CD, music that spoke to him and propelled him to write lyrics. Wanting to know who wrote this music, Forbes confessed that he stole a CD. Forbes discovered that it was a 15-year-old named Jake Bass, whose father was one-half of the Bass Brothers. A meeting was set up and Forbes played him demos of what he wrote and Bass was interested. Forbes then gave him a tape that he had been writing to that just had Forbes rapping on it and asked Bass if he could write music on top of it. A few days later, Bass delivered what would turn out to be the first song that they wrote together called "I'm Deaf" a play on words and what Forbes felt was an introduction song to who he was and what he stood for, poking fun at himself throughout the song.

During this time Forbes was traveling the country going to deaf-related events sharing the D-PAN videos with audiences and making a name for himself. During this time he took the opportunity to perform material that he and Bass were working on. Adrean Mangiardi, who had helped Forbes create a video to show Eminem which helped form D-PAN, had kept in touch over the years. Forbes asked Mangiardi to come to Detroit and create a music video. Working together for the first time since college, they instantly bonded again and Mangiardi proceeded to film Forbes performing "I'm Deaf". While editing the video together, the batteries on Mangiardi's cochlear implant battery died leaving him unable to understand what Forbes was doing in the video. Upon realizing this, Mangiardi decided to implement words in a phonetic style into the video thus making the video even more accessible for those who may not know sign language.

Forbes' partner in D-PAN, Joel Martin, had no idea that Forbes was writing his own material. Mangiardi and Forbes showed Martin the video for "I'm Deaf" and instantly signed him to Web Entertainment and released a two-song EP called "I'm Deaf / Let's Mambo" in physical format and on ITunes.

When the video was released it was an instant viral hit with the Deaf community. Forbes was one of the first deaf artists to vocally rap and sign his own songs at the same time. While on a PR tour for the music video Forbes was on NPR Weekend Edition with Liane Hansen when he spoke about wanting to do another music video for a song he had called "Let's Mambo" which was the B-side to the single "I'm Deaf" that talks about his girlfriend wanting him to dance, and how he can't. Forbes mentioned that he wanted to do the music video with a certain Deaf actress who was featured on Dancing with the Stars. Not mentioning her name, many people knew immediately whom Forbes was talking about, academy award-winning actress Marlee Matlin.

It just so happened that Matlin's long-time interpreter and business partner Jack Jason was listening to the Weekend Edition and told Matlin about what Forbes had said. Matlin instantly reached out to Forbes on Twitter asking if he was interested in doing a music video with her for his song. Upon working on this music video, Forbes and Matlin instantly hit it off and their chemistry was evident in the music video which featured dancing from many popular dancers in the Detroit music scene and was choreographed by Matlin's Dancing with the Stars partner Fabian Sanchez

=== Perfect Imperfection (2012) ===
On September 4, 2012, Forbes released his full-length debut album Perfect Imperfection on Web Entertainment. The CD and DVD album that was a first of its kind. "I always wanted to make my music accessible to everyone," Forbes said "and with this album, that was my goal". Featuring 13 songs that album was produced by Sean's longtime partner Jake Bass, with Forbes writing all of the lyrics for the album. The DVD features music videos for all the songs making the album accessible to both hearing and Deaf audiences.

Forbes went on tour in support of the record and toured the world to promote the record, and played in front of over 50,000 people across North America. In addition to touring the United States and Canada, his travels also included trips to Israel, Norway, England, Australia, New Zealand, France. played in front of over 50,000 people across North America. The performances feature Sean's longtime producer Jake Bass and his longtime friend Mark Levin. Adrean Mangiardi, Forbes' visual partner created videos for the performance so that audiences could watch Forbes and also see the lyrics behind him creating a multi-media performance that could be enjoyed by all. Perfect Imperfection was well received by the Detroit music community and enabled Forbes to draw large audiences across the country. His music videos were also featured on MTV and he has garnered articles in Vibe, XXL, Spin, and more.

Forbes released a music video for "Watch These Hands" on July 30, 2013. The song was inspired by Forbes' background and the journey that he took to get to where he is today. It was well received. Forbes was also featured on a TV show called "Motor City Rising" on Ovation TV following him around for weeks and documenting his journey. Sean Forbes went on a 2-week tour of Israel playing performances in Tel Aviv, Jerusalem, and Bethlehem to rave reviews with his band. Forbes penned the ending credits song for the film "No Ordinary Hero: The SuperDeafy Story" with a song also titled "No Ordinary Hero".

=== 2015 – 2018 ===
Wanting to re-focus D-PAN, in 2015 Forbes co-founded DPAN.TV The Sign Language Channel to make news and media accessible for the Deaf and Hard-of-Hearing community by producing content with sign language, voiceovers, and captions. In 2016 DPAN.TV made history by producing an accessible broadcast of the presidential debates with sign language interpreters on the screen, viewed by over half a million across the country. The goal for DPAN.TV is to be a central location for high-quality sign language video content.

In April 2017, Forbes released a new song and music video titled "Two Blown Speakers" with long-time producer [Jake Bass]. This marks the first time Forbes had released any new music since 2012's Perfect Imperfection.

On December 16, 2018, Forbes organized and co-produced The Deaf And Loud Symphonic Experience in Detroit featuring Evelyn Glennie, Mandy Harvey and The Detroit Symphony Orchestra to a sold-out crowd at Orchestra Hall. The performance featured original songs by Forbes and Jake Bass, covers of popular Detroit songs including several Motown hits and featuring Motown musicians Martha Reeves, Dennis Coffey, with arrangements from Motown arranger Paul Riser. The performance received rave reviews by Billboard. Forbes has mentioned on social media that there are talks to do more shows around the country.

=== 2020 – Present: Little Victories, Super Bowl ===
On February 21, 2020, Forbes released a new album called Little Victories. He threw a party at Third Man Record's Cass Corridor location to celebrate the release. The album also reached number one on several music charts alongside fellow Detroit rappers Eminem & Royce Da 5'9"

On February 13, 2022, Forbes and fellow Deaf rapper Warren "WAWA" Snipe performed sign-language interpretations of the headliners' music in the Super Bowl LVI halftime show. This was the first time that sign-language performances have been incorporated into NFL's halftime program.

On November 17, 2022, Forbes released a Super Deluxe version of Little Victories including 6 previously unreleased songs.

In April 2023, Forbes took home the 2023 Outstanding Rap Artist of the Year and 2023 Outstanding Rap Recording for "Little Victories" Super Deluxe at the 2023 Detroit Music Awards.

Forbes and D-PAN produced American Sign Language music access for Metallica's new album "72 Seasons" alongside American Sign Language music interpreter Amber Galloway.

In May 2023, Forbes was featured in a Google-produced video focused on finger-spelling recognition for American Sign Language which also features him performing revised lyrics from his popular song "Watch These Hands" and spoke about the exciting times ahead for Artificial Intelligence and Sign Language

== Awards ==
- 2013 Outstanding Hip-Hop Artist/Group (Detroit Music Awards)
- 2018 Outstanding Rap Composer (Detroit Music Awards)
- 2019 Outstanding Rap MC (Detroit Music Awards).
- 2023 Outstanding Rap Artist (Detroit Music Awards)
- 2023 Outstanding Rap Recording (Detroit Music Awards)

== Discography ==
=== Albums ===
- Perfect Imperfection (2012; Web Entertainment/D-PAN Entertainment)
- Little Victories (2020; Two Blown Speakers, LLC)
