= Midnight Cabaret =

1990 film

- VHS cover
- Directed by: Pece Dingo
- Screenplay by: Pece Dingo; Lori Gloede
- Story by: Paul Fries; Temístocles López
- Produced by: Niki Marvin; Susan Moses
- Starring: Laura Harrington; Michael Des Barres
- Cinematography: Bernd Heinl
- Edited by: Robert Gordon
- Music by: Michel Colombier
- Production companies: Lorimar Film Entertainment; Niki Marvin Productions
- Distributed by: Warner Home Video
- Release date: 26 November 1990
- Running time: 94 minutes
- Country: United States
- Language: English

Midnight Cabaret is a 1990 direct-to-video surrealist horror film. Directed by Macedonian filmmaker Pece Dingo, it stars Lisa Hart Carroll, Michael Des Barres, Paul Drake, Laura Harrington, Thom Mathews, Carolyn Seymour, Leonard Termo, Norbert Weisser, and Bruce Wright. It was released by Warner Home Video.

== Premise ==
The events depicted in a New York theatre show become a disturbing reality when one of its stars is found murdered, with police directing their attention to the production's leading lady, who appears to have fallen under the spell of a cult of Satanists.

== Cast ==
- Lisa Hart Carroll as Dawn
- Michael Des Barres as Paul Van Dyke
- Paul Drake as Intruder
- Laura Harrington as Tanya Richards
- Thom Mathews as David
- Carolyn Seymour as Orion
- Leonard Termo as Lt. McMurphy
- Norbert Weisser as Tony
- Bruce Wright as Det. Angelo

== Release ==
Midnight Cabaret was initially intended for release in 1988 and received an MPA rating that same year, but was not released until late 1990 as a DTV title through Warner Home Video. Some sources list the date as November 26, 1990, while others state that it released on December 9 that year.

== Reception ==
Critical reception was mixed, with The Expositor praising the mix of dream logic and reality while criticizing the acting and dialogue. Believing it to be "moody" rather than outright scary, TV Guide called Cabaret a "handsomely mounted film [...] a must-see for horror fans in search of outré kicks". Variety praised the acting of Michael Des Barres while stating that Bruce Wright delivered the film's worst performance.
