= The Adult Net =

UK musical group

- Origin: United Kingdom
- Genres: Indie pop
- Years active: 1984–1990
- Labels: Beggars Banquet (1985–1986); Fontana (1989–1990)
- Spinoff of: The Fall
- Past members: Brix Smith; Simon Rogers; Craig Scanlon; Karl Burns; Clem Burke; James Eller; Craig Gannon; Andy Rourke; Mike Joyce

The Adult Net were a British indie pop band formed by British-based American singer and guitarist Brix Smith in 1984, while she was a member of the Fall.

The group were initially assisted by several members of the Fall, including Simon Rogers, Craig Scanlon and Karl Burns. The group issued four singles in 1985/86; Scanlon ceased playing after the debut single, and Burns left a single later. In 1988, the Smith/Rogers duo recruited former Smiths members Craig Gannon, Andy Rourke and Mike Joyce to fill in the line-up, but by the time the group recorded their only album in 1989, Rogers, Rourke and Joyce had all left. The final Adult Net line-up was a quartet of Smith, Gannon, former Blondie member Clem Burke and the The member James Eller. After the band's 1989 debut album The Honey Tangle failed to chart, their label Fontana Records released them from their contract in 1990, and the group disbanded.

== History ==
=== Formation ===
American singer and guitarist Brix Smith joined the British post-punk band the Fall in 1983 and later married the band's founder, Mark E. Smith. While remaining with the Fall, Smith formed the Adult Net along with fellow Fall member Simon Rogers in late 1984, and they released a cover version of American psychedelic rock band Strawberry Alarm Clock's 1967 hit single, "Incense and Peppermints", on Beggars Banquet in April 1985. At the time, the official band line-up was credited as Brix on vocals and guitar, Ottersley Kipling (i.e., Simon Rogers) on bass, Silki Guth (a.k.a. Craig Scanlon) on guitar, and 'Mask' Aiechmann (a.k.a. Karl Burns) on drums. This meant that the official Adult Net line-up was essentially the Fall without Mark E. Smith, although Smith did appear as a guest on a few Adult Net recordings credited as 'Count Gunther Hoalingen'. Also, producer John Leckie was credited as Swami Anand Nagara, a pseudonym he would also use for his production work with psychedelic revivalists the Dukes of Stratosphear, who released their debut single the same month as the Adult Net debuted, being April 1985.

"Edie" – a tribute to Edie Sedgwick, the American actress and one of Andy Warhol's superstars – was released in November 1985, with the line-up down to a trio of Brix, Kipling and Aiechmann. (For the first few years of the band's existence, Brix Smith was billed simply as "Brix", although in the writing credits she used the name "Brix E. Smith".)

Two singles were released in 1986, "White Night (Stars Say Go)", a cover version of "White Night" by English band the Lines, and "Waking Up in the Sun". "Waking Up in the Sun" was the first single by the band to chart when it reached number 94 on the UK Singles Chart in September 1986. For both 1986 singles, the group were officially credited as being simply 'Brix' and 'O. Kipling'. An album was recorded for Beggars Banquet in 1987 called Spin This Web but remains unreleased.

=== Fontana Records ===
In an attempt to sign with Geffen Records, in 1988 Smith and Rogers recruited former Smiths members Craig Gannon (guitar), Andy Rourke (bass) and Mike Joyce (drums) to the Adult Net. Around this same time, Rogers dropped the "O. Kipling" stage name, and Brix added the last name Smith to her official billing. However, this line-up did not issue any material, and Rogers, Rourke and Joyce all left the band after only a few months together.

The Adult Net were eventually signed by Phonogram subsidiary Fontana Records, with a somewhat revised line-up – Smith and Gannon were joined by James Eller on bass, and former Blondie drummer Clem Burke. This quartet recorded the 1989 album The Honey Tangle. The album was recorded at The Church Studios in London and produced by Craig Leon. Three singles were released from the album: "Take Me", which reached number 78; "Where Were You" (a cover version of American rock band the Grass Roots' 1966 single "Where Were You When I Needed You"), which reached number 66; and a re-recorded version of "Waking Up in the Sun", which reached number 99. Shortly after the release of the album, Smith left the Fall, having ended her marriage with Mark E. in early 1989. The album failed to chart and the band were released by Fontana in October 1990, dissolving shortly thereafter.

== Musical style ==
In his 1987 interview with Brix Smith, Richard Cook for Sounds, described The Adult Net's debut single as psychedelic revival and noted that Smith "seems captivated by the innocent spirit of an older sort of pop". The American music journalist Ira Robbins described the band's music as "a flower-powery side project to the Fall". He noted that some songs took "a pointless country turn" but that The Honey Tangle was a "catchy power-folk-pop collection that sounds like a flashback to 1981 Los Angeles". While reviewing The Honey Tangle for Allmusic, Stewart Mason said that the band's early singles were "spiky marriages between guitars and electronics that owed much to the raincoat-clad heyday of Factory Records". Stewart went on to describe The Honey Tangle as "glossy, jangly, sweet-natured pop music that would sound perfectly at home in the Top 40 radio play lists of some alternate universe".

== Discography ==
=== Albums ===
- The Honey Tangle (1989)

=== Singles ===
- "Incense and Peppermints" (1985)
- "Edie" (1985)
- "White Nights (Stars Say Go)" (1986)
- "Waking Up in the Sun" (1986) UK No. 94
- "Take Me" (1989) UK No. 78
- "Where Were You" (1989) UK No. 66
- "Waking Up in the Sun" (1989) UK No. 99
