= Infinite (Eminem album) =

1996 studio album by Eminem

- Original cassette release artwork

Studio album by Eminem
- Released: November 12, 1996
- Recorded: 1995 – 1996
- Studios: Bassment Studios (Ferndale, MI)
- Genres: Boom bap; hardcore hip-hop
- Length: 37:54
- Label: WEB
- Producers: Bass Brothers (exec.); Denaun Porter; Eminem

Eminem chronology
Infinite (1996)	Slim Shady EP (1997)

Infinite is the debut studio album by the American rapper Eminem. It was released through WEB Entertainment on November 12, 1996. Recording sessions took place at Bassment Studios in Ferndale between 1995 and 1996. The production on the album handled by Denaun Porter, with Eminem being involved in two tracks. The album features guest vocals from Eye-Kyu, Mr. Porter, Three, Thyme, and Angel Workman, as well as an uncredited appearance from rapper Proof.

Prior to the release of Infinite, Eminem developed his lyricism as a rapper in the Detroit hip-hop scene, having been a member of the rap group Soul Intent. In 1995, music producer Mark Bass heard an open mic performance from Eminem on WJLB-FM in Detroit, which led the latter to be signed to then-recently founded record label WEB Entertainment. A boom bap and hardcore hip-hop album, Infinite emphasizes Eminem's struggles with financial instability and raising his daughter, as well as his hopes of becoming a successful rapper.

Only pressed with five hundred copies on vinyl and cassette, Infinite was released to Detroit-based stores and radio programmers, but failed commercially and critically. Eminem recalled the negative feedback he received on the album, particularly for being a white rapper and sounding resemblant of Nas and AZ. Shortly after the release of Infinite, Eminem began using darker and nihilistic themes in his lyrics, starting with Slim Shady EP (1997). The EP led to him being discovered by Dr. Dre and eventually being signed to Aftermath and Interscope Records. There, he released The Slim Shady LP (1999), which marks his breakthrough album.

Retrospectively, Infinite has received mixed-to-positive reviews from music critics, with many emphasizing its historic appeal and stating that Eminem's style wasn't developed yet at the time. Some critics complimented the album's lyricism and production. In 2009, thisis50.com re-released the album for free download in anticipation of Eminem's sixth studio album, Relapse (2009). In 2016, a short documentary based on Infinite was released alongside the self-titled track digitally. In 2026, the album was released through Org Music as the six-track EP, Infinite 30. to digital streaming providers, alongside another short documentary. Commercially, Infinite EP peaked at number 15 and number 19 on the UK Album Downloads and UK R&B Albums charts, respectively.

== Background and recording ==
In the past several years before recording Infinite, Eminem consistently developed his lyricism as a local rapper in Detroit, having been a member of the rap group Soul Intent. At the time, Eminem lived with his mother in Detroit and held a minimum-wage job at Gilbert's Lodge in St. Clair Shores, where he washed dishes and cooked. After his shift, he would write rhymes until the early morning, developing a distinct rapping skill with intricate vocabulary and an "even-flowing style".

In 1995, music producer Mark Bass heard Eminem's open mic performance on WJLB-FM in Detroit, which led the former to get interested in communicating with him. At approximately 4 am the following day, a group entered his recording studio, which included Eminem. The latter began writing songs for Infinite around the time his girlfriend, Kim Scott, was pregnant and gave birth to their daughter, Hailie Jade Scott, on Christmas in 1995. Infinite was recorded at the Bass Brothers' studio Bassment Studios in Ferndale, Michigan, in 1996, although according to his autobiography, The Way I Am (2008), he recalled that it was recorded in 1995. Mr. Porter produced the majority of the album, while Proof programmed the drums.

== Music and lyrics ==
"Infinite"
"Infinite" highlights Eminem's wordplay with a boom bap style.

Infinite is a boom bap and hardcore hip-hop album built on "dusty loops" and a "lo-fi aesthetic". Lyrically, the album is based on Eminem's struggles with raising his baby daughter, his hope for financial stability, and becoming a successful rapper. The album also emphasizes Eminem's wise of wordplay, and features guest appearances from Eye-Kyu, Mr. Porter, Three, Thyme, and Angel Workman, as well as an uncredited appearance from Proof. Infinite begins with its self-titled track. Reliant on a "simple piano riff" and "standard snare beat", Eminem emphasizes his rhyme scheme in a way "unfathomable". He then describes himself as "serving a sentence in hell for murdering musical instruments", hence being his reason for being unable to achieve success.

On the more accessible "It's O.K.", Eminem raps about how he remains optimistic despite living roughly in Detroit. In addition, he describes finding his solace in Christianity through God. "Never 2 Far" begins with Eminem having a conversation with a friend as a bus stop, of which they talk about their financial difficulties and ambitions. It follows by Eminem rapping about staying inspired and making accomplishments for his family to become financially stable. Infinite also explores romantic themes. On "Searchin'", Eminem raps tenderly about "snuggling", "kissing", and "hugging" a lover. "Jealousy Woes II" details personal problems Eminem has with a woman "who mistreats him despite how hard he tries to impress her."

== Release and legacy ==
The critical and commercial failure of Infinite led Eminem (pictured in 1999) to incorporate darker themes into his work.

To release Infinite, the Bass Brothers borrowed $1,500 from their mother to press five hundred copies of Infinite, signing Eminem to their then-recently founded record label WEB Entertainment. Eminem hoped for Infinite to get played on Detroit radio stations. On November 12, 1996, Infinite was released by WEB on vinyl and cassette to local stores in Detroit and hip-hop radio programmers, but became a commercial and critical failure. Despite the little attention that the album received, local DJs played "Tonite" mainly for its "club feel" in contrast to the "underground and hardcore" style of Infinite.

Eminem recalled the negative feedback he received on the album, with one considering him to sound too similar to Nas and AZ, and another dismissing Infinite because of his race in hip-hop. It is not known exactly how many copies Infinite sold. Eminem stated in his autobiography The Way I Am (2008) that it sold "maybe 70 copies". However, Rolling Stone stated that the album sold a few hundred copies. Reflecting on Infinite, Eminem considered it to not be a "good album", particularly for its lack of humor compared to his later albums.

=== Aftermath ===
Shortly after the album's release and prior to Christmas in 1996, Eminem was fired by Gilbert's Lodge, experienced financial difficulties with taking care of Hailie, fought with Kim, and attempted suicide. Around this time, Eminem became a prominent rapper at the Hip-Hop Shop in Detroit, where he participated in battle rap competitions and won them consistently. Distancing from his style on Infinite, Eminem began using darker and nihilistic themes in his lyrics, which led to the conception of Slim Shady EP (1997).

Eminem participated on the Rap Olympics, where he was defeated to Chicago-based rapper J.U.I.C.E. and another rapper Other-Wize. Two Interscope Records assistants received a demo tape from Eminem, later giving it to Jimmy Iovine and Dr. Dre. The demo led Dr. Dre to sign him to Aftermath Entertainment, of which Eminem recorded The Slim Shady LP (1999) and served as his breakthrough album. Original pressings of Infinite became more valuable following Eminem's fame, with some copies being sold for thousands of dollars.

=== Subsequent re-releases ===
On May 14, 2009, thisis50.com re-released the album for free download on their website to build anticipation for Eminem's sixth studio album, Relapse (2009), which was his comeback album. On November 17, 2016, in honor of its 20th anniversary, 8 Mile Style released the short documentary. Partners In Rhyme: The True Story of Infinite, which used archival footage and interviews to detail the album's production. The following day, Eminem digitally released a remixed and remastered version of the self-titled track, "Infinite".

On November 12, 2026, Infinite was re-released as a six-track EP to digital streaming providers in commencement of its 30th anniversary. Released in partnership with Org Music, the EP was remixed by and featured newer production from Bass, as well as Mike "Slim" Wilder. In addition, the ten-minute documentary, Infinite 30, was released on YouTube. Commercially, Infinite EP peaked at number 15 and number 19 on the UK Album Downloads and UK R&B Albums charts on the week ending November 20, respectively. The EP is set to be released on cassette and CD on February 26, 2027. Vinyl pressings include "purple stardust", "ultra violet", "nebula hand-pour", and "galactic blue". Eminem was not involved on the EP's release.

== Critical reception ==
Professional ratings
Review scores
Source	Rating
AllMusic	2.5/5 stars
RapReviews	5.5/10

Retrospective reviews of Infinite from music critics were mixed-to-positive. AllMusic gave it an "Editor Score" of 2.5 out of 5 stars, without a review. Jesal Padania of RapReviews was more critical on the album, stating that its tracks feel more like "extended demo[s]" that display "little real emotion" compared to Eminem's later work. Rob Kenner of Complex ranked Infinite as the 16th best Eminem project. While he considered Eminem's style to not have been developed yet and that his delivery lacked urgency, he still viewed the album as a "competent but unremarkable effort".

In a more positive review, Tedd Maider of Consequence of Sound describes Infinite as "a more genuine glimpse of the rapper that is Eminem", and commented that it is "quick-witted and unique rhyming", "lyrical chops, raw style beats, and mentality" could only be matched by his third studio album The Marshall Mathers LP (2000). Ranking Eminem's ten studio albums for Stereogum in 2019, Christopher R. Weingarten placed Infinite on eight place. He described it as sounding similar to other lyrical hip-hop artists of the time, including D.I.T.C., Boot Camp Clik, Chino XL, and Akinyele. Weingarten concluded that the album serves as a "lo-fi document of a remarkable underground MC before he had his pop sensibility ironed out."

In XXL magazine's 2021 ranking of Eminem's 11 studio albums, Kemet High placed Infinite eighth, highlighting "313" and "Tonite" as highlights while seeing his style as emulative of other hip-hop artists. In a 2024 ranking of Eminem's twelve studio albums, Damien Scott of Billboard placed Infinite on tenth place. He considered the album to sound similar to other hip-hop release of the time, comparing the self-titled track or "313" to the style of Masta Ace and AZ. Scott concluded the review by stating that it "gives great insight into the raw materials" that created Slim Shady.

== Track listing ==
Track listing and credits taken from album booklet.

Infinite track listing
No.	Title	Writer(s)	Producer(s)	Length
1.	"Infinite"	Marshall Mathers; Denaun Porter		4:11
2.	"W.E.G.O. (Interlude)"			0:26
3.	"It's O.K." (featuring Eye-Kyu)	Mathers; Willie Drake; Porter		3:29
4.	"Tonite"	Mathers; Porter		3:45
5.	"313" (featuring Eye-Kyu)	Mathers; Drake; Porter		4:11
6.	"Maxine" (featuring Denaun Porter and Three)	Mathers; Porter	Porter; Eminem^{[a]}	3:55
7.	"Open Mic" (featuring Thyme)	Mathers; Bernard Russell; Porter		4:02
8.	"Never 2 Far"	Mathers		3:38
9.	"Searchin'" (featuring Eye-Kyu and Angela Workman)	Mathers; Drake; Porter; Angela Workman		3:45
10.	"Backstabber"	Mathers; Porter		3:24
11.	"Jealousy Woes II"	Mathers; Porter	Porter; Eminem^{[a]}	3:19
Total length:				37:54

Infinite EP 30th Anniversary track listing
No.	Title	Writer(s)	Length
1.	"Infinite"	Mathers; Porter	4:11
2.	"It's O.K." (featuring Eye-Kyu)	Mathers; Drake; Porter	3:33
3.	"Tonite"	Mathers; Porter	3:42
4.	"313" (featuring Eye-Kyu)	Mathers; Drake; Porter	4:10
5.	"Open Mic" (featuring Thyme)	Mathers; Russell; Porter	3:53
6.	"Never 2 Far"	Mathers	3:44
Total length:			23:16

Notes

- ^{^[a]} signifies a co-producer

== Personnel ==
Credits are adapted from the album's liner notes.

- Eminem – vocals, production
- Kevin Wilder – mixing, recording
- Robert "Flipside" Handy – mixing, recording
- Mr. Porter – production
- Jeff Bass – executive production
- Mark Bass – executive production
- DJ Buttafingaz – scratches

== Charts ==
Chart performance for Infinite EP
Chart (2026)	Peak position
UK Album Downloads (Official Charts)	15
UK R&B Albums (Official Charts)	19
