= The Chesterfield Kings =

American rock band

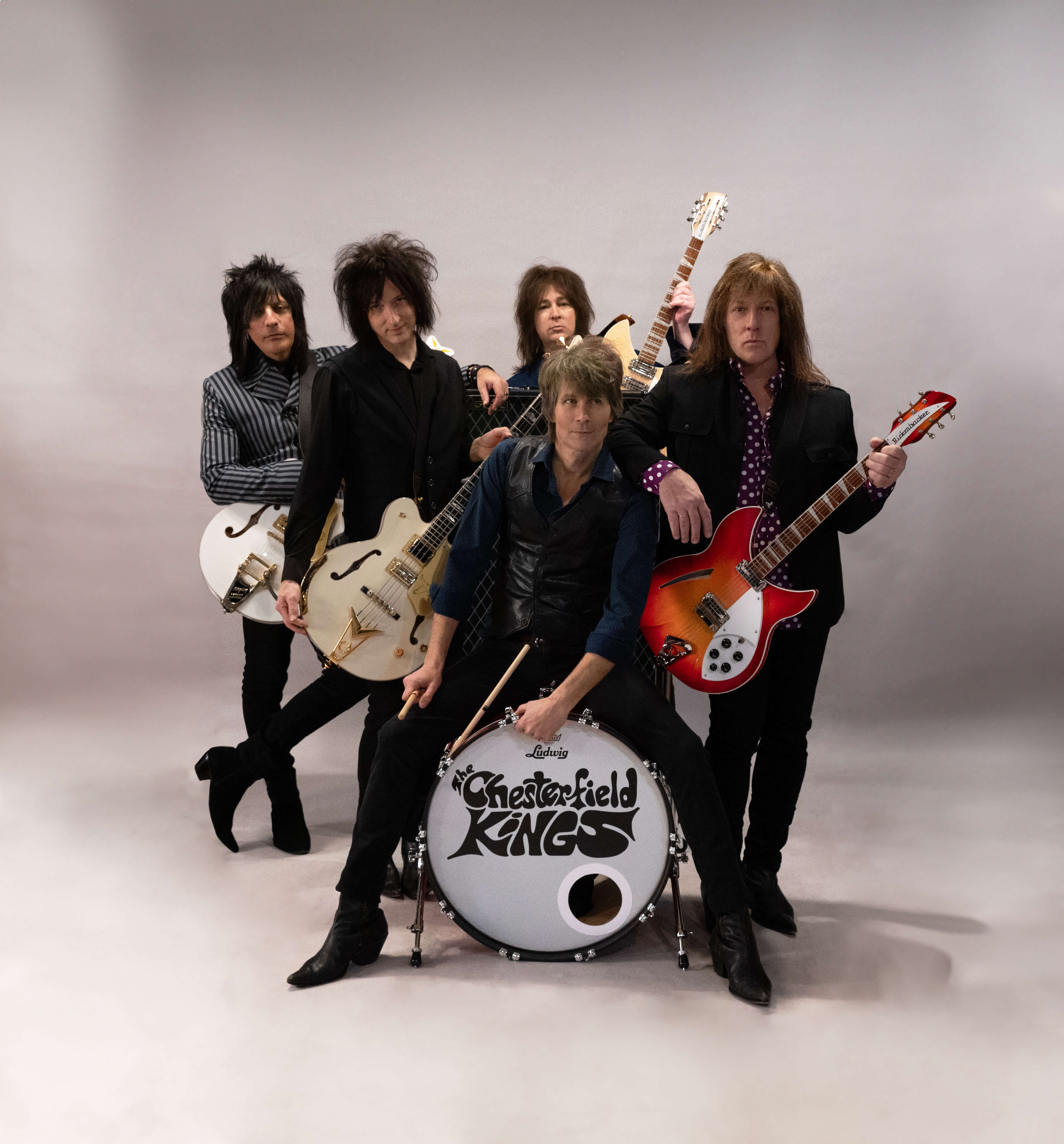

Background information
- Origin: Rochester, New York, United States
- Genres: Garage rock, psychedelic rock
- Years active: 1979–present
- Labels: Sundazed, Mirror, Wicked Cool
- Members: Andy Babiuk; Mike Boise; Jeff Okolowicz; Ted Okolowicz; John Cammarosano
- Past members: Greg Prevost; Paul Morabito; Orest Guran; Richard Cona; Doug Meech; Mike Pappert; Walt O'Brien; Paul Rocco; Brett Reynolds; Kris Hadlock
- Website: https://www.thechesterfieldkings.com/

The cover artwork of The Chesterfield Kings' Let's Go Get Stoned (1994) references the American version of the Rolling Stones' Aftermath (1966); the Mirror Records logo references the London Records logo.

The Chesterfield Kings are a rock band from Rochester, New York, who began as a retro '60s inspired garage band, and evoking the sounds and styles of 1960s psychedelic rock music. The current lineup features longtime members: Andy Babiuk, Mike Boise, Jeff Okolowicz, Ted Okolowicz, and newcomer John Cammarosano. Former singer Greg Prevost left the band in 2009 to pursue a solo career. The band, named after a brand of unfiltered cigarette, was instrumental in sparking the 1980s garage band revival that launched such groups as the Unclaimed, Marshmallow Overcoat, The Fuzztones, The Pandoras, Mystic Eyes, The Cynics, the Secret Service, and the Stomachmouths.

== History ==
The early Kings were a late-1970s recreation of a mid-1960s garage band sound. Their self-released first single was a cover of The Brogues' 1965 "I Ain't No Miracle Worker" b/w The Heard's 1967 "Exit 9". In a deliberate effort to create their own rare garage-band collectible singles, only 100 copies were pressed.

Their first broader public exposure came when a track on Greg Shaw's 1981 Bomp! Records compilation Battle of the Garage netted them a series of dates at the Peppermint Lounge in New York City. They continued with this 1960s garage sound through the mid-1980s, releasing two albums—Here are the Chesterfield Kings (1982) which contained entirely cover songs, and Stop! (1985) which introduced their first originals. They then turned to a harder-edged rock sound for Don't Open Till Doomsday (1987) and Berlin Wall of Sound (1989) featuring the blues guitar work of new band member Paul Rocco. The group's next album was an acoustic blues record Drunk On Muddy Water (1990).

Their Let's Go Get Stoned (1994) was a mix of slightly post-Aftermath Stones covers and originals in the Stones' style. Surfin' Rampage (1997) featured pop harmonies; Where the Action Is (1999) was a return to garage band roots, a mix of covers and 1960s-styled originals.

The Kings' full-length feature film Where is the Chesterfield King? (2000) is described as "A comedy/drama in the vein of The Bowery Boys, Batman, The Monkees Show, A Hard Day's Night, Hawaiian Eye, and The Munsters, with a little Three Stooges slapstick to boot…"

In 2003 the band released The Mindbending Sounds of the Chesterfield Kings which pays tribute to the more baroque side of the 1960s underground, evoking at times the sound of the Electric Prunes ("Transparent Life", "Disconnection"), and featuring appearances by Jorma Kaukonen on two tracks. In 2004 the band briefly appeared performing two songs from the album, "I Don't Understand" and "Mystery Trip", on stage in a rock club scene in the fifth season episode of HBO's The Sopranos, "Irregular Around the Margins".

As the late 2000's arrived the band released Psychedelic Sunrise (2008) which was an extension of sorts of the group's previous "Mindbending Sounds" album. Their next release Got Live…If You Want It (2009) was a dual live recording and DVD set, this was the band's final release before going on hiatus.

In 2009, Prevost left the band and took the solo route releasing a 45 "Mr. Charlie" b/w "Rolling Stone Blues" in 2012, and in 2013 releasing the blues-rock album "Mississippi Murderer".

In 2013 Andy Babiuk formed The Empty Hearts featuring a roster of founding members including Blondie drummer Clem Burke, The Cars guitarist Elliot Easton, and The Romantics guitarist and vocalist Wally Palmar. They released two albums, their self titled debut album The Empty Hearts and it's follow-up The Second Album

In 2024, The Chesterfield Kings returned after a 15 year hiatus, starting off their return with a west coast tour. Four longtime members of the band are carrying its music forward, namely, Andy Babiuk, Mike Boise, Jeff Okolowicz, Ted Okolowicz and newcomer John Cammarosano. They released two brand new singles on Wicked Cool Records "Meet You After Midnight" and "Electrified" which features a cover of the Bob Dylan song "My Back Pages" In the summer of 2024 the band released their third new single "Fly the astral Plane" backed with a cover of The Who's 1966 song "So Sad About Us". On October 11, 2024 they released We're Still All The Same, which was their first new studio album since 2008's Psychedelic Sunrise.

== Line up ==
Current Members

- Andy Babiuk (lead vocals, guitar, multi-instrumentalist 1979–Present)
- Jeff Okolowicz (bass 1995-1999, 2009-2024–Present)
- Ted Okolowicz (guitar 1995-1999, 2024–Present)
- Mike Boise (drums, percussion 1996–Present)
- John Cammarosano (guitar, keys 2024–Present)

Past Members

- Greg Prevost (lead vocals, multi-instrumentalist 1976-2009)
- Richard Cona (lead guitar 1976–c.1987)
- Bob Ames (guitar 1977)
- Steve Larreau (guitar 1977-1978)
- Frank Moll (guitar 1978)
- Orest Guran (organ, guitar, 1979–1986)
- Doug Meech (drummer 1979–c.1988) (Deceased)
- Walt O'Brien (guitar, organ, 1986–1987)
- Brett Reynolds (drums 1989-1994)
- Paul Rocco (guitar 1990-1995) (Deceased)
- Kris Hadlock (drums 1994-1996)
- Paul Morabito (guitar 1999-2009)
- Zachary Koch (rhythm guitar 2007-2009)

Collaborators

- Mark Lindsey (Features on the single "Where Do We Go From Here")
- Mick Taylor (Features on the album "Let's go Get Stoned)
- Sal Valintino (Features on the single "Sometime At Night")
- Jorma Kaukonen (Features on the album "The Mindbending sounds of....")
- Bo Diddley
- Dee Dee Ramone
- Johnny Thunders
- Steven Van Zandt

== Discography ==
=== Albums ===
- (1982) Here are the Chesterfield Kings (Mirror Records)
- (1985) Stop! (Mirror Records)
- (1987) Don't Open Till Doomsday (Mirror Records)
- (1989) Berlin Wall of Sound (Mirror Records)
- (1990) Drunk On Muddy Water (Mirror Records)
- (1994) Let's Go Get Stoned (Mirror Records)
- (1997) Surfin' Rampage (Mirror Records)
- (1999) Where the Action Is (Sundazed)
- (2003) The Mindbending Sounds of… (Living Eye / Sundazed, 2003 Release, Wicked Cool Records 2006 Re-Release)
- (2008) Psychedelic Sunrise (Wicked Cool Records)
- (2009) Live Onstage...If You Want It (Wicked Cool Records)
- (2024) We're Still All The Same (Wicked Cool Records)
- (2025) Loose Ends: 1989–2004 Rare, B-Sides & Unreleased (Wicked Cool Records)

=== Singles ===
- (1979) "I Ain't No Miracle Worker" b/w "Exit 9" (Living Eye Records)
- (1981) "You Can't Catch Me" b/w "I Won't Be There" (Living Eye Records)
- (1982) "Hey Little Bird" b/w "I Can Only Give You Everything" (Living Eye Records)
- (1982) "I'm Going Home" b/w "A Dark Corner" (Mirror Records)
- (1984) "She Told Me Lies" b/w "I've Got a Way With Girls" (Mirror Records)
- (1987) "Baby Doll" b/w "I Cannot Find Her (acoustic version)" (Mirror Records)
- (1991) "Next One In Line" b/w "Talk Talk" and "You Drive Me Nervous" (Mirror Records)
- (1994) "Hey Joe" b/w "Roadrunner" (as "The Paisley Zipper Band" Get Hip Recordings)
- (1997) "Misty Lane" b/w "Little Girl" (Misty Lane records, Italian fanzine release)
- (1998) "Help You Ann" b/w Lyres "She Told Me Lies" (Living Eye Records / Sundazed Music)
- (1998) "Wrong From Right" b/w "So What" (Living Eye Records / Sundazed Music)
- (1998) "Run Rudolph Run" (Living Eye Records fan club Christmas single)
- (1999) "Where Do We Go From Here" b/w "Louie Go Home" (Living Eye/Sundazed Music, vocals by Mark Lindsay of Paul Revere and the Raiders)
- (2000) "She Pays The Rent" b/w Lyres "She Told Me Lies" Feathered Apple Records)
- (2001) "Yes I Understand" b/w "Sometime At Night" (2001, Sundazed Music, vocals by Sal Valentino of The Beau Brummels)
- (2002) Barbara Ann b/w Girl Don’t Tell Me (Living Eye Records / Sundazed Music)
- (2024) "Meet You After Midnight" (Wicked Cool Records)
- (2024) "Electrified" b/w "My Back Pages" (Wicked Cool Records)
- (2024) Fly The Astral Plane b/w So Sad About Us (Wicked Cool Records)
- (2025) Your Strange Love b/w It's Only Love (Wicked Cool Records)

=== EPs ===
- (1997) The Chesterfield Kings Trippin’ Out (Imposible Records Spain)
- (2009) Up And Down EP (Wicked Cool Records)

=== Bootlegs ===
- Johnny Thunders and the Chesterfield Kings
- Fossils
- Kingsize Rock 'n' Roll
- Long Ago, Far Away (Paisley Zipper Band)
- I Think I'm Down b/w I Can Only Give You Everything (2018, Mean Disposition Records recorded in 1978-79)
