= Chequered Past =

British-American rock band (1982–1985)

- Chequered Past in 1984. Left to right: Steve Jones, Clem Burke, Nigel Harrison, Michael Des Barres and Tony Sales.

Background information
- Origin: New York City, U.S. London, England
- Genres: Hard rock
- Years active: 1982–1985
- Label: EMI
- Past members: Michael Des Barres; Clem Burke; Nigel Harrison; Steve Jones; Tony Fox Sales; Frank Infante

Chequered Past was a British-American rock supergroup led by actor/singer Michael Des Barres and featuring members of Blondie, the Sex Pistols and Tin Machine. They formed in 1982 and released one, self-titled, album in 1984 on EMI Records. The group stopped performing when lead singer Des Barres was recruited to replace Robert Palmer in Power Station.

== History ==
The band started in New York City as a cover band, with their first show being at the Peppermint Lounge on September 26, 1982 and the first song they ever performed live was "Vacation" by The Go-Go's. Des Barres described the music as "New York Dolls in a home for senior citizens".

Nigel Harrison (of Blondie) had often collaborated with Michael Des Barres, and when Des Barres toured in 1981 to support his album I'm Only Human, Harrison was part of his touring band. Des Barres first met Sex Pistols guitarist Steve Jones in 1978 at the Sex Pistols' San Francisco show at the Winterland Ballroom. It was Jones' girlfriend who first suggested that Jones and Des Barres form a band, and the initial line-up was rounded out by Harrison and two more members of the recently disbanded Blondie, Clem Burke and Frank Infante. Frank Infante was eventually replaced by Tony Fox Sales.

Chequered Past opened for various well known acts, including Ratt, Little Steven, INXS and Duran Duran. Duran Duran had opened for Blondie on an earlier tour, so they returned the favor by inviting Chequered Past to open for them on an arena date. This association led Andy Taylor to later invite Des Barres to join Power Station when Robert Palmer left, which ultimately led to the end of Chequered Past.

== Reception ==
- "Unfortunately, Chequered Past turned out to be another group that sounded more interesting on paper than they did in the grooves. It's odd to hear a bunch of ex-punks behaving like presentable mainstream rock entertainers." (Rarebird's Detective Reviews)
- "Their music is their passion. Drumbeats so precise they jumpstart the heart, and aggressive guitar riffs that accelerate the pulse, played by five dynamic personalities that form the mutual admiration society of Chequered Past." (Julia Masi, FFanzeen Magazine)
- "Breeding tells, right? So cross Steve Jones (ex-Pistol), Tony Sales (ex-Ig), Nigel Harrison (ex-Blondie), and Clem Burke (ditto), each sired by a great band, and what do you get? Fast heavy metal, of course, a little too classy for satanism or even blatant sexism, but who cares when what we get from the Nietzsche Sales reads on the cover is "Only the Strong (Will Survive)" in "A World Gone Wild." The secret, as in most bands great and ghastly, is the man with the concept: singer and songwriter Michael Des Barres (ex-Silverhead), whose "daddy was an aristocrat," and who's been ruining rock and roll in a vain attempt to prove that that makes him special for close to a decade. Breeding tells. C−" (Robert Christgau)
- "Although listening to this run-of-the-mill Bad Company arena rock may not, a glance at the credits indicates why Chequered Past was one of the most depressing groups/albums of recent years. Clem Burke and Nigel Harrison (both ex-Blondie) and Steve Jones (ex-Pistols) formed three-fifths of the band, proving conclusively that even talented new wavers, no matter how idealistic and rebellious, were merely a few years away from becoming just as bogus as the musicians they originally set out to dethrone." (Ira Robbins, Trouser Press)
- "A lot of what is here does rock, but things never catch fire the way they ought to." (James Chrispell, Allmusic)

== Members ==
- Michael Des Barres – vocals (Detective, Silverhead)
- Steve Jones – guitar (Sex Pistols)
- Frank Infante – guitar (Blondie)
- Clem Burke – drums (Blondie)
- Nigel Harrison – bass (Blondie)
- Tony Fox Sales – guitar (Iggy Pop, eventually Tin Machine)

== Discography ==
=== Studio albums ===
- Chequered Past (1984)

=== Singles ===
- "How Much Is too Much?" (1984)
