= Deaf Professional Arts Network =

U.S. nonprofit organization

(D-PAN), is a 501(c)(3) national nonprofit organization based in Detroit, Michigan, founded by Sean Forbes and Joel Martin D-PAN creates music videos featuring deaf and hard-of-hearing performers. D-PAN is dedicated to promoting professional development and access to the entertainment, visual and media arts fields for individuals who are deaf or hard of hearing. Their first video for "Where'd You Go" by Fort Minor, with Sean Forbes and Rosina Switras, got hundreds of thousands of views on YouTube. On October 28, 2011, D-PAN released their first new ASL music video in a couple years, "We're Going to be Friends" by the White Stripes. After an announcement on the White Stripes Facebook page, the video went viral, making the front page of Reddit, appearing on CBS News and was briefly shown and mentioned on the Today show on November 3, 2011.

The D-PAN staff consists of Joel Martin (co-founder), Scott Guy (executive director), Sean Forbes (co-founder and chief creative officer), Adrean Mangiardi (director of film) and Mark Levin (Tour, Event, Merchandise and Social Media Manager).

The D-PAN DVD compilation called It's Everybody's Music, volume 1 sold more than 10,000 copies. It includes:

- John Mayer's "Waiting on the World to Change"
- Christina Aguilera's "Beautiful"
- Eminem's "Lose Yourself" performed by Sponge
- Mini – Documentary "Signing Songs: Making of D-PAN Music Videos"
- And more music videos from community performers.

D-PAN also produced a DVD titled Wee Hands Vol.1.

In 2013 D-PAN released a DVD of their popular series It's Everybody's Music Volume Two, it includes:

- The White Stripes "We're Going to Be Friends"
- Owl City "Fireflies"
- Sean Forbes "Watch These Hands"
- The Clark Sisters "You Bought The Sunshine"
- Carly Rae Jepsen "Call Me Maybe"
- Rosa Lee & Damon Timm "Parents, Nothing More"
- 4 Behind the Scene Documentaries of the making of each video
