= Michael Des Barres =

British actor and singer (born 1948)

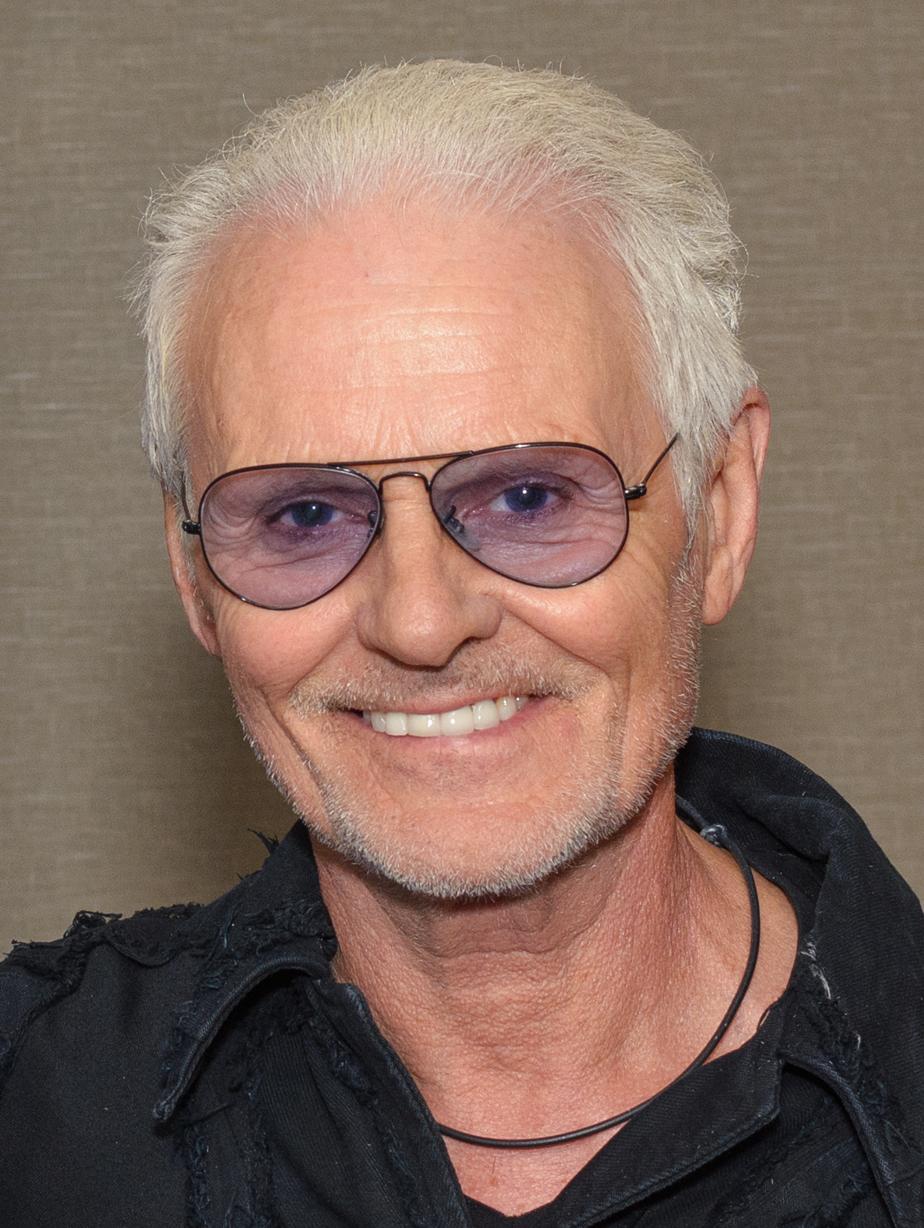
- Des Barres in 2017

Background information
- Born: Michael Phillips Des Barres; 24 January 1948 (age 78); Hove, Sussex, England
- Origin: London, England
- Genres: Rock; jazz; funk; glam rock
- Occupations: Actor; singer
- Years active: 1960–present

Michael Philip Des Barres, 26th Marquis Des Barres, (born 24 January 1948) is an English actor and rock singer. He appeared as Murdoc in the original MacGyver, Lenny Stoke in Lois & Clark: The New Adventures of Superman, and Murdoc's mentor Nicholas Helman in MacGyver (2016). He replaced Robert Palmer in the band The Power Station, fronting the band at the 1985 Live Aid concert.

== Early life ==
The only child of Philip and Irene Des Barres (Marquis and Marquise Des Barres), Michael Philip Des Barres was born and brought up in Hove, Sussex. He attended Repton School, a boarding school in Derbyshire, and went on to attend the Corona Academy drama school in London and appeared in several plays. He has some French ancestry. His title of Marquis was bestowed upon a 13th-century ancestor Guillaume II Des Barres, a French knight, after rescuing King Philip II of France during the Battle of Bouvines in 1214.

== Career ==
=== Music ===
Des Barres started his musical career in the glam rock band Silverhead in England in 1972. The group released two albums on Deep Purple's record label Purple Records before breaking up in 1974.

After leaving Silverhead, Des Barres moved to Los Angeles, where he formed the band Detective. The band was signed to Led Zeppelin's Swan Song Records label by Jimmy Page, whom Des Barres had met after a Silverhead performance in Birmingham, England, that the members of Led Zeppelin had attended.

Following the break-up of Detective in 1978, Des Barres formed Chequered Past in 1982. In 1983 he co-wrote and recorded the song "Obsession" with Holly Knight. In 1985, the band Animotion had an international hit with their cover version.

Des Barres met the members of Duran Duran when Chequered Past opened for a few shows during their 1984 tour. In 1985, when Robert Palmer withdrew from the Duran Duran side project The Power Station just before their American summer tour, Des Barres was chosen to take his place as lead vocalist.

On 5 November 2013, the Michael Des Barres Band released a live album, Hot n Sticky Live, which was recorded at the Viper Room in Los Angeles in November 2012.

On 7 April 2015, Des Barres released a solo album, The Key to the Universe. Produced by Bob Rose at The Forum Music Village in Rome, the album reunited Des Barres with Nigel Harrison (former bassist of Blondie and Silverhead) on bass and guitar, with Clive Deamer (Radiohead, Portishead, Robert Plant) on drums, and Dani Robinson on guitar.

In 2018, he formed the Mistakes, consisting of veteran musicians Loren Molinare (founding member of Little Caesar & the Dogs) on guitar, Eric Himel (Powerman 5000, host of the Sunset Jam) on guitar, Paul Ill (LA-based musician with sales of over 20 million records as a studio musician and 4.5 million records as a songwriter) on bass guitar, and Matt Starr (studio and touring drummer with Guns N' Roses, Ace Frehley, Bon Jovi, and Whitesnake) on drums. The band is signed to Steven Van Zandt's Wicked Cool Records and has released 4 songs: "Living in the USA"/"Gotta Serve Somebody" (1/19/18) and "Crackle and Hiss"/"Stop in the Name of Love" (7/5/19). The Mistakes' plans to tour Japan and Russia in 2020 were cancelled because of the worldwide COVID-19 pandemic.

=== Acting ===
Des Barres has appeared in over 100 different TV shows and almost 30 movies in his career. He first started acting at 8 years old as the Nux Bar kid on posters all over England. He appeared (uncredited) in the 1966 film starring Tony Curtis, Drop Dead Darling. His first credited film role was as a supporting cast member in the classic 1967 film To Sir, with Love, playing an East End pupil who always wears dark sunglasses indoors and out, followed by a few other minor roles before he decided to pursue a career in music instead. He later concentrated his energies on acting again and was cast in Ghoulies (1985) as cult leader Malcolm Graves, and Nightflyers (1987) as a charismatic empath. He worked opposite Clint Eastwood in 1989's Pink Cadillac. His other film roles have included Midnight Cabaret (1990), Under Siege (1992), Waxwork II: Lost in Time (1992), A Simple Twist of Fate (1994), and Sugar Town (1999). He also appeared in the 2004 film Catch That Kid and had a brief part in David Lynch's 2001 film Mulholland Drive.

On television, besides the role of Murdoc in MacGyver, Des Barres was also a lead cast member of The New WKRP in Cincinnati during the 1991–1992 season, as part of a husband-and-wife morning team. He had previously appeared on the original WKRP in Cincinnati as the lead singer of a punk band, Scum of the Earth. On Roseanne he portrayed Leon's boyfriend as well as appearing as one of Darlene's baby's doctors on one of the final episodes of the series. He played the fiendish devil Arthur Field on Melrose Place. Some of his dozens of television appearances include Seinfeld; Renegade; ALF; Ellen; Nip/Tuck; Just Shoot Me!; Hart to Hart; My Sister Sam; Lois & Clark: The New Adventures of Superman; JAG; Nash Bridges; Northern Exposure; The Rockford Files; Sledge Hammer!; Sliders; St. Elsewhere; 21 Jump Street; The Pretender; Dead Like Me; Frasier; Hawaii; Bones; and NCIS.

On 23 October 2013, Des Barres joined the Los Angeles Philharmonic for the world premiere of 200 Motels: The Suites, by Frank Zappa, in which he appeared as Rance, the narrator.

=== Radio ===
Des Barres hosts "The Michael Des Barres Program" on Little Steven's Underground Garage (SiriusXM Channel 21).

=== Documentary: Michael Des Barres: Who Do You Want Me to Be ===
In 2021, Des Barres released the documentary Who Do You Want Me to Be, directed by J. Elvis Weinstein, on streaming platforms plus DVD and Blu-ray. The tag line for the film is "The son of a junkie aristocrat and a schizophrenic showgirl becomes a master of reinvention on a 50+ year journey through rock and roll, TV, and movies."

== Personal life ==
In 1974, Des Barres married his girlfriend of seven years, actress Wendy Hamilton (Professor Emeritus Wendy Wheeler, London Metropolitan University). They divorced when Michael moved to Los Angeles following the dissolution of Silverhead.

Des Barres was married to Pamela Des Barres from 1977 until 1991. They have a son, Nicholas Des Barres, who is a writer and video game designer.

Des Barres has been sober since June 1981. In the mid-1980s, he was one of the founding members of Rock Against Drugs. He later did volunteer addiction counselling and worked with homeless teens. Des Barres has also organised and hosted the annual Don't Knock the Rock Film Festival, which first took place in 2003.

Des Barres married his long-term girlfriend, Britta Hayertz, on December 21, 2018.

== Discography ==
=== Studio albums ===
- I'm Only Human (1980)
- Somebody Up There Likes Me (1986)
- The Key to the Universe (2015)

=== with Silverhead ===
- Silverhead (1972)
- 16 and Savaged (1973)
- Live at the Rainbow (1975)

=== with Detective ===
- Detective (1977)
- It Takes One to Know One (1977)
- Live from the Atlantic Studios (1978)

=== with Chequered Past ===
- Chequered Past (1984)

=== with the Michael Des Barres Band ===
- Carnaby Street (2012)
- Hot n Sticky Live (2013)

== Filmography ==
=== Film ===
Year	Title	Role	Notes	ref
1967	To Sir, with Love	Williams		
1971	I, Monster	Boy in Alley	Released in the U.S. in 1973	
1974	Arizona Slim	Michael Pearson		
1985	Ghoulies	Malcolm Graves		
1987	Nightflyers	Jon Winderman		
1989	Pink Cadillac	Alex		
1990	Midnight Cabaret	Paul Van Dyke		
1992	Waxwork II: Lost in Time	George	Sequel to Waxwork (1988)	
1992	Under Siege	Domiani		
1997	Poison Ivy: The New Seduction	Ivan Greer	Sequel to Poison Ivy (1992) and Poison Ivy II: Lily (1996)	
1999	The Hungry Bachelors Club	Mr. Spinner	AKA Food for the Heart (DVD)	
1999	Sugar Town	Nick		
2001	Diary of a Sex Addict	Sammy		
2001	Mulholland Drive	Billy		
2001	The Man from Elysian Fields	Nigel Halsey		
2002	Ocean Park	Gower		
2004	Catch That Kid	Brisbane		
2012	California Solo	Wendell		

=== Television ===
Year	Title	Role	Notes	ref
1978	WKRP in Cincinnati	Dog w/ Scum of the Earth	Episode: "Hoodlum Rock"	
1980	Hart to Hart	Syd Sado	Episode: "Downhill to Death"	
1985	Miami Vice	Himself w/ The Power Station	Episode: "Whatever Works"	
1987–1991	MacGyver	Murdoc	Recurring role	
1988	Miami Vice	Shane DuBois	Episode: "Baseballs of Death"	
1988	ALF	Eddie	Episode: "Promises, Promises"	
1989	21 Jump Street	Mr. Karst / Gavin McHugh	2 episodes	
1991	Roseanne	Jerry Gimble	Episode: "Dances with Darlene"	
1992	Batman: The Animated Series	Carl Fowler / Nostromos (voice)	Episode: "Prophecy of Doom"	
1991–1993	The New WKRP in Cincinnati	Jack Allen	Recurring role	
1993	Seinfeld	Restaurateur	Episode: "The Smelly Car"	
1994	Lois & Clark: The New Adventures of Superman	Lenny Stoke	Episode: "Wall of Sound"	
1995	Freakazoid!	Man in the Hole (voice)	Episode: "Sewer Rescue"	
1995	Renegade	Michael St. John	Episode: "Hitman"	
1996–1997	Melrose Place	Arthur Field	Recurring role	
1996	Mortal Kombat: Defenders of the Realm	Kano (voice)	2 episodes	
1996	Spider-Man: The Animated Series	Jackson Wheele (voice)	Episode: "The Rocket Racer"	
1996	The Real Adventures of Jonny Quest	Merlin (voice)	Episode: "The Alchemist"	
1997	JAG	King Josif	Episode: "Washington Holiday"	
1998	Just Shoot Me!	Nick Hewitt	Episode: "Nina in the Cantina"	
1999	The Sylvester & Tweety Mysteries	Immigration Agent (voice)	Episode: "Brussels Sprouts"	
2002	My Guide to Becoming a Rock Star	Eric Darnell	Recurring role	
2002	Gilmore Girls	Claude Clemenceau	Episode: "A Deep-Fried Korean Thanksgiving"	
2002	Charmed	Dark Priest	Episode: "We're Off to See the Wizard"	
2004	Dead Like Me	Gideon Jeffries	Episode: "In Escrow"	
2004	Frasier	Georges	Episode: "And Frasier Makes Three"	
2004	JAG	Howie Black	Episode: "Trojan Horse"	
2005	Alias	Miles Devereaux	Episode: "The Index"	
2006	Four Kings	Nick Dresden	Recurring role	
2010	Bones	Simon Graham	Episode: "The Rocker in the Rinse Cycle"	
2012	The Finder	Icepick	Episode: "Voodoo Undo"	
2012	Suits	Sergei Baskov	Episode: "All In"	
2012	NCIS	Del Finney	Episode: "Phoenix"	
2014	CSI: Crime Scene Investigation	Marty 'The Cat' Kirch	Episode: "Long Road Home"	
2018–2019	MacGyver	Nicholas Helman	2 episodes	

=== Music videos ===
Year	Title	Artist(s)	Role
2011	"Moves like Jagger"	Maroon 5 featuring Christina Aguilera	Man on Stage
2016	"East Coast Girl"	Butch Walker	The Governor
