= WEB Entertainment =

Detroit-based record label

- Founded: 1992; 34 years ago
- Founder: Bass Brothers
- Defunct: 2013; 13 years ago
- Status: Defunct
- Genre: Hip hop; power pop
- Country of origin: United States
- Location: Detroit, Michigan

WEB Entertainment was a Detroit-based record label run by the Bass Brothers. It is best known for producing both of Eminem's independent releases, Infinite and the Slim Shady EP, his debut album and EP respectively, before he signed to Aftermath Entertainment and Interscope Records.

WEB Entertainment has been credited on each one of Eminem's major-label albums up to The Marshall Mathers LP 2, and the Bass Brothers continued to produce and co-produce most of his tracks up to The Eminem Show.

Detroit-based horrorcore artist King Gordy released his debut album titled The Entity, via WEB Entertainment in 2003. In that same year, power-pop band The Romantics released their 61/49.

In 2010, WEB Entertainment signed Detroit deaf rapper Sean Forbes and released his debut EP, "I'm Deaf", that year, with the B-side "Let's Mambo". The music video for "I'm Deaf" received national praise from Mitch Albom in Parade Magazine. In 2012, Forbes released his first full-length album, Perfect Imperfection. Although the label became defunct in 2013, Forbes has remained close with Eminem's camp, and in February 2022 he performed an American Sign Language interpretation of the Super Bowl LVI halftime show, which featured Eminem, alongside fellow deaf rapper Warren "Wawa" Snipe.

== Artists ==
=== Former ===
Act	Years on the label	Releases under the label
Eminem	1992—2013	10
King Gordy	2001—2003	1
The Romantics	2003—2004	1
Sean Forbes	2010—2012	2

== Discography ==
Artist	Album	Details
Eminem	Infinite	Released: November 12, 1996; Chart positions: —
Eminem	Slim Shady EP	Released: December 10, 1997; Chart positions: —
Eminem	The Slim Shady LP (released with Aftermath)	Released: February 23, 1999; Chart positions: #2 U.S.; RIAA certification: 5× Platinum
Eminem	The Marshall Mathers LP (released with Aftermath)	Released: May 23, 2000; Chart positions: #1 U.S.; RIAA certification: Diamond
Eminem	The Eminem Show (released with Shady and Aftermath)	Released: May 26, 2002; Chart positions: #1 U.S.; RIAA certification: Diamond
King Gordy	The Entity	Released: June 24, 2003; Chart positions: —
The Romantics	61/49	Released: September 9, 2003; Chart positions: —
Eminem	Encore (released with Shady and Aftermath)	Released: November 12, 2004; Chart positions: #1 U.S.; RIAA certification: 5× Platinum
Eminem	Curtain Call: The Hits (released with Shady and Aftermath)	Released: December 6, 2005; Chart positions: #1 U.S.; RIAA certification: Diamond
Eminem	Relapse (released with Shady and Aftermath)	Released: May 15, 2009; Chart positions: #1 U.S.; RIAA certification: 3× Platinum
Eminem	Recovery (released with Shady and Aftermath)	Released: June 18, 2010; Chart positions: #1 U.S.; RIAA certification: 8× Platinum
Sean Forbes	"I'm Deaf" / "Let's Mambo" (EP)	Released: May 11, 2010; Chart positions: —
Sean Forbes	Perfect Imperfection	Released: September 4, 2012; Chart positions: —
Eminem	The Marshall Mathers LP 2 (released with Shady and Aftermath)	Released: November 5, 2013; Chart positions: #1 U.S.; RIAA certification: 4× Platinum

== See also ==
- List of record labels
