= The Romantics =

American rock band

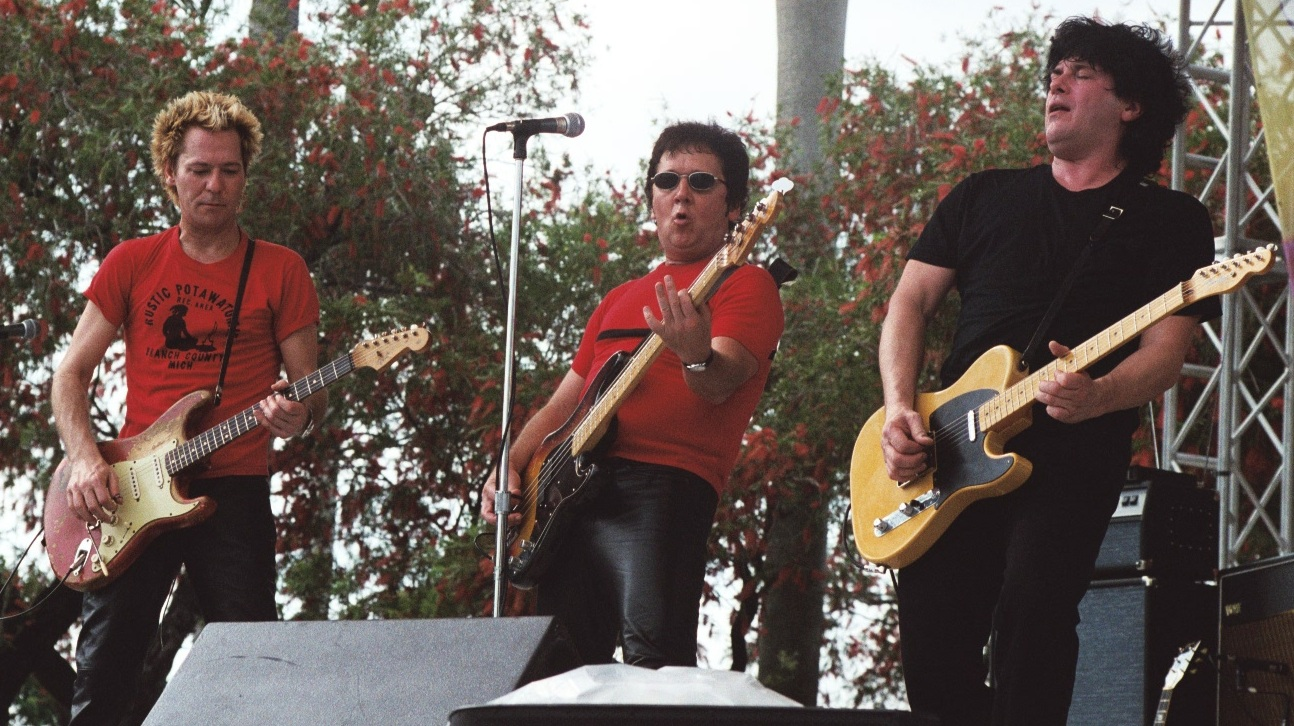
- The Romantics in 2003

Background information
- Origin: Detroit, Michigan, U.S.
- Genres: Power pop; new wave; pop rock; garage rock
- Years active: 1977–present
- Labels: Nemperor; Bomp!; Epic; Sire; Ktel; WEB
- Members: Wally Palmar; Coz Canler; Bruce Witkin; Joey Malone; Mike Rizzi
- Past members: Jimmy Marinos; Mike Skill; Rich Cole; David Petratos; Clem Burke
- Website: theromanticsdetroit.com

The Romantics are an American rock band formed in 1977 in Detroit, Michigan. The band's music is often categorized as power pop and new wave. They were influenced by 1950s American rock and roll, Detroit's MC5, the Stooges, early Bob Seger, Motown R&B, 1960s North American garage rock as well as the British Invasion rockers.

The Romantics achieved substantial popularity in the United States, Belgium, the Netherlands, Germany, Canada, and Australia, with their two best-charting songs "What I Like About You", peaking at #49 in the US and #2 in Australia, and "Talking in Your Sleep", reaching #3 in the US, #1 in Canada, and #14 in Australia. The two songs have become mainstays on 1980s-focused, classic rock, and active rock radio stations.

== History ==
=== The Romantics, National Breakout, and Strictly Personal (1977–1982) ===
The Romantics' original lineup consisted of vocalist, rhythm guitarist, and harmonicist Wally Palmar; lead guitarist and vocalist Mike Skill; bassist and backing vocalist Rich Cole; and drummer and vocalist Jimmy Marinos. All four band members made songwriting contributions to the group, but Palmar and Skill were considered the band's primary tunesmiths. The band's first show was on Valentine's Day at My Fair Lady Club in Detroit, opening for the New MC5 in 1977. For three years, the band was on the road, playing in venues like Boston's Rathskeller, New York City's CBGB and Max's Kansas City, and Cleveland's Agora. They were signed to Nat Weiss' Nemperor after a show at Hurrahs, and in September 1979, the band recorded their debut self-titled album with British producer Pete Solley. The group's true record debut was the 1978 single on Spider Records, "Little White Lies" (b/w "I Can't Tell You Anything"), followed that year by the Bomp! single "Tell It to Carrie" (b/w "First in Line"). All of these were re-recorded later for the first LP.

The album sold roughly 200,000 copies and yielded the hit "What I Like About You", which reached #49 in the US, #8 in the Netherlands, and #2 in Australia, where the band was especially popular. As all four members were singers, the straightforward beat of "What I Like About You" lent the opportunity for drummer Jimmy Marinos to take the vocals.

Mike Skill left the band after the release of the album National Breakout in 1980. He was replaced by lead guitarist Coz Canler. This lineup of the band recorded the album Strictly Personal in 1981 with producer Mike Stone, who had produced for Queen. Due to frustrations with the songwriting featured on the record, Rich Cole was replaced by a returning Skill, who took over as the band's bassist.

=== In Heat and Rhythm Romance (1983–1986) ===
With Skill back in, the band began playing arenas with Cheap Trick, the Kinks, and the Cars. Solley was also rehired in 1983 as their producer for their fourth album In Heat. In Heat would be The Romantics' greatest commercial success, and was awarded a gold album in the United States for selling over 500,000 copies. It eventually would sell over 900,000 US copies. In Heat was also awarded a gold album in Canada (for over 50,000 copies sold). The first single taken from In Heat, "Talking in Your Sleep", hit #3 for four weeks on the Billboard Hot 100 chart, reached #2 on the Album Rock Tracks, and #1 on the Hot Dance Club Play chart.

It was also a global success, scoring in many other countries such as #1 in Canada and #5 in Sweden. The single "One in a Million" peaked at #37 during the following year on the Billboard Hot 100 Chart and went to #21 on the Hot Dance Club Play Chart. The Romantics' music videos frequently were shown on MTV during this period, solidifying the band's popularity. Also during 1983, the Romantics played U.S. and international tours in support of In Heat, and appeared on television shows such as Solid Gold, American Bandstand, and Soul Train.

In 1984, drummer Jimmy Marinos left the Romantics, and he was replaced by David Petratos, who served as the band's drummer until 1990. This lineup released one album, 1985's Rhythm Romance, which peaked at #72 and produced one charting single ("Test of Time" #71). Detroit keyboardist Barry Warner was added to the band for the following 1985–1986 tour. Due to the tour for Rhythm Romance being thwarted by low ticket sales and mounting tension between the band and its management, The Romantics were dropped from the Sony record label.

=== Lawsuit, 61/49, and continued touring (1987–present) ===
In the late 1980s, the Romantics discovered that their managers had been misappropriating the profits earned by the band from its records and live performances. Additionally, one of their releases (the aforementioned "What I Like About You") had been licensed for use in television commercials without the band's knowledge or approval. Consequently, the Romantics filed a lawsuit against their management in 1987, and the legalities involved prevented the band from recording new music until the mid-1990s.

Former Blondie drummer Clem Burke replaced David Petratos as the Romantics' drummer in 1990. For much of the 1990s, the Romantics played obscure performances in small venues, largely forgotten and out of the public spotlight.

The Romantics' fortunes began to rise again in the middle of the 1990s, as the band's success in its lawsuit against its former management freed the band to record again (and ensured that future earnings from the licensing of Romantics songs would go to the band). The first fruit of the band's new recording activity was the 1993 UK-only EP Made In Detroit. Several Romantics greatest hits packages were issued during the 1990s, as was the live album The King Biscuit Flour Hour Presents: The Romantics Live In Concert, a 1996 release of an October 1983 recording of a Romantics concert in San Antonio, Texas at the height of the band's popularity.

Jimmy Marinos, the Romantics' original drummer, temporarily returned to the band for a series of performances in 1996–1997 (with Clem Burke returning to the Romantics' drumstool after Marinos departed again). In 2003, twenty years after the release of their most commercially successful album, In Heat, the Romantics released 61/49–a more roots rock and blues-oriented record than the band's previous efforts. Although Clem Burke performed as the band's primary drummer on the release, original drummer Jimmy Marinos is featured on half of the tracks. The album was not a great commercial success but it was well received by critics.

A fourth drummer, Brad Elvis, (formerly from the Elvis Brothers, and currently the Handcuffs) replaced Clem Burke as the Romantics' regular drummer in 2004 after Burke returned full-time to a reactivated Blondie. 61/49 was named most Outstanding National Small/Independent Label Album at the Detroit Music Awards in 2004.

On November 21, 2007, The Romantics filed a lawsuit against Activision, RedOctane, Harmonix, and Wavegroup Sound over the cover of the song "What I Like About You" used in Guitar Hero Encore: Rocks the 80s. While the game developers did secure appropriate rights to cover the song in the game, The Romantics claim that the cover is "virtually indistinguishable from the authentic version" and thus would "[confuse] consumers into believing that the band actually recorded the music and endorsed the product". The lawsuit requested the cessation of sales of the game and monetary damage.

A summary judgment hearing was held on July 9, 2008, the case was dismissed the next month, and U.S. District Judge Nancy G. Edmunds stated that Activision had obtained the proper licensing for the works and that the band no longer held the copyright on the work.

Rich Cole returned to the band after a long absence in 2010. Longtime lead guitarist Coz Canler left the band in 2011, allowing Skill to return to the original lead guitarist role he held in the band. In June 2011, the Romantics were voted into the Michigan Rock and Roll Legends Hall of Fame.

== Band members ==
Current members

- Wally Palmar – lead vocals, rhythm guitar, harmonica (1977–present), lead guitar (2022)
- Coz Canler – lead guitar, backing vocals (1981–2011, 2022–present)
- Bruce Witkin – bass, backing vocals (2022–present)
- Joey Malone – rhythm and lead guitar, backing vocals (2022–present)
- Mike Rizzi – drums, percussion, backing vocals (2024–present)

Former members (Note: Former members Jimmy Marinos and David Petratos occasionally make guest appearances. Rich Cole occasionally made guest appearances during his absence from 1982 until 2010. Clem Burke occasionally made guest appearances between 2004 and 2022, prior to his death in 2025.)

- Jimmy Marinos – drums, percussion, backing and occasional lead vocals (1977–1984, 1996–1997)
- David Petratos – drums, percussion, backing vocals (1984–1990)
- Clem Burke – drums, percussion (1990–1996, 1997–2004, 2022–2024; died 2025)
- Mike Skill – lead guitar (1977–1981, 2010–2022), bass (1983–2010), rhythm guitar (2010–2011), backing vocals (1977–1981, 1983–2022)
- Richard Cole – bass, backing and occasional lead vocals (1977–1982, 2010–2020)

Former touring musicians

- Johnny "Bee" Badanjek – drums, percussion (1992)
- Brad Elvis – drums, percussion (2004–2020)

== Discography ==
=== Studio albums ===
Year	Album	Peak positions				Certifications
Year	Album	US	AUS	CAN	SWE	Certifications
1980	The Romantics	61	78	—	—	
1980	National Breakout	176	—	—	—	
1981	Strictly Personal	182	—	—	—	
1983	In Heat	14	—	7	33	CAN: Gold; USA: Gold
1985	Rhythm Romance	72	—	62	—	
2003	61/49	—	—	—	—	
"—" denotes releases that failed to chart

=== EPs ===
Year	Album
1979	Tell It to Carrie/Runnin' Away/First in Line/Let's Swing
1993	Made in Detroit: UK-release only

=== Live albums ===
Year	Album
1986	The Best of the Biscuit: Notes: Recorded at Daddy's in San Antonio, Texas on May 6, 1984
1996	The King Biscuit Flour Hour Presents: The Romantics Live in Concert: Notes: Recorded October 30, 1983 in San Antonio, Texas.
1996	Live – One Night Stand

=== Compilation albums ===
Year	Album
1990	What I Like About You (And Other Romantic Hits)
1998	Super Hits

=== Singles ===
Year	Single	Peak chart positions									Certification	Album
Year	Single	US	US Main Rock	US Dance	AUS	CAN	GER	NL	SWE	SWI	Certification	Album
1977	"Little White Lies"	—	x	—	—	—	—	—	—	—		Non-album singles
1978	"Tell It to Carrie"	—	x	—	—	—	—	—	—	—		Non-album singles
1980	"What I Like About You"	49	x	—	2	—	—	8	—	—	ARIA: Gold	The Romantics
1980	"When I Look in Your Eyes"	—	x	—	—	—	—	—	—	—		The Romantics
1980	"Tell It to Carrie" (re-release)	—	x	—	—	—	—	—	—	—		The Romantics
1980	"Forever Yours"	—	x	—	—	—	—	—	—	—		National Breakout
1981	"A Night Like This"	—	x	—	—	—	—	—	—	—		National Breakout
1981	"No One Like You"	—	—	—	—	—	—	—	—	—		Strictly Personal
1983	"Talking in Your Sleep"	3	2	1	14	1	18	24	5	20		In Heat
1983	"Rock You Up"	—	49	—	—	—	—	—	—	—		In Heat
1984	"One in a Million"	37	22	21	—	—	—	—	—	—		In Heat
1985	"Test of Time"	71	44	—	—	—	—	—	—	—		Rhythm Romance
1985	"Mystified"	—	—	42	—	—	—	—	—	—		Rhythm Romance
2015	"Coming Back Home"	—	—	—	—	—	—	—	—	—		Non-album singles
2015	"Deck the Halls"	—	—	—	—	—	—	—	—	—		Non-album singles
2016	"Daydream Believer" (The Monkees cover)	—	—	—	—	—	—	—	—	—		Non-album singles
2016	"We Gotta Get Out of This Place"	—	—	—	—	—	—	—	—	—		Non-album singles
2017	"Hush"	—	—	—	—	—	—	—	—	—		Non-album singles
2017	"I Fought the Law"	—	—	—	—	—	—	—	—	—		Non-album singles
"—" denotes releases that failed to chart | "x" denotes that the chart did not exist at the time.

== See also ==
- List of power pop artists and songs
- Music of Detroit
