= Wally Palmar =

Ukrainian-American musician

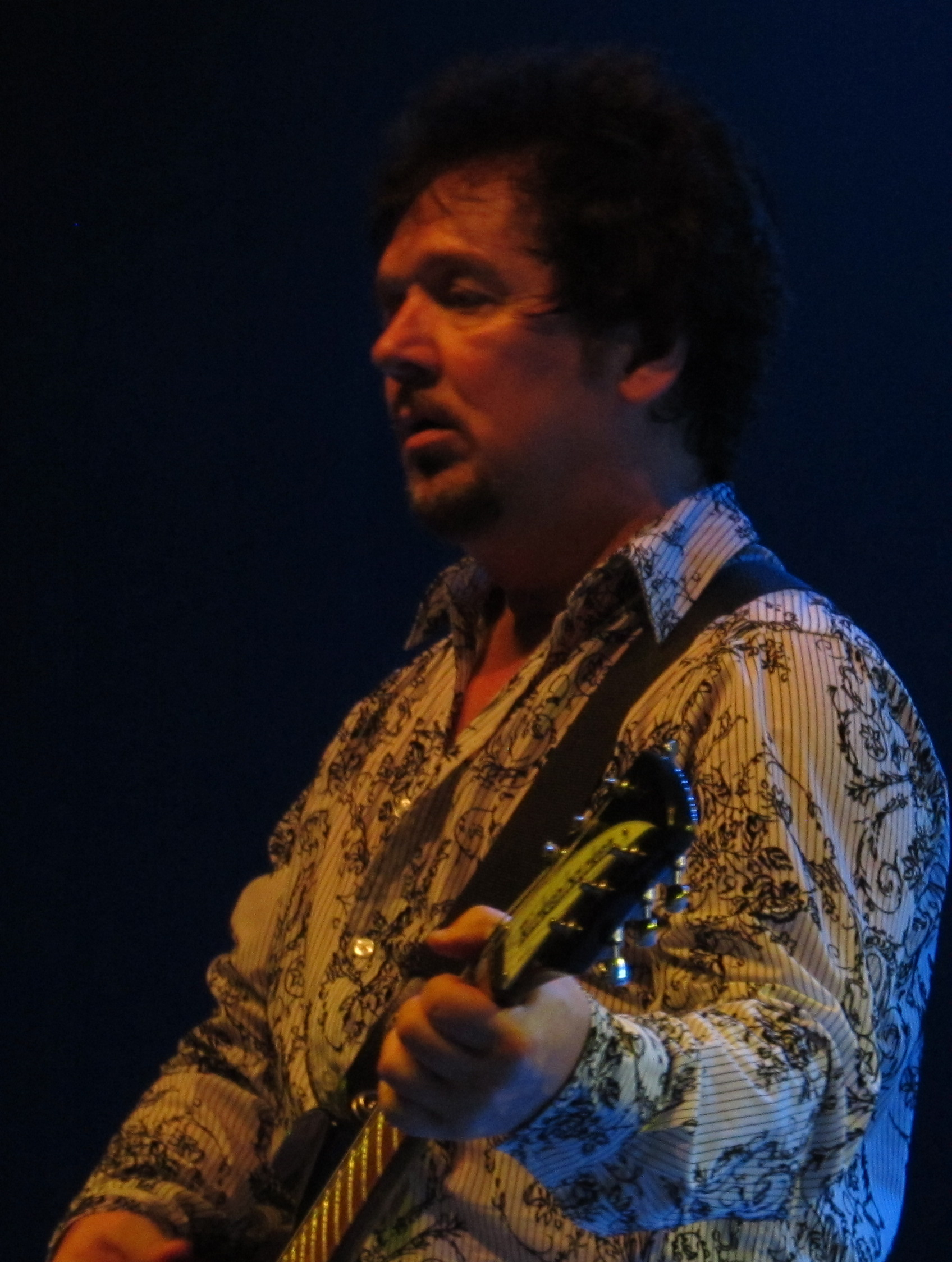
- Palmar performing in 2011

Background information
- Born: Volodymyr Palamarchuk; April 27, 1953 (age 72); Hamtramck, Michigan, U.S.
- Genres: Rock; new wave; power pop
- Occupations: Musician; singer; songwriter
- Instruments: Vocals; guitar; harmonica
- Years active: 1977–present
- Member of: The Romantics; The Empty Hearts
- Formerly of: Ringo Starr & His All-Starr Band

Volodymyr Palamarchuk (Note: Ukrainian: Володимир Паламарчук, romanized: Volodymyr Palamarchuk) (born April 27, 1953), known professionally as Wally Palmar, is an American musician best known as a founding member and lead singer of the Detroit rock band the Romantics.

== Early life ==
Palmar was born and raised in the Detroit enclave of Hamtramck, Michigan, to Ukrainian immigrant parents. He speaks Ukrainian fluently. As a youth, he was attracted to the music of the British Invasion. Palmar graduated from Immaculate Conception Ukrainian Catholic High School in 1971.

== Career ==
Palmar and several high school friends formed the Romantics in 1977 scoring their first record deal in 1979 with Nemperor Records. Their self-titled debut album for Nemperor in 1980 with British producer Pete Solley contained the band's first chart hit. "What I Like About You", which Palmar co-wrote, peaked at #49 on the Billboard Hot 100. The band's 1983 album, In Heat contained the band's biggest hit, the million-selling "Talking in Your Sleep". In early 1984, it spent several weeks at #3 on Billboard and featured Palmar on lead vocals. Palmar also provided lead vocals on the minor-hit follow-up single, "One in a Million".

In 2010 and 2011, Palmar toured as a part of Ringo Starr & His All-Starr Band performing "What I Like About You" and "Talking in Your Sleep". In 2014, Palmar was a founding member of the Empty Hearts. The group recorded on 429 Records and Palmar's bandmates included Blondie drummer Clem Burke, the Chesterfield Kings bassist Andy Babiuk, the Cars guitarist Elliot Easton, and Small Faces and Faces pianist Ian McLagan. The band's self-titled first album was released 5 August 2014 and produced by Ed Stasium.
