= Nemperor Records =

American jazz record label

- Parent company: Sony Music Entertainment
- Founded: 1974
- Founder: Brian Epstein, Nat Weiss Shaun Weiss
- Defunct: 1986
- Status: Inactive
- Genre: Jazz, pop
- Country of origin: U.S.

Nemperor Records was an American jazz and pop music record label active from 1974 to 1986. It was distributed by Atlantic Records from 1974 to 1977 and then CBS Records from 1978 until the label was absorbed by subsidiary Epic Records. The label's catalog is owned by Sony Music Entertainment.

It was founded in 1966 by the Beatles' manager Brian Epstein, together with Nat Weiss and Shaun Weiss as the management company Nemperor Artists. In 1974, the company became a record label after releasing the album Like Children by Jerry Goodman and Jan Hammer. Others who recorded for Nemperor include the Romantics, Phoebe Legere and Stanley Clarke.

== Sample discography ==
Catalogue no.	Artist	Album title
430	Jerry Goodman with Jan Hammer	Like Children
431	Stanley Clarke	Stanley Clarke
432	Jan Hammer	The First Seven Days
433	Stanley Clarke	Journey to Love
435	Lenny White	Venusian Summer
436	Tommy Bolin	Teaser
438	Andy Pratt	Resolution
439	Stanley Clarke	School Days
443	Andy Pratt	Shiver in the Night
4095	Steve Forbert	Little Stevie Orbit
