= The Very Best of Bucks Fizz =

Greatest hits album by Bucks Fizz
- Released: 14 May 2007
- Genre: Pop
- Label: Sony/BMG

Bucks Fizz chronology
The Lost Masters (2006)	The Very Best of Bucks Fizz (2007)	The Lost Masters 2 - The Final Cut (2008)

Professional ratings
Review scores
Source	Rating
Allmusic	3.5/5 stars

The Very Best of Bucks Fizz is a compilation album of the hits of pop group Bucks Fizz. The album was released in 2007 and was coupled with a DVD of the group's Promotional Videos. This was the first time the group's videos had been available on DVD. The album reached No.40 in the UK Charts - the first time Bucks Fizz had appeared on the album charts since 1986. Allmusic gave the album a favourable three and a half stars out of five, but commented on the fact that Bucks Fizz were always more successful as a singles band. A review in the Nottingham Post bemoaned the fact that while Bucks Fizz are usually remembered for their Eurovision winner, their later songs were much better, naming "My Camera Never Lies", "I Hear Talk" and "New Beginning" as particularly strong.

== Track listing ==
CD

1. "Making Your Mind Up" Hill / Danter from Bucks Fizz - 2:41
2. "The Land of Make Believe" Hill / Sinfield from Are You Ready - 3:50
3. "Piece of the Action" Hill from Bucks Fizz - 3:38
4. "One of Those Nights" Glen / Burns / Most from Bucks Fizz - 4:26
5. "My Camera Never Lies" Hill / Martin from Are You Ready - 3:35
6. "Now Those Days Are Gone" Hill / Martin from Are You Ready - 3:33
7. "If You Can't Stand the Heat" Hill / Bairnson from Hand Cut - 3:23
8. "Run for Your Life" Hill / Bairnson from Hand Cut - 4:11
9. "London Town" Hill from Greatest Hits - 3:23
10. "I Hear Talk" Hill / Sinfield from I Hear Talk - 4:37
11. "Talking in Your Sleep" Marinos / Skill / Palmer / Solley / Canler from I Hear Talk - 4:21
12. "Golden Days" Britten / Shifrin from I Hear Talk - 3:58
13. "You and Your Heart so Blue" Hill / Sinfield from Writing on the Wall - 3:59
14. "New Beginning (Mamba Seyra)" Myers / Gibber from Writing on the Wall - 4:05
15. "Love the One You're With" Stills from Writing on the Wall - 3:14
16. "Keep Each Other Warm" Hill / Sinfield from Writing on the Wall - 3:45
17. "Heart of Stone" Hill / Sinfield from The Story So Far - 4:22
18. "When We Were Young" Bacall from Greatest Hits - 3:51

DVD

Same track listing as above, but minus "One of Those Nights".

== Charts ==
Weekly chart performance for The Very Best of Bucks Fizz
Chart (2007)	Peak position
UK Albums (OCC)	40
