= List of songs recorded by Bucks Fizz =

This is a list of songs recorded and released by British pop group Bucks Fizz

== 0–9 ==
- 2020 Fizzion (2020)
- 10,9,8,7,6,5,4

== A ==
- Always Thinking of You
- Another Night
- Are You Ready

== B ==
- Because of Susan
- Breaking and Entering
- Breaking Me Up
- Brillar

== C ==
- Censored
- Christmas with The Fizz (2018)
- Cold War
- The Company You Keep

== D ==
- Don't Pay the Ferryman (Live)
- Don't Stop
- Don't Think You're Fooling Me
- Don't Turn Back

== E ==
- Easy Love
- El Mundo de Illusion
- Eso Fue Ayer
- Every Dream Has Broken
- Everything Under The Sun (2022)
- Evil Man

== F ==
- The f-z of Pop (2017)
- Fly Away (unreleased Polydor track)

== G ==
- Getting Kinda Lonely
- Give a Little Love
- Golden Days

== H ==
- Heart of Stone
- Here's Looking at You
- Hou Siente Soledades

== I ==
- I Can't Live Without Love
- Identity
- I'd Like to Say I Love You
- I Do It All for You
- If Paradise Is Half as Nice
- If You Can't Stand the Heat
- If You're Right
- I Hear Talk
- I Love Music
- Indebted to You
- I Need Your Love
- In Your Eyes
- Invisible
- It's Got to Be Love
- It Doesn't Feel Like Christmas
- I Used to Love the Radio

== J ==
- January's Gone

== K ==
- Keep Each Other Warm

== L ==
- Lady of the Night
- The Land of Make Believe
- Let's Get Wet
- London Town
- Love Dies Hard
- Love in a World Gone Mad
- Love the One You're With

== M ==
- Magical
- Making Your Mind Up
- Midnight Reservation
- Move Over (I'm Driving)
- My Camera Never Lies

== N ==
- New Beginning (Mamba Seyra)
- Noches Sin Ti
- Now Those Days Are Gone
- Now You're Gone

== O ==
- Oh Suzanne
- One of Those Nights
- One Touch (Don't Mean Devotion)
- One Touch Too Much
- One Way Love
- Otre Noche

== P ==
- Piece of the Action
- Pulling Me Under
- Putting the Heat On

== R ==
- Remixes & Rarities (2014)
- The Right Situation
- Rules of the Game
- Run for Your Life
- Running Out of Time

== S ==
- She Cries
- Shine On
- Shot Me Through the Heart
- Skin on Skin
- Smoke & Mirrors (2020)
- Soul Motion
- Stepping Out
- Surrender Your Heart

== T ==
- Takin' Me Higher
- Talking in Your Sleep
- Tears on the Ballroom Floor
- The Land of Make Believe (1982)
- These Boots Are Made for Walkin'
- Thief in the Night
- Too Hard
- Took it to the Limit
- Total Attraction (unreleased 1983 song)
- Twentieth Century Hero

== V ==
- Via Libre

== W ==
- What Am I Gonna Do
- What's Love Got to Do With It
- What's One Lonely Woman
- When the Love Has Gone
- When We Were at War
- When We Were Young
- Where Do I Go Now
- Where the Ending Starts

== Y ==
- Yo Se Que Es Amor
- You and Your Heart so Blue
- You Love Love
- Young Hearts
