= The Story So Far (Bucks Fizz album) =

Compilation album by Bucks Fizz
- Released: 5 December 1988
- Recorded: March 1981 – October 1988
- Genre: Pop; rock
- Length: 69:20
- Label: Stylus
- Producer: Andy Hill; Mike Myers

Bucks Fizz chronology
Writing on the Wall (1986)	The Story So Far (1988)	Live at the Fairfield Hall, Croydon (1991)

Singles from The Story so Far
- 1. "Heart of Stone" Released: October 1988; 2. "You Love Love" Released: May 1989

The Story So Far is a compilation album by British pop group Bucks Fizz, released in 1988. The album collects together 18 of the group's biggest hit singles spanning the years 1981 to 1988, including their three number ones.

== Background ==
The album was released in December 1988 on the Stylus record label, which had licensed the tracks from Bucks Fizz's record companies, RCA and Polydor. At the time, the group had just released the single "Heart of Stone", which became their 20th and final hit and was the only new song featured on this collection. Other tracks on the album are the bulk of the group's hit singles along with two album tracks. One notable omission however was "When We Were Young", one of the group's biggest hits. This was most likely because lead singer of the track, Jay Aston was no longer with the band. Another single, "You Love Love" from this album was released in 1989, but this was originally from their 1983 album, Hand Cut.

Professional ratings
Review scores
Source	Rating
Number One	4/5 stars

== Critical reception ==
The album was reviewed in Number One magazine, where it gained a favourable response, saying that Bucks Fizz made unashamedly good music and listing tracks "The Land of Make Believe", "If You Can't Stand the Heat" and "Making Your Mind Up" as favourites. The same magazine had also claimed current single "Heart of Stone" to be a contender for the Christmas number one, although this proved to be way out in terms of time (October) and actual peak position (No. 50).

== Commercial performance ==
The album failed to chart despite TV advertising and was the last album Bucks Fizz released featuring this line-up with Shelley Preston. The single "Heart of Stone" reached No. 50 in the UK singles chart during a three-week run.

== Track listing ==
=== Side one ===
No.	Title	Writer(s)	Origin	Length
1.	"Heart of Stone"	Andy Hill; Pete Sinfield	previously unreleased	4:01
2.	"Talking in Your Sleep"	Wally Palmar; Mike Skill; Coz Canler; Peter Solley; Jimmy Marinos	I Hear Talk	4:21
3.	"20th Century Hero" (live)	Hill; Sinfield	"Talking in Your Sleep" (EP)	3:17
4.	"One of Those Nights"	Steve Glen; Mike Burns; Dave Most	Bucks Fizz	4:25
5.	"Now Those Days Are Gone"	Hill; Nichola Martin	Are You Ready	3:34
6.	"Magical"	John Parr; Meat Loaf	Writing on the Wall	4:08
7.	"Piece of the Action"	Hill	Bucks Fizz	3:40
8.	"The Land of Make Believe"	Hill; Sinfield	Are You Ready	3:47
9.	"I Hear Talk"	Hill; Sinfield	I Hear Talk	4:40

=== Side two ===
No.	Title	Writer(s)	Origin	Length
1.	"New Beginning (Mamba Seyra)"	Mike Myers; Tony Gibber	Writing on the Wall	4:10
2.	"If You Can't Stand the Heat"	Hill; Ian Bairnson	Hand Cut	3:36
3.	"My Camera Never Lies"	Hill; Martin	Are You Ready	3:44
4.	"You Love Love"	Andy Sells	Hand Cut	3:42
5.	"Run for Your Life"	Hill; Bairnson	Hand Cut	4:10
6.	"You and Your Heart so Blue"	Hill; Sinfield	Writing on the Wall	3:59
7.	"London Town"	Hill	Greatest Hits	3:13
8.	"Making Your Mind Up"	Hill; John Danter	Bucks Fizz	2:41
9.	"Keep Each Other Warm"	Hill; Sinfield	Writing on the Wall	4:12

== Personnel ==
- Bobby G – vocals
- Cheryl Baker – vocals
- Mike Nolan – vocals
- Jay Aston – vocals on all tracks except "New Beginning (Mamba Seyra)", "Keep Each Other Warm" and "Heart of Stone"
- Shelley Preston – vocals on "New Beginning (Mamba Seyra)", "Keep Each Other Warm" and "Heart of Stone"
- Andy Hill – producer
- Mike Myers – co-producer on "New Beginning (Mamba Seyra)"
