= The Ultimate Anthology =

Compilation album by Bucks Fizz
- Released: 18 July 2005
- Genre: Pop
- Label: Sony/BMG
- Producer: Andy Hill and others

Bucks Fizz chronology
Live at the Fairfield Hall, Croydon (1991)	The Ultimate Anthology (2005)	The Lost Masters (2006)

Professional ratings
Review scores
Source	Rating
AllMusic	3.5/5 stars

The Ultimate Anthology is a compilation album by pop group Bucks Fizz.

Released in 2005, this album was significant in that it was the first release that contained all of Bucks Fizz's 20 hit singles together on one disc. The album was released by Sony/BMG in conjunction with Fat Dog Productions - who were a fan-based team of producers who later went on to produce The Lost Masters collections.

Many of the tracks on the album differed from the original 7" versions in that they featured a 'dead-end' rather than a fade-out. These recordings were produced at the time for television promotional appearances by the group. The album came with a Bonus disc of rare tracks and previously unreleased remixes.

In a review, Music Week said that among a number of Bucks Fizz compilations, this was "undeniably the best".

== Track listing ==
- Disc one
1. "Making Your Mind Up"
2. "Piece of the Action"
3. "One of Those Nights"
4. "The Land of Make Believe"
5. "My Camera Never Lies" (Dead End Version)
6. "Now Those Days Are Gone"
7. "If You Can't Stand the Heat" (Dead End Version)
8. "Run for Your Life"
9. "When We Were Young" (Dead End Version)
10. "London Town" (Dead End Version)
11. "Rules of the Game"
12. "Talking in Your Sleep"
13. "Golden Days" (Dead End Version)
14. "I Hear Talk" (Single Version)
15. "You and Your Heart so Blue"
16. "Magical"
17. "New Beginning (Mamba Seyra)"
18. "Love the One You're With" (7" Edit)
19. "Keep Each Other Warm" (Dead End Version)
20. "Heart of Stone"
- Bonus disc
1. "Oh Suzanne"
2. "When We Were Young" (Extended Club Mix)
3. "Rules of the Game" (Extended Mix)
4. "What's Love Got to Do with It?"
5. "You and Your Heart So Blue" (Extended Mix)
6. "New Beginning (Mamba Seyra)" (Original Extended Mix)
7. "Keep Each Other Warm" (Long Version)
8. "Give a Little Love" (Long Version)
9. "If Paradise is Half as Nice" (Extended Version) (Cheryl Baker solo track)
10. "This Fragile Heart" (Cheryl Baker solo track)
11. "My Camera Never Lies" (1987 Remix) (Previously Unreleased)
12. "The Land of Make Believe" (1991 Dance Funk Remix) (Previously Unreleased)

+ Hidden track
