= Shelley Preston =

- Also known as: Shelley Preston
- Born: Caroline Shelley Preston; 14 May 1964 (age 62); Hillingdon, England
- Genres: Pop, rock
- Occupations: Singer, songwriter, model
- Instruments: Vocals, tambourine
- Years active: 1985–present

Shelley Preston (born 14 May 1964) is a singer who is known for being a former member of the pop group Bucks Fizz, when she replaced Jay Aston in June 1985. Preston's biggest hit as a member of the band was the 1986 track "New Beginning", which reached the UK top ten. She left the group in December 1989. From 2004 to 2009, she was a member of the group The Original Bucks Fizz, along with former Bucks Fizz members Cheryl Baker and Mike Nolan.

== Career ==
Preston was born in Hillingdon, England. She started singing in her local Sunday school choir from 4 years of age. While she was still at school, she sang with the Bournemouth Operatic Society. She worked as a singer at a hotel nightclub in Sri Lanka for six months before being selected at a London audition to be the new member of Bucks Fizz.

Preston was introduced as the new member of Bucks Fizz to 14.5 million viewers on the BBC TV chat show Wogan, hosted by Terry Wogan in June 1985.

After the highly publicised introduction of Preston to Bucks Fizz, her first single release with the group, ‘Magical’, reached number 57 in the UK in the autumn of 1985. They returned to the UK top 10 when "New Beginning (Mamba Seyra)" was released in May 1986, reaching number 8. With its lavish production, multi layered vocals and heavy drum sound, it was well received by critics. Although the follow-up singles did not reach the UK top 40, the group continued to remain popular with their concert tour audiences. The singles were all on the album Writing on the Wall, which also included the original version of "Love In A World Gone Mad", intended for a single release in early 1987, however the single was subsequently cancelled. A re-recorded version featuring both Preston and Cheryl Baker on lead verses surfaced on the 2004 re-release of the Writing On The Wall album.

After leaving Bucks Fizz in 1989, Preston pursued a career as a backing vocalist, touring and appearing with artists such as Jason Donovan, INXS, Alannah Myles, Michael Bolton, Go West, Beverley Craven, Alexander O'Neal, Luther Vandross, Alison Moyet, Errol Brown and Belinda Carlisle. During the 1990s she worked as a model, appearing in a number of commercials In 1993 she became a member of The Brian May Band on his 1993 Back To The Light Tour. She was also the voice of Radio One as a featured vocalist on their idents for two years.

In 2001 she was invited to join the "chillout lounge" band Cloudfish, with Spandau Ballet saxophonist, Steve Norman. Together they wrote and produced their own material and released an EP in July 2006. They performed at Ronnie Scott's Jazz Club in Soho, London, and also played at Pacha in Ibiza.

In 2004, Preston reunited with Bucks Fizz bandmates Cheryl Baker, Mike Nolan and Bobby G for the Christmas Here & Now arena tour. Following this, Baker, Nolan and Preston decided to continue as The Original Bucks Fizz. As a three-piece they performed at various festivals, nightclubs, and toured theatres throughout the UK. In June 2008, they performed at the last G-A-Y night alongside McFly and The Feeling. In August 2008, Preston with Baker, Nolan and Aston took part in a makeover show for Living TV, which was aired in March 2009 and performed with Björn Again at the Hammersmith Apollo on 18 December 2008.

In April 2009, Preston left The Original Bucks Fizz and was replaced by the original Bucks Fizz band member, Jay Aston.

== Discography ==
With Bucks Fizz:

=== Singles ===
- September 1985 "Magical"
- June 1986 "New Beginning (Mamba Seyra)"
- August 1986 "Love the One You're With"
- November 1986 "Keep Each Other Warm"
- October 1988 "Heart of Stone"
- May 1989 "You Love Love"

=== Albums ===
- November 1986 Writing on the Wall
- November 1988 The Story So Far
- July 2005 The Ultimate Anthology
- August 2006 The Lost Masters
- May 2008 The Lost Masters 2: The Final Cut

== External line ==
- Shelley Preston on Instagram
- Bucks Fizz The Early Years
