= The Lost Masters (Bucks Fizz album) =

Compilation album by Bucks Fizz

Studio album by Bucks Fizz
- Released: 7 August 2006
- Genre: Pop
- Label: Sony/BMG
- Producers: Dean Murphy; Kevin Newell

Bucks Fizz chronology
The Ultimate Anthology (2005)	The Lost Masters (2006)	The Very Best of Bucks Fizz (2007)

The Lost Masters is the name given to an album project to release unheard, rare and extended remixes of songs by the English pop group Bucks Fizz. Two albums were originally released: The Lost Masters in 2006, and The Lost Masters 2 - The Final Cut in 2008. A third single-disc volume was released in April 2012 as a double-pack which included a re-release of the group's 1986 album Writing on the Wall. Finally, The Best of The Lost Masters, a 25-track compilation was released in April 2013, which also included a number of previously unreleased mixes.

== Background ==
The first album, The Lost Masters, was released in 2006 to coincide with the group's 25th anniversary, while The Lost Masters 2 - The Final Cut was released in 2008. Both albums consist of two CDs, and were released by Sony Music in association with Fat Dog Productions, led by Dean Murphy and fan producer Kevin Newell.

After working on the second edition, the producers found some more unreleased tracks. These were released as a third volume, together with a re-release of the group's final studio album Writing on the Wall. The 'new' tracks were solo recordings, three by Bobby G, one by Cheryl Baker, and one by Shelley Preston; all originally recorded in 1988. The live tracks were outtakes from the Live at the Fairfield Hall, Croydon album, which had been released in 1991. Unlike the first two, this album was released on Polydor Records through Universal Music.

In 2013, a final compilation was released: The Best of The Lost Masters and More!. This collected the best mixes from the first two albums, alongside a number of newly created or previously unreleased mixes. Producer Dean Murphy announced his retirement at the end of 2012, making this the last release of the series. This collection, which was released as a digital download only, was reviewed in the 1980s-themed magazine Classic Pop. In a 4-star review, journalist Mark Frith commended the album saying that "Great pop music is timeless and Bucks Fizz were much more than just 'that band that won Eurovision'". He singled out I Hear Talk and Heart of Stone as being particular highlights.

== The Lost Masters ==
=== Track listing ===
CD 1

1. Breaking Me Up (extended version) (6.58)
  writers: Andy Hill / Frank Musker, producer: Hill
2. Easy Love (Blazer's version) (3.41)
  writers: Hill / Nichola Martin, producer: Hill
3. If Paradise is Half as Nice (original version) (3.31)
  writers: Lucio Battisti / Jack Fishman, producer: Hill
4. Invisible (early version) (4.31)
  writers: Hill / Mike Batt, producer: Hill
5. I Love Music (3.59)
  writers: Gamble & Huff), producer: Simon Harris
6. Oh Suzanne (7" unreleased version) (4.48)
  writers: Hill / Warren Bacall, producer: Hill
7. I Can't Live Without Love (1986 version) (5.26)
  writers: Mary Unobsky / Daniel Ironstone / David Harvey, producer: Bobby G / Trevor Vallis
8. What's One Lonely Woman (Cheryl solo track) (4.15)
  writers: Hill / Don Black, producer: Hill
9. Thief in the Night (Extended version) (6.27)
  writers: Hill / Bacall, producer: Brian Tench
10. These Boots are Made for Walking (Shelley solo track) (3.44)
  writers: Lee Hazlewood, producer: Pete Woodroofe / Dean Murphy
11. Skin on Skin (Cheryl solo track) (3.54)
  writer: Hill, producer: Hill
12. Breaking and Entering (demo) (3.20)
  writers: Hill / Pete Sinfield, producer: Hill
13. You and Your Heart so Blue (So Blue mix) (4.38)
  writers: Hill / Sinfield, producer: Hill / Murphy
14. If You're Right (original version) (3.13)
  writers: Hill / Sinfield, producer: Hill
15. Young Hearts (unreleased version) (4.05)
  writer: Hill, producer: Nick Tauber
16. She Cries (original version) (4.08)
  writer: Nik Kershaw, producer: Pip Williams / Murphy

CD 2

1. Oh Suzanne (extended version) (6.39)
  writers: Hill / Bacall, producer: Hill
2. Indebted to You (dead-end version) (4.10)
  writers: Hill / Bacall, producer: Hill
3. I'd Like to Say I Love You (alternate take) (4.12)
  writer: Warren Harry, producer: Hill
4. My Camera Never Lies (2006 'Good Eyes' remix) (4.27)
  writers: Hill / Martin, producer: Hill / Murphy / Kevin Newell
5. Invisible (extended version) (6.31)
  writers: Hill / Batt, producer: Hill
6. Cold War (extended version) (5.57)
  writer: Dominic Bugatti, producer: Tench
7. Now Those Days Are Gone (2006) (3.16)
  writers: Hill / Martin, producer: Hill / Murphy
8. If You're Right (re-recorded version) (3.15)
  writers: Hill / Sinfield, producer: Hill / Murphy
9. Every Dream Has Broken (4.44)
  writer: Hill, producer: Williams / Murphy
10. New Beginning (Mamba Seyra) (original version) (4.01)
  writers: Mike Myers / Tony Gibber, producer: Hill / Myers
11. I Can't Live Without Love (1987 version) (4.28)
  writers: Unobsky / Ironstone / Harvey, producer: G / Tench
12. Tears on the Ballroom Floor (long version) (4.39)
  writers: Anthony Phillips / Roy Hill, producer: Tench
13. Move Over (I'm Driving) (4.02)
  writer: Hill, producer: Murphy
14. Young Hearts (Shelley's mix) (4.24)
  writer: Hill, producer: Tauber
15. You and Your Heart So Blue (a cappella version) (3.22)
  writers: Hill / Sinfield, producer: Hill

=== Personnel ===
- Dean Murphy - Album producer
- Kevin Newell - Executive producer
- Kevin Newell and Andy Popplewell - EQ and Line production
- Dean Murphy, Kevin Newell and Simon Murphy - Remasters
- Remastered at SRT Studios, St Ives, Cambridge

== The Lost Masters 2 - The Final Cut ==
The Lost Masters 2 - The Final Cut

Studio album by Bucks Fizz
- Released: 19 May 2008
- Genre: Pop
- Label: Sony/BMG
- Producers: Dean Murphy; Kevin Newell; Paul Kearsey

Bucks Fizz chronology
The Very Best of Bucks Fizz (2007)	The Lost Masters 2 - The Final Cut (2008)	The Best of the Lost Masters and More! (2013)

=== Track listing ===
CD 1

1. Talking in Your Sleep (full unedited version) (4.58)
  writers: Marinos / Palmer / Skill / Canler / Solley, producer: Andy Hill
2. Breaking Me Up (7" version) (4.36)
  writers: Hill / Frank Musker, producer: Hill
3. Rules of the Game (dead-end version) (3.44)
  writer: Warren Bacall, producer: Hill / Brian Tench
4. Piece of the Action (demo) (3.22)
  writer: Hill, producer: Hill
5. My Camera Never Lies (alternate mix) (4.13)
  writers: Hill / Nichola Martin, producer: Hill
6. Don't Think You're Foolin' Me (demo) (3.23)
  writer: Bobby G, producer: G
7. I'd Like to Say I Love You (alternate mix) (3.20)
  writer: Warren Harry, producer: Hill
8. Magical (the rock mix) (4.38)
  writers: Meat Loaf / John Parr, producer: Hill
9. Golden Days (extended version) (7.58)
  writers: Terry Britten, producer: Britten / Dean Murphy
10. If You Can't Stand the Heat (early mix) (3.26)
  writers: Hill / Ian Bairnson, producer: Hill
11. You and Your Heart so Blue (Andy Hill's Mauritus mix) (3.56)
  writers: Hill / Pete Sinfield, producer: Hill
12. The Right Situation (early mix) (3.02)
  writer: Hill, producer: Hill
13. Tears on the Ballroom Floor (the original idea) (4.13)
  writers: Anthony Phillips / Roy Hill, producer: Tench / Murphy
14. Every Dream Has Broken (early mix) (8.05)
  writer: Pip Williams, producer: Murphy

CD 2

1. "Another Night" (Alternate version) (3.40)
  Writer: Hill, Producer: Hill
2. "Easy Love" (European remix) (4.48)
  Writer: Hill / Martin, Producer: Hill
3. "Putting the Heat On" (3.14)
  Writer: G, Producer: G
4. "Run for Your Life" (2008 remix) (6.50)
  Writers: Hill / Bairnson, Producer: Hill / Murphy
5. "One of Those Nights" (Demo) (2.54)
  Writers: Steve Glen / Mike Burns / Dave Most, Producer: Hill
6. "Invisible" (Early edit) (3.57)
  Writer: Mike Batt, Producer: Hill
7. "You Love Love" (TV version) (3.38)
  Writer: Andy Sells, Producer: Hill
8. "Cold War" (7" version) (3.37)
  Writer: Dominic Bugatti, Producer: Tench
9. "Getting Kinda Lonely" (Unedited version) (6.18)
  Writer: Mike Burns, Producer: Hill
10. "Because of Susan" (3.07)
  Writer: G, Producer: G
11. "Indebted to You" (Alternate version) (5.01)
  Writers: Hill / Bacall, Producer: Hill
12. "The Land of Make Believe" (Extended remix) (6.39)
  Writers: Hill / Sinfield, Producer: Hill / Murphy
13. "Let's Get Wet" (Cheryl Baker lead vocal) (4.05)
  Writers: Glen / Burns, Producer: Glen
14. "Every Dream Has Broken" (Sugar Cube Vs Bucks Fizz remix) (8.39)
  Writer: Williams, Producer:Murphy / Darren Fox
- This album features a hidden track - a demo of "Now Those Days Are Gone" by producer Andy Hill. This track features an expletive, necessitating the album to carry a Parental Advisory sticker.

=== Personnel ===
- Dean Murphy - Album producer
- Kevin Newell and Paul Kearsey - Executive producers
- Simon Murphy and Kevin Newell - Masters
- Neil Martin - for Sony BMG
- Andy Hayes - Artwork

== The Lost Masters 3 ==
Bonus disc included with 2012 re-issue of Writing On the Wall

=== Track listing ===
1. "Love the One You're With" (Alternate mix) 3:27
  Writer: Stephen Stills
2. "Keep Each Other Warm" (The original idea) 5:21
  Writers: Andy Hill / Pete Sinfield
3. "Love in a World Gone Mad" (Shelley Preston solo track) 3:40
  Writers: Sinfield / Billy Livesey
4. "Big Deal" (1986 7") 3:35
  Writer: Bobby G
5. "I Want to Stay" (Unedited version) 4:12
  Writer: G
6. "What's One Lonely Woman" (Laid back mix 2011) 3:56
  Writer: Don Black
7. "The Company You Keep" (Demo) 3:36
  Writers: G / Steve Glen / Mike Burns
8. "Easy Trouble" (Cheryl Baker solo track) 4:12
  Writers: Glen / Burns
9. "One Heart" (Bobby G solo track) 4:13
  Writers: Glen / Burns / G
10. "I Should Have Been Strong" (Bobby G solo track) 3:21
  Writers: Glen / Burns / G
11. "Paper Hearts" (Shelley Preston solo track) 4:10
  Writers: Glen / Burns
12. "Innocent" (Bobby G solo track) 3:36
  Writers: Glen / Burns / G
13. "Big Deal" (1986 extended version) 5:00
  Writer: G
14. "Live Motown Medley" 8:43
  Writers: Holland / Dozier / Holland / Robinson / Gordy / West / Hutch / Davis
15. "Live Rolling Stones Medley" 6:56
  Writers: Mick Jagger / Keith Richards
16. "Soul Motion" (2011 extended version) 7:41
  Writers: Hill / Gary Bell

=== Personnel ===
- Dean Murphy and Kevin Newell - Producers
- Phil Bennett and Martin Blofield - Executive associates
- Alex Fryer - Associate
- Kevin Newell and Warwick Pilmer - Masters

== The Best of The Lost Masters and More! ==
The Best of The Lost Masters and More!

Studio album by Bucks Fizz
- Released: 26 April 2013
- Genre: Pop
- Label: Sony/BMG
- Producers: Dean Murphy; Kevin Newell

Bucks Fizz chronology
The Lost Masters 2 - The Final Cut (2008)	The Best of The Lost Masters and More! (2013)

Professional ratings
Review scores
Source	Rating
Classic Pop Magazine	4/5 stars

=== Track listing ===
1. "Breaking Me Up" (Extended Version) 6:58
  Taken from The Lost Masters
2. "Oh Suzanne" (Extended Version) 6:37
  Taken from The Lost Masters
3. "When We Were at War" (2012 Mix) 5:46
  Previously unreleased
4. "Invisible" (Extended Version) 6:29
  Taken from The Lost Masters
5. "Every Dream Has Broken" (2010 Extended Version) 8:14
  Previously unreleased
6. "Cold War" (Extended Version) 5:55
  Taken from The Lost Masters
7. "Young Hearts" (Alternate Mix) 4:01
  Previously unreleased
8. "One of Those Nights" (Extended Version) 6:36
  Previously unreleased
9. "Piece of the Action" (Demo) 3:23
  Taken from The Lost Masters 2
10. "You and Your Heart So Blue" (Andy Hill Mauritus Mix) 3:54
  Previously unreleased
11. "Easy Love" (European Version) 4:47
  Taken from The Lost Masters 2
12. "Big Deal" (1984 Extended Version) 6:01
  Previously unreleased on CD
13. "Another Night" (Alternate Version) 3:39
  Taken from The Lost Masters 2
14. "Heart of Stone" (Cheryl Lead Extended Version) 6:30
  Previously unreleased
15. "Tears on the Ballroom Floor" (Long Version) 4:37
  Taken from The Lost Masters
16. "Indebted to You" (Jay Aston Lead Vocal) 5:00
  Taken from The Lost Masters 2
17. "I Hear Talk" (Extra Talk Mix) 5:00
  Previously unreleased
18. "The Land of Make Believe" (Chris Paul Remix) 4:14
  Previously unreleased on CD
19. "She Cries" (Original Version) 4:07
  Taken from The Lost Masters
20. "Thief in the Night" (Extended Version) 6:25
  Taken from The Lost Masters
21. "One of Those Nights" (2012 7" Mix) 4:21
  Previously unreleased
22. "I'd Like to Say I Love You" (Alternate Mix) 3:18
  Taken from The Lost Masters 2
23. "Talking in Your Sleep" (Full Unedited Version) 4:56
  Taken from The Lost Masters 2
24. "Every Dream Has Broken" (Original Sugar Cube Remix) 4:05
  Previously unreleased
25. "Making Your Mind Up" (Acapella) 2:00
  Previously unreleased
