= List of Dutch Top 40 number-one singles of 1982 =

These hits topped the Dutch Top 40 in 1982 (see 1982 in music).

Issue Date	Song	Artist(s)	Reference
2 January	No Top 40 released		
9 January	"One of Us"	ABBA	
16 January	"One of Us"	ABBA	
23 January	"Je loog tegen mij"	Drukwerk	
30 January	"Je loog tegen mij"	Drukwerk	
6 February	"I Won't Let You Down"	Ph.D.	
13 February	"I Won't Let You Down"	Ph.D.	
20 February	"I Won't Let You Down"	Ph.D.	
27 February	"The Land of Make Believe"	Bucks Fizz	
6 March	"The Land of Make Believe"	Bucks Fizz	
13 March	"Maid of Orleans (The Waltz Joan of Arc)"	Orchestral Manoeuvres in the Dark	
20 March	"Maid of Orleans (The Waltz Joan of Arc)"	Orchestral Manoeuvres in the Dark	
27 March	"Maid of Orleans (The Waltz Joan of Arc)"	Orchestral Manoeuvres in the Dark	
3 April	"Maid of Orleans (The Waltz Joan of Arc)"	Orchestral Manoeuvres in the Dark	
10 April	"Aurora"	Nova	
17 April	"Aurora"	Nova	
24 April	"The Lion Sleeps Tonight"	Tight Fit	
1 May	"The Lion Sleeps Tonight"	Tight Fit	
8 May	"I Love Rock 'n' Roll"	Joan Jett & the Blackhearts	
15 May	"Ein bißchen Frieden" / "Een beetje vrede"	Nicole	
22 May	"Ein bißchen Frieden" / "Een beetje vrede"	Nicole	
29 May	"Ein bißchen Frieden" / "Een beetje vrede"	Nicole	
5 June	"Ein bißchen Frieden" / "Een beetje vrede"	Nicole	
12 June	"Can't Take My Eyes Off You"	Boys Town Gang	
19 June	"Can't Take My Eyes Off You"	Boys Town Gang	
26 June	"Can't Take My Eyes Off You"	Boys Town Gang	
3 July	"I Will Follow Him"	José	
10 July	"Someone Loves You Honey"	June Lodge & Prince Mohammed	
17 July	"Someone Loves You Honey"	June Lodge & Prince Mohammed	
24 July	"Someone Loves You Honey"	June Lodge & Prince Mohammed	
31 July	"Someone Loves You Honey"	June Lodge & Prince Mohammed	
7 August	"Someone Loves You Honey"	June Lodge & Prince Mohammed	
14 August	"Someone Loves You Honey"	June Lodge & Prince Mohammed	
21 August	"Als je huilt" / "Bim bam"	André van Duin	
28 August	"Als je huilt" / "Bim bam"	André van Duin	
4 September	"Als je huilt" / "Bim bam"	André van Duin	
11 September	"Als je huilt" / "Bim bam"	André van Duin	
18 September	"Twilight Zone"	Golden Earring	
25 September	"Twilight Zone"	Golden Earring	
2 October	"Private Investigations"	Dire Straits	
9 October	"Private Investigations"	Dire Straits	
16 October	"Private Investigations"	Dire Straits	
23 October	"Private Investigations"	Dire Straits	
30 October	"State of Independence"	Donna Summer	
6 November	"Pass the Dutchie"	Musical Youth	
13 November	"Pass the Dutchie"	Musical Youth	
20 November	"Pass the Dutchie"	Musical Youth	
27 November	"Pass the Dutchie"	Musical Youth	
4 December	"De bom"	Doe Maar	
11 December	"De bom"	Doe Maar	
18 December	"De bom"	Doe Maar	
25 December	"De bom"	Doe Maar	

== See also ==
- 1982 in music
