= Writing on the Wall (Bucks Fizz album) =

Studio album by Bucks Fizz
- Released: 24 November 1986
- Recorded: 1984–1986
- Genre: Pop
- Length: 43:40 (Vinyl)
- Label: Polydor
- Producer: Andy Hill; Bobby Gee; David Motion; Ian Bairnson; Mike Myers; Trevor Vallis

Bucks Fizz chronology
I Hear Talk (1984)	Writing on the Wall (1986)	The Story So Far (1988)

Singles from Writing on the Wall
- 1. "You and Your Heart so Blue" Released: June 1985; 2. "Magical" Released: September 1985; 3. "New Beginning (Mamba Seyra)" Released: 30 May 1986; 4. "Love the One You're With" Released: 20 August 1986; 5. "Keep Each Other Warm" Released: 17 November 1986

Writing on the Wall is the fifth studio album by the English pop group Bucks Fizz. It was released on 24 November 1986 and featured the comeback top ten single "New Beginning (Mamba Seyra)". It was their first and only album to feature then new member Shelley Preston and their only album released on Polydor Records. Despite the album being initially unsuccessful in the charts, it was re-released twice — first in 2004 and again in 2012, both times with different track listings. It was the group's final studio album.

== Overview ==
Writing on the Wall was a significant album in the Bucks Fizz catalogue for many reasons. Apart from being their final studio album, it was also the only one to feature newly recruited member Shelley Preston, who replaced Jay Aston a year before. It was also their first album on record label Polydor after their 5-year contract with RCA expired.

Despite this, the album contained three of its ten tracks from the RCA days. These were the first two singles, "You and Your Heart so Blue" and "Magical", along with a remix of "I Hear Talk", which was featured on their 1984 album of the same name, but included here as it had since become a big hit in the clubs in both the UK and US.

The biggest selling point of the album was the top ten comeback hit "New Beginning (Mamba Seyra)", released in May 1986. The song become their first big hit in some time and received some of their biggest critical acclaim. The group elected to release a cover version as the follow-up — a reworking of Stephen Stills' "Love the One You're With". The song stalled outside the top 40 and the next single, "Keep Each Other Warm", also failed to sell well.

The album, released in November 1986, could not sustain the comeback success of the "New Beginning" single and, despite positive reviews, didn't make a great impression on the charts. Because of this, a planned early 1987 single release of "Love in a World Gone Mad" was shelved. For member Mike Nolan, the title of the album was apt as he later stated "I didn't like the album at all, I hated it. It was all starting to fall apart for some reason. It just wasn't blending right." Of this period, member Cheryl Baker said "the later stuff was too Bobby heavy. [The producers found it] easier to just put Bobby in, do a vocal and then put some backing vocals on. The big successes of Bucks Fizz were the two-boy, two-girl thing. That really worked well."

On original release the album was issued on Vinyl, Cassette and Compact Disc, all with slightly varied track listings. The Cassette version boasted a whole side of extended remixes (cramming nine of the vinyl's ten songs on side one), while the Compact Disc version contained a new song, "Give a Little Love", in favour of the "I Hear Talk" extended mix. The album was re-issued on CD in 2004 with a very different track listing, featuring 1986-only tracks. Between 2004 and 2008, alternate versions of the tracks "New Beginning", "You and Your Heart So Blue", "Magical", "Keep Each Other Warm", "Love the One You're With" and "Love in a World Gone Mad" have been released on various Bucks Fizz compilations. The album was re-released yet again on CD in April 2012. This time as an "Ultimate edition" 2-CD set. The first CD follows closely to the 2004 track listing, but with remastered sound (the 2004 edition had received fan criticism due to lack of bass), while the second CD featured the third volume of The Lost Masters albums.

"Love in a World Gone Mad" was covered by ABBA singer Agnetha Fältskog on her 1987 album I Stand Alone. "Keep Each Other Warm" was covered by Barry Manilow and released on his self-titled album in 1989. Manilow's version was released as a single, reaching No. 7 on the U.S. Billboard Adult Contemporary chart. "You and Your Heart So Blue" was covered in 1992 by The Four Seasons.

== Reception and reviews ==
Professional ratings
Review scores
Source	Rating
Daily Mirror	3/5 stars
Number One	4/5 stars
Q	3/5 stars
Smash Hits	4/5 stars

Writing on the Wall received some of the group's best reviews. Smash Hits awarded the album an 8 out of 10 rating and singled out tracks "New Beginning", "You and your Heart so Blue" and "I Hear Talk" as being particularly strong. Reviewer Tom Hibbert said that "[their music] is awesomely brilliantly conceived pop music performed with relish", while the songs "are thoroughly ravishing, proper popular music". Number One magazine was impressed by the adult rock sound of many of the tracks, but feared that the album wouldn't stand up to repeated listenings. Nevertheless, they gave the album a 4 out of 5 rating, commenting that "Writing On the Wall sees the Fizzers moving ever further away from their light pop of old, [giving] a fair impression of American AOR rockers — in the most melodic way possible of course". The newly established Q Magazine rated the album 3 out of 5 and favoured the tracks "Keep Each Other Warm" and "The Company You Keep". On the re-issue in 2004, The Daily Mirror stated that though the album may not be cutting-edge, it had class, while Music Week labelled the album "a gem". Reviewing the 2012 re-release, Music News.com said the album saw the group lose their identity in a largely negative review. The album was rated two stars out of five but did compliment the group's performance, stating "The band themselves are in pretty good form and the performances are solid but subtleties are clobbered by the production".

In their year-end polls, Number One magazine rated Bucks Fizz as the thirteenth best act of 1986, and placed the single, "New Beginning", fifteenth in the best songs of the year. "New Beginning" became a much played song on radio during 1986 and elicited many positive comments from DJs, while the song remains a firm fan favourite — widely regarded as one of their best songs.

== Track listing ==
=== 1986 vinyl ===
Side One
No.	Title	Writer(s)	Producer(s)	Length
1.	"New Beginning (Mamba Seyra)"	Mike Myers, Tony Gibber	Myers / Andy Hill	4:08
2.	"You and Your Heart So Blue"	Andy Hill, Pete Sinfield	Hill	3:59
3.	"Soul Motion"	Andy Hill, Pete Sinfield	Hill / Trevor Vallis	4:03
4.	"Magical"	Meat Loaf, John Parr	Hill	4:07
5.	"Keep Each Other Warm" (Long version)	Andy Hill, Pete Sinfield	Hill	5.38

Side Two
No.	Title	Writer(s)	Producer(s)	Length
1.	"Love the One You're With"	Stephen Stills	Hill	3:23
2.	"Love in a World Gone Mad"	Billy Livesey, Pete Sinfield	David Motion	3:57
3.	"Don't Turn Back"	Ian Bairnson, Bobby Gee	Bairnson / Gee	4:16
4.	"The Company You Keep"	Mike Burns, Steve Glen, Bobby Gee	Gee	4:08
5.	"I Hear Talk" (Extended Mix)	Andy Hill, Pete Sinfield	Hill	6:58

=== 1986 Cassette ===
Side One
No.	Title	Writer(s)	Producer(s)	Length
1.	"New Beginning (Mamba Seyra)"	Myers, Gibber	Myers / Hill	4:08
2.	"You and Your Heart So Blue"	Hill, Sinfield	Hill	3:59
3.	"Soul Motion"	Hill, Sinfield	Hill / Vallis	4:03
4.	"Keep Each Other Warm"	Hill, Sinfield	Hill	4:12
5.	"Magical"	Meat Loaf, Parr	Hill	4:07
6.	"Love in a World Gone Mad"	Livesey, Sinfield	Motion	3:57
7.	"Don't Turn Back"	Bairnson, Gee	Bairnson / Gee	4:16
8.	"The Company You Keep"	Burns, Glen, Gee	Gee	4:08
9.	"Love the One You're With"	Stills	Hill	3:23

Side Two
No.	Title	Writer(s)	Producer(s)	Length
1.	"New Beginning" (Extended version)	Myers, Gibber	Myers / Hill	7:31
2.	"I Hear Talk" (Extended version)	Hill, Sinfield	Hill	6:58
3.	"Keep Each Other Warm" (Long version)	Hill, Sinfield	Hill	5:38
4.	"Love the One You're With" (Extended version)	Stills	Hill	7:51

=== 1986 CD ===
No.	Title	Writer(s)	Producer(s)	Length
1.	"New Beginning (Mamba Seyra)"	Myers, Gibber	Myers / Hill	4:08
2.	"You and Your Heart So Blue"	Hill, Sinfield	Hill	3:59
3.	"Soul Motion"	Hill, Sinfield	Hill / Vallis	4:03
4.	"Love the One You're With"	Stills	Hill	3:23
5.	"Keep Each Other Warm" (Long version)	Hill, Sinfield	Hill	5:38
6.	"Magical"	Meat Loaf, Parr	Hill	4:07
7.	"Love in a World Gone Mad"	Livesey, Sinfield	Motion	3:57
8.	"Don't Turn Back"	Bairnson, Gee	Bairnson / Gee	4:16
9.	"The Company You Keep"	Burns, Glen, Gee	Gee	4:08
10.	"Give a Little Love"	Diane Warren, Albert Hammond	Hill	3:30
11.	"Love the One You're With" (Extended version)	Stills	Hill	7:51
12.	"New Beginning" (Extended version)	Myers, Gibber	Myers / Hill	7:31

=== 2004 CD ===
No.	Title	Writer(s)	Producer(s)	Length
1.	"New Beginning (Mamba Seyra)" (Original version)	Myers, Gibber	Myers / Hill	4:40
2.	"Soul Motion"	Hill, Sinfield	Hill / Vallis	4:03
3.	"Love the One You're With" (Dance edit)	Stills	Hill	5:05
4.	"Keep Each Other Warm" (7" edit)	Hill, Sinfield	Hill	4:10
5.	"Love in a World Gone Mad" (1986 New version)	Livesey, Sinfield	Motion	3:48
6.	"Don't Turn Back"	Bairnson, Gee	Bairnson / Gee	4:16
7.	"The Company You Keep"	Burns, Glen, Gee	Gee	4:08
8.	"Give a Little Love"	Warren, Hammond	Hill	3:30
9.	"In Your Eyes"	Hill, Warren Bacall	Hill	4:18
10.	"Too Hard"	Bairnson, Gee	Gee	3:55
11.	"I Need Your Love"	Gee	Gee	4:37
12.	"New Beginning" (Ian Levine Club mix)	Myers, Gibber	Myers / Hill / Ian Levine	9:27
13.	"I Hear Talk" (1986 remix)	Hill, Sinfield	Hill	6:58
14.	"Love in a World Gone Mad" (1986 extended mix)	Livesey, Sinfield	Motion	6:44
15.	"New Beginning" (Ian Levine Dub mix)	Myers, Gibber	Myers / Hill / Levine	8:20

=== 2012 "Ultimate edition" ===
Side One
No.	Title	Writer(s)	Producer(s)	Length
1.	"New Beginning (Mamba Seyra)" (Full length version)	Myers, Gibber	Myers / Hill	4:40
2.	"Love the One You're With" (7" version)	Stills	Hill	3:26
3.	"Don't Turn Back"	Bairnson, Gee	Bairnson / Gee	4:53
4.	"Keep Each Other Warm" (Long version)	Hill, Sinfield	Hill	5:38
5.	"Love in a World Gone Mad" (1986 7" version)	Livesey, Sinfield	Motion	3:48
6.	"The Company You Keep"	Burns, Glen, Gee	Gee	4:08
7.	"Soul Motion"	Hill, Sinfield	Hill / Vallis	4:03
8.	"Give a Little Love" (Unedited version)	Warren, Hammond	Hill	4:38
9.	"In Your Eyes"	Hill, Bacall	Hill	4:18
10.	"I Need Your Love"	Gee	Gee	4:37
11.	"Too Hard"	Bairnson, Gee	Gee	3:55
12.	"Love the One You're With" (Extended version)	Stills	Hill	7:52
13.	"I Hear Talk" (1986 extended version)	Hill, Sinfield	Hill	6:58
14.	"Love in a World Gone Mad" (Extended version)	Livesey, Sinfield	Motion	6:44
15.	"New Beginning" (Extended version)	Myers, Gibber	Myers / Hill	7:33

== Personnel ==
Vocals

- Bobby G – lead vocals on "You and Your Heart so Blue", "Soul Motion", "Magical", "Keep Each Other Warm", "Love the One You're With", "Don't Turn Back", "I Hear Talk", "Too Hard" and "I Need Your Love", harmonica on "The Company You Keep"
- Cheryl Baker – lead vocals on "Give a Little Love", "Love in a World Gone Mad" and "In Your Eyes"
- Mike Nolan – lead vocals on "The Company You Keep"
- Shelley Preston – shared lead vocal on "Love in a World Gone Mad" (1986 version) and "In Your Eyes"

Musicians

- Andy Hill – guitar, bass, keyboards
- Felix Krish – bass
- Steve Price – bass
- Andrew Paresi – drums
- Gary Wallis – drums, percussion
- Graham Broad – drums
- Tony Beard – drums
- Ian Bairnson – guitar
- J.J. Bell – guitar
- Matthew Cang – guitar
- Alan Park – keyboards
- Danny Schogger – keyboards
- Nick Graham – keyboards
- Richard Cottle – keyboards
- Gary Hutchins – keyboard programming
- Peter Woodroffe – Fairlight programming
- Robert Lea – percussion
- Will Parnell – percussion
- Gary Barnacle – saxophone
- Martin Dobson – saxophone
- Mel Collins – saxophone
- Peter Thoms – trombone
- John Thirkell – trumpet
- Luke Tunney – trumpet

Production

- Andy Hill – Producer on "New Beginning", "You and Your Heart so Blue", "Soul Motion", "Magical", "Keep Each Other Warm", "Love the One You're With", "I Hear Talk"
- Bobby G – Producer on "Don't Turn Back", "The Company You Keep"
- David Motion – Producer on "Love in a World Gone Mad"
- Mike Myers – Producer on "New Beginning"
- Trevor Vallis – Producer on "Soul Motion", Engineer
- Brian Tench – Engineer
- David "Trigger" Fraser – Engineer
- Peter Woodroffe – Engineer
- Michael Hoppen – Photography
- Green Ink – Design
- Alwyn Clayden – Art direction

== Charts ==
Weekly chart performance for Writing on the Wall
Chart (1986)	Peak position
UK Albums (OCC)	89
