= Twilight Zone (Golden Earring song) =

1982 single by Golden Earring

Single by Golden Earring

from the album Cut
- B-side: "King Dark"
- Released: 23 August 1982
- Genre: Rock; pop rock; new wave
- Length: 7:58 (album version); 4:47 (single version)
- Label: 21
- Songwriter: George Kooymans
- Producer: Schell Schellekens

Golden Earring singles chronology
"Slow Down" (1981)	"Twilight Zone" (1982)	"The Devil Made Me Do It" (1983)

Audio sample
- "Twilight Zone": file; help

Music video
- "Twilight Zone" on YouTube

"Twilight Zone" is a song by Dutch band Golden Earring from their 16th studio album, Cut. It was written by the band's guitarist, George Kooymans, who drew inspiration from the spy thriller book The Bourne Identity (1980) rather than the 1960s mystery television series The Twilight Zone.

Their music video received rotation from MTV and became their second international hit after "Radar Love" (1973) and also the group's only top-10 hit on the US Billboard Hot 100 chart and reached No. 1 on the Billboard Rock Top Tracks chart.

In the 1990s, the song was later included on Rhino Records' New Wave Hits of the '80s series.

== Composition ==
Nic Renshaw, who writes a blog for KSM Guitars, describes the guitar riff at the beginning as an "eighth-note pulse" of B D E D B followed by a sixteenth note and dotted eighth-note, D and E, and another D which is an eighth note. Renshaw considers the "disruption" more interesting than an ordinary pattern, and it acts as a "set-up ... lining up a shot" so that at 3:10, "bassist Rinus Gerritsen knocks that shot out of the park."

Lead vocals are divided between Kooymans and Barry Hay. Each sings lead for one half of the first verse (first Kooymans, then Hay), and Hay sings lead for the second verse with backing by Kooymans and provides the spoken lines in the introduction and first verse. Kooymans sings lead on the choruses, backed by Hay.

== Music video ==
The music video, directed by Dick Maas, features a storyline with lead singer Barry Hay as an espionage agent who is apprehended by three henchmen (played by the other members of the band).

The music video was one of the first to feature a cinematic storyline and dance choreography and was a hit on the fledgling MTV network (in somewhat edited form, as the original European cut was notable for a sequence featuring a topless woman), helping the song to become the second international hit for the band. Golden Earring followed the success with an extensive tour of the United States, Canada and Europe. MTV commissioned the band to shoot a movie of the final "homecoming" concert of the tour in the Netherlands. The concert film, also directed by Dick Maas, included a brief introductory segment which was an extension of the Twilight Zone video; one writer described it as a "sharp looking video skit about spies or something", but criticized the actually 16mm concert footage as "grainy" and "washy yellow." The concert was released in 1984 as Live from The Twilight Zone along with an album of the concert titled Something Heavy Going Down: Live From The Twilight Zone, it aired on MTV and was published as video on VHS, Beta and Laserdisc.

The Cut album cover's image of the jack of diamonds playing card being shredded by a bullet is recreated repeatedly in the video, representing the life of the rogue agent.

== Track listing ==
7" single

Side A
No.	Title	Length
1.	"Twilight Zone" (video edit)	4:49

Side B
No.	Title	Length
1.	"King Dark"	3:35

12" single

Side A
No.	Title	Length
1.	"Twilight Zone" (album version)	7:58

Side B
No.	Title	Length
1.	"King Dark"	3:35

== Personnel ==
- George Kooymans - co-lead vocals, lead guitar, backing vocals
- Barry Hay - co-lead vocals, rhythm guitar, spoken words (intro), backing vocals
- Rinus Gerritsen - bass guitar, keyboards
- Cesar Zuiderwijk - drums

=== Additional personnel ===
- Robert Jan Stips - synthesizer

Street choirs on hit tracks "Twilight Zone" & "The Devil Made Me Do It" (album Cut) by:

- Steve Clisby (American Gypsy) - backup vocals
- Omar Dupree (American Gypsy) - backup vocals
- Evert Nieuwstede (Urban Heroes) - backup vocals

Golden Earring thanking American Gypsy & Evert Nieuwstede on album Cut (inner sleeve-LP & booklet-CD)

== Charts ==
=== Weekly charts ===
Chart (1982–1983)	Peak position
Australia (Kent Music Report)	79
Belgium (Ultratop 50 Flanders)	5
Canada Top Singles (RPM)	13
Netherlands (Dutch Top 40)	1
Netherlands (Single Top 100)	2
US Billboard Hot 100	10
US Mainstream Rock (Billboard)	1
US Cash Box Top 100	16

=== Year-end charts ===
Chart (1982)	Position
Belgium (Ultratop 50 Flanders)	52
Netherlands (Dutch Top 40)	13
Netherlands (Single Top 100)	20

Chart (1983)	Position
Canada Top Singles (RPM)	93
US Billboard Hot 100	19

== Cover versions ==
Music for The Twilight Zone pinball machine (1992) featured core elements from the song in many of its tracks.

William Shatner covered the song on his 2011 album, Seeking Major Tom.

Scoti*Slate included a cover on their album Good Fight in 2013.

== In popular culture ==
The song has been featured in several films and series including End of Watch (2012), The Americans (2013), Ozark (2022), and Godzilla x Kong: The New Empire (2024).

== See also ==
- List of Dutch Top 40 number-one singles of 1982
- List of Billboard Mainstream Rock number-one songs of the 1980s
