= You and Your Heart So Blue =

Single by Bucks Fizz

from the album Writing on the Wall
- B-side: "Now Those Days Are Gone"
- Released: June 1985
- Genre: Pop
- Length: 3.59
- Label: RCA
- Songwriters: Andy Hill, Peter Sinfield
- Producer: Andy Hill

Bucks Fizz singles chronology
"I Hear Talk" (1984)	"You and Your Heart So Blue" (1985)	"Magical" (1985)

Alternative cover
- Limited edition EP

"You and Your Heart So Blue" is a single by UK pop group Bucks Fizz. Released in June 1985, the song was written by Andy Hill and Peter Sinfield and was produced by Hill. This single was the last to feature member Jay Aston, who quit the group the same month.

== Background ==
The single release came at a traumatic time for the group. Having only just got over a coach crash, which had incapacitated the group for several months, the release date collided with member Jay Aston walking out of the band amid much publicity. Halfway through promoting the single, the group recruited a new female singer, Shelley Preston. As well as this, Bucks Fizz (with Aston) had recently filmed a TV special in Mauritius, but went unscreened as the production company had gone bankrupt midway through filming. The single became overshadowed in all the publicity and failed to reach the UK top 40, stalling at No.43, although is now considered by fans to be one of the group's best songs .

Aston was still with the group at the time of release, and they did some promotional TV work with her to support the song, but the promotional video for the song only featured three members. Mike Nolan has bad memories of this time with his recovery and upheaval in the band, saying "We did the video of [the song] after the accident and I have just horrible, horrible memories of it. That's why I hate that song". The new line-up with Preston was premiered on the popular talk-show, Wogan, where they elected to perform this song, although too late to revive its chart fortunes, it did slow it's descent dropping just one place from 56 to 57. Remembers Nolan, "We looked so awful on Wogan, we just didn't look right at all. It was as though we'd just been thrown together. I think we came back too soon, we should have stayed away for a long, long time. I video all our TV appearances for my mum, but I've wiped that one off." Preston however said "unlike the others, I enjoyed that Wogan programme because it was my first big TV show, so it will always be rather special to me."

The picture cover of the 7" and 12" single didn't feature a photo of the group, possibly because the membership was in a state of flux, although a limited edition EP of the single did feature the group - with Aston (although she was noticeably separated from the other three). The B-side of the song was the earlier Bucks Fizz hit, "Now Those Days Are Gone", which was included to signify the recovery of member Mike Nolan, who was the most badly injured of the group in the coach crash. The 12" version of the single included a new song, "Evil Man" - a song solely written and performed by departing member Aston, while the EP included two previously unreleased tracks, "One Touch (Don't Mean Devotion)" and "Censored" - both tracks which had previously been recorded by writer Andy Hill's spin-off group, Paris. "You and Your Heart so Blue" was later included on the group's fifth studio album Writing on the Wall, released in 1986.

An earlier version of "You and Your Heart So Blue" was uncovered during the making of the album The Lost Masters in 2006 and was included on the album in two different versions. This version was significantly different in that the lead vocals were sung by Cheryl Baker - rather than Bobby G as on the single version, and the song was completely different in tone, containing a light reggae beat in comparison to the heavy rock edge that the single had. Another alternate mix was featured on The Lost Masters 2 - The Final Cut, released in 2008.

"You and Your Heart So Blue" was covered in 1987 by pop group Amazulu and later in 1992 by The Four Seasons.

== Track listing ==
7" single

1. "You and Your Heart So Blue" (Andy Hill / Pete Sinfield)—3.59
2. "Now Those Days Are Gone" (Hill / Nichola Martin)—3.33

12" single

1. "You and Your Heart so Blue"—3.59
2. "Now Those Days Are Gone"—3.33
3. "Evil Man" (Jay Aston)—3.49

Limited-edition EP

1. "You and Your Heart so Blue"—3.59
2. "One Touch (Don't Mean Devotion)" (Hill)—5.07
3. "Now Those Days Are Gone"—3.33
4. "Censored" (Hill / Martin)—5.02
