= Magical (song) =

Single by Bucks Fizz

from the album Writing on the Wall
- B-side: "Oh Suzanne"
- Released: September 1985
- Length: 4.04
- Label: RCA
- Songwriters: Meat Loaf, John Parr
- Producer: Andy Hill

Bucks Fizz singles chronology
"You and Your Heart So Blue" (1985)	"Magical" (1985)	"New Beginning (Mamba Seyra)" (1986)

"Magical" is a song written by American musician Meat Loaf and British musician John Parr, and it was released as a 1985 single by Parr as a part of his self-titled debut album. A few months later, an alternative version of the song was released in the U.K. as a single by pop group Bucks Fizz. It entered the charts by both artists in the U.S. and U.K. respectively but was not a big hit for either, although Parr's version managed to rise into the top 40 of Billboard's Mainstream Rock chart.

== John Parr version ==
John Parr began working with Meat Loaf for the latter's 1984 album Bad Attitude. Together they composed some songs, including "Magical", which became the opening track for Parr's debut album. Parr scored a US hit with the song "Naughty Naughty" in late 1984 and was followed up in April 1985 by "Magical" which entered the Billboard Hot 100 that month but stalled at No.73. It also reached No.28 on the Mainstream Rock chart. In Parr's native UK the single made no impression, although he did go on to achieve success a few months later with the song "St. Elmo's Fire (Man in Motion)", prompting his album to enter the UK charts. "Magical" remains the only (released) song written by Meat Loaf that he never recorded.

=== Track listing ===
1. "Magical" (John Parr / Meat Loaf) 3:53
2. "Treat Me Like an Animal" (Parr) 4:27

=== Charts ===
Chart (1985)	Peak position
US Billboard Hot 100	73
US Billboard Top Rock Tracks	28

== Bucks Fizz version ==
Following the success of the rock-orientated track "Talking in Your Sleep", Bucks Fizz were keen to replicate it with the release of this similar-themed song. This was the heaviest sound the group ever adopted. With the public still familiar with their clean-cut pop image, the move was unsuccessful and "Magical" became the group's lowest charting single. Released in September 1985, the song reached No. 57 and spent only three weeks on the chart.

The single was significant in that it was the first release with new member Shelley Preston, who had joined a few months earlier, although she didn't perform on the recording. It was also the group's last release with label RCA before their move to Polydor early the following year. Due to the failure of the single, plans for an album release at this time were shelved for a year. The song eventually featured on their fifth album Writing on the Wall, released in 1986. An alternative edit of the song, featuring vocals by departed member Jay Aston was uncovered during production for the album The Lost Masters 2 - The Final Cut. The song was included on the 2008 album.

The B-side of the single was "Oh Suzanne", written by Warren Bacall. This song had been released two years previously on the group's Greatest Hits album. At the time of original release, it caused controversy within the group as it had featured lead vocals by Jay Aston, but they were removed and replaced by a lead vocal by other female member Cheryl Baker. Years later, Aston commented on the incident and was angered by the time and money that had been spent re-recording it. In 2006, this original version was uncovered and included on the compilation; The Lost Masters, as well as an extended 12" version, hinting that it may have been considered for A-side release.

=== Track listing ===
7" vinyl

1. "Magical" (John Parr / Meat Loaf) 4:04
2. "Oh Suzanne" (Andy Hill / Warren Bacall) 4:44

12" vinyl

1. "Magical" 4:04
2. "Oh Suzanne" 4:44
3. "You and Your Heart So Blue" (extended mix) (Hill / Peter Sinfield) 6:04
