= Love the One You're With =

1970 single by Stephen Stills

Single by Stephen Stills

from the album Stephen Stills
- B-side: "To a Flame"
- Released: November 1970
- Recorded: June–July 1970
- Studio: Island, London, UK; Wally Heider, Los Angeles, US
- Genre: Folk rock
- Length: 3:03
- Label: Atlantic
- Songwriter: Stephen Stills
- Producer: Stephen Stills

Stephen Stills singles chronology
"Season of the Witch" (1968)	"Love the One You're With" (1970)	"Sit Yourself Down" (1971)

Official audio
- "Love the One You're With" on YouTube

"Love the One You're With" is a song by American folk rock musician Stephen Stills. It was released in November 1970 by Atlantic Records, as the lead single from his eponymous debut solo studio album (1970). The song, inspired by a remark Stills heard from musician Billy Preston, became his biggest hit single, peaking at No. 14 and 16 on the US Billboard Hot 100 and Cash Box Top 100 charts in early 1971.

David Crosby and Graham Nash, Stills's fellow members of Crosby, Stills & Nash, provided background vocals on the song. Rita Coolidge, her sister Priscilla Jones, and John Sebastian also provided background vocals. The song was later recorded by various artists including the Isley Brothers, The Meters, Bucks Fizz, Luther Vandross, Firefall, and Bob Seger.

== Background ==
Stills wrote the song after being inspired by the tag line – "If you can't be with the one you love, love the one you're with" which was a frequent remark by musician Billy Preston. Stills explained in 1991: "This song has been very good to me. The title came from a party with Billy Preston. Then I asked him if I could pinch this line he had, and he said, 'Sure.' So I took the phrase and wrote a song around it. It's a good times song, just a bit of fun. My favorite part is the steel drums. I played them before a little bit but I just kept diddling around till I found the right notes." Billy Preston may have been familiar with the song "When I'm Not Near the Girl I Love" from the 1947 musical Finian's Rainbow which has the line "When I can't be with the girl I love, I love the girl I'm with". Like the majority of the album, Stills recorded the song over the previous summer. Former CSNY bandmate Graham Nash recalled in his book Wild Tales: "Stephen called and said, 'You remember that song of mine, "Love the One You’re With," that I cut in London? Well, I've brought the track back and we're in Wally Heider's with it. I need voices for the choruses. Any chance you and David would come down?'".

== Reception ==
Cash Box said that Stills's "unique melodic work, the harmonies and a booming rhythm track make this a bright attraction for top forty as well as FM playlists." Record World said that "Stills shines with the help of some fine background singers and his vocal style is exemplary, as usual. The song's universal message is put across with a bright, yet driving, delivery."

== Musicians ==
- Stephen Stills – vocals, guitar, organ, steel drums, percussion
- Calvin "Fuzzy" Samuel– bass guitar
- Jeff Whittaker – congas
- Rita Coolidge, David Crosby, Priscilla Jones, Graham Nash, John Sebastian – backing vocals

== Charts ==
=== Weekly charts ===
Chart (1970–1971)	Peak position
Australia (Kent Music Report)	29
Finland (Finnish Singles Chart)	28
Canada Top Singles (RPM)	6
Canada Adult Contemporary (RPM)	17
Netherlands (Single Top 100)	9
Netherlands (Dutch Top 40)	18
UK Singles (Official Charts)	37
US Billboard Hot 100	14
US Easy Listening (Billboard)	32
US Cash Box Top 100	16
US Record World Singles	10

=== Year-end charts ===
Chart (1971)	Rank
Canada (RPM)	85

== Isley Brothers version ==
"Love the One You're With"
- Side A of the original US single

Single by the Isley Brothers

from the album Givin' It Back
- B-side: "He's Got Your Love"
- Released: May 1971
- Recorded: 1971
- Studio: Mediasound, New York City
- Length: 3:27
- Label: T-Neck; Buddah
- Songwriter: Stephen Stills
- Producers: Ronald Isley; Rudolph Isley

The Isley Brothers singles chronology
"Warpath" (1971)	"Love the One You're With" (1971)	"Spill the Wine" (1971)

Official audio
- "Love the One You're With" on YouTube

Several acts have since recorded the song, most notably, in 1971, American soul group the Isley Brothers as the lead single from their ninth studio album, Givin' It Back (1971), whose unique gospel-driven rendering of the song sent it to the charts again reaching number three R&B and number 18 pop, giving the group their fifth US top 40 pop single. It also reached number ten on the US Cash Box Top 100. On the Canadian charts, their version reached number 41.

== Bucks Fizz version ==
"Love the One You're With"

Single by Bucks Fizz

from the album Writing on the Wall
- B-side: "Too Hard"
- Released: August 20, 1986
- Genre: Pop rock
- Length: 3:28
- Label: Polydor
- Songwriter: Stephen Stills
- Producer: Andy Hill

Bucks Fizz singles chronology
"New Beginning (Mamba Seyra)" (1986)	"Love the One You're With" (1986)	"Keep Each Other Warm" (1986)

Music video
- "Love the One You're With" on YouTube

British pop group Bucks Fizz covered the song as the fourth and penultimate single of their fifth album, Writing on the Wall (1986). The single, released in August, was the follow-up to the group's comeback top ten hit "New Beginning (Mamba Seyra)" and was seen as a make or break release. Ultimately the song peaked at a low No.47 in the UK Singles Chart during a three-week run. In a review, music magazine Number One said that the song lacked bass and sounded rather "tinny" but predicted that it would be a hit.

Bucks Fizz member Mike Nolan puts the song's chart failure down to the decision to showcase other male member Bobby G as the lead singer. Their previous single had featured all the group equally and was a hit, while earlier flops had featured Bobby G on lead and this was a return to that format. A promotional video for the song was filmed featuring the group performing the song in a blue-toned studio accompanied by backing musicians. The single was released on 7" and 12" on Polydor Records with an extended mix on the latter, the B-side was a Bobby G composition, "Too Hard". Also included on the 12" was an extended mix of earlier single "I Hear Talk". A second 12" single was released featuring a dance edit of "Love the One You're With", backed by another alternate mix of "I Hear Talk".

== Chantoozies version ==
"Love the One You're With"

Single by Chantoozies

from the album Gild the Lily
- Released: February 1991
- Genre: Pop
- Length: 3:49
- Label: Mushroom
- Songwriter: Stephen Stills
- Producer: John Van Tongeren

Chantoozies singles chronology
"Walk On" (1990)	"Love the One You're With" (1991)	"I'll Be There" (1991)

Music video
- "Love the One You're With" on YouTube

Australian pop group the Chantoozies released a version in February 1991. The song was the third and final single from the group's second studio album, Gild the Lily (1991). The song peaked at number 21 on the Australian charts.

=== Charts ===
Chart (1991)	Peak position
Australia (ARIA)	21

== Luther Vandross version ==
"Love the One You're With"

Single by Luther Vandross

from the album Songs
- Released: November 14, 1994
- Length: 5:04
- Label: Epic
- Songwriter: Stephen Stills
- Producer: Walter Afanasieff

Luther Vandross singles chronology
"Always and Forever" (1994)	"Love the One You're With" (1994)	"Going in Circles" (1995)

Music video
- "Love the One You're With" on YouTube

American singer-songwriter Luther Vandross released a version of the song on his ninth album, Songs (1994). It peaked within the top 30 of the US Billboard Hot R&B Singles chart, reached number 33 on the Billboard Hot Adult Contemporary Tracks chart, and earned Vandross a 1995 Grammy nomination for Best Male Pop Vocal Performance. The single also peaked at numbers 90 and 95 on the US Cash Box Top 100 and Billboard Hot 100 charts. It was accompanied by a black-and-white music video.

=== Critical reception ===
M.R. Martinez from Cash Box described "Love the One You’re With" as "an optimistic celebration of love and music as Vandross is backed by an all-star choir that includes Lisa Fischer, Tawatha Gee, Jim Gilstrap and others." Fell and Rufer from the Gavin Report wrote, "This 25-year-old Stephen Stills song was urbanized before by the Isley Brothers, but Luther turns it into a gospel hoot complete with the original Hammond organ effects from Stills's take. This is the song that garnered Vandross a Grammy nomination even before it was released as a single."

Dennis Hunt from Los Angeles Times felt Vandross "gives a leaden feel to the normally joyous 'Love the One You're With', undercutting a breezy, gospel-style arrangement." Pan-European magazine Music & Media commented, "Hailed the King of silky ballads, Luther also knows how to speed it up. In a New Orleans way, and challenged by a gospel group, this [...] cover shows him at his toughest." Alan Jones from Music Week complimented it as "a nice remake".

=== Charts ===
Chart (1994–1995)	Peak position
Australia (ARIA)	56
Canada Top Singles (RPM)	40
Europe (European Hit Radio)	26
Iceland (Íslenski Listinn Topp 40)	38
Scotland (OCC)	41
UK Singles (OCC)	31
UK Airplay (Music Week)	8
US Billboard Hot 100	95
US Hot Adult Contemporary Tracks (Billboard)	33
US Hot R&B Singles (Billboard)	28
US Cash Box Top 100	90

== Other notable versions ==
- Gino Soccio reached number 79 in Canada with a 1988 recording of the song.
- Dutch duo Pep & Rash sampled this song in their song of the same name in 2016, which was a minor hit at Number 79 in French Belgium.

== In culture ==
In 2012, the song was featured in Ridley Scott's science fiction movie Prometheus. Idris Elba, playing Janek, sings a short phrase from the song after claiming his squeezebox once belonged to Stephen Stills.

In 2022 the song featured in the season finale of BBC series Blue Lights.
