= I Hear Talk (song) =

Single by Bucks Fizz

from the album I Hear Talk
- B-side: "Pulling Me Under"
- Released: 15 December 1984
- Genre: Pop
- Length: 4.39
- Label: RCA
- Songwriters: Andy Hill, Peter Sinfield
- Producer: Andy Hill

Bucks Fizz singles chronology
"Golden Days" (1984)	"I Hear Talk" (1984)	"You and Your Heart So Blue" (1985)

Alternative cover
- The Original Bucks Fizz (2010)

"I Hear Talk" is a 1984 single by UK pop group Bucks Fizz, written by Andy Hill and Peter Sinfield, the team responsible for the group's biggest hit in the UK, "The Land of Make Believe". It was also produced by Hill. Released as a single in December 1984, it is the title track from the group's fourth studio album. In 2010, the song was chosen as the first single by the Original Bucks Fizz in a live jazz-style reworking.

== Background ==
Released on 15 December 1984, the single coincided with a much-publicised coach crash that the group had experienced earlier in the week. While the group were returning from a gig in Newcastle, their tour bus collided with road works and careened off the road, injuring the members of the group as well their entourage. Mike Nolan was badly injured and the group were inactive for several months. As a result, promotion for the single was minimal and the song failed to chart as highly as had been expected, reaching No.34 in the UK despite being a fan favourite. Reviewing the single for Number One magazine, pop group Bananarama made positive comments about the song, saying that it had "something that their last few singles didn't." Bucks Fizz member Cheryl Baker has also commented that "I Hear Talk" is among her favourite Bucks Fizz songs..

The song's lyrics centre on a man's jealousy within his relationship after hearing rumours that his partner has been cheating on him. The lead vocalist for the song is Bobby G, while the middle 8 section is performed by Baker alone. The B-side of the single, "Pulling Me Under", was written and performed solely by Bobby G, while an extra track on the 12" single, "Invisible", featured member Jay Aston on lead. "Invisible" had been planned as a single for the group in 1983, but it was replaced on short notice by "London Town". On the 12" single, it appeared in a remixed form, although the original was later released on the compilation The Lost Masters in 2006. The song was co-written by Mike Batt, his only Bucks Fizz contribution.

Bucks Fizz in the promotional video for "I Hear Talk"

The group's promotional video for the song, recorded before the accident, was studio-bound and depicted the group walking around in a snowy location. Later, the group are seen performing the song against a black background. Bucks Fizz had also recorded a performance of the song for TV show Razzamatazz on 11 December, the day of the coach crash, which was transmitted some weeks later. The single entered the charts in the last week of 1984 and rose to No. 34 in January 1985, where it stayed for three consecutive weeks but failed to climb further. The second of these weeks saw TV show Top of the Pops feature a clip of the video in the debut of its "breakers" section that would run for many years afterward.

"I Hear Talk", in a slightly different mix, was featured on the group's album of the same name, released a month earlier. A 12" version of the song was also released. The single cover featured the same photograph as the album, but against a white background rather than black. A limited-edition poster calendar for 1985 was included as well. Over the next two years, the song became a popular club hit and reached the Billboard dance charts, the group's only American success. Because of this renewed interest in the song, another remix was featured on the group's 1986 album Writing on the Wall. In the 2000s, a new version of the song was mixed with added vocals by later member Shelley Preston. This version was eventually released on the 2013 compilation The Best of The Lost Masters and More!. Journalist Mark Frith complimented the song, labelling it "euphoric" and saying that it deserved to reach No. 1.

The song was later covered and released as a single by girl-group Teen Dream, but failed to chart.

On 24 May 2010, the Original Bucks Fizz released a jazz-style reworking of "I Hear Talk" as their debut single. The song was performed on their 2009 tour in this style. The new arrangement was devised by Baker's husband, Steve Stroud, who also plays bass on the track. A promotional video of the group performing on tour was also compiled for the release.

== Track listing ==
7" single

1. "I Hear Talk" (Andy Hill / Peter Sinfield) (4.39)
2. "Pulling Me Under" (Bobby G) (4.15)

12" single

1. "I Hear Talk (extended mix)" (Andy Hill / Peter Sinfield) (7.34)
2. "Pulling Me Under" (Bobby G) (4.15)
3. "Invisible" (Andy Hill / Mike Batt) (4.35)

2010 download single

1. "I Hear Talk" (Live) (Andy Hill / Peter Sinfield) (3.47)
2. "Everlasting Love" (Live) (Jay Aston) (3.50)

== Chart positions ==
Country	Peak position
UK	34
Ireland	29
