= Keep Each Other Warm =

Single by Bucks Fizz

from the album Writing on the Wall
- B-side: "Give a Little Love"
- Released: 17 November 1986
- Genre: Pop
- Length: 4:12
- Label: Polydor
- Songwriters: Andy Hill, Peter Sinfield
- Producer: Andy Hill

Bucks Fizz singles chronology
"Love the One You're With" (1986)	"Keep Each Other Warm" (1986)	"Heart of Stone" (1988)

"Keep Each Other Warm" is a 1986 single by Bucks Fizz. The song peaked at No. 45 on the UK Singles Chart in December 1986. It was the fifth and final single from their Writing on the Wall album, which was released at the same time. "Keep Each Other Warm" was co-written by Andy Hill and Peter Sinfield.

The B-side is a song called "Give a Little Love", originally by Albert Hammond and Albert West, which two years later became a top 20 hit by Aswad.

== Reception ==
Number One magazine stated: "Their best effort yet with the new line-up, but set beside the sheer genius of say 'The Land of Make Believe', it doesn't really cut the cake." Smash Hits predicted "Bucks Fizz will find themselves back with a very welcome hit."

== Track listings ==
7"

1. "Keep Each Other Warm" (4.12)
2. "Give a Little Love" (3.30)

12"

1. "Keep Each Other Warm (Long Version)" (5.37)
2. "Give a Little Love (Long Version)" (4.40)

== Barry Manilow version ==
In 1989, "Keep Each Other Warm" was covered by Barry Manilow and released on his self-titled album. Manilow's version was released as a single, reaching No. 7 on the U.S. Billboard Adult Contemporary chart. Cash Box said of Manilow's version, produced by British producer Paul O'Duffy, that "the arrangement of this new toe-tapper is warm, loose and clean at the same time, one of the best things he’s ever done."

=== Charts ===
==== Weekly charts ====
Chart (1989)	Peak position
Italy Airplay (Music & Media)	17
