= Trouble at the Top =

- Country of origin: United Kingdom
- Original language: English
- No. of series: 9

Production
- Running time: 43–44 minutes

Original release
- Network: BBC 2
- Release: 8 January 1997 – 8 February 2005

Trouble at the Top is a business-based BBC television fly on the wall documentary broadcast on BBC2. The series focussed on business failings or disputes between business people. Mainly the series depicted half-hour documentaries on large businesses such as Sainsbury's or privately owned ventures. It also featured a number of celebrity-based editions such as Chef Gordon Ramsay, supermodel Jodie Kidd and pop group Bucks Fizz. The series ran for nine seasons from 8 January 1997 to 8 February 2005.

The 2005 movie Kinky Boots was inspired by an episode about W.J. Brooks Ltd, a family-controlled Earls Barton, Northamptonshire shoe factory whose 'Divine' product line consisted of traditionally feminine footwear marketed towards men.

Trouble at the Top reportedly inspired TV producer Mark Burnett to make The Apprentice, which debuted in the US in 2004.

A spin off four-part series, Trouble at the Big Top, followed developments at the Millennium Dome in a similar style.
