= One of Those Nights (Bucks Fizz song) =

Single by Bucks Fizz

from the album Bucks Fizz
- B-side: "Always Thinking of You"
- Released: 7 August 1981
- Genre: Pop
- Length: 4.26
- Label: RCA
- Songwriters: Steve Glen, Mike Burns, Dave Most
- Producer: Andy Hill

Bucks Fizz singles chronology
"Piece of the Action" (1981)	"One of Those Nights" (1981)	"The Land of Make Believe" (1981)

"One of Those Nights" is a 1981 single by UK pop group Bucks Fizz. Written by Steve Glen, Mike Burns and Dave Most, it was the group's third single and their third UK top 20 hit.

== Background ==
The song was released in August 1981 and was the group's third single, following on from their win at the Eurovision Song Contest earlier in the year. The single reached No.20 in the UK Charts and remained in the top 75 for 10 weeks. "One of Those Nights" featured on the group's debut album, Bucks Fizz, which was released two weeks earlier. In the US and Canada, the song was included on their debut release there in 1982. The Montreal Gazette singled this song out for praise calling it "stunning" and commended its use of "full four-part harmony as its main theme". In 2015 Music-News.com said that it was "classy".

David Van Day of the pop duo, Dollar stated that they were offered the song some months earlier, but declined it. They did however record a demo of the song. In a curious twist, Dollar were at No.19, while this song was at No.20 in the charts.

The song centres around a man who is pining for a former lover who has left him, despite him doing everything he could to please her. "One of Those Nights" was a change of pace for the group, after two upbeat singles, this one was more slow-paced and dramatic. Its lead vocal was performed by member Bobby G. Unlike their other releases, the group didn't record a Promotional Video for this single.

A demo version of this song was released on the 2008 album, The Lost Masters 2 - The Final Cut.

== Track listing ==
1. "One of Those Nights" (Steve Glen / Mike Burns / Dave Most) (4.27)
2. "Always Thinking of You" (Andy Hill / Nichola Martin) (3.51)

== Charts ==
Country	Peak position
UK	20
Austria	6
France	2
Ireland	29
