= Now Those Days Are Gone =

Single by Bucks Fizz

from the album Are You Ready
- B-side: "Takin' Me Higher"
- Released: 6 June 1982
- Genre: Pop
- Length: 3.33
- Label: RCA
- Songwriters: Andy Hill, Nichola Martin
- Producer: Andy Hill

Bucks Fizz singles chronology
"My Camera Never Lies" (1982)	"Now Those Days Are Gone" (1982)	"If You Can't Stand the Heat" (1982)

"Now Those Days Are Gone" is a single by UK pop group Bucks Fizz. It became a UK top ten hit in July 1982 and featured on the group's album Are You Ready. The song was nominated for an Ivor Novello award the following year.

== Overview ==
=== Background ===
Written by Andy Hill and Nichola Martin and produced by Hill, this was the group's only single to feature member Mike Nolan on lead vocals, it was also the last to be co-written by Martin, who founded the group. The song was a stark contrast to the group's singles up to this point, which had all featured very full pop productions, this time, the song was partly an a cappella piece with soft harmonies and a gentle orchestral build towards the end. Years later, Nolan commented on the recording of the song saying that he favoured another ballad from the album called "Love Dies Hard" but it had already been given to other male member Bobby G. The vocal harmonies were very intricate and took many takes to get right in the studio. When the album was finished, Hill invited record company executives to listen to the tracks and at the close of this song there was a round of applause where they instantly decided this would be the next single, much to Nolan's delight. One reviewer remarked that the impressive vocal structure would give Bucks Fizz some much-needed credibility.

The song centres around the narrator who looks back on younger days and recalls how innocent he was then, and reflects on the love he once felt for his partner. The promotional video for the song saw the group in a World War II setting, with Nolan as a radio singer and members Bobby G, Cheryl Baker and Jay Aston being caught in a love triangle. Much of the video was filmed in Hyde Park, London. Nolan's scenes were completely studio bound, meaning that he finished the shoot early while the other three were filmed on location. Baker recalls that while walking along the Serpentine lake, Bobby G was attacked by a group of swans and had to be rescued. The single sleeve's cover shot was taken at the group's publicist, Jenny Halsall's manor house in Cambridge.

=== Release and reception ===
Released in June 1982, this single followed up two No.1 hits, "My Camera Never Lies" and "The Land Of Make Believe" and reached No.8 in the UK Charts. It remained on the chart for nine weeks and earned a silver disc for sales of over 250,000. It performed even better in Ireland, where it reached No.5. The following year, "Now Those Days Are Gone" received an Ivor Novello nomination for best song of 1982 - an award Andy Hill would go on to win years later with Celine Dion's "Think Twice". In 2015, Guardian journalist Bob Stanley commented favourably on the song saying "Now Those Days Are Gone sounded out of place at the time, a mid-70s ballad transplanted into the summer of 'Come on Eileen', but with its long a cappella sections, aching string part and Mike Nolan’s androgynous, weeping lead, it was home counties, potting-shed balladry of the highest order".

In Australia and many European countries, this single went unreleased, with tracks, "Are You Ready" or "Easy Love" being released in its place. The song was featured on the group's second (and most popular) album, Are You Ready. It was also later featured as the B-side to "You and Your Heart so Blue" - a 1985 single by the group. The B-side to "Now Those Days Are Gone", "Takin' Me Higher" was a first, in that it was written and produced by the group themselves. The group continued to write and produce songs for their B-sides over the next few years.

A newly recorded version of "Now Those Days Are Gone" was released in 2006 on the Bucks Fizz album, The Lost Masters, while an early demo by Hill was released in 2008 on The Lost Masters 2 - The Final Cut. This demo featured an expletive, which necessitated the album to include a parental advisory sticker.

== Track listing ==
1. "Now Those Days Are Gone" (Andy Hill / Nichola Martin) (3.33)
2. "Takin' Me Higher" (Bucks Fizz) (3.46)

== Chart positions ==
Country	Peak position
UK	8
Ireland	5
