= New Beginning (Bucks Fizz song) =

"New Beginning (Mamba Seyra)"

Single by Bucks Fizz

from the album Writing on the Wall
- B-side: "In Your Eyes"
- Released: 30 May 1986
- Recorded: January – February 1986
- Genre: Pop
- Length: 4.03
- Label: Polydor
- Songwriters: Mike Myers, Tony Gibber
- Producers: Mike Myers, Andy Hill

Bucks Fizz singles chronology
"Magical" (1985)	"New Beginning (Mamba Seyra)" (1986)	"Love the One You're With" (1986)

"New Beginning (Mamba Seyra)" (often referred to as simply "New Beginning") is a song by UK pop group Bucks Fizz. It was released as a single in 1986 (their first release on Polydor Records) and was a comeback hit, achieving their highest chart placing for four years.

== Overview ==
=== Background ===
The song was written by Mike Myers and Tony Gibber and was produced by Myers along with the group's regular producer Andy Hill. According to the group, the recording of the song took an unusually long time due to the vocal tracks. As well as the group recording their vocals repeatedly, there was also a children's choir and gospel choir used on the track. The musicians in the studio also were used on distant back-up vocals. Member Cheryl Baker remembers one version where Hill instructed them to deliberately sing out of tune, which she found difficult. Many of the vocals were recorded at the newly opened Terminal 24 studios in South London due to its distinctive vocal acoustics. The original mix of the song was completed in February 1986.

"New Beginning" (as it is very often more simply referred) was originally recorded a year earlier by Force 8. The theme of the song is one of hope where the narrator talks about building a happier world, with some parts of the song sung in Swahili and Spanish. The video for the single depicts the group performing the song in a Metropolis-type setting backed by dancers and drummers - due to the heavy drum sound on the track.

=== Release and reception ===
The song was released in May 1986 and was seen as a comeback single as it was their first release in eight months and featured new member Shelley Preston who had replaced Jay Aston a year earlier. It was also their first release on new record label, Polydor after their five-year contract with RCA had finished. The song was notable for its full and lavish production and multi-layered vocal work and received much praise from critics as well as becoming very popular on radio. Number One magazine said it was another "pop epic by Andy Hill". The song became a big hit in the Summer of 1986. After entering at No.55, the song rose sharply to No.24 becoming instantly their biggest hit for three years. Two weeks later the single entered the top 10 at number eight where it stayed the following week. The song remained on the charts for 10 weeks and became the 93rd biggest-seller of the year. "New Beginning" achieved their highest chart position for four years, but was also their last top 40 hit. The group promoted the song on several television shows including Top of the Pops, which Preston recalls as being embarrassing as her costume went missing. While the rest of the group wore the clothes from the videos shoot she was given a very slight leotard to wear. Ultimately she covered herself up with a long-tailed jacket borrowed from a friend.

"New Beginning" was followed up by a cover of the Stephen Stills song "Love The One You're With" and featured on the group's final studio album, Writing on the Wall, which was released at the end of the year. Several versions of the song have been released. The album version differed slightly from the 7" mix in that member Bobby G features prominently on backing vocals at the end - a version that was used in the video. As well as this, two 12" singles were released: one with an extended version of the song, the other an extended mix by dance producer Ian Levine. On the Writing on the Wall CD re-issue in 2004, a largely instrumental extended version of the song was included as a bonus track. The song remains among the group's most highly regarded work.

== Track listing ==
7"

1. "New Beginning (Mamba Seyra)" (4.03)
2. "In Your Eyes" (4.19)

12"

1. "New Beginning (Mamba Seyra) (extended version)" (7.30)
2. "In Your Eyes" (4.19)
3. "I Need Your Love" (4.40)

2nd 12"

1. "New Beginning (Mamba Seyra) (as "New") (Ian Levine remix)" (9.24)
2. "In Your Eyes" (4.19)
3. "I Need Your Love" (4.40)

3rd 12"

1. "New Beginning (Mamba Seyra) (Ian Levine remix)" (9.24)
2. "New Beginning (Mamba Seyra) (Ian Levine remix - Dub version)" (8.23)
3. "New Beginning (Mamba Seyra)" (4.03)

== Charts ==
Country	Peak position
UK	8
Ireland	11
The Netherlands	24
Belgium	22
