= Heart of Stone (Bucks Fizz song) =

1988 single by Bucks Fizz

Single by Bucks Fizz

from the album The Story So Far
- B-side: "Here's Looking at You"
- Released: 24 October 1988
- Recorded: October 1988
- Genre: Pop
- Length: 4:22
- Label: RCA
- Songwriters: Andy Hill; Pete Sinfield
- Producer: Andy Hill

Bucks Fizz singles chronology
"Keep Each Other Warm" (1986)	"Heart of Stone" (1988)

"Heart of Stone" is a song written by Andy Hill and Pete Sinfield for the band Bucks Fizz in 1988, and recorded by the band at Abbey Road Studios in London. The following year it was recorded by Cher as the title track of her album of the same name.

== Bucks Fizz version ==
"Heart of Stone" was originally recorded by Bucks Fizz and released as a single in 1988. It was the group's 20th single and their last one to chart, reaching number 50 on the UK Singles Chart in November 1988. The single was accompanied by a Promotional video of the group performing the song inside and outside of a country mansion. The mansion was owned by Robin Gibb of the Bee Gees who claimed that his house was haunted by the ghost of a gardener who enjoys playing pranks on the Gibb family. As a reference to this, a gardener was fleetingly seen in some shots.

Soon after this, the group released The Story so Far, a greatest hits album, which featured "Heart of Stone" as the only new track (at a shortened 3:58). Bucks Fizz recorded several other songs at this time, but due to the low chart position of this single, went unreleased until they were unearthed for a compilation album of unreleased Bucks Fizz songs, The Lost Masters in 2006. Member Cheryl Baker later recorded a lead vocal for the track which was also included on The Lost Masters collection. Journalist Mark Frith said that the song was "a gutsy pop classic".

=== Track listing ===
- 7-inch single
1. "Heart of Stone" (4.22)
2. "Here's Looking at You" (5.49)
- 12-inch single
1. "Heart of Stone" (4.29)
2. "Here's Looking at You" (5.49)
3. "My Camera Never Lies" (3.43)

== Cher version ==
"Heart of Stone"

Single by Cher

from the album Heart of Stone
- B-side: "All Because of You"
- Released: 23 January 1990
- Genre: Pop
- Length: 4:18 (album version); 3:50 (radio edit)
- Label: Geffen
- Songwriters: Andy Hill; Pete Sinfield
- Producer: Peter Asher

Cher singles chronology
"Just Like Jesse James" (1989)	"Heart of Stone" (1990)	"You Wouldn't Know Love" (1990)

Music video
- "Heart of Stone" on YouTube

"Heart of Stone"
The song was described by Billboard as being "an acoustic-powered rocker."

"Heart of Stone" served as the fourth North American and third European single release from American singer and actress Cher's 19th studio album, Heart of Stone (1989). The music video shows Cher in a dark room with old clips of herself projected onto screens in the background. It was shot in the first week of 1990. It entered the top 20 in the United States and barely missed the top 40 in the UK. In reaching the top 20 in the United States, Cher was the first female artist to land a Billboard Hot 100 hit in four decades or more.

=== Critical reception ===
Bill Coleman from Billboard wrote, "Fave track from diva's current platinum opus is an acoustic-powered rocker destined to follow the top 10 success of its predecessors." The Daily Vault's Mark Millan named "Heart of Stone" one of Cher's "finest moments to date", adding, "The lyrics are a tad confusing because it's half social commentary and half autobiographical, but it's a great soulful pop song." Terry Staunton from NME said, "Cher is living proof that a dual acting/singing career can work", deeming the track far superior to the "dreary" "Just Like Jesse James". He also remarked that Peter Asher's production "bubbles and squeaks with excitement", a quality he found missing in Asher's more recent production work.

=== Live performances ===
Cher performed the song on the following concert tours:

- Heart of Stone Tour (omitted from some dates)
- Do You Believe? Tour (dropped from the show's setlist after the first few shows)
- The Farewell Tour (sung on the first leg, the second leg and the final two shows of the tour)
- Dressed to Kill Tour (omitted from some dates)

=== Track listing ===
- US 7-inch single
1. "Heart of Stone" (Heartbeat version – faded) – 4:01
2. "All Because of You" – 3:29
- US cassette single
1. "Heart of Stone" (CHR version) – 3:50
2. "All Because of You" – 3:29
- European 7-inch and cassette single
1. "Heart of Stone" (remix) – 4:16
2. "All Because of You" – 3:30
- European 12-inch and CD single
1. "Heart of Stone" (remix) – 4:16
2. "All Because of You" – 3:30
3. "Working Girl" – 3:57

=== Personnel ===
- Cher – vocals
- Robbie Buchanan, Jon Gilutin – keyboards
- Michael Landau, Waddy Wachtel – guitars
- Andrew Gold – acoustic guitar, 12-string guitar, backing vocals
- Leland Sklar – bass
- Carlos Vega – drums
- Michael Fisher – percussion
- Peter Blakeley, Wendy Matthews – backing vocals

=== Charts ===
Weekly chart performance for "Heart of Stone"
Chart (1990)	Peak position
Australia (ARIA)	70
Canada Top Singles (RPM)	26
Canada Adult Contemporary (RPM)	31
Ireland (IRMA)	24
Israel (IBA)	30
UK Singles (Official Charts)	43
US Billboard Hot 100	20
US Adult Contemporary (Billboard)	30
US Cash Box Top 100	19

=== Release history ===
Region	Date	Format(s)	Label(s)	Ref.
United States	23 January 1990	7-inch vinyl; cassette	Geffen	
Australia	29 January 1990	7-inch vinyl; cassette	Geffen	
United Kingdom	26 March 1990	7-inch vinyl; 12-inch vinyl; CD; cassette	Geffen	
