= Peter Sinfield =

English poet and songwriter (1943–2024)

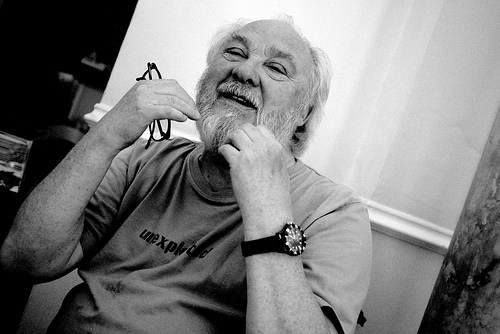
- Sinfield in 2010

Background information
- Born: Peter John Sinfield; 27 December 1943; Fulham, London, England
- Died: 14 November 2024 (aged 80)
- Genres: Progressive rock; art rock
- Occupations: Lyricist; songwriter; musician; record producer
- Instruments: Vocals; guitar; synthesizers
- Years active: 1960s–2024
- Labels: Manticore; E.G.; EMI
- Formerly of: King Crimson
- Website: songsouponsea.com

Peter John Sinfield (27 December 1943 – 14 November 2024) was an English poet and songwriter. He was best known as a co-founder and lyricist of King Crimson. Their debut album In the Court of the Crimson King is considered one of the first and most influential progressive rock albums ever released.

Sinfield's lyrics are known for their surreal imagery, often involving common fantasy concepts, nature, or the sea. They often also deal with emotional concepts and, sometimes, storyline concepts. Later in his career, he adapted his songwriting to better suit pop music, and wrote a number of successful songs for artists such as Celine Dion, Cher, Cliff Richard, Leo Sayer, Five Star, and Bucks Fizz.

Paul Stump, in his 1997 History of Progressive Rock, called Sinfield "the premier littérateur of Progressive". In 2005, Sinfield was referred to as a "prog rock hero" in Q magazine for his lyrical work and influence in the music industry.

== Early life ==
Sinfield was born in Fulham, London, to mixed English-Irish ancestry and a bohemian activist mother Deidre (also known as Joey or Daphne). He seldom had contact with his father Ian. Up until the age of eight, he was raised largely by his mother's German housekeeper Maria Wallenda, a high wire walker from the circus act the Flying Wallendas, after which he was sent to Danes Hill School in Oxshott. It was there that Sinfield discovered a love of words and their uses and meanings, with the guidance of his tutor John Mawson. He began to read literature of all kinds, particularly poetry. He later attended Ranelagh Grammar School in Bracknell, Berkshire. He left school at sixteen and worked briefly as a travel agent, believing that this would "allow him to see the world".

After his stint as a travel agent, Sinfield secured a job in the computer industry. To compete with his art school friends, Sinfield learned to play the guitar. He wrote poetry beginning in the mid 1960s and made a living on market stalls selling handmade kites, lampshades, paintings and customised clothing. Sinfield spent a number of years drifting around Morocco and Spain before returning to England. In 1967, he formed the Creation (which was not the '60s British band with the same name), a band he said he envisioned as a cross between Donovan and the Who. One of the members, Ian McDonald, convinced Sinfield to switch from singer/guitarist to lyricist.

== King Crimson ==
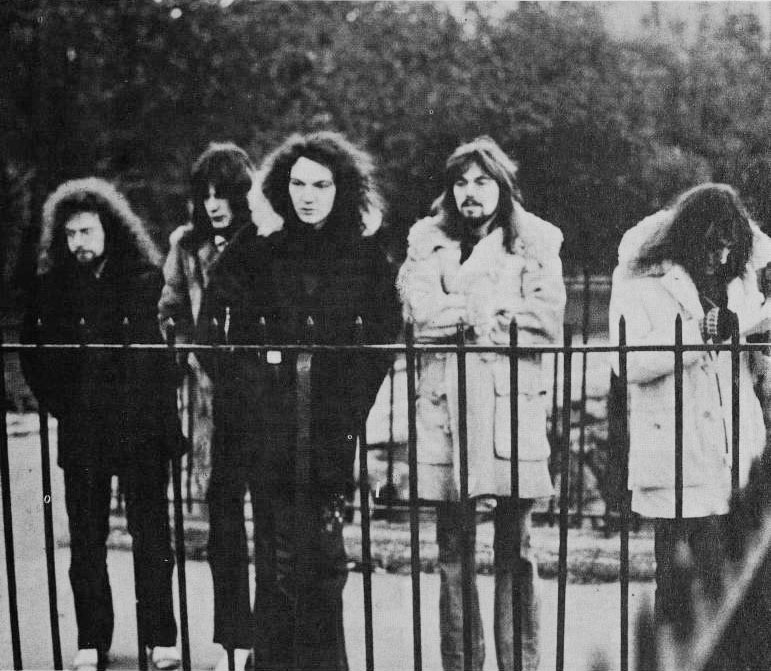
Sinfield (far right) with King Crimson in 1972.

In 1968, Ian McDonald joined Giles, Giles and Fripp, a progressive pop trio consisting of Michael Giles, Peter Giles, and Robert Fripp, who were looking to do more with music than their three-man line-up could manage. McDonald let the others know that he was already working with someone who could write lyrics. In their primordial form, Giles, Giles & Fripp, augmented by McDonald and ex-Fairport Convention vocalist Judy Dyble, recorded an early version of the McDonald-Sinfield song "I Talk to the Wind", which later became part of King Crimson's repertoire.

Peter Giles left the group at about this time, to be replaced by Greg Lake, and Sinfield joined around the same time. In his own words, "I became their pet hippie, because I could tell them where to go to buy the funny clothes that they saw everyone wearing". Sinfield also came up with the name King Crimson. Sinfield loved working with the band and, in addition to writing the phantasmagorical lyrics that came to be part of King Crimson's trademark, he also ran the group's light-show and mixed the sound at their concerts, and offered advice on artwork, album design, and other details of the band's releases. Sinfield also introduced the band to Barry Godber, who would end up painting the artwork for their first studio album, In the Court of the Crimson King. Sinfield's performance role in the band was limited to occasionally producing sound effects using an EMS VCS 3 synthesizer.

Fripp became involved with other projects including production work for Septober Energy and Matching Mole's Little Red Record, which left Sinfield with much of the responsibility for the final version and design of Islands including the album jacket. The relationship between Sinfield and Fripp became increasingly strained as the band progressed. On their fourth album, Islands, Sinfield began exploring new lyrical territory, with more sexual imagery juxtaposed with the languidly surreal title track. On 1 January 1972, following a tour of the United States, Fripp told Sinfield he could no longer work with him and asked him to leave the group.

== ELP, PFM, and Still ==
In 1972, Sinfield, associated with E.G. Records, which represented King Crimson and Roxy Music, was producing Roxy Music's debut album and their hit single "Virginia Plain". It was during this time that he first decided to venture into recording a solo album. In 1973, he wrote English lyrics for the Italian group Premiata Forneria Marconi (PFM) and produced their first album for Emerson, Lake & Palmer (ELP)'s Manticore Records, titled Photos of Ghosts (1973), as well as the follow-up, The World Became the World (1975).

In 1973, Sinfield formed a band provisionally called A Bowl of Soup and featuring Phil Jump on keyboards, Richard Brunton on guitar, Allan "Min" Mennie on drums, Steve Dolan on bass, and Sinfield himself on vocals, guitar, and synthesizer. They were booked to record an album at Command Studios. This album, Still, was ultimately credited as a Pete Sinfield solo album, and in addition to the five members of A Bowl of Soup it featured input from numerous former (Greg Lake, Mel Collins, Ian Wallace), and future (John Wetton) members of King Crimson. In the song "Envelopes of yesterday", Sinfield settles some scores with his former musical partner Robert Fripp, who had just ousted him from King Crimson. While working on Still, he was approached by Emerson, Lake & Palmer, who needed a lyricist of Sinfield's calibre. Sinfield put it more bluntly: "Greg [Lake] called me. 'I need help with the lyrics.' And, boy, did he need help." Still was originally released on ELP's own Manticore label in 1973, but Sinfield found himself subsumed into Emerson, Lake & Palmer. Already having a fear of the stage which he had little time to overcome due to writing demands, his solo career was put on hold and he worked with ELP for the next few years.

During this time, Sinfield lived with his first wife Stephanie in The Mill House, Surrey, which was loaned to him by ELP. Due to poorly negotiated agreements regarding his future copyrights, Sinfield was unable to complete his purchase of the country house he had dreamed of. His neighbour, then, was Gary Brooker of Procol Harum, with whom he co-wrote five songs on Brooker's first solo album No More Fear of Flying. He also released a book containing his previous lyrics and poems titled Under the Sky (named after one of the lyrics from Still). In 1975, "I Believe in Father Christmas", a song co-written with Greg Lake was released, reaching No. 2 in the UK charts. "C'est la Vie", from the album Works Volume 1 and written by Lake and Sinfield, reached No. 75 in Canada, October 15, 1977.

== Ibiza years ==
After overestimating his wealth and underestimating his percentage of royalties from ELP, he moved to Ibiza to live as a tax exile, and enjoyed his first interruption from continual work in the music industry. There he met a circle of artists, actors, painters, and members of the Chelsea Arts Club such as Peter Unsworth and Barry Flanagan, and eventually parted from his first wife. During his time in Ibiza, Sinfield's break from songwriting allowed him to spend his time travelling, socialising, and reflecting, which he had been unable to do for the previous decade.

During the late 1970s, he continued to move in communities around Spain. In 1978, following the success of his previous lyrics for Emerson, Lake & Palmer, Sinfield was asked by ELP to produce lyrics for their album Love Beach, now regarded by many (including Sinfield himself) to be the weakest of all ELP's albums. In 1978 he also narrated Robert Sheckley's In a Land of Clear Colours, an audio sci-fi story released the following year on a limited edition of 1000 vinyl records. The backing music for the story was provided by Brian Eno, with whom Sinfield had previously worked while producing Roxy Music. By the time he returned to London in 1980, with his new Spanish wife (a model and runner-up for Miss Spain), he discovered that progressive rock music was no longer in demand, and that punk had emerged in the UK.

Sinfield also wrote the lyrics, in 1978–1980, for the English versions of Alla fiera dell'est (Highdown Fair) and La pulce d'acqua (Fables and Fantasies), by Italian singer-songwriter Angelo Branduardi and, in 1981–1983, for "It's Your Dream" (Nikka Costa), "My First Love", "I Believe in Fairy Tales", and "Trick or Treat" (Fairy Tales), by the American child singer Nikka Costa.

== Pop years ==
Upon his return to London in 1980, his publisher introduced him to Andy Hill, a composer and fellow songwriter. He and Sinfield collaborated on such hits as "The Land of Make Believe" by Bucks Fizz, which reached No. 1 in the UK Singles Chart, and became one of the biggest-selling hits of the decade. While re-educating himself to adapt to the pop music industry with the help of Hill, he returned to Spain, where he was already established in the communities within Ibiza and Barcelona, and as his career progressed, moved into a house in Mallorca. At this time, he appeared on Spanish television programme Musical Express, where he was interviewed and performed a set with Boz Burrell, Tim Hinkley, Michael Giles, Bobby Tench, Mel Collins, and Gary Brooker.

In the United Kingdom, he continued to release hits with Hill, including "I Hear Talk" by Bucks Fizz and "Have You Ever Been in Love" by Leo Sayer (which they wrote with John Danter). He also co-wrote Five Star's "Rain or Shine" with Billy Livsey. After divorcing his wife and leaving Mallorca, he returned to the United Kingdom around 1990 to a flat in Holland Park and continued to write lyrics for popular music. In 1993, he re-released his solo album as Stillusion. In the same year, he and Hill released "Think Twice" by Celine Dion, which went on to become a massive hit and won an Ivor Novello Award for "Best Song Musically and Lyrically". Sinfield and Hill had also won an Ivor Novello a decade previously for the Leo Sayer track, "Have You Ever Been in Love".

== Haiku ==
There had been rumours of a second solo album, and Sinfield worked on it for a couple of years with vibraphone player and programmer Poli Palmer, formerly of Family. It was always a challenging project, made more so by Sinfield's quadruple bypass operation in 2005. After a period of convalescence, Sinfield attempted to restart the project, but it failed to take off.

During this time Sinfield wrote an increasing number of haiku. After his appearance at the Genoa Poetry Festival at the Ducal Palace in June 2010, he turned his creative energies more towards poetry.

Sinfield was active as a writer and appeared in the 2009 BBC documentary Prog Rock Britannia: An Observation in Three Movements.

== Personal life and death ==
Sinfield lived in Aldeburgh, Suffolk. He was active within the songwriting community and was a member of the British Academy of Songwriters, Composers and Authors committee. He underwent heart surgery in 2005.

Sinfield died on 14 November 2024, at the age of 80.

== Influences ==
Sinfield had a fairly unusual and colourful upbringing, being an only child (bar his adopted brother, Dennis) of a bisexual mother who ran a hair salon and one of the first burger bars in London in the 1950s. He grew up in a bohemian household, and claims to have vivid memories of extravagant and wonderful Christmases, later inspiring the lyrics for his hit "I Believe in Father Christmas", which recalled a lost and naive faith in Father Christmas. Sinfield said that A Poet's Notebook by Edith Sitwell had an important influence on his writing, as well as the works of Arthur Rimbaud, Paul Verlaine, William Blake, Kahlil Gibran, and Shakespeare.

Musically he was largely influenced by Bob Dylan and Donovan. Hearing Donovan's opening line of "Colours": "Yellow is the colour of my true love's hair"' was, Sinfield stated, the defining moment when he decided he had the desire and ability to start writing songs.

== Discography ==
=== Solo ===
- Still (1973) – vocals, twelve-string guitar, synthesizer, production, cover design (re-released in 1993 as Stillusion)

=== With King Crimson ===
- In the Court of the Crimson King (1969) – lyrics, production
- In the Wake of Poseidon (1970) – lyrics, production
- Lizard (1970) – lyrics, VCS3, production
- Islands (1971) – lyrics, production
- Sailors' Tales 1970–1972, 27-disc boxed set (2017) – lyrics, production, live sound mix

=== With Emerson, Lake & Palmer ===
- Brain Salad Surgery (1973) – lyrics for "Benny the Bouncer" and "Karn Evil 9 3rd Impression"
- Works Volume I (1977) – lyrics
- Works Volume 2 (1977) – lyrics for "Watching Over You", and "I Believe in Father Christmas"
- Love Beach (1978) – lyrics

=== Others ===
McDonald and Giles

- McDonald and Giles (1970) – lyrics and concept for "Birdman"

Roxy Music

- Roxy Music (1972) – production

Premiata Forneria Marconi

- Photos of Ghosts (1973) – production, lyrics
- The World Became the World (1974) – production, lyrics

Angelo Branduardi

- Highdown Fair (1978) – lyrics
- Fables and Fantasies (1980) – lyrics

With Robert Sheckley and Brian Eno

- In a Land of Clear Colours (1978) – narration

Gary Brooker

- No More Fear of Flying (1979) – lyrics

Chris Squire and Alan White

- "Run with the Fox" (1981) – lyrics

Nikka Costa

- The 1st Album (1981) – lyrics for "It's Your Dream"
- Fairy Tales (1983) – lyrics for "My First Love", "I Believe in Fairy Tales", and "Trick or Treat"

Bucks Fizz

- The 1st Album (1981) – lyrics
- Are You Ready (1982) – lyrics
- I Hear Talk (1984) – lyrics
- Writing on the Wall (1986) – lyrics
- The Story So Far (1988) – lyrics for – "20th Century Hero"

Moon Martin (1982) and TKA (1988)

- "X-Ray Vision" – lyrics

Leo Sayer

- Have You Ever Been in Love (1983) – lyrics

Five Star

- Silk & Steel (1986) – lyrics

Flairck

- Sleight of Hand (1987) – lyrics for "Walk Upon Dreams"

Agnetha Fältskog

- I Stand Alone (1987) – lyrics for "Love in a World Gone Mad"

Cher

- Heart of Stone (1989) – lyrics for the title track

Celine Dion

- The Colour of My Love (1993) – lyrics for "Think Twice"
- Falling into You (1996) – lyrics for "Call the Man"

David Cross

- Exiles (1997) – lyrics for "This Is Your Life"

Ian McDonald

- Drivers Eyes (1999) − lyrics for "Let There Be Light"
