= Piece of the Action =

Single by Bucks Fizz

from the album Bucks Fizz
- B-side: "Took It to the Limit"
- Released: 16 May 1981
- Genre: Pop
- Length: 3.38
- Label: RCA Records
- Songwriter: Andy Hill
- Producer: Andy Hill

Bucks Fizz singles chronology
"Making Your Mind Up" (1981)	"Piece of the Action" (1981)	"One of Those Nights" (1981)

"Piece of the Action" is the second single by pop group Bucks Fizz, the follow-up to the Eurovision-winning song "Making Your Mind Up". It was released in May 1981 and became a UK top 20 hit.

== Overview ==
Following the group's success at the Eurovision Song Contest, their record company, who had signed them for an album deal, were keen to release a follow-up single. "Piece of the Action" had already been recorded by the group prior to the contest and was seen as the perfect pop vehicle to move them away from the style of "Making Your Mind Up". Bill Kimber, executive with RCA Records, was keen to see Bucks Fizz continue successfully, as he later recalled;

"One thing that happens with Eurovision groups is that they have one single as a result of the contest and then they quickly throw out another single which isn't good enough and everybody forgets them. With Bucks Fizz we worked very hard to get a song that was strong and had good value radio-wise, commercially and was well-produced."

He and Andy Hill, the producer went through a number of songs, eventually deciding on "Piece of the Action". The recording was completed by 24 April at Mayfair Studios in London and was struck onto master tape along with the B-side "Took It to the Limit" and album track "Getting Kinda Lonely". The single was released on 17 May 1981 and reached number 12 during a nine-week run in the UK charts and was certified silver. As a Eurovision-winning follow-up, this was the highest chart placing ever achieved by an artist in the UK, the contest being notorious for producing one-hit wonders. The single also became a hit around Europe as well as in Australia and New Zealand.

The song's lyrics concern a man who is desperate to gain the attention of a woman to be a part of her exciting life. The promotional video of the song features the group in a variety of outfits and performing the routine in a night club-like setting. Much thought was put into the image for the group at this time, with the group's creator Nichola Martin deciding on khaki, rather than jeans or leather as it was not so obvious and was currently in fashion. They wore this for the night club scenes in the video and also for their soon-to-be-released-album cover.

The song was written and produced by Andy Hill and was the opening track on their first album, Bucks Fizz. A demo version of the song was later uncovered and included on the group's 2008 compilation, The Lost Masters 2 - The Final Cut.

"Piece of the Action" was covered by the Bay City Rollers in 1983 as a Japanese-only single release.

== Track listing ==
1. "Piece of the Action" (Andy Hill) (3.38)
2. "Took it to the Limit" (Andy Hill / Nichola Martin) (3.46)

== Charts ==
Country	Peak position
Australia	26
Austria	11
Belgium	19
Germany	35
Ireland	11
The Netherlands	26
New Zealand	31
UK	12
