= Bucks Fizz =

English pop group

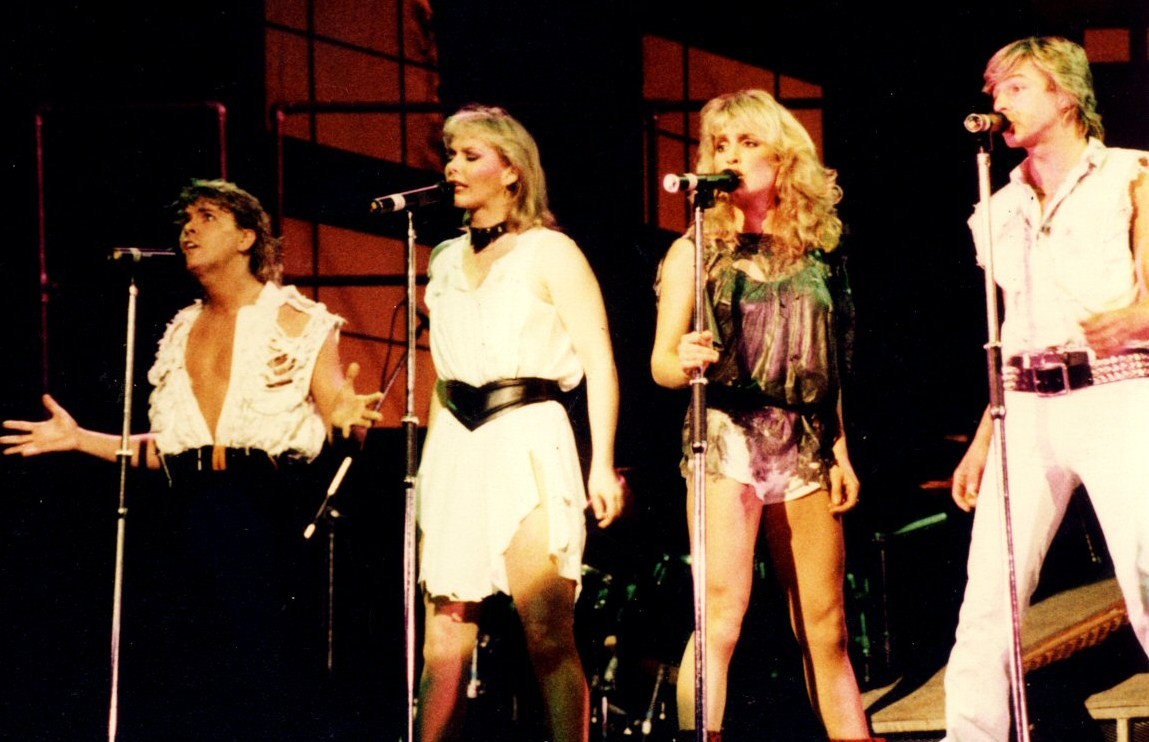
- Bucks Fizz performing in 1984

Background information
- Origin: United Kingdom
- Genres: Pop; pop rock; MOR; AOR
- Years active: 1981–present
- Labels: RCA; Polydor; Sony; BMG
- Spinoffs: The Fizz
- Members: Bobby G; Tammy Choat; Wayne Chinnery; Jenny Phillips
- Past members: Mike Nolan; Cheryl Baker; Jay Aston; Shelley Preston; Amanda Szwarc; Heidi Manton; David Van Day; Karen Logan; Louise Hart; Graham Crisp; Nikki Winter; Ben Greenhow; Paul Yates; Sally Jacks

Bucks Fizz are an English pop group that achieved success in the 1980s, most notably for winning the Eurovision Song Contest 1981 with the song "Making Your Mind Up". The group was formed in January 1981 specifically for the contest and comprised four vocalists: Bobby G, Cheryl Baker, Mike Nolan and Jay Aston. They received attention for the dance routine which accompanied the song, in which the male members of the group ripped the female members' outer skirts off to reveal much shorter mini-skirts beneath (in line with the part of the lyrics "...if you want to see some more"). The group went on to have a successful career around the world (although they were commercially unsuccessful in the United States), but the UK remained their biggest market, where they had three No.1 singles with "Making Your Mind Up" (1981), "The Land of Make Believe" (1981) and "My Camera Never Lies" (1982) and became one of the top-selling groups of the 1980s. They also had UK Top 10 hits with "Now Those Days Are Gone" (1982), "If You Can't Stand the Heat" (1982), "When We Were Young" (1983) and "New Beginning (Mamba Seyra)" (1986).

The line-up of the group has changed a number of times over the years, most famously the first change when Jay Aston quit the group in 1985 and was replaced by Shelley Preston. Bobby G's official version of Bucks Fizz has been almost inactive since 2018, while another group, the Fizz, continues with other Bucks Fizz alumni.

== Career ==
=== Formation ===
In late 1980, Nichola Martin and Andy Hill sought to create a new group to enter their song "Making Your Mind Up" in the Eurovision Song Contest. The first member to be recruited was Mike Nolan, who was known to Martin. Nolan initially refused the offer, having just finished with another band Brooks and was reluctant to join another band so soon, but agreed to add vocals to the recording. Together, they recorded a demo of the song and entered it for inclusion in A Song for Europe – the preliminary heats for the contest. Realising that a name was needed for the performing artists, Martin quickly decided on Buck's Fizz, as it was her favourite drink. Once the song made it to the final, Martin persuaded him to sign a contract that would only hold until the end of March, since she didn't think that the song had much chance of getting as far as Eurovision. In January, Martin contacted Cheryl Baker to join them, as he remembered her from the 1978 Eurovision group, Co-Co. Concurrent to this, Martin was holding auditions for another male vocalist and female vocalist, should Baker turn down the position (which she didn't). At the end of these auditions, Martin had found a male singer, Stephen Fischer and female, Jay Aston. Unsure of which female vocalist to use, she ultimately decided to use both Baker and Aston as she felt their vocals complemented each other and Martin stepped down from the group in order to team up with Hill for another line-up as they had two songs in the competition. Fischer then became unavailable as he was appearing in a musical at the time and Martin hired another auditionee, Bobby G for the group. The four members came together for the first time on 11 January 1981. Jill Shirley, with whom Martin had been in a group called Rags who had appeared in the 1977 A Song for Europe contest (placing fourth), agreed to manage the group.

=== Eurovision ===
The skirt rip at Eurovision 1981

During rehearsals, a dance routine was devised for the song which went on to become famous for the moment where the girls' skirts are ripped off halfway through – only to reveal shorter skirts underneath (in line with the part of the lyrics "... when you see some more"). The routine itself was choreographed by Chrissie Wickham, a former member of dance troupe Hot Gossip, although Martin, Baker and Aston have all since laid claim to the skirt-rip idea, Martin had used a similar idea when Rags had taken part in the earlier A Song for Europe contest in 1977; subsequently performing the same routine on Top of the Pops after failing to win the competition.

On 11 March, A Song for Europe took place with the then unknown Bucks Fizz competing against well-known act Liquid Gold, as well as Hill and Martin's own group, Gem. "Making Your Mind Up" became an easy winner and the group recorded the song with Hill as producer. Later in the month it was released as a single and entered the charts at No. 24. By the time the contest was staged, the single had risen to No. 2.

On 4 April, Bucks Fizz represented United Kingdom in the Eurovision Song Contest 1981, which was held in Dublin. Although they were favourites to win, the song faced stiff competition, and early votes were poor. Halfway through the voting process, Bucks Fizz took the lead, although they remained close throughout. Ultimately, Bucks Fizz won the contest by a margin of four points, beating Germany into second place. "Making Your Mind Up" became a major hit around the continent, reaching No. 1 in the UK as well as eight other countries. It charted highly in other countries such as Australia, eventually selling four million copies worldwide.

=== Post-Eurovision success ===
With Shirley remaining as the group's manager, Hill as producer and Martin as co-songwriter, they worked with record company A&R head Bill Kimber to continue the group's success, determined that they would not become another Eurovision one-hit wonder. A follow-up single was recorded amid promotional tours and the group's image was revamped. In May, the single "Piece of the Action" was released. The song boasted a contemporary pop sound and high production values, in contrast to the rock and roll style of "Making Your Mind Up". As Baker has stated: "Our follow-up single was nothing at all like 'Making Your Mind Up', it was a good, strong, contemporary pop song". "Piece of the Action" became an immediate hit and quickly rose to No. 12 in the UK charts. It also charted highly across Europe. Buoyed by this success, the group launched into recording their debut album for RCA Records with producer Andy Hill. Released in July, the self-titled album also became a top 20 hit in the UK charts, as did their third single, "One of Those Nights". In November 1981, Bucks Fizz represented the UK at the World Popular Song Festival in Tokyo, where they achieved the "Best Song Award" and fifth place overall with their song "Another Night". The song was released as a single there and went on to be included on their second album.

=== Continued popularity (1981–1984) ===
In late 1981, Andy Hill, along with former King Crimson member Peter Sinfield, wrote the fourth Bucks Fizz single. Titled "The Land of Make Believe", the song was produced by Hill and featured a strong melody. Released in November, it hit the charts and by Christmas was in the top five. In January 1982, it overtook the Human League's "Don't You Want Me" to reach No.1. It stayed there for two weeks and remained in the UK charts for 16 weeks, becoming the group's best-selling single and one of the top-selling singles of the decade. It also reached No. 1 in the Netherlands and Ireland and became the group's best-selling single in Germany. The song has since been hailed as a 1980s classic and is regarded as the group's best song by some critics.

Early in 1982, the group were awarded 'best group' at the Daily Mirror Rock and Pop awards ceremony and received a nomination at the Brit Awards. In March they released their fifth single, "My Camera Never Lies", which swiftly climbed the charts and became their third number-one single. With this they became the first British group of the 1980s to score three number ones within a year. Further success followed in May with the group's second studio album, Are You Ready, which went Gold and became their first top-ten album. This album received particularly good reviews, including a 10-out-of-10 rating in Smash Hits. Attempting diversity, a mostly a cappella ballad, "Now Those Days Are Gone", was released as the next single, giving the group another top-ten hit, reaching No. 8 in the UK charts. Soon after this, Bucks Fizz were invited to appear before the Queen and Queen Mother in the 1982 Royal Variety Performance, performing the old standard "You'll Never Walk Alone".

In February 1983, Bucks Fizz arrived in Chile for the promotion of their Spanish album. They performed in the music festival Festival Internacional de la Canción de Viña del Mar, which was broadcast in Chile and many countries in South America, as well as in Spain. In the UK, chart success continued with the release of the hit singles "If You Can't Stand the Heat" and "Run for Your Life". The group's third studio album, Hand Cut, was released in March 1983, becoming another top-twenty hit and certified silver by the BPI. By this stage, although Bucks Fizz faced harsh criticism in the media for their lightweight pop image, the music press were acknowledging the group's highly polished performances and sturdy productions, gaining favourable mentions in the NME and Record Mirror. With an eye to harden their sound, the group's next single, "When We Were Young", featured a heavy production and doom-laden lyrics. With a rock-style lead vocal by member Jay Aston, the single became one of the group's biggest hits, featuring in the top 20 of many European countries, including top ten in the UK and top five in France. However, toward the end of 1983, it seemed that the group's success was beginning to dim as singles "London Town" and "Rules of the Game" failed to reach the top twenty — their first singles to miss. Along with these came the group's Greatest Hits album, which, despite reaching the top thirty and remaining on the charts for three months, fell short of expectations.

Early in 1984, the group decided to take time out of the public eye, fearing overexposure for their recent downward trend and instead concentrating on recording in Switzerland. In May, they embarked on a 40-date tour of the UK, selling out many venues. In August they revealed their new look and new harder-edged rock sound with the single "Talking in Your Sleep". The break proved to be advantageous, as this single returned the group to the UK top 20, peaking at No. 15. The follow-up single "Golden Days" was released alongside group's fourth studio album, I Hear Talk. The group had recorded "What’s Love Got To Do With It" for inclusion on the album, but the track was omitted when Tina Turner released her version first. The group saw their fortunes tumble once again, as neither the album nor "Golden Days" dented the top 40. As Christmas 1984 came around, the group embarked on another UK tour and released the album's title single, a minor hit that reached No. 34.

=== Coach crash ===
On 11 December 1984, while on tour and returning from a sold-out gig in Newcastle, the group's tour bus was extensively damaged after colliding with an articulated lorry. While no one was killed, several members of the crew were badly injured, including all the members of Bucks Fizz. Bobby G was treated for whiplash, Jay Aston was hospitalised for back injuries and severe head pains and Cheryl Baker broke three vertebrae in her spine, but it was Mike Nolan who suffered the worst injuries. Nolan's head was badly injured with internal bleeding and he fell into a coma. After an operation, he was reported to have died on the operating table but placed on a life support machine. He remained in a coma for three days whilst the British press kept Bucks Fizz on the front-page headlines. Surgeon Anthony Strong at Newcastle General Hospital said that Nolan's condition was critical. On 15 December, it was reported that Nolan awoke from his coma with the words "I'm all right". Following this, Nolan was ordered not to work for the next six months. The effects of the crash remain with him today, including epilepsy, short-term memory loss and a 50% loss of vision in both eyes. Following this, Baker and Nolan helped set up the HeadFirst charity for crash victims suffering head injuries.

On 12 December 2009, the original Bucks Fizz (Nolan, Baker and Aston) played a benefit concert for HeadFirst at Newcastle City Hall to commemorate the 25th anniversary of the accident — the same venue they played the night of the crash. The anniversary of the crash was reported on local BBC News, with the members revisiting the crash location.

=== Line-up changes ===
With Nolan recuperating during early 1985, the group returned to recording and released their next single in June. However, within the group, tensions had mounted to the point that Jay Aston no longer wanted to continue. As she recalled it was "like a survival instinct. We all nearly died and then there's all this infighting. It's like 'this is inhuman, I've got to get out of here'". After early promotion and a concert in Newcastle, she quit the group, despite still being under contract. Again, Bucks Fizz found themselves the subject of newspaper headlines, this time with the revelation that Aston had been having an affair with Andy Hill — the husband of the group's creator, Nichola Martin. Aston sold her story to the press in an article headlined "The hateful, bitchy world of Bucks Fizz," while member Cheryl Baker was keen to point out that they were never friends. Aston was sued by management over breach of contract while a replacement member was quickly sought to continue promotion for the current single. Auditions were held at the Prince of Wales Theatre, where 800 girls were seen - and out of those, 21-year-old Shelley Preston was selected.

In early 1986, the group's contract with RCA Records expired and a new one with Polydor was signed. The first single, "New Beginning (Mamba Seyra)", was released in May and brought the group back to prominence, becoming a top-10 hit and one of their most successful singles. After two more less-successful singles and an album, the group took a break during 1987 and regrouped in 1988. After a brief UK tour, the group released their final chart hit, "Heart of Stone" (later a worldwide hit for Cher) and a compilation album, The Story So Far. These proved to be the end for Bucks Fizz as a recording group, and after a concert tour in 1989, Preston left the group at the end of the year.

With the focus on live work and touring, the group continued into the 1990s, now as a three-piece of Baker, G and Nolan. In 1991, celebrating 10 years together, Bucks Fizz released their last album, Live at Fairfield Halls. By this time, Baker had embarked on a separate and successful career as a television presenter and was eager to start a family. In December 1993, she left the group. Early the following year, keen to keep the group active, Bobby G (who was by then in effect taking over management of the act) and Nolan recruited two newcomers, Heidi Manton (who would later go on to marry G) and Amanda Szwarc. This line-up continued until 1996 when Nolan left and ex-Dollar star David Van Day joined.

=== Group dispute ===
The partnership between G and Van Day proved to be short-lived as the two failed to gel. In 1997, Van Day quit the group after a show in the Falkland Islands. Unable to come to an agreement with G, Van Day teamed up with Mike Nolan and two new female recruits (Lianna Lea and Sally Jacks) to form a new version of Bucks Fizz. Unhappy with the situation, G put an injunction on the name, resulting in the second group to go under the name "Bucks Fizz starring Mike Nolan and featuring David Van Day". Under Van Day's guidance, this version released a newly recorded "Making Your Mind Up" single as well as an album of re-recorded Bucks Fizz songs. The album was released by several different record companies simultaneously, each with different artwork and titles (including The Best of Bucks Fizz and The Greatest Hits of Bucks Fizz). Neither the single or album found chart success and the recordings were universally derided by the group's fans.

By 2001, Nolan too had found it difficult to work with Van Day and left the group. With his then girlfriend, future UK Eurovision representative James Fox and West End performer Sarah J Price, Van Day continued to tour under the moniker "Bucks Fizz", despite never having been a member of the hit-making line-up. By this time, G and co-star (and now wife), Heidi Manton had acquired the legal rights to the name "Bucks Fizz", and brought a case in the High Court against Van Day (at this point Fox and Price hastily left the group). Bucks Fizz as a registered UK trade mark was filed in favour of Manton on 25 June 1997 and then registered in 2001 in classes 09 and 41. In 2001, a judge refused to grant a court injunction against Van Day as he had been operating as Bucks Fizz for five years at the time.

The feud and legal battle between Bobby G and David Van Day as to who had the right to perform under the name "Bucks Fizz" was the subject of a BBC television documentary, Trouble at the Top. The case was settled out of court in August 2002 when Van Day agreed to call his version of the group "David Van Day's Bucks Fizz Show". This group however was short-lived and soon Van Day returned to performing as Dollar. This chapter of the group's history has been referred to as one of the "messiest break-ups in music history".

=== Recent years ===
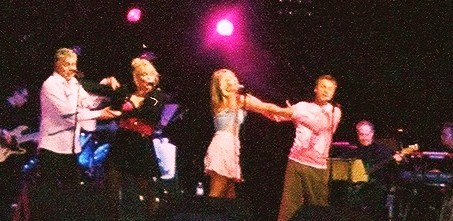
The Original Bucks Fizz performing in 2004

In 2004, BMG Records released all of Bucks Fizz's original studio albums on compact disc, which renewed interest in the group. In 2005, BBC viewers were invited to vote on the most memorable Eurovision moments ever. Bucks Fizz won with the "Making Your Mind Up" skirt-rip routine. A double CD collection of all the group's hits on both RCA and Polydor, The Ultimate Anthology, came out that summer. In 2006 and 2008, two albums The Lost Masters and The Lost Masters 2 were released. These were made up of previously unreleased Bucks Fizz material and were well received by fans. In early 2009, a two-hour documentary The Bucks Fizz Story was filmed. It featured in-depth interviews from the original group members as well as management and other behind-the-scenes personnel. A DVD of the documentary was released in August 2010 through Glassbeach Media Ltd, and saw a general release in November 2011. During the 2010s the original Bucks Fizz studio albums were released again as double-disc editions.

In the late 2010s Bucks Fizz continued performing live as well as another line-up performing under the name the Fizz. Cheryl Baker, Mike Nolan and Jay Aston achieved comeback success under this name, recording their first studio album in thirty years with record producer and songwriter Mike Stock of Stock Aitken Waterman fame. The F-Z of Pop, the group's comeback album reached the top 30 in the UK Albums Chart and was BBC Radio 2's 'album of the week' by Ken Bruce. They have subsequently recorded a Christmas album - Christmas with the Fizz and their third album Smoke & Mirrors was released on 6 March 2020, helmed again by Mike Stock. In May 2024, Mike Nolan announced his departure from the group effective later in the year. He was replaced by singers Matthew Pateman and Nikk Mager, making the group a quartet again.

Original member Bobby G continues as Bucks Fizz with his line-up.

== Members ==
There have been 16 members of the group since its formation in 1981. Bucks Fizz operated as a trio between 1990 and 1993. Current member Jenny Phillips was originally a temporary member, covering Heidi Manton's maternity leave, before returning as a full-time member in 2022.

=== Current lineup ===
- Bobby G (1981–present)
- Tammy Choat (2004–present)
- Wayne Chinnery (2003–2006, 2022–present)
- Jenny Phillips (2006, 2022–present)

=== Previous members ===
- Mike Nolan (1981–1996)
- Cheryl Baker (1981–1993)
- Jay Aston (1981–1985)
- Shelley Preston (1985–1990)
- Heidi Manton (1994–2022)
- Amanda Szwarc (1994–1996)
- David Van Day (1996–1997)
- Karen Logan (1996)
- Louise Hart (1996–2002)
- Graham Crisp (1997–2002)
- Nikki Winter (2003)
- Paul Fordham (2006–2012)
- Paul Yates (2012–2022)

== Discography ==
- Bucks Fizz (1981)
- Are You Ready (1982)
- Hand Cut (1983)
- I Hear Talk (1984)
- Writing on the Wall (1986)

Awards and achievements
Preceded by (Republic of Ireland) Johnny Logan with "What's Another Year"	Winner of the Eurovision Song Contest; 1981	Succeeded by (Germany) Nicole with "Ein bißchen Frieden"
Preceded by Prima Donna with "Love Enough for Two"	UK in the Eurovision Song Contest; 1981	Succeeded by Bardo with "One Step Further"
