= The Land of Make Believe =

1981 single by Bucks Fizz

Single by Bucks Fizz

from the album Are You Ready?
- B-side: "Now You're Gone"
- Released: 13 November 1981
- Recorded: 1981
- Genre: Pop
- Length: 3.50
- Label: RCA
- Songwriters: Andy Hill & Pete Sinfield
- Producer: Andy Hill

Bucks Fizz singles chronology
"One of Those Nights" (1981)	"The Land of Make Believe" (1981)	"My Camera Never Lies" (1982)

"The Land of Make Believe" is a 1981 single by British band Bucks Fizz. It reached No. 1 in the UK in early 1982 – the second single by the band to do so. The song was produced by Andy Hill with music by Hill and lyrics by ex-King Crimson member Peter Sinfield. Despite the apparent sugar-coated style of the song, Sinfield later said it was a subtle attack on Margaret Thatcher and her government's policy at the time. "The Land of Make Believe" became a big hit across Europe in early 1982, topping the charts in Netherlands, Belgium and Ireland as well as the UK. The song was later covered by pop band allSTARS* for a 2002 single release.

== Overview ==
=== Song information ===
"The Land of Make Believe" was the second of three UK No. 1 singles for the British Eurovision winners Bucks Fizz, staying at the top for two weeks in January 1982. It remained on the charts for 16 weeks.

The lyrics are based on a child's dream where ghostly voices lure the child outside to a world where everything is bright and happy, but the child resists. The characters Superman and Captain Kidd are referenced in the lyrics. The close of the song features a nursery rhyme narrated by Abby Kimber, who was the 11-year-old daughter of Bill Kimber, an executive of RCA Records. This was an original piece penned by Sinfield. At the time, radio stations were instructed to fade the song before the narration. Sinfield said that the song "Beneath its tra-la-la's is a virulent anti-Thatcher song" and went on to say "it is ten-times more difficult to write a three-minute hit song, with a veneer of integrity, than it is to write anything for King Crimson or ELP".

During the recording, band member Mike Nolan expressed reservations about the song, and told producer Andy Hill that it would not be a hit and would probably spell the end for the band. Hill, however, told Nolan that Bobby G and Cheryl Baker had already recorded their parts of the song and had said that they really liked it. Nolan later admitted that his judgement was obviously wrong. Bobby G spent an afternoon recording harmonies for the middle 8 of the song, but after he left the studio, the engineer accidentally wiped the tape and the vocal part was never re-recorded.

=== Music video ===
The music video was filmed at swimming baths in White City, London, and is an homage to various childhood stories. It begins in black-and-white, in a bedroom where band member Cheryl Baker is waking up; the picture changes to colour (in an allusion to the film The Wizard of Oz), and Baker's clothes are transformed by a Fairy Godmother in the style of Cinderella. She then walks from everyday life, through a gap into a winter wonderland and has to push her way through fir trees (an allusion to The Lion, the Witch and the Wardrobe), before joining the rest of the band on stage.

The remainder of the video consists of the group performing the song, intercut with brief fantastical scenes. The costumes the group wore in the video were subsequently used in television appearances for the song and many photo-shoots. Member Jay Aston chose the outfits, with the female costumes from Kahn & Bell on London's King's Road and the male costumes from Boy. They cost between £50 and £120 each. Aston has since remarked that it was one of her favourite looks for the band and in reference to hers and Baker's costume said "we were ten years ahead of Madonna with the cone boobs".

=== Chart performance and reception ===
The single was released in November 1981 and became a top 10 hit in December, being placed at No.5 for the Christmas chart. The following week it was placed at No.2, behind The Human League's "Don't You Want Me", before finally taking over at No.1 in January. It remained there for two weeks, before falling out of the charts after 16 weeks – the group's longest run on the UK singles chart. The song became the group's biggest-selling single in the UK, outselling their Eurovision winner "Making Your Mind Up", to finish as the 41st-biggest seller of the 1980s. It also reached No.1 in the Netherlands, Belgium and Ireland, while in Germany it also became their biggest selling single. The song was the group's debut single release in the US, but did not achieve chart success there.

Critical reaction to the song was favourable, with Record Mirror stating: "Prejudices and preconceptions aside, it's an excellent record and a worthy successor to 'Don't You Want Me' at the top." "The Land of Make Believe" remains a firm fan favourite and reviews in the press at the time were positive with Smash Hits calling the song "sheer genius" and more recently Q Magazine labelling the song "not half bad" and "an 80s classic". Members Bobby G and Cheryl Baker have both named it as the best of the band's songs. It seems that "The Land of Make Believe" also earned them a grudging respect within music circles, as Baker recalls confronting Bob Geldof who had publicly "slagged off" the band; he then admitted to her that he actually really liked "The Land of Make Believe". The Human League's Philip Oakey contemporarily declared his admiration for Bucks Fizz in general, while OMD's Andy McCluskey said that he thought it was "an absolutely wonderful song with a great melody".

"The Land of Make Believe" was many times used as the closing number of Bucks Fizz's concerts. During their 1984 tour a lighting effect to simulate falling snow was used to signify the festive feel of the song due to its Christmas-time release. The song was later included on the group's second album, Are You Ready, and was later released in a remixed form in 1991 as a bootleg single. A similar version of this was included on a compilation album released in 2005, while a more recent remix of the song was featured on the group's 2008 album The Lost Masters 2 – The Final Cut. The B-side of the single was a ballad, "Now You're Gone", featuring lead vocals by Cheryl Baker. The song features the chorus line "It doesn't feel like Christmas now you're gone"; this remains the only festive-themed song recorded by the group. An alternate ending to this song was featured as a hidden track on The Lost Masters 2 – The Final Cut.

== Track listing ==
7" single

1. "The Land of Make Believe" (Andy Hill / Pete Sinfield) (3.51)
2. "Now You're Gone" (Hill / Nichola Martin) (3.36)

12" single (released in Germany only)

1. "The Land of Make Believe" (Hill / Sinfield) (3.51)
2. "Midnight Reservation" (Hill / Sinfield) (3.44)
3. "Now You're Gone" (Hill / Martin) (3.36)

== Charts ==
=== Weekly charts ===
Chart (1982)	Peak position
Australia (Kent Music Report)	15
Austria (Ö3 Austria Top 40)	7
Belgium (Ultratop 50 Flanders)	1
Denmark (Hitlisten)	3
Ireland (IRMA)	1
Israel (IBA)	6
Netherlands (Dutch Top 40)	1
Netherlands (Single Top 100)	2
New Zealand (Recorded Music NZ)	44
UK Singles (Official Charts)	1
West Germany (GfK)	3

=== Year-end charts ===
Chart (1982)	Position
Australia (Kent Music Report)	64
Belgium (Ultratop Flanders)	18
Netherlands (Dutch Top 40)	30
Netherlands (Single Top 100)	19
West Germany (Official German Charts)	44

== allSTARS* version ==
"The Land of Make Believe"

Single by allSTARS*

from the album AllSTARS*
- B-side: "Rock This House"
- Released: 14 January 2002
- Genre: Pop
- Length: 3:20
- Label: Island
- Songwriters: Andy Hill, Pete Sinfield
- Producer: Ray "Madman" Hedges

AllSTARS* singles chronology
"Things That Go Bump in the Night" / "Is There Something I Should Know?" (2001)	"The Land of Make Believe" (2002)	"Back When / Going All The Way" (2002)

"The Land of Make Believe" was the third single by the British band allSTARS*. The single was slightly faster than the original version and had a more euro-pop sound. The music video was set in a circus tent, with each individual member of the band performing tricks e.g. being cut in half, levitating or juggling. The single performed to moderate success, achieving allSTARS*' highest UK chart position of No.9.

Track listing

UK CD Single

1. "The Land of Make Believe" (3.22)
2. "Things That Go Bump in the Night [Xenomania mix]" (6.56)
3. "Rock This House" (3.16)
4. "The Land of Make Believe" – enhanced video

UK Cassette Single

1. "The Land of Make Believe" (3.22)
2. "Rock This House" (3.16)

PROMO

1. "The Land Of Make Believe" (Almighty Mix)
2. "The Land Of Make Believe" (Radio Edit)

== Other versions ==
"The Land of Make Believe" has also been recorded by future fellow Eurovision winner Celine Dion (translated into French: "A quatre pas d'ici", meaning "A few steps from here") in 1983 for her album Du soleil au cœur (Hill and Sinfield would later pen her hits "Think Twice" and "Call the Man"). In 1982, French singer Sheila recorded the song in French as "Condition Féminine" ("The Status of Women") while German singer Elke Best recorded it as "Land der Phantasie" ("Land of Imagination"). Brazilian girl-group Harmony Cats recorded a Portuguese version in 1984 (as "Terra do Faz de Conta", a literal translation of the title). Bucks Fizz themselves recorded the song in Spanish as "El Mundo de Ilusion" ("The World of Illusion") in 1982, with adapted lyrics by argentinian composers and producers Buddy and Mary Mc Cluskey. The song (in English) was also recorded by children's group Minipops in 1982 and an anonymous cover version for the Top of the Pops album range.

== See also ==
- List of Dutch Top 40 number-one singles of 1982
- List of number-one singles of 1982 (Ireland)
- List of number-one singles from the 1980s (UK)
