= Bobby G =

British singer (born 1953)

- Also known as: Bobby Gee
- Born: Robert Gubby; 23 August 1953 (age 73); Epsom, Surrey, England
- Genre: Pop
- Occupation: Singer
- Instruments: Vocals; harmonica
- Years active: 1981–present
- Labels: RCA; Polydor; BBC

Bobby G (born Robert Alan Gubby, 23 August 1953), also known as Bobby Gee, is a member of pop group Bucks Fizz, best known for winning the 1981 Eurovision Song Contest and for achieving three UK number one hits with "Making Your Mind Up" (1981), "The Land of Make Believe" (1981) and "My Camera Never Lies" (1982).

== Early career ==
G was born in Epsom, Surrey, England. After leaving school at 14, he began working in a number of trades, the most significant of these being in construction. In his late teens he set up his own building business, based on the knowledge he had gained from his father, who was also a builder. For much of the 1970s he worked in building and plumbing.

By the end of the decade, both businesses had failed, leaving him with heavy debts as well as having two marriages, both of which ended in divorce.

In 1979, G decided to embark on a career in music and began touring pubs and clubs as a solo singer/guitarist. In 1980, G auditioned for a role in the West End musical Jesus Christ Superstar and became an understudy for the role of Pontius Pilate. The musical had been running for eight years at the Palace Theatre and was then the longest running musical ever in the UK, but it closed the same year as G joined the cast. He then went on to perform as a resident singer in a local country club.

== Bucks Fizz ==
In January 1981, G auditioned for a new pop group being put together by songwriter/manager Nichola Martin. The group was called Bucks Fizz and were to perform in that year's A Song for Europe contest with the song "Making Your Mind Up". After another singer Stephen Fischer became unavailable, G was offered the job following further auditions.

Along with other members Mike Nolan, Cheryl Baker and Jay Aston the group went on to win the contest and on 4 April 1981 took part in the Eurovision Song Contest representing the United Kingdom. Bucks Fizz won the contest and the group were catapulted into overnight stardom. The song reached No.1 in the UK charts and sold four million copies worldwide.

Bucks Fizz began a career which saw them have many hits around the world over the next few years, notably so in Britain, where they became one of the biggest groups of the 1980s and scored many hit singles and albums, including two further No.1s "The Land of Make Believe" and "My Camera Never Lies".

On 11 December 1984, while on tour in Newcastle, the group were involved in a coach crash. G received medical attention for whiplash injuries, but unlike other band members, was not seriously harmed. The accident gained much media attention including front-page headlines and television news reports.

The group continued on for the rest of the decade and scored their final hit in 1988.

== Later Bucks Fizz ==
In 1990, Bucks Fizz became a three-piece (G, Nolan and Baker), and they continued to tour the country. Apart from a 1991 live album, no other recordings were made by the group.

Baker left the group in 1993 and around this time G largely took over the management of Bucks Fizz, employing two new members, Heidi Manton and Amanda Schwartz. In 1995, Nolan also left the group and so G became the only original member. G took on former Dollar star David Van Day as Nolan's replacement.

Van Day was keen to record with the group, but G decided that this was not economically viable and was happy to continue touring. Unrest grew between the two and eventually after a show in the Falklands, Van Day quit the group. G rapidly employed a replacement, while Van Day launched a rival group along with former member Nolan. Unhappy with the situation, G filed a lawsuit against this version of the group and attempted to gain the rights to the Bucks Fizz name. In the early 2000s, G took Van Day to court, but was initially unsuccessful. Eventually he won the right to perform in the only officially recognised Bucks Fizz, following Nolan's departure from the Van Day version. In 2002, the debacle became the subject of a BBC2 documentary entitled Trouble at the Top, which saw interviews with both G and Van Day centring on their conflicting views.

In 2004, G performed once again with original members Nolan and Baker and later member, Shelley Preston as part of the Here and Now 1980's revival tour. This took in several arenas around the UK, but remained a one-off as G returned to his currently performing line-up. He also briefly appeared alongside Nolan, Baker, Preston and original member Aston in the video for Comic Relief's 2007 single "I'm Gonna Be (500 Miles)"

Members of Bucks Fizz continue to tour in two versions; one version consists of Cheryl Baker, Jay Aston, Matthew Pateman, and Nikk Mager as The Fizz (Mike Nolan left in 2024), whilst the other contains Bobby G, his wife and two other singers as Bucks Fizz.

== Solo career ==
G was keen to launch a solo career during the hit-making days of Bucks Fizz. In the end, only one single was released. This was the theme tune to BBC TV's Big Deal, which was released in 1984 and although only reached No.46, the song remained on the UK Charts for 12 weeks. G also wrote and produced a number of songs for Bucks Fizz, none of these were released as singles, but became album tracks and B-sides for the group.

Further solo recordings were made but went unreleased until 2006 and 2008 when two compilation CDs of unreleased Bucks Fizz tracks, The Lost Masters included some of his solo work.

== Personal life ==
In the 1970s, G married twice and had a child by his first wife. In the early 1980s he divorced his second wife but subsequently continued in a relationship with her while fathering a second child in 1982. They split in the 1990s and G began a relationship with band member Heidi Manton. They married in 2000 and have a daughter.
