= Andy Hill (composer) =

English record producer and songwriter (born 1957)

- Born: Andrew Gerard Hill; 1957 (age 68–69); Bracknell, Berkshire, England
- Genre: Pop
- Occupations: Songwriter, record producer, musician
- Instruments: Guitar, keyboards
- Years active: 1980–present
- Labels: Big Note Music, RCA

Andrew Gerard Hill (born 1957) is an English record producer and songwriter who worked with Bucks Fizz and Celine Dion during the 1980s and 1990s.

On many of his compositions he was partnered by lyricist Peter Sinfield, who had formerly worked with King Crimson. He has been nominated for an Ivor Novello Award on seven occasions, and has won the award twice in the category "Best Song Musically and Lyrically" and once for "Songwriter of the Year". He also composed the winning song in the Eurovision Song Contest 1981, Making Your Mind Up.

== Career ==
Hill experienced his earliest success when he co-wrote and produced the UK's winning Eurovision Song Contest 1981 entry for Bucks Fizz, "Making Your Mind Up".

Hill took part in the 1981 A Song For Europe contest, alongside his partner (and later his wife, now ex-wife) Nichola Martin, with their band Gem, performing "Have You Ever Been in Love?" This was released as a single under the name Paris but did not chart. Leo Sayer took his version of the single into the UK Singles Chart. The song been covered by many other musicians.

For much of the decade, Hill concentrated on carving a successful career for Bucks Fizz and following their Eurovision chart-topper, he went on to write and produce two further UK number 1's "The Land of Make Believe" and "My Camera Never Lies". By 1986 he was responsible for (either writing or producing) all 11 of the band's UK Top 20 hits.

Since then, he has also written for Eminem, The Wanted, Celine Dion, Cliff Richard, Ronan Keating, Diana Ross, Westlife, Boyzone, Cher, Johnny Hallyday, and Queen. These writing credits include Celine Dion's "Think Twice" (1994), which reached number one in the charts of Belgium, Denmark, Ireland, Netherlands, Norway, Sweden and the United Kingdom. In the UK, the song topped the chart for seven weeks in 1995, and went on to sell over a million copies. It remains Hill's biggest hit to date. He subsequently wrote "Call the Man" for Celine Dion's album Falling into You which, with sales in excess of 32 million, is one of the biggest selling albums of all time. He also gained success in the US, when he partnered with Peter Cetera for his World Falling Down album. From this, the single "Restless Heart" reached number 1 on the Adult Contemporary Chart for 10 consecutive weeks.

More recently he has written songs for Il Divo on their debut album, and collaborated with Gary Barlow on Katherine Jenkins 2007 album, Rejoice. He wrote "Proud" on Susan Boyle's 2009 album, I Dreamed a Dream, and has written songs for Westlife, Johnny Hallyday and Boyzone.

== Compositions ==
His songs include;

- "Give a Little Bit More" (Cliff Richard, I'm No Hero, 1980)
- "Making Your Mind Up" (Bucks Fizz, 1981)
- "Piece of the Action" (Bucks Fizz, 1981)
- "The Land of Make Believe" (Bucks Fizz, 1981)
- "Have You Ever Been in Love" (Leo Sayer, 1982)
- "My Camera Never Lies" (Bucks Fizz, 1982)
- "Now Those Days are Gone" (Bucks Fizz, 1982)
- "If You Can't Stand the Heat" (Bucks Fizz, 1982)
- "Run for Your Life" (Bucks Fizz, 1983)
- "One Touch Too Much" (Katz, 1985)
- "Two Strong Hearts" (John Farnham, 1988)
- "Heart of Stone" (Cher, Heart of Stone, 1989)
- "Restless Heart" (Peter Cetera, 1992)
- "Peace in Our Time" (Cliff Richard, The Album, 1993)
- "Think Twice" (Celine Dion, The Colour of My Love, 1994)
- "Call the Man" (Celine Dion, Falling into You, 1996)
- "I will" (Worlds Apart, Here and now, 2000)
- "Real World" (D-Side, 2003)
- "Reaching Out" (Queen + Paul Rodgers, 2005)
- "I'll See You Again" (Westlife, 2009)
- "Beautiful" (Eminem, 2009)
- "Proud" (Susan Boyle, 2009)
- "Walks like Rihanna" (The Wanted, 2013)
- "Seul" (Johnny Hallyday, 2014)

== Producer ==
As a producer, Hill produced many of Bucks Fizz's biggest hits, Vanessa-Mae's 1997 album Storm, as well as UK top ten hits "One Step Further" by Bardo; "Real World" by D-Side and the US AC number one "Restless Heart" by Peter Cetera.

== Performer ==
As a performer he played guitar, and performed backing vocals, on many of his own productions. He also sang lead vocals for his short-lived early 1980s band, Paris.

Paris released four singles in total:

Date	Single
March 1982	"Have You Ever Been in Love"
May 1982	"No Getting Over You"
January 1983	"Censored"
July 1983	"Another Sad Affair"

Of these, only "No Getting Over You" made the UK Singles Chart, peaking at number 49.
