= Bpoplive =

Cancelled pro-Brexit music festival

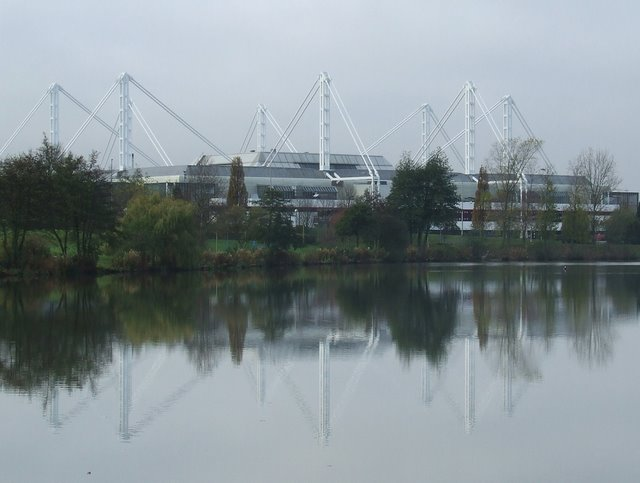
- Genting Arena, where Bpoplive was set to be held
- Date: 8 May 2016 (cancelled); 19 June 2016 (cancelled)
- Location: Genting Arena, Birmingham
- Type: Concert and political rally
- Theme: Brexit
- Organized by: Leave.EU and Brexit Live
- Website: http://www.bpoplive.co.uk/

Bpoplive (also marketed as Brexit Live presents bpopLIVE) was a planned music festival and political rally in support of the United Kingdom leaving the European Union ("Brexit"), supported by the pressure group Leave.EU and scheduled to be held on 19 June 2016 at Genting Arena, Birmingham. The proposed line-up for the event was changed several times, as artists pulled out complaining that they had not been told that it was a political event. The original plan was for three events to be held in the run-up to the EU membership referendum, but the concert, which was to be held on 8 May 2016, was cancelled when all of the line-up except Phats and Small pulled out.

Leave.EU denied that the event was political, and said that it was a non-partisan event to increase voter registration among young people, claiming that the presence of Leave.EU logos and anti-EU speakers on Bpoplive promotional material was "a miscommunication", but the event has been widely referred to in the media as a "Brexit concert" or "anti-EU music festival" and in the original press release as "the biggest political rally in modern British history". Politicians from the Leave.EU campaign were also set to speak at the concert.

== Background ==
BuzzFeed identified Bpoplive as an attempt to reach the key youth demographic by the Leave campaign. Leave.EU described the event as related to the American Rock the Vote campaign, a non-partisan attempt to engage young voters, who traditionally have low turnout.

The cancelled 8 May event was explicitly organised by Leave.EU and Grassroots Out; however, on 26 May 2016, Leave.EU disclaimed any role in the 19 June festival beyond endorsing it. The official organiser was "Brexit Live", which is registered as a non-party campaign group separately from Leave.EU, which means that Bpoplive's costs did not count towards Leave.EU's spending limits. However, the Daily Mirror noted that Bpoplive was being organised by Leave.EU's leaders, and Brexit's Live's spokesperson—who was also Leave.EU's spokesperson—told the Mirror that Bpoplive's expenses "probably should" be registered under Leave.EU, but that they had not broken any rules.

== First attempt ==
The first Bpoplive concert was organized for 8 May 2016, the day after local and regional elections. The line-up was announced as including UK garage duo DJ Luck and MC Neat, electro swing sextet The Electric Swing Circus, house act Phats and Small and a DJ set from Sigma. The press release for the event also promised "speeches from leading personalities and politicians who support leaving the EU". When contacted by the press, all artists except Phats and Small—who could not be contacted—claimed that they had not been told that the event was political, and would not be participating. A Leave.EU press officer denied that the event was political, and said that there had been two possible concepts for the event—a partisan pro-Brexit rally and a non-partisan "Rock the Vote" type event—and that the wrong press release was sent out by mistake. The event never went ahead.

== Second attempt ==
Bpoplive was subsequently rearranged to be held on 19 June 2016, the Sunday before the referendum. The line-up was announced as boyband 5ive, R&B singer Alesha Dixon, boyband East 17, disco group Sister Sledge and the soul singer Gwen Dickey from the band Rose Royce. Tickets were made available starting from £23. 5ive were announced as a duo, with only Ritchie Neville—who had previously made comments that were interpreted as being in favour of the Leave campaign—and Scott Robinson from the group taking part, while Sean Conlon, who had tweeted messages in support of EU migrants, was not included. The entire band subsequently withdrew. Alesha Dixon, East 17 and Sister Sledge also pulled out. Publicists for both 5ive and Dixon said that they had not been told that it was a political event. The only artist to confirm participation was Gwen Dickey, who said that she would still be taking part as an entertainer but that as an American she could not vote in the referendum and had no opinion on it one way or the other. Between the acts, Leave.EU campaigners Nigel Farage, Liam Fox and Kate Hoey were set to give speeches.

== Third attempt ==
Following the collapse of the second line-up, Leave.EU director Arron Banks announced that there would be a third line-up, who the campaign's Head of Communications Andy Wigmore described as "British Patriots [who] want to leave the EU".

On 1 June 2016, Leave.EU announced "Bpop Live version 3.0", with a line-up comprising Cheryl Baker, Mike Nolan, Jay Aston and Bobby McVay performing as "Formerly of Bucks Fizz" (Note: The rights to the name "Bucks Fizz" remain with Bobby G, whose group was not booked to perform at Bpoplive.) and an Elvis impersonator, Gordon Hendricks. R&B singer Alexander O'Neal and soul singer Kenny Thomas were subsequently added. Formerly of Bucks Fizz confirmed on their Twitter account that they were playing but did not endorse either Leave or Remain. In the following days, Ray Lewis of The Drifters was added to the line-up, and the ticket price was reduced to £5.

On 14 June, Leave.EU announced that the concert had been cancelled, suggesting that this was a demand from the Electoral Commission, which denied any involvement in the decision.

== See also ==
- List of music festivals in the United Kingdom
- Great American State Fair, an American musical festival that also saw artists withdraw over its political nature.
