= Up Late with Rylan =

- Genre: Chat show
- Written by: Howard Davidson; Rylan Clark
- Directed by: Ollie Bartlett
- Creative director: Katherine Lynch
- Presented by: Rylan Clark
- Country of origin: United Kingdom
- No. of episodes: 16

Production
- Executive producer: Richard Greenwood
- Editor: Stephen Keevil
- Production company: Initial

Original release
- Network: Channel 5
- Release: 9 May – 6 June 2016

Up Late with Rylan is a British late night chat show presented by Rylan Clark. The show premiered on Channel 5 on 9 May 2016. Due to the poor ratings and a negative reception, the show was not renewed for a second series.

== Format ==
Rylan Clark-Neal hosts a lively, interactive late night chat-show featuring guests, gossip, music and games.

=== Recurring sketches and segments ===
- McCann or McCann't – Ferne McCann
- Turner's Top Tips – Anthea Turner
- Sophie's Choice – Sophie Willan
- Rylan Relief – Rylan Clark-Neal

=== Games ===
==== Back Catalogue Bingo ====
In this game Rylan sends celebrities to a phone to phone a business and use as many words related to the celebrity as they can in 90 Seconds.

Celebrity	Topic	Score
Joe Swash	Things Related to Animals	38
Phillip Schofield	Things related to Phillip Schofield	31
Amanda Holden	Things related to Amanda Holden	29
Shaun Williamson	Everything EastEnders	28
Lethal Bizzle	N/A	25
Keith Duffy	Everything Boyzone/Westlife	23
Mel B	Everything Spice Girls	16

==== Bank or Bin ====
Each week, a member of the public is given 6 singletons, which they must cut down to 2. Based on the gifts they bring, they must then decide who they would like to take on a date. On the following night's episode, the couple return and reveal if they want to go on a second date.

== Episodes ==
Series	Episodes	Originally aired	
Series	Episodes	Series premiere	Series finale
1	16	9 May 2016	6 June 2016

=== Series 1 ===
Episode No	Date	Guests	Performance	Celebrity Barmaid
1	9 May 2016	Alesha Dixon, Keith Lemon and Shakka	Shakka performed "You Don't Know What You Do To Me"	Charlotte Crosby
2	10 May 2016	Keith Duffy, Brian McFadden, Helen Lederer and Jorgie Porter	—N/a	Charlotte Crosby
3	11 May 2016	Ronan Keating, Cheryl Baker, Mike Nolan, Jay Aston, Bobby McVay (Sonia segment with Barei, Nicky Byrne, Frans, Poli Genova, Amir Haddad, Ira Losco, Kaliopi and Joe and Jake) and Stacey Solomon	Cheryl Baker, Mike Nolan, Jay Aston and Bobby McVay performed "Making Your Mind Up"	Charlotte Crosby
4	12 May 2016	Mel B, Rickie Haywood Williams, Melvin Odoom, Stavros Flatley, Helen Adams and WSTRN	WSTRN performed "Come Down"	Marnie Simpson
5	16 May 2016	Emilia Fox, Tom Parker, Jess Wright, Nev Wilshire and Hayley Pearce	—N/a	Sinitta
6	17 May 2016	Danniella Westbrook, Shaun Williamson and Joe and Jake	Joe and Jake performed "You're Not Alone"	Sinitta
7	18 May 2016	Amanda Holden, Lawson and Carol McGiffin	Lawson performed "Roads"	Sinitta
8	19 May 2016	Katie Price, Ollie Locke, Binky Felstead and Anne-Marie	Anne-Marie performed "Alarm"	Sinitta
9	23 May 2016	Scott Mills, Brooke Vincent, Amelia Lily and MO	MO performed "Who Do You Think Of"	Natasha Hamilton
10	24 May 2016	Richard Madeley, Ferne McCann and Reggie 'n' Bollie	—N/a	Natasha Hamilton
11	25 May 2016	Phillip Schofield, Holly Willoughby, Jennifer Metcalfe, Nick Pickard and Matt Richardson	—N/a	Natasha Hamilton
12	26 May 2016	The Vamps, Alison Hammond, Lethal Bizzle, Dave Benson Phillips and The Cheeky Girls	The Vamps performed "I Found a Girl"	Natasha Hamilton
13	31 May 2016	Linda Robson, Joe Swash and David Morgan	—N/a	Charlotte Crosby
14	1 June 2016	Kimberly Wyatt, Tom Davis, Kellie Maloney and Zak Abel	Zak Abel performed "Everybody Needs Love"	Vicky Pattison
15	2 June 2016	Matthew Morrison, George Shelley, Dave Berry, Lilah Parsons, Gary Lucy and Sinitta	Sinitta performed "Toy Boy"	Vicky Pattison
16	6 June 2016 (Big Brother Special)	Christopher Biggins, Tiffany Pollard, Kate Lawler and Alesha Dixon	Alesha Dixon performed "Stop"	Vicky Pattison
