= Christmas with the Fizz =

Studio album by The Fizz
- Released: 16 November 2018
- Recorded: 2018
- Studio: MPG Studios, London, UK
- Genre: Pop, Christmas
- Label: MPG Records
- Producer: Mike Stock

The Fizz chronology
The F-Z of Pop (2017)	Christmas with the Fizz (2018)	Smoke & Mirrors (2020)

Singles from The Fizz
- 1. "Don't Start Without Me" Released: November 2018

Christmas with the Fizz is a 2018 album by British pop group The Fizz. It is a festive-themed album, the group's first and was released in November 2018. The album features the line-up of Cheryl Baker, Mike Nolan and Jay Aston, fourth member Bobby McVay having parted with the band earlier in the year. Christmas with the Fizz was produced by experienced hit producer Mike Stock.

== Background ==
Christmas with the Fizz was in the planning stages early in 2018, after the group had experienced chart success with their The F-Z of Pop album in late 2017. Producer Mike Stock came up with the idea of doing a Christmas-themed album, as he states, "from our first meeting, I always thought a Christmas record would work wonderfully with the band...because they are such a positive bunch of people and so much fun, it just really translates into Christmas cheer." Member Bobby McVay left the band in February, due to family commitments in Italy, reducing the act to a three-piece. Another challenge came a couple of months later as member Jay Aston was diagnosed with mouth cancer. As a result of this, she went into the studio early to record her vocals before she underwent surgery, there being a chance that she would not be able to sing again afterwards. She underwent surgery in early July.

The songs for the album were mostly cover versions of Christmas standards, mixed with original compositions, "Don't Start Without Me" and "So Christmas", the latter being written by member Cheryl Baker's daughter Kyla. Mike Stock chose the majority of the songs, while member Mike Nolan selected "Mull of Kintyre" as a festive-period song that he'd liked; the group themselves chose "White Christmas" as they'd performed it live a number of times through the years. The album was released on 16 November 2018 with the lead single "Don't Start Without Me" being released a week later. The video of the single featured fans of the group, who had been selected through a campaign with Pledge Music.

The album charted at No. 93 on the official UK Albums Chart, while it reached No. 65 in Scotland and went to No. 54 on the UK sales chart. Christmas with the Fizz met with mid to positive reviews, with The Herald saying that "[the group] were obviously loving every second of recording these songs and it radiates through the whole playlist". Concluding that it was "the seasonal album you didn't know you needed". Classic Pop awarded the album a three-star review.

== Track listing ==
1. "Don't Start Without Me" (Johan Kalel / Mike Stock) – 3:43
2. "I Believe in Father Christmas" (Greg Lake / Peter Sinfield) – 3:13
3. "Keeping the Dream Alive" (Aron Strobel / Stefan Zauner) – 4:02
4. "Mull of Kintyre" (Paul McCartney / Denny Laine) – 4:40
5. "So Christmas" (Kyla Stroud) – 2:31
6. "Home for My Heart" (Festive Mix) (Dave Colquhoun / Jay Aston / Mike Stock) – 3:15
7. "Wonderful Christmas Time" (McCartney) – 3:01
8. "Winter Wonderland" (Felix Bernard / Richard B. Smith) – 2:54
9. "Let It Snow! Let It Snow! Let It Snow!" (Jule Styne / Sammy Cahn) – 1:54
10. "Santa Claus Is Coming to Town" (Haven Gillespie / J. Fred Coots) – 2:56
11. "What a Wonderful World" (Bob Thiele / George David Weiss) – 2:17
12. "White Christmas" (Irving Berlin) – 2:54
13. "River" (Joni Mitchell) – 3:34
14. "The Land of Make Believe (Christmas Mix)" (Andy Hill / Sinfield) – 3:37
15. "Don't Start Without Me (Extended)" (Kalel / Stock) – 5:46

== Personnel ==
- Cheryl Baker – vocals
- Mike Nolan – vocals
- Jay Aston – vocals
- Mike Stock – instruments, production
- Jimmy Junior – instruments, production
- Chris Lyndon – engineer
- Bobby McVay – vocals on tracks 6 and 14
- Dave Colquhoun – guitar on tracks 1 and 6
- Rick Wakeman – piano on track 6
- The English Chamber Choir – vocals on track 6

== Chart positions ==
Country	Peak position
UK Albums	93
Scotland	65
UK Sales	54
