= Smoke & Mirrors (The Fizz album) =

Studio album by The Fizz
- Released: 6 March 2020
- Recorded: June 2018 – September 2019
- Studio: MPG, Surrey
- Genre: Pop
- Length: 38:00
- Label: MPG
- Producer: Mike Stock, Jimmy Junior

The Fizz chronology
Christmas with the Fizz (2018)	Smoke & Mirrors (2020)	Everything Under the Sun (2022)

Singles from The Fizz
- 1. "Winning Ways" Released: January 2020; 2. "TOTP" Released: February 2020; 3. "From Here to Eternity" Released: April 2020; 4. "The World We Left Behind" Released: July 2020

Smoke & Mirrors is a 2020 studio album by The Fizz, formerly Bucks Fizz. It is the third album by the group under the name The Fizz and the second as a threesome consisting of original members Cheryl Baker, Mike Nolan and Jay Aston. Released on 6 March 2020, the album entered the overall UK Albums Chart at No. 29, the UK Album Sales Chart at No. 6, the Official Vinyl Albums Chart at No. 5 and the UK Independent Albums Chart at No. 3. Its sales chart position of No. 6 is the highest entry of any previous Bucks Fizz/the Fizz albums.

== Background ==
After the success of the group's comeback album The F-Z of Pop, which saw the group return to the UK charts for the first time in 31 years, talks immediately began for a follow up album with producer Mike Stock. Whilst The F–Z of Pop contained three re-recordings of past Bucks Fizz hits as well as eight new compositions, it was agreed that moving forward the group would now focus solely on new material. The group went back into the studio in summer 2018 to begin recording for the new album. Fairly early on into the recording process Jay Aston was diagnosed with mouth cancer and would require surgery and extensive treatment. During this time it had also been discussed to bring forward plans for a Christmas album. Production quickly began to allow the producers to record all of Aston's vocal parts for the release before she had to undergo surgery which would leave her unable to sing for the foreseeable future. The tracks were then finished with Baker and Nolan providing all the backing vocals for 15 songs which would become Christmas with the Fizz.

In 2019, plans were made for The Fizz to return to the studio to finish recording the album now that Aston had recovered sufficiently to begin singing again. It also gave her the chance to complete her lead vocal on the track "From Here to Eternity", which she had recorded a guide vocal for on the day she received her cancer diagnosis.

Recording of Smoke & Mirrors was completed in September 2019, it was mastered at Metropolis, London and scheduled for release in the new year to avoid the Christmas market. The album went on pre-sale on 10 January 2020 with the instant grat-track "The World We Left Behind" available immediately with pre-orders. The album was available on limited edition blue vinyl as well as standard black vinyl, CD and limited edition cassette tape.

On 30 January 2020, "Winning Ways" was released from the album, debuting with BBC Radio 2 exclusive. The video premiered the next day on the Bucks Fizz VEVO channel. On 28 February the track "T.O.T.P." was released with an accompanying music video which pays comedic homage to the BBC show Top of the Pops.

On 6 March 2020 the album was released and entered the overall Official Albums Chart at No.29, the UK Sales Chart at No.6, the UK Vinyl Chart at No.5 and the Independent Chart at No.3. The album also scored the No.6 position on the Official Scottish Album Charts.

Of the album Classic Pop Magazine said "The Fizz are back firing on all cylinders with Smoke & Mirrors – an album of shiny new pop bangers, the latest fruit of a fertile collaboration with legendary hitmaker Mike Stock". Commenting on the songs, it said that "All We Ever Can Do" and "Boomerang" illustrate the group's "extraordinary resilience", while "The World We Left Behind" sees them "laying to rest a few old ghosts".

== Track listing ==
All songs written by Mike Stock and Johan Kalel, except where indicated.

1. "Winning Ways" – 2:45
2. "All We Ever Can Do" – 4:05
3. "T.O.T.P." – 3:02
4. "From Here to Eternity" (Stock, Matt Aitken) – 3:20
5. "More than These Words" – 3:29
6. "Reservation" – 3:32
7. "The World We Left Behind" – 3:54
8. "Nothing's Gonna Last Forever" – 3:25
9. "Second to None" – 3:39
10. "Storm" (Kalel, Kyla Stroud) – 3:45
11. "Boomerang" (Jay Aston) – 3:04

== Personnel ==
- Cheryl Baker – vocals
- Jay Aston – vocals, album artistic director
- Mike Nolan – vocals
- Mike Stock – producer, instruments
- Jimmy Junior – producer, instruments
- Big Eared Boys – mixers
- Dave Colquhoun – guitar on tracks 1 and 2
- Chris Lyndon – engineer
- Joseph Sinclair – photography
- Jay Aston – album design
- MPG – artwork and layout

== Charts ==
Chart performance for Smoke & Mirrors
Chart (2020)	Peak position
Scottish Albums (OCC)	6
UK Albums (OCC)	29
UK Independent Albums (OCC)	3
