= Go go =

Go go or Gogo may refer to:

== Geography ==
- Ghogha, India, a town once also known as Gogo
- Gogo, Boulkiemdé, Burkina Faso, a town
- Gogo, Zoundwéogo, Burkina Faso, a city
- Gogo Department, a department in central Burkina Faso
- Gogo Formation, a fossil reef formation in Western Australia
- Gogo Station, a pastoral lease in the Kimberley of Western Australia

== Science ==
- Gogo (fish), a genus of Anchariid catfish
- Gogo Fish (disambiguation), two species of fish fossils found in the Gogo Formation in Western Australia

== Arts and entertainment ==
=== Fictional characters ===
- Gogo (Final Fantasy), from the Super Nintendo role-playing games Final Fantasy V and VI
- Crime Master Gogo, criminal in the 1994 Indian film Andaaz Apna Apna
- Ebu Gogo, creatures in the mythology of the people of the island of Flores, Indonesia
- Estragon, or Gogo, from Samuel Beckett's Waiting for Godot
- Gogo Dodo, from Tiny Toon Adventures
- Gogo Germain, from the film St. Louis Blues (1958)
- GoGo Tomago, from Big Hero 6
- Gogo Yubari, from Kill Bill: Volume 1

=== Games and toys ===
- Gogo's Crazy Bones, or simply Gogo's, a children's game and toy
- Go Go Pets, former name of ZhuZhu Pets, American line of toys

=== Music ===
- Go-go, a form of funk music that arose in the 1970s
- Gogo (Quebec music), a type of Quebec dance music of the 1960s
- The Go-Go's, a 1980s American all female rock band
- The Go-Go's (British band), a 1960s British band
- GO!GO!7188 or Gogo, a Japanese indie-rock band
- Gogo (Canadian musician), keyboardist for the rock band Trooper
- David Gogo, Canadian blues musician
- "Go-Go" (Alphabeat song)
- "Go Go", a song from the 1996 album Coolin' Off by the band Galactic
- "Go Go", a song from the 2000 album Bridging the Gap by the Black Eyed Peas
- GoGo Penguin, British jazz-electronica band from Manchester
- "고민보다 Go" (Go Go), a song by South Korean boy band BTS from the 2017 EP Love Yourself: Her

== People ==
- Gogo (mayor of the palace), 6th-century Frankish mayor of the palace of Austrasia
- Gogo people or Wagogo, a Bantu ethnic group in central Tanzania
- Lilian Gogo, Kenyan politician
- Gogos (surname)
- Zoltán Gőgös, Hungarian politician

== Other uses ==
- Gogo language, a Bantu language spoken by the Gogo people
- Gogo, a name for a hair tie
- Gogo Inflight Internet, a commercial in-flight broadband internet service
  - Gogo Business Aviation, a division of Gogo Inflight Internet
- Capital City Go-Go, a basketball team in the NBA G League

== See also ==
- Go Go Go (disambiguation)
- Go-go dancing, a form of nightclub entertainment
- Go-go boot, a style of boots associated with Go-go dancers
- Gugu (disambiguation)
- À gogo (disambiguation)
- Goggomobil, a former German car maker
- Angelica Gogos (born 1989), Australian rules footballer playing in the AFL Women's competition
- Basil Gogos (1929-2017), American illustrator
- Gogogogo, a rural municipality in Madagascar
