= Go Go Go =

Go Go Go or alike may refer to:

== Books ==
- "Go, Go, Go, Said the Bird" a short story by Sonya Dorman from Harlan Ellison's science fiction anthology Dangerous Visions
- Go! Go! Go!: The SAS. The Iranian Embassy Siege. The True Story, 2011, by Will Pearson and Rusty Firmin

== TV ==
- The Go!Go!Go! Show, a British family music theatre show
- Drama Go! Go! Go!, Chinese romance drama

== Music ==
- Go!Go!Go! (band), British musical group
- Go!!GO!GO!Go!! eighth studio album by Japanese rock band GO!GO!7188

=== Songs ===
- "Go! Go! Go!", song by The Treniers, 1951
- "Go Go Go Go", written by Mack David and Jerry Livingston and popularized by Dean Martin, 1951
- "Go Go Go" (Roy Orbison song), 1956
- "Go Go Go" (Chuck Berry song), 1961, based on the Johnny B. Goode song character
- "Go, Go, Go! (This Is It)", by Rip Rig + Panic, 1981
- "Go! Go! Go!", a B-side to "You and Me" by One Night Only, 2007
- "Go Go Go!", a B-side to "Bye Bye Bye!" by Cute
- "Go Go Go", by Capitol K, 2008
- "Go Go Go!" (Lethal Bizzle song), 2010
- "Go Go Go" (Sleeping With Sirens song), 2015
- "Go Go Go", a song by CG5 (musician)

== See also ==
- Go go (disambiguation)
