= Goo =

Goo or GOO may refer to:

== Arts and entertainment ==
- Goo (album), by the band Sonic Youth
- "Goo", a song by Gen Hoshino from Baka no Uta
- Goo (Gumby character), a character on The Gumby Show
- Goo (Foster's Home for Imaginary Friends), a character on Foster's Home for Imaginary Friends
- Great Old One, in the work of H. P. Lovecraft
- Guardians of Order, a defunct Canadian producer of role-playing games
- Milton "Goo" Berry, a character on the television show My Brother and Me

== People ==
- Goo Arlooktoo (1963–2002), Canadian politician and cabinet minister
- Goo Kennedy (1949–2020), American professional basketball player
- Ah Chew Goo (1918–2015), American basketball player and coach
- Goo Hara (1991–2019), South Korean singer and actress
- Goo Hye Sun (born 1984), South Korean actress
- Goo Kim Fui (1835–1908), Chinese merchant and philanthropist
- Maurene Goo, American author

== Science and technology ==
- Goo (search engine), an Internet search engine and web portal based in Japan
- Gaspergou, a North American fish also known as goo fish
- Gastric outlet obstruction, a medical condition where the outflow of the stomach is blocked

== Other uses ==
- Goo language, spoken in Ivory Coast
- Gone Dau language, spoken in eastern Fiji, ISO 639 language code goo
- Guarantee of origin (GoO), an energy certificate EU regulation

== See also ==
- Gray goo, a hypothetical end-of-the-world scenario involving molecular nanotechnology
- Gu (disambiguation)
- Goo goo (disambiguation)
