= Brooks (band) =

1970s British musical group

- Origin: London, England
- Genres: Pop
- Years active: 1976–1980
- Label: Polydor
- Past members: Mike Nolan; Chris Hamill; Peter Pereira; Ricky Gallahad; John Humphreys; Ben Ellison

Brooks was a London-based vocal pop group active in the late 1970s. Despite much hype and a number of single releases, the band failed to achieve any chart success. Two of the members however went on to achieve fame independently of each other: Mike Nolan, of Bucks Fizz, and Chris Hamill, a.k.a. Limahl, of Kajagoogoo.

== History ==
The group was put together in 1976 by manager Freya Miller and husband Peter Pereira. Miller had previously worked with The New Seekers, and Pereira had been a member of pop band Co-Co. They recruited singers Mike Nolan, Chris Hamill, and Ricky Gallahad through ads in The Melody Maker and The Stage, to complete the line-up with Pereira.

In 1978 Hamill was replaced by John Humphreys. Shortly after, the group signed a contract with Polydor Records. Tony Eyers, who had worked with the group 5000 Volts, was hired as producer. The first single, released in 1979, was "The Sound of Your Love", with Pereira singing the lead. Nolan's voice was featured in the second single, "Cry (Till My Eyes Run Dry)". Both singles were arranged by Steve Gray. Despite television appearances on ITV's The Saturday Morning Show, The Dick Emery Show, and the BBC's Lena Zavaroni and Music, neither of the group's first singles made an entry into the pop charts.

Roger Greenaway took over as producer for the group in late 1979. Greenaway had written a string of hits with Roger Cook, including "Long Cool Woman in a Black Dress" and "I'd Like to Teach the World to Sing". Brooks' next single was "What a Great Night For Making Love", a Greenaway/Barry Mason composition. The BBC expressed reservations over the title and lyrics, so the single was re-recorded as "What a Great Night for Falling in Love". Once again, Nolan sang the lead. By 1980, singer Gallahad had been replaced by Ben Ellison.

The group released two more singles written and produced by Greenaway; "Don't You Know a Lady (When You See One)?", featuring Nolan, and "We Are United", with Humphreys taking the lead. The single "Don't You Know a Lady" was also released by former Sweet lead singer, Brian Connolly. In the end, neither artist made much progress with it in the charts.

During this time, the group continued to promote themselves with television appearances and radio interviews. The members appeared individually on the covers of Oh Boy! magazine. In 1980, the group travelled to Yugoslavia as the UK entry in the Ljubljana '80 song festival, which was telecast over most of Europe. Despite these efforts, none of the group's later singles fared any better than their previous offerings, when it came to breaking into the charts.

== Split and aftermath ==
After considerable investment, and two years without a hit, Polydor declined to take up the options on their contract. Miller's interest in Brooks waned after she split with Pereira, and began managing Shakin' Stevens. The members had little in common musically or personally, and without their contractual obligations holding them together, they split.

Mike Nolan went on to success with Bucks Fizz, winning the Eurovision Song Contest in 1981, with "Making Your Mind Up". Chris Hamill, transformed into Limahl, had a worldwide hit with "Too Shy", with Kajagoogoo in 1983, as well as with his solo record "The NeverEnding Story", the theme song to the film of the same name. Ben Ellison returned to his acting career, appearing on stage and television, and in film. His best-known work is his lead role in the 1989 film Looking for Langston. John Humphreys performed at folk clubs and on radio with "Home and Colonial" before returning to his native Canada in 1981.

== Discography ==
Singles: (all released on Polydor Records)

- March 1979: "Sound of Our Love"
- May 1979: "Cry (Till My Eyes Run Dry)"
- November 1979: "What a Great Night for Making Love"
- March 1980: "Don't You Know a Lady (When You See One)?"
- September 1980: "We Are United"
