= Everything Under the Sun (The Fizz album) =

2022 studio album by The Fizz

Studio album by the Fizz
- Released: 4 November 2022
- Studios: MPG, Surrey
- Genre: Pop
- Length: 33:54
- Label: MPG
- Producers: Mike Stock; Jimmy Junior

The Fizz chronology
Smoke & Mirrors (2020)	Everything Under the Sun (2022)

Everything Under the Sun is a 2022 studio album by The Fizz, formerly Bucks Fizz. It is the fourth album by the group under the name The Fizz and the third as a threesome consisting of original members Cheryl Baker, Mike Nolan and Jay Aston. It was released on 8 September 2022 on CD, vinyl and digital download via their official website. The album was produced by Mike Stock.

== Promotion ==
The Fizz promoted the album across television and radio, including Rylan's BBC Radio 2 show, Talk Radio, as well as a 40th anniversary gig at London's Indigo O2.

== Track listing ==
Everything Under the Sun track listing
No.	Title	Length
1.	"I Wonder Where You Are Right Now"	2:47
2.	"Everything We Do (We Do It for You)"	2:52
3.	"A True Heart"	3:42
4.	"When Is Our Luck Gonna Change"	3:55
5.	"I Close My Eyes"	2:51
6.	"Treasure Forever"	4:04
7.	"You Can Find It Here"	3:37
8.	"Pretty Soon"	2:30
9.	"I'm on My Way (Better Run)"	3:48
10.	"This One"	3:48
Total length:		33:54

== Charts ==
Chart performance for Everything Under the Sun
Chart (2022–2023)	Peak position
UK Album Downloads (Official Charts)	42
UK Independent Albums (Official Charts)	25
