= Everything Under the Sun =

Everything Under the Sun may refer to:

- Everything Under the Sun (box set), a 2006 box set by Sublime
- Everything Under the Sun (Jukebox the Ghost album), 2010
- Everything Under the Sun (The Fizz album), 2022
- Everything Under the Sun (Nickelback album), 2026
