= Goo goo =

Goo goo may refer to:

- Goo-goos, a style of "good government" activists
- GooGoo Cluster, a candybar by the Standard Candy Company of Tennessee, US
- Goo Goo Dolls, an American rock band
- Goo Goo Gaga, a character in the animated TV show Foster's Home for Imaginary Friends
- A common slang used for baby talk
- Goo Goo Goliath, a 1954 Warner Bros. Merrie Melodies short film

== See also ==
- Goo (disambiguation)
- Gugu (disambiguation)
