= Mike Nolan (singer) =

Irish singer (born 1954)

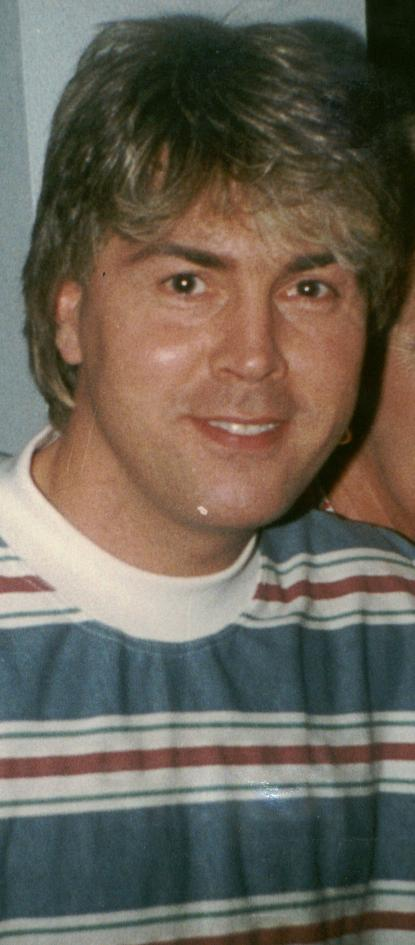
- Nolan in 1991

Background information
- Born: Michael Nolan; 7 December 1954 (age 71); Dublin, Ireland
- Genres: Pop
- Occupation: Singer
- Instrument: Vocals
- Years active: 1976–present
- Labels: RCA; Polydor
- Member of: The Fizz
- Formerly of: Brooks; Bucks Fizz

Michael Nolan (born 7 December 1954) is an Irish singer who is best known as one of the four original members of the British pop group, Bucks Fizz, who now perform as The Fizz. He was born in Dublin, Ireland, but brought up in the UK, where he still resides. As a member of Bucks Fizz, he won the 1981 Eurovision Song Contest and achieved 20 UK top 60 singles between 1981 and 1988, including three number one hits. He was a member of the group until 1996. Since 2004, he has been a member of the group The Fizz, along with other former Bucks Fizz members Cheryl Baker, Shelley Preston (from 2004 to 2009) and Jay Aston (since 2009).

== Early career ==
Mike Nolan began performing in the mid-1970s in pubs around London, playing the guitar and singing mostly old Irish ballads. He was also auditioning for a variety of groups as a vocalist.

It was in 1976 that he successfully auditioned for his first serious band. This group went under the name Brooks and were put together by Freya Miller, who went on to manage Shakin' Stevens. The group was a four-piece boyband, consisting of Nolan, Ben Ellison (who replaced Ricky Gallahad), John Humphreys and Peter Pereira. They were designed to be a 1970s version of The Monkees. Originally the group also included Chris Hamill, who went on to become famous as Limahl. Despite multiple TV appearances, magazine interviews and several singles, the group never had a hit and eventually disbanded three years later.

In 1980, Nolan was contacted by composer/manager Nichola Martin. She had a song entitled "Making Your Mind Up", which had been composed by her boyfriend, Andy Hill, and was intending to enter it for the heats to the 1981 Eurovision Song Contest. The demo was recorded by Nolan and Martin and was accepted as one of the finalists. Martin then worked on finding other singers to build a group around him.

== Bucks Fizz ==
Nolan along with singers Bobby G, Cheryl Baker and Jay Aston became known as Bucks Fizz. In March, they won the 1981 A Song for Europe with "Making Your Mind Up". On Saturday 4 April, they won the Eurovision final itself. The group were catapulted to fame overnight and the song reached No.1 in several countries, including the UK.

Over the next few years, Bucks Fizz became one of the biggest pop groups in the UK with several hit singles and albums, including two more No.1 hits, "The Land of Make Believe" and "My Camera Never Lies". Nolan gained critical acclaim for his lead vocal on the top ten hit "Now Those Days Are Gone".

While on tour on 11 December 1984, Bucks Fizz were involved in a coach crash. The tour bus they were travelling in crashed into a lorry and all four members were injured, but Nolan was most seriously affected when he fell into a coma and at one point was given the Last Rites. Nolan was featured on the front page of several tabloid newspapers over the next few days with headlines declaring him to be "on the brink of death". After three days, he awoke and spent the next six months recuperating before returning to work with the group, although the effects of the crash still affect him today.

Bucks Fizz scored their last hit in 1988 and Nolan continued with the group (now in an altered line-up) until 1995.

== Later Bucks Fizz ==
In 1997, Nolan was contacted by former Dollar singer David Van Day, with a view to forming a rival version of Bucks Fizz. Nolan agreed and the band began to tour. A year later, they released a single and recorded an album of old Bucks Fizz hits. Former bandmate, G was unhappy with the competition and threatened to sue Van Day, while Bucks Fizz fans were almost universal in their derision of the new recordings. The group continued for a few years until Nolan too became unhappy with the situation and quit in 2001. He also filed a lawsuit against Van Day for unpaid earnings, and although he won the case, he received no payout as Van Day declared himself bankrupt.

In 2004, Nolan along with Baker, G and another later member of Bucks Fizz, Shelley Preston reformed for a one-off series of shows on the 80s revival Here and Now Tour. Following this, Nolan was keen to continue and so along with Baker and Preston, they formed a three-piece version of the group, officially called The Original Bucks Fizz. Nolan continued to perform with original Bucks Fizz members Cheryl Baker and Jay Aston under the name The Fizz. Mike Nolan released his first solo album in early 2013 entitled In My Life. He has since recorded a second album. The Fizz undertook an extensive UK tour throughout 2015.

In 2017, The Fizz released their first album in many years under the new name, The F–Z of Pop, which reached the Top 30 in the UK charts. in 2018, the band released Christmas with the Fizz, followed by Smoke & Mirrors in 2018 and Everything Under the Sun in 2022.

On 5 May 2024, Nolan announced his departure from The Fizz. Mike Nolan told Michael Ball on BBC Radio 2, "I have decided to go, to leave. I've been thinking about it for a long long, long time and I just thought: 'this is the time to do it". Nolan also cited the long travelling having taken its toll on him over the past 43 years. He would continue to perform with The Fizz until the end of the year, including a gig at London's O2 Indigo in June.

== Other activities ==
Outside of the group, Nolan is a staunch supporter of the charity HeadFirst, which was set up as a result of the 1984 coach crash and specifically Nolan's head injuries. His support for this charity also incorporates The Mike Nolan Brain Damage Fund, which was co-created by fellow member Baker. Both continue to raise money for the charity. Other activities outside of Bucks Fizz include appearing on stage in a number of pantomimes, starring Adam Button.
