= Gugu =

Gugu may refer to: Elijah

== Geography ==
- Gugu, tributary of the Șes in Caraș-Severin County, Romania
- Güğü, Dursunbey, a village in Turkey
- Gugu Thaypan language, Paman language spoken on the southwestern part of the Cape York Peninsula, Queensland, Australia
- Gugu Uwanh dialect, Paman language spoken on the Cape York Peninsula of Queensland, Australia
- Mount Gugu, mountain located in central Ethiopia

== People ==
- Gugu, alternative spelling of Gyges of Lydia (reigned c.687–c.652 BCE)
- Costinel Gugu (born 1992), Romanian footballer
- Gugu Gill (also spelt Guggu Gill), Indian actor in Punjabi cinema
- Gugu Mbatha-Raw (born 1983), English actress
- Gugu Liberato (1959–2019), Brazilian TV presenter
- Gugu (Oz), a fictional leopard character in The Magic of Oz
- Carlos Gustavo Moreira, (born 1973), Brazilian mathematician known as Gugu
- Gugu (footballer) (born 1985), Luis Miguel Aparecido Alves, Brazilian footballer

== See also ==
- Go go (disambiguation)
- Goo goo (disambiguation)
