= The Fizz =

British pop music group

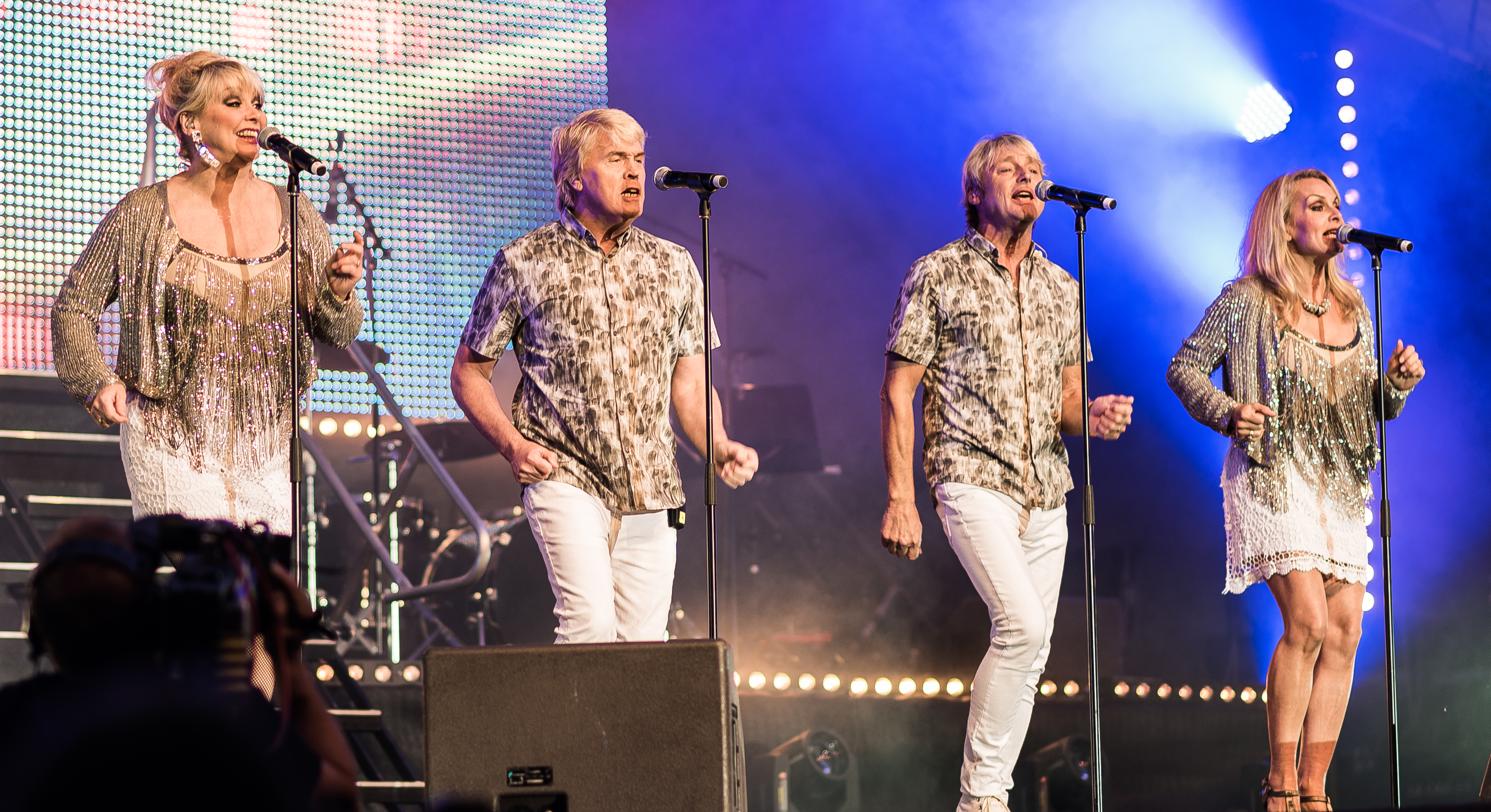
- The Fizz in 2015

Background information
- Also known as: The Original Bucks Fizz; Cheryl, Mike & Jay; Formerly of Bucks Fizz
- Origin: United Kingdom
- Genres: Pop; pop-rock; MOR; jazz
- Years active: 2004–present
- Spinoff of: Bucks Fizz
- Members: Cheryl Baker; Jay Aston; Matthew Pateman; Nikk Mager
- Past members: Mike Nolan; Shelley Preston; Stephen Fox; Bobby McVay
- Website: thefizzofficial.com

The Fizz are a British pop music group formed in 2004 as a spin-off from the original group, Bucks Fizz. For many years the core of the group consisted of Cheryl Baker, Mike Nolan and Jay Aston, who are all former members of Bucks Fizz and performed as OBF (Original Bucks Fizz) initially with Shelley Preston and then replaced by Jay Aston. The group then performed as Formerly of Bucks Fizz, and Bobby McVay later became a member in 2015, making the group a quartet, and then renaming as The Fizz until he left in 2018. To date, the group have released four albums, three of which have charted in the Official UK Albums Chart. Their 2017 album The F-Z of Pop reached No.25, becoming the highest-charting Bucks Fizz related album in 33 years. In 2018, Christmas with the Fizz was released. In 2020, Smoke & Mirrors was released, reaching number 29 in the Official UK Albums Chart and number 6 on the Official Sales Chart. In May 2024, Mike Nolan announced his departure from the group effective later in the year. He was replaced by singers Matthew Pateman and Nikk Mager, making the group a quartet again.

== The Original Bucks Fizz ==
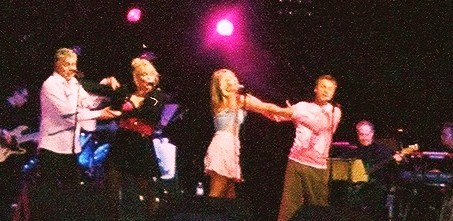
Mike Nolan, Cheryl Baker, Shelley Preston & Bobby G at Wembley Arena in 2004

In December 2004, Bobby G, Mike Nolan, Cheryl Baker and Shelley Preston reformed briefly after 15 years apart to be part of 'The Here and Now Tour' of the UK. To distinguish this line-up from G's other group, they renamed themselves The Original Bucks Fizz (although Preston was not in the original four, she was the only other member to have been in a recording contract with chart success whilst in the group). Due to prior commitments with the current lineup of the group, G could not make all of the dates played, but did appear at some shows. Following this, Nolan, Baker and Preston subsequently performed more shows together as a three-piece under the same title and featured in the Congratulations show, the 50th Anniversary of the Eurovision Song Contest in Copenhagen. In September 2008, Preston, Baker, Nolan and Aston reunited for a makeover show Pop Goes the Band for Living TV, which was screened in March 2009.

In April 2009, Preston left The Original Bucks Fizz. Soon after it was announced that original member Jay Aston would be joining Baker and Nolan in the group for live shows — the first time she has been a part of Bucks Fizz since 1985. In October 2009, this line-up embarked on their first tour, encompassing 10 venues across the UK as well as a special gig at Newcastle to commemorate the 25th anniversary of their coach crash. The group released their debut single on 24 May 2010, which was a jazz-style reworking of their hit "I Hear Talk". In January 2011, while preparing for a 30th anniversary tour, The Original Bucks Fizz became caught up in a legal conflict with Bobby G over the use of the Bucks Fizz name. Baker, Nolan and Aston sought legal advice over the matter.

A mini 30th Anniversary tour took place in May 2011, while a larger scale gig took place at the London Palladium on 11 July 2011 to celebrate their 30 years. The group also recorded their debut album, Fame & Fortune?, which was a new studio album comprising six reworked Bucks Fizz tracks along with six original tracks composed by the group. The first of these, "This Day is Mine" was premiered at the May gigs and was also played on BBC Radio. The release of the album was put on hold until after the court case verdict.

A hearing between The Original Bucks Fizz and Bobby G took place on 15 July 2011. On 22 August 2011 the judge found in favour of G with the reasoning that since his wife (Heidi Manton, also a member of his group) owned the Bucks Fizz name, the use of the name The Original Bucks Fizz was an impediment on their trademark. The Original Bucks Fizz sent an appeal to the high courts but was subsequently dropped.

=== OBF ===
On 3 April 2012, the group re-launched as OBF. They performed some shows around the weekend of the 2012 Eurovision Song Contest and released the debut album on Saturday 26 May. It was made available through their official website. During 2014, the group rebranded as Cheryl, Mike and Jay - Formerly of Bucks Fizz. In 2014, the group gained a temporary fourth member, singer Stephen Fox who had been a member of their supporting band at live shows. In 2015, the group embarked on an extensive tour of the UK, now officially as a four-piece with former vocalist of 1980s group Sweet Dreams, Bobby McVay. This was the group's biggest undertaking with more than 40 dates throughout the year, ending on 30 October 2015.

=== The Fizz (2016–present) ===
On 1 April 2016, the group, including McVay, performed at the London Hippodrome theatre to celebrate 35 years since Bucks Fizz won Eurovision. A UK tour titled "Make Believe Tour 2016" took place during 2016. In December 2016 the group released a re-recording of Bucks Fizz's biggest hit, "The Land of Make Believe", produced by Mike Stock. The limited edition CD sold out on pre-release. This was followed by a digital download version.

Rebranded "The Fizz" the group released an album The F-Z of Pop via Pledge Music in September 2017. The album, also produced by Mike Stock, contains three re-imagined Bucks Fizz tracks and eight original songs, some co-written by the band, one written by band member Cheryl's daughter. The album entered the charts at No.25, their highest chart position for 31 years. The group also performed a third tour throughout 2017 and released three singles during the year.

In February 2018, McVay departed from the group as, living in Italy, he found it challenging to be constantly travelling between the UK and Italy. Baker, Nolan and Aston decided to continue to perform as a trio until they find a replacement.

In June 2018, Aston was diagnosed with mouth cancer and was to undergo surgery in July to have part of her tongue replaced. By November she had returned to performing with the group. Before her surgery she completed her vocals for the group's next album Christmas with the Fizz. Consisting of Christmas standards and original tracks with a festive theme, this was released in November 2018 and entered the UK albums chart at No.93.

In 2019, the group recorded a third studio album, Smoke & Mirrors, which was released in the UK and digital platforms on 6 March 2020. The album was released on CD, standard vinyl, limited edition blue vinyl and cassette.

On 19 August 2022, the group announced that their fourth studio album would be called Everything Under the Sun. It was released on 8 September 2022 and was once again produced by Mike Stock. It was released on CD, vinyl and digital download via their official website.

In May 2024, Nolan announced he would be leaving the band at the end of the year due to "personal reasons". He told Michael Ball on BBC Radio 2: "I have decided to go, to leave. I've been thinking about it for a long long, long time and I just thought: 'this is the time to do it'." Nolan continued to perform with the Fizz until the end of the year. On 3 October 2024 it was announced during Scott Mills' Radio 2 show that Matthew Pateman (Bad Boys Inc, Let Loose) and Nikk Mager (Phixx) would be joining the band, thus becoming a quartet again.

In May 2026 The Fizz released their single 'A Crazy Shot in the Dark' which like previous songs was produced by Mike Stock. It peaked at number 31 on the Official UK Charts and number 27 on the Official Singles Downloads Chart. Whilst promoting the single on breakfast television, Cheryl hinted at the hope for a new album to follow.

== Members ==
- Mike Nolan (2004–2024)
- Cheryl Baker (2004–present)
- Shelley Preston (2004–2009)
- Jay Aston (2009–present)
- Stephen Fox (2014)
- Bobby McVay (2015–2018)
- Matthew Pateman (2024–present)
- Nikk Mager (2024–present)

== Discography ==
=== Albums ===
List of albums, with selected details and peak chart positions
Title	Album details	Peak chart positions			
Title	Album details	UK	SCO	UK Sales	UK Ind.
Fame and Fortune? (as OBF)	Released: May 2012	—	—	—	—
The F–Z of Pop	Released: 22 September 2017	25	23	14	6
Christmas with the Fizz	Released: 16 November 2018	93	65	54	9
Smoke & Mirrors	Released: 6 March 2020	29	6	6	3
Everything Under the Sun	Released: 8 September 2022	—	—	—	25

=== Singles ===
List of singles
Title	Year	Album
"I Hear Talk" (live)	2010	Non-album singles
"The Land of Make Believe 2016"	2016	Non-album singles
"Dancing in the Rain"	2017	The F-Z of Pop
"Amen"	2017	The F-Z of Pop
"Home for My Heart" (featuring Rick Wakeman)	2017	The F-Z of Pop
"Up for the Fight"	2018	The F-Z of Pop
"Don't Start Without Me"	2018	Christmas with the Fizz
"Don't Start Without Me" (2019 Radio Edit)	2019	Christmas with the Fizz
"Winning Ways"	2020	Smoke & Mirrors
"TOTP" (promo)	2020	Smoke & Mirrors
"From Here to Eternity" (promo)	2020	Smoke & Mirrors
"The World We Left Behind"	2020	Smoke & Mirrors
"Everything We Do (We Do It for You)"	2022	Everything Under the Sun
"This One"	2022	Everything Under the Sun
"Treasure Forever"	2023	Everything Under the Sun
"A Crazy Shot in the Dark"	2026	
