= The F–Z of Pop =

The F-Z of Pop

Studio album by The Fizz
- Released: 22 September 2017
- Recorded: 2016–17
- Studio: MPG Studios, London, UK
- Genre: Pop
- Label: MPG Records
- Producer: Mike Stock; Jimmy Junior

The Fizz chronology
Fame and Fortune? (2012)	The F-Z of Pop (2017)	Christmas with the Fizz (2018)

Singles from The Fizz
- 1. "Dancing In The Rain" Released: August 2017; 2. "Amen" Released: October 2017; 3. "Home for My Heart (Festive Mix)" Released: December 2017; 4. "Up for the Fight" Released: February 2018

The F–Z of Pop is a studio album by British pop group The Fizz, released in 2017. It is the second album by the group (the previous album being released under the name OBF) and the first by the four-member line up of Cheryl Baker, Jay Aston, Mike Nolan and Bobby McVay. Released in September, the album entered the UK albums chart at No.25, the highest chart position achieved by a Bucks Fizz line-up since the "New Beginning (Mamba Seyra)" single in 1986, 31 years earlier.

== Background ==
By 2015, The Original Bucks Fizz, a group featuring original Bucks Fizz members Cheryl Baker, Jay Aston and Mike Nolan had been in operation since 2009. It was in this year that they became a four-piece (as per the classic line-up of the 1980s) with the inclusion of former Sweet Dreams member Bobby McVay. The group undertook a series of live dates across the UK throughout 2016 and towards the end of the year decided on recording a new album with acclaimed 1980s producer Mike Stock. Having been a fan of the group in their 1980s heyday, Stock was keen to work with the group and work began on a number of Stock's own compositions along with some written by members of the band and a reworking of three classic Bucks Fizz tracks. The album was touted as being the group's first album in over 30 years (referring to the last Bucks Fizz studio album). Of the album, member Cheryl Baker said: "I cannot tell you how happy I am to have been back in the studio, my favourite place and with the genius that is Mike Stock. I am so proud of this new album and I know Fizz fans will love it too!"

In August 2017, the first single was released from the album, "Dancing in the Rain". The following month, the album was released under the title The F-Z of Pop following a successful Pledge Music campaign. Featuring eight new compositions, three reworkings of old Bucks Fizz songs and four alternate versions, the album was well received by the group's fans and sold well-enough to score a UK top 30 placing, entering the chart at No.25. This was the first chart entry by the group and the highest chart entry of any Bucks Fizz line-up since the Bucks Fizz single "New Beginning (Mamba Seyra)" peaked at No.8 in 1986 and in the albums chart it matched the peak of their Greatest Hits album in early 1984. The album charted even higher on the sales-only chart, entering the chart at No.14, a position only beaten once by a Bucks Fizz album (1982's Are You Ready). It also charted at No.23 in the Scottish album chart. The album had a mid-week chart position in the UK at No.11. It was BBC Radio 2's album of the week by Ken Bruce.

The track "Home for My Heart" was written by member Jay Aston with her guitarist husband Dave Colquhoun, "There's No Turning Back" was written by members Mike Nolan and Bobby McVay, while "Amen" was written by Cheryl Baker's daughter, Kyla. The latter was voted the best song on the album by the group's fans in a Twitter poll. The album cover shows the group dressed in plaid striking puppet poses, a concept imagined by member Jay Aston in a nod to their manufactured origins. The album's launch was heralded by appearances on TV and in the press. A vinyl version of the album was released on 13 October 2017 featuring ten tracks, including the previously unreleased song "I Am the Beat".

In October, a second single was released from the album, the track "Amen". The single received a high profile due to being playlisted on Radio 2 for several weeks, reaching the station's airplay top 20. They also promoted the song on television, performing it on Lorraine for example. Classic Pop Magazine gave the song a rave review calling it "brilliant" and saying that it was "moody, pounding [and] melodious".

A third single was released by the end of the year; a festive-themed version of "Home for My Heart", featuring piano by Rick Wakeman, while the fourth and final single "Up for the Fight" was released in February 2018.

== Track listing ==
CD

1. "Up for the Fight" (Mike Stock / Johan Kalel) 3:23
2. "Break the Ice" (Stock / Kalel) 3:17
3. "Where I'm Gonna Be" (Stock / Kalel) 2:39
4. "Home for My Heart" (Stock / Jay Aston / Dave Colquhoun) 3:39
5. "Dancing in the Rain (Stock / Kalel) 3:05
6. "Control Freak" (Stock / Kalel) 3:24
7. "There's No Turning Back" (Stock / Bobby McVay / Mike Nolan) 3:17
8. "Amen" (Kyla Stroud) 3:23
9. "My Camera Never Lies 2017" (Andy Hill / Nichola Martin) 3:48
10. "Piece of the Action 2017" (Hill) 3:37
11. "The Land of Make Believe 2017" (Hill / Peter Sinfield) 3:35
12. "Up for the Fight (extended version)" (Stock / Kalel) 4:48
13. "Break the Ice (extended version) (Stock / Kalel) 4:59
14. "Piece of the Action 2017 (extended version)" (Hill) 5:39
15. "My Camera Never Lies 2017 (karaoke version)" (Hill / Martin) 3:52

Vinyl

Side One

1. "Up for the Fight" (Stock / Kalel) 3:23
2. "Break the Ice" (Stock / Kalel) 3:17
3. "Where I'm Gonna Be" (Stock / Kalel) 2:39
4. "Home for My Heart" (Stock / Aston / Colquhoun) 3:39
5. "Dancing in the Rain (Stock / Kalel) 3:05

Side Two

1. "Control Freak" (Stock / Kalel) 3:24
2. "There's No Turning Back" (Stock / McVay / Nolan) 3:17
3. "Amen" (Stroud) 3:23
4. "I Am the Beat" (Jonny Whetstone / Mick Bass) 2:57
5. "My Camera Never Lies 2017" (Hill / Martin) 3:48

== Personnel ==
- Cheryl Baker – vocals
- Jay Aston – vocals, album artistic director
- Mike Nolan – vocals
- Bobby McVay – vocals
- Mike Stock – producer, instruments
- Jimmy Junior – producer, instruments
- Big Eared Boys – mixers
- Dave Colquhoun – guitar on tracks 3 and 4
- Chris Lyndon – engineer
- Matt Parisi – engineer on tracks 9, 10, 11, 14, 15
- Claire Domiic – photography
- Phil Gardner – album design
- Kate Stretton – artwork and layout

== Chart positions ==
Country	Peak position
UK	25
Scotland	23
UK Sales	14
