= Eggs 'n' Baker =

1988 British children's television series

- Genre: Children's
- Presented by: Cheryl Baker
- Country of origin: United Kingdom
- Original language: English
- No. of series: 4

Production
- Production company: BBC Manchester

Original release
- Network: Children's BBC
- Release: 8 October 1988 – 17 April 1993

Eggs 'n' Baker is a Saturday morning Children's BBC music and cookery show presented by Bucks Fizz singer Cheryl Baker. It was often shown in the early morning slot before the magazine show Going Live!

During this time, Baker was still a member of Bucks Fizz and would often appear with the group on the show.

The show ran on BBC1 for four series from 1988 to 1993.
