= Shape Up and Dance =

Shut Up and Dance
- Jay Aston's Shape Up and Dance (Vol.7)

Compilation album by Various artists
- Released: 1982–1984
- Genre: Keep-fit music and instruction
- Label: Lifestyle Records

Shape Up and Dance was the umbrella name for a popular series of exercise instruction albums released in the United Kingdom between 1982 and 1984, during the 1980s aerobics craze. The albums were choreographed by Christina Brookes and each one was presented by a different well-known personality from the world of sport or entertainment. The music consisted of anonymous cover versions of hit records. The albums were released on vinyl and cassette. The first two albums in the collection sold well and enjoyed lengthy stays on the UK album charts, but the trend quickly lost impact.

The albums in the series were:

1. Felicity Kendal
2. Angela Rippon
3. Isla St Clair
4. Suzanne Danielle
5. Christina Brookes
6. Lulu
7. Jay Aston (singer with Bucks Fizz)
8. Suzanne Dando (athlete)
9. George Best and Mary Stavin
10. Patti Boulaye (singer)
