= Sweet Dreams (1980s band) =

British vocal trio

- Also known as: Dreams
- Origin: London, England
- Genres: Pop
- Years active: 1983
- Label: Ariola
- Members: Bobby McVay; Carrie Gray; Helen Kray

Sweet Dreams was a British vocal trio composed of Carrie Gray (later Grant), Helen Kray and Bobby McVay. This teen trio represented the UK in the Eurovision Song Contest 1983 with the song "I'm Never Giving Up".

== Overview ==
The band was put together specifically to perform "I'm Never Giving Up" in A Song for Europe 1983, the United Kingdom's preliminary round to the 1983 Eurovision Song Contest.

Sweet Dreams were often compared to the band Bucks Fizz, because they were both mixed-gender bands. Bucks Fizz was a band from the UK, which won the Eurovision Song Contest 1981 with the song "Making Your Mind Up." Bucks Fizz was the evident prototype for several acts entered in the 1982 UK edition of A Song for Europe—including "Lovin' Feeling," another A Song for Europe 1983 entrant. In 1982, "Lovin' Feeling" had featured McVay (in an otherwise female quartet) and had finished fourth with the song "Different Worlds, Different People."

=== A Song for Europe 1983 ===
Sweet Dreams was the first of the eight contestants to perform on the BBC-TV A Song for Europe broadcast live from the BBC Television Theatre on 24 March 1983. Based on the tally from eight regional juries, "I'm Never Giving Up" was named the UK entrant for Eurovision 1983, receiving 109 points. In second place was "We've got all the Time in the World" by the band Mirror (also composed of two females and one male), which received 91 points. This trio was formed of twins Tina & Sharon Enticott and Dave Lusher.

=== Eurovision 1983 ===
On the night of Eurovision 1983, held at Rudi-Sedlmayer-Halle in Munich, Sweet Dreams performed "I'm Never Giving Up" third in a field of twenty. They finished the contest in sixth place. In 2008, Carrie Gray (now known as Carrie Grant) stated "We came sixth, which actually at the time was really shameful, but these days that would be a serious result."

The sixth-place finish of "I'm Never Giving Up" at Eurovision 1983 largely replicated the UK' standing at Eurovision 1982 when "One Step Further" by Bardo had finished seventh: however while "One Step Further" had afforded Bardo a #2 UK hit "I'm Never Giving Up" rose no higher than #21 UK – in spite of a Top of the Pops appearance.

=== Later career ===
Sweet Dreams released a follow-up single "17 Electric (Look Out!)" in August 1983. To downplay the group's Eurovision association, the single was credited to "Dreams". However, "17 Electric (Look Out!)" failed to chart, precipitating the dissolution of the Sweet Dreams/Dreams trio by the end of 1983. Carrie Grant commented on the failure of "I'm Never Giving Up" to become a major hit or to afford Sweet Dreams any lasting success, saying, "Eurovision was so popular [in the UK] when I was growing up. It started to go off the boil [in 1983 when] there was a backlash for the first time."

"I'm Never Giving Up" also gave Sweet Dreams a Top 30 hit in Ireland (#25).

After the disbanding of the group, Grant (née Gray) went on to become a TV personality, as a vocal coach and judge on Fame Academy, along with appearances on various shows relating to the entertainment industry; while McVay became a radio presenter and later resumed his singing career when he joined The Fizz in 2015.

Preceded by Bardo with "One Step Further"	United Kingdom in the Eurovision Song Contest; 1983	Succeeded by Belle and the Devotions with "Love Games"
