= Mike Stock =

English songwriter, record producer (born 1951)

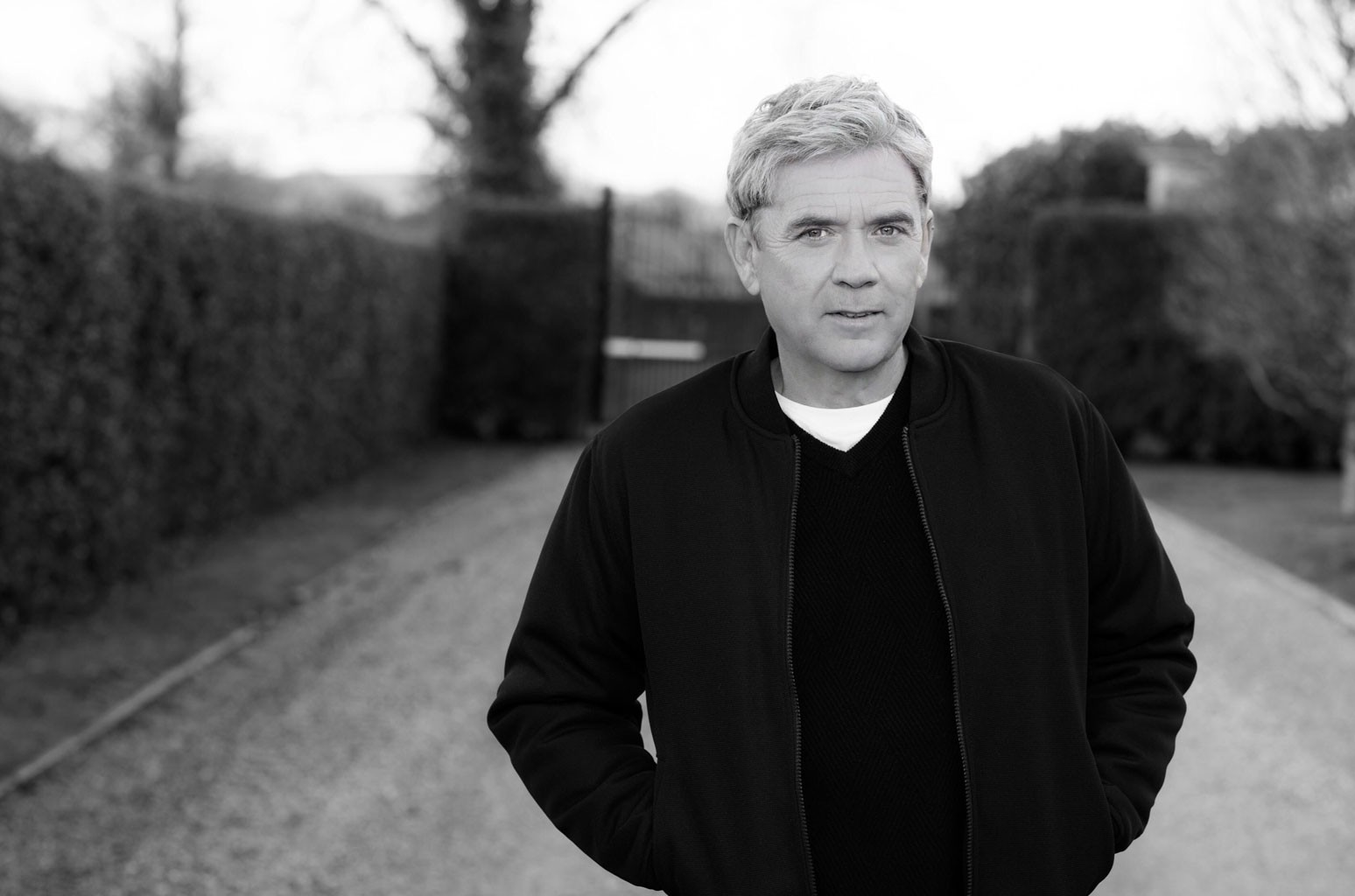
- Mike Stock, 2019

Background information
- Born: Michael Stock; 3 December 1951 (age 74); Margate, Kent, England, United Kingdom
- Genres: Pop; disco; dance-pop; electropop
- Occupations: Songwriter; record producer; musician
- Instruments: Piano; guitar; drums; vocals; bass guitar; electronic keyboard
- Years active: 1976–present
- Member of: Stock Aitken Waterman
- Website: mikestockmusic.com

Michael Stock (born 3 December 1951) is an English songwriter, record producer, musician, and member of the songwriting and production trio Stock Aitken Waterman. He has been responsible for over a hundred top-40 hits in the UK, including 16 number ones, and is recognised as one of the most successful songwriters of all time by the Guinness World Records. As part of Stock Aitken Waterman in the 1980s and 1990s, Stock holds the UK record of eleven number-one records with different acts. On the UK singles chart, he has written 54 top-ten hits, including seven number ones.

== Biography ==
Stock was born in Margate, Kent, England in 1951, and grew up in Swanley, Kent. He attended White Oak primary school and Swanley comprehensive school. At Swanley, he was involved in several school variety productions. He was self-taught in playing the piano and guitar and began writing songs at the age of seven. Inspired by the Beatles, he soon became fixated with pop music and put together his first band at age 13, playing bass guitar and singing. Fascinated by the popular songwriting styles of Rodgers and Hammerstein and writers such as Irving Berlin and the energy and freshness of the Beatles, he established a deep love of pop music. Stock signed a publishing contract when he was nineteen after earning a reputation as a budding songwriter, although no one had suggested a full-time career in the music world was a possibility.

In 1970, Stock earned a placement at the University of Hull to study Drama and Theology and formed a band with a fellow student, the future film director, Anthony Minghella. Whilst at Hull, Stock met his wife Bobbie, and left university when she graduated to concentrate his efforts on his musical career. The two married in 1975 and sold their house in Bury, Lancashire to move back south. Stock played his first paid solo gig at Aveley Working Men's Club in Essex in 1976, earning twenty five pounds. By the late 1970s Stock, now living in Blackheath, South London, was performing up and down the country. Performing solo, in a duo or with bands Mirage and Nightwork, Stock gained a good reputation for his live performances, and was regularly booked for venues like the Hilton Hotel, Grosvenor House and the Dorchester in Mayfair. Throughout 1979 to 1981, Stock was performing every night of the week in various bands embracing pop, dance, old standards, rock or funk.

Stock's band had gone through several guitar players before he was alerted to Matt Aitken, a guitarist who had been spotted by another member of his band working on a cruise ship. Stock contacted Aitken to offer him a role in the band. Playing on cruise ships and in various bands of his own, Aitken was an accomplished guitarist whose style could adapt to any type of music. In 1982, Stock moved to Abbey Wood, South London where, along with Aitken, he acquired a recording desk and tape machine and formed his first record label. During the break of one of Mirage's sets on New Year's Eve 1983, Stock informed the band he would be leaving and was going into the studio to pursue his career as a songwriter and producer. Aitken agreed to join him and from January 1984 onwards the pair worked exclusively in recording studios.

== Stock Aitken Waterman ==
=== Formation and early hits: Divine, Hazell Dean, Dead or Alive (1984–1985) ===
Stock had briefly worked with Pete Waterman in 1980 when John Milton, Mark Stock and Mike wrote a song, "One Nine for a Lady Breaker", for a CB radio club. A version of the track found its way to Pete Waterman, who managed Peter Collins, then a successful producer with acts like Musical Youth and Nik Kershaw. The track was re-recorded and produced by Collins; Stock sang on the track under the alias Chris Britton. In January 1984, Stock and Aitken arranged to meet Waterman at his office in the Stiff Records building in Camden Town. Waterman was seeking a new partnership, and in February the three went into the Marquee Studio in Wardour Street, Soho, to record the song "The Upstroke" for Agents Aren't Aeroplanes, a front for their concept of a female version of Frankie Goes to Hollywood. The record was released on Proto Records – a label run by Barry Evangeli and Nick East – and distributed by RCA. "The Upstroke" achieved popularity in the gay clubs and discos where many new records were being found and subsequently promoted into the mainstream as Hi-NRG.

In 1983, Stock had been approached by Andy Paul, a Greek Cypriot, to write a song for Cyprus in the Eurovision Song Contest. "Anna Maria Lena" was voted by the Cypriot public to represent their country in the competition, and the re-recorded version would be Stock and Aitken's second collaboration with Waterman. The team were then asked to produce a song for Divine and they recorded "You Think You're a Man" at the Marquee Studio, which was released by Proto Records in July 1984, reaching number 16 on the UK singles chart. Soon after, the team recorded Hazell Dean's "Whatever I Do (Wherever I Go)". The song became Stock Aitken Waterman's first top 10 hit, reaching number 4 in the UK. In September 1984, they were approached by Dead or Alive to produce the song "You Spin Me Round (Like a Record)", which became SAW's first UK number 1 in March 1985.

=== The Hit Factory: Bananarama, Mel and Kim, Princess (1985–1986) ===
In 1985, the trio built a new studio at the Vineyard recording studio complex, the Borough, which would later be dubbed "the Hit Factory". Whilst working with the band Brilliant, Stock wrote a song for their backing singer Desiree Heslop called "Say I'm Your Number One", which became a hit in the UK under her stage name Princess. Towards the end of 1985 the group Bananarama approached SAW to record a cover of Shocking Blue's "Venus". The track became a huge hit in the UK and went to No. 1 in America in July 1986. Bananarama would continue to enjoy success with SAW with hits such as "Love in the First Degree", "I Heard a Rumour" and "I Want You Back". In 1986, Mel and Kim's first single "Showing Out (Get Fresh at the Weekend)" went to number 3 in the UK chart and their follow-up "Respectable" reached number 1.

=== Rick Astley, Ferry Aid (1987) ===
In 1987, Rick Astley recorded what would arguably be the team's biggest hit, "Never Gonna Give You Up", though initially Stock and Aitken were unsure of its appeal with Astley's strong but unorthodox voice. When it was released by RCA, "Never Gonna Give You Up" went straight to No. 1 in 17 different countries, including America and the UK, where it became the biggest selling record of 1987. Astley's fourth single, "Together Forever" also topped the Billboard Hot 100. That year SAW produced "Let It Be" in aid of the victims involved in the Zeebrugge Ferry disaster, and Stock got the chance to work with his musical inspiration Paul McCartney, whose original recordings of the Beatles' version were sent to the production team by producer George Martin. "Let It Be" went straight to No. 1 and stayed there for three weeks, knocking Stock's own composition "Respectable" by Mel and Kim off the top spot. Two years later Stock would again collaborate with McCartney on the Gerry and the Pacemakers hit "Ferry Cross the Mersey", recorded to raise funds for the victims and their families of the Hillsborough Disaster in 1989, which also went straight to No. 1.

=== Kylie Minogue, Jason Donovan, Band Aid II (1988–1989) ===
In 1987, Pete Waterman formed PWL, the in-house label of SAW. One of the first artists to feature on the label was Australian soap star Kylie Minogue. Stock was informed by Minogue's manager, Terry Blamey, that she had been in London for ten days waiting to work with SAW, though Waterman had not informed Stock. By the time Minogue entered the studio, she was due on a plane back to Australia later that day. In 40 minutes, Stock and Aitken had written the song "I Should Be So Lucky" and recorded a backing track and Minogue's vocals. "I Should Be So Lucky" was released by PWL in February 1988 and climbed to the No. 1 spot in March, where it stayed for five weeks, the joint longest running No. 1 of 1988. It also went to number 1 in 25 other territories, including Minogue's native Australia. With demand for a follow-up single, Minogue was not keen on returning to England to work with SAW again after the rushed treatment she had received. Stock flew to Australia to meet Minogue and her parents at her home to apologise and successfully convinced her to record a follow-up single, "Got to Be Certain", which reached No. 2 in the UK chart. When her debut album Kylie was released in August 1988, it sold 2.8 million copies, and Minogue spent more weeks on the singles chart than any other artist. Minogue went on to record three more studio albums with SAW, scoring 15 successive top 10 hits, including "Je Ne Sais Pas Pourquoi", "Hand on Your Heart", "Wouldn't Change a Thing", "Tears on My Pillow", "Better the Devil You Know" and "Shocked", among many others.

Soon after, Jason Donovan's first single, "Nothing Can Divide Us", became a top-five hit. Donovan's next single, "Especially for You", was recorded as a duet with Minogue, and reached number 1 in January 1989. A duet had not initially been planned by SAW until retailer Woolworths had taken huge orders for hundreds of thousands before the song had even been written. Stock wrote the song and sang the demo with a SAW backing singer, and Aitken flew to Australia to record Minogue's and Donovan's vocals in time for a Christmas release. Donovan returned to the studio to record the song "Too Many Broken Hearts", which went to number 1 in March 1989. His debut album, Ten Good Reasons, also held to the top spot for three weeks, selling 1.5 million copies. Donovan went on to have numerous hits with SAW, including the number-one hit "Sealed with a Kiss", "Every Day (I Love You More)", and the Christmas number-two record "When You Come Back to Me", kept off the top spot by the Band Aid II record "Do They Know It's Christmas?", also produced by Stock Aitken and Waterman.

=== Donna Summer, Cliff Richard and later work (1989–1993) ===
1989 became Stock Aitken and Waterman's most successful year, having helmed seven UK number ones (a feat equalled only by George Martin in 1963) and fifteen top-five hits. During 1989, Stock wrote and produced over seven albums' worth of material for artists such as Kylie Minogue, Jason Donovan, Bananarama, Donna Summer, Cliff Richard and Paul McCartney. The team supplied Donna Summer with her most successful hit single since the 1970s with "This Time I Know It's for Real", and composed Cliff Richard's No. 3 single "I Just Don't Have the Heart". SAW also gave 18-year-old singer Sonia a debut No. 1 with "You'll Never Stop Me Loving You". Stock became the first person to receive the Ivor Novello Award for Songwriter of the Year three times in a row between 1988 and 1990. In 1990, SAW picked up three "Ivors": for Songwriter of the Year, Most Performed Work (for Donna Summer's "This Time I Know It's for Real") and Best Selling A-Side (for Jason Donovan's "Too Many Broken Hearts"). They received the Brit Award for Best Producers in 1987, eight Ivor Novello Awards, many Music Week awards and more.

Despite continued success in the 1990s with the likes of Minogue's "Better the Devil You Know", "Step Back in Time" and "Shocked", and Lonnie Gordon's "Happenin' All Over Again", the SAW partnership began to dissipate. When Aitken left in 1991, Stock stayed with Waterman to write and produce Minogue's fourth album, Let's Get to It, Sybil's 1993 hits "The Love I Lost" and "When I'm Good and Ready", and Boy Krazy's "That's What Love Can Do", which entered the top 20 in the US. Later that year, Stock ended his relationship with Waterman; by the end of their partnership, Stock had written and/or produced over three hundred top 75 hits and over thirty platinum-selling albums.

== Post-SAW ==
In 1993, Stock formed Love This Records, and built a brand new multimillion-pound recording studio in London. The first record released via the label was a dance cover of the track "Total Eclipse of the Heart". It was a worldwide hit for Nicki French, reaching No. 2 in America and No. 1 in seven countries, selling over 2 million copies. In 1994, Simon Cowell asked Stock to produce a song for the kids' TV show Mighty Morphin Power Rangers; the resulting single, "Power Rangers", was a top 5 hit in the UK. Cowell had worked with Stock on previous occasions with artists such as Sinitta, for whom Stock wrote and produced various hits (including "Toy Boy") in 1987. Stock again collaborated with Cowell in 1993 on the World Wrestling Federation (WWF) album Wrestlemania, which spawned the No. 4 hit "Slam Jam".

In 1994, Stock produced several artists for Cowell, including Kym Mazelle, Jocelyn Brown and Robson and Jerome. Their cover of "Unchained Melody" produced by Stock and Aitken became the highest selling non-charity single of the decade, remaining at No. 1 for 7 weeks in 1995, selling 2.5 million copies. Stock produced a further two No. 1 singles with Robson and Jerome and two No. 1 albums.

After several years of producing hits for Love This Records and with Cowell for BMG/RCA, the structural integrity of Stock's studio became compromised by the tunnelling of the Jubilee Line extension, and the damage forced Stock to pursue legal action against London Underground. As a result, Stock was forced to pull out of a joint deal with Cowell and BMG to produce several artists (including the band Westlife) in 1996.

In 1997, Stock produced a version of "You Can Do Magic" (the biggest of three hit singles Limmie & Family Cookin' had in the UK chart in the 1970s) for an investigation on ITV programme The Cook Report into chart rigging, under the pseudonym "the Mojams". Fronted by Edwina Currie's daughter Debbie (then a trainee journalist for the production company Central Television), the single, credited to "the Mojams featuring Debbie Currie", was released by Gotham Records and peaked at number 86 in the UK singles chart. Stock got involved in the investigation after a number of his records' sales had been disqualified from the UK singles chart, with Love This Records having been seen as a company involved in chart hyping/chart rigging by the BPI (in regards to the Top 40 hit "Santa Maria" by Tatjana Šimić).

In 1998, Stock and Aitken teamed up with Steve Crosby, who had created the group Steps, to form the band Scooch. Their first single, "When My Baby", reached No. 29, and their follow-up single, "More Than I Needed to Know", was a top 5 hit in the UK in 2000, and went to No. 1 in Japan. Scooch's album Four Sure spawned two more top 20 singles. Stock also scored a top 20 with "Airhead" by girl band Girls@Play, with EastEnders' star Rita Simons, that toured with Steps.

In 2003, Stock formed the label Better the Devil Records and had a huge hit with the "Fast Food Song", reaching number 2 in the UK chart and selling 200,000 CD singles. Stock wrote and produced two further singles for the Fast Food Rockers, including the top 10 "Smile Please".

== Recent ==
In 2005, Stock briefly teamed up with Pete Waterman to write and produce a single for the Sheilas, a novelty group created by the Sheilas' Wheels car insurance brand, and again in 2010, collaborating on the UK's entry in the Eurovision Song Contest, "That Sounds Good to Me".

Most recently, Stock formed the company The Show 4 Kids. Stock created the pop musical The Go!Go!Go! Show with Steve Crosby to popular and critical acclaim, featuring new songs written and produced by Stock and Crosby. The show debuted at the Leicester Square Theatre, London in July 2010 and was performed daily at Alton Towers through the entirety of their 2011 season as their resident attraction. During the summer of 2011, The Go!Go!Go! Show began a regional tour of theatres across the UK, finishing at the Garrick Theatre, London in October.

In summer 2012, The Go!Go!Go! Show debuted a new live show at the Empire Cinema in London's Leicester Square. It marked the first time in over 50 years that the famous venue has hosted live entertainment. Later that year, The Go!Go!Go! Show was commissioned by Nickelodeon for television. It aired on the UK channel Nick Jr, starting in April 2013.

In 2013, Stock worked on a cartoon character called the Retrobot, which depicts a 1980s robot who is fed up with modern culture. That Christmas, the character released a song called "Christmas Robot", which went viral, but did not compete for the Christmas chart. The Retrobot did parody covers, a Radio 1's Live Lounge version of "Christmas Robot", and, a short time afterwards, a short-lived comedy news channel.

In 2014, Stock worked with Shayne Ward on his comeback album Closer. Stock co-wrote and produced all 14 tracks on the album. Closer was released on 12 April 2015, reaching number 17 in the UK chart, and hit number 2 on the UK Independent Albums Chart.

2015 also showed renewed work with Nicki French with the single "This Love".

In December 2015, Stock Aitken Waterman teamed up to produce a remix of Kylie Minogue's "Every Day's Like Christmas" in the style of Minogue's earlier hits with the trio. It was well-received by fans and critics. Rob Corpsey from the Official Charts Company stated "this is pretty much the Christmas song to end all Christmas songs; a massive sugar rush of classic, candy-coated late 80s pop wrapped up in a big shiny red bow. Oh, and did we mention Kylie's singing on it?" He concluded, "it's no wonder this latest offering is so good, because they've clearly got chemistry. We can't get enough of this and we reckon you'll feel the same..."

In 2016, Stock confirmed that he was working with young singer Chloe Rose on a single for NSPCC's Childline 30 year anniversary. Stock agreed to produce the single as he had also written and produced the very first Childline single "You've Got a Friend" by Big Fun and Sonia. The song "For Me" was performed first at England Captain Wayne Rooney's testimonial match at Old Trafford on 3 August, and released on 9 September in aid of the Wayne Rooney Foundation supporting NSPCC and Childline. The music video for the song premiered on Rose's VEVO channel on 15 August.

In 2017, Stock worked with the Fizz (formerly Bucks Fizz), co-writing and producing the album The F–Z of Pop, the group's first studio album in over 33 years. It was released in September 2017 and charted at number 25 in the UK chart and number 6 in the UK Independent Chart.

Stock has subsequently produced three further albums with the Fizz, including Christmas with the Fizz in 2018, Smoke & Mirrors in 2020 and Everything Under the Sun in 2022.

On 6 March 2020, Smoke & Mirrors was released and entered the overall Official Albums Chart at No. 29, the UK Sales Chart at No. 6, the UK Vinyl Chart at No. 5 and the Independent Chart at No. 3. The album also scored the No. 6 position on the Scottish Albums Chart. Commenting on the album, Classic Pop magazine stated that "The Fizz are back firing on all cylinders with Smoke & Mirrors – an album of shiny new pop bangers, the latest fruit of a fertile collaboration with legendary hitmaker Mike Stock". Commenting on the songs, it stated that "All We Ever Can Do" and "Boomerang" illustrate the group's "extraordinary resilience", while "The World We Left Behind" sees them "laying to rest a few old ghosts".

== See also ==
- Ivor Novello Awards
- List of songs written or produced by Stock Aitken Waterman
