= Agogo =

Agogo may refer to

- Agogo, Ghana
- Agogô, a musical instrument
- Agogo (album), by KMFDM
- AGOGO Media, a Hong Kong-based animation studio and production company founded in 1990.

== See also ==
- Junior Agogo (1979–2019), Ghanaian footballer
- À gogo (disambiguation), multiple term deriving from a French expression meaning "in abundance, galore"
