= À gogo =

À gogo or -a-go-go may refer to:

- A Go Go (John Scofield album), a 1998 album by John Scofield
- A Go Go (Potshot album), a 2002 album by Potshot
- Agogo (album), a 1998 album by KMFDM

== See also ==
- Agogo (disambiguation)
- Au Go Go Records, Melbourne, Australia based independent record label
- Go go (disambiguation)
- Agogô, a musical instrument
