= 2016 United Kingdom elections =

United Kingdom elections, 2016 refers to several elections that took place in the United Kingdom on Thursday 5 May 2016, at subnational and local level. Elections on that day are:

- Local elections in England
- Scottish Parliament election
- Welsh Assembly election
- Northern Ireland Assembly election
- London Assembly election
- Bristol mayoral election
- London mayoral election
- Liverpool mayoral election
- Salford mayoral election
- Police and crime commissioner elections in England and Wales
- Ogmore by-election
- Sheffield Brightside and Hillsborough by-election

== See also ==
- National referendum on the United Kingdom's membership of the European Union, held on 23 June 2016
