= Go!Go!Go! =

British musical group

- Origin: United Kingdom
- Genres: Pop music, dance-pop, children's television, children's music
- Years active: 2010–2020
- Members: Holly Atterton; Gemma Naylor; Carl Tracey; Jade Natalie Meaney (2011-2020); Steve Leeds
- Past members: Kirsten Joy Gill
- Website: http://gogogo.tv

Go!Go!Go! is a British children's musical group. It is part of a cross-media project aimed at primary-age children comprising the pop group, live theatre show (The Go!Go!Go! Show), television, and interactive website.

== The Go!Go!Go! Show ==
Go!Go!Go! features in the family pop musical The Go!Go!Go! Show, produced by the Show 4 Kids PLC, a company set up by Mike Stock (formerly of Stock Aitken Waterman) and Steve Crosby (creator of the pop group Steps). The live show features songs composed by Stock and Crosby, dance routines choreographed by Paul Domaine, and an interactive storyline.

== Productions ==
The Go!Go!Go! Show made its theatre debut during summer 2010 at the Leicester Square Theatre in London and continued through the year, finishing its run with a specially adapted show over the Christmas period.

In 2011, The Go!Go!Go! Show began a residency Alton Towers Resort, in the Cloud Cuckoo Land Theatre. Up to five shows a day (requiring two casts) were performed at Alton Towers as their resident live attraction throughout the year.

In summer 2011 the show undertook a regional tour of the UK, including places such as Dartford, Cornwall and Wolverhampton. The tour ended in London's West End at the Garrick Theatre in October 2011 where it performed several sell-out shows.

In 2012, The Go!Go!Go! Show unveiled a new show at the Empire Cinema in Leicester Square. It marked the first time in over 50 years that the venue had hosted a live performance. Later in 2012 the show was commissioned for television by Nickelodeon. Filming took place in early 2013 and began broadcast on UK satellite channel Nick Jr. in April. Go!Go!Go! appeared daily on the Nick Jr. UK channel; the music videos aired between the channel's regular schedule of programmes. It ended in 2015, due to the planned Go!Go!Go! Electro shows in London starting in 2016 onwards. During this, two members Gemma & Steve departed from the band to focus on their own projects.
