= Gogo fish =

The term Gogo fish may refer to the following fossil fish found in the Gogo Formation in Western Australia:

- Gogonasus
- Mcnamaraspis kaprios
