= Goo Kim Fui =

Chinese merchant, community leader, and philanthropist

Goo Kim Fui 古今輝
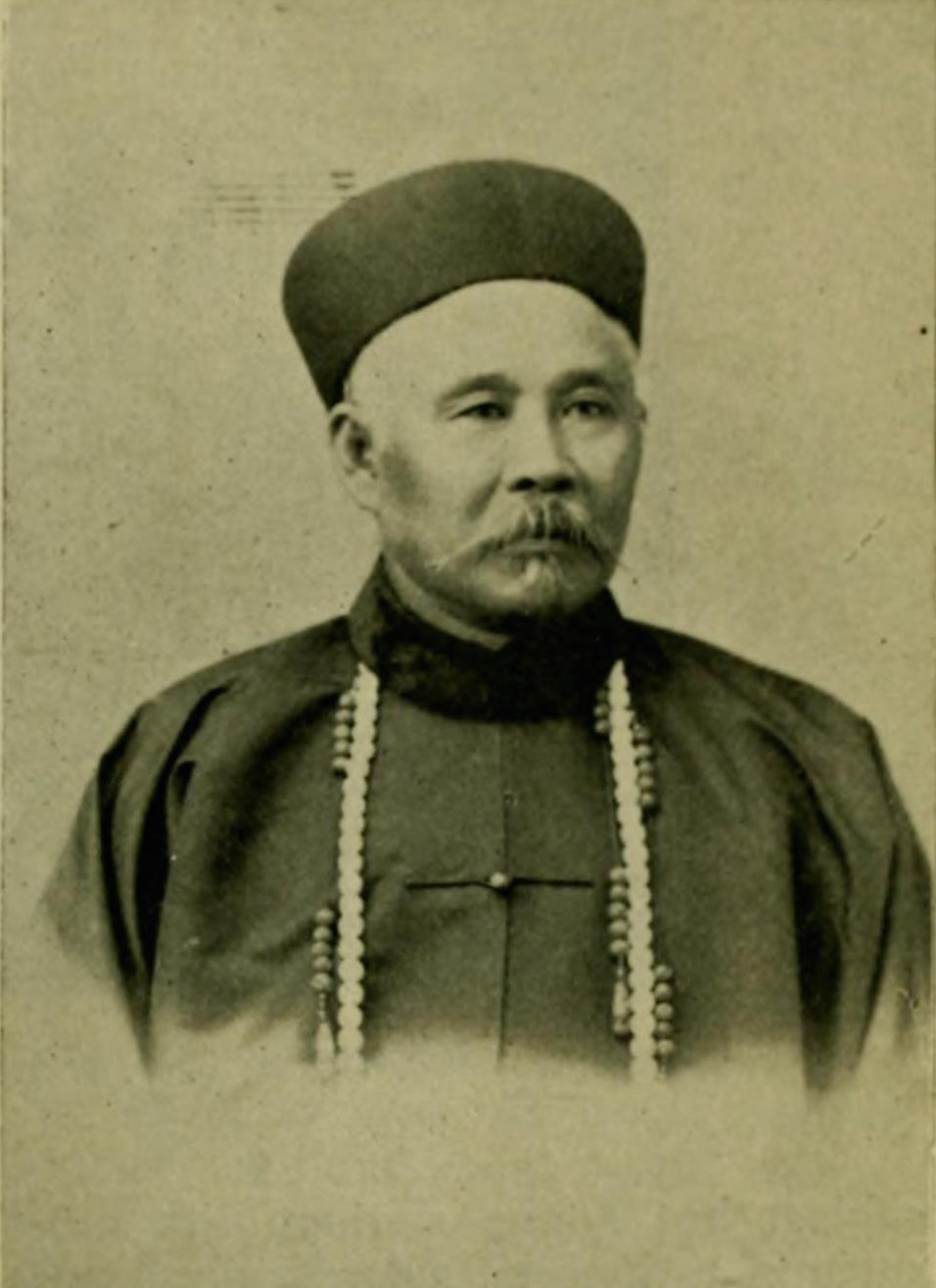

President of the United Chinese Society Honolulu, Hawaii

Personal details
- Born: 1835 Meixian, China
- Died: 3 May 1908 Honolulu, Hawaii Territory, United States
- Spouse: Ellen Kamae
- Occupation: Merchant

Goo Kim Fui (Chinese: 古今輝; pinyin: Gǔ Jīnhuī, 1835–1908) was an influential Chinese merchant, community leader, and philanthropist. He was a defender of the Chinese people during the exclusion act in Honolulu in the 1880s and played an instrumental role in uniting the local Chinese people. Goo's efforts to protect their rights from prejudices against Chinese immigrants meant that many Chinese were able to prosper in their work and living.

Goo Kim Fui met the young Sun Yat-sen when Sun was studying in Hawaii. They both shared the same Christian faith and were friends with the same pastor, Sit Moon. As Chinese Vice-Consul to Hawaii, Goo was able to help Sun obtain travel visas to Honolulu. Later, Goo and other members of his church financially supported Sun's revolution toward a modern China and shared similar ideals.

As the social work of Goo Kim Fui occupied so much of his focus, appears that these innovative programs and social engineering innovations influenced the thinking of the young Sun Yat-sen.

== Early life ==
Goo Kim Fui was born in 1835 in Mei Xian, China, to a Hakka family. In his early 20s, he went to Southeast Asia to pursue new business opportunities, but in 1866, he decided to go to Hawaii to establish himself there and expand his businesses. Goo knew the English language well and was very successful in networking with the local tradesmen. In a few years, he became one of the wealthiest and prosperous merchants in Honolulu.

== Religious beliefs ==
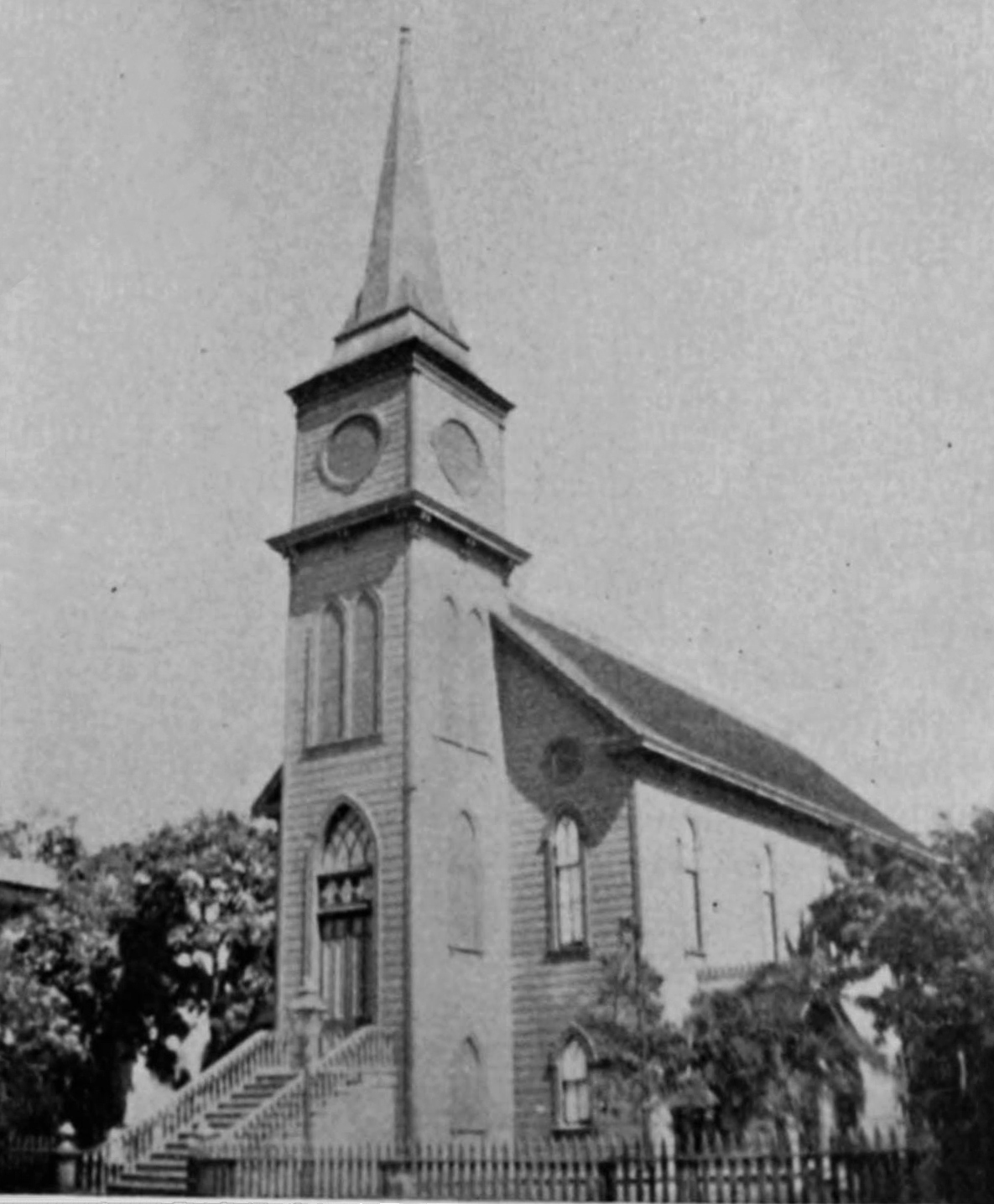
Chinese Christian Church, Honolulu, HI

In 1875, through Sit Moon, a Chinese pastor from San Francisco, Goo converted to Christianity. At the time, they attended the church service of Rev. Samuel C. Damon's Seamen's Bethel Church. In 1877, they established the Chinese Y.M.C.A. which would later become known as the Chinese Christian Association (CCA). It was chartered by King Kalakaua on November 13, 1877 and many Chinese attended the fellowship meetings. The congregation gradually grew in number and funds were raised to construct a new church building to accommodate the people. In 1879, the Chinese Christian Church, which would later become the First Chinese Church of Christ in Hawaii, opened its doors.

== Public service ==
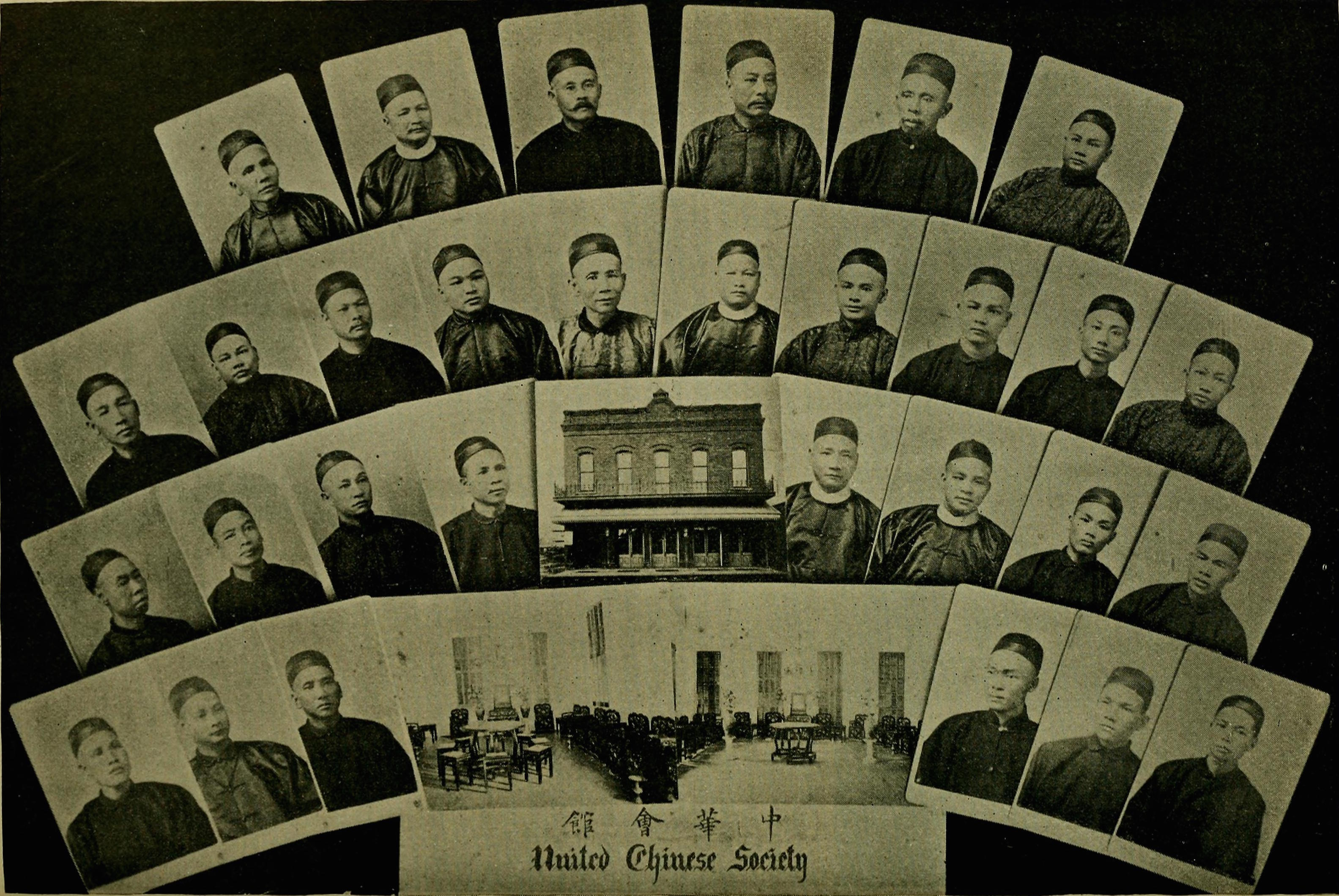
Goo Kim Fui (back row, third from left) was president of the United Chinese Society (中華會館)

In 1882, Goo Kim Fui was elected as vice-president of the United Chinese Society (中華會館) to promote mutual aid among Chinese migrants in Hawaii. Goo served as a commercial agent with the official title of Chinese Vice-Consul to Hawaii.

Goo later succeeded his predecessor as the president of the United Chinese Society in July, 1892. Like anti-Semitic feelings, the exclusion act in the 1880s and increasing discriminatory activities of foreigners led Goo to organize the Mutual Defense Association ("Lein Wei Hui") in 1894 and in response to help his own countrymen when they were refused medical help at the general hospital, he set up a Chinese hospital in March 1897 (惠華醫院) to cater to Chinese patients. With the help of his long-time Christian friend, Sanford B. Dole, President of the Republic of Hawaii, Goo won the legal battle to protect the rights of the Chinese migrants living and working in Hawaii as well as the right to legally attain American citizenship.

Following a disastrous fire on January 20, 1900, that burned down nearly all of Chinatown, Goo Kim Fui actively participated in efforts to save Chinatown and eliminate the large losses suffered by local Chinese businesses. He donated his own money to help the victims of the fire. He was greatly respected and honored with an award for his contribution.

In July 1902 Goo Kim Fui was promoted from Vice Consul to Acting Consul General of the Chinese Legation in Honolulu following a US Department of State protest. Yang Wei-pin, the previous Chinese Consul in Hawaii resigned "for domestic reasons" and was immediately replaced by Goo Kim Fui.

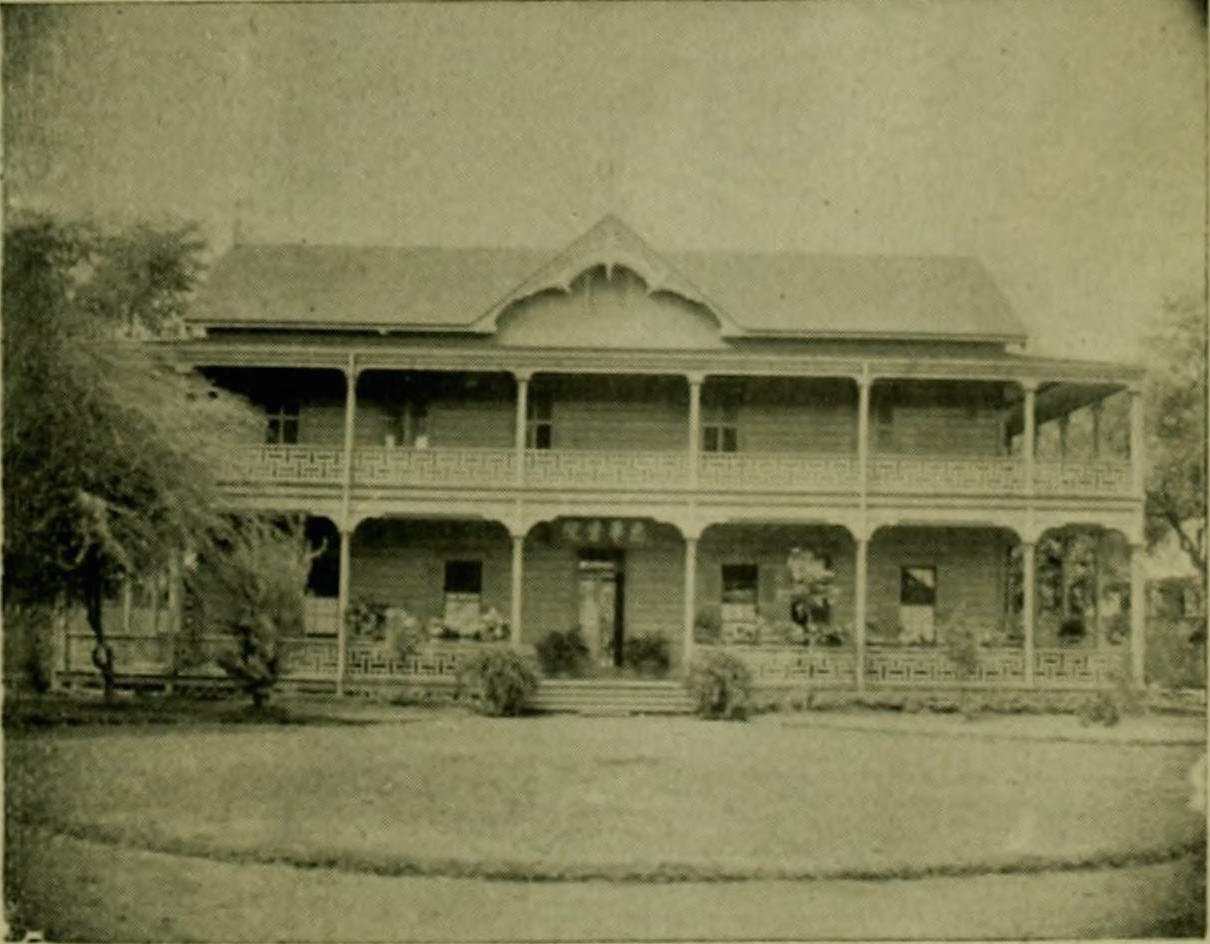
Chinese Hospital (惠華醫院), Honolulu, HI, 1897

During his years serving in the United Chinese Society, Goo co-founded several community centers for the benefit of the people, including the Protection Bureau ("Bow On Guk"), the Mutual Defense Association ("Lein Wei Hui"), the Chinese Christian Association, the Chinese Christian Church on Fort Street, an educational institution and a hospital. He often traveled back to his hometown in China and built houses for his extended family as well as building a church for his community.

Following the annexation of Hawaii the Overland Monthly published an article on the Chinese Community in Honolulu:

"Foremost in the Chinese colony is Goo Kim Fui, Chinese Consular Agent to Hawaii, President of the United Chinese Society, President of the Hospital Association, President to the Young Men's Christian Association, a merchant of tried probity, great business sagacity, great wealth, and the proprietor of extensive enterprises. He would be a man of influence anywhere. Self-made to a large extent, he combines the breadth of view, the solidity of character, and the intellectual amplitude, that mark the man of achievement."

== Remembrance ==
Upon his death in 1908, Goo Kim Fui was eulogized in the Annual Report of the Hawaiian Evangelical Association.

"Mr. Goo Kim Fui, our honored co-laborer in the Chinese Mission work and one of the most prominent Chinese residing in Hawaii, passed away on May 3rd of this year, being more than seventy years of age. Mr. Goo Kim came to Hawaii in 1867 and early engaged in business enterprises. He was married to Miss Ellen Kamae, a Hawaiian lady, in 1872.

Both Mr. and Mrs. Goo Kim were members of the old Bethel Church under the pastorate of Rev. Dr. Damon. Mr. Goo Kim after his conversion became the foremost leader in our Chinese colony in all departments of Christian and philanthropic work. We commend to all the lessons of his long and victorious life. ... As an honored representative of the Chinese Imperial Government for many years, as an active and busy merchant, a faithful and devoted church deacon, chief mover in Y.M.C.A. work, teacher in the Sunday School and Bible instructor, evangelist and teacher under the Hawaiian Board, he will long be remembered. In his noble wife, and family he found sympathetic helpers and co-workers. As a chief and leader he was borne to his burial by hundreds of his countrymen and representatives of other nationalities."
