= Gogos (surname) =

Gogos is a surname. Notable people with this surname include:

- Angelica Gogos (born 1989), Australian rules footballer
- Basil Gogos (1929–2017), American illustrator
- Dimitri Gogos (1931–2019), Greek-Australian]journalist and editor
- Dimitris Gogos (1903–1985), Greek singer and composer
- Georgios Gogos (born 2001), Greek football centre-back
- Jordan Gogos, Australian fashion designer
