= Making Your Mind Up =

1981 single by Bucks Fizz

Single by Bucks Fizz

from the album Bucks Fizz
- B-side: "Don't Stop"
- Released: March 1981
- Genre: Rock and roll
- Length: 2.39
- Label: RCA
- Composer: John Danter
- Lyricist: Andy Hill
- Producer: Andy Hill

Bucks Fizz singles chronology
"Making Your Mind Up" (1981)	"Piece of the Action" (1981)

Music video
- "Making Your Mind Up" on YouTube

Eurovision Song Contest 1981 entry
- Country: United Kingdom
- Artists: Bobby G; Mike Nolan; Jay Aston; Cheryl Baker
- As: Bucks Fizz
- Language: English
- Composer: John Danter
- Lyricist: Andy Hill
- Conductor: John Coleman

Finals performance
- Final result: 1st
- Final points: 136

Entry chronology
- ◄ "Love Enough for Two" (1980)
- "One Step Further" (1982) ►

Official performance video
- "Making Your Mind Up" on YouTube

"Making Your Mind Up" is a song by the British pop group Bucks Fizz with music composed by John Danter and lyrics written by Andy Hill. Released in March 1981, it was Bucks Fizz's debut single, the group having been formed just two months earlier. It represented the United Kingdom in the Eurovision Song Contest 1981, held in Dublin, winning the contest.

Following its win in the contest, the song reached No. 1 in the UK and several other countries, eventually selling in excess of four million copies. It launched the career of the group, who went on to become one of the biggest selling acts of the 1980s and featured on their debut, self-titled album. From 2004 to 2007 the BBC used the name Making Your Mind Up for their Eurovision selection show in honour of the song.

== Background ==
=== Origins ===
In late 1980, songwriter Andy Hill composed "Making Your Mind Up" with an eye to entering it into the A Song for Europe finals the following year. Working with his then-girlfriend Nichola Martin, a singer and music publisher, she encouraged him to collaborate with musician John Danter, who she could sign up to her publishing company, therefore owning half the rights of the song (Hill was already signed to another publisher). Martin claims that Danter's input was minimal, the song being essentially a Hill composition. In October 1980, they set about recording a demo of the song featuring the vocals of Hill, Martin and Mike Nolan, a singer Martin had worked with before. In December, the song was chosen out of 591 submitted entries to be one of the eight songs performed in the contest. Martin then realised she had to quickly assemble a group to perform the song for the contest, based around her and Nolan. With the song already entered under the name Bucks Fizz, Martin and future group manager, Jill Shirley recruited Cheryl Baker, Bobby G and Jay Aston to the line-up, with Martin herself dropping out. The song was alongside another Hill/Danter composition, "Have You Ever Been in Love", which would be performed by Martin and Hill under the name Gem.

Martin and Shirley secured a recording deal with RCA Records and Hill spent a week at Mayfair Studios in London with the group recording the song and its B-side. Backing vocals on the record were supplied by Alan Carvell, who also went on to be one of two backing singers in the Eurovision performance. The song was co-published by Paper Music, which was a year-old publishing company owned by Billy Lawrie – himself a songwriter and brother of singer Lulu. Choreographer Chrissie Whickham, a former member of dance troupe Hot Gossip, spent two days with the group working on the dance routine.

The lyrics of the song are largely meaningless, although it can be argued that they are about making the decision to commit to a serious relationship.

=== Eurovision ===
On 11 March 1981, Bucks Fizz performed "Making Your Mind Up" at A Song for Europe 1981, the national final organised by the British Broadcasting Corporation (BBC) to select its song and performer for the 26th edition of the Eurovision Song Contest. Despite being up against favourites and current chart group Liquid Gold, it won the competition with ease, becoming the British entrant for Eurovision.

From this point, the group undertook much promotion of the song around the UK, including an appearance on Top of the Pops, whereby the single entered the UK charts at 24. It rose to No.5 the following week. As Martin recalls, RCA records were rather indifferent to the group up until now (even releasing the single without a picture sleeve in the UK), but once it entered the charts highly, their attitudes changed suddenly with them agreeing to release an album before they had even won the Eurovision. The BBC filmed a promotional video for the Eurovision previews as they had done in previous years. The video depicts the group walking around Harrods department store in London. In line with other previous preview videos, the group do not lipsynch any of the words. This video has never been released on any official Bucks Fizz video or DVD release, being usually substituted by the group's first appearance on Top of the Pops.

On 4 April 1981, the Eurovision Song Contest was held at the RDS Simmonscourt in Dublin hosted by Radio Telefís Éireann (RTÉ) and broadcast live throughout the continent. Bucks Fizz performed "Making Your Mind Up" fourteenth on the evening. John Coleman conducted the event's live orchestra in its performance. In a close contest throughout the voting procedure with no less than five different songs taking the lead at various stages, "Making Your Mind Up" managed to secure a victory with 136 points, beating second-placed Germany by a small margin of four.

The song is held in affectionate regard by many Eurovision fans, and is generally considered to be a classic example of a pop song from the Contest. Reaction was less favourable to the group's performance of the song, which was considered to be off-key, and led to much criticism that the members were chosen more for their appearance than vocal ability. In addition, the performance is best remembered for the startling moment when the two male members of the group whipped off the skirts of the two girls (on the line "if you wanna see some more"), only to reveal shorter skirts underneath, a shrewd touch generally considered to have just swung the balance in their favour, and to be a defining moment in the competition's history. Member Cheryl Baker has since commented on their poor performance, stating that she sang the song in a higher key to the rest of the group due to nerves. Mike Nolan has said that on the night the microphones got mixed up, with Baker and Jay Aston singing on the lead microphones, which had a higher volume.

=== Aftermath ===
"Making Your Mind Up" went to No. 1 in the UK following the victory and remained there for three weeks, becoming one of the best-selling songs of the year. It also saw the group in high demand throughout Europe, with the single hitting No. 1 in many countries and charting in the top ten in Australia. The record eventually sold four million copies worldwide. The single began a run of 20 UK hits for Bucks Fizz and was quickly followed up by the single "Piece of the Action" and the debut album Bucks Fizz. At the end of the decade, "Making Your Mind Up" was No. 47 in the UK top-selling singles of the 1980s. Despite the success of the song, fans of the group do not consider it to be a good representation of their work, while member Cheryl Baker does not rate it as one of their best songs. The song is still well-liked by members of the general public and remains the group's best-remembered song. In 2013, BBC Radio 2 listeners voted "Making Your Mind Up" as the best British Eurovision entry ever.

Bucks Fizz performed their song in the Eurovision twenty-fifth anniversary show Songs of Europe held on 22 August 1981 in Mysen. It was succeeded as the British entrant in Eurovision by "One Step Further" by Bardo, who were managed by the same team as Bucks Fizz. As a winner, it was succeeded by "Ein bißchen Frieden", sung by Germany's Nicole. The song title has also given the name to the UK selection process for the Eurovision Song Contest.

The now famous skirt rip of the dance routine (which was mirrored by Mick Jagger and Tina Turner at 1985's Live Aid) has appeared in many contests since that time – most notably as part of Latvia's Marie N's performance of "I Wanna", which won for Latvia, in 2002.

=== In popular culture ===
The song was featured in the British soap opera EastEnders in May 2023 during that year's edition of the Eurovision Song Contest which was being hosted in the United Kingdom on behalf of Ukraine. Cheryl Baker guest starred in the episode, which saw her help some of the characters who performed the song on stage at a Eurovision-themed party.

The recorded version of the song was featured in the third episode of the TV series Ashes to Ashes, broadcast in February 2008. It was also featured in the Doctor Who episode "The Interstellar Song Contest" in May 2025.

== Track listing ==
1. "Making Your Mind Up" (Andy Hill / John Danter) (2.39)
2. "Don't Stop" (Andy Hill / Nichola Martin) (4.08)

== Chart positions ==
=== Weekly charts ===
Chart (1981)	Peak position
Australia (Kent Music Report)	6
Austria (Ö3 Austria Top 40)	1
Belgium (Ultratop 50 Flanders)	1
Denmark (Hitlisten)	1
Finland (Suomen virallinen lista)	5
Germany (GfK)	5
Iceland (Vísir)	3
Ireland (IRMA)	1
Israel (IBA)	1
Netherlands (Dutch Top 40)	1
Netherlands (Single Top 100)	1
New Zealand (Recorded Music NZ)	3
Norway (VG-lista)	2
Spain (AFYVE)	5
South Africa (Springbok Radio)	7
Sweden (Sverigetopplistan)	2
Switzerland (Schweizer Hitparade)	3
UK Singles (Official Charts)	1

=== Year-end charts ===
Chart (1981)	Position
Australia (Kent Music Report)	35
Austria (Ö3 Austria)	10
Belgium (Ultratop Flanders)	6
Denmark (Hitlisten)	6
Germany (GfK Entertainment)	41
Netherlands (Dutch Top 40)	9
Netherlands (Single Top 100)	10
New Zealand (Recorded Music NZ)	33
Switzerland (Schweizer Hitparade)	16
UK Singles	7

In the UK, "Making Your Mind Up" was certified Gold by the British Phonographic Industry (BPI).

== Legacy ==
"Making Your Mind Up" was spoofed by many artists following its success, with alternative titles: "Me vas a volver loco (You're Going to Drive Me Crazy)" by Spanish group Parchís, "Rock and Roll Cowboy" by German singer Maggie Mae, and "It's Only a Wind Up" by British comedy group Brown Ale.

Preceded by "What's Another Year" by Johnny Logan	Eurovision Song Contest winners 1981	Succeeded by "Ein bißchen Frieden" by Nicole
