= Cheryl Baker =

British singer (born 1954)

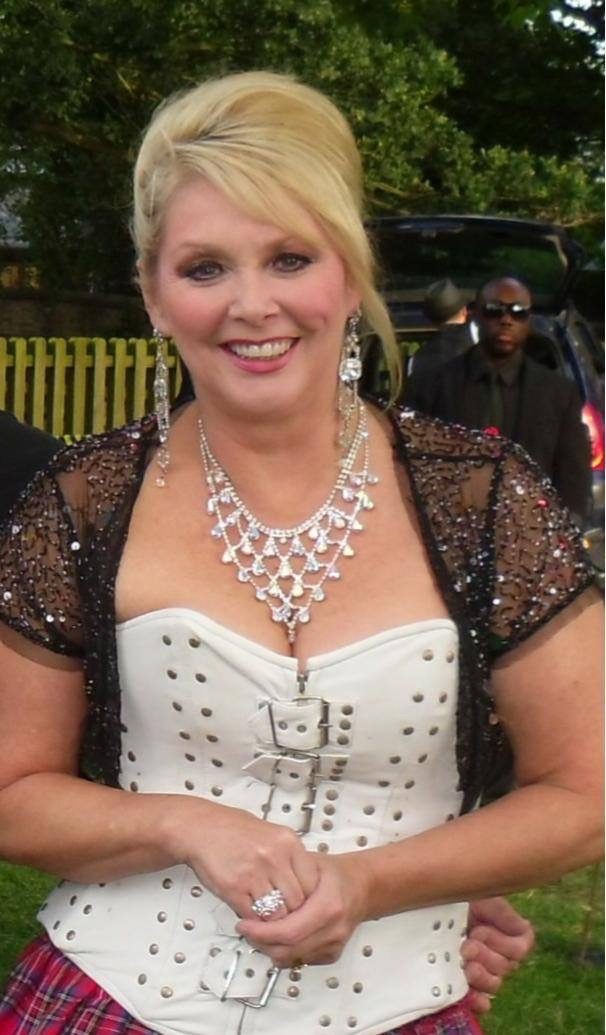
- Baker in 2013

Background information
- Born: Rita Maria Crudgington; 8 March 1954 (age 72); Bethnal Green, London, England
- Occupations: Singer; television presenter
- Years active: 1975–present

Rita Maria Stroud (née Crudgington; born 8 March 1954), known professionally as Cheryl Baker, is an English singer and television presenter. She was a member of pop group Bucks Fizz, which won the 1981 Eurovision Song Contest and, following legal disputes, now performs under the name the Fizz. Bucks Fizz had 20 singles reach the UK top 60 between 1981 and 1988, including three number one hits with "Making Your Mind Up" (1981), "The Land of Make Believe" (1981) and "My Camera Never Lies" (1982).

Baker, who as a member of Co-Co had earlier represented the UK at the 1978 Eurovision Song Contest, left Bucks Fizz in 1993 to concentrate on her television career. In the mid-1980s, while still with the group, Baker started a career as a television presenter, including for the children's show How Dare You! (1984) and The Saturday Picture Show (1985–1986). In 1987, she joined Record Breakers and remained as a co-host until 1997. Her own show Eggs 'n' Baker, featuring cooking and guest musical performers, ran for five years from 1988. Her other appearances include Popstar to Operastar (2011), Celebrity Mastermind (2013 and 2022) and in the tenth series of Dancing on Ice (2017).

In 2004, Baker, Shelley Preston and fellow original Bucks Fizz member Mike Nolan started performing together as the Original Bucks Fizz. Another original Bucks Fizz member, Jay Aston, replaced Preston 2009. The group went through rebrandings, and in 2017, they renamed themselves as the Fizz and worked on new material. Baker has also appeared in several pantomimes, and in a musical theatre production of Footloose.

== Early career ==
Cheryl Baker was born as Rita Maria Crudgington on 8 March 1954 in Bethnal Green, London. She had a sister and three brothers. Her father Ted worked as a cobbler, and her mother was called Doll. After leaving school she worked in a stockbroker's office, and attended an evening amateur operatic group. She joined a band called Bressingham Spire when she was 17, but they soon disbanded and she joined another group, which included Mike Read. After this she became part of Mother's Pride, later renamed as Co-Co, after seeing an advert for new members for the group in Melody Maker. The group entered A Song for Europe in 1976 with the song "Wake Up". They came second, being beaten by (eventual Eurovision winners) Brotherhood of Man by two points.

The group continued to perform together and in 1978, they entered A Song for Europe again with "The Bad Old Days". This time they won and went on to perform for the UK in Paris. The song managed 11th place – the lowest placing by a UK entry up to that point. John Kennedy O'Connor, author of The Eurovision Song Contest – The Official History, described the group giving "a very weak and off-key vocal performance". Baker later reflected that she had been "totally disillusioned, that I'd let the country down. I can't honestly say I enjoyed anything about my first Eurovision experience even though it had been a childhood ambition." The song became a hit single, reaching 13 in the UK Singles Chart.

== Bucks Fizz ==
Baker in 1983

In late 1980, Baker was contacted by Nichola Martin, a producer, music publisher and singer who was setting up a new group to record "Making Your Mind Up" which was one of the eight songs shortlisted for A Song For Europe, the winner of which would become the UK entry for the 1981 Eurovision Song Contest. The shortlisting was done on the basis of a recording submitted on cassette tapes, which was performed by Martin, songwriter Andy Hill, and Mike Nolan, but Martin decided to put together a group with two men and two women, not including herself or Hill. The group, called Bucks Fizz and consisting of Nolan, Baker, Bobby Gee and Jay Aston, won A Song For Europe, which meant they became the UK representative at the Eurovision Song Contest on 4 April 1981. The song went on to win by a margin of four points ahead of the second-placed German entry. O'Connor wrote that "the group sang way off-key, but had such enthusiasm that the judges overlooked this in favour of the song". As part of the choreography, the male members of the group tore skirts off the women at the last chorus, revealing shorter skirts below. Author Nick Brownlee reflected that "It may sound unkind to suggest that it was this gimmick, rather than the song itself, that captured the imagination of the voters, but such was the relentless sameness of Eurovision songs that it would take something unusual to stir the dozing denizens of Brussels, Frankfurt, Luxembourg and Basle." In Nul Points (2007), his book about Eurovision, Tim Moore wrote that Baker's "detachable skirt [would] help Bucks Fizz to the Euro crown". Baker later recalled that as the group was on stage being photographed after winning, she thought "That piece of Velcro on the skirts has just changed my life." She has also commented that "It was the iconic moment that won us the competition; I really believe that."

Baker was one of the few artists to take part in Eurovision to win at their second attempt. "Making Your Mind Up" became a number one hit in the UK, Austria, Belgium, Denmark, Germany, Ireland, Israel, the Netherlands, Norway, Spain, and Norway. She has said that she does not like the song, as it is "not her kind of music at all".

Baker and the rest of the group had two more British number ones; "The Land of Make Believe" (1981) and "My Camera Never Lies" (1982). They had further successful singles, but after When We Were Young (1983), their next records sold less well. Baker and Aston appeared in cameo roles in the video for "Who's That Girl?" (1983) by Eurythmics.

According to journalist and author Simon Garfield, "petty jealousies over who sang lead vocals and designed outfits and routines" frequently occurred, and Baker would often clash with both Gee and Martin. He refers to the group as "not, after all, a band formed on trust and personal admiration half as much as it was a band formed by the goals of money and success" and therefore prone to infighting and jealousies. In all, Bucks Fizz had 20 singles reach the UK top 60 between 1981 and 1988.

On 11 December 1984, Baker was involved in a serious crash in Newcastle upon Tyne, while on tour with the group, when the tour bus crashed into a lorry. She was injured and rushed to hospital. Although she sustained three broken vertebrae in her spine, she made a speedy recovery. Colleague Mike Nolan, however, suffered serious head injuries, prompting Baker to help establish the HeadFirst charity which supports crash victims, specifically those with head injuries. The group's popularity had been diminishing before the crash. The group then went through a series of personnel changes after an initial breakup in 1985, with ownership of the name Bucks Fizz being contested.

Baker left the group in 1993 to focus on developing her career in television. In an interview with Boyz in 2015, Baker said that, "When I left the group in the 90s, we were doing bingo halls and places like that and it was soul destroying because no one cared." Baker recalled interviewing participants in a Here and Now Tour when she was working for a magazine, and being inspired to reform the group. Around Christmas 2004, some of the band members, including Baker, reunited for live performances.

== Television ==
While still with Bucks Fizz, Baker started a career as a television presenter in the mid-1980s. Baker and Carrie Grant were the two successful candidates from nearly 400 applicants to host the children's show How Dare You! in 1984, and each hosted alternate episodes of the series. In 1985, Baker was one of several celebrities that each hosted Children's ITV for a month.

In 1985 and 1986, she co-hosted The Saturday Picture Show with Mark Curry In 1987, she joined Record Breakers as a co-host with Roy Castle, and continued as a presenter with new hosts after Castle's death in 1994. Baker eventually left the show in 1997, after 10 years. She also presented The Saturday Six O'Clock Show with Michael Aspel, and had guest appearances on the game shows Blankety Blank and Surprise, Surprise.

In 1988, Baker presented her own TV show Eggs 'n' Baker, featuring cooking and guest musical performers, which ran for five years. In 1989, a seven-part series, My Secret Desire, in which a panel attempted to identify the secret ambitions of guests, was hosted by Baker. She presented series of six short programmes about food safety, The Survival Guide to Food, in 1992.

After leaving Bucks Fizz, Baker took on other television work alongside Record Breakers. In 1987, The Stage described her as "ubiquitous ... all over the small screen at the moment". She also participated in reality television shows including I'm Famous and Frightened! (2004). She broke her ankle during a landing on Drop the Celebrity (2003). Baker released the solo singles: "If Paradise Is Half as Nice" (1987) and "Sensuality" (1992), although neither of these found chart success.

In June 2011, she reached the final of the ITV series Popstar to Operastar, where she was beaten into second place by Joe McElderry. Baker appeared on Celebrity Mastermind in 2013 and 2022. In the latter appearance, she chose classic Disney Films as her specialist subject. Baker was confirmed as the second celebrity to take part in the tenth series of Dancing on Ice in October 2017. She was the fourth contestant to be eliminated.

Baker appeared in a special episode of the BBC One soap opera EastEnders to celebrate the Eurovision Song Contest 2023; the episode was broadcast on 11 May 2023, the night before the Eurovision semi-final.

== Other work and later iterations of Bucks Fizz ==
She made her acting debut in the title role in a television production of Cinderella on ITV at Christmas 1986. At the time, she stated that her other professional commitments would be fitted around her Bucks Fizz timetable.

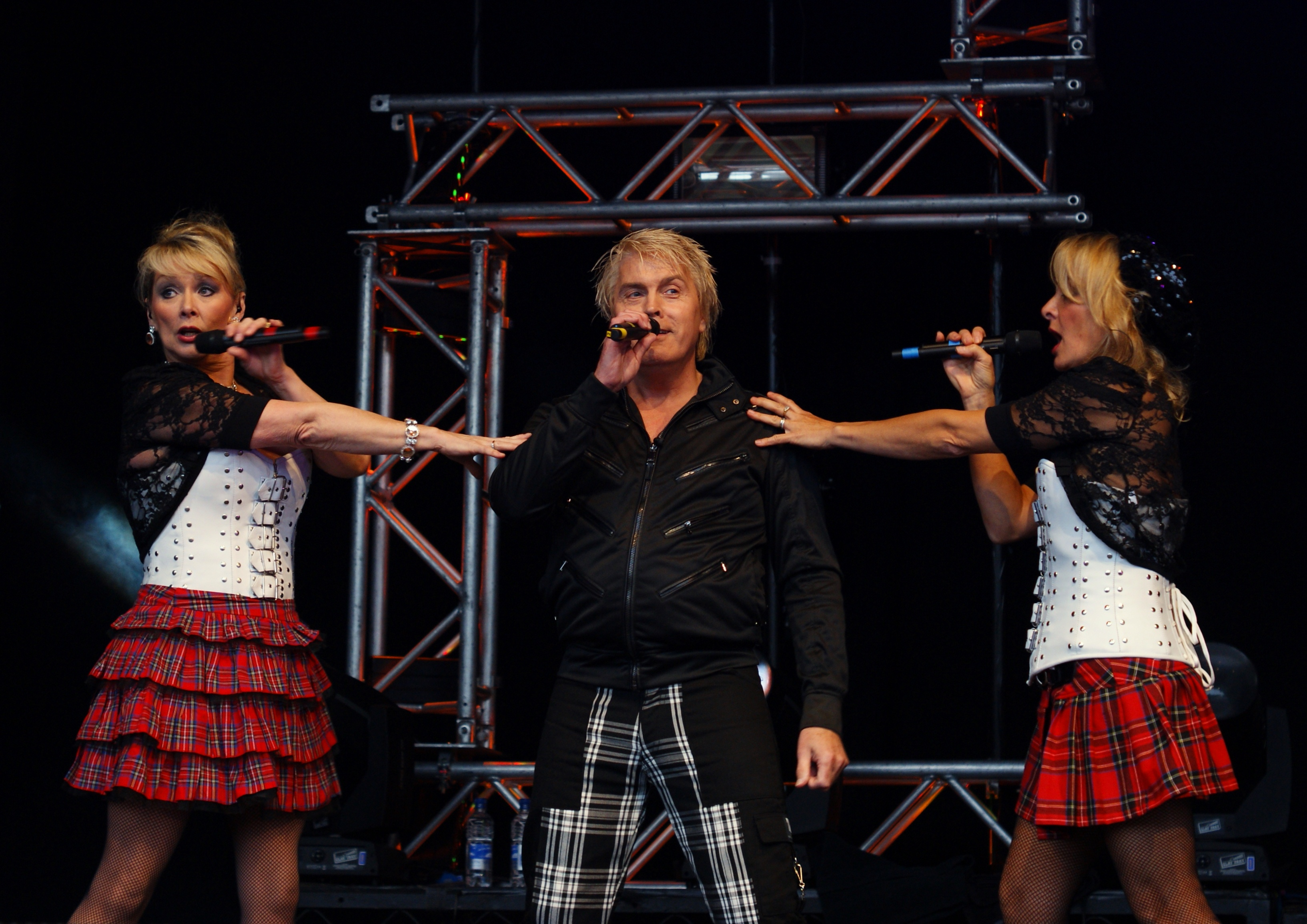
Baker (left) performing with The Original Bucks Fizz in 2011

Her stage acting debut was in Babes in the Wood, the 1987 pantomime at the London Palladium, alongside Cannon and Ball, Marti Webb and John Inman. Baker played Maid Marian, and Peter Hepple of The Stage called her "a new and highly promising recruit to the pantomime ranks". Among later pantomime appearances at various venues, she took the title roles of Aladdin in 1989, Dick Whittington in 1993, and Cinderella in 1990, 1991 and 1995. The Stage critic Pat Rusch praised Baker's 1991 turn as Cinderella, writing that she "looked good, played the part with gusto" and sang well, but lamented that the lack of musical numbers in the show meant that she was not able to stand out as much as she could have done otherwise.

Baker's Cheryl Baker's Low Calorie Cook Book (1996) reached number four in the UK book charts.

Baker, Nolan and Preston reunited as a group under the name the Original Bucks Fizz in 2004. Preston left the band in 2009 and was replaced by original member Aston. Following their loss in legal disputes with Gee over the rights to the name in 2011, they renamed the group. In 2012, they were known as OBF, and later as Cheryl, Mike and Jay – Formerly of Bucks Fizz. They later changed their name to the Fizz, and released the albums The F–Z of Pop (2017) and Smoke & Mirrors (2020) which both charted in the top 30.

In 2006, Baker took her first musical theatre role, as Vi Moore in Footloose, based on the 1984 motion picture of the same name, on tour and at the Novello Theatre. The same year, she fronted a series of television commercials for Safestyle windows; the company felt that she represented an "instantly recognised image of the 'girl next door'". During 2009, Baker toured with the musical Menopause.

== Personal life ==
Baker married Steve Stroud, the bass player in Cliff Richard's band, on 25 January 1992. They have twin daughters, born in June 1994 after In vitro fertilisation treatment. She is the vice-president of the stillbirth charity Abigail's Footsteps, became an Ambassador of Festival4Stars talent competition after she judged a national final in 2008.

On Record Breakers Baker set a world record for the longest rope slide, descending from Blackpool Tower, and was part of the world's largest Jazz ensemble and the longest Riverdance line. In 1987, Baker and Gyles Brandreth kissed onscreen for three minutes and 33 seconds, longer than the then-record longest onscreen kiss.
