= Here and Now Tour (various artists) =

Series of concert tours

The Here and Now Tour is a series of 1980s nostalgia concert tours, which began in 2001, featuring groups and singers famous in the 1980s. The Tour takes in arenas and theatres around the UK and still runs today. The tours are organised by Tony Denton Promotions. The tour has now progressed to countries such as Japan and Australia as well as several European countries.

== Artists who have performed ==
- 1927
- A Flock of Seagulls
- ABC
- Altered Images
- Bananarama
- The Beat
- Belinda Carlisle
- Belle Stars
- Billy Ocean
- Boy George
- Brother Beyond
- Bucks Fizz
- Captain Sensible
- Chas & Dave
- Chesney Hawkes
- China Crisis
- Curiosity Killed the Cat
- Cutting Crew
- Doctor and the Medics
- Five Star
- Go West
- Hazel O'Connor
- Heaven 17
- Howard Jones
- The Human League
- Imagination
- Jason Donovan
- Jimmy Somerville
- Johnny Hates Jazz
- Kajagoogoo
- Katrina Leskanich
- Kid Creole and the Coconuts
- Kim Wilde
- Limahl
- Living in a Box
- Marc Almond
- Midge Ure
- Modern Romance
- Mondo Rock
- Nick Heyward
- Nik Kershaw
- Odyssey
- Paul Young
- Pepsi & Shirlie
- Rick Astley
- Sinitta
- The Three Degrees
- T'Pau
- Tony Hadley
- Toyah
- Visage
- The Weather Girls
