= Bobby McVay =

British singer and radio broadcaster

Robert (Bobby) McVay (born Glasgow) is a British singer and radio broadcaster.

In 1983, he represented the United Kingdom in the Eurovision Song Contest as a member of the band Sweet Dreams. Singing the song "I'm Never Giving Up", the trio came sixth, with 79 points. The song reached No. 21 in the UK Singles chart, remaining on the chart for eight weeks. McVay had previously fronted the group Lovin' Feeling in the 1982 A Song For Europe contest, singing "Different Worlds, Different People." The song placed fourth of the eight entries.

After his pop career, Bobby became a local radio presenter at Radio Wyvern in Worcester before joining Red Dragon Radio in South Wales. At one point, Bobby moved to Touch AM but later returned to Red Dragon. After over a decade at Red Dragon and Touch, including stints on the breakfast show, mid-mornings and afternoons, McVay left. He subsequently co-anchored the breakfast show on rival South Wales regional station Real Radio.

In 2015, McVay was invited to join the Bucks Fizz spin-off group The Fizz as their fourth member. He accepted the position and the group toured extensively throughout 2016. In 2017, they released their first album, The F-Z of Pop which charted at No.25 in the UK albums chart. Much media attention surrounded the release and the group continued on a promotional tour of the album as well as several TV appearances.

McVay announced his leave from The Fizz in January 2018, stating difficulties with travelling back and forth to the UK from his home in Italy.
