= Jay Aston =

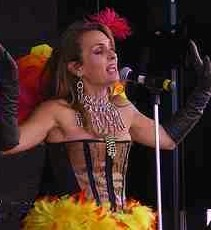
- Jay Aston in 2009

Background information
- Born: Jay Hilda Aston; 4 May 1961 (age 65); Purley, Surrey, England
- Genres: Pop
- Occupations: Singer; dancer
- Instrument: Vocals
- Years active: 1981–present
- Labels: RCA; Angel Air
- Member of: Fizz
- Formerly of: Bucks Fizz
- Website: JayAston.co.uk

Jay Hilda Aston (born 4 May 1961 in Purley, Surrey) is a British singer and occasional songwriter. She was a member of the British pop group Bucks Fizz from 1981 to 1985. She was the youngest member of the group's original line-up, aged 19 when they won the 1981 Eurovision Song Contest. During Aston's membership, the group had 12 of their 13 UK top 40 hit singles, including three number one hits. Since 2009, she has performed alongside fellow original Bucks Fizz members Cheryl Baker and Mike Nolan. The group used to perform under the name the Original Bucks Fizz but are now known as the Fizz.

== Career ==
=== Background ===
Aston was born in Purley, Surrey, and came from a theatrical family. Her father was a comedian, while her mother had been a dancer before becoming her husband's straight man. They also performed as acrobats. Her brother Lance performed at the 1980 Eurovision Song Contest with the band Prima Donna. Aston herself trained as a dancer, singer and actress at the Italia Conti School of Speech and Drama and performed on stage many times in her teens, mainly as a dancer. She was named "Miss Purley" in 1978 and competed in the subsequent Miss England contest, in which she was unplaced. The interval act at the televised Miss England 1978 competition was the group Co-Co, who had just been selected to represent Britain in the Eurovision Song Contest 1978 and featured Cheryl Baker in the line-up.

=== Bucks Fizz ===
Aston was, along with Baker, one of the four members of Bucks Fizz when they were formed in 1981 to compete in that year's Eurovision Song Contest. They won with "Making Your Mind Up" and the song went to No1 in many countries, including the United Kingdom. The group went on to become one of the top-selling groups of the 1980s, scoring many hit singles and albums over the next few years, including two more British No1s: "The Land of Make Believe" and "My Camera Never Lies". Aston designed many of the group's stage outfits. In 1983, she performed the lead vocal on the song "When We Were Young" that went on to become one of the group's biggest hits.

Aston became known for her love of physical exercise and released a keep-fit album in early 1984 called Shape Up and Dance. She was the victim of an attack while out jogging but fought off the attacker and recovered from the incident.

In December 1984, while on tour, Bucks Fizz were involved in a tour coach crash in which Nolan was seriously injured. By this time, tensions within the group had risen to the point that Aston was eager to leave but was still under contract. However, the following year, she left the group in acrimonious circumstances. Aston became the subject of many newspaper headlines on her sudden departure where it emerged that she had had an affair with the group's producer, Andy Hill, who was the husband of Bucks Fizz creator, Nichola Martin. The group's management company took Aston to court under the terms of her contract but dropped the case in the midst of the trial and agreed to release her from it. However, an injunction was placed on her against commencing a solo career that took two years to settle and resulted in her selling her Kensington home. In addition, all eight cases were settled out of court after the case was investigated by the attorney general.

=== After Bucks Fizz ===
Forced to sell her house, Aston was living in a small bedsit in Croydon on housing benefits in the early 1990s. Her brother had married Shakespear's Sister star Marcella Detroit who encouraged her to record new songs. In 1993, Aston released a single, "Naked Phoenix", and recorded an album of songs. This same year she contributed a song to the controversial Michael Winner film Dirty Weekend, although Aston walked out of the film's premiere in disgust. By 1995, she was living with her parents but was still writing and recording music. Around this time she met and began dating guitarist Dave Colquhoun, whom she married in 1999. During the latter part of the 1990s and early 2000s, Aston toured with her band Aston, performing rock and pop tracks, many of which she wrote herself.

In 2001, she set up a performing arts school in her name, The Jay Aston Theatre Arts School, teaching children aged between two and 17.

In 2002, she was involved in a cover band called Monster Boogie, and she also appeared in an episode of Never Mind the Buzzcocks as one of the mystery guests in the identity parade round. The following year she released an album, Alive and Well, featuring 13 tracks, all of which she co-wrote with her husband.

The glory years of Bucks Fizz, mainly focusing on Aston, were portrayed in 2005 in a drag lip-synch show, Night of a Thousand Jay Astons, at the Edinburgh Festival Fringe after its début in London. Aston was played by one female and three male performers. The life of Aston was told through an outrageous parody, and was described in review as "hilariously over the top". The show has also been staged at other venues, including the Comedy Theatre in Dublin in May 2006 and the Soho Theatre in London in summer 2007.

Another solo album, a three-disc box-set Lamb or Lizard, was released in July 2006 through her website, which featured recordings from before and after her work with Bucks Fizz.

In March 2007, she appeared in the Comic Relief video "I'm Gonna Be (500 Miles)" a comic cover version of the Proclaimers song, dancing with the other three original members of Bucks Fizz, and also Shelley Preston, who had replaced Aston in the group in 1985. This was the first time that Aston had met the group since 1985. She said that relations between them had improved, but not to the extent that they could work together as a group again: "I'm kind of on good terms with all of them individually. But as a band, it just doesn't work, and it's a shame, but it doesn't. There's always been two camps – Cheryl's camp and Bobby's camp, and I was the one in Bobby's camp, and Mike was always in Cheryl's camp."

A new Bucks Fizz CD with a bonus DVD, The Very Best of Bucks Fizz, was released in May 2007. Aston appeared alone on the National Lottery to promote the album. In August 2008, Aston once again joined up with Bucks Fizz members Mike Nolan, Cheryl Baker and Shelley Preston, when she appeared on "Pop Goes The Band", a television show celebrating 1980s acts – with one episode devoted to the reuniting of Bucks Fizz. This programme was shown on Living TV in March 2009.

In May 2013, Aston appeared on the second series of UK singing talent show The Voice, singing Muse's "Time is Running Out", but was not chosen by any of the judges. Aside from her duties in the Fizz, Aston has also appeared in pantomime a number of times. In 2019, She appeared as the Wicked Stepmother in Snow White at the Queens Theatre, Barnstaple.

=== The Original Bucks Fizz, The Fizz ===
In 2004, Bucks Fizz members Cheryl Baker, Mike Nolan and Shelley Preston reunited to form the Original Bucks Fizz and performed in concert throughout the UK. In April 2009, Preston announced that she was leaving the group and Aston agreed to join – the first time she had been a part of Bucks Fizz since 1985. They toured the UK extensively, renamed from 2016 as The Fizz and their 2017 album The F–Z of Pop became a top 30 hit in the UK Charts.

Mike Nolan retired in November 2024 and the Fizz now consists of Aston, Baker and two new male singers. They perform Bucks Fizz back catalogue and have recorded new material.

=== Acting ===
Before Bucks Fizz, Aston had ambitions to become an actress, but her career in this field encompassed only minor roles in To the Manor Born and Citizen Smith. In 2008, Aston was cast as Claudia Brite in the film The Last Days of Edgar Harding which was shot in August 2008 and screened in 2010. The film has never seen a mainstream release.

== Personal life ==
Aston married guitarist Dave Colquhoun in August 1999 in Greenwich, London. They have a daughter. In 2011, they lived in Tatsfield, Surrey. Aston's mother Hilda died in 2007, while her father Ted died in 2009. Aston continues to teach dance and performance at her performing arts school in Kent. She was diagnosed with mouth cancer in June 2018. Since then, she has had surgery, and said the outlook was "positive".

In 2022, Aston said that her daughter had been diagnosed with meningitis. Aston's daughter Josie recovered and later appeared in a Season 5 episode of the TV show Rich Kids Go Skint.

== Politics ==
On 27 August 2019, the Brexit Party announced that Aston would be standing as its candidate in the London constituency of Kensington, at the time held by the Labour Party. She came fifth after receiving 384 votes (0.9%).

== Discography ==
Solo albums

- 1984: Shape Up and Dance
- 1993: Lamb or Lizard (briefly sold on Aston's website)
- 2003: Alive and Well
- 2006: Lamb or Lizard (3-CD retrospective)
- 2016: I-Spy
