= Bucks Fizz discography =

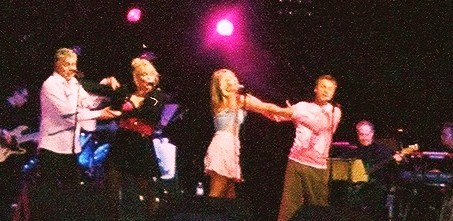
- Studio albums: 5
- Live albums: 1
- Compilation albums: numerous
- Singles: 24
- Video albums: 4
- Music videos: 18

Formed in 1981, Bucks Fizz reached number one three times in the UK and scored 20 chart hits. Their biggest selling single in the UK was "The Land of Make Believe", while worldwide it is "Making Your Mind Up" which sold over 4 million copies. The group first entered the UK singles chart on 28 March 1981 and they last charted on 19 November 1988. With albums, the group saw less success, but still managed to chart seven times, with three reaching the top 20 and five in the top 40. Are You Ready is the biggest selling of these.

Since 2004, a spin-off group, called The Fizz was in operation, consisting of three of the original members of the band. In 2017, they returned the Bucks Fizz name to the UK charts with the album The F-Z of Pop and went on to release a further three albums.

== Albums ==
=== Studio albums ===
| Title | Album details | Peak chart positions | | | | | | Certifications |
| Title | Album details | UK | AUS | GER | NED | NZ | SWE | Certifications |
|---|---|---|---|---|---|---|---|---|
| Bucks Fizz | Released: July 1981; Label: RCA Records | 14 | 35 | — | 50 | 20 | 29 | UK: Gold |
| Are You Ready | Released: May 1982; Label: RCA Records | 10 | 30 | 61 | — | 18 | — | UK: Gold |
| Hand Cut | Released: March 1983; Label: RCA Records | 17 | — | — | — | — | — | UK: Silver |
| I Hear Talk | Released: November 1984; Label: RCA Records | 66 | — | — | — | — | — | |
| Writing on the Wall | Released: November 1986; Label: Polydor Records | 89 | — | — | — | — | — | |
"—" denotes items that did not chart or were not released in that territory.

=== Compilation albums ===
| Title | Album details | Peak chart positions | |
| Title | Album details | UK | SCO |
|---|---|---|---|
| El Mundo de Ilusion | Released: 1982; Label: RCA/Victor Records; Note: Compilation of songs in Spanish | —N/a | —N/a |
| Bucks Fizz (US release) | Released: July 1982; Label: RCA Records | —N/a | —N/a |
| Greatest Hits | Released: 1983; Label: RCA Records | 25 | — |
| The Story So Far | Released: December 1988; Label: Stylus Records | — | — |
| The Ultimate Anthology | Released: 2005; Label: Sony/BMG | — | — |
| The Lost Masters | Released: 2006; Label: Sony/BMG | — | — |
| The Very Best of Bucks Fizz | Released: 2007; Label: Sony/BMG | 40 | 47 |
| The Lost Masters 2 - The Final Cut | Released: 2008; Label: Sony/BMG | — | — |
| Up Until Now... (The 30th Anniversary Hits Collection) | Released: 2011 (Europe); Label: Camden/Sony | — | — |
| Remixes & Rarities | Released: 2014; Label: Cherry Pop | — | — |
| The Land of Make Believe (The Definitive Collection) | Released: 2023; Label: Cherry Pop | — | — |
"—" denotes items that did not chart or were not released in that territory.

=== Live albums ===
| Title | Album details |
|---|---|
| Live at the Fairfield Hall | Released: 1991; Label: Jet Records |

== Singles ==
| Year | Title | Peak chart positions | | | | | | | | | | | Certifications | Album |
| Year | Title | UK | AUS | AUT | BEL | GER | IRE | LUX | NED | NZ | SWE | SWI | Certifications | Album |
|---|---|---|---|---|---|---|---|---|---|---|---|---|---|---|
| 1981 | "Making Your Mind Up" | 1 | 6 | 1 | 1 | 5 | 1 | 1 | 1 | 3 | 2 | 3 | UK: Gold | Bucks Fizz |
| 1981 | "Piece of the Action" | 12 | 26 | — | 19 | 35 | 10 | 4 | 26 | 31 | — | — | UK: Silver | Bucks Fizz |
| 1981 | "One of Those Nights" | 20 | — | — | — | — | 29 | 17 | — | — | — | — | | Bucks Fizz |
| 1981 | "Another Night" | — | — | — | — | — | — | — | — | — | — | — | | Are You Ready |
| 1981 | "The Land of Make Believe" | 1 | 15 | 7 | 1 | 3 | 1 | 1 | 2 | 44 | — | — | | Are You Ready |
| 1982 | "My Camera Never Lies" | 1 | 63 | — | 17 | 31 | 2 | 1 | 22 | — | — | — | UK: Silver | Are You Ready |
| 1982 | "Now Those Days Are Gone" | 8 | — | — | — | — | 5 | 4 | — | — | — | — | UK: Silver | Are You Ready |
| 1982 | "Are You Ready" | — | 93 | — | — | — | — | — | — | — | — | — | | Are You Ready |
| 1982 | "Easy Love" | — | — | — | — | — | — | — | — | — | — | — | | Are You Ready |
| 1982 | "If You Can't Stand the Heat" | 10 | 93 | — | — | 75 | 10 | 11 | 41 | — | — | — | UK: Silver | Hand Cut |
| 1983 | "Run for Your Life" | 14 | — | — | — | — | 8 | 7 | — | — | — | — | | Hand Cut |
| 1983 | "When We Were Young" | 10 | — | 20 | 19 | 52 | 6 | 8 | 17 | — | — | — | | Greatest Hits |
| 1983 | "London Town" | 34 | — | — | — | 66 | 24 | 26 | — | — | — | — | | Greatest Hits |
| 1983 | "Rules of the Game" | 57 | — | — | — | — | — | — | — | — | — | — | | Greatest Hits |
| 1984 | "Talking in Your Sleep" | 15 | — | — | — | — | 14 | 12 | — | — | — | — | | I Hear Talk |
| 1984 | "Golden Days" | 42 | — | — | — | — | — | — | — | — | — | — | | I Hear Talk |
| 1984 | "I Hear Talk" | 34 | — | — | — | — | 29 | 25 | — | — | — | — | | I Hear Talk |
| 1985 | "You and Your Heart So Blue" | 43 | — | — | — | — | — | — | — | — | — | — | | Writing on the Wall |
| 1985 | "Magical" | 57 | — | — | — | — | — | — | — | — | — | — | | Writing on the Wall |
| 1986 | "New Beginning (Mamba Seyra)" | 8 | — | — | 22 | — | 11 | 5 | 24 | — | — | — | | Writing on the Wall |
| 1986 | "Love the One You're With" | 47 | — | — | — | — | — | — | — | — | — | — | | Writing on the Wall |
| 1986 | "Keep Each Other Warm" | 45 | — | — | — | — | — | — | — | — | — | — | | Writing on the Wall |
| 1988 | "Heart of Stone" | 50 | — | — | — | — | — | — | — | — | — | — | | The Story So Far |
| 1989 | "You Love Love" | — | — | — | — | — | — | — | — | — | — | — | | The Story So Far |
"—" denotes items that did not chart or were not released in that territory.

== Video / DVD releases ==
| Year | Album title |
|---|---|
| 1986 | Less Bucks More Fizz - Bucks Fizz Greatest Hits: Release date: June 1986; Format: VHS; Label: RCA / Columbia; Compilation of music videos |
| 1992 | The Best of Bucks Fizz: Release date: 1992; Format: VHS; Label: Independently released, Razzmatazz Management Ltd.; Compilation of music videos |
| 2007 | The Very Best of Bucks Fizz: Release date: May 2007; Format: DVD; Label: Sony BMG; Compilation of music videos |
| 2010 | The Bucks Fizz Story: Release date: August 2010; Format: DVD; Label: Glassbeach; Documentary |

== Music videos ==
The following is a list of music videos which were produced to accompany their singles. No videos were made for "One of Those Nights", "Magical" or "You Love Love" (or non-UK releases). "Making Your Mind Up" was a BBC-made production for the Eurovision Song Contest 1981 previews.

| Year | Song | Director |
|---|---|---|
| 1981 | "Making Your Mind Up" | A BBC production |
| 1981 | "Piece of the Action" | Tim Pope |
| 1981 | "The Land of Make Believe" | Unknown |
| 1982 | "My Camera Never Lies" | Terry Bedford |
| 1982 | "Now Those Days Are Gone" | Terry Bedford |
| 1982 | "If You Can't Stand the Heat" | Tony Halton |
| 1983 | "Run for Your Life" | Michael Geoghegan |
| 1983 | "When We Were Young" | Unknown |
| 1983 | "London Town" | Dieter Trattmann |
| 1983 | "Rules of the Game" | D. Trattmann |
| 1984 | "Talking in Your Sleep" | D. Trattmann |
| 1984 | "Golden Days" | Pete Cornish |
| 1984 | "I Hear Talk" | Terence Bulley |
| 1985 | "You and Your Heart so Blue" | Richard Duplock & Andrew Coggins |
| 1986 | "New Beginning (Mamba Seyra)" | D. Trattmann |
| 1986 | "Love the One You're With" | Unknown |
| 1986 | "Keep Each Other Warm" | Philip Richardson |
| 1988 | "Heart of Stone" | Unknown |
