= Greatest Hits (Bucks Fizz album) =

Greatest hits album by Bucks Fizz
- Released: November 1983
- Recorded: March 1981 – October 1983
- Genre: Pop
- Label: RCA Records
- Producer: Andy Hill; Brian Tench

Bucks Fizz chronology
Hand Cut (1983)	Greatest Hits (1983)	I Hear Talk (1984)

Singles from Greatest Hits
- 1. "When We Were Young" Released: June 1983; 2. "London Town" Released: September 1983; 3. "Rules of the Game" Released: November 1983

Professional ratings
Review scores
Source	Rating
Allmusic	3/5 stars

Greatest Hits is a greatest hits album by the English pop group Bucks Fizz. It was released in November 1983.

== Overview ==
This was the first singles collection by Bucks Fizz - released just under three years after their formation.

By this time, the group had accumulated 11 hit singles - 3 of them No.1s and 9 of them top 20 hits. The album featured new singles, "When We Were Young", "London Town", "Rules of the Game" and a new song, "Oh Suzanne".

The album fared disappointingly on the charts compared to previous albums as it fought against other albums in the Christmas rush. Originally on its run up to Christmas it had stalled at No. 38, but later rose again - to No.25 - in January. The album remained on the charts for 13 weeks. The album was backed by an advertising campaign, which included TV.

The album was released on CD a few months later in 1984 and became one of the earliest CD releases by RCA.

== Track listing ==
#	Side One	Time
1.	"My Camera Never Lies"; Writers: Andy Hill / Nichola Martin; Producer: Andy Hill	3:47
2.	"London Town"; Writer: Andy Hill; Producer: Andy Hill	3:11
3.	"Piece of the Action"; Writer: Andy Hill; Producer: Andy Hill	3:37
4.	"Now Those Days Are Gone"; Writers: Andy Hill / Nichola Martin; Producer:Andy Hill	3:32
5.	"Making Your Mind Up"; Writers: Andy Hill / John Danter; Producer: Andy Hill	2:38
6.	"When We Were Young"; Writer: Warren Bacall; Producers: Brian Tench / Andy Hill	4:05

#	Side Two	Time
7.	"The Land of Make Believe"; Writers: Andy Hill / Pete Sinfield; Producer: Andy Hill	3:45
8.	"One of Those Nights"; Writers: Steve Glen / Mike Burns / Dave Most; Producer: Andy Hill	4:24
9.	"Oh Suzanne"; Writers: Andy Hill / Warren Bacall; Producers: Brian Tench / Andy Hill	4:45
10.	"If You Can't Stand the Heat"; Writers: Andy Hill / Ian Bairnson; Producer: Andy Hill	3:33
11.	"Run for Your Life"; Writers: Andy Hill / Ian Bairnson; Producer: Andy Hill	4:08
12.	"Rules of the Game"; Writer: Warren Bacall; Producers: Brian Tench / Andy Hill	4:03

== Charts ==
Weekly chart performance for Greatest Hits
Chart (1983)	Peak position
UK Albums (OCC)	25
