= Live at the Fairfield Hall, Croydon =

Live album by Bucks Fizz
- Released: March 1991
- Recorded: September 1990
- Genre: Pop
- Label: Jet Records

Bucks Fizz chronology
| The Story So Far (1988) | Live at the Fairfield Hall, Croydon (1991) | The Ultimate Anthology (2005) |

Professional ratings
Review scores
| Source | Rating |
|---|---|
| Allmusic | 3/5 stars |

Live at the Fairfield Hall, Croydon is a live album released in 1991 by pop group Bucks Fizz. It was their only release with Jet Records.

== Background ==
The album was recorded in September 1990 and released six months later to commemorate the group's 10th Anniversary. By this time, the group was down to three members: Bobby G, Cheryl Baker and Mike Nolan, member Shelley Preston having left at the end of 1989. The album consisted of many of Bucks Fizz's hit singles and cover versions of popular hits, although didn't include the entire concert. The cover photos were not taken at the Fairfield Halls gig as featured on the album, as the shots taken had been damaged, and so new ones were taken in early March 1991 at a private gig at the Grosvenor House Hotel in London. The album was released two weeks later in time for their Eurovision anniversary on 4 April. The release of the album coincided with the closure of record company Jet, resulting in it receiving little promotion. The album failed to chart.

In 2012, during sessions for The Lost Masters albums, two tracks taken from this concert were uncovered which had not been included. These were medleys - one of old Motown hits, the other of Rolling Stones songs. These were included on the third edition of The Lost Masters.

Fairfield Halls is a concert venue in Croydon, South London.

== Track listing ==
Side one

1. "Heart of Stone" (Andy Hill / Pete Sinfield) 4:20
2. "Love the One You're With" (Stephen Stills) 4:27
3. "My Camera Never Lies" (Andy Hill / Nichola Martin) 3:48
4. "We Built This City" (Bernie Taupin, Martin Page, Dennis Lambert, Peter Wolf) 4:29
5. "A Groovy Kind of Love" (Carole Bayer Sager, Toni Wine) 3:00
6. "Run for Your Life" (Andy Hill / Ian Bairnson) 4:03
7. "You're the Voice" (Andy Qunta / Keith Reid / Maggie Ryder / Chris Thompson) 4:35

Side two

1. "I Hear Talk" / "You and Your Heart so Blue" (Andy Hill / Pete Sinfield) 5:35
2. "I Knew You Were Waiting" (Simon Climie / Dennis Morgan) 3:52
3. "Now Those Days Are Gone" (Andy Hill / Nichola Martin) 3:36
4. "Making Your Mind Up" (Andy Hill / John Danter) 2:27
5. "The Land of Make Believe" (Andy Hill / Pete Sinfield) 5:10
6. "New Beginning (Mamba Seyra)" (Mike Myers / Tony Gibber) 5:09

The album was later re-issued on CD as "The Best and Rest of Bucks Fizz". This version omitted "A Groovy Kind of Love".

== Personnel ==
- Bobby G - Vocals
- Cheryl Baker - Vocals
- Mike Nolan - Vocals
- John Thomas - Keyboards
- Tom Marshall - Keyboards and Vocals
- Alan Coates - Guitar and Vocals
- Steve Stroud - Bass and Vocals
- Guy Richman - Drums
- Jill Shirley - Personal Manager
- Neil Halliday - Production Manager
- Mark Jones / Pete Skan - Sound
- Simon Higgs - Monitor Engineer
- Hugh Calder - Backline Engineer
- Trevor Vallis - Mixer
- Bobby G - Assistant Mixer
- Peter Mulley - Assistant Engineer
