= Hand Cut =

Studio album by Bucks Fizz
- Released: 1 March 1983
- Recorded: 1982–83
- Genre: Pop
- Length: 40:44
- Label: RCA
- Producers: Andy Hill; Brian Tench; Bobby G

Bucks Fizz chronology
Are You Ready (1982)	Hand Cut (1983)	Greatest Hits (1983)

Singles from Hand Cut
- 1. "If You Can't Stand the Heat" Released: November 1982; 2. "Run for Your Life" Released: March 1983; 3. "You Love Love" Released: May 1989

Hand Cut is the third studio album by the English pop group Bucks Fizz. It was released on 1 March 1983 and features the UK top 20 hits, "If You Can't Stand the Heat" and "Run for Your Life".

== Overview ==
Hand Cut continued the group's success, which had been building for two years since their Eurovision win.

The first single from the album was "If You Can't Stand the Heat" in November 1982, which became their fourth consecutive top ten hit in the UK charts. This was followed in March 1983 by "Run for Your Life", which reached UK#14. Along with this came the album's release, which received favourable reviews and became their third UK top 20 album. Remaining on the chart for three months, Hand Cut was certified silver by the BPI. The album also coincided with a successful 40 date UK tour.

Despite this, the group's management were concerned that the singles hadn't performed as well as the ones on their previous album and took the decision not to release any further singles from Hand Cut. Realising that their fans were now slightly older, they made a move for a more adult market - a factor which would remain for the rest of the group's recording career, but would ultimately provide their downfall. The following single became the hard edged "When We Were Young", which in the Summer of 1983 returned Bucks Fizz to the top ten, and a Greatest Hits compilation followed.

Some time after the group had fallen out of vogue, their record company, RCA made one last attempt to revive fortunes by releasing a single taken from this album six years after its release. The song was the ballad "You Love Love". It failed to chart and remains the group's last ever UK single release.

Other notable tracks from the album include "10,9,8,7,6,5,4" which was later covered by another Eurovision-winning group, Herreys. While today, fans of the group bemoan the lack of a third single from the album and cite "I'd Like to Say I Love You" as the perfect choice, which was voted in a poll as the group's all-time best song.

Hand Cut was released on compact disc for the first time in June 2004. In 2008, alternate versions of tracks "Run for Your Life", "If You Can't Stand the Heat", "I'd Like to Say I Love You" and "You Love Love" were featured on The Lost Masters 2 - The Final Cut compilation.

== Reception and reviews ==
As with the previous album, Hand Cut received many good reviews in the media. Smash Hits gave the album a 7 out of 10 rating, but thought that the over production was sometimes overpowering and preferred the quieter songs on the album (referencing "Where the Ending Starts"). The review stated that the album was well-produced however, saying it was "...another busy Andy Hill-directed epic. The trademarks are all here: ferocious production, terrific drum sound and booming choruses". Record Mirror claimed that "Run for Your Life" was too similar to a previous single "My Camera Never Lies", but did state that the group were now making "exceedingly good pop music". Writing for Irish magazine, RTÉ Guide, reviewer Brendan Martin gave the album a positive review, saying "Hand Cut follows the formula of their previous albums. There are two singles along with a selection of good pop songs". The New Straits Times gave the album a largely negative review saying that it was "overly clean, lacking a rough hewn edge". It did however single out two tracks which rose above "the mundane", namely "10,9,8,7,6,5,4" and "If You Can't Stand the Heat" calling them "catchy".

NME gave "Run for Your Life" a particularly good review, saying that the group were at their peak and singling out praise to producer, Andy Hill. Member Mike Nolan has listed track "You Love Love" as the best of their own songs.

In 2017, Classic Pop reviewed the album positively, saying that it was "state-of-the-art pop", mentioning tracks "10,9,8,7,6,5,4" and "Running Out of Time".

== Track listing ==
Side One
No.	Title	Writer(s)	Producer	Length
1.	"Run for Your Life"	Andy Hill, Ian Bairnson	Andy Hill	4:12
2.	"10, 9, 8, 7, 6, 5, 4"	Steve Glen, Matthew James, Bill Edwards	Brian Tench with Bobby G	4:29
3.	"I Do It All for You"	Andy Hill, Alan Coates	Andy Hill	3:58
4.	"Where the Ending Starts"	Andy Hill	Andy Hill	3:57
5.	"Surrender Your Heart"	Bobby G	Brian Tench with Bobby G	4:09

Side Two
No.	Title	Writer(s)	Producer	Length
6.	"If You Can't Stand the Heat"	Andy Hill, Ian Bairnson	Andy Hill	3:35
7.	"I'd Like to Say I Love You"	Warren Harry	Andy Hill	4:30
8.	"You Love Love"	Andy Sells	Andy Hill	3:40
9.	"Shot Me Through the Heart"	Andy Hill, Nichola Martin	Andy Hill	4:25
10.	"Running Out of Time"	Andy Hill, Ian Bairnson	Andy Hill	3:45

2004 Reissue Bonus Tracks
No.	Title	Writer(s)	Producer	Length
11.	"If You Can't Stand the Heat" (12" version)	Andy Hill, Ian Bairnson	Andy Hill	5:39
12.	"Stepping Out" (B-side of "If You Can't Stand the Heat")	Bucks Fizz	Bucks Fizz	3:28
13.	"When the Love Has Gone" (Extra track on 12" of "When We Were Young)	Andy Hill, Nichola Martin	Andy Hill	5:50
14.	"London Town" (Extended Club Mix)	Andy Hill	Andy Hill	6:38
15.	"Identity" (B-side of "London Town")	Bucks Fizz	Bobby G	2:40
16.	"When We Were at War" (B-side of "Rules of the Game)	Bucks Fizz	Bobby G	6:00
17.	"Pinball Wizard / Hot Stuff / Da Ya Think I'm Sexy? / Knock on Wood / Rockin' All Over the World" (hidden track)	Pete Townshend / Pete Bellotte, Harold Faltermeyer, Keith Forsey / Rod Stewart, Carmine Appice / Eddie Floyd, Steve Cropper / John Fogerty	Bucks Fizz	5:50

== Personnel ==
=== Bucks Fizz ===
- Bobby G - Lead vocals on "I'd Like to Say I Love You", "Shot Me Through the Heart", "When the Love has Gone", "London Town" and "When We Were at War"
- Mike Nolan - Lead vocals on "Surrender Your Heart", "Stepping Out" and "Identity"
- Jay Aston - Lead vocals on "Where the Ending Starts" and "Running out of Time"
- Cheryl Baker - Lead vocals on "You Love Love"

=== Musicians ===
- Andy Hill - Keyboards, Guitars, Bass
- Nichola Martin - Keyboards, Backing vocals
- Richard Cottle - Keyboards
- Pete Wingfield - Keyboards
- John Reed - Bass
- Ian Bairnson - Guitars
- Graham Broad - Drums, Percussion
- Chris Hunter - Saxophone
- Spike - Trombones
- Guy Barker - Trumpets
- Anne Dudley - String arrangements

=== Production ===
- Recorded at Mayfair Studios, Utopia Studios, Power Plant Studios, R.G. Jones Studios, Comforts Place Studios
- Andy Hill - Producer
- Brian Tench - Producer on "10,9,8,7,6,5,4" and "Surrender Your Heart"
- Bobby G - Producer on "Identity" and "When We Were at War". Co-producer on "10,9,8,7,6,5,4" and "Surrender Your Heart"
- Bucks Fizz - Producer on "Stepping Out"
- Brian Tench, Martin Webster, John Hudson - Engineers
- Dean Murphy - Executive Producer of CD re-issue

=== Design ===
- John Thornton - Photography and Cover design concept
- Andrew Christian - Design and art direction
- Gered Mankowitz - Inner sleeve photography

== Charts ==
Weekly chart performance for Hand Cut
Chart (1983)	Peak position
UK Albums (OCC)	17
