= I Hear Talk =

Studio album by Bucks Fizz
- Released: 12 November 1984
- Recorded: 1983–1984
- Genre: Pop
- Length: 41:26
- Label: RCA Records
- Producers: Andy Hill; Brian Tench; Terry Britten; Pip Williams

Bucks Fizz chronology
Greatest Hits (1983)	I Hear Talk (1984)	Writing on the Wall (1986)

Singles from I Hear Talk
- 1. "Talking in Your Sleep" Released: 13 August 1984; 2. "Golden Days" Released: October 1984; 3. "I Hear Talk" Released: 15 December 1984

I Hear Talk is the fourth studio album by the English pop group Bucks Fizz and their last under contract to RCA Records. Released in November 1984, the album featured the singles "Talking in Your Sleep", "Golden Days" and "I Hear Talk".

== Overview ==
Bucks Fizz had been consistently in the public eye for three years by the end of 1983 and so decided to keep a low profile for the first half of 1984 following the low-charting performance of their last single Rules of the Game. During this time recording sessions were held for their fourth album as well as the group embarking on a 40-date UK tour.

The group made a comeback in August with the single "Talking In Your Sleep" - a cover of a song by US band The Romantics. The single revitalised the group's career with its harder-edged rock sound and became a top twenty hit in the UK. Another single "Golden Days" (a reworking of a recent Cliff Richard song) was released in October, but failed to chart as highly. The album followed soon after and also received a tepid response, peaking at #66 - their lowest charting album to this point. A third and final single (the title track) was released in December, but coincided with a coach crash that the group suffered while on tour. Promotion for the single was limited due to this and although performed better in the charts than the previous single, it didn't restore them to their former glory.

During recording sessions for this album in early 1984, the group recorded the song "What's Love Got To Do With It" for possible inclusion. Around the same time the song was also recorded by US star, Tina Turner, who went on to have an International hit with it. The Bucks Fizz version went unreleased until 2000, when it was included as a bonus track on a CD re-release of their album, Are You Ready. The group recorded many of the tracks in Zurich. According to member Cheryl Baker, Jay Aston didn't attend these sessions, with her vocals being recorded later in the UK.

The album's sleeve featured a sepia-toned photograph of the group on the beach at Camber Sands, surrounded by a wide black border. The inside sleeve featured more shots taken at the same location. A review made mention that the album cover was "sophisticated and moody" but lamented that the girls were wearing less "revealing clothes". This was the group's final album both with their original record company, RCA and member Jay Aston, who quit the line-up the following year. It would be two years before the next album release.

I Hear Talk was re-released on Compact Disc in 2004 with additional bonus tracks. In 2006, alternate versions of tracks "Indebted to You", "Tears On the Ballroom Floor", "Cold War", "Breaking Me Up", "She Cries" and "Thief In the Night" were released on The Lost Masters - a collection of unreleased Bucks Fizz tracks. Two years later, a follow-up compilation gave further alternate versions of "Indebted to You", "Tears On the Ballroom Floor", "Golden Days", "Talking in Your Sleep" and "Breaking Me Up". More importantly however, the first of these albums produced an entirely new song taken from the I Hear Talk sessions - "Every Dream Has Broken". It is unknown why this song was never released, but fans of the group rated it as one of Bucks Fizz's favourite songs in a 2006 online poll.

== Reception and reviews ==
While Bucks Fizz were generally criticised in the media for producing lightweight pop music, their albums usually received favourable reviews. However, of their five studio albums, I Hear Talk seemed to gain the least recommendations. Record Mirror criticized the album by being "not much to shout about" and that it was "the same old bill of fare that you've heard at least 100 times before". The same magazine however said that alongside new albums by Wham!, Culture Club, Duran Duran and Frankie Goes to Hollywood it was a contender for the top 10.

Reviewing their single "I Hear Talk", pop group Bananarama said that the song was their best in a long time, stating "it has something the last few singles didn't". In a Smash Hits review, Morrissey said that the song "Golden Days" was "inexcusably dim", but received a rave review in Number One, saying "the sultry lead vocal is backed by the usual perfect three-part harmonies and a chorus that you'll not be able to get rid of for days. Great stuff". Number One also credited "Talking in Your Sleep" as being "raunchy". Journalist Mark Frith complimented the title track, labelling it "euphoric" and saying that it deserved to reach No.1.

In 2017, Classic Pop reviewed the album, saying that "Talking in Your Sleep" had "pre-echoes of Bon Jovi's "Livin' On a Prayer", while the title track was "slinky". It gave favourable mention to tracks "Indebted to You", "Breaking Me Up" and "She Cries", saying they were "mid-80s pop epics".

== Track listing ==
Side One
No.	Title	Writer(s)	Producer	Length
1.	"I Hear Talk"	Andy Hill, Pete Sinfield	Andy Hill	4:43
2.	"Indebted to You"	Andy Hill, Warren Bacall	Andy Hill	4:34
3.	"Tears on the Ballroom Floor"	Anthony Phillips, Roy Hill	Brian Tench	4:07
4.	"Cold War"	Dominic Bugatti	Brian Tench and Bobby G	3:52
5.	"Golden Days"	Terry Britten, Sue Shifrin	Terry Britten	4:14

Side Two
No.	Title	Writer(s)	Producer	Length
6.	"Talking in Your Sleep"	Marinos, Palmar, Skill, Canler, Pete Solley	Andy Hill	4:18
7.	"Breaking Me Up"	Andy Hill, Frank Musker	Andy Hill	4:16
8.	"January's Gone"	Andy Hill, Ian Bairnson	Andy Hill	4:45
9.	"She Cries"	Nik Kershaw	Pip Williams	3:37
10.	"Thief in the Night"	Andy Hill, Warren Bacall	Brian Tench	3:47

2004 Reissue Bonus Tracks
No.	Title	Writer(s)	Producer	Length
11.	"Don't Think You're Fooling Me"	Bobby G	Bobby G	3:50
12.	"Where Do I Go Now"	Cheryl Baker	Cheryl Baker, Adrian Sheppard, Richard Cottle	4:30
13.	"One Touch Too Much"	Andy Hill, Sue Shifrin	Big Note	3:49
14.	"Pulling Me Under"	Bobby G	Bobby G	4:15
15.	"Invisible"	Andy Hill, Mike Batt	Big Note	4:35
16.	"Evil Man"	Jay Aston	Big Note	3:54
17.	"Here's Looking At You"	Andy Hill, Pete Sinfield	Big Note	5:52
18.	"Young Hearts"	Andy Hill	Nick Tauber	4:05

== Personnel ==
- Bobby G - lead vocals on "I Hear Talk", "Indebted to You", "Golden Days", "Cold War", "Talking in Your Sleep", "Breaking Me Up", "She Cries", "Don't Think You're Fooling Me", "Pulling Me Under"
- Jay Aston - lead vocals on "Thief in the Night", "Invisible", "Evil Man"
- Cheryl Baker - lead vocals on "Tears on the Ballroom Floor", "Where Do I Go Now", "One Touch Too Much", "Young Hearts"
- Mike Nolan - lead vocals on "January's Gone"

Musicians

- Andy Hill - Keyboards, Guitar, Bass
- Simon Darlow - Keyboards
- Billy Livesey - Keyboards
- Richard Cottle - Keyboards
- Tobias Boshell - Keyboards
- Ian Bairnson - Guitar
- Terry Britten - Keyboards
- Pip Williams - Guitar
- John Read - Bass
- Gary Twigg - Bass
- Graham Broad - Drums and Percussion
- Charles Morgan - Drums and Percussion
- Bob Jenkins - Drums and Percussion
- Pete Toms - Trombone
- Luke Tunney - Trumpet
- Martin Dobson - Saxophone
- Peter Woodroffe - Fairlight programmer
- Shelley Preston - Vocals on "Here's Looking at You" and "Young Hearts" (bonus tracks)

Production

- Recorded at Power Play Studios, Zurich; Comforts Place Studios, Mayfair Studios, RAK Studios, London
- John Hudson, Martin Webster, Trevor Vallis, Brian Tench, Simon Sullivan, G. Jackman - Engineers
- Dean Murphy - Executive Producer of CD re-issue
- Simon Fowler - Photography
- Shoot that Tiger! - Art direction and design

== Charts ==
Weekly chart performance for I Hear Talk
Chart (1984)	Peak position
UK Albums (OCC)	66
