= Talking in Your Sleep (The Romantics song) =

1983 single by the Romantics

Single by the Romantics

from the album In Heat
- B-side: "I'm Hip"
- Released: September 1983
- Recorded: 1983
- Genre: New wave; pop; jangle pop
- Length: 3:54
- Label: Nemperor
- Songwriters: Coz Canler; Jimmy Marinos; Wally Palmar; Mike Skill; Peter Solley
- Producer: Peter Solley

The Romantics singles chronology
"No One Like You" (1981)	"Talking in Your Sleep" (1983)	"Rock You Up" (1983)

Music video
- "Talking in Your Sleep" on YouTube

"Talking in Your Sleep" is a song by American rock band the Romantics. Released in September 1983, It became the band's most successful single in the US, reaching No. 3 on the Billboard Hot 100 in early 1984, being their only US Top 10 hit. The song would have a release two months later in Australia and New Zealand, a release later that year in Japan, and in January 1984 in the UK. It failed to chart in both countries. It became a UK hit in August that year for British group Bucks Fizz. The song is in natural minor.

== Song history ==
It appeared on the Romantics' 1983 album In Heat and was the Romantics' biggest chart hit, garnering substantial radio airplay and a million in US 45 RPM single sales. Nemperor Records also released an extended 12" dance mix (Special Version remixed by John "Jelly Bean" Benitez; 5:35).

The song reached No. 3, where it remained for three weeks, on the Billboard Hot 100 in early 1984. It also went to No. 1 on the Dance/Disco Top 80 chart, as well as No. 2 on Billboard's Album Rock Tracks chart.

In Australia, "Talking in Your Sleep" climbed to No. 14 on the Australian Singles Chart (Kent Music Report).

== Music video ==
The song's music video, directed by Bob Dyke, was widely aired at the time on MTV and elsewhere. It featured the band moving among, and surrounded by, standing but seemingly sleeping, long lines of women in lingerie, pajamas, camisoles, teddies and other sleepwear.

== Chart performance ==
=== Weekly charts ===
1983–1984 weekly chart performance for "Talking in Your Sleep"
Chart (1983–1984)	Peak position
Australia (Kent Music Report)	14
Belgium (Ultratop 50 Flanders)	19
Belgium (VRT Top 30 Flanders)	17
Canada Top Singles (RPM)	1
Canada (CHUM)	1
France (IFOP)	30
Germany (GfK)	18
Netherlands (Dutch Top 40)	20
Netherlands (Single Top 100)	24
New Zealand (Recorded Music NZ)	20
Paraguay (UPI)	3
South Africa (Springbok Radio)	15
Sweden (Sverigetopplistan)	5
Switzerland (Schweizer Hitparade)	20
Uruguay (UPI)	9
US Billboard Hot 100	3
US Cash Box Top 100	4
US Dance/Disco Top 80 (Billboard)	1
US Top Rock Tracks (Billboard)	2

2023 weekly chart performance for "Talking in Your Sleep"
Chart (2023)	Peak position
US Hot Rock & Alternative Songs (Billboard)	24

=== Year-end charts ===
Year-end chart performance for "Talking in Your Sleep"
Chart (1984)	Position
Canada Top Singles (RPM)	19
US Billboard Hot 100	19
US Cash Box Top 100	34
US Dance/Disco Top 80 (Billboard)	16

== Bucks Fizz version ==
"Talking in Your Sleep"

Single by Bucks Fizz

from the album I Hear Talk
- B-side: "Don't Think You're Fooling Me"
- Released: August 13, 1984
- Genre: Pop
- Length: 4:18
- Label: RCA
- Songwriters: Canler; Skill; Palmar; Solley; Marinos
- Producer: Andy Hill

Bucks Fizz singles chronology
"Rules of the Game" (1983)	"Talking in Your Sleep" (1984)	"Golden Days" (1984)

Music video
- "Talking in Your Sleep" by Bucks Fizz on YouTube

The Romantics' single was unsuccessful in the United Kingdom, but in August 1984, the song became well-known when pop group Bucks Fizz covered it. This version reached No. 15 on the UK Singles Chart. It was produced by Andy Hill and featured on their fourth album, I Hear Talk. The single was the group's first for nine months and became their biggest hit since "When We Were Young", a year previously. It was also released as a limited-edition EP, which included the live tracks "Twentieth Century Hero" and a cover of Chris de Burgh's "Don't Pay the Ferryman". The B-side, "Don't Think You're Fooling Me" was written and produced by band member Bobby G.

=== Track listing ===
7" vinyl

1. "Talking in Your Sleep" (Canler / Skill / Palmar / Solley / Marinos) – (4.18)
2. "Don't Think You're Fooling Me" (Bobby G) – (3.50)

12" vinyl

1. "Talking in Your Sleep" (Extended Mix) – (8.39)
2. "Don't Think You're Fooling Me" – (3.50)

Limited edition EP

1. "Talking in Your Sleep – (4.18)
2. "Don't Think You're Fooling Me" – (3.50)
3. "Twentieth Century Hero" (Live) (Andy Hill / Pete Sinfield) – (3.20)
4. "Don't Pay the Ferryman" (Live) (Chris de Burgh) – (3.56)

=== Weekly charts ===
Chart (1984)	Peak position
Ireland (IRMA)	14
UK Singles (Official Charts)	15

== Sampling ==
Canadian singer The Weeknd interpolated the chorus of "Talking in Your Sleep" in his song "Secrets" from his 2016 album, Starboy. It peaked at No. 47 in both the UK and US, while also charting in other territories.

== In popular culture ==
"Talking In Your Sleep" appears in the 2023 film Five Nights At Freddy's, where it is played several times, functioning as the main song that the animatronic characters (Freddy, Bonnie, and Chica) perform on stage.

The song also appears in the season 2 premiere of the television series Stranger Things, where it is heard playing on the radio inside Steve's car.
