= Levenwick =

Coordinates: 59.976°N 1.269°W

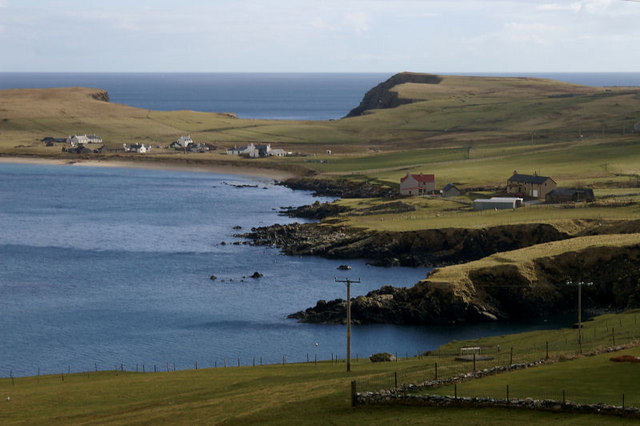
- Levenwick

- Location within Shetland
- OS grid reference: HU407213
- Civil parish: Dunrossness
- Council area: Shetland
- Lieutenancy area: Shetland
- Country: Scotland
- Sovereign state: United Kingdom
- Post town: SHETLAND
- Postcode district: ZE2
- Dialling code: 01950
- Police: Scotland
- Fire: Scottish
- Ambulance: Scottish
- UK Parliament: Orkney and Shetland
- Scottish Parliament: Shetland

Levenwick is a small village about 17 miles (27 km) south of Lerwick, on the east side of the South Mainland of Shetland, Scotland. It is part of the parish of Dunrossness and the Levenwick Health Centre provides medical support for the Dunrossness area. It contains a local hall that you can hire and a campsite. As well as a small Sandy beach where otters can often be seen.

Ian Bairnson, guitarist and saxophonist of The Alan Parsons Project was born and raised in the village.

== Fishing ==
The Annual Reports of the Fishery Board for Scotland provide an insight into fishing in Levenwick in the years before the First World War.

Fishery Statistics

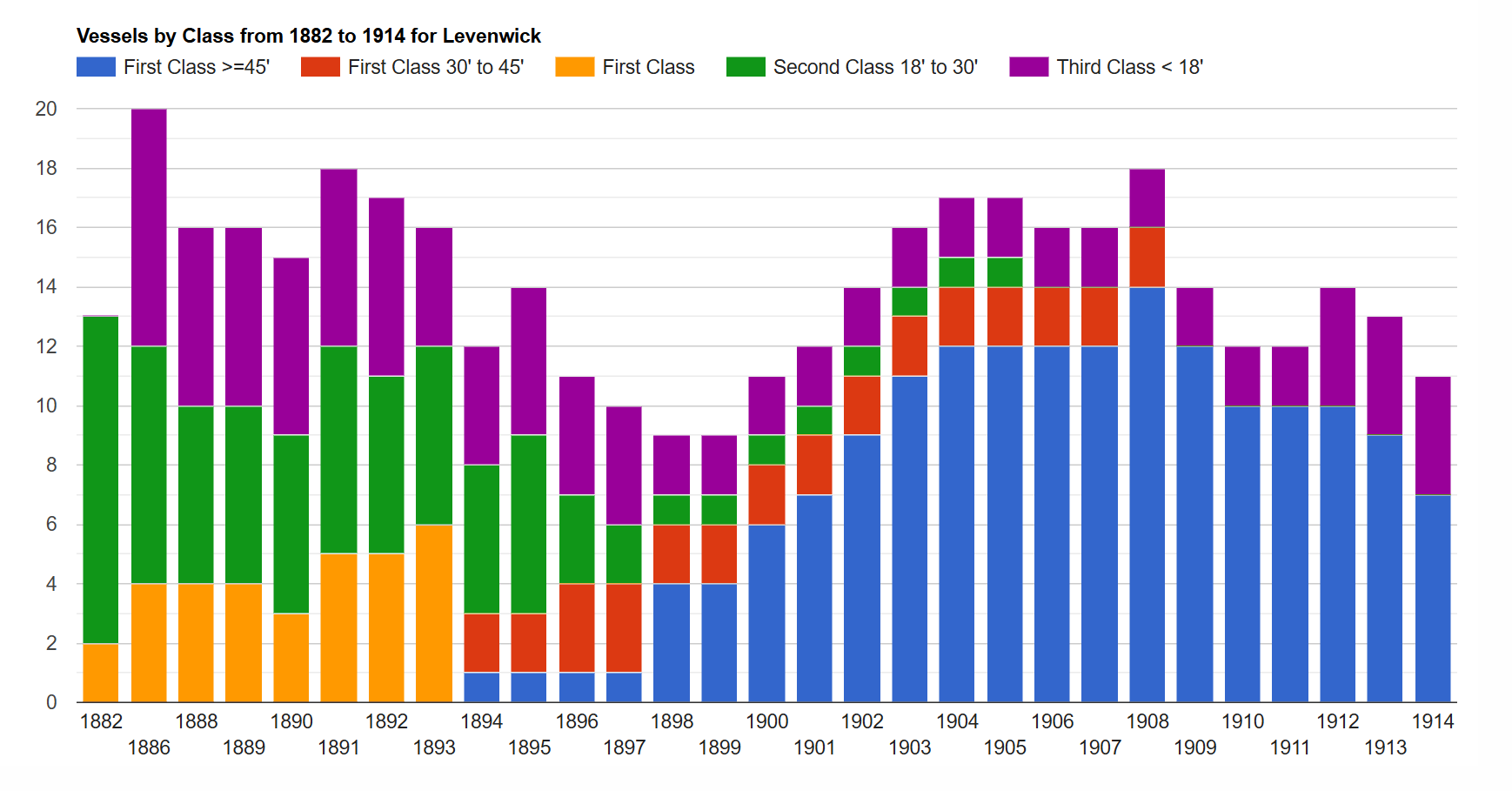
Vessels by class

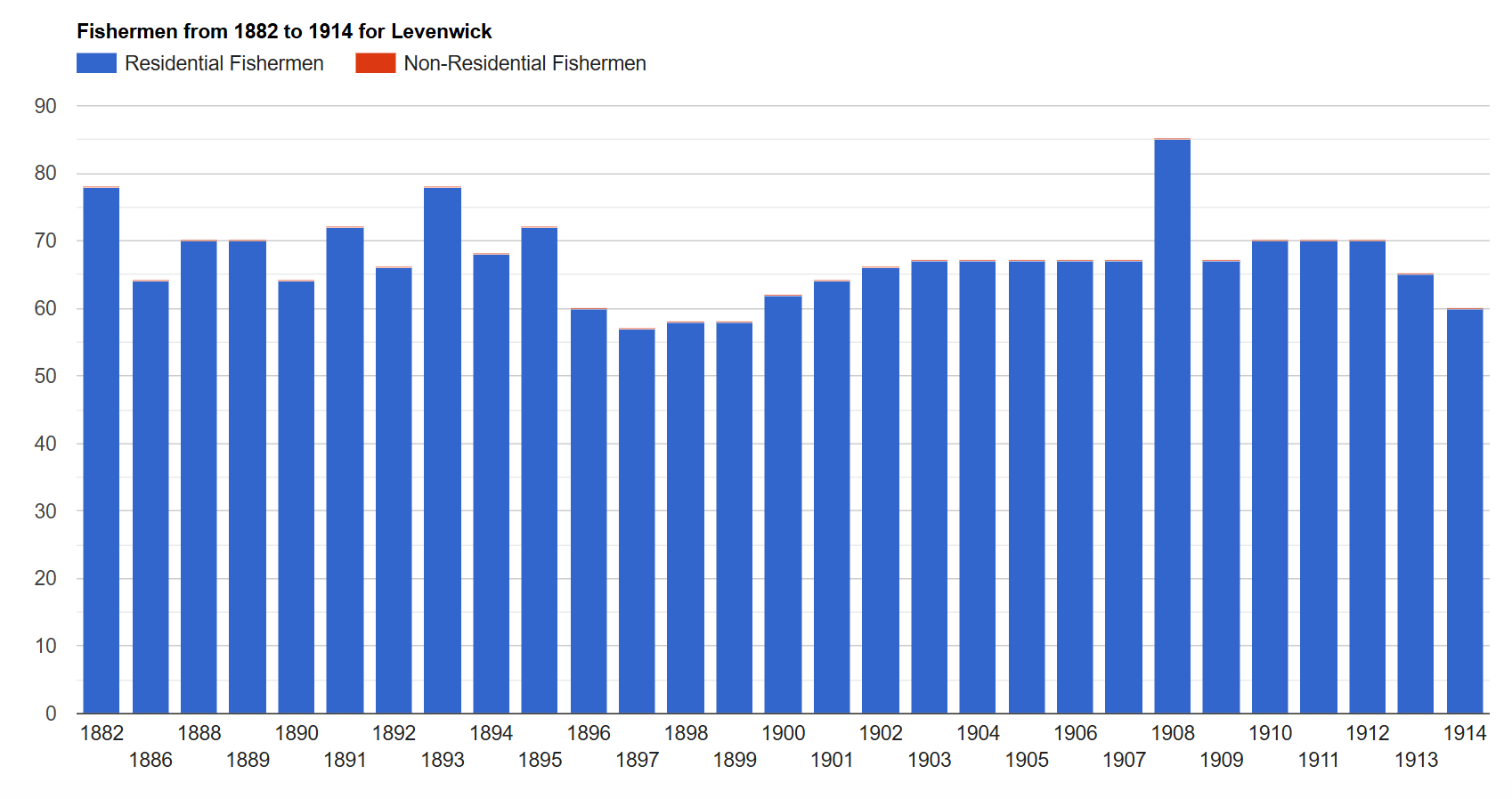
Fishermen

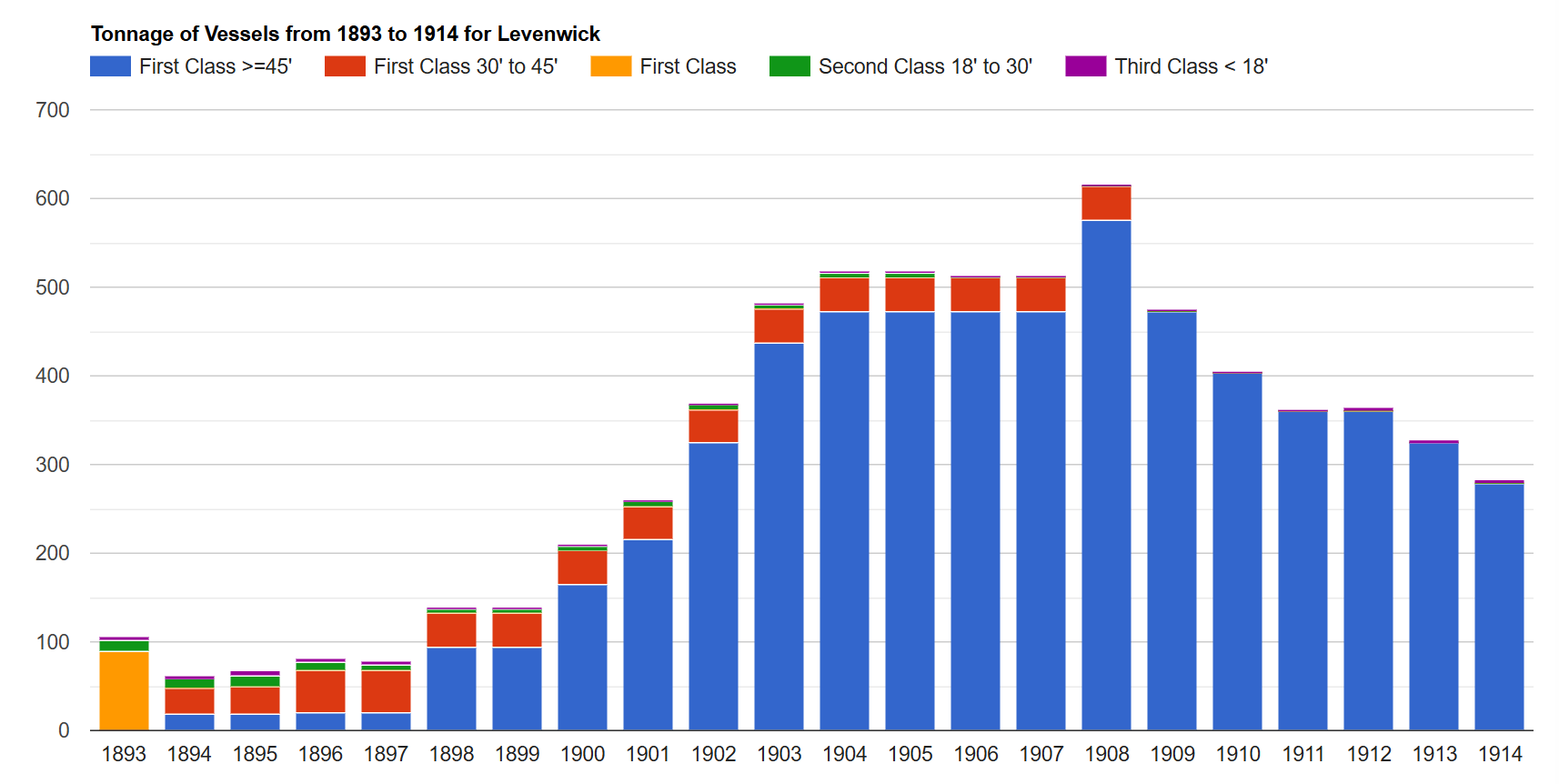
Tonnage of vessels

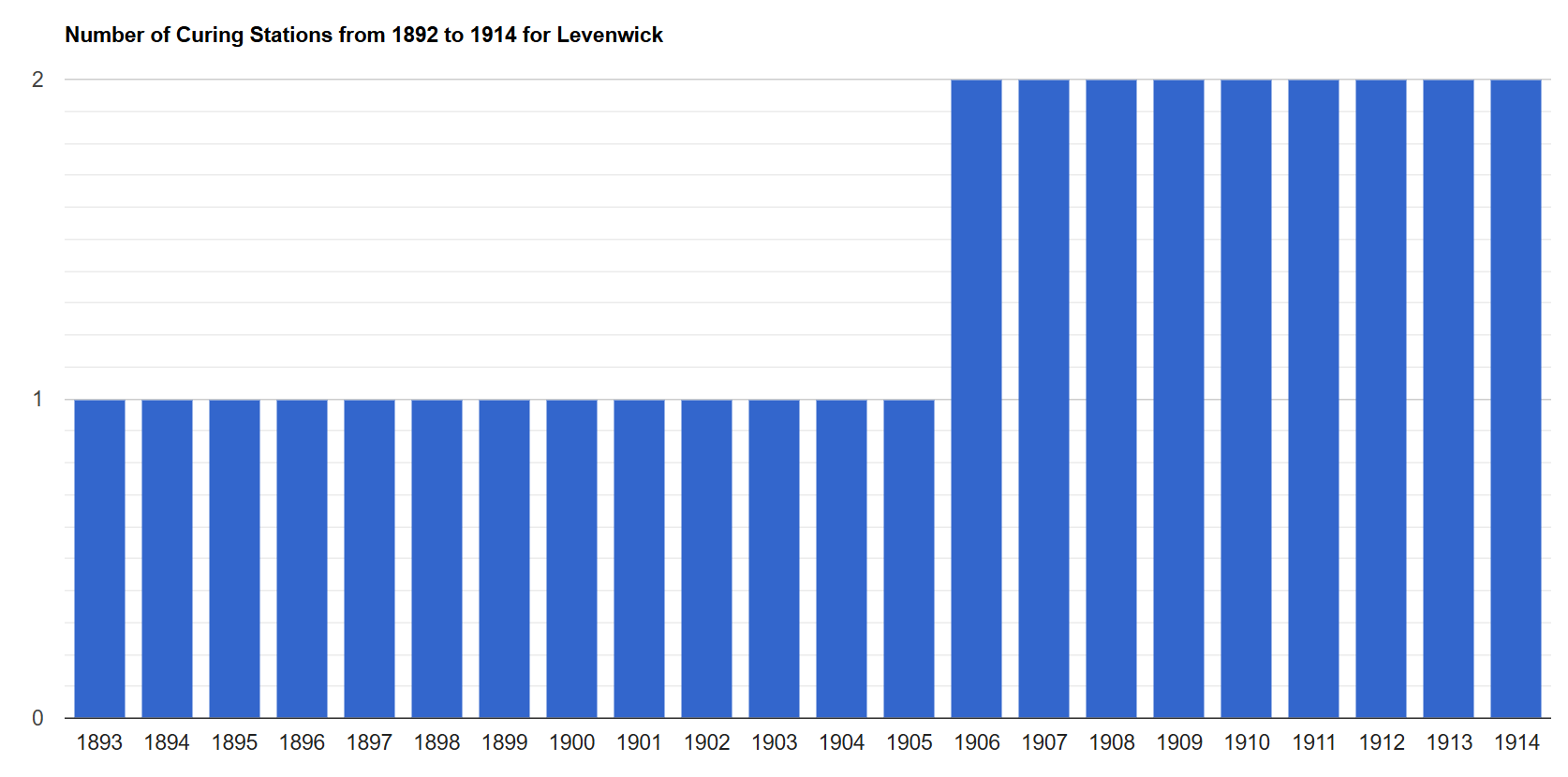
Number of curing stations

== Notable people ==
- Ian Bairnson
