= Keats (band) =

British rock band

- Origin: United Kingdom
- Genres: Progressive rock, soft rock
- Years active: 1983–1984
- Past members: Colin Blunstone; Ian Bairnson; Pete Bardens; David Paton; Stuart Elliott

Keats were a short-lived British rock band, which produced one eponymous album in 1984. The group/album was an Alan Parsons Project offshoot and was named after the Keats restaurant in Hampstead which was a favourite of Eric Woolfson. Its members were Colin Blunstone (vocals), Ian Bairnson (guitars), Pete Bardens (keyboards), David Paton (bass and backing vocals) and Stuart Elliott (drums and percussion). Richard Cottle also provided additional keyboard parts, as well as saxophone and synthesizers.

== Band members ==
=== Official lineup ===
- Colin Blunstone – lead vocals (1983–1984)
- Ian Bairnson – guitar (1983–1984; died 2023)
- David Paton – bass, backing vocals (1983–1984)
- Pete Bardens – keyboards (1983–1984; died 2002)
- Stuart Elliott – drums, percussion (1983–1984)

=== Session musicians ===
Richard Cottle – keyboards, saxophone, synthesizers (1983–1984)

== Discography ==
Keats

Studio album by Keats
- Released: 1984
- Recorded: December 1983–March 1984
- Genre: Rock
- Length: 60:13
- Producer: Alan Parsons

=== Keats (1984) ===
1996 US CD Track listing

No.	Title	Writer(s)	Length
1.	"Heaven Knows"	Pete Bardens	3:56
2.	"Tragedy"	Colin Blunstone, Stuart Elliott	5:01
3.	"Fight to Win"	Pete Bardens	4:10
4.	"Walking on Ice"	David Paton	3:31
5.	"How Can You Walk Away"	David Paton	3:41
6.	"Turn Your Heart Around"	Pete Bardens	3:44
7.	"Avalanche"	Pete Bardens	4:06
8.	"Give It Up"	Ian Bairnson	4:45
9.	"Ask No Questions"	Ian Bairnson	3:25
10.	"Night Full of Voices"	Colin Blunstone, Stuart Elliott	3:57
11.	"Hollywood Heart"	Ian Bairnson	3:43
12.	"Interview with Alan Parsons and Ian Bairnson"		16:09

=== Personnel ===
- James Marsh – Illustrator
