= Are You Ready (Bucks Fizz album) =

Studio album by Bucks Fizz
- Released: 26 April 1982
- Recorded: 1981–82
- Genre: Pop
- Length: 41:06
- Label: RCA
- Producer: Andy Hill

Bucks Fizz chronology
Bucks Fizz (1981)	Are You Ready (1982)	Hand Cut (1983)

Singles from Are You Ready
- 1. "Another Night" Released: 1981 (Japan only); 2. "The Land of Make Believe" Released: November 1981; 3. "My Camera Never Lies" Released: March 1982; 4. "Now Those Days Are Gone" Released: June 1982; 5. "Are You Ready" Released: June 1982 (not UK); 6. "Easy Love" Released: June 1982 (not UK)

Are You Ready is the second studio album by the British pop group Bucks Fizz. It was released on 26 April 1982 on RCA Records. The album was produced by their main composer Andy Hill, with other writers including Pete Sinfield and Nicola Martin, their manager. Included on the album are the UK No. 1 singles "The Land of Make Believe" and "My Camera Never Lies" as well as the follow-up "Now Those Days Are Gone". It was the group's most successful album, peaking within the UK top 10 and remaining on the chart for 23 weeks, eventually going gold.

Are You Ready received almost universally positive reviews, with Smash Hits magazine awarding it a 10 out of 10 rating. A number of reviewers rate it as their best album, as do members of the group. It went on to be re-released on compact disc three times between 2000 and 2015.

== Overview ==
=== Background ===
By the end of 1981, Bucks Fizz had proved that they were not destined to be another one-off Eurovision act by reaching the UK Top 20 with their first three singles and their debut album. In November, the group released the first single from their forthcoming second album. "The Land of Make Believe" became a big hit over Christmas 1981 and in the early weeks of January made number one in the UK Charts. The record eventually outsold "Making Your Mind Up" to become their biggest selling single in the UK.

Buoyed by this success, the group concentrated on recording the second album. A second single was released in March 1982, entitled "My Camera Never Lies". Well regarded in the press for its production values and intricate vocals, the song also made number one in the UK Charts. This became the peak of the group's career, bolstered by an award for best group at the Daily Mirror Rock and Pop Awards and a nomination at the Brit Awards.

The album was recorded during late 1981 and early 1982 at Mayfair Studios in London. Like the previous album, Are You Ready was produced by Andy Hill, who complimented the group on their ability to effortlessly adapt to the intricate harmonies and overlaying vocals on many of the tracks. For the cover of the album, the group employed a parachuting theme. The front depicts them wearing parachuting gear in an aeroplane; the gatefold sleeve opens out to show them flying through the air, while the back reveals a silhouette of them having landed. This was the idea of the art director, but the group themselves told him that they thought it was "very naff".

=== Chart performance ===
Are You Ready was released at the end of April and entered the UK charts at No.11 on 8 May 1982. The following week it rose to No.10, making it their first (and only) top ten album. After dropping down the chart it later rose up again as far as No.11 on the back of the third single. It remained on the chart for 23 weeks and was No.61 in the end of year album chart. It was certified gold by the BPI on 17 May for sales of over 100,000. Outside of the UK, the album reached No.18 in New Zealand, No.25 in Netherlands and No.61 in Germany. It remains Bucks Fizz's most successful album and was met by positive reviews.

A third single, "Now Those Days Are Gone" was released from the album a month later. Seen as something of a departure for the group, it was largely an a cappella ballad and also became successful in the UK Charts when it duly made the top 10. No further singles were issued from the album after this, although some European countries released album tracks "Easy Love" (Nº 11 in Denmark) and "Are You Ready" as singles – the latter also being released in Australia. In Japan the track "Another Night" was issued following its receiving a Best Song award in the World Popular Song Festival, held in Tokyo. The group also recorded many of the songs from this album in Spanish for the Latin American market and released an album, El Mundo de Ilusion later in the year.

The album was re-issued three times. The first time in 2000, again in 2004, and in a 2-CD edition in 2015, all times with bonus tracks. In 2006, a demo of track "Breaking and Entering" and alternate versions of "My Camera Never Lies", "Now Those Days Are Gone" and "Easy Love" were released on The Lost Masters compilation. Two years later saw a follow-up, which featured an alternate recording of "Another Night" and remixes of "Easy Love" and "The Land of Make Believe".

=== Critical reception ===
Professional ratings
Review scores
Source	Rating
Q	2/5 stars
Record Mirror	4/5 stars
Smash Hits	5/5 stars

Although Bucks Fizz generally faced harsh criticism in the press for being a lightweight pop act, their albums usually met with favourable response. Are You Ready in particular received some of their best ever reviews.

Smash Hits gave the album a rare 10 out of 10 rating, saying that "[The hits] are overshadowed by the new material which demonstrates surprising versatility. "Are You Ready" and "Twentieth Century Hero" are obvious future hits, although one of the ballads "Now Those Days Are Gone" could easily combine a new credibility with chart success. Almost the perfect pop album". Album track "Twentieth Century Hero" was listed by another staff writer as the best song of the month. Record Mirror's Daniella Soave, who had reviewed their debut album less than favourably said that this was a big improvement. She complimented both the group on outstanding vocal performances and Andy Hill for production values. Both "Love Dies Hard" and "Now Those Days Are Gone" got favourable mentions, while "Easy Love" was "a surprise" and "Breaking and Entering was "tremendous and inventive". Reviewing the album in The Daily Express, writer David Wigg said "[Producer] Andy Hill can take a common everyday phrase and turn it into an infectious tune, dressed up with breathy harmonies and expansive production. The driving "Another Night" or "Are You Ready" are perfect examples of this technique. Nothing is spared to give the production zest". Continuing to give most credit to Hill, The Sunday Times said "Andy Hill's catchy arrangements and slick production have produced a very fine album...[Aside from the singles] there are quite a few more excellent tracks, especially "Another Night" and "20th Century Hero", while "Now Those Days Are Gone" suggests that the group's vocal talent is a lot stronger than many of us imagined". Ireland's RTÉ Guide said of the album; "Some [songs] would never survive as singles but one or two are pretty excellent tracks – "Twentieth Century Hero" is a case in point" and summed the album up as "Good, straightforward pop music". In the US and Canada, eight tracks from this album were issued on their debut self-titled album in September 1982, including the single "The Land of Make Believe". The Montreal Gazette praised the album highly in a review titled "Bucks Fizz album gets top marks", commending the group on their vocal abilities and calling it "high grade British pop".

On the 2000 re-release Q stated that the album was "harmless fluff" and gave the album a 2 out of 5 rating, but singled out "The Land of Make Believe" as being "not half bad". "The Land of Make Believe" itself was later credited in Number One as "sheer genius". In 2017, Classic Pop said that Are You Ready was the group's best album, saying that it was "a giant leap in sonic sophistication", calling "My Camera Never Lies", "Easy Love" and "Breaking and Entering" "excellent".

Members Cheryl Baker and Bobby G both rate "The Land of Make Believe" as the best of their own songs. While future members Shelley Preston and Heidi Manton both list album track "Love Dies Hard" as their favourite Bucks Fizz song, and is also mentioned by Jay Aston along with "Easy Love" as among her favourites. More recently, Baker has stated that track "Breaking and Entering" is one of her favourite Bucks Fizz songs. Baker has also stated that Are You Ready is their best album.

== Track listing ==
=== 1982 vinyl release ===
All songs produced by Andy Hill.

Side One
No.	Title	Writer(s)	Length
1.	"My Camera Never Lies"	Andy Hill, Nichola Martin	4:02
2.	"Easy Love"	Hill, Martin	5:03
3.	"Love Dies Hard"	Pete Willsher, Daisy Parks	5:00
4.	"One Way Love"	Hill, Pete Sinfield	4:46
5.	"Are You Ready"	Hill, Martin, Bucks Fizz	3:50

Side Two
No.	Title	Writer(s)	Length
1.	"Breaking and Entering"	Hill, Sinfield	3:35
2.	"Now Those Days Are Gone"	Hill, Martin	3:33
3.	"Twentieth Century Hero"	Hill, Sinfield	3:50
4.	"Another Night"	Hill, Martin	3:38
5.	"The Land of Make Believe"	Hill, Sinfield	3:50

=== 2000 CD re-issue ===
Bonus Tracks
No.	Title	Writer(s)	Producer(s)	Length
11.	"Now You're Gone"	Hill, Martin	Hill	3:36
12.	"What Am I Gonna Do"	Daisy Parks, Bill Edwards	Andy Hill	3:55
13.	"What's Love Got to Do with It"	Graham Lyle, Terry Britten	Christopher Neil	3:37
14.	"When We Were Young" (Extended Club Mix)	Warren Bacall	Brian Tench, Hill	6:25
15.	"Rules of the Game" (12" Extended Mix)	Bacall	Tench, Hill	5:41

=== 2004 CD re-issue ===
Bonus Tracks
No.	Title	Writer(s)	Producer(s)	Length
11.	"Now You're Gone"	Hill, Martin	Hill	3:36
12.	"What Am I Gonna Do"	Daisy Parks, Bill Edwards	Andy Hill	3:55
13.	"My Camera Never Lies (12" Extended Mix)"	Hill, Martin	Hill	5:00
14.	"Takin' Me Higher"	Bucks Fizz	Bucks Fizz	3:40
15.	"One Touch (Don't Mean Devotion)"	Hill	Tench	5:06
16.	"Censored"	Hill, Martin	Tench	5:01
17.	"Twentieth Century Hero" (Live recording)	Hill, Sinfield		3:20
18.	"Don't Pay the Ferryman" (Live recording)	Chris De Burgh		3:56

== Personnel ==
- Bobby G – lead vocals on "Love Dies Hard"
- Jay Aston – lead vocals on "Easy Love"
- Mike Nolan – lead vocals on "Now Those Days Are Gone"
- Cheryl Baker – lead vocals on "Now You're Gone"

Musicians

- Andy Hill – Producer, Keyboards, Guitar, Backing vocals
- Graham Broad – Drums, Percussion
- Ian Bairnson – Electric Guitars
- Pete Willsher – Steel Guitar
- Nick Ingman – String arrangements
- Bruce Baxter – Brass arrangements
- Nichola Martin – Backing vocals

Production

- Recorded at Mayfair Studios
- Mixed at Mayfair Studios and Marcus Studios
- John Hudson, Brad Davis, Brian Tench, Bobby Parr – Engineers
- Dean Murphy – Executive Producer of 2004 CD re-issue
- Christopher Neil – Producer of "What's Love Got to Do With It" (bonus track)
- Bucks Fizz – Producer of "Takin' Me Higher" (bonus track)
- Brian Tench – Producer of "One Touch (Don't Mean Devotion)" and "Censored" (bonus tracks)
- Live tracks recorded at the Apollo Theatre, Glasgow, 4 March 1983

== Charts ==
Weekly chart performance for Are You Ready
Chart (1982)	Peak position
Australian Albums (Kent Music Report)	30
German Albums (GfK)	61
New Zealand Albums (RMNZ)	18
UK Albums (OCC)	10
