= Uwe Buschkötter =

German composer and music publisher

Uwe Buschkötter (born 21 September 1939) is a German composer, music publisher, and owner of various companies, such as UBM Records, UBM Media, Largo Records, (Note: The company expired in 2005.) and the company Klangvision.

== Musical career ==
After doing a commercial apprenticeship followed by studies in music & business administration, Buschkötter first worked as a music producer and publisher. He began his percussionist career in the early 1960s in Cologne, founding, in 1964, the "Buschkötter Players" who played for numerous studio productions of Roy Black, Chris Roberts, and soloists from the music productions of Hans Bertram.

In 1968, he became a producer for West German Radio (WDR) where he produced a CD with the multi Grammy award-winner and jazz pianist Bill Evans from New York, among other projects.

In 1969, he took over the management of the Kurt Edelhagen Big Band in Cologne. In 1972, he and Kurt Edelhagen produced the music for the opening ceremony of the XX Olympic Games in Munich.

In 1974, he was nominated for membership of the prestigious Art Directors Club (ADC) of Germany owing to his artistic achievements in the field of advertising music. Buschkötter composed the jingles "Maggi – Immer eine gute Suppe" ("Maggi – always a good soup") and "Die Sinalco schmeckt, die Sinalco schmeckt" ("Sinalco tastes delicious").

As well as jingles, he has also received music commissions from radio and television companies such as ARD and ZDF since 1980. His arrangement of the trio from the Scherzo of Beethoven's "Hammerklavier" Sonata for the political program "Bonn direkt" was used by the ZDF channel from 1989 to 1999 and is particularly well known, as is his signature tune to the joint morning program of channels ARD and ZDF which was used from 1992 to 2001.

In the following years, Buschkötter concentrated on the production of records and CDs. He received the German Schallplattenkritik prize twice for his recordings of works by composer Berthold Goldschmidt performed by the Mandelring Quartet: "Letzte Kapitel" ("Final Chapters") and "Früher und Später" ("Earlier and Later").

His classic labels "LARGO" (the company expired in 2005) and "Klangvision" have published recordings by soloists of the Berlin Philharmonic Orchestra, the Ensemble Modern (Frankfurt), whereby he collaborated with composers Berthold Goldschmidt, Igor Markevitch, and others.

He founded the label "Klangvision" in 2010. In 1968, Buschkötter founded the music publisher UBM. As publisher and owner, he also established a new UBM Records website with an innovative search machine in 2011. In doing so he created a new database in the context of the "music production library", which makes it possible to discover and use functional music for all kinds of music scores in the Movie and television sector.

Buschkötter has not only produced for UBM Records but also created music himself, particularly for television. In doing so he has worked with German composers such as Anselm Kreuzer, Sebastian Halbe, Reinhard Schaub, Daniel Backes, Peter Moslener, and Chris Walden as well as with the "Klangraum" music production studio.

Other outstanding musical projects have included the CD production Midnight (2015) with Till Brönner, the American tenor saxophonist Michael Brecker, pianist George Whitty, E-bass player Anthony Jackson, guitarist Dean Brown, and American percussionist Dennis Chambers.

Buschkötter emigrated temporarily to the USA between 2018 and 2020, where he once again worked intensively on music productions for Movie and television. Now back in Germany, he works and lives in Berlin.

== Awards ==
Prize of the Deutsche Schallplattenkritik for the Largo Records productions Letzte Kapitel (Final Chapters) and Früher und Später (Earlier and Later) with London-based emigre composer Berthold Goldschmidt.

== Discography (selection) ==
=== Largo Records releases ===
==== Albums/singles ====
- 1963: Guantanamera; Polydor/ Single, (Uwe Buschkötter Quintett/ Buschkötter Players)
- 1964: If I Were a Rich Bossa Nova Man; Gema/Decca /Single, (Uwe Buschkötter Quintett/ Buschkötter Players)
- 1983: Computer Energy (Uwe Buschkötter Studio Orchestra)
- 1984: Toccata – Music for two Guitars (with Gerard Ambition, Jürgen Schöllmann)
- 1987: Italian Sonatas (with Jürgen Schöllmann)

==== CDs ====
- 1986: Romantic Flute (with Schubert, Rietz, Bruno Meier, Roger Brügger)
- 1990: Berlin im Licht (with Aufnahmen von Kurt Weill, Ensemble Modern, Rosemary Hardy, HK Gruber)
- 1990: Berlin Lit Up (with Kurt Weill, Ensemble Modern, Rosemary Hardy, HK Gruber)
- 1990: Universal Ensemble Berlin (with Karl Heinz Wahren, Gerald Hummel, Wilhelm Dieter Siebert, Rainer Rubbert)
- 1993: Aus Schatten Duft gewebt (with HK Gruber)
- 1995: Früher und Später (with Berthold Goldschmidt, Mandelring Quartett, Ob Hausmann, Kolja Lessing)
- 1997: Six of Hearts (with Tom Philips)
- 1997: Red Icon (with Andrew Toovey)
- 1997: Juniper Tree (with Andrew Toovey)
- 1997: The Compilation 1 (with Kurt Weill, Berthold Goldschmidt)
- 1998: Four Walls (with John Cage, John McAlpine, Beth Griffith)
- 1998: Resorts and Summit Meetings (with Boris Blacher, London Philharmonic Orchestra, Rundfunk-Sinfonieorchester Berlin)
- 1998: Signals (with York Höller, John Wallace, London Sinfonietta, Hans Zender, Ravinia Trio, Chen Pi-hsien, Cologne Radio Symphony Orchestra)
- 1999: Letzte Kapitel (with Berthold Goldschmidt, Mandelring Quartett)
- 2004: The Plaza (with Studiomusikern, New York)
- 2007: Lyrically (with Alan Bergman and Marilyn Bergman; lyricist of Barbra Streisand, Frank Sinatra, Harry Belafonte, known for her collaboration with Dave Grusin and Michel Legrand with "The Windmills of Your Mind")
- 2007: Golden Valley Quartett
- 2008: Mass for Six Solo Voices/ Second Symphony (with Jonathan Lloyd, SWF-Sinfonieorchester Baden-Baden, Lothar Zagrosek, London Sinfonietta Voices)

=== UBM Records ===
- 2005: Volkslieder (Eric Becht and Thomas Ken-Niklaus)
- 2005: Happiness und Musik der Landsknechte (Botho Lucas Chor)
- 2005: Prelude (Wieland Reissmann)
- 2005: Dark Temper & Modern Grooves (Hosenfeld & Denis)
- 2005: City Dreams (Ralv Gielen)
- 2006: Drones and Emotions (Ralv Gielen)
- 2006: Dynamic, Tragic, Destiny, Der Neandertaler, Stories, Suspense, Mind Games, Investigate Crime Discovery Journalism (Klangraum)
- 2006: 4pm New York (Georg White)
- 2006: Pimp your picture, Positivity, Joyride, Science in Motion (Backes & Moslener)
- 2006: Mediterranean Songs (Hosenfeld & Denis)
- 2006: Night Vision (Davemann)
- 2006: Funky Fashion and Guitar Scapes (Mystery House)
- 2007: Crazy Kids, Mellow Moods, Underworld (Backes & Moslener)
- 2007: Nanostructures (Arne Schumann and Josef Bach)
- 2007: German Castle Magic (Ingo Hampf)
- 2007: Openers and Trailers (Tom Leonhardt)
- 2007: Funky Chillin Diamonds (Gillian Gordon)
- 2007: Call TV (Electronical Orchestral Tension)
- 2009: Criminal Ambitions
- 2009: Minimal Piano
- 2009: Scripted Reality & True Drama
- 2009: Science Basics (Backes & Moslener)
- 2009: Movie Tools (Backes and Ellenberg)
- 2009: Ice World, Love for Life (Anselm Kreuzer)
- 2009: Guitar Emotions (Anselm Kreuzer & Markus Segschneider)
- 2009: Light Zones (Matthew Corbett & Mike Wilkie)
- 2009: The Plaza (Marco Ribaldi)
- 2009: Quiet World (Charles Olins)
- 2009: Call TV Reloaded (Munich Sound)
- 2009: Angst (Pernilla Oesterberg)
- 2009: Ethno World, Weather & Preview, Lifestyle Grooves and Moods, New and Business (Christoph Lienemann)
- 2009: Style and Design (Wegener & Hohnholz)
- 2010: Horror Bad Tension, Docutainment, Modern Power (Sid Sonic and Ryan Gold)
- 2010: Whats up, Nature, Madworld (Christoph Lienemann)
- 2010: Increased pressure (Matthew Corbett & Mike Wilkie)
- 2010: Water World (Ansdelm Kreuzer & Markus Segschneider)
- 2010: Bizarre Underscore (Anselm Kreuzer)
- 2010: TV-Tools
- 2010: Menace of War
- 2010: TV-Tension
- 2010: Darkside (Backes & Moslener)
- 2010: Space (Achim Zwechper)
- 2010: Red Neck Rock (Steve Mushrush)
- 2010: Caribbean Sunrise (Gary Gibson)
- 2011: Greece (Stefan Heinz & Heiko Streicher)
- 2011: Ambient Guitar
- 2011: Electromotions – Chemical
- 2011: Time Tools (Backes & Moslener)
- 2011: Nuclear Danger (Anselm Kreuzer)
- 2011: Science Healthcare Technology (Matthew Corbett & Mike Wilkie)
- 2011: Subtext Grooves (Michael Bibo)
- 2012: Dark Tension (Felix Halbe)
- 2012: Arabic (Stefan Heinz & Heiko Streicher)
- 2012: Mystigation 1 (Anselm Kreuzer)
- 2012: Toxic Mysterious Lab – Science & Research
- 2012: Nostalgia
- 2012: All about Bass
- 2012: Drones
- 2012: New Energy (Backes & Moslener)
- 2012: Planet Earth (Jean Francois Massoni)
- 2012: Shady Deals (Carlo Inderness & Sebastian Katzer)
- 2012: Take Me Home (Felix Golt & Elias Cadre)
- 2013: Unplugged Series Vol. 1
- 2013: Cologne Voices (A Capella)
- 2013: Manipulations
- 2013: Gates
- 2013: Minimalism Blue, Minimalism, Generation Groove, TV-Tools, Toxic, Power Pop (Backes & Moslener)
- 2014: Electromotions Chemical (Anselm Kreuzer & Queens Road)
- 2014: Electronic Space and Grooves (Anselm Kreuzer & Tony Delmonte)
- 2014: Wildlife
- 2014: Longing Duo – Cello and Piano
- 2014: Time & Pulse
- 2014: Piano Memories (Backes & Moslener)
- 2014: Film, Feature and Documentary (Felix Halbe)
- 2014: TV-Tension (Axe Coon, Linus Sandberg)
- 2014: Gloomy Underscores (Marc Bradley, Steven Solveig)
- 2014: Ambient Guitar (Johannes Huppertz)
- 2014: Menace of War (Vincent Nguyen, Sebastian Parche)
- 2015: Better Be Cool (Vincent Nguyen, Rainer Peters)
- 2015: Boombox (Axel Coon, Linus Sandberg)
- 2015: Conspiracy (Felix Halbe)
- 2015: Criminal Ambitions (Rainer Quade, Sebastian Parche)
- 2015: Dreams & Fears – Organic Underscores (Queens Road)
- 2015: Electromotions – Data Transfer (Anselm Kreuzer &Queens Road)
- 2015: Fate of History (Heribert Riesenhuber, Tony Delmonte, Anselm Kreuzer)
- 2015: Heroes (Guido Jöris, Andreas Kolinski, Reinhard Schaub, Anselm Kreuzer)
- 2015: Indie Dance (Erik Stadel, Yan Vogel)
- 2015: Investigative 2 (Bernhard Hering, Matthias Krüger-Wendel)
- 2015: Minimal & Neo-Classical – Modern Chamber Ensembles (Erik Stadel, Yan Vogel)
- 2015: Minimal Piano (Maxi Menot)
- 2015: Mixed Emotions (Michi Körner, Anselm Kreuzer)
- 2015: North America – Travel and Nature (Karsten Lipp, Andre Matov)
- 2015: Showdown (Bernhard Hering)
- 2015: Tiny String Ensemble (Manuel Plötzky)
- 2015: Zoo Stories (Vincent Nguyen, Sebastian Parche)
- 2015: Scripted Reality & True Drama (Backes & Moslener)
- 2015: Modern Chamber Ensembles (Erik Stadel, Yan Vogel)
- 2015: Organic Underscores Dreams and Fears (Queen Road)
- 2015: Tiny String Ensemble (Manuel Ploetzky)
- 2016: Africa between Hope and Despair (Francisco Becker)
- 2016: Cinematic Moods & Colours (Sebastian Pecnik)
- 2016: Dolce Italia (Andrea Gattico)
- 2016: Easy Pop (Daniel Backes, Peter Moslener)
- 2016: Middle East – Between Tradition & Crisis (Francisco Becker)
- 2016: Piano Keys (Luke Davoll)
- 2016: Political Dynamics (Elias Cadre)
- 2016: Reduced Emotions (Backes & Moslener)
- 2016: Rough Pop (Backes & Moslener)

=== Advertising jingles (selection) ===
- Maggi ("Immer eine gute Suppe")
- Bionorm
- Blut Sausages
- Brummi
- Commerzbank
- Coca-Cola
- Crisan
- Don Felix
- Dor Detergent
- Eckes Edelkirsch
- Gerolsteiner Sprudel
- Mustang
- Perla Detergent
- Raider, "Der Pausensnack"
- Santosa Shampoo
- Sarotti-Schokolade
- Sinalco ("Die Sinalco schmeckt…")
- Spania Oranges
- Tchibo Kaffee
- Tyrolia
- Vernell Detergent
- Wella Cosmetics
- WDR

=== Soundtracks (selection) ===
- 1989: Theme melody for television broadcaster ZDF
- 1989: Theme song for "Bericht aus Bonn" (ARD)
- 1989: Opening melody for "Morgenmagazin" (Das Erste)
- 1989: Opening melody for "Daydream"
- 1989: Main melody for "Heute Nachrichten" (ZDF) and "Presseschau" (ZDF)
- 1989: Theme melody for "Sport Kompakt" (ARD) and "Richtig oder Falsch" (ARD)
- 1989: Theme melody for "Kultur Kompakt" and "Wirtschaft Kompakt" (MDR)
- 1989: Theme song for "Berlin Mitte" (ZDF)
- 1989: Theme melody für das Magazin "Maybrit Illner"
- 1989: Zwei Münchner in Hamburg (with Peter Deutsch) (verschiedene Episoden)
- 1991: TV Series "Die Welt der Jahrhundertmitte" (ZDF)
- 1991: Gekaufte Bräute (with Kathe Kratz)
- 1991: Mandelküßchen (with Bernhard Stephan)
- 1991: Tatort: Tödliche Vergangenheit
- 1992: "Bella Block" (various: 1992–1995)
- 1992: TV Series "Geschichten aus dem Leben"
- 1992: Einer zahlt immer (with Max Färberböck)
- 1992: Widerspenstige Viktoria (with Eberhard Itzenplitz)
- 1992: Schlafende Hunde – eine Frau wacht auf (with Max Färberböck)
- 1992: Verflixte Leidenschaft (with Carlo Rola)
- 1992: TV Series "Inseln unterm Wind" (ZDF)
- 1993: Geschichten aus dem Leben
- 1993: Apfel im Moor (Filmmusik, mit Marcus Scholz)
- 1993: Schulz & Schulz V – Fünf vor zwölf (with Nico Hofmann)
- 1993: Bella Block: Die Kommissarin (with Max Färberböck)
- 1993: Movie "C 14"
- 1993: Movie "Fische und Freunde"
- 1993: Movie "Kampf der Geschlechter"
- 1993: "Verführungstango"
- 1993: TV Series "Schulz & Schulz"
- 1993: TV Series "Tatort" (diverse, bis 2001)
- 1993: Main theme for German national lottery
- 1994: TV Series "Evelyn Hamann, Geschichten aus dem Leben" (ARD)
- 1994: TV Series "Ein Heim für Tiere" (ARD)
- 1994: Polizeiruf 110: Kiwi und Ratte (various)
- 1994: Polizeiruf 110: Arme Schweine (with Bernd Böhlich)
- 1994: Lutz & Hardy (TV Series)
- 1994: Der Neger Weiß (with Michael Günther)
- 1994: Dreimal die Woche (with Walter Weber)
- 1994: "Blut des Sonnengottes"
- 1994: Polizeiruf 110: Bullerjahn (with Manfred Stelzer)
- 1995: Polizeiruf 110: Im Netz
- 1995: Gabriellas Rache
- 1995: Bella Block: Liebestod (with Max Färberböck)
- 1995: Nicht über meine Leiche (with Rainer Matsutani and Walter Weber)
- 2001: Tatort: Verhängnisvolle Begierde (with Michael Lehn)
- 2002: Gott ist tot (with Kadir Soezen)
- 2003: Soundtrack for "Julie und das Monster" (Kirsten Boie)
- 2004: TV Series: Der Ferienarzt vom Gardasee – Wiedersehen am Gardasee (with Dieter Kehler)

=== Radioplay music ===
- 2006: Kirsten Boie: Juli und das Monster
