= Ian Bairnson =

Scottish musician (1953–2023)

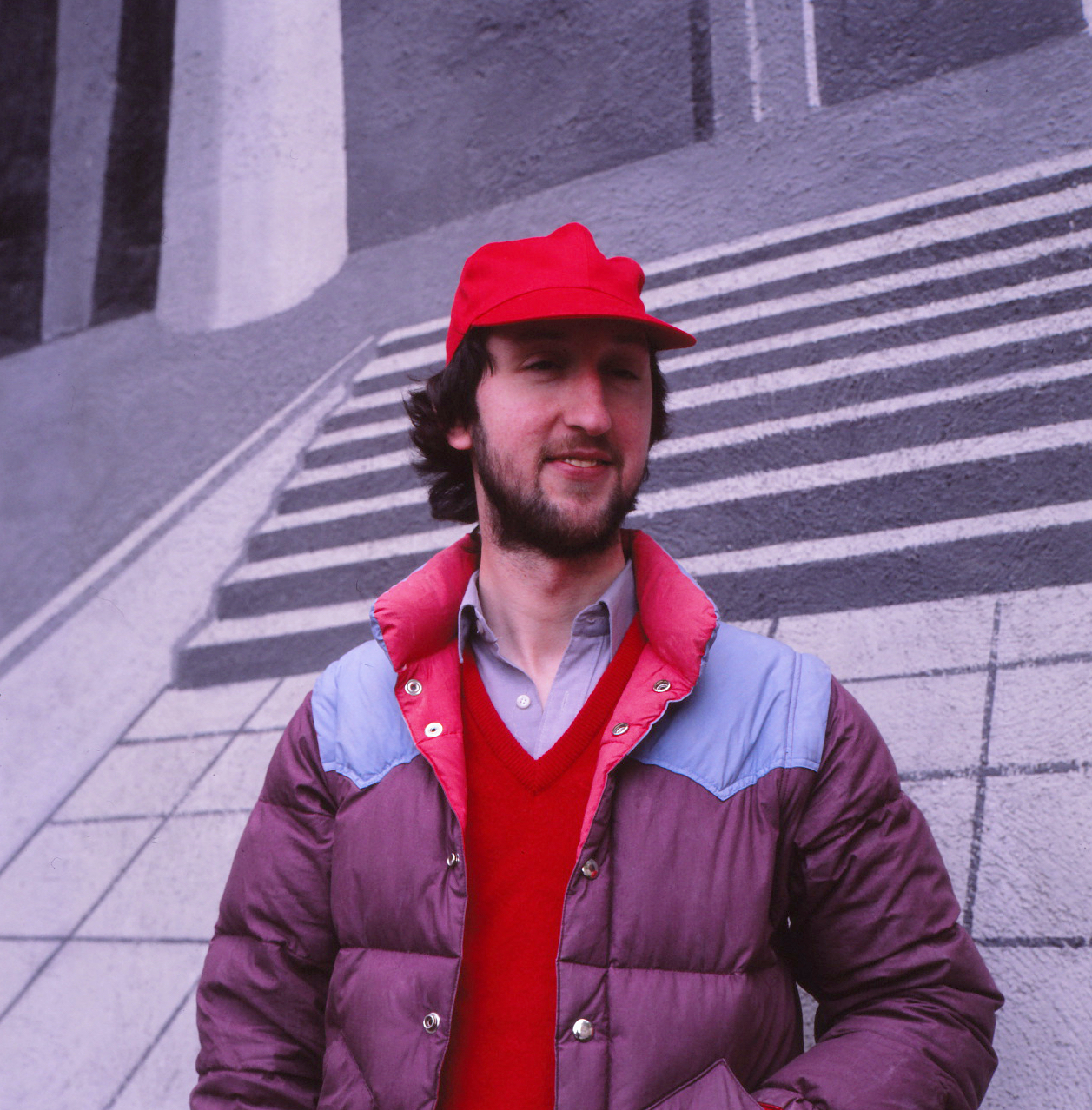
- Bairnson in 1982

Background information
- Born: John Bairnson; 3 August 1953; Lerwick, Shetland, Scotland
- Origin: Levenwick, Shetland, Scotland
- Died: 7 April 2023 (aged 69)
- Genres: Soft rock, progressive rock
- Occupation: Musician
- Instruments: Guitar, saxophone, keyboards
- Years active: 1968–2019
- Formerly of: The Alan Parsons Project; Pilot; Keats
- Website: IanBairnson.com

John Bairnson, professionally known as Ian Bairnson (3 August 1953 – 7 April 2023), was a Scottish musician and member of Pilot and the Alan Parsons Project. He was a multi-instrumentalist, who played saxophone and keyboards, but mainly performed as a guitarist, which he played with a sixpence. In addition to his work with the Alan Parsons Project, Bairnson played guitar on four Kate Bush albums, including the guitar solo on her 1978 debut single, "Wuthering Heights".

== Early life ==
Bairnson was born as John Bairnson in Lerwick, Shetland, on 3 August 1953. He grew up in Levenwick, also in Shetland, before his family moved to Edinburgh when he was nine years old, following the death of his father. Bairnson learned how to play the guitar when he was six.

== Career ==
=== Pilot and the Alan Parsons Project ===
Bairnson was a session guitarist before joining up in 1973 with former Bay City Rollers musicians David Paton and Billy Lyall in the band Pilot, contributing the harmony guitar parts to their hit single "Magic". He started using the name Ian when he joined Pilot. During this time with Pilot, he first collaborated with Alan Parsons, the record producer on their debut self-titled album. It was this relationship that helped incorporate most of the band's members (bassist/lead singer Paton and drummer Stuart Tosh) into the Alan Parsons Project. He played the distinctive guitar solo on the track "I Wouldn't Want to Be Like You" from Parsons' I Robot (1977) album.

As a guitarist, he was featured on every Alan Parsons Project album, including the 1984 side project Keats. He also remained with Parsons after the dissolution of the Project, playing guitar and saxophone in the studio and as part of the live band and also writing several songs for the albums Try Anything Once, The Very Best Live, On Air and The Time Machine.

In 2019, Bairnson added guitar solos to two songs from Alan Parsons' new album, The Secret, specifically the tracks "Years of Glory" and "I Can't Get There from Here".

=== Additional work ===
Bairnson played on Kate Bush's first four albums The Kick Inside (1978) (notably playing the guitar solo on "Wuthering Heights") Lionheart (1978), Never for Ever (1980) and The Dreaming (1982).

Bairnson also played guitar for the vocal group Bucks Fizz for whom he co-wrote two Top 20 hits, "If You Can't Stand the Heat" (1982) and "Run for Your Life" (1983).

In 2009 he appeared on the album of the German bass player Chris Postl, Parzivals Eye. Chris Postl played in RPWL, a German band. He toured with a number of different bands, the latest being Junk (Bairnson, Pau Chaffer, Sarah Rope and Ángel Celada). During his session career he played on more than a hundred albums in different styles, for artists such as Yvonne Keeley, Joe Cocker, Jon Anderson, Chris DeBurgh, Mick Fleetwood, and Neil Diamond. He played live with Sting, Eric Clapton, Beverley Craven and many more.

After moving back to the UK in 2013, Bairnson got together with David Paton and produced an album called A Pilot Project where they paid homage to Eric Woolfson’s legacy. In November 2016 Paton and Bairnson got together again, touring Japan with a Pilot revival and some Alan Parsons Project songs as well.

== Personal life and death ==
Bairnson lived in Spain from 2003 to 2013, where he had a recording studio and continued working as a session guitarist.

His wife, Leila, announced on her Facebook page in 2018 that Bairnson had been diagnosed with a progressive neurological condition that affected his communication skills, so he would no longer play in public. On her Facebook page, she subsequently announced that Bairnson had died on 7 April 2023, following a long period suffering from dementia. He was 69.

== Albums discography ==
=== With Pilot ===
- From the Album of the Same Name (1974)
- Second Flight (1975)
- Morin Heights (1976)
- Two's a Crowd (1977)
- Blue Yonder (2002)
- A Pilot Project (2014)

=== With The Alan Parsons Project ===
- Tales of Mystery and Imagination (1976)
- I Robot (1977)
- Pyramid (1978)
- Eve (1979)
- The Turn of a Friendly Card (1980)
- Eye in the Sky (1982)
- Ammonia Avenue (1984)
- Vulture Culture (1985)
- Stereotomy (1985)
- Gaudi (1987)
- Freudiana (1990)
- The Sicilian Defence (2014)

=== With Kate Bush ===
- The Kick Inside (1978)
- Lionheart (1978)
- Never for Ever (1980)
- The Dreaming (1982)

=== With Bucks Fizz ===
- Bucks Fizz (1981)
- Are You Ready (1982)
- Hand Cut (1983)
- I Hear Talk (1984)
- Writing on the Wall (1986)

=== Others ===
As a session player, Bairnson played on over 100 albums for various artists including David Courtney, Billy Lyall, Hudson Ford, Steve Harley, Rab Noakes, Chris de Burgh, John Townley, Lenny Zakatek, Eberhard Schoener, Jon Anderson, Elaine Paige, Mick Fleetwood, Bananarama, Esther Ofarim, Panarama, Akira Inoue, Rick Cua, Julia Downes, Andrew Powell, Keats, Kenny Rogers, Mari Iijima, Uwe Buschkötter, David Sylvian, Anri, James Reyne, Nobuhide Saki, Thomas Anders, Masamichi Sugi, Eric Woolfson, Yukio Sasaki, Yui Asaka, Kyoko Koizumi, Miss Thi, Chage & Aska, Marie Claire, Tom Jones, David Paton, Tam White, Marian Gold, Beverley Craven, Jim Diamond, Marajan, Alan Parsons, Mary Mac, Jargon, Manolo García, Chris Rainbow, Alfonso XII, Carola, Chris Norman, Liverpool Express, 101 South, Leslie Mándoki, and Jelone.
