= The Golden Days are Over =

1983 song by Cliff Richard

Song by Cliff Richard

from the album Silver
- Released: 3 October 1983
- Recorded: 1983
- Genre: Pop
- Length: 4:17
- Label: EMI
- Songwriters: Terry Britten, Sue Shifrin

"Golden Days"

Single by Bucks Fizz

from the album I Hear Talk
- B-side: "Where Do I Go Now"
- Released: 15 October 1984
- Genre: Pop
- Length: 4:12
- Label: RCA
- Songwriters: Terry Britten, Sue Shifrin
- Producer: Terry Britten

Bucks Fizz singles chronology
"Talking in Your Sleep" (1984)	"Golden Days" (1984)	"I Hear Talk" (1984)

"The Golden Days are Over" or "Golden Days" is a 1983 song, popularized a year later by the UK pop group Bucks Fizz. Written by Terry Britten and Sue Shifrin, it was the follow-up to their top 20 single "Talking in Your Sleep", but failed to chart as highly. A month later it was featured on the band's fourth studio album I Hear Talk. "Golden Days" was originally recorded by Cliff Richard.

== Background ==
Released in October 1984, this was the thirteenth single by the group but failed to achieve the success of the group's previous hits and stalled at No. 42 in the UK Singles Chart. With lead vocals by member Bobby G, the song tells of a fading movie star who is desperate to regain some of her former glory. The song was written by Terry Britten and Sue Shifrin and was produced by Britten – the only Bucks Fizz single not to be produced by Andy Hill. Member Mike Nolan regrets not pushing to sing lead vocals on the track, comparing it to "Now Those Days Are Gone". Reviewing the song in Smash Hits, Morrissey called it "inexcusably dim". Music magazine Number One however gave the song a glowing review, saying "the sultry lead vocal is backed by the usual perfect three-part harmonies and a chorus that you'll not be able to get rid of for days. Great stuff."

The promotional video for the song featured the group as 1920s film stars, depicting them in a black and white film as well as behind the scenes in colour. The movie star in question was played by member Cheryl Baker. The group also promoted the song on TV appearances, such as BBC's Wogan.

As well as a 7" and 12" single, "Golden Days" was also released as a limited edition 7" picture disc EP, which featured a live medley of rock tracks which the group had performed in concert. The B-side of the single, "Where Do I Go Now" was written by member Cheryl Baker in her only solo writing credit. The 12" version of the single included a bonus track, "One Touch Too Much", also featuring lead vocals by Baker. "Golden Days" was then included on the group's album I Hear Talk, released soon after the single. A new extended mix of the song was produced in 2008 and featured on the Bucks Fizz album, The Lost Masters 2 - The Final Cut.

The song was originally recorded by Cliff Richard as "The Golden Days are Over" a year previously on his album, Silver.

== Track listing ==
7" single

1. "Golden Days" (Terry Britten / Sue Shifrin) (4.12)
2. "Where Do I Go Now" (Cheryl Baker) (4.31)

12" single

1. "Golden Days" (4.12)
2. "One Touch Too Much" (Andy Hill / Sue Shifrin) (3.39)
3. "Where Do I Go Now" (4.31)

Limited edition EP

1. "Golden Days" (4.12)
2. "Where Do I Go Now" (4.31)
3. "Rock Medley (Live)" (featuring the songs: "Eye of the Tiger", "Hot Legs", "Since You Been Gone", "Heartbreaker", "Dead Ringer for Love", "Whatever You Want" (8.24)

== Chart history ==
Country	Peak position
UK	42
