= Warren Harry =

- Birth name: Warren Philip Harry
- Also known as: Warren Bacall
- Born: 16 September 1953; Aylesbury, Buckinghamshire, England
- Died: 10 March 2008 (aged 54); Cymmer, Wales
- Occupation(s): Songwriter, singer
- Years active: 1973–1986
- Labels: Sonet Records, Polydor Records, Bronze Records, Stage Coach Records, Pilot Records, Avocado Records
- Formerly of: Bucks Fizz, The Yum Yum Band

Warren Harry (born Warren Philip Harry, 16 September 1953 – 10 March 2008) (also known as Warren Bacall) was a British songwriter and performer, he was mainly known for writing hit songs for the British band "Bucks Fizz."

== Biography ==
Harry was born in Aylesbury, Buckinghamshire, England.

In the late 1970s, Warren Harry performed with his band, 'The Yum Yum Band'. Members of Harry's backing band included Graham Dibble (guitar, vocals), Michael (Paddy) Burns (drums, backing vocals), Paul Kendal (bass guitar), John Clarke (drums), John Kayne (keyboards), Pete Farley (bass), Jakko M Jakszyk (guitar) and Josh Gale (bass).

From 1976 to 1984, Warren Harry released a number of singles under both the name Warren Harry and Warren Bacall. These were: "I Don't Care" (Sonet Records 1976), "I Am A Radio" (Bronze Records 1977), "Sail On" (Bronze Records, 1977), "1965" (Ellie Jay Records, 1978), "Radio Show" (Polydor Records), 1979), "Welcome to Judy's World" (Polydor Records,1980),

As "Warren Bacall" He released these singles:

"Lions and Tigers" (Stage Coach Records, 1982), "Brief Encounter" (Pilot Records, 1984), "Crystal Tears" (Pilot Records, 1984).

In 1986, he had a single in his then new band "Strange Moves" which he started with his friend "Michelle Morrison". Their single was called "Passionate Strangers" which Warren wrote and produced. They still have an unreleased album which is most likely lost, however one unreleased song by them goes on to be published on YouTube in mid 2023.

He subsequently wrote a number of songs for other artists including several songs by Bucks Fizz (such as "When We Were Young" a UK Top 10 hit), John Otway, Anthony Newley and Japanese singer Yōko Oginome.

Other songs written for Bucks Fizz included "I'd Like to Say I Love You" (as Warren Harry) from Hand Cut, and as Warren Bacall: "Rules of the Game" and "Oh Suzanne" from Greatest Hits, "Indebted to You" and "Thief in the Night" from I Hear Talk and "In Your Eyes" from Writing on the Wall. The latter four were all co-written with Andy Hill. The majority of these songs were written about tragic female characters and were sung by the female members of the group.

Harry died from a pulmonary embolism in his home in Cymmer, Wales after having an asthma attack earlier that day on 10 March 2008, aged 54. He was living with his partner Annie Harry and her son at the time.
