= Run for Your Life (Bucks Fizz song) =

Single by Bucks Fizz

from the album Hand Cut
- B-side: "Shot Me Through the Heart"
- Released: March 1983
- Genre: Pop
- Length: 4.12
- Label: RCA
- Songwriters: Andy Hill, Ian Bairnson
- Producer: Andy Hill

Bucks Fizz singles chronology
"If You Can't Stand the Heat" (1982)	"Run for Your Life" (1983)	"When We Were Young" (1983)

"Run for Your Life" is a 1983 single by UK pop group Bucks Fizz. It was written by Andy Hill and Ian Bairnson and became the group's eighth consecutive top 20 hit in the UK. It featured on the group's third album Hand Cut.

== Overview ==
=== Song information ===
"Run for Your Life" was written by the group's regular songwriter Andy Hill and Ian Bairnson, who was a prolific session guitarist and had worked with Bucks Fizz many times. It was also produced by Hill. The song's lyrics talk about feelings of paranoia and insecurity. Lead vocals are shared by members Mike Nolan and Bobby G in the verses, while the whole group sing the bridge and chorus.

The song was the opening track on the group's third album, Hand Cut, which was released the same month. The single was released on 7" vinyl and a special 10" picture disc. The B-side was "Shot Me Through the Heart", which also featured on the Hand Cut album. Around this time, the group filmed a BBC television special, Live at Blazers, to promote the album and closed with this song. They also embarked on a UK tour, comprising 25 dates during March and April, finishing with two nights at the Dominion Theatre in London.

In 2008, a new extended version of this song was produced and included on the group's album, The Lost Masters 2 - The Final Cut.

=== Promotional video ===
The promotional video was directed by Michael Geoghegan and is set at an old manor house where an old man (presumably the caretaker) appears and then vanishes out of sight. An owl also appears throughout the video. Bucks Fizz arrive in a car (driven by Aston) and then enter the house to find it deserted. On opening a door, they find themselves in a white void, where their clothes change from everyday wear to orange and black leather outfits. During these sequences they perform the song and dance routine to the camera. They later flee the house with the suggestion it is haunted.

=== Reception ===
Critical reception for the song was, as always, mixed. NME gave the single a particularly good review, complimenting the production among other things. Record Mirror, however, said that it was not an original sound for the group and seemed to be a copy of earlier hit "My Camera Never Lies". The same magazine complimented the group the same month though when reviewing "I'm Never Giving Up" by Sweet Dreams by saying "at least Bucks Fizz now make exceedingly good music". Smash Hits criticised the song for being too cluttered.

"Run for Your Life" became a hit in the UK, entering the chart on 12 March 1983. It was the highest new entry of the week at No.31. It rose to No.21 the following week, and then to its peak of No.14 on 26 March. The song then dropped down the chart, remaining there for a total of seven weeks. It was the group's eighth consecutive top 20 hit. In Ireland, the song peaked even higher, reaching the top 10 at No.8. No chart positions for other countries are available.

== Track listing ==
7" and 10" Vinyl

1. "Run for Your Life" (4.12)
2. "Shot Me Through the Heart" (4.25)

== Chart positions ==
Country	Peak position
UK	14
Ireland	8
