= When We Were Young (Bucks Fizz song) =

Single by Bucks Fizz

from the album Greatest Hits
- B-side: "Where the Ending Starts"
- Released: 6 June 1983
- Recorded: May 1983
- Genre: Pop
- Length: 4.04
- Label: RCA
- Songwriter: Warren Bacall
- Producers: Brian Tench, Andy Hill

Bucks Fizz singles chronology
"Run for Your Life" (1983)	"When We Were Young" (1983)	"London Town" (1983)

"When We Were Young" is a 1983 single by UK pop group Bucks Fizz. The track features lead vocals by band member Jay Aston. The song became their sixth top-ten-hit in the UK and it is one of their biggest hits in Europe.

== Overview ==
=== Song information ===
The song was written by Warren Harry (under the name Warren Bacall) and was produced by Brian Tench and Andy Hill—the first time Hill had not solely produced one of the group's singles. The song's lyrics tell of a woman in old age, who laments the fact that she has lost her youth and looks.

The song was notable for its change in direction for the group. The production was heavy and the song had a more ominous tone, far removed from the group's usual pop sound. It was the first and only single to feature lead vocals by Jay Aston, the sound being notably different from her solo appearances on previous songs (e.g. "Getting Kinda Lonely" on Bucks Fizz and "Easy Love" on Are You Ready). At the time of release, Aston said: "It's a very different kind of song. It's much harder and heavier and a concerted effort from Andy and the production team. We'll probably lose a lot of our old fans with this single but I hope we'll interest lots of new people." Aston has also said that she was adopting an affected voice, similar to Hazel O'Connor, although a review at the time remarked on her simulating Lene Lovich. Aston has since stated, despite the song's success, her vocal affectation wasn't a good idea, although she has still rated it her favourite Bucks Fizz song; in contrast, Cheryl Baker has commented that she never liked the song due to its downbeat tone.

The single was released in June 1983 on 7" and 12" vinyl and also 7" and 12" picture discs. The B-side was "Where the Ending Starts" (also featuring Aston on lead), which had been recently released on the group's third album, Hand Cut. The 12" single featured an extended version of the song with a long drum-laden passage after the second chorus. Also included was a previously unreleased bonus track "When the Love Has Gone". "When We Were Young" was later featured on the group's first Greatest Hits album, released in November 1983. In 2005, it was released in a slightly edited form on the Bucks Fizz compilation, The Ultimate Anthology.

Bucks Fizz in the promotional video for "When We Were Young"

=== Music video ===
The promotional video for the song prominently featured Jay Aston singing the song to the camera on a set resembling a room in a house. Throughout the video, she is dressed in a white basque, adorned with frills and torn pieces of material. Her hair is unusually long and unkempt. At the bridge, the other members of the group appear separately facing the camera in a misty setting. After the second chorus, the group appear together, standing against a garishly-coloured chroma key background. In the distance, electricity pylons are visible. Aston, while remarking on the musical change in direction for the group, also made mention that the video took a different approach to their previous ones. The video was filmed in Germany, although is mainly studio-bound.

=== Chart performance ===
"When We Were Young" became the group's ninth consecutive top 20 hit in the UK. The single entered the chart on the 18th of June 1983, at No.23, which was the group's highest ever first-week entry into the charts, beating "Making Your Mind Up" by one place. The following week it rose to its peak position of ten, where it remained for the following week. It then fell down the chart, remaining there for eight weeks in total. The single performed particularly well in Europe also, becoming their biggest hit since "The Land of Make Believe" and the third biggest hit of the group's career. It reached the top ten in Ireland, as well top 20 placings in the Netherlands and Austria. This was to be Bucks Fizz's last UK top 10 hit for three years.

== Track listing ==
7" single

1. "When We Were Young" (Warren Bacall) (4.04)
2. "Where the Ending Starts" (Andy Hill) (3.57)

12" single

1. "When We Were Young" (extended club mix) (6.27)
2. "When the Love Has Gone" (Andy Hill / Nichola Martin) (5.50)
3. "Where the Ending Starts" (3.57)

== Chart positions ==
Country	Peak position
UK	10
Ireland	6
The Netherlands	14
Belgium	19
Germany	52
Austria	19
