= Rules of the Game (song) =

Single by Bucks Fizz

from the album Greatest Hits
- B-side: "When We Were at War"
- Released: November 1983
- Recorded: October 1983
- Genre: Pop
- Length: 4.02
- Label: RCA
- Songwriter: Warren Bacall
- Producers: Brian Tench, Andy Hill

Bucks Fizz singles chronology
"London Town" (1983)	"Rules of the Game" (1983)	"Talking in Your Sleep" (1984)

"Rules of the Game" is a 1983 single by UK pop group Bucks Fizz. It was the band's 11th single and released to coincide with their Greatest Hits album. The song featured member Cheryl Baker on lead for the first time as a single and was a frantic production-heavy pop song. It was written by Warren Bacall and produced by Brian Tench and Andy Hill. It fared poorly in the UK Charts, becoming their first single to miss the top 40.

== Overview ==
The song was written by Warren Harry (under the name Warren Bacall), who had written their top 10 hit "When We Were Young" a few months earlier. It was produced by Brian Tench with co-production by Andy Hill. "Rules of the Game" features lead vocals by member Cheryl Baker. The song's lyrics centre on a woman who becomes famous and turns her back on her old friends, but when the fame ends, she finds herself desperately lonely.

Released in November 1983, it proved to be one of the group's least successful singles, peaking at No.57. Despite this, it remained on the Top 100 Chart for 10 weeks. The record's chart failure was commented on by the group some months later, with member Jay Aston stating; "It didn't get played. It came out a bit too soon after 'London Town' and got a bit lost among the Christmas stuff". Bobby G agreed that the record company was putting out too many singles at the time, "We gave them a lot of material and record companies, being what they are, released it." Following this they decided simply to not give any of their finished material over. As a result, the next single was released some nine months later.

The single was released in tandem with their first Greatest Hits album.

The B-Side to the single, "When We Were at War", a ballad, was written by the group themselves. At 6 minutes running length, it remains the longest song recorded by Bucks Fizz.

Baker has since said of her dislike for "Rules of the Game", stating that she finds the lyrics depressing and was unhappy with the affected way she was asked to sing, although it remains a fan-favourite. The single received a negative review in Smash Hits, calling it "cluttered" and "boring", although it said it was an improvement on their previous single "London Town". The Promotional Video shows the group performing the song as moderators of a game featuring two martial arts players.

An extended 12" version of the song was produced but never released at the time. It finally surfaced on a re-release of the group's Are You Ready album in 2000.

== Track listing ==
1. "Rules of the Game" (Warren Bacall) (4.04)
2. "When We Were at War" (Bucks Fizz) (6.00)
