= Bucks Fizz (album) =

Studio album by Bucks Fizz
- Released: 27 July 1981
- Recorded: March – July 1981
- Studios: Mayfair (London), Morgan (London)
- Genre: Pop
- Length: 37:26
- Label: RCA
- Producer: Andy Hill

Bucks Fizz chronology
Bucks Fizz (1981)	Are You Ready (1982)

Singles from Bucks Fizz
- 1. "Making Your Mind Up" Released: March 1981; 2. "Piece of the Action" Released: May 1981; 3. "One of Those Nights" Released: August 1981

Professional ratings
Review scores
Source	Rating
Chart Songwords	3/5 stars
Music-News	3/5 stars
Record Mirror	3/5 stars
RTÉ Guide	5/5 stars

Bucks Fizz is the self-titled debut studio album by the British pop group Bucks Fizz. It was released in July 1981, it features their Eurovision-winning song "Making Your Mind Up" as well as the two follow-up singles "Piece of the Action" and "One of Those Nights". The album was produced by Andy Hill and released on RCA Records. Bucks Fizz has been re-released twice on CD, first in 2004 with bonus tracks and as a two-disc edition in 2015.

== Overview ==
In late 1980, songwriter Andy Hill and his partner Nichola Martin came up with a song that was to be entered into the Eurovision Song Contest. Martin quickly set about bringing a group together to perform it. In January 1981, Bucks Fizz were formed from auditionees Bobby G and Jay Aston along with the already chosen Mike Nolan and Cheryl Baker. The song "Making Your Mind Up" not only won the Contest, but went on to reach No. 1 in the UK singles chart, as well as many other countries in Europe. This launched the group on a run of success that would last for much of the decade.

In May the follow-up single, also written and produced by Hill, was released. "Piece of the Action" ensured that Bucks Fizz were not one-hit wonders, despite the reputation of the Contest, and quickly became another worldwide hit. The record company, RCA were keen to get an album out, and Bucks Fizz was released in late July 1981.

Recorded between promotional tours and a hectic schedule, the album featured ten pop tracks, most of them quite different to "Making Your Mind Up", the song that had made their name. Of the remaining nine tracks, only "The Right Situation" mirrored the Eurovision winner in terms of structure and style. Other variations were the disco-styled "Took It to the Limit" and the funk-influenced "Shine On". Ballads were present in the form of "It's Got to Be Love", "One of Those Nights" and "Getting Kinda Lonely". The album was released in a glossy gatefold sleeve, depicting head and shoulders shots of the group both inside and outside. Produced and largely written by Hill, the album also became a success when it reached the UK top 20 the following month and was certified gold. A third single was released in August, the ballad "One of Those Nights". This, like the others also reached the top 20 in the UK and secured Bucks Fizz as one of the top acts of the year.

No more singles were released from the album, although their next single "The Land of Make Believe" (released in November 1981) went to No.1 and revived the album in the early months of 1982, where it went as far as 34 in the charts and spent more weeks in the top 100 than it had originally done - eventually clocking up 28 in total. Outside of the UK, the album reached number 20 in New Zealand and number 29 in Sweden.

A year later, the group recorded the songs "It's Got to Be Love" (which was their second biggest hit in the Philippines, after "Making Your Mind Up"), "One of Those Nights", "Getting Kinda Lonely" and "Shine On" in Spanish for an album released in Latin America. Tracks "Piece of the Action" and "One of Those Nights" were included on their debut album in North America, released in 1982.

The album was re-issued on Compact disc in 2004 with bonus tracks. In 2008, demos and early versions of tracks "Piece of the Action", "One of Those Nights", "Getting Kinda Lonely" and "The Right Situation" were included on The Lost Masters 2 - The Final Cut compilation. In June 2015 the album was re-released again on CD as a two-disc edition featuring bonus tracks and their 1982 Spanish album El Mundo De Ilusion.

== Reviews and reception ==
The Bucks Fizz album received average to good reviews from magazines. Record Mirror gave the album three out of five stars and said; "I think Bucks Fizz are bunch of gutless wonders who can perhaps sing in tune but don't know the meaning of singing with emotion...[The album] is a big production job with slick session musicians, ten ready-made songs for them to warble, and yet the whole shebang still can't spark Bucks Fizz into action...Bucks Fizz could be good if they only learned to FEEL their songs", citing track "Shine On" as the only song to display any feeling. The same journalist went on to review their following album a year later saying that the songs had "a generous dash of emotion, something that was conspicuous by its absence on their debut". Short-lived music magazine Chart Songwords said in another three out of five review; "Whether they'll be in the public eye as long as Kim Wilde or Duran Duran, to name just two recently emerging stars, is difficult to decide, but on the strength of their debut LP, they have a fair chance", but also complained that some songs sounded like "sub Brotherhood of Man, or even worse - Guys 'n' Dolls". Irish magazine RTÉ Guide was more favourable by giving the album five out of five and said "Bucks Fizz is an excellent pop album. Of the seven non-single tracks, about four would easily make top-class single releases... Bucks Fizz is an instantly appealing album with some tracks registering immediately and other tracks growing on you".

At the time of release, the members of the group listed their favourite tracks on the album with Nolan favouring "Making Your Mind Up", Aston: "Piece of the Action", G: "One of Those Nights" and Baker: "Midnight Reservation". Baker herself has since stated that she didn't particularly like the tracks "One of Those Nights" and "The Right Situation", while all members (including Nolan) have been quoted as saying "Making Your Mind Up" was one of their weaker singles. While recording the album Baker said that they were aiming for various styles; "It's not 'Making Your Mind Up' mark I, II, III and IV". On its 2015 release, Music-News.com labelled tracks "One of Those Nights" and "Piece of the Action" as "classy" and mentioned that it was clear that this album was a bid to quickly steer themselves away from the Eurovision Song Contest.

In 2017, Classic Pop reviewed the album favourably saying the tracks were "great" and mentioned "the Moroder-ised 'Took It to the Limit', the Abba-esque 'Lady of the Night' and the disco-funky 'Shine On'."

== Track listing ==
=== Original album ===
#	Side One	Time
1.	"Piece of the Action"; Writers: Andy Hill; Producer: Andy Hill	3:38
2.	"Midnight Reservation"; Writers: Andy Hill, Pete Sinfield; Producers: Andy Hill	3:42
3.	"It's Got to Be Love"; Writers: Andy Hill, A. Nicholas; Producer: Andy Hill	3:05
4.	"Took It To the Limit"; Writer: Andy Hill, Nichola Martin; Producer:Andy Hill	3:48
5.	"One of Those Nights"; Writer: Steve Glen, Mike Burns, Dave Most; Producers: Andy Hill	4:26

#	Side Two	Time
6.	"Making Your Mind Up"; Writers: Andy Hill, John Danter; Producer: Andy Hill	2:38
7.	"Lady of the Night"; Writer: Nichola Martin; Producer: Andy Hill	3:38
8.	"Getting Kinda Lonely"; Writer: Mike Burns, Robert Parr; Producer: Andy Hill	5:23
9.	"Shine On"; Writers: Andy Hill, Nichola Martin; Producer: Andy Hill	3:45
10.	"The Right Situation"; Writers: Andy Hill, Pete Sinfield, Buick; Producer: Andy Hill	3:23

=== 2004 CD re-issue ===
Bonus tracks:

#	Song title and credits	Time
11.	"Don't Stop"; Writers: Andy Hill, Nichola Martin; Producer: Andy Hill	4:06
12.	"Always Thinking of You"; Writers: Andy Hill, Nichola Martin; Producers: Andy Hill	3:56
13.	"Noches Sin Ti" ("One of Those Nights" - Spanish version); Writers: Steve Glen, Mike Burns, Dave Most, Biddy & Mary McClusky; Producer: Andy Hill	4:26
14.	"Via Libre" ("One Way Love" - Spanish version); Writer: Andy Hill, Pete Sinfield, Biddy & Mary McClusky; Producer: Andy Hill	4:50
15.	"Eso Fue Ayer" ("Now Those Days Are Gone" - Spanish version); Writers: Andy Hill, Nichola Martin, Biddy & Mary McClusky; Producer: Andy Hill	3:33
16.	"Otra Noche" ("Another Night" - Spanish version); Writers: Andy Hill, Nichola Martin, Biddy & Mary McClusky; Producer: Andy Hill	3:39
17.	"El Mundo de Ilusion" ("The Land of Make Believe" - Spanish version); Writers: Andy Hill, Pete Sinfield, Biddy & Mary McClusky; Producers: Andy Hill	3:53
18.	"I Used to Love the Radio"; Writers: Andy Hill; Producer: David Motion	3:25
19.	"Love in a World Gone Mad"; Writer: Pete Sinfield, Billy Livesey; Producer: David Motion	3:58
20.	"Heart of Stone" (12" version); Writers: Andy Hill, Pete Sinfield; Producer: Andy Hill	4:29

== Personnel ==
- Bobby G - vocals, lead vocals on "One of Those Nights"
- Jay Aston - vocals, lead vocals on "Getting Kinda Lonely"
- Mike Nolan - vocals, joint lead vocals on "It's Got to Be Love"
- Cheryl Baker - vocals, joint lead vocals on "It's Got to Be Love"

Musicians

- Andy Hill - producer, keyboards, bass, acoustic guitar, backing vocals
- Graham Broad - drums
- Ian Bairnson - guitar, bass
- Mel Collins and Howie Casey - saxophones
- Nichola Martin - backing vocals
- Alan Carvell - backing vocals
- Shelley Preston - additional vocals on "Heart of Stone" (bonus track)

Production

- John Hudson and Martin Webster - engineers
- Recorded at Mayfair Studios and Morgan Studios
- Dean Murphy - executive producer of CD re-issue
- Brian Aris - photography
- Rory Kee - logo design
- Andrew Christian - art direction

== Charts ==
Weekly chart performance for Bucks Fizz
Chart (1981)	Peak position
Australian Albums (Kent Music Report)	35
New Zealand Albums (RMNZ)	20
Dutch Albums (Album Top 100)	50
Swedish Albums (Sverigetopplistan)	29
UK Albums (OCC)	14
