= If You Can't Stand the Heat (song) =

Single by Bucks Fizz

from the album Hand Cut
- B-side: "Stepping Out"
- Released: 12 November 1982
- Recorded: October 1982
- Genre: Pop
- Length: 3.35
- Label: RCA
- Songwriters: Andy Hill, Ian Bairnson
- Producer: Andy Hill

Bucks Fizz singles chronology
"Now Those Days Are Gone" (1982)	"If You Can't Stand the Heat" (1982)	"Run for Your Life" (1983)

Alternative cover

"If You Can't Stand the Heat" is a single by UK pop group Bucks Fizz. It was released in November 1982 and became the group's fifth top 10 single in the UK. The song was written by Andy Hill and guitarist Ian Bairnson. It was also produced by Hill.

== Background ==
Written by Andy Hill and Ian Bairnson and produced by Hill, the song became the group's fifth top 10 single (and seventh consecutive top 20 hit), eventually peaking at No.10 in January 1983. It was certified silver by the BPI for sales of over 250,000 in the UK.

The lyrics of the song tell of someone who is manipulative, but when faced with their own medicine, can't handle it, hence the song's title. The song was a change for the group in that it was their first single where the two female members took the lead vocals on the track - according to the group, this was done due to requests from fans. It has also been noted that the faint reggae beat on the track gives it a slight variation on the group's usually straightforward pop. The song received a positive review from Record Mirror magazine, which complimented the song's production values, calling it “Another truly staggering pseudo-dramatic epic”. It was also well received by Smash Hits which said "Bucks Fizz still know how to make really cultured pop singles" while also complimenting the production.

The promotional video depicts a day in the life of Bucks Fizz, beginning with member Jay Aston oversleeping and then joining the rest of the group for rehearsals, press interviews and culminating in a live performance. The live performance was specially shot for the video at the Shaftesbury Theatre in London, the audience being made up of fan-club members. The video also features their manager Jill Shirley, tour manager Tony McGrogan and fan-club organiser, Gay Purle.

The song featured on the group's third album, Hand Cut, released in 1983, while an extended 12" remix was released in tandem with the 7". The B-side of the single, "Stepping Out" was written and produced by the group themselves. The single came in two different picture sleeves - both with the same photographs, but with different coloured backgrounds - yellow and orange.

An alternate mix of the song appeared on the group's 2005 compilation The Ultimate Anthology.

== Track listing ==
7" Vinyl

1. "If You Can't Stand the Heat" (Andy Hill /Ian Bairnson) (3.35)
2. "Stepping Out" (Bucks Fizz) (3.28)

12" Vinyl

1. "If You Can't Stand the Heat" (extended) (5.39)
2. "Stepping Out" (3.28)

== Chart positions ==
Country	Peak position
UK	10
Ireland	10
The Netherlands	41
Germany	75
Australia	93
