= London Town (Bucks Fizz song) =

Single by Bucks Fizz

from the album Greatest Hits
- B-side: "Identity"
- Released: September 1983
- Recorded: September 1983
- Genre: Pop
- Length: 3.10
- Label: RCA
- Songwriter: Andy Hill
- Producer: Andy Hill

Bucks Fizz singles chronology
"When We Were Young" (1983)	"London Town" (1983)	"Rules of the Game" (1983)

"London Town" is a 1983 single by UK pop group Bucks Fizz. It was their first single not to reach the UK top 20, breaking a run of nine consecutive top 20 hits. The song was written and produced by Andy Hill.

== Overview ==
Released in September 1983, this was the group's tenth single. The song became their first single to peak outside the top twenty after nine consecutive top 20 hits. Eventually reaching No.34, the song remained on the chart for six weeks. It fared better in other countries however, such as Austria: No.19 and Ireland: No.24.

Written by Andy Hill, the lyrics tell of someone who is finding it difficult to adjust to life in a big city but is determined to stay. Lead vocals on the track are by member Bobby G, although he was unhappy with the way his vocals were mixed, giving them a distorted quality, claiming that he "sounded like a munchkin". This single was a short-notice replacement for another song, "Invisible", which featured lead vocals by Jay Aston, but was withdrawn for reasons which are unclear. Details of its release had already been announced to the fan club and mentioned on radio. The song was eventually released on the 12" version of "I Hear Talk" over a year later. The B-side of the single featured a track written by Bucks Fizz themselves, called "Identity". This track featured Mike Nolan on lead vocals and was produced by Bobby G. The 12" single featured an extended remix of "London Town".

The Promotional Video features the group performing the track with backing dancers in a variety of indoor locations including a Tube station. Part of the video was filmed in Holloway Sanitorium, a disused mental hospital in London. A scene featuring member Jay Aston being attacked by a man (played by her real-life brother, Lance) was cut from the finished version. The single received an unfavourable review in Smash Hits (reviewed by comedian Lenny Henry), who said that although he liked their previous singles, this was lacking a melody and was overproduced (to which the magazine added "(understatement!)"). He did however compliment the drum sound on the track. In 2015 Guardian journalist Bob Stanley commented favourably on the group in general and selecting certain songs such as this saying "dig deeper and you’ll find a minor hit from 1983, the agitated, juddering London Town".

The song featured on the group's first Greatest Hits album, released soon after. It was also released on The Ultimate Anthology (2005) with a revised ending. It has never been included on a Bucks Fizz studio album.

== Track listing ==
7" vinyl

1. "London Town" (Andy Hill) (3.10)
2. "Identity" (Bucks Fizz) (2.40)

12" vinyl

1. "London Town" (Extended Club Mix) (6.38)
2. "Identity" (2.40)
3. "Love Dies Hard" (5.01)

== Chart positions ==
Country	Peak position
UK	34
Ireland	24
Germany	66
