= My Camera Never Lies =

Single by Bucks Fizz

from the album Are You Ready
- B-side: "What Am I Gonna Do"
- Released: 12 March 1982
- Genre: Pop; dance; new wave
- Length: 3.43
- Label: RCA Records
- Songwriters: Andy Hill, Nichola Martin
- Producer: Andy Hill

Bucks Fizz singles chronology
"The Land of Make Believe" (1981)	"My Camera Never Lies" (1982)	"Now Those Days Are Gone" (1982)

"My Camera Never Lies" is a 1982 single by pop group Bucks Fizz. It became the group's second consecutive (and third overall) UK number-one in April 1982. The song was written by Andy Hill and Nichola Martin, and was featured on Bucks Fizz's second album Are You Ready.

== Overview ==
=== Background ===
"My Camera Never Lies" was written by Andy Hill and Nichola Martin and produced by Andy Hill. Hill was the group's regular songwriter and producer, while Martin had been the woman who had put the group together and occasionally co-wrote some songs. This was her only No. 1 hit, although she also co-penned the follow-up, "Now Those Days Are Gone", which was a top 10 hit. Hill recorded the male vocals first since they were more straightforward and then added in the female parts. He considered the middle section with the members repeating "my camera" at each other to be the most complex part, but commended the group for mastering this sequence without prior rehearsal. The lyrics concern a man who is following his partner around to investigate her actions. The "camera" of the title being his view of the situation.

The promotional video which accompanied the song begins with shots of the group in a white room dressed in new romantic-style clothes. The group members are seen singing the song to camera (sometimes through an Olympus 35mm lens) in a blue-tinged studio. The chorus sees them performing the song's dance routine to camera while intercut with split-screen effects of all four members. Interspersed through the video are quick snippets of the group re-enacting scenes from famous movies including Bonnie and Clyde, Gone With the Wind, The Wizard of Oz and Cleopatra.

=== Release and reception ===
"My Camera Never Lies" was released on 12 March 1982 and entered the UK Singles chart at No. 33. The following week it rose dramatically to No. 5. Two weeks later it became the third UK number one single for Bucks Fizz for a single week in April 1982, and saw the group reach the peak of their career, being the follow-up to "The Land of Make Believe", which had also reached No. 1 a few months earlier. The single was one of the group's biggest hits and after a swift fall from the top, remained on the chart for eight weeks. This was to be the group's final No. 1, but gave Bucks Fizz their third chart topper in 12 months. It was one of the top 40 selling singles of the year. It peaked at No. 2 in Ireland but fared less well in other countries.

With this song, Bucks Fizz found themselves in favour with the music press who were normally damning of 'middle-of-the-road' pop. The song is considered by the group's fans to be among their best, while member Mike Nolan considers it one of their most mature singles but perhaps was released too early in their career. The single received a positive review in NME, with Barney Hoskyns stating "[it] is a complex, almost excessive record that transcends the sphere of commercial mush into which it is born" comparing it to Heatwave, ABBA and contemporaries Dollar saying that "its almost too good to succeed". In 2015, Guardian journalist Bob Stanley commented favourably on the song calling it their "key record" albeit "relatively forgotten [for a number one single]". He also said "ushered in on aerated harmonies, it cuts to a hard, shiny acoustic guitar riff and a lyric that could be about the narcissistic dullness of having 'made it', or the paranoia of surveillance, followed by a 'camera-ra-ra-ra' wherever you go". The same publication's reviewer Tom Ewing said that "My Camera Never Lies" was "trying to cram all of new wave and new pop into a single super-compressed hybrid, halfway between Devo and Dollar". Stanley also mentioned the single's B-side "What Am I Gonna Do" commenting on it switching from pop to rock between verse and chorus saying; "Does it hang together? Incredibly, it does".

"My Camera Never Lies" featured on the group's second album, Are You Ready, released two months later. It featured a slightly longer version which extends the ending with overlaid drum sounds which then blend into the next track "Easy Love". Another extended version of the song was released on 12" single. A slight reworking with some re-recorded vocals was released on The Lost Masters album in 2006. In 2012 The Original Bucks Fizz re-recorded the song on their album Fame and Fortune? in a completely reworked slow-tempo style.

== Track listing ==
7" vinyl

1. "My Camera Never Lies" (Andy Hill / Nichola Martin) (3.43)
2. "What Am I Gonna Do" (Daisy Parks / Bill Edwards) (3.57)

12" vinyl

1. "My Camera Never Lies" (extended) (4.55)
2. "What Am I Gonna Do" (3.57)

== Chart positions ==
Chart (1982)	Peak position
Australia (Kent Music Report)	63
Belgium (Ultratop 50 Flanders)	17
Denmark (Hitlisten)	10
Germany (GfK)	31
Ireland (IRMA)	2
Israel (IBA)	6
Netherlands (Dutch Top 40)	30
Netherlands (Single Top 100)	22
UK Singles (Official Charts)	1
