= List of songs recorded written and produced by Russ Ballard =

This is a list of songs recorded written and produced by Russ Ballard.

== List of songs written and recorded by Russ Ballard ==
- The column **Song** list the song title; **bold** means released as a single.
- The column **Writer(s)** lists who wrote the song.
- The column **Time** shows its length.
- The column **Album** lists the album the song is featured on.
- The column **Producer** lists the producer of the song.
- The column **Year** lists the year in which the song was released.

Song	Writer(s)	Time	Album	Producer	Year	Other
"Danger Zone - Part I"	Russ Ballard	2:38	Russ Ballard (1974)	Russ Ballard, Dan Loggins	1974	
"Danger Zone - Part Il"	Russ Ballard	3:06	Russ Ballard (1974)	Russ Ballard, Dan Loggins	1974	
"**Fly Away**"	Russ Ballard	3:20	Russ Ballard (1974)	Russ Ballard, Dan Loggins	1974	
"I Don´t Believe In Miracles"	Russ Ballard	3:39	Russ Ballard (1974)	Russ Ballard, Dan Loggins	1974	
"Kicks"	Russ Ballard	4:15	Russ Ballard (1974)	Russ Ballard, Dan Loggins	1974	
"**Loose Women**"	Russ Ballard	2:26	Russ Ballard (1974)	Russ Ballard, Dan Loggins	1974	
"She's A Hurricane"	Russ Ballard	3:08	Russ Ballard (1974)	Russ Ballard, Dan Loggins	1974	
"Venus (Shine Your Light)"	Russ Ballard	4:41	Russ Ballard (1974)	Russ Ballard, Dan Loggins	1974	
"You Can Count On Me"	Russ Ballard	2:35	Russ Ballard (1974)	Russ Ballard, Dan Loggins	1974	
"You Can Do Voodoo"	Russ Ballard	3:32	Russ Ballard (1974)	Russ Ballard, Dan Loggins	1974	
"A Song For Gail (What Have We Got Her Into?)"	Russ Ballard	4:33	Winning	Muff Winwood	1976	
"Are You Cuckoo?"	Russ Ballard	3:19	Winning	Muff Winwood	1976	
"Fakin' Love"	Russ Ballard	3:36	Winning	Muff Winwood	1976	
"Free At Last"	Russ Ballard	3:41	Winning	Muff Winwood	1976	
"Born On Halloween"	Russ Ballard	4:10 (3:53)	Winning	Muff Winwood	1976	
"Here I Am"	Russ Ballard	3:46	Winning	Muff Winwood	1976	
"Just A Dream Away"	Russ Ballard	4:21	Winning	Muff Winwood	1976	
"**Since You Been Gone**"	Russ Ballard	2:50	Winning	Muff Winwood	1976	
"Weekend"	Russ Ballard	3:11	Winning	Muff Winwood	1976	
"Winning"	Russ Ballard	3:39	Winning	Muff Winwood	1976	
"**Some Kinda Hurricane**"	Russ Ballard	3:39	Single	Phil Wainman	1977	
"Cast The Spirit"	Russ Ballard	6:33	At The Third Stroke	Keith Olsen	1978	
"**Dancer**"	Russ Ballard	4:02	At The Third Stroke	Keith Olsen	1978	
"Expressway to Your Heart"	Russ Ballard	2:53	At The Third Stroke	Keith Olsen	1978	
"Helpless"	Russ Ballard	4:42	At The Third Stroke	Keith Olsen	1978	
"**I'm A Scorpio**"	Russ Ballard	6:19	At The Third Stroke	Keith Olsen	1978	
"Look At Her Dance"	Russ Ballard	4:07	At The Third Stroke	Keith Olsen	1978	
"My Judgement Day"	Russ Ballard	5:38	At The Third Stroke	Keith Olsen	1978	
"**Treat Her Right**"	Russ Ballard	2:59	At The Third Stroke	Keith Olsen	1978	
"What Does It Take"	Russ Ballard	4:11	At The Third Stroke	Keith Olsen	1978	
"Breakdown"	Russ Ballard	3:16	Into The Fire	Russ Ballard, John Stanley	1980	with The Barnet Dogs
"Don't Go To Soho"	Russ Ballard	4:29	Into The Fire	Russ Ballard, John Stanley	1980	with The Barnet Dogs
"Guilty"	Russ Ballard	3:30	Into The Fire	Russ Ballard, John Stanley	1980	with The Barnet Dogs
"**Here Comes The Hurt**"	Russ Ballard	3:56	Into The Fire	Russ Ballard, John Stanley	1980	with The Barnet Dogs
"**I Will Be There**"	Russ Ballard	4:22	Into The Fire	Russ Ballard, John Stanley	1980	with The Barnet Dogs
"Madman"	Russ Ballard	5:04	Into The Fire	Russ Ballard, John Stanley	1980	with The Barnet Dogs
"Rock & Roll Lover"	Russ Ballard	3:31	Into The Fire	Russ Ballard, John Stanley	1980	with The Barnet Dogs
"Strangers"	Russ Ballard	3:53	Into The Fire	Russ Ballard, John Stanley	1980	with The Barnet Dogs
"Tonight"	Russ Ballard	4:02	Into The Fire	Russ Ballard, John Stanley	1980	with The Barnet Dogs
"Where Do We Go From Here"	Russ Ballard	4:09	Into The Fire	Russ Ballard, John Stanley	1980	with The Barnet Dogs
"Ain't No Turning Back"	Russ Ballard	4:07	Barnet Dogs	Russ Ballard, John Stanley	1980	
"Bad Boy"	Russ Ballard	4:06	Barnet Dogs	Russ Ballard, John Stanley	1980	
"Beware"	Russ Ballard	5:05	Barnet Dogs	Russ Ballard, John Stanley	1980	
"Feels Like The Real Thing"	Russ Ballard	3:55	Barnet Dogs	Russ Ballard, John Stanley	1980	
"It's Too Late"	Russ Ballard	4:08	Barnet Dogs	Russ Ballard, John Stanley	1980	
"**On The Rebound**"	Russ Ballard	3:20	Barnet Dogs	Russ Ballard, John Stanley	1980	
"Rene Didn't Do It"	Russ Ballard	2:52	Barnet Dogs	Russ Ballard, John Stanley	1980	
"Riding With The Angels"	Russ Ballard	4:06	Barnet Dogs	Russ Ballard, John Stanley	1980	
"She Said Yeah"	Roddy Jackson, Don Christy	3:15	Barnet Dogs	Russ Ballard, John Stanley	1980	Originally performed by Larry Williams (1959)
"A Woman Like You"	Russ Ballard	4:24	Russ Ballard (1984)	Russ Ballard, John Stanley	1984	
"Day To Day"	Russ Ballard	3:53	Russ Ballard (1984)	Russ Ballard, John Stanley	1984	
"I Can't Hear You No More"	Russ Ballard	5:49	Russ Ballard (1984)	Russ Ballard, John Stanley	1984	
"I Can't Hear You No More" - Edit Version	Russ Ballard	4:12	Russ Ballard (1984/2012)	Russ Ballard, John Stanley	1984	
"I Can't Hear You No More" - Extended Version-	Russ Ballard	6:47	Russ Ballard (1984/2012)	Russ Ballard, John Stanley	1984	
"In The Night"	Russ Ballard	4:08	Russ Ballard (1984)	Russ Ballard, John Stanley	1984	
"Playing With Fire"	Russ Ballard	5:06	Russ Ballard (1984)	Russ Ballard, John Stanley	1984	
"The Last Time"	Russ Ballard	5:28	Russ Ballard (1984)	Russ Ballard, John Stanley	1984	
"**Two Silhouettes**"	Russ Ballard	4:18	Russ Ballard (1984)	Russ Ballard, John Stanley	1984	
"Voices"	Russ Ballard	5:33	Russ Ballard (1984)	Russ Ballard, John Stanley	1984	
"Living Without You"	Russ Ballard	4:24	Anthology - The Classics Collection (2001)	Russ Ballard, John Stanley	1984	
"Dream On"	Russ Ballard	5:01	The Fire Still Burns	Russ Ballard, John Stanley	1985	
"Hey Bernadette"	Russ Ballard	5:47	The Fire Still Burns	Russ Ballard, John Stanley	1985	
"Once A Rebel"	Russ Ballard	5:32	The Fire Still Burns	Russ Ballard, John Stanley	1985	
"Searching"	Russ Ballard	6:00	The Fire Still Burns	Russ Ballard, John Stanley	1985	
"**The Fire Still Burns**"	Russ Ballard	5:36	The Fire Still Burns	Russ Ballard, John Stanley	1985	
"The Omen"	Russ Ballard	4:29	The Fire Still Burns	Russ Ballard, John Stanley	1985	
"Time"	Russ Ballard	1:52	The Fire Still Burns	Russ Ballard, John Stanley	1985	
"Your Time Is Gonna Come"	Russ Ballard	4:39	The Fire Still Burns	Russ Ballard, John Stanley	1985	
"Hold On"	Russ Ballard	4:16	The Fire Still Burns	Russ Ballard, John Stanley	2012	
"The Fire Still Burns" - Edit Version	Russ Ballard	4:03	The Fire Still Burns	Russ Ballard, John Stanley	2012	
"The Ghost Inside"	Russ Ballard	4:58	The Fire Still Burns	Russ Ballard, John Stanley	2012	
"Barenaked"	Russ Ballard Chris Winter	4:26	The Seer	Russ Ballard, Chris Winter	1993	
"Blue For You"	Russ Ballard	4:22	The Seer	Russ Ballard, Chris Winter	1993	
"Hold On To Love"	Russ Ballard Chris Winter	4:40	The Seer	Russ Ballard, Chris Winter	1993	
"House Of Fools"	Russ Ballard	4:18	The Seer	Russ Ballard, Chris Winter	1993	
"It Takes A Man To Walk Away"	Russ Ballard Chris Winter	4:24	The Seer	Russ Ballard, Chris Winter	1993	
"King For A Day"	Russ Ballard Chris Winter	4:52	The Seer	Russ Ballard, Chris Winter	1993	
"Love Comes Tumblin"	Russ Ballard	5:01	The Seer	Russ Ballard, Chris Winter	1993	
"Only Love Can Save Me"	Russ Ballard	5:04	The Seer	Russ Ballard, Chris Winter	1993	
"Possession"	Russ Ballard	4:43	The Seer	Russ Ballard, Chris Winter	1993	
"Stay With Me Tonight"	Russ Ballard	4:50	The Seer	Russ Ballard, Chris Winter	1993	
"Vibrate"	Russ Ballard	4:32	The Seer	Russ Ballard, Chris Winter	1993	
"The Healer"	Russ Ballard Chris Winter	4:09	The Seer	Russ Ballard, Chris Winter	1993	
"These Are The Times"	Russ Ballard Chris Winter	6:14	The Seer	Russ Ballard, Chris Winter	1993	
"He Don't Love You"	Russ Ballard Andrew Murray/Christian Ballard	?	Past... Present And Future	unknown	1999	
"How Can I Tell My Heart"	Russ Ballard Andrew Murray/Christian Ballard	?	Past... Present And Future	unknown	1999	
"If I Knew Then"	Russ Ballard Chris Winter	?	Past... Present And Future	unknown	1999	
"If You'd Only Love Me"	Russ Ballard Andrew Murray/Christian Ballard	?	Past... Present And Future	unknown	1999	co-written with Christian Ballard, Andrew Murray
"I'm The One"	Russ Ballard Andrew Murray/Christian Ballard	?	Past... Present And Future	unknown	1999	
"Lost To Love"	Russ Ballard Chris Winter	?	Past... Present And Future	unknown	1999	
"My Journey's End"	Russ Ballard	?	Past... Present And Future	unknown	1999	
"Please Don't Go"	Russ Ballard Andrew Murray/Christian Ballard	?	Past... Present And Future	unknown	1999	
"Still Be Loving You"	Russ Ballard Andrew Murray/Christian Ballard	?	Past... Present And Future	unknown	1999	
"When Tomorrow Comes"	Russ Ballard	?	Past... Present And Future	unknown	1999	
"Street Dreams"	Russ Ballard Andrew Murray/Christian Ballard	?	Past... Present And Future	unknown	1999	
"Book Of Love"	Russ Ballard	5:26	Book Of Love	Russ Ballard	2006	
"Crazy World"	Russ Ballard	4:30	Book Of Love	Russ Ballard	2006	
"I'm Just Not Made For This World"	Russ Ballard	4:45	Book Of Love	Russ Ballard	2006	
"In My Darkest Hour"	Russ Ballard	4:35	Book Of Love	Russ Ballard	2006	
"In The Dark"	Russ Ballard	3:27	Book Of Love	Russ Ballard	2006	
"In To The Light"	Russ Ballard	5:51	Book Of Love	Russ Ballard	2006	
"Is There Anybody Out There"	Russ Ballard	5:06	Book Of Love	Russ Ballard	2006	
"It's My Life (Stand In My Shoes)"	Russ Ballard	2:40	Book Of Love	Russ Ballard	2006	
"Just Like Me"	Russ Ballard	4:35	Book Of Love	Russ Ballard	2006	
"Like Father Like Son"	Russ Ballard	4:12	Book Of Love	Russ Ballard	2006	
"Love Works in Strange Ways"	Russ Ballard	3:00	Book Of Love	Russ Ballard	2006	
"On To The Next"	Russ Ballard	3:27	Book Of Love	Russ Ballard	2006	
"The Road That Has No Turning"	Russ Ballard	4:27	Book Of Love	Russ Ballard	2006	
"This Is Not A Love Song"	Russ Ballard	3:56	Book Of Love	Russ Ballard	2006	
"When You Sleep"	Russ Ballard	3:09	Book Of Love	Russ Ballard	2006	
"Wonderful World"	Russ Ballard	4:56	Book Of Love	Russ Ballard	2006	
"Free From Your Hold"	Russ Ballard	?	It's Good To Be Here	Russ Ballard	2015	
"Voices (Space Guitar)"	Russ Ballard	?	It's Good To Be Here	Russ Ballard	2015	
"Where Were You"	Russ Ballard	?	It's Good To Be Here	Russ Ballard	2015	
"Colliding"	Russ Ballard	4:04	It's Good To Be Here	Russ Ballard	2015/2020	
"Kickin' The Can"	Russ Ballard	3:22	It's Good To Be Here	Russ Ballard	2015/2020	
"My Awakening"	Russ Ballard	4:05	It's Good To Be Here	Russ Ballard	2015/2020	
"Proud Man"	Russ Ballard	4:48	It's Good To Be Here	Russ Ballard	2015/2020	
"The First Man That Ever Danced"	Russ Ballard	3:19	It's Good To Be Here	Russ Ballard	2015/2020	
"Time Machine"	Russ Ballard	3:52	It's Good To Be Here	Russ Ballard	2015/2020	
"Annabel's Place"	Russ Ballard	3:40	It's Good To Be Here	Russ Ballard	2020	
"Wasted (The Last Ride)"	Russ Ballard	4:07	It's Good To Be Here	Christian Ballard	2020	
"Tidal Wave"	Russ Ballard	3:26	It's Good To Be Here	Russ Ballard	2020	
"The Misunderstood"	Russ Ballard	4:39	It's Good To Be Here	Russ Ballard	2020	
"Since You Been Gone" (2020)	Russ Ballard	4:34	It's Good To Be Here	Russ Ballard	2020	
"You Can Do Magic"	Russ Ballard	4:05	It's Good To Be Here	Russ Ballard	2020	
"New York Groove"	Russ Ballard	3:43	It's Good To Be Here	Russ Ballard	2020	
"So You Win Again"	Russ Ballard	?	Book Of Love Tour Live 2007	unknown	2020	
"I Know There's Something Going On"	Russ Ballard	?	Book Of Love Tour Live 2007	unknown	2020	
"God Gave Rock and Roll to You"	Russ Ballard	?	Book Of Love Tour Live 2007	unknown	2020	
"Hold Your Head Up"	Chris White, Rod Argent	?	Book Of Love Tour Live 2007	unknown	2020	originally performed by Argent (1971)

=== Russ Ballard songs covered by others ===
Song	Time	First recorded by	Album	Producer	Year	Covered by	Other
"A Song For Gail" as "Por Un Amor Relámpago"	4:32	Miguel Bosé	Made In Spain	Óscar Gómez	1983		
"Are You Cuckoo?"	4:02 (single); 3:39 (album)	Bay City Rollers	Dedication (US)	Jimmy Ienner	1977	* Bo Donaldson (1977) * Tommi (1978) * Kim Durant (1979) * Lani Hall (1982)	
"Born On Halloween"	3:25	**Suzanne Lynch**	none	Russ Ballard	1977		
"**Cast The Spirit**"	3:43 (single); 4:00 (album)	America	Your Move	Russ Ballard	1983		
"Dancer"	5:06	Rare Earth	A Brand New World	Gil Bridges, John Greilick, Floyd Stokes	2008		
"Dream On"	4:29	King Kobra	Thrill of a Lifetime	Carmine Appice, Duane Hitchings, Spencer Proffer	1986		
"Feels Like the Real Thing"	4:45	Stormbringer	Stormbringer	Stormbringer	1983		
"Here Comes The Hurt"	4:00	The Rize Band	none	Ron Hanson	1983		
"**I Will Be There**"	4:44	Gogmagog	none	Jonathan King	1985		
"If You'd Only Love Me"	4:36	911	The Greatest Hits and a Little Bit More	Steve Jervier	1999		co-written with Christian Ballard, Andrew Murray
"In Dreams"	5:19	Björn Skifs	If... Then...	Claes af Geijerstam	1984		
"Into the Night"	4:12	Frehley's Comet	Frehley's Comet	Ace Frehley, Eddie Kramer	1987		
"It's Too Late (Ich will dich)"	6:43	Wumpscut	Boeses Junges Fleisch	Rudy Ratzinger	1999		
"Just a Dream Away"	4:17	Roger Daltrey	(Soundtrack album of McVicar)	Jeff Wayne	1980		
"Livin' in Suspicion"	3:56	Graham Bonnet Band	Meanwhile, Back in the Garage	Jimmy Waldo, Giles Lavery	2018		
"Look At Her Dance"	4:40	Wild Cherry	Only the Wild Survive	Rick Hall	1979	Don Clifford	
"**On the Rebound**"	3:15	**Uriah Heep**	Abominog	Ashley Howe	1982		
"**Riding with the Angels**"	3:40	Samson	Shock Tactics	Tony Platt	1981	* Heretic (1986) * Bruce Dickinson (1990)	
"She's A Hurricane"	3:30	Pezband	Pezband – 40 Years Anniversary Deluxe	unknown	2017		
"Since You Been Gone"	2:46	**Clout**	Substitute (aka Clout)	Grahame Beggs	1978	* **Head East** (1978) * **Rainbow** (1979) * Taiska as "Prätkä ja tie" (Finnish) (1980) * The London Symphony Orchestra (1998) and many others	
"**Some Kinda Hurricane**"	3:16	David Wolff	Aura	Vini Poncia	1979	Peter Criss	
"Tonight"	4:02	Tokyo Blade	Tokyo Blade	Kevin D. Nixon, Andy Allen	1983		
"Two Silhouettes"	2:50	Bronz	Carried by the Storm	unknown	2010		
"**Voices**"	3:49	Chris Sutton	Chris Sutton	Dennis Lambert	1986	* **Karen Kamon** (1987) * Chuck Negron (1995)	
"Winning (I'm Winning)"	3:03	Michael Quatro	Gettin' Ready	Ray Ruff, Stuart Allen Love	1977	* **Nona Hendryx** (1977) * **Zkiffz** (1980) * **Santana** (1981) * David Garfield	

== Songs written for Argent, The Roulettes and Unit 4 + 2 ==
Song	Time	First recorded by	Album	Producer	Year	Covered by	Other
"Cast Your Spell Uranus"	4:31	Argent	Ring of Hands	Rod Argent, Chris White	1971		
"Chained"	5:19	Argent	Ring of Hands	Rod Argent, Chris White	1971	Three Dog Night (1972)	
"Closer to Heaven"	3:31	Argent	All Together Now	Rod Argent, Chris White	1972		
"God Gave Rock 'n' Roll to You"	3:30 (single); 6:44 (album)	Argent	In Deep	Rod Argent, Chris White	1973	* Petra (1977) * Dennis Greaves and The Truth (1988) * Kiss (1991) and many others	
"Gonna Meet My Maker"	4:37	Argent	Nexus	Rod Argent, Chris White	1974		
"He's a Dynamo"	3:48	Argent	All Together Now	Rod Argent, Chris White	1972		
"It's Only Money (Part 1)"	4:03	Argent	In Deep	Rod Argent, Chris White	1973		
"It's Only Money (Part 2)" (album version)	5:15	Argent	In Deep	Rod Argent, Chris White	1973		
"It's Only Money (Part 2)" (single version)	3:28	Argent	In Deep	Rod Argent, Chris White	1973		
"Liar"	3:14	Argent	Argent	Rod Argent, Chris White	1969	* Three Dog Night (1970) * Pat Shannon (1971) * Capability Brown (1972) and others	
"Lonely Hard Road"	4:24	Argent	Argent	Rod Argent, Chris White	1970		
"Love"	3:52	Argent	Nexus	Rod Argent, Chris White	1974		
"Man for All Reasons"	3:05 (single); 4:42 (album)	Argent	Nexus	Rod Argent, Chris White	1974		
"Rosie"	3:44	Argent	In Deep	Rod Argent, Chris White	1973		
"Schoolgirl"	3:25	Argent	Argent	Rod Argent, Chris White	1970	Bogdan (1980)	
"Thunder and Lightning" (single version)	3:29	Argent	Nexus	Rod Argent, Chris White	1974		
"Thunder and Lightning" (album version)	5:07	Argent	Nexus	Rod Argent, Chris White	1974		
"Thunder and Lightning" (live)	6:21	Argent	Encore: Live in Concert	Rod Argent, Chris White	1974		
"Tragedy"	4:50	Argent	All Together Now	Rod Argent, Chris White	1972		
"Where Are We Going Wrong"	4:10	Argent	Ring of Hands	Rod Argent, Chris White	1971		
"Jackpot"	2:03	The Roulettes	Stakes and Chips	unknown	1966		co-written with The Roulettes
"Junk"	2:28	The Roulettes	Stakes and Chips	unknown	1965		co-written with The Roulettes
"Mebody"	2:10	The Roulettes	Stakes and Chips	John Burgess	1965		co-written with Bob Henrit
"What You Gonna Do?"	1:58	The Roulettes	Stakes and Chips	John Burgess	1965		co-written with Bob Henrit
"Yesterday, Today and Tomorrow"	2:14	The Roulettes	Stakes and Chips	unknown	1966		co-written with The Roulettes
"3:30"	3:08	Unit 4 + 2	Singles As & Bs	unknown	1969		co-written with Tommy Moeller
"I Will"	2:41	Unit 4 + 2	Singles As & Bs	unknown	1969		co-written with Tommy Moeller and Peter Moules
"So You Want To Be A Blues-Player"	2:53	Unit 4 + 2	Singles As & Bs	Manfred Mann	1968		co-written with Tommy Moeller, Peter Moules, Bob Henrit, Lem Lubin

== Songs written for others ==
Song	Time	First recorded by	Album	Producer	Year	Covered by	Other
"A Girl Like That"	4:05	Colin Blunstone & Rod Argent	Out Of The Shadows	Rod Argent	2001		co-written with Rod Argent
"A Woman In Love"	3:52 (single); 4:17 (album)	Tove Naess	The Album	Russ Ballard	1988		
"All or Nothing"	4:34	Elkie Brooks	No More the Fool	John Stanley	1986		
"Angel"	4:03	Robert Hart	Robert Hart	Russ Ballard	1992		co-written with Robert Hart
"As Far as We Can Go"	3:52	Ringo Starr	Old Wave	Joe Walsh, Russ Ballard	1983		
"Ask Your Mama"	2:40	Hello	The Singles A's & B's Vol. 1	Russ Ballard	1972		
"Better Than The Rest"	4:36	Robert Hart	Robert Hart	Russ Ballard	1992		co-written with Robert Hart
"Boys On The Corner"	4:25	Robert Hart	Robert Hart	Russ Ballard	1992		co-written with Robert Hart
"Break the Chain"	4:19 (single); 4.43 (album)	Elkie Brooks	No More the Fool	Russ Ballard	1986		
"Breaking Down Paradise"	4:07	Roger Daltrey	Under a Raging Moon	Alan Shacklock	1985		
"Breathe"	3:32 (single); 3:45 (album)	Ricki-Lee Coulter	Ricki-Lee	Audius	2005		co-written with Christian Ballard, Andrew Murray, Sara Eker, Lucy Abbott, Dawn Joseph
"Broken"	3:10	Alesha Dixon	Do It for Love	Christian Ballard, Arno Spires	1972		
"C'mon"	2:36	Hello	The Glam Years 1971-1979	Ritchie Gold, Nick Kinsey	1972		
"Can't Break The Habit"	3:08	Helen Shapiro	All For The Love Of Music	Colin Frechter, Bill Kimber	1977	* Pierce Arrow (1978) * Topaz (1979)	
"Can't Let You Go"	3:00	Barry Ryan	Eloise (1995)	Wayne Bickerton	1971	* Suzanne Lynch (1972) * Cliff Richard (1973)	
"Can't Shake Loose"	3:15 (single); 4:22 (album)	Agnetha Fältskog	Wrap Your Arms Around Me	Mike Chapman	1983	* Susanne Lanefelt (1984) * Susanna (2008)	
"Can't We Talk It Over"	3:30	Clout	A Threat and a Promise	Grahame Beggs	1981	* Leslie McKeown (1982) * Chilly (1983)	
"Caught In A Crossfire" = "クロスファイア"	4:45	Climb (3) = クライム	Take A Chance = テイク・ア・チャンス	Steve Klein	1988		
"Come and Get Your Love"	3:39	Roger Daltrey	Ride a Rock Horse	Russ Ballard	1975	* The Pointer Sisters (1978) * Long John Baldry Featuring Kathi McDonald (1979) * Donald Lautrec (1980)	
"Criminal Zero - Detective One"	3:54	Black Market	none	Russ Ballard	1980		
"Detective One"	7:00 (12 inch)	Criminal Zero	none	unknown	1983		
"Do You Want To Make Love"	?	Francie Conway	none	Chris White	1981	Natalie (Make Love)	
"Don't Cry to Me"	4:42	Elkie Brooks	Inspiration	Russ Ballard	1989		
"Don't Let Me Be Lonely"	3:23	America	Your Move	Russ Ballard	1983		
"Don't Wanna Say Goodnight"	4:01	Kandidate	none	Mickie Most	1978	Child (1978)	
"Don't Want to Cry No More"	5:07	Elkie Brooks	No More the Fool	Russ Ballard	1986		
"Everybody's Talking 'Bout a Thing Called Love"	2:38	Adam Faith	Faith Alive!	John Burgess	1965		co-written with Bob Henrit
"First Heartbreak"	2:37	Ian Lloyd	Goose Bumps	Bruce Fairbairn	1979		
"Free Me"	3:59	Roger Daltrey	(Soundtrack album of McVicar)	Jeff Wayne	1980		
"From My Head To My Toe"	2:22	Barry Ryan	Eloise (1995)	Wayne Bickerton	1972		
"Go"	4:56	Mort Shuman	Distant Drum	Peter Van Hooke, Rod Argent	1991	Hannah Jones (1998)	ok co-written with Mort Shuman
"Gotta Give Up Your Love"	3:36	Hot Chocolate	Class	Mickie Most	1980		
"He's So In Love (She's So In Love)"	3:10	Lulu	Don't Take Love for Granted	Mark London, Lem Lubin	1978	The Cats (1985)	
"Heart And Soul"	4:24	Robert Hart	Robert Hart	Russ Ballard	1992		co-written with Robert Hart
"Heartbreaker (You're A)"	2:32	Olivia Newton-John	Let Me Be There	Bruce Welch	1973		
"Hearts of Fire"	4:30	Roger Daltrey	Can't Wait to See the Movie	Alan Shacklock	1987		
"Honey"	3:48	America	Your Move	Russ Ballard	1983		
"House"	3:37	Kindness	World, You Need A Change Of Mind	Adam Bainbridge	2012		co-written with Adam Bainbridge
"How Can I Prove My Love ?"	4:30	Dana	The Girl Is Back	Barry Blue	1979		
"I Can Wait"	2:38	Ola & the Janglers	Under Ground	Gunnar Bergström, Ivor Raymonde,	1967		
"I Can Dream, Can't I"	4:24	Elkie Brooks	Bookbinder's Kid	Trevor Jordan	1988		
"I Can't Dance Alone"	4:17	Tove Naess	The Album	Hasse Olsson	1988		
"I Did It For Love"	4:20 (single); 4:46 (album)	Night Ranger	Man in Motion	Brian Foraker	1988		
"I Don't Believe in Miracles"	3:05	Colin Blunstone	Ennismore	Chris White, Rod Argent	1972	* Argent (1974) * Russ Ballard (1974) * Jimmie Haas (1975) * C.B. Victoria (1976) * America (1980) * Barbara Dickson (1984)	
"I Don't Wanna Say Goodnight"	4:00	Sha-Boom	Let's Party	Clif Magness,	1990		co-written with Clif Magness, Jay Graydon
"I Don't Want To Be Here When You're Gone"	4:43	Robert Hart	Robert Hart	Russ Ballard	1992		co-written with Robert Hart
"I Know There's Something Going On"	4:07 (single); 5:29 (album)	Frida	Something's Going On	Phil Collins	1982	* Co.Ro (1993) * N'Time vs. Larry N'Mike (1998) * Bomfunk MC's feat. Jessica Folcker (2002) and many others	
"I Surrender"	3:29 (single); 4:31 (album)	Head East	U.S. 1	Roger E. Boyd	1980	* Cherie & Marie Currie (1981) * Rainbow (1981) * Stratovarius (2001) and many others	
"I Wish Tonight Could Last Forever"	4:12	Agnetha Fältskog	Wrap Your Arms Around Me	Mike Chapman	1983	Leena Vanamo (1984)	
"I'll Keep Holding On"	3:45	Miguel Bosé	Más Allá	Danilo Vaona	1981	De Blanc (1983)	
"I'll Never Love This Way Again"	4:29	Elkie Brooks	Inspiration	Russ Ballard	1989		
"I'm A Clown"	3:06	New World	none	Russ Ballard	1974		
"I'm Confessing"	3:10	Alan Longmuir	none	C. Fretcher, B. Kimber	1977		
"I'm the One Who Loves You"	3:20	A II Z	none	Andy Scott	1981		
"If You Were Mine"	3:57	911	Wonderland (EP)	Christian Ballard, Andrew Murray	1999		co-written with Christian Ballard, Andrew Murray, Jimmy Constable
"Is Anybody There"	4:12	E. F. Band	Deep Cut	Bengt Fischer, Jan Hultén, Pär Ericsson	1982		
"It's Magical"	3:22	Colin Blunstone	Journey (US)	Russ Ballard	1974		
"Jody"	3:53	America	View from the Ground	Russ Ballard	1982		
"Just Another Day (In The Life Of A Fool)"	5:26 (album)	Phoenix [UK]	In Full View	John Verity, Stuart Alan Love	1979	* Chevy (1981)(In The Life Of A Fool) * Nick Simper's Fandango (1982) * Verity (1983) * Briar (1987)	
"Just For Kicks (Kicks)"	3:34	Savoy Brown	Make Me Sweat	Neil Norman	1988		
"Juliet"	4:15	Girl	Killing Time	unknown	1997		
"Juvenile Offender"	4:54	Little Angels	Young Gods	Andy Julian Paul, James "Jimbo" Barton	1991		
"Let It Rock"	3:31	Hello	Keeps Us Off the Streets CD)	Russ Ballard	1975		
"Let Me Rock You"	3:32	Kandidate	none	Mickie Most	1980	Peter Criss (1982)	
"Let The Wild Run Free"	4:23	Forcefield IV	Let The Wild Run Free	Ray Fenwick	1990		
"Losing You"	4:16	Hot Chocolate	Class	Mickie Most	1981		
"Love Is a Game"	3:17	Girl	Killing Time	Chris Tsangarides	1980	E. F. Band (1982)	
"Love is a Gun"	4:08	Little Angels	Young Gods	Andy Julian Paul, James "Jimbo" Barton	1991		
"Love on the Line"	3:45	Blazin' Squad	In the Beginning	Cutfather & Joe	2002		co-written with Christian Ballard, Andrew Murray
"Matter of Survival"	4:19	Magnum	Goodnight L.A.	Keith Olsen	1990		co-written with Tony Clarkin
"More Fire"	3:22	Skindred	Kill the Power	James Loughrey	2014		co-written with Skindred
"My Dear"	4:28	America	Your Move	Russ Ballard	1983		
"My Kinda Woman"	3:08	America	Your Move	Russ Ballard	1983		
"My Time Is Gonna Come"	3:17	Roger Daltrey	(Soundtrack album of McVicar)	Jeff Wayne	1980		
"Near To Surrender"	2:35	Roger Daltrey	Ride a Rock Horse	Russ Ballard	1975	Black Market (1980)	
"New York Groove"	2:45	Hello	Keeps Us Off the Streets	Mike Leander	1975	* Buck & Sylvie (1975) * Ace Frehley (1978) * Tove Naess (1983) and many others	
"Night Games"	3:19	El Supernaut	Viva!	unknown	2011		
"No Dream Impossible"	3:02	Lindsay Dracass	none	RMP-Sugar Rae-D2M	1991		co-written with Chris Winter, Eurovision Song Contest 2001
"No More the Fool"	4:55	Elkie Brooks	No More the Fool	Russ Ballard	1986	Anna Vissi	
"No Way Out"	3:59	Magnum	Goodnight L.A.	Keith Olsen	1990		co-written with Tony Clarkin
"Nowhere to Run"	4:01	Santana	Shangó	John Ryan	1982		
"Oh What a Night for Romance"	3:12	Rex Smith	Sooner or Later	Charles Calello, Stephen Lawrence	1979	Stephanie de Sykes (1979)	
"One Fatal Kiss"	4:37	Thunder	The Magnificent Seventh!	Luke Morley	2005		co-written with Luke Morley
"Panic Attack"	3:18	Bert Heerink	Better Yet	unknown	2010		
"Picture In A Puzzle"	3:23	Graziella Schazad	Feel Who I Am	Henrik Menzel	2010		co-written with Christian Ballard, Graziella Schazad
"Proud"	4:54	Roger Daltrey	Ride a Rock Horse	Russ Ballard	1975		
"Prove It"	4:06	Rare Earth	A Brand New World	Gil Bridges, John Greilick, Floyd Stokes	2008		
"Raise Me Up"	3:18	Kontrust	Second Hand Wonderland	Arne Neurand	2012		
"Rebel Say A Prayer"	4:23	Bad English	Backlash	Ron Nevison	1991		co-written with John Waite and Jonathan Cain
"Re-United (In Memory Of Kevin)"	3:49	911	Wonderland CD1	Christian Ballard, Andrew Murray	1999		co-written with Christian Ballard, Andrew Murray, Jimmy Constable
"Ridin' On The Wind"	7:04	Robert Hart	Robert Hart	Russ Ballard	1992		co-written with Robert Hart and Chris Winter
"Rockin' Chair"	4:10	Magnum	Goodnight L.A.	Keith Olsen	1990		co-written with Tony Clarkin
"Running Man"	4:20	Robert Hart	Robert Hart	Russ Ballard	1992		co-written with Robert Hart
"S.O.S"	3:12	Graham Bonnet	Line-Up	John Eden	1981		
"Same Song"	4:44	Mort Shuman	Distant Drum	Peter Van Hooke, Rod Argent	1991		co-written with Mort Shuman
"Saturday"	3:59	Skindred	Kill the Power	James Loughrey	2014		co-written with Skindred
"She's A Runaway"	4:11	America	Your Move	Russ Ballard	1983		
"So This Is Eden"	4:37	Bad English	Backlash	Ron Nevison	1991		co-written with John Waite and Jonathan Cain
"So You Win Again"	4:21 (single); 4:32 (album)	Hot Chocolate	Every 1's a Winner	Mickie Most	1977	* Carol Douglas (1978) * Copperfield (1978); Björn Again (1993) and many others	
"Someday We'll Be Together"	4:29	The Pointer Sisters	Black & White	Richard Perry	1981		
"Someone to Watch Over Me"	4:07	Robert Hart	Robert Hart	Russ Ballard	1992		co-written with Robert Hart
"Star Studded Sham"	2:57	Hello	Keeps Us Off the Streets	Mike Leander	1976	The Stiffs (1999)	
"Tears on the Pages"	4:31	Khymera	Khymera	Gabriele Ravaglia	2003	Sunstorm (2009)	co-written with Jon Lind, Jim Peterik
"The Border"	3:37 (single); 3:59 (album)	America	Your Move	Russ Ballard	1983	Detlef Blanke, Michael Kruse (2008)	co-written with Dewey Bunnell
"The Lost City"	2:54	The Shadows	The Sound of The Shadows	unknown	1965	The Aftons	
"The Love of a Child"	4:12	Roberto Alagna	Chante Noël	Jeff Jarratt	2000		co-written with Chris Winter
"The Mirror Lies"	5:09	Graham Bonnet	Anthology 1968-2017	unknown	2015		(My Kingdom Come double single)
"The Time Is Now"	?	Cricket on 5	none	unknown	2011		Cricket on 5 was a UK television program
"The Way You Are"	4:23	Bryn Christopher	My World	Jarrad Rogers, Midi Mafia	2008		co-written with Christian Ballard, Andrew Murray, Brian Harris, Christopher
"Three Wishes"	4:32	Elkie Brooks	Inspiration	Russ Ballard	1989		
"Tonight is for Dreamers"	3:20	America	Your Move	Russ Ballard	1983		
"Turn It Around" (Later released as Lee Brennan's debut solo single in 2002. The 911 version remains unreleased)	?	911	none	unknown	?		co-written with Christian Ballard, Andrew Murray, Lee Brennan
"Twisted"	3:41	Moneypenny	none	unknown	2001	Dennington (2001)	co-written with Christian Ballard, Andrew Murray, Sara Eker, Lucy Abbott, Dawn Joseph
"Wasting My Time"	3:23	Stefanie Heinzmann	Roots to Grow	Paul NZA, Marek Pompetzki	2009		co-written with Christian Ballard, Andrew Murray, Christopher, Brian Harris
"We Live"	4:05	Skindred	Kill the Power	James Loughrey	2014		co-written with Skindred
"What Might Have Been"	4:19	Jimmy Nail	Still Crazy	Clive Langer & Alan Winstanley	1998		co-written with Difford, a soundtrack album from the music-comedy film Still Crazy
"Whatcha' Gonna Do About It"	4:00	Rozalin Woods	Flashback	Ed Martinez	1979		
"Wild Heart"	4:31	Doro	Fight	Doro Pesch, Don Malsch, Chris Lietz	2002		
"Wonderland"	4:16	911	The Greatest Hits and a Little Bit More	Steve Jervier	1999		co-written with Christian Ballard, Andrew Murray, Lee Brennan
"Would I"	3:27	Casanova	All Beauty Must Die	Mr. Bar & Mr. Fly	2004		co-written with Chris Winter
"You Can Do Magic"	3:55	America	View from the Ground	Russ Ballard	1982	* Gottsha (1995) * Painted Love (1996) * John O'Banion (1997) * Netz (2002) * Drew Seeley (2009)	
"You Move Me"	2:52	Hello	The Glam Years 1971-1979	Russ Ballard	1972		
"You Who Are Lonely"	3:53	Colin Blunstone	Journey (US)	Russ Ballard	1974		

== As a producer and/or musician ==
=== Songs ===
Song	Performer	Time	Album	Producer	Playing	Year	Other
"Ain't It Funny"	Colin Blunstone	2:54	Planes	no	Harmony Vocals with Colin Blunstone, Rod Argent	1976	
"All or Nothing"	Elkie Brooks	4:43	No More the Fool	yes	Guitar, Keyboards, Backing Vocals	1986	
"Ask Your Mama"	Hello	2:40	The Singles A's & B's Vol. 1	yes	no	1972	
"Beautiful You"	Colin Blunstone	3:18	Planes	no	Harmony Vocals with Colin Blunstone, Rod Argent	1976	
"Break the Chain"	Elkie Brooks	4:48	No More the Fool	yes	Guitar, Keyboards, Backing Vocals	1986	
"Don't Cry To Me"	Elkie Brooks	4:42	Inspiration	yes	no	1989	
"Don't Want to Cry No More"	Elkie Brooks	5:20	No More the Fool	yes	Guitar, Keyboards, Backing Vocals	1986	
"Fallin'"	Verity	3:44	Interrupted Journey	no	Backing Vocals	1983	
"Fooling Myself"	Phoenix [UK]	3:22	In Full View	no	Backing Vocals with Michael Des Barres	1979	
"Good Guys Don't Always Win"	Colin Blunstone	3:47	Planes	no	Harmony Vocals with Colin Blunstone, Rod Argent	1976	
"Goodbye"	Adam Faith	4:01	I Survived	no	Piano	1974	
"Hell Hound"	Duffy Power	3:16	Just Stay Blue - The CBS Sessions	no	Guitar	1995	
"I Can Almost See The Light"	Colin Blunstone	4:00	Planes	no	Harmony Vocals with Rod Argent	1976	
"I Don't Care"	Lulu	3:13	Don't Take Love for Granted	no	Guitar, Backing Vocals	1979	
"I Survived"	Adam Faith	4:51	I Survived	no	Piano	1974	
"I'll Never Love This Way Again"	Elkie Brooks	4:29	Inspiration	yes	no	1989	
"I'm A Clown"	New World	3:06	none	yes	no	1974	
"Imagine The Swan"	The Zombies	5:10	Odessey and Oracle	no	Guitar	1987	
"It's All For You"	David Courtney	5:13	David Courtney's First Day	no	Guitar with Paul Keogh	1975	
"It's Magical"	Colin Blunstone	3:25	Journey	yes	no	1974	
"Love's Prescription"	Duffy Power	2:55	Just Stay Blue - The CBS Sessions	no	Guitar, Backing Vocals	1995	
"No More the Fool"	Elkie Brooks	4:50	No More the Fool	yes	Guitar, Keyboards, Backing Vocals	1986	
"Remember"	New World	?	Yesterday's Gone	yes	no	1975	
"S.O.S"	Graham Bonnet	3:12	Line-Up	no	Guitar	1981	
"Since I've Been Loving You"	Colin Blunstone	4:38	Planes	no	Harmony Vocals with Colin Blunstone, Rod Argent	1976	
"Strong Love"	Phoenix [UK]	3:21	In Full View	no	Backing Vocals	1979	
"Sweet Dreams"	New World	2:46	Yesterday's Gone	yes	no	1974	
"Tell Me How"	Colin Blunstone	2:11	Planes	no	Harmony Vocals with Rod Argent	1976	
"The Dam Busters March"	Lea Nicholson	3:48	The Concertina Record	no	Lead Guitar	1980	
"The Story So Far"	Roger Daltrey	4:05	Daltrey	no	Piano	1973	
"Three Wishes"	Elkie Brooks	4:32	Inspiration	yes	no	1989	
"Touch My Soul"	Michael Fennelly	4:02	Lane Changer	no	Backing Vocals with Jim Rodford, Rod Argent	1974	
"Wild Heart"	Doro	4:32	Fight	no	Guitar	2002	
"Won't You Please Do That"	Michael Fennelly	3:16	Lane Changer	no	Backing Vocals with Jim Rodford, Rod Argent	1974	
"Yesterday's Gone"	New World	?	Yesterday's Gone	yes with Nick Ingman	no	1975	
"You Move Me"	Hello	2:52	The Glam Years 1971-1979	yes	no	1972	
"You Who Are Lonely"	Colin Blunstone	4:05	Journey	yes	no	1974	

=== Albums ===
Song	Performer	Time	Album	Producer	Playing	Year	Other
Whole Album	America		Your Move	yes	Guitar, Keyboards, Bass, Percussion, Backing Vocals	1983	
Whole Album	Colin Blunstone		Ennismore	no	Guitar, Piano	1972	
Whole Album	Leo Sayer		Another Year	with Adam Faith	Piano, Organ, Marimba	1975	
Whole Album	Leo Sayer		Silverbird	no	Guitar	1973	
Whole album	Robert Hart		Robert Hart	yes	Backing Vocals, Guitar, Harmonica, Keyboards, Organ	1992	
Whole Album	Roger Daltrey		Ride a Rock Horse	yes	Guitar, Organ, Piano, Keyboards	1975	
Whole Album	Roger Daltrey		Daltrey	no	Guitar	1973	
Whole album	Starry Eyed and Laughing		Starry Eyed and Laughing	no	Piano	1974	

== Portrait ==
In 1984, Mary Turner produced a 15-minute portrait of Russ Ballard as a record with the title "A Portrait Of An Artist By Mary Turner".
