= The Argent Anthology - A Collection of Greatest Hits =

Greatest hits album by Argent
- Released: 1976
- Genre: Rock
- Length: 41:53
- Label: Epic
- Producer: Rod Argent, Chris White

Argent chronology
Counterpoints (1975)	The Argent Anthology - A Collection of Greatest Hits (1976)	Hold Your Head Up (1978)

The Argent Anthology - A Collection of Greatest Hits is the first compilation album released by British rock band Argent. It was released on the Epic label in 1976. The British release was called The Best of Argent - An Anthology and had a different track list.

Professional ratings
Review scores
Source	Rating
Allmusic	4.5/5 stars
Christgau's Record Guide	C+

== Track listing ==
1. "Hold Your Head Up" (Rod Argent, Chris White) – 6:15
2. "Liar" (Russ Ballard) – 3:14
3. "Pleasure" (Argent, White) – 4:51
4. "God Gave Rock and Roll to You" (Ballard) – 6:45
5. "It's Only Money, Part 1" (Ballard) – 4:04
6. "Thunder and Lightning" (Ballard) – 5:05
7. "Tragedy" (Ballard) – 4:47
8. "Time Of The Season" [Live] (Argent) – 6:40

- Tracks 1 and 7 are from All Together Now
- Track 2 is from Argent
- Track 3 is from Ring of Hands
- Tracks 4 and 5 are from In Deep
- Track 6 is from Nexus
- Track 8 is from Encore: Live in Concert

=== UK track listing ===
1. "Schoolgirl" (Ballard) – 3:21
2. "It's Only Money, Part 1" (Ballard) – 4:04
3. "Pleasure" (Argent, White) – 4:51
4. "Hold Your Head Up" (Argent, White) – 6:15
5. "Thunder and Lightning" (Ballard) – 5:05
6. "Liar" (Ballard) – 3:14
7. "God Gave Rock and Roll to You" (Ballard) – 6:45
8. "Keep On Rollin'" (Argent, White) – 4:25

- Track 1 and 6 are from Argent
- Tracks 2 and 7 are from In Deep
- Track 3 is from Ring of Hands
- Tracks 4 and 8 are from All Together Now
- Track 5 is from Nexus

== Personnel ==
Argent

- Rod Argent – keyboards, vocals
- Russ Ballard – guitar, vocals
- Jim Rodford – bass guitar, vocals
- Robert Henrit – drums, percussion
