= Encore: Live in Concert =

Encore

Live album by Argent
- Released: 8 November 1974
- Recorded: Theatre Royal, Drury Lane, London - 24 February 1974; City Hall, St. Albans - 9 March 1974; Top Rank, Swansea
- Genre: Progressive rock; pop rock
- Length: 78:06
- Label: Epic
- Producer: Rod Argent, Chris White

Argent chronology
Nexus (1974)	Encore (1974)	Circus (1975)

Professional ratings
Review scores
Source	Rating
AllMusic	3.5/5 stars

Encore is a live double-LP by Argent, released on 8 November 1974 on Epic Records PEG 33079. The performance includes the Rod Argent penned Zombies hit "Time of the Season" (1968) and the Russ Ballard penned "I Don't Believe In Miracles" which was a UK #31 hit for Colin Blunstone in 1972. Blunstone had previously been the vocalist in the Zombies with Rod Argent.

== Track listing ==
LP 1, Side one
No.	Title	Writer(s)	Length
1.	"The Coming of Kohoutek"	Chris White, Rod Argent	10:34
2.	"It's Only Money, Part 2" (erroneously credited as "Part 1")	Russ Ballard	3:51
3.	"It's Only Money, Part 1" (erroneously credited as "Part 2")	Russ Ballard	5:04

LP 1, Side two
No.	Title	Writer(s)	Length
4.	"God Gave Rock and Roll to You"	Russ Ballard	7:03
5.	"Thunder and Lightning"	Russ Ballard	6:21
6.	"Music from the Spheres"	Chris White, Rod Argent	9:15

LP 2, Side three
No.	Title	Writer(s)	Length
7.	"I Don't Believe in Miracles"	Russ Ballard	3:27
8.	"I Am the Dance of Ages"	Chris White, Rod Argent	9:28
9.	"Keep on Rollin'"	Chris White, Rod Argent	5:19

LP 2, Side four
No.	Title	Writer(s)	Length
10.	"Hold Your Head Up"	Chris White, Rod Argent	11:16
11.	"Time of the Season"	Rod Argent	6:38

== Personnel ==
Argent

- Rod Argent – piano, organ, keyboards, vocals
- Russ Ballard – electric guitar, vocals (plus uncredited piano on "I Don't Believe in Miracles")
- Jim Rodford – bass guitar, vocals
- Robert Henrit – drums, percussion
