= All Together Now (Argent album) =

Studio album by Argent
- Released: April 1972 (UK)
- Recorded: 1971
- Studios: Abbey Road, London
- Genres: Progressive rock; hard rock
- Length: 41:42; 71:18 (CD re-release)
- Label: Epic
- Producers: Chris White, Rod Argent

Argent chronology
Ring of Hands (1971)	All Together Now (1972)	In Deep (1973)

All Together Now is the third album by British rock band Argent, released in April 1972 on Epic Records, KE 31556. It was Argent's first hit album; it features "Hold Your Head Up", their most successful single, which reached No. 5 in the UK, Canadian, and U.S. singles charts. Other featured songs include "Tragedy" which reached No. 34 in the UK, "I Am the Dance of Ages" and "He's a Dynamo". The album reached No. 14 in Canada.

The 1997 compact disc re-release of All Together Now by Koch Records features an additional seven tracks not included on the original seven-track vinyl record. The bonus tracks include "God Gave Rock and Roll to You", which, owing to the popular cover/remake by Kiss, is one of Argent's best-known songs.

In 2009, for their reunion, Mr. Big recorded a cover of "Hold Your Head Up" and played it throughout the tour. Australian rock supergroup the Party Boys covered "Hold Your Head Up" in 1987 on their only studio album, The Party Boys. Uriah Heep also covered the song on their 1989 album Raging Silence. All bonus tracks were previously released on albums, except "Kingdom", which was the flip side of the "Celebration" single, and "Closer to Heaven" which was the B-side of the single "Hold Your Head Up".

Steppenwolf covered "Hold Your Head Up" on their 1982 album Wolftracks.

In 2012, Esoteric Recordings of Europe released the album (ECLEC 2321) with "Closer to Heaven" as a bonus track.

== Critical reception ==
Professional ratings
Review scores
Source	Rating
AllMusic	4/5 stars
The Rolling Stone Record Guide	3/5 stars

In the Q and Mojo Classic Special Edition Pink Floyd & the Story of Prog Rock, the album ranked 33rd in the list of "40 Cosmic Rock Albums".

== Track listing ==
Songs written by Rod Argent and Chris White except as noted.

Side one
No.	Title	Writer(s)	Length
1.	"Hold Your Head Up"		6:18
2.	"Keep On Rollin'"		4:32
3.	"Tragedy"	Russ Ballard	4:50
4.	"I Am the Dance of Ages"		3:46

Side two
No.	Title	Writer(s)	Length
5.	"Be My Lover, Be My Friend"		5:21
6.	"He's a Dynamo"	Ballard	3:48
7.	"Pure Love" a. "Fantasia" (5:00) b. "Prelude" (1:35) c. "Pure Love" (5:31) d. "Finale" (1:01)		13:07

The UK release had a red hype sticker on the cover, reading “Includes the hit singles "Hold Your Head Up" and "Tragedy"”. It was a gatefold album with a four-page booklet, each page featuring a band member, with many photos.

1997 KOCH Records CD re-release bonus tracks
No.	Title	Writer(s)	Length
8.	"Celebration"	Argent, White	2:54
9.	"Kingdom"	Argent, White	3:09
10.	"Closer to Heaven"	Ballard	3:31
11.	"Rejoice"	Argent, White	3:47
12.	"God Gave Rock and Roll to You"	Ballard	6:45
13.	"Christmas for the Free"	Argent, White	4:16
14.	"It's Only Money (Part 2)"	Ballard	5:15

"Celebration" and "Rejoice" are from the 1971 album Ring of Hands. "God Gave Rock and Roll to You", "It's Only Money (Part 2)" and "Christmas for the Free" are from the 1973 album In Deep. "Kingdom" is the B-side of the 1971 single "Celebration"; "Closer to Heaven" is the B-side of the 1972 single "Hold Your Head Up".

2012 release with 1 bonus track:
No.	Title	Writer(s)	Length
8.	"Closer to Heaven"	Ballard	3:31

== Personnel ==
Argent

- Rod Argent – organ, electric piano, vocals
- Russ Ballard – guitar, piano (on track 3), vocals
- Jim Rodford – bass guitar, guitar, vocals
- Bob Henrit – drums, percussion

== Charts ==
Chart (1972)	Peak position
Canada Top Albums/CDs (RPM)	14
UK Albums (Official Charts)	13
US Billboard 200	23

== Releases ==
- CD All Together Now Sony Music Distribution 1994
- CD All Together Now Koch / eOne / Koch International 1997
- CD All Together Now Acadia 2006
- CD All Together Now [Bonus Tracks] Acadia 2007
- CD All Together Now Sony Music Distribution 2008
- CD All Together Now [Bonus Track] Esoteric Records 2012
