= In Deep (Argent album) =

Studio album by Argent
- Released: 5 October 1973
- Genres: Rock, progressive rock
- Length: 45:03
- Label: Epic
- Producers: Chris White, Rod Argent

Argent chronology
All Together Now (1972)	In Deep (1973)	Nexus (1974)

Professional ratings
Review scores
Source	Rating
AllMusic	2/5 stars

In Deep is the fourth studio album by English rock band Argent, released by Epic Records in October 1973. It features the original full-length recording of "God Gave Rock and Roll to You", which reached No. 18 in the UK charts (U.S. No. 114) when released in edited form as a single later the same year. It was remade by Kiss as "God Gave Rock 'n' Roll to You II" for the film Bill & Ted's Bogus Journey in 1991. The album reached No. 69 in Canada.

== Track listing ==
Side one
No.	Title	Writer(s)	Length
1.	"God Gave Rock and Roll to You"	Russ Ballard	6:44
2.	"It's Only Money, Part 1"	Ballard	4:03
3.	"It's Only Money, Part 2"	Ballard	5:08
4.	"Losing Hold"	Rod Argent, Chris White	5:30

Side two
No.	Title	Writer(s)	Length
5.	"Be Glad"	Argent, White	8:38
6.	"Christmas for the Free"	Argent, White	4:15
7.	"Candles on the River"	Argent, White	7:01
8.	"Rosie"	Ballard	3:44

== Personnel ==
Argent

- Russ Ballard – electric and acoustic guitars, lead vocals
- Rod Argent – organ, backing vocals, piano, electric piano, Mellotron; lead vocals on "Christmas for the Free"
- Jim Rodford – bass, backing vocals
- Robert Henrit – drums, percussion

Additional personnel

- Derek Griffiths – guitar solo on "Christmas for the Free" (Ballard was taken ill in the studio)

== Charts ==
Chart (1973)	Peak position
Canada Top Albums/CDs (RPM)	69
UK Albums (Official Charts)	49
US Billboard 200	90
