= Ring of Hands =

Studio album by Argent
- Released: February 1971
- Recorded: 1970
- Studio: Sound Techniques, London
- Genre: Progressive rock
- Length: 42:40
- Label: Epic
- Producer: Rod Argent, Chris White

Argent chronology
Argent (1970)	Ring of Hands (1971)	All Together Now (1972)

Professional ratings
Review scores
Source	Rating
AllMusic	3/5 stars

Ring of Hands is a 1971 album and the second released by British rock band Argent. It was originally released on Epic Records, E 30128.

The song "Chained" was re-recorded by Three Dog Night on their 1972 release Seven Separate Fools. This was the second Argent song covered by them.

== Track listing ==
Songs written by Rod Argent and Chris White except as noted.

Side one
No.	Title	Writer(s)	Length
1.	"Celebration"		2:55
2.	"Sweet Mary"		4:06
3.	"Cast Your Spell Uranus"	Russ Ballard	4:31
4.	"Lothlorien"		7:50

Side two
No.	Title	Writer(s)	Length
5.	"Chained"	Ballard	5:19
6.	"Rejoice"		3:46
7.	"Pleasure"		4:52
8.	"Sleep Won't Help Me"		5:11
9.	"Where Are We Going Wrong"	Ballard	4:10

== Personnel ==
Argent

- Rod Argent – organ, electric piano, lead (1, 2, 6, 7) and backing vocals
- Russ Ballard – guitar, lead (1–5, 8, 9) and backing vocals, piano (3)
- Jim Rodford – bass guitar, backing vocals, guitar
- Robert Henrit – drums, percussion

Technical

- Jerry Boys – engineer

A two-disc CD re-issue of this album plus Argent (1970) was released by BGO Records in 2000.
