= Disciples of Christ (hip-hop group) =

American hip hop group

- Origin: Tulsa, Oklahoma, U.S.
- Genres: Christian hip hop; Christian rap; funk; soul
- Labels: Star Song, We are One/Throne Room
- Past members: Alton Hood; Kelvin Harvey; Michael Brown; Matt Stevens; David Brooks

Disciples of Christ were an American Christian hip hop group that originated in Tulsa, Oklahoma, in the early 1990s. They released three studio albums on Star Song Records from 1991 to 1994. The group later formed their own record label, We are One/Throne Room Records, and released an extended play in 1998 and a fourth studio album in 2003. Alton Hood and Michael Brown of the group formed Nimisilla Park in 2016, carrying on the D.O.C. tradition of Christian rock and hip hop with a twist of soul.

== History ==
=== Beginnings ===
The core of the group was Ben Reges (born Alton Hood) and Absalom (Kelvin Harvey) who were attending Oberlin College on football scholarship and friend Prophet (Michael Brown). Hood says of that time,

"Basically we were into the world. We both had scholarships to play football. We didn't have Christ in our lives, so we began to party and live the high life, hanging out with girls, that whole party life. We had this void in our lives. So what happened was that I was introduced by some friends to the occult. It got pretty serious."

Hood credits God with cleaning up both him and Harvey from drug addictions born out of their use in occult rituals:

"Praise God, through a supernatural manifestation of the Holy Spirit, God's power came down right there in the room, saved me, delivered me right there on the spot...".

Following their conversion to Christianity, the duo began performing raps and beat-boxing at parties. A year later they met third member Prophet (Michael Brown) at a Canton church which they now attended having moved to the Northeast Ohio area.

=== Deal with Star Song ===
Former rock band drummer Matt Stevens was the final member to join. The band met him while in the studio making a demo recording on the advice of friends. According to Hood, they didn't really think anything would happen with it:

"We were never into rap for the business or industry standpoint. We were just doing it as a tool. It was just a good idea to send [our demo] out, it was not like we put our hopes behind it-it was just something to do. We were content to be just in the northeastern Ohio area ministering, but God saw fit, because of our faithfulness to Him, to take it abroad."

The demo was noticed by Star Song Records who included the group on a 1990 sampler. The group's debut studio album So How Ya Livin'? was released in 1991. Also that year the group's Alton Hood, Jr made a guest rap appearance on labelmate Whitecross's album In the Kingdom, rapping on the song "Holy War". In 1993, the group released Pullin' No Punches and did another Christian metal collaboration, this time for Bride's cover of Argent's "God Gave Rock and Roll to You". The song "Innocent Love" was released as a single during that year.

With their third album, Righteous Funk, in 1994, the group began to resist the rap label and emphasize the 70s funk sounds they grew up on. ("We come from the '70s era of funk: Parliament, Earth, Wind & Fire, Heatwave. So, it was really great that we were able to express and come forth with that and introduce the Christian market to something they might not have ever known about.") The songs "Hollywood" and "Wind Me Up" featured funk legends Bootsy Collins, Maceo Parker, Bernie Worrell and Fred Wesley. The album earned the group a Grammy nomination.

=== Forming We are One/Throne Room records ===
Reduced to a duo of "Hoody Roc" (Alton Hood) and "Disciple Paul" (David Brooks) and based in Cleveland, Ohio, the group formed their own record label, We are One/Throne Room Records, through which they released the EP Birth of the Rapusical Era in 1998 and their fourth studio album The Antidote in 2003. The album was promoted with a tour merging their music with mime, poetry, dance and drama in a package the group called a "Rapusical".

== Discography ==
Disciples of Christ discography
- Studio albums: 4
- Extended plays: 1
- Singles: 1

Studio albums

- So How Ya Livin'? (1991)
- Pullin' No Punches (1993)
- Righteous Funk (1994)
- The Antidote (2003)

Singles

- Innocent Love (1993)

Extended play

- Birth of the Rapusical Era (1998)
