= Nexus (Argent album) =

Studio album by Argent
- Released: March 1974
- Genre: Progressive rock
- Length: 41:59
- Label: Epic
- Producer: Chris White, Rod Argent

Argent chronology
In Deep (1973)	Nexus (1974)	Encore (1974)

Alternative cover

Professional ratings
Review scores
Source	Rating
AllMusic	2/5 stars

Nexus is the fifth album by British rock band Argent. It was released in March 1974 on CBS Records. "Nexus" was the last Argent album to feature guitarist/lead singer Russ Ballard.

== Track listing ==
Songs written by Rod Argent and Chris White except as noted.

Side one
No.	Title	Writer(s)	Length
1.	"The Coming of Kohoutek" (instrumental)		3:01
2.	"Once Around the Sun" (instrumental)		2:49
3.	"Infinite Wanderer" (instrumental)		3:42
4.	"Love"	Russ Ballard	3:51
5.	"Music from the Spheres"		8:10

Side two
No.	Title	Writer(s)	Length
6.	"Thunder and Lightning"	Ballard	5:05
7.	"Keeper of the Flame"		6:02
8.	"Man for All Reasons"	Ballard	4:44
9.	"Gonna Meet My Maker"	Ballard	4:35

== Personnel ==
Argent

- Rod Argent – organ, electric piano, lead vocals on "Music from the Spheres"
- Russ Ballard – guitar, vocals
- Jim Rodford – bass guitar, guitar, vocals
- Robert Henrit – drums, percussion

== Charts ==
Chart (1974)	Peak position
US Billboard 200	149
