= Night Games (Graham Bonnet song) =

1981 single by Graham Bonnet

Single by Graham Bonnet

from the album Line-Up
- B-side: "Out on the Water"
- Released: 6 March 1981
- Recorded: 1981
- Studio: Red Bus, London
- Genre: AOR; pop rock
- Length: 3:25 (single version); 4:36 (album version)
- Label: Vertigo
- Songwriter(s): Edwin Hamilton
- Producer(s): Francis Rossi; John Eden

Graham Bonnet singles chronology
"Can't Complain" (1978)	"Night Games" (1981)	"Liar" (1981)

"Night Games" is a song by British singer Graham Bonnet released as a single in March 1981 from his third solo album Line-Up. It peaked at number 6 on the UK Singles Chart.

== Background and release ==
"Night Games" was written by Edwin Hamilton and was first recorded in the mid-1970s by rock band Fast Buck, for whom Hamilton was the lead vocalist and also guitarist. However, the band's version remained unreleased until the release of the box set Night Games – The Complete Recordings in 2019.

Graham Bonnet had been the lead vocalist for the British rock band Rainbow between 1979 and 1980, recording one studio album, Down to Earth. After leaving the band and whilst staying in New York, Bonnet's then manager David Oddie gave him a tape of "Night Games". Bonnet thought "it was perfect, coming across as the sort of poppy hard rock tune that I should be doing. It seemed to follow on from what I had done in Rainbow". It was then recorded in early 1981 with many well-known musicians playing alongside Bonnet and was planned to be released as a single at the end of February, though it was pushed back a week to the beginning of March.

The single was co-produced by Status Quo lead singer and guitarist Francis Rossi and producer John Eden, who had also worked on Bonnet's first two solo albums. Rossi has said that Oddie wanted "a 'face' to produce ["Night Games"], someone to help with the profile and marketing" and Rossi agreed so long as he had a "good engineer with me in the studio, because I had no experience in the role", so Eden was also brought in. After the single's release, Bonnet went on to record the album Line-Up, with "Night Games" and the B-side "Out on the Water" both included on it.

Reviewing for Record Mirror, Simon Tebbutt wrote that the song has "a clever contradiction of lyrical pessimism and musical optimism with a driving chorus which overcomes Francis Rossi's somewhat melodramatic production".

== Track listing ==
7": Vertigo / VER 1

1. "Night Games" – 3:25
2. "Out on the Water" – 3:27

== Personnel ==
- Graham Bonnet – lead vocals, harmony vocals
- Micky Moody – electric guitar, acoustic guitar
- Gary Twigg – bass guitar
- Andy Bown – piano, organ
- Cozy Powell – drums
- Francis Rossi – electric sitar, synthesizer

== Charts ==
Chart (1981)	Peak position
Finland (Suomen virallinen lista)	10
Ireland (IRMA)	3
UK Singles (OCC)	6
