= Argent (album) =

Studio album by Argent
- Released: January 1970
- Recorded: 1969 ("(P) 1969" on original vinyl label)
- Studio: Sound Techniques, London
- Genre: Progressive rock; hard rock
- Length: 40:13
- Label: Epic
- Producer: Rod Argent, Chris White

Argent chronology
Argent (1970)	Ring of Hands (1971)

Professional ratings
Review scores
Source	Rating
AllMusic	3.5/5 stars
Christgau's Record Guide	B
The Village Voice	B+

Argent is the debut album by British rock band Argent. Released in 1970 on CBS Records (USA: Epic Records, BN 26525), the album did not chart in either the U.S. or the UK and did not produce any hit singles, although the song "Liar" would become a top-10 Billboard hit the following year through a cover version by Three Dog Night. ("Liar" b/w "Schoolgirl" was issued in the US as a 45 on Date, before CBS moved the band to their Epic label.) The track "Dance in the Smoke" was made popular in the UK by its inclusion on the best-selling CBS Sampler album Fill Your Head with Rock (1970).

== Track listing ==
Songs written by Rod Argent and Chris White except as noted.

Side one
No.	Title	Writer(s)	Length
1.	"Like Honey"		3:13
2.	"Liar"	Russ Ballard	3:12
3.	"Be Free"		3:51
4.	"Schoolgirl"	Ballard	3:23
5.	"Dance in the Smoke"		6:16

Side two
No.	Title	Writer(s)	Length
6.	"Lonely Hard Road"	Ballard	4:22
7.	"The Feeling's Inside"		3:48
8.	"Freefall"		3:20
9.	"Stepping Stone"		4:38
10.	"Bring You Joy"		4:10

== Personnel ==
Argent

- Russ Ballard – guitar, lead (2–4, 6, 9, 10) and backing vocals, piano (6)
- Rod Argent – organ, backing and lead (1, 5, 7, 8) vocals, electric and acoustic pianos
- Jim Rodford – bass, backing vocals
- Robert Henrit – drums, percussion

Technical

- Jerry Boys – engineer
- Tony Lane – artwork, cover design

A two-disc CD re-issue of this album plus Ring of Hands was released by BGO Records in 2000.
