= Inspiration (Elkie Brooks album) =

Studio album by Elkie Brooks
- Released: 1989 (UK)
- Recorded: 1989
- Genre: Rock/pop
- Label: Telstar Records
- Producer: Russ Ballard

Elkie Brooks chronology
Bookbinder's Kid (1988)	Inspiration (1989)	Pearls III (Close to the Edge) (1991)

Inspiration is a 1989 album by Elkie Brooks. It is a mixture of cover versions and original tracks and includes the single "Shame". It was recorded 1989 at Abbey Road Studios, RPM Studios, Pavilion Studios, Rock House and Woody Bay Studios. The album was issued on CD, vinyl and cassette in 1989 through Telstar Records, and re-released on CD and cassette by Ronco.

Inspiration reached number 58 and remained in the UK charts for 3 weeks.

"Shame" was originally entered in the 1989 A Song for Europe, sung by Jane Alexander, coming third.

== Track listing ==
1. "Hard Habit to Break" (Steve Kipner, Jon Parker) (4:41)
2. "Shame" (Peter Oxendale, Marwenna Haver) (4:10)
3. "Broken Wings" (Richard Page, Steve George, John Lang) (4:55)
4. "1,000 Years" (Joseph Williams, David Paich, Mark Williams) (4:47)
5. "Touch of Paradise" (Ross Wilson, Gulliver Smith) (4:20)
6. "Tear It Down" (Chris Thompson, Andy Hill) (4:21)
7. "Don't Cry to Me" (Russ Ballard) (4:42)
8. "Three Wishes" (Russ Ballard) (4:32)
9. "I'll Never Love This Way Again" (Russ Ballard) (4:29)
10. "Every Little Bit Hurts" (Ed Cobb) (3:28)
11. "Is This Love" (David Coverdale, John Sykes) (4:42)
12. "Black Smoke from the Culumet" (Brooks, Pete Gage) (5:18)
13. "Maybe I'm Amazed" (Paul McCartney) (3:39)
14. "The Ki" (Brooks) (4:05)
15. "In It for the Same Thing" (Brooks) (3:51)
16. "You're the Inspiration" (Peter Cetera, David Foster) (3:39)

== Single releases ==
- "Shame" (1989)
- "You're the Inspiration" (1989, Netherlands only)
- "I'll Never Love This Way Again" (1990)

== Personnel ==
- Elkie Brooks - vocals
- Tobias Boshell - piano, keyboards
- Paul Stacey - guitars
- Pip Williams - guitars, bass guitar
- Mike Richardson - drums
- Francis Rossi, Bernie Frost, Chris Thompson - backing vocals
- Trevor Jordan, Stevie Bray - engineers

=== Producers ===
- Russ Ballard, Trevor Jordan, Pip Williams, Gary Hutchins
