= Pearls III (Close to the Edge) =

Studio album by Elkie Brooks
- Released: 1 October 1991
- Recorded: 1991
- Studio: Woody Bay Studios
- Genre: Rock; pop
- Label: Freestyle
- Producer: Trevor Jordan

Elkie Brooks chronology
Inspiration (1989)	Pearls III (Close to the Edge) (1991)	Round Midnight (1993)

Professional ratings
Review scores
Source	Rating
AllMusic	3/5 stars

Pearls III (Close to the Edge) is an album by Elkie Brooks.

Issued on CD, vinyl and cassette in 1991 through Freestyle Records, the album failed to enter the UK charts after a difficult distribution deal stalled.

== Track listing ==
All tracks written by Elkie Brooks, except where noted.

No.	Title	Writer(s)	Length
1.	"The Last Teardrop"	Steve Thompson	3:58
2.	"Don't Go Changing Your Mind"	Brooks; Andrew Murray; Brendon Taylor	4:30
3.	"We Are All Your Children"	Brooks; Trevor Jordan	3:27
4.	"One of a Kind"	Thompson; Tommy Morrison	3:45
5.	"Tell Her"		4:35
6.	"You and I (Are You Lonely)"		3:08
7.	"Free to Love"	Brooks; Gary Hutchins	3:07
8.	"Suits My Style"		2:53
9.	"Got to Get Better"		4:44
10.	"From the Heart"		5:02

== Single releases ==
- "The Last Teardrop" (1991)
- "One of a Kind" (1991, Belgium only)

== Personnel ==
- Elkie Brooks – vocals
- Andrew Murray – piano, keyboards
- Trevor Jordan – piano, keyboards, producer, engineer
- Paul Dunn – guitars
- Brendon Taylor – bass guitar, drums
