= Argent (band) =

British rock band

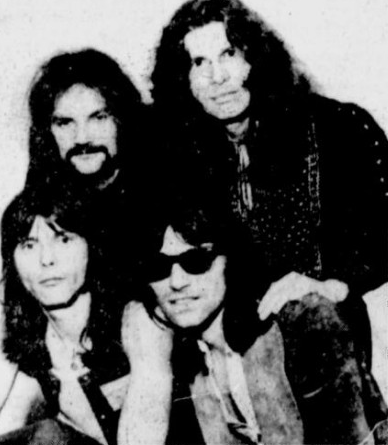
- Argent in 1973. Clockwise from left, Bob Henrit, Jim Rodford, Rod Argent, Russ Ballard

Background information
- Origin: London, England
- Genres: Rock; progressive rock; hard rock; pop rock
- Years active: 1969–1976, 2010-2013
- Spinoffs: Phoenix
- Spinoff of: The Zombies, The Roulettes
- Past members: Rod Argent; Bob Henrit; Jim Rodford; Russ Ballard; John Verity; John Grimaldi

Argent were a British rock band formed in 1969 by former Zombies keyboardist Rod Argent. They had three UK Top 40 singles: "Hold Your Head Up", which reached No. 5 and spent 12 weeks on the chart, "Tragedy" (No. 34), and "God Gave Rock and Roll to You" (No. 18). Two of their albums charted in the UK: All Together Now, which peaked at No. 13 in 1972, and In Deep, which spent one week at No. 49 in 1973.

== History ==
Rod Argent put together his eponymous-named band just as his former band the Zombies' post-breakup single "Time of the Season" was becoming a worldwide hit in 1969. His new band employed much heavier rhythms and a generally weightier sound, but also continued the minor keys and complex lyrics of the Zombies, often by Argent's writing with former Zombies bassist Chris White. Guitarist and vocalist Russ Ballard also developed strong melodies and hit singles, writing a string of FM staples. The band was completed by bassist Jim Rodford and drummer Bob Henrit. Lead vocal duties were shared between Ballard and Argent.

Their first album, Argent, was critically acclaimed, if not a massive seller. It was a solid start and contained the song "Liar", which was subsequently covered by Three Dog Night. 1971's Ring of Hands was their second album and featured the minor hit "Sweet Mary". All Together Now was their third album, released in 1972. It featured the song for which they are best remembered: "Hold Your Head Up", which was a Top 5 hit in both UK and the US charts.

Their next album, In Deep, contained two more hits in "God Gave Rock and Roll to You" and "It's Only Money". 1974's Nexus was dominated by Rod Argent's writing, with Ballard only contributing 4 of the album's 9 songs. The album's centrepiece, "The Coming of Kohoutek", was inspired by that year's appearance of the comet of the same name. Uninspired by this change and seeking a vehicle for his prodigious songwriting, Ballard left after the album's release to pursue a successful career as a solo artist. Ballard's departure was followed by the release of the live album Encore.

The band regrouped as a quintet with the addition of young virtuoso guitarist John Grimaldi and guitarist/vocalist John Verity. Both of their final albums, Circus and 1975's Counterpoints, were poorly received and failed to sell, though their final concert tours were well attended. In 1975, John Grimaldi left the band. While Rod Argent considered whether to continue Argent, the remaining members (Henrit, Rodford and Verity) became Phoenix.

The original Argent lineup reunited at the High Voltage Festival in Victoria Park, London on 25 July 2010, and undertook a short five-date concert tour in December 2010, with gigs in Frome, Southampton, Wolverhampton, Leamington Spa, and London.

Argent also reunited for a five-show tour from January to February 2012, before performing one last show at the Waterside Theatre in Aylesbury as part of a benefit concert, on 2 June 2013, supporting the Zombies, on a bill that also included Marillion members Steve Hogarth and Steve Rothery.

Rodford died after a fall on 20 January 2018, at age 76.

== Band members ==
- Rod Argent – keyboards, backing and lead vocals (1969–1976, 2010, 2012, 2013)
- Bob Henrit – drums (1969–1976, 2010, 2012, 2013)
- Jim Rodford – bass guitar, backing vocals (1969–1976, 2010, 2012, 2013; died 2018)
- Russ Ballard – guitar, lead vocals (1969–1974, 2010, 2012, 2013)
- John Verity – guitar, lead vocals (1974–1976)
- John Grimaldi – guitar (1974–1975; died 1983)

	1969-1974	1974-1976		2010, 2012, 2013
Rod Argent	keyboards, backing and lead vocals, producer, songwriter	keyboards, backing and lead vocals, producer, songwriter	keyboards, backing and lead vocals, producer, songwriter	keyboards, backing and lead vocals
Bob Henrit	drums	drums	drums	drums
Russ Ballard	guitar, lead vocals, songwriter			guitar, lead vocals
Jim Rodford	bass guitar, backing vocals	bass guitar, backing vocals, songwriter	bass guitar, backing vocals, songwriter	bass guitar, backing vocals
John Verity		guitar, lead vocals	guitar, lead vocals	
John Grimaldi		guitar	guitar, songwriter	
Chris White	producer, songwriter	producer	producer	
Tony Visconti			producer	

== Songs ==
Argent's biggest hit was the Rod Argent and Chris White composition "Hold Your Head Up", featuring lead vocals by Russ Ballard, from the All Together Now album, which, in a heavily edited single form, reached No. 5 in the US. It sold over one million copies, and was awarded a gold disc.

The sound of the band was a mix of rock and pop, but also covered more progressive rock territory in songs like "The Coming of Kohoutek", an instrumental from their Nexus album. When Ballard left the band after Encore, they took an even more progressive/fusion turn with their final Epic album Circus and then signed to a new record label (RCA) for the final 1975 album Counterpoints. By 2005, all albums, including compilations, have been re-released on CD, except Counterpoints.

== Legacy ==
Argent recorded the original version of "God Gave Rock and Roll to You", written by Russ Ballard, which was covered by Kiss in 1991 under the name "God Gave Rock 'n' Roll to You II", and featured prominently at the end of the film Bill & Ted's Bogus Journey. The song also became a Contemporary Christian rock anthem and was twice covered by the Christian Rock band Petra, in 1977 (on the album Come and Join Us) and again in 1984 (on the album Beat the System), with new verses.

Some of Ballard's compositions became hits when they were covered by other artists, including Rainbow ("Since You Been Gone", from the album Down to Earth, and "I Surrender", from the album Difficult to Cure), Kiss, Petra, Hello, Santana, and more recently the Brazilian metal band Oficina G3. The Russ Ballard song "Liar", on Argent's first album, became a hit for Three Dog Night in 1971 and was also released as a single, ten years later, by Graham Bonnet (former Rainbow vocalist, who sang the vocal on "Since You Been Gone"), taken from his debut album Line-Up.

Fish (former lead singer of Marillion) recorded a version of "Hold Your Head Up" for his 1993 album Songs from the Mirror, a selection of his favourite songs. The American band Phish play an instrumental version of "Hold Your Head Up", usually as a transition into a "joke song" by drummer Jon Fishman. "Hold Your Head Up" was covered in 1987 by the band 20/Twenty and (in the same year) by Australian group the Party Boys. Mother Love Bone recorded a cover of "Hold Your Head Up" in 1989. Their version was released on a promotional only 7" vinyl in 1989. It was reissued on 7" vinyl in 2014 as a limited edition Black Friday Record Store Day release on Stardog/Republic Records. The band Jellyfish opened most of their shows with an abbreviated version of "Hold Your Head Up".

== Discography ==
=== Studio albums ===
Year	Album	Label	Peak chart positions		
Year	Album	Label	US	UK	CAN
1970	Argent	Epic	–	–	–
1971	Ring of Hands	Epic	–	–	–
1972	All Together Now	Epic	23	13	14
1973	In Deep	Epic	90	49	69
1974	Nexus	Epic	149	–	–
1975	Circus	Epic	171	–	–
1975	Counterpoints	RCA	–	–	–
"–" denotes releases that did not chart.

=== Live albums ===
Year	Album	Peak chart positions	
Year	Album	US	UK
1974	Encore	151	–
1995	In Concert	–	–
1997	The Complete BBC Sessions	–	–
2010	High Voltage Festival	–	–
"–" denotes releases that did not chart.

=== Compilation albums ===
- The Best of Argent - An Anthology (Epic, 1976)
- Hold Your Head Up (1978)
- Music from the Spheres (1991)
- Greatest: The Singles Collection (2008)
- Argent: Original Album Classics [A collection of the band's first five albums in miniature album sleeves] (2009)
- God Gave Rock and Roll to You: The Greatest Hits (2010)
- Hold Your Head Up: The Best of Argent (2022)

=== Singles ===
Year	Song	Peak chart positions		Album
Year	Song	US	UK	Album
1970	"Liar"	–	–	Argent
1970	"Schoolgirl"	–	–	Argent
1971	"Sweet Mary"	102	–	Ring of Hands
1971	"Celebration"	–	–	Ring of Hands
1972	"Hold Your Head Up"	5	5	All Together Now
1972	"Tragedy"	106	34	All Together Now
1973	"God Gave Rock and Roll to You"	114	18	In Deep
1973	"It's Only Money, Part 2"	–	53 (Note: Chart position is from the official UK "Breakers List".)	In Deep
1974	"Man for All Reasons"	–	–	Nexus
1974	"Thunder & Lightning"	–	–	Nexus
1974	"Time of the Season"	–	–	Encore
1975	"The Jester"	–	–	Circus
1975	"Highwire"	–	–	Circus
1975	"Rock 'n' Roll Show"	–	–	Counterpoints
"–" denotes releases that did not chart.
