= The Roulettes =

1960s British musical group

- Origin: London, England
- Genres: Rock; beat; rock and roll
- Years active: 1962–1967
- Labels: Pye, Parlophone
- Past members: Peter Thorp; Martin Blackwell; Tony Burgess; John Roberts; Brian Parker; Norman 'Henry' Stracey; John Rogers; Alan 'Honk' Jones; Russ Ballard; Bob Henrit; John 'Mod' Rogan

The Roulettes were a British rock and roll and beat group formed in London in 1961. They were recruited to play as the backing group to singer Adam Faith the following year, and continued to perform and record until the late 1960s.

== History ==
The group originated among friends at Sutton High School for Boys, including guitarist Peter Thorp. Originally called the Strangers, they were seen by publicist Leslie Perrin, who recommended them to Adam Faith's manager Eve Taylor. Faith was looking for a touring band that would enable him to perform similar music to that of the beat bands then emerging from Merseyside. Renamed the Roulettes, the band - then comprising Peter Thorp, Martin Blackwell, Tony Burgess and John Roberts - first performed with Faith at the Royal Albert Hall in September 1961.

The group toured widely with Faith between 1961 and 1963, with several changes of personnel, many instigated by Faith. They recorded one unsuccessful single for Pye, "Hully Gully Slip 'N' Slide". By early 1963, the group comprised Thorp (guitar), the only remaining Strangers member, John Rogers (bass), Bob Henrit (drums), and Russ Ballard (guitar and keyboards). They recorded a six weeks series of short 15-minute shows with Adam Faith for Radio Luxembourg. John Rogers was killed in a car crash in May 1963 as a passenger in a vehicle carrying the band's kit up North to a gig; he was replaced by John 'Mod' Rogan, previously of Hartlepool group the Hartbeats.

They began recording with Adam Faith - who had previously recorded with session musicians - for the Parlophone label, and their records were credited to "Adam Faith with The Roulettes". They enjoyed a run of chart hits with Faith in the mid-1960s, including the UK chart hits; "The First Time", "We Are in Love", "I Love Being in Love With You", "If He Tells You", and "Someone's Taken Maria Away".

They also recorded in their own right for Parlophone, recording several early compositions by Chris Andrews, though none of their singles reached the chart. Their only album Stakes And Chips was released in 1965, consisting predominantly of the A and B sides of their previous singles, but with similar lack of success. As well as backing Adam Faith on record, they most notably backed him on a 'Live' album. The Roulettes continued to accompany him on tour until October 1965. Early in 1967 they joined the Philips Fontana label but still the charts eluded them. They continued to tour in Europe until later that year, when the group split up.

Band members Russ Ballard and Bob Henrit went on to join Unit 4 + 2 formed by former Hunters member Brian Parker (on whose 1965 number one song, "Concrete and Clay", they had played); the two would later also become members of rock band Argent. In addition Ballard had later success as a solo artist and songwriter, whilst Henrit became a renowned session drummer and also replaced The Kinks' long serving drummer Mick Avory in their later years.

Adam Faiths song Cowman Milk Your Cow was written by Bee Gees members Barry and Robin Gibb. Fleetwood Mac's Peter Green also played guitar on the song.

== Members ==
- Peter Thorp – lead guitar, rhythm guitar (born 25 May 1944, Wimbledon, South West London), died 2 January 2021 from COVID (original band member when still named the Strangers)
- Brian Parker – lead guitar (born Brian William Parker, 1940, Cheshunt, Hertfordshire, died 17 February 2001) (brought in to replace Thorp and left after two weeks, with Thorp resuming)
- Johnny Rogers – bass guitar (born John Rogers, 1941, Hertfordshire, died 27 May 1963, Lincolnshire from injuries in a car crash)
- Alan 'Honk' Jones – saxophone (Alan Evan Thomas Jones, born 19 August 1933, Norwood, London, died 3 October 2022 Kent, (left The Roulettes)
- Norman Stracey – rhythm guitar, also keyboards (born Norman Henry Stracey, 1941, Ware, Hertfordshire) (left in February 1963)
- Bob Henrit – May 1962 onwards, drums (born Robert John Henrit, 2 May 1944, Broxbourne, Hertfordshire)
- Russ Ballard – March 1963 onwards, keyboards, later lead guitar and lead vocals (born Russell Glyn Ballard, 31 October 1945, Waltham Cross, Hertfordshire) (replaced Stracey in the band, was recruited to play keyboards and shared lead guitar with Thorp)
- John 'Mod' Rogan – May 1963 onwards, bass guitar (born John George Rogan, 3 February 1944, Hartlepool, County Durham) (replaced Rogers after he died)

== Discography ==
=== Singles ===
- "Hully Gully Slip 'N' Slide" / "La Bamba" – Pye Records 7N 15467 – October 1962
- "Soon You'll Be Leaving Me" / "Tell Tale Tit" – Parlophone R 5072 – 8 November 1963
- "Bad Time" / "Can You Go" – Parlophone R 5110 – 6 March 1964
- "I'll Remember Tonight" / "You Don't Love Me" – Parlophone R 5148 – June 1964
- "Stubborn Kind of Fellow" / "Mebody" – Parlophone R 5218 – 11 December 1964
- "I Hope He Breaks Your Heart" / "Find Out The Truth" – Parlophone R 5278 – May 1965
- "The Long Cigarette" / "Junk" – Parlophone R 5382 – 26 November 1965
- "The Tracks of My Tears" / "Jackpot" – Parlophone R 5419 – 11 March 1966
- "I Can't Stop" / "Yesterday, Today And Tomorrow" – Parlophone R 5461 – 3 June 1966
- "Rhyme Boy, Rhyme" / "Airport People" – Fontana TF 822 – 21 April 1967
- "Help Me To Help Myself" / "To A Taxi Driver" – Fontana TF 876 –October 1967

=== Albums ===
- Stakes And Chips – LP - Parlophone LC 0299 – 1965
- Russ, Bob, Pete & Mod – Compilation LP – Edsel Records ED 113 – 1983
