= Winning (song) =

1976 song by Russ Ballard

Single by Russ Ballard

from the album Winning
- Released: 1976
- Recorded: 1976
- Genre: Pop rock
- Length: 3:40
- Label: Epic
- Songwriter: Russ Ballard
- Producer: Muff Winwood

"Winning"

Single by Santana

from the album Zebop!
- B-side: "Brightest Star"
- Released: 1981
- Recorded: 1981
- Genre: Pop rock
- Length: 3:29
- Label: Columbia
- Songwriter: Russ Ballard
- Producers: Carlos Santana, Keith Olsen

Santana singles chronology
"Searchin'" (1981)	"Winning" (1981)	"The Sensitive Kind" (1981)

Music video
- "Winning" on YouTube

"Winning" is a pop rock single originally written and recorded by Russ Ballard on his 1976 album of the same name. It was subsequently recorded by Latin rock band Santana for the 1981 album, Zebop! The lead vocal on the Santana version was performed by Alex Ligertwood, with David Margen on bass. It was the sixth track on the album and was released as the third single (backed with "Brightest Star") and as a promotional music video.

The Santana version reached number 2 on the Mainstream Rock Chart and number 17 on the U.S. Billboard Hot 100. The song reached number 12 in South Africa. Record World called the song "well-crafted" with its "snappy percussion" and "yearning vocal" from Ligertwood. Billboard characterized it as "a commercial Journey-esque style number".

== Other versions ==
"Winning" was also recorded by rock/R&B singer Nona Hendryx (formerly of Labelle) for her 1977 debut solo album.

"Winning" was also recorded by Norwegian heavy metal singer Jørn Lande on his 2020 album, Heavy Rock Radio II: Executing the Classics.

"Winning" was also recorded by country singer Keith Urban, and released as a bonus track on the Target deluxe edition of his 2010 album, Get Closer.

== Charts ==
=== Santana version ===
Chart (1981)	Peak position
Australian Singles (Kent Music Report)	88
Canada Top Singles (RPM)	18
US Billboard Hot 100	17
US Mainstream Rock (Billboard)	2
