= Rod Argent =

British rock musician (born 1945)

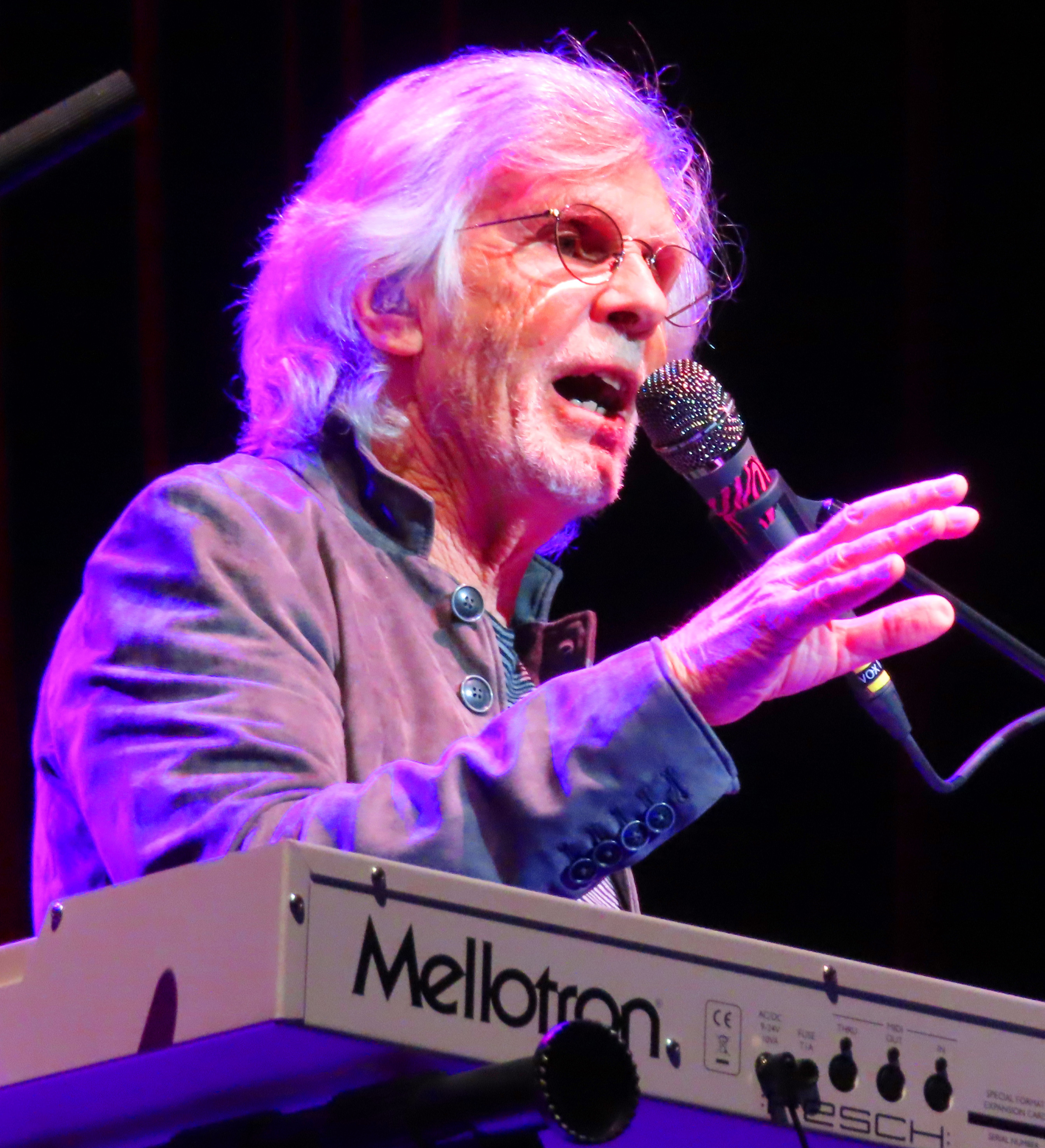
- Argent performing in September 2019

Background information
- Born: Rodney Terence Argent; 14 June 1945 (age 81); St Albans, Hertfordshire, England
- Genres: Rock; pop; psychedelic rock; progressive rock; classical
- Occupations: Musician; singer; songwriter; composer; record producer
- Instruments: Keyboards; vocals
- Years active: 1958–present
- Labels: Decca; CBS
- Website: rodargent.com

Rodney Terence Argent (born 14 June 1945) is an English musician. In a career spanning more than 60 years, Argent came to prominence in the mid-1960s as the keyboardist, founder and leader of the rock band the Zombies, and went on to form the band Argent after the first break-up of the Zombies.

Argent is one of the main composers of the Zombies' music and made major lyrical contributions to the band's songs. As the band's keyboardist he used a variety of instruments, including Hohner Pianet, Mellotron, harpsichord, and organ.

In addition to his work with the Zombies and Argent, Argent has made music for television series, been a session musician, produced albums by other artists, and had a solo career which has included three studio albums: Moving Home, Red House, and Classically Speaking. Argent was inducted into the Rock and Roll Hall of Fame as a member of the Zombies in Brooklyn in March 2019.

== Early years ==
Argent was born in St Albans, Hertfordshire, into a working-class family. His father, Les Argent, was an aeronautical engineer who machined parts at the De Havilland aircraft factory; he had also been the leader of two semi-professional dance bands, the Les Argent Quartet and Les Argent and his Rhythm Kings. Although his father did not teach him music, Argent was raised hearing his father playing the upright piano in the family home. Argent's mother was one of eight children and Argent grew up with "a substantial network of cousins, uncles and aunts" living in the town.

He decided to become a musician "aged eight or nine", and as a child, he sang as a chorister in the St Albans Cathedral Choir. While at St Albans School, he met Paul Atkinson and Hugh Grundy. Argent, Atkinson, and Grundy first played together at a jam on Easter 1961 in St Albans.

Argent wanted to form a band and initially asked his cousin Jim Rodford to join as a bass guitarist. Rodford was playing in local band called the Bluetones at the time, so declined. Colin Blunstone and Paul Arnold joined the new band in early 1961, while all five members were still at school. Arnold left not long after and was replaced by Chris White. After the band won a local contest, they recorded a demo as their prize. Argent's song "She's Not There" got them a recording contract with Decca.

== Career ==
=== The Zombies ===
In addition to playing the piano and keyboards in the Zombies, Argent was (with White) one of the group's two main songwriters, penning the hits "She's Not There", "Tell Her No", and "Time of the Season", amongst others. Argent was initially the group's lead singer, with Blunstone on guitar. When Argent's keyboard talents became apparent, he became the group's full-time keyboard player, conceding the role of lead singer to Blunstone. Despite this, Argent performed sporadic lead vocals for the band on tracks such as "I Got My Mojo Working" from Begin Here and "I Want Her, She Wants Me" from Odessey and Oracle. The group continued to record until disbanding in December 1967, reportedly over management disagreements.

=== Argent ===
After the band broke up, Argent went on to form the band Argent, which had a hit album in 1972 with All Together Now, which contained the single "Hold Your Head Up". His Hammond B3 solo on that track was cited by Rick Wakeman as the "greatest organ solo ever". The band also recorded the original version of the rock anthem "God Gave Rock and Roll to You", written by lead singer Russ Ballard, which was later covered by other artists including Petra and Kiss. Argent's first album included the song "Liar" (also composed by Ballard), which became a hit for Three Dog Night. In 1976, the band broke up.

=== Solo career ===
In 1978, Argent released his debut solo album Moving Home with many well-known musicians, including Gary Moore, Genesis drummer Phil Collins, and Weather Report bass guitarist Alphonso Johnson. In 1980, he wrote a musical titled Masquerade which premiered in London in 1982. In 1988, he issued another solo album, Red House.

Argent went on to play keyboards with a number of musicians, including piano on the title track of The Who's album Who Are You, and on Variations with Gary Moore, Julian Lloyd Webber, and Andrew Lloyd Webber. In the 1980s, he began writing for television. In 1986, he composed the theme music for ITV's coverage of the 1986 FIFA World Cup, Aztec Gold, which he released as a single under the name of Silsoe. Also in 1986, he composed the theme music for ITV's The Two of Us and for 1987's LWT series Bust. Two years later, the Argent/Van Hooke composition "Goal Crazy" was used by ITV's The Match from 1988 until 1992; and the duo also composed the now-familiar theme music for ITV's It'll Be Alright On The Night, first used in series 6 in 1990 and then until 2008. Argent also composed the theme music to the ITV (LWT) sitcom The Piglet Files, which aired from 1990 to 1992.

In 1987, Argent formed a production company with ex-Van Morrison drummer Peter Van Hooke which produced a number of artists. In 1995, Argent produced Soraya's debut album On Nights Like This and her second album Wall Of Smiles. Other albums the business partners produced included Tanita Tikaram's Ancient Heart (1988), Nanci Griffith's Late Night Grande Hotel (1991), Joshua Kadison's Painted Desert Serenade (1993), and Jules Shear's Healing Bones (1994).

In 1999, Argent recorded a solo piano album, Rod Argent Classically Speaking, in which he played Chopin études and music by Ravel, Bach, and Grieg, as well as three of his own compositions. In 2006, Argent joined Hamish Stuart, Richard Marx, Billy Squier, Edgar Winter and Sheila E. to tour with Ringo Starr & His All-Starr Band.

=== The Zombies reunion ===
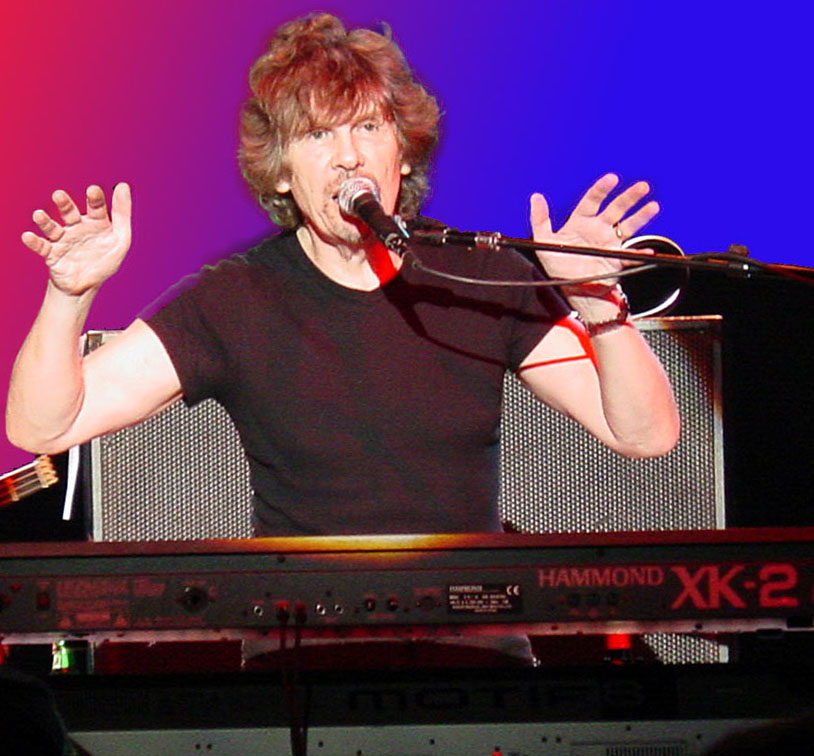
Argent in 2005

In 2004, Argent and Colin Blunstone recorded a new album, As Far as I Can See..., in the style of The Zombies. A subsequent album and DVD Colin Blunstone & Rod Argent of the Zombies Live at the Bloomsbury Theatre received favourable reviews, as did their 2007 US tour. One critic noted, "The Zombies, still led by original keyboard wizard Rod Argent and featuring the smoked-silk vocals of Colin Blunstone, is the best 60s band still touring which doesn't have Mick Jagger as a front man".

Argent continued to tour with Colin Blunstone as The Zombies, and in March 2008 the original surviving members of the band played three reunion concerts at the Shepherd’s Bush Empire, performing the album Odessey and Oracle. The band were introduced by Al Kooper, who had discovered the album in a record shop in Carnaby Street in London after the band had broken up. He promoted it on radio stations in the US, leading to "Time of the Season" becoming a Top 3 hit in the singles charts. The sold out concerts (attended by several DJs and musical celebrities) led to a band reunion. In a 2015 interview with PopMatters journalist J.C. Maçek III about the Zombies' latest album Still Got That Hunger, Argent said "Still Got That Hunger is the first album that has really recaptured some of the resonance of feeling of a group. We're so tight as a group together now. And the whole process has become so organic that we're 100% happy with the Zombies name and rediscovering and playing all the old stuff and at the same time carving a new path forward which is also very, very important to us."

In 2012, Argent participated in the unveiling of a Blue Plaque at The Blacksmith's Arms, a pub in St Albans where the Zombies met for their first rehearsal.

== Personal life ==
Argent and his wife Cathy met at a party in 1967, and they married in 1972. They have two children, Elesa and Mark. In July 2024, Argent, at 79 years old, suffered a stroke, and on 11 July 2024 he announced his retirement from touring.

== Discography ==
=== With the Zombies ===
==== Studio albums ====
- Begin Here (UK) / The Zombies (US) (1965)
- Odessey and Oracle (1968)
- The Return of the Zombies (1990)/New World (1991)
- R.I.P. (2000, recorded in 1968)
- Out of the Shadows (2001) (credited to Colin Blunstone & Rod Argent)
- As Far as I Can See... (2004)
- Breathe Out, Breathe In (2011)
- Still Got That Hunger (2015)
- Different Game (2023)

==== EPs ====
- The Zombies (1964)

==== Live albums ====
- Live at the BBC (2003)
- Live at the Bloomsbury Theatre, London (2005) (also on DVD)
- On the BBC Radio (2007)
- Odessey and Oracle: 40th Anniversary Live Concert (2008) (also on DVD)
- Live in Concert at Metropolis Studios (2012)
- Live in the UK (2013)

==== Singles ====
Title	Year
"She's Not There" b/w "You Make Me Feel Good"	1964
"Leave Me Be" b/w "Woman"	1964
"Tell Her No" UK & AUS b/w "What More Can I Do?" US & CAN b/w "Leave Me Be"	1964
"She's Coming Home" b/w "I Must Move"	1965
"I Want You Back Again" b/w "I Remember When I Loved Her"	1965
"Whenever You're Ready" b/w "I Love You"	1965
"Just Out of Reach" b/w "Remember You"	1965
"Is This the Dream?" b/w "Don't Go Away"	1966
"Indication" b/w "How We Were Before"	1966
"Gotta Get a Hold of Myself" b/w "The Way I Feel Inside"	1966
"Goin' Out of My Head" b/w "She Does Everything for Me"	1967
"Friends of Mine" b/w "Beechwood Park"	1967
"Care of Cell 44" b/w "Maybe After He's Gone"	1967
"Time of the Season" b/w "I'll Call You Mine" b/w "Friends of Mine" (1969 US re-release)	1968
"I Love You" b/w "The Way I Feel Inside"	1968
"Butcher's Tale (Western Front 1914)" b/w "This Will Be Our Year"	1968
"Imagine the Swan" b/w "Conversation Off Floral Street"	1969
"If It Don't Work Out" b/w "Don't Cry For Me"	1969
"Dropped Reeling & Stupid"	2023

=== With Argent ===
==== Studio albums ====
Album	Year
Argent	1970
Ring of Hands	1971
All Together Now	1972
In Deep	1973
Nexus	1974
Circus	1975
Counterpoints	1975

==== Live albums ====
Album	Year
Encore: Live in Concert	1974
In Concert	1995
The Complete BBC Sessions	1997
High Voltage Festival	2010

==== Singles ====
Song	Year
"Liar"	1970
"Schoolgirl"	1970
"Sweet Mary"	1971
"Celebration"	1971
"Hold Your Head Up"	1972
"Tragedy"	1972
"God Gave Rock and Roll to You"	1973
"It's Only Money, Part 2"	1973
"Man for All Reasons"	1974
"Thunder & Lightning"	1974
"Time of the Season"	1974
"The Jester"	1975
"Highwire"	1975
"Rock 'n' Roll Show"	1975

Gymnopedies No 1 1977

=== With Shadowshow ===
- Shadowshow – Shadowshow (1985)

=== Solo albums ===
- Moving Home (1978)
- Ghosts (1981) (with Barbara Thompson)
- Metro (1983) (with John Dankworth)
- A New Age (1984) (with Robert Howes)
- Second Sight (1984) (with Robert Howes)
- Network Heroes (1987) (with Robert Howes)
- The Advance of Man (1988) (with Robert Howes)
- Red House (1988)
- Rescue (1989) (with Robert Howes)
- Classically Speaking (1998)

=== Appearances ===
- Pastourelle (Inspired By The Songs Of The Auvergne) (1982)
- Wild Connections (1987)
