= God Gave Rock and Roll to You =

1973 single by Argent

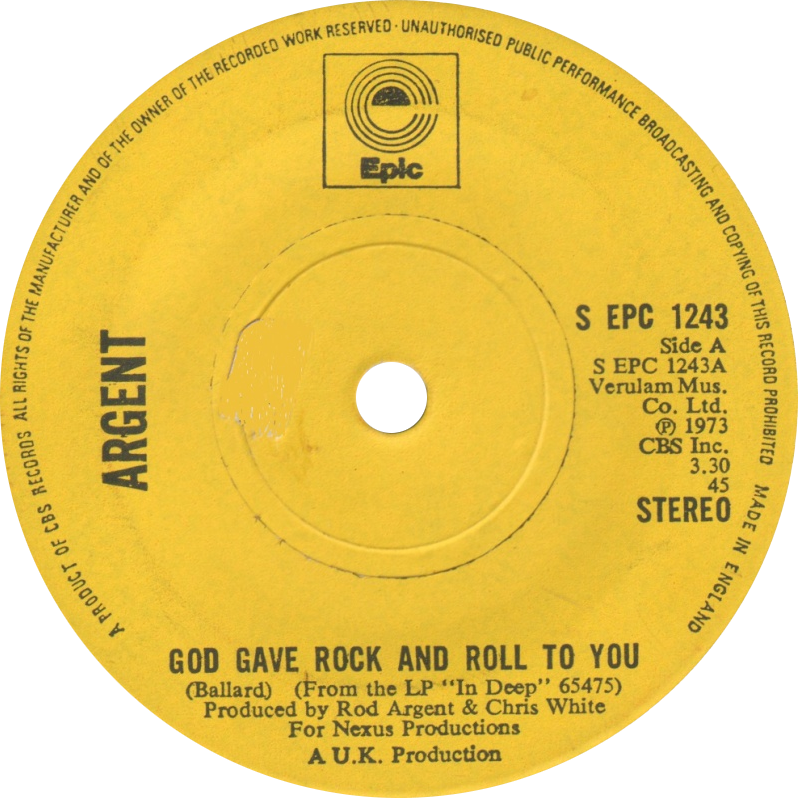
- One of side-A labels of UK single

Single by Argent

from the album In Deep
- B-side: "Christmas for the Free"
- Released: 23 March 1973
- Recorded: 1973
- Studio: Abbey Road (London, England)
- Length: 6:45 (album version); 3:30 (single edit)
- Label: Epic
- Songwriter: Russ Ballard
- Producers: Rod Argent; Chris White

Argent singles chronology
"Tragedy" (1972)	"God Gave Rock and Roll to You" (1973)	"It's Only Money, Part 2" (1973)

"God Gave Rock and Roll to You" is a 1973 song by the British band Argent and first covered by Petra in 1977 and again in 1985, and covered by Kiss as "God Gave Rock 'N' Roll to You II" in 1991 with modified lyrics.

== Argent ==
=== Background ===
Russ Ballard wrote “God Gave Rock and Roll to You” in early 1973 at his parents’ home in Hertfordshire, composing it in about 20 minutes on an Eavestaff upright piano. Having endured a difficult period while both his parents were seriously ill with cancer, he described the song as reflecting his return to happiness. The lyrics included a reference to British pop singer Cliff Richard, known for his Christianity.

Ballard presented the song to Argent at the band’s rehearsal space in St Albans. Rod Argent wanted the song to be slower than that conceived by Ballard, and a near seven minute version was recorded for their upcoming album In Deep. Ballard stated "The record version dragged, to me." The band edited the track down for the single version, and Rod Argent spoke about the difficulty of this in a 1973 interview with Beat Instrumental stating "it becomes a different song completely."

=== Release ===
Record World listed the song in their 'hits of the week' section, saying "this Russ Ballard song will make them giants... cut will penetrate charts almost immediately." Cash Box listed the track in their 'Picks of the Week' column, stating "English band hits you with the hook chorus right away and keeps your interest throughout thanks to their instrumental prowess and lyrics."

The song spent eight weeks in the UK Singles Chart, peaking at number 18. It did not break into the top 100 in the US, but did appear in the Billboard Bubbling Under Hot 100 at number 114.

=== Charts ===
Chart (1973)	Peak position
UK Singles (OCC)	18
US Billboard Hot 100 (bubbling under)	114

=== Personnel ===
Contributions taken from rear album cover of In Deep

- Russ Ballard – electric and acoustic guitar, lead vocals
- Jim Rodford – bass, backing vocals
- Rod Argent – organ, backing vocals, piano, electric piano, Mellotron
- Bob Henrit – drums, percussion

== Cover versions ==
=== Petra ===
"God Gave Rock and Roll to You" was covered by American Christian rock band Petra for their 1977 album Come and Join Us and again on their 1984 album Beat the System. Although Ballard is credited, Petra's version features completely different verses, written by Bob Hartman to give it a more spiritual dimension.

=== Other ===
The song was covered by The Truth in 1989 who released it as a single from their album Jump. Bride featuring D.O.C. released a cover in 1993. Neither band managed to chart.

== Kiss ==
"God Gave Rock 'n' Roll to You II"

Single by Kiss

from the album Bill & Ted's Bogus Journey: Music from the Motion Picture and Revenge
- Released: 22 August 1991
- Genre: Rock
- Length: 5:18
- Label: Interscope
- Songwriters: Russ Ballard; Paul Stanley; Gene Simmons; Bob Ezrin
- Producer: Bob Ezrin

Kiss singles chronology
"Rise to It" / "Silver Spoon" (1990)	"God Gave Rock 'n' Roll to You II" / "Junior's Gone Wild (performed by King's X / Shout It Out (performed by Slaughter)" (1991)	"Unholy" / "God Gave Rock 'n' Roll to You II" (1992)

"God Gave Rock 'n' Roll to You II" (1991)
Harmonizing with Paul Stanley during the bridge of "God Gave Rock 'n' Roll to You II" would be Eric Carr's final recording with Kiss before his death in 1991.

American hard rock band Kiss covered the song in 1991 as "God Gave Rock 'n' Roll to You II" for the soundtrack to Bill & Ted's Bogus Journey. The track was released as a single in 1991 and appeared on the band's 1992 album Revenge.

Though the power ballad covered the original Argent 1973 version "God Gave Rock and Roll to You", it had modified lyrics in the verses, thus the reason behind the slight change in the name of the song. It is one of the few songs from Kiss' "non-makeup era" to be played live since the band returned to wearing their trademark makeup in 1996.

It was the last Kiss song to feature longtime drummer Eric Carr before his death three months later after it was released as a single. Although he was too ill to play drums on the track, he appears on the video.

The single was also the first to feature Gene Simmons and Paul Stanley sharing lead vocals since "I" from 1981's Music from "The Elder".

=== Personnel ===
Kiss

- Paul Stanley – lead vocals, rhythm guitar
- Gene Simmons – co-lead vocals, bass guitar
- Bruce Kulick – lead guitar, backing vocals
- Eric Singer – drums, percussion, backing vocals
- Eric Carr – backing vocals

Additional personnel

- Tommy Thayer, Jesse Damon, Jaime St. James – backing vocals
- Steve Vai – intro guitar solo on single version

=== Chart performance ===
The song made the top 10 in Ireland, the United Kingdom, Germany, and Switzerland. In the United States, it reached No. 21 on the Billboard Album Rock Tracks chart.

=== Versions ===
The version released as a single and on the soundtrack to Bill & Ted's Bogus Journey differs slightly from that played in the film. In the film, a 40-second guitar solo is played by Steve Vai. It was later included on Steve Vai's album The Elusive Light and Sound, Vol. 1 under the title "Final Solo". "God Gave Rock & Roll to You II" would also be included on the Kiss albums Revenge in 1992 and in a live version on Alive III, released in 1993.

=== Charts ===
Weekly charts

Chart (1991–1992)	Peak position
Australia (ARIA)	18
Austria (Ö3 Austria Top 40)	16
Europe (Eurochart Hot 100)	19
Germany (GfK)	9
Ireland (IRMA)	5
Sweden (Sverigetopplistan)	24
Switzerland (Schweizer Hitparade)	4
UK Singles (Official Charts)	4
UK Airplay (Music Week)	18
US Mainstream Rock (Billboard)	21

Year-end charts

Chart (1992)	Position
Australia (ARIA)	64
Europe (Eurochart Hot 100)	77
Germany (Media Control)	43
Switzerland (Schweizer Hitparade)	38
UK Singles (OCC)	61
