= Line-Up (album) =

Studio album by Graham Bonnet
- Released: October 1981
- Studio: Red Bus, Marquee Studios, The Glade, RAK Studios, RAMP Studios, Roundhouse Studios, London, UK
- Genre: Rock
- Length: 38:13
- Label: Vertigo
- Producer: John Eden, Francis Rossi

Graham Bonnet chronology
Down to Earth (1979)	Line-Up (1981)	Assault Attack (1982)

Singles from Line-Up
- 1. "Night Games" Released: 6 March 1981; 2. "Liar" Released: 5 June 1981; 3. "That's the Way That It Is" Released: 2 October 1981

Professional ratings
Review scores
Source	Rating
AllMusic	3/5 stars
Collector's Guide to Heavy Metal	5/10

Line-Up is the third album released by English singer Graham Bonnet, formerly of Rainbow. The album made extensive use of musicians and songwriters who, at the time, were members of bands like Whitesnake and Status Quo.

== Track listing ==
Side one

1. "Night Games" (Ed Hamilton) – 4:38
2. "S.O.S." (Ballard) – 3:12
3. "I'm a Lover" (David Kerr-Clemenson, Andrew Martin Locke) – 3:46
4. "Be My Baby" (Phil Spector, Jeff Barry, Ellie Greenwich) – 3:03
5. "That's the Way That It Is" (Paul Bliss) – 3:18

Side two

6. "Liar" (Russ Ballard) – 3:04
7. "Anthony Boy" (Chuck Berry) – 3:28
8. "Dirty Hand" (Bob Young, Micky Moody) – 3:40
9. "Out on the Water" (Young, Moody) – 3:40
10. "Don't Stand in the Open" (Young, Moody) – 3:25
11. "Set Me Free" (Ray Davies) – 4:19

CD Bonus Tracks

12. "Don't Tell Me to Go (b-side)" (Young, Moody, Markee)
13. "Bad Days Are Gone (b-side)" (Young, Moody)
14. "Night Games (single edit)" (Hamilton)
15. "Out on the Water (single edit)" (Young, Moody)

== Personnel ==
Musicians

- Graham Bonnet – lead and backing vocals
- Micky Moody – lead guitar, acoustic guitar on track 1
- Francis Rossi – synthesizer in track 1, rhythm guitar and backing vocals on track 9, producer on tracks 1 and 9
- Russ Ballard – guitar on track 2
- Kirby Gregory – guitar on tracks 2 and 4
- Rick Parfitt – guitar on track 7
- Gary Twigg – bass
- Chris Stewart – bass on tracks 2, 3, 5
- Neil Murray – bass on track 9
- Adrian Lee – synthesizer on tracks 2, 3, 6, 8, 11, keyboards on track 10
- Ian Lynn – synthesizer on tracks 7 and 9, electric piano on track 7
- John Cook – keyboards on track 8
- Andy Bown – piano on track 1 and 9, organ on track 1
- Jon Lord – organ on track 5
- Cozy Powell – drums, percussion
- Martin Ditcham – percussion on track 10
- Mel Collins – saxophone on track 2

Production

- John Eden – producer, engineer
- Arun Chakraverty – mastering
