= Hold Your Head Up =

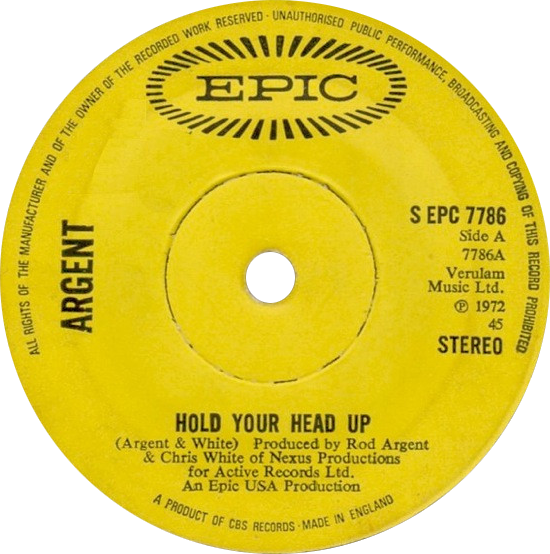
- One of side-A labels of UK 45-RPM single

Single by Argent

from the album All Together Now
- B-side: "Closer to Heaven" "Keep On Rollin'"
- Released: 1 October 1971 (UK)
- Studio: Abbey Road Studios, London
- Genre: Progressive rock; hard rock; pop rock
- Length: 6:15 (album version); 3:15 (single edit); 2:52 (radio edit)
- Label: Epic
- Songwriters: Rod Argent, Chris White
- Producers: Rod Argent, Chris White

Argent singles chronology
"Sweet Mary" (1971)	"Hold Your Head Up" (1971)	"Tragedy" (1972)

Audio
- "Hold Your Head Up" on YouTube

"Hold Your Head Up" is a song by the English rock band Argent, first released as a single in 1971. The song peaked at No. 5 on the US, UK, and Canadian charts; however, it was the band's only song to chart on the Billboard Hot 100. Billboard ranked it as the No. 50 song for 1972. The song appeared on the third Argent album All Together Now (1972). The song was covered by Uriah Heep on their 1989 album Raging Silence.

== Background, composition, and recording ==
The song was written by Chris White and credited to the songwriting partnership of White and Rod Argent.

== Release and reception ==
The song was warmly received by music critics. Record World called it an "infectious rocker" that should "have strong impact" in the U.S. Georgiy Starostin thought that it was the best track on All Together Now, the band's quintessential album. He called it "a solid, riffy tune whose main attractions are the gruff, almost war-march-style bassline" and praised Rod Argent's keyboard work. The Hammond B3 solo on the track has been described by keyboard player Rick Wakeman as the "greatest organ solo ever".

== Release history ==
Region	Date	Ref.
United Kingdom	1 October 1971 (EP)	
Europe	December 1971	
United Kingdom	February 1972 (re-release)	
United States	11 April 1972	
United States	1 May 1972 (re-release)	

== Chart history ==
=== Weekly charts ===
Chart (1972)	Peak position
Australia (Kent Music Report)	32
Canada RPM Top Singles	5
Ireland (IRMA)	15
Netherlands (Single Top 100)	23
Netherlands (Dutch Top 40)	25
UK Singles (Official Charts)	5
US Billboard Hot 100	5
US Cash Box Top 100	5

=== Year-end charts ===
Chart (1972)	Rank
Canada	76
U.S. Billboard Hot 100	50
U.S. Cash Box	60
