= Liar (Russ Ballard song) =

Single by Three Dog Night

from the album Naturally
- B-side: "Can't Get Enough of It"
- Released: July 1971
- Recorded: 1970
- Genre: Rock
- Length: 3:56 (album version from "Naturally"); 3:04 (edited album version from "Joy To The World"); 3:18 (single mix)
- Label: Dunhill
- Songwriter: Russ Ballard
- Producer: Richard Podolor

Three Dog Night singles chronology
"Joy to the World" (1971)	"Liar" (1971)	"An Old Fashioned Love Song" (1971)

"Liar" is a song written by Russ Ballard of Argent from the 1970 album Argent. It was released as the band's first single, but did not chart.

A version by Three Dog Night was released the following year and was featured on the band's album, Naturally. It was the follow-up to the biggest hit of the band's career, "Joy to the World." Danny Hutton delivered the lead vocal and Richard Podolor was the producer. In the U.S., "Liar" reached number 7 on the Billboard chart. In Canada, the song peaked at number 4 in 1971.

== Other famous versions ==
- Graham Bonnet released a version of the song as a single in June 1981 that reached number 51 on the UK Singles Chart. It was included on his 1981 album, Line-Up.
