= Bob Henrit =

English drummer (born 1944)

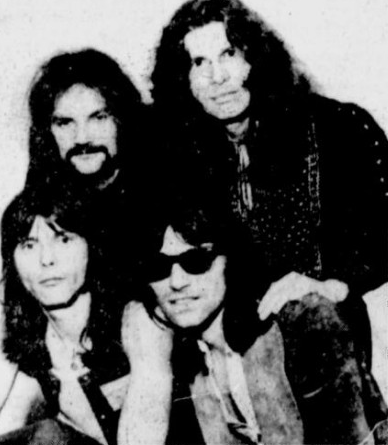
- Henrit (bottom left) as a member of Argent

Background information
- Born: Robert John Henrit; 2 May 1944 (age 82); Broxbourne, Hertfordshire, England
- Genres: Rock
- Occupation: Musician
- Instrument: Drums
- Formerly of: Buster Meikle & The Daybreakers; Unit 4 + 2; the Roulettes; Argent; The Kinks

Robert John Henrit (born 2 May 1944) is an English drummer. He has been a notable member of several musical groups, including Buster Meikle & The Daybreakers, Unit 4 + 2, the Roulettes, Argent and The Kinks.

== Biography ==
Robert John Henrit was born in Broxbourne, Hertfordshire, England on 2 May 1944. He first played washboard as a teen, progressing to a borrowed drum kit and left school at 17 with his parents' blessing to pursue a distinguished music career. He was originally the drummer with Buster Meikle & the Day Breakers, together with Russ Ballard on guitar and Roy Ballard, Russ's older brother, on piano.

His neighbour, Harry Webb (who would later perform under the stagename Cliff Richard) introduced him to the Roulettes (1962–1967), gaining initial professional success with them. They had their own recording career and also backed popular music singer, Adam Faith, both on tour and on Acetate. After the demise of the Roulettes, Henrit briefly (1968) toured, including the US with Unit 4 + 2, their association dated back to his session drumming on their biggest hit, "Concrete and Clay" (1965).

Henrit teamed up with Russ Ballard, Jim Rodford and Rod Argent in late 1968, to form Argent, and remained with them until the band ended in 1976. After a brief spell with Rodford and John Verity as Phoenix, Henrit's post-Argent career included work with a number of artists, including Charlie, after their 1978 tour opening for The Kinks, and Ian Matthews.

As a session drummer, he worked with many solo albums by notable band lead singers including the Who vocalist, Roger Daltrey, and was present on Dave Davies' Glamour (1981) and Chosen People (1983) solo albums. He also worked regularly with the GB Blues Band which, in addition to Rodford, included former members of the Mike Cotton Sound. In a 1972 interview, Keith Moon identified Henrit as one of his favourite drummers.

Henrit replaced the long-serving drummer of the Kinks, Mick Avory, after Avory's departure in 1984. He worked with the act until their split in 1996. Henrit toured with the re-formed Argent intermittently between 2010 and 2013 and occasionally deputises for Mick Avory in the Kast Off Kinks.

Henrit published his autobiography, Banging On, in November 2013 and collaborated with Nigel Constable in writing, The Hayman Drum Book. He would also regularly write for the Music Express.

He owned Henrit's Drum Store on Wardour Street, customers included many leading drummers of the time, Ringo Starr purchased a drum kit, a gift for his son, paying in cash, recalls Henrit. It came about when Henrit had flown to the Sweet Silence Studios in Copenhagen to play drums on Ringo's album and enquired of him, whether the Drum Store was still going. Henrit participated in the 2021, Netflix movie, documentary, Count Me In.

Henrit is married, and has three children. He currently resides in the Forty Hill area of Enfield.

== See also ==
- List of drummers
