= Jim Rodford =

English musician (1941–2018)

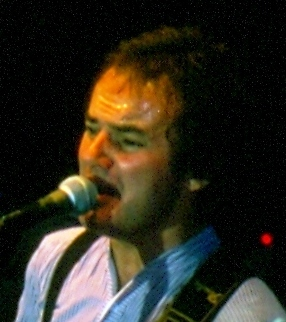
- Rodford performing live in 1979

Background information
- Born: James Walter Rodford; 7 July 1941; St Albans, Hertfordshire, England
- Died: 20 January 2018 (aged 76) St Albans, Hertfordshire, England
- Genres: Rock; progressive rock; psychedelic rock
- Occupation: Musician
- Instruments: Bass; vocals
- Years active: 1960s–2018

James Walter Rodford (7 July 1941 – 20 January 2018) was an English musician, who played bass for several British rock bands. He was a founding member of Argent, which was led by his cousin Rod Argent, and performed with them from their formation in 1969 until they disbanded in 1976. He was the bassist for the Kinks from 1978 until they disbanded in 1997. In 2004, he joined the reunited Zombies, whom he had been closely associated with since the early 1960s, and remained a member until his death in 2018. He was also a member of the Swinging Blue Jeans and the Kast Off Kinks.

== Early years ==
Rodford was born on 7 July 1941, in St Albans, Hertfordshire, England. In the late 1950s and early 1960s he was a member of the Bluetones, the biggest band in St Albans at the time. Although he did not become a band member at this stage, Rodford was instrumental in helping his younger cousin Rod Argent form the Zombies in 1964. Rodford later joined the Mike Cotton Sound as a bassist.⠀

== Music career ==
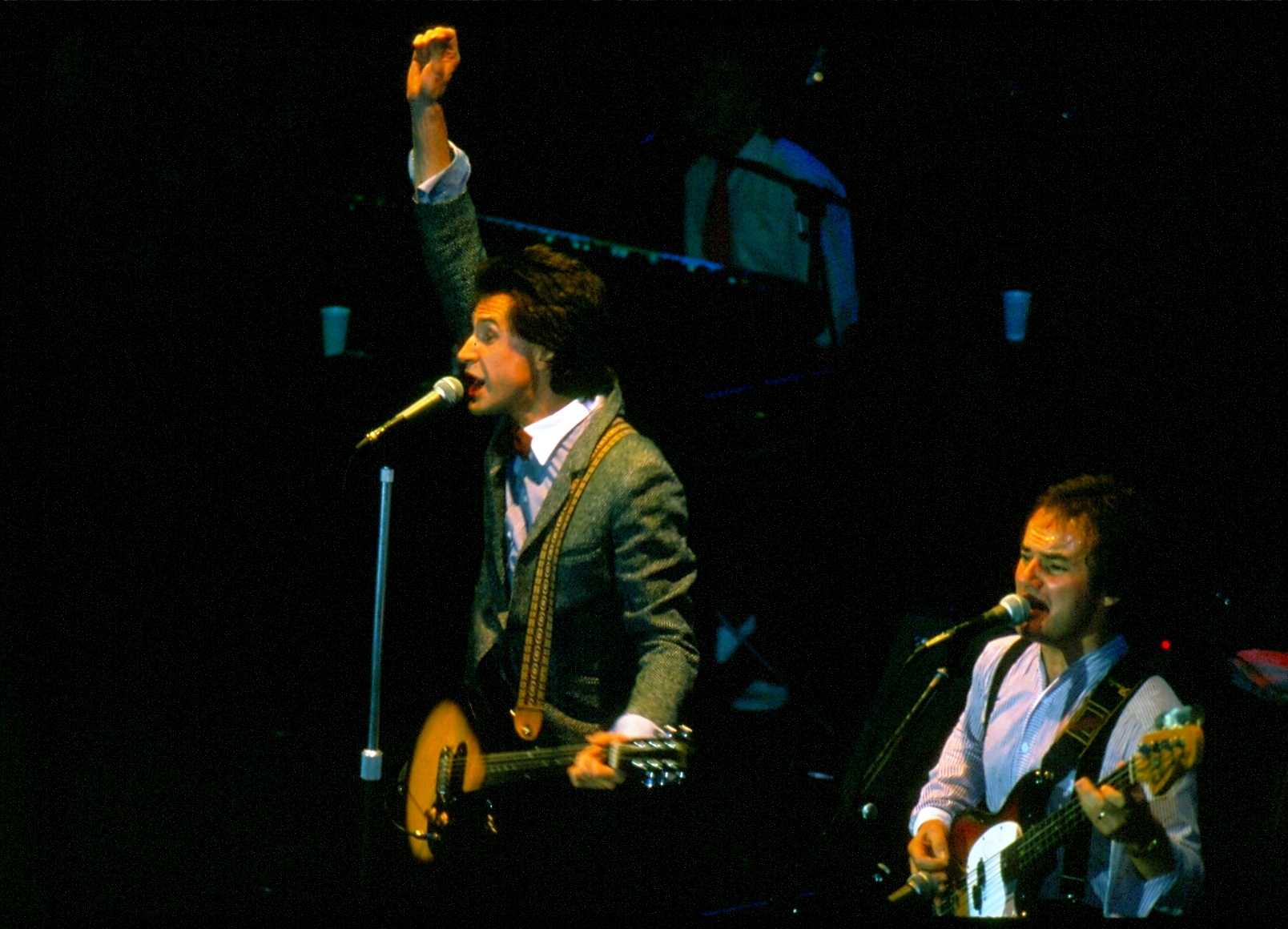
Rodford performing in Mannheim, Germany in 1979 with the Kinks. Ray Davies (L) and Rodford

Along with Rod Argent, Rodford was one of the founding members of Argent. When Rod Argent quit the band, the remaining three members (Rodford, Bob Henrit, and John Verity) formed the short-lived band Phoenix. Eventually, Rodford joined the Kinks as a bass guitarist in 1978 and played with them until their final disintegration in 1997.

From 1999 to 2001 Rodford appeared in a band that ex-Animals guitarist Hilton Valentine formed, the Animals II, which also featured former Animals drummer John Steel, and keyboardist Dave Rowberry. Rodford continued with this band (which changed its working name to "The Animals and Friends" after Valentine left) until joining Argent and Colin Blunstone in the revival of the Zombies.

Rodford never played with the Zombies during their original incarnation, despite having been closely involved with them. However, he began to play with them in the band's reincarnation in 1968 and again in the early years of the 21st century, with his son Steve on drums.

In 2008, Rodford joined the Kast Off Kinks, on the retirement of John Dalton, whom he had followed into the Kinks after Andy Pyle. In 2009, Jim Rodford regularly played in "The Rodford Files" along with his sons Steve Rodford (Blunstone/Argent band) on drums and Russ Rodford on guitar, plus Derik Timms (mOOn Dogs) on guitar, lap steel, slide and vocals.

In 2010, the original line-up of Argent reformed and resumed playing in concert. They mounted a short tour including gigs in Frome, Southampton, Wolverhampton, Leamington Spa and London.

On 20 January 2018, Rodford died after he fell down stairs at his home in St Albans.

== Personal life ==
Rodford met his wife, Jean, at the Pioneer Club, St Albans, in the early days of his music career. They have two sons, Steve, a drummer, Russell a guitarist and a daughter, Paula. Rodford and his wife are one of the couples who get name-dropped in the Zombies 1967 single "Friends of Mine". Rodford died after a fall on 20 January 2018, at the age of 76, a few days after returning from America where he had played a few gigs with the Zombies. His son Steve is currently the drummer for the Zombies.
