= Russ Ballard =

English musician (born 1945)

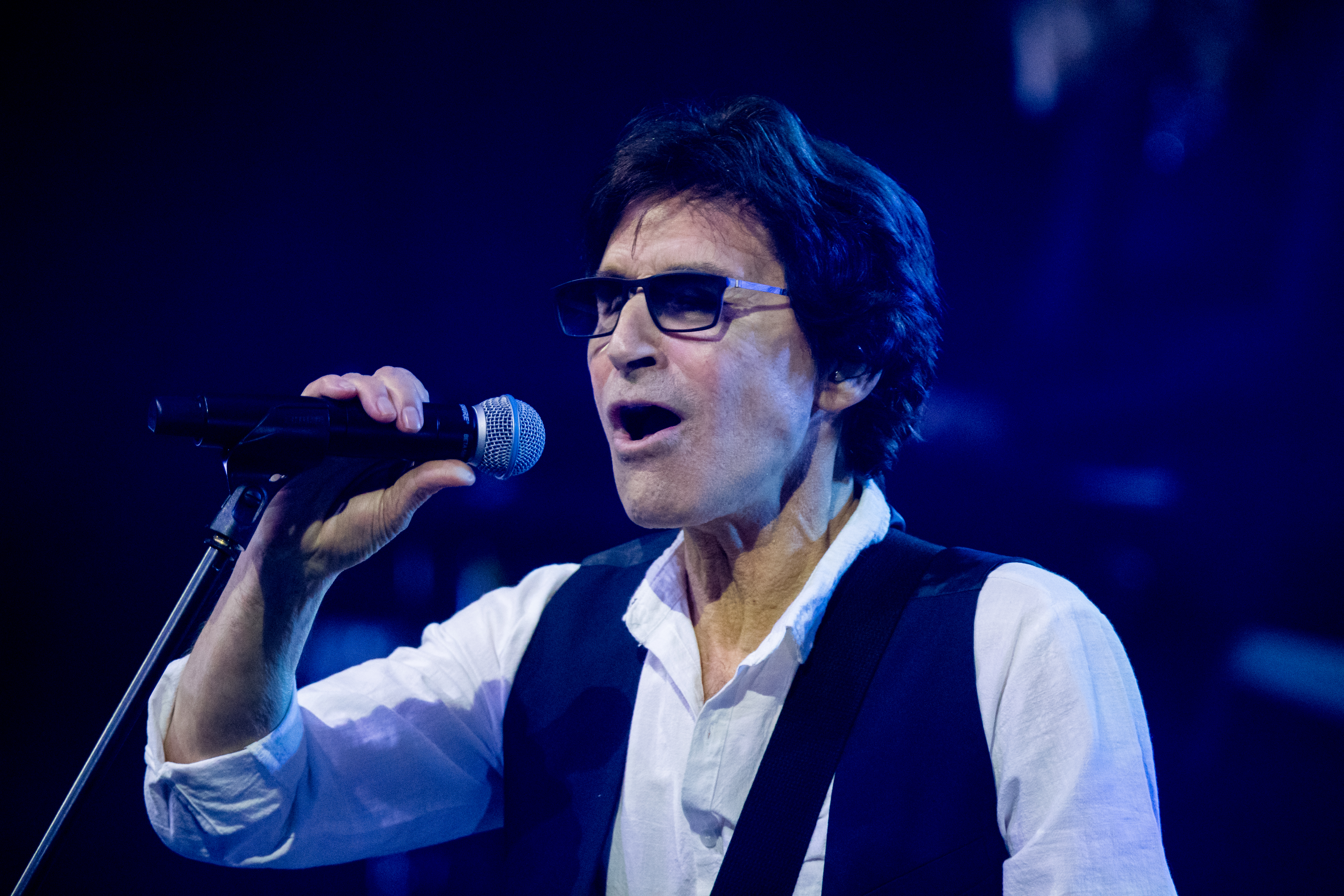
- Ballard performing at the Donau Arena in Regensburg, Germany, April 2024

Background information
- Born: Russell Glyn Ballard; 31 October 1945 (age 80); Waltham Cross, Hertfordshire, England
- Genres: Rock; pop; hard rock
- Occupations: Musician; songwriter; record producer
- Instruments: Guitar; vocals; piano; keyboards; harmonica
- Years active: 1960–present
- Label: EMI
- Website: russballardmusic.com

Russell Glyn Ballard (born 31 October 1945) is an English rock singer, guitarist, songwriter and producer. Originally rising to prominence as the lead singer and guitarist of the band Argent, Ballard became a prolific songwriter and producer by the late 1970s. His compositions "New York Groove", "You Can Do Magic", "Since You Been Gone", "I Surrender", "Liar", "Winning", "I Know There's Something Going On", "Can't Shake Loose", "So You Win Again", "No More the Fool" and "God Gave Rock and Roll to You" became hits for other artists during the 1970s and 1980s. He also scored several minor hits under his own name in the early and mid-1980s.

== Early life ==
Russell Glyn Ballard was born on 31 October 1945 in Waltham Cross, Hertfordshire in England.

== Career ==
Ballard was initially a guitarist, joining Buster Meikle & The Day Breakers in 1961 together with his older brother Roy and their friend the drummer Bob Henrit. After a stint with The Roulettes, backing Adam Faith, he joined Unit 4 + 2 in 1967, before becoming the lead singer and guitarist of Argent (along with Henrit, who joined as drummer), writing their hit "God Gave Rock and Roll to You", which later was covered by both Petra and KISS. Ballard is most well known as the vocalist on Argent's smash "Hold Your Head Up". In 1972, Ballard performed on Colin Blunstone's album Ennismore, which was produced by Chris White. Ballard also wrote the hit single "I Don't Believe in Miracles", which featured on that album.

=== Songwriting ===
Ballard left Argent in 1974 and pursued a solo and songwriting career. He wrote such hits as Three Dog Night's "Liar" (originally recorded by Argent), Hot Chocolate's 1977 UK chart topper "So You Win Again", and Rainbow's hits "Since You Been Gone" (UK number 6 in 1979) and "I Surrender" (UK number 3 in 1981). Head East had recorded Since You Been Gone in 1978 for their self-titled album, and before that it was included on Ballard's 1976 solo album Winning.

Ballard wrote and performed on Roger Daltrey's first two solo albums, Daltrey (1973) and Ride a Rock Horse (1975). Daltrey recorded some other Russ Ballard originals for his McVicar soundtrack, and his albums Under a Raging Moon and Can't Wait to See the Movie. Ballard undertook a tour with Roger Daltrey in 1985, playing guitar and singing one of his own songs. British pop band Hello recorded Ballard's "New York Groove" in 1975, reaching No. 7 in Germany and No. 9 in the UK. "New York Groove" would also be recorded three years later by Ace Frehley, who turned the tune into a stateside hit.

Ballard also wrote the No. 17, 1981 hit for Santana, called "Winning", which appeared on their album entitled Zebop! and had previously been released by Ballard himself on his second solo album. To promote the Winning album he toured Europe and the US in October and November 1976, working with the John Stanley Media Management Company and a four-piece band, performing at large theatre venues in Europe and medium-sized clubs such as The Bottom Line in New York and the Whisky a Go Go in Los Angeles.

Ballard wrote and produced "You Can Do Magic" for the group America on its 1982 album View from the Ground. The single climbed to No. 8 on the Billboard Hot 100 in October 1982, and helped resurrect the band's career. The following year, America brought in Ballard to produce their follow-up album, Your Move. One of its tracks, "The Border", which was co-written by Ballard with Dewey Bunnell, reached No. 33 on the Billboard Hot 100.

Ballard wrote ABBA singer Anni-Frid Lyngstad's 1982 solo hit: "I Know There's Something Going On" (which was produced by Phil Collins, and also featured Collins on drums). The track reached No. 13 on the Billboard Hot 100 and number 5 in Germany. He also penned "Can't Shake Loose" for fellow ABBA former member Agnetha Fältskog, which peaked at No. 29 in the same listings.

Ballard wrote "No More the Fool" recorded by Elkie Brooks, which reached number five in the UK chart in 1987. Returning to a harder rock vein, he wrote "I Did It For Love", which became the last Billboard Hot 100 hit for Night Ranger, appearing on their 1988 Man in Motion album. In 1991 the song he co-wrote with John Waite and Jonathan Cain, "So This Is Eden", appeared on Bad English's album, Backlash.

Ballard in 2005, acting as a talent scout, "discovered" Lauren Harris.

=== Solo recordings ===
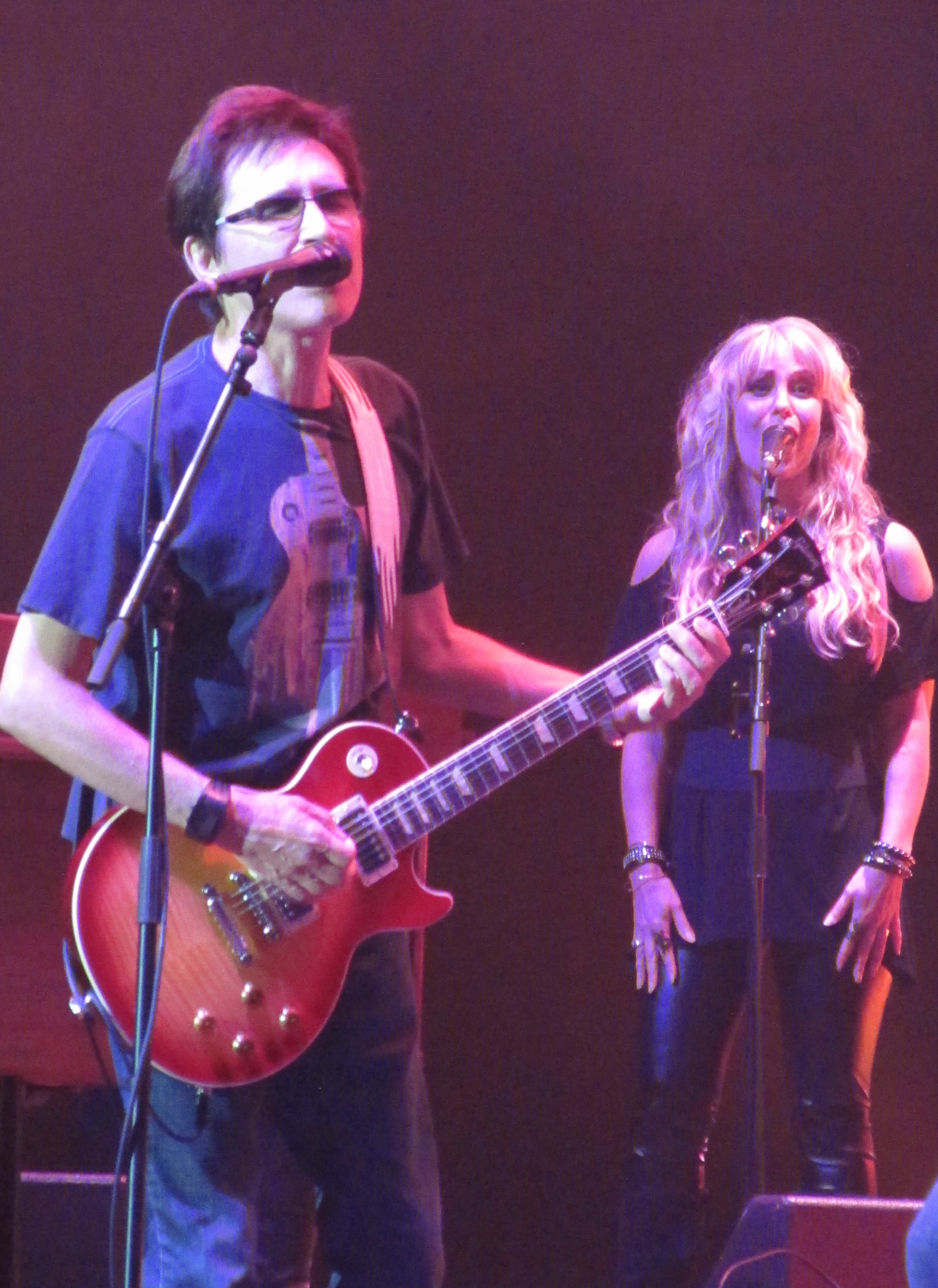
Ballard performing at the 2017 Stone Free Festival at the O2 in London

As a solo artist, Ballard charted once on the US Billboard Hot 100 chart, when "On the Rebound" reached No. 58 in 1980. The song was featured on his solo album for Epic, entitled Barnet Dogs, which reached number 187 on the Billboard 200. English rock band Uriah Heep covered "On the Rebound" in 1982 on their album Abominog.

Another notable solo hit, "Voices" – from his second self-titled album (1984) – was featured in the Miami Vice episode "Calderone's Return: Part 2 – Calderone's Demise", which aired on 26 October 1984. The song was a brief hit on rock radio stations, peaking at No. 15 on the Hot Mainstream Rock Tracks chart. However, "Voices" stalled below the Billboard Hot 100, peaking at No. 110. Another song from the same album, "In the Night" was featured in the episode "Calderone's Return: Part 1 – The Hit List". The show also featured "Your Time Is Gonna Come" by Ballard later in its run.

"The Fire Still Burns", the title track of his 1985 album, matched the placement of the previous year's "Voices", peaking at No. 15 on the Hot Mainstream Rock Tracks chart.

== Ballard and Kiss ==
In addition to Kiss covering "God Gave Rock and Roll to You", it was retitled as "God Gave Rock 'n' Roll to You II."

- Kiss drummer Peter Criss recorded Ballard's "Let Me Rock You" and "Some Kinda Hurricane" on his 1982 Let Me Rock You album.
- Kiss guitarist Ace Frehley covered "New York Groove" on his self-titled solo album in 1978. Frehley's version reached No. 13 on the Billboard Hot 100 chart and has been a regular staple of Kiss live performances during tours in which Frehley has taken part.
- During the time he was not with Kiss, Frehley also recorded a cover of the Ballard song "Into the Night" for his 1987 Frehley's Comet album.

== Ballard songs recorded by other acts ==
- "Can't Shake Loose", recorded by Agnetha Fältskog
- "Can't We Talk It Over", recorded by Les McKeown (1981/1982)
- "Cast The Spirit", recorded by America (1983)
- "Cuckoo" (As "Are You Cuckoo?"), recorded by Bay City Rollers
- "Dancer", recorded by Rare Earth (A Brand New World - 2008)
- "Dream On", recorded by King Kobra (Thrill of a Lifetime - 1986)
- "Feels Like the Real Thing", recorded by Stormbringer (Stormbringer - 1983)
- "First Heartbreak", recorded by Ian Lloyd (Love Stealer - 1979)
- "Free Me", recorded by Roger Daltrey (Soundtrack album of McVicar – 1980)
- "God Gave Rock 'n' Roll to You", recorded by Argent, Petra, and Kiss
- "Heartbreaker", recorded by Olivia Newton-John (‘’Let Me Be There (Non-American Pressing)’’ - 1973)
- "Hearts of Fire", recorded by Roger Daltrey (on his album Can't Wait to See the Movie)
- "I Did It For Love", recorded by Night Ranger (Man In Motion - 1988)
- "I Don't Believe in Miracles", recorded by Colin Blunstone
- "I Know There's Something Going On", recorded by Frida
- "I Surrender", recorded by Head East, Rainbow, Cherie & Marie Currie, At Vance, Stratovarius and Praying Mantis
- "I Will Be There", recorded by Gogmagog
- "I'm Confessing", recorded by Alan Longmuir (Single A-side, 1977)
- "I'm the One Who Loves You", recorded by A II Z (Single A-side, 1981)
- "Into the Night", recorded by Frehley's Comet. (Frehley's Comet - 1987)
- "Is Anybody There", recorded by E. F. Band (Deep Cut – 1982)
- "Is My Love In Vain", recorded by Nick Simper's Fandango (Future Times - 1980)
- "Jody", recorded by America
- "Juliet", recorded by Girl (Killing Time – 1997)
- "Just a Dream Away", recorded by Roger Daltrey (Soundtrack album of McVicar – 1980)
- "Just Another Day", recorded by Phoenix, Nick Simper's Fandango(Slipstreaming - 1979)
- "Let It Rock", recorded by Hello (1977)
- "Let Me Rock You", recorded by Peter Criss (Let Me Rock You - 1982)
- "Liar", recorded by Argent, Three Dog Night, Graham Bonnet and Rick Medlocke & Blackfoot
- "Livin' in Suspicion", recorded by the Graham Bonnet Band (Meanwhile, Back in the Garage – 2018)
- "Lost City", recorded by The Shadows (Sound of the Shadows – 1965)
- "Love Is a Game", recorded by Girl and E. F. Band
- "My Time Is Gonna Come", recorded by Roger Daltrey (Soundtrack album of McVicar – 1980)
- "New York Groove", recorded by Hello, Ace Frehley and Sweet
- "No More the Fool", recorded by Elkie Brooks
- "Nowhere to Run", recorded by Santana
- "On the Rebound", recorded by Uriah Heep (Abominog – 1982)
- "Panic Attack", recorded by Bert Heerink (Better Yet – 2009).
- "Prove It", recorded by Rare Earth (A Brand New World - 2008)
- "Riding with the Angels", recorded by Samson, Heretic, and Bruce Dickinson
- "S.O.S.", recorded by Graham Bonnet (Line-Up - 1981)
- "She's so in love", recorded by The Cats (1985)
- "Since You Been Gone", recorded by Clout, Cherie & Marie Currie, Head East, Rainbow, Alcatrazz, Impellitteri, Crash Kelly, and Brian May
- "So You Win Again", recorded by Hot Chocolate and South African band Copperfield
- "Some Kinda Hurricane", recorded by Peter Criss (Let Me Rock You - 1982)
- "Someday We'll Be Together", recorded by The Pointer Sisters (1981)
- "Star Studded Sham", recorded by Hello (1976)
- "The Border", recorded by America (1983)
- "The Mirror Lies", recorded by Graham Bonnet (My Kingdom Come double single - 2015)
- "Tonight", recorded by Tokyo Blade (Tokyo Blade - 1983)
- "Voices", recorded by Karen Kamon (1987)
- "Winning", recorded by Michael Quatro, Nona Hendryx and later Santana.
- "You Can Do Magic", recorded by America.

== Solo discography ==
=== Studio albums ===
Year	Album details	Peak chart positions		Notes
Year	Album details	US	AUS	Notes
1974	Russ Ballard: Released: September 1974; Label: Epic; Format: LP	–	–	Includes "I Don't Believe in Miracles"
1976	Winning: Released: 1976; Labels: Epic; Format: LP, CD	–	–	Includes "Winning", "Since You Been Gone", and "Just a Dream Away"
1978	At the Third Stroke: Released: 1978; Label: Epic; Format: LP	–	–	Includes "Treat Her Right"
1980	Barnet Dogs: Released: 1980; Labels: Epic; Format: LP, CD	187	–	Includes "On the Rebound" and "Riding with the Angels"
1981	Into the Fire: Released: 1981; Label: Epic; Format: LP	–	–	
1984	Russ Ballard: Released: 1984; Labels: EMI; Format: LP, CD	147	70	Includes "Voices" and "In the Night"
1985	The Fire Still Burns: Released: 1985; Label: EMI; Format: LP	166	–	Includes "The Fire Still Burns" and "Dream On"
1993	The Seer: Released: 1993; Labels: Intercord; Format: LP, CD	–	–	
2006	Book of Love: Released: 20 October 2006; Labels: Phoenix Music Group; Format: CD	–	–	
2015	It's Good to Be Here: Released: 27 March 2015; Labels: UMU Music Group; Format: Download; Label: BMG Rights Management; Format: CD, LP, digital	–	–	First available in 2015 only as digital download via UMU Music Group, Ballard worked on the tracks over many years before its release.; After signing a contract with BMG Rights Management UK Ltd, the album is available as CD, LP, digital; First single (available on major streaming services since 9 December 2019) is "Kicking' the Can"
2025	Songs From The Warehouse/The Hits Re:Wired: Released: 25 April 2025; Labels: Frontiers Records SRL; Format: CD, LP, digital	–	–	Songs From The Warehouse: New material recorded between 2020 and 2025; The Hits Re:Wired: Ballards version of songs he wrote for others

=== Live albums ===
- Book of Love Tour Live 2007 (CD) (10 April 2020), Russell Ballard Ltd.

=== Singles ===
All songs written by Ballard.

Year	A-Side	Length	B-Side	Length	Other
1974	"Fly Away"	3:20	"Danger Zone - Part II"	3:06	
1975	"Loose Women"	2:27	"Danger Zone—Part 1"	2:38	
1976	"Since You Been Gone"	2:50	"Venus (Shine Your Light)"	4:41	
1976	"The Russ Ballard Story Part 1"	7:50	"The Russ Ballard Story Part 2"	7:41	US only, promo
1977	"Some Kinda Hurricane"	3:27	"You Can Do Voodoo"	3:32	
1978	"Dancer"	4:02	"Treat Her Right"	2:29	New Zealand only
1978	"Treat Her Right"	2:55	"What Does It Take"	3:09	
1978	"I'm a Scorpio"	3:38	"Expressway to Your Heart"	2:53	
1980	"Rene Didn't Do It"	3:20	"Feels Like the Real Thing"	3:58	Australia only
1980	"On the Rebound"	3:28	"Riding with the Angels"	4:06	
1981	"Rock & Roll Lover"	3:31	"Breakdown"	3:16	US only
1981	"Here Comes the Hurt"	3:56	"Breakdown"	3:16	
1981	"I Will Be There"	3:57	"Madman"	5:04	
1984	"Two Silhouettes"	4:17	"Living Without You"	4:24	
1984	"I Can't Hear You No More"	4:09	"The Last Time"	5:25	Germany only
1985	"Voices"	5:33	"Living Without You"	4:24	
1985	"The Fire Still Burns"	4:12	"Hold On"	4:17	
1985	"Dream On"	4:15	"The Omen"	4:27	Germany only

=== Charting singles ===
- "On the Rebound" (1980) - No. 58 on Billboard Hot 100
- "Voices" (1984) - No. 110 on Billboard Bubbling Under Hot 100 Singles / No. 15 Top Tracks (Mainstream Rock Tracks)
- "The Fire Still Burns" (1985) - No. 105 on Billboard Bubbling Under Hot 100 Singles / No. 15 Top Rock Tracks (Mainstream Rock Tracks)

== Portrait ==
In 1984, Mary Turner produced a 15-minute portrait of Russ Ballard as a record with the title "A Portrait Of An Artist By Mary Turner".

== See also ==
- List of songs recorded written and produced by Russ Ballard
- List of lead vocalists
