= The Best of the Alan Parsons Project (1983 album) =

Compilation album by The Alan Parsons Project
- Released: 4 November 1983
- Recorded: 1977–1983
- Genre: Progressive rock
- Label: Arista
- Producer: Alan Parsons

The Alan Parsons Project chronology
| Eye in the Sky (1982) | The Best of the Alan Parsons Project (1983) | Ammonia Avenue (1984) |

Singles from The Best of
- 1. "You Don't Believe" Released: 4 November 1983

Professional ratings
Review scores
| Source | Rating |
|---|---|
| Allmusic | 3.5/5 stars |

The Best of the Alan Parsons Project is a 1983 greatest hits compilation by the Alan Parsons Project. In addition, it contained a new song "You Don't Believe", which would be included on the next Project album, Ammonia Avenue. In 1986, it had become the first album of the group to be released in the Soviet Union, although the song "Psychobabble" was removed from it. No songs from Tales of Mystery and Imagination were included, presumably because that album had not been released through Arista.

== Track listing ==
All tracks are written by Alan Parsons and Eric Woolfson.

| No. | Title | Album | Length |
|---|---|---|---|
| 1. | "I Wouldn't Want to Be Like You" (single edit) | I Robot | 3:08 |
| 2. | "Eye in the Sky" | Eye in the Sky | 4:29 |
| 3. | "Games People Play" | The Turn of a Friendly Card | 4:14 |
| 4. | "Time" | The Turn of a Friendly Card | 4:57 |
| 5. | "Pyramania" | Pyramid | 2:40 |
| 6. | "You Don't Believe" | Originally released here, later appeared on Ammonia Avenue | 4:23 |
| 7. | "Lucifer" (single edit) | Eve | 4:05 |
| 8. | "Psychobabble" | Eye in the Sky | 4:48 |
| 9. | "Damned If I Do" (single edit) | Eve | 3:30 |
| 10. | "Don't Let It Show" (single edit) | I Robot | 3:28 |
| 11. | "Can't Take It with You" (single edit) | Pyramid | 4:40 |
| 12. | "Old and Wise" (single edit) | Eye in the Sky | 4:04 |
| Total length: | | | 51:30 |

== Trivia ==
The liner notes mention an "in depth book about the Alan Parsons Project" being prepared for publication in 1984, directing readers to register for advance information and providing a P.O.Box address for the purpose. The book was never published.

== Charts ==
| Chart (1983/84) | Peak position |
|---|---|
| Australia (Kent Music Report) | 25 |
| Canada Top Albums/CDs (RPM) | 49 |
| German Albums (Offizielle Top 100) | 19 |
| New Zealand Albums (RMNZ) | 20 |
| Swiss Albums (Schweizer Hitparade) | 16 |
| UK Albums (Official Charts) | 99 |
| US Billboard 200 | 53 |

== Certifications ==
| Region | Certification | Certified units/sales |
|---|---|---|
| Canada (Music Canada) | Gold | 50,000^{^} |
| New Zealand (RMNZ) | Gold | 7,500^{^} |
| United States (RIAA) | Gold | 500,000^{^} |
^{^} Shipments figures based on certification alone.
