= 12 Classics =

Compilation album by Bryn Haworth
- Released: 1981
- Recorded: 1978 and 1979
- Genre: Folk, Gospel, R&B
- Label: Chapel Lane Records CPS 8008
- Producer: Doug Bennett, Jon Astley and Audie Ashworth

Bryn Haworth chronology
| The Gap (1980) | 12 Classics (1981) | Pass It On (1984) |

12 Classics is the sixth studio album by Bryn Haworth released in 1981 and is a compilation of songs previously released on two of his earlier albums.

== Track listing ==
All music is composed by Bryn Haworth

| No. | Title | Original Album | Length |
|---|---|---|---|
| 1. | "Standing on the Rock" | Keep the Ball Rolling |
| 2. | "First Time" | Keep the Ball Rolling |
| 3. | "Sing to the Lord" | Grand Arrival |
| 4. | "Luxury Liner" | Keep the Ball Rolling |
| 5. | "City Boy" | Keep the Ball Rolling |
| 6. | "We're All One" | Grand Arrival |
| 7. | "Grand Arrival" | Grand Arrival |
| 8. | "Unemployment Blues" | Keep the Ball Rolling |
| 9. | "Let Me Love You" | Keep the Ball Rolling |
| 10. | "Come See What Love Has Done" | Grand Arrival |
| 11. | "Full Day" | Grand Arrival |
| 12. | "Working for Love" | Keep the Ball Rolling |
