= Eye in the sky =

Eye in the sky may refer to:

== Film and TV ==
- Eye in the Sky (2007 film), a Hong Kong espionage and surveillance thriller set in the same city
- Eye in the Sky (2015 film), a British thriller film featuring drone warfare
- Eye in the Sky (TV series), a 2015 TVB drama

== Other ==
- Eye in the Sky (album), an album by the Alan Parsons Project
  - "Eye in the Sky" (song) on this album
- Eye in the sky (camera), a closed-circuit camera in casino jargon
- Eye in the Sky (novel), a 1957 science fiction novel by Philip K. Dick
- "Eye in the Sky", a song by Reks from his album The Greatest X
