= Ennismore (album) =

Studio album by Colin Blunstone
- Released: November 1972
- Studio: Abbey Road Studios, London
- Genre: Rock
- Length: 31:48
- Label: Epic
- Producer: Rod Argent, Chris White

Colin Blunstone chronology
One Year (1971)	Ennismore (1972)	Journey (1974)

Ennismore is the second solo studio album by the English singer Colin Blunstone of rock band the Zombies. The name of the album comes from Ennismore Gardens, a square in Knightsbridge where Blunstone was living; the name being a variant spelling of the island Inishmore.

It was originally released in November 1972 on the label Epic. The lead single "I Don't Believe in Miracles" peaked at No. 31 on the UK Singles Chart, and "How Could We Dare to Be Wrong" peaked No. 45. Ennismore was reissued on CD by Sony in 2003.

As with Blunstone's 1971 debut album One Year, Ennismore was produced by Rod Argent and Chris White and most of the songs were backed by Argent's band Argent.

== Critical reception ==
Professional ratings
Review scores
Source	Rating
AllMusic	4/5 stars
The Encyclopedia of Popular Music	5/5 stars

Robin Platts of AllMusic retrospectively wrote, "Opinions differ as to which of the two is Blunstone's best album, but both One Year and Ennismore are consistently strong records and are bound to please anyone who has enjoyed Colin's work with the Zombies."

== Track listing ==
1. "I Don't Believe in Miracles" (Russ Ballard) – 3:03
2. "Quartet: Exclusively for Me" (Colin Blunstone, David Jones) – 2:30
3. "Quartet: A Sign from Me to You" (Blunstone) – 3:58
4. "Quartet: Every Sound I Heard" (Blunstone, David Jones) – 2:26
5. "Quartet: How Wrong Can One Man Be" (Blunstone) – 2:02
6. "I Want Some More" (Blunstone) – 3:08
7. "Pay Me Later" (Blunstone, Phil Dennys) – 2:46
8. "Andorra" (Rod Argent, Chris White) – 3:18
9. "I've Always Had You" (Blunstone) – 2:32
10. "Time's Running Out" (Blunstone) – 2:41
11. "How Could We Dare to Be Wrong" (Blunstone, Phil Dennys) – 3:24

== Personnel ==
- Colin Blunstone – vocals; guitar
- Rod Argent – piano; keyboards
- Russ Ballard – guitar; piano; keyboards
- Steve Bingham – bass guitar
- Jim Rodford – bass guitar
- Robert Henrit – drums
- Byron Lye Foot – drums
- Jim Toomey – drums
- Terry Poole – drums; bass guitar
- Phil Dennys – piano; keyboards
- Pete Wingfield – piano; keyboards
- Derek Griffiths – guitar
- Michael Snow – guitar; keyboards

Production

- Rod Argent – producer
- Chris White – producer
- Peter Vince – engineer
- Steve Campbell – cover photography
- Chris Gunning – string arrangements
- Dan Loggins – adviser
- David Lowe – photography
