= Wings of the Morning =

Wings of the Morning may refer to:

- Wings of the Morning (1919 film), a 1919 American silent drama film directed by J. Gordon Edwards
- Wings of the Morning (1937 film), a 1937 British drama film directed by Harold D. Schuster
- Wings of the Morning (album), a 1984 album by Bryn Haworth
- The Wings of the Morning, a book by Tom Tryon, 1990
