= The Best of the Alan Parsons Project =

The Best of the Alan Parsons Project is the name of two albums:

- The Best of the Alan Parsons Project (1983 album)
- The Best of the Alan Parsons Project (2002 album)
