= The Miserable Rich =

English Band

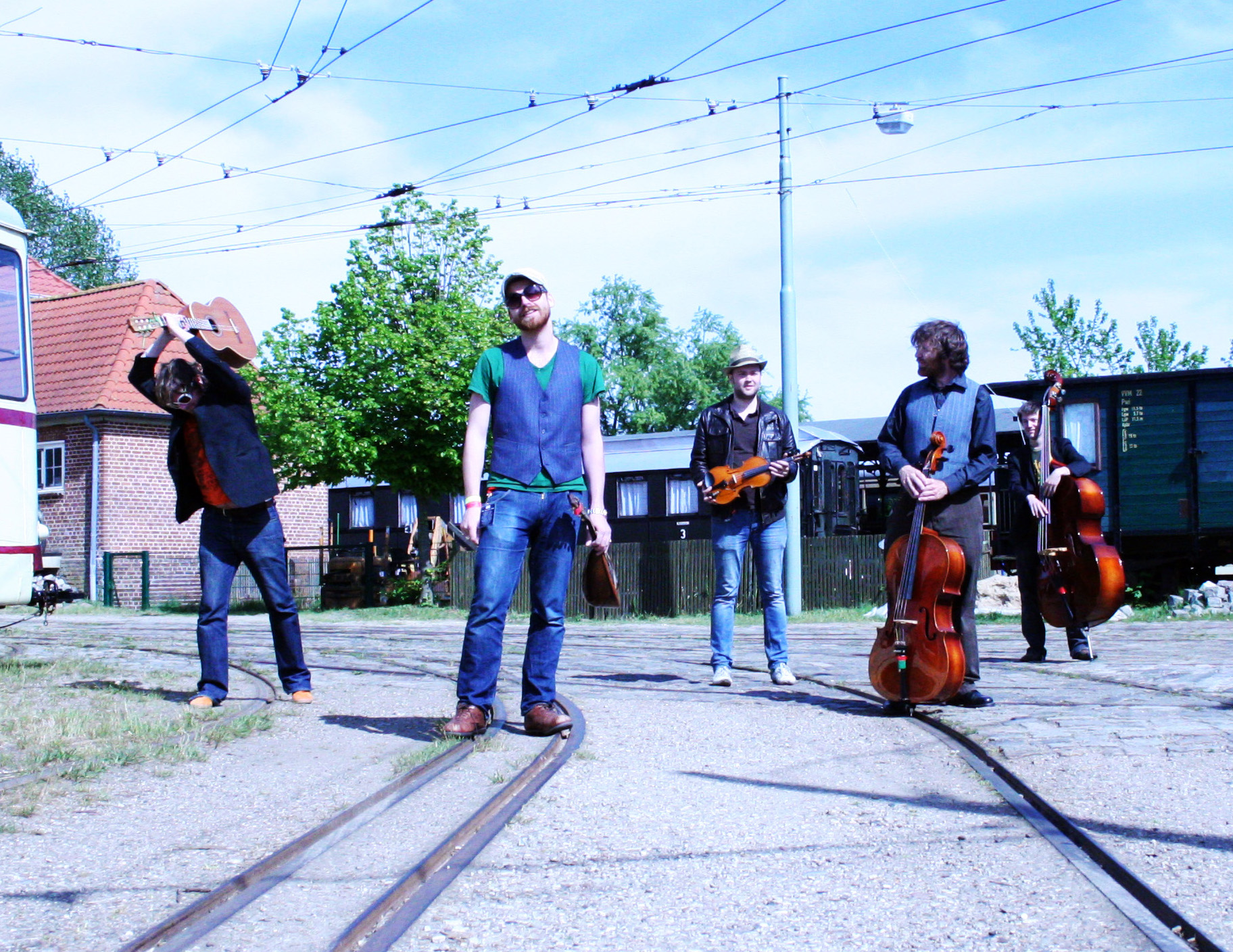

Background information
- Origin: Brighton, England
- Years active: 2007–2012 (hiatus); 2018–present
- Labels: Hazelwood Vinyl Plastics (formerly); Humble Soul (formerly); Rags to Ruin Records
- Members: William Calderbank; James de Malplaquet; Mike Siddell; Jim Briffett; Rhys Lovell; Martin Deering
- Past members: Ricky Pritchard
- Website: themiserablerich.com

The Miserable Rich are a string-led band, formed in 2007 and based in Brighton, England. The band has a chamber orchestra sound, created using cello and violin as the primary lead instruments, augmented by double bass, acoustic guitar and occasionally piano. They have released four studio albums: Twelve Ways to Count (2008), Of Flight & Fury (2010), Miss You in the Days (2011) and Overcome (2024); and a live album, Live in Frankfurt (2014) with a bonus disc of covers.

The band's name came from an experience Will Calderbank, Mike Siddell and James de Malplaquet had at the wedding of two rich aristocrats in Rome.

== History ==
In 2006, Will Calderbank (cello) joined James de Malplaquet (vocals) to form the band Grape Authority, a live band playing the songs de Malplaquet had written under the pseudonym James Grape. The pair were playing in Brighton folk band Shoreline, and the more traditional instrumentation used in this band was taken on board, with inspiration derived from the ex-Zombie Colin Blunstone's "Say You Don't Mind" and The Balanescu Quartet's Kraftwerk covers. Together with Mike Siddell (formerly of Hope of the States) on violin, Jim Briffett on guitar and Rhys Lovell playing double bass, they created The Miserable Rich.

They recorded their debut album, Twelve Ways to Count, at de Malplaquet's house in Hove during the summer of 2007. The debut single from the album received positive reviews, including Leftfield Single of the Month in DJ Magazine and widespread airplay. The album itself has received widespread critical acclaim, both in Germany and the UK, with the NME describing it as ‘heartbreakingly beautiful’. It was made album of the day on BBC 6 Music, and the band have been championed in particular by Marc Riley, for whom they have recorded three live sessions. They have also recorded sessions for BBC Radio 2's Dermot O'Leary, Mark Lamarr and the BBC Radio 4 institution Loose Ends, as well as numerous European radio stations and TV channels.

In November 2009 they released an EP of cover versions, featuring four reworked 1980s songs: "Golden Brown" by The Stranglers, "Gigantic" by Pixies, "Shades" by Iggy Pop and "Sweet Dreams (Are Made of This)" by Eurythmics.

The Miserable Rich self-recorded and produced their second album, Of Flight & Fury, which was mixed by Al Scott, who had previously worked with The Levellers, Eliza Carthy and Asian Dub Foundation, and released in June 2010.

The third Miserable Rich album, Miss You in the Days, released in November 2011, is lyrically based on ghost stories. It was recorded on location at various buildings around the UK that are reputedly haunted, primarily Blickling Hall in Norfolk, commonly considered the most haunted stately home in the UK. The album again received critical acclaim, with Mark Beaumont writing that it "deserves a Mercury nod".

They have toured extensively in Europe, both as headliners and as support for Isobel Campbell and Mark Lanegan, with some dates in the US leading up to SXSW.

In late 2012 The Miserable Rich announced their final concerts in London and Brighton, pending a creative break during which time members of the band would concentrate on other projects. However, they released a Christmas single in 2013 titled "Everything You Wanted". In November 2014, their live album Live in Frankfurt was released featuring music from their gig at the city on 9 February 2012.

In 2018, the band reformed to play a benefit concert—KitFest—for the charity de Malplaquet and his wife Sarah set up after the tragic death of their first son at 13 days. The charity—Kit Tarka Foundation—aimed to reduce infant mortality through research and education, funding the first study into neonatal death by HSV in the UK for over 25 years. James and Sarah spoke to the national press and Channel 5 news, and raised money and awareness through various sponsored events and partnerships.

Through Covid and various difficult times for members, the band sought solace in each other and in writing again. A new single—"Glue"—the song written for KitFest—was scheduled to be released in August 2023. Their fourth studio album, Overcome, was released in February 2024.

== Discography ==
- Twelve Ways to Count (2008, Humble Soul)
- Covers EP (2009, Humble Soul)
- Of Flight & Fury (2010, Humble Soul)
- Miss You in the Days (2011, Humble Soul / Hazelwood Records)
- Miss You More EP (2012)
- Live in Frankfurt (2014)
- Overcome (2024, Rags To Ruin)
