= The Broken Broadcast =

UK musical group

- Origin: Teesside, England, UK
- Genres: Folk, lo-fi
- Years active: 2009–present
- Label: Pilot
- Members: James Riggall; Emma Riggall (née Reeve); Grizzo Hughes; Snowy; Alexandria Readman
- Past members: Mark Davies; Jonathan Snowball; Caz Reilly
- Website: www.thebrokenbroadcast.co.uk

The Broken Broadcast are a British lo-fi folk band, originally consisting of James Riggall vocals and acoustic guitar, Emma Riggall (née Reeve) drums, Grizzo Hughes bass and Carolyn Reilly violin. The band released their first full-length album, Soya Milk Sea with Pilot Records, in 2010, gaining underground media attention from The Northern Line and Suitcase Orchestra. They have played various types of shows through the North of UK in 2010 including the Stockton International Riverside Festival and supported acts such as Stornoway and The Miserable Rich. They also performed live BBC Radio Tees in March and October.

Soya Milk Sea was recorded in a friend's basement and was restricted to few copies, mostly passed on to friends and music venues.

== Musical style ==
Their style is characterized by delayed guitars and percussion efforts with comfortable and subtle vocals, often in harmonistic fashion, and often compared to a stripped down Grizzly Bear.

== Discography ==
=== Studio albums ===
- Soya Milk Sea – Pilot Records – 2010
- How Not To Cut A Buffalo – Bear Love Records – 2013
