= Pass It On =

Pass It On may refer to:

== Music ==
- Pass It On (Bryn Haworth album), 1984
- Pass It On (Dave Holland album), 2008
- Pass It On (Douwe Bob album), 2015
- "Pass It On" (song), a 2003 song by The Coral

== Other ==
- Pass It On (play), a play by New Zealand playwright Renée
- Pass It On, an advertising campaign by The Foundation for a Better Life
- Pass It On, play by Doug Lucie
