= Journey (Colin Blunstone album) =

Studio album by Colin Blunstone
- Released: 1974
- Recorded: Abbey Road Studios, London
- Genre: Rock
- Label: Epic
- Producer: Chris White

Colin Blunstone chronology
Ennismore (1972)	Journey (1974)	Planes (1976)

Professional ratings
Review scores
Source	Rating
Allmusic	4/5 stars
Encyclopedia of Popular Music	3/5 stars

Journey is the third album by singer Colin Blunstone, former member of the British rock band The Zombies. It was released in 1974 (see 1974 in music).

== Track listing ==
All tracks composed by Colin Blunstone; except where indicated

1. "Wonderful" (Rod Argent, Chris White)
2. "Beginning"
3. "Keep the Curtains Closed Today"
4. "Weak for You" (Pete Wingfield)
5. "Beware" (Argent, White)
6. "Smooth Operation" (Pete Wingfield)
7. "This is Your Captain Calling" (Richard Kerr, Gary Osborne)
8. "Something Happens When You Touch Me" (Blunstone, Richard Kerr)
9. "Setting Yourself Up"
10. "Brother Lover" (Blunstone, Richard Kerr)
11. "Shadow of a Doubt" (Pete Wingfield)

== Personnel ==
- Colin Blunstone – vocals, acoustic guitar
- Rod Argent – piano, keyboards and co-producer on "Beware"
- Duncan Browne – classical guitar
- Derek Griffiths – guitar, backing vocals
- Richard Kerr – piano on "This is Your Captain Speaking"
- Pete Wingfield – keyboards, backing vocals
- Terry Poole – drums
- Jim Toomey – drums
- John Beecham – horn
- Michael Cotton – horn
- Nick Newall – horn
- The King's Singers – chorus on tracks 1–3
- Chris Gunning – chorus director
- Pip Williams – orchestral arrangements

Production notes:

- Chris White – producer
- Peter Vince – engineer
- Mike Ross – engineer
- Simon Cantwell, Mark Vigars – artwork
