= Orange Bicycle =

English band

Orange Bicycle was an English psychedelic pop band, which existed between 1967 and 1971. The band played a style influenced by The Beach Boys, The Beatles, The Rolling Stones, and the hippie counter culture. Previously, they acted as support, and backing band for the duo Paul and Barry Ryan as well as completing sessions for other vocalists, recording over 100 BBC Radio One sessions and appearing on UK TV.

== Line-up ==
- Robert F Scales lead singer (under his stage name Robb Storme)
- John Bachini (bass, guitar, vocals)
- Kevin Currie (drums)
- Bernie Lee (guitar, vocals)
- Wilson Malone (keyboards, drums, vocals)

== Career ==
Starting life as a skiffle group from Crouch End, North London in 1959, the start of the rock 'n' roll movement at the 2 I's and other coffee bars in Soho, convinced the group to move to electric guitars and drums becoming 'Robb Storme and the Whispers' in the transition.

In 1960 the group won a recording contract with Decca having impressed at a competition called the Soho Fair. The group recorded several singles for the label without much success and they continued to tour the UK

Early members of the group were Robb Scales (lead vocals) Jim St. Pier (saxophone) Chuck Hardy (guitar) Gary Hooper (bass) and Lewis Collins (bass) who later went on to gain fame in the TV series The Professionals.

The group continued to tour throughout the sixties recording singles for Columbia and Piccadilly and toured Colleges and Universities in the UK in 1964, Robb Storme and the Whispers were the first rock/pop band to play behind the Iron Curtain, touring Poland with Helen Shapiro. Later as fashions changed they morphed into The Robb Storme Group. In 1966 they covered the Beach Boys track, "Here Today". Finally when the psychedelic revolution arrived they renamed to Orange Bicycle. The first single from Orange Bicycle, "Hyacinth Threads", was a record chart #1 hit single in France, and quite successful in some other European countries. It was their best known recording, and has appeared on numerous compilations.

In 1968 the band started to cover The Rolling Stones' "Sing This Song All Together". The same year they performed at the Isle of Wight Festival on a line-up that included Jefferson Airplane, The Move, T-Rex, Fairport Convention, The Crazy World of Arthur Brown and The Pretty Things. In July 1969, they appeared on BBC Two's television programme, Colour Me Pop. Their most successful album, Orange Bicycle, included covers of "Carry That Weight", "Tonight I'll Be Staying Here With You", "Say You Don't Mind" and "Take Me to the Pilot".

Finally, in 1970, the band released their first LP entitled The Orange Bicycle but the psychedelic style was considered out of fashion.

The band broke up in 1971.

== Subsequent careers ==
Malone released a solo album as "Wil Malone" on Fontana, and the album Motherlight under the name "Bobak, Jons, Malone" on Morgan Blue Town, featuring Malone on vocals, keyboards and drums with Morgan studio engineers Mike Bobak on guitar and Andy Jons (Johns) as recording engineer. Malone went on to become a successful arranger and record producer. His string arrangement for The Verve's "Bitter Sweet Symphony" caused controversy.

Currie joined Supertramp, then Burlesque, later becoming a session musician.

John Bachini (also known as John Baccini, John Bacchini and The Wop) carried on as a session bass player and session backing vocalist/producer/engineer. He opened the Wopalong Recording Studios and the Superwop Music Publishers in Luton, Bedfordshire with partner, Don Larking, and produced children's characters and TV formats. In 2004 John Bachini received a large out-of-court settlement from Celador Productions, ITV and five Individuals after claiming one of his game show formats, Millionaire, was plagiarised to create Who Wants to Be a Millionaire?.

== Discography ==
=== Singles ===
- "Hyacinth Threads" / "Amy Peate" (Columbia DB 8259) 1967
- "Laura's Garden" / "Lavender Girl" (Columbia DB 8311) 1967
- "Early Pearly Morning" / "Go with Goldie" (Columbia DB 8352) 1968
- "Jenskadajka" / "Nicely" (Columbia DB 8413) 1968
- "Sing This Song All Together" / "Trip on An Orange Bicycle" (Columbia DB 8483) 1968
- "Last Cloud Home" / "Tonight I'll Be Staying Here" (Parlophone R 5789) 1969
- ""Carry That Weight-You Never Give Me Your Money" / "Want To B Side" (Parlophone R 5811) 1970
- "Take Me to the Pilot" / "It's Not My World" (Parlophone R 5829) 1970
- "Jelly on the Bread" / "Make It Rain" (Parlophone R 5854) 1970
- "Goodbye Stranger" / "Country Comforts" (Regal Zonophone RZ 3029) 1971

=== Albums ===
- The Orange Bicycle (Parlophone PCS 7108) 1970
- Hyacinth Threads: The Morgan Blue Town Recordings (Edsel MEDCD 688) 2001 (double album compilation)
