= Let the Days Go By =

Studio album by Bryn Haworth
- Released: 1974
- Recorded: July, September, October 1973; March 1974
- Studio: Island, London
- Genre: Folk, Gospel, R&B
- Label: Island ILPS 9287
- Producer: Bryn Haworth, Richard Digby Smith, John Porter

Bryn Haworth chronology
Let the Days Go By (1974)	Sunny Side of the Street (1975)

I Won't Lie Sample
An audio sample of "I Won't Lie (This Time)" (1974)

Let the Days Go By is the first studio album by British singer-songwriter and guitarist Bryn Haworth, released in 1974 by Island Records.

The first song on the album "Grappenhall Rag" was also issued as a single by Island Records (b/w "I Won't Lie (This Time)", Cat No. WIP 6200).

Interviewed in 2009 about the reception given to the album, Haworth recalled: "It was quite positive actually. I think most of the music press found it quite fresh, you know. Back in those days there was an openness to all styles of music; it wasn't as narrow as it is now. And because it was a mix of songs and styles it seemed to please most people."

== Track listing ==
All tracks are written by Bryn Haworth, except where noted

Side one
No.	Title	Writer(s)	Length
1.	"Grappenhall Rag"		2:52
2.	"All I Want"		3:31
3.	"I Won't Lie (This Time)"	Haworth, Zacuto, Tepp	4:16
4.	"Ee I Love You Lass"		2:12
5.	"Miss Swiss"		2:11
6.	"Let the Days Go By"		3:41

Side two
No.	Title	Length
7.	"Get Yourself a Man"	2:45
8.	"Time Has Come"	4:29
9.	"Whims and Ways"	3:14
10.	"All I Need Is a Home"	3:15
11.	"Anywhere You Want to Be"	3:07

== Recording ==
Tracks 1, 2, 3, 4, 5, 9 and 10: March 1974, Island Studios, London
Producer: Bryn Haworth/ Richard Digby Smith
Engineer: Richard Digby Smith
Assistant engineer: Dave Hutchins

Tracks 7 and 8: October 1973, Island Studios, London
Producer: John Porter
Engineer: Phil Ault
("Get Yourself A Man" remixed by Richard Digby Smith)

Track 6: September 1973, Centre Music, Hollywood, California

Track 11: July 1973, Marshall's Ranch, Malibu, California
Engineer: Bryn Haworth

== Musicians ==
- Bryn Haworth – Gibson mandolin (1,7,10), Gibson mandocello (1,5), harmonica (2), 12-string guitar (2,5), acoustic guitar, Harpolek (6), tambourine (7), Leslie slide guitar (7), acoustic slide guitar (7), 12-string slide guitar (11), electric guitars (2,3,8,9) and vocals (1–10)
- Bruce Rowland – drums (1,3,4,5), rola-bola (5), marimbas (5), percussion (1)
- Graham Maitland – Fender piano (1), Wurlitzer piano and accordion (4)
- Gordon "Gordy" Haskell – bass (1,2,4,5,9,10)
- Terry Stannard – drums (2,7,8,9,10)
- Pete Wingfield – piano (2,10), Wurlitzer piano (8,10), grand piano (9)
- Rabbit – Hammond organ (3)
- Mel Collins – alto saxophone, horns (2,3)
- Alan Spenner – bass (3)
- Brian "Bugs" Pemberton – drums (6)
- Freebo – fretless bass (6)
- Kevin Kelly – Fender piano (6)
- John Porter – bass (7,8)
- Rick Wolff – Chinese flutes (10)
- Mother Nature – crickets and ocean (11)

== Other personnel ==
- Duncan Davis – photography
- Michael Ross – Design (Lone Star Productions)

== Packaging ==
The original cardboard inner sleeve for the vinyl record was printed, on both sides, with a multicoloured lotus petal mandala.
