= Miss You in the Days =

Studio album by The Miserable Rich
- Released: October 24, 2011
- Genre: Folk
- Length: 43:17 (excluding Bonus EP)
- Language: English
- Label: Humble Soul/Hazelwood Records

The Miserable Rich chronology
'Of Flight & Fury' (2010)	Miss You in the Days (2011)

Miss You In The Days is the third full-length studio album by British chamber pop band The Miserable Rich, released in 2011. It was the follow-up to 2010's Of Flight & Fury and was funded by fan-funding music website PledgeMusic. Miss You In The Days was later supplemented with the bonus EP Miss You More containing tracks which didn't make the album, released on 16 April 2012 separately via Bandcamp and with special editions of the album.

Miss You In The Days is lyrically based on ghost stories and was recorded on location at various buildings around the UK that are reputedly haunted, primarily Blickling Hall in Norfolk.

== Track listing ==
No.	Title	Length
1.	"Laid Up In Lavender"	3:20
2.	"Imperial Lines"	4:27
3.	"Tramps"	3:46
4.	"Honesty"	4:15
5.	"Ringing The Changes"	5:09
6.	"The China Shop Of Dreams"	2:53
7.	"On A Certain Night"	4:10
8.	"Under Glass"	5:09
9.	"Pillion"	3:00
10.	"True Love"	5:05
11.	"In The Attic"	2:03

=== Miss You More Bonus EP ===
No.	Title	Length
1.	"Under Glass (Radio Edit)"	3:44
2.	"Lighthouse"	4:48
3.	"Fear Of The Dark (Oh! Polyanna!)"	4:47
4.	"The Telephone"	3:18
