= Sunny Side of the Street (Bryn Haworth album) =

Studio album by Bryn Haworth
- Released: 1975
- Recorded: 1975
- Studio: Island Studios, Hammersmith, London; Sound Techniques, Chelsea, London
- Genre: Folk, Gospel, R&B
- Label: Island ILPS 9332
- Producer: Bryn Haworth, Richard Digby Smith

Bryn Haworth chronology
Let the Days Go By (1974)	Sunny Side of the Street (1975)	Grand Arrival (1978)

Good Job Sample
An audio sample of "Good Job" (1975)

Sunny Side of the Street is the second studio album by Bryn Haworth, released in 1975 on the Island label.

Interviewed in 2009, Haworth commented on the album opening with the gospel song "Good Job": ".. I thought it was a great track. I thought, I've never heard anything like this before. I'd been listening to Andraé Crouch and all the Blind Boys stuff because there was nothing to listen to when you became a Christian back then so you'd go back in time. Andre Crouch: Live At Carnegie Hall was the best album that I'd heard at that time and then you went back to The Blind Boys and all the black gospel stuff and I thought, this is what I relate to because it's like R&B. My roots are more R&B roots; old style. So it started to come out in things like 'Good Job'."

== Track listing ==
All tracks are written by Bryn Haworth, except where noted

Side one
No.	Title	Writer(s)	Length
1.	"Good Job"		5:00
2.	"Pick Me Up"		3:22
3.	"Darlin' Cory"	Traditional (Roud 5723); arranged by Haworth and Zacuto	3:22
4.	"Dance"		3:02
5.	"Peace of Mind"		2:55

Side two
No.	Title	Writer(s)	Length
6.	"Give All You Got To Give"		5:10
7.	"Heaven Knows"		5:28
8.	"Sunny Side of the Street"	Jimmy McHugh, Dorothy Fields	2:30
9.	"Used"		5:17
10.	"Thank The Lord"		4:45

== Recording ==
The album was recorded at Island Studios, Hammersmith and Sound Techniques, Chelsea, London.

== Musicians ==
- Bryn Haworth – guitars, vocals (all tracks)
- Bruce Rowland – drums (1,2,4,5,7,9), talking drum (4), maracas (9), marimbas (4), bells (7), percussion (4)
- Terry Stannard – drums (1)
- Alan Spenner – bass (1,9)
- Chris Stainton – piano (1,2,9) and organ (1,9,10)
- Pat Donaldson – "big" bass (8)
- Dave Mattacks – drums (3,8,10)
- Pete Wingfield – "krazy keyboard" (8)
- Mel Collins – horns (6)
- Dave Pegg – bass (3,5,7) and bass lightly (4)
- Dave Swarbrick – fiddle (3)
- Alan Munde – banjo (3)
- Jimmy Mullen – guitar (6)
- Tony O'Malley – piano (6)
- Frank Collins – chorus (6)
- Madeline Bell – chorus (1)
- Lee Vanderbilt – chorus (1)
- Joanne Williams – chorus (1)
- Dyan Birch – chorus (6)
- Paddy McHugh – chorus (6)
- Gianin Loringett – tap dance (8)
- Richard "Diga" Digby Smith and Planet – hand claps (8)

=== Other personnel ===
- Bryn Haworth and Richard Digby Smith – producers
- Richard Digby Smith – engineer
- Dick Cuthell – assistant engineer
- Victor Gamm – basic engineering (3,8,10)
- Pennie Smith – cover photo
- Tony Wright – cover illustrations
- Eckford/Stimpson – design

== Packaging ==
The original cardboard inner sleeve for the vinyl record is printed, on both sides, with multicoloured stripes to match the shop-front awning illustration of the front cover.
