= Slide Don't Fret =

Studio album by Bryn Haworth
- Released: 1995
- Recorded: The Soundfield, Derbyshire
- Genre: Blues / Gospel
- Label: Kingsway
- Producer: Bryn Haworth, Neil Costello

Bryn Haworth chronology
The Bryn Haworth Band Live (1993)	Slide Don't Fret (1995)	The Finer Things In Life (1997)

Judgement Blues Sample
An audio sample of "Judgement Blues"

Slide Don't Fret is the thirteenth studio album by Bryn Haworth.

It was recorded in 1995 at The Soundfield, Derbyshire, was produced by Haworth, co-produced and engineered by Neil Costello, and released by Kingsway Records as KMCD932.

== Track listing ==
1. "Slide Don't Fret" – 4:41
2. "Cajun Song" – 6:04
3. "Home Sweet Home" – 4:11
4. "Judgement Blues" – 8:34
5. "Will You Be Ready" – 3:42
6. "Talk To Me" – 5:00
7. "Healing on Me" – 3:31
8. "All Because Of You" – 4:51
9. "I'm Grateful" – 3:37
10. "All Things Work Together" – 3:37
11. "Time for a Change" – 4:35

All songs written by Haworth.

== Personnel ==
- Bryn Haworth – guitars, mandolin and lead vocals
- Henry Spinetti – drums and percussion
- Les Moir – bass
- Howard Francis – keyboards
- Mal Pope – backing vocals
- Karlos Edwards – tambourines and percussion
- Steve Gregory – saxophones
- Raul D'Oliveira – trumpet
- Terry "Tex" Comer – bass
- Geraint Watkins – accordion
- John Bundrick – Hammond organ
- Neil Costello – guitar

== Other credits ==
- Producer – Bryn Haworth
- Co-producer and engineer – Nell Costello
- Executive Producer – Les Moir
- Recorded at – The Soundfield, Derbyshire
- Compiled and edited – Dave Ashton at the Digital Audio Co.
- Mastered – Ray Staff at Whitfield Studios
- Photography/Design – Paul Yates
