= Mountain Mover =

Studio album by Bryn Haworth
- Released: 1985
- Recorded: 1985 Chapel Lane Studios, Hereford
- Genre: Rock, blues, gospel
- Label: Word Records MYRR 1204
- Producer: Bryn Haworth

Bryn Haworth chronology
| Wings of the Morning (1984) | Mountain Mover (1985) | Blue and Gold (1989) |

Mountain Mover is the eighth studio album by Bryn Haworth.

It was recorded in August 1985 at the Chapel Lane Studios, Hereford was produced by Bryn Haworth, engineered by Laurence Burrage and released by Word Records (UK) on the Myrrh Label as MYRR 1204.

== Track listing ==
1. "Mountain Mover"
2. "Forever in Love"
3. "Reeling and Rocking"
4. "Slipping and Falling"
5. "Land of the Living"
6. "Teach Me Your Way"
7. "Victory Song"
8. "Making The Most of What You've Got"
9. "Saturday Morning"
10. "Nature of Man"

== Personnel ==
- Bryn Haworth - guitar, mandolin, vocals
- Henry Spinetti - drums, percussion
- Dave Markee - bass
- Chris Stainton - piano, keyboards
- Mel Collins - saxophone, horns
- Jeff Hammer - synthesizer
