= Ammonia Avenue =

1984 album by The Alan Parsons Project

Studio album by the Alan Parsons Project
- Released: 20 February 1984
- Studios: Abbey Road Studios, London, England
- Genres: Progressive rock; symphonic rock; pop rock; new wave
- Length: 40:22
- Label: Arista
- Producer: Alan Parsons

The Alan Parsons Project chronology
Eye in the Sky (1982)	Ammonia Avenue (1984)	Vulture Culture (1985)

Singles from Ammonia Avenue
- 1. "Don't Answer Me" Released: February 1984; 2. "Prime Time" Released: May 1984

Professional ratings
Review scores
Source	Rating
AllMusic	3.5/5 stars
Rolling Stone	2/5 stars

Ammonia Avenue is the seventh studio album by the British progressive rock duo the Alan Parsons Project, released in February 1984 by Arista Records. The Phil Spector-influenced "Don't Answer Me" was the album's lead single, and it reached the Top 15 on the US Billboard Hot 100 and Mainstream Rock Tracks charts, as well as the fourth position on the Adult Contemporary chart. The single also reached the Top 10 in several countries, including Belgium, Germany, the Netherlands, and Switzerland.

"Prime Time" was the album's second single and reached No. 34 on the US Billboard Hot 100. "You Don't Believe" had previously appeared on The Best of the Alan Parsons Project and was issued as that album's first single in November 1983, reaching No. 54 in the US and No. 43 in Canada.

Ammonia Avenue is one of the band's biggest-selling albums, carrying an RIAA certification of gold and reaching the Top 10 in a number of countries.

== Background and release ==
The title of the album was inspired by Eric Woolfson's visit to Imperial Chemical Industries (ICI) in Billingham, England, where the first thing he saw was a street with miles of pipes, no people, no trees and a sign that read 'Ammonia Avenue', whose portrait was used for the front cover. The album focuses on the possible misunderstanding of industrial scientific developments from a public perspective and a lack of understanding of the public from a scientific perspective. This album was the second of three recorded on analogue equipment and mixed directly to the digital master tape.

"You Don't Believe" had already been released as both a single and a new song on 1983's The Best of the Alan Parsons Project compilation. Arista Records took out an advertisement in the 3 March 1984 edition of Billboard with the title "Music World Stunned As Amazing Findings on NH3 Ave Are Revealed". The advertisement mentioned that the album had been released on 27 February 1984 in a vinyl and cassette format, with the music video for "Don't Answer Me" being serviced to MTV on the same day.

== Critical reception ==
Music Week said that Ammonia Avenue was an "excellent AOR album, about as pop as APP is likely ever to get." Billboard felt that the band's sound had been "fully established" with the release of Ammonia Avenue, adding that "only minor revisions can be detected with each new set", manifesting in songs in a "stately, soft-rock vein that has brought widespread pop acceptance and platinum sales".

== Reissue ==
Ammonia Avenue was remastered and reissued in 2008 with bonus tracks, and in 2020 as well, on Blu-Ray audio format, including a high-definition remaster in stereo and multichannel sound, and the two promotional videos of the album as a bonus. In 2024, the album was again completely remastered.

== Track listing ==
All songs written and composed by Alan Parsons and Eric Woolfson.

Side one
No.	Title	Lead vocals	Length
1.	"Prime Time"	Eric Woolfson	5:03
2.	"Let Me Go Home"	Lenny Zakatek	3:20
3.	"One Good Reason"	Woolfson	3:36
4.	"Since the Last Goodbye"	Chris Rainbow	4:34
5.	"Don't Answer Me"	Woolfson	4:11

Side two
No.	Title	Lead vocals	Length
1.	"Dancing on a Highwire"	Colin Blunstone	4:22
2.	"You Don't Believe"	Zakatek	4:26
3.	"Pipeline"	Instrumental	3:56
4.	"Ammonia Avenue"	Woolfson	6:30

2008 Bonus Tracks

1. "Don't Answer Me" (Early Rough Mix)
2. "You Don't Believe" (Demo)
3. "Since the Last Goodbye" (Chris Rainbow Vocal Overdubs)
4. "Since the Last Goodbye" (Eric Guide Vocal – Rough Mix)
5. "You Don't Believe" (Instrumental Tribute to The Shadows)
6. "Dancing on a Highwire/Spotlight" (Work in Progress)
7. "Ammonia Avenue Part 1" (Eric Demo Vocal – Rough Mix)
8. "Ammonia Avenue" (Orchestral Overdub)

== Personnel ==
- Ian Bairnson – electric and acoustic guitars
- Colin Blunstone – vocals on 6
- Mel Collins – saxophone on 5, 8
- Stuart Elliott – drums, percussion, Simmons toms
- Alan Parsons – Fairlight CMI on 1, 5, 7 & 8, LinnDrum on 7
- David Paton – electric bass
- Andrew Powell – orchestral arrangements and conducting
- Chris Rainbow – backing vocals on 1 & 5, vocals on 4, keyboards on 5
- Eric Woolfson – Wurlitzer piano, piano, synths, keyboards, Fairlight, vocals on 1, 3, 5 & 9
- Lenny Zakatek – vocals on 2, 7
- Christopher Warren-Green – The Philharmonia Orchestra leader
- Storm Thorgerson – album cover design

== Charts ==
=== Weekly charts ===
Chart (1984)	Peak position
Australian Albums (Kent Music Report)	16
Austrian Albums (Ö3 Austria)	5
Canada Top Albums/CDs (RPM)	29
Dutch Albums (Album Top 100)	1
European Albums (European Top 100 Albums)	3
German Albums (Offizielle Top 100)	1
Italian Albums (Musica e Dischi)	5
Norwegian Albums (VG-lista)	5
New Zealand Albums (RMNZ)	8
Spanish Albums (AFYVE)	2
Swedish Albums (Sverigetopplistan)	8
Swiss Albums (Schweizer Hitparade)	1
UK Albums (Official Charts)	24
US Billboard 200	15

Chart (2020)	Peak position
UK Independent Albums (Official Charts)	31

=== Year-end charts ===
Chart (1984)	Position
Australian Albums (Kent Music Report)	79
Austrian Albums (Ö3 Austria)	25
Dutch Albums (Album Top 100)	17
Swiss Albums (Schweizer Hitparade)	8
US Billboard 200	86

== Certifications ==
Region	Certification	Certified units/sales
Canada (Music Canada)	Gold	50,000^{^}
France (SNEP)	Platinum	400,000^{*}
Germany (BVMI)	Gold	250,000^{^}
Netherlands (NVPI)	Gold	50,000^{^}
United States (RIAA)	Gold	500,000^{^}
^{*} Sales figures based on certification alone.^{^} Shipments figures based on certification alone.
