= Twelve Ways to Count =

Twelve Ways To Count

Studio album by The Miserable Rich
- Released: 24 November 2008
- Genre: Chamber pop
- Labels: Humble Soul (UK) & Hazlewood Vinyl Plastics (Germany)
- Producers: James DeMalpaquet and William Calderbank

The Miserable Rich chronology
Twelve Ways To Count (2008)	Covers EP (2009)

Twelve Ways to Count is the debut album by British chamber pop band The Miserable Rich. It was released on 24 November 2008. Some of the songs contained were previously performed by James DeMalpaquet under the pseudonym 'James Grape' while in the band 'The Grape Authority' with fellow Miserable Rich member, Will Calderbank.

== Track listing ==
1. Early Mourning
2. Pisshead
3. Boat Song
4. The Knife-Throwers Hand
5. Monkey
6. Muswell
7. North Villas
8. The Time That's Mine
9. The Barmaids Cannon
10. Poodle
11. Merry Go Round
12. Button My Lip
13. Lullaby Of Death (Secret Track)
14. Over And Over - Hot Chip Cover (iTunes Version Only)

== Personnel ==
The Miserable Rich:

- William Calderbank: Cello
- Mike Siddell: Violin
- Jim Briffet: Guitar
- James DeMalpaquet: Vocals

Guests:

- Shaun Young: Guitar
- Lindsey Oliver: Double Bass
- Beatrice Sanjust Di Teulada: Vocals
- Jacob Richardson: Guitar/Vocal
- Alistair Straghan: Trumpets/Flugal Horn
- Doon Macdonald: Clarinet
- Tom Cowan: Resonator
- Magnus Williams: Double Bass
- Damian Fearns: Vocal
- Sam Hewitt: Vocal
- Sam Crombie: Drums
- Adrian Walker: Drums
- Vernon Aubrey: Beatbox
