= Of Flight & Fury =

Studio album by The Miserable Rich
- Released: May 31, 2010
- Genre: Folk
- Length: 45:04
- Language: English
- Label: Humble Soul

The Miserable Rich chronology
| Covers EP (2009) | Of Flight & Fury (2010) | Miss You In The Days (2011) |

Professional ratings
Review scores
| Source | Rating |
|---|---|
| Drowned in Sound | 7/10 |
| musicOMH | 3.5/5 stars |
| Southern Daily Echo | 3/5 |

Of Flight & Fury is the second full-length studio album by British chamber pop band The Miserable Rich. It saw the release of singles "Somerhill/Bye Bye Kitty," "Let Me Fade," and "Chestnut Sunday." "Pegasus" was used in 2009's Almost There: The Original Soundtrack.

== Critical reception ==
Drowned in Sound wrote: "Whilst The Miserable Rich don't match the intense emotional peaks and troughs of the baroque ten-piece, they make up for it by subverting such exuberant instrumental craft with an understated humble charm."

== Track listing ==
| No. | Title | Length |
|---|---|---|
| 1. | "Pegasus" | 4:32 |
| 2. | "Chestnut Sunday" | 4:19 |
| 3. | "Flight 1" | 0:35 |
| 4. | "Somerhill" | 4:42 |
| 5. | "The Mouth Of The Wolf" | 4:35 |
| 6. | "Flight 2" | 0:27 |
| 7. | "Bye Bye Kitty" | 3:50 |
| 8. | "For A Day" | 4:14 |
| 9. | "Flight 4" | 0:47 |
| 10. | "Oliver" | 5:42 |
| 11. | "Flight 3" | 0:47 |
| 12. | "Let Me Fade" | 4:38 |
| 13. | "Hungover" | 2:22 |
| 14. | "Manor Farm" | 3:42 |
