= One Year =

Studio album by Colin Blunstone
- Released: November 1971
- Recorded: 1970–1971
- Studio: Abbey Road Studios and Sound Techniques, London
- Genre: Chamber pop
- Length: 33:17
- Label: Epic
- Producer: Rod Argent, Chris White

Colin Blunstone chronology
One Year (1971)	Ennismore (1972)

Singles from One Year
- 1. "Mary Won't You Warm My Bed" Released: 1971; 2. "Caroline Goodbye" Released: 1971; 3. "Say You Don't Mind" Released: 1972

One Year is the debut solo studio album by English singer-songwriter Colin Blunstone, a member of the Zombies. It was released by Epic Records in 1971. It includes "Say You Don't Mind", which peaked at number 15 on the UK Singles Chart.

== Production ==
After the Zombies disbanded in 1968, Blunstone left the music business only to return after the surprise success of "Time of the Season". Recorded between 1970 and 1971, One Year was co-produced by Blunstone's former Zombie colleagues Rod Argent and Chris White. Some of the songs had previously been recorded during the last days of the Zombies, although they were re-recorded for this album. The string arrangements on six of the tracks were made by Christopher Gunning.

== Reception ==
Professional ratings
Review scores
Source	Rating
AllMusic	5/5 stars
The Encyclopedia of Popular Music	4/5 stars
The Rolling Stone Record Guide	4/5 stars

Reviewing the album for AllMusic, Fred Thomas wrote: "Marked by a thoughtfulness that’s always on the brink of despair, One Year is an understated masterpiece. It drifts by quickly but connects immediately, capturing the same stir of conflicting feelings as remembering a time that will never happen again, or a romance you wish hadn’t ended quite so soon." Neil Tennant said: "It's an incredibly romantic album, which is why it's been with me such a long time." Thurston Moore called it "a gorgeous example of classic British pop music." He added: "It's very personal, very sophisticated in its sentiment."

In 2007, The Guardian included it on the "1000 Albums to Hear Before You Die" list.

== Track listing ==
No.	Title	Writer(s)	Length
1.	"She Loves the Way They Love Her"	Rod Argent, Chris White	2:49
2.	"Misty Roses"	Tim Hardin	5:04
3.	"Smokey Day"	Rod Argent, Chris White	3:13
4.	"Caroline Goodbye"	Colin Blunstone	2:54
5.	"Though You Are Far Away"	Colin Blunstone	3:24
6.	"Mary Won't You Warm My Bed"	Mike d'Abo	3:11
7.	"Her Song"	Rod Argent, Chris White	3:31
8.	"I Can't Live Without You"	Colin Blunstone	3:27
9.	"Let Me Come Closer to You"	Colin Blunstone	2:24
10.	"Say You Don't Mind"	Denny Laine	3:20

2006 reissue edition bonus track
No.	Title	Writer(s)	Length
11.	"I Hope I Didn't Say Too Much Last Night" (mono single version)	Colin Blunstone	3:30

2010 reissue edition bonus tracks
No.	Title	Writer(s)	Length
11.	"I Hope I Didn't Say Too Much Last Night" (mono single version)	Colin Blunstone	3:30
12.	"Mary Won't You Warm My Bed" (mono single version)	Mike d'Abo	3:06

== Personnel ==
Credits adapted from liner notes.

Musicians

- Colin Blunstone – vocals, guitar
- Rod Argent – keyboards (1, 4 & 6)
- Russ Ballard – guitar (1, 4 & 6)
- Jim Rodford – bass guitar (1, 4 & 6)
- Robert Henrit – drums (1, 4 & 6)
- Alan Crosthwaite – guitar (2)

Technical personnel

- Chris White – production
- Rod Argent – arrangement (1, 4 & 6), production
- Chris Gunning – arrangement (2, 3, 5, 7, 8 & 10)
- Tony Visconti – arrangement (4 & 6)
- John Fiddy – arrangement (9)
- Jerry Boys – engineering (1 & 2)
- Peter Vince – engineering (2–10)
- Paul Ostrer – photography
