= You Don't Believe =

Single by The Alan Parsons Project

from the album The Best of the Alan Parsons Project
- B-side: "Lucifer"
- Released: 4 November 1983
- Length: 4:23
- Label: Arista
- Songwriters: Eric Woolfson, Alan Parsons
- Producer: Alan Parsons

The Alan Parsons Project singles chronology
"Old and Wise" (1982)	"You Don't Believe" (1983)	"Don't Answer Me" (1984)

"You Don't Believe" is a song by The Alan Parsons Project that was co-written by Eric Woolfson and Alan Parsons. It was first included on the band's 1983 compilation album The Best of the Alan Parsons Project, where it was the only previously unreleased track included on the album. Arista Records issued the track as a single to coincide with the release of the compilation and charted in both Canada and the United States. In 1984, "You Don't Believe" was also included on the band's 1984 studio album, Ammonia Avenue.

== Background ==
Parsons wrote "You Don't Believe" using a Fairlight CMI, which he played and programmed on the song. Parsons generated some of the guitar sounds on the Fairlight, which he retained for the final mix rather than replace them with real guitars. He had intended for the song to have vocals from the onset but still created an instrumental version of the track with Ian Bairnson playing a guitar part over the Fairlight instrumentation. This recording was included on remastered editions of Ammonia Avenue under the title "You Don't Believe (Instrumental Tribute to the Shadows)" as the band thought that Bairnson's lead guitar resembled the playing of Hank Marvin from The Shadows. The instrumental version of "You Don't Believe" was abandoned after Woolfson wrote some lyrics to accompany the track. When remixing "You Don't Believe" for the 2020 Ammonia Avenue box set, Parsons said that he "eased back on" the Simmons drum sound; he also expressed his approval for his surround sound mix of the song.

"You Don't Believe" first appeared on The Best of the Alan Parsons Project, a compilation album released in 1983. The song was serviced to radio stations in November of that year, including album oriented rock stations in the United States. For the week dated 11 November 1983, "You Don't Believe" was played on 66 percent of US album oriented rock radio stations reporting to Radio & Records with a primary listener demographic of individuals aged 12-24. The following week, the song was receiving airplay on certain radio stations across the United Kingdom, including Radio 210 and Radio Wyvern. It also received airplay on contemporary hit radio, with 40 percent of US radio stations in that format playing the song for the week dated 9 December 1983. That same month, "You Don't Believe" peaked at No. 54 on the United States Billboard Hot 100 and No. 43 on the Canadian RPM singles chart. It also reached No. 12 on the Billboard Rock Top Tracks chart, where it appeared on that listing for 17 weeks. Following its inclusion on The Best of the Alan Parsons Project, "You Don't Believe" appeared on the band's 1984 album Ammonia Avenue.

== Personnel ==
- Alan Parsons – Fairlight CMI, LinnDrum
- Eric Woolfson – additional keyboards
- Ian Bairnson – guitar, guitar synth
- David Paton – electric bass
- Stuart Elliott – additional drums
- Lenny Zakatek – vocals

== Charts ==
Chart (1983)	Peak position
Canada Top Singles (RPM)	43
US Billboard Hot 100	54
US Mainstream Rock (Billboard)	12
