= Sirius (instrumental) =

1982 song by the Alan Parsons Project

Single by the Alan Parsons Project

from the album Eye in the Sky
- A-side: "Sirius"; "Eye in the Sky"
- B-side: "Mammagamma"
- Released: August 1982
- Recorded: 1981–1982
- Studio: Abbey Road, London
- Genre: Progressive rock; space rock; instrumental rock
- Length: 1:48
- Label: Arista
- Songwriters: Alan Parsons; Eric Woolfson
- Producer: Alan Parsons

The Alan Parsons Project singles chronology
"Snake Eyes" (1981)	"Sirius" / "Eye in the Sky" / "Mammagamma" (1982)	"Psychobabble" (1982)

Audio
- "Sirius" by the Alan Parsons Project on YouTube

"Sirius" is an instrumental by British rock duo The Alan Parsons Project, recorded for their sixth studio album, Eye in the Sky (1982). Nearly two minutes long, it segues into "Eye in the Sky" on the album. Since 1984, it has been played at Chicago Bulls home games, as well as for Nebraska Cornhuskers football home entrances, and subsequently became a staple at many other college and professional sporting events throughout North America, including the start of every game that the United States national team played (as well as all games during the first matchday) at the 2026 FIFA World Cup.

== Background ==
Alan Parsons wanted the first song on the album to be "Eye in the Sky", but felt there needed to be an introduction leading up to it as had been done on several previous albums. As he was working on ideas at home on his Fairlight CMI, he wrote a riff that he liked, which ultimately became "Sirius". This riff was played using a clavinet sample with added tape delay. Haydn Bendall, an audio engineer who worked at Abbey Road Studios, played the keyboard arpeggio that follows the entrance of the power chords on the electric guitar.

Originally, "Sirius" was not written in the same key as "Eye in the Sky", but was re-recorded in the studio once the band realized it could lead into "Eye in the Sky". They ultimately settled on the key of B minor due to its compatibility with the key of D major found on "Eye in the Sky".

== Usage in media ==
=== Sports ===
"Sirius" has been used as the starting lineup introduction song for the Chicago Bulls since the late 1980s. The song was chosen by public address announcer Tommy Edwards after he heard it playing in a local movie theater. The Bulls went on to win six NBA championships in eight years with the song in the 1990s, which led many other NBA teams to use the song in the 1990s, including the Phoenix Suns, Utah Jazz, and San Antonio Spurs. Since 2006, a version arranged by Ethan Stoller and Kaotic Drumline's Jamie Poindexter has been used. "Sirius" was the opening number of the 2000 documentary Michael Jordan to the Max. Since 1994, "Sirius" has also been used for the Nebraska Cornhuskers football team's introductory "Tunnel Walk" before home games. Shortly after his 1985 arrival in the WWE, Ricky Steamboat used it as his entrance theme.

On February 28, 2026, at WWE Elimination Chamber at the United Center in Chicago, Illinois, Chicago-native professional wrestler CM Punk paid tribute to the 1990s-era Bulls as he walked from his locker room to Gorilla position while "Sirius" played. Former Bulls public address announcer Ray Clay, who had served in that role for all six Jordan-era NBA championship teams, introduced Punk.

For the 2026 FIFA World Cup, Sirius was used for the theme song for the entrances of the national teams before each game during the first matchday of the group stage, as well as those of the United States national team.

=== Response from the Alan Parsons Project ===
The Project did not know until "about 20 years [later]" the Chicago Bulls had been using "Sirius", with members of Eric Woolfson's family saying:

For about 20 years, we were completely unaware that the Chicago Bulls used "Sirius". No deal was done, (Note: Parsons clarified: "Music played in a venue is not subject to any specific payments to the performers or writers – it just gets lumped into the blanket fees that venues pay to collection agencies such as BMI, ASCAP and SESAC.") so we didn't know about it[.]

— Sally Woolfson

We were at friends' houses in Florida and they said to us, "You must be making a fortune out of the Chicago Bulls", and were amazed that we didn't know what they meant.

— Hazel Woolfson

According to Parsons, nobody from the Chicago Bulls contacted Parsons for permission to play "Sirius" at the venue, who said that "it would have been appreciated had they called me and asked for my blessing. But the fact of the matter is, venues have a blanket agreement with [performing-rights organizations] like ASCAP, BMI and SESAC. They can actually play whatever they want and just pay this blanket fee, which I am a small part of — like 1/100,000,000th of it. It would have been nice to have been contacted, but whenever it has been used in advertising or movies, I always get a nice little check for it."

=== Film, television, and video games ===
The song was used in the trailer for Anchorman 2: The Legend Continues, in the film Cloudy with a Chance of Meatballs, in the film Beating Hearts (2024) and was played in a Nissan Altima TV advertisement. It is featured on the soundtracks to NBA 2K11, which is used in the Michael Jordan intro, and a remixed version of the song is used in NBA 2K18. A soundalike version was used in The Adventures of Jimmy Neutron, Boy Genius episode "Vanishing Act". The instrumental was featured in the Frasier episode "Hooping Cranes" when Niles Crane (the younger brother to Frasier) unknowingly participates in a Seattle SuperSonics' competition to shoot a basketball from half-court and manages to do so. It appears in 2017 TV commercials for Best Buy. The 2018 movie Blockers also plays the song.

On UK television, the track was used on the BBC series Record Breakers as the introductory and background music for the "Norris on the Spot" segment, where co-presenter Norris McWhirter answered unscripted questions related to World Records from the studio audience. It was also used as the main theme of Concorde Special 1989. The track appears in series one of the 2018 YouTube Premium production Cobra Kai when Johnny Lawrence (William Zabka) tells Miguel Diaz (Xolo Maridueña) "I'm gonna be your sensei." It was also played at the end of the first episode of The Last Dance, a ten-part documentary miniseries by ESPN and Netflix centering around the Chicago Bulls 1997–98 season, when they won their sixth NBA championship. The opening arpeggio is similar to that of the track, "Corridors of Time" in the progressive rock-influenced score for the game, Chrono Trigger.

The song is heard briefly in Space Jam: A New Legacy, which is a sequel to the original film, during the scene where Sylvester the Cat tries to summon Michael Jordan to help the Tune Squad win the game against Al-G Rhythm and the Goon Squad, only to find out that it is the actor, Michael B. Jordan instead. It was also used in the final episode of Knuckles. In 2023, the song was also used in the sports drama film, Air, which centers around Michael Jordan. In June 2024, it was used in a promotional clip for Deadpool & Wolverine. The song also appeared in the season 2 finale of Severance.

== Track listing ==
All tracks are written by Alan Parsons and Eric Woolfson.

Side A
No.	Title	Length
1.	"Sirius" (instrumental)	1:48
2.	"Eye in the Sky"	4:33

Side B
No.	Title	Length
1.	"Mammagamma" (instrumental)	3:34

== Personnel ==
- Ian Bairnson – electric guitars
- Stuart Elliott – drums, percussion
- Alan Parsons – clavinet, Fairlight CMI, delay
- David Paton – bass guitar
- Andrew Powell – orchestral arrangement, orchestral conductor
- Eric Woolfson – keyboards
- Haydn Bendall – keyboards

== Covers ==
- "Sirius" is sampled in "The Saga Continues (Intro)", the opening track of P. Diddy and The Bad Boy Family's 2001 album The Saga Continues... The song is also sampled in "B.O.M.B.S." by Fabolous and "Miami Shit" by Pitbull.
- Armin van Buuren and AVIRA released a trance cover of the track in 2021.
- "Sirius" was covered along with "Eye in the Sky" by Zombi on their 2022 album Zombi & Friends, Volume 1.
- Borna Matosic wrote a cover for "Sirius" on June 11, 2020. Then later, this version was used for the Paramount+ and Sonic the Hedgehog show: Knuckles.
- "Sirius" was sampled in the song "Pulsar" by Argentine rock singer Gustavo Cerati from the album Amor Amarillo.
