= Wings of the Morning (album) =

Studio album by Bryn Haworth
- Released: 1984
- Recorded: December 1982 – July 1983
- Genre: Folk, Gospel, R&B
- Label: Chapel Lane CLS 8013
- Producer: Bryn Haworth

Bryn Haworth chronology
| Pass It On (1984) | Wings of the Morning (1984) | Mountain Mover (1985) |

Wings of the Morning is the seventh studio album by Bryn Haworth.

== Track listing ==
1. "Give Thanks (Psalm 33)"
2. "Lord I Love Your Word"
3. "Were You There"
4. "Let Us Humbly Worship Jesus"
5. "Make Us Holy"
6. "Awake O Zion"
7. "I Found A Love"
8. "We Give Thanks"
9. "More Than A Tent"
10. "He Is Lord"
11. "Strong Wall"
12. "What Kind Of Love Is This"

== Personnel ==
=== Musicians ===
- Bryn Haworth - guitar, vocals
- Henry Spinetti - drums
- Dave Markee - bass
- Pete Wingfield - piano, keyboards
- Fran Byrne - drums
- Terry "Tex" Comer - bass
- Bam King - rhythm guitar
- Steve Gregory - saxophone

=== Production ===
- Produced - Bryn Haworth
- Engineered - Paul Cobbold, Dave Charles and Rob Andrews
- Mixed - Paul Cobbold
- Front cover painting - Robin Clifton
- Photography - Tony Neeves
