= Keep the Ball Rolling =

Studio album by Bryn Haworth
- Released: 1979
- Recorded: 1979
- Studio: Olympic Studios, London
- Genre: R&B, Gospel, Folk
- Label: A&M AMLH 68507
- Producer: Doug Bennett, Jon Astley

Bryn Haworth chronology
Grand Arrival (1978)	Keep the Ball Rolling (1979)	The Gap (1980)

Keep the Ball Rolling is the fourth studio album by Bryn Haworth. Two of the tracks - "Luxury Liner" and ""Standing on the Rock" - feature Cliff Richard on backing vocals. Haworth had previously worked with Richard on his 1978 Small Corners album.

== Track listing ==
All tracks composed by Bryn Haworth; except where indicated

1. "Keep the Ball Rolling"
2. "First Time"
3. "Let Me Love You"
4. "Standing on the Rock"
5. "City Boy"
6. "Party Girl"
7. "Luxury Liner"
8. "Unchained Melody" (Alex North, Hy Zaret)
9. "Unemployment Blues"
10. "Working for Love"

== Personnel ==
- Bryn Haworth - guitar, vocals
- Simon Morton – percussion
- Tony Rivers – backing vocals on "Let Me Love You"
- Henry Spinetti – drums
- Chris Stainton – piano on "Keep the Ball Rolling", organ on "Standing on the Rock" and "Unemployment Blues"
- Pete Wingfield – keyboards
- John Perry – backing vocals on "Keep the Ball Rolling" and "Let Me Love You"
- Dave Markee – bass
- Bud Beadle – baritone saxophone
- Stuart Calver – backing vocals on "Let Me Love You"
- Mel Collins – saxophone, flute
- Jim Cuomo – saxophone
- Martin Drover – trumpet, flugelhorn
- Steve Gregory – flute, saxophone
- Terry Hellyer – trombone
- Cliff Richard – backing vocals on "Standing on the Rock" and "Luxury Liner"
- Ted Astley - string arrangements
- Lyle Harper - brass arrangements
