= Bryn Haworth =

British Christian singer-songwriter (born 1948)

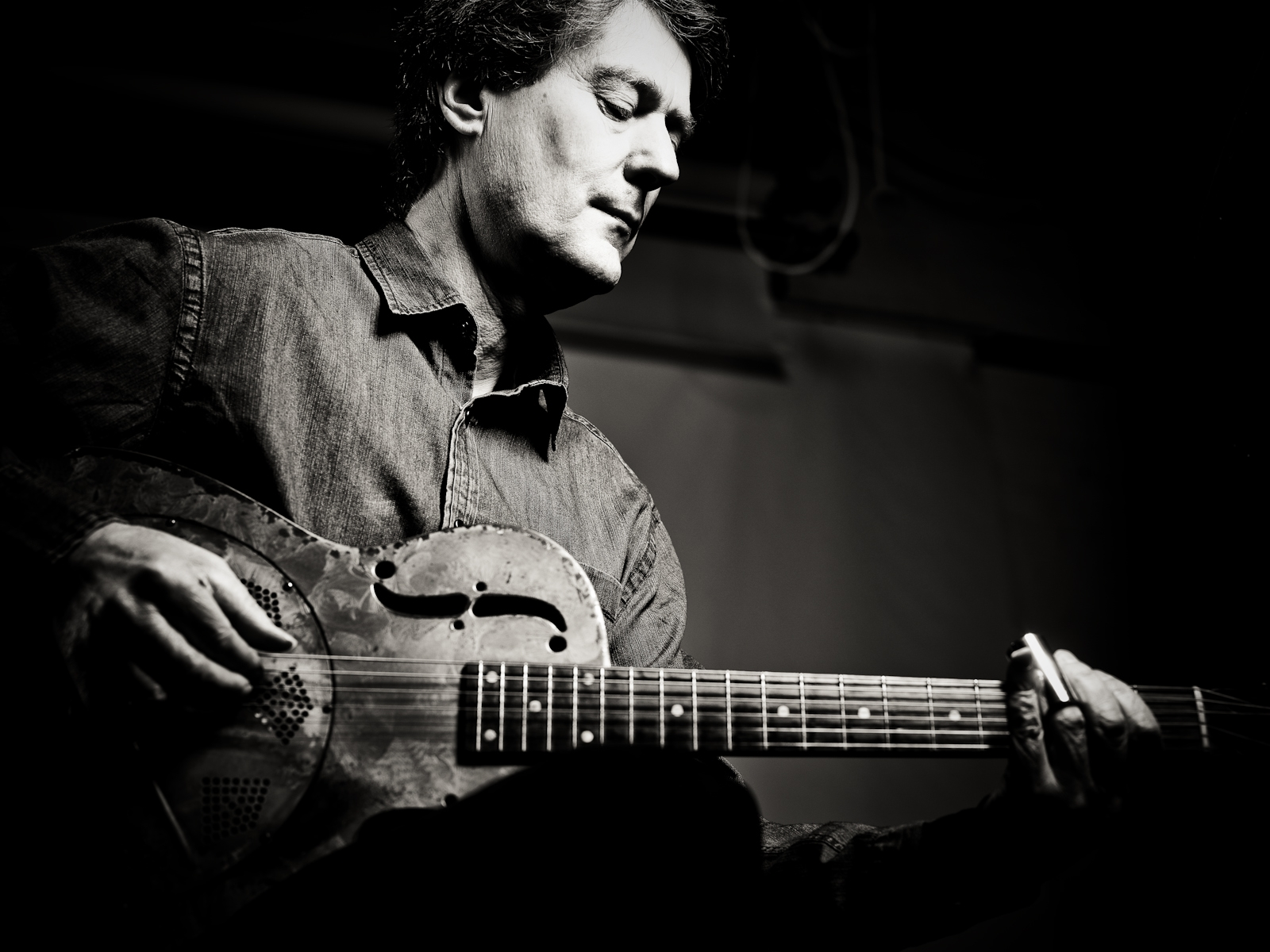
- Haworth circa 2011

Background information
- Born: Bryn Haworth; 29 July 1948 (age 78); Blackburn, Lancashire, England
- Origin: Darwen, Lancashire, England
- Genres: Jesus music, rock, gospel, R&B
- Occupations: Musician, singer, composer
- Instruments: Guitar, mandolin, vocals
- Years active: 1967–present
- Labels: Island A&M, Chapel Lane, Word Records, Bella Music
- Website: www.brynhaworth.com

Nobody's Fault sample
An audio sample of "Nobody's Fault But Mine" (from Inside Out, 2010)

Bryn Haworth (born 29 July 1948) is a British Christian singer-songwriter, guitarist, and pioneer of Jesus music in mainstream rock. Born in Blackburn, Lancashire, England, he has released some twenty-two albums and several singles since the 1970s, as well as guesting as guitarist on many other albums by rock and folk artists. He continues to tour in the UK, appearing mostly at smaller venues, Christian centres and at prisons. He has also appeared three times at the UK Greenbelt Festival. His chosen instruments include guitar (particularly slide or bottleneck guitar) and mandolin.

In the mid-1970s he recorded sessions for the John Peel show on BBC Radio 1 and made two television appearances on BBC Two's The Old Grey Whistle Test. More recently, with wife Sally, Haworth has engaged in extensive musical and evangelical work in prison settings.

== Early years ==
Bryn Haworth was born in 1948 in Blackburn, Lancashire, England and was brought up in the nearby town of Darwen. His father was a maths teacher and he attended the secondary school where his father taught, Darwen Technical College His main musical influence, however, was his mother, who would often buy the latest 78 releases by such artists as Elvis Presley, Jackie Wilson and Little Richard as well as classical records At the age of 11 Haworth obtained his first guitar and attended lessons in classical guitar for a year. Contemporary musical influences included guitar-based groups such as The Ventures and The Shadows. While still at school, during the era of the Merseybeat groups such as The Beatles, Haworth started playing guitar himself in various local groups, including The Mustangs, The Railroaders and The Mike Taylor Combo.

His first job on leaving school was at the local paper mill, but his band-playing activities led to his dismissal. Haworth later recalled "I couldn’t get up in the morning as I’d been out late the previous night playing in a band, so something had to give."

At 17 Haworth left Lancashire for London, with only a suitcase and a guitar and ended up sleeping rough at Victoria bus station. He eventually met up with members of the band Wynder K. Frog and was able to sleep on the floor of the house which the band shared.

== Career ==
=== Early work ===
Within six months of his arrival in London, Haworth joined the Fleur de Lys, a psychedelic rock and freakbeat band, which became house band for Atlantic Records in England, and whose members included bassist Gordon Haskell and pianist Pete Sears. As houseband for Atlantic, Fleur de Lys recorded albums with such artists as Isaac Hayes, Dave Porter and Barney Kessel. 1968 also saw Haworth providing guitar backing for Sharon Tandy on such singles as "Hold On". "Daughter of the Sun", "Gotta Get Enough Time", "Look and Find", "Love is not a Simple Affair", "Stay With Me", "Somebody Speaks Your Name", "Our Day Will Come" and "Hurry Hurry Choo Choo". The band had a residency at London's The Speakeasy Club and on one occasion Haworth enjoyed a jam-session, playing "Red House", on stage with Jimi Hendrix. For a time Tandy and Haworth were a couple.

When Fleur de Lys folded, Haworth travelled to California. In 1969 he met American musician Leigh Stephens who had just left the acid band "Blue Cheer" (in the Guinness Book of Records at the time as being the loudest band in the world). He toured extensively in the US as guitarist in various American bands, including the Jackie Lomax Band, and Wolfgang, (with Leigh Stephens and managed by the legendary Bill Graham who named the band after his own original Polish name) appearing with such artists as Led Zeppelin, Jefferson Airplane, Taj Mahal, Grateful Dead and The Moody Blues.

Bryn eventually moved to Woodstock in upstate New York, working again with Jackie Lomax on his second and third albums. It was in Woodstock that Bryn met future wife Sally. Returning to the UK in 1973, Bryn lived with Sally in a remote cottage in North Wales before being signed to Island Records for whom he made his debut solo album Let the Days Go By.

A further album for Island, Sunny Side of the Street, was recorded in 1974. He then continued his career as a solo recording artist with A&M Records with which he recorded Grand Arrival (in Nashville with JJ Cale's producer Audie Ashworth) and Keep the Ball Rolling. During this period he made numerous radio and TV appearances, and toured extensively in UK and Europe, supporting such artists as Traffic, Bad Company, Gallagher and Lyle and Fairport Convention. His prowess as a guitarist was recognised by Alexis Korner who played Bryn's records on his BBC programme.

In 1974 Haworth and wife Sally became Christians and this life-changing experience brought a strong gospel influence into his music.

In the 1970s, Haworth appeared on the weekly ITV television show "Pop Gospel", presented by Berni Flint. He recorded sessions for the John Peel show on BBC Radio 1 in 1974, 1975 and 1976, and made two television appearances on BBC Two's The Old Grey Whistle Test.

=== Later work ===
Haworth has recorded with a number of well known musicians including Chris de Burgh, Joan Armatrading, Ian Matthews and Gerry Rafferty (on five of his albums, but notably on On a Wing and a Prayer, Over My Head and Another World). He has also toured as part of the band with Cliff Richard.

Together with wife Sally, Haworth has engaged in extensive musical and evangelical work in prison settings. From 1989 to 1992, Haworth worked with the SW London Vineyard developing the worship and prison ministry, and leading worship at many UK conferences. He continues to travel extensively, performing concerts both solo and with a band and also leads seminars and guitar clinics throughout the world, in a wide variety of venues including concert halls, colleges, churches and prisons.

Haworth also has a long song-writing pedigree and has had several of his compositions recorded by other artists including Lulu, Sandy Denny and Mary Black (for the latter on her 1999 album Speaking with the Angel).

He made a brief UK tour in September 1997, with a line-up of Haworth (vocals, guitar), Jeff Hamer (guitar), Terry 'Tex' Comer (bass) (previously of the band Ace) and Henry Spinetti (drums). He has recorded ten further albums (see discography below) including Songs & Hymns which was recorded at Fairport Convention's Woodworm Studios in Oxfordshire.

The CD Water From The Rock, a compilation of faith tracks, was the first release on Haworth's own new record label, "Bella Music Ltd". A long-awaited CD of brand new songs Keep the Faith was released in 2005. Haworth is featured in the Crossrythms artists catalogue.

=== Recent work ===
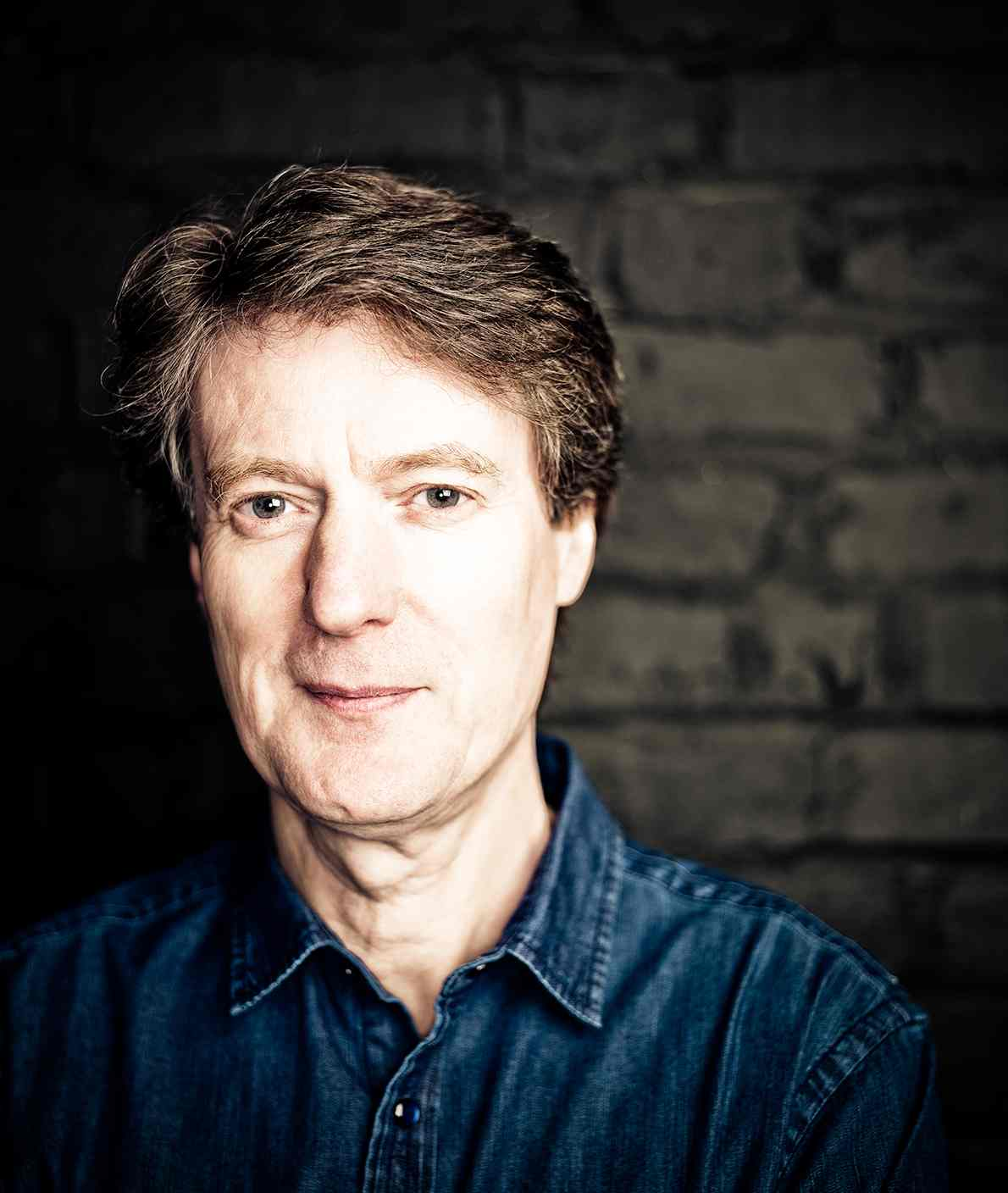
Publicity photograph

Haworth's 2010 albums were One Way Ticket and Inside Out, both issued on Bella Music. One Way Ticket is a mix of 12 brand new songs and instrumentals. Inside Out is a compilation for prison inmates with six new songs plus half a dozen tracks from previous albums which are particularly relevant for them. The recordings were made between January and March 2010 at the ICC Studios in Eastbourne and were mixed in early June. Neil Costello is co-producer. Other musicians include Henry Spinetti on drums, Dave Bronze on bass, Mark Edwards on keyboards and Mal Pope on backing vocals. Special guest appearance Paul Jones plays harmonica on the One Way Ticket title track.

In December 2018, he uploaded the instrumental "Blue Jumper" to his YouTube channel. In May 2019, collaborating with filmmaker Nigel Walk, he launched his latest single and video project, "Enough is Enough", which was written in response to the My Tree Matters campaign, speaking out against the indiscriminate felling of trees.

In September 2020 Haworth released a new album Peace & Understanding and in September 2021 another titled Ready or Not. In 2024 Haworth re-recorded the song "All I Need Is a Home", originally recorded for the Let the Days Go By album, and produced a video, with international film director Nigel Walk, to help raise awareness of homelessness.

A 2003 review of The Gap album concluded: "He's largely unknown, but those who follow virtuosos know about this guy". John Ingham, for Sounds, wrote: "...if we are to have God-rock, then let it be Bryn Haworth; he thinks of the music foremost ... you owe yourself a listen.

== Solo discography ==
=== Albums ===
- Let the Days Go By (1974), Island Records
- Sunny Side of the Street (1975), Island Records
- Grand Arrival (1978), A&M Records
- Keep the Ball Rolling, (1979), A&M Records
- The Gap, (1980) Chapel Lane
- 12 Classics (1981, compilation, re-issued 2017), Chapel Lane
- Pass It On, (1984), Chapel Lane
- Wings of the Morning (1984, re-issued 1995), Chapel Lane
- Mountain Mover (1986, re-issued 2012), Word Records
- Blue and Gold (1989), Edge
- Chronology (1989, compilation), Myrrh
- Take Our Lives (Vineyard Music Group) (1991, featured worship leader)
- More Than a Singer (1992), Kingsway
- The Bryn Haworth Band Live (1993), Kingsway
- Slide Don't Fret (1995), Kingsway
- The Finer Things in Life (1997, with Kevin Prosch), Kingsway
- Songs & Hymns (1999), Kingsway
- More Than a Singer / Band Live (2002, repackage, double CD), Kingsway
- Water from the Rock (2002, compilation, re-issued 2017), BMH Music
- Let the Days Go By, Sunny Side of the Street (2004, repackage, double CD)
- Simply Bryn Haworth (repackage of Wings of the Morning, Songs & Hymns, More Than a Singer) (2005, repackage, triple CD)
- Keep the Faith (2005), Bella Music
- One Way Ticket (2010), Bella Music
- Inside Out (2010) (compilation for prisoners), Bella Music
- Time Out (2014), Bella Music
- Rebel Man (2015), Bella Music
- Peace & Understanding (2020), BMH Music
- Ready or Not (2021), BMH Music

=== Singles ===
- "Grappenhall Rag" (1974) Island Records
- "Give All You Got to Give" (1975) Island Records
- "We're All One" (1978) A&M Records
- "Woman Friend" (1978) A&M Record
- "Come See What Love / Full Day" (1978) A&M Records
- "Keep the Ball Rolling" (1979) A&M Records (with Albert Lee, 9-track limited edition promo)
- "Unchained Melody" (1979) A&M Records
- "City Boy" (1979) A&M Records
- "It Could Have Been Me" (1980) Chapel Lane
