= Say You Don't Mind =

1967 song by Denny Laine

Single by Colin Blunstone

from the album One Year
- Released: 1972
- Label: Epic
- Songwriter: Denny Laine

Colin Blunstone singles chronology
"Caroline Goodbye" (1972)	"Say You Don't Mind" (1972)	"How Could We Dare to Be Wrong" (1973)

Official audio
- "Say You Don't Mind" on YouTube

"Say You Don't Mind" is a song written and originally recorded by English musician Denny Laine. In an unusual strings-only arrangement, it was a top 15 hit in the UK for the English singer Colin Blunstone in 1972.

== History ==
Blunstone, with his onstage band, performing "Say You Don't Mind" during a 2026 show in the United States, introducing it by saying it was "written by the late, great Denny Laine"

Laine wrote the song in 1967 after he had quit the Moody Blues and was forming the Electric String Band. He recorded the song as his debut solo single, with a string arrangement by John Paul Jones, but it failed to chart. It did receive positive critical notices though.

Episode Six (featuring future Deep Purple singer Ian Gillan and bassist Roger Glover) recorded the song at a BBC session in January 1968, with keyboardist Sheila Carter singing lead. The song was also recorded in 1970 by British psychedelic pop group Orange Bicycle, for their first album.

The song was revisited by former Zombies frontman Colin Blunstone in 1971 as the closing track on his first solo album, One Year. He had suggested recording the song while the Zombies were still active, but this never happened. The recording featured a string arrangement by Christopher Gunning, which has only vocals and strings, no other instruments. The session involved a 21-piece string section. According to Blunstone, Gunning was paid a flat fee of £15 to write the score.

The recording was released as a single on Epic Records and became a hit, reaching number 15 on the UK Singles Chart in February 1972. (The popularity was enough to make Deram Records, Laine's label, re-release his original single.)

Laine later said that due to an erroneous publishing contract, he did not receive songwriting royalties from Blunstone's hit. In a 2007 interview, Blunstone related a recent conversation between the two of them: "Denny said, 'I never got a penny for writing that song.' So I said, 'If it makes you feel any better, I never got a penny for singing it.'" Blunstone added, "That's the way it was in those days."

== Reception ==
A contemporary review by a writer for the Coventry Evening Telegraph praised Blunstone's version as outstanding, with a "delicate and sensitive" vocal and a "subtlety of expression" over Laine's original. In the retrospective words of a writer for the Dorset Echo, the song is "wonderful" and "Laine's finest composition", elevated further by Blunstone's "singularly beautiful" version of it. A writer for the Southern Daily Echo refers to the Blunstone's effort as a "classic single". In 2006, Neil Tennant of Pet Shop Boys said of Blunstone, "It's a very energetic song but it's driven by the strings and that's unusual in pop. He has a very delicate voice: I think he's the missing link between Dusty Springfield and Nick Drake."

== Live performances ==
The song was performed live by Wings on their 1972–73 tours, and was one of the few songs in the live set to feature Laine singing lead vocals instead of Paul McCartney. Laine later recorded another version, after leaving Wings in 1980, featured on the album Japanese Tears. He featured the song live in concert, and it appeared on 1997's Performs the Hits of Wings.
