= Psychobabble (song) =

Single by The Alan Parsons Project

from the album Eye in the Sky
- B-side: "Children of the Moon"
- Released: November 1982
- Recorded: 1981–1982
- Length: 4:51 (album version); 3:29 (single edit)
- Label: Arista
- Songwriters: Alan Parsons, Eric Woolfson
- Producers: Alan Parsons, Eric Woolfson

The Alan Parsons Project singles chronology
"Eye in the Sky" (1982)	"Psychobabble" (1982)	"Old and Wise" (1982)

"Psychobabble" is a song by the British progressive rock duo The Alan Parsons Project from their 1982 studio album, Eye in the Sky. The song was co-written by Alan Parsons and Eric Woolfson, who also served as the song's co-producers. Elmer Gantry, who had previously sang on "May Be a Price to Pay" on the band's previous album, The Turn of a Friendly Card, sang lead vocals on "Psychobabble". It was released as the album's second single in certain territories, including the United States, where it peaked at No. 57 on the Billboard Hot 100.

== Background ==
"Psychobabble" was the first song recorded for Eye in the Sky and according to Alan Parsons was started roughly one year prior to the remaining tracks on the album. They asked Elmer Gantry to perform lead vocals on "Psychobabble", who had previously worked with the band on their album The Turn of a Friendly Card.

In the liner notes for the 35th anniversary of Eye in the Sky, Eric Woolfson's wife Hazel commented that he wrote "Psychobabble" about her coursework from her psychology degree. Their daughter Lorna elaborated that Hazel was under the impression that she excessively talked about her degree, believing that Eric found the subject matter constituted "psychobabble". When mixing "Psychobabble", Alan Parsons added some reverb to the bass guitar to make the instrument more prominent, explaining that it was "a featured part" of the song. For the instrumental interlude found in the middle of the song, Parsons took inspiration from the movie Psycho, particularly the shower scene. Some sound effects from air-raid sirens were also incorporated into this musical passage.

Why we had air-raid sirens is completely baffling, but it just seemed to be like a nice idea at the time...As the title might suggest, for the middle section we used a lot of musical clichés normally associated with horror films."

"Psychobabble" initially received some airplay on US album oriented rock stations, where it peaked at No. 54 on the Billboard Top Tracks chart. The song was serviced to US contemporary hit radio stations in November 1982. It debuted on the Billboard Hot 100 at No. 82 during the week of 27 November 1982. By the following month, 41 percent of contemporary hit radio stations in the United States reporting to Radio & Records were playing the song. It peaked at No. 57 for the week dated 25 December 1982 and spent a total of ten weeks on the Hot 100.

== Critical reception ==
In their review of the single, Billboard magazine referred to "Psychobabble" as "a complete turnaround" from the band's previous single, "Eye in the Sky" that forwent "a mellow mood in favor of gruff hard rock", adding that the song "relies on reverberation and [a] tough beat". Stephen Thomas Erlewine of AllMusic thought that the song had "a bright propulsive edge" and was "not all that dissimilar from 10cc".

== Personnel ==
- Elmer Gantry – lead vocals
- Eric Woolfson – keyboards
- Ian Bairnson – guitars, backing vocals
- David Paton – bass guitar
- Stuart Elliott – drums
- Jack Harris – backing vocals
- Andrew Powell – orchestral arrangement and conductor
- Bob Howes – chorusmaster of The English Chorale

== Chart performance ==
Chart (1982)	Peak position
Spain (AFYVE)	18
US Billboard Hot 100	57
US Mainstream Rock (Billboard)	54
