= Pete Wingfield =

English musician (born 1948)

- Born: William Peter Wingfield; 7 May 1948 (age 77); Liphook, Hampshire, England
- Occupations: Musician; record producer; songwriter
- Instruments: Keyboards; vocals

William Peter Wingfield (born 7 May 1948) is an English record producer, keyboard player, songwriter, singer, and music journalist.

== Career ==
He was born in Liphook, Hampshire, England. Whilst studying at the University of Sussex, Wingfield and three other students formed the group Jellybread. In 1969 he played keyboards and sang on their First Slice album, which was produced by Mike Vernon for the Blue Horizon label.

In the 1970s, Wingfield was a specialist in soul music and regularly contributed articles and reviews to the monthly journals, Let It Rock and Melody Maker. As a performer, he played with the British soul band Olympic Runners, and Albert Lee & Hogan's Heroes.

In 1971 Wingfield played the piano on the B.B. King in London album, and in the following year received similar credits for Seventy-Second Brave, the Keef Hartley Band album. Wingfield played keyboards on Bryn Haworth's 1974 album, Let the Days Go By and on his 1975 follow-up Sunny Side of the Street. In 1983 Wingfield played keyboards on Haworth's album, Pass It On. He also played on several albums by Colin Blunstone, including the 1974 collection, Journey.

=== "Eighteen with a Bullet" ===
Wingfield hit the singles charts on both sides of the Atlantic in 1975 with "Eighteen with a Bullet," a pastiche doo-wop number involving wordplay on hit record chart positions—a bullet, in record-chart parlance, referring to a song still selling strongly and/or moving up the charts. It entered the Billboard Hot 100 chart on 23 August 1975. On the Billboard Hot 100 for the week ending 22 November 1975, the tune lived up to its name by charting at no. 18, with a bullet. The song peaked at no. 15 a week later. It also reached no. 7 in the UK Singles Chart. while peaking at no. 31 on the Australian chart in late 1975. The song was Wingfield's only charting single in the UK or Australia, or on the American Hot 100; however, the follow-up, "Lovin' As You Wanna Be", made it to no. 108 in the US.

"Eighteen with a Bullet" featured on the only album Wingfield released, Breakfast Special, on Island label (1975). A follow-up album, Love Bumps and Dizzy Spells, was never released. The song later featured on the soundtrack to the 1998 film, Lock, Stock and Two Smoking Barrels.

"Eighteen with a Bullet" is the official theme song of the 18th Street gang. Today, "Eighteen with a Bullet" has been covered by artists including Derrick Harriot (1975), The Tamlins (1975) and Lewis Taylor & Carleen Anderson (1998).

=== Later career ===
He played piano for the Alan Parsons rhythm section at Abbey Road Studios, with Pete Moss on bass guitar, and for Dexys Midnight Runners and Paul McCartney.

In 1977, his song "Making a Good Thing Better" appeared on Olivia Newton-John's album of the same name. In 1978, he wrote an amusing cult dance hit for Patti LaBelle titled "Eyes in the Back of My Head", featured on her Tasty album. Wingfield also played keyboards with The Hollies during this period (1975-1980). In 1980, he produced Searching for the Young Soul Rebels the first album by Dexys Midnight Runners. In the 1980s, Wingfield teamed with the film producer Mel Brooks, and co-wrote the songs "It's Good to Be the King" and "To Be or Not to Be". In 1985, he produced the Kane Gang's debut album Bad and Lowdown World of the Kane Gang. Three years later his production credits appeared on The Proclaimers UK Top 20 hit "I'm Gonna Be" and their album Sunshine on Leith.

The Pasadenas' 1988 song "Tribute (Right On)" was written by Wingfield.

Wingfield played with Van Morrison at the 1974 Montreux Jazz Festival, which was one of the two shows featured on Morrison's first DVD (2006). Several years later, Wingfield also did a summer tour of Europe with Morrison's band, featuring the songs from the latter's 1979 album, Into the Music. Beginning with their 1983 reunion shows, Wingfield spent 18 years handling keyboard duties for The Everly Brothers.

He also played on sessions for The Housemartins, Level 42, The Beautiful South, Van Morrison, Interview, Jimmy Witherspoon, Freddie King, Buddy Guy and Paul McCartney on his Run Devil Run album and Shakin' Stevens on two tracks of his Give Me Your Heart Tonight album released in 1982.

== See also ==
- List of 1970s one-hit wonders in the United States
- List of performers on Top of the Pops
- List of blue-eyed soul artists
