= Old and Wise =

Single by The Alan Parsons Project

from the album Eye in the Sky
- B-side: "Children of the Moon"
- Released: December 1982
- Recorded: Late 1981
- Genre: Soft rock
- Length: Single: 4:55; Album: 5:06; 7" single: 4:09
- Label: Arista
- Songwriters: Alan Parsons, Eric Woolfson
- Producers: Alan Parsons, Eric Woolfson

The Alan Parsons Project singles chronology
"Psychobabble" (1982)	"Old and Wise" (1982)	"You Don't Believe" (1983)

"Old and Wise" is a ballad by the Alan Parsons Project from the album Eye in the Sky, released as a single in 1982. The song reached number 74 in the United Kingdom, the first of the band's singles to chart in that country.

== Background ==
The lead vocal on the original release of "Old and Wise" was performed by former Zombies vocalist Colin Blunstone. Blunstone made several appearances on Alan Parsons Project albums, but "Old and Wise" was their only single with Blunstone as lead singer. Blunstone later re-recorded the song for his own two-disc compilation album, titled Old and Wise, released in 2003.

Alan Parsons applied a de-esser to the track during the mastering stage of production with the intent of attenuating some of the "s" syllables in the vocals. For earlier vinyl edition of Eye in the Sky, this process resulted in the reduction of higher frequencies in some of the instruments, particularly the snare drum. Parsons revisited the track for the 35th anniversary edition of Eye in the Sky to ensure that the de-esser was exclusively applied to the vocals. An early version (without orchestration or the saxophone solo) featuring Eric Woolfson singing a guide vocal was included as one of the bonus tracks on the 2007 remastered edition of Eye in the Sky.

Discussing the lyrics, Woolfson commented that "the problem with writing songs like 'Old and Wise' is that superficially they might be interpreted as being downers. That really wasn't the intention here at all. The idea was actually to be uplifting. The pathos of the lyric actually leaves me with a feeling of contentment, rather than a feeling of despair".

"Old and Wise" began to receive airplay in the United Kingdom in November 1982 and debuted at No. 79 on the Record Business Top 100 airplay chart. In the 6 December 1982 edition of the publication, Record Business reviewed the single, saying that it was "subjected to a slightly overblown production job, but Blunstone's impressive singing could prove to be the trump card here."

== Personnel ==
- Colin Blunstone – lead vocals
- Eric Woolfson – piano, organ
- Ian Bairnson – guitars
- David Paton – bass guitar
- Stuart Elliott – drums
- Mel Collins – saxophone solo
- Andrew Powell – orchestral arrangement and conductor

== Chart performance ==
Chart (1982–1983)	Position
Belgium (Ultratop 50 Flanders)	31
Netherlands (Single Top 100)	19
UK Singles (Official Charts)	74
