= Pass It On (Bryn Haworth album) =

Studio album by Bryn Haworth
- Released: 1984
- Recorded: January 1983; Chapel Lane Studios, Hereford
- Genre: Folk, Gospel, R&B
- Label: Chapel Lane CLS 8012
- Producer: Bryn Haworth

Bryn Haworth chronology
The Gap (1980)	Pass It On (1984)	Wings of the Morning (1984)

Pass It On is a studio album by Bryn Haworth.

== Track listing ==
All tracks composed by Bryn Haworth

1. "Pass It On"
2. "Never Give Up On Love"
3. "Come Away"
4. "Think For Yourself"
5. "Perfect Love"
6. "The Cure"
7. "Peace and Understanding"
8. "Looking Through Different Eyes"
9. "Come Over To My Place"
10. "Fear God"

== Personnel ==
- Henry Spinetti - drums
- Dave Markee - bass
- Pete Wingfield - piano, keyboards
- Bryn Haworth - guitar, vocals, Roland guitar synthesizer
- Steve Gregory - saxophone
- Peter Thomas - trombone
- Paul D'Oliveira - trumpet
- Dave Charles - congas, cabasa
- John David - back-up vocals
- Fran Byrne - drums
- Terry "Tex" Comer - bass
- Bam King - rhythm guitar
