= The Gap (Bryn Haworth album) =

Studio album by Bryn Haworth
- Released: 1980
- Recorded: 1980
- Studio: Chapel Lane Studios, Hampton Bishop, Herefordshire
- Genre: R&B, gospel, folk
- Label: Chapel Lane KMCD 854
- Producer: Bryn Haworth, Dave Markee

Bryn Haworth chronology
Keep the Ball Rolling (1979)	The Gap (1980)	12 Classics (1981)

The Gap is the fifth studio album by Bryn Haworth.

The album was recorded with the backing musicians from the Eric Clapton Band - Dave Markee, Chris Stainton, Henry Spinetti and Bruce Rowland. It was later released in the US on the Star Song label (SSR—0037) in a different cover, with the "Larry Norman Presents" tag.

== Track listing ==
All tracks composed by Bryn Haworth; except where indicated

1. "The Gap"
2. "Egypt"
3. "I Can Do All Things"
4. "New World Coming"
5. "It Would Have Been Me"
6. "Power of the Holy Spirit"
7. "More of You"
8. "New Jerusalem" (Haworth, Dave Markee)
9. "No Time"
10. "Send Down the Rain" (Haworth, Gordon Haskell)

== Personnel ==
- Bryn Haworth - guitar, mandolin, harpolek, vocals
- Henry Spinetti - drums
- Dave Markee - bass, mandocello
- Chris Stainton - keyboards
- Bruce Rowland - percussion

Technical

- Bryn Haworth, Dave Markee - producer
- Paul Cobbold - engineer

The album was digitally re-mastered and re-released in July 2008 on Chapel Lane Records (KMCD 854).
