= Grand Arrival =

Studio album by Bryn Haworth
- Released: 1978
- Recorded: 1975
- Studio: Crazy Mama's, Nashville
- Genre: Folk, Gospel, R&B
- Label: A&M AMLH 68462
- Producer: Audie Ashworth

Bryn Haworth chronology
Sunny Side of the Street (1975)	Grand Arrival (1978)	Keep the Ball Rolling (1979)

Grand Arrival is the third studio album by Bryn Haworth, released on the A&M Records label. The songs "We're All One" and "Woman Friend" were released as singles (AMS 7361 and AMS 7371 respectively).

The album is now deleted from the A&M Records catalogue.

== Track listing ==
All tracks are written by Bryn Haworth

Side one
No.	Title	Length
1.	"Come See What Love"	4:28
2.	"Nothing Without You"	3:41
3.	"Woman Friend"	3:00
4.	"Moments"	3:00
5.	"We're All One"	4:13

Side two
No.	Title	Length
6.	"The Grand Arrival"	4:42
7.	"Sing To The Lord"	3:42
8.	"Full Day"	3:28
9.	"Summer Wine"	4:28
10.	"Beans on Toast"	4:43

== Personnel ==
=== Musicians ===
- Guitar – Harold Bradley, Curtis Burch, Bryn Haworth, Ronny Light, Billy Sanford. Steel guitar: Buddy Emmons
- Banjo – Courtney Johnson. Zither: Bryn Haworth
- Mandolin – Sam Bush, Bryn Haworth
- Bass – Jesse Boyce, Tommy Cogbill, John Cowan, Joe Osborn, Nick Rather
- Keyboards – Ron Oates, Hargus "Pig" Robbins, Bobby Wood
- Drums – Jerry Carrigan, Buddy Harman, Karl Himmel
- Percussion – Jerry Carrigan, Farrell Morris
- Saxophone – Andrew Love, Billy Puett
- Trumpet – Wayne Jackson, George Tidwell. Trombone: Dennis Good
- Strings – Sheldon Kurland Strings: George Binkley, Marvin Chantry, Roy Christensen, Carl Gorodetzky,
  Lennie Haight, Sheldon Kurland, Willi Lehmann, Dennis Molchan, Steven Smith, Samuel Terranova, Gary Vanosdale
- Backing Vocals – Don Everly, The Holladay Sisters, The Imperials

=== Production staff ===
- Production – Audie Ashworth, for Audigram Inc.
- Engineering – Ronny Light
- Remixing – Chris Kimsey
- Recorded at – Crazy Mamas, Nashville
- Remixed at – Olympic Studios and Basing Street Studios, London
- Design and art direction – Michael Ross
- Photography – Gered Mankowitz
- Sunrise – Virginia Fass

== Packaging ==
The original paper inner sleeve for the vinyl record carried the lyrics and credits on one side and was printed, on the other side, with a reverse silhouette of the sunrise in the shape of a flying dove.
