= Eye in the Sky (song) =

1982 song by The Alan Parsons Project

Single by the Alan Parsons Project

from the album Eye in the Sky
- B-side: "Mammagamma"; "Gemini"
- Released: May 1982
- Recorded: Late 1981
- Studio: Abbey Road, London
- Genre: Pop rock; art pop; yacht rock
- Length: 4:36 (album version); 3:55 (7-inch version)
- Label: Arista
- Songwriters: Alan Parsons; Eric Woolfson
- Producers: Alan Parsons; Eric Woolfson

The Alan Parsons Project singles chronology
"Snake Eyes" (1981)	"Sirius" / "Eye in the Sky" / "Mammagamma" (1982)	"Psychobabble" (1982)

"Eye in the Sky" is a 1982 song by the British rock duo the Alan Parsons Project, included as the second track on their sixth studio album, Eye in the Sky, both released in May of that year. It was written and produced by Alan Parsons and Eric Woolfson, with the latter also handling the song's lead vocals.

The instrumental piece "Sirius" segues into "Eye in the Sky" on the album. For the single release, "Eye in the Sky" appears on its own, with "Sirius" edited out. Upon its release, "Eye in the Sky reached the top ten in several countries, including number one in Canada.

== Background ==
The song was inspired by Eric Woolfson's thoughts on surveillance and religion. Parsons recalled being initially lukewarm about the song as he had encountered difficulties finding a suitable approach to tie the arrangement together. At one point, Parsons considered discarding the song entirely, but ultimately settled on a chugging part that salvaged the song in Parson's mind.

In several countries, "Eye in the Sky" was released as the lead single from their 1982 album of the same name. It entered the US Billboard Hot 100 chart at No. 85 on 3 July 1982. By September, "Eye in the Sky" entered the top ten of the Billboard Hot 100, eclipsing "Time" as their highest charting song on that listing. The following month, "Eye in the Sky" achieved a peak position of No. 3. The song also reached No. 1 in both Canada and Spain, and also peaked at No. 6 in New Zealand, becoming their most successful release.

In 2019, Alan Parsons recorded a version in Catalan, under the title "Seré els teus ulls al camí" ("I'll be your eyes on the road"), for the CD edited by La Marató de TV3, a telethon devoted to raising funds for the research of incurable diseases.

== Personnel ==
- Alan Parsons – Fairlight CMI, production, engineering
- Eric Woolfson – Wurlitzer electric piano, lead and backing vocals, production
- Ian Bairnson – acoustic and electric guitars
- David Paton – bass
- Stuart Elliott – drums
- Chris Rainbow – backing vocals

== Charts ==
=== Weekly charts ===
Weekly chart performance for "Eye in the Sky"
Charts (1982)	Peak position
Australian Kent Music Report	22
Canadian RPM Top Singles	1
Canadian RPM Top Adult Contemporary	7
French Singles Chart	16
Germany (Official German Charts)	38
Italy (Musica e Dischi)	3
New Zealand (Recorded Music NZ)	6
Spain (AFYVE)	1
US Billboard Hot 100	3
US Cashbox Top 100	3
US Adult Contemporary (Billboard)	3
US Mainstream Rock (Billboard)	11

2025 weekly chart performance
Chart (2025)	Peak position
Israel International Airplay (Media Forest)	19

2026 weekly chart performance
Chart (2026)	Peak position
Israel International Airplay (Media Forest)	18

=== Year-end charts ===
1982 year-end chart performance for "Eye in the Sky"
Chart (1982)	Rank
Canadian RPM Top Singles	31
Spanish Singles Chart	1
US Billboard Hot 100	32
US Cashbox Top 100	28

== Certifications ==
Certifications and sales for "Eye in the Sky"
Region	Certification	Certified units/sales
Canada (Music Canada)	Gold	50,000^{^}
Italy (FIMI)	Gold	25,000^{‡}
New Zealand (RMNZ)	Platinum	30,000^{‡}
Spain (Promusicae)	Gold	25,000^{^}
United States (RIAA)	Gold	500,000^{‡}
^{^} Shipments figures based on certification alone.^{‡} Sales+streaming figures based on certification alone.
