= Eye in the Sky (album) =

1982 studio album by the Alan Parsons Project

- Cover art featuring an Eye of Ra

Studio album by the Alan Parsons Project
- Released: May 1982
- Recorded: 1981–1982
- Studios: Abbey Road Studios, London
- Genres: Progressive rock; progressive pop; soft rock
- Length: 42:30
- Label: Arista
- Producer: Alan Parsons

The Alan Parsons Project chronology
The Turn of a Friendly Card (1980)	Eye in the Sky (1982)	Ammonia Avenue (1984)

Singles from Eye in the Sky
- 1. "Eye in the Sky" Released: May 1982; 2. "Psychobabble" Released: November 1982 (US); 3. "Old and Wise" Released: December 1982

Eye in the Sky is the sixth studio album by British rock duo the Alan Parsons Project, released in May 1982 by Arista Records. At the 25th Annual Grammy Awards in 1983, Eye in the Sky was nominated for the Grammy Award for Best Engineered Album. In 2019, the album won the Grammy Award for Best Immersive Audio Album at the 61st Annual Grammy Awards. Eye in the Sky was the band's last album to be certified Platinum in the United States by the RIAA.

== Background ==
Eye in the Sky is the first of three albums that were recorded by the Project on analogue equipment and mixed directly to a Sony PCM 1610 digital master tape along with the usual analogue half-inch 30 ips master tape. In 2007, the analogue tape was re-digitised for audiophile formats.

In a 2026 interview, David Paton, who served as a bassist and vocalist for these recording sessions, said that Eye in the Sky was "probably the pinnacle" of the band's discography and that "everybody was really focused." He remembered that he encountered difficulties with mastering the lead vocal take for "Children of the Moon" and also called it his favourite song that he sang with the band.

== Release ==
To promote the album in the United States, the band conducted interviews that were aired on NBC during the weekend of Memorial Day. At that time, Eye in the Sky had yet to be released in the United States.

The album itself reached the top 10 in numerous countries, including No 1 in Austria and Germany. The album's title track became the Alan Parsons Project's biggest hit on the US Billboard Hot 100, where it reached No. 3. The album features the instrumental piece "Sirius", which has become a staple of many college and professional sporting arenas throughout North America. It was used by the Chicago Bulls to introduce its starting line-up during its championship years of the 1990s and has seen continued use thereafter.

On 1 December 2017, a 35th-anniversary-edition box set of the album was released, for which Alan Parsons, along with surround mastering engineers Dave Donnelly and PJ Olsson, won the Grammy Award for Best Immersive Audio Album at the 61st Annual Grammy Awards. A Blu-ray audio version of the album in 5.1 surround sound was also released the following year. When discussing this edition of the album, Parsons mentioned that they "managed to lay our hands on everything that was necessary to perform the surround mix" with the exception of "You're Gonna Get Your Fingers Burned", where Parsons and his team were unable to locate one of the tapes containing some of the multi-tracks.

== Reception ==
Professional ratings
Review scores
Source	Rating
AllMusic	4.5/5 stars
The Philadelphia Inquirer	1/5 stars

From contemporary reviews, Ken Tucker of The Philadelphia Inquirer gave the album a one star rating out of five rating, calling it a "hopelessly banal album" with "Paul McCartney-as-manic-depressive melodies and whining vocals would be merely pathetic were it not for Parsons' lyric pretensions". Billboard was complimentary of the album artwork and said that the music was "in the tradition of Pink Floyd's orchestrally and technically perfect pop/rock progressivism."

From retrospective reviews, Stephen Thomas Erlewine of AllMusic stated that "this is a soft rock album through and through, one that's about melodic hooks and texture," noting that "with the exception of those instrumentals and the galloping suite "Silence and I," all the artiness was part of the idea of this album was pushed into the lyrics, so the album plays as soft pop album—and a very, very good one at that [...] it adds up to arguably the most consistent Alan Parsons Project album—perhaps not in terms of concept, but in terms of music they never were as satisfying as they were here."

== Track listing ==
All songs written and composed by Alan Parsons and Eric Woolfson.

Side one
No.	Title	Lead vocals	Length
1.	"Sirius"	Instrumental	1:54
2.	"Eye in the Sky"	Eric Woolfson	4:36
3.	"Children of the Moon"	David Paton	4:51
4.	"Gemini"	Chris Rainbow	2:11
5.	"Silence and I"	Eric Woolfson	7:19

Side two
No.	Title	Lead vocals	Length
6.	"You're Gonna Get Your Fingers Burned"	Lenny Zakatek	4:22
7.	"Psychobabble"	Elmer Gantry	4:51
8.	"Mammagamma"	Instrumental	3:34
9.	"Step by Step"	Lenny Zakatek	3:54
10.	"Old and Wise"	Colin Blunstone	4:55

2007 remaster bonus tracks
No.	Title	Lead vocals	Length
11.	"Sirius" (Demo)	Instrumental Demo	1:56
12.	"Old and Wise"	Eric Woolfson	4:43
13.	"Any Other Day" (Eric Woolfson) (studio demo)	None	1:42
14.	"Silence and I"	Eric Woolfson	7:33
15.	"The Naked Eye"	Instrumental	10:49
16.	"Eye Pieces" (Classical Naked Eye)	Instrumental	7:51

== Personnel ==
- Alan Parsons – keyboards, Fairlight, programming, Linn drum machine, backing vocals (9)
- Eric Woolfson – Wurlitzer, keyboards, piano, organ, vocals (2 and 5), backing vocals
- David Paton – bass, vocals (3)
- Ian Bairnson – acoustic & electric guitars, pedal steel guitar
- Stuart Elliott – drums, percussion
- John Wallace – piccolo trumpet (3)
- Mel Collins – saxophone (10)
- Chris Rainbow – vocals (4)
- Lenny Zakatek – vocals and vocal FX (6 and 9), backing vocals (6)
- Colin Blunstone – vocals (10)
- Dave Terry (credited as Elmer Gantry) – vocals (7)
- Andrew Powell – additional piano (5), Brass Band and Orchestra arrangements, conductor
- Bob Howes – chorus master of The English Chorale

== Charts ==
=== Weekly charts ===
Chart (1982–1983)	Peak position
Australian Albums (Kent Music Report)	4
Austrian Albums (Ö3 Austria)	1
Canada Top Albums/CDs (RPM)	3
Dutch Albums (Album Top 100)	4
German Albums (Offizielle Top 100)	1
Italian Albums (Musica e Dischi)	2
New Zealand Albums (RMNZ)	3
Norwegian Albums (VG-lista)	3
Spanish Albums (AFYVE)	1
Swedish Albums (Sverigetopplistan)	8
UK Albums (Official Charts)	27
US Billboard 200	7

=== Year-end charts ===
Chart (1982)	Position
Austrian Albums (Ö3 Austria)	6
Canada Top Albums/CDs (RPM)	11
Dutch Albums (Album Top 100)	22
German Albums (Offizielle Top 100)	9
Italian Albums (Musica e dischi)	3
New Zealand Albums (RMNZ)	1
US Billboard 200	76

== Certifications and sales ==
Region	Certification	Certified units/sales
Australia (ARIA)	Platinum	50,000^{^}
Canada (Music Canada)	2× Platinum	200,000^{^}
France (SNEP)	Platinum	400,000^{*}
Germany (BVMI)	Gold	250,000^{^}
Italy (FIMI)	Gold	25,000^{‡}
Netherlands (NVPI)	Gold	50,000^{^}
New Zealand (RMNZ)	Platinum	15,000^{^}
Spain (Promusicae)	Platinum	100,000^{^}
United Kingdom (BPI)	Silver	60,000^{^}
United States (RIAA)	Platinum	1,000,000^{^}
^{*} Sales figures based on certification alone.^{^} Shipments figures based on certification alone.^{‡} Sales+streaming figures based on certification alone.
