= Colin Blunstone =

English singer and songwriter (born 1945)

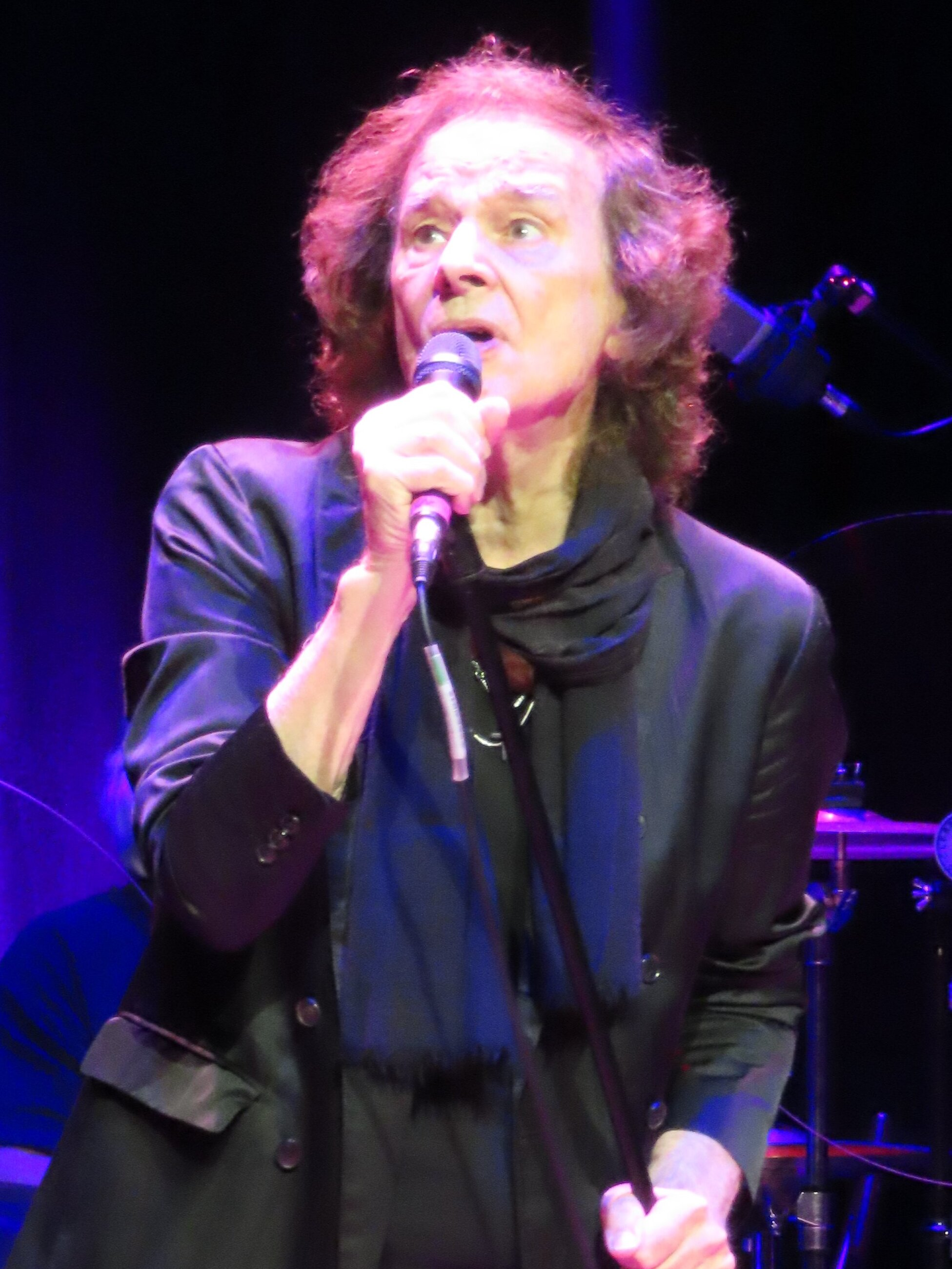
- Blunstone performing in 2024

Background information
- Also known as: Neil MacArthur
- Born: Colin Edward Michael Blunstone; 24 June 1945 (age 80); Hatfield, Hertfordshire, England
- Genres: Rock; pop
- Occupations: Singer; songwriter
- Instruments: Vocals; guitar; tambourine
- Years active: 1958–present
- Labels: Epic; Decca; CBS; Deram; Stiff
- Website: colinblunstone.net

Colin Edward Michael Blunstone (born 24 June 1945) is an English singer and songwriter. In a career spanning more than 60 years, Blunstone came to prominence in the mid-1960s as the lead singer of the rock band the Zombies, which released four singles that entered the Top 75 charts in the United States during the 1960s: "She's Not There", "Tell Her No", "She's Coming Home" and "Time of the Season". Blunstone began his solo career in 1969, releasing three singles under a pseudonym of Neil MacArthur. Since then, he has released ten studio albums under his real name. He was also a recurring guest vocalist with the Alan Parsons Project, appearing on four of their albums between 1978 and 1985.

In 2019, Blunstone was inducted into the Rock and Roll Hall of Fame as part of the Zombies.

== Early years ==
Colin Edward Michael Blunstone was born on 24 June 1945, in Hatfield, Hertfordshire and raised as the only son of Arthur and Dorothy Blunstone (née Mahn). "I was adopted", Blunstone has said, "and my mother was the sister of my birth mother". After Blunstone's birth mother became pregnant, she went to live with Arthur and Dorothy in order to conceal the pregnancy from her family. She stayed with the couple for several months until she gave birth and then returned to her family. At an early age, Blunstone was told he had been adopted, but the identity of his birth mother was not revealed until he was nearly 30 years old, when his 'aunt' — who was in actuality his birth mother — revealed that she had had a brief affair with an American serviceman during the Second World War, which led to the pregnancy. Blunstone’s birth father was injured in France and sent back to the United States.

Arthur was an aeronautical engineer at the De Havilland factory at Hatfield who later ran a hairdressing business before returning to work for De Havilland. Dorothy was a former dancer who also worked for De Havilland. Notwithstanding postwar privations, Blunstone recalled that although his family were not well-off, his parents never owning a car, they had a pleasant lifestyle in rural Hertfordshire. He noted that "as a band we gave off that aura of being middle-class... maybe a couple of the guys' families were comfortable, but the others' weren't. Because of where we came from we talk in a particular way. That... sounded a bit like BBC accents... My parents weren't wealthy at all. We may have been middle-class by aspiration, but not by income." He attended St Albans County Grammar School for Boys.

When he was ten, Blunstone acquired a radio, which he would frequently use to listen to Radio Luxembourg. The first record he ever bought was "Heartbreak Hotel" by Elvis Presley. Other favourite artists included Little Richard, Chuck Berry, and Ricky Nelson.

== The Zombies ==
Rod Argent, Paul Atkinson, and Hugh Grundy first played together at a jam on Easter 1961 in St Albans, Hertfordshire. Rod Argent wanted to form a band and initially asked his cousin Jim Rodford to join as a bass guitarist. Rodford was playing in local band called the Bluetones at the time, so declined. Paul Arnold, Blunstone's classmate and a friend of Argent, personally invited him to join what would later become the Zombies. Blunstone and Arnold (who would take up bass but leave shortly thereafter) joined in early 1961, while all five members were still at school. Blunstone was originally recruited as a rhythm guitarist and showed up to his first rehearsal with two black eyes from playing rugby. Eventually, Argent opted to relinquish his lead vocal duties in favour of Blunstone.

After they won a local contest, they recorded a demo as their prize. Rod Argent's song "She's Not There" got them a recording contract with Decca. "She's Not There" would go on to be a worldwide hit, with the band appearing on shows such as Top of the Pops and Hullabaloo, among many others. Another hit by the group was "Tell Her No".

Blunstone's voice was considered one of the main factors in making the Zombies' single, "She's Not There". In 1968, the band broke up over management issues, shortly after completing the baroque pop classic album Odessey and Oracle. One of the songs from Odessey and Oracle, "Time of the Season", would become one of the band's most acclaimed hits.

In 2004, Blunstone and Rod Argent recorded As Far as I Can See..., a new album in the style of the Zombies. A later album and DVD Colin Blunstone & Rod Argent of the Zombies Live at the Bloomsbury Theatre were well received, as was their 2007 US tour. One critic wrote, "The Zombies, still led by original keyboard wizard Rod Argent and featuring the smoked-silk vocals of Colin Blunstone, is the best 60s band still touring which doesn't have Mick Jagger as a front man".

Blunstone continued to tour with Argent as the Zombies, and in April 2009 the original surviving members of the band played four reunion concerts performing Odessey and Oracle. Blunstone and Rod Argent decided to put together a touring band, perform live and release new material as The Zombies. Jim Rodford (Argent, The Kinks) was on bass, Steve Rodford on drums and Keith Airey on guitar. Airey left and was replaced by Tom Toomey. After the death of Jim Rodford in 2018, Søren Koch became the Zombies' new bass player. In a 2015 article for PopMatters, journalist J.C. Maçek III quoted Argent about the Zombies' latest album Still Got That Hunger. Argent said, "Still Got That Hunger is the first album that has really recaptured some of the resonance of feeling of a group. We're so tight as a group together now. And the whole process has become so organic that we're 100% happy with the Zombies name and rediscovering and playing all the old stuff and at the same time carving a new path forward which is also very, very important to us."

In 2012, Blunstone participated in the unveiling of a Blue Plaque at the Blacksmith's Arms, a St. Albans pub where the Zombies met for their first rehearsal.

In 2019, Blunstone was inducted into the Rock and Roll Hall of Fame as part of the Zombies, along with Argent, Atkinson (posthumously), White, and Grundy.

== Solo career ==
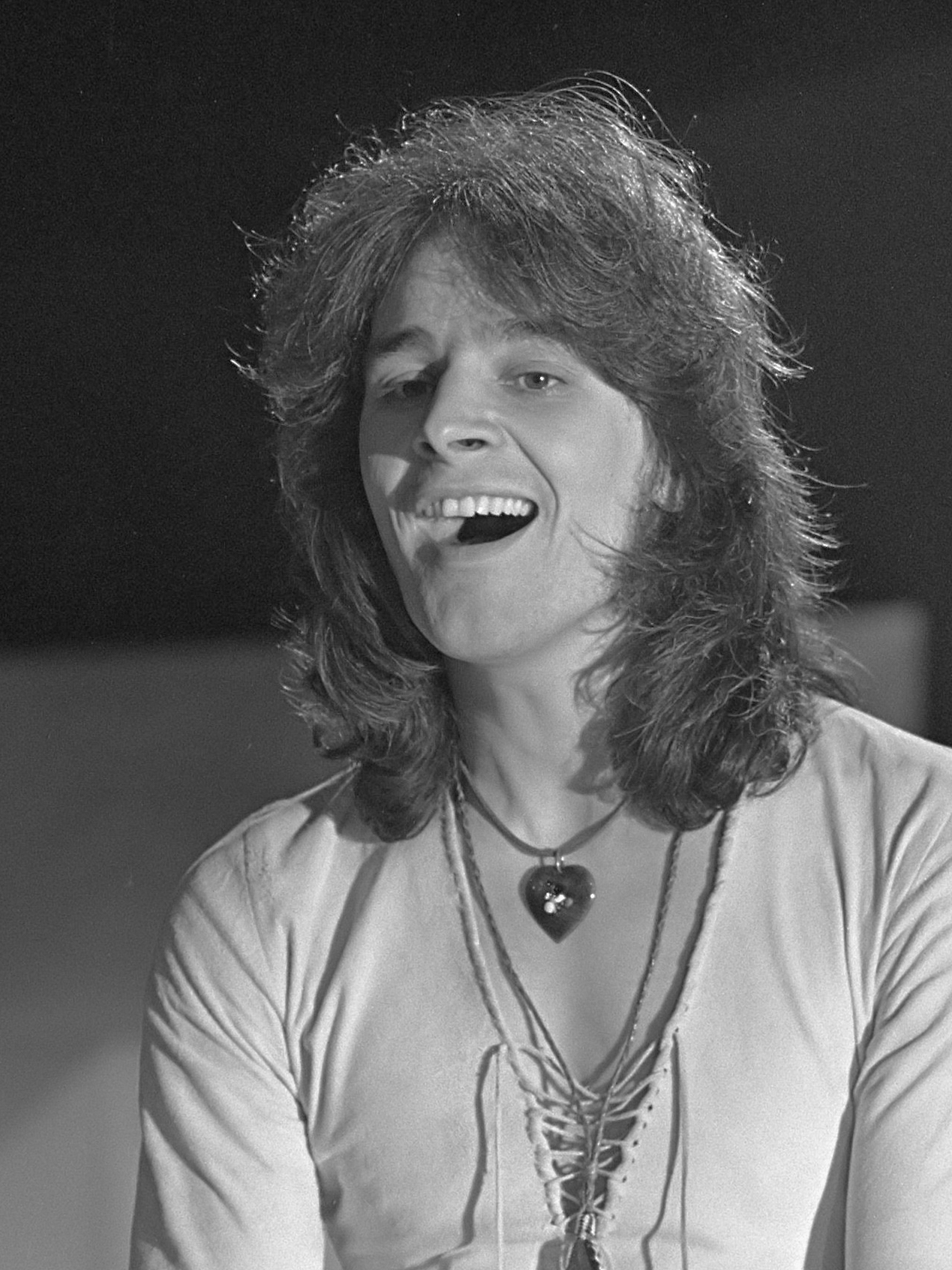
Colin Blunstone, TopPop television programme, 1973

Blunstone briefly worked as a clerk in the insurance business before resuming his musical career. In 1969, he signed with Deram and released three singles under the pseudonym of Neil MacArthur, including a re-make of "She's Not There", which charted in the UK.

Blunstone gained success as a solo artist in 1972 with "Say You Don't Mind" (which peaked at number 15 in the UK chart and was written by former Moody Blues and future Wings member Denny Laine), and "I Don't Believe in Miracles" (which peaked at number 31 in the UK chart and written by Argent member Russ Ballard), both with string arrangements by Christopher Gunning. Additional minor hits followed with "How Could We Dare to Be Wrong" in early 1973 (which peaked at number 45 in the UK chart) and "The Tracks of My Tears" in 1982 (which peaked at number 60 in the UK chart).

One Year (1971), produced by Chris White and Rod Argent was Blunstone's debut solo album, and included the song "Caroline Goodbye". The album also featured new material written by Argent and White. This was followed by Ennismore and Journey. He then signed a recording contract with Elton John's record label, The Rocket Record Company, and released three studio albums: Planes (1976); Never Even Thought (1978); and Late Nights in Soho (1979) which was only released in Europe. Blunstone also contributed to Dave Stewart's hit cover version of "What Becomes of the Brokenhearted" (1980). He went on to appear on several albums by the Alan Parsons Project including Eye in the Sky, where he sings the hit single "Old and Wise", and Ammonia Avenue ("Dancing on a Highwire"). In 1984, he joined with other Parsons musicians, most notably David Paton of PILOT/Parsons to form Keats.

His ninth solo album The Ghost of You and Me was released in the UK, Benelux, and Scandinavia on 9 March 2009. Blunstone completed a twelve date UK tour, his first in several years. He continued to tour with Rod Argent as the Zombies, and the original surviving members of the band played four reunion concerts performing Odessey and Oracle, in April 2009. In 2010, Sony released Colin Blunstone Original Album Classics, a 3-disc boxed set featuring digitally re-mastered versions of Blunstone's solo albums One Year, Journey and Ennismore. The collection also includes two bonus tracks that were originally released as non-LP b-sides in UK.

Blunstone continues to be active, occasionally in tours with 1960s bands such as Manfred Mann, often collaborating with Rod Argent. Some of his more recent albums are As Far as I Can See, the mid-1990s Echo Bridge and Out of the Shadows (with Rod Argent). In 2024, he toured in the UK with a band comprising Søren Koch on lead and acoustic guitar, Dave Bainbridge on keyboards, Chas Cronk on bass and Steve Rodford on drums. For their second set, a string quartet, Q Strings, joined them on stage to perform Blunstone's first solo album One Year in its entirety.

=== Radio, television and film ===
Blunstone has appeared many times on radio and television shows in the UK and on soundtracks. He and his band performed several sessions for John Peel and Johnnie Walker, and on The Old Grey Whistle Test in 1971, where he performed live with a string quartet.

Blunstone appeared in The Savages (2001) and Keep the Aspidistra Flying (1997) both as a singer. Other TV appearances include The Dan and Dusty Show (2004) as the Zombies, Shindig! Presents British Invasion Vol. 2 (1992) also as the Zombies, and Pop Quiz (1982). His sole film part was in Bunny Lake Is Missing (1965), directed by Otto Preminger (as the Zombies) and starring Laurence Olivier.

== Personal life ==
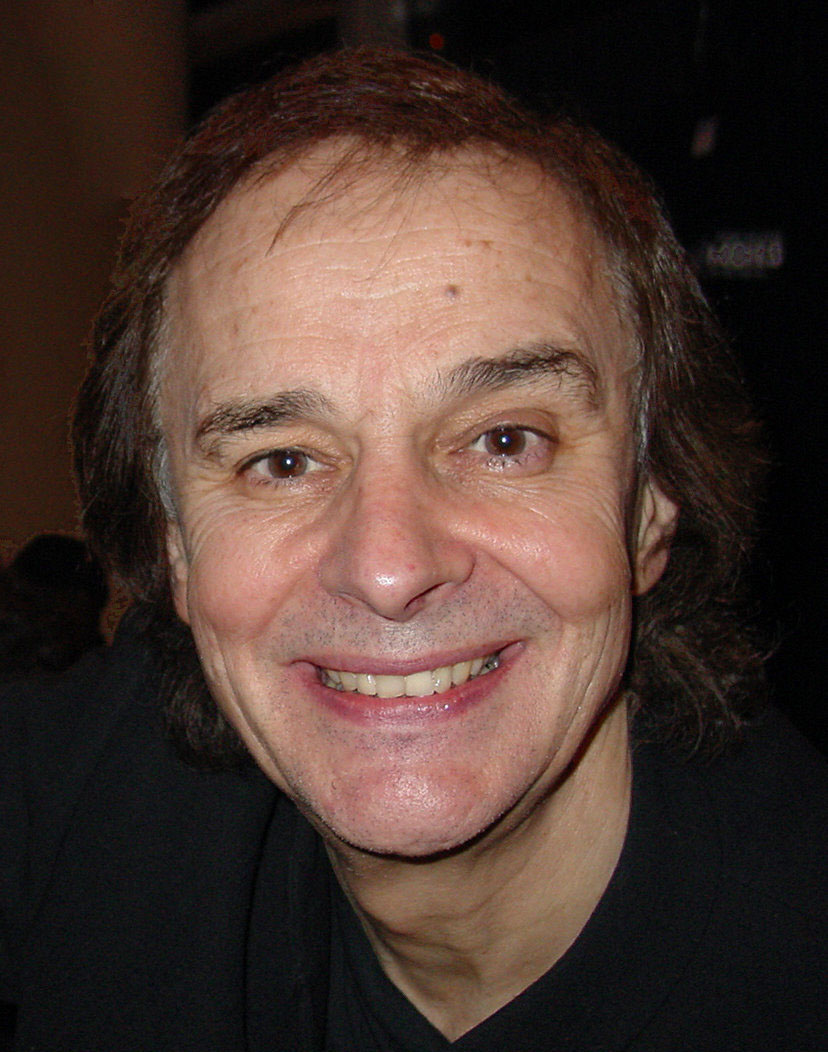
Blunstone in 2005

Blunstone is married to Suzy Blunstone, and the couple have a daughter.

== Discography ==
=== Band albums ===
- Argent-Blunstone – Out of the Shadows (2001) – Redhouse REDHCD

=== Solo albums ===
- One Year – Epic EPC64557 (1971)
- Ennismore – Epic EPC65278 (1972)
- Journey – Epic EPC65805 (1974)
- Planes – Epic EPC81592 (1977)
- Never Even Thought – Rocket BXL1-2903 (1978)
- Late Nights in Soho – Rocket (Netherlands) 9103 510 (1979)
- Sings His Greatest Hits – JSE Records – CLACD 351 (1991)
- Echo Bridge – Permanent PERMCD38 (1995)
- Live at the BBC (1996)
- The Light Inside – Mystic MYSCD125 (1998)
- The Ghost of You and Me – Ennismore ENNISCD1 (2009)
- On the Air Tonight – Ennismore ENNISCD2 (2012)
- That Same Year – recordings from 1971 (2021)

=== Compilations ===
- I Don't Believe In Miracles – CBS/Embassy (1979)
- Some Years : It's the Time of Colin Blunstone – Epic/Legacy 489487 2 (1995)
- Super Hits – Epic (2003)
- Greatest Hits + Plus – Mystic MYS CD194 (2006)
- The Best Of – Camden (2010)
- 3 Original Album Classics – Epic/Legacy/Sony (2010)
- Collected – Universal Music 534 274-2/4 (2014)

=== Singles ===
- "Mary, Won't You Warm My Bed" / "I Hope I Didn't Say Too Much Last Night" (1971), Epic
- "Caroline, Goodbye" / "Though You Are Far Away" (1971), Epic
- "Say You Don't Mind" / "Let Me Come Closer" (1972), Epic – UK No. 15
- "I Don't Believe in Miracles" / "I've Always Had You" (1972), Epic – UK No. 31
- "How Could We Dare to Be Wrong" / "Time's Running Out" (1973), Epic – UK No. 45
- "Wonderful" / "Beginning" (1973), Epic
- "It's Magical" / "Summersong" (1974), Epic
- "When You Close Your Eyes" / "Good Guys Don't Always Win" (1976), Epic
- "Planes" / "Dancing in the Dark" (1976), Epic
- "Beautiful You" / "It's Hard to Say Goodbye" (1977), Epic
- "Lovin' and Free" / "Dancing in the Dark" (1977), Epic
- "I'll Never Forget You" / "You Are the Way for Me" (1978), Epic
- "Ain't It Funny" / "Who's That Knocking?" (1978), Epic
- "Photograph" / "Touch and Go" (1978), Epic
- "What Becomes of the Brokenhearted" (with Dave Stewart) / "There Is No Reward" (1980), Stiff – UK No. 13 (AUS No. 34)
- "Miles Away" / "Excerpts from Exiled" (non-Blunstone B-side) (1981), Panache
- "The Tracks of My Tears" / "Last Goodbye" (1982), PRT – UK No. 60
- "Old and Wise" / "Children of the Moon" (The Alan Parsons Project release; Blunstone on lead vocals on "Old and Wise") (1982), Arista – UK No. 74
- "Touch" / "Touch" (instrumental) (1983), PRT
- "Where Do We Go from Here?" / "Helen Loves Paris" (1986), Sierra
- "She's Not There" / "Who Fires the Gun" (1986), Sierra
- "Cry an Ocean" / "Make It Easy" (1988), IRS
- "So Much More" (2012), Ennismore

=== As Neil MacArthur ===
- "She's Not There" / "World of Glass" (1969), Deram – UK No. 34
- "Don't Try to Explain" / "Without Her" (1969), Deram
- "It's Not Easy" / "12:29" (1969), Deram

=== Guest appearances ===
- The Alan Parsons Project – Pyramid (1978) – "The Eagle Will Rise Again"
- Mike Batt – Tarot Suite (1979) – "Losing Your Way in the Rain"
- Iva Twydell – Duel (1982) (backing vocals)
- The Alan Parsons Project – Eye in the Sky (1982) – "Old and Wise" (UK No. 74, US No. 22)
- Keats – Keats (1984)
- The Alan Parsons Project – Ammonia Avenue (1984) – "Dancing on a Highwire"
- The Alan Parsons Project – Vulture Culture (1985) – "Somebody Out There"
- The Crowd – You'll Never Walk Alone (1985)
- Don Airey – K2 (1989) – "Julie"
- Nadieh – No Way Back (1989) – "Splendid Morning" (duet)
- The Bolland Project – Darwin (The Evolution) (1991) – "The Way of the Evolution", "Emma My Dear"
- Just Like a Woman soundtrack (1992) – "Politics of Love"
- Split Second soundtrack (1992) – "Nights in White Satin"
- Heineken Night of the Proms '93 – "She's Not There"
- Time Code 64 W/ Colin Blunstone – Dance Trax (1993) – "She's Not There (Club Mix)"
- Duncan Browne – Songs of Love And War (1995) – "Misunderstood", "Love Leads You", "I Fall Again"
- Steve Hackett – Watcher of the Skies: Genesis Revisited (1996) – "For Absent Friends"
- Mike Batt – Keep the Aspidistra Flying (1998) – "Tiger in the Night"
- Mike Batt with The Royal Philharmonic Orchestra – Philharmania (1998 – released only in Germany) – "Owner of a Lonely Heart"
- Alan Parsons – The Time Machine (1999) – "Ignorance Is Bliss"
- Sir John Betjeman & Mike Read – Words & Music (2000) – "Peggy", "In Memory"
- Edward Rogers – Sunday Fables (2004) – "Make It Go Away" (backing vocals)
