= Christopher Gunning =

English composer (1944–2023)

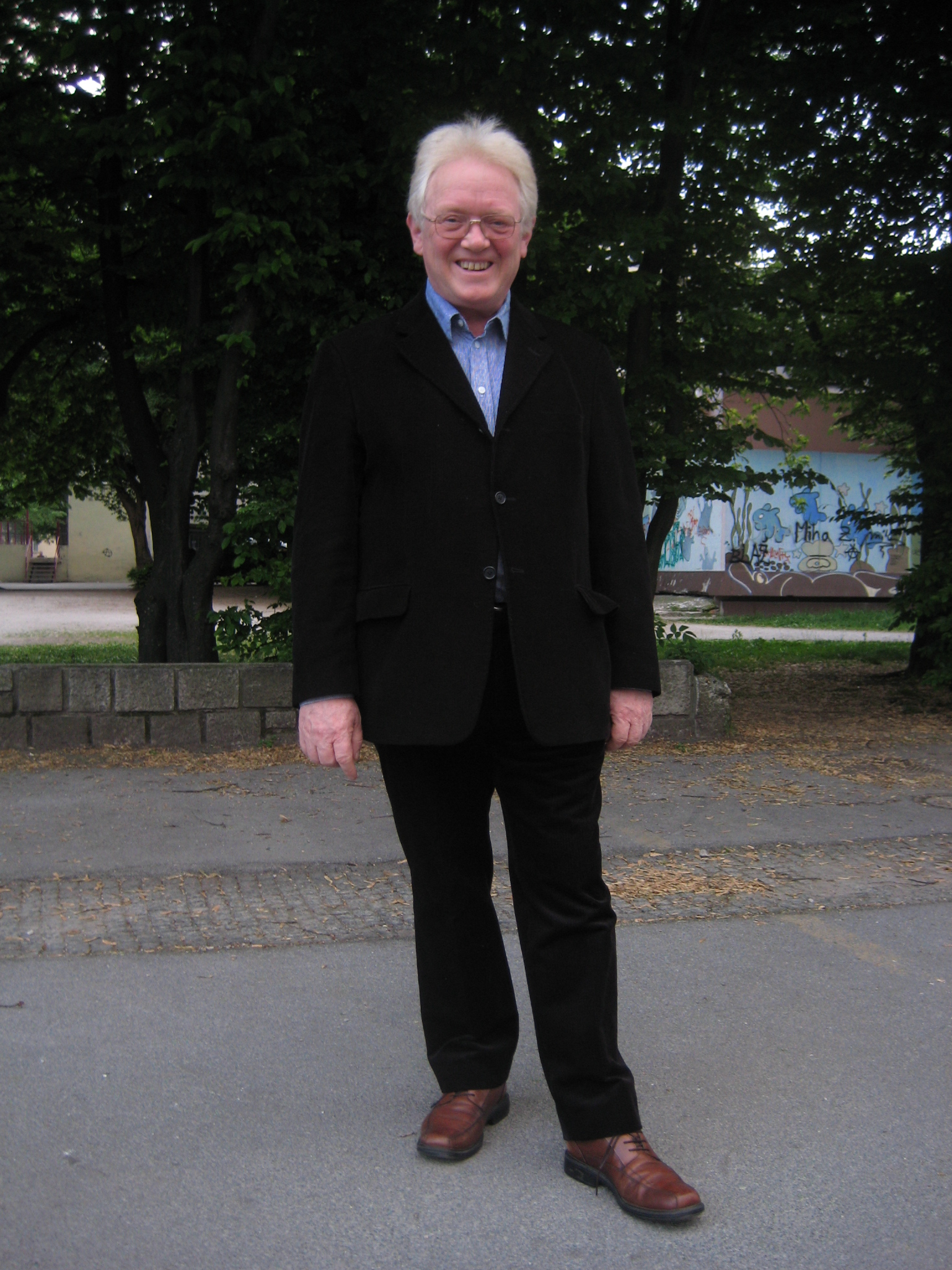
- Gunning in 2008

Background information
- Born: 5 August 1944; Cheltenham, Gloucestershire, England
- Died: 25 March 2023 (aged 78) Croxley Green, Hertfordshire, England
- Genres: Film score; classical
- Occupation: Composer
- Spouses: Annie Farrow (m. 1974; div. 1999); Svitlana Saienko (m. 2004)

Christopher Gunning (5 August 1944 – 25 March 2023) was an English composer of concert works and music for films and television.

== Early life ==
Gunning was born in Cheltenham, Gloucestershire on 5 August 1944, the younger of two sons. He grew up in Hendon, northwest London. His father was a pianist and educator from South Africa, and his mother had been one of his father's pupils. He studied at the Guildhall School of Music and Drama, where his tutors included Edmund Rubbra and Richard Rodney Bennett.

== Career ==
=== Film and television ===
Gunning's film and television compositions received many awards, including the 2007 BAFTA Award for Best Film Music for La Vie en Rose, as well as three additional awards for Agatha Christie's Poirot, Middlemarch, and Porterhouse Blue. He also won three Ivor Novello Awards, for the TV miniseries Rebecca, and the film scores for Under Suspicion (1991), and Firelight (1997). His other film scores included Goodbye Gemini (1970), Hands of the Ripper (1971), Ooh... You Are Awful (1972), the film version of Man About the House (1974), In Celebration (1975), Rogue Male (1976), Charlie Muffin (1979), Rise and Fall of Idi Amin (1981), Knights of God (1987), When the Whales Came (1989), Lighthouse Hill (2004) and Grace of Monaco (2014).

In the 1970s and 1980s, Gunning collaborated with rock musician Colin Blunstone and was responsible for the distinctive string arrangement on Blunstone's album One Year, including the 1972 hit "Say You Don't Mind". He also provided the string arrangements on "Won't Somebody Dance With Me", the Ivor Novello award-winning song written and performed by Lynsey De Paul as well as another of de Paul's hit singles "My Man and Me" and her 1974 album "Taste Me... Don't Waste Me". He was also repondible for the orchestral arrangements on "Don't Let Me Down", "Love Makes The World Go Round" and "The Air That I Breathe" from the 1974 album Hollies by The Hollies.

Gunning composed the music for nearly all of the Poirot TV films starring David Suchet, and worked on all three series of Rosemary and Thyme featuring Felicity Kendal and Pam Ferris. His New Yorkshire Theme was used as daily start-up music for Yorkshire Television from 1982 and an extract from that piece formed the theme to YTV's local news programme Calendar. His music for the Martini advertising campaign, heard around the world for thirty years, won three Clio Awards. The music he composed for Black Magic commercials, in 1971 and used for a further 15 years, became equally famous. Also (indicating Gunning's sense of humour and self-deprecation), his music for a Winalot Prime dog food commercial in 1988 was later expanded into The Long March and recorded and released as a charity record by the Barking Light Orchestra. Alongside his composing career, Gunning was an advocate for composers' rights through his involvement with the Performing Right Society (PRS), serving on its board for many years.

=== Concert music ===
In addition to performances of his television and film scores, Gunning's Concerto for Saxophone and Orchestra and The Lobster have been performed at various venues including London's Southbank Centre. The Saxophone Concerto, played by John Harle with the Academy of St. Martin in the Fields, has been released by Sanctuary Classics, The Lobster is available on the Meridian label, and the Piano Concerto, Symphony No. 1 and Storm have been released by Albany Records. Later works include concertos for the oboe and clarinet and the CD Skylines. The Royal Philharmonic Orchestra performed the premiere of Symphonies No.3 and No.4, coupled with Concerto for Oboe and String Orchestra. This has been released by Chandos Records.

Gunning completed thirteen symphonies between 2001 and 2020, several of which have been recorded by the Royal Philharmonic Orchestra conducted by the composer and released on Signum Classics. A commemorative concert was held at Cadogan Hall in London on 10 March 2024, with a live performance of his Symphony No 10 (2016) by the Royal Philharmonic Orchestra, as well as contributions from guitarist John Williams, saxophonist John Harle and singer songwriter Colin Blunstone.

=== Awards ===
In recognition of Gunning's contribution to music, he received a BASCA Gold Badge Award on 19 October 2011. As well as his many film awards listed above, Gunning's scores for The Big Battalions, Wild Africa, Cold Lazarus and When the Whales Came also received nominations for BAFTA and Ivor Novello Awards.

== Personal life ==
In 1974, Gunning married Annie Farrow; they had four daughters and divorced in 1999. He remarried in 2004, to Svitlana Saienko. He died from kidney cancer at his home in Croxley Green, Hertfordshire, on 25 March 2023, at the age of 78.
