= List of bass guitar manufacturers =

The bass guitar is similar in appearance and construction to an electric guitar but with a longer neck and scale length and most usually four strings.

This is a partial list of Wikipedia articles about companies (past and present) under which electric bass guitars have been sold.

== A ==
- Alembic
- Ampeg
- Aria
- Audiovox

== B ==
- B.C. Rich
- BassLab
- Breedlove Guitars

== C ==
- C. F. Martin & Company
- Carl Thompson (luthier)
- Carvin Corporation
- Charvel
- Cort Guitars
- Chapman Guitars

== D ==
- Daisy Rock Girl Guitars
- Danelectro
- Dean Guitars
- Dean Markley Strings
- Dingwall Designer Guitars

== E ==
- Eastwood Guitars
- Epiphone
- ESP Guitars

== F ==
- Fender
- Fernandes Guitars
- Fleabass
- Fodera
- Framus
- Fret-King

== G ==
- G&L Musical Instruments
- Gibson Guitar Corporation
- Godin Guitars
- Greco
- Greg Bennett Guitars
- Gretsch
- Guild

== H ==
- Hamer Guitars
- Hagström
- Höfner
- Hohner
- Hondo
- Hora

== I ==
- Ibanez
- Italia Guitars

== J ==
- Jay Turser Guitars
- Jens Ritter Instruments
- Jackson Guitars

== K ==
- Kawai
- Kiesel Guitars
- Kramer Guitars
- Kay Musical Instrument Company

== L ==
- Lado Guitars
- Lakland
- Line 6
- Luna Guitars

== M ==
- M.V. Pedulla Guitars
- Maton
- Mayones Guitars & Basses
- Michael Kelly Guitars
- Michael Tobias Design
- Micro-Frets
- Modulus Guitars
- Music Man

== N ==
- National Reso-Phonic Guitars

== O ==
- Ovation

== P ==
- Parker Guitars
- Paul Reed Smith Guitars
- Peavey
- Pensa Custom Guitars
- M.V. Pedulla Guitars

== R ==
- Reverend Guitars
- Rickenbacker
- Robin Guitars
- Ruokangas Guitars

== S ==
- Sadowsky
- Samick
- Schecter Guitars
- Spector
- Steinberger
- Suhr Guitars

== T ==
- Tacoma Guitars
- Tagima
- Takamine
- Tanglewood Guitars
- Taylor Guitars
- Tobias
- Tonante
- Tyler Guitars

== V ==
- Veillette Guitars
- Vigier Guitars
- Vintage Guitars
- Vox

== W ==
- Wal Basses
- Wandre Guitars
- Warwick
- Washburn Guitars
- Wechter Guitars

== Y ==
- Yamaha

== Z ==
- Zemaitis Guitars
- Zon Guitars
