= Acoustic bass guitar =

Type of acoustic instrument

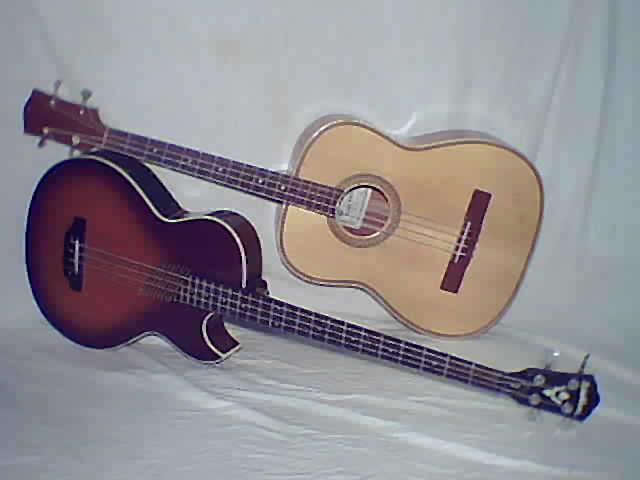
Two acoustic bass guitars

The acoustic bass guitar (sometimes shortened to acoustic bass or initialized ABG) is a bass instrument with a hollow wooden body similar to, though usually larger than, a steel-string acoustic guitar. Like the traditional electric bass guitar and the double bass, the acoustic bass guitar commonly has four strings usually tuned E-A-D-G, an octave below the lowest four strings of the 6-string guitar.

Because it can sometimes be difficult to hear an acoustic bass guitar without an amplifier even in settings with other acoustic instruments, most acoustic basses have pickups, either magnetic or piezoelectric or both, so they can be amplified with a bass amp.

Traditional music of Mexico features several varieties of acoustic bass guitars such as the guitarrón, a very large, deep-bodied Mexican 6-string acoustic bass guitar played in Mariachi bands, the león, plucked with a pick, and the bajo sexto, with six pairs of strings. This type of guitar is also known as Bajoloche, played with a style that includes slapping or plucking the strings. Arsenal Effectivo and Herencia de Patrones helped popularize bajoloche.

== History ==
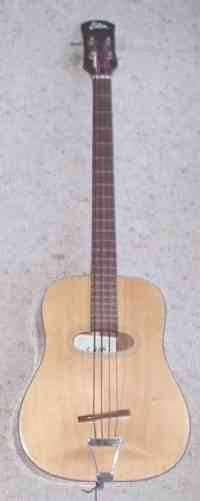
Eston acoustic bass guitar with no electric pickup, fretless but with fretlike markers, made in Italy in the 1980s

The Bassoguitar built by the Regal Musical Instrument Company was likely the first mass-produced acoustic bass to make use of a guitar-like body. Harptone started producing their B4 model in 1965 under the name Supreme; production ended in 1975. They also made a very limited number under the Standel logo. Ernie Ball began producing a model in the early 70's. Ball's aim was to provide bass guitarists with a more acoustic-sounding instrument that would match better with the sound of acoustic guitars. Ball stated that "...if there were electric bass guitars to go with electric guitars then you ought to have acoustic basses to go with acoustic guitars." Ball said that "...the closest thing to an acoustic bass was the Mexican guitarron...in mariachi bands, so I bought one down in Tijuana and tinkered with it."

Ball collaborated with George William Fullerton, a former employee at Fender, to develop the Earthwood acoustic bass guitar, which was introduced in 1972. Production of this instrument ceased in 1974, resuming a few years later under the direction of Ernie Ball's employee Dan Norton, until production finally ended again in 1985. The Earthwood acoustic bass guitar was quite large and deep in contrast to most instruments in current production, which gave it more volume, especially in the low register.^{photo 1} The Ernie Ball company describes Ball's design as "an idea before its time"; the instrument was little used in acoustic musical performances until the late 1980s, when the acoustic basses were used in performances on the MTV Unplugged television program. The Earthwood was quickly supplanted by the Washburn AB-40 designed by Mick Donner and Richard Siegle. The AB-40 and the more affordable AB-20 became the instrument of choice for bass players appearing on Unplugged.

Folk bass player Ashley Hutchings used the acoustic bass guitar with his Etchingham Steam Band in 1974 and 1975. An early user of the acoustic bass guitar in rock was English multi-instrumentalist and composer Mike Oldfield, who had one custom-built for him by luthier Tony Zemaitis in the mid-1970s and used the bass on a number of his recordings from that time onwards, a prominent example being his 1975 album Ommadawn.

== Construction and tuning ==
Like the traditional electric bass and the double bass, the acoustic bass guitar commonly has four strings, which are normally tuned E-A-D-G, an octave below the lowest four strings of the 6-string guitar. Like the electric bass guitar, models with five or more strings have been produced, although these are less common. In part, this is because the body of an acoustic bass guitar is too small to produce a resonance of acceptable volume at lower pitches on the low "B" string. One solution uses the five string acoustic bass to add an additional high string ("E-A-D-G-C") instead of adding a low "B". Another solution is to rely on amplification to reproduce the low "B" string's notes, or by making the body a little bit larger.

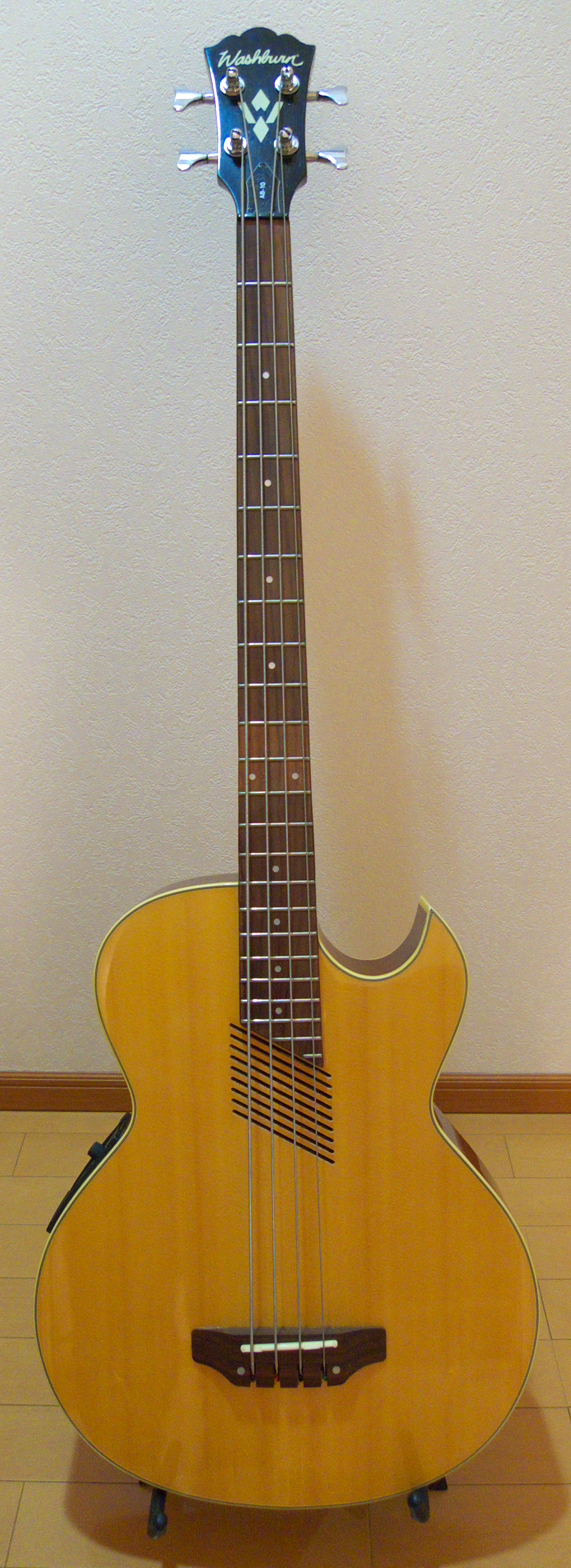
Washburn AB-10 acoustic-electric bass guitar

There are also semi-acoustic models, fitted with pickups, for use with an amplifier. The soundbox of these instruments is not large enough to amplify the sound. Instead, it produces a distinctive tone when amplified, similarly to semi-acoustic electric guitars. Thin-body semi-acoustic basses such as the violin-shaped Höfner made famous by the early Beatles and several Fender models are not normally regarded as acoustic basses at all, but rather as hollow-bodied bass guitars. There are also semi-acoustic basses such as Godin Guitars' "A-Series" that, once amplified, sound much closer between acoustic bass guitars and upright basses (double bass), and have been used in professional circles to "simulate" one when it would be impractical for transportation and other reasons to use a full-sized upright bass. As with semi-acoustic electric guitars, the line between acoustic instruments fitted with pickups and electric instruments with tone-enhancing bodies is sometimes hard to draw. Some instruments can also be equipped with a variety of pickups such as piezo pickups, the "standard" of acoustic-electric instruments as well as synth pickups that can replay "virtual" upright bass sounds and bring a semi-acoustic bass much closer to a double bass sonically.

Saga Musical Instruments produces a four-string bass resonator guitar under their Regal brand name.^{videos} National Reso-Phonic Guitars also produce three models of resonator bass guitar. One notable player of the resonator bass guitar is Les Claypool of Primus, who plays Regal RD-05 resonator basses.

== Manufacturers ==
Other manufacturers of acoustic bass guitars (not mentioned above) include Alvarez, Baton Rouge, Boulder Creek Guitars, Breedlove, Chesbro Music Company (Teton Guitars), Cort, Crafter, Jerzey, Dean, Eko, Epiphone, Eston, Fender, Furch, Gibson, Gold Tone, Guild, Ibanez, Larrivée, Lindo Guitars, Luna Guitars, Martin, Maton, Michael Kelly, Oscar Schmidt by Washburn, Ovation and its subsidiary Applause, Ozark, Prestige, Ribbecke Halfling Bass, Samick, Sigma Guitars, Sunlite, Sandberg, Spector, Stagg, Tagima, Tacoma, Takamine, Tanglewood, Taylor, Vintage Guitars, Washburn and Warwick.

== Mexican bass guitars ==
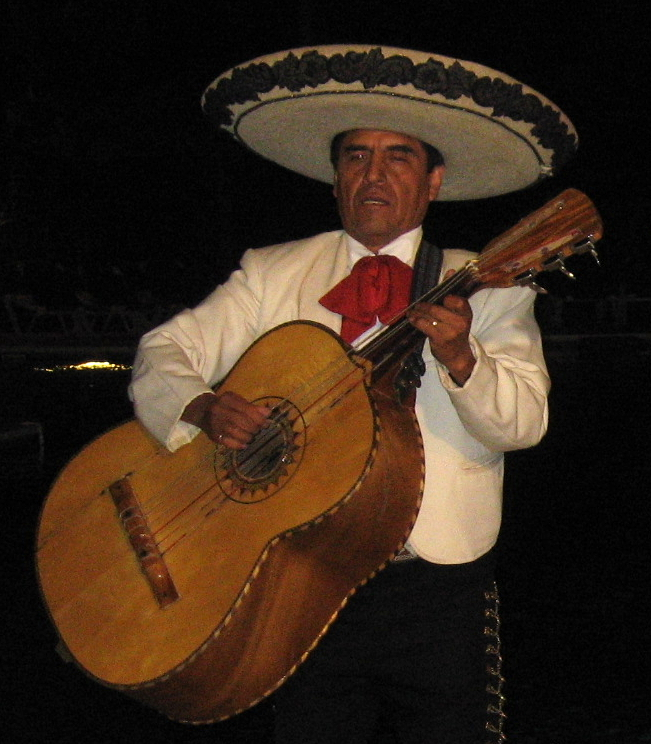
Mexican guitarrón acoustic bass guitar

Traditional music of Mexico features varieties of acoustic bass guitars. The guitarrón is a very large, deep-bodied Mexican 6-string acoustic bass guitar played in Mariachi bands. The bajo sexto, with six pairs of strings, resembles a twelve-string guitar tuned an octave lower. The heavy gauge strings generate a large string tension, yet the guitar is built relatively lightly. Musicians began to adopt the bajo sexto in Texas in the 1920s with the rise of "Tex-Mex" music, and it remains in common use for parts that would be played by the piano in traditional American popular music. The tuning of these instruments is (capital letters are an octave lower than small letters):

Baja sexto: Ee Aa Dd Gg Cc Ff

Other Latin American acoustic bass guitars exist as well, such as the Bordonua.

== Gallery ==
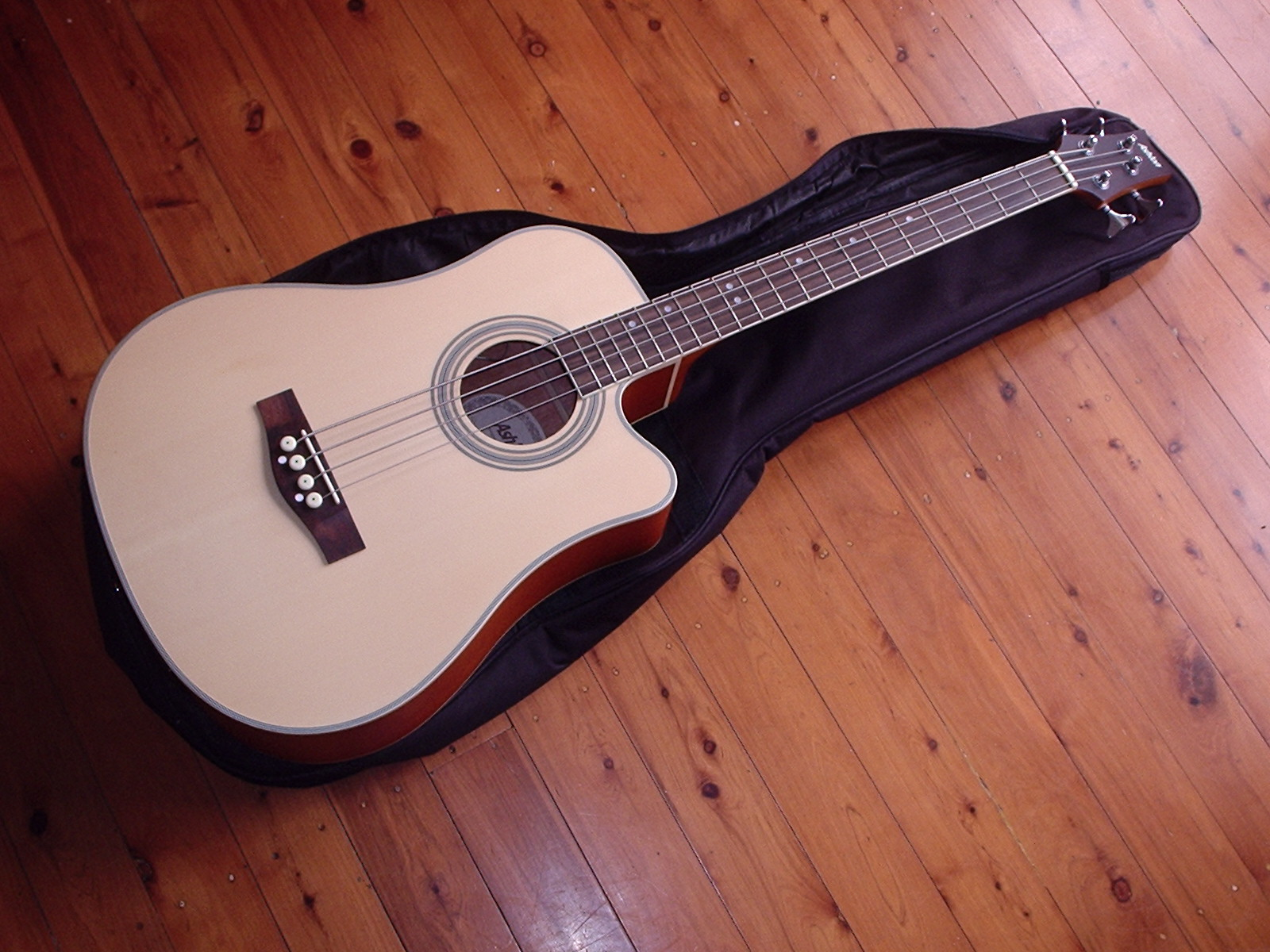
Ashton Acoustic Bass

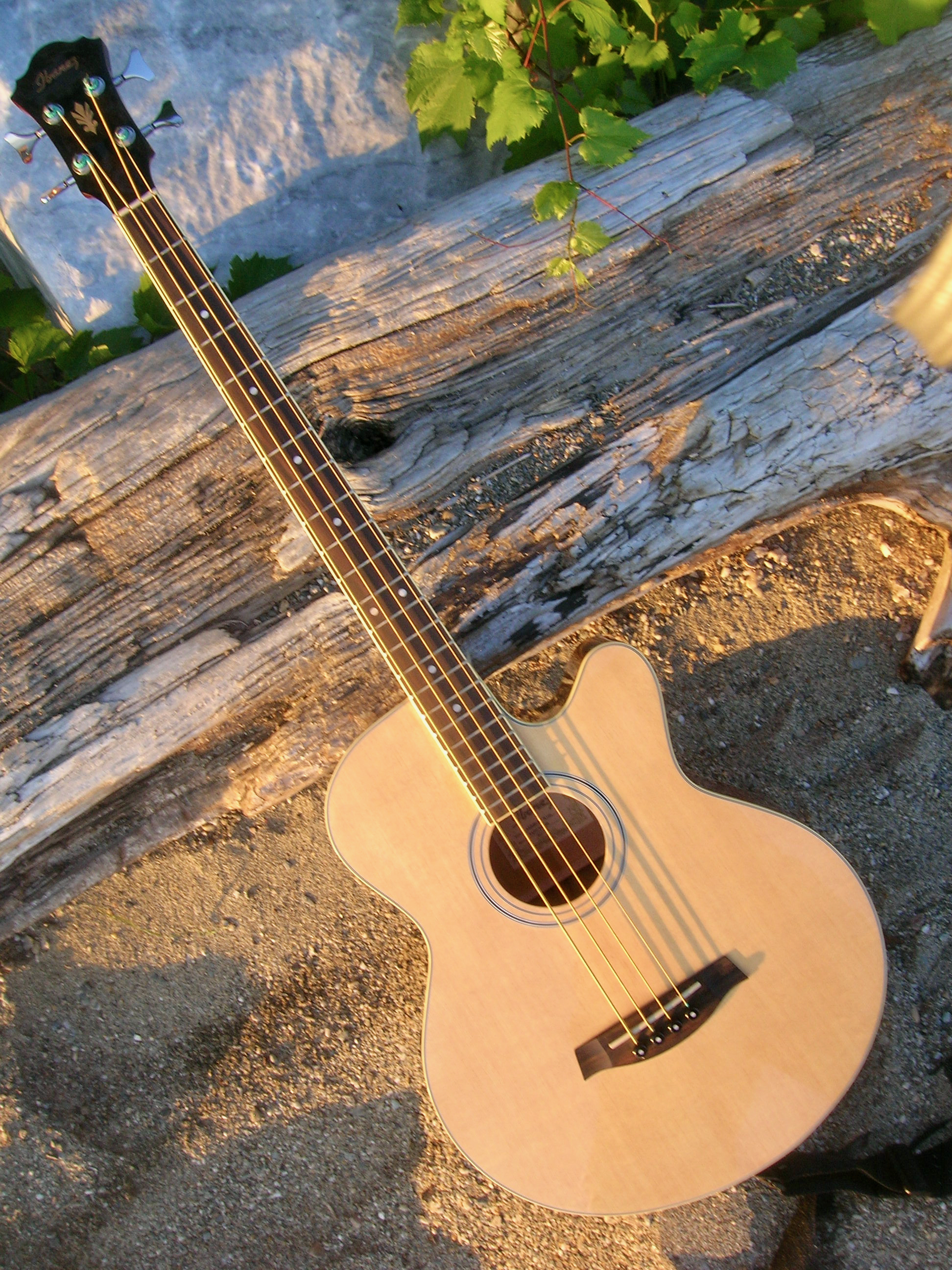
Ibanez Acoustic Bass

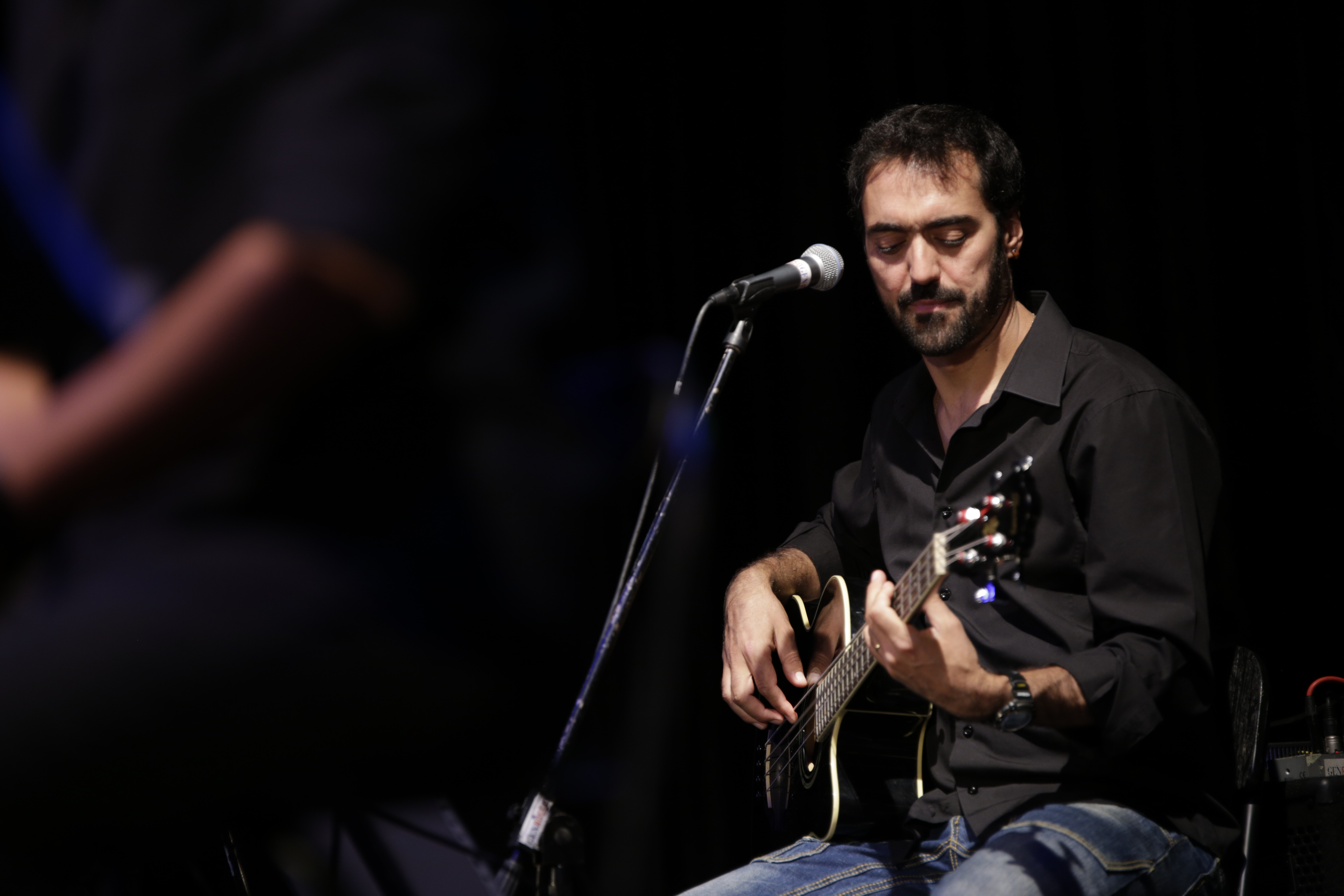
A man playing an acoustic bass.

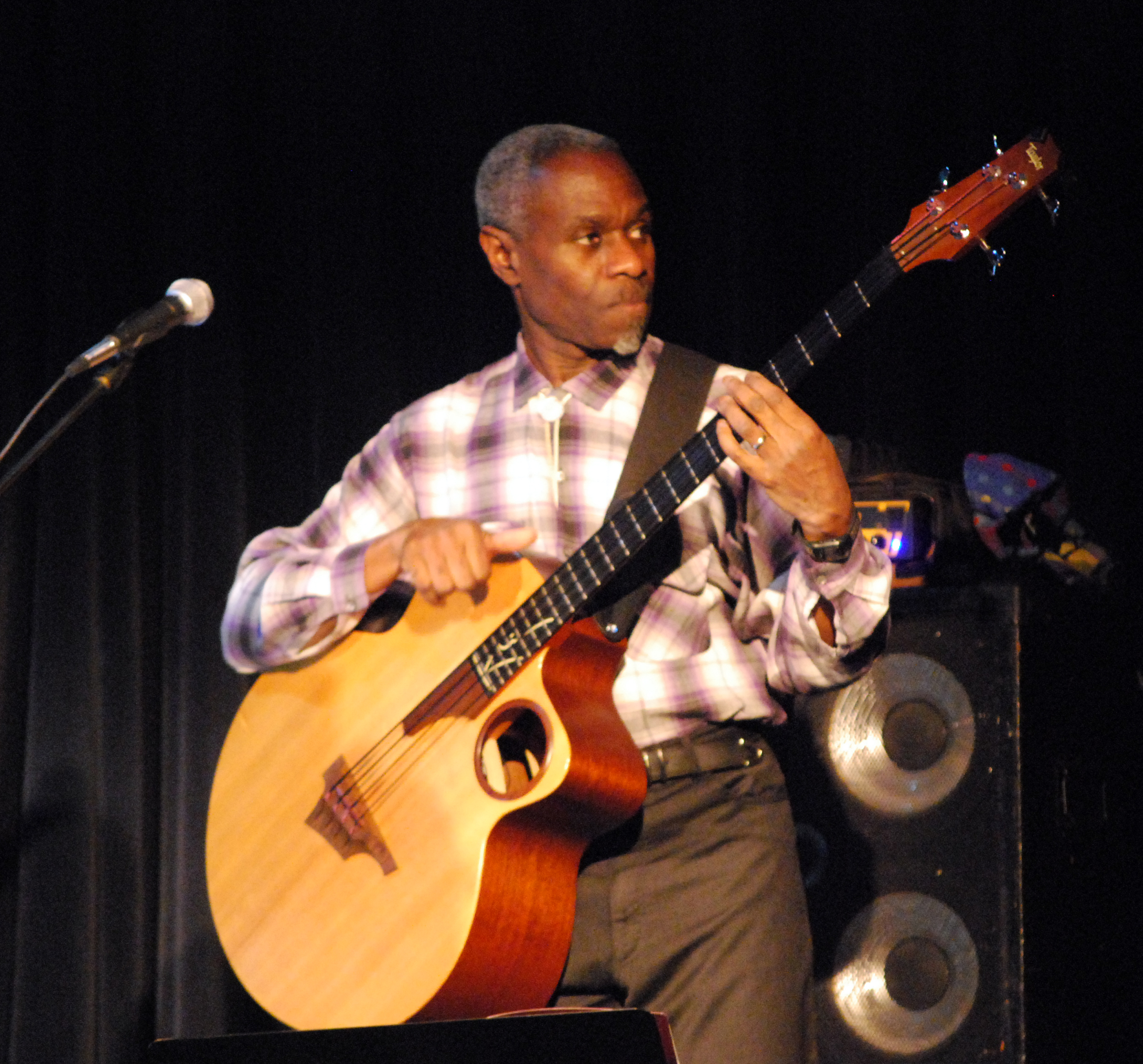
Taylor AB-1 Acoustic Bass

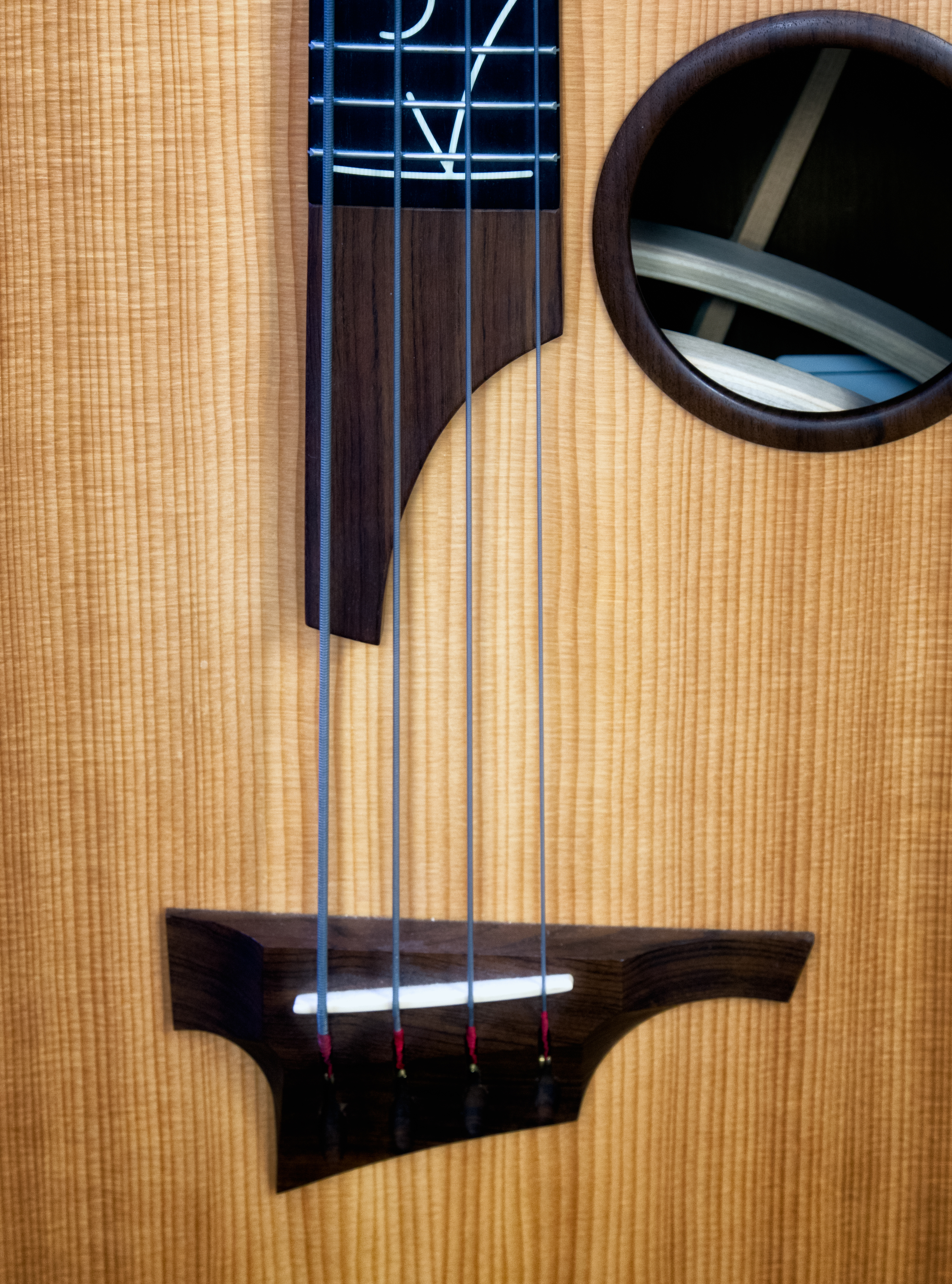
Closeup of the fingerboard of a Taylor AB-1 Acoustic Bass

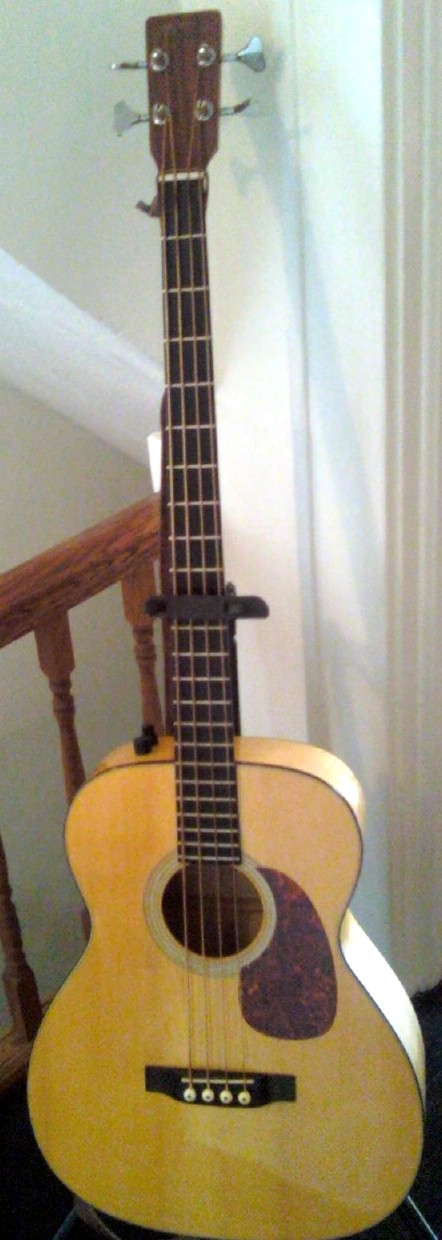
Martin B65E Acoustic Bass

== See also ==
- Bass guitar
- Contrabass guitar
- Double bass
- Mandobass
