= Teguima =

Teguima or Tehuima may refer to:

- Teguima people, an ethnic group of Mexico
- Teguima language, their language

== See also ==
- Tagima
