= Pedulla =

Pedulla or Pedullà is a surname. Notable people with the surname include:

- Gaetano Pedullà (born 1967), Italian journalist and politician
- Marisa Pedulla (born 1969), American judoka
- Sean Pedulla (born 2002), American basketballer
- Steve Pedulla, American musician

== See also ==
- M.V. Pedulla Guitars
