= Cavriago =

- Comune
- Comune di Cavriago
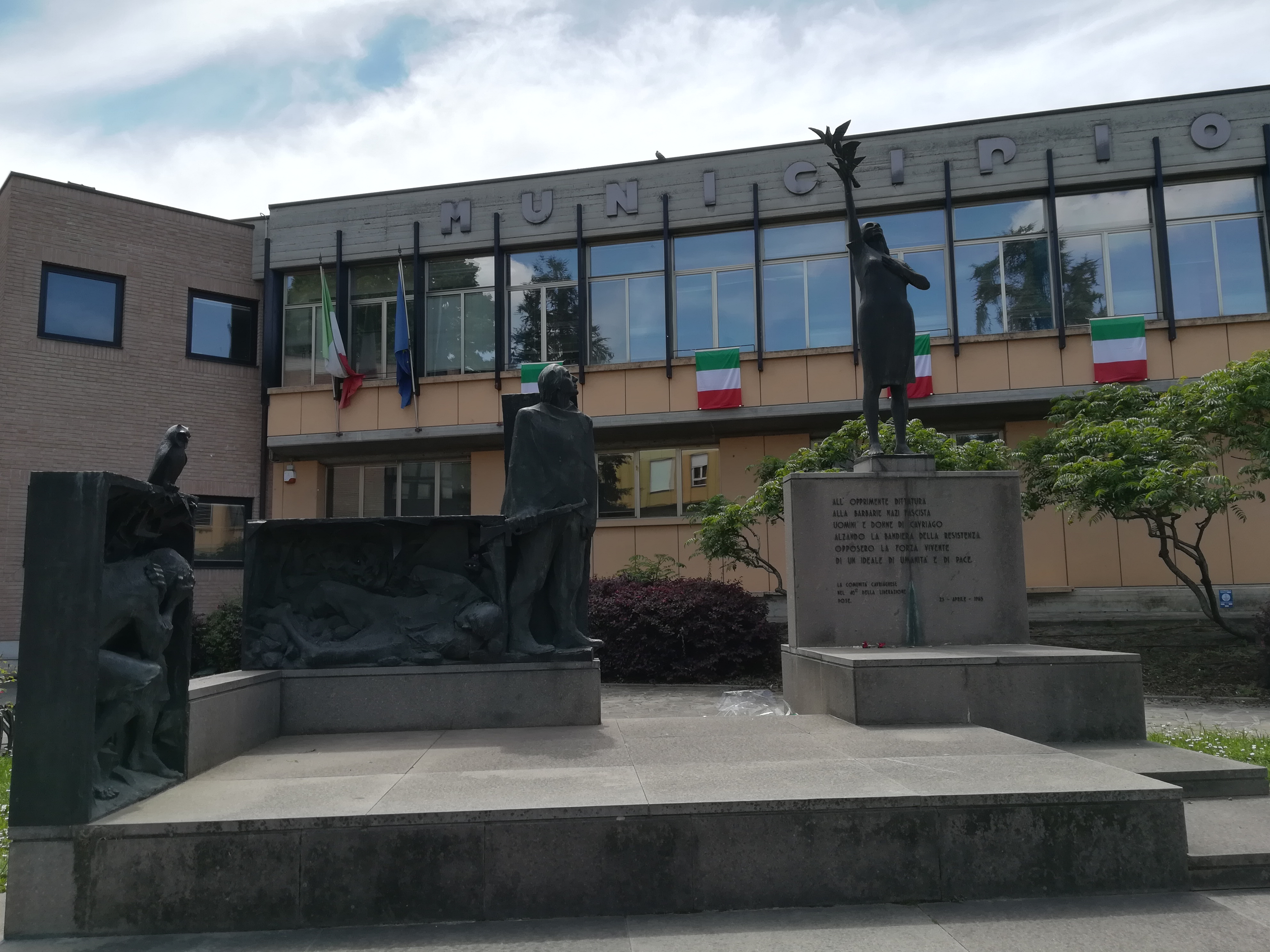
- Town hall of Cavriago

- Flag Coat of arms

- Location within Italy Location within Emilia-Romagna
- Coordinates: 44°42′N 10°32′E
- Country: Italy
- Region: Emilia-Romagna
- Province: Reggio Emilia (RE)
- Frazioni: Case Nuove, Corte Tegge, Quercioli

Government
  - Mayor: Francesca Bedogni

Area
  - Total: 17.0 km^{2} (6.6 sq mi)
- Elevation: 78 m (256 ft)

Population (31 December 2017)
  - Total: 9,917
  - Density: 583/km^{2} (1,510/sq mi)
- Demonym: Cavriaghesi
- Time zone: UTC+1 (CET)
  - Summer (DST): UTC+2 (CEST)
- Postal code: 42025
- Dialing code: 0522
- Website: Official website

Cavriago (Reggiano: Queriêgh; locally Quariêgh) is a comune (municipality) in the Province of Reggio Emilia in the Italian region Emilia-Romagna, located about 70 kilometres (43 miles) northwest of Bologna and about 8 km (5 mi) west of Reggio Emilia.

Cavriago borders the municipalities of Bibbiano and Reggio Emilia.

Cavriago is one of the very few places in Western Europe where a monument to Vladimir Lenin stands.

Location of Cavriago in the province of Reggio Emilia

== Twin towns ==
Cavriago is twinned with:

- Bender, Moldova, since 1971

== See also ==
- Wandre Guitars
