= Circus (Argent album) =

Studio album by Argent
- Released: March 1975
- Studio: CBS, Whitfield Street, London
- Genre: Progressive rock
- Length: 36:25
- Label: Epic
- Producer: Rod Argent, Chris White

Argent chronology
Encore (1974)	Circus (1975)	Counterpoints (1975)

Professional ratings
Review scores
Source	Rating
AllMusic	2/5 stars

Circus is the sixth studio album of Argent, released in March 1975 by Epic (PE 33422). It was the last album as part of their contract with CBS Records and the first after the departure of founding member/lead vocalist/guitarist Russ Ballard. New lead vocalist John Verity was added at the recommendation of Ballard (Verity's band had supported Argent during their previous tour and had impressed Ballard).

The album was recorded during an intense session after the new line up of the band workshopped and practised the material written largely by Rod Argent (bassist Jim Rodford wrote "Trapeze"). Prior to this album Argent had been working with his songwriting collaborator Chris White (the duo had written songs together and separately in The Zombies) on material for the band. The band quickly followed up with a second album Counterpoints the same year (1975) for RCA Records which has yet to be officially released on CD or in digital form.

The album is a concept album using the circus as a metaphor for life. The album charted at No. 171 in Billboard. Circus received a CD release as an individual title and a two-album on one CD release from Wounded Bird Records in 2005.

== Track listing ==
All songs composed by Rod Argent except where indicated.

Side one
No.	Title	Length
1.	"Circus"	3:45
2.	"Highwire"	9:05
3.	"Clown"	5:50

Side two
No.	Title	Writer(s)	Length
4.	"Trapeze"	Jim Rodford	8:48
5.	"Shine on Sunshine"		4:02
6.	"The Ring" (instrumental)		1:20
7.	"The Jester"		3:35

== Personnel ==
Argent

- Rod Argent – Fender Rhodes electric piano, acoustic piano, Mellotron, Moog synthesizer, Hammond organ, vocals
- John Verity – guitar, vocals
- John Grimaldi – guitar, cover art
- Jim Rodford – bass, vocals
- Robert Henrit – drums, percussion

Technical

- Mike Ross-Trevor – engineer
- Mark Williams – second engineer
- Martin Springett – inner sleeve illustration

== Charts ==
Chart (1975)	Peak position
US Billboard 200	171
