= John Verity =

English guitarist and singer

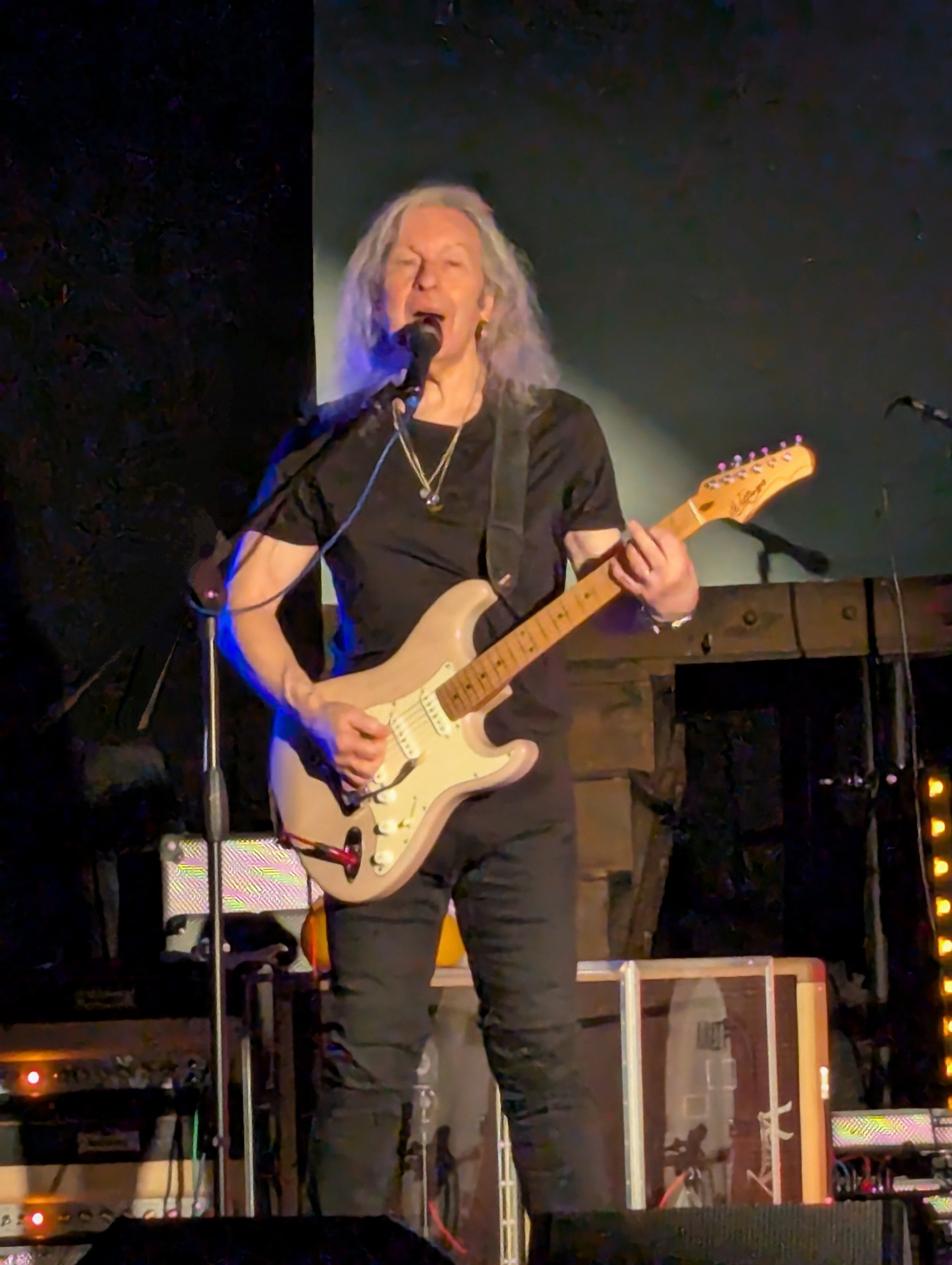

Background information
- Born: 3 July 1949 (age 77); Bradford, England
- Genres: rock Blues
- Instrument: guitar
- Formerly of: Argent
- Website: http://www.johnverity.com

John Verity (born 3 July 1949) is an English guitarist and singer. He is best known as a member of Argent, a band formed by Zombies keyboardist Rod Argent. He joined the band alongside John Grimaldi, replacing Russ Ballard.

== Early life, family and education ==
Verity was born in Bradford, West Yorkshire, England. He later pursued a career in music, becoming known for his work as a guitarist and recording artist.

== Career ==
Verity was a member of the band Argent from 1974 to 1976. When the band dissolved, he formed a new band, Phoenix, with Bob Henrit and Jim Rodford. The band recorded three albums with CBS Records and toured Europe before disbanding. Rodford joined the Kinks, Verity and Henrit joined Charlie, to record an album with RCA Records. Verity produced the Phoenix albums and Charlie album as well as the first Saxon album.

During the early 1980s Verity worked with Brian Connolly (former vocalist with Sweet) in an attempt to launch him as a solo artist. A single, "Hypnotised" was released on Carrere Records in 1982 produced by Verity, and written by Joe Lynn Turner. Verity was part of Connolly's backing band Encore when they supported Pat Benatar at the beginning of 1983. The line up of this band was formed from members of Verity's own band, which went on to release several albums including Interrupted Journey.

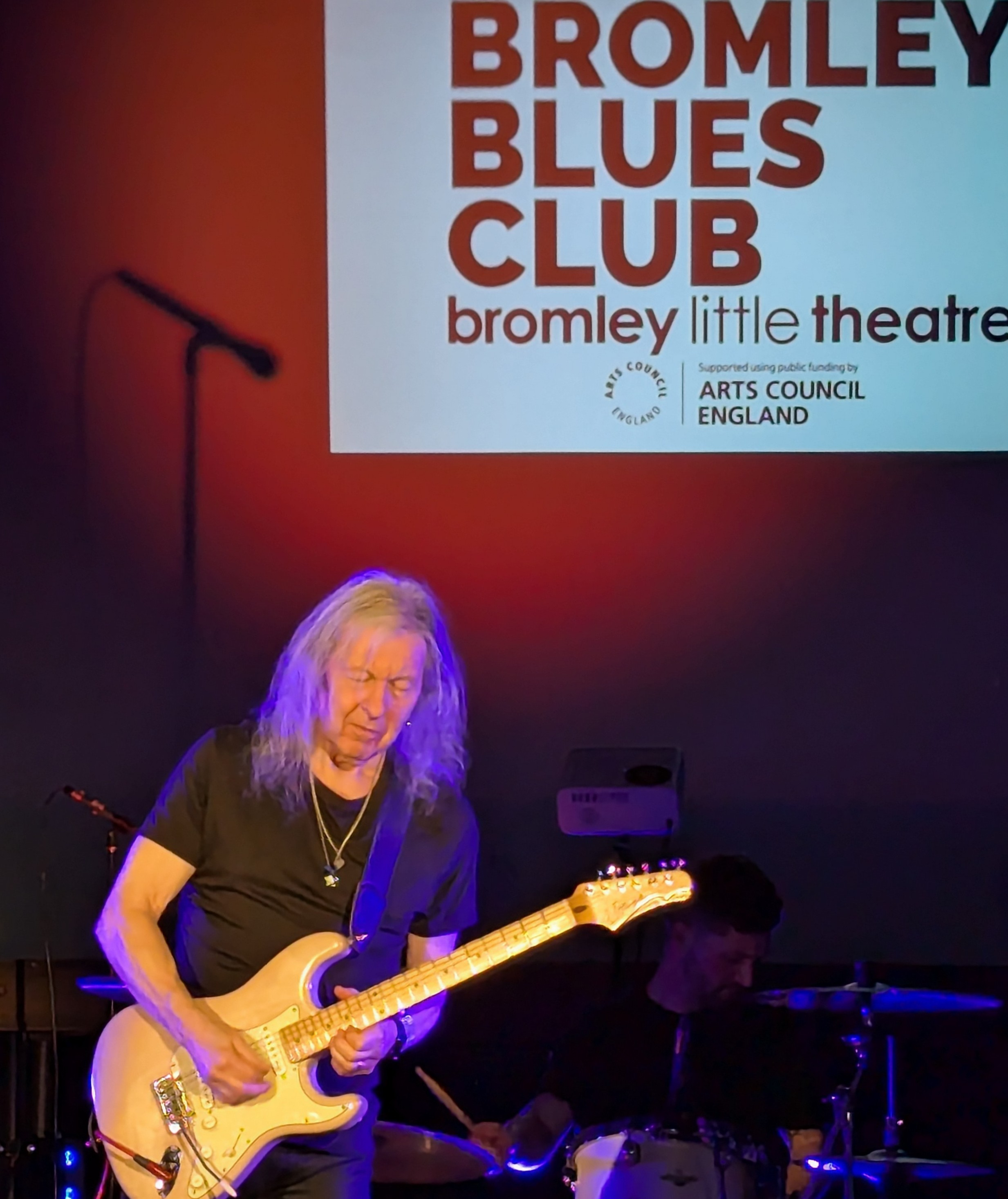
John Verity at the Bromley Little Theatre, December 2024

Verity continues to perform throughout the UK and overseas with the John Verity Band. He occasionally has solo outings where he will work with experienced musicians in the destination country. He additionally performs acoustic gigs as a duo with either Max Milligan or Mark Griffiths, as well as with the band. The usual line-up features Liam James Gray on drums with either Bob Skeat or Roger Iniss on bass.

In February 2020, John Verity released his 21st studio album, Passion.

== Signature Guitars ==
In 2013 Verity worked with Trev Wilkinson of UK guitar company Fret King to design the Stratocaster-inspired Corona JV. The relationship went further, and in 2019 the Vintage V6JV was released, which featured a hum-cancelling "Power Coil" pickup.

== Discography ==
=== Albums ===
- John Verity Band - John Verity Band (Dunhill Records) (1974)
- Argent - Circus (Epic Records) (1975)
- Argent - Counterpoints (RCA Records) (1975)
- Phoenix - "Phoenix" (CBS Records) (1976)
- Phoenix - In Full View (Charisma Records) (1979)
- Charlie - Good Morning America (RCA Records) (1981)
- John Verity - Interrupted Journey (PRT Records) (1983)
- John Verity - Truth of the Matter (PRT Records)(1985)
- John Verity - Rock Solid (1989)
- John Verity Band - Hold Your Head Up (1995)
- John Verity Band - Whole Lotta Love (1995)
- John Verity - From the Heart (2001)
- John Verity Band - Routes (Vavoom Records) (2004)
- John Verity and Max Milligan - Unplugged and Unhinged (Vavoom Records) (2005)
- John Verity Band - Live (Vavoom Records) (2006)
- John Verity Band - Say Why? (Vavoom Records) (2007)
- Phoenix - "Still Burning" (VaVoom Records) (2009)
- Verity - "Rise Like The Phoenix" (VaVoom Records) (2010)
- John Verity - "Unplugged and Unhinged Again" (Vavoom Records) (2010)
- John Verity - "Leo Had It Right" (VaVoom Records) (2011)
- John Verity - "Its a Mean Old Scene" (VaVoom Records) (2012)
- John Verity - "Tone Hound on the last train to Corona" (VaVoom Records) (2014)
- JohnVerity Band - "Live at Bosky" (VaVoom Records) (2015)
- John Verity Band - "Back Door Santa" - (VaVoom Records) - (2015)
- John Verity - "My Religion" - (VaVoom Records) - (2016)
- John Verity - "My Religion - Vinyl Double Album - (VaVoom Records) - (2016)
- John Verity - "Blue to my Soul" - (VaVoom Records) - (2017)
- John Verity - "Passion" - (VaVoom Records) - (2020)
- John Verity - "Blue" - (VaVoom Records) - (2022)

=== Singles ===
- Phoenix - "Easy" (1976)
- Phoenix - "Time Of The Season" (1977)
- Phoenix - "Juliet" (1980)
- Charlie - "Perfect Lover" (1981)
- Brian Connolly - "Hypnotized" (1982) produced and featuring Verity
- Verity - "Stay With Me" (1983)
- Verity - "Rescue Me" (1984)
- John Verity - "What About Me" (1984)
- John Verity - "Honesty and Emotion" (1985)
- Verity - "Two Hearts Burning" (1987)
- John Verity - "Want You" (1987)
