= Counterpoints (Argent album) =

Studio album by Argent
- Released: October 1975
- Genres: Progressive rock, jazz fusion
- Length: 38:12
- Label: RCA Victor
- Producers: Chris White, Rod Argent, Tony Visconti

Argent chronology
Circus (1975)	Counterpoints (1975)	The Argent Anthology - A Collection of Greatest Hits (1976)

Professional ratings
Review scores
Source	Rating
AllMusic	2/5 stars

Counterpoints is the seventh and final album by British rock band Argent, released in October 1975 on RCA Victor (United Artists Records in U.S. on 10 April 1976). It was the second studio album recorded without founding member Russ Ballard. John Verity stepped in to fill Ballard's shoes with the previous album Circus (at the recommendation of Ballard) after Verity's band supported Argent on tour 1974 tour. Phil Collins played drums and percussion on Counterpoints while Bob Henrit was ill.

The album received a CD release from the Korean label Big Pink in 2021.

== Track listing ==
All tracks composed by Rod Argent; except where indicated

Side one
No.	Title	Writer(s)	Length
1.	"On My Feet Again"		3:08
2.	"I Can't Remember, But Yes" (instrumental)		3:11
3.	"Time"	Jim Rodford	7:20
4.	"Waiting for the Yellow One"	John Grimaldi	2:48
5.	"It's Fallen Off" (instrumental)	Grimaldi	2:44

Side two
No.	Title	Length
6.	"Be Strong"	4:14
7.	"Rock 'n' Roll Show"	4:04
8.	"Butterfly"	3:02
9.	"Road Back Home"	7:41

== Personnel ==
Argent

- Rod Argent – organ, electric piano, vocals
- John Grimaldi – guitar, lap steel guitar, cover artwork
- John Verity – guitar, vocals
- Jim Rodford – bass guitar, guitar, vocals
- Bob Henrit – drums, percussion

with:

- Phil Collins – drums, percussion
