= John Grimaldi =

- Born: 25 May 1955; St Albans, Hertfordshire, England
- Died: 15 November 1983 (aged 28)
- Genres: Rock, jazz, experimental jazz, progressive rock
- Occupations: Musician, songwriter
- Instruments: Strings, Keyboards, vocals
- Years active: 1972–1983
- Labels: CBS, Rough Notes
- Website: John Grimaldi's Music

John Grimaldi (25 May 1955 – 12 December 1983) was a British musician, songwriter, and visual artist. He was born in St Albans, Hertfordshire, England. Grimaldi was educated at St Albans School, where he developed his songwriting, electric jazz, and visual art. His career was focused on jazz, although he played in other genres. Grimaldi formed several bands and wrote and performed until his death from multiple sclerosis in 1983.

== Musical career ==
=== Motiffe ===
(1972)
Grimaldi became interested in music after he joined his school's orchestra in his early teenage years. While in the school orchestra, he learned to play stringed instruments and write music. Grimaldi and Mark Pasterfield set up a school band called Motiffe in 1970. Grimaldi played guitar; Pasterfield became the drummer; Dave Shackley played bass; and Ian Wilson, Quentin Bryar, and Steve Bellingham played keyboard. Bellingham left in 1971, and Mick Avery then joined on keyboard. In early 1972, they had a support slot to the Electric Light Orchestra; shortly after, they were recorded live in St Albans School by Deroy; 100 copies of the album were produced.

=== Flux ===
(1972 – 1974)
In 1972, there was conflict within Motiffe regarding what and how much the band should play. John Grimaldi and Dave Shackley started a new band named Flux, aiming to become professional. Neil Chapman (drums) and Phil Hawkins (keyboard) made up the rest of the band. Flux played live and recorded music but nothing was ever released. In late 1972, Chapman left, to be replaced by Charlie Chandler from Hemel Hempstead on drums; Dave Punshon (keyboard) left St Albans band Babe Ruth to join Flux. Richard Blanchard, a flautist, saxophonist, and vocalist from Pinner, joined. The band played in 100 clubs, including the Marquee Club.

Flux recorded a demo for EMI at Manchester Square, but were not signed. Punshon left to live with the Divine Light Movement and was replaced by circuit musician Zoë Kronberger (keyboard). Chandler left to rebuild antique furniture and was replaced by circuit musician Nick Monas (drums). Blanchard, who was also a professional photographer, left to focus on his photography work and to pursue other music opportunities. He was replaced by circuit pro Jon Gifford (flute/saxophone).

Kronberger and Monas eventually left in mid-1974. Soon afterward, Grimaldi joined Argent, resulting in Flux folding in late 1974.

A vinyl LP of a Flux live gig at St Albans City Hall in 1973 was released on Seelie Court Records (cat. no. SCLP005) in 2020. The line-up was Grimaldi (guitar), Dave Punshon (keyboards), Richard Blanshard (saxophone, flute, and vocals), Dave Shackley (bass), and Charlie Chandler (drums).

=== Argent ===
(1974 – 1975)
In 1974, Russ Ballard left Argent; Grimaldi and John Verity joined the band to replace him. Their entry into the band was partly due to their being from the same town and school as Rod Argent, the band's founder. Grimaldi was involved in their albums Circus and Counterpoints, contributing to the album artwork as well as the music. He also played with at the Roundhouse in 1975.
When the band stopped touring in 1975, John left to organize the John Grimaldi Band.

=== Captain Sussex ===
(1975 – 1976)
The John Grimaldi Band turned into Captain Sussex, a jazz rock band. Grimaldi played withlaying with John Giblin (bass, vocals), Mick Parker (keyboard), and Preston Heyman (drums).

=== Cheap Flights ===
Coming out of Captain Sussex came Cheap Flights. This band went through three major versions but was firmly planted in the jazz rock genre.

(1976 – 1977)

This first version of Cheap Flights was pure jazz rock. Grimaldi collaborated with Peter Arneson (of the Rubettes) on keyboard, Dan K. Brown (of The Fixx) on bass, Cliff Venner on percussion, and Pete Ernest on second guitar and vocals

This lineup of Cheap Flights produced their signature track "Cheap Day Return". They had a number of gigs in the London and Hertfordshire areas and had a studio tape produced by Tony Visconti.
(1977–1978)

Peter Arneson left in 1977 to pursue other projects, as did Pete Ernest. Grimaldi invited former Motiffe member Mark Pasterfield to join the band. The band's music moved slightly away from jazz and more into rock.

The band gigged in the London and Hertfordshire areas, as well as moving into the West Country. Dan Brown and Cliff Venner moved on, leaving a gap which was filled by various musicians, until Carmello Luigeri, Brett Salmon, and Dave Taylor joined. This lineup had an eight night tour of the Netherlands in October and November 1978. The 28 October gig at the Gigant in Apeldoorn was recorded by the Hilversum 3 radio station, but this recording is missing.

(1978–1980)
In 1978, Pasterfield had to leave for medical reasons, leaving the band with Grimaldi on lead guitar and vocals, Salmon on second guitar and backing vocals, Taylor on percussion, and Luggeri on bass. This lineup lasted two years, playing around the country on the pub, club, and college circuits. They produced a single, financed by a fan, which sold 5000 copies, but did not get an album deal.

=== Adrian Stamford ===
(1977–1979)
Grimaldi created Adrian Stamford, an alter ego, under which he wrote experimental sounds that would not fit in with his other projects. A number of these came out in the Cheap Flights sound, such as his use of the H&H echo machine to replay his guitar solos live on stage, as can be heard in "Snakes in the Ice" and "The Cause".

=== Casual Athletes ===
(1980–1982)
Casual Athletes was the last project Grimaldi was involved in. Although they did not perform live, Grimaldi wrote a number of songs specifically for them, and a demo tape was produced in a recording studio in Hertfordshire, funded by Pete Waterman. Grimaldi experimented with a drum machine during these sessions, as a suitable drummer was not available.

The studio recordings had a lineup of: Grimaldi on keyboard, Brett Salmon on guitar, Dan Brown on bass, and Linn Electronics on drum machine.

== Discography ==
=== Studio albums ===
Motiffe

Year	Album	Label
1972	Motiffe	Deroy
2021	Motiffe (remaster)	Seelie Court

Flux

Year	Album	Label
2021	Flux	Seelie Court

Argent

Year	Album	Label
1975	Circus	Epic
1975	Counterpoints	RCA

=== Singles ===
Cheap Flights

Year	Title	Label
1978	"I'm Sorry/Scared"	Rough Notes
