= Roman Boianciuc =

Romanian luthier

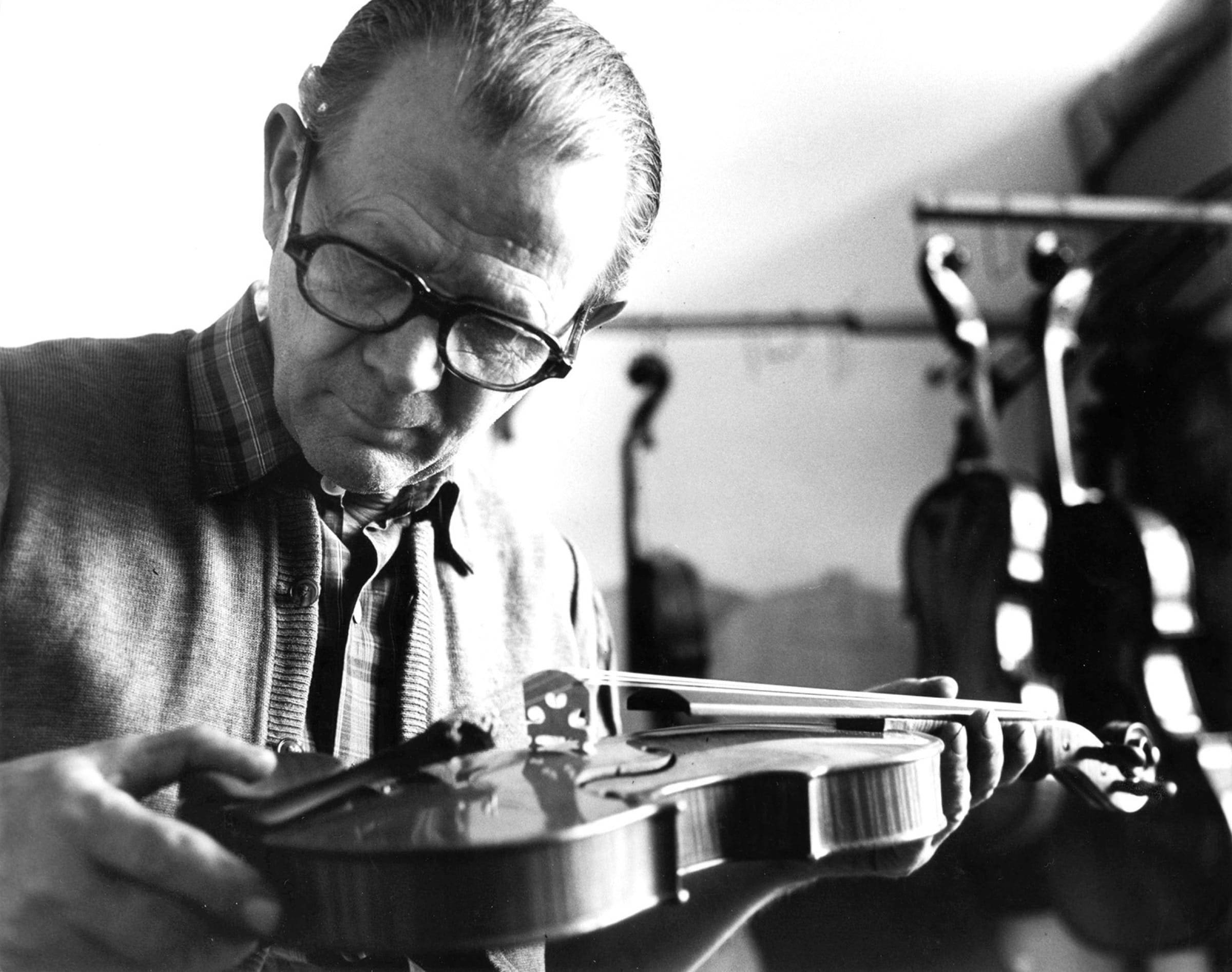

Roman Boianciuc (sometimes Boiangiuc) (7 November 1912, Vășcăuți, Russian Empire – 11 September 1998, Reghin, Romania) was one of the most important Romanian luthiers. In 1951 he founded the state-owned Hora (company) in the city of Reghin serving as its director until 1979. He was a disciple of Alexandru Apăteanu (b. 1886, Dorohoi), who in turn learned the violin from Anton Uhlschmidt of Schönbach (Zdislava, Czech Republic). The font used by them was that of the Stradivarius violins, with yellow or red oil varnish. His violins were praised by David Oistrakh for their sound, and he received medals for his works in Poznan, Liège, Cremona, and Sofia. Some of his instruments were auctioned on Tarisio Auctions. In 2010 he was declared post-mortem a citizen of honor of Reghin, and a festival bearing his name was held in 2019
