= Stagg Music =

Belgian musical instrument company

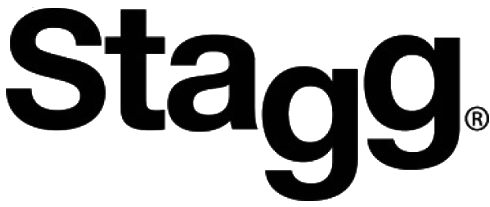
- Type: Subsidiary
- Industry: Musical instruments
- Founded: 1995; 31 years ago
- Headquarters: Brussels, Belgium
- Products: Guitars, Percussion, Harmonicas, Wind instruments
- Website: staggmusic.com

Stagg music is a Belgian musical instrument company headquartered in Brussels, currently a subsidiary of EMD Music. The company produce a wide range of musical instruments, which includes string instruments (electric, acoustic and classical guitars, bass guitars, banjos, mandolins, ukuleles, double basses, violins, violas, cellos, bows), percussion instruments (drum kits and pads, cymbals, drum sticks), tuned metal (xylophone, metallophones), free reed (harmonicas, melodicas) and brass instruments (flugelhornes, euphoniums, saxophones) as well as effects units and other accessories.

== Stagg S300RDS ==
Stagg S300RDS is an electric guitar made by Stagg Music. Its primary colour is black but it also comes in a red burst colour, and has a white pick guard. This guitar is from the Standard/S300 series. The guitar is a Standard "S"E-Gitarre electric guitar; it has 3 single-coil pickups. The guitar also has 2 tone controls and 1 volume control. It has a 5-way switch Pickup Selector Switch. The guitar's body is made from alder. The neck is made up of hard maple, bolt-on, 648 mm, (25.5 in.). The fingerboard is made from rosewood and consists of 21 frets. The Bridge is a Classic "S" Style Tremolo. The machine heads are vintage-style nickel. The finish is high gloss.
