= Michael Tobias Design =

Manufacturer of electric bass guitars

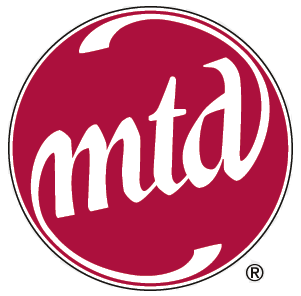
- Type: Private
- Industry: Musical instruments
- Founded: 1994; 32 years ago
- Founder: Michael Tobias
- Headquarters: Kingston, New York, United States
- Area served: Worldwide
- Products: Bass guitars
- Website: mtdbass.com

Michael Tobias Design (MTD) is a Kingston, New York–based manufacturer of electric bass guitars founded by luthier Michael Tobias in 1994.

Tobias, along with two part-time helpers, currently builds about 10 electric basses per month at his shop in Woodstock, New York. MTD's Kingston, Heir, and Saratoga basses are manufactured in China to Tobias's specifications. Tobias also designs and develops electric and acoustic basses in collaboration with musical instrument makers that have included Lakland, Modulus, Alvarez, Brian Moore, and American Showster.

== History ==
MTD is a successor to Tobias Guitars, established in Orlando, Florida, in April 1977 and sold to Gibson Guitar Corporation in 1990. Following the sale, Tobias moved to Kingston, New York, where he began building basses under the Eclipse name before settling on "MTD" (Michael Tobias Design) for the company name and trademark.

== Instruments ==
MTD handmade American basses come in 35 inch-scale 4-, 5-, 6-, and 7-string models and are available in a variety of configurations. Necks are made from maple or ash with a rosewood fingerboard. Wood bodies are made from medium weight ash, domestic tulip wood (a.k.a. Eastern yellow poplar), alder, and mahogany. MTD bodies and necks are ergonomically carved to allow access to the instrument's extended scale and feature an asymmetrical neck, a design where the neck is thinner on the lower side than the upper. Pickups and active electronics are a proprietary design for MTD made by Bill Bartolini. All currently manufactured MTD basses, including Kingston basses, employ the Buzz Feiten Tuning System.

Lower-priced Chinese-made MTD Kingston bases include the Precision Bass-inspired CRB (or "classic rock bass") and the Kingston Saratoga bass, billed as "a modern re-imagining" of the classic Jazz-style bass. Features of the MTD Kingston basses include an ergonomic body shape and asymmetrical neck.

== See also ==
- Tobias (bass guitar company)
