= Tonante =

Brazilian guitar company

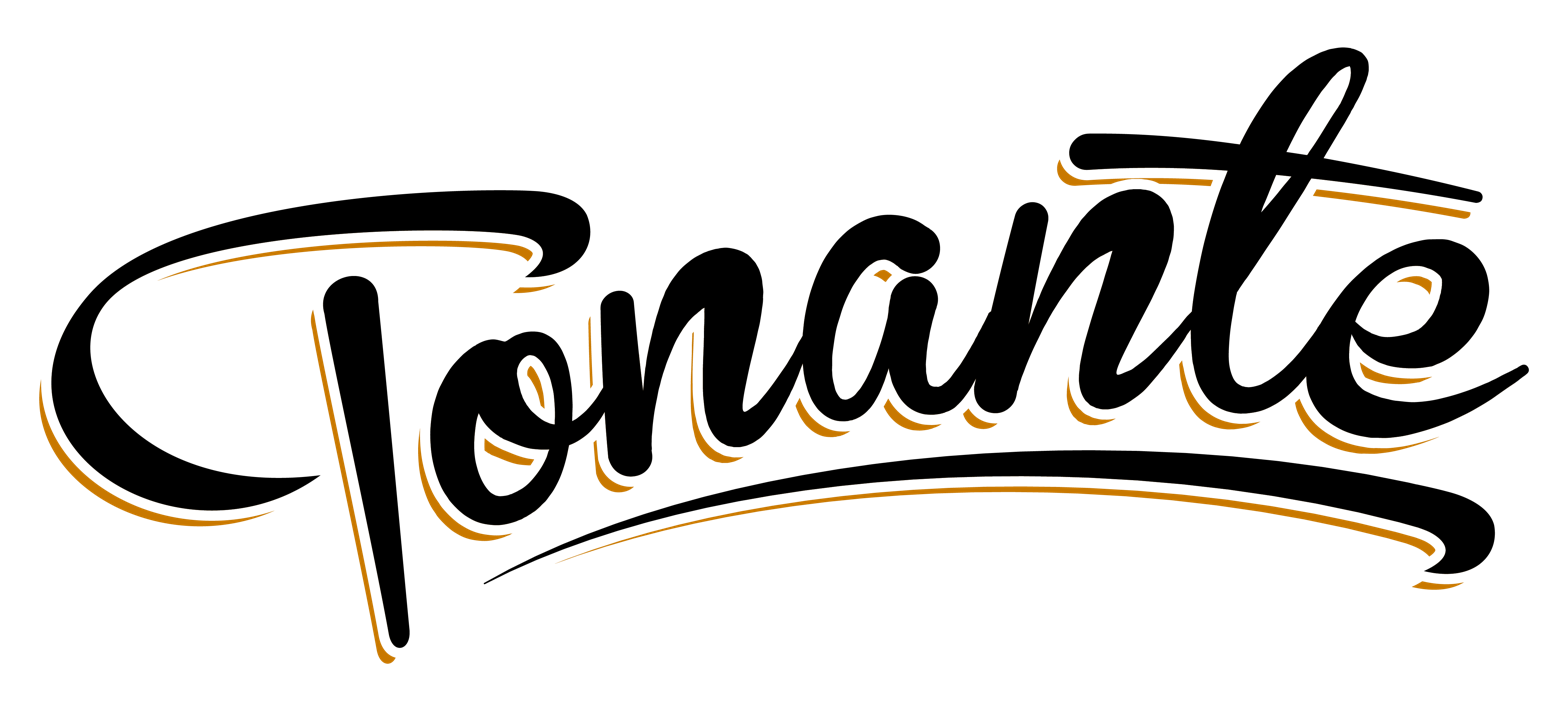
- Type: Private
- Industry: Musical instruments
- Founded: 1954; 72 years ago
- Founder: Abel and Samuel Tonante
- Headquarters: Brazil
- Products: Electric and acoustic guitars, banjos, cavaquinhos
- Parent: Grupo Oderço
- Website: https://tonantebrasil.com.br/

Tonante, initially called Ao Rei dos Violões Limitada (To the King of Acoustic Guitars in English), is a Brazilian guitar manufacturing company founded in 1954 by the Portuguese brothers Abel and Samuel Tonante, who artisanelly built musical instruments, thirteen years after their arrival in the country.

Tonante is well known for making highly affordable stringed instruments in Brazil, together with companies such as Giannini, Del Vecchio and Di Giorgio. Tonante's range of products include electric and acoustic guitars, banjos and cavaquinhos.

== History ==
During the military dictatorship in Brazil, import substitution policies forbade or restricted imports, which led local manufacturers (like Tonante guitars) to achieve a dominant market position. Tonante guitars were notable for being cheaper than other local competitors such as Giannini, Snake or Finch electric guitars which made it one of the most popular stringed instruments manufacturer in Brazil.

== Models ==
Guitar models manufactured by Tonante includes:

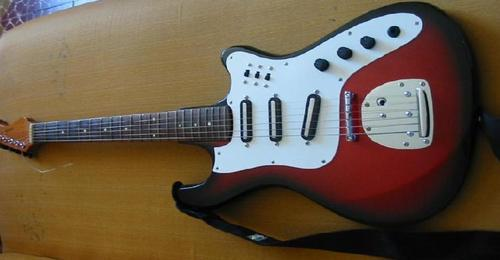
Tonante Finder, inspired on Fender models

- Finder: a cheap mix between a Fender Stratocaster and a Fender Jazzmaster;
- Erton: a Fender Stratocaster copy;
- Starlight: a heavy metal guitars with a vibrola system derived from the Floyd Rose and three single coil pickups, with a body similar to the Finder;
- Les Paul: a flat top Gibson Les Paul copy;
- Various cavaquinhos, mandolins and acoustic guitars.

== Cult status ==
Although early Tonante instruments were plagued by low quality electronics, rough, uncomfortable shapes and bad finish, they have attained cult status due to their historical significance. A vintage Tonante guitar can be worth as much as R$170 (approximately $32).
