= Fret-King =

British musical instrument manufacturer

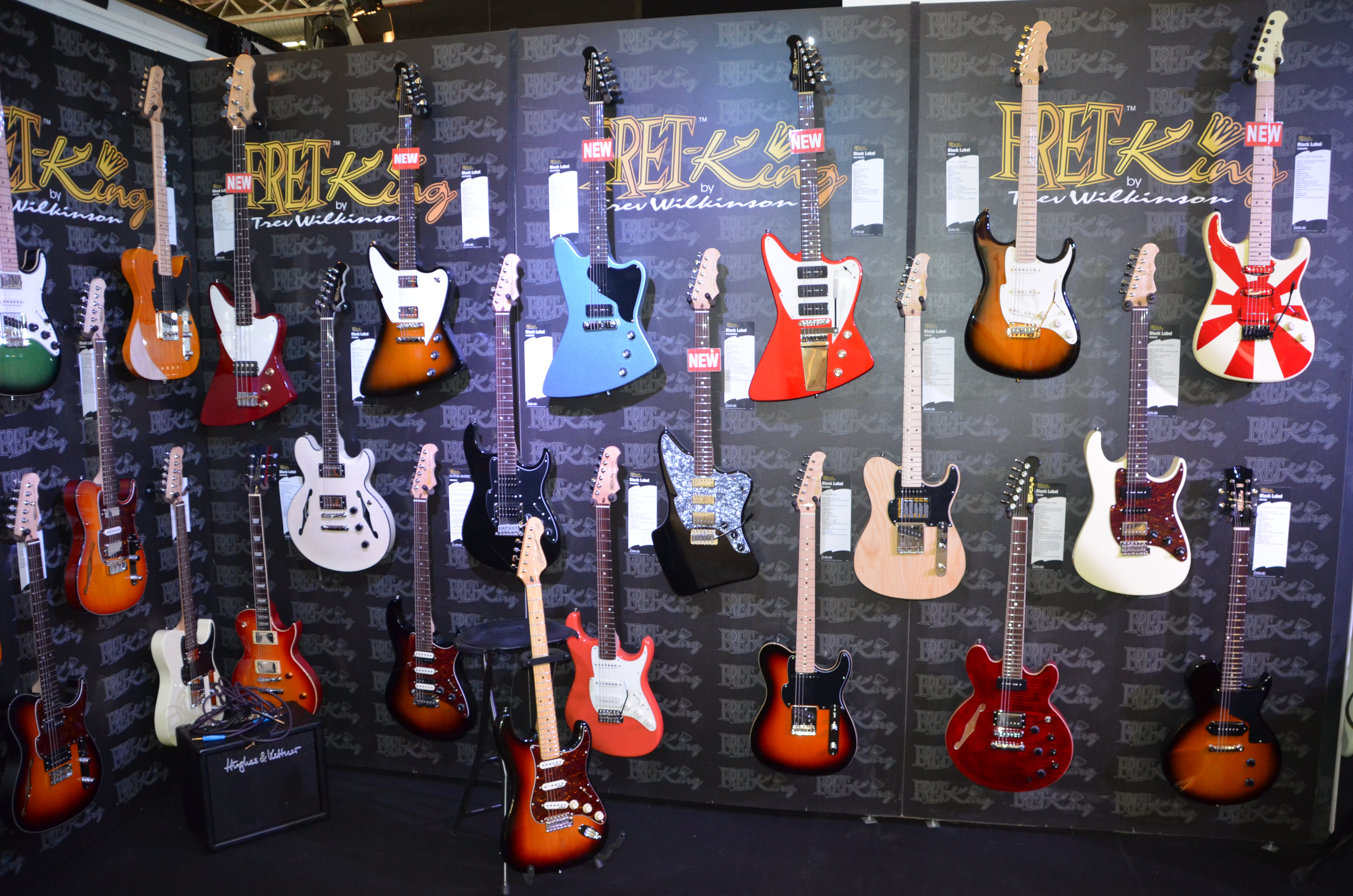
Fret-King by Trev Wilkinson at Musikmesse Frankfurt 2013.

Fret-King is a UK-based manufacturer of stringed instruments and musical accessories. The company was founded by guitar designer Trevor Wilkinson in the early 1990s. Fret-King manufactures electric and bass guitars, primarily inspired by traditional designs from the 1950s, such as the Les Paul, Stratocaster, and Telecaster. These instruments often feature non-standard pickup configurations and Gibson-style hollow bodies, alongside some models with unique shapes.

Since 2008, the Fret-King brand is owned by UK musical instrument distributor John Hornby Skewes & Co. Ltd (JHS), which is headquartered in Garforth, Leeds.

Fret-King has designed signature model guitars for a number of artists, including Jerry Donahue, John Etheridge, Gordon Giltrap, John Verity, John Jorgenson, Elliott Randall, and Danny Bryant.

Notable guitarists who have supported Fret-King guitars include Manic Street Preachers guitarist James Dean Bradfield, Parker Lundgren, Gavin Coulson of Oliver/Dawson Saxon, Jeff Brown of Cats In Space, and Andrew Pipe of The Mentulls.

Trevor Wilkinson parted ways with JHS in 2018.

== See also ==
- Vintage Guitars
