= Tobias (bass guitar company) =

- Company type: Private (1977–90); Brand (1990–present)
- Industry: Musical instruments
- Founded: 1977; 49 years ago
- Founder: Michael Tobias
- Fate: Company acquired by Gibson in 1990, becoming a brand
- Headquarters: Orlando, Florida, United States
- Area served: Worldwide
- Products: Bass guitars
- Parent: Epiphone

Tobias is a brand of bass guitars originally made by luthier Michael Tobias starting in the 1970s, and later bought out by Gibson. Nowadays, Tobias bass guitars are sold under the Epiphone division.

== History ==
Tobias Guitars was established in Orlando, Florida in April 1977. The vast majority of Tobias instruments are of neck-through construction, a style of neck-body assembly where the neck of the instrument is a single piece of wood that extends through the body and had the sides of the bass glued to it rather than being bolted on. However, once purchased by Gibson in 1990, a few bolt-on models were produced such as the Killer-B (with the "B" in the name standing for "bolt-on") as well as the Growler Basses.

Tobias basses also were among the first to feature an asymmetrical neck, a design where the neck is thinner on the lower side than the upper. The first serial number was 0178, instead of the usual 0001, as a reference to the month the first bass was completed, January 1978.

In 1990, Gibson Guitar Corporation purchased Tobias and moved production to Nashville. The first Tobias bass under Gibson ownership bore the serial number 1094. Michael Tobias left the company in 1992 to found Michael Tobias Design which produces a line of hand-made basses similar in spirit to the older Tobias basses. Basses below the serial number 2044 were built in the California factory headed-up by Michael Tobias; serial numbers after that were produced by Gibson with a transition period in which Tobias worked with Gibson and continued to produce basses.

== Products ==
- Toby Standard
- Toby Deluxe IV
- Toby Deluxe V
- Toby Pro 4
- Toby Pro 5
- Toby Pro 6
- Renegade 4/5
- Growler 4/5
- Killer B 4/5/6
- Basic 4/5/6
- Classic 4/5/6
- Signature 4/5/6

== See also ==
- Michael Tobias Design
