= Jens Ritter Instruments =

Manufacturer of high-end electric string instruments

Jens Ritter Instruments is a manufacturer of high-end electric string instruments. It was founded by Jens Ritter in the mid-1990s and was known as Ritter Bass Guitars until 2010 when Jens expanded his line to include guitars. Jens produces 50 to 60 handmade instruments each year in his shop located in the small wine town of Deidesheim, Germany.

A number of well-known bassists play Ritter Basses including Phil Lesh, Josh Duhamel, and Doug Wimbish. Jens Ritter instruments are best known for their progressive design and construction, artistic appearance and limited availability. They also produce strings and other accessories.

== History ==
Jens Ritter was born on July 11, 1972. When he was seven years old, Ritter constructed a primitive bass guitar out of an old food can, some wire, and a small piece of wood. At the age of sixteen, unsatisfied with the basses he'd been exposed to as a player, he decided to modify a bass to his liking and at age nineteen built a bass of his own design. After completing school at an academy of technical arts, he started his own company. More recently, Jens spent time studying Stradivarius violin-making and has also studied engineering and oscillation principles which he employs in his designs. Jens' atelier was built in the 17th century and was once served as a winery. It is located in Deidesheim, Rhineland-Palatinate, just minutes from the Rhine river and not far from where he was born.

== Ritter Royals ==
Ritter Royals are one-off instruments made with rare materials and frequently feature uncommon construction designs. For example, the body of The Flora Aurum is carved from a rare, solid piece of quilted maple. Its bridge, tuners, and knobs are hand-cast solid gold. Two diamonds, totaling 3.3 carats, adorn the volume and tone knobs. Gold leaf covers the back of the neck and headstock. It has tiny green-diamond knob position markers and an ebony fingerboard with a Renaissance-inspired solid-gold flower inlay—each leaf decorated with a platinum-set black diamond. The nut was carved from 10,000-year-old Siberian mammoth-tusk ivory. The value of this instrument is estimated at $100,000.00.

== The Princess Isabella Baritone Guitar ==
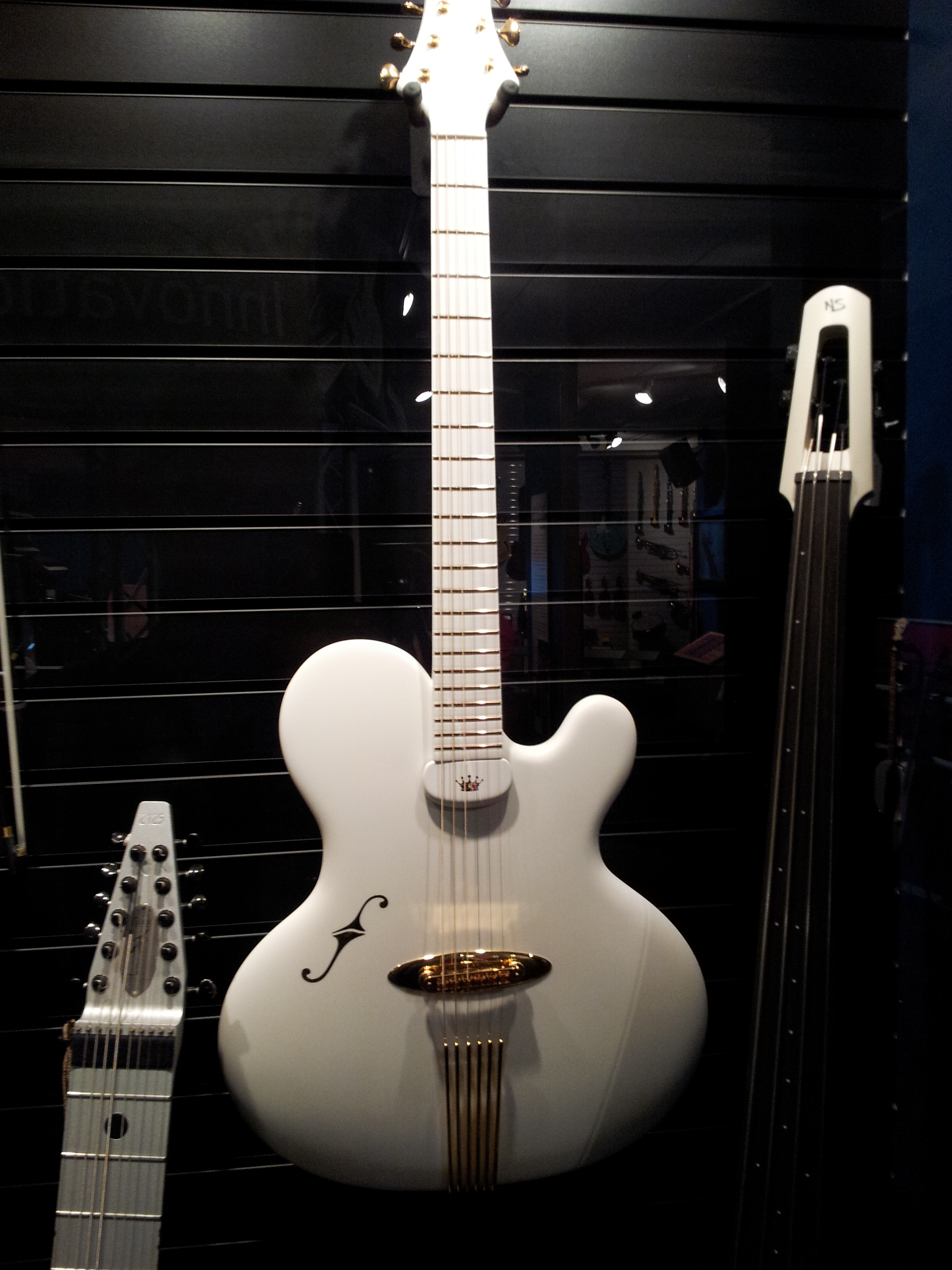
Princess Isabella Limited Edition CO Baritone guitar (exhibited at Museum of Making Music)

Released in January 2010 in a quantity of 50, The Princess Isabella is a baritone jazz guitar concept instrument with several uncommon features. Inspired by a conversation with a collector, the solid body instrument is meant to emulate the sound of a hollow body. To achieve this, a bridge incorporating hand-cast brass bows for each string is used. Other unusual features include a body thickness of one inch, a nut made from rendered cow bone, and 24 carat gold finished bridge components.

== Ritter Bass Guitars ==
=== Models ===
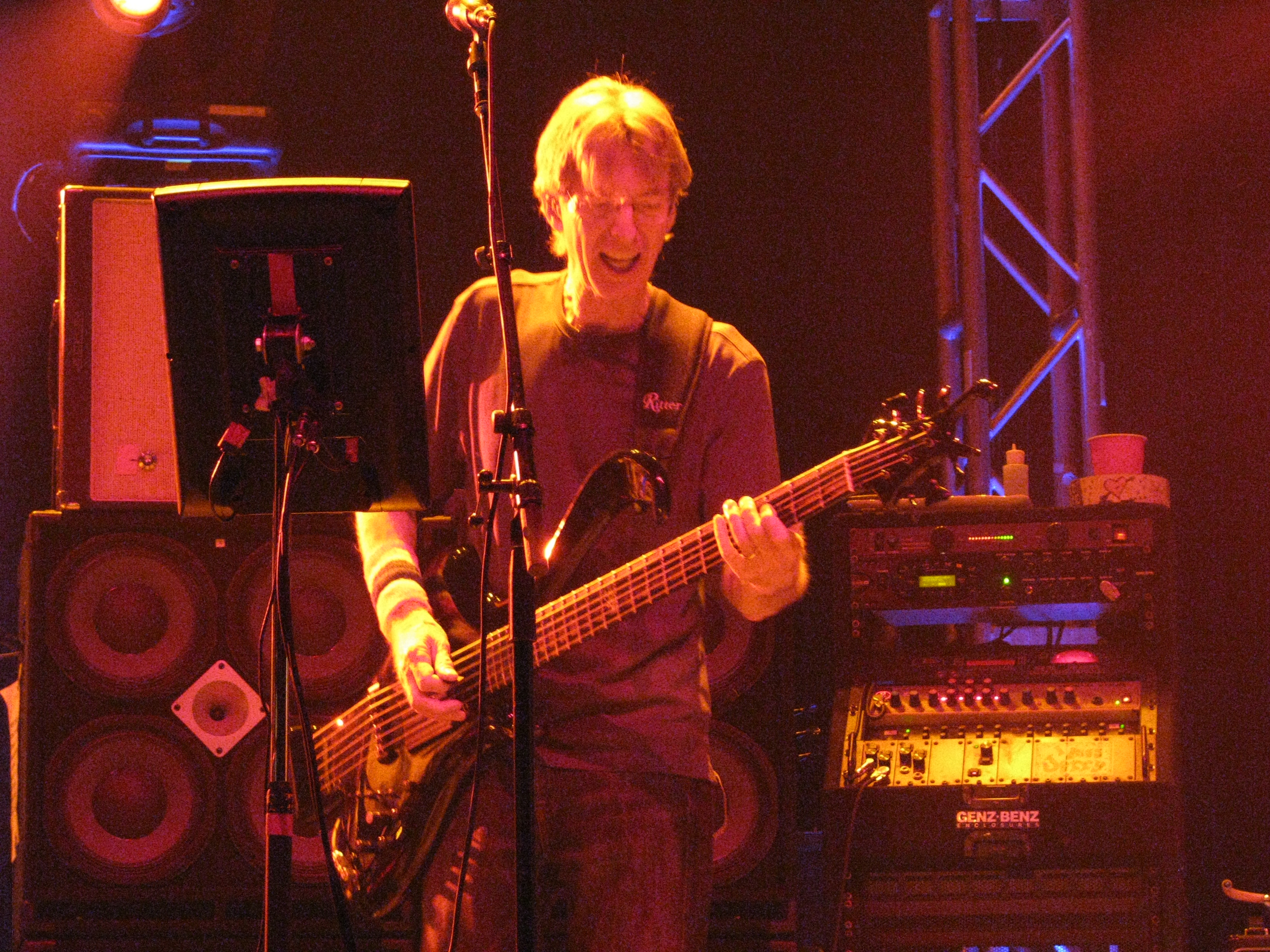
Phil Lesh with "EYE OF HORUS", 6 string Jupiter with a custom string spacing (bridge 74mm - nut 44mm)

Ritter Basses come in the following models, each with its own body shape and features: The Classic (discontinued), The Roya, The Okon, The Seal, The Jupiter and The Raptor. In 2010 Jens introduced The Cora model co-designed with bassist Josh Dunham (Prince). The R8-Singlecut was introduced in 2012 followed by the R8-Singlecut Concept in 2013 and the Okon Concept in 2015.

=== Pickups and electronics ===
Ritter pickups are made with rare-earth magnets, with covers typically made from ebony.

- Masterbar pickups - Each Masterbar consists of two active and one passive coil and be switched between a classic humbucker sound and a pure "humfree" singlecoil sound. The Bridge Pickup is inserted at an angle of 3° and the Neck Pickup is inserted at an angle of 7° to produce a more even response between strings.
- Slimbucker pickups - Ritter Slimbuckers are humbucking single coil pickups. Like Masterbars, the Bridge Pickup is inserted at an angle of 3° and the Neck Pickup is inserted at an angle of 7°.
- The Quattro-Bucker pickup - A Four-Coil pickup installed in the Jupiter model.

Ritter Master Electronics

The controls include a Master Volume (Push-Pull Potentiometer to switch between Active Mode and Passive Mode), Pickup Balance, Tone Blend (only available in the passive mode), a Dual Potentiometer for High Cut and Boost (on Top) and for Mid Cut and Boost (Ring) (only available in active mode), a Dual Potentiometer for Bass Cut and Boost (on Top) and Mid Frequency (Ring)(only available in active mode), Coil Switches for each MASTER BAR Pickup if installed (Up = Humbucker / Down = "Humbucking" Single Coil) and an Output Jack with integrated Power Switch.

The Master Electronics are powered by 18 Volts (two 9V batteries).

=== Ritter multi-screw neck joint ===
"The Neck Joint is a very special and mostly totally neglected sound influencing element. … After comparing different constructions (identical wood from the same tree), I developed my ”Multi screw Bolt on Neck Joint”. I always use the maximum possible amount of screw per available area. … The reason is a lower absorption of the string amplitude energy, because the absorption area (vibrations-system) is divided into 2 “oscillation-arms” with different lengths, which hardly move with the string frequency." -Jens Ritter

=== Ritter 3D bridge ===
This bridge is adjustable in all 3 dimensions, is made of heavy brass, and is lockable with a design meant to produce perfect conduction of the string oscillation.

Ritter B1 String Attachment

Each string attaches to the body separately which is meant to produce an absolutely independent tone development with sonic transparency.

=== The BB1 tremolo system ===
The optional Ritter BB1 Tremolo System operates with 4 radial miniature ball-bearings. This construction is meant to produce smooth action without the friction commonly found in classic tremolo systems. With a gear-driven spring tension adjuster, the BB1 can allow regulation of the spring tension without removing the instrument's rear cover plate.

=== Bodies, necks and fingerboards ===
In addition to the numerous shapes Ritter basses take, the bodies, body tops, necks and fingerboards are made from a large variety of woods and materials including various maples, ebonies, rosewoods, snakewood, kingwood, camphor, ash, amboina, poplar and more. Jens is known to seek out and experiment with unusual materials for his basses like 9000-year-old bog oak.

== Ritter Guitars ==
=== Models ===
After a meeting with George Benson in the spring of 2010, a variation on the Princess Isabella CO Baritone guitar was released, called the Benson Tribute. It has a scale of 24.75 inch (e.g. like a Gibson Les Paul). The fingerboard, pickup, bridge foot and truss rod cover are naturally finished. A tone and a volume pot was also added. The Benson-Tribute is one of very few solid body guitars in George Benson's guitar collection.

In 2011, the Monroe was released, followed by the PJS in 2012 and Porsch in 2015.

== Notable players ==
- Paul Turner of Jamiroquai
- Phil Lesh of Phil Lesh and Friends and The Grateful Dead
- Hellmut Hattler
- Rob Derhak of Moe
- Martin Motnik
- Josh Dunham of Prince
- Aram Bedrosian
- Doug Wimbish of Living Colour
- George Benson
- Matthias Richter of Schandmaul
- Paulo Roberto Diniz, Jr. (PJ) of Jota Quest
- Otto Waalkes (Ottifanten Guitar)
