= Hora (company) =

Romanian musical instrument maker

S.C. Hora S.A.
- Type: State-owned (1951–1994); Private (1994–present)
- Industry: Musical instruments manufacturing
- Founded: 1951; 75 years ago
- Founder: Roman Boianciuc
- Headquarters: Reghin, Romania
- Area served: Worldwide
- Products: violins and violas, cellos, double basses, acoustic, resonator and classical guitars, mandolins, balalaikas, hammer dulcimers, panflutes, musical instrument cases
- Divisions: Rapsodia
- Website: hora-factory.com

S.C. Hora S.A. (trade name: Hora Instruments) is a Romanian manufacturer of string instruments. The company, based in Reghin, was founded in 1951 around the workshop of master luthier Roman Boianciuc as a state-owned enterprise.

Over 80% of its products are exported to North America, Western and Northern Europe, Russia and Japan. HORA uses as raw materials spruce and maple wood from the Romanian Carpathians seasoned naturally for 5–10 years, as well as imported exotic wood like mahogany, Indian rosewood and ebony.

The company employs about 300 people (2017) and is the largest stringed instrument manufacturer in Europe.

== Divisions ==
Hora owns and operates the "Rapsodia" musical instruments shop in Bucharest, founded in 1999.

== Quality policies and standards ==
- SR ISO 9001:2001
- SR ISO 14001:2005
- OHSAS 18001:1999

== See also ==
- Violin making and maintenance
- Violin construction and mechanics
- Classical guitar making
- Lutherie
