= Vintage Guitars =

British guitar manufacturer

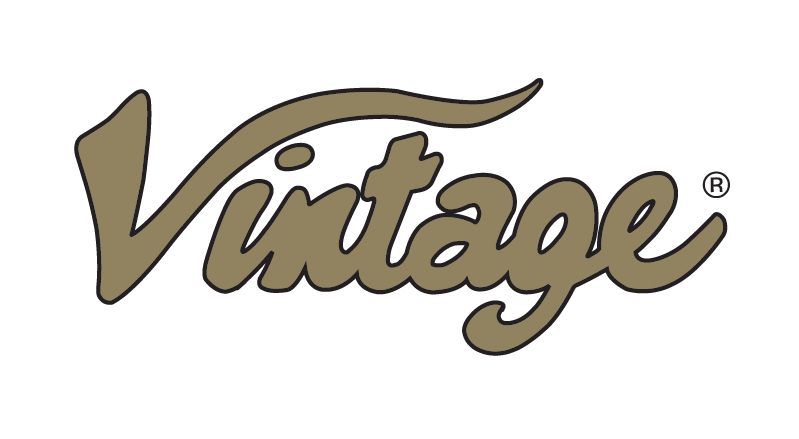

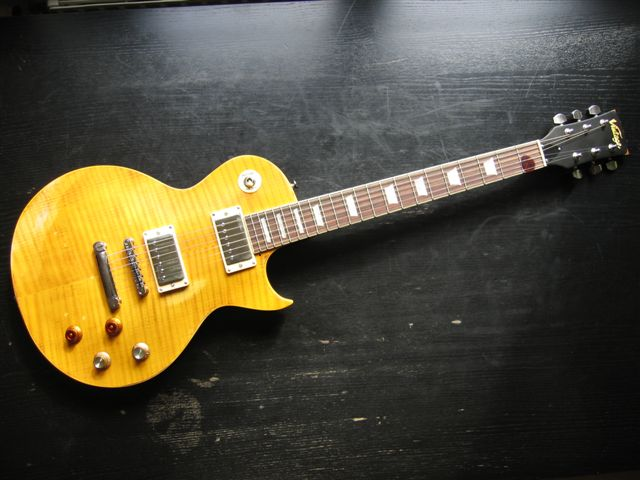
- Vintage V100MRPGM Lemon Drop
- Type: Private
- Industry: Musical instruments
- Founded: 1995; 31 years ago
- Headquarters: Isernhagen, Germany
- Area served: Global
- Products: Guitars: electric, acoustic; Electric basses; Amplification, FX pedals, accessories, and merchandise
- Owner: Musik Wein GmbH
- Website: vintageguitarsus.com

Vintage (brand) Guitars is a manufacturer of electric guitars, acoustic guitars and bass guitars founded in 1995.

The brand also produces amplification, FX pedals, accessories, and merchandise.

The Vintage brand is owned by German music products distributor Musik Wein GmbH.

== History ==
The first guitar series by Vintage called VC1 came out in 1995. In collaboration with Trevor Wilkinson (originator of Fret-King)

Vintage's goal was to manufacture affordable but well-made vintage-looking guitars.

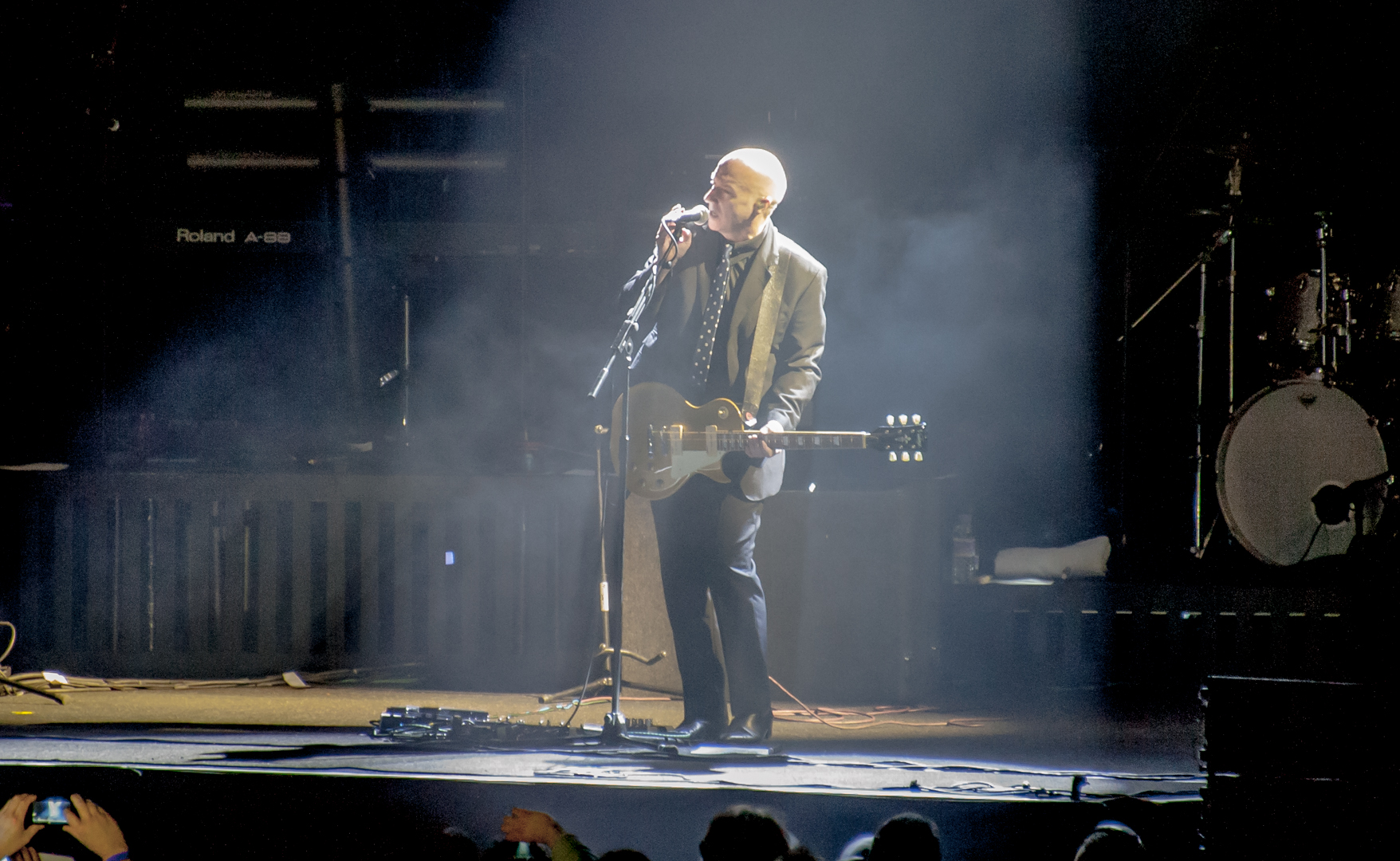
Midge Ure on stage with his signature Vintage V100

Instruments manufactured by Vintage have been used by notable rock, heavy metal and country musicians, including Scott Sharrard, Fred Mollin, Billy Sherwood, John Payne, Dave Colwell, Peter Baltes and Nick Kane. Paul Brett worked as a guitar designer for Vintage. The brand has collaborated with Joe Doe Guitars. Vintage has designed signature model guitars for Thomas Blug, Jerry Donahue, Tony Butler and Midge Ure.

In 2020, due to the brand's 25th anniversary, the "25th Anniversary Series" of V75, V6H and V100, which are considered Vintage's best-selling models, were released, limited to 100 pieces each. In 2022, then owner JHS gifted a Vintage acoustic-electric guitar to a homeless Malvern Link busker who had his Yamaha guitar stolen.

The Vintage brand was owned by UK musical instrument distributors John Hornby Skewes and Co. Ltd. (also known as JHS.) But after the company announced it was closing in 2025, they began a search for a new owner for Vintage.

It was announced in September 2026 that German music products distributor Musik Wein GmbH would take over the ownership and distribution rights of the brand.

== Reception ==
Matt McCracken of Guitar.com noted that "Vintage made its name mixing homegrown design ingenuity with overseas manufacturing to deliver impressive value for money." Dave Burrluck of MusicRadar in his review of Vintage VSA500 (based on Gibson ES-335) acknowledged the brand's "copy-cat status", but concluded that "the guitars might be slight in price but [...] they are far from generic guitar-shaped objects. For the asking price this semi is excellent as is and maybe with a few personalised tweaks could become a serious keeper."
