= Wandre Guitars =

Electric guitar brand

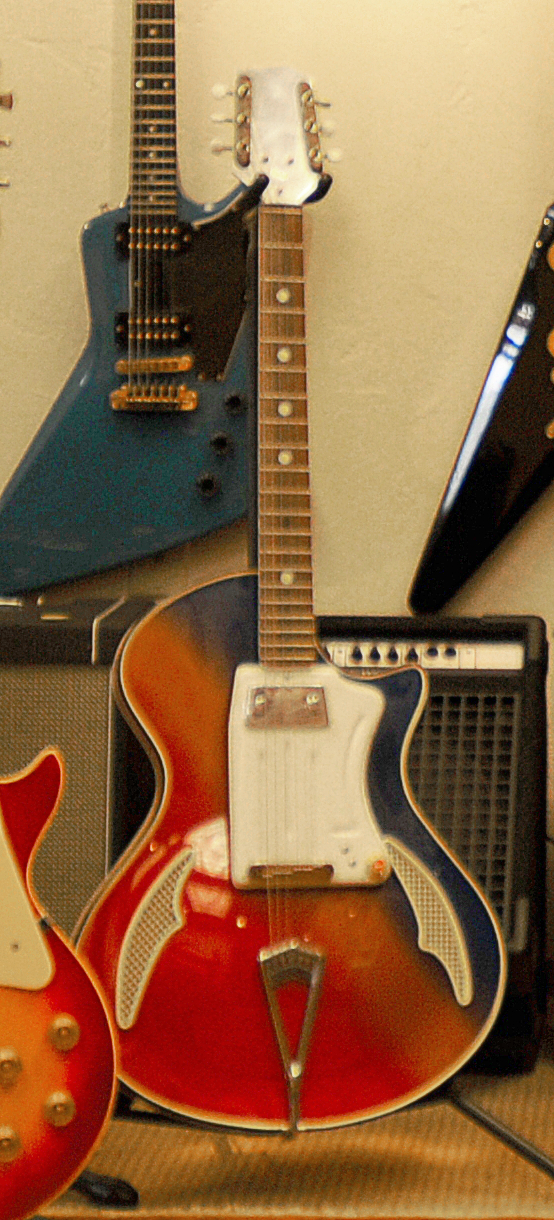
Wandre Blue Jeans or Teenager, also nicknamed Tri-Lam (Note: The name Trilam is not by Wandrè, but it has been advertised on second-hand ads.(Ballestri 2014)) (1960s)

Wandre Guitars is an electric guitar brand started by the Italian guitar manufacturer Antonio Vandrè Pioli and originally designed and manufactured from 1957 to 1968. These guitars are famous for their original shapes, aluminium necks and unique switches.

== History ==
Wandrè was created by Antonio Pioli, known professionally as Wandrè. He was born on 6 June 1926 in Cavriago, in the province of Reggio Emilia, Italy where he learned luthiery in his father's workshop and later developed his own approach to guitar construction and industrial design.

Pioli established a factory in Cavriago designed around a circular layout intended to streamline the different stages of instrument production. His work reflected the broader climate of industrial experimentation and manufacturing growth in northern Italy during the postwar period.

Seeking to address problems of neck warping common in some Italian-made guitars of the period, Pioli developed the "Trilam" neck system, a laminated neck construction designed to improve strength and stability.

Very small productions were made, which makes these guitars very sought after in the vintage guitar market. Some guitars by Pioli have appeared under other brand names such as Framez, Davoli, Dallas, Avalon, Noble, Lipsky.

Wandrè guitars have been associated with several Italian and international musicians, including Adriano Celentano, Frank Zappa and Buddy Miller.

== Design ==
Wandrè instruments were noted for their experimental construction methods and futuristic industrial design. The visual design of Wandrè guitars departed significantly from conventional American electric guitar aesthetics of the period, incorporating asymmetrical forms, aluminium hardware and modernist styling associated with postwar Italian industrial design.

Some models used the "Trilam" neck system, a multi-layered laminated neck construction intended to increase strength and stability while reducing warping.

== Models ==
Wandre made a lot of models of doublebasses, basses and guitars

- Classic doublebass
- Pocket bass
- Naika doublebass
- Marte duoblebass
- Quarieg doublebass
- Electro Blitz Bass
- Swedenbass
- Roc'n'Roll
- Brigitte Bardot
- Calypso
- Rock Oval
- Waid
- Selene
- Rock
- Spazial
- Blue Jeans / Teenager / Trilam
- Piper
- Bikini
- Twist
- Tigre
- Doris
- Polyphon
- Cobra
- Etrurian
- Powertone
- Soloist
- Psychedelic Sound
- Mini

== Revival ==
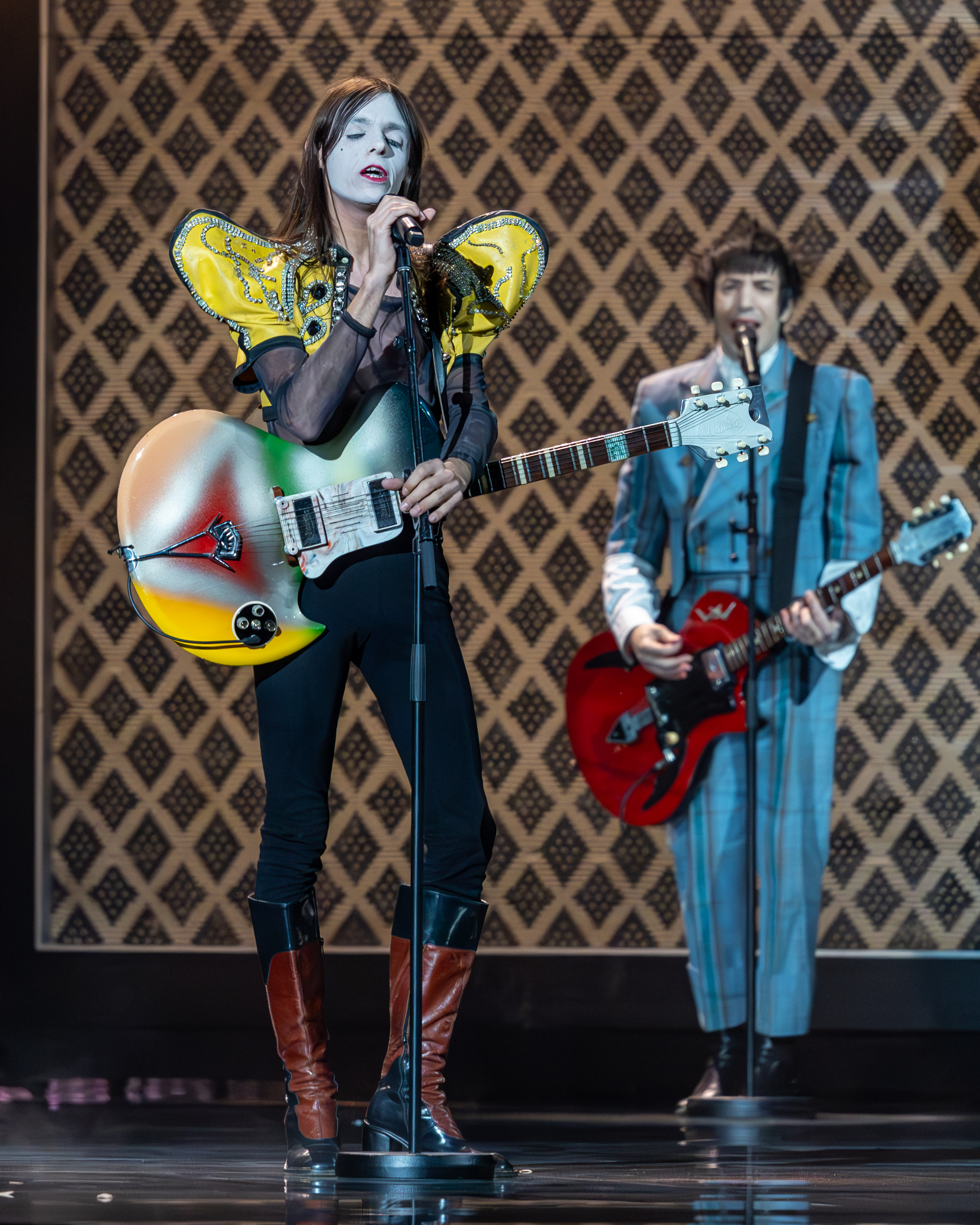

Wandrè guitars later developed a cult following among collectors and musicians interested in experimental and visually unconventional instruments. The company's designs influenced later revival-oriented manufacturers including Eastwood Guitars, which has cited Wandrè instruments as part of the broader "pawnshop guitar" tradition.

Wandrè guitars received renewed international attention following the appearance of Italian singer-songwriter Lucio Corsi at the Eurovision Song Contest 2025, during which he performed using a vintage Wandrè guitar. Italian media and music publications noted the instrument's distinctive futuristic design, contributing to renewed public interest in the brand and its association with postwar Italian experimental guitar manufacturing.

== Legacy ==
In 2024, the Museo internazionale e biblioteca della musica in Bologna hosted the exhibition Wandré – The Guitar of the Future, dedicated to Antonio Pioli and the history of Wandrè instruments.

== Notes ==
- Ballestri, Marco (2014). Wandrè. L'artista della chitarra elettrica [Wandrè. The artist of electric guitar] (in Italian and English). Modena: Anniversary Books. ISBN 978-88-96408-16-2.
  (See also excerpted photographs: "Wandrè's guitars". Archived from the original on 2014-10-20 – via AnniversaryBooks.it.)
