= Tanglewood Guitars =

English musical instrument manufacturer

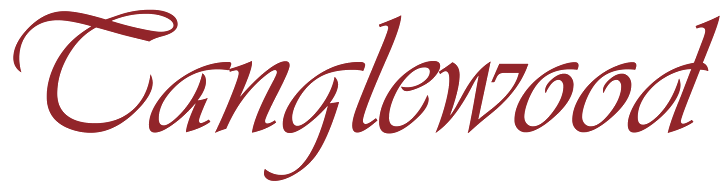

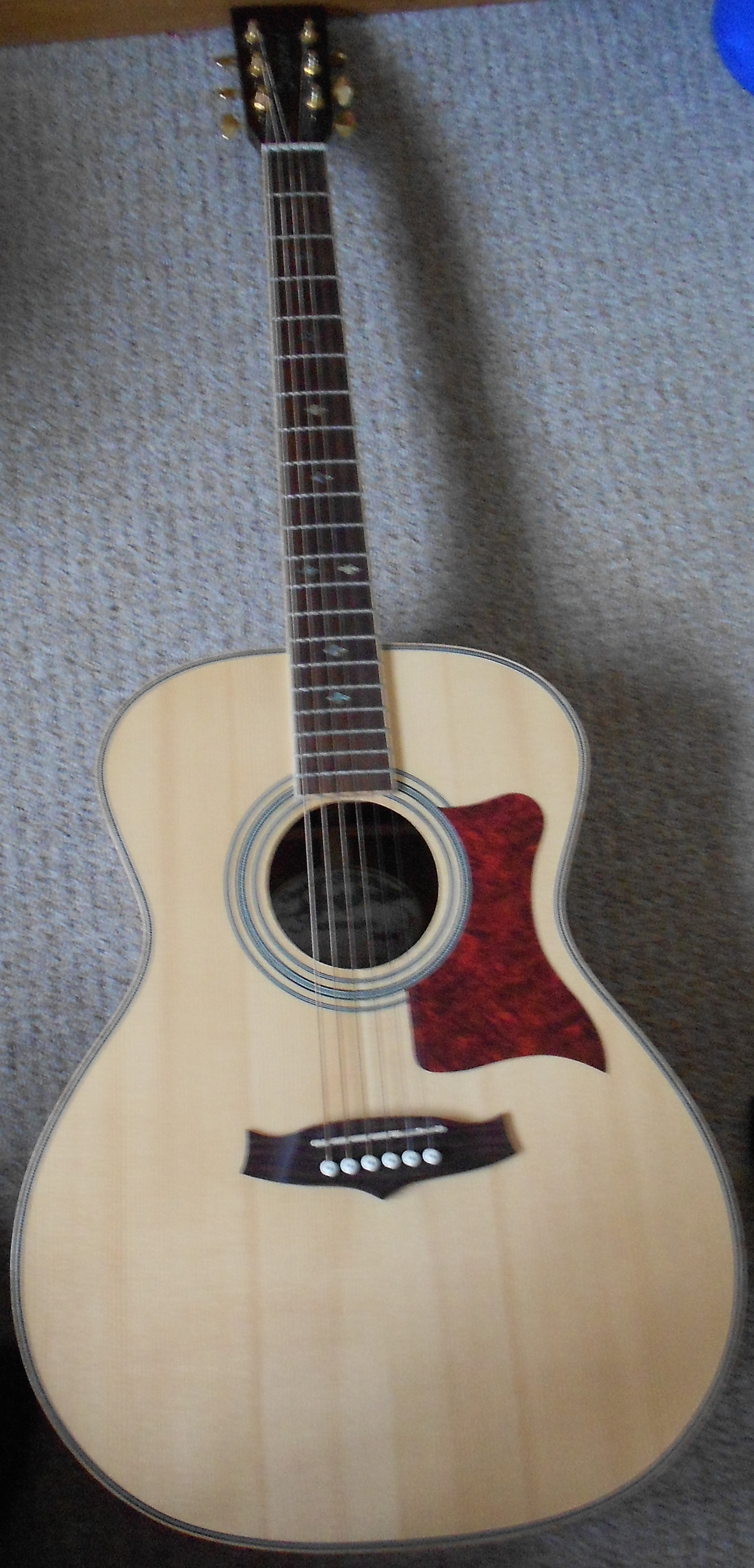
- A Tanglewood guitar
- Industry: Musical instruments
- Founded: 1988; 38 years ago
- Headquarters: London, England
- Area served: Worldwide
- Products: Electric, acoustic and classical guitars; Basses; Banjos; Mandolins; Ukuleles; Amplifiers
- Website: tanglewoodguitars.co.uk

Tanglewood Guitars is an English manufacturer of stringed instruments, including electric, steel-string acoustic and classical guitars, bass guitars, banjos, mandolins, ukuleles, and guitar amplifiers.

Instruments are designed in the United Kingdom and manufactured in China with detailed photos of guitar models listed for second hand sale online showing that guitar manufacture for Tanglewood has also previously been carried out in Indonesia and South Korea.

== History ==
Tanglewood Guitars was founded in London in 1988 and later moved to Biggin Hill, Kent, and opened additional warehouse space in Wetherby, Yorkshire. In 2005, the company began distributing their products in the United States. Tanglewood Guitars received a sales award from MI Pro Trade magazine in 2007, 2008 and 2009. Tanglewood guitars are sold in more than 40 countries. The product range over time has diversified from acoustics, such as the TW line, through to many models and ranges. These include solid-body electrics inspired by solid body Fender (FST), Gibson (TE), or Rickenbacker (AR designs), hollow-body models inspired by the Telecaster Thinline or Gibson 335, and in-house designs such as the TSB range.
