= M.V. Pedulla Guitars =

M.V. Pedulla
- Company type: Private
- Industry: Musical instruments
- Founded: Massachusetts (1975; 51 years ago)
- Founder: Michael V. Pedulla
- Headquarters: Boston, Massachusetts
- Area served: Global
- Products: Bass guitars
- Owner: Michael V. Pedulla
- Website: Pedulla - Official site

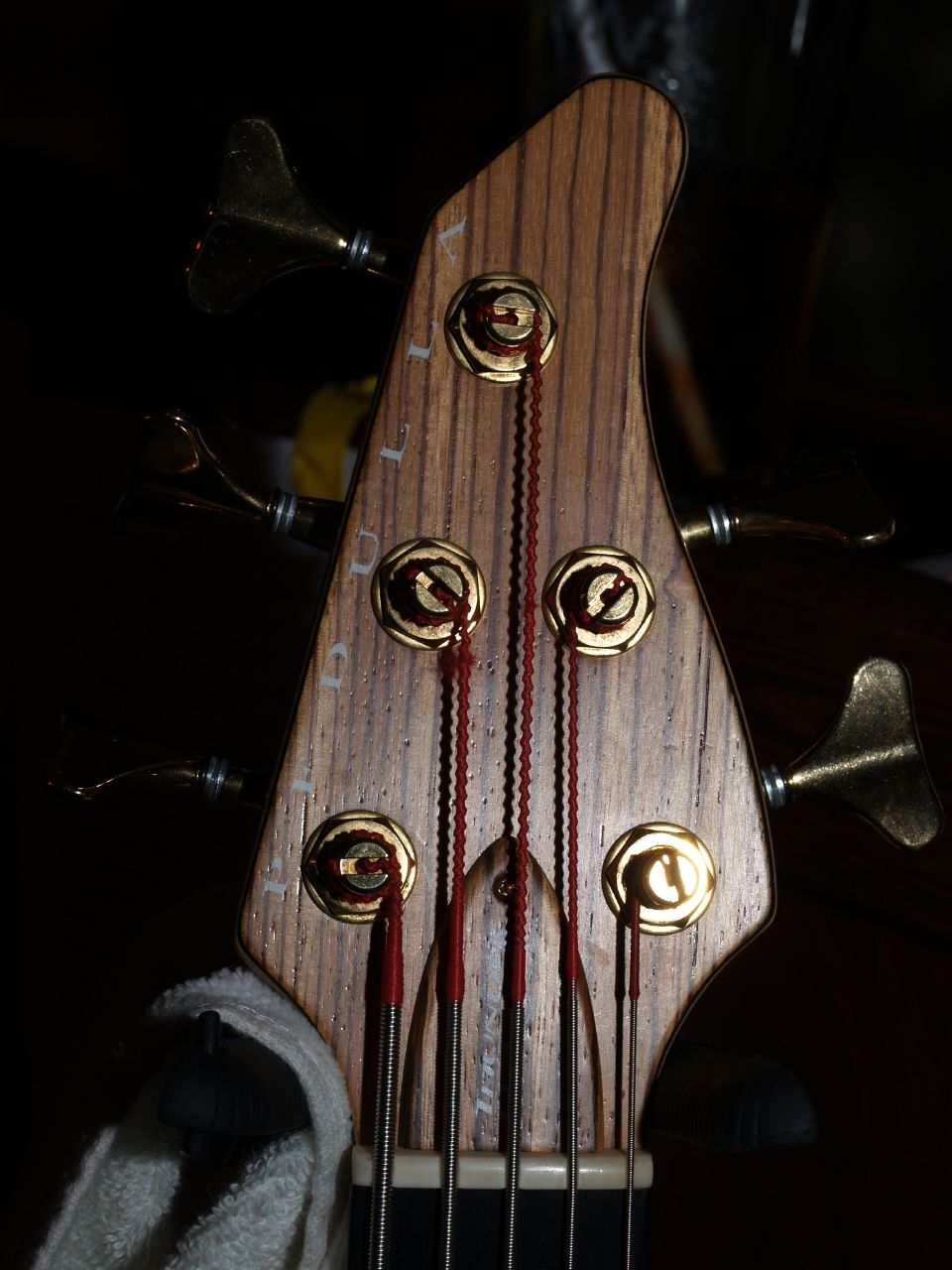
M.V.Pedulla Thunderbass headstock

Pedulla was an American manufacturer of electric bass guitars from near Boston, Massachusetts.

The catalog included different series of bass guitars: the Rapture (modern Fender bass clones, 4 and 5 strings), the Thunderbass, the Nuance and the Thunderbolt, respectively neck-through and bolt-on modern bass, and the MVP and Buzz bass, respectively fretted and fretless bass who made Pedulla quite famous in the 1980 decade. Thunderbass, Thunderbolt, Nuance, MVP and Buzz models were available in 4, 5, 6 and 8 string formats, all Made in USA. Pedulla basses were provided with custom Bartolini pickups and electronics, still supported by Bartolini and a limited selection of options.

Michael Pedulla's vision was to build a solid, outstanding bass that was the result of long experiments and limiting the personalization to the features, like colors of painting and color of hardware, that do not affect sounds.

Mike Pedulla announced his retirement in May 2019, and the company ceased its operations after 45 years and 10,000 basses produced.
