= Tagima =

Brazilian guitar manufacturer

- Company type: Private
- Industry: Musical instruments
- Founded: 1986
- Headquarters: São Bernardo do Campo, SP, Brazil
- Products: Electric, acoustic and classical guitars, basses
- Parent: Marutec
- Website: tagima.com.br

Tagima is a Brazilian guitar manufacturing company based in São Bernardo do Campo, São Paulo. The name Tagima comes from Seizi Tagima (田嶋せいじ, Tajima Seiji), a Japanese descendant who learned to craft guitars just by watching the process.

The company currently produces electric, acoustic, classical guitars and bass guitars as well as drum kits.

The company was originally founded in 1986 by luthier Seizi Tagima, who began to produce his own electric guitars and basses. After becoming successful, in 1996 he sold the rights of the "Tagima" brand to Marutec Music, which upon acquiring the rights to Tagima, started working on constructing the brand and took it to a national level while Seizi Tagima kept helping its development.

After the sale to Marutec, Tagima instruments were exhibited at MusikMesse (in Frankfurt) and NAMM Show in Los Angeles, the company launched the Memphis, a new line of acoustic, electric and bass guitars. The company also signed an agreement with the IG&T (Guitar and Technology Institute of São Paulo) to be the exclusive supplier of instruments of the school.

Tagima also hired luthier Marcio Zaganin, who is currently responsible for the development, production, and quality control of instruments manufactured by Tagima. The company then released the Tagima Acoustic, Woodstock, America Series and Canada series as a means of expanding upon the existing Signature Series of instruments.

In 2012, the brand was featured in the Brazilian magazine Musica&Mercado (Music & Markets) in reference to its status in the Brazilian market. In which occasion was also announced a change in the company to a new headquarters location and an entry into the manufacturing of Drums with the Nagano brand.

In 2016, the company launched the new Tagima Brazil with new instruments such as the Jet Blues and Rocker.

In 2017, Tagima officialized its entrance in the north American market with the brand Tagima USA, including its own stand as an appearance in NAMM Show.

Tagima also partnered with Volkswagen to create a Volkswagen Gol vintage model to celebrate the 30th anniversary of the vehicle.

== Gallery ==
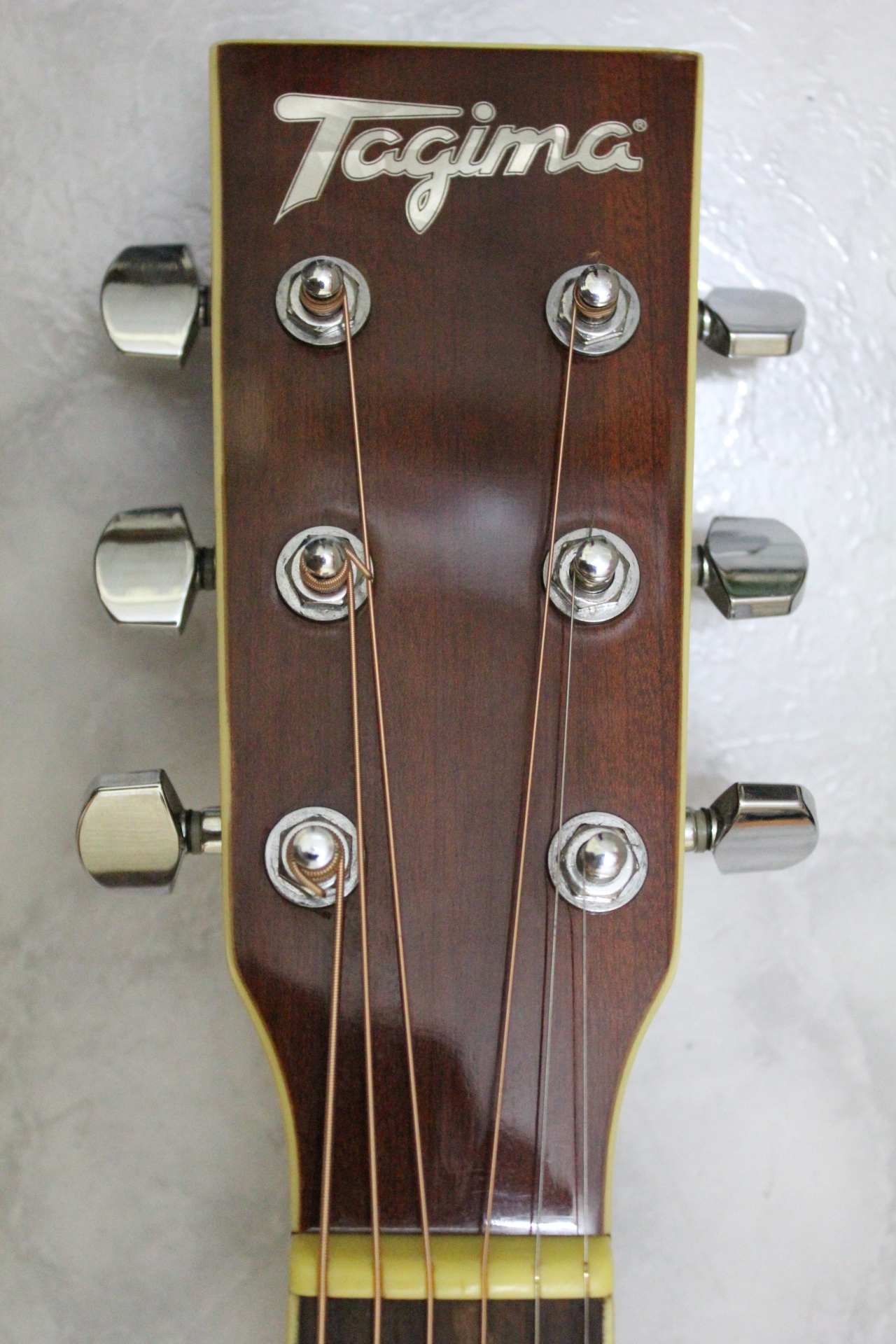
Headstock of Tagima Dallas acoustic guitar

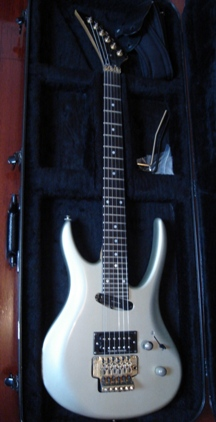
Tagima Zero

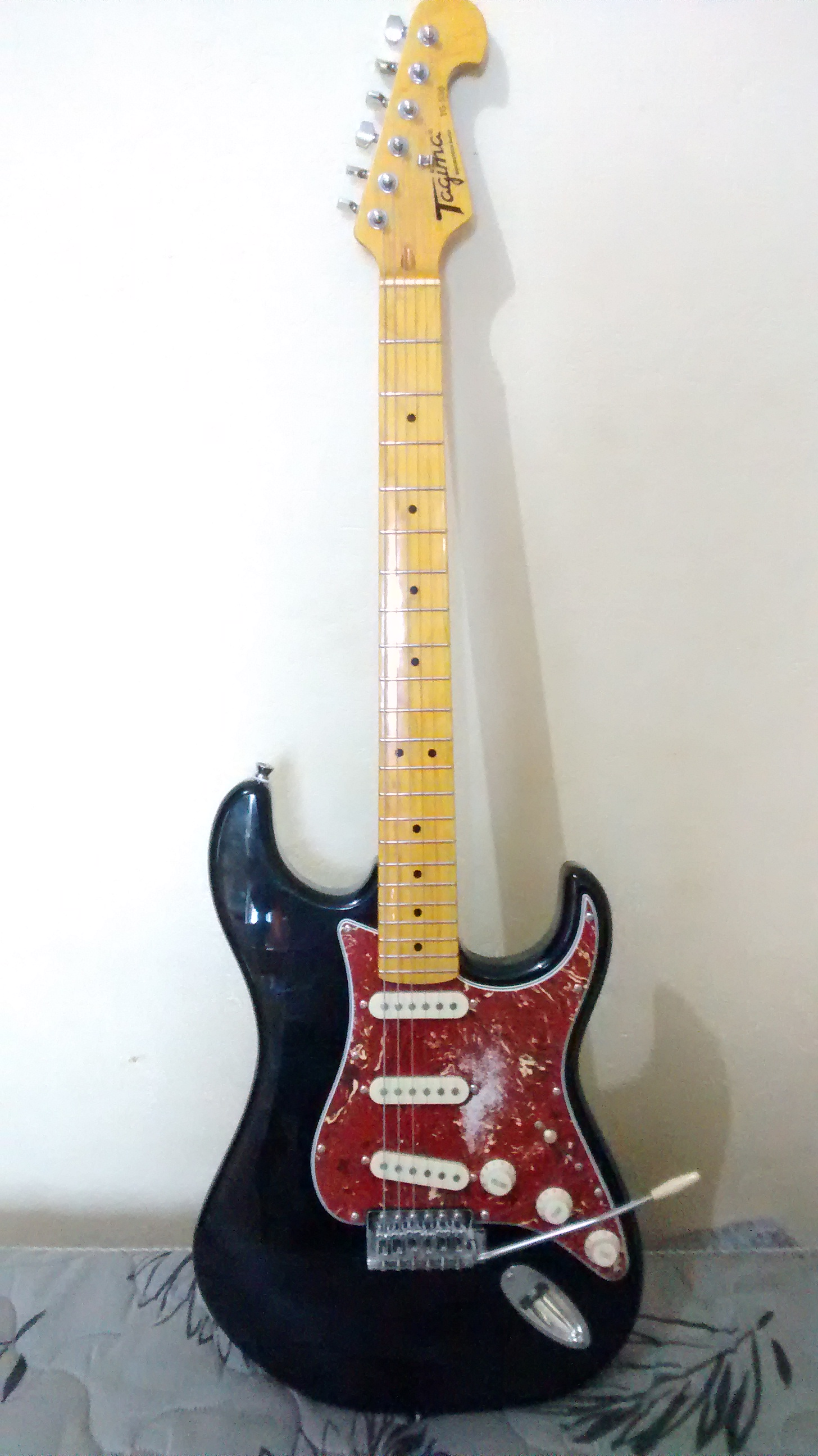
Tagima TG-530
