= Bass guitar tuning =

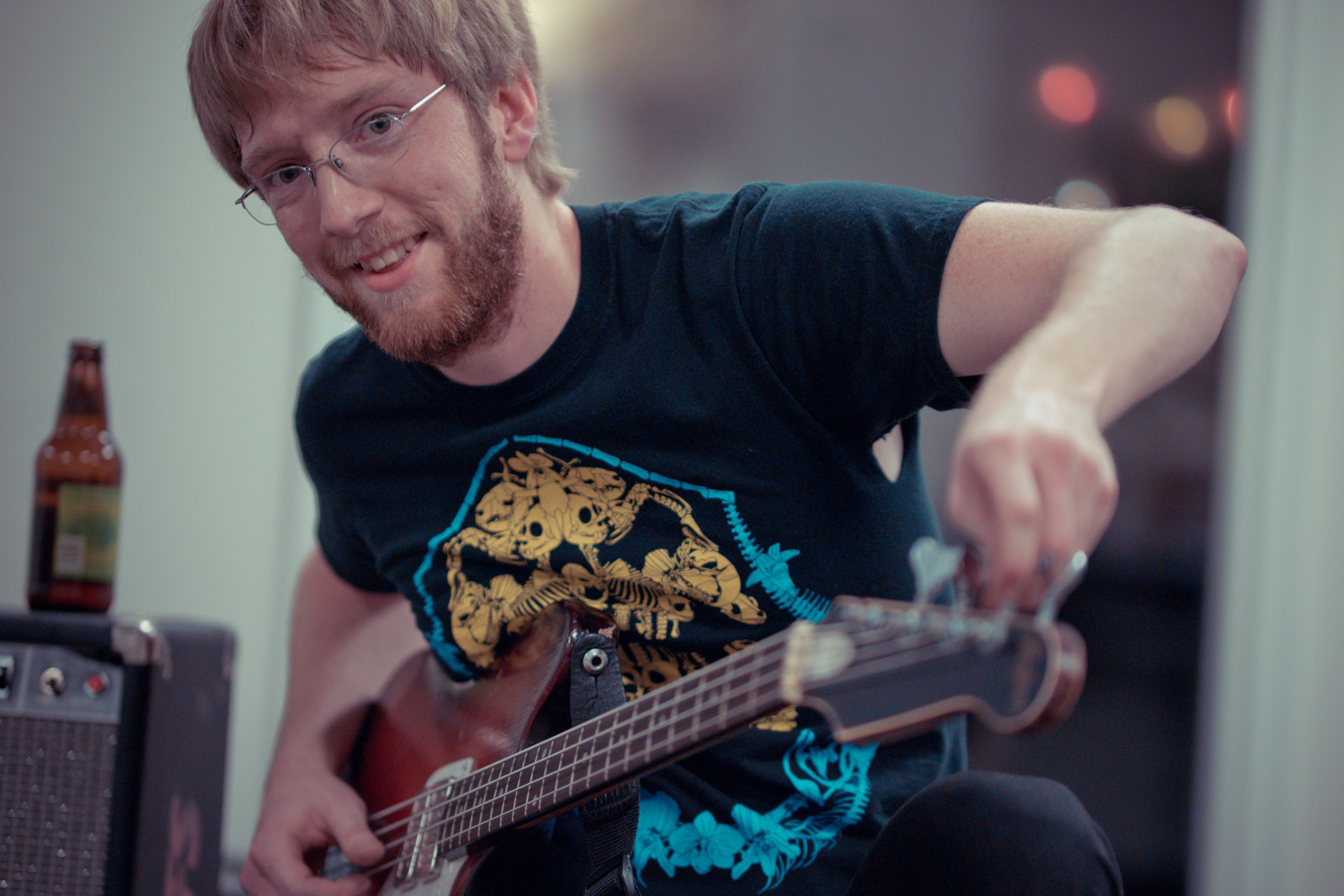
A bass guitarist tuning his instrument.

Each bass guitar tuning assigns pitches to the strings of an electric bass. Because pitches are associated with notes, bass-guitar tunings assign open notes to open strings. There are several techniques for accurately tuning the strings of an electric bass. Bass method or lesson books introduce one or more tuning techniques, such as:

- By ear to the sounded reference pitch of a piano, since a piano typically remains tuned much longer than a guitar, and electronic pianos are perpetually in tune.
- By ear to the sound of a tuning fork or pitch pipe, which lets you get one pitch on one string correct. Then, use relative tuning (below) to adjust the other strings.
- By ear to the sound of a guitar. On a four string bass guitar, its strings are pitched one octave lower than the four lowest pitched strings of a guitar. Tune them identically, without the octave interval, by pressing the 12th fret of each string on the bass.
- By electric tuner, tuner app program on a smartphone, or tuning tools on a website, which pick up the audible sound through a microphone, or physical vibrations when attached to the instrument, or the electromagnetic waves through the pickup and instrument patch cable. These indicate when strings are tuned by visual and audio cues.
- By ear using relative tuning, using known pitch intervals or chromatic tones played between an already tuned string and one that needs tuning. This is colloquially known as "tuning the bass to itself". The instrument tuned in this manner can be played alone, but it may not be in tune with other instruments, such as a piano, if no reference pitch was used. This technique may also be used for slightly obscure "visual" or "haptic" tuning - by pressing appropriate frets that should make the strings unison the vibrations from one string will be picked up by the other string which will start vibrating (when tuned correctly). This may be observed visually or felt by gently touching the unplayed string.

While tuning is mainly done prior to performances, musicians may tune again during a show, typically between songs, either to correct the tuning of the instrument (heat, humidity, string bending, and heavy playing all affect tuning), or to change to a new tuning, such as dropping the pitch of the E string to D for a song in D major. Amateur musicians tune their own bass, but touring professionals in bands may have a bass tech who tunes their basses.

== Overview ==
Most bass guitars have four strings, which are tuned one octave lower than the lowest pitched four strings of an electric guitar E, A, D, G using the equal temperament tuning method and standard pitch. The bass guitar is a transposing instrument, as it is notated in bass clef an octave higher than it sounds, to reduce the need for ledger lines in music written for the instrument, and simplify reading.

Thus, on a score the notes of each string would be written as shown in the following image.

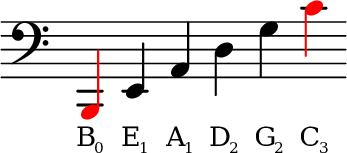
Notation for notes of a 6 strings bass guitar; black notes are those of a 4-strings bass

4 string	4 string (tenor)	5 string	5 string (tenor)	6 string	Note	Frequency	Alternative 4 string notes	Alternative 4 string tunings
	1		1	1	C_{3}	130.813 Hz		
1	2	1	2	2	G_{2}	97.999 Hz	G	G♭, F, E, E♭
2	3	2	3	3	D_{2}	73.416 Hz	D	D♭, C, B, B♭
3	4	3	4	4	A_{1}	55 Hz	A	A♭, G, G♭, F
4		4	5	5	E_{1}	41.203 Hz	E	E♭, D, D♭, C
		5		6	B_{0}	30.868 Hz		

== Strings and tuning ==
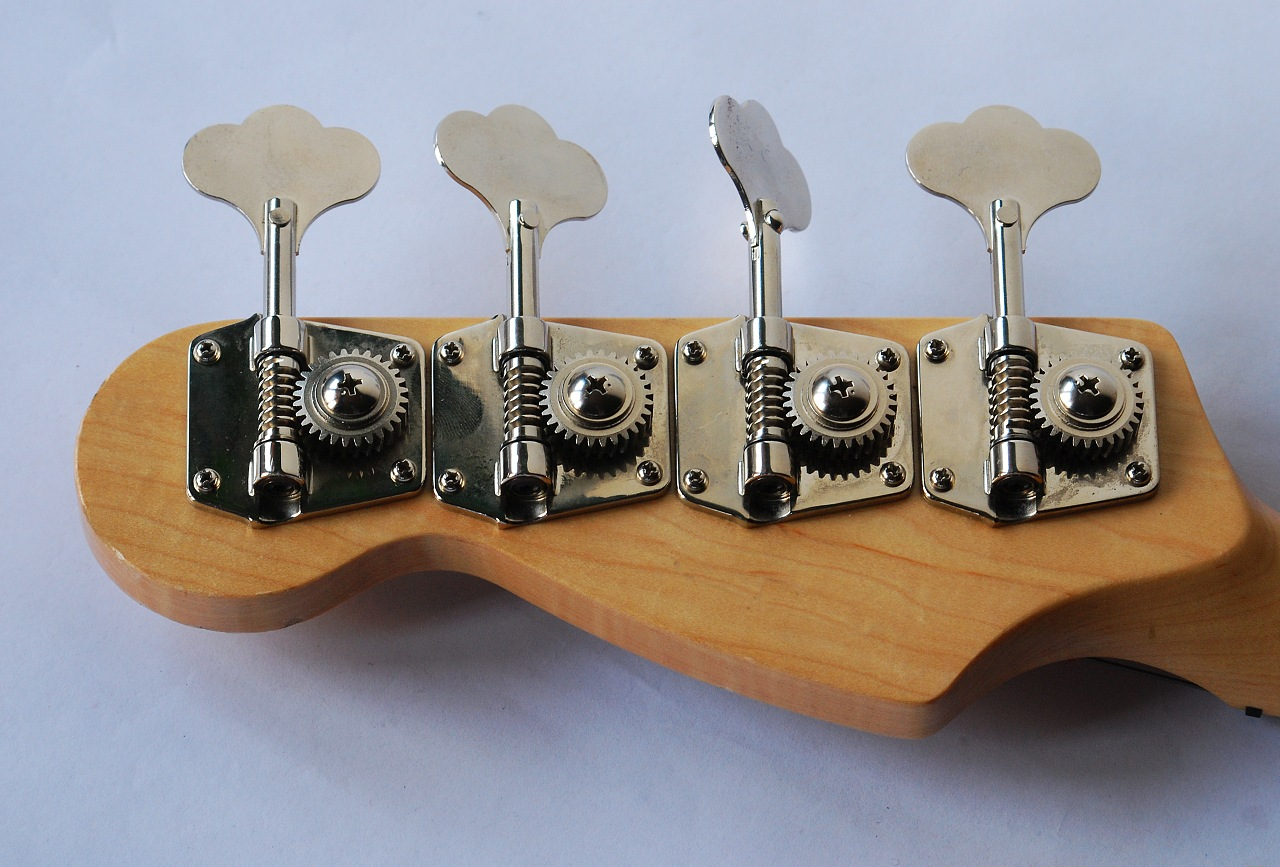
Tuning machines (with spiral metal worm gears) are mounted on the back of the headstock on the bass guitar neck

The standard design for the electric bass guitar has four strings, tuned E, A, D and G, in fourths such that the open highest string, G, is an eleventh (an octave and a fourth) below middle C, making the tuning of all four strings the same as that of the double bass (E_{1}–A_{1}–D_{2}–G_{2}). This tuning is also the same as the standard tuning on the lower-pitched four strings on a six-string guitar, only an octave lower.

There is a range of different string types, which are available in many various metals, windings, and finishes. Each combination has specific tonal characteristics, interaction with pickups, and "feel" to the player's hands.

Variables include wrap finish (roundwound, flatwound, halfwound, ground wound, and pressure wound), as well as metal strings with different coverings (tapewound or plastic covered). In the 1950s and early 1960s, bassists mostly used flatwound strings with a smooth surface, which have a smooth, damped sound reminiscent of a double bass. In the late 1960s and 1970s, players began using roundwound bass strings, which produce a brighter tone similar to steel guitar strings, and a brighter timbre (tone) with longer sustain than flatwounds.

A variety of tuning options and number of string courses (courses are when strings are put together in groups of two, often at the unison or octave) have been used to extend the range of the instrument, or facilitate different modes of playing, or allow for different playing sounds.

- Four strings can obtain an extended lower range through thicker strings or "down-tuning." Tunings such as B–E–A–D (this requires a low "B" string in addition to the other three "standard" strings, and omits the G string), D–A–D–G (a "standard" set of strings, with only the lowest string detuned from E down to D), and D–G–C–F or C–G–C–F (a "standard" set of strings, all of which are detuned either a whole tone, or a whole tone for the three higher-pitched strings and two tones for the E, which is dropped to a low C) give bassists an extended lower range. A tenor bass tuning of A–D–G–C, in which the low E is omitted and a high C is added, provides a higher range. Tuning in fifths e.g., C–G–D–A (like a violoncello but an octave lower) gives an extended upper and lower range. Further, some players prefer to tune their basses with a "Low G" (G_{0}). Often, this requires a large-gauge string which replaces the E-string, and the other strings are often lowered as well in this sort of tuning.

Note positions on a right-handed four-string bass in standard E–A–D–G tuning (from lowest-pitched string to the highest-pitched string, shown in sharps), shown up to the 12th fret, where the pattern repeats. The dots below the frets are often inlaid into the wood of bass necks, as a visual aid to help the player find different positions.

Note positions on a right-handed five-string bass in standard B–E–A–D–G tuning (from lowest-pitched string to the highest-pitched string, shown in flats), shown up to the 12th fret, where the pattern repeats. The dots below the frets are often inlaid into the wood of bass necks, as a visual aid to help the player find different positions.

- Five strings usually tuned B_{0}–E_{1}–A_{1}–D_{2}–G_{2}, providing extended lower range. The earliest commercial five-string bass was created by Fender in 1965. The Fender Bass V used the E–A–D–G–C tuning, but was unpopular and discontinued in 1970. This tenor tuning is still used by some jazz and soloing bassists. The low-B five-string was created by Jimmy Johnson in 1975, modifying an E–A–D–G–C five-string Alembic bass, with a different nut and a low-B string from GHS. Carl Thompson finished a purpose-built five-string bass with a low-B in May 1976, one year after completing the first six-string for Anthony Jackson (see below). Steinberger made a 5-string headless instrument called the L-2/5 in 1982, and later Yamaha offered its first production model as the BB5000 in 1984.

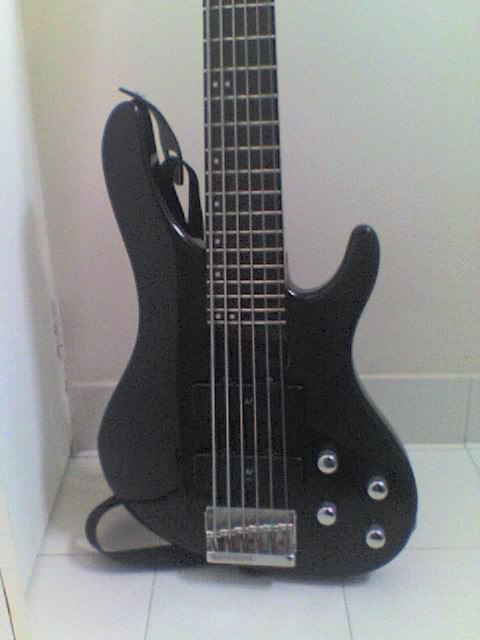
Washburn XB600, a six string bass

- Six strings are usually tuned B_{0}–E_{1}–A_{1}–D_{2}–G_{2}–C_{3}—like a four-string bass with an additional low B string and a high C string. Some players prefer B_{0}–E_{1}–A_{1}–D_{2}–F♯_{2}–B_{2}, which preserves the intervals of standard six-string guitar tuning (an octave and a fourth lower) and makes the highest and lowest string the same note two octaves apart. While less common than four or five-string basses, they appear in Latin, jazz, and other genres, as well as in studio work where a session musician's single instrument must be highly versatile, and to facilitate sightreading in the recording studio. In 1974, Anthony Jackson worked with Carl Thompson to create the first Contrabass guitar (BEADGC). Later, Jackson brought his ideas to Fodera and worked with Ken Smith to create a wider-spaced Contrabass guitar, which evolved to the modern six-string bass.
- Eight and twelve-string models are both built on the same "course string" concept found on twelve-string guitars, where sets of strings are spaced together in groups of two or three that are primarily played simultaneously. These instruments typically have one of the strings in each course tuned an octave above the 'standard' string, although a fifth above is also used. Instruments with ten and fifteen strings, grouped in five courses, also exist, as do "extended-range basses" or ERBs with non-coursed string counts rivaling those of coursed-string basses.

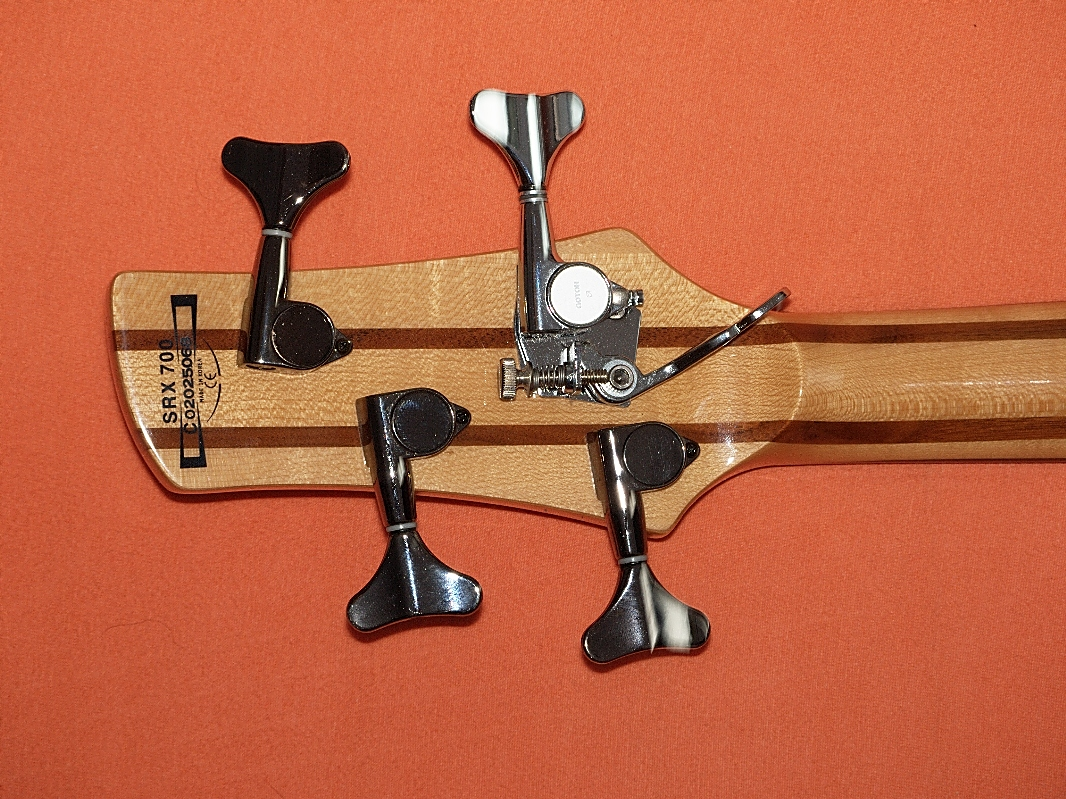
A bass guitar headstock with detuner set to D position

- Detuners are mechanical devices the player operates with the thumb on the fretting hand to quickly retune one or more strings to a pre-set lower pitch. On standard four-string basses, detuners are most often used to drop the E-string down to D. On basses with five or more strings, they typically drop the B-string down to a B♭. Some bassists (e.g., Michael Manring) add detuners to more than one string, or even more than one detuner to each string, so they can quickly access alternate tunings, especially during live performances.

=== Alternative range approaches ===
Some bassists use unusual tunings to extend the range or get other benefits, such as providing multiple octaves of notes at any given position, or a larger tonal range. Instrument types or tunings used for this purpose include basses with fewer than four strings: one-string bass guitars, two-string bass guitars (Mark Sandman of the band morphine modified a Premier Multivox Scroll bass to only use two strings which he would play with a slide). three-string bass guitars (session bassist Tony Levin commissioned Music Man to build a three-string version of his favorite Stingray bass). As well as alternative tunings (e.g., tenor bass); tuned A–D–G–C, like the top 4 strings of a six-string bass, or simply a standard four-string with the strings each tuned up an additional perfect fourth. Tenor bass is a tuning used by Stanley Clarke, Victor Wooten, and Stu Hamm.

Extended-range basses (ERBs) are basses with six to twelve strings—with the additional strings used for range rather than unison or octave pairs. A seven-string bass (B_{0}–E_{1}–A_{1}–D_{2}–G_{2}–C_{3}–F_{3}) was built by luthier Michael Tobias in 1987 for bassist Garry Goodman. Also German bass luthier Warwick built several custom fretless seven-string Thumb NT basses (F#_{0}–B_{0}–E_{1}–A_{1}–D_{2}–G_{2}–C_{3}) for Jeroen Paul Thesseling.

A piccolo bass resembles a four-stringed electric bass guitar, but usually tuned one full octave higher than a normal bass. The first piccolo bass was constructed by luthier Carl Thompson for Stanley Clarke. To allow for the raised tuning, the strings are thinner, and the length of the neck (the scale) may be shorter. Several companies manufacture "piccolo" string sets that, with a different nut, can be put on any regular bass.

== See also ==
- Bass guitar
- Extended-range bass
- Guitar tunings
- Stringed instrument tunings
