= Extended-range bass =

Electric bass guitar with more than four strings

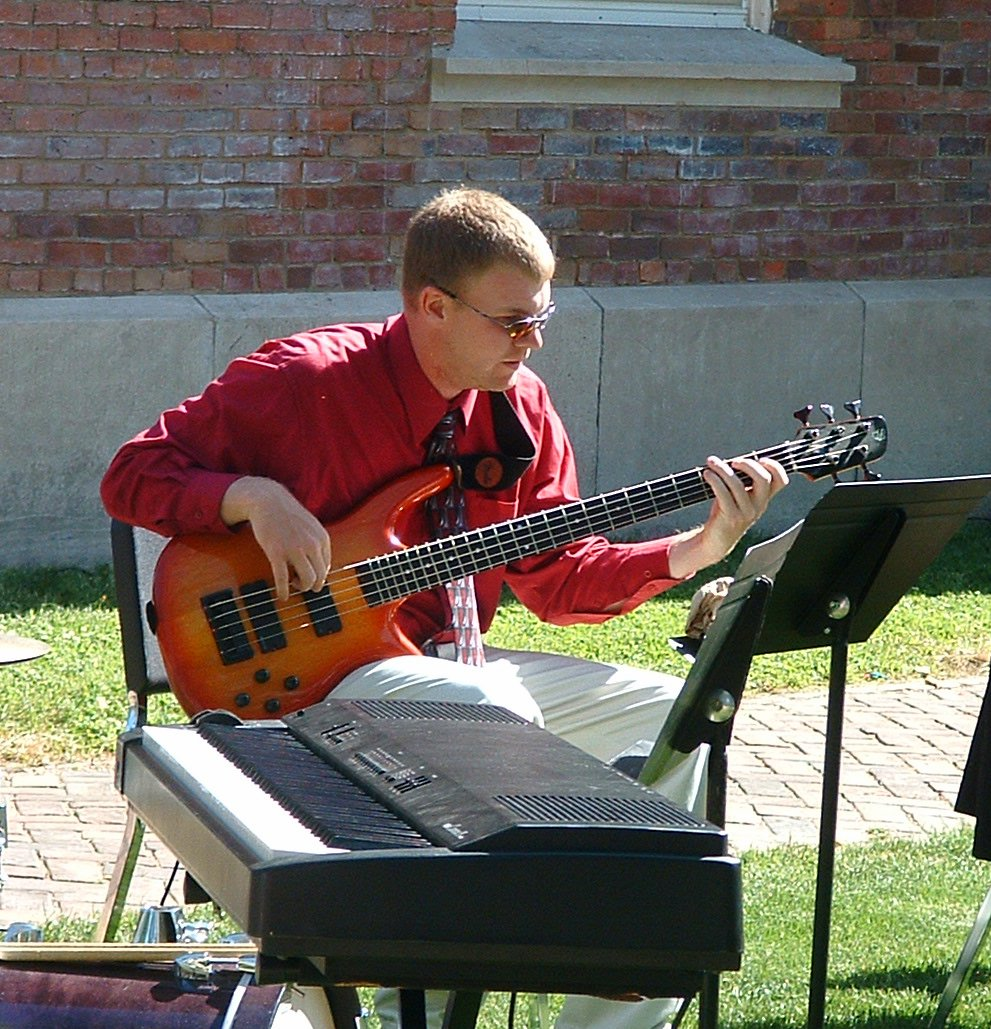
A musician playing a five-string bass, the most common type of extended-range electric bass guitar.

An extended-range bass is an electric bass guitar with a wider frequency range than a standard-tuned four-string bass guitar.

== Terminology ==
One way that a bass can be considered extended-range is to use a mechanical detuner, a special tuning machine (head) that includes a mechanical lever to allow for instant re-tuning during the live performance. When the player toggles the lever, the pitch of the string drops by a pre-set interval. A common use of detuners is to drop the low E to a low D. Detuners are more rarely used on other strings. An exception to this is Michael Manring, who plays a bass equipped with a mechanical detuner on every string, especially useful for enabling access to a wider range number of string harmonics.

Another way to get an extended range is to add strings. The most common type of bass guitar with more than four strings is the five-string bass. Five-string basses often have a low-B string, extending the instrument's lower range. Less commonly, five-string instruments add a high C-string, extending the higher range. Less commonly, the six-string bass guitar is used. Most commonly, six-string basses add a low B and a high C, extending the range on the low end and the higher register, although other tunings are used. Basses have been made with seven, eight, nine, or even fifteen strings with extremely wide necks and custom pickups. These too, are considered extended-range basses.

Michael Manring's 'Hyperbass' by Zon guitars and Les Claypool's main Carl Thompson piccolo bass are both four string basses but with necks that exceed the standard 24 frets (20 to 24 being the 'standard' for most commercially available bass guitars). Les Claypool's piccolo bass has 29 frets whereas Manring's Hyperbass is a fretless instrument (however if it were a fretted bass it too would also exceed the 24th fret).

Extended-range bass does not refer to bass guitars with double or triple courses of strings such as the eight-string bass guitar or twelve-string bass, both of which could be considered as standard four string basses but with the addition of piccolo bass strings, tuned in octaves. These strings are played in unison with the bass strings, thereby producing a natural chorus effect.

The Ibanez Ashula bass guitar, though having seven strings, would also not be considered as an extended-range bass because the first four strings - G D A (low)E - lie over a section of the fretboard that has frets whereas the last three strings - a lower G, D and A - lie over a fretless part of the same fretboard.

== History ==
In 1956, Danelectro introduced their six-string bass (tuned EADGBE, an octave below a six-string guitar). Fender brought out the Fender Bass VI in 1961, also tuned EADGBE, an octave below a regular six-string guitar. In 1965, Fender introduced the first five-string bass guitar, the Fender Bass V; however, unlike the modern 5-string, it had a high C instead of a low B. Despite this, with the total number of frets on a Bass V being fifteen, the total range of the instrument was identical to a twenty-fret four-string Fender bass.

In 1974, Anthony Jackson asked Carl Thompson to build him a six-string bass guitar tuned (from low to high) BEADGC, which he called a "contrabass guitar." Due to the close string spacing utilized to accommodate available pickups at the time, Jackson was unhappy with the instrument due to difficult playability. Carl Thompson also finished a five-string bass tuned BEADG in May 1976. And California builder Alembic delivered their first 5-string with a low B to Jimmy Johnson in 1976.

In the late 1980s, luthier Michael Tobias made the first bass with more than six single-course strings, a custom-order seven-string bass for bassist Garry Goodman, tuned BEADGCF.

In 1988, Atlanta luthier Bill Hatcher made a seven string bass tuned EADGBEA (the lowest six strings follow standard six-string-guitar intervals, EADGBE, down 1 octave, and the seventh string an added fourth above). A later tuning was BEADGBE, following standard seven-string-guitar tuning (EADGBE plus a low B). He later narrowed the neck down to convert it to a six-string instrument, tuned EADGBE.

In 1995, luthier Bill Conklin made a nine-string bass for Bill "Buddha" Dickens, and, in 1999, luthier Alfonso Iturra made an eight-string bass for Igor Saavedra. German bass luthier Warwick built several custom fretless seven-string Thumb NT basses (F#_{0}–B_{0}–E_{1}–A_{1}–D_{2}–G_{2}–C_{3}) for Jeroen Paul Thesseling. Subsequently, other luthiers built instruments with up to twelve strings, adding both lower strings (such as F# and C#) and higher strings (such as F and B♭) to the six-string bass guitar.

== Construction and tuning ==
Construction of basses with more than seven strings has largely been the realm of luthiers. Some extended-range basses are built to a player's specific preferences, including variation in scale length, appearance, and electronics. Due to the fact that the scale length of a typical bass guitar (34–35 in, 86–89 cm) produces excessive tension on the highest strings of extended-range basses, a builder may use slanted or fanned frets to achieve a variable-scale instrument.

Usually, extended-range basses are tuned in fourths. Five-string basses are normally tuned B-E-A-D-G, with a lower B string in addition to the four strings of a normal bass guitar. Some musicians such as jazz bassist Steve Swallow tune the five-string bass to E-A-D-G-C, with a high C-string instead of the low B-string.

Alternatively, tuning a standard four-string bass guitar in fifths, C-G-D-A, extends the range by six notes (four lower, two higher).

The most common tunings for a seven-string bass are F♯ to C or B to F; an eight-string F♯ to F; a nine-string F♯ to B♭; a ten-string C♯ to B♭ or F♯ to E♭; an eleven-string C♯ to E♭ or F♯ to A♭; and a twelve-string C♯ to A♭ or B to G♭.

== Playing styles ==
The techniques used to play the extended-range bass are virtually identical to those used for standard 4-string basses, including pizzicato (finger plucking), use of a plectrum (a.k.a. 'pick'), slap-and-pop, and tapping.

The upper strings of an extended-range bass allow bassists to adopt playing styles of the electric guitar. One such style is the practice of comping, or playing a rhythmic chordal accompaniment to an improvised lead. The increased polyphony of extended-range basses allows for voicings (chords, arpeggios) of five or more notes, as well as wider voicings such as "drop 3", "drop 2+4" and "spreads." Walking a bassline and comping at the same time is also possible, which is useful in jazz combos lacking a chordal instrument, or in accompaniment of a chordal instrument during their lead portion.

The added strings of the extended-range bass compound the muting problems that many bassists encounter: because of sympathetic vibration, a plucked note makes that same note (and its octaves) sound on all strings that are unmuted. Extended-range bassists often turn to soft items such as hairbands to dampen the sympathetic vibrations, or adopt advanced muting techniques, including the "floating thumb" technique (using the thumb of the plucking hand to mute lower strings) to achieve a good sound.

The role that the extended-range bass plays in music is still largely a matter of situation and personal preference. Many extended-range bassists play the bass part in bands, and may also perform in a solo setting, using advanced techniques such as two-handed tapping or chording.

== See also ==
- Sub-bass
- Seven-string guitar
- Eight-string guitar
- Eight-string bass guitar
- Nine-string guitar
- Ten-string guitar
- Chapman Stick
- Contrabass guitar
- Warr Guitar
