= Greeny (guitar) =

1959 sunburst Gibson Les Paul Standard

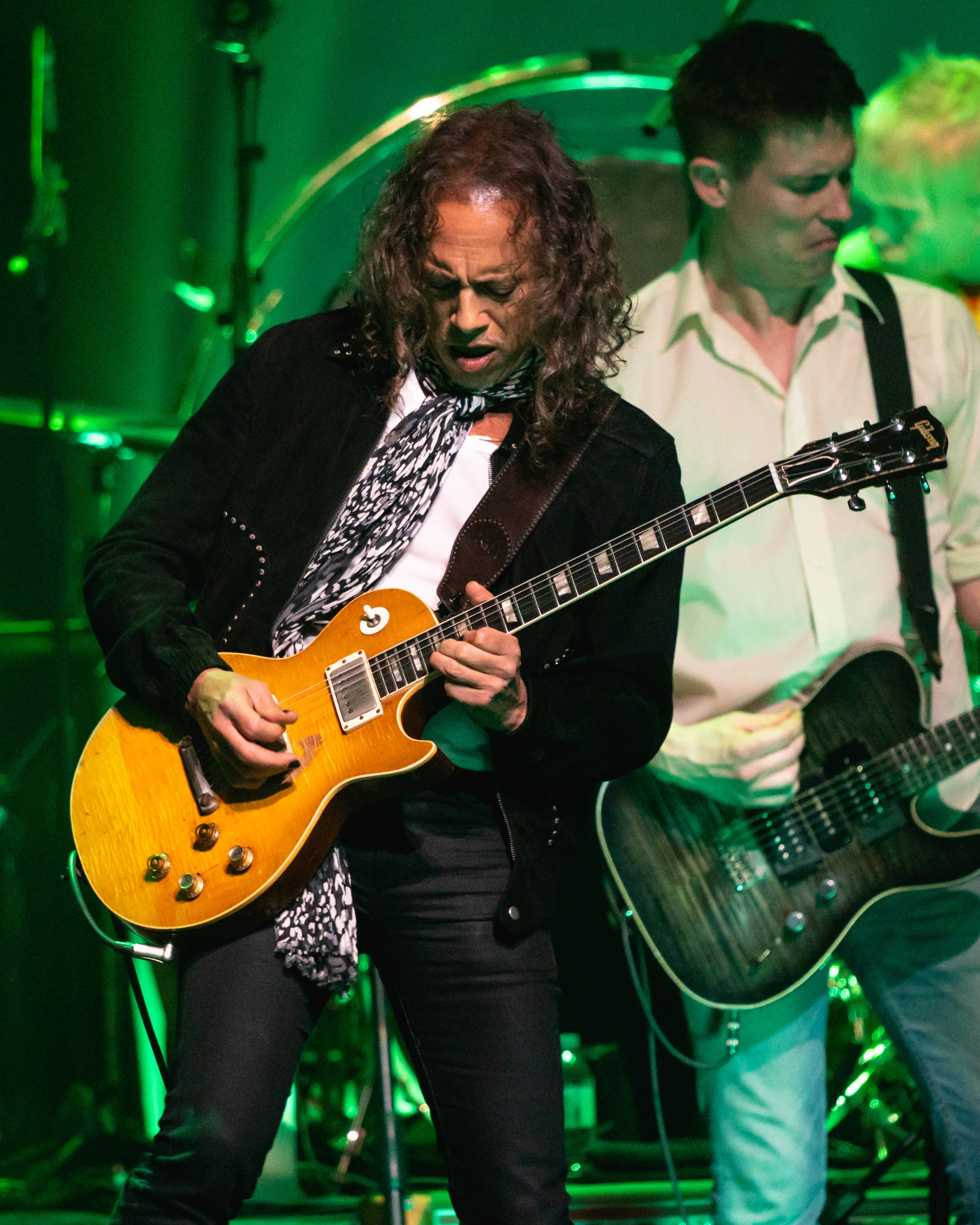
- Kirk Hammett performing with Greeny at the Peter Green tribute concert in 2020
- Manufacturer: Gibson
- Period: 1959

Construction
- Body type: Solid
- Neck joint: Set

Woods
- Body: Mahogany
- Neck: Mahogany
- Fretboard: Rosewood

Hardware
- Bridge: Tune-o-matic
- Pickup: PAF

Greeny is a 1959 Gibson Les Paul Standard, named after its first famous owner, Peter Green in 1964/5. He used it during his time in John Mayall & the Bluesbreakers and Fleetwood Mac, before selling it to Gary Moore in the early 1970s. Moore used the guitar throughout his career, both as a solo artist and in bands, such as Thin Lizzy. Due to financial troubles, he was forced to sell it in 2006, after which it passed through several private collectors and guitar dealers. In 2014, Greeny was acquired by Metallica guitarist Kirk Hammett, who has since used it both in the studio and during live performances.

The guitar is known for its unique out-of-phase tone, which is the result of a reversed magnet in the neck pickup. This sound has become highly sought-after amongst guitar players, so much so that flipping the magnet in the neck pickup has been affectionately referred to as the "Peter Green mod". The Gibson Custom Shop produced two limited runs of Greeny replicas in 2010 and 2022, respectively, before the guitar was added to Gibson's core line-up in 2023. The company also released the Gary Moore Les Paul Standard in 2013, which included many of the same features as Greeny.

== History ==
The guitar was originally owned by English musician Peter Green. He bought it for sixty guineas from the Selmer musical instrument shop in London after being asked to join John Mayall & the Bluesbreakers. Green made his recording debut with the guitar on the group's 1967 album A Hard Road. The record featured the instrumental "The Supernatural", which showcased Green's unique playing style and guitar tone. Following the album's release, Green went on to form his own group Fleetwood Mac. He released four albums with the band and used his Les Paul extensively in the studio and during live performances. Many of Fleetwood Mac's early hits were recorded with Greeny, including, "Oh Well", "Black Magic Woman", "The Green Manalishi (With the Two Prong Crown)" and "Albatross".

In January 1970, Green met Northern Irish guitarist Gary Moore, who was opening-up for Fleetwood Mac with his own group Skid Row. Moore regarded Green as one of his biggest influences, and the two soon became friends. After lending Greeny to Moore for a few days, Green asked if he wanted to buy it. Moore was initially hesitant, thinking he couldn't afford it, but Green told him to sell his main guitar and pay him whatever he got from it. Moore then sold his Gibson SG, for which he received £160, but Green refused to accept the money. Instead, Green asked the same amount he had originally paid for it, which was £120 according to Moore. In the end, Green only took £100 or £110 for the guitar. When Moore told him he could have it back anytime, Green replied: "No, I'll never ask for it back."

Moore used the guitar extensively throughout his career both as a solo artist and in other bands. Most notably, he used it on Thin Lizzy's Black Rose: A Rock Legend and his solo with Phil Lynott on "Parisienne Walkways", which is considered Moore's signature song. While he owned the guitar, Moore replaced the jack plate as well as the bottom volume and tone knobs. He also replaced the original machine heads with Sperzel tuners. In 1995, Moore released Blues for Greeny, a tribute album to Peter Green, on which he used Greeny throughout. In 2006, Moore was forced to sell the guitar due to financial troubles. He sold it to guitar dealer Phil Winfield for somewhere between $750,000 and $1.2 million. It was then put on sale by Winfield for $2 million, after which it was owned by several private collectors.

In 2014, Metallica guitarist Kirk Hammett purchased Greeny from guitar dealer Richard Henry for "less than $2 million". Henry was selling the guitar on behalf of the then owner Melvyn Franks, and Franks had consigned the guitar to Henry. It had previously been offered to Hammett's bandmate James Hetfield for an "exorbitant amount", but he declined. In 2020, Hammett stated he paid less than half a million dollars for the guitar, as Franks was facing financial issues and other problems in the United States and needed a quick sale. Hammett has since used Greeny extensively in the studio and during live performances. In 2020, he performed with the guitar at a Peter Green tribute concert hosted by Mick Fleetwood at the London Palladium. In 2026, Hammett used Greeny when performing a "doodle" cover of Thin Lizzy's "Róisín Dubh (Black Rose): A Rock Legend" at the Aviva Stadium in Dublin, a song that Gary Moore used Greeny on for the original studio recording.

== Tone ==
Greeny is known for its unique tone, which has been described as "magic" by numerous publications and other musicians. The guitar is equipped with PAF pickups. Early in his career, Green attempted to emulate Eric Clapton's tone by removing the neck pickup. Eventually it was put back in, but backwards by mistake. This gave the guitar its "distinctly nasal" out-of-phase tone when the pickup selector switch is in the middle position. Kirk Hammett described it as sounding like "a Strat through a 100-watt Marshall stack". The neck pickup also features a flipped alnico magnet, thought to be a factory error or an aftermarket modification. The guitar's neck has been broken twice, which Hammett feels has also affected its tone. Peter Green, however, felt that there was nothing particularly special about the guitar or his sound. He also stated that he didn't know what "out-of-phase" even meant.

In 1994, Gary Moore approached Hamer Guitars' Jol Dantzig about building a custom dual-humbucker guitar inspired by Greeny. While inspecting the pickups, Dantzig used a compass to measure the pickups' magnetic polarity. He discovered that the pickups were magnetically out of phase, with one magnet oriented north-to-south while the other was oriented south-to-north. According to Andy Ellis of Guitar Player magazine, magnetically generated phase shift responds to pitch changes, giving high notes a "pronounced hollow cry".

In 2021, it was discovered that Gibson Brand President Cesar Gueikian owned a Les Paul with the sequential serial number to that of Greeny. The guitar, nicknamed "Gemini", bears the serial number 9 2204, while Greeny is 9 2208. No other guitars were manufactured in between, instead the serial numbers belonged to Gibson manufactured Skylark amplifiers. It is believed by Gueikian and Hammett that the two guitars were built at the same time from the same piece of wood. While Gueikian's guitar does not have the reversed neck pickup, Hammett noted that its tone is remarkably similar to Greeny's.

Due to the guitar's unique pickup configuration, flipping the neck pickup has been referred to as "the Peter Green mod". In 2022, Monty's Guitars released the Bethnal Green humbuckers, which were modeled after the pickups in Greeny, which company head Matt Gleeson had the chance to study personally. That same year, Seymour Duncan released the Green Magic humbuckers, which were similarly inspired by the pickups in Greeny. In 2023, Gibson released the Greenybucker set, which are the pickups included in the Kirk Hammett signature Greeny line.

== Reproductions ==
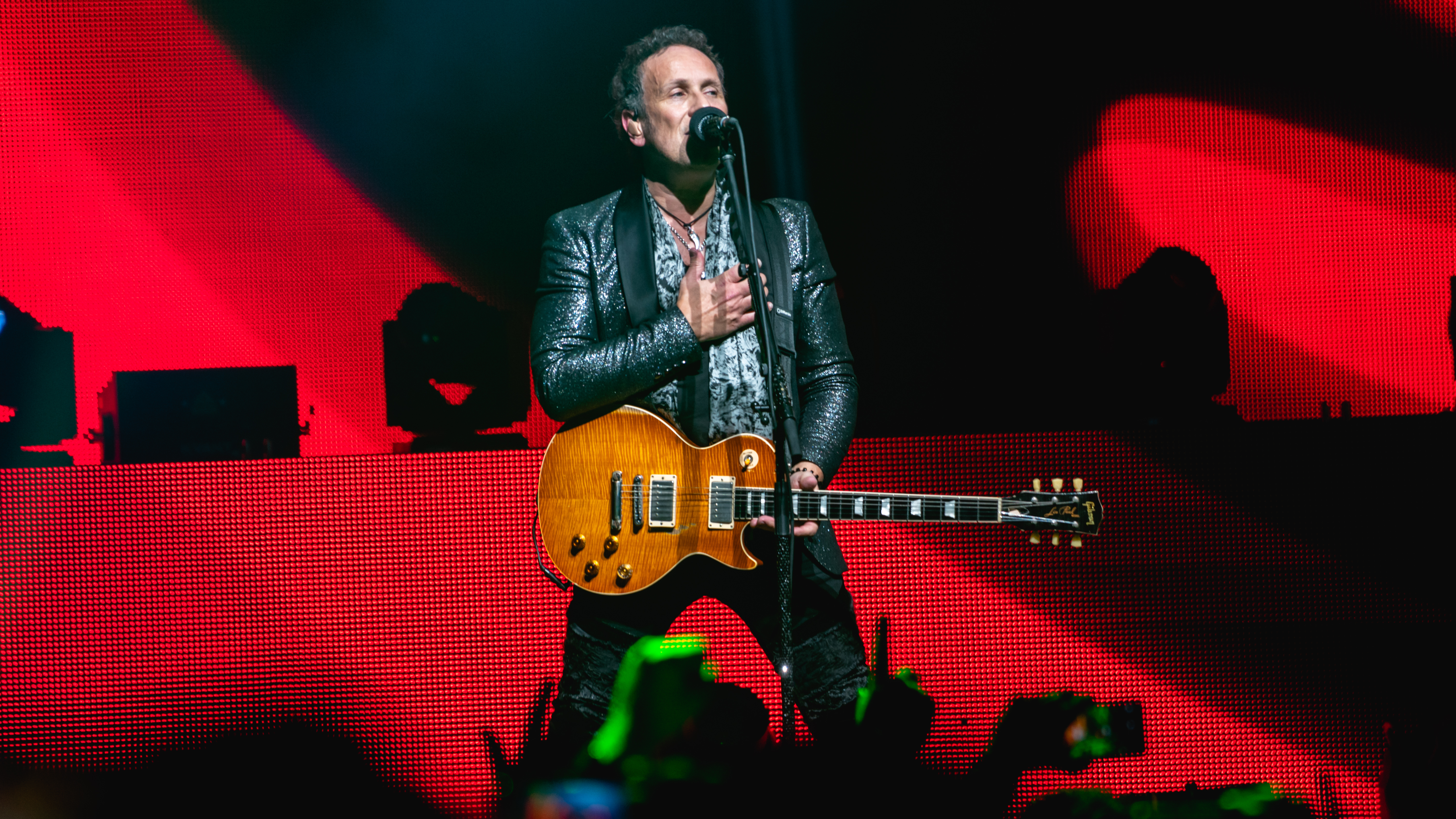
Vivian Campbell with his custom Greeny replica

In 2010, the Gibson Custom Shop launched the Collector's Choice series, which included a limited run of replicas based on Greeny. An Artist's Proof version owned by Moore was auctioned off following his death in 2011. In 2013, Gibson released the Gary Moore Les Paul Standard, which included a number of features modeled after Greeny, including a 1950s neck profile, mismatched volume and tone knobs and a mahogany body topped with a figured AA-grade maple top. Def Leppard guitarist Vivian Campbell owns a custom Greeny replica, nicknamed "Gary" after Moore.

In 2020, Gibson provided Hammett with a custom replica of Greeny. The following year, the company announced a brand partnership with Hammett, which will include a line of signature Gibson and Epiphone models. In 2022, Gibson released the Collector's Edition Kirk Hammett "Greeny" 1959 Les Paul Standard. Limited to 50 units and only available directly through Gibson, the model is an exact replica of Greeny, handcrafted by the Gibson Custom Shop with ageing by the Murphy Lab. Priced at $50,000, among those to have acquired a copy were Tool guitarist Adam Jones and actor Jason Momoa. In 2023, Gibson added two more models to the Greeny line: one by the Custom Shop, the other by Gibson USA. An Epiphone version was also released.

== See also ==
- List of guitars
- Vintage V100MRPGM Lemon Drop
