= Eight-string bass guitar =

Variation of a bass guitar with 8 strings instead of 7

An eight-string bass guitar is a type of bass guitar with double course strings normally tuned in octaves, with both strings in a course usually played simultaneously. As on a 12-string guitar, this produces a natural chorus effect due to the subtle differences in string pitch.

== 8-string bass guitars ==
The eight-string bass guitar was invented by electrical engineer and musician Eric Krackow, who had played with Al Kooper's early band, The Aristo-Cats, in the late 1950s and early 1960s. It bothered Eric that 50% of the quartet would be tied up with the guitar doubling the bass line. Eric, finding it too awkward to play the unison octaves himself on complex songs, remembered the 12-string guitar principle and made a prototype eight-string bass from a modified four-string bass. The bass was strung with paired, octaved strings, similar to those of a regular 12-string guitar.

In 1967, Eric and business partner Steve Wittels brought it to Sid Hack of Univox, the company that imported Hagström guitars. Hack liked the idea, and ordered a trial run of 500 units. The success of that test run resulted in further production and sales. From 1967 through 1969, Hagstrom made 2,249 eight-string basses.

Standard tuning is usually thus:

- high e, low E,
- high a, low A
- high d, low D
- high g, low G

Chris Squire of Yes used a Ranney 8-string bass eE-aA-aD-dG, so that notes played on the upper two courses sound as open fifths; this tuning was utilized on the album 90125. He also previously used an 8-string Rickenbacker bass in standard tuning on the title track of Yes' album Going for the One. Billy Sherwood, who took over bass duties in Yes following Squire's death, extensively uses Spector and Ibanez 8-string basses in both Yes and solo projects.

Eight-string basses are usually fretted; however, fretless basses have infrequently been made. Many well-known guitar manufacturers offer eight-string basses, including Dean Guitars, ESP Guitars, Hamer Guitars, Schecter Guitars, Washburn Guitars, Rickenbacker and Hagström. Warmoth Guitars also offers an eight-string "conversion" intended to make a standard bass body into an eight-strung instrument.

Often, the 8-string bass is played with a plectrum to have a better attack and to increase the 'ringing' of the higher-register strings, but is not essential. Funk players have used finger and slap and pop techniques with the 8-string bass (such as Victor Wooten).

Guitarist Jimi Hendrix also played 8-string bass on tracks from his Electric Ladyland album, namely "Crosstown Traffic" and "1983... (A Merman I Should Turn to Be)". Bassists who at some time have utilised the eight-string bass include Abraham Laboriel, Mark Egan, Nick Lowe, Jeff Ament of Pearl Jam, Paulo Pinto of Sepultura, John Paul Jones of Led Zeppelin, John Entwistle of The Who, Mike Rutherford of Genesis, Greg Lake of Emerson, Lake & Palmer, Gary Shea of Alcatrazz, Bent Sæther of Motorpsycho, Thom Bone of Butt Trumpet, Dennis McGarry of It's OK!, Lemmy of Motörhead, Yoshihiro Naruse of Casiopea, Baron Blood of Necromantia, Brandon Curtis of The Secret Machines, Ian Hill of Judas Priest, Benjamin Orr of The Cars, and Tom Petersson of Cheap Trick.

== 10-string bass guitars ==
10-string basses incorporate a high b and low B string (like that of a regular 5-string bass, but double-stringed).

- high b, low B
- high e, low E
- high a, low A
- high d, low D
- high g, low G

Michael Manring plays a 10-string bass made by Zon Guitars. He uses a variety of tunings, but rarely uses octaves, instead preferring thirds, fourths and fifths. John Paul Jones used a 10-string bass made by Manson guitars at Led Zeppelin's 2007 reunion concert.

== See also ==
- Extended-range bass
