= Igor Saavedra =

Chilean bass guitarist (born 1966)

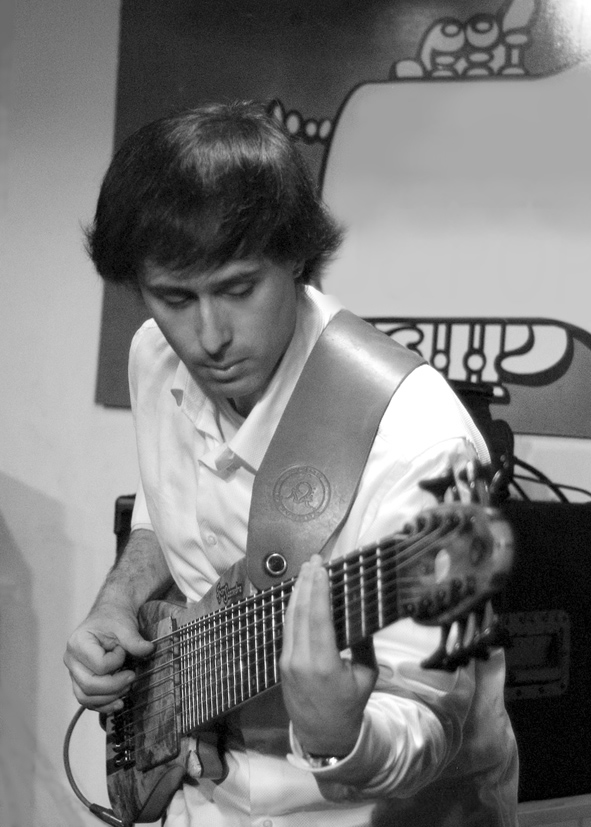
- Live in Buenos Aires. July 2010.

Background information
- Born: Igor Alexander Saavedra Valenzuela; May 31, 1966 (age 60); Santiago, Chile
- Genres: Jazz, jazz fusion, rhythm and blues, rock, funk, smooth jazz
- Occupations: Musician, bassist
- Instruments: Bass, Extended-range bass
- Years active: 1988–present
- Website: igorsaavedra.com

Igor Saavedra (Santiago de Chile, May 31, 1966 ) is a player and pioneer of the extended-range bass (ERB) guitar. As of 1999, he has dedicated his musical career to the study and performing of the eight string extended-range bass guitar and is considered a pioneer on that field by the world's most prestigious bass publications. As collected from many interviews worldwide, Saavedra was the first ERB player in South America and is also credited as being the creator of the Mic Ramp in 1995, which is a height adjustable wooden ramp that contains the bass pickups which are derived from the Willi's Ramp. At the same time, in 1993, he started developing a technique for the electric bass named Vectorial Synthesis Technique, about which he's been writing a book.

== Early life ==
In 1988, at 22 years old, Igor Saavedra was a Kung Fu instructor with almost ten years of experience who was preparing to move to China to continue with his Martial Arts studies. He had not seen music as being a part of his life at that point. He was also in 4th year at the university, studying to become a physical education teacher until the day he assisted with a Jazz concert at the University Campus that made him realize he was a musician and specifically that he wanted to dedicate his life to the performing of the Electric Bass.

== Highlights ==
As of 2013, Saavedra has been featured, interviewed, and published in more than seventy specialized magazine editions worldwide. He has also been cover featured on issue 7 of the European magazine Bajos y Bajistas, on issue 12 of the Brazilian Magazine Linha de Frente. and the August 2013 6th Anniversary Special Edition of the American Magazine Bass Musician Magazine.

In 1997, Saavedra was the first bass player in the world to record the full original version of "The Flight of the Bumblebee" with no pick and at the real speed. Saavedra was also the head teacher of the Bass department at California Music Studio in Los Angeles, USA for four years.

After touring in South America with expert keyboardist David Garfield in the year 2011, and due to his special recommendation to Chris Jisi, Saavedra was formally invited to perform a master class and to be part of the All-Star Jam at the prestigious Bass Player Live 2011, along with bass experts such as Marcus Miller, Anthony Jackson, Darryl Jones, Abraham Laboriel, Larry Graham, Brian Bromberg, Verdine White and Lee Sklar. Because of that, Saavedra was specially featured on Latin American CNN. A following October 2011 issue of Bass Player Magazine called his BPL performance, "A fascinating Solo Seminar by South American 8 String Bassist Igor Saavedra".

In 2012, he was officially invited for second time in a row to be one of the guests at the Bass Player Live 2012 along with bass legends like Gary Grainger, Chris Squire, Hadrien Feraud, Dave Ellefson, and Robert Trujillo. He again was invited to join the All-Star Jam. In March 2013, Saavedra was one of the 10 featured artists at The London Bass Guitar Show along with Pink Floyd's Guy Prat and Stevie Wonder's Nate Watts.

He has performed many concerts and Master Classes in several countries and places such as these: University of British Columbia at The Cush in Kelowna, Canada; Long & McQuade in Vancouver, Canada; Bass Player Live 2011 at NAMM Show 2000, 2001, 2004 and 2012 in Los Angeles, USA; Musikmesse 2012 in Frankfurt, Germany; Master Class at The New York Bass Collective 2013 in New York City; Master Class at Todobajos in concert at El Barco in Madrid, Spain; jazz and pop concert at EMBA in Buenos Aires, Argentina; in concert at AECID Theater in Zerú Club, Zeppelín Club, and Central Square in Santa Cruz de la Sierra, Bolivia; Master Class at Franco Boliviano in La Paz, Bolivia; in concert and Master Class in Cochabamba, Bolivia; in concert at Cavas Club in Posadas, Argentina; in concert at the Central Square in Ciudad del Este, Paraguay; in concert at the Central Square in Villarrica, Paraguay; in concert at the Central Square in Encarnación, Paraguay.

== Collaborators ==
- David Garfield – Keyboardist for George Benson, Freddie Hubbard, Cher, Michael Bolton, Manhattan Transfer
- Bob Sheppard – Saxophonist for Chick Corea, Mike Stern and Tribal Tech
- Danny Gottlieb – Drummer for Pat Metheny and Mahavishnu Orchestra
- James Gadson – Drummer for Quincy Jones, Herbie Hancock, Albert King and B. B. King
- Damien Schmitt – Drummer for Jean-Luc Ponty
- Miucha Buarque – Singer for Antonio Carlos Jobim, Joao Gilberto, Vinicius de Moraes, Toquinho
- Hanz Zermuhlen – Keyboardist for Air Supply and Frank Gambale
- Jonas Hellborg – Bassist for John McLaughlin
- Lee Sklar – Bassist for Phil Collins
- Gary Grainger – Bassist for John Scofield
- Fareed Haque Quartet – Guitarist for Sting, Garaj Mahal, Paquito D'Rivera and Arturo Sandoval
- Walfredo Reyes, Jr. – Drummer for Christina Aguilera, Carlos Santana, and now Chicago
- Tom McMorran – Keyboardist for Tom Scott, The Rippingtons and Robben Ford
- Ramón Stagnaro – Guitarist for Hossana, Alejandro Sanz, and Abraham Laboriel
- Jim Paxson – Drummer for Robben Ford, Stanley Clarke and Alanis Morissette
- Óscar Giunta – Drummer for Luis Salinas and Javier Malosetti
- Jan Fabricky – Drummer for Marc Antoine and Andre Manga
- Jean Marc Belkady – Guitar professor at Musicians Institute
- Antti Kotikosky – Guitarist for Vinnie Colaiuta
- Marcelo Berestovoy – Guitarist for Ricky Martin, Selena, Daniela Romo, Bebu Silvetti, guitar professor at Musicians Institute
- Robert Incelli – Saxophonist for Oscar D'León, and Otmaro Ruíz

== Equipment ==
Igor Saavedra uses exclusively Ramsay Basses, Phil Jones Amplifiers, La Bella Strings, Analysis Plus Cables, Wittner Metronomes, Nordstrand Pickups and Mey Chair Systems.

== Discography ==
=== Solo ===
- Igor Saavedra – The Flight of the Bumblebee (Independent – USA 1997)
- Igor Saavedra – Organic Bass 1 (Independent – Germany 2015)

=== Session musician ===
- De Kiruza – Presentes (Alerce – Chile 1991)
- Juan Coderch – Repercusión (Independent – Chile 1993)
- Al Este – Del Cielo está el Paraíso (Polygram Latino, Polydor – Chile y USA 1995)
- Francisco Cortez – Mentiras por Amor (DA Records – USA 1997)
- Brazza – Mapule (DA Records – USA 1998)
- Juan Coderch – CD Compilado (Independent – Chile 1999)
- Lorena Taibo – Mitología Privada (Warner Music Argentina 2001)
- Lorena Taibo – Single Huellas en el Mar (Warner Music Argentina 2001)
- Grupo de Percusión Sinfónica de la Universidad Católica – Música Chilena (Independent – Chile 2002)
- Emilio García – Ultrablues (Petroglyph USA – Chile 2005)
- Ricardo Arancibia – One Day (Independent – Chile 2005)
- Pedro Cruz – Los Amigos de mi Voz (Independent – Argentina 2011)
- Mauricio Pareja – Energía Vital (Independent – Bolivia 2012)

=== Educator ===
- CDs along with the Jam Session section included in Bajista Magazine, issues 18 to 29. (Ares Editorial – Spain 2006, 2007)
- CD included with his book Rítmica Aplicada al Bajo Eléctrico Vol.1 (JC Sáez Editores – Chile 2008)

== Books ==
Igor Saavedra is the author of a three-book series for bass written in the Spanish language (by JC Sáez publishing), which is dedicated to rhythm, technique, harmony, and improvisation all specifically written for the electric bass. The first book named Applied Rhythmic for the Electric Bass, Vol. 1 (ISBN 978-956-306-023-2) was released in 2006, and the following ones Applied Technique for the Electric Bass, Vol. 2 and Harmony and Improvisation for the Electric Bass, Vol. 3 are yet to be released.
