= Contrabass guitar =

Very low pitched instrument of the guitar family

String instrument
- Other names: Octave guitar
- Classification: String instrument (fingered or picked; strummed)
- Hornbostel–Sachs classification: 321.322 (Composite chordophone)

Related instruments
- Electric guitar; Double bass; Acoustic bass guitar; Ukulele bass

A contrabass guitar is a low-register bass guitar, typically with six strings. It is often called, simply, a six-string bass guitar. The five-string bass guitar is rarely called a contrabass guitar, even though it typically has the same lowest note.

== History ==
Contrabass guitars have been around since 1899, when a "Grand Concert Contra Bass Guitar" was listed in Joseph Bohmann's catalogue. Bohmann, a violin, mandolin, guitar and zither manufacturer from Chicago, developed a large 6-string guitar. While some logically speculate that this instrument was tuned one octave lower than a standard guitar (basically an Acoustic Bass VI), no reliable information is available about its tuning.

A "classical contrabass guitar" (a.k.a. Acoustic Bass VI) is tuned E_{1}–A_{1}–D_{2}–G_{2}–B_{2}–E_{3}, like the classical guitar, but one octave lower. It is popular in Fado bands in Portugal and South America. In this sense, it may actually be considered as an acoustic bass guitar, for it shares the same low-end range. Although called a contrabass guitar, the fact that it is tuned only an octave lower than a normal guitar makes it—in modern terminology—more an acoustic bass guitar than a contrabass instrument. Its strings are much thinner than a conventional acoustic bass guitar, so it lacks the "thick" tone of those instruments.

Contrabass guitars from the 1970s are often tuned B_{0}–E_{1}–A_{1}–D_{2}–G_{2}–C_{3} (B_{0} being the lowest B on a standard 88-key piano). Some players prefer B_{0}–E_{1}–A_{1}–D_{2}–F♯_{2}–B_{2}, which preserves the intervals of a standard guitar tuning (lowered by a twelfth) and makes the top and bottom notes the same pitch. They are usually electric instruments with a solid wooden body. After guitar maker Carl Thompson made a first, arguably non-satisfying attempt to create such an instrument in 1974, Ken Smith built the first entirely usable electric contrabass guitar in 1982. This was again at the request of bassist Anthony Jackson, who later asked Vinnie Fodera and Joey Lauricella of Fodera Guitars to build several instruments according to his ideas.

== See also ==
- Extended-range bass
- Fender Bass VI
