= Twelve-string bass =

Bass guitar with 12 strings instead of the usual 4 or 6 strings

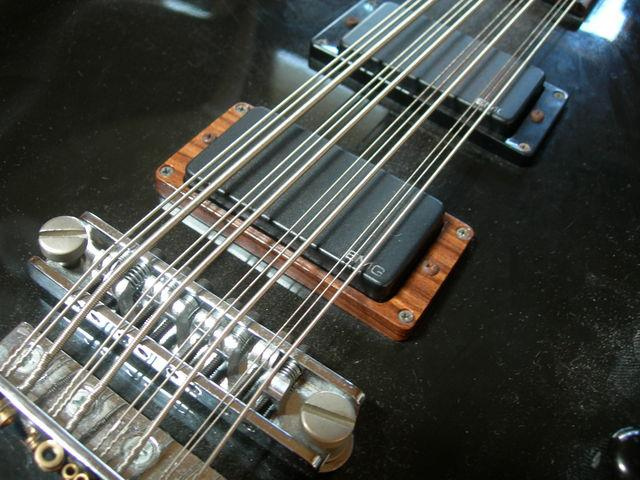
HAMER B12S

The twelve-string bass is an electric bass with four courses of three strings each, though they occasionally have six courses of two strings.

Normal tuning is eeE-aaA-ddD-ggG, with one string of each course tuned the same as the corresponding string of the four-string bass, and the remaining two strings tuned to the octave.

The first known 12-string bass guitar, the "Hamer Quad," was designed by Jol Dantzig and built in 1977 for Tom Petersson by Hamer Guitars. Petersson's Cheap Trick bandmate Rick Nielsen reports that Petersson first conceived of the instrument in 1973, and worked with Hamer over the next few years refining the design.

== Notable players ==
- Tom Petersson of Cheap Trick. Gretsch unveiled the white USA Custom Shop Tom Petersson Signature 12-String Falcon Bass in 2016, followed by the "relic"-finish G6136B-TP12
- Jeff Ament of Pearl Jam. His 12-string bass playing can be heard in the song "Jeremy"
- Allen Woody of The Allman Brothers Band, Gov’t Mule and Blue Floyd
- Doug Pinnick of King's X
- Chip Z'nuff of Enuff Z'nuff
- Clint Bahr of TriPod
- Les Fradkin
- John Gallagher of Raven

== Manufacturers ==
- Hamer Guitars
- Dean Guitars
- Gretsch
- Waterstone Guitars
- Musicvox
- Schecter Guitar Research

== Other bass guitars with 12 strings ==
Basses with 12 strings and different layouts have been built.

A bass with six two-string courses (bB-eE-aA-dD-gG-cC) was played by John Paul Jones of Led Zeppelin.

== See also ==
- Eight-string bass guitar
- Mandocello
- Chapman Stick
