= Piccolo bass =

Bass tuned to a higher frequency

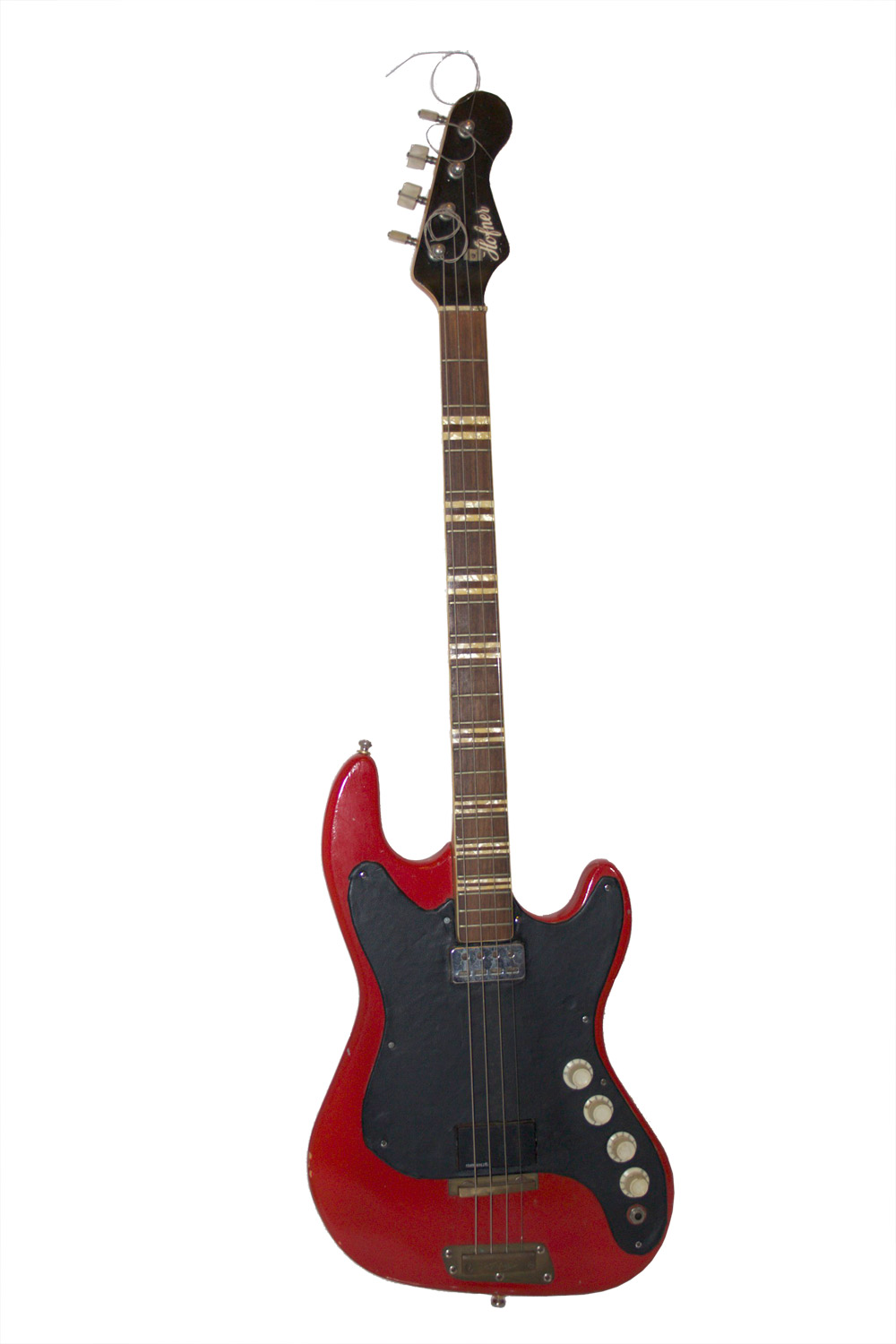
- A 1963 Hofner Model 185 bass converted to piccolo tuning

String instrument
- Classification: String instrument (bowed, fingered, picked, tapped and occasionally strummed)
- Hornbostel–Sachs classification: 321.322 (Composite chordophone)
- Inventor(s): Ron Carter, Stanley Clarke
- Developed: 1970s

Playing range
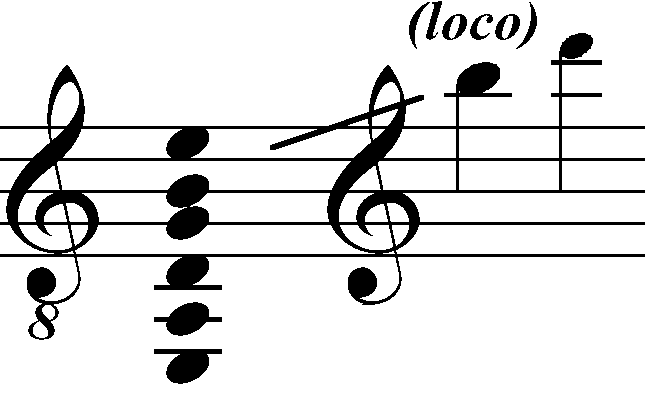
- (a standard tuned four-string piccolo bass guitar)

Related instruments
- Electric guitar; Double bass; Acoustic bass guitar

A piccolo bass is either an electric bass or acoustic double bass which has been tuned to a higher frequency, usually one octave higher than conventional bass tuning. This allows bass players to use higher registers during soloing while retaining a familiar scale length and string spacing.

== History ==
In the early 1970s, Ron Carter and Stanley Clarke were independently exploring the possibilities of stringing their instruments in a higher, or piccolo, tuning. Clarke's idea for piccolo bass originally came from luthier Carl Thompson. The earliest recording of Carter playing piccolo bass is on the 1973 album Blues Farm.

== Design considerations ==
=== Acoustic piccolo bass ===
The acoustic piccolo bass is constructed in the same way as a double bass, allowing the player to use the same arco and pizzicato techniques. The scale length will usually be similar to that of a standard 1/4, 1/2, 5/8, or 3/4 size upright bass, with thinner strings to allow a higher-pitched tuning. The acoustic piccolo bass is usually tuned in fourths, E2-A2-D3-G3, although Ron Carter often uses A1-D2-G2-C3.

=== Electric piccolo bass ===
The electric piccolo bass is generally constructed in the same way as an electric bass guitar. In many cases, these are conventional bass guitars which have been converted to piccolo tuning. This typically requires a new nut to accept the thinner strings. The tuning is E2-A2-D3-G3, which is the same as the lower four strings on a guitar. Some short-scale piccolo basses may be strung with conventional guitar strings. However, in general a piccolo bass will require special string sets to cater for the longer scale length, and larger ball ends to cope with the larger drilled holes in a bass bridge.

The tuning varies with the personal tastes of the artist, as does the number of strings. Joey DeMaio from the heavy metal band Manowar plays with four strings on his piccolo bass. Jazz bassist John Patitucci used a six-string piccolo bass, unaccompanied, on his song "Sachi's Eyes" on his album One More Angel. Michael Manring uses D'Addario EXL 280 piccolo bass strings, in a variety of tunings, on his four-string Hyperbass, made by Zon Guitars.

== Notable players ==
- Lisle Atkinson
- Les Claypool
- Chris Squire
- Joey DeMaio
- Brian Bromberg
- Ron Carter
- Stanley Clarke
- Dwayne Dolphin
- Mariusz Duda
- Sam Jones
- Michael Manring
- Joe "Foley" McCreary
- Charnett Moffett
- Jackie Orszaczky
- John Patitucci
- Oscar Pettiford
- Jeff Schmidt
- Lee Sklar
- Wayman Tisdale
