= Carl Thompson (luthier) =

American luthier & musician (born 1939)

Carl Thompson (born February 5, 1939) is a luthier and musician specializing in the construction of high-quality custom bass guitars. He is based in Brooklyn, New York.

Born in Pitcairn, Pennsylvania, to a large musical family, by age 19 Thompson was touring and playing guitar with Billy Ward and his Dominoes. Interrupted by the draft, Thompson then served as Assistant Musical Director in the U.S. Army, traveling the world and entertaining troops. Once discharged, Thompson moved to New York City in 1967 to pursue a career as a jazz guitarist. After working in Dan Armstrong's guitar repair shop to supplement his income, he started his own guitar repair business. He made his first instrument in 1974.

Carl Thompson has invented several important designs for modern basses. The most important advances in design attributed to Carl are his invention of Neck-thru instruments using a single piece heel block, as well as lengthening the electric bass from a 34" scale to a 36" and 38", which extends the harmonic overtones producing a richer timbre that is more consistent with the traditional acoustic bass. The piccolo bass, a guitar of the same dimensions as a normal bass but tuned an octave higher, was envisioned by Stanley Clarke and first built for him by Carl. Carl also constructed the first six string contrabass guitar envisioned by Anthony Jackson.

Carl's most popular endorsee is Les Claypool of the band Primus, who plays and owns seven Carl Thompson basses, his most famous being the Rainbow Bass, a six-string fretless bass made of several different woods. He has made at least two basses for Stanley Clarke. Clarke honored Thompson at one of his concerts and invited him on stage, calling him "a very great bass maker" and stating "(Carl) made one of my first piccolo basses. In fact, he made the first piccolo bass." Carl has also built guitars for Lou Reed, Hank Williams III and Jason Momoa.

Thompson basses are sought after, and he maintains a two-year waiting list, though some orders can take well over three years to complete. The cost for a basic four-string bass made by Thompson is about $5,500. Basses such as the "Rainbow Bass" can cost well over $10,000, although Carl will not make copies of the bass for his clients despite being asked to do so in the past. He maintains that all his basses are one-of-a-kind.

Thompson continues to be an active musician, practicing several hours a day, and performing once a week at a local Brooklyn restaurant. He has a fascination with jazz singers, and is a respected vocal coach of young singers.
