= Hamer Guitars =

Electric guitar manufacturer

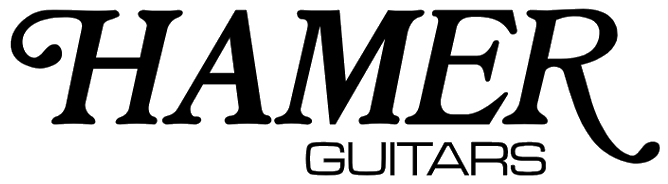

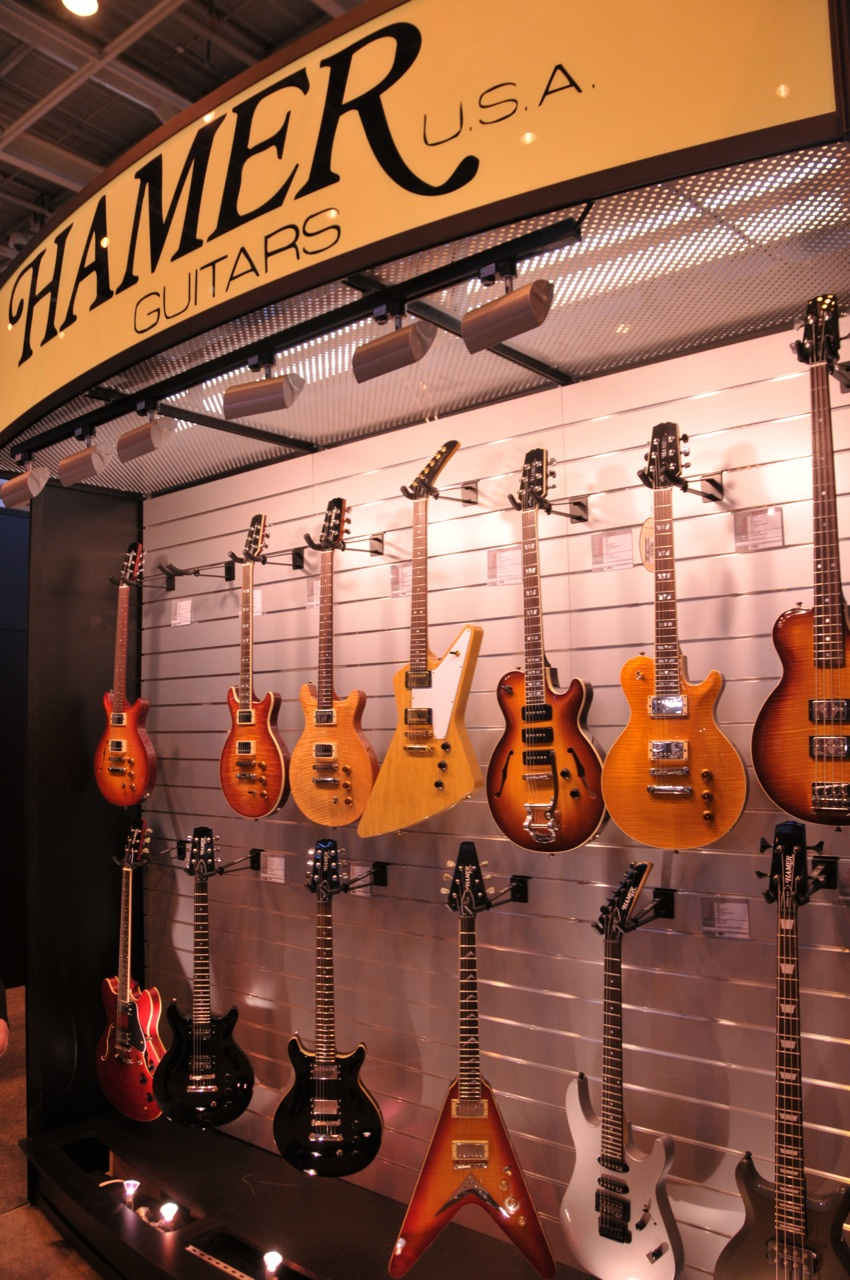
- Hamer Guitars on display at a music exhibition, 2008
- Type: Private
- Industry: Musical instruments
- Founded: 1973; 53 years ago
- Headquarters: Arlington Heights, Illinois
- Area served: Worldwide
- Key people: Paul Hamer, Jol Dantzig and John Montgomery
- Products: Electric guitars
- Parent: KMC Music
- Website: hamerguitars.com

Hamer Guitars (/ˈheɪmər/ HAY-mər) was an American electric guitar manufacturer founded in 1973, in Wilmette, Illinois, by vintage guitar shop owners Paul Hamer and Jol Dantzig. The company's early instruments featured guitar designs based on the Gibson Explorer (The Standard) and Gibson Flying V (Vector), before adding more traditional Gibson-inspired designs such as the Sunburst. Hamer Guitars is generally considered the first "boutique" vintage-style electric guitar brand that specifically catered to professional musicians, and was the first guitar manufacturer to produce a 12 string bass guitar.

The company was incorporated in Illinois in 1976 by John Montgomery, Jol Dantzig, James Walker and Hamer. It was acquired by Kaman Music Corporation in 1988, which was purchased in turn by Fender Musical Instruments Corporation in 2008. Hamer offered a wide array of electric guitars and electric basses and since its foundation, placed an emphasis on producing high-quality instruments with vintage aesthetics as well as creative innovations.

Kaman marketed a lower-priced line of Asian-built instruments called the Hamer XT Series and Slammer by Hamer, which was discontinued in 2009.

After a 4-year hiatus since Fender had discontinued the Hamer models in 2013, the brand was re-introduced as a subsidiary of KMC Music, which announced the return of imported-only Hamer Guitars at the NAMM Show that same year.

== History ==
The first Hamer guitar, a Flying V bass, was built at Northern Prairie Music, a vintage instrument shop in Wilmette, Illinois, owned by Hamer and Dantzig. The shop catered to musicians who were interested in high-quality instruments. This first instrument served as the basis for a new company called Hamer Guitars.

Hamer began publicizing its instruments in 1974, with small black-and-white ads in guitar magazines. Hamer Guitars Inc. was incorporated in Illinois in 1976 by John Montgomery, Jol Dantzig, Paul Hamer and James Walker. In 1977 the company borrowed $10k from Paul Hamer's father, set up shop in Palatine, Illinois and employed seven workers. At this time the woodworking was being subcontracted to the Tom Holmes Company in Nashville, Tennessee, with the painting and setup (stringing) being done in the Palatine shop. Prior to that point production had been one-off custom variations on the original "Standard" and "Flying V" guitars built by either John Montgomery or Jim Beach. The new arrangement with Holmes allowed Hamer to broaden its offering by building a more mainstream instrument called the "Sunburst." Before this expansion Hamer's customers were limited to big-name touring groups such as Kiss, Bad Company, Wishbone Ash, Jethro Tull and Savoy Brown. In the late 1970s to the mid-1980s Def Leppard used Hamer guitars and basses.

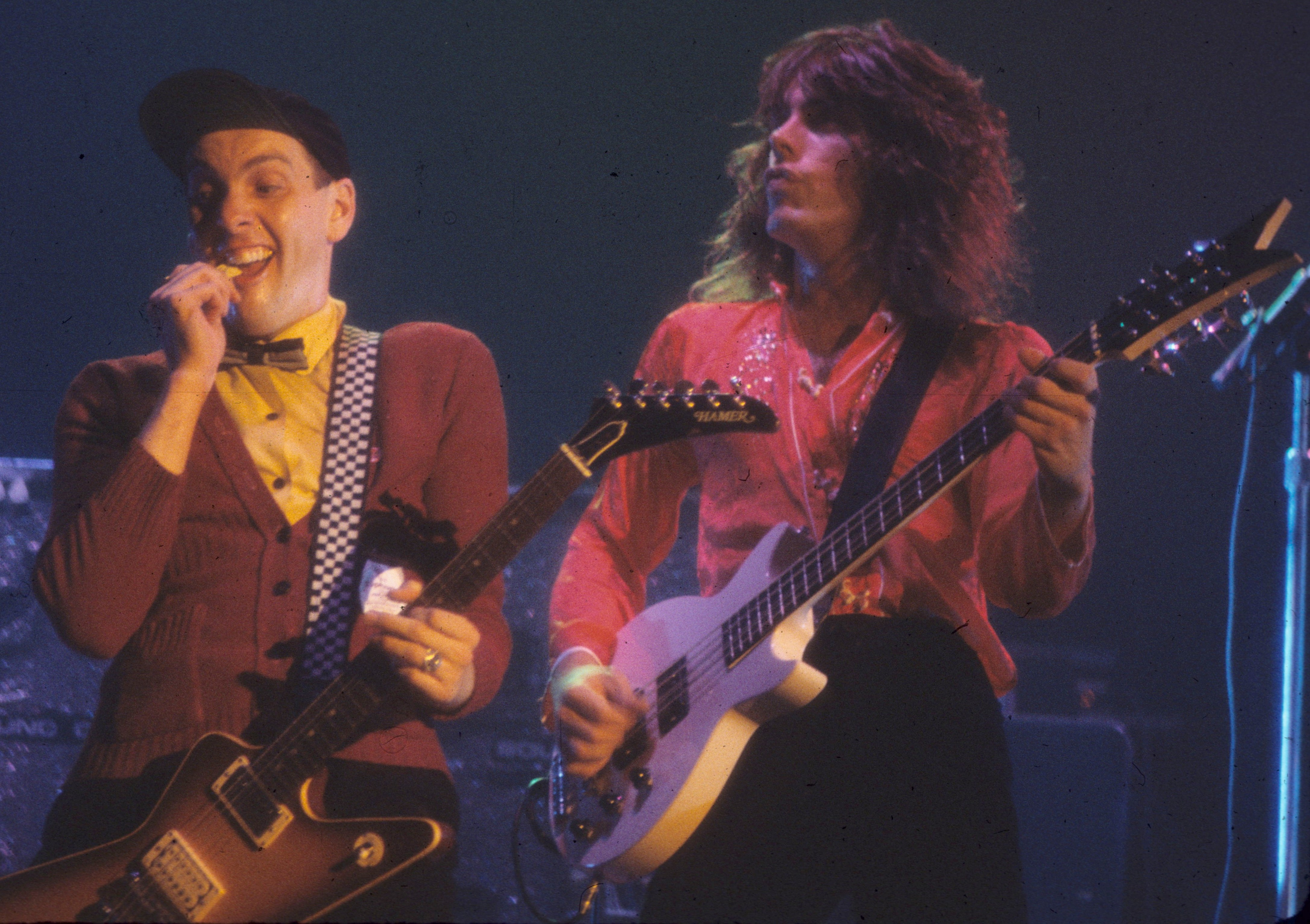
Cheap Trick on stage in 1977 with their Hamer instruments: Rick Nielsen (left) with a standard model and Tom Petersson with a 10-string bass

To appeal to a broader market, Hamer introduced its first production guitar, the Sunburst, 1977. Production was reportedly around 10 guitars per week. During that time, the company gained more popularity due to the high-profile patronage of Cheap Trick guitarist Rick Nielsen and that group's use of Hamer eight- and 12-string basses. In 1978, Frank Untermyer joined the company as part of Hamer's attempt to expand its business worldwide. Untermyer served as a partner and international sales manager.

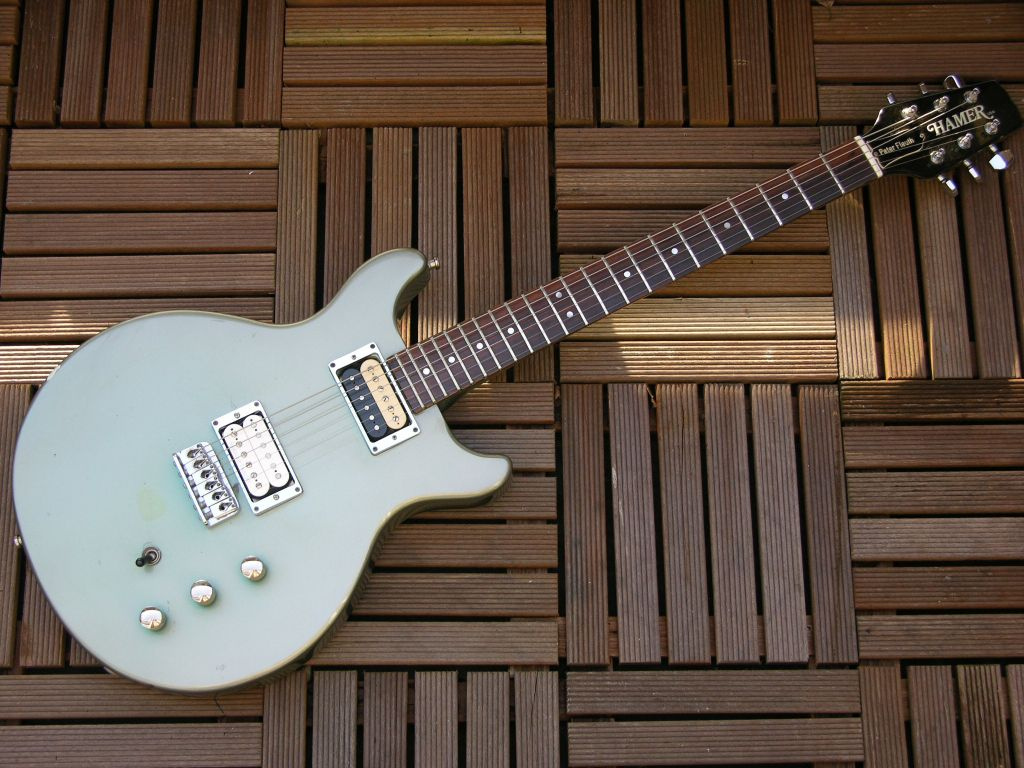
A 1980 "Special" model

In 1980, Hamer moved to larger quarters in Arlington Heights, a suburb of Chicago. It was at this point that all manufacturing processes were brought in-house, with Dantzig overseeing manufacturing and design. The staff had grown to 12 and Hamer Guitars continued to launch new models, such as the "Special", "Cruisebass", "Prototype", "Blitz" and "Phantom". Paul Hamer, the company's president, and chief salesperson, left in 1987 to pursue a career in retail. Kaman Music was then approached to handle sales, while the remaining owners concentrated on manufacturing. Kaman Music agreed to purchase Hamer in late 1988.

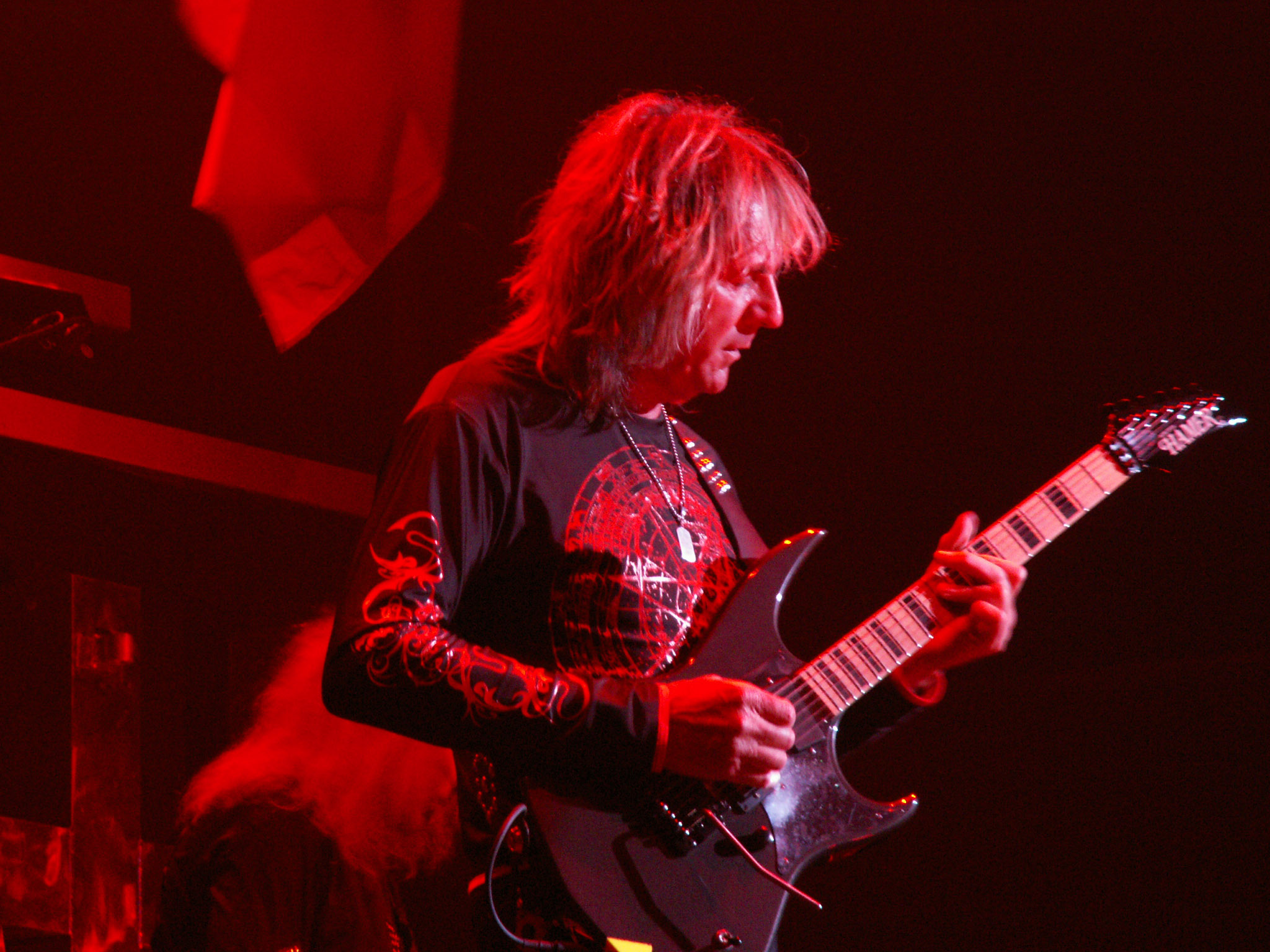
Glenn Tipton of Judas Priest playing a Hamer Phantom GT

From this era stems the appearance of Hamer models for heavy metal pioneers Judas Priest. Glenn Tipton's designed and used two very iconic Hamer guitars: the non-production Hamer GT Custom, introduced in 1986, and the Hamer Phantom GT. Especially designed by Tipton, the GT Custom has a unique design, loosely based on a classic asymmetric V design but optimised for balance, sporting either Seymour Duncan and EMG pickups. The Phantom GT followed the more traditional design of a superstrat double cutaway guitar, equipped with EMG pickups. Both guitars are still used by Tipton on stage as of 2020.

After five years with Kaman, Dantzig left the company in 1993, moving to California to begin a design and consulting business.

In 1997, Kaman Music relocated Hamer to a smaller shop in New Hartford, Connecticut, home of Ovation Guitars. Ten of the 42 employees were relocated to New Hartford along with Dantzig, who served as technical director. Untermyer had the dual role of general manager of both Hamer and Ovation. Hamer then began concentrating on a core of high-quality designs targeted at the high-end and collector market. Brand Manager Frank Rindone assumed all marketing, advertising and sales responsibilities. Along with its parent company Kaman Music, Hamer was acquired by guitar giant Fender Musical Instruments on December 31, 2007.

Hamer lives in Chicago, where he operates a retail framing business. Dantzig left Fender in 2010 to build instruments under the Jol Dantzig Guitar Design name. Untermyer left the company in 2012 and now oversees the global supply chain of guitar manufacturer C. F. Martin & Company.

In December 2012, Fender announced that Hamer would no longer produce guitars and the company would cease to operate.

As of January 25, 2017, KMC Music announced at NAMM 2017 the re-introduction of imported Hamer Guitars with five models.
