= Zon Guitars =

American guitar manufacturer

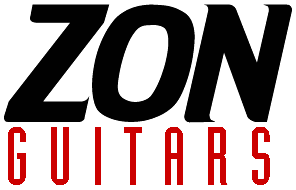
- Type: Private
- Industry: Musical instruments
- Founded: 1981; 45 years ago in Buffalo, New York
- Founder: Joseph Zon
- Headquarters: Redwood City, California, United States
- Area served: Worldwide
- Products: Bass guitars
- Website: zonguitars.com

Zon Guitars is an American manufacturer of bass guitars founded in 1981 by Joseph Zon. The company is known for its use of non-traditional designs and materials. Zon Guitars is associated with endorser and player Michael Manring, who collaborated with the company in the mid-1990s to design the innovative Zon Hyperbass instrument, a bass guitar that enables the player to retune the instrument during play.

== Instrument range ==
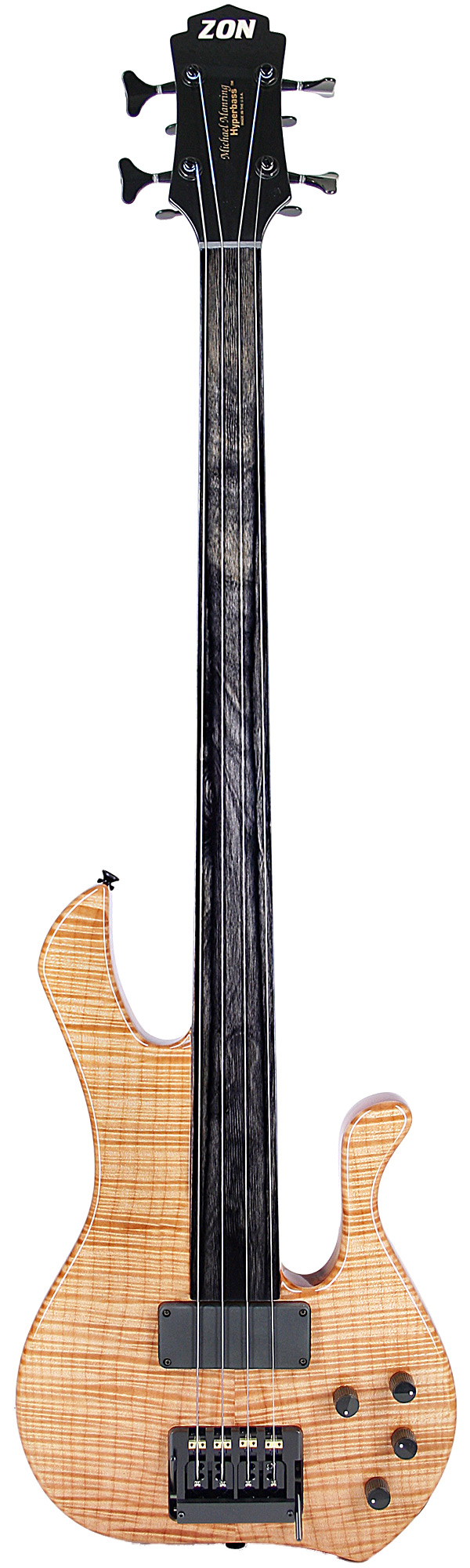
Hyperbass model

There are five primary models of Zon Bass guitars: the Mosaic series, the Sonus series, the Legacy Elite, the VB and the Hyperbass. Many models are available in a variety of configurations such as five or six-string models or models with custom electronics or woods. A signature feature of the Zon basses is the use of Phenowood instead of wood as the material for the fingerboard, laid on top of a neck made of wood composite. Phenowood is wood, often birch, that has been impregnated with a phenolic resin, layered and compressed under heat. The necks of Zon guitars that use these rigid materials usually do not have truss rods, since they are not subject to bowing. String height is adjusted from the bridge. The tone generated by these materials is clear and bell-like, and players such as Manring use these qualities to incorporate harmonics prominently in their playing.

The Hyperbass is a fretless four-string model which has a radical body shape featuring an extended cutaway to give access to a three-octave fretless fingerboard. The biggest departure from traditional construction is the use of four detuning heads (usually basses have at most one) and a unique bridge design, which allows selective tuning changes of one or more strings. This design allows quick changes to a vast selection of altered tunings. The design also incorporates four separate transducers mounted in various locations on the instrument and uses a special output connector to allow access to these individual signals in addition to the signal from the magnetic pickup.

Zon is also known as the first manufacturer to offer an optical pickup system from Lightwave Systems as a standard option on its basses. Zon had elements of their graphite necks made by Modulus Guitars until Modulus' patent for Graphite neck construction ran out in the early 1990s.

== Custom Made Basses ==
Zon has made numerous one-off custom bass guitars over the years for many popular bass guitar players. The list includes the following musicians:

- Arion Salazar (Third Eye Blind): Used from at least 1999 until his split with the band, Arion's custom Zon was notable for its built in blue LED lights in the neck of the bass.
- Tim Butler (The Psychedelic Furs): Timothy's custom bass guitar was used during the height of The Psychedelic Furs stardom from 1984 - 1987. Featuring a candy apple red paint and signature green airplane icon, this Zon bass also featured a yellow star with the name ¨Tim¨ in it. The bass was also built with a wireless system.
- In addition to his standard range Zon instruments (which include a VB4, a Legacy Elite 6-string fretless and a Legacy Elite Special fretless) Michael Manring plays several custom Zon basses - the original Hyperbass prototype, a custom Sonus/Hyperbass hybrid and a prototype Legacy 5-string which is strung with a double course, making it a 10-string).

== Notable users ==
Artist who play/have played Zon basses are:

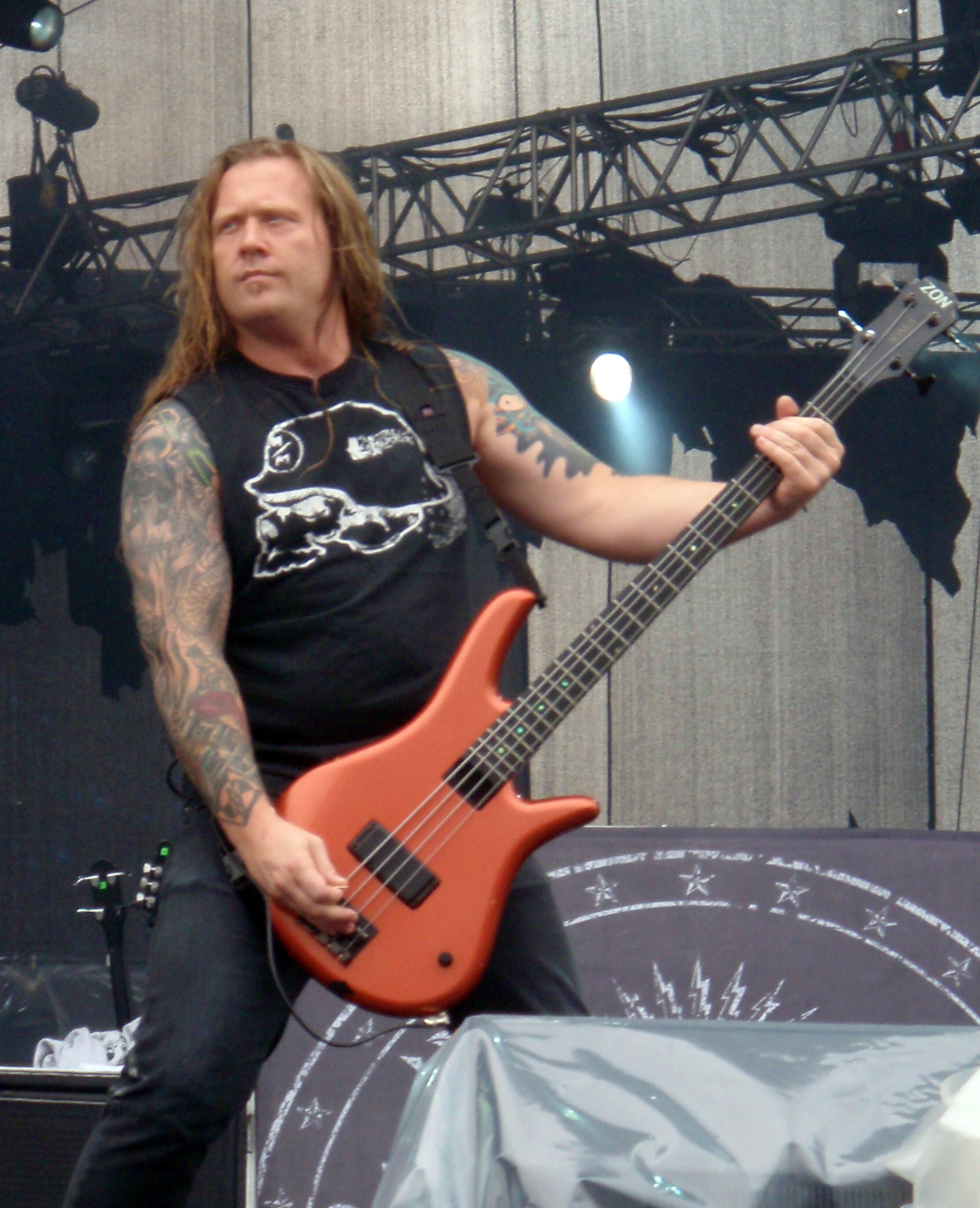
Adam Duce (Machine Head) playing a Sonus model

- Adam Duce (Machine Head)
- Arion Salazar (Third Eye Blind)
- Billy Gould (Faith No More)
- Brett Bamberger (Revocation)
- Dick Lövgren (Meshuggah)
- Jim Crichton (Saga)
- Joaquín Cardiel (Heroes del Silencio)
- Joe Lester (Intronaut)
- John Wetton (Asia)
- Jonni Lightfoot (Air Supply)
- Liam Wilson (The Dillinger Escape Plan)
- Mark King (Level 42)
- Mel Schacher (Grand Funk Railroad)
- Michael Manring
- Paulo Jr. (Sepultura)
- Reita (The Gazette)
- Robert Trujillo (Metallica)
- Scott Clendenin (Death)
- Tetsuya "tetsu" Ogawa (L'Arc~en~Ciel)
- Tim Butler (The Psychedelic Furs)
- Tony Campos (Static-X)
- Tony Choy (Atheist)
- Jeph Howard (The Used)
- Troy Sanders (Mastodon)
- Albin Suffys
