= Jol Dantzig =

American artist and songwriter

- Born: Jolyon C. Dantzig; Chicago, Illinois
- Occupation(s): artist, songwriter, designer, guitarist, luthier, author

Jolyon C. Dantzig (Jol Dantzig) is an American artist, songwriter, designer, guitarist, luthier, author and one of the founders of Hamer Guitars.

== Biography ==
Born in Chicago, Jolyon (Jol) Dantzig began playing guitar and piano in grade school. He studied guitar with local teachers, most notably local blues guitarist Michael Bloomfield. Dantzig attended Evanston Township High School where he studied photography. Dantzig continued his art education at the Art Institute of Chicago. While still in his early twenties, he became a touring musician, playing guitar, bass and singing in numerous rock and R&B bands. Dantzig also supported himself by buying and selling used guitars and running a band equipment rental company. Beginning in 1969 Dantzig took a number of factory jobs to supplement his income. This provided the opportunity to learn about how manufacturing plants operated. Other jobs included machining, woodworking, shipping and electronics. More experience included working as a machinist's assistant in a famous motorcycle parts manufacturer known as Frank's Forks. A stint as a repair tech at Music Dealer Service in Chicago was where Dantzig learned guitar setup and repair. During this time Dantzig was a frequent visitor at Božo Podunavac's luthiery shop, picking up tips from Podunavac. Another mentor was Jim Beach owner of Wooden Music in Chicago.

In 1973, Dantzig became a partner in Northern Prairie Music, one of the first shops selling "vintage" instruments to professional musicians and collectors. Northern Prairie was started by Craig Hendee. Hendee's protégé was a young guitarist named Paul Hamer. Dantzig met Hendee and Hamer through Gary Gand, a mutual friend. Dantzig became a partner in the business after Hendee left.

Dantzig along with repairman John Montgomery, built a custom Flying V bass guitar. As interest grew they began supplying custom guitars directly to musicians via the Northern Prairie storefront and through advertisements in Guitar Player magazine under the "Hamer" name in 1974. Hamer Guitars was incorporated in 1976.

During the 1970s and early '80s Hamer Guitars grew in size and reputation. During this period Dantzig designed Hamer's systems and tooling, and trained employees.

At Hamer Dantzig was responsible for designing instruments for many of biggest names in music including all four of The Beatles, three of The Rolling Stones and every member of The Pretenders, Def Leppard and The Police. Hamer Guitars was acquired by Kaman Music (a distribution firm) in 1988. Kaman Music (and Hamer Guitars) was acquired by Fender Musical Instruments Inc. in 2007.

Dantzig relocated to Northern California in 1992 to start the Dantzig Design Group, a graphic design and Internet content company. He continued to serve as a consultant to Kaman Music as well as a host of other music industry companies.

At the request of Kaman, Dantzig returned to Hamer as Technical Director in 1997 when the facility was moved to Connecticut. Dantzig was charged with the task of breaking down Hamer's Arlington Heights factory, shipping everything and reassembling the factory in New Hartford, Connecticut.

Hamer was acquired by Fender Musical Instruments in 2008. Dantzig worked in various capacities for Fender until early 2010. Hamer no longer builds any American guitars and does not have any affiliation with former Hamer owner Dantzig.

In early 2010 Dantzig left Fender and is building instruments under the Dantzig name.

Dantzig resides in Connecticut where he is the owner of Jol Dantzig Guitar Design.

== Guitar building achievements ==
One of Dantzig's most famous pieces is an orange five-neck guitar built in 1981 for Rick Nielsen of the band Cheap Trick. This guitar was exhibited at the Boston Museum of Fine Art. Some of Dantzig's other designs were also featured in an exhibition at the Smithsonian Institution, and The Metropolitan Museum of Art New York. Dantzig's guitar designs have earned eight Editors Pick awards from Guitar Player Magazine. Dantzig is sometimes referred to as the "Godfather" of the boutique guitar, although he disputes this claim.

== Musical achievements ==
Although Dantzig was busy with his various business ventures, he has remained an active musician. Over the years he has written and performed music for several feature films including End of the Line and One More Saturday Night. His guitar and vocal work appears on recordings by Freddie Scott, Buddy Guy, Wilson Pickett, Frank Black, Jim Carrol and Shaw-Blades.
