= Detuner =

Device to retune a stringed instrument

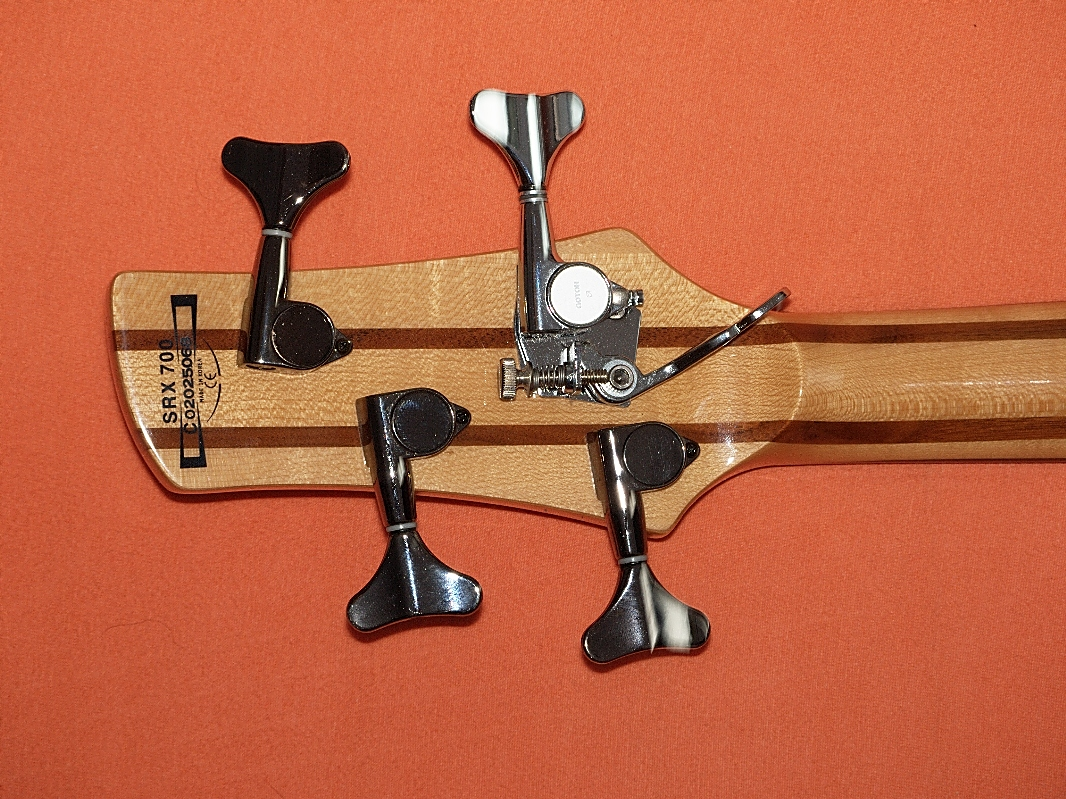
Bass guitar headstock with detuner set to D position.

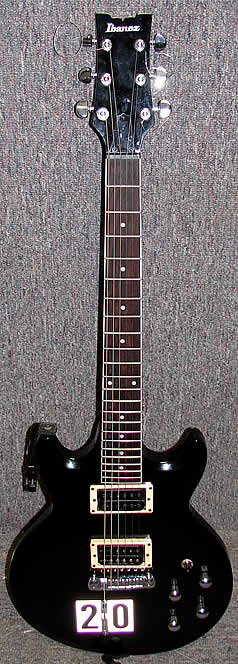
Ibanez AX125 w/ Drop D tuner

Detuners are mechanical devices used to simplify the tuning of a stringed instrument during performance. This allows musicians to quickly and accurately reach notes outside the normal range of their instruments. These devices are also known by other names including 'drop head' and 'hipshot'.

They can be fitted at either or both ends of any or all of the strings. For example, a relatively common arrangement on the bass guitar is to use a detuner on the lowest string to allow the bassist to switch between 'standard tuning' (E A D G) and 'drop D' (D A D G). The latter provides two extra notes (D and D# / Eb) that are particularly useful in several common keys.

However, there are many possible variants – for example, bass guitarist Michael Manring has made extensive use of detuners in some of his compositions and has a four-stringed bass guitar with multiple detuners. Bass guitarist and YouTuber Charles Berthoud also makes extensive use of detuners, generally on a LeFay D-Tuner (which as the name hints was designed with a detuner on each string). Adrian Legg is a popular guitarist making use of rapid tuning changes. He was prominent in the late 1980s.

The idea may have originated from the double bass extenders.
