= Bass guitar =

Electric plucked string instrument

Electric bass guitar
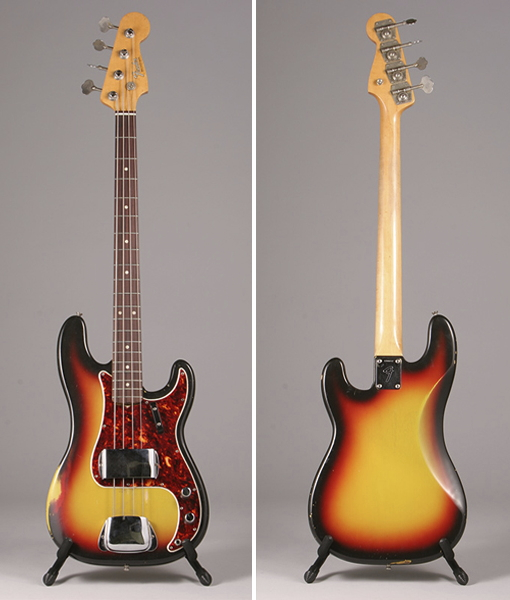
- Fender Precision Bass

String instrument
- Other names: Electric bass guitar, electric bass, bass
- Classification: String instrument
- Hornbostel–Sachs classification: 321.322 (Composite chordophone)
- Inventor: Paul Tutmarc
- Developed: 1930s, United States

Playing range
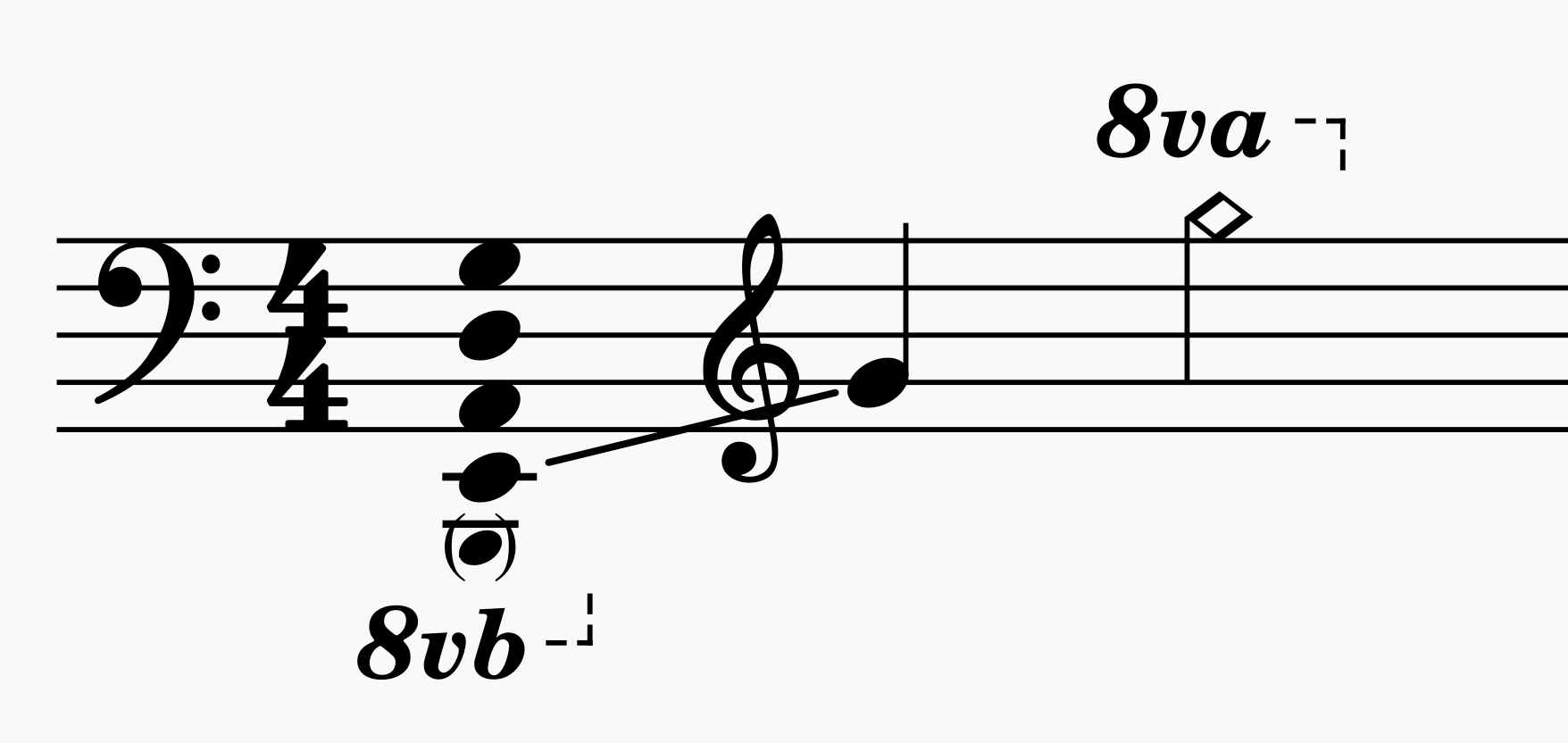
- Range of a standard tuned 4-string bass guitar (brackets: 5-string)

Related instruments
- Electric guitar; Double bass; Acoustic bass guitar; Ukulele bass; Fretless bass; Electric upright bass

Sound sample
- Bassline played on a bass guitar using a pick: file; help

The bass guitar, also known as the electric bass (or simply bass), is the lowest-pitched member of the guitar family. It is similar in appearance and construction to an electric guitar but with a longer neck and scale length. The electric bass guitar most commonly has four strings, though five-, six-, seven-, eight- and twelve-stringed models are also built. The electric bass guitar was invented in the mid-1950s to replace the double bass in popular music due to its lighter weight, smaller size and easier portability, most models' inclusion of frets for easier intonation, and electromagnetic pickups for amplification.

The electric bass guitar is usually tuned the same as the double bass, corresponding to pitches one octave lower than the four lowest-pitched strings of a guitar, typically E, A, D, and G (5-string models typically add a low B, and 6-string models typically add a high C). It is played with the fingers, thumb or with a pick.

Because the electric bass guitar is a quiet instrument acoustically, it requires external amplification, generally via electromagnetic or piezo-electric pickups. It can also be used with direct input boxes, audio interfaces, mixing consoles, computers, or bass-effects processors which offer headphone jacks.

== Terminology ==
The New Grove Dictionary of Music and Musicians refers to this instrument as an "Electric bass guitar, usually with four heavy strings tuned E_{1}'–A_{1}'–D_{2}–G_{2}." It also defines bass as "Bass (iv). A contraction of Double bass or Electric bass guitar." Mottola's Cyclopedic Dictionary of Lutherie Terms begins its definition of the instrument as "A bass guitar that produces sound primarily with the aid of electronic devices." According to some authors the proper term is "electric bass". Common names for the instrument are "bass guitar", "electric bass guitar", "electric bass", and simply "bass". and some authors claim that they are historically accurate. A bass guitar whose neck lacks frets is termed a fretless bass.

=== Scale ===
The scale of a bass is defined as the length of the vibrating strings between the nut and the bridge saddles. On a modern 4-string electric bass guitar, 30" (76 cm) or less is considered short scale, 32" (81 cm) medium scale, 34" (86 cm) standard scale and 35" (89 cm) long scale. Long scale is more commonly seen on 5-string basses and above to allow for better resonance of the low B string.

The double bass is "acoustically imperfect" like the viola. For a double bass to be acoustically perfect, its body size would have to be twice as that of a cello, rendering it practically unplayable, so the double bass is made smaller to make it playable. The pickups in an electric bass guitar addresses the compromises of a double bass by allowing the low notes to be amplified electronically.

=== Pickup ===
Pickups are attached to the body of the guitar beneath the strings. They are responsible for converting the vibrations of the strings into interference of a magnetic field which is converted into analogous electrical voltage sent as input to an instrument amplifier.

=== Strings ===
Bass guitar strings are composed of a core and winding. The core is a wire which runs through the center of the string and is made of steel, nickel, or an alloy. The winding is a smaller gauge wire wrapped around the core. Bass guitar strings vary by the material and cross-sectional shape of the winding.

Common string variants include roundwound, flatwound, halfwound (groundwound), coated, tapewound and taperwound strings. Roundwound and flatwound strings feature windings with circular and rounded-square cross-sections, respectively, with half-round strings being a hybrid between the two. Coated strings have their surface coated with a synthetic layer while tapewound strings feature a metal core with a plastic winding. Taperwound strings have a tapered end where the exposed core sits on the bridge saddle without windings. The choice of winding has considerable impact on the sound of the instrument, with certain winding styles often being preferred for certain musical genres.

== History ==
=== 1930s ===
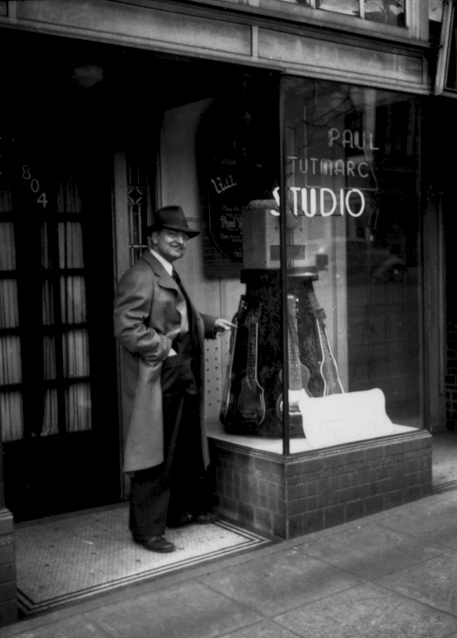
Paul Tutmarc, inventor of the modern bass guitar, outside his music store in Seattle, Washington

In the 1930s, musician and inventor Paul Tutmarc of Seattle, Washington, developed the first electric bass guitar in its modern form, a fretted four-string instrument designed to be played horizontally in a position similar to a standard guitar. The 1935 sales catalog for Tutmarc's company Audiovox featured the "Model 736 Bass Fiddle", a solid body electric bass guitar with four strings, a 30 1/2-inch (775-millimetre) scale length, and a single pickup. Around 100 were made during this period. Audiovox also sold their "Model 236" bass amplifier.

=== 1950s ===
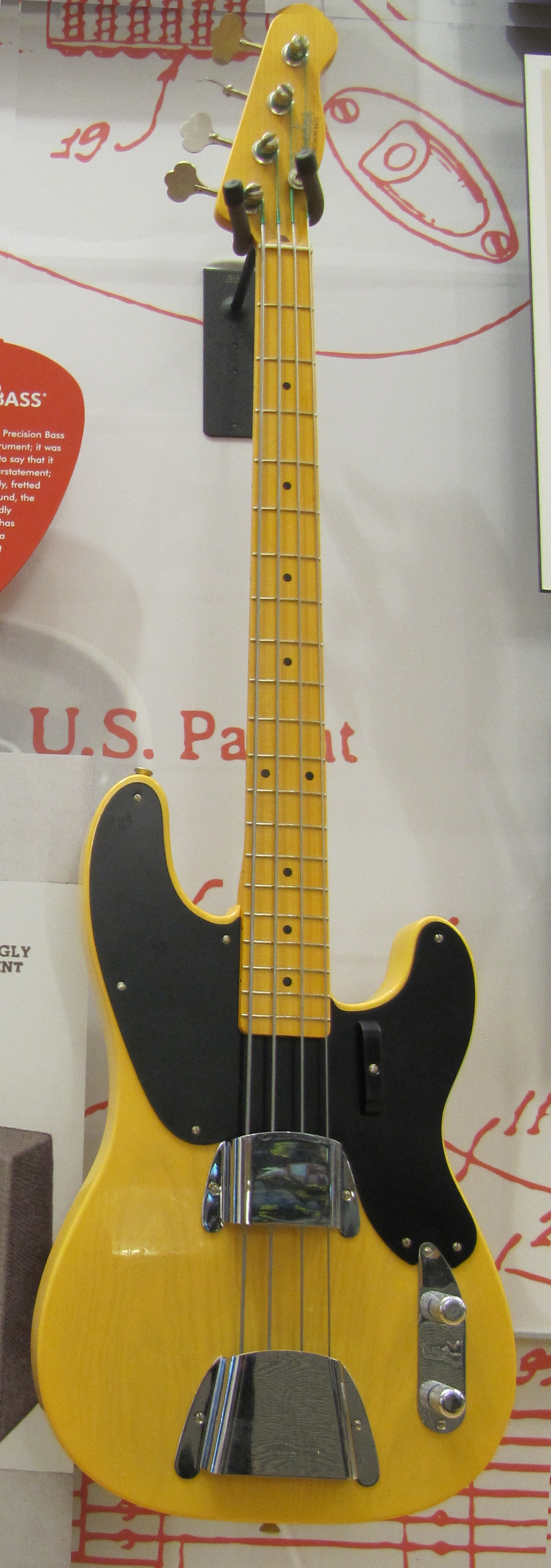
An early Fender Precision Bass

In the 1950s, Leo Fender and George Fullerton developed the first mass-produced electric bass guitar. The Fender Electric Instrument Manufacturing Company began producing the Precision Bass, or P-Bass, in October 1951. The design featured a simple uncontoured "slab" body design (with no edge contours) and a single coil pickup, both features similar to a Telecaster. By 1957, the Precision Bass began to resemble the Fender Stratocaster with the body edges beveled for comfort and the pickup changed to a separate halves split coil design.

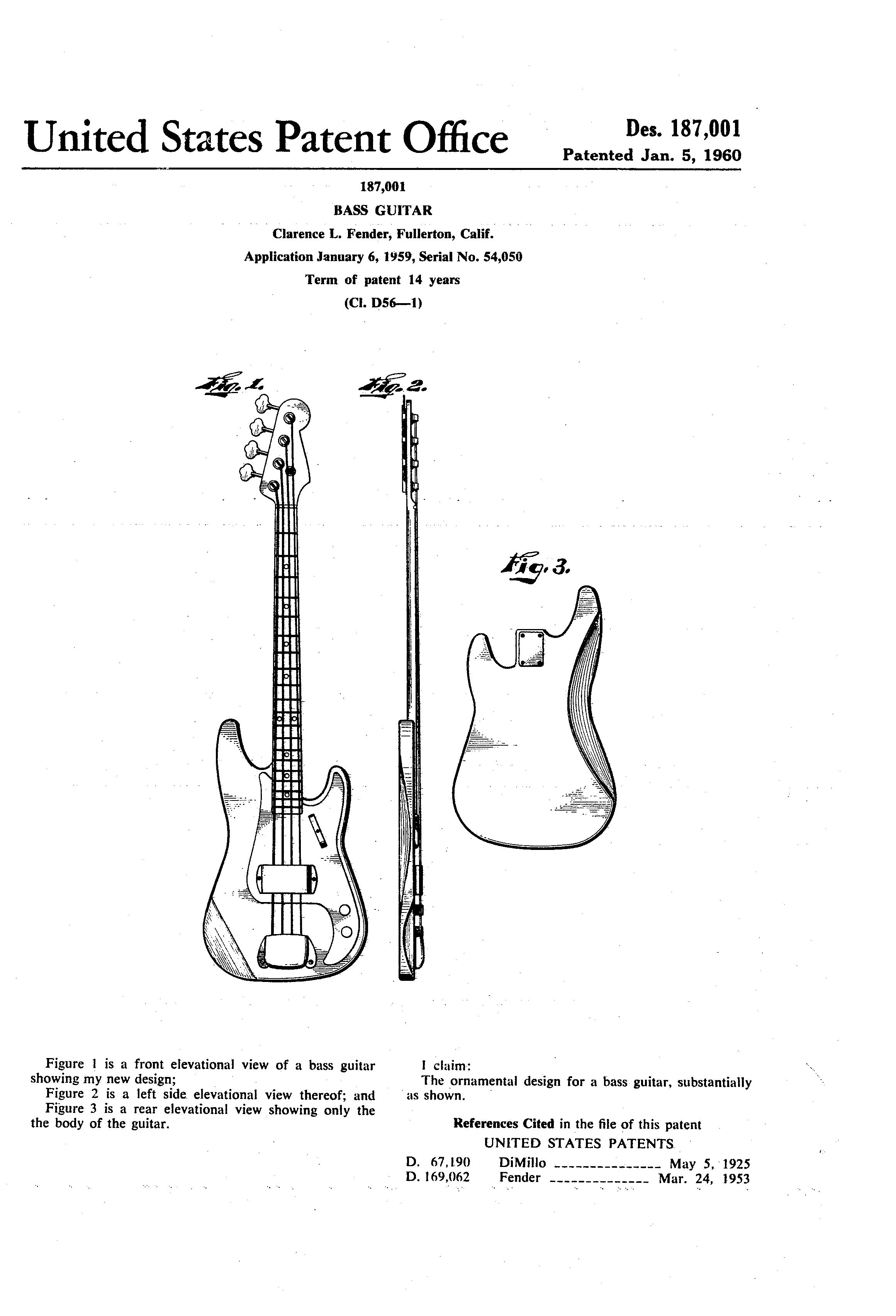
Design patent issued to Leo Fender for the second-generation Precision Bass

The Fender Bass was a revolutionary instrument for working musicians. In comparison to the upright bass, the bass guitar could be easily transported. When amplified, the bass guitar was also much less prone than acoustic basses to audio feedback. The addition of frets enabled bassists to play in tune more easily than on upright basses (the "precision" of the Fender model) and allowed guitarists to more easily adapt to the new instrument.

In 1953, Monk Montgomery became the first bassist to tour with the Fender bass, in Lionel Hampton's postwar big band. Montgomery was also possibly the first to record with the electric bass, in a session on July 2, 1953, with the Art Farmer Septet. Roy Johnson (with Lionel Hampton), and Shifty Henry (with Louis Jordan and His Tympany Five), were other early Fender bass pioneers. Bill Black, who played with Elvis Presley and James Jamerson switched from upright bass to the Fender Precision Bass around 1957. The bass guitar was intended to appeal to guitarists as well as upright bass players, and many early pioneers of the instrument, such as Joe Osborn, and Paul McCartney were originally guitarists.

Also in 1953, Gibson released the first short-scale violin-shaped electric bass, the EB-1, with an extendable end pin so a bassist could play it upright or horizontally. In 1958, Gibson released the maple arched-top EB-2 described in the Gibson catalog as a "hollow-body electric bass that features a Bass/Baritone pushbutton for two different tonal characteristics". In 1959, these were followed by the more conventional-looking EB-0 Bass. The EB-0 was very similar to a Gibson SG in appearance (although the earliest examples have a slab-sided body shape closer to that of the double-cutaway Les Paul Special). The Fender and Gibson versions used bolt-on and set necks.

Several other companies also began manufacturing bass guitars during the 1950s. Kay Musical Instrument Company began production of the K162 in 1952. Also in 1956, at the German trade fair "Musikmesse Frankfurt", the distinctive Höfner 500/1 viola-shaped bass first appeared, constructed using violin techniques by Walter Höfner, a second-generation violin luthier. Due to its use by Paul McCartney, it became known as the "Beatle bass". In 1957, Rickenbacker introduced the model 4000, the first bass to feature a neck-through-body design in which the neck is part of the body wood. The Burns London Supersound was introduced in 1958.

=== 1960s ===
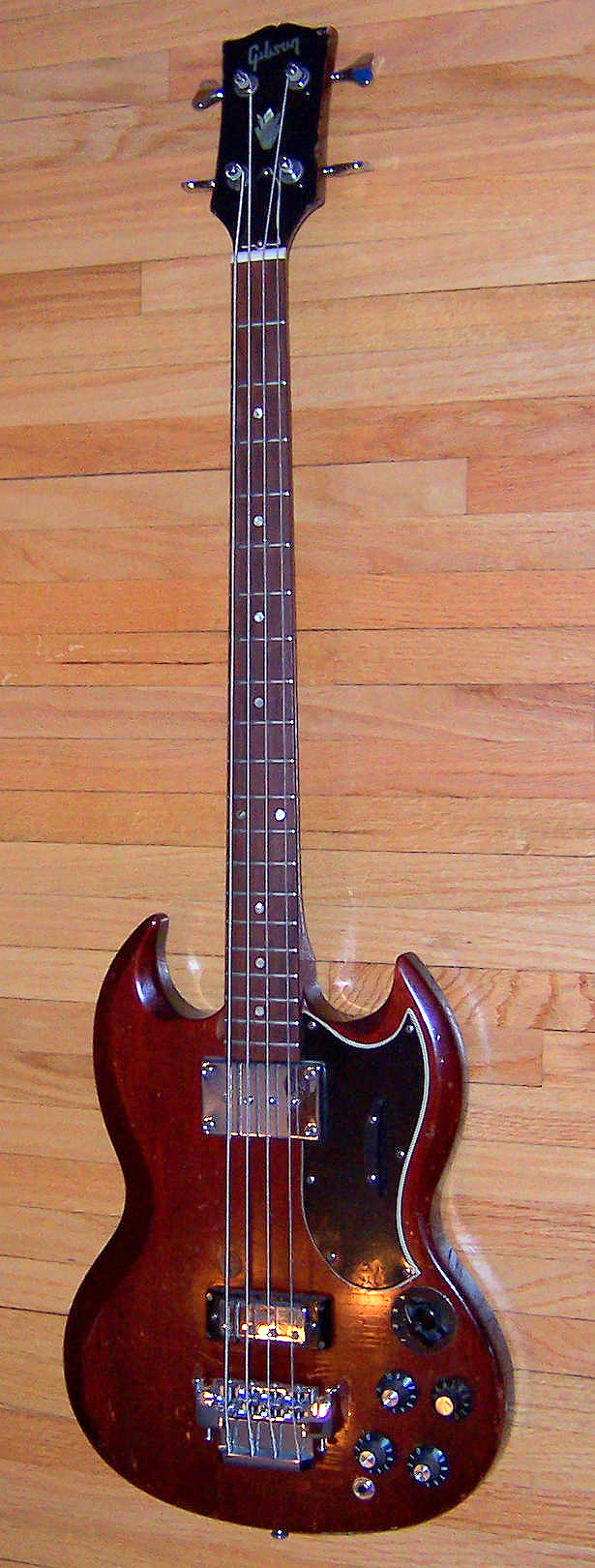
Gibson EB-3

With the explosion in popularity of rock music in the 1960s, many more manufacturers began making electric basses, including Yamaha, Teisco and Guyatone. Introduced in 1960, the Fender Jazz Bass, initially known as the "Deluxe Bass", used a body design known as an offset waist which was first seen on the Jazzmaster guitar in an effort to improve comfort while playing seated. The Jazz bass, or J-Bass, features two single-coil pickups.

Providing a more "Gibson-scale" instrument, rather than the 34-inch (864 mm) Jazz and Precision, Fender produced the Mustang Bass, a 30-inch (762 mm) scale-length instrument. The Fender VI, a 6-string bass, was tuned one octave lower than standard guitar tuning. It was released in 1961, and was briefly favored by Jack Bruce of Cream.

Gibson introduced its short-scale 30.5-inch (775 mm) EB-3 in 1961, also used by Bruce. The EB-3 had a "mini-humbucker" at the bridge position. Gibson basses tended to be instruments with a shorter 30.5" scale length than the Precision. Gibson did not produce a 34-inch (864 mm)-scale bass until 1963 with the release of the Thunderbird.

The first commercial fretless bass guitar was the Ampeg AUB-1, introduced in 1966. In the late 1960s, eight-string basses, with four octave paired courses (similar to a 12 string guitar), were introduced, such as the Hagström H8.

=== 1970s ===
In 1972, Alembic established what became known as "boutique" or "high-end" electric bass guitars. These expensive, custom-tailored instruments, as used by Phil Lesh, Jack Casady, and Stanley Clarke, featured unique designs, premium hand-finished wood bodies, and innovative construction techniques such as multi-laminate neck-through-body construction and graphite necks. Alembic also pioneered the use of onboard electronics for pre-amplification and equalization.

Active electronics increase the output of the instrument, and allow more options for controlling tonal flexibility, giving the player the ability to amplify as well as to attenuate certain frequency ranges while improving the overall frequency response (including more low-register and high-register sounds). 1976 saw the UK company Wal begin production of their own range of active basses. In 1974 Music Man Instruments, founded by Tom Walker, Forrest White and Leo Fender, introduced the StingRay, the first widely produced bass with active (powered) electronics built into the instrument. Basses with active electronics can include a preamplifier and knobs for boosting and cutting the low and high frequencies.

In the mid-1970s, five-string basses, with a very low "B" string, were introduced. In 1975, bassist Anthony Jackson commissioned luthier Carl Thompson to build a six-string bass tuned (low to high) B0, E1, A1, D2, G2, C3, adding a low B string and a high C string.

== See also ==
- Acoustic bass guitar
- Fretless bass
- Bass guitar tuning
- Bass instrument amplification
- Extended-range bass
- Bass effects
- Pickups
- List of bass guitar manufacturers
- List of bass guitarists

== Bibliography ==
- Bacon, Tony (2010). 60 Years of Fender: Six Decades of the Greatest Electric Guitars. Backbeat Books. ISBN 978-0879309664.
- Bacon, Tony; Moorhouse, Barry (2016). The Bass Book: A Complete Illustrated History of Bass Guitars. Backbeat Books. ISBN 978-1-4950-0150-5.
- Black, J. W. (2001). The Fender Bass: An Illustrated History. Hal Leonard. ISBN 0-634-02640-2.
- Boyer, Paul (2013). The Rickenbacker Electric Bass: 50 Years As Rock's Bottom. Hal Leonard. ISBN 978-1-4768-8680-0.
- Evans, Tom; Evans, Mary Ann (1977). Guitars: From the Renaissance to Rock. Facts On File. ISBN 0-87196-636-0.
- George, Nelson (1998). Hip Hop America. Viking Press. ISBN 978-0-670-87153-7.
- Roberts, Jim (2001). How The Fender Bass Changed the World. San Francisco, California: Backbeat Books. ISBN 0-87930-630-0.
- Sadie, Stanley; Tyrrell, John (2001). The New Grove Dictionary of Music and Musicians (Second ed.). Oxford: Oxford University Press.
- Slog, John J.; Coryat, Karl (1999). The Bass Player Book: Equipment, Technique, Styles and Artists. Backbeat Books. ISBN 0-87930-573-8.
- Trynka, Paul (1996). Rock Hardware. Hal Leonard. ISBN 0-87930-428-6.
- Wheeler, Tom (1978). The Guitar Book: A Handbook for Electric and Acoustic Guitarists. Harper & Row. ISBN 0-06-014579-X.
