= Early Days (The Zombies album) =

Compilation album by the Zombies
- Released: 2 June 1969
- Recorded: 12 June 1964 – 4 May 1966
- Studios: Decca and Lansdowne, London
- Genre: Pop
- Length: 26:55
- Label: London
- Producer: Ken Jones

The Zombies US chronology
Odessey and Oracle (1968)	Early Days (1969)	Time of the Zombies (1974)

Early Days is a compilation album by British band the Zombies, released in 1969 by London Recordings. Despite disbanding in December 1967, the Zombies had a major US hit in early 1969 with "Time of the Season", prompting their US record label London to capitalize on their recent success. The material on Early Days was recorded between June 1964 and May 1966 at Decca and Lansdowne Studios in London with Ken Jones producing. Musically, it compiles primarily tracks that were issued as single A- and B-sides in the US between September 1964 and July 1966, with two previously unreleased tracks. The Zombies members Rod Argent and Chris White remixed almost all of the album's tracks into stereo specifically for the album's release.

Issued as the Zombies' first compilation album in the US, Early Days was released by London on 2 June 1969, sporting a hand-drawn album cover. Early Days failed to chart on the Billboard Top LP's, despite being one of the only sources for stereo mixes of the band's early material. It was reissued as part of a Zombies album box set in 2019. Upon release, the album received good reviews, with focus on the material. Retrospective assessment has considered Early Days as a superfluous release, with a disappointing track listing and subpar mixes

== Background and composition ==
British pop group the Zombies broke up after a gig in Hereford on 20 December 1967, with their split being announced in March 1968. Their 1968 album Odessey and Oracle "passed virtually unnoticed" upon initial release. However, the third single from the album, "Time of the Season", started gaining traction in the US in early 1969, after a re-release of it on Date Records in December 1968. It eventually peaked at number three on the Billboard Hot 100 in March 1969, prompting retrospective interest in the Zombies, despite their breakup. Ken Barnes, writing for Phonograph Record, opined Early Days was a "final consequence of 'Time Of The Season''s fluke Top 5 achievement".

The material that was included on Early Days had been recorded during the Zombies contract with Decca Records in the UK. Almost all of the material on the album had been taped at Decca Studios between 12 June 1964 and 24 June 1965; the sole exceptions were "Indication" and "She Does Everything for Me", which were recorded at Lansdowne Studios on 4 May 1966. All the material had initially been produced by Ken Jones. Ten out of the album's 12 tracks had appeared as single A- or B-sides in the US through Parrot Records between September 1964 and July 1966. With the exception of the singles "She's Not There" and "Tell Her No" that had been included on their eponymous US debut album in 1965, the material otherwise were previously exclusive to singles. Early Days did mark the first US release for two tracks; "Kind of Girl" from their British EP The Zombies in January 1965, and "She Does Everything For Me" which had initially been released as the B-side of the Zombies' UK-only single "Goin' Out of My Head" in March 1967.

With the stereo album marked "booming in the US", Parrot's head label London Recordings had an engineer for Decca in the UK revisit the multitrack tapes for stereo mixes to be included on Early Days. According to band biographer Greg Russo, both the Zombies keyboardist Rod Argent and bassist Chris White were present at the mixing session together with engineer Peter Vince. All tracks were mixed to stereo in a single day, on 24 March 1969. Two stereo mixes were prepared for the album, though ultimately not included, those being for "I'm Goin' Home" and "Tell Her No". (Note: On the album's release, "Tell Her No" was presented in rechanneled stereo, a decision Greg Russo labelled as "inexplicable".) The mix of "Indication" on Early Days was a longer version with an extended outro, the original single on Parrot having an earlier fade. The US-only single "I Want You Back Again" was presented in an alternative, earlier recording to the single on Early Days, although it was not identified at the time as being an alternative take.

== Release ==
Early Days was initially released in the US through London on 2 June 1969, as the first of "numerous reissues of the Zombies material". (Note: Catalogue number London PS 557.) According to Russo, London "made sure to catch the interest of Zombies fans" with Early Days, though the album did not chart on the Billboard Top LP's chart upon release. The album's cover art was a hand-drawn painting, which Joe Marchese of The Second Disc opined was psychedelic. According to biographer Alec Palao, all stereo versions of the Zombies' Decca material up until the release of The Decca Stereo Anthology in 2002 had originated from either the Early Days album or a UK-only compilation titled The World of the Zombies in 1970. Considered a "long-lost LP", Early Days was first reissued as part of the five-album box set In the Beginning, issued by Demon Music Group in 2019.

== Reception ==
Professional ratings
Review scores
Source	Rating
AllMusic	3/5 stars

Upon release, the album received primarily positive reviews; the staff critic for Billboard wrote that it was a "real treat" for "any lover" of rock and roll, and that it further featured the best of "what is called 'the British sound'. They singled out "She's Not There" and "You Make Me Feel Good" as the album's best tracks, singling out the latter as a "gem". They further opined it "might well prove to be a potent sales package as well" owing to the success of "Time of the Season". Writing for Rolling Stone, critic John Mendelsohn classified Early Days as an album on which "almost all of which will be tremendously dug" by people who were even "today [1969] knocked out" by the Beatles' Meet the Beatles! and the Hollies' Hear! Here!, calling it a "timelessly bopping" artifact of that "warmly-recalled time of the season".

Ken Barnes opined that there were "manifold annoyances surrounding" it, inamongst other things, he believed that the mixes were "inferior", the cover art was "embarrassing", and that the song selection could have been improved, even though it acted as a "Godsend" when it was first released as it contained otherwise unavailable material. The mixes have received similar criticism from retrospective reviewers; Russo felt that the "initial mono impact of some tracks could not be duplicated in stereo", and Palao felt that these original mixes were "half-baked takes". Metal Mike Saunders from Fusion magazine further added that several songs sounded "either re-mixed or re-recorded", and that the album was substantially flawed by the inclusion of "I Want You Back Again" and "She Does Everything for Me", albeit feeling that it was the band's best album. According to Richie Unterberger, Early Days was a "mish-mash" of tracks that had been made obsolete by the band's future compilation albums.

== Track listing ==
Track lengths adapted from the original LP release.

Side one

1. "Whenever You're Ready" (Rod Argent) – 2:30
2. "Don't Go Away" (Chris White) – 2:28
3. "She's Not There" (Argent) – 2:19
4. "I Love You" (White) – 3:03
5. "Leave Me Be" (White) – 2:01
6. "Indication" (Argent) – 1:54

Side two

1. "She Does Everything for Me" (Argent) – 2:10
2. "You Make Me Feel Good" (White) – 2:31
3. "Tell Her No" (Argent) – 2:02
4. "I Want You Back Again" (Argent) – 2:03
5. "Kind of Girl" (Note: On the original LP release, the song is referred to as "Kinda Girl".) (Argent) – 2:04
6. "I Must Move" (White) – 1:50

== Personnel ==
Personnel according to the liner notes of the 2002 compilation The Decca Stereo Anthology, unless otherwise noted.

The Zombies

- Colin Blunstone – vocals, percussion
- Rod Argent – piano, Hohner Pianet, Vox Continental, vocals, harmonica; stereo remix
- Paul Atkinson – acoustic guitar, 6-string electric guitars, 12-string electric guitars
- Chris White – bass guitar, vocals; stereo remix
- Hugh Grundy – drums, percussion

Other personnel

- Ken Jones – production; piano, percussion
- Gus Dudgeon – engineer (1–3, 4, 8–10 & 12)
- Terry Johnson – engineer (3, 5, 8 & 11)
- Derek Varnals – engineer (1 & 2)
- Adrian Kerridge – engineer (6 & 7)
- Peter Vince – stereo remix

== Sources ==
- Anon. (1969). Early Days (LP liner notes). United States: London. PS 557.
- Johansen, Claes (2001). The Zombies - Hung Up on a Dream: A Biography 1962-1967. United Kingdom: SAF. ISBN 0 946719 34 9.
- Palao, Alec (1997). Zombie Heaven (Box set liner notes). United Kingdom: Big Beat. ZOMBOX 7.
- Palao, Alec (2002). The Decca Stereo Anthology (CD liner notes). United Kingdom: Big Beat. CDWIK2 225.
- Russo, Greg (2016). Time Of The Season: The Zombies Collector's Guide (4th ed.). United States: CrossFire. ISBN 978-0-9791845-9-8.
