= I Can't Make Up My Mind =

1965 song by the Zombies

- Label of Filipino single release

Song by the Zombies

from the album Begin Here
- Released: 9 April 1965
- Recorded: 10 December 1964
- Studio: Decca, London
- Genre: Pop
- Length: 2:34
- Label: Decca
- Songwriter: Chris White
- Producer: Ken Jones

Licensed audio
- "I Can't Make Up My Mind" on YouTube

"I Can't Make Up My Mind" is a song written by bass guitarist Chris White and first recorded by his band the Zombies. The band recorded the song alongside several other titles at a recording session at Decca Studios in London on 10 December 1964, with Ken Jones producing. A pop song, it shifts between major and minor keys and is based around a guitar riff played by Paul Atkinson on a twelve-string guitar. Lyrically, "I Can't Make Up My Mind" regards indecision about a relationship from a narrator who is looking for advice.

Decca Records first released "I Can't Make Up My Mind" on the Zombies' British debut album Begin Here on 9 April 1965, where it was the album's third track and first original composition. In the US, Parrot Records passed on releasing it on their eponymous US debut album, and it remained unreleased there until 1990. Retrospectively, the song has received praise by music critics and has been considered one of Begin Here's stronger tracks, with some specifically praising the song's vocal performance and others suggests it marked a maturation in the band's songwriting.

== Recording ==
After returning from a two-week tour of Scandinavia on 8 December 1964, the Zombies convened at Decca Studios in West Hampstead, London on 10 December to record the final batch of songs aimed at album release. Recorded at the session were bassist Chris White's "I Can't Make Up My Mind", Rod Argent's "The Way I Feel Inside", producer Ken Jones' "Work 'n' Play" and three covers: "Can't Nobody Love You", "I Got My Mojo Working", and "You've Really Got a Hold on Me / Bring it on Home to Me". "I Can't Make Up myt Mind" was attempted in seven different takes, with the final one becoming the song's master. Production was handled by Ken Jones, and engineering was conducted by Gus Dudgeon. For the song, the band chose to use a fade out in the ending, something biographer Greg Russo notes as "a rarity in the Zombies canon".

== Lyrics and composition ==
We used 12-string on some records, but I gave it up, because the damn thing kept going out of tune. I had a Burns, which in the studio sounded good but on the road it was terrible. I think I took it to Sweden a couple of times. I also tried the Rickenbacker 360-12, but you had to have tiny fingers for that.

— Paul Atkinson (1997)

As with several other band compositions, "I Can't Make Up My Mind" uses shifts between major and minor keys. American Songwriter's Matt Friedlander wrote that the song contained a "slightly off-kilter beat". Biographer Emma Stott fekt it had a shade of the Kinks contemporary single "See My Friends" (1965). Biographer Claes Johansen notes the song's chord progression to have a "Spanish feel". The song prominently features a twelve-string guitar riff and arrangement, performed by guitarist Paul Atkinson on a recently purchased Burns. Stott argues Atkinson's twelve-string guitar guitar adds a bit of "muscle" to the recording. Stott notes that Atkinson uses a sharper and brighter tone in the song's introduction, in contrast to the guitar solo, which is "muddier". (Note: According to Russo, Atkinson had difficulties performing the guitar solo due to the tuning. Atkinson briefly stops playing the song's riff for a measure to prepare for the solo.) A staff reviewer for Goldmine suggested Atkinson played "folky" notes on the track. Peter Olafson of the Trouser Press wrote that the track was another "piece of Zombie-pop", as did Georgiy Starostin, who described it as a "sophisti-poppy".

Lyrically, biographyer Greg Russo described "I Can't Make Up My Mind" as "another Chris White song of indecision", with Starostin adding that it contained elements of "insecurity, jealousy, betrayal, and paranoia". It is about the narrator's girlfriend suggesting that they get back together, with the narrator being "desperate" for somebody to advise him. Stott believes that although the lyrics appear to be "unremarkable" at first glance, the inclusion of the girlfriend's perspective reflects an attempt by the band to move away from love songs towards a more "mature" outlook. Similarly, Johansen noted the lyrical topic with its' "pronounced references" to "domestic, married life" to have been composed by a songwriter as young as White. He further opined that the motif of returning "home" was a motif that remained in the Zombies lyrics, which stood in contrast to the "love" mentality of the 1960s. Colin Blunstone's vocal performance on the track is in a "shrewd echo", with "keening" backing vocals, which were performed by White with Rod Argent.

== Releases ==
"I Can't Make Up My Mind" sat shelved for nearly five months until it was eventually included on the Zombies' British debut album Begin Here, which Decca Records released in the UK on 9 April 1965. (Note: Catalogue number Decca LK 4697.) On the album, it was sequenced between "Summertime" and "The Way I Feel Inside". Following two cover songs, "I Can't Make Up My Mind" was the first original composition on the album. The song also marks the earliest appearance of twelve-string guitar on the album, something Stott notes as making it an effective follow-up to "Summertime" in its' "brooding mood". In the US, Parrot Records opted not to release the song as part of the Zombies eponymous debut album, instead substituting it, "Sticks and Stones", "Road Runner", "The Way I Feel Inside" and "I Remember When I Loved Her" for "Tell Her No", "Sometimes", and "It's Alright with Me".

The song remained unreleased in the US well into the 1970s, and did not see domestic release there until appeared on the compilation album The Zombies Greatest Hits, which was released by DCC Compact Classics on CD on 4 September 1990. (Note: Catalogue number DCC DZS-052.) Since then, "I Can't Make Up My Mind" has gone on to appear on a plethora of different compilations, including the career-spanning box set Zombie Heaven, issued by Big Beat Records on 8 December 1997. (Note: Catalogue number ZOMBOX 7.) As with most of the band's output for Decca, "I Remember When I Loved Her" received its' first stereo mix in 2002, which Big Beat released as part of the 2-CD album The Decca Stereo Anthology on 4 November 2002. (Note: Catalogue number Big Beat CDWIK2 225.)

== Reception ==
One of the great things about the band's two songwriters (Chris White and Rod Argent) was that there was a homogenous feel in the compositions, no matter who wrote them.

— Matthew Greenwald (AllMusic)

For Stott, "I Can't Make Up My Mind" was a track worth "waiting for". She further opined that the vocal performance created a "clarity" that stood in contrast to the vocal performance of "Summertime". Johansen praised the song as containing "all of the Zombies' high-quality trademarks", specifically noting the backing vocal performance. Writer Alec Palao praised it as "remarkably original" and as a "marvellous song". Russo felt that between the beginning to the "massively echoed" lead vocals, the song "gradually soared to exciting heights". Don Ciccone of Stereo Embers called the song a "suitably eclectic" composition, "restless like its' title". Matt Friedlander called it a "catchy, melodic song". On the contrary, Georgiy Starostin wrote that the song was a "little clumsy" and a bit "too directly Beatlesque" to be of any direct interest, despite possessing some "neat vocal hooks".

AllMusic's Matthew Greenwald wrote that "I Can't Make Up My Mind" was one of Begin Here's highlights, noting the melody as "breezy" and opining that the melancholy and emotional strength of their material was "brought into wonderful focus here". For Metal Mike Saunders of Fusion magazine, the song was "an instant Zombies classic" from the first note. He noted the backing vocal as "bizarre" and "enough to make you feel like thirteen again". For the Goldmine reviewer, the track's organ displayed a hint of psychedelia, which they opined "foreshadowed the hippie vibe" and left the listener "yearning for another hit". Olafson felt that the song held a sinister feel that the band previously had not achieved, placing the song "beyond anything the group had produced thus far", and signalled that the band's songwriters were "growing more skillful and adventurous", capable of much more than suggested by "their early models".

== Personnel ==
Personnel according to the liner notes of The Decca Stereo Anthology, unless otherwise noted.

The Zombies

- Colin Blunstone – vocals
- Rod Argent – Vox Continental organ, backing vocals
- Chris White – Gibson EB bass guitar, backing vocals
- Hugh Grundy – Ludwig drums
- Paul Atkinson – Burns twelve-string guitar

Other personnel

- Ken Jones – production
- Gus Dudgeon – recording engineer

== Sources ==
- Johansen, Claes (2001). The Zombies - Hung Up on a Dream: A Biography 1962-1967. United Kingdom: SAF. ISBN 0 946719 34 9.
- Palao, Alec (1997). Zombie Heaven (Box set liner notes). United Kingdom: Big Beat. ZOMBOX 7.
- Palao, Alec (2002). The Decca Stereo Anthology (CD liner notes). United Kingdom: Big Beat. CDWIK2 225.
- Russo, Greg (2016). Time Of The Season: The Zombies Collector's Guide (4th ed.). United States: CrossFire. ISBN 978-0-9791845-9-8.
- Stott, Emma (2025). The Zombies: Every Album, Every Song. United States: SonicBond. ISBN 978-1-7895249-3-2.
