= I Remember When I Loved Her =

1965 song by the Zombies

- US single label

Single by the Zombies

from the album Begin Here
- A-side: "I Want You Back Again" (US)
- Released: 31 May 1965
- Recorded: 25 November 1964
- Studio: Decca, London
- Genre: Folk rock
- Length: 2:02
- Label: Parrot
- Songwriter: Rod Argent
- Producer: Ken Jones

The Zombies US singles chronology
"She's Coming Home" (1965)	"I Want You Back Again" / "I Remember When I Loved Her" (1965)	"Just Out of Reach" (1965)

Licensed audio
- "I Remember When I Loved Her" on YouTube

"I Remember When I Loved Her" is a song written by British keyboardist Rod Argent and first recorded by his band The Zombies. The Zombies recorded the song amidst a row of other original composition at a session held at Decca Studios in London on 25 November 1964 with Ken Jones producing. Lyrically, the song is similar to many other early Zombies tracks, including "She's Not There" (1964), and regards broken romance from the perspective of a narrator who has been estranged by his former lover. Musically, "I Remember When I Loved Her" is a minor-key folk rock ballad which featured prominent tambourine flourishes that gives it a Latin feel. Often compared to the Beatles' "And I Love Her" (1964), it features an organ solo often described as "ghostly" and was written in a key that was low for vocalist Colin Blunstone.

Decca Records initially released "I Remember When I Loved Her" as an album track on the Zombies debut UK LP Begin Here on 9 April 1965. In the US, Parrot Records opted not to issue the track as part of the Zombies' eponymous debut album, instead releasing it as the B-side of their US-only single "I Want You Back Again" on 31 May 1965. Though a B-side, the song managed to chart in its own right, reaching the "bubbling under" charts published by both Cash Box and Record World. It has since appeared on numerous compilation albums, and was mixed into stereo in 2002. "I Remember When I Loved Her" received positive reviews by music critics, with some feeling it was strong enough to be released as a single in its own right, and others feeling it acted as a predecessor to their critically acclaimed album Odessey and Oracle (1968).

== Recording ==
Written by the Zombies keyboardist Rod Argent, "I Remember When I Loved Her" was recorded at a marathon session together with "I Don't Want to Know", an early version of "I Want You Back Again", "Tell Her No", an early version of "The Way I Feel Inside", "Walking in the Sun" and "What More Can I Do". The tracks were all taped at Decca Studios in West Hampstead, London, with Ken Jones producing and Gus Dudgeon engineering. The Zombies attempted 11 takes of "I Remember When I Loved Her", with take 9 becoming the master take. Though vocalist Colin Blunstone would play the tambourine while performing live, on the studio version of "I Remember When I Loved Her" it was overdubbed by Jones.

== Lyrics and composition ==
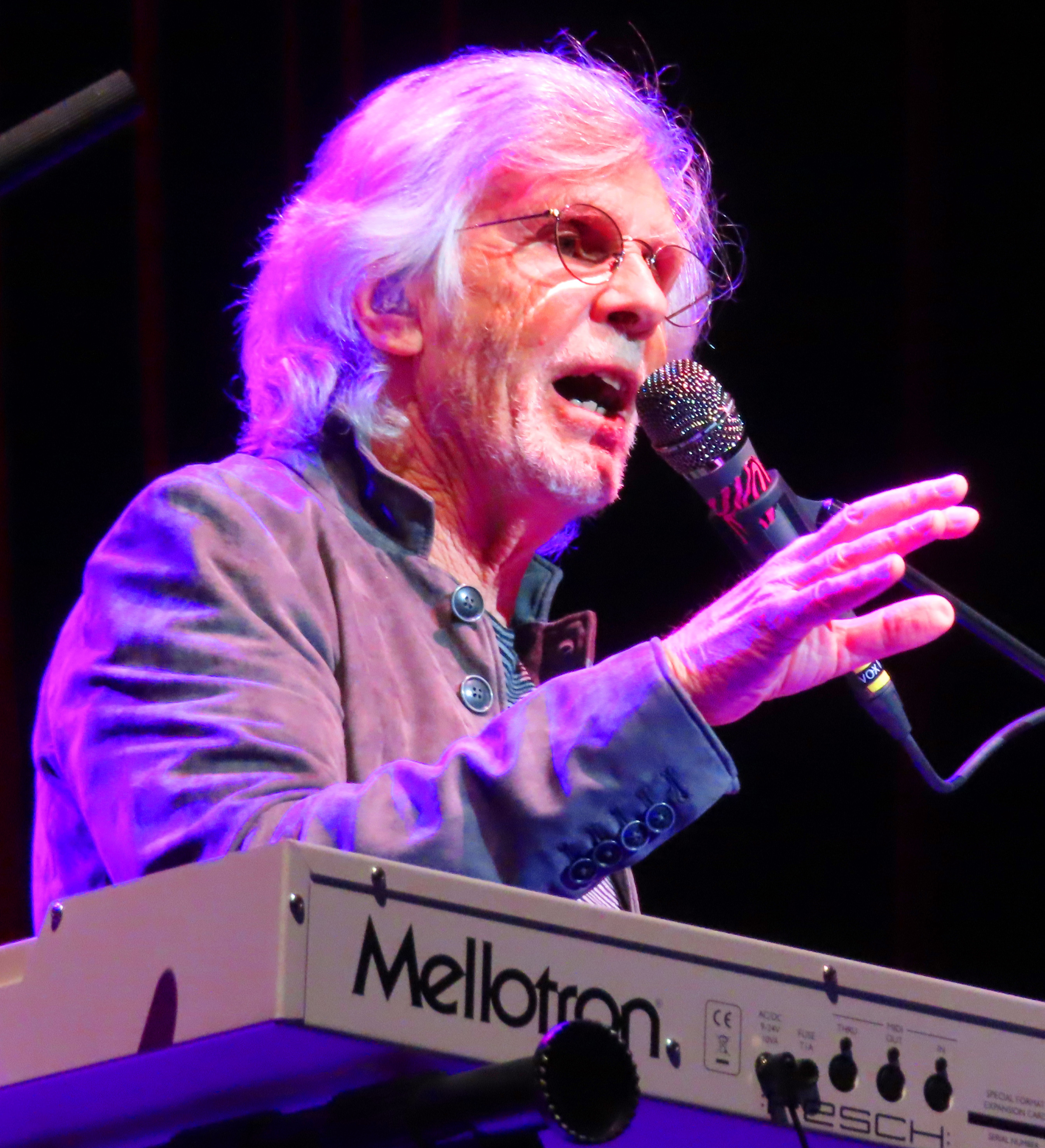
"I Remember When I Loved Her" shares similarities to other songs composed for the band by keyboardist Rod Argent.

"I Remember When I Loved Her" shares a "pleasing melancholy" with other early Zombies songs. According to group biographer Claes Johansen, "I Remember When I Loved Her" picks up lyrically from where their hit single "She's Not There" (1964) left off. According to critic Metal Mike Saunders, the line "now we are strange, no more in love" was "pure Zombies", and biographer Emma Stott felt that the line represented a double entendre; both in regards to being estranged and to the uncanny feeling of "being out of love". Bassist Chris White revelealed that Argent was "adament" on using that specific lyric", with Argent further adding that it was an "elegant phrase" used in an old Englishsense. Matthew Greenwald of AllMusic further stated that it was a reflection regarding the "melancholy of a broken romance". Stott further opined that the "frosty coolness" of the singer's former partner is narrated in the verse, emphasized by the backbeat of the percussion.

Musically, Greenwald characterized "I Remember When I Loved Her" as "minor-key ballad", as did Stott. Musicologist Alec Palao believed that the song "typifies the band's minor-key style", with a production that matched it. Claes Johansen opined that the song's chord progression would be much more "natural" for a guitarist to come up with, rather than a keyboardist like Argent. Because of the prominent tambourine flourishes, several critics have noted the song to have a Latin feel. Johansen elaborated that the distinct "Spanish feel" was created by accentuations in the arrangement. Peter Olafson from Trouser Press wrote that the track was a folk rock composition with a prominent acoustic guitar part. Greenwald noted a similarity to the Beatles' "And I Love Her" (1964), as did music critic Georgiy Starostin, who called it a "morose sequel" to "And I Love Her" in "a world where everything has eventually gone dead wrong" where the "singer’s loving feelings are just memories".

Rod Argent's organ solo on the track was used to "float above the eerie minor-keyed proceedings" according to biographer Greg Russo. Starostin wrote that the solo was "puffy cloud", with Johansen adding that it was a "ghostly solo" that contained more "ambience" that one would find in a Cathedral. He further writes that the solo adds an "almost morbid feel" to the narrator's description of his former lover. Similarly, Stott noted the solo as "ethereal" and as a musical interpretation of their love, which had "spirited away so easily". Johansen opined that the song was in a "rather low" key for Colin Blunstone, which gave him an opportunity to display his vocal range. Similarly, Olafson felt that Blunstone's performance was suitably "pathetic and passionate".

== Releases ==
"I Remember When I Loved Her" got its' first release on the Zombies' UK debut album Begin Here, which Decca Records released on 9 April 1965. (Note: Catalogue number Decca LK 4697.) In the US, Parrot Records opted not to release the song as part of the Zombies eponymous debut album, instead substituting it, "Sticks and Stones", "Road Runner", "The Way I Feel Inside" and "I Can't Make Up My Mind" for "Tell Her No", "Sometimes", and "It's Alright with Me". Instead, "I Remember When I Loved Her" was held over for another month, until Parrot released it as the B-side of their US-only single "I Want You Back Again" on 31 May 1965. (Note: Catalogue number Parrot 45-PAR 9769.) On the original single, the song was errorenously labelled as "Remember When I Loved Her". Despite being a B-side, "I Remember When I Loved Her" charted in its own right, reaching number 22 on Cash Box's Looking Ahead chart, and at number 18 on the Record World Singles Coming Up chart.

With "I Want You Back Again" peaking at a low number 95 on the Billboard Hot 100, Emma Stott felt that "I Remember When I Loved Her" might have constituted a more successful single A-side. In the US, the song remained unreleased on an album well into the 1980s, when it first got released on the various artists compilation album British Invasion Vol. 3 by Rhino Records on 21 November 1988. (Note: Catalogue number Rhino R2 70321.) It has since also appear on the Big Beat Records career-spanning box set Zombie Heaven, issued on 8 December 1997. (Note: Catalogue number ZOMBOX 7.) As with most of the band's output for Decca, "I Remember When I Loved Her" received its' first stereo mix in 2002, which Big Beat released as part of the 2-CD album The Decca Stereo Anthology on 4 November 2002. (Note: Catalogue number Big Beat CDWIK2 225.)

== Reception and legacy ==
The song has an immensively beautiful melody line. The track could have been a single but was relegated to Side 2 of the LP.

— Claes Johansen (2001)

According to the reviewer for Cash Box, "I Remember When I Loved Her" was a "low-down cut" that contained the "unusual orking" which had come to characterize the band. Stott characterized the track as a delicate composition that should not have been tucked away on side two of Begin Here; similarly, Johansen believed that the song was strong enough to have been released a as single, rather than appearing on an album. Ken Barnes of Phonograph Record called the song "superb" and a "memorable flip-side". For Greenwald, it represented a "perfect example of the early Zombies genius", stating that Rod Argent hardly ever "bettered himself as far as the early stages of the Zombies' career".

For Saunders, "I Remember When I Loved Her" was an "eerie ballad" that was "perfect", save for the "half-dumb ending". Olafson praised the guitar part and called the solo Argent's most "most concise and moving", labelling the song a "small work of genius" in its' "torturous" instrumental climaxes and in Blunstone's vocal performance. He believed it was a song which could "bring tears to eyes", which was "no mean feat". Mark Deming of AllMusic felt that the song, with its' "moody and atmospheric" tone, acted as a prelude to the group's "masterful final album Odessey and Oracle". Similarly, Stott opined that the "exquisite ballad"'s mood anticipated the "summer-to-early-winter-landscape" of Odessey and Oracle.

Swedish pop band Ola & the Janglers covered both "I Remember When I Loved Her" and "Leave Me Be" (1964) for their debut album Surprise, Surprise in 1965. According to Stott, vocalist Ola Håkansson matched Blunstone's "lamenting cadences almost exactly" on the Janglers rendition. Translated into Italian by Roncoroni as "Mio Amore Sta Lontano", a version sung by Angelique "haunted its' way" into multiple Romantic scenes in the British drama series Danger Man.

== Charts ==
Weekly chart performance for "I Remember When I Loved Her"
Chart (1965)	Peak position
US Cash Box Looking Ahead	22
US Record World Singles Coming Up	18

== Sources ==
- Johansen, Claes (2001). The Zombies - Hung Up on a Dream: A Biography 1962-1967. United Kingdom: SAF. ISBN 0 946719 34 9.
- Palao, Alec (1997). Zombie Heaven (Box set liner notes). United Kingdom: Big Beat. ZOMBOX 7.
- Palao, Alec (2002). The Decca Stereo Anthology (CD liner notes). United Kingdom: Big Beat. CDWIK2 225.
- Russo, Greg (2016). Time Of The Season: The Zombies Collector's Guide (4th ed.). United States: CrossFire. ISBN 978-0-9791845-9-8.
- Stott, Emma (2025). The Zombies: Every Album, Every Song. United States: SonicBond. ISBN 978-1-7895249-3-2.
