= Work 'n' Play =

1965 instrumental by the Zombies

Instrumental by the Zombies

from the album The Zombies
- Released: 8 February 1965
- Recorded: 10 December 1964
- Studio: Decca, London
- Genre: R&B; rock
- Length: 2:07
- Label: Parrot
- Songwriter: Ken Jones
- Producer: Ken Jones

Licensed audio
- "Work 'n' Play" on YouTube

"Work 'n' Play" is an instrumental song recorded by British band the Zombies. Written and produced by their recording manager Ken Jones, it was recorded at his insistence to earn additional royalties. Musically, it is an R&B and rock composition revolving around a harmonica and piano riff. Keyboardist Rod Argent plays the harmonica, and his role is substituted by Jones, who plays piano. "Work 'n' Play" initially saw release on the Zombies eponymous debut album in the US through Parrot Records on 8 February 1965. It was later included on the band's British debut album Begin Here through Decca Records on 9 April 1965. Reception of the song has been mixed, with several music critics noting it as a filler recording to pad out the band's debut album.

== Background and recording ==
I had a little chuckle there. Our producer said, "Oh, you've got to have an instrumental track on there - and I just happened to have written one!"

— Colin Blunstone (2001)

"Work 'n' Play" was recorded at Decca Studios in West Hampstead during the final recording session for what would become their debut album. Taped on 10 December 1964, the session also produced "Can't Nobody Love You", "The Way I Feel Inside", "I Got My Mojo Working", "You've Really Got a Hold on Me / Bring it on Home to Me", and "I Can't Make Up My Mind". Four takes of the track were attempted, with the final becoming the master. Production was handled by Ken Jones, with engineering done by Gus Dudgeon. According to bassist Chris White, they performed it virtually "live" in studio.

Producer Ken Jones wrote "Work 'n' Play" as a piece solely to "fill out" the album. The band agreed after Jones suggested that they needed to include an instrumental on the album for variety. White noted that this was due to Jones wanting to "get in on the act", since he owned the copyright. Similarly, biographer Emma Stott wrote that the group's members felt that this was a "ploy for a cut of the royalties". Lead vocalist Colin Blunstone felt that there "was a little bit of politics involved".

== Musical composition ==
Uniquely for a Zombies recording, "Work 'n' Play" features keyboardist Rod Argent playing harmonica, an instrument he was "new" to. Instead, the piano on the track was performed by Ken Jones. The recording opens with a fade in, which writer Alec Palao believed was "lifted" from the Beatles "Eight Days a Week" (1964). Palao opined this represented a "clear vision" for Jones' musical development, despite the short amount of time he worked on the track. Peter Olafson of Trouser Press wrote that it was a "skifflish instrumental". According to AllMusic critic Matthew Greenwald, "Work 'n' Play" was led by a "sinewy harmonica / piano riff" which let band "flex their rock and R&B" muscle". Guitarist Paul Atkinson plays a twelve-string electric guitar on the song, something Perfect Sound Forever's Martin Sharp felt shifted between "both tender and tough". He similarly characterized Chris White's playing as "both swinging and rocking".

== Release ==
"Work 'n' Play" first saw release in the US, when it was included on their eponymous debut album which Parrot Records released on 8 February 1965. On the album, the track is sequenced between "I Don't Want to Know" and "Can't Nobody Love You". In the UK, the song was first issued as part of their British debut album Begin Here, which Decca Records released on 9 April 1965. "Work 'n' Play" did not appear on most compilation albums issued by the band, but was included on the career-spanning box set Zombie Heaven, released by Big Beat Records on 8 December 1997. In 2002, "Work 'n' Play" received its first stereo mix together with the rest of their output for Decca, which Big Beat released as the 2-CD album The Decca Stereo Anthology on 4 November 2002. This release featured a previously unissued backing track for "Work 'n' Play", which in reality was the false start of the song's second take and the recording of take three merged.

== Critical reception ==
Many music critics have pointed out "Work 'n' Play" as an album filler. Despite this, Matthew Greenwald wrote that the song did "have its charms", as the musical style of the instrumental "balanced out their more melancholy ballad statements". Lindsay Planer believed that under the guidance of Argent's "fiery" harmonica performance, they turned the "proposed filler into a rock & roll killer". Similarly, Emma Stott noted Argent's harmonica performance as "spirited". Biographer Greg Russo believed that the harmonica solo and drummer Hugh Grundy's "spirited" playing lifted the track from average. Martin sharp classified the song as an "undiscovered gem" in the Zombies' discography. The reviewer for Goldmine felt that "Work 'n' Play" was not "typically Zombine", but felt that it "chugged along like a locomotive" thanks to the harmonica.

On the contrary, Metal Mike Saunders of Fusion magazine wrote that "Work 'n' Play" was a "dumb instrumental" which featured harmonica which "beat P. F. Sloan but not Keith Relf". Saunders characterized the track as "merely bad". Music critic Georgiy Starostin wrote that the he felt that "Work 'n' Play" "spills all it has to spill in the opening three bars" before leaving the listener to "assess how well Argent can blow the harmonica". Starostin characterized Argent's harmonica playing as being "no Little Walter", believing that Argent's keyboard talent was wasted on the track in favor of harmonica.

== Personnel ==
Personnel according to the liner notes of The Decca Stereo Anthology, unless otherwise noted.

The Zombies

- Rod Argent – harmonica
- Chris White – bass guitar
- Hugh Grundy – drums
- Paul Atkinson – twelve-string electric guitar

Other personnel

- Ken Jones – production, songwriting; piano
- Gus Dudgeon – recording engineer

== Sources ==
- Johansen, Claes (2001). The Zombies - Hung Up on a Dream: A Biography 1962-1967. United Kingdom: SAF. ISBN 0 946719 34 9.
- Palao, Alec (1997). Zombie Heaven (Box set liner notes). United Kingdom: Big Beat. ZOMBOX 7.
- Palao, Alec (2002). The Decca Stereo Anthology (CD liner notes). United Kingdom: Big Beat. CDWIK2 225.
- Russo, Greg (2016). Time Of The Season: The Zombies Collector's Guide (4th ed.). United States: CrossFire. ISBN 978-0-9791845-9-8.
- Stott, Emma (2025). The Zombies: Every Album, Every Song. United States: SonicBond. ISBN 978-1-7895249-3-2.
