= Begin Here =

Studio album by the Zombies
- Released: 9 April 1965
- Recorded: 12 June – 12 December 1964
- Studios: Decca, London
- Genres: Beat; R&B; pop
- Length: 33:30
- Label: Decca
- Producer: Ken Jones

The Zombies UK chronology
The Zombies (EP) (1965)	Begin Here (1965)	Odessey and Oracle (1968)

Singles from Begin Here
- 1. "She's Not There" Released: July 24, 1964

Professional ratings
Review scores
Source	Rating
Allmusic	3.5/5 stars
Record Mirror	4/5 stars

Begin Here is the debut studio album by the English rock band the Zombies, released on 9 April 1965, by Decca Records. The American version, titled The Zombies, was released three months earlier and featured many of the same tracks; however, as was common at the time, some were removed and substituted.

The 1999 CD reissue on Big Beat expands the track line-up substantially with the addition of three songs from the band's 1965 UK EP The Zombies and alternative versions of "Sticks and Stones" and "It's Alright with Me", as well as demos of "I Know She Will" and "I'll Keep Trying".

The song "The Way I Feel Inside" was used in director Wes Anderson's film The Life Aquatic and is included in the film soundtrack. It was also covered by Taron Egerton for the animated film Sing. Additionally, the song "She's Not There" as covered by Santana appears in Renny Harlin's film The Long Kiss Goodnight. The song "Can't Nobody Love You" was used in the opening of a season 4 episode of the HBO series Girls.

== Reception ==
In his retrospective review of the release, critic Mark Deming for AllMusic wrote "Given the wealth of fine original tunes that the Zombies released on various non-LP singles and EPs during this period, it's a shame that so much of Begin Here was given over to covers; it's still a fine album and certainly better than what most of their peers had to offer in 1965, but what could have been an achievement on a par with the Kinks' Face to Face or the Beatles' Rubber Soul ended up being something quite good instead of an unqualified triumph."

== Track listing ==
Side one
No.	Title	Writer(s)	Length
1.	"Road Runner"	Bo Diddley	2:06
2.	"Summertime"	George Gershwin, Ira Gershwin, DuBose Heyward	2:17
3.	"I Can't Make Up My Mind"	Chris White	2:37
4.	"The Way I Feel Inside"	Rod Argent	1:28
5.	"Work 'n' Play"	Ken Jones	2:07
6.	"You've Really Got a Hold on Me/Bring It On Home to Me"	Smokey Robinson/Sam Cooke	3:39
7.	"She's Not There"	Rod Argent	2:20

Side two
No.	Title	Writer(s)	Length
8.	"Sticks and Stones"	Henry Glover, Titus Turner	2:56
9.	"Can't Nobody Love You"	Phillip Mitchell	2:15
10.	"Woman"	Rod Argent	2:25
11.	"I Don't Want to Know"	Chris White	2:07
12.	"I Remember When I Loved Her"	Rod Argent	2:00
13.	"What More Can I Do"	Chris White	1:38
14.	"I Got My Mojo Working"	Preston Foster, McKinley Morganfield	3:35

1999 Big Beat bonus tracks
No.	Title	Writer(s)	Length
15.	"It's Alright with Me" (from January 1965 The Zombies EP)	Rod Argent	1:53
16.	"Sometimes" (from January 1965 The Zombies EP)	Rod Argent	2:05
17.	"Kind of Girl" (from January 1965 The Zombies EP)	Rod Argent	2:12
18.	"Tell Her No" (from December 1964 A-side)	Rod Argent	2:09
19.	"Sticks and Stones" (Alternate take)	Henry Glover, Titus Turner	3:08
20.	"It's Alright with Me" (Alternate take)	Rod Argent	1:55
21.	"I Know She Will" (Demo)	Rod Argent, Chris White	2:29
22.	"I'll Keep Trying" (Demo)	Rod Argent	2:19

2001 Repertoire bonus tracks
No.	Title	Writer(s)	Length
15.	"You Make Me Feel Good"	White	2:36
16.	"Leave Me Be"	White	2:06
17.	"Tell Her No"	Argent	2:05
18.	"She's Coming Home"	Argent	2:33
19.	"I Must Move"	White	1:55
20.	"Kind of Girl"	Argent	2:09
21.	"It's Alright With Me"	Argent	1:49
22.	"Sometimes"	Argent	2:03
23.	"Whenever You're Ready"	Argent	2:42
24.	"I Love You"	White	3:20
25.	"Is This the Dream"	Argent	2:42
26.	"Don't Go Away"	White	2:33
27.	"Remember You"	White	1:57
28.	"Just Out Of Reach"	Colin Blunstone	2:06
29.	"Indication"	Argent	3:00
30.	"How We Were Before"	Blunstone	2:04
31.	"I'm Going Home"	Acker Bilk, Paul Mares	1:49

== Personnel ==
The Zombies

- Colin Blunstone – lead vocals, tambourine, guitar
- Rod Argent – keyboards, backing, vocals, lead vocals on "I Got My Mojo Working", harmonica on "Work 'n' Play" and "I Got My Mojo Working"
- Paul Atkinson – guitar
- Chris White – bass, backing vocals
- Hugh Grundy – drums

Additional personnel

- Ken Jones – piano on "Work 'n' Play", tambourine on "I Remember When I Loved Her"
- Dezo Hoffmann – cover photography
