= How We Were Before =

- UK single B-side

Single by the Zombies
- A-side: "Indication"
- Released: 17 June 1966
- Recorded: 8 July 1965
- Studio: Decca, London
- Genre: Calypso; chamber folk
- Length: 2:06
- Label: Decca
- Songwriter: Colin Blunstone
- Producer: Ken Jones

The Zombies UK singles chronology
| "Remember You" (1966) | "Indication" / "How We Were Before" (1966) | "Gotta Get a Hold of Myself" (1966) |

The Zombies US singles chronology
| "Is This the Dream" (1966) | "Indication" / "How We Were Before" (1966) | "Care of Cell 44" (1967) |

Audio
- "How We Were Before" on YouTube

"How We Were Before" is a song written by vocalist Colin Blunstone and recorded by his band the Zombies in 1966. It was the first song he wrote, and one of only two Blunstone compositions that the band recorded during the 1960s. Largely an acoustic number, the song's sparse arrangement has been classified as chamber folk or calypso. Musically, it is guitar-based with an arrangement influenced by the Beatles. The Zombies recorded "How We Were Before" on 8 July 1965 at Decca Studios in London with Ken Jones producing.

Decca Records kept "How We Were Before" in its vaults for nearly a year before issuing it as the B-side of their single "Indication", which was released in the UK on 17 June 1966 and the US on 15 July 1966. It failed to chart. "How We Were Before" has since been included on various compilation albums, including Zombie Heaven (1997). In 2002, it received its first stereo mix. The song received primarily good reviews, with critics praising both the song's composition and vocal performance, albeit some derided it as "dated". Blunstone has since recorded a solo version of the song, and it has been covered by the Pietasters.

== Composition and recording ==
In contrast to the majority of the Zombies original material, which was penned by either keyboardist Rod Argent or bassist Chris White, "How We Were Before" was one of only two songs lead vocalist Colin Blunstone wrote for the band during the 1960s. (Note: The other being "Just Out of Reach", which was issued as a single through Parrot Records in the US in October 1965.) In retrospective interviews with Blunstone, he has claimed that "How We Were Before" was the first composition he wrote. Blunstone wrote the track at 27 Cumberland Court in Hatfield, Hertfordshire, where he lived in a flat together with his parents. Regarding his songwriting, Rod Argent opined that Blunstone was influenced by Argent's royalty payments generated by the hits "She's Not There" and "Tell Her No" (both 1964), as the band were being "ripped off pretty badly at that time".

As recorded by the Zombies, "How We Were Before" was a largely "acoustic number", which featured drum brushwork by Hugh Grundy. The song's sparse arrangement has been noted; Pitchfork's Eric Harvey described it as a "lush and dreamy ballad", whereas Rachel Stone from BroadwayWorld opined it was a chamber folk track. On the contrary, Peter Olafson of the Trouser Press wrote that it was a calypso. The song features a guitar solo by Paul Atkinson, something Spencer Leigh commented on, opining that it was "unusual to hear guitars on the fore" on Zombies recordings. Matthew Greenwald of AllMusic felt that it "echoed" the works of Argent and White in its melancholy. Several critics have noted a Beatles influence on the track. Greenwald felt the track was more akin "graceful Paul McCartney or Brian Wilson", a sentiment shared by biographer Emma Stott, who believed the arrangement owed to the Beatles' versions of "Till There Was You" and "And I Love Her". Leigh similarly wrote that it had "shades" of "And I Love Her".

Following a two-day engagement in Paris, the Zombies returned to England to put down five new tracks for Decca Records on 8 July 1965. These were Chris White's "I Love You", "Don't Cry For Me", "I Know She Will", Argent's "If It Don't Work Out" and Blunstone's "How We Were Before". The session was held at Decca Studios in West Hampstead, London, and the tracks were produced by Ken Jones with engineering by Gus Dudgeon. Six takes of "How We Were Before" were attempted, with the final becoming the master.

== Releases ==
Though recorded in July 1965, Decca kept "How We Were Before" in its vaults until they released it as the B-side of the Argent-penned "Indication" in the UK on 17 June 1966. (Note: Catalogue number Decca F12426.) Biographer Alec Palao believed the inclusion of "How We Were Before" on the single suggested that the Zombies were not "paying too many visits to the studio in 1966". A US release of the single followed on 15 July 1966 through Parrot Records. (Note: Catalogue number Parrot 45-3004.) Neither side of the single managed to chart in the US or the UK.

Since original release, "How We Were Before" has been included on multiple compilations albums and re-issues by the Zombies. It was first issued as part of an eponymous compilation album which Decca released exclusively in Sweden, the Netherlands and Japan on 9 December 1966. (Note: Catalogue number Decca LK 4843.) Its first release on a UK album was on the Decca compilation Rock Roots on 21 May 1976. (Note: Catalogue number Decca ROOTS 2.) In the US, "How We Were Before" would not receive album release until The Zombies compilation album was reissued on CD by Varèse Sarabande on 22 June 2004. (Note: Catalogue number Varèse Sarabande 302 066 568 2.) It was also featured on the career-spanning box set Zombie Heaven, released through Big Beat Records on 8 December 1997. (Note: Catalogue number Big Beat ZOMBOX 7.) In 2002, "How We Were Before", together with most of their Decca catalogue, received a stereo mix for the first time. This version was released on The Decca Stereo Anthology by Big Beat on 4 November 2002. (Note: Catalogue number Big Beat CDWIK2 225.)

== Reception and legacy ==
The others used to pull my leg. There's a bit [in "How We Were Before"] that goes 'dum-dum, da-dum'. Everytime it goes around it ends like that. And they always sang "God Save the Queen" when that bit came around. I was really a bit precious about this song, and of course they knew that and they pulled my leg.

— Colin Blunstone (2001)

The staff reviewer for Cash Box wrote that "How We Were Before" was a "soft, easy paced ditty". Emma Stott noted the song as a "beautifully romantic track guaranteed to raise a smile", praising Paul Atkinson's guitar playing as "gentle" and Colin Blunstone's vocal as "sweetly pure". Spencer Leigh classified it as "very nice". Matthew Greenwald wrote that the song was an "excellent" representative of Blunstone's "early compositional ability", and that it quoted a lot of" pop clichés without sounding trite", something he crowned an achievement for a "man who wasn't considered a songwriter". Similarly, AllMusic's Richie Unterberger listed "How We Were Before" as ranking amongst the Zombies' "finest work".

Other reviewers have described the track as a key part of the Zombies' musical development; according to Rachel Stone, "How We Were Before" was one of the Zombies' earlier tracks which showed "the way to Odessey and Oracle". Similarly, Alec Palao wrote that the song bore some "Beatles-ish hallmarks" that would eventually become "trademarks of many of his later compositions". On the contrary, Far Out magazine's Kelly Murph argued that the song was dated, compared to its A-side "Indication". Band biographer Claes Johansen agreed, feeling that it "didn't quite measure up to the other material" recorded on 8 July 1965, even though it was a "fine little tune".

Colin Blunstone was "precious" about "How We Were Before", and recorded a solo version of the track, together with piano from Rod Argent. This was released on his solo album Greatest Hits Plus on 13 November 2006. (Note: Catalogue number Mystic MYS CD 194.) In 2002, "How We Were Before" was recorded by The Pietasters for their album Turbo. The Pietasters version of the song was slowed down and arranged in a ska style. AllMusic's Dean Carlson called it a closer to one of the band's "smartest, sweetest, lightest records". Similarly, the reviewer of PunkNews felt that it was a "pleasant" track and that, alongside the album track "Trust Yourself", "could have worked as an album closer".
