= The Zombies (EP) =

EP by the Zombies
- Released: 29 January 1965
- Recorded: 12 June – 5 September 1964
- Studios: Decca, London
- Genres: Jazz; rhythm and blues
- Length: 8:16
- Label: Decca
- Producer: Ken Jones

The Zombies UK chronology
The Zombies (1965)	Begin Here (1965)

The Zombies is the debut extended play by British band the Zombies. It was released in the UK by Decca Records on 29 January 1965 to tie in with the release of their third British single "Tell Her No". The EP was recorded over the span of three sessions between June and September 1964 at Decca Studios with Ken Jones producing. Musically, it contains mainly original compositions by Rod Argent in a rhythm and blues and jazz style, and was also the first release of their rendition of the standard "Summertime", which had won a contest in which they were awarded a recording contract.

Upon original release, The Zombies became a chart failure and "sunk without trace", leading the Zombies to realize that their audience laid primarily in North America. In the US, two of the tracks were issued on their debut American album The Zombies in February 1965. The EP received positive reviews upon release, though retrospective criticism of the EP has been mixed, with a primary focus on "Kind of Girl" and "Sometimes" as weak tracks. In addition to "Summertime" appearing on their debut British album Begin Here in April 1965, the other tracks have also been re-issued on various compilation albums.

== Recording and composition ==
"Kind of Girl", "It's Alright With Me" and "Summertime" had already been recorded as a demo on 29 April 1964 in a local studio in Rickmansworth. Producer Ken Jones had encouraged Rod Argent to compose his own songs, and was impressed with their rendition of "Summertime" from the opera Porgy and Bess. After signing a recording contract with Jones, he secured them a contract with Decca Records and the band recorded their first professional session with him as a producer on 12 June 1964. This first session completed a studio versions of "It's Alright With Me" in six takes, (Note: "It's Alright with Me" carried the working title of "Hole in My Bucket", but switched to "It's Alright". The "with Me" suffix was added to avoid confusion with the song by the Impression carrying the same title.) and "Summertime" in nine takes, the latter of which was slated by Decca to be released as the band's debut single. (Note: The release was blocked by Ken Jones, who instead felt "She's Not There" was more suited to become their debut single, a song also recorded during the 12 June session together with "You Make Me Feel Good".) "Kind of Girl" and "Sometimes" had their backing tracks recorded on 31 August, (Note: "Kind of Girl" was completed in eight takes, whereas "Sometimes" was spliced together from six different takes as the introduction differed from the rest of the song, resulting in the "countoff between the two parts" being eliminated.) and were complemented with vocal overdubs on 5 September. (Note: The same principle was applied to "Leave Me Be" and "Woman", the A- and B-sides of their second British single on 16 October 1964. These two songs had been recorded at the same 31 August and 5 September sessions as the EP tracks.)

Side one opens with "Kind of Girl", which according to Greg Russo was "smartly arranged" and featured backing vocals by Argent that worked "just as well". "Sometimes" opens with an a cappella vocal introduction before turning into a "basic" song in a "rhythm-and-blues mode", and features call and response vocals throughout. The chords, which alternate between the key of D, key of G major, and G minor, band biographer Claes Johansen noted was a "trademark of the group", as were the shifts between two major keys and three semitones.

Side two opens with "It's Alright With Me", which according to Claes Johansen was a standard R&B tune in a "Ray Charles mold", but contains a "surprising shift in tempo" in the bridge, something he describes as "jazzy". "It's Alright with Me" was allegedly one of the first songs Argent composed. "Summertime" was the sole track on the EP not written by Argent. The band were introduced to the song through bassist Chris White, who had performed it in a prior band, and was the song which won the Zombies the Heat of the Herts Beat Contest on 5 April 1964 which in turn awarded the band a contract with Decca. Their rendition was influenced by jazz, and is in 6/8 time owing to inspirations from Miles Davis, and whom Argent was a big fan of. Argent performs a lengthy solo on his hohner pianet on the track.

== Release and reception ==
Decca released The Zombies as an EP on 29 January 1965, (Note: Greg Russo identifies the EP's release date as 20 November 1964. Catalogue number Decca DFE 8598.) which tied in with the release of their third British single "Tell Her No". According to Russo, January 1965 was a "slow month for the Zombies", though they appeared on Saturday Club, Ready Steady Go!, Thank Your Lucky Stars and Top Gear in late January and early February to promote the releases. However, the EP "sunk without a trace" and failed to chart on the Record Retailer's EP chart whereas "Tell Her No" had only peaked at number 42 on the singles chart, which Johansen believed made it clear that "the Zombies audience were mainly to be found on the other side of the Atlantic". In the US, where EPs were relatively uncommon, "Sometimes", "It's Alright With Me" and "Summertime", together with the "Tell Her No" single, made up the bulk of their American debut album The Zombies, released on 8 February 1965 through Parrot Records. (Note: Catalogue number PA 61001 (mono), PAS 61001 (simulated stereo))

Writing for the New Musical Express, Allen Evans considers the EP to be "driving, forceful r-and-b", noting the beat and praising the vocals as "imaginative", further stating Blunstone's vocal performance to be wistful. Similarly, the reviewer for the Wellington Journal gave the release a positive review, stating that they "recommended the EP" and praised their rendition of "Summertime". Retrospectively, it has been less positively received, with Johansen stating that neither "Kind of Girl" or "Sometimes" were among the "strongest performances the band ever delivered on record. According to Chris White, everything they recorded was used, and that Ken Jones "never liked to throw things away", suggesting that things like "Kind of Girl" could have "been done a lot better". "Summertime" received critical acclaim, with Lindsay Planer of AllMusic considering their version to be the "definitive a version as has appeared in the pre-Janis Joplin rock and roll era".

The Zombies was the band's only EP released in Britain, and the track "Summertime" was later included on their debut album in Britain, Begin Here released on 9 April 1965. (Note: Catalogue number Decca LK 4697.) Though the tracks were issued on various compilation albums throughout the 1970s and 1980s, including The World of the Zombies (1970) and Time of the Zombies (1973), the first time all four tracks were re-issued on the same album was in Collection Vol. 1, a compilation album released on 17 April 1989. "Kind of Girl", "Sometimes", and "It's Alright with Me" have since appeared as bonus tracks on CD re-issues of Begin Here in 1992, 1999, and 2011. In addition, the demo versions of "Summertime", "Kind of Girl", and early takes of "Sometimes" were released on the box set Zombie Heaven in 1997.

== Track listing ==
All tracks are written by Rod Argent, except "Summertime" written by George and Ira Gershwin and DuBose Heyward. Track lengths taken from the 2011 re-issue of Begin Here.

Side one:

1. "Kind of Girl" – 2:08
2. "Sometimes" – 2:03

Side two:

1. "It’s Alright with Me" – 1:50
2. "Summertime" – 2:15
