= Leave Me Be =

1964 single by the Zombies

Single by the Zombies
- A-side: "Tell Her No" (US)
- B-side: "Woman" (UK)
- Released: 16 October 1964
- Recorded: 31 August and 5 September 1964
- Studio: Decca, London
- Genre: Soft rock; jazz rock
- Length: 2:05
- Label: Decca (UK); Parrot (US)
- Songwriter: Chris White
- Producer: Ken Jones

The Zombies UK singles chronology
"She's Not There" (1964)	"Leave Me Be" (1964)	"Tell Her No" (1965)

The Zombies US singles chronology
"She's Not There" (1964)	"Tell Her No" / "Leave Me Be" (1964)	"She's Coming Home" (1965)

Audio sample
- Original UK version: file; help

"Leave Me Be" (also recorded as "You'd Better Leave Me Be") is a song by the English rock band the Zombies. Written by Chris White, the band's bass guitarist, "Leave Me Be" was released on a non-album single in October 1964. Following the release of the band's debut single "She's Not There" in July 1964, White wrote a handful of songs in between performances during the band's heavy schedule. Most of the work on the song occurred in August 1964, when the Zombies recorded both a demo and the backing track for it. The instrumentation largely differs from both earlier and later Zombies records; it features electric organ played by Rod Argent, compared to his previous usage of the electric piano. Together with record producer Ken Jones, they returned in September to finish the vocal track, which was disliked by most band members for its similarity to "She's Not There"; the vocals would eventually be re-recorded a few months later.

Decca Records released the song as the follow-up to "She's Not There". Characterized by its usage of minor chords and chord progression, the song lyrically deals with loneliness, a theme previously present in the band's music. The United States release was cancelled and instead, the song appeared as the B-side of "Tell Her No" in the US. The song received mixed reviews upon release, with some critics deeming it inferior to "She's Not There". Unlike its predecessor, which was a top-20 hit in the United Kingdom, "Leave Me Be" became a commercial failure due to flopping worldwide, only gracing the lower regions of the Australian charts. First appearing on the compilation album I Love You in 1966, the song has since been re-released on several occasions. Although largely ignored and forgotten after release, the song has received retrospective praise, becoming a cult song among fans. It has been covered by several notable artists, including Ola & the Janglers, Sonny & Cher and the Posies.

== Background and composition ==
=== Background and recording ===
On 24 July 1964, the Zombies released their debut single "She's Not There" in the United Kingdom. (Note: Catalogue number Decca F11940.) It proved to be a relatively large hit there, reaching number 12 on the Record Retailer chart. Being among the first songs written by keyboardist Rod Argent, the track largely established him as a songwriter. Chris White had composed the B-side "You Make Me Feel Good", which despite being positively reviewed sparsely, was largely ignored. This was due to it being a B-side, a side that contained songs that the British press and record-buying public oftentimes ignored. This meant that Argent, who wrote the A-side, received the majority of the acclaim from both fans and critics alike. During this time, as their popularity was growing, the Zombies managed to gain more bookings and as a result, less and less time could be wasted writing songs as the hectic schedule proved to be time-consuming. This largely led to White starting to write songs as a substitute to Argent. In July–August 1964 during the chart success of "She's Not There", he wrote an entire batch of songs intended for single and album release.

"Leave Me Be" was initially recorded as a demo at Ryemuse Studios in London on 13 August 1964, together with Argent's "Kind of Girl" and "Woman". This version wasn't released for over 30 years, and instead the group entered Decca Studios in West Hampstead, London on 31 August 1964 to professionally lay down the backing track to the song. Producer Ken Jones who had previously collaborated with them was also present during the session. Both "Kind of Girl" and "Woman" were also recorded during this session, along with another of Argent's compositions "Sometimes". The group performed eight takes of the song during that session. They then didn't finish the song for another 6 days, until 5 September 1964, once again returning to Decca for recording the vocal track. This continued the Zombies style of recording, which included recording several takes of the backing track on a prior date sometime prior, before choosing the best to overdub and add the vocal track over. Jones, who liked the "whispery" singing on "She's Not There", wanted singer Colin Blunstone to have a similar vocal performance on "Leave Me Be", much to Blunstone's and the Zombies' disappointment. This led to the group re-recording the vocals during a chapter of their first United States tour.

=== Composition ===
The Zombies in 1966. With the song's composer, Chris White, to the far left.

In the months leading up to the recording session, the Zombies had equipped themselves with several new instruments. Drummer Hugh Grundy had purchased a Ludwig drum kit, with White buying a Gibson EB-3, two instruments that would dominate the remainder of the group's output on Decca Records. For the recording, guitarist Paul Atkinson had equipped himself with a Gretsch Chet Atkins semi-acoustic guitar, an instrument he did not like, in hindsight wishing he had purchased a Gretsch Country Gentleman, played by George Harrison. However, author Claes Johansen praises Atkinson for his work on the song, writing that his playing "elevates it to another level." "Leave Me Be" also marked the first instance the Vox Continental organ appeared on a Zombies Record. Previously, Argent had played a Hohner Pianet on the group's recordings. Johansen however, stated that due to the way the Vox Continental was built, (Note: According to Claes Johansen, the Vox Continental only has a good sound if the Vibrato drawbar had been pulled. This meant that playing solos on the instrument required chords rather than individual notes to be held down, something that Argent did not do during the session.) Argent was "in the dark" when using the keyboard, which in Johansens words "would have probably been a better option at the time if he had just stayed with the Pianette."

According to Johansen, "Leave Me Be" features several distinct features that connect it to "She's Not There" musically. Both songs are in the key of A minor along with the "incorporation of both D minor and D major chords. Further similarities to "She's Not There" can according to Johansen be found in the song structure, as both songs contain "three part structures" of verses "leading into an inner bridge leading into the chorus". These liknesses are most likely coincidental, as White claims he is musically illiterate. When interviewed, White stated that "something comes in my head and then I have to find it on instrument". Johansen also adds that the song is unlike White's regular songwriting since he uses an odd chord progression on it, as the chord of A-minor does not appear until the conclusion, while also using the unusual F major 7 chord. The author states that White used the tonic scale on the song in order to give comfort to the listener. He also indicates that this use of a chord progression will not leave the listener "unoccupied until the last note". Lyrically, "Leave Me Be" refers to despair and hopelessness which was also a theme found on "She's Not There". Matthew Greenwald of AllMusic called the song a "minor-key ballad", and Johansen compares it to the soft and jazz rock that was present on "She's Not There".

== Release and commercial performance ==
Although recorded during August–September 1964, Decca kept "Leave Me Be" in its vaults until October. This was most likely to allow for a US-release of "She's Not There", which occurred only a few days after the vocal track for "Leave Me Be" was finished, on 7 September through Parrot Records. (Note: Catalogue number Parrot 45-9695.) The song proved to be a huge chart success, reaching number two on the Billboard Hot 100 and number one on the Cashbox Top 100. As "She's Not There" was more successful in the United States than in the UK, Decca decided to release "Leave Me Be" in the latter territory in order to see whether it would become a hit or not. Therefore, on 16 October 1964, Decca released "Leave Me Be" as the Zombies' second single. (Note: Catalogue number Decca F12004.) The B-side chosen was Argent's "Woman", which had been recorded during the same sessions as the A-side.

Demo version of "Leave Me Be"
The demo version of the song, which Alec Palao stated "is probably closer to what the band wanted the single to be"

Unlike "She's Not There", which had reached the UK top-20, "Leave Me Be" failed to chart in Record Retailer. The reason behind this is unknown, but at the time of the single's release, "She's Not There" was still in the top-20, which meant that the two singles competed with each other, significantly reducing sales for "Leave Me Be" since record-buyers wanted the hit instead. "Leave Me Be" was issued in several other territories, including Australia, which was the only country in which the song actually landed on the national charts, Kent Music Report. The song entered the chart on 12 December 1964, at a position of number 81, which it held for two weeks before dropping out on 19 December 1964. The failure of the single led to it being withdrawn from US release and instead being relegated to the B-side of the Zombies' follow up "Tell Her No". (Note: Catalogue number Parrot 45-9723.) This version features alternate vocals that were recorded during their US tour. According to White, the reason behind the disappointing chart success of "Leave Me Be" was that the song didn't have the same aura when recorded in the studio as it did during live performances. He claims that it was a fantastic track during rehearsals and on tour, but that the "produced sound" on the studio version most likely hindered further chart success.

"Leave Me Be" was not included on any original UK album releases, however, the B-side "Woman" was included on the band's debut UK album Begin Here. (1965) (Note: Catalogue number Decca LK 4679.) Although "Woman" was also included on the Zombies eponymous US album, (1965) (Note: Catalogue number Parrot PA 61001.) "Leave Me Be" was left out. The song experienced its first album release on a Swedish compilation album known as I Love You in 1966. (Note: Catalogue number Decca LK 4843.) It was first issued in the US four years after the initial release, on a compilation album titled Early Days, which compiled several early recordings by the band. (Note: Catalogue number London PS 557.) The song would not get a release on an album in the UK until 1973, when it was issued on Time Of The Zombies, which compiled all their 1964–66 recordings. The initial demo version was released on Zombie Heaven in 1997. Furthermore, both the stereo version and the backing track were issued in 2002 on the compilation album The Decca Stereo Anthology.

== Critical reception and legacy ==
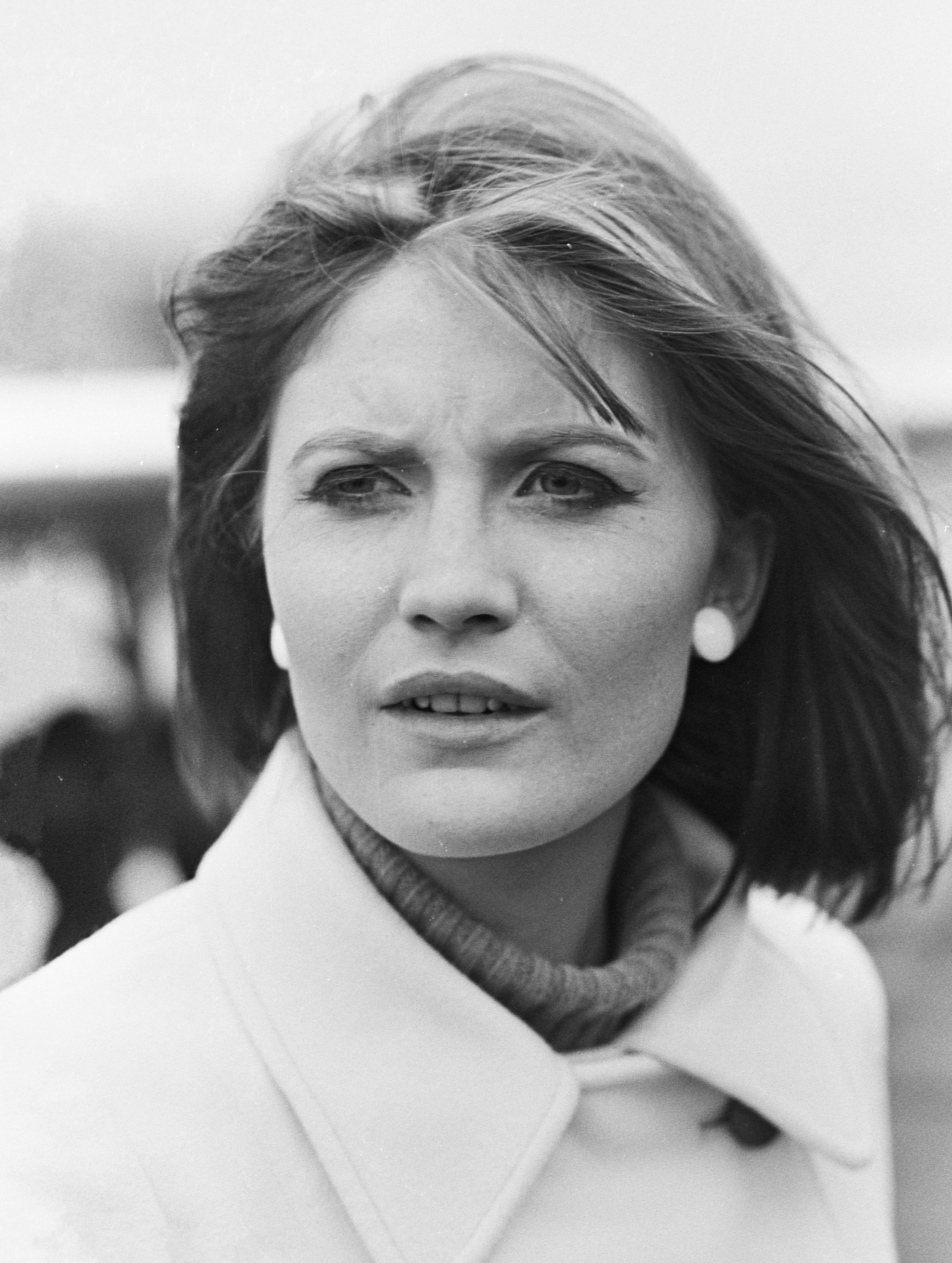
Sandie Shaw had a mixed opinion about the single.

=== Contemporary reviews ===
Although not a commercially successful single, "Leave Me Be" managed to garner some positive reception. In a review for Disc and Music Echo, critic Don Nicholl writes that "Leave Me Be" seems to be self-pitying, though "it should register another hit". He notes the "soft beat" contrasting to the "orchestrated power of Colin Blunstone's vocals", further praising Argent's organ playing. Nicholl ends by stating that he prefers "Woman" due to the A-side being "too wistful". In a blind test for Melody Maker, musician Sandie Shaw states that she likes the sound of the song's introduction and almost immediately recognized it to be the Zombies. She enjoys the mysterious sound that the band established, however, deems the song inferior to "She's Not There". Shaw says it had a chance of reaching the charts, but not to the extent of their debut single.

Peter Aldersley of Pop Weekly states that he likes the song, due to the "haunting fascination springing from the melody and the vocal". Furthermore, Aldersley adds that the single is balanced and seems restrained in a positive way. He adds that the song is dance friendly and concludes that it is an "uncomplicated performance of a straightforward composition. In an anonymous review for Record Mirror, the single is described as a "a gentle medium pace ballad with some good soft vocal work". They also state that the vocals and guitar most likely will become better with each time listening, and compare the sound to that of "She's Not There".

As "Leave Me Be" was issued as a B-side in the US, it was largely ignored by the media. However, it did receive some reviews in American newspapers. Writing for Cashbox, the reviewer states that "Leave Me Be" is "whisper-like" which offers "a pleasant melody and meaningful lyrics." Though they note that both sides of the single had commercial potential, "Tell Her No" was eventually considered the superior song. According to Music Business, "Leave Me Be" proved the Zombies a "staying power", stating that it is a strong song. In Record World, it was called a "frenzy to sing", with the coupling being awarded four-stars.

=== Retrospective assessment and covers ===
Retrospectively, Matthew Greenwald of AllMusic considered "Leave Me Be" to be among White's earlier songwriting masterpieces. He compared it to the music of the Beach Boys and positively notes the self-referencial lyrical content that "was probably deeply felt by every heartbroken teenager that ever heard it". The single became a favorite of guitarist John Du Cann of Atomic Rooster, who stated he enjoyed both the inclusion of minor chords and Blunstone's phrasing on the song, leading to him getting a copy of it signed during a Zombies concert. Vernon Joynson writes that "Leave Me Be" has a "muffled, surly feel", while Dafydd Rees and Luke Crampton compared the song to "She's Not There", lacking a hook that would have made it more commercial.

The options of the Zombies members have stayed the same as they did during the time "Leave Me Be" was released. White still insists that the song was stronger on stage than on record and states his dislike for the vocal track. Argent has similarly expressed dismay regarding the vocal performance, stating that whereas on "She's Not There", the performance seemed natural which was the complete contrast to "Leave Me Be", which he believed had forcefully achieved this effect. He closed by stating that "You Make Me Feel Good" had a sound that they should have attempted on "Leave Me Be". However, engineer Gus Dudgeon stated that this was an attempt to ensure commercial success, as many follow-ups to debuts had a similar arrangement to the originals. "Leave Me Be" eventually achieved something similar to a cult status among the Zombies' fans, due to its chord progression, lyrical relevance and relative obscurity. Though not a commercially successful record upon release, the song managed to be covered by several artists only 1–2 years after initial release.

The song was initially covered by Swedish beat group Ola & the Janglers in 1965 for their debut album Surprise Surprise. Self-proclaimed Zombies fans, the group also included "I Remember When I Loved Her" on the album, while a cover of "She's Not There" was their breakthrough hit. Based on the Janglers version, "Leave Me Be" was picked up by Kenneth "Kenta" Gustafsson and Gustav "Stoffe" Svensson, which was later featured in the Swedish cult film They Call Us Misfits in 1968. In April 1966, Timothy B. Schmit's first band the New Breed covered it as "You'd Better Leave Me Be." Sonny & Cher recorded a cover for their second studio album The Wondrous World of Sonny & Chér in May 1966. Critic Richie Unterberger praised their ability to find "eclectic" songs to cover, while simultaneously praising their versions. American group the Posies covered the song for the compilation album The World of the Zombies. AllMusic critic Nitsuh Abebe called the song "charming".

== Personnel ==
Personnel according to the liner notes of Zombie Heaven.

- Colin Blunstone – lead vocals
- Rod Argent – keyboards, backing vocals
- Paul Atkinson – guitar
- Chris White – bass guitar, backing vocals
- Hugh Grundy – drums

== Charts ==
Chart performance for "Leave Me Be"
Chart (1964–1965)	Peak position
Australia (Kent Music Report)	81

== Sources ==
- Johansen, Claes (2001). The Zombies: Hung Up on a Dream: a Biography – 1962–1967. SAF Publishing. ISBN 978-094-671-93-41.
- Palao, Alec (1997). Zombie Heaven (CD sleeve notes). Big Beat Records.
- Roberts, David (2006). British Hit Singles & Albums (19th ed.). Guinness World Records Limited. ISBN 1-904994-10-5.
- Russo, Greg (1999). Time of the Season: The Zombies Collector's Guide. Crossfire Publications. ISBN 978-096-481-57-59.
- Hoffman, Frank (1983). The Cash Box Singles Charts, 1950-1981. The Scarecrow Press. ISBN 978-081-081-59-57.
- Kent, David (2005). Australian Chart Book 1940 - 1969. Australian Chart Book Pty Ltd. ISBN 978-064-644-43-90.
