= Zombie Heaven =

Box set by The Zombies
- Released: 18 November 1997
- Genres: Rock, pop
- Length: 4:59:29
- Label: Big Beat Records

Professional ratings
Review scores
Source	Rating
AllMusic	4.5/5 stars
Uncut	2/5 stars

Zombie Heaven is a 1997 four-disc box set comprising roughly the entire catalog of British Invasion band The Zombies. The first disc comprises their debut Begin Here and assorted singles. The second disc features their second album Odessey and Oracle and the unreleased album R.I.P.. Disc 3 is composed of rare and unissued recordings, including demos, alternate takes, EP tracks, and R.I.P. tracks without the additional instrumentation, while the fourth disc collects live recordings from the band's appearance on the BBC.

The accompanying 64-page booklet by producer Alec Palao features interviews with the original band members and associated friends and engineers, as well as a brief history of each song in the set and a timeline featuring nearly every Zombies tour date.

== Track listing ==
=== Disc 1 ===
Begin Here & Singles
No.	Title	Original release	Length
1.	"She's Not There" (Note: Track one is preceded by a hidden bonus track (Track 0) that features a false start of "She's Not There" (under its original title, "Nobody Told Me").)	Begin Here
2.	"You Make Me Feel Good"	B-side of "She's Not There"
3.	"Leave Me Be"	1964 non-album single
4.	"Woman"	B-side of "Leave Me Be", Begin Here
5.	"Tell Her No"	1964 non-album single
6.	"What More Can I Do"	B-side of "Tell Her No", Begin Here
7.	"Road Runner"	Begin Here
8.	"Summertime"	Begin Here
9.	"I Can't Make Up My Mind"	Begin Here
10.	"The Way I Feel Inside"	Begin Here
11.	"Work 'n' Play"	Begin Here
12.	"You've Really Got a Hold on Me/Bring It On Home to Me"	Begin Here
13.	"Sticks and Stones"	Begin Here
14.	"Can't Nobody Love You"	Begin Here
15.	"I Don't Want to Know"	Begin Here
16.	"I Remember When I Loved Her"	Begin Here
17.	"I Got My Mojo Working"	Begin Here
18.	"She's Coming Home"	1965 non-album single
19.	"I Must Move"	B-side of "She's Coming Home"
20.	"I Want You Back Again"	1965 non-album single
21.	"Whenever You're Ready"	1965 non-album single
22.	"I Love You"	B-side of "Whenever You're Ready"
23.	"Is This the Dream"	1965 non-album single
24.	"Don't Go Away"	B-side of "Is This the Dream"
25.	"Remember You"	B-side of "Just out of Reach"
26.	"Just Out of Reach"	1965 non-album single
27.	"Indication"	1966 non-album single
28.	"How We Were Before"	B-side of "Indication"
29.	"Gotta Get a Hold of Myself"	1966 non-album single
30.	"Goin' Out of My Head"	1967 non-album single
31.	"She Does Everything for Me"	B-side of "Goin' Out of My Head"

=== Disc 2 ===
Odessey and Oracle & The Lost Album
No.	Title	Original release	Length
1.	"Care of Cell 44"	Odessey and Oracle
2.	"A Rose for Emily"	Odessey and Oracle
3.	"Maybe After He's Gone"	Odessey and Oracle
4.	"Beechwood Park"	Odessey and Oracle
5.	"Brief Candles"	Odessey and Oracle
6.	"Hung Up on a Dream"	Odessey and Oracle
7.	"Changes"	Odessey and Oracle
8.	"I Want Her, She Wants Me"	Odessey and Oracle
9.	"This Will Be Our Year"	Odessey and Oracle
10.	"Butcher's Tale (Western Front 1914)"	Odessey and Oracle
11.	"Friends of Mine"	Odessey and Oracle
12.	"Time of the Season"	Odessey and Oracle
13.	"I'll Call You Mine"	B-side of "Time of the Season", Time of the Zombies
14.	"Imagine the Swan"	1969 non-album single, Time of the Zombies
15.	"Conversation off Floral Street"	B-side of "Imagine the Swan"
16.	"If It Don't Work Out"	1969 non-album single, Time of the Zombies
17.	"Don't Cry for Me"	B-side of "If It Don't Work Out", Time of the Zombies
18.	"I Know She Will"	Time of the Zombies
19.	"Walking in the Sun"	Time of the Zombies
20.	"I'll Keep Trying"	The Best and the Rest of the Zombies
21.	"I'll Call You Mine" (Alternate version with piano and vocal overdubs added)	Time of the Zombies
22.	"Smokey Day"	Time of the Zombies
23.	"She Loves the Way They Love Her"	Time of the Zombies
24.	"Girl Help Me"	The Best and the Rest of the Zombies
25.	"I Could Spend the Day"	The Best and the Rest of the Zombies
26.	"A Rose for Emily" (Alternate version)	Previously unreleased
27.	"This Will Be Our Year" (Stereo)	Previously unreleased
28.	"Time of the Season" (US radio spot)	Previously unreleased

=== Disc 3 ===
In the Studio
No.	Title	Original release	Length
1.	"Summertime" (Demo)	Previously unreleased
2.	"Woman" (Demo)	Previously unreleased
3.	"Kind of Girl" (Demo)	Previously unreleased
4.	"Leave Me Be" (Demo)	Previously unreleased
5.	"I'm Going Home" (Alternate takes)	Previously unreleased
6.	"I'm Going Home"	Previously unreleased
7.	"Sometimes" (False starts)	Previously unreleased
8.	"Sometimes"	The Zombies
9.	"It's Alright With Me"	The Zombies
10.	"Kind of Girl"	The Zombies
11.	"Walking in the Sun" (Undubbed)	Previously unreleased
12.	"The Way I Feel Inside" (False start)	Previously unreleased
13.	"The Way I Feel Inside" (Rehearsal)	Previously unreleased
14.	"I Want You Back Again" (Alternate version)	Previously unreleased
15.	"Nothing's Changed" (Backing track)	Previously unreleased
16.	"Nothing's Changed"	Bunny Lake is Missing soundtrack
17.	"Remember You"	Bunny Lake is Missing soundtrack
18.	"Come On Time"	Previously unreleased
19.	"I'll Keep Trying" (Undubbed)	Previously unreleased
20.	"Whenever You're Ready" (Demo)	Previously unreleased
21.	"You'll Go From Me" (a.k.a. "Don't Go Away", demo)	Previously unreleased
22.	"I Know She Will" (Undubbed)	Previously unreleased
23.	"Don't Cry for Me" (Undubbed)	Previously unreleased
24.	"If It Don't Work Out" (Undubbed)	Previously unreleased
25.	"One Day I'll Say Goodbye" (Home demo)	Previously unreleased
26.	"I Don't Want to Worry" (Home demo)	Previously unreleased
27.	"A Love That Never Was" (Demo)	Previously unreleased
28.	"Call of the Night" (a.k.a. "Girl Help Me", demo)	Previously unreleased
29.	"Out of the Day" (Demo)	Previously unreleased
30.	"This Will Be Our Year" (Demo)	Previously unreleased
31.	"Bunny Lake Is Missing promo spot"	Previously unreleased

=== Disc 4 ===
Live on the BBC (all tracks previously unreleased)
No.	Title	Length
1.	"Road Runner"
2.	"You Make Me Feel Good"
3.	"Early One Morning"
4.	"She's Not There"
5.	"Tell Her No"
6.	"What More Can I Do"
7.	"I'm Going Home"
8.	"For You My Love"
9.	"Tell Her No"
10.	"Soulville"
11.	"Rip It Up"
12.	"Can't Nobody Love You"
13.	"You Must Believe Me"
14.	"She's Coming Home"
15.	"I Must Move"
16.	"Just Out of Reach"
17.	"If It Don't Work Out"
18.	"Whenever You're Ready"
19.	"It's All Right"
20.	"Will You Love Me Tomorrow"
21.	"When the Lovelight Starts Shining Through Her Eyes"
22.	"Just a Little Bit"
23.	"Sitting in the Park"
24.	"Gotta Get a Hold of Myself"
25.	"Goin' Out of My Head"
26.	"This Old Heart of Mine"
27.	"Friends of Mine"
28.	"The Look of Love"
29.	"Kenny Everett Show jingle"
