= The Zombies (album) =

Studio album by the Zombies
- Released: 8 February 1965
- Recorded: 12 June – 12 December 1964
- Studios: Decca, London
- Genres: Beat; R&B; pop
- Length: 28:34
- Label: Parrot
- Producers: Ken Jones, Rod Argent

The Zombies US chronology
The Zombies (1965)	Odessey and Oracle (1968)

Singles from The Zombies
- 1. "She's Not There" Released: October 1964; 2. "Tell Her No" Released: December 1964

Professional ratings
Review scores
Source	Rating
AllMusic	4/5 stars

The Zombies (subtitled Featuring She's Not There Tell Her No [sic]) is the first studio album released by the English rock band the Zombies in the United States. It was released on 8 February 1965 by Parrot Records. After the success of the double-sided hit single "She's Not There" b/w "You Make Me Feel Good" reached #2 on the U.S. charts in the fall of 1964, Parrot quickly released this LP in 1965 (PA 61001). The dozen tracks were taken from material the Zombies cut for their UK debut album, Begin Here. Also included are "It's Alright With Me" and "Sometimes" from their self-titled EP. The album also included their 2nd hit single "Tell Her No".

== Content ==
According to writer Greg Russo, The Zombies was as typical as "most US LPs of British bands", in that the album's content were compiled from various sources without a standalone UK equivalent. Headlining the album were the two single A-sides "She's Not There" and "Tell Her No", both of which had been top-ten singles in the US. "Summertime", "It's Alright With Me" and "Sometimes" were all culled from the Zombies eponymous EP, which had been issued on 29 January 1965 in the UK. (Note: "Summertime" was later also released on Begin Here.) "Woman" and "What More Can I Do" had originally appeared as the B-sides of the Zombies British singles "Leave Me Be" and "Tell Her No" on 16 October 1964 and 29 January 1965 respectively. Despite the compilationary nature of the album, five of its tracks ("You've Really Got a Hold on Me" / "Bring It On Home to Me", "I Don't Want To Know", "Work 'n' Play", "Can't Nobody Love You" and "I Got My Mojo Working") were unreleased in the UK until Begin Here was issued on 9 April 1965.

== Reception ==
In his retrospective review of the release, critic Lindsay Planer for AllMusic wrote "The Zombies' obvious appreciation for adeptly crafted melodies and rich vocal harmonies likewise made them favorites of pop fans as well as more discerning listeners."

== Track listing ==
All songs written by Rod Argent, unless otherwise noted. Track lengths taken from the 2011 re-issue of Begin Here.

Side one

1. "She's Not There" – 2:23
2. "Summertime" (George Gershwin, Ira Gershwin, DuBose Heyward) – 2:15
3. "It's Alright With Me" – 1:50
4. "You've Really Got a Hold on Me" / "Bring It On Home to Me" (Smokey Robinson, Sam Cooke) – 3:37
5. "Sometimes" – 2:03
6. "Woman" – 2:25

Side two

1. "Tell Her No" – 2:05
2. "I Don't Want To Know" (Chris White) – 2:04
3. "Work 'n' Play" (Ken Jones) – 2:04
4. "Can't Nobody Love You" (James Mitchell) – 2:13
5. "What More Can I Do" (White) – 2:02
6. "I Got My Mojo Working" (Preston Foster) – 3:33

== Personnel ==
The Zombies

- Colin Blunstone - lead vocals and backing vocals, guitar, tambourine
- Chris White - bass and backing vocals
- Paul Atkinson - electric guitar
- Rod Argent - lead vocals and backing vocals, electric piano and organ
- Hugh Grundy - drums

== Charts ==
Weekly chart performance for The Zombies
Chart (1965)	Peak position
US Billboard Top LP's	39
US Cash Box Top 100 Albums	36
US Record World Top 100 LP's	39
