= Is This the Dream =

1965 single by the Zombies

- Swedish single sleeve

Single by the Zombies
- B-side: "Don't Go Away"
- Released: 26 November 1965
- Recorded: 10 November 1965
- Studio: Decca, London
- Genre: R&B, soul
- Length: 3:07
- Label: Decca
- Songwriter: Rod Argent
- Producer: Ken Jones

The Zombies UK singles chronology
"Whenever You're Ready" (1965)	"Is This the Dream" (1965)	"Remember You" (1966)

The Zombies US singles chronology
"Just Out of Reach" (1965)	"Is This the Dream" (1966)	"Indication" (1966)

Audio
- "Is This the Dream" on YouTube

"Is This the Dream" is a song written by British keyboardist Rod Argent, and recorded by his band the Zombies in 1965. Written in a more aggressive sound than their previous singles, the song derives influences from American Motown recordings, with an arrangement heavily centered around drummer Hugh Grundy's performance. Recorded at Decca Studios in London on 10 November 1965 with production by Ken Jones, the Zombies were not present at the single's mixing and expressed dissatisfaction upon hearing the final mix. "Is This the Dream" was released by Decca Records in the UK on 26 November 1965 and in the US on 28 February 1966 through Parrot Records. The B-side was "Don't Go Away", written by the band's bassist Chris White.

Though promoted in the UK by Argent and performed on television shows, "Is This the Dream" failed to chart in both the UK and US. In Sweden, "Is This the Dream" was the Zombies only top-ten single, reaching number three on Tio i Topp during February 1966. The single has since appeared on several compilation albums by the Zombies, including the box set Zombie Heaven. In 2002, "Is This the Dream" received its first stereo mix, featuring a new tambourine overdub by Hugh Grundy. The single received critical praise in both the British and American music press, with praise primarily being directed towards the song's musical backing and beat. It also received praise by other musicians, including George Harrison of the Beatles and Pete Townshend of the Who. Retrospective assessment has also favoured the song.

== Composition and recording ==
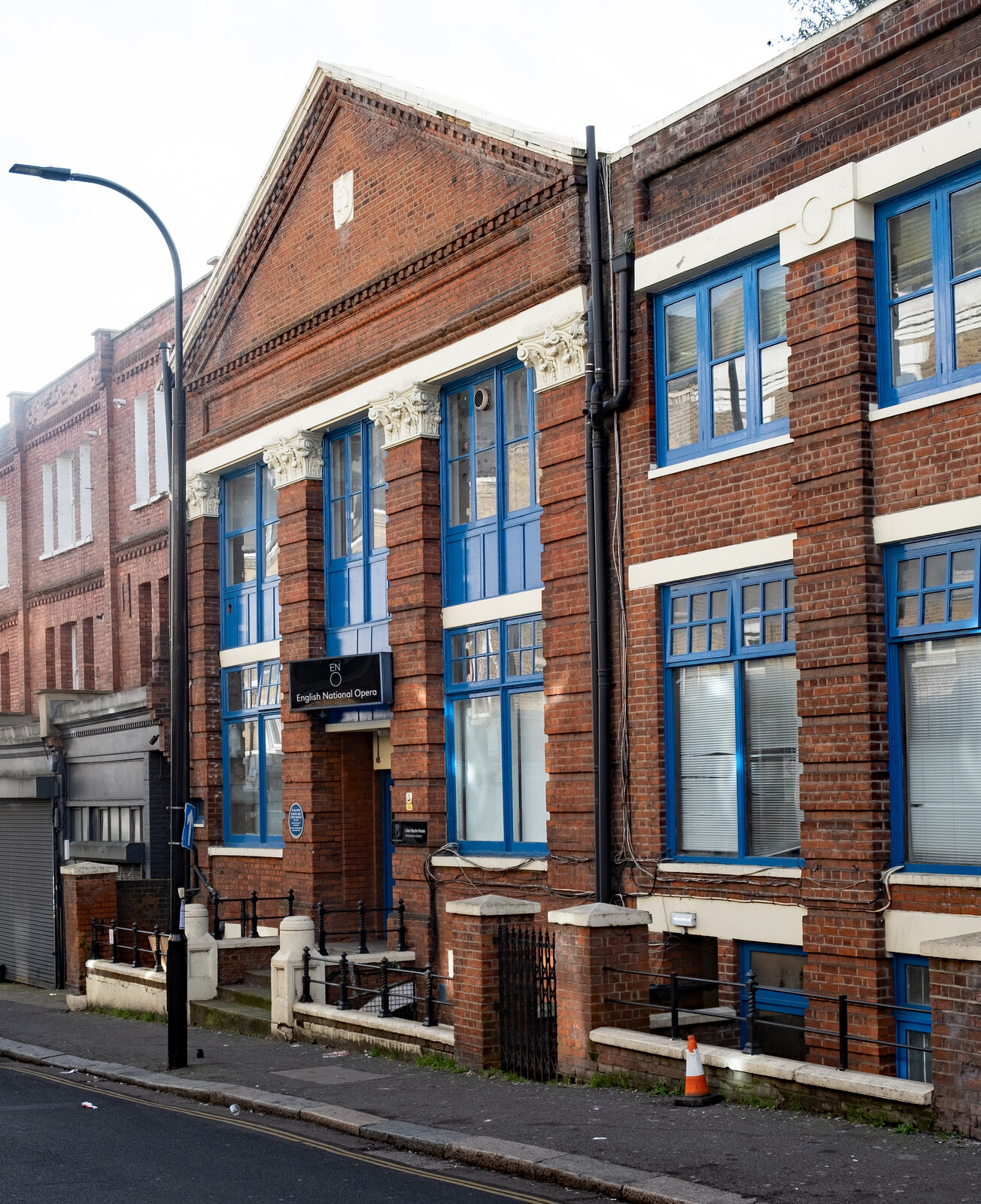
"Is This the Dream" was recorded at Decca Studios in London.

As with four of the Zombies prior single A-sides in the United Kingdom, "Is This the Dream" was penned by keyboardist Rod Argent. In contrast to their earlier recordings, "Is This the Dream" represented a more "aggressive" style of music. Several music journalists have noted the apparent influenced from Motown; according to Spencer Leigh, the song "was as close to Tamla-Motown as a British group could get". Biographer Alec Palao believes that the song's dynamics were in large part driven by drummer Hugh Grundy's "forceful, jackhammer beat", as did Greg Russo who felt his drumming and Chris White's "looping bass runs were fine matches" for Colin Blunstone's lead vocal. He further opined that it was "quite unusual" for an Argent song to "rely on guitar". For the song, Argent added a keyboard solo which he admitted was improvised in the studio.

Amidst a busy schedule that included both live gigs and television performances, the Zombies were booked into Decca Studios in West Hampstead, London, to record "Is This the Dream". The Zombies recorded it in ten takes, with the final becoming the master. It was the sole song recorded during that session, which Russo commented on as "unusual". The song's backing vocals and tambourine were overdubbed directly onto the mono master during mixdown, and are as a result missing from subsequent stereo of the song. (Note: When a stereo mix for the song was created for the 2002 compilation The Decca Stereo Anthology, drummer Hugh Grundy was brought into Argent's Red House Studios on 14 August 2002 to record a new tambourine overdub for "Is This the Dream".) "Is This the Dream" became the final song by the group to be recorded at Decca Studios. (Note: The Zombies' remaining output for Decca were either recorded at the independently operated Lansdowne Studios or Kingsway Recording Studios in London.)

Production of the song was handled by Ken Jones and, which had become common standard for the group, he asked the Zombies to leave the studio when mixing the track. This came at a tense moment for band. According to Blunstone, he and Argent went to a pub up the road "for a couple of hours", and upon returning to Decca Studios didn't recognize the track. Argent believed that the band had expected "Is This the Dream" to sound "meatier than it did", whereas Blunstoned argued that he believed Jones' had played him a "very early take" or demo of the song. Argent opined that the band became hung up on the production, as they wanted it "in their mind's eyes" to be as "good as it could be" and tended to "discount" what they ended up with. (Note: When asked about going back and remixing the song's multitrack tapes together with Rod Argent, bassist Chris White expressed reluctance, feeling that "these things were of their time" and that they "should not be meddled with afterwards".)

== Release and commercial performance ==
Decca Records released "Is This the Dream" as a single in the UK on 26 November 1965. (Note: Catalogue number Decca F12296.) In the press, Argent promoted the single by calling it the "most earthy sound the quintet has produced". Despite a December 1965 appearance on the Five O'Clock Club, failed to chart. In the US, the release was held-up as their US label Parrot Records had just released the single "Just Out of Reach" in October 1965. There, "Is This the Dream" was issued on 28 February 1966, and similarly failed to chart. (Note: Catalogue number Parrot 45 PAR 9821.) The B-side of the single in both territories was "Don't Go Away", a Chris White composition sporting a "friendly yet unusual" chord progression. Fuelled by a six-day tour there in mid-November 1965, "Is This the Dream" became the Zombies only top-ten single in Sweden, where it entered the Tio i Topp chart on 29 January 1966, peaking at number three on 12 February. It spent five weeks on the chart.

Regarding the single's commercial qualities, Argent spoke that he was "worried about" its chart success, as the change of sound was different to their previous material and was wondering how it would "affect us [The Zombies] abroad". The Zombies also recorded "Is This the Dream" at the Paris Theatre on 8 January 1966, in a version that aired on BBC Radio's Easy Beat the following day. During the spring of 1966, they were filmed lip syncing both sides of the single, a taping which aired in the US on Where the Action Is on 5 May 1966. Fuelled largely by the single's success in Sweden, "Is This the Dream" received its first album released on the Swedish-only album I Love You, a compilation featuring several non-album tracks which Decca issued on 9 December 1966. (Note: Catalogue number Decca LK 4843.) "Is This the Dream" has since appeared on multiple compilations by the Zombies, including Time of the Zombies by Epic Records on 23 November 1973, (Note: Catalogue number Epic EPC 68262.) and the Big Beat Records box set Zombie Heaven on 8 December 1997. (Note: Catalogue number Big Beat ZOMBOX7.) The song received its first stereo mix in 2002, in a version which appeared on Big Beat Records' The Decca Stereo Anthology in 2002. (Note: Catalogue number Big Beat CDWIK2 225.)

== Reception and retrospective assessment ==
"We wouldn't have been able to materially alter the balances, but they did occasionally ask us back to the control room, because they added things like the backing vocals in the mix. Ken [Jones] had a point, because when you're mixing, you can't mix by committee, but we didn't understand that then. I do remember George Harrison reviewing the single in Disc or Melody Maker and saying something like, 'I can't understand why they're not being successful at the moment'."

— Rod Argent (1997)

Upon release, "Is This the Dream" received favourable reviews in the British music press; writing for Disc Weekly, journalist Penny Valentine felt that if the single "wouldn't get the highly-tailored group" into the British charts, she didn't know "what would". She combared the song's tambourine and "super backing" to Martha and the Vandellas' contemporary single "Nowhere to Run". Derek Johnson of the New Musical Express opined that the drum opening set the mood for the track, which he characterized as a "wild mid-tempo shaker". He felt that Blunstone's lead vocal performance was "raving", something that was helped on by the backing vocalists, who also contributed to some "unison passages". He praised Grundy's work as maintaining a "tremendous beat" that generated "excitement all the way along the line". Johnson closed his review by opining that it was the Zombies best single "in some time", but felt pity there was "so much competition around now".

In Record Mirror, Norman Jopling and Peter Jones wrote that "Is This the Dream" was a "rather wild performance" which "could easily hit the charts". They felt that the single built in a dynamic way and with an "easy tempo", praising the band's instrumentation on the track. Amongst US reviewers, the staff for Billboard identified "Is This the Dream" as an ""emotional wailer with exciting dance beat" that featured a "big production" that they felt would "rush the group back to the top of the charts". In Cash Box, the reviewer wrote that the single was a "hard-driving, rhythmic blues-drenched"-track which featured lyrics about "a guy who can’t understand why his girl friend is crying". They opined it had "loads of potential" and that the Zombies could "quickly get back in their previous money-making ways on the charts" with it.

The track's most significant praise, according to Argent, came from the Beatles guitarist George Harrison. In a blinded experiment for Melody Maker, Harrison identified the song as being from the Zombies, admitting that he had "a soft spot" for the group, and that identifying the track as a Zombies composition was "a good thing". He specifically liked Argent's electric piano performance; opining that it was "quite commercial". Harrison felt that with the right promotion, it could make the top-20 or top-30 of the singles chart, though believed it was not going to be a big hit. Similarly the Who's guitarist Pete Townshend was a fan of the track, specifically directing praise to the "quirkiness" of Argent's solo. Retrospectively, Spencer Leigh opined that it featured one of Blunstone's "toughest" vocal performances. Biographer Claes Johansen wrote that listeners had "found much pleasure" in "Is This the Dream" for decades, opining that he did not believe it was a "bad slice of 7" vinyl by any means", despite the group's objections. Comparing the mono to stereo versions of the song, both Greg Russo and Alec Palao favoured the mono recording, opining that the backing vocals only found on the mono recording were an "essential song element".

== Charts ==
Weekly chart performance for "Is This the Dream"
Chart (1966)	Peak position
Sweden (Tio i Topp)	3
