= Hugh Grundy =

English musician (born 1945)

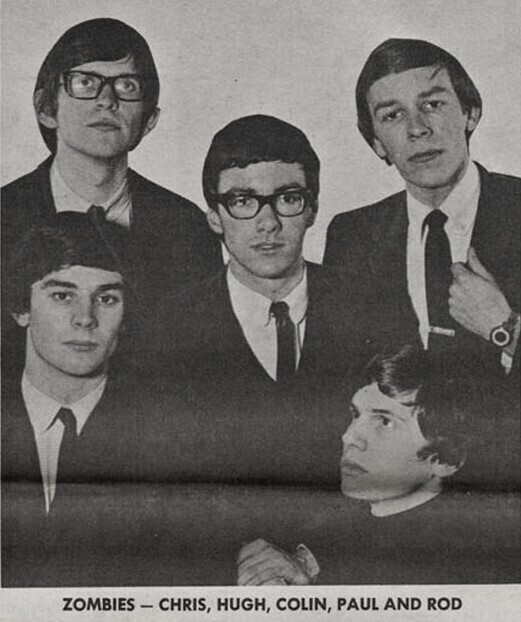
- Grundy as part of the Zombies in 1965

Background information
- Born: Hugh Birch Grundy; 6 March 1945 (age 81); Winchester, Hampshire, England
- Genres: Rock; pop
- Occupations: Musician; A&R
- Instruments: Drums; percussion
- Years active: 1958–present
- Formerly of: The Zombies

Hugh Birch Grundy (born 6 March 1945) is an English musician. In a career spanning more than 50 years, Grundy came to prominence in the mid 1960s as the drummer of the English rock band the Zombies. He was inducted into the Rock and Roll Hall of Fame in 2019.

== Early years ==
Hugh Grundy was born in Winchester, Hampshire, England, to Ted and Aileen Grundy. The family moved to Hatfield, Hertfordshire, where Ted worked at the De Havilland factory as an aircraft inspector and metallurgist; he was also an amateur violinist. Aileen was a secretary at the police headquarters in Welwyn Garden City. Grundy's middle name, Birch, was his paternal grandmother's maiden name. His first drum was made by his father at work during his off-hours.

While attending St Albans School in Hertfordshire, he met Paul Atkinson, and Rod Argent. Argent, Atkinson and Grundy first played together at a jam on Easter 1961 in St Albans, Hertfordshire.

== The Zombies ==
Argent wanted to form a band and Colin Blunstone and Paul Arnold joined Argent, Grundy, and Atkinson in early 1961, while all five members were still at school. Grundy's parents supported his interest in the band as a pastime, but encouraged him to enter banking; he remained with Barclays for around a year, as the band's reputation grew, at which stage his parents acknowledged the viability of a career in music. His mother helped to establish, and ran, the band's fan club. Arnold left not long afterwards and was replaced by Chris White. The band started life as the Mustangs, but after discovering other bands using the name, they changed it to the Zombies. After the band won a local contest, they recorded a demo as their prize. Argent's song "She's Not There" got them a recording contract with Decca. An album, Begin Here (renamed to The Zombies when released in the US) would follow. They would appear on American television for the first time on January 12 1965, when they appeared on the first episode of Hullabaloo.

The Zombies would have another chart-topper in 1964 with "Tell Her No". The group continued to record successfully, but disbanded in December 1967, reportedly over management disagreements. A second album was released in 1968 titled Odessey and Oracle, which featured the song "Time of the Season", one of the Zombies' most successful singles, along with "She’s Not There".

In 1990, Blunstone, Grundy, and White briefly reunited as the Zombies with keyboardist and guitarist Sebastian Santa Maria to record the studio album New World (1991). To mark the 40th anniversary of the album Odessey and Oracle, the four surviving original members of the Zombies participated in a three-night series of concerts at London's Shepherd's Bush Empire Theatre between 7 and 9 March 2008.

Together with the other three Zombies, Grundy performed a few songs when the band was inducted into the Rock and Roll Hall of Fame on 29 March, 2019.

While Grundy is not a member of The Zombies’ current lineup, he has rejoined the group on several tours featuring the surviving original lineup between 2008 and 2019 to play Odessey and Oracle in its entirety.

== Later life ==
After the band's break-up, Grundy went to work as an A&R man for Columbia Records. In the 1980s, Grundy also operated a horse-transport business in England and worked as a professional driver.

== Discography ==
=== The Zombies ===
==== Studio albums ====
- Begin Here (UK) / The Zombies (US) (1965)
- Odessey and Oracle (1968)
- The Return of the Zombies (1990)/New World (1991)
- Still Got That Hunger (2015)
- Different Game (2023)

==== EPs ====
- The Zombies (1964)

==== Singles ====
Title	Year	Peak chart positions						Certifications	Album (A-side only)
Title	Year	UK	AUS	CAN	NL	US Billboard	US Cashbox	Certifications	Album (A-side only)
"She's Not There" b/w "You Make Me Feel Good"	1964	12	11	2	—	2	1		Begin Here / The Zombies
"Leave Me Be" b/w "Woman"	1964	—	81	—	—	—	—		Non album single
"Tell Her No" UK & AUS b/w "What More Can I Do?" US & CAN b/w "Leave Me Be"	1964	42	60	6	—	6	6		The Zombies
"She's Coming Home" b/w "I Must Move"	1965	—	—	21	—	58	48		Non album singles
"I Want You Back Again" b/w "I Remember When I Loved Her"	1965	—	—	—	—	95	92 / 122		Non album singles
"Whenever You're Ready" b/w "I Love You"	1965	—	—	—	—	110	114		Non album singles
"Just Out of Reach" b/w "Remember You"	1965	—	—	—	—	113	110		Non album singles
"Is This the Dream?" b/w "Don't Go Away"	1966	—	—	—	—	—	—		Non album singles
"Indication" b/w "How We Were Before"	1966	—	—	—	—	—	—		Non album singles
"Gotta Get a Hold of Myself" b/w "The Way I Feel Inside"	1966	—	—	—	—	—	—		Non album singles
"Goin' Out of My Head" b/w "She Does Everything for Me"	1967	—	—	—	—	—	—		Non album singles
"Friends of Mine" b/w "Beechwood Park"	1967	—	—	—	—	—	—		Odessey and Oracle
"Care of Cell 44" b/w "Maybe After He's Gone"	1967	—	—	—	—	—	—		Odessey and Oracle
"Time of the Season" b/w "I'll Call You Mine" b/w "Friends of Mine" (1969 US re-release)	1968	—	43	1	14	3	1	BPI: Silver; RIAA: Gold	Odessey and Oracle
"I Love You" b/w "The Way I Feel Inside"	1968	—	—	—	—	—	—		Non album single
"Butcher's Tale (Western Front 1914)" b/w "This Will Be Our Year"	1968	—	—	—	—	—	—		Odessey and Oracle
"Imagine the Swan" b/w "Conversation Off Floral Street"	1969	—	—	59	—	109	77		Non album singles
"If It Don't Work Out" b/w "Don't Cry For Me"	1969	—	—	—	—	—	—		Non album singles
"Dropped Reeling & Stupid"	2023	—	—	—	—	—	—		Different Game (scheduled for release March 2023)
"—" denotes singles that did not chart or were not released in that region.
