= Gibson EB-3 =

Electric bass guitar

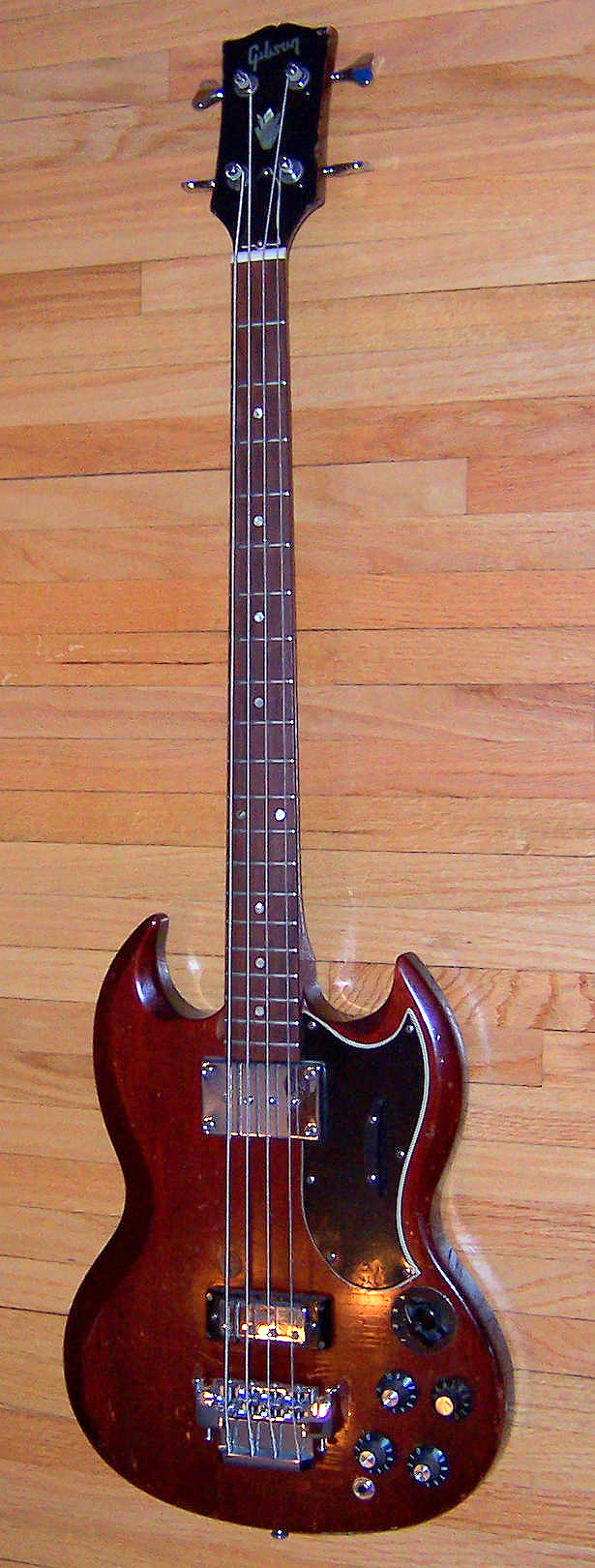
- A 1967 Gibson EB-3
- Manufacturer: Gibson Guitar Corporation
- Period: 1961—1979

Construction
- Body type: Solid
- Neck joint: Set
- Scale: 30.5" or 34" (EB-3L)

Woods
- Body: Mahogany, rarely walnut
- Neck: Mahogany (1961-72), maple (1973-1979), walnut (1974)
- Fretboard: Rosewood

Hardware
- Bridge: 2-point solid bar, 2-point with saddles, 3-point with saddles. (The bridge on the pictured model is a non-Gibson replacement.)
- Pickup(s): 1 humbucker (neck), 1 mini-humbucker (bridge)

Colors available
- "Heritage Cherry". Also available in Pelham Blue, Polaris White, Ebony and Walnut/Natural on custom-order.

The Gibson EB-3 is an electric bass guitar model produced by the Gibson Guitar Corporation.

== Origins and history ==
The Gibson EB-3 is a bass guitar introduced in 1961 and discontinued in 1979. It was produced at Gibson's plant in Kalamazoo, MI. It features a slim SG-style body, a short 30.5" scale, and two pickups (a large humbucking pickup in the neck position and a mini-humbucker pickup in the bridge position). The electronics include a four-way rotary pickup selector switch (for Series 1 basses: neck pickup with midrange notch, bridge, bridge and neck with low end rolled off neck pickup, neck pickup with choke), and volume and tone knobs for each pickup. The standard finish was cherry red (like the SG guitar models), though EB-3s were also produced in other finishes such as Polaris White, Pelham Blue, Walnut, and Ebony. By the time production ceased in 1979, a total of 14,167 instruments had been built.

The design of the EB-3 changed several times during the 1960s. In 1962, the black plastic cover on the neck pickup was replaced by a metal one. Around 1964–65, the nickel-plated hardware was replaced by chrome-plated. Around mid-1965, the wide control spacing from the early 1960s was reduced, giving all SG guitars and basses the same size and shape control cavity. Around 1966-67 the neck was replaced with a thinner one; the solid metal bar bridge was replaced by one with an adjustable nylon saddle for each string; the string guard was removed; a bridge guard was introduced and the knobs were replaced with the witch-hat design. From 1969 until 1971, the headstock was replaced with a slotted one (similar to those on most classical guitars), with tuning keys extending at ninety degrees behind the stock. In 1972, the neck pickup was moved closer to the bridge, and maple with added volute instead of mahogany was used for the neck. From 1972, a 3-point bridge was used. In addition to the Gibson EB-3, a long-scale (34") model called the EB-3L was introduced in 1969 for players who preferred the longer scale of most Fender basses. The EB-3L long-scale variant was discontinued in 1972, and the EB-3 itself in 1979.

From the late 1980s until 1998, Gibson cooperated with Epiphone in Japan to produce for the Japanese market an EB-3 under the brand Orville by Gibson.

Gibson currently produces a bass guitar called the SG Standard which appears similar to the EB-3, but with a single master tone control and no Varitone switch. In addition, the SG's neck pickup is a regular TB+ humbucker which has a more trebly tone than the EB-3's heavily wound "mudbucker"

Epiphone produced a more affordable EB-3 with a 34" scale (similar to the EB-3L), but the Varitone switch has been replaced by a simple pickup selector. This version, along with the Epiphone EB-0, was discontinued in early 2020, when the whole Epiphone lineup was changed.

== Notable EB-3 players ==
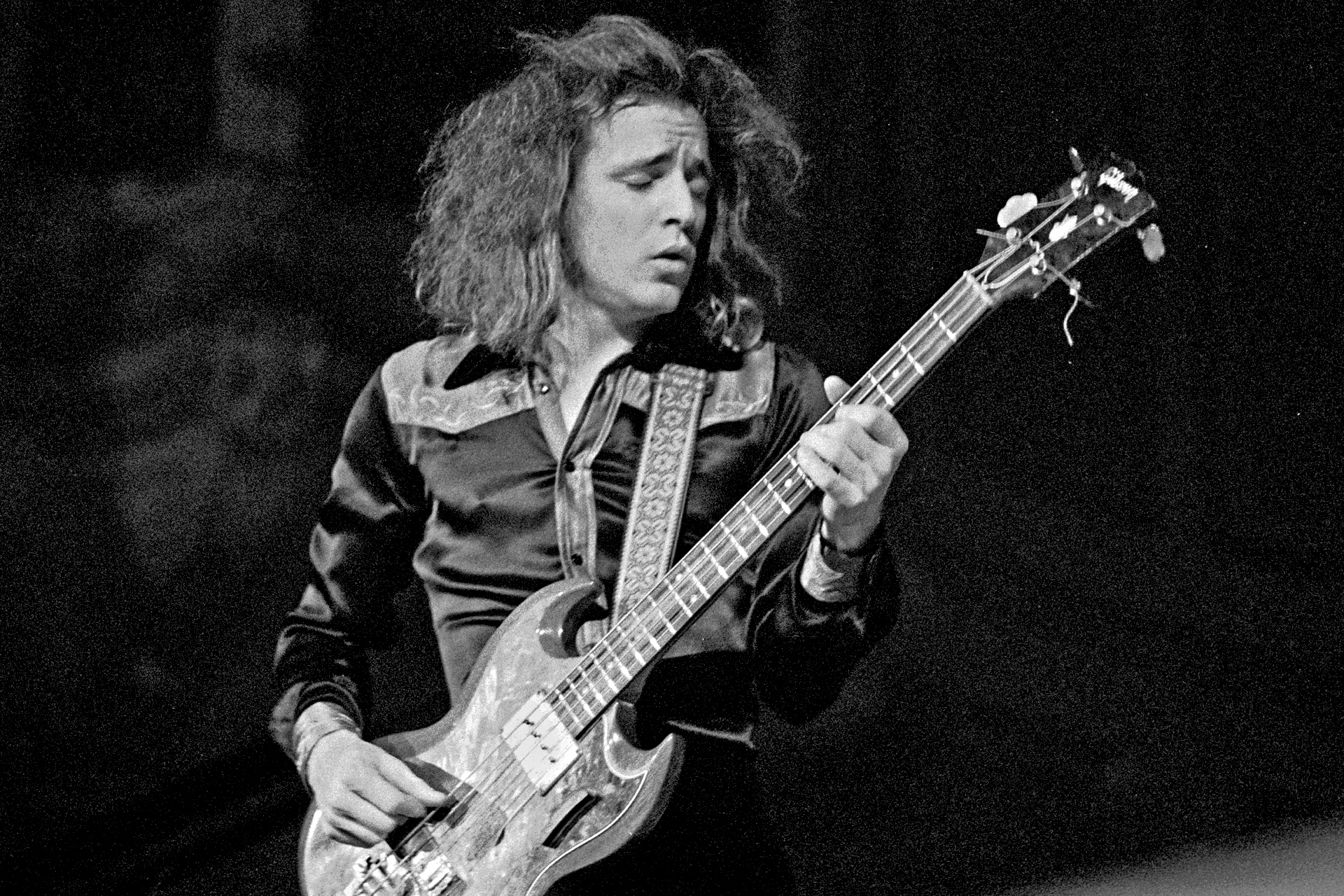
Jack Bruce with an EB3 Bass in concert

- Trevor Bolder played an EB-3 with David Bowie's Spiders from Mars band in the early 1970s.
- Jack Bruce switched from a Fender Bass VI to an EB-3 before the recording of Cream's Disraeli Gears (1967).
- Glenn Cornick played an EB-3 for most of his last two years with Jethro Tull (1969–70).
- Bob Daisley played a white EB-3 on Ozzy Osbourne's Blizzard of Ozz (1980) and on many other albums.
- Jared Followill of the Southern rock band Kings of Leon used a Gibson EB-3 on the album Aha Shake Heartbreak before switching over to a Gibson Thunderbird bass.
- Andy Fraser of Free also played an EB-3.
- Rik Fox
- Rinus Gerritsen of the Dutch progressive rock band Golden Earring used an EB-3 on their 1973 hit "Radar Love".
- Jermaine Jackson (of the Jackson 5)
- Jim Lea played an EB-3 in Slade during their most successful period in the early 1970s.
- Pete Quaife of The Kinks sometimes used an EB-3 from May 1966 until his departure from the group in April 1969 along with a Rickenbacker 4001. His replacement, John Dalton also played the EB-3.
- Mike Watt of Minutemen and fIREHOSE plays a heavily modified ’69 Gibson EB-3.
- Chris White of The Zombies played an EB-3 as well.
- Bill Wyman of The Rolling Stones favored an EB-3 together with an Ampeg Dan Armstrong Plexiglas bass for most of The Rolling Stones Pacific Tour 1973, and an EB-3 for the entire The Rolling Stones European Tour 1973.
- Doug Yule played an EB-3 in The Velvet Underground.
- John Plaskett of Sacksville Rhythm and Blues Band plays a 1970 EB3-L
