= Ola & the Janglers =

Swedish pop group

- Origin: Sweden
- Genres: Beat; psychedelic pop
- Years active: 1960s

Ola & the Janglers were a Swedish pop group, founded in Stockholm, Sweden in 1962. Its lead member was Ola Håkansson.

Guitarist Claes "Clabbe" af Geijerstam wrote many of their hits. He was later a member of the duo Nova (Swedish name "Malta") with Göran Fristorp. The duo won the Swedish part of the Eurovision in 1973. (ABBA was number 3 with "Ring Ring". Clabbe was also a program leader and later worked on ABBA's tours.

Among the hits they scored in their native country were "She's Not There", "No, No, No" (1965), "Love Was on Your Mind", "Poetry in Motion", "Alex Is the Man" (1966), "I'm Thinking of You" (1965), "Strolling Along", and "Runaway" (1968). The group's 1969 hit "Let's Dance", a cover of the Chris Montez song, reached #92 on the Billboard Hot 100. They scored a minor hit with the Jagger/Richards composition "Surprise, Surprise" in 1968. Ola & the Janglers recorded three singles for the Italian market: "Questo è un addio", "Le mele verdi" and "Albarosa", the last two for Adriano Celentano's label Clan Celentano.

== Members ==
- Ola Håkansson (vocals)
- Christer Idering (guitar)
- Johnny Lundin (guitar)
- Claes "Clabbe" af Geijerstam (guitar)
- Johannes Olsson (organ)
- Lennart Gudmundsson (bass)
- Åke Eldsäter (bass)
- Leif Johansson (drums)
