= Fusion (music magazine) =

Former American music magazine

Fusion: The Magazine of Rock Music, Culture, and Politics
- Co-editor: Ted Scourtis; Robert Somma
- Categories: Music magazine
- Frequency: Bi-weekly
- Founder: Barry Glovsky; Ted Scourtis
- First issue: 1967; 59 years ago
- Final issue: 1974; 52 years ago
- Company: Quality Stuff, Inc.
- Country: United States
- Based in: Boston
- Language: English
- ISSN: 0016-3163
- OCLC: 1781254

Fusion was an American music magazine that was based in Boston, Massachusetts, and operated from 1967 to 1974. According to the music journalism archive Rock's Backpages, it was an "influential" publication during that time. It formed out of the teen-oriented publication New England Teen Scene and, along with Crawdaddy! and Rolling Stone, was one of the first US magazines to recognize and critique the increased sophistication of pop music from the mid 1960s onward.

The magazine's co-editor was Ted Scourtis until 1970. Three years later, it was edited by Robert Somma and published by Quality Stuff, Inc. According to the magazine's advertising in July 1972, it was based at 909 Beacon Street in Boston.

Among the writers whose work appeared in Fusion are the following: Ben Edmonds, Loyd Grossman, Lenny Kaye, Danny Goldberg, Nick Tosches, Keith Altham, Michael Lydon, Robert Greenfield, Charlie Gillett, Greg Shaw, Geoffrey Cannon, Jon Tiven, Al Aronowitz, Lester Bangs, Gene Sculatti, Ken Barnes, Metal Mike Saunders, Mitchell Cohen and Keith Maillard. The magazine also published pieces by Barry Miles and David Walley.

The title Fusion is the name of the online arts magazine of Berklee College of Music, which is also based in Boston.
