= Summertime (George Gershwin song) =

Aria from the opera Porgy and Bess

Composition
- Language: English
- Published: 1935 by Gershwin Publishing (distributed by Chappell & Co.)
- Genre: Opera; jazz
- Composer: George Gershwin
- Lyricist: DuBose Heyward

"Summertime" is an aria composed in 1934 by George Gershwin for the 1935 opera Porgy and Bess. The lyrics, in two stanzas, are by DuBose Heyward, the author of the novel Porgy on which the opera was based.

The song soon became a popular and much-recorded jazz standard, described as "without doubt ... one of the finest songs the composer ever wrote ... Gershwin's highly evocative writing brilliantly mixes elements of jazz and the song styles of Black people in the southeast United States from the early twentieth century". Composer and lyricist Stephen Sondheim characterized Heyward's lyrics for "Summertime" and "My Man's Gone Now" as "the best lyrics in the musical theater". In June 2026, CBS News included the song in its list of the 250 essential American songs of the past 250 years.

== Porgy and Bess ==
Gershwin began composing the song in December 1933, attempting to create his own spiritual in the style of the African American folk music of the period. Gershwin had completed setting DuBose Heyward's poem to music by February 1934 and spent the next 20 months completing and orchestrating the score of the opera.

The song is sung several times throughout Porgy and Bess. Following the communal "wa-do-wa", its lyrics are the first words heard in act 1 of the opera, sung by Clara as a lullaby. The song theme is reprised soon after as counterpoint to the craps game scene, in act 2 in a reprise by Clara, and in act 3 by Bess, singing to Clara's now-orphaned baby after both parents died in the storm.

The song was recorded for the first time by Abbie Mitchell on July 19, 1935, with George Gershwin playing the piano and conducting the orchestra (on: George Gershwin Conducts Excerpts from Porgy & Bess, Mark 56 667).

The 1959 film version of the opera featured Loulie Jean Norman singing the song. That rendition finished at #52 in AFI's 100 Years...100 Songs survey of top tunes in American cinema.

== Analysis ==
=== Lyrics ===
Heyward's inspiration for the lyrics was the southern folk spiritual-lullaby "All My Trials", of which he had Clara sing a snippet in his play Porgy. The lyrics have been highly praised by Stephen Sondheim. Writing of the opening line, he says

That "and" is worth a great deal of attention. I would write "Summertime when" but that "and" sets up a tone, a whole poetic tone, not to mention a whole kind of diction that is going to be used in the play; an informal, uneducated diction and a stream of consciousness, as in many of the songs like "My Man's Gone Now". It's the exact right word, and that word is worth its weight in gold. "Summertime when the livin' is easy" is a boring line compared to "Summertime and". The choices of "ands" [and] "buts" become almost traumatic as you are writing a lyric – or should, anyway – because each one weighs so much.

=== Music ===
Musicologist K. J. McElrath wrote of the song:

Gershwin was remarkably successful in his intent to have this sound like a folk song. This is reinforced by his extensive use (one exception: the note B under the word "high") of the pentatonic scale (C–D–E–G–A) in the context of the A minor tonality and a slow-moving harmonic progression that suggests a "blues". Because of these factors, this tune has been a favorite of jazz performers for decades and can be done in a variety of tempos and styles.

While in his own description, Gershwin did not use any previously composed spirituals in his opera, Summertime is often considered an adaptation of the African American spiritual "Sometimes I Feel Like a Motherless Child", which ended the play version of Porgy.

== Other versions ==
Statistics for the number of recordings of "Summertime" vary by source; while older data is restricted to commercial releases, newer sources may include versions self-published online. The Jazz Discography in 2005 listed 1,161 official releases, ranking the song fourth among jazz standards.

Other prominent versions include those by:

- In September 1936, a recording by Billie Holiday was the first to hit the US pop charts, reaching number 12.
- Sidney Bechet's 1939 recording was inducted into the Grammy Hall of Fame in 2011.
- The version by Louis Armstrong and Ella Fitzgerald, released on their 1959 album Porgy and Bess, was certified silver by the British Phonographic Industry (BPI) in 2022.
- The Chris Columbo Quintet (US number 93, 1963).
- The Zombies recorded a version for their eponymous EP in 1965. In 1972, their version reached 23 on the Dutch Top 40 and number 28 on the Dutch Single Top 100. According to Lindsay Planer of AllMusic, the Zombies' rendition was "as definitive a version as has appeared in the pre-Janis Joplin rock and roll era".
- Billy Stewart's scat-laden R&B version reached number 10 on the Billboard Hot 100 and number 7 on the R&B chart in 1966. His version also reached number 39 in the UK and number 13 in Canada.
- In the UK, a version by the Fun Boy Three reached number 18 on the UK singles chart in 1982.
- In 1996, Sublime recorded "Doin' Time", a re-imagining of the song to be about a cheating girlfriend whose infidelities and poor treatment of her lover make him feel like he is in prison ("doing time"). It reached number 87 on the Billboard Hot 100. In 2019, singer Lana Del Rey released a cover of Sublime's version, which reached number 59 on the Billboard Hot 100 and number one on the Billboard Hot Rock & Alternative Songs chart.
