= She's Not There =

1964 single by the Zombies

- One of side-A labels of original UK single

Single by the Zombies

from the album Begin Here
- B-side: "You Make Me Feel Good"
- Released: 24 July 1964
- Recorded: 12 June 1964
- Studio: Decca, West Hampstead, London
- Genre: R&B; jazz rock; beat; pop rock; baroque pop
- Length: 2:25
- Label: Decca F11940 (UK); Parrot 45PAR 9695 (US)
- Songwriter: Rod Argent
- Producer: Marquis Enterprises

The Zombies UK singles chronology
"She's Not There" (1964)	"Leave Me Be" (1964)

The Zombies US singles chronology
"She's Not There" (1964)	"Tell Her No" (1964)

"She's Not There" is the debut single by the English rock band the Zombies, written by keyboardist Rod Argent. It reached No. 12 in the UK Singles Chart in September 1964, and No. 2 on the Billboard Hot 100 in the United States at the beginning of December 1964. In Canada, it reached No. 2.

Rolling Stone magazine ranked "She's Not There" No. 297 on its list of the 500 Greatest Songs of All Time.

In 2016, the song by the Zombies was inducted into the Grammy Hall of Fame.

== Song profile ==
=== Lyrics and composition ===
Rod Argent built the lyrics of "She's Not There" from a John Lee Hooker song, whose title – "No One Told Me" – became a part of the opening phrase of "She's Not There". Following a 29 April 1964 performance by the Zombies at St Albans Market Hall, Argent played the one verse he had written of the song for Ken Jones who was set to produce the band's first recording session. Jones encouraged Argent to write a second verse, intending the band to record it. Argent recalls: "I wrote the song for Colin's range" – referring to Zombies' vocalist Colin Blunstone – "I could hear him singing it in my mind." Describing his first impression of the song, bassist Chris White stated: "It was absolutely fascinating. The song was breathtaking in its approach. We worked on some ideas and found out what to play in the bass. [...] That was Rod's first real experience of songwriting."

The song's genres and musical styles are described by authors and music journalists as jazz rock, beat, pop rock, baroque pop, and R&B.

Lyrically, the song takes place after the breakup of an adolescent relationship, where the male narrator laments "someone who wasn’t what they seemed, leaving a trail of lies and broken hearts." Whilst many lines reminisce about the ex-girlfriend's allure and physical beauty, the refrain of "But she’s not there" carries both a "literal and metaphorical [meaning], suggesting her physical absence and the emotional void she left behind," in addition to implying a lack of sincerity beneath her charming exterior. However, the narrator is not addressing the girl, but rather his friends who were aware of her character yet failed to warn him. When asked about the identity of the song's female subject in a 2020 interview with Forbes, Argent responded that "she wasn’t anybody, just a fictional character. It was just me weaving a story, basically."

=== Recording and single release ===
"She's Not There" was the second of four songs recorded by the Zombies at a 22 June 1964 recording session at Decca's West Hampstead Studio 2. The backing tracks needed seven takes. One of the song's most distinctive features is Argent's electric piano sound; the instrument used was a Hohner Pianet. The backing vocals are in a folk-influenced close-harmony style. To make the song sound stronger for single release, Ken Jones organised Hugh Grundy to record a strident drum line overdub which only appears on the original mono single mix.

The B-side was the Chris White-penned "You Make Me Feel Good", which band biographer Claes Johansen characterized as "pure Beat Boom. With its mid-tempo performance and accentuation on the first beat and second off-beat of each bar it is also a blueprint for how a typical Zombies song would sound during most of their Decca period." Initially, the band considered releasing this song as their debut single, but ultimately opted for "She's Not There". Argent has since praised the track, contending that it "should have been the follow-up [single]."

This minor key, jazz-tinged single was first aired in the United States during the first week in August 1964, on New York City rock radio station WINS by Stan Z. Burns, who debuted it on his daily noontime "Hot Spot" segment, during which new songs were played. The tune began to catch on in early autumn and eventually reached No. 2 on the Billboard Hot 100 in December 1964.

Ultimate Classic Rock critic Michael Gallucci rated it as the Zombies' greatest song, stating that it "still sounds like a revolutionary record.". Gallucci further stated that Argent "fills the track with jazz-inspired electric piano that set the Zombies apart from their blues-and R&B-borrowing contemporaries.

== Personnel ==
- Colin Blunstone – lead vocals and backing vocals
- Rod Argent – Hohner Pianet electric piano
- Paul Atkinson – electric guitar
- Chris White – backing vocals, bass
- Hugh Grundy – drums, additional overdubbed drums

== Album releases ==
The song was later included both on the Zombies' debut album Begin Here, released in the UK in December 1964, and the US album The Zombies issued January 1965. It was also included on the soundtrack to the 1979 feature film More American Graffiti and the 2021 feature film Titane.

== Charts ==
=== Weekly charts ===
Chart (1964–1965)	Peak position
Canada Top Singles (RPM)	2
Japan (Oricon)	1
New Zealand (Lever Hit Parade)	1
UK Singles (Official Charts)	12
US Billboard Hot 100	2
US Cash Box Top 100	1

=== Year-end charts ===
Chart (1964)	Rank
US Cash Box Top 100	29

== Certifications ==
Region	Certification	Certified units/sales
United Kingdom (BPI)	Silver	200,000^{‡}
^{‡} Sales+streaming figures based on certification alone.

== Santana cover ==
"She's Not There"

Single by Santana

from the album Moonflower
- B-side: "Zulu"
- Released: October 1977
- Genre: Jazz rock; Latin rock
- Label: Columbia
- Songwriter: Rod Argent

Santana singles chronology
"Let It Shine" (1976)	"She's Not There" (1977)	"Stormy" (1979)

"She's Not There" was a hit for Santana when it appeared on their 1977 album Moonflower. Their version peaked at No. 11 in the UK. It was also a hit in the US, spending 14 weeks on the Billboard Hot 100 and peaking at No. 27, as well as reaching No. 20 on the Cash Box Top 100 chart. Their take on it features Greg Walker as the lead vocalist.

=== Charts ===
==== Weekly charts ====
Chart (1977–1978)	Peak position
Australian Singles (Kent Music Report)	19
Belgium (Ultratop 50 Flanders)	7
Canada Top Singles (RPM)	21
Ireland (IRMA)	4
Netherlands (Dutch Top 40)	2
Netherlands (Single Top 100)	3
New Zealand (Recorded Music NZ)	9
Spain (AFE)	28
UK Singles (Official Charts)	11
US Billboard Hot 100	27
US Cash Box Top 100	20

==== Year-end charts ====
Chart (1978)	Peak position
Belgium (Ultratop Flanders)	37
Netherlands (Dutch Top 40)	14
Netherlands (Single Top 100)	12

== Other notable covers ==
- In February 1965, the Swedish pop group Ola & the Janglers released the song as their second single, backed by Manfred Mann's "Don't Ask Me What I Say". It became their breakthrough hit, reaching No. 10 on Tio i Topp for a week before being voted off.
- Colin Blunstone, under the pseudonym Neil McArthur, released a solo version in 1969, reaching No. 34 in the UK.
- The Road reached No. 79 in Canada with their cover in February 1969.
- Punk rock band U.K. Subs' 1979 cover reached No. 36 in UK.
- Griff covered the song for the soundtrack of the Amazon Prime series My Lady Jane (2024).
- "She's Not There" was also covered by the "Vanilla Fudge" on their self-titled album released in 1967. The album was Vanilla Fudge's most successful, peaking at #6 on the Billboard album charts and number #8 in Finland in November 1967.
