= Greg Russo =

American screenwriter

- Born: 1981 (age 44–45); Philadelphia, Pennsylvania, U.S.
- Education: Vassar College
- Occupation: Screenwriter
- Writing career
- Years active: 2010–present

Greg Russo is an American screenwriter. He is best known for writing the 2021 film adaptation of Mortal Kombat.

== Early life ==
Russo attended Vassar College after graduating high school in Cherry Hill. Russo could not find work in the film industry when he graduated in 2003, so he spent the next four years working for a headhunting firm in New Jersey, an experience he called “lucrative but soul-sucking.” When his then-girlfriend (now spouse), Tricia Gonnella, was accepted into the graduate Peter Stark Producing Program at the University of Southern California in 2007, they moved to Los Angeles.

== Career ==
Russo's first break came in 2010, when he optioned the contained thriller spec script Down to Relativity Media.

He followed up Down in October 2010 with the highly received action thriller spec I-95 which placed #3 overall on the year end Hit List, a list of the best un-produced original screenplays in Hollywood hosted by The Tracking Board. "I-95" was later changed to "Autobahn" and optioned by Inferno Entertainment.

In 2011, Russo sold an original action-thriller pitch entitled Black Ice to Alloy Entertainment. He also worked on the Paramount Pictures action film Heatseekers produced by Michael Bay.

In 2012, Russo was hired to write the action film "High Speed" for Act of Valor director Scott Waugh.

In 2013, Russo was hired by Relativity Media to adapt the sci-fi/action Arcana comic "Continuum" into a feature film. Later that year, Universal Pictures hired Russo to adapt its action/spy film It Takes a Thief based on the TV series of the same name.

In the summer of 2014, Russo sold the original TV pilot "Chop Shop" to 20th Century Fox with Chris Morgan producing.

In 2015, New Line Cinema hired Russo to pen disaster thriller "Category 6" a sequel to the film Into the Storm

In November 2016, it was announced that Russo would be penning an adaptation of the 1992 video game Mortal Kombat for New Line Cinema, directed by Simon McQuoid and produced by James Wan. The film was released on April 23, 2021. It opened at #1 at the U.S. domestic box office and grossed $83.7 million worldwide.

In May 2017, Russo was initially attached as writer for Resident Evil: Welcome to Raccoon City, but confirmed in November 2018 that he was no longer involved with the project. In was also revealed that Russo was hired by Sony Pictures to adapt the anime Robotech into a feature film.

In May 2018, Russo was hired to write an adaptation of the 2005 video game F.E.A.R. Also in 2018, Russo was hired by New Line Cinema to pen an adaptation of the DC Comics title Highwaymen.

In August 2018, it was announced that Russo would be penning the sequel to the 2017 American adaptation of Death Note for Netflix. Russo also affirmed that the film would be more faithful to the source material.

In April 2019, Russo became attached to write an adaptation of the Saints Row franchise, with F. Gary Gray set to direct. Later in July, Russo was attached to write an adaptation of Space Invaders for New Line Cinema.

In January 2022, it was announced that Russo would direct, write and executive produce a television adaptation of System Shock for the streaming service Binge. The series will mark Russo's directorial debut.

In 2023, Russo preemptively sold an original sci-fi thriller pitch titled Seismic to Netflix with 21 Laps producing.
