= Tell Her No =

Single by the Zombies

from the album The Zombies
- B-side: "What More Can I Do" (UK) / "Leave Me Be" (US)
- Released: 28 December 1964 (US); 29 January 1965 (UK)
- Recorded: November 25, 1964
- Genre: Pop; jazz rock
- Length: 2:07
- Label: Decca F12072; Parrot 9723
- Songwriter: Rod Argent
- Producer: Ken Jones

The Zombies UK singles chronology
"Leave Me Be" (1964)	"Tell Her No" (1965)	"She's Coming Home" (1965)

The Zombies US singles chronology
"She's Not There" (1964)	"Tell Her No" (1964)	"She's Coming Home" (1965)

"Tell Her No" is a hit single written by Rod Argent and included by English rock band the Zombies on their debut album The Zombies in 1965. It peaked at No. 6 on the Billboard Hot 100 chart in the United States in March 1965 and was one of three big American hits by the Zombies (the others being "She's Not There", in 1964, and "Time of the Season", in 1969). "Tell Her No" was only a minor hit for the Zombies in their native Britain, where it peaked at No. 42 on the UK Singles Chart in February 1965.

In 1983, Juice Newton scored a Billboard Top 40 hit in the United States with her version of the song.

== Style ==
According to Argent, "Tell Her No" was influenced by the music of Burt Bacharach and Hal David. In a contemporary review, Record World said "The fellows have slowed down their frenzy to sing a good follow-up to 'She's Not There.'" Cash Box described it as a "striking rock-a-rhythmic jumper" that's "a softly-essayed affair that moves along in ear-arresting fashion."

The Rolling Stone Illustrated History of Rock & Roll described it as "a standard Beatles cop" stating that it was "almost as good" as the Zombies' earlier hit single "She's Not There." Music critic Maury Dean described it as a precursor to jazz fusion for the way the song moves in fits and starts and for its polyrhythms. According to Allmusic critic Lindsay Planer, the song's "quirky instrumental introduction is repeated throughout and practically sounds off-key before it remarkably resolves into the slightly baroque verses." Planer praised the catchy melody, the tight arrangement and the song's "creative advancement." Dean called it an "excellent song," especially noting how Rod Argent's keyboards drive it. Michael Gallucci of Ultimate Classic Rock states that the song doesn't waste a second of its little more than two minutes.

The word "No" is mentioned a total of 63 times in the lyrics. Lead singer Colin Blunstone mumbled one line in the second refrain and wanted to rerecord it, but producer Ken Jones liked it that way and left it in, leading listeners to wonder what was actually being sung. Blunstone thinks the words sung were "Don’t love this love from my arms." Gallucci particularly praised how Blunstone sang the "whoa-oh-oh" a little earlier in the song, during the second verse.

== Cover versions ==
In 1969, the song was given a dramatic makeover by Californian blues rock group Smith, which featured female lead singer Gayle McCormick, with the lyrics recast for a female narrator and re-titled "Tell Him No". This version was included on their debut album A Group Called Smith, which also featured their Top 5 hit version of the Bacharach-David song "Baby It's You".

In 1983, country-pop singer Juice Newton recorded a cover of "Tell Her No" from the album Dirty Looks. Newton reached No. 14 on the US Billboard Adult Contemporary chart and No. 27 on the US Billboard Hot 100 chart. She changed the song's lyrical gender and point of view, which significantly altered the song's meaning to being about a woman convincing her man to resist the temptations of a potential adulteress.

Del Shannon also did a take on the song. Tahiti 80 performed the song in concert.
