= Decca Studios =

Former recording studio in West Hampstead, London

Coordinates: 51.5463°N 0.1904°W

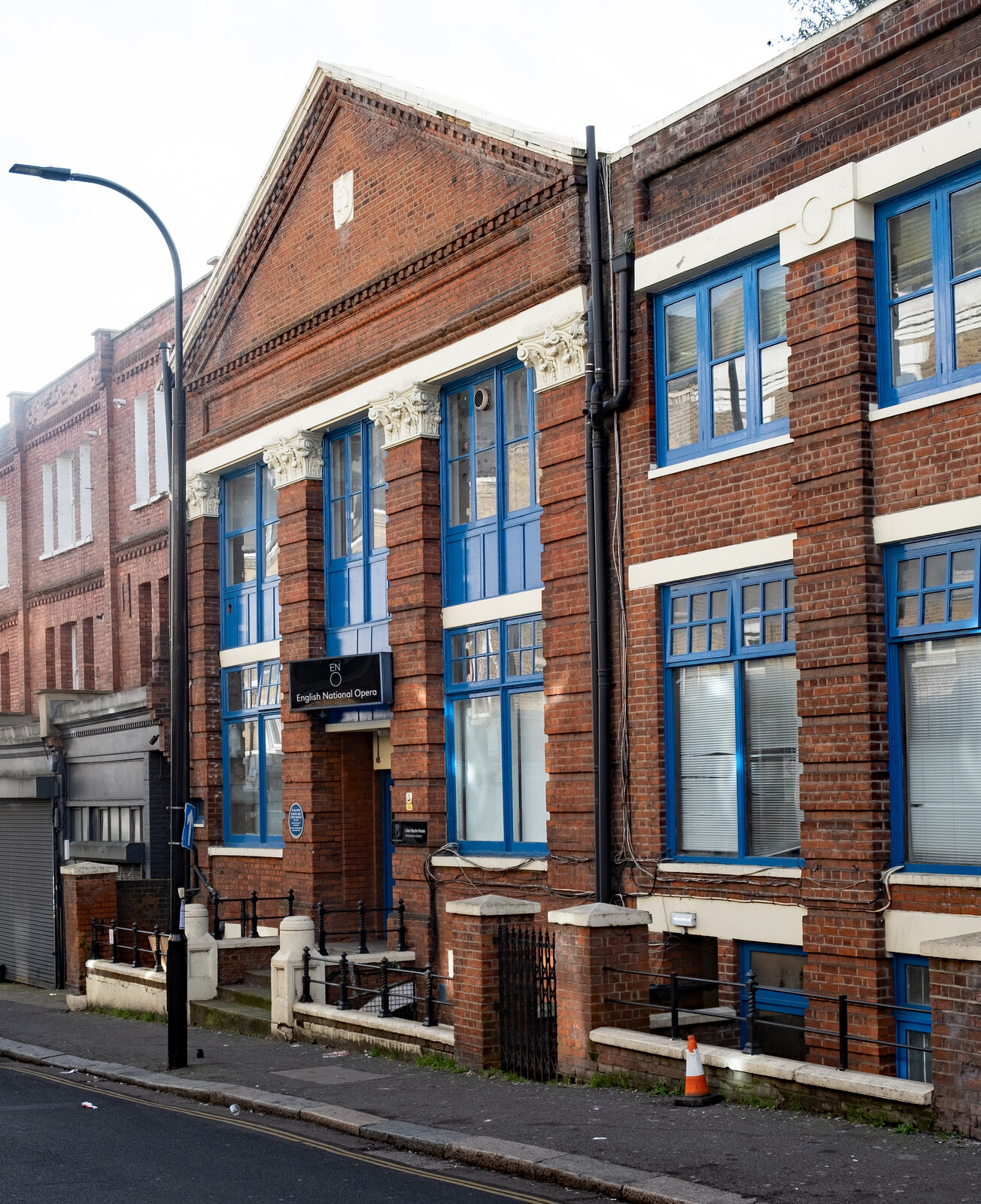

Decca Studios was a recording facility at 165 Broadhurst Gardens, West Hampstead, North London, England, controlled by Decca Records from 1937 to 1980.

== History ==
The building that housed Decca Studios at 165 Broadhurst Gardens in London was built in the 1880s as the Falcon Works, a place for tradespeople to work from. A few years later it was turned into a venue, including two halls, for concerts, meetings and other gatherings. Although named West Hampstead Town Hall, it was a venue for hire, rather than a local government facility. In 1928, Crystalate Gramophone Record Manufacturing took it over and moved its recording studio there. In 1937, Decca took over Crystalate's record division and moved its recording production to the Broadhurst Gardens studios, closing its existing Upper Thames Street studio.

From British Decca's beginnings in 1929, its earliest recordings were made at two locations, the Chenil Galleries Studios in Chelsea, and later in Lower Thames Street. In 1961, Decca expanded by building Studio 3, with a live room large enough to accommodate a full symphony orchestra, on land adjacent to 195 Broadhurst Gardens.

The Beatles failed their Decca audition at the location on 1 January 1962, and subsequently signed with Parlophone instead.

With the sale of Decca to PolyGram, the studios were closed in 1981 and the building was renamed Lilian Baylis House. In recent years, it has been used as rehearsal space by English National Opera. The building was awarded Grade II listed status in August 2021.

== Recording artists ==
Many popular songs and albums were recorded at Decca Studios. John Mayall's 1968 Blues from Laurel Canyon was recorded there, along with five albums by the Moody Blues. David Bowie recorded his first single, "Liza Jane", at the studio in 1964. The studios also saw the formation of the original Fleetwood Mac, under the aegis of then-Bluesbreakers guitarist Peter Green, after John Mayall bought him studio time as a birthday present, recording the tracks "First Train Home", "Rambling Pony" and the instrumental "Fleetwood Mac". Marc Bolan recorded his debut single "The Wizard" at the studio in 1965. Marmalade recorded most of their Decca hits in Studio 2, including "Reflections of My Life". Adam and the Ants recorded full band demos of their then live repertoire at the studio in August and December 1978. These have been widely bootlegged among Adam Ant fans prior to their commercial release. The Zombies recorded "She's Not There" at the facility.

Many classical recordings were made at the studios. Britain's leading big band, led by Ted Heath, made a succession of recordings at Broadhurst Gardens for Decca during the band's peak years, from 1945 until Heath's death in 1969.

== Selected recordings ==
- All Time Top Twelve Ted Heath and his Music, De LK 4208
- The Rolling Stones, The Rolling Stones (1963)
- The Flies recorded "(I'm Not Your) Stepping Stone" and "House of Love" in Studio 2
- Begin Here, The Zombies (1965).
- Bluesbreakers with Eric Clapton, John Mayall's Bluesbreakers (1966)
- Crusade, John Mayall's Bluesbreakers (1967)
- Bare Wires, John Mayall's Bluesbreakers (1968)
- Blues from Laurel Canyon, John Mayall (1968)
- Days of Future Passed (1967), The Moody Blues
- In Search of the Lost Chord (1968), The Moody Blues
- On the Threshold of a Dream (1969), The Moody Blues
- To Our Children's Children's Children (1969), The Moody Blues
- A Question of Balance (1970), The Moody Blues

== See also ==
- The Beatles' Decca audition - for a fuller account
