= Ken Jones (musician) =

British conductor and composer (1927–1988)

- Born: 2 October 1927; Manchester, England
- Died: 25 April 1988 (aged 60); France
- Occupation: Composer
- Spouse: Betty Jones
- Children: 3

Kenneth Jones (2 October 1927 – 25 April 1988) was a British conductor and composer of film and television music. Among his work Jones was musical director for the television chat show Aspel & Company and wrote the scores for several comedy films.

== Life and career ==
Jones was born in Manchester and began his music career as a studio arranger for Norrie Paramor, there he worked arranging music for The Zombies, Jim Dale, and Jonathan King. In the 1960s he established his own orchestra and began a career in film and television. He had earlier collaborated with Douglas Gamley on several film scores including Fire Down Below, Tom Thumb and The City of the Dead, and later wrote complete scores for films such as Two-Way Stretch, Dentist in the Chair and its sequel Dentist on the Job and in 1964 he was hired by the BBC to compose the music for Steptoe and Son, where he replaced Ron Grainer (who had left the series to concentrate on Doctor Who).

For BBC Television, Jones composed and arranged the themes for It's Marty, and the sitcom Sykes which ran from 1972 until 1979. Also in 1979, Jones conducted the United Kingdom entry at the Eurovision Song Contest which was sung by Black Lace. Alyn Ainsworth had served as conductor for the national final, but he was unable to attend the contest in Jerusalem. Between 1984 and 1988 he served as musical director for Aspel & Company, and from 1979 to 1988 for the Paul Daniels Magic Show.

In 1979, Jones was picked up by rival station ITV, where he wrote and composed the theme tune and music to the sitcom Only When I Laugh.

Jones remained associated with music throughout the 1980s. He died in 1988 while on holiday in France.

== Selected filmography ==
- Indiscreet (1958)
- Tom Thumb (1958)
- The Rough and the Smooth (1959)
- The City of the Dead (1960)
- Two-Way Stretch (1960)
- Tarzan the Magnificent (1960)
- Dentist in the Chair (1960)
- Foxhole in Cairo (1960)
- Offbeat (1961)
- Nearly a Nasty Accident (1961)
- Dentist on the Job (1961)
- Operation Snatch (1962)
- Tarzan Goes to India (1962)
- Dr. Crippen (1962)
- River Rivals (1967)
- Battle Beneath the Earth (1967)
