= I Want Her, She Wants Me =

Song written by Rod Argent

- British single label

Single by The Mindbenders

from the album With Woman in Mind
- B-side: "The Morning After"
- Released: 30 December 1966
- Recorded: Late 1966
- Genre: Pop
- Length: 2:19
- Label: Fontana
- Songwriter: Rod Argent
- Producer: Graham Gouldman

The Mindbenders singles chronology
"Ashes to Ashes" (1966)	"I Want Her, She Wants Me" (1966)	"We'll Talk About it Tomorrow" (1967)

Audio
- "I Want Her, She Wants Me (Live)" on YouTube

"I Want Her, She Wants Me" is a song written by English keyboardist Rod Argent, and initially recorded by English pop band the Mindbenders in 1966. Argent wrote and demo'ed the track with his band the Zombies in September 1966, but it was not released by them at the time as Decca Records wanted them to record cover versions of other songs. It was given away to the Mindbenders, who had been in need of a hit song. Their version is in a 4/4 beat with vocals by guitarist Eric Stewart and bassist Bob Lang. The lyrics are about the comforts of a love affair. The Mindbenders recorded their version in late 1966 with Graham Gouldman producing. When Fontana Records released the song as a single on 30 December 1966, it only reached number 59 on the Record Retailer chart. It received mixed reviews upon release, with critics noting the performance as weak.

The Zombies decided to record "I Want Her, She Wants Me" for Odessey and Oracle after Argent found the Mindbenders did not use the chords he had written for the track. The Zombies version was recorded at Olympic Studios in July or August 1967, with bassist Chris White playing a Fender Precision Bass with heavy echo. It is a baroque pop song featuring Argent both singing and playing harpsichord. The track was issued as part of Odessey and Oracle, which CBS released on 19 April 1968 in the UK, shortly after the band had announced their split. The song received good reviews by contemporary critics. Retrospectively, "I Want Her, She Wants Me" received mixed reception, with several journalists noting the song's upbeat nature, whilst other criticized the song's mix.

== Background and composition ==
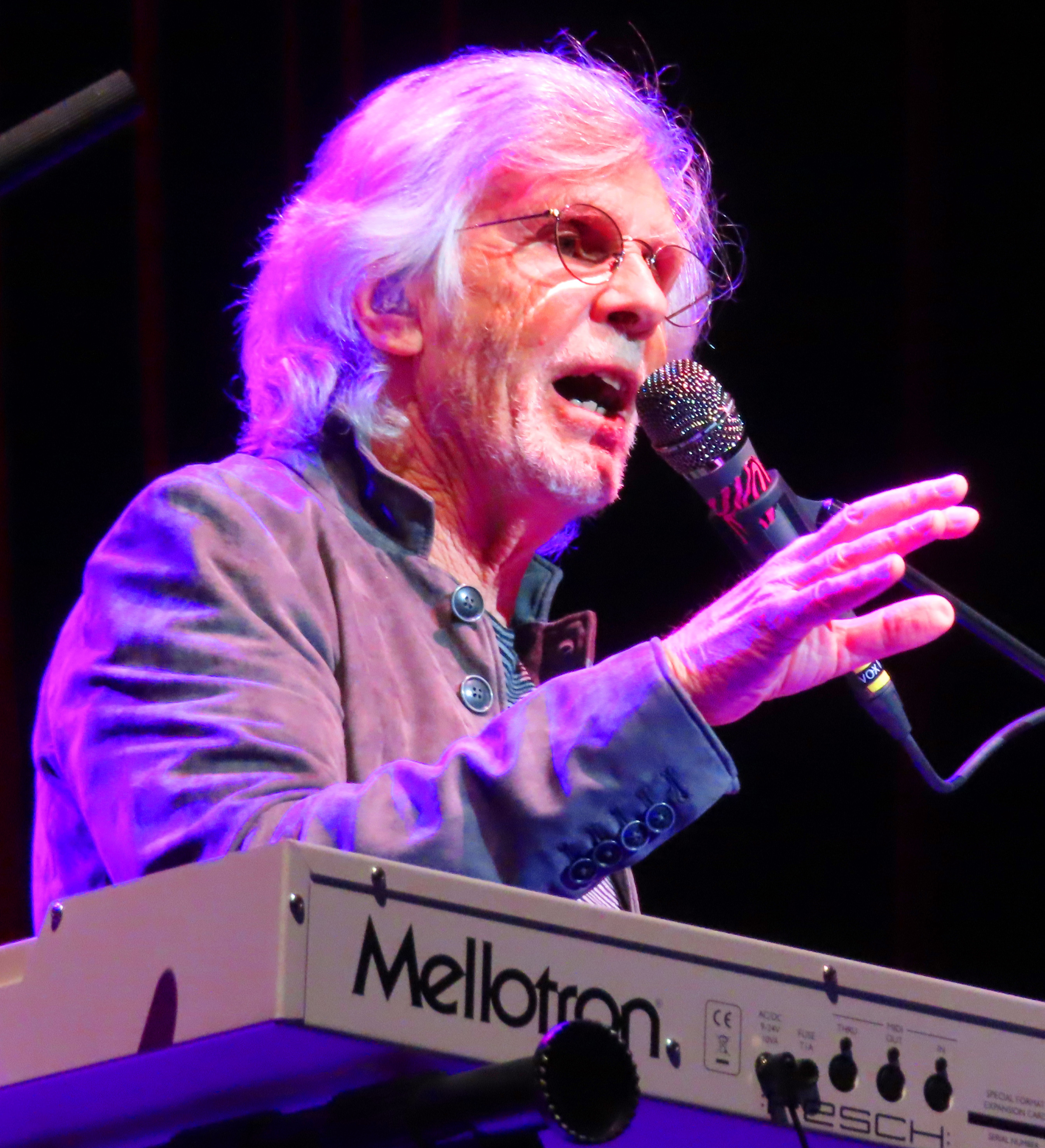
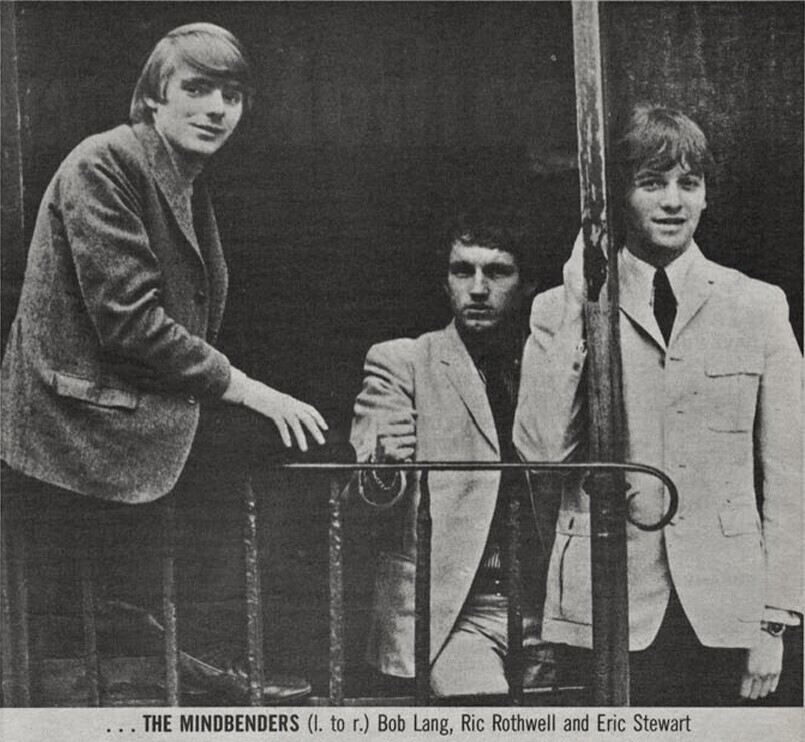
"I Want Her, She Wants Me" was written by Rod Argent (left) and initially recorded by the Mindbenders (right)

Keyboardist Rod Argent had composed "I Want Her, She Wants Me" and demoed it with his band the Zombies in September 1966, during a week long rehearsal session at the Wheathampstead Village Hall. Although the Zombies had two songwriters in Argent and bassist Chris White, Tito Burns at Decca Records believed that the band had an obligation to record a cover for their following single, following diminished commercial success in the charts. This resulted in the release of Clint Ballard Jr.'s "Gotta Get A Hold of Myself" on 23 September 1966. Instead, compositions by Argent and White were demoed by the Zombies for other bands to record.

Meanwhile, British pop trio the Mindbenders had experienced commercial success with their version of "A Groovy Kind of Love" which reached number two on both the Record Retailer chart in the UK and on the Billboard Hot 100 in the US. The song, along with the Mindbenders two following singles were all penned by Toni Wine and Carole Bayer, and the band relied on outside songwriters for their single A-sides, despite their guitarist Eric Stewart having developed "into a very strong songwriter in his own right. Though their latest single "Ashes to Ashes" had been a top-twenty entry in the UK, By late 1966, almost a year had passed since "A Groovy Kind of Love" was released, and they "desperately needed a fresh hit". According to White, "I Want Her, She Wants Me" was introduced to the Mindbenders by a person connected to the band.

As recorded by the Mindbenders, "I Want Her, She Wants Me" was according to music writer Greg Russo a "rigid 4/4 guitar-based take", with a running length of 2:19. The song is in the key of G major, and described as "poppy" by music journalist Penny Valentine. Lyrically, the track "relates all of the wonder and comfort of a secure love affair", with the few opening line "I close my eyes and soon I'm feeling sleepy" putting the subject into context immediately. The Zombies biographer Claes Johansen instead identifies the lyrics as having an "I'm-such-a-good-guy" theme. Mindbenders biographer Brian Summer noted the lyrics as representing the guy as being "on a pink cloud", with "life as very good". The Mindbenders recorded their version of the song by the end of 1966, and their version of the track was produced by Graham Gouldman, who later joined the band as a bassist in 1968. The drums were recorded by Ric Rothwell, and in addition to performing guitars and bass respectively, Stewart and Bob Lang also sang on the track.

== Release and reception ==
Fontana Records released "I Want Her, She Wants Me" as the Mindbenders fourth single in the UK on 30 December 1966. (Note: Catalogue number Fontana TF 780.) The single had the Stewart composition "The Morning After" on the B-side. Biographer Stefan Granados noted that the release was a "brave choice" to depart from the writing of Wine and Bayer. However, the single became an "inexplicable flop", only reaching number 59 on the chart published by Record Retailer for a week in January 1967. (Note: At the time, the Record Retailer chart consisted of 50 spots, with a further 13 spots on a "bubbling under" chart called the Breakers List.) The single received airplay on pirate radio shortly after release, and it reached number 30 on the Wonderful Radio London chart Fab 40 on 1 January 1967. A US release of the single followed on 23 January 1967, (Note: Catalogue number Fontana F-1571.) though neither the UK or US edition sold according to Russo. "I Want Her, She Wants Me" was also issued as part of the Mindbenders second and final studio album With Woman in Mind on 7 April 1967, (Note: Catalogue number Fontana TL 5403 (mono), STL 5403 (stereo)) where it was sequenced between "Shotgun" and "Mystery Train". The album was not issued in the US, "did little anywhere else and disappeared" despite the inclusion of both "Ashes to Ashes" and "I Want Her, She Wants Me".

Penny Valentine stated that although the track was vocally "uneven", it was made up by the strong melody and composition. She also noted the prominent use of piano, which was unusual for a Mindbenders single. The staff reviewer for Melody Maker characterized the track as a "hard hitting stomper" without the "London slippery-hippery". They noted the track as "strange" and believed it required "a few listens before a rating could be given". In a blind date for the magazine, singer Paul Jones described the track as "quite nice", but "too complicated to be a hit". He believed it to be "nine-tenths nice, but doesn't have that other ten percent". Derek Johnson of the New Musical Express stated the track to have a "shocking good beat" and categorized the track as "hypnotic". He believed that although the melody itself was catchy, it didn't manifest well in the Mindbenders take of the song. Similarly, Peter Jones from Record Mirror believed the track wasn't one of the Mindbenders strongest, despite containing a "nice jog-along beat sound". He praised it for having a "pleasing tune", but found the backing to be dominating.

Retrospectively, AllMusic critic Dave Thompson stated that the Mindbenders taste remained "impeccable" when they chose to record "I Want Her, She Wants Me". Granados believed the track to be one of the band's "finest performances" they had recorded up to that point. On the contrast, Russo found the Mindbenders version to be a "somewhat one-dimensional take". Feeling chastened by the lack of success, the Mindbenders decided to "play it safe with the tried" and recorded yet another Wine and Bayer composition, "We'll talk About it Tomorrow", as their fifth single.

== The Zombies version ==
"I Want Her, She Wants Me"

Song by the Zombies

from the album Odessey and Oracle
- Released: 19 April 1968
- Recorded: July or August 1967
- Studio: Olympic, London
- Genre: Baroque pop; bubblegum pop
- Length: 2:52
- Label: CBS
- Songwriter: Rod Argent
- Producer: The Zombies

Lyric video
- "I Want Her, She Wants Me" on YouTube

=== Background and recording ===
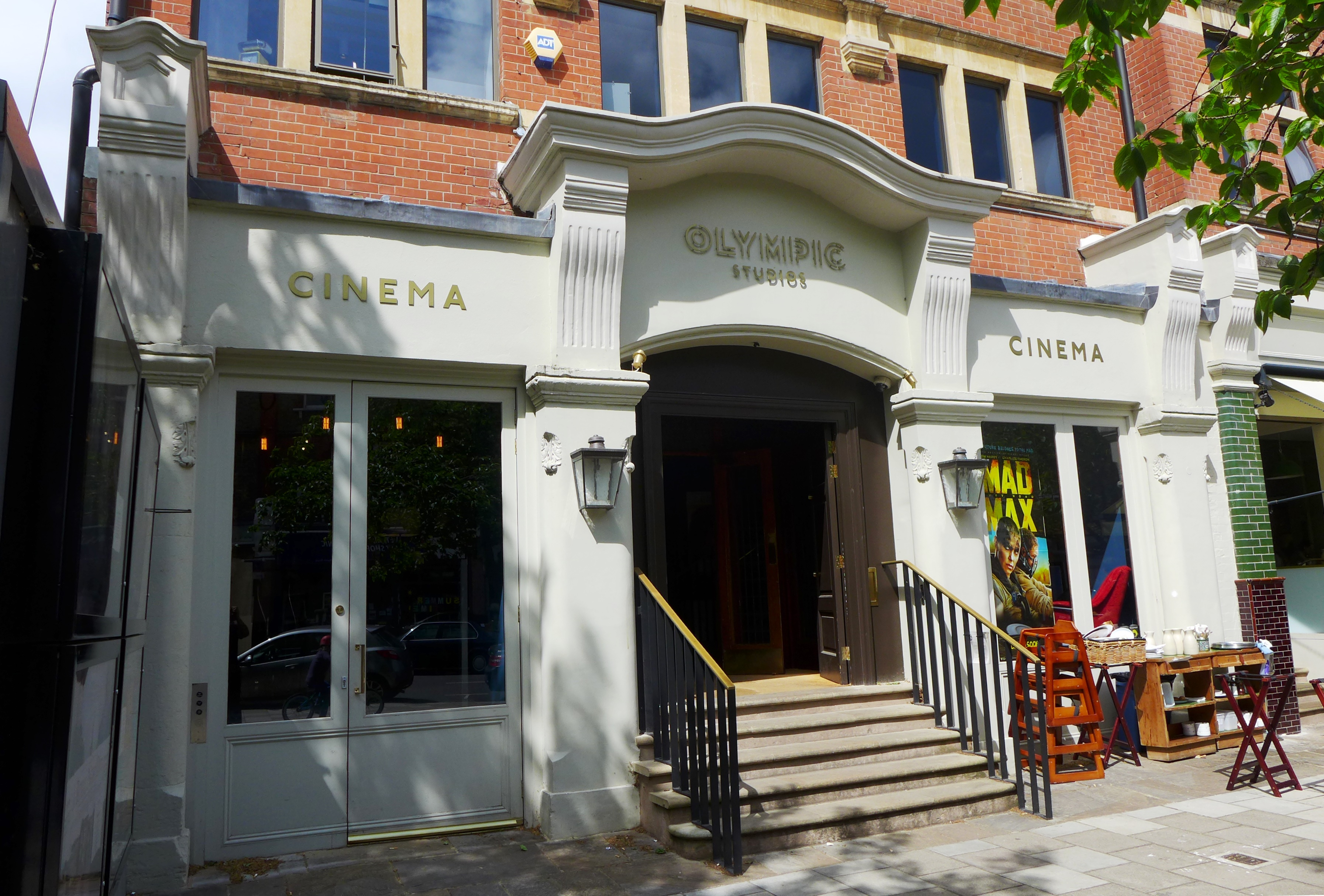
"I Want Her, She Wants Me" was one of several Odessey and Oracle tracks recorded at Olympic Studios.

Rod Argent allegedly hated the Mindbenders recording of "I Want Her, She Wants Me", as he believed they got the chords wrong. After being signed to CBS and given the chance to record a self-produced album in 1967, White told Argent that they should "do it properly. The track was the oldest composed song included on Odessey and Oracle, with Johansen believing the summer of 1967 to be an incredibly productive period for White, whereas Argent was instead "drawing on material written more than a year before" when it came to tracks. Russo believed that the Mindbenders version did not detract the Zombies from recording it. It was recorded in July or August 1967 at Olympic Studios together with "Beechwood Park" and "Maybe After He's Gone", as opposed to their preferred EMI Studios. (Note: According to Russo, EMI Studios was fully booked during July 1967. Johansen stated that the Zombies sessionography became "uncertain" when recording at Olympic, hence being unable to pinpoint an exact recording date.) The song was mixed into stereo by Argent and White on 27 December 1967, with a complete master finished the following day.

White had started using a Fender Precision Bass during the album's session, something which Palao believed gave "I Want Her, She Wants Me" and "Care of Cell 44" more "weight and prominence than before", compared to when he used his Gibson. Musicologist Walter Everett cites the track as one of few examples where heavy echo was applied to the bassline, together with the Beach Boys "God Only Knows". Russo noted White's playing as "playful". The song is one of few in the Zombies discography containing a fade-out, with the vocalists repeating the title phrase 12 times before song "completely disappeared". The song's stereo mix contained backing vocals not audible in the mono version.

Although the Zombies version of "I Want Her, She Wants Me" featured Paul Atkinson playing 4/4 on his guitar similarly to the Mindbenders rendition, Russo believed that their rendition perfected the "pop-filled" Argent track. Alec Palao similarly notes their rendition as being in "pop mode". The track prominently features harpsichord owned by the Beatles and played by Argent. Billboard journalist Joe Lynch cited the song as a rare track both written and sung by Argent, whose voice fit the song's baroque pop theme. Ordinary lead vocalist Colin Blunstone had "very little to do" with the song, though he sang co-lead with Argent during the middle eight. By contrast, Mary Beth Bauermann of Flat Hat Magazine believed the track to instead lean towards bubblegum pop-rock, with the harpsichord instead utilized to its "timeless, sunny mood".

=== Release and reception ===
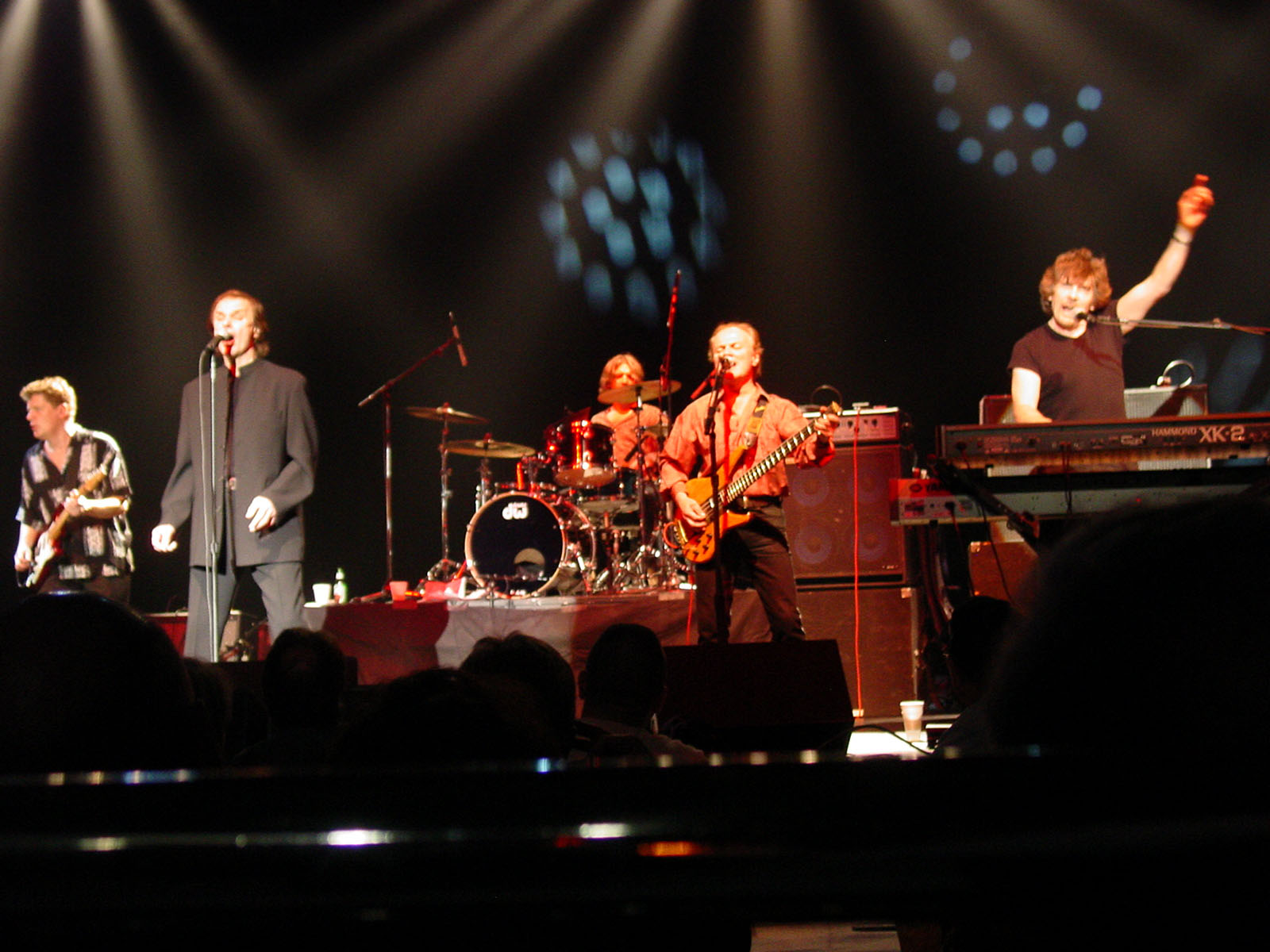
The Zombies have performed "I Want Her, She Wants Me" after reuniting.

The Zombies performed their final gig together on 20 December 1967 in Hereford, and disbanded shortly afterwards. CBS released "I Want Her, She Wants Me" as part of the album Odessey and Oracle in the UK on 19 April 1968, (Note: Catalogue number CBS 63280 (mono), CBS S 63280 (stereo)) shortly after the band had announced their split on 30 March 1968. On the album, "I Want Her, She Wants Me" is sequenced on side two between the opening track "Changes" and "This Will Be Our Year". In the US, Odessey and Oracle was first issued through Date Records on 15 July 1968, carrying the same track listing. (Note: Catalogue number Date TES 4013 (stereo only)) Upon release, the album received sporadic reviews, with the Roy Jonhson of the Los Angeles Times believing the track to be "particularly memorable". Allen Evans of the New Musical Express singled out the song alongside "This Will Be Our Year" as tracks he liked, stating there to be "much beauty here".

Retrospectively Matthew Greenwald of AllMusic stated that "I Want Her, She Wants Me" was a "buoyant and jubilant a pop song as you could ask for", and believed the track to be a "wonderfully light pop statement", and noted the contrast to the heavier tracks on side two of Odessey and Oracle, which he thought the song "balanced" out. Palao similarly wrote that the track stood in contrast to the rest of the album, and believed the harmonies to be Beatles-inspired. Fred Thompson noted the track to contain a "blissed-out bounce" that was reminiscent of the two other album tracks "Beechwood Park" and "Friends of Mine". According to Lynch, the part on which "reaches for a note just out of his range while singing the word “mind”" marked a highlight on the album for him, and he placed it in his top-ten list of Zombies songs. On the contrary, Johansen singled the song out together with "Maybe After He's Gone" and "Time of the Season" as songs he didn't think stood up to the rest of the album's quality. He opinioned the flaw was in the song's performance, mix and lyric, the latter of which's theme he believed was taken a step "too far".

Nonetheless, "I Want Her, She Wants Me" has appeared on several compilation albums by the Zombies, including Zombie Heaven (1997). A mono mix of the track was released as part of the 50th anniversary re-issue of Odessey and Oracle. The Zombies have performed the song during reunions, including in 2008 when they performed the entirety of Odessey and Oracle in conjunction with its 40th anniversary. The Zombies additionally performed it with Brian Wilson of the Beach Boys during a joint performance at the Beacon Theatre in New York City on 26 September 2019.

=== Personnel ===
As per Claes Johansen, unless noted.

- Rod Argent – lead vocals, harpsichord
- Paul Atkinson – electric guitar
- Colin Blunstone – backing vocals, co-lead vocals (middle eight)
- Hugh Grundy – drums
- Chris White – bass, backing vocals

== Charts ==
=== The Mindbenders ===
Weekly chart performance for "I Want Her, She Wants Me"
Chart (1967)	Peak position
UK (Record Retailer)	59
