= A Rose for Emily (song) =

1968 song by the Zombies

Song by the Zombies

from the album Odessey and Oracle
- Released: 19 April 1968
- Recorded: 1 June & 10 July 1967
- Studio: EMI, London
- Genre: Chamber pop
- Length: 2:19
- Label: CBS
- Songwriter: Rod Argent
- Producer: The Zombies

"A Rose for Emily" is a song written by Rod Argent that was first released on the Zombies 1968 album Odessey and Oracle.

== Background and recording ==
Rod Argent recalls having written "A Rose for Emily" when he was still living at his parents home, and had a mindset in which he felt it was a requirement for him to write songs. According to him, it was "one of those songs" where he "plucked it out of the air" and "let the lines follow themselves". The song was first recorded after the Zombies had signed to CBS records in the spring of 1967, who gave the Zombies creative control over their music.

The backing track for "A Rose for Emily" was recorded during their first session for Odessey and Oracle on 1 June 1967 at EMI Studios in London, together with their first CBS single "Friends of Mine" shortly after the Beatles had finished recording Sgt. Pepper's Lonely Hearts Club Band there. Further work on the song was completed on 10 July 1967, with take 5 (a reduction of take 3) becoming the song's master take. Initial mixes of "A Rose for Emily" contained a supporting cello part performed by a session musician, but this was removed from the final release because "it sounded too 'Disney'" according to bassist Chris White.

== Music and lyrics ==
"A Rose for Emily" is a ballad which AllMusic critic Matthew Greenwald described as "one of the most evocative songs" on Odessey and Oracle. Irish Independent critic Ed Power described it as a "swirling mini-symphony." Greenwald describes the music by saying that the song is "surrounded by an elegant, wistful, classically inspired piano figure.". Zombies' biographer Claes Johansen said that "simple beauty marks this melancholic song." Music professor Christian Matijas-Mecca called it a "sublime love song." Piitsburgh Post-Gazette critic Scott Mervis described it as a "minor key delicacy." The piano, played by Argent, is the only instrumentation. Colin Blunstone sings the lead vocals, with Argent and Chris White providing backing vocals.

Matijas-Mecca described the arrangement as being "unusually simple." Johansen described the vocal arrangement as "extraordinary", for the way that the backing vocals "[weave] in and out of what is quite simply one of Colin Blumstone's most astonishing performances ever." Allmusic critic Fred Thomas said that Blunstone's "smoky, whispering singing accentuates the crushing loneliness" of the lyrics. Prog critic Claudia Elliott also praised Blumstone's "high-pitched wistful vocal." Johansen described Argent's piano playing as being "understatedly played in a sort of mock-beginner way, somehow supporting the lyrical theme of English village life, with old ladies living in a world of comfortable loneliness, rose gardens, missed opportunities."

The lyrics are about a lonely spinster. The theme has been compared to the Beatles' "Eleanor Rigby", which Argent has acknowledged as an inspiration for the song. Alexis Petridis of The Guardian also sees a similarity between the song's subject and Sylvilla in the Kinks "Two Sisters" and the subject of the Who's "Odorono". Petridis stated that the lyrics focus on "the heroine's otherness, her isolation, her sense of chances missed, her frustration, her pride." Music critic Jim DeRogatis suggested that the heroine of "A Rose for Emily" may be the same girl as the heroine of Pink Floyd's "See Emily Play".

Although the song shares its title with William Faulkner's story "A Rose for Emily", which is about the death of a spinster, Greenwald does not believe that the lyrics are related to the story, and Matijas-Mecca agrees. On the other hand, music columnist John O'Connell believes that the song "compresses Faulkner's story of that name into two minutes and nineteen seconds," and Petridis agrees that the song is a "retelling of Faulkner's tale."

== Reception and popular culture ==
Ultimate Classic Rock critic Michael Gallucci rated "A Rose for Emily" as the Zombies' third greatest song, stating that it's "one of Odessey & Oracle's most melodically somber songs, and one of the best." Galluci also stated that "The chamber-pop movement of the '90s pretty much starts here."

"A Rose for Emily" was used as the ending theme of the investigative journalism podcast S-Town. Petridis stated that even though the song appears to be an odd choice, it is appropriate due to the "eerie melancholy" of the song and the fact that the themes of the song also apply to the S-Town main character, John B McLemore.

== Personnel ==
Personnel according to band biographer Claes Johansen.

- Colin Blunstone – lead and backing vocals
- Rod Argent – piano, backing vocals
- Chris White – backing vocals
