= As Far as I Can See... =

As Far As I Can See...

Studio album by the Zombies
- Released: 26 April 2004
- Genre: Rock, pop
- Length: 46:15
- Label: Rhino
- Producer: Rod Argent

The Zombies chronology
R.I.P. (2000)	As Far As I Can See... (2004)	Breathe Out, Breathe In (2011)

As Far As I Can See is the fourth studio album by the British rock band the Zombies, and their first since 1991. The lineup includes three of the band's original members: Rod Argent, Colin Blunstone and Chris White, with fourth original member Paul Atkinson also serving as A&R for the record.

== Critical reception ==
Professional ratings
Review scores
Source	Rating
AllMusic	2/5 stars
Pitchfork	0.9/10
Robert Christgau	C-

As Far As I Can See was met with a negative response from critics.

== Track listing ==
All tracks are written by Rod Argent, except as noted.

No.	Title	Writer(s)	Length
1.	"In My Mind a Miracle"		4:43
2.	"Memphis"		5:02
3.	"Southside of the Street"		3:50
4.	"I Want to Fly"		4:14
5.	"Time to Move"		3:30
6.	"I Don't Believe in Miracles"	Russ Ballard	3:15
7.	"As Far As I Can See"		4:48
8.	"With You Not Here"		5:07
9.	"Wings Against the Sun"		3:21
10.	"Together"		3:12
11.	"Look for a Better Way"		5:13

== Personnel ==
The Zombies

- Colin Blunstone - vocals
- Rod Argent - keyboards, backing and lead vocals
- Keith Airey - lead guitar, backing vocals
- Jim Rodford - bass, backing vocals
- Steve Rodford - drums
- Chris White - backing vocals
- Mark Johns - rhythm guitar

Technical

- Steve Orchard - engineer, mixing
- Andrew Powell - conductor
- Nick Robbins - mastering
- Phil Smee - design, photography
- Gavyn Wright - leader
- Paul Atkinson - A&R
- Chris Cook, Keith Curtis - photography
