= Odessey and Oracle =

Studio album by the Zombies
- Released: 19 April 1968
- Recorded: 1 June – 7 November 1967
- Studios: EMI and Olympic, London
- Genres: Baroque pop; chamber pop; psychedelic pop; pop rock; avant-pop
- Length: 35:18
- Labels: CBS (UK); Date (US)
- Producer: The Zombies

The Zombies UK chronology
Begin Here (1965)	Odessey and Oracle (1968)	Time of the Zombies (1973)

The Zombies US chronology
The Zombies (1965)	Odessey and Oracle (1968)	Early Days (1969)

Singles from Odessey and Oracle
- 1. "Friends of Mine" Released: 22 September 1967 (UK only); 2. "Care of Cell 44" Released: 21 November 1967; 3. "Time of the Season" Released: 5 April 1968; 4. "Butcher's Tale (Western Front 1914)" Released: 10 June 1968 (US only)

Odessey and Oracle is the second studio album by the English rock band the Zombies. It was released on 19 April 1968, by CBS Records in the UK and on 15 July 1968, by Date Records in the US. The album was recorded primarily between June and August 1967 at EMI (now Abbey Road Studios) and Olympic Studios in London.

The Zombies, having been dropped from Decca Records, financed these sessions independently. After signing with CBS, two singles and later the album itself were released to critical and commercial indifference, and the band quietly dissolved. A third single from the album, "Time of the Season", became a surprise hit in the United States in early 1969 after CBS staff producer Al Kooper recommended it be released on Date Records.

The album gradually achieved critical praise and a cult following, and has since become one of the most acclaimed albums of the 1960s. It was ranked 80th on Rolling Stone magazine's list of the "500 Greatest Albums of All Time" in 2003. When Rolling Stone revised its list in 2020, the album was ranked 243rd.

== Recording and production ==
Odessey and Oracle was recorded after the Zombies signed a recording contract with the UK CBS label. They began work on the album in June 1967. Nine of the twelve songs were recorded at EMI Studios (now Abbey Road Studios), in Studio 3, where Pink Floyd had just finished recording their debut LP, The Piper at the Gates of Dawn. "Friends of Mine" was recorded on 1 June, "A Rose for Emily" was started on 1 June and completed on 10 July (take 5 reduction of take 3), "This Will Be Our Year" was recorded on 2 June (take 4) and 15 August (horn overdub), "Hung Up on a Dream" was recorded on 10–11 July (take 7 reduction of take 3), and "Butcher's Tale (Western Front 1914)" was recorded on 20 July (take 1). The EMI sessions used the same Studer four track machine used on Sgt. Pepper's Lonely Hearts Club Band.

In late July, when EMI was unavailable, the Zombies temporarily shifted base to Olympic Studios where they recorded "Beechwood Park", "Maybe After He's Gone" and "I Want Her, She Wants Me". They returned to EMI in mid-August to record "Care of Cell 44" (take 5 reduction of take 4) and "Brief Candles" (take 10 reduction of take 9) on 16–17 August and "Time of the Season" (14 September, take 1). The sessions ended in November and the final track to be recorded was "Changes" (take 5) on 7 November 1967.

Because the album was recorded to a deadline and tight budget, the Zombies worked quickly in the studio, having rehearsed rigorously beforehand. This meant that there would be no outtakes or unused songs recorded during the sessions. Cello and Mellotron parts were added to "A Rose for Emily" but left out at the final mixing stage.

Colin Blunstone and Paul Atkinson felt disillusioned and tempers flared during the recording of "Time of the Season". Blunstone was not at all keen on the song. When writer Rod Argent insisted that he sing it a certain way, Blunstone's patience snapped and he effectively told Argent to sing it himself. Blunstone finally sang the vocal as required.

Argent and Chris White mixed the album down into mono, but when they delivered the master to CBS, they were informed that a stereo mix was required. The recording budget having been spent, Argent and White used their own money to pay for the stereo mix. One major problem arose when it came time to mix "This Will Be Our Year" into stereo. Record producer Ken Jones had dubbed live horn parts directly onto the mono mix. With the horns not having been recorded on the multi-track beforehand, a "re-channeled" stereo mix had to be made of the mono master of this track. The stereo album mix was completed on 1 January 1968.

Morale within the band was at a low point at the end of the recording. Two singles, "Care of Cell 44" and "Friends of Mine", had been unsuccessful, and the band had a declining demand for live appearances, so after a final gig in mid-December 1967, the band split up.

== Composition and music ==
The style on Odessey and Oracle has been categorized as "lush, baroque-sounding chamber pop." The album's songwriting was characterized as "mixing trippy melodies, ornate choruses, and lush Mellotron sounds with a solid hard rock base." Bruce Eder of AllMusic characterized the album's instrumentation by "chiming, hard guitar, [and] highly melodic piano." Some of the material was categorized as white soul. Pat Long of NME noted the presence of jazz influence on the album, particularly within the keyboard stylings of Rod Argent. Some of the keyboard instruments incorporated by Argent include the harpsicord, organ and harmonium. Music critic Jim DeRogatis called the album "a melancholy look at England's lost innocence." The album's sound has drawn comparisons to Pet Sounds by the Beach Boys.

== Artwork ==
The album sleeve contains a short text by Argent quoting William Shakespeare's The Tempest. The misspelling of "odyssey" in the title was the result of a mistake by the designer of the LP cover, Terry Quirk (a friend of White's). The band tried to cover this up at the time of release by claiming the misspelling was intentional. The back of the album's sleeve reads: "Really, music is a very personal thing; it's the product of a person's experiences. Since no two people have been exactly alike, each writer has something unique to say. This makes anything which is not just a copy of something else worth listening to."

== Release history ==
Odessey and Oracle was released in the UK on 19 April 1968, which was preceded by the single release of "Time of the Season" on 5 April. Clive Davis, the head of CBS in the US, initially decided not to release the album. However, the US Columbia label had released the single "Care of Cell 44" on 21 November 1967 to complete indifference.

CBS staff producer Al Kooper had picked up a copy of the album during a trip to London, and when he returned to America and played the album he loved it. He believed it contained three hit singles. At the urging of Kooper the US division of CBS was eventually persuaded to release the album on the little known Date Records subsidiary label in June.

Date released "Butcher's Tale (Western Front 1914)" as a single in the US, feeling that the song's anti-war theme would resonate with record-buyers due to the Vietnam War. The next single, "Time of the Season," slowly gained popularity before finally hitting big on the US charts in March 1969. After the song became a hit, Date re-released Odessey and Oracle with severely cropped artwork. This time the album charted, reaching number 95 in the US. By then Rod Argent and Chris White were busy with their new band, Argent.

=== Other versions ===
For the 1997 Zombie Heaven box-set, "This Will Be Our Year" was given a full stereo mix, albeit minus the horns. This was made possible because the Zombies owned the multi track masters, which are in the possession of Chris White. Alternate mixes of "A Rose for Emily", featuring discarded overdubs of cello and Mellotron, appear on Zombie Heaven and the 30th anniversary release of the album.

== Reunion performances ==
Because the band split before the album was released, they never performed any of the songs onstage. However, due to the surprise success of "Time of the Season", several "fake" versions of the Zombies were created by unscrupulous promoters in 1969 to cash in on public demand to see and hear the band.

The original five-piece line-up reformed briefly in 1997 for the launch party of the Zombie Heaven boxset. They performed "She's Not There" and "Time of the Season" at London's Jazz Café. In 2001, Blunstone and Argent resurrected the Zombies as a recording and touring unit with ex-Argent and the Kinks bass guitarist Jim Rodford, his son Steve Rodford on drums and Keith Airey on guitar. The Blunstone-Argent lineup toured for several years, performing a number of songs from the album. There was one final reunion of the original five members in 2004 at a benefit gig for Paul Atkinson, and though Atkinson was very ill, he insisted on performing with them. Atkinson died later that year.

In March 2008, to celebrate the 40th anniversary of the album's release, the four surviving members performed Odessey and Oracle in its entirety for three shows at the Shepherd's Bush Empire in London. They were joined by Keith Airey, Darian Sahanaja and various friends. The Zombies were insistent on recreating the sound as authentically as possible, hence the extra singers, Sahanaja filling in organ and Mellotron parts via use of a Memotron, and Argent himself playing an original mellotron on a couple of numbers. Argent also tracked down a Victorian pump organ dating from 1896 so they could recreate White's "Butcher's Tale", the original organ having long since been given away or sold by White.

The 40th anniversary concerts were sold out and critically acclaimed. One of the shows was recorded, filmed, and released on CD and DVD as Odessey and Oracle (Revisited). The reunion was so successful that they decided to reprise the show on a short four-date British tour in April 2009, playing in Glasgow, Bristol, Manchester, and ending on 25 April at the Hammersmith Apollo in London, which Argent stated would be the very last time the album would be performed on stage, at least until the songs are reverted to public domain. This ended up not being true as the surviving members once again reunited to perform the album in its entirety across America in 2015.

In 2016, the band announced that they would do a final tour to commemorate the album's 50th anniversary the following year. They are also planning a coffee-table book about the making of the album.

In 2019, the surviving original members performed the album in its entirety on a string of dates supporting Brian Wilson, including a stop at the Greek Theater in Los Angeles on 12 September and one at the Beacon Theatre in New York City on 26 September 2019.

== Reception ==
Professional ratings
Review scores
Source	Rating
AllMusic	5/5 stars
Robert Christgau	A−
The Encyclopedia of Popular Music	5/5 stars
Pitchfork	9.3/10
Q	4/5 stars
Record Mirror	4/5 stars
Sputnikmusic	5/5

While the album was received indifferently upon its release, it has since gone on to gain a cult following and become a critically respected album. In their retrospective review, Bruce Eder of AllMusic gave the album five stars out of five, calling it "one of the flukiest (and best) albums of the 1960s, and one of the most enduring long-players to come out of the entire British psychedelic boom," while also referring to the tracks "Hung Up on a Dream" and "Changes" as "some of the most powerful psychedelic pop/rock ever heard out of England." BBC Music wrote "To this day it remains a word-of-mouth obscurity. But by those who know it's held in such regard that the remaining living members of the band are to perform it in its entirety this year, on the fortieth anniversary of its release." treblezine.com wrote "Odessey and Oracle, even by today's standards, is impossible to top."

=== Legacy ===
- Paul Weller of the Jam has often named the album as one of his all-time favourites, citing in particular its "autumnal" sound. In 2008, he included "Beechwood Park" in a playlist compiled for a magazine and has also covered "Time of the Season" during various radio sessions.
- Opeth's frontman Mikael Åkerfeldt called the album "a masterpiece".
- It was voted number 637 in Colin Larkin's All Time Top 1000 Albums.
- In 2012, Rolling Stone placed Odessey at number 100 in its "500 Greatest Albums of All Time" list.
- Stylus magazine placed it at number 196 on their "Top 101–200 Favourite Albums Ever" list.
- The Guardian placed it at number 77 on their "Alternative Top 100 Albums Ever" list.
- Mojo magazine placed it at number 97 in their "100 Greatest Albums Ever Made" list.
- NME placed it at number 32 on their "100 Greatest British Albums Ever!" list.
- Q magazine placed it at number 26 on their "50 Best British Albums Ever!" list.
- It was included in the book 1001 Albums You Must Hear Before You Die.
- Writing for Louder Than War in 2026, Martin Gray described the album as "a truly beautiful paradox" and asserted that "[it figures] regularly in those perennial lists of 'great lost masterpieces' of the 1960s and to this day is cited by many (musicians and critics alike) as one of the finest albums of the last 60 years."

The first song on the album, "Care of Cell 44", has been covered by a number of artists including Elliott Smith and Of Montreal. "This Will Be Our Year" has also been covered by multiple artists including OK Go, the Mynabirds, Dear Nora, Foo Fighters, and the Avett Brothers. Both songs were also included on Pitchfork Media's list of the "200 Greatest Songs of the 1960s".

== Track listing ==
Side one
No.	Title	Writer(s)	Length
1.	"Care of Cell 44"	Rod Argent	3:57
2.	"A Rose for Emily"	Argent	2:19
3.	"Maybe After He's Gone"	Chris White	2:34
4.	"Beechwood Park"	White	2:44
5.	"Brief Candles"	White	3:30
6.	"Hung Up on a Dream"	Argent	3:02

Side two
No.	Title	Writer(s)	Length
7.	"Changes"	White	3:20
8.	"I Want Her, She Wants Me"	Argent	2:53
9.	"This Will Be Our Year"	White	2:08
10.	"Butcher's Tale (Western Front 1914)"	White	2:48
11.	"Friends of Mine"	White	2:18
12.	"Time of the Season"	Argent	3:34

== Personnel ==
The Zombies

- Colin Blunstone – lead vocals (except on "I Want Her, She Wants Me" and "Butcher's Tale (Western Front 1914)"), backing vocals, tambourine
- Rod Argent – Hammond L100 organ, Mellotron, piano, harpsichord, pump organ, backing vocals, lead vocals on "I Want Her, She Wants Me", "Brief Candles" and "Hung Up on a Dream", sound effect on "Time of the Season"
- Paul Atkinson – electric guitar, backing vocals
- Chris White – bass, backing vocals, lead vocals on "Butcher's Tale (Western Front 1914)" and "Brief Candles"
- Hugh Grundy – drums, backing vocals

Additional musician

- unknown – trumpet on "This Will Be Our Year" (mono mix only)

Production

- The Zombies – producers, mono and stereo mixes
- Geoff Emerick – engineering
- Peter Vince – engineering
- Jools DeVere – design
- Terry Quirk – album artwork

== Accolades ==
Rankings for Odessey and Oracle
Year	Organization	Accolade	Rank
1995	Mojo	100 Greatest Albums Ever Made	97
1997	The Guardian	Alternative Top 100 Albums Ever	77
2003	Q	50 Best British Albums Ever!	26
2003	Rolling Stone	Rolling Stone's 500 Greatest Albums of All Time	80
2012	Rolling Stone	Rolling Stone's 500 Greatest Albums of All Time	100
2013	NME	The 500 Greatest Albums of All Time	145
2017	Pitchfork	The 200 Best Albums of the 1960s	47
2020	Rolling Stone	Rolling Stone's 500 Greatest Albums of All Time	243
