= Different Game =

Studio album by The Zombies
- Released: 31 March 2023
- Genres: Rock; pop; baroque pop; progressive rock
- Length: 39:16
- Label: Cooking Vinyl
- Producers: Rod Argent, Dale Hanson

The Zombies chronology
Still Got That Hunger (2015)	Different Game (2023)

Different Game is the seventh & final studio album by English rock band the Zombies, released on 31 March 2023 through Cooking Vinyl.

== Recording and production ==
Work began on the album in 2019 shortly after the band was inducted into the Rock and Roll Hall of Fame and was halted by the COVID-19 pandemic, but resumed after lockdown restrictions were lifted. The album was designed to sound like a live performance to "capture that magical, fleeting quality of energy and immediacy of performance".

== Composition ==
Different Game is eclectic in style. The album has been described as having "rockers" as well as "tender acoustic ballads with classical string arrangements". The Telegraph's Andrew Perry writes the album "harks back to the prog-rock era", bringing advanced composition and "instrumental virtuosity" to pop songs.

"Love You While I Can" is described by Clash editor Robin Murray as "[b]eatific baroque pop with a decidedly English feel, ... meld[ing] together West Coast harmonies with something soothing, and almost psychedelic."

"I Want to Fly" is a chamber pop song that draws from classical music, featuring only strings and vocals. Argent explained he had arranged it for a previous album but wanted to revisit it for Different Game, with a new arrangement by Chris Gunning. Argent described it as "an affectionate look back" to Blunstone's 1971 solo album One Year, which Argent produced with former Zombies bassist Chris White.

"Got to Move On" is a harmonica-driven blues stomp that Perry characterises as "Spencer Davis Group-style R&B."

== Cover ==
The album's cover photo, taken by Argent, shows the band's tour van after it broke down outside of Phoenix, Arizona. Blunstone explained: "We were traveling from Southern California to Tucson, when our tour van's engine suddenly caught fire! We spent about 5 hours stranded in the remote Arizona desert [...] It was a harrowing experience, but also beautiful and surreal." Argent said he felt the photo "seems to sum up what being in a band is truly like!" The event further inspired the lyric video for "Dropped Reeling & Stupid".

== Release and reception ==
Professional ratings
Aggregate scores
Source	Rating
Metacritic	72/100
Review scores
Source	Rating
AllMusic	3/5 stars
American Songwriter	4.5/5 stars
The Telegraph	4/5 stars

Different Game was released on 31 March 2023. At Metacritic, which assigns a normalised rating out of 100 to reviews from professional publications, the album has an average score of 72, based on 5 reviews, indicating "generally favorable reviews".

== Track listing ==
All tracks composed by Rod Argent, except where noted.

Different Game track listing
No.	Title	Writer(s)	Length
1.	"Different Game"		4:57
2.	"Dropped Reeling & Stupid"		3:52
3.	"Rediscover"		3:58
4.	"Runaway"		3:17
5.	"You Could Be My Love"		3:48
6.	"Merry-Go-Round"		4:24
7.	"Love You While I Can"		3:18
8.	"I Want to Fly"		4:16
9.	"Got to Move On"		3:54
10.	"The Sun Will Rise Again"	Colin Blunstone	3:27

== Personnel ==
The Zombies

- Colin Blunstone – lead vocals
- Rod Argent – keyboards, backing vocals; co-lead vocals on "Dropped Reeling & Stupid"
- Tom Toomey – guitar, backing vocals
- Søren Koch – bass, backing vocals
- Steve Rodford – drums
