= Breathe Out, Breathe In =

Studio album by the Zombies
- Released: 9 May 2011
- Genre: Pop rock
- Length: 38:54
- Label: Rhino
- Producer: Rod Argent

The Zombies chronology
As Far as I Can See... (2004)	Breathe Out, Breathe In (2011)	Still Got That Hunger (2015)

Professional ratings
Review scores
Source	Rating
Drowned in Sound	6/10
BBC Music	Mixed
Classic Rock	3.5/5 stars

Breathe Out, Breathe In is the fifth studio album by the English rock band the Zombies, released on 9 May 2011.

The band recorded a music video for the album's song "Any Other Way", their first music video since the band's original formation in 1961. Two of the songs on the album are remakes of earlier recordings by the band Argent. "Christmas for the Free" was originally released in 1973 on the album In Deep. "Shine on Sunshine" was originally released in 1975 on the album Circus.

== Track listing ==
All tracks composed by Rod Argent, except where noted.

No.	Title	Writer(s)	Length
1.	"Breathe Out, Breathe In"		3:39
2.	"Any Other Way"	Colin Blunstone	3:24
3.	"Play It for Real"		3:26
4.	"Shine On Sunshine"	Argent, Chris White	3:53
5.	"Show Me the Way"		3:21
6.	"A Moment in Time"	Argent, Tom Toomey	3:30
7.	"Christmas for the Free"	Argent, White	4:09
8.	"Another Day"		4:17
9.	"I Do Believe"		5:04
10.	"Let It Go"		4:11

== Personnel ==
The Zombies

- Colin Blunstone - lead vocals
- Rod Argent - keyboards, backing and lead vocals, production
- Tom Toomey - guitar
- Jim Rodford - bass, backing vocals
- Steve Rodford - drums
