= Dee Dee Warwick =

American soul singer (1942–2008)

Background information
- Born: Delia Juanita Warrick; September 25, 1942; Newark, New Jersey, U.S.
- Died: October 18, 2008 (aged 66) Essex County, New Jersey, U.S.
- Genres: Soul; R&B
- Occupation: Singer
- Years active: 1961–2008
- Labels: Jubilee; Tiger; Hurd; Blue Rock; Mercury; Atco; RCA; Sutra; Heritage; Private Stock
- Website: deedeewarwick.com

Delia Juanita Warrick (September 25, 1942 – October 18, 2008), known professionally as Dee Dee Warwick, was an American soul singer. Born in East Orange, New Jersey, she was the sister of singer Dionne Warwick, the niece of Cissy Houston, and a first cousin of singers Whitney Houston and Leontyne Price.

== Early life ==
Warwick was born in East Orange, New Jersey, to Mancel Warrick (1911–1977), who began his career as a Pullman porter and subsequently became a chef, a gospel record promoter for Chess Records and later a Certified Public Accountant; and Lee Drinkard-Warrick (1920–2005), manager of The Drinkard Singers. Warwick had one sister, Dionne Warwick, and a brother, Mancel Jr, who was killed in an accident in 1968 at the age of 21. She is of mixed African-American, Irish, and English descent, and claimed to have Native and Dutch ancestry in an interview. Warwick graduated from East Orange High School in 1960.

== Early career ==
Dee Dee Warwick sang with her sister Dionne Warwick and their aunt Cissy Houston in the New Hope Baptist Church Choir in Newark, New Jersey: eventually the three women formed the gospel trio the Gospelaires, who often performed with The Drinkard Singers.

At a performance by the Gospelaires with the Drinkard Singers at the Apollo Theater in 1959, the Warwick sisters were recruited by a record producer for session work and Dionne and Dee Dee Warwick, along with Doris Troy, subsequently became a prolific New York City area session singing team.

Dee Dee Warwick began to entertain in a solo career in the 1963 cutting what is reportedly the earliest version of "You're No Good" for Jubilee Records, produced by Jerry Leiber and Mike Stoller, who later recorded Warwick on their own Tiger label with the 1964 single "Don't Think My Baby's Coming Back". In 1964, Warwick recorded a version of "I (Who Have Nothing)" for a very smaller, Buffalo-based label (Hurd) - although the song's lyric was written by Leiber and Stoller, the duo did not participate in Warwick's recording - and Warwick also recorded as a member of Allison Gary and the Burners (as did Cissy Houston) with a release on Royo entitled "Darling".

Warwick made her network TV debut performing the gospel song "Children, Go Where I Send Thee" with her sister Dionne on NBC's Hullabaloo, which aired on March 30, 1965. Warwick also performed on Shivaree, which aired on July 17, 1965; she sang "We're Doing Fine" and "I Want to Be with You".

== Mercury recordings ==
In 1965, Warwick signed with Mercury Records, where she recorded with producer Ed Townsend for their subsidiary Blue Rock label, reaching the R&B Top 30 with "We're Doing Fine". It was on the Mercury label in 1966, that she had her biggest hit with "I Want to Be with You" from the Broadway show Golden Boy, a number 9 R&B hit, which just missed the pop-aimed Top 40 at number 41 (Nancy Wilson had reached number 54 with her version entitled "I Wanna Be with You" in 1964). The follow-up single was the original version of "I'm Gonna Make You Love Me" which, peaking at number 13 (R&B) and number 88 (Radio/Pop), was not Warwick's biggest hit, but became her best-known number by value of its later success as a duet between Motown's Diana Ross and The Supremes and The Temptations.

== Atco recordings ==
Warwick continued to record for Mercury through the late 1960s. Although her occasional success in the R&B field—notably the 1969 Ed Townsend production of Foolish Fool—was enough for the label to wish to re-sign her in 1970, she signed with Atco at the invitation of Atlantic Records president Jerry Wexler himself, Wexler having admired Warwick's early session work.

Warwick made her first recordings for Atco in February 1970, cutting four tunes with Townsend. In an early indication of the disarray that Warwick's career experienced at Atlantic, these tracks were shelved and she was sent to Criteria Studios in Miami in April to work with producer Dave Crawford and fast-emerging studio band, The Dixie Flyers. The resultant Turning Around album yielded a Top Ten R&B hit with "She Didn't Know", but Warwick never had another album release or single in the R&B Top 20.

In October, she cut 10 tracks at Muscle Shoals, again with Crawford producing (along with Brad Shapiro). Only three singles were released with one, a remake of "Suspicious Minds", becoming Warwick's penultimate R&B hit in 1971. That summer, Crawford and Shapiro produced an eight-track session for Warwick at Pac-Three studios in Detroit. One track, "Everybody's Got to Believe in Something", was issued as a single - Warwick's last release on Atco despite two final sessions for the label in early 1972. Reflecting on her unrewarding Atco tenure, Warwick opined: "The problem was simply, that the company had a lot of other big female acts - like Aretha Franklin and Roberta Flack - and you get into a situation, where you don't get the right kind of material or production or promotion..."

== Later career ==
Warwick returned to Mercury Records in 1973, but the following year she moved to Private Stock, where the 1975 single "Get Out of My Life" became her final charting song (number 73, R&B). That same year, she recorded for RCA Victor as DeDe Schwartz. After many years away from the recording studio, Warwick made her last recordings in the mid-1980s, releasing two albums: Dee Dee (Heritage Records, 1983), and Call Me (Sutra Records, 1984). In 1994, After living in Los Angeles for a number of years, she became a resident of Georgia.

Recordings from both her Mercury and Atco years are available on CD. In late 2006, she returned to success singing backup for her sister Dionne in concert, and was also part of the "Family First" song in the Tyler Perry-wrote 2007 film Daddy's Little Girls and its soundtrack album.

In January 2008, Warwick was featured in the title song of Dionne's gospel album Why We Sing. In February 2008, she sang backup vocals for Dionne's one-woman show My Music and Me in Europe.

== Awards ==
Dee Dee Warwick was nominated twice for a Grammy Award: in 1970 for "Foolish Fool" and in 1971 for "She Didn't Know". Both times the jury gave the prize in this category to Aretha Franklin.

Warwick received a Pioneer Award from the Rhythm and Blues Foundation in 1999 and was formally inducted into the National Rhythm & Blues Hall of Fame in 2023 joining her sister Dionne, cousin Whitney and aunt Cissy (Sweet Inspirations).

== Death ==
Warwick had congenital diabetes (type 1), and her health began to deteriorate in the 1990s. She suffered a stroke in 2008 and Dionne placed her in a nursing home, where she stayed for several months. Her sister was with her when she died aged 66, on October 18, 2008, in a nursing home in Essex County, New Jersey.

== Abuse allegations ==
The 2018 documentary film Whitney, directed by Kevin Macdonald, included allegations that Warwick had sexually molested cousin Whitney Houston and her brother Gary, when Whitney was "at a young age" and Gary was around eight years old, while Warwick was in her mid-to-late twenties. Warwick's sister, Dionne, Whitney's mother, Cissy, and Whitney's best friend Robyn Crawford expressed doubt regarding the truthfulness of the allegations.

== Discography ==
=== Albums ===
- I Want To Be With You / I'm Gonna Make You Love Me (1967)
- Foolish Fool (1969)
- Turning Around (1970)
- Dee Dee (1983)
- Call Me (1984)

=== Singles ===
- 1963: "You're No Good" (Jubilee) (No. 117 US)
- 1965: "Do It With All Your Heart" (Blue Rock) (No. 124 US)
- 1965: "We're Doing Fine" (Blue Rock) (No. 96 US, No. 28 R&B)
- 1965: "Gotta Get a Hold of Myself" (Blue Rock) (No. 40 Cash Box R&B)
- 1966: "I Want To Be With You" (Mercury) (No. 41 US, No. 9 R&B, No. 44 Can)
- 1966: "I'm Gonna Make You Love Me" (Mercury) (No. 88 US, No. 13 R&B)
- 1967: "When Love Slips Away" (Mercury) (No. 92 US, No. 43 R&B)
- 1969: "That's Not Love" (Mercury) (No. 106 US, No. 42 R&B)
- 1969: "Ring of Bright Water" (Mercury) (No. 113 US)
- 1969: "Foolish Fool" (Mercury) (No. 57 US, No. 14 R&B, No. 72 Can)
- 1970: "She Didn't Know (She Kept On Talking)" (Atco) (No. 70 US, No. 9 R&B, No. 64 Can)
- 1970: "Cold Night In Georgia" (Atco) (No. 44 R&B)
- 1971: "Suspicious Minds" (Atco) (No. 80 US, No. 24 R&B)
- 1975: "Get Out Of My Life" (Private Stock) (No. 73 R&B)
