= Gotta Get a Hold of Myself =

- US single label

Single by Dee Dee Warwick

from the album I Want To Be With You / I'm Gonna Make You Love Me
- B-side: "Another Lonely Saturday (Baby I'm Yours)"
- Released: October 1965
- Recorded: May 1965
- Genre: Soul
- Length: 2:50
- Label: Blue Rock
- Songwriters: Clint Ballard Jr.; Angela Riela
- Producer: Ed Townsend

Dee Dee Warwick singles chronology
"We're Doing Fine" (1965)	"Gotta Get a Hold of Myself" (1965)	"I Want To Be With You" (1966)

"Gotta Get a Hold of Myself" is a song written by Clint Ballard Jr. and Angela Riela. At the time, Ballard Jr. was enjoying success with British artists, and the song was initially recorded by Michael Haslam. Haslam, who was signed by the Beatles manger Brian Epstein, had his version produced by George Martin. Released as his first single on September 25, 1964, it failed to reach the charts despite promotion on television. In May 1965, "Gotta Get a Hold of Myself" was recorded by American soul singer Dee Dee Warwick. Released as a single in October 1965 through Blue Rock Records, her version reached number 40 on the Cash Box R&B Chart and number 141 on their Looking Ahead chart. It received favorable reviews in the press.

"Gotta Get a Hold of Myself" is primarily associated with a version recorded by British pop band the Zombies in 1966. Opening with a "ghost-like" organ by keyboardist Rod Argent, their arrangement is driven by Chris White's bass. The song was suggested to them by a friend at a time they were commercially unsuccessful, and it was recorded on May 4, 1966, at Lansdowne Studios in London with Ken Jones producing. Decca Records released the Zombies version as a single in the UK on September 23, 1966, with "The Way I Feel Inside" on the B-side. It was not a commercially successful rendition, and didn't receive US single release despite promotion on television. Critical reception was positive, with critics noting both the band's backing and Colin Blunstone's vocal performance. Retrospectively, it has been seen as one of the Zombies' greatest recordings.

== Background and original version ==
"Gotta Get a Hold of Myself" was a co-write; it was written by Clint Ballard Jr. together with Angela Riela. At the time, Ballard Jr. was enjoying success with compositions of his being made into by British artists, such as "The Game of Love" (Wayne Fontana and The Mindbenders) and "I'm Alive" (The Hollies). Thus, Gotta Get a Hold of Myself" was recorded by a British artist, singer Michael Haslam. Haslam, brother of Annie Haslam of Renaissance fame, was discovered by the Beatles manager Brian Epstein in Blackpool and subsequently signed with him. Produced by George Martin and featuring an arrangement written by Johnnie Spence and backing vocals by the Mike Sammes Singers, Haslam's version of "Gotta Get a Hold of Myself" was released through Parlophone on September 25, 1964. The B-side was "The Wind".

Although Haslam promoted "Gotta Get a Hold of Myself" on television, and was booked onto tour as a supporting act for the Beatles during their Christmas tour, the single failed to chart which radio host Spencer Leigh opined to it "not [being] catchy enough for the charts". Haslam recorded a second single, "There Goes The Forgotten Man" before being dropped by Epstein. Writing for Record Mirror, the staff reviewer believed the song featured a "simple backing", which eventually built up "through a ballad which could have come from Roy Orbison". Spence's arrangement was praised. They noted "distinct qualities" in Haslam's voice, but otherwise believed it would only take him to the "lower reaches, chart-wise".

== Dee Dee Warwick version ==
In 1965, American singer Dee Dee Warwick recorded a version of "Gotta Get a Hold of Myself" as a follow-up to her single "We're Doing Fine", which reached number 96 on the Billboard Hot 100. Having previously recorded the Clint Ballard Jr. composition "You're No Good" for Jubilee Records in 1963, A soul rendition, Warwick taped her rendition of "Gotta Get a Hold of Myself" in May 1965. The single was produced by Ed Townsend and arranged by Horace Ott. However, "Gotta Get a Hold of Myself" was not released as a single until October 1965, through Blue Rock Records. (Note: Catalogue number Blue Rock 4032A.) It failed to reach either the Billboard Hot 100 or the Hot Rhythm & Blues Singles chart, but reached number 40 on Cash Box's R&B chart and 141 on their "bubbling under" chart. It was also included on Warwick's album I Want To Be With You / I'm Gonna Make You Love Me. In the UK, the single was released through Mercury Records on December 17, 1965 to tie-in with her British tour; she appeared on the British television show Ready Steady Go on the day of the single's release.

In Cash Box, the staff reviewer wrote that Warwick had "splendid chance of creating a sales-storm on the basis" of the single, considering it "tip-top". They wrote that the song had a "slow-starting", which "dramatically" built up into a "pop-blues" lament about a "heartbroken gal who can’t get used to living without the guy who jilted her". Writing for the New Musical Express, Derek Johnson opined her rendition had a "big belt, modern-style crescendo" and praised the backing track as "compelling, yet unobstructive". Regarding Warwick's vocal performance on the track, Johnson characterized it as "rich and smoky" that was "trembling with emotion and sensitivity", which he stated was similar to her sister Dionne. Overall, it was a "very pleasant and listenable disc" for him.

=== Charts ===
Weekly chart performance for "Gotta Get a Hold of Myself"
Chart (1965)	Peak position
US Cash Box Looking Ahead	141
US Cash Box Top 50 R&B	40
US Record World Singles Coming Up	143

== The Zombies version ==
"Gotta Get a Hold of Myself"
- Danish picture sleeve

Single by The Zombies
- B-side: "The Way I Feel Inside"
- Released: September 23, 1966
- Recorded: May 4, 1966
- Studio: Lansdowne, London
- Length: 2:29
- Label: Decca
- Songwriters: Clint Ballard Jr.; Angela Riela
- Producer: Ken Jones

The Zombies UK singles chronology
"Indication" (1966)	"Gotta Get a Hold of Myself" (1966)	"Goin' Out of My Head" (1967)

Audio
- "Gotta Get a Hold of Myself" on YouTube

=== Recording and composition ===
In 1966, British pop band The Zombies recorded a version of "Gotta Get a Hold of Myself". According to AllMusic's Matthew Greenwald, the Zombies rendition of "Gotta Get a Hold of Myself" open with a "ghostly organ riff", with verses that evoked a "sense of minor-key melancholia" that contrasted to the refrain, which "explodes into a major-key celebration"; this in turn was something he felt was a trademark for the band, despite the single being an outside composition. Similarly, band biographer Emma Stott opines that Chris White's "twitchy, paranoid" bass "runs the song", with Hugh Grundy having taken a step back to allow White some prominence. Band biographer shares the sentiment of the track opening on a "ghostly organ sound", also adds that White's bass runs parallel to "progressively soaring [Colin] Blunstone vocal" that went "into potent Rod [Argent] and Chris [White] vocal harmonies". Stott felt that it was a good cover pick for the Zombies, opining that the pre-chorus evoked the melodrama of their prior hits "She's Not There" (1964).

By 1966, the band were starting to doubt their songwriting skills as a result of their "the devastating failures of their recent self-penned A-sides. (Note: All eight of the Zombies A-sides on Decca in the UK had been written by members Rod Argent or Chris White.) For the follow-up to the Argent-written single "Indication", their manager Tito Burns convinced the Zombies to record a cover, as he felt that they had "much more of a chance of getting a hit if you do somebody else's song". It is unclear on how the Zombies were introduced to "Gotta Get a Hold of Myself"; according to band biographer Claes Johansen, the band had first heard the song in April 1965, when they were on Dick Clark's American package tour together with Little Anthony and the Imperials. Stott states that the song was introduced to them by their producer Ken Jones. However, on the contrary, both Russo and Alec Palao believe it was introduced to the band by Mick Trounce, a friend from their native town St Albans, who owned a copy of the Dee Dee Warwick single. According to Argent, the band were discussing covers to record, and the band liked Warwick's recording and opted to do that.

For the first time in nearly six months, the Zombies entered a recording studio with the purpose of recording songs for release. (Note: Their previous recording session had been conducted on November 10, 1965 at Decca Studios in London and produced their single "Is This the Dream" (1965).) For Johansen, this reflected the bleakness the band had found themselves in; during the entirety of 1966, the band recorded only five songs, of which four were taped at this session. The session was held on May 4, 1966, at the Landsowne Studios in London, in contrast to their prior sessions that had all been held at the Decca Studios in West Hampstead. The change was suggested by producer Ken Jones during a conversation with Argent, who wanted the records to sound more "substantial". The session produced the four songs "Gotta Get a Hold of Myself", "I'll Call You Mine", "Indication" and "She Does Everything for Me", of which only the first was a cover. "Gotta Get a Hold of Myself" was taped in eight takes and was the third track recorded at the session, which was produced by Ken Jones and engineered by Adrian Kerridge.

=== Releases ===
The Zombies, 1966

In the UK, Decca Records released "Gotta Get a Hold of Myself" as a single on September 23, 1966. (Note: Catalogue number Decca F.12495.) The B-side of the track was "The Way I Feel Inside", an Argent-penned song which had been recorded in November 1964 and first released on the band's debut album Begin Here on April 9, 1965. Russo argued that this "indicated a lack of confidence in their output", since the Zombies had several unreleased recordings in the can. The single did not receive an American single release, as the band's American label Parrot Records passed on issuing it, citing both the commercial indifferences to their latest singles and "Gotta Get a Hold of Myself"s commercial failure in the UK as the reason. According to Ian Shirley of Record Collector, the single was one in a string of which he felt Decca were "keeping them on a threadmill", and that it represented Ken Jones trying to "recapture the hit formula of" "She's Not There". As with their previous single "Indication", "Gotta Get a Hold of Myself" was not a hit, something Russo opined was due to the "hollow-sounding mix" of the single.

The Zombies performed "Gotta Get a Hold of Myself" at the London Hippodrome, which was taped for broadcast on the US television show Hippodrome, which aired on July 12, 1966. The set, which featured "bizarre dancing of a troup of girls wafting feather boas like football scarfs", came to be a major source of embarrassment, especially for vocalist Colin Blunstone, who was "put 30 feet away from the band, with elephants and dancing girls going between us". Other versions of "Gotta Get a Hold of Myself" include one at the Playhouse Theatre for BBC Radio on November 1, 1966; it broadcast on Saturday Club on November 5. They also performed it on the Joe Loss Pop Show on October 14, 1966. In the UK, "Gotta Get a Hold of Myself" got its first album release on the compilation Rock Roots, issued by Decca on May 21, 1976. (Note: Catalogue number Decca ROOTS 2.) It has also appeared on the Big Beat Records box set Zombie Heaven , released on December 8, 1997. (Note: Catalogue number Big Beat ZOMBOX7.) The song received its first stereo mix in 2002, in a version which appeared on Big Beat Records' The Decca Stereo Anthology the same year. (Note: Catalogue number Big Beat CDWIK2 225.)

=== Critical reception ===
The single received positive reviews upon release. Writing for Disc and Music Echo, journalist Penny Valentine believed it was a "well made, beautifully competent record" from a group she thought was "talented, underrated, [and] in fact almost totally ignored". She further added that it was a "fierce little" song, praising Blunstone's vocal performance as "very desperate". Although she wanted "say with certainty" that it would become a hit, she just "didn't know" as they had made "good records in the past that have been overlooked". In the New Musical Express, Derek Johnson felt that "Gotta Get a Hold of Myself" contained "excitement galore" and was a "bluesy thumper" that built into a "shattering climax". He praised it as a "very distinctive treatment". For Norman Jopling and Peter Jones of Record Mirror, the Zombies were a group who made great discs that "often lost out", writing that "Gotta Get a Hold of Myself" was a big performance job of "sadness and loneliness". They added that it was "certainly worth a spin".

For Richie Unterberger of AllMusic, the song ranked among "the Zombies' finest work". Matthew Greenwald identified it as another great lost Zombies song. Ian Shirley opined that the song was amongst a row of Zombies singles that were "fantastic, inventive songs" that equalled the Beatles in scope and execution. Emma Stott believed that the arrangement and performance combined made "Gotta Get a Hold of Myself" the Zombies "most successful cover". On the contrary, Claes Johansen believes the Zombies recording of the song was not "particularly impressing", feeling that they felt "ludicrous" in the view of "all the classic Argent and White composition" that Decca had recorded but "quietly filed away".

=== Personnel ===
Personnel according to the book The Zombies: Every Album, Every Song, unless otherwise noted.

The Zombies

- Colin Blunstone – lead vocals
- Rod Argent – keyboards, backing vocals
- Chris White – bass guitar, backing vocals
- Paul Atkinson – guitar
- Hugh Grundy – drums

Other personnel

- Ken Jones – producer
- Adrian Kerridge – engineer
