= Still Got That Hunger =

Studio album by The Zombies
- Released: 9 October 2015
- Genre: Blues rock
- Length: 37:21
- Label: The End Records
- Producer: Christopher Marc Potter

The Zombies chronology
Breathe Out, Breathe In (2011)	Still Got That Hunger (2015)	Different Game (2023)

Professional ratings
Aggregate scores
Source	Rating
AnyDecentMusic?	5.3/10
Metacritic	61/100
Review scores
Source	Rating
AllMusic	3/5 stars
Consequence	C−
PopMatters	5/10
XS Noize	7/10
New Noise	Positive
Rolling Stone	3/5 stars

Still Got That Hunger is the sixth studio album by English rock band the Zombies, released on 9 October 2015. The band funded production of the album through the crowdfunding web site PledgeMusic, receiving donations from 958 pledgers and reaching 143% of its funding goal.

Two of the songs on the album are remakes of earlier recordings by members of the band. "I Want You Back Again" was originally released by the Zombies as a single in 1965 and in the intervening time has been covered in live performances by Tom Petty, a self-professed fan of the band. "Now I Know I'll Never Get Over You" was originally released by Colin Blunstone on his 2009 solo album The Ghost of You and Me.

Two of the songs also are based on two Argent compositions included in Barbara Thompson's Ghost (1982) album with Rod Argent, both instrumental, "Movin On" and "Little Girl," the latter renamed "Little One."

== Track listing ==
All tracks composed by Rod Argent, except where noted.

No.	Title	Writer(s)	Length
1.	"Moving On"		4:00
2.	"Chasing The Past"		4:05
3.	"Edge of the Rainbow"		4:10
4.	"New York"		4:08
5.	"I Want You Back Again" (2015)		3:34
6.	"And We Were Young Again"	Rod Argent, Catherine Argent	4:07
7.	"Maybe Tomorrow"		3:34
8.	"Now I Know I'll Never Get Over You"	Colin Blunstone	3:34
9.	"Little One"		2:54
10.	"Beyond the Borderline"		3:15

== Personnel ==
The Zombies

- Colin Blunstone - lead vocals
- Rod Argent - keyboards, backing and lead vocals
- Tom Toomey - guitar, backing vocals
- Jim Rodford - bass, backing vocals
- Steve Rodford - drums
