= Time of the Season =

Single by the British band The Zombies

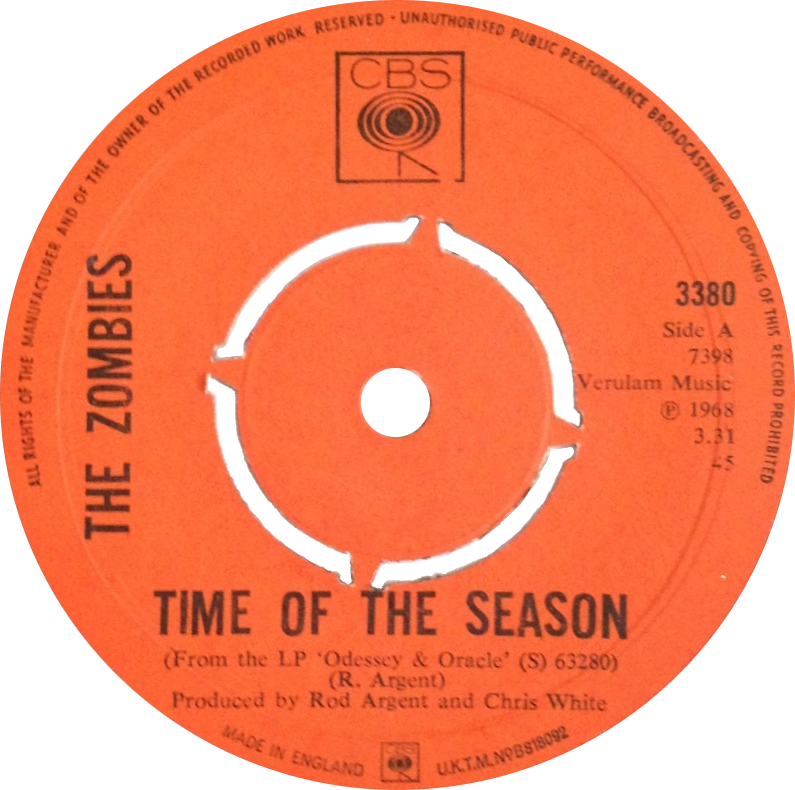
- Side A of 1968 UK single

Single by the Zombies

from the album Odessey and Oracle
- B-side: "I'll Call You Mine" (UK); "Friends of Mine" (US)
- Released: March 1968
- Recorded: 14 September 1967
- Studio: EMI, London
- Genre: Blue-eyed soul; psychedelic rock; psychedelic pop
- Length: 3:34
- Label: CBS (UK); Date (US)
- Songwriter: Rod Argent
- Producer: The Zombies

The Zombies singles chronology
"Care of Cell 44" (1967)	"Time of the Season" (1968)	"Butcher's Tale (Western Front 1914)" (1968)

Lyric video
- "The Zombies – 'Time Of The Season' (lyric video)" on YouTube

"Time of the Season" is a song by the English rock band the Zombies, featured as the final track of their 1968 album Odessey and Oracle. It was written by keyboardist Rod Argent and recorded at the EMI Abbey Road Studios in September 1967. Over a year after its original release, the track became a surprise hit in the United States, rising to number three on the Billboard Hot 100 and number one on the Cashbox chart. It has become one of the Zombies' most popular and recognisable songs, and an iconic hit of 1960s psychedelia.

== Song information ==
Several other songs from the Zombies' album Odessey and Oracle were released as singles prior to "Time of the Season". Columbia Records supported the album and its singles at the urging of new A&R representative Al Kooper. One of the singles issued on Columbia's Date label was the noncommercial-sounding "Butcher's Tale", which Columbia thought might catch on as an antiwar statement, at the time a popular trend. "Time of the Season" was released only at Kooper's urging, initially coupled with its original UK B-side, "I'll Call You Mine", without success. After previous singles flopped, Date re-released "Time of the Season" backed with another UK flop single, "Friends of Mine", and it made its breakthrough in early 1969, over a year after the band split up. It reached number three on the Billboard Hot 100 in March, topped the Cashbox chart, and reached number one in Canada. It did not chart in the band's native Britain, despite being re-released twice, but it later found fame there with Rod Argent saying that it became "a classic in the UK, but it's never been a hit." In mid-1969, it peaked at number two on the South African hit parade.

The song makes extensive use of call-and-response vocals (from singer Colin Blunstone) interwoven with fast-paced psychedelic keyboard improvisation by Argent. According to Argent, "I suggested the clap before the beat and a vocal sound after, which became the exhalation."

In 1998, Big Beat Records released a CD reissue of Odessey and Oracle containing both the original stereo and monoaural versions of "Time of the Season". It also featured a newly remixed alternative version containing instrumental backing underneath the vocals during the entire chorus. These instrumental backings had been mixed out on the original 1968 stereo and mono versions to create a cappella vocal sections. The outro is also different, with a different organ solo featuring only one organ, instead of the two interleaved organs in the original mix.

Milwaukee's Third Coast Daily.com called the song "something of a counterculture anthem".

In 2012, NME named the track the 35th-best song of the 1960s. In 2021, it was ranked at No. 349 on Rolling Stone's list of the "500 Greatest Songs of All Time". Ultimate Classic Rock critic Michael Gallucci rated it as the Zombies' 2nd greatest song, stating that it "is both timeless and of its time – which sorta explains why a song recorded during the Summer of Love became a hit in the way different musical climate of 1969."

== Personnel ==
Partial credits from Richard Buskin and Rod Argent.

- Colin Blunstone – lead and backing vocals
- Rod Argent – Hammond L100 organ, backing vocals, sound effect
- Chris White – bass, backing vocals
- Paul Atkinson – guitar, backing vocals
- Hugh Grundy – drums, backing vocals

== Charts ==
=== Weekly charts ===
Chart (1969)	Peak position
Australia (Kent Music Report)	43
Belgium (Ultratop 50 Wallonia)	44
Canada Top Singles (RPM)	1
Netherlands (Dutch Top 40)	12
Netherlands (Single Top 100)	14
South Africa (Springbok)	2
US Billboard Hot 100	3
US Cash Box Top 100	1

=== Year-end charts ===
Chart (1969)	Rank
Canada	19
US Billboard Hot 100	39
US Cash Box Top 100	15

== Certifications ==
Region	Certification	Certified units/sales
United Kingdom (BPI) Sales since 2007	Gold	400,000^{‡}
United States (RIAA)	Gold	1,000,000^{^}
^{^} Shipments figures based on certification alone.^{‡} Sales+streaming figures based on certification alone.

== Cover versions ==
The song has been covered many times by other bands in recordings, including:

- In 1969, the Thyme covered "Time of the Season" for A-Square Records.
- Brent Bourgeois covered the song on his 1990 self-titled solo debut album.
- Michael Damian covered the song as the title track of his 1994 LP.
- In 1994, Canadian a capella group the Nylons recorded a cover of the song for their album Because...
- In 1997, Kurt Elling recorded a jazz version on the album The Messenger.
- In 2018, Hawaiian ukulele artist Jake Shimabukuro covered the song on his album The Greatest Day.
