= Sebastián Santa María =

Musical artist (1959-1996)

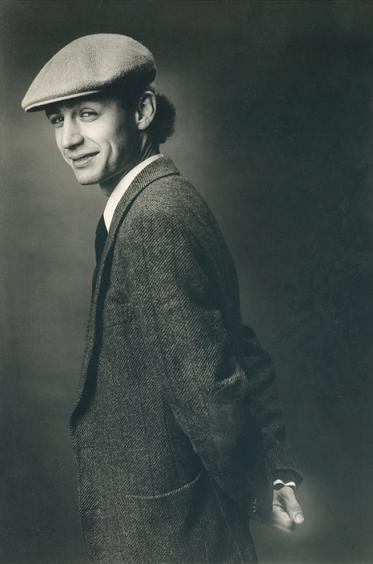
- Santa Maria, 1983

Background information
- Born: 24 September 1959; Santiago, Chile
- Died: 20 October 1996 (aged 37) Lausanne, Switzerland
- Genres: Soft rock Jazz

Sebastián Santa María Pérez (September 24, 1959 – October 20, 1996) was a Chilean-Swiss musician. He was born in 1959 in Santiago, Chile, but settled in Lausanne, Switzerland at age 17.

He played the piano in several clubs in Lausanne until beginning a fertile career as a composer, composing a number of songs including some made for Catherine Lara, Bernard Lavilliers, for Viktor Lazlo's album My Delicious Poisons and Isabelle Adjani.

Besides these composing activities, he also played numerous piano duet jazz concerts with François Lindemann, and a few years later, he founded with Lindemann a unique group of seven Steinways called Piano Seven.

He also participated in the reincarnation of British band The Zombies, playing on their 1991 album, New World. As a solo artist, he released a few singles and one full-length album (Latino, 1994). A second album, Corpus, was released posthumously in 1997.

Santa María died of adrenoleukodystrophy in 1996 in Lausanne.
