= Paul Atkinson (guitarist) =

British musician (1946–2004)

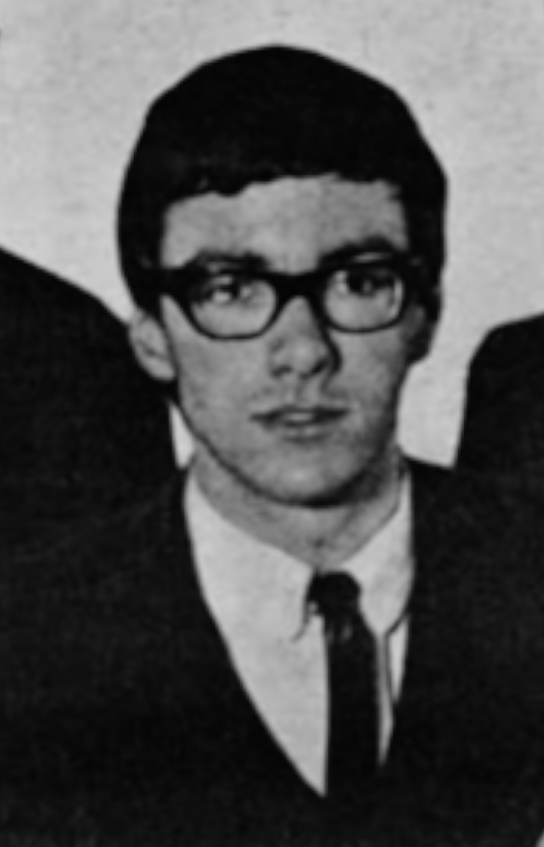

Background information
- Born: Paul Ashley Warren Atkinson; 19 March 1946; Cuffley, Hertfordshire, England
- Died: 1 April 2004 (aged 58) Santa Monica, California, U.S.
- Occupations: Musician, A&R executive
- Instrument: Guitar
- Years active: 1958–2004

Paul Ashley Warren Atkinson (19 March 1946 – 1 April 2004) was a British guitarist and record company executive, most notable as a founding member of the pop/rock band The Zombies. Atkinson was posthumously inducted into the Rock and Roll Hall of Fame in 2019.

== Early life and education ==
Paul Atkinson was born in Cuffley, Hertfordshire on 19 March 1946, son of Stanley Atkinson, a stockbroker's accountant who worked in the City of London, and Clyde, a teacher of English, languages, and secretarial skills courses at a technical college. When he was nine, the family moved to St Albans. He was educated at St Albans School, and contemplated going into the Diplomatic Service like several members of his family, or studying anthropology. Having passed the requisite A-levels, he enrolled at Newcastle University, but having met with musical success did not continue his studies.

== The Zombies ==
At St Albans, Atkinson met Rod Argent and Hugh Grundy, and the three formed a band initially called the Mustangs, later changed to The Zombies. Colin Blunstone and Paul Arnold joined the new band in mid 1958, but Arnold soon left and was replaced by Chris White. After the group won a local contest, they recorded a demo as their prize. Argent's song "She's Not There" got them a deal with Decca Records and was a hit in the UK and US.

An album, Begin Here (renamed to The Zombies when released in the US) would follow. They would appear on American television for the first time on January 12 1965, when they appeared on the first episode of Hullabaloo.

The Zombies would have another chart-topper in 1964 with "Tell Her No". The group continued to record successfully through the mid-1960s, but disbanded in December 1967, reportedly over management disagreements. A second album was released in 1968 titled Odessey and Oracle, which featured the song "Time of the Season", one of the Zombies' most successful singles.

== Later works ==
Following the disbandment of the Zombies in early 1968, Atkinson enjoyed a brief stint as a computer programmer before returning to the music industry. He began by managing a number of unsuccessful bands before joining Dick James Music in 1969. While working as a talent scout, Atkinson came across aspiring singer-songwriter Joan Armatrading in the London production of Hair. Despite his recommendation, James refused to sign her, prompting Atkinson to leave the company and, along with Grundy, join CBS Records UK as an A&R man in 1972. There he succeeded in signing the then-unknown Swedish group ABBA for only £1,000 in advance. Atkinson also introduced Philadelphia International Records in the UK, managing the promotions for Bruce Springsteen among other American acts. He discovered and signed such acts as Elton John, ABBA, Bruce Hornsby, Mr. Mister, Michael Penn and Grayson Hugh, who Atkinson brought to MCA Records from RCA Records in 1991.

In January 2004 Atkinson received the President's Merit Award from the National Academy of Recording Arts and Sciences at a benefit concert at the House of Blues in Los Angeles. The Zombies reunited for the event.

== Death ==
Atkinson died at the age of 58 in a Santa Monica hospital due to liver and kidney disease on 1 April 2004. He had been suffering from cancer for some time, and had two liver transplants.

Atkinson was posthumously inducted into the Rock and Roll Hall of Fame in 2019.

== Discography ==
=== The Zombies ===
==== Studio albums ====
- Begin Here (UK) / The Zombies (US) (1965)
- Odessey and Oracle (1968)

==== EPs ====
- The Zombies (1964)

==== Singles ====
Title	Year	Peak chart positions						Certifications	Album (A-side only)
Title	Year	UK	AUS	CAN	NL	US Billboard	US Cashbox	Certifications	Album (A-side only)
"She's Not There" b/w "You Make Me Feel Good"	1964	12	11	2	—	2	1		Begin Here / The Zombies
"Leave Me Be" b/w "Woman"	1964	—	81	—	—	—	—		Non album single
"Tell Her No" UK & AUS b/w "What More Can I Do?" US & CAN b/w "Leave Me Be"	1964	42	60	6	—	6	6		The Zombies
"She's Coming Home" b/w "I Must Move"	1965	—	—	21	—	58	48		Non album singles
"I Want You Back Again" b/w "I Remember When I Loved Her"	1965	—	—	—	—	95	92 / 122		Non album singles
"Whenever You're Ready" b/w "I Love You"	1965	—	—	—	—	110	114		Non album singles
"Just Out of Reach" b/w "Remember You"	1965	—	—	—	—	113	110		Non album singles
"Is This the Dream?" b/w "Don't Go Away"	1966	—	—	—	—	—	—		Non album singles
"Indication" b/w "How We Were Before"	1966	—	—	—	—	—	—		Non album singles
"Gotta Get a Hold of Myself" b/w "The Way I Feel Inside"	1966	—	—	—	—	—	—		Non album singles
"Goin' Out of My Head" b/w "She Does Everything for Me"	1967	—	—	—	—	—	—		Non album singles
"Friends of Mine" b/w "Beechwood Park"	1967	—	—	—	—	—	—		Odessey and Oracle
"Care of Cell 44" b/w "Maybe After He's Gone"	1967	—	—	—	—	—	—		Odessey and Oracle
"Time of the Season" b/w "I'll Call You Mine" b/w "Friends of Mine" (1969 US re-release)	1968	—	43	1	14	3	1	BPI: Silver; RIAA: Gold	Odessey and Oracle
"I Love You" b/w "The Way I Feel Inside"	1968	—	—	—	—	—	—		Non album single
"Butcher's Tale (Western Front 1914)" b/w "This Will Be Our Year"	1968	—	—	—	—	—	—		Odessey and Oracle
"Imagine the Swan" b/w "Conversation Off Floral Street"	1969	—	—	59	—	109	77		Non album singles
"If It Don't Work Out" b/w "Don't Cry For Me"	1969	—	—	—	—	—	—		Non album singles
"—" denotes singles that did not chart or were not released in that region.
