= Care of Cell 44 =

Single by the Zombies

from the album Odessey and Oracle
- B-side: "Maybe After He's Gone"
- Released: 20 November 1967
- Recorded: 16–17 August 1967
- Studio: EMI, London
- Genre: Psychedelic pop; baroque pop; sunshine pop
- Length: 3:53
- Label: Date Records
- Songwriter: Rod Argent
- Producer: The Zombies

The Zombies UK singles chronology
| "Friends of Mine" (1967) | "Care of Cell 44" (1967) | "Time of the Season" (1968) |

The Zombies US singles chronology
| "Indication" (1966) | "Care of Cell 44" (1967) | "Time of the Season" (1968) |

Lyric video
- "Care of Cell 44" on YouTube

"Care of Cell 44" is a single by the Zombies, released as the lead single from their album Odessey and Oracle in November 1967. It was featured on Pitchfork's "200 Best Songs of the 1960s" list, and has been covered by modern artists including Elliott Smith and Of Montreal.

== Composition ==
"Care of Cell 44" is written in 4/4 time in the key of G major, although arts journalist Matt Kivel identifies numerous modulations between key centers in the song. Following a short harpsichord intro, the first verse begins with only harpsichord, lead vocals, and drums before gradually introducing the bass guitar and Mellotron, which emulates a strings sound. Commentators have highlighted Chris White's countermelodic bassline, with biographer Claes Johansen comparing it to the bass playing of Paul McCartney. The backing vocals, which enter during the second verse, sing a cappella during the repeated break in a style similar to the Beach Boys. Kivel describes the music as a "sprightly piano jingle."

The song's lyrics are written in the form of a letter from a lover to their imprisoned partner, anticipating their reunion. Songwriter Rod Argent said: "It just appealed to me. That twist on a common scenario, I just can't wait for you to come home to me again". John Motley has described the song as "the sunniest song ever written about the impending release of a prison inmate."

== Recording history ==
"Care of Cell 44" was recorded under the working title of "Prison Song" in four takes on 16 August 1967. The master recording was completed on 17 August 1967 with a take 5 reduction of take 4. Take 1 was a false start, and take 2 was a complete take of the backing track. Both of these outtakes were issued as a bonus track on the thirtieth anniversary CD edition of Odessey and Oracle in 1998 by Big Beat Records. The song was initially retitled "Care Of Cell 69", but Al Gallico, the Zombies' American publisher, rejected this title due to the sexual subtext of the number 69.

== Reception ==
The 1967 single release of "Care of Cell 44" was not a success, causing some of the tension that led to the breakup of the band in December of that year. Vocalist Colin Blunstone said to Mojo in 2008 that he "thought that 'Care of Cell 44' was incredibly commercial" and "was really disappointed when it wasn't a hit." Subsequent reappraisal of the album, following the success of the "Time of the Season" single the following year and the album's later cult following, has led to the track becoming much more popular.

AllMusic critic Matthew Greenwald called it a "breezy, infectious pop melody" with "choral harmony breaks," singling out Chris White's "melodic" bass playing for praise and favorably comparing it to the work of Brian Wilson and Paul McCartney. Matt Kivel claims that "Care of Cell 44" "slyly redefined the lyrical conventions of a modern pop song." Music critic Antonio Mendez called it one of the "sublime" songs on Odessey and Oracle.

In 2006, Pitchfork listed "Care of Cell 44" as the 98th best song of the 1960s, with John Motley praising its "lush arrangement and ecstatic melodies". Ultimate Classic Rock critic Michael Gallucci rated it as the Zombies' fourth greatest song, calling it "a glowing ray of psychedelia-kissed sunshine."

== Personnel ==
According to band biographer Claes Johansen:

- Colin Blunstone – lead and backing vocals
- Rod Argent – harpsichord, Mellotron, backing vocals
- Chris White – bass guitar, backing vocals
- Hugh Grundy – drums

== Cover versions ==
- Elliott Smith performed "Care of Cell 44" in concert.
- Matthew Sweet and Susanna Hoffs covered the song on their 2006 covers album Under the Covers, Vol. 1.
- Beth Sorrentino covered the song on Hiding Out.
- The Chrysanthemums covered the song on their 1989 "full album cover" of Odessey and Oracle.

== Bibliography ==
- Johansen, Claes (2001). The Zombies: Hung Up on a Dream: A Biography - 1962-1967. London: SAF Publishing. ISBN 978-0-946719-34-1.
- Russo, Greg (1999). Time of the Season: The Zombies Collector's Guide. Floral Park, NY: Crossfire Publications. ISBN 978-0-9648157-5-9.
