= Friends of Mine (The Zombies song) =

- British single label

Single by the Zombies

from the album Odessey and Oracle
- A-side: "Time of the Season" (US)
- B-side: "Beechwood Park" (UK)
- Released: 22 September 1967
- Recorded: 1 June 1967
- Studio: EMI, London
- Genre: Jangle pop; pop
- Length: 2:22
- Label: CBS
- Songwriter: Chris White
- Producer: The Zombies

The Zombies UK singles chronology
"Goin' Out of My Head" (1967)	"Friends of Mine" (1967)	"Care of Cell 44" (1967)

Lyric video
- "Friends of Mine" on YouTube

"Friends of Mine" is a song written by British bassist Chris White and recorded by his band the Zombies. Following a tour of the Philippines, the Zombies were dropped by Decca Records. They turned to CBS, who signed the band and gave them artistic control over their music, allowing them to produce an album by themselves. "Friends of Mine" was recorded on 1 June 1967 at EMI Studios in London, together with audio engineers Peter Vince and Geoff Emerick. Vocalist Colin Blunstone made a mistake when singing, and the band left it in the track. Musically, the song was inspired by the Beatles and was written in a major key, containing unorthodox chord changes and open guitar chords. Lyrically, the song is about various couples that the Zombies knew, including their guitarist Paul Atkinson alongside bassist Jim Rodford.

CBS released "Friends of Mine" as the Zombies first single on the label, with "Beechwood Park" on the B-side. Despite the band performing the song live and on radio, it failed to chart, which contributed to it not receiving a US release and the Zombies breaking up in December 1967. "Friends of Mine" was later released on the Zombies second album Odessey and Oracle on 19 April 1968, and as the B-side of "Time of the Season" in the US on 30 December 1968. Upon release, the song received positive reviews in the British press, with a praise towards the vocal performance on the song. Retrospectively, the song has also received widespread praise, with one critic arguing it set the blueprint for jangle pop.

== Background ==
In March 1967, having just returned from a tour of the Philippines, the Zombies had found themselves at the lowest point of their career. After releasing the tenth single by the band, a cover of Little Anthony and the Imperials' "Goin' Out of My Head", the band was dropped by Decca Records due to diminished chart success, compared to their previous recordings. Having been unsatisfied with the work of their producer Ken Jones, the band had sought to record an album produced by themselves, declining offers by the Hollies and John Lennon to produce their future output. One of their managers, Joe Roncoroni, arranged a meeting with CBS A&R man Derek Everett and secured the band a contract with the label. In addition to being allowed to produce the album themselves, the Zombies also received creative control over their music, access to EMI Studios and an advance of £1,000 to record it without any time constraints.

== Recording and composition ==
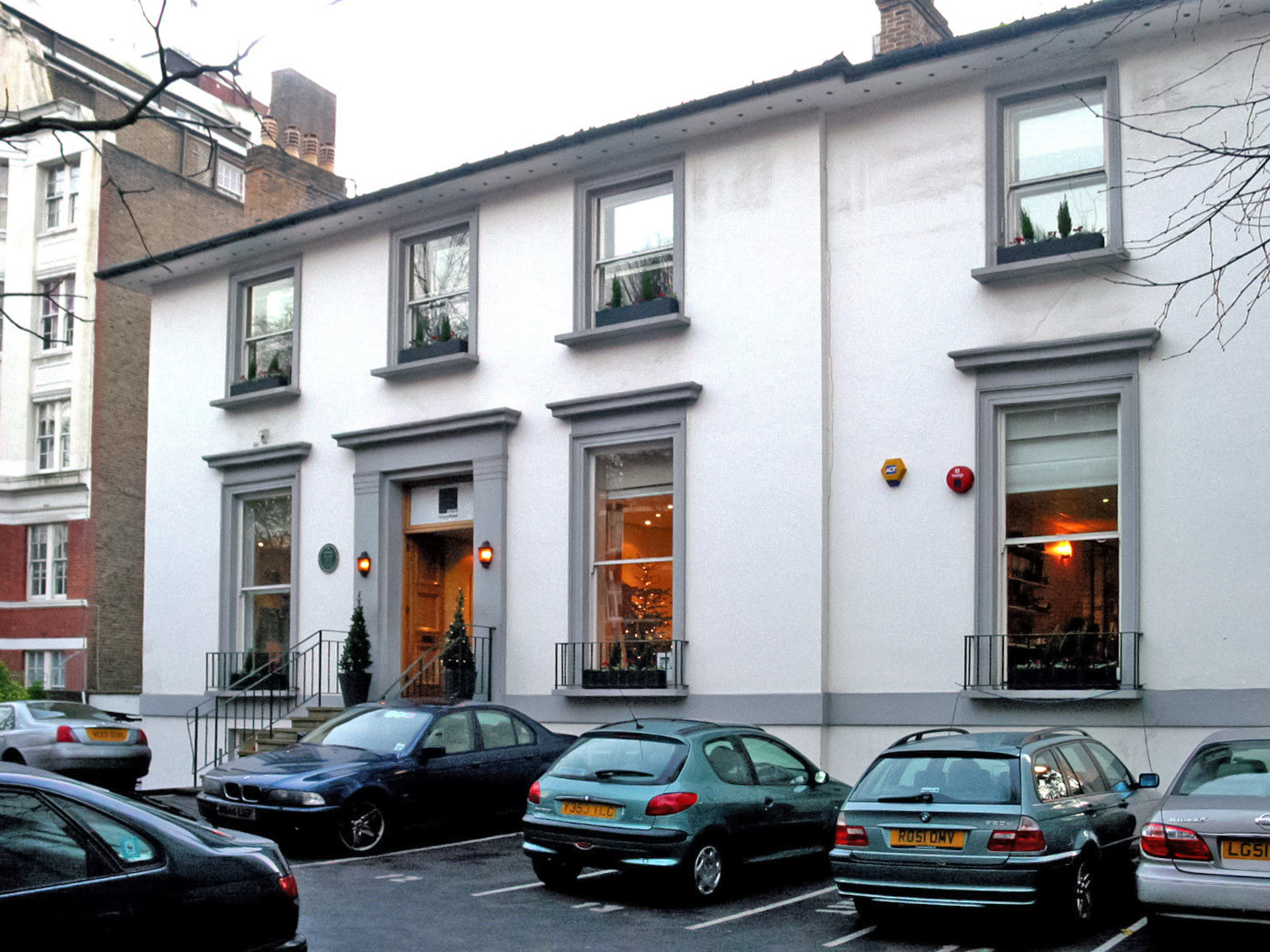
"Friends of Mine" was recorded at EMI Studios in London.

"Friends of Mine" was the first track the Zombies recorded for Odessey and Oracle on 1 June 1967 at EMI Studios in London, shortly after the Beatles had finished recording Sgt. Pepper's Lonely Hearts Club Band there. The backing track for "A Song For Emily" was also cut on that date. Because the band's budget was tight during recording, they rehearsed their songs outside of the studio before recording them. Present in the studio with the Zombies were audio engineers Peter Vince and Geoff Emerick, both of whom contributed to drummer Hugh Grundy "getting a great drum sound" on the track. Take 10 became the master. The song's mono and stereos version are different and feature different mixes.

Musically, "Friends of Mine" drew inspiration from the Beatles, and was written in major-key. Several sources identify it as a pop song, whilst Fred Thomas of AllMusic believed the song to be jangle pop. Claes Johansen opined the song's opening guitar riff was inspired by Roger McGuinn which brought a feeling of Swinging London. According to him, "Friends of Mine" was a typical composition in the "Zombies tradition", and featured a descending bassline and "unorthodox chord changes". Thomas further adds that it contains "simple open guitar chords and peppy rhythms". During the song's instrumental break, keyboardist Rod Argent performs a brief descending piano riff. The song's backing vocals, which biographer Greg Russo described as "choirlike in spots", drew inspiration from White's experiences with mediation.

Vocally, Colin Blunstone performs the track in an airy, endearing manner. At the end of "Friends of Mine", Blunstone sung a short "ahh" by accident, with White further adding that they left it in the track because he believed in "accidents during recording". On the contrary, Blunstoned stated that he intentionally added it because it "lent at least a little bit of irony" to the song he thought was "a little bit sweet". Lyrically, the song namechecks various couples from the point of view of a narrator, which Johansen writes adds a "certain melancholy" to the lyrics despite the overall spirit was "positive". White recalled in Mojo that the band "sat around and came up with different friends at rehearsal to see if we could fit them all in". All of the couples mentioned in the track were real, including Liz Evans and Brian Baldwin, the latter of which Blunstone went to school with and acted as the best man for. The band's guitarist Paul Atkinson and his wife Molly Molloy are also named in the track, as is Jim Rodford. Matthew Greenwald believed this was "not dissimilar" to the Beach Boys "Surfin' U.S.A." (1963), though "certainly more personal".

== Release ==
CBS Records released "Friends of Mine" as the Zombies first single on the label in the United Kingdom on 22 September 1967, with "Beechwood Park" on the B-side. (Note: Catalogue number CBS 2960.) Both sides of the single were written by White, something Russo considered "unusual". The release date co-incided with Atkinson and Molloy's engagement. There is evidence to suggest the Zombies performed "Friends of Mine" live during their performances at this stage, alongside "Care of Cell 44" and "A Rose For Emily", but they were not well-received by audiences. Despite being performed live and promoted on radio, "Friends of Mine" failed to chart, which Thomas Curtis-Horsfall speculates was due to "its overly saccharine sentiment" of celebrating other people's relationships. The track was met with "such disinterest" that it never received a single release in the United States, and "Care of Cell 44" was released as a single less than two months later.

"Friends of Mine" was also recorded for an appearance on The David Symonds Show in mid-October 1967, and this version was also broadcast on the 17 November edition of Top of the Pops. The chart failure of "Friends of Mine" and "Care of Cell 44" was part of the reason the Zombies broke up, and the band performed their final gig together in Hereford on 20 December 1967. "Friends of Mine" was included on the band's posthumous second studio Odessey and Oracle in the UK on 19 April 1968, where it is sequenced as the penultimate track between "Butcher's Tale (Western Front 1914)" and "Time of the Season". (Note: Catalogue number CBS CBS 63280 (mono), CBS S63280 (stereo).) In the US, "Friends of Mine" was also issued as the B-side for the second re-issue of "Time of the Season" by Date Records on 30 December 1968. (Note: Catalogue number Date 1628.) The song has also appeared on several compilation albums, including Time of the Zombies (1974) and Zombie Heaven (1997), alongside various CD re-issues of Odessey and Oracle.

== Reception and legacy ==
Contemporary reception of the single was fairly positive. In Disc and Music Echo, journalist Penny Valentine wrote that the Zombies always surfaced "as fresh and crisp as daisies". She noted the track as a "jolly thing about love" and praised Blunstone's vocal performance as "very pretty and everything solid and American". Writing for the New Musical Express, John Wells wrote that the band made "excellent use of their harmony talents" on the "driving number" and hoped it would become the "break" the band were looking for. Peter Jones of Record Mirror opinioned that the track was "surely commercial" and a "strong start" for their CBS recording contract. He described the song's vocal line as "nice", praising it as "big and confident".

Retrospectively, Fred Thomas opinioned that "Friends of Mine" was one of several examples of Odessey and Oracle tracks with "melodic rock that would go on to become its own subgenre", arguing it set "the blueprint for jangle pop on the whole". Greemwald stated it was a "wonderfully breezy pop statement" and one of "several masterful, up-tempo pieces" on the album. Johansen praised the track for the "tasteful keyboard and guitar playing", spirited drumming and the "superb vocal performances". Gold Radio placed the song at in the top-ten of their list of best Zombies tracks, as did Joe Lynch of Billboard magazine, who commented it to be a "jaunty, ebullient ode to relationship bliss" and believed Blunstone's "selfless sincerity" in his vocal performance make up for the saccharine, yet novel lyrics.

== Personnel ==
Personnel according to band biographer Claes Johansen.

- Colin Blunstone – lead and backing vocals
- Rod Argent – piano, backing vocals
- Chris White – bass, backing vocals
- Hugh Grundy – drums
- Paul Atkinson – electric guitar
