= Blue Rock Records =

American record label

Blue Rock Records was an American record label, a subsidiary of Mercury Records, and like their parent, based in Chicago between 1964 and 1969. Blue Rock, headed by Carl Proctor, was an attempt by major label Mercury to enter the burgeoning soul music market. The label produced records in-house as well as releasing efforts produced independently. The in-house producers were based in Chicago and New York.

One artist signed to the label was Chicagoan Otis Leavill, who released 4 singles on the label, including "Let Her Love Me" (1964), one of the label's few national hits, reaching #29 on the Cashbox R&B chart in February, 1965. Another artist signed to the label who received a modicum of success was Dee Dee Warwick, sister of Dionne Warwick, who hit with "We're Doing Fine" in 1965. The same year, Blue Rock released a version of "Mustang Sally" by its author, Sir Mack Rice.

The imprint was put on hiatus in 1966 but was relaunched in 1968. Jack Daniels was put in charge of A&R and production, but by 1970, the label was once again discontinued.

Joyce Kennedy ("I'm a Good Girl"), Tony Diamond, Johnnie Mae Matthews, Little Rose Little, Big Tim & The Empires, Janeen Henry, Big Frank & The Essences, Johnny Moore, Kenny Carlton, Bobby Hutton, The Commotions, Brothers Of Love, Johnny & Jake, Shirley Wahls & Spouse, Renaldo Domino and Dizzy Jones were also on the roster.

The 1990s double compilation album of the label's output, Lost and Found: The Blue Rock Records Story, is out of print.

== See also ==
- List of record labels
