= The Zombies =

English rock band

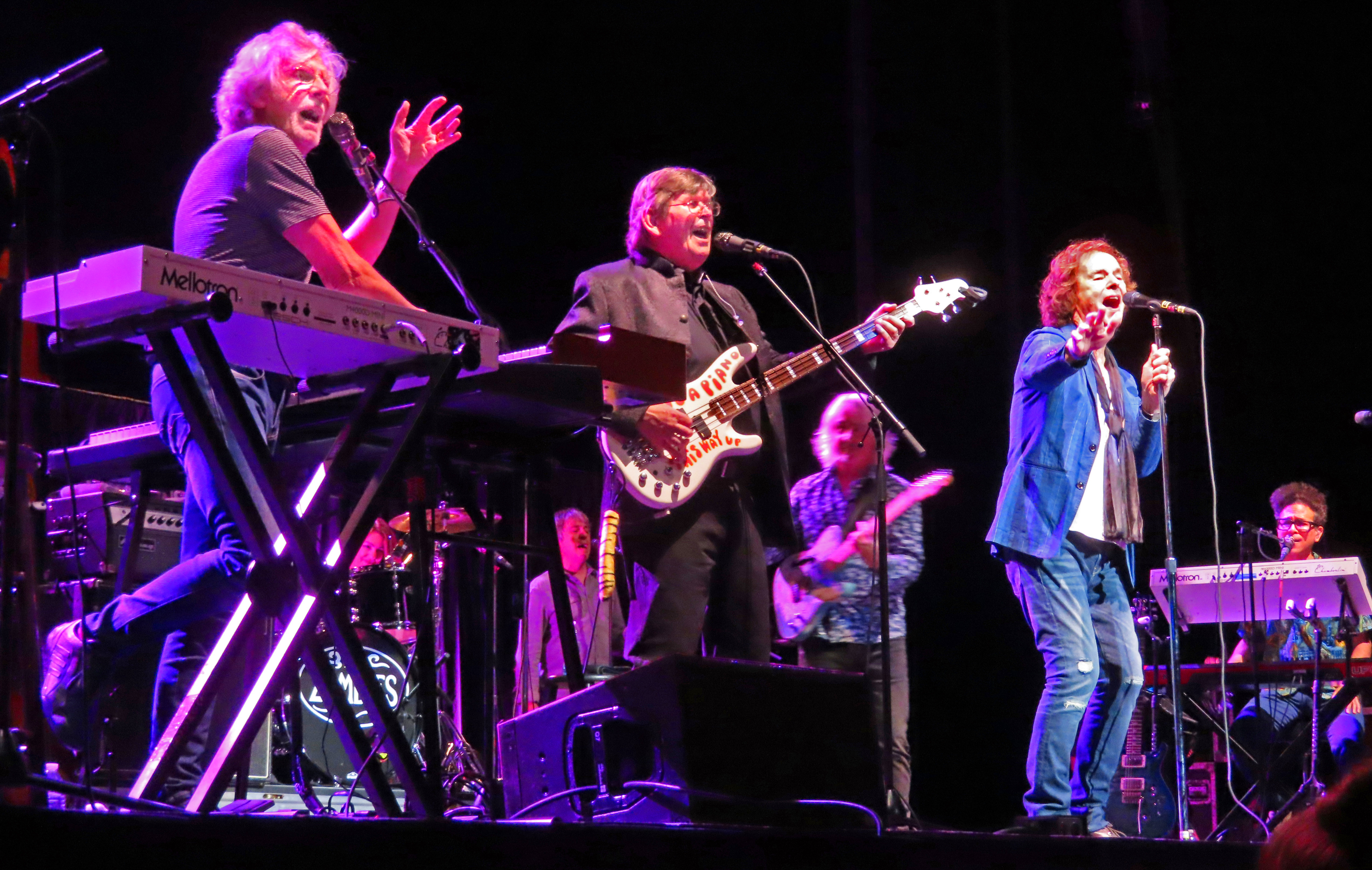
- The Zombies performing in September 2019

Background information
- Origin: St Albans, Hertfordshire, England
- Genres: Rock; baroque pop; psychedelia; beat; R&B
- Years active: 1962–1967; 1968; 1989–1991; 1997; 2004–2024; 2026
- Labels: Parrot; Date; Decca; CBS; Tower; Red House Records; The End; Cooking Vinyl
- Spinoffs: Argent
- Past members: Rod Argent; Colin Blunstone; Paul Atkinson; Hugh Grundy; Paul Arnold; Chris White; Rick Birkett; Russ Ballard; Jim Rodford; Bob Henrit; Mark Johns; Sebastian Santa Maria; Keith Airey; Darian Sahanaja; Steve Rodford; Tom Toomey; Søren Koch
- Website: thezombiesmusic.com

The Zombies were an English rock band formed in St Albans in 1962. Led by keyboardist/vocalist Rod Argent and lead vocalist Colin Blunstone, the group had their first British and American hit in 1964 with "She's Not There". In the US, two further singles—"Tell Her No" in 1965 and "Time of the Season" in 1968—were also successful.

Their 1968 album Odessey and Oracle was ranked number 100 on Rolling Stone's 2012 list of the 500 Greatest Albums of All Time, and number 243 on Rolling Stone's 2020 list. The Zombies were inducted into the Rock and Roll Hall of Fame in 2019.

== History ==
=== 1961–1964 ===
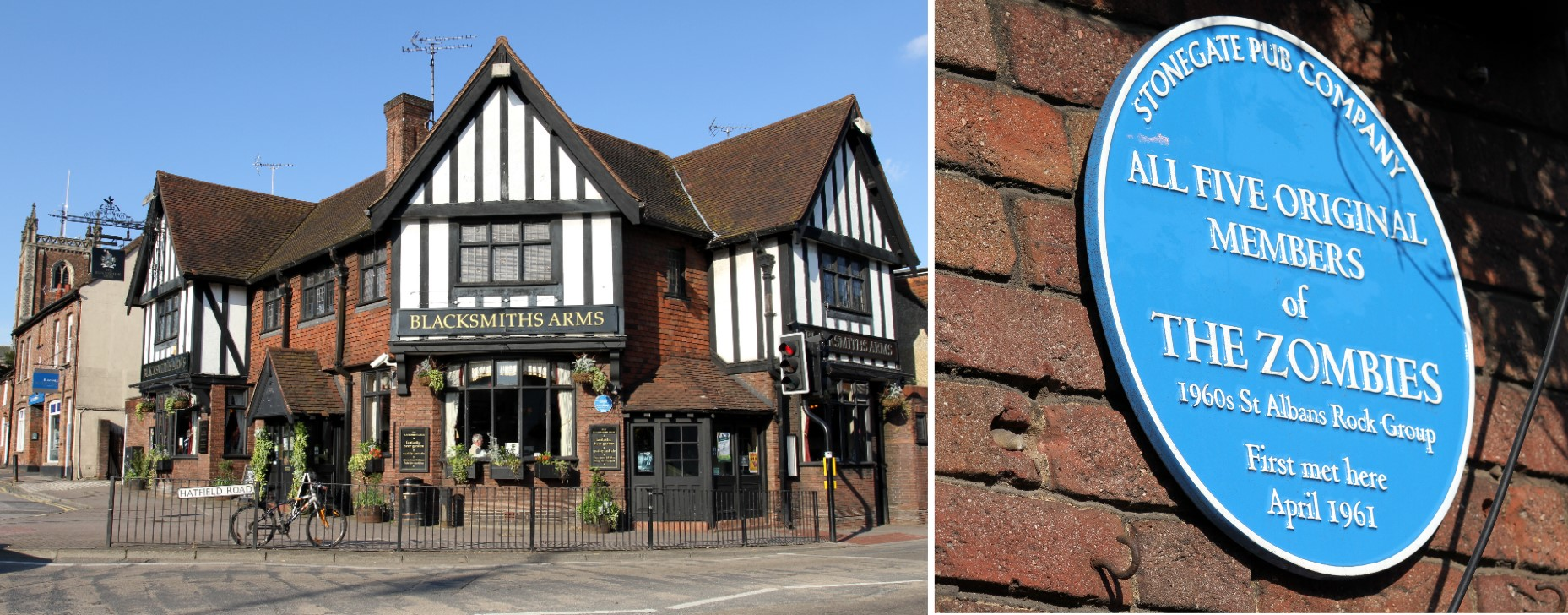
The Blacksmiths Arms public house in St Albans, Hertfordshire, where the Zombies first met

Three members of the band, Rod Argent, Paul Atkinson and Hugh Grundy, first came together to jam in 1961 in St Albans, Hertfordshire. Argent wanted to form a band and initially asked his elder cousin Jim Rodford to join as a bassist. At the time, Rodford was in a successful local band, the Bluetones, and so declined, but he offered to help Argent. Rodford would later join Argent in 1969, as well as The Zombies in 2004 when the band reformed. Colin Blunstone and Paul Arnold joined the other three to form the band in early 1962 while all five members were at school.

Some sources state that Argent, Atkinson and Grundy were at St Albans School, while Blunstone and Arnold were students at St Albans Boys' Grammar School. Both Blunstone and Grundy came from Hatfield and both sang in the choir there at St Etheldreda's Church. Argent was a boy chorister in St Albans Cathedral Choir. They held their original rehearsals at the Pioneer Club, then situated on Hatfield Road, using equipment lent to them by the Bluetones. They met outside the Blacksmiths Arms pub in St Albans before their first rehearsal and gained their initial reputation playing the Old Verulamians Rugby Club there.

Argent said, "We met outside a pub. We were too young to walk in the pub." Blunstone added "I was literally in a corner singing to myself, doing a Ricky Nelson song, and Rod came over and said, 'That's really good. I'll tell you what. If you'll be the lead singer, I'll play keyboards.'"

=== Origin of band name ===
Originally named the "Mustangs", the band soon realised that other groups had that name. According to Blunstone, "Every young band wants an original name. We were just in our teens. We tried the Mustangs. To be honest, I didn’t really know what a zombie was". "It was Arnold who came up with "the Zombies". Argent said "Well, we chose that name in 1962 and, I mean, I knew vaguely that they were: sort of, you know, the Walking Dead from Haiti and Colin didn't even really know what they were". "It was Paul [Arnold] that came up with the name. I don't know where he got it from. He very soon left the band after that". Arnold explained the name, saying, "I thought this was a name that no one else is going to have. And I just liked the whole idea of it. Colin was wary, I'm sure, at the beginning, I know, but I always, always really, really liked it".

Arnold lost interest in the band, choosing to leave to become a physician; he was replaced by Chris White, a friend of Arnold's older brother Terry. As Atkinson later described: "[Arnold] wasn't terribly dedicated. He liked the idea of being in a group, and he liked playing bass, but to be honest [he] was a little lazy. He didn't like to rehearse very much."

=== Recording contract ===
In May 1964 the band won a £250 cash prize in a beat-group competition organised by the Watford Borough Council and sponsored by the London Evening News. They signed a recording contract with Decca and recorded their first hit, "She's Not There". It was released in mid-1964 and peaked at No. 12 in the UK, becoming their only UK Top 40 hit. The tune began to catch on in the United States and eventually climbed to No. 2 in early December. It sold over one million copies and was awarded a gold certification by the Recording Industry Association of America (RIAA).

=== 1964–1967 ===
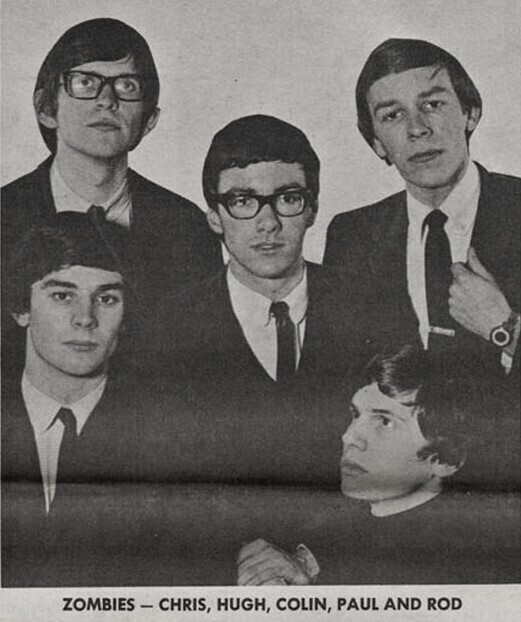
The Zombies in mid-1965

Like many other British groups, the Zombies travelled to the United States to tour on the momentum of their hit single. Among their early US gigs were Murray the K's Christmas shows at the Brooklyn Fox Theatre, where the band played seven performances a day. On 12 January 1965, the band made their first in-person appearance on US television on the first episode of NBC's Hullabaloo and played "She's Not There" and their new single "Tell Her No" to a screaming, hysterical audience full of teenage girls.

In the UK, the Zombies' follow-up single to "She's Not There" was written by Chris White. "Leave Me Be" was unsuccessful in the UK and, as a result, was not issued as an A-side in the US. It did appear as the B side of their second US single, "Tell Her No". Penned by Rod Argent, "Tell Her No" became another big seller in 1965, peaking at No. 6 on the Billboard Hot 100 in March. As the band's third UK single, "Tell Her No" failed to make the Top 40, peaking at No. 42. Subsequent singles - "She's Coming Home", "I Want You Back Again", "Whenever You're Ready", "Is This the Dream", "Just Out of Reach" (recorded for the soundtrack of the film Bunny Lake is Missing), "Indication" and "Gotta Get a Hold of Myself" - failed to achieve the success of the previous two singles (although the Zombies had continued success in Scandinavia and the Philippines, which led to a series of concerts in 1967). A song by the Zombies released only as a B-side (to "Whenever You're Ready") in both the US and UK in 1965, "I Love You", subsequently became a sizeable hit for the group People! in the United States in 1968.

The Zombies' first UK album, Begin Here (1965), was a mixture of original songs and rhythm and blues cover versions. Of the eight original tracks, Rod Argent supplied the album's biggest hit, "She's Not There", and the songs "Woman", "I Remember When I Loved Her", plus "The Way I Feel Inside" which was the shortest track on the album at 1:28. It might have been shorter, had not their recording manager and producer Ken Jones added the sounds of footsteps and a coin dropping, which contributed to the feeling of alienation that the song projected. Bassist Chris White provided "I Can't Make Up My Mind", the quirky "I Don't Want to Know", plus the beaty "What More Can I Do", which, at 1:38, is the second-shortest cut on the album and contains a simple but distinctive drum riff. The final original was an instrumental written by Ken Jones, "Work 'n' Play".

The Zombies in 1966. L-R: Chris White, Colin Blunstone, Hugh Grundy, Paul Atkinson and Rod Argent.

The Zombies continued recording original songs through 1965 and 1966, trying to achieve chart success. There were enough tracks to have filled a follow-up album, but due to the band's lack of chart success, most of these tracks remained unissued at the time.

=== Odessey and Oracle ===
In 1967, frustrated by their continuing lack of success, the Zombies left Decca and signed a recording contract with CBS Records for whom they recorded the album Odessey and Oracle at EMI's world-famous Abbey Road studios.

The band's budget did not stretch to session musicians, so they used a Mellotron to fill out their arrangements. According to Argent and Blunstone, they used John Lennon's Mellotron, which had been left in the studio after the Beatles' sessions for Sgt. Pepper's Lonely Hearts Club Band. White, in an interview with Des Burkinshaw and Rich Merrick on the Without the Beatles podcast/video, remembers the Mellotron being one that Abbey Road Studios hired for use for the Beatles as Lennon "kept his at home". The album was mixed into the standard mono; however, as another concession toward their limited budget, Argent and White (who, due to their songwriting royalties, had earned more than the rest of the members) personally paid for stereo mixes.

The change in direction was evident on their first single released by CBS, "Care of Cell 44", a song about the anticipation felt while waiting for the singer's partner to be released from prison. It is also notable that the title of the song does not appear anywhere in the lyrics. Unfortunately, like their previous Decca releases, it failed to reach the charts. A second CBS single, "Friends of Mine", was also unsuccessful.

=== Band break-up ===
With the band experiencing a declining demand for live appearances, they split up after a final gig in mid-December 1967.

In April 1968 Argent explained the reason for the band breaking up, saying "We don't want to end up playing for £20 a night in third-class ballrooms. We are still in big demand on the university circuit and are getting a lot of work. We want to quit while the going's good".

=== Release of last Zombies album ===
Odessey and Oracle, the band's swansong album, was released in the UK in April 1968, months after the band's breakup. The album suffered poor sales. It was only released in the US because musician Al Kooper, then signed to Columbia Records, convinced the label of the album's merits. One of its tracks, "Time of the Season", written by Argent, was released as a single in 1968 and spent a long period as a 'sleeper'. Eventually, in 1969, it grew to become a nationwide hit in the US, peaking in the Hot 100 (Billboard) at No. 3.

=== Unreleased final album ===
In 1968 Argent and White began working on material for a possible new band when they were approached by CBS to do another Zombies album. Several new Argent/White songs were cut, initially with a line-up of Argent, White, Hugh Grundy, Rick Birkett (guitar) and Mac MacLeod (bass on one track) with the latter four being replaced during the sessions by Jim Rodford (bass), Bob Henrit (drums) and Russ Ballard (guitar). The new tracks were combined with some old Decca out-takes and demos that were overdubbed and enhanced in sessions at Morgan Studios in London. The album, scheduled for release in 1969, was cancelled, and only a couple of the songs, "Imagine the Swan" (one of the newly recorded songs) and "If It Don't Work Out" (a demo of a song that Dusty Springfield recorded and released in 1965), were put out as singles instead. Some of this material was released on various compilation albums during the 1970s and 1980s, including 1973's Time of the Zombies, and the whole album, titled R.I.P., was released in Japan in 2000.

=== Post–Zombies (1969–1988) ===
The original line-up declined to regroup for concerts following the belated American success of "Time of the Season". In turn, various concocted bands tried to capitalise on the success and falsely toured under the band's name. In a scheme organised by Delta Promotions, an agency that also created fake touring versions of the Animals and the Archies, two fake Zombie line-ups were touring simultaneously in 1969, one hailing from Texas, the other from Michigan. The Texas group featured bassist Dusty Hill and drummer Frank Beard, soon to be members of ZZ Top.

In 1969 the last line-up of the Zombies – Argent, Ballard, Rodford and Henrit – began working under a new name, Argent, with White as a non-performing songwriter. Atkinson worked in A&R at Columbia and Grundy joined him there after a brief spell in auto sales. Blunstone started a solo career after a brief period outside the music business, including working in the burglary claims section of the Sun Alliance insurance company. Both Argent and White provided him with new songs. He also did studio vocals for the Alan Parsons Project. Atkinson retired as a performer and worked as an A&R executive for many years.

=== 1989–1999 ===
In 1989 Blunstone, White and Grundy briefly reunited as the Zombies with guitarist/keyboardist Sebastian Santa Maria and recorded the album The Return of the Zombies, released in some European countries in February 1990. The UK release was held back to April 1991, when a reconfigured version of the album was issued as New World.

A 1997 120-track compilation of the original band's work, Zombie Heaven, was released on UK Ace/Big beat. The compilation contains all the band's Decca/Parrot recordings (in mono), the entire Odessey And Oracle LP (in stereo), the material that would have made up the unissued R.I.P. LP, several unissued recordings and a disc of recordings made for the BBC. On 25 November 1997, all five Zombies reunited at the Jazz Café in London's Camden Town as part of a solo show by Blunstone to perform "She's Not There" and "Time of the Season" to promote the release of Zombie Heaven.

Blunstone and Argent did not play together again until late 1999. Argent spotted Blunstone in the audience while performing at a charity concert for jazz musician John Dankworth and invited him onstage for an impromptu reunion. This positive experience set the stage for further collaborations to come.

=== 2000–2016 ===
The twosome reunited to play shows together in 2000 under the Colin Blunstone & Rod Argent moniker and moved to the U.S. in 2001. They recorded an album, Out of the Shadows (2001), and continued playing live shows together into 2004 when they began going out under the name "The Zombies" again. The new line-up included Keith Airey (brother of Don Airey) on guitar, Jim Rodford on bass and his son Steve Rodford on drums.

In 2002 Ace/Big Beat released the 48-track The Decca Stereo Anthology, which, for the first time, mixed all the Decca/Parrot recordings into true stereo. An album of new material released in 2004, As Far as I Can See..., received poor-to-scathing reviews from both Pitchfork and AllMusic.

In January 2004 guitarist Paul Atkinson received the President's Merit Award from the National Academy of Recording Arts and Sciences at a benefit concert at the House of Blues in Los Angeles, California. The Zombies reunited for the event, which turned out to be Atkinson's last performance with them. He died later that year on 1 April 2004, in Santa Monica, California, from liver and kidney disease.

In 2005 Blunstone and Argent released a DVD and 2-CD album (Live at the Bloomsbury Theatre) and continued touring with the Zombies. To mark the 40th anniversary of Odessey and Oracle, the four surviving original members of the Zombies participated in a three-night series of concerts at London's Shepherd's Bush Empire Theatre between 7 and 9 March 2008. Blunstone and Argent's respective websites had advertised that the concert of 8 March was recorded for a CD and DVD release later in 2008, and the CD was officially posted by Amazon.com to be pre-sold for a release of 1 July 2008. Both CD and DVD were officially released in the UK and several other countries.

In 2006 Argent performed and toured with Ringo Starr as part of the All-Starr Band. Argent performed the Zombies' songs "She's Not There" and "Time of the Season" as well as "Hold Your Head Up" from his other musical group, Argent.

In 2010 Ace Records released a series of six 7-inch vinyl EPs. All the tracks were new to vinyl, with some rarities taken from the Zombie Heaven box set, as well as previously unreleased material. Tom Toomey replaced Airey on guitar. In 2011, "The Zombies featuring Colin Blunstone & Rod Argent" released their new studio album Breathe Out, Breathe In. Reviews were generally strong, and included 4-star reviews from publications including Record Collector, Q, Uncut, the Daily Mirror and The Independent. The band set out to tour annually in the UK, US, Canada and Netherlands. The 2011 tour included Japan, France, Germany, Greece and Israel.

In 2012 band members participated in the unveiling of a commemorative plaque at the Blacksmith's Arms, a St Albans pub where the Zombies met for their first rehearsal.

On 19 July 2013 it was announced that the band would be appearing on the second annual Moody Blues Cruise, 2–7 April 2014 on the cruise ship MSC Ship Divina.

In 2014 the Zombies performed in festival circuits, including the Austin Psych Festival and San Francisco Stern Grove Festival. The next year, the band announced they would embark on a 2015 American tour of the Odessey and Oracle album with White and Grundy returning.

The Zombies' sixth album, Still Got That Hunger, produced by Chris Potter, was announced for a release date of 9 October 2015. The album's recording was successfully funded by crowdfunding service PledgeMusic during August 2014. The Zombies toured the US in the autumn of 2015 to promote Still Got That Hunger and were again joined by surviving former members White and Grundy, along with keyboardist Darian Sahanaja and White's wife Viv Boucherat (on backing vocals) to play the entire Odessey & Oracle album. On 30 October 2015, the Zombies made a guest appearance on The Late Show with Stephen Colbert.

=== 50th anniversary of Odessey and Oracle ===
In 2017 the four surviving original members (Colin Blunstone, Rod Argent, Chris White and Hugh Grundy) re-united for a North American tour marking the 50th anniversary of the recording of Odessey and Oracle. The first stop on this tour was a first-time performance in Jamaica, as the featured artist on the Flower Power Cruise on the Celebrity Summit while in port in Falmouth. A popular podcast, S-Town, used "A Rose for Emily" as its closing music. This exposure helped the Zombies land a guest appearance on Conan in May 2017.

Commenting on the album's half-century of popularity, Argent said, “At the time we made it, we would have thought it was complete craziness that the songs would resonate 50 years later".

=== Rock and Roll Hall of Fame ===
On 16 October 2013 the Zombies were announced as nominees for inclusion to the Rock and Roll Hall of Fame, the first nomination for the band since coming into eligibility in 1990. The Zombies were nominated again for the Hall in 2016 and in October 2017. They were announced as one of seven inductees for the 2019 class in December 2018. The band were inducted into the Rock and Roll Hall of Fame in 2019.

=== 2019–2024 ===
In May 2019 the Zombies announced a co-headlining tour with Brian Wilson and Al Jardine of The Beach Boys called "Something Great From ’68’" featuring the Zombies performing Odessey and Oracle, in addition to other greatest hits. This tour would also feature the four surviving original members (Colin Blunstone, Rod Argent, Chris White and Hugh Grundy) in addition to the band's current line-up.

In late 2021, the band announced they would be undertaking extensive tours of Britain, the US, Canada and Europe between February and September 2022. However, in January 2022 it was announced that the UK part of the tour would be postponed until 2023.

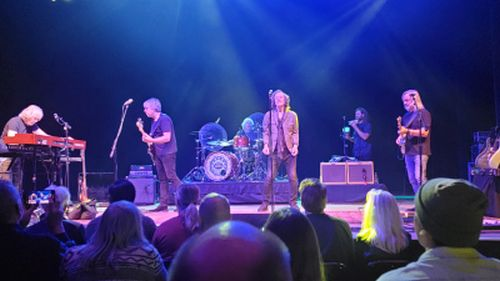
The Zombies performing at the Royal Oak Music Theatre in Royal Oak, Michigan, 18 October 2023.

In October 2023, the band performed at the Royal Oak Music Theatre in Royal Oak, Michigan.

On 11 July 2024 it was announced that 79 year old Rod Argent would be retiring from touring after suffering a stroke following the completion of a UK tour. A projected fall tour of the US was then canceled.

A festival, called Begin Here, celebrated Rod Argent's legacy and retirement. The festival, held in St Albans on 8-10 November 2024, included a special performance, "The Zombies & Friends: A Tribute to Rod Argent," on 9 November at the Eric Morecambe Centre in Harpenden. Other highlights included a performance of Colin Blunstone's album One Year. After this Blunstone continued to tour and perform as a solo act, with the Zombies remaining inactive.

== Hung Up on a Dream documentary ==
The Zombies: Hung Up on a Dream is a documentary film chronicling the band's six-decade career. The film was released May 2025 in theatres across the US, and garnered a 90% "Rotten Tomatoes" score. Directed by Robert Schwartzman, the film features archival footage, interviews with the surviving original members, and appearances by band’s admirers such as Paul Weller, Dave Grohl, Hayley Williams, Harry Styles, HAIM, Post Malone and FINNEAS.

== Musical style ==
The Zombies’ early material comprised keyboard-driven beat music and their take on American R&B before they began producing the richly-arranged baroque pop and psychedelia that would see them retrospectively described as progenitors of the upcoming progressive rock movement.

Richie Unterberger of AllMusic wrote: "Aside from the Beatles and perhaps the Beach Boys, no mid-'60s rock group wrote melodies as gorgeous as those of the Zombies. Dominated by Colin Blunstone's breathy vocals, choral backup harmonies, and Rod Argent's shining jazz- and classical-influenced organ and piano, the band sounded utterly unique for its era. Perhaps too unique to find mass mainstream success." He also credited the group with "redefin[ing] the concept of the rock album with 1968's Odessey and Oracle."

== Members ==
- Rod Argent – keyboards, lead and backing vocals (1962–1967, 1968, 1989, 1997, 2004–2024)
- Colin Blunstone – lead and backing vocals, tambourine, occasional guitar (1962–1967, 1989–1991, 1997, 2004–2024)
- Hugh Grundy – drums, percussion, occasional backing vocals (1962–1967, 1968, 1989–1991, 1997; tour guest at select shows 2008, 2015, 2017–2019)
- Chris White – bass guitar, backing and occasional lead vocals (1962–1967, 1968, 1989–1991, 1997; tour guest at select shows 2008, 2015, 2017–2019)
- Paul Atkinson – guitar, occasional backing vocals (1962–1967, 1989, 1997, 2004; died 2004)
- Paul Arnold – bass guitar (1962)
- Rick Birkett – guitar (1968)
- Jim Rodford – bass guitar, backing vocals (1968, 2004–2018; died 2018)
- Russ Ballard – guitar (1968)
- Bob Henrit – drums (1968)
- Sebastian Santa Maria – keyboards, guitar, backing vocals (1989–1991; died 1996)
- Keith Airey – guitar, backing vocals (2004–2010)
- Steve Rodford – drums, percussion (2004–2024)
- Darian Sahanaja – keyboards, backing vocals (2008, 2015, 2017–2019)
- Tom Toomey – guitar, backing vocals (2010–2024)
- Søren Koch – bass guitar, backing vocals (2018–2024)

== Discography ==
- Begin Here (UK)/The Zombies (US) (1965)
- Odessey and Oracle (1968)
- The Return of the Zombies (1990)/New World (1991)
- R.I.P. (2000, recorded in 1968)
- As Far as I Can See... (2004)
- Breathe Out, Breathe In (2011)
- Still Got That Hunger (2015)
- Different Game (2023)

== Other sources ==
- Guinness Rockopedia - ISBN 0-85112-072-5
- The Great Rock Discography - 5th Edition - ISBN 1-84195-017-3
- Johansen, Claes (2001). The Zombies: Hung Up On A Dream. London, England: SAF Publishing. ISBN 0946719349.
- Platts, Robin (2025). Times and Seasons – The Rise and Fall and Rise of The Zombies. Chicago: Hozac. ISBN 979-8-9881170-8-7.
