= Date Records =

Defunct American record label

Date Records was a sub-label of Columbia Records which had two different incarnations.

The first incarnation was a short-lived rockabilly label from 1957 to 1958 which notably included a release by Billy "Crash" Craddock.

The more significant incarnation was relaunched in February 1966 by industry executive Tom Noonan. The label was relaunched to promote Columbia's acquired and independently produced recordings as opposed to Columbia's in-house productions.

The most successful acts on the Date label were Peaches & Herb and the Zombies. Domestically, the label was dissolved in 1970, except for one more single ("I'll Close the Door Behind Me" by the Pooh, an English-language version of "Tanta Voglia Di Lei") that was released in early 1972. The Date name would continue to be used for reissues in South Africa and Rhodesia until 1976. Date acts were transferred to either the Columbia or Epic labels with most reissues of Date material on Epic. Sony Music Entertainment now owns the Date catalogue which is managed by Legacy Recordings.
