= Chris White (musician, born 1943) =

British bassist (born 1943)

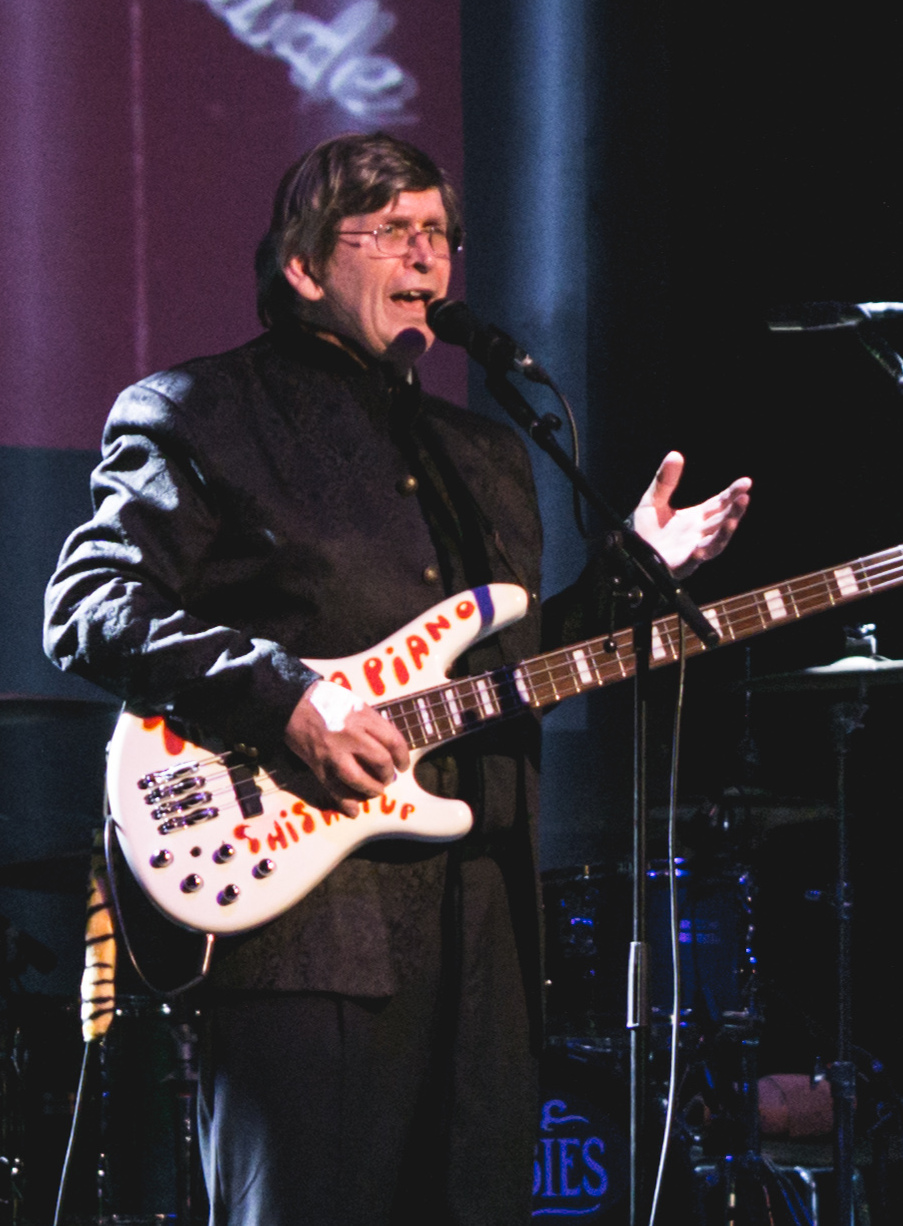
- White performing with the Zombies in 2019

Background information
- Born: Christopher Taylor White; 7 March 1943 (age 83)
- Origin: Barnet, Hertfordshire, England
- Genres: Rock; pop; psychedelic rock; progressive rock
- Occupations: Musician; songwriter; record producer
- Instruments: Bass guitar; vocals
- Years active: 1959–present
- Member of: The Chris White Experience
- Formerly of: The Zombies; Argent; White Circle

Christopher Taylor White (born 7 March 1943) is an English musician. He came to prominence in the mid-1960s as the bass guitarist and occasional lead vocalist of the rock band the Zombies. White is one of the main composers of the Zombies' music, and made major lyrical contributions to the band's songs. He was inducted into the Rock and Roll Hall of Fame in 2019 as a member of the Zombies.

== Early years ==
White was born on 7 March 1943, in Barnet, Hertfordshire, to Harold White, a bus inspector for London Transport, and his wife Nan. The family soon relocated to Markyate, Hertfordshire, where they owned the village general store, selling groceries, hardware, paint, and furniture. As a pastime, Harold White played double bass in dance bands performing the music of Glenn Miller and other swing bands; he gave his son his earliest musical training, playing guitar alongside White on the ukulele. There was also a piano in the house. White attended St Albans County Grammar School, Hertfordshire, where he met Colin Blunstone, later meeting Rod Argent, Paul Atkinson, and Hugh Grundy who were at St. Albans School, the musicians who became the Zombies. Atkinson nicknamed White "the daddy of the group" since was at least two years older than the rest of the Zombies and the only member to have memories of the Second World War.

== The Zombies ==
White replaced the Zombies' initial bass guitarist, Paul Arnold, and became one of the band's two main songwriters, alongside Rod Argent. He wrote two tracks on their US debut album, The Zombies, released in January 1965. On the UK debut release, Begin Here, he had three tracks. For the Zombies' performances in the 1965 film Bunny Lake Is Missing White wrote "Nothing's Changed" and "Remember You".

One of the main songwriters of the band, he also wrote seven of the twelve songs on the band's second and final album, the well-received Odessey and Oracle. White also contributed lead vocals to "Butcher's Tale (Western Front 1914)" and a verse of "Brief Candles". Some releases of "She's Not There" attribute Chris as the composer instead of Rod Argent.

His song "I Love You", originally recorded by the Zombies in 1965, was a hit for the band People! in 1968.

In March 2008, White began a series of live performances with the other three surviving members of the Zombies, including the first complete performances of the album Odessey and Oracle, in celebration of the 40th anniversary of its release.

While White is not a member of The Zombies’ current lineup, he has rejoined the group on several tours featuring the surviving original lineup between 2008 and 2019 to play Odessey and Oracle in its entirety.

== Argent ==
Following the demise of the Zombies, White contributed songwriting and production work to Colin Blunstone's solo career and Rod Argent's new band, Argent. With Argent he co-wrote their 1972 hit "Hold Your Head Up".

== The Chris White Experience ==
Since 2019, Chris has been releasing previously unheard material under the series name The Chris White Experience featuring performances from a host of well-known artists. As of July 2021, he has released five volumes of songs, and a previously unreleased album by the band Sparrow.

== Other work ==
In 2007, as part of the band White Circle, he co-wrote, co-produced and performed on the album The Key with his son Matthew White and wife Vivienne Boucherat.

Also in 2007/2008, White co-produced and played on the album Featherhead for his youngest son, the London-based singer-songwriter JJ White.

Chris and his wife Vivienne Boucherat provide backing vocals on the 2016 album My Religion by John Verity.

== Personal life ==
White currently resides in London. He is married to Viv Boucherat. White is father to three sons: Matthew, Jamie ("JJ") and Sacha.

== Discography ==
=== The Zombies ===
==== Studio albums ====
- Begin Here (UK) / The Zombies (US) (1965)
- Odessey and Oracle (1968)
- The Return of the Zombies (1990)/New World (1991)

==== EPs ====
- The Zombies (1964)

==== Singles ====
Title	Year	Peak chart positions						Certifications	Album (A-side only)
Title	Year	UK	AUS	CAN	NL	US Billboard	US Cashbox	Certifications	Album (A-side only)
"She's Not There" b/w "You Make Me Feel Good"	1964	12	11	2	—	2	1		Begin Here / The Zombies
"Leave Me Be" b/w "Woman"	1964	—	81	—	—	—	—		Non album single
"Tell Her No" UK & AUS b/w "What More Can I Do?" US & CAN b/w "Leave Me Be"	1964	42	60	6	—	6	6		The Zombies
"She's Coming Home" b/w "I Must Move"	1965	—	—	21	—	58	48		Non album singles
"I Want You Back Again" b/w "I Remember When I Loved Her"	1965	—	—	—	—	95	92 / 122		Non album singles
"Whenever You're Ready" b/w "I Love You"	1965	—	—	—	—	110	114		Non album singles
"Just Out of Reach" b/w "Remember You"	1965	—	—	—	—	113	110		Non album singles
"Is This the Dream?" b/w "Don't Go Away"	1966	—	—	—	—	—	—		Non album singles
"Indication" b/w "How We Were Before"	1966	—	—	—	—	—	—		Non album singles
"Gotta Get a Hold of Myself" b/w "The Way I Feel Inside"	1966	—	—	—	—	—	—		Non album singles
"Goin' Out of My Head" b/w "She Does Everything for Me"	1967	—	—	—	—	—	—		Non album singles
"Friends of Mine" b/w "Beechwood Park"	1967	—	—	—	—	—	—		Odessey and Oracle
"Care of Cell 44" b/w "Maybe After He's Gone"	1967	—	—	—	—	—	—		Odessey and Oracle
"Time of the Season" b/w "I'll Call You Mine" b/w "Friends of Mine" (1969 US re-release)	1968	—	43	1	14	3	1	BPI: Silver; RIAA: Gold	Odessey and Oracle
"I Love You" b/w "The Way I Feel Inside"	1968	—	—	—	—	—	—		Non album single
"Butcher's Tale (Western Front 1914)" b/w "This Will Be Our Year"	1968	—	—	—	—	—	—		Odessey and Oracle
"Imagine the Swan" b/w "Conversation Off Floral Street"	1969	—	—	59	—	109	77		Non album singles
"If It Don't Work Out" b/w "Don't Cry For Me"	1969	—	—	—	—	—	—		Non album singles
