= List of garage rock compilation albums =

This is a list of compilation albums featuring recordings entirely or mostly in the garage rock style of music, including variations of the genre ranging from basic garage rock and frat rock to folk rock-influenced and psychedelic garage rock. Most of the recordings compiled on these albums was originally recorded in the period between 1963-1968 in the United States and Canada. The list also includes compilations of recordings made outside of North America, in places such as Great Britain, Continental Europe, Latin America, and the far East, which are sometimes mentioned as variants of the garage rock style (and are sometimes referred to as "Freakbeat," "Nederbeat", or "Group Sounds," as well as "beat", etc.).

When known, the city, state, country or region of origin of is given in parentheses. "US" covers the United States of America, while "UK" covers all parts of the United Kingdom (England, Northern Ireland, Wales, etc.). "Mixed" means that the music comes from many parts of the world even if individual volumes within a series concentrate on a particular country or region. The list also contains sections devoted to later garage rock subgenres. The Nuggets and Pebbles albums were the pioneering series, so they are listed first, followed by the remainder in alphabetical order.

== Pioneering compilation series ==
=== Nuggets ===
- Nuggets: Original Artyfacts from the First Psychedelic Era, 1965–1968 — original compilation album (Elektra Records; reissue — Sire Records) (US)
- Nuggets (series) — a series of follow-up albums issued by Rhino Records (US)
- Nuggets: Original Artyfacts from the First Psychedelic Era, 1965–1968 — 1998 expanded box set (Rhino Records) (US)
- Nuggets II: Original Artyfacts from the British Empire and Beyond, 1964–1969 — box set (Rhino Records) (Europe)

=== Pebbles ===
- Pebbles (series) (Various)
- Pebbles (series) (unofficial)
- Pebbles Box
- Trash Box

== List of compilations and series ==
- 30 Seconds before the Calico Wall
- 94 Baker Street (series) (UK)

=== A ===
- A Fistful of Fuzz (US)
- A-Square (Of Course): The Story of Michigan's Legendary A-Square Records (UK)
- Acid Dreams (US)
- Acid Dreams Epitaph (US)
- Acid and Flowers (US)
- Acid Visions (series) (US) – includes a box set
- Acid Visions / Best of Texas Punk and Psychedelic (Texas)
- Acid Visions / Hors Serie — Tripping With The Texas Girls (Texas)
- Allentown Anglophile (Pennsylvania)
- Aliens, Psychos and Wild Things series (Virginia)
- Arf Arf Blitzkrieg Sampler (Mixed)
- Arf! Arf! - El Cheapo 2-CD Sampler (Mixed)
- Attack of the Jersey Teens (New Jersey)

=== B ===
- Back from the Grave (US)
- Back to Peru (Peru)
- Bad Vibrations (series) (US)
- Baltimore's Teen Beat (Baltimore, MD)
- Basementsville, U.S.A.
- Battle of the Bands — Outcasts and Arkay IV
- Beat Beat Beat (series) (UK)
- Le Beat Bespokƒ (series) (Europe)
- Beat, Bluf & Branie (series) (The Netherlands)
- Beat Express (series) (The Netherlands)
- Beat from Holland (series) (The Netherlands)
- Beat Met Een Zachte G (The Netherlands)
- Beat the Road Jack (mostly Denmark)
- The Beat Scene (UK)
- Beatschuppen (Mixed)
- Belgian Beat Blast (series) (Belgium)
- Best Beat (The Netherlands) – "two-fer" CD with Nederbiet also
- The Best of Louie Louie (series) (US)
- Beyond the Calico Wall
- Biet Het (series) (The Netherlands and Belgium)
- Blizzard Beat (Swedish comp., cassette)
- Blunderbuss
- Born Bad (series) (US)
- Boulders (series) (US)
- Bring Flowers to U.S. (US)
- Bring Flowers to the World (Europe)
- Brum Beat (UK)
- Bury My Body (UK)
- Buzz Buzz Buzz (series) (UK)
- Byrds Won't Fly Today

=== C ===
- Cambodian Rock (series) (Cambodia)
- Chains and Black Exhaust (US)
- Chocolate Soup for Diabetics (series) (UK)
- Cicadelic 60's (series) (US)
- Come Fly with Us! (US)
- Contact / Sounds of Mod (UK)
- Conquer the World (series) (Mixed)
- The Continent Lashes Back (series) (Europe)
- Copenhagen Beat (series) (Denmark)

=== D ===
- Dans Le Vent (series) (Canada)
- Deadly Dose of Wylde Psych (US)
- Destination Frantic (US)
- Die Today (US)
- Digging for Gold (series) (US)
- Doin' the Mod (series) (UK)
- Downbeat (The Netherlands)
- Dream Babes (series) (UK)
- Dutch Beat Explosion (The Netherlands)
- Dutch Pop Giants (The Netherlands)

=== E ===
- Ear-Piercing Punk (US)
- Eastern PA Rock (series) (Pennsylvania)
- Electric Sugar Cube Flashbacks (series) (UK)
- English Freakbeat (series) (UK)
- Everything You Always Wanted to Know about '60's Mind Expansive Punkadelic Garage Rock Instrumentals but Were Afraid to Ask

=== F ===
- Fenton Story (Michigan)
- For a Few Fuzz Guitars More (US)
- Fort Worth Teen Scene! (Fort Worth, TX)
- Frat Shack (series) (US)
- Freakbeat Scene (UK)
- French Cuts (series) (French)
- Friday at the Hideout / Boss Detroit Garage 1964-67 (Detroit, MI)
- From The Mid-60's The Bad Vibrations Of 16 U.S.A. Lost Band
- Fuzz, Flaykes and Shakes (series) (US)

=== G ===
- Gaiety Records Story (series) (Canada)
- Garageaholic! Psychedelic! Outsider Music! (Mixed|Arf Arf sampler)
- Garage Beat '66 (US)
- Garage Punk Unknowns (mostly USA bands)
- Garage Swim (US)
- Garage Zone (mostly US bands)
- Get Lost (series) (New Zealand)
- Girls Go Zonk (US)
- Girls in the Garage (series) (Mostly US)
- Girls with Guitars (Mixed)
- Grains of Time (US)
- Green Crystal Ties (US)
- Gravel (series) (US)
- Great Lost Elektra Singles (series) (UK)
- Great Pebbles (series)
- Growing Slowly Insane
- GS I Love You (Japan)
- GS I Love You Too (Japan)

=== H ===
- Hang it Out to Dry!
- Hava Narghile (series) (Turkey, etc.)
- Heart So Cold (Northeastern United States)
- Hearts of Stone (series) (Brazil)
- Heavy Dose of Lyte Psych (Mixed)
- Highs in the Mid-Sixties (series)
- A History of Garage and Frat Bands in Memphis 1960-1975, Volume 1
- History of Northwest Rock (Washington/Oregon)
- The History of Texas Garage Bands in the '60s (series) (Texas)
- Hotel Cleveland (series) (Cleveland, OH)
- How Was the Air Up There (New Zealand)
- The Houston Post Nowsounds Groove-In (US)

=== I ===
- I Wanna Come Back from the World of LSD (Southwestern United States)
- In the Garden (UK)
- In-Kraut (series) (Germany)
- Incredible Sound Show Stories (series) (UK)
- Instro Hipsters a Go Go (series)
- Intoxica! (Southern California)
- It Came from the Garage! Nuggets from Southern California (UK)
- It's a Go Go World
- It's a Kave In (Australia)
- It's Happening Here (New Jersey)

=== J ===
- Just for Kicks (US)

=== K ===
- Khmer Folk & Pop (series) (Cambodia)
- Kicks & Chicks (US)

=== L ===
- Last of the Garage Punk Unknowns (US/Germany)
- Legendary Joe Meek (UK)
- Let's Dig 'em Up (series) (US)
- Lethal Dose of Hard Psych
- Living in the Past (series) (The Netherlands)
- El Loco Rocanrol (series) (Mixed)
- Lost Generation (series) (US)
- Lost Illusions (series) (Germany)
- Love is a Sad Song (US)
- Love Peace & Poetry (series) (Mixed)

=== M ===
- Michigan Mayhem (Michigan)
- Midnight to Sixty-Six (US)
- The Midnite Sound of the Milky Way
- Mindrocker (US)
- Mod Meeting (series) (UK)
- Mod Scene (UK)
- Motor City Is Burning (series) (Detroit, MI)

=== N ===
- Nederbeat 63-69 Box Set (series) (The Netherlands)
- Nederbeat (series) (The Netherlands)
- Nederbiet (The Netherlands) – "two-fer" CD with Best Beat also
- Nederpop (series) (The Netherlands)
- Neurotic Reactions (Mixed)
- New England in the 60's - You Ain't Gonna Bring Me Down to My Knees (New England)
- New England Teen Scene (New England)
- New Jersey Garage Unknowns (US)
- New Mexico in the '60's – From the Grass to the Outer Limits (New Mexico)
- New Rubble (series) (mostly UK)
- Nice - Anthology of Peter Eden Productions (UK)
- Night is so Dark (US)
- Nightmares from the Underworld (Canada)
- No No No (US)
- Now Hear This! Garage & Beat from the Norman Petty Vaults (UK)
- The Northwest Battle of the Bands (series) (Washington/Oregon)
- Nuggets from the Golden State (California)

=== O ===
- O Toi Beatnik (France)
- Oh, it's More from Raw (US)
- Oh Yeah! The Best of Dunwich Records
- One Hand in the Darkness (US)
- Overdose of Heavy Psych

=== P ===
- Papermen Fly in the Sky (UK)
- Party Party Party
- Pennsylvania Unknowns (Pennsylvania)
- Pebbles (series) (US)
- Pepperisms Round the Globe (Mixed)
- Perfumed Garden (series) (UK)
- Planetary Pebbles
- Prae Kraut Pandaemonium (series) (Europe)
- Pretty Ugly (series) (Australia)
- Prisoners of the Beat
- Psychedelia (series) (US)
- Psychedelic Crown Jewels (series)
- Psychedelic Experience (series) (US)
- Psychedelic Minds (series) (Mixed)
- Psychedelic Patchwork (series) (US)
- Psychedelic Pstones (series) (UK)
- Psychedelic States (series) (US)
- Psychedelic Super Pjotr (Eastern Europe)
- Psychedelic Underground (series) (Germany)
- Psychedelic Unknowns (series) (US)

=== Q ===
- Quagmire (series) (US)

=== R ===
- Rare 60's Beat Treasures (series) (UK)
- Rave with the Amphetamine Generation
- Raw Cuts (series: Swedish, German, Aussie and French bands on each)
- Real Cool Time (Swedish bands)
- The Return Of The Young Pennsylvanians (US)
- R-R-Real Rock & Roll (series)
- Riot of the Amphetamine Generation
- Ripples (series) (UK)
- Rock Hits of the Sixties
- Rock-N-Roll Music Is My Only Salvation (New Zealand)
- Rockabilly Psychosis and Garage Disease (US)
- Rubble (series) (UK)
- Rough in the Diamonds (series) (US)

=== S ===
- Scream Loud!!! The Fenton Story
- Scum of the Earth (series)
- Shadows Falling (series)
- Shakin' in Athens (Greece)
- Searching in the WILDerness (Mostly The Netherlands)
- Shapes and Sounds (UK)
- Shindig! (UK)
- Sigh Cry Die - 29 Tales of Woe & Despair
- Signed DC (DC metro area)
- Simla Beat 70
- Simla Beat 71
- Simla Beat 70/71
- Sixties Rebellion (series) (US)
- Soft Sounds for Gentle People (Mostly California)
- Some Kinda Fun – Songs We Taught the Untamed Youth
- Songs We Taught The Fuzztones
- Sons of YMA (Peru)
- Steam Kodak (Singapore and Southeast Asia)
- Sugarlumps (series)

=== T ===
- Teenage Shutdown! (series)
- Texas Flashbacks (series) (Texas)
- Texas Punk from the Sixties (series) (Texas)
- Thai Beat A Go Go (series) (Thailand)
- That Driving Beat (series) (UK)
- Three O'Clock Merriam Webster Time – Nomads and Lemon Fogg (Texas)
- Time Won't Change My Mind (US)
- Tobacco-A-Go-Go (series) (North Carolina)
- Tony the Tyger Presents Fuzz, Flaykes, & Shakes (series)
- Too Much Monkey Business (series) (Mixed)
- Top Teen Bands (series) (Minneapolis, MN)
- Trans World Punk Rave-Up! (Europe)
- Trash on Demand (series) (Mixed)
- Trenchmen Meet the Lost Souls (North Dakota)
- Trip in Tyme (series) (US)
- Tucson's '60's Sound (Tucson, Arizona)
- Turds on a Bum Ride (series) (Mixed)
- Tymes Gone By (US)

=== U ===
- Uptight Tonight: The Ultimate 1960s Garage Punk Primer (US)

=== W ===
- Wake the Neighbours (US)
- Washington, D.C. Garage Band Greats (Washington, D.C.)
- Waterpipes & Dikes (series) (The Netherlands)
- We All Live on Candy Green - Electric Sound Show (series) (UK)
- We Are the Mods (UK)
- We Had the Beat / The Heartbeats & Other Texas Girls of the 60s (Texas)
- Welter Confession (Greece)
- What a Way to Die (US)
- What's the Use
- Who Will Buy these Wonderful Evils (series) (Sweden)
- Wildworld (series) (Mixed)
- Winning Sides (series) (US)
- Winnipeg '60's (Winnipeg, MB, Canada)
- World of Acid (mostly United States, some Europe)
- Worldbeaters (series) (Mixed)
- Wrenchin' the Wires (series) (Poland)
- Writing Letters to Nowhere (Australia)
- Wyld Sydes (series) (US)

=== Y ===
- Ya Gotta Have Moxie / The Best of Boulders (series) (US)
- Yeah Yeah Yeah (US)
- Yellow Purple and Green (US)
- You're Playing with Fire (US)

== See also ==
- AIP Records
- Crypt Records
- Garage rock
- Fenton Records discography
- List of garage rock bands
- Norton Records
- Rhino Records
- Sundazed Music
