= Big Beat Records =

Big Beat Records is the name of the following record labels:

- Big Beat Records (British record label), UK, a garage rock/'60s-style rock label since 1979
- Big Beat Records (American record label), US, a hip-hop/house label in the 1990s
