= Brian Carman =

American guitarist (1945–2015)

- Born: August 10, 1945; Santa Ana, California, US
- Died: March 1, 2015 (aged 69) Santa Ana, California, US
- Genre: surf rock
- Instrument: Guitar
- Formerly of: The Chantays

Brian Craig Carman (August 10, 1945 – March 1, 2015) was an American guitarist and member of the instrumental group The Chantays, an instrumental group he formed with his Santa Ana High School classmates in 1961. Carman co-wrote their song "Pipeline", which went to number four in the US in 1963. He was born to a father who worked at a motors shop and a mother who was a secretary. His older brother, Steve, played in a local band, which inspired him.

== Death ==
He died at his home in Santa Ana on March 1, 2015 aged 69 from many health problems including Crohn's disease and Ulcerated colon. He was survived by his second wife wife Sunida and a son, Brett. Carman's first wife, Katie, preceded him in death from breast cancer. Carman was remembered by other surf rock artists such as Dick Dale, who called him a "good soul" and Dean Torrence of Jan and Dean.
