= The Midnite Sound of the Milky Way =

Compilation album
- Released: July 6, 2004
- Recorded: 1960s
- Genre: Garage rock; psychedelic
- Length: 54:01
- Label: Big Beat

The Midnite Sound of the Milky Way is a garage rock compilation available on compact disc put out by Big Beat Records (UK) that consists of songs recorded at the Midnite Sound recording studio in Danville, Illinois during the 1960s. The Midnite Sound studio one of many such venues pushing out obscure garage rock in the mid-1960s. The set was compiled by Alec Palao, who also wrote the liner notes. The compilation features twenty four tracks by different various artists who recorded there, and all except four have not been previously compiled. The Midnite Sound recording were often typified by an echo-laden sound, giving them a characteristically "outer space" vibe. The performers tended to be, even by 1960s garage rock norms, untutored and naively strange and noncommercial racket. The groups and artists who recorded at Midnite Sound tended to be less British Invasion-influenced than most, sometimes displaying rockabilly and pre-Beatles stylistics. The best-known act to record for the label was rockabilly/garage rocker Dean Carter, who is known for the song "Rebel Woman", which has appeared on several other compilations such as his Call of the Wild anthology on Big Beat Records. He does not appear on this set, but two performers here, George Jacks and The 12th Knight, do renditions of the song.

The set begins' with the flute-embellished "Workin' Man" by Kookie Cook, whose characteristically "deranged" vocals are heard again in his other cuts "Don't Lie", "Revenge", "Misery", "I Feel Alright", a version of "Ooby Dooby", previously done by Roy Orbison. Cook, a drummer, does the piece, "Drums", which features a drum solo and concludes the set. He also appears with the Satellites in surf the instrumentals "Space Race" and "Space Monster". None of the Cobras were over thirteen years old when they recorded "Try" and "Goodbye", which are the most British Invasion-influenced tracks on the set. The Grapes of Wrath do a version of the Shadows of Knight's "I'm Gonna Make You Mine". "The Fiery Stomp" is by the Travelers, whose lead singer Wilbur Miller was Amish. George Jacks' "Love Is Fine", "Fortunate Child," and "There's Got to Be a Reason" display Beau Brummels and folk rock influences.

== Track listing ==
1. Kookie Cook: "Workin' Man" (Richard Cook) 1:56
2. The Four A While: "Low Class Man" (Arlie Miller) 2:07
3. George Jacks: "Rebel Woman" (Arlie Miller) 2:04
4. The Cobras: "Try" 2:09
5. Travelers: "The Fiery Stomp" 1:59
6. Kookie Cook: "Don't Lie" (Richard Cook/Arlie Miller) 2:06
7. George Jacks: "Love Is Fine" (George Jacks) 2:44
8. Kookie Cook & the Satalites: "Space Race" (Arlie Miller) 1:56
9. Dave Marten: "You Gotta Love Me" 1:54
10. Kookie Cook: "Revenge" (Richard Cook/Arlie Miller) 2:09
11. The Grapes of Wrath: "I'm Gonna Make You Mine" (Bill Carr/Carl Derrico) 2:34
12. George Jacks: "Look" (George Jacks) 2:02
13. The Cobras: "Goodbye" 2:10
14. Kookie Cook: "Misery" (Richard Cook) 1:56 Spotify
15. George Jacks: "There's Got to Be a Reason" (George Jacks) 2:35
16. The Four A While: "Baby's Good" (Arlie Miller) 2:11
17. Kookie Cook: "I Feel Alright" (Richard Cook) 2:23
18. Jack Johnson: "Soul Soul Soul" (Jack Johnson) 2:56
19. George Jacks: "Fortinate Child" (George Jacks) 2:07
20. The 12th Knight: "Rebel Woman" (Arlie Miller) 2:18
21. Kookie Cook & the Satalites: "Space Monster" (Arlie Miller) 2:17
22. Kookie Cook: "Ooby Dooby" (Wade Moore/Dick Penner) 2:41
23. The 12th Knight: "Death Row" 2:41
24. Kookie Cook: "Drums" (Richard Cook) 2:06
