= Planetary Pebbles, Volume 3: Surfbeat Behind the Iron Curtain =

Compilation album
- Released: 14 January 1999
- Recorded: 1963–1966
- Genre: Surf rock; garage rock
- Length: 1:00:09
- Label: AIP

chronology
Planetary Pebbles, Volume 2: Exitos A Go Go (1998)	Planetary Pebbles, Volume 3: Surfbeat Behind the Iron Curtain (1999)

Planetary Pebbles, Volume 3: Surfbeat Behind the Iron Curtain (subtitled Part 2) is a compilation album featuring underground surf and garage rock musical artists east of the Iron Curtain that recorded between 1963 and 1967. It is the third and final installment of the Planetary Pebbles series, a sub-series to the Pebbles series, and was released on 14 January 1999 (see 1999 in music).

The music featured consisted primarily of surf rock instrumentals unexpectedly inspired by the recordings of the Shadows. Taking into account that conditions and recording techniques were primitive in comparison to their Western counterparts, the material evokes an additional layer of eeriness. However, there were exceptions to this with the Czech band, the Olympics, singing slurred English on "Story of the Girl with the Bass Guitar", the East German Team Four's authentic folk rock number, and Mondial, whose track was strikingly similar to Paul Revere and the Raiders. Less surprisingly, the vocals were influenced by music groups of the British Invasion. Among the most unusual songs was a cover version of Booker T. and the MGs' "Hip Hug-Her" by the T. Schumann Combo.

Planetary Pebbles, Volume 3 is the follow-up to the first album of the series, Surfbeat Behind the Iron Curtain, Volume 1, which also contained Eastern European group recordings. Like its predecessor, volume 3 assembled among the most rarest material available in any Pebbles series. However, volume 3 was more favorable for strictly containing European bands east of the Iron Curtain.

== Track listing ==
1. Singing Guitars – "Torpedo"
2. Singing Guitars – "Perfida"
3. The Hungarian Ensemble – "Konzert a Marson"
4. Satelliten – "Scary Night"
5. K. Duba and the Guitarmen – "Winnetou"
6. The Sputnicks – "So Much Love"
7. The Mefistos – "I am Coming Home Baby"
8. The Taifuns – "The West Wind"
9. The Olympics – "Story of the Girl with the Bass Guitar"
10. The Sputniks – "Spanish Gypsy Dance"
11. Karel Duba and His Big Beat Band – "Steps in the Sand"
12. T. Schumann Combo – "Puszta Beat" (45 version)
13. Cornel Fugaru and Sincron – "The Jodler From Gorj"
14. Studio 6 – "Party Time"
15. Illes – "Oh Mondd"
16. The Hungarian Ensemble – "Rollin' Rollin'"
17. Team 4 – "Ich Hab Ihr Ins Gesicht" Gesehn
18. Sincron – "Play with the Maiden"
19. The Olympics – "Mary Mary"
20. T. Schumann Combo – "Hackepeter"
21. The Amigos – "Komm Gib Mir Deine Hand"
22. George and Beathovens – "Lez Blazniveho Basnika"
23. Mondial – "Omule"
24. Mondial – "Orbul"
