= Downey Records =

American record label

- Founded: 1961
- Founder: Bill Wenzel
- Distributor: Dot Records
- Location: 13117 Lakewood Blvd, Downey, California, U.S.

Downey Records was an American record label owned by Bill Wenzel (July 26, 1912 – November 20, 1999) in Downey, California, and distributed at times by Dot Records.

Wenzel worked as a sound engineer for MGM studios and in 1958, opened Wenzel's Music Town in Downey, California. In 1959, he began the Jack Bee label which he eventually turned into the Downey label with a studio in the back of the record store. Wenzel operated the store with his wife, his son and daughter-in-law. When they were not creating masters in the studio, the studio was rented out. Wenzel produced Downey Records at his studio and made dubs of out-of-stock songs upon request. When Wenzel retired from the business in the 1960s, his son Tom Wenzel (1935–2008) and Tom's wife Maxine continued running the shop.

The biggest hit on the label was the instrumental "Pipeline" by the Chantay's, which peaked at No. 4 on the Billboard Hot 100 and No. 11 on the R&B chart in 1963. Singer-songwriter Barry White produced "Feel Aw Right" by the Bel Canto's on Downey Records in 1965, and released his first recordings under the name Lee Barry on the label in 1966. During the early 1960s, Downey was also producing records by The Rumblers, whose biggest hit "Boss" was leased to Dot Records, as well as "Pipeline", which had been leased around the same time.

In 2007, Big Beat Records released the compilation album It Came from the Garage! Nuggets from Southern California, compiled from Downey recordings.

== Selected discography ==
Catalog No.	Release date	Single (A-side, B-side)	US	US R&B	UK	Artist	Notes
101	Dec 1961	A: "Wimo Stomp"				The Pastel Six	Billboard review (December 19, 1961)
101	Dec 1961	B: "Twitchin'"				The Pastel Six	Billboard review (December 19, 1961)
104	Jan 1963	A: "Pipeline"	4	11	16	Chantay's	Cash Box review (January 19, 1963)
104	Jan 1963	B: "Move It"	4	11	16	Chantay's	Cash Box review (January 19, 1963)
115	Mar 1964	A: "Chip Chop (My Fair Lady)"				Jessie Hill	Cash Box review (March 7, 1964)
115	Mar 1964	B: "Woodshed"				Jessie Hill	Cash Box review (March 7, 1964)
134	1966	A: "Man Ain't Nothin'"				Lee Barry	Lee Barry was an alias for Barry White
134	1966	B: "I Don't Need It"				Lee Barry	Lee Barry was an alias for Barry White
136	Jul 1966	A: "Hang It Out To Dry"				Bud & Kathy	
136	Jul 1966	B: "Letter To An Angel"				Bud & Kathy	
139	1966	A: "I Can't Hear You"				Pat Powdrill	
139	1966	B: "Do It"				Pat Powdrill	
142	1967	A: "Cry Baby"				E.S.P. Limited	
142	1967	B: "In My Heart"				E.S.P. Limited	
