= Alberti bass =

Type of accompaniment figure in music

Mozart's Piano Sonata, K 545 (1788) opening.

1. Allegro
Performed by Robin Alciatore.

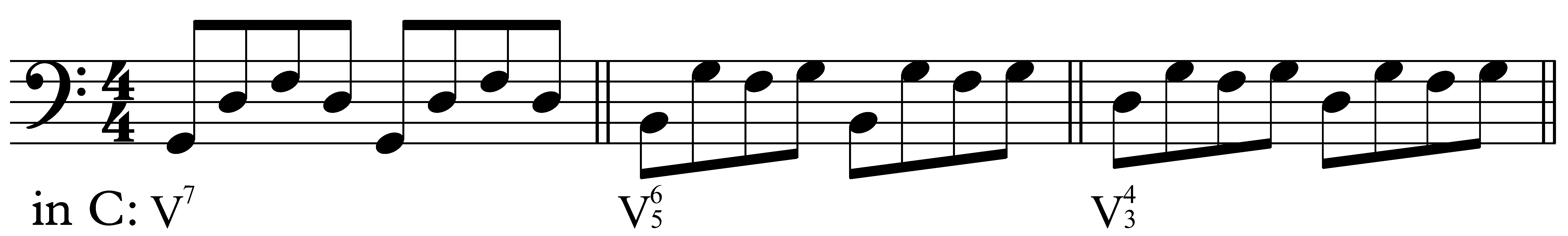
Bass patterns, including Alberti bass patterns

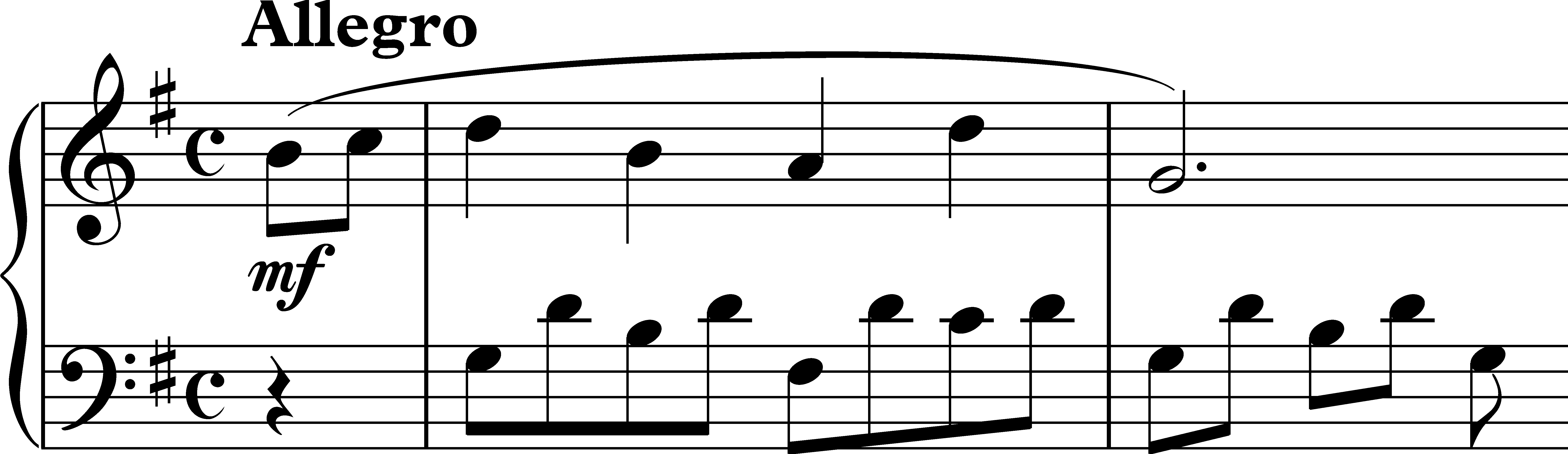
Alberti bass in the opening of Thomas Attwood's (1765–1838) Sonatina in G Major

Alberti bass is a particular kind of accompaniment figure in music, often used in the Classical era, and sometimes the Romantic era. It was named after Domenico Alberti (1710–1740/46), who used it extensively, although he was not the first to use it.

Alberti bass is a kind of broken chord or arpeggiated accompaniment, where the notes of the chord are presented in the order lowest, highest, middle, highest. This pattern is then repeated several times throughout the music. The broken chord pattern helps to create a smooth, sustained, flowing sound on the piano. "Chords of harmony broken up into short patterns. Steady bass patterns in orchestral music which give the rhythmic drive to Classical music, compensating for the energetic drive of the Baroque basso continuo line."

Alberti bass is usually found in the left hand of pieces for keyboard instruments, especially for Mozart's piano pieces. However, it is also found in pieces for other instruments. It has been described as "a true tolerable monotony," and as "perhaps the most overworked fixture of eighteenth-century music."

Well-known examples of Alberti bass include the beginning of Mozart's Piano Sonata, K 545, and the third movement of Beethoven's Moonlight Sonata. (Note: Given as an example in sources including) A famous example from 20th-century American popular music is the bass guitar part of the 1962 surf rock standard "Pipeline", by The Chantays. Alberti bass is also used in the ending theme of Nintendo's Super Mario Bros. 2.
