= The Sneetches (band) =

American indie pop/power pop band, 1985–1995

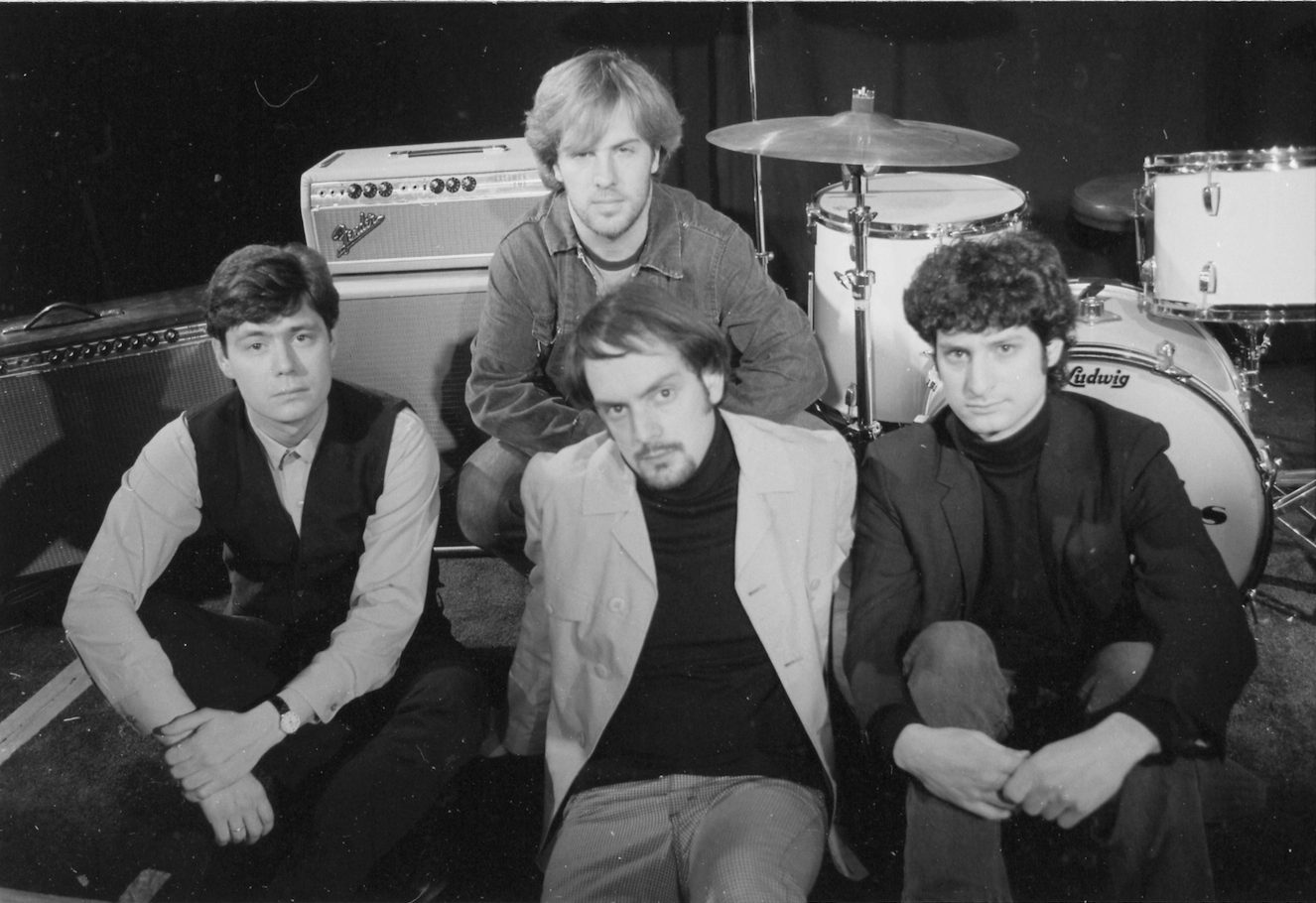
- The Sneetches in 1989 - Daniel Swan, Matt Carges, Alec Palao and Mike Levy

Background information
- Origin: San Francisco, California, United States
- Genres: Indie pop, power pop
- Years active: 1985–1995
- Labels: Kaleidoscope Sound, Creation, Alias, Bus Stop, spinART, Omnivore Recordings
- Past members: Mike Levy; Matt Carges; Daniel Swan; Alejandro "Alec" Palao

The Sneetches were an American indie pop/power pop band formed in San Francisco, California, United States, in 1985, who released several albums before splitting up in the mid-1990s. The band was described by Trouser Press as "one of the most tasteful, consistently tuneful pop bands on the American scene". In 2017, All Music described The Sneetches as "one of the best classic guitar pop bands in the late '80s/early '90s."

The Sneetches stood out amongst the contemporary grunge, industrial and hardcore scenes in the 1980s. Remaining obscure until their breakup during the peak of Britpop, The Sneetches have since gained a cult following.

== History ==
The initial line-up was Mike Levy (vocals, bass) and Matt Carges (guitar) adding English drummer Daniel Swan, formerly of The Cortinas by 1986. The band showed influences from the likes of The Zombies, The Left Banke and The Easybeats, all of whom had tracks covered by The Sneetches. They signed to the London-based Kaleidoscope Sound label, and debuted in 1987 with "Only For a Moment", followed by the mini-album Lights Out! With The Sneetches. They were then signed by Creation Records in the UK and Alias Records in the United States, who issued the band's debut full-length album, Sometimes That's All We Have, in 1989, described by Allmusic as "a masterful album highly recommended to all fans of the style". Levy switched to guitar with the recruitment of former Sting-ray Alejandro "Alec" Palao in 1988. Slow followed on Alias in 1990, the band then moving on to the Bus Stop label for three singles between 1991 and 1993, later compiled on the Think Again compilation.

In 1993, the band recorded a mini-album with Chris Wilson of The Flamin' Groovies, and recorded a final album, Blow Out the Sun, in 1994, before splitting up. A posthumous mini-set, Starfucker, comprising demo recordings of tracks that were not included on Blow Out the Sun, was released by Bus Stop in 1995.

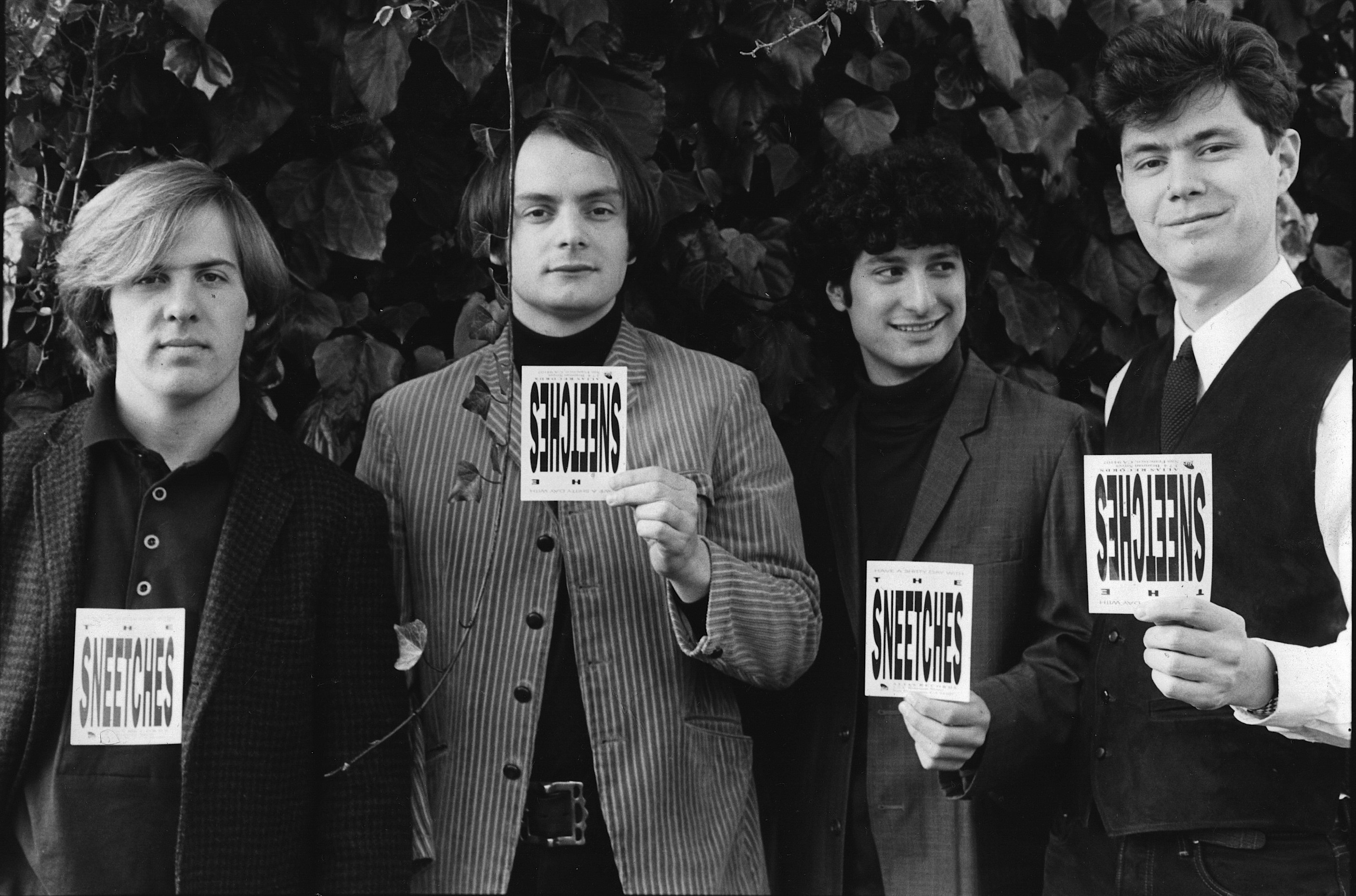
The Sneetches - Oakland, California in 1988

Levy began work on a solo album in 1995, Fireflies, which was eventually released in 2000.

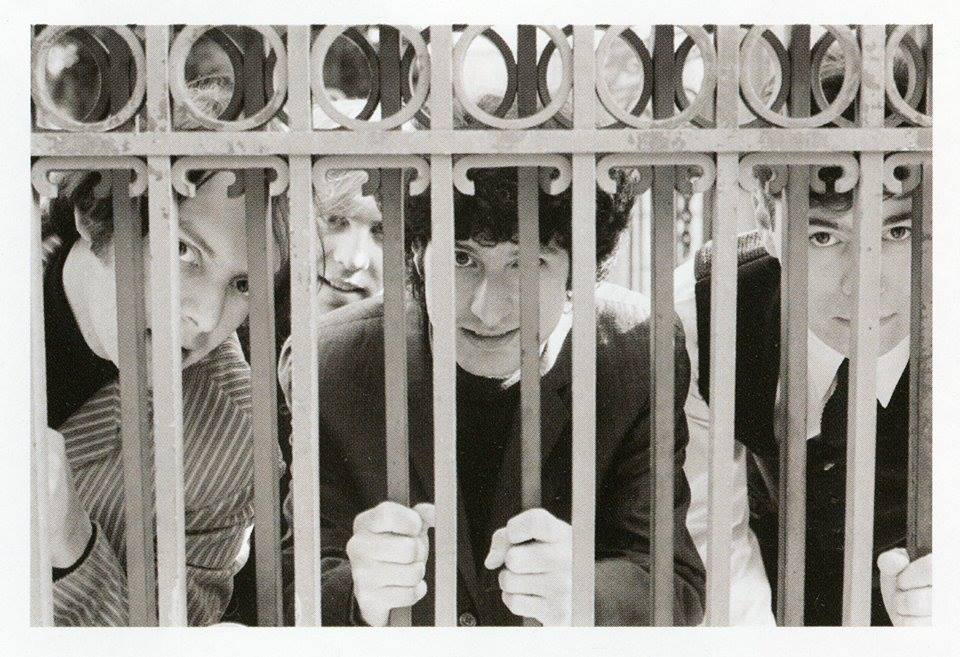
The Sneetches 1989

== 2017 retrospective release Form of Play ==
A 2017 retrospective album Form of Play was reviewed by Coachella Valley Weekly .. "This is a nearly flawless introduction, a perfect addition for anyone who’s worn out their Big Star and Left Banke records. The Sneetches may have never topped the charts, but their quiescent charms continue to resonate." Vinyl District reviewed as follows: "I would submit that Form of Play exemplifies the smart guitar-based pop of a bygone era without succumbing to retread, an appealing trait during their ’80s-’90s existence and even more so now."

=== Reviews for Form of Play ===
"While they may have been an underground sensation, Omnivore Recordings collected the best songs from The Sneetches for their first ever career compilation titled "Form Of Play: A Retrospective."" (JP' Music Blog)

"Form of Play may not be my dream roster of Sneetches songs, but first-person perspective aside it's a representative assemblage of what made these Bay-era popmeisters tick. The few previously unreleased sections are predominantly culled from live performances, but a concluding acoustic demo of "How Does It Feel" channeling Big Star says volumes about where the Sneetches were emanating from." (Willfully Obscure).

"this is a special collection of songs, and while it might not contain everyone’s favorites, what it does offer is a look at a band who deserved far more appreciation than they received. Absolutely essential for all Sneetches fans!" (Elizabeth Klisiewicz] - The Big Take Over"

"Whether you're late on this band or were right on time you'll dig this either way as great songs are great songs."

"Amid the post-punk, indie-rock and the phoenix-like rise of grunge, there was a thread of late-80s pop that focused on melody and craft. The dB’s, Game Theory and Bongos were more cerebral than their power-pop counterparts but no less fetching to listen to. And standing tall artistically, if not in record sales, was San Francisco’s Sneetches. At twenty-two tracks, clocking in at seventy-seven minutes, this is a good buy for those just meeting the band, but also those who collected everything along the way."

"Although these tracks were originally recorded in the ‘80s and ‘90s, they don't sound dated in the least; rather, it's song after song of smart, well-constructed, hooky guitar pop that should have attracted a much larger audience. Tracks such as “...and I'm Thinking” and “I Don't Expect Her For You (Look at That Girl)” still burn with a melodic intensity while also sounding polished (but never slick) – and they're the rule and not the exception."

== Discography ==
=== Albums ===
- Light Out! With The Sneetches (1988) Kaleidocope Sound
- Sometimes That's All We Have (1989) Creation/Alias
- Slow (1990) Alias
- Chris Wilson & The Sneetches (1993) Marilyn
- Blow Out the Sun (1994) spinART
- Starfucker (1995) Bus Stop

=== Compilations ===
- 1985-1991 (1991) Alias
- Think Again (1993) Bus Stop
- Obscureyears (1994) Creation Rev-Ola
- Form of Play: A Retrospective (2017) Omnivore Recordings

=== Singles ===
- "Only for a Moment" / "54 Hours" (1987) Kaleidoscope Sound (UK only release)
- "Please Don't Break My Heart" / "He's Frank" / "Love Comes My Way" (1989) Alias
- "She Does Everything For Me" (1991) Bus Stop
- "...and I'm Thinking" (1992) Bus Stop
- "A Good Thing" (1993) Bus Stop
- "She May Call You Up Tonight" (1993) Jelly Bean
- Sunnyside Down EP (1993) Elefant

=== Promotional videos ===
- "Heloise" (1990)
