= GS I Love You Too: Japanese Garage Bands of the 1960s =

Compilation album
- Released: November 9, 1999
- Recorded: 1960s
- Genre: Group sounds; Garage rock; psychedelic; proto-punk
- Length: 1:17:44
- Label: Big Beat

chronology
GS I Love You: Japanese Garage Bands of the 1960s (1996)	GS I Love You Too: Japanese Garage Bands of the 1960s (1999)

GS I Love You Too: Japanese Garage Bands of the 1960s is the second installment in the GS I Love You CD compilation series, featuring songs from the Group sounds (or GS) movement in Japan during the 1960s (the first CD being GS I Love You). GS was essentially the Japanese variant of garage and psychedelic rock. Japan, like many Western countries, experienced a beat boom in the 1960s as a result of the British Invasion, particularly in the wake of the Beatles' 1966 visit to the country. Though the Japanese beat craze blossomed slightly later than in the West, it stretched well into the end of the decade, with groups continuing to play in the beat/garage style after it had fallen out of favor elsewhere. Surf rock, which had been popular in Japan since before the arrival of the Beatles continued to exert influence on the music throughout the decade. Bands typically sang in both Japanese and English. GS I Love You Too was issued in 1999 by Big Beat Records. Like the first entry in the series, it is noted for good mastering and high sound quality. The front cover sleeve of the CD is adorned with a backdrop of bright red sun rays invoking the pre-WWII (pre-surrender) Japanese imperial flag, and the inside includes English liner notes that provide biographical information about the groups and their songs.

The set commences with "Hanashitakunai" by the Youngers, who re-appear with other up-tempoed, fuzz-laced confections such as "Zin Zin Zin", "My Love, My Love" and "Do the Whip The Carnabeats' frantic British Invasion-inspired sound is featured on several cuts such "Chu Chu Chu", "Sutekina Sandy", "Give Me Lovin'", and "Love Only You". The Tempters are more stylistically and rhythmically diverse as evidenced in "Himitsu No Haikutoba", "Kono Mune Ni Dakishimete", "Bokutachi Tenshi", and "Kamisama Onegai". The Jaguars start with "Dancing Lonely Night" but then venture into the album's most intense flight into psychedelia with "Seaside Bound", then return with "Stop the Music", and "Beat Train". The Savage provide a surf rock instrumental in "Space Express". Lind & the Linders manage to combine 60s garage raunch with pop polish in "Koi Ni Shiberete".

== Track listing ==
1. The Youngers: "Hanashitakunai" 2:41
2. The Jaguars: "Dancing Lonely Night" (Kunihiko Suzuki) 3:01
3. The Carnabeats: "Chu Chu Chu" 2:50
4. The D'Swooners: "Please Please Trina" (Ronnie Parina) 2:05
5. The Tempters: "Himitsu No Haikutoba" (Yoshiharu Matuzaki) 2:53
6. The Carnabeats: "Sutekina Sandy" (Ai Takano) 2:37
7. The Youngers: "Zin Zin Zin" 3:00
8. The Tempters: "Tell Me More" 3:44
9. The Jaguars: Seaside Bound 3:10
10. The D'Swooners: "Stone Free" (Jimi Hendrix) 5:24
11. The Savage: "Space Express" 2:23
12. Lind & The Linders: "Koi Ni Shiberete" 3:04
13. The Tempters: "Kidotta Ano Ko" (Yoshiharu Matuzaki) 2:48
14. The Carnabeats: "Give Me Lovin'" (Bill Schnare) 2:49
15. The Jaguars: "Dancin' Baby" (Hisayuki Okitsu) 2:44
16. The Tempters: "Stop the Music" (Milton Subotsky/Clive Westlake) 3:02
17. The Youngers: "My Love, My Love" 2:47
18. The Tempters: "Kono Mune Ni Dakishimete" (Yoshiharu Matuzaki) 2:11
19. The Carnabeats: "Love Only for You" 3:14
20. Lind & the Linders: "Yuhi Yo Isoge" (Hiroshi Kato) 2:56
21. The Jaguars: "Beat Train" (Yukio Miya) 2:55
22. The Tempters: "Bokutachi No Tenshi" (Yoshiharu Matuzaki) 3:10
23. The Youngers: "Do the Whip" (Jesse James) 2:24
24. The Jaguars: "Taiyoh Yaroh" (Tokiko Iwatani) 2:00
25. The Carnabeats: "Kanashami No Bell" 2:49
26. The Tempters: "Wasure Emu Kimi" (Yoshiharu Matuzaki) 2:52
27. The Tempters: "Kamisama Onegai" (Yoshiharu Matuzaki) 2:11
