= Alec Palao =

British music historian

- Born: 1962 (age 63–64); Archway, North London, England
- Education: King's College, University of London
- Occupations: Musician, music historian, writer, reissue producer

Alejandro "Alec" Palao (born 1962) is a British musician, music historian, writer, and reissue producer. In addition to his musical output with groups like the Sting-rays, the Sneetches, and Mushroom, his works include hundreds of production credits and liner notes on important compilations of vintage rock and soul from Ace Records, Rhino Records, and others, plus a wide array of music-related print and film credits. Palao is unusual in that he normally supervises each aspect of the projects he compiles, including audio transfers and restoration as well as research and liner notes. Honors include six Grammy Award nominations for historical albums and liner notes.

== Early life ==
Born "just as 'Love Me Do' was entering the UK charts in late 1962", Palao grew up in the Crouch End area of North London. His first recollection of pop music was hearing Amen Corner's "If Paradise Is Half as Nice" on the radio. His first of many record purchases was "Hey Rock and Roll" by Showaddywaddy though he "did also really like Bowie, Sparks, Roxy, T. Rex and hipper stuff". As a musician (piano, drums, bass, guitar) in the Sting-rays, he developed an early interest in punk, rockabilly, 1960s garage rock, and soul.

== Career ==
After graduating from the University of London in 1985, Palao relocated to California in 1988. He joined a local alternative pop band, the Sneetches, and in 1990 co-founded Cream Puff War magazine to chronicle the musical history of the San Francisco Bay Area. Working as a consultant with Ace Records, he researched and compiled the Nuggets from the Golden State series for their Big Beat Records subsidiary, followed by many other releases. As a U.S. resident, Palao further assisted the label's general release schedule by traversing the country to copy or acquire numerous vintage music catalogs on their behalf.

In 1998, he was a major participant in efforts by Rhino Records to expand the original Nuggets album as a series of box sets, followed by work with Light in the Attic, Omnivore, Numero, Craft, and others. In 2007, he was one of four recipients of the Greg Shaw Award for Outstanding Contributions to Popular Culture Preservation. He was the "producer, writer, and principal researcher" on the 2014 film The Seeds: Pushin' Too Hard.

As "one of the Bay Area's most notable collectors of 1960s rock and roll and soul music", he said in a 2019 interview, "My priority is turning people on to music, especially if they have never heard it before." Another interviewer called him "internationally recognized as one of the true champions of the American garage band movement".

He has said of his compilation efforts, "... my predilection is always to ferret out stuff that either hasn't been out before ... or can stand a major upgrade. I prefer to rehabilitate rather than regurgitate." He also added, "I haven't done much writing outside of liner notes .... Rather than be a commentator, I like to be the person whose work gets commented on."

He has at various times been a member of the Charity Case, Rain Parade, Mushroom, the Maydays, Slaughter Joe & the Modern Folk Quintet, the Hellenes, Magic Christian, Tall Poppy Syndrome, and other groups. His current project is Strangers in a Strange Land with vocalist Paul Kopf. Palao has also performed and recorded with Country Joe McDonald, the Seeds, the Chocolate Watchband, the Beau Brummels, and the Flamin' Groovies. As of 2026, he is a consultant to Ace Records.

== Grammy Awards ==
Year	Category	Nominated work	Result
2008	Best Historical Album	Love Is the Song We Sing: San Francisco Nuggets 1965–1970	Nominated
2011	Best Historical Album	Where the Action Is! Los Angeles Nuggets: 1965–1968	Nominated
2012	Best Album Notes	The Music City Story: Street Corner Doo Wop, Raw R&B and Soulful Sounds from Berkeley, California 1950-75	Nominated
2014	Best Album Notes	Country Joe and the Fish: Electric Music for the Mind and Body (reissue)	Nominated
2015	Best Album Notes	I'm Just Like You: Sly's Stone Flower 1969–70	Nominated
2026	Best Album Notes	The First Family: Live at Winchester Cathedral 1967	Nominated

== Published works ==
=== Selected production credits ===
Producer credits on major releases:

- Various: GS I Love You: Japanese Garage Bands of the 1960s (Big Beat CDWIKD 159, 1996)
- The Zombies: Zombie Heaven (Big Beat Records ZOMBOX 7, 1997)
- The Ace of Cups: It's Bad For You But Buy It (Big Beat CDWIKD 236, 2003)
- Darondo: Listen To My Song: The Music City Sessions (BGP CDBGPD 233, 2011)
- Sylvie Vartan: en anglais . . . et en américaine (Ace CDCHD 1489, 2016)
- Various: Making Time: A Shel Talmy Production (Ace CDCHD 1497, 2017)
- Various: An A-Square Compilation (Third Man TMR-496, 2018)
- Dyke & The Blazers: Down On Funky Broadway: Phoenix 1966-67 / I Got a Message: Hollywood 1968-70 (Craft Recordings CR00322 / CR00323, 2021)
- The Beau Brummels: Turn Around: The Complete Recordings 1964-70 (Now Sounds QCRNOWBX58, 2021)
- The Sons of Adam: Saturday's Sons: The Complete Recordings 1964-1966 (High Moon CDHMR 13X, 2022)

=== Selected liner notes ===
See Grammy Awards section for nominated entries.

- Dan Hicks: Early Muses (Big Beat Records 183, 1998)
- Creedence Clearwater Revival: Box Set (Fantasy 5CCRCD-4434-2, 2001)
- Various: Love That Louie: The 'Louie Louie' Files (Ace Records CSCHD 844, 2002)
- The Gosdin Brothers: Sounds of Goodbye (Big Beat CDWIKD 235, 2003)
- The Sonics: Psycho-Sonic (Big Beat CDWIKD 115, 2003)
- Various: Hollywood Maverick: The Gary S. Paxton Story (Ace CDCHD 1073, 2006)
- Dan Penn: The Fame Recordings (Ace CDCHD 1353, 2012)
- Various: Lenny Kaye Presents Lightning Striking (Ace CDTOP2 1606, 2021)
- David Bowie: The Shel Talmy Recordings (Parlophone/Warner, 2026)

=== Articles and essays ===
Selected works from books, magazines, and music publications:

- Palao, Alec (1993). "Chocolate Watchband: The Magical Band". Cream Puff War. No. 2. Santa Clara, CA: Palao-Cost. p. 41.
- ————— (1993). "The Continuing Adventures of Bard Dupont: Introducing The Outfit". Cream Puff War. No. 2. Santa Clara, CA: Palao-Cost. p. 87.
- ————— (1998). "Tell It to Me Slowly, I Really Want to Know: The Making of Odessey & Oracle" (CD liner notes). Odessey & Oracle 30th Anniversary Edition. London: Big Beat Records CDWIKD 181.
- ————— (1998). "Get Me to the World On Time" (CD liner notes). Nuggets: Original Artyfacts from the First Psychedelic Era, 1965–1968. Los Angeles: Rhino R2 75466.
- ————— (2001). "White Whale: The Moby Dick of Bubble-Pop". In Kim Cooper; David Smay (eds.). Bubblegum Music is the Naked Truth. Port Townsend, WA: Feral House. p. 239. ISBN 978-0922915699.
- ————— (2006). "Introduction". In Bruce Tahsler (ed.). The San Francisco East Bay 60's Scene. San Francisco: Teens N' Twenties. ISBN 978-0578131955.
- ————— (2009). "A Certain Magic: Track Notes" (CD liner notes). Big Star - Keep An Eye on the Sky. Los Angeles: Rhino Records R2 519760.
- ————— (2011). "The Sound of Fame" (CD liner notes). The Fame Studios Story. London: Kent Records KENTBOX 12.
- ————— (2018). "Twenty Four Hours Every Day" (CD liner notes). The Action – Shadows and Reflections. London: Grapefruit CRSEGBK045.

=== Film ===
- Interview: A Life in the Death of Joe Meek (2013)
- Producer: The Seeds: Pushin' Too Hard (2014)
- Interview: On the Sly: In Search of the Family Stone (2017)

== Discography ==
Palao's recordings include singles, EPs, and albums with multiple artists as a bassist, drummer, and songwriter.

=== Albums ===
- The Sting-rays
  - Dinosaurs (1983)
  - Live Retaliation (1985)
  - Cryptic and Coffee Time (1987)
  - The Essential (Early) Sting-rays Recordings 1982 to 1985 (1987)
  - Come On Kid! Live '84 (1991, VHS)
  - From the Kitchen Sink (2002)
  - Live at the Klub Foot 1984 (2010)
- Slaughter Joe
  - All Around My Hobby Horse's Head (with the Modern Folk Quintet) (1987)
  - The Pied Piper of Feedback (1990)
  - Zé Do Caixão (2003)
  - A Collection (2012)
- The Sneetches
  - Slow (1990)
  - 1985-1991 (1991)
  - Pop! (with Chris Wilson) (1993)
  - Think Again (1993)
  - Blow Out the Sun (1994)
  - Obscureyears (1994)
  - Starfucker (1995)
  - Form of Play: A Retrospective (2017)
- Mushroom
  - Alive and in Full Bloom (1998)
  - Cream of Mushroom (1998)
  - Hydrogen Jukebox (1999)
  - Analog Hi-Fi Surprise (1999)
  - Leni Riefenstahl (2000)
  - Compared To What (2001) (Note: Appeared on one track: "Let's Have Sex".)
  - Oh, But They're Weird & They're Wonderful (2002) (Note: Appeared on three tracks.)
  - Really Don't Mind If You Sit This One Out (2006)
  - Naked, Stoned, & Stabbed (2010)
- Matt Piucci: Hellenes (2000)
- Mike Levy: Fireflies (2001)
- The Chocolate Watchband
  - Get Away (2000)
  - This Is My Voice (2018)
- Gib Guilbeau: Songs I Like (2003)
- Magic Christian
  - Limited Edition Authorized Bootleg (2004)
  - Magic Christian (2005)
  - Live at the Great American Music Hall (2005)
  - Too Close to Zero (2006)
  - Evolver (2009)
  - Turn Up the Heat (2011)
- Penelope Houston: On Market Street (2012)
- Rain Parade: San Francisco 2012 (2013)
- The Beau Brummels: Continuum (2013) (Note: Appeared on one track: "Silver Slipper Cafe".)
- The Charity Case: How to Fall (2016)
- The Hellenes: I Love You All the Animals (2017)
- The Flamin' Groovies: Fantastic Plastic (2017)
- Strangers in a Strange Land
  - Strangers in a Strange Land (2017)
  - Broken Tambourine (2020)
- Tall Poppy Syndrome
  - Come Some Christmas Eve (or Halloween) (2021)

=== Singles ===
- Carla Olson with Tall Poppy Syndrome, “Is It True” (2025)

=== Compilation appearances ===
- These Cats Ain't Nothing But Trash (1983): The Sting-rays: "I Want My Woman", "The Cat", "Dinosaurs", "Math of Trend"
- Revenge of the Killer Pussies (Blood on the Cats #2) (1984): The Sting-rays: "Escalator", The Bananamen: "Psychotic Reaction"
- Stomping at the Klub Foot (1987): The Sting-rays: "I Can Satisfy You", "Escalator", "Time Is After You", "Blue Girl"
- The Klub Foot Kicks Back (1987): The Sting-rays: "Escalator"
- The Magnificent Seven (1987): The Sting-rays: "Militant Tendency", "June Rhyme"
- Acoustic Music Project (1990): The Sneetches: "Everybody's Talkin'"
- 20 Explosive Dynamic Super Smash Hit Explosions! (1991): The Sneetches: "I Wanna Be with You"
- Single Minded - The Big Beat Singles (1992): The Sting-rays: "Another Cup of Coffee", "You're Gonna Miss Me", "Escalator", "Don't Break Down", The Bananamen: "Love Me", "Surfin' Bird"
- The Seventh ADventure (1992): The Sneetches: "A Good Thing"
- Super Fantastic Mega Smash Hits! (1995): The Sneetches with Shoes: "I Wanna Be With You"
- Sing Hollies in Reverse (1995): The Sneetches: "So Lonely"
- This Note's for You Too! A Tribute to Neil Young (1999): Matt Piucci: "Down to the Wire", Mushroom: "The Emperor of Wyoming"
- Left of the Dial: Dispatches from the '80s Underground (2004): Rain Parade: "I Look Around"
- Rockin' With Morrissey's Side-Men (2006): The Sting-rays: "June Rhyme", "Wedding Ring"
- Children of Nuggets: Original Artyfacts from the Second Psychedelic Era, 1976–1995 (2005): The Sting-rays: "Don't Break Down"
- Skrang: Sounds Like Bobby Sutliff (2013): Matt Piucci with Rain Parade: "That Stupid Idea"
- Timemazine CD #4 (2017): The Chocolate Watchband: "No Way Out"
- Just A Bad Dream: Sixty British Garage and Trash Nuggets 1981-89 (2018): The Sting-rays: "June Rhyme", The Bananamen: "The Crusher"
- FUCKEDUPNSTEAMININPORTSMOUTHGREATBRITAINXXX (2019): The Sting-rays: "Hopelessness of the Human Race", "June Rhyme", "Save the Tiger", "Never Had It So Good", "Militant Tendency", "The Big Tide Will Turn", "Behind the Beyond", "Don't Break Down"

Discography notes

== Personal life ==
Alec Palao lives in the San Francisco Bay Area with his "long-suffering, endlessly supportive" wife, vintage clothier Cindy Vorte.
