= Figure (music) =

Shortest phrase in music, a short succession of notes

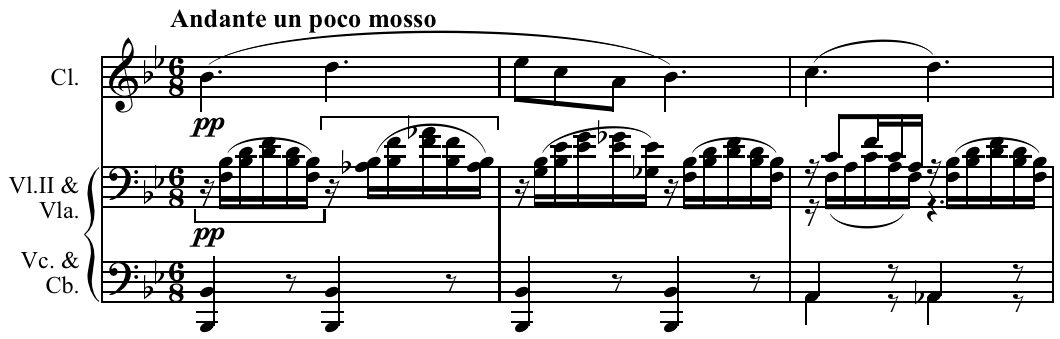
Accompaniment figures in Schubert's Octet, Op. 166.

A musical figure or figuration is the shortest idea in music; a short succession of notes, often recurring. It may have melodic pitch, harmonic progression, and rhythmic meter. The 1964 Grove's Dictionary defines the figure as "the exact counterpart of the German 'motiv' and the French 'motif'": it produces a "single complete and distinct impression". To the self-taught Roger Scruton, however, a figure is distinguished from a motif in that a figure is background while a motif is foreground:

A figure resembles a moulding in architecture: it is 'open at both ends', so as to be endlessly repeatable. In hearing a phrase as a figure, rather than a motif, we are at the same time placing it in the background, even if it is ... strong and melodious

— Roger Scruton, The Aesthetics of Music

Allen Forte describes the term figuration as being applied to two distinct things:

If the term is used alone it usually refers to instrumental figurations such as [Alberti bass and a measured trill]... The term figuration is also used to describe the general process of melodic embellishment. Thus, we often read of "figurated" melody or of chorale "figuration." ... Figuration has nothing to do with figured bass, except insofar as numerals often designate embellishing notes.

— Allen Forte, Tonal Harmony in Concept and Practice

A phrase originally presented or heard as a motif may become a figure that accompanies another melody, such as in the second movement of Claude Debussy's String Quartet. It is perhaps best to view a figure as a motif when it has special importance in a piece. According to White, motives are, "significant in the structure of the work," while figures or figurations are not and, "may often occur in accompaniment passages or in transitional or connective material designed to link two sections together," with the former being more common.

Minimalist music may be constructed entirely from figures. Scruton describes music by Philip Glass such as Akhnaten as "nothing but figures...endless daisy-chains".

A basic figure is known as a riff in American popular music.

== Importance of figures ==
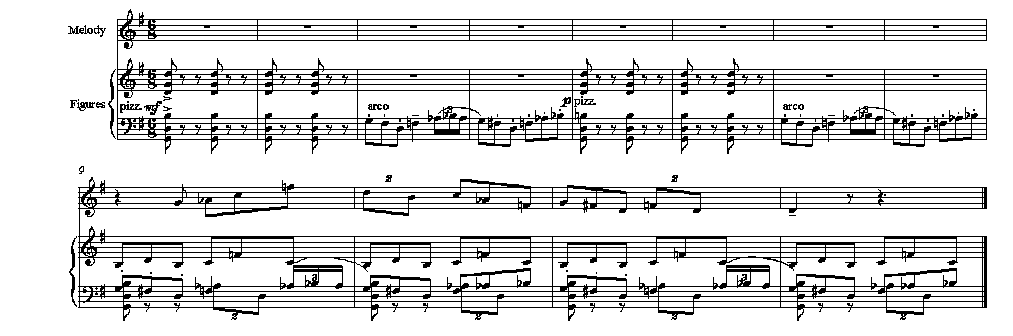
A phrase originally presented as a motif may become a figure which accompanies another melody, as in the second movement of Claude Debussy's String Quartet (1893). White would classify the accompaniment as motivic material since it was, "derived from an important motive stated earlier."

Figures play a most important part in instrumental music, in which it is necessary that a strong and definite impression should be produced to answer the purpose of words, and convey the sense of vitality to the otherwise incoherent succession of sounds. In pure vocal music, this is not the case, as on the one hand, the words assist the audience to follow and understand what they hear, and on the other, the quality of voices in combination is such as to render strong characteristic features somewhat inappropriate. But without strongly marked figures, the very reason of existence of instrumental movements can hardly be perceived, and the success of a movement of any dimensions must ultimately depend, to a very large extent, on the appropriate development of the figures which are contained in the chief subjects. The common expression that a subject is very 'workable,' merely means that it contains well-marked figures; though it must be observed on the other hand, that there are not a few instances in which masterly treatment has invested with powerful interest a figure which at first sight would seem altogether deficient in character.

== Examples ==
As clear an instance as could be given of the breaking up of a subject into its constituent figures for the purpose of development, is the treatment of the first subject of Beethoven's Pastoral Symphony, which he breaks up into three figures corresponding to the first three bars.

As an example of his treatment of (a) may be taken—

(b) is twice repeated no less than thirty-six times successively in the development of the movement; and (c) appears at the close as follows:

Examples of this kind of treatment of the figures contained in subjects are very numerous in classical instrumental music, in various degrees of refinement and ingenuity; as in the 1st movement of Mozart's G minor Symphony; in the same movement of Beethoven's 8th Symphony; and in a large number of Bach's fugues, as for instance Nos. 2, 7, 16, of the Das Wohltemperirte Clavier. The beautiful little musical poem, the 18th fugue of that series, contains as happy a specimen of this device as could be cited.

=== Bach and Beethoven ===
Bach and Beethoven are acknowledged masters in the use of figures, and they were both content at times to make a short figure of three or four notes the basis of a whole movement. Examples of this are the rhythmic figure of the C minor Symphony (d), the figure of the Scherzo of the 9th Symphony (e), and the figure of the first movement of the last Sonata, in C minor (f). An example from Bach is the Adagio from the Toccata in D minor (g), but there are many other examples to be found in his body of work.

A very peculiar use which Bach occasionally makes of figures, is to use one as the bond of connection running through a whole movement by constant repetition, as in Prelude No. 10 of Das Wohltemperirte Clavier, and in the slow movement of the Italian Concerto, where it serves as accompaniment to an impassioned recitative. In this case the figure is not identical on each repetition, but is freely modified, in such a way however that it is always recognized as the same, partly by the rhythm and partly by the relative positions of the successive notes. This manner of modifying a given figure shows a tendency in the direction of a mode of treatment which has become a feature in modern music: namely, the practice of transforming figures in order to show different aspects of the same thought, or to establish a connection between one thought and another by bringing out the characteristics they possess in common. As a simple specimen of this kind of transformation, may be quoted a passage from the first movement of Brahms's P.F. Quintet in F minor. The figure stands at first as at (h), then by transposition as at (i). Its first stage of transformation is (j); further (k) (l) (m) are progressive modifications towards the stage (n),

which, having been repeated twice in different positions, appears finally as the figure immediately attached to the Cadence in D♭, thus—

A similar example is at the end of Beethoven's Overture to Coriolan.

The use which Wagner makes of strongly marked figures is very important, as he establishes a consistent connection between the characters and situations and the music by using appropriate figures (Leitmotive), which appear whenever the ideas or characters to which they belong come prominently forward.

That figures vary in intensity to an immense degree hardly requires to be pointed out; and it will also be obvious that figures of accompaniment do not require to be so marked as figures which occupy positions of individual importance. With regard to the latter it may be remarked that there is hardly any department in music in which true feeling and inspiration are more absolutely indispensable, since no amount of ingenuity or perseverance can produce such figures as that which opens the C-minor Symphony, or such soul-moving figures as those in the death march of Siegfried in Wagner's 'Götterdammerung.'

As the common notion that music chiefly consists of pleasant tunes grows weaker, the importance of figures becomes proportionately greater. A succession of isolated tunes is always more or less inconsequent, however deftly they may be connected together, but by the appropriate use of figures and groups of figures, such as real musicians only can invent, and the gradual unfolding of all their latent possibilities, continuous and logical works of art may be constructed; such as will not merely tickle the hearer's fancy, but arouse profound interest, and raise him mentally and morally to a higher standard.

== See also ==
- Alberti bass
