= GS I Love You: Japanese Garage Bands of the 1960s =

Compilation album
- Released: July 16, 1996
- Recorded: 1960s
- Genre: Group sounds; Garage rock; psychedelic; proto-punk
- Length: 1:14:01
- Label: Big Beat

chronology
GS I Love You: Japanese Garage Bands of the 1960s (1996)	GS I Love You Too: Japanese Garage Bands of the 1960s (1996)

GS I Love You: Japanese Garage Bands of the 1960s is a compilation album featuring songs from the Group sounds (or GS) movement in Japan during the 1960s, which was essentially the Japanese variant of garage and psychedelic rock. Japan, like many Western countries, experienced a beat boom in the 1960s as a result of the British Invasion, particularly in the wake of The Beatles' 1966 visit to the country. Though the Japanese beat craze blossomed slightly later than in the West, it stretched well into the end of the decade, with groups continuing to play in the beat/garage style after it had fallen out of favor elsewhere. Surf rock, which had been popular in Japan since before the arrival of the Beatles continued to exert influence on the music throughout the decade. Bands typically sang in both Japanese and English. Produced by Alec Palao, GS I Love You was issued in 1996 by Big Beat Records and is available on compact disc. It features 28 tracks originally released on the Crown and Teichiku labels and is the first installment in the series, which currently is made up of two entries--the second of which is GS I Love You Too. The series is noted for good mastering and high sound quality. The brightly colored psychedelic style packaging includes English liner notes on the inside providing biographical information about the groups and their songs.

The Out Cast open the set with the hard-driving "You Got a Call Me" and supply additional fuzz-drenched mayhem in subsequent cuts such as "Everything's Alright", "Let's Go on the Beach", "Bokuno Sobakara", then close out the set with three tracks, ending with "Jane Jane". The Spiders, who are perhaps the best-known group on the compilation, appear in several places such as "Dynamite", "Furi Furi", and their version of the Surfaris' classic surf instrumental, "Wipe Out". The Blue Jeans' "One More Please" aptly fuses pop and primitivism. The Cougars do "Aphrodite" and "Suki Nanda". The group, Playboy, are featured on two cuts "Shevidevi de Yuko" and "Kaette Okure". The Swing West performs "Kokoro No Tokimeki (Ajoen Ajoen) in Japanese, then tackles a rendition of Arthur Brown's "Fire". The Burns tip their hats to the Beatles in "I Saw Her Standing There" and the Voltage cover Issac Hayes' soul classic made famous by Sam & Dave, "Hold On! I'm Comin'".

== Track listing ==
1. The Out Cast: "You Gat a Call Me" 2:44
2. The Out Cast: "Everything's Alright" (Nickey Crouch/Keith Karlson/John Konrad) 2:10
3. The Spiders: "Dynamite" 2:52
4. The Spiders: "Monkey Dance" 2:36
5. The Blue Jeans: "One More Please" 2:53
6. The Terrys: "Stop Dance" 2:26
7. Playboy: "Shevidevi de Yuko" 2:16
8. Playboy: "Kaette Okure" 2:17
9. The Swing West: "Kokoro No Tokimeki (Ajoen Ajoen)" 2:37
10. The Swing West: "Fire" (Arthur Brown/Vincent Crane/Mike Finesilver/Peter Ker) 2:50
11. The Rangers: "Let's Go Rangers" 1:59
12. Napoleon: "Koi O Kesunda" 2:44
13. The Cougars: "Aphrodite" 2:30
14. Cougars: "Suki Nanda" 3:33
15. The Spiders: "Wipe Out" (Bob Berryhill/Patrick Connolly/Jim Fuller/Ron Wilson) 2:34
16. The Spiders: "Furi Furi" 3:10
17. The Burns: "I Saw Her Standing There" (John Lennon/Paul McCartney) 2:51
18. The Days & Nights: "Bara O Anokoni" 2:54
19. The Out Cast: "Let's Go on the Beach" 2:47
20. The Out Cast: "Bokuno Sobakara" 2:32
21. The Voltage: "Hold On! I'm Comin'" (Isaac Hayes/David Porter) 2:58
22. The Cougars: "J & A" 2:55
23. The Spiders: "Seishun a Go-Go" 2:22
24. The Van-Dogs: "Hey Girl" (Don Backy) 3:11
25. The Toys: "Omiyasan" 2:45
26. The Out Cast: "Long Tall Sally" (Robert "Bumps" Blackwell/Enotris Johnson/Richard Penniman/ Little Richard) 2:53
27. The Out Cast: "Kimamana Shelly" 2:18
28. The Out Cast w/ Miki Obata: "Jane Jane" (Miki Obata) 2:36
