= Now Hear This! Garage & Beat from the Norman Petty Vaults =

Compilation album
- Released: March 19, 2007
- Recorded: 1960s
- Genre: Garage rock
- Length: 1:00:30
- Label: Big Beat

Now Hear This! Garage & Beat from the Norman Petty Vaults is a compilation that highlights recordings by garage rock acts made at Norman Petty Recording Studios in Clovis, New Mexico during the 1960s. Norman Petty is best known for his work as the producer on Buddy Holly's records in the 1950s, many of which were recorded at the Clovis facility. He continued to produce records in the 1960s, providing a regular recording stop for a handful of the plentiful bands working at the time, particularly in the wake of the British Invasion. The set, put out in 2007 by Big Beat Records, features twenty five tracks that encompass the broad stylistic range of the garage genre, many displaying clear British Invasion influence, and Petty's production lends most of the tracks with a certain level of polish and professionalism not always associated with the genre. The collection is well-mastered, displaying generally high sound quality throughout and the packaging includes well-researched liner notes highlighting the artists and their songs. Dan Auerbach of the Black Keys, in a piece he wrote in the December 25, 2008 issue of Rolling Stone, mentioned this album as one of his favorite compilations.

The set begins with the Crickets, Buddy Holly's former group, doing the title track "Now Hear This", which displays a clear British Invasion-influenced sound that departs from their earlier, more familiar style. The Cinders are featured on several tracks, beginning with the second cut "Three Minutes Time". They do a version of Van Morrison's near-obligatory garage band standard, "Gloria". The Perils' "Hate" provides the compilation's darkest moment, an eerie and brooding invective with lyrics that deliver a seething rebuke to a former lover, set to the slow drumbeat of a funeral dirge. The Cords appear on two cuts, beginning with the moody "Too Late to Kiss You" and then later "Sin Crazed Woman". The Teardrops do the Farfisa organ-drenched "Sweet Sweet Sadie", and the Monacles appear with "Let Your Lovin' Grow". Barry Allen with Wes Dakus' Rebels do four cuts including the oft-recorded "And My Baby's Gone", "Danger Zone", and the set's closer, "Love Me Again".

== Track listing ==
1. The Crickets: "Now Hear This" (Jerry Allison/Buzz Cason)2:17
2. The Cinders: "Three Minutes Time" (Louis Ridings) 2:15
3. Trolls: "I Don't Recall" 2:35
4. Chances Are: "Get Out of My Life" (Sandy Salisbury) 1:52
5. Perils: "Hate" (Dave Brooks/Eddie Reed) 2:15
6. The Cinders: "Good Lovin's Hard to Find" (Bill Ewton, Eddie Reeves)2:22 Spotify
7. The Teardrops: "Sweet Sweet Sadie" (Ron Myers) 2:12
8. The Cords: "Too Late to Kiss You Now" 2:34
9. Barry Allen with Wes Dakus' Rebels: "And My Baby's Gone" (Denny Laine/Michael Pinder)2:24
10. The Venturie 5: "Ma'am" 2:38
11. The Chances: "It's Only Time" 2:31 (Sandy Salisbury) 3:22
12. Stu Mitchell & Doug Roberts: "Say I Am (What I Am)" (Barbara Tomsco/George Tomsco) 2:21
13. The Famous Last Words: "Hey Little Schoolgirl" (Richard Terry) 2:22
14. Barry Allen with Wes Dakus' Rebels: "Danger Zone" (Steve Cropper/Wilson Pickett Jr.) 2:53
15. Jimmy Gilmer & the Fireballs: "Come to Me" (Norman Petty) 2:05
16. The Morfomen: "Write Me a Letter" (Dave Rarick) 2:01
17. Tom Beal: "That Girl Isn't Comin' Today" 2:13
18. The Cinders: "Gloria" (Van Morrison) 2:56
19. Three of a Kind: "Only Time Will Tell" 2:01
20. Wes Dakus' Rebels: "Shotgun" (Autry DeWalt II) 2:54
21. The Cords: "Sin Crazed Woman" 2:36
22. The Cinders: "Barbara White" (Louis Ridings/Steve Dodge) 2:33
23. The Monocles: "Let Your Lovin' Grow" (Robb Casseday/Jon Floth/Don Hirschfield/Rick Hull) 2:01
24. Barry Allen with Wes Dakus' Rebels: 2:17

== Catalogue and release information ==
- Now Hear This! Garage & Beat From the Norman Petty Vaults (Big Beat, 2007)
