= Yeah Yeah Yeah (compilation) =

Compilation album
- Released: March 15, 1999
- Recorded: 1960s
- Genre: Garage rock; psychedelic
- Length: 70 minutes
- Label: Arf! Arf!

chronology
No No No (1998)	Yeah Yeah Yeah (1999)

Yeah Yeah Yeah is a compilation of garage rock recording from the 1960s issued by Arf! Arf! Records, and is available exclusively on compact disc. In keeping with the sub-heading that reads "28 Mega-Manic & Elusive '60s Garage Punkers", the set features mainly upbeat and hard-rocking examples of the genre, whereas Arf! Arf!'s previously released companion piece No No No, focuses instead on moody ballads and downcast songs of lament. In customary fashion, the rear sleeve includes a brash description of the contents contained within:

Though large scale success eluded these prophetic '60s combos, consider them the foot soldiers in the Holy War against the establishment. No shit Sherlock—this is the real thing: raw, crude, brutally honest and never to be forgotten.

Also included in the packaging is statement much in the same vein that reads "Warning: this product may be addictive and lead to mental deterioration." As is usually the case with Arf! Arf!, the mastering and sound quality is high. Though the set has no liner notes, but it in the inner sleeve it displays a layout of photographs of the original record labels from the original 45s. The front cover features a picture of the Nightrockers who sing "Junction No. 1", which is included in this compilation.

The set commences with "I Know How" by the Maniacs, followed by the psychedelic "Down" by the Rockin' Roadruners, which begins with cryptic space-like effects, then transitions into upbeat rock and roll, including a "Paperback Writer"-inspired melody and a bee-sting guitar solo. The Little Bits from Jennings, Louisiana are featured on "Girl, Give Me Love"." The Barons from Orlando supply just enough fuzz to help drive the steam-driven pulse of "Drawbridge. The Hallucinations play the most melodic cut on the set with "You Say You Love Me." Using the motif of UFO's, Alabama's the K-pers use the motif of UFOs to lampoon the cold war in "the Red Invaders," which is followed by a similar flying saucer "caper" done by Young Savages, "The Invaders are Coming"—but in this song the aliens are humans out to steal the first person-narrator's girlfriend. The Rocks perform "Because We're Young, a slow blues protest against the older generation. "Your Driving Me Insane" features one of Lou Reed's earlier pre-Velevets' outings in the Roughnecks. The Friars of Youth appear in two cuts, beginning with 1965's "All You Wanted was a Stand By", followed by a frantic anthem about a go dancer, "a Playboy picture from the pinup page", "Sparrley Manurpuss". The set closes with the Batman riff of "Comin' Down" by the Boy Blues.

== Track listing ==
1. The Maniacs: "Now I Know" (Gerry Grossman)
2. The Rockin' Roadrunners: "Down"
3. Little Bits: "Girl Give Me Love"
4. The Contemporaries: "Fool for Temptation" (Doug Allen)
5. Barons: "Drawbridge"
6. Zone V: "I Cannot Lie"
7. Colony: "Pseudo Psycho Intuition"
8. The Shoremen "She's Bad"
9. The Shades: "With My Love"
10. The Mod IV: "What Can I Do"
11. The Barracudas: "It's High Time"
12. The Nightrockers: "Junction No. 1"
13. The Id: "Stop and Look"
14. The Hallucinations: "You Say You Love Me
15. Sophomores: "Mama Wears the Pants"
16. Apollo's Apaches: "Be Good to Me"
17. The K-Pers: "The Red Invasion" (Richard Calhoun/Mitch Goodson)
18. The Young Savages: "The Invaders Are Coming"
19. The Skeptics: "Wondering"
20. Worryin' Kind: "Wild About You"
21. Roving Mob: "You're the One" (J.J. Campbell/Patrick Williams)
22. The Rocks: "Because We're Young"
23. The Midnight Shift: "Never Gonna Stop Lovin' You"
24. The Roughnecks: "You're Driving Me Insane"
25. Friars Of Youth: "All You Wanted Was a Stand By"
26. The Friars Of Youth: "Sparrley Manurpuss" (Max Butler/Marty Conn)
27. The Early Americans: "Night After Night" (Fuentes)
28. The Boy Blues: "Coming Down to You"

== Catalogue and release information ==
- Compact disc (Arf! Arf! AACC-075)
