= It Came from the Garage! Nuggets from Southern California =

Compilation album
- Released: March 26, 2007
- Recorded: 1964–1967
- Genres: Garage rock; psychedelic
- Label: Big Beat

It Came from the Garage! Nuggets from Southern California is a garage rock compilation that features music made by acts who recorded for Downey Records in Downey, California during the 1960s. The label was founded by brothers Jack and Bill Wenzel, who had previously owned a local music shop. The compilation contains 24 tracks and was issued in 1997 by Big Beat Records, making it the third collection offered by Big Beat to feature material from the Downey archives. The set represents the diversity of the genre ranging from typical three-chord fare to psychedelic, as well as soul-influenced garage.

The set commences with "Edge of Nowhere" by the Sunday Group. "Be Billy" is by Pat & the Californians who were a surf rock act, and members of the Surfaris appear on the track. Bud & Kathy supply the tough-talking "Hang It Out to Dry". The Last Word is featured on three tracks including the eerie and intense "Sleepy Hollow" which also appeared on Pebbles, Volume 5. "The Frog" is by Sir Frog and the Toads, and supplies the set with one of its most danceable numbers, and the rockabilly-influenced "Penicillin", is by Johnny MacRae. The Barracudas are featured on four songs, including "These Ironic Days", and the New Breed are showcased on three, including the Syndicate of Sound-influenced "I’ll Still Be Waiting There". The set concludes with "Drifty", by Craig & Michael.

== Track listing ==
1. The Sunday Group: "Edge of Nowhere" 1:54
2. Bud & Kathy: "Hang It Out to Dry" 2:24
3. Pat & the Californians: "Be Billy" 2:04
4. The Bel Cantos: "Feel Aw Right, Pt. 1" (Greg Crowner/Rex DeLong/John Kirkland/Wayne Matteson) 2:19
5. The Rumblers: "Hey Did-A-Da-Da" (Greg Crowner/Rex DeLong/John Kirkland/Wayne Matteson) 2:16
6. The Last Word: "Sleepy Hollow" 2:51
7. Sir Frog & The Toads: "The Frog" (Bob Duran) 2:20
8. Johnny MacRae: "Penicillin" (Johnny MacRae) 2:37
9. The Rumblers: "Clap Hands" (Greg Crowner/Rex DeLong/John Kirkland/Wayne Matteson) 2:22
10. The New Breed: "I Got Nothin' to Say to You" (The New Breed) 2:27
11. The Barracudas: "What I Want You to Say" (Gary Bodily) 2:21
12. The Last Word: "Don't Call Me, I'll Call You" 2:25
13. The New Breed: "The Words Ring Back" (The New Breed) 2:20
14. The Barracudas: "The Reason Why" 1:57
15. ESP Limited: "Tell Me" (Bob Duncan) 2:58
16. The New Breed: "I'll Still Be Waiting There" (The New Breed) 2:16
17. The Barracudas: "I Can't Believe You're Really Mine" 2:28
18. The Sunday Group: "Pink Grapes" (Jack Stern/Barry White) 2:11
19. The Last Word: "Jump Point and Shout" 2:15
20. Pat & the Californians: "Bad" 2:47
21. Barry White/The Bel Cantos With Barry White: "A Fool in Love" (Ike Turner) 2:34
22. The Barracudas: "These Ironic Days" 2:25
23. Kicks: "Oh My Baby" 2:11
24. Craig & Michael: "Drifty" (Brian Carman) 3:04

== Catalogue and release information ==
- It Came from the Garage! Nuggets from Southern California (Big Beat, 2007)
