= On the Sly: In Search of the Family Stone =

- Directed by: Michael Rubenstone
- Written by: Michael Rubenstone
- Produced by: Michael Rubenstone; Patrick Sheehan
- Cinematography: Jason Blalock; Jeremie Brillant; Theo Hand; Marc McCrudden
- Music by: Jeremy Mage
- Release date: January 2017 (Slamdance Film Festival)
- Country: United States
- Language: English

On the Sly: In Search of the Family Stone is a documentary about Sly Stone, his absence from the music scene, and one man's quest to find out what happened to the artist. It is directed by Michael Rubenstone.

== Background ==
The film is about a quest to find the reclusive Sly. According to a 2005 Rolling Stone article by Andrew Paine Bradbury, Michael Rubenstone, Greg Zola, and indie One-Four Productions were in their second year of their project. In a Washington Post article, in reference to Stone's absence, one of the filmmakers compared him to J. D. Salinger. Through a period of about 12 years, band members, people in the music industry and other musicians were interviewed. One of the people to appear in the film is Cornel West. He talks about Stone's biggest hit songs and the effect they had on him.

After 13 years and going through 500 hours of footage the film was completed. It appears that the final product as well as the majority of the work, and final completion is due to the efforts by Michael Rubenstone with a new production company, Unreal films.

Greg Zola who in the early period of the film's creation was Michael Rubenstone's partner, ended up completing his own documentary about Sly Stone, Small Talk About Sly.

=== Premiere ===
The film premiered at the 2017 Slamdance Film Festival.

== Cast ==
- Rusty Allen
- Frank Arellano
- Hamp 'Bubba' Banks
- Dick Cavett
- Clive Davis
- Gordon DeWitty
- Greg Errico
- David Froelich
- George Johnson
- Jeff Kaliss
- David Kapralik
- Michaell Lang
- Jerry Martini
- Alec Palao
- Stephen Paley
- Pat Rizzo
- Cynthia Robinson
- Rich Romanello
- Michael Rubenstone
- Joel Selvin
- Paul Shaffer
- Vet Stone
- Quincy Troupe
- John Turk
- Michael Wadleigh
- Cornel West
- Bobby Womack
