= She (American band) =

- Also known as: The Id, the Hairem
- Origin: Sacramento, California, United States
- Genres: Garage rock, psychedelic
- Years active: 1964-1971
- Label: Kent

She was an all-female American garage rock band from Sacramento, California that was active between 1964 and 1971. Originally called the Id, the band later changed its name to the Hairem, where its members recorded several tracks that remained unissued for many years. Though the group was known for a raw sound, as the decade passed they incorporated psychedelic influences and eventually changed their name to She. In 1970, as She, they released the single, "Boy Little Boy" b/w "Outta Reach". Since 1999, with the release of the She Wants a Piece of You compilation, the group's work has come to the attention of garage rock enthusiasts.

The group was formed in 1964 as the Id by seventeen year old guitarist and songwriter, Nancy Ross, along with her sister, Sally Ross (now Sally Ross-Moore), who was thirteen, while the two were in high school in Sacramento, California. Despite shifting lineup changes, the two sisters remained in the group's roster throughout its whole tenure. Ross-Moore recounts that she and her sister had a rebellious attitude at the time. Nancy Ross came up the idea for forming an all-female group after attending a Beach Boys' concert in 1964. According to her sister, Ross-Moore:

After one particular concert (a Beach Boys show in 1964, on a school night no less) Nancy had an experience that would change the girls’ lives forever. 'I woke up—I’d only been asleep about 15 minutes—and I’d had this clear dream, vision, whatever you want to call it, of a group of girls onstage. In my mind it was just like the Beach Boys, but girls.'

Each female member in the band played an instrument. In order to sound more appealing to potential record labels, the group changed its name to the Hairem, where they recorded several raw songs, such as "Like a Snake"—all of which remained unreleased until 1999. The Hairem played shows regularly throughout Sacramento and San Francisco. They incorporated psychedelic influences and began singing harmonies, yet retained their raw sound, eventually changing their name to "She" by the end of the 1960s. In 1970, they released a single for the Kent label, which featured an uncharacteristically pop-oriented A-side, "Boy Little Boy", backed with the more characteristically raw "Outta Reach". The group disbanded in 1971.

In the intervening years the group's work has come to the attention of garage rock enthusiasts. Most of the group's recorded material remained unissued until 1999, with the release of the anthology, She Wants a Piece of You, on Big Beat Records. The set includes all of the band's recorded work. Some of the band's tracks also appeared on the bootleg Outta Reach LP, issued by Causeway Records.

== Discography ==
- "Boy Little Boy" b/w "Outta Reach" (Kent 4525, August 1970)
- She...Wants a Piece of You! (Compilation, Big Beat records, 2016)
