= Akiko Nakamura =

Japanese singer and actress

Akiko Nakamura (Japanese: 中村晃子) is a Japanese singer and actress. Her song Nijiiro No Mizuumi (Japanese: 虹色の湖) (1967) reached number 3 on the Oricon Singles Chart.

== Discography ==
=== Singles ===
- Aoi Ochiba (Japanese: 青い落葉) (1965)
- Mujou (Japanese: 霧情) (1966)
- Watashi No Sei Ja Nai (Japanese: 私のせいじゃない) (1966)
- Watashi Wa Majoreena (Japanese: 私はマジョリーナ) (1966)
- Anata Wa Doko E (Japanese: あなたはどこへ) (1967)
- Taiyou Ni Koi Wo Shite (Japanese: 太陽に恋をして) (1967)
- Nijiiro No Mizuumi (1967) This single reached number 1 on the Cash Box local singles chart.
- Suna No Jujika (Japanese: 砂の十字架) (1968). This single reached number 21 on the Oricon chart.
- Nageki No Shinju (Japanese: なげきの真珠) (1968). This single reached number 20 on the Oricon chart.
- Namida No Mori No Monogatari (Japanese: 涙の森の物語) (1969) This single reached number 39 on the Oricon chart.
- Rome No Tomoshibi (Japanese: ローマの灯) (1969)
- Kaze To Bara No Kouya (Japanese: 風とバラの荒野) (1969)
- Itsuka Aishite (Japanese: いつか愛して) (1970)
- Ai No Shouzou (Japanese: 愛の肖像) (1970)
- Mizuumi Wa Tenshi No Namida (Japanese: 湖は天使の涙) (1970)
- Hadashi No Blues (Japanese: 裸足のブルース) (1971)
- Utsukushiki Challenger (Japanese: 美しきチャレンジャー) (1971)
- Jounetsu No Umi (Japanese: 情熱の海) (1971)
- Ryoshu-Rome (Japanese: 旅愁〜ローマ) (1971)
- Aishu No Tabi (Japanese: 哀愁の旅) (1971)
- Glass No Shiro (Japanese: ガラスの城) (1972)
- Ano Machi Wa Doko E Itta (Japanese: あの街はどこへいった) (1972)
- Kurashiki, Namida Mo Niou Machi (Japanese: 倉敷・涙も匂う町) (1972)
- Hageshii Koi (Japanese: 激しい恋) (1973)
- Bara No Sasayaki (Japanese: 薔薇の囁き) (1974)
- Koi Shigure (Japanese: 恋しぐれ) (1975)
- Tabiji (Japanese: 旅路) (1975)
- What Have They Done To My Song, Ma (Japanese: 傷ついた小鳥 (Kizutsuita Kotori)) (1976)
- Meguri Awanainoni (Japanese: めぐり逢わないのに) (1977)
- Jajauma Narashi (Japanese: じゃじゃ馬ならし) (1978)
- "Through the Eyes of Love", Theme from Ice Castles (Japanese: この愛に生きる (Kono Ai Ni Ikiru)) (1979)
- Koi No Tsunawatari (Japanese: 恋の綱わたり) (1980) This single reached number 4 on the Oricon chart, the Music Labo chart and the Cash Box of Japan chart.
- Sasayaki No Kubikazari (Japanese: ささやきの首飾り) (1981)

Duets:

- Midori No Tonbo (Japanese: みどりのとんぼ) (1972)
- Amai Sasayaki (Japanese: あまい囁き) (1973). Duet with Toshiyuki Hosokawa.
- Dakara Tango de... (Japanese: だからタンゴで… ) (1990)

=== Albums ===
- Nijiiro No Mizuumi: Akiko Nakamura Hit Album (虹色の湖: 中村晃子ヒット・アルバム) (1968). Reissued on vinyl in 1984 and in the 2020s.
- Akko Wa Utau: Akiko Nakamura Hit Album Vol. 2 (Japanese: アッコはうたう〜中村晃子ヒット・アルバム第2集〜) (1970)
- Akiko Nakamura Double Deluxe (Japanese: 中村晃子ダブル・デラックス) (1970)
- Akiko Nakamura Attack Schubert (Japanese: 中村晃子 アタックシューベルト) (1971)
- Hadashi No Blues: Akiko Nakamura Hit 14 (Japanese: 裸足のブルース〜中村晃子 ヒット14〜) (1971)
- Amai Sasayaki: Akiko Nakamura Best Album (Japanese: 「あまい囁き」〜中村晃子ベストアルバム〜) (1974)
- Akiko! Jane Birkin mitai dane (Japanese: AKIKO!－ジェーン・バーキンみたいだね－) (1977)
- Mokuyōza (Japanese: 木曜座) (1980)
- Koi-tachi Onna-tachi (Japanese: 恋たち・女たち) (1981)
- Rokku Tengoku (Japanese: ロック天国) (1998)
- Nijiiro No Mizuumi (Japanese: 虹色の湖) (2002)

== Films ==
She co-starred with The Jaguars in the film Susume! Jagazu Tekizen Joriku (Japanese: 進め!ジャガーズ 敵前上陸) (Shochiku, 1968), also called Make Way For The Jaguars. She also starred in Space Adventure Cobra: The Movie (1982). Other film roles include, in particular, Detective Story (1983).

== Television ==
She performed in the 19th NHK Kōhaku Uta Gassen (1968). She appeared on Yoru no Hit Studio. She starred in an episode of Ima Mo Tokimeki Waga Kokoro No Poppusu (Japanese: 今もトキメキ・我が心のポップス) on NHK.
