= The Beach Nuts =

American garage rock band

Background information
- Also known as: The Beech Nuts
- Origin: Point Pleasant Beach, New Jersey, United States
- Genres: Garage rock; surf rock
- Years active: 1963–1967
- Labels: Pickwick
- Past members: Keith MacGregor; Bill Ross; Clyde Snyder; John Scanlan; Lowell Stanley; Marv Gellman

The Beach Nuts (also known as The Beech Nuts) were an American garage rock band formed in Point Pleasant Beach, New Jersey, in 1963. Performing as a popular cover band in the region, the Beach Nuts recorded one single in 1966. Its A-side, "My Iconoclastic Life", has since become considered a classic composition among 1960s garage acts. Music collectors sought more information on the band, initially mistaking them for a studio group of the same name, which was led by Lou Reed of Velvet Underground fame. However, over time the Beach Nuts' true history has been discovered and the band still sporadically arranges reunion performances.

== History ==
Formed in 1963 by high school students who frequented the boardwalk, the Beach Nuts' original line-up included Keith MacGregor (lead guitar), Bill Ross (rhythm guitar), Clyde Snyder (bass guitar), and John Scanlan (drums). Beginning strictly as an instrumental troupe covering tunes by the Ventures, the group typically performed at local high schools, get-togethers, and dance clubs. In 1964, the Beach Nuts won a battle of the bands contest hosted by the Junior League, which awarded them the opportunity to perform in New Jersey's exhibit at the New York World's Fair. The band started incorporating vocals into popular material from British Invasion groups the Beatles and the Rolling Stones. Scanlan was replaced by Marv Gellman, who brought Lowell Stanley to be the Beach Nuts' lead vocalist and saxophone player. This reconfigured line-up remained unchanged for the remaining duration of the group's career.

With the acquisitions of the two new members, the band's setlist broadened and their touring expanded to venues such as the Fort Monmouth teen club and Teen Day Vue. In April 1964, MacGregor's father arranged for the Beach Nuts to appear on the television program Just for Fun, hosted by Sonny Fox. Performing surf rock instrumentals such as "Out of Limits" and "Tequila", an audio tape of the group still exists and has been bootlegged. On January 6, 1966, the group entered Gotham Studios in Manhattan to record an album composed of five renditions of popular compositions including "Hang on Sloopy", "Hi-Heel Sneakers", "Whittier Blvd", "It's Alright", and "Club a Go Go". The album was self-produced and sold at the Beach Nuts' live events.

MacGregor's father again arranged a recording session for the band, this time at Majestics Studios to record their debut single. Bassist Snyder recalls the development of the two songs for the single: "Keith, Marv and Lowell wrote the songs and Bill and I filled in our parts. We all thought that the flip side, 'Nature's Company' was the better song. We worked on that one a lot longer. We wrote and recorded that as the A-side. 'My Iconoclastic Life' was just thrown together as a filler to put on the flip; we were in shock when the record company picked it for the A-side. They also cut out Keith's killer guitar solo. The original recording is at least a minute longer with this fantastic guitar solo in the middle". It was released in February 1966 on Pickwick Records.

The Beach Nuts disbanded in 1967 when Gellman and Stanley left for college. The remaining members formed a psychedelic rock band called the Experience, recording demos, but not releasing anything during their brief existence. In 1981, the group had their first reunion. Over time, "My Iconoclastic Life" has been praised as a garage rock classic, with the comprehensive book Teen Beat Mayhem listing it as one of the greatest 1960s garage recordings. The song has been featured on the compilation albums What a Way to Die, Hang It Out to Dry!, and I Was a Teenage Caveman. As newer listeners became interested in the song, collectors sought information on the Beach Nuts. Initially, they were incorrectly associated with a studio group of the same name that included Lou Reed. Although no connection exists, it was not without foundation: the two groups a shared record label, Pickwick, which Reed worked for in the mid-1960s.

On January 16, 2016, the band reconvened for a one-time only performance at an event known as "Surfer's Garage". It included all the original members and guitarist Tyler Sherman.
