= Arlie Neaville =

American gospel singer and songwriter (1937–2023)

- Birth name: Arlie Dean Neaville
- Also known as: Dean Carter
- Born: June 11, 1937; Fairfield, Illinois, U.S.
- Died: April 24, 2023 (aged 85); Urbana, Illinois, U.S.
- Genres: Gospel; rockabilly; garage rock; soul
- Occupation(s): Singer, musician
- Instrument: Guitar
- Years active: 1960s
- Labels: Ping; Fraternity; Milky Way; Tell International

Arlie Dean Neaville (June 11, 1937 – April 24, 2023), also known as Dean Carter, was an American gospel singer and songwriter who was active in music from the early 1960s. For several years during the 1960s he recorded and performed as Dean Carter, specializing in rockabilly and soul influenced garage rock displayed in songs such as "Rebel Woman" and a version of "Jailhouse Rock", but in the early 1970s he switched to gospel.

== Biography ==
Neaville was born in Fairfield, Illinois, and began playing rockabilly in the late 1950s. He recorded under his real name on the Ping label between in 1961 and on Fraternity Records in 1962–1963. In 1964, he began to record as Dean Carter on the Limelight label, where he released the single, *"Sixteen Tones" b/w "The Lucky One". That year, he and Arlie Miller, a member of his backing band, the Lucky Ones, started a home studio in Danville, Illinois. They also ran the Milky Way label, which released music by Carter and others. There, Carter recorded a string of singles: "Number One Girl" (1965), "The Rockin Bandit" (1965) and "Run Rabbit Run" (1967), as well as the record for which he is best known, "Jailhouse Rock" b/w "Rebel Woman" in 1967. Carter's version of "Jailhouse Rock", featured the odd sounds of walkie talkie beeps, overdriven guitars, augmented with a ukulele, accordion, dobro, and clarinet.

In the late 1960s, Carter moved to the Washington State on the West Coast and recorded a couple of singles with Gene Vincent and guitarist Jerry Merritt on Merritt's Tell International label. For International, Carter released the single "Mary Sue" b/w "Wandering Soul". He returned to the Midwest at the end of the decade to resume recording with Miller, and went back to billing himself as Arlie Neaville. In the early 1970s, he switched to gospel music, which has been his style ever since. In the early-to-mid 1970s he released the singles, "Brighter Days" b/w "Don't Throw Any Stones" and "Sweet Side of Life".

In the intervening years, Neaville's music has come to the attention of music enthusiasts, particularly his recordings made in the 1960s as Dean Carter. His collected recordings as Dean Carter were issued on the Call of the Wild anthology, released in 2002 by Big Beat Records. The song "Rebel Woman" has appeared on Pebbles, Volume 6, Chicago Part 1 and Best of Pebbles, Volume One.

Arlie Neaville died at his home in Urbana, Illinois, on April 24, 2023, at the age of 85.

== Discography ==
=== As Arlie Neaville ===
- "Angel Love" b/w "River of Life" (Ping 8001, 1961)
- "Alone on a Star" b/w "Sunday Mornin'" (Tell International 45-375)
- "Drink My Wine" b/w "Tawney" (Tell International 45-378, 1969)
- "The Gospel Music Man" (LP, Fraternity Records 1025, 1973)
- "He Saved My Soul" (LP, Fraternity Records 3121 6, 1973)
- "Sweet Side of Life" b/w "In God We Trust" (Shout N Shine IRDA 143, 1975)
- "In God We Trust" (LP, Gospel Music Center Records, LPS-288-01)
- "Gospel Cannonball" b/w "How Great Thou Art" (G.M. Center – SC-285-05, 1989)
- "Indianapolis" b/w "Good Samaritan" (Shout N Shine Records, IRDA # 215)

=== As Arlie Nevil ===
- "Alone on a Star" b/w "The Skip" (Fraternity F-900, 1962)
- "Brighter Days" b/w "Don't Throw Any Stones" (Fraternity F 1202, 1973)

=== As Dean Carter ===
- "Sixteen Tones" b/w "The Lucky One" (Limelight Y-3019, 1964)
- "Number One Girl" b/w "Fever" (Milky Way MW-003, 1965)
- "The Rockin Bandit" b/w "Care" (Milky Way MW-004, 1965)
- "Run Rabbit Run" b/w "Soul Feelin'" (Milky Way MW-011, 1967)
- "Jailhouse Rock" b/w "Rebel Woman" (Milky Way MW-011, 1967)
- "Mary Sue" b/w "Wandering Soul" (Tell International 369, October 1967)
- "Good Side of My Mind" bw/ "Do I Need a Reason" (Tell International 45-373, 1968)

== See also ==
- The Midnite Sound of the Milky Way
