= Pipeline (instrumental) =

Single by Chantay's

from the album Pipeline
- B-side: "Move It"
- Released: December 1962, January 1963
- Recorded: July 1962
- Genre: Surf rock
- Length: 2:19
- Label: Downey D-104, Dot 15-16440
- Songwriters: Brian Carman, Bob Spickard

"Pipeline" is a surf rock instrumental by the Chantays (credited as "Chantay's"), which was recorded in July 1962.

== History ==
The tune, originally called "Liberty's Whip" after The Man Who Shot Liberty Valance, was renamed after the band members saw a surfing movie showing scenes of the Banzai Pipeline in Hawaii. The record, fitting in with the popular surfing craze of the time, swiftly rose up the Billboard Pop charts, reaching No. 4 and becoming a classic 1960s hit. The tune featured Alberti bass arpeggios.

Although they had myriad surf tunes, "Pipeline" was the Chantays' only hit single, and is considered one of the landmarks of the surf genre. The track's distinctive sound was largely due to the mix being "upside down" compared to typical rock and roll of the era; the bass guitar, electric piano and rhythm guitar were at the forefront, while the lead guitar and drums were less prominent. Although the 45-rpm was released only in monaural, the track was recorded in wide stereo, with the rhythm guitar hard left, the bass and drums hard right, and the electric piano and lead guitar centered. Modern reissues, beginning with the 1980 MCA Records 7" single, are stereophonic. “Pipeline” was originally written by Robert M Burns and sold to the Chantays. Robert also wrote many other surf songs of that era including "K-39."

The hit single was released in December 1962 on the label Downey, and was picked up for nationwide distribution by Dot Records as Dot 15-16440 in January 1963. Both releases spelled the band name as Chantay's.

In November 1997, the Chantays recorded a new acoustic version of the tune, entitled "Pipeline Unplugged", which was released on their album Waiting for the Tide.

The song was used as background music for the BBC's Match of the Day Goal of the Month competition. It was also used for many years during the 1980s and 1990s as the entrance music for the Edmonton Oilers ice hockey team at home games in Northlands Coliseum; "pipeline" is a pun on the oil industry.

== Chart performance ==
Chart (1963)	Peak position
Canada CHUM Chart	12
New Zealand Lever Hit Parade	6
UK Singles (Official Charts)	16
US Billboard Hot 100	4
US Billboard R&B Singles	11

== Covers ==
"Pipeline" was covered and recorded by a large number of other musicians including Johnny Thunders (whose live version plays over the closing credits of television series The Sopranos' Season 6 (Part 1) episode entitled "The Ride"), Dick Dale (with Stevie Ray Vaughan and with Jimmie Vaughan), The Eagles, The Ventures, Nokie Edwards with the Light Crust Doughboys, Takeshi Terauchi & Blue Jeans, Art Greenhaw, Incredible Bongo Band, Bad Manners, Roger Powell (an electronic version titled "Pipeline '76", included as a bonus track on reissues of his 1980 album Air Pocket), Hanoi Rocks, Hank Marvin (duet with Duane Eddy on Hank's 1992 album Into the Light), Elton Motello, Agent Orange, The Challengers, Anthrax on the album Attack of the Killer B's, Gary Hoey on the album Monster Surf, The Low Babies, The Astronauts, Assassin, Hot Butter, Bruce Johnston, Sandy Nelson, Australia's Exploding White Mice, Yugoslav 1960s band Mladi, and Les Claypool's Duo de Twang's Four Foot Shack. Stevie Ray Vaughan and Dick Dale's version was also on the soundtrack for the 1987 film, Back to the Beach, as well as their separate compilation albums.

A cover by The Ventures is prominently used in the 1992 Japanese film The Rocking Horsemen; in the plot, "Pipeline" inspires the protagonist to form a rock band with his high school classmates in Kan'onji, Kagawa during the 1960s.

In 2011, Pat Metheny released a solo acoustic guitar version of this song on his What's It All About album. In 2014 Bill Frisell released a jazz version of "Pipeline" on his Guitar in the Space Age! album.

== See also ==
- List of 1960s one-hit wonders in the United States
