= The Sting-rays =

British rock band

- Also known as: The Bananamen, The Paralyzed Purple Rays
- Origin: Crouch End, London, England
- Genres: Garage rock; garage punk; psychobilly
- Years active: 1981–1987
- Labels: Big Beat; Kaleidoscope Sound; Cherry Red
- Past members: Keith Cockburn; Alec Palao; Mark Hosking; Bal Croce; Jonny Bridgwood

The Sting-rays (often credited The Stingrays) were an English rock band from Crouch End, London who recorded on Ace Records' garage and psychedelic subsidiary Big Beat and Joe Foster's Kaleidoscope Sound in the 1980s.

== Discography ==
Most of the band's songs were written by Alec Palao and Bal Croce.

Albums

- Dinosaurs (Big Beat, 1983)
- Cryptic and Coffee Time (Kaleidoscope Sound, 1987)
- The Essential (Early) Sting-Rays (Big Beat, 1987)
- From the Kitchen Sink (Big Beat, 2002) compilation

EP's, Singles

- On Self Destruct (Big Beat, 1983) EP
- The Crusher as Bananamen (Big Beat, 1983) EP
- "Escalator" (Big Beat, 1984)
- "Don't Break Down" (Big Beat, 1985)
- June Rhyme (Kaleidoscope Sound, 1986) EP
- Behind the Beyond (Kaleidoscope Sound, 1986) EP

Live

- Stomping at the Klub Foot (1984) (with Restless, Milkshakes and Guana Batz)
- Live Retaliation (Media Burn, 1985)
- Live & Raw (Raucous, 1995)
- Live at the Klub Foot 1984 (Cherry Red, 2010)

Compilation contributions

- Blood on the Cats (Anagram, 1983)
- Revenge of the Killer Pussies (Blood on the Cats #2) (Anagram, 1984)
- Children of Nuggets: Original Artyfacts from the Second Psychedelic Era, 1976–1995 (1995)
