= Hang It Out to Dry! =

Compilation album
- Released: 1994
- Recorded: 1960s
- Genres: Garage rock; psychedelic
- Length: 1:06:20
- Label: Satan

Hang It Out to Dry! is a compilation of garage rock recordings from the 1960s first issued by Satan Records in 1994 which is available in two versions, both on LP and in extended form on CD. It features some of the more upbeat and rocking examples of the genre.

The LP features fourteen tracks and the CD is extended to twenty-seven. The first fourteen tracks on the CD are identical to those on the LP. Both formats' sets begin with "Its a Lie" by Angie and the New Raiders. The Castaways from Lake Charles, Louisiana (not to be confused with the better known group from Minneapolis–Saint Paul) are featured on two numbers, "Ain't Gonna Cheat on Me" and the brutally honest "You Were Telling Lies". Frank Ventura & The Crescents "raunchify" the Mersey beat influences displayed in "Pain". "Lily" is a moody and brooding rocker by Yuba City, California's Drusalee & the Dead, who rode in the decommissioned funeral livery customary of so many bands of the time and had printed on their business card the motto "Have Hearse, Will Travel" (a pun on Richard Berry's song, later covered by the Sonics). Bud & Kathy sing the song for which the collection is named: "Hang It Out to Dry", which features wailing harmonica couplets to augment its guitar riffs. One of the set's highlights is the High Tensions' protopunk "Poor Man", featuring the vocals of Tommy Dae.

The CD features another eleven tracks taken from a prior Satan Records compilation, What a Way to Die, beginning with the gleefully drunken screech of Detroit's Pleasure Seekers, whose ranks included a very young Suzi Quatro and her sisters in "What a Way to Die" and they also close the set with "Never Thought You'd Ever Leave Me", a moodier number embellished with elegant piano glissandos. Another highlight is the UK freakbeat raunch heard in the Renegades' 1966 rendition of Bill Haley's "Thirteen Women". Richard and the Young Lions' provide enough fuzz-caked grime to appeal to even the more ardent garage rock addicts. Another highlight is the Beach Nuts' urgently delivered "My Iconoclastic Life". The Human Beingz do the terse "Evil Hearted You".

== Track listing ==
=== LP ===
==== Side one ====
1. Angie & the New Raiders: "It's a Lie" 2:15
2. The Checkmates International: "Thinkin' About You" 2:45
3. The Riptides: "I'm in Love" 2:50
4. The Castaways: "Ain't Gonna Cheat on Me" 2:35
5. The Rovin' Flames: "I Can't" 2:08
6. Frank Ventura & the Crescents: "Pain" 3:13
7. Drusalee & the Dead: "Lily" 2:38
8. Bud & Kathy: "Hang It Out to Dry" 2:23

==== Side two ====
1. Chris Allen & the Good-Timers: "Sorry 'Bout That" 2:00
2. The Castaways: "You Were Telling Lies" 2:26
3. The Mods: "Ritual" 2:10
4. Danny Burk & The Invaders: "Ain't Goin' Nowhere" 2:25
5. The Stitches: "I'm Looking for My Baby" 2:26
6. The Living Ends: "I Don't Mind" 2:46
7. The High Tensions: "Poor Man" 2:15
8. The Indifferents: "Cindy" 2:20

=== CD ===
1. Angie and the New Raiders: "It's a Lie" (M. Walker)
2. The Checkmates International "Thinkin' About You"
3. The Riptides: "I'm in Love"
4. The Castaways: "Ain't Gonna Cheat on Me"
5. The Rovin' Flames: "I Can't" (John Brumage)
6. Frank Ventura & The Crescents: "Pain"
7. Drusalee & The Dead: "Lily"
8. Bud & Kathy: "Hang It Out To Dry"
9. Chris Allen & The Good-Timers: "Sorry 'Bout That"
10. The Castaways: "You Were Telling Lies"
11. The Mods: "Ritual"
12. Danny Burk & The Invaders: "Ain't Goin' Nowhere"
13. The Stitches: "I'm Looking for My Baby"
14. The Living Ends: "I Don't Mind"
15. The High Tensions: "Poor Man"
16. The Indifferents: "Cindy"
17. The Pleasure Seekers: "What a Way To Die"
18. Larry & The Loafers: "Let's Go to The Beach"
19. The Teddy Boys: "Don't Mess with Me"
20. The Grains of Sand: "That's When Happiness Began"
21. The Renegades: "Thirteen Women"
22. The First Four: "Empty Heart"
23. Richard and the Young Lions: "You Can Make It"
24. The Beach Nuts: "My Iconoclastic Life"
25. The Human Beingz: "Evil Hearted You"
26. The Swingin' Machine: "Do You Have to Ask?"
27. The Pleasure Seekers: "Never Thought You'd Ever Leave Me"

== Catalogue and release information ==
- LP and Compact disc (Satan 1008)
