= Planetary Pebbles (series) =

Planetary Pebbles is an extensive series of compilation albums that is a sub-series to the main Pebbles series, and was circulated through AIP Records. The complete series compiled over 80 songs of extremely rare and obscure psychedelic and garage rock musical artists from the 1960s that were previously nearly impossible to collect, even in the music artists' individual home countries. Planetary Pebbles is the third to branch out from the original series, with Best of: The Pebbles Series and Essential Pebbles series preceding it.

Among the three compilation albums to be released between 1997 and 1999 as a part of the series, there was an arrangement to specific regions. The first issue, Surfbeat Behind the Iron Curtain, Volume 1, was distributed in 1997 and featured artists east of the Iron Curtain, arguably the rarest material in any Pebbles series. It is followed by Exito A Go Go, a compilation dedicated to Latin rock. The series concludes with a return to eastern Iron Curtain bands, but with a more dedicated approach to compiling only those musical artists.

== Discography ==
- Surfbeat Behind the Iron Curtain, Volume 1 (1997)
- Planetary Pebbles, Volume 2: Exitos A Go Go (1998)
- Planetary Pebbles, Volume 3: Surfbeat Behind the Iron Curtain (1999)
