= Surfbeat Behind the Iron Curtain, Volume 1 =

Compilation album
- Released: August 12, 1997
- Recorded: 1963–1966
- Genre: Garage rock; surf rock
- Length: 1:03:02
- Label: AIP

chronology
Surfbeat Behind the Iron Curtain, Volume 1 (1997)	Planetary Pebbles, Volume 2: Exitos A Go Go (1998)

Surfbeat Behind the Iron Curtain, Volume 1 is a compilation album featuring underground garage and surf rock musical artists east of the Iron Curtain that were recorded between 1963 and 1966. It is the first installment of the Planetary Pebbles series, which was a sub-series to the Pebbles series, and was released on AIP Records, on August 12, 1997 (see 1997 in music).

Considering the Eastern European bands represented had little opportunity to record, the tracks are primitive in comparison to their Western contemporaries. Nonetheless, the album includes arguably among the rarest material available in the Pebbles series extensive catalog. Musical highlights include surf rock-inspired instrumentals by Japanese T. Terauchi, the East German Die Sputniks, and the Romanian Sincron. Other acts also resided in Czechoslovakia and Poland, with the Slava Kunst Orchestra contributing the most abnormal assortment of nonsensical lyrics, wedding band-like instrumentals, and berserk tempo on "Lucifer In Coelis".

The album claims to feature strictly groups from the Eastern Bloc, but in actuality 11 of the 24 tracks were recorded by Western European bands and a Japanese band. Surfbeat Behind the Iron Curtain, Volume 1 was released on both compact disc and vinyl.

== Track listing ==
1. Sincron: "Pe Linga Plopii Fara Sot Leader"
2. Capras: "Beginning of Autumn"
3. T. Terauchi and the Bunnys: "Theme from Unfinished Symphony"
4. Niebiesko-Czarni: "Komandosi"
5. The Eliminators: "The Saint"
6. Mefistos: "Return of Gemini"
7. Die Sputniks: "Sputniks Thema"
8. Thunderbirds: "African Guitars Leader"
9. Niebiesko-Czarni: "Nocny Alarm
10. The Boomerangs: "Crazy Guitars"
11. Trocadero Sextett: "Leicht Verdreht"
12. Orchester Charles Blackwell: "The Bumble Beat"
13. Klaus Lenz Sextett: "Corso"
14. Slava Kunst Orchestra: "Lucifer In Coelis"
15. Thunderbirds: "Twistin Safari"
16. Theo Schumann Combo: "Aladin"
17. Niebiesko-Czarni: "Take Blya Moja"
18. Sincron: "In Gara La Leordeni"
19. Gisha Brothers: "Wewo's Rock"
20. The Constellations: "Colorado"
21. Javalins: "Javalins Rock"
22. Franke Echo Quintett: "Melodie Für Barbara"
23. Eliminators: "Wipe Out!"
24. Karel Duba and His Guitar Men: "The Coach"
