= Klub Foot =

Nightclub in London, England

Coordinates: 51.492°N 0.225°W

Klub Foot was a London nightclub in the psychobilly scene of the early and mid-1980s. It started in the heyday of the psychobilly scene in 1982.

It was hosted at the Ballroom of the Clarendon Hotel in Hammersmith until the venue was demolished as part of the redevelopment of Hammersmith Town Centre. It regularly showcased the rising stars of the scene, including The Meteors, Demented Are Go, Guana Batz, Batmobile, The Sting-rays, The Caravans, Klingonz, The Highliners, Sgt Bilko's Krazy Combo and many others. On all the Klub Foot posters the address stated was "Clarendon Hotel Ballroom, Hammersmith Broadway W6". The Clarendon itself was a very large 1930s hotel with attached function rooms built in the Art Deco style, and it stood on the corner of the Hammersmith one-way system until its demolition in 1988. The Klub Foot was held in the main ballroom on the first floor, which held around 900 people.

The Klub's DJ, Hamish Macdonald, was also The Batcave DJ and John Curd's regular concert DJ for his shows in the Lyceum and the Hammersmith Palais. For each night, if the tone was rockabilly/psychobilly, the records were rockabilly/psychobilly, often referencing older sounds and more obscure artists. Hamish would also have the Better Badges stall operating at all these venues. The cheap medium of a 20p badge was a big seller in the late 70s/early 80s and Better Badges produced many different designed badges for the likes of The Meteors, Escalators, the Sting-rays, The Milkshakes, Orson Family, Sunglasses After Dark, Restless, Guana Batz, as well as for a host or rising new wave bands like New order, Southern Death Cult and the Sisters Of Mercy.

As well as hosting concerts, the Klub Foot promoter released a series of live recordings, titled Stomping At The Klubfoot on ABC records. Six volumes were released on vinyl and CD.

After the Clarendon closed, attempts were made to relocate the club at various locations including the Boston Arms in Tufnell Park, and the Town & Country Club in Kentish Town, but the dying Psychobilly scene in the UK in the 1990s made it difficult to attract crowds. Since 1999, subsequent Klub Foot Reunion concerts at the Relentless Garage in Highbury have been more successful and it is now a yearly event featuring original 1980s bands with newer support acts.
