= The Jaguars =

Japanese group sounds band

The Jaguars (Japanese: ザ・ジャガーズ) were a Japanese group sounds band.

== Members ==
Members of the band included:

- Takeshi Hameno (Japanese: 浜野たけし)
- Yukio Miya (Japanese: 宮ユキオ) (died 2013). Yukio Miya formed another band called Yukio Miya and his New Jaguars (Japanese: 宮ユキオとニュー・ジャガーズ (Miya Yukio To New Jaguars)).
- Koichi Miyazaki (Japanese: 宮崎こういち) (died 2014)
- Mikio Morida (Japanese: 森田巳木夫)
- Shin Okamoto (died 2009), lead singer
- Hisayuki Okitsu (Japanese: 沖津久幸)
- Yasuji Sato (Japanese: 佐藤安治)

== History ==
The band called Yukio Miya and the Play Five (宮ユキオとザ・プレイ・ファイブ) began in 1964.

== Discography ==
=== Singles ===
- Kimi Ni Aitai (Japanese: 君に会いたい) (1967). This single was released on 1 June 1967. It reached number 3 on the weekly Japanese internarional singles chart published in Cash Box. It reached number 9 on the weekly Sega Enterprises singles chart published in Billboard. It reached number 8 on the weekly Oricon international singles chart published in Billboard. It sold 1.2 million copies. The song was used in an Asahi Breweries commercial in the 1980s. The song on the B-side is Beat Train (Japanese: ビート・トレイン), which has English lyrics.
- Dancing Lonely Night (Japanese: ダンシング・ロンリー・ナイト) (1967). This single was released on 5 October 1967. It reached number 6 on the weekly Japanese internarional singles chart published in Cash Box on 9 December 1967. It reached number 27 on the weekly Oricon Singles Chart that officially began on 4 January 1968. The song on the B-side is Wakai Ashita (若いあした).
- Mademoiselle Blues (Japanese: マドモアゼル・ブルース) (1968). This single was released on 25 January 1968. It reached number 26 on the weekly Oricon singles chart. The song on the B-side is Awarena John (哀れなジョン).
- Xanadu No Densetsu (Japanese: キサナドゥーの伝説) (1968). This song is a cover version, with Japanese lyrics, of The Legend of Xanadu. This single was released on 15 June 1968. It reached number 20 on the weekly Oricon singles chart. The song on the other side is Futari Dake No Nagisa (二人だけの渚), which is a cover version, with Japanese lyrics, of Annie Philippe's "Quarante Maringouins" (1967).
- Hoshizora No Futari (Japanese: 星空の二人) (1968). This single was released on 25 September 1968. It reached number 58 on the weekly Oricon singles chart. The song on the B-side is Koi No Passport (恋のパスポート).
- Koibitotachi Ni Blues Wo (Japanese: 恋人たちにブルースを) (1969). The song on the B-side is Koisuru Mayumi (恋するまゆみ).
- Futari No Machikado (Japanese: 二人の街角) (1969)
- Itsuka Dareka (Japanese: いつか誰か) (1970). The song on the B-side is Phoenix [Japanese: フェニックス (不死鳥)].
- Hatsuratsu 30-sai (Japanese: はつらつ30才) (1982)

=== Albums ===
The Jaguars released the following studio albums:

- Jaguars Tai Carnabeats (Japanese: ジャガーズ対カーナビーツ) (1967), or The Jaguars meets the Carnabeats. This is a joint album with The Carnabeats. This album was re-released in 2011.
- The Jaguars' First Album (Japanese: ファースト・アルバム) (1968). This album was re-released in 1999, 2003 and 2011. First Album & More (ファースト・アルバム&モア) was released in 1992.
- Second Album (Japanese: セカンド・アルバム) (1968) This album was re-released in 1999. Second Album & More (セカンド・アルバム&モア) was released in 1992.

Compilation albums include:

- The Jaguars Monogatari (Japanese: ザ・ジャガーズ物語) (1989)
- New Best (Japanese: ニュー・ベスト) (1993)
- The Jaguars Complete Singles (2000)
- The Jaguars Super Best (2007)

== Film ==
The Jaguars co-starred with Akiko Nakamura in the film Susume! Jagazu Tekizen Joriku (Japanese: 進め!ジャガーズ 敵前上陸) (Shochiku, 1968), also called Make Way For The Jaguars. The film was released on video in 1995, on DVD in 2006 and 2007, and included in a box set in 2007.

== Reception ==
The Jaguars have been described as one of the ten main group sounds bands. Kaye said they were among the leading rock bands. Cope said they were important.
