= A History of Garage and Frat Bands in Memphis 1960–1975, Volume 1 =

Compilation album by Various artists
- Released: 2001
- Recorded: 1960–1975
- Genre: Garage rock; frat rock; soul; psychedelic
- Length: 33:25
- Label: Shangri-La Projects

Various artists chronology
A History of Garage and Frat Bands in Memphis 1960–1975, Volume 1	A History of Garage and Frat Bands in Memphis 1960–1975, Volume 2

A History of Garage and Frat Bands in Memphis 1960–1975, Volume 1 is a garage rock multi-genre compilation available on compact disc consisting of songs by various artists, recorded in the 1960s, compiled by Ron Hall, who also wrote the book for which it is named (it was released in conjunction with the book). There earliest song on the set was recorded in 1961 and the latest in 1969—there are no songs from the 1970s, but the part of the title which reads "1960–1975" is meant to mirror the title of the book, which covers acts from the entire range of years. The fifteen songs on the collection represent the diversity of Memphis garage rock, stretching from its early 1960s rock & roll roots to frat rock, "pure" garage rock, Stax soul-influenced rock, and psychedelic. According to Heather Phares of Allmusic, the album's tracks "...trace the history of the Tennessee city's underground music scene, offering enough twists and surprises along the way to make the collection worthwhile for die-hard fans of frat and garage rock from the '60s..."

The anthology begins with the frantic "Uptight Tonight" by Flash & The Casuals, headed by David "Flash" Fleishmen. The Le Sabres, named for the Buick automobile, were active in the early 1960s and recorded "Rising Mercury Twist" in 1961. Moving into the mid-1960s is the Escapades' "Tell No Lies", an archetypal garage rock song, while the Jades' "Ain't Got You" is an upbeat frat rock number. Shadden & The King Lears do the haunting ballad "All I Want Is You", which features a sadly lyrical, wailing saxophone played by stand-in musician Newell Tuggle. The surf instrumental, "Mysterians", by Jimmy Tarbutton is perhaps the strangest cut on the record, conjuring up images of outer space creatures. "Land Of Soul", by the Rapscallions is a soul-influenced tracks. The Changin' Tymes' "Blue Music Box" was recorded in 1969 and is one of the collections's psychedelic songs. The Village Sound's soul-influenced "These Windows" closes the set.

== Track listing ==
1. Flash & The Casuals: "Uptight, Tonight" 2:17
2. The LeSabres: "Rising: Mercury Twist" 2:36
3. Danny Burk & The Invaders: "Ain't Goin' No Where" 2:29
4. Joe Frank & The Knights: “Can't Find a Way” 2:26
5. The Escapades: "Tell No Lies" 2:02
6. The Rapids: Seven: "Little Numbers" 1:45
7. The Yo-Yo's: "Leaning on You” 2: 09
8. The Jades: "Ain't Got You" 2:13
9. The Coachmen: "Possibility" 1:44
10. Jimmy Tarbutton: "Mysterians" 2:09
11. The Rapscallions: "Land of Soul" 2:15
12. Shadden & The King Lears: "All I Want Is You" (Andy Goldmark) 2:28
13. The Changin' Tymes: "Blue Music Box" 2:11
14. The Castells: "Save a Chance" 2:06
15. The Village Sound: "These Windows" 2:35

== Catalogue and release information ==
- A History of Garage and Frat Bands in Memphis 1960–1975, Volume 1 (Shangri-La Projects, 2001)

== Bibliography ==
- Hall, Ron (2001). Playing for a Piece of the Door: A History of Garage & Frat Bands in Memphis 1960-1975 (1st ed.). Memphis: Sharngri-La Projects. ISBN 0-9668575-1-8.
