= Big Beat Records (British record label) =

UK record label

Big Beat Records is a British record label and import distributor owned by Ace Records, specialising in garage rock.

== Roster ==
Releases include:

- The Ace of Cups
- Big Star
- Dean Carter
- The Chocolate Watchband
- Count Five
- Creedence Clearwater Revival
- The Cramps
- The Damned
- Fifty Foot Hose
- The Flaming Stars
- Frumious Bandersnatch
- The Fugs
- Guana Batz
- Dan Hicks
- Bert Jansch
- Janie Jones & the Lash
- Larry and the Blue Notes
- Mahogany Rush
- Mighty Baby
- Thee Mighty Caesars
- Motörhead
- The Music Machine
- The Nightcrawlers
- The Rationals
- John Renbourn
- The Screaming Blue Messiahs
- She
- The Sonics
- The Sting-rays
- Strawberry Alarm Clock
- Sharon Tandy
- The Zombies

== See also ==
- Lists of record labels
