= The Zombies discography =

- Studio albums: 8
- Extended plays: 8
- Live albums: 6
- Compilation albums: 18
- Singles: 24
- Box sets: 3

The discography of English rock band the Zombies consists of eight studio albums, six live albums, over 17 compilation albums, three box sets, eights extended plays, and 24 singles. The band initially found success in the UK and US with their debut single "She's Not There". Whilst they failed to continue this success in the UK, their follow-up in the US, "Tell Her No", was also a top-ten hit, The band would go on to achieve one further top-ten hit in 1969 with "Time of the Season".

The Zombies recorded two studio albums, Begin Here and Odessey and Oracle, prior to their disbandment in December 1967. A third album was recorded in 1968 after record label CBS approached several of the former members (Rod Argent, Chris White and Hugh Grundy) to record another Zombies album. This album was scheduled for release in 1969, but was cancelled and instead was eventually released in 2000 as R.I.P.. Colin Blunstone, White and Grundy briefly reformed as the Zombies to record an album in 1989. It was initially released in a few European countries in early 1990 as The Return of the Zombies before a reconfigured version was released in the UK the following year as New World. Blunstone and Argent reunited in the 2000s and have since recorded four albums as the Zombies, with the latest, Different Game, released in 2023.

== Albums ==
=== Studio albums ===
Title	Album details	Peak chart positions		
Title	Album details	UK Indie	US	US Indie
Begin Here (UK) The Zombies (US)	Released: January 1965 (US); 9 April 1965 (UK); Label: Decca, Parrot; Formats: LP	—	39	—
Odessey and Oracle	Released: 19 April 1968; Label: CBS, Date; Formats: LP, 4-track, 8-track	—	95	—
Return of the Zombies New World	Released: February 1990; April 1991 (Note: Return of the Zombies was released in several European countries in February 1990. It was released in the UK in April 1991 as New World featuring a number of remixed and re-recorded tracks.); Label: RCA, JSE/Castle; Formats: CD, LP, MC	—	—	—
R.I.P.	Released: 25 October 2000; Label: Imperial; Formats: CD	—	—	—
As Far as I Can See...	Released: 26 April 2004; Label: Go!, Rhino; Formats: CD	—	—	—
Breathe Out, Breathe In	Released: 9 May 2011; Label: Red House; Formats: CD, digital download	41	—	—
Still Got That Hunger	Released: 9 October 2015; Label: Cherry Red, The End; Formats: CD, LP, digital download	—	—	24
Different Game	Released: 31 March 2023; Label: Cooking Vinyl; Formats: CD, LP, MC	4	—	—
"—" denotes releases that did not chart or were not released in that territory.

=== Live albums ===
Title	Album details
Live on the BBC 1965–1967	Released: 1985; Label: Rhino; Formats: LP, MC
Live at the Bloomsbury Theatre, London	Released: February 2005; Label: Red House; Formats: 2×CD
Odessey & Oracle {Revisited} – The 40th Anniversary Concert	Released: 2008; Label: Red House; Formats: 2×CD
Live in Concert at Metropolis Studios	Released: August 2012; Label: Salvo; Formats: CD, CD+DVD
Live in the UK	Released: 29 April 2013; Label: Red House; Formats: CD, digital download
Live from Studio Two	Released: September 2021; Label: Red House; Formats: CD+DVD

=== Compilation albums ===
Title	Album details	Peak chart positions
Title	Album details	UK
Early Days	Released: May 1969; Label: London; Formats: LP, MC, 4-track, 8-track	—
The World of the Zombies	Released: September 1970; Label: Decca; Formats: LP	—
Time of the Zombies	Released: November 1973; Label: Epic; Formats: 2×LP, MC	—
Rock Roots	Released: May 1976; Label: Decca; Formats: LP, MC	—
She's Not There	Released: 1981; Label: Decca; Formats: LP, MC	—
The Best and the Rest of the Zombies	Released: June 1984; Label: Back-Trac; Formats: LP, MC	—
The Zombies	Released: November 1984; Label: See for Miles; Formats: LP, MC	—
The Zombies: The Collection	Released: 1988; Label: Castle Communications; Formats: CD, 2×LP, MC	—
Greatest Hits	Released: August 1990; Label: DCC Compact Classics; Formats: CD, MC	—
The Best of the Zombies	Released: 1991; Label: Music Club; Formats: CD, MC	—
The EP Collection	Released: 12 October 1992; Label: See for Miles; Formats: CD, MC	—
Absolutely the Best	Released: July 1999; Label: Fuel 2000/Varèse Sarabande; Formats: CD	—
The Singles Collection: As & Bs 1964–1969	Released: 2000; Label: Big Beat; Formats: CD	—
The Decca Stereo Anthology	Released: November 2002; Label: Big Beat; Formats: 2×CD	—
The Zombies and Beyond	Released: 26 May 2008; Label: Universal Music TV; Formats: CD	43
Time of the Season	Released: 10 February 2017; Label: Not Bad; Formats: 2×LP	—
Greatest Hits	Released: 21 April 2017; Label: Varèse Sarabande; Formats: CD, LP	—
Oddities & Extras	Released: 12 June 2021; Label: Varèse Vintage; Formats: LP	—
"—" denotes releases that did not chart or were not released in that territory.

=== Box sets ===
Title	Album details
Zombie Heaven	Released: November 1997; Label: Big Beat; Formats: 4×CD
In the Beginning...	Released: 22 February 2019; Label: Demon; Formats: 5×LP box set
The Complete Studio Recordings	Released: 22 February 2019; Label: Varèse/Craft Recordings; Formats: 5×LP box set

== EPs ==
Title	EP details
The Zombies	Released: 29 January 1965; Label: Pye; Formats: 7"
Zombies R&B	Released: 4 October 2010; Label: Big Beat; Formats: 7"
Zombies à Go Go	Released: 4 October 2010; Label: Big Beat; Formats: 7"
At Work (N' Play)	Released: 4 October 2010; Label: Big Beat; Formats: 7"
Zombies '66	Released: 1 November 2010; Label: Big Beat; Formats: 7"
Time of the Season	Released: 1 November 2010; Label: Big Beat; Formats: 7"
Zombies on the BBC	Released: 1 November 2010; Label: Big Beat; Formats: 7"
Broadcast '66	Released: 22 April 2017; Label: Rhythm & Blues; Formats: 7"

== Singles ==
Title	Year	Peak chart positions						Certifications	Album (A-side only)
Title	Year	UK	AUS	CAN	NL	US	US Cashbox	Certifications	Album (A-side only)
"She's Not There" b/w "You Make Me Feel Good"	1964	12	11	2	—	2	1	BPI: Silver	Begin Here / The Zombies
"Leave Me Be" (Note: "Leave Me Me" was not released as a single in the US.) b/w "Woman"	1964	—	81	—	—	—	—		Non-album single
"Tell Her No" UK & AUS b/w "What More Can I Do" US & CAN b/w "Leave Me Be"	1964	42	60	6	—	6	6		The Zombies
"She's Coming Home" b/w "I Must Move"	1965	—	—	21	—	58	48		Non-album singles
"I Want You Back Again" (Note: "I Want You Back Again" was only released as a single in the US, Canada and Australia.) b/w "I Remember When I Loved Her"	1965	—	—	—	—	95	92; 122		Non-album singles
"Whenever You're Ready" b/w "I Love You"	1965	—	—	—	—	110	114		Non-album singles
"Just Out of Reach" (Note: "Just Out of Reach" was released first in the US as the A-side. The UK release several months later had the sides flipped with "Remember You" as the A-side.) b/w "Remember You"	1965	—	—	—	—	113	110		Non-album singles
"Is This the Dream" b/w "Don't Go Away"	1965	—	—	—	—	—	—		Non-album singles
"Indication" b/w "How We Were Before"	1966	—	—	—	—	—	—		Non-album singles
"Gotta Get a Hold of Myself" b/w "The Way I Feel Inside"	1966	—	—	—	—	—	—		Non-album singles
"Goin' Out of My Head" b/w "She Does Everything for Me"	1967	—	—	—	—	—	—		Non-album singles
"Friends of Mine" b/w "Beechwood Park"	1967	—	—	—	—	—	—		Odessey and Oracle
"Care of Cell 44" b/w "Maybe After He's Gone"	1967	—	—	—	—	—	—		Odessey and Oracle
"Time of the Season" UK b/w "I'll Call You Mine" US b/w "Friends of Mine"	1968	—	43	1	14	3	1	BPI: Gold; RIAA: Gold	Odessey and Oracle
"Butcher's Tale (Western Front 1914)" (Note: "Butcher's Tale (Western Front 1914)" was only released as a single in the US.) b/w "This Will Be Our Year"	1968	—	—	—	—	—	—		Odessey and Oracle
"Imagine the Swan" (Note: "Imagine the Swan" was not released in the UK but was released in the majority of other territories.) b/w "Conversation Off Floral Street"	1969	—	—	59	—	109	77		Non-album singles
"If It Don't Work Out" (Note: "If It Don't Work Out" was only released in the US, Canada and the Philippines.) b/w "Don't Cry for Me"	1969	—	—	—	—	—	—		Non-album singles
"Summertime" (Note: "Summertime" was only released as a single in the Netherlands and Belgium.) b/w "She's Not There" / "Tell Her No"	1972	—	—	—	28	—	—		Non-album singles
"New World" b/w "Moonday Morning Dance"	1990	—	—	—	—	—	—		The Return of the Zombies / New World
"Lula Lula" (Note: "Lula Lula" was only released as a single in Germany.) b/w "I Can't Be Wrong"	1990	—	—	—	—	—	—		The Return of the Zombies / New World
"In My Mind a Miracle" b/w "In My Mind a Miracle" (live)	2004	—	—	—	92	—	—		As Far as I Can See...
"Southside of the Street" b/w "As Far as I Can See"	2004	—	—	—	—	—	—		As Far as I Can See...
"I Want to Fly" (Note: "I Want to Fly" was only released as a single in the Netherlands.) b/w "She's Not There" (live)	2004	—	—	—	—	—	—		As Far as I Can See...
"Dropped Reeling & Stupid"	2023	—	—	—	—	—	—		Different Game
"—" denotes releases that did not chart or were not released in that territory.

== Contributions ==
- Bunny Lake Is Missing – An Original Soundtrack Recording (1965) (contributed tracks)
- Heather’s Song – The Trailer Park Singles {Tommy MV$ERVTI} (2016) (contributed tracks)
