= Captain Mikey =

American disc jockey and voice over announcer

- Born: Marion Elbridge Herrington; July 18, 1935; Florence, South Carolina, U.S.
- Died: November 16, 1997 (aged 62); Fremont, California, U.S.
- Occupations: Radio program director, disc jockey, voice-over actor
- Years active: ca. 1960–1997
- Spouse(s): Barbara Ann Allen (1953- ) Miss Haro; Janet Eileen Rew (1984–1997)

Marion Elbridge Herrington (July 18, 1935 – November 16, 1997) (also known as Mikel Hunter Herrington), best known as Captain Mikey (and also known by the air names Mikel Hunter, Motorcycle Mikel, Lefty, Hot Rocks Hunter, and Oil Can Harry), was an American disc jockey; voice-over actor, who was the national voice for Sears; and innovative radio program director, who "pioneered album-oriented rock formats at San Jose's KOME and Los Angeles' KMET", and was described as "one of the very best programmers in Top 40 radio as well as what we called progressive rock on FM."

In October 2007 he was inducted into the San Jose Rocks Hall of Fame, and was inducted into the Bay Area Radio Hall of Fame on October 1, 2008.

Herrington inspired the fictional characters of program director Jeff Dugan in the 1978 movie FM, and program director Andy Travis on the 1980s television sitcom WKRP in Cincinnati.

Herrington also managed and promoted a San Jose rock band People!, and produced a hit record for them, People!'s cover of the Zombies' "I Love You," which reached #14 on the Billboard charts in June 1968.

Despite popular misconceptions, he has no known connection to the "Captain Mikey" of WPNR 90.7FM at Utica College who hosted shows regularly from 1995 to 1999, and returned to those airwaves again regularly in 2012.

== Personal life ==
Captain Mikey was born on July 18, 1935, as Marion Elbridge Herrington in Florence, South Carolina, the son of Carl Elbridge Herrington (born July 27, 1900, in Carteret County, North Carolina; died November 3, 1950, in New Bern, North Carolina), a brakeman for the Atlantic & East Carolina Railroad, who was killed after being run over by a freight car in an accident at the New Bern rail yards in November 1950, and Margaret Lucile Edmondson (born April 24, 1903; died December 2, 1988, in New Bern, North Carolina), and the younger brother of Robert Carl Herrington (born January 25, 1928, in South Carolina; died June 4, 2005, in St. Augustine, Florida).

In 1953 Herrington married Barbara Ann Allen in Florence, South Carolina. They had three children: Jeffrey Allen Herrington (born December 27, 1954, in New Bern, North Carolina), Michael Craig Herrington (born June 27, 1958, in Dallas, Texas), and Tracey Diane Herrington (born April 14, 1962, in Nashville, Tennessee). His next marriage was to a Miss Haro, and they had two children: Jeremy Joseph Herrington (born October 9, 1963, in San Diego, California) and Brooke M. Herrington Killian (born May 6, 1966, in Santa Clara, California). On June 24, 1984, Herrington married Janet Eileen Rew (born December 2, 1954, in Whittier, California) in Dublin, California, with whom he had two children: Trent Elbridge Herrington, (born October 6, 1989, in Philadelphia, Pennsylvania) and Kelsey Rose Herrington (born January 25, 1993, in Vallejo, California). Captain Mikey died on November 16, 1997, of leukemia at age 62 in Fremont, California.

Herrington was described as "a handsome guy with a very ballsy voice that women loved. Michael was about five foot ten, with brown hair, and he wore round, wireless glasses like John Lennon. ... He was strikingly handsome, with big, warm blue eyes, and when he spoke, a rich, friendly person, took command."

== Career ==
=== Disc Jockey and Program Director ===
Under various names, Herrington worked as a disc jockey and later as a program director at radio stations in New Bern, North Carolina; Jackson, Mississippi; Dallas; Boston; Tucson; San Diego; Los Angeles; Phoenix; Philadelphia and even an ill-fated journey to Iran. Other stations included KLIF, Dallas Texas; KELP, El Paso, Texas; and KSRO, Santa Rosa, California.

Herrington was described as one of those "people who made the station click" in Tucson, and "a walking almanac of rock and roll".

==== San Diego ====
Herrington was working in San Diego in 1963.

==== San Jose (1966–1969) ====
Herrington was both program director and a disc jockey (as Captain Mikey) at radio station KLIV in San Jose, California from 1966 to 1969, making Top 40 KLIV (1590) the first San Jose station to beat its San Francisco competitors". Herrington positioned the station as a "surfer station", featuring the music of such musicians as The Beach Boys, Jan and Dean, and The Surfaris. Working as the nighttime DJ at KLIV, Herrington's wild antics, promotions, pranks and in-studio guests brought the small San Jose station into leadership in the competitive San Francisco Bay Area radio market during the heyday of the late 1960s—the Summer of Love era when San Francisco was a cultural center. Among his promotional activities was "providing listeners with hot dogs, buns, and soft drinks for weekend caravans over Highway 17 to the beach at Santa Cruz, and the creation of the station's mascot Norman, "a snooty surfer boy".

While working at KLIV, Herrington also managed and promoted the band People!, producing their 1968 hit I Love You and the Syndicate of Sound with their hit Little Girl. Both bands and Herrington himself are members of the San Jose Rocks! Hall of Fame.

==== Los Angeles (1969–1976) ====
Herrington was a disc jockey on the following Los Angeles radio stations: KFI, 1969; KLAC, 1970; KRLA, 1971–72; KMET, 1972–74; and KGBS, 1975–76.

===== KFI (1969) =====
By January 1969 Herrington was recruited to radio KFI in Los Angeles by Dave Moorhead, where he was on air from 6-9pm. However, Moorhead accepted a position at rival KLAC by March 1969.

===== KLAC (1970) =====
Herrington was at KLAC in 1970 during the ultraconservative "chicken rock" format, which was the antithesis of "hard rock" and a forerunner of the Mellow and Soft Rock stations of the 1970s.

===== KRLA (1971–1972) =====
After being recruited by program director Shadoe Stevens, Herrington moved to KRLA by January 1971, for the progressive rock "underground" format, where he called himself "Hot Rocks Hunter", (and later "Motorcycle Mikel"), and worked the 9.00pm to midnight shift.

===== KMET (1972–1974) =====
In late 1972 Herrington (as Mikel Hunter) became the director of operations and programming at KMET-FM in Los Angeles, and as a disc jockey (as "Motorcycle Mikel") from 7am to 11am, positions he held until at least September 1974. Herrington carried, what one might consider "the lunatics in charge of the asylum,", attitude to Los Angeles radio station KMET. During his stint as program director of KMET, "the Mighty Met," the environment was as irreverent as the music. The KMET jocks had a wall full of "nude" pictures of listeners, and the ceiling of the studio was a mural with the moon and stars on it. The 1978 film FM, written by Ezra Sacks who had worked at KMET. about Jeff Dugan, who led the resistance to corporate takeover at a fictitious radio station, was based on Herrington and his times at KMET, as was the character of program director Andy Travis on the popular 1978 sitcom WKRP in Cincinnati.

Among the on air talent Herrington recruited while program director at KMET was Dr. Demento, who moved from Pasadena station KPPC at the end of 1971, and from 1972 to 1983 he performed a four-hour live radio show, which was syndicated nationally from 1974; and freeform format pioneering disc jockey Jim Ladd, whom Herrington recruited in 1974 from rival KLOS. In 1991 Ladd released a semi-autobiographical book Radio Waves: Life and Revolution on the FM Dial, which featured his colleagues at KMET (disguised as KAOS), including Herrington. By September 1974 Herrington had been replaced by Cathy Kenyon.

==== Oakland, California ====
By September 1974 Herrington (as Mikel Hunter) was the operations director at KNEW, a radio station based in Oakland, California which had switched to a country music format in July 1974.

==== Los Angeles (1975–1976) ====
In 1975, Herrington moved to KGBS, then a country music radio station in Los Angeles. After the station changed its name to KTNQ in September 1976, and subsequently format, about Christmas 1976 Herrington left KGBS to accept a lucrative position in Iran.

==== Iran (1977) ====
Herrington, along with two other American radio personalities, Ted Anthony and Claude "Hoot" Hooten (known on air as Brad Edwards), was recommended by Billboard radio and television editor Claude Hall to work for NIRT, the "American radio station" in Tehran, Iran, during the reign of the last shah, Mohammad-Rezā Shāh Pahlavi. Recruited by Kamron Mashayekhi, the head of NIRT, who was also Washington bureau chief for Savak, Herrington served as both program director, and also as disc jockey who played heavy rock and roll from 5-10pm each day for a month from March 1977. Despite the promise of six-figure salaries and generous housing and travel allowances, "all they were promised didn't happen (their phones were bugged, etc., etc.) and they ended up having to literally escape the country". Upon his return to the US, Herrington was forced to hide out in a motel in the San Fernando Valley until Hall threatened to expose the situation in Iran in Billboard.

==== San Jose (1977–1982) ====
After his return from Iran Herrington was unemployed and advertised for work. In August 1977 Herrington returned to the San Jose area "bringing his programming sensibilities" into the emerging FM market at KOME. As program director at KOME, Herrngton, described at that time as "a decidedly non-corporate type who is, in fact, something of a throwback to the early days of FM gurus, returned the station to its free-form roots. Herrington "discarded the card catalog playlist in favor of an eclectic library including art rock, jazz, punk, new wave, and soul within a rock format framework". Herrington was responsible for making that station number one in the Bay Area market and one of the most important stations in the country. According to Don West, former KOME announcer and assistant engineer, "Mikel was the one who put this station on the map. ... Mikel was into energy. ... There were no ballsy, deep voices. Mikel would toss aside someone with a great voice for someone with a great personality." Herrington is credited with coining KOME's notorious slogan: "The KOME (cum) spot on your dial". Soon after his appointment, Herrington was responsible for recruiting Dennis Erectus out of college and to KOME. By September 1981 Herrington had increased KOME's ratings from 5 to 7.6 in the previous year with a hard-rocking AOR format. Herrington described the approach as "a sound based on 'hooks and boogie'", and promotions that appealed to listeners who "like rock'n'roll but also like craziness and a little bit of humor. So we offer them humor - a somewhat sarcastic and caustic view". At KOME Herrington "had chicken flying contests, with birds pushed out of mailboxes with a toilet plunger. On April Fool's Day he told listeners to cover up their telephone receivers because the phone company was cleaning out the lines and would be blowing dust through them. And he led his whole staff to the homes of listeners to crash their parties". Herrington promised listeners "62 minutes of commercial-free music every hour". Under Herrington, the format was free-form. According to West, "There were walls of albums in the station color-coded by genre, and each had a sheet of paper attached that indicated which cuts were permitted for airplay. On classic albums like the Who's "Who's Next," every song was on the list. "Roughly there were 5,000 songs at your fingertips at any time," West says. "Now you have stations with 300."

While at KOME, Herrington was also known on air in the mornings as "Lefty", and was responsible for creating their "Hey Lefty! What time is it?" segment, where prominent musicians (including Van Halen, Grace Slick, Hall & Oates, Ian Hunter, the Greg Kihn Band, Kip Addotta, and Chevy Chase) would ask the question that prompted the announcement of the time.

By August 1981 Herrington was promoted to operations manager at KOME. In 1982 Herrington was still working as a disc jockey (as Mikel Hunter) at KLIV, and program director at KOME, however after station owners Infinity Broadcasting Corporation tried to bring in broadcasting consultants in 1982, Herrington left KOME by November 1982 in protest. According to West, "KOME's heyday came to an end in 1982".

His voiceover career included being the national voice for Sears.

==== Philadelphia (1984–1989) ====
By November 1984 Herrington became program director at Metromedia's WIP (610 AM) in Philadelphia, Pennsylvania, which was then an Adult Contemporary station, with declining ratings. During his tenure, WIP transitioned initially toward light talk and music in the evening to become primarily a sports talk station.

==== Las Vegas, Nevada ====
Herrington operated Mikel Hunter Broadcast Services, a radio programming consulting company from Las Vegas.

==== Napa, California ====
A wine connoisseur, Herrington moved to the wine country, and hosted talk shows at KVON and KVYN in Napa, California. At KVYN Herrington was program director until his resignation in September 1992.

==== Santa Rosa, California ====
Herrington's last position in radio was as host of a talk show at KSRO in Santa Rosa, California.

== Postmortem developments ==
In 2008, he was inducted into the Bay Area Radio Hall of Fame.
