= Time of the Zombies =

1973 compilation album by The Zombies

Compilation album by The Zombies
- Released: 1973 (UK); 1974 (US)
- Recorded: June 1964 – December 1968
- Label: Epic

The Zombies UK chronology
Odessey and Oracle (1968)	Time of the Zombies (1973)	New World (1991)

The Zombies US chronology
Early Days (1969)	Time of the Zombies (1974)	The Best and the Rest of the Zombies (1984)

Time of the Zombies was a two-LP compilation album of music by the British band The Zombies, released in 1973 in the UK and 1974 in the US. Side 1 features tracks preceding their April 1968 album Odessey and Oracle, side 2 features new tracks recorded by a modified lineup of the group in late 1968 as well as outtakes from 1964-66 also overdubbed in late 1968 for a planned last album named R.I.P., which was not released until 2000 (some of these were unreleased at the time, while some had previously appeared as 1969 US-only single A or B-sides), and sides 3 and 4 are the whole of Odessey and Oracle. It was released on Epic Records several years after the group had disbanded.

Paul Weller stated in an interview with BBC Radio 4 in December 2012 that this compilation was how he first heard Odessey and Oracle, his favourite album of all time.

== Track listing ==
Side one
No.	Title	Writer(s)	Original release	Length
1.	"She's Not There"	Rod Argent	Begin Here	2:23
2.	"Tell Her No"	Argent	1964 non-album single	2:04
3.	"Whenever You're Ready"	Argent	1965 non-album single	2:41
4.	"Is This the Dream"	Argent	1965 non-album single	2:43
5.	"Summertime"	DuBose Hayward, George & Ira Gershwin	Begin Here	2:16
6.	"I Love You"	Chris White	B-side of "Whenever You're Ready"	3:21
7.	"You Make Me Feel Good"	White	B-side of "She's Not There"	2:39
8.	"She's Coming Home"	Argent	1965 non-album single	2:38

Side two
No.	Title	Writer(s)	Original release	Length
9.	"She Loves The Way They Love Her"	White, Argent	previously unreleased, intended for R.I.P.	3:02
10.	"Imagine The Swan"	White, Argent	1969 non-album single, intended for R.I.P.	3:10
11.	"Smokey Day"	White, Argent	previously unreleased, intended for R.I.P.	2:25
12.	"If It Don't Work Out"	Argent	1969 non-album single, intended for R.I.P.	2:27
13.	"I Know She Will"	White	previously unreleased, intended for R.I.P.	2:35
14.	"Don't Cry for Me"	White	B-side of "If It Don't Work Out", intended for R.I.P.	2:14
15.	"Walking in the Sun"	Argent	previously unreleased, intended for R.I.P.	2:38
16.	"I'll Call You Mine"	White	B-side of "Time of the Season", intended for R.I.P.	2:54

Side three
No.	Title	Writer(s)	Original release	Length
1.	"Care of Cell 44"	Argent	Odessey & Oracle	3:54
2.	"A Rose for Emily"	Argent	Odessey & Oracle	2:17
3.	"Maybe After He's Gone"	White	Odessey & Oracle	2:43
4.	"Beechwood Park"	White	Odessey & Oracle	2:27
5.	"Brief Candles"	White	Odessey & Oracle	3:10
6.	"Hung Up On a Dream"	Argent	Odessey & Oracle	3:01

Side four
No.	Title	Writer(s)	Original release	Length
7.	"Changes"	White	Odessey & Oracle	3:02
8.	"I Want Her, She Wants Me"	Argent	Odessey & Oracle	2:48
9.	"This Will Be Our Year"	White	Odessey & Oracle	2:06
10.	"Butcher's Tale (Western Front 1914)"	White	Odessey & Oracle	2:47
11.	"Friends of Mine"	White	Odessey & Oracle	2:15
12.	"Time of the Season"	Argent	Odessey & Oracle	3:30
