= I Must Move =

1965 song by the Zombies

- US single label

Single by the Zombies
- A-side: "She's Coming Home"
- Released: 27 March 1965
- Recorded: 2 March 1965
- Studio: Decca, London
- Genre: Beat; progressive pop
- Length: 1:57
- Label: Parrot
- Songwriter: Chris White
- Producer: Ken Jones

The Zombies UK singles chronology
"Tell Her No" (1965)	"She's Coming Home" / "I Must Move" (1965)	"Whenever You're Ready" (1965)

The Zombies US singles chronology
"Tell Her No" (1964)	"She's Coming Home" / "I Must Move" (1965)	"I Want You Back Again" (1965)

Licensed audio
- "I Must Move" on YouTube

"I Must Move" is a song written by bassist Chris White and first recorded by his band the Zombies. The song was taped on 2 March 1965 at Decca Studios with Ken Jones producing. Musically, "I Must Move" shifts between major and minor keys, and has been considered experimental, with heavily reverbated guitar opening drawing influences from Eastern music. It is a Merseybeat-styled ballad featuring vocal harmonies. Lyrically, "I Must Move" tells the tale of a narrator who tells his partner he cannot stay in their relationship from an apologetic perspective.

Parrot Records initially released "I Must Move" as the B-side of the Rod Argent-composition "She's Coming Home" on 27 March 1965, with a British release of the single occurring on 9 April through Decca Records, and was also promoted on BBC Radio. It was first included on the compilation album Early Days, released by London Recordings in the US on 2 June 1969. In the UK, it remained unreleased on an album until 1984. Upon release, the song received positive reviews and was seen as more commercial than the A-side. Retrospective assessment has seen it as one of Chris White's best songs for the Zombies.

== Recording and composition ==
In the middle of their first UK tour since August 1964, the Zombies found time to record for the first time since December 1964. Entering Decca Studios in West Hampstead, London, the band taped keyboardist Rod Argent's "I Want You Back Again", "She's Coming Home", vocalist Colin Blunstone's "Just Out of Reach" and bass guitarist Chris White's "I Must Move". The songs were produced by Ken Jones, with Gus Dudgeon handling engineering. "I Must Move" was attempted in 11 takes, with the final becoming the song's master. The song's working title was "I Believe in You", which is what it is labelled as on the tape box.

"I Must Move" was originally entitled "I Believe In You", but had its title changed when White rewrote the song's lyrics to correspond to the melody better. Musically, writer Alec Palao refers to it as a song continuing "his [White's] dolefully dejected mode, with Claes Johansen adding that the chord progression is "super dense" with shifts between major and minor key. Several critics have noted the song as experimental; biographer Emma Stott wrote that the song began with a "sweet-folky melody" that shifted into a chorus "fattened by a hint of Indian drone that had a "shiver" of the Kinks contemporary single "See My Friends" (1965). The song opens with striking chords of a heavily reverbated guitar, something that the Trouser Press's Peter Olafson wrote was a Eastern-influenced intro that led into a "Merseyesque ballad" with highlighted vocal harmonies in the style of the Beatles' "This Boy".

Lyrically, "I Must Move" tells of a narrator who decides to run away from his partner. Stott felt that the lyrics were fairly evident from its title, in that the narrator regrets he cannot stay in the relationship, and has to run instead. According to Johansen, "I Must Move" builds on the "Lone Ranger"-theme, despite there being little in the way of a Wild West-hero about him. Instead, the declaration of his inability to stay with his girlfriend is "soft-spoken" and apologetic". Though Stott felt that the lyrical premises were not the "most original", the arrangement helped compensate; she believed the use of a seventh chord when Blunstone sings "And I can't stand still" lends to a "sense of uncertainty".

== Releases ==
"I Must Move" was first released only three weeks after being recorded, when Parrot Records issued it as the B-side of the Argent-penned "She's Coming Home" on 27 March 1965. (Note: Catalogue number Parrot 45 PAR 9747.) In the UK, Decca Records released the single two weeks later, on 9 April 1965. (Note: Catalogue number Decca F.12125.) "She's Coming Home" peaked at number 58 on the Billboard Hot 100 in the US, whereas neither side of the single managed to make "any impact on home audiences" in Britain. According to Palao, the original mono mix of "I Must Move" had a "reverberating production" that complemented the "churchy feel" of the A-side. Olafson suggests that "I Must Move" should have been issued as the A-side, but opined it ended up as part of the Zombies ongoing dilemma of "what was commercial and what wasn’t". The Zombies recorded a version of "I Must Move" for BBC Radio's Saturday Club on 20 April 1965, which broadcast on 1 May.

In the UK, "I Must Move" was released on the same day as the Zombies British debut album Begin Here, but was not included on it. Instead, it remained unreleased on an album in the UK until it appeared on the See for Miles Records compilation The Zombies, first issued on 3 November 1984. (Note: Catalogue number See For Miles SEE 30.) Its inclusion on a US album was earlier and first occurred on 2 June 1969, when London Recordings issued it as part of the cash-grab compilation Early Days. (Note: Catalogue number London PS 557.) On that album, it received its first stereo mix. An alternate stereo version was included on Big Beat Records' The Decca Stereo Anthology, issued on 4 November 2002. (Note: Catalogue number Big Beat CDWIK2 225.) Big Beat also included it on their career-spanning box set Zombie Heaven, issued on 8 December 1997. (Note: Catalogue number ZOMBOX 7.)

== Critical reception ==
Writing for the New Musical Express, journalist Derek Johnson felt that "I Must Move" was an "appealing rockaballad" that had an "irresistable lilt", believing it was "a bit like the Animals". The staff reviewer for Cash Box wrote that the song was a "first-rate newie" that was a "hauntingly pretty" medium-paced "sweet'n'sour romantic weeper" about a guy who "decides to play" multiple fields instead of "sticking to one gal". Dorset Echo's staff reviewer wrote that the song was attractive, and believed its inclusion on the B-side to make the single a "double-sided success". Mick Pryce of the Worcester News felt that "I Must Move" was "far more commercial" than "She's Coming Home", referring to it as a "smoothly lilting beat ballad" that featured a "most effective humming passage in the middle".

Journalist Spencer Leigh wrote that the song was highly melodic and highlighted their "close vocal harmony skills". Musician Metal Mike Saunders felt that "I Must Move" was a "good Chris White ballad". Writer Ken Barnes characterized "Don't Go Away" and "I Must Move" as archetypical Chris White songs; "sad, melodic, sung in a feathery melancholic tone by Blunstone". Stott wrote that the song featured "an interesting new sound" from Chris White. Biographer Greg Russo wrote that "I Must Move" was "another down song" which had a mood that was "easily forgotten when the band’s harmony vocals carry things along". He particularly praised drummer Hugh Grundy's subtle performance on the track, writing that he did not have to "smash away to make his presence felt". According to Palao, "I Must Move" represented one of Chris White's strongest songs from the period.

For Olafson, "I Must Move" represented a "off-the-wall pieces of progressive pop", and believed it represented a "prime example" of Chris White's songwriting genius. Music critic Richie Unterberger noted it as a "gem" and as one of the Zombies' very best B-sides, and wrote that it was one of his best works for the Zombies. "I Must Move" had an impact on garage rock; Phoenix-based rock band Phil & the Frantics reworked the song as "I Must Run", and this version was included on the cult compilation Pebbles, Volume 2 in 1979. For Unterberger, it represented the band's most memorable recording.

== Sources ==
- Johansen, Claes (2001). The Zombies - Hung Up on a Dream: A Biography 1962-1967. United Kingdom: SAF. ISBN 0 946719 34 9.
- Leigh, Spencer (1988). The Singles A's & B's (CD liner notes). United Kingdom: See for Miles. SEE CD 30.
- Palao, Alec (1997). Zombie Heaven (Box set liner notes). United Kingdom: Big Beat. ZOMBOX 7.
- Palao, Alec (2002). The Decca Stereo Anthology (CD liner notes). United Kingdom: Big Beat. CDWIK2 225.
- Russo, Greg (2016). Time Of The Season: The Zombies Collector's Guide (4th ed.). United States: CrossFire. ISBN 978-0-9791845-9-8.
- Stott, Emma (2025). The Zombies: Every Album, Every Song. United States: SonicBond. ISBN 978-1-7895249-3-2.
