= I Love You (The Zombies song) =

1965 song

- Italian single sleeve

Single by The Zombies
- A-side: "Whenever You're Ready"
- Released: 3 September 1965
- Recorded: 8 July 1965
- Studio: Decca, London
- Genre: Beat
- Length: 3:22 (UK); 3:12 (US)
- Label: Decca
- Songwriter: Chris White
- Producer: Ken Jones

The Zombies UK singles chronology
| "She's Coming Home" (1965) | "Whenever You're Ready" / "I Love You" (1965) | "Is This the Dream" (1965) |

The Zombies US singles chronology
| "I Want You Back Again" (1965) | "Whenever You're Ready" / "I Love You" (1965) | "Just Out Of Reach" (1965) |

The Zombies UK singles chronology
| "Time Of The Season" (1968) | "I Love You" (1968) |

"I Love You" is a 1965 song by the Zombies, written by their bassist Chris White. Written during a tour of France, the song was written at a time the Zombies' mainstream popularity was slowly fading. The song was released as the B-side of Rod Argent's "Whenever You're Ready" to both commercial and critical indifference.

The track got a resurgence in Japan two years after initially being recorded, when a cover in Japanese by the Carnabeats reached number two on the charts there, with it becoming a rock standard among Japanese bands. Similarly, in 1968, American rock group People! managed to reach number 14 on the Billboard Hot 100 with it.

== Background ==
"I Love You" was written by bass guitarist Chris White, during a tour of France with his group The Zombies. According to White, the process of writing the song was rather simple: "The thing that came first was the riff. That was the root of writing that one. In actual fact I think I nicked it off Tommy Roe". The song was written during the same time as several other White and Rod Argent compositions, as they were preparing a recording session upon their return to the United Kingdom and therefore needed material. White wrote the song on an acoustic guitar as opposed to a bass guitar which was his primary instrument.

The group soon returned from France, and on 8 July 1965, the group entered Decca Studios in London in order to record "I Love You" along with several other compositions. The song contrasted to the usual way of Zombies recordings; the group would usually perform several takes of one song and add overdubs to the one which was the best. On "I Love You", however, the group recorded the verses and choruses first, before a studio engineer spliced one of the verses onto the beginning, effectively becoming the first song by the group to utilize tape splicing, which would become much more common for the group later on.

== Release and reception ==
The song stayed in the vaults of Decca Records while the group embarked on their second United States tour in mid-July. Upon return however, the song was finally released on 3 September 1965, when it was issued as the B-side of the group's sixth single, "Whenever You're Ready", which had been recorded a few weeks before "I Love You". To the surprise and disappointment of the group, the single failed to reach the Record Retailer (later UK Singles Chart) chart. According to Paul Atkinson, their guitarist, they thought that the song would become a huge hit, and "lost a lot of heart" when it didn't. Following the success of People!'s version, the Zombies original was re-released long after their contract with Decca had expired. This release swapped the A-side and B-sides in order to promote "I Love You". The song once again failed to chart.

The single was relatively well received upon release. According to Derek Johnson of New Musical Express, "I Love You" had a "more fortright approach" than the A-side, noting both the harmony vocals and organ. He negatively noted the "unoriginal" title but closed with stating it to be a "most competent 'B' side." Retrospectively, Daniel Williams writes: "Perhaps, as happened to sixties groups desperately looking to rediscover a magic formula, some fatal hesitancy was exhibited about which side of a single was which; ‘I Love You’'s structural inversion of chorus and verse makes it both a dramatic and memorably harmonic B side, trumping ‘Whenever You’re Ready’'s more traditional delights and wig-out organ". Hal Horowitz believed that the song was good enough to become a hit. "I Love You" proved to be successful in the Philippines, upon which the group sold out 10 concerts at the Araneta Coliseum in Cubao, near Manila, in March 1967.

The song would not appear on an album in the US or UK for several years. However, in 1966, the song appeared on an unnamed compilation album in Sweden, which eventually would become known as I Love You. The now famous album cover shows the band standing in a high-school sports hall in the Stockholm suburb of Solna. This album has later been considered to be more of a studio album due to it containing hard-to-get releases not commonly found on albums. It has on several occasions been re-issued, most recently in 2020. "I Love You" was first issued in the US four years after its initial release, on a compilation album titled Early Days, which compiled several early recordings by the group. The song would not get a release on an album in the UK until 1973, when it was issued on Time Of The Zombies in 1974, which compiled all their 1964–66 recordings.

== People! version ==
"I Love You"

Single by People!
- A-side: "Somebody Tell Me My Name"
- Released: 6 January 1968
- Recorded: 1967
- Genre: Psychedelic rock
- Length: 4:35
- Label: Capitol
- Songwriter: Chris White
- Producer: Captain Mikey

People! singles chronology
| "Organ Grinder" (1967) | "I Love You" (1968) | "Apple Cider" (1968) |

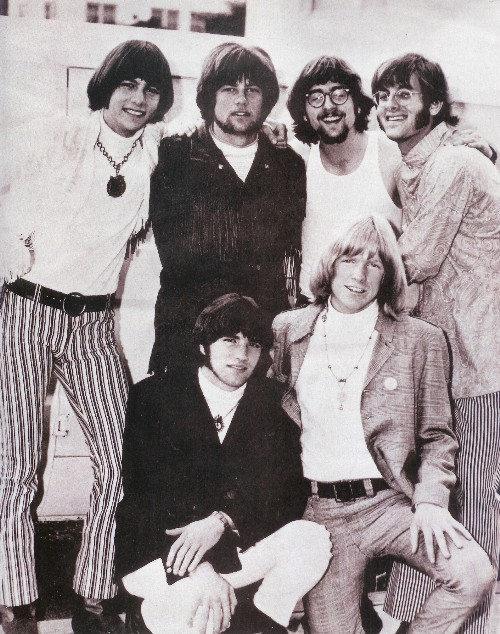
People! 1968 Back Row: (l to r) Robb Levin, Denny Fridkin, Al Ribisi, Geoff Levin; Front Row: Gene Mason and Larry Norman

In 1967, American sextet People! recorded "I Love You" and released it as their second single on 6 January 1968. It was the group's only major hit on the Billboard Hot 100, reaching number 14 on 22 June of that year. The reason for the group not having any further hits has never been established, however, a theory has been proposed:

"It was No.1 in Japan. It was big everywhere. Israel, South Africa, England, Scandinavia, Argentina and America where it actually hit No.1 in every 'market' all over the country, but not in the same week. Bill Gavin and Bill Drake had two competitive companies who did exactly the same thing. For an expensive membership each would advise radio stations on what was bubbling up and was going to be a popular release to put into rotation on the radio playlist. But People! was produced by Mikel Hunter, an upstart who broke all the rules of AM Boss Jock Radio and could predict much more accurately what was going to be a hit. So any radio programmer could take a look at Hunter's playlist, several weeks ahead of the nation, and pick the hits for free. Gavin and Drake decided to bury Hunter and one way was to advise programmers NOT to play "I Love You." "It's not going to be a hit." was their steady message for the four months during which "I Love You" fought its way to the top of every chart. A sad story. But a funny one, because People! was able to do a concert in every city while their single was the hottest thing on the local charts. Most bands can only do concerts for a week as their song hits No.1 and then is pushed off the charts by a Beatles song, or even a Monkees song. So People! followed the path that the song laid down and had the biggest and longest thrill ride any band can have. It was a freakish phenomenon and one that never happened again. The suppression and blackball attempts of Gavin and Drake spun the band into the majors and the band toured with The Who and would have kept on going. But Larry [Norman] left the band on the day when Capitol followed up the little hit that could with a revamped version of the album for its premier release. Had the song been left on its own, unopposed, it would have sat atop the national charts at #1 for several weeks according to the overall tally in the end. Had Larry stayed in the group, who knows what might have happened".

After the release of "I Love You", People! toured extensively, appearing three times on Dick Clark's American Bandstand, and also on Johnny Carson's The Tonight Show. Billboard ranked People!'s version as No.53 in their top 100 songs for 1968, while it was ranked #75 in the Cashbox annual charts. The success of People!'s version of "I Love You" frustrated The Zombies. According to Zombies member Colin Blunstone: "That was a bit of a heartbreaker. It wasn't a favourite song of mine to be absolutely honest, but it was a little disappointing that we were struggling so hard".

In July 1968 "I Love You" was included on People!'s debut album also named I Love You, which was released worldwide Despite the success of the "I Love You" single, People!'s heavy touring schedule, a promotional film of the group performing the song which aired on American Bandstand, and despite favorable reviews, the subsequent album, which was named after their hit single, was released by 13 July 1968, but only reached No.138 on the Billboard album charts on 10 August 1968.

== The Carnabeats version ==
"Sukisa Sukisa Sukisa (好きさ好きさ好きさ)"

Single by The Carnabeats
- B-side: "口笛天国" ("I Was Kaiser Bill's Batman")
- Released: June 1967
- Label: Philips
- Songwriter: Chris White

The song was translated into Japanese by Kenji Sazanami as "Sukisa Sukisa Sukisa" (好きさ好きさ好きさ) and recorded by Tokyo band the Carnabeats (ザ・カーナビーツ), a Japanese Group Sounds band, with 16-year-old drummer Ai Takano singing the lead vocal. On 1 June 1967 the single was released in Japan by Philips Records, backed with a cover of "I Was Kaiser Bill's Batman (口笛天国)". The single debuted at #7 in the local charts in September 1967, before peaking at #2 on 4 November 1967. The single reached number 1 on the international chart published in Cash Box. "Sukisa Sukisa Sukisa", the band's first and biggest hit, was included on their debut album Carnabeats First Album, which was released in 1968, and re-released in 2003 by Teichiku Records. After several more singles, and their only album, The Carnabeats disbanded in the Fall of 1969.

The success of The Carnabeats' Japanese version of "I Love You" in Japan, resulted in the original version by The Zombies being released in Japan, where it was a best-selling hit and was ranked #8 for the year of 1967.

The 1991 cover version of the Carnabeats' "Sukisa Sukisa Sukisa" by Mi-Ke reached number 9 on the Oricon Singles Chart. This version includes vocals by Ai Takano.
