= Zoe Vrakatitsis =

Zoe Vrakatitsis (July 18, 1919 – June 3, 2010) was a manager, bookkeeper, and state legislator in the U.S. state of New Hampshire.

== Biography ==
She lived in Keene where she graduated from Dresser Business School, and attended Utica College, part of Syracuse University. She was a member of the Greek Orthodox Church. She served on Keene's city council. Margaret A. Lynch defeated her in the 1978 general election.
