= KOME =

- San Jose, California; United States
- Frequency: 98.5 MHz

Programming
- Format: Rock

History
- Former call signs: KRPM (1959–1971); KOME (1971–1998)

KOME was a commercial FM radio station in San Jose, California, broadcasting at 98.5 MHz. KOME was on the air from 1971 through 1998. Currently, the 98.5 FM frequency is home to KUFX "K-Fox", a classic rock station.

An unrelated FM station in Tolar, Texas, airing a classic hits radio format in the western section of the Dallas–Fort Worth metroplex, currently uses the KOME call sign. It broadcasts on 95.5 MHz, and is owned by Chisholm Trail Communications.

== History ==
=== KRPM ===
On July 1, 1959, the station first signed on the air. It was owned by Edward W. Meece, one of the founders of Pacifica Radio. Meece formed The Audio House, Inc., and got the Federal Communications Commission to issue a construction permit for the radio station to be built.

KRPM's original format was classical music. It was only powered at 3,300 watts, so its signal was only available in and around San Jose.

=== Free-form KOME ===
Meece sold The Audio House, Inc, with KRPM, for roughly $300,000 in February 1971 to Mel Gollub of Pennsylvania and Ron Cutler. The station's call letters were changed to KOME, and the format became free-form rock.

The station allowed its disc jockeys to choose their music from a vast and diverse library of rock, jazz, blues and R&B vinyl albums. Music sets were often themed. The emphasis at KOME from 1971 to 1974 was on each DJ having a show with its own music personality.

KOME first originated from studios in the Pruneyard Shopping Center in Campbell in the Towers building on the 13th floor. Later, KOME moved to an old house on The Alameda in San Jose. Radio veteran, Bob Simmons became their Program Director in 1972 and remained for a year, taking charge of the jocks and designing the iconic black and yellow diamond KOME sticker. DJs from 1971 to 1975 included Cese McGowan, Uncle Jack Tossman, Gary T., Phil Charles, Michael "Mother" Deal, Wolf (Rick Ricketts), Wapaho Joe (Amadeo), Joe Kelly, Dick Baribou, Captain Reif/Jim Reifschneider, Mark Sherry, Victor Boc, J. William Weed and The Lobster (Paul Wells). The DJs each had their own personalities while on the air. Cese was laid back and was quite eclectic with an emphasis on folk music. Uncle Jack was a Beatles, Moody Blues and Crosby, Stills, Nash & Young fan with an engaging personality. Mother Deal was a prankster on the air, a straight-ahead rocker who loved novelty songs like "My Ding-a-Ling." And Wolf (Ricky Ricketts) was serious about constructing engaging sets and segues. He would regularly come up with songs the listeners never heard before, styles they hadn't heard before, and types of music one may have never considered before. Lobster, Joe Kelly, and Wapaho Joe were progressive rock guys who enjoyed playing Nektar, Genesis (band) and Robin Trower but all could easily stretch out to fusion of any kind, especially jazz-rock fusion artists such as Jeff Beck.

=== Moving toward playlists ===
In 1973, Cliff Feldman was put in charge of the jocks and format as KOME's Program Director. In 1974, KOME management appointed a new program director, Ed Romig from ABC owned rock station WDAI-FM in Chicago (now WLS-FM). As other progressive stations were moving toward more researched rock playlists, Romig ended the free-form format, mandating the use of index cards with specific songs to be played. This became a time of transition from progressive radio disc-jockeys whose shows had music personalities to be replaced by air personalities and strict music formats.

Romig brought in Peter B. Collins from Chicago, and hired Jona Denz, Dana Jang, and Gene Mitchell. In August 1977, Mikel Herrington (previously known as "Captain Mikey") was made Program Director and discarded the card catalog playlist in favor of allowing jocks to select "playable" tracks from an eclectic library of art rock, punk, new wave, country rock, heavy metal, oldies, and comedy. Local bands such as Hush and Cornell Hurd often got airplay. Herrington hosted the morning show and hired Barry Corkery, Dennis Erectus, Laurie Roberts, Mark Goldberg, Kelly Cox, Larry Jacobs, Greg McClure and Joe Regelski.

KOME attracted a loyal South Bay rock audience throughout the 1970s, 1980s, and early 1990s, against original San Jose FM rock rival 92.3 KSJO. Both stations managed to also serve listeners in the larger neighboring San Francisco radio market, against well-known progressive rock leader 94.9 KSAN (now KYLD), programmed by Tom Donohue.

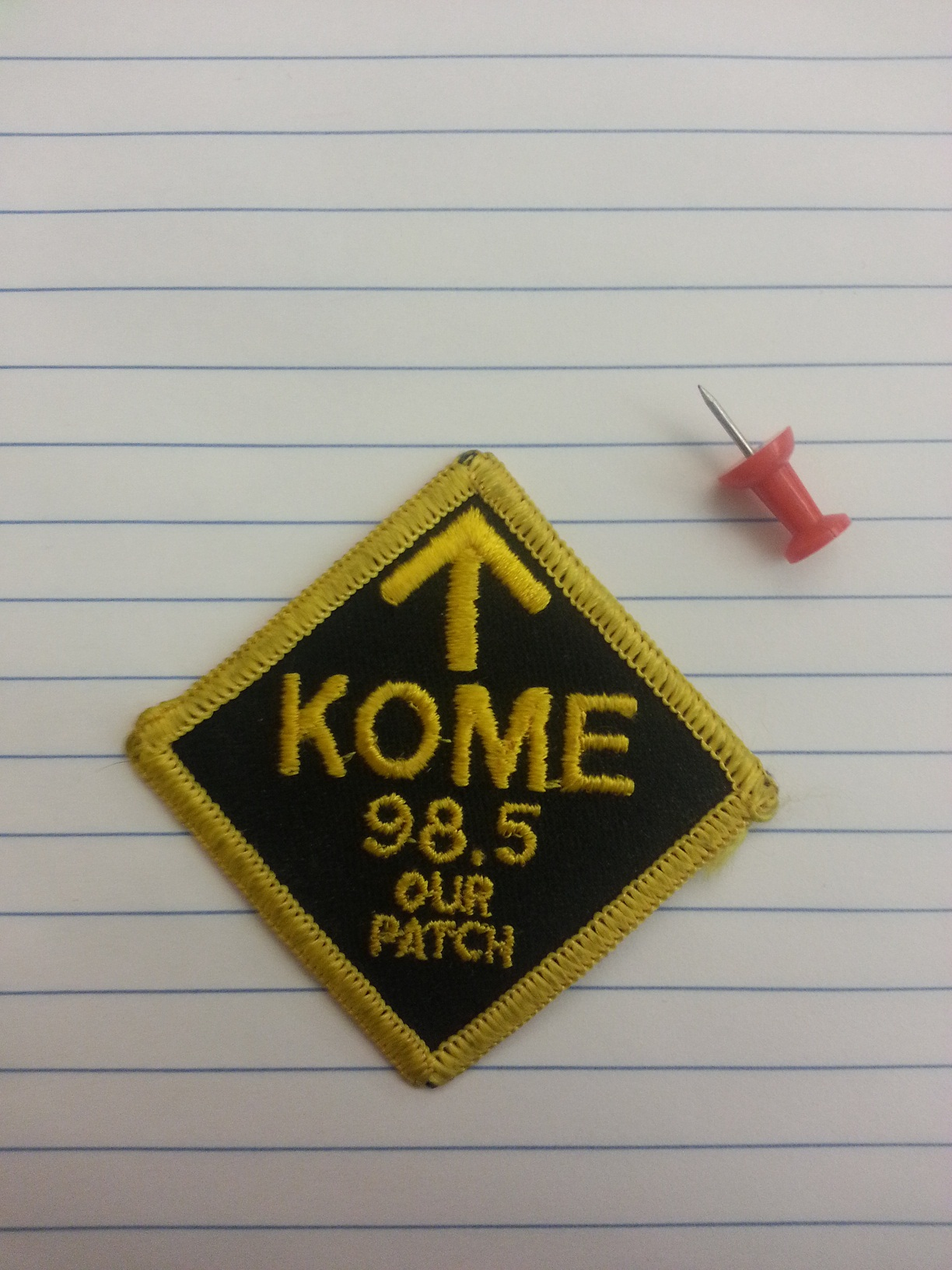
One of the yellow-on-black editions of the patch, with pushpin for size comparison.

=== Slogans and logos ===
KOME's stickers were a common sight on vehicles and high school lockers around the area. Several on-air slogans suggested the sexual connotations of its call letters, probably the most memorable being "Don't touch that dial, it's got "KOME" on it!" as well as others saying things like "K-O-M-E all over your radio dial," "You've got KOME... oozing out of your speakers," "Wake up with KOME in your ear," and "The KOME spot on your radio dial." Playboy magazine found this newsworthy enough to mention the station.

KOME black-on-yellow diamond stickers were designed in 1972 and became an instant hit. For a short time in 1974, a round zig-zaggy design was tried, but was retired quickly. As an alternative, the diamond was brought back with reverse colors. The famous KOME diamond stickers have been spotted all around the world. Listeners soon became highly creative, cutting up the decals to spell new phrases. The "Our Decal" slogan on the stickers lent itself to other "KOME Paraphernalia", such as pinbacks, patches, nightlights, glasses, T-shirts, and even the payroll checks said "Our Checks" on them. The later "Rock Radio" era eliminated the "Our Decal" and replaced it with "FM", as well as producing some with a digital typeface. Both eras produced limited edition decals promoting bands of the day, such as The Rolling Stones, The Who and Bruce Springsteen.

=== Changing ownership ===
In 1973 a group of New Yorkers led by former Metromedia executives Michael A. Wiener and Gerald Carrus, who later named their company Infinity Broadcasting, acquired KOME as the first of numerous FM rock acquisitions, which soon would include WIVY in Jacksonville, Florida in 1977 and WBCN in Boston in 1979. They moved the studios to a location on Winchester Boulevard near Payne Avenue in San Jose in early 1974.

=== Newscasts ===
News on KOME was taken seriously, but room was allowed to expand to clever parodies of news events of the day. Early reporters included Lynn Ryder and Victor Boc, who also hosted The Expressway talk show on Sunday mornings. Victor became well known for his interviews with over-the-top guests like "Squeaky" Fromme, Sylvia Browne, Mae Brussel, and "The Two".

In the early 1980s, news often turned hilarious as current events were transformed into skits that rivaled those of popular comedy troupe, The Credibility Gap The Credibility Gap through the efforts of Production Director Jack Perry and News staffers Rob Singleton, Joe Regelski, and Mark Goldberg.

In the latter years, the morning team of Blazy and Bob integrated news into mornings, since Bob Lilley was both reporter and side-kick.

=== 1980s–1990s ===
KOME's reputation for irreverence, raunchy fun, and a broad music format continued into the 1980s. Mikel Hunter and his crew became known for oddball station promotions like the Chicken-Fly and the KOME Party Crashers. KOME enjoyed good ratings in both San Jose and San Francisco during this era.

According to an article in Metro, KOME's freeform ethic ended around 1982, when Infinity Broadcasting cut back the station's playlist and enlisted radio programming consultant Jeff Pollack. Mikel Hunter, who earlier had great success programming KMET in Los Angeles, left the station in protest. He spent the next few years working in radio in Las Vegas, Philadelphia and finally back in Northern California at KVYN in Napa Valley, California.

In 1983, PD Les Tracy hardened the format to a mostly heavy metal playlist. Tracy and the hard rock sound lasted less than a year. Due to poor ratings, KOME management released Tracy, and new PD Pat Evans reverted KOME to its previous approach.

The era between 1984 and 1994 were also ratings winners with personalities such as Blazy & Bob, Stephen Page, "Weird Old Uncle Frank" Bennett, Scott Lewis and the return of Dennis Erectus. KOME won the Rolling Stone Readers' Poll as "Station of the Year" in both 1988 and 1990, landing the station on the cover of the music magazine. Local, national and international live broadcasts and innovative promotions kept the station in the forefront of rock radio.

KOME's sound became a blend of alternative rock and new wave music in May 1994. Syndicated programming such as The Howard Stern Show and Loveline were featured on the station.

=== Final days ===
In 1997, Infinity Broadcasting, which had recently merged with CBS, purchased KITS "Live 105," San Francisco from Entercom. Both stations were run with identical formats for a short time. In May 1998 the company acquired American Radio Systems and was legally required to sell one of its existing stations. Infinity opted to sell the 98.5 frequency to Jacor, owners of longtime rival KSJO. Jacor transferred the classic rock station format heard on KUFX and its call sign to the newly acquired frequency. This meant the end of the KOME call letters on June 19, 1998.

CBS/Infinity transferred three members of KOME's air staff, mid day personality Ally Storm, night personality No Name, and Janine Siegel, plus the syndicated Howard Stern and Loveline shows to KITS as "The New Live 105". Afternoon personality Shark was bought out as the company felt KITS afternoon personality Big Rick Stuart had a long and established following. Shark moved on to Chicago at WZZN, WTMX, WCHI and others. The KOME call letters were retired from the Bay Area, resurfacing briefly on a small co-owned AM station outside the market.

KOME was inducted into the Rock Radio Hall of Fame in 2014.

=== Ratings history ===
The following tables compare KOME's Arbitron average share with those of KSJO and KSAN, over five two-month periods. The data is valid for listeners 12 years and older, from 6 a.m. until midnight, for seven days. In both tables, it appears that KOME began to overtake KSJO significantly in January and February 1979. In the San Francisco nine-county area, KOME actually overtook KSAN slightly in April and May 1979.

Santa Clara county only
	Apr/May 78	Jul/Aug 78	Oct/Nov 78	Jan/Feb 79	Apr/May 79
KOME	2.7	–	2.8	4.4	5.2
KSJO	2.6	–	2.4	3.2	4
KSAN	1.3	–	0.7	0.7	0.7

San Francisco nine-county, including Santa Clara county
	Apr/May 78	Jul/Aug 78	Oct/Nov 78	Jan/Feb 79	Apr/May 79
KOME	0.8	0.9	0.8	1.6	1.9
KSJO	0.8	1.8	1.0	1.1	1.2
KSAN	1.9	2.1	1.8	1.9	1.8

== Notable KOME personalities ==
- Carson Daly, 1990s (MTV, Last Call with Carson Daly)
- Peter B. Collins, 1970s. He switched to talk show host; covered the Watergate Scandal at the age of 19; was a host on San Francisco's KGO radio
- Mikel Hunter (a.k.a. Mikel Herrington, Lefty, Oil Can Harry "Captain Mikey") operations manager/Morning DJ, 1977–82 also KMET WYSP KLIV KVYN national voice of Sears (died 1997) Inducted into the Bay Area Radio Hall of Fame in 2008.
