= The Well-Tuned Piano =

Musical work by La Monte Young

A 1987 performance of The Well-Tuned Piano in conjunction with Zazeela's The Magenta Lights was released on DVD in 2000.

The Well-Tuned Piano is an ongoing improvisatory solo piano work begun in 1964 by La Monte Young. Young has never considered the composition or performance of this piece finished, and he has performed it differently several times since its debut in 1974. He has called it "in a sense, a life's work". The composition requires a piano tuned in just intonation. A 1987 performance of the piece was released on DVD in 2000.

A typical performance lasts five to six hours. and is performed within the context of Marian Zazeela's light art installation The Magenta Lights. The Guardian described it as "one of the great achievements of 20th-century music."

== Inspiration and influence ==
Young gives credit to Dennis Johnson, a former schoolmate and composer from UCLA, for inspiring The Well-Tuned Piano. Johnson wrote an extensive, improvisatory, solo piano piece titled November in 1959, a few years before Young began working on The Well-Tuned Piano. Although the piece is said to be as long as six hours, the tape recording made in 1962 cuts off suddenly after only an hour and a half.

Young has also been influential to many composers and musicians throughout his life. Dennis Johnson cites Young as an influence in his composition The Second Machine, which is based on four single pitches of Young's Four Dreams of China. Composer and critic Kyle Gann has said that The Well-Tuned Piano "may well be the most important American piano work since Charles Ives's Concord Sonata, in size, in influence, and in revolutionary innovation". Gann has also called the piece "the most important piano work of the late 20th century." In his book Four Musical Minimalists, Keith Potter states that The Well-Tuned Piano is significant "in the contexts of musical minimalism, of musics working at the interface between composition and improvisation, and of twentieth-century music for solo piano".

== Music ==
=== Tuning ===
Western piano tuning vs. Young's tuning for The Well-Tuned Piano
Piano key	12-TET (cents)	WTP (≈ cents)	Johnston's notation	Interval ratio	Frequency (≈ Hz)
E♭	000	000.00	E♭	1/1	297.989
E♮	100	176.65	F++	567/512	330.000
F	200	203.91	F+	9/8	335.238
F♯	300	239.61	G♭+	147/128	342.222
G	400	470.78	A♭+	21/16	391.111
G♯	500	443.52	A♭++	1323/1024	385.000
A	600	674.69	B♭+	189/128	440.000
B♭	700	701.96	B♭	3/2	446.984
B♮	800	737.65	C♭+	49/32	456.296
C	900	968.83	D♭	7/4	521.481
C♯	1000	941.56	D♭+	441/256	513.333
D	1100	1172.74	E♭+	63/32	586.667
E♭	1200	1200.00	E♭	2/1	595.979
Note that the 12-TET cents are all relative to Young's E♭ that is 74.69 cents flat, which puts A at exactly 440 Hz.

Magic chord (as played).

La Monte Young's piano tuning is an essential aspect of The Well-Tuned Piano. Young dates the piece as "1964–73–81–Present" to indicate the work's development through its tunings, wherein E was retuned in 1973, and C♯ and G♯ were retuned in 1981. Young had kept the tuning a secret until 1993, when he allowed Kyle Gann to publish the details.

Young has always performed The Well-Tuned Piano on an Imperial Bösendorfer piano, which is larger than a standard acoustic grand piano, spanning eight complete octaves, with nine notes extending the bass of the piano. Young describes the pitches of his tuning as being, "derived from various partials of the overtone series of an inferred low fundamental E-flat reference ten octaves below the lowest E-flat on the Bösendorfer Imperial".

Harmonic number	1	3	7	9	21	49	63	147	189	441	567	1323
Johnston's notation	Eb	Bb	D7b	F+	A7b+	C77b+	E7b+	G77b+	B7b+	D77b+	F7++	A77b++

As explained by Kyle Gann, Young's system uses 7-limit tuning, a just intonation system where every pitch class in the scale is constructed from a previously constructed pitch by taking only up to the seventh pitch from its overtone series or undertone series. Young cites a distaste for the fifth harmonic, so Young uses only overtone and undertone numbers 2, 3, 4, 6, and 7 in the construction of his scale. A consequence to this is that the ratio between the frequencies of any two pitches is a rational number whose numerator and denominator have prime factors consisting only of 2, 3, and 7. Factors of 2 correspond to octave shifts, so in tuning theory ratios are normalized to lie within the octave 1/1–2/1 by multiplying or dividing through by powers of 2.

All of the pitches in Young's scale can be placed in a two-dimensional grid, where pitches on the horizontal axis are related by a 3/2 ratio (a perfect fifth) and pitches on the vertical axis are related by a 7/4 ratio (a harmonic seventh). This collection of 12 pitches is then assigned to the keys of a standard piano keyboard in such a way that pitches with a 3/2 ratio tend to span 8 keys, which in standard piano tuning forms a perfect fifth. Each octave of the piano follows the same sequence of intervals. The following table shows the grid along with the assignment to piano keys:

B	F♯	C♯	G♯	
49/32	147/128	441/256	1323/1024	
C	G	D	A	E
7/4	21/16	63/32	189/128	567/512
E♭	B♭	F		
1/1	3/2	9/8		

The A key on the piano is tuned to A440, and the rest of the keys are tuned relative to this. This puts Young's Eb key 74.69 cents flatter than the Eb in equal temperament with the same A. It should be stressed that the key names are not meant to be tunings of the standard pitch names, and they are merely assignments of pitches to conveniently located piano keys. Some pitches, for example G♯ and G, are acoustically in reverse order.

The primary consonant intervals in Young's scale are:

Ratio	Cents	Name
3/2	701.96	Perfect fifth
4/3	498.05	Perfect fourth
7/4	968.83	Septimal minor seventh
7/6	266.87	Septimal minor third
9/7	435.08	Septimal major third
12/7	933.13	Septimal major sixth
14/9	764.92	Septimal minor sixth

In 12-TET, all intervals, when measured in cents, are a multiple of 100. According to Kyle Gann, when listening to The Well-Tuned Piano "you spend the first four hours becoming familiar with the cozy septimal minor third, the expansive septimal major third, and by the fifth hour you can hardly remember that intervals had ever been any other sizes." In 5-limit tuning, the major third is usually a 5/4 ratio, which at 386.31 cents is closer to a 12-TET 400 cent major third than the 9/7 septimal major third at 435.08 cents. As another point for comparison, in three-limit tuning the Pythagorean major third is an 81/64 ratio, which is 407.8 cents.

A tuning is a choice of pitches in a scale, which lets one judge the intonation of pitches, and a temperament is a tuning where compromises are made to an ideal tuning (like just intonation) to meet other requirements, such as being able to use any pitch as the tonal center for Western harmonic practice. Bach's The Well-Tempered Clavier took full advantage of the development of a temperament where all 24 major and minor scales were reasonably usable. In contrast, Young's The Well-Tuned Piano is organized around certain fixed non-transposable sets of pitches that function as scales, such as the Magic Chord. While just intonation eliminates rough beating between the harmonics of two pitches, the trade-off is the loss of general transposability to other tonal centers due to 2, 3, and 7 being coprime and pianos having a physical limit to the number of keys per octave.

=== Form ===
The Well-Tuned Piano, being improvisatory in nature, as well as ever-changing, has no specific form. The closest a listener can come to understanding the structure of Young's piece is by studying the liner notes from the 1981 Gramavision recording. Within the liner notes, Young breaks the performance into seven major sections and further deconstructs each of those sections into multiple subsections. The sections and subsections are not notated or described, but simply listed along with the duration of each section so a listener can easily follow along. The seven major sections are as follows:

1. Opening Chord (00:00:00–00:21:47)
2. Magic Chord (00:21:47–01:02:29)
3. Magic Opening Chord (01:02:29–1:23:54)
4. Magic Harmonic Rainforest Chord (1:23:54–03:05:31)
5. Romantic Chord (03:05:31–04:01:25)
6. Elysian Fields (04:01:25–04:59:41)
7. Ending (04:59:41–05:01:22)

The subsections are often called themes, and each is vastly and descriptively labeled. A few examples are "The Flying Carpet", which belongs in The Romantic Chord section, and "Sunshine in The Old Country", which is found in The Magic Opening Chord section. Each theme is made up of a specific, unique combination of pitches. However, the smaller themes found in one larger section will often have many pitches in common.

== Performance history ==
Young gave the world premiere of The Well-Tuned Piano in Rome in 1974, ten years after the creation of the piece. Previously, Young had presented it as a recorded work. In 1975, Young premiered it in New York with eleven live performances during the months of April and May. As of October 25, 1981, the date of the Gramavision recording of The Well-Tuned Piano, Young had performed the piece 55 times. The only other person to ever perform the piece besides Young is his disciple, composer and pianist Michael Harrison. Young taught Harrison the piece, which not only allowed him to perform it, but also to aid in tuning and preparing the piano for performances. In 1987, Young performed the piece again as part of a larger concert series that included many more of his works. This performance, on May 10, 1987, was videotaped and released on DVD in 2000 on Young's label, Just Dreams.

Each realization is a separately titled and independent composition, with over 60 realizations to date. The World première was presented in Rome in 1974. The American première was presented in New York City in 1975.

Chords from The Well-Tuned Piano are sometimes presented as sound art environments. These chords include The Opening Chord (1981), The Magic Chord (1984), The Magic Opening Chord (1984).

On 3 January 2016, the 25 October 1981 Gramavision recording of The Well-Tuned Piano was broadcast on BBC Radio 3 (followed by excerpts of other Young compositions and collaborations) between 1 am and 7 am (GMT).

=== Reviews ===
The playing waxes and wanes, with the slow parts ritualistically simple and repetitive and the fast parts whirling and flurring notes together into eerie, independently generated voices ... This sort of music is certainly not for everyone, and even for those who respond to it, there is sometimes the question of whether it should be concentrated on, meditated upon or simply lived through. Whatever one does, Mr. Young remains a fascinating if austere figure in our musical life.

— John Rockwell, The New York Times (1975),

The grand performing space was dimly lighted with magenta lights. There were no chairs. Listeners wore no shoes, reclining on plush white rugs….The work lasts about four hours, and listeners are encouraged to attend numerous performances. This listener's consciousness became a little restless after two hours of overtonal influence, but Mr. Young has clearly achieved something extraordinary, creating unexplored regions of sound.

— Edward Rothstein, New York Times (1981),

My personal experience with The Well-Tuned Piano was one of just such heightened concentration...the flow of momentum marshaled the vibrations of air in the room, slowly making the ear aware of sounds that weren't actually being played….I thought I heard foghorns, the roar of machinery, wood blocks, a didgeridoo, and most powerfully, the low, low vibration of the 18-cycles-per-minute E-flat that the ear supplied as the "missing fundamental" of the piano's overtones.

— Kyle Gann, The Village Voice (1987),

== Recordings ==
- 1981 Performance CDs La Monte Young, The Well-Tuned Piano: 81 X 25 (6:17:50–11:18:59 PM NYC), by La Monte Young, Gramavision 18-8701-2, 1987, five compact discs.
- 1987 Performance DVD La Monte Young, Marian Zazeela, The Well-Tuned Piano in The Magenta Lights (87 V 10 6:43:00 PM – 87 V 11 1:07:45 AM NYC), DVD, produced by La Monte Young and Marian Zazeela (New York: Just Dreams Inc., 2000).
