= Michael A. Wiener =

American businessman (1938–2009)

- Born: 1938; Brooklyn, New York
- Died: 2 August 2009 (aged 70–71)
- Occupation: Business executive
- Known for: Co-founder Infinity Broadcasting Corporation

Michael A. Wiener (c. 1938 – August 2, 2009) was an American business executive who was one of the two founders of the Infinity Broadcasting Corporation in 1972, ran the company as president and chairman, and became a philanthropist after selling the business and its 44 radio stations to Westinghouse Corporation in 1996 for $3.7 billion.

== Career ==
Born in Brooklyn, Wiener got his start in the radio business selling radio advertising. He started calling rock and roll "American music" as a ploy after prospective buyers were reluctant to place ads on stations that played the genre, which they "associated with the drug culture and the peace movement". He had been selling ad space for Metromedia when he joined together with Gerald Carrus to purchase San Francisco-area radio station KOME in 1972, a station that played free-form rock, with his investment covered with money raised from his wife and associates, along with $5,000 he had obtained after selling his father's stamp collection.

As the company grew, both Wiener and Carrus left their day jobs to work full-time at Infinity. Wiener was the company's president starting in 1972 and shifted to chairman in 1979, a position he retained until selling the company. In 1981, they hired Mel Karmazin as president of the radio division, by which time Infinity owned three stations. Over the next decade, Karmazin led Infinity on a buying spree and brought in shock jock Howard Stern, moving the business into successively larger radio markets.

Westinghouse Electric Corporation agreed to buy Infinity and its 44 radio stations for $3.7 billion in June 1996, under new regulations enacted under the Telecommunications Act of 1996 that allowed greater concentration of ownership in the radio business, paying 1.7 shares of Westinghouse stock for each of the 119 million shares of Infinity. Though Karmazin was the public face of the company, Wiener and Carrus owned the bulk of the shares, which were worth billions at the time of the Westinghouse deal, and had doubled by the time the company was later acquired by Viacom.

Interviewed for an obituary published in The New York Times, Howard Stern lauded Wiener as being "smart enough to hire Mel [Karmazin] and give him the freedom" to run the business as he saw fit, which included being someone "who would take a risk on me". He credited Wiener and Carrus with having "worked their way into larger markets" after starting in smaller markets, a genuine accomplishment given "the number of radio stations that go under".

== Philanthropy ==
A long-time philanthropist, Wiener had been a generous giver to the Cardiovascular Institute at Mount Sinai Hospital, New York. Wiener and his wife saw the need to provide integrated treatment for heart disease and became active supporters of the hospital's Dr. Valentín Fuster.

In 1997, his son Gabe died at age 26 after experiencing a cerebral aneurysm. In memory of their son, the Wieners dedicated the Gabe Wiener Music and Arts Library at Columbia University. They also endowed the Gabe M. Wiener Memorial Organ, a pipe organ with 4,345 pipes at the Central Synagogue in Manhattan, in memory of their son. Wiener stated in 2005 that his son "would really love the way this fills the synagogue with wonderful sounds". The Wieners contributed $2 million for the organ, after Columbia University rejected the offer based on concerns about architectural changes to the chapel in which it would have been placed and after rejecting a request by the New York Philharmonic as the Wieners wanted the organ used for music instruction. The Wieners contributed an additional $1 million to Central Synagogue in 2005 to endow a classical music series that featured choral and organ works.

== Personal ==
Wiener had an interest in photography, especially of landscapes, and had a 2005 display of his works at a Manhattan gallery, with proceeds going to charity.

Wiener died at age 71 on August 2, 2009, due to cancer. He is survived by his wife, a daughter and two grandchildren.
