= She's Coming Home =

1965 single by the Zombies

Single by the Zombies
- B-side: "I Must Move"
- Released: 27 March 1965 (US); 9 April 1965 (UK)
- Recorded: 2 March 1965
- Studio: Decca, London
- Genre: Pop; beat
- Length: 2:38
- Label: Parrot (US); Decca (UK)
- Songwriter: Rod Argent
- Producer: Ken Jones

The Zombies UK singles chronology
"Tell Her No" (1964)	"She's Coming Home" (1965)	"Whenever You're Ready" (1965)

The Zombies US singles chronology
"Tell Her No" (1964)	"She's Coming Home" (1965)	"I Want You Back Again" (1965)

"She's Coming Home" is a song written by keyboardist Rod Argent recorded by his band the Zombies. The song has early origins in Argent's life; he lifted segments from the 1946 song "Magnificat and Nunc dimittis" which he had heard in boy choir. Characterized by its unusual chord progression, the song was recorded on 2 March 1965 during a three-hour session held at Decca Studios along with several other tracks, all of whom were by their standard producer Ken Jones, who knew what Argent had looked for in the song and attempted to produce it in that style.

As the group was primarily focused on the American market at the time, Parrot Records quickly released the single – backed by bassist Chris White's "I Must Move" – on 27 March 1965. Although both the group's previous US singles had been top-ten hits on both Billboard Hot 100 and the Cashbox Top 100, "She's Coming Home" only become a mid-sized hit, not breaching the top-forty. The UK release by Decca Records on 9 April 1965, which failed to chart, can be considered the starting point of the group's declining commercial success. The single was relatively well received in both the United States and the United Kingdom.

== Background and composition ==
Throughout late 1964 and late 1965, the Zombies established themselves as respected artists, with two top-ten singles on both Billboard Hot 100 and the Cashbox Top 100, "She's Not There" and "Tell Her No". With both songs being composed by the group's keyboardist Rod Argent, it largely established him as a skilled songwriter. While they were successful in the United States during this time, the group's success in the UK diminished after "She's Not There"; that song was followed by "Leave Me Be" (1964) which failed to chart completely. As a result, the Zombies chose to focus primarily on the United States market at the time. With pressure from record companies, Argent and bassist Chris White started hurriedly composing. According to Argent, "She's Coming Home" was apparently based on European church music, stemming from his background in a boys' choir. He states that he lifted a chord progression from "Magnificat and Nunc dimittis" by Herbert Howells, a song that was composed in 1946. In Argent's ears, the song primarily stood out due to it being "bluesy", which was the only reason he even used the sequence. During the song's early stages, it used the working title "I Cry No More".

This is largely a reason why "She's Coming Home" contrasts from standard pop songs in their chord sequences. According to Claes Johansen, the song uses the opening chord during the second line of the last verse, which he considers making the song unique in that it doesn't use the standard form of pop songs using already established chords from verses. He compares it to that of White's writing, who had previously used it for some of his compositions. Lyrically, The song is about this protagonist's girlfriend declaring a wish to return home, much to the delight of him. Johansen states that the song is fairly similar to other Zombies songs from that era, in that the "male part of the relationship" appears to be fragile and "completely at mercy of her everchanging moods."

"She's Coming Home" was one of two Argent compositions recorded during the session, along with "I Want You Back Again". Two other songs were recording during that session, White's "I Must Move" and lead vocalist Colin Blunstone's "Just Out Of Reach." Held at Decca Studios on 2 March 1965, the recording was led and produced by Ken Jones, who was a long-time collaborator of the band. The song was completed in ten takes, after which the vocals were added. This continued the Zombies style of recording, which included recording several takes of the backing track, before choosing the best to overdub and add the vocal track over. Ken Jones, who thought he knew the sound Argent wanted, attempted to create a big band mood to the song. In doing so, Jones accidentally went overboard in his use of reverberation on both the lead- and backing vocals, which at the time was common practice, but became apparent in following decades following the popularity of digital audio.

== Release and commercial performance ==
As the band had focus on the American market during this time, "She's Coming Home" was rushed out to record shops before "Tell Her No" had dropped out of the American charts completely. Parrot Records released the single in the US on 27 March 1965, only a few weeks after it had been recorded. As "Tell Her No" had been a big hit, reaching number six on both primary American charts, "She's Coming Home" was anticipated to become a huge chart hit. Although both their previous records had been top-ten hits, "She's Coming Home" failed to even breach the top-forty. On Billboard Hot 100, the single first entered on 10 April 1965 at a position of 85, and two weeks later peaked at number 58. It spent 6 weeks on the chart. The single fared slightly better off on the Cashbox Top 100, where it reached number 48. "She's Coming Home" was released by Decca Records on 9 April 1965 in the UK on the same day as their debut studio album Begin Here, but failed to chart completely, a sign of their decreasing commercial success. Upon hearing that it had only become a small hit, Argent became disappointed.

Though issued at the same day as their UK debut album, "She's Coming Home" was never included on it. The song would not get a release on an album in the UK or US until it was issued on Time Of The Zombies in 1974, which compiled all their 1964–66 recordings. It didn't see any other album release in the US either, and wasn't issued again in the States till the age of compact discs in the 1980s, even though several other compilation albums with material by the group had been released throughout both the 1960s and 1970s, none of which included "She's Coming Home."

== Reception ==
Upon release, the single received generally good reviews. In a review for Disc magazine, critic Penny Valentine called the group "underrated" and stated that the single was "intricate and difficult to follow". She praised Argent for writing it, comparing the piano to that found in a church which in her opinion was marvellous. She ends by stating "scrumptious". Derek Johnson of New Musical Express writes that the single is "ear-catching light", considering that the single is in his opinion "mainly a plainative solo-voice styling". He further adds that the single has "effective chanting" which in his words "blends with the organ to create an unusual sound". Johnson closes by praising it for having a "walloping, forceful beat."

In Billboard, "She's Coming Home" was considered a "good teen ballad material with driving rhythm support", wrongfully predicting that it would become their third hit. In Cashbox the single was called a "tenner, easy-going item" while erroneously pronouncing "I Must Move" to be the A-side. In Music Business, the single was considered "yet another hit under their belt that can catch on right away". In Record World the single was chosen as a four-star single, writing "The intense and building musicianship of these guys flows over on this new cut about a love reunion. Argent considers the song rather tame, something that he attributed to Jones as he strived for a special "gimmick"

Ultimate Classic Rock critic Michael Gallucci rated it as the Zombies' 10th greatest song, attributing its lack of commercial success as a single to being "more Phil Spector than British Invasion."

== Charts ==
Chart performance for "She's Coming Home"
Chart (1965)	Peak position
Canada Top Singles (RPM)	21
US Billboard Hot 100	58
US Cash Box Top 100	48

== Sources ==
- Johansen, Claes (2001). The Zombies: Hung Up on a Dream: a Biography - 1962-1967. SAF Publishing. ISBN 978-094-671-93-41.
- Roberts, David (2006). British Hit Singles & Albums (19th ed.). Guinness World Records Limited. ISBN 1-904994-10-5.
- Hoffman, Frank (1983). The Cash Box Singles Charts, 1950-1981. The Scarecrow Press. ISBN 978-081-081-59-57.
- Russo, Greg (1999). Time of the Season: The Zombies Collector's Guide. Crossfire Publications. ISBN 978-096-481-57-59.
