= WPNR-FM =

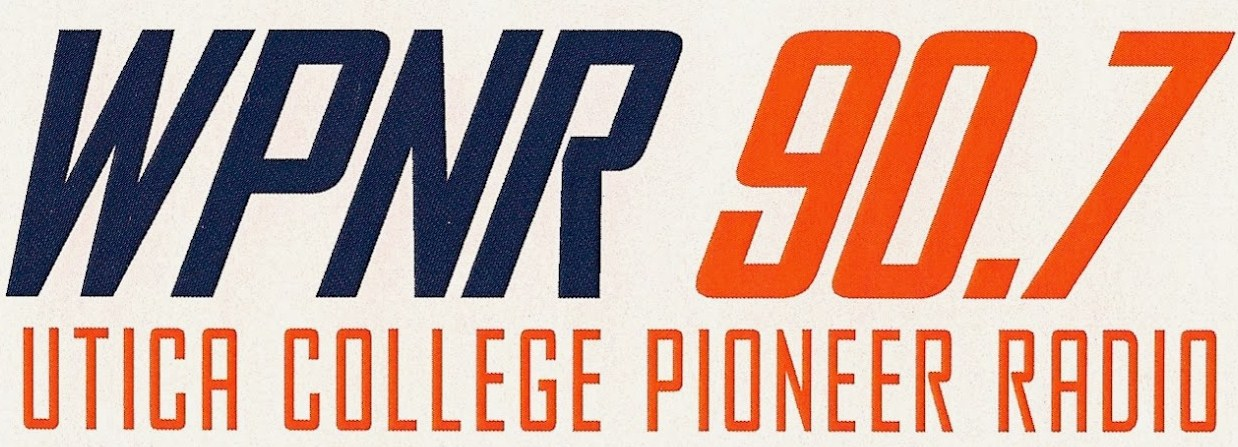
- Utica, New York; United States
- Frequency: 90.7 MHz

Programming
- Format: Variety

Ownership
- Owner: Utica University

History
- First air date: October 22, 1977
- Call sign meaning: "Pioneers", the college mascot

Technical information
- Licensing authority: FCC
- Facility ID: 64355
- Class: A
- ERP: 430 watts
- HAAT: −43 meters (−141 ft)
- Transmitter coordinates: 43°05′48″N 75°16′19″W

Links
- Public license information: Public file; LMS
- Webcast: Listen live
- Website: www.pioneerradio.org

WPNR-FM (90.7 FM, "Pioneer Radio") is the student-run radio station at Utica University in Utica, New York, United States. Programming is produced by Utica University students under the guidance of a faculty advisor and includes music and university athletic events. The studios and transmitter are at the Strebel Student Center on the campus.

== History ==
=== Radio at Utica University prior to WPNR-FM ===
The history of radio at what was then Utica College predates the present WPNR-FM by more than 20 years. In 1953, after three years of planning and construction, a radio workshop and studio were completed for students, with proposals to run lines to transmit the programs into the student union. Studios were in the student senate office, and one student, Leo Brannick, built much of the equipment. In December 1954, this evolved into a radio station known as "WRUC", with speakers inside and outside the student union. The station continued to operate on this model, on an off-and-on basis, for a decade; by 1964, its broadcasting led to an editorial in the campus newspaper, The Tangerine, which chided it for increasing the level of noise in the cafeteria and drowning out conversations. Noise level complaints led to the discontinuation of broadcasting in September 1965, with the radio workshop devoting its activities to program production for commercial stations. The noise reactions were also cited as backlash to rock and roll music. Under station manager Robert Green, the station had a "No Rock & Roll" sign in the station, which student disc jockeys frequently ignored; even after Green issued a December 1963 ultimatum in the wake of complaints that were received, students continued to play rock and roll.

Work began to reactivate WRUC in 1967; the station remained silent for several semesters while work was carried out to connect WRUC's output to the power lines in campus dormitories in a carrier current setup. The station resumed broadcasting in March 1968, but it went off the air again in April as its aging equipment began to fail and there was no money to hire electricians to fix it. The station was then renamed WRNS, after faculty advisor Ralph N. Schmidt, for the fall 1968 semester after it was discovered that the WRUC designation had already been assigned to Union College in Schenectady, after the fall semester, it left the air again, not returning until 1970.

=== Going FM ===
The idea of converting the campus station to an FM outlet, expressed since 1962, gained steam in the 1970s. As early as 1972, the college was preparing an application for a new 10-watt outlet on 90.7 MHz. The station changed its name to WEDJ in 1973—having learned that WRNS had been assigned to another station—and obtained a United Press International teletype. The WEDJ name in actuality stood for Ed and Dana Jacobson, in reference to the music director and station manager of the period.

The formal application by what was then the Utica College Branch of Syracuse University was filed on May 12, 1976, and a construction permit was granted by the Federal Communications Commission (FCC) on October 29. New FM equipment was purchased, in addition to existing studio equipment and items donated by Utica commercial station WIBX. A new station manager was appointed with the goal to tighten the station's format and production in preparation for the FM move.

WPNR-FM debuted on October 22, 1977. Four years after going on FM, the station upgraded to its present power level of 430 watts and began stereo broadcasts.

In the late 1980s, equipment breakdowns became so frequent that, in March 1989, disc jockeys opted not to broadcast for four days; broken turntables, microphones, and cart machines were cited by students, and the student director noted that the station was not keeping up with such obligations as station identification and the airing of public service announcements. As a result, the college lifted a budgetary freeze and allowed for new equipment to be ordered and installed.

A legal error by the FCC kept the station off the air for part of 1993. The station had as many as 112 DJs until a format and organizational change in 1997 reduced the number to create more professional and consistent programming.

It currently features a variety of music, live sports broadcasting, and public service announcements.
