= Butcher's Tale (Western Front 1914) =

Single by the Zombies

from the album Odessey and Oracle
- B-side: "This Will Be Our Year"
- Released: 10 June 1968
- Recorded: 20 July 1967
- Studio: EMI, London
- Genre: Baroque pop
- Length: 2:48
- Label: Date Records
- Songwriter: Chris White
- Producer: The Zombies

The Zombies singles chronology
"Time of the Season" (1968)	"Butcher's Tale (Western Front 1914)" (1968)	"Imagine the Swan" (1969)

"Butcher's Tale (Western Front 1914)" is a song written by Chris White of the Zombies, first released on the group's 1968 album Odessey and Oracle. It was also released as a single in the United States on 10 June 1968, backed by "This Will Be Our Year." "Butcher's Tale" was recorded in one take on 20 July 1967 at EMI Abbey Road Studio No. 3. The song has also been covered by They Might Be Giants, The Immediate, John Wilkes Booze and Chrysanthemums. The anti-war protest song is written from the perspective of a soldier fighting on the Western Front of World War I, mentioning the battles at Gommecourt, Thiepval, Mametz and Verdun in France.

== Lyrics and music ==
The lyrics are based on an incident from World War I, a subject in which White took an interest. The lyrics tell of a battle from the viewpoint of a soldier in the midst of the fight. Despite the title, the battle White had in mind when writing the lyrics occurred in 1916. The Bee Gees' 1967 song "New York Mining Disaster 1941" was apparently an inspiration for the serious tone of the song. In the album's CD liner notes, Alec Palao calls the song "a thinly-disguised comment on Vietnam."

Instrumentation on "Butcher's Tale (Western Front 1914)" is limited to Zombies keyboardist Rod Argent playing a pump organ in a manner described by Allmusic critic Matthew Greenwald as "odd-sounding." The song also includes sound effects reminiscent of musique concrète which were created by playing a Pierre Boulez album backwards and sped up.

Although White wrote the song for the Zombies' frontman Colin Blunstone to sing, White sang it himself as the group felt that his weaker voice better suited the lyrics. "Butcher's Tale (Western Front 1914)" is White's only lead vocal performance for The Zombies, with the exception of one verse of the Odessey and Oracle track "Brief Candles".

== Reception ==
Although "Butcher's Tale (Western Front 1914)" was the band's "most soberly uncommercial song," Date Records chose it to release as the second single from Odessey and Oracle in the United States on 10 June 1968, on the recommendation of Al Kooper and with the label believing that its implicit commentary on the Vietnam War would resonate with a young audience. The Zombies, however, were surprised that such an uncommercial song was chosen as a single, and it sold poorly.

Cash Box described the song as containing "some searching lyrics and a weird ear-catching instrumental setup to create interest for this wild outing." Allmusic critic Matthew Greenwald retrospectively called it one of The Zombies' "strangest and most experimental songs". Pierre Perrone of The Independent claimed that the song proved that "the band were both of their time and incredibly prescient." Arts writer Matt Kivel called the song a "creepy war ballad" and noted that it showed The Zombies experimenting with instrumentation in more imaginative ways than any contemporary band besides the Beatles. Arts writer Mike Boehm called it "one of the greatest anti-war songs in the rock canon" and "unsparing in its depiction of war's horrors". Music critic Antonio Mendez called it one of the "sublime" songs on Odessey and Oracle.

== Other versions ==
The Chrysanthemums covered "Butcher's Tale (Western Front 1914)" on their 1989 version of Odessey and Oracle. Allmusic critic Stewart Mason praised the "sneering hardcore punk setting" the group used for the song, stating that it "fits the horrific wartime imagery perfectly." A live cover by They Might Be Giants was featured on the 2000 various artists compilation Simply Mad, Mad, Mad, Mad About the Loser's Lounge. John Wilkes Booze covered the song in 2004 on Five Pillars of Soul. Jonas Prangerød noted that the John Wilkes Booze version is short and strange. The Immediate covered the song in 2006 on Stop and Remember.

== See also ==
- List of anti-war songs
