= R.I.P. (The Zombies album) =

Studio album by the Zombies
- Released: 25 October 2000
- Recorded: 25 November 1964 – May 1966 (Side B); March–December 1968 (Side A)
- Studio: Decca, Trident, Lansdowne and Morgan, London
- Genre: Baroque pop; power pop
- Length: 31:16
- Label: Imperial Records (Japan); Sweet Dandelion (UK); Varèse Sarabande (US)
- Producer: Rod Argent, Chris White

The Zombies chronology
New World (1991)	R.I.P. (2000)	As Far as I Can See... (2004)

Singles from R.I.P.
- 1. "Imagine The Swan / Conversation Off Floral Street" Released: 29 April 1969; 2. "If It Don't Work Out / Don't Cry For Me" Released: 18 June 1969 (US only)

Professional ratings
Review scores
Source	Rating
AllMusic	4/5 stars

R.I.P., also known as R.I.P. - The Lost Album, is a studio album by the English rock band the Zombies. It was originally scheduled to be released in 1969, but was cancelled. It was first released in Japan in October 2000 by Imperial Records.

In March 1968, Rod Argent, Chris White, and Hugh Grundy began working on material for a possible new band when they were approached by CBS to do another Zombies album. This three-man lineup recorded one composition, "Conversation Off Floral Street", before Chris White, wishing to retain only his role as a songwriter, was replaced on bass by Jim Rodford. Rick Birkett briefly joined the band on guitar, but this lineup only recorded a few sessions which did not make the album.

By late 1968, Birkett and Grundy had left the band, to be replaced by Russ Ballard and Bob Henrit respectively. This lineup would eventually come to be Argent; however, the remaining five tracks were intentionally recorded to sound like previous Zombies material, with Argent and Chris White handling all of the vocal work. Side B was composed of old out-takes and demos that were overdubbed and enhanced in sessions at Morgan Studios in London.

Two songs from the album, "Imagine the Swan" and "If It Don't Work Out" (a demo of a song that Dusty Springfield recorded and released in 1965), were put out as singles in 1969. The former only reached #109 on the American charts, while the latter failed to chart at all. Because of the singles' failure, the album was cancelled. Several of the tracks were first issued on Time of the Zombies in 1973, while the album as a whole was finally issued in 2000.

"She Loves the Way They Love Her" and "Smokey Day" were recycled by Argent and White for Colin Blunstone's 1971 solo album, One Year.

== Track listing ==
Side A
No.	Title	Writer(s)	Length
1.	"She Loves the Way They Love Her"	Rod Argent, Chris White	3:00
2.	"Imagine the Swan"	Argent, White	3:09
3.	"Smokey Day"	Argent, White	2:24
4.	"Girl, Help Me"	Argent, White	2:21
5.	"I Could Spend the Day"	Argent, White	2:32
6.	"Conversation Off Floral Street"	Argent, White	2:43

Side B
No.	Title	Writer(s)	Length
7.	"If It Don't Work Out"	Argent	2:29
8.	"I'll Call You Mine"	White	2:39
9.	"I'll Keep Trying"	Argent	2:27
10.	"I Know She Will"	White	2:35
11.	"Don't Cry for Me"	White	2:18
12.	"Walking In the Sun"	Argent	2:39
Total length:			31:16

Imperial Records bonus tracks
No.	Title	Length
13.	"I'm Goin' Home"
14.	"Nothing's Changed"
15.	"Remember You" (OST Version)
16.	"I'll Keep Trying" (Undubbed)
17.	"I Know She Will" (Undubbed)
18.	"Prison Song (Care of Cell 44)" (Backing Track)
19.	"A Rose for Emily" (Alternate Mix 1)
20.	"A Rose for Emily" (Alternate Mix 2)
21.	"Time of the Season" (Alternate Mix)

Varèse Sarabande CD bonus tracks
No.	Title	Writer(s)	Length
13.	"Imagine the Swan" (Mono Single Mix)	Argent, White	3:14
14.	"Smokey Day" (Mono Mix)	Argent, White	2:37
15.	"If It Don't Work Out" (Mono Single Mix)	Argent	2:30
16.	"Don't Cry For Me" (Mono Single Mix)	White	2:14

== Personnel ==
Side A

- Rod Argent – lead and backing vocals, keyboards, production
- Russ Ballard – guitar (1–5)
- Jim Rodford – bass (1–5)
- Bob Henrit – drums (1–5)
- Chris White – bass (6), backing vocals, production
- Hugh Grundy – drums (6)

Side B

- Colin Blunstone – lead vocals
- Rod Argent – keyboards, backing vocals
- Paul Atkinson – guitar
- Chris White – bass, backing vocals
- Hugh Grundy – drums
