= Magic chord =

Musical chord

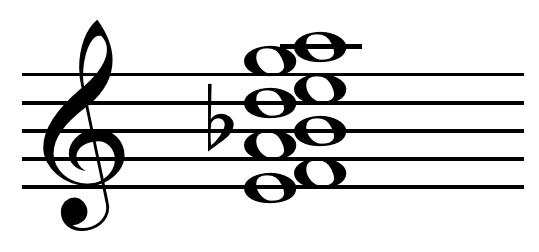
Magic chord. (approximate pitch classes sounded, A=440)

Magic chord (as played in The Well-Tuned Piano).

The Magic Chord is a chord and installation (1984) created by La Monte Young, consisting of the pitches E, F, A, B♭, D, E, G, and A, in ascending order and used in works including his The Well-Tuned Piano and Chronos Kristalla (1990). The latter was performed by the Kronos Quartet and features all notes of the magic chord as harmonics on open strings. The quartet has been described as, "offer[ing] perhaps the ultimate challenge in performing in a just environment".

Described as, "complex and throbbing", the chord does not contain its fundamental (see root chords), E♭, and is a subset of the Romantic Chord, G-Dorian in eight octaves, spelled G, A, B, C, D, E, F♯, G. "When the Magic Opening Chord is obtained by playing the Opening Chord at one end of a room while the Magic Chord is played at the other (as Young set it up for me), the feeling-changes of the stereo effect as you move back and forth[-]are dazzling." The opening chord consists of E♭, B♭, C, E♭, F, B♭ (ratios 4:6:7:8:9:12), adding C and E♭ to the magic chord when combined as the magic opening chord.

The Well-Tuned Piano is based on a pitch lattice of perfect fifths and harmonic sevenths, tuned as follows:

Note	Note played	(E♭)	E	F	G	A	B♭	(C)	D
Note	Note sounded relative to E♭ (Ben Johnston notation)	(E♭)	F7++	F+	A7b+	B7b+	Bb	(D7b)	E7b+
Note	Ratio	(1/1)	567/512	9/8	21/16	189/128	3/2	(7/4)	63/32
Note	Audio (from C)	(E♭)	E	F	G	A	B♭	(C)	D
Step	Ratio		567/512	64/63	7/6	9/8	64/63	7/6	9/8

For example, G (21/16) is the harmonic seventh of the perfect fifth (7/4 * 3/2 = 21/16):

	P5				
H7	49	147	441	1323	(3969)
H7	B	F♯	C♯	G♯	
H7	7	21	63	189	567
H7	C	G	D	A	E
H7	1	3	9	(27)	(81)
H7	E♭	B♭	F		
