= Infinity Broadcasting Corporation =

Former radio company

- Final logo, used from 1997 to 2005
- Type: Subsidiary
- Industry: Radio broadcasting Outdoor advertising
- Founded: 1972; 54 years ago
- Founder: Michael A. Wiener; Gerald Carrus
- Defunct: 2005; 21 years ago
- Fate: Renamed as CBS Radio
- Successors: CBS Radio; Audacy, Inc.
- Headquarters: New York City, New York, U.S.
- Area served: United States
- Key people: Mel Karmazin
- Parent: CBS Corporation (1997–2000); Viacom (2000–2005)
- Website: infinityradio.com

Infinity Broadcasting Corporation was a radio company that existed from 1972 until 2005. It was founded by Michael A. Wiener and Gerald Carrus. It became associated with popular radio personalities like Howard Stern, Opie and Anthony, Don Imus and Mike Francesa. Infinity merged with CBS Corporation in 1997 and later became part of Viacom in 2000, when CBS and Viacom merged, serving as the radio division of CBS. After the Viacom split in 2005, Infinity changed its name to CBS Radio; the company would later merge with Entercom, presently known as Audacy, Inc.

== History ==
=== Formation and pre-merger ===
Infinity was founded in 1972 by two former Metromedia executives Michael A. Wiener and Gerald Carrus, with the acquisition of KOME, an FM radio station that served the San Francisco Bay Area, and finally received its license by the Federal Communications Commission (FCC) a year later. In 1979, Infinity acquired WBCN in Boston.

In 1981, Mel Karmazin was brought in as new president. Karmazin oversaw the operation of New York's WNEW-AM (now WBBR) and WNEW-FM for Metromedia. Soon after, the company acquired fellow New York stations WNEW-FM, WKTU (now WINS-FM; the present-day WKTU is owned by iHeartMedia), WZRC, and WFAN the following years, followed by WYSP-FM in Philadelphia. In 1983, Infinity absorbed KXYZ in Houston and WJMK and WJJD in Chicago.

Infinity became a publicly traded company in 1986. Within a year, it had purchased six more stations: KROQ-FM in Los Angeles, WJFK-FM in Washington, D.C., WQYK-AM/FM in Tampa, and KVIL-AM/FM in Dallas.

Karmazin and three other company executives took the company private in 1988 and took it public again in 1992. In 1993, Infinity was expanded to 22 radio stations.

=== Merger with CBS and Viacom ===
As a result of the Telecommunications Act of 1996, which loosened ownership restrictions of broadcast stations, Infinity was able to quickly acquire more stations, gradually increasing its portfolio to 75 stations.

In 1996, it was announced that Westinghouse Electric Corporation (which owned CBS) would acquire Infinity Broadcasting. Karmazin had attempted to acquire CBS, but Michael Jordan, CEO of Westinghouse, refused to sell the firm to Karmazin but instead agreed to buy Infinity. The $4.9 billion deal was completed on December 31, 1996. As a result of the Westinghouse purchase, Infinity was merged into the CBS Radio Group, with Karmazin as president. Karmazin soon became chairman and CEO of CBS Radio, and took the control of the CBS television network.

Shortly after, Westinghouse sold its non-broadcasting assets and renamed itself as CBS Corporation. In 1998, CBS decided to spin off a portion of its radio and outdoor advertising holdings as Infinity Broadcasting Corporation, once again bringing the Infinity name back to the public. The stock offering was the largest in the media industry at the time and raised $2.87 billion.

The most significant move during 1999, however, was the deal struck with Viacom in September. Sumner Redstone, CEO of Viacom, shot down Karmazin's offer to buy Viacom. Karmazin then offered CBS to Redstone, who eventually made a $37 billion proposal to merge the two companies. Viacom completed the CBS Corp. purchase in May 2000, and it retained 80% ownership of Infinity. In that same year, Infinity acquired Outdoor Systems and renamed it Infinity Outdoor.

Under the new ownership by Viacom, Infinity acquired 18 radio stations from its competitor, Clear Channel Communications (now iHeartMedia), which needed to divest them as part of its own merger with AMFM Incorporated. The company also purchased Giraudy SA, an outdoor advertising company based in France. In 2002, Viacom acquired the remaining shares of Infinity that it did not already own, making it a wholly owned subsidiary. At that time, Infinity Outdoor was separated from Infinity Broadcasting and renamed Viacom Outdoor.

=== Departure of Mel Karmazin and Epilogue ===
Karmazin resigned in May 2004, due to many differences with Redstone. Karmazin later said he didn't get along with Redstone and found it difficult to be "No. 2" at a company, but particularly under Redstone. The two executives continued to snipe at each other through the media even a year after Karmazin left Viacom.

On December 14, 2005, Infinity Broadcasting reverted to CBS Radio, and joined with the CBS and UPN networks (the latter of which would later merge with former rival network The WB to form The CW), Paramount's television properties, Showtime Networks, Viacom Outdoor, Simon & Schuster, and Paramount Parks into a revived CBS Corporation. At that time, CBS Corp. spun off the "new" Viacom, which included MTV Networks, BET, and Paramount Pictures, among other assets. CBS Radio was sold to Entercom (now Audacy, Inc.) on November 17, 2017.

The Infinity Radio name and logo were used for an online-only variety hits station on CBS Radio's streaming platform, InfinityRadio.com and Radio.com, to maintain trademark rights. As of 2021 the infinityradio.com website resolves to audacy.com which still preserves the current trademark registration. The Infinity brand was later repurposed by Audacy for its Infinity Sports Network (after its transitional rights to the CBS Sports branding expired), and Infinity Networks—a syndication unit launched in 2025.
