= New World (The Zombies album) =

Studio album by the Zombies
- Released: April 1991
- Recorded: 1990
- Genres: Rock, pop
- Labels: RCA, Big Beat
- Producers: The Zombies, David Richards, Chris White

The Zombies UK chronology
Time of the Zombies (1973)	New World (1991)	R.I.P. (2000)

Professional ratings
Review scores
Source	Rating
AllMusic	2.5/5 stars

New World is the third studio album by the English rock band the Zombies, recorded in 1990. Several tracks were released in Europe in 1990 on an album called The Return of the Zombies. This album features numerous tracks from that release that were remixed or re-recorded, as well as new tracks, and was released in April 1991. According to the liner notes, it was recorded primarily to protect the name of the band in response to numerous groups of imposters that were then touring the US. Original members Rod Argent and Paul Atkinson were unavailable to join them for more than one track each.

The album was originally issued in the UK on RCA but never obtained a US release. RCA issued it on CD and later reissued on Ace's Big Beat label.

== Track listing ==
No.	Title	Writer(s)	Producer(s)	Length
1.	"New World (My America)"	Andy Nye, Chris White	The Zombies; David Richards; Remixed by Chris White
2.	"When Love Breaks Down"	Paddy McAloon	Chris White
3.	"I Can't Be Wrong"	Sebastian Santa Maria	The Zombies; Richards; Remixed by Chris White
4.	"Lula Lula"	White	The Zombies; Richards
5.	"Heaven's Gate"	Nye, White	The Zombies; Richards
6.	"Time of the Season"	Rod Argent	White
7.	"Monday Morning Dance"	Santa Maria	The Zombies; White
8.	"Blue"	Santa Maria	The Zombies; White
9.	"Nights on Fire"	Colin Blunstone, Santa Maria	The Zombies; White
10.	"Losing You"	Blunstone, Phil Dennys	The Zombies; White
11.	"Alone in Paradise"	Blunstone, Nye	The Zombies; White
12.	"Knowing You"	Blunstone	The Zombies; White
13.	"Love Conquers All"	Blunstone	White

== Personnel ==
The Zombies

- Colin Blunstone - lead vocals
- Chris White - bass, vocals
- Hugh Grundy - drums
- Sebastian Santa Maria - keyboards, guitar, vocals

Special Guests

- Paul Atkinson - guitar on "New World (My America)"
- Rod Argent - keyboards on "Time of the Season"

With:

- Tim Renwick - guitar
- John Woolloff - guitar
- Laurie Wisefield - guitar
- Duncan Browne - guitar
- Claude Nobs - harmonica
