= Imagine the Swan =

Single by the British band The Zombies

- German picture sleeve

Single by the Zombies

from the album R.I.P.
- B-side: "Conversation Off Floral Street"
- Released: May 1969
- Recorded: December 1968
- Studio: Abbey Road, London
- Genre: Baroque pop; rock
- Length: 3:09
- Label: Date
- Songwriters: Rod Argent, Chris White
- Producer: The Zombies

The Zombies singles chronology
"Time of the Season" (1968)	"Imagine the Swan" (1969)	"If It Don't Work Out" (1969)

"Imagine the Swan" is a song by the British rock band the Zombies, released as a single in May 1969. It was written by keyboard player Rod Argent and bass player Chris White. It was recorded following the unexpected success of "Time of the Season" and intended for a Zombies album following Odessey and Oracle that went unreleased at the time.

== Background ==
In 1968, Rod Argent and Chris White began working on material for a possible new band when they were approached by CBS to do another Zombies album. "Imagine the Swan" was one of many new songs recorded with a lineup of Argent, Hugh Grundy, Jim Rodford (bass) and Rick Birkett (guitar).

An album's worth of material, tentatively entitled R.I.P. was recorded, but remained unreleased at the time. It was first released in Japan in October 2000 by Imperial Records.

== Reception ==
"Imagine the Swan" was released in May 1969 as a single in the United States, backed with "Conversation Off Floral Street". It peaked at #9 on the Billboard Bubbling Under Hot 100 Chart and #77 on the Cashbox chart. In Canada, the single peaked at #59.

Record World called "Imagine the Swan" a "nifty pretty ditty" and "good contemporary rock." Billboard called it "smooth rock" with "strong material and performance." Cash Box called it "delightful" and said "Ballad in a melancholy tone is supported by a relatively simple instrumental track with well-worked time changes and a stunning organ close." Allmusic critic Matthew Greenwald noted that the lyrics were about a "lonely spinster", similar to the Odessey and Oracle song "Rose for Emily", and that the melody was based on Johan Sebastian Bach's The Well-Tempered Clavier.

Ultimate Classic Rock critic Michael Gallucci rated it as the Zombies' 7th greatest song, calling it "a sweet coda to a too-brief career."

== Charts ==
Chart performance for "Imagine the Swan"
Chart (1969)	Peak position
Canada Top Singles (RPM)	59
US Billboard Bubbling Under Hot 100	9
US Cash Box Top 100	77
