= Utica University =

Private university in Utica, New York, US

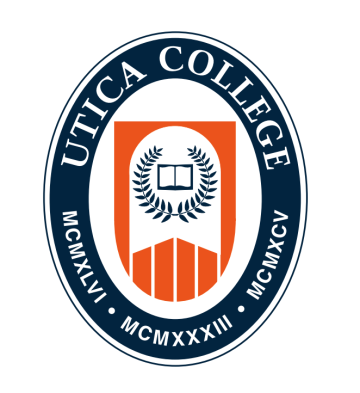
- Former names: Utica College of Syracuse University (1946–1995); Utica College (1995–2022)
- Motto: Never Stand Still
- Type: Private university
- Established: 1946; 80 years ago
- Endowment: $35.4 million (2024)
- President: Stephanie R. Nesbitt
- Provost: Ann Damiano
- Faculty: 169 FT/ 198 PT (2023)
- Students: 3,733 (2023)
- Undergraduates: 2,580 (2023)
- Postgraduates: 1,153 (2023)
- Location: Utica, New York, U.S. 43.095°N 75.272°W
- Campus: 128 acres (52 ha); Suburban
- Newspaper: The Tangerine
- Colors: Navy and orange
- Nickname: Pioneers
- Sporting affiliations: NCAA Division III – E8; CWPA; UCHC
- Mascot: Trax the Moose
- Website: utica.edu

Utica University is a private university in Utica, New York, United States.

Utica University offers bachelor's, master's, and doctoral degrees. The university consists of the School of Arts and Sciences, the School of Business and Justice Studies, and the School of Health Professions and Education.

As of 2022, there are over 32,000 Utica University alumni.

== History ==
The university's history dates back to the 1930s when Syracuse University began offering extension courses in Utica. Syracuse University established itself as a four-year institution in 1946. At the time, it was known as Utica College of Syracuse University. In 1995, it became a financially and legally independent institution, operating as Utica College without the Syracuse University affiliation. The university began offering its graduate degrees in 1999 and its undergraduate degrees in 2011.

For the 2016–2017 academic year, the university slashed its tuition rates by 42%.

With the approval of the New York State Board of Regents, Utica College officially changed its name to Utica University on February 17, 2022. The change followed an amendment to the board's definition of "university" passed the previous month, in which schools are no longer required to offer doctorates in at least three subjects to qualify for university status.

In 2023, the university board voted to cut 13 majors, with current students being allowed to continue in those majors. 15 majors were proposed to be cut, affecting 4.4% of the student body. The university declared "financial exigency" on July 1, 2025. 19 more programs and 30 to 50 full-time faculty were then proposed to be cut. Both sets of cuts, and the financial declaration, were vocally opposed by the local chapter of the American Association of University Professors.

=== Presidents ===
Name	Tenure	Notes
Winton Tolles	1946–1947	
Ralph F. Strebel	1947–1959	
James W. Harrison	1959–1962	
Kenneth Donohue	1963 –1970	
Ambrose J. deFlumere	1970–1976	
Harold J. Rankin	1976–1977	
Thomas D. Sheldon	1976–1982	
Lansing G. Baker	1982–1987	
Michael K. Simpson	1988–1997	
Thomas G. Brown	January 1998 – July 1998	Interim
Todd S. Hutton	1998–2016	
Laura M. Casamento	2016–2023	First female president
Todd Pfannestiel	2023 – 2025	
Stephanie R. Nesbitt	2026 – Present	

== Campus ==
Utica University's 128-acre (52 ha) campus is located in a largely residential section of west Utica, directly across Champlin Avenue from the former St. Luke's Hospital of Mohawk Valley Health System.

== Academics ==
Utica University offers 40 undergraduate majors, 29 undergraduate minors, and 21 graduate programs, including a Doctor of Physical Therapy. The university is accredited by the Middle States Commission on Higher Education. The American Chemical Society approved the chemistry program. Utica University also offers programs in teacher education, which lead to certification. The Department of Nursing offers baccalaureate, graduate, and advanced practice certification (Family Nurse Practitioner) options. The nursing programs are accredited by the Commission on Collegiate Nursing Education (CCNE).

The university has been designated a National Center of Academic Excellence in Cyber Defense Education (CAE-CD) by the National Security Agency and Department of Homeland Security, designated a National Center of Digital Forensics Academic Excellence (CDFAE) by the Department of Defense Cyber Crime Center and designated an Academic Center of Excellence (ACE) by the EC-Council.

== Athletics ==
Utica University offers 29 NCAA Division III intercollegiate sports. The teams, known as the Pioneers, compete in the Empire 8 athletic conference, along with Elmira College, Alfred University, Hartwick College, Nazareth College, Stevens Institute of Technology, and Saint John Fisher College. The men's and women's hockey teams compete in the United Collegiate Hockey Conference. The women's water polo team competes in the Collegiate Water Polo Association's Northern Division.

The student body's overall interest in athletics was significantly bolstered by the addition of football and ice hockey teams in 2001, and the addition of men's/women's wrestling and women's gymnastics beginning in 2023–24.

The football, field hockey, soccer, and lacrosse teams play in Charles A. Gaetano Stadium. The ice hockey teams compete at the Adirondack Bank Center. The Aud, as it is commonly called, was built in 1959 and provides seating for 3,850 fans. The men's hockey team led the nation in Division III home attendance in the 2006–07 and 2007–08 seasons. The basketball teams play on campus at the Harold Thomas Clark Jr. Athletic Center, which has a pool and racquetball courts.

In November 2007, the Utica University football team set an NCAA football record, the highest combined score (142 points) by two teams, in their 72–70 loss to Hartwick in four overtimes. In this game, Utica also set the NCAA record for most points scored (70) by the losing team.

Utica University has a women's basketball team, which won the Empire 8 championship in 2008. In 2009, they tied with Ithaca as the regular-season Empire 8 champions. In 2010, they regained their Empire 8 championship title.

== Student life ==
Utica University has a majority white student body and smaller populations of ethnic minorities, Black Non-Hispanic 228 (10.1%), White Non-Hispanic 1648 (72.8%), Hispanic/Latino 207 (9.1%), American Indian or Alaskan Native 9 (.4%), Asian 67 (3.0%), Pacific Islander 1 (.04%), International 64 (2.9%), Multiple Races 57 (2.5%), Unknown 23 (1.0%). In the Fall of 2020, 50% of that class was women. The Office of International Education actively updates and maintains the flags in Strebel to reflect the home countries of the current international students and the university's study abroad partners.

=== Media ===
WPNR, also known as Pioneer Radio, is Utica University's student-run 24/7 hour radio station featuring various music, live sports broadcasting and public service announcements. WPNR broadcasts games and posts highlight reels on its website, as well as various player and coach interviews. WPNR-FM and 90.7 MHz have been Utica University radio's licensed call letters and frequency since October 22, 1977.

The Tangerine is Utica University's student-run newspaper. It began the same year as the institution in 1946. Initially called the Utica College News, the newspaper's name changed to the Utica College Oracle. It finally settled on the current name, The Tangerine, a nod to Syracuse University's school color and athletic moniker, and their newspaper, The Daily Orange.

== Notable alumni ==
- Marilyn E. Jacox (BS 1951) a research chemist at the National Institute of Standards and Technology.
- Sherwood Boehlert (BA 1961), United States Congressman from January 1983 to January 2007.
- Frank Lentricchia (BA 1962), a literature professor at Duke University.
- Richard Evans (BS 1965), US Army brigadier general.
- John M. McHugh (BA 1970) was a United States Congressman from January 1993 to 2009; Secretary of the Army from 2009 to 2015.
- Andy Rubin (BS 1986), technology pioneer, co-founder and former CEO of Danger Inc. and Android Inc. He was the Senior Vice President of Mobile and Digital Content at Google.
- David P. Weber (BS 1995), Professor of Practice at Salisbury University
