= Whenever You're Ready (The Zombies song) =

1965 single by the Zombies

Single by the Zombies
- B-side: "I Love You"
- Released: 16 August 1965 (US); 3 September 1965 (UK)
- Recorded: 24 June 1965
- Studio: Decca, London
- Genre: R&B; pop; soul
- Length: 2:14
- Label: Parrot (US); Decca (UK)
- Songwriter: Rod Argent
- Producer: Ken Jones

The Zombies UK singles chronology
"She's Coming Home" (1965)	"Whenever You're Ready" (1965)	"Is This the Dream" (1965)

The Zombies US singles chronology
"I Want You Back Again" (1965)	"Whenever You're Ready" (1965)	"Just Out Of Reach" (1965)

"Whenever You're Ready" is a song written by English keyboardist Rod Argent, first recorded by his band the Zombies. Following an American tour in April 1965 supporting their then single "She's Coming Home", the band were disappointed in finding out it had been a chart failure. After the follow-up "I Want You Back Again" was an even less commercial song, pressure from the group's management came forward in order for them to write a commercial song in the style of their earlier singles, which had been hits.

Heavily inspired by vocal group the Impressions, the song was recorded on 24 June 1965 at Decca Studios in London. It was initially released in the United States through Parrot Records on 16 August 1965, and a few weeks later in the UK through Decca Records on 3 September. Though a heavily commercial song, the single flopped, becoming their first to reach the Billboard Bubbling Under Hot 100 and failing to chart in the UK. Backed by the much more covered Chris White composition "I Love You", "Whenever You're Ready" has received critical acclaim both upon release and retrospectively

== Background ==
Towards the end of April 1965, the Zombies embarked on their second national US tour. Because of the constant traveling, a lot of stress was put on the group, particularly guitarist Paul Atkinson, who lost a lot of weight during the tour because of it. The reason behind this hectic schedule was that the band performed in front of thousands during performances, in Beatlemania-like conditions. This however did not mirror their chart success, as during the tour, their single "She's Coming Home" had only reached number 58 on the Billboard Hot 100. After the follow-up "I Want You Back Again" fared even worse in the US (number 95 in Billboard and 92 in Cashbox Top 100), their management pressured them to compose more commercially sounding songs, as "I Want You Back Again" was relatively uncommercial. This led keyboardist Rod Argent to write "Whenever You're Ready", which had a similar riff to that of their debut single "She's Not There" which had been a hit.

According to Argent, he was heavily inspired by the American vocal group the Impressions, who the Zombies also covered several tracks by on stage. One of these songs was "People Get Ready", a song that Argent thought was good and in an attempt to compose something in that style, he came up with "Whenever You're Ready. The song was initially demoed in early June of 1965, following their US tour. A few weeks after this, on 24 June, the group once again returned to Decca Studios number two in order to record an entire batch of songs, including "Whenever You're Ready." The single took 9 takes to record, and used the Zombies regular method of recording several takes before dubbing the best one. The session was produced by their standard producer Ken Jones, who lead vocalist Colin Blunstone criticized, as the group wasn't allowed into the studio during mixing.

== Release and reception ==
As the Zombies were primarily focused on the American market during this time, the single got released in the United States first, through Parrot Records. In the US, the single was only an extremely minor hit, not even reaching the Billboard Hot 100. It did however, reach number ten on the Bubbling Under Hot 100 chart, their first of two singles to do so. Unlike their earlier singles, that generally fared better in Cashbox's list, "Whenever You're Ready was an even minor hit, only reaching number 114 on that chart. The single was released in the UK a couple of weeks later through Decca Records on 3 September 1965. Like all albums issued in the territory following "Tell Her No", it failed to chart. The B-side was bassist Chris White's "I Love You", which later would become a top-20 hit in a cover by American band People! in 1968.

This had a big impact on the band, who all expected the single to become a hit. According to Blunstone, the lack of success with the single was largely due to their vocal performance, as although he liked the song, he thought the harmonies sounded better live. Argent, expressed frustration at the lack of success, stating that he really believed "Whenever You're Ready" would become a hit, though acknowledging that the record-buyers had the primary power in this. He later criticized Jones for the mix on the single, calling it "substansial" which he felt largely hindered the chart success it could have received otherwise. Atkinson claims that he and Blunstone "lost a lot of heart" when the single flopped, as he claimed that the Zombies thought that it was the one which would make them chart-toppers once more. It also proved to the band that writing number-one singles became increasingly harder, which put a lot of stress on the group.

In the United States, the single achieved good reviews. In a review for Cashbox magazine the single was introduced as "The Zombies should have no difficulty in zooming up the hitsville path lickety-split with this ultra-commercial Parrot offering called “Whenever You’re Ready." They called the track a "medium-paced" romantic song, positively noting the lyrics about the protagonist wanting his ex-girlfriend to return. In the UK, the single also received primarily positive reviews. In a review for New Musical Express, critic Derek Johnson stated "piano and cymbals support the soloist at the outset, then it breaks into a unison-vocal mid-shaker." He writes that he enjoyed their rhythm and blues-influenced music while simultaneously praising Colin Blunstone for his vocal output, which Johnson believes works because he doesn't resort to shouting. He ends the review by positively noting the keyboard solo which appears during the instrumental break.

Retrospectively, Matthew Greenwald calls "Whenever You're Ready" one of the group's "most accessible efforts". He states that the "lush" melody is reminiscent of both Burt Bacharach and Brian Wilson, calling it a "stylish slice of Beach Boys-inspired pop". He closes by stating that is one of the best earlier compositions by the group. Eric Harvey from Pitchfork calls the track "Motown-flavoured", while Michael Gallucci of Ultimate Classic Rock listed it at number eight on his list of Top-10 Songs By The Zombies, citing it to be "loaded with the band's classic sounds, including a jazzy electric piano solo and a catchy chorus." He ends by stating that he wished it fared better on the charts.

== Charts ==
Chart performance for "Whenever You're Ready"
Chart (1965)	Peak position
US Billboard Bubbling Under Hot 100	110
US Cash Box Bubbling Under Top 100	114

== Sources ==
- Johansen, Claes (2001). The Zombies: Hung Up on a Dream: a Biography - 1962-1967. SAF Publishing. ISBN 978-094-671-93-41.
- Roberts, David (2006). British Hit Singles & Albums (19th ed.). Guinness World Records Limited. ISBN 1-904994-10-5.
- Hoffman, Frank (1983). The Cash Box Singles Charts, 1950-1981. The Scarecrow Press. ISBN 978-081-081-59-57.
- Russo, Greg (1999). Time of the Season: The Zombies Collector's Guide. Crossfire Publications. ISBN 978-096-481-57-59.
