= I Want You Back Again =

1965 single by the Zombies

Single by the Zombies
- B-side: "I Remember When I Loved Her"
- Released: 12 June 1965
- Recorded: 2 March 1965
- Studio: Decca, London
- Genre: Jazz rock; R&B
- Length: 2:14
- Label: Parrot
- Songwriter: Rod Argent
- Producer: Ken Jones

The Zombies US singles chronology
"She's Coming Home" (1965)	"I Want You Back Again" (1965)	"Whenever You're Ready" (1965)

"I Want You Back Again" is a song written by keyboardist Rod Argent and originally recorded by his band the Zombies. Initially laid down during a session at Decca Studios on 25 November 1964, the group was unsatisfied with the result and the song was not re-recorded until 2 March 1965, together with several other songs. The song largely departs from the soft rock sound of their earlier singles and ventures into jazz rock. Characterized by an unusual rhythmic melody, the song was liked by lead vocalist Colin Blunstone, who didn't like the genre.

Due to contract obligations, along with a primary fixation on the American market, "I Want You Back Again" was released as a single in the United States through Parrot Records on 12 June 1965. Backed by "I Remember When I Loved Her", the song was a commercial failure, reaching only the lower parts of both Billboard Hot 100 and Cashbox Top 100. Due to this, the single never got a UK release, where it remained unreleased until 1984, when it finally was released on a compilation album with a different title. It was generally well received upon release and retrospectively.

== Background ==
By mid-1965, the Zombies had established themselves as respected artists, with their singles "She's Not There" and "Tell Her No" (both 1964) both reaching the top-ten on Billboard Hot 100 and Cashbox Top 100. This led the group's management to focus on the American market, as their singles released in the UK proved to be commercial failures, the follow-up to these singles, "She's Coming Home" was a although a critical success, it failed to reach the top-twenty in the US. This once again led their record company, Decca Records, along with their American counterpart Parrot Records to put pressure on the group's two primary songwriters, keyboardist Rod Argent and bassist Chris White in order to get them to achieve a hit. This led Argent to compose "I Want You Back Again", which at the time had the working title "Somebody Help Me".

The initial version of the song was laid down at Decca Studios number 2 on 25 November 1964, together with their standard producer Ken Jones. Because seven tracks where recorded during that session, the Zombies were tired upon the time "I Want You Back Again was recorded, which led to them getting unsatisfied with the end result. The group would only attempt the song again on 2 March 1965, once again at Decca together with Jones. During that session, the band laid down several songs, including "She's Coming Home." "I Want You Back Again" was recorded in 11 takes during that session, after which, the group satisfied, shelved the recording in Decca's vault. Author Claes Johansen writes that the song was rhythm and blues-inspired, which in his eyes worked well when it was written by the group. Both Matthew Greenwald from AllMusic and Michael Galluci of Ultimate Classic Rock identify the single as "jazzy", with Greenwald adding that it has characteristics of waltz too.

== Release and reception ==
As the group's management primarily focused on the American market at the time, "I Want You Back Again" was rush-released as a follow-up to "She's Coming Home". Al Gallico, who published the Zombies songs for Parrot Records, chose the single to be released. The single, backed by another Argent composition "I Remember When I Loved Her" was released on 12 June 1965 through Parrot. Just like "She's Coming Home", the single failed to reach the top-ten on neither Billboard Hot 100 nor Cashbox Top 100. The song entered Billboard on 26 June 1965 at a position of 98, and peaked at number 95 on 10 July before finally dropping out. The song was a marginally bigger hit in Cashbox, where it reached number 92. Though the single was also released in Canada and Australia, it failed to chart in both territories. Because of the single's lack of commercial success it was never released on single in the UK, although "I Remember When I Loved Her" had appeared on the group's UK debut album Begin Here (1965)

Upon release, the single garnered several positive reviews. In Billboard magazine, the song's "jazz waltz feel backs up a strong piece of material", while comparing it to their previous single "She's Coming Home". In Cashbox magazine, the single was chosen as a pick of the week, writing that the song predictably would become a hit. They call the song a "powerful presentation of blues in a throbbing drum-guitar background.", which Cashbox just like Billboard links to their previous single, which in their words had "a catchy blend of rock and blues waltz on the plug side." Lead vocalist Blunstone was a fan of the song, though he never thought waltz was a good music "because people can't dance to them."

In a retrospective review by Matthew Greenwald for AllMusic, he writes that the song flopped due to the Zombies being "simply a bit too adventurous at times for their own good.". He states the American record buyers didn't expect this "ambitious jazz-tinged waltz". Though, he positively ends by stating that the song "has aged very, very well and is one of their early creative peaks." Brett Callwood of The Village Voice called the song a "fascinating listen", Similarly, Michael Gallucci of Ultimate Classic Rock ranked the song at number nine on his list of Top 10 Songs By The Zombies, citing "incorporating rhythmically tricky melodies not usually heard on pop radio" as a main source. Though the B-side was initially included on the group's UK debut album Begin Here, "I Want You Back Again" never got a studio album release in the UK. It was first issued in the US three years after the initial release, on a compilation album titled Early Days, which compiled several early recordings by the band. In the UK however, it remained unissued for decades, first being issued on an eponymous compilation album in 1984, where it was titled "I Want Her Back".

== Charts ==
Chart performance for "I Want You Back Again"
Chart (1965)	Peak position
US Billboard Hot 100	95
US Cash Box Top 100	92

== Sources ==
- Johansen, Claes (2001). The Zombies: Hung Up on a Dream: a Biography - 1962-1967. SAF Publishing. ISBN 978-094-671-93-41.
- Roberts, David (2006). British Hit Singles & Albums (19th ed.). Guinness World Records Limited. ISBN 1-904994-10-5.
- Hoffman, Frank (1983). The Cash Box Singles Charts, 1950-1981. The Scarecrow Press. ISBN 978-081-081-59-57.
- Russo, Greg (1999). Time of the Season: The Zombies Collector's Guide. Crossfire Publications. ISBN 978-096-481-57-59.
