= Just Out of Reach (song) =

1965 single by the Zombies

Single by the Zombies
- A-side: "Remember You (UK)"
- B-side: "Remember You (US)"
- Released: 25 October 1965 (US); 21 January 1966 (UK)
- Recorded: 2 March 1965
- Studio: Decca, London
- Genre: Rock
- Length: 2:07
- Label: Parrot (US); Decca (UK)
- Songwriter: Colin Blunstone
- Producer: Ken Jones

The Zombies UK singles chronology
| "Is This the Dream" (1965) | "Remember You" / "Just Out of Reach" (1966) | "Indication" (1966) |

The Zombies US singles chronology
| "Whenever You're Ready" (1965) | "Just Out of Reach" (1965) | "Is This the Dream" (1966) |

"Just Out of Reach" is a song written by singer Colin Blunstone, first recorded by his band the Zombies in 1965. In 1965, it was clear that the Zombies were going to be featured in Otto Preminger's 1966 movie Bunny Lake Is Missing. Therefore, the band had struck a deal with Preminger; he wanted three new songs by the group, recorded in the span of only ten days. During this time, the band's primary songwriters, keyboardist Rod Argent and bassist Chris White suffered somewhat from writer's block. Although White had already managed to come up with two songs, "Remember You" and "Nothing's Changed", the third song was still missing, much to the group's disappointment. Therefore, Blunstone was tasked with the final song.

According to Blunstone, "Just Out of Reach" was the second composition he had written. He stated that he had "been intrigued and impressed" on Argent and White's abilities to write material, and wanted to get a stab in on it himself. Upon receiving the question on how the song had been composed, Blunstone always replied by stating that "the phonecall I'd receive made me write it". Author Claes Johansen states that in Blunstone's desperation to write a song, he took inspiration from the Nina Simone song "Wild Is the Wind", which he had heard on her live album Live at the Town Hall. Blunstone used "Just Out Of Reach" as the title for the song, as in his writing, he just couldn't think of a title to use for it.

Johansen further adds that "Just Out of Reach" had a "punchy approach" which formed a good contrast to the writing of Argent and White, but that Blunstone also took inspiration by the pair in the form of odd key changes found in the song. There's a D major to F major chord change present during the song's chorus, which in Johansen's words was "akin to a major-minor chord change. "Just Out of Reach" was recorded on 2 March 1965 at Decca Studios in London, together with Ken Jones, their standard producer. The song was produced in 18 takes, with Johansen praising the production, which in his opinion made the rhythm guitar "delicious crisp", adding that the Vox Continental organ is "sheer bliss".

In keeping with the theme of Bunny Lake Is Missing, the group once again returned to Decca Studios, this time with Preminger in order to re-record the track. Though Alec Palao states that this session was held on 2 March 1965, Johansen insists that it was laid down on 31 March 1965 together with a new re-recording of "Remember You". With lyrics by Harold Bunbrim, the song was now recorded as "Come on Time". This took 18 takes to complete, with the organ solo coming from take 10. The lyrics in this version ties in with Preminger's vision of coming on time during cinema screenings. Argent, who sang a part in this version, was insisted by Preminger to sing "clark" instead of clock for the US audience to understand. Preminger was not easy to work with, as according to Blunstone he was "atrocious" in the studio. This rendition was solely intended to be a trailer for the movie, and was never fully released for several years.

As the Zombies still were primarily focused on the American market at this time, "Just Out of Reach" was unvaulted by Parrot Records, who released it as a single on 25 October 1965, backed by "Remember You". In doing so, it was the first single A-side released in the US not written by Rod Argent. The single was just a minor hit, similarly to their other singles at the time, as it only reached number 13 on US Billboard Bubbling Under Hot 100, though fared better on US Cash Box Bubbling Under Top 100, where it reached number 10. Therefore, in the UK, the order was switched, with "Remember You" becoming the A-side, and "Just Out of Reach" on the B-side. As the recording was nearly a year old at the time of release on 21 January 1966, it was met with commercial indifference.

In Billboard, the song was described as "a "hard driving rocker" which had "chart hit potential." In Cashbox the reviewer stated that the group "should get back into their winning ways with this midtempo rocker". It was rated a "B+" single. According to Derek Johnson from New Musical Express, "Just Out of Reach" reminded him of the early Zombies, noting the "strident twangs, driving beat" along with the vocals, which he called soulful. He ends by noting the bizarre coupling with "Remember You". According to Rod Argent, "Just Out of Reach" was a prime example of what he thought "mid-60's singles should sound like". He praises the song for working in this manner, and states that he really enjoys the record. The Zombies still perform "Just Out of Reach" on stage to this day. Johansen praised Atkinson's playing on the song, writing that it had "good taste" and a "robust feel."

== Charts ==
Chart performance for "Just Out of Reach"
| Chart (1965) | Peak position |
|---|---|
| US Billboard Bubbling Under Hot 100 | 13 |
| US Cash Box Looking Ahead Top 50 | 10 |

== Sources ==
- Johansen, Claes (2001). The Zombies: Hung Up on a Dream: a Biography - 1962-1967. SAF Publishing. ISBN 978-094-671-93-41.
- Roberts, David (2006). British Hit Singles & Albums (19th ed.). Guinness World Records Limited. ISBN 1-904994-10-5.
- Hoffman, Frank (1983). The Cash Box Singles Charts, 1950-1981. The Scarecrow Press. ISBN 978-081-081-59-57.
- Russo, Greg (1999). Time of the Season: The Zombies Collector's Guide. Crossfire Publications. ISBN 978-096-481-57-59.
